= 2005 St. George Illawarra Dragons season =

Rugby club season

- NRL rank: 2nd
- Play-off result: Preliminary Finals
- 2005 record: Wins: 16; draws: 0; losses: 8
- Points scored: For: 655; against: 510

Team information
- Coach: Nathan Brown
- Captain: Trent Barrett
- Stadium: Jubilee Oval, Wollongong Showground
- Avg. attendance: 15,151
- High attendance: 19,608 (vs. Sharks, finals week 1)

Top scorers
- Tries: Colin Best (20)
- Goals: Michael Ennis (44)
- Points: Michael Ennis (108)
← 2004	2006 →

The 2005 St. George Illawarra Dragons season was the seventh in the joint venture club's history. The Dragons competed in the NRL's 2005 premiership season. The team finished second in the regular season, making finals but getting knocked out in the preliminary finals against the Wests Tigers, losing 20–12.

== Squad gains and losses ==
▲ or ▼	Player	2004 Club	2005 Club
▲	Colin Best	Hull F.C. (Super League)	St. George Illawarra Dragons
▲	Michael Ennis	Newcastle Knights	St. George Illawarra Dragons
▲	Willie Manu	South Sydney Rabbitohs	St. George Illawarra Dragons
▲	Shane Marteene	South Sydney Rabbitohs	St. George Illawarra Dragons
▲	Chris Sheppard	North Queensland Cowboys	St. George Illawarra Dragons
▲	Albert Torrens	Manly Warringah Sea Eagles	St. George Illawarra Dragons
▼	Nathan Blacklock	St. George Illawarra Dragons	Hull F.C. (Super League)
▼	John Carlaw	St. George Illawarra Dragons	Retirement
▼	Brett Firman	St. George Illawarra Dragons	Sydney Roosters
▼	Andrew Frew	St. George Illawarra Dragons	Retirement
▼	David Howell	St. George Illawarra Dragons	Canberra Raiders
▼	Tony Jensen	St. George Illawarra Dragons	Retirement
▼	Brent Kite	St. George Illawarra Dragons	Manly Warringah Sea Eagles
▼	Nathan Long	St. George Illawarra Dragons	Retirement
▼	Henry Perenara	St. George Illawarra Dragons	Parramatta Eels
▼	Mark Riddell	St. George Illawarra Dragons	Parramatta Eels
▼	Lincoln Withers	St. George Illawarra Dragons	Canberra Raiders

== Ladder ==
2005 NRL season
Pos	Team	Pld	W	D	L	B	PF	PA	PD	Pts
1	Parramatta Eels	24	16	0	8	2	704	456	+248	36
2	St George Illawarra Dragons	24	16	0	8	2	655	510	+145	36
3	Brisbane Broncos	24	15	0	9	2	597	484	+113	34
4	Wests Tigers (P)	24	14	0	10	2	676	575	+101	32
5	North Queensland Cowboys	24	14	0	10	2	639	563	+76	32
6	Melbourne Storm	24	13	0	11	2	640	462	+178	30
7	Cronulla-Sutherland Sharks	24	12	0	12	2	550	564	-14	28
8	Manly-Warringah Sea Eagles	24	12	0	12	2	554	632	-78	28
9	Sydney Roosters	24	11	0	13	2	488	487	+1	26
10	Penrith Panthers	24	11	0	13	2	554	554	0	26
11	New Zealand Warriors	24	10	0	14	2	515	528	-13	24
12	Canterbury-Bankstown Bulldogs	24	9	1	14	2	472	670	-198	23
13	South Sydney Rabbitohs	24	9	1	14	2	482	700	-218	23
14	Canberra Raiders	24	9	0	15	2	465	606	-141	22
15	Newcastle Knights	24	8	0	16	2	467	667	-200	20

=== Ladder Progression ===
Round	1	2	3	4	5	6	7	8	9	10	11	12	13	14	15	16	17	18	19	20	21	22	23	24	25	26
Ladder Position	14th	14th	15th	15th	14th	14th	13th	13th	12th	9th	9th	10th	9th	7th	6th	7th	7th	8th	6th	5th	3rd	3rd	3rd	3rd	2nd	2nd

== Season results ==
Round	Home	Score	Away	Match Information
Round	Home	Score	Away	Date	Venue	Referee	Attendance	Source
1	Canterbury-Bankstown Bulldogs	46 – 28	St. George Illawarra Dragons	11 March	Stadium Australia	Paul Simpkins	33,105
2	St. George Illawarra Dragons	12 – 46	Melbourne Storm	19 March	Wollongong Showground	Tony Archer, Gavin Badger	9,032
3	Penrith Panthers	18 – 8	St. George Illawarra Dragons	26 March	Penrith Stadium	Russell Smith	17,187
4	Canberra Raiders	42 – 22	St. George Illawarra Dragons	2 April	Canberra Stadium	Tim Mander	15,614
5	St. George Illawarra Dragons	32 – 6	Manly Warringah Sea Eagles	9 April	Wollongong Showground	Sean Hampstead	16,117
6	St. George Illawarra Dragons	24 – 34	Brisbane Broncos	17 April	Wollongong Showground	Steve Clark	17,287
7 (ANZAC Day)	Sydney Roosters	24 – 26	St. George Illawarra Dragons	25 April	Sydney Football Stadium	Sean Hampstead	32,370
8	Wests Tigers	32 – 40	St. George Illawarra Dragons	1 May	Stadium Australia	Jason Robinson	17,567
9	St. George Illawarra Dragons	42 – 10	South Sydney Rabbitohs	7 May	Wollongong Showground	Sean Hampstead	11,624
10	St. George Illawarra Dragons	34 – 12	Penrith Panthers	13 May	Wollongong Showground	Paul Simpkins	12,932
11	Newcastle Knights	16 – 18	St. George Illawarra Dragons	21 May	Newcastle International Sports Centre	Shayne Hayne	19,018
12	Melbourne Storm	24 – 16	St. George Illawarra Dragons	29 May	Olympic Park Stadium	Russell Smith	7,590
13	St. George Illawarra Dragons	32 – 18	New Zealand Warriors	4 June	Wollongong Showground	Steve Clark	14,479
14	St. George Illawarra Dragons	34 – 4	North Queensland Cowboys	12 June	Jubilee Oval	Tim Mander	15,260
15	South Sydney Rabbitohs	10 – 28	St. George Illawarra Dragons	19 June	Sydney Cricket Ground	Paul Simpkins	18,334
16	St. George Illawarra Dragons	24 – 32	Wests Tigers	26 June	Jubilee Oval	Shayne Hayne	10,612
17		BYE
18	Parramatta Eels	40 – 14	St. George Illawarra Dragons	8 July	Parramatta Stadium	Tim Mander	20,199
19	Manly Warringah Sea Eagles	10 – 36	St. George Illawarra Dragons	17 July	Brookvale Oval	Steve Clark	17,218
20	St. George Illawarra Dragons	20 – 10	Cronulla-Sutherland Sharks	24 July	Jubilee Oval	Tim Mander	17,113
21	St. George Illawarra Dragons	44 – 6	Sydney Roosters	29 July	Wollongong Showground	Paul Simpkins	19,512
22	North Queensland Cowboys	16 – 36	St. George Illawarra Dragons	5 August	Willows Sports Complex	Tim Mander	21,021
23	Brisbane Broncos	4 – 24	St. George Illawarra Dragons	14 August	Lang Park	Tim Mander	48,995
24	St. George Illawarra Dragons	25 – 22	Parramatta Eels	21 August	Jubilee Oval	Paul Simpkins	17,523
25		BYE
26	St. George Illawarra Dragons	36 – 28	Newcastle Knights	4 September	Jubilee Oval	Tony Archer	15,867
FW1	St. George Illawarra Dragons	28 – 22	Cronulla-Sutherland Sharks	10 September	Wollongong Showground	Tony Archer	19,608
FW3	St. George Illawarra Dragons	12 – 20	Wests Tigers	24 September	Sydney Football Stadium	Tony Archer	41,260

== Notable events ==
- After losing their first four matches of the season, the Dragons (who were sitting on the bottom of the ladder at the time) won their first match in round five, defeating the previously-undefeated Manly Warringah Sea Eagles (who were sitting on the top) by 32–6 in Wollongong.
- In round twelve, St George Illawarra lost 16–24 to the Melbourne Storm at Olympic Park Stadium in Melbourne, a day after another red-and-white team, the Sydney Swans, were thrashed by St Kilda at Telstra Dome.
- In round fourteen, halfback Mathew Head suffered a season-ending knee injury in the club's 34–4 win over the North Queensland Cowboys. The result puts St George Illawarra into the NRL's top eight for the first time in the season.
- In round eighteen, five-eighth and captain Trent Barrett copped a one-game suspension from the tribunal after pleading guilty to striking Parramatta Eels hooker PJ Marsh in the second half. The 40–14 defeat proves to be a major turning point in the club's season, as they would win their final seven games (including a 25–22 win over the Eels in the rematch at Jubilee Oval) to finish second on the ladder, behind the Eels on percentage.
