= 2005 Wests Tigers season =

← 2004	2006 →

The 2005 Wests Tigers season was the 6th in the joint-venture club's history. They competed in the NRL's 2005 Telstra Premiership, captained by Mark O'Neill and Scott Prince and coached by Tim Sheens. The Tigers finished the regular season in 4th position before reaching the 2005 NRL grand final, their first. After a Clive Churchill Medal-winning performance by Prince, Wests won and claimed their maiden premiership.

== Regular season ==
The Tigers started the season at long odds for the 2005 premiership. The team had never qualified for a final series and had a relatively inexperienced squad. The season kicked off with a home game against Parramatta. The game turned when fullback Brett Hodgson had to leave the field with an eye injury. Two late tries allowed the Eels to wrap up the game. For Round 2 the team had a bye. In round 3 against defending premiers, the Bulldogs, the Tigers trailed 0–12 and 6–18 before scoring thirty unanswered points to lead 36–18 with 10 minutes remaining. The Bulldogs, inspired by Braith Anasta, fought back to tie the game 36–36. With extra time seeming inevitable, a Dogs' error gave the Tigers possession and, with seconds remaining, a Scott Prince field goal gave the side its first win. In Round 4 the Tigers beat the other 2004 grand finalists with a hard-fought 26–16 win. A win followed against New Zealand in the rain in Christchurch (a Tigers home game).

In rounds 6–9 the team lost four games in a row despite often being competitive. The losing streak ended against the winless Newcastle Knights. During rounds 11–15 the Tigers remained in the bottom half of the table mixing promising wins with heavy defeats. They then shocked the league by going on a club record eight game winning streak. With victory against the Cowboys they guaranteed their first ever finals appearance. The winning streak included a club record 54–2 win over defending premiers, the Bulldogs. Despite losses in the final two games the Tigers finished in the top four and earned a home semi-final.

=== Season results ===
Wests Tigers 2005 Season Results
Round	Opponent	Result	Date	Venue	Crowd	Referee	Position/15
1	Parramatta Eels	Loss	12 March 2005	Telstra Stadium (H)	17,107	Russell Smith	13th
1	Parramatta Eels	12 - Wests Tigers (Tries: Richards, Whatuira; Goals: Hodgson 2) 28 - Eels (Tries: Cannings, Morris, Morrison, Peek, Tahu; Goals: Burt 4)					13th
2	Bye						11th
3	Bulldogs	Win	27 March 2005	Telstra Stadium (A)	19,984	Paul Simpkins	8th
3	Bulldogs	36 - Bulldogs (Tries: Anasta 2, Patten, Lolesi, Ryan, Sherwin; Goals: El Masri 6) 37 - Wests Tigers (Tries: Prince 2, Wilson, Harrison, Fitzhenry, Hodgson; Goals: Hodgson 6; Field Goals: Prince)					8th
4	Sydney Roosters	Win	3 April 2005	Sydney Football Stadium (A)	13,946	Steve Clark	
4	Sydney Roosters	26 - Roosters (Tries: Wing, Flannery, Monaghan, Tupou, Roberts; Goals: Robert 2, Fitzgibbon 1) 32 - Wests Tigers (Tries: Prince, Richards, Laffranchi, Whatuira, Heighington; Goals: Hodgson 6)					
5	New Zealand Warriors	Win	9 April 2005	Jade Stadium (H)	18,421	Jason Robinson	4th
5	New Zealand Warriors	24 - Wests Tigers (Tries: Whatuira 2, Prince, Richards; Goals: Hodgson 4) 6 - Warriors (Tries: Byrne; Goals: Jones)					4th
6	North Queensland Cowboys	Loss	16 April 2005	Dairy Farmers Stadium (A)	20,361	Sean Hampstead	6th
6	North Queensland Cowboys	44 - Cowboys (Tries: Sing 3, B Bowen 2, Lowe, Bowman, Jensen; Goals: Thurston 5, Rauhihi) 20 - Wests Tigers (Tries: Wilson, Fitzhenry, Whatuira, Marshall; Goals: Hodgson 2)					6th
7	Parramatta Eels	Loss	23 April 2005	Parramatta Stadium (A)	18,107	Steve Clark	9th
7	Parramatta Eels	26 - Eels (Tries: Grothe 2, Morrison, Tahu, Wagon; Goals: Burt 3) 16 - Wests Tigers (Tries: Farah 2, Richards; Goals: Hodgson 2)					9th
8	St. George Illawarra Dragons	Loss	1 May 2005	Telstra Stadium (H)	17,567	Jason Robinson	
8	St. George Illawarra Dragons	32 - Wests Tigers (Tries: Fulton 2, Payten, Laffranchi, Hodgson; Goals: Hodgson 6) 40 - Dragons (Tries: Gasnier 2, Torrens 2, Hornby, Creagh, Best; Goals: Ennis 4, Head 2)					
9	Manly Sea Eagles	Loss	8 May 2005	Brookvale Oval (A)	14,247	Russell Smith	13th
9	Manly Sea Eagles	34 - Sea Eagles (Tries: Kennedy 3, B Stewart, Hicks, Witt; Goals: Witt 5) 26 - Wests Tigers (Tries: Whatuira, Prince, Rieck, Fulton, Laffranchi; Goals: Hodgson 3)					13th
10	Newcastle Knights	Win	15 May 2005	EnergyAustralia Stadium (A)	15,881	Tony Archer	10th
10	Newcastle Knights	16 - Knights (Tries: Quinn 2, Thaiday; Goals: Campbell 2) 32 - Wests Tigers (Tries: Whatuira 2, Reick 2, Richards, Fulton; Goals: Hodgson 4)					10th
11	Canberra Raiders	Win	22 May 2005	Campbelltown (H)	18,436	Sean Hampstead	10th
11	Canberra Raiders	28 - Wests Tigers (Tries: Whatuira 2, Heighington, Marshall, Farah; Goals: Hodgson 4) 16 - Raiders (Tries: Graham, Withers, Chalk; Goals: Gafa 2)					10th
12	New Zealand Warriors	Loss	29 May 2005	Mt Smart Stadium (A)	9,420	Shayne Hayne	11th
12	New Zealand Warriors	21 - Warriors (Tries: Toopi 2, Villasanti, Byrne; Goals: Jones, Hohaia; Field Goals: Jones) 4 - Wests Tigers (Tries: Richards)					11th
13	Melbourne Storm	Loss	5 June 2005	Leichhardt Oval (H)	17,127	Tony Archer	11th
13	Melbourne Storm	14 - Wests Tigers (Tries: Elford, Wilson; Goals: Hodgson 3) 30 - Storm (Tries: Slater 2, Webster, Bell, Geyer; Goals: Orford 3, C Smith 2)					11th
14	Cronulla Sharks	Win	10 June 2005	Campbelltown Stadium (H)	17,570	Paul Simpkins	11th
14	Cronulla Sharks	34 - Wests Tigers (Tries: Marshall 2, Richards 2, Hodgson 2; Goals: Hodgson 5) 18 - Sharks (Tries: Williams, Galloway, Bird; Goals: Covell 3)					11th
15	Brisbane Broncos	Loss	18 June 2005	Suncorp Stadium (A)	25,780	Russell Smith	12th
15	Brisbane Broncos	40 - Broncos (Tries: S Berrigan 2, Michaels, Carlaw, Hunt, Hodges, Lockyer; Goals: Lockyer 6) 22 - Wests Tigers (Tries: Marshall 2, Fitzhenry, Richards; Goals: Hodgson 3)					12th
16	St. George Illawarra Dragons	Win	26 June 2005	Oki Jubilee Stadium (A)	10,612	Shayne Hayne	12th
16	St. George Illawarra Dragons	24 - Dragons (Tries: Payne, Creagh, Sims, Ennis; Goals: Ennis 4) 32 - Wests Tigers (Tries: Richards 2, Marshall, Laffranchi, Galea, Hodgson; Goals: Hodgson 4)					12th
17	Manly Sea Eagles	Win	1 July 2005	Leichhardt Oval (H)	15,271	Steve Clark	10th
17	Manly Sea Eagles	49 - Wests Tigers (Tries: Marshall 2, Galea, Fulton, Heighington, Farah, Whatuira, Elford; Goals: Hodgson 8; Field Goals: Prince) 24 - Sea Eagles (Tries: Harris 2, B Stewart 2; Goals: Witt 4)					10th
18	Sydney Roosters	Win	10 July 2005	Telstra Stadium (H)	13,768	Sean Hampstead	9th
18	Sydney Roosters	26 - Wests Tigers (Tries: Galea, Whatuira, Marshall, Hodgson; Goals: Hodgson 5) 16 - Roosters (Tries: Finch, Monaghan, Roberts; Goals: Fitzgibbon 2)					9th
19	Bye						7th
20	South Sydney Rabbitohs	Win	24 July 2005	Leichhardt Oval (H)	22,877	Russell Smith	6th
20	South Sydney Rabbitohs	42 - Wests Tigers (Tries: Farah 3, Elford, Prince, Fulton, Richards; Goals: Hodgson 7) 20 - Rabbitohs (Tries: L MacDougall 2, Sutton, Polglase; Goals: Champion 2)					6th
21	Cronulla Sharks	Win	31 July 2005	Toyota Park (A)	18,321	Tony Archer	5th
21	Cronulla Sharks	6 - Sharks (Tries: Peachey; Goals: Merritt) 46 - Wests Tigers (Tries: Prince 3, Richards, Marshall, Fitzhenry, Halatau, Hodgson; Goals: Hodgson 7)					5th
22	Canberra Raiders	Win	7 August 2005	Bruce Stadium (A)	15,195	Tony Archer	4th
22	Canberra Raiders	14 - Raiders (Tries: D Howell, Graham, Mogg; Goals: Schifcofske) 22 - Wests Tigers (Tries: Hodgson 2, Fitzhenry, Farah; Goals: Hodgson 3)					4th
23	North Queensland Cowboys	Win	14 August 2005	Campbelltown Stadium (H)	20,527	Steve Clark	4th
23	North Queensland Cowboys	28 - Wests Tigers (Tries: Prince, Halatau, Collis, Skandalis, Hodgson; Goals: Hodgson 4) 16 - Cowboys (Tries: Williams, Sargent, M Bowen; Goals: Thurston 2)					4th
24	Bulldogs	Win	19 August 2005	Telstra Stadium (H)	Steve Clark	29,542	4th
24	Bulldogs	54 - Wests Tigers (Tries: Whatuira 3, Richards 2, Galea, Hodgson, Marshall, Prince; Goals: Hodgson 9 ) 2 - Bulldogs (Goals: Young)					4th
25	Melbourne Storm	Loss	27 August 2005	Olympic Park (A)	10,050	Paul Simpkins	4th
25	Melbourne Storm	34 - Storm (Tries: Geyer, Bell, Inglis, Kaufusi, Orford, C Smith; Goals: Orford 5) 22 - Wests Tigers (Tries: Fitzhenry 2, Whatuira, Richards; Goals: Hodgson 3)					4th
26	Penrith Panthers	Loss	4 September 2005	Telstra Stadium (H)	17,256	Shayne Hayne	4th
26	Penrith Panthers	22 - Wests Tigers (Tries: Richards 2, Whatuira, Marshall; Goals: Hodgson 3) 38 - Panthers (Tries: Howland 2, Waterhouse, Swain, Priddis, Rodney, Clinton; Goals: Campbell 5)					4th

=== Players used ===
No.

Position
Player

Ray Cashmere – PR Dean Collis – CE Shane Elford – CE Robbie Farah – HK Daniel Fitzhenry – WG Liam Fulton – LK Bryce Gibbs – PR Ben Galea – LK Dene Halatau – SR Bronson Harrison – SR Chris Heighington – LK Brett Hodgson – FB Matt Jobson – PR

No.

Position
Player

Anthony Laffranchi – PR Benji Marshall – FE Shannon McDonnell – FB Robert Miles – WG Mark O'Neill (captain) – SR Todd Payten – PR Scott Prince (captain) – HB Matthew Rieck – WG Ben Reynolds – HB Pat Richards – WG John Skandalis – PR Paul Whatuira – CE John Wilson – SR

=== Ladder ===
2005 NRL season
Pos	Team	Pld	W	D	L	B	PF	PA	PD	Pts
1	Parramatta Eels	24	16	0	8	2	704	456	+248	36
2	St George Illawarra Dragons	24	16	0	8	2	655	510	+145	36
3	Brisbane Broncos	24	15	0	9	2	597	484	+113	34
4	Wests Tigers (P)	24	14	0	10	2	676	575	+101	32
5	North Queensland Cowboys	24	14	0	10	2	639	563	+76	32
6	Melbourne Storm	24	13	0	11	2	640	462	+178	30
7	Cronulla-Sutherland Sharks	24	12	0	12	2	550	564	-14	28
8	Manly-Warringah Sea Eagles	24	12	0	12	2	554	632	-78	28
9	Sydney Roosters	24	11	0	13	2	488	487	+1	26
10	Penrith Panthers	24	11	0	13	2	554	554	0	26
11	New Zealand Warriors	24	10	0	14	2	515	528	-13	24
12	Canterbury-Bankstown Bulldogs	24	9	1	14	2	472	670	-198	23
13	South Sydney Rabbitohs	24	9	1	14	2	482	700	-218	23
14	Canberra Raiders	24	9	0	15	2	465	606	-141	22
15	Newcastle Knights	24	8	0	16	2	467	667	-200	20

== Finals Series ==
The Tigers played their first ever semi-final against fifth placed North Queensland Cowboys, a team who had played in the 2004 final series. After a tight opening, the Tigers ran riot to score a 50–6 win. Both teams qualified for week two with the Tigers meeting six time premiers the Brisbane Broncos in a knock-out game. The Broncos dominated early possession with Benji Marshall preventing a Darren Smith try before scoring a long range intercept try against the run of the play. Towards the end of the game the Tigers kicked clear to win comfortably. The win saw the Tigers meet the Dragons in a Grand Final qualifier. In the lead up to the game there was controversy over the venue with calls for the game to be moved from Sydney Football Stadium to the much larger Telstra Stadium. As the Dragons had qualified for this game after week one their fans had an extra week to buy tickets to the game. As a result, the majority of the capacity crowd were Dragons fans. An early Marshall try gave the Tigers a lead they never gave up. The 20–12 win meant the Tigers qualified for the Grand Final.

The Tigers scored the most points ever in a finals series, with 134, beating the Brisbane Broncos 1998 NRL finals season record of 124 points. As of 2021, this record stands.

Wests Tigers 2005 Finals Series Results
Round	Opponent	Result	Date	Venue	Crowd	Referee
Qualifying Final	North Queensland Cowboys	Win	9 September 2005	Telstra Stadium (H)	26,463	Paul Simpkins
Qualifying Final	North Queensland Cowboys	50 - Wests Tigers (Tries: Hodgson 3, Richards, Fulton, Whatuira, Fitzhenry, Elford; Goals: Hodgson 9) 6 - Cowboys (Tries: Sing; Goals: Hannay)				
Semi-Final	Brisbane Broncos	Win	18 September 2005	Sydney Football Stadium	36,563	Tim Mander
Semi-Final	Brisbane Broncos	34 - Wests Tigers (Tries: Fitzhenry 2, O'Neill, Prince, Marshall, Hodgson; Goals: Hodgson 5) 6 - Broncos (Tries: Lockyer; Goals: Seymour)				
Preliminary Final	St. George Illawarra Dragons	Win	24 September 2005	Sydney Football Stadium	41,260	Tim Mander
Preliminary Final	St. George Illawarra Dragons	20 - Wests Tigers (Tries: Halatau 2, Heighington, Marshall; Goals: Hodgson 2) 12 - Dragons (Tries: Barrett, Naiqama; Goals: Ennis 2)				
Grand Final	North Queensland Cowboys	Win	2 October 2005	Telstra Stadium	82,453	Tim Mander
Grand Final	North Queensland Cowboys	30 - Wests Tigers (Tries: Payten, Fitzhenry, Laffranchi, Richards, Gibbs; Goals: Hodgson 5) 16 - Cowboys (Tries: Sing, Norton, M Bowen; Goals: Hannay 2)				

== 2005 Grand Final ==
Both the Cowboys and the Wests Tigers were playing in their first ever grand final. The Cowboys scored early and led 6–0. A Cowboys error allowed Bryce Gibbs to score a try to level the game. In a game defining moment, Benji Marshall returned a kick beating several defenders before a flick pass to Pat Richards. Richards, who needed an injection to overcome a leg injury, pushed away from Rod Jensen to score, the Tigers leading 12–6 at the break. After half time Anthony Laffranchi crashed over the try-line for an 18–6 lead before the Cowboys hit back. A Daniel Fitzhenry try gave the Tigers a 24–12 lead. With two minutes to go the Cowboys crossed the try-line wide but the conversion attempt missed, leaving the score at 24–16. A try on full-time to Todd Payten saw a final scoreline of 30–16.
