= 2005 Bulldogs RLFC season =

Bulldogs RLFC
- 2005 season
- Head coach: Steve Folkes
- Captain: Andrew Ryan
- Top try scorer: Club: Braith Anasta and Hazem El Masri (11)
- Top points scorer: Club: Hazem El Masri (180)
- Highest home attendance: 33,105 v St. George Illawarra Dragons, round one
- Average home attendance: 18,038

The 2005 Bulldogs RLFC season was the 71st season in the club's history. They competed in the NRL's 2005 Telstra Premiership, finishing the regular season 12th.

== Squad movement ==
=== Gains ===
Player	Signed from	Notes
Chris Armit	Parramatta Eels	
Ben Czislowski	Brisbane Broncos	
Daniel Irvine	Parramatta Eels	
Makasini Richter	West Tigers	
Luke Young	Penrith Panthers	

=== Debuts ===
"Debut" means players who have not played in an elite Australian or European league competition previously.

- Daniel Conn
- Trent Cutler
- Filinga Filiga
- Dallas McIlwain
- Brad Morrin
- Nate Myles
- Cameron Phelps
- Charlie Tonga

=== Losses ===
Player	Signed To	Notes
Jamie Feeney	Melbourne Storm	
Ben Harris	Bradford Bulls	
Hutch Maiava	Cronulla-Sutherland Sharks	
Steve Price	New Zealand Warriors	
Dennis Scott	Melbourne Storm	
Johnathan Thurston	North Queensland Cowboys	

=== Left club/did not play ===
- Glen Hughes
- Adrian Rainey
- Trevor Thurling

== Ladder ==
2005 NRL season
Pos	Team	Pld	W	D	L	B	PF	PA	PD	Pts
1	Parramatta Eels	24	16	0	8	2	704	456	+248	36
2	St George Illawarra Dragons	24	16	0	8	2	655	510	+145	36
3	Brisbane Broncos	24	15	0	9	2	597	484	+113	34
4	Wests Tigers (P)	24	14	0	10	2	676	575	+101	32
5	North Queensland Cowboys	24	14	0	10	2	639	563	+76	32
6	Melbourne Storm	24	13	0	11	2	640	462	+178	30
7	Cronulla-Sutherland Sharks	24	12	0	12	2	550	564	-14	28
8	Manly-Warringah Sea Eagles	24	12	0	12	2	554	632	-78	28
9	Sydney Roosters	24	11	0	13	2	488	487	+1	26
10	Penrith Panthers	24	11	0	13	2	554	554	0	26
11	New Zealand Warriors	24	10	0	14	2	515	528	-13	24
12	Canterbury-Bankstown Bulldogs	24	9	1	14	2	472	670	-198	23
13	South Sydney Rabbitohs	24	9	1	14	2	482	700	-218	23
14	Canberra Raiders	24	9	0	15	2	465	606	-141	22
15	Newcastle Knights	24	8	0	16	2	467	667	-200	20

== Regular season ==
Date	Round	Opponent	Venue	Score	Tries	Goals	Attendance	Ladder Position
Friday 11 March	1	St George Illawarra Dragons	Telstra Stadium	46-28	Ryan (2), Anasta, Grimaldi, Hughes, Lolesi, Utai	Hazem El Masri (7/9)	33,105	2nd
Friday 18 March	2	North Queensland Cowboys	Dairy Farmers	12-24	Hazem El Masri, Sonny Bill Williams	Hazem El Masri (2/2)	21,138	6th
Sunday 27 March	3	West Tigers	Telstra Stadium	36-37	Braith Anasta (2), Jamahl Lolesi, Luke Patten, Ryan, Brent Sherwin	Hazem El Masri (6/6)	19,984	9th
Sunday 3 April	4	Cronulla-Sutherland Sharks	Toyota Stadium	12-26	Andrew Ryan, Willie Tonga	Hazem El Masri (2/2)	17,053	11th
	5							
Friday 15 April	6	Sydney Roosters	Telstra Stadium	16-29	Luke Patten, Willie Tonga, Matt Utai	Hazem El Masri	27,111	12th
Sunday 24 April	7	Newcastle Knights	EnergyAustralia Stadium	24-20	Luke Patten, Hazem El Masri, Brad Morrin	Hazem El Masri (4/4)	18,387	12th
Saturday 30 April	8	Parramatta Eels	Telstra Stadium	30-16	Hazem El Masri (3), Braith Anasta, Reni Maitua	Hazem El Masri (5/6)	24,957	9th
Sunday 8 May	9	Brisbane Broncos	Suncorp Stadium	28-35	Hazem El Masri (2), Braith Anasta, Nate Myles, Willie Tonga	Hazem El Masri (4/5)	29,845	11th
Saturday 14 May	10	Manly Warringah Sea Eagles	Telstra Stadium	10-18	Hazem El Masri	Hazem El Masri (1/2)	14,768	13th
Saturday 21 May	11	Melbourne Storm	Olympic Park	26-16	Hazem El Masri, Jamahl Lolesi, Luke Patten, Matt Utai	Hazem El Masri (5/5)	8,438	12th
Friday 27 May	12	North Queensland Cowboys	Carrara Stadium	12-48	Roy Asotasi	Hazem El Masri (4/4)	21,012	12th
Saturday 4 June	13	South Sydney Rabbitohs	Sydney Showground	21-21	Jamahl Lolesi (2), Chris Armit	Hazem El Masri (4/4), Brent Sherwin (FG)	8,911	12th
Sunday 19 June	15	Canberra Raiders	Sydney Showground	28-10	Braith Anasta, Corey Hughes, Luke Patten, Andrew Ryan, Matt Utai	Hazem El Masri (4/6)	8,496	10th
Sunday 26 June	16	Manly Warringah Sea Eagles	Brookvale Oval	31-12	Adam Brideson, Jamahl Lolesi, Dallas McIlwain, Luke Patten, Andrew Ryan	Hazem El Masri (5/7), Braith Anasta (FG)	14,429	10th
Saturday 2 July	17	Melbourne Storm	Sydney Showground	6-33	Cameron Phelps	Hazem El Masri (1/2)	7,414	11th
Sunday 10 July	18	New Zealand Warriors	Mt Smart	26-24	Braith Anasta (3), Dallas McIlwain	Hazem El Masri	12,822	11th
Friday 15 July	19	Penrith Panthers	Penrith Park	18-16	Reni Maitua (2), Hazem El Masri	Hazem El Masri (3/3)	16,270	10th
Friday 22 July	20	Brisbane Broncos	Telstra Stadium	29-22	Tony Grimaldi, Jamahl Lolesi, Mark O'Meley, Brent Sherwin, Matt Utai	Hazem El Masri (3/4), Braith Anasta (FG)	29,112	9th
Sunday 31 July	21	South Sydney Rabbitohs	Aussie Stadium	24-37	Reni Maitua (2), Braith Anasta, Cameron Phelps	Brent Sherwin (4/4)	13,062	9th
Saturday 6 August	22	Newcastle Knights	Telstra Stadium	13-28	Adam Brideson, Matt Utai	Brent Sherwin (1/1), Braith Anasta (1/1) (FG)	13,962	9th
Friday 12 August	23	Parramatta Eels	Parramatta Stadium	4-56	Cameron Phelps		20,289	9th
Friday 19 August	24	West Tigers	Telstra Stadium	2-54		Luke Young (1/1)	29,542	9th
Saturday 28 August	25	Penrith Panthers	Telstra Stadium	6-28	Braith Anasta	Luke Young (1/1)	10,599	11th
Sunday 4 September	26	Sydney Roosters	Aussie Stadium	12-32	Corey Hughes, Dallas McIlwain	Luke Young (2/2)	8,903	12th

== Player statistics ==
Player	Age	App	Int	T	G	FG	Pts
Braith Anasta	23	23		11	1	3	49
Chris Armit	21	5	19	1	0	0	4
Roy Asotasi	23	22	2	1	0	0	4
Adam Brideson	24	8	8	2	0	0	8
Daniel Conn	19	0	3	0	0	0	0
Trent Cutler	21	1	4	0	0	0	0
Ben Czislowski	22	1	6	0	0	0	0
Hazem El Masri	29	18	0	11	68	0	180
Filinga Filiga	20	2	0	0	0	0	0
Tony Grimaldi	30	24	0	2	0	0	8
Ben Harris	21	0	2	0	0	0	0
Corey Hughes	27	19	2	3	0	0	12
Daniel Irvine	23	0	4	0	0	0	0
Jamahl Lolesi	24	24	0	7	0	0	28
Dallas McIlwain	23	6	9	3	0	0	12
Reni Maitua	23	9	2	5	0	0	20
Willie Mason	25	7	2	0	0	0	0
Brad Morrin	23	2	4	1	0	0	4
Nate Myles	20	8	11	1	0	0	4
Brett Oliver	22	0	1	0	0	0	0
Mark O'Meley	24	14	0	1	0	0	4
Luke Patten	25	16	0	7	0	0	28
Adam Perry	26	7	6	1	0	0	4
Cameron Phelps	20	12	1	3	0	0	12
Makasini Richter	26	2	0	0	0	0	0
Andrew Ryan	26	22	0	6	0	0	24
Brent Sherwin	27	19	1	2	5	1	19
Charlie Tonga	27	3	7	0	0	0	0
Willie Tonga	22	8	0	3	0	0	12
Matt Utai	24	23	0	6	0	0	24
Sonny Bill Williams	20	3	2	1	0	0	4
Luke Young	25	4	0	0	4	0	8

=== Notes ===
- Age = Age at the end of 2005
- App = Starting appearances
- Int = Interchange appearances
- T = Tries
- G = Goals
- FG = Field Goals
- Pts = Points

== Representatives ==
The following players have played a representative match in 2005.

	State Of Origin 1	State Of Origin 2	State of Origin 3	City Vs Country	ANZAC Test	Tri-Nations	France vs Australia
Braith Anasta		New South Wales	New South Wales	City	-	-	-
Roy Asotasi		-	-	-	New Zealand	New Zealand	-
Hazem El Masri		-	-	City	-	-	-
Jamahl Lolesi		-	-	-	New Zealand	-	-
Reni Maitua		-	-	City	-	-	-
Willie Mason				Country		Australia	Australia
Mark O'Meley					Australia	Australia	Australia
Andrew Ryan	New South Wales	New South Wales	New South Wales	Country		Australia	Australia
Brent Sherwin				City			
Willie Tonga					Australia		
Matt Utai					New Zealand		

== See also ==
- List of Canterbury-Bankstown Bulldogs seasons
