= 2005 North Queensland Cowboys season =

Coordinates: 19°18′58″S 146°42′43″E

- NRL Rank: 5th
- Play-off result: Lost Grand Final
- 2005 record: Wins: 14; draws: 0; losses: 10
- Points scored: For: 639; against: 563

Team information
- CEO: Denis Keeffe
- Coach: Graham Murray
- Captain: Travis Norton
- Stadium: Dairy Farmers Stadium
- Avg. attendance: 20,590
- High attendance: 22,477 (vs. Brisbane Broncos, Round 10)

Top scorers
- Tries: Matthew Bowen (20)
- Goals: Josh Hannay (62)
- Points: Josh Hannay (152)
← 2004	2006 →

The 2004 North Queensland Cowboys season was the 11th in the club's history. Coached by Graham Murray and captained by Travis Norton, they competed in the NRL's 2005 Telstra Premiership. They finished the regular season in 5th and played in their first Grand Final, which they lost to the Wests Tigers.

== Season summary ==
=== Milestones ===
- Round 1: Justin Smith, Johnathan Thurston and Carl Webb made their debuts for the club.
- Round 4: Paul Rauhihi played his 50th game for the club.
- Round 8: Paul Bowman scored his 50th try for the club.
- Round 9: Jaiman Lowe played his 50th game for the club.
- Round 9: Paul Bowman played his 150th game for the club.
- Round 9: Matt Sing scored his 50th try for the club.
- Round 16: Matthew Bowen scored his 50th try for the club.
- Round 18: Aaron Payne played his 50th game for the club.
- Round 20: Brett Firman made his debut for the club.
- Round 21: Ty Williams scored his 50th try for the club.
- Round 23: Matthew Bowen played his 100th game for the club.
- Finals Week 2: Luke O'Donnell played his 50th game for the club.

== Squad List ==
North Queensland Cowboys NRL Squad 2005
First team squad			Coaching staff
Clint Amos – HK; Jason Barsley – CE; Brenton Bowen – WG; Matthew Bowen – FB; Paul Bowman – CE; Gavin Cooper – SR; Mark Dalle Cort – SR; David Faiumu – HK; Brett Firman – HB; Josh Hannay – CE; Rod Jensen – LK; Jacob Lillyman – SR	Ben Lowe – LK; Jaiman Lowe – PR; Micheal Luck – SR; Brent McConnell – HB; Leigh McWilliams – HK; Shane Muspratt – HK; David Myles – FE; Travis Norton (c) – LK; Luke O'Donnell – SR; Aaron Payne – HK; Paul Rauhihi – PR; Mitchell Sargent – PR	Matthew Scott – PR; Chris Sheppard – FE; Matt Sing – WG; Justin Smith – FE; Steve Southern – SR; Daniel Strickland – SR; Neil Sweeney – WG; Johnathan Thurston – HB; Shane Tronc – PR; Carl Webb – PR; Ty Williams – WG	Head coach: Graham Murray; Assistant coaches: Neil Henry (assistant coach); Kelly Egan (assistant coach); Billy Johnstone (strength & conditioning coach); Glen Murphy (Head trainer); Legend: (c) Captain(s); (vc) Vice-captain(s)

== Squad Movement ==
=== 2005 Gains ===
Player	Signed From
Jason Barsley	Easts Tigers
Rory Bromley	Central Comets
Gavin Cooper	Redcliffe Dolphins
Brett Firman	Sydney Roosters (mid-season)
Keiran Kerr	Wests Tigers
Brent McConnell	Burleigh Bears
Shane Muspratt	Parramatta Eels
Justin Smith	South Sydney Rabbitohs
Malo Solomona	Richmond Rovers
Johnathan Thurston	Canterbury Bulldogs
Carl Webb	Brisbane Broncos

=== 2005 Losses ===
Player	Signed From
Kevin Campion	Retired
Nathan Fien	Warriors
Steven Goodhew	Easts Tigers
Keiran Kerr	Widnes Vikings (mid-season)
Ben Laity	Released
Jamie McDonald	Melbourne Storm
Michael Meigan	Balmain Tigers
Aaron Morgan	Norths Devils
Glenn Morrison	Parramatta Eels
Chris Sheppard	St George Illawarra Dragons (mid-season)
Daniel Sorbello	Wynnum Manly Seagulls
Hale Vaa'sa	Easts Tigers
Derrick Watkins	Brisbane Broncos

== Ladder ==
2005 NRL season
Pos	Team	Pld	W	D	L	B	PF	PA	PD	Pts
1	Parramatta Eels	24	16	0	8	2	704	456	+248	36
2	St George Illawarra Dragons	24	16	0	8	2	655	510	+145	36
3	Brisbane Broncos	24	15	0	9	2	597	484	+113	34
4	Wests Tigers (P)	24	14	0	10	2	676	575	+101	32
5	North Queensland Cowboys	24	14	0	10	2	639	563	+76	32
6	Melbourne Storm	24	13	0	11	2	640	462	+178	30
7	Cronulla-Sutherland Sharks	24	12	0	12	2	550	564	-14	28
8	Manly-Warringah Sea Eagles	24	12	0	12	2	554	632	-78	28
9	Sydney Roosters	24	11	0	13	2	488	487	+1	26
10	Penrith Panthers	24	11	0	13	2	554	554	0	26
11	New Zealand Warriors	24	10	0	14	2	515	528	-13	24
12	Canterbury-Bankstown Bulldogs	24	9	1	14	2	472	670	-198	23
13	South Sydney Rabbitohs	24	9	1	14	2	482	700	-218	23
14	Canberra Raiders	24	9	0	15	2	465	606	-141	22
15	Newcastle Knights	24	8	0	16	2	467	667	-200	20

== Fixtures ==
=== Regular season ===
Date	Round	Opponent	Venue	Score	Tries	Goals	Attendance
13 March	Round 1	Brisbane Broncos	Suncorp Stadium	16 – 29	M. Bowen, Jensen, Williams	Hannay (2/3)	43,488
18 March	Round 2	Canterbury Bulldogs	Dairy Farmers Stadium	24 – 12	M. Bowen, Hannay, Webb, Williams	Hannay (4/7)	21,138
27 March	Round 3	Warriors	Ericsson Stadium	32 – 22	Jensen (2), M. Bowen, Southern, Williams	Hannay (5/7), Thurston (1/1)	13,888
2 April	Round 4	Newcastle Knights	Dairy Farmers Stadium	52 – 18	Hannay (2), Sing (2), M. Bowen, Smith, Southern, Thurston, Williams	Hannay (5/7), Smith (2/2), Myles (1/1)	22,347
9 April	Round 5	Cronulla Sharks	Toyota Park	6 – 38	Webb	Hannay (1/1)	17,323
16 April	Round 6	Wests Tigers	Dairy Farmers Stadium	44 – 20	Sing (3), B. Bowen (2), Bowman, Jensen, Lowe	Thurston (5/7), Rauhihi (1/1)	20,361
23 April	Round 7	Penrith Panthers	Penrith Stadium	36 – 22	M. Bowen (2), Jensen (2), B. Bowen, Luck	Hannay (6/6)	17,998
30 April	Round 8	Sydney Roosters	Dairy Farmers Stadium	38 – 18	Bowman (2), M. Bowen, Faiumu, Hannay, O'Donnell, Smith	Hannay (5/9)	22,476
8 May	Round 9	Parramatta Eels	Parramatta Stadium	12 – 50	Faiumu, Sing	Hannay (2/2)	8,051
14 May	Round 10	Brisbane Broncos	Dairy Farmers Stadium	6 – 23	M. Bowen	Hannay (1/2)	22,477
	Round 11	Bye					
27 May	Round 12	Canterbury Bulldogs	Carrara Stadium	48 – 12	Williams (2), M. Bowen, Lillyman, Payne, Southern, Thurston, Tronc	Smith (4/4), Thurston (4/4)	21,012
4 June	Round 13	Cronulla Sharks	Dairy Farmers Stadium	56 – 14	Bowman (2), Sing (2), Smith (2), B. Bowen, M. Bowen, Payne, Webb	Smith (4/5), Thurston (4/5)	20,843
12 June	Round 14	St George Illawarra Dragons	Oki Jubilee Stadium	4 – 34	Barsley	Hannay (0/1)	15,260
	Round 15	Bye					
25 June	Round 16	Canberra Raiders	Canberra Stadium	22 – 23	M. Bowen, Bowman, Thurston	Thurston (3/4)	9,129
2 July	Round 17	Warriors	Dairy Farmers Stadium	24 – 16	Jensen (2), Sweeney (2), Faiumu	Hannay (2/5)	20,078
10 July	Round 18	Newcastle Knights	EnergyAustralia Stadium	18 – 22	B. Bowen, Bowman, Sing, Williams	Hannay (1/4)	11,864
16 July	Round 19	South Sydney Rabbitohs	Dairy Farmers Stadium	14 – 16	Sing, Smith, Williams	Thurston (1/3)	17,038
23 July	Round 20	Penrith Panthers	Dairy Farmers Stadium	38 – 18	Hannay (2), M. Bowen, Firman, Thurston, Williams	Hannay (6/7), Thurston (1/1)	18,932
31 July	Round 21	Manly Sea Eagles	Brookvale Oval	26 – 24	Williams (3), Jensen, Payne	Hannay (3/5)	13,118
5 August	Round 22	St George Illawarra Dragons	Dairy Farmers Stadium	16 – 36	M. Bowen, Bowman, Jensen	Hannay (2/3)	21,021
14 August	Round 23	Wests Tigers	Campbelltown Stadium	16 – 28	M. Bowen, Sargent, Williams	Thurston (2/3)	20,527
20 August	Round 24	Canberra Raiders	Dairy Farmers Stadium	31 – 28	Payne (2), M. Bowen, Thurston, Williams	Hannay (5/5), Thurston (1 FG)	17,893
28 August	Round 25	South Sydney Rabbitohs	Central Coast Stadium	30 – 16	Sing (3), Faiumu, Norton, O'Donnell	Hannay (3/7)	13,079
3 September	Round 26	Melbourne Storm	Dairy Farmers Stadium	30 – 24	M. Bowen (2), Bowman, Sing, Williams	Thurston (5/6)	22,471
Legend: Win Loss Draw Bye

=== Finals ===
Date	Round	Opponent	Venue	Score	Tries	Goals	Attendance
9 September	Qualifying Final	Wests Tigers	Telstra Stadium	6 – 50	Sing	Hannay (1/1)	26,463
17 September	Semi Final	Melbourne Storm	Aussie Stadium	24 – 16	Williams (2), M. Bowen, Faiumu	Hannay (2/3), Thurston (2/2)	16,810
25 September	Preliminary Final	Parramatta Eels	Telstra Stadium	29 – 0	M. Bowen, Firman, Hannay, Jensen, Williams	Hannay (4/6), Thurston (1 FG)	44,327
2 October	Grand Final	Wests Tigers	Telstra Stadium	16 – 30	M. Bowen, Bowman, Sing	Hannay (2/3)	82,453
Legend: Win Loss Draw Bye

== Statistics ==
Name	App	T	G	FG	Pts
Jason Barsley	1	-	-	-	-
Brenton Bowen	10	5	-	-	20
Matthew Bowen	25	21	-	-	84
Paul Bowman	25	9	-	-	36
David Faiumu	21	5	-	-	20
Brett Firman	11	2	-	-	8
Josh Hannay	21	7	62	-	152
Rod Jensen	23	11	-	-	44
Jacob Lillyman	12	1	-	-	4
Jaiman Lowe	8	1	-	-	4
Micheal Luck	9	1	-	-	4
Leigh McWilliams	7	-	-	-	-
David Myles	7	-	1	-	2
Travis Norton	17	2	-	-	8
Luke O'Donnell	26	2	-	-	8
Aaron Payne	28	5	-	-	20
Paul Rauhihi	26	-	1	-	2
Mitchell Sargent	19	1	-	-	4
Matthew Scott	3	-	-	-	-
Chris Sheppard	5	-	-	-	-
Matt Sing	25	16	-	-	64
Justin Smith	25	5	10	-	40
Steve Southern	27	3	-	-	12
Neil Sweeney	3	2	-	-	8
Johnathan Thurston	26	5	28	2	78
Shane Tronc	27	1	-	-	4
Carl Webb	16	3	-	-	12
Ty Williams	23	18	-	-	72
Totals		127	102	2	714

== Representatives ==
The following players played a representative match in 2005.

	ANZAC Test	City vs Country	State of Origin 1	State of Origin 2	State of Origin 3	Tri-Nations
Matthew Bowen	-	-	Queensland	Queensland	Queensland	-
Paul Bowman	-	-	Queensland	Queensland	Queensland	-
David Faiumu	-	-	-	-	-	New Zealand
Luke O'Donnell	City	-	-	-	-	Australia
Paul Rauhihi	New Zealand	-	-	-	-	New Zealand
Matt Sing	Australia	-	Queensland	Queensland	Queensland	-
Johnathan Thurston	-	-	Queensland	Queensland	Queensland	-
Carl Webb	-	-	Queensland	Queensland	-	-
Ty Williams	-	-	Queensland	Queensland	Queensland	-

== Honours ==
=== League ===
- Dally M Medal: Johnathan Thurston
- Dally M Halfback of the Year: Johnathan Thurston
- Rugby League Players Association Player of the Year: Johnathan Thurston

=== Club ===
- Player of the Year: Johnathan Thurston
- Players' Player: Paul Bowman
- Club Person of the Year: Rod Jensen

== Feeder Clubs ==
=== Queensland Cup ===
- North Queensland Young Guns – 1st, Premiers
