= List of Wests Tigers honours =

The following is a list of titles won by the National Rugby League club, the Wests Tigers, since their inception in 2000.

== Premierships ==
The Wests Tigers won the 2005 NRL Grand Final.

Year	Opponent	Competition	Score
2005	North Queensland Cowboys	National Rugby League	30–16

== Finals appearances ==
The Wests Tigers have made three top-eight appearances.

Year	Ladder Position	Finals Result
2005	4th	Premiers
2010	3rd	Preliminary Final
2011	4th	Semi Final

== World Club Challenges ==
The Wests Tigers participated in one World Club Challenge in February 2006.

Year	Opponent	Result	Score
2006	Bradford Bulls	Loss	10–30

== Rugby League World Sevens ==
The Wests Tigers won the final Rugby League World Sevens in 2004, taking home prize money of $100,000. This was the first title won by the merged club.

Year	Opponent	Result	Score
2004	Parramatta Eels	Win	18–7
