= 2005 Parramatta Eels season =

Australia Rugby League Parramatta Eels 2005 season

- NRL Rank: 1st
- Play-off result: Preliminary Finalists (Lost 0–29 vs North Queensland Cowboys, 2nd Preliminary Final)
- World Club Challenge: DNQ
- 2005 record: Wins: 16; draws: 0; losses: 8
- Points scored: For: 704; against: 456

Team information
- CEO: Denis Fitzgerald
- Coach: (Australia) Brian Smith
- Captain: (New Zealand) Nathan Cayless
- Stadium: Parramatta Stadium (Capacity: 20,741); Waikato Stadium (Capacity: 25,800)
- Avg. attendance: 16,264 (Home); 15,670 (Home & Away); 16,706 (Finals Series)
- Agg. attendance: 195,169 (Home); 400,950 (Home & Away); 64,037 (Finals Series)
- High attendance: 44,327 (25 September vs North Queensland Cowboys, 2nd Preliminary Final)

Top scorers
- Tries: (Australia) Eric Grothe Jr (16)
- Goals: (Australia) Luke Burt (92)
- Points: (Australia) Luke Burt (214)
← 2004	List of seasons	2006 →

The 2005 Parramatta Eels season was the 59th in the club's history. Coached by Brian Smith and captained by Nathan Cayless, they competed in the NRL's 2005 Telstra Premiership. The Eels finished the home and away season on top of the ladder to claim the minor premiership, but were knocked out in the preliminary final, going down 0–29 to the North Queensland Cowboys.

== Summary ==
The 2005 season marked a resurgence of the Parramatta Eels; after two years in the wilderness, the club were back into premiership contention after ending the season as minor premiers on 36 points, ahead of the St. George Illawarra Dragons on points differential. The first week of the 2005 Finals Series saw a comfortable 46–22 win over the Manly-Warringah Sea Eagles, who were in their first finals campaign since the creation of the National Rugby League in 1998. Following the week off, Parramatta were beaten by the Johnathan Thurston-led North Queensland at ANZ Stadium, 29–0, ending another season in disappointment.

Adding further salt to the wound, Parramatta's inspirational forward Nathan Hindmarsh missed the entire finals series and popular cult figure Fuifui Moimoi was suspended in the final round of the season, also missing the finals. Parramatta had also defeated eventual premiers the Wests Tigers twice throughout the season, defeated St. George Illawarra and also recorded a 50–12 victory over North Queensland earlier in the year.

== Standings ==
2005 NRL season
Pos	Team	Pld	W	D	L	B	PF	PA	PD	Pts
1	Parramatta Eels	24	16	0	8	2	704	456	+248	36
2	St George Illawarra Dragons	24	16	0	8	2	655	510	+145	36
3	Brisbane Broncos	24	15	0	9	2	597	484	+113	34
4	Wests Tigers (P)	24	14	0	10	2	676	575	+101	32
5	North Queensland Cowboys	24	14	0	10	2	639	563	+76	32
6	Melbourne Storm	24	13	0	11	2	640	462	+178	30
7	Cronulla-Sutherland Sharks	24	12	0	12	2	550	564	-14	28
8	Manly-Warringah Sea Eagles	24	12	0	12	2	554	632	-78	28
9	Sydney Roosters	24	11	0	13	2	488	487	+1	26
10	Penrith Panthers	24	11	0	13	2	554	554	0	26
11	New Zealand Warriors	24	10	0	14	2	515	528	-13	24
12	Canterbury-Bankstown Bulldogs	24	9	1	14	2	472	670	-198	23
13	South Sydney Rabbitohs	24	9	1	14	2	482	700	-218	23
14	Canberra Raiders	24	9	0	15	2	465	606	-141	22
15	Newcastle Knights	24	8	0	16	2	467	667	-200	20

== Awards ==
The following awards were awarded in the post-season:

- Michael Cronin Clubman of the Year Award: Mark Riddell
- Ken Thornett Medal (Players' Player): Nathan Cayless/Timana Tahu
- Jack Gibson Award (Coach's Award): Glenn Morrison
- Eric Grothe Rookie of the Year Award: Tim Smith
