= 2005 Manly-Warringah Sea Eagles season =

← 2004	2006 →

The 2005 Manly-Warringah Sea Eagles season was the 59th in the club's history. Coached by Des Hasler and captained by Michael Monaghan, they competed in the National Rugby League's 2005 Telstra Premiership, finishing 8th (out of 15), just reaching the finals series. The Sea Eagles were then knocked out in their first play-off match by minor premiers, the Parramatta Eels.

Manly-Warringah made an unexpected bright start to the 2005 season, at one stage leading the competition outright after round seven. However their season was marred early by the dismissal of John Hopoate who was given a 17-match ban for striking Cronulla-Sutherland Sharks forward Keith Galloway in the round two match. Steve Matai made his first grade debut in that match, a late replacement after John Hopoate was suspended, then sacked by the club. Furthermore, the season overall was dominated by the team's fear of playing matches at night, with most of their defeats occurring under lights. This was pointed out by the Channel Nine commentators prior to its round eight, Friday night match against the Brisbane Broncos at Suncorp Stadium (which was in fact Manly's first Friday night match in six years) which the Sea Eagles indeed lost by a scoreline of 38–12.

Controversial physiologist, Steve Dank was working with the Sea Eagles this season. Manly's Ben Kennedy, Steve Menzies and Anthony Watmough were selected to play in the 2005 State of Origin series for New South Wales.

This season also marked the beginning of the Sea Eagles' rivalry with the Melbourne Storm. In round three, both teams had won their opening two matches leading into an early-season top-of-the-table match which Manly won 25–18. Although Manly's time at the top of the ladder was short-lived, it proved that Manly could compete with the best sides in the competition. In round five, Manly suffered an embarrassing 6–32 loss to the previously winless St. George Illawarra Dragons at WIN Stadium, a week after the Dragons were thrashed by the Canberra Raiders in Canberra. Manly were, however, able to beat the Raiders the following week, but failed to dislodge them from top spot on the ladder.

The Sea Eagles suffered a late-season form slump with injuries plaguing the club, however wins over the Broncos in round 22 and the Raiders in the final round ensured their first finals appearance since 1998. They were knocked out in the first round of the playoffs following 46–22 loss to the minor premiers Parramatta.

The club's leading try scorer was Brett Stewart with 16. Their leading point scorer was Michael Witt with 140.

== Ladder ==
2005 NRL season
Pos	Team	Pld	W	D	L	B	PF	PA	PD	Pts
1	Parramatta Eels	24	16	0	8	2	704	456	+248	36
2	St George Illawarra Dragons	24	16	0	8	2	655	510	+145	36
3	Brisbane Broncos	24	15	0	9	2	597	484	+113	34
4	Wests Tigers (P)	24	14	0	10	2	676	575	+101	32
5	North Queensland Cowboys	24	14	0	10	2	639	563	+76	32
6	Melbourne Storm	24	13	0	11	2	640	462	+178	30
7	Cronulla-Sutherland Sharks	24	12	0	12	2	550	564	-14	28
8	Manly-Warringah Sea Eagles	24	12	0	12	2	554	632	-78	28
9	Sydney Roosters	24	11	0	13	2	488	487	+1	26
10	Penrith Panthers	24	11	0	13	2	554	554	0	26
11	New Zealand Warriors	24	10	0	14	2	515	528	-13	24
12	Canterbury-Bankstown Bulldogs	24	9	1	14	2	472	670	-198	23
13	South Sydney Rabbitohs	24	9	1	14	2	482	700	-218	23
14	Canberra Raiders	24	9	0	15	2	465	606	-141	22
15	Newcastle Knights	24	8	0	16	2	467	667	-200	20
