= 2005 South Sydney Rabbitohs season =

- NRL rank: First Grade

Team information
- CEO: (Australia)
- Coach: (Australia) Shaun McRae
- Captain: (Australia)
- Stadium: Aussie Stadium

Top scorers
- Tries: (Australia)
- Goals: (Australia)
- Points: (Australia)
← 2004	2006 →

The 2005 South Sydney Rabbitohs season was the 96th in the club's history. Coached by Shaun McRae and captained by Bryan Fletcher and Peter Cusack, they competed in the National Rugby League's 2005 Telstra Premiership, finishing the regular season 13th out of 15 teams, failing to reach the finals.

In March, Souths life member Russell Crowe made the Rabbitohs the first club team in Australia to be sponsored by a film, when he negotiated a deal to advertise his movie Cinderella Man on their jerseys. The Rabbitohs' first win of the season was a 49–26 triumph over the Parramatta Eels in Round 2.

The Rabbitohs would be winless again until Round 5, when they defeated the Newcastle Knights 37–12 at Bluetongue Central Coast Stadium in Gosford, before a crowd of 16,162.

For the next eight rounds, the Rabbitohs suffered loss after loss to the NRL juggernauts (including form teams Melbourne, Brisbane and Manly with the only relief being the bye in Round 8. After a promising start, Season 2005 was shaping up much like the last few years for the Rabbitohs.

However Round 13 against the Bulldogs was to prove a turning point in the club's season. Souths held the reigning premiers to a shock 21-all draw, and thereafter, momentum suddenly seemed to be swinging back the Bunnies' way. A week later they hammered Manly 44–6, and though they went on to lose three more consecutively after that (including a second to arch-rivals St George Illawarra Dragons), they bounced back to win 5 of their last 6, beginning with a 24–14 win over Cronulla at the Sydney Football Stadium, and highlighted with a spirited 16-14 downing of the North Queensland Cowboys at Dairy Farmers Stadium in Townsville. Finally overcoming the Bulldogs in Round 21, the Rabbitohs also defeated the Sydney Roosters in Sydney 17–16 in a hard-fought and spiteful encounter. Their last match was against the Sharks at Toyota Stadium. Souths won this in convincing fashion, with young five-eighth John Sutton making a significant impression.

All in all, season 2005 was the most promising since re-admission; under coach Shaun McRae the team were beginning to look like a renewed force. Their reasonably strong finish handed the bottom place on the NRL ladder to the Newcastle Knights, therefore avoiding the horrible fate of receiving three wooden-spoons in a row. South Sydney finished the 2005 season level on 23 premiership points with 2004 premiers the Canterbury Bulldogs.

== Ladder ==
2005 NRL season
Pos	Team	Pld	W	D	L	B	PF	PA	PD	Pts
1	Parramatta Eels	24	16	0	8	2	704	456	+248	36
2	St George Illawarra Dragons	24	16	0	8	2	655	510	+145	36
3	Brisbane Broncos	24	15	0	9	2	597	484	+113	34
4	Wests Tigers (P)	24	14	0	10	2	676	575	+101	32
5	North Queensland Cowboys	24	14	0	10	2	639	563	+76	32
6	Melbourne Storm	24	13	0	11	2	640	462	+178	30
7	Cronulla-Sutherland Sharks	24	12	0	12	2	550	564	-14	28
8	Manly-Warringah Sea Eagles	24	12	0	12	2	554	632	-78	28
9	Sydney Roosters	24	11	0	13	2	488	487	+1	26
10	Penrith Panthers	24	11	0	13	2	554	554	0	26
11	New Zealand Warriors	24	10	0	14	2	515	528	-13	24
12	Canterbury-Bankstown Bulldogs	24	9	1	14	2	472	670	-198	23
13	South Sydney Rabbitohs	24	9	1	14	2	482	700	-218	23
14	Canberra Raiders	24	9	0	15	2	465	606	-141	22
15	Newcastle Knights	24	8	0	16	2	467	667	-200	20

== Player statistics ==
Player	Appearances	Tries	Goals	Field Goals	Total Points
Roy Bell	5	3	1	0	14
Beau Champion	8	0	3	0	6
Peter Cusack	24	2	0	0	8
Chris Enahoro	1	0	0	0	0
David Fa'alogo	24	3	0	0	12
Bryan Fletcher	14	4	0	0	16
Scott Geddes	18	1	0	0	4
Yileen Gordon	10	2	0	0	8
Glenn Hall	3	0	0	0	0
Ashley Harrison	21	10	0	0	40
Shannon Hegarty	22	4	0	0	16
Lee Hookey	11	3	0	0	12
Brett Kearney	3	0	0	0	0
Scott Logan	20	1	0	0	4
Shannan Mcpherson	2	0	0	0	0
Adam Macdougall	17	2	0	0	8
Luke Macdougall	16	11	0	0	44
Manase Manuokafoa	15	2	0	0	8
Shane Marteene	3	1	0	0	4
Mark Minichiello	24	5	0	0	20
Mick Moran	11	2	0	0	8
Todd Polglase	18	8	0	0	32
Shane Rigon	13	2	0	0	8
Luke Stuart	22	1	0	0	4
John Sutton	19	5	7	1	35
Peter Taylor	1	0	0	0	0
Ben Walker	9	3	24	3	63
Shane Walker	18	1	0	0	4
Brad Watts	13	5	12	0	44
Joe Williams	8	0	23	2	48
Garth Wood	7	2	0	0	8
Trent Young	8	1	0	0	4
	Totals	84	70	6	482

== Representative honours ==
Player	All Stars	ANZAC Test	Pacific Test	City / Country	State of Origin 1	State of Origin 2	State of Origin 3	Four Nations
Ashley Harrison	0	0	0	0	0	0	1	0
