= 2005 NRL season results =

The 2005 National Rugby League season consisted of 25 weekly regular season rounds starting in March, followed by four weeks of play-offs that culminated in a grand final on 2 October.

== Regular season ==
=== Round 1 ===
Home	Score	Away	Match Information
Home	Score	Away	Date and Time (Local)	Venue	Referees	Attendance
Canterbury Bulldogs	46–28	St. George Illawarra Dragons	11 March 2005, 7:30pm	Telstra Stadium	Paul Simpkins	33,105
Wests Tigers	12–28	Parramatta Eels	12 March 2005, 5:30pm	Telstra Stadium	Russell Smith	17,107
Cronulla Sharks	20–14	Penrith Panthers	12 March 2005, 7:30pm	Toyota Stadium	Shayne Hayne; Jason Robinson	19,562
Sydney Roosters	24–12	South Sydney Rabbitohs	12 March 2005, 7:30pm	Sydney Football Stadium	Tony Archer	22,186
New Zealand Warriors	20–26	Manly Sea Eagles	13 March 2005, 2:00pm	Ericsson Stadium	Sean Hampstead	13,682
Melbourne Storm	48–10	Newcastle Knights	13 March 2005, 2:30pm	Olympic Park Stadium	Steve Clark	10,484
Brisbane Broncos	29–16	North Queensland Cowboys	13 March 2005, 3:00pm	Suncorp Stadium	Tim Mander	43,488
Bye: Canberra Raiders

=== Round 2 ===
Home	Score	Away	Match Information
Home	Score	Away	Date and Time (Local)	Venue	Referees	Attendance
North Queensland Cowboys	24–12	Canterbury Bulldogs	18 March 2005, 7:30pm	Dairy Farmers Stadium	Steve Clark	21,138
Canberra Raiders	39–14	Newcastle Knights	19 March 2005, 5:30pm	Canberra Stadium	Jason Robinson	11,835
Brisbane Broncos	12–24	New Zealand Warriors	19 March 2005, 7:30pm	Suncorp Stadium	Russell Smith	24,719
St George Illawarra Dragons	12–46	Melbourne Storm	19 March 2005, 7:30pm	WIN Stadium	Tony Archer; Gavin Badger	9,032
South Sydney Rabbitohs	49–26	Parramatta Eels	20 March 2005, 2:30pm	Sydney Football Stadium	Sean Hampstead	11,445
Manly Sea Eagles	46–20	Cronulla Sharks	20 March 2005, 3:00pm	Brookvale Oval	Paul Simpkins	14,031
Penrith Panthers	20–28	Sydney Roosters	20 March 2005, 3:00pm	Penrith Park	Tim Mander	18,228
Bye: Wests Tigers

=== Round 3 ===
Home	Score	Away	Match Information
Home	Score	Away	Date and Time (Local)	Venue	Referees	Attendance
Sydney Roosters	22–40	Brisbane Broncos	25 March 2005, 7:30pm	Sydney Football Stadium	Tim Mander	23,157
Penrith Panthers	18–8	St George Illawarra Dragons	26 March 2005, 5:30pm	Penrith Park	Russell Smith	17,187
Parramatta Eels	10–18	Cronulla Sharks	26 March 2005, 7:30pm	Parramatta Stadium	Sean Hampstead	12,103
New Zealand Warriors	22–32	North Queensland Cowboys	27 March 2005, 2:00pm	Ericsson Stadium	Tony Archer	13,888
Manly Sea Eagles	25–18	Melbourne Storm	27 March 2005, 2:30pm	Brookvale Oval	Steve Clark	15,470
Canterbury Bulldogs	36–37	Wests Tigers	27 March 2005, 3:00pm	Telstra Stadium	Paul Simpkins	19,984
South Sydney Rabbitohs	18–25	Canberra Raiders	28 March 2005, 3:00pm	Sydney Football Stadium	Jason Robinson	14,455
Bye: Newcastle Knights

=== Round 4 ===
Home	Score	Away	Match Information
Home	Score	Away	Date and Time (Local)	Venue	Referees	Attendance
Parramatta Eels	26–16	Penrith Panthers	1 April 2005, 7:30pm	Parramatta Stadium	Paul Simpkins	15,119
Melbourne Storm	50–4	Brisbane Broncos	2 April 2005, 5:30pm	Olympic Park Stadium	Sean Hampstead	12,194
Canberra Raiders	42–22	St George Illawarra Dragons	2 April 2005, 7:30pm	Canberra Stadium	Tim Mander	15,614
North Queensland Cowboys	52–18	Newcastle Knights	2 April 2005, 7:30pm	Dairy Farmers Stadium	Jason Robinson	22,347
New Zealand Warriors	46–14	South Sydney Rabbitohs	3 April 2005, 2:00 pm	Ericsson Stadium	Russell Smith	9,751
Cronulla Sharks	26–12	Canterbury Bulldogs	3 April 2005, 2:30 pm	Toyota Stadium	Tony Archer	17,053
Sydney Roosters	26–32	Wests Tigers	3 April 2005, 3:00 pm	Sydney Football Stadium	Steve Clark	13,946
Bye: Manly Sea Eagles

=== Round 5 ===
Home	Score	Away	Match Information
Home	Score	Away	Date and Time (Local)	Venue	Referees	Attendance
Penrith Panthers	36–16	Melbourne Storm	8 April 2005, 7:30 pm	Penrith Park	Steve Clark	14,844
Wests Tigers	24–6	New Zealand Warriors	9 April 2005, 5:30 pm	Jade Stadium	Jason Robinson	18,421
Cronulla Sharks	38–6	North Queensland Cowboys	9 April 2005, 7:30 pm	Toyota Park	Tim Mander	17,323
St George Illawarra Dragons	32–6	Manly Sea Eagles	9 April 2005, 7:30 pm	Win Stadium	Sean Hampstead	16,117
Brisbane Broncos	54–14	Parramatta Eels	10 April 2005, 2:30 pm	Suncorp Stadium	Tony Archer; Shayne Hayne	25,843
Canberra Raiders	24–16	Sydney Roosters	10 April 2005, 3:00 pm	Canberra Stadium	Russell Smith	19,130
South Sydney Rabbitohs	37–12	Newcastle Knights	10 April 2005, 3:00 pm	Central Coast Stadium	Paul Simpkins	16,162
Bye: Canterbury Bulldogs

=== Round 6 ===
Home	Score	Away	Match Information
Home	Score	Away	Date and Time (Local)	Venue	Referees	Attendance
Canterbury Bulldogs	16–29	Sydney Roosters	15 April 2005, 7:30 pm	Telstra Stadium	Paul Simpkins	27,111
South Sydney Rabbitohs	6–36	Penrith Panthers	16 April 2005, 5:30 pm	Sydney Football Stadium	Tony Archer	11,108
Melbourne Storm	14–26	Parramatta Eels	16 April 2005, 7:30 pm	Olympic Park	Tim Mander	9,649
North Queensland Cowboys	44–20	Wests Tigers	16 April 2005, 7:30 pm	Dairy Farmers Stadium	Sean Hampstead	20,361
Manly-Warringah Sea Eagles	36–14	Canberra Raiders	17 April 2005, 2:30 pm	Brookvale Oval	Jason Robinson	17,061
Newcastle Knights	26–30	New Zealand Warriors	17 April 2005, 2:30 pm	Energy Australia Stadium	Russell Smith	18,173
St George Illawarra Dragons	24–34	Brisbane Broncos	17 April 2005, 3:00 pm	WIN Stadium	Steve Clark	17,287
Bye: Cronulla Sharks

== Finals series ==
The National Rugby League's 2005 finals series ran from 9 September to 2 October 2005, as eight teams vied to win the NRL Premiership in the Grand Final after the 2005 season. The final placings and first-week match-ups were decided only after all the matches in the final week were completed. The Grand Final, played on 2 October, was won by the Wests Tigers who claimed their first-ever NRL premiership. The runners up were the North Queensland Cowboys.

=== The Finals System ===
The system used for the NRL is the McIntyre final eight system, which is designed by Ken McIntyre in addition to the McIntyre Four, Five and Six systems to determine which two teams will play for the Premiership. In each of the three weeks of the competition, two teams are eliminated until only two teams are left. The better a team finishes in the home-and-away season ladder, the easier their route through to the grand final.

In the first week, twos are paired off as such by rank (games are played at the home ground of the higher seed):

- Team 4 vs. Team 5 (4th qualifying final)
- Team 3 vs. Team 6 (3rd qualifying final)
- Team 2 vs. Team 7 (2nd qualifying final)
- Team 1 vs. Team 8 (1st qualifying final)

Once all four games ave been played, teams are grouped into winners and losers, and then ranked based on their home-and-away season standings, for example:

Rank	Winners	Losers
1	Team 1	Team 2
2	Team 3	Team 5
3	Team 4	Team 6
4	Team 7	Team 8

...Losers #3 and #4 are immediately eliminated, while Winners #3 and #4 will face Losers #1 and #2 (in other words, a "double chance" for the two highest-ranked losers). Winners #1 and #2 receive a bye to week three, to await the winners of the two semi-finals.

The winners of the two preliminary finals will then face off for the premiership in the grand final.

=== Week One ===
==== Fourth Qualifying Final ====
Team	1st Half	2nd Half	Total
(4) Wests Tigers	14	36	50
(5) Nth QLD	6	0	6

Date	Friday, 9 September 2005 8 pm AEST
Tries (Wests)	3: B Hodgson; 1: D Fitzhenry, L Fulton, P Richards, P Whatuira, S Elford
Tries (NQLD)	1: M Sing
Goals (Wests)	9: B Hodgson
Goals (NQLD)	1: J Hannay
Injuries	None
Reports	None
Venue	Telstra Stadium, Sydney
Attendance	26,463
Referee	Paul Simpkins

==== Third Qualifying Final ====
Team	1st Half	2nd Half	Total
(3) Brisbane	4	14	18
(6) Melbourne	18	6	24

Date	Saturday, 10 September 2005 6:30 pm AEST
Tries (Bris)	1: D Smith, S Minto, B Seymour
Tries (Melb)	1: B Slater, G Inglis, J Webster, M King
Goals (Bris)	3: B Seymour
Goals (Melb)	2: M Orford, C Smith
Injuries	Melb: Kearns (dislocated shoulder), Slater (ankle)
Reports	None
Venue	Suncorp Stadium, Brisbane
Attendance	25,193
Referee	Steve Clark
This was the second successive year the Broncos and the Storm have met at this stage, with Melbourne winning 31–14 in 2004. In what looked to be a case of déjà vu, the Storm won this match 24–18. In 2006, they would meet again in a final, but this time in a Grand Final, the Broncos winning 15–8.

==== Second Qualifying Final ====
Team	1st Half	2nd Half	Total
(2) St George Illawarra	4	24	28
(7) Cronulla	12	10	22

Date	Saturday, 10 September 2005 8:30 pm AEST
Tries (StGI)	2: C Best; 1: D Young, T Barrett, W Naiqama
Tries (Cro)	1: B Scott, D Simmons, N Vagana, P Gallen
Goals (StGI)	4: M Ennis
Goals (Cro)	3: L Covell
Injuries	None
Reports	None
Venue	WIN Stadium, Wollongong
Attendance	19,608
Referee	Tony Archer

==== First Qualifying Final ====
Team	1st Half	2nd Half	Total
(1) Parramatta	28	18	46
(8) Manly	0	22	22

Date	Sunday, 11 September 2005 4 pm AEST
Tries (Par)	2: T Tahu; 1: C Robinson, M Riddell, E Grothe, L Burt, D Wagon, A Peek
Tries (Man)	2: B Kennedy; 1: A Watmough, M Witt
Goals (Par)	7: L Burt
Goals (Man)	2: L Williamson; 1: M Monaghan
Injuries	None
Reports	None
Venue	Parramatta Stadium, Sydney
Attendance	19,710
Referee	Tim Mander

=== Week Two ===
==== First Semi-final ====
Team	1st Half	2nd Half	Total
(6) Melbourne	0	16	16
(5) Nth QLD	16	8	24

Date	Saturday, 17 September 2005 7:45 pm AEST
Tries (Melb)	1: S Bell, M King, M Orford
Tries (NQLD)	2: T Williams; 1: M Bowen, D Faiumu
Goals (Melb)	1: C Smith, M Orford
Goals (NQLD)	2: J Thurston, J Hannay
Injuries	None
Reports	None
Venue	Sydney Football Stadium, Sydney
Attendance	16,810
Referee	Paul Simpkins

==== Second Semi-final ====
Team	1st Half	2nd Half	Total
(4) Wests Tigers	10	24	34
(3) Brisbane	0	6	6

Date	Sunday, 18 September 2005 4 pm AEST
Tries (Wests)	2: D Fitzhenry; 1: B Hodgson, M. O'Neill, B Marshall, S Prince
Tries (Bris)	1: D Lockyer
Goals (Wests)	5: B Hodgson
Goals (Bris)	1: B Seymour
Injuries	None
Reports	None
Venue	Sydney Football Stadium, Sydney
Attendance	36,563
Referee	Tim Mander

=== Week Three ===
==== First Preliminary Final ====
Team	1st Half	2nd Half	Total
(2) St George Illawarra	6	6	12
(4) Wests Tigers	16	4	20

Date	Saturday, 24 September 2005 7;45pm AEST
Tries (StG)	1: W Naiqama, T Barrett
Tries (WES)	2: D Halatau; 1: C Heighington, B Marshall
Goals (StG)	2: M Ennis
Goals (WES)	2: B Hodgson
F.Goals (StG)	None
F.Goals (WES)	None
Injuries	Pat Richards (Ankle)
Reports	None
Venue	Sydney Football Stadium, Sydney
Attendance	41,260
Referee	Tim Mander

==== Second Preliminary Final ====
Team	1st Half	2nd Half	Total
(1) Parramatta	0	0	0
(5) Nth QLD	18	11	29

Date	Sunday, 25 September 2005 4 pm AEST
Tries (Par)	None
Tries (NQLD)	1: M Bowen, R Jensen, B Firman, T Williams, J Hannay
Goals (Par)	None
Goals (NQLD)	4: J Hannay
F.Goals (Par)	None
F.Goals (NQLD)	1: J Thurston
Injuries	Par: T Smith (head); NQLD: Norton (back)
Reports	NQLD: O'Donnell for high shot on T Smith
Venue	Telstra Stadium, Sydney, NSW
Attendance	44,327
Referee	Steve Clark
Brett Firman scores in the 2005 Preliminary Final

== 2005 NRL Grand Final ==
Team	1st Half	2nd Half	Total
(4) Wests Tigers	12	18	30
(5) North Queensland Cowboys	6	10	16

Date	Sunday, 2 October 2005 7 pm AEST
Tries (Wests Tigers)	1: Bryce Gibbs, Pat Richards, Anthony Laffranchi, Daniel Fitzhenry, Todd Payten
Tries (North Queensland Cowboys)	1: Matt Bowen, Travis Norton, Matt Sing
Goals (Wests Tigers)	5/6: Brett Hodgson
Goals (North Queensland Cowboys)	2/3: Josh Hannay
Field Goals (Wests Tigers)	None
Field Goals (North Queensland Cowboys)	None
Injuries	None
Reports	None
Churchill Medal	Scott Prince (Wests Tigers)
Venue	Telstra Stadium, Sydney, New South Wales
Attendance	82,453
Referee	Tim Mander
