= 2005 New Zealand Warriors season =

- NRL rank: 11th
- 2005 record: Wins: 10; draws: 0; losses: 14
- Points scored: For: 515; against: 528

Team information
- CEO: Mick Watson
- Coach: Tony Kemp
- Assistant coach: Ivan Cleary; Kevin Campion
- Captains: Steve Price; Stacey Jones (7) Monty Betham (1)
- Stadium: Ericsson Stadium
- Avg. attendance: 13,101

Top scorers
- Tries: Todd Byrne (14)
- Goals: Stacey Jones (63)
- Points: Stacey Jones (147)
← 2004	2006 →

The 2005 New Zealand Warriors season was the 11th in the club's history. The club competed in Australasia's National Rugby League. The coach of the team was Tony Kemp while Steve Price was the club captain.

== Milestones ==
- 3 April - Round 4: Clinton Toopi played in his 100th match for the club.
- 9 April - Round 5: Francis Meli plays in his 100th first grade match for the club.
- 7 May - Round 9: Wairangi Koopu played in his 100th match for the club.
- 13 August - Round 23: Monty Betham played in his 100th first grade match for the club and Karl Temata played in his 50th game for the club.

== Jersey and sponsors ==

The Warriors again made no changes to their jersey design for the 2005 season. During Round Sixteen a replica 1995 jersey was worn against the Brisbane Broncos to mark the 10th season of the Warriors.

== Fixtures ==
The Warriors used Ericsson Stadium as their home ground in 2005, their only home ground since they entered the competition in 1995.

=== Pre-season ===
The Warriors played a match against the NZRL's Presidents selection at North Harbour Stadium on 27 February. The President's selection was coached by John Ackland and Tawera Nikau and included: Toshio Laiseni, Cooper Vuna, Simon Mannering, Joshua Davis, Rowan Baxter, Daniel Vasau, Bernard Perenara, George Tuakura, Ben Lythe, Phil Shead, Odell Manuel, Chris Newton, Wayne McDade. Interchange: Paul Atkins, Andreas Bauer, Marvin Filipo, Robinson Godfrey, Pinomi Tafea, Willie Live, Artie Shead, Sam Rapira, Chris Tupou, Dean Shepherd, Antonio Tusani. For the Warriors, the match was Nathan Fien's first for the club. The Warriors won the game 58–6.

Date	Opponent	Venue	Result	Score	Tries	Goals	Attendance	Report
13 February	Parramatta Eels	Yarrow Stadium, New Plymouth	Win	20-10			9,500	
27 February	NZRL's Presidents selection	North Harbour Stadium, Auckland	Win	58-6	Meli (3), Webb (3), Hohaia (2), Ropati, Martin, Latu	Jones (5)		

=== Regular season ===
Date	Round	Opponent	Venue	Result	Score	Tries	Goals	Attendance	Report
13 March	Round 1	Manly Sea Eagles	Ericsson Stadium, Auckland	Lost	20-26	Anderson, Koopu, Toopi	Jones (4)	13,682	
19 March	Round 2	Brisbane Broncos	Suncorp Stadium, Brisbane	Win	24-12	Jones, Ropati, Wiki	Jones (6)	24,719	
27 March	Round 3	North Queensland Cowboys	Ericsson Stadium, Auckland	Lost	22-32	Betham, Byrne, Fien, Paleaaesina	Jones (3)	13,888	
3 April	Round 4	South Sydney Rabbitohs	Ericsson Stadium, Auckland	Win	46-14	Betham, Byrne, Fien, Guttenbeil, Jones, Koopu, Toopi, Manu Vatuvei	Jones (7)	9,751	
9 April	Round 5	Wests Tigers	AMI Stadium, Christchurch	Lost	6-24	Byrne	Jones (1)	18,421	
17 April	Round 6	Newcastle Knights	EnergyAustralia Stadium, Newcastle	Win	30-26	Vatuvei (2), Byrne, Faumuina, Meli, Toopi	Jones (3)	18,173	
	Round 7	Bye							
1 May	Round 8	Penrith Panthers	Ericsson Stadium, Auckland	Lost	14-16	Byrne, Temata, Vatuvei	Jones (1)	10,989	
7 May	Round 9	Cronulla Sharks	Members Equity Stadium, Perth	Lost	24-28	Byrne, Hohaia, Koopu, Villasanti	Hohaia (4)	13,293	
15 May	Round 10	Sydney Roosters	Ericsson Stadium, Auckland	Lost	6-10	Byrne	Hohaia (1)	10,082	
21 May	Round 11	South Sydney Rabbitohs	North Sydney Oval, Sydney	Win	34-16	Faumuina, Meli, Ropati, Vatuvei, Villasanti, Webb	Jones (3), Hohaia (2)	6,195	
29 May	Round 12	Wests Tigers	Ericsson Stadium, Auckland	Win	21-4	Toopi (2), Byrne, Villasanti	Jones (1 & FG), Hohaia (1)	9,420	
4 June	Round 13	St. George Illawarra Dragons	WIN Stadium, Wollongong	Lost	18-32	Byrne, Paleaaesina, Vatuvei	Jones (3)	14,479	
12 June	Round 14	Melbourne Storm	Ericsson Stadium, Auckland	Win	24-16	Byrne (2), Meli, Paleaaesina, Ropati	Jones (2)	7,898	
18 June	Round 15	Parramatta Eels	Waikato Stadium, Hamilton	Lost	18-28	Byrne, Meli, Toopi, Villasanti	Hohaia (1)	17,142	
26 June	Round 16	Brisbane Broncos	Ericsson Stadium, Auckland	Win	30-18	Koopu (2), Faumuina, Hohaia, Meli, Vatuvei	Jones (3)	13,752	
2 July	Round 17	North Queensland Cowboys	Dairy Farmers Stadium, Townsville	Lost	16-24	Koopu, Vatuvei, Wiki	Jones (2)	20,078	
10 July	Round 18	Canterbury Bulldogs	Ericsson Stadium, Auckland	Lost	24-26	Meli, Byrne, Koopu, Jones	Jones (4)	12,822	
16 July	Round 19	Sydney Roosters	Sydney Football Stadium, Sydney	Win	24-22	Hohaia (2), Webb, Wiki	Jones (4)	13,789	
23 July	Round 20	Canberra Raiders	Ericsson Stadium, Auckland	Win	24-16	Fien, Hohaia, Meli, Ropati	Jones (4)	18,361	
30 July	Round 21	Penrith Panthers	CUA Stadium, Sydney	Lost	34-42	Byrne, Faumuina, Fien, Guttenbeil, Jones, Webb	Jones (5)	13,985	
6 August	Round 22	Parramatta Eels	Ericsson Stadium, Auckland	Lost	20-38	Fien (2), Koopu	Jones (4)	19,211	
13 August	Round 23	Melbourne Storm	Olympic Park Stadium, Melbourne	Lost	10-22	Fien, Meli	Jones (1)	11,072	
20 August	Round 24	Newcastle Knights	Ericsson Stadium, Auckland	Lost	4-16	Vatuvei		17,356	
27 August	Round 25	Manly Sea Eagles	Brookvale Oval, Sydney	Win	22-20	Faumuina, Jones, Koopu, Wiki	Jones (3)	14,219	
	Round 26	Bye							

== Ladder ==
2005 NRL season
Pos	Team	Pld	W	D	L	B	PF	PA	PD	Pts
1	Parramatta Eels	24	16	0	8	2	704	456	+248	36
2	St George Illawarra Dragons	24	16	0	8	2	655	510	+145	36
3	Brisbane Broncos	24	15	0	9	2	597	484	+113	34
4	Wests Tigers (P)	24	14	0	10	2	676	575	+101	32
5	North Queensland Cowboys	24	14	0	10	2	639	563	+76	32
6	Melbourne Storm	24	13	0	11	2	640	462	+178	30
7	Cronulla-Sutherland Sharks	24	12	0	12	2	550	564	-14	28
8	Manly-Warringah Sea Eagles	24	12	0	12	2	554	632	-78	28
9	Sydney Roosters	24	11	0	13	2	488	487	+1	26
10	Penrith Panthers	24	11	0	13	2	554	554	0	26
11	New Zealand Warriors	24	10	0	14	2	515	528	-13	24
12	Canterbury-Bankstown Bulldogs	24	9	1	14	2	472	670	-198	23
13	South Sydney Rabbitohs	24	9	1	14	2	482	700	-218	23
14	Canberra Raiders	24	9	0	15	2	465	606	-141	22
15	Newcastle Knights	24	8	0	16	2	467	667	-200	20

== Squad ==
Twenty Four players were used by the Warriors in 2005, including several players who made their first grade debuts.

No.	Name	Nationality	Position	Warriors debut	App	T	G	FG	Pts
24	Stacey Jones	(New Zealand)	HB	23 April 1995	23	5	63	1	147
33	Awen Guttenbeil	(New Zealand)	SR	14 April 1996	23	2	0	0	8
61	Monty Betham	(New Zealand)	HK / LK	8 March 1999	16	2	0	0	8
64	Wairangi Koopu	(New Zealand)	CE / SR	9 April 1999	24	9	0	0	36
65	Francis Meli	(New Zealand)	WG	2 May 1999	21	8	0	0	32
66	Clinton Toopi	(New Zealand)	CE	2 May 1999	23	6	0	0	24
87	Richard Villasanti	(Australia)	PR	18 February 2001	19	4	0	0	16
93	Iafeta Paleaaesina	(New Zealand)	PR	1 June 2001	22	3	0	0	12
97	Brent Webb	(New Zealand)	FB	1 April 2002	20	3	0	0	12
98	Sione Faumuina	(New Zealand)	CE / LK	1 April 2002	20	5	0	0	20
99	Lance Hohaia	(New Zealand)	UB	6 April 2002	19	5	10	0	40
102	Evarn Tuimavave	(New Zealand)	PR	1 September 2002	2	0	0	0	0
103	Karl Temata	(Cook Islands)	PR / SR	6 September 2002	20	1	0	0	4
107	Tevita Latu	(New Zealand)	HK	7 June 2003	8	0	0	0	0
108	Jerome Ropati	(New Zealand)	CE / FE	31 August 2003	23	4	0	0	16
109	Tony Martin	(Australia)	CE	14 March 2004	2	0	0	0	0
110	Epalahame Lauaki	(New Zealand)	SR	14 March 2004	5	0	0	0	0
112	Louis Anderson	(New Zealand)	LK	28 March 2004	18	1	0	0	4
115	Manu Vatuvei	(New Zealand)	WG	23 May 2004	12	9	0	0	36
118	Cooper Vuna	(New Zealand)	WG	21 August 2004	0	0	0	0	0
121	Steve Price	(Australia)	PR	13 March 2005	16	0	0	0	0
122	Todd Byrne	(Australia)	WG	13 March 2005	22	14	0	0	56
123	Ruben Wiki	(New Zealand)	PR	13 March 2005	19	4	0	0	16
124	Nathan Fien	(New Zealand)	HK	13 March 2005	22	7	0	0	28
125	Simon Mannering	(New Zealand)	CE	26 June 2005	7	0	0	0	0

== Staff ==
- Chief Executive Officer: Mick Watson

=== Coaching staff ===
- Head coach: Tony Kemp
- Assistant coach: Ivan Cleary
- Assistant coach: Kevin Campion
- IT and Video Analyst: Tony Iro
- Trainer: Craig Walker

== Transfers ==
=== Gains ===
Player	Previous club	Length	Notes
Steve Price	Canterbury Bulldogs		
Todd Byrne	Sydney Roosters		
Ruben Wiki	Canberra Raiders		
Nathan Fien	North Queensland Cowboys		

=== Losses ===
Player	Club	Notes
Paul Atkins	Otahuhu-Ellerslie Leopards	
Kane Ferris	Canterbury Bulls	
Herewini Rangi	Central Comets	
Shannon Stowers	Mount Albert Lions	
Paul Dezolt	Queensland Cup	Released 14 June 2004
Matt Jobson	Wests Tigers	
Danny Sullivan	Retired	
Vince Mellars	Cronulla Sharks	
Thomas Leuluai	London Broncos	
Vinnie Anderson	St Helens R.F.C.	
PJ Marsh	Parramatta Eels	
Justin Murphy	Widnes Vikings	Released July 2004
Henry Fa'afili	Warrington Wolves	
Mark Tookey	Castleford Tigers	Released June 2004
Ali Lauitiiti	Leeds Rhinos	Released April 2004
Jerry Seuseu	Wigan Warriors	

== Other teams ==
Players not required by the Warriors were released to play in the 2005 Bartercard Cup. This included Cooper Vuna who played for the Otahuhu-Ellerslie Leopards.

== Awards ==
Ruben Wiki won the Player of the Year award.
