= 2005 Brisbane Broncos season =

Coordinates: 27°27′53″S 153°0′34″E

← 2004	2006 →

The 2005 Brisbane Broncos season was the eighteenth in the club's history, and they competed in the NRL's 2005 Telstra Premiership. Coached by Wayne Bennett and captained by Darren Lockyer, they finished the regular season 3rd (out of 15) despite ending the year with another long losing streak which continued into the play-offs and saw them knocked out once again.

== Season summary ==
With Gorden Tallis' retirement at the end of the previous season, the Broncos' captaincy was passed onto star fullback-turned-5/8th Darren Lockyer. In round 1 of NRL season 2005 Lockyer led the Broncos out for the first time and won 29-16 against the North Queensland Cowboys, the team that knocked them out of the finals in their last match the previous year. Three weeks later, the Broncos suffered their worst defeat in the club's history with a 50-4 loss to the Melbourne Storm at Olympic Park. After this match, the Broncos won their next ten matches straight from round 5 to round 17 to lead the competition, only to lose their last five regular season game in a row from round 22 to round 26, finishing third heading into the finals. The losing streak extended into the finals with defeats in the Qualifying Final to the Melbourne Storm 24-18 and in the Semi Final to the Wests Tigers 34-6, sending them out of the competition and making it seven consecutive losses in and seven straight finals losses for the Broncos.

At the end of the 2005 season, after five successive years without a grand final appearance, Bennett decided to have a cleanout of the coaching staff, removing such long-time allies as Gary Belcher, Glenn Lazarus and Kevin Walters.

== Match results ==
Round	Opponent	Result	Bro.	Opp.	Date	Venue	Crowd	Position
Trial Match	Melbourne Storm	Loss	10	24	19 Feb	Carrara Stadium	-	-
Trial Match	Canberra Raiders	Win	26	20	26 Feb	Stadium Toowoomba	-	-
1	North Queensland Cowboys	Win	29	16	13 Mar	Suncorp Stadium	43,488	4/15
2	New Zealand Warriors	Loss	12	24	19 Mar	Suncorp Stadium	24,719	8/15
3	Sydney Roosters	Win	40	22	25 Mar	Sydney Football Stadium	23,157	4/15
4	Melbourne Storm	Loss	4	50	2 Apr	Olympic Park	12,149	10/15
5	Parramatta Eels	Win	54	14	10 Apr	Suncorp Stadium	25,843	6/15
6	St George Illawarra Dragons	Win	34	24	17 Apr	WIN Stadium	17,287	5/15
7	Cronulla Sharks	Win	16	12	23 Apr	Toyota Park	17,864	4/15
8	Manly Sea Eagles	Win	38	12	29 Apr	Suncorp Stadium	27,514	2/15
9	Canterbury Bulldogs	Win	35	28	8 May	Suncorp Stadium	29,845	1/15
10	North Queensland Cowboys	Win	23	6	14 May	Dairy Farmers Stadium	22,477	1/15
11	Bye	-	-	-	-	-	-	1/15
12*	South Sydney Rabbitohs	Win	36	12	28 May	Suncorp Stadium	18,081	1/15
13	Newcastle Knights	Win	34	16	5 Jun	EnergyAustralia Stadium	22,423	1/15
14	Canberra Raiders	Win	20	12	11 Jun	Canberra Stadium	8,609	1/15
15*	Wests Tigers	Win	40	22	18 Jun	Suncorp Stadium	25,780	1/15
16	New Zealand Warriors	Loss	18	30	26 Jun	Ericsson Stadium	13,752	1/15
17	Cronulla Sharks	Win	22	10	3 Jul	Suncorp Stadium	23,900	1/15
18	Bye	-	-	-	-	-	-	1/15
19*	Melbourne Storm	Win	28	15	17 Jul	Suncorp Stadium	32,738	1/15
20	Canterbury Bulldogs	Loss	22	29	22 Jul	Telstra Stadium	29,112	1/15
21	Canberra Raiders	Win	24	18	30 Jul	Suncorp Stadium	27,478	1/15
22	Manly Sea Eagles	Loss	20	21	7 Aug	Brookvale Oval	29,112	1/15
23	St George Illawarra Dragons	Loss	4	24	14 Aug	Suncorp Stadium	27,478	1/15
24	Penrith Panthers	Loss	20	22	21 Aug	CUA Stadium	16,198	1/15
25	Sydney Roosters	Loss	10	17	26 Aug	Suncorp Stadium	48,995	3/15
26	Parramatta Eels	Loss	14	28	2 Sep	Parramatta Stadium	20,340	3/15
Qualif. Final	Melbourne Storm	Loss	18	24	10 Sep	Suncorp Stadium	25,193	-
Semi Final	Wests Tigers	Loss	6	34	18 Sep	Sydney Football Stadium	36,563	-

*Game following a State of Origin match

== Season Ladder ==
2005 NRL season
Pos	Team	Pld	W	D	L	B	PF	PA	PD	Pts
1	Parramatta Eels	24	16	0	8	2	704	456	+248	36
2	St George Illawarra Dragons	24	16	0	8	2	655	510	+145	36
3	Brisbane Broncos	24	15	0	9	2	597	484	+113	34
4	Wests Tigers (P)	24	14	0	10	2	676	575	+101	32
5	North Queensland Cowboys	24	14	0	10	2	639	563	+76	32
6	Melbourne Storm	24	13	0	11	2	640	462	+178	30
7	Cronulla-Sutherland Sharks	24	12	0	12	2	550	564	-14	28
8	Manly-Warringah Sea Eagles	24	12	0	12	2	554	632	-78	28
9	Sydney Roosters	24	11	0	13	2	488	487	+1	26
10	Penrith Panthers	24	11	0	13	2	554	554	0	26
11	New Zealand Warriors	24	10	0	14	2	515	528	-13	24
12	Canterbury-Bankstown Bulldogs	24	9	1	14	2	472	670	-198	23
13	South Sydney Rabbitohs	24	9	1	14	2	482	700	-218	23
14	Canberra Raiders	24	9	0	15	2	465	606	-141	22
15	Newcastle Knights	24	8	0	16	2	467	667	-200	20

== Players ==
- Berrick Barnes
- Barry Berrigan
- Shaun Berrigan
- Leon Bott
- Dane Carlaw
- Tonie Carroll
- Petero Civoniceva
- Neville Costigan
- Nathan Daly
- Greg Eastwood
- Justin Hodges
- Karmichael Hunt
- Stuart Kelly
- Nick Kenny
- Tom Learoyd-Lars
- Darren Lockyer (c)
- Darren Mapp
- Casey McGuire
- Stephen Michaels
- Scott Minto
- Nick Parfitt
- Corey Parker
- Brett Seymour
- Darren Smith
- David Stagg
- Brent Tate
- Sam Thaiday
- Brad Thorn
- Tame Tupou
- Shane Webcke
- Neale Wyatt

== Scorers ==
Player	Tries	Goals	Field Goals	Points
Darren Lockyer	8	52/84	1	137
Brett Seymour	7	32/42	2	94
Shaun Berrigan	19	0	0	76
Leon Bott	13	0	0	52
Justin Hodges	11	0	0	44
Karmichael Hunt	8	0	0	32
Brent Tate	7	0	0	28
Scott Minto	7	0	0	28
David Stagg	5	0	0	20
Casey McGuire	4	0	0	16
Darren Smith	4	0	0	16
Brad Thorn	4	0	0	16
Tonie Carroll	3	0	0	12
Dane Carlaw	2	0	0	8
Petero Civoniceva	2	0	0	8
Barry Berrigan	2	0	0	8
Stephen Michaels	2	0	0	8
Corey Parker	1	1/1	0	6
Sam Thaiday	1	0	0	4
Neville Costigan	1	0	0	4
Berrick Barnes	1	0/2	0	4

== Honours ==
=== League ===
- Nil

=== Club ===
- Player of the year: Shane Webcke
- Rookie of the year: Leon Bott
- Back of the year: Justin Hodges
- Forward of the year: Petero Civoniceva
- Club man of the year: Tony Duggan
