= 2005 Cronulla-Sutherland Sharks season =

Cronulla-Sutherland Sharks seasons

- NRL rank: 7th
- 2005 record: Wins: 12; draws: 0; losses: 13
- Points scored: For: 572 (103 tries, 80 goals); against: 592 (102 tries, 92 goals)

Team information
- Coach: Stuart Raper
- Captain: David Peachey Brett Kimmorley
- Stadium: Toyota Park
- Avg. attendance: 16,281

Top scorers
- Tries: David Simmons (16)
- Goals: Luke Covell (75)
- Points: Luke Covell (186)
← 2004	2006 →

This article details the Cronulla-Sutherland Sharks rugby league football club's 2005 season.

== Season summary ==
The Sharks started season 2005 brightly; at one stage they were joint ladder leaders after round 11. Early season highlights included wins over the 2003 premiers Penrith in the opening round, Parramatta in round three at Parramatta Stadium, 2004 premiers the Bulldogs at home in round four, North Queensland in round five, the Melbourne Storm in Melbourne in round eight, the New Zealand Warriors in Perth in round nine, the Canberra Raiders at Canberra Stadium in round ten and again over the Penrith Panthers at Penrith in round eleven. However, the season would fall apart with losses to Parramatta at home (the Sharks trailed 22–0 at halftime before rallying in the second half to go down 34–26), North Queensland in Townsville, the eventual premiers Wests Tigers at Campbelltown in round 14 before winning against the Sydney Roosters at home in round fifteen. Three more wins followed; a thrilling 30-26 golden point win over the struggling but resurgent Newcastle Knights at home with Vince Mellars scoring the winning try, a 40-16 hammering of the Melbourne Storm at home in what was now-Dragons premiership player Beau Scott's debut match and a massive 68-6 annihilation of Manly in round 24. Late season losses to Souths, St. George Illawarra, the Wests Tigers, Sydney Roosters and the Newcastle Knights in Newcastle all proved costly. The Sharks finished seventh, equal with Manly but higher courtesy of the round 24 result, making the finals for the first time since 2002 but eliminated by the Dragons 28–22 in front of a massive Wollongong crowd in the first round.

The Sharks' round two loss to the Manly-Warringah Sea Eagles was marred by the sickening injury suffered by Keith Galloway as a result of a high elbow shot from Manly winger John Hopoate. Galloway missed a huge part of the 2005 season partly as a result from the injury and due to limited opportunities at Cronulla he signed with the Wests Tigers for the 2006 season onwards. For his part, Hopoate was sacked by the Sea Eagles after receiving a mammoth 17-week ban by the NRL Judiciary.

== Ladder ==
2005 NRL season
Pos	Team	Pld	W	D	L	B	PF	PA	PD	Pts
1	Parramatta Eels	24	16	0	8	2	704	456	+248	36
2	St George Illawarra Dragons	24	16	0	8	2	655	510	+145	36
3	Brisbane Broncos	24	15	0	9	2	597	484	+113	34
4	Wests Tigers (P)	24	14	0	10	2	676	575	+101	32
5	North Queensland Cowboys	24	14	0	10	2	639	563	+76	32
6	Melbourne Storm	24	13	0	11	2	640	462	+178	30
7	Cronulla-Sutherland Sharks	24	12	0	12	2	550	564	-14	28
8	Manly-Warringah Sea Eagles	24	12	0	12	2	554	632	-78	28
9	Sydney Roosters	24	11	0	13	2	488	487	+1	26
10	Penrith Panthers	24	11	0	13	2	554	554	0	26
11	New Zealand Warriors	24	10	0	14	2	515	528	-13	24
12	Canterbury-Bankstown Bulldogs	24	9	1	14	2	472	670	-198	23
13	South Sydney Rabbitohs	24	9	1	14	2	482	700	-218	23
14	Canberra Raiders	24	9	0	15	2	465	606	-141	22
15	Newcastle Knights	24	8	0	16	2	467	667	-200	20

== Awards ==
- Player of the year- Danny Nutley
- Chairman's Award - Paul Gallen
- Rookie of the Year - Phillip Leuluai
- Try of the Year - David Peachey
- Premier League Player of the Year - Nathan Merritt
- Jersey Flegg Player of the Year - Jacob Selmes
- Jersey Flegg Player's Player - Mitch Brown
