= Filinga Filiga =

New Zealand rugby league footballer

Personal information
- Born: 5 January 1985 (age 40); Auckland, New Zealand

Playing information
- Position: Centre, Wing
Club
Years	Team	Pld	T	G	FG	P
2005	Canterbury-Bankstown	2	0	0	0	0

Filinga Filiga (born 5 January 1985) is a New Zealand former professional rugby league footballer who played for the Bulldogs in the National Rugby League.

Filiga came to Canterbury via Auckland Marist and played in the final two rounds of the 2005 NRL season. Filiga often played as a centre in the Premier League for Canterbury, but was used on the wing in his first-grade appearances.

After leaving Canterbury, Filiga had stints with North Sydney and Cronulla's NSW Cup sides.

Filiga won a Queensland Cup premiership with Sunshine Coast in 2009.
