= Carl Webb =

Australian rugby league footballer (1981–2023)

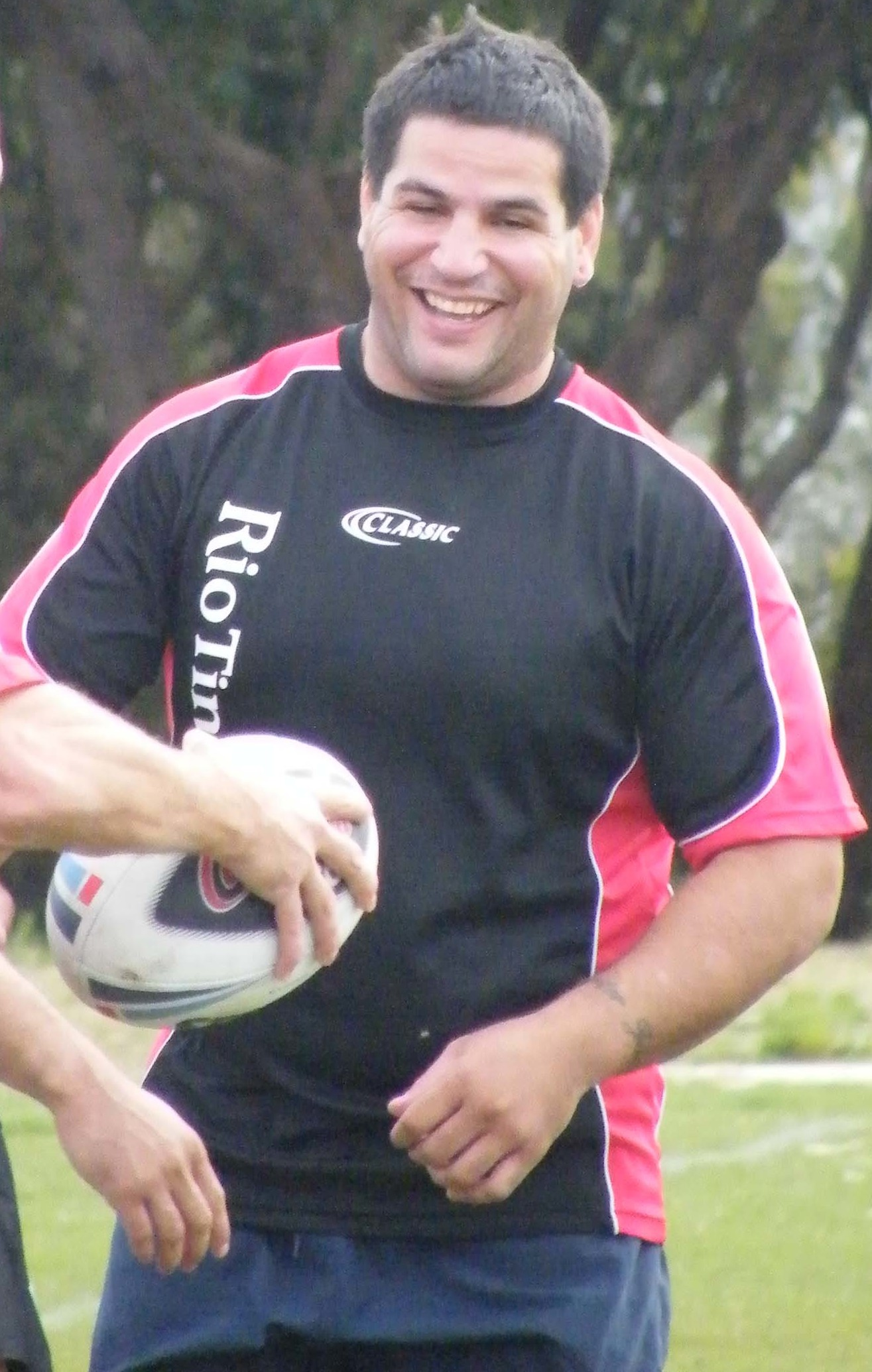

Personal information
- Full name: Carl William Webb
- Born: 20 March 1981 Mount Isa, Queensland, Australia
- Died: 21 December 2023 (aged 42) Dalby, Queensland, Australia

Playing information
- Height: 182 cm (6 ft 0 in)
- Weight: 108 kg (17 st 0 lb)
- Position: Prop, Second-row, Lock
Club
Years	Team	Pld	T	G	FG	P
2000–04	Brisbane Broncos	66	21	0	0	84
2005–10	North Qld Cowboys	115	16	0	0	64
2011	Parramatta Eels	6	0	0	0	0
	Total	187	37	0	0	148
Representative
Years	Team	Pld	T	G	FG	P
2001–08	Queensland	15	2	0	0	8
2008	Australia	1	0	0	0	0
2010–11	Indigenous All Stars	2	0	0	0	0

Carl Webb (20 March 1981 – 21 December 2023) was an Australian professional rugby league footballer who played as a prop, second-row and lock in the 2000s and 2010s.

Webb played for the Brisbane Broncos, North Queensland Cowboys and the Parramatta Eels in the NRL. Webb played for Queensland in the State of Origin series, Australia at international level and also the Indigenous All Stars side.

== Background ==
Carl Webb was born in Mount Isa, Queensland, Australia and was of Indigenous Australian and New Zealand Maori descent. Webb played for the Dalby Diehards in the Toowoomba Rugby League competition during the mid 1990's. As a teenager at 15 and 16 years of age, he would play in the Dalby first-grade side.

Webb played for the Toowoomba Clydesdales before joining the Brisbane Broncos.

== Professional playing career ==
=== Brisbane ===
After playing for the Toowoomba Clydesdales, Webb made his NRL debut for the Brisbane Broncos in 2000 against the North Queensland Cowboys. The next year he made his debut in State of Origin, representing Queensland, scoring one try. He won the 2001 Brisbane Broncos season's Rookie of the Year award but a combination of inconsistent form and injuries saw him in and out of first grade; he eventually joined the North Queensland Cowboys for the 2005 season.

=== North Queensland ===
Webb had a strong start to the 2005 NRL season, earning a position in the Queensland Maroons. Injury impeded his season and in the final round he was suspended for punching Melbourne Storm player Ryan Hoffman, which saw him sidelined from the Cowboys' 2005 finals series, at the end of which they suffered an upset loss to the Wests Tigers in the Grand Final. Webb was selected at second-row forward for Game II of the 2006 State of Origin series, scoring a try. In 2007, Webb again started the season strongly, but suffered a broken jaw early in the season. He returned to the field in round 8.

Webb playing for the Cowboys

In May 2008 Webb played in his debut test for the Australian national team against New Zealand. On 20 May 2008, Webb re-signed with the Cowboys until the end of the 2010 season, a contract rumoured to be worth around A$300,000 a year. He was named in the Australia training squad for the 2008 Rugby League World Cup, but was not selected to play. He played for the Prime Minister's XIII against Papua New Guinea in the post season and also appeared at the World Cup's opening night for the Indigenous Australian team in a match against the New Zealand Maori team.

Webb was selected to play at prop forward in the 2010 All Stars match for the Indigenous all Stars team. On 31 August 2010, Webb signed with the Parramatta Eels to play there for the 2011 and 2012 seasons, along with fellow NRL veterans Chris Walker, Chris Hicks, Casey McGuire and Paul Whatuira.

=== Parramatta ===
For the 2011 All Stars match Webb was selected for the interchange bench of the Indigenous All Stars team. On 9 August 2011 Webb announced his immediate retirement from the NRL, after playing only six games for the Eels.

== Personal life ==
=== Arrest ===
In 2015, Webb was arrested and charged with three counts of attempting to enter a dwelling with intent at night, threatening violence and one count of wilful damage after a late-night street rampage in Trinity Park, a suburb of Cairns. On 14 September 2015, Webb was sentenced to 18 months' probation, including an order for counselling. He was also ordered to pay a total of $2,417 for repair of damages to the homes and car. No conviction was recorded.

=== Boxing ===
Webb, who had been boxing for years, made his professional debut in January 2010 against heavyweight Scott Lewis on the Anthony Mundine versus Robert Medley undercard in Sydney. He lost the bout.

=== Illness and death ===
On 5 March 2020, it was revealed that Webb had been diagnosed with early-onset motor neurone disease. Webb started the Carl Webb Foundation in 2020 to raise awareness and funds for those suffering with MND.

Webb died on 21 December 2023 after a four-year illness. He was 42.

=== Legacy ===
The man of the match in matches between the Broncos and Cowboys is awarded the Carl Webb Medal.
