= Dallas McIlwain =

Australian rugby league footballer

Personal information
- Full name: Dallas McIlwain
- Born: 24 January 1982 (age 44) Inverell, New South Wales, Australia
- Height: 5 ft 11 in (1.80 m)
- Weight: 14 st 9 lb (205 lb; 93 kg) (93 Kg)

Playing information
- Position: Lock
Club
Years	Team	Pld	T	G	FG	P
2005–07	Canterbury-Bankstown	31	6	0	0	24
- Source: As of 17 January 2019

Dallas McIlwain (born 24 January 1982 ) is an Australian former professional rugby league footballer who played in the 2000s for Canterbury-Bankstown in the National Rugby League competition. McIlwain's position of choice was at lock-forward.

== Background ==
McIlwain was born in Inverell, New South Wales, Australia.

== Playing career ==
McIlwain made his first grade debut for Canterbury Bankstown Bulldogs in 2005 and played 2 seasons with the club, however during the 2007 season McIlwain suffered a back injury. The injury would eventually force him to leave Canterbury and return to Queensland. In 2008, McIlwain joined Wynnum-Manly in the QLD Cup competition.
