= Ben Reynolds (Australian rugby league) =

Australian rugby league footballer (born 1982)

Personal information
- Born: 7 January 1982 (age 43); Lithgow, New South Wales, Australia
- Height: 180 cm (5 ft 11 in)
- Weight: 91 kg (14 st 5 lb)

Playing information
- Position: Five-eighth, Halfback
Club
Years	Team	Pld	T	G	FG	P
2001–02	Penrith Panthers	15	5	13	0	46
2004–06	Wests Tigers	8	1	0	0	4
	Total	23	6	13	0	50
- Source: As of 18 February 2017

Ben Reynolds (born 7 January 1982 in Lithgow, New South Wales) is an Australian rugby league footballer who played for the Wests Tigers and Penrith Panthers in the National Rugby League competition. His position of choice is at half-back.

== Career highlights ==
His junior club was the Lithgow Shamrocks. He made his first grade debut for Penrith on 2 June 2001, against the Brisbane Broncos at Penrith Stadium.
