= Colin Best =

Australian rugby league footballer

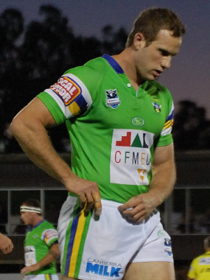
- Best playing for Canberra in 2008

Personal information
- Born: 22 November 1978 (age 47) Sydney, New South Wales, Australia

Playing information
- Height: 189 cm (6 ft 2 in)
- Weight: 99 kg (15 st 8 lb; 218 lb)
- Position: Wing, Centre
Club
Years	Team	Pld	T	G	FG	P
1998–02	Cronulla-Sutherland	81	43	0	0	172
2003–04	Hull FC	63	41	0	0	164
2005–06	St. George Illawarra	45	26	0	0	104
2007–08	Canberra Raiders	44	18	0	0	72
2009–10	South Sydney	40	9	0	0	36
2011–12	Cronulla-Sutherland	45	13	0	0	52
	Total	318	150	0	0	600
Representative
Years	Team	Pld	T	G	FG	P
2001	NSW City	1	0	0	0	0

Colin Best (born 22 November 1978) is an Australian former professional rugby league footballer who played in the 1990s, 2000s and 2010s. He played primarily in the National Rugby League as a wing or centre for Australian clubs, Cronulla-Sutherland Sharks, St. George Illawarra Dragons, Canberra Raiders and South Sydney Rabbitohs. Best also played in the Super League for English club, Hull FC.

== Background ==
Before his rugby league career, Best had also represented Australia at a junior level in indoor soccer and has had tinea ever since.

== Career ==
Best made his first grade debut for Cronulla in round 12 1998 against North Sydney, scoring a try in a 16–12 victory at Shark Park. In 1999, Best made 14 appearances and scored 12 tries as Cronulla won the minor premiership but lost in the preliminary final against rivals St. George at Stadium Australia.

The following year, Best scored 13 tries from 26 games as Cronulla reached the finals but were eliminated by the Brisbane Broncos in the first week. In 2001, Best played in Cronulla's preliminary final defeat against eventual premiers Newcastle.

At the end of 2002, Best signed with Hull in the Super League and spent two years in England before returning to Australia and signing with St. George. In the 2005 NRL season, Best finished as the club's top try scorer with 20 tries. Best played in the club's preliminary final loss against eventual premiers Wests Tigers at the Sydney Football Stadium.

In 2006, Best scored 6 tries in 19 games as St. George reached another preliminary final, however Best missed the match through injury. In 2007, Best signed for Canberra.

In 2008, while playing for Canberra he was awarded the Dally M Winger of the Year Award.

During the 2008 NRL season, Best signed a two-year contract with South Sydney commencing in the 2009. Best scored a try on debut for South Sydney's round 1 victory over rivals the Sydney Roosters which finished 52–12.

In the 2009 State of Origin series Best was named in the 40 man New South Wales preliminary squad but ultimately was not selected for any of the games.

He signed for the Cronulla-Sutherland Sharks for two seasons starting in 2011. At the end of the two seasons, Best announced his retirement, after a 15-year career, playing his final game in a finals lost against former club Canberra. Following his retirement, he was one of seventeen Cronulla players found guilty of using illegal substances under the club's 2011 supplements program, having a twelve-month suspension (which had already expired due to backdating) recorded against his name.

== Career highlights ==
- Junior Club: Engadine Dragons
- First Grade Debut: Round 12, Cronulla v North Sydney, Toyota Park, 30 May 1998
- First Grade Record: 170 appearances scoring 87 tries
