= 2005 NRL season =

Rugby league competition

2005 National Rugby League
- Teams: 15
- Premiers: Wests Tigers (1st title)
- Minor premiers: Parramatta Eels (5th title)
- Matches played: 189
- Points scored: 8861
- Average attendance: 17,337
- Total attendance: 3,276,675
- Top points scorer: Brett Hodgson (308)
- Wooden spoon: Newcastle Knights (1st spoon)
- Dally M Medal: Johnathan Thurston
- Top try-scorer: Matt Bowen (21)

The 2005 NRL season was the 98th season of professional rugby league football in Australia and the eighth run by the National Rugby League. The lineup of clubs remained unchanged from the previous year, with fifteen teams contesting the 2005 Telstra Premiership, which culminated in a grand final between the Wests Tigers and the North Queensland Cowboys.

== Season summary ==
In 2005 the NRL's salary cap was $3.25 million for the 25 highest-paid players in a club.

The season was statistically the closest season ever, with just sixteen points separating the Parramatta Eels (1st) and Newcastle Knights (15th). It was also notable in that the previous four premiers failed to qualify for the finals (Bulldogs, Penrith Panthers, Sydney Roosters and Newcastle Knights).

In the middle of 2005 the NRL reached a broadcasting rights agreement with Foxsports and Channel 9 worth $500 million over six years, representing a 65% increase in direct television income.

The Knights recorded their worst ever start to a season (13 straight losses) and were consigned to last place for the entire season. They did however win 8 of their last 11 games thanks to the return of superstar Andrew Johns. The Knights also defeated five of the top eight teams during the season, four of which were at home. They also recorded their then equal worst ever defeat - a 50-0 thrashing by the Parramatta Eels in round 14. During this match, an EnergyAustralia Stadium attendant ran onto the field, trying to tackle Parramatta's Daniel Wagon before he scored in the 78th minute. Minor premiers the Parramatta Eels lost to each of the bottom four teams (Bulldogs, Rabbitohs, Raiders and Knights in rounds 8, 2, 19 and 20 respectively) during the course of the season.

It was announced that the Gold Coast Titans were to be admitted into the NRL as the sixteenth team, scheduled to begin playing in the 2007 season. The Titans would recruit John Cartwright as their inaugural coach and Preston Campbell was their first signing.

Johnathan Thurston won the 2005 Dally M Medal by a single point from Newcastle's Andrew Johns, despite Johns missing over a third of the season with a broken jaw.

The two clubs that had players sent off won their matches (unlike in 2004) but the dismissal of John Hopoate made rugby league headlines. Hopoate was sent off in his team's win over the Cronulla Sharks and consequently received a 17-match ban. The Sea Eagles then terminated his contract.

The Wests Tigers became the first ever joint venture club to win the premiership, having formed in 2000 as a union between the Balmain Tigers and Western Suburbs Magpies, both foundation members of the original New South Wales Rugby Football League.

=== Teams ===
Brisbane Broncos; 18th season Ground: Suncorp Stadium; Coach: Wayne Bennett; Captain: Darren Lockyer	Canterbury-Bankstown Bulldogs; 71st season Ground: Sydney Showground & Telstra Stadium; Coach: Steve Folkes; Captain: Andrew Ryan	Canberra Raiders; 24th season Ground: Canberra Stadium; Coach: Matthew Elliott; Captain: Simon Woolford	Cronulla-Sutherland Sharks; 39th season Ground: Toyota Stadium; Coach: Stuart Raper; Captain: Brett Kimmorley	Manly Warringah Sea Eagles; 56th season Ground: Brookvale Oval; Coach: Des Hasler; Captain: Michael Monaghan
Melbourne Storm; 8th season Ground Olympic Park; Coach: Craig Bellamy; Captain: Robbie Kearns	New Zealand Warriors; 11th season Ground: Ericsson Stadium; Coach: Tony Kemp; Captain: Steve Price	Newcastle Knights; 18th season Ground: EnergyAustralia Stadium; Coach: Michael Hagan; Captain: Andrew Johns	North Queensland Cowboys; 11th season Ground: Dairy Farmers Stadium; Coach: Graham Murray; Captain: Travis Norton	Parramatta Eels; 59th season Ground: Parramatta Stadium; Coach: Brian Smith; Captain: Nathan Cayless
Penrith Panthers; 39th season Ground: Penrith Football Stadium; Coach: John Lang; Captain: Craig Gower	South Sydney Rabbitohs; 96th season Ground: Aussie Stadium; Coach: Shaun McRae; Captain: Bryan Fletcher→Peter Cusack	St. George Illawarra Dragons; 7th season Ground: OKI Jubilee Stadium & WIN Stadium; Coach: Nathan Brown; Captain: Trent Barrett	Sydney Roosters; 98th season Ground: Aussie Stadium; Coach: Ricky Stuart; Captain: Luke Ricketson	Wests Tigers; 6th season Ground: Campbelltown Stadium & Leichhardt Oval; Coach: Tim Sheens; Captain: Mark O'Neill→Scott Prince

=== Advertising ===
In 2005 the NRL and their advertising agency MJW Hakuhodo for the third year running stayed with the Hoodoo Gurus' "That's My Team" soundtrack and developed three different musical executions.

The campaign focussed on the association of "strength" with the game and the ads featured three different musical interpretations of the song all without vocals. Each was created intending to bring out the positionings of rugby league characteristic of ‘strength of body’, ‘strength of mind’ and ‘strength of character’

Outdoor supersites also featured in suburban locations in NSW and local cinema versions of the TVC ran with a call to action inviting fans to attend a game of the team local to the cinema location.

== Regular season ==
Team	1	2	3	4	5	6	7	8	9	10	11	12	13	14	15	16	17	18	19	20	21	22	23	24	25	26	F1	F2	F3	GF
Brisbane Broncos	**NQL** **+13**	**NZL** **−12**	SYD +18	MEL −46	**PAR** **+40**	SGI +10	CRO +4	**MAN** **+26**	**CBY** **+7**	NQL +17	X	**SOU** **+24**	NEW +18	CAN +8	**WTI** **+18**	NZL −12	**CRO** **+12**	X	**MEL** **+13**	CBY −7	**CAN** **+6**	MAN −1	**SGI** **−20**	PEN −2	**SYD** **−7**	PAR −14	**MEL** **−6**	WTI −28		
Canberra Raiders	X	**NEW** **+25**	SOU +7	**SGI** **+20**	**SYD** **+8**	MAN −22	**MEL** **−36**	NEW +4	PEN +8	**CRO** **−6**	WTI −12	SYD −14	X	**BRI** **−8**	CBY −18	**NQL** **+1**	**PEN** **+8**	MEL −20	**PAR** **+8**	NZL −8	BRI −6	**WTI** **−8**	**SOU** **−13**	NQL −3	PAR −38	**MAN** **−18**				
Canterbury-Bankstown Bulldogs	**SGI** **+18**	NQL −12	**WTI** **−1**	CRO −14	X	**SYD** **−13**	NEW +4	**PAR** **+14**	BRI −7	**MAN** **−8**	MEL +10	NQL −36	**SOU**; **0***	X	**CAN** **+18**	MAN +19	**MEL** **−27**	NZL +2	PEN +2	**BRI** **+7**	SOU −13	**NEW** **−15**	PAR −52	**WTI** **−52**	**PEN** **−22**	SYD −20				
Cronulla-Sutherland Sharks	**PEN** **+6**	MAN −26	PAR +8	**CBY** **+14**	**NQL** **+32**	X	**BRI** **−4**	MEL +20	**NZL** **+4**	CAN +6	PEN +8	**PAR** **−8**	NQL −42	WTI −16	**SYD** **+6**	X	BRI −12	SOU −10	**NEW** **+4***	SGI −10	**WTI** **−40**	**MEL** **+24**	SYD −6	**MAN** **+62**	NEW −30	**SOU** **−4**	SGI −6			
Manly Warringah Sea Eagles	NZL +6	**CRO** **+26**	**MEL** **+7**	X	SGI −26	**CAN** **+22**	**SOU** **+34**	BRI −26	**WTI** **+8**	CBY +8	PAR −6	**PEN** **+10**	SYD +4	SOU −38	**NEW** **+22**	**CBY** **−19**	WTI −25	PEN −4	**SGI** **−26**	X	**NQL** **−2**	**BRI** **+1**	NEW −8	CRO −62	**NZL** **−2**	CAN +18	PAR −24			
Melbourne Storm	**NEW** **+38**	SGI +34	MAN −7	**BRI** **+46**	PEN −20	**PAR** **−12**	CAN +36	**CRO** **−20**	X	SOU +26	**CBY** **−10**	**SGI** **+8**	WTI +16	NZL −8	**PEN** **−14**	**SOU** **+42**	CBY +27	**CAN** **+20**	BRI −13	**SYD** **+14**	NEW −19	CRO −24	**NZL** **+12**	X	**WTI** **+12**	NQL −6	BRI +6	NQL −8		
Newcastle Knights	MEL −38	CAN −25	X	NQL −34	SOU −25	**NZL** **−4**	**CBY** **−4**	**CAN** **−4**	SYD −30	**WTI** **−16**	**SGI** **−2**	X	**BRI** **−18**	**PAR** **−50**	MAN −22	PEN +4	**SYD** **−14**	**NQL** **+4**	CRO −4*	PAR +6	**MEL** **+19**	CBY +15	**MAN** **+8**	NZL +12	**CRO** **+30**	SGI −8				
New Zealand Warriors	**MAN** **−6**	BRI +12	**NQL** **−10**	**SOU** **+32**	**WTI** **−18**	NEW +4	X	**PEN** **−2**	CRO −4	**SYD** **−4**	SOU +18	**WTI** **+17**	SGI −14	**MEL** **+8**	**PAR** **−10**	**BRI** **+12**	NQL −8	**CBY** **−2**	SYD +2	**CAN** **+8**	PEN −8	**PAR** **−18**	MEL −12	**NEW** **−12**	MAN +2	X				
North Queensland Cowboys	BRI −13	**CBY** **+12**	NZL +10	**NEW** **+34**	CRO −32	**WTI** **+24**	PEN +14	**SYD** **+20**	PAR −38	**BRI** **−17**	X	**CBY** **+36**	**CRO** **+42**	SGI −30	X	CAN −1	**NZL** **+8**	NEW −4	**SOU** **−2**	**PEN** **+20**	MAN +2	**SGI** **−20**	WTI −12	**CAN** **+3**	SOU +14	**MEL** **+6**	WTI −44	**MEL** **+8**	PAR +29	WTI −14
Parramatta Eels	WTI +16	SOU −23	**CRO** **−8**	**PEN** **+10**	BRI −40	MEL +12	**WTI** **+10**	CBY −14	**NQL** **+38**	X	**MAN** **+6**	CRO +8	PEN +10	NEW +50	NZL +10	SYD −4	**SOU** **+36**	**SGI** **+26**	CAN −8	**NEW** **−6**	X	NZL +18	**CBY** **+52**	SGI −3	**CAN** **+38**	**BRI** **+14**	**MAN** **+24**	X	**NQL** **−29**	
Penrith Panthers	CRO −6	**SYD** **−8**	**SGI** **+10**	PAR −10	**MEL** **+20**	SOU +30	**NQL** **−14**	NZL +2	**CAN** **−8**	SGI −22	**CRO** **−8**	MAN −10	**PAR** **−10**	X	MEL +14	**NEW** **−4**	CAN −8	**MAN** **+4**	**CBY** **−2**	NQL −20	**NZL** **+8**	SYD +2	X	**BRI** **+2**	CBY +22	WTI +16				
South Sydney Rabbitohs	SYD −12	**PAR** **+23**	**CAN** **−7**	NZL −32	**NEW** **+25**	**PEN** **−30**	MAN −34	X	SGI −32	**MEL** **−26**	**NZL** **−18**	BRI −24	CBY; 0*	**MAN** **+38**	**SGI** **−18**	MEL −42	PAR −36	**CRO** **+10**	NQL +2	WTI −22	**CBY** **+13**	X	CAN +13	SYD +1	**NQL** **−14**	CRO +4				
St. George Illawarra Dragons	CBY −18	**MEL** **−34**	PEN −10	CAN −20	**MAN** **+26**	**BRI** **−10**	SYD +2	WTI +8	**SOU** **+32**	**PEN** **+22**	NEW +2	MEL −8	**NZL** **+14**	**NQL** **+30**	SOU +18	**WTI** **−8**	X	PAR −26	MAN +26	**CRO** **+10**	**SYD** **+38**	NQL +20	BRI +20	**PAR** **+3**	X	**NEW** **+8**	**CRO** **+6**	X	**WTI** **−8**	
Sydney Roosters	**SOU** **+12**	PEN +8	**BRI** **−18**	**WTI** **−6**	CAN −8	CBY +13	**SGI** **−2**	NQL −20	**NEW** **+30**	NZL +4	X	**CAN** **+14**	**MAN** **−4**	X	CRO −6	**PAR** **+4**	NEW +14	WTI −10	**NZL** **−2**	MEL −14	SGI −38	**PEN** **−2**	**CRO** **+6**	**SOU** **−1**	BRI +7	**CBY** **+20**				
Wests Tigers	**PAR** **−16**	X	CBY +1	SYD +6	NZL +18	NQL −24	PAR −10	**SGI** **−8**	MAN −8	NEW +16	**CAN** **+12**	NZL −17	**MEL** **−16**	**CRO** **+16**	BRI −18	SGI +8	**MAN** **+25**	**SYD** **+10**	X	**SOU** **+22**	CRO +40	CAN +8	**NQL** **+12**	CBY +52	MEL −12	**PEN** **−16**	**NQL** **+44**	**BRI** **+28**	SGI +8	**NQL** **+14**
Team	1	2	3	4	5	6	7	8	9	10	11	12	13	14	15	16	17	18	19	20	21	22	23	24	25	26	F1	F2	F3	GF

Bold – Home game
X – Bye
* – Golden point game
Opponent for round listed above margin

=== Ladder ===
2005 NRL season
Pos	Team	Pld	W	D	L	B	PF	PA	PD	Pts
1	Parramatta Eels	24	16	0	8	2	704	456	+248	36
2	St George Illawarra Dragons	24	16	0	8	2	655	510	+145	36
3	Brisbane Broncos	24	15	0	9	2	597	484	+113	34
4	Wests Tigers **(P)**	24	14	0	10	2	676	575	+101	32
5	North Queensland Cowboys	24	14	0	10	2	639	563	+76	32
6	Melbourne Storm	24	13	0	11	2	640	462	+178	30
7	Cronulla-Sutherland Sharks	24	12	0	12	2	550	564	-14	28
8	Manly-Warringah Sea Eagles	24	12	0	12	2	554	632	-78	28
9	Sydney Roosters	24	11	0	13	2	488	487	+1	26
10	Penrith Panthers	24	11	0	13	2	554	554	0	26
11	New Zealand Warriors	24	10	0	14	2	515	528	-13	24
12	Canterbury-Bankstown Bulldogs	24	9	1	14	2	472	670	-198	23
13	South Sydney Rabbitohs	24	9	1	14	2	482	700	-218	23
14	Canberra Raiders	24	9	0	15	2	465	606	-141	22
15	Newcastle Knights	24	8	0	16	2	467	667	-200	20

=== Ladder progression ===
- Numbers highlighted in green indicate that the team finished the round inside the top 8.
- Numbers highlighted in blue indicates the team finished first on the ladder in that round.
- Numbers highlighted in red indicates the team finished in last place on the ladder in that round
- Underlined numbers indicate that the team had a bye during that round.

	Team	1	2	3	4	5	6	7	8	9	10	11	12	13	14	15	16	17	18	19	20	21	22	23	24	25	26
1	Parramatta	2	2	4	4	4	6	8	8	10	12	14	16	18	20	22	22	24	26	26	26	28	30	32	32	34	36
2	St George Illawarra	0	0	0	0	2	2	4	6	8	10	12	12	14	16	18	18	20	20	22	24	26	28	30	32	34	36
3	Brisbane	2	2	4	4	6	8	10	12	14	16	18	20	22	24	26	26	28	30	32	32	34	34	34	34	34	34
4	**Wests**	0	2	4	6	8	8	8	8	8	10	12	12	12	14	14	16	18	20	22	24	26	28	30	32	32	32
5	North Queensland	0	2	4	6	6	8	10	12	12	12	14	16	18	18	20	20	22	22	22	24	26	26	26	28	30	32
6	Melbourne	2	4	4	6	6	6	8	8	10	12	12	14	16	16	16	18	20	22	22	24	24	24	26	28	30	30
7	Cronulla-Sutherland	2	2	4	6	8	10	10	12	14	16	18	18	18	18	20	22	22	22	24	24	24	26	26	28	28	28
8	Manly-Warringah	2	4	6	8	8	10	12	12	14	16	16	18	20	20	22	22	22	22	22	24	24	26	26	26	26	28
9	Sydney	2	4	4	4	4	6	6	6	8	10	12	14	14	16	16	18	20	20	20	20	20	20	22	22	24	26
10	Penrith	0	0	2	2	4	6	6	8	8	8	8	8	8	10	12	12	12	14	14	14	16	18	20	22	24	26
11	New Zealand	0	2	2	4	4	6	8	8	8	8	10	12	12	14	14	16	16	16	18	20	20	20	20	20	22	24
12	Bulldogs	2	2	2	2	4	4	6	8	8	8	10	10	11	13	15	17	17	19	21	23	23	23	23	23	23	23
13	South Sydney	0	2	2	2	4	4	4	6	6	6	6	6	7	9	9	9	9	11	13	13	15	17	19	21	21	23
14	Canberra	2	4	6	8	10	10	10	12	14	14	14	14	16	16	16	18	20	20	22	22	22	22	22	22	22	22
15	Newcastle	0	0	2	2	2	2	2	2	2	2	2	4	4	4	4	6	6	8	8	10	12	14	16	18	20	20

== Finals series ==
To decide the grand finalists from the top eight finishing teams, the NRL adopts the McIntyre final eight system.

Home	Score	Away	Match Information
Home	Score	Away	Date and Time	Venue	Referee	Crowd
Qualifying Finals
Wests Tigers	50 – 6	North Queensland Cowboys	9 September 2005	Telstra Stadium	Paul Simpkins	26,463
Brisbane Broncos	18 – 24	Melbourne Storm	10 September 2005	Suncorp Stadium	Steve Clark	25,193
St. George Illawarra Dragons	28 – 22	Cronulla-Sutherland Sharks	10 September 2005	WIN Stadium	Tony Archer	19,608
Parramatta Eels	46 – 22	Manly Warringah Sea Eagles	11 September 2005	Parramatta Stadium	Tim Mander	19,710
Semi-finals
Melbourne Storm	16 – 24	North Queensland Cowboys	17 September 2005	Aussie Stadium	Paul Simpkins	16,810
Wests Tigers	34 – 6	Brisbane Broncos	18 September 2005	Aussie Stadium	Tim Mander	36,563
Preliminary Finals
St. George Illawarra Dragons	12 – 20	Wests Tigers	24 September 2005	Aussie Stadium	Tim Mander	41,260
Parramatta Eels	0 – 29	North Queensland Cowboys	25 September 2005	Telstra Stadium	Steve Clark	44,327

=== Finals Chart ===
Qualifying finals
1	Parramatta	46
8	Manly	22
2	St. George Illawarra	28
7	Cronulla	22
3	Brisbane	18
6	Melbourne	24
4	Wests	50
5	North Queensland	6

Semifinals
4W	Melbourne	16
2L	North Queensland	24
3W	Wests	34
1L	Brisbane	6

Preliminary finals
1W	Parramatta	0
North Queensland	29
2W	St. George Illawarra	12
Wests	20

Final
North Queensland	16
Wests	30

== Grand Final ==
2005 NRL Grand Final

Sunday, 2 October
19:00 AEST (UTC+10)

Wests Tigers	30 – 16	North Queensland Cowboys
Tries: 5 Gibbs 18'; Richards 35'; Laffranchi 45'; Fitzhenry 63'; Payten 80'; Goals: 5 Hodgson 19', 37', 47', 64', 80' (5/6); Field goals: Prince (0/1)	1st: 12–6; 2nd: 18–10; Report	Tries: 3 Bowen 8'; Norton 55'; Sing 78'; Goals: 2 Hannay 10', 56' (2/3)

Telstra Stadium, Sydney
Attendance: 82,453
Referee: Tim Mander
Touch judges: Steve Carrall, Matt Cecchin
Clive Churchill Medal: Scott Prince (Wests Tigers)

== Statistics and records ==
- The Broncos' Darren Smith was the NRL's oldest player in 2005 at 36 years and 284 days.
- The Brisbane Broncos set a new club record for highest score conceded (50 points) and greatest losing margin (46 points), when they lost 50-4 against the Melbourne Storm at Olympic Park in Round 4. These records were broken in 2019 when they lost 58-0 to the Parramatta Eels in the elimination finals, then again in 2020 when they lost 59-0 to the Sydney Roosters in round 4, which was the first (of two) time Brisbane have failed to score a point at their home of Suncorp Stadium.
- The Newcastle Knights lost a club record 13 straight matches from 13 March - 19 June, and went on to win the wooden spoon for the first time.
- In Rounds 23 and 24, the Canterbury Bulldogs suffered their worst defeats since 1935, when they lost 56-4 against the Parramatta Eels in Round 23, then lost 54-2 against Wests Tigers in Round 24.
- Wests Tigers' club record for their longest winning streak with 8 wins from round 16 to round 24.

== Player statistics ==
The following statistics are as of the conclusion of Round 26.

Top 5 point scorers

Points	Player	Tries	Goals	Field Goals
250	Brett Hodgson	11	103	0
196	Luke Burt	10	78	0
190	Preston Campbell	11	73	0
180	Luke Covell	9	72	0
180	Hazem El Masri	11	68	0

Top 5 try scorers

Tries	Player
19	Shaun Berrigan
19	Billy Slater
18	Colin Best
18	Pat Richards
18	Matt Bowen

Top 5 goal scorers

Goals	Player
103	Brett Hodgson
78	Luke Burt
73	Preston Campbell
72	Luke Covell
68	Hazem El Masri

== 2005 Transfers ==
=== Players ===
Player	2004 Club	2005 Club
Michael De Vere	Brisbane Broncos	Super League: Huddersfield Giants
Craig Frawley	Brisbane Broncos	Canberra Raiders
Paul Green	Brisbane Broncos	Retirement
Ben Ikin	Brisbane Broncos	Retirement
Brad Meyers	Brisbane Broncos	Super League: Bradford Bulls
Gorden Tallis	Brisbane Broncos	Retirement
Carl Webb	Brisbane Broncos	North Queensland Cowboys
Brad Drew	Canberra Raiders	Super League: Huddersfield Giants
Mark McLinden	Canberra Raiders	Super League: London Broncos
Joel Monaghan	Canberra Raiders	Sydney Roosters
Ruben Wiki	Canberra Raiders	New Zealand Warriors
Jamie Feeney	Canterbury-Bankstown Bulldogs	Melbourne Storm
Ben Harris	Canterbury-Bankstown Bulldogs	Super League: Bradford Bulls
Glen Hughes	Canterbury-Bankstown Bulldogs	Retirement
Steve Price	Canterbury-Bankstown Bulldogs	New Zealand Warriors
Dennis Scott	Canterbury-Bankstown Bulldogs	Melbourne Storm
Johnathan Thurston	Canterbury-Bankstown Bulldogs	North Queensland Cowboys
Paul Franze	Cronulla-Sutherland Sharks	Penrith Panthers
Jason Kent	Cronulla-Sutherland Sharks	Super League: Leigh Centurions
Andrew Lomu	Cronulla-Sutherland Sharks	Canberra Raiders
Matthew Rieck	Cronulla-Sutherland Sharks	Wests Tigers
Nick Bradley-Qalilawa	Manly Warringah Sea Eagles	Super League: London Broncos
Ian Donnelly	Manly Warringah Sea Eagles	Melbourne Storm
Solomon Haumono	Manly Warringah Sea Eagles	Super League: London Broncos
Albert Torrens	Manly Warringah Sea Eagles	St. George Illawarra Dragons
Andrew Walker	Manly Warringah Sea Eagles	Suspension
Rodney Howe	Melbourne Storm	Retirement
Stephen Kearney	Melbourne Storm	Super League: Hull F.C.
Ben MacDougall	Melbourne Storm	Edinburgh (Scottish rugby union)
Andrew McFadden	Melbourne Storm	Retirement
Kirk Reynoldson	Melbourne Storm	Newcastle Knights
Danny Williams	Melbourne Storm	Super League: London Broncos
Jamie Fitzgerald	Newcastle Knights	Retirement
Ben Kennedy	Newcastle Knights	Manly Warringah Sea Eagles
Robbie O'Davis	Newcastle Knights	Retirement
Matt Parsons	Newcastle Knights	Retirement
Russell Richardson	Newcastle Knights	Retirement
Timana Tahu	Newcastle Knights	Parramatta Eels
Vinnie Anderson	New Zealand Warriors	Super League: St. Helens
Henry Fa'afili	New Zealand Warriors	Super League: Warrington Wolves
PJ Marsh	New Zealand Warriors	Parramatta Eels
Jerry Seuseu	New Zealand Warriors	Super League: Wigan Warriors
Kevin Campion	North Queensland Cowboys	Retirement
Nathan Fien	North Queensland Cowboys	New Zealand Warriors
Jamie McDonald	North Queensland Cowboys	Melbourne Storm
Glenn Morrison	North Queensland Cowboys	Parramatta Eels
Adam Dykes	Parramatta Eels	Cronulla-Sutherland Sharks
Lee Hopkins	Parramatta Eels	Super League: London Broncos
Junior Langi	Parramatta Eels	Super League: Salford City Reds
Jamie Lyon	Parramatta Eels	Super League: St. Helens
Shane Muspratt	Parramatta Eels	North Queensland Young Guns (Queensland Cup)
Corey Pearson	Parramatta Eels	Retirement
Craig Stapleton	Parramatta Eels	Super League: Leigh Centurions
Chris Thorman	Parramatta Eels	Super League: Huddersfield Giants
David Vaealiki	Parramatta Eels	Super League: Wigan Warriors
James Webster	Parramatta Eels	Hull Kingston Rovers
Michael Witt	Parramatta Eels	Manly Warringah Sea Eagles
Ryan Girdler	Penrith Panthers	Retirement
Martin Lang	Penrith Panthers	Retirement
Amos Roberts	Penrith Panthers	Sydney Roosters
Paul Whatuira	Penrith Panthers	Wests Tigers
Owen Craigie	South Sydney Rabbitohs	Super League: Widnes Vikings
Jason Death	South Sydney Rabbitohs	Retirement
Willie Manu	South Sydney Rabbitohs	St. George Illawarra Dragons
Justin Smith	South Sydney Rabbitohs	North Queensland Cowboys
Paul Stringer	South Sydney Rabbitohs	Parramatta Eels
David Thompson	South Sydney Rabbitohs	Retirement
Brad Watts	South Sydney Rabbitohs	Super League: Widnes Vikings
Nathan Blacklock	St. George Illawarra Dragons	Super League: Hull F.C.
John Carlaw	St. George Illawarra Dragons	Retirement
Andrew Frew	St. George Illawarra Dragons	Retirement
Brent Kite	St. George Illawarra Dragons	Manly Warringah Sea Eagles
Nathan Long	St. George Illawarra Dragons	Retirement
Henry Perenara	St. George Illawarra Dragons	Parramatta Eels
Mark Riddell	St. George Illawarra Dragons	Parramatta Eels
Lincoln Withers	St. George Illawarra Dragons	Canberra Raiders
Todd Byrne	Sydney Roosters	New Zealand Warriors
Peter Cusack	Sydney Roosters	South Sydney Rabbitohs
Luke Dorn	Sydney Roosters	Super League: London Broncos
Brad Fittler	Sydney Roosters	Retirement
Shannon Hegarty	Sydney Roosters	South Sydney Rabbitohs
Justin Hodges	Sydney Roosters	Brisbane Broncos
Gavin Lester	Sydney Roosters	Retirement
Chad Robinson	Sydney Roosters	Parramatta Eels
Michael Buettner	Wests Tigers	Retirement
Nick Graham	Wests Tigers	Retirement
Robert Mears	Wests Tigers	Super League: Leigh Centurions
Jason Moodie	Wests Tigers	N/A
Scott Sattler	Wests Tigers	Retirement
Darren Senter	Wests Tigers	Retirement
Paul Mellor	Super League: Castleford Tigers	Cronulla-Sutherland Sharks
Colin Best	Super League: Hull F.C.	St. George Illawarra Dragons
Jason Smith	Super League: Hull F.C.	Canberra Raiders
Matt Adamson	Super League: Leeds Rhinos	Canberra Raiders
Craig Smith	Super League: Wigan Warriors	Newcastle Knights
Brad Thorn	Crusaders (Super 12)	Brisbane Broncos
Terry Hill	N/A	Manly Warringah Sea Eagles
Daniel Irvine	N/A	Canterbury-Bankstown Bulldogs
Ben Walker	N/A	South Sydney Rabbitohs

=== Coaches ===
Coach	2004 Club	2005 Club
Daniel Anderson	New Zealand Warriors	Super League: St. Helens
