= Paul Simpkins =

Australian rugby league referee

Personal information
- Born: Australia
- Position: Referee

Refereeing information
Years	Competition	Apps
1996–2007	National Rugby League	284

Paul Simpkins is an Australian former professional rugby league referee, officiating in the Australian first-grade competition, the National Rugby League. In addition to regularly working the NRL, Simpkins also officiated at the annual State of Origin tournament between Queensland and New South Wales and the Tri-Nations series. Simpkins officially announced his retirement from refereeing in October, 2007, to further his career with the New South Wales Police Force.

== Career highlights ==
- 2006 NRL Grand Final
- 2006 Tri-nations test series
- State of Origin
