= 2005 Newcastle Knights season =

← 2004	2006 →

The 2005 Newcastle Knights season was the 18th in the club's history. They competed in the NRL's 2005 Telstra Premiership and finished the regular season with the wooden spoon for the first time ever.

The Knights recorded their worst ever start to a season (13 straight losses) and were consigned to last place for the entire year. They did however win 8 of their last 11 games thanks to the return of superstar Andrew Johns, but it wasn't enough for them to avoid the wooden spoon. They also recorded their then equal worst ever defeat - a 50-0 thrashing by the Parramatta Eels in round 14 (this was reversed in round 20). During this match, an EnergyAustralia Stadium attendant ran onto the field, trying to tackle Parramatta's Daniel Wagon before he scored in the 78th minute.

Notable wins in 2005 included wins against Penrith in round 16 (a 28–24 win after trailing 14–0 at halftime), the Knights' first win for 2005, in round 18 against eventual runners-up North Queensland, and then a six-match winning run which included the scalps of eventual minor premiers Parramatta (who then failed to make the Grand Final), defending premiers the Bulldogs (who then failed to make the finals altogether) and the Warriors (whose greatest player Stacey Jones was playing his final home match). It culminated in a 44-14 thrashing of Cronulla (the Knights led 34–0 at halftime before easing off in the second half), the club's biggest win for the season. A loss to the St. George Illawarra Dragons in the final round confirmed Newcastle's wooden spoon, but it was actually the Rabbitohs' win over the Sharks which confirmed Newcastle's last placing for the season in the first place.
