= 2005 Sydney Roosters season =

- NRL rank: 9th
- 2005 record: Wins: 11; draws: 0; losses: 13
- Points scored: For: 488 (86tries, 71goals, 2fieldgoals);

Team information
- Coach: Ricky Stuart
- Captain: Luke Ricketson
- Stadium: Sydney Football Stadium
- Avg. attendance: 16,039

Top scorers
- Tries: Amos Roberts 17
- Goals: Craig Fitzgibbon 57
- Points: Craig Fitzgibbon 118
| ← 2004 | 2005 → |

This 2005 Sydney Roosters season was the 98th in the club's history. They competed in the NRL's 2005 Telstra Premiership and finished the regular season 9th (out of 15).

== Results ==
| Round | Opponent | Result | Syd | Opp. | Date | Venue | Crowd |
|---|---|---|---|---|---|---|---|
| 1 | South Sydney Rabbitohs | Win | 24 | 12 | 12 Mar | Sydney Football Stadium | 22,186 |
| 2 | Penrith Panthers | Win | 28 | 20 | 20 Mar | Penrith Stadium | 18,228 |
| 3 | Brisbane Broncos | Loss | 22 | 40 | 25 Mar | Sydney Football Stadium | 23,157 |
| 4 | Wests Tigers | Loss | 26 | 32 | 3 Apr | Sydney Football Stadium | 13,946 |
| 5 | Canberra Raiders | Loss | 16 | 24 | 10 Apr | Canberra Stadium | 19,130 |
| 6 | Canterbury-Bankstown Bulldogs | Win | 29 | 16 | 15 Apr | Telstra Stadium | 27,111 |
| 7 | St George-Illawarra Dragons | Loss | 24 | 26 | 25 Apr | Sydney Football Stadium | 26,246 |
| 8 | North Queensland Cowboys | Loss | 18 | 38 | 30 Apr | Dairy Farmers Stadium | 22,476 |
| 9 | Newcastle Knights | Win | 32 | 2 | 8 May | Sydney Football Stadium | 8,921 |
| 10 | New Zealand Warriors | Win | 10 | 6 | 15 May | Ericsson Stadium | 10,082 |
| 11 | BYE | | | | | | |
| 12 | Canberra Raiders | Win | 30 | 16 | 28 May | Central Coast Stadium | 16,253 |
| 13 | Manly-Warringah Sea Eagles | Loss | 18 | 22 | 3 Jun | Sydney Football Stadium | 19,787 |
| 14 | BYE | | | | | | |
| 15 | Cronulla-Sutherland Sharks | Loss | 10 | 16 | 17 Jun | Toyota Park | 16,355 |
| 16 | Parramatta Eels | Win | 12 | 8 | 24 Jul | Sydney Football Stadium | 14,885 |
| 17 | Newcastle Knights | Win | 28 | 14 | 2 Jul | EnergyAustralia Stadium | 14,950 |
| 18 | Wests Tigers | Loss | 16 | 26 | 10 Jul | Telstra Stadium | 13,768 |
| 19 | New Zealand Warriors | Loss | 22 | 24 | 16 Jul | Sydney Football Stadium | 13,789 |
| 20 | Melbourne Storm | Loss | 10 | 24 | 24 Jul | Olympic Park | 8,212 |
| 21 | St. George Illawarra Dragons | Loss | 6 | 44 | 29 Jul | WIN Stadium | 19,512 |
| 22 | Penrith Panthers | Loss | 28 | 30 | 7 Aug | Sydney Football Stadium | 13,742 |
| 23 | Cronulla-Sutherland Sharks | Win | 14 | 8 | 13 August | Sydney Football Stadium | 7,842 |
| 24 | South Sydney Rabbitohs | Loss | 16 | 17 | 20 August | Sydney Football Stadium | 17,319 |
| 25 | Brisbane Broncos | Win | 17 | 10 | 26 Aug | Suncorp Stadium | 35,592 |
| 26 | Canterbury-Bankstown Bulldogs | Win | 32 | 12 | 4 September | Sydney Football Stadium | 8,903 |

== Player Summary ==
| Sydney Roosters 2005 | Appearance | Interchange | Tries | Goals | F/G | Points |
|---|---|---|---|---|---|---|
| Ned Catic | 6 | 2 | - | - | - | 0 |
| Jason Cayless | 18 | - | 1 | - | - | 4 |
| Michael Crocker | 7 | 6 | 2 | - | - | 8 |
| Ryan Cross | 18 | - | 10 | - | - | 40 |
| Richard Fa'aoso | 4 | 17 | 1 | - | - | 4 |
| Brett Finch | 18 | 2 | 3 | 2 | - | 16 |
| Brett Firman | 4 | - | 1 | - | - | 4 |
| Craig Fitzgibbon | 21 | 2 | 1 | 57 | - | 118 |
| Chris Flannery | 14 | 6 | 5 | - | - | 20 |
| Ben Hannant | - | 8 | - | - | - | 0 |
| Heath L'Estrange | 5 | 5 | - | - | - | 0 |
| Michael Lett | 2 | 1 | - | - | - | 0 |
| Anthony Minichiello | 22 | - | 14 | - | - | 56 |
| Joel Monaghan | 24 | - | 9 | - | - | 36 |
| Adrian Morley | 20 | 1 | 1 | - | - | 4 |
| Lopini Paea | - | 5 | - | - | - | 0 |
| Mickey Paea | 1 | 3 | - | - | - | 0 |
| Sam Perrett | 3 | - | 2 | - | - | 8 |
| Nigel Plum | 1 | 6 | - | - | - | 0 |
| Luke Ricketson | 21 | - | - | 1 | - | 2 |
| Amos Roberts | 24 | 17 | 13 | - | - | 94 |
| George Rose | 2 | 3 | - | - | - | 0 |
| Adam Schubert | 5 | - | 1 | - | - | 4 |
| Shane Shackleton | - | 2 | - | - | - | 0 |
| David Shillington | 5 | - | - | - | - | 0 |
| Iosia Soliola | 19 | - | 6 | - | - | 24 |
| Jamie Soward | 5 | 2 | 2 | - | - | 8 |
| Anthony Tupou | 7 | 15 | 2 | - | - | 8 |
| Chris Walker | 7 | 1 | 2 | - | - | 8 |
| Stuart Webb | 11 | 5 | 2 | - | - | 8 |
| Craig Wing | 18 | 4 | 4 | - | - | 16 |
| Total | 312 | 96 | 86 | 71 | 2 | 488 |
