= 2006 St. George Illawarra Dragons season =

- NRL rank: 6th
- Play-off result: Preliminary Finals
- 2006 record: Wins: 14; draws: 0; losses: 10
- Points scored: For: 519; against: 481

Team information
- Coach: Nathan Brown
- Captain: Trent Barrett
- Stadium: Jubilee Oval, Wollongong Showground
- Avg. attendance: 15,265
- High attendance: 31,105 (vs. Roosters, round 7)

Top scorers
- Tries: Mark Gasnier (18)
- Goals: Aaron Gorrell (55)
- Points: Aaron Gorrell (130)
← 2005	2007 →

The 2006 St. George Illawarra Dragons season was the eighth in the joint venture club's history. The Dragons competed in the NRL's 2006 premiership season. The team finished sixth in the regular season, making finals but getting knocked out in the preliminary finals against the Melbourne Storm, losing 24–10.

== Squad gains and losses ==
▲ or ▼	Player	2005 Club	2006 Club
▲	Sam Isemonger	Cronulla-Sutherland Sharks	St. George Illawarra Dragons
▲	Andrew Price	Newcastle Knights	St. George Illawarra Dragons
▼	Michael Ennis	St. George Illawarra Dragons	Brisbane Broncos
▼	Daniel Holdsworth	St. George Illawarra Dragons	Canterbury-Bankstown Bulldogs
▼	Willie Manu	St. George Illawarra Dragons	Castleford Tigers (Super League)
▼	Shane Marteene	St. George Illawarra Dragons	Retirement
▼	Bryan Norrie	St. George Illawarra Dragons	Penrith Panthers
▼	Lance Thompson	St. George Illawarra Dragons	Cronulla-Sutherland Sharks
▼	Albert Torrens	St. George Illawarra Dragons	Huddersfield Giants (Super League)
▼	Nick Youngquest	St. George Illawarra Dragons	Penrith Panthers

== Ladder ==
2006 NRL season
Pos	Team	Pld	W	D	L	B	PF	PA	PD	Pts
1	Melbourne Storm	24	20	0	4	2	605	404	+201	44^{1}
2	Canterbury-Bankstown Bulldogs	24	16	0	8	2	608	468	+140	36
3	Brisbane Broncos (P)	24	14	0	10	2	497	392	+105	32
4	Newcastle Knights	24	14	0	10	2	608	538	+70	32
5	Manly Warringah Sea Eagles	24	14	0	10	2	534	493	+41	32
6	St George Illawarra Dragons	24	14	0	10	2	519	481	+38	32
7	Canberra Raiders	24	13	0	11	2	525	573	-48	30
8	Parramatta Eels	24	12	0	12	2	506	483	+23	28
9	North Queensland Cowboys	24	11	0	13	2	450	463	-13	26
10	New Zealand Warriors	24	12	0	12	2	552	463	+89	24^{2}
11	Wests Tigers	24	10	0	14	2	490	565	-75	24
12	Penrith Panthers	24	10	0	14	2	510	587	-77	24
13	Cronulla-Sutherland Sharks	24	9	0	15	2	515	544	-29	22
14	Sydney Roosters	24	8	0	16	2	528	650	-122	20
15	South Sydney Rabbitohs	24	3	0	21	2	429	772	-343	10

^{1} The Melbourne Storm were later stripped of this minor premiership due to gross salary cap breaches.
^{2} The New Zealand Warriors were deducted 4 competition points due to gross salary cap breaches.

=== Ladder Progression ===
Round	1	2	3	4	5	6	7	8	9	10	11	12	13	14	15	16	17	18	19	20	21	22	23	24	25	26
Ladder Position	10th	13th	7th	5th	10th	9th	7th	9th	11th	9th	9th	8th	8th	7th	5th	4th	3rd	2nd	4th	4th	4th	6th	7th	7th	6th	6th

== Season results ==
Round	Home	Score	Away	Match Information
Round	Home	Score	Away	Date	Venue	Referee	Attendance	Source
1	Wests Tigers	24 – 15	St. George Illawarra Dragons	10 March	Stadium Australia	Paul Simpkins	27,865
2	St. George Illawarra Dragons	12 – 13	Penrith Panthers	19 March	Wollongong Showground	Shayne Hayne	12,098
3	South Sydney Rabbitohs	14 – 44	St. George Illawarra Dragons	26 March	Stadium Australia	Jason Robinson	16,049
4	St. George Illawarra Dragons	26 – 12	Brisbane Broncos	2 April	Wollongong Showground	Sean Hampstead	13,708
5	St. George Illawarra Dragons	6 – 54	Newcastle Knights	8 April	Wollongong Showground	Tony Archer	17,467
6	Manly Warringah Sea Eagles	24 – 26	St. George Illawarra Dragons	15 April	Brookvale Oval	Shayne Hayne	18,069
7 (ANZAC Day)	St. George Illawarra Dragons	22 – 12	Sydney Roosters	25 April	Sydney Football Stadium	Steve Clark	31,105
8	Melbourne Storm	24 – 10	St. George Illawarra Dragons	29 April	Olympic Park Stadium	Tony Archer	8,694
9	Cronulla-Sutherland Sharks	30 – 12	St. George Illawarra Dragons	7 May	Endeavour Field	Steve Clark	18,845
10	St. George Illawarra Dragons	22 – 16	New Zealand Warriors	13 May	Wollongong Showground	Gavin Badger	10,117
11		BYE
12	Newcastle Knights	12 – 38	St. George Illawarra Dragons	26 May	Newcastle International Sports Centre	Tony Archer	23,356
13	St. George Illawarra Dragons	8 – 1	Parramatta Eels	2 June	Jubilee Oval	Sean Hampstead	9,075
14	Penrith Panthers	10 – 20	St. George Illawarra Dragons	10 June	Penrith Stadium	Jared Maxwell	9,422
15	Brisbane Broncos	16 – 18	St. George Illawarra Dragons	16 June	Lang Park	Tony Archer	32,914
16	St. George Illawarra Dragons	34 – 14	North Queensland Cowboys	24 June	Wollongong Showground	Paul Simpkins	13,289
17		BYE
18	St. George Illawarra Dragons	38 – 28	South Sydney Rabbitohs	9 July	Jubilee Oval	Jason Robinson	13,126
19	St. George Illawarra Dragons	16 – 22	Canterbury-Bankstown Bulldogs	14 July	Jubilee Oval	Steve Clark	18,223
20	Canberra Raiders	31 – 12	St. George Illawarra Dragons	23 July	Canberra Stadium	Paul Simpkins	13,504
21	St. George Illawarra Dragons	24 – 34	Melbourne Storm	30 July	Jubilee Oval	Sean Hampstead	13,866
22	Parramatta Eels	28 – 6	St. George Illawarra Dragons	4 August	Parramatta Stadium	Steve Clark	19,137
23	Canterbury-Bankstown Bulldogs	26 – 10	St. George Illawarra Dragons	13 August	Stadium Australia	Sean Hampstead	31,256
24	St. George Illawarra Dragons	46 – 16	Wests Tigers	20 August	Jubilee Oval	Shayne Hayne	14,211
25	St. George Illawarra Dragons	18 – 4	Cronulla-Sutherland Sharks	26 August	Wollongong Showground	Paul Simpkins	16,897
26	Sydney Roosters	16 – 36	St. George Illawarra Dragons	2 September	Sydney Cricket Ground	Russell Smith	17,142
FW1	Brisbane Broncos	4 – 20	St. George Illawarra Dragons	9 September	Lang Park	Paul Simpkins	50,387
FW2	St. George Illawarra Dragons	28 – 0	Manly Warringah Sea Eagles	15 September	Sydney Football Stadium	Paul Simpkins	30,907
FW3	Melbourne Storm	24 – 10	St. George Illawarra Dragons	23 September	Stadium Australia	Steve Clark	40,901
