= 2006 Bulldogs RLFC season =

← 2005	2007 →

The 2006 Bulldogs RLFC season was the 72nd in the club's history. They competed in the NRL's 2006 Telstra Premiership, finishing the regular season 2nd out of 15 teams. They went on to come within one match of the grand final but were knocked out by eventual premiers the Brisbane Broncos.

== Season summary ==
The Bulldogs lost a tight match in round 1 against the 2003 premiers Penrith Panthers 24-22. The Bulldogs only lost 4 games in the first half of the season. Played 12, Won 8, Lost 4, Byes 1. The Bulldogs biggest up set in the first half of the season was when they played Newcastle Knights at EnergyAustralia Stadium in round 3 they lost 46-22. The Bulldogs most strongest performance in the first half of the season was in round 2 against Wests Tigers they defeated them 47-12. The Bulldogs second half of the season was the same as the first Played 12, Won 8 Lost 4 Byes 1. In round 13 Hazem El Masri became the top scored tries for the Bulldogs. The old record was 123 which was set by Terry Lamb. Hazem currently holds it with 128 tries. Hazem El Masri was only 4 point shy of hitting the 300 mark again in total point in a season as he did in 2004 with 342points. The Bulldogs went into the final on the back of some poor performances but that certainly didn't affect them, they were on top of the Canberra Raiders the entire match. Even in the miserable conditions it didn't affect them. The Bulldogs did what they do best stuck together and ripped in. The Bulldogs got the luxury of having a week off the following week. In the preliminary final against the Brisbane Broncos the Bulldogs showed some specular plays and tries in the first half and ended up winning the first half 20-6, but cannot say to much about the second half performance from the Bulldogs. The Bulldogs went down to the Broncos 37-20

== Match results ==
2006 Season Results
Round	Opponent	Result	Bulldogs	Opposition	Date	Venue	Crowd
1	Penrith Panthers	Loss	22	24	11 March	Telstra Stadium	17,510
2	Wests Tigers	Win	47	12	17 March	Telstra Stadium	21,340
3	Newcastle Knights	Loss	22	46	24 March	EnergyAustralia Stadium	25,504
4	Bye						
5	Canberra Raiders	Win	30	12	9 April	Canberra Stadium	12,125
6	South Sydney Rabbitohs	Win	26	18	17 April	Telstra Stadium	19,529
7	Manly Sea Eagles	Loss	14	40	23 April	Telstra Stadium	13,621
8	New Zealand Warriors	Win	30	16	30 April	Ericsson Stadium	11,664
9	Sydney Roosters	Win	30	14	7 May	Sydney Football Stadium	16,121
10	Parramatta Eels	Win	22	18	14 May	Telstra Stadium	13,159
11	Cronulla Sharks	Win	32	24	21 May	Telstra Stadium	12,728
12	Brisbane Broncos	Loss	6	25	27 May	Suncorp Stadium	30,589
13	Newcastle Knights	Win	38	22	3 June	Telstra Stadium	12,658
14	Canberra Raiders	Loss	26	28	12 June	Telstra Stadium	12,541
15	North Queensland Cowboys	Won	20	12	18 June	Carrara Stadium	16,231
16	Melbourne Storm	Loss	12	16	23 June	Olympic Park	10,373
17	Wests Tigers	Win	32	10	2 July	Telstra Stadium	22,515
18	New Zealand Warriors	Win	22	18	9 July	Telstra Stadium	14,067
19	St George Illawarra Dragons	Win	22	16	14 July	Oki Jubilee Stadium	18,223
20	Sydney Roosters	Win	25	0	22 July	Telstra Stadium	14,020
21	Bye						
22	North Queensland Cowboys	Win	54	14	5 August	Dairy Farmers Stadium	20,486
23	St George Illawarra Dragons	Win	26	10	13 August	Telstra Stadium	31,256
24	Brisbane Broncos	Loss	0	30	18 August	Telstra Stadium	26,111
25	Manly Sea Eagles	Loss	20	21	25 August	Brookvale Oval	20,163
26	Penrith Panthers	Win	30	22	3 September	CUA Stadium	13,363
QF	Canberra Raiders	Win	30	12	9 September	Telstra Stadium	14,628
PF	Brisbane Broncos	Loss	20	37	22 September	Sydney Football Stadium	29,511

Round	Position
1	9/15
2	5/15
3	8/15
4	6/15
5	5/15
6	3/15
7	6/15
8	8/15
9	4/15
10	5/15
11	5/15
12	5/15
13	3/15
14	5/15
15	4/15
16	5/15
17	2/15
18	4/15
19	2/15
20	2/15
21	2/15
22	2/15
23	2/15
24	2/15
25	2/15
26	2/15

== Ladder ==
2006 NRL season
Pos	Team	Pld	W	D	L	B	PF	PA	PD	Pts
1	Melbourne Storm	24	20	0	4	2	605	404	+201	44^{1}
2	Canterbury-Bankstown Bulldogs	24	16	0	8	2	608	468	+140	36
3	Brisbane Broncos (P)	24	14	0	10	2	497	392	+105	32
4	Newcastle Knights	24	14	0	10	2	608	538	+70	32
5	Manly Warringah Sea Eagles	24	14	0	10	2	534	493	+41	32
6	St George Illawarra Dragons	24	14	0	10	2	519	481	+38	32
7	Canberra Raiders	24	13	0	11	2	525	573	-48	30
8	Parramatta Eels	24	12	0	12	2	506	483	+23	28
9	North Queensland Cowboys	24	11	0	13	2	450	463	-13	26
10	New Zealand Warriors	24	12	0	12	2	552	463	+89	24^{2}
11	Wests Tigers	24	10	0	14	2	490	565	-75	24
12	Penrith Panthers	24	10	0	14	2	510	587	-77	24
13	Cronulla-Sutherland Sharks	24	9	0	15	2	515	544	-29	22
14	Sydney Roosters	24	8	0	16	2	528	650	-122	20
15	South Sydney Rabbitohs	24	3	0	21	2	429	772	-343	10

^{1} The Melbourne Storm were later stripped of this minor premiership due to gross salary cap breaches.
^{2} The New Zealand Warriors were deducted 4 competition points due to gross salary cap breaches.

== Crowds ==
The Canterbury Bulldogs average crowd (not including finals) for 2006 was 18,211

*includes finals matches
Games	Played	Crowd Total	Average
All Games*	26	481,219	18,508
Home Games	12	216,489	18,040
Away Games	12	220,591	18,382
Finals	2	44,139	22,069

All Games*: Played:26 Total: 481,219 Average: 18,508
Home Games: Played: 12 Total: 216,489 Average: 18,040
Away Games: Played:12 Total: 220,591 Average: 18,382
Finals*: Played: 2 Total: 44,139 Average: 22,069

== Players (29) ==
Current to Season End, 2006
Player	Appearance	Tries	Goals	F Goals	Points
Chris Armit	24	2	0	0	8
Roy Asotasi	23	2	0	0	8
Trent Cutler	7	3	0	0	12
Ben Czislowski	1	0	0	0	0
Hazem El Masri	26	17	114/132	0	296
Andrew Emelio	15	7	0	0	28
Jon Green	2	0	0	0	0
Tony Grimaldi	21	2	0	0	8
Jarrad Hickey	7	1	0	0	4
Daniel Holdsworth	26	8	0	0	32
Corey Hughes	24	4	0	0	16
Daniel Irvine	3	0	0	0	0
Nick Kouparitsas	3	0	0	0	0
Reni Maitua	24	6	0	0	24
Willie Mason	20	4	0	0	16
Dallas Mcilwain	9	2	0	0	8
Brad Morrin	13	1	0	0	4
Nate Myles	20	1	0	0	4
Billy Ngawini	3	0	0	0	0
Mark O'Meley	20	1	0	0	4
Luke Patten	26	10	0	0	40
Adam Perry	12	0	0	0	0
Cameron Phelps	12	1	0	0	4
Ben Roberts	6	0	0	0	0
Andrew Ryan	24	7	0	0	28
Brent Sherwin	19	4	0	2	18
Willie Tonga	16	8	0	0	32
Matt Utai	16	7	0	0	28
Sonny Bill Williams	21	8	0	0	32

=== Player movements ===
Gains

2006Signings/Transfers
Player	Previous club	Years signed	Until the end of
Daryl Millard	St George Illawarra Dragons	3 Years	2009
Kane Cleal	South Sydney Rabbitohs	2 Years	2008
Brent Crisp	Canberra Raiders	2 Years	2008
Lee Te Maari	St George Illawarra Dragons	2 Years	2008
Aaron Wheatley	St George Illawarra Dragons	1 Years	2007
Ryan Millard	St George Illawarra Dragons	Unknown duration	Unknown Year
Leon Bott	Cronulla Sharks	Unknown duration	Unknown Year

Losses

Losses
Player	Notes
Roy Asotasi	Contract with the South Sydney Rabbitohs
Daniel Irvine	Contract with the South Sydney Rabbitohs
Nate Myles	Contract with the Sydney Roosters
Ben Czislowski	Contract with the Wynnum Manly
Daniel Conn	Contract with the Gold Coast Titans

Re-Signings

Re-Signings
Player	Years signed	Until the end of
Reni Maitua	3 Years	2009
Jarrad Hickey	2 Years	2008
Chris Armit	2 Years	2008
Luke Patten	2 Years	2008
Willie Tonga	2 Years	2008
Andrew Emelio	2 Years	2008
Dallas McIlwain	1 Years	2007
Brad Morrin	1 Years	2007
Tony Grimaldi (in doubt because of injury)	1 Years	2007

== Footnotes ==
- Woods B (2007). El Magic - The Life of Hazem El Masri. Harper Collins Publishing. ISBN 0-7322-8402-3
- Andrews M (2006). The ABC of Rugby League. ABC Publishing. ISBN 0-7333-1946-7
- Whiticker A & Hudson G (2005). Canterbury Bulldogs - The Encyclopedia of Rugby League Players. Bas Publishing. ISBN 1-920910-50-6
- Whittaker A & Collis I (2004). The History of Rugby League Clubs. ISBN 978-1-74110-470-7
- Lane D (1996). A Family Betrayal - One Man's Super League War - Jarred McCracken. Ironbark Publishing. ISBN 0-330-35839-1
- Chesterton R (1996). Good as Gould - Phil Gould's Stormy Life in Football. Ironbark Publishing. ISBN 0-330-35873-1
- Lester G (1991). The Bulldog Story. Playright Publishing. ISBN 0-646-04447-8
- Whiticker A (1992). The Terry Lamb Story. Gary Allen Publishing. ISBN 1-875169-14-8
- Tasker N (1988). Top-Dog - The Steve Mortimer Story. Century Hutchinson Publishing. ISBN 0-09-169231-8
- Lester G (1985). Berries to Bulldogs. Lester - Townsend Publishing. ISBN 0-949853-06-2
- NRL Official Information Handbook (2001–2007). Season Guide.
- Middleton D (1987–2006). The Official NSWRL, ARL, NRL Yearbook / Annual.
- Christensen EE (1946–1977). NSWRL Yearbook.
- Rugby League Review (2003–2007).
- Big League (1974–2007).
- Rugby League Week (1970–2007).
- The Rugby League News.

== See also ==
List of Canterbury-Bankstown Bulldogs seasons
