= 2006 North Queensland Cowboys season =

National Rugby League team season

Coordinates: 19°18′58″S 146°42′43″E

- NRL Rank: 9th
- Play-off result: Missed finals
- record: Wins: 11; draws: 0; losses: 13
- Points scored: For: 450; against: 463

Team information
- CEO: Peter Parr
- Coach: Graham Murray
- Captain: Travis Norton
- Stadium: Dairy Farmers Stadium
- Avg. attendance: 19,681
- High attendance: 24,658 (vs. Brisbane Broncos, Round 20)

Top scorers
- Tries: Matt Sing (13)
- Goals: Johnathan Thurston (49)
- Points: Johnathan Thurston (142)
← 2005	2007 →

The 2006 North Queensland Cowboys season was the 12th in the club's history. Coached by Graham Murray and captained by Travis Norton, they competed in the NRL's 2006 Telstra Premiership.

== Season summary ==
Coming off the back of their maiden Grand Final appearance, the Cowboys were strong premiership favourites heading into the 2006 season. They looked like they would be living up to those expectations, with a six-game winning streak to start the season. It wouldn't last though, as the club would lose eight of their next 10, including a six-game losing streak which left them outside the Top 8 halfway through the season. A win against arch-rivals Brisbane in the Queensland derby put them into 6th place with six games remaining but they would lose Johnathan Thurston to injury and another losing streak followed, dashing their finals aspirations. Wins over South Sydney and Parramatta ended their season a good note but it wasn't enough, the pre-season title favourites finishing the season in 9th.

Despite the disappointing season, 2006 saw the debut of club legend Gavin Cooper, who made his debut in Round 2. Cooper would leave the club at the end of the year, spending two seasons with the Gold Coast Titans and two with the Penrith Panthers before rejoining the Cowboys in 2011. Cooper would become an integral part of the club, starting in their 2015 NRL Grand Final and 2016 World Club Challenge winning sides.

2006 was also the final season for club stalwarts Travis Norton and Matt Sing. Norton, who captained the side from 2004 to 2007, and Sing, who scored 73 tries for the club and rejuvenated his career in the process, were key figures in the club's transformation from cellar dwellers into a credible premiership threat. In 2015, Sing was one of the two inaugural inductees into the Cowboys Hall of Fame.

=== Milestones ===
- Round 2: Clint Amos and Gavin Cooper made their NRL debuts.
- Round 4: Mitchell Sargent played his 50th game for the club.
- Round 5: Shane Tronc played his 50th game for the club.
- Round 5: Gavin Cooper scored his first NRL try.
- Round 7: Steve Southern played his 50th game for the club.
- Round 7: Ashley Graham made his debut for the club.
- Round 10: Robert Tanielu made his debut for the club.
- Round 14: Travis Norton played his 50th game for the club.
- Round 16: Rod Jensen played his 50th game for the club.
- Round 16: Ray Cashmere made his debut for the club.
- Round 17: Mark Henry and Brent McConnell made their NRL debuts.
- Round 17: Brent McConnell scored his first NRL try.
- Round 21: Mark Henry scored his first NRL try.
- Round 22: David Faiumu played his 50th game for the club.
- Round 22: Matt Sing played his 100th game for the club.
- Round 26: Josh Hannay played his 150th game for the club.

== Squad List ==
North Queensland Cowboys NRL Squad 2006
First team squad			Coaching staff
Clint Amos – HK; Brett Anderson – CE; Jason Barsley – WG; Brenton Bowen – WG; Matthew Bowen – FB; Paul Bowman – CE; Ray Cashmere – PR; Gavin Cooper – SR; Mark Dalle Cort – SR; David Faiumu – HK; Brett Firman – FE	Ashley Graham – WG; Josh Hannay – CE; Mark Henry – WG; Rod Jensen – LK; Jacob Lillyman – PR; Ben Lowe – SR; Brent McConnell – HB; Shane Muspratt – FE; Travis Norton (c) – LK; Luke O'Donnell – SR; Aaron Payne – HK	Mitchell Sargent – PR; Matthew Scott – PR; Justin Smith – SR; Steve Southern – SR; Daniel Strickland – SR; Neil Sweeney – WG; Robert Tanielu – PR; Johnathan Thurston – HB; Shane Tronc – PR; Carl Webb – PR; Ty Williams – WG	Head coach: Graham Murray; Assistant coaches: Neil Henry (assistant coach); Grant Bell (assistant coach); Kelly Egan (football manager); Billy Johnstone (strength & conditioning coach); Legend: (c) Captain(s); (vc) Vice-captain(s)

== Squad Movement ==
=== 2006 Gains ===
Player	Signed From
Russell Aitken	Cronulla Sharks
Brett Anderson	Parramatta Eels
Ray Cashmere	Wests Tigers
Ashley Graham	Parramatta Eels (mid-season)
Mark Henry	Central Comets
Robert Tanielu	Melbourne Storm

=== 2006 Losses ===
Player	Signed To
Russell Aitken	Melbourne Storm (mid-season)
Rory Bromley	Redcliffe Dolphins
Jaiman Lowe	South Sydney Rabbitohs
Micheal Luck	Warriors
Leigh McWilliams	Retired
David Myles	Toulouse Olympique
Paul Rauhihi	Warrington Wolves

== Ladder ==
2006 NRL season
Pos	Team	Pld	W	D	L	B	PF	PA	PD	Pts
1	Melbourne Storm	24	20	0	4	2	605	404	+201	44^{1}
2	Canterbury-Bankstown Bulldogs	24	16	0	8	2	608	468	+140	36
3	Brisbane Broncos (P)	24	14	0	10	2	497	392	+105	32
4	Newcastle Knights	24	14	0	10	2	608	538	+70	32
5	Manly Warringah Sea Eagles	24	14	0	10	2	534	493	+41	32
6	St George Illawarra Dragons	24	14	0	10	2	519	481	+38	32
7	Canberra Raiders	24	13	0	11	2	525	573	-48	30
8	Parramatta Eels	24	12	0	12	2	506	483	+23	28
9	North Queensland Cowboys	24	11	0	13	2	450	463	-13	26
10	New Zealand Warriors	24	12	0	12	2	552	463	+89	24^{2}
11	Wests Tigers	24	10	0	14	2	490	565	-75	24
12	Penrith Panthers	24	10	0	14	2	510	587	-77	24
13	Cronulla-Sutherland Sharks	24	9	0	15	2	515	544	-29	22
14	Sydney Roosters	24	8	0	16	2	528	650	-122	20
15	South Sydney Rabbitohs	24	3	0	21	2	429	772	-343	10

^{1} The Melbourne Storm were later stripped of this minor premiership due to gross salary cap breaches.
^{2} The New Zealand Warriors were deducted 4 competition points due to gross salary cap breaches.

== Fixtures ==
=== Regular season ===
Date	Round	Opponent	Venue	Score	Tries	Goals	Attendance
12 March	Round 1	Brisbane Broncos	Suncorp Stadium	36 – 4	Thurston (3), Bowen, Sing, Sweeney	Thurston (6/7)	46,229
18 March	Round 2	Manly Sea Eagles	Dairy Farmers Stadium	20 – 16	Sing (3), Firman	Thurston (2/6)	23,936
25 March	Round 3	Melbourne Storm	Dairy Farmers Stadium	40 – 8	Thurston (2), Bowman, O'Donnell, Sweeney, Williams	Thurston (8/8)	21,346
31 March	Round 4	Parramatta Eels	Parramatta Stadium	26 – 18	Sing (2), Faiumu, Scott	Thurston (5/6)	15,131
7 April	Round 5	Wests Tigers	Dairy Farmers Stadium	32 – 12	Jensen (2), Cooper, Sing, Thurston	Thurston (6/7)	20,262
16 April	Round 6	Newcastle Knights	EnergyAustralia Stadium	18 – 16	Bowen, Sargent, Thurston	Thurston (3/3)	26,048
22 April	Round 7	Cronulla Sharks	Toyota Park	22 – 24	O'Donnell (2), Jensen, Sing	Thurston (3/4)	9,025
29 April	Round 8	Sydney Roosters	Dairy Farmers Stadium	18 – 22	Payne, Sweeney, Thurston	Thurston (3/3)	21,175
6 May	Round 9	Penrith Panthers	Dairy Farmers Stadium	22 – 6	B. Bowen, Payne, Thurston, Tronc	Thurston (3/4)	16,808
13 May	Round 10	Melbourne Storm	Olympic Park	6 – 18	B. Bowen	Thurston (1/1)	10,830
	Round 11	Bye					
27 May	Round 12	Canberra Raiders	Dairy Farmers Stadium	14 – 15	Cooper, Thurston	Thurston (3/3)	16,971
4 June	Round 13	Wests Tigers	Telstra Stadium	14 – 24	Bowman, Cooper, Thurston	Thurston (1/3)	16,736
10 June	Round 14	Cronulla Sharks	Dairy Farmers Stadium	4 – 26	B. Bowen	Hannay (0/1)	16,778
18 June	Round 15	Canterbury Bulldogs	Carrara Stadium	12 – 20	B. Bowen, Bowman	Thurston (2/2)	16,231
24 June	Round 16	St George Illawarra Dragons	WIN Stadium	14 – 34	Hannay, Sing, Sweeney	Thurston (1/4)	13,289
1 July	Round 17	South Sydney Rabbitohs	Dairy Farmers Stadium	16 – 14	Payne (2), McConnell	McConnell (1/1), Smith (1/2)	17,506
	Round 18	Bye					
15 July	Round 19	Penrith Panthers	CUA Stadium	8 – 17	Southern	Thurston (2/2)	8,212
22 July	Round 20	Brisbane Broncos	Dairy Farmers Stadium	26 – 10	Sing (3), Graham, Hannay	Hannay (3/6)	24,658
30 July	Round 21	Sydney Roosters	Sydney Football Stadium	20 – 40	Henry, Graham, Sing	Hannay (2/4)	7,617
5 August	Round 22	Canterbury Bulldogs	Dairy Farmers Stadium	14 – 54	Graham, Henry, Scott	Graham (1/2), Smith (0/1)	20,486
12 August	Round 23	Warriors	Mt Smart Stadium	0 – 26			5,425
19 August	Round 24	Newcastle Knights	Dairy Farmers Stadium	12 – 19	Smith, Sweeney	McConnell (1/1), Sweeney (1/1)	17,898
27 August	Round 25	South Sydney Rabbitohs	Telstra Stadium	34 – 12	Smith (2), Bowen, Faiumu, O'Donnell, Payne	Graham (5/7)	8,914
1 September	Round 26	Parramatta Eels	Dairy Farmers Stadium	22 – 8	Bowen (2), Payne, Sweeney	Hannay (3/4)	18,351
Legend: Win Loss Draw Bye

== Statistics ==
Name	App	T	G	FG	Pts
Clint Amos	6	-	-	-	-
Brenton Bowen	7	4	-	-	16
Matthew Bowen	24	5	-	-	20
Paul Bowman	16	3	-	-	12
Ray Cashmere	6	-	-	-	-
Gavin Cooper	18	3	-	-	12
David Faiumu	18	2	-	-	8
Brett Firman	7	1	-	-	4
Ashley Graham	14	3	6	-	24
Josh Hannay	9	2	8	-	24
Mark Henry	8	3	-	-	12
Rod Jensen	12	3	-	-	12
Jacob Lillyman	15	-	-	-	-
Brent McConnell	3	1	2	-	8
Shane Muspratt	2	-	-	-	-
Travis Norton	20	-	-	-	-
Luke O'Donnell	16	4	-	-	16
Aaron Payne	21	6	-	-	24
Mitchell Sargent	20	1	-	-	4
Matthew Scott	22	2	-	-	8
Matt Sing	24	13	-	-	52
Justin Smith	22	3	1	-	14
Steve Southern	18	1	-	-	4
Daniel Strickland	1	-	-	-	-
Neil Sweeney	13	6	1	-	26
Robert Tanielu	3	-	-	-	-
Johnathan Thurston	17	11	49	-	142
Shane Tronc	21	1	-	-	4
Carl Webb	20	-	-	-	-
Ty Williams	5	1	-	-	4
Totals		79	67	0	450

== Representatives ==
The following players played a representative match in 2006.

	ANZAC Test	City vs Country	State of Origin 1	State of Origin 2	State of Origin 3	Tri-Nations	World Cup qualifiers
Matthew Bowen	-	-	Queensland	-	-	-	-
David Faiumu	New Zealand	-	-	-	-	-	-
Josh Hannay	-	-	-	-	Queensland	-	-
Jacob Lillyman	-	-	-	Queensland	-	-	-
Luke O'Donnell	Australia	-	New South Wales	-	New South Wales	Australia	-
Mitchell Sargent	-	Country	-	-	-	-	-
Matthew Scott	-	-	Queensland	-	-	-	-
Malo Solomona	-	-	-	-	-	-	Samoa
Johnathan Thurston	Australia	-	Queensland	Queensland	Queensland	Australia	-
Carl Webb	-	-	Queensland	Queensland	Queensland	-	-

== Honours ==
=== League ===
- Wally Lewis Medal: Johnathan Thurston

=== Club ===
- Player of the Year: Aaron Payne
- Player's Player: Luke O'Donnell
- Club Person of the Year: Glen Murphy

== Feeder Clubs ==
=== Queensland Cup ===
- North Queensland Young Guns - 2nd, lost semi final
