= 2006 Cronulla-Sutherland Sharks season =

- NRL rank: 13th
- 2006 record: Wins: 9; draws: 0; losses: 15
- Points scored: For: 515 (88 tries, 81 goals, 1 field goal); against: 544 (96 tries, 80 goals)

Team information
- Coach: Stuart Raper
- Captain: Brett Kimmorley
- Stadium: Toyota Park
- Avg. attendance: 12,488

Top scorers
- Tries: Darren Albert (12)
- Goals: Luke Covell (80)
- Points: Luke Covell (192)
← 2005	2007 →

The 2006 Cronulla-Sutherland Sharks season was the 40th in the club's history. They competed in the 2006 National Rugby League season.

== Season summary ==
The off-season was highlighted by the huge but controversial signing of former St. George Illawarra Dragons favourite Lance Thompson who was let go by the Dragons due to salary cap issues and in-fighting occurring at that club.

Following a first round bye, the Sharks had a slow start to the season before a win against the South Sydney Rabbitohs in round four appeared to get things going. There were mixed results throughout the season, including two wins against the previous year's grand finalists North Queensland and a home win against the St. George Illawarra Dragons (its first against them since 2002), however after its round 16 away win against the Newcastle Knights in Newcastle everything started to fall apart with the Sharks, seemingly on their way to the finals, losing their last nine matches of the season. By the season's end, the Sharks had fallen to 13th place (third-last) and coach Stuart Raper, knowing his time was up, was sacked. There were calls from passionate Sharks fans and the media for Ricky Stuart, at the time the Test coach who had also just been dismissed by the Sydney Roosters, to be installed as Cronulla coach. Ending months of speculation, Stuart was signed on as Sharks coach in the belief that the Sharks would once again return to the summit of the competition.

== Ladder ==
2006 NRL season
Pos	Team	Pld	W	D	L	B	PF	PA	PD	Pts
1	Melbourne Storm	24	20	0	4	2	605	404	+201	44^{1}
2	Canterbury-Bankstown Bulldogs	24	16	0	8	2	608	468	+140	36
3	Brisbane Broncos (P)	24	14	0	10	2	497	392	+105	32
4	Newcastle Knights	24	14	0	10	2	608	538	+70	32
5	Manly Warringah Sea Eagles	24	14	0	10	2	534	493	+41	32
6	St George Illawarra Dragons	24	14	0	10	2	519	481	+38	32
7	Canberra Raiders	24	13	0	11	2	525	573	-48	30
8	Parramatta Eels	24	12	0	12	2	506	483	+23	28
9	North Queensland Cowboys	24	11	0	13	2	450	463	-13	26
10	New Zealand Warriors	24	12	0	12	2	552	463	+89	24^{2}
11	Wests Tigers	24	10	0	14	2	490	565	-75	24
12	Penrith Panthers	24	10	0	14	2	510	587	-77	24
13	Cronulla-Sutherland Sharks	24	9	0	15	2	515	544	-29	22
14	Sydney Roosters	24	8	0	16	2	528	650	-122	20
15	South Sydney Rabbitohs	24	3	0	21	2	429	772	-343	10

^{1} The Melbourne Storm were later stripped of this minor premiership due to gross salary cap breaches.
^{2} The New Zealand Warriors were deducted 4 competition points due to gross salary cap breaches.

== Club Awards ==
- Player of the year- Greg Bird
- Chairman’s Award - Lance Thompson
- Rookie of the Year - Luke Douglas
- Clubman of the Year - Luke Covell
- Supporters Player of the Year – Paul Gallen
- Premier League Player of the Year - Darren Mapp
- Premier League Player’s Player – Luke Harlen
- Jersey Flegg Player of the Year – Tu’u Maori
- Jersey Flegg Best Forward – Leonard Ropeta
