= 2006 Canberra Raiders season =

NRL Season

- NRL rank: 7th
- Play-off result: Lost in qualifying final
- 2006 record: Wins: 13; draws: 0; losses: 11
- Points scored: For: 525; against: 573

Team information
- CEO: Simon Hawkins
- Coach Assistant Coach: Matthew Elliott; David Furner
- Captain: Clinton Schifcofske
- Stadium: Canberra Stadium
- Avg. attendance: 11,489
- High attendance: 21,255

Top scorers
- Tries: Todd Carney, Adam Mogg (12)
- Points: Clinton Schifcofske (178)
← 2005	List of seasons	2007 →

The 2006 Canberra Raiders season was the 25th in the club's history. They competed in the NRL's 2006 Telstra Premiership, finishing the regular season 7th (out of 15) to make the finals. They were knocked out of the play-offs in the first week by the Bulldogs.

== Season summary ==
The Raiders started the 2006 season heavy favourites to run last, however the raiders' players believed that they could make the top 8, but despite this external pessimism and heavy losses to the Knights and the Roosters early on, fought back and guaranteed themselves a finals berth with a round to play. 2006 saw club stalwarts Simon Woolford, newly named captain, Clinton Schifcofske and the club's longest serving player, Jason Croker, leave the club, going to St George Illawarra, the Queensland Reds rugby union team and the Super League club the Catalans Dragons respectively. Outgoing backs Schifcofske and Adam Mogg both earned representative berths with Queensland in State of Origin. Saturday 9 September 2006 saw Jason Croker, Simon Woolford, Clinton Schifcofske, Michael Hodgson, Jason Smith and Adam Mogg all play their final games for the club. The round one finals series clash with the Bulldogs saw the Raiders defeated 30-12 in slippery and muddy conditions at Telstra Stadium, and eliminated from the 2006 premiership race. This was also the final match for coach Matthew Elliott, who is coaching Penrith in 2007. His replacement was former North Queensland Cowboys' assistant coach Neil Henry.

== Season results ==
Trial Games
Round	Opponent	Result	Can.	Opp.	Date	Venue	Crowd	Position
Trial 1	New Zealand Warriors	Win	28	16	Feb 12	North Harbour Stadium	11,000	N/A
Trial 2	Brisbane Broncos	Loss	20	28	Feb 18	Port Macquarie Regional Stadium	6,000	N/A
NRL Regular Season Games
1	Manly-Warringah Sea Eagles	Win	27	14	11 Mar	Brookvale Oval	17,135	4/15
2	Newcastle Knights	Loss	32	70	19 Mar	Canberra Stadium	11,606	10/15
3	Sydney Roosters	Loss	56	20	26 Mar	Sydney Football Stadium	9,826	14/15
4	Penrith Panthers	Win	21	20	1 Apr	Canberra Stadium	9,399	12/15
5	Bulldogs	Loss	12	30	9 Apr	Canberra Stadium	12,125	12/15
6	New Zealand Warriors	Win	18	14	15 Apr	Canberra Stadium	7,174	11/15
7	BYE				21-23 Apr			9/15
8	Brisbane Broncos	Loss	28	30	29 Apr	Suncorp Stadium	23,582	12/15
9	Parramatta Eels	Win	30	10	6 May	Parramatta Stadium	10,146	9/15
10	Cronulla Sharks	Loss	18	14	14 May	Canberra Stadium	9,695	12/15
11	Newcastle Knights	Loss	22	12	20 May	Energy Australia Stadium	18,236	12/15
12	North Queensland Cowboys	Win	15	14	27 May	Dairy Farmers Stadium	16,971	12/15
13	South Sydney Rabbitohs	Win	24	22	3 Jun	Canberra Stadium	10,150	10/15
14	Bulldogs	Win	28	26	12 Jun	Telstra Stadium	12,541	9/15
15	Melbourne Storm	Loss	22	12	18 Jun	Olympic Park	7,954	10/15
16	Sydney Roosters	Win	42	10	25 Jun	Canberra Stadium	11,876	8/15
17	Parramatta Eels	Loss	12	18	1 Jul	Canberra Stadium	8,824	9/15
18	Penrith Panthers	Loss	12	24	8 Jul	Penrith Stadium	9,111	11/15
19	Wests Tigers	Win	20	18	16 Jul	Canberra Stadium	9,125	10/15
20	St George Illawarra Dragons	Win	31	12	23 Jul	Canberra Stadium	13,504	9/15
21	South Sydney Rabbitohs	Loss	8	21	29 Jul	Telstra Stadium	6,152	12/15
22	Brisbane Broncos	Win	30	18	6 Aug	Canberra Stadium	13,137	8/15
23	Wests Tigers	Win	19	18	13 Aug	Campbelltown Stadium	18,474	8/15
24	BYE				18-20 Aug			8/15
25	Melbourne Storm	Loss	18	22	26 Aug	Canberra Stadium	21,255	8/15
26	Cronulla Sharks	Win	26	24	2 Sep	Toyota Stadium	9,289	7/15
NRL Finals Games
QF	Bulldogs	Loss	12	30	9 Sep	Telstra Stadium	14,628	N/A

Colour	Result
Green	Win
Red	Loss
Yellow	Golden point Win
Blue	Bye

Round 19
Raiders playing the Tigers at Canberra Stadium

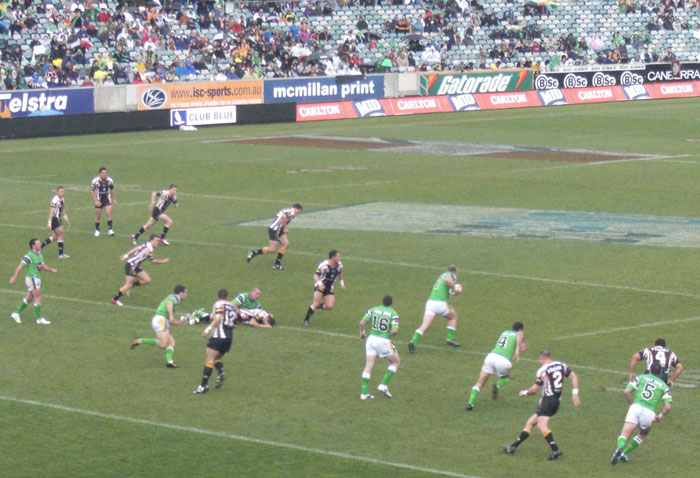

== Club Awards ==
Award	Winner
Player of the Year	Alan Tongue
Coaches Award	Clinton Schifcofske
Rookie of the Year	Adrian Purtell
Fred Daly Memorial Clubman of the Year Trophy	Jason Smith
Premier League Player of the Year	Ryan Hinchcliffe
Premier League Coaches Award	Bronx Goodwin
Jersey Flegg Player of the Year	Josh McCrone
Jersey Flegg Coaches Award	Nick Colley

== Season Ladder ==
2006 NRL season
Pos	Team	Pld	W	D	L	B	PF	PA	PD	Pts
1	Melbourne Storm	24	20	0	4	2	605	404	+201	44^{1}
2	Canterbury-Bankstown Bulldogs	24	16	0	8	2	608	468	+140	36
3	Brisbane Broncos (P)	24	14	0	10	2	497	392	+105	32
4	Newcastle Knights	24	14	0	10	2	608	538	+70	32
5	Manly Warringah Sea Eagles	24	14	0	10	2	534	493	+41	32
6	St George Illawarra Dragons	24	14	0	10	2	519	481	+38	32
7	Canberra Raiders	24	13	0	11	2	525	573	-48	30
8	Parramatta Eels	24	12	0	12	2	506	483	+23	28
9	North Queensland Cowboys	24	11	0	13	2	450	463	-13	26
10	New Zealand Warriors	24	12	0	12	2	552	463	+89	24^{2}
11	Wests Tigers	24	10	0	14	2	490	565	-75	24
12	Penrith Panthers	24	10	0	14	2	510	587	-77	24
13	Cronulla-Sutherland Sharks	24	9	0	15	2	515	544	-29	22
14	Sydney Roosters	24	8	0	16	2	528	650	-122	20
15	South Sydney Rabbitohs	24	3	0	21	2	429	772	-343	10

^{1} The Melbourne Storm were later stripped of this minor premiership due to gross salary cap breaches.
^{2} The New Zealand Warriors were deducted 4 competition points due to gross salary cap breaches.
