= 2006 Parramatta Eels season =

Australia Rugby League Parramatta Eels 2006 season

- NRL Rank: 8th
- Play-off result: Qualifying Finalists (Lost 6–12 vs Melbourne Storm, 4th Qualifying Final*)
- World Club Challenge: DNQ
- 2006 record: Wins: 12; draws: 0; losses: 12
- Points scored: For: 506; against: 483

Team information
- CEO: Denis Fitzgerald
- Coach: (Australia) Brian Smith (Round 1–9) (Australia) Jason Taylor (Interim, Round 10–Qualifying Final)
- Captain: (New Zealand) Nathan Cayless
- Stadium: Parramatta Stadium (Capacity: 20,741); Waikato Stadium (Capacity: 25,800)
- Avg. attendance: 14,587 (Home); 15,670 (Home & Away); 15,690 (Finals Series)
- Agg. attendance: 175,042 (Home); 376,073 (Home & Away); 15,690 (Finals Series)
- High attendance: 21,141 (21 April vs Wests Tigers, Round 7)

Top scorers
- Tries: (Australia) Jarryd Hayne (17)
- Goals: (Australia) Luke Burt (29)
- Points: (Australia) Luke Burt (76)
← 2005	List of seasons	2007 →

The 2006 Parramatta Eels season was the 60th in the club's history. Coached by Brian Smith and Jason Taylor and captained by Nathan Cayless, they competed in the NRL's 2006 Telstra Premiership.

== Summary ==
The Parramatta Eels began the 2006 season with the knowledge that their coach Brian Smith, would not be there next season, after being asked to step down by the management of the Parramatta Eels rugby league club in what turned out to be a direct trade with the Newcastle Knights club for their coach, Michael Hagan. However, Smith resigned officially on 15 May 2006, after an extremely poor start to the season, which left the Parramatta side running 14th and second-last.

Assistant coach and former Parramatta player, Jason Taylor, took over as caretaker manager for the rest of the year and led a Parramatta resurgence in the second half of the season to eventually reach eighth position by season's end including a nine-game winning streak. They were, however, eliminated by eventual runners-up Melbourne Storm in the first week of the finals, 6–12. Melbourne were later found guilty of wilful and deliberate breaches of the salary cap over a five-year period between 2006 and 2010.

== Standings ==
2006 NRL season
Pos	Team	Pld	W	D	L	B	PF	PA	PD	Pts
1	Melbourne Storm	24	20	0	4	2	605	404	+201	44^{1}
2	Canterbury-Bankstown Bulldogs	24	16	0	8	2	608	468	+140	36
3	Brisbane Broncos (P)	24	14	0	10	2	497	392	+105	32
4	Newcastle Knights	24	14	0	10	2	608	538	+70	32
5	Manly Warringah Sea Eagles	24	14	0	10	2	534	493	+41	32
6	St George Illawarra Dragons	24	14	0	10	2	519	481	+38	32
7	Canberra Raiders	24	13	0	11	2	525	573	-48	30
8	Parramatta Eels	24	12	0	12	2	506	483	+23	28
9	North Queensland Cowboys	24	11	0	13	2	450	463	-13	26
10	New Zealand Warriors	24	12	0	12	2	552	463	+89	24^{2}
11	Wests Tigers	24	10	0	14	2	490	565	-75	24
12	Penrith Panthers	24	10	0	14	2	510	587	-77	24
13	Cronulla-Sutherland Sharks	24	9	0	15	2	515	544	-29	22
14	Sydney Roosters	24	8	0	16	2	528	650	-122	20
15	South Sydney Rabbitohs	24	3	0	21	2	429	772	-343	10

^{1} The Melbourne Storm were later stripped of this minor premiership due to gross salary cap breaches.
^{2} The New Zealand Warriors were deducted 4 competition points due to gross salary cap breaches.

== Players and staff ==
The current playing squad and coaching staff of the Parramatta Eels for the 2006 NRL season as of 21 September 2006.

Parramatta Eels
First grade squad			Coaching staff
Wade McKinnon – FB; Luke Burt – WG; Jarryd Hayne – WG; Eric Grothe Jr. – WG; Luke O'Dwyer – CE; Ben Smith – CE; Timana Tahu – CE; John Morris – FE	Daniel Wagon – FE; Tim Smith – HB; Jeremy Smith – HB; Nathan Cayless (c) – PR; Paul Stringer – PR; Michael Vella – PR; Fuifui Moimoi – PR; PJ Marsh – HK	Mark Riddell – HK; Nathan Hindmarsh (vc) – SR; Chad Robinson – SR; Glenn Morrison (vc) – LK; Dean Widders – FE; Matthew Petersen – FB; Brett Delaney – WG; Josh Cordoba – PR	Head coach: Jason Taylor (interim); Legend: (c) Captain(s); (vc) Vice-captain(s)

== Awards ==
The following awards were awarded in the post-season:

- Michael Cronin Clubman of the Year Award: Chad Robinson
- Ken Thornett Medal (Players' Player): Nathan Hindmarsh
- Jack Gibson Award (Coach's Award): Nathan Cayless
- Eric Grothe Rookie of the Year Award: Jarryd Hayne
