= 2006 Wests Tigers season =

← 2005	2007 →

The 2006 Wests Tigers season was the seventh in the Wests Tigers joint-venture club's history. They competed in the National Rugby League's 2006 Telstra Premiership. They're based in based in the Inner West and Western Sydney.

== Pre-season ==
The Tigers played a trial game in Gunnedah against a local country side which they won easily. This was the only trial the team played before leaving for England to contest the 2006 World Club Challenge. This game pitted the 2005 NRL Premiers against Bradford who won the Super League title in 2005. The Tigers side were without many of the players from their grand final victory with notable absentees being Benji Marshall and Pat Richards. An early try to fill-in 5/8 Daniel Fitzhenry gave some hope but the Bulls dominated to eventually win 30-10.

Trial Results
v Combined Group 4 W 64-4 at Gunnedah (A)
v Bradford Bulls (Eng) L 10-30 at Huddersfield (A)
v Manly L 18-42 at Brookvale (A)

== Regular season ==
A series of close losses and a long list of injuries stymied the Tigers bid to defend their NRL premiership. In three games (Manly, Penrith, Newcastle) the Tigers led with less than 5 minutes to go only to concede late tries. In all three losses the game sealing tries came from kicks often involving freakish bounces or rebounds. Another two losses were from golden point (extra time) against Canberra, both in controversial circumstances. In the second game at Campbelltown the Daily Telegraph published a photograph showing Canberra players several metres offside which should have warranted a penalty. The referee Steven Clark later said he was reluctant to see a penalty decide the game. In the first game Tigers forward Todd Payten was penalised for a ball stripping offence with there being some debate whether a second player was involved.

The major injury loss was the star playmaker Benji Marshall. A cheekbone injury in round one was followed by another major shoulder injury against the Cowboys. These injuries meant Marshall played very little football. Captain and fullback Brett Hodgson missed the latter part of the season and Paul Whatuira also suffered long term injuries. One highlight was the successful debut of several players including Chris Lawrence and Ben Jeffery who starred in an upset win over eventual premiers Brisbane in Brisbane. The Tigers eventually missed the playoffs but would have made the finals had they won the close losses referred to above.

Round 1, v Dragons The St George Illawarra Dragons was the first assignment for the Tigers, and despite trailing 10-8 at halftime, the Tigers fought back with two tries to Paul Whatuira (who also scored the first try of the season proper) and s try to rookie Michael Crockett. All of the Dragons' tries had come from Mark Gasnier. The Wests Tigers won the match 24-15 after a late surge led by Marshall. It was later revealed Marshall had suffered a facial injury during the game.

Round 5, v Cowboys (2005 Grand Final Replay) The Tigers headed to Townsville four weeks later, and despite a 2-0 lead early, the Tigers trailed 22-2 at halftime. Not helping their cause was the sin binning of centre Paul Whatuira in the 35th minute for a professional foul on Cowboys' Justin Smith. After enduring a try-less first half, the Tigers' tries came from Benji Marshall (who was booked for a high shot on Smith) and Isaac de Gois, playing one of only five games for the Tigers. The Tigers lost 32-12.

Round 6, v Sharks The Tigers played their first home game at Campbelltown Stadium and thrashed the Cronulla Sharks who were missing skipper Brett Kimmorley who had injured his ankle in the previous week's 28-24 home loss to the Sydney Roosters. Brett Hodgson, playing in one of his finest games, broke the point-scoring record previously held by Joel Caine. The Tigers won the match 42-16, bringing them back on level terms for the season (3-3).

Round 14, v Sea Eagles Wests Tigers headed into this Friday night blockbuster at Brookvale Oval having won their last two games including a 44-4 thrashing of the South Sydney Rabbitohs in round 12 and a morale-boosting win over the Cowboys in round 13. They led 12-10 with moments to go until a Matt Orford banana kick was fielded by full-back Brett Stewart who juggled the ball and scored the match-winning try. This broke the hearts of the Wests Tigers, who were headed for victory.

Round 16, v Panthers With moments to go in the round 16 game at CUA Stadium, Benji Marshall painfully dislocated his shoulder whilst attempting a tackle on forward Frank Pritchard. The tackle ruled him out for the rest of the season and put the Tigers' premiership defence on tatters. The Tigers lost the game 24-20 after a Luke Lewis try sealed the game for the Panthers.

Round 21, v Broncos Heading into this game as huge underdogs, the Wests Tigers arrived at Suncorp Stadium and were without skipper Hodgson, five-eighth Marshall, centre Whatuira (who reinjured his hamstring during training), and forwards Gibbs and Fulton. But they were never headed. Rookies Ben Jeffery and Chris Lawrence made their debuts and marked them with memorable tries. Centre Dean Collis scored two tries as the Tigers won 20-6.

Round 26, v Rabbitohs Two traditional sides out of finals contention had something to play for at this Leichhardt Oval clash. Among those who played their last games in the Tigers colours included Anthony Laffranchi and Scott Prince (both Gold Coast Titans), John Skandalis and Shane Elford (both Huddersfield Giants). The Tigers were merciless, leading 30-0 at halftime and getting the job done in the second half, resulting in a 52-18 win.

=== Results ===
Wests Tigers 2006 Season Results
Round	Opponent	Result	Date	Venue	Crowd	Referee	Position/15
1	St. George Illawarra Dragons	Win	10 March 2006	Telstra Stadium (H)	27,865	Paul Simpkins	5th
1	St. George Illawarra Dragons	24 - Wests Tigers (Tries: Whatuira 3, Laffranchi, Crockett; Goals: Hodgson 2) 15 - Dragons (Tries: Gasnier 3; Goals: Naiqama; Fields Goals: Barrett)					5th
2	Bulldogs	Loss	17 March 2006	Telstra Stadium (A)	32,578	Steve Clark	11th
2	Bulldogs	47 - Bulldogs (Tries: El Masri 4, Mason, Patten, Maitua; Goals: El Masri 9; Field Goals: Sherwin)) 12 - Wests Tigers (Tries: Fitzhenry, Hodgson; Goals: Hodgson 2)					11th
3	New Zealand Warriors	Loss	25 March 2006	Jade Stadium (A)	14,675	Paul Simpkins	12th
3	New Zealand Warriors	26 - Warriors (Tries: Ropati, Webb, Toopi, Vatuvei, Guttenbeil; Goals: Martin 3) 10 - Wests Tigers (Tries: Crockett, Fitzhenry; Goals: Hodgson)					12th
4	Melbourne Storm	Win	2 April 2006	Leichhardt Oval (H)	17,803	Jason Robinson	11th
4	Melbourne Storm	30 - Wests Tigers (Tries: Fitzhenry 3, Elford 2, Laffranchi, Whatuira; Goals: Hodgson) 28 - Storm (Tries: Slater 2, Inglis, Hoffman, Cronk; Goals: C Smith 4)					11th
5	North Queensland Cowboys	Loss	7 April 2006	Dairy Farmers Stadium (A)	20,262	Steve Clark	11th
5	North Queensland Cowboys	32 - Cowboys (Tries: Jensen 2, Sing, Cooper, Thurston; Goals: Thurston 6) 12 - Wests Tigers (Tries: Marshall, de Gois; Goals: Hodgson 2)					11th
6	Cronulla Sharks	Win	16 April 2006	Campbelltown Stadium (H)	15,550	Jason Robinson	10th
6	Cronulla Sharks	42 - Wests Tigers (Tries: Whatuira 2, Crockett 2, Trimarchi, Galea, O'Hara; Goals: Hodgson 6, Prince) 16 - (Tries: Kearney, Simmons, Vagana; Goals: Covell 2)					10th
7	Parramatta Eels	Loss	21 April 2006	Parramatta Stadium (A)	21,141	Tony Archer	12th
7	Parramatta Eels	28 - Eels (Tries: Tahu, Robinson, Morrison, T Smith; Goals: Delaney 6) 16 - Wests Tigers (Tries: Whatuira, Collis, McDonnell; Goals: Prince 2)					12th
8	Bye						11th
9	Manly-Warringah Sea Eagles	Win	7 May 2006	Leichhardt Oval (H)	20,231	Russell Smith	8th
9	Manly-Warringah Sea Eagles	24 - Wests Tigers (Tries: Payten, Fitzhenry, Prince, Collis; Goals: Hodgson 4) 18 - Sea Eagles (Tries: Menzies, Monaghan, Bell, Stephenson; Goals: Orford)					8th
10	Newcastle Knights	Loss	14 May 2006	Campbelltown Stadium (H)	14,499	Sean Hampstead	10th
10	Newcastle Knights	16 - Wests Tigers (Tries: Fitzhenry, Elford, Heighington; Goals: Hodgson 2) 18 - Knights (Tries: Seage, Simpson, Carney; Goals: Johns 3)					10th
11	New Zealand Warriors	Loss	20 May 2006	Mt Smart Stadium (A)	8,210	Jarrad Maxwell	11th
11	New Zealand Warriors	34 - Warriors (Tries: Faumuina, Webb, Mannering, Rovelli, L Anderson, Tuimavave; Goals: Martin 5) 12 - Wests Tigers (Tries: Tuiaki 2; Goals: Marshall 2)					11th
12	South Sydney Rabbitohs	Win	28 May 2006	Telstra Stadium (A)	13,460	Paul Simpkins	10th
12	South Sydney Rabbitohs	4 - Rabbitohs (Tries: Merritt) 44 - Wests Tigers (Tries: Prince 3, Farah, Collis, Heighington, Tuiaki, Hodgson; Goals: Hodgson 6)					10th
13	North Queensland Cowboys	Win	4 June 2006	Telstra Stadium (H)	15,736	Steve Clark	9th
13	North Queensland Cowboys	24 - Wests Tigers (Tries: Collis, Marshall, Laffranchi, Crockett; Goals: Hodgson 4) 14 - Cowboys (Tries: Bowman, Cooper, Thurston; Goals: Thurston)					9th
14	Manly-Warringah Sea Eagles	Loss	9 June 2006	Brookvale Oval (A)	11,588	Shayne Hayne	10th
14	Manly-Warringah Sea Eagles	16 - Sea Eagles (Tries: B Stewart, Matai, Hicks; Goals: Burns 2) 12 - Wests Tigers (Tries: Crockett, Laffranchi; Goals: Marshall 2)					10th
15	Sydney Roosters	Win	17 June 2006	Telstra Stadium (H)	19,360	Gavin Badger	9th
15	Sydney Roosters	26 - Wests Tigers (Tries: Galea, Farah, Marshall, Crockett, Collis; Goals: Hodgson 3) 14 - Roosters (Tries: Foley, Cross, Flannery; Goals: Fitzgibbon)					9th
16	Penrith Panthers	Loss	24 June 2006	CUA Stadium (A)	16,120	Russell Smith	10th
16	Penrith Panthers	24 - Panthers (Tries: Gordon, Galea, Lewis, Campbell; Goals: Campbell 4) 20 - Wests Tigers (Tries: McDonnell 2, Heighington, Galea; Goals: Hodgson 2)					10th
17	Bulldogs	Loss	2 July 2006	Telstra Stadium (H)	22,511	Paul Simpkins	10th
17	Bulldogs	10 - Wests Tigers (Tries: Chase, Tuikai; Goals: Prince) 32 - Bulldogs (Tries: Patten, Tonga, Hickey, Ryan, El Masri; Goals: El Masri 6)					10th
18	Cronulla Sharks	Win	9 July 2006	Toyota Park (A)	15,070	Steve Clark	9th
18	Cronulla Sharks	10 - Sharks (Tries: Kingston; Goals: Covell 3) 22 - Wests Tigers (Tries: Elford, Collis, Fitzhenry, Galea; Goals: Hodgson 3)					9th
19	Canberra Raiders	Loss	16 July 2006	Bruce Stadium (A)	9,125	Tony Archer	11th
19	Canberra Raiders	20 - Raiders (Tries: Graham, Chalk, Carney; Goals: Schifcofske 4) 18 - Wests Tigers (Tries: McDonnell, Collis, Hodgson; Goals: Hodgson 3) in golden point extra time.					11th
20	Parramatta Eels	Loss	23 July 2006	Telstra Stadium (H)	21,456	Shayne Hayne	12th
20	Parramatta Eels	6 - Wests Tigers (Tries: Farah; Goals: Prince) 34 - Eels (Tries: Hayne 2, N Hindmarsh, J Smith, O'Dwyer, McKinnon; Goals: Riddell 4, Hayne)					12th
21	Brisbane Broncos	Win	30 July 2006	Lang Park (A)	31,500	Paul Simpkins	12th
21	Brisbane Broncos	6 - Broncos (Tries: Webcke; Goals: Lockyer) 20 - Wests Tigers (Tries: Collis 2, Jeffery, Lawrence; Goals: Prince 2)					12th
22	Melbourne Storm	Loss	5 August 2006	Olympic Park Stadium (A)	12,481	Sean Hampstead	12th
22	Melbourne Storm	46 - Storm (Tries: Webster 4, Turner 2, Geyer, Inglis; Goals: C Smith 6, Inglis) 4 - Wests Tigers (Tries: Lolesi)					12th
23	Canberra Raiders	Loss	13 August 2006	Campbelltown Stadium (H)	18,474	Steve Clark	14th
23	Canberra Raiders	18 - Wests Tigers (Tries: Fitzhenry, Heighington, Prince; Goals: Prince 3) 19 - Raiders (Tries: Graham, Mogg, Tongue; Goals: Schifcofske 3; Field Goals: Carney) in golden point extra time.					14th
24	St. George Illawarra Dragons	Loss	20 August 2006	Oki Jubilee Stadium (A)	14,211	Shayne Hayne	14th
24	St. George Illawarra Dragons	46 - Dragons (Tries: Gasnier 3, B Morris 2, Greenshields, Bickerstaff, Gorrell, Naiqama; Goals: Gorrell 3, Naiqama 2) 16 - Wests Tigers (Tries: Lawrence, Farah, Heighington; Goals: Prince 2)					14th
25	Bye						13th
26	South Sydney Rabbitohs	Win	3 September 2006	Leichhardt Oval (H)	18,440	Tony de las Heras	11th
26	South Sydney Rabbitohs	52 - Wests Tigers (Tries: Heighington 2, Fitzhenry 2, Farah, Payten, Elford, McDonnell, Skandalis; Goals: Prince 8) 18 - Rabbitohs (Tries: Gordon, Geddes, Peachey; Goals: Paea, Williams, Merritt)					11th

== Players ==
No.

Position
Player

Brett Hodgson (captain) – FB Shannon McDonnell – FB Daniel Fitzhenry – WG Jason Moodie – WG Shane Elford – WG Michael Crockett – WG (Debut: Round 1) Jamahl Lolesi – WG Taniela Tuiaki – WG (Debut: Round 11) Chris Lawrence – CE (Debut: Round 21) Dean Collis – CE Paul Whatuira – CE Ben Jeffery – CE (Debut: Round 21) Keith Eshman – CE (Debut: Round 22) Benji Marshall – FE Scott Prince – HB Ben Reynolds – HB

No.

Position
Player

Bryce Gibbs – PR Ryan O'Hara – PR (Debut: Round 1) John Skandalis – PR Todd Payten – PR Anthony Laffranchi – PR Jarrod Saffy – PR (Debut: Round 26) Robbie Farah – HK Stuart Flanagan – HK (Debut: Round 3) Isaac de Gois – HK (Debut: Round 3) Rangi Chase – HK (Debut: Round 17) Keith Galloway – SR (Debut: Round 1) Dene Halatau – SR Bronson Harrison – SR Tevita Metuisela – SR (Debut: Round 21) Sam Harris – SR Rocky Trimarchi – SR (Debut: Round 6) Liam Fulton – LK Ben Galea – LK Chris Heighington – LK

=== Ladder ===
2006 NRL season
Pos	Team	Pld	W	D	L	B	PF	PA	PD	Pts
1	Melbourne Storm	24	20	0	4	2	605	404	+201	44^{1}
2	Canterbury-Bankstown Bulldogs	24	16	0	8	2	608	468	+140	36
3	Brisbane Broncos (P)	24	14	0	10	2	497	392	+105	32
4	Newcastle Knights	24	14	0	10	2	608	538	+70	32
5	Manly Warringah Sea Eagles	24	14	0	10	2	534	493	+41	32
6	St George Illawarra Dragons	24	14	0	10	2	519	481	+38	32
7	Canberra Raiders	24	13	0	11	2	525	573	-48	30
8	Parramatta Eels	24	12	0	12	2	506	483	+23	28
9	North Queensland Cowboys	24	11	0	13	2	450	463	-13	26
10	New Zealand Warriors	24	12	0	12	2	552	463	+89	24^{2}
11	Wests Tigers	24	10	0	14	2	490	565	-75	24
12	Penrith Panthers	24	10	0	14	2	510	587	-77	24
13	Cronulla-Sutherland Sharks	24	9	0	15	2	515	544	-29	22
14	Sydney Roosters	24	8	0	16	2	528	650	-122	20
15	South Sydney Rabbitohs	24	3	0	21	2	429	772	-343	10

^{1} The Melbourne Storm were later stripped of this minor premiership due to gross salary cap breaches.
^{2} The New Zealand Warriors were deducted 4 competition points due to gross salary cap breaches.

== Team Season statistics ==
Overall: Played 24 Won 10 Lost 14 Competition Points 24 (11th) Points For 490 Against 565
Home: Played 12 Won 7 Lost 5
(Leichhardt Oval - Won 3 Lost 0)
(Campbelltown Stadium - Won 1 Lost 2)
(Telstra Stadium (Won 3 Lost 2)
(Jade Stadium NZ Won 0 Lost 1)
Away: Played 12 Won 3 Lost 9
Golden Point: Played 2 Lost 2
Highest Position: 5th (Rd 1)
Lowest Position: 14th (Rd 21)
Biggest Win: 44-4 v South Sydney (A) Rd 12 (highest score 52 v South Sydney (H) Rd 26)
Worst Defeat: 4-46 v Melbourne (A) Rd 22 (most points conceded 47 v Bulldogs (A) Rd 2)
Home Crowd Average: 18 883 (LO 18 824)

== Individual statistics ==
Most tries: Daniel Fitzhenry (11)
Most points: Brett Hodgson (94)
