= 2006 South Sydney Rabbitohs season =

- NRL rank: First Grade

Team information
- CEO: (Australia)
- Coach: (Australia) Shaun McRae
- Captain: (Australia)
- Stadium: Telstra Stadium

Top scorers
- Tries: (Australia)
- Goals: (Australia)
- Points: (Australia)
← 2005	2007 →

The 2005 South Sydney Rabbitohs season was the 97th in the club's history. Coached by Shaun McRae and captained by Peter Cusack, they competed in the National Rugby League's 2006 Telstra Premiership, finishing the regular season in last place, and collecting their eighth (and to date most recent) wooden spoon.

Souths acquired many sound players for 2006 including Joe Galuvao, Stuart Webb, Jaiman Lowe and Ben Rogers. They also re-signed key five-eighth/lock John Sutton for several years.

Despite coming close, Souths were yet to score a win after round ten but had shown significant progress. One area of weakness nominated by fans included the half back position. An injury to regular half-back Ben Walker took a heavy toll on the team's performance. Players who have made a big impact in a losing side included David Fa'alogo (a New Zealand International) and Nathan Merritt. Merritt finished the season as the NRL's leading try scorer with 22 tries.

David Peachey came to the club after being sacked by his English club Widnes. On 11 June 2006, in his second match for the Rabbitohs, Peachey steered the bottom of the table Souths to their first win of the 2006 season with a commanding 34-14 win over the second placed Brisbane Broncos. This was Souths first win over the Broncos since 1989.

On 25 June Souths suffered their worst defeat ever, going down 66-0 to the New Zealand Warriors at Telstra Stadium. In a rare move, this catastrophic result moved the club to make a full and unreserved apology to their fans through the nation's press, in direct letters to members and through the electronic media. Souths finished the season in last place.

On 30 August 2006 Jason Taylor was appointed head coach in place of Shaun McRae for seasons 2007 and 2008.

== Ladder ==
2006 NRL season
Pos	Team	Pld	W	D	L	B	PF	PA	PD	Pts
1	Melbourne Storm	24	20	0	4	2	605	404	+201	44^{1}
2	Canterbury-Bankstown Bulldogs	24	16	0	8	2	608	468	+140	36
3	Brisbane Broncos (P)	24	14	0	10	2	497	392	+105	32
4	Newcastle Knights	24	14	0	10	2	608	538	+70	32
5	Manly Warringah Sea Eagles	24	14	0	10	2	534	493	+41	32
6	St George Illawarra Dragons	24	14	0	10	2	519	481	+38	32
7	Canberra Raiders	24	13	0	11	2	525	573	-48	30
8	Parramatta Eels	24	12	0	12	2	506	483	+23	28
9	North Queensland Cowboys	24	11	0	13	2	450	463	-13	26
10	New Zealand Warriors	24	12	0	12	2	552	463	+89	24^{2}
11	Wests Tigers	24	10	0	14	2	490	565	-75	24
12	Penrith Panthers	24	10	0	14	2	510	587	-77	24
13	Cronulla-Sutherland Sharks	24	9	0	15	2	515	544	-29	22
14	Sydney Roosters	24	8	0	16	2	528	650	-122	20
15	South Sydney Rabbitohs	24	3	0	21	2	429	772	-343	10

^{1} The Melbourne Storm were later stripped of this minor premiership due to gross salary cap breaches.
^{2} The New Zealand Warriors were deducted 4 competition points due to gross salary cap breaches.

== Player statistics ==
Player	Appearances	Tries	Goals	Field Goals	Total Points
–	–	–	–	–	–

== Representative Honours ==
Player	All Stars	ANZAC Test	Pacific Test	City / Country	State of Origin 1	State of Origin 2	State of Origin 3	Four Nations
