= 2006 New Zealand Warriors season =

- NRL rank: 10th
- 2006 record: Wins: 12; draws: 0; losses: 12
- Points scored: For: 552; against: 463

Team information
- CEO: Wayne Scurrah
- Coach: Ivan Cleary
- Assistant coach: John Ackland
- Captains: Steve Price; Ruben Wiki (4)
- Stadium: Ericsson Stadium
- Avg. attendance: 8,829

Top scorers
- Tries: Brent Webb (11)
- Goals: Tony Martin (68)
- Points: Tony Martin (160)
← 2005	2007 →

The 2006 New Zealand Warriors season was the 12th in the club's history. The club competed in Australasia's National Rugby League. The coach of the team was Ivan Cleary while Steve Price was the club captain.

== Milestones ==
- 25 March - Round 3: Awen Guttenbeil played in his 150th match for the club.
- 25 June - Round 16: The Warriors defeated the South Sydney Rabbitohs 66–0 at Telstra Stadium. This result stands as the Warriors largest victory to date.
- 9 July - Round 18: Jerome Ropati played in his 50th match for the club.
- 9 July - Round 18: Louis Anderson played in his 50th match for the club.
- 12 August - Round 23: Brent Webb played in his 100th match for the club.

== Salary cap breach ==
Before the season started the Warriors were investigated by the National Rugby League over alleged salary cap breaches committed by the team's previous administrators. The club admitted to inflating its salary cap to the tune of nearly $1 million during the 2005 season. As punishment, the National Rugby League fined the Warriors club $430,000 and stripped the team of four competition points prior to the beginning of the season. It was the first time in 99 years of rugby league in Australia that a team has started a season on less than zero premiership points.

The Warriors appealed the decision by the NRL to strip the four competition points but accepted the financial penalty. Prior to the beginning of the season, the National Rugby League confirmed that the points penalty would stand. The penalty would prove the decisive factor in the Warriors missing the finals for the third year in succession.

== Jersey and sponsors ==

The Warriors adopted a new home jersey for 2006, a predominantly Black & White design supplied by Puma AG. A new away jersey was also adopted, being mainly Grey with Black details.

== Fixtures ==
The Warriors used Ericsson Stadium as their home ground in 2006, their only home ground since they entered the competition in 1995. On 12 July, the stadium reverted to its original name: Mt Smart Stadium.

=== Pre-Season ===
Date	Round	Opponent	Venue	Result	Score	Tries	Goals	Attendance	Report
12 February	Trial 1	Canberra Raiders	North Harbour Stadium, Auckland	Loss	16 - 28	Todd Byrne, Tony Martin, Cooper Vuna	Martin (2)	11,000	
18 February	Trial 2	North Queensland Cowboys	Barlow Park, Cairns	Loss	10 - 26	Manu Vatuvei, George Tuakura	Martin (1)	15,000	
25 February	Trial 3	Bulldogs	Carrara Stadium, Gold Coast	Win	24 - 20	Nathan Fien, Ruben Wiki, Tony Martin, Jerome Ropati	Martin (4)	12,380	

=== Regular season ===
Date	Round	Opponent	Venue	Result	Score	Tries	Goals	Attendance	Report
12 March	Round 1	Melbourne Storm	Ericsson Stadium, Auckland	Loss	16 - 22	Koopu, Vatuvei, Ropati	Martin (2)	10,035	
18 March	Round 2	Parramatta Eels	Waikato Stadium, Hamilton	Loss	14 - 22	Tuimavave, Vatuvei	Martin (3)	16,089	
25 March	Round 3	Wests Tigers	AMI Stadium, Christchurch	Win	26 - 10	Guttenbeil, Ropati, Toopi, Webb, Vatuvei	Martin (3)	14,675	
2 April	Round 4	Newcastle Knights	EnergyAustralia Stadium, Newcastle	Win	26 - 22	Fien, Rovelli, Tuimavave, Vatuvei	Martin (5)	18,359	
9 April	Round 5	Manly Sea Eagles	Ericsson Stadium, Auckland	Loss	8 - 22	Martin (2)		7,888	
15 April	Round 6	Canberra Raiders	Canberra Stadium, Canberra	Loss	14 - 18	Koopu, Webb	Martin (3)	7,174	
22 April	Round 7	South Sydney Rabbitohs	Ericsson Stadium, Auckland	Win	46 - 14	Wiki (2), Byrne, Gatis, Martin, Price, Webb	Martin (9)	8,015	
30 April	Round 8	Bulldogs	Ericsson Stadium, Auckland	Loss	16 - 30	Faumuina, Koopu	Martin (4)	11,604	
	Round 9	Bye							
13 May	Round 10	St. George Illawarra Dragons	WIN Stadium, Illawarra	Loss	16 - 22	Mannering, Price, Webb	Martin (2)	10,117	
20 May	Round 11	Wests Tigers	Ericsson Stadium, Auckland	Win	34 - 12	Anderson, Faumuina, Mannering, Rovelli, Tuimavave, Webb	Martin (5)	8,210	
27 May	Round 12	Cronulla Sharks	Toyota Park, Sydney	Loss	20 - 34	Koopu (2), Mannering, Faumuina	Martin (2)	9,490	
4 June	Round 13	Brisbane Broncos	Ericsson Stadium, Auckland	Loss	18 - 23	Wiki (2), Ah Van	Martin (3)	7,746	
11 June	Round 14	Sydney Roosters	Sydney Football Stadium, Sydney	Win	22 - 12	Vatuvei (2), Fien, Martin, Webb	Martin (1)	6,806	
18 June	Round 15	Newcastle Knights	Ericsson Stadium, Auckland	Win	30 - 18	Fien (2), Faumuina, Price, Ropati	Martin (5)	6,240	
25 June	Round 16	South Sydney Rabbitohs	Telstra Stadium, Sydney	Win	66 - 0	Hohaia (3), Ropati (2), Webb (2), Ah Van, Mannering, Martin, Price, Tuimavave	Martin (9)	6,597	
1 July	Round 17	Penrith Panthers	Ericsson Stadium, Auckland	Win	28 - 22	Mannering (2), Martin, Webb, Wiki	Martin (4)	8,723	
9 July	Round 18	Bulldogs	Telstra Stadium, Sydney	Loss	18 - 22 (a.e.t)	Koopu, Mannering, Vatuvei	Martin (3)	14,076	
15 July	Round 19	Parramatta Eels	Mt Smart Stadium, Auckland	Loss	12 - 20	Price, Rovelli	Martin (2)	14,499	
	Round 20	Bye							
29 July	Round 21	Penrith Panthers	CUA Stadium, Sydney	Loss	6 - 36	Vautvei	Martin (1)	9,725	
5 August	Round 22	Cronulla Sharks	Mt Smart Stadium, Auckland	Win	12 - 10	Luck, Rovelli	Martin (2)	4,850	
12 August	Round 23	North Queensland Cowboys	Mt Smart Stadium, Auckland	Win	26 - 0	Hohaia (2), Mannering, Rapira, Vatuvei	Hohaia (3)	5,425	
19 August	Round 24	Melbourne Storm	Olympic Park Stadium, Melbourne	Win	24 - 20	Webb (2), Mannering, Vatuvei	Hohaia (4)	13,477	
27 August	Round 25	Sydney Roosters	Mt Smart Stadium, Auckland	Win	42 - 16	Ropati (4), Ah Van (2), Lauaki, Wiki	Hohaia (5)	12,711	
3 September	Round 26	Brisbane Broncos	Suncorp Stadium, Brisbane	Loss	12 - 36	Byrne, Rovelli	Hohaia (2)	47,193	

== Ladder ==
2006 NRL season
Pos	Team	Pld	W	D	L	B	PF	PA	PD	Pts
1	Melbourne Storm	24	20	0	4	2	605	404	+201	44^{1}
2	Canterbury-Bankstown Bulldogs	24	16	0	8	2	608	468	+140	36
3	Brisbane Broncos (P)	24	14	0	10	2	497	392	+105	32
4	Newcastle Knights	24	14	0	10	2	608	538	+70	32
5	Manly Warringah Sea Eagles	24	14	0	10	2	534	493	+41	32
6	St George Illawarra Dragons	24	14	0	10	2	519	481	+38	32
7	Canberra Raiders	24	13	0	11	2	525	573	-48	30
8	Parramatta Eels	24	12	0	12	2	506	483	+23	28
9	North Queensland Cowboys	24	11	0	13	2	450	463	-13	26
10	New Zealand Warriors	24	12	0	12	2	552	463	+89	24^{2}
11	Wests Tigers	24	10	0	14	2	490	565	-75	24
12	Penrith Panthers	24	10	0	14	2	510	587	-77	24
13	Cronulla-Sutherland Sharks	24	9	0	15	2	515	544	-29	22
14	Sydney Roosters	24	8	0	16	2	528	650	-122	20
15	South Sydney Rabbitohs	24	3	0	21	2	429	772	-343	10

^{1} The Melbourne Storm were later stripped of this minor premiership due to gross salary cap breaches.
^{2} The New Zealand Warriors were deducted 4 competition points due to gross salary cap breaches.

== Squad ==
Twenty five players were used by the Warriors in 2006, including several players who made their first grade debuts.

No.	Name	Nationality	Position	Warriors debut	App	T	G	FG	Pts
33	Awen Guttenbeil	(New Zealand)	SR	14 April 1996	23	1	0	0	4
64	Wairangi Koopu	(New Zealand)	CE / SR	9 April 1999	20	6	0	0	24
66	Clinton Toopi	(New Zealand)	CE	2 May 1999	10	1	0	0	4
87	Richard Villasanti	(Australia)	PR	18 February 2001	1	0	0	0	0
97	Brent Webb	(New Zealand)	FB	1 April 2002	22	11	0	0	44
98	Sione Faumuina	(New Zealand)	CE / LK	1 April 2002	17	4	0	0	16
99	Lance Hohaia	(New Zealand)	UB	6 April 2002	12	5	14	0	48
102	Evarn Tuimavave	(New Zealand)	PR	1 September 2002	23	4	0	0	16
108	Jerome Ropati	(New Zealand)	CE / FE	31 August 2003	22	9	0	0	36
109	Tony Martin	(Australia)	CE	14 March 2004	20	6	68	0	160
110	Epalahame Lauaki	(New Zealand)	SR	14 March 2004	8	1	0	0	4
112	Louis Anderson	(New Zealand)	LK	28 March 2004	23	1	0	0	4
115	Manu Vatuvei	(New Zealand)	WG	23 May 2004	18	10	0	0	40
118	Cooper Vuna	(New Zealand)	WG	21 August 2004	3	0	0	0	0
121	Steve Price	(Australia)	PR	13 March 2005	21	5	0	0	20
122	Todd Byrne	(Australia)	WG	13 March 2005	9	2	0	0	8
123	Ruben Wiki	(New Zealand)	PR	13 March 2005	22	6	0	0	24
124	Nathan Fien	(New Zealand)	HK	13 March 2005	21	4	0	0	16
125	Simon Mannering	(New Zealand)	CE	26 June 2005	17	9	0	0	36
126	Micheal Luck	(Australia)	SR	12 March 2006	24	1	0	0	4
127	Grant Rovelli	(Italy)	HB	12 March 2006	24	4	0	0	16
128	George Gatis	(Greece)	HK	25 March 2006	17	2	0	0	8
129	Patrick Ah Van	(New Zealand)	WG	9 April 2006	15	4	0	0	16
130	Misi Taulapapa	(Samoa)	WG	22 April 2006	5	0	0	0	0
131	Sam Rapira	(New Zealand)	PR	20 May 2006	10	1	0	0	4

== Staff ==
- Chief Executive Officer: Wayne Scurrah

=== Coaching staff ===
- Head coach: Ivan Cleary
- Assistant coach: John Ackland
- Development coach: Tony Iro
- Trainer: Craig Walker

== Transfers ==
=== Gains ===
Player	Previous club	Length	Notes
Micheal Luck	North Queensland Cowboys		
Grant Rovelli	Sydney Roosters		
George Gatis	North Queensland Cowboys		

=== Losses ===
Player	Club	Notes
Stacey Jones	Catalans Dragons	
Monty Betham	Wakefield Trinity Wildcats	
Francis Meli	St Helens R.F.C.	
Iafeta Paleaaesina	Wigan Warriors	
Karl Temata	Harlequins RL	
Tevita Latu	Cronulla Sharks	

=== Mid-Season Losses ===
Player	Club	Notes
Richard Villasanti	Cronulla Sharks	granted an early release on 3 May after 96 appearances for the Warriors since arriving in 2001.
Clinton Toopi	Leeds Rhinos	granted an early release on 17 July.
Sione Faumuina	Harlequins RL	contract terminated by the Warriors on 30 Augustafter another case of serious misconduct.

== Awards ==
- 14 September – Steve Price wins the club's premier accolade as the Lion Red Player of the Year. Grant Rovelli wins the Vodafone Young Player of the Year, Micheal Luck the Puma Clubman of the Year and Brent Webb the Vodafone One Tribe Supporters' Player of the Year.

== Other teams ==
Players not required by the Warriors were released to play in the 2006 Bartercard Cup. These included Misi Taulapapa for the Mount Albert Lions and Cooper Vuna for the Tamaki Titans. Sam Rapira and Lance Hohaia both made appearances for the Waicoa Bay Stallions while Richard Villasanti played for the Canterbury Bulls.
