= 2006 Manly Warringah Sea Eagles season =

← 2005	2007 →

The 2006 Manly Warringah Sea Eagles season was the 60th in the club's history. Coached by Des Hasler and captained by Ben Kennedy, competed in the National Rugby League's 2006 Telstra Premiership. The Sea Eagles finished the regular season 5th (out of 15), reaching the finals where they were knocked out in the second week by the St. George Illawarra Dragons.

Season 2006, its 60th season in the competition, saw an average season in which the Manly side again advanced to the finals, finishing fifth. For this season only, a commemorative 60th anniversary logo was used on the player jerseys. Despite losing their first two matches of the season (both by small margins) the Sea Eagles built on their 2005 season to once again advance to the play-offs. Highlights in the season included wins over the Roosters in round 4, the Bulldogs in round 7, the Storm in round 11 and a last-minute win over the defending premiers Wests Tigers in round 14 in which Brett Stewart scored a spectacular try in the last five minutes.

In an away final against the Newcastle Knights, the Sea Eagles led at halftime only to see their lead run down in a controversial second half. Although they did advance a week further, the Sea Eagles' season ended with a 28–0 shutout at the hands of the St. George Illawarra Dragons. That match also marked Ben Kennedy's final game after two years in Manly colours.

At the 2006 Dally M Awards Manly's Ben Kennedy, who will retire at the end of the season, was named lock and captain of the year.

== Ladder ==
2006 NRL season
Pos	Team	Pld	W	D	L	B	PF	PA	PD	Pts
1	Melbourne Storm	24	20	0	4	2	605	404	+201	44^{1}
2	Canterbury-Bankstown Bulldogs	24	16	0	8	2	608	468	+140	36
3	Brisbane Broncos (P)	24	14	0	10	2	497	392	+105	32
4	Newcastle Knights	24	14	0	10	2	608	538	+70	32
5	Manly Warringah Sea Eagles	24	14	0	10	2	534	493	+41	32
6	St George Illawarra Dragons	24	14	0	10	2	519	481	+38	32
7	Canberra Raiders	24	13	0	11	2	525	573	-48	30
8	Parramatta Eels	24	12	0	12	2	506	483	+23	28
9	North Queensland Cowboys	24	11	0	13	2	450	463	-13	26
10	New Zealand Warriors	24	12	0	12	2	552	463	+89	24^{2}
11	Wests Tigers	24	10	0	14	2	490	565	-75	24
12	Penrith Panthers	24	10	0	14	2	510	587	-77	24
13	Cronulla-Sutherland Sharks	24	9	0	15	2	515	544	-29	22
14	Sydney Roosters	24	8	0	16	2	528	650	-122	20
15	South Sydney Rabbitohs	24	3	0	21	2	429	772	-343	10

^{1} The Melbourne Storm were later stripped of this minor premiership due to gross salary cap breaches.
^{2} The New Zealand Warriors were deducted 4 competition points due to gross salary cap breaches.
