= Lufi Manua =

Australian rugby league footballer

Personal information
- Full name: Lufi Manua
- Born: 26 March 1978 (age 47)

Playing information
- Position: Second-row
Club
| Years | Team | Pld | T | G | FG | P |
|---|---|---|---|---|---|---|
| 2006 | Sydney Roosters | 2 | 0 | 0 | 0 | 0 |
- Source: As of 31 October 2023

Lufi Manua (born 26 March 1978) is an Australian former professional rugby league footballer who played for the Sydney Roosters of the National Rugby League. His choice of position was at Second-Row.

== Playing career ==
Manua made his first grade debut on ANZAC day against St. George Illawarra in round 7 of the 2006 NRL season in a losing side. He started the game at Second-Row. He also played the following week in Townsville against North Queensland; once again starting in the Second-Row. The Sydney Roosters won the game 22–18.
