= 2006 NRL season =

Rugby league competition

2006 National Rugby League
- Teams: 15
- Premiers: Brisbane Broncos (6th title)
- Minor premiers: None
- Matches played: 189
- Points scored: 8201
- Average attendance: 16,485
- Total attendance: 3,115,700
- Top points scorer: Hazem El Masri (296)
- Wooden spoon: South Sydney Rabbitohs (8th spoon)
- Dally M Medal: Cameron Smith
- Top try-scorer: Nathan Merritt (22)

The 2006 NRL season was the 99th season of professional rugby league football in Australia and the ninth run by the National Rugby League. The lineup of teams remained unchanged from the previous year, with fifteen clubs competing for the 2006 Telstra Premiership. Throughout the 26 rounds of the regular season, ten teams from New South Wales (9 of them from the Sydney basin), two from Queensland and one each from Victoria, the ACT and New Zealand competed for the minor premiership. Eight of these teams qualified for the four-week finals series, with the Brisbane Broncos eventual victors over the Melbourne Storm in the grand final. Melbourne finished the regular season first so were awarded the minor premiership, but this was later revoked due to the Melbourne Storm salary cap breach. The decision was then made to award no minor premiership for the season.

== Preseason ==
- Newcastle Knights coach Michael Hagan signed a three-year deal to coach the Parramatta Eels, beginning in 2007. Hagan replaced Brian Smith, who had coached the Eels since 1997 whilst Smith replaced Hagan at Newcastle in an unprecedented coach-swap. In other coaching moves, Matthew Elliott was confirmed as the coach of the Penrith Panthers, beginning in 2007.
- Penrith Panthers halfback Craig Gower was fired as captain, suspended for four games and fined $100,000 ($90,000 to be paid to an NRL programme encouraging the responsible use of alcohol by league players and $10,000 to replace a destroyed golf cart) after a string of alcohol-fueled incidents at a charity golf function.
- The Charity Shield heralded the unofficial start of the season, with the South Sydney Rabbitohs defeating St George Illawarra 14-12 in their first home game at Telstra Stadium on February 18. All NRL clubs engaged in a series of trials during the month of February.
- Wests Tigers premiership-winning captain Scott Prince announced on March 3 he had signed a four-year deal with expansion team Gold Coast Titans, beginning in 2007. Prince relinquished the captaincy of the Tigers for the 2006 season.

=== New Zealand Warriors salary cap breach ===
The salary cap for the 2006 season was A$3.366 million per club for their 25 highest-paid players. The New Zealand Warriors were investigated by the National Rugby League over alleged salary cap breaches committed by the team's previous administrators. The club admitted to inflating its salary cap to the tune of nearly $1 million during the 2005 season. The National Rugby League fined the Warriors $430,000 and ordered the team to start the season with a four premiership point deficit. It was the first time in 99 years of rugby league in Australia that a team has started a season on less than zero premiership points.

The Warriors appealed the decision by the NRL to deduct the four competition points but accepted the financial penalty. Prior to the beginning of the season, the National Rugby League confirmed that the points penalty would stand. The penalty would prove the decisive factor in the Warriors missing the finals for the third year in succession.

=== Teams ===
Brisbane Broncos; 19th season Ground: Suncorp Stadium; Coach: Wayne Bennett; Captain: Darren Lockyer	Canterbury-Bankstown Bulldogs; 72nd season Ground: Telstra Stadium; Coach: Steve Folkes; Captain: Andrew Ryan	Canberra Raiders; 25th season Ground: Canberra Stadium; Coach: Matthew Elliott; Captain: Clinton Schifcofske	Cronulla-Sutherland Sharks; 40th season Ground: Toyota Stadium; Coach: Stuart Raper; Captain: Brett Kimmorley	Manly Warringah Sea Eagles; 57th season Ground: Brookvale Oval; Coach: Des Hasler; Captain: Ben Kennedy
Melbourne Storm; 9th season Ground Olympic Park Stadium; Coach: Craig Bellamy; Captain: various	New Zealand Warriors; 12th season Ground: Mt Smart Stadium; Coach: Ivan Cleary; Captain: Steve Price	Newcastle Knights; 19th season Ground: EnergyAustralia Stadium; Coach: Michael Hagan; Captain: Andrew Johns	North Queensland Cowboys; 12th season Ground: Dairy Farmers Stadium; Coach: Graham Murray; Captain: Travis Norton	Parramatta Eels; 60th season Ground: Parramatta Stadium; Coach: Brian Smith→Jason Taylor; Captain: Nathan Cayless
Penrith Panthers; 40th season Ground: CUA Stadium; Coach: John Lang; Captain: Tony Puletua	South Sydney Rabbitohs; 97th season Ground: Telstra Stadium; Coach: Shaun McRae; Captain: Peter Cusack	St. George Illawarra Dragons; 8th season Ground: OKI Jubilee Stadium & WIN Stadium; Coach: Nathan Brown; Captain: Trent Barrett	Sydney Roosters; 99th season Ground: Sydney Football Stadium; Coach: Ricky Stuart; Captain: Craig Fitzgibbon	Wests Tigers; 7th season Ground: Campbelltown Stadium & Leichhardt Oval; Coach: Tim Sheens; Captain: Brett Hodgson

== Season summary ==
The season began on March 10 with a match between defending premiers Wests Tigers and the St. George Illawarra Dragons, played at Telstra Stadium. The Melbourne Storm won 20 out of 24 regular season matches to win the minor premiership eight points clear of the Bulldogs. However, in April 2010, the Storm were retroactively stripped of their minor premiership as a result of salary cap breaches occurring over the course of the 2006, 2007, 2008, 2009 and 2010 seasons, with no minor premiers declared for the 2006 season, as well as the subsequent two seasons.

The grand finals:

- Brisbane Broncos vs Melbourne Storm (NRL)
- Parramatta Eels vs Newtown Jets (NSW Cup)
- Penrith Panthers vs Newcastle Knights (NSW Jersey Flegg Cup)

The winners in all grades were:

- Brisbane Broncos (NRL)
- Parramatta Eels (NSW Cup)
- Penrith Panthers (NSW Jersey Flegg Cup)

The test match

- Australia vs New Zealand

The tri-nations Series

- Australia vs New Zealand
- Australia vs Great Britain
- Great Britain vs New Zealand

The State Of Origin Series

- Queensland vs New South Wales

=== Venues ===
Sixteen stadiums regularly hosted National Rugby league matches, with a further six hosting at least one match in season 2006.

Stadium name	City	Host club(s)	Capacity
Suncorp Stadium	Milton, Brisbane, Qld	Brisbane Broncos	52,500
Canberra Stadium	Bruce, Canberra, ACT	Canberra Raiders	25,000
Olympic Park Stadium	Melbourne, Vic	Melbourne Storm	18,500
EnergyAustralia Stadium	Newcastle, NSW	Newcastle Knights	26,200
Sydney Football Stadium	Moore Park, Sydney, NSW	Sydney Roosters	41,159
Brookvale Oval	Brookvale, Sydney, NSW	Manly Warringah Sea Eagles	22,000
Campbelltown Stadium	Campbelltown, Sydney, NSW	Wests Tigers	20,000
Leichhardt Oval	Leichhardt, Sydney, NSW	Wests Tigers	20,000
Oki Jubilee Stadium	Kogarah, Sydney, NSW	St George Illawarra Dragons	20,541
Parramatta Stadium	Parramatta, Sydney, NSW	Parramatta Eels	20,500
CUA Stadium	Penrith, Sydney, NSW	Penrith Panthers	21,000
Telstra Stadium	Sydney Olympic Park, Sydney, NSW	Bulldogs; South Sydney Rabbitohs; Wests Tigers	83,500
Toyota Park	Cronulla, Sydney, NSW	Cronulla Sharks	21,500
Dairy Farmers Stadium	Kirwan, Townsville, Qld	North Queensland Cowboys	25,000
Mt Smart Stadium	Penrose, Auckland, New Zealand	New Zealand Warriors	25,000
WIN Stadium	Wollongong, NSW	St George Illawarra Dragons	20,000
Hindmarsh Stadium	Hindmarsh, Adelaide, SA		15,500
Bluetongue Central Coast Stadium	Gosford, Central Coast, NSW		20,059
Jade Stadium	Christchurch, New Zealand		36,500
Carrara Stadium	Carrara, Gold Coast, Qld		22,000
Waikato Stadium	Hamilton, New Zealand		26,350
Sydney Cricket Ground	Moore Park, Sydney, NSW		43,562

=== Advertising ===
In 2006 the NRL and their advertising agency MJW Hakuhodo stayed with the Hoodoo Gurus' "That's My Team" soundtrack for a fourth year, producing a treatment aimed to appeal to the fundamental hope of all players and fans: that it would be ‘their team’ who would win the Grand Final.

Capitalising on the enthusiasm generated by the Wests Tigers triumph of 2005 in only their sixth season, the campaign line and song chorus was changed to ‘That’s My Dream’.

All fifteen NRL club captains featured heavily in the television and outdoor ads holding aloft the Telstra trophy. Eight young real life fans also featured in the TV commercial reflecting the origins of the game from backyard football scenes to Sydney beaches. Each was a fan of one of eight clubs who had not till then won the Telstra Premiership trophy and four different broadcast versions of the ad told the stories of their love of the game and each's dream of their own team's victory.

=== Dally M Awards ===
The Dally M Awards were introduced in 1980 by News Limited. The most prestigious of these awards is the Dally M Medal which is awarded to the Player of the Year. The other prestigious award is the Provans Summons Medal which is the season's best player as voted by the public. As well as honouring the player of the year the awards night also recognises the premier player in each position, the best coach, the best captain, representative player of the year and the most outstanding rookie of the season. The awards night and Player of the Year medal are named in honour of Australian former rugby league great Herbert Henry "Dally" Messenger.

Award	Player	Club
Player of the Year	Cameron Smith	Melbourne Storm
Provans Summons Medal	Nathan Hindmarsh	Parramatta Eels
Rookie of the Year	Jarryd Hayne	Parramatta Eels
Captain of the Year	Ben Kennedy	Manly Warringah Sea Eagles
Rep Player of the Year	Darren Lockyer	Brisbane Broncos
Coach of the Year	Craig Bellamy	Melbourne Storm

Team of the Year

Award	Player	Club
Best Fullback	Clinton Schifcofske	Canberra Raiders
Best Winger	Brian Carney	Newcastle Knights
Best Centre	Mark Gasnier	St George Illawarra Dragons
Best Five-Eighth	Darren Lockyer	Brisbane Broncos
Best Halfback	Cooper Cronk	Melbourne Storm
Best Lock	Ben Kennedy	Manly Warringah Sea Eagles
Best Second-Rower	Nathan Hindmarsh	Parramatta Eels
Best Prop	Roy Asotasi	Bulldogs
Best Hooker	Cameron Smith	Melbourne Storm

=== Statistics and records ===
- Clinton Schifcofske ran 3,741 metres with the ball in 2006, more than any other player in the competition.
- The Brisbane Broncos set a club record for their biggest comeback win when they came from 18-0 down at half time to win 30-28 against Canberra Raiders in round 8.
- The Melbourne Storm set a club record for their longest winning streak with 11 games from Round 12 to Round 23.
- New Zealand Warriors defeated South Sydney Rabbitohs 66–0 in Round 16. This set new records for New Zealand's greatest winning margin and South Sydney's greatest losing margin.
- The Newcastle Knights and Canberra Raiders set the league record for the highest aggregate score in a match, with a total of 102 points scored in Newcastle's 70–32 win in Round 2. The previous record (97 points, between St George and Canterbury-Bankstown) had stood since 1935.
- The Cronulla-Sutherland Sharks set a then-club record for longest losing streak with 10 matches from Round 17 to Round 26.
- Nathan Merritt became the first player to top the try scoring chart from the wooden spoon winning side.

=== Ladder ===
2006 NRL season
Pos	Team	Pld	W	D	L	B	PF	PA	PD	Pts
1	Melbourne Storm	24	20	0	4	2	605	404	+201	44^{1}
2	Canterbury-Bankstown Bulldogs	24	16	0	8	2	608	468	+140	36
3	Brisbane Broncos (P)	24	14	0	10	2	497	392	+105	32
4	Newcastle Knights	24	14	0	10	2	608	538	+70	32
5	Manly Warringah Sea Eagles	24	14	0	10	2	534	493	+41	32
6	St George Illawarra Dragons	24	14	0	10	2	519	481	+38	32
7	Canberra Raiders	24	13	0	11	2	525	573	-48	30
8	Parramatta Eels	24	12	0	12	2	506	483	+23	28
9	North Queensland Cowboys	24	11	0	13	2	450	463	-13	26
10	New Zealand Warriors	24	12	0	12	2	552	463	+89	24^{2}
11	Wests Tigers	24	10	0	14	2	490	565	-75	24
12	Penrith Panthers	24	10	0	14	2	510	587	-77	24
13	Cronulla-Sutherland Sharks	24	9	0	15	2	515	544	-29	22
14	Sydney Roosters	24	8	0	16	2	528	650	-122	20
15	South Sydney Rabbitohs	24	3	0	21	2	429	772	-343	10

^{1} The Melbourne Storm were later stripped of this minor premiership due to gross salary cap breaches.
^{2} The New Zealand Warriors were deducted 4 competition points due to gross salary cap breaches.

=== Ladder progression ===
- Numbers highlighted in green indicate that the team finished the round inside the top 8.
- Numbers highlighted in blue indicates the team finished first on the ladder in that round.
- Numbers highlighted in red indicates the team finished in last place on the ladder in that round
- Underlined numbers indicate that the team had a bye during that round.

	Team	1	2	3	4	5	6	7	8	9	10	11	12	13	14	15	16	17	18	19	20	21	22	23	24	25	26
1	Melbourne	2	4	4	4	6	8	10	12	14	16	16	18	20	22	24	26	28	30	32	34	36	38	40	40	42	44
2	Bulldogs	0	2	2	4	6	8	8	10	12	14	16	16	18	18	20	20	24	24	26	28	30	32	34	34	34	36
3	Brisbane	0	2	4	4	6	8	10	12	12	14	16	18	20	20	20	22	22	24	26	26	26	26	26	28	30	32
4	Newcastle	2	4	6	6	8	8	8	10	12	14	16	16	16	18	18	18	20	20	20	22	24	26	26	28	30	32
5	Manly-Warringah	0	0	2	4	6	6	8	10	10	10	12	14	16	18	18	18	18	20	22	24	24	26	28	30	32	32
6	St George Illawarra	0	0	2	4	4	6	8	8	8	10	12	14	16	18	20	22	24	26	26	26	26	26	26	28	30	32
7	Canberra	2	2	2	4	4	6	8	8	10	10	10	12	14	16	16	18	18	18	20	22	22	24	26	28	28	30
8	Parramatta	0	2	2	2	2	4	6	6	6	6	6	8	8	8	10	12	14	16	18	20	22	24	26	28	28	28
9	North Queensland	2	4	6	8	10	12	12	12	14	14	16	16	16	16	16	16	18	20	20	22	22	22	22	22	24	26
10	New Zealand	-4	-4	-2	0	0	0	2	2	4	4	6	6	6	8	10	12	14	14	14	16	16	18	20	22	24	24
11	Wests	2	2	2	4	4	6	6	8	10	10	10	12	14	14	16	16	16	18	18	18	20	20	20	20	22	24
12	Penrith	2	4	6	6	8	8	8	8	8	10	12	12	12	12	14	16	16	18	20	20	22	22	22	24	24	24
13	Cronulla-Sutherland	2	2	2	4	4	4	6	8	10	12	12	14	16	18	20	22	22	22	22	22	22	22	22	22	22	22
14	Sydney	2	2	4	4	6	6	6	8	8	10	12	12	12	12	12	12	14	14	16	16	18	18	20	20	20	20
15	South Sydney	0	2	2	2	2	2	2	2	2	2	2	2	2	4	4	4	4	4	4	4	6	8	10	10	10	10

== Finals series ==
The Melbourne Storm went into the finals for the first time as Minor Premiers (at the time). They had a week off after their first finals win against the Parramatta Eels 12-6 to prepare for a preliminary final encounter, again the St. George Illawarra Dragons which was won by the Storm 24-10, earning them a spot in the Grand final against the Brisbane Broncos. The Broncos had surprised everyone in the previous two months. After a slight hiccup in the qualifying final, going down against St. George Illawarra Dragons 20-4, they came back in the next two weeks, beating the Newcastle Knights 50-6 in the Semi-final and coming from 20-6 down at halftime to win 37-20 against the Bulldogs in the preliminary final.

Home	Score	Away	Match information
Home	Score	Away	Date and time	Venue	Referee	Crowd
Qualifying finals
Newcastle Knights	25–18	Manly Warringah Sea Eagles	8 September 2006 8:00pm	EnergyAustralia Stadium	Sean Hampstead	23,752
Brisbane Broncos	4–20	St. George Illawarra Dragons	9 September 2006 6:30pm	Suncorp Stadium	Paul Simpkins	50,387
Canterbury-Bankstown Bulldogs	30–12	Canberra Raiders	9 September 2006 8:30pm	Telstra Stadium	Shayne Hayne	14,628
Melbourne Storm	12–6	Parramatta Eels	10 September 2006 4:00pm	Olympic Park	Steve Clark	15,690
Semi-finals
St. George Illawarra Dragons	28–0	Manly Warringah Sea Eagles	15 September 2006 7:45pm	Sydney Football Stadium	Paul Simpkins	30,907
Newcastle Knights	6–50	Brisbane Broncos	16 September 2006 7:45pm	Sydney Football Stadium	Steve Clark	22,081
Preliminary finals
Canterbury-Bankstown Bulldogs	20–37	Brisbane Broncos	22 September 2006 7:45pm	Sydney Football Stadium	Paul Simpkins	29,511
Melbourne Storm	24–10	St. George Illawarra Dragons	23 September 2006 7:45pm	Telstra Stadium	Steve Clark	40,901

=== Finals chart ===
Qualifying finals
1	Melbourne	12
8	Parramatta	6
2	Canterbury	30
7	Canberra	12
3	Brisbane	4
6	St. George Illawarra	20
4	Newcastle	25
5	Manly	18

Semifinals
4W	St. George Illawarra	28
2L	Manly	0
3W	Newcastle	6
1L	Brisbane	50

Preliminary finals
1W	Melbourne	24
St. George Illawarra	10
2W	Canterbury	20
Brisbane	37

Final
Melbourne	8
Brisbane	15

=== Grand Final ===
2006 NRL Grand Final

Sunday, 1 October
19:00 AEST (UTC+10)

Melbourne Storm	8 – 15	Brisbane Broncos
Tries: 2 Turner 14'; King 49'; Goals: C Smith (0/1); Geyer (0/1)	1st: 4–8; 2nd: 4–7; Report	Tries: 2 Hodges 19'; Tate 62'; Goals: 3 Lockyer pen 9', 20' (2/2); Parker pen 60' (1/2); Field goals: 1 Lockyer 73'

Telstra Stadium, Sydney
Attendance: 79,609
Referee: Paul Simpkins
Video referee: Bill Harrigan
Touch judges: Rod Lawrence, Steve Carrall
Clive Churchill Medal: Shaun Berrigan (Brisbane)

== Player statistics ==
The following statistics are as of the conclusion of Round 26.

Top 5 point scorers

Points	Player	Tries	Goals	Field goals
274	Hazem El Masri	16	105	0
193	Andrew Johns	8	80	1
192	Luke Covell	8	80	0
174	Clinton Schifcofske	6	74	2
168	Cameron Smith	5	74	0

Top 5 try scorers

Tries	Player
22	Nathan Merritt
20	Brett Stewart
19	Rhys Wesser
18	Mark Gasnier
18	Amos Roberts

Top 5 goal scorers

Goals	Player
105	Hazem El Masri
80	Andrew Johns
80	Luke Covell
74	Clinton Schifcofske
74	Cameron Smith

== 2006 transfers ==
=== Players ===
Player	2005 club	2006 club
Stuart Kelly	Brisbane Broncos	Retirement
Darren Mapp	Brisbane Broncos	Cronulla-Sutherland Sharks
Darren Smith	Brisbane Broncos	Retirement
Matt Adamson	Canberra Raiders	Retirement
Ben Cross	Canberra Raiders	Melbourne Storm
Matt Gafa	Canberra Raiders	Super League: Harlequins RL
Ian Hindmarsh	Canberra Raiders	Super League: Catalans Dragons
Ryan O'Hara	Canberra Raiders	Wests Tigers
Michael Robertson	Canberra Raiders	Manly Warringah Sea Eagles
Tyran Smith	Canberra Raiders	Retirement
Braith Anasta	Canterbury-Bankstown Bulldogs	Sydney Roosters
Jamahl Lolesi	Canterbury-Bankstown Bulldogs	Wests Tigers
Keith Galloway	Cronulla-Sutherland Sharks	Wests Tigers
Sam Isemonger	Cronulla-Sutherland Sharks	St. George Illawarra Dragons
Ryan McGoldrick	Cronulla-Sutherland Sharks	Super League: Castleford Tigers
Paul Mellor	Cronulla-Sutherland Sharks	South Sydney Rabbitohs
Nathan Merritt	Cronulla-Sutherland Sharks	South Sydney Rabbitohs
David Peachey	Cronulla-Sutherland Sharks	South Sydney Rabbitohs
Jason Stevens	Cronulla-Sutherland Sharks	Retirement
Michael Sullivan	Cronulla-Sutherland Sharks	Super League: Warrington Wolves
Scott Donald	Manly Warringah Sea Eagles	Super League: Leeds Rhinos
Sam Harris	Manly Warringah Sea Eagles	Wests Tigers
Daniel Heckenberg	Manly Warringah Sea Eagles	Super League: Harlequins RL
Terry Hill	Manly Warringah Sea Eagles	Retirement
John Hopoate	Manly Warringah Sea Eagles	Suspension
Chad Randall	Manly Warringah Sea Eagles	Super League: Harlequins RL
Steven Bell	Melbourne Storm	Manly Warringah Sea Eagles
Alex Chan	Melbourne Storm	Super League: Catalans Dragons
Robbie Kearns	Melbourne Storm	Retirement
Jamie McDonald	Melbourne Storm	Toulouse Olympique
Matt Orford	Melbourne Storm	Manly Warringah Sea Eagles
Peter Robinson	Melbourne Storm	Retirement
Dennis Scott	Melbourne Storm	Retirement
Mark Hughes	Newcastle Knights	Super League: Catalans Dragons
Andrew Price	Newcastle Knights	St. George Illawarra Dragons
Monty Betham	New Zealand Warriors	Super League: Wakefield Trinity Wildcats
Stacey Jones	New Zealand Warriors	Super League: Catalans Dragons
Francis Meli	New Zealand Warriors	Super League: St. Helens
Iafeta Palea'aesina	New Zealand Warriors	Super League: Wigan Warriors
Karl Te Mata	New Zealand Warriors	Super League: Harlequins RL
Richard Villasanti	New Zealand Warriors	Cronulla-Sutherland Sharks
Jaiman Lowe	North Queensland Cowboys	South Sydney Rabbitohs
Micheal Luck	North Queensland Cowboys	New Zealand Warriors
Leigh McWilliams	North Queensland Cowboys	Retirement
David Myles	North Queensland Cowboys	Toulouse Olympique
Paul Rauhihi	North Queensland Cowboys	Super League: Warrington Wolves
Chris Sheppard	North Queensland Cowboys	St. George Illawarra Dragons
Ashley Graham	Parramatta Eels	North Queensland Cowboys
Garret Crossman	Penrith Panthers	Melbourne Storm
Shannon Donato	Penrith Panthers	Retirement
Paul Franze	Penrith Panthers	Super League: Castleford Tigers
Joe Galuvao	Penrith Panthers	South Sydney Rabbitohs
Brett Howland	Penrith Panthers	Retirement
Ben Ross	Penrith Panthers	Cronulla-Sutherland Sharks
Bryan Fletcher	South Sydney Rabbitohs	Super League: Wigan Warriors
Glenn Hall	South Sydney Rabbitohs	Sydney Roosters
Ashley Harrison	South Sydney Rabbitohs	Sydney Roosters
Lee Hookey	South Sydney Rabbitohs	Penrith Panthers
Brett Kearney	South Sydney Rabbitohs	Cronulla-Sutherland Sharks
Scott Logan	South Sydney Rabbitohs	Super League: Wigan Warriors
Michael Ennis	St. George Illawarra Dragons	Brisbane Broncos
Willie Manu	St. George Illawarra Dragons	Super League: Castleford Tigers
Shane Marteene	St. George Illawarra Dragons	Retirement
Lance Thompson	St. George Illawarra Dragons	Cronulla-Sutherland Sharks
Albert Torrens	St. George Illawarra Dragons	Super League: Huddersfield Giants
Ned Catic	Sydney Roosters	Super League: Wakefield Trinity Wildcats
Jason Cayless	Sydney Roosters	Super League: St. Helens
Michael Crocker	Sydney Roosters	Melbourne Storm
Richie Faʻaoso	Sydney Roosters	Super League: Castleford Tigers
Luke Ricketson	Sydney Roosters	Retirement
Chris Walker	Sydney Roosters	Melbourne Storm
Stuart Webb	Sydney Roosters	South Sydney Rabbitohs
Robert Miles	Wests Tigers	Retirement
Mark O'Neill	Wests Tigers	Super League: Leeds Rhinos
Pat Richards	Wests Tigers	Super League: Wigan Warriors
Matthew Rieck	Wests Tigers	Retirement
John Wilson	Wests Tigers	Super League: Catalans Dragons
Craig Stapleton	Super League: Leigh Centurions	Penrith Panthers
Mark O'Halloran	Super League: London Broncos	Penrith Panthers
Darren Albert	Super League: St. Helens	Cronulla-Sutherland Sharks
Mark Edmondson	Super League: St. Helens	Sydney Roosters
Andrew Emelio	Super League: Widnes Vikings	Canterbury-Bankstown Bulldogs
Brian Carney	Super League: Wigan Warriors	Newcastle Knights
Shane Muspratt	North Queensland Young Guns (Queensland Cup)	North Queensland Cowboys
Matt Bickerstaff	N/A	St. George Illawarra Dragons
Luke Davico	N/A	Newcastle Knights
John Doyle	N/A	Sydney Roosters
George Gatis	N/A	New Zealand Warriors

== See also ==
- 2006 State of Origin series
- 2006 Rugby League Tri-Nations
- Rugby league in 2006
