= Steve Meredith =

Samoan rugby league footballer

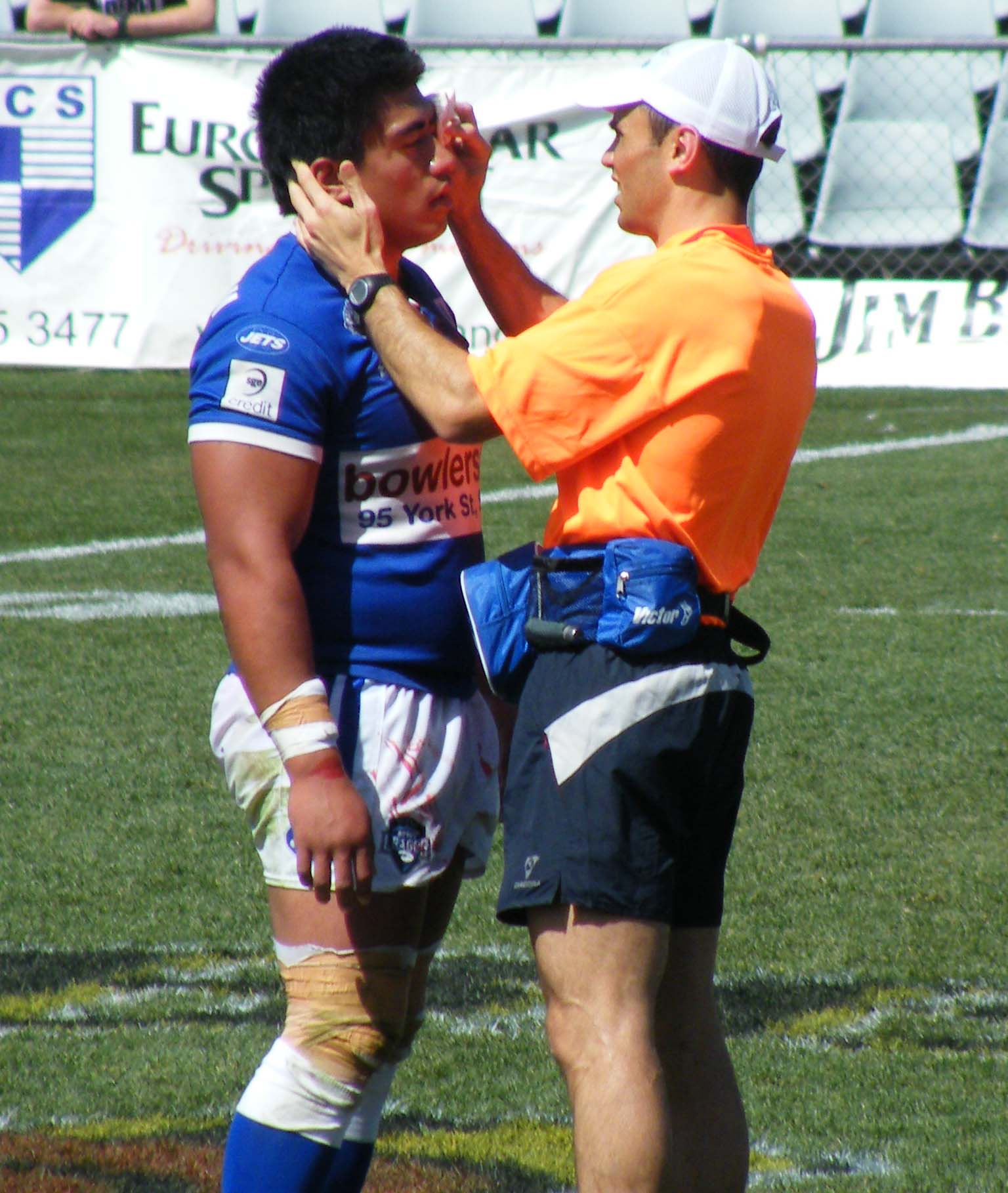

Personal information
- Born: 26 August 1985 (age 40) Samoa
- Height: 182 cm (6 ft 0 in)
- Weight: 103 kg (16 st 3 lb)

Playing information
- Position: Prop
Club
Years	Team	Pld	T	G	FG	P
2006	Sydney Roosters	1	0	0	0	0
Representative
Years	Team	Pld	T	G	FG	P
2005	Samoa	1	0	0	0	0
- Source: As of 3 July 2026

Steve Meredith (born 26 August 1985 in Samoa) is a former professional Samoan rugby league footballer, who last played with the Windsor Wolves in the NSW Cup.

== Career ==
Meredith played in the Sydney Roosters Jersey Flegg Grand final winning team in 2002.

He was selected for the Australian Schoolboys Team in 2003 and the NSW u/19 State Of Origin team in 2004.

Meredith played in the Sydney Roosters Premier League grand final winning team in 2004 and also played in 2005 Premier League Grand final for the club. In 2005, Meredith made his test debut for Samoa against Tonga. In round 6 of the 2006 NRL season, he made his NRL debut for the Sydney Roosters against Brisbane. He suffered a season ending knee injury of the match which the club lost 24–6.

In 2008, he played for Newtown in their NSW Cup grand final loss to Wentworthville. The match is the longest in rugby league history with the game going over 100 minutes.

It was announced on Penrith's official website forum on 2 January 2009 that Meredith had signed to play with the Windsor Wolves for that season and would also train for three months with the Penrith team.
