= Brent McConnell =

Australian rugby league footballer

Personal information
- Full name: Brent McConnell
- Born: 12 November 1980 (age 44); Penrith, New South Wales, Australia

Playing information
- Height: 170 cm (5 ft 7 in)
- Weight: 80 kg (12 st 8 lb)
- Position: Halfback
Club
Years	Team	Pld	T	G	FG	P
2006	North Qld Cowboys	3	1	2	0	8

Brent McConnell (born 12 November 1980) is an Australian former professional rugby league footballer.

== Playing career ==
He made his first grade debut for the North Queensland Cowboys against the South Sydney Rabbitohs in round 17 of the 2006 NRL season. In that fixture McConnell scored the match-winning try against Souths to win the game for North Queensland 16–14 with only five minutes left. He only played two more games in 2006 due to injury.

For the 2007 season, McConnell moved to the Brisbane Broncos, playing most of the season in the Queensland Cup for the Aspley Broncos. He then joined the Burleigh Bears.
