= Ben Czislowski =

Australian rugby league footballer

Personal information
- Full name: Ben Czislowski
- Born: 8 April 1983 (age 42); Townsville, Queensland, Australia

Playing information
- Height: 186 cm (6 ft 1 in)
- Position: Prop
Club
Years	Team	Pld	T	G	FG	P
2004	Brisbane Broncos	1	0	0	0	0
2005–06	Canterbury-Bankstown	8	0	0	0	0
	Total	9	0	0	0	0

Ben Czislowski (born 8 April 1983) is an Australian former professional rugby league footballer. Czislowski played for the Brisbane Broncos and the Canterbury-Bankstown Bulldogs in the National Rugby League. His position of choice was at prop-forward.

== Early years ==
Czislowski was born in Townsville, Queensland, Australia.

While attending Runcorn State High School, Czislowski played for the Australian Schoolboys team in 2000. Czislowski played junior footy for Logan Brothers.

Czislowski experienced a collision with an opponent Matt Austin of the Tweed Heads. After complaining of head pains and an infection, his doctor finally found Austin's tooth embedded in his head. The tooth was removed and Czislowski claims to have it on his bedside table. This incident earned mention in 'Ripley's Believe it or Not! Prepare to be Shocked!' book

== Playing career ==
Czislowski played one game for the Brisbane Broncos in 2004 and eight games for Canterbury-Bankstown between 2005 and 2006. As 2004 NRL premiers, Canterbury faced Super League IX champions Leeds in the 2005 World Club Challenge. Czislowski played from the interchange bench in the Bulldogs' 32–39 loss.

== Later years ==
In the 2008 season, Czislowski spent time playing for the Wynnum Manly Seagulls in the Queensland Cup before retiring at the end of the season.
