= Neil Sweeney =

Australian rugby league footballer

Personal information
- Full name: Neil Sweeney
- Born: 9 March 1977 (age 49) Newcastle, New South Wales, Australia

Playing information
- Height: 184 cm (6 ft 0 in)
- Weight: 84 kg (13 st 3 lb)
- Position: Wing
Club
Years	Team	Pld	T	G	FG	P
2002	Newcastle Knights	4	2	0	0	8
2003–07	North Qld Cowboys	49	16	2	0	68
	Total	53	18	2	0	76

Neil Sweeney (born 9 September 1977) is an Australian former professional rugby league footballer who played in the 2000s. He played at club level for the Newcastle Knights and the North Queensland Cowboys, as a wing.

== Early life ==
Sweeney was born in Newcastle, New South Wales, Australia. He was raised in the Lake Macquarie Suburb of Teralba and attended local primary and high schools.

== Playing career ==
Sweeney made his first grade debut against Penrith in Round 19 2002 scoring two tries. Sweeney joined North Queensland in 2003 and played for the club over the next 5 seasons but did not feature in the club's first ever finals campaign in 2004 nor the 2005 NRL grand final against the Wests Tigers.

== Sources ==
- Whiticker, Alan; Hudson, Glen (2007). The Encyclopedia of Rugby League Players. Wetherill Park, New South Wales: Gary Allen Pty Ltd. p. 609. ISBN 978-1-877082-93-1.
