= Daniel Irvine =

Australian rugby league footballer and coach

Personal information
- Full name: Daniel Irvine
- Born: 13 February 1982 (age 44) Westmead, New South Wales, Australia

Playing information
- Height: 5 ft 8 in (173 cm)
- Weight: 13 st 7 lb (86 kg; 189 lb)
- Position: Hooker
Club
Years	Team	Pld	T	G	FG	P
2000–02	Parramatta Eels	35	4	0	0	16
2005–06	Canterbury-Bankstown	7	0	0	0	0
2007	South Sydney	11	1	0	0	4
	Total	53	5	0	0	20
- Education: Parramatta Marist High School
- Relatives: Ken Irvine (uncle)

Daniel Irvine (born 13 February 1982) is an Australian former professional rugby league footballer who played in the 2000s. He played in the National Rugby League for Australian clubs, the Parramatta Eels, Canterbury-Bankstown and South Sydney.

== Background ==
Nephew of Australian Rugby League Great Ken Irvine, Irvine attended Parramatta Marist High and was selected to play for the Australian Schoolboys team in 1999.

== Playing career ==
Irvine formerly played for the Parramatta Eels then Canterbury-Bankstown and is commonly known by the nickname of Bubsy. Irvine signed a 2-year contract with South Sydney for 2007/2008 season.

== Coaching career ==
Irvine went on to coach the South Sydney Toyota Cup team for the 2008/09 seasons.
