= Albert Torrens =

Australian rugby league footballer

Personal information
- Full name: Albert Torrens
- Born: 1 July 1976 (age 50) Casino, New South Wales, Australia

Playing information
- Height: 177 cm (5 ft 10 in)
- Weight: 93 kg (14 st 9 lb)
- Position: Centre, Wing
Club
Years	Team	Pld	T	G	FG	P
1998–99	Manly-Warringah	49	21	0	0	84
2000–02	Northern Eagles	60	16	0	0	64
2003–04	Manly-Warringah	38	17	0	0	68
2005	St George Illawarra	10	3	0	0	12
2006	Huddersfield	7	5	0	0	20
	Total	164	62	0	0	248

Albert Torrens (born 1 July 1976) is an Australian former professional rugby league footballer who played in the 1990s and 2000s. He played for the Manly-Warringah Sea Eagles, Northern Eagles and St. George Illawarra Dragons in the NRL and in England for the Huddersfield Giants of Super League as a centre and on the wing.

== Playing career ==
Torrens made his first grade debut for Manly in Round 1 1998 against Brisbane. In 1999, Torrens finished as joint top try scorer along with Steve Menzies. Torrens scored a hat-trick for Manly in the club's final game against St George before merging with arch rivals North Sydney to form the Northern Eagles.

Torrens played with the Northern Eagles for the 3 seasons they were in the competition. After the dissolution of the club, Torrens joined Manly-Warringah once again and played with them up until the end of 2004. In 2005, Torrens joined St George Illawarra and played one season with them before moving to England and playing in the English Super League for the Huddersfield Giants club, before retiring at the end of 2006.

== Post playing ==
Since retiring from competitive rugby, Torrens has worked as an Indigenous outreach worker for Mission Australia. In 2009 and 2010, he studied indigenous community health at Curtin University in Western Australia.
