= Andrew Price (rugby league) =

Australian rugby league footballer

Personal information
- Full name: Andrew Price
- Born: 9 May 1982 (age 44) Canberra, Australian Capital Territory, Australia

Playing information
- Position: Second-row, Lock
Club
Years	Team	Pld	T	G	FG	P
2003–05	Newcastle Knights	34	2	0	0	8
2006	St. George Illawarra	5	1	0	0	4
	Total	39	3	0	0	12
- Source: As of 7 February 2019

Andrew Price (born 2 June 1982) is an Australian former professional rugby league footballer who played in the 2000s. He played for the Newcastle Knights from 2003 to 2005 and the St. George Illawarra Dragons in 2006.

== Background ==
Price was born in Canberra, Australian Capital Territory.

== Playing career ==
Price made his first grade debut for Newcastle in Round 3 2003 against Parramatta. Price played with Newcastle until the end of 2005 with his final game for the club being a 22–18 victory over North Queensland in Round 18 2005. At the end of the season, Newcastle finished last claiming the wooden spoon and Price was released.

In 2006, Price signed with St George and played 1 season with them. His final game in first grade was a 54–6 loss against his former club Newcastle in Round 5 2006.
