= Lance Thompson =

Australian rugby league footballer (1978–2018)

Personal information
- Born: 16 February 1978 Sydney, New South Wales, Australia
- Died: 23 August 2018 (aged 40) Cronulla, New South Wales, Australia

Playing information
- Height: 185 cm (6 ft 1 in)
- Weight: 100 kg (15 st 10 lb)
- Position: Second-row, Prop
Club
Years	Team	Pld	T	G	FG	P
1995–98	St George Dragons	69	4	9	0	34
1999–05	St. George Illawarra	132	20	8	0	96
2006–08	Cronulla Sharks	38	5	1	0	22
	Total	239	29	18	0	152
Representative
Years	Team	Pld	T	G	FG	P
2001–07	NSW City	5	0	0	0	0

Lance Thompson (16 February 1978 – 23 August 2018) was an Australian professional rugby league footballer who played in the 1990s and 2000s. He played for St. George, St. George Illawarra and Cronulla-Sutherland. He primarily played in the second-row, though he also played prop.

== Background ==
While attending Kingsgrove High School, Thompson was selected to play for the Australian Schoolboys team in 1994 and 1995. He played his junior football with Hurstville United.

== Professional playing career ==
=== St. George and St. George Illawarra ===
Thompson made his first grade debut in Round 13, St George against Cronulla at Toyota Park, 24 June 1995 as a 17-year-old. He played for the club until the end of 2006. Thompson played at second-row forward for St. George in the 1996 ARL Grand Final loss to Manly Warringah and for St. George Illawarra Dragons in their 1999 NRL Grand Final loss to the Melbourne Storm. During his many years at the Dragons, Lance Thompson was a crowd favourite at Kogarah and Wollongong, and it caused some controversy amongst supporters when he departed at the end of the 2005 season.

=== Cronulla-Sutherland ===
During 2006, Thompson's appearances for Cronulla against his former side, St George Illawarra, were highly anticipated. The first of these matches saw Thompson scoring two tries, and the second involved St. George player Dean Young being injured in a Thompson tackle, sidelining Young for most of the 2007 season.

In 2007 Thompson was selected for the final time for the City side which won the annual City vs. Country match, the NSWRL's precursor to the State of Origin series. Thompson played his final NRL game in Round 6 against the Penrith Panthers after announcing his retirement from Rugby league on Wednesday, 16 April. In a press conference, Thompson explained that the reason for this decision was an ongoing knee injury sustained in 2007 and because he was diagnosed with type one diabetes and that he had "one last game left in him." Cronulla-Sutherland Sharks coach Ricky Stuart gave Thompson his last game in Round 6 for his "last hurrah." Thompson scored a try early in the match but Cronulla lost the game 20–21 in golden point.

== Post playing ==
Thompson later became coach of the Cronulla side in the reserve-grade New South Wales Cup competition. At the time of his death, he managed the bistro at the Woolooware Golf Club, which was thriving at the time.

== Death ==
Thompson died in Cronulla on 23 August 2018. The death was believed to be a medical episode. It was confirmed by his daughter in July 2026, his death was due to diabetic ketoacidosis, a life-threatening complication of type 1 diabetes. He was honored by more than 400 friends, family, teammates, and coaches at a tribute luncheon in Sydney.
