= 2006 Sydney Roosters season =

- NRL rank: 14th
- 2006 record: Wins: 8; draws: 0; losses: 16
- Points scored: For: 528 (93tries, 78goals);

Team information
- Coach: Ricky Stuart
- Captain: Craig Fitzgibbon
- Stadium: Sydney Football Stadium
- Avg. attendance: 11,889

Top scorers
- Tries: Amos Roberts 18
- Goals: Craig Fitzgibbon 62
- Points: Craig Fitzgibbon 128
← 2005	2007 →

The 2006 Sydney Roosters season was the 99th in the club's history. They competed in the NRL's 2006 Telstra Premiership and finished the regular season 14th (out of 15).

== Results ==
Round	Opponent	Result	Syd	Opp.	Date	Venue	Crowd
1	South Sydney Rabbitohs	Win	40	22	14 Mar	Aussie Stadium	
2	Melbourne Storm	Loss	12	16	19 Mar	SFS	
3	Canberra Raiders	Win	56	26	26 Mar	SFS	
4	Manly Sea Eagles	Loss	22	30	1 Apr	Brookvale Oval	
5	Cronulla Sharks	Win	28	24	8 Apr	Toyota Park	
6	Brisbane Broncos	Loss	6	24		SFS	
7	St George-Illawarra Dragons	Loss	12	22	25 Apr	Aussie Stadium	
8	North Queensland Cowboys	Win	22	18	29 Apr	Dairy Farmers Stadium	

== Player Summary ==
Sydney Roosters 2006	Appearance	Interchange	Tries	Goals	F/G	Points
Braith Anasta	16	-	-	-	-	0
Ryan Cross	20	-	13	-	-	52
John Doyle	4	6	1	-	-	4
Mark Edmondson	-	2	-	-	-	0
Brett Finch	21	2	5	-	-	0
Craig Fitzgibbon	22	-	1	62	-	128
Chris Flannery	14	7	4	-	-	16
Shaun Foley	9	-	6	-	-	24
Glenn Hall	2	-	-	-	-	0
Ashley Harrison	16	5	3	-	-	12
Heath L'Estrange	3	4	-	-	-	0
Josh Lewis	11	-	3	4	-	20
Lufi Manua	2	-	-	-	-	0
Vince Mellars	12	-	3	-	-	12
Steve Meredith	-	1	-	-	-	0
Anthony Minichiello	6	-	4	-	-	16
Adrian Morley	16	-	1	-	-	4
Lelea Paea	3	-	-	-	-	0
Lopini Paea	-	6	-	-	-	0
Mickey Paea	1	4	1	-	-	0
Sam Perrett	17	-	7	-	-	28
Nigel Plum	10	4	1	-	-	4
Amos Roberts	23	-	18	11	-	94
Setaimata Sa	2	10	1	-	-	4
Shane Shackleton	7	12	-	-	-	0
David Shillington	20	4	3	-	-	12
Iosia Soliola	21	-	8	-	-	32
Jamie Soward	8	6	4	1	-	18
Charlie Tonga	1	9	-	-	-	0
Anthony Tupou	12	9	4	-	-	16
Craig Wing	13	5	2	-	-	8
Total	312	96	93	78	0	528
