= 2006 Newcastle Knights season =

← 2005	2007 →

The 2006 Newcastle Knights season was the 19th in the club's history. They competed in the NRL's 2006 Telstra Premiership and finished the regular season 4th (out of 15), reaching the semi-finals only to be knocked out by eventual premiers, the Brisbane Broncos.

== Season summary ==
The 2006 season was dominated early by news that coaches Michael Hagan and Brian Smith, who were coaching the Knights and the Parramatta Eels respectively at the time, were to swap clubs from the 2007 season onwards. Coincidentally, this news also dominated prior to their round one meeting in Newcastle, which the Knights won 25-6 (exacting revenge following Parramatta's 50–0 win last year).

On the field, the season was a massive improvement from the 2005 season which netted just eight wins. The Knights were unbeaten after round three and were early-season joint competition leaders with North Queensland and Penrith. Following a hiccup in round four against the New Zealand Warriors, the Knights headed down to Wollongong and thrashed the St. George Illawarra Dragons 54–6; therefore exacting revenge following the Dragons' 48–2 win in 2004 (the first match for Newcastle since Andrew Johns suffered a season-ending knee injury that year). Then came the much anticipated, top-of-the-ladder showdown against the Cowboys pitting Johns against 2005 Dally M Medallist Johnathan Thurston. Unfortunately, Newcastle lost by just 18–16, and Johns was injured yet again. His absence was evident in Newcastle's 52-6 hammering in Melbourne the following week, but wins followed over the South Sydney Rabbitohs and Brisbane Broncos, putting Newcastle's season back on track. The win over the Broncos was achieved two days after Lockyer and Johns played as Australia's halves pairing for the final time.

During the State of Origin period Newcastle suffered a form slump; losing seven of eight matches with a bye sandwiched in between. However, unlike previous years when Michael Hagan was unavailable due to his Queensland Origin commitments, he was fully in charge of the Newcastle team during this period.

Andrew Johns broke the NRL all-time pointscoring record (since broken again by Hazem El Masri) previously held by Jason Taylor, against the Parramatta Eels at Parramatta Stadium in round 18. Coincidentally, Taylor was the Eels relieving coach at the time; but at the conclusion of the match Johns ignored Taylor and the match ball as a commemoration; the possibility being the nature of Newcastle's 46–12 defeat.

Newcastle finished fourth at the end of the regular season, an 11-place improvement from the previous season. They were drawn a home final against the Manly-Warringah Sea Eagles whom the Knights defeated in the famous 1997 ARL Grand Final nine years earlier. Despite trailing 18–6 at halftime, the Knights won its first final since their 2001 Grand Final victory by winning 25–18, but the win came at a cost with hooker Danny Buderus suspended for a spear tackle on Manly winger Michael Robertson, ruling him out of Newcastle's following final against the Brisbane Broncos in what was the last ever Johns vs. Lockyer showdown. The Knights lost 50–6, ending Newcastle's season of improvement.

Overall, Newcastle defeated every team in the top eight except for the first-placed Melbourne Storm.

== Match results ==
Round	Opponent	Result	New.	Opp.	Date	Venue
1	Parramatta Eels	Win	25	6	11 March	EnergyAustralia Stadium
2	Canberra Raiders	Win	70	32	19 March	Canberra Stadium
3	Canterbury Bulldogs	Win	46	22	24 March	EnergyAustralia Stadium
4	New Zealand Warriors	Loss	22	26	2 April	EnergyAustralia Stadium
5	St. George Illawarra Dragons	Win	54	6	8 April	WIN Stadium
6	North Queensland Cowboys	Loss	16	18	16 April	EnergyAustralia Stadium
7	Melbourne Storm	Loss	6	52	22 April	Olympic Park
8	South Sydney Rabbitohs	Win	24	18	30 April	Telstra Stadium
9	Brisbane Broncos	Win	32	30	7 May	EnergyAustralia Stadium
10	Wests Tigers	Win	18	16	14 May	EnergyAustralia Stadium
11	Canberra Raiders	Win	22	12	20 May	EnergyAustralia Stadium
12	St. George Illawarra Dragons	Loss	12	38	26 May	EnergyAustralia Stadium
13	Canterbury Bulldogs	Loss	22	38	3 June	Telstra Stadium
14	BYE					
15	New Zealand Warriors	Loss	18	30	18 June	Ericsson Stadium
16	Cronulla Sharks	Loss	16	26	24 June	EnergyAustralia Stadium
17	Manly Sea Eagles	Win	26	12	30 June	Brookvale Oval
18	Parramatta Eels	Loss	12	46	8 July	Parramatta Stadium
19	Melbourne Storm	Loss	16	24	16 July	EnergyAustralia Stadium
20	South Sydney Rabbitohs	Win	24	18	22 July	EnergyAustralia Stadium
21	Cronulla Sharks	Win	22	18	28 July	Toyota Park
22	Sydney Roosters	Win	32	18	6 August	Central Coast Stadium
23	Manly Sea Eagles	Loss	14	16	11 August	EnergyAustralia Stadium
24	North Queensland Cowboys	Win	19	12	19 August	Dairy Farmers Stadium
25	Penrith Panthers	Win	40	4	26 August	EnergyAustralia Stadium
26	BYE					
Qualif. Final	Manly Sea Eagles	Win	25	18	8 September	EnergyAustralia Stadium
Semi Final	Brisbane Broncos	Loss	6	50	16 September	Sydney Football Stadium
