= Melbourne Storm salary cap breach =

Melbourne Storm salary cap scandal
- Date: 2006 – 22 April 2010
- Location: Melbourne, Victoria, Australia
- Also known as: Melbourne Storm salary cap scandal
- Type: National Rugby League salary cap
- Participants: Melbourne Storm (Brian Waldron, Matt Hanson, Paul Gregory, Peter O'Sullivan, Cameron Vale); News Corp Australia (John Hartigan); National Rugby League (David Gallop, Ian Schubert)
- Outcome: Melbourne Storm stripped of 2007 and 2009 premierships; Melbourne Storm stripped of 2006, 2007 and 2008 minor premierships; Melbourne Storm fined $1.7 million; All competition points for the 2010 NRL season annulled; Melbourne Storm sentenced to finish the 2010 season at the bottom of the ladder; Melbourne Storm stripped of 2010 World Club Challenge
- Inquiries: National Rugby League investigation, 2010
- Suspects: Brian Waldron, Matt Hanson, Paul Gregory, Peter O'Sullivan

The Melbourne Storm salary cap breach was a major breach of the National Rugby League's strictly enforced salary cap by the Melbourne Storm club over a period of five years. The discovery of these breaches in 2010 by the NRL resulted in it stripping the Storm of all honours achieved as a team between 2006 and 2010. This included the 2007 and 2009 premierships, the 2006, 2007 and 2008 minor premierships and the 2010 World Club Challenge title.

== Investigation ==
Following claims by a whistleblower that the club was keeping a second set of books, the NRL conducted an investigation in late 2009 and early 2010. After initially denying the claims, Storm officials confessed on 22 April 2010 that the club had committed systematic breaches of the salary cap over five years between 2006 and 2010 by running a dual contract and bookkeeping system. The NRL estimated the breach to be in excess of $1.7 million over five years, around $400,000 in 2009 and with a projected breach of $700,000 in 2010.

As a club's compliance with the NRL salary cap is supported by statutory declarations, the club's owners requested that fraud and perjury charges be laid against those responsible and stated that any person who knew of the breach would be expelled from the club. The Victorian Fraud Squad began preliminary investigations on 23 April, and the Australian Securities and Investments Commission also made preliminary investigations and indicated an interest in investigating breaches of the Corporations Act. Storm executives had arranged for inflated invoices to be submitted to hide the payments to players. This involved submitting invoices of up to $20,000 above the real value of the services rendered, with this amount paid directly to players by the third-party suppliers, although there was no suggestion that the suppliers were involved in submitting the inflated invoices.

== Penalties ==
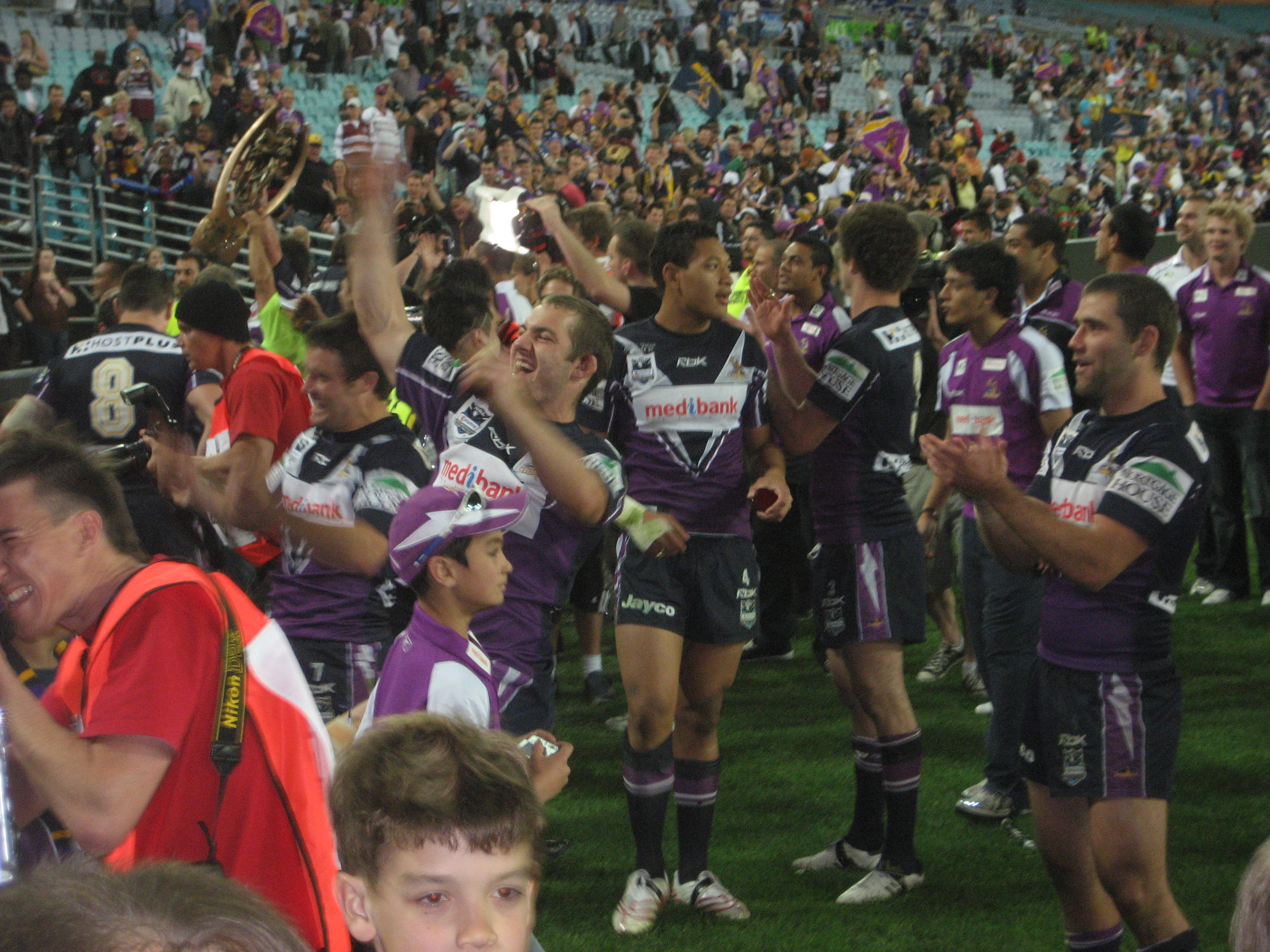
Storm players after winning the 2007 NRL Grand Final

NRL Chief Executive David Gallop imposed the following penalties on the Storm later on 22 April:

- The Melbourne Storm were stripped of their 2007 and 2009 premierships and their 2006, 2007 and 2008 minor premierships, which were withheld.
- An Australian sporting record total fine of $1,689,000 (composed of $1.1 million in NRL prize money which was re-distributed equally between the remaining 15 clubs, $89,000 in prize money from the World Club Challenge, which was re-distributed to the Leeds Rhinos, and the maximum penalty of $500,000 for breaching the salary cap regulations).
- Deduction of all eight premiership points they had already received in the 2010 season, and barred from receiving any further premiership points (including points automatically awarded for a bye during the season) for the rest of the 2010 season.
- Further, the club were also ordered to cut their payroll by $1,012,500 to meet the 2011 salary cap by 31 December 2010; failure to do so would have resulted in the club being suspended from the 2011 NRL season.

The Storm initially accepted this decision without question but later appealed the loss of their two premierships and premiership points for the 2010 season. The court action was later dropped, with the Storm paying the NRL's legal costs.

Despite the stripping of the two premierships, Greg Inglis and Billy Slater continue to be recognized as the Clive Churchill Medallists from 2007 and 2009, respectively.

== Suspects ==
Former CEO Brian Waldron, suspended chief executive officer and former chief financial officer Matt Hanson, and chief financial officer Paul Gregory are alleged to have been the main culprits behind the breaches. Former chief financial officer Cameron Vale was said to have been the whistleblower on the situation, a claim he denies.

On the 23 April 2010, the NRL seized a secret dossier hidden in the home of acting chief executive Matt Hanson. The dossier contained letters of offer to three of the Storm's star players (Greg Inglis, Billy Slater, and Cameron Smith) and another unnamed player guaranteeing illegal payments in the form of goods from third parties. For one player with a $400,000 contract lodged with the NRL, the letter of offer was valued at $950,000, and contained a $20,000 gift voucher for a national retailer and a $30,000 boat. Other offers included a new car for a player's partner and $30,000 in home renovations. The offers together amounted to $700,000, of which the four players had already received $400,000. While Waldron had signed all the letters of offer, only Inglis and Slater had signed theirs, albeit the letters were written in a way that the players may not have realised the extra payments were outside the cap. On the same day, Brian Waldron resigned from his position of chief executive of the Melbourne Rebels Rugby Union Club after just six weeks of taking over the expansion team entering the new Super Rugby competition. The AFL investigated, and cleared, the St Kilda Football Club's players' payments during Waldron's three-year time at the club alongside now-former Storm CEO Matt Hanson.

On 16 November 2022, Brian Waldron broke his silence after 5 years and admitted in an interview that he was responsible for the salary cap issues. He stated while there were others who were aware, he took responsibility for the scheme as CEO.

== Reaction ==
The news was referred to by The Age newspaper as "The biggest scandal in Australian sports history". Club supporters had mixed reactions and feelings towards the situation, as the club was left with "dishonour and shame". No club had ever been stripped of a competition title in 102 years of professional rugby league in Australia. One fan dumped his jerseys and other memorabilia at the team's Carlton headquarters on hearing about the incident, while others simply broke into tears. There was a general feeling that former CEO Brian Waldron was to blame for the entire scandal and not the players.

Deputy Prime Minister Julia Gillard, who was the club's number-one female ticket holder, said that supporters would be shocked and saddened, but she hoped that they would stand by the club as it rebuilt. Storm chairman Dr. Rob Moodie apologised to the fans, many of whom publicly removed their Storm colours and dumped them in disgust.

Several sponsors, most notably ME Bank, Hostplus and Skins immediately withdrew support from the club, while Harvey Norman, Jayco, Suzuki and KooGa continued their support, with their logos featuring prominently in a hastily reconfigured jersey. In contrast to those sponsors who distanced themselves, Jayco and Suzuki increased their existing support to compensate for the losses of other sponsors.

We are devastated. This is the lowest day for our club. We have betrayed the trust of the Australian people. We haven't played by the rules.

— Dr Rob Moodie, The Courier Mail

Betting agencies received an "old-fashioned betting sting", as some punters found out about the salary cap allegations before they became common knowledge. At the time, the Storm were inside the top four of the NRL ladder with four wins and two losses, $4.20 favourites to win the title and $251 to win the wooden spoon. TAB Sportsbet claimed it had to pay out at least $500,000 before betting was suspended.

Melbourne sports industry experts John Poulakakis (Chief commercial officer, Melbourne F.C.) and Martin Hirons (Melbourne sport business consultant) were reported in The Age, saying it could take little more than four weeks to two months to recover the $2 million it is believed to have already lost in sponsorship.

By 30 April, The Age was reporting a surge in club membership of 700 over the five days since the scandal erupted, with members who had previously revoked their memberships contacting the club to have them reinstated.

== Aftermath ==
On 15 July 2010, three months after the breach was exposed, News Limited referred the matter to ASIC and the Victoria Police to investigate possible fraud by the perpetrators. The matter was also referred to the Australian Tax Office and the Victorian State Revenue Office the next day.

We had some rats in our ranks. A small group of senior managers at the club orchestrated and concealed the extra payments. They are Brian Waldron, Matt Hanson, Paul Gregory, Peter O'Sullivan and Cameron Vale.

— John Hartigan, chairman and CEO of News Limited, the owner of the Melbourne Storm, The Courier Mail

Despite having to play out the remainder of the 2010 season for no points, Melbourne remained competitive finishing with a record of 14 wins (ten of which came after the salary cap breach was revealed) and 10 losses. Had they been allowed to play for points, the club would have finished equal 5th. The club needed to shed several players at the conclusion of the season to help it fall back within the salary cap and these included: Greg Inglis, Brett White, Ryan Hoffman, Brett Finch, Jeff Lima and Aiden Tolman.

On 6 May 2011, the Victoria Police concluded its fraud investigation into the matter stating "It can no longer expend further resources on this matter" and that "no fraud has been committed". That same week, the National Rugby League released its report on the breaches. The report did not detail any new breaches, however, it was recommended that Melbourne's 2010 World Club challenge also be revoked. The report also confirmed the guilty parties and vindicated all players and coaches.

Melbourne were able to rebuild the team and remain successful in the immediate years following the breach with the club winning the 2011 minor premiership, the 2012 NRL Grand Final and the 2013 World Club Challenge. Apart from the 2010 season, Melbourne had not missed the finals on win–loss record since 2002; that streak came to an end in 2026.

In 2016, the Parramatta Eels were also caught breaching the salary cap by making payments to several players via external companies (third-party payments). The main point of difference between the two episodes was the manner of the punishment: while Melbourne were not allowed to play for points for the remainder of the season, Parramatta were permitted to play for points as soon as they fell back in line with the cap. It was acknowledged that this change was made due to the demoralising nature of the Storm punishment, including fans having to witness a team running out week after week with nothing to play for.

In 2017, Melbourne held a gala dinner for the 10 year reunion of the 2007 team who were stripped of the title where coach Craig Bellamy spoke to the media regarding the 2007 NRL Grand Final result and penalty.

They can say what they like and erase what they like, but they are not going to erase these guys memories of what they did in 2007.

— Craig Bellamy, Coach of Melbourne Storm, smh.com.au

In July 2018, Melbourne player Billy Slater spoke to the media about his possible retirement, and midway through the discussion said "I've been fortunate to play in many grand finals. I've won four and that won't determine whether I go on next year". Slater's statement, while accurate, does not reflect the fact that two of the premierships he won were later stripped by the NRL.

In March 2019, Melbourne captain Cameron Smith called for a new investigation to be conducted with the potential for both the 2007 and 2009 stripped premierships to be reinstated. Smith was upset at the fact that the Cronulla-Sutherland Sharks were allowed to keep their 2016 premiership despite being over the salary cap between 2013 and 2017 to a total of $700,000. Even though the amount that Cronulla were over the cap was a lot less than the Melbourne salary cap breaches, Smith felt that Melbourne had been hard done by. In the week that followed, NRL CEO Todd Greenberg ruled out the possibility of the 2007 and 2009 stripped premierships being reinstated.

Later that year, in August, Smith was interviewed by Matthew Johns about the club's stripped premierships and stated that those premierships victories were still considered valid to him.

You’ve got different opinions ... they are ours, We’ve still got the memories, we’ve all got the rings, I get it, people will say ‘how can you think like that?’ but that's just the way it is.

— Cameron Smith, Captain of Melbourne Storm 2007-2020, Foxsports.com.au

Following the club's 2020 NRL Grand Final victory, Melbourne players were seen wearing shirts depicting that the club had won six premierships (this included the stripped titles). The NRL later banned the shirts from being sold, although it was because they were made by an unlicensed manufacturer not because of what they depicted. They also issued a warning notice to the unnamed Melbourne player who organised them.

A month later, Cameron Smith released his autobiography titled The Storm Within. In the book, Smith stated that the decisions made by the NRL during the salary cap scandal were unfair and that the players were "Hung out to dry", this prompted former NRL CEO David Gallop to respond stating that the NRL conducted a thorough investigation and that Smith was "just plain wrong" to complain about the punishments.

In November 2022, 12 years after the salary cap issues were discovered, Brian Waldron admitted that he was responsible for them.

I take full accountability for my role, as the chief of the business the buck stops with me and right from the start I’m very remorseful and sorry for what happened. As CEO I ran an organisation that did some things that were wrong and outside the rules of the game and we pushed the boundaries.

— Brian Waldron, CEO of Melbourne Storm 2005–2010, Foxsports.com.au

In round 22 of the 2023 NRL season, Melbourne celebrated 25 years as a club in the NRL with their game being played against Parramatta at Docklands Stadium. Before the match, the club released a promotional poster detailing the club had won six premierships, including the 2007 and 2009 stripped titles, the latter where they defeated Parramatta in the 2009 NRL Grand Final.

To this day Melbourne Storm still display replica trophies of the 2007 and 2009 premierships at their head office at AAMI park.

== See also ==
- Carlton Football Club salary cap breach
