= History of the North Queensland Cowboys =

The history of the North Queensland Cowboys goes back to 1995 when they were admitted to the Australian Rugby League Premiership.

== History ==
=== Foley Shield Days ===
In North Queensland fierce rivalry between clubs and towns quickly became a feature of the game. To play for your town, North Queensland, Queensland Country, Queensland and ultimately Australia quickly became the dream of every northern player. In south Queensland the "Bulimba cup" competition between Toowoomba, Brisbane and Ipswich teams was the major competition in Queensland rugby league well into the 1970s. When the opportunity arose, other regions in the state, including North Queensland, relished the chance to prove themselves against one of these sides. The first indication of the strength of North Queensland rugby league came in 1921 when the Townsville representative team, captained by Arch Foley, defeated Bulimba Cup champions Toowoomba. The celebrations after this victory were long and hard.

Such a victory caused the rest of the rugby league world to begin to take notice of North Queensland's rugby league ability. The flagship of North Queensland rugby league quickly became the "A" grade inter town competition, which until 1948 was called the "Carlton Cup". This was revamped and renamed the 'Foley Shield' in 1948, in recognition of Arch Foley's dedication and contribution to the sport. Few northern rugby league identities are remembered as well as Arch Foley. Apart from representing Queensland in 1915 and captaining the Townsville representative sides until the 1920s, he was instrumental, along with Queensland Rugby League Secretary Harry Sunderland, securing a match between North Queensland and the 1928 touring Great Britain team. This was to be the first ever clash between the region and Great Britain, as the previous tour in 1924 only went as far north as Rockhampton. This match, played at the Townsville Sports Reserve, was a huge boost to rugby league in North Queensland. The Foley Shield competition involved two zones - "Northern" - involving Cairns, Babinda, Tully and Eacham - and "Southern" with Mackay, Ayr, and Townsville. In 1949 the "Central" zone was included involving Herbert River, Charters Towers and Home Hill. With the region's prosperity derived predominantly from sugar cane, mining and cattle, rugby league prospered. Most towns had club competitions involving three or more clubs, and gaining selection in a Foley Shield side to represent these towns was a great honour. The Foley Shield final played in Townsville became a highlight of the rugby league calendar, with many southern talent scouts and coaches attending to see the North's players in action. Despite the game's success in North Queensland, it was still generally harder for a North or Central Queensland player to be selected for higher honours simply because of the "out of Sight, out of mind" scenario. This was especially the case prior to the 1950s. Apart from 1915 when seven North Queensland based players (all from Townsville) made the Queensland side, most Queensland sides up until the 1948 involved players from Toowoomba, Brisbane or Ipswich.

Players like Harry "Mucka" Fewin (Australia 1920) and Cec Aynsley (Australia 1924–28), both North Queenslanders, made their Queensland and Australian appearances from Brisbane, while Jim Bennett (Australia 1924) had played in Cairns in 1920, but again wasn't selected for his state or country until he returned to the Bulimba Cup competition. Often the only chance a northern based player had of impressing Queensland or Australian selectors was if he made the Queensland Country side, (featuring Central, and North Queensland plus Wide Bay players) to play a South Queensland team made up of Bulimba Cup players. It was a huge boost when Townsville's Bill Glasheen became the first North Queensland player to be selected for Australia when named in the 1933 Kangaroo touring squad to England. Townsville's "Frosty" Benton became the second Northern based International when selected for the 1948 Kangaroo touring squad.

=== State League to the formation of a national team ===
By the 1980s the Foley Shield competition was still fiercely contested, however, North Queensland sides were also selected for the Queensland State League competition. North Queensland in 1984 became the first regional side to reach the State League finals, losing to a powerful Wynnum Manly side which included Wally Lewis and three former North Queenslanders who were by now Australian representatives in Gene Miles, Colin Scott (both Townsville) and Greg Dowling (Ingham). One of the 1984 North Queensland players was 17-year-old Dale Shearer from Sarina. During the 1980s and early 1990s, North Queensland teams continued to compete in the State League competition, becoming the first regional side to win in 1991 under Coach Kerry Boustead. North Queensland's captain Laurie Spina was a veteran of eight years of Sydney football before returning home to Ingham.

During 1989 Townsville rugby league administrators successfully hosted a televised National Panasonic Cup match between the Brisbane Broncos and Parramatta, attracting 16,000 spectators to the Townsville Sports reserve. This match was such a resounding success, reflecting the passion North Queenslanders had for rugby league, that journalist Doug Kingston was inspired to write a newspaper column suggesting the time was ripe for a North Queensland side to bid for inclusion in the major Rugby League competition, the NSWRL, just like Brisbane and the Gold Coast had done the year before. Some of the region's former rugby league Internationals had also suggested for some time that the North be recognised nationally in this way.

Wheels were set in motion towards realising this dream, with Executive Chairman of North Queensland Newspapers Ron McLean adding his valued support. After a survey was conducted to gauge public support returned an overwhelming positive response, a major step was taken with the appointment of a promotions manager for the North Queensland bid. Former International Kerry Boustead was appointed to this task in 1990. Having widespread community, business and political support, the initial North Queensland bid committee, chaired by McLean, worked tirelessly to produce a strong case for North Queensland's inclusion. The old Willows Paceway was offered by Queensland Sports Minister Bob Gibbs to the fledgling club, with local developers such as Joe Goicoechea and Laurence Lancini taking on the redevelopment of this site.

This became a major factor in the success of North Queensland's bid and widespread celebrations occurred in November 1992 with the announcement that three new clubs would join Auckland for inclusion into the "Australian Rugby League" competition, the North Queensland Cowboys being one of them. From the outset, newly appointed coach Grant Bell and his team set out to develop a club based on local talent, mixed with some experienced players from the south; a pattern that was so successful decades before in the north. The club included predominantly country bred footballers. Many of the experienced southern players signed were in fact North Queenslanders returning home.

=== 1995, 1996: Origins ===
The Cowboys name and team colours were decided by public competition in 1994. One of the major difficulties that faced the club in their early years was attracting followers from the more established Queensland-based Winfield Cup side, the Brisbane Broncos. This was exacerbated by an initial lack of onfield success and stability. In their first two seasons, the Cowboys had eight different captains.

=== 1997: Super League ===
After much court action in 1995 and 1996, a ten team Super League competition was held in 1997. The Cowboys competed in this competition, and their squad was bolstered by a number of new signings including Ian Roberts and Steve Walters. However, they were unable to improve on the club's results in previous years, and for the second time in three seasons they were to finish the season in last place.

=== 1998, 1999: National Rugby League ===
In 1998 the Super League and Australian Rugby League competitions merged to form the National Rugby League (NRL). The Cowboys began their first season in this competition strongly, and after six rounds they were in equal first place. Although they fell away later in the season, they were to record the largest come-back to date in an Australian first grade rugby league match, defeating the Penrith Panthers 36–28 after trailing 26–0 at half-time. 1998 also saw the Cowboys record their largest loss to date, being defeated 62–0 by the North Sydney Bears in the last round of the home and away season.

The Cowboys signed their eleventh captain in 1999, Noel Goldthorpe. Paul Bowman was also to serve in that role during the season. Although their on-field performances were not spectacular, continuing high attendance figures saw aggregate attendances exceed one million spectators. This season the Cowboys also provided their first State of Origin representative when Paul Green was selected as Queensland's halfback for game 2 of the 1999 State of Origin series.

=== 2000–2003: Improved Results ===
In the years 2000 through to 2002 the Cowboys continued to struggle with off-field dramas and poor on-field performances. After finishing last in 2000 and second last the following year, four losses at the start of the 2002 season saw coach Tim Sheens sacked and replaced by his assistant Murray Hurst. Although they finished in their highest position to date, coach Hurst was also sacked at early in the 2003 season, and replaced by Graham Murray. The Cowboys spent much of the 2003 season in the top eight with much improved performances from a host of players, including local talents Matt Bowen and Josh Hannay. The 2003 season ended with the Cowboys four points adrift of a top eight play-off position.

=== 2004: First time finalists ===
After the first three rounds of the 2004 season, Cowboy supporters had little reason to smile. A first round loss to Manly at home, followed by two more home losses and a bye until the first away game of the season against Cronulla in round five saw the first win of the season. By round seven, with just one win and five losses, the Cowboys held a disappointing 13th position on the premiership ladder. Then came another away win, this time over Parramatta, which history can record as a turning point in the club's most successful season to date. By the end of the 26 round season, the Cowboys had won 12, drawn one (the first ever draw in the NRL in the age of golden point) and lost 11, but more importantly, they held 7th position and a first ever top eight appearance.

It was a tough road to success in 2004 with injuries again taking key players out of action, including Matt Sing who suffered a broken jaw in the State of Origin series and Glenn Morrison who suffered a broken back mid season. A sure sign of the growing stature of the club was evident when new players were able to step up to the top squad from the Young Guns to cover such injuries. Players like Shane Tronc and Steve Southern were fine examples of first grade debutantes who replaced injured players and went on to play significant roles in the club's success of 2004. The finals series proved to be of immense importance to the Club and the North Queensland community.

Not only did long-term supporters have much to cheer about, but the Cowboys also captured the imagination of rugby league supporters throughout Australia with their charge into the final series. Remarkably, the Cowboys' new status in the game afforded them their first free-to-air televised game in their history. Whilst Channel Nine had all but ignored the Townsville-based team, a place in the finals had the public beating the drum for coverage. This provided Channel Nine with a last minute opportunity to jump on the Cowboys bandwagon, with Nine Commentator Ray "Rabbits" Warren branding the Cowboys as "2004's fairytale team". But for many fans throughout Queensland and in other states, such accolades were all too late from the NRL's chief free-to-air television provider who had failed to deliver coverage of the national competition. In just three finals matches, the Cowboys tasted victories over eventual premiers the Bulldogs and the Brisbane Broncos before losing narrowly to Sydney City. The semi final against the Brisbane Broncos, played in front of a packed Dairy Farmers Stadium, gave the Cowboys a chance to thank their long-term supporters, as well as welcome many new ones.

After scenes at the Townsville airport before and after the victory over the Canterbury Bulldogs, the Cowboys played at home against the Broncos. After defeating the Broncos, they travelled to Sydney to meet eventual grand finalists Sydney Roosters and came within seconds of winning a grand final berth. Losing the preliminary final by just 16–19, the Cowboys had come of age in 2004. Apart from going within a match of a grand final appearance, the club also maintained its record of producing representative players. The 2004 Cowboys had a good away match record.

=== 2005: Grand finalists ===
2005 would be recorded as the best ever in the club's 11-year history. The tone of the season was set in round two, when after a first round away loss to the Brisbane Broncos, the North Queensland Toyota Cowboys won their first home match, defeating defending premiers Canterbury Bulldogs with an emphatic 24–12 win. New recruit Carl Webb set the scene by scoring a classic try, reminiscent of his 2001 Origin performance, and for most of the season the Cowboys were in a similar winning frame of mind, with a hard edge to their flamboyant attacking style, matched by solid defence.

Intermittent losses punctuated the first half of the season, but leading up to Origin time the Cowboys were a dominant force, reflected in the selection of six players plus trainer Billy Johnstone in the Queensland Origin campaign. A real highlight of the season before the finals series was a huge away win three days after the first Origin match, again against Canterbury, played at the Gold coast. The speed, agility and combination of the Cowboys was simply brilliant as they swept aside the 2004 premiers for a second time in the season 48–12, with five of their players backing up after a gruelling Origin encounter. A massive victory over the Cronulla Sharks the following week meant that in the first 13 rounds of the season, the Cowboys had won eight and lost just three matches.

A "flat" patch followed, however, as in the second half of the season the team began to struggle slightly with injury and suspension and recorded six wins and six losses plus a bye. Three wins came in the last three rounds of the regular season to cement a 5th spot finish and a place in the finals series campaign for the second year running. Alarm bells sounded, however, when in the first semi final, the Cowboys were hammered 6–50 by the Wests Tigers, and only favourable outcomes by other teams in the same finals round kept their campaign alive. The character and resolve of the team was very evident when they bounced back a week later with a well constructed defeat of the Melbourne Storm, putting their finals campaign back on track. A superb effort followed with the shutting out premiership favourites Parramatta in the preliminary final through a 29–0 win to book a place in the 2005 NRL Grand Final. This brilliant preliminary final victory was the biggest win by any club in such a match since 1982 when ironically Parramatta defeated the Roosters 33–0. In addition, by this preliminary final the Cowboys were the only side remaining in contention from the top four of the 2004 season.

Grand Final fever hit North Queensland in style as thousands of supporters travelled to Sydney for the big day and again the team travelled to the airport via the city to allow the legion of fans, especially school children, to cheer on the side. The 2005 Grand Final had a special feel to it as two relative new football club entities, both representing districts and regions steeped in rugby league history and folklore took to the field for the decider. The West Tigers ran out eventual 30–16 winners, but the Cowboys did their fans and communities proud in the way they played the game, and also off the field, in the way they presented themselves, both as a team and as individuals. In the Queensland Wizard Cup, the depth of the North Queensland Toyota Cowboys club was evident when the North Queensland Toyota Young Guns won the competition grand final 34–4 over the Burleigh Bears. This victory at Suncorp Stadium provided inspiration to the senior side just hours before their clash with the Melbourne Storm in the major semi final. To cap a fine season, Cowboys Luke O'Donnell was named in the Kangaroo squad to play the Tri-Nations series, including the tour of England, while Billy Johnstone continued his role as Australian team trainer. In other representative matches Graham Murray continued to coach City in the annual NSW City/Country clash. The North Queensland Toyota Cowboys banner flew high over the rugby league landscape after season 2005.

=== 2006/2007 ===
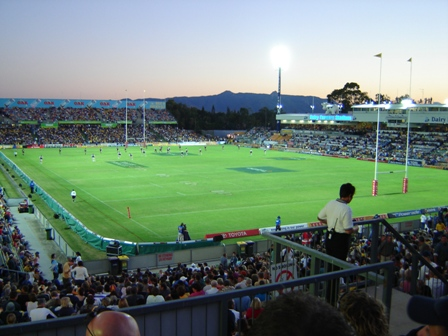
Dairy Farmers Stadium is the home ground of the North Queensland Cowboys. It hosted two qualifying finals in 2007.

The Cowboys started off the year by winning 6 straight games. One of the teams they defeated were to become the premiers, the Brisbane Broncos (in fact, the Cowboys beat them twice during the season, the second time was in a match Johnathan Thurston got seriously injured). They then fell into a hole, winning only 5 of the last 19 games, making them finish 9th on the ladder, just missing out of the finals. Much criticism has been directed at coach Murray for not sticking with a stable scrumbase pairing throughout 2006, with a number of players such as Brett Firman and Brent McConnell seen as unable to support the talents of playmaker Johnathan Thurston. The Cowboys finished the final round of regular season with a convincing win over the Parramatta Eels to give their fans some hope for 2007. Particularly impressive were hooker Aaron Payne and fullback Matthew Bowen, who recaptured some of his magic and regained some much needed form heading into the off season. Other players who have impressed throughout 2006 include Australian representative player Luke O'Donnell, as well as Carl Webb who struggled for much of the year with injuries. The ever reliable Paul Bowman continued to show the hard-fought spirit of the team despite a neck injury that struck him down at the close of the season. Aaron Payne also capped off a strong year for the club to be named Cowboy of the Year for 2006. 2006 also saw the departure of several key personal, including legendary strength and conditioner Billy Johnstone – to the Gold Coast Titans – and assistant coach Neil Henry accepted a head coaching position with the Canberra Raiders. The Cowboys announced that tough talking former English Super League coach Ian Millward would replace Henry as Graham Murray's assistant, with Glen Murphy taking over from Johnstone.

Season 2007 may well go down as the 'one that got away' as the North Queensland Toyota Cowboys started the season strongly and went on to record 15 wins and nine losses in the premiership rounds, finishing in the top four to claim a home semi final. Only a loss to Manly in the preliminary final ruled out a second grand final appearance. A spate of injuries failed to stifle the club's success, thanks in part to several players really stepping up to take the place of injured personnel.

First Luke O’Donnell missed most of the season, then Carl Webb, Steve Southern, Shane Tronc and Sione Faumuina were missing at key times through injury. They were replaced by players considered fringe first graders at the start of season 2007 – Ben Vaeau, Matt Bartlett, Sam Faust and Ray Cashmere. All stood up to be counted and proved they were equal to the task, with Ray Cashmere in particular winning a legion of fans with his spirited play at the back end of the season while Sam Faust proved he is a player of the future. Personal success came the way of captain Johnathan Thurston in 2007 as he claimed a second Dally M medal as well as representing both Queensland and Australia.

The player of the season though was Matthew Bowen. Scoring 22 tries in 27 appearances, this was perhaps the Origin representative's finest NRL season so far. Paul Bowman, the last of the 1995 Cowboys, retired after 13 years of service and a club record of 203 first grade games at the end of 2007. He was given a rousing farewell by the home crowd and took on a coaching role with the club in 2008. Another player to retire after season 2007 was Jason Smith. Although only playing one season with the Cowboys, he provided sound experience and leadership to the 2007 squad. Jason's first grade career spanned 17 seasons, with 16 test matches for Australia and 16 Origin appearances for Queensland. He was also the last player still playing NRL to play in the very first Cowboys match on 11 March 1995, when he was with the Canterbury Bulldogs. There were some low points to the season apart from the injury toll, mainly three big losses which blew out the 'for' and 'against' scores record.

The overall success of the club outweighed these uncharacteristic losses though, and by the time the semi-final series began, confidence was high. After mauling the Warriors in the home semi final, the Cowboys went into the preliminary final full of confidence, but it wasn't to be. History was also made in the Queensland cup with the 2007 Toyota Young Guns the last ever to compete in the Queensland Cup. The final Toyota Young Guns season ended in similar fashion to the NRL squad, going down in the preliminary final and finishing third, with captain Shane Muspratt leading Queensland in the Residents' clash. For season 2008 both Cairns and Mackay will field sides, with former Young Guns spread between the two centres.

After helping the Cowboys through a difficult period, in 2007 News Limited sold the football club to the Cowboys Leagues Club for an undisclosed sum after several months of negotiations, ending News' six-year stint as owner of the Cowboys.

=== 2008–2010: Struggling Seasons ===
The 2008 NRL Season was seen as a very tough year for the Cowboys. Before the season began, the club announced head coach Graham Murray's contract would not be renewed. This resulted in the clubs downfall. After only winning three of the first ten games, Murray resigned from his job. The club then confirmed assistant coach Ian Millward would take over the duties for the rest of the season. During his stint as head coach, the club could only win two more games. This season saw the club break their previous record of 10 consecutive losses by losing 13 straight matches from round 4 until the club broke the record in round 22 by beating the Canterbury Bulldogs 36–12. The Cowboys throughout the season were decimated by injuries and suspensions as well as off-field issues. In the end, the Cowboys finished 15th on the ladder avoiding the wooden spoon by for and against. The club did have some positives with Johnathan Thurston named in the 2008 Rugby League World Cup squad for Australia as well as being picked for Queensland along with Carl Webb and Jacob Lillyman.

2009 saw the appointment of Neil Henry as head coach which saw some hope for the club after winning NRL Coach of the Year with the Canberra Raiders the previous year. Throughout the year, the club were poised to make the finals however, the club slumped the consecutive losses to miss out on playing in the finals for the second straight year. 2009 also saw Matthew Bowen score his 100th try becoming the first Cowboy to score 100 tries for the club.

The beginning out the 2010 season was the speculation of whether Johnathan Thurston would renew his contract with the club. This included the club signing Thurston's friend and former teammate Willie Mason. Thurston did renew for another three seasons however it brought very little success. The club finished 15th however, the club would have received the wooden spoon if Melbourne Storm did not lose all of their competition points. 2010 saw the emergence of Scott Bolton and seeing the test debut of Matthew Scott. Also the club had a new record with Jason Taumalolo making his debut against the Canterbury Bulldogs in round 24 aged 17 years and 82 days.

=== 2011–2013: Return to the Finals ===
After missing the finals for the last 3 seasons the Cowboys underwent a major overhaul of personnel for the 2011 season. Club legend Ty Williams retired and they parted ways with club favourites Luke O'Donnell, Carl Webb and Steve Southern. Their biggest signing for the 2011 season was Queensland and Australian representative centre Brent Tate. They also made key recruits in the signings of former Melbourne Storm and Queensland State of Origin representative Dallas Johnson and premiership winner Glenn Hall from the English Super League, re-signing a former Cowboy in Gavin Cooper and picking up younger, experienced first graders such as Antonio Winterstein. Perhaps their most underrated off-season recruit at the time was the 20-year-old, 2010 Toyota Cup player of the year Tariq Sims, from the Brisbane Broncos. Sims, who joined the Cowboys with older brother Ashton, would have a stand out year in 2011. Being earmarked as a future NSW and Australian representative.

The Cowboys' new signings had a positive impact on the NRL team, with the Cowboys spending much of the year in the top four before a late slide dropped them to seventh position and giving them their first finals appearance since 2007. In the qualifying final, North Queensland led Manly 8–0 at half time before being overrun by the Sea Eagles who went on to claim the premiership. Winger Kalifa Faifai Loa made his debut for New Zealand at the end of the season, James Segeyaro and Ray Thompson made their debuts for Papua New Guinea and Joel Riethmuller represented Italy for the first time in the European qualifiers for the 2013 World Cup.

2012 saw the Cowboys return to the finals after finishing in 5th spot. They faced the Broncos in the first week of the finals, winning 33–16, with halfback Michael Morgan scoring a hat trick. They lost the following week to Manly, in controversial circumstances. Club legend Aaron Payne retired at the end of the season, after 10 years with the team.

The Cowboys again made the finals in 2013, the first time the club had made the finals series three straight years, when they finished in 8th place. After a poor start to the season, the side went on a 6-game winning streak following the sacking of coach Neil Henry. They were eliminated in Week 1 of the finals, after a controversial loss to the Cronulla Sharks. Club legend Matthew Bowen played his last season in the NRL, announcing he would be taking up an offer with Super League side, the Wigan Warriors. Club stalwarts Ashley Graham and Dallas Johnson also announced their retirements.

On 1 October 2013, former Cowboys halfback Paul Green was announced as head coach for the 2014 and 2015 seasons, becoming the first former Cowboys player to coach the club.

=== 2014 – Current: A new era and the club's first NRL Telstra premiership ===
The Cowboys started their 2014 season by winning the inaugural NRL Auckland Nines tournament which was held at Eden Park in Auckland. After losing key signing Lachlan Coote early in the tournament to injury, the Cowboys went on to face the Brisbane Broncos in the final, defeating them 16–7 to claim the trophy and a prize money cheque of $370,000. Cowboys winger Kyle Feldt was awarded the Breakout Player of the Tournament award, while Gavin Cooper, Kane Linnett, James Tamou and Antonio Winterstein were named in the Team of the Tournament.

The Cowboys finished in 5th place in 2014, with a rocky start to the season and a string of injuries to key players including internationals Brent Tate and Matt Scott, The Cowboys made a late charge to the finals winning the majority of their games and cementing a spot in the finals where they defeated the Brisbane Broncos 32–20 at their home ground in Townsville. They then travelled to Sydney to face the 2013 premiers the Sydney Roosters in the second week of the finals where they were defeated 31–30. After coming back from an early 30-point deficit Johnathan Thurston appeared to score with 56 seconds remaining before being ruled a no try by the officials ending their charge to the grand final – the third consecutive year that the Cowboys had been eliminated from the finals in controversial fashion.

The Cowboys farewelled Brent Tate (retired), Ashton Sims (Warrington Wolves), Tariq Sims (Newcastle Knights) and Curtis Rona (Canterbury-Bankstown Bulldogs) at the end of the season.

On 26 September 2015, the Cowboys qualified for only their second grand final defeating Melbourne 32–12 in the Preliminary Final in Melbourne. In the final, they beat the Brisbane Broncos in extra time in one of the closest grand finals in history, ending with a final score of 17–16. The game was won by a 'golden point' field goal taken by Johnathan Thurston on the fourth tackle of the first set of extra time, allowing the North Queensland Cowboys to win their first ever grand final. Thurston had helped create the last minute try that tied the game in regular time and then scraped the post as his conversion attempt was unsuccessful. Johnathan Thurston took home the Clive Churchill Medal for best on ground in the Grand Final.
