= Brett Hodgson =

Australian rugby league footballer and coach

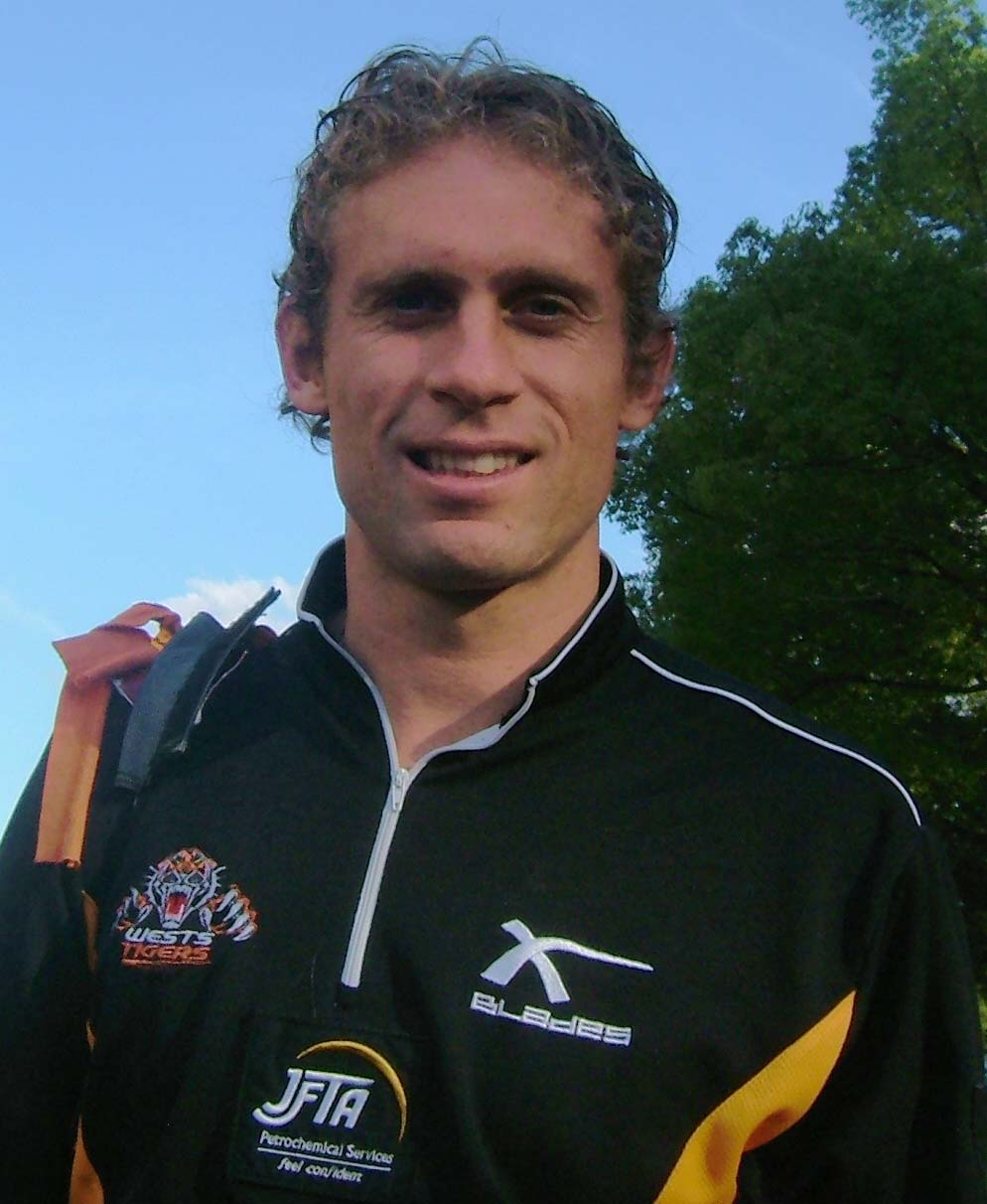
- Hodgson with the Wests Tigers in 2005

Personal information
- Born: 12 February 1978 (age 48) Liverpool, New South Wales, Australia
- Height: 175 cm (5 ft 9 in)
- Weight: 78 kg (12 st 4 lb)

Playing information
- Position: Fullback, Wing
Club
Years	Team	Pld	T	G	FG	P
1997–99	Western Suburbs	49	18	37	1	147
2000–03	Parramatta Eels	73	36	106	0	356
2004–08	Wests Tigers	103	39	318	0	792
2009–10	Huddersfield Giants	51	16	182	0	428
2011–13	Warrington Wolves	75	39	314	2	786
	Total	351	148	957	3	2509
Representative
Years	Team	Pld	T	G	FG	P
2001–08	City NSW	6	0	4	0	8
2002–06	New South Wales	6	1	5	0	14
2011–13	Exiles	3	2	4	0	16

Coaching information
Club
Years	Team	Gms	W	D	L	W%
2021–22	Hull FC	64	25	1	38	39
- Source: As of 22 Aug 2022

Brett Hodgson (born 12 February 1978) is an Australian rugby league coach and former professional player during the 1990s, 2000s and 2010s.

A New South Wales State of Origin representative goal-kicking fullback, he played his club football in the NRL for the Western Suburbs Magpies, the Parramatta Eels and the Wests Tigers, with whom he won the 2005 NRL premiership. He played in the Super League for the Huddersfield Giants, with whom he won the 2009 Man of Steel Award, and the Warrington Wolves, with whom he won both the Challenge Cup and the Lance Todd Trophy. Hodgson also gained representative selection for the Exiles and City NSW.

== Background ==
Hodgson was born in Liverpool, New South Wales, Australia.

== Playing career ==
=== Western Suburbs Magpies ===
An Ingleburn RSL (Campbelltown) junior, Hodgson was graded to the Western Suburbs Magpies. He made his first-grade début under coach Tommy Raudonikis in round 11 of the 1997 ARL season, when Wests met the South Queensland Crushers at Campbelltown Stadium. He later said, "In my first game I was on the bench and didn’t get on until the 78th minute because Tommy forgot I was on the sidelines. Paul Langmack came off, grabbed the walkie-talkie and said: 'Tommy, you've got [Hodgson] down here, are you going to put him on?' Tommy asked me where I wanted to play and I said fullback. He said, 'Righto, off you go.'" After a further game on the bench, Hodgson moved to the wing for the remainder of the season. In his first game in the starting side, he scored two tries in a win against Sydney City.

In 1998, Hodgson played wing, halfback and fullback. He scored ten tries from his 19 appearances, though the Magpies only won four of those games. In round 12, he scored his first hat-trick, in a 36–24 win over the Adelaide Rams. Securing a spot at fullback in 1999, the Magpies' last season before merging with Balmain to become the Wests Tigers in 2000, he played a further 19 games.

Hodgson later said his departure from the club was influenced by Balmain coach Wayne Pearce being appointed the joint venture's inaugural head coach over Raudonikis: "I got offered a deal to stay at Wests Tigers when they first merged. I had a conversation with Tommy that I was going to stay. I felt my loyalties lay with Tommy and I took less money to go to Parramatta. I had a lot of respect for Wayne Pearce ... but I had a lot of loyalty to Tommy. The rest is history."

In 2008, Hodgson was the last remaining former Western Suburbs Magpies' footballer playing in the NRL, before the return of John Skandalis in 2009, and Ray Cashmere in 2012.

=== Parramatta Eels ===
In 1999, Hodgson signed with Parramatta Eels for the 2000 NRL season. Hodgson's season was cut short following a high tackle from Cronulla's Mitch Healey, breaking his jaw.

The 2001 season was a successful one for Hodgson and Parramatta Eels. Hodgson was selected for City Origin and the club made it to the grand final. Described as a "lethal, attacking full-back", Hodgson played as a fullback and scored two tries in the Parramatta Eels's loss to the Newcastle Knights in the 2001 NRL grand final. During his time at the Eels, Hodgson was the recipient of Gorden Tallis' famous slingshot tackle, whilst was representing NSW in the 2002 State of Origin series. In 2003, Hodgson's final year at the Parramatta Eels was cut short in round 16 with a rib injury.

=== Wests Tigers ===
Hodgson returned to Campbelltown when he signed with the Wests Tigers in 2004. Taking over goal-kicking duties, a position he had sometimes filled in previous seasons, he scored 194 points for the year.

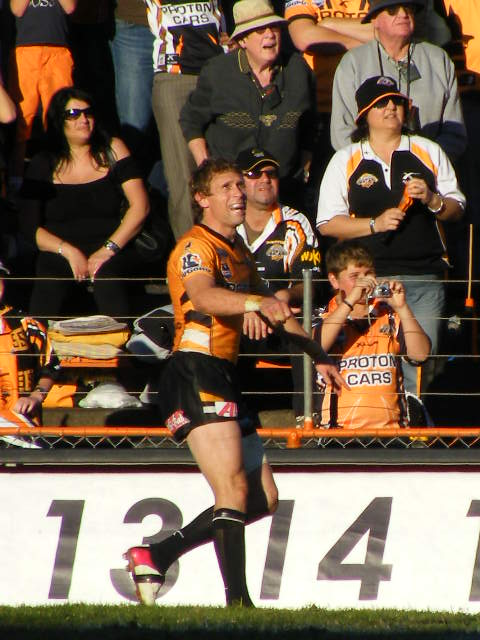
Hodgson playing for Wests in 2008

In round 24 of the 2005 season, Hodgson scored a club record 22 points during a 54-2 flogging of the Bulldogs. Three weeks later, he broke his own record, scoring 30 points against the Cowboys. Hodgson's successful 2005 season resulted in the Dally M Fullback of the Year and the NRL competition's leading pointscorer with 308 points, the most points ever scored by a fullback in one season. He went on to play and kick five goals in the Tigers' 2005 NRL Grand Final victory over the North Queensland Cowboys. As NRL Premiers Wests faced Super League champions Bradford Bulls in the 2006 World Club Challenge. Hodgson played as a fullback, scoring a try and kicking one goal in the Tigers' 30–10 loss.

On 23 July 2006, midway through the first half of the clash between Wests Tigers and his former club, Parramatta Eels, Hodgson sustained medial and cruciate ligament injuries and was sidelined for the remainder of the season. In Round 12 of 2007, Hodgson fractured his cheekbone in the match against the Parramatta Eels. After surgery to repair the fracture, Hodgson was sidelined for seven rounds and returned in Round 20 for his 200th first-grade game, a resounding win against the North Queensland Cowboys.

Salary cap restraints at the Wests Tigers forced Hodgson to look elsewhere for a contract for the 2009 season. Hodgson said his departure was, "through lack of opportunity in Australia. There was absolutely nothing here. If you've been in the game seven, eight, nine or 10 years I think there needs to be some sort of [salary cap] allowance."

Hodgson played his last game for the Wests Tigers on 7 September 2008 and although the club failed to make the top eight, they did send Hodgson out with a win against the Gold Coast Titans, 28–12. Hodgson was named Man of the Match. At the club's end of season awards, Hodgson was voted the Members' Player of the Year for 2008.

In 2015, Hodgson was named a Wests Tigers' life member.

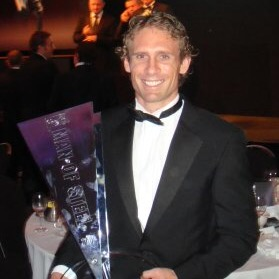
Hodgson in 2009 after receiving the Man of Steel Award.

=== Huddersfield Giants ===
Hodgson signed a two-year deal to play in the UK for Huddersfield Giants from 2009. In February 2009, Hodgson was named team captain, replacing Chris Thorman. He played for Huddersfield Giants as a fullback in the 2009 Challenge Cup final, as they lost to Warrington Wolves.

Hodgson was awarded with the Super League's 'Man of Steel' Award after his first season with Huddersfield Giants, becoming only the fourth Australian to win the prestigious award since it was introduced in 1977. In April 2010 it was announced that Hodgson has signed for Super League rivals Warrington Wolves from 2011 on a two-year contract. His final day as an official Huddersfield Giants player was on 7 October 2010.

=== Warrington Wolves ===
Hodgson become the first choice fullback for Warrington Wolves in the 2011 Super League season. Hodgson was selected for the Exiles squad for the inaugural Rugby League International Origin Match against England. Hodgson was selected by Exiles coach Brian McLennan to play as a fullback. He had a solid game and helped the Exiles win the first International Origin 16–12. He led the Warrington Wolves to the league leader's shield, but they fell at the quarter-final stage of the Challenge Cup (to Wigan) and semi-final stage of the Super League play-offs (to Leeds). Due to an injury early in the 2012 season, and a rotation policy, he shared fullback duties with Stefan Ratchford, being used mainly for the more important games. Two days before Warrington Wolves beat Wigan Warriors 30–10 in the league, it was announced that ten Warrington Wolves players had signed contract extensions, including Hodgson for a further two years, taking him to the end of the 2014 season when he would be 36.

Hodgson was instrumental as he led Warrington Wolves to the 2012 Challenge Cup Final victory over the Leeds Rhinos at Wembley Stadium. The win was their 3rd in 4 years (Hodgson's first Challenge Cup winners medal) on 25 August, beating Leeds Rhinos 35–18 in the final, Hodgson scoring a try and kicking 5 goals as he also he became only the 4th Australian to win the Lance Todd Trophy man of the match award.

He played in the 2012 Super League Grand Final defeat by the Leeds Rhinos at Old Trafford.

Hodgson was selected as captain of the Exiles with former captain Danny Buderus moving back to Australia, new coach Daniel Anderson selected Hodgson as a fullback however an injury kept him out of Game 1 in which his side lost 18–10. He featured as a fullback for Game 2 and took over captaincy from stand in captain Thomas Leuluai, Hodgson lead his team to a 32–20 win to retain the trophy and scored 2 tries and kicked 4 goals in the process.

=== Highlights ===
- First Grade Debut: 1997 – Round 11, Western Suburbs Magpies v South Queensland Crushers, Campbelltown Stadium, Sydney, 18 May.
- Premierships: 2005 – Wests Tigers defeated North Queensland Cowboys 30–16 in the Grand Final, Stadium Australia, Sydney, 2 October.
- Wests Tigers Club Captain: 2006–2008
- NSW City Origin Debut: 2001 – NSW City Origin v NSW Country Origin, Carrington Park, Bathurst, New South Wales, 8 June.
- NSW City Origin Selection: 2001–02, 2004–06, 2008
- NSW City Origin Captain: 2008
- New South Wales Debut: 2002 – State of Origin Game 1, New South Wales v Queensland, Stadium Australia, Sydney, 22 May.
- New South Wales Selection: 2002, 2006
- Exiles Debut: 2011 – International Origin Match, England RL vs Exiles RL, Headingley, Leeds, 10 June.
- Exiles Selection: 2011, 2012

== Coaching career ==
Hodgson left the Wolves at the end of the 2013 season to join both Hull F.C. and the Widnes Vikings as a coaching consultant for the season ahead. Hodgson also served as the kicking consultant for Sale Sharks Rugby Union Club. He was assistant coach at Widnes Vikings, as well as the head coach of the Widnes Vikings Academy Team.

Hodgson returned to Wests Tigers for the 2018 season as an assistant coach and head coach for the feeder team, the Western Suburbs Magpies. He said, "It's great to be back. I'm still living out at Campbelltown which is where I grew up. I've always wanted to be a coach. When you get to your late 20s and it's potentially coming to an end, you look to that next stage in your life. I'm really enjoying it so far."

On 25 November 2020, Hodgson was named as the new head coach of Hull F.C. Hodgson's reign at Hull F.C. got off to a good start as the club only lost once in their opening seven matches. However, the club ended the season winning only one game (against Hull Kingston Rovers) from the last nine fixtures to finish 8th on the table. In September 2022, Hodgson stepped down as head coach of Hull F.C. by mutual consent. The club finished ninth on the table and missed the playoffs for a second consecutive season.

In March 2023, Hodgson joined Eddie Jones' Wallabies coaching team as Defensive Coach. This came after Hodgson had previously been hired by Jones in the same role with England's national rugby union team until Jones was sacked in late 2022.

== Personal life ==
Hodgson and his wife Skye have two children; a daughter and a son.

== Sources ==
- Alan Whiticker & Glen Hudson (2007). The Encyclopedia of Rugby League Players. Wetherill Park, New South Wales: Gary Allen Pty Ltd. pp. s 241–242. ISBN 978-1-877082-93-1.
- Malcolm Andrews (2006). ABC of Rugby League. Sydney, New South Wales: ABC Books. p. 716. ISBN 978-0-7333-1946-4.
