= Todd Payten =

Australian RL coach & footballer

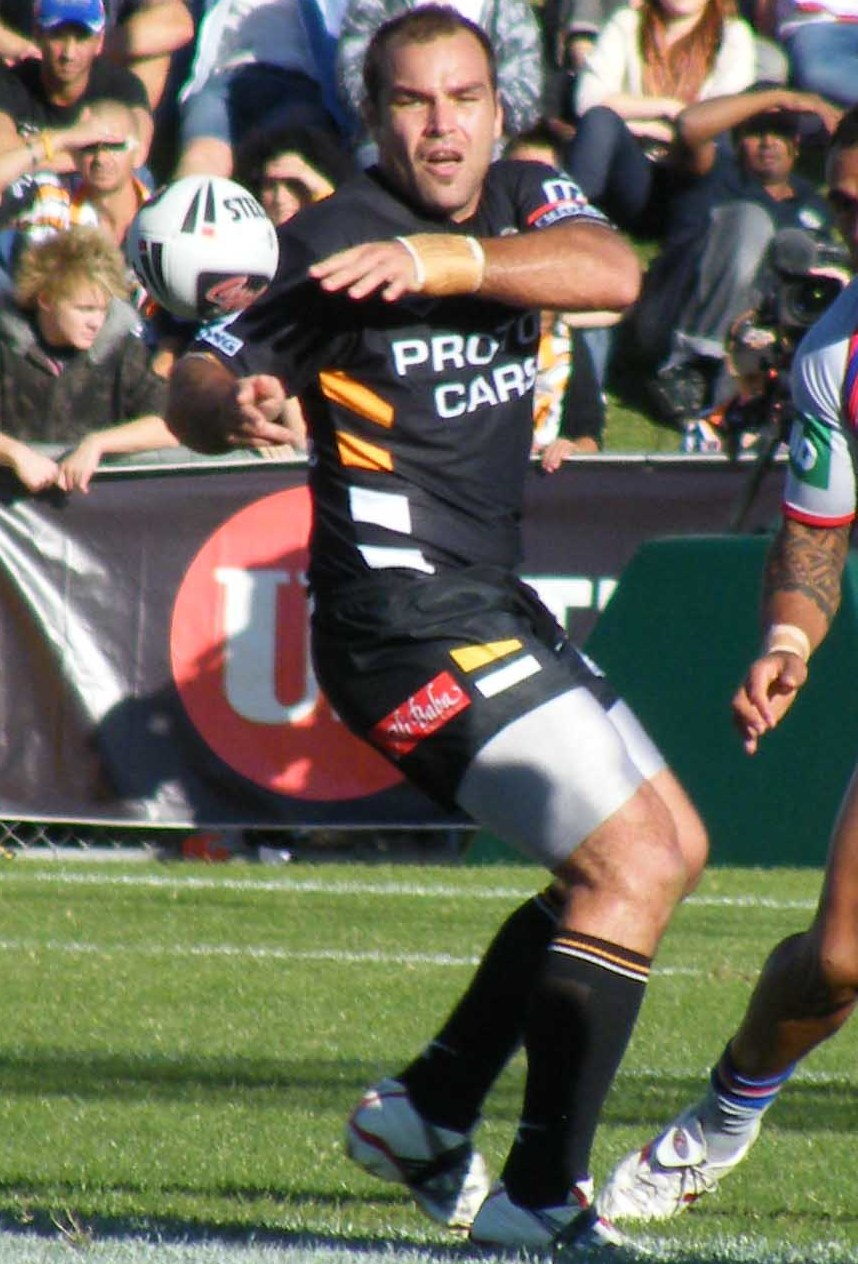

Personal information
- Full name: Todd Owen Payten
- Born: 18 January 1979 (age 47) Parramatta, New South Wales, Australia
- Height: 188 cm (6 ft 2 in)
- Weight: 110 kg (17 st 5 lb)

Playing information
- Position: Prop, Second-row
Club
Years	Team	Pld	T	G	FG	P
1996–02	Canberra Raiders	90	9	0	0	36
2003	Sydney Roosters	19	1	0	0	4
2004–11	Wests Tigers	151	9	0	0	36
	Total	260	19	0	0	76

Coaching information
Club
Years	Team	Gms	W	D	L	W%
2020	New Zealand Warriors	14	6	0	8	43
2021–	North Qld Cowboys	149	75	1	73	50
	Total	163	81	1	81	50
- Source: As of 12 September 2026

Todd Payten (born 18 January 1979) is an Australian professional rugby league coach who is the head coach of the North Queensland Cowboys in the National Rugby League (NRL) and former professional rugby league footballer.

As a player he played as a prop and second-row forward for the Canberra Raiders, Sydney Roosters and the Wests Tigers over his 16-year NRL career, winning a premiership with the Tigers in 2005. He previously coached the New Zealand Warriors for the 2020 NRL season.

== Background ==
Born in Sydney, New South Wales and raised in Temora, New South Wales, Payten played junior rugby league for the Temora Dragons before signing a scholarship with the Canberra Raiders when he was 16. While living in Canberra, he attended Erindale College, representing the Australian Schoolboys in 1996.

== Playing career ==
=== Canberra Raiders ===
In Round 18 of the 1996 ARL season, after playing just two reserve grade games, Payten made his first grade debut for the Raiders as a 17-year old in a 16–24 loss to the Western Suburbs Magpies. He played two games for the Raiders that year and represented the New South Wales under-17 team.

In 1997, Payten played 11 games for the Raiders, scoring his first try in a 26–38 loss to the Canterbury-Bankstown Bulldogs. Over the next two seasons, he gradually made more appearances for the Raiders, initially playing from the bench, until he cemented a position as starting prop in 2000. Over his seven seasons with the club, he played 90 games and in four finals series (1997, 1998, 2000, 2002).

=== Sydney Roosters ===
In 2003, having been released from the final two years of his contract with the Raiders, he joined the Sydney Roosters. His first game with the club was the 2003 World Club Challenge, coming off the bench and scored a try in the Roosters' 38–0 win over Super League champions St Helens R.F.C. In Round 14 of the 2003 NRL season, he played his 100th NRL game in a 15–14 win over the North Queensland Cowboys. He played 18 games for the Roosters in his lone season at the club, missing their run to the Grand Final after suffering a foot injury in their Round 23 win over the South Sydney Rabbitohs.

=== Wests Tigers ===
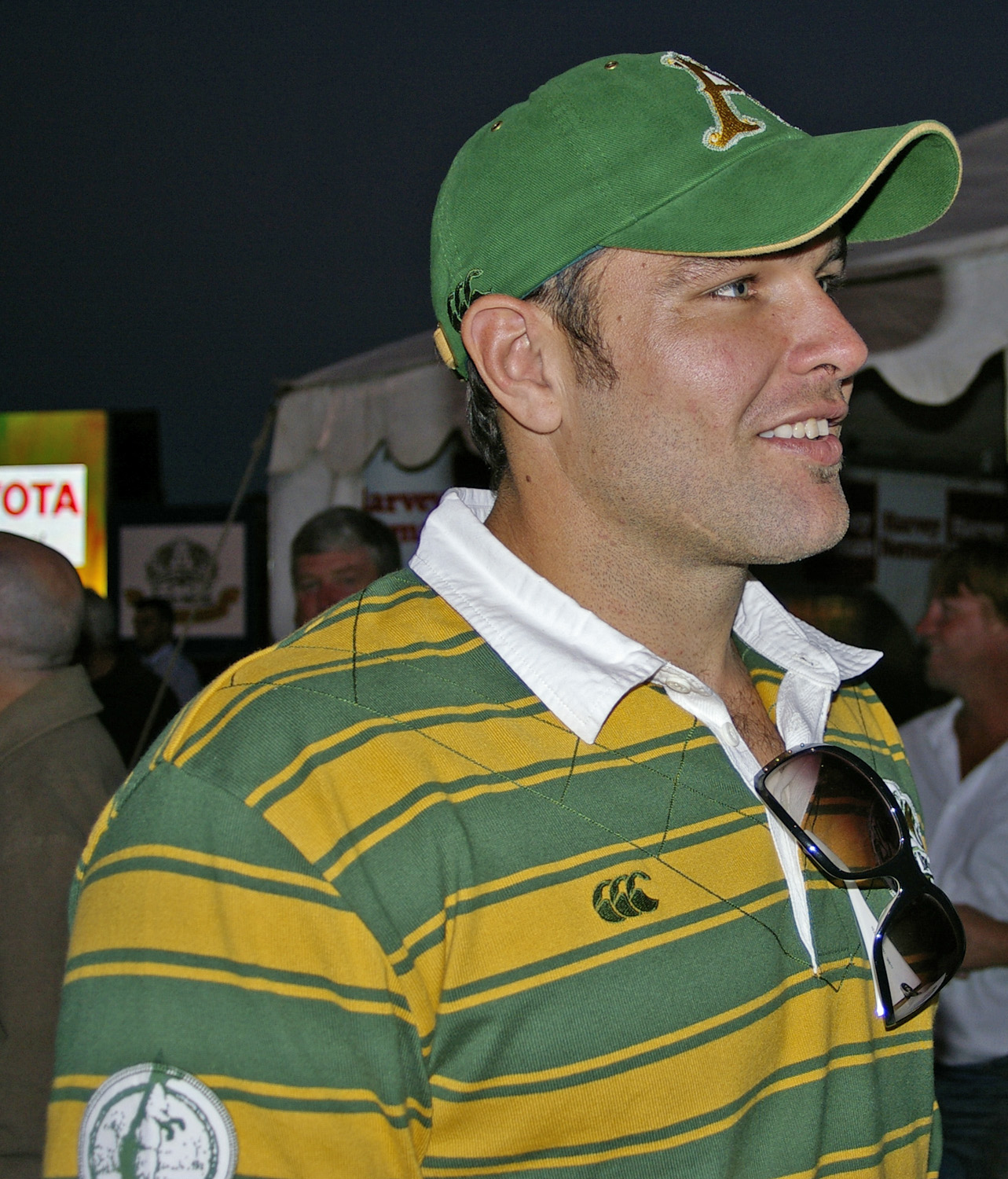
Payten in 2008

After being released by the Roosters, Payten joined the Wests Tigers in 2004, which meant he was being paid by three clubs. Coach Tim Sheens said of the signing, "We had players like Johnny Skandalis who could take the ball up but what we were looking for was someone with a little bit of nous around his game." In his first season with the club, he played 17 games.

On 2 October 2005, he came off the bench and scored the final try of the game in the Tigers' 30–16 win over the North Queensland Cowboys in the 2005 NRL Grand Final. In Round 21 of the 2008 NRL season, he played his 200th NRL game in a 56–4 win over the Canterbury-Bankstown Bulldogs.

In 2010, Payten was named in the Australian train-on squad for the Four Nations. During that year's semi finals, he suffered an injury to his ankle when he stepped on a tennis ball. He took no further part in the season, and missed games at the start of 2011 with knee and ankle problems. In an effort to return to full fitness, Payten underwent experimental stem-cell therapy, saying, "At the moment I'm retiring unless this works dramatically.".

In Round 3 of the 2011 NRL season, he played his 250th NRL game in a 34–24 win over his former club, the Canberra Raiders.

In June 2011, prior to the Tigers' Round 13 game against the Newcastle Knights, Payten announced that he would retire at the end of the season. Payten said, "This isn't the way I wanted it to finish. If I'm really honest with myself, I'd be hard-pressed to continue on the way it's going at the moment. I can't." Already a Level 2 certified coach, Payten said he intended to pursue coaching. He returned from injury to make six more appearances off the bench towards the end of the season, but was unable to participate in the finals due to another injury.

== Coaching career ==
=== Wests Tigers ===
Shortly after his retirement in 2011, Payten was announced as the head coach of the Wests Tigers NYC team for 2012. In his first season as coach, the Tigers finished 4th in the regular season. They went on to win all their post-season games, including beating pre-game favourite Canberra Raiders 46–6 in the grand final. He coached the side again 2013, before moving into an assistant coaches role with the Tigers' NRL side in 2014.

In 2013, Payten made his representative coaching debut, as his New South Wales Under-18 team defeated Queensland 56–6. He coached the side again in 2014, with New South Wales winning 24–10.

=== North Queensland Cowboys ===
In October 2014, Payten joined the North Queensland Cowboys as their NYC head coach for the 2015 season and assistant to head coach Paul Green's NRL side. On 4 October 2015, Payten was a member of the Cowboys' coaching staff in the side's 17-16 Grand Final victory over the Brisbane Broncos. He remained on the North Queensland coaching staff until 2018, including their run to the 2017 Grand Final.

=== New Zealand Warriors ===
On 8 August 2018, Payten signed with the New Zealand Warriors as an assistant coach for the 2019 season, replacing his former Raiders' teammate Andrew McFadden.

On 20 June 2020, Payten was appointed interim head coach of the New Zealand Warriors following the sacking of Stephen Kearney. He was later offered the role on a full-time basis, but declined.

On 4 September 2020, he was announced as the head coach of the North Queensland Cowboys on a three-year deal, starting in 2021. The Warriors finished the 2020 season in 10th place. Before Payten took over as interim head coach, the Warriors were 14th and had won just two of their first six games. Under Payten they won six of their last 14 games and finished four points outside the top 8.

=== Return to North Queensland ===
In the 2021 NRL season, Payten had a difficult campaign with the North Queensland side remaining cellar dwellers for most of the season – winning only seven games and finishing second last (15th).

In 2022, the club returned to the finals series after four seasons, finishing the regular season in third and equalling a club record of 17 regular season wins. They ultimately fell just one game short of the Grand Final, with Payten later named the Dally M Coach of the Year. On 24 February 2023, Payten signed a three-year contract extension to remain as North Queensland head coach until the end of 2026. In the 2024 NRL season, Payten guided North Queensland back to the finals with a 5th-placed finish. They would be eliminated in the semi-finals by Cronulla. In the 2025 NRL season, North Queensland endured a difficult campaign where they finished 12th on the table. There was calls by some sections of the media and by fans that Payten should be relieved of his coaching duties due to North Queensland's poor performances throughout the year.

On 20 June 2026, the North Queensland outfit announced that Payten had re-signed for a further two years. In round 22 of the 2026 NRL season, under Payten the Sydney Roosters defeated North Queensland 82-12 which was the first time any first grade side had posted 80 points in a match since Eastern Suburbs achieved this feat in 1935 against Canterbury. It was also the biggest loss in North Queensland's 31-year history. Payten would eventually guide North Queensland to the finals with an 8th placed finish. They were knocked out in the first week of the finals by Cronulla.

== Statistics ==
=== ARL/Super League/NRL ===
†	Denotes seasons in which Payten won an NRL Premiership

Season	Team	Matches	T	G	GK %	F/G	Pts
1996	Canberra	2	0	0	–	0	0
1997	Canberra	11	1	0	–	0	4
1998	Canberra	7	1	0	–	0	4
1999	Canberra	16	1	0	–	0	4
2000	Canberra	19	3	0	–	0	12
2001	Canberra	17	1	0	–	0	4
2002	Canberra	18	2	0	–	0	8
2003	Sydney Roosters	18	1	0	–	0	4
2004	Wests Tigers	17	1	0	–	0	4
2005†	Wests Tigers	20	2	0	–	0	8
2006	Wests Tigers	24	2	0	–	0	8
2007	Wests Tigers	22	2	0	–	0	8
2008	Wests Tigers	11	0	0	–	0	0
2009	Wests Tigers	24	2	0	–	0	8
2010	Wests Tigers	21	0	0	–	0	0
2011	Wests Tigers	12	0	0	–	0	0
Career totals		259	19	0	–	0	76
