= 2005 NRL Grand Final =

Deciding game of Australian rugby league competition

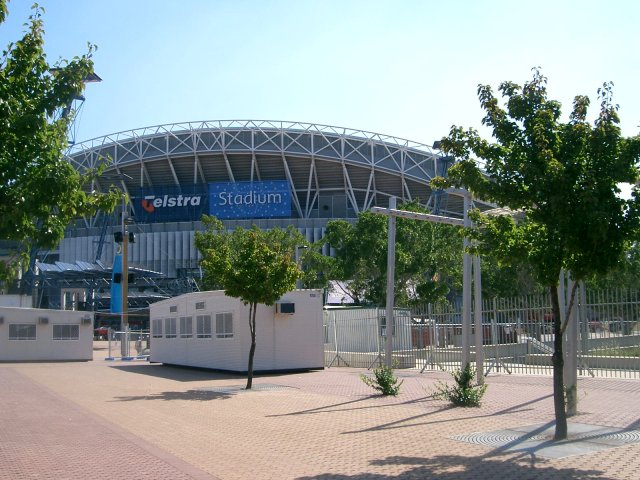
- Telstra Stadium, where the match was played

Wests Tigers	North Queensland Cowboys
30	16
	1	2	Total
WST	12	18	30
NQL	6	10	16
- Date: 2 October 2005
- Stadium: Telstra Stadium
- Location: Sydney, Australia
- Clive Churchill Medal: Scott Prince (WST)
- National anthem: Natalie Bassingthwaighte
- Referee: Tim Mander
- Attendance: 82,453

Broadcast partners
- Broadcasters: Nine Network
- Commentators: Ray Warren; Peter Sterling; Paul Vautin; Andrew Voss (sideline); Ben Ikin & Matthew Johns (sideline)

The 2005 NRL Grand Final was the conclusive and premiership-deciding game of the National Rugby League's 2005 Telstra Premiership season. It was played on the night of Sunday, 2 October at Sydney's Telstra Stadium between the Wests Tigers and North Queensland Cowboys, with both clubs making their grand final debuts. The Wests Tigers won the match 30–16 to claim their first premiership title, becoming the first joint-venture club to win a premiership. Scott Prince of the Wests Tigers received the Clive Churchill Medal as the official man of the match. The game set a new record for the highest television audience in Australia for a rugby league match since the introduction of the OzTam ratings system in 2001.

== Background ==
The 2005 NRL season was the 98th season of professional rugby league football in Australia and the eighth run by the National Rugby League. The lineup of clubs remained unchanged from the previous year, with fifteen teams contesting the 2005 Telstra Premiership. The fourth-placed Wests Tigers and fifth-placed North Queensland Cowboys had both reached their first premiership decider. The two teams had met three times during the season, with North Queensland winning by 44–20 in round six, though the Wests Tigers went in having won the previous two, including a 50–6 victory in the first week of the finals series.

=== Wests Tigers ===
The Wests Tigers played in their first grand final in their sixth season. Only centre Paul Whatuira and full-back Brett Hodgson had previously played in a grand final. Whatuira won with Penrith in 2003, while Hodgson had lost with Parramatta in 2001. The Wests Tigers had no State of Origin representative players in their team. However, their fullback, Brett Hodgson was the 2005 regular season's top point-scorer with 250 points. He would have a remarkable finals series scoring 58 points, and finished the 2005 season with 308 points in 28 matches.

The Wests Tigers went into the game as favourites to win, after comprehensively defeating the North Queensland Cowboys in week one of the finals, 50–6, then defeating the Brisbane Broncos 34–6 in week two of the finals, and then upsetting the St. George Illawarra Dragons in the preliminary final 20–12.

=== North Queensland Cowboys ===
For the North Queensland Cowboys, their grand final debut had come at the end of their eleventh season. North Queensland five-eighth Johnathan Thurston, the 2005 season's Dally M Medallist, had won the previous year's grand final with Canterbury as a utility player and replacement player for their injured captain Steve Price. Also, winger Matt Sing lost in 2000 with the Sydney Roosters. Their fullback Matt Bowen was the 2005 regular season's top try scorer. However their Queensland State of Origin forward Carl Webb was suspended for punching Melbourne Storm's Ryan Hoffman in the final round of the regular season, so he was forced to watch the entire Cowboys' finals run from the sidelines. Airline Qantas added an extra two flights and the Townsville Bulletin newspaper chartered a Boeing 747 to take North Queensland fans to their team's first grand final.

== Teams ==
Wests Tigers winger Pat Richards was in doubt for the match with a fractured ankle that eventually required six pain-killing injections for him to take place in the team, defying medical opinion.

Team details
Wests Tigers		Position	North Queensland Cowboys
Name	Number	Position	Number	Name
Brett Hodgson	1	Fullback	1	Matt Bowen
Daniel Fitzhenry	2	Wing	2	Ty Williams
Shane Elford	3	Centre	3	Josh Hannay
Paul Whatuira	4	Centre	4	Paul Bowman
Pat Richards	5	Wing	5	Matt Sing
Benji Marshall	6	Five eighth	16	Justin Smith
Scott Prince (c)	7	Half back	6	Johnathan Thurston
Anthony Laffranchi	8	Prop forward	8	Paul Rauhihi
Robbie Farah	9	Hooker	9	Aaron Payne
John Skandalis	10	Prop forward	10	Shane Tronc
Ben Galea	11	Second row	11	Steve Southern
Mark O'Neill	12	Second row	12	Luke O'Donnell
Dene Halatau	13	Lock forward	13	Travis Norton (c)
Liam Fulton	14	Interchange	7	Brett Firman
Chris Heighington	15	Interchange	14	Rod Jensen
Bryce Gibbs	16	Interchange	15	David Faiumu
Todd Payten	17	Interchange	17	Mitchell Sargent
Tim Sheens		Coach		Graham Murray
RLP

== Match details ==
The grand final was played at Sydney's Telstra Stadium before a crowd of 82,453. Television coverage of the match was provided by Nine's Wide World of Sports with commentary from Ray Warren, Peter Sterling, Paul Vautin, Phil Gould, Matthew Johns, Andrew Voss and Ben Ikin. The Veronicas and Pete Murray provided pre-match performances. A minute's silence was then held for the previous day's 2005 Bali bombings before Natalie Bassingthwaighte sung the Australian national anthem.

=== First half ===
At 19:00 AEST, Tim Mander, officiating his second grand final, blew time on and the Wests Tigers kicked off. In the eighth minute, North Queensland had almost reached the Tigers' 20-metre line on the third tackle of the set when Aaron Payne ran from dummy half and passed inside for Paul Rauhihi to hit the ball up and stand in the tackle, offloading to Johnathan Thurston who passed to Matt Bowen. Bowen then threw a deft pass back on the inside to Justin Smith who charged toward the line and threw the ball blindly back over his head before being tackled. The loose ball was picked up by Thurtson and handed to Bowen to dash the remaining few metres to the line and touch down behind the uprights. For the third week in a row, Bowen was the first try scorer of the game. Josh Hannay converted the try so North Queensland were leading 6–0. Ten minutes later the Wests Tigers were down at the opposition's end of the field where halfback Scott Prince on the last tackle put up a kick that came down over the try line and was taken by Paul Bowman who was about to be tackled in goal and threw a speculative pass which was not caught by his teammate. Wests Tigers forward Bryce Gibbs was there to fall onto the loose ball near the goal posts. Brett Hodgson kicked the extra two points so the scores were even at 6-6. North Queensland winger Ty Williams crossed the Wests Tigers try-line in the 23rd minute, but the video referee ruled no try due to an obstruction in back play. A few minutes later, Tigers' left winger Pat Richards crossed in the corner but the video referee disallowed the try as the ball was not properly grounded.

In the 35th minute the Wests Tigers received a Johnathan Thurston kick on their own try line, the ball going to Benji Marshall who ran with it, splitting the defence and charging down the left side and over the half-way line. Drawing a defender, Marshall then threw a flick pass behind his back to his winger Pat Richards coming through in support. Richards palmed off a North Queensland defender as he ran the remaining 20 metres to dive over and score, finishing one of the most famous grand final plays in history. Hodgson kicked the extra two points so now the Wests Tigers were leading 12–6. Shortly before half time the North Queensland side were penalised on their 20-metre line and Hodgson took the kick at goal but missed.

Australian electronic rock band Rogue Traders performed during the half time break.

=== Second half ===
In the fifth minute after the break, Wests were mounting an attack 10 metres from the North Queensland line when on the third tackle, hooker Robbie Farah put his prop forward Anthony Laffranchi through a gap to crash over the line and score near the uprights.

Brett Hodgson kicked the extra two points so the Tigers were leading 18–6. Ten minutes later North Queensland were attacking the Wests try line when Thurston, 10 metres out flicked the ball back to Travis Norton who charged over to score.

Josh Hannay converted the try so North Queensland were behind 18–12. In the 63rd minute the Tigers had the ball down near North Queensland's try-line and moved it out to Daniel Fitzhenry on the right wing to dive over in the corner. Hodgson kicked the goal from near the sideline to convert the try, taking the Tigers' lead out to 24–12.

With just over six minutes remaining, Wests Tigers half-back Scott Prince attempted a field goal but missed. Shortly after that North Queensland winger Matt Sing almost scored a try but the video referee found that he'd knocked on. A few minutes later though, the North Queensland side were down close to the Wests Tigers try line where their half-back Johnathan Thurston threw a cut out pass to Matt Sing to score on the right wing.

Josh Hannay missed the conversion so the score was 24–16 in favour of the Wests Tigers with under two minutes left to play. Seconds before the final siren the Wests Tigers got one more try when Hodgson, from ten metres out, put a grubber kick into North Queensland's in-goal area for Todd Payten to dive onto. Hodgson then converted the try so the final score was 30–16, and the Wests Tigers had their first premiership as a merged team.

For fans of Balmain Tigers and Western Suburbs Magpies, the premiership victory also ended long droughts for both sets of fans who came together to support the merged club. Balmain had not won the premiership since 1969 and Western Suburbs had not won since 1952. Wests Tigers captain Scott Prince, himself from North Queensland, was awarded the Clive Churchill Medal as man-of-the-match before being presented with the premiership trophy by Australian Prime Minister John Howard. It was the final match with the Tigers for their winger Pat Richards who joined English Super League club Wigan Warriors for the 2006 season.

The match had the highest television ratings for a night time grand final in history. As winners of the grand final the Wests club received $400,000 in prize money.

== Match summary ==
2005 NRL Grand Final

Sunday, 2 October
19:00 AEST (UTC+10)

Wests Tigers	30 – 16	North Queensland Cowboys
Tries: 5 Gibbs 18'; Richards 35'; Laffranchi 45'; Fitzhenry 63'; Payten 80'; Goals: 5 Hodgson 19', 37', 47', 64', 80' (5/6); Field goals: Prince (0/1)	1st: 12–6; 2nd: 18–10; Report	Tries: 3 Bowen 8'; Norton 55'; Sing 78'; Goals: 2 Hannay 10', 56' (2/3)

Telstra Stadium, Sydney
Attendance: 82,453
Referee: Tim Mander
Touch judges: Steve Carrall, Matt Cecchin
Clive Churchill Medal: Scott Prince (Wests Tigers)

== 2006 World Club Challenge ==
Having won the NRL grand final, Wests had earned the right to play against 2005's Super League X Champions, the Bradford Bulls in the following February's World Club Challenge.
