= Bryce Gibbs (rugby league) =

Australian rugby league footballer (born 1984)

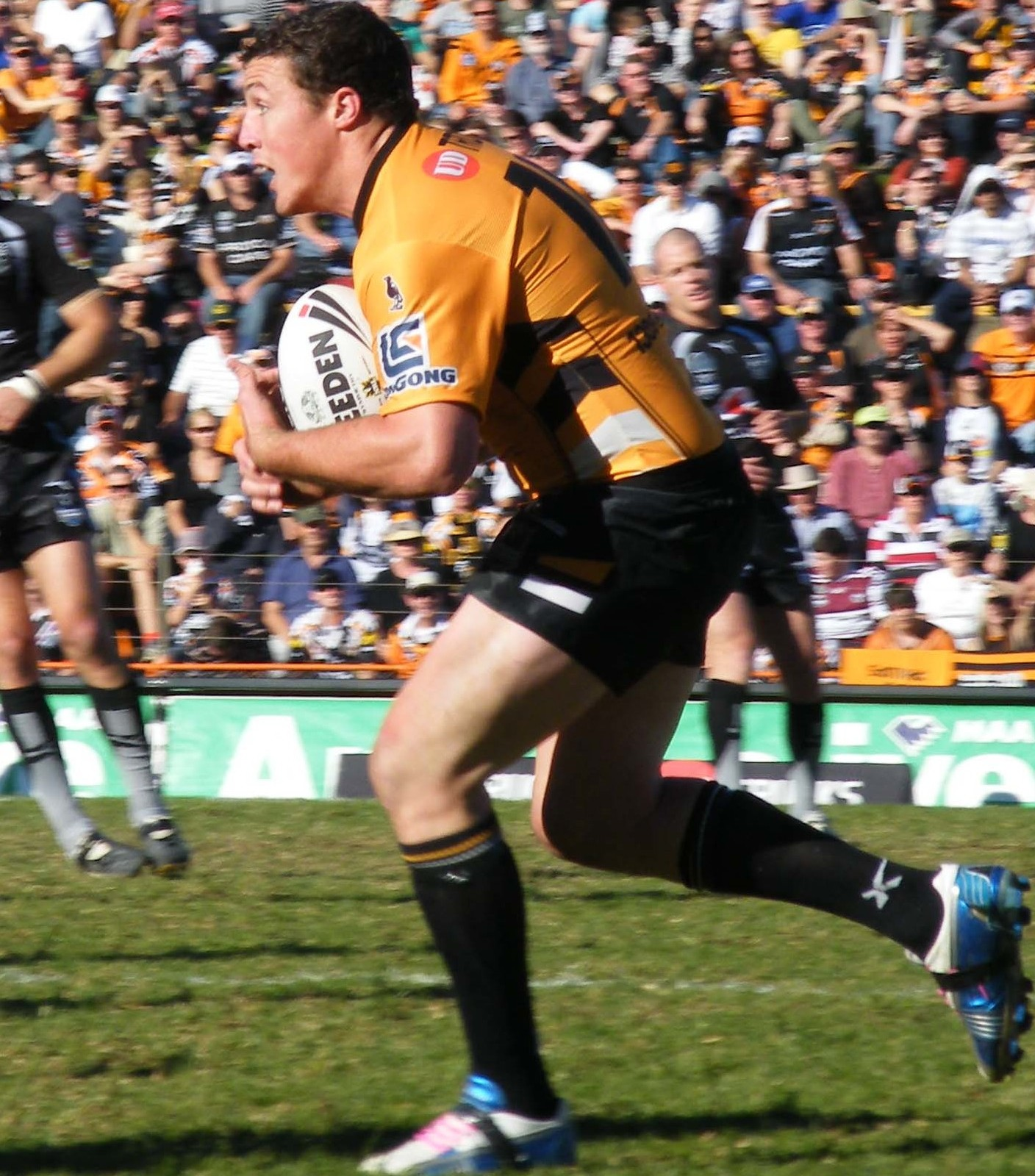

Personal information
- Full name: Bryce Kenneth Gibbs
- Born: 5 November 1984 (age 42) Camden, New South Wales, Australia

Playing information
- Height: 188 cm (6 ft 2 in)
- Weight: 108 kg (17 st 0 lb)
- Position: Prop
Club
Years	Team	Pld	T	G	FG	P
2003–11	Wests Tigers	155	3	0	0	12
2012–14	Cronulla Sharks	42	1	0	0	4
	Total	197	4	0	0	16
Representative
Years	Team	Pld	T	G	FG	P
2007–12	City Origin	4	0	0	0	0

Bryce Gibbs (born 5 November 1984 in Camden, New South Wales) is an Australian former professional rugby league footballer He played for the Wests Tigers with whom he won the 2005 NRL Premiership, and for the Cronulla-Sutherland Sharks of the National Rugby League (NRL). He has been called, "a passionate clubman, popular among teammates and a front-rower with good line-speed and a willingness to get his hands dirty."

== Background ==
Born in Camden, New South Wales, Gibbs played junior football with the Leumeah Wolves and Macquarie Fields Hawks before being signed by the Wests Tigers.

== Playing career ==
=== Wests Tigers ===
Gibbs made his NRL debut against Penrith in August 2003, scoring a try with his first touch of the ball. "I came off the bench for the Tigers against Penrith at Penrith. I got the ball and scored and thought 'how good’s this'," Gibbs later said.

In 2004 Gibbs was suspended for five matches following an incident in which he made contact with Brisbane Broncos five-eighth Casey McGuire.

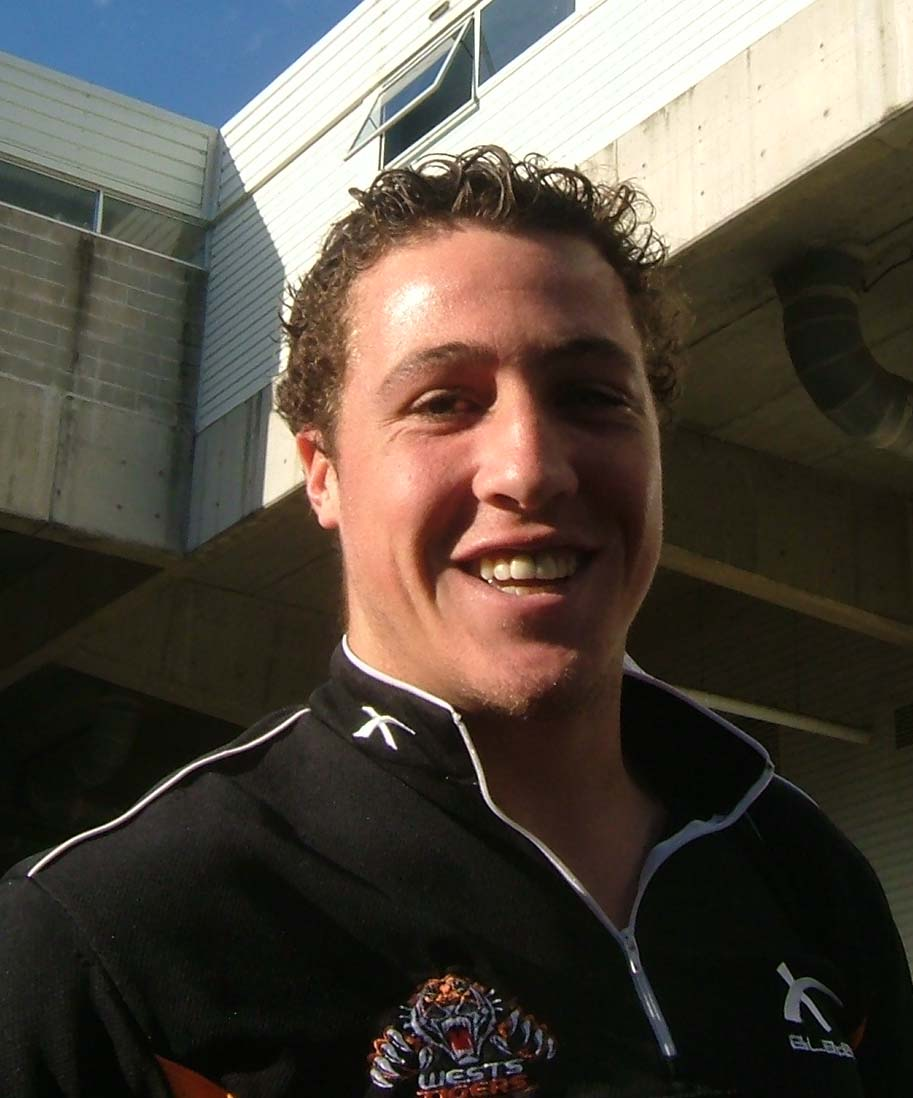
Gibbs in 2005

Gibbs scored a try in the Wests Tigers' victory in the 2005 NRL Grand Final, but never scored another for the club. As NRL Premiers Wests faced Super League champions Bradford Bulls in the 2006 World Club Challenge. Gibbs played from the interchange bench in the Tigers' 30–10 loss.

In 2008, Gibbs won the award for being the Wests Tigers' Best Defensive Player.

"He knows the game unbelievably well. He's a real footballer, and if he was a bit smaller and faster, he would have been a halfback or five-eighth because he knows the game so well."

— −Brad Fittler

A fractured kneecap saw Gibbs playing injured throughout the semis in 2010. He was unable to play in the early rounds of the next season. Around the same time, he signed a contract to remain with the Wests Tigers until the end of the 2014 season. However, by the middle of 2011, Wests Tigers had released Gibbs in order to make room for Adam Blair, and he signed a three-year contract with the Cronulla Sharks from the start of 2012.

Gibbs later said of his release, "I found out they didn't want me when I picked up the paper. The paper report said the club was punting me, Liam Fulton and Chris Heighington, but I didn't know what was going on. I can remember walking into the weights room and all the boys started laughing and saying, 'You are gone.' It wasn't a joke though because it was true. It was pretty embarrassing and devastating."

By the time Gibbs left the Wests Tigers, he had been a regular in the starting team for a number of years, and was one of the club's most experienced players, having played in 155 games. He was noted for his, "determination in defence." Former teammate Keith Galloway said of him, "I learnt so much from Bryce in terms of coming off the line in defence. He used to always shout at you if you were not pulling your weight".

=== Cronulla-Sutherland Sharks ===
"He's one of the great characters of the modern game, which is a bit of a lost art these days."

— −Peter Sharp

With new club Cronulla having a good start to 2012, and old club Wests Tigers a poor one, Gibbs was described by Ben Ross as, "the glue to any team he’ll be in. He gets the boys together and we have a lot of fun around him and he makes us more of a team than people would really see." After missing some early games due to injury, Gibbs was chosen to play for City Origin.

Midway through 2012, having yet to score since the 2005 Grand Final, Gibbs declared he would not cut his hair until he had another try. He said, "my kids have actually never even seen me score. I’ve got a couple at training but that’s about it. I’ll get one this year. I’m not going to get my hair cut until I do."

Gibbs did not appear for the Sharks until round 17 of 2013 season due to an injury when he put his foot through a glass door, resulting in 30 stitches and damage to his Achilles tendon.

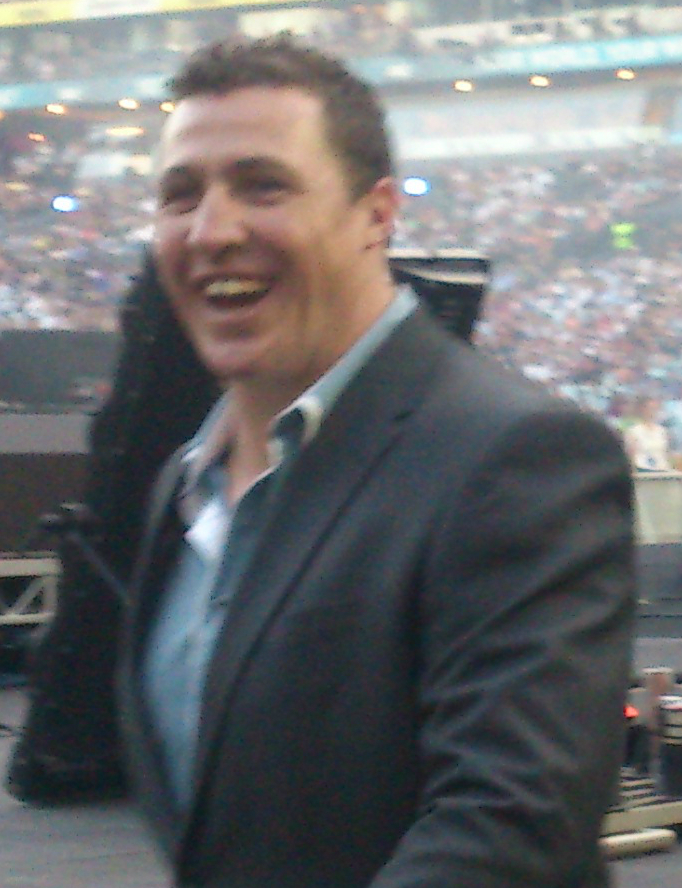
Gibbs at the 2015 NRL Grand Final

He said, "I was going to try and stitch it myself. The missus was filthy, there was blood everywhere. It looked like a murder scene. I tried to sleep it off but it was a bit painful and throbbing."

As of the start of the 2013 season, Gibbs had played 134 games without scoring a try, the most of any player who had scored at least one try in his first grade career. In Round 26 against the Canberra Raiders at Canberra Stadium in the Sharks 38–18 win, Gibbs scored a try, 142 matches since his last.

On 13 November 2014 Gibbs announced his retirement from rugby league after 12 years and just under 200 NRL games.

=== Highlights ===
- First Grade Debut: 2003 – Round 24, Wests Tigers v Penrith Panthers, Penrith Stadium, Sydney, 23 August
- Premierships: 2005 – Wests Tigers defeated North Queensland Cowboys 30 - 16 in the Grand Final, Stadium Australia, Sydney, 2 October.
- NSW City Origin Debut: 2007 – NSW City Origin v NSW Country Origin, Coffs Coast International Stadium, Coffs Harbour, New South Wales, 3 May.
- NSW City Origin Selection: 2007–2008, 2010, 2012
