= Murray Hurst =

Australian RL coach

Personal information
- Born: Australia

Coaching information
Club
| Years | Team | Gms | W | D | L | W% |
| 2001–02 | North Qld Cowboys | 36 | 9 | 2 | 25 | 25 |
Representative
| Years | Team | Gms | W | D | L | W% |
| 1998–00 | Tonga | 8 | 6 | 0 | 2 | 75 |

Murray Hurst is an Australian former rugby league coach. He was Head coach of the North Queensland Cowboys between 2001 and 2002 and coached Tonga in the World Cup of 2000.

== Early life ==
Hurst was born in Surat on a sheep and cattle property in the south west corner of Queensland. He attended Marist Brothers College at Ashgrove in Brisbane. Hurst has previously expressed his connection with the land, noting that he never contemplated another career other than to succeed his father on the family property.

== Coaching career ==
Hurst took over the job from as coach of the North Queensland Cowboys from Tim Sheens in 2001. Hurst was later replaced by former Sydney Roosters coach Graham Murray. Hurst finished his 25-year Coaching Career with an overall success rate of 88% from Club League in Queensland, Representative Coaching (Tonga, Aust U19, Qld Residents, Qld Country, Australian Universities) and NRL.

== Political career ==
After serving 4 years as an elected Councillor in Local Government, Hurst was unsuccessful as the LNP candidate for the seat of Townsville in the 2009 Queensland Election.
