= Graham Murray =

Australian rugby league player and coach (1955–2013)

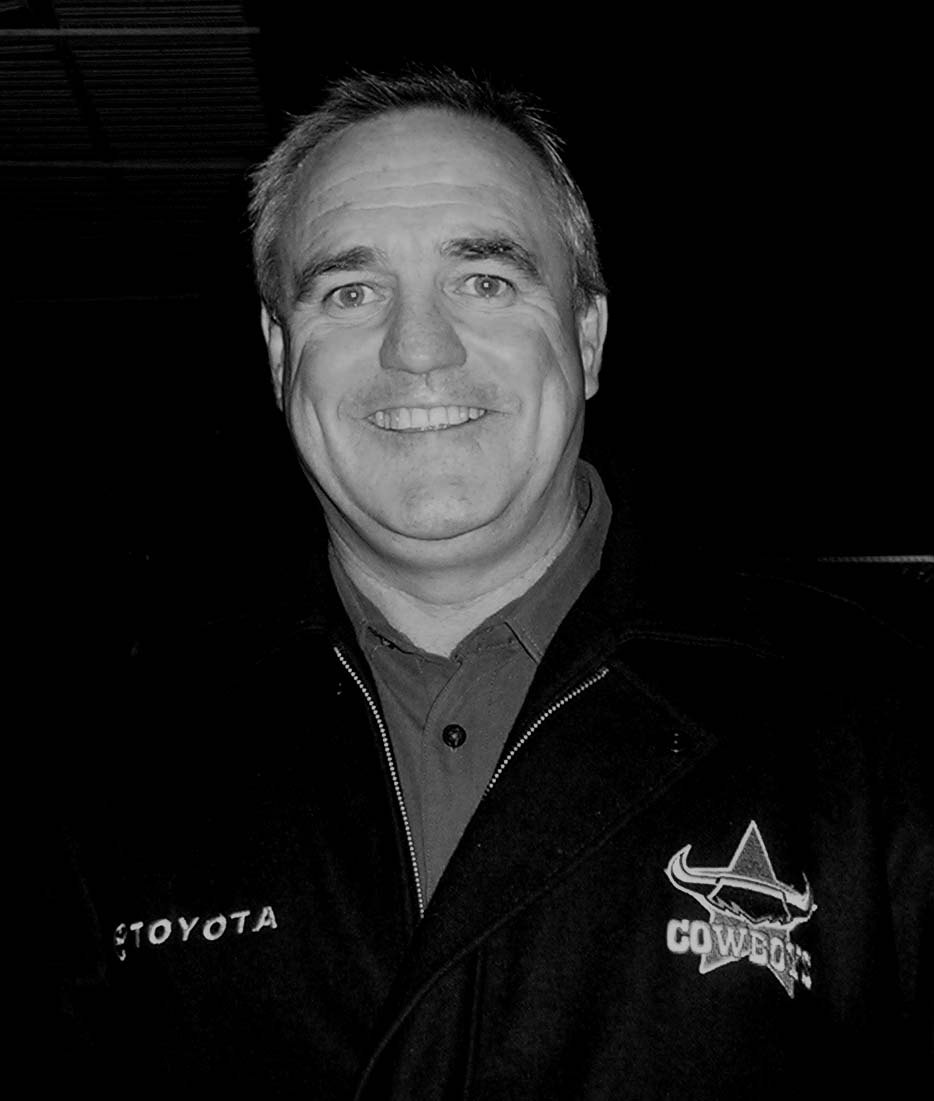
- Murray in 2008

Personal information
- Full name: Graham Ernest Murray
- Born: 6 January 1955 Peak Hill, New South Wales, Australia
- Died: 28 July 2013 (aged 58) Woolloongabba, Queensland, Australia

Playing information
- Height: 171 cm (5 ft 7 in)
- Weight: 75 kg (11 st 11 lb)
- Position: Halfback
Club
| Years | Team | Pld | T | G | FG | P |
|---|---|---|---|---|---|---|
| 1976–80 | Parramatta Eels | 46 | 9 | 0 | 0 | 27 |
| 1981–83 | South Sydney | 43 | 7 | 0 | 0 | 21 |
| | Total | 89 | 16 | 0 | 0 | 48 |

Coaching information
Club
| Years | Team | Gms | W | D | L | W% |
| 1991–95 | Illawarra Steelers | 95 | 51 | 5 | 39 | 54 |
| 1997 | Hunter Mariners | 18 | 7 | 0 | 11 | 39 |
| 1998–99 | Leeds Rhinos | 65 | 48 | 1 | 16 | 74 |
| 2000–01 | Sydney Roosters | 57 | 31 | 1 | 25 | 54 |
| 2002–08 | North Qld Cowboys | 161 | 79 | 1 | 81 | 49 |
| | Total | 396 | 216 | 8 | 172 | 55 |
Representative
| Years | Team | Gms | W | D | L | W% |
| 1995 | Fiji | 3 | 1 | 0 | 2 | 33 |
| 2001–05 | City NSW | 5 | 3 | 0 | 2 | 60 |
| 2006–07 | New South Wales | 6 | 2 | 0 | 4 | 33 |
| 2010–12 | Australian Jillaroos |

Graham Ernest Murray (6 January 1955 – 28 July 2013) was an Australian professional rugby league footballer who played in the 1970s and 1980s, and coached in the 1990s, 2000s and 2010s.

A New South Wales State of Origin head coach, Murray coached extensively at the highest club level: coaching the Illawarra Steelers, the Hunter Mariners, the Leeds Rhinos, the Sydney Roosters and the North Queensland Cowboys between the years 1991 and 2008. He also coached the Fiji national rugby league team, the City New South Wales rugby league team and the Australian women's team. He was named Dally M Coach of the Year in 1992.

== Personal life ==
Murray was born in Peak Hill, New South Wales to James Murray and Shirley Gallagher. He was the youngest of five siblings.

He married Amanda Jurd on 15 December 1984. On their ninth wedding anniversary they had a daughter.

== Playing career ==
=== Parramatta ===
Having starred for the Parramatta third-grade side in the middle 1970s, Murray took over as captain of the Eels' reserve grade side in 1977. He was regarded as too skilful for reserve grade rugby league, owing to his great organisational ability, which had him known as "little Artie" after Arthur Beetson. With international halfback John Kolc suffering ankle ligament damage, Murray spent some time in first grade during 1977, but returned to captain the reserve grade side to a premiership when Kolc was fit. 1978 saw Murray take over from Kolc as first grade halfback for most of the year, but the emergence of soon-to-be champion Peter Sterling caused him to flirt between the grades in 1979 and 1980. In 1979 he captained the reserves to their third premiership in five years.

=== South Sydney ===
Murray moved to Souths in 1981 and played fairly regularly in first grade until he left at the end of 1983 to play in the country.

== Coaching career ==
Murray began his coaching career with appointments as reserve grade coach at Penrith, where he won a premiership in 1987 and helped develop many of the future 1991 first-grade premiership team, and Balmain.

=== Illawarra Steelers ===
Murray was made coach of the Illawarra Steelers for the 1991 Winfield Cup season. In 1992, he guided the club to its only ever trophy with a 4–2 win in a tryless final against the Brisbane Broncos in the pre-season Toohey's Cup. He then took Illawarra to its first finals appearance in that season's Winfield Cup competition. During his tenure, the Steelers won more games than they lost, after having been perennial cellar-dwellers for the first decade of the club's existence. Murray was dismissed as head coach in April 1995 after he facilitated negotiations between Steelers players and representatives of the rebel Super League organisation. He was the only person out of the hundreds of players, coaches and administrators involved with the Super League saga to lose his job as a direct consequence of the brewing war.

Murray was the coach of the Fiji team in the 1995 World Cup, winning one game and losing two.

=== Hunter Mariners ===
Installed as coach of Super League's Newcastle-based Hunter Mariners club for its one and only season in 1997, Murray was able to construct a competitive team despite the apathy of the local rugby league community who were mostly supportive of the Newcastle Knights, who would popularly go on to win that year's Australian Rugby League premiership with a last-minute try in the 1997 ARL Grand Final. Although they made the final of the World Club Challenge in their first season, the Mariners were shut down as a condition of the establishment of the National Rugby League in 1998.

=== Leeds Rhinos ===
Left without a team to coach in Australia, Murray joined the Leeds Rhinos in the Super League, directing the team to their 1998 Super League Grand Final loss to the Wigan Warriors and 1999 Challenge Cup victory over the London Broncos. Murray signed a deal to coach the North Sydney Bears for the 2000 NRL season. However, before he could take up this position, the club was excluded from the competition and forced to merge with the Manly-Warringah Sea Eagles to become the Northern Eagles, with this new joint venture to be led by Manly's 1999 coach Peter Sharp.

=== Sydney Roosters ===
After the resignation of Phil Gould as coach of the Sydney Roosters, Murray was quickly named as his replacement. In 2000, Murray proceeded to guide the Roosters to their first grand final since 1980, although they would lose this match 14–6 to minor premiers the Brisbane Broncos.

Murray was also the NSW City Origin coach from 2001 to 2005. Despite the grand final appearance in 2000 and a sixth-place finish in 2001, Murray was sacked by the Roosters two days after the end of his second season with the club.

=== North Queensland Cowboys ===
After starting 2002 in his former profession as a teacher of mathematics, he was made head coach of the North Queensland Cowboys to replace the sacked Murray Hurst in April. After three seasons of steady improvement, the Cowboys made the NRL finals for the first time in 2004 and finished one game short of the grand final. They improved on their efforts in the following season, reaching the 2005 NRL Grand Final, the Cowboys' first, which they lost to the Wests Tigers by 30 to 16.

Murray coached City to victory in the annual contest against Country Origin in 2002, 2003 and 2005.

In 2006, Murray was named coach of the Illawarra Steelers’ "Team of Steel", celebrating the club's 25th anniversary. Murray was appointed coach of the New South Wales rugby league team for the 2006 State of Origin series; despite winning the first game, the Blues lost the series to Queensland by two games to one. In 2006, the Cowboys missed the finals and finished in ninth position.

Murray was re-appointed as New South Wales coach in 2007, with the full support of the North Queensland Cowboys board. Once again, however, New South Wales lost the series by two games to one. In August 2007, Murray announced that he would step down as coach of New South Wales.

On 19 May 2008, Murray resigned as coach of the North Queensland Cowboys.

== Later career ==
In 2010, Murray was appointed as the head coach of the Australia women's national rugby league team, the Australian Jillaroos. The Jillaroos would go on to win the World Cup against New Zealand in 2013, with the team dedicating their win to Murray.

He was appointed the Newcastle Knights’ High Performance Unit Director of Coaching for the 2012 season.

On 30 November 2012, Murray was appointed head coach of the Wynnum Manly Seagulls. Murray stood down as the Seagulls coach due to ill health.

== Death ==
In March 2013, Murray was comatose for a week following a heart attack.

Murray had another heart attack in July 2013, and was subsequently hospitalised at the Princess Alexandra Hospital in Woolloongabba, Brisbane. On 28 July, he was taken off life support and died later that day, aged 58.

== Sources ==
- Gary Lester, ed. (1983). The Sun Book of Rugby League – 1983. Sydney, New South Wales: John Fairfax Marketing. p. 78. ISBN 0-909558-83-3.
