= North Queensland Cowboys =

Australian rugby league football club

Club information
- Full name: North Queensland Cowboys Rugby League Football Club
- Short name: NQL
- Colours: Navy; Grey; Gold
- Founded: 30 November 1992; 33 years ago
- Website: cowboys.com.au

Current details
- Ground: North Queensland Stadium (25,000)
- CEO: Micheal Luck
- Chairman: David Myles
- Coach: Todd Payten
- Captain: Reuben Cotter & Tom Dearden
- Competition: National Rugby League
- 2026 season: 8th
- Current season

Uniforms
Home colours	Away colours

Records
- Premierships: 1 (2015)
- Runners-up: 2 (2005, 2017)
- Minor premierships: 0
- Wooden spoons: 3 (1995, 1997 ^{(SL)}, 2000)
- Most capped: 300* – Jason Taumalolo
- Highest try scorer: 151 – Kyle Feldt
- Highest points scorer: 2,182 – Johnathan Thurston

The North Queensland Cowboys are an Australian professional rugby league football club based in Townsville, the largest city in North Queensland. They compete in Australia's premier rugby league competition, the National Rugby League (NRL).

Since their foundation in 1995, the club has appeared in three grand finals (2005, 2015 and 2017) winning in 2015, and has reached the finals twelve times. The team's management headquarters and home ground, North Queensland Stadium, currently known as Queensland Country Bank Stadium due to sponsorship rights, are located in the suburb of South Townsville. Their women's team, established in 2023, currently compete in the NRL Women's Premiership.

The Cowboys were admitted to the premiership for the 1995 ARL season. They played in the breakaway Super League competition in 1997 before continuing to compete in the re-unified NRL competition the following year. After running into financial trouble in 2001, the club was taken over by News Limited. In 2007, the team was sold by News Limited to the Cowboys Leagues Club.

In 2015, the Cowboys played in the first all-Queensland grand final, defeating the Brisbane Broncos 17–16 in golden point to win their first premiership, in what is regarded as the best Grand Final of the modern era.

== History ==
Chart of yearly table positions for North Queensland Cowboys in First Grade Rugby League

=== 1995–1996: ARL ===
With the success of the Broncos in 1988, speculation intensified as to if the NSWRL would admit a new team based in North Queensland. In 1993, the NSWRL announced that North Queensland would enter the competition in 1995, along with three other new sides. One of the major difficulties that faced the club in their early years was attracting followers from the more established Queensland-based Winfield Cup side, the Brisbane Broncos. This was exacerbated by an initial lack of onfield success and stability. In their first two seasons, the Cowboys had eight different captains and finished last in their inaugural season.

=== 1997: Super League ===
After much court action in 1995 and 1996, a ten team Super League competition was held in 1997. The Cowboys competed in this competition, and their squad was bolstered by a number of new signings including Ian Roberts and Steve Walters. However, they were unable to improve on the club's results in previous years, and for the second time in three seasons they were to finish the season in last place.

North Queensland's first game of the Super League season, a 24–16 win over new team the Adelaide Rams played on 1 March at Stockland Stadium in front of 17,738 fans was also the first ever game of the Super League's competition.

=== 1998–1999: National Rugby League ===
In 1998 the Super League and Australian Rugby League competitions merged to form the National Rugby League (NRL). The Cowboys began their first season in this competition strongly, and after six rounds they were in equal first place. Although they fell away later in the season, they were to record the largest come-back to date in an Australian first grade rugby league match, defeating the Penrith Panthers 36–28 after trailing 26–0 at half-time. 1998 also saw the Cowboys record their largest loss to date, being defeated 62–0 by the North Sydney Bears in the last round of the home and away season.

The Cowboys signed their eleventh captain in 1999, Noel Goldthorpe. Paul Bowman was also to serve in that role during the season. Although their on-field performances were not spectacular, continuing high attendance figures saw aggregate attendances exceed one million spectators. This season the Cowboys also provided their first State of Origin representative when Paul Green was selected as Queensland's halfback for game 2 of the 1999 State of Origin series.

=== 2000–2003: Improved results ===
In the years 2000 through to 2002 the Cowboys continued to struggle with off-field dramas and the struggles of coaches and poor on-field performances. After finishing last in 2000, season 2001 began slowly. Tim Sheens resigned on 25 May and was replaced by his then assistant Murray Hurst. 4 straight losses in the opening rounds of 2002 led to Hurst being replaced early in the 2002 season, by former Illawarra Steelers and Leeds Rhinos coach Graham Murray. Murray stamped his authority and coaching prowess on the club and the NQ Cowboys looked far more competitive towards the end of the 2002 season. The Cowboys spent much of the 2003 season in the top eight with much improved performances from a host of players, including local talents Matt Bowen and Josh Hannay. The 2003 season ended with the Cowboys four points adrift of a top eight play-off position.

=== 2004–2005: First time finalists and Grand Finalists ===
After a slow start to the season that saw them at 13th on the ladder with just one win and five losses, the Cowboys turned it around in the second half of the season to finish with 12 wins and 11 losses and 7th spot, giving the club their first ever top eight appearance.

They upset the 2nd place Canterbury away from home in the first week of the finals, 30–22, thanks largely to hat-trick hero Matt Sing. The following week the Cowboys defeated their state rivals the Brisbane Broncos at home, 10–0, in perhaps the club's most famous victory.

They ended up falling one game short of the grand final, losing to the Sydney Roosters, 19–16.

North Queensland would go one better in 2005, when they reached their first grand final in club history. With the help of new recruits Carl Webb and Johnathan Thurston, the side finished in 5th spot and with back-to-back finals appearances. They would ultimately lose the grand final to the Wests Tigers.

In his first year with the club, Johnathan Thurston won the Dally M Medal and made his State of Origin debut for Queensland.

=== 2006–2007: Further improvement ===
In 2006, the Cowboys started the year with a 6-game winning streak and looked destined for another finals appearance, before ending the season with just 5 wins from 19 games and finishing in 9th position.

The 2007 season saw the Cowboys 3rd finals appearance and their first top 4 finish. They faced the Canterbury-Bankstown Bulldogs in Townsville in week 1 of the finals, scraping home by 2 points. The following week, they defeated the New Zealand Warriors at home by 37 points. They fell one game short of the grand final again, this time losing to Manly, 28–6. 2007 saw retirement of club legend Paul Bowman, who took up a coaching role with the team in 2008.

Johnathan Thurston finished the year with his second Dally M Medal and Matt Bowen was named Dally M Fullback of the Year.

=== 2008–2010: Struggling seasons ===
Former Cowboys' lock Luke O'Donnell

At the start of the 2008 season, the club announced head coach Graham Murray's contract would not be renewed. After only winning three of the first ten games, Murray resigned from his job and the club promoted assistant coach Ian Millward to the head coaching role for the rest of the year. During his stint as head coach, the club could only win two more games. Throughout the season the team were decimated by injuries and suspensions as well as off-field issues. In the end, the Cowboys finished 15th on the ladder avoiding the wooden spoon by for and against.

2009 saw the appointment of Neil Henry as head coach, who had won the Dally M Coach of the Year with the Canberra Raiders the previous year. The club however experienced another disappointing season, finishing 12th with 11 wins and 13 losses. 2009 also saw Matthew Bowen score his 100th try, becoming the first North Queensland player to score 100 tries for the club and the debut of future Australian and New South Wales representative forward James Tamou.

The beginning out the 2010 season was marred with the speculation of whether Johnathan Thurston would renew his contract with the club. Thurston ended up re-signing for another three seasons, however it brought very little success. The club finished 15th and would have received the wooden spoon if not for the Melbourne Storm salary cap scandal. 2010 saw the emergence of Scott Bolton and seeing the test debut of Matthew Scott. Jason Taumalolo became the Cowboys youngest ever debutant, making his debut against the Canterbury-Bankstown Bulldogs in round 24 aged 17 years and 82 days.

=== 2011–2013: Return to the Finals ===
After missing the finals for the last 3 seasons the Cowboys underwent a major overhaul of personnel for the 2011 season. Club legend Ty Williams retired and they parted ways with club favourites Luke O'Donnell, Carl Webb and Steve Southern. Their biggest signing for the 2011 season was Queensland and Australian representative centre Brent Tate. They also made key recruits in the signings of former Melbourne Storm and Queensland State of Origin representative Dallas Johnson and premiership winner Glenn Hall from the English Super League, re-signing a former Cowboy in Gavin Cooper and picking up younger, experienced first graders such as Antonio Winterstein.

The Cowboys' new signings had a positive impact on the NRL team, with the Cowboys spending much of the year in the top four before a late slide dropped them to seventh position and giving them their first finals appearance since 2007. That year, they were the most watched NRL club on pay television, and their round four clash with the Parramatta Eels was the fourth most-watched sports event in Fox Sport's history.

2012 saw North Queensland return to the finals after finishing in 5th spot. They faced the Brisbane Broncos in the first week of the finals, winning 33–16, with halfback Michael Morgan scoring a hat trick. They lost the following week to Manly, in controversial circumstances. Club legend Aaron Payne retired at the end of the season, after ten years with the team.

North Queensland again made the finals in 2013, the first time the club had made the finals series three straight years, when they finished in 8th place. After a poor start to the season, the side went on a 6-game winning streak following the sacking of coach Neil Henry. They were eliminated in Week 1 of the finals, after a controversial loss to the Cronulla-Sutherland Sharks. Club legend Matthew Bowen played his last season in the NRL, announcing he would be taking up an offer with Super League side, the Wigan Warriors. Club stalwarts Ashley Graham and Dallas Johnson also announced their retirements.

On 1 October 2013, former North Queensland halfback Paul Green was announced as head coach for the 2014 and 2015 seasons, becoming the first former Cowboys player to coach the club.

=== 2014–2017: A new era and the club's first premiership ===
The Cowboys started their 2014 season by winning the inaugural NRL Auckland Nines tournament which was held at Eden Park in Auckland. After losing key signing Lachlan Coote early in the tournament to injury, the Cowboys went on to face the Brisbane Broncos in the final, defeating them 16–7 to claim the trophy and a prize money cheque of $370,000.

After a difficult start to the season and a string of injuries to key players including internationals, the North Queensland club made a late charge to the finals finishing in fifth place and cementing a spot in the finals where they defeated the Brisbane Broncos, 32–20. They then travelled to Sydney to face the 2013 premiers the Sydney Roosters in the second week of the finals where they were defeated 31–30.

In 2015, North Queensland experienced their best ever regular season. They had a club record 11 game winning streak and finished with a club record 17 wins. In September, Johnathan Thurston won a record fourth Dally M Medal at the Dally M Awards.

On 26 September 2015, North Queensland qualified for their second grand final defeating the Melbourne Storm, 32–12. In the Grand Final, they defeated the Brisbane Broncos, 17–16. Thurston, who won the Clive Churchill Medal, kicked the winning field goal in golden point to win North Queensland's their first ever premiership.

On 21 February 2016, the club won their first World Club Challenge and were crowned the world's best club, defeating the Leeds Rhinos 38–4 at Headingley Rugby Stadium in Leeds, England. The club could not defend its premiership, finishing the 2016 NRL season in 4th place and falling one game short of the Grand Final, being eliminated by the Cronulla Sharks 32–20 at Allianz Stadium.

In 2017, despite losing co-captains Johnathan Thurston and Matthew Scott to season-ending injuries, the club qualified for their third Grand Final. Although they were just the second side to reach the Grand Final from 8th place, they would lose to the Melbourne Storm, who finished the regular season as minor premiers.

=== 2018–2019: Departure of club legends ===
Before the 2018 season began, North Queensland were predicted by many to challenge for the premiership with the return of Matthew Scott and Johnathan Thurston from injury. Instead, they struggled to move away from the bottom of the ladder, going on two separate five-game losing streaks throughout the season. With two rounds to play, the club sat in last place. Two wins from their final two games saw them finish in 13th. The 2018 season would be the last for Thurston, who retired after 14 seasons, 294 games and one premiership for the club. In his final match, the Cowboys defeated the Titans 30–26.

Despite a poor 2018 and the loss of Thurston, many expected the Cowboys to return to the finals in 2019. What followed was another disappointing year in which the club finished 14th. Club legends Matthew Scott and Scott Bolton were farewelled at the end of the season. Both were members of the club's premiership winning side in 2015 and spent their entire NRL careers at the club. The club also played its final game at Willows Sports Complex, defeating the Canterbury-Bankstown Bulldogs 15–8.

=== 2020–2022: Rebuilding seasons and finals return ===
Following two poor seasons in which they missed the finals, North Queensland looked to rebuild ahead of the 2020 NRL season. Their marquee signing was Australian and Queensland representative Valentine Holmes, who had spent 2019 playing for the New York Jets in the NFL. Holmes, a Townsville junior, signed a six-year deal with the club.

On 20 July 2020, after just three wins from their first 10 games, Paul Green announced his resignation from the club, with assistant coach Josh Hannay named as the interim head coach. On 4 September 2020, Todd Payten, a former assistant coach at the club, was announced as North Queensland's head coach on a three-year deal, starting in 2021.

Under Payten, the Cowboys endured another disappointing season, finishing 15th with seven wins.

In 2022, the club returned to the finals series after four seasons, finishing the regular season in third and equalling a club record of 17 regular season wins. They ultimately fell just one game short of the Grand Final, with Todd Payten later named the Dally M Coach of the Year.

North Queensland started the 2023 NRL season poorly which saw the club only winning three of their opening ten games. In round 12, the club suffered one of their worst defeats losing 66–18 against the Wests Tigers. In round 18, North Queensland recorded the third biggest victory in Australian rugby league history defeating the Wests Tigers 74–0. It was also the largest victory of the NRL era. North Queensland would finish the 2023 NRL season in 11th place and miss the finals. In the final round of the season, the club had the chance to make the finals if they were able to beat Penrith but the North Queensland side came up short losing 44–12.

In the 2024 NRL season, North Queensland would finish 5th on the table and qualify for the finals. After defeating Newcastle in the elimination final, the clubs season would be ended the following week by Cronulla in the semi-final.

In the 2025 NRL season, North Queensland endured a difficult campaign finishing 12th on the table where they managed to record only nine wins all year.

In round 22 of the 2026 NRL season, North Queensland were defeated 82–12 by the Sydney Roosters which was the first time any first grade side had posted 80 points in a match since Eastern Suburbs achieved this feat in 1935 against Canterbury. It was also the biggest loss in North Queensland's history. The Cowboys would finish the season in 8th place on the table. The club were eliminated in the first week of the finals by Cronulla.

== Season summaries ==
P=Premiers, R=Runners-Up, M=Minor Premierships, F=Finals Appearance, W=Wooden Spoons (brackets represent finals games)
Competition	Games Played	Games Won	Games Drawn	Games Lost	Ladder Position	P	R	M	F	W	Coach	Captain(s)	Details
1995 ARL season	22	2	0	20	20 / 20					♦	Grant Bell	Laurie Spina	North Queensland Cowboys 1995
1996 ARL season	21	6	0	15	17 / 20						Graham Lowe	Adrian Vowles	North Queensland Cowboys 1996
1997 SL season	18	5	2	11	10 / 10					♦	Tim Sheens	Ian Roberts	North Queensland Cowboys 1997
1998 NRL season	24	9	0	15	16 / 20						Tim Sheens	John Lomax	North Queensland Cowboys 1998
1999 NRL season	24	4	1	19	16 / 17						Tim Sheens	Noel Goldthorpe	North Queensland Cowboys 1999
2000 NRL season	26	7	0	19	14 / 14					♦	Tim Sheens	Tim Brasher	North Queensland Cowboys 2000
2001 NRL season	26	6	2	18	13 / 14						Tim Sheens/Murray Hurst	Paul Bowman	North Queensland Cowboys 2001
2002 NRL season	24	8	0	16	11 / 15						Murray Hurst/Graham Murray	Paul Bowman	North Queensland Cowboys 2002
2003 NRL season	24	10	0	14	11 / 15						Graham Murray	Paul Bowman	North Queensland Cowboys 2003
2004 NRL season	24 (3)	12 (2)	1 (0)	11 (1)	7 / 15				♦		Graham Murray	Travis Norton	North Queensland Cowboys 2004
2005 NRL season	24 (4)	14 (2)	0 (0)	10 (2)	5 / 15		♦		♦		Graham Murray	Travis Norton	North Queensland Cowboys 2005
2006 NRL season	24	11	0	13	9 / 15						Graham Murray	Travis Norton	North Queensland Cowboys 2006
2007 NRL season	24 (3)	15 (2)	0 (0)	9 (1)	3 / 16				♦		Graham Murray	Johnathan Thurston	North Queensland Cowboys 2007
2008 NRL season	24	5	0	19	15 / 16						Graham Murray/Ian Millward	Johnathan Thurston	North Queensland Cowboys 2008
2009 NRL season	24	11	0	13	12 / 16						Neil Henry	Johnathan Thurston	North Queensland Cowboys 2009
2010 NRL season	24	5	0	19	15 / 16						Neil Henry	Johnathan Thurston	North Queensland Cowboys 2010
2011 NRL season	24 (1)	14 (0)	0 (0)	10 (1)	7 / 16				♦		Neil Henry	Johnathan Thurston; Matthew Scott	North Queensland Cowboys 2011
2012 NRL season	24 (2)	15 (1)	0 (0)	9 (1)	5 / 16				♦		Neil Henry	Johnathan Thurston; Matthew Scott	North Queensland Cowboys 2012
2013 NRL season	24 (1)	12 (0)	0 (0)	12 (1)	8 / 16				♦		Neil Henry	Johnathan Thurston; Matthew Scott	North Queensland Cowboys 2013
2014 NRL season	24 (2)	14 (1)	0 (0)	10 (1)	5 / 16				♦		Paul Green	Johnathan Thurston; Matthew Scott	North Queensland Cowboys 2014
2015 NRL season	24 (4)	17 (3)	0	7 (1)	3 / 16	♦			♦		Paul Green	Johnathan Thurston; Matthew Scott	North Queensland Cowboys 2015
2016 NRL season	24 (3)	15 (1)	0	9 (2)	4 / 16				♦		Paul Green	Johnathan Thurston; Matthew Scott	North Queensland Cowboys 2016
2017 NRL season	24 (4)	13 (3)	0	11 (1)	8 / 16		♦		♦		Paul Green	Johnathan Thurston; Matthew Scott	North Queensland Cowboys 2017
2018 NRL season	24	8	0	16	13 / 16						Paul Green	Johnathan Thurston; Matthew Scott	North Queensland Cowboys 2018
2019 NRL season	24	9	0	15	14 / 16						Paul Green	Michael Morgan	North Queensland Cowboys 2019
2020 NRL season	20	5	0	15	14 / 16						Paul Green/Josh Hannay	Michael Morgan	North Queensland Cowboys 2020
2021 NRL season	24	7	0	17	15 / 16						Todd Payten/Dean Young	Michael Morgan, Jason Taumalolo	North Queensland Cowboys 2021
2022 NRL season	24 (2)	17 (1)	0	7 (1)	3 / 16				♦		Todd Payten	Jason Taumalolo, Chad Townsend	North Queensland Cowboys 2022
2023 NRL season	24	12	0	12	11 / 17						Todd Payten	Jason Taumalolo, Chad Townsend	North Queensland Cowboys 2023
2024 NRL season	24 (2)	15 (1)	0	9 (1)	5 / 17				♦		Todd Payten	Reuben Cotter, Tom Dearden	North Queensland Cowboys 2024
2025 NRL season	24	9	1	13	12 / 17						Todd Payten	Tom Dearden, Scott Drinkwater	North Queensland Cowboys 2025
2026 NRL season	24 (1)	13	0	11	8 / 17				♦		Todd Payten	Reuben Cotter, Tom Dearden	North Queensland Cowboys 2026

== Head-to-head records ==
Opponent	Played	Won	Drawn	Lost	Win %
Titans	36	23	0	13	63.89
Dragons	41	24	0	17	58.54
Knights	48	25	0	23	52.08
Raiders	51	26	0	25	50.98
Tigers	49	24	0	25	48.98
Rabbitohs	42	20	1	21	47.62
Panthers	50	23	1	26	46.00
Eels	49	22	1	26	44.90
Warriors	49	22	0	27	44.90
Bulldogs	47	21	0	26	44.68
Sea Eagles	39	15	0	24	38.46
Dolphins	6	2	0	4	33.33
Sharks	61	20	0	41	32.79
Broncos	65	21	2	42	32.31
Roosters	46	14	0	32	30.34
Storm	48	14	0	34	29.17

== Players ==
=== 2027 NRL Squad ===
North Queensland Cowboys 2027 squad
Top 30 squad – 2027 NRL season			Development list	Coaching staff
Braidon Burns – WG; Joe Chan – SR; Tom Chester – CE; Jake Clifford – FE; Reuben Cotter (c) – LK; Tom Dearden (c) – HB; Robert Derby – WG; Coen Hess – PR; Sione Katoa – WG	Ethan King – FB, CE; Mason Kira – LK; Kaiden Lahrs – PR; Zac Laybutt – CE; Soni Luke – HK; Heilum Luki – SR; Reed Mahoney – HK; Thomas Mikaele – PR; Jeremiah Nanai – SR	Griffin Neame – PR; Ronald Philitoga – WG; Jaxon Purdue – FB, CE; Jesse Ramien – CE; Liam Sutton – FE, FE; Jason Taumalolo – PR, LK; James Walsh – CE	Jake Elliott – FE; Xavier Kerrisk – HK; Archie Mesritz – FB; Fanafou Seve – PR; Matthew Watts – PR; Leeroy Weatherall – PR; Extended squad: Braith Dowson – HK; Maddox Goodwin – LK; Taj Lateo – FE; Reweti Ngarimu – SR; Alekisio Siale – PR; Taylan To'a – SR; Tyson Walker – HB; Train and trial: Domenico De Stradis – SR; Mitch Fogarty – HK; Kieran Hayman – FE; Tom McNulty – SR; Eli Morris – FE; Creedence Toia – FB	Head coach: Todd Payten; Assistant coaches: Blake Green; Steve Sheppard; Jordan McLean; Mitchell Dunn; Brett O'Farrell; Legend: (c) Captain(s); (vc) Vice-captain(s); Supplementary list; Extended squad; Train and trial; Updated: 20 November 2026; Source(s): NQ Cowboys

=== Notable players ===
Since 1995, the Cowboys have supplied numerous players to state and international representative sides.

==== 10th anniversary team ====
In 2004, the Cowboys conducted a poll asking fans to vote on the best players to have worn Cowboy colours. After polling had finished the club released the overall best team to celebrate the team's 10th anniversary.

Cowboys 10th Anniversary Team
First team squad	Coaching staff
1 Matthew Bowen – FB; 2 Ty Williams – WG; 3 Josh Hannay – CE; 4 Paul Bowman – CE; 5 Matt Sing – WG; 6 Julian O'Neill – FE; 7 Laurie Spina – HB; 8 John Buttigieg – PR; 9 Steve Walters – HK; 10 Paul Rauhihi – PR; 11 Kevin Campion – SR; 12 Peter Jones – SR; 13 Glenn Morrison – LK	Head coach: Graham Murray; Legend: (c) Captain(s); (vc) Vice-captain(s)

==== 20th anniversary team ====
In 2015, the Cowboys celebrated their 20th anniversary and named a 20-year team at their anniversary dinner. The team was selected from a panel consisting of four former Cowboys coaches: Grant Bell, Neil Henry, Murray Hurst and Tim Sheens, and then-current coach Paul Green.

Cowboys 20th Anniversary Team
First team squad	Coaching staff
1 Matthew Bowen – FB; 2 Ty Williams – WG; 3 Brent Tate – CE; 4 Paul Bowman – CE; 5 Matt Sing – WG; 6 Johnathan Thurston – FE; 7 Nathan Fien – HB; 8 Matthew Scott – PR; 9 Aaron Payne – HK; 10 Paul Rauhihi – PR; 11 Luke O'Donnell – SR; 12 Gavin Cooper – SR; 13 Travis Norton – LK	Legend: (c) Captain(s); (vc) Vice-captain(s)

==== 25th anniversary team ====
In 2020, the Cowboys celebrated their 25th anniversary and announced a 25-year team at their anniversary dinner, voted on by fans of the club. A number of players selected five years earlier were again in the side, with Kyle Feldt, Michael Morgan and Jason Taumalolo the new additions. John Asiata was selected as the club's best utility player.

Cowboys 25th Anniversary Team
First team squad		Coaching staff
1 Matthew Bowen – FB; 2 Kyle Feldt – WG; 3 Brent Tate – CE; 4 Paul Bowman – CE; 5 Matt Sing – WG; 6 Michael Morgan – FE; 7 Johnathan Thurston – HB; 8 Matthew Scott – PR; 9 Aaron Payne – HK; 10 Paul Rauhihi – PR; 11 Luke O'Donnell – SR; 12 Gavin Cooper – SR; 13 Jason Taumalolo – LK	14 John Asiata – PR	Legend: (c) Captain(s); (vc) Vice-captain(s)

==== Cowboys Hall of Fame ====
In 2015, the Cowboys launched their official Hall of Fame during their 20th anniversary celebrations. The foundation criteria were that any players considered had to have played at least 100 NRL games for the club and that they had to have been retired for at least two years. The inductees were decided by a specially selected panel, including members of the Cowboys' organisation and the wider rugby league community, and are assessed on their skill and ability, leadership, integrity and character, their state and international honours, and awards won at the club.

In 2019, Matthew Bowen was inducted into the Hall of Fame at the club's 2019 season launch event.

Inductee	Class	Position	Seasons
Paul Bowman	2015	Centre	1995–2007
Matt Sing	2015	Wing	2002–2007
Matthew Bowen	2019	Fullback	2001–2013
Johnathan Thurston	2021	Halfback	2005–2018
Matthew Scott	2023	Prop	2004–2019

== Coaches ==
The Cowboys' current coach, Todd Payten took over as head coach of the side from 2021, becoming the club's tenth and incumbent coach.

No	Coach	Tenure	Matches	Won	Drawn	Lost	Win %
1	Grant Bell	1995	22	2	0	20	9.1%
2	Graham Lowe	1996	21	6	0	15	28.6%
3	Tim Sheens	1997–2001	109	32	4	73	29.4%
4	Murray Hurst	2001–2002	18	4	1	13	22.2%
5	Graham Murray	2002–2008	161	79	1	81	49.1%
6	Ian Millward	2008	14	2	0	12	14.3%
7	Neil Henry	2009–2013	124	58	0	66	46.8%
8	Paul Green	2014–2020	167	87	0	80	52.1%
9	Josh Hannay	2020	10	2	0	8	20%
10	Todd Payten	2021–	125	62	1	61	50%
11	Dean Young	2021	1	0	0	1	0%

== Honours ==
At the end of each season the North Queensland Cowboys hold their Presentation Ball, in which they present (among other awards) the Paul Bowman Medal for Cowboy of the Year. The player of the year award, which was named after Bowman in 2007, is awarded to Cowboys player voted as the best and fairest over the premiership season. After each match, the coaching staff award three votes to the best Cowboys player on ground, two votes to the second best, and one vote to the third best, similar to the Dally M Medal voting system.

The most recent Paul Bowman Medal winner is Jason Taumalolo, who won the award for the first time in 2016 and is the first player to win the award four consecutive times. Bowman himself is a two-time winner of the award (1999, 2000), as is Luke O'Donnell (2004, 2009), Aaron Payne (2006, 2008) and Matt Scott (2010, 2013), while Johnathan Thurston, was the first player to win the award four times (2005, 2012, 2014, 2015). The first recipient of the medal was Wayne Sing in 1995.

In 2014, the Cowboys won their first major trophy, the inaugural NRL Auckland Nines tournament which was held at Eden Park in Auckland, defeating the Brisbane Broncos 16–7 in the final. A year later the Cowboys won their first NRL premiership, defeating the Broncos 17–16 in golden point extra time. Johnathan Thurston was awarded the Clive Churchill Medal.

In 2020, the Cowboys won the NRL Nines for the second time, becoming the first club to do so. They defeated the St George Illawarra Dragons 23–14 in the final with Scott Drinkwater being named the Player of the Tournament.

== Statistics and records ==
After a 10-year finals drought, the Cowboys made their first finals appearance in 2004, finishing one game away from the grand final. The following year the team played in their first grand final, losing to the Wests Tigers. The North Queensland club's second appearance in the grand final would not come for another 10 years, when they met Queensland rivals, Brisbane Broncos, in the 2015 decider. In one of the most entertaining grand finals in living memory, Johnathan Thurston kicked a golden-point field goal to win the Cowboys their maiden premiership.

The club's Under 20s side finished runners-up in the 2011 NYC grand final to the New Zealand Warriors while their feeder teams have won the Queensland Cup four times. In 2005 with the North Queensland Young Guns, 2010 and 2014 with the Northern Pride and 2013 with the Mackay Cutters.

Fullback Matthew Bowen currently holds the record for most first grade games and most tries for club. Bowen also holds the club record for most tries in a season, with 22 in 2007. Paul Bowman became the first Cowboy to play 200 first grade games in 2007. Johnathan Thurston jointly holds the record for most points in a match with Josh Hannay at 24. Hannay's 10 goals against South Sydney in 2003. Johnathan Thurston currently holds the most points in a season in 2014 with 234 points. Winger Ray Mercy was the first, and so far only, Cowboy to score four tries in a match, which he did against Balmain in 1998.

The club's biggest winning margin is 74 points, achieved in 2023 in a 74 - 0 victory over the Wests Tigers. Their heaviest defeat is a 62–0 loss by the Parramatta Eels in 2001.

== Stadium ==
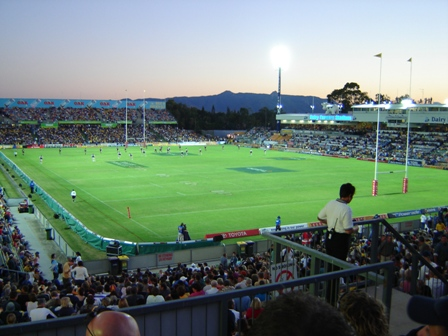
View of the Cowboys former home ground, Willows Sports Complex

From 1995 to 2019, the Cowboys played their home games at Willows Sports Complex, located in the Townsville suburb of Kirwan. Prior to 1995, the venue hosted trotting paceway nights, and was the main pacing venue for the Townsville District, but due to the admittance of the Cowboys, the venue was turned into a rugby league stadium.

The venue was renamed Stockland Stadium in 1995, due to sponsorship rights, and attracted a crowd of 23,156 to the Cowboys first ever premiership game. In 1998, the name was changed to Malanda Stadium by new sponsors Dairy Farmers, before being renamed again in 1999 to Dairy Farmers Stadium. The stadium underwent major renovations in 2005 and 2006, with the eastern, northern and southern grandstands receiving upgrades, the addition of more corporate boxes and a new replay screen and public address system installed. Dairy Farmers 15-year partnership with the Cowboys ended at the end of 2012 season, as the club looked for a new naming rights sponsor for the stadium.

In 2013, the stadium was renamed 1300SMILES Stadium, after the Townsville-based dental practice entered into a five-year sponsorship deal with Stadiums Queensland. On 29 August 2019, the club played their final game at the stadium, defeating the Canterbury Bulldogs 15–8.

The club record attendance for a regular season match is 30,302, set against the Brisbane Broncos in the round 8 of the 1999 season. The record attendance for a finals match is 24,989, set against the Brisbane Broncos in week 2 of the 2004 finals series.

In 2020, the club moved to the new 25,000-seat Queensland Country Bank Stadium in South Townsville.

== Training base ==
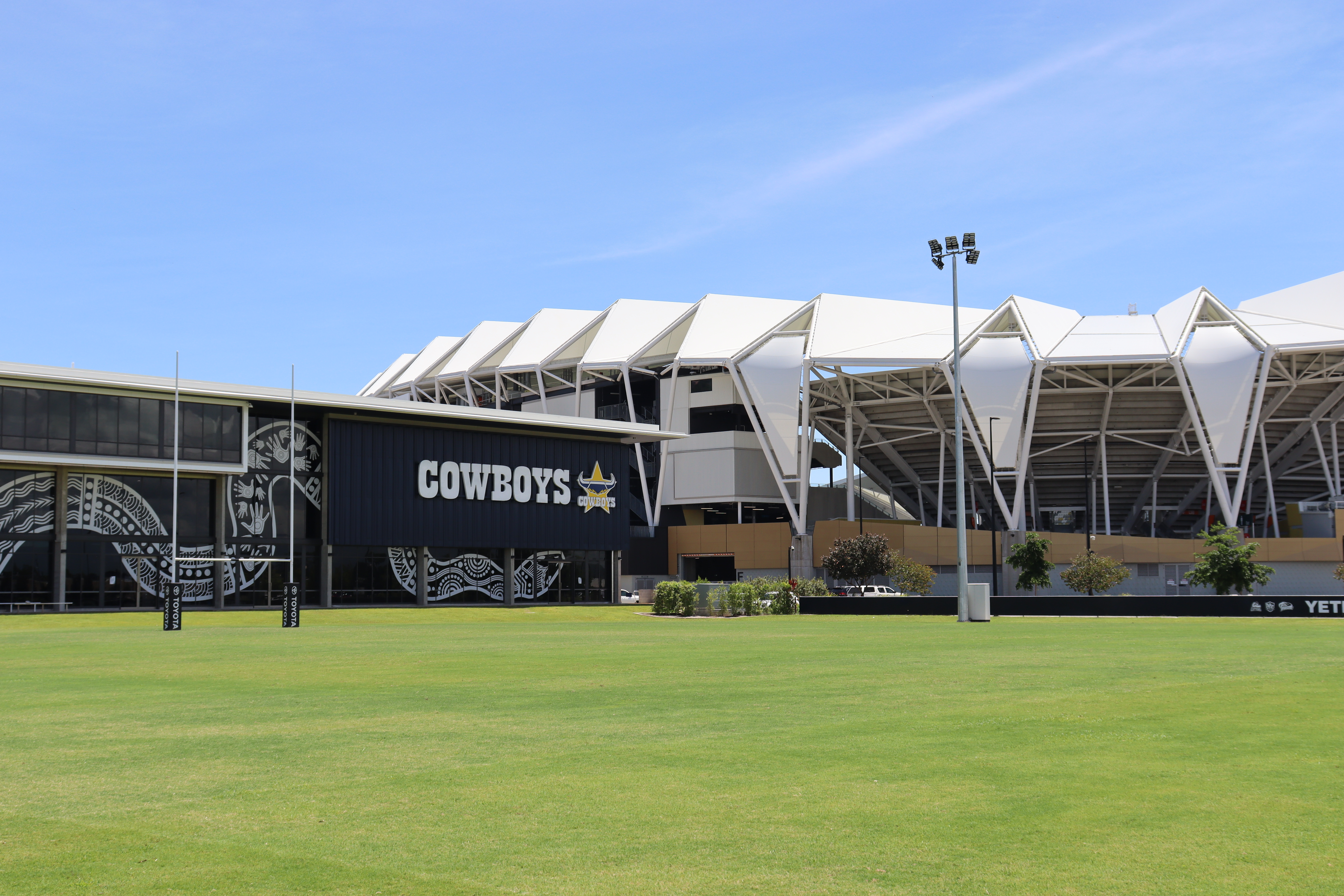
The facade of the Cowboys' training and administration base, with Queensland Country Bank Stadium in the background.

In 2021, the Cowboys opened a new training and administration base, known as the Hutchinson Builders Centre for sponsorship reasons, adjacent to Queensland Country Bank Stadium.

== Emblems and colours ==
Before becoming the Cowboys, the team names Marlins, Stingrays and the very popular Crocodiles were tossed up as potential team logos for the side, before public consultation resulted in the name 'Cowboys' (the Crocodiles name would eventually go to Townsville's National Basketball League team, who changed their name to the Townsville Crocodiles in 1998 after a dispute with the NBA's Phoenix Suns over their original name, the Townsville Suns). The colours navy blue and yellow were chosen to reflect the colours of the Townsville representative sides. Grey was also added as primary colour with white introduced as a secondary colour.

=== Logos ===
1995–1997

1998–2003

The club's "steer head" logo has stayed basically the same since 1995. In the early years the logo was on a white rectangular background, before being backed with a yellow oval. In 2003 the font was changed and a yellow star added, which remain to this day. A lighter shade of navy blue and white were also added to the logo. In 2020, the club introduced a new logo to celebrate their 25th season.

=== Primary Jerseys ===
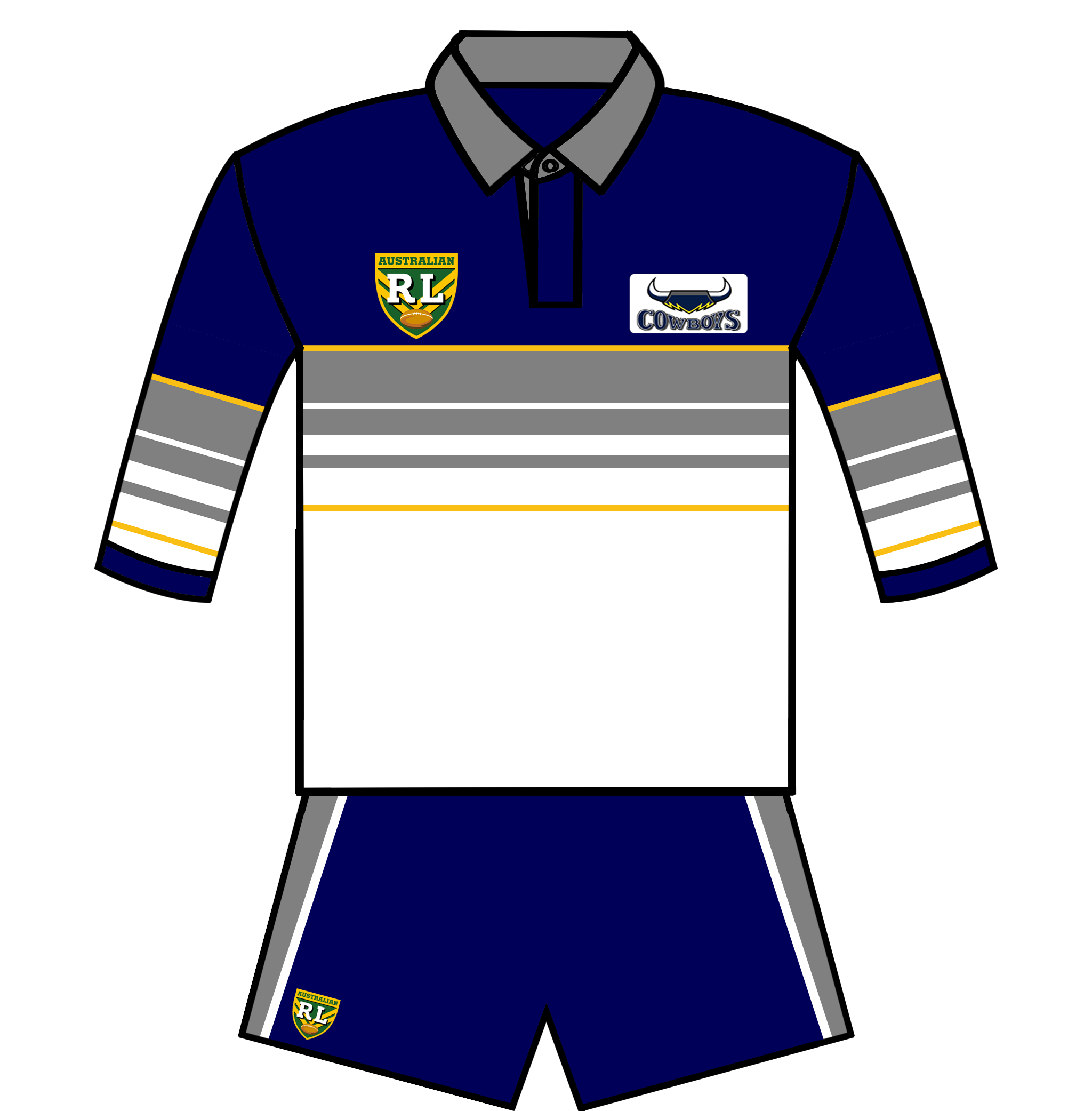
1995–1996

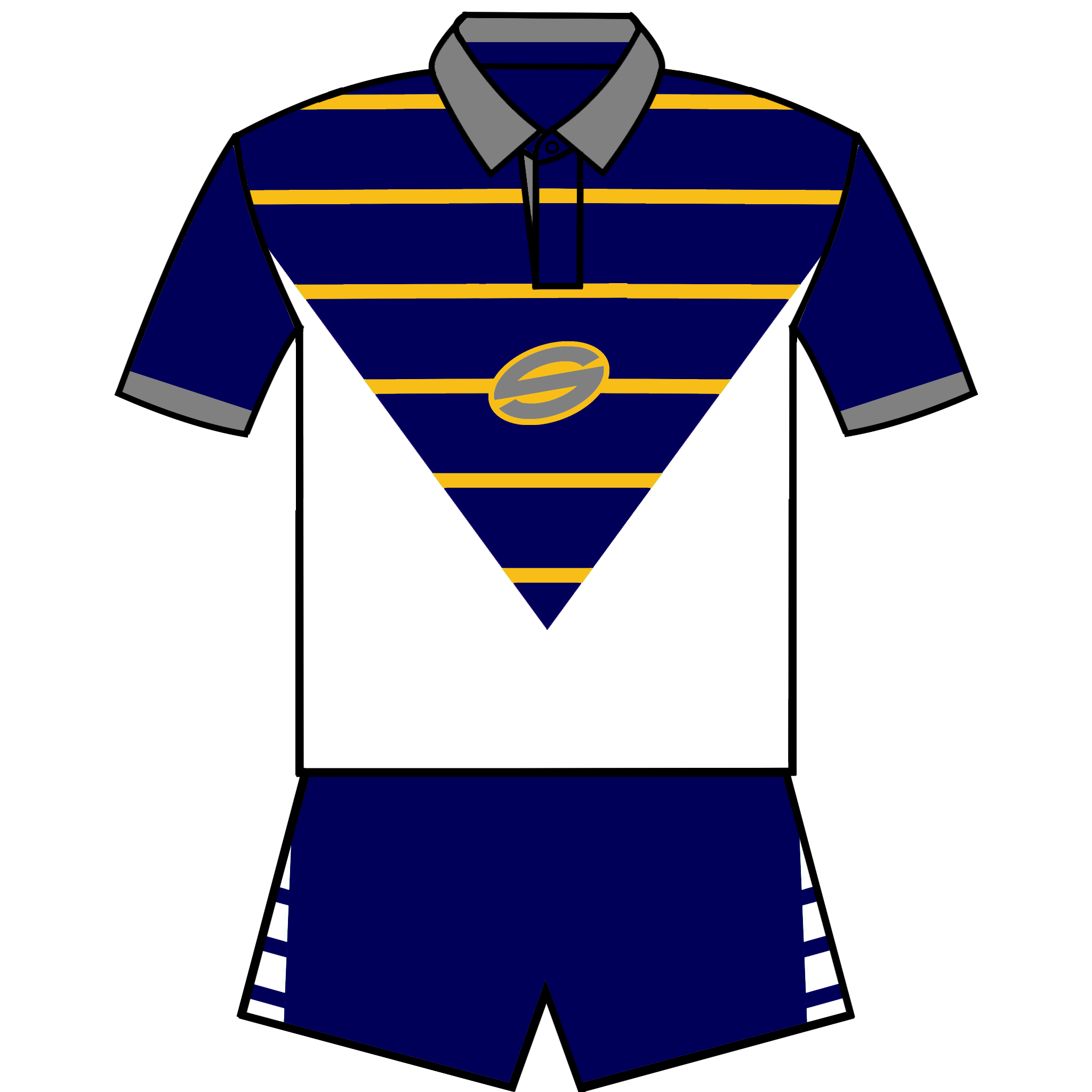
1997–1998

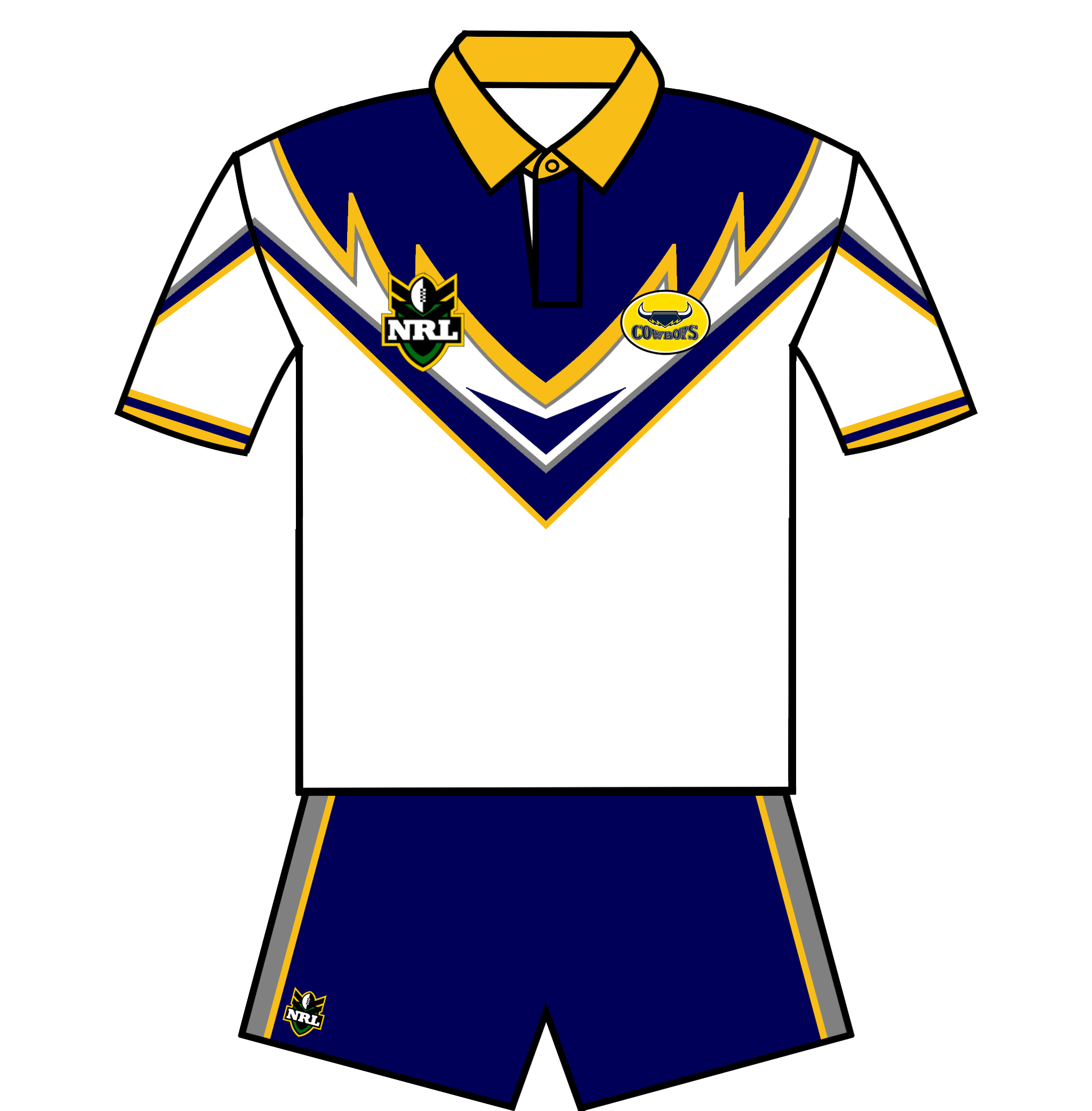
1999–2001

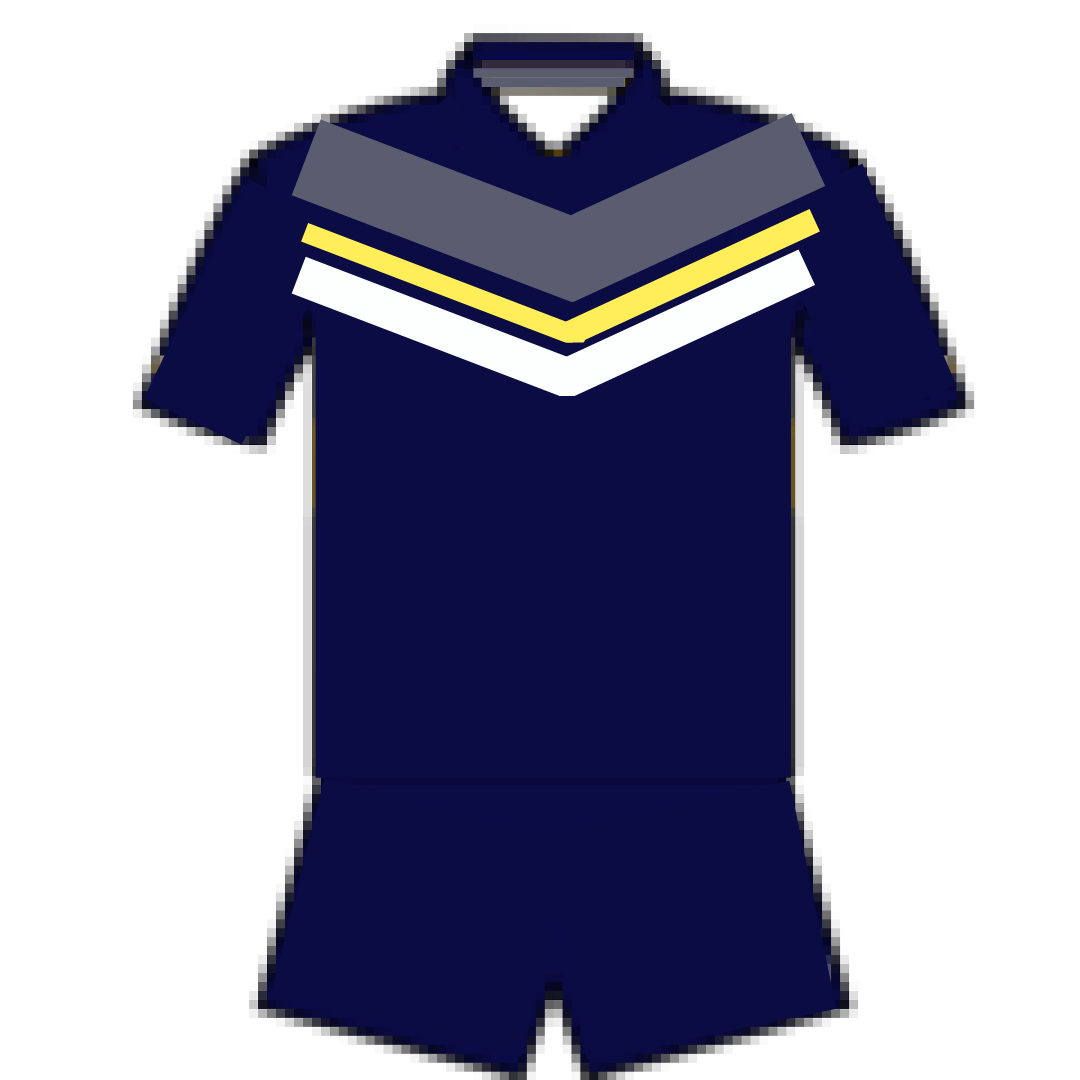
2023

The Cowboys' home jerseys have stayed predominantly navy blue over the years, with white, grey and yellow all being the predominant secondary colour at some stage, with the away jerseys predominantly white. Since 2011, the club has also worn special jerseys for Women in League round, Indigenous round and an Anzac/Defence force-themed jersey for games played on Anzac weekend.

== Sponsors ==
Year	Kit Manufacturer	Major Sponsor	Back Top Sponsor	Sleeve Sponsor	Back Bottom Sponsor	Front Shorts Sponsor	Back Shorts Sponsor	Chest Sponsor
1995-96	Canterbury of New Zealand	XXXX	XXXX	Chill Milk	-	XXXX	-	-
1997	Nike	XXXX	-	Chill Milk	-	XXXX	-	-
1998	Nike	-	-	WIN Television	-	-	-	-
1999	Fila	Overflow	Overflow	KFC	-	-	-	-
2000	Fila	Overflow	Overflow	KFC	-	Ergon Energy	-	-
2001	Fila	CHR	CHR	KFC	-	Ergon Energy	-	-
2002	EMU Sportswear	CHR	CHR	KFC	-	-	-	-
2003	EMU Sportswear	Toyota	Toyota	KFC	-	Rapid Road	Rapid Road	-
2004	Concept Sports	Toyota	Toyota	-	-	Rapid Road	Rapid Road	-
2005	Concept Sports	Toyota	Toyota	QLD Group	-	Queensland Country Bank	Queensland Country Bank	-
2006	Hummel	Toyota	Toyota	QLD Group	Harvey Norman	Queensland Country Bank	Queensland Country Bank	-
2007-08	Hummel	Toyota	Toyota	Glen Alpine	Harvey Norman	Queensland Country Bank	Queensland Country Bank	-
2009-10	Hummel	Toyota	Toyota	Harvey Norman	Harvey Norman	Queensland Country Bank	Queensland Country Bank	-
2011-12	ISC	Toyota	Toyota	Harvey Norman	Harvey Norman	Queensland Country Bank	Queensland Country Bank/Trukai	-
2013-14	ISC	Toyota	Toyota	Harvey Norman	Guildford Coal	Queensland Country Bank	Queensland Country Bank/Trukai	-
2015	ISC	Toyota	Toyota	Brisclean	Shine Lawyers	JLT	WorkPac Group/Trukai	Dreamtime Training
2016	ISC	Toyota	Toyota	The Ville Resort-Casino	Shine Lawyers	JLT	WorkPac Group/Trukai	Dreamtime Training
2017	ISC	Toyota	Toyota	The Ville Resort-Casino	Shine Lawyers	JLT	Allara Learning/Trukai	Bundaberg Rum
2018	ISC	Toyota	Toyota	The Ville Resort-Casino	Shine Lawyers	Techfront	Allara Learning/Trukai	Bundaberg Rum
2019	ISC	Toyota	Toyota	LGIAsuper	Vantage BMS	Techfront	Allara Learning/Trukai	Bundaberg Rum
2020	ISC	Toyota	Toyota	-	Vantage BMS	XXXX	Allara Learning/Trukai	Bundaberg Rum
2021	Dynasty Sport	Toyota	Toyota	Bravus Mining & Resources	Vantage BMS	XXXX	Allara Learning/Sportsbet	Bundaberg Rum
2022	Dynasty Sport	Toyota	Toyota	Bravus Mining & Resources	Hostplus	XXXX	McDonald’s/Sportsbet	Bundaberg Rum
2023	Dynasty Sport	Toyota	Toyota	Bravus Mining & Resources	Hostplus	XXXX	McDonald’s/KickAss Products	TAB
2024	Dynasty Sport	Toyota	Toyota	Bravus Mining & Resources	TAFE Queensland	XXXX	McDonald’s/Ricky Richards	YETI Coolers
2025–	Dynasty Sport	Toyota	Toyota	Bravus Mining & Resources	TAFE Queensland	XXXX	McDonald’s/Ricky Richards	YETI Coolers

== Supporters ==
In 2018, the Cowboys recorded their largest ever membership tally, with 23,437, beating the record set the previous year of 22,278. In 2020, the Cowboys membership ambassador is Kyle Feldt.

=== Average regular season attendance ===
- 1995: 21,670
- 1996: 19,366
- 1997: 17,539
- 1998: 17,034
- 1999: 16,108
- 2000: 15,511
- 2001: 13,738
- 2002: 12,133
- 2003: 14,892
- 2004: 17,334
- 2005: 20,590
- 2006: 19,861
- 2007: 20,508
- 2008: 18,102
- 2009: 17,309
- 2010: 14,256
- 2011: 14,189
- 2012: 14,637
- 2013: 14,112
- 2014: 14,613
- 2015: 16,230
- 2016: 16,692
- 2017: 16,512
- 2018: 15,417
- 2019: 13,658
- 2020: 6,712
- 2021: 14,472
- 2022: 18,376
- 2023: 19,175
- 2024: 19,710
- 2025: 18,649

=== Notable supporters ===
Notable supporters of this club, amongst others, include:

- Andy The Kid, musician
- Bob Katter, Politician
- David Crisafulli, (politician) 41st Premier of Queensland
- Nathan Burgers, professional field hockey player
- Alicia Coutts, Olympic gold medal-winning swimmer
- Luke Feldman, Australian cricketer
- Rachael Finch, former Miss Universe Australia
- David Goggins, motivational speaker
- Mike Goldman, television & radio personality
- James Hopes, Australian international cricketer
- Mitchell Johnson, Australian international cricketer
- Roz Kelly, Channel 9 reporter
- Lee Kernaghan, country music artist
- Jessica Mauboy, singer/actress
- Anna Meares, Olympic gold medal-winning cyclist
- Jack Miller, Australian Grand Prix motorcycle racer
- Morne Morkel, South African cricketer
- Chaz Mostert, V8 Supercars driver
- Ryan Phelan, Channel 7 reporter
- Robert Rose, former NBL basketballer
- Jessicah Schipper, Australian swimmer
- Melanie Schlanger, Olympic gold medal-winning swimmer
- Karrie Webb, Australia's most successful female professional golfer
- Chris Wright, Olympic swimmer

== Feeder clubs ==
- Mackay Cutters – based in Mackay, Queensland
- Northern Pride – based in Cairns, Queensland
- Townsville Blackhawks – based in Townsville, Queensland

The Cowboys players who do not make the NRL side train and play with feeder club in the Queensland Cup. These teams, based in the northern Queensland cities of Cairns and Mackay, are separate entities but are affiliated with the Cowboys.

== Partnerships ==
On 20 June 2025, the Cowboys announced a strategic partnership with Super League club Hull Kingston Rovers.

== Rivalries ==
=== Brisbane Broncos ===
North Queensland's main rivals are the Brisbane Broncos. From 1999 to 2006, the two clubs were the only Queensland-based sides in the NRL. A one-side rivalry for nearly 10 years, the Brisbane side had not lost to North Queensland in 16 encounters. In 2004, the teams met in the finals for the first time, with North Queensland defeating Brisbane 10–0, to record their first win in the derby.

In the final round of the 2020 NRL season, North Queensland condemned Brisbane to their first ever Wooden Spoon. Brisbane needed to win the match to overtake Canterbury-Bankstown but lost the match. As of 2020, the sides have met five more times in the finals, including the 2015 NRL Grand Final, the first all-Queensland Grand Final, which North Queensland won 17–16 in extra time. The rivalry between the two clubs is considered one of the best in modern rugby league.

=== Cronulla-Sutherland Sharks ===
The club has a somewhat unconventional rivalry with the Cronulla-Sutherland Sharks due to them meeting frequently in finals series. The two clubs have met seven times in the finals since 2013, with Cronulla leading the ledger 4-3. These finals matches have often been noteworthy, with Cronulla winning a 2013 final against the Cowboys courtesy of a 7th tackle try. The Cowboys would smash the Sharks 39-0 in 2015 on their way to their first premiership, before Cronulla did the same in 2016, 32-20. Just as the Sharks ended the Cowboys premiership defense, North Queensland would end Cronulla's own in the 2017 finals, winning 15-14 in extra time. The teams finished 2nd and 3rd in 2022, facing off in a qualifying final won by former Cronulla player Valentine Holmes who kicked a field goal after 93 minutes. Since 2023, the player of the match in games between the two clubs has been awarded the Paul Green Medal, in honour of Paul Green, a former player for both clubs and coach for the Cowboys who died in 2022.

== Women's team ==
On 15 June 2022, the Cowboys were admitted to the NRL Women's Premiership for the 2023 season. On 24 November 2022, Ben Jeffries was announced as the club's inaugural NRLW head coach, with Anita Creenaune appointed as Head of Women's Elite Programs. On 4 April 2023, Mackay's Emma Manzelmann became the club's inaugural signing.

== Corporate ==
Position	Name
Principal Sponsor	Toyota
Chairman	Lewis Ramsay
Chief Executive Officer	TBA
Head of Football	Micheal Luck
Chief Commercial Officer	Dean Payne
Chief Financial Officer	Michael Gilbert
Board of Directors	Joe Carey
Board of Directors	Campbell Charlton
Board of Directors	Deirdre Comerford
Board of Directors	David Myles
Board of Directors	Paul Rissman
Board of Directors	Steven Titmus
