= 2005 Dally M Awards =

- Date: 6 September
- Location: Sydney Town Hall
- Dally M Medal: Johnathan Thurston

Television/radio coverage
- Network: Fox Sports

The 2005 Dally M Awards were presented on Tuesday 6 September 2005 at the Sydney Town Hall in Sydney and broadcast on Fox Sports. Warren Smith presided as Master of Ceremonies.

== Dally M Player of the Year ==
Dally M Player of the Year
Winner:

Johnathan Thurston, North Queensland Cowboys

Top Three:

Johnathan Thurston, North Queensland Cowboys
Andrew Johns, Newcastle Knights
Ben Kennedy, Manly-Warringah Sea Eagles

== Special awards ==
Provan-Summons Medal (fan's choice for 2005's best player)
Presented by Norm Provan and Arthur Summons

Winner:

Nathan Hindmarsh, Parramatta Eels

Nominated:

Darren Lockyer, Brisbane Broncos
Andrew Johns, Newcastle Knights
Scott Prince, Wests Tigers

Peter Moore Award for Dally M Rookie of the Year
Presented by Jim Leis, 1980 Dally M Rookie of the Year

Winner:

Tim Smith, Parramatta Eels

Nominated:

Leon Bott, Brisbane Broncos
Yileen Gordon, South Sydney Rabbitohs
Greg Inglis, Melbourne Storm

Dally M Captain of the Year
Presented by Gorden Tallis

Winner:

Scott Prince, Wests Tigers

Nominated:

Trent Barrett, St George Illawarra Dragons
Nathan Cayless, Parramatta Eels
Andrew Johns, Newcastle Knights

Dally M Representative Player of the Year
Presented by Olympic and World Swimming Champion Libby Lenton

Winner:

Andrew Johns, New South Wales Halfback

Nominated:

Nathan Hindmarsh, New South Wales and Australian Second Rower
Anthony Minichiello, New South Wales and Australian Fullback
Matt King, New South Wales Winger

Dally M Coach of the Year
Presented by the Premier of New South Wales, the Hon. Morris Iemma

Winner:

Tim Sheens, Wests Tigers

Nominated:

Wayne Bennett, Brisbane Broncos
Nathan Brown, St George Illawarra Dragons
Brian Smith, Parramatta Eels

Peter Frilingos Memorial Award for the Headline Moment of the Year
Presented by David Penberthy, Editor of The Daily Telegraph and Matthew Frilingos, Peter Frilingos's son

Winner:

Andrew Johns's Return, State of Origin Game II

Nominated:

Benji Marshall Magic, Round 21
Ty Williams Try, Round 21

The broadcast then crossed live to Andrew Johns who was at the Halliwell Jones Stadium in Warrington, England, to receive the award.

Top Try Scorer
Winners:

Billy Slater, Melbourne Storm - 19 tries
Shaun Berrigan, Brisbane Broncos - 19 tries

Top Point Scorer
Winner:

Brett Hodgson, Wests Tigers - 308 points

== Team of the Year ==
Best Fullback
Winner:

Brett Hodgson, Wests Tigers

Nominated:

Matt Bowen, North Queensland Cowboys
Karmichael Hunt, Brisbane Broncos
Anthony Minichiello, Sydney Roosters
Billy Slater, Melbourne Storm

Best Winger
Winner:

Eric Grothe, Jr., Parramatta Eels

Nominated:

Colin Best, St George Illawarra Dragons
Ty Williams, North Queensland Cowboys
Matt Sing, North Queensland Cowboys

Best Centre
Winner:

Mark Gasnier, St George Illawarra Dragons

Nominated:

??

Best Five-Eighth
Winner:

Benji Marshall, Wests Tigers

Nominated:

??

Best Halfback
Winner:

Johnathan Thurston, North Queensland Cowboys

Nominated:

??

Best Lock
Winner:

Ben Kennedy, Manly-Warringah Sea Eagles

Nominated:

Paul Gallen, Cronulla Sharks
Shaun Timmins, St George Illawarra Dragons
Ashley Harrison, South Sydney Rabbitohs

Best Second Rower
Winner:

Nathan Hindmarsh, Parramatta Eels

Nominated:

Steve Menzies, Manly-Warringah Sea Eagles
Craig Fitzgibbon, Sydney Roosters
Steve Simpson, Newcastle Knights
Anthony Watmough, Manly-Warringah Sea Eagles

Best Prop
Winner:

Luke Bailey, St George Illawarra Dragons

Nominated:

Shane Webcke, Brisbane Broncos
Petero Civoniceva, Brisbane Broncos
Roy Asotasi, Canterbury Bulldogs

Best Hooker
Winner:

Danny Buderus, Newcastle Knights

Nominated:

Robbie Farah, Wests Tigers

== Hall of Fame Inductees ==
Pre-WWII

- Frank Burge (Glebe, St George; lock/second-row from 1911 to 1927)
- Harold Horder (Souths, Norths; winger from 1912 to 1924)
- Vic Hey (Wests, Ipswich, Leeds, Dewsbury, Hunslet, Parramatta; five-eighth from 1933 to 1949)

Post-WWII

- Harry Bath (Balmain, Barrow, Warrington, St George; second row from 1946 to 1959)
- Norm Provan (St George; second row from 1951 to 1965)
- Ken Irvine (Norths, Manly; winger from 1958 to 1973)

Jimmy Craig, Chris McKivat, Brian Carlson, Ron Coote, Duncan Thompson and Brian Bevan.

== See also ==
- Dally M Awards
- Dally M Medal
- National Rugby League season 2005
