= 2006 Brisbane Broncos season =

NRL rugby league season

Coordinates: 27°27′53″S 153°0′34″E

- 2006 NRL premiers
- NRL rank: 3rd
- Play-off result: Won Grand Final, (Melbourne Storm, 15–8)
- 2006 record: Wins: 14; losses: 10
- Points scored: For: 497; against: 392

Team information
- Managing Director: Bruno Cullen
- Director of Coaching: Wayne Bennett
- Captain: Darren Lockyer
- Stadium: Suncorp Stadium
- Avg. attendance: 31,208
- Agg. attendance: 374,494
- High attendance: 50,387 (New Zealand Warriors, 3 September)
- Low attendance: 20,816 (South Sydney Rabbitohs, 8 April)

Top scorers
- Tries: Darren Lockyer (13); Tame Tupou (13)
- Goals: Corey Parker (63)
- Points: Corey Parker (142)
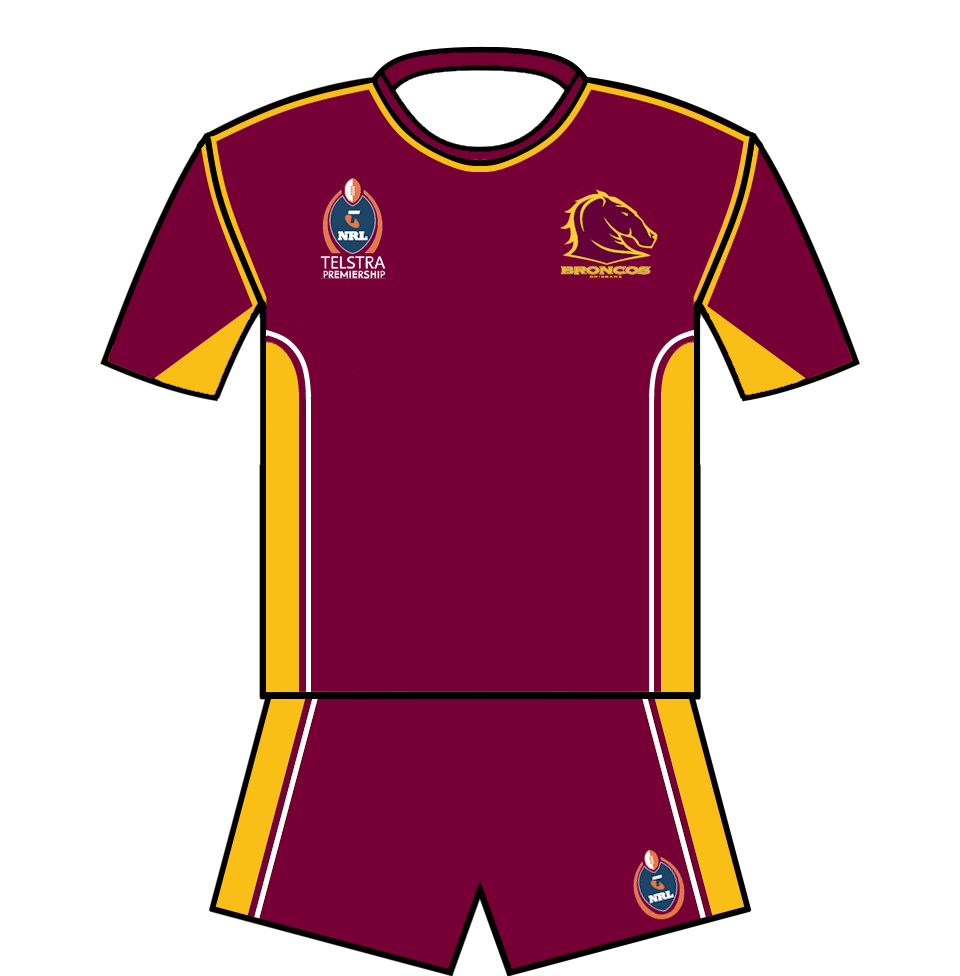
Home colours
← 2005	List of seasons	2007 →

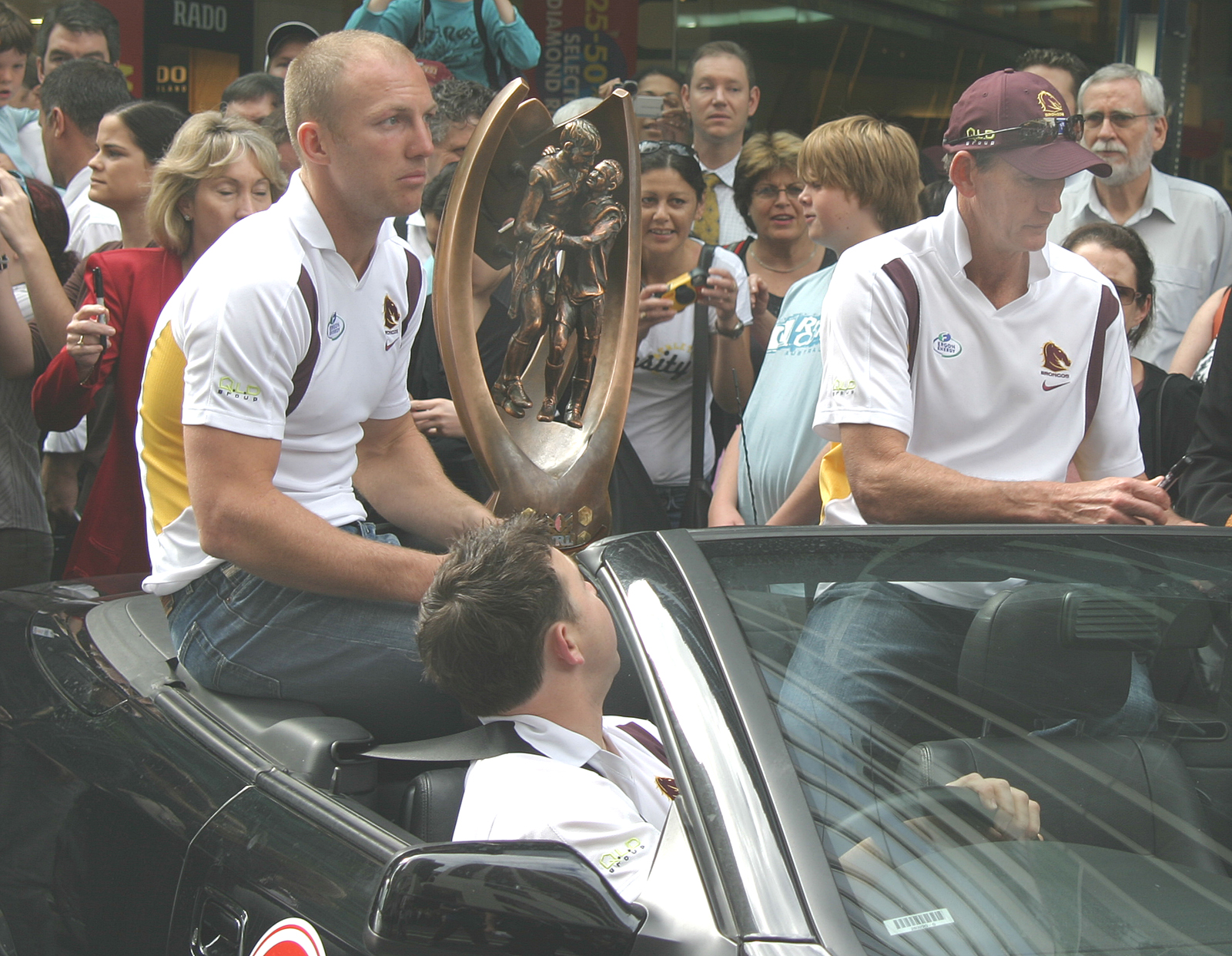
Darren Lockyer and Wayne Bennett with the NRL trophy after 2006 grand final.

The 2006 Brisbane Broncos season was the nineteenth in the club's history. Coached by Wayne Bennett and captained by Darren Lockyer, they won the NRL's 2006 Telstra Premiership, finishing the regular season in 3rd place before going on to defeat the first-placed Melbourne Storm in the 2006 NRL Grand Final (their 6th).

== Season summary ==
The Broncos did not start the 2006 season well, suffering a 36–4 defeat by the previous year's runners-up, the North Queensland Cowboys in the first round. This was the 8th consecutive loss for the club and equalled the record for longest losing streak set in 2003. Round 2 saw the Broncos get their first win for the season and their first win since Round 21, 2005, with a 16–12 victory over the Cronulla-Sutherland Sharks (this was the third game in a row in which the Brisbane Broncos beat the Cronulla Sharks 16–12 at Toyota Park). The Broncos then went on to have a strong first half of the season, winning 11 of their first 17 games. Round 8 saw Brisbane produce their biggest comeback in the club's history when they came from 18–0 down at halftime to win 30–28 over the Canberra Raiders. But the year's biggest upset came when the team, missing key players through State of Origin, lost to the last-placed and previously winless South Sydney Rabbitohs 34–14 in Round 14.

After the 2006 State of Origin series finished, Brisbane once again suffered their "post-Origin Slump", losing five consecutive games from Round 18 to Round 23 inclusive. However, strong performances against the competition leaders Melbourne Storm (losing 18–12) and a resounding victory against the Canterbury Bulldogs 30-0 the following week saw a return to form. The Broncos then defeated the injury-struck Parramatta Eels 23–0 in Round 25 and then the New Zealand Warriors 36–12 in Round 26. It was the first time since 1999 that the Broncos conceded no points in consecutive rounds.

Brisbane was heading into the finals with momentum not seen since 2000, but lost to the St. George Illawarra Dragons 20–4 in what was the highest attended Broncos game ever played at Suncorp Stadium at the time. The following week Wayne Bennett agreed to terms to continue coaching the Broncos for a further two years. The Broncos bounced back in the semi-final, defeating the Newcastle Knights by 50–6. Captain Darren Lockyer also became the Broncos' highest point-scorer with 1,077 (breaking Michael De Vere's record of 1,062 points). After trailing 20–6 at half-time against the Bulldogs in the grand final qualifier the team came back in the second half to earn a place in the 2006 NRL Grand Final with a 37–20 victory with Shaun Berrigan scoring a match-turning try in the second half.

It was the sixth time the Broncos made the Grand Final. Their opponents were the Melbourne Storm and the game was the first ever NRL Grand Final not to feature a New South Wales-based club. Despite heading into the game as underdogs, Brisbane won the match 15–8. This saw a fitting farewell to Broncos prop Shane Webcke who retired at the end of the season. The win enabled the Broncos to maintain their perfect record in grand final matches and made Wayne Bennett the most successful coach in grand final history with 6 from 6 with the Broncos. In his first year of coaching he made the Grand Final with the Canberra Raiders but lost, making his record at this time 6 from 7. His current record is 7 from 9 having won a Grand Final with the St. George Illawarra Dragons in 2010.and losing a grand final against the cowboys in 2015

The Broncos were also named "Queensland Sport Team of the Year" at the Queensland Sport Awards.

== Squad information ==
As of 1 October 2006

Cap.	Nat.	Player	Position	First Broncos game	Previous First Grade RL club
68	(Australia)	Brad Thorn	Second-row	1994	—N/a
74	(Australia)	Shane Webcke (vc)	Prop	1995	—N/a
76	(Australia)	Darren Lockyer (c)	Five-eighth	1995	—N/a
79	(Australia)	Tonie Carroll	Lock	1996	—N/a
87	(Australia)	Petero Civoniceva	Prop	1998	—N/a
93	(Australia)	Shaun Berrigan	Centre	1999	—N/a
94	(Australia)	Dane Carlaw	Second-row	1999	—N/a
100	(Australia)	Justin Hodges	Centre	2000	—N/a
106	(Australia)	Corey Parker	Second-row	2001	—N/a
110	(Australia)	Brent Tate	Centre	2001	—N/a
111	(Australia)	Casey McGuire	Hooker	2001	(Australia) Parramatta Eels
116	(Australia)	Nick Parfitt	Fullback	2002	—N/a
117	(Australia)	Scott Minto	Wing	2002	—N/a
127	(Australia)	David Stagg	Second-row	2003	—N/a
128	(Australia)	Sam Thaiday	Second-row	2003	—N/a
130	(Australia)	Karmichael Hunt	Fullback	2004	—N/a
135	(New Zealand)	Tame Tupou	Wing	2004	—N/a
138	(Australia)	Steve Michaels	Wing	2005	—N/a
139	(Australia)	Nick Kenny	Prop	2005	—N/a
140	(New Zealand)	Greg Eastwood	Lock	2005	—N/a
141	(Australia)	Darius Boyd	Wing	2006	—N/a
142	(Australia)	Shane Perry	Halfback	2006	(Australia) Canterbury-Bankstown Bulldogs
143	(Australia)	Michael Ennis	Hooker	2006	(Australia) St. George Illawarra Dragons
144	(Australia)	Ben Hannant	Prop	2006	(Australia) Sydney Roosters
145	(Australia)	Ian Lacey	Hooker	2006	—N/a
146	(New Zealand)	Fraser Anderson	Wing	2006	—N/a
147	(Australia)	Joel Moon	Centre	2006	—N/a
148	(Australia)	Dave Taylor	Prop	2006	—N/a
149	(Australia)	Nick Emmett	Centre	2006	—N/a
150	(New Zealand)	Ben Vaeau	Prop	2006	—N/a

== Squad changes ==
=== Transfers in ===
Date	Pos.	Player	From	Year/s	Ref.
30 August 2005	Prop	Ben Hannant	Sydney Roosters	1 Year	
9 October 2005	Hooker	Michael Ennis	St. George Illawarra Dragons	2 Years	
	Halfback	Shane Perry	Redcliffe Dolphins		

=== Transfers out ===
Date	Pos.	Player	To	Year/s	Ref.
15 June 2005	Five-eighth	Berrick Barnes	Queensland Reds	2 Years	
7 July 2005	Prop	Darren Mapp	Cronulla-Sutherland Sharks	2 Years	
8 July 2005	Second-row	Tom Learoyd-Lahrs	Canberra Raiders	4 Years	
	Lock	Neale Wyatt	Pia Donkeys		
	Hooker	Michael Ryan	Celtic Crusaders		
	Wing	Stuart Kelly	Retirement		
24 February 2026	Lock	Darren Smith	Retirement		
26 March 2006	Hooker	Barry Berrigan	Retirement		
30 June 2006	wing	Leon Bott	Cronulla-Sutherland Sharks		
10 August 2006	Lock	Neville Costigan	Terminated	—N/a	
10 August 2006	Halfback	Brett Seymour	Terminated	—N/a	

Date	Pos.	Player	Year/s	Ref.
29 June 2006	Fullback	Karmichael Hunt	3 Years	
29 June 2006	Hooker	Ian Lacey	2 Years	
5 July 2006	Second-row	David Stagg	3 Years	
5 July 2006	Prop	Ben Hannant	2 Years	
25 July 2006	Centre	Joel Moon	2 Years	

== Coaching staff ==
Name	Role	Ref.
Wayne Bennett	Director of Coaching	
Ivan Henjak	Assistant Coach	
Peter Ryan	Defence Co-ordinator	
Paul Green	Kicking & Catching Co-ordinator	
Dean Benton	Performance Director	
Paul Bunn	Special Projects/Recruitment Manager	
Andrew Gee	Football/Team Manager	
Dan Baker	Strength Coach	
Rob Godbolt	Physiotherapist & Rehab Co-ordinator	
Allan Langer	Backs Co-ordinator	
Ben Ikin	Team Welfare Officer	
Tony Spencer	Trainer	
Ken Rach	Trainer	
Scott Barker	Video Analysis	

== Regular season ==
=== Result by round ===
Round	1	2	3	4	5	6	7	8	9	10	11	12	13	14	15	16	17	18	19	20	21	22	23	24	25	26
Ground	H	A	H	A	H	A	H	H	A	H	–	H	A	A	H	A	H	A	–	A	H	A	H	A	A	H
Result	L	W	W	L	W	W	W	W	L	W	B	W	W	L	L	W	W	L	B	L	L	L	L	W	W	W
Position	14	12	5	9	7	4	3	3	5	4	4	1	1	2	2	2	2	3	3	3	3	3	5	5	4	3
Points	0	2	4	4	6	8	10	12	12	14	16	18	20	20	20	22	24	24	26	26	26	26	26	28	30	32

Source: National Rugby League
A = Away; H = Home; N = Neutral; B = Bye; W = Win; D = Draw; L = Loss

Round	Opponent	Result	Bro.	Opp.	Date	Venue	Crowd	Position
Trial Match	Canberra Raiders	Win	28	20	18 Feb	Port Macquarie Sports Stadium		
Trial Match	Melbourne Storm	Loss	10	58	25 Feb	Stadium Toowoomba		
1	North Queensland Cowboys	Loss	4	36	12 Mar	Suncorp Stadium	46,229	14/15
2	Cronulla-Sutherland Sharks	Win	16	12	18 Mar	Toyota Park	14,221	12/15
3	Parramatta Eels	Win	30	10	26 Mar	Suncorp Stadium	25,525	5/15
4	St George Illawarra Dragons	Loss	12	26	2 Apr	WIN Stadium	13,708	9/15
5	South Sydney Rabbitohs	Win	30	12	8 Apr	Suncorp Stadium	20,816	7/15
6	Sydney Roosters	Win	24	6	14 Apr	Sydney Football Stadium	21,246	4/15
7	Penrith Panthers	Win	30	6	23 Apr	Suncorp Stadium	25,133	3/15
8	Canberra Raiders	Win	30	28	29 Apr	Suncorp Stadium	23,582	3/15
9	Newcastle Knights	Loss	30	32	7 May	EnergyAustralia Stadium	21,252	5/15
10	Manly-Warringah Sea Eagles	Win	32	10	13 May	Suncorp Stadium	24,991	4/15
11	Bye							4/15
12*	Bulldogs RLFC	Win	25	6	27 May	Suncorp Stadium	30,589	1/15
13	New Zealand Warriors	Win	23	18	4 Jun	Mt Smart Stadium	7,746	1/15
14	South Sydney Rabbitohs	Loss	14	34	10 Jun	Telstra Stadium	6,537	2/15
15*	St George Illawarra Dragons	Loss	16	18	16 Jun	Suncorp Stadium	32,914	2/15
16	Manly-Warringah Sea Eagles	Win	16	10	25 Jun	Brookvale Oval	16,084	2/15
17	Cronulla-Sutherland Sharks	Win	26	12	2 Jul	Suncorp Stadium	25,863	2/15
18*	Melbourne Storm	Loss	4	10	7 Jul	Olympic Park	15,479	3/15
19	Bye							3/15
20	North Queensland Cowboys	Loss	10	26	22 Jul	Dairy Farmers Stadium	24,658	3/15
21	Wests Tigers	Loss	6	20	30 Jul	Suncorp Stadium	31,500	3/15
22	Canberra Raiders	Loss	18	30	6 Aug	Canberra Stadium	13,137	3/15
23	Melbourne Storm	Loss	12	18	13 Aug	Suncorp Stadium	40,195	5/15
24	Bulldogs RLFC	Win	30	0	18 Aug	Telstra Stadium	26,111	5/15
25	Parramatta Eels	Win	23	0	27 Aug	Parramatta Stadium	20,253	4/15
26	New Zealand Warriors	Win	36	12	3 Sep	Suncorp Stadium	47,193	3/15
Qualif. Final	St George Illawarra Dragons	Loss	4	20	9 Sep	Suncorp Stadium	50,387	
Semi-final	Newcastle Knights	Win	50	6	16 Sep	Sydney Football Stadium	20,081	
Prelim. Final	Bulldogs RLFC	Win	37	20	22 Sep	Sydney Football Stadium	29,511	
GRAND FINAL	Melbourne Storm	Win	15	8	1 Oct	Telstra Stadium	79,609	

- Game following a State of Origin match

== Ladder ==
2006 NRL season
Pos	Team	Pld	W	D	L	B	PF	PA	PD	Pts
1	Melbourne Storm	24	20	0	4	2	605	404	+201	44^{1}
2	Canterbury-Bankstown Bulldogs	24	16	0	8	2	608	468	+140	36
3	Brisbane Broncos (P)	24	14	0	10	2	497	392	+105	32
4	Newcastle Knights	24	14	0	10	2	608	538	+70	32
5	Manly Warringah Sea Eagles	24	14	0	10	2	534	493	+41	32
6	St George Illawarra Dragons	24	14	0	10	2	519	481	+38	32
7	Canberra Raiders	24	13	0	11	2	525	573	-48	30
8	Parramatta Eels	24	12	0	12	2	506	483	+23	28
9	North Queensland Cowboys	24	11	0	13	2	450	463	-13	26
10	New Zealand Warriors	24	12	0	12	2	552	463	+89	24^{2}
11	Wests Tigers	24	10	0	14	2	490	565	-75	24
12	Penrith Panthers	24	10	0	14	2	510	587	-77	24
13	Cronulla-Sutherland Sharks	24	9	0	15	2	515	544	-29	22
14	Sydney Roosters	24	8	0	16	2	528	650	-122	20
15	South Sydney Rabbitohs	24	3	0	21	2	429	772	-343	10

^{1} The Melbourne Storm were later stripped of this minor premiership due to gross salary cap breaches.
^{2} The New Zealand Warriors were deducted 4 competition points due to gross salary cap breaches.

== Crowds ==
The Brisbane Broncos had the biggest NRL season crowd average for 2006. The average crowd (including the Qualifying Final) for 2006 was 32,681

*=includes finals matches played at home or away
Games	Played	Crowd Total	Average
All Games	28	754,550	26,948
Home Games*	13	424,917	32,685
Away Games*	15	329,633	21,976
Finals	4	179,588	44,897

All Games*: Played:28 Total: 754,550 Average: 26,948
Home Games: Played: 13 Total: 424,917 Average: 32,685
Away Games: Played:15 Total: 329,633 Average: 21,976
Finals*: Played: 4 Total: 179,588 Average: 44,897

== Grand final ==
Brisbane	Position	Melbourne
Justin Hodges	Fullback	Billy Slater
Darius Boyd	Wing	Matt Geyer
Brent Tate	Centre	Matt King
David Stagg	Centre	Greg Inglis
Karmichael Hunt	Wing	Steve Turner
Darren Lockyer (C)	Five-eighth	Scott Hill
Shane Perry	Halfback	Cooper Cronk
Shane Webcke	Prop	Antonio Kaufusi
Shaun Berrigan	Hooker	Cameron Smith (C)
Petero Civoniceva	Prop	Brett White
Sam Thaiday	Second Row	David Kidwell
Brad Thorn	Second Row	Ryan Hoffman
Tonie Carroll	Lock	Dallas Johnson
Corey Parker	Interchange	Adam Blair
Dane Carlaw	Interchange	Jeremy Smith
Ben Hannant	Interchange	Ben Cross
Casey McGuire	Interchange	Nathan Friend
Wayne Bennett	COACH	Craig Bellamy

Brisbane played against minor premiers the Melbourne Storm in the Grand Final and came out 15–8 winners. It was a perfect farewell for retiring prop Shane Webcke. The Broncos maintained their 100% win record in Grand Finals (1992, 1993, 1997, 1998, 2000 and 2006). The six Premierships make Wayne Bennett the most successful club coach in Australian club football history.

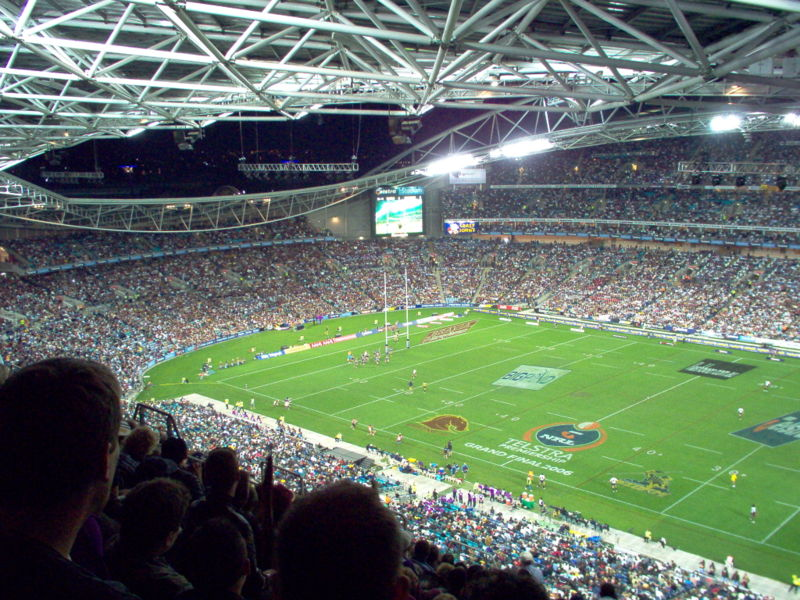
The 2006 NRL Grand Final

Brisbane 15 (TRIES: Hodges, Tate; GOALS: Lockyer 2/2, Parker 1/2; FIELD GOALS: Lockyer)

defeated

Melbourne 8 (TRIES: Turner, King; GOALS: Smith 0/1, Geyer 0/1)

Halftime: Brisbane 8–4

Referee: Paul Simpkins

Stadium: Telstra Stadium (Sydney)

Crowd: 79,609

Clive Churchill Medal: Shaun Berrigan (Brisbane)

When They Scored

10th Minute: Brisbane 2-0 (Darren Lockyer penalty goal)
14th Minute: Melbourne 4-2 (Steve Turner try)
19th Minute: Brisbane 8-4 (Justin Hodges try; Darren Lockyer goal)
48th Minute: 8-8 (Matt King try)
60th Minute: Brisbane 10-8 (Corey Parker penalty goal)
62nd Minute: Brisbane 14-8 (Brent Tate try)
73rd Minute: Brisbane 15-8 (Darren Lockyer field goal)

== Representative honours ==
This table lists all players who played a representative match in 2006.

Player	2006 Anzac Test	State of Origin 1	State of Origin 2	State of Origin 3	Tri-Nations
Shaun Berrigan	—	Queensland	Queensland	Queensland	Australia
Tonie Carroll	—	—	—	Queensland	—
Petero Civoniceva	Australia	Queensland	Queensland	Queensland	Australia
Justin Hodges	—	Queensland	Queensland	—	Australia
Karmichael Hunt	Australia	—	Queensland	—	Australia
Darren Lockyer (c)	Australia (c)	Queensland (c)	Queensland (c)	Queensland (c)	Australia (c)
David Stagg	—	Queensland	—	—	Australia
Brent Tate	—	Queensland	Queensland	Queensland	Australia
Sam Thaiday	—	Queensland	Queensland	Queensland	Australia
Tame Tupou	New Zealand	—N/a	—N/a	—N/a	New Zealand

== Honours ==
=== League ===
- Telstra Premiership

=== Club ===
- Player of the year: Petero Civoniceva
- Rookie of the year: Darius Boyd
- Back of the year: Darren Lockyer
- Forward of the year: Brad Thorn
- Club man of the year: Andrew Gee

=== Player statistics ===
Player	Tries	Goals	FG	Points
Corey Parker	4	63/89	0	142
Darren Lockyer	13	19/24	5	95
Tame Tupou	13	0	0	52
Darius Boyd	11	0	0	44
Justin Hodges	10	1/1	0	42
Shaun Berrigan	9	0	0	36
Karmichael Hunt	7	0	0	28
Greg Eastwood	6	0	0	24
Brent Tate	5	0	0	20
Shane Webcke	4	0	0	16
Brad Thorn	4	0	0	16
Brett Seymour	3	0/1	0	12
Michael Ennis	0	6/11	0	12
Petero Civoniceva	3	0	0	12
David Stagg	3	0	0	12
Sam Thaiday	2	0	0	8
Dane Carlaw	2	0	0	8
Fraser Anderson	1	0	0	4
Leon Bott	1	0	0	4
Casey McGuire	1	0	0	4
Tonie Carroll	1	0	0	4
Stephen Michaels	1	0	0	4
Shane Perry	1	0	0	4
TOTAL	105	89	5	603
