= 2006 Anzac Test =

Australia	New Zealand
50	12
	1	2	Total
AUS	14	36	50
NZL	6	6	12
- Date: 5 May 2006
- Stadium: Suncorp Stadium
- Location: Brisbane, Queensland, Australia
- Referee: Ashley Klein (Australia)
- Attendance: 44,191

Broadcast partners
- Broadcasters: Nine Network
- Commentators: Ray Warren; Phil Gould; Peter Sterling

The 2006 Anzac Test was a rugby league test match played between Australia and New Zealand at Suncorp Stadium in Brisbane on 5 May 2006. It was the 7th Anzac test played between the two nations since the first was played under the Super League banner in 1997 and the second to be played in Brisbane. It marked the farewell appearance from representative football for Australian rugby league Immortal Andrew Johns and his only appearance alongside future immortal Jonathon Thurston who came off the bench and played five eighth after an injury to fullback Karmichael Hunt caused starting five eight Darren Lockyer to shift to the back.

== Teams ==
Australia	Position	New Zealand
Karmichael Hunt	Fullback	Brent Webb
Matt King	Wing	Jake Webster
Mark Gasnier	Centre	Clinton Toopi
Matt Cooper	Centre	Paul Whatuira
Timana Tahu	Wing	Tame Tupou
Darren Lockyer (c)	Five-eighth	Nigel Vagana (c)
Andrew Johns	Halfback	Thomas Leuluai
Willie Mason	Prop	Jason Cayless
Danny Buderus	Hooker	Louis Anderson
Petero Civoniceva	Prop	Nathan Cayless
Luke O'Donnell	2nd Row	David Kidwell
Nathan Hindmarsh	2nd Row	David Fa'alogo
Ben Kennedy	Lock	Sonny Bill Williams
Johnathan Thurston	Interchange	Benji Marshall
Mark O'Meley	Interchange	David Faiumu
Steve Menzies	Interchange	Roy Asotasi
Steve Simpson	Interchange	Frank Pritchard
Ricky Stuart	Coach	Brian McClennan

== Match summary ==
5 May 2006
7:30pm (AEST)

Australia	50 – 12	New Zealand
Tries: Timana Tahu (45', 55') 2 Darren Lockyer (71', 80') 2 Matt Cooper (17') 1 Mark Gasnier (25') 1 Nathan Hindmarsh (52') 1 Danny Buderus (77') 1 Goals: Andrew Johns 8/9 (4' pen, 18', 35' pen, 46', 53', 56', 72', 80'); Ben Kennedy 1/1 (78')	1st: 14 - 6; 2nd: 36 - 6 Report	Tries: David Kidwell (12') 1 Sonny Bill Williams (48') 1 Goals: Brent Webb 2/4 (30' pen, 49')

Suncorp Stadium
Attendance: 44,191
Referee: Ashley Klein (Australia)
