= 2001 Kangaroo tour =

2001 rugby league tour

- Date: 11 November 2001 – 24 November 2001
- Coach(es): Chris Anderson
- Tour captain(s): Brad Fittler
- Top point scorer(s): Andrew Johns (34)
- Top try scorer(s): Andrew Johns (3)
Summary
P	W	D	L
Total
3	2	0	1
Test match
3	2	0	1
Opponent
P	W	D	L
Great Britain
3	2	0	1

Tour chronology
- Previous tour: 1994
- Next tour: 2003

The 2001 Kangaroo Tour was the Australia national rugby league team's nineteenth Kangaroo tour of Great Britain. The truncated tour featured only the three Ashes series Test matches against Great Britain. The 2001 tour was almost abandoned due to military action in the wake of the September 11 attacks. Australia continued its dominance, winning two of the three tests against Great Britain and retaining The Ashes that they have held since 1973.

== Background ==
The 2001 Kangaroo tour was initially cancelled by the Australian Rugby League (ARL) but after strong public opinion in both Great Britain and Australia, it went ahead. However, the only games played were the three tests, marking the first Kangaroo Tour to not play against any British club or provincial teams. The 2001 tour was also the first since 1933–34 not to include a Test match against France along with The Ashes series.

== Touring Squad ==
The team was coached by Chris Anderson who was making his third Kangaroo Tour, and first as coach, after playing in the 1978 and 1982 tours, the second in 1982 as a member of the famed "Invincibles". Team captain was Brad Fittler, the youngest ever Kangaroo tourist in 1990 at the age of 18, was making his third and last Kangaroo Tour after being part of the successful 1990 and 1994 touring teams. Fittler was also the only member of the squad that had previously taken part in a Kangaroo tour.

Player	Club	Position(s)	Games	Tries	Goals	F/Goals	Points
Braith Anasta	Canterbury Bulldogs	Five-eighth	3	1	0	0	4
Trent Barrett	St. George Illawarra Dragons	Five-eighth, Halfback	3	2	0	0	8
Nathan Blacklock	St. George Illawarra Dragons	Wing	1	0	0	0	0
Danny Buderus	Newcastle Knights	Hooker	3	0	0	0	0
Dane Carlaw	Brisbane Broncos	Prop, Second-row	3	0	0	0	0
Petero Civoniceva	Brisbane Broncos	Prop	3	0	0	0	0
Brad Fittler (c)	Sydney Roosters	Five-eighth	3	1	1	0	6
Mark Gasnier	St. George Illawarra Dragons	Centre	0	0	0	0	0
Matthew Gidley	Newcastle Knights	Centre	3	1	0	0	4
Andrew Johns	Newcastle Knights	Halfback	3	3	11	0	34
Robbie Kearns	Melbourne Storm	Prop	3	0	0	0	0
Ben Kennedy	Newcastle Knights	Lock	3	1	0	0	4
Darren Lockyer	Brisbane Broncos	Fullback	3	2	0	0	8
Jamie Lyon	Parramatta Eels	Centre	3	0	0	0	0
Adam MacDougall	Newcastle Knights	Centre, Wing	3	2	0	0	8
Brad Meyers	Brisbane Broncos	Second-row, Prop	2	1	0	0	4
Jason Ryles	St. George Illawarra Dragons	Prop	3	0	0	0	0
Jason Stevens	Cronulla Sharks	Prop	3	0	0	0	0
Lote Tuqiri	Brisbane Broncos	Wing	2	0	0	0	0
Michael Vella	Parramatta Eels	Prop	2	0	0	0	0
Daniel Wagon	Parramatta Eels	Lock, Wing	0	0	0	0	0

== Ashes series ==
=== Test Venues ===
The three Ashes series tests took place at the following venues.

Huddersfield	Bolton	Wigan
Kirklees Stadium	Reebok Stadium	JJB Stadium
Capacity: 24,500	Capacity: 28,700	Capacity: 25,138

=== Results ===
Date	Opponent	Score	Ground	Referee	Crowd	Report
November 11	Great Britain	20 – 12	Alfred McAlpine Stadium, Huddersfield	R. Connolly (GB)	21,458	bbc.co.uk
November 17	Great Britain	12 – 40	Reebok Stadium, Bolton	B. Harrigan (AUS)	22,152	bbc.co.uk
November 24	Great Britain	8 – 28	JJB Stadium, Wigan	B. Harrigan (AUS)	25,011	bbc.co.uk

=== 1st Test ===
11 November 2001

Great Britain	20 – 12	Australia
Tries; Paul Sculthorpe (2); Jamie Peacock; Goals; Andy Farrell (3); Paul Sculthorpe (2)		Tries; Adam MacDougall; Andrew Johns; Goals; Andrew Johns (2)

Kirklees Stadium, Huddersfield
Attendance: 21,758
Referee: Robert Connolly (United Kingdom)
Player of the Match: Paul Sculthorpe

Great Britain	Position	Australia
Kris Radlinski	FB	Darren Lockyer
Leon Pryce	WG	Lote Tuqiri
Gary Connolly	CE	Matthew Gidley
Paul Johnson	CE	Jamie Lyon
Keith Senior	WG	Adam MacDougall
Paul Sculthorpe	SO	Trent Barrett
Mike Forshaw	SH	Andrew Johns
Terry O'Connor	PR	Jason Stevens
Kevin Sinfield	HK	Danny Buderus
Barrie McDermott	PR	Robbie Kearns
Chris Joynt	SR	Dane Carlaw
Jamie Peacock	SR	Ben Kennedy
Andy Farrell (c)	LF	Brad Fittler (c)
Paul Wellens	Int.	Braith Anasta
Richard Horne	Int.	Michael Vella
Paul Anderson	Int.	Petero Civoniceva
Stuart Fielden	Int.	Jason Ryles
David Waite	Coach	Chris Anderson

Great Britain led 12 nil at half time but after the break Australia came back strongly. The home side were able to get the upset in the end.

=== 2nd Test ===
17 November 2001

Great Britain	12 – 40	Australia
Tries; Leon Pryce; Paul Sculthorpe Goals; Andy Farrell (2)		Tries; Andrew Johns (2); Braith Anasta; Brad Fittler; Ben Kennedy; Darren Lockyer; Adam MacDougall; Goals; Andrew Johns (6)

Reebok Stadium, Bolton
Attendance: 22,152
Referee: Bill Harrigan (Australia)
Player of the Match: Andrew Johns

Great Britain	Position	Australia
Kris Radlinski	FB	Darren Lockyer
Leon Pryce	WG	Lote Tuqiri
Gary Connolly	CE	Matthew Gidley
Keith Senior	CE	Jamie Lyon
Paul Johnson	WG	Adam MacDougall
Paul Sculthorpe	SO	Trent Barrett
Kevin Sinfield	SH	Andrew Johns
Terry O'Connor	PR	Jason Stevens
Mike Forshaw	HK	Danny Buderus
Barrie McDermott	PR	Robbie Kearns
Chris Joynt	SR	Dane Carlaw
Jamie Peacock	SR	Ben Kennedy
Andy Farrell (c)	LF	Brad Fittler (c)
Paul Wellens	Int.	Braith Anasta
Richard Horne	Int.	Michael Vella
Paul Anderson	Int.	Petero Civoniceva
Stuart Fielden	Int.	Brad Meyers
David Waite	Coach	Chris Anderson

After trailing 40 nil at half time, Great Britain's two tries in the final ten minutes were too little too late. The main contributors of Australia's victory were scrum half back Andrew Johns, who scored two tries and kicked all but one of the six conversions, and fullback Darren Lockyer.

=== 3rd Test ===
For the first time since the 1986 Kangaroo tour of Great Britain and France, the Lions and Kangaroos had met in Wigan.

24 November 2001

Great Britain	8 – 28	Australia
Tries; Paul Johnson Goals; Andy Farrell (2)		Tries; Trent Barrett (2); Matthew Gidley; Darren Lockyer; Brad Meyers; Goals; Andrew Johns (3); Brad Fittler

JJB Stadium, Wigan
Attendance: 25,011
Referee: Bill Harrigan (Australia)
Player of the Match: Trent Barrett

Great Britain	Position	Australia
Paul Wellens	FB	Darren Lockyer
Leon Pryce	WG	Nathan Blacklock
Gary Connolly	CE	Matthew Gidley
Keith Senior	CE	Jamie Lyon
Paul Johnson	WG	Adam MacDougall
Paul Sculthorpe	SO	Trent Barrett
Paul Deacon	SH	Andrew Johns
Stuart Fielden	PR	Jason Stevens
Mike Forshaw	HK	Danny Buderus
Barrie McDermott	PR	Robbie Kearns
Chris Joynt	SR	Dane Carlaw
Terry O'Connor	SR	Ben Kennedy
Andy Farrell (c)	LF	Brad Fittler (c)
Kevin Sinfield	Int.	Braith Anasta
David Hodgson	Int.	Brad Meyers
Paul Anderson	Int.	Petero Civoniceva
Jamie Peacock	Int.	Jason Ryles
David Waite	Coach	Chris Anderson

Great Britain scored the opening try of the match early in the first half, but by the break trailed 12-6 behind Australia. During the first half of the game, Australia's coach Chris Anderson suffered a heart attack and was taken to hospital.

== Statistics ==
Leading Try Scorer

- 3 by Andrew Johns

Leading Point Scorer

- 34 by Andrew Johns (3 tries, 11 goals)

Largest Attendance

- 25,011 - Third test vs Great Britain at JJB Stadium
