= Leon Bott =

Australian rugby league & union footballer

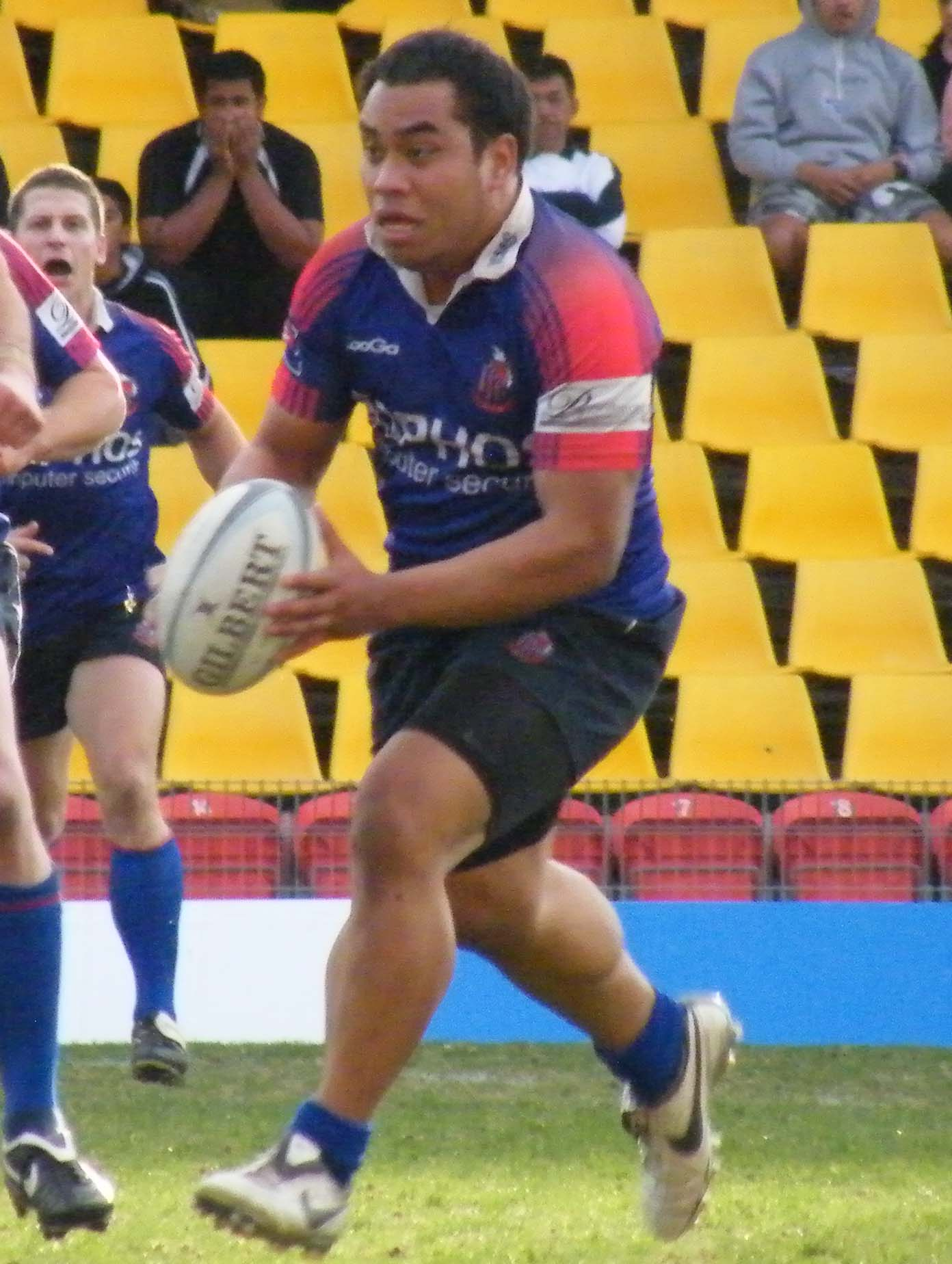
- Bott playing for Manly RUFC

Personal information
- Full name: Leon Bott
- Born: 19 October 1981 (age 44) Canterbury, New South Wales, Australia
- Height: 180 cm (5 ft 11 in)
- Weight: 98 kg (15 st 6 lb)

Playing information

Rugby league
- Position: Wing, Centre
Club
Years	Team	Pld	T	G	FG	P
2005–06	Brisbane Broncos	26	22	0	0	56
2006	Cronulla Sharks	1	0	0	0	0
	Total	27	22	0	0	56

Rugby union
Club
Years	Team	Pld	T	G	FG	P
2009–2011	Manly RUFC	36	40	0	0	50
- Source: As of 20 Sep 2022

Leon Bott (born 19 October 1981 in Canterbury, New South Wales) is an Australian former professional rugby league and union footballer.

== Early years ==
Bott attended Lurnea Public School, Lurnea High School, Moorebank High School and Westfield Sports High School, making the Australian Schoolboys rugby union team in 1998 and 1999.

== Career ==
=== Brisbane Broncos ===
Bott made his debut in the National Rugby League in the 2005 season playing for the Brisbane Broncos, the club he followed as a boy. He signed with the Brisbane Broncos for a reported A$20,000 a year and reportedly turned down a contract from the Sydney Roosters worth around A$350,000 a year. It proved to be worthwhile for Bott who played in 24 games and scored 13 tries for the Broncos including a hat-trick against the St George Dragons in Round 6. At the end of the 2005 season Leon Bott won the Brisbane Broncos 2005 Rookie of the Year Award. He was also nominated for the Dally M Rookie of the Year the same year but missed out to Parramatta Eels half-back Tim Smith.

The 2006 season would not be as bright for Bott as his rookie season proved to be as he injured his shoulder and struggled to hold down a wing slot at the Broncos due to eventual Brisbane Broncos 2006 Rookie of the Year award winner Darius Boyd playing very strongly. After such a strong rookie season in 2005 in the NRL he only played once for the Broncos in 2006 and became frustrated being stuck playing with the Broncos feeder club side Toowoomba Clydesdales in the Queensland Cup and eventually asked for a release from the Broncos and signed mid-season with the Cronulla Sharks.

=== Cronulla-Sutherland Sharks ===
Again Bott never had a concrete role in the first grade squad at Cronulla and after only one appearance in the NRL in the 2006 season he again asked for a release at the end of the year.

=== Canterbury-Bankstown ===
Bott joined Canterbury during the 2007 pre-season on a train-and-trial basis but medical staff discovered his shoulder was not stable and he required reconstructive surgery. After going through extensive rehabilitation and one-on-one fitness sessions with Canterbury trainers, he was signed with Canterbury until the end of the 2008 season.

== Rugby Union ==
Bott switched back to rugby union, the code he grew up playing at school, to play for Manly RUFC in the 2009 Shute Shield season. In August 2009, Bott made headlines after inflicting a dangerous tackle on Randwick's David Dillon. After a ball was kicked high in the air, Bott flattened Dillon without the ball which resulted in Dillon being taken to hospital with a ruptured spleen. Despite protests from Randwick, Bott was allowed to remain on the field.

Bott played season 2010 for Penrith Emus in the Shute Shield.
