= Tame Tupou =

New Zealand international rugby league footballer

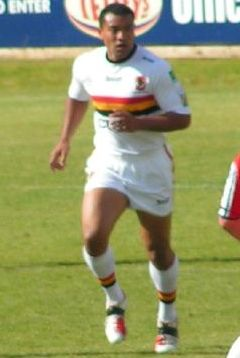

Personal information
- Full name: Siokatame Gary Tupou
- Born: 22 October 1982 (age 44) Auckland, New Zealand

Playing information
- Height: 191 cm (6 ft 3 in)
- Weight: 114 kg (17 st 13 lb)
- Position: Wing
Club
Years	Team	Pld	T	G	FG	P
2004–06	Brisbane Broncos	25	15	0	0	60
2007–08	Bradford Bulls	25	16	0	0	52
	Total	50	31	0	0	112
Representative
Years	Team	Pld	T	G	FG	P
2006–07	New Zealand	4	0	0	0	0

Siokatame Gary Tupou also known as Tame Tupou and Gary Tupou (born 22 October 1982) is a New Zealand former professional rugby league footballer who played in the 2000s. He played at representative level for New Zealand, usually as a wing, but also as a second-row. He first played in the National Rugby League for Australian club, the Brisbane Broncos, and then in the Super League for English club, the Bradford Bulls.

== Background ==
Tupou was born in Auckland and played rugby league in his early years for Ellerslie Eagles before attending boarding school in South Auckland, Wesley College. There he played for the school's 1st XV rugby union team. After his years in college, he returned to rugby league, playing in the Bartercard Cup before being signed to the National Rugby League.

== Broncos ==
Tupou made his National Rugby League début for the Brisbane Broncos in 2004. His size and speed led many Broncos fans to hope he could help fill the huge gap left in the Broncos' wings since Wendell Sailor and Lote Tuqiri left the club to play for the Wallabies.

Tupou made his international début for the New Zealand Kiwis in the 2006 ANZAC Test. In the 2006 season, a year the Broncos won the premiership, Tupou was the Broncos' joint top try-scorer, along with captain Darren Lockyer. He scored more than once in several matches, earning him the nickname "two-tries Tupou". He also continued to play on the wing for New Zealand in the end of season 2006 Tri-Nations.

== Bradford ==
In April 2007 Tupou signed for English club Bradford Bulls. Tupou made his début for Bradford against Huddersfield Giants in the quarter-finals of the 2007 Challenge Cup on 6 June with two tries as a substitute in the Bulls' win. He enjoyed a good start to his Bulls career by scoring 10 tries in 11 games that season. At the end of that year Tupou was selected for New Zealand's 2007 All Golds tour of Great Britain.

Tupou made a poor start in 2008 due to knee injuries, starting in three games and coming on as a substitute in others. In August that year he was named in the Tonga training squad for the 2008 Rugby League World Cup but was not selected in the final squad after he had to undergo another knee reconstruction.

In April 2009 Bradford released Tupou after a Rugby Football League tribunal allowed the club to exercise a clause in his contract which stated that the player's contract could be terminated if he was unable to play or train for a 26-week period in any one year.

== Wests Tigers ==
In July 2009 it was announced by Bradford that Tupou had signed for the Wests Tigers in the NRL competition with immediate effect. Tupou failed to make any appearances in the 2009 or 2010 seasons due to his on going battle with knee injuries. Tupou retired in 2010 due to his constant injury problems.
