= Dane Carlaw =

Australia international rugby league footballer

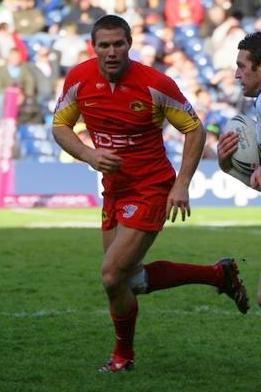
- Carlaw playing for Catalans in 2009

Personal information
- Born: 21 February 1980 (age 46) Brisbane, Queensland, Australia

Playing information
- Height: 192 cm (6 ft 4 in)
- Weight: 107 kg (16 st 12 lb)
- Position: Second-row, Lock, Prop
Club
Years	Team	Pld	T	G	FG	P
1999–07	Brisbane Broncos	183	25	0	0	100
2008–10	Catalans Dragons	81	12	0	0	48
2011	Brisbane Broncos	7	0	0	0	0
	Total	271	37	0	0	148
Representative
Years	Team	Pld	T	G	FG	P
2001–07	Queensland	13	4	0	0	16
2001–03	Australia	6	0	0	0	0

Dane Carlaw (born 21 February 1980 in Brisbane, Queensland) is an Australian former professional rugby league footballer who played in the 2000s and 2010s. An Australia national and Queensland State of Origin representative forward, he played in Australia for National Rugby League club, the Brisbane Broncos (with whom he won the 2000 and 2006 NRL Premierships) and in France for Super League club, Catalans Dragons.

== Playing career ==
While attending Padua College, Carlaw played for the Australian Schoolboys team in 1997.

A reliable workhorse in the second row, Carlaw won the Broncos' rookie of the year award in 2000 and also tasted premiership success with the club at the end of his first season, playing at prop in the 2000 NRL grand final victory over the Sydney Roosters. He has represented Queensland and, at his peak, Australia.

At the end of the 2001 NRL season, he went on the 2001 Kangaroo tour. In Game 3 of the 2002 State of Origin series, Carlaw scored a try for Queensland with 42 seconds left to tie the match at 18-18 and the series at one game a piece. As the match was tied and due to Queensland winning the shield a year prior, Queensland retained the shield by default.

In the 2006 NRL Grand Final Carlaw was selected to play from the interchange bench for Brisbane who won the match, claiming another premiership. As 2006 NRL Premiers, the Brisbane Broncos travelled to England to face 2006 Super League champions, St Helens R.F.C. in the 2007 World Club Challenge. Carlaw played as a prop forward in the Broncos' 14–18 loss.

Carlaw moved to Catalans after the 2007 NRL season. In 2010 he became eligible to play for France after having spent three years playing in the country. On 23 November, Carlaw was released from the club to return home to Australia.

On 30 November 2010, he re-signed with Brisbane Broncos on a one-year deal He played for the Wynnum Manly Seagulls in the 2011 Queensland Cup.

== Statistics ==
Year	Team	Games	Tries	Pts
1999	Brisbane Broncos	3		
2000	Brisbane Broncos	24	3	12
2001	Brisbane Broncos	26	7	28
2002	Brisbane Broncos	21	1	4
2003	Brisbane Broncos	23	5	20
2004	Brisbane Broncos	22	2	8
2005	Brisbane Broncos	18	2	8
2006	Brisbane Broncos	20	2	8
2007	Brisbane Broncos	24	3	12
2008	Catalans Dragons	28	3	12
2009	Catalans Dragons	23	2	8
2010	Catalans Dragons	30	6	24
2011	Brisbane Broncos	7		
	Totals	271	37	148

== Post playing ==
After retiring from the NRL, Carlaw became a firefighter. In 2013, Carlaw just a year after he retired from the sport he played in a charity match to honour those who served during September 11. In 2017, Carlaw played in a charity match for fallen Queensland police officer Brett Forte.
