= Petero Civoniceva =

Former Australia & Fiji international rugby league footballer

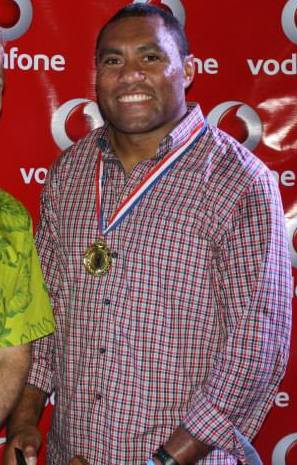

Personal information
- Born: 21 April 1976 (age 50) Suva, Fiji

Playing information
- Height: 193 cm (6 ft 4 in)
- Weight: 116 kg (18 st 4 lb)
- Position: Prop, Second-row
Club
| Years | Team | Pld | T | G | FG | P |
|---|---|---|---|---|---|---|
| 1998–07 | Brisbane Broncos | 215 | 22 | 0 | 0 | 88 |
| 2008–11 | Penrith Panthers | 74 | 3 | 0 | 0 | 12 |
| 2012 | Brisbane Broncos | 20 | 0 | 0 | 0 | 0 |
| | Total | 309 | 25 | 0 | 0 | 100 |
Representative
| Years | Team | Pld | T | G | FG | P |
| 2001–12 | Queensland | 33 | 1 | 0 | 0 | 4 |
| 2001–11 | Australia | 45 | 2 | 0 | 0 | 8 |
| 2009 | Prime Minister's XIII | 1 | 0 | 0 | 0 | 0 |
| 2013–14 | Fiji | 6 | 0 | 0 | 0 | 0 |

Petero Civoniceva (Fijian pronunciation: [petero ðɪβoniðeβa] (Thee-vo-nee-thee-vah); born 21 April 1976), is a Fijian-Australian former professional rugby league footballer who played in the 1990s, 2000s and 2010s. A Queensland State of Origin and Australian international representative prop forward, in 2009 he broke the record for most international matches for Australia of any forward in history. Civoniceva played his club football for the Brisbane Broncos, with whom he won the 1998, 2000 and 2006 NRL Premierships, as well as for the Penrith Panthers, whom he captained. Late in his career whilst playing for the Redcliffe Dolphins in the Queensland Cup, Civoniceva captained the Fiji national team in their 2013 Rugby League World Cup campaign. The Petero Civoniceva Medal is awarded to the Australian Fijian rugby league footballer of the year, while the Civoniceva Medal is awarded to the Queensland Cup player voted as the best and fairest.

== Early life ==
Civoniceva was born in Suva, Fiji, where his father, Petero Sr, was a rugby union player. Civoniceva's parents moved to Redcliffe, Queensland before his first birthday. There he attended Humpybong State School, then Redcliffe State High School before finishing his senior schooling at Frawley College, now known as Southern Cross Catholic College. He played junior football for the Redcliffe Dolphins until 1994.

== Playing career ==
=== Domestic career ===
==== Brisbane Broncos ====
After playing 39 reserve grade games he began his NRL career as a centre with the Brisbane Broncos. He won the club's Rookie of the Year award in 1998 and went on to play from the bench in Brisbane's 1998 NRL grand final win at the end of the season.

Civoniceva missed the Broncos grand final victory in 2000 due to injury, as well as Australia's 2000 World Cup campaign.

Having won the 2000 NRL Premiership, the Broncos travelled to England to play against 2000's Super League V Champions, St Helens R.F.C. for the 2001 World Club Challenge, with Civoniceva playing at prop forward in Brisbane's loss.

Civoniceva won the Brisbane club's coveted Player of the Year award in 2004.

He was the 2006 Brisbane Broncos season's player of the year and he played at prop in the Broncos' 2006 NRL Grand Final victory.

As 2006 NRL Premiers, the Brisbane Broncos travelled to England to face 2006 Super League champions, St Helens R.F.C. in the 2007 World Club Challenge. Civoniceva played as a prop forward in the Broncos' 14–18 loss against St Helens.

During the 2007 NRL season, at the Broncos' 20-year anniversary celebration, the club announced a list of the 20 best players to play for them to date which included Civoniceva.

In round 8 of NRL season 2007, Civoniceva played his 200th game for the Brisbane club, becoming only the eighth Broncos player to ever do so.

Civoniceva's Brisbane contract ended at the conclusion of the 2007 season. The Broncos decision to withdraw the contract to the prop was due to salary cap restrictions.

==== Penrith Panthers ====
Civoniceva signed to play for the Penrith Panthers for the 2008 season. The deal was for 2 years with an option for a third and was believed to be worth $370,000 a year. Civoniceva's move to New South Wales and another NRL team rather than relocating to England allowed him to continue to be available to represent both Australia and Queensland.

In January 2008, Penrith Panthers announced Civoniceva as captain of the team for 2008.

His deal with Penrith was set to expire at the end of the 2009 NRL season.

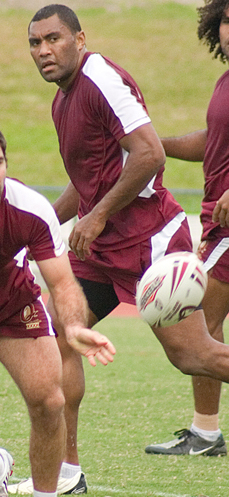
Civoniceva training with the Maroons in 2009

He re-signed with Penrith until the end of 2012.

He went on to play in Queensland's State of Origin victories in game 1 and then game 2, but suffered a season-ending foot injury in the first half of the second match. In the 2010 NRL Premiership, Civoniceva led the Panthers to second place on the ladder at the conclusion of the season, but in the penultimate round of the season he was sent off for a high tackle against the Bulldogs, which resulted in his suspension for two weeks.

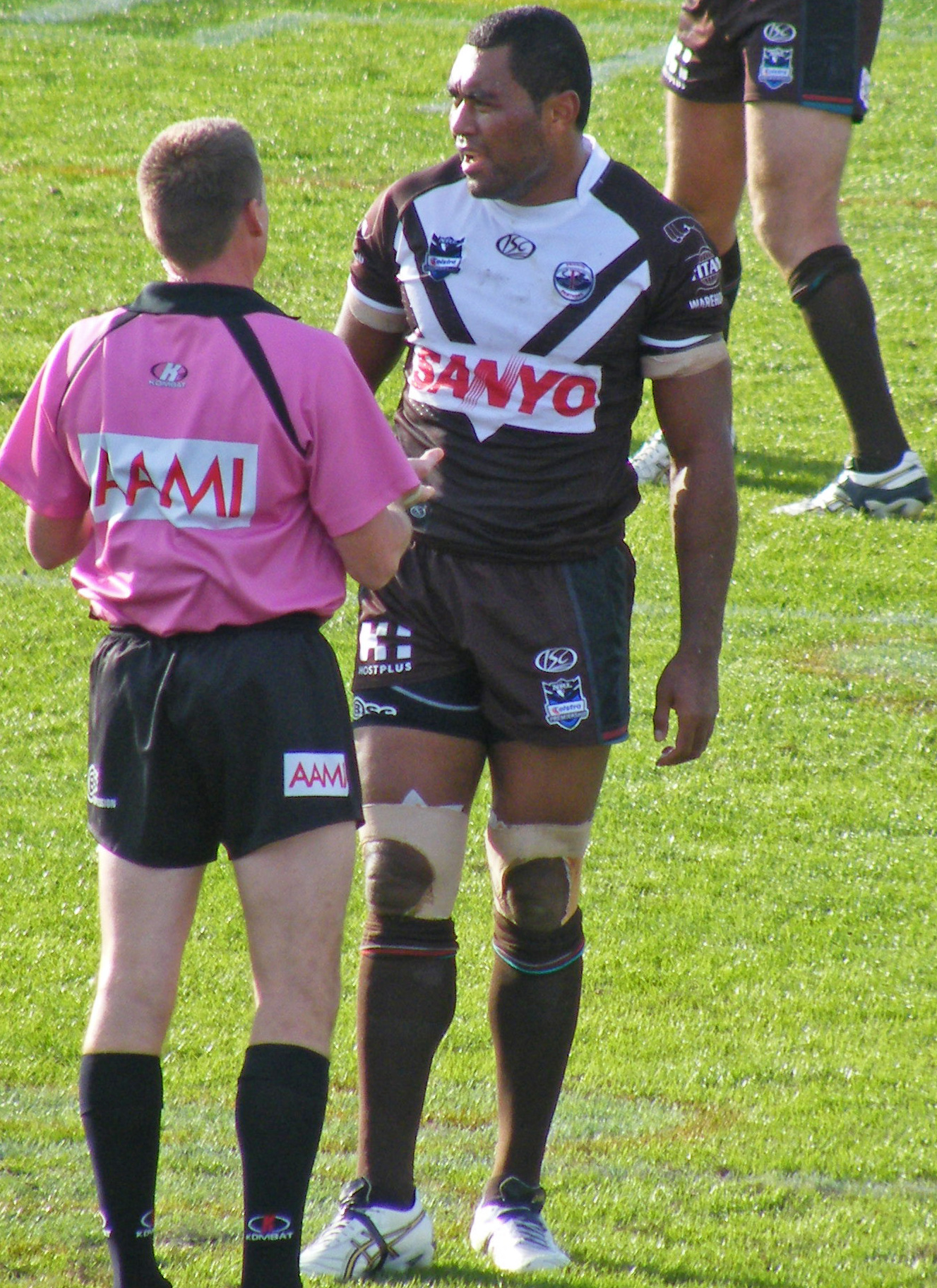
Civoniceva captaining the Penrith Panthers in 2010

As a result, he missed Penrith's first qualifying final, where, despite a brave effort, the Panthers lost by just two points against the Canberra Raiders.

In Round 5 of the 2011 NRL season, Civoniceva scored his first try since Round 8, 2008, against the Canberra Raiders in the 36–10 thrashing at Centrebet Stadium. He was one of the stars of Queensland's victory in Origin 1, 2011, running for more than 150 m and outperforming the NSW forwards.

Civoniceva scored his second try of the season in Round 16 against the North Queensland Cowboys, which was a 30–20 victory by the Panthers. The try involved a skilful left foot step from close range that left several Cowboys players, including Matthew Bowen, grasping at thin air. This was the Women in League round, and also the rookie coach, Steve Georgallis' first game as coach for the Penrith Panthers.

Civoniceva's stint at Penrith ended on a low, with the Panthers failing to qualify for the semi-finals, and thrashed by the St. George Illawarra Dragons, 32–12, at Round 26. Civoniceva also succumbed to a torn pectoral muscle injury during the 22nd minute of the game.

==== Return to Brisbane ====
On 26 July 2011, it was announced that the Penrith Panthers released Civoniceva from the final year of his contract, within the week, it was announced that he had signed to return to his original club, the Brisbane Broncos on a one-year deal.

On 8 May 2012, Civoniceva announced his retirement effective at the conclusion of the 2012 season.

Civoniceva was selected to play for Queensland in the 2012 State of Origin series.

During the 2012 NRL season Civoniceva became the 17th player in premiership history to play 300 games. The third and deciding match of the 2012 State of Origin series, a Maroons victory which sealed an unprecedented seventh consecutive series for Queensland, was Civoniceva's last. Played at Brisbane's Suncorp Stadium, it featured a post-match farewell speech for Civoniceva.

==== Redcliffe Dolphins ====
Civoniceva announced he would play for the Redcliffe Dolphins in the Queensland Cup during the 2013 season.

=== International career ===
His international and State of Origin debuts followed during 2001. At the end of the 2001 NRL season, he went on the 2001 Kangaroo tour.

Following the 2003 NRL season, Civoniceva played in the 2003 Kangaroo tour of Great Britain and France, helping Australia to victory over Great Britain in what would be the last time the two nations contested an Ashes series.

Civoniceva was selected in the Australian team to compete in the end of season 2004 Rugby League Tri-Nations tournament. In the final game against Great Britain he played prop forward in the Kangaroos' 44–4 victory.

Civoniceva was again selected to play for the Australia national team as a prop forward the 2007 ANZAC Test match victory against New Zealand.

In August 2008, Civoniceva was named in the preliminary 46-man Kangaroos squad for the 2008 Rugby League World Cup, and in October 2008 he was selected in the final 24-man Australia squad.

Civoniceva was selected for Australia in the one-off test match against New Zealand on 8 May 2009.

After sitting out the remainder of the NRL season, his next match was for Australia against New Zealand in the opening match of the 2009 Four Nations in London. By playing in the final, a victory against England, Civoniceva became the first forward in history to play forty internationals for Australia.

For the 2010 ANZAC Test, Civoniceva was selected to play for Australia as a prop forward in their victory against New Zealand.

At the end of 2013 he was selected to travel to the United Kingdom and represent Fiji, the country of his birth, in the 2013 Rugby League World Cup.

In May 2014, Petero played for Fiji in the 2014 Pacific Test. He was a late inclusion into the side, he wore the no.18 playing jersey.

Later on in the year, Petero became an assistant coach, assisting main coach Rick Stone.
