= Darren Lockyer =

Australian TV commentator and former rugby league footballer

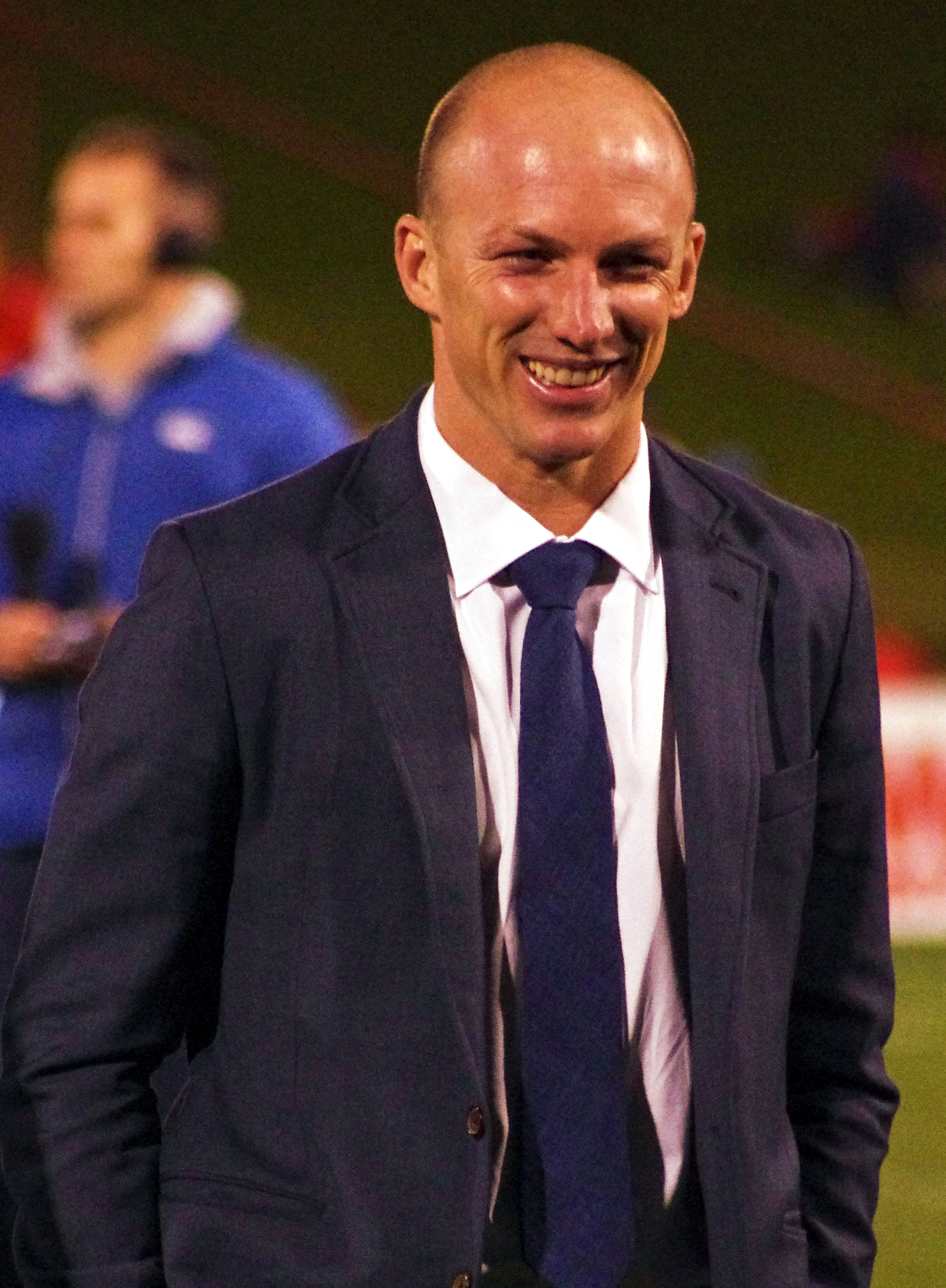

Personal information
- Full name: Darren James Lockyer
- Born: 24 March 1977 (age 49) Brisbane, Queensland, Australia

Playing information
- Height: 178 cm (5 ft 10 in)
- Weight: 85 kg (13 st 5 lb)
- Position: Five-eighth, Fullback
Club
Years	Team	Pld	T	G	FG	P
1995–11	Brisbane Broncos	355	122	341	21	1191
Representative
Years	Team	Pld	T	G	FG	P
1997	Queensland (SL)	2	0	1	0	2
1997	Australia (SL)	4	2	2	1	13
1998–11	Queensland	36	9	22	2	82
1998–11	Australia	59	35	31	2	204
2010–11	NRL All Stars	2	0	0	0	0

Darren James Lockyer (born 24 March 1977) is an Australian television commentator and former professional rugby league footballer. Lockyer was an Australian international and Queensland State representative captain, who played his entire professional career with the Brisbane Broncos. He is considered one of the greatest players of all time in two positions, fullback and five-eighth.

During his 16-year career he set appearance records for his club, state, and country, and also set additional all-time records for most National Rugby League appearances, most State of Origin appearances, most games as captain, and most tries for the Australian national team.

As a fullback, Lockyer won three grand finals and one as a five-eighth with the Broncos, a World Cup with Australia, and the Golden Boot Award for the world's best player. He was named in Queensland Rugby League's Team of the Century (1909–2008) at fullback. He switched positions to five-eighth in 2004 and went on to win a fourth grand final with the Broncos, a further five State of Origin series with Queensland, and a second Golden Boot Award.

== Background ==
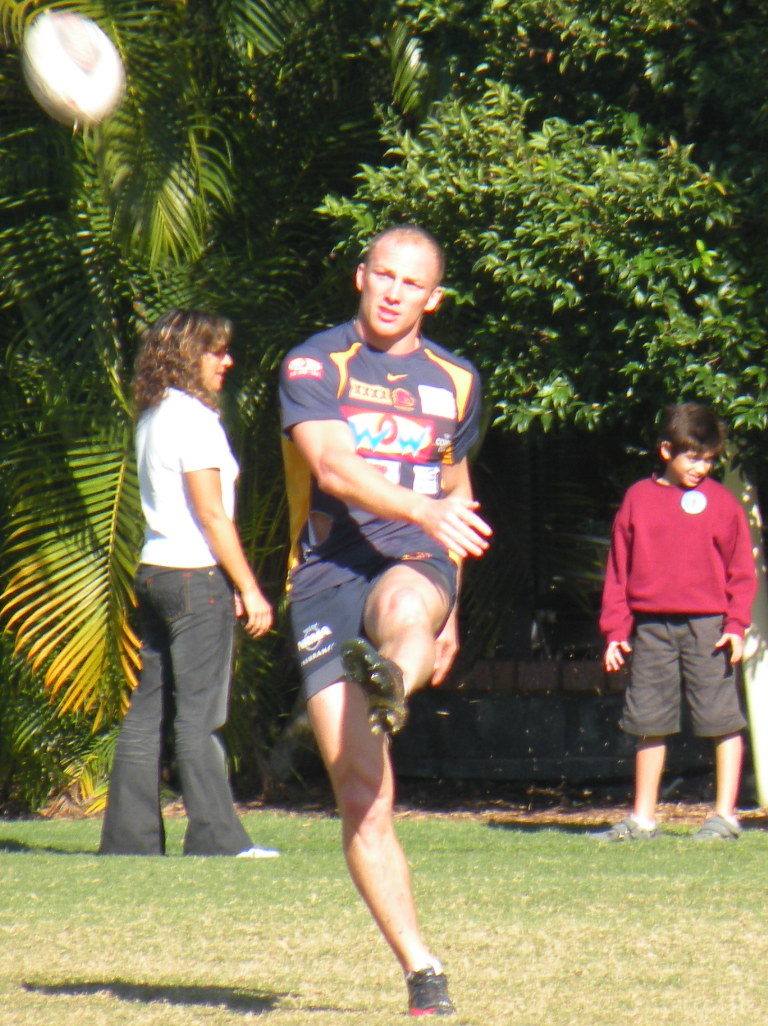
Lockyer training with the Brisbane Broncos

Lockyer was born in Brisbane, Queensland. His father, David, played Australian rules football for ten years in Brisbane with Morningside and introduced Darren to the game at four years of age.

Two years later, Lockyer started playing Aussie rules for Springwood, finishing runner-up in the best and fairest award in his first season. The following season he won the club's best and fairest award by 17 votes, despite having to travel 800 kilometres every weekend to play when the family moved to the small country town of Wandoan midway through the season. Travelling commitments and a lack of Australian rules football clubs around the Wandoan area forced him to quit the game and take up rugby league.

He played rugby league for school and club in Wandoan for four years before moving to Roma and playing for the Cities Gladiators. He made his first grade debut at 15 and played Five Eight for his Roma club. In 1990 Queensland Rugby League Development Officer, Glenn Bayliss, spotted the young Lockyer while visiting Roma. After returning to Toowoomba he passed on his views on to Brisbane Broncos talent scout Cyril Connell and Connell followed his progress over the next few years. In 1994, he traveled to Ipswich for a junior rugby league carnival where his performance caught the eye of coach Wayne Bennett. After impressing at the carnival, he moved to Brisbane and accepted a $2000 scholarship with the Broncos. In 2011, it was reported that former Parramatta player Steve Ella who was a scout for the club at the time had spoken with the Parramatta board stating that he had seen a young Lockyer at the carnival and that they should sign him. The Parramatta board reportedly knocked back Ella's suggestion. Lockyer later said in an interview that he did speak with Ella about moving to Parramatta saying "Steve Ella was the first guy to come and talk to my family. As a kid you knew the scouts who were watching and I remember the boys from Roma (where Lockyer grew up) would go to Sydney for trials. "It would have been a big move for me at that age and I was always keen to try my luck with the Broncos. It wasn't long after he (Ella) saw me that I got a scholarship with the Broncos and that's how it has played out". He also worked as a bartender at the Broncos Leagues Club to make ends meet. Later that year, he signed a $10,000 playing contract with the Broncos.

== Playing career ==
Lockyer made his professional first-grade debut with the Brisbane Broncos from the bench as an eighteen-year-old five-eighth in a 60–14 thrashing of the Parramatta Eels in Round 13 of the 1995 ARL season. In this game he threw a try assist to Steve Renouf, a combination which would blossom over the next few seasons. He went on to be named the 1995 Brisbane Broncos season's rookie of the year, playing 11 games at centre, five-eighth and off the bench, scoring 3 tries and kicking 4 goals in a game where primary goal kicker Julian O'Neill was injured. He also kicked the first field goal of his career to clinch a 27–20 win over the Gold Coast Seagulls in Round 21. Lockyer played most of the 1996 ARL season from the interchange bench, but also played fullback, wing, centre and five-eighth, finishing with 20 games played, scoring 7 tries and kicking 13 goals. Unfortunately for the Broncos, they had a rare period of failure, and despite finishing top 4 in both 1995 and 1996, they were unable to win a single finals game across those 2 years.

=== Fullback ===
==== 1997 ====
Lockyer was moved permanently to the fullback position by coach Wayne Bennett at the beginning of the 1997 Super League season, replacing Australian former international winger Willie Carne, who had played fullback for the Broncos in 1996, with Lockyer also taking over the full-time goal kicking duties from Carne.

He first gained representative honours for Queensland that season in the second Super League Tri-series match against New South Wales.

Lockyer's try-scoring and goal-kicking ability made him the top point-scorer of the 1997 Brisbane Broncos season, and he played a key role in the Broncos side which finished 1st in the Super League table, while also winning the World Club Challenge, the Final being a 36–12 win over the Hunter Mariners. Lockyer won his first finals match as Brisbane dismissed the Cronulla Sharks 34–2, before rematching the Sharks in the Grand Final where the Broncos won a much closer game 26–8. Lockyer kicked 10 goals from 13 attempts across those 2 matches, bringing his season tally to 8 tries and 70 goals.

At the end of the 1997 season Lockyer made his international debut when he was selected to play at fullback for Australia in all three games of the Super League Test series against Great Britain in England. He kicked two goals and one field goal during the series, which was won by Australia. Unfortunately, these matches do not count towards his official representative statistics as the IRLF refused to validate Super League internationals as test matches, even though the NRL recognises Super League matches as official first grade appearances.

==== 1998 ====
In the re-unified 1998 NRL season, Lockyer was selected as the Queensland team's fullback and goal-kicker for all three games of their successful 1998 State of Origin series, in which he was the top point-scorer.

Lockyer also made his debut for the Australian team against New Zealand, becoming Kangaroo No. 661. His debut game was shocking, making some poor mistakes which led to a 22–16 New Zealand win and the departure of long-time Australian coach Bob Fulton.

He was again top point-scorer for Brisbane that year, smashing the club record of 193 for most points in a season by scoring 272, coming from a career high 19 tries and 90 goals. By this time, Lockyer's playing style in attack was already being likened to that of a five-eighth. Despite the competition being unified and ARL powerhouses Newcastle Knights, Sydney City Roosters and Parramatta Eels as well as competition debutants Melbourne Storm having chances to dethrone them, Brisbane finished the season on top of the table, tied record wise with Newcastle but with a nearly 200 point advantage in point differential thanks to a host of big wins, 3 by more than 50 points, as well as a stoic defence which did not concede more than 28 points across both the regular season and finals. Brisbane came into the finals on a 12 game unbeaten streak (11 wins, 1 draw versus Balmain), but were stunned 15–10 against Parramatta in the Major Semi, thrusting them into sudden death football. Lockyer scored his first finals try in the loss, and continued his rich tryscoring form with another in a 30–6 win over Melbourne, before he scored a spectacular hat trick in a 46–18 win over the Roosters to help Brisbane secure second consecutive Grand Final berth. Lockyer started at fullback against the Canterbury Bulldogs, who had qualified despite finishing the regular season in 9th place, and helped the Broncos dismantle them 38–12 to secure the club's 4th premiership.

Due to his performance, he earned Dally M Fullback Of The Year honours for the first time.

Lockyer made his official State of Origin debut, playing all 3 games in Queensland's series victory.

And despite his shocking debut, Lockyer was retained in the Australian squad for their 2 end of season tests against New Zealand, scoring a try in both of Australia's victories.

==== 1999 ====
Lockyer's goal-kicking duties at the Broncos were shifted to teammates Ben Walker and Michael De Vere in 1999.

Lockyer was not selected in the first 2 Origin matches, but returned for the 3rd ahead of Robbie O'Davis, whose 22 game suspension the previous season was why Lockyer had been selected. Lockyer scored his first Origin try to help Queensland to a 10-all draw, which was enough for the Maroons to retain the shield. Those first 2 games were the last time where he was overlooked for Queensland, excluding games missed due to injury.

Lockyer featured in all 4 of Australia's matches in 1999, and was even sin-binned in the Kangaroos' win against the Kiwis in the final of the post-season 1999 Tri-nations tournament, having scored 2 tries to help them qualify for the match with a big win over Great Britain.

Despite Lockyer's individual performance, the year went terribly for the Broncos- the club was only able to salvage 1 win and a draw from their first 10 matches, a situation which worsened when club legend Allan Langer retired midseason. Brisbane sat 17th after 10 games, but 12 wins and a draw from their last 14 matches saw them scrape into the finals, a single point ahead of 9th placed Canberra. Brisbane were drawn the tough task of minor premiers Cronulla in the first week of the finals, and the Sharks gained revenge for 1997 with a 42–20 win to end the Broncos season.

==== 2000 ====
Lockyer played at fullback in all three matches of the 2000 State of Origin series in which Queensland suffered a 3–0 series whitewash by New South Wales.

At club level, the Broncos had returned to the top of the NRL thanks to Bennett's new gameplan, and Brisbane ran away with the minor premiership, winning 2 more games on top of 2 more draws than the 2nd placed Roosters, again having the best attack and best defence in the league. Brisbane reversed a 20–6 half time deficit to gain revenge on the Sharks with a 32–20 win, which saw them sent to a Preliminary final showdown against Parramatta, which they won 16–10. Brisbane met the Roosters in the Grand Final, where Lockyer won the Clive Churchill Medal as man of the match in their 14–6 victory.

Lockyer, having featured in Australia's 2–0 win over New Zealand and 82–0 battering of Papua New Guinea, Lockyer was selected in Australia's 2000 World Cup squad, playing 5 games including the 40–12 win over New Zealand in the Final. By this time Lockyer was being called the best fullback in the world.

Also in 2000 he received the Australian Sports Medal for his contribution to Australia's international standing in the sport of rugby league

==== 2001 ====
Darren pioneered the ball-playing fullback, the No. 1 who can play like a second or third five-eighth.

— Tim Sheens

Having won the 2000 NRL Premiership, the Broncos traveled to England to play against 2000's Super League V champions, St Helens, for the 2001 World Club Challenge, with Lockyer playing at fullback in Brisbane's loss.

In March 2001, Lockyer was approached by the Australian Football League club Essendon regarding an unprecedented switch of codes, and was offered a contract subsequent to a successful trial. However Lockyer chose to stay committed to rugby league.

Later in 2001, following Queensland captain Gorden Tallis' season-ending neck injury before the second game of the 2001 State of Origin series, the Maroons' captaincy was handed to Lockyer. In the third and deciding game of the series, Lockyer was named man-of-the-match, having scored two tries and kicked four goals to help Queensland to victory. Lockyer's heroic game 3 performance, however, has been overshadowed by the return to State of Origin from Queensland legend Langer after an SOS from coach Bennett. Despite the lack of media coverage, Lockyer was still awarded the Ron McAuliffe Medal as Queensland player of the series.

Brisbane started off the 2001 season in the same form they ended 2000, and sat 2nd on the ladder after 19 rounds. But a late season collapse, losing 6 straight to limp into the finals in 5th position. Lockyer was one of Brisbane's best, even during the losing streak, but couldn't prevent a 22–6 loss to Cronulla in the qualifying final. They bounced back against the St George Illawarra Dragons to the tune of 44–28, a game which set the record for highest scoring match in NRL Finals history, before their season came to an end with a 24–16 loss to the minor premiers Parramatta.

Lockyer walked away with a bevy of awards for his performances, including Dally M Fullback Of The Year and Dally M Representative Player Of The Year.

At the end of the season, Lockyer went on the 2001 Kangaroo tour of Great Britain. He played at fullback in all three Ashes tests, scoring tries in the last two.

==== 2002 ====
Lockyer was Queensland's fullback in all three games of their successful 2002 State of Origin series, playing a key role in the drawn series.

Brisbane spent almost the entire 2002 season in the Top 4, finishing in 3rd place, as Lockyer, along with Lote Tuquiri and Chris Walker, led the team in tryscoring. Brisbane advanced straight to a preliminary final after a 24–14 win over the Eels in the second qualifying final, but a Lockyer try could not prevent them from falling 16–12 to the eventual premiers, the Roosters, in the preliminary final.

Lockyer did, however, win his 3rd and final Dally M Fullback Of The Year award.

Lockyer played in all 3 of Australia's end of season tests, scoring 2 tries in Australia's 64–10 flogging of Great Britain.

==== 2003 ====
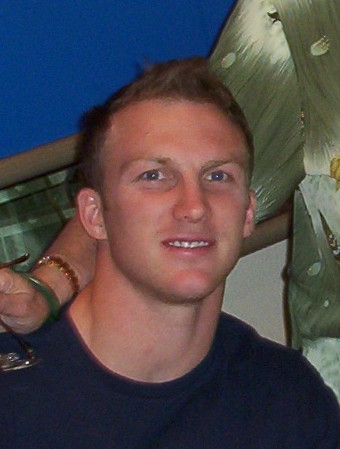
Lockyer at the Sheraton, Brisbane in 2003

Lockyer was Queensland's fullback for all three games of their unsuccessful 2003 State of Origin series, scoring a try in the 25–12 Game 1 loss.

He was named the 2003 Brisbane Broncos season's best player, as Brisbane endured a 7 game losing streak which saw them slip from 1st to 8th, coinciding with Lockyer missing 4 games, and a 28–18 loss to the eventual premiers, the Penrith Panthers in the qualifying final, ending their season.

At the end of the 2003 NRL season, the retirement of Australian national captain, Gorden Tallis, from representative football meant that the Kangaroos captaincy was handed to Lockyer shortly before the 2003 Kangaroo tour of Great Britain and France. Lockyer led Australia to victory over Great Britain in what would be the last time rugby league's Ashes series was contested until a projected tour in 2021.

In addition he won the first of his Rugby League World Golden Boot Awards for the best international rugby league player that year. He also picked up his 2nd Ron McAuliffe Medal.

=== Five-eighth ===
==== 2004 ====
For the 2004 Brisbane Broncos season, after the retirement of Ben Ikin, coach Wayne Bennett moved Lockyer, then established as the world's best fullback, to the five-eighth position where he would get more opportunities with the ball in hand.

The Broncos fullback position he left vacated was taken by 17-year-old Karmichael Hunt. Lockyer gained some negative media attention at the start of the 2004 NRL season when he made a careless joke about the Bulldogs' gang rape allegation at a Queensland sports function. Being the Australian captain, Lockyer was rebuked by national officials and quickly apologised for the comment.

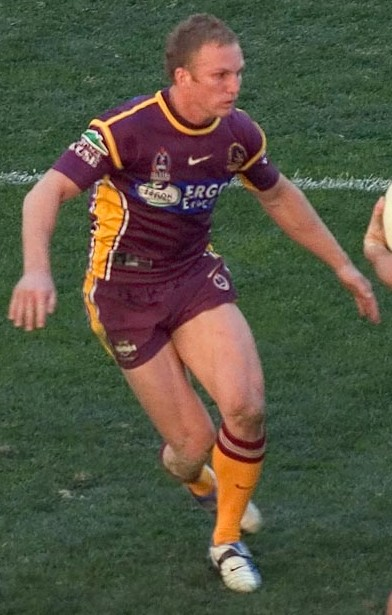
Lockyer playing for the Broncos in 2004, his first year at five-eighth.

The world's greatest fullback is now the world's greatest five-eighth.

— Phil Gould, 11 April 2004

Despite Lockyer's lack of experience as a five-eighth, he was picked in the position for Queensland (for the final 2 games of the series, after missing Game 1 through injury) and Australia, and remained as captain of both teams.

Brisbane again had a great regular season, finishing 3rd, but a 31–14 loss to Melbourne and former assistant coach Craig Bellamy in the qualifying final thrust them into sudden death footy once again. They were drawn to take on Queensland rivals North Queensland Cowboys, a team Brisbane had never lost to. As a positive gesture, Brisbane volunteered to move the home final to the Cowboys' Dairy Farmers Stadium, however the 25,000 Cowboys fans in attendance pushed the Townsville side to a stunning 10–0 upset over the Broncos, in what would be Tallis' last career game.

Lockyer collected a host of awards in his first season as five-eighth, including Dally M Five-Eighth Of The Year, the Provan Summons Medal, and the RLIF Back Of The Year for his work in Australia's dominant Tri Nations success.

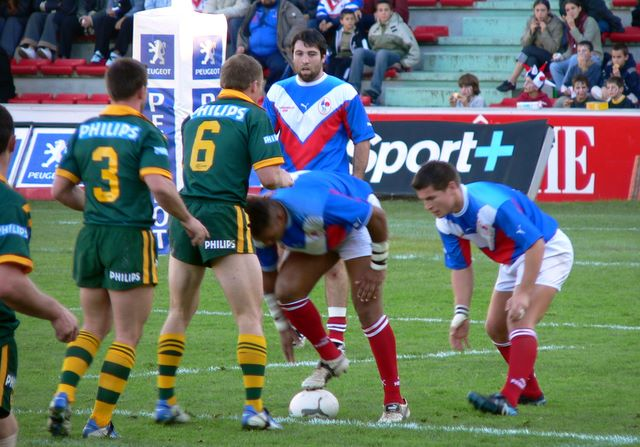
Lockyer wearing the 6 jersey at marker for the Kangaroos in 2004

In the final against Great Britain he scored a try and kicked six goals in their 44–4 victory. Also in 2004, during a game for the Broncos, Lockyer took a hit to the throat which caused damage to a small bone in his larynx. This has resulted in his unusually husky-sounding voice, which could be corrected with surgery that Lockyer has so far declined to undergo.

==== 2005 ====
With Gorden Tallis' retirement at the end of the 2004 season, the Broncos' captaincy was passed onto Lockyer in 2005.

He also captained Australia at five-eighth in the 2005 ANZAC Test, scoring two tries.

Lockyer then captained Queensland at five-eighth in all three games of their unsuccessful 2005 State of Origin series.

In 2005 Lockyer was also the Broncos' top point-scorer as they led the comp for a majority of the season, only for 2 losses at the end of the season consigning them to a 3rd place finish. Brisbane would again lose to Melbourne in the qualifying final, this time a 24–18 loss, before losing to the eventual premiers Wests Tigers 34–6 to end a great season on a very disappointing note. However, experienced commentators continued questioning Lockyer's value as a five-eighth during representative matches.

He traveled with the Australian national team to Europe for the 2005 Tri-Nations, but injured his foot at training and missed the last few games of the tournament, including Australia's stunning 24–0 loss to New Zealand in the final.

==== 2006 ====
After a poor start to the 2006 season following a 36–4 loss to the North Queensland Cowboys at Suncorp Stadium in Round 1, several critics argued that Lockyer should either return to fullback or lose his spot on both the Australian and Queensland squads.

There were also rumours that Johnathan Thurston would be chosen as the Queensland five-eighth, with Scott Prince at halfback. However, after the ANZAC Test, in which Lockyer scored two tries in Australia's 50–12 defeat of New Zealand, the critics eased off. Lockyer's performances in the five-eighth position improved greatly in the weeks leading up to the 2006 State of Origin series, resulting in his selection as five-eighth and captain for Game I. Lockyer underwent further criticism when the Maroons lost to the Blues 17–16 after a poor first half. His position was again debated, with new Queensland coach Mal Meninga at one point telling Lockyer he wanted to pick him at fullback for Game 2 (to which Lockyer responded with "pick me at five-eighth, or don't pick me at all"), but strong performances against the Bulldogs and the Warriors resulted in his retention in the Queensland side. Queensland then made an impressive comeback in Origin 2, thumping the Blues 30–6, with Lockyer receiving the Man of the Match award. He was then responsible for sealing the series victory for Queensland in the deciding match. With Queensland down 14–10 with 5 minutes remaining, Lockyer intercepted a pass from NSW player Brett Hodgson and scored the match-winning try. It was Queensland's first outright series victory since 2001 and also stopped New South Wales from achieving their 4th consecutive Origin series win. After the match, Lockyer received the Wally Lewis Medal for player of the series, and also received his third Ron McAuliffe Medal.

...can't play five-eighth, shouldn't be captain of Queensland – the list just goes on. Now you all want to applaud him. Thank God for him that he doesn't lose confidence and he is the champion he is.

— Brisbane coach Wayne Bennett at a press conference following the 2006 NRL Grand Final.

Immediately after Queensland's State of Origin success, the Broncos entered a 5-game losing streak, in what Bennett referred to as the "slump that wasn't a slump", but bounced back to comfortably win their final three premiership games of the season. Despite losing to the St George Illawarra Dragons in the first week of the finals, the Broncos rebounded to defeat the Newcastle Knights 50–6. They then won the preliminary final against the Bulldogs 37–20 after trailing 20–6 at half-time, with Lockyer named man of the match.

He then steered his team to win the 2006 NRL Grand Final 15–8 over Melbourne, setting up both tries and then kicking a winning field goal in the 73rd minute.

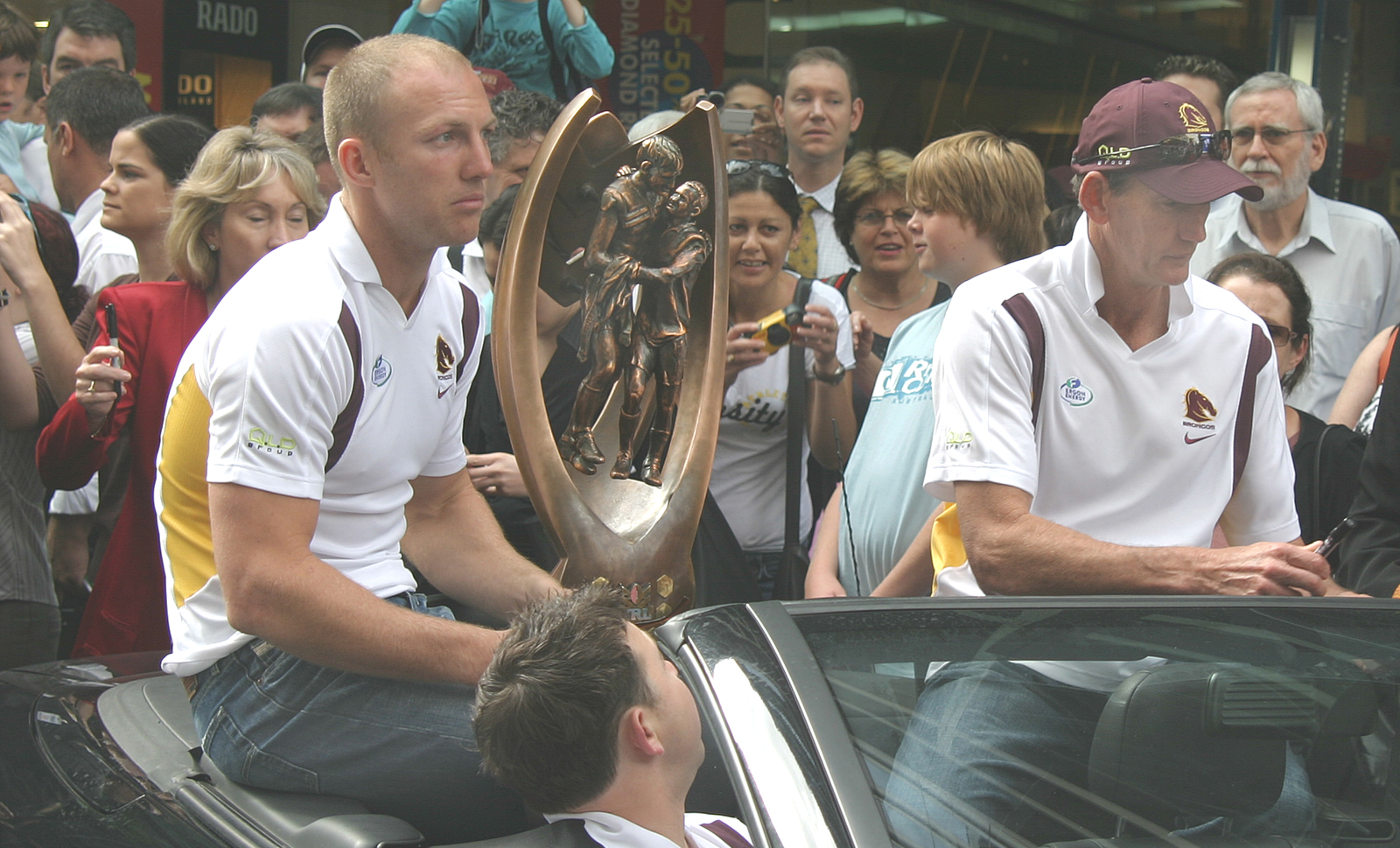
Lockyer and Wayne Bennett in October 2006

This was Lockyer's fourth premiership (and only one as captain), and the Broncos' sixth. Lockyer was also the Broncos' top try-scorer (together with Tame Tupou) for the 2006 season.

For his efforts in 2006, Lockyer received his second Dally M Five-Eighth Of The Year and his second Dally M Representative Player Of The Year.

Lockyer then captained the Kangaroos to an extra-time victory in the 2006 Tri-nations Final against New Zealand, scoring the match-winning try in Australia's 16–12 victory. In the process, he became the top try-scorer in Tri-Nations history with a tally of 9 tries.

In the week leading up to the final, Lockyer was named the Golden Boot Award-winner for international player of the year for the second time. Lockyer was also named Dally M five-eighth and representative player of the year, the Broncos' best back, and people's choice player of the year, as well as being a finalist in the Queensland Sports Star of the Year award. 2006 was arguably Lockyer's finest ever season, as he'd become the first person since Allan Langer (a former teammate) to captain winning teams in the National Rugby League premiership, the State of Origin series, and the Tri-Nations series all in the same year.

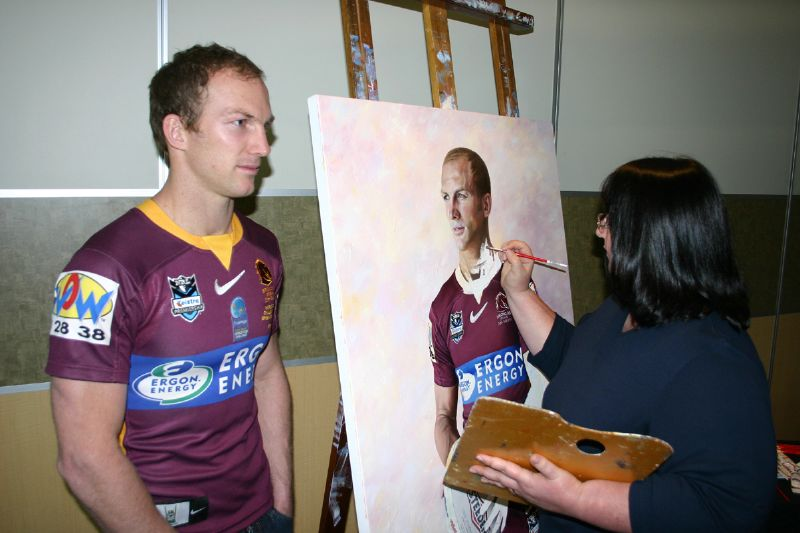
Lockyer having his portrait painted in 2007.

==== 2007 ====
Prior to the NRL season the Broncos, under Lockyer, lost the 2007 World Club Challenge to St Helens. This remains the only major trophy to have eluded him (notwithstanding the Broncos' victory in the Super League World Club Championship tournament of 1997).

In round 1 of the 2007 NRL season, Lockyer injured his right ankle and was initially ruled out for 6 weeks. However, a fortnight later in Round 3, he made a surprise comeback for the Broncos against the Penrith Panthers. Lockyer captained the Australian national team from five-eighth in the 2007 ANZAC Test match against New Zealand, scoring a try in the Kangaroos' 30–6 victory.

During the season at the Broncos' 20-year anniversary celebration, the club announced a list of the 20 best players to play for them to date which included Lockyer.

Lockyer injured his ankle again in Round 9 against the Sharks, but he recovered in time to play in Game I of the 2007 State of Origin series and defeat the New South Wales Blues. Lockyer would captain the Maroons in all 3 games as they won their second straight Origin title.

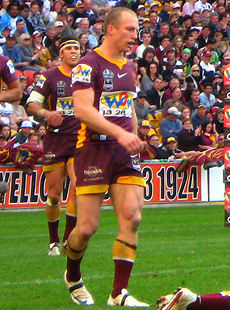
Lockyer playing against the Canberra Raiders in 2008

In the Round 18 match against North Queensland, Lockyer ruptured his anterior cruciate ligament, with the severity of the injury forcing him out for the rest of the 2007 season. Without him, Brisbane crumbled from 5th to 8th and fell 40–0 to eventual Grand Final winners Melbourne in the qualifying final.

Lockyer would still, however, be named Dally M Five-Eighth Of The Year a third time, his second consecutive honour, all 3 coming in a 4 year period. Despite Lockyer was at the time contracted to the Broncos until the end of 2009 when he admitted that he was interested in playing in the Super League after watching the 2007 Challenge Cup Final at Wembley Stadium, London.

On 27 October 2007, Lockyer married Loren Pollock, his girlfriend of three years, coincidentally on the same day his immediate predecessor as Australian Test captain, Andrew Johns also tied the knot.

==== 2008 ====
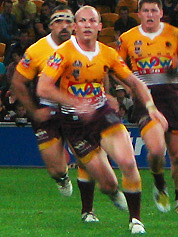
Lockyer playing against the Newcastle Knights in 2008

Lockyer's knee injury was worse than first thought- his decision to play on after the initial ACL rupture resulted in his knee cartilage being damaged, forcing extra surgeries which saw him racing against the clock to start the 2008 NRL season. Ultimately he would line up in a Round 1 win over the Panthers, however the issue lingered, and he missed 6 of Brisbane's first 11 games. Lockyer, eager to tie down an Origin spot, returned in a round 12 clash against the Eels, where he played an instrumental role in Brisbane's last gasp 30–26 win, however another knee injury would see him miss 5 weeks of action- and the entire Origin series. Lockyer returned to full health after Round 18 and helped Brisbane secure 5th on the ladder, and a 24–16 win over Sydney in the qualifying final gave hope that the Lockyer-inspired run of form would continue through September. That hope was renewed when Brisbane led minor premiers Melbourne 14–12 in the dying stages of the Semi-final, only for a late Greg Inglis try to end Brisbane's season- and leave Lockyer showing a rare display of emotion behind the goal line.

In August 2008, Lockyer was named in the preliminary 46-man Kangaroos squad for the 2008 World Cup, and in October 2008 he was selected in the final 24-man Australia squad. He was named Australian captain and was considered one of the 2008 World Cup 'Players to Watch' by NRL Live.

Lockyer scored two tries and was awarded the player of the match medal in the losing effort against the Kiwis at the World Cup final.

==== 2009 ====
In Round 8, Lockyer played his 300th first grade game, although the occasion was soured by a 28–12 loss to Newcastle during which a section of EnergyAustralia Stadium was left without power at half time.

Returning to the Queensland side after a 1 year absence, Lockyer resumed his role as captain and led the Maroons to a record 4th consecutive series victory. Lockyer sustained a knee injury in the dead-rubber Game 3, which sidelined him for a week.

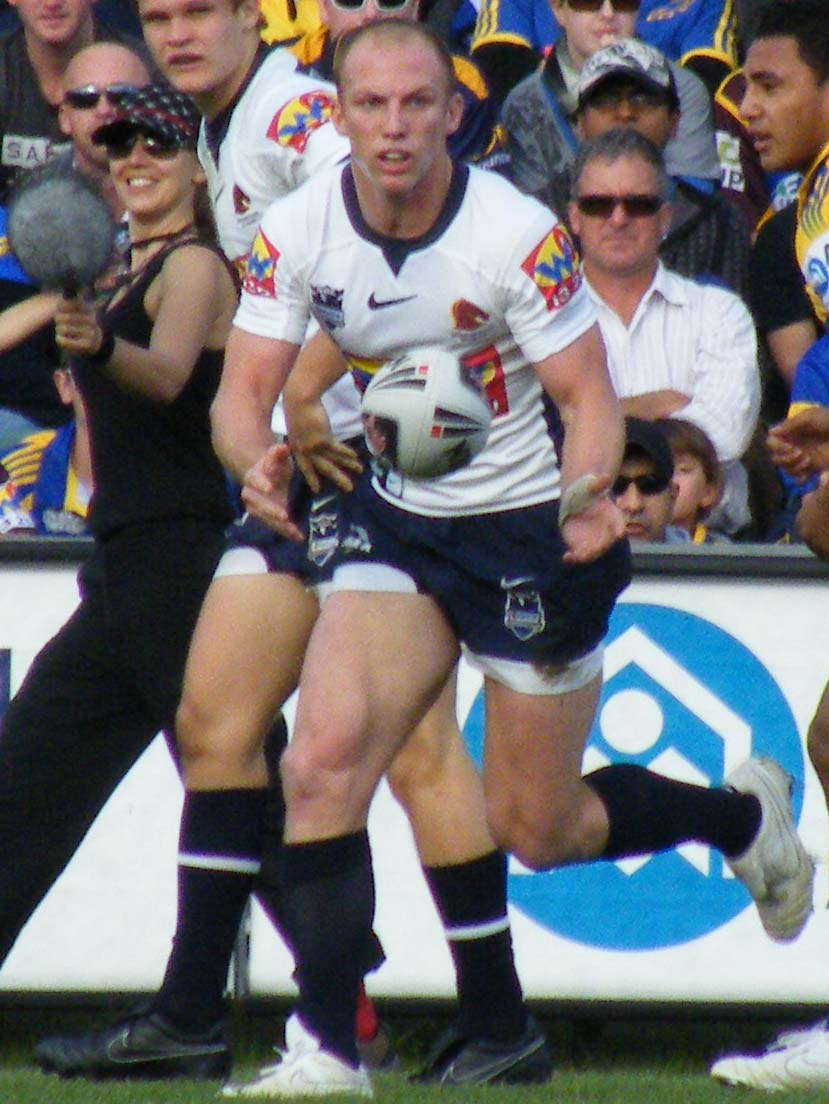
Lockyer playing against the Parramatta Eels in 2009

In that time, Brisbane had fallen to 10th on the ladder, but after a then-club record 56–0 drubbing against Canberra in his first game back, Brisbane won 5 straight matches to finish 6th in Ivan Henjak's first year as head coach- and Brisbane's first season coached by someone other than Wayne Bennett, after the supercoach left for the Dragons. Brisbane beat the Titans 40–32 in the qualifying final, tying the record for highest scoring final that they had set in 2001, and set up a semi final showdown with Bennet's Dragons at Suncorp Stadium.

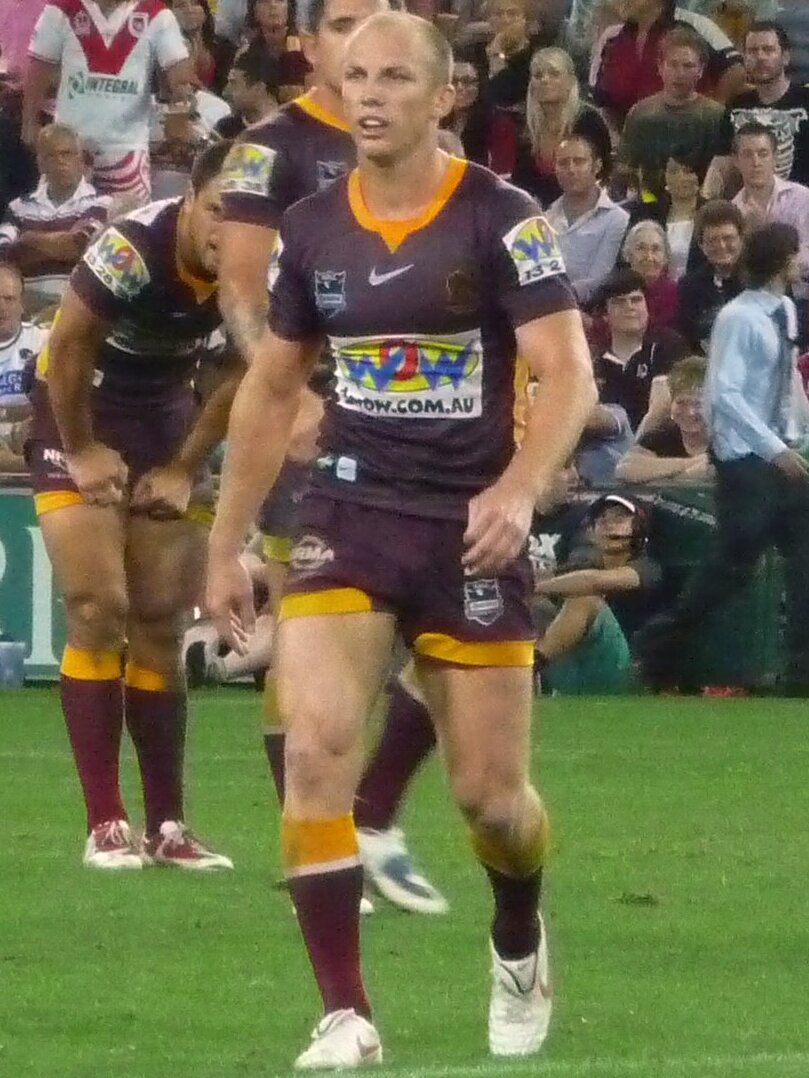
Lockyer playing against the St George Illawarra Dragons in 2009 Semi-Final

Brisbane dominated the minor premiers and advanced to the Preliminary Final with a 24–10 win, but the result was soured by a fractured ankle suffered by Lockyer's halves partner Peter Wallace. The only other halfback on Brisbane's roster was Ben Hunt, who at the time had played just 2 first grade games. They named rookie utility Alex Glenn at halfback, only to move veteran back rower Tonie Carroll into the halves at the last minute. Ultimately, they were probably doomed no matter what they did, as Melbourne ended their season for the third year in a row with a 40–10 rout.

During the 2009 Four Nations tournament, in which Lockyer captained Australia to victory, he also broke records for most-capped Australian player and most games for Australia as captain.

==== 2010 ====
Around the start of the 2010 NRL season, there was massive media speculation about whether Lockyer would retire from representative football. He opted to continue making himself available to selectors and continued captaining the Kangaroos, taking Lockyer in 2010, captained Queensland to their record-breaking fifth straight series win. In the series sealing victory in Game II, Lockyer was named Man of the Match. This series highlighted how Lockyer over time; has become more and more effective and comfortable in his game-dominating five-eighth role, despite losing much of his renowned athleticism after his 2007 knee injury.

In round 16 Lockyer played his 329th game for the Broncos, breaking Andrew Ettingshausen's record for most games played at a single club. Lockyer suffered a rib injury three weeks out from the finals series with the Broncos teetering in 8th place. Brisbane went on to miss the 8 (finishing 10th) for the first time in 18 years, Lockyer's injury was the main factor in this as he did not play a single game after it and Brisbane failed to win another game.

During the end of season 2010 Four Nations tournament, Lockyer broke the Australian national team's all-time try scoring record of 33 set by Ken Irvine, scoring his 34th against Papua New Guinea in Australia's opening match. He was however, unable to secure the trophy for Australia, with New Zealand coming out victors in their third consecutive final of a major tournament against the Kangaroos.

==== 2011 ====
"Wally Lewis was a magnificent player at Origin level but Locky has gone past The King for mine. He's already gone ahead of Andrew Johns, don't worry about that.

— Former New South Wales State of Origin captain and coach Tommy Raudonikis, 3 May 2011

After performing well at Broncos pre-season training in January, Lockyer declared himself available for the full representative football calendar of 2011.

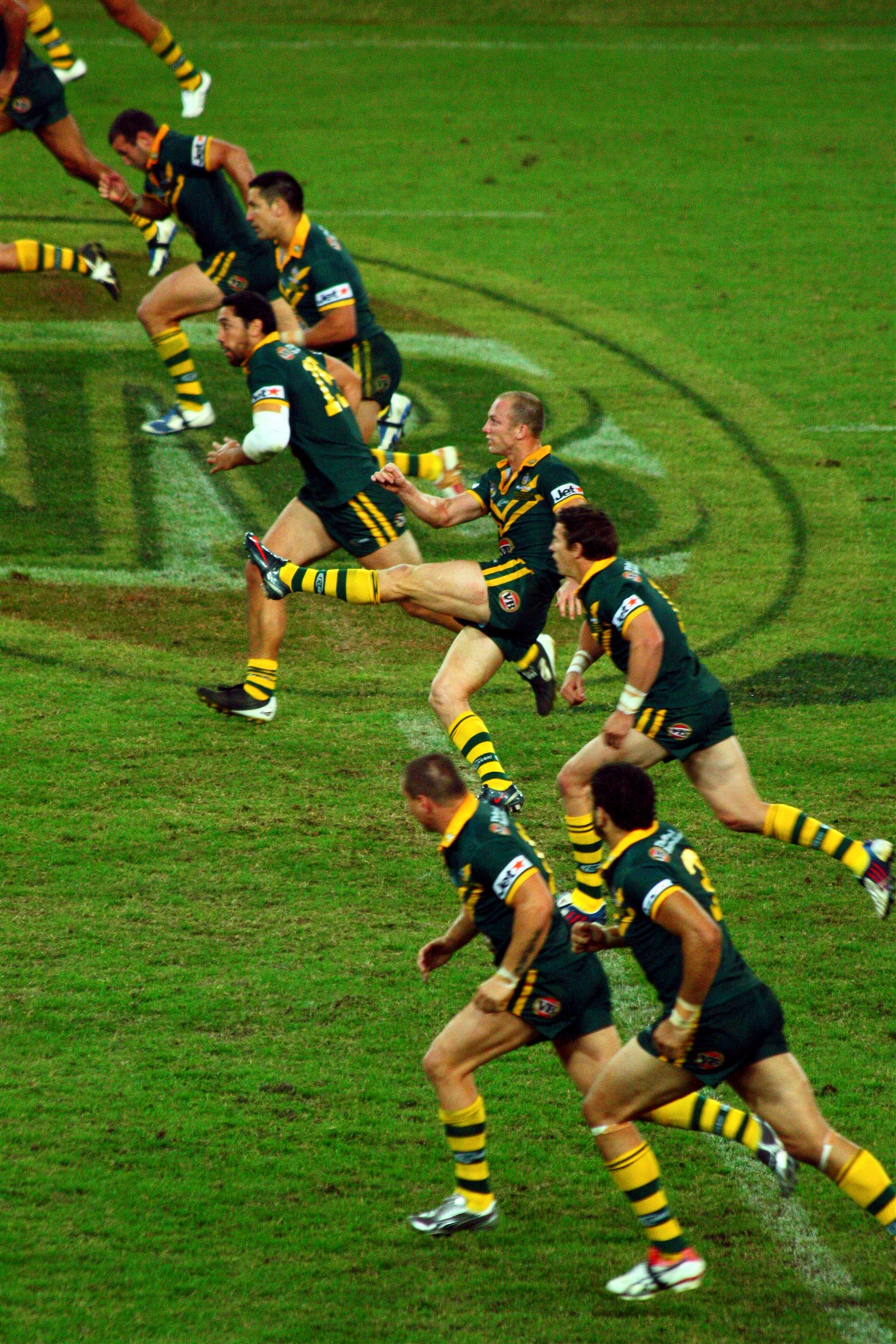
Lockyer kicking off for the Kangaroos in 2009

On 28 March 2011, Lockyer announced his retirement stating that the 2011 season will be his final year in the National Rugby League after deciding not to go to the Super League with the promoted Widnes Vikings.

On 1 May, Lockyer was named captain in the 17-man squad for the annual ANZAC Test Match in his usual position of five-eighth. Lockyer finished his final ANZAC Test match on a good note, leading the Kangaroos to a 20–10 victory, equalling Ruben Wiki's record of 55 Test games at Test level, having a big hand in setting up two tries the first for Billy Slater with a bomb, the second with a pop-pass play to Paul Gallen, ending in the hands of test-debutant and Broncos teammate Jharal Yow Yeh.

Lockyer was selected in Game I of the 2011 State of Origin series at five-eighth and as captain, making 34th appearance for Queensland, equalling the all-time record of Allan Langer. Lockyer set up and made the final pass for Billy Slater's match winning try. Darren was selected for the following two games, Game 2, a loss, however led the Maroons to a nail-biting decider win of 34–24; ending his prolific Origin career on a high, with 6-straight series wins and a memorable speech.

In Round 22, on 7 August, Lockyer played his all-time record-equalling 349th club game against the New Zealand Warriors at home, Suncorp Stadium. Brisbane won the game 21–20 thanks to a field goal slotted in by halfback Wallace. The following Friday, on 12 August, Lockyer officially broke the record for most NRL games played at 350 with a win over the North Queensland Cowboys in front of a capacity crowd Dairy Farmers Stadium.

The NRL's CEO David Gallop presented Lockyer with the match ball afterwards.

In the second week of the finals series, Lockyer and the Broncos came up against his former mentor Bennett in a match billed as a farewell for one of the two champions. Lockyer was responsible for putting Ben Teo in for the first try, but with Brisbane up 12–6 and under 10 minutes remaining, Lockyer came too close to a jumping Gerard Beale and collected the knee of the Broncos winger to the face, fracturing his cheekbone. Lockyer played through the pain, but missed a tackle which helped set up a game tying Dragons try through Brett Morris. With the game sent to Golden Point, Lockyer, in what would eventually be the last act of his career, sealed the match for the Broncos with a 30m field goal in the 82nd minute. Lockyer underwent surgery to repair the cheekbone and tried everything to ensure he played the Preliminary Final- even flying from Brisbane to Sydney by helicopter so he could stay at a low altitude. But ultimately, he was forced to pull out from the squad, and watched from the sidelines as Brisbane fell 26–14 to Manly – a team Lockyer had helped Brisbane beat just a month earlier – resulting in the end of his legendary career. He was named the 2011 Brisbane Broncos season's player of the year.

On 16 October 2011, he captained Australia to a 42–6 win against New Zealand in his last Test game in Australia at Newcastle's Hunter Stadium. Lockyer ended his career captaining the Australian national team to victory in the 2011 Four Nations. His last match was the Four Nations final at Elland Road against England; he scored a try with the last play of the match, and his final touch was a rather embarrassing one- an unsuccessful conversion attempt from in front of the posts.

=== Honours and career highlights ===
In February 2008, Lockyer was named in a list of Australia's 100 Greatest Players (1908–2007) which was commissioned by the NRL and ARL tocelebrate the code's centenary year in Australia, the only current player to make the list.

In June 2008, he was chosen in the Queensland Rugby League's Team of the Century at fullback.

In 2008, rugby league in Australia's centenary year, Lockyer was named at fullback in the Toowoomba and South West Team of the Century.

In 2011 part of the Warrego Highway between Ipswich and Toowoomba was renamed Darren Lockyer Way in his honour. Also, the Queensland State Government agreed to sculpting a life size bronze statue of Darren Lockyer in honour of his achievements in Queensland Rugby League which since 2012 has been standing next to 'The King', Wally Lewis outside Lang Park.

In 2012 the "Darren Lockyer Limited Edition 6YO Release" was sold by Bundaberg Rum to celebrate his career.

In October 2018, he was inducted into the Sport Australia Hall of Fame.

==== Brisbane Broncos ====
- 3x Dally M. Medal Fullback of the Year: 1998, 2001, 2002
- 3x Dally M. Medal Five-Eighth of the Year: 2004, 2006, 2007
- 2x Dally M. Medal Representative Player of the Year: 2001, 2006

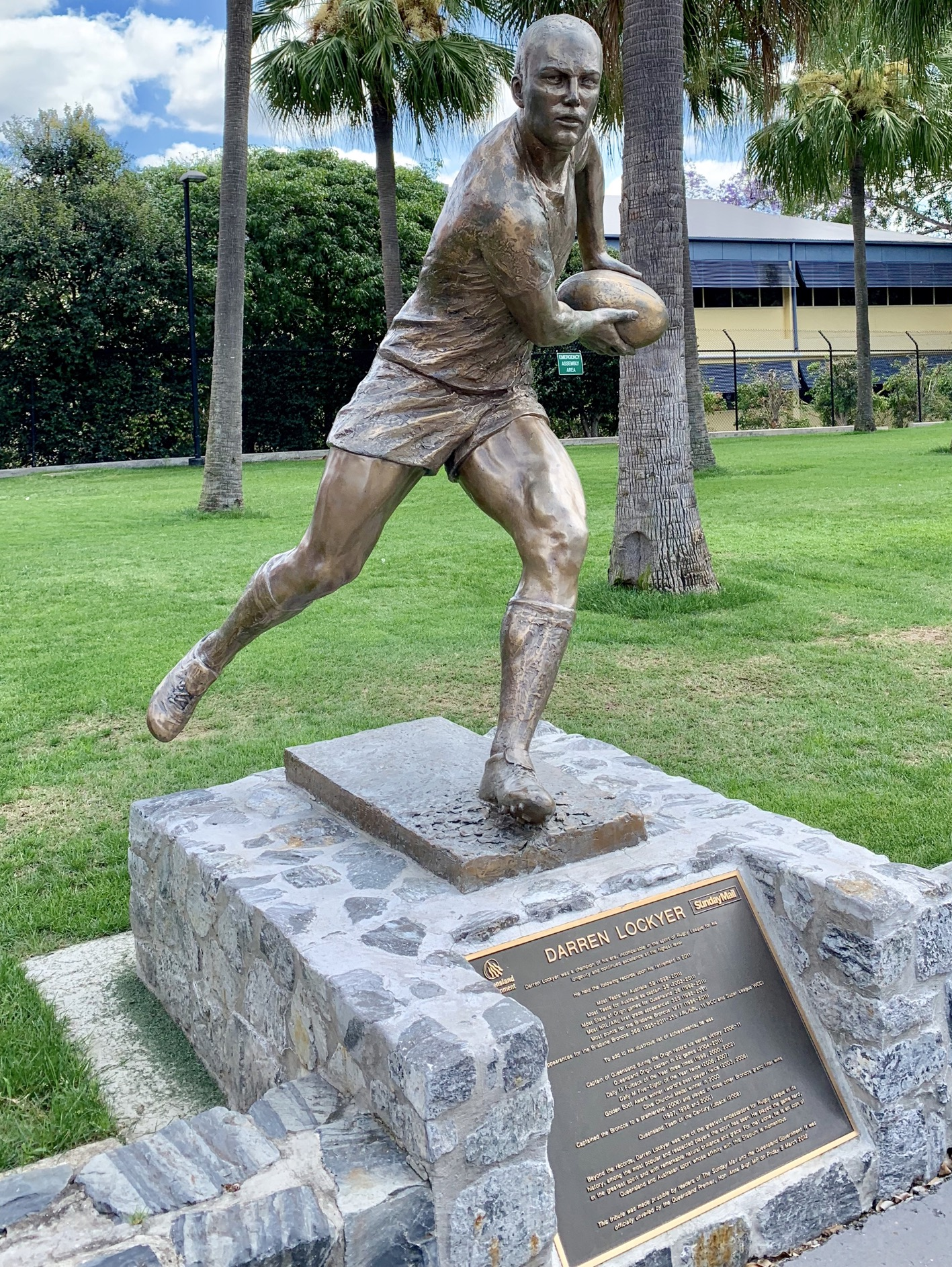
Lockyer statue at Lang Park

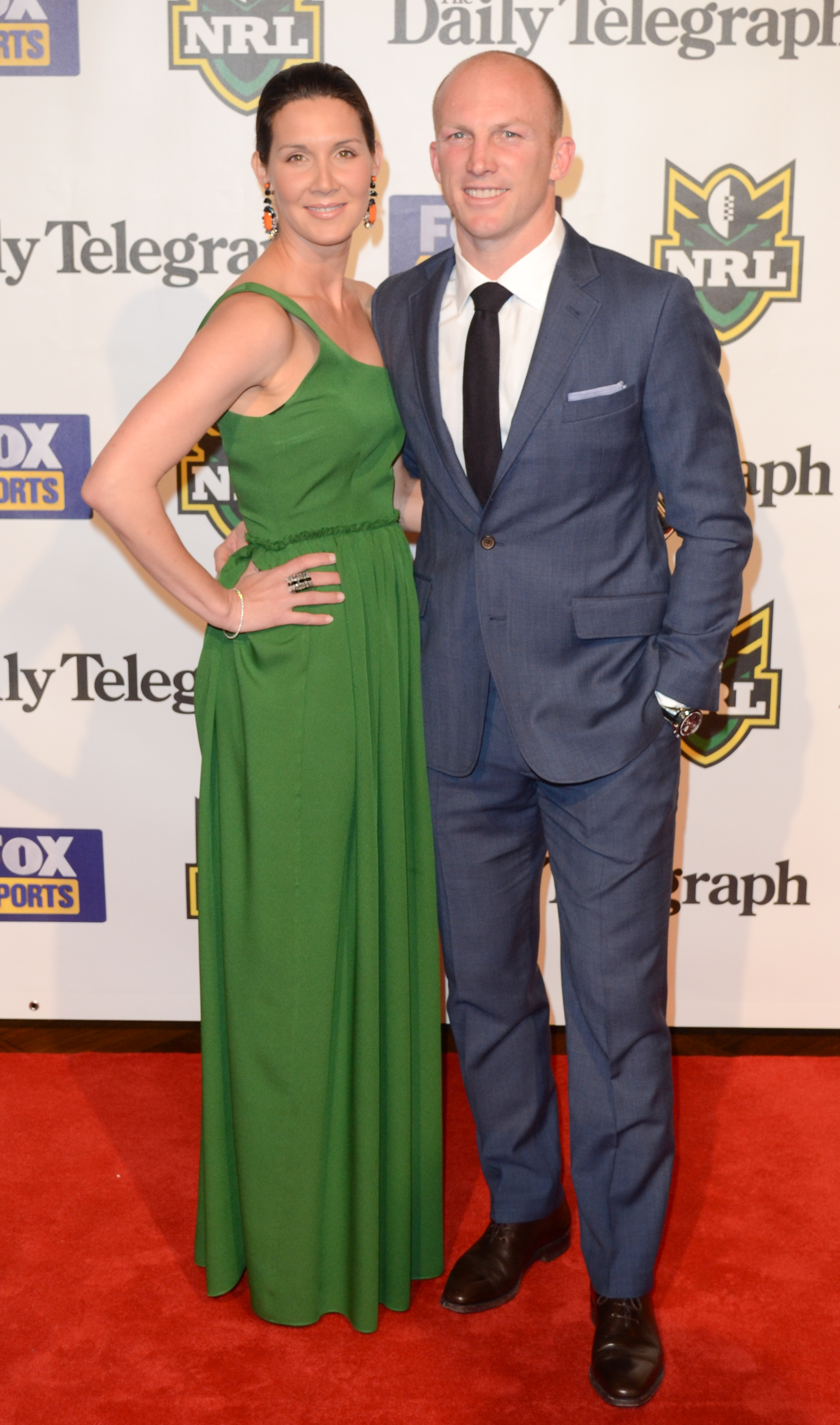
Lockyer with his wife Loren at the 2012 Dally M's

- Clive Churchill Medal Winner 2000
- First Grade Debut v Eels Round 13, 1995 (Broncos won 60–14).
- Club Rookie of the Year 1995
- Member of the 1997 Super League World Club Challenge winning Broncos side (Broncos defeated Hunter Mariners 36–12).
- Member of the 3rd Broncos Premiership Winning Team in 1997 (Broncos defeated Sharks 26–8, Lockyer scored 5 goals; 10 points).
- Most points in one season: 272 in 1998
- Member of the 4th Broncos Premiership Winning Team in 1998 (Broncos defeated Bulldogs 38–12, Lockyer scored 5 goals; 10 points).
- Member of the 5th Broncos Premiership Winning Team in 2000 (Broncos defeated Roosters 14–6)
- Club Player of the Year 2002, 2003 and 2011
- Changed Position from Fullback to Five-Eighth at start of 2004 at request of Wayne Bennett
- Captain 2005–2011
- Highest Ever Brisbane Point-Scorer with 1,220 Club Points (as of End of 2007 Season)
- Club Best Back Award 2001, 2002, 2003, 2006
- Member of the 6th Broncos Premiership Winning Team in 2006 and also Captain (Broncos defeated Storm 15–8, Lockyer scored 2 goals and 1 field goal).
- Highest capped Broncos player – 355
- Most games at a single club – 355

Apps	Tries	Goals	F/G	Points	Correct to
355	123	341/506	21	1,195	5 December 2011

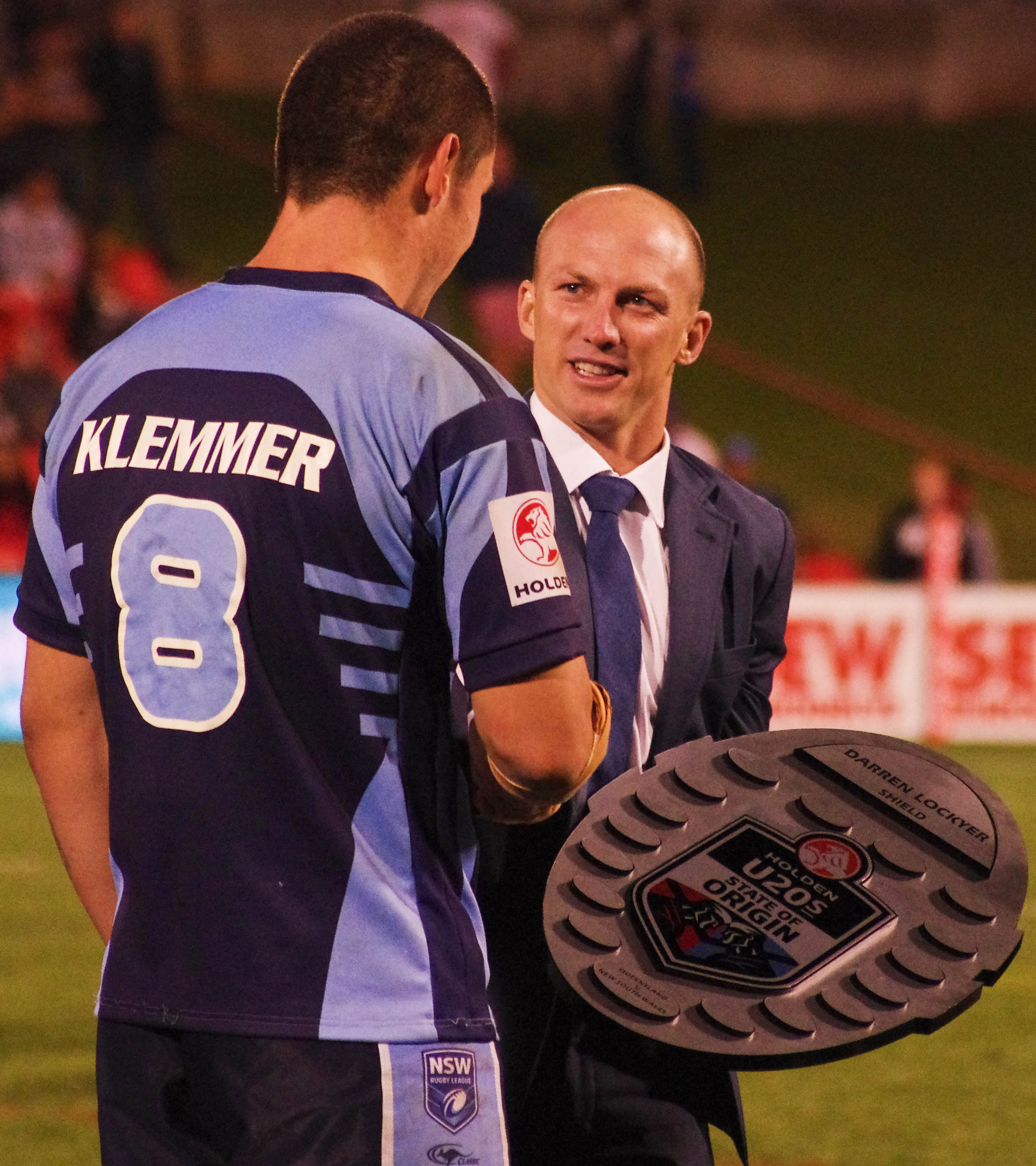
David Klemmer & Lockyer in 2013

==== Queensland Maroons ====
(Correct to 29 July 2011)

- Played in a record 36 State of Origin Games
- Man of the Match 3 times (2001, 2006, 2010)
- Played 2 Tri-Series Matches for Queensland during the 1997 Super League Season (1 goal; 2 points)
- Captained in 22 State of Origin Games (second only to Wally Lewis with 30)
- Wally Lewis Medal for player of the series, 2006
- Part of the Series Winning Sides in 1998, 2001, 2006, 2007, 2009, 2010 and 2011 (also drawn series in 1999 and 2002)
- Captain of the Series Winning Sides in 2001, 2006, 2007, 2009, 2010 and 2011 (injured for all three games in the 2008 series)

Apps	Tries	Goals	F/G	Points	Correct to
36	9	22/30	2	82	29 July 2011

==== Australian Kangaroos ====
- 59 Test matches for Australia
- Played in 4 test matches during the 1997 Super League Season (2 tries; 2 goals; 1 field goal; 13 points) which the Australian Rugby League does not count towards official test records
- Australian Kangaroos Captain 2003–2011
- Record 38 test matches as captain
- Highest Kangaroos try-Scorer with 35 tries
- 9 World Cup Matches for Australia
- 5 Tries and 4 Goals in World Cup Matches
- Golden Boot Award for International Player of the Year 2003 (while playing fullback)
- Golden Boot Award for International Player of the Year 2006 (while playing five-eighth)

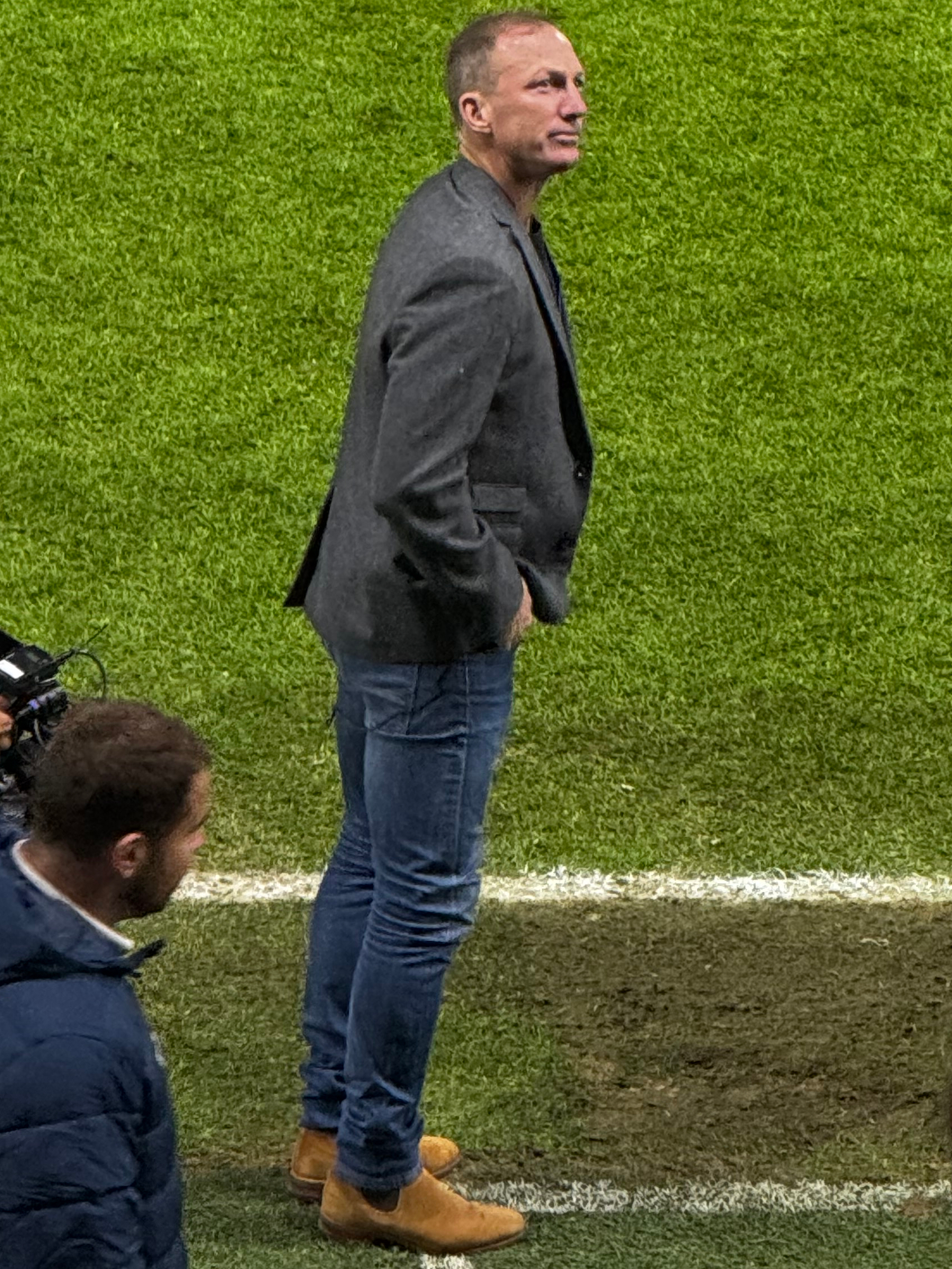
Lockyer pitchside at London in January 2026

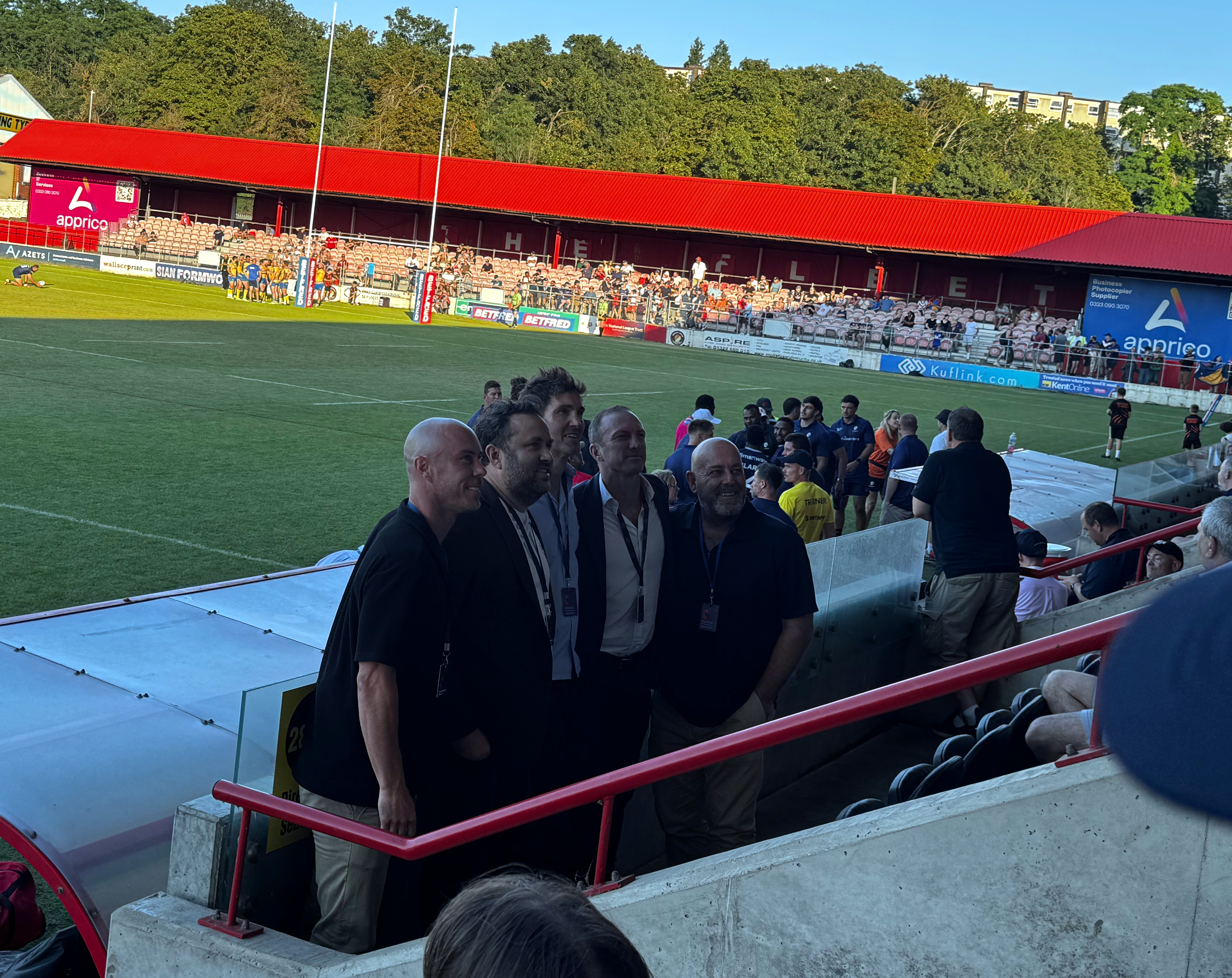
Chris Lynn, Grant Wechsel, Andrew Gray, Darren Lockyer & Darren Lehmann in July 2026

Apps	Tries	Goals	F/G	Points	Correct to
59	35	31	2	204	19 November 2011

== Personal life ==
Darren is married to Loren Pollock. They married in October 2007 and have three sons and a daughter together.

Lockyer joined the Nine Network's rugby league commentary team in 2012, acting as a sideline commentator. Though opting not to have surgery to remove the chipped bone in his throat, he decided to see a speech therapist to help his tone for TV commentary.

In 2012, Lockyer signed a three-year contract with Origin Energy's Australia Pacific coal seam gas (CSG) project. He will be their safety ambassador and also to gain support for a mining operations called Coal Seam gas or CSG.

On Origin's website Darren is investigating the coal seam gas industry for himself. He talks to paid employees and also talks to a farmer that are also making large amount of money from CSG Mining.

Lockyer currently serves as Head of Business Affairs at Mayur Resources, a Brisbane-based energy and minerals company with activities in Papua New Guinea.

He is an Executive Director at Aura Mining.

In September 2025 Lockyer led an ownership group consisting of businessman Grant Wechsel, and Super League executive Gary Hetherington in the successful takeover of the London Broncos.

In October 2025 the London club were controversially overlooked for elevation to the Super League in favour of the Bradford Bulls.

== See also ==
- List of players who have played 300 NRL games
- List of Super League rugby league club owners

Sporting positions
Preceded by Gorden Tallis	Captain; Brisbane Broncos; 2005–2011	Succeeded by Sam Thaiday
Preceded by Gorden Tallis	Captain; Queensland Maroons; 2001	Succeeded by Gorden Tallis
Preceded by Gorden Tallis	Captain; Queensland Maroons; 2004–2007; 2009–2011	Succeeded by Cameron Smith
Preceded by Andrew Johns	Captain; Australian Kangaroos; 2003–2011	Succeeded by Danny Buderus
Awards
Preceded by Brett Kimmorley (Melbourne Storm)	Clive Churchill Medallist; 2000	Succeeded by Andrew Johns (Newcastle Knights)
