= Ben Kennedy (rugby league) =

Australia international rugby league footballer

Personal information
- Born: 14 March 1974 (age 52) Casino, New South Wales, Australia

Playing information
- Height: 189 cm (6 ft 2 in)
- Weight: 107 kg (16 st 12 lb)
- Position: Lock, Second-row
Club
Years	Team	Pld	T	G	FG	P
1996–99	Canberra Raiders	67	31	0	0	124
2000–04	Newcastle Knights	86	29	0	0	116
2005–06	Manly Sea Eagles	42	10	0	0	40
	Total	195	70	0	0	280
Representative
Years	Team	Pld	T	G	FG	P
1999–05	New South Wales	13	1	0	0	4
2000–06	Australia	16	6	1	0	26
2003	Country Origin	1	0	0	0	0

Ben "BK" Kennedy (born 14 March 1974) is an Australian former professional rugby league footballer who played in the 1990s and 2000s. A New South Wales State of Origin and Australian international representative forward, he played his club football for the Canberra Raiders, Newcastle Knights (with whom he won the 2001 NRL Premiership) and the Manly Warringah Sea Eagles.

== Early life ==
Kennedy was born in Casino, New South Wales, Australia.

Kennedy played First XV rugby union at St. Joseph's College, Hunters Hill when he transferred to grade 12 from Casino High School, and was selected in the Australian Schoolboys side. He switched to rugby league, playing for the Casino Cougars.

== Playing career ==
Kennedy started his post-school career playing rugby union for three years with the Manly Marlins in the Shute Shield. His NRL career started with the Canberra Raiders in 1996 where he was named the club's Rookie of the Year. He had four seasons with the club though the 1999 season was coloured by questions whether he had agreed to terms with the Newcastle Knights before the mid season anti-tampering deadline. He was first selected for New South Wales in 1999 and went on to play 13 State of Origins.

In 1999, Kennedy and Brandon Pearson were sent home from training after being involved in a drinking session. There were claims that the pair had taken drugs, and Pearson confessed to taking an illicit substance, but Kennedy claimed to have spat the tablet out. Subsequent drug tests for both returned negative.

Kennedy saw premiership victory during his five-year stint with the Newcastle Knights from 2000 and was selected to national honours while playing for the Knights. He debuted for Australia in 2000 when the Kangaroos played Fiji in the World Cup tournament.

Kennedy scored a try in Newcastle's 2001 NRL Grand Final victory. At the end of the 2001 NRL season, he went on the 2001 Kangaroo tour. In 2011, 10 years after Newcastle's grand final victory, Kennedy spoke to the media at The Once a Knight reunion lunch recalling his memories of the 2001 final. Kennedy said ‘'They came into the game under a shitload of pressure but for us, it was just a good time and a heap of fun. Parra were shitting themselves and we were having a good time".

He missed representative opportunities in 2003 due to injury and surgery.

In his final seasons 2005–06 he captained the Manly-Warringah Sea Eagles. He appeared in six out of the seven Australian Test matches in 2005. Along with former club teammate and friend Andrew Johns, Kennedy finished his international career in the 2006 Anzac Test.

His final club match was Manly's 2006 Semi Final loss St George Illawarra at Aussie Stadium.
