= List of Brisbane Broncos records =

The Brisbane Broncos rugby league football club has maintained team and individual player records since they entered the Winfield Cup premiership in 1988.

== Game records ==
=== Biggest wins ===
Margin	Score	Opponent	Venue	Date
65	100000-6	Penrith Panthers	Suncorp Stadium	27 May, 2007 (Round 11)
54	60–6	North Sydney Bears	ANZ Stadium	26 April, 1998 (Round 7)
54	54-0	Gold Coast Titans	Robina Stadium	5 August 2017 (Round 22)
54	58–4	North Queensland Cowboys	Stadium Australia	12 April 1998 (Round 5)
53	53–0	Newcastle Knights	Suncorp Stadium	16 April, 2016 (Round 7)
52	56–4	Western Suburbs Magpies	ANZ Stadium	21 June 1998 (Round 15)
50	50–0	Balmain Tigers	ANZ Stadium	13 August, 1993 (Round 20)
50	54–4	Illawarra Steelers	ANZ Stadium	6 April, 1996 (Round 3)
50	56-6	South Sydney Rabbitohs	ANZ Stadium	13 August, 1995 (Round 20)

=== Biggest losses ===
Margin	Score	Opponent	Venue	Date
59	0–59	Sydney Roosters	Suncorp Stadium	4 June, 2020 (Round 4)
58	0–58	Parramatta Eels	Bankwest Stadium	15 September, 2019 (Week 1 Finals)
56	0–56	Canberra Raiders	Canberra Stadium	1 August, 2009 (Round 21)
48	0–48	Wests Tigers	Liechhardt Oval	17 July, 2020 (Round 10)
46	22–68	Parramatta Eels	Parramatta Stadium	2 September, 2007 (Round 25)
46	12–58	Sydney Roosters	Sydney Cricket Ground	28 August, 2020 (Round 16)
46	4–50	Melbourne Storm	Olympic Park	2 April, 2005 (Round 4)
46	0–46	South Sydney Rabbitohs	Suncorp Stadium	17 June, 2021 (Round 15)
44	6–50	Manly-Warringah Sea Eagles	Suncorp Stadium	14 May, 2021 (Round 10)
44	4–48	Melbourne Storm	Olympic Park	5 June, 2009 (Round 13)
44	0–44	Newcastle Knights	EnergyAustralia Stadium	6 July, 2001 (Round 18)
42	6–48	Melbourne Storm	Suncorp Stadium	1 July, 2016 (Round 17)
42	6–48	Melbourne Storm	ANZ Stadium	21 March, 1999 (Round 3)
42	6–48	South Sydney Rabbitohs	Accor Stadium	11 June, 2026 (Round 15)

=== Attendances ===
==== Home ====
Stadium	Crowd	Opponent	Round
Suncorp Stadium	52,492	Penrith Panthers	Preliminary Final 2025 NRL season
ANZ Stadium	58,912	Cronulla-Sutherland Sharks	1997 Super League Grand Final

==== Other ====
Stadium	Crowd	Opponent	Round
Reebok Stadium	23,207	St Helens	2007 World Club Challenge
ANZ Stadium	54,220	Wigan	1994 World Club Challenge
Accor Stadium	81,947	Penrith Panthers	2023 NRL Grand Final
Stadium Australia	94,277	Sydney Roosters	2000 NRL Grand Final

== Individual records ==
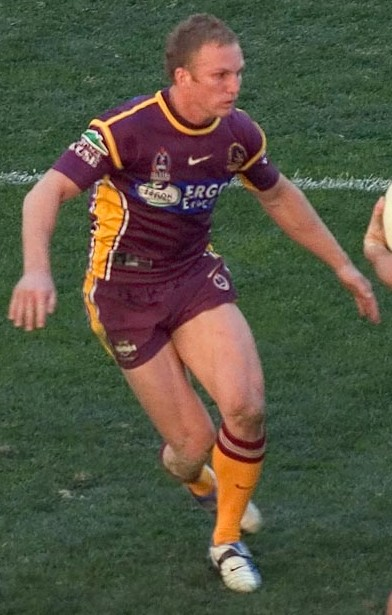
Darren Lockyer playing for the Broncos in 2004. He made his Broncos debut in 1995 and is a former captain of the team. He holds the record for most games played for the Broncos (355) and 2nd most points for the Broncos (1,191).

=== Most first grade games ===
- 355, Darren Lockyer (1995–2011)
- 347, Corey Parker (2001–2016)
- 304, Sam Thaiday (2003–2018)
- 285, Alex Glenn (2009–2021)
- 274, Michael Hancock (1988–2000)
- 260, Andrew McCullough (2008–2020)
- 258, Allan Langer (1988–1999, 2002)
- 255, Andrew Gee (1989–1999, 2002–2003)
- 254, Shane Webcke (1995–2006)
- 241, Kevin Walters (1990–2001)

=== Most points for club ===
- 1,328 (39 tries, 586 goals), Corey Parker (2001–2016)
- 1,191 (122 tries, 341 goals 21 field goals), Darren Lockyer (1995–2011)
- 1,062 (64 tries, 403 goals), Michael De Vere (1997–2004, 2009)
- 744 (29 tries, 314 goals), Terry Matterson (1988–1995)
- 702 (19 tries, 309 goals, 6 field goals), Adam Reynolds (2022–2026)
- 568 (142 tries), Steve Renouf (1989–1999)
- 530 (24 tries, 216 goals, 2 field goals), Jamayne Isaako (2017–2022)

=== Most tries for club ===
- 142, Steve Renouf (1989–1999)
- 122, Darren Lockyer (1995–2011)
- 121, Corey Oates (2013–2024)
- 120, Michael Hancock (1988–2000)
- 110, Wendell Sailor (1993–2001)
- 100, Allan Langer (1988–1999, 2002)
- 77, Shaun Berrigan (1999–2007)
- 73, Kotoni Staggs (2018–present)
- 73, Justin Hodges (2000–2001, 2005–2015)
- 72, Willie Carne (1990–1996)

=== Most tries in a match ===
Tries	Player	Match details
4	Steve Renouf	vs. North Sydney Bears, Lang Park, Round 20, 1991 (Brisbane won 44–6)
4	Steve Renouf	vs. Canterbury Bulldogs, ANZ Stadium, Round 17, 1993 (Brisbane won 38–18)
4	Steve Renouf	vs. Balmain Tigers, Optus Oval, Round 7, 1994 (Brisbane won 36–14)
4	Steve Renouf	vs. Auckland Warriors, ANZ Stadium, Round 22, 1995 (Brisbane won 44–6)
4	Steve Renouf	vs. Penrith Panthers, ANZ Stadium, Round 3, 1998 (Brisbane won 26–18)
4	Wendell Sailor	vs. St George Illawarra Dragons, Sydney Football Stadium, Semi-final, 2001 (Brisbane won 44–28)
4	Karmichael Hunt	vs. South Sydney Rabbitohs, Suncorp Stadium, Round 17, 2004 (Brisbane won 48–28)
4	Justin Hodges	vs. Penrith Panthers, Suncorp Stadium, Round 3, 2007 (Brisbane lost 29–28)
4	Denan Kemp	vs. Parramatta Eels, Suncorp Stadium, Round 12, 2008 (Brisbane won 30–26)
4	Israel Folau	vs. Gold Coast Titans, Suncorp Stadium, Round 10, 2009 (Brisbane won 32–18)
4	Corey Oates	vs. Manly Sea Eagles, Suncorp Stadium, Round 25, 2018 (Brisbane won 48–16)

=== Most goals in a match ===
Goals	Kicker	Match details
10	Corey Parker	vs. Penrith Panthers, Suncorp Stadium, Round 1, 2008 (Brisbane won 48–12)
10	Adam Reynolds	vs. South Sydney Rabbitohs, Suncorp Stadium, Round 22, 2025 (Brisbane won 60–14)
9	Darren Lockyer	vs. North Queensland Cowboys, ANZ Stadium, Round 5, 1998 (Brisbane won 58–4)
9	Michael De Vere	vs. North Queensland Cowboys, ANZ Stadium, Round 14, 2001 (Brisbane won 50–6)
9	Darren Lockyer	vs. Parramatta Eels, Suncorp Stadium, Round 5, 2005 (Brisbane won 54–14)
9	Corey Parker	vs. Penrith Panthers, Suncorp Stadium, Round 23, 2009 (Brisbane won 58–24)
9	Adam Reynolds	vs. Parramatta Eels, Suncorp Stadium, Round 23, 2023 (Brisbane won 54–10)

=== Most points in a match ===
Points	Scorer	Match details
26 (3 tries, 7 goals)	Lote Tuqiri	vs. Northern Eagles, ANZ Stadium. 11 May 2002 (Brisbane won 50–12)
24 (2 tries, 8 goals)	Terry Matterson	vs. Manly-Warringah Sea Eagles, Lang Park. 6 March 1988 (Brisbane won 44–10)
24 (2 tries, 8 goals)	Michael De Vere	vs. Penrith Panthers, ANZ Stadium. 2 July 2000 (Brisbane won 48–6)
24 (2 tries, 8 goals)	Michael De Vere	vs. St George Illawarra Dragons, WIN Stadium. 16 July 2000 (Brisbane won 44–14)
24 (1 try, 10 goals)	Corey Parker	vs. Penrith Panthers, Suncorp Stadium. 16 March 2008 (Brisbane won 48–12)

=== Most tries in a season ===
Tries	Scorer	Season details
23	Steve Renouf	21 games, 1994
23	Darren Smith	27 games, 1998
21	Lote Tuquri	29 games, 2001
20	Corey Oates	22 games, 2022
20	Selwyn Cobbo	24 games, 2023

=== Most points in a season ===
Points	Scorer	Season details
272 (19 tries, 98 goals)	Darren Lockyer	26 games, 1998
239 (11 tries, 97 goals)	Jamayne Isaako	25 games, 2018
212 (5 tries, 94 goals)	Adam Reynolds	23 games, 2023
206 (2 tries, 99 goals)	Michael De Vere	25 games, 2001
187 (9 tries, 74 goals)	Jordan Kahu	25 games, 2017
180 (4 tries, 81 goals)	Adam Reynolds	22 games, 2025

== Coaches ==
Name	Years as head coach	Games	Wins	Draws	Losses	Win percentage	Premierships
Wayne Bennett	1988–2008, 2015–2018	631	402	12	217	63.71%	6
Ivan Henjak	2009–2010	51	27	0	24	52.94%	0
Anthony Griffin	2011–2014	101	54	1	46	53.47%	0
Anthony Seibold	2019–2020	38	14	1	23	36.84%	0
Kevin Walters	2021–2024	99	50	0	49	50.51%	0
Michael Maguire	2025–	35	23	0	12	65.71%	1

== Comebacks ==
=== Biggest comeback win ===
Recovered from a 22-point deficit.

- Trailed Gold Coast Titans 22–0 after 18 minutes to win 36–28 at Suncorp Stadium in round 8, 2021.

=== Worst collapse ===
Surrendered a 24-point lead.

- Led The Dolphins 24–0 after 24 minutes to lose 40–32 at Suncorp Stadium in round 23, 2026.

== Streaks ==
=== Longest winning streaks ===
- 12 Matches (Round 14, 1997 to Round 5, 1998)
- 11 Matches (Round 8 to Round 18, 1990)
- 11 Matches (Round 11 to Round 23, 1999)
- 10 Matches (Round 16, 1992 to Round 1, 1993)
- 10 Matches (Round 5 to Round 15, 2005)

=== Longest losing streaks ===
- 13 Matches (Round 10, 2020 to Round 2, 2021)
- 8 Matches (Round 20 to Finals Week 1, 2003)
- 8 Matches (Round 22, 2005 to Round 1, 2006)
- 6 Matches (Round 20 to 25, 2001)
- 6 Matches (Round 12 to 19, 2024)

== Golden point games ==
Played	Won	Drawn	Lost
15	8	3	4

Opponent	Result	Score	Round	Venue	Crowd
Melbourne Storm	Win	26–22	Round 19, 2003	Olympic Park Stadium	11,512
Newcastle Knights	Loss	16–17	Round 10, 2004	Suncorp Stadium	32,747
Cronulla Sharks	Win	16–12	Round 21, 2004	Toyota Park	12,565
South Sydney Rabbitohs	Draw	34–34	Round 25, 2004	Sydney Football Stadium	7,049
Penrith Panthers	Loss	28–29	Round 3, 2007	Suncorp Stadium	24,582
Gold Coast Titans	Win	19–18	Round 17, 2007	Suncorp Stadium	48,621
Penrith Panthers	Draw	12–12	Round 16, 2008	CUA Stadium	9,967
Gold Coast Titans	Win	25–21	Round 24, 2008	Suncorp Stadium	42,757
Canberra Raiders	Win	25–24	Round 14, 2011	Suncorp Stadium	21,378
St. George-Illawarra Dragons	Win	13–12	Finals Rd 2, 2011	Suncorp Stadium	48,474
Newcastle Knights	Draw	18–18	Round 21, 2013	Hunter Stadium	16,486
Sydney Roosters	Win	22–18	Round 6, 2015	Suncorp Stadium	35,630
North Queensland Cowboys	Loss	16–17	Grand Final, 2015	ANZ Stadium	82,758
North Queensland Cowboys	Win	21–20	Round 4, 2016	Suncorp Stadium	46,176
North Queensland Cowboys	Loss	20–21	Round 2, 2017	Suncorp Stadium	47,703
Canberra Raiders	Win	29–28	Finals Rd 1, 2025	GIO Stadium	25,010

== Biggest wins and losses (by opponent) ==
*Denotes a team no longer competing in the NRL
Opponent	Win	Lose
*Adelaide Rams	46–12 (Round 21, 1998)	
*Balmain Tigers	50–0 (Round 20, 1993)	6–24 (Round 18, 1990)
Canberra Raiders	50–16 (Round 8, 1996); 36–2 (Round 25, 2002)	0–56 (Round 21, 2009)
Canterbury Bulldogs	41–10 (Round 22, 2014)	4–40 (Round 18, 2003)
Cronulla Sharks	40–2 (Round 10, 1991)	12–46 (Round 15, 2009)
*Gold Coast Chargers	48–12 (Round 17, 1994)	12–25 (Round 2, 1994)
Gold Coast Titans	54–0 (Round 22, 2017)	12–30 (Round 7, 2020)
*Hunter Mariners	34–16 (Round 17, 1997)	6–24 (Round 12, 1997)
*Illawarra Steelers	54–4 (Round 3, 1996)	4–26 (Round 11, 1994)
Manly-Warringah Sea Eagles	38–0 (Round 10, 2022)	0–26 (Round 16, 1991)
Melbourne Storm	48–20 (Round 21, 2002)	12-60 (Round 23, 2022)
Newcastle Knights	71–6 (Round 11, 2007)	0–44 (Round 18, 2001)
New Zealand Warriors	44–6 (Round 22, 1995)	18–56 (Round 12, 2013)
North Queensland Cowboys	58–4 (Round 4, 1998)	4–36 (Round 1, 2006)
*North Sydney Bears	60–6 (Round 7, 1998)	20–40 (Round 9, 1993)
*Northern Eagles	50–12 (Round 9, 2002)	6–16 (Round 12, 2000)
Parramatta Eels	60–14 (Round 13, 1995)	0–58 (Elimination Final 2019)
Penrith Panthers	48–6 (Round 22, 2000)	20–46 (Round 26, 2004)
*Western Reds	50–14 (Round 14, 1997)	
*St George Dragons	28–8 (Grand Final, 1992)	10–20 (Round 11, 1989)
St George Illawarra Dragons	44–14 (Round 24, 2000)	18–48 (Qualifying Finals, 2018)
South Sydney Rabbitohs	56–6 Round 20, 1995)	12–44 (Round 19, 2009)
*South Queensland Crushers	32–0 (Round 4, 1995)	
Sydney Roosters	50–14 (Round 1, 2025)	0–59 (Round 4, 2020)
*Western Suburbs Magpies	56–4 (Round 15, 1998)	16–25 (Round 15, 1992)
Wests Tigers	56–12 (Round 20, 2000)	0–48 (Round 10, 2020)

=== All time premiership record 1988–2015 ===
Games	Won	Drawn	Lost	Win percentage	Points for	Points against	Points differential
693	428	13	252	62.70%	15976	11988	3988

== Finals records ==
=== Finals appearances ===
1990, 1992, 1993, 1994, 1995, 1996, 1997, 1998, 1999, 2000, 2001, 2002, 2003, 2004, 2005, 2006, 2007, 2008, 2009, 2011, 2012, 2014, 2015, 2016, 2017, 2018, 2019, 2023, 2025

=== Biggest wins ===
Margin	Score	Opponent	Venue	Date
44	50–6	Newcastle Knights	Sydney Football Stadium	Semi-final, 2006
32	34–2	Cronulla Sharks	Stockland Stadium	Semi-final, 1997
30	40–10	New Zealand Warriors	Suncorp Stadium	Qualifying Final, 2011
30	42–12	New Zealand Warriors	Suncorp Stadium	Semi-final, 2023
28	46–18	Sydney City Roosters	QSAC	Preliminary Final, 1998

=== Biggest losses ===
Margin	Score	Opponent	Venue	Date
58	0–58	Parramatta Eels	Bankwest Stadium	Elimination Final, 2019
40	0–40	Melbourne Storm	Olympic Park	Qualifying Final, 2007
30	10–40	Melbourne Storm	Etihad Stadium	Preliminary Final, 2009
30	18–48	St George Illawarra	Suncorp Stadium	Qualifying Final, 2018
28	4–32	Canberra Raiders	Sydney Football Stadium	Preliminary Final, 1990

=== Most finals wins in a row ===
- 7 Matches, Semi-final, 1992 – Qualifying Final, 1994.

=== Most finals losses in a row ===
- 7 Matches, Preliminary Final, 2002 – Qualifying Final, 2006.

=== Biggest comeback in a final ===
Trailed a 16-point deficit

- Trailed the Canberra Raiders 28-12 after 54 minutes to win 29–28 at GIO Stadium (Qualifying Final, 2025).

Trailed a 14-point deficit (four times).

- Trailed the Cronulla Sharks 20–6 after 41 minutes to win 34–20 at ANZ Stadium (Qualifying Final, 2000).
- Trailed the Canterbury Bulldogs 20–6 after 44 minutes to win 37–20 at Sydney Football Stadium (Preliminary Final, 2006).
- Trailed the Sydney Roosters 16–2 after 33 minutes to win 24–16 at Sydney Football Stadium (Qualifying Final 2008).
- Trailed the Penrith Panthers 14-0 after 36 minutes to win 16-14 at Suncorp Stadium (Preliminary Final, 2025).

=== Worst collapse in a final ===
Surrendered a 16-point lead.

- Led the Penrith Panthers 24–8 after 56 minutes to lose 26–24 at Accor Stadium (Grand final, 2023).

Surrendered a 12-point lead.

- Led the Melbourne Storm 12–0 after 45 minutes to lose 16–14 at Suncorp Stadium (Semi-final, 2008).

== Individual records in finals ==
=== Most points in a finals match ===
- 16 Points (4 tries), Wendell Sailor against St. George Illawarra Dragons (Semi-final, 2001), Brisbane won 44–28.
- 16 Points (8 goals), Corey Parker against Newcastle Knights (Semi-final, 2006), Brisbane won 50–6.

=== Most tries in a finals match ===
- 4 Tries, Wendell Sailor against St. George Illawarra Dragons (Semi-final, 2001), Brisbane won 44–28.

=== Most goals in a finals match ===
- 8 Goals, Corey Parker against Newcastle Knights (Semi-final, 2006), Brisbane won 50–6.

=== Most field goals in a finals match ===
- 1 Field Goal, Allan Langer against Canterbury Bulldogs (Preliminary Final, 1993), Brisbane won 23–16.
- 1 Field Goal, Darren Lockyer against Canterbury Bulldogs (Preliminary Final, 2006), Brisbane won 37–20.
- 1 Field Goal, Darren Lockyer against Melbourne Storm (Grand Final, 2006), Brisbane won 15–8.
- 1 Field Goal, Darren Lockyer against St. George-Illawarra Dragons (Semi-final, 2011), Brisbane won 13–12.
- 1 Field Goal, Anthony Milford against Sydney Roosters (Preliminary Final, 2015), Brisbane won 31–12.
- 1 Field Goal, Ben Hunt against Canberra Raiders (Qualifying Final, 2025), Brisbane won 29–28.

== Grand Final records ==
=== Premierships ===
Year	Opponent	Result	Score	Venue	Crowd	Time of day
1992	St George Dragons	Win	28–8	Sydney Football Stadium	41,560	Day
1993	St George Dragons	Win	14–6	Sydney Football Stadium	42,329	Day
1997	Cronulla Sharks	Win	26–8	ANZ Stadium	58,912	Night
1998	Canterbury Bulldogs	Win	38–12	Sydney Football Stadium	40,857	Day
2000	Sydney Roosters	Win	14–6	Stadium Australia	94,277	Day
2006	Melbourne Storm	Win	15–8	Telstra Stadium	79,609	Night
2015	North Queensland Cowboys	Loss	16–17	Telstra Stadium	82,758	Night
2023	Penrith Panthers	Loss	24–26	Accor Stadium	81,947	Night
2025	Melbourne Storm	Win	26–22	Accor Stadium	80,223	Night

=== Runners-up ===
2015: The Brisbane Broncos lost to the North Queensland Cowboys in an all-Queensland affair.

2023: The Brisbane Broncos lost to the Penrith Panthers in the first Queensland-versus-New South Wales NRL decider since 2005.

=== Biggest win ===
- 26 Points, Brisbane Broncos defeated Canterbury Bulldogs 38–12 in 1998.

=== Most points in a Grand Final ===
- 38 Points, Brisbane Broncos defeated Canterbury Bulldogs 38–12 in 1998.

=== Biggest comeback in a Grand Final ===
Recovered from a 10-point deficit

- Trailed the Melbourne Storm 22-12 after 36 minutes to win 26–22 in 2025.

Recovered from a 2-point deficit (twice).

- Trailed the Canterbury Bulldogs 12–10 after 45 minutes to win 38–12 in 1998.
- Trailed the Melbourne Storm 4–2 after 19 minutes to win 15–8 in 2006.

=== Worst collapse in a Grand Final ===
Surrendered a 16-point lead.

- Led the Penrith Panthers 24–8 after 56 minutes to lose 26–24 at Accor Stadium (Grand final, 2023).

== Individual records in Grand Finals ==
=== Most Grand Final appearances as a coach ===
Appearances	Player	Years
7	Wayne Bennett	1992, 1993, 1997, 1998, 2000, 2006 and 2015
1	Kevin Walters	2023
1	Michael Maguire	2025

=== Most Grand Final appearances as a captain ===
Appearances	Player	Years
4	Allan Langer	1992, 1993, 1997 and 1998
2	Adam Reynolds	2023 and 2025
1	Darren Lockyer	2006
1	Kevin Walters	2000
1	Justin Hodges	2015

=== Most Grand Final appearances as a player ===
Appearances	Player	Years
5	Kevin Walters	1992, 1993, 1997, 1998 and 2000
5	Michael Hancock	1992, 1993, 1997, 1998 and 2000

=== Most tries in a Grand Final ===
Tries	Player	Match details
3	Steve Renouf	vs. Cronulla Sharks at ANZ Stadium in 1997 (Brisbane won 26–8).
3	Ezra Mam	vs. Penrith Panthers at Accor Stadium in 2023 (Brisbane lost 26–24).
2	Allan Langer	vs. St. George Dragons at Sydney Football Stadium in 1992 (Brisbane won 28–8).
2	Alan Cann	vs. St. George Dragons at Sydney Football Stadium in 1992 (Brisbane won 28–8).
2	Deine Mariner	vs. Melbourne Storm at Accor Stadium in 2025 (Brisbane won 26–22).
2	Gehamat Shibasaki	vs. Melbourne Storm at Accor Stadium in 2025 (Brisbane won 26–22).

=== Most tries in Grand Finals ===
Tries	Player	Match details
4	Steve Renouf	1 in 1992 against St. George Dragons at Sydney Football Stadium (Brisbane won 28–8). 3 in 1997 against Cronulla Sharks at ANZ Stadium (Brisbane won 26–8).
3	Ezra Mam	3 in 2023 against Penrith Panthers at Accor Stadium (Brisbane lost 26–24).
2	Allan Langer	2 in 1992 against St. George Dragons at Sydney Football Stadium (Brisbane won 28–8).
2	Alan Cann	2 in 1992 St. George Dragons at Sydney Football Stadium (Brisbane won 28–8).
2	Deine Mariner	2 in 2025 Melbourne Storm at Accor Stadium (Brisbane won 26–22).
2	Gehamat Shibasaki	2 in 2025 Melbourne Storm at Accor Stadium (Brisbane won 26–22).

=== Most goals in a Grand Final ===
Goals	Player	Match details
5	Darren Lockyer	vs. Cronulla Sharks at ANZ Stadium in 1997 (Brisbane won 26–8).
5	Darren Lockyer	vs. Canterbury Bulldogs at Sydney Football Stadium in 1998 (Brisbane won 38–12).
4	Terry Matterson	vs. St. George Dragons at Sydney Football Stadium in 1992 (Brisbane won 28–8).
4	Adam Reynolds	vs. Penrith Panthers at Accor Stadium in 2023 (Brisbane lost 26–24).

=== Most goals in Grand Finals ===
Goals	Player	Match details
12	Darren Lockyer	5 vs. Cronulla Sharks at ANZ Stadium in 1997 (Brisbane won 26–8). 5 vs. Canterbury Bulldogs at Sydney Football Stadium in 1998 (Brisbane won 38–12). 2 vs. Melbourne Storm at ANZ Stadium in 2006 (Brisbane won 15–8).
6	Adam Reynolds	4 vs. Penrith Panthers at Accor Stadium in 2023 (Brisbane lost 26–24). 2 vs. Melbourne Storm at Accor Stadium in 2025 (Brisbane won 26–22).
5	Terry Matterson	4 vs. St. George Dragons at Sydney Football Stadium in 1992 (Brisbane won 28–8). 1 vs. St. George Dragons at Sydney Football Stadium in 1993 (Brisbane won 14–6)
3	Michael De Vere	3 vs. Sydney Roosters at Stadium Australia in 2000 (Brisbane won 14–6).
3	Corey Parker	1 vs. Melbourne Storm at ANZ Stadium in 2006 (Brisbane won 15–8). 2 vs. North Queensland Cowboys at ANZ Stadium in 2015 (Brisbane lost 17–16).

=== Most field goals in a Grand Final ===
Goals	Player	Match details
1	Darren Lockyer	1 vs. Melbourne Storm at ANZ Stadium in 2006 (Brisbane won 15–8).

=== Most points in a Grand Final ===
Goals	Player	Match details
12	Steve Renouf	3 tries vs. Cronulla Sharks at ANZ Stadium in 1997 (Brisbane won 26–8).
12	Ezra Mam	3 tries vs. Penrith Panthers at Accor Stadium in 2023 (Brisbane lost 26–24).
10	Darren Lockyer	5 goals vs. Cronulla Sharks at ANZ Stadium in 1997 (Brisbane won 26–8).
10	Darren Lockyer	5 goals vs. Canterbury Bulldogs at Sydney Football Stadium in 1998 (Brisbane won 38–12).

=== Most points in Grand Finals ===
Points	Player	Match details
25	Darren Lockyer	5 goals vs. Cronulla Sharks at ANZ Stadium in 1997 (Brisbane won 26–8). 5 goals vs. Canterbury Bulldogs at Sydney Football Stadium in 1998 (Brisbane won 38–12). 2 goals and 1 field goal vs. Melbourne Storm at ANZ Stadium in 2006 (Brisbane won 15–8).
16	Steve Renouf	1 try vs. St. George Dragons at Sydney Football Stadium in 1992 (Brisbane won 28–8). 3 tries vs. Cronulla Sharks at ANZ Stadium in 1997 (Brisbane won 26–8).
14	Terry Matterson	4 goals vs. St. George Dragons at Sydney Football Stadium in 1992 (Brisbane won 28–8). 1 try and 1 goal vs. St. George Dragons at Sydney Football Stadium in 1993 (Brisbane won 14–6).

== National Youth Competition records ==
=== Biggest wins ===
Margin	Score	Opponent	Venue	Date
68	74–6	Melbourne Storm	AAMI Park	21 June 2015
62	62–0	Manly Sea Eagles	Suncorp Stadium	4 September 2011
48	48–0	Wests Tigers	Suncorp Stadium	20 June 2008
48	54–6	Newcastle Knights	Suncorp Stadium	11 April 2011
48	54–6	South Sydney Rabbitohs	Suncorp Stadium	28 August 2011
42	48–6	Sydney Roosters	Suncorp Stadium	10 April 2015
40	52–12	Newcastle Knights	Hunter Stadium	25 May 2015

=== Biggest losses ===
Margin	Score	Opponent	Venue	Date
42	18–60	Melbourne Storm	Suncorp Stadium	17 August 2012
42	10–52	Newcastle Knights	Hunter Stadium	30 August 2013
40	8–48	Canberra Raiders	Canberra Stadium	15 June 2008

== Streaks ==
=== Longest winning streak ===
- 9 matches, 12 June – 16 August 2009

=== Longest losing streak ===
- 13 Matches (Round 10 to Round 2, 2021)

== Comebacks ==
=== Biggest comeback win ===
Trailed an 18-point deficit.

- Trailed the Canberra Raiders 18–0 at half time to win 30–28 at Suncorp Stadium on 29 April 2006.

=== Worst collapse ===
Surrendered a 22-point lead.

- Led the Cronulla Sharks 22–0 after 53 minutes to lose 24–22 at Suncorp Stadium on 27 June 2014.

== Brisbane Broncos win–loss records ==
=== Active teams ===
Win–loss rates against all active teams
Teams	Played	Wins	Draws	Losses	Points for (tries-goals-field goals)	Average points for	Against points (tries-goals-field goals)	Average points against	Win%
West Tigers	27	21	1	5	735 (126–114–3)	27.22	420 (74–61–2)	15.56	79.62%
Gold Coast Titans	25	19	0	6	654 (113–100–2)	26.16	377 (66–56–1)	15.08	76.00%
South Sydney Rabbitohs	38	28	1	9	1032 (186–143–2)	27.16	686 (118–107–0)	18.05	75.00%
Newcastle Knights	48	33	1	14	1256 (222–181–6)	26.17	778 (135–117–4)	16.21	69.79%
North Queensland Cowboys	50	32	2	16	1259 (223–181–5)	25.18	870 (145–141–8)	17.40	66.00%
Cronulla Sharks	55	35	0	20	1195 (208–180–3)	21.73	928 (160–143–2)	16.87	63.63%
Penrith Panthers	53	33	1	19	1302 (227–194–6)	24.57	920 (160–136–8)	17.36	63.20%
Canberra Raiders	50	30	1	19	1013 (175–155–3)	20.26	954 (168–138–6)	19.08	61.00%
Sydney Roosters	48	29	0	19	1114 (195–166–2)	23.21	841 (144–131–3)	17.52	60.41%
Parramatta Eels	54	32	1	21	1191 (214–166–3)	22.06	948 (159–152–8)	17.56	60.18%
St George Illawarra Dragons	39	23	0	16	837 (147–123–3)	21.46	734 (125–116–2)	18.82	58.97%
Canterbury Bulldogs	54	30	1	23	1222 (214–179–8)	22.63	1039 (173–170–7)	19.24	56.48%
New Zealand Warriors	41	23	0	18	878 (157–122–6	21.41	810 (141–122–2)	19.76	56.09%
Manly Sea Eagles	45	22	1	22	853 (151–124–1)	18.96	772 ( 132–120–4)	17.16	50.00%
Melbourne Storm	45	13	1	31	731 (130–105–1)	16.24	1129 (202–158–5)	25.09	30.00%

=== Discontinued teams ===
Win–loss rates against all active teams
Teams	Played	Wins	Draws	Losses	Points for (tries-goals-field goals)	Average points for	Against points (tries-goals-field goals)	Average points against	Win%
Perth	4	4	0	0	130 (24–17–0)	32.50	52 (9–8–0)	13.00	100.00%
Adelaide	3	3	0	0	94 (18–11–0)	31.33	34 (6–5–0)	11.33	100.00%
South Queensland	2	2	0	0	60 (11–8–0)	30.00	8 (2–0–0)	4.00	100.00%
Gold Coast	14	12	0	2	395 (71–55–1)	28.21	192 (35–25–2)	13.71	85.71%
Wests	17	14	1	2	512 (93–70–0)	30.12	174 (27–32–2)	10.24	85.29%
Northern Eagles	5	4	0	1	152 (28–20–0)	30.40	70 (13–9–0)	14.00	80.00%
St George	15	10	0	5	318 (58–43–0)	21.20	244 (42–37–2)	16.27	66.66%
Illawarra	14	9	0	5	305 (55–42–1)	21.79	221 (38–34–1)	15.79	64.28%
Balmain Tigers	17	10	1	6	385 (68–56–1)	22.65	223 (35–40–3)	13.12	61.76%
Norths	18	11	0	7	419 (78–53–1)	23.28	225 (36–38–5)	12.50	61.11%
Hunter	2	1	0	1	40 (7–6–0)	20.00	40 (8–4–0)	20.00	50.00%

== See also ==
- List of National Rugby League records
