= 2007 World Club Challenge =

2007 rugby league match

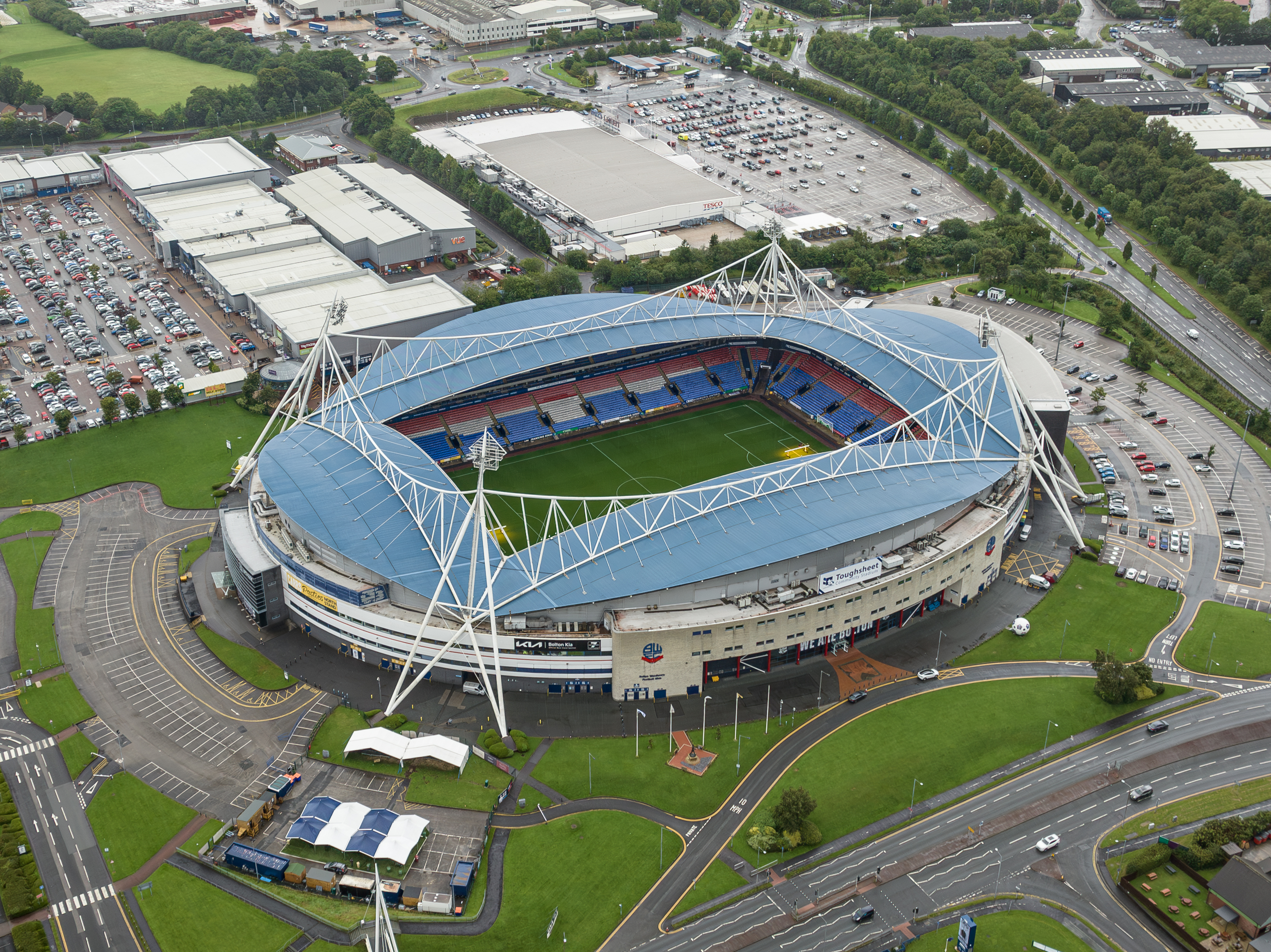
- The Reebok Stadium hosted the match
St. Helens	Brisbane Broncos
(Super League)	(National Rugby League)
18	14
	1	2	Total
ST H	6	12	18
BRI	8	6	14
- Date: 23 February 2007
- Stadium: Reebok Stadium
- Location: Bolton, England
- Man of the Match: Paul Sculthorpe
- Referee: Steve Clarke (Australia)
- Attendance: 23,207

Broadcast partners
- Broadcasters: (United Kingdom) Sky Sports
- Commentators: Eddie Hemmings; Mike Stephenson

The 2007 Carnegie World Club Challenge was played between Super League XI champions, St. Helens and 2006 National Rugby League premiers, the Brisbane Broncos. It was a replay of the 2001 World Club Challenge, and both clubs' fifth WCC appearance. The match was played on the night of 23 February at Reebok Stadium, Bolton before a crowd of 23,207.

== Background ==
=== Brisbane Broncos ===
On 1 October 2006 the Brisbane Broncos clinched the 2006 National Rugby League title in a 15 - 8 defeat of Melbourne Storm to earn a place in the new year's World Club Challenge. Already the leading Australian club in number of Challenge appearances, 2007's match would make it the 4th time Brisbane would travel to England for the match (they also hosted the World Club challenge in 1994, making it a total of 5 appearances.

=== St Helens ===
On 14 October 2006 St Helens qualified for the Challenge after being crowned the 2006 Super League champions, defeating Hull F.C. 26 - 4 in the Grand Final. They went into the match against the Broncos on the back of consecutive defeats in the early rounds of the 2007 Super League XII season.

== Pre-match ==
Brisbane arrived in the United Kingdom with just an 18-man squad for two scheduled matches, the World Club Challenge and a warm-up game. Brisbane played their warm-up match against National League Two side Celtic Crusaders at the Brewery Field in Bridgend on 15 February 2007, eight days before the world title contest. The warm-up watch was titled the Bulmers Original Cider Challenge. During the match, Brisbane players wore a new type of playing kit that allowed them to dry their hands during play using a chamois panel on the back of the shorts. Brisbane eventually beat Celtic 32–6 but had first been held scoreless during the opening quarter of the match.

As they had brought with them only 18 players, the Broncos were worried about suffering injuries against the Crusaders. Brisbane's contingency was two players in Australia ready to fly to Britain should they be needed. If more than two injuries were suffered, the Broncos planned to borrow former Brisbane players currently with Celtic Crusaders subject to applying for and receiving the relevant permissions.

== Match details ==
The Broncos were without three of their 2006 NRL grand final-winning team: star prop forward Shane Webcke had retired, utility back Casey McGuire had signed with another club, and David Stagg was also absent.

St Helens	Position	Brisbane Broncos
1. Paul Wellens	Fullback	1. Karmichael Hunt
2. Ade Gardner	Wing	2. Darius Boyd
3. Matthew Gidley	Centre	3. Brent Tate
4. Willie Talau	Centre	4. Justin Hodges
5. Francis Meli	Wing	5. Steve Michaels
6. Leon Pryce	Stand-off	6. Darren Lockyer (c)
7. Sean Long (c)	Scrum-half	7. Shane Perry
8. Nick Fozzard	Prop	8. Dane Carlaw
14. James Roby	Hooker	9. Shaun Berrigan
10. Jason Cayless	Prop	10. Petero Civoniceva
11. Lee Gilmour	Second-row	11. Corey Parker
15. Mike Bennett	Second-row	12. Brad Thorn
12. Jon Wilkin	Loose forward	13. Tonie Carroll
13. Paul Sculthorpe	Int.	14. Sam Thaiday
17. James Graham	Int.	15. Greg Eastwood
18. Bryn Hargreaves	Int.	16. Ben Hannant
9. Keiron Cunningham	Int.	17. Michael Ennis
Daniel Anderson	Coach	Wayne Bennett

The Broncos were the first to score when St. Helens winger Ade Gardner failed to secure a Darren Lockyer cross-field bomb close to his own try line, providing Brisbane's second-rower Corey Parker with a gift try which he went on to successfully convert. A further two points were added when a Matt Gidley tackle on Shaun Berrigan resulted in Australian referee Steve Clarke awarding a penalty to the Broncos. The Saints hit back though with a movement out wide finished off by Gardner. Paul Sculthorpe successfully adding the extra two saw a half-time scoreline of 8 - 6 in favour of the visitors.

In the second half Brisbane were once again the first to score, with their captain Darren Lockyer kicking across field for winger Darius Boyd to catch the ball and get a try. St. Helens Loose forward Sculthorpe then scored a try at the other end which he also converted, levelling the score at 12 all. Another tackling infringement by Gidley brought about a penalty, which the Broncos successfully kicked, giving them a two-point lead going into the final quarter of the match. But in the seventieth minute, from twenty metres out, Sean Long put a high kick across field and Ade Garnder, leaping up over the Brisbane defence, caught the ball and came down with it over the try-line, putting the Saints in front and ensuring a tense final ten minutes. The conversion from Sculthorpe brought the score to 18 - 14 in favour of the English champions, who managed to preserve that scoreline until the final siren.

St Helens 18	Brisbane 14
3 Tries: Ade Gardner (2); Paul Sculthorpe	2 Tries: Darius Boyd; Corey Parker
3 Goals: Paul Sculthorpe (3/3)	3 Goals: Corey Parker (3/4)

Paul Sculthorpe, St. Helens returning from injury was judged to be Man-of-the-Match. The win meant a clean sweep of the trophies for St. Helens, having already won the 2006 Challenge Cup and the 2006 Super League Grand Final.
