= 2006 Finals Series =

2006 Finals Series can refer to:

- 2006 AFL Finals Series
- 2006 NRL Finals Series
