= Karmichael Hunt =

Australian international rugby league footballer

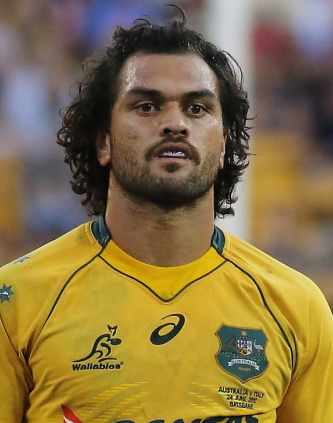

Personal information
- Full name: Karmichael Neil Matthew Hunt
- Born: 17 November 1986 (age 40) Auckland, New Zealand
- Height: 186 cm (6 ft 1 in)
- Weight: 92 kg (203 lb; 14 st 7 lb)

Playing information
- Position: Fullback
Club
Years	Team	Pld	T	G	FG	P
2004–09	Brisbane Broncos	126	53	0	1	213
2021	Brisbane Broncos	2	0	0	0	0
	Total	128	53	0	1	213
Representative
Years	Team	Pld	T	G	FG	P
2006–09	Queensland	10	0	0	0	0
2006–08	Australia	11	4	0	0	16

Coaching information
Representative
Years	Team	Gms	W	D	L	W%
2023–	Cook Islands	10	1	0	9	10
- Source: As of 25 October 2026

Rugby union career
- Position: Fullback / Centre / Wing
Senior career
Years	Team	Apps	(Points)
2009-10	Biarritz Olympique	15	(15)
2015-18	Queensland Reds	32	(23)
2015	Brisbane City	18	(25)
2019-20	NSW Waratahs	24	(0)
International career
Years	Team	Apps	(Points)
2017	Australia	6	(0)
Australian rules football career
Personal information
- Position: Midfield
Playing career
Years	Club	Games (Goals)
2011-14	Gold Coast Suns	44 (6)

Karmichael Neil Matthew Hunt (born 17 November 1986) is an Australian professional rugby league coach who is the head coach of the Souths Logan Magpies in the Queensland Cup, as well as the Cook Islands national rugby league team and a former player.

Having played professional rugby league, rugby union and Australian rules football, Hunt was the second person (after Ray Millington) in Australia to reach an elite professional level in three different football codes. He was born in Auckland, New Zealand, but has represented Australia in both rugby codes after his family emigrated there when he was aged 11.

Hunt made his debut for the Brisbane Broncos in the National Rugby League in 2004 and won the Dally M Rookie of the Year award. Primarily a fullback, he played for Brisbane until 2009, and was part of the Broncos team which won the Grand Final in 2006. In a controversial move, Hunt chose to play for Australia instead of his native New Zealand, citing a lifelong dream of playing for Queensland in the State of Origin series. Hunt's performance in the 2006 NRL season resulted in his selection for Queensland and Australia (the Kangaroos) in 2006.

In July 2009, he signed a three-year contract with Australian Football League expansion team, Gold Coast, whose inaugural season was in 2011. In 2010, while contracted to the Gold Coast, he played a season with Biarritz Olympique in the French Top 14 rugby union competition. After beginning his AFL career, Hunt was named in the Courier Mail 2011 Queensland Australian rules football Team of the Year. Overall, however, his 4-year stint in the AFL received mixed reviews, though one highlight was when he kicked the match-winning goal against Richmond which broke the club's twelve-month winning drought.

In 2015, he returned to rugby union, playing for the Queensland Reds and New South Wales Waratahs. He made his international debut for Australia (the Wallabies) in 2017 and has won six caps.

In February 2015, Hunt was arrested and charged with four counts for the supply of cocaine for personal use or to on-supply cocaine to friends and colleagues between June and December 2014.

== Early life ==
Hunt was born on 17 November 1986 in Auckland, New Zealand, to Hans and Tera Hunt, from Samoa and the Cook Islands. He began playing rugby league at the age of four for the Avondale Wolves before moving to Australia as an eleven-year-old in 1997, the family moved to the suburb of Algester in Brisbane, Australia. Upon moving to Brisbane, Hunt played junior rugby league for the Souths club in Acacia Ridge. Hunt's childhood hero was Michael Jordan and, prior to his rugby league success, he dreamt of playing basketball in the United States.

In 2000, Hunt made his representative debut with the Under-14 South–East team of the Queensland Rugby League (QRL), in the fullback position. In 2001, he became part of the Under-15 Australian merit side, and, upon seeing him play rugby league, NRL club Brisbane Broncos scout Cyril Connell offered him a scholarship with the club. Hunt accepted the Broncos scholarship and, after strong performance at Souths Acacia Ridge and Sunnybank High School, received a scholarship to the Anglican Church Grammar School (Churchie).

At Churchie, Hunt switched to rugby union and was a dominant figure in the school's team, which played in the Queensland Great Public Schools (GPS) competition. As a fullback, he led his team to an undefeated season in 2003, and he was one of the best players in the GPS competition. While playing rugby union at ACGS, Hunt also played for the Queensland Schoolboys rugby league team against New South Wales, in the position of lock. Along with Anton LaVin, he won the Bob Templeton Trophy for Queensland's leading schoolboy player. During the rugby off-season in 2003, Hunt played six matches of Australian rules football code for the ACGS school side under captain Scott Harding. During which time he was identified by Australian Football League talent manager Mark Browning as an "AFL prospect".

In 2003, Hunt was selected for the Australian Schoolboys rugby league representative team to tour New Zealand, playing three matches under coach Rod Patison. Hunt scored a try in each game and was named best back of the series. Australian Schoolboys' coaching staff predicted that Hunt was the most likely Australian schoolboy to make a debut in the NRL.

In 2004, St. George Illawarra Dragons coach Nathan Brown spoke about Hunt and a discussion he had with recruitment officer Craig Young a year earlier, when Hunt was still under contract with the Broncos. "He's a terrific player. Craig Young who scouts for us watched him play last year and said give him $80,000 (to lure him to Sydney). I said 'where would we play him?' And he (Young) said 'wing, fullback, centre, five eighth, lock – doesn't matter because he'll play first grade and play for Australia for the next 12 years'." Hunt was questioned by police in 2009 relating to an alleged sexual assault in a Brisbane nightclub.

== Rugby League career ==
=== Brisbane Broncos (2004–2009) ===
==== Debut season ====
Hunt's 2001 scholarship came to fruition when he joined the Brisbane Broncos' main squad at the end of the 2003 NRL season. He participated in the team's off-season training in early 2004, under the guidance of Broncos' coach Wayne Bennett, and was selected to participate in the Broncos' pre-season trial games in February. Hunt had expected to play most of the 2004 season in the Queensland Cup, the second-tier rugby league competition in Queensland. However, after Darren Lockyer's shift to the five-eighth position and Hunt playing both trial games on the wing and scoring a try in the first game against the Melbourne Storm, he was selected to make his National Rugby League (NRL) debut for the Broncos in the first round of the 2004 season against the New Zealand Warriors, making him the youngest ever Bronco at seventeen. Coach Bennett's decision to name Hunt as the starting fullback was somewhat surprising, due to Hunt's original selection, the week before the match, on the interchange bench. He replaced Motu Tony in the fullback position.

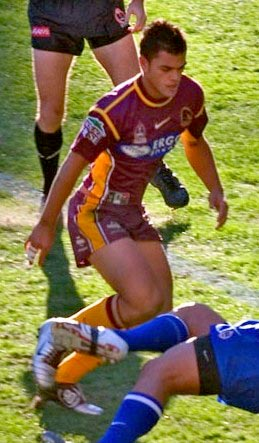
Hunt in action in 2004, his debut NRL season.

Hunt described Bennett and Broncos teammate Darren Lockyer as the greatest influences on his league career. With Lockyer's move from fullback to five-eighth, Hunt had large shoes to fill in the position. Hunt proved to be a success for the Broncos; he played every game in 2004, missing just four minutes in total, and was the team's top try-scorer. Bennett remarked of him that "Karmichael has an attitude just like Darren Lockyer where he can make a mistake and kiss it off and just get on with the game, It's a wonderful quality to have and you'd like every player to have it. A lot of guys dwell on mistakes and it stays with them too long."

Hunt drew criticism for his style of returning the football; upon receiving the ball, he would run straight at opposition players rather than attempting to evade them. As a result, he received several high tackles, causing the Broncos to ask the NRL to protect Hunt by punishing opposition players more severely. The referees' board supported this position, and stated that fullbacks such as Hunt needed to be protected due to greater risk of injury.

The performance of the 2004 NRL rookies, including Hunt, had been much anticipated. After a few games, his peers and the media singled Hunt out as the next superstar of the game. To minimise the impact of excessive media pressure on Hunt's performance, Bennett banned him from speaking to the media. Hunt scored four tries in the Round 17 clash with the South Sydney Rabbitohs, equalling the team record. His form earned him the Brisbane Broncos and Dally M Rookie of the Year awards.

==== 2005 ====
At the end of 2004, Hunt signed a contract with the Broncos for an additional two years, with the intention of staying at the club for the rest of his career. On re-signing, Hunt stated, "I look around and see guys like Webbie and Locky who have been here for their entire careers, and it's something I would like to do. If I can, I want to be a one-club player too. Playing footy is not just about 80 minutes out on the field every week. For me it is a career and I want to be happy where I am, satisfied that my game is progressing and that I am learning all the time to be a better player."

Bennett advised Hunt to have fun and enjoy himself like any other teenager, so that it would not affect his second year in first-grade rugby league. However, Hunt's second season was not considered as successful as his first, despite his only missing one game, a situation that the media labelled "Karmichael's second-year syndrome". Hunt was retained in the fullback position despite his perceived lack of form, which included fewer tries and fewer kick returns than in his debut season.

Hunt scored a try in each of the first two games of the season. In Round 6, he was knocked unconscious by a high tackle from a St George Illawarra Dragons player, Shaun Timmins. The following week, still suffering from the effects of concussion, he missed his first NRL game since his debut. Hunt returned a week later and scored a try in each of the next three games. However, he only scored three more tries in the remaining sixteen weeks of the season. Hunt was a part of the junior Australian representative team at the end of the 2005 season, but was not considered for the game against Papua New Guinea for personal reasons.

==== 2006 ====
Hunt in action against for the Broncos

Prior to the 2006 National Rugby League season, Wayne Bennett, backed by former Broncos halfback Allan Langer, groomed Hunt as a key play-maker, able to steer the play from the halfback position, with the intention of taking pressure off Darren Lockyer and then-halfback, Brett Seymour. In a trial match against the North Queensland Cowboys, Hunt played in the halfback position but he returned to fullback for the opening NRL game. Hunt scored two tries against the Canberra Raiders in Round 8 of the competition, following this performance with another two tries against Manly in Round 10.

Hunt sustained a foot injury in the Broncos Round 15 match and was sidelined for eight weeks. While out injured, early in the morning on 30 July 2006, Hunt was at the scene of a fight outside a Brisbane night club in Brisbane's CBD. The media, notably Channel 7 and Channel 10, alleged Hunt was the instigator of the incident, claiming he squirted water on a woman. The Broncos denied he had any involvement in the incident although a woman gave his name to police. Hunt also denied involvement, insisting he was merely a bystander.

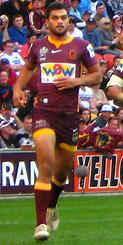
Hunt in action for Brisbane

When Hunt's contract ended at the end of 2006, concern mounted as to whether the Broncos would be able to retain him. The Broncos could only offer Hunt about $200,000 a season, while other teams were able to offer him $300,000. The South Sydney Rabbitohs reportedly offered Hunt up to $500,000 a season, but despite these offers, on 29 June, he signed with the Broncos for a further three years. Brisbane Broncos chief executive Bruno Cullen announced that contract negotiations were "straightforward" and there was never any doubt that Hunt wanted to stay at the Broncos.

During Hunt's injury, Bennett moved Broncos teammate Justin Hodges to fullback and Hodges was impressive in the position. When Hunt returned to the Broncos side in Round 25 against the Parramatta Eels, he was forced to play on the wing due to Hodges' good form. Hunt and Hodges continued to switch the fullback position for the remainder of the season. Hunt missed the first week of the finals due to a hamstring problem but was able to return a week later.

The Broncos went on to reach the 2006 NRL Grand Final against the Melbourne Storm, with Hunt playing on the wing and Hodges at fullback, and Brisbane winning 15–8. After that Hunt was selected to represent Australia in the 2006 Rugby League Tri-Nations tournament, playing at fullback in the Kangaroos victory over New Zealand in the final.

==== 2007 ====
As NRL premiers, in the 2007 pre-season the Broncos travelled to England for the 2007 World Club Challenge. Hunt played at fullback in Brisbane's loss to St. Helens.

Bennett pulled his first selection surprise of 2007, experimenting with Hunt at halfback for the opening game of the season. At the time Bennett maintained that this would be a long term switch, but due to the Broncos' poor form, Hunt returned to fullback for Round 3. Hunt was selected to play for the Australian national team at fullback in the 2007 ANZAC Test match against New Zealand, scoring a try in the Kangaroos' 30–6 victory.

In Round 11, the Broncos had their biggest victory yet, winning 71–6 over Newcastle. In that game Hunt set up three tries and scored one himself. The Brisbane newspaper The Sunday Mail described Hunt as not performing consistently throughout the 2007 season for the Broncos. However, Hunt played an exceptionally good game in Round 15 against the Wests Tigers, scoring three tries, assisting in a try and gaining 281 metres in the Broncos' win.

Hunt's skill on the field and positive influence on other team members led to his emergence, early in 2007, as a future candidate for the Broncos captaincy. Broncos chief executive Bruno Cullen stated that such a move would have his and the Broncos management's full support. Current captain Lockyer also gave his support to Hunt being the next captain, saying that he has the respect of fellow players and the necessary leadership qualities.

After Round 18 of the competition, during a training session on 20 July 2007, Hunt injured his hamstring and was originally scheduled to miss six weeks. However, his recovery took longer than expected, and he was eventually ruled out for the rest of the season. Despite playing only thirteen games for the Broncos in 2007, he received the Broncos award for Best Back.

==== 2008 ====
Over the 2008 pre-season Hunt recovered from his hamstring injury and played in his first match since being injured in a 23 February 2008 trial match against Canberra. After playing another trial in the position of five eighth, Hunt returned to first grade in Round 1 of the 2008 NRL competition playing fullback in the Broncos 48–12 win over Penrith. In Round 2 Hunt shoulder charged Sydney Roosters five eighth Braith Anasta in the head and was subsequently placed on report. The NRL judiciary committee charged Hunt with a Grade-Three Careless High tackle and if pleading guilty would miss one week of premiership competition. Pleading not guilty to the charge, Hunt was cleared to play by the judiciary with no penalty being given but missed one week anyway due to a knee injury.

In July 2008, speculation began on what Hunt would do past the expiration of his contract at the end of the 2009 season. With some high-profile defections of star league players to cashed-up rugby union clubs from France, Hunt was expected to be the target of offers from overseas and within Australia. Australian rugby union club Queensland Reds stated their intentions to attempt to lure Hunt to the rugby union code, with the reasoning being his successful young career in rugby union. From within the NRL competition, Sydney based clubs Sydney Roosters and St. George Illawarra Dragons stated their intentions to make a bid for Hunt for his services in the 2010 season, claiming they could double Hunt's three-year deal from 2006, reported to be around $200,000. The Broncos however, were still expected to be a factor in his decision with the possibility of the captaincy a possible lure to remain with the Broncos.

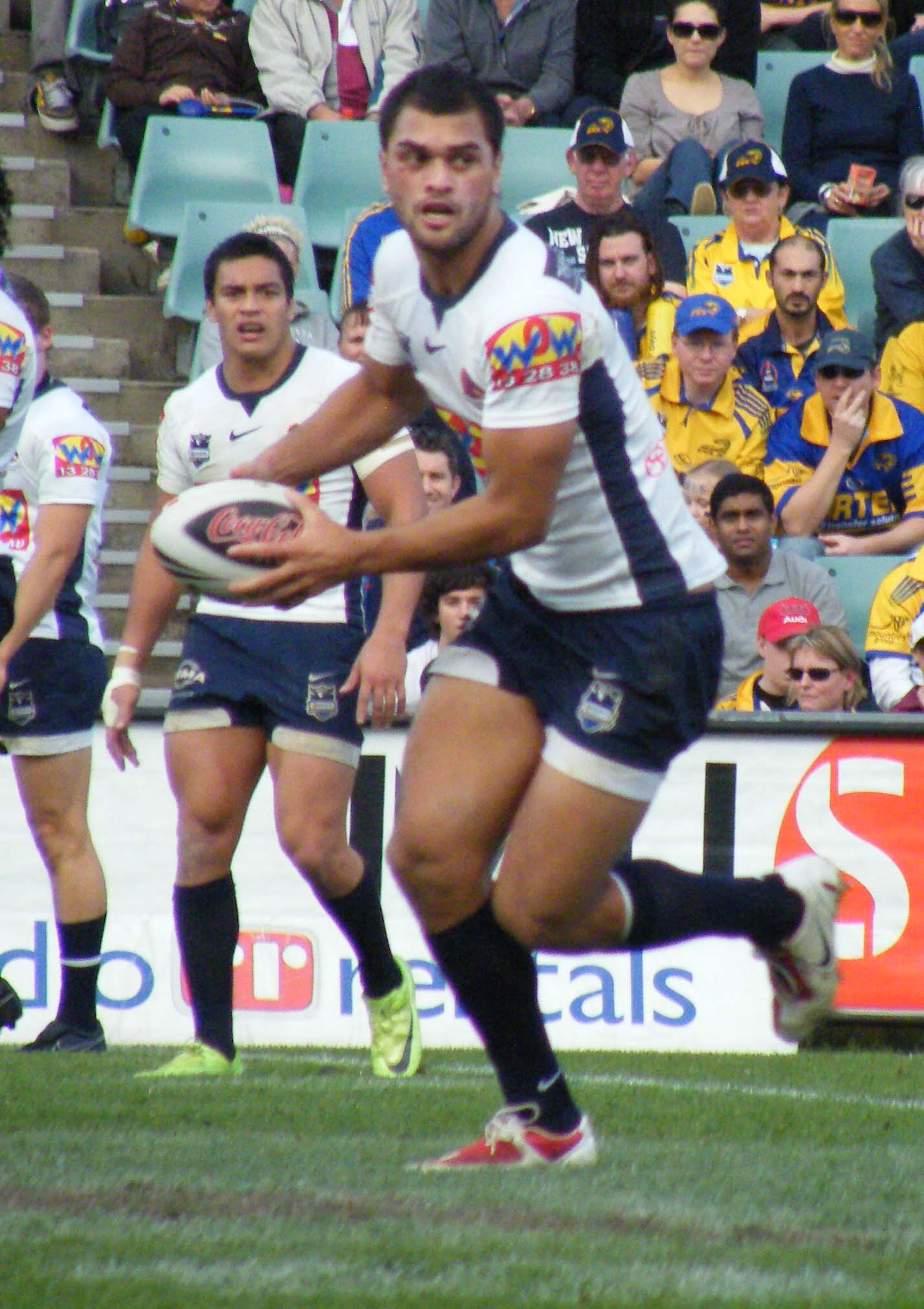
Hunt in 2009

In the final round of the 2008 NRL competition, Hunt became the youngest player in premiership's history to reach 100 first-grade games. He set up three tries and scored one himself in the man-of-the-match performance against the Newcastle Knights in the game which secured the Broncos place in the competition finals. This performance came a day after his coach Wayne Bennett stated that Hunt was the "bravest" player he had coached because of the strong runs he made when returning the ball from fullback.

On 15 September 2008, a 24-year-old woman lodged a formal complaint about a sexual assault that allegedly occurred two days earlier. The people alleged to be at the centre of the incident were Hunt and Brisbane Broncos teammates Darius Boyd and Sam Thaiday. The players cooperated with police and the three were cleared of the allegations in November by police. Hunt later said he was ashamed and felt he let down his family, fans and the Broncos. However, in May 2009, the woman stated she had a few drinks with Hunt, went into a toilet cubicle, and "after a few kisses, things went drastically wrong" and that in a "blink of an eye" Boyd and Thaiday were also in the cubicle.

==== 2009 ====
In March 2009 it was revealed the Broncos had withdrawn their contract extension offer to Hunt believed to be worth $1 million over three years. Hunt later revealed contract talks held with then Broncos CEO Bruno Cullen and Broncos coach Ivan Henjak in March 2009 were what turned him away from re-signing with the club. On 11 June 2009, tests confirmed Hunt tested positive to the swine flu influenza, and despite this, played in a 12 June 2009 game against the Bulldogs, despite health advice stating people with the influenza should remain isolated. Hunt's final game for the Broncos was the loss to Melbourne in the 2009 Grand Final qualifier.

=== Return to Rugby League ===
==== 2021 ====
On 8 February 2021, after 12 years away from the sport, Hunt returned to rugby league, signing with the Souths Logan Magpies in the Queensland Cup. Hunt expressed his desire to return to play for the Brisbane Broncos or another NRL club, and there were reports on 15 April 2021 that he had signed on for a train and trial contract with the Brisbane club.

On 8 June 2021, Hunt was named to start at five-eighth for Brisbane's game against the Canberra Raiders. Hunt made his return in the round 14 match which Brisbane lost 38–16 at GIO Stadium.

=== Statistics ===
Season	Team	Games	Tries	Goals	F/G	Points
2004	Brisbane Broncos	26	15	–	–	60
2005	Brisbane Broncos	25	8	–	–	32
2006	Brisbane Broncos	17	7	–	–	28
2007	Brisbane Broncos	14	8	–	–	32
2008	Brisbane Broncos	20	4	–	1	17
2009	Brisbane Broncos	23	11	–	–	44
2021	Brisbane Broncos	2	0	–	–	0
Total		127	53	–	1	213

== Representative rugby league career ==
=== Allegiance and debut ===
In his debut season in 2004, Hunt was approached to play at international level for New Zealand in the ANZAC Test match. Although he was born in New Zealand, he had played all of his rugby league in Queensland, Australia. He was therefore eligible to play for either New Zealand or Australia, and he could have also played for the Cook Islands or Samoa due to his parents' heritage. However, Hunt pledged his allegiance to Queensland, and therefore Australia, but was not selected for either country that season. Hunt became a possibility for the Australian squad for the 2004 Tri-Nations, but Bennett, who was the Australian coach, decided not to select him due to his inexperience. In 2006, media speculation suggested that Hunt intended to change his allegiance and play for the New Zealand team, but Hunt put the speculation to rest by confirming that he would play for Australia.

Though Hunt was considered for the 2004 State of Origin series among other fullbacks, he was ignored for the entire series in favour of Penrith Panthers fullback Rhys Wesser. Hunt's good form in 2006 paid off when he was selected to play for the Australian team against New Zealand on 5 May as a replacement for the injured Anthony Minichiello. This decision proved controversial, due to his being preferred over the in-form Matt Bowen. That game was Hunt's representative and international debut, and though he performed well, he only played for 50 minutes, making one error and 83 metres in kick returns. However, he was unable to complete the game due to concussion sustained by a blow from Frank Pritchard. He was taken unconscious from the field and played no further part in the match.

After his Test debut, Hunt was expected to be the Queensland fullback in the first match of the three game State of Origin series. However, Queensland selectors decided to stay with incumbent Origin fullback Matt Bowen. The selectors reconsidered after Queensland lost the first game, selecting Hunt for the second match. In his State of Origin debut, Hunt ran with the ball seventeen times, making 196 metres. He missed the third Origin game because of a foot injury, sustained in the Broncos' Round 15 match, and was replaced by Clinton Schifcofske.

=== 2006 Tri-Nations to 2008 ===
Hunt was one of eight Broncos players selected for the Australian team for the end of year Tri-Nations series. With the absence of injured rival Anthony Minichiello, Hunt retained his fullback position for the first Tri-Nations match, scoring two tries in a man of the match performance. He played in the remainder of the Tri-Nations series, which Australia won, Hunt scoring a total of three tries. The Tri-Nations win ended a good year for Hunt, who made his debut for Australia and Queensland before being a part of the premiership-winning Broncos team.

Hunt retained his fullback position for Australia in the 2007 ANZAC Test. Hunt ran the ball 18 times, the most of any player, and scored one try in a man-of-the-match performance as Australia won 30–6. Hunt was named fullback for all three games of the 2007 State of Origin series, despite the club form of rival fullbacks Billy Slater and Matt Bowen. In the second game, Hunt played a full match despite aggravating his foot injury as Queensland won the match and the series. He also played in the third Origin game despite suffering a calf injury during training. Hunt was not considered for selection in the end of year Test for Australia against New Zealand due to a hamstring injury sustained earlier in the season.

A minor knee injury which only left Hunt out for two weeks was enough to deny him the opportunity to regain the fullback position for Australia in the Centenary Test against New Zealand in May 2008. Hunt's place in the Queensland team for the 2008 State of Origin series was assured by Queensland coach Mal Meninga but there was speculation that Hunt could play five-eighth in place of injured teammate Darren Lockyer. While not the best five-eighth possibility for the Queensland representative team, his selection there would make way for the Australian fullback Billy Slater. Hunt, having never played a senior rugby league game at five-eighth, was controversially selected at the position for Queensland instead of the in-form Scott Prince.

In a losing Queensland team, Hunt played neither well nor badly, being outstanding in defence but subdued in attack. As a result, Hunt's position at five-eighth was in question for the second game, but coach Mal Meninga stated that Hunt would remain in the team. Hunt was named on the interchange bench for the second game, making way for Queensland custodian and captain Lockyer in the five-eighth role. However, Meninga made a late change before the game, starting Hunt at fullback and moving Slater to the interchange bench. Hunt played in the match, which Queensland won 30–0, for only 51 minutes, being put on the interchange bench for 29 minutes in the middle part of the game. He retained his starting position for game three, which Queensland won to take the series.

=== 2008 Rugby League World Cup and beyond ===
In August 2008, Hunt was named in the preliminary 46-man squad for Australia in the 2008 Rugby League World Cup. However he did not make the final 24-man squad because of 2008 grand final fullbacks Billy Slater and Brett Stewart who were selected ahead of Hunt. However Hunt was later called into the 24-man squad after Stewart was ruled out with injury. Hunt wasn't picked for the first match, with Slater picked ahead of him, however in the match, interchange player Kurt Gidley sustained an injury which subsequently led to Hunt being picked on the interchange bench for the second match. In the third regulation match, with a semi-final berth assured, coach Ricky Stuart choose to rest many of his regular players, including Slater, for the match. Hunt would play fullback for this match, and was moved back to the interchange bench for the semi-final and the final of the World Cup which Australia lost.

In April 2009, he was named in the preliminary 25 man squad to represent Queensland in the opening State of Origin match for 2009 and was subsequently picked on the interchange bench for the opening State of Origin match on 3 June. Hunt came on in the 25th minute of the game to replace the injured Justin Hodges and played in his centre position for the remainder of the match which Queensland won. The consequences of this game would be felt as part of the 2009 swine flu pandemic in Australia. Hunt's Queensland teammate Ben Hannant tested positive to the Swine influenza and the Brisbane Broncos subsequently put all of their Origin players in quarantine.

== Change of sports ==
On 29 July 2009, Hunt signed a deal to switch codes and play Australian rules football for the newly formed Gold Coast Football Club which had joined the Australian Football League (AFL) in the 2011 season. The deal, reputed to be worth over $3 million, was subsidised by the AFL and included a substantial component of AFL development and promotional responsibility. The move generated significant controversy in both the NRL and the AFL and received international media coverage.

On 17 October 2009, it was revealed that Hunt had agreed to play for the French professional rugby union team Biarritz Olympique based in Biarritz, Aquitaine. Hunt played in the Top 14 French club competition and the European Heineken Cup. The six-month deal was arranged by his manager, David Riolo, after the previous deal fell through. He returned to Australia in May 2010 to begin his contract with the Gold Coast Suns.

At the commencement of his AFL contract in 2010, Hunt became one of only three AFL players to have earned over a million a year, the others being Jonathan Brown and Chris Judd. He is the first player to appear in the senior grade of both the NRL and the AFL (or their historical equivalents).

Before his AFL career had begun, Hunt featured in television commercials for Swisse Vitamins introduced as a Gold Coast AFL player.

The AFL's experiment was largely derided by AFL personalities throughout Hunt's early Australian rules career. Wayne Carey is quoted to have said that "I just think he's really going to struggle. I'm just not sure a rugby player - as good as he is - can do it." Tony Shaw was quoted in 2011 to have said "he just cannot play the game naturally and it won't work. Just say to him, 'Take your money, you've been fantastic for us', maybe see the year out, but I wouldn't be playing him very often any more." Paul Roos is quoted to have said that "a player of Karmichael Hunt's current ability would probably be worth only $100,000 in the AFL". = Jason Akermanis is quoted to have said in reference to both Hunt and Israel Folau – who converted from rugby league to Australian rules football the year after Hunt – that "if they can't run and they can't handball - and we're only talking basics like kick, run, chase, handball and get body-to-body collisions – and can't get up to speed it's going to be such a waste of time and money."

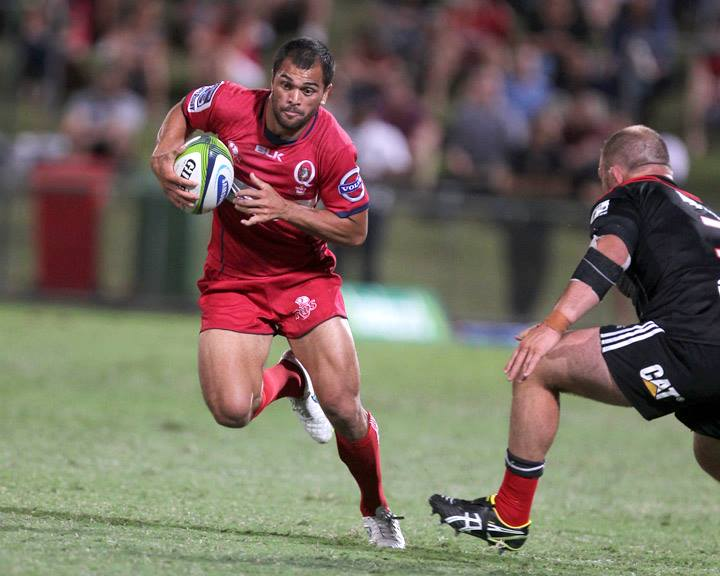
Hunt playing for the Queensland Reds

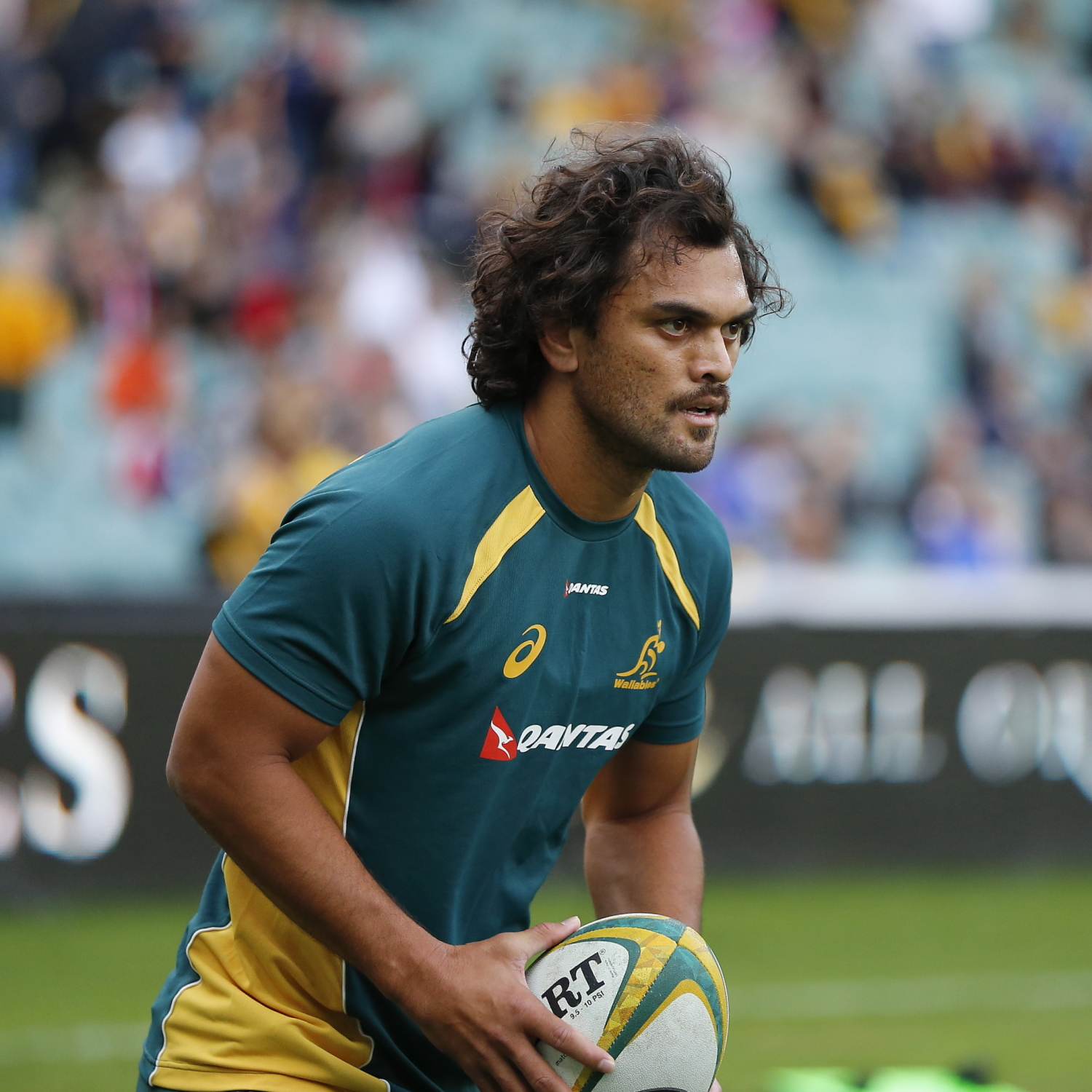
Hunt training for the Wallabies against Scotland

== Rugby Union career ==
=== Biarritz Olympique (2009–2010) ===
Despite never playing the sport professionally, Hunt made his rugby union debut for the French Barbarians in Brussels, Belgium on 14 November 2009. He would be selected at the outside centre position in the Barbarians' 39–26 victory. Hunt made his debut for Biarritz on 21 November 2009 against Clermont. While competing in the Top 14 for Biarritz the team also competed in the 2009–10 Heineken Cup. After topping their group Biarritz would record victories over Welsh team Ospreys and Irish team Munster to reach the 2010 Heineken Cup Final. Hunt would score the only try in the final held at Stade de France in front of 78,962 fans. This would be his last game for Biarritz on 22 May 2010 in the team's 21–19 loss.

=== Queensland Reds (2015–2018) ===
In August 2014, Hunt joined the Queensland Reds on a three-year contract (starting from 2015), with the Reds paying between $600,000 and $700,000 to secure his signature. Hunt's signing coincided with the signing of Wallaby James O'Connor from French Top 14 side Toulon.

On 16 January 2015, Hunt, along with teammate Rob Simmons, were appointed vice-captains of the Queensland Reds.

Hunt had an outstanding 2017 season. He was then rewarded with a selection in the Wallabies squad for the upcoming June Tests.

In 2018, Hunt had a disappointing year. He didn't feature in any games for the Reds due to drug possession where he was fined $10,000 and Reds coach Brad Thorn dropped him from the Super Rugby Squad, despite copping a four-game suspension and being cleared to return to playing by Rugby Australia. He instead played club rugby for Souths. He went on to play in the NRC for Brisbane City.

Despite contracted for the 2019 season with the Reds, Hunt was released from the final year of his contract and he was given an opportunity to continue his rugby playing career with the NSW Waratahs for the 2019 Super Rugby Season.

=== New South Wales Waratahs (2019-2020) ===
On 21 January, it was announced that Hunt had signed a one-year contract with the New South Wales Waratahs.

=== International ===
In 2016, Hunt was named in Australia's preliminary 39-man squad for the 2016 series against England. However, he didn't play a test game in 2016 due to injury and had to wait until 2017 to make his international test debut.

Hunt made his debut for the Wallabies on 10 June 2017 in the 37–14 win over Fiji at AAMI Park in Melbourne, playing at 12 and alongside his former Brisbane Broncos NRL team-mate Israel Folau (who was playing at Fullback). He went on to play in the next 2 home-tests starting at 12 against Scotland (at Allianz Stadium in Sydney) and Italy (at Suncorp Stadium in Brisbane). Despite not featuring in the Rugby Championship due to injury; he returned to the squad for the Europe Tour games against Wales, England and Scotland where he started from the bench for the final 3 tests of the year (with Kurtley Beale starting at 15 and Samu Kerevi starting at 12).

== Australian rules football career ==
=== Gold Coast Football Club (2010–2014) ===
==== Victorian Football League (2010) ====
On 12 June 2010, Hunt played his first Australian rules football match for Victorian Football League team the Gold Coast in their heavy loss against the Coburg Tigers at the Highgate Recreation Reserve in Craigieburn, Victoria. Playing at full-forward Hunt had three shots at goal in the first quarter, two from free kicks. Hunt kicked two goals in quick succession after he was awarded a free kick for a late push from an opponent after his running goal in the goalsquare. After this he was quiet with few possessions and left the field with cramp in the third quarter.

In his second match against Frankston Football Club on 26 June 2010, Hunt was tried as a defender, playing fullback on a taller, heavier opponent. He drew some criticism for not getting any kicks and for an inability to read the play, however running a total around 8 kilometres (5 mi) during the game on and off the bench Hunt managed just a handful of possessions and tackles in his side's convincing win.

Hunt's coaching staff have speculated him to make an experimental shift into the midfield (as centreman or ruck rover), however he was again selected at fullback for the match against the Box Hill Hawks. In the match Hunt had just three kicks, three handpasses and two marks before straining his groin in the final minutes and missed following games through injury.

In Cairns, Hunt had a breakthrough game against the Bendigo Bombers showing dramatic improvement. He followed the good form being named in the Gold Coast's best backman against the Sandringham Football Club, again playing in defence showing good run and carry skills with 15 disposals.

==== Australian Football League (2011–2014) ====
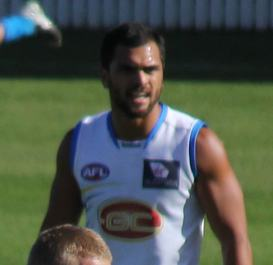
Hunt playing for Gold Coast against Greater Western Sydney in May 2012

Hunt's Australian Football League pre-season competition debut was at Blacktown ISP Oval on 19 February 2011 in front of a crowd of 9,447 people. Playing at fullback, he was named among the side's best in the three point win against the Sydney Swans while playing on dual Brownlow Medallist Adam Goodes. In each of his two first pre-season matches, the second against the Greater Western Sydney Giants, his performance statistics were consistent at six possessions and a tackle.

His first official AFL game was in the Suns' debut match in round two of the 2011 season against Carlton. He kicked his first AFL goal on 28 May 2011 against Geelong at Metricon Stadium. In the same match, however, he earned a one-week suspension for head-high contact to Geelong's Nathan Vardy.

Hunt's promising first season was rewarded by being named on the half-back flank in the Courier Mail 2011 Queensland Team of the Year. He followed this up by winning Gold Coast's inaugural Most Improved Player Award at the club's best and fairest awards on 9 September 2011.

On 5 March 2012, Hunt re-signed with the Gold Coast until 2014, continuing his AFL ambassador role, expressing ambitions to become a midfielder. He was elevated to the Gold Coast's leadership group.

He began his second season solidly, ranking among the three best Gold Coast players in terms of clearances in round 3 against Essendon. Hunt had 16 disposals during the match, and received press notice for a "crunching tackle" of Angus Monfries.

Anyone who has criticised Karmichael Hunt over the journey should be eating their words and should be apologizing to him because, on that performance, he's a bona fide AFL midfielder.

— North Melbourne coach Brad Scott at press conference following the round 5 match against the Gold Coast

In round 4 Hunt had a 20-possession display against Brisbane. In the following match against North Melbourne, he had 16 disposals, prompting North Melbourne coach Brad Scott to comment that "Anyone who has criticised Karmichael Hunt over the journey should be eating their words and should be apologizing to him because, on that performance, he's a bona fide AFL midfielder". Hunt continued to contribute to his side with a 22-disposal display against Fremantle in round 6 that included a goal. Going into round 7, Greater Western Sydney coach Kevin Sheedy commented that the in form Hunt, rather than star player Ablett was the key threat in the match and would assign defensive taggers to him. Despite another consistent 16 disposal game, Hunt struggled to break the tag and some media commentators suggested that he had been outperformed by fellow league to Aussie Rules convert Israel Folau.

At Cazaly's Stadium in Cairns in front of 10,961 against Richmond in round 16, Hunt broke the club's losing drought with an after siren goal in a two-goal performance which again put him in the club's best. Following the conclusion of his second season Hunt was again named in the Courier Mail Queensland Team of the Year for 2012, this time being named at half forward flank.

Hunt's final two years in the AFL were plagued with injury, with Hunt playing just 9 games in 2013, and just 1 game in 2014. In August 2014, Hunt announced that he would be leaving the AFL to return to rugby. A short time later, he signed with Australian Super Rugby team Queensland Reds.

Hunt's 4-year stint in the AFL received mixed reviews, with praise particularly coming from his club, while it was criticised as "an ill-advised, ill-fated experiment" by former AFL player and coach Leigh Matthews.

=== Statistics ===
Legend
G	Goals	K	Kicks	D	Disposals	T	Tackles
B	Behinds	H	Handballs	M	Marks

Season	Team	No.	Games	Totals							Averages (per game)						
Season	Team	No.	Games	G	B	K	H	D	M	T	G	B	K	H	D	M	T
2011	Gold Coast	7	16	1	1	51	81	132	29	27	0.06	0.06	3.19	5.06	8.25	1.81	1.69
2012	Gold Coast	7	18	3	3	84	180	264	37	63	0.17	0.17	4.67	10.00	14.67	2.06	3.50
2013	Gold Coast	7	9	2	2	36	50	86	21	29	0.22	0.22	4.00	5.56	9.56	2.33	3.22
2014	Gold Coast	7	1	0	0	2	6	8	0	2	0.00	0.00	2.00	6.00	8.00	0.00	2.00
AFL Career			44	6	6	173	317	490	87	121	0.14	0.14	3.93	7.20	11.14	1.98	2.75

== Honours ==
Awards
Preceded by Matt Utai (Bulldogs)	Dally M Rookie of the Year; 2004	Succeeded by Tim Smith (Parramatta Eels)
Preceded by Neville Costigan	Brisbane Broncos Rookie of the Year; 2004	Succeeded by Leon Bott
Preceded by Darren Lockyer	Brisbane Broncos Back of the Year; 2007–2008	Succeeded by Justin Hodges
Preceded by Sam Thaiday	Brisbane Broncos Player's Player; 2009	Succeeded by Josh Hoffman
Preceded by Inaugural	Gold Coast Suns' Most Improved Player; 2011	Succeeded by Harley Bennell
Records
Brisbane Broncos Youngest Ever Player; 17 years, 118 days
Youngest Ever NRL Player to reach 100 first grade games 21 years, 293 days
Brisbane Broncos Most Tries in a match Steve Renouf, Wendell Sailor, Justin Hodges, Denan Kemp and Israel Folau
Preceded by Michael De Vere	Brisbane Broncos top try-scorer 2004 (15 Tries)	Succeeded by Shaun Berrigan
First Gold Coast Suns player to kick a winning goal after the siren Round 16, 2012 v Richmond Tigers
