= 2006 NRL Grand Final =

Australian rugby league championship match

Melbourne Storm	Brisbane Broncos
8	15
	1	2	Total
MEL	4	4	8
BRI	8	7	15
- Date: 1 October 2006
- Stadium: Telstra Stadium
- Location: Sydney, New South Wales
- Clive Churchill Medal: Shaun Berrigan (BRI)
- National anthem: Jade MacRae
- Referee: Paul Simpkins
- Attendance: 79,609

Broadcast partners
- Broadcasters: Nine Network
- Commentators: Ray Warren; Peter Sterling; Phil Gould; Andrew Voss (sideline); Ben Ikin & Matthew Johns (sideline)

The 2006 NRL Grand Final was the conclusive and premiership-deciding match of the NRL's 2006 Telstra Premiership season. It was played between the first-placed Melbourne Storm and the third-placed Brisbane Broncos clubs on the night of Sunday, 1 October. The 2006 grand final was the first ever to feature teams which were both from cities outside the borders of New South Wales, in this case the capitals of Queensland and Victoria, yet was played at the traditional venue of Sydney's Telstra Stadium. It was the first time the two sides had met in a grand final. They had played each other twice during the 2006 regular season, with Melbourne winning both times. The Melbourne side went into the grand final as heavy favorites, having won the minor premiership (although this was later discounted when salary cap breaches at the club were exposed in 2010). Both teams were looking to keep their perfect grand final records intact: Brisbane with 5/5 and the Melbourne side with 1/1 heading into the game.

== Background ==
The 2006 NRL season was the 99th season of professional rugby league football in Australia and the ninth run by the National Rugby League. Fifteen clubs competed for the 2006 Telstra Premiership over the 26 rounds of the regular season. Eight of these teams qualified for the four-week finals series.

=== Brisbane Broncos ===
The 2006 Brisbane Broncos season was the nineteenth in the club's history. Coached by Wayne Bennett and captained by Darren Lockyer, they finished the regular season in third place before going on to reach their sixth grand final.

=== Melbourne Storm ===
The 2006 Melbourne Storm season was the 9th in the club's history. Coached by Craig Bellamy and captained by Cameron Smith, they won a record 20 out of 24 regular season games to finish in first place and win the minor premiership, eight points clear of the second-placed Canterbury. The Melbourne club then reached their second grand final as favorites.

== Teams ==
Matt Geyer was the only remaining Melbourne Storm player from their 1999 premiership winning team and the only person at the club with grand final experience. Scott Hill (who had missed the 1999 grand final with injury) was playing his 200th and final game in the NRL. By contrast, around half of the Brisbane Broncos players had premiership rings, most of them from the club's 1998 and 2000 grand final wins, while Justin Hodges was the only player in the Broncos squad that had won elsewhere, being part of the Sydney Roosters' 2002 premiership team. It was to be the last rugby league match for Broncos veteran Shane Webcke before retirement.

Team details
Melbourne Storm		Position	Brisbane Broncos
Name	Number	Position	Number	Name
Billy Slater	1	Fullback	1	Justin Hodges
Matt Geyer	2	Wing	2	Darius Boyd
Matt King	3	Centre	3	Brent Tate
Greg Inglis	4	Centre	4	David Stagg
Steve Turner	5	Wing	5	Karmichael Hunt
Scott Hill	6	Five eighth	6	Darren Lockyer (c)
Cooper Cronk	7	Half back	7	Shane Perry
Antonio Kaufusi	8	Prop forward	8	Shane Webcke
Cameron Smith (c)	9	Hooker	9	Shaun Berrigan
Brett White	10	Prop forward	10	Petero Civoniceva
David Kidwell	11	Second row	11	Sam Thaiday
Ryan Hoffman	12	Second row	12	Brad Thorn
Dallas Johnson	13	Lock forward	13	Tonie Carroll
Adam Blair	14	Interchange	14	Corey Parker
Jeremy Smith	15	Interchange	15	Dane Carlaw
Ben Cross	16	Interchange	16	Ben Hannant
Nathan Friend	17	Interchange	17	Casey McGuire
Craig Bellamy		Coach		Wayne Bennett
RLP

== Match details ==
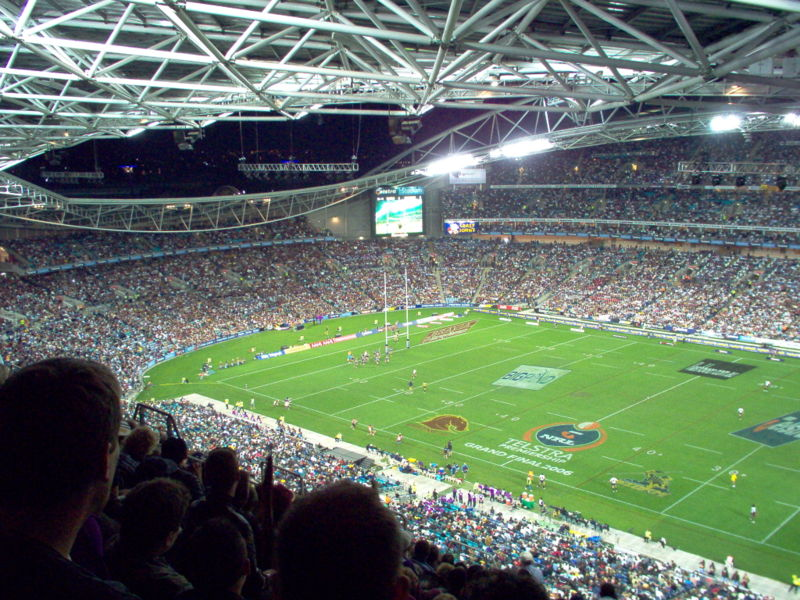
View of the 2006 grand final from the stands of Stadium Australia.

A crowd of 79,609 people turned out, with Hoodoo Gurus and INXS performing before the match.

Referee Paul Simpkins was chosen to officiate his first NRL grand final, with Bill Harrigan the video referee.

=== 1st Half ===
The first points of the match came from a penalty in the ninth minute. Brisbane's Shaun Berrigan, playing at hooker, tried to burrow over Melbourne's try-line from dummy half but was ruled to have had the ball taken from his arms by Billy Slater in a two-man tackle. The resulting penalty kick by captain Darren Lockyer in front of the posts was a gift two points for the Brisbane side to take an early 2–0 lead. Three minutes later, Melbourne halfback Cooper Cronk kicked a 40/20 coming out of his side's territory. Following the subsequent scrum in an attacking position, the Melbourne side raided Brisbane's line and got the first try of the match. Scott Hill did well to evade a few attempted tackles and shoot a remarkable pass around the back of a Brisbane defender and into the arms of winger Steve Turner who dived over out wide. Cameron Smith missed the conversion, leaving the score at 4–2. Brisbane then got a scrum of their own close to Melbourne's line after Turner knocked on trying to take a Lockyer bomb. Lockyer, moving across-field fed the ball back inside to Justin Hodges who went over untouched to put the ball down near the posts, affording the Brisbane captain another easy kick. No more points were scored in the first half and Brisbane went into the break with an 8–4 lead. Darren Lockyer was limping around in the dressing room but went on to play through the rest of the game.

=== 2nd Half ===
Eight minutes into the second half, a high tackle by Justin Hodges on Cameron Smith close to Brisbane's line resulted in a minor scuffle and a penalty to the Melbourne side. Melbourne captain Smith decided to take the tap and attack Brisbane's line and a close-range try to Matt King resulted. The scores were then level at 8-all, with the kick to come. Smith, also Melbourne's first-choice goal-kicker, was having a problem with his kicking leg so the task fell onto Matt Geyer whose conversion attempt went wide. Ten minutes later a penalty was awarded to the Broncos after a high shot from Billy Slater on Shaun Berrigan and Corey Parker's kick was successful, giving his side a two-point lead at 10–8. Following the restart kick from Melbourne, Brisbane were working the ball out of their own half and on the fifth tackle scored a brilliant grand final try. From dummy half Berrigan ran then passed back inside to Lockyer who gave a short ball on to Parker who did likewise for Casey McGuire. Before being tackled McGuire tossed the ball blindly back over his head and it was picked up by Lockyer who spun out of a tackle then passed it to Tonie Carroll. Without losing momentum, Carroll passed the ball on to a flying Brent Tate who raced to the corner for the try. The conversion attempt from near the sideline was missed by Parker so the Brisbane side led by six with seventeen minutes of play remaining. A couple of minutes later Melbourne appeared to have scored their third try when a bomb by Cronk was leapt for but unsuccessfully taken by both a Brisbane and a Melbourne player. On its way down the ball was snatched from the air by King who looked to have put it down for his second try but the video referee ruled that the ball had gone forward off the Storm so it was disallowed. In the seventy-third minute, after a strong run by prop Shane Webcke (the oldest player on the field) put him in good field position, Lockyer snapped away a successful field goal. This gave Brisbane a 7-point buffer. A frustrated Melbourne side were unable to score in the remaining minutes as Brisbane ground their way towards full-time, the score 15–8 at the final siren.

=== Post-match ===
Brisbane's Shaun Berrigan, playing in his new role as hooker, received the Clive Churchill Medal for man-of-the-match. His dummy half raids and effective defence were seen as instrumental in his team's victory.

Brisbane's victory was the club's sixth premiership in their 19 seasons and it broke what was at the time their longest premiership drought (five years). They suffered 11 losses during the season (including those to non-finals teams the Cowboys (twice), Wests Tigers and the wooden spooners, South Sydney), the most ever by a premiership-winning team. The win also enabled Brisbane to maintain their 100% victory record in grand finals, making it six from six. This also made Wayne Bennett the most successful Australian rugby league club coach of all time in terms of premierships won. In addition the grand final victory provided the perfect farewell for retiring Broncos prop-forward Shane Webcke, who left the playing field with a grand final victory in his final match. Also departing the NRL were Casey McGuire and Scott Hill, both bound for the Super League.

2006's grand final set a new record for the second highest ever television audience in Australia for a rugby league match since the introduction of the OzTam ratings system in 2001, behind only the previous season's grand final. Melbourne's television audience for the match was higher than Sydney's.

The two teams would meet again in the 2025 NRL Grand Final.

== Match summary ==
2006 NRL Grand Final

Sunday, 1 October
19:00 AEST (UTC+10)

Melbourne Storm	8 – 15	Brisbane Broncos
Tries: 2 Turner 14'; King 49'; Goals: C Smith (0/1); Geyer (0/1)	1st: 4–8; 2nd: 4–7; Report	Tries: 2 Hodges 19'; Tate 62'; Goals: 3 Lockyer pen 9', 20' (2/2); Parker pen 60' (1/2); Field goals: 1 Lockyer 73'

Telstra Stadium, Sydney
Attendance: 79,609
Referee: Paul Simpkins
Video referee: Bill Harrigan
Touch judges: Rod Lawrence, Steve Carrall
Clive Churchill Medal: Shaun Berrigan (Brisbane)

== 2007 World Club Challenge ==
Having won the NRL grand final, the Brisbane Broncos had earned the right to play against 2006's Super League XI Champions, St. Helens in the following February's World Club Challenge. St Helens won 18–14.

== See also ==
- 2006 NRL season results
