= 2006 NRL season results =

The 2006 National Rugby League season consisted of 25 weekly regular season rounds starting on 11 March, followed by four weeks of play-offs that culminated in a grand final on 1 October.

== Regular season ==
=== Round 1 ===
Home	Score	Away	Match information
Home	Score	Away	Date and time	Venue	Referee	Crowd
Wests Tigers	24-15	St. George Illawarra Dragons	11 March 2006 7:30 pm	Telstra Stadium	P. Simpkins	27,865
Newcastle Knights	25-6	Parramatta Eels	12 March 2006 5:30 pm	Energy Australia Stadium	R. Smith	26,198
Canterbury Bulldogs	22-24	Penrith Panthers	12 March 2006 7:30 pm	Telstra Stadium	S. Hampstead	17,510
Manly Warringah Sea Eagles	14-27	Canberra Raiders	12 March 2006 7:30 pm	Brookvale Oval	S. Hayne	17,135
New Zealand Warriors	16-22	Melbourne Storm	13 March 2006 2:00 pm	Ericsson Stadium	S. Clark	10,031
Brisbane Broncos	4-36	North Queensland Cowboys	13 March 2006 2:00 pm	Suncorp Stadium	T. Archer	46,229
South Sydney Rabbitohs	22-40	Sydney Roosters	13 March 2006 2:30 pm	Telstra Stadium	J. Robinson	16,741
Cronulla Sharks	Bye

=== Round 2 ===
- Many records were broken in this round. The Cowboy's Matt Sing scores his 150th try in first-grade, the sixth player to do so. Canterbury's Hazem El Masri scored 34 points, a club record.
- The extremely hot conditions on the Sunday afternoon of this round affected two games in particular. In Wollongong, a slow-moving, somewhat sloppy game saw St George Illawarra in their first ever period of golden point extra time, going down to Penrith 13-12. On the other hand, at Canberra, an all-time premiership record 102 points were scored between Newcastle and Canberra. This surpasses the previous record of 97 points scored in St. George's 91-6 defeat of Canterbury in 1935.

Home	Score	Away	Match information
Home	Score	Away	Date and time	Venue	Referee	Crowd
Canterbury Bulldogs	47-12	Wests Tigers	18 March 2006 7:30 pm	Telstra Stadium	Stephen Clark	32,578
New Zealand Warriors	14-22	Parramatta Eels	19 March 2006 5:30 pm	Ericsson Stadium	Sean Hampstead	16,089
Cronulla Sharks	12-16	Brisbane Broncos	19 March 2006 7:30 pm	Toyota Park	Russell Smith	14,221
North Queensland Cowboys	20-16	Manly Warringah Sea Eagles	19 March 2006 7:30 pm	Dairy Farmers Stadium	Paul Simpkins	23,296
Sydney Roosters	18-22	Melbourne Storm	20 March 2006 2:00 pm	Sydney Football Stadium	Tony Archer	10,841
St. George Illawarra Dragons	12-13	Penrith Panthers	20 March 2006 3:00 pm	WIN Stadium	Shayne Hayne	12,098
Canberra Raiders	32-70	Newcastle Knights	20 March 2006 2:30 pm	Canberra Stadium	Jason Robinson	11,606
South Sydney Rabbitohs	Bye

=== Round 3 ===
- The Newcastle Knights scored 116 points in the last two weeks with a 46-22 win over the Canterbury Bulldogs
- The Brisbane Broncos won their first back to back wins since rounds 18 and 19 of the previous season.
- The Raiders conceded 126 points in their last two games after a 56-20 loss to the Roosters.

Home	Score	Away	Match information
Home	Score	Away	Date and time	Venue	Referee	Crowd
Newcastle Knights	46-22	Canterbury Bulldogs	24 March 2006 7:30 pm	EnergyAustralia Stadium	Steve Clark	25,504
New Zealand Warriors	26-10	Wests Tigers	25 March 2006 5:30 pm	Jade Stadium	Russel Smith	21,346
Manly Warringah Sea Eagles	20-18	Cronulla Sharks	25 March 2006 7:30 pm	Brookvale Oval	Sean Hampstead	13,114
North Queensland Cowboys	40-8	Melbourne Storm	25 March 2006 7:30 pm	Dairy Farmers Stadium	Paul Simpkins	14,675
St. George Illawarra Dragons	44-14	South Sydney Rabbitohs	26 March 2006 2:00 pm	Telstra Stadium	Jason Robinson	16,049
Sydney Roosters	56-20	Canberra Raiders	26 March 2006 2:30 pm	Sydney Football Stadium	Shayne Hayne	9,826
Brisbane Broncos	30-10	Parramatta Eels	26 March 2006 3:00 pm	Suncorp Stadium	Tony Archer	25,525
Penrith Panthers	Bye

=== Round 4 ===
- Cronulla Sharks won their first game of the season win a 24-22 win over the South Sydney Rabbitohs
- The Panthers became the first team to play back to back Golden Point matches.

Home	Score	Away	Match information
Home	Score	Away	Date and time	Venue	Referee	Crowd
Parramatta Eels	18-26	North Queensland Cowboys	31 March 2006 7:30 pm	Parramatta Stadium	Paul Simpkins	14,131
Cronulla Sharks	24-22	South Sydney Rabbitohs	1 April 2006 5:30 pm	Toyota Park	Shayne Hayne	12,274
Manly Warringah Sea Eagles	30-22	Sydney Roosters	1 April 2006 7:30 pm	Brookvale Oval	Tony Archer	17,117
Canberra Raiders	21-20	Penrith Panthers	2 April 2006 7:30 pm	Canberra Stadium	Gavin Badger	9,399
Wests Tigers	30-28	Melbourne Storm	3 April 2006 2:00 pm	Leichhardt Oval	Jason Robinson	17,803
St. George Illawarra Dragons	26-12	Brisbane Broncos	3 April 2006 2:30 pm	WIN Stadium	Sean Hampstead	13,708
Newcastle Knights	22-26	New Zealand Warriors	3 April 2006 3:00 pm	EnergyAustralia Stadium	Russell Smith	18,359
Canterbury Bulldogs	Bye

=== Round 5 ===
- It was a Grand Final rematch between the North Queensland Cowboys and the Wests Tigers, this time the previous season's runners-up North Queensland taking the game 32-12.
- The Bulldogs became the first team to win after a Bye this year with a comprehensive 12-30 drubbing of the Raiders in Canberra

Home	Score	Away	Match information
Home	Score	Away	Date and time	Venue	Referee	Crowd
North Queensland Cowboys	32-12	Wests Tigers	7 April 2006 7:30 pm	Dairy Farmers Stadium	S. Clark	20,262
Brisbane Broncos	30-12	South Sydney Rabbitohs	8 April 2006 5:30 pm	Suncorp Stadium	G. Badger	20,816
Cronulla Sharks	24-28	Sydney Roosters	8 April 2006 7:30 pm	Toyota Park	S. Hampstead	12,331
St. George Illawarra Dragons	6-54	Newcastle Knights	8 April 2006 7:30 pm	WIN Stadium	T. Archer	17,367
New Zealand Warriors	8-22	Manly Warringah Sea Eagles	9 April 2006 2:00 pm	Ericsson Stadium	R. Smith	7,888
Canberra Raiders	12-30	Canterbury Bulldogs	9 April 2006 2:00 pm	Canberra Stadium	J. Robertson	12,125
Parramatta Eels	18-44	Penrith Panthers	9 April 2006 2:30 pm	Parramatta Stadium	S. Hayne	14,194
Melbourne Storm	Bye

=== Round 6 ===
A very rare event occurred in Round 6 – a referee was injured during a match. In the 28th minute of the Newcastle vs Nth Qld match, referee Paul Simpkins blew time off and made his way off the field with an injured calf muscle. A replacement referee was organised – Tony De Las Heras, who had refereed the Jersey Flegg (third-tier competition) match earlier, was brought onto the field to take control of the rest of the match. Coincidentally, De Las Heras was the subject of the next instance a referee was injured in an NRL match, in Round 19, 2009.

Also, for the first time in 8 years, first grade competitive rugby league returned to Adelaide after the Adelaide Rams were excluded from the competition after the 1998 season. The Penrith Panthers hosted the Melbourne Storm at Hindmarsh Stadium, which was won by Melbourne 40-18. However, Rugby league officials were hoping for an attendance of at least 10,000, and were disappointed with the attendance of only 7,017.

Home	Score	Away	Match information
Home	Score	Away	Date and time	Venue	Referee	Crowd
Sydney Roosters	6-24	Brisbane Broncos	14 April 2006 7:30 pm	Sydney Football Stadium	S. Clark	21,246
Manly Warringah Sea Eagles	24-26	St. George Illawarra Dragons	15 April 2006 5:30 pm	Brookvale Oval	S. Hayne	18,069
Canberra Raiders	18-14	New Zealand Warriors	15 April 2006 7:30 pm	Canberra Stadium	G. Badger	7,174
Penrith Panthers	18-40	Melbourne Storm	15 April 2006 7:30 pm	Hindmarsh Stadium	T. Archer	7,017
Wests Tigers	42-16	Cronulla Sharks	16 April 2006 2:00 pm	Campbelltown Stadium	J. Robinson	15,550
Newcastle Knights	16-18	North Queensland Cowboys	16 April 2006 2:00 pm	EnergyAustralia Stadium	P. Simpkins, Tom Les Das Heras	26,048
Canterbury Bulldogs	26-18	South Sydney Rabbitohs	17 April 2006 2:30 pm	Telstra Stadium	R. Smith	19,529
Parramatta Eels	Bye

=== Round 7 ===
Home	Score	Away	Match information
Home	Score	Away	Date and time	Venue	Referee	Crowd
Parramatta Eels	28-16	Wests Tigers	21 April 2006 7:30 pm	Parramatta Stadium	T. Archer	21,141
New Zealand Warriors	46-14	South Sydney Rabbitohs	22 April 2006 5:30 pm	Ericsson Stadium	J. Robinson	8,015
Cronulla Sharks	24-22	North Queensland Cowboys	22 April 2006 7:30 pm	Toyota Park	G. Badger	9,025
Melbourne Storm	52-6	Newcastle Knights	22 April 2006 7:30 pm	Olympic Park	R. Smith	9,084
Canterbury Bulldogs	14-40	Manly Warringah Sea Eagles	23 April 2006 2:00 pm	Telstra Stadium	S. Hampstead	13,621
Brisbane Broncos	30-6	Penrith Panthers	23 April 2006 3:00 pm	Suncorp Stadium	S. Hayne	25,133
St. George Illawarra Dragons	22-12	Sydney Roosters	25 April 2006 2:30 pm	Sydney Football Stadium	S. Clark	31,105
Canberra Raiders	Bye

=== Round 8 ===
Brisbane Broncos recorded their biggest comeback in the club's history when they came from 18-0 down at halftime to win 30-28 against the Canberra Raiders at Suncorp Stadium.

Home	Score	Away	Match information
Home	Score	Away	Date and time	Venue	Referee	Crowd
Cronulla Sharks	40-12	Penrith Panthers	28 April 2006 7:30 pm	Toyota Park	S. Hampstead	16,268
North Queensland Cowboys	18-22	Sydney Roosters	29 April 2006 5:30 pm	Dairy Farmers Stadium	S. Hayne	21,175
Melbourne Storm	24-10	St. George Illawarra Dragons	29 April 2006 7:30 pm	Olympic Park	T. Archer	8.694
Brisbane Broncos	30-28	Canberra Raiders	29 April 2006 7:30 pm	Suncorp Stadium	R. Smith	23,582
New Zealand Warriors	16-30	Canterbury Bulldogs	30 April 2006 12:00 pm	Ericsson Stadium	G. Badger	11,604
South Sydney Rabbitohs	18-24	Newcastle Knights	30 April 2006 2:00 pm	Telstra Stadium	J. Robinson	8,649
Manly Warringah Sea Eagles	23-22	Parramatta Eels	30 April 2006 3:00 pm	SCG	S. Clark	19,208
Wests Tigers	Bye

=== Round 9 ===
Home	Score	Away	Match information
Home	Score	Away	Date and time	Venue	Referee	Crowd
North Queensland Cowboys	22-6	Penrith Panthers	6 May 2006 5:30 pm	Dairy Farmers Stadium	Ben Cummins	16,808
South Sydney Rabbitohs	14-38	Melbourne Storm	6 May 2006 7:30 pm	Telstra Stadium	Gavin Badger	8,083
Parramatta Eels	10-30	Canberra Raiders	6 May 2006 7:30 pm	Parramatta Stadium	Jason Robinson	10,146
Cronulla Sharks	30-12	St. George Illawarra Dragons	7 May 2006 12:00 pm	Toyota Park	Stephen Clark	18,845
Wests Tigers	24-18	Manly Warringah Sea Eagles	7 May 2006 2:00 pm	Leichhardt Oval	Russell Smith	20,231
Newcastle Knights	32-30	Brisbane Broncos	7 May 2006 2:00 pm	EnergyAustralia Stadium	Tony Archer	21,252
Sydney Roosters	14-30	Canterbury Bulldogs	7 May 2006 3:00 pm	Sydney Football Stadium	Sean Hampstead	16,121
New Zealand Warriors	Bye

=== Round 10 ===
Home	Score	Away	Match information
Home	Score	Away	Date and time	Venue	Referee	Crowd
St George Illawarra Dragons	22-16	New Zealand Warriors	13 May 2006 5:30 pm	WIN Stadium	G. Badger	10,117
Melbourne Storm	18-6	North Queensland Cowboys	13 May 2006 7:30 pm	Olympic Park	S. Clark	10,830
Brisbane Broncos	32-10	Manly Warringah Sea Eagles	13 May 2006 7:30 pm	Suncorp Stadium	J. Robinson	24,991
Canterbury Bulldogs	22-18	Parramatta Eels	14 May 2006 2:30 pm	Telstra Stadium	S. Hayne	13,159
Penrith Panthers	32-20	South Sydney Rabbitohs	14 May 2006 3:00 pm	CUA Stadium	J. Maxwell	10,991
Wests Tigers	16-18	Newcastle Knights	14 May 2006 3:00 pm	Campbelltown Stadium	S. Hampstead	14,499
Canberra Raiders	28-38	Cronulla Sharks	14 May 2006 3:00 pm	Canberra Stadium	B. Cummins	9,695
Sydney Roosters	Bye

=== Round 11 ===
- Parramatta played their first game under stand-in coach Jason Taylor, following Brian Smith's resignation earlier in the week. Following this announcement, star Parramatta players Mark Riddell and Tim Smith were fined $5000 each and relegated to Premier League by Parramatta after turning up to Monday morning training intoxicated.
- All six home teams won their respective matches over the weekend.

Home	Score	Away	Match information
Home	Score	Away	Date and time	Venue	Referee	Crowd
Penrith Panthers	30-20	Parramatta Eels	19 May 2006 7:30 pm	CUA Stadium	S. Clark	16,764
New Zealand Warriors	34-12	Wests Tigers	20 May 2006 7:30 pm	Ericsson Stadium	J. Maxwell	8,210
Newcastle Knights	22-12	Canberra Raiders	20 May 2006 7:30 pm	Energy Australia Stadium	J. Robinson	18,236
Manly Warringah Sea Eagles	34-12	Melbourne Storm	20 May 2006 7:30 pm	Brookvale Oval	G. Badger	9,338
Canterbury Bulldogs	32-24	Cronulla Sharks	21 May 2006 2:30 pm	Telstra Stadium	T. Archer	12,728
Sydney Roosters	28-26	South Sydney Rabbitohs	21 May 2006 3:00 pm	Sydney Football Stadium	S. Hayne	13,221
Brisbane Broncos	Bye
St George Illawarra Dragons	Bye
North Queensland Cowboys	Bye

=== Round 12 ===
- Cronulla Sharks hooker Tevita Latu is stood down from the club on Monday 22 May after claims from 19-year-old Brooke Peninton that the player punched her in the face. After being arrested on late on Monday, he was granted police bail to face Sutherland Local Court on 15 June. He was later sacked by the Cronulla club and deregistered by the National Rugby League the following Wednesday.
- For just the 3rd time since its inception in 2003, there were 2 Golden Point games in the same round.

Home	Score	Away	Match information
Home	Score	Away	Date and time	Venue	Referee	Crowd
Newcastle Knights	12-38	St George Illawarra Dragons	26 May 2006 7:30 pm	Energy Australia Stadium	T. Archer	23,356
North Queensland Cowboys	14-15	Canberra Raiders	27 May 2006 5:30 pm	Dairy Farmers Stadium	G. Badger	16,971
Cronulla Sharks	34-20	New Zealand Warriors	27 May 2006 7:30 pm	Toyota Park	B. Cummins	9,490
Brisbane Broncos	25-6	Canterbury Bulldogs	27 May 2006 7:30 pm	Suncorp Stadium	S. Clark	30,589
Melbourne Storm	17-16	Penrith Panthers	28 May 2006 2:30 pm	Olympic Park	S. Hayne	7,899
South Sydney Rabbitohs	4-44	Wests Tigers	28 May 2006 3:00 pm	Telstra Stadium	P. Simpkins	13,640
Parramatta Eels	22-20	Sydney Roosters	28 May 2006 3:00 pm	Parramatta Stadium	S. Hampstead	13,044
Manly Warringah Sea Eagles	Bye

=== Round 13 ===
It took 70 minutes to score a point in the St. George Illawarra Dragons and Parramatta Eels game with Parramatta's five-eighth John Morris popped over a field goal to make it 1-0 to Parramatta. Eventually St. George Illwarra found their rhythm to go out 8-1 winners.

Home	Score	Away	Match information
Home	Score	Away	Date and time	Venue	Referee	Crowd
St George Illawarra Dragons	8-1	Parramatta Eels	2 June 2006 7:30 pm	Oki Jubilee Stadium	S. Hampstead	9,075
Melbourne Storm	20-16	Sydney Roosters	3 June 2006 5:30 pm	Olympic Park	B. Cummins	8,491
Canberra Raiders	24-22	South Sydney Rabbitohs	3 June 2006 7:30 pm	Canberra Stadium	J. Maxwell	10,150
Canterbury Bulldogs	38-22	Newcastle Knights	3 June 2006 7:30 pm	Telstra Stadium	P. Simpkins	12,658
New Zealand Warriors	18-23	Brisbane Broncos	4 June 2006 2:00 pm	Ericsson Stadium	S. Hayne	7,746
Penrith Panthers	22-29	Manly Warringah Sea Eagles	4 June 2006 2:30 pm	CUA Stadium	T. Archer	10,256
Wests Tigers	24-14	North Queensland Cowboys	4 June 2006 3:00 pm	Telstra Stadium	S. Clark	15,736
Cronulla Sharks	Bye

=== Round 14 ===
- The South Sydney Rabbitohs were able to record their first victory for the 2006 season, taking advantage of Brisbane's depleted line-up due to State of Origin commitments to prevail 34-14 at Telstra Stadium. A crowd of just 6,537, the smallest crowd to date in 2006, braved the cold, wet weather to witness this intriguing game. It was also the Rabbitohs' first victory over Brisbane in 17 years.

Home	Score	Away	Match information
Home	Score	Away	Date and time	Venue	Referee	Crowd
Manly Warringah Sea Eagles	16-12	Wests Tigers	9 June 2006 7:30 pm	Brookvale Oval	S. Hayne	11,588
Penrith Panthers	10-20	St George Illawarra Dragons	10 June 2006 5:30 pm	CUA Stadium	J. Maxwell	9,422
South Sydney Rabbitohs	34-14	Brisbane Broncos	10 June 2006 7:30 pm	Telstra Stadium	B. Cummins	6,537
North Queensland Cowboys	4-26	Cronulla Sharks	10 June 2006 7:30 pm	Dairy Farmers Stadium	S. Hampstead	16,778
Sydney Roosters	12-22	New Zealand Warriors	11 June 2006 2:30 pm	Sydney Football Stadium	R. Smith	6,807
Parramatta Eels	22-34	Melbourne Storm	11 June 2006 3:00 pm	Parramatta Stadium	P. Simpkins	7,139
Canterbury Bulldogs	26-28	Canberra Raiders	12 June 2006 3:00 pm	Telstra Stadium	G. Badger	12,541
Newcastle Knights	Bye

=== Round 15 ===
- St George Illawarra hooker Shaun Timmins is charged by Brisbane police on Saturday 17 June with public nuisance. Having not even played in the Dragon's match against the Brisbane Broncos the night earlier, it was alleged Timmins sat on a street sweeper whilst making his way back to his hotel room at around 3:30 am. Early reports quote the club's chief executive Peter Doust as saying that Timmins was not intoxicated at the time as far as he was aware. Media figures later summed this up as an over-reaction and, while not encouraging Timmins' actions, noted that it was an act of larrikinism rather than malice.

Home	Score	Away	Match information
Home	Score	Away	Date and time	Venue	Referee	Crowd
Brisbane Broncos	16-18	St George Illawarra Dragons	16 June 2006 7:30 pm	Suncorp Stadium	T. Archer	32,914
Wests Tigers	26-14	Sydney Roosters	17 June 2006 5:30 pm	Telstra Stadium	G. Badger	19,914
Parramatta Eels	30-10	South Sydney Rabbitohs	17 June 2006 7:30 pm	Parramatta Stadium	Russell Smith	10,097
Cronulla Sharks	15-12	Manly Warringah Sea Eagles	17 June 2006 7:30 pm	Toyota Park	S. Hampstead	11,083
New Zealand Warriors	30-18	Newcastle Knights	18 June 2006 2:00 pm	Ericsson Stadium	J. Maxwell	6,240
Melbourne Storm	22-12	Canberra Raiders	18 June 2006 2:30 pm	Olympic Park, Melbourne	P. Simpkins	7,954
Canterbury Bulldogs	20-12	North Queensland Cowboys	18 June 2006 3:00 pm	Carrara Stadium	S. Hayne	16,231
Penrith Panthers	Bye

=== Round 16 ===
- For the third week in a row, the Friday night game was won in the last minute, this time it was the Melbourne Storm winning 16-12 after trailing 12-10 with 3 seconds to go against the Canterbury Bulldogs.
- Wests Tigers' five-eighth Benji Marshall dislocated his right shoulder yet again, which ended his season.
- The Sydney Roosters' Craig Fitzgibbon and Brett Finch got into a swearing match during their match against the Canberra Raiders.
- The South Sydney Rabbitohs suffered their worst defeat in the club's history with a humiliating 66-0 loss to the New Zealand Warriors.

Home	Score	Away	Match information
Home	Score	Away	Date and time	Venue	Referee	Crowd
Melbourne Storm	16-12	Canterbury Bulldogs	23 June 2006 7:30 pm	Olympic Park	S. Hampstead	10,373
Newcastle Knights	16-26	Cronulla Sharks	24 June 2006 5:30 pm	Energy Australia Stadium	B. Cummins	18,2121
Penrith Panthers	24-20	Wests Tigers	24 June 2006 7:30 pm	CUA Stadium	Russell Smith	16,120
St George Illawarra Dragons	34-14	North Queensland Cowboys	24 June 2006 7:30 pm	WIN Stadium	P. Simpkins	13,289
Canberra Raiders	42-10	Sydney Roosters	25 June 2006 2:30 pm	Canberra Stadium	J. Robinson	11,876
Manly Warringah Sea Eagles	10-16	Brisbane Broncos	25 June 2006 3:00 pm	Brookvale Oval	S. Hayne	16,084
South Sydney Rabbitohs	0-66	New Zealand Warriors	25 June 2006 3:00 pm	Telstra Stadium	G. Badger	6,597
Parramatta Eels	Bye

=== Round 17 ===
Home	Score	Away	Match information
Home	Score	Away	Date and time	Venue	Referee	Crowd
Manly Warringah Sea Eagles	12-26	Newcastle Knights	30 June 2006 7:30 pm	Brookvale Oval	Sean Hampstead	13,284
New Zealand Warriors	28-22	Penrith Panthers	1 July 2006 5:30 pm	Ericsson Stadium	Ben Cummins	8,723
North Queensland Cowboys	16-14	South Sydney Rabbitohs	1 July 2006 7:30 pm	Dairy Farmers Stadium	Tony Archer	17,506
Canberra Raiders	12-18	Parramatta Eels	1 July 2006 7:30 pm	Canberra Stadium	Russell Smith	8,824
Brisbane Broncos	26-12	Cronulla Sharks	2 July 2006 2:30 pm	Suncorp Stadium	Shayne Hayne	25,863
Wests Tigers	10-32	Canterbury Bulldogs	2 July 2006 3:00 pm	Telstra Stadium	Paul Simpkins	22,511
Melbourne Storm	Bye
St George Illawarra Dragons	Bye
Sydney Roosters	Bye

=== Round 18 ===
- Newcastle Knights captain Andrew Johns became the all-time highest pointscorer in the 98-year history of top grade Rugby League in Australia, but caused controversy after his sides horrific 46-12 loss to the Parramatta Eels, by walking off field and ignoring a special presentation organised by the Eels officials, including Parramatta Eels coach Jason Taylor, who previously held the record.
- The Bulldogs gave themselves one of their biggest comebacks in the Club's history and the Warriors one of their worst collapses in their Club's history when the Bulldogs came from 16-0 down midway through the first half to win 22-18 in extra time at ANZ Stadium.
- Also, the Tigers appeared to be back on track with a 22-10 victory over the Cronulla Sharks at Toyota Park.

Home	Score	Away	Match information
Home	Score	Away	Date and time	Venue	Referee	Crowd
Melbourne Storm	10-4	Brisbane Broncos	7 July 2006 7:30 pm	Olympic Park Stadium	Sean Hampstead	15,479
Sydney Roosters	16-33	Manly Warringah Sea Eagles	8 July 2006 5:30 pm	Sydney Football Stadium	Paul Simpkins	8,824
Parramatta Eels	46-12	Newcastle Knights	8 July 2006 7:30 pm	Parramatta Stadium	Ben Cummins	13,167
Penrith Panthers	24-12	Canberra Raiders	8 July 2006 7:30 pm	CUA Stadium	Tony Archer	9,111
Canterbury Bulldogs	22-18	New Zealand Warriors	9 July 2006 2:30 pm	Telstra Stadium	Shayne Hayne	14,076
Cronulla Sharks	10-22	Wests Tigers	9 July 2006 3:00 pm	Toyota Park	Steven Clark	15,070
St George Illawarra Dragons	38-28	South Sydney Rabbitohs	9 July 2006 3:00 pm	OKI Jubilee Stadium	Jason Robinson	13,126
North Queensland Cowboys	Bye

=== Round 19 ===
Home	Score	Away	Match information
Home	Score	Away	Date and time	Venue	Referee	Crowd
St. George Illawarra Dragons	16-22	Canterbury Bulldogs	14 July 2006 7:30 pm	OKI Jubilee Stadium	Steven Clark	18,223
New Zealand Warriors	12-20	Parramatta Eels	15 July 2006 5:30 pm	Mt Smart Stadium	Sean Hampstead	14,499
South Sydney Rabbitohs	20-26	Manly Warringah Sea Eagles	15 July 2006 7:30 pm	Telstra Stadium	J. Maxwell	7,509
Penrith Panthers	17-8	North Queensland Cowboys	15 July 2006 7:30 pm	CUA Stadium	Ben Cummins	8,212
Newcastle Knights	16-24	Melbourne Storm	16 July 2006 2:00 pm	EnergyAustralia Stadium	Paul Simpkins	21,655
Canberra Raiders	20-18	Wests Tigers	16 July 2006 3:00 pm	Canberra Stadium	Tony Archer	9,125
Sydney Roosters	38-32	Cronulla Sharks	16 July 2006 3:00 pm	Sydney Football Stadium	Jason Robinson	9,241
Brisbane Broncos	Bye

=== Round 20 ===
Home	Score	Away	Match information
Home	Score	Away	Date and time	Venue	Referee	Crowd
Melbourne Storm	28-12	Cronulla Sharks	21 July 2006 7:30 pm	Olympic Park	Steven Clark	11,486
Canterbury Bulldogs	25-0	Sydney Roosters	22 July 2006 5:30 pm	Telstra Stadium	J. Maxwell	14,020
Newcastle Knights	24-18	South Sydney Rabbitohs	22 July 2006 7:30 pm	EnergyAustralia Stadium	G. Badger	14,599
North Queensland Cowboys	26-10	Brisbane Broncos	22 July 2006 7:30 pm	Dairy Farmers Stadium	Tony Archer	24,658
Wests Tigers	6-34	Parramatta Eels	23 July 2006 2:00 pm	Telstra Stadium	Shayne Hayne	21,456
Manly Warringah Sea Eagles	32-30	Penrith Panthers	23 July 2006 3:00 pm	Brookvale Oval	Jason Robinson	15,177
Canberra Raiders	31-12	St. George Illawarra Dragons	23 July 2006 3:00 pm	Canberra Stadium	Paul Simpkins	13,504
New Zealand Warriors	Bye

- This was the first time that the Sydney Roosters were held scoreless since Round 15 1994, Ending A 311 Game Run Scoring at Least One Point.

=== Round 21 ===
- The South Sydney Rabbitohs recorded only their second win for the season with a 21-8 win over the Canberra Raiders at Telstra Stadium.

Home	Score	Away	Match information
Home	Score	Away	Date and time	Venue	Referee	Crowd
Cronulla Sharks	18-22	Newcastle Knights	28 July 2006 7:30 pm	Toyota Park	Shayne Hayne	17,574
Penrith Panthers	36-6	New Zealand Warriors	29 July 2006 5:30 pm	CUA Stadium	Tony Archer	9,725
Parramatta Eels	31-18	Manly Warringah Sea Eagles	29 July 2006 7:30 pm	Parramatta Stadium	Steven Clark	15,404
South Sydney Rabbitohs	21-8	Canberra Raiders	29 July 2006 7:30 pm	Telstra Stadium	Jason Robinson	6,152
Brisbane Broncos	6-20	Wests Tigers	30 July 2006 2:30 pm	Suncorp Stadium	Paul Simpkins	31,500
St. George Illawarra Dragons	24-34	Melbourne Storm	30 July 2006 3:00 pm	OKI Jubilee Stadium	Sean Hampstead	13,866
Sydney Roosters	40-20	North Queensland Cowboys	20 July 2006 3:00 pm	Sydney Football Stadium	G. Badger	7,617
Canterbury Bulldogs	Bye

=== Round 22 ===
- Rugby league returned to the Central Coast for the first time in 2006, with over 18,000 packing into the picturesque Bluetongue Central Coast Stadium at Gosford to witness the Roosters play the Knights.
- Parramatta continued their winning streak with a victory over the Dragons, Cronulla slumped to another loss, whilst Melbourne and the Bulldogs all but extinguished the hopes of the 2005 Grand Finalists with big victories over the Wests Tigers and North Queensland Cowboys respectively.
- South Sydney recorded back-to-back victories for the only time this season.

Home	Score	Away	Match information
Home	Score	Away	Date and time	Venue	Referee	Crowd
Parramatta Eels	28-6	St George Illawarra Dragons	4 August 2006 7:30 pm	Parramatta Stadium	Steven Clark	19,137
New Zealand Warriors	12-10	Cronulla Sharks	5 August 2006 7:30 pm	Mt Smart Stadium	Jason Robinson	4,850
Melbourne Storm	46-4	Wests Tigers	5 August 2006 5:30 pm	Olympic Park Stadium	Sean Hampstead	12,481
North Queensland Cowboys	14-54	Canterbury Bulldogs	5 August 2006 7:30 pm	Dairy Farmers Stadium	Paul Simpkins	20,486
Canberra Raiders	30-18	Brisbane Broncos	6 August 2006 2:30 pm	Canberra Stadium	Gavin Badger	13,137
Sydney Roosters	18-32	Newcastle Knights	6 August 2006 3:00 pm	Bluetongue Central Coast Stadium	Tony Archer	18,124
South Sydney Rabbitohs	32-26	Penrith Panthers	6 August 2006 3:00 pm	Telstra Stadium	Ben Cummins	9,126
Manly Warringah Sea Eagles	Bye

=== Round 23 ===
- Refereeing woes continues in a thrilling Golden Point clash at Campbelltown, marred by referee Steve Clark's incorrect interpretation of the offside rule. Failure to penalise resulted in a late field goal to Canberra Raiders, winning them the match.
- The Cronulla Sharks and North Queensland Cowboys fell further out of favour for a top eight berth with poor performances on Saturday night, whilst the Bulldogs extended their run to six straight with a victory over the Dragons.
- The Tigers and Raiders became the first teams (and so far, only) to play two Golden Point games over the course of the season, it was also the Raiders' record 4th game in Golden Point in 2006, remarkably winning all of them, the Raiders record of most Golden Point games in a season has not been bettered, but has since been equalled by The Eels in 2011 who did not win any, drew one and lost the other three and the Tigers in 2012 winning two and losing the remaining two.
- Craig Fitzgibbon became the highest scoring forward this round, overtaking David Furner's previous record of 1218.

Home	Score	Away	Match information
Home	Score	Away	Date and time	Venue	Referee	Crowd
Newcastle Knights	14-16	Manly Warringah Sea Eagles	11 August 2006 7:30 pm	EnergyAustralia Stadium	Paul Simpkins	25,105
New Zealand Warriors	26-0	North Queensland Cowboys	12 August 2006 7:30 pm	Mt Smart Stadium	Gavin Badger	5,425
Cronulla Sharks	14-34	Parramatta Eels	12 August 2006 7:30 pm	Toyota Park	Tony Archer	12,830
Penrith Panthers	20-40	Sydney Roosters	12 August 2006 7:30 pm	CUA Stadium	Jason Robinson	11,704
Brisbane Broncos	12-18	Melbourne Storm	13 August 2006 2:30 pm	Suncorp Stadium	Shayne Hayne	40,159
Canterbury Bulldogs	26-10	St George Illawarra Dragons	13 August 2006 3:00 pm	Telstra Stadium	Sean Hampstead	31,256
Wests Tigers	18-19	Canberra Raiders	13 August 2006 3:00 pm	Campbelltown Stadium	Steven Clark	18,474
South Sydney Rabbitohs	Bye

- *Extra time was played.

=== Round 24 ===
- Several surprising results changed the face of the competition in Round 24. The most notable of these was the fall of first and second placed Melbourne and the Bulldogs to much less fancied opponents. The latter side suffered greatly in their 30-0 loss to the Brisbane Broncos, with two players suffering major injuries and their star forward Willie Mason receiving a two match suspension.
- Penrith's victory over Cronulla in the dying moments saw the clear eight cut and dried, although the Panthers did have a small chance of making the final eight had results gone their way.
- St George Illawarra fought their way back to form with a 30-point victory over the Wests Tigers.
- Despite the fact they lost their first game since Round 11, and their first match at home all season, the Storm secured the Minor Premiership this round after the Broncos beat the 2nd placed Bulldogs.

Home	Score	Away	Match information
Home	Score	Away	Date and time	Venue	Referee	Crowd
Canterbury Bulldogs	0-30	Brisbane Broncos	18 August 2006 7:30 pm	Telstra Stadium	S. Clark	26,111
Cronulla Sharks	28-32	Penrith Panthers	19 August 2006 5:30 pm	Toyota Park	J. Robinson	7,827
Melbourne Storm	20-24	New Zealand Warriors	19 August 2006 7:30 pm	Olympic Park	T. Archer	13,477
North Queensland Cowboys	12-19	Newcastle Knights	19 August 2006 7:30 pm	Dairy Farmers Stadium	S. Hampstead	17,898
Sydney Roosters	26-40	Parramatta Eels	20 August 2006 2:30 pm	Sydney Football Stadium	P. Simpkins	15,142
Manly Warringah Sea Eagles	38-16	South Sydney Rabbitohs	20 August 2006 3:00 pm	Brookvale Oval	R. Smith	19,253
St George Illawarra Dragons	46-16	Wests Tigers	20 August 2006 3:00 pm	Oki Jubilee Stadium	S. Hayne	14,211
Canberra Raiders	Bye

=== Round 25 ===
- Controversy struck the NRL again when North Queensland Cowboys player Mitchell Sargent testing positive for cocaine. He was immediately sacked from the club.
- The Panthers were the only team outside the eight before Round 25 with a slight chance of becoming finalists. However, with the Panthers losing, the top eight became set in stone, meaning no other team was able to make the final series.
- For the second week in a row, the Broncos held their opponents scoreless, beating Parramatta 23-0. This was the first time this had happened since Round 13 and 14 1999; that time was also Brisbane.

Home	Score	Away	Match information
Home	Score	Away	Date and time	Venue	Referee	Crowd
Manly Warringah Sea Eagles	21-20	Canterbury Bulldogs	25 August 2006 7:30 pm	Brookvale Oval	S. Hampstead	20,163
Canberra Raiders	18-22	Melbourne Storm	26 August 2006 5:30 pm	Canberra Stadium	S. Clark	23,665
Newcastle Knights	40-4	Penrith Panthers	26 August 2006 7:30 pm	Energy Australia Stadium	S. Hayne	21,255
St George Illawarra Dragons	18-4	Cronulla Sharks	26 August 2006 7:30 pm	WIN Stadium	P. Simpkins	16,897
New Zealand Warriors	42-16	Sydney Roosters	27 August 2006 2:00 pm	Mt Smart Stadium	R. Smith	12,711
South Sydney Rabbitohs	12-34	North Queensland Cowboys	27 August 2006 2:30 pm	Telstra Stadium	T. De Las Heras	8,914
Parramatta Eels	0-23	Brisbane Broncos	27 August 2006 3:00 pm	Parramatta Stadium	T. Archer	20,353
Wests Tigers	Bye

=== Round 26 ===
- With one round to go, the top eight had already settled, with no team outside the top eight able to make the final series. Teams between positions three and six were all in with a chance to host a home semi final at the start at the round and the jostling for positions continued over the weekend. The top eight was finalised on Sunday when the Brisbane Broncos defeated the New Zealand Warriors 36-12. The Melbourne Storm and Bulldogs had their final positions locked in going into the final round.
- Coaching dramas engulfed the game leading into Round 26, with the news that Ricky Stuart was to be dumped as the coach of the Sydney Roosters for the 2007 NRL Season. Whilst a replacement was yet to be found, the South Sydney Rabbitohs were quick to tie up any chance of losing incoming assistant coach Jason Taylor by promoting him to head coach for the coming season.

Home	Score	Away	Match information
Home	Score	Away	Date and time	Venue	Referee	Crowd
North Queensland Cowboys	22-8	Parramatta Eels	1 September 2006 7:30 pm	Dairy Farmers Stadium	S. Hayne	18,351
Cronulla Sharks	24-26	Canberra Raiders	2 September 2006 5:30 pm	Toyota Park	S. Clark	9,289
Melbourne Storm	30-20	Manly Warringah Sea Eagles	2 September 2006 7:30 pm	Olympic Park	P. Simpkins	13,991
Sydney Roosters	16-36	St George Illawarra Dragons	2 September 2006 7:30 pm	Sydney Cricket Ground	R. Smith	17,142
Penrith Panthers	22-30	Canterbury Bulldogs	3 September 2006 3:00 pm	CUA Stadium	T. Archer	13,363
Wests Tigers	52-18	South Sydney Rabbitohs	3 September 2006 3:00 pm	Leichhardt Oval	T. De Les Heras	18,440
Brisbane Broncos	36-12	New Zealand Warriors	3 September 2006 2:30 pm	Suncorp Stadium	S. Hampstead	47,193
Newcastle Knights	Bye

== Finals ==
=== Week One ===
==== First Qualifying Final ====
Team	1st half	2nd half	Total
(4) Newcastle Knights	0	25	25
(5) Manly Warringah Sea Eagles	12	6	18

Date	Friday, 8 September 2006 7:30 pm AEST
Tries (Newcastle Knights)	2 K. Gidley; 1: A. Johns, B. Carney
Tries (Manly Warringah Sea Eagles)	1: C. Hicks B. Stewart, S. Matai
Goals (Newcastle Knights)	4 from 4: A. Johns
Goals (Manly Warringah Sea Eagles)	3 from 4: M. Orford
Field goals (Newcastle Knights)	1: J. Mullen
Field goals (Manly Warringah Sea Eagles)	None
Venue	EnergyAustralia Stadium, Newcastle, NSW
Attendance	23,572
Referee	Sean Hampstead

==== Second Qualifying Final ====
Team	1st half	2nd half	Total
(3) Brisbane Broncos	4	0	4
(6) St. George Illawarra Dragons	10	10	20

Date	Saturday, 9 September 2006 5:30 pm AEST
Tries (Brisbane Broncos)	1: D. Boyd
Tries (St. George Illawarra Dragons)	1: C. Greenshields A. Gorrell, L. Bailey, M. Cooper
Goals (Brisbane Broncos)	0 from 1: C. Parker
Goals (St. George Illawarra Dragons)	2 from 3: A. Gorrell; 0 from 1: M. Head
Field goals (Brisbane Broncos)	None
Field goals (St. George Illawarra Dragons)	None
Venue	Suncorp Stadium, Brisbane, QLD
Attendance	50,387
Referee	Paul Simpkins

==== Third Qualifying Final ====
Team	1st half	2nd half	Total
(2) Canterbury Bulldogs	12	18	30
(7) Canberra Raiders	6	6	12

Date	Saturday, 9 September 2006 7:30 pm AEST
Tries (Canterbury Bulldogs)	1: L. Patten, H. El Masri, A. Ryan, D. Holdsworth, A. Emelio
Tries (Canberra Raiders)	1: P. Graham, A. Purtell
Goals (Canterbury Bulldogs)	5 from 5: H. El Masri
Goals (Canberra Raiders)	2 from 2: C. Schifcofske
Field goals (Canterbury Bulldogs)	None
Field goals (Canberra Raiders)	None
Venue	Telstra Stadium, Sydney, NSW
Attendance	14,628
Referee	Shayne Hayne

==== Fourth Qualifying Final ====
Team	1st half	2nd half	Total
(1) Melbourne Storm	12	0	12
(8) Parramatta Eels	0	6	6

Date	Sunday, 10 September 2006 4:00 pmAEST
Tries (Melbourne Storm)	1: A. Kaufusi, S. Turner
Tries (Parramatta Eels)	1: D. Wagon
Goals (Melbourne Storm)	2 from 2: C. Smith
Goals (Parramatta Eels)	1 from 1: L. Burt
Field goals (Melbourne Storm)	None
Field goals (Parramatta Eels)	None
Venue	Olympic Park, Melbourne, VIC
Attendance	15,690
Referee	Steven Clark

There was major controversy in this match when, approximately 15 minutes from full-time, Parramatta second-rower Glenn Morrison crashed over the Melbourne Storm line. With the decision sent to the video referee (Bill Harrigan), it appeared that Morrison deserved a try - benefit of the doubt. However, Harrigan ruled he had been held up by Storm fullback Billy Slater and the try was not awarded.

=== Week Two ===
==== First Semi Final ====
Team	1st half	2nd half	Total
(6) St. George Illawarra Dragons	8	20	28
(5) Manly Warringah Sea Eagles	0	0	0

Date	Friday, 15 September 2006 7:45 pm AEST
Tries (St. George Illawarra Dragons)	2: B. Morris; 1: B. Hornby, D. Millard, M. Cooper
Tries (Manly Warringah Sea Eagles)	None
Goals (St. George Illawarra Dragons)	3 from 3: A. Gorrell; 1 from 1 W. Naiqama; 0 from 2 M. Head
Goals (Manly Warringah Sea Eagles)	None
Field goals (St. George Illawarra Dragons)	None
Field goals (Manly Warringah Sea Eagles)	None
Venue	Sydney Football Stadium, Sydney, NSW
Attendance	30,907
Referee	Paul Simpkins

==== Second Semi Final ====
Team	1st half	2nd half	Total
(4) Newcastle Knights	0	6	6
(3) Brisbane Broncos	24	26	50

Date	Saturday, 16 September 2006 7:45 pm AEST
Tries (Newcastle Knights)	1 K. Gidley
Tries (Brisbane Broncos)	1: D. Stagg, B. Tate, J. Hodges, K. Hunt, P. Civoniceva, S. Berrigan, D. Lockyer, D. Boyd
Goals (Newcastle Knights)	1 from 2: A. Johns
Goals (Brisbane Broncos)	8 from 8: C. Parker; 1 from 1: D. Lockyer
Field goals (Newcastle Knights)	None
Field goals (Brisbane Broncos)	None
Venue	Sydney Football Stadium, Sydney, NSW
Attendance	22,081
Referee	Steven Clark

=== Week Three ===
==== First Preliminary Final ====
Team	1st half	2nd half	Total
(2) Canterbury Bulldogs	20	0	20
(3) Brisbane Broncos	6	31	37

Date	Friday, 22 September 2006 7:45 pm AEST
Tries (Canterbury Bulldogs)	1 D. Holdsworth, H. El Masri, B. Shewin, M. Utai
Tries (Brisbane Broncos)	2: S. Berrigan; 1: D. Carlaw, D. Boyd, D. Lockyer, B. Tate, C. Parker
Goals (Canterbury Bulldogs)	4 from 4: H. El Masri
Goals (Brisbane Broncos)	3 from 6: C. Parker; 2 from 2: D. Lockyer
Field goals (Canterbury Bulldogs)	None
Field goals (Brisbane Broncos)	1: D. Lockyer
Venue	Sydney Football Stadium, Sydney, NSW
Attendance	29,511
Referee	Paul Simpkins

==== Second Preliminary Final ====
Team	1st half	2nd half	Total
(1) Melbourne Storm	12	12	24
(6) St. George Illawarra Dragons	6	4	10

Date	Saturday, 23 September 2006 7:45 pm AEST
Tries (Melbourne Storm)	1 G. Inglis, M. King, S. Turner, A. Kaufusi
Tries (St. George Illawarra Dragons)	1: M. Cooper, B. Morris
Goals (Melbourne Storm)	3 from 3: C. Smith; 1 from 1: M. Geyer
Goals (St. George Illawarra Dragons)	1 from 1: A. Gorrell; 0 from 1: B. Morris
Field goals (Melbourne Storm)	None
Field goals (St. George Illawarra Dragons)	None
Venue	Telstra Stadium, Sydney, NSW
Attendance	40,901
Referee	Steven Clark

=== Grand final ===
Team	1st half	2nd half	Total
(1) Melbourne Storm	4	4	8
(3) Brisbane Broncos	8	7	15

Date	Sunday, 1 October 2006 7:45 pm AEST
Tries (Melbourne Storm)	1 S. Turner, M. King
Tries (Brisbane Broncos)	1: J. Hodges, B. Tate
Goals (Melbourne Storm)	0 from 1: C. Smith; 0 from 1 M. Geyer
Goals (Brisbane Broncos)	2 from 2: D. Lockyer; 1 from 2: C. Parker
Field goals (Melbourne Storm)	None
Field goals (Brisbane Broncos)	1: D. Lockyer
Venue	Telstra Stadium, Sydney, NSW
Attendance	79,609
Referee	Paul Simpkins

- This was the first Grand Final where there were no Sydney teams featuring in the Grand Final.
- This was the first Grand Final meeting between these two sides.
