= Shane Webcke =

Australia international rugby league footballer

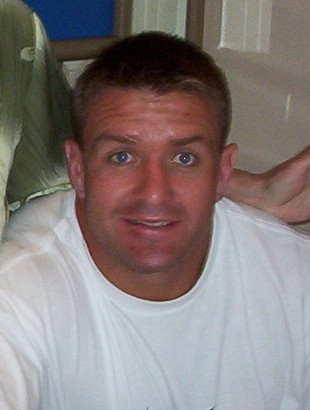

Personal information
- Born: 28 September 1974 (age 52) Toowoomba, Queensland, Australia

Playing information
- Height: 183 cm (6 ft 0 in)
- Weight: 112 kg (17 st 9 lb)
- Position: Prop
Club
Years	Team	Pld	T	G	FG	P
1995–2006	Brisbane Broncos	254	18	0	0	72
Representative
Years	Team	Pld	T	G	FG	P
1998–2004	Queensland	21	1	0	0	4
1998–2004	Australia	26	2	0	0	8
1997	Australia (SL)	1	0	0	0	0
1997	Queensland (SL)	3	0	0	0	0

Shane Webcke (born 28 September 1974) is an Australian former professional rugby league footballer, who spent his entire club career playing for the Brisbane Broncos. Webcke represented Queensland in the State of Origin 21 times and also captained the side. He made 26 test appearances for Australia. His position was prop forward and at his peak he was renowned as the best front rower in the world. Alongside Glenn Lazarus and Arthur Beetson, Webcke is considered by many to have been one of the finest post-war front-rowers to play the game.

After retiring from playing in 2006, Webcke became the Sunday–Thursday sports presenter on Seven News in his hometown of Brisbane, a position he held until 2024.

== Early life ==
Webcke was born in Toowoomba, Queensland, of German and Scottish descent.

Originally from Leyburn, Queensland and having played for Toowoomba, Webcke was scouted by Wayne Bennett, whom he acknowledges as the greatest influence on his career, after seeing him play as a schoolboy in 1993. The following year Webcke's father was killed in a work accident when he was still 19 years of age.

== Playing career ==
=== 1990s ===
Webcke made his debut for the Broncos in the 1995 ARL season. Within two seasons he had his first premiership ring, when he helped Brisbane to victory over the Cronulla-Sutherland Sharks in the 1997 Super League season's grand final.

Webcke made his first appearance for the Queensland Maroons in the first game of the 1998 State of Origin series and was named man of the match in the third and deciding game that year. From his debut until his retirement from representative football following Game III in 2004, no other player wore the number 8 for Queensland.

Webcke won his second grand final in 1998, when Brisbane defeated the Canterbury-Bankstown Bulldogs.

=== 2000s ===
In 2000 Webcke broke his arm during the finals series that season but went on to play for the Broncos in their grand final victory over the Sydney Roosters. Post-season he was a member of the Australian team that won the 2000 Rugby League World Cup. Webcke was also awarded the Australian Sports Medal for his contribution to Australia's international standing in rugby league. Following Australia's World Cup victory, Webcke and teammate Gorden Tallis wrote an open letter to players appealing for an end to scandalous behaviour amongst footballers which had been tarnishing the sport.

Having won the 2000 NRL Premiership, the Broncos travelled to England to play against 2000's Super League V Champions, St. Helens for the 2001 World Club Challenge, with Webcke playing at prop forward in Brisbane's loss.

Webcke won the Broncos' best player award for the 2001 season. Post-season he refused to tour with the Kangaroos in the wake of the 11 September attacks. At the end of the 2003 NRL season, he went on the 2003 Kangaroo tour of Great Britain and France, helping Australia to victory over Great Britain the last time rugby league's Ashes series was contested. Webcke was selected in the Australian team to compete in the 2004 Tri-Nations tournament. In the final against Great Britain he played in the Kangaroos' 44–4 victory. With the representative retirement of Gorden Tallis and an injury to Darren Lockyer, Webcke captained Queensland in Game 1 of the 2004 State of Origin series, which the Maroons lost 9–8 in golden point extra time. Webcke again won the Paul Morgan Medal for the Broncos' best and fairest player for the 2005 season.

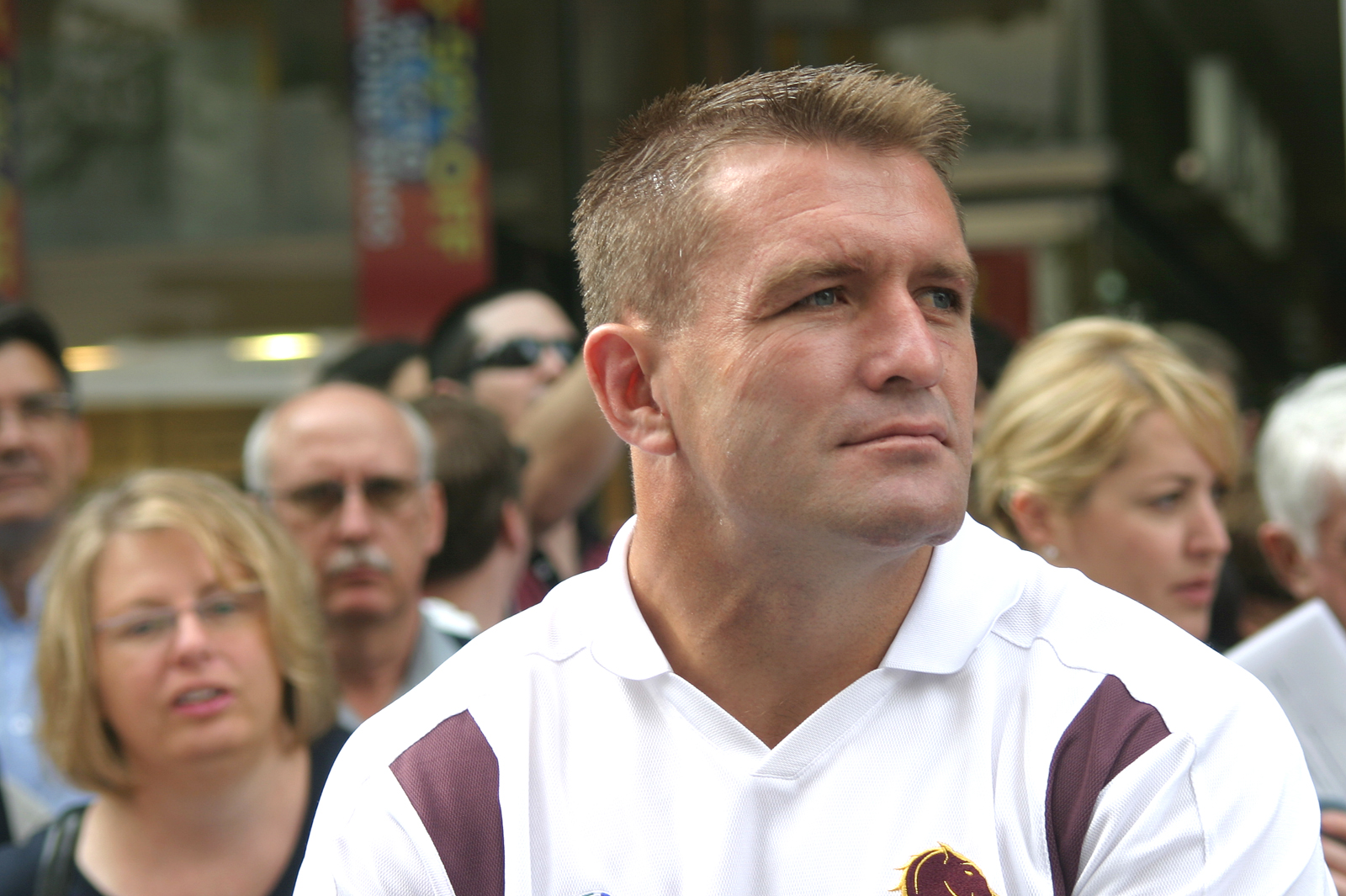
Webcke at Brisbane's post-2006 NRL grand final celebration parade.

Webcke announced on 26 April 2006 that he would retire at the end of the 2006 NRL season. Webcke's final game was the Broncos' victory in the 2006 grand final against the Melbourne Storm, days after his 32nd birthday.

== Post-playing ==
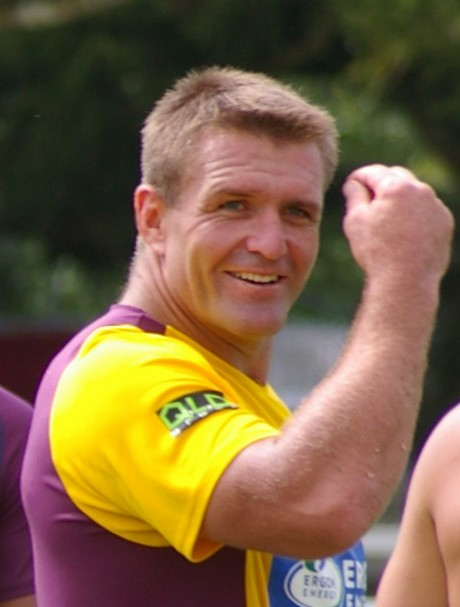
Webcke training with the Broncos in 2006

Post-football, Webcke went on to release his auto-biography, Warhorse and also ventured into media with the Seven Network in his hometown of Brisbane, presenting sport on the local Seven News bulletin on Sundays to Thursdays. He also worked on-screen with Matthew Johns in the first and only season of The Matty Johns Show.

Webcke's pub at Leyburn, Queensland – the Royal Hotel – is the longest, continuously licensed premises in Queensland.

Webcke was set to become the first player to give the annual Tom Brock Lecture when he was invited to do so in 2007, but this did not eventuate.

In 2007 at the Broncos' 20-year anniversary celebration, the club announced a list of the 20 best players to play for them to date which included Webcke.

In February 2008, Webcke was named in the list of Australia's 100 Greatest Players (1908–2007) which was commissioned by the NRL and ARL to celebrate the code's centenary year in Australia.

A few months later the Brisbane Broncos appointed Shane Webcke, along with Allan Langer, as full-time assistant coaches to work alongside new head coach Ivan Henjak from the 2009 season. However, shortly after the start of the season, Webcke quit his post in the wake of controversy surrounding the release of his new book in which he was openly critical of the Broncos administration not standing down star players Darius Boyd, Sam Thaiday and Karmichael Hunt when police were investigating sexual assault allegations against them in September 2008. He went on to state that he was 'filthy' about the state of affairs at the Broncos.

== Honours ==
=== Individual ===
- 3× Dally M Prop Of The Year: 2000, 2001, 2002
- Ron McAuliffe Medal: 2002
- Rugby League Week Player of the Year: 2001
- Named in NRL Team of the 1990s: 2003
- 2× Brisbane Broncos Player of the Year: 2001, 2005

== Playing career highlights ==
- Junior Club: Wattles Allora/Clifton
- First Grade Debut: Round 10, Brisbane v. Norths at North Sydney, 19 May 1995 won
- First Grade Premierships: 1997, 1998, 2000 and 2006 with Brisbane Broncos
- Career Stats: 254 career appearances with 18 tries
- State of Origin: 21 games for Queensland between 1998 and 2004, captain in Game I 2004
- International: 26 tests for Australia
