= 2004 St. George Illawarra Dragons season =

St. George Illawarra Dragons
- 2004 season
- CEO: (Australia) Peter Doust
- Head coach: (Australia) Nathan Brown
- Captain: (Australia) Trent Barrett
- NRL: 5th, Qualifying Final
- Top try scorer: Club: Matt Cooper (17)
- Top points scorer: Club: Mathew Head (119)
- Highest home attendance: 18, 932 (vs. Penrith in Round 6, 18 April 2004)
- Lowest home attendance: 9, 362 (vs. Newcastle in Round 4, 4 April 2004))
- Average home attendance: 14, 347

The 2004 St. George Illawarra Dragons season was the 6th in the joint-venture club's history, and they competed in the 2004 NRL season. Coached by Nathan Brown and captained by Trent Barrett, they finished the 2004 Telstra Premiership 5th (out of 15 teams) at the end of the regular season. The Dragons then reached the first week of the finals when they were knocked out by the Penrith Panthers. This was the result of some major upsets which involved two of the top three ranked teams (Bulldogs and Brisbane Broncos) also losing in the first week of the finals.

== Draw and Results ==
14 March 2004	St. George Illawarra Dragons	12-21	Canberra Raiders	Kogarah, New South Wales
14:30	Dean Young 43'; Reece Simmonds 55'; Goals: Mark Riddell 1/2; Brett Firman 1/1			Stadium: OKI Jubilee Oval; Player of the Match: Mark McLinden

20 March 2004	New Zealand Warriors	10-16	St. George Illawarra Dragons	Auckland, New Zealand
17:30			Matt Cooper 35'; Mathew Head 40'; Reece Simmonds 53'; Goals: Mark Riddell 2/3; Mathew Head 0/1	Stadium: Ericsson Stadium; Player of the Match: Matt Cooper

28 March 2004	Melbourne Storm	34-6	St. George Illawarra Dragons	Melbourne, Victoria
15:00			Matt Cooper 13'; Goals: Mark Riddell 1/2	Stadium: Olympic Park; Player of the Match: Steve Turner

4 April 2004	St. George Illawarra Dragons	48-2	Newcastle Knights	Wollongong, New South Wales
15:00	Reece Simmonds 40, 68'; Mark Riddell 58, 64'; Shaun Timmins 3'; Mark Gasnier 15'; Nathan Blacklock 23'; Lance Thompson 72'; Trent Barrett 75'; Goals: Mark Riddell 4/6; Mathew Head 2/3			Stadium: WIN Stadium; Player of the Match: Mark Riddell

11 April 2004	Wests Tigers	10-39	St. George Illawarra Dragons	Sydney, New South Wales
14:30			Ben Hornby 22, 54'; Matt Cooper 33, 64'; Mark Gasnier 38'; Shaun Timmins 45'; Ashton Sims 67'; Goals: Mathew Head 3/5; Mark Riddell 2/3; Field Goal: Trent Barrett 57'	Stadium: Telstra Stadium; Player of the Match: Matt Cooper

18 April 2004	St. George Illawarra Dragons	44-18	Penrith Panthers	Wollongong, New South Wales
14:30	Matt Cooper 23, 25, 55, 70'; Trent Barrett 2'; Mathew Head 53'; Nathan Blacklock 59'; Mark Riddell 63'; Goals: Mathew Head 5/6; Mark Riddell 1/2			Stadium: WIN Stadium; Player of the Match: Matt Cooper

25 April 2004	St. George Illawarra Dragons	8-11	Sydney Roosters	Sydney, New South Wales
15:00	Reece Simmonds 44'; Goals: Mathew Head 2/2			Stadium: Aussie Stadium; Player of the Match: Brad Fittler

1 May 2004	Cronulla Sharks	12-42	St. George Illawarra Dragons	Cronulla, New South Wales
19:30			Ben Hornby 19, 61, 66'; Mark Gasnier 4, 75'; Tony Jensen 7'; Nathan Blacklock 43'; Goals: Mark Riddell 6/6; Mathew Head 1/1	Stadium: Toyota Park; Player of the Match: Ben Hornby

9 May 2004	Manly Sea Eagles	21-10	St. George Illawarra Dragons	Manly, New South Wales
15:00			Brent Kite 60'; Reece Simmonds 66'; Goals: Mark Riddell 1/2	Stadium: Brookvale Oval; Player of the Match: John Hopoate

15 May 2004	St. George Illawarra Dragons	12-38	Canterbury Bulldogs	Wollongong, New South Wales
17:30	Justin Poore 73'; Ben Hornby 79'; Goals: Mark Riddell 1/2			Stadium: WIN Stadium

21 May 2004	Parramatta Eels	6-37	St. George Illawarra Dragons	Parramatta, New South Wales
19:30			Daniel Holdsworth 65, 76'; Reece Simmonds 5'; Mathew Head 55'; David Howell 63'; Mark Riddell 71'; Goals: Mark Riddell 5/6; Mathew Head 1/1; Field Goal: Mathew Head 69'	Stadium: Parramatta Stadium; Player of the Match: Mathew Head

28 May 2004	Brisbane Broncos	24-22	St. George Illawarra Dragons	Brisbane, Queensland
19:30			Mark Gasnier 3, 80'; Ben Hornby 16'; Shaun Timmins 36'; Goals: Mark Riddell 2/3; Mathew Head 1/1	Stadium: Suncorp Stadium; Player of the Match: Casey McGuire

5 June 2004	St. George Illawarra Dragons	12-14	North Queensland Cowboys	Wollongong, New South Wales
19:30	Matt Cooper 27'; David Howell 65'; Ben Creagh 76'; Goals: Mathew Head 0/3			Stadium: WIN Stadium

11 June 2004	Penrith Panthers	8-28	St. George Illawarra Dragons	Penrith, New South Wales
19:30			David Howell 3'; Lincoln Withers 36'; Reece Simmonds 43'; Matt Cooper 53'; Michael Henderson 76'; Goals: Mathew Head 4/4; Mark Riddell 0/1	Stadium: Penrith Stadium; Player of the Match: Trent Barrett

20 June 2004	St. George Illawarra Dragons	50-0	Wests Tigers	Kogarah, New South Wales
15:00	Mark Gasnier 11, 26, 44, 56'; Matt Cooper 21'; Ashton Sims 30'; Ben Creagh 39'; Dean Young 65'; Mark Riddell 80'; Goals: Mathew Head 7/9			Stadium: OKI Jubilee Oval; Player of the Match: Mark Gasnier

27 June 2004	South Sydney Rabbitohs	12-52	St. George Illawarra Dragons	Sydney, New South Wales
15:00			Ben Hornby 21, 25'; Reece Simmonds 16, 49'; Matt Cooper 71, 77'; Mark Gasnier 4'; Lance Thompson 6'; Brent Kite 19'; Ben Creagh 59'; Goals: Mathew Head 5/9; Mark Riddell 1/1	Stadium: Aussie Stadium; Player of the Match: Mark Gasnier

BYE	v	St. George Illawarra Dragons

9 July 2004	St. George Illawarra Dragons	14-28	Brisbane Broncos	Wollongong, New South Wales
19:30	Shaun Timmins 13'; Lincoln Withers 70'; Andrew Frew 79'; Goals: Mathew Head 1/3			Stadium: WIN Stadium; Player of the Match: Neville Costigan

16 July 2004	Sydney Roosters	18-14	St. George Illawarra Dragons	Sydney, New South Wales
19:30	Ryan Cross (yellow card) 26' to 36'		Clint Greenshields (yellow card) 53' to 63'; Nathan Blacklock 18'; John Carlaw 27'; Goals: Mathew Head 3/3	Stadium: Aussie Stadium

25 July 2004	St. George Illawarra Dragons	26-14	Cronulla Sharks	Kogarah, New South Wales
15:00	Reece Simmonds 9, 75'; Trent Barrett 18'; Lincoln Withers 45'; Mark Riddell 73'; Goals: Mathew Head 3/5			Stadium: OKI Jubilee Oval; Player of the Match: Trent Barrett

31 July 2004	North Queensland Cowboys	34-10	St. George Illawarra Dragons	Townsville, Queensland
19:30			Ben Creagh 40'; Nick Youngquest 60'; Goals: Mark Riddell 1/1; Mathew Head 0/1	Stadium: Dairy Farmers Stadium; Player of the Match: Matt Bowen

6 August 2004	St. George Illawarra Dragons	34-10	Melbourne Storm	Wollongong, New South Wales
19:30	Matt Cooper 3, 62'; Trent Barrett 37'; John Carlaw 46'; Reece Simmonds 59'; Lincoln Withers 69'; Goals: Mark Riddell 3/4; Mathew Head 2/2			Stadium: WIN Stadium; Player of the Match: Jason Ryles

14 August 2004	St. George Illawarra Dragons	28-10	New Zealand Warriors	Wollongong, New South Wales
19:30	John Carlaw 10'; Mark Riddell 13'; Reece Simmonds 36'; Ben Hornby 39'; Nick Youngquest 50'; Ashton Sims 73'; Goals: Mark Riddell 1/3; Mathew Head 1/3			Stadium: WIN Stadium; Player of the Match: Mathew Head

20 August 2004	Newcastle Knights	22-24	St. George Illawarra Dragons	Newcastle, New South Wales
19:30			Nick Youngquest 8, 60'; Mathew Head 53, 56'; Matt Cooper 73'; Goals: Mathew Head 2/4; Mark Riddell 0/1	Stadium: EnergyAustralia Stadium; Player of the Match: Mathew Head

29 August 2004	St. George Illawarra Dragons	36-34	Manly Sea Eagles	Kogarah, New South Wales
14:30	Nathan Blacklock 57, 62'; Shaun Timmins 33'; Lincoln Withers 47'; Ben Hornby 64'; Matt Cooper 67'; Justin Poore 77'; Goals: Mark Riddell 3/5; Mathew Head 1/2			Stadium: OKI Jubilee Oval

St. George Illawarra Dragons	v	BYE

10 September 2004	Penrith Panthers	31-30	St. George Illawarra Dragons	Penrith, New South Wales
20:00	Preston Campbell; Trent Waterhouse; Luke Priddis Goals: Ryan Girdler 5/5; Field Goals: Craig Gower		Nathan Blacklock 33'; Ben Hornby 37'; Shaun Timmins 53'; Lance Thompson 66'; Dean Young 77'; Goals: Mathew Head 5/5	Stadium: Penrith Stadium; Attendance: 21,963; Referee: Sean Hampstead; Player of the Match: Trent Waterhouse

== Ladder ==
2004 NRL season
Pos	Team	Pld	W	D	L	B	PF	PA	PD	Pts
1	Sydney Roosters	24	19	0	5	2	710	368	+342	42
2	Canterbury-Bankstown Bulldogs (P)	24	19	0	5	2	760	491	+269	42
3	Brisbane Broncos	24	16	1	7	2	602	533	+69	37
4	Penrith Panthers	24	15	0	9	2	672	567	+105	34
5	St George Illawarra Dragons	24	14	0	10	2	624	415	+209	32
6	Melbourne Storm	24	13	0	11	2	684	517	+167	30
7	North Queensland Cowboys	24	12	1	11	2	526	514	+12	29
8	Canberra Raiders	24	11	0	13	2	554	613	−59	26
9	Wests Tigers	24	10	0	14	2	509	534	−25	24
10	Newcastle Knights	24	10	0	14	2	516	617	−101	24
11	Cronulla-Sutherland Sharks	24	10	0	14	2	528	645	−117	24
12	Parramatta Eels	24	9	0	15	2	517	626	−109	22
13	Manly-Warringah Sea Eagles	24	9	0	15	2	615	754	−139	22
14	New Zealand Warriors	24	6	0	18	2	427	693	−266	16
15	South Sydney Rabbitohs	24	5	2	17	2	455	812	−357	16

== Squad ==
No.

Position
Player

Luke Bailey – PR Trent Barrett – FE (captain) Nathan Blacklock – WG John Carlaw – CE Matt Cooper – CE Ben Creagh – SR Brett Firman – HB Andrew Frew – WG Mark Gasnier – CE Clint Greenshields – FB Mathew Head – HB Michael Henderson – PR Daniel Holdsworth – FE Ben Hornby – HB David Howell – CE Michael Howell – LK Tony Jensen – SR

No.

Position
Player

Brent Kite – PR Nathan Long – PR Bryan Norrie – PR Henry Perenara – SR Justin Poore – PR Ryan Powell – HK Mark Riddell – HK Lachlan Russell – HB Jason Ryles – PR Reece Simmonds – WG Ashton Sims – SR Lance Thompson – SR Shaun Timmins – LK Aaron Wheatley – SR Lincoln Withers – HK Dean Young – LK Nick Youngquest – WG
