= Anzac Day Cup =

Australian rugby league match

ANZAC Day Cup
- Sport: Rugby league
- Inaugural season: 2002
- Number of teams: Sydney Roosters; St. George Illawarra Dragons
- Country: Australia (National Rugby League)
- Cup holders: Sydney Roosters (2026)
- Most titles: Sydney Roosters (13 titles)

The ANZAC Day Cup is a rugby league match contested annually in the National Rugby League between the Sydney Roosters and the St. George Illawarra Dragons. The ANZAC Day Cup was introduced in 2002 to honour the Australian and New Zealand Army Corps.

In 2020, due to the COVID-19 pandemic in Australia, the cup was instead contested on 6 August, the anniversary of the Battle of Lone Pine. This match is therefore not considered to be an Anzac Cup match, but rather a Battle of Lone Pine Cup game, as it wasn’t played on Anzac Day and the Ashton-Collier Spirit of Anzac Medal for Player of the Match was not awarded.

== Results ==
=== 2002 ===
25 April 2002 Round 7	Sydney Roosters	24–20	St. George Illawarra Dragons	Sydney
7:30 PM	Shannon Hegarty (1); Justin Holbrook (1); Luke Phillips (1); Craig Wing (1); Justin Holbrook Goals 4/5	Statistics	Trent Barrett (1); Willie Peters (1); Nathan Tutt (1); Aaron Gorrell Goals 3/3; Amos Roberts Goals 1/1	Stadium: Sydney Football Stadium; Attendance: 20,588; Referee: Tony Archer

=== 2003 ===
25 April 2003 Round 7	St. George Illawarra Dragons	24–20	Sydney Roosters	Sydney
3:00 PM	Trent Barrett (1); Brett Firman (1); Chris Nero (1); Mark Riddell (1); Mark Riddell Goals 4/4	Statistics	Brett Finch (1); Brad Fittler (1); Shannon Hegarty (1); Justin Hodges (1); Craig Fitzgibbon Goals 2/4	Stadium: Sydney Football Stadium; Attendance: 26,014; Referee: Shayne Hayne

=== 2004 ===
25 April 2004 Round 7	Sydney Roosters	11–8	St. George Illawarra Dragons	Sydney
3:00 PM	Brad Fittler (1); Michael Crocker Goals 2/3; Chris Walker Goals 1/1; Brett Finch Field Goals 1/1	Statistics	Reece Simmonds (1); Mathew Head Goals 2/2	Stadium: Sydney Football Stadium; Attendance: 26,246; Referee: Steve Clark

=== 2005 ===
25 April 2005 Round 7	St. George Illawarra Dragons	26–24	Sydney Roosters	Sydney
3:00 PM	Ben Hornby (2); Matt Cooper (1); Shaun Timmins (1); Mathew Head Goals 5/6	Statistics	Chris Walker (2); Ryan Cross (1); Anthony Minichiello (1); Craig Fitzgibbon Goals 3/3; Amos Roberts Goals 1/1	Stadium: Sydney Football Stadium; Attendance: 32,270; Referee: Sean Hampstead

=== 2006 ===
25 April 2006 Round 7	St. George Illawarra Dragons	22–12	Sydney Roosters	Sydney
3:00 PM	Wes Naiqama (2); Matt Bickerstaff (1); Mark Gasnier (1); Mathew Head Goals 3/5	Statistics	Amos Roberts (1); David Shillington (1); Craig Fitzgibbon Goals 2/2	Stadium: Sydney Football Stadium; Attendance: 31,105; Referee: Steve Clark

=== 2007 ===
25 April 2007 Round 7	Sydney Roosters	18–4	St. George Illawarra Dragons	Sydney
3:00 PM	Shaun Kenny-Dowall (2); Sam Perrett (1); Craig Fitzgibbon Goals 3/5	Statistics	Chase Stanley (1)	Stadium: Sydney Football Stadium; Attendance: 18,240; Referee: Paul Simpkins

=== 2008 ===
25 April 2008 Round 7	St. George Illawarra Dragons	26–6	Sydney Roosters	Sydney
3:15 PM	Ben Hornby (1); Brett Morris (1); Josh Morris (1); Jason Nightingale (1); Jamie Soward Goals 5/6	Statistics	Anthony Tupou (1); Craig Fitzgibbon Goals 1/1	Stadium: ANZ Stadium; Attendance: 21,596; Referee: Sean Hampstead

=== 2009 ===
25 April 2009 Round 7	St. George Illawarra Dragons	29–0	Sydney Roosters	Sydney
3:15 PM	Jamie Soward (2); Brett Morris (1); Jason Nightingale (1); Jamie Soward Goals 6/6; Jamie Soward Field Goals 1/1	Statistics		Stadium: Sydney Football Stadium; Attendance: 28,926; Referee: Shayne Hayne, Tony De Las Heras

=== 2010 ===
25 April 2010 Round 7	St. George Illawarra Dragons	28–6	Sydney Roosters	Sydney
4:00 PM	Matt Cooper (2); Trent Merrin (1); Brett Morris (1); Luke Priddis (1); Jamie Soward Goals 4/5	Statistics	Mitchell Aubusson; Todd Carney Goals 1/2	Stadium: Sydney Football Stadium; Attendance: 36,212; Referee: Tony Archer, Alan Shortall

=== 2011 ===
25 April 2011 Round 7	St. George Illawarra Dragons	24–10	Sydney Roosters	Sydney
4:00 PM	Darius Boyd (1); Ben Creagh (1); Mark Gasnier (1); Brett Morris (1); Jamie Soward Goals 4/4	Statistics	Justin Carney (1); Mitchell Pearce (1); Braith Anasta Goals 1/2	Stadium: Sydney Football Stadium; Attendance: 34,976; Referee: Jared Maxwell, Alan Shortall

=== 2012 ===
25 April 2012 Round 8	St. George Illawarra Dragons	28–26	Sydney Roosters	Sydney
4:00 PM	Ben Creagh (2); Matt Cooper (1); Matt Prior (1); Michael Weyman (1); Jamie Soward Goals 3/4; Ben Hornby Goals 1/1	Statistics	Braith Anasta (1); Aidan Guerra (1); Anthony Minichiello (1); Mitchell Pearce (1); Braith Anasta Goals 4/5	Stadium: Allianz Stadium; Attendance: 40,164; Referee: Matt Cecchin, Ben Cummins

=== 2013 ===
25 April 2013 Round 7	Sydney Roosters	34–10	St. George Illawarra Dragons	Sydney
4:00 PM	Michael Jennings (2); Mitchell Aubusson (1); Martin Kennedy (1); Anthony Minichiello (1); Daniel Tupou (1); James Maloney Goals 5/6	Statistics	Matt Cooper (1); Jason Nightingale (1); Jamie Soward Goals 1/2	Stadium: Allianz Stadium; Attendance: 40,752; Referee: Shayne Hayne, Gerard Sutton

=== 2014 ===
25 April 2014 Round 8	Sydney Roosters	34–14	St. George Illawarra Dragons	Sydney
4:00 PM	Boyd Cordner (1); Jake Friend (1); Aidan Guerra (1); Shaun Kenny-Dowall (1); Anthony Minichiello (1); Daniel Tupou (1); James Maloney Goals 5/5	Statistics	Gerard Beale (1); Ben Creagh (1); Nathan Green (1); Gareth Widdop Goals 1/3	Stadium: Allianz Stadium; Attendance: 38,784; Referee: Shayne Hayne, Gavin Morris

=== 2015 ===
25 April 2015 Round 8	St. George Illawarra Dragons	14–12	Sydney Roosters	Sydney
4:00 PM	Peter Mata'utia (1); Mitch Rein (1); Gareth Widdop Goals 3/4	Statistics	Shaun Kenny-Dowall (1); Roger Tuivasa-Sheck (1); James Maloney Goals 2/2	Stadium: Allianz Stadium; Attendance: 35,110; Referee: Gerard Sutton, Gavin Reynolds

=== 2016 ===
25 April 2016 Round 8	St. George Illawarra Dragons	20–18	Sydney Roosters	Sydney
4:00 PM	Peter Mata'utia (1); Mitch Rein (1); Gareth Widdop Goals 3/4	Statistics	Shaun Kenny-Dowall (1); Roger Tuivasa-Sheck (1); James Maloney Goals 2/2	Stadium: Allianz Stadium; Attendance: 35,110; Referee: Gerard Sutton, Gavin Reynolds

=== 2017 ===
25 April 2017 Round 8	Sydney Roosters	13–12	St. George Illawarra Dragons	Sydney
4:00 PM	Blake Ferguson (1); Mitchell Pearce (1); Michael Gordon Goals 2/3; Mitchell Pearce Field goal (1)	Statistics	Joel Thompson (1); Nene Macdonald (1); Gareth Widdop Goals 1/1; Josh Dugan Goals 1/1	Stadium: Allianz Stadium; Attendance: 40,864; Referee: Matt Cecchin, Alan Shortall

=== 2018 ===
25 April 2018 Round 8	St. George Illawarra Dragons	24–8	Sydney Roosters	Sydney
4:10 PM	Blake Ferguson (1); Mitchell Pearce (1); Michael Gordon Goals 2/3	Statistics	Joel Thompson (1); Nene Macdonald (1); Gareth Widdop Goals 1/1; Josh Dugan Goals 1/1	Stadium: Allianz Stadium; Attendance: 41,142; Referee: Matt Cecchin, Alan Shortall

=== 2019 ===
25 April 2019 Round 7	Sydney Roosters	20–10	St. George Illawarra Dragons	Sydney
4:00 PM	Latrell Mitchell (1); Angus Crichton (1); Siosiua Taukeiaho (1); Latrell Mitchell Goals 3/3; Latrell Mitchell Penalty Goals 1/1	Statistics	Matt Dufty (1); Zac Lomax (1); Zac Lomax Goals 1/2	Stadium: Sydney Cricket Ground; Attendance: 38,414; Referee: Ben Cummins, Grant Atkins

=== 2020 ===
6 August 2020 Round 13	St. George Illawarra Dragons	16–24	Sydney Roosters	Wollongong
7:50 PM	Zac Lomax (2); Matthew Dufty (1); Zac Lomax Goals 2/3	Statistics	Joseph Manu (2); Mitchell Aubusson (1); Sitili Tupouniua (1); Luke Keary (1); Sio Siua Taukeiaho Goals 2/3	Stadium: WIN Stadium; Attendance: 2,141; Referee: Ashley Klein

=== 2021 ===
25 April 2021 Round 7	Sydney Roosters	34–10	St. George Illawarra Dragons	Sydney
4:05 PM	Daniel Tupou (1); Sitili Tupouniua (1); Nat Butcher (1); Sam Walker (1); Lindsay Collins (1); Joseph Manu (1); Sam Walker Goals 5/7	Statistics	Tariq Sims (1); Mikaele Ravalawa (1); Zac Lomax Goals 1/2	Stadium: Sydney Cricket Ground; Attendance: 37,620; Referee: Ashley Klein

=== 2022 ===
25 April 2022 Round 7	St. George Illawarra Dragons	14–12	Sydney Roosters	Sydney
4:05 PM	Francis Molo (1); Jaydn Su'a (1); Zac Lomax Goals 3/3	Statistics	Sitili Tupouniua (1); Joseph Manu (1); Sam Walker Goals 2/2	Stadium: Sydney Cricket Ground; Attendance: 35,273; Referee: Adam Gee

=== 2023 ===
25 April 2023 Round 8	Sydney Roosters	27–26	St. George Illawarra Dragons	Sydney
4:05 PM	Tries: James Tedesco 4'; Victor Radley 20'; Luke Keary 28'; Joseph Manu 45' Goals: Joseph-Aukuso Suaalii (5/5) 5', 21', 24', 30', 46' Field Goals: Luke Keary 73' (1pt)	Statistics	Tries: Tautau Moga (3) 15', 50', 58'; Jack Bird 33'; Tyrell Sloan 52'; Goals: Zac Lomax (3/5) 16', 33', 54'	Stadium: Allianz Stadium; Attendance: 40,191; Referee: Adam Gee

=== 2024 ===
25 April 2024 Round 8	St. George Illawarra Dragons	18–60	Sydney Roosters	Sydney
4:05 PM	Tries: Jaydn Su'a 5'; Jack de Belin 50'; Tom Eisenhuth 67'; Goals: Zac Lomax (3/3) 6', 51', 68'	Statistics	Tries: Dominic Young 10'; Angus Crichton 16'; Joseph Manu (2) 26', 59'; Sam Walker 32'; Nat Butcher (2) 36', 71'; Luke Keary 55'; James Tedesco 62'; Joseph Sua'ali'i 76'; Goals: Sam Walker (10/10) 12', 17', 28', 33', 38', 57', 61', 63', 73', 77'	Stadium: Allianz Stadium; Attendance: 40,727; Referee: Adam Gee

=== 2025 ===
25 April 2025 Round 8	Sydney Roosters	46-18	St. George Illawarra Dragons	Sydney
4:00 PM	Tries: Sandon Smith (2) 2', 35'; Mark Nawaqanitawase 16'; Blake Steep 49'; James Tedesco (2) 55', 76'; Hugo Savala 78'; Goals: Sandon Smith (7/8) 4', 17', 32', 36', 56', 59', 79'; Hugo Savala (2/2) 47', 50'	Statistics	Tries: Sione Finau 7'; Kyle Flanagan 52'; Tyrell Sloan 73'; Goals: Valentine Holmes (3/3) 8', 53', 74'	Stadium: Allianz Stadium; Attendance: 41,021; Referee: Todd Smith

== Head-to-head ==
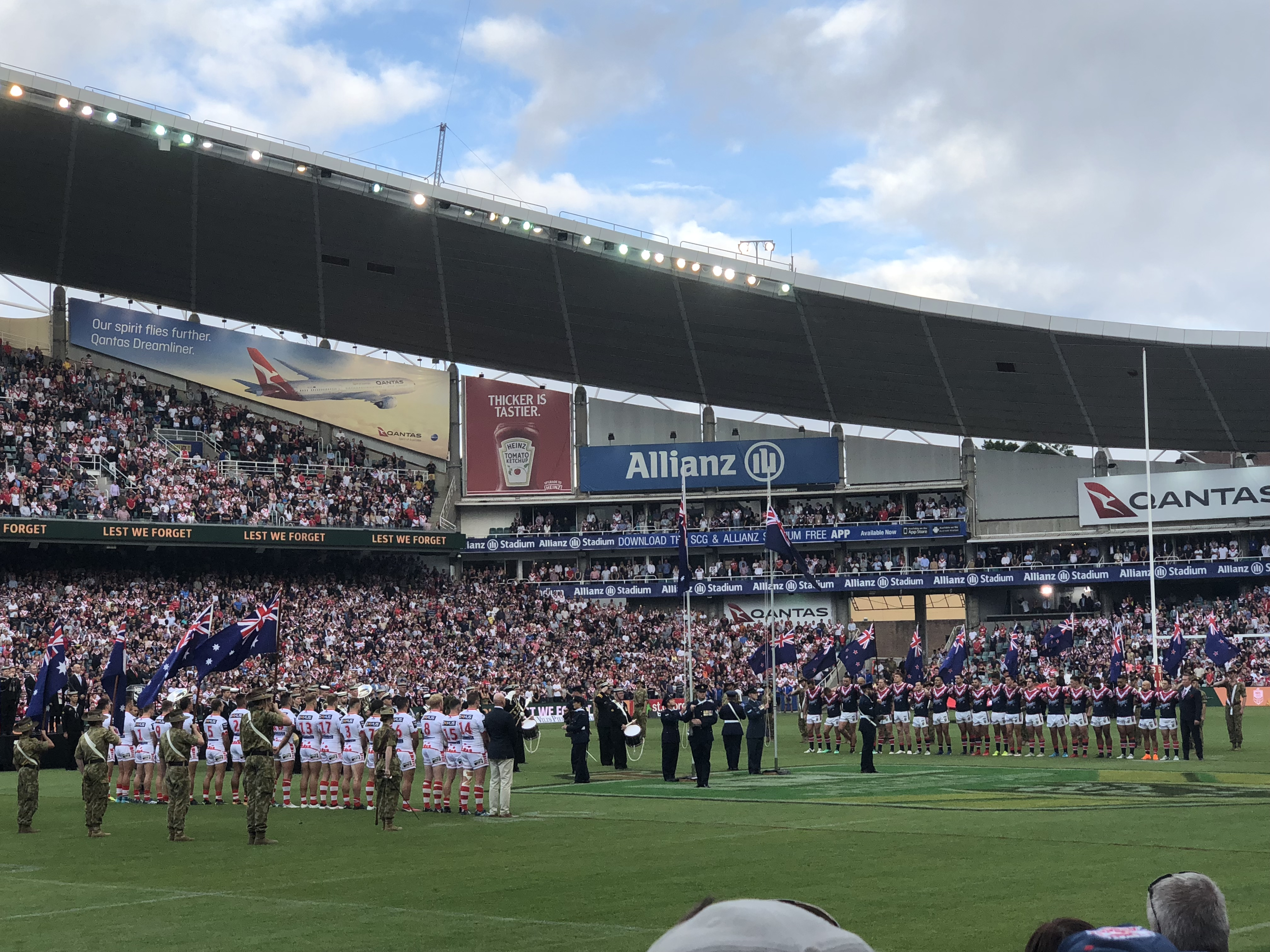
The pre-match formalities taking place in 2018.

Team	Played	Games won	Games lost	Draws	Cups	PF	PA	PD
St. George Illawarra Dragons	25	12	13	0	12	453	592	-139
Sydney Roosters	25	13	12	0	13	592	453	+139

== Ashton-Collier Medal ==
In 2013, the Ashton-Collier Spirit of ANZAC Medal was introduced as the award for player of the match. The award was named in honour of Ferris Ashton and Bill Collier, World War II veterans and former players of Eastern Suburbs and St. George respectively. A previous award, simply titled the Spirit of ANZAC Medal, was awarded between 2010 and 2012. Winners were Dragons players Darius Boyd (2010 and 2011) and Ben Hornby (2012).

Year	Recipient	Team	Position
2013	Boyd Cordner	Sydney Roosters	Second-row
2014	Jake Friend	Sydney Roosters	Hooker
2015	Benji Marshall	St. George Illawarra Dragons	Halfback
2016	Gareth Widdop	St. George Illawarra Dragons	Five-eighth
2017	Mitchell Pearce	Sydney Roosters	Halfback
2018	Tyson Frizell	St. George Illawarra Dragons	Second-row
2019	Boyd Cordner	Sydney Roosters	Second-row
2020	Not awarded		
2021	Sam Walker	Sydney Roosters	Halfback
2022	Ben Hunt	St George Illawarra Dragons	Halfback
2023	Luke Keary	Sydney Roosters	Halfback
2024	Sam Walker	Sydney Roosters	Halfback
2025	Sandon Smith	Sydney Roosters	Five-eighth

== See also ==
- Rivalries in the National Rugby League
