= St. George Illawarra Dragons Honours =

This is a list of the St. George Illawarra Dragons honours since their formation in 1999. They have won one premiership, one World Cub Challenge and two minor premierships, amongst other team and individual honours. The Dragons were formed by the merger of the St. George Dragons and the Illawarra Steelers. The honours of their predecessors aren’t counted in this list.

== Men's team honours ==
=== Premierships (1) ===
St. George Illawarra Dragons have won one Grand Final out of 2 attempts. Meanwhile, their predecessors St. George won 15 while Illawarra won 0.

Year	Opponent	Stadium	Score	Attendance	Source
2010	Sydney Roosters	Stadium Australia	32–8	82,334	

=== Runners-up (1) ===
Year	Opponent	Stadium	Score	Attendance	Source
1999	Melbourne Storm	Stadium Australia	20–18	107,999	

=== Minor Premierships (2) ===
St. George Illawarra Dragons finished first in 2009 and 2010 to claim consecutive minor premierships.

Year	Pld	W	D	L	B	PF	PA	PD	Pts	Finals Result
2009	24	17	0	7	2	548	329	+219	38	Semi Finals
2010	24	17	0	7	2	518	299	+219	38	Premiers

=== Finals Appearances (12) ===
1999, 2001, 2002, 2004, 2005, 2006, 2008, 2009, 2010, 2011, 2015 and 2018

=== World Club Challenge (1) ===
Year	Opponent	Stadium	Score	Attendance	Source
2011	Wigan Warriors	DW Stadium	21–15	24,268	

=== NRL Nines ===
==== Runners-up (1) ====
Year	Opponent	Stadium	Score	Attendance	Source
2020	North Queensland Cowboys	HBF Park	23–14	14,738	

== Women's team honours ==
=== Runners-up (2) ===
Year	Opponent	Stadium	Score	Attendance	Source
2019	Brisbane Broncos	Stadium Australia	30–6	—	
2021	Sydney Roosters	Moreton Daly Stadium	16–4	—	

=== NRL Nines ===
==== Champions (1) ====
Year	Opponent	Stadium	Score	Attendance	Source
2020	Brisbane Broncos	HBF Park	28–4	14,738	

== Reserves honours ==
NSW Cup (2) - 2001, 2016

Jersey Flegg Cup (1) - 2005

S.G. Ball Cup (1) - 2019 (Illawarra)

== Individual competition honours ==
=== Dally M Medal ===
Season	Winner
2000	Trent Barrett

=== Dally M Fullback of the Year ===
Season	Winner
2010	Darius Boyd

=== Dally M Winger of the Year ===
Season	Winner
1999	Nathan Blacklock
2000	Nathan Blacklock
2001	Nathan Blacklock

=== Dally M Centre of the Year ===
Season	Winner
2005	Mark Gasnier
2006	Mark Gasnier

=== Dally M Five-Eighth of the Year ===
Season	Winner
2000	Trent Barrett
2009	Jamie Soward
2017	Gareth Widdop

=== Dally M Lock of the Year ===
Season	Winner
2004	Shaun Timmins

=== Dally M Prop of the Year ===
Season	Winner
2005	Luke Bailey

=== Ken Irvine Medal ===
Season	Winner
2000	Nathan Blacklock
2001	Nathan Blacklock
2009	Brett Morris

=== Clive Churchill Medal ===
Season	Winner
2010	Darius Boyd

=== Provan-Summons Medal ===
Season	Winner
2009	Jamie Soward

=== NYC Player of the Year ===
Season	Winner
2009	Beau Henry
2011	Jack de Belin

== Individual club honours ==
=== Player of the Year ===
Year	Men's Winner	Women's Winner
1999	Jamie Ainscough	—
2000	Trent Barrett	—
2001	Jason Ryles	—
2002	Shaun Timmins	—
2003	Ben Hornby	—
2004	Mathew Head	—
2005	Luke Bailey	—
2006	Mark Gasnier and Jason Ryles	—
2007	Ben Creagh	—
2008	Jason Ryles	—
2009	Ben Creagh	—
2010	Ben Creagh	—
2011	Jason Nightingale	—
2012	Brett Morris	—
2013	Trent Merrin	—
2014	Ben Creagh	—
2015	Leeson Ah Mau	—
2016	Tyson Frizell	—
2017	Gareth Widdop	—
2018	Tariq Sims	Holli Wheeler
2019	Cameron McInnes	Jessica Sergis
2020	Cameron McInnes	Shaylee Bent
2021	Ben Hunt	Emma Tonegato and Elsie Albert
2022	Ben Hunt	Holli Wheeler
2023	Blake Lawrie	
2024	Jaydn Su'A	
2025	Clinton Gutherson	Madi Mulhall
