= List of St. George Illawarra Dragons records =

This article shows all records, players and match records, from the St. George Illawarra Dragons Rugby League Football Club.

== Team ==
=== Biggest wins ===
Margin	Score	Opponent	Venue	Date
54	54–0	Auckland Warriors	WIN Stadium	6 May 2000
50	50–0	Wests Tigers	Kogarah Oval	20 June 2004
46	50–4	Melbourne Storm	WIN Stadium	4 June 2000
46	48–2	Newcastle Knights	WIN Stadium	4 April 2004
46	54–8	Gold Coast Titans	Clive Berghofer Stadium	25 March 2018

=== Biggest losses ===
Margin	Score	Opponent	Venue	Date
60	10–70	Melbourne Storm	MCG	3 March 2000
50	6–56	Dolphins	Suncorp Stadium	6th June 2025
48	6–54	Newcastle Knights	WIN Stadium	8 April 2006
46	4–50	North Queensland Cowboys	Dairy Farmers Stadium	29 April 2000
46	16–62	Sydney Roosters	Allianz Stadium	25 April 2026

=== Most consecutive wins ===
- 9 – (27 March 2011 – 29 May 2011)
- 8 – (17 July 2005 – 10 September 2005)
- 7 – (17 May 2008 – 5 July 2008)

=== Most consecutive losses ===
- 15 – (15 August 2025 – 31 May 2026)
- 8 – (16 July 2021 – 4 September 2021)
- 7 – (8 June 2015 – 2 August 2015)

=== Biggest comeback ===
- Trailed Manly 34–10 after 57 minutes to win 36–34 at WIN Jubilee Stadium (19 August 2004)

=== Worst collapse ===
- Led Melbourne 14–0 at halftime to lose 20–18 at Stadium Australia (1999 Grand Final)
- Led Sydney 14–0 after 53 minutes to lose 18–14 at Aussie Stadium (16 July 2004)
- Led Canterbury 14–0 after 36 minutes to lose 28–24 at WIN Stadium (28 July 2007)
- Led South Sydney 20–0 after 15 minutes, then 24–22 with 4 minutes remaining to lose 34–24 (31 July 2011)

== Individual ==
(updated as of Round 10, 2023)

=== Most games for club ===
- 273, Ben Hornby (2000–2012)
- 270, Ben Creagh (2003–2016)
- 266, Jason Nightingale (2007–2018)
- 252, Jack de Belin (2011–2018, 2021–2025)
- 243, Matt Cooper (2000–2013)
- 209, Dean Young (2003–2012)
- 174, Mark Gasnier (2000–2008, 2010–2011)
- 169, Brett Morris (2006–2014)
- 165, Tyson Frizell (2013–2020)
- 156, Jason Ryles (2000–2008)

=== Most points for club ===
- 977 (39 tries, 398 goals, 25 field goals), Jamie Soward (2007–2013)
- 912 (33 tries, 387 goals, 6 field goals), Gareth Widdop (2014–2019)
- 831 (49 tries, 315 goals, 3 field goals), Zac Lomax (2018–2024)
- 517 (30 tries, 198 goals, 1 field goal), Mark Riddell (2001–2004)
- 496 (124 tries), Matt Cooper (2000–2013)
- 448 (112 tries), Brett Morris (2006–2014)
- 440 (110 tries), Jason Nightingale (2007–2018)

==== In a season ====
- 228 – Jamie Soward in 24 games, 2009
- 205 – Gareth Widdop in 22 games, 2018
- 197 – Jamie Soward in 24 games, 2010
- 191 – Gareth Widdop in 21 games, 2017
- 182 – Gareth Widdop in 21 games, 2015
- 178 – Zac Lomax in 20 games, 2020
- 167 – Zac Lomax in 24 games, 2022
- 166 – Mark Riddell in 24 games, 2003
- 162 – Wayne Bartrim in 25 games, 1999
- 157 – Jamie Soward in 23 games, 2011
- 137 – Gareth Widdop in 24 games, 2014

==== In a game ====
- 32 – Zac Lomax (3 tries, 10 goals)
- 22 – Amos Roberts (1 try, 9 goals)
- 22 – Jamie Soward (1 try, 9 goals)
- 22 – Gareth Widdop (1 try, 9 goals)
- 22 – Gareth Widdop (1 try, 9 goals)
- 22 – Zac Lomax (2 tries, 7 goals)
- 21 – Jamie Soward (2 tries, 6 goals, 1 field goal)
- 20 – Aaron Gorrell (1 try, 8 goals)
- 20 – Jamie Soward (1 try, 8 goals)
- 20 – Gareth Widdop (1 try, 8 goals)

=== Most tries for club ===
- 124, Matt Cooper (2000–2013)
- 112, Brett Morris (2006–2014)
- 110, Jason Nightingale (2007–2018)
- 100, Nathan Blacklock (1999–2004)
- 92, Mark Gasnier (2000–2008, 2010–2011)
- 59, Ben Hornby (2000–2012)
- 54, Ben Creagh (2003–2016)
- 49, Zac Lomax (2018–2024)
- 47, Trent Barrett (1999–2006)

==== In a season ====
- 27 – Nathan Blacklock in 28 games, 2001
- 25 – Brett Morris in 24 games, 2009
- 25 – Nathan Blacklock in 26 games, 2000
- 24 – Nathan Blacklock in 26 games, 1999
- 20 – Colin Best in 26 games, 2005
- 20 – Brett Morris in 23 games, 2010
- 19 – Mikaele Ravalawa in 18 games, 2023
- 18 – Lee Hookey in 25 games, 2002
- 17 – Matt Cooper in 23 games, 2004
- 17 – Anthony Mundine in 23 games, 1999

==== In a game ====
- 4 – Matt Cooper (2004)
- 4 – Mark Gasnier (2004)
- 4 – Brett Morris (2009)
- 4 – Mikaele Ravalawa (2023)

== See also ==
- List of NRL records
