= 2008 State of Origin series =

Australian rugby league series

- Won by: Queensland (13th title)
- Series margin: 2–1
- Points scored: 84
- Attendance: 198,787 (ave. 66,262 per match)
- Top points scorer(s): Johnathan Thurston (20)
- Top try scorer(s): Israel Folau (4)

The 2008 State of Origin series was the 27th year that the annual best-of-three series of interstate rugby league football matches between the Queensland and New South Wales representative teams was contested entirely under 'state of origin' selection rules. At its commencement each side had won twelve Origin series with two series drawn.

Queensland's Mal Meninga was to coach against a former Canberra Raiders teammate in the Melbourne Storm's premiership-winning coach, Craig Bellamy who was to make his debut in charge of New South Wales against a number of his in-form Melbourne players. New South Wales took a 1–0 series lead with a convincing victory in Game I on 21 May 2008. After some key personnel changes, Queensland then achieved a record 30-point margin to win Game II on 11 June 2008 to level, and on 2 July won Game III 16 – 10 to take the series 2–1 and edge one ahead in the cumulative series tally.

The series marked Mal Meninga's third as Queensland coach and also his third consecutive series victory. Johnathan Thurston was judged the player of the series. The 2008 series also set new nationwide television audience records for State of Origin.

== Game I ==
The New South Wales side came to Origin I well prepared by Craig Bellamy, brought in to coach against Meninga, who was captaining Canberra in the 1990 NSWRL season's Grand final victory when Bellamy played for them from the interchange bench. Six of Meninga's Maroons were members of Bellamy's club, the Melbourne Storm. Queensland were missing their injured captain and playmaker Darren Lockyer but were spoilt for choice for fullbacks with Melbourne's Billy Slater and the Broncos' Karmichael Hunt in tremendous season form. Maroons selectors opted to experiment with Hunt at five-eighth.

Wednesday, 21 May 2008

New South Wales	18–10	Queensland
Anthony Quinn (8 – 2t); Brett Stewart (4 – 1t); Anthony Laffranchi (4 – 1t); Craig Fitzgibbon (2 −1g)		Brent Tate (4 – 1t); Israel Folau (4 – 1t); Johnathan Thurston (2 – 1g)

ANZ Stadium, Sydney
Attendance: 67,620
Referee: Tony Archer
Player of the Match: Greg Bird

The Blues forwards ran at the Queensland playmakers and Cameron Smith and Hunt were forced to do a mountain of defence. Steady and deep kicks from Blues debutant Peter Wallace (a late call up to the side during the week following the withdrawal of Kurt Gidley) kept Slater returning from deep in his territory often without easy linkage to his wing supports.

Queensland took a long time to get out of first gear – Thurston's first kick of the night was low and travelled only 35 metres. The Blues however worked the ball through the hands with confidence and began to move it wide early. New South Wales played down their left hand side for the first two tries, both scored by debutant winger Anthony Quinn. One came through the hands with five-eighth Greg Bird, creating space via a cut out pass to Ryan Hoffman. The other resulted from a well executed kick from Peter Wallace.

Queensland scored late in a first half almost devoid of penalties and errors and they made a better showing after half-time with a few breaks and by picking up on some New South Wales errors. However, their efforts came to nothing in the face of an all round defensive effort from the Blues, including a number of try-saving and punishing tackles by try-scorer Quinn supported by his three-quarter teammate Matt Cooper.

Thurston lifted in the second half and threatened with a number of well-paced grubber kicks in- behind but he was marked closely by the man-of-the-match Greg Bird and the vigilant defence of Ryan Hoffman who also kept Folau and Inglis well contained. Slater showed touches of brilliance but at times was outshone by Mark Gasnier who was dangerous all night and had a hand in two Blues tries. Hunt defended heroically throughout but every big tackle he made sapped something from his attacking spark. Eventually the Maroons ran out of steam and another Blues debutant in Anthony Laffranchi crossed in the 68th minute, taking the score to 18–4. Again at the death of the second half Queensland picked up another late try out wide through debutant Folau.

== Game II ==
Queensland made ten positional-personnel changes for Origin II: Boyd debuted as Winger replacing Tate; Tate moved to Centre replacing Hodges (suspended on a tackling charge in the NRL round 11); Thurston moved to Five-eighth after Lockyer was again ruled out unfit after initially being named in the side; Prince was called into the side at Half-back, replacing Thurston; Thaiday moved to the interchange bench; Price back from injury as Prop replacing Webb (dropped); Hunt moved to fullback thus Slater replacing Marsh (dropped) on interchange; Myles swapped with Thaiday to second row; Harrison onto the interchange bench, replacing Lillyman (dropped). New South Wales on the other hand made only four player changes: Turner debuted as winger replacing Hayne (suspended on a tackling charge in NRL round 11); Fitzgibbon moved to starting prop, replacing Cross (injured in game I); Simpson was moved onto the interchange bench for Fitzgibbon; Gidley (who had been named for game I, but suffered an eye injury in the club round prior) replacing Hornby who moved to 18th Man.

Wednesday, 11 June 2008

Queensland	30–0	New South Wales
Johnathan Thurston (14 – 7g); Darius Boyd (8 – 2t); Ben Hannant (4 – 1t); Israel Folau (4 – 1t)

Suncorp Stadium, Brisbane
Attendance: 52,476
Referee: Tony Archer
Player of the Match: Greg Inglis

Darius Boyd on debut scored Queensland's first two tries, and with two penalty goals kicked by Thurston, Queensland held a 16–0 lead at half-time. Another penalty just after the break, then two further converted tries between the 65th and the 70th minute, made it 30–0 to Queensland.

Greg Inglis answered his critics from game I and spoke after the match of "getting one back on Gaz" (referring to having been outshone in game I by Mark Gasnier) with a blistering performance setting up both tries for Boyd from long range beating Gasnier and embarrassing the defence of Blues debutante Steve Turner in the process. The Queensland forwards were consistently up fast in defence and flustered New South Wales. Blues halves Greg Bird and Peter Wallace seemed at times bereft of attacking ideas and whilst Wallace had a reasonable kicking game, the control demonstrated by the pair in game I was not to be seen.

As predicted by the pre-match press, the Blues attack was aimed at Scott Prince wherever possible but he was ably assisted by Brent Tate, defending alongside him. Tate made thirty-three tackles in the game and regularly featured in attacking returns from loose play. Queensland were strong across the park with Johnathan Thurston shining, Israel Folau showing his class and veterans Steve Price and Petero Civoniceva giving tireless service.

For New South Wales, the only flawless performances were by captain Danny Buderus and fullback Brett Stewart, who pulled off a number of solo try-saving tackles. Otherwise the tables were completely turned from game I and Blues had no answers for a Maroons outfit this time perfectly prepared by coach Meninga. Queensland had levelled the series with a 30–0 win, only the second time in history that New South Wales were held scoreless.

The national TV audience peaked at 2.49 million viewers, which was a new record.

== Game III ==
Coming into the decider, Queensland's record at the venue (dating back to 1999) was 1 win, 11 losses and a draw.

Queensland made no changes to their lineup for the decider while New South Wales made seven: Hayne returned from suspension and replaced Turner on the Wing; Cross, back from injury replaced Simpson; Anasta and Pearce formed a new halves pairing replacing the injured Bird and Wallace; Monaghan replaced Gasnier out with a back injury; Fitzgibbon moved to the Second-row and Mason to Prop.

Wednesday, 2 July 2008

New South Wales	10–16	Queensland
Craig Fitzgibbon (6 – 3g); Matt Cooper (4 – 1t)		Israel Folau (8 – 2t); Johnathan Thurston (4 – 2g); Billy Slater(4 – 1t)

ANZ Stadium, Sydney
Attendance: 78,751
Referee: Tony Archer
Player of the Match: Israel Folau

In starting, Danny Buderus beat two Blues standing records – Harragon's for consecutive matches and Fittler's for most games as captain. Much of the media build-up focused on the match being his state representative farewell, as well as Mitchell Pearce's debut and Braith Anasta's State of Origin comeback. Blues' utility Kurt Gidley had been shuffled at the last minute into the starting line-up over Brett Stewart, resulting in formal pre-match protest from Queensland. The decision to bench Stewart was perplexing, who was arguably the Blues' best in game 1 and 2.

After one minute of Game III a tackle was made on New South Wales forward Ben Cross by the Queenslanders which sparked a brawl. A penalty was awarded to the Blues and Craig Fitzgibbon kicked it, putting NSW in front 2 – 0. In the fifth minute the Maroons were advancing on the Blues' line when Queensland halfback Scott Prince put a high kick up to the right corner which Bues winger Anthony Quinn failed to catch, allowing Israel Folau to grab the ball and simply fall over the try-line. Johnathan Thurston missed the conversion, leaving the score at 2 – 4 in favour of the Maroons. Ten minutes later Queensland were a man down after Prince's forearm was broken in a tackle and the New South Welshmen capitalised, working the ball up close to the Maroons' line and out to left centre Matt Cooper to stretch out through the defence and plant the ball. Fitzgibbon added the extras to give his team an 8 – 4 lead. In the twenty-second minute, the Queenslanders were again attacking close to the Blues' try-line when from in front of the posts Thurston put a kick up high and across to Folau's wing. Folau, coming through at speed, leapt above his opposite number to grab the ball and as he fell awkwardly back down, managed to ground it one-handed behind his head in what was a remarkable effort. The conversion was missed by Thurston so the scores were level at 8 – 8. A few minutes later, New South Wales hooker Danny Buderus ran from dummy half, catching the Maroons' defence off-side and gaining his team a penalty, which Fitzgibbon successfully kicked, giving the Blues a 10 – 8 lead. No more points were scored before half time.

New South Wales started the second half with repeat sets of six in Queensland's half of the field. A loose ball in the Maroons' in-goal was dived on by Anasta, but the video referee found that it was a penalty to Queensland. The maroons' following set of six ended with another penalty to them in attacking position, with Thurston kicking the two points to level at 10 – 10. Queensland forward Nate Myles was lucky not to be sent off (but was later suspended for 6 weeks) for a tackle in the forty-eighth minute which upended Ben Cross and resulted in another minor scuffle and a penalty to the Blues, but the Maroons withstood NSW's attack. A few minutes later the game was halted when Queensland forward Michael Crocker was knocked out as Mitchell Pearce's attempted clearing kick sent the ball into the back of his head. Just at the sixty-seven minute mark Thurston, from within his own half, got the ball at first-receiver and threw a dummy, slicing through the defensive line before passing to Billy Slater running through in support to score the match-winning try under the posts. The conversion was simple and Queensland regained the lead at 10 – 16. In the final minutes the Blues attacked the Maroons' line repeatedly but could not break through and Queensland had won their third series in a row, replicating "three-peats" achieved in 1982, 1983, 1984 and 1987, 1988, 1989.

The national TV audience peaked at more than 2.5 million, breaking the record set in the last game.

== Teams ==
New South Wales Blues

Position	Game 1	Game 2	Game 3
Fullback	Brett Stewart		Kurt Gidley
Wing	Jarryd Hayne	Steve Turner	Jarryd Hayne
Centre	Matt Cooper		
Centre	Mark Gasnier		Joel Monaghan
Wing	Anthony Quinn		
Five-eighth	Greg Bird		Braith Anasta
Halfback	Peter Wallace		Mitchell Pearce
Prop	Craig Fitzgibbon		Ben Cross
Hooker	Danny Buderus (c)		
Prop	Brett White		
Second Row	Ryan Hoffman		
Second Row	Willie Mason		Craig Fitzgibbon
Lock	Paul Gallen		
Interchange	Anthony Laffranchi		
Interchange	Anthony Tupou		
Interchange	Ben Cross	Steve Simpson	Willie Mason
Interchange	Ben Hornby	Kurt Gidley	Brett Stewart
Coach	Craig Bellamy		

Queensland Maroons

Position	Game 1	Game 2	Game 3
Fullback	Billy Slater	Karmichael Hunt	
Wing	Brent Tate	Darius Boyd	
Centre	Greg Inglis		
Centre	Justin Hodges	Brent Tate	
Wing	Israel Folau		
Five-eighth	Karmichael Hunt	Johnathan Thurston	
Halfback	Johnathan Thurston	Scott Prince	
Prop	Carl Webb	Steve Price	
Hooker	Cameron Smith (c)		
Prop	Petero Civoniceva		
Second Row	Michael Crocker		Nate Myles
Second Row	Sam Thaiday	Ashley Harrison	
Lock	Dallas Johnson		
Interchange	PJ Marsh	Billy Slater	
Interchange	Jacob Lillyman	Sam Thaiday	
Interchange	Ben Hannant		
Interchange	Nate Myles		Michael Crocker
Coach	Mal Meninga		

^{1} – Injury replacement (does not play).

== See also ==
- 2008 NRL season
