= 2006 State of Origin series =

Australian rugby league series

- Won by: Queensland (11th title)
- Series margin: 2-1
- Points scored: 99
- Attendance: 180,074 (ave. 60,025 per match)
- Player of the series: Darren Lockyer
- Top points scorer(s): Johnathan Thurston (14)
- Top try scorer(s): Adam Mogg (3)

The 2006 State of Origin series was the 25th year that the annual best-of-three series of interstate rugby league football matches between the Queensland and New South Wales representative teams was contested entirely under 'state of origin' selection rules. It was decided in three matches which drew a total attendance of 180,074. Queensland won the series 2-1, their first outright series victory since 2001 and the first in their record-breaking run of eight consecutive series wins. Prior to game one there was growing concern about the long term future of State of Origin, many commentators were beginning to wonder if Queensland would ever win another series after three consecutive New South Wales victories.

== Game I ==
Craig Gower was originally picked for the New South Wales side at halfback but pulled out because of injury. Matt Orford was forced to turn down selection as cover for Gower, also because of injury. Both Andrew Johns and Trent Barrett turned down coming out of retirement to play in the fixture so eventually Brett Finch was selected to start at halfback in jersey no. 20 for New South Wales as a last-minute inclusion.

The Queensland selectors picked a total of seven State of Origin debutants for game I.

Wednesday, 24 May 2006

New South Wales	17–16	Queensland
Brett Finch (5 - 1t,1fg); Brett Hodgson (4 - 2g); Matt King (4 - 1t); Willie Mason (4 - 1t)	(Report)	(8 - 2t) Greg Inglis (4 - 1t) Steven Bell (4 - 2g) Johnathan Thurston

Telstra Stadium, Sydney
Attendance: 72,773
Referee: Sean Hampstead
Player of the Match: Willie Mason

Game I was played at Telstra Stadium, Sydney, and won by New South Wales 17-16, following a late field goal by NSW late-choice halfback, Brett Finch.

== Game II ==
For Queensland, Origin debutant Adam Mogg replaced the injured Greg Inglis

Wednesday, 14 June 2006

Queensland	30–6	New South Wales
Johnathan Thurston (10 - 5g); Adam Mogg (8 - 2t); Shaun Berrigan (4 - 1t); Justin Hodges (4 - 1t); Carl Webb (4 - 1t)	(Report)	(4 - 1t) Timana Tahu (2 - 1g) Brett Hodgson

Suncorp Stadium, Brisbane
Attendance: 52,468
Referee: Steve Clark
Player of the Match: Darren Lockyer

In game II, Queensland levelled the series at home at Suncorp Stadium, Brisbane, with a commanding 30-6 victory.

== Game III ==
Justin Hodges was ruled out of the Queensland side for game III after he re-tore his hamstring and was replaced by Josh Hannay. Steven Bell was also ruled out after he sustained a fractured cheekbone in game II.

After the heavy loss in game II the New South Wales selectors made five changes, bringing in Matt Cooper, Paul Gallen, Craig Gower, Luke O'Donnell and Ben Hornby as well as moving Matt King into the centres, Mark Gasnier to five-eighth and Luke Bailey into the starting side.

Wednesday, 5 July 2006

New South Wales	14–16	Queensland
Eric Grothe, Jr. (8 - 2t); Matt King (4 - 1t); Brett Hodgson (2 - 1g)	(Report)	(4 - 1t) Darren Lockyer (4 - 1t) Adam Mogg (4 - 1t) Brent Tate (4 - 2g) Clinton Schifcofske

Telstra Dome, Melbourne
Attendance: 54,833
Referee: Steven Clark
Player of the Match: Brent Tate

Game III was held at Telstra Dome, Melbourne, and was the first decider played at a neutral venue. Queensland were trailing 14-4 with ten minutes remaining, however scored two converted tries in the space of five minutes – first Brent Tate's long-range try after a line break from Thurston and then Lockyer intercepting a Hodgson pass inside New South Wales' own half – to take the match and series, winning 16-14.

- The Wally Lewis Medal for player of the series was awarded to Darren Lockyer
- The Ron McAuliffe Medal for Queensland player of the series was awarded to Darren Lockyer

== New South Wales squad ==
Position	Game 1	Game 2	Game 3
Fullback	Brett Hodgson		
Wing	Matt King		Timana Tahu
Centre	Mark Gasnier		Matt King
Centre	Timana Tahu		Matt Cooper
Wing	Eric Grothe, Jr.		
Five-Eighth	Braith Anasta		Mark Gasnier
Halfback	Brett Finch		Craig Gower
Prop	Willie Mason		
Hooker	Danny Buderus (c)		
Prop	Brent Kite		Luke Bailey
Second Row	Steve Simpson		
Second Row	Nathan Hindmarsh		
Lock	Luke O'Donnell	Andrew Ryan	Luke O'Donnell
Interchange	Craig Wing		Paul Gallen
Interchange	Steve Menzies		
Interchange	Mark O'Meley		
Interchange	Andrew Ryan	Luke Bailey	Ben Hornby
Coach	Graham Murray		

== Queensland squad ==
Position	Game 1	Game 2	Game 3
Fullback	Matt Bowen	Karmichael Hunt	Clinton Schifcofske
Wing	Steven Bell		Rhys Wesser
Centre	Justin Hodges		Josh Hannay
Centre	Brent Tate		
Wing	Greg Inglis	Adam Mogg	
Five-Eighth	Darren Lockyer (c)		
Halfback	Johnathan Thurston		
Prop	Steve Price		
Hooker	Cameron Smith		
Prop	Petero Civoniceva		
Second Row	David Stagg	Nate Myles	
Second Row	Matthew Scott	Carl Webb	
Lock	Dallas Johnson		
Interchange	Shaun Berrigan		
Interchange	Carl Webb	Chris Flannery	
Interchange	Sam Thaiday		
Interchange	Nate Myles	Jacob Lillyman	Tonie Carroll
Coach	Mal Meninga		

== See also ==
- 2006 NRL season
