= 2004 State of Origin series =

Australian rugby league series

- Won by: New South Wales (11th title)
- Series margin: 2–1
- Points scored: 107
- Attendance: 203,309 (ave. 67,770 per match)
- Player of the series: Craig Fitzgibbon
- Top points scorer(s): Craig Fitzgibbon (20)
- Top try scorer(s): Billy Slater (3)

The 2004 State of Origin series was the 23rd time that the annual three-game series between the Queensland and New South Wales representative rugby league football teams was contested entirely under 'state of origin' selection rules.

A pre-series Blues mobile phone scandal, Brad Fittler's comeback, a Golden point outcome in Game I and an extraordinary Billy Slater try showed that State of Origin's ability to create memorable football moments was as strong as ever after 25 years of the concept. The New South Wales' Game III victory saw a match-up in the respective cumulative tallies at 35 wins apiece, continuing a recurring trend where any push toward dominance by one side is soon countered by the other. The Ron McAuliffe Medal for Queensland player of the series was awarded to Steve Price.

== Game I ==
New South Wales players Anthony Minichiello and Mark Gasnier were dropped following a drunken incident during the Blues' training camp when it was made public that Gasnier had left a lewd message on a female acquaintance's phone.

Wednesday, 26 May 2004

New South Wales	9–8	Queensland
Shaun Timmins (5 - 1t, 1fg); Craig Fitzgibbon (4 - 2g)	(Report)	(4 - 1t) Brent Tate (4 - 1t) Scott Prince

Telstra Stadium, Sydney
Attendance: 68,344
Referee: Sean Hampstead
Player of the Match: Shaun Timmins

Game one featured the first ever Golden point decision in State of Origin football in the very first game where the ruling became available. With scores locked at 8-all and three minutes of extra time played, St George Illawarra Dragons player Shaun Timmins, who had returned to top-class and representative football against unlikely odds after two career-threatening knee injuries and operations, stepped up and kicked a 37-metre left-foot field goal to steal victory for New South Wales. Blues halfback Craig Gower had already missed three earlier field goal attempts, was struggling with a knee injury and was closely marked by Queensland at every kick opportunity so it was left to Timmins to create his own moment of Origin folklore.

== Game II ==
Game II had plenty of hype surrounding it after Blues coach Phil Gould coaxed Brad Fittler out of representative retirement to spearhead the Blues campaign. First game hero Timmins was missing through injury as was Gower and next choice half-backs Trent Barrett and Brett Kimmorley. This left Sydney Roosters number seven Brett Finch to make his Origin debut alongside his club captain Fittler at five-eighth.

Wednesday, 16 June 2004

Queensland	22–18	New South Wales
Billy Slater (8 - 2t); Cameron Smith (4 - 2g); Dane Carlaw (4 - 1t); Willie Tonga (4 - 1t); Scott Prince (2 - 1g)	(Report)	(8 - 2t) Timana Tahu (6 - 3g) Craig Fitzgibbon (4 - 1t) Luke Rooney

Suncorp Stadium, Brisbane
Attendance: 52,478
Referee: Sean Hampstead
Player of the Match: Billy Slater

Suncorp Stadium proved to be a graveyard for the Blues thanks to one of the greatest Origin tries ever seen. 20-year-old Billy Slater, a former track work jockey who had burst onto the rugby league scene in 2003, stormed onto a Darren Lockyer grubber kick from halfway before chipping over the top of Blues fullback Anthony Minichiello, chasing, regathering and scoring in the same instant.

== Game III ==
Gould gambled by making six changes to the side which had played in game II.

Wednesday, 7 July 2004

New South Wales	36–14	Queensland
Mark Gasnier (10 - 2t,1g); Craig Fitzgibbon (10- 5g); Anthony Minichiello (4 - 1t); Luke Rooney (4 - 1t); Brad Fittler (4 - 1t); Trent Barrett (4 - 1t)	(Report)	(6 - 3g) Cameron Smith (4 - 1t) Matt Bowen (4 - 1t) Billy Slater

Telstra Stadium, Sydney
Attendance: 82,487
Referee: Paul Simpkins
Player of the Match: Craig Fitzgibbon

In Game III, the Blues recalled Trent Barrett to the origin squad who along with Brad Fittler led the Blues to a big win over the Maroons. The match was also the swansong for Phil Gould, New South Wales' most successful Origin coach who had commenced his coaching association with Fittler 14 years earlier at the beginning of their respective coaching and playing careers.

Gould called on six St George Illawarra players for Game III. Debutant centres Mark Gasnier and Matt Cooper dominated on the fringes for the Blues and the class of Fittler and Barrett led them to an emphatic 36-14 victory. Fittler scored the last try in the match in his last ever match for the Blues to the delight of his team-mates.

== New South Wales squad ==
Position	Game 1	Game 2	Game 3
Fullback	Ben Hornby	Anthony Minichiello	
Wing	Luke Lewis	Timana Tahu	Luke Lewis
Centre	Michael De Vere	Luke Lewis	Mark Gasnier
Centre	Matt Gidley		Matt Cooper
Wing	Luke Rooney		
Five-eighth	Shaun Timmins	Brad Fittler	
Halfback	Craig Gower	Brett Finch	Trent Barrett
Prop	Ryan O'Hara	Jason Stevens	Jason Ryles
Hooker	Danny Buderus (c)		
Prop	Mark O'Meley		
Second Row	Nathan Hindmarsh		
Second Row	Andrew Ryan		Craig Fitzgibbon
Lock	Craig Fitzgibbon		Shaun Timmins
Interchange	Craig Wing		
Interchange	Trent Waterhouse		Ben Kennedy
Interchange	Brent Kite		
Interchange	Willie Mason		
Coach	Phil Gould		

== Queensland squad ==
Position	Game I	Game II	Game III
Fullback	Rhys Wesser		
Wing	Justin Hodges	Matt Sing	
Centre	Paul Bowman		Brent Tate
Centre	Brent Tate	Willie Tonga	
Wing	Billy Slater		
Five-eighth	Chris Flannery	Darren Lockyer (c)	
Halfback	Scott Prince		
Prop	Shane Webcke (c)	Shane Webcke	
Hooker	Cameron Smith		
Prop	Steve Price		
Second Row	Michael Crocker	Petero Civoniceva	Michael Crocker
Second Row	Dane Carlaw		
Lock	Tonie Carroll		Chris Flannery
Interchange	Ben Ross		
Interchange	Matt Bowen		
Interchange	Petero Civoniceva	Chris Flannery	Petero Civoniceva
Interchange	Travis Norton	Corey Parker	
Coach	Michael Hagan		

== See also ==
- 2004 NRL season

== Sources ==
- Big League's 25 Years of Origin Collectors' Edition, News Magazines, Surry Hills, Sydney
