= Jamie Soward =

Australian rugby league footballer and coach (born 1984)

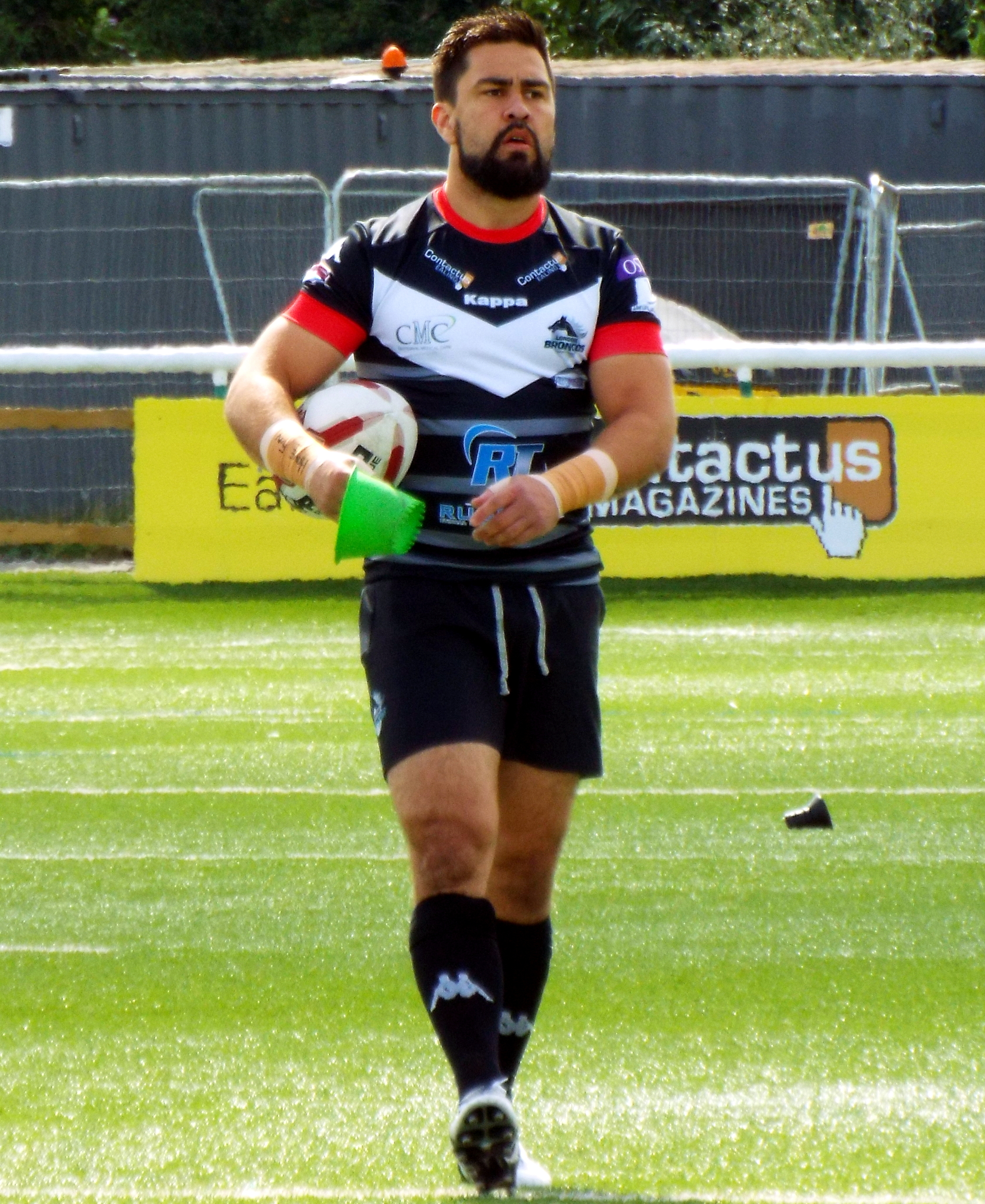

Personal information
- Born: 13 November 1984 (age 42) Canberra, Australian Capital Territory, Australia
- Height: 176 cm (5 ft 9 in)
- Weight: 90 kg (14 st 2 lb)

Playing information
- Position: Five-eighth, Halfback
Club
Years	Team	Pld	T	G	FG	P
2005–07	Sydney Roosters	22	6	1	0	26
2007–13	St. George Illawarra	141	39	401	26	984
2013	London Broncos	9	5	24	1	69
2014–16	Penrith Panthers	53	8	116	1	265
2016	London Broncos	7	3	29	1	71
	Total	232	61	571	29	1415
Representative
Years	Team	Pld	T	G	FG	P
2008	Aboriginal	1	1	5	0	14
2009–11	NSW Country	2	0	1	0	2
2010–15	Indigenous Allstars	3	1	0	0	4
2011	New South Wales	3	0	9	0	18

Coaching information
Club
Years	Team	Gms	W	D	L	W%
2021–24	St. George Illawarra Dragons Women	31	13		18	42
Representative
Years	Team	Gms	W	D	L	W%
2023–26	Samoa Women	5	4	0	1	80
- Source: As of 22 November 2026

Jamie Soward (born 13 November 1984) is an Australian former professional rugby league footballer, and the former head-coach of St. George Illawarra Dragons Women in the NRLW.

A New South Wales State of Origin and Indigenous All-Stars representative five-eighth, he previously played for the Sydney Roosters, Penrith Panthers and the St. George Illawarra Dragons, with whom he won the 2010 NRL Premiership. He also spent time in England where he played in two different spells for the London Broncos, playing in the Super League and the Kingstone Press Championship.

== Early years ==
Born in Canberra, Australian Capital Territory, Soward played his junior rugby league for the Wagga Wagga Kangaroos before Soward began his career in the Canberra Raiders system. He then moved to play with the Sydney Roosters Jersey Flegg side where he helped the club win the 2004 premiership with two last-ditch field goals.

== Playing career ==
=== 2005 ===
In round 9 of the 2005 NRL season, Soward made his NRL début for the Sydney Roosters at halfback against the Newcastle Knights in the Roosters 32–2 win at the SFS. Six days before his debut, Soward's father Peter Soward had died from a heart attack. In round 17, against the Newcastle Knights at Hunter Stadium, Soward scored his first NRL career try in the Sydney Roosters 28–14 win. Soward played in 7 matches, and scored 2 tries, in his début year for the Roosters.

=== 2006 ===
Soward finished the 2006 NRL season with him playing in 14 matches, scoring four tries and kicking a goal for the Sydney Roosters.

Soward played in the 2006 NSW Cup grand final for Newtown who were the Sydney Roosters feeder club at the time against Parramatta. Newtown would lose the grand final 20-19 at Stadium Australia.

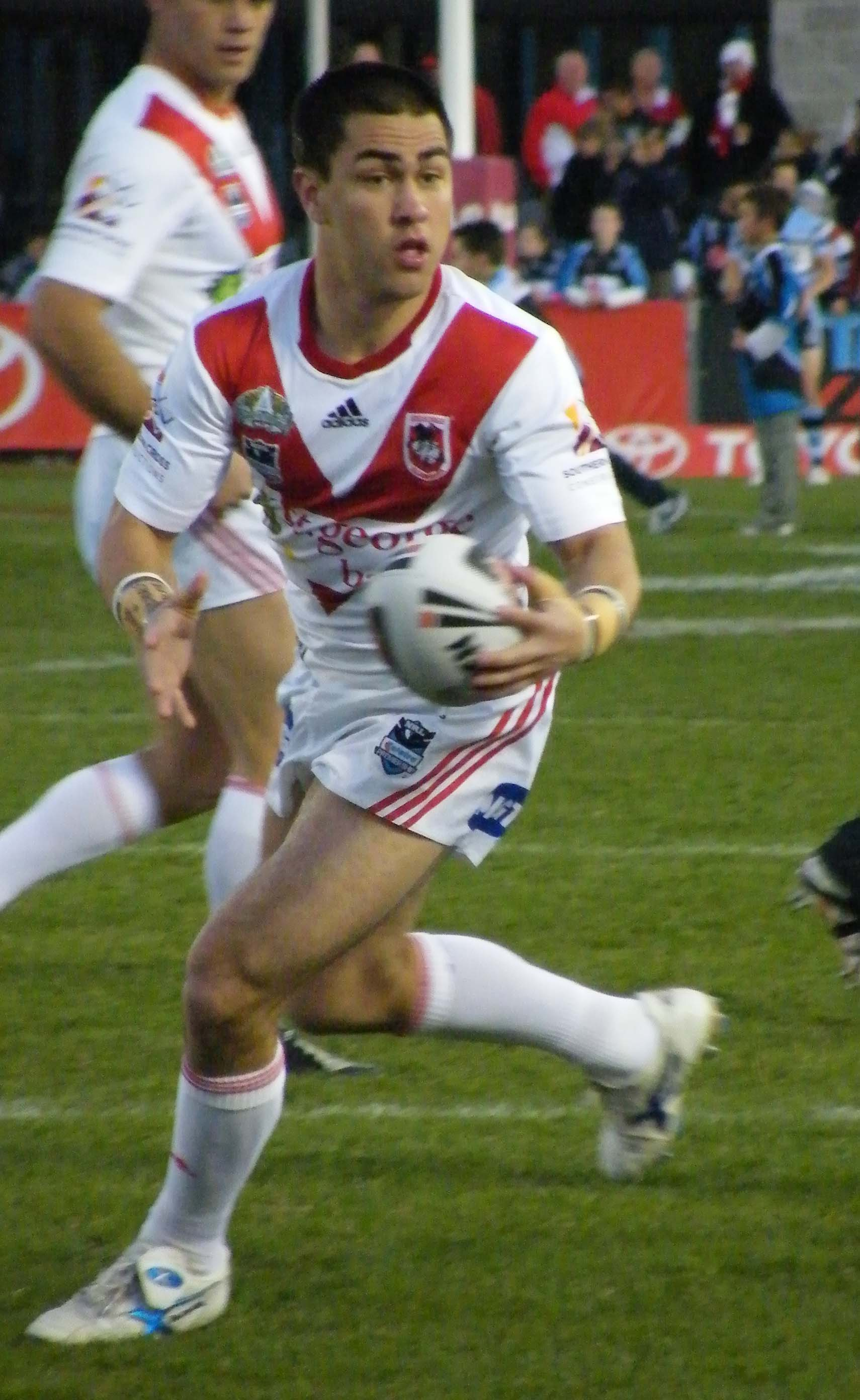
Soward playing for the Dragons in 2008

=== 2007 ===
Half-way into the 2007 season, he was given an immediate release from the Sydney Roosters to join the St. George Illawarra Dragons after being in and out of first grade and the NSWRL Premier League in his years with the Sydney Roosters. Soward played one match for the Sydney Roosters in the 2007 NRL season, in round 11 against the Cronulla-Sutherland Sharks at Remondis Stadium in the Roosters 13–12 win.

One week after he was released from the Sydney Roosters, Soward made his club début for the St. George Illawarra Dragons in round 12, playing against the Brisbane Broncos at Oki Jubilee Stadium. Soward kicked a goal and a field goal in the understrength Dragons team's 11–4 win against a full strength Brisbane team. In round 14, against the Parramatta Eels at Parramatta Stadium, Soward scored his first club try for St. George Illawarra as well kicking two goals in the 20–12 loss. In round 17, Soward set a new record for most points by an individual in a game for St. George Illawarra with 22 points from a try and nine goals, achieved when they defeated the Canberra Raiders 58–16 at WIN Stadium. Soward played in 14 matches, scored seven tries, kicked 38 goals and kicked a field goal in his first year as a St. George player, after making a successful move from the Sydney Roosters midseason.

=== 2008 ===
On 16 May 2008, Soward extended his contract with the St. George Illawarra until the end of the 2010 season.

Soward finished the 2008 NRL season with him playing in 19 matches, scoring five tries, kicking 54 goals and a field goal for the Dragons.

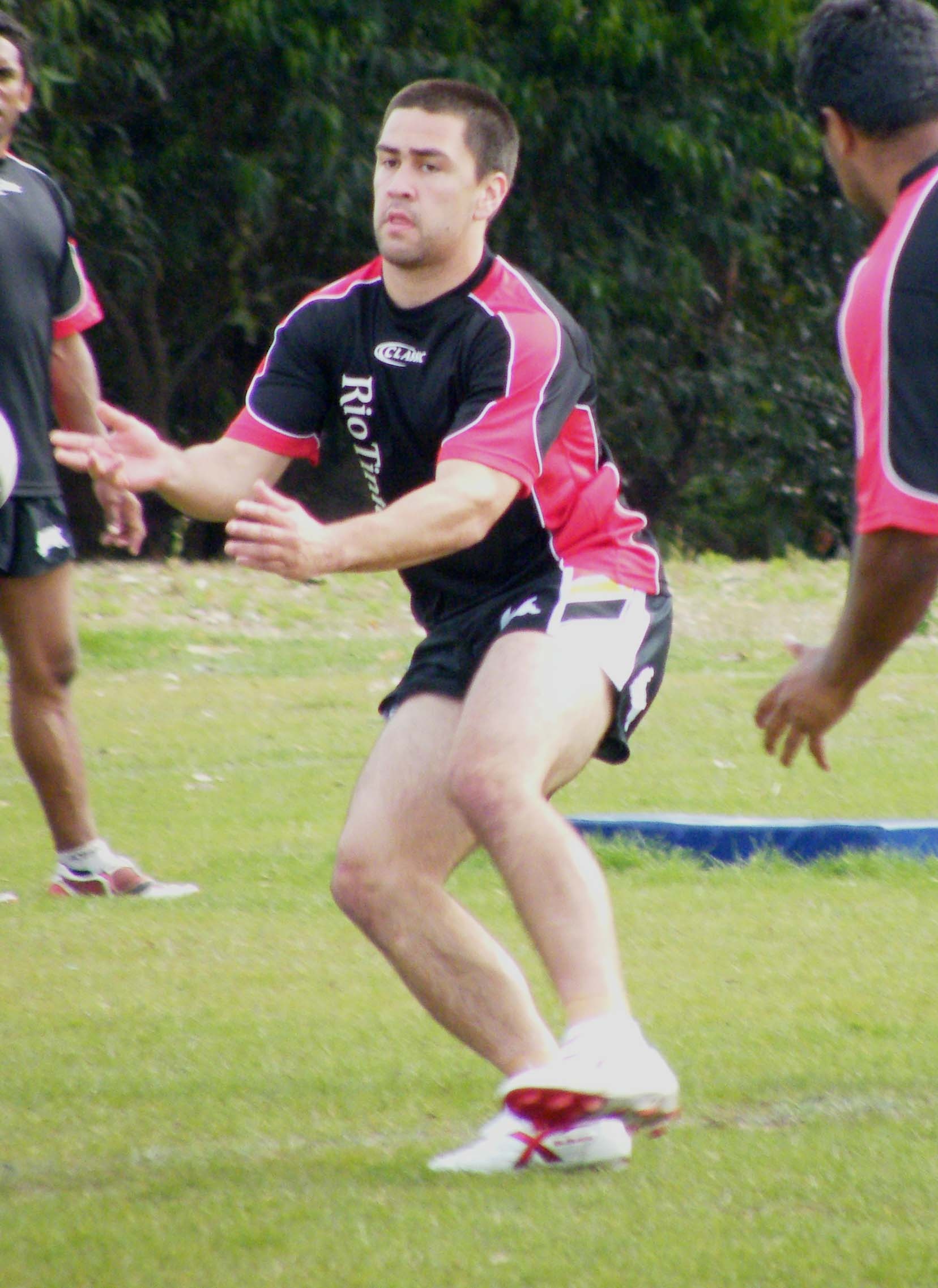
Soward warming up for the Indigenous All Stars in 2008

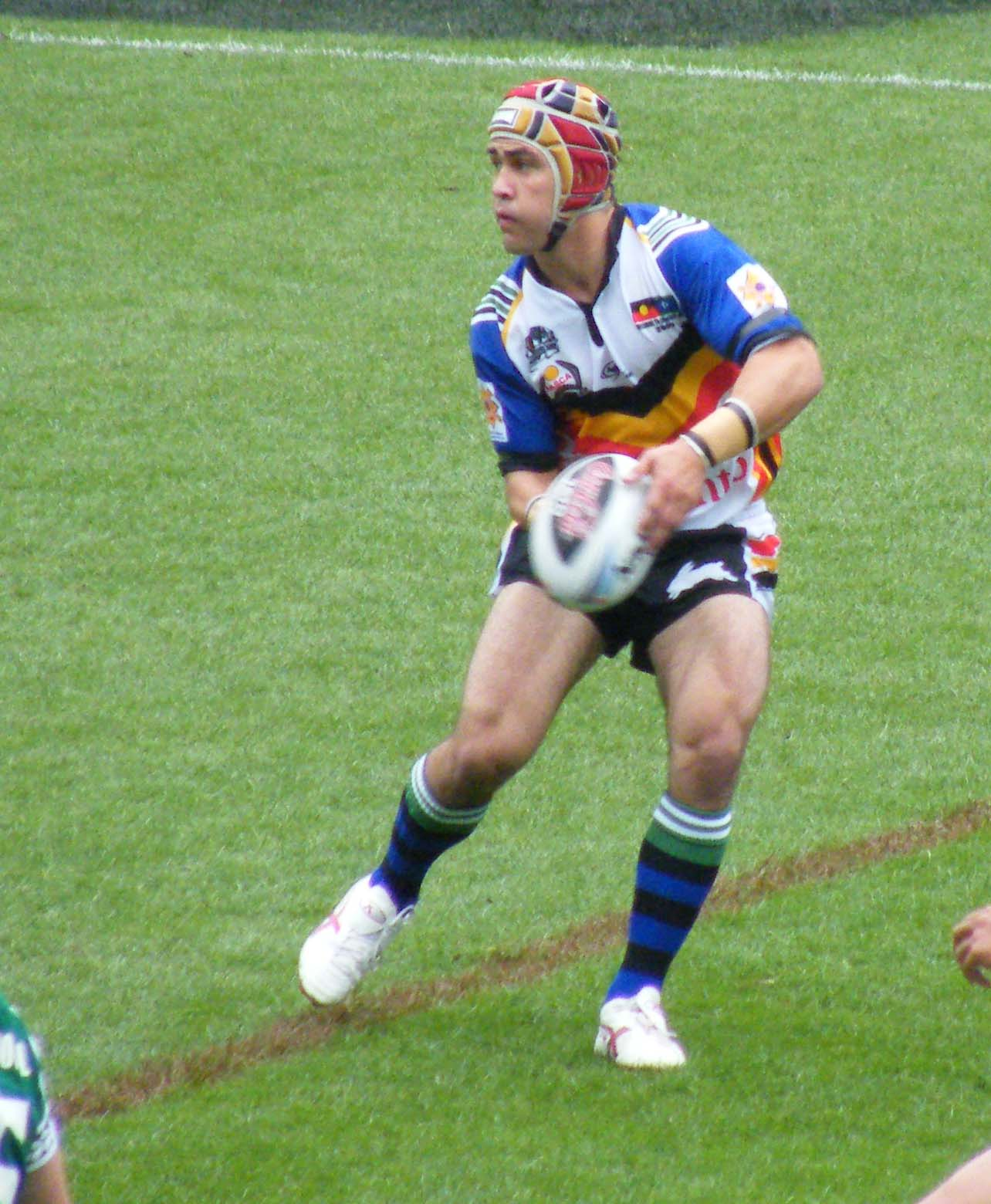
Soward playing for the Indigenous All Stars in 2008

Soward played at five-eighth in the 2008 Rugby League World Cup opener match for the Indigenous Dreamtime team against the New Zealand Māori rugby league team, Soward scored a try and kicked 5 goals in the Dreamtime sides 34–26 win at the SFS.

=== 2009 ===
In round 7, during the annual Anzac day match, St. George Illawarra defeated Soward's previous club the Sydney Roosters 29–0 in which he scored 21 points. In round 12, Soward became the first player to pass 200 points for the 2009 season when he scored 14 points against the Penrith Panthers in the club's 38–10 win at Jubilee Oval. While originally not selected, Soward played for Country in the City vs Country match on 8 May 2009, due to injury to Ben Hornby. Soward came off the interchange bench in Country's 40–18 loss to City at Wade Park in Orange. Soward finished the 2009 season with the second most Dally M votes and was named the Dally M five-eighth of the year. He had played in 26 matches, scored 12 tries, kicked 90 goals and six field goals for St. George in 2009.

=== 2010 ===
On 13 February 2010, Soward was selected for the inaugural Indigenous All Stars team against the NRL All Stars at Cbus Super Stadium. Soward played off the interchange bench and scored the winning try in the Indigenous side's 16–12 win. On 8 March 2010, Soward re-signed with the Dragons until the end of the 2013 season. In the St. George Illawarra ANZAC Day clash against the Sydney Roosters in round 7 at the SFS, Soward surpassed Mark Riddell as St. George Illawarra's all-time top point scorer with 522 points. In round 22, against the Sydney Roosters at the SCG, Soward played his 100th NRL career match in the club's 19–12 win. In the Preliminary Final, against the Wests Tigers at the SFS, Soward slotted a field goal from 35 metres out to win the game 13–12 to send St. George Illawarra to the 2010 NRL Grand Final against the Sydney Roosters. This was the St. George Illawarra Dragons first Grand Final since 1999. On 3 October 2010, Soward was a part of the St. George Illawarra Dragons first Premiership as a joint venture, with the club defeating his old club the Sydney Roosters 32–8 in the Grand Final. Soward set up the first try of the game for Mark Gasnier with a precision kick into the in-goal and his goal kicking also proved a major factor in the result as he slotted 6 from 7, including two memorable shots from the touchline into driving rain. Soward played 26 matches, scored 6 tries, kicked 84 goals and kicked five field goals in a very successful year for Soward and St. George Illawarra in the 2010 NRL season.

=== 2011 ===
On 13 January 2011, Soward was named in the "Blues in waiting" squad. A three-day camp at Homebush from 21–23 January was coordinated by coach Ricky Stuart for players who he believed had potential to feature in future New South Wales Origin teams. On 13 February 2011, Soward was chosen to play for the Indigenous All Stars from the interchange bench in the Indigenous side's 28–12 loss to the NRL All Stars team at Cbus Super Stadium. On 28 February 2011, Soward played in the 2011 World Club Challenge against 2010's Super League XV champions the Wigan Warriors, helping his side to a 21–15 victory with two goals and a field goal. Soward was selected at five-eighth for the Country team against the City team in the Country's 18–12 win at Lavington Sports Ground in Albury. On 15 May 2011, Soward was selected to represent the New South Wales Blues as a five-eighth against the Queensland Maroons in game one of the 2011 State of Origin series, at Suncorp Stadium. Although the Blues lost narrowly 16–12, Soward played an exceptional game, kicking two goals. In game two at ANZ Stadium, Soward had another exceptional kicking game, and also set up the match sealing try to win the match for the Blues 18–8, the Blues lost game three 24–34 at Suncorp Stadium. In round 20, against the Canberra Raiders at Canberra Stadium, Soward played in his 100th NRL career match for the club in their 19-24 loss. Soward played in 23 matches, scored four tries, kicked 68 goals and five field goals during the 2011 NRL season.

=== 2012 ===
Soward played in 20 matches, scored two tries, kicked 43 goals and kicked three field goals for St. George Illawarra in the 2012 NRL season. In round 26, against the Parramatta Eels at ANZ Stadium, Soward played his 150th career match in the club's 29–8 win.

=== 2013 ===
In 2013, Soward's form declined. St. George Illawarra started losing matches and he was blamed partially for it. On 17 April he signed a four-year contract with the Penrith Panthers for $1.5 million Australian Dollars. In round 13 he got dropped to NSW Cup. Two weeks later, on 17 June 2013, Soward, after being denied a release to join Penrith by the St. George club, signed with the London Broncos in the Super League for the rest of the 2013 season after a falling out with Dragons coach Steve Price. Soward played in 12 matches, scored 3 tries, kicked 21 goals and 4 field goals in his final year with a seven-year stint for St. George Illawarra in the 2013 NRL season before moving to the London Broncos.

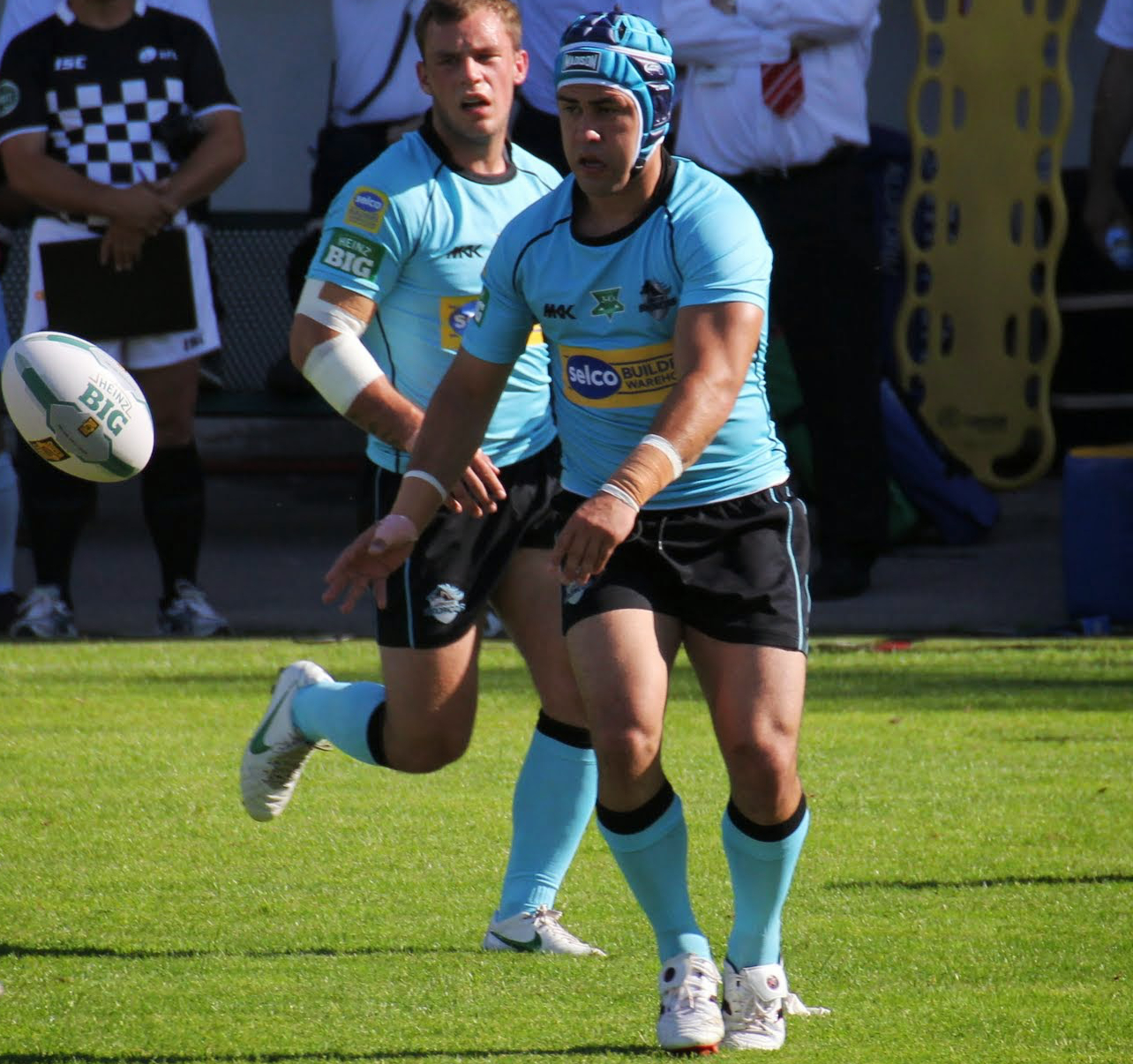
Soward playing for the London Broncos in 2013

In London, Soward scored 67 points in only nine games, as well as helping the team to the Challenge Cup semi-finals, where they lost 0–70 to Wigan. Soward had scored a try, a goal and a drop-goal in their 29–10 quarter-final win over Sheffield.

=== 2014 ===
In February 2014, Soward was selected in the Panthers inaugural 2014 Auckland Nines squad. In round 1 against the Newcastle Knights at Penrith Stadium, Soward made his club début for Penrith, kicking a goal for the club in their 30–8 win. In round 9, against the Newcastle Knights at Hunter Stadium, Soward scored his first try for the Penrith club in a 32–10 victory. In Penrith's Finals Week 1 match against the minor premiers, the Sydney Roosters at the Sydney Football Stadium, Soward kicked the game-winning field goal in the last minute of play in Penrith's 19–18 victory over the Roosters. Soward capped off a brilliant season in his first year with Panthers with him playing in 25 matches, scoring seven tries, kicking 63 goals and a field goal.

Off the field in 2014, Soward began a feud with former NRL player Beau Ryan after Ryan mocked Soward on The Footy Show. Soward was reportedly angry that Ryan had made fun of his voice and the way that he talked as the player has a lisp. Ryan came out to the media and said “It's all light-hearted stuff and I didn't mean to hurt anyone, and if I have hurt anyone I'll stop it".

=== 2015 ===
Following round 2 against the Gold Coast Titans in the Penrith club's 40-0 win at Bathurst, Soward had back surgery and missed a month and a half. When Soward returned in round 9, against the Brisbane Broncos in the club's 8-5 loss at Penrith Stadium, he was inconsistent at best and, coupled with a spate of injuries, he and the Panthers struggled throughout the season. The Penrith Panthers finished off a brutal 2015 NRL season just two points shy of a wooden spoon. Soward finished the season playing in 16 matches and kicking 22 goals. On 10 October 2015, rumours were floating around about Soward was set be released from the Penrith club but these were dismissed by Soward. In early December, Soward gave himself a 12-month ultimatum: vowing to walk away from the game if he didn't return to his best in the 2016 season.

=== 2016 ===
On 13 February 2016, Soward played for the Indigenous All Stars against the World All Stars, playing off the interchange bench in the 8-12 loss at Suncorp Stadium. In Round 10 of the 2016 NRL season, Soward scored a try and kicked five goals against the New Zealand Warriors in Penrith's 30-18 win, breaking his two-year try-scoring drought in what was one of his best solo performances in over a year. However, Soward's form later slumped and he was dropped to the NSW Cup. On 30 June 2016, Soward was released from his Penrith contract mid-way through the season and he re-joined the London Broncos. Soward was sent off for punching during London's 34-30 defeat by Leigh Centurions.

On 15 July 2016, Soward taunted former NRL player Beau Ryan on social media after Ryan had done another skit on The Footy Show making fun of Soward. In the sketch presented by Ryan on the show, Soward's face was superimposed on the black cat that ran onto Pepper Stadium. Ryan commented "Over the weekend we saw a strange new trend of coaches and ex-players trying to sneak into the grounds and not be noticed. This little scaredy cat (vision of Soward's face on cat) who tried to run away had no-one fooled…". Ryan then added in a whiny voice: "It's too cold…meow".

Soward then took to social media platform Twitter and displayed a picture of himself holding the NRL premiership trophy which he won as a player in 2010 with St George and the caption of "Show me yours and I'll show you mine, oh wait shit sorry you don't have one#".

Soward then typed a message at Ryan saying "He must miss me I'm not even in the country and still doing shit jokes. Oh well guess that's why I work with the gang @FOXSportsAUS all class".

On 7 November 2016, Soward announced his retirement, ending a 14-year professional career. Soward played in 12 matches, scored 1 try and kicked 32 goals for the Penrith Panthers in the 2016 NRL season.

== Post-playing ==
In 2017, Soward began working for Fox Sports. The following year he became a commentator for Channel 9 on their coverage of the Canterbury Cup NSW competition.

In 2019, Soward joined the 2GB Continuous Call Team program as one of the co-commentators for the Saturday night matches. Soward also joined Macquarie Sports Radio. In 2020, he launched a podcast which he hosts called Sweet and Soward with semi-regular co-host Nick Davis and ‘The Dereks’ who make guest appearances.

In 2021, he joined the St. George Illawarra coaching staff as a kicking coach. That year he was also named as the 2022 St. George Illawarra NRL Women's Premiership team head-coach. On 2 September 2024 it was announced that Soward had been let go as the coach of the NRLW squad after being told the option in his contract would not be activated.

On 20 September 2023, he was appointed as head coach of Samoa Women for the forthcoming end-of-year Pacific Championships.

In October 2025, Soward was announced as coach for the North Coast Bulldogs for their 2026 season.
