= Brett Firman =

Australian rugby league footballer

Personal information
- Full name: Brett Firman
- Born: 31 May 1982 (age 44) Temora, New South Wales, Australia

Playing information
- Position: Halfback
Club
Years	Team	Pld	T	G	FG	P
2003–04	St. George Illawarra	22	7	11	0	50
2005	Sydney Roosters	4	1	0	0	4
2005–06	North Qld Cowboys	18	3	0	0	12
2007	Penrith Panthers	2	0	0	0	0
	Total	46	11	11	0	66

Brett Firman is an Australian former professional rugby league footballer who played in the 2000s. He played in the National Rugby League, primarily in the halves, for the St. George Illawarra Dragons, Sydney Roosters, North Queensland Cowboys, Penrith Panthers, and the Helensburgh Tigers of the Illawarra Rugby League.

== Biography ==
=== Early career ===
While attending Port Macquarie St. Josephs College, Firman played for the Australian Schoolboys team in 2000.

Firman began his career with the Port Macquarie Sharks, after being discovered by the NRL's Cronulla-Sutherland Sharks and then went on to winning a Premier League Grand Final in 2002 for Cronulla before moving to the St George Illawarra Dragons.

=== 2003–2004 ===
He quickly became an NRL premiership regular for the St George Illawarra Dragons and was in the running for the 2003 Dally M Rookie of the Year award before the awards were cancelled due to industrial action from the Rugby League Players' Association. Firman continued with the Dragons in 2004, but broke his leg playing Premier League in round 3 after being dropped in favour of Mathew Head. Head impressed many observers, and it became obvious at the end of the season that the Dragons would have to choose between the two players as they could not afford both under the NRL salary cap. The Dragons chose to re-sign Head, despite Firman still having a year on his contract with the club.

=== 2005 ===
Firman moved to the Sydney Roosters for 2005, with coach Ricky Stuart hoping for him to form a combination with Brett Finch in order to replace retiring great Brad Fittler. The Roosters had a bad start to the year, and Firman was soon dropped to Premier League and was seemingly unwanted by the club. He was released mid-season to join with the Cowboys, where he partnered 2005 Dally M medal winner Johnathan Thurston in the halves. The Cowboys reached the finals for the second successive year after finishing in 5th position, and despite being beaten 50–6 by the Wests Tigers in the first week, they beat Melbourne Storm in the second week, and then the Parramatta Eels in the preliminary final, with Firman scoring an important try, putting the club in their first ever Grand Final, against the Tigers. Firman played from the interchange bench in the 2005 NRL Grand Final loss.

=== 2006–2007 ===
Firman trialled with the Penrith Panthers over the 2006 offseason after gaining an early release from the North Queensland Cowboys, he was finally awarded a full-time contract to play with the Penrith club for the 2007 NRL season after their second trial match against the Gold Coast Titans on 3 March. Firman played two games for Penrith in the 2007 NRL season. His final game for the club was in round 17 against the Wests Tigers where Penrith were defeated 43–26 at Telstra Stadium. Penrith would finish the season in last place on the table. He was later released by the Penrith club.

== 2002 NZ tour sexual assault investigation ==
While on a tour of New Zealand in February 2002, members of the Cronulla-Sutherland Sharks were involved in a group sex session of disputed consent with a young woman in a Christchurch hotel room. The New Zealand police "... noted that some comments she made suggesting she was not distressed were a mechanism for coping with what had happened." Detective Superintendent Neville Jenkins described Clare (a pseudonym) as naive, young for her age and "...just a growing up teenager."

The ABC TV Four Corners program "Code of Silence", broadcast on 11 May 2009, reported the incident, where both Matthew Johns and Brett Firman spoke with Four Corners off-camera, and stated that they were the first players to have sex with Clare; Firman saying that "she was up for it a hundred per cent".

Johns has been withdrawn from his various public facing roles despite his public apology. No other players involved, including Brett who was named, have done so to date.
