= Lachlan Russell =

Australian rugby league footballer

Personal information
- Born: 21 January 1984 (age 42)

Playing information
- Position: Halfback
Club
Years	Team	Pld	T	G	FG	P
2004	St George Illawarra	1	0	0	0	0
- Source: As of 8 January 2020

Lachlan Russell is a former professional rugby league footballer who played in the 2000s for the St. George Illawarra Dragons.

== Playing career ==
Russell made his first grade debut for St. George Illawarra in round 10 of the 2004 NRL season against Canterbury-Bankstown at WIN Stadium with the match finishing in a 38-12 loss. This was Russell's one and only game in the top grade.

In 2009, Russell played for the Dapto Canaries in the Illawarra rugby league competition.
