= Tony Jensen =

Australian rugby league footballer

Personal information
- Full name: Tony Jensen
- Born: 27 March 1980 (age 46) Toowoomba, Queensland, Australia

Playing information
- Height: 184 cm (6 ft 0 in)
- Weight: 101 kg (223 lb; 15 st 13 lb)
- Position: Second-row, Prop, Loose forward
Club
Years	Team	Pld	T	G	FG	P
2001	Northern Eagles	4	1	0	0	4
2003	Manly Sea Eagles	20	1	0	0	4
2006	St. George Illawarra	13	1	0	0	4
	Total	37	3	0	0	12

Tony Jensen (born 27 March 1980 in Australia) is a former professional rugby league footballer. He played for the Northern Eagles, Manly-Warringah Sea Eagles and the St. George Illawarra Dragons as a Second-row.

Jensen grew up in Toowoomba where he attended Harristown State High School and played for the Newtown Lions in the Toowoomba Rugby League.
