= Michael Howell (rugby league) =

Australian rugby league footballer

Personal information
- Born: 4 August 1982 (age 43); Camden, New South Wales

Playing information
- Position: Lock, Second-row
Club
Years	Team	Pld	T	G	FG	P
2002–04	St. George Illawarra	15	2	0	0	8

Michael Howell (born 4 August 1982) is a former professional rugby league footballer who played for the St. George Illawarra Dragons from 2002 to 2004 and Toulouse Olympique in 2006.
