= Ryan Powell (rugby league) =

Australian rugby league footballer

Personal information
- Born: 20 March 1982 (age 43)

Playing information
- Position: Second-row, Lock, Hooker
Club
Years	Team	Pld	T	G	FG	P
2004–05	St. George Illawarra	5	0	0	0	0
- Source: Whiticker/Hudson

Ryan Powell (born 20 March 1982) is an Australian former professional rugby league footballer who played for the St. George Illawarra Dragons.
