= Lincoln Withers =

Australian rugby league footballer

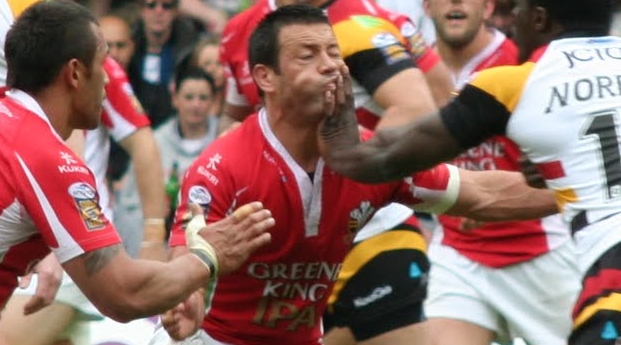

Personal information
- Full name: Lincoln Withers
- Born: 7 May 1981 (age 45) Canberra, Australian Capital Territory, Australia

Playing information
- Height: 176 cm (5 ft 9 in)
- Weight: 84 kg (13 st 3 lb)
- Position: Hooker, Halfback, Five-eighth
Club
Years	Team	Pld	T	G	FG	P
2000	Canberra Raiders	4	0	0	0	0
2001–03	Wests Tigers	46	13	0	0	52
2004	St. George Illawarra	25	5	0	0	20
2005–08	Canberra Raiders	79	22	0	0	88
2009–11	Crusaders RL	71	10	0	0	40
2012–13	Hull Kingston Rovers	42	10	0	0	40
	Total	267	60	0	0	240
Representative
Years	Team	Pld	T	G	FG	P
2012	Exiles	1	0	0	0	0

Lincoln Withers (born 7 May 1981) is an Australian former professional rugby league footballer who last played for Hull Kingston Rovers in the Super League.

Withers also played for Crusaders and in the NRL for the Canberra Raiders, St George Illawarra Dragons and the Wests Tigers. His position of choice was either at half-back or hooker.

== Background ==
Withers was born in Canberra, Australian Capital Territory. Lincoln Withers junior rugby league club was Woden Western Rams.

== Playing career ==
While attending Erindale College in the ACT, Withers was selected to play with the Australian Schoolboys rugby league team in 1997.

On 8 May 2000, Withers made his first grade debut for the Canberra Raiders in Round 14 against Brisbane Broncos at Canberra Stadium.

In 2001, Withers joined Wests and played with them up until the end of 2003. In 2004, Withers joined St George Illawarra spending one season at the club before returning to Canberra becoming a regular starter with the team before departing at the end of 2008.

Withers signed with the Super League side Crusaders for 2009 after being released from the final year of his contract at Canberra.

In September 2011, Withers joined Hull Kingston Rovers in the Super League on a two-year deal. In September 2013, Withers announced that he would return to Australia at the end of the 2013 season. Withers was last playing for the Woden Valley Rams in the Canberra Rugby League Competition.
