= Reece Simmonds =

Australian rugby league footballer

Personal information
- Full name: Reece Simmonds
- Born: 7 January 1980 (age 46) Sydney, New South Wales, Australia

Playing information
- Height: 5 ft 9 in (1.75 m)
- Weight: 12 st 7 lb (79 kg)
- Position: Wing
Club
Years	Team	Pld	T	G	FG	P
2002–06	St. George Illawarra	48	21	0	0	84
2007	South Sydney	7	1	2	0	8
2011	St. George Illawarra	2	2	0	0	8
	Total	57	24	2	0	100
Representative
Years	Team	Pld	T	G	FG	P
2003	NSW Residents	1	1	0	0	4

Reece Simmonds (born 7 January 1980) is an Australian former professional rugby league footballer who played in the 2000s and 2010s. He was born in Sydney, and played in the National Rugby League (NRL) for the St George Illawarra Dragons (2002–2006; 2011) and the South Sydney Rabbitohs (2007).

== Playing career ==
An Eagle Vale St Andrews junior, Simmonds worked as a greyhound handler before he made his debut with St George Illawarra in the opening round of the 2002 season. He played 14 games at fullback in 2002 and 2003.

2004 was Simmonds best year. Switching to the wing he made 23 appearances and scored 14 tries. However, the next two seasons with the Dragons were less successful.

In 2007, Simmonds joined the South Sydney Rabbitohs in the National Rugby League competition, but played in just 7 games that season. At the end of the 2007 season, Simmonds played for South Sydney's feeder club side, the North Sydney Bears in their NSW Cup grand final against Parramatta at Stadium Australia. Simmonds scored a try with 15 minutes left before Joe Williams kicked a field goal with 3 minutes remaining to make the score 15–14. Norths then lost the grand final in the last 20 seconds of the game after Parramatta player Weller Hauraki crossed over for the match winning try.

From 2008 to 2010, Simmonds worked as a coal-miner and played in the lower-tier based rugby league competitions, with Collegians in Wollongong and Wests Illawarra. He retired in 2010 after breaking his leg for a second time, but was persuaded to return to playing, winning a local premiership for Wests. He was also captain of Illawarra Division in the NSW CRL Championships.

In 2011, Simmonds was called into the Dragons' NRL team to help compensate for nine players out due to injuries and origin commitments. He returned to retirement at the end of the season to coach the Wests Red Devils in the Illawarra League.
