= Matt Cooper (rugby league) =

Australia international rugby league footballer

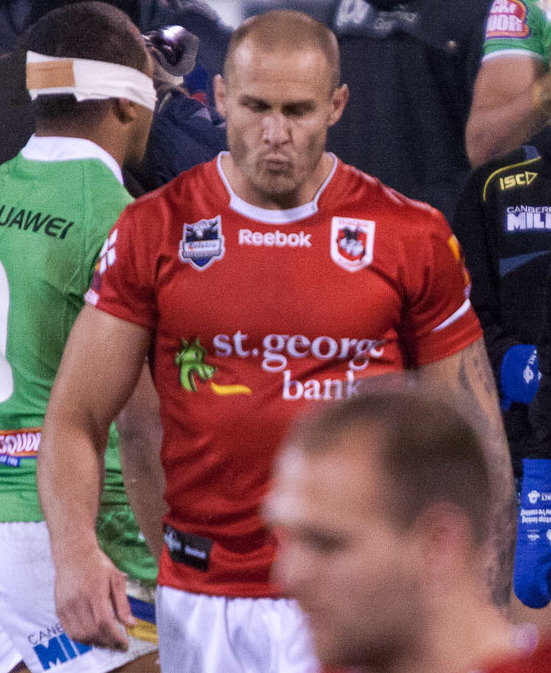

Personal information
- Full name: Matthew Cooper
- Born: 18 April 1979 (age 47) Port Kembla, New South Wales, Australia

Playing information
- Height: 186 cm (6 ft 1 in)
- Weight: 98 kg (15 st 6 lb)
- Position: Centre, Wing
Club
Years	Team	Pld	T	G	FG	P
2000–13	St George Illawarra	244	125	0	0	500
Representative
Years	Team	Pld	T	G	FG	P
2003–04	Country NSW	2	1	0	0	4
2004–10	New South Wales	13	3	0	0	12
2004–06	Australia	7	8	0	0	32
2010	NRL All Stars	1	0	0	0	0

Matt Cooper (born 18 April 1979) is an Australian former professional rugby league footballer who played in the 2000s and 2010s. A New South Wales State of Origin and Australia international representative centre, he played his entire National Rugby League career for the St. George Illawarra Dragons, with whom he won the 2010 NRL grand final.

== Background ==
Cooper was born in Port Kembla, New South Wales on 18 April 1979. He originally gained an interest in rugby league football as a supporter of Sydney's Western Suburbs Magpies, the club his father followed. He began playing football at the age of six for his local junior club, the Shellharbour Sharks, while also participating in athletics and surf lifesaving. After moving to Illawarra, Cooper began supporting the Illawarra Steelers. He signed on to the Illawarra Steelers club as a teenager prior to their joint-venture with the St. George at the end of 1998. After the joint-venture of the Dragons and the Steelers clubs prior to the 1999 NRL season, Cooper was signed on with the newly formed St. George Illawarra Dragons team.

== Professional playing career ==
=== 2000s ===
At the age of twenty-one Cooper made his NRL début for the St. George Illawarra Dragons in the opening round of the 2000 season against local rivals the Cronulla-Sutherland Sharks. After making his début Cooper was replaced in the St. George Illawarra line-up for the second game of the season and was not re-called until round seven in which he crossed the line for his first try against the New Zealand Warriors, Cooper in total scored two tries in limited appearances in the 2000 season.

The 2001 season was not a successful one for Cooper, with minor injuries causing him to miss many games. He returned just before the finals, scoring two tries in the semi-final victory over Canterbury-Bankstown. In 2002, Cooper was able to retain his position in the team for the majority of the season and finished the year with a total of seven tries from nineteen games.

Cooper held down his spot for the duration of the 2003 season. In total, Cooper scored eleven tries including three doubles during the regular season, he then tasted his first representative honour being selected to play for Country in the annual City and Country Origin. Although the season eventually finished on a low note both for the Dragons and Cooper with another injury yet again forcing him out of the team. Though all was not lost for Matt as he was nominated for the Dragons player of the year, eventually losing out to Ben Hornby while he picked up the Geoff Selby Memorial NRL Coaches Award.

The 2004 season yet again was one of improvement and new opportunity, Cooper began the season well scoring a total of eight tries in six matches for St. George Illawarra including four tries in a single match against the reigning premiers the Penrith Panthers. Later Cooper was called up for the third and deciding game of the 2004 State of Origin series for New South Wales after the team had lost the second match, replacing Luke Lewis to partner his clubmate Mark Gasnier in the centres. At the conclusion of the 2004 St. George Illawarra Dragons season Gasnier had scored the most tries, with a total of seventeen, and the international selectors assigned him a spot in the Australian team for the 2004 Kangaroo tour of Great Britain, France and the United States. His club coach Nathan Brown had recommended that Cooper be selected for the Australian rugby league team under coach Wayne Bennett, though he eventually opted for the usual more experienced international representatives and Cooper did not play a competitive match on the tour.

After having an impressive début match in the previous series, Cooper was subsequently re-selected for New South Wales in the 2005 State of Origin series, playing in all three matches of the series helping New South Wales to another series win, scoring one try along the way in game two. He finished the NRL season well with thirteen tries from twenty games and was again selected to go on to tour of Great Britain with Australia. He appeared in the first three test matches on the tour, scoring five tries.

Injury yet again hit Cooper early on in the 2006 NRL season in the form of a damaged hamstring while playing in the season opening fixture against the Wests Tigers. Cooper was forced to miss several fixtures for St. George Illawarra after failing to recover from a hamstring injury sustained during the round one NRL fixture. However Cooper was once again selected to play for Australia in the mid-season test match on 5 May 2006, he scored once during a dominating 50 to 12 win over New Zealand. This was the last time Cooper has represented Australia. His hamstring injury forced Cooper to withdraw from the starting line-up for the 2006 State of Origin series, being replaced by winger Eric Grothe, Jr. from the Parramatta Eels. After missing the first game of Origin for New South Wales, Cooper failed to be called up for game two with Grothe retaining his position after a solid performance in game one. On 11 June it was announced that Cooper had been called up as 18th man on stand by for the game.

In August 2008, Cooper was named in the preliminary 46-man Kangaroos squad for the 2008 Rugby League World Cup.

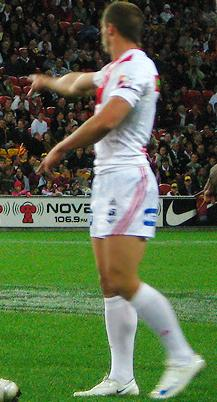
Cooper playing for the Dragons in 2008

He was selected for Country in the City vs Country match on 8 May 2009. However, he did not play in the match after withdrawing with injury.

=== 2010s ===
In the first round of the 2010 finals, St. George Illawarra defeated the Manly-Warringah Sea Eagles 28–0, with Cooper scoring two tries, surpassing Nathan Blacklock's record of 100 tries to become the Dragons highest try scorer, with 102 tries. In 2010 he got a recall to the Origin team. He played Games 1 and 2 but sustained an injury which kept him out of Game 3. On 3 October 2010, Cooper was a part of the St. George Illawarra team that beat the Sydney Roosters 32–8 in the 2010 NRL Grand Final, helping the joint venture club claim its first premiership. This was also Cooper's 100th career win out of a possible 199 NRL games.

The following February Cooper travelled with the St. George Illawarra to England to play the Super League champions, Wigan Warriors in the 2011 World Club Challenge. He scored a try in St. George Illawarra's victory. Cooper ended the 2011 season as St. George Illawarra's leading tryscorer with 14. Cooper scored six tries in 15 games in the 2012 NRL season. He scored two tries in eight games in the 2013 NRL season.

== After football ==
Cooper was a participant in the fourteenth season of Dancing with the Stars. In 2015, Cooper was a contestant in the fourth season of The Celebrity Apprentice Australia.

In late 2016, he admitted to an addiction to the drug endone, following pain relief required for a bulging disc in his vertebrae. In August 2021, Cooper was announced as a contestant on the celebrity version of Big Brother Australia.

In October 2022, Cooper launched an attack on his former club St. George Illawarra saying “There’s no pride in the jersey anymore, From 2001-2011 we only missed the finals twice. Since then, we’ve only made them twice. Obviously it changed when Wayne Bennett left. It all starts from the top… that’s where the culture comes from. There’s no pride in the jersey now, no team-first attitude. You can see that when players are asking to be released – and I’m not blaming them. There’s a reason they want to go elsewhere".

== Footnotes ==
1. "Dragons players since 1921, Player profiles", Showroom, retrieved 13 June 2006
2. "World of Rugby League Matt Cooper News & Statistics", World of Rugby League, retrieved 13 June 2006
3. "Blues call up Cooper". Foxsports.
4. Walter, Brad (19 April 2004). "Cooper's crossings drive Dragons". Sydney Morning Herald.
