= Shaun Timmins =

Australia international rugby league footballer (born 1976)

Personal information
- Born: 6 August 1976 (age 50) Kiama, New South Wales, Australia

Playing information
- Height: 184 cm (6 ft 0 in)
- Weight: 103 kg (16 st 3 lb)
- Position: Centre, Second-row, Lock, Five-eighth
Club
Years	Team	Pld	T	G	FG	P
1994–98	Illawarra Steelers	86	28	11	1	135
1999–06	St. George Illawarra	124	27	0	0	108
	Total	210	55	11	1	243
Representative
Years	Team	Pld	T	G	FG	P
1999–04	Australia	9	2	0	0	8
2000–04	New South Wales	9	3	0	1	13
2003	NSW Country	1	0	0	0	0

Shaun Timmins (born 6 August 1976) is an Australian former professional rugby league footballer who played in the 1990s and 2000s. A New South Wales State of Origin and Australian international representative utility, he played his club football in the National Rugby League for the Illawarra Steelers and the St George Illawarra Dragons. Timmins was a versatile player, performing at five-eighth, centre, lock, and second-row at representative and club levels.

== Playing career ==
Timmins was born in Kiama, New South Wales, where he played junior football and made his first appearance as a seventeen-year-old for the Steelers in round 18 of 1994 against the Cronulla-Sutherland Sharks. He was later named the Steelers' Rookie of the year. Timmins played 86 games for the Illawarra Steelers and was a foundation player in the joint venture St. George Illawarra Dragons in 1999. He played at centre in the 1999 NRL Grand Final loss to the Melbourne Storm. Timmins was first selected for the Australian team to compete in the end of season 1999 Rugby League Tri-Nations tournament. In the final against New Zealand he played from the interchange bench in the Kangaroos' 22–20 victory.

Timmins was selected for the New South Wales team in 2000. He played nine State of Origin games for the New South Wales Blues from 2000 to 2004 and eight Tests for Australia from 1999 to 2004. In 2000, Timmins suffered an injury which revealed a chronic knee condition. His representative ascendancy came to a halt when he was sidelined for 18 months including the whole 2001 NRL season. He returned to the field in 2002 and showed tremendous ability to again represent NSW and Australia in a Test match against Great Britain. He was named St. George Illawarra's best player in 2002.

In 2003 after just one club game in the five eighth role, Timmins was selected for Country and then for NSW at five eighth. A 2003 recurrence (in the other knee) of his condition prevented his national selection for the Kangaroo Tour that year and threatened the end of his career. Following five knee operations in total, Timmins made a remarkable recovery in the 2003–2004 off-season. His return to form led to selection for Australia in the 2004 ANZAC Test against New Zealand. He also played for New South Wales that year and entered State of Origin folklore in Game I of the 2004 series by kicking the winning field goal in extra time. It was only the second field goal of his career. Following the 2004 Kangaroo tour of Great Britain, France and the US, Timmins announced his retirement from representative football, expressing a focused intention to win a premiership with St. George Illawarra.

Timmins's last game with St. George Illawarra was the loss in the 2006 Grand Final qualifier against Melbourne. Timmins had played 124 games for St. George Illawarra before retiring from the NRL at the end of 2006. Timmins's contract discussions with the Castleford Tigers for the 2007 season in the UK ended following that club's relegation to second division and after speculative talks with the Gold Coast Titans he was forced into retirement due to the condition of his knees. In March, 2007, Timmins once again felt he was ready to compete in the NRL and offered his services to the Dragons following a pectoral muscle injury to Mark Gasnier. The offer was not accepted.

== Sources ==
- Alan Whiticker & Glen Hudson (2007). The Encyclopedia of Rugby League Players. Wetherill Park, New South Wales: Gary Allen Pty Ltd. pp. 550–551. ISBN 978-1-877082-93-1.
