= Mathew Head =

Australian rugby league footballer

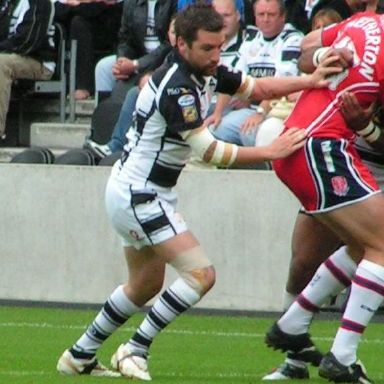

Personal information
- Full name: Mathew Head
- Born: 9 May 1982 (age 44) Wagga Wagga, New South Wales, Australia

Playing information
- Height: 175 cm (5 ft 9 in)
- Weight: 78 kg (12 st 4 lb)
- Position: Halfback
Club
Years	Team	Pld	T	G	FG	P
2003–07	St. George Illawarra	57	8	95	1	219
2007	Hull F.C.	10	1	0	1	5
2008	Wests Tigers	11	1	0	0	4
2009	St. George Illawarra	10	0	0	0	0
	Total	88	10	95	2	228

Coaching information
Club
Years	Team	Gms	W	D	L	W%
2021	St. George Illawarra Dragons Women
Representative
Years	Team	Gms	W	D	L	W%
2016–19	New South Wales Women	3	0	1	2	0

Mathew Head (born 9 May 1982) is an Australian professional rugby league coach who is the head coach of the Wynnum Manly Seagulls in the Queensland Cup and a former professional rugby league footballer who played in the 2000s and 2010s as a halfback for the St. George Illawarra Dragons, Wests Tigers and Hull F.C..

== Background ==
Head was born in Wagga Wagga, New South Wales, Australia.

== Playing career ==
=== St. George Illawarra Dragons ===
Head began his professional rugby league career in 2003, making his first grade debut in round 3 on 29 March 2003. He was the 2004 St. George Illawarra Dragons season's top point-scorer.

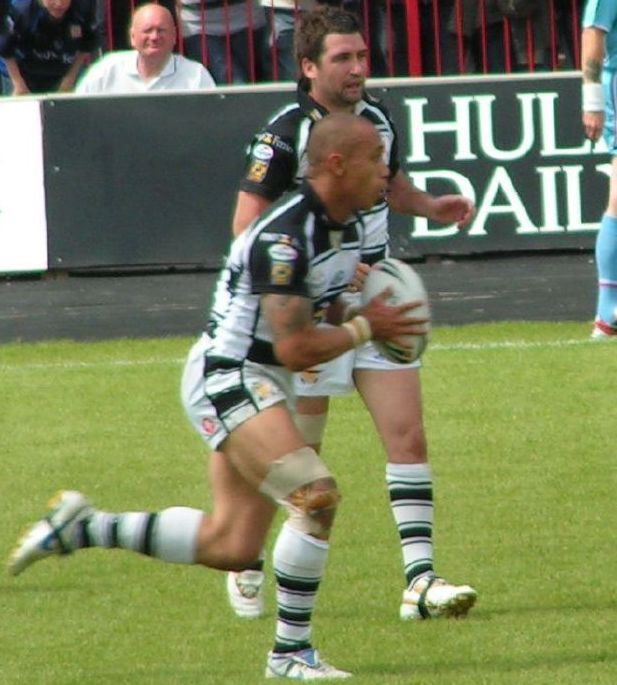
Motu Tony with the ball and Mathew Head in action for Hull

=== Hull FC ===
In 2007, Head signed for Hull F.C. until the end of that season in a bid to help the club reach the Super League play-offs in which they were defeated in the 2nd week of the play-offs by Wigan Warriors.

=== Wests Tigers ===
In November 2007, after announcing his desire to return to Australia, Head was signed by the Wests Tigers on a one-year contract. Fitness levels and injuries again limited his time on field during the 2008 season.

=== Return to the St. George Illawarra Dragons ===
In August 2008, Head agreed to a return to the Dragons in 2009. Since being signed by St George Illawarra, Head played 11 games for St George Illawarra's feeder club, the Shellharbour Dragons, and 10 matches off the bench in the position of halfback or five-eighth for the NRL side - winning 8 and losing 2.

=== 2010 ===
Head retired from the NRL in season 2010 on his own accord and went back to the Dapto Canaries as the teams Captain / coach.

== Coaching career ==
Head was the Balmain Tigers SG Ball head coach between 2013 and 2015, winning the SG Ball in 2013 and the under 20's coach for the St George Illawarra Dragons club in 2016. In 2017, he was the Illawarra RLFC coach in the NSW Cup. In 2019, Head was coach of the St. George Illawarra Dragons Canterbury Cup team that won the minor premiership. In 2021, Head was appointed head coach of the St. George Illawarra Dragons Women NRLW team in the upcoming 4 week season. In 2022, Head replaced Matthew Elliott as assistant coach of the men's team. In 2023, Head was appointed head coach of the Wynnum Manly Seagulls. In March 2025, Head signed a 3 year extension that will take him through to the end of the 2028 season.

Year	Team	Wins	Draw	Losses
2013	Balmain Tigers SG Ball	11	0	3
2014	Balmain Tigers SG Ball	8	0	3
2015	Balmain Tigers SG Ball	8	0	3
2016	St George Illawarra Dragons NYC	16	1	9
2017	St George Illawarra Dragons ISP Cup	8	1	9
2018	St George Illawarra Dragons ISP Cup	14	0	8
2019	St George Illawarra Dragons CC Cup	13	3	6
