= Mark Riddell =

Australian rugby league player

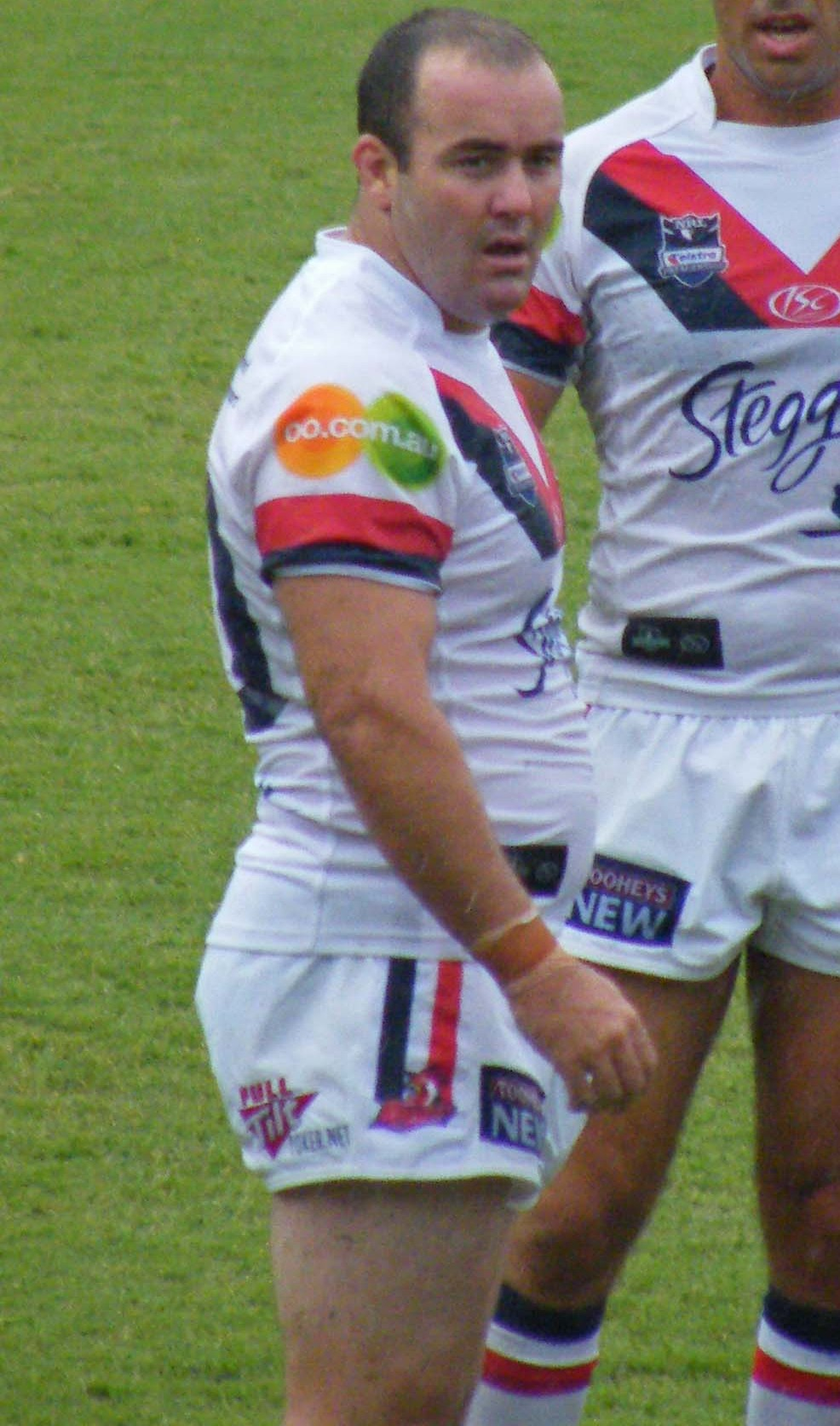

Personal information
- Full name: Mark Robert Riddell
- Born: 9 December 1980 (age 45) Sydney, New South Wales, Australia

Playing information
- Height: 182 cm (6 ft 0 in)
- Weight: 109 kg (17 st 2 lb)
- Position: Hooker Second-row
Club
Years	Team	Pld	T	G	FG	P
2001–04	St George Illawarra	92	30	198	1	517
2005–08	Parramatta Eels	86	14	28	0	112
2009–10	Wigan Warriors	62	5	9	0	38
2011	Sydney Roosters	11	0	0	0	0
	Total	251	49	235	1	667
Representative
Years	Team	Pld	T	G	FG	P
2004–05	NSW City	2	1	0	0	4

Coaching information
Representative
Years	Team	Gms	W	D	L	W%
2012	New South Wales	1	0	0	1	0
2012	Australia Women

Mark Robert Riddell (born 9 December 1980) is an Australian rugby league commentator and former professional player who played as a hooker in the 2000s and 2010s. A City New South Wales representative goal-kicker, he played in the National Rugby League for the St. George Illawarra Dragons, Parramatta Eels and the Sydney Roosters, and in the Super League with the Wigan Warriors.

== St George Illawarra Dragons ==
Riddell eventually made the transition into first grade while playing with his new club side at St George, making his début against local rivals the Cronulla-Sutherland Sharks during round one of the 2001 season. During the season he became a regular goal-kicker for the club where he developed a distinctive 'raised arm' motion before he would take the kick. Fans in the crowd would mimic this action. Riddell had an impressive début season in first grade with St. George Illawarra finishing the season as the club's top scorer with 130 points and cemented his position in the side as hooker.

During his second season with St. George Illawarra, Riddell would again have a good season not only impressing club staff and fans with his quickly evolving running game from dummy half, goal kicking and strength close to the try line ultimately earning himself a call up to the 2002 international Australian Kangaroos 'train-on' squad but was not selected in the final touring side. He finished the season again as the club's top scorer with 129 points to his name even though he was sidelined during several games in the season through suspension after being sent off twice during the regular season.

At the start of the 2003 NRL season, Riddell was criticised amongst some media circles for being slow, out of shape and overweight along with negative talk about discipline problems, however nothing eventuated and he went on to play all twenty-four games of the regular season again finishing as the club's top point scorer with an individual record high of 166 points. In the final round, the injury-ravaged St. George club upset the finals-bound Brisbane Broncos 26–25 with Riddell scoring 18 points of his own, including a last-minute pressure penalty goal 41 metres out from the try line and 10 metres in from touch. This was the two points that won the Dragons the game after having fallen behind through a Darren Lockyer field goal five minutes beforehand.

2004 was again another season of consistent performances for Riddell and several media pundits began speculating on his chances of representing New South Wales in the annual State of Origin, however he was left out of the side but still tasted his first representative experience playing for the City origin side in the annual City vs Country Origin fixture. Salary cap restraints on the club at the conclusion of the season along with several lucrative offers eventuated in a move from the Dragons. Riddell signed with the Parramatta Eels for the 2005 NRL season.

He left St. George Illawarra as the club's highest ever point scorer.

== Parramatta Eels ==
Riddell began the 2005 NRL season with the Parramatta Eels in his regular role of hooker. He had his worst season in regards to point scoring after having to share the goal kicking duties with teammate Luke Burt, finishing the season with only 50 points but ultimately helping his side to the Minor Premiership.

Riddell was in the Parramatta side which made it to the preliminary final as favorites against North Queensland Cowboys. In a game that they were expected to win, Parramatta were beaten 29–0 in one of the biggest upsets of the season. In 2017, Riddell spoke of the disappointment to miss out on qualifying for the grand final in 2005 by saying "The worst thing was that we had watched St George lose to Wests Tigers the night before and we had comfortably beat Wests twice that year and thought we were morals for the premiership".

On 17 May 2006, Riddell was dropped from the Parramatta first grade side and fined a total of $5,000 for failing to show up to a recovery session on a Monday morning following a regular season fixture, he later admitted the reason he had failed to show up to the session was because he was intoxicated. His axing, along with that of Tim Smith's, was the first piece of action taken by Jason Taylor who just moments earlier was appointed caretaker coach following long-serving coach Brian Smith's dismissal.

In the 2007 NRL season, Riddell made 23 appearances for Parramatta as the club made the preliminary final but fell short of a grand final appearance losing to Melbourne 26–10.

Riddell stayed with at Parramatta through the 2008 NRL season, playing a total of 86 games for Parramatta.

== Wigan Warriors ==
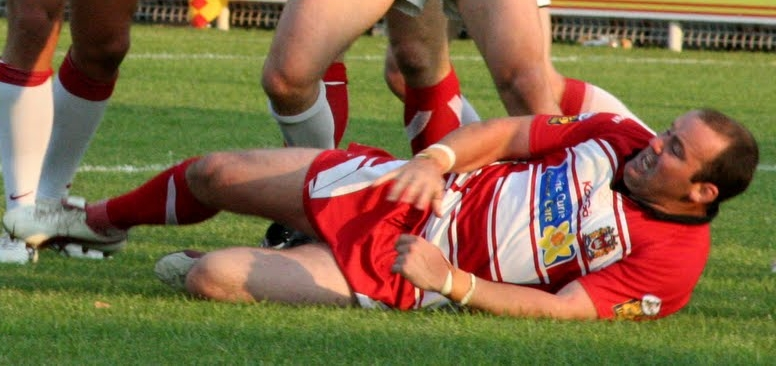
Riddell playing for the Wigan Warriors in 2010

Riddell signed a three-year deal with the Wigan Warriors starting from 2009.

Riddell played for Wigan for two years of his three-year contract. In 2010, Riddell was part of the Warriors side that won the League Leaders' Shield.

He played in the 2010 Super League Grand Final victory over St. Helens at Old Trafford, adding his name to the Grand Final score sheet by successfully kicking a penalty goal.

After the 2010 season, Riddell was released from the last year of his contract so that he could return to Australia to tend to his ill mother.

== Sydney Roosters ==
After his release from Wigan in 2010, Riddell made his return to NRL for the 2011 season, this time with the Sydney Roosters, the club he had represented at a junior level in the SG Ball and Presidents Cup competitions. Riddell was poised to sign with the Wests Tigers, however Tigers coach Tim Sheens made it clear that Riddell was unlikely to get much game time with the first grade side, barring injury, rep duties or suspension of star hooker Robbie Farah. Linking to the Roosters ensured Riddell would reunite with Brian Smith, whom he played under at the Eels for one and a half seasons.

Also in 2011, Riddell was recruited by the Sydney Morning Herald to write a weekly column. It was published for that year only.

Riddell announced his retirement in June 2011.

== Post-playing career ==
In 2012, Riddell was simultaneously coach of the Australian women's team and the Sydney Roosters SG Ball Cup side. He was also playing for The Oaks in the Group 6 country competition.

Riddell is currently a commentator for Sydney radio station 2GB as well as co-hosting Macquarie Sports Radio breakfast show with fellow 2GB commentator Mark Levy.

Riddell is married to Carly and has 3 children.
