= Mark Gasnier =

Australia international rugby league footballer

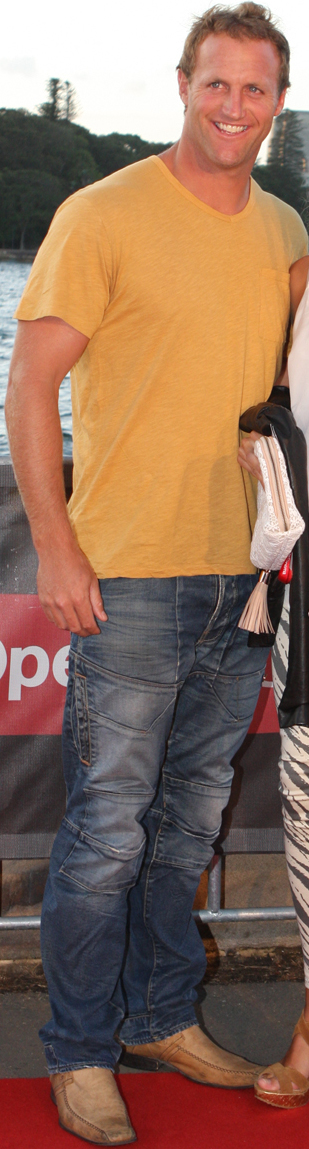

Personal information
- Full name: Mark Gasnier
- Born: 19 July 1981 (age 45) Sydney, New South Wales, Australia

Playing information
- Height: 193 cm (6 ft 4 in)
- Weight: 100 kg (15 st 10 lb)

Rugby league
- Position: Centre, Five-eighth
Club
Years	Team	Pld	T	G	FG	P
2000–08	St. George Illawarra	141	81	26	0	376
2010–11	St. George Illawarra	34	11	0	0	44
	Total	175	92	26	0	420
Representative
Years	Team	Pld	T	G	FG	P
2001–03	NSW City	2	1	0	0	4
2004–11	New South Wales	12	4	1	0	18
2001–08	Australia	15	11	0	0	44
2007	Prime Minister's XIII	1	0	0	0	0

Rugby union
- Position: Centre, Wing
Club
Years	Team	Pld	T	G	FG	P
2008–10	Stade Français	26	10	1	0	52
- Education: Peakhurst High School
- Relatives: Reg Gasnier (uncle); Dennis Tutty (cousin); Ian Tutty (cousin)

Mark Gasnier (born 19 July 1981) is an Australian former professional rugby league footballer who played in the 2000s and 2010s. A rugby league New South Wales State of Origin and international representative centre, he played eleven seasons in the National Rugby League with the St. George Illawarra Dragons, punctuated by two seasons of rugby union played with the French club Stade Français. Gasnier was a member of the Dragons' NRL premiership-winning team in 2010. He retired at the end of the 2011 season. He is the nephew of the 1960s St. George star Reg Gasnier.

== Background ==
Gasnier attended Peakhurst High School.

== Professional playing career ==
Gasnier played his junior rugby league in the St George District with the Mortdale and Penshurst based Renown United club. He toured New Zealand with the Australian Schoolboys team in 1998 and played for them again in 1999.

Gasnier made his first Grade début for the St. George Illawarra Dragons in round 8 of the 2000 season against the Newcastle Knights. He made his first grade début having just played for the Dragons in the preceding NSWRL Premier League game. He made his international début in a 2001 test against the PNG Kumuls, and scored a try on début.

In 2004, Gasnier was selected to make his State of Origin debut in Game 1 for New South Wales. Whilst in origin camp on a drunken bonding session with teammates, Gasnier left a lewd voice message on a woman’s phone. It said “[Woman's name], where the f--k are you? There's four toey humans in the cab. It's 20 to four, our c--ks are fat and f-----g ready to spurt sauce and you're in bed. F--k me, fire up you sad c--t." Gasnier was dropped from the NSW squad and subsequently fined and suspended from his NRL club. Gasnier was recalled for the deciding game 3 in the State of Origin series, scoring 2 tries on debut and winning the series.

After winning Dally M Centre of the Year in 2005, he signed a new one-year contract, with further one year options for the next four years with the St George Illawarra Dragons. Again Gasnier won the Dally M Centre of the Year.

In early 2007 it was announced that Mark Gasnier, Ben Hornby and Jason Ryles would captain St George Illawarra. Controversially, given his reputation as centre, Gasnier was moved to Five-eighth for the Dragons following Trent Barrett's move to the Wigan Warriors. However, Gasnier tore his pectoral muscle tackling Nigel Vagana in the Charity Shield pre-season trial and was unable to play again until July. On 21 July, Gasnier made his long-awaited return to the Dragons, in the five-eighth position, with his team winning 38–20 against the Penrith Panthers. Despite Gasnier's shortened season, he was selected for the Australian Kangaroos in October to play the New Zealand Kiwis in Wellington. Gasnier spent 24 minutes on the field before being knocked out by a Steve Matai high tackle. Suffering from concussion, Gasnier was unable to participate further in the game.

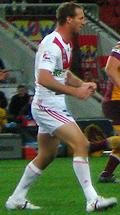
Gasnier playing for the Dragons in 2008

Gasnier was named sole captain of the Dragons for the 2008 season. He paired up with Matt Cooper in the centres. Gasnier was selected to play for Australia on 9 May and scored the first two tries. He was selected for Origin I against the Maroons, and helped set up five tries. He was also picked for Origin II despite carrying an injury, but was unable to play the third game. In July, Gasnier reported that he would switch to rugby union at the end of the season to link up with French club Stade Français. Gasnier played his final game for the Dragons against the Manly Sea Eagles at Brookvale in the 3rd Qualifying Final, scoring the Dragons' only points.

=== Rugby union stint ===
Gasnier joined French rugby union club Stade Français from October 2008 on a two-year deal worth approximately €300,000 a season. At the Paris club, he was coached by former NSW Waratahs coach Ewen McKenzie. For his début with Stade Français on 26 September 2008, Gasnier played right wing and ran in for a try, finishing off a fine display of passing rugby by the Stade backs, against Bourgoin-Jallieu at the Stade des Alpes in Grenoble before getting injured. On 24 January 2009 he scored the decisive try in a Heineken Cup victory over Ulster. Gasnier also scored a brilliant solo try beating eight defenders in a 30-metre run to the line in Stade Français' 23–18 victory over French rivals SC Albigeois at the Stade Jean Bouin in Paris on 5 November 2009. He is known as "Les Gaz!" by the fans.

Gasnier continued his prolific 2009–10 season by scoring his 6th try of the campaign against Bayonne in round 15 in front of more than 70,000 fans at the Stade de France in Paris. This made him the Top 14's leading try scorer and he continued to impress after switching codes. In April–May 2010 Gasnier was reportedly talking with coach Rod Macqueen about the possibility of Gasnier signing with the Melbourne Rebels for the team's début in the expanded Super 14.

=== Return to rugby league ===
It was announced in June 2010 that Gasnier was intending to return to rugby league following the expiration of his rugby union contract. This was confirmed when he signed a 4 1/2-year deal with former club St George Illawarra.

Gasnier made his comeback for the Dragons against the Penrith Panthers but the Dragons lost 12–8. His second match however was more of a success, as he scored the match winning try for the Dragons as they defeated the South Sydney Rabbitohs 16–13. He went on to play for the Dragons' in the 2010 NRL Grand Final, scoring the first try of the match to help the joint-venture club beat the Sydney Roosters and claim its first premiership.

Gasnier in 2011

Gasnier participated in the Dragons' 2011 World Club Challenge and Charity Shield wins.

His good form led to him being selected to join the New South Wales team again for the 2011 State of Origin series. He played all three matches.

On 14 July, he formally announced his retirement from professional rugby league. He finished his career in a semi-final clash at Suncorp Stadium against the Brisbane Broncos, with St. George Illawarra losing 13–12, after a Darren Lockyer field goal in extra time. He then went on to work as a commentator with Fox League. On 28 November 2024, it was announced that Gasnier had joined the Parramatta coaching staff.

== Accolades ==
On 20 July 2022, Gasnier was named in the St. George Dragons District Rugby League Clubs team of the century at centre. The selection caused some controversy as Gasnier had never played for the St. George Dragons club. Although many consider St. George and St. George Illawarra to be the same club, the NRL has stated that both clubs are separate entities.

== See also ==
- List of players who have converted from one football code to another
