= Ben Hornby =

Australia international rugby league footballer

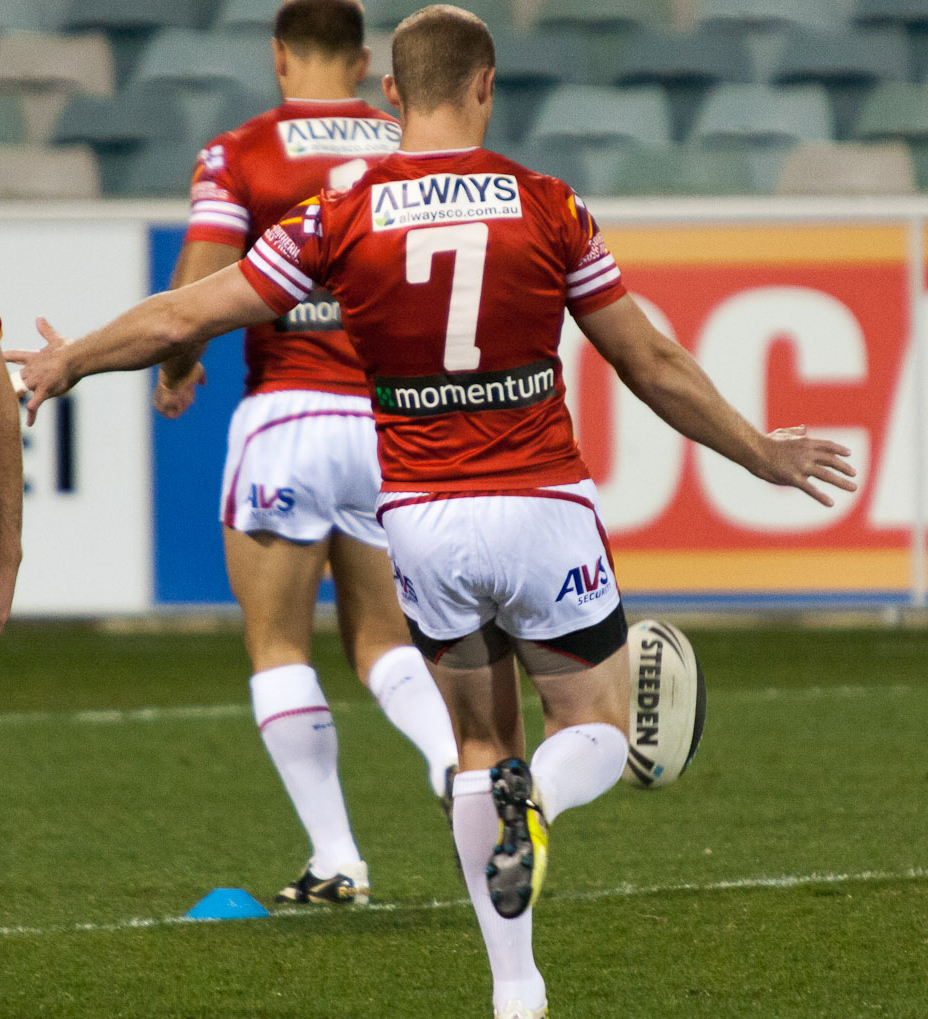

Personal information
- Born: 18 February 1980 (age 46) Wollongong, New South Wales, Australia
- Height: 182 cm (6 ft 0 in)
- Weight: 86 kg (13 st 8 lb)

Playing information
- Position: Halfback, Fullback, Five-eighth
Club
Years	Team	Pld	T	G	FG	P
2000–12	St. George Illawarra	273	59	12	2	262
Representative
Years	Team	Pld	T	G	FG	P
2005–08	Country NSW	3	0	0	0	0
2004–08	New South Wales	3	0	0	0	0
2006	Australia	1	0	0	0	0

Coaching information
Club
Years	Team	Gms	W	D	L	W%
2024	South Sydney	17	6	0	11	35
- Source: As of 6 November 2026

Ben Hornby (born 18 February 1980) is an Australian professional rugby league coach who is an assistant coach at the South Sydney Rabbitohs in the NRL and a former professional rugby league footballer who played in the 2000s and 2010s. An Australia international and New South Wales State of Origin representative back, he captained the St George Illawarra Dragons of the National Rugby League from 2009 until his retirement in 2012. Hornby played his entire career with the Dragons, leading them to the 2010 NRL Premiership and becoming their most capped player since the formation of the joint venture club in 1999. He was interim head coach at South Sydney during the 2024 NRL season.

== Early life ==
Hornby was born in Wollongong, New South Wales, Australia. He went to Corrimal Public School and Corrimal High School.

== Playing career ==
Hornby began his NRL rugby league career in round 23 of the 2000 NRL season against Penrith which ended in a 42-12 loss at Penrith Stadium. In the 2005 NRL season, Hornby played 25 games for St. George Illawarra as they finished second on the table. Hornby played in their upset preliminary final loss against the Wests Tigers. The following season, Hornby played 27 games for St. George Illawarra as they once again reached another preliminary final with the opponent this time being Melbourne. St. George Illawarra would lose the match 24-10.

Previously a co-captain in 2007, in 2009 coach Wayne Bennett appointed Hornby captain of St. George from the start of the 2009 NRL season. Hornby would play 26 games for the club in 2009 as they claimed the Minor Premiership but were eliminated from the finals in straight sets. Hornby was selected for Country in the City vs Country match on 8 May 2009. However, he did not play in the match after withdrawing with injury.

On 3 October 2010, Hornby captained St. George Illawarra to their first Premiership in 31 years, when they defeated the Sydney Roosters 32–8 in the 2010 NRL Grand Final. He went on to captain the club to victory in the following February's 2011 World Club Challenge against the Wigan Warriors in England. Hornby announced his retirement from St. George Illawarra in August 2012 after playing 13 seasons for the club.

=== Representative career ===
He represented New South Wales in the State of Origin series of 2004, 2006 and 2008 and played one match for Australia, their loss to Great Britain during the 2006 Rugby League Tri-Nations.

== Career highlights ==
- Junior Club: Corrimal Cougars
- First Grade Debut: Round 23, St George Illawarra v Penrith at Penrith, 8 July 2000
- Representative Record: Under 19 Australia 1999, Under 19s NSW 1999, Origin NSW 2004, City vs Country 2005 and 2006, NSW 2006, Junior Kangaroos 2006, Australia 2006
- Captaincy: Round 1, St George Illawarra v Melbourne Storm at Melbourne, 2009
- Premiership: Grand Final, St George Illawarra v Sydney Roosters at ANZ Stadium, 3 October 2010
- Inducted as a life member 2024.

== Coaching career ==
Upon retiring in 2012, Hornby began his coaching career as the junior development coach for St. George before becoming an assistant to the first grade side in later years.

In 2020, Hornby joined the South Sydney Rabbitohs club as the development coach.

Since 2021, he was the assistant coach to Wayne Bennett and later Jason Demetriou.

On 30 April 2024, Hornby was named as interim head coach at South Sydney after the club sacked Demetriou following a string of poor results which saw South Sydney at the bottom of the table.

In Hornby's first game in charge against Penrith, South Sydney would lose 42-12. It would be the same score line and opponent that he experienced during his first grade debut as a player.

Hornby earned his first win in charge of South Sydney in round 12 of the 2024 NRL season as they defeated Parramatta 42-26.

Hornby would then guide South Sydney on a five-game winning run which took the club away from the wooden spoon zone. However, in South Sydney's last nine games, they recorded only one victory and finished second last on the table only two points clear of last placed Wests Tigers.
