= 2004 North Queensland Cowboys season =

Coordinates: 19°18′58″S 146°42′43″E

- NRL Rank: 7th
- Play-off result: Lost preliminary final
- 2004 record: Wins: 12; draws: 1; losses: 11
- Points scored: For: 526; against: 514

Team information
- CEO: Denis Keeffe
- Coach: Graham Murray
- Captain: Travis Norton
- Stadium: Dairy Farmers Stadium
- Avg. attendance: 17,334
- High attendance: 25,986 (vs. Brisbane Broncos, Round 6)

Top scorers
- Tries: Ty Williams (15)
- Goals: Josh Hannay (98)
- Points: Josh Hannay (228)
← 2003	2005 →

The 2004 North Queensland Cowboys season was the 10th in the club's history. Coached by Graham Murray and captained by Travis Norton, they competed in the NRL's 2004 Telstra Premiership. It was the first time the club had made the finals, finishing the regular season in 7th, falling one game short of the Grand Final.

== Season summary ==
=== Milestones ===
- Round 1: Rod Jensen, Travis Norton, Luke O'Donnell and Mitchell Sargent made their debuts for the club.
- Round 3: Chris Sheppard played his 50th game for the club.
- Round 7: Shane Tronc made his NRL debut.
- Round 8: Ty Williams played his 50th game for the club.
- Round 8: Josh Hannay played his 100th game for the club.
- Round 11: David Faiumu made his NRL debut.
- Round 14: Steve Southern made his NRL debut.
- Round 15: Matt Sing played his 50th game for the club.
- Round 19: Matthew Scott made his NRL debut.
- Round 19: Leigh McWilliams played his 50th game for the club.
- Finals Week 3: David Myles played his 50th game for the club.

== Squad List ==
North Queensland Cowboys NRL Squad 2004
First team squad				Coaching staff
Clint Amos – HK; Brenton Bowen – WG; Matthew Bowen – FB; Paul Bowman – CE; Kevin Campion – LK; Mark Dalle Cort – SR; David Faiumu – HK; Nathan Fien – HB; Steven Goodhew – HK; Josh Hannay – CE; Rod Jensen – LK; Ben Laity – PR	Jacob Lillyman – SR; Ben Lowe – LK; Jaiman Lowe – PR; Micheal Luck – SR; Jamie McDonald – PR; Leigh McWilliams – HK; Michael Meigan – CE; Aaron Morgan – WG; Glenn Morrison – LK; David Myles – FE; Travis Norton (c) – LK; Luke O'Donnell – SR	Aaron Payne – HK; Paul Rauhihi – PR; Mitchell Sargent – PR; Matthew Scott – PR; Chris Sheppard – FE; Matt Sing – WG; Daniel Sorbello – FB; Steve Southern – SR; Daniel Strickland – SR; Neil Sweeney – WG; Shane Tronc – PR; Hale Vaa'sa – CE	Derrick Watkins – LK; Ty Williams – WG	Head coach: Graham Murray; Assistant coach: Neil Henry (assistant coach); Legend: (c) Captain(s); (vc) Vice-captain(s)

== Squad Movement ==
=== 2004 Gains ===
Player	Signed from
Clint Amos	Norths Devils
Mark Dalle Cort	St George Illawarra Dragons
David Faiumu	Central Comets
Rod Jensen	Canberra Raiders
Travis Norton	Canterbury Bulldogs
Luke O'Donnell	Wests Tigers
Mitchell Sargent	Melbourne Storm
Steve Southern	St George Illawarra Dragons
Shane Tronc	Redcliffe Dolphins
Hale Vaa'sa	Mt Albert Lions

=== 2004 Losses ===
Player	Signed from
Jason Barsley	Easts Tigers
John Buttigieg	Retired
Luke Cross	Penrith Panthers
Dane Campbell	Easts Tigers
Paul Dezolt	Warriors
George Gatis	Released
Paul McNicholas	Hull F.C.
Chris Muckert	Parramatta Eels
Shane Muspratt	Parramatta Eels
Simon Phillips	Wynnum Manly Seagulls
Grant Reibel	Retired
David Thompson	South Sydney Rabbitohs
Scott Whiting	Wests Panthers

== Ladder ==
2004 NRL season
Pos	Team	Pld	W	D	L	B	PF	PA	PD	Pts
1	Sydney Roosters	24	19	0	5	2	710	368	+342	42
2	Canterbury-Bankstown Bulldogs (P)	24	19	0	5	2	760	491	+269	42
3	Brisbane Broncos	24	16	1	7	2	602	533	+69	37
4	Penrith Panthers	24	15	0	9	2	672	567	+105	34
5	St George Illawarra Dragons	24	14	0	10	2	624	415	+209	32
6	Melbourne Storm	24	13	0	11	2	684	517	+167	30
7	North Queensland Cowboys	24	12	1	11	2	526	514	+12	29
8	Canberra Raiders	24	11	0	13	2	554	613	−59	26
9	Wests Tigers	24	10	0	14	2	509	534	−25	24
10	Newcastle Knights	24	10	0	14	2	516	617	−101	24
11	Cronulla-Sutherland Sharks	24	10	0	14	2	528	645	−117	24
12	Parramatta Eels	24	9	0	15	2	517	626	−109	22
13	Manly-Warringah Sea Eagles	24	9	0	15	2	615	754	−139	22
14	New Zealand Warriors	24	6	0	18	2	427	693	−266	16
15	South Sydney Rabbitohs	24	5	2	17	2	455	812	−357	16

== Fixtures ==
=== Regular season ===
Date	Round	Opponent	Venue	Score	Tries	Goals	Attendance
13 March	Round 1	Manly Sea Eagles	Dairy Farmers Stadium	20 – 24	Bowman, Sheppard, Williams	Hannay (4/5)	17,952
	Round 2	Bye					
27 March	Round 3	Canberra Raiders	Dairy Farmers Stadium	18 – 19	Fien, Morrison, Norton	Hannay (3/5)	14,138
3 April	Round 4	Wests Tigers	Dairy Farmers Stadium	8 – 18	Sargent	Hannay (2/2)	11,238
10 April	Round 5	Cronulla Sharks	Toyota Park	36 – 10	M. Bowen (2), Hannay, Morrison, Myles, Payne	Hannay (6/6)	9,242
17 April	Round 6	Brisbane Broncos	Dairy Farmers Stadium	12 – 19	Campion, Morrison	Hannay (2/3)	25,896
24 April	Round 7	Melbourne Storm	Olympic Park	6 – 28	Hannay	Hannay (1/1)	6,875
1 May	Round 8	Parramatta Eels	Parramatta Stadium	24 – 20	Norton (2), Myles, Sweeney	Hannay (3/3), Sweeney (1/1)	8,277
8 May	Round 9	Warriors	Dairy Farmers Stadium	16 – 8	Williams (2), Fien	Hannay (2/4)	13,062
15 May	Round 10	South Sydney Rabbitohs	Express Advocate Stadium	20 – 20	Bowman, Campion, Rauhihi	Hannay (4/5)	10,138
22 May	Round 11	Penrith Panthers	Dairy Farmers Stadium	18 – 22	Jensen, Morrison, Sweeney	Hannay (3/5)	13,985
	Round 12	Bye					
5 June	Round 13	St George Illawarra Dragons	WIN Stadium	14 – 12	M. Bowen, Faiumu, Williams	Hannay (1/3)	10,524
12 June	Round 14	Newcastle Knights	Dairy Farmers Stadium	30 – 6	McWilliams, Rauhihi, Sheppard, Sweeney, Tronc	Hannay (5/7)	14,974
20 June	Round 15	Warriors	Ericsson Stadium	28 – 26	Sing (2), Myles, Sweeney	Hannay (6/9)	6,793
26 June	Round 16	Canterbury Bulldogs	Dairy Farmers Stadium	18 – 32	Sing (2), M. Bowen	Hannay (3/6)	20,207
3 July	Round 17	Sydney Roosters	Express Advocate Stadium	22 – 32	B. Bowen, Fien, Payne	Hannay (5/6)	16,127
10 July	Round 18	Canberra Raiders	Canberra Stadium	28 – 32	M. Bowen, Hannay, Myles, Norton, Rauhihi	Hannay (4/6)	8,771
17 July	Round 19	Parramatta Eels	Dairy Farmers Stadium	28 – 6	Williams (2), Jensen, Tronc	Hannay (6/7)	13,872
25 July	Round 20	Newcastle Knights	EnergyAustralia Stadium	28 – 24	Norton (2), Myles, Southern, Williams	Hannay (4/5)	14,031
31 July	Round 21	St George Illawarra Dragons	Dairy Farmers Stadium	34 – 10	M. Bowen (2), Williams (2), Bowman, Hannay	Hannay (5/8)	17,262
8 August	Round 22	Canterbury Bulldogs	Sydney Showground	16 – 36	Payne, Rauhihi, Williams	Hannay (2/3)	10,988
13 August	Round 23	South Sydney Rabbitohs	Dairy Farmers Stadium	36 – 22	Hannay (2), M. Bowen, O'Donnell, Southern, Williams	Hannay (6/8)	16,007
21 August	Round 24	Penrith Panthers	Penrith Stadium	6 – 56	Luck	Hannay (1/1)	12,391
29 August	Round 25	Wests Tigers	Campbelltown Stadium	24 – 12	M. Bowen, Hannay, Myles, Williams	Hannay (4/5)	10,296
4 September	Round 26	Cronulla Sharks	Dairy Farmers Stadium	36 – 20	Jensen (2), M. Bowen, Hannay, Payne, Williams	Hannay (6/8)	21,674
Legend: Win Loss Draw Bye

=== Finals ===
Date	Round	Opponent	Venue	Score	Tries	Goals	Attendance
11 September	Qualifying Final	Canterbury Bulldogs	Telstra Stadium	30 – 22	Sing (3), M. Bowen, O'Donnell	Hannay (5/7)	18,371
18 September	Semi-final	Brisbane Broncos	Dairy Farmers Stadium	10 – 0	Myles	Hannay (3/3)	24,989
26 September	Preliminary Final	Sydney Roosters	Telstra Stadium	16 – 19	Williams (2), Bowman	Hannay (2/3)	43,048
Legend: Win Loss Draw Bye

== Statistics ==
Name	App	T	G	FG	Pts
Brenton Bowen	6	1	-	-	4
Matthew Bowen	23	11	-	-	44
Paul Bowman	21	4	-	-	16
Kevin Campion	15	2	-	-	8
David Faiumu	13	1	-	-	4
Nathan Fien	23	3	-	-	12
Josh Hannay	27	8	98	-	228
Rod Jensen	17	4	-	-	16
Jaiman Lowe	6	-	-	-	-
Micheal Luck	11	1	-	-	4
Jamie McDonald	10	-	-	-	-
Leigh McWilliams	20	1	-	-	4
Glenn Morrison	14	4	-	-	-
David Myles	26	7	-	-	28
Travis Norton	21	6	-	-	24
Luke O'Donnell	26	2	-	-	8
Aaron Payne	25	4	-	-	16
Paul Rauhihi	25	4	-	-	16
Mitchell Sargent	27	1	-	-	4
Matthew Scott	1	-	-	-	-
Chris Sheppard	7	2	-	-	8
Matt Sing	12	7	-	-	28
Daniel Sorbello	1	-	-	-	-
Steve Southern	16	2	-	-	8
Daniel Strickland	8	-	-	-	-
Neil Sweeney	15	4	1	-	18
Shane Tronc	18	2	-	-	8
Ty Williams	25	15	-	-	60
Totals		98	99	-	582

== Representatives ==
The following players played a representative match in 2004.

	City vs Country	State of Origin 1	State of Origin 2	State of Origin 3	Tri-Nations
Matthew Bowen	-	Queensland	Queensland	Queensland	Australia
Paul Bowman	-	Queensland	Queensland	-	-
Glenn Morrison	Country	-	-	-	-
Travis Norton	-	Queensland	-	-	-
Paul Rauhihi	-	-	-	-	New Zealand
Matt Sing	-	-	Queensland	Queensland	Australia

== Honours ==
=== League ===
- Dally M Prop of the Year: Paul Rauhihi

=== Club ===
- Player of the Year: Luke O'Donnell
- Players' Player: Paul Rauhihi
- Club Person of the Year: Dave Roberts

== Feeder Clubs ==
=== Queensland Cup ===
- North Queensland Young Guns - 7th, missed finals
