= 2004 Melbourne Storm season =

- NRL Rank: 6th
- Play-off result: Semi-final Loss
- 2004 record: Wins: 13; draws: 0; losses: 11
- Points scored: For: 684; against: 517

Team information
- CEO: Frank Stanton (Interim)
- Coach: Craig Bellamy
- Captain: Stephen Kearney (24 Games) Rodney Howe (1 Game) Robbie Kearns (1 Game)
- Stadium: Olympic Park
- Avg. attendance: 8,886
- High attendance: 10,621 (Round 16)

Top scorers
- Tries: Steven Bell (18)
- Goals: Matt Orford (56)
- Points: Matt Orford (153)
← 2003	List of seasons	2005 →

The 2004 Melbourne Storm season was the 7th in the club's history. They competed in the NRL's 2004 Telstra Premiership and finished the regular season 6th out of 15 teams.

Inconsistency plagued Storm in Craig Bellamy’s second season in charge, but the team won four games in a row during the middle part of the year to move into the top four. They could not maintain their run though, eventually finishing sixth. Once again Storm won its first final, a 31-14 triumph over the Broncos at Suncorp Stadium before bowing out to the Bulldogs for the second straight season the following week. John Ribot departed the club early in the 2004 season with Frank Stanton stepping in as acting CEO for the next 12 months.

== Season summary ==
- World Sevens – Storm avenge their 2003 loss to Lebanon in the Rugby League World Sevens, but fail to progress out of Pool C.
- 4 March – In the wake of the Coffs Harbour scandal overshadowing the start of the 2004 NRL season, reports emerge two Melbourne players are being accused of sexual assault, claims which are later ruled unfounded.
- 7 March – With a forthcoming bye in Round 1, Melbourne play foundation NSWRL club Newtown Jets in an extra trial match at Henson Park.
- 12 March – Club founder John Ribot resigns as executive director of the club. Ribot later sells his remaining shares in the club to News Limited. Ribot and News are forced to deny the decision was connected to Ribot's handling of allegations against two Melbourne players. Frank Stanton is appointed interim CEO of the club.
- 17 March – Coach Craig Bellamy agrees to a new contract to coach Melbourne until the end of 2007.
- Round 2 – Despite leading 14–10 at half time, Melbourne lose their first game for the season at home to Newcastle Knights.
- 28 April – Melbourne is found by the NRL to have exceeded the competition's salary cap in 2003 and are fined $130,956.
- Round 6 – Celebrating his 200th NRL game, Danny Williams scores two tries and adds a late conversion to bring up a 50–4 win over South Sydney Rabbitohs.
- Round 8 – Referee Tony Archer awards New Zealand Warriors goalkicker Sione Faumuina a second shot at goal after Melbourne captain Stephen Kearney deliberately threw a water bottle in his line of vision. The Warriors regain the Michael Moore Trophy with a 20–14 win in Auckland.
- 13 May – Outspoken Parramatta Eels CEO Denis Fitzgerald declares that Melbourne Storm be disbanded and forced to relocate to the Gold Coast, saying "promoting rugby league in Melbourne is akin to promoting beach volleyball in Iceland."
- Round 12 – Melbourne win their first ever game at EnergyAustralia Stadium, beating the Newcastle Knights 28–16. The club had previously lost six straight games at the venue.
- Round 14 – Despite reaching a 16–0 lead, Melbourne lose 28–26 to South Sydney Rabbitohs in Souths' caretaker coach Arthur Kitinas first game in charge.
- Round 16 – In a night of milestones with the club celebrating Robbie Kearns (250 games), Matt Geyer (150 games, 144 games for Melbourne to equal Marcus Bai's record); Storm thrash Warriors 42–6 to take back the Michael Moore Trophy.
- Round 17 – Melbourne blitz Penrith Panthers 66–14, setting new club records for the highest score and record winning margin at Olympic Park. Matt Orford scored a new club record 11 goals from 12 attempts.
- 14 July – Club captain Stephen Kearney announces he will be leaving Melbourne at the end of the season to finish his career with Super League club Hull F.C.
- Round 19 – Danny Williams is sent off for king-hitting Wests Tigers forward Mark O'Neill. O'Neill is cited and later found guilty of a careless high tackle on Williams, but receives no suspension. After the NRL judiciary hearing is adjourned for two weeks after evidence is introduced claiming Williams was suffering "post-traumatic amnesia", he receives a 18-match suspension, the longest suspension handed down in over a decade.
- Round 20 – Scoring 18 points (3 tries, 3 goals) himself, a controversial last second Matt Orford try hands Melbourne a 22–16 win against Parramatta. Eels coach Brian Smith furious with video referee Chris Ward to award the Orford try, calling the decision "disgusting".
- Round 23 – Jeremy Smith makes his NRL debut, scoring a try with his first touch of the ball. Smith is the first former Melbourne Storm junior to play with the club.
- Round 24 – In their last game at Olympic Park, Rodney Howe and Stephen Kearney lead Melbourne to a 22–12 victory over Canterbury-Bankstown Bulldogs, the club's first win against that club since 2000.
- September 13 – News Limited appoint former St Kilda CEO Brian Waldron as the club's new CEO.
- Round 26 – Secure in sixth position on the NRL ladder, Craig Bellamy rests a number of players from the club's final regular season game against Manly. Melbourne lose 30–28 with Bellamy expressing his anger at match referee Steve Lyons and video referee Paul Simpkins over a number of contentious decisions.
- September 7 – With 23 points, Matt Orford finishes in a tied for third in the 2004 Dally M Medal count, four points behind winner Danny Buderus.
- Qualifying Final – Down 8–0 at half time, Melbourne stun the Brisbane Broncos in a pulsating second half, winning 31–14 at Suncorp Stadium. Matt Orford also kicks the first field goal for Melbourne in over five years.
- Semi Final – For the second straight season, Melbourne are eliminated from the NRL finals by the Bulldogs, this time going down 43–18 at Aussie Stadium. Down 16–0 early, Melbourne were never really in the match, in what was former captain Rodney Howe's last game of rugby league.

=== Milestone games ===
Round	Player	Milestone
Round 2	Ben MacDougall	Storm debut
Round 2	Alex Chan	Storm debut
Round 3	Steve Turner	Storm debut
Round 6	Danny Williams	200th game
Round 7	David Kidwell	100th game
Round 8	Kirk Reynoldson	50th game
Round 9	Cooper Cronk	NRL debut
Round 12	Stephen Kearney	200th game
Round 16	Matt Geyer	150th game
Round 19	Scott Hill	150th game
Round 21	Robbie Kearns	250th game
Round 22	Matt Orford	100th game
Round 22	Rodney Howe	150th game
Round 23	Jeremy Smith	NRL debut
Round 26	Andrew McFadden	100th game

=== Jerseys ===
Melbourne's jerseys were unchanged from the designs implemented by Canterbury of New Zealand in 2003. The club's clash colours were again a mostly white design with a purple chevron and gold thunderbolts, worn with navy shorts. Honda finished up as sponsor at the end of 2003, and there was no sleeve sponsor for 2004.

== Fixtures ==
=== Pre Season ===
Date	Round	Opponent	Venue	Result	Mel.	Opp.	Source
24 January	Rugby League World Sevens	Lebanon	Aussie Stadium, Sydney	Won	27	22	
24 January	Rugby League World Sevens	St George Illawarra Dragons	Aussie Stadium, Sydney	Lost	10	29	
25 January	Rugby League World Sevens	Canterbury-Bankstown Bulldogs	Aussie Stadium, Sydney	Lost	17	22	

Date	Rd	Opponent	Venue	Result	Mel.	Opp.	Tries	Goals	Field goals	Ref
14 February	Trial	Tweed Heads Seagulls	Noosa District Sports Complex, Tewantin	Won	28	14	—N/a	—N/a		
21 February	Trial	Brisbane Broncos	Clive Berghofer Stadium, Toowoomba	Lost	10	14	M Geyer, S Hill	M Geyer (1)		
28 February	Trial	Canberra Raiders	Eric Weissel Oval, Wagga Wagga	Lost	20	30	G Turner, F Moala, M King, B Slater	C Smith (2)		
6 March	Trial	Newtown Jets	Henson Park, Sydney	Won	54	0	S Turner (3), F Moala (2), M King (2), B Slater, P Robinson, K Reynoldson	C Smith (5), M Geyer		

=== Regular season ===
==== Result by round ====
Round	1	2	3	4	5	6	7	8	9	10	11	12	13	14	15	16	17	18	19	20	21	22	23	24	25	26
Ground	–	H	H	A	A	H	H	A	H	A	H	A	H	A	–	H	H	A	A	H	H	A	A	H	A	A
Result	B	L	W	L	L	W	W	L	L	W	W	W	W	L	B	W	W	L	L	W	L	L	W	W	W	L
Position	8	11	3	8	11	8	5	7	9	6	7	5	5	5	5	5	4	4	5	5	5	6	6	6	6	6
Points	2	2	4	4	4	6	8	8	8	10	12	14	16	16	18	20	22	22	22	24	24	24	26	28	30	30

Source: Rugby League Tables
A = Away; H = Home; N = Neutral; B = Bye; W = Win; D = Draw; L = Loss

==== Matches ====
- (g.p.) – Golden Point extra time
- (pen) – Penalty try

Date	Rd	Opponent	Venue	Result	Mel.	Opp.	Tries	Goals	Field goals	Ref
13 March	1	Bye								
21 March	2	Newcastle Knights	Olympic Park, Melbourne	Lost	26	36	S Hill, F Moala, B Slater, G Turner	C Smith 5/5		
28 March	3	St George Illawarra Dragons	Olympic Park, Melbourne	Won	34	6	S Turner (2), D Cooper, M King, B MacDougall, M Orford	C Smith 4/7, D Cooper 1/1		
4 April	4	Brisbane Broncos	Suncorp Stadium, Brisbane	Lost	26	34	M King (2), S Hill, R Hoffman, B Slater	C Smith 3/5, M Orford 0/1		
11 April	5	Penrith Panthers	Penrith Park, Sydney	Lost	26	30	M King (2), D Cooper, M Orford, P Robinson	C Smith 3/5		
17 April	6	South Sydney Rabbitohs	Olympic Park, Melbourne	Won	50	4	J Webster (3), D Williams (2), D Cooper, D Kidwell, M Orford, C Smith	C Smith 5/6, M Orford 1/1, D Williams 1/1, D Cooper 1/1		
24 April	7	North Queensland Cowboys	Olympic Park, Melbourne	Won	28	6	S Bell, M Geyer, D Johnson, K Reynoldson, B Slater	C Smith 3/5, M Orford 1/1		
2 May	8	New Zealand Warriors	Ericsson Stadium, Auckland	Lost	14	20	S Bell (2), S Hill	C Smith 1/3		
8 May	9	Cronulla-Sutherland Sharks	Olympic Park, Melbourne	Lost	26	36	S Bell (2), D Cooper (2), B Slater	C Smith 3/5		
16 May	10	Parramatta Eels	Parramatta Stadium, Sydney	Won	36	16	D Cooper (2), S Bell, D Johnson, R Kearns, C Smith	C Smith 6/8		
22 May	11	Canberra Raiders	Olympic Park, Melbourne	Won	22	18	C Cronk, S Hill, S Kearney, B MacDougall	M Orford 3/4		
29 May	12	Newcastle Knights	EnergyAustralia Stadium, Newcastle	Won	28	18	M Geyer (3), S Hill, B Slater	C Smith 4/5		
5 June	13	Wests Tigers	Olympic Park, Melbourne	Won	30	24	S Bell, D Johnson, R Kearns, D Kidwell, B Slater	M Orford 3/4, C Smith 2/3		
12 June	14	South Sydney Rabbitohs	Aussie Stadium, Sydney	Lost	26	28	A Chan (2), S Bell, D Cooper, D Kidwell	M Orford 3/5		
19 June	15	Bye								
26 June	16	New Zealand Warriors	Olympic Park, Melbourne	Won	42	6	M King (3), B MacDougall (2), S Bell, D Kidwell, B Slater	M Orford 4/7, D Cooper 1/1		
2 July	17	Penrith Panthers	Olympic Park, Melbourne	Won	66	14	S Turner (3), C Cronk (2), M King (2), S Hill, R Hoffman, D Kidwell, B MacDougall	M Orford 11/12		
11 July	18	Canterbury-Bankstown Bulldogs	Sydney Showground, Sydney	Lost	18	25	D Kidwell, B Slater, C Smith	M Orford 3/3		
17 July	19	Wests Tigers	Leichhardt Oval, Sydney	Lost	18	32	B Slater (2), M Orford	M Orford 3/3		
24 July	20	Parramatta Eels	Olympic Park, Melbourne	Won	22	16	M Orford (3), M King	M Orford 3/5		
1 August	21	Sydney Roosters	Olympic Park, Melbourne	Lost	10	26	M King, C Smith	M Orford 1/2		
6 August	22	St George Illawarra Dragons	WIN Stadium, Wollongong	Lost	14	34	S Bell, M King, M Orford	M Orford 1/3		
15 August	23	Canberra Raiders	Canberra Stadium, Canberra	Won	36	18	S Bell, M Geyer, M King, B MacDougall, M Orford, B Slater, J Smith	M Orford 4/7		
22 August	24	Canterbury-Bankstown Bulldogs	Olympic Park, Melbourne	Won	22	12	S Bell, S Hill, D Johnson	M Orford 5/6		
28 August	25	Cronulla-Sutherland Sharks	Toyota Park, Sydney	Won	36	28	M Geyer (2), S Bell, D Johnson, D Kidwell, B MacDougall, B Slater	M Orford 4/7, S Kearney 0/1		
5 September	26	Manly Warringah Sea Eagles	Brookvale Oval, Sydney	Lost	28	30	S Bell (2), S Hill (2), C Cronk	C Smith 4/5		

=== Finals ===
Qualifying final

Saturday, 11 September
18:40 AEST (UTC+10)

Brisbane Broncos	14 – 31	Melbourne Storm
Tries: 2 Carroll 17'; Tate 66'; Goals: 3 Lockyer pen 11', 18', 67' (3/3)	1st: 8–0; 2nd: 6–31; Report	Tries: 6 Hill 42'; Bell 47'; King 50'; Slater 59'; Orford 70'; Geyer 79'; Goals: 3 Orford 43', 60', 71' (3/6); Field goals: 1 Orford 74'

Suncorp Stadium, Brisbane
Attendance: 31,100
Referee: Steve Clark
Touch judges: Shayne Hayne, Paul Kalina
Player of the Match: Dallas Johnson (Melbourne)

Semi final

Sunday, 19 September
15:45 AEST (UTC+10)

Canterbury-Bankstown Bulldogs	43 – 18	Melbourne Storm
Tries: 7 Thurston 48', 80'; Perry 3'; Ryan 9'; El Masri 12'; Tonga 36'; Patten 52'; Goals: 7 El Masri 4', 10', 37', 49', 54', pen 64', 80' (7/8); Field goals: 1 Sherwin 71'	1st: 22–6; 2nd: 21–12; Report	Tries: 3 Bell 16', 56'; Slater 58'; Goals: 3 Orford 17', 57', 59' (3/3)

Aussie Stadium, Sydney
Attendance: 23,750
Referee: Paul Simpkins
Touch judges: Shayne Hayne, Steve Carrall
Player of the Match: Brent Sherwin (Canterbury)

== Ladder ==
2004 NRL season
Pos	Team	Pld	W	D	L	B	PF	PA	PD	Pts
1	Sydney Roosters	24	19	0	5	2	710	368	+342	42
2	Canterbury-Bankstown Bulldogs (P)	24	19	0	5	2	760	491	+269	42
3	Brisbane Broncos	24	16	1	7	2	602	533	+69	37
4	Penrith Panthers	24	15	0	9	2	672	567	+105	34
5	St George Illawarra Dragons	24	14	0	10	2	624	415	+209	32
6	Melbourne Storm	24	13	0	11	2	684	517	+167	30
7	North Queensland Cowboys	24	12	1	11	2	526	514	+12	29
8	Canberra Raiders	24	11	0	13	2	554	613	−59	26
9	Wests Tigers	24	10	0	14	2	509	534	−25	24
10	Newcastle Knights	24	10	0	14	2	516	617	−101	24
11	Cronulla-Sutherland Sharks	24	10	0	14	2	528	645	−117	24
12	Parramatta Eels	24	9	0	15	2	517	626	−109	22
13	Manly-Warringah Sea Eagles	24	9	0	15	2	615	754	−139	22
14	New Zealand Warriors	24	6	0	18	2	427	693	−266	16
15	South Sydney Rabbitohs	24	5	2	17	2	455	812	−357	16

== 2004 Coaching Staff ==
- Head coach: Craig Bellamy
- Assistant coaches: Dean Lance & Peter Sharp
- Football Manager: Greg Brentnall
- Physical Preparation Coach: Alex Corvo
- Physiotherapist: Matt Natusch
- Head Trainer: Troy Thompson

== 2004 squad ==
List current as of 20 September 2021

Cap (Note: Players are listed with the cap number as they appear on the Melbourne Storm honour board. Additional squad members do not have a cap number.)	Nat.	Player name	Position	First Storm Game	Previous First Grade RL club (Note: This column denotes the previous RL club the player was signed to and played first grade RL for. If they are yet to debut then this is stipulated. If they were merely signed to the club but did not play then it is not counted.)
1	(Australia)	Robbie Ross	FB	1998	(Australia) Hunter Mariners
6	(Australia)	Scott Hill	FE	1998	(Australia) Hunter Mariners
8	(Australia)	Rodney Howe	PR	1998	(Australia) Perth Reds
9	(Australia)	Danny Williams	LK, SR, HK	1998	(Australia) North Sydney Bears
10	(Australia)	Robbie Kearns	PR	1998	(Australia) Perth Reds
18	(Australia)	Matt Geyer	WG	1998	(Australia) Perth Reds
28	(New Zealand)	Stephen Kearney	SR	1999	(Australia) New Zealand Warriors
34	(Tonga)	Fifita Moala	WG	2000	(Australia) Melbourne Storm
37	(New Zealand)	Glen Turner	SR	2000	(Australia) Melbourne Storm
38	(Australia)	Peter Robinson	SR	2000	(Australia) Melbourne Storm
43	(Australia)	Matt Orford	HB	2001	(Australia) Northern Eagles
44	(Australia)	Steven Bell	CE	2001	(Australia) Melbourne Storm
55	(Australia)	Cameron Smith	HK	2002	(Australia) Melbourne Storm
56	(Australia)	Kirk Reynoldson	SR	2002	(Australia) Melbourne Storm
58	(Australia)	Billy Slater	FB	2003	(Australia) Melbourne Storm
59	(New Zealand)	David Kidwell	SR	2003	(Australia) Sydney Roosters
60	(Australia)	Dallas Johnson	LK	2003	(Australia) Melbourne Storm
61	(New Zealand)	Jake Webster	WG	2003	(Australia) Melbourne Storm
62	(Australia)	Ryan Hoffman	SR	2003	(Australia) Melbourne Storm
63	(Australia)	Andrew McFadden	HB	2003	(Australia) Parramatta Eels
64	(New Zealand)	Robert Tanielu	PR	2003	(Australia) Brisbane Broncos
66	(Australia)	Dustin Cooper	WG	2003	(Australia) Melbourne Storm
67	(Australia)	Nathan Friend	HK	2003	(Australia) Brisbane Broncos
68	(Australia)	Antonio Kaufusi	PR	2003	(Australia) Melbourne Storm
69	(Australia)	Matt King	CE	2003	(Australia) Melbourne Storm
70	(Australia)	Ben MacDougall	CE	2004	(Australia) Manly Warringah Sea Eagles
71	(New Zealand)	Alex Chan	PR	2004	(Australia) Parramatta Eels
72	(Australia)	Steve Turner	WG	2004	(Australia) Penrith Panthers
75	(Australia)	Cooper Cronk	HB	2004	(Australia) Melbourne Storm
76	(New Zealand)	Jeremy Smith	SR	2004	(Australia) Melbourne Storm
–	(Australia)	Luke Dyer	CE	Yet to debut	(Australia) Penrith Panthers (Note: Luke Dyer played in the 2004 World Sevens tournament for Melbourne before transferring back to Penrith Panthers, making his first grade debut against Melbourne later in the 2004 NRL season.)
–	(Tonga)	Sione Finefeuiaki	PR	Yet to debut	(Australia) Melbourne Storm

== Player movements ==
Losses

- Marcus Bai to Leeds Rhinos
- Junior Langi to Parramatta Eels
- Aaron Moule to Widnes Vikings
- Mitchell Sargent to North Queensland Cowboys
- Nathan Sologinkin to Released
- Semi Tadulala to Wakefield Trinity Wildcats

Gains

- Alex Chan from Parramatta Eels
- Ben MacDougall from Manly Warringah Sea Eagles
- Steve Turner from Penrith Panthers

== Representative honours ==
This table lists all players who have played a representative match in 2004.

Player	2004 ANZAC Test	City vs Country Origin	State of Origin 1	State of Origin 2	State of Origin 3	Tri-Nations (Note: Including Australian tour matches against Papua New Guinea, France, and USA)
Scott Hill	—N/a	Country	—N/a	—N/a	—N/a	Australia
Stephen Kearney	New Zealand	—N/a	—N/a	—N/a	—N/a	—N/a
David Kidwell	New Zealand	—N/a	—N/a	—N/a	—N/a	New Zealand
Matt King	—N/a	Country	—N/a	—N/a	—N/a	—N/a
Matt Orford	—N/a	City	—N/a	—N/a	—N/a	—N/a
Billy Slater	—N/a	—N/a	Queensland	Queensland	Queensland	—N/a
Cameron Smith	—N/a	—N/a	Queensland	Queensland	Queensland	—N/a

== Statistics ==
This table contains playing statistics for all Melbourne Storm players to have played in the 2004 NRL season.

- Statistics sources:

Name	Appearances	Tries	Goals	Field goals	Points
Steven Bell	24	18	0	0	72
Alex Chan	18	2	0	0	8
Dustin Cooper	13	8	2	0	36
Cooper Cronk	13	4	0	0	16
Nathan Friend	3	0	0	0	0
Matt Geyer	21	8	0	0	32
Scott Hill	24	10	0	0	40
Ryan Hoffman	20	2	0	0	8
Rodney Howe	23	0	0	0	0
Dallas Johnson	19	5	0	0	20
Antonio Kaufusi	6	0	0	0	0
Stephen Kearney	24	1	0	0	4
Robbie Kearns	22	2	0	0	8
David Kidwell	26	7	0	0	28
Matt King	20	15	0	0	60
Andrew McFadden	2	0	0	0	0
Ben MacDougall	22	7	0	0	28
Fifita Moala	1	1	0	0	4
Matt Orford	25	10	56	1	153
Kirk Reynoldson	20	1	0	0	4
Peter Robinson	6	1	0	0	4
Billy Slater	22	14	0	0	56
Cameron Smith	23	4	43	0	102
Jeremy Smith	2	1	0	0	4
Robert Tanielu	3	0	0	0	0
Glen Turner	10	1	0	0	4
Steve Turner	7	5	0	0	20
Jake Webster	6	3	0	0	12
Danny Williams	17	2	1	0	10
29 players used	—	132	102	1	733

=== Scorers ===
Most points in a game: 22 points

- Round 17 - Matt Orford (11 goals) vs Penrith Panthers

Most tries in a game: 3

- Round 6 - Jake Webster vs South Sydney Rabbitohs
- Round 12 - Matt Geyer vs Newcastle Knights
- Round 17 - Steve Turner vs Penrith Panthers
- Round 20 - Matt Orford vs Parramatta Eels
- Round 23 - Matt King vs New Zealand Warriors

=== Winning games ===
Highest score in a winning game: 66 points

- Round 17 vs Penrith Panthers

Lowest score in a winning game: 22 points

- Round 11 vs Canberra Raiders
- Round 20 vs Parramatta Eels

Greatest winning margin: 52 points

- Round 17 vs Penrith Panthers

Greatest number of games won consecutively: 4

- Round 10 - Round 13

=== Losing games ===
Highest score in a losing game: 28 points

- Round 26 vs Manly Warringah Sea Eagles

Lowest score in a losing game: 10 points

- Round 21 vs Sydney Roosters

Greatest losing margin: 25 points

- Semi Final vs Canterbury-Bankstown Bulldogs

Greatest number of games lost consecutively: 2

- Round 4 - Round 5
- Round 8 - Round 9
- Round 18 - Round 19
- Round 21 - Round 22

== Feeder Team ==
Melbourne Storm reserve players again travelled to Brisbane each week to play with Queensland Cup team Norths Devils. Coached for a second season by Gary Greinke, Norths returned to the finals, finishing second in the regular season behind eventual premiers Burleigh Bears. However, the Devils were bundled out of the finals in straight sets. Melbourne Storm rookie Jeremy Smith won the Devils Player of the Year Award.

During the season, Greg Inglis made his first grade debut as a 17-year-old, scoring two tries. Inglis would play six Queensland Cup games for the season, scoring eight tries, also representing Queensland in underage representative games.

2004 Queensland Cup
Pos	Team	Pld	W	D	L	PF	PA	PD	Pts
2	Norths Devils	22	15	1	6	789	503	+286	31

== Awards and honours ==
=== Melbourne Storm Awards Night ===
Held at Crown Palladium on Friday, 8 October:

- Melbourne Storm Player of the Year: Matt Orford
- Greg Brentnall Trophy (Coterie Award): Matt Orford
- Rookie of the Year: Matt King
- Clubman of the Year: Rodney Howe
- Mick Moore Chairman's Award: Stephen Kearney
- Hit of the Year: Dallas Johnson (round 16)

=== Dally M Awards Night ===
- Peter Frilingos Memorial Award: Billy Slater

=== Other awards ===
- The Footy Show Player of the Year: Matt Orford
