= 2004 South Sydney Rabbitohs season =

- NRL rank: First Grade

Team information
- CEO: (Australia)
- Coach: (Australia)
- Captain: (Australia)
- Stadium: Aussie Stadium

Top scorers
- Tries: (Australia)
- Goals: (Australia)
- Points: (Australia)
← 2003	2005 →

The 2004 South Sydney Rabbitohs season was the 95th in the club's history. Coached by Arthur Kitinas and Paul Langmack and captained by Bryan Fletcher and Ashley Harrison, they competed in the National Rugby League's 2004 Telstra Premiership, finishing the regular season 15th out of 15 teams, failing to reach the finals.

== Player movements ==
=== Gains ===
- Dean Byrne from St George Illawarra Dragons
- Glenn Hall from Canterbury-Bankstown Bulldogs
- Scott Logan from Hull F.C.
- Adam MacDougall from Newcastle Knights
- Willie Manu from Wests Tigers
- Shane Marteene from Canterbury-Bankstown Bulldogs
- Todd Polglase from Canterbury-Bankstown Bulldogs
- Steve Skinnon from Sydney Roosters
- David Thompson from North Queensland Cowboys

=== Losses ===
- Jamie Fitzgerald to Newcastle Knights
- Andrew Hart to London Broncos
- Wise Kativerata to Parramatta Eels
- Wade McKinnon to Parramatta Eels
- Duncan MacGillivray to Wakefield Trinity
- Nathan Merritt to Cronulla Sutherland Sharks
- Willie Peters to Widnes Vikings
- Frank Puletua to Penrith Panthers
- Russell Richardson to Newcastle Knights
- Chris Walker to Sydney Roosters

== Ladder ==
2004 NRL season
Pos	Team	Pld	W	D	L	B	PF	PA	PD	Pts
1	Sydney Roosters	24	19	0	5	2	710	368	+342	42
2	Canterbury-Bankstown Bulldogs (P)	24	19	0	5	2	760	491	+269	42
3	Brisbane Broncos	24	16	1	7	2	602	533	+69	37
4	Penrith Panthers	24	15	0	9	2	672	567	+105	34
5	St George Illawarra Dragons	24	14	0	10	2	624	415	+209	32
6	Melbourne Storm	24	13	0	11	2	684	517	+167	30
7	North Queensland Cowboys	24	12	1	11	2	526	514	+12	29
8	Canberra Raiders	24	11	0	13	2	554	613	−59	26
9	Wests Tigers	24	10	0	14	2	509	534	−25	24
10	Newcastle Knights	24	10	0	14	2	516	617	−101	24
11	Cronulla-Sutherland Sharks	24	10	0	14	2	528	645	−117	24
12	Parramatta Eels	24	9	0	15	2	517	626	−109	22
13	Manly-Warringah Sea Eagles	24	9	0	15	2	615	754	−139	22
14	New Zealand Warriors	24	6	0	18	2	427	693	−266	16
15	South Sydney Rabbitohs	24	5	2	17	2	455	812	−357	16

== Fixtures ==
=== Regular season ===
Round	Opponent	Result	Score	Date	Venue	Crowd	Ref
1	Sydney Roosters	Loss	16 – 26	Sunday 14 March	Sydney Football Stadium	15,516	
2	Wests Tigers	Win	17 – 16	Sunday 21 March	Sydney Football Stadium	11,293	
3	BYE						
4	Cronulla Sutherland Sharks	Win	36 – 12	Saturday 3 April	Sydney Football Stadium	11,017	
5	Parramatta Eels	Loss	20 – 41	Monday 12 April	Parramatta Stadium	18,128	
6	Melbourne Storm	Loss	4 – 50	Saturday 17 April	Olympic Park	8,553	
7	Canterbury-Bankstown Bulldogs	Loss	8 – 34	Monday 26 April	Sydney Football Stadium	12,276	
8	Newcastle Knights	Loss	8 – 24	Saturday 1 May	Newcastle International Sports Centre	15,571	
9	Penrith Panthers	Loss	4 – 38	Sunday 9 May	Penrith Park	11,618	
10	North Queensland Cowboys	Draw	20 – 20	Saturday 15 May	Grahame Park	10,138	
11	New Zealand Warriors	Loss	12 – 26	Sunday 23 May	Sydney Football Stadium	8,032	
12	Cronulla Sutherland Sharks	Loss	38 – 18	Saturday 29 May	Endeavour Field	13,721	
13	BYE						
14	Melbourne Storm	Win	28 – 26	Saturday 12 June	Sydney Football Stadium	6,855	
15	Manly-Warringah Sea Eagles	Win	34 – 30	Saturday 19 June	Brookvale Oval	9,864	
16	St George Illawarra Dragons	Loss	12 – 52	Sunday 27 June	Sydney Cricket Ground	23,741	
17	Brisbane Broncos	Loss	28 – 48	Sunday 4 July	Lang Park	19,942	
18	Penrith Panthers	Win	30 – 6	Sunday 11 July	Sydney Football Stadium	6,774	
19	New Zealand Warriors	Loss	20 – 34	Sunday 18 July	Mt Smart	7,894	
20	Sydney Roosters	Loss	12 – 22	Saturday 24 July	Sydney Football Stadium	13,564	
21	Newcastle Knights	Loss	22 – 31	Sunday 1 August	Sydney Football Stadium	10,972	
22	Wests Tigers	Loss	6 – 56	Sunday 8 August	Leichhardt Oval	19,402	
23	North Queensland Cowboys	Loss	22 – 36	Saturday 14 August	Willows Sports Complex	16,007	
24	Manly-Warringah Sea Eagles	Loss	22 – 50	Sunday 22 August	North Sydney Oval	14,855	
25	Brisbane Broncos	Draw	34 – 34	Saturday 28 August	Sydney Football Stadium	7,049	
26	Canberra Raiders	Loss	22 – 62	Saturday 4 September	Bruce Stadium	10,839	
