= 2004 NRL season =

Rugby league competition

2004 National Rugby League
- Teams: 15
- Premiers: Canterbury-Bankstown Bulldogs (8th title)
- Minor premiers: Sydney Roosters (16th title)
- Matches played: 189
- Points scored: 9,086
- Average attendance: 15,929
- Total attendance: 3,010,639
- Top points scorer: Hazem El Masri (342)
- Wooden spoon: South Sydney Rabbitohs (7th spoon)
- Dally M Medal: Danny Buderus
- Top try-scorer: Amos Roberts (23)

The 2004 NRL season (also known as the 2004 Telstra Premiership due to sponsorship from Telstra) was the 97th season of professional rugby league football in Australia, and the seventh run by the National Rugby League. Fifteen clubs competed during the regular season before the top eight finishing teams contested the finals series. The Canterbury-Bankstown Bulldogs defeated the Sydney Roosters in the 2004 NRL grand final and in doing so claimed their eighth premiership.

== Pre-season ==
The beginning of the season was largely overshadowed with several Bulldogs players questioned by police in relation to an alleged rape of a 20-year-old Coffs Harbour woman. An independent investigator, former New South Wales chief of detectives, would later fail to find any evidence of misconduct on behalf of the players, and no charges were pressed.

The 2004 World Club Challenge was held on Friday, 13 February 2004, at the Alfred McAlpine Stadium, Huddersfield, England. The game was contested by Bradford Bulls and Penrith Panthers and won by the home team.

The salary cap for the 2004 season was A$3.25 million per club for their 25 highest-paid players.

== Regular season ==
Due to a perceived emphasis in the game on defence, NRL referees were instructed to call out "surrender tackle" this season when ball carriers submit at the ruck, signalling the defence to slow down the tackle in order for defenders to reset.

The first round of the season began on Friday, 12 March with 2003 champions, the Penrith Panthers losing 14–20 to the Newcastle Knights before a crowd of 19,936 at Penrith Stadium.

During a match between the Broncos and the Tigers, the Broncos fielded 14 men at one stage of the Campbelltown Stadium match. In the 60th minute, Brisbane's Shane Webcke knocked out by Tiger Bryce Gibbs. Corey Parker was brought onto the ground while Webcke was still being assisted off. Parker immediately scored off a Darren Lockyer pass and started a Broncos revival (they trailed 24–8 at halftime) which later saw them win 24–32. But, after the fourteenth man was investigated, the Broncos were stripped of the two competition points, which were reinstated weeks later.

A significant comeback was seen in a round 25 clash between the St George Dragons and Manly. Trailing 34–10 after 53 minutes, St. George Illawarra came back to win the match 36–34. This match stood in second-place in the rankings of the biggest comebacks in Australian premiership history.

Several players and coaches also made the headlines for the wrong reasons. Jamie Lyon walked out on the Parramatta club after the first round citing burnout and dissatisfaction with living in Sydney, and would later move to the UK for a successful Super League career. Coaches Daniel Anderson and Paul Langmack would have their contracts terminated at the New Zealand Warriors and South Sydney Rabbitohs respectively.

Andrew Johns was injured in Newcastle's third game of the season against Parramatta, and subsequently missed the remainder of the season. The Knights missed the finals of the NRL for the first time since 1996.

2004 was also notable for the emergence of teenage players Sonny Bill Williams (Bulldogs) and Karmichael Hunt (Brisbane Broncos), and their performances, mature beyond their years, would be critical to the fortunes of their clubs.

A quirk of the draw meant that the Sydney Roosters did not play a premiership match in Queensland during the season, while there was only one Queensland derby contested during the regular season, in round six in Townsville.

The grand finals:

- Canterbury Bulldogs vs Sydney Roosters (NRL)
- St George Illawarra Dragons vs Sydney Roosters (NSW Cup)
- Cronulla Sharks vs Sydney Roosters (NSW Jersey Flegg Cup)

The winners in all grades were:

- Canterbury Bulldogs (Seniors Grade)
- Sydney Roosters (NSW Cup)
- Sydney Roosters (NSW Jersey Flegg Cup)

The test match

- Australia vs New Zealand

The State Of Origin Series

- Queensland vs New South Wales

=== Teams ===
The line-up of fifteen teams for the 2004 premiership remained unchanged from the previous season.

Brisbane Broncos; 17th season Ground: Suncorp Stadium; Coach: Wayne Bennett; Captain: Gorden Tallis	Canterbury-Bankstown Bulldogs; 70th season Ground: Sydney Showground & Telstra Stadium; Coach: Steve Folkes; Captain: Steve Price	Canberra Raiders; 23rd season Ground: Canberra Stadium; Coach: Matthew Elliott; Captain: Simon Woolford	Cronulla-Sutherland Sharks; 38th season Ground: Toyota Stadium; Coach: Stuart Raper; Captain: Brett Kimmorley	Manly Warringah Sea Eagles; 55th season Ground: Brookvale Oval; Coach: Des Hasler; Captain: Steve Menzies
Melbourne Storm; 7th season Ground Olympic Park; Coach: Craig Bellamy; Captain: Stephen Kearney	Newcastle Knights; 17th season Ground: EnergyAustralia Stadium; Coach: Michael Hagan; Captain: Andrew Johns	New Zealand Warriors; 10th season Ground: Ericsson Stadium; Coach: Daniel Anderson → Tony Kemp; Captain: Stacey Jones	North Queensland Cowboys; 10th season Ground: Dairy Farmers Stadium; Coach: Graham Murray; Captain: Travis Norton	Parramatta Eels; 58th season Ground: Parramatta Stadium; Coach: Brian Smith; Captain: Nathan Cayless
Penrith Panthers; 38th season Ground: Penrith Football Stadium; Coach: John Lang; Captain: Craig Gower	South Sydney Rabbitohs; 95th season Ground: Aussie Stadium; Coach: Paul Langmack → Arthur Kitinas; Captain: Bryan Fletcher	St. George Illawarra Dragons; 6th season Ground: OKI Jubilee Stadium & WIN Stadium; Coach: Nathan Brown; Captain: Trent Barrett	Sydney Roosters; 97th season Ground: Aussie Stadium; Coach: Ricky Stuart; Captain: Brad Fittler	Wests Tigers; 5th season Ground: Campbelltown Stadium & Leichhardt Oval; Coach: Tim Sheens; Captain: Scott Sattler & Darren Senter

=== Advertising ===
In 2004 the NRL and their advertising agency MJW Hakuhodo continued with their use of the Hoodoo Gurus' 1987 hit "What's My Scene" with reworked lyrics as "That's My Team".

In addition to the big 60-second season launch TV commercial, three shorter executions were produced: one targeting young men, another targeting women and one aimed at families. In a year where sexual assault allegations damaged perceptions and the reputation of the code, retaining female fans was seen as a massive challenge.

=== Statistics and records ===
- Anthony Minichiello ran 4,590 metres with the ball in 2004, more than any other player in the competition.
- Hazem El Masri's tally of 342 points from 2004 still stands as the individual record for most points scored in a season in Australian club rugby league history.
- The St. George Illawarra Dragons's club record for their biggest comeback was set at 24 points when they came from 34–10 down with only 25 minutes remaining to win 36–34 against the Manly-Warringah Sea Eagles.
- The Brisbane Broncos' 10–0 loss to the Cowboys was their first ever against the Townsville-based club, and the first time they had been held scoreless in Queensland.
- The Wests Tigers were held scoreless in consecutive weeks (rounds 15 and 16), those two rounds, the Tigers conceded 50+ points, a 50–0 loss to St. George Illawarra Dragons in round 15 and a 56–0 loss to the Sydney Roosters in round 16. Also the Tigers were held scoreless twice against the Roosters, the other time, a 22–0 scoreline in round 9.
- The North Queensland Cowboys' round 25 clash against the Wests Tigers was their first match broadcast by the Nine Network since round 1, 1995.

=== Ladder ===
2004 NRL season
Pos	Team	Pld	W	D	L	B	PF	PA	PD	Pts
1	Sydney Roosters	24	19	0	5	2	710	368	+342	42
2	Canterbury-Bankstown Bulldogs (P)	24	19	0	5	2	760	491	+269	42
3	Brisbane Broncos	24	16	1	7	2	602	533	+69	37
4	Penrith Panthers	24	15	0	9	2	672	567	+105	34
5	St George Illawarra Dragons	24	14	0	10	2	624	415	+209	32
6	Melbourne Storm	24	13	0	11	2	684	517	+167	30
7	North Queensland Cowboys	24	12	1	11	2	526	514	+12	29
8	Canberra Raiders	24	11	0	13	2	554	613	−59	26
9	Wests Tigers	24	10	0	14	2	509	534	−25	24
10	Newcastle Knights	24	10	0	14	2	516	617	−101	24
11	Cronulla-Sutherland Sharks	24	10	0	14	2	528	645	−117	24
12	Parramatta Eels	24	9	0	15	2	517	626	−109	22
13	Manly-Warringah Sea Eagles	24	9	0	15	2	615	754	−139	22
14	New Zealand Warriors	24	6	0	18	2	427	693	−266	16
15	South Sydney Rabbitohs	24	5	2	17	2	455	812	−357	16

=== Ladder Progression ===
- Numbers highlighted in green indicate that the team finished the round inside the top 8.
- Numbers highlighted in blue indicates the team finished first on the ladder in that round.
- Numbers highlighted in red indicates the team finished last place on the ladder in that round.
- Underlined numbers indicate that the team had a bye during that round.

	Team	1	2	3	4	5	6	7	8	9	10	11	12	13	14	15	16	17	18	19	20	21	22	23	24	25	26
1	Sydney	2	4	6	6	6	8	10	12	14	16	18	20	20	22	24	26	28	28	30	32	34	34	36	38	40	42
2	Bulldogs	2	4	4	6	8	10	12	14	14	16	16	16	18	20	22	24	26	28	30	32	34	36	38	38	40	42
3	Brisbane	2	2	4	6	8	10	12	12	14	14	16	18	18	20	22	22	24	26	28	30	32	34	34	36	37	37
4	Penrith	0	2	4	6	8	8	8	10	12	14	16	18	18	18	20	22	22	22	24	26	26	28	28	30	32	34
5	St. George-Illawarra	0	2	2	4	6	8	8	10	10	10	12	12	12	14	16	18	20	20	20	22	22	24	26	28	30	32
6	Melbourne	2	2	4	4	4	6	8	8	8	10	12	14	16	16	18	20	22	22	22	24	24	24	26	28	30	30
7	North Queensland	0	2	2	2	4	4	4	6	8	9	9	11	13	15	17	17	17	17	19	21	23	23	25	25	27	29
8	Canberra	2	2	4	6	8	8	10	10	10	10	10	12	12	14	14	16	18	20	20	22	22	22	22	22	24	26
9	Wests	2	2	2	4	4	6	8	8	8	10	12	14	14	16	16	16	16	16	18	18	20	22	24	24	24	24
10	Newcastle	2	4	4	4	6	6	6	8	10	12	14	14	14	14	14	16	16	18	18	18	20	22	22	22	22	24
11	Cronulla-Sutherland	0	0	2	2	2	4	6	6	8	8	10	12	14	14	14	16	18	20	20	20	20	22	22	24	24	24
12	Parramatta	0	2	4	4	6	8	8	8	10	10	10	10	12	14	14	14	14	16	16	16	16	18	20	22	22	22
13	Manly-Warringah	2	2	2	2	2	2	2	4	6	8	8	8	10	10	10	10	10	12	14	14	16	16	18	20	20	22
14	New Zealand	0	0	0	2	2	2	4	6	6	6	8	8	10	10	10	10	12	12	14	14	16	16	16	16	16	16
15	South Sydney	0	2	4	6	6	6	6	6	6	7	7	7	9	11	13	13	13	15	15	15	15	15	15	15	16	16

== Finals series ==
To decide the grand finalists from the top eight finishing teams, the NRL adopts the McIntyre final eight system.

The North Queensland Cowboys qualified for the finals for the first time in their ten-year history, and shocked everybody by finishing just one game short of the grand final. During the finals, they won their first ever game against Queensland rivals Brisbane, thus ending the career of Brisbane stalwart Gorden Tallis. Also retiring after the 2004 finals series were Brad Fittler, Ryan Girdler and Kevin Campion.

St. George Illawarra Dragons almost capped a remarkable comeback when they trailed 24–0 only after half an hour of play to come back to only lose 31–30 against the Penrith Panthers in the first Qualifying Final. In doing so St. George Illawarra became the first team to finish fifth to bow out after the first week of the finals, giving Penrith a home preliminary final; despite leading 8–4 at halftime in their preliminary final against Canterbury, they lost 30–14, thus ending their premiership defence.

Another notable game was the seventh-placed North Queensland Cowboys reaching the finals for the first time and upsetting the second-placed and competition favourites the Canterbury-Bankstown Bulldogs 30–22 in the 3rd qualifying final. North Queensland also defeated the Brisbane Broncos for the first time ever during the semi-finals but were unable to reach the grand final when they lost to the Sydney Roosters in the Preliminary Final.

The North Queensland vs Brisbane semi-final was originally fixtured to be played at Aussie Stadium, however, at the behest of both clubs, and in accordance with Aussie Stadium management, the NRL agreed to move the game to Dairy Farmers Stadium in Townsville. North Queensland won the game 10–0, giving them their first ever win over Brisbane and eliminating from the finals in the process. The game was Broncos' captain and club legend Gorden Tallis' last, who coincidentally was born and raised in Townsville.

The Canterbury-Bankstown Bulldogs claimed their 8th premiership title by beating the Sydney Roosters in the grand final.

Home	Score	Away	Match Information
Home	Score	Away	Date and Time	Venue	Referee	Crowd
Qualifying Finals
Penrith Panthers	31 – 30	St. George Illawarra Dragons	10 September 2004	Penrith Football Stadium	Sean Hampstead	21,963
Brisbane Broncos	14 – 31	Melbourne Storm	11 September 2004	Suncorp Stadium	Steve Clark	31,100
Canterbury-Bankstown Bulldogs	22 – 30	North Queensland Cowboys	11 September 2004	Telstra Stadium	Tim Mander	18,371
Sydney Roosters	38 – 12	Canberra Raiders	12 September 2004	Aussie Stadium	Paul Simpkins	18,375
Semi-finals
North Queensland Cowboys	10 – 0	Brisbane Broncos	18 September 2004	Dairy Farmers Stadium¹	Tim Mander	24,989
Canterbury-Bankstown Bulldogs	43 – 18	Melbourne Storm	19 September 2004	Aussie Stadium	Paul Simpkins	23,750
Preliminary Finals
Penrith Panthers	14 – 30	Canterbury-Bankstown Bulldogs	25 September 2004	Aussie Stadium	Tim Mander	37,868
Sydney Roosters	19 – 16	North Queensland Cowboys	26 September 2004	Telstra Stadium	Paul Simpkins	43,048

¹ Game relocated to Dairy Farmers Stadium, the Cowboys' home ground, from Aussie Stadium. Cowboys designated home team despite the Broncos finishing higher on the table.

=== Finals Chart ===
Qualifying finals
1	Sydney	38
8	Canberra	12
2	Canterbury	22
7	North Queensland	30
3	Brisbane	14
6	Melbourne	31
4	Penrith	31
5	St. George Illawarra	30

Semifinals
4W	North Queensland	10
2L	Brisbane	0
3W	Melbourne	18
1L	Canterbury	43

Preliminary finals
1W	Sydney	19
North Queensland	16
2W	Penrith	14
Canterbury	30

Final
Sydney	13
Canterbury	16

== Grand Final ==
2004 NRL Grand Final

Sunday, 3 October
19:00 AEST (UTC+10)

Sydney Roosters	13 – 16	Canterbury-Bankstown Bulldogs
Tries: 2 Walker 14'; Minichiello 35'; Goals: 2 Fitzgibbon 15', 36' (2/2); Field goals: 1 Finch 34'	1st: 13–6; 2nd: 0–10; Report	Tries: 3 Utai 23', 44'; El Masri 53'; Goals: 2 El Masri pen 29', 45' (2/4)

Telstra Stadium, Sydney
Attendance: 82,127
Referee: Tim Mander
Touch judges: Steve Chiddy, Matt Cecchin
Clive Churchill Medal: Willie Mason (Canterbury)

== Player statistics ==
The following statistics are as of the conclusion of Round 26.

Top 5 point scorers

Points	Player	Tries	Goals	Field Goals
288	Hazem El Masri	11	122	0
208	Josh Hannay	8	88	0
192	Brett Hodgson	11	74	0
180	Andrew Walker	5	80	0
162	Michael De Vere	8	65	0

Top 5 try scorers

Tries	Player
23	Amos Roberts
18	Scott Donald
17	Ryan Cross
17	Matt Cooper
16	Willie Tonga

Top 5 goal scorers

Goals	Player
122	Hazem El Masri
88	Josh Hannay
80	Andrew Walker
74	Brett Hodgson
65	Michael De Vere

== 2004 Transfers ==
=== Players ===
Player	2003 Club	2004 Club
Andrew Gee	Brisbane Broncos	Retirement
Scott Prince	Brisbane Broncos	Wests Tigers
Richard Swain	Brisbane Broncos	Super League: Hull F.C.
Rod Jensen	Canberra Raiders	North Queensland Cowboys
Jamahl Lolesi	Canberra Raiders	Canterbury-Bankstown Bulldogs
Michael Monaghan	Canberra Raiders	Manly Warringah Sea Eagles
Sean Rutgerson	Canberra Raiders	Super League: Salford City Reds
Shane Marteene	Canterbury-Bankstown Bulldogs	South Sydney Rabbitohs
Travis Norton	Canterbury-Bankstown Bulldogs	North Queensland Cowboys
Steve Reardon	Canterbury-Bankstown Bulldogs	Retirement
Nigel Vagana	Canterbury-Bankstown Bulldogs	Cronulla-Sutherland Sharks
Aaron Cannings	Manly Warringah Sea Eagles	Parramatta Eels
Luke Dorn	Manly Warringah Sea Eagles	Sydney Roosters
Tony Jensen	Manly Warringah Sea Eagles	St. George Illawarra Dragons
Danny Lima	Manly Warringah Sea Eagles	Super League: Warrington Wolves
Nathan Long	Manly Warringah Sea Eagles	St. George Illawarra Dragons
Ben MacDougall	Manly Warringah Sea Eagles	Melbourne Storm
Kevin McGuinness	Manly Warringah Sea Eagles	Super League: Salford City Reds
Mark Shipway	Manly Warringah Sea Eagles	Super League: Salford City Reds
Marcus Bai	Melbourne Storm	Super League: Leeds Rhinos
Junior Langi	Melbourne Storm	Parramatta Eels
Aaron Moule	Melbourne Storm	Super League: Widnes Vikings
Robbie Ross	Melbourne Storm	Retirement
Mitchell Sargent	Melbourne Storm	North Queensland Cowboys
Adam MacDougall	Newcastle Knights	South Sydney Rabbitohs
Tim Maddison	Newcastle Knights	Retirement
Sean Rudder	Newcastle Knights	Super League: Castleford Tigers
John Carlaw	New Zealand Warriors	St. George Illawarra Dragons
Ali Lauiti'iti	New Zealand Warriors	Super League: Leeds Rhinos
Logan Swann	New Zealand Warriors	Super League: Bradford Bulls
John Buttigieg	North Queensland Cowboys	Retirement
Paul Dezolt	North Queensland Cowboys	New Zealand Warriors
Paul McNicholas	North Queensland Cowboys	Super League: Hull F.C.
Chris Muckert	North Queensland Cowboys	Parramatta Eels
Shane Muspratt	North Queensland Cowboys	Parramatta Eels
David Thompson	North Queensland Cowboys	South Sydney Rabbitohs
Alex Chan	Parramatta Eels	Melbourne Storm
Shayne Dunley	Parramatta Eels	Manly Warringah Sea Eagles
Paul Green	Parramatta Eels	Brisbane Broncos
Daniel Heckenberg	Parramatta Eels	Manly Warringah Sea Eagles
Brett Hodgson	Parramatta Eels	Wests Tigers
Jason Moodie	Parramatta Eels	Wests Tigers
Pat Richards	Parramatta Eels	Wests Tigers
David Solomona	Parramatta Eels	Super League: Wakefield Trinity Wildcats
Darren Treacy	Parramatta Eels	Retirement
Geoff Bell	Penrith Panthers	Retirement
Shane Elford	Penrith Panthers	Wests Tigers
Chris Hicks	Penrith Panthers	Manly Warringah Sea Eagles
Ben Roarty	Penrith Panthers	Super League: Huddersfield Giants
Scott Sattler	Penrith Panthers	Wests Tigers
Colin Ward	Penrith Panthers	Retirement
Jamie Fitzgerald	South Sydney Rabbitohs	Newcastle Knights
Andrew Hart	South Sydney Rabbitohs	Super League: London Broncos
Duncan MacGillivray	South Sydney Rabbitohs	Super League: Wakefield Trinity Wildcats
Wade McKinnon	South Sydney Rabbitohs	Parramatta Eels
Frank Puletua	South Sydney Rabbitohs	Penrith Panthers
Russell Richardson	South Sydney Rabbitohs	Newcastle Knights
John Cross	St. George Illawarra Dragons	Retirement
Chris Leikvoll	St. George Illawarra Dragons	Super League: Warrington Wolves
Amos Roberts	St. George Illawarra Dragons	Penrith Panthers
Hassan Saleh	St. George Illawarra Dragons	Cronulla-Sutherland Sharks
Craig Stapleton	St. George Illawarra Dragons	Parramatta Eels
Eric Grothe Jr.	Sydney Roosters	Parramatta Eels
Andrew Lomu	Sydney Roosters	Cronulla-Sutherland Sharks
Todd Payten	Sydney Roosters	Wests Tigers
Robbie Beckett	Wests Tigers	Retirement
Nick Bradley-Qalilawa	Wests Tigers	Manly Warringah Sea Eagles
Terry Hill	Wests Tigers	N/A
Willie Manu	Wests Tigers	South Sydney Rabbitohs
Luke O'Donnell	Wests Tigers	North Queensland Cowboys
Corey Pearson	Wests Tigers	Parramatta Eels
Steve Trindall	Wests Tigers	Super League: London Broncos
Lincoln Withers	Wests Tigers	St. George Illawarra Dragons
Mark Lennon	Super League: Castleford Tigers	Manly Warringah Sea Eagles
Andrew Frew	Super League: Halifax	St. George Illawarra Dragons
Scott Logan	Super League: Hull F.C.	South Sydney Rabbitohs
Tony Martin	Super League: London Broncos	New Zealand Warriors
Chris Thorman	Super League: London Broncos	Parramatta Eels
Darren Smith	Super League: St. Helens	Brisbane Broncos
Nick Graham	Super League: Wigan Warriors	Wests Tigers
Andrew Walker	ACT Brumbies (Super 12)	Manly Warringah Sea Eagles
