= 2004 New Zealand Warriors season =

- NRL rank: 14th
- 2004 record: Wins: 6; draws: 0; losses: 18
- Points scored: For: 427; against: 693

Team information
- CEO: Mick Watson
- Coach: Daniel Anderson (11); Tony Kemp (13)
- Assistant coach: Tony Kemp
- Captains: Monty Betham; Awen Guttenbeil Stacey Jones
- Stadium: Ericsson Stadium
- Avg. attendance: 10,171

Top scorers
- Tries: Francis Meli (10)
- Goals: Sione Faumuina (32)
- Points: Sione Faumuina (68)
← 2003	2005 →

The 2004 New Zealand Warriors season was the 10th in the club's history. The club competed in Australasia's National Rugby League. The coach of the team was Daniel Anderson while Monty Betham was the club captain. Daniel Anderson resigned in June and was replaced by assistant coach Tony Kemp.

== Milestones ==
- 8 May - Round 9: Stacey Jones makes his 200th first-grade appearance in New Zealand's 16–8 loss against the North Queensland Cowboys at Dairy Farmers Stadium.
- 30 May - Round 12: Brent Webb played in his 50th match for the club.
- 6 June - Round 13: Iafeta Paleaaesina played in his 50th match for the club.
- 18 July - Round 19: Vinnie Anderson played in his 50th match for the club.
- 14 August - Round 23: Lance Hohaia played in his 50th match for the club.
- 29 August - Round 25: Sione Faumuina played in his 50th match for the club.

== Jersey and sponsors ==

The Warriors made no changes to their jersey design for the 2004 season.

== Fixtures ==
The Warriors used Ericsson Stadium as their home ground in 2004, their only home ground since they entered the competition in 1995.

=== Pre-season Trials ===
The Warriors played the St. George Illawarra Dragons in Hamilton.

=== Regular season ===
Date	Round	Opponent	Venue	Result	Score	Tries	Goals	Attendance	Report
14 March	Round 1	Brisbane Broncos	Suncorp Stadium, Brisbane	Lost	20-28	Webb (2), Leuluai, Meli	Martin (2)	28,548	
20 March	Round 2	St. George Illawarra Dragons	Mt Smart Stadium, Auckland	Lost	10-16	Fa'afili, Meli	Martin (1)	16,425	
28 March	Round 3	Penrith Panthers	Mt Smart Stadium, Auckland	Lost	22-42	L.Anderson, Guttenbeil, Latu, Paleaaesina	Faumuina (3)	15,781	
4 April	Round 4	Manly Sea Eagles	Brookvale Oval, Sydney	Win	28-10	Lauaki (2), Webb (2), Lauitiiti	Faumuina (4)	8,722	
10 April	Round 5	Newcastle Knights	Mt Smart Stadium, Auckland	Lost	20-34	Martin, Murphy, Seuseu	Faumuina (4)	14,409	
16 April	Round 6	Canterbury Bulldogs	Westpac Stadium, Wellington	Lost	18-24	V.Anderson, Jones, Lauaki	Faumuina (3)	13,772	
	Round 7	Bye							
2 May	Round 8	Melbourne Storm	Mt Smart Stadium, Auckland	Win	20-14	Faumuina, Lauaki, Villsanti	Faumuina (4)	9,637	
8 May	Round 9	North Queensland Cowboys	Dairy Farmers Stadium, Townsville	Lost	8-16	V.Anderson	Faumuina (2)	13,062	
16 May	Round 10	Manly Sea Eagles	Mt Smart Stadium, Auckland	Lost	20-42	Jones (2), Meli	Faumuina (4)	10,099	
23 May	Round 11	South Sydney Rabbitohs	Sydney Football Stadium, Sydney	Win	26-12	V.Anderson (2), Meli (2), Jones	Faumuina (3)	8,032	
30 May	Round 12	Sydney Roosters	Sydney Football Stadium, Sydney	Lost	6-58	Paleaaesina	Faumuina (1)	10,078	
6 June	Round 13	Canberra Raiders	Mt Smart Stadium, Auckland	Win	20-14	V.Anderson, Hohaia, Meli, Villasanti	Faumuina (2)	6,967	
13 June	Round 14	Wests Tigers	AMI Stadium, Christchurch	Lost	4-50	Tookey		16,221	
20 June	Round 15	North Queensland Cowboys	Mt Smart Stadium, Auckland	Lost	26-28 (a.e.t)	Toopi (2), V.Anderson, Fa'afili, Tuimavave, Villasanti	Webb (1)	6,793	
26 June	Round 16	Melbourne Storm	Olympic Park Stadium, Melbourne	Lost	6-42	Martin	Hohaia (1)	10,621	
3 July	Round 17	Parramatta Eels	Mt Smart Stadium, Auckland	Win	20-10	Jones, Ropati, Toopi	Martin (4)	6,391	
10 July	Round 18	Cronulla Sharks	Toyota Park, Sydney	Lost	14-22	L.Anderson, Betham, Koopu	Faumuina (1)	7,017	
18 July	Round 19	South Sydney Rabbitohs	Mt Smart Stadium, Auckland	Win	34-20	Webb (2), L.Anderson, Fa'afili, Koopu, Meli, Ropati	Jones (2), Faumuina (1)	7,894	
25 July	Round 20	Canberra Raiders	Bruce Stadium, Canberra	Lost	29-30 (a.e.t)	Jones, Meli, Paleaaesina, Ropati, Webb	Jones (4 & FG)	8,535	
	Round 21	Bye							
7 August	Round 22	Brisbane Broncos	Mt Smart Stadium, Auckland	Lost	14-21	Meli, Villasanti	Jones (2)	9,710	
14 August	Round 23	St. George Illawarra Dragons	WIN Stadium, Wollongong	Lost	10-28	Meli, Webb	Jones (1)	12,520	
21 August	Round 24	Parramatta Eels	Parramatta Stadium, Sydney	Lost	18-48	Hohaia, Martin, Villasanti	Faumuina (3)	7,271	
29 August	Round 25	Sydney Roosters	Mt Smart Stadium, Auckland	Lost	24-30	Guttenbeil, Ropati, Temata, Vuna	Jones (4)	8,019	
5 September	Round 26	Canterbury Bulldogs	Mt Smart Stadium, Auckland	Lost	10-54	Martin (2)	Jones (1)	9,930	

== Ladder ==
2004 NRL season
Pos	Team	Pld	W	D	L	B	PF	PA	PD	Pts
1	Sydney Roosters	24	19	0	5	2	710	368	+342	42
2	Canterbury-Bankstown Bulldogs (P)	24	19	0	5	2	760	491	+269	42
3	Brisbane Broncos	24	16	1	7	2	602	533	+69	37
4	Penrith Panthers	24	15	0	9	2	672	567	+105	34
5	St George Illawarra Dragons	24	14	0	10	2	624	415	+209	32
6	Melbourne Storm	24	13	0	11	2	684	517	+167	30
7	North Queensland Cowboys	24	12	1	11	2	526	514	+12	29
8	Canberra Raiders	24	11	0	13	2	554	613	−59	26
9	Wests Tigers	24	10	0	14	2	509	534	−25	24
10	Newcastle Knights	24	10	0	14	2	516	617	−101	24
11	Cronulla-Sutherland Sharks	24	10	0	14	2	528	645	−117	24
12	Parramatta Eels	24	9	0	15	2	517	626	−109	22
13	Manly-Warringah Sea Eagles	24	9	0	15	2	615	754	−139	22
14	New Zealand Warriors	24	6	0	18	2	427	693	−266	16
15	South Sydney Rabbitohs	24	5	2	17	2	455	812	−357	16

== Squad ==
Thirty five players were used by the Warriors in 2004, including seven players who made their first grade debuts. In addition PJ Marsh was in the squad but did not play a game due to a serious injury.

No.	Name	Nationality	Position	Warriors debut	App	T	G	FG	Pts
24	Stacey Jones	(New Zealand)	HB	23 April 1995	23	6	15	1	55
33	Awen Guttenbeil	(New Zealand) / (Tonga)	SR	14 April 1996	21	2	0	0	8
50	Jerry Seu Seu	(New Zealand) / (Samoa)	PR	16 August 1997	11	1	0	0	4
55	Ali Lauitiiti	(New Zealand) / (Samoa)	SR	19 April 1998	5	1	0	0	4
61	Monty Betham	(New Zealand) / (Samoa)	HK / LK	8 March 1999	13	1	0	0	4
64	Wairangi Koopu	(New Zealand)	CE / SR	9 April 1999	21	2	0	0	8
65	Francis Meli	(New Zealand) / (Samoa)	WG	2 May 1999	16	10	0	0	40
66	Clinton Toopi	(New Zealand)	CE	2 May 1999	18	3	0	0	12
76	Mark Tookey	(Australia)	PR	6 February 2000	5	0	0	0	4
81	Henry Fa'afili	(New Zealand) / (Samoa)	WG	26 March 2000	13	3	0	0	12
87	Richard Villasanti	(Australia) / (Tonga)	PR	18 February 2001	19	5	0	0	20
92	Justin Murphy	(France)	WG	7 April 2001	8	1	0	0	4
93	Iafeta Paleaaesina	(New Zealand) / (Samoa)	PR	1 June 2001	21	3	0	0	12
96	PJ Marsh	(Australia)	HB / HK	24 March 2002	0	0	0	0	0
97	Brent Webb	(New Zealand)	FB	1 April 2002	23	8	1	0	34
98	Sione Faumuina	(New Zealand)	CE / LK	1 April 2002	19	1	32	0	68
99	Lance Hohaia	(New Zealand)	UB	6 April 2002	17	2	4	0	16
100	Vinnie Anderson	(New Zealand) / (Tonga)	CE	7 July 2002	22	6	0	0	24
102	Evarn Tuimavave	(New Zealand)	PR	1 September 2002	13	1	0	0	4
103	Karl Temata	(Cook Islands)	PR / SR	6 September 2002	21	1	0	0	4
105	Thomas Leuluai	(New Zealand)	HB	2 May 2003	9	1	0	0	4
106	Vince Mellars	(New Zealand)	CE	7 June 2003	3	0	0	0	0
107	Tevita Latu	(New Zealand) / (Tonga)	HK	7 June 2003	7	1	0	0	4
108	Jerome Ropati	(New Zealand)	CE / FE	31 August 2003	11	4	0	0	16
109	Tony Martin	(Australia)	CE	14 March 2004	18	5	7	0	34
110	Epalahame Lauaki	(New Zealand) / (Tonga)	SR	14 March 2004	16	4	0	0	16
111	Danny Sullivan	(Australia)	SR	28 March 2004	1	0	0	0	0
112	Louis Anderson	(New Zealand) / (Tonga)	LK	28 March 2004	16	3	0	0	12
113	Matt Jobson	(Australia)	PR	4 April 2004	2	0	0	0	0
114	Paul Dezolt	(Italy)	HK	8 May 2004	3	0	0	0	0
115	Manu Vatuvei	(New Zealand)	WG	23 May 2004	5	0	0	0	0
116	Shannon Stowers	(New Zealand)	PR	20 June 2004	2	0	0	0	0
117	Herewini Rangi	(New Zealand)	HK	25 July 2004	1	0	0	0	0
118	Cooper Vuna	(New Zealand) / (Tonga)	WG	21 August 2004	2	1	0	0	4
119	Kane Ferris	(New Zealand)	PR	29 August 2004	1	0	0	0	0
120	Paul Atkins	(New Zealand)	WG	29 August 2004	1	0	0	0	0

== Staff ==
- Chief executive officer: Mick Watson

=== Coaching staff ===
- Head coach: Daniel Anderson (until June, replaced by Tony Kemp)
- Assistant coach: Tony Kemp
- Assistant coach: Rohan Smith (left in June, joining the London Broncos)

== Transfers ==
=== Gains ===
Player	Previous club	Length	Notes
Tony Martin	London Broncos		
Danny Sullivan	Parramatta Eels		
Matt Jobson	Newcastle Knights		
Paul Dezolt	North Queensland Cowboys		

=== Losses ===
Player	Club	Notes
Mark Robinson	Northampton Saints (RU)	
John Carlaw	St George Illawarra Dragons	
Motu Tony	Brisbane Broncos	
Logan Swann	Bradford Bulls	

==== Mid-Season Losses ====
Player	Club	Notes
Ali Lauitiiti	Leeds Rhinos	Released in April
Paul Dezolt	Queensland Cup	Released 14 June
Mark Tookey	Castleford Tigers	Released in June
Justin Murphy	Widnes Vikings	Released in July

== Other teams ==
Players not required by the Warriors were released to play in the 2004 Bartercard Cup. These included Iafeta Paleaaesina, who played for the Hibiscus Coast Raiders, Brent Webb, who played for the North Harbour Tigers, Evarn Tuimavave, who played with the Marist-Richmond Brothers, Lance Hohaia, who played with the Waicoa Bay Stallions and the Eastern Tornadoes' Justin Murphy.

== Awards ==
Wairangi Koopu won the Player of the Year award.
