= 2004 Cronulla-Sutherland Sharks season =

- NRL rank: 11th
- 2004 record: Wins: 10; draws: 0; losses: 14
- Points scored: For: 528 (96 tries, 72 goals); against: 645 (117 tries, 88 goals, 1 field goal)

Team information
- Coach: Stuart Raper
- Captain: David Peachey Brett Kimmorley
- Stadium: Toyota Park
- Avg. attendance: 12,489

Top scorers
- Tries: Nigel Vagana (12)
- Goals: Brett Kimmorley (40)
- Points: Brett Kimmorley (92)
| ← 2003 | 2005 → |

The 2004 Cronulla-Sutherland Sharks season was the 38th in the club's history. They competed in the NRL's 2004 Telstra Premiership.

== Season summary ==
In the off-season the Sharks signed Stuart Raper as their head coach following the previous season's dismissal of Chris Anderson.

Cronulla did not begin the 2004 season well, losing four or five matches on the trot to be sitting last on the ladder after round five. One early season lowlight was the on-field dismissal of Greg Bird for kneeing Souths' winger Shane Marteene and his subsequent 10-week ban. However, there were some on-field highlights none more so than their round 22 upset of the high-flying Sydney Roosters who were sitting on top of the ladder at the time. They also defeated the likes of the Parramatta Eels at Parramatta Stadium where on their last visit the Sharks were thrashed 74-4 (in fact, Cronulla did not lose again at the venue until 2011), the Melbourne Storm in Melbourne, the Manly-Warringah Sea Eagles at Brookvale Oval where the Sharks historically have a poor record and the Brisbane Broncos in Brisbane. Otherwise, the season was overall a disappointment; the Sharks missing the finals for the second year in succession however they did improve on their disastrous 12th finish in 2003.

== Squad Movement ==
=== 2004 Gains ===
| Player | Signed from |
|---|---|
| Andrew Lomu | Sydney Roosters |
| Ryan McGoldrick | NSW Waratahs |
| Vince Mellars | New Zealand Warriors (mid-season) |
| Nathan Merritt | South Sydney Rabbitohs |
| Michael Russo | Melbourne Storm |
| Hassan Saleh | St George Illawarra Dragons |
| Matt Seers | Free Agent |
| Nigel Vagana | Canterbury Bulldogs |

=== 2004 Losses ===
| Player | Signed from |
|---|---|
| Jarrad Anderson | Canterbury Bulldogs |
| Laloa Milford | Aviron Bayonnais |
| Jye Mullane | Manly Sea Eagles |
| Nick Paterson | Manly Sea Eagles |
| Shaun Wessell | Dapto Canaries |
| Nick Youngquest | St George Illawarra Dragons |

== Ladder ==
2004 NRL season
| Pos | Team | Pld | W | D | L | B | PF | PA | PD | Pts |
|---|---|---|---|---|---|---|---|---|---|---|
| 1 | Sydney Roosters | 24 | 19 | 0 | 5 | 2 | 710 | 368 | +342 | 42 |
| 2 | Canterbury-Bankstown Bulldogs (P) | 24 | 19 | 0 | 5 | 2 | 760 | 491 | +269 | 42 |
| 3 | Brisbane Broncos | 24 | 16 | 1 | 7 | 2 | 602 | 533 | +69 | 37 |
| 4 | Penrith Panthers | 24 | 15 | 0 | 9 | 2 | 672 | 567 | +105 | 34 |
| 5 | St George Illawarra Dragons | 24 | 14 | 0 | 10 | 2 | 624 | 415 | +209 | 32 |
| 6 | Melbourne Storm | 24 | 13 | 0 | 11 | 2 | 684 | 517 | +167 | 30 |
| 7 | North Queensland Cowboys | 24 | 12 | 1 | 11 | 2 | 526 | 514 | +12 | 29 |
| 8 | Canberra Raiders | 24 | 11 | 0 | 13 | 2 | 554 | 613 | −59 | 26 |
| 9 | Wests Tigers | 24 | 10 | 0 | 14 | 2 | 509 | 534 | −25 | 24 |
| 10 | Newcastle Knights | 24 | 10 | 0 | 14 | 2 | 516 | 617 | −101 | 24 |
| 11 | Cronulla-Sutherland Sharks | 24 | 10 | 0 | 14 | 2 | 528 | 645 | −117 | 24 |
| 12 | Parramatta Eels | 24 | 9 | 0 | 15 | 2 | 517 | 626 | −109 | 22 |
| 13 | Manly-Warringah Sea Eagles | 24 | 9 | 0 | 15 | 2 | 615 | 754 | −139 | 22 |
| 14 | New Zealand Warriors | 24 | 6 | 0 | 18 | 2 | 427 | 693 | −266 | 16 |
| 15 | South Sydney Rabbitohs | 24 | 5 | 2 | 17 | 2 | 455 | 812 | −357 | 16 |
