= 2004 Parramatta Eels season =

Australia Rugby League Parramatta Eels 2004 season

- NRL Rank: 12th
- Play-off result: DNQ
- World Club Challenge: DNQ
- World Sevens: Runners-up (Lost 7–18 vs Wests Tigers, Grand Final)
- 2004 record: Wins: 9; draws: 0; losses: 15
- Points scored: For: 517; against: 626

Team information
- CEO: Denis Fitzgerald
- Coach: (Australia) Brian Smith
- Captain: (New Zealand) Nathan Cayless
- Stadium: Parramatta Stadium (Capacity: 20,741)
- Avg. attendance: 11,766 (Home); 14,988 (Home & Away)
- Agg. attendance: 141,186 (Home); 359,718 (Home & Away)
- High attendance: 18,128 (12 April vs South Sydney Rabbitohs, Round 5)

Top scorers
- Tries: (United States) Matt Petersen (14)
- Goals: (Australia) Luke Burt (43)
- Points: (Australia) Luke Burt (134)
← 2003	List of seasons	2005 →

The 2004 Parramatta Eels season was the 58th in the club's history. Coached by Brian Smith and captained by Nathan Cayless, they competed in the National Rugby League's 2004 Telstra Premiership.

== Summary ==
The 2004 NRL season was the worst in some time for the Parramatta club. After only managing nine wins in 24 games, the Parramatta side finished 12th and missed out on the Finals for the second year running. The highlight of the season was defeating Manly 52–12 in round 14 of the competition.

== Standings ==
2004 NRL season
Pos	Team	Pld	W	D	L	B	PF	PA	PD	Pts
1	Sydney Roosters	24	19	0	5	2	710	368	+342	42
2	Canterbury-Bankstown Bulldogs (P)	24	19	0	5	2	760	491	+269	42
3	Brisbane Broncos	24	16	1	7	2	602	533	+69	37
4	Penrith Panthers	24	15	0	9	2	672	567	+105	34
5	St George Illawarra Dragons	24	14	0	10	2	624	415	+209	32
6	Melbourne Storm	24	13	0	11	2	684	517	+167	30
7	North Queensland Cowboys	24	12	1	11	2	526	514	+12	29
8	Canberra Raiders	24	11	0	13	2	554	613	−59	26
9	Wests Tigers	24	10	0	14	2	509	534	−25	24
10	Newcastle Knights	24	10	0	14	2	516	617	−101	24
11	Cronulla-Sutherland Sharks	24	10	0	14	2	528	645	−117	24
12	Parramatta Eels	24	9	0	15	2	517	626	−109	22
13	Manly-Warringah Sea Eagles	24	9	0	15	2	615	754	−139	22
14	New Zealand Warriors	24	6	0	18	2	427	693	−266	16
15	South Sydney Rabbitohs	24	5	2	17	2	455	812	−357	16

== Awards ==
- Michael Cronin clubman of the year award: Michael Vella
- Ken Thornett Medal (Players' player): Nathan Hindmarsh
- Jack Gibson Award (Coach's award): Wade McKinnon
- Eric Grothe Rookie of the Year Award: Jack Afamasaga
