= 2004 Brisbane Broncos season =

Coordinates: 27°27′53″S 153°0′34″E

← 2003	2005 →

The 2004 Brisbane Broncos season was the seventeenth in the club's history. The team is based in Brisbane, Queensland, Australia. They competed in the NRL's 2004 Telstra Premiership, making it to the finals again, but were knocked out of contention by the North Queensland Cowboys, their first ever loss to the club.

== Season summary ==
The 2004 NRL season was Darren Lockyer's first in the position of five-eighth and Gorden Tallis' last as captain. The Broncos started the season by defeating the New Zealand Warriors 28-20 in Round 1, only to lose their next match against the Parramatta Eels by 26-18. The Broncos then won their next five matches, including a controversial match against the Tigers, during which the Broncos appeared to field 14 men at one stage of the match. In the 60th minute, Brisbane's Shane Webcke was taken off the ground after being knocked out by Bryce Gibbs; while he was assisted off the field, Corey Parker was brought on, and immediately scored off a Darren Lockyer pass to start a Broncos revival (they trailed 24-8 at halftime) which saw them claim a 32-24 victory. An ensuing investigation saw the Broncos stripped of two competition points, but, following a successful appeal, they were reinstated weeks later.

In round 10, the Broncos and the Newcastle Knights made history by contesting the first ever golden point match on free-to-air television. The Broncos lost the match 16-17 after Newcastle's Kurt Gidley booted a field goal three minutes and 26 seconds into extra time.

The Broncos eventually qualified for the finals for the thirteenth consecutive season after finishing the minor rounds in third place on the ladder (only behind eventual Grand Finalists the Sydney Roosters and the Bulldogs), but would bow out in straight sets, first losing to the Melbourne Storm at home by 31-14 before losing to the North Queensland Cowboys in Townsville, in what was captain Gorden Tallis' final game for the club. It also marked the first time the Broncos had lost to the Cowboys, and the first time the Broncos had been held scoreless anywhere in Queensland. With Tallis' retirement at the end of the season, the Broncos' captaincy was passed onto Darren Lockyer.

== Match results ==
	Opponent	Result	Bro.	Opp.	Date	Venue	Crowd	Position
Trial Match	Melbourne Storm	Win	14	10	21 Feb	Stadium Toowoomba	-	-
Trial Match	Sydney Roosters	Loss	12	34	28 Feb	Dolphin Oval	-	-
Rd. 1	New Zealand Warriors	Win	28	20	14 Mar	Suncorp Stadium	28,548	4/15
Rd. 2	Parramatta Eels	Loss	18	26	21 Mar	Suncorp Stadium	23,550	6/15
Rd. 3	Wests Tigers	Win	32	24	28 Mar	Campbelltown Stadium	13,011	5/15
Rd. 4	Melbourne Storm	Win	34	26	4 Apr	Suncorp Stadium	19,334	3/15
Rd. 5	Sydney Roosters	Win	26	14	9 Apr	Sydney Football Stadium	23,118	2/15
Rd. 6	North Queensland Cowboys	Win	19	12	17 Apr	Dairy Farmers Stadium	25,986	1/15
Rd. 7	Penrith Panthers	Win	32	14	25 Apr	Suncorp Stadium	37,745	1/15
Rd. 8	Bulldogs	Loss	18	25	2 May	Telstra Stadium	17,104	3/15
Rd. 9	Canberra Raiders	Win	34	20	9 May	Canberra Stadium	12,319	2/15
Rd. 10	Newcastle Knights	Loss	16	17	14 May	Suncorp Stadium	32,747	3/15
Rd. 11	Bye	-	-	-	-	-	-	2/15
Rd. 12^	St George Illawarra Dragons	Win	24	22	28 May	Suncorp Stadium	27,589	2/15
Rd. 13	Cronulla-Sutherland Sharks	Loss	22	30	6 Jun	Suncorp Stadium	26,691	3/15
Rd. 14	Bye	-	-	-	-	-	-	3/15
Rd. 15^	Parramatta Eels	Win	34	24	19 Jun	Parramatta Stadium	10,147	2/15
Rd. 16	Canberra Raiders	Loss	14	21	27 Jun	Suncorp Stadium	27,774	4/15
Rd. 17	South Sydney Rabbitohs	Win	48	28	4 Jul	Suncorp Stadium	19,942	3/15
Rd. 18^	St George Illawarra Dragons	Win	28	14	9 Jul	WIN Stadium	15,348	3/15
Rd. 19	Newcastle Knights	Win	16	12	18 Jul	EnergyAustralia Stadium	11,271	3/15
Rd. 20	Manly-Warringah Sea Eagles	Win	26	12	24 Jul	Suncorp Stadium	23,726	3/15
Rd. 21	Cronulla-Sutherland Sharks	Win	16	12	31 Jul	Toyota Park	12,565	3/15
Rd. 22	New Zealand Warriors	Win	21	14	7 Aug	Suncorp Stadium	9,710	3/15
Rd. 23	Bulldogs	Loss	18	46	15 Aug	Suncorp Stadium	49,571	3/15
Rd. 24	Wests Tigers	Win	24	20	21 Aug	Suncorp Stadium	26,790	3/15
Rd. 25	South Sydney Rabbitohs	Draw	34	34	28 Aug	Sydney Football Stadium	7,049	3/15
Rd. 26	Penrith Panthers	Loss	20	46	3 Sep	Penrith Park	20,043	3/15
Qualif. Final	Melbourne Storm	Loss	14	31	11 Sep	Suncorp Stadium	31,100	-
Semi Final	North Queensland Cowboys	Loss	0	10	18 Sep	Dairy Farmers Stadium	24,989	-

^ = Game following a State of Origin match

== Ladder ==
2004 NRL season
Pos	Team	Pld	W	D	L	B	PF	PA	PD	Pts
1	Sydney Roosters	24	19	0	5	2	710	368	+342	42
2	Canterbury-Bankstown Bulldogs (P)	24	19	0	5	2	760	491	+269	42
3	Brisbane Broncos	24	16	1	7	2	602	533	+69	37
4	Penrith Panthers	24	15	0	9	2	672	567	+105	34
5	St George Illawarra Dragons	24	14	0	10	2	624	415	+209	32
6	Melbourne Storm	24	13	0	11	2	684	517	+167	30
7	North Queensland Cowboys	24	12	1	11	2	526	514	+12	29
8	Canberra Raiders	24	11	0	13	2	554	613	−59	26
9	Wests Tigers	24	10	0	14	2	509	534	−25	24
10	Newcastle Knights	24	10	0	14	2	516	617	−101	24
11	Cronulla-Sutherland Sharks	24	10	0	14	2	528	645	−117	24
12	Parramatta Eels	24	9	0	15	2	517	626	−109	22
13	Manly-Warringah Sea Eagles	24	9	0	15	2	615	754	−139	22
14	New Zealand Warriors	24	6	0	18	2	427	693	−266	16
15	South Sydney Rabbitohs	24	5	2	17	2	455	812	−357	16

== Scorers ==
Player	Tries	Goals	FG	Points
Michael De Vere	8	65/82	0	162
Karmichael Hunt	15	0	0	60
Darren Lockyer	2	21/29	1	51
Craig Frawley	10	0	0	40
Corey Parker	3	13/17	0	38
Shaun Berrigan	9	0	0	36
Casey McGuire	5	0	1	21
Tonie Carroll	5	0	0	20
Stuart Kelly	5	0	0	20
Brent Tate	5	0	0	20
Gorden Tallis	5	0	0	20
Barry Berrigan	4	0	0	16
Ben Ikin	4	0	0	16
Carl Webb	4	0	0	16
Neville Costigan	3	0	0	12
Petero Civoniceva	2	0	0	8
Dane Carlaw	2	0	0	8
Brad Meyers	2	0	0	8
David Stagg	2	0	0	8
Darren Smith	2	0	0	8
Gary Tupou	2	0	0	8
Motu Tony	2	0	0	8
Darren Mapp	1	0	0	4
Michael Ryan	1	0	0	4
Shane Webcke	1	0	0	4

== Honours ==
=== League ===
- Nil

=== Club ===
- Player of the year: Petero Civoniceva
- Rookie of the year: Karmichael Hunt
- Back of the year: Shaun Berrigan
- Forward of the year: Petero Civoniceva
- Club man of the year: Gorden Tallis
