= Canterbury-Bankstown Bulldogs Honours =

The Canterbury-Bankstown Bulldogs are a professional rugby league club in the National Rugby League (NRL), the premier rugby league football competition in Australia.

Based in Belmore, a suburb of Sydney, the Bulldogs in 1935 were admitted to the New South Wales Rugby League (NSWRL) competition, a predecessor of the current NRL competition.

The Bulldogs won their first premiership in just their fourth season (1938). At the time it made them the quickest club (barring the founding clubs) to win a premiership after admission to the competition, a record which was only recently beaten in 1999 by the Melbourne Storm. They won a second premiership in 1942 but then had to wait another 38 years before breaking through for a third title in 1980. During the 80s, the Bulldogs were a dominant force in the competition appearing in five Grand Finals, winning four of them. In the 90s they featured in the 1995 and 1998 Grand Finals, winning the former. Their most recent success was in 2004 when they beat the Sydney Roosters 16 - 13. The tryscorers were Hazem El Masri and Matt Utai, and the Clive Churchill Medal winner was Willie Mason.

Their eight premiership trophy moved the club into a clear 5th place in the all-time tally.

== 1ST Grade ==
Premierships (8)

Year	Opponent	Score
1938	Easts	19-6
1942	St. George	11-9
1980	Easts	18-4
1984	Parramatta	6-4
1985	St. George	7-6
1988	Balmain	24-12
1995	Manly	17-4
2004	Sydney	16-13

Runners Up (8)

Year	Opponent	Score
1940	Easts	14-24
1947	Balmain	9-13
1967	Souths	10-12
1974	Easts	4-19
1979	St. George	13-17
1986	Parramatta	2-4
1994	Canberra	12-36
1998	Brisbane	12-38

Minor Premierships (7)

Year	Competition	Wins
1938	NSWRL	11 (2 draws)
1942	NSWRL	10
1947	NSWRL	13 (1 draw)
1984	NSWRL	19
1993	NSWRL	17
1994	NSWRL	18
2012	NSWRL	18

Finals Appearances (40)

Year	Competition	Finishing Position
1936	NSWRL	Semi Finalists
1938	NSWRL	Premiers
1939	NSWRL	Semi Finalists
1940	NSWRL	Runners Up
1941	NSWRL	Semi Finalists
1942	NSWRL	Premiers
1946	NSWRL	Semi Finalists
1947	NSWRL	Runners Up
1960	NSWRL	Semi Finalists
1967	NSWRL	Runners Up
1970	NSWRL	Semi Finalists
1973	NSWRL	Preliminary Semi Finalists
1974	NSWRL	Runners Up
1975	NSWRL	Preliminary Semi Finalists
1976	NSWRL	Preliminary Finalists
1978	NSWRL	Preliminary Semi Finalists
1979	NSWRL	Runners Up
1980	NSWRL	Premiers
1983	NSWRL	Preliminary Finalists
1984	NSWRL	Premiers
1985	NSWRL	Premiers
1986	NSWRL	Runners Up
1988	NSWRL	Premiers
1993	NSWRL	Preliminary Finalists
1994	NSWRL	Runners Up
1995	ARL	Premiers
1997	SL	Preliminary Semi Finalists
1998	NRL	Runners Up
1999	NRL	Semi Finalists
2001	NRL	Semi Finalists
2003	NRL	Preliminary Finalists
2004	NRL	Premiers
2006	NRL	Preliminary Finalists
2007	NRL	Semi Finalists
2009	NRL	Preliminary Finalists
2012	NRL	Runners Up
2013	NRL	Elimination Final
2014	NRL	Runners Up
2015	NRL	Semi Finalists
2016	NRL	Semi Finalists

== 2ND Grade/NSW Cup ==
2ND Grade
Premiers (11)	1939, 1971, 1972, 1980, 1997 (SL), 1998*, 2000, 2002, 2010, 2011, 2018
Runners-Up (3)	1945, 1952, 1979

== 3RD Grade ==
3RD Grade
Premiers (1)	1971
Runners-Up (5)	1963, 1969, 1972, 1974, 1976

== President's Cup ==
President's Cup
Premiers (4)	1931, 1976, 1991, 1998*
Runners-Up (5)	1942, 1968, 1971, 1972, 1975

== Jersey Flegg Cup ==
Jersey Flegg Cup
Premiers (10)	1963, 1971, 1972, 1976, 1979, 1983, 1999, 2000, 2001, 2003
Runners-Up (0)	

== Harold Matthews Cup ==
Harold Matthews Cup
Premiers (3)	2007, 2009, 2011
Runners-Up (1)	2006

== SG Ball Cup ==
S. G. Ball Cup
Premiers (2)	1972, 1978, 2009
Runners-Up (2)	1965, 1966

== Club Championships ==
Club Championships
Club Championships (7)	1938, 1939, 1993, 1994, 2009, 2010, 2011

- The Bulldogs won the President's Cup title in 1998; however this title was also considered to be the equivalent of 2nd Grade and as such is listed in both tables.

== Footnotes ==
- Woods B (2007). El Magic - The Life of Hazem El Masri. HarperCollins Publishing. ISBN 0-7322-8402-3
- Andrews M (2006). The ABC of Rugby League. ABC Publishing. ISBN 0-7333-1946-7
- Whiticker A & Hudson G (2005). Canterbury Bulldogs - The Encyclopedia of Rugby League Players. Bas Publishing. ISBN 1-920910-50-6
- Whittaker A & Collis I (2004). The History of Rugby League Clubs. ISBN 978-1-74110-470-7
- Lane D (1996). A Family Betrayal - One Man's Super League War - Jarred McCracken. Ironbark Publishing. ISBN 0-330-35839-1
- Chesterton R (1996). Good as Gould - Phil Gould's Stormy Life in Football. Ironbark Publishing. ISBN 0-330-35873-1
- Lane D (1996). A Family Betrayal - One Man's Super League War - Jarred McCracken. Ironbark Publishing. ISBN 0-330-35839-1
- Whiticker A (1992). The Terry Lamb Story. Gary Allen Publishing. ISBN 1-875169-14-8
- Tasker N (1988). Top-Dog - The Steve Mortimer Story. Century Hutchinson Publishing. ISBN 0-09-169231-8
- Lester G (1985). Berries to Bulldogs. Lester - Townsend Publishing. ISBN 0-949853-06-2
- NRL Official Information Handbook (2001–2007). Season Guide.
- Middleton D (1987–2006). The Official NSWRL, ARL, NRL Yearbook / Annual.
- Christensen EE (1946–1977). NSWRL Yearbook.
- Rugby League Review (2003-2007).
- Big League (1974-2007).
- Rugby League Week (1970-2007).
- The Rugby League News.
