= Paul Rauhihi =

New Zealand international rugby league footballer

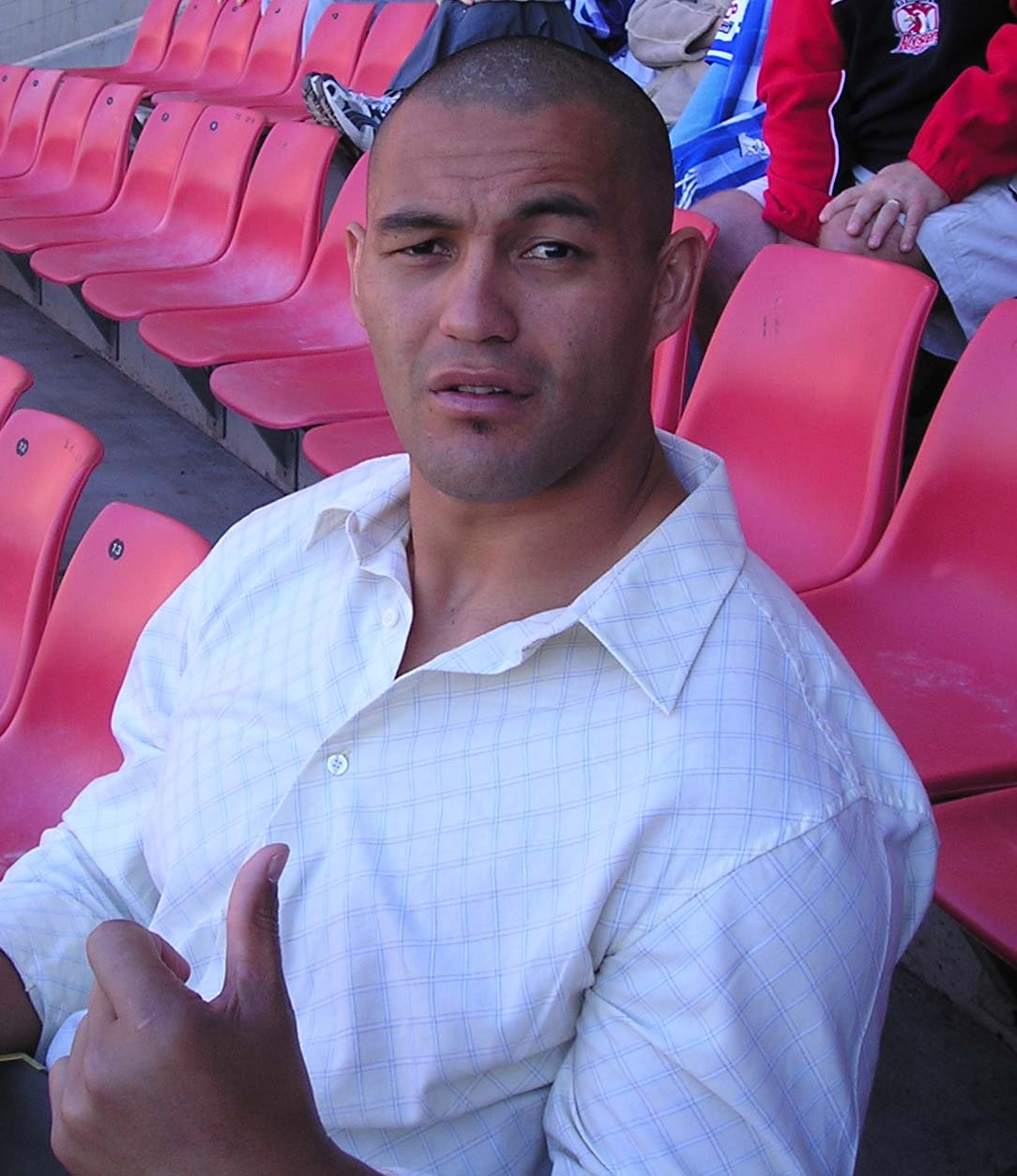

Personal information
- Full name: Paul Maraku Joseph Rauhihi
- Born: 3 July 1973 (age 53) Porirua, New Zealand

Playing information
- Height: 6 ft 3 in (1.91 m)
- Weight: 116 kg (18 st 4 lb)
- Position: Prop
Club
Years	Team	Pld	T	G	FG	P
1999–00	Newcastle Knights	19	3	0	0	12
2001–02	Canterbury Bulldogs	40	2	0	0	8
2003–05	North Qld Cowboys	72	6	1	0	26
2006–09	Warrington Wolves	95	12	0	0	48
	Total	226	23	1	0	94
Representative
Years	Team	Pld	T	G	FG	P
1996–00	New Zealand Māori	3	0	0	0	0
2002–05	New Zealand	17	1	0	0	4

Paul Rauhihi (born 3 July 1973) is a New Zealand former professional rugby league footballer who represented New Zealand. Rauhihi played in both the National Rugby League (NRL) and Super League as a prop.

== Background ==
Rauhihi was born in Porirua, New Zealand. He was an orphan and was adopted early in life.

== Playing career ==
=== New Zealand career ===
Rauhihi's junior clubs were the Cottingham Tigers and St George club in Wellington. He then joined the New Zealand Navy and played for the Northcote Tigers and North Harbour Sea Eagles before becoming an Auckland Warriors junior in 1994.

Rauhihi was part of the Northcote side that won the Fox Memorial in 1994. After leaving the navy to concentrate on his rugby league career, Rauhihi played in 17 reserve grade games for the Warriors in 1996 and was a part of the Reserve Grade side that lost the 1997 grand final.

In 1998, he played for Taranaki before signing with the Melbourne Storm.

=== Australian career ===
Rauhihi was released by Melbourne during the 1999 NRL season to sign with Newcastle Knights. He made his first grade début against Western Suburbs at Energy Australia Stadium on 27 June 1999. The following year, he played in Newcastle's preliminary final loss against the Sydney Roosters.

In 2001, he moved to the Canterbury-Bankstown Bulldogs. In the same year, he played in Canterbury's 52-10 elimination final loss against Cronulla-Sutherland. In the 2002 NRL season, Rauhihi played 23 games for Canterbury in what turned out to be one of the club's most turbulent. After going on a 16-game winning streak, it was discovered by the NRL that Canterbury had exceeded the NRL's salary cap by $2 million over three years including undisclosed payments made to players. As a result, the NRL fined Canterbury $500,000 and stripped them of all their 37 competition points; this meant that the club would finish the 2002 season with the wooden spoon.

Rauhihi then moved to the North Queensland Cowboys, winning the club's player of the year award in 2003. He also captained the side due to regular captain Paul Bowman being out with injury in 2004, and also when Travis Norton was out due to injury in 2005. He played at prop in the 2005 NRL Grand Final, the Cowboys' first, which they lost to the Wests Tigers.

=== English career ===
Rauhihi moved to England after the 2005 grand final loss, joining the Warrington Wolves where he was given the number 10 jersey. In 2009, after a number of seasons plagued by back injury, Rauhihi retired.

== Representative career ==
In 1996 Rauhihi played for the New Zealand Māori side that toured PNG and then competed in the Pacific Challenge Series. In 2000 he was part of the side in the World Cup.

Between 2002 and 2005 he played in seventeen matches for the New Zealand national rugby league team, including captaining the side in the 2004 Tr-nations series due to an injury to Ruben Wiki. He was also part of the 2005 Tri Nations squad that won the competition.

== Match Fit ==
In 2023, Rauhihi participated in season 3 of Match Fit, where former rugby players return to play against the Australian counterparts. He joined in the first season that featured former rugby league stars. On episode 5, he revealed that he was an orphan and was adopted, and he buried his debut Kiwis jersey with his adopted father when he died when Rauhihi was in his 20's. He also revealed that he prefers weights and power training over running.
