= Steve Southern =

Australian former professional rugby league footballer

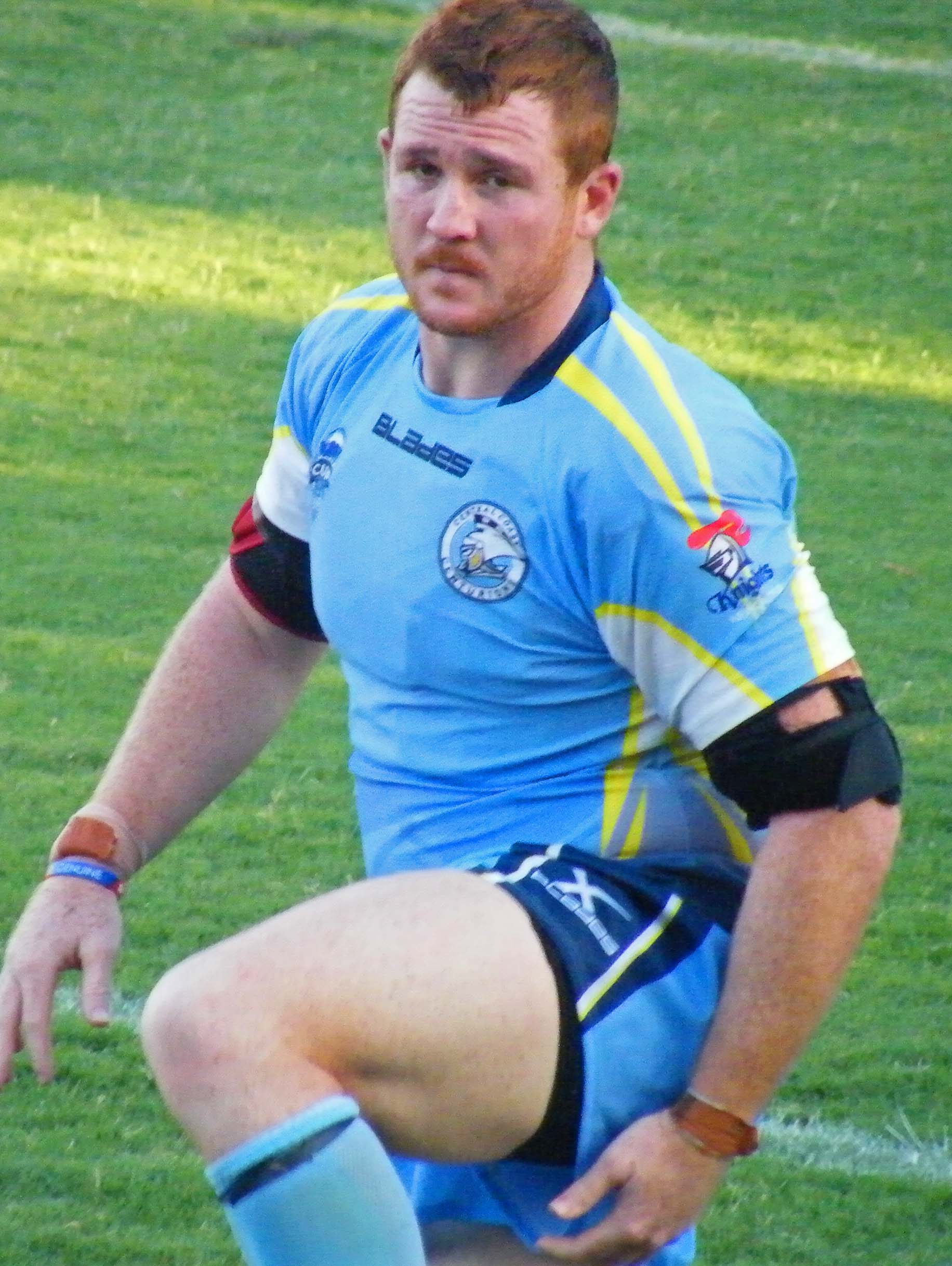

Personal information
- Born: 29 April 1982 (age 43); Wollongong, New South Wales, Australia

Playing information
- Height: 180 cm (5 ft 11 in)
- Weight: 98 kg (15 st 6 lb)
- Position: Second-row, Lock
Club
Years	Team	Pld	T	G	FG	P
2004–10	North Qld Cowboys	130	12	0	0	48
2011	Newcastle Knights	7	0	0	0	0
2012	Wakefield Trinity Wildcats	15	3	0	0	12
	Total	152	15	0	0	60

Steve Southern (born 29 April 1982) is an Australian former professional rugby league footballer who played as a second-row and lock forward in the 2000s and 2010s.

He previously played for the North Queensland Cowboys and Newcastle Knights in the National Rugby League, and the Wakefield Trinity Wildcats (captain) in the Super League.

== Playing career ==
Born in Wollongong, New South Wales, Southern played his junior football for Dapto before being signed by the St. George Illawarra Dragons.

In 2004, Southern signed with the North Queensland Cowboys.

In Round 14 of the 2004 NRL season, Southern made his NRL début for the Cowboys against the Newcastle Knights.

In 2005, Southern played at second-row in the Cowboys' 2005 NRL Grand Final loss to the Wests Tigers.

In September 2010, after playing over 120 games for the Cowboys, Southern signed a 1-year contract with the Newcastle Knights starting in 2011.

In August 2011, Southern signed a 3-year contract with Super League team, Wakefield Trinity Wildcats, in a deal that would see him captain the club.

In October 2012, Southern decided to cut his stint at Wakefield short, and return to Australia.

== Representative career ==
In 1999 and 2000, Southern played for the New South Wales Schoolboys.

In 2000, Southern played for the Australian Schoolboys.
