= Sione Finefeuiaki =

Tongan rugby league footballer

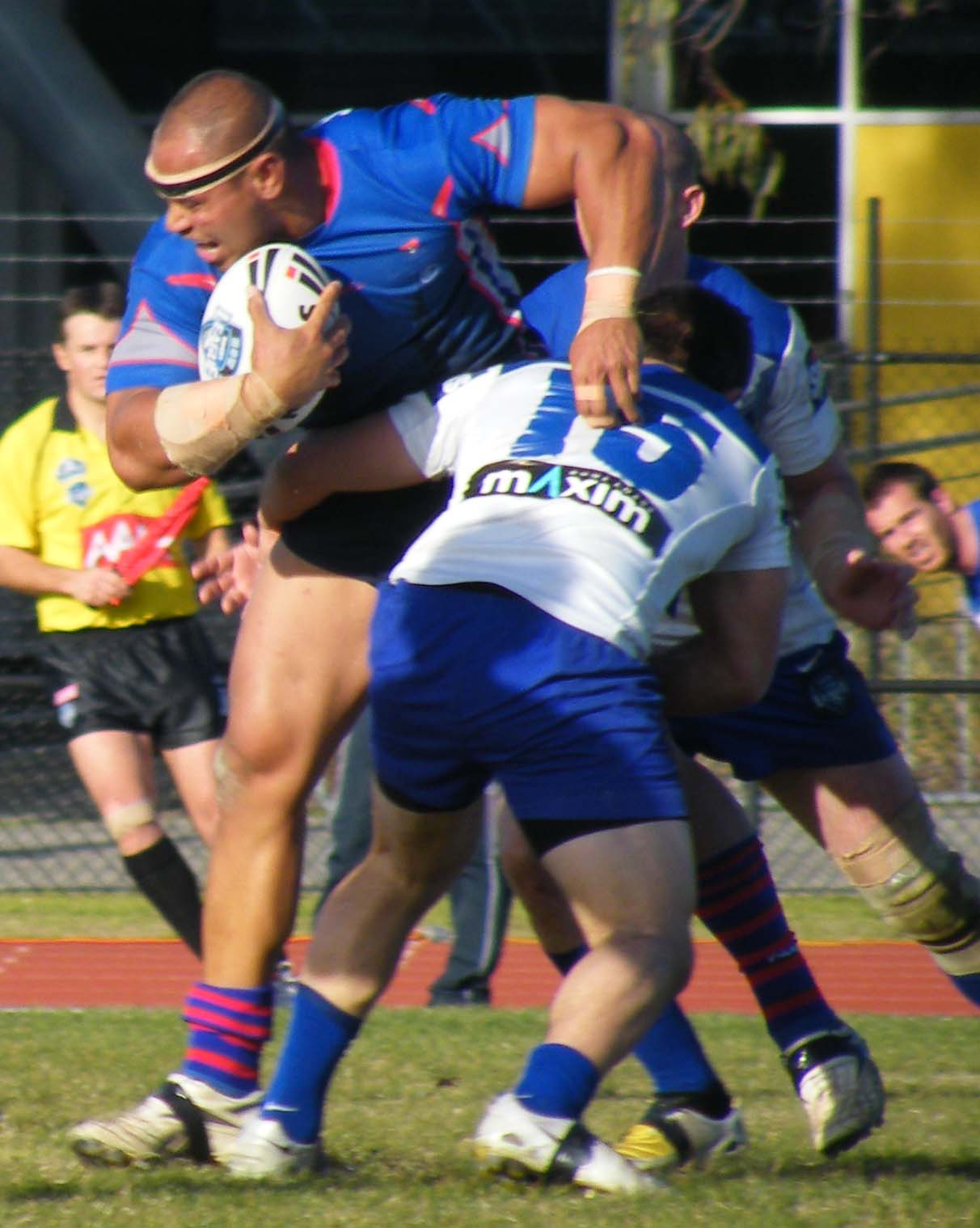
- Finefeuiaki playing for the Newcastle Knights

Personal information
- Full name: Sione Finefeuiaki
- Born: 2 November 1979 (age 45); Tonga

Playing information
- Height: 190 cm (6 ft 3 in)
- Weight: 112 kg (17 st 9 lb)
- Position: Prop
Club
Years	Team	Pld	T	G	FG	P
2007	Manly-Warringah	1	0	0	0	0

Sione Finefeuiaki (born 2 November 1979) is a Tongan former professional rugby league footballer who last played in the Newcastle Rugby League competition, as a prop.

== Background ==
Finefeuiaki was born in Tonga and lived in his native country until the age of 16. Finefeuiaki played rugby union at Liahona High School, as rugby league was not played. After moving to New Zealand, he played rugby union for Otahuhu in 1998, picking up the under 21s player of the year award. Moving to Marist in 1999, he then played rugby league in 2000 for Pakuranga, moving to Hibiscus Coast Raiders in 2001.

== Playing career ==
Finefeuiaki was signed by the Sydney Roosters, playing in reserve grade in 2001. An ankle injury late in 2001 forced him to miss the entire 2002 season.

Returning to New Zealand, Finefeuiaki rejoined the Hibiscus Coast Raiders in the Bartercard Cup competition, where he attracted the attention of Melbourne Storm recruitment manager Peter O'Sullivan who invited him to join Melbourne's pre-season program ahead of the 2004 NRL season. He signed a contract with Melbourne until the end of the 2005 season but failed to make a single appearance for the Storm before joining the Manly-Warringah Sea Eagles.

Finefeuiaki finished third in the South Pacific Body Building Championships during his injury rehabilitation in 2002.
