= Danny Sullivan (rugby league) =

Australian rugby league footballer

Personal information
- Full name: Daniel Sullivan
- Born: 4 January 1982 (age 44)

Playing information
- Position: Second-row
Club
Years	Team	Pld	T	G	FG	P
2001–03	Parramatta Eels	5	0	0	0	0
2004	New Zealand Warriors	1	0	0	0	0
	Total	6	0	0	0	0
- Source: As of 16 December 2008

Danny Sullivan is an Australian former rugby league footballer. His position of preference was in the Second Row.

== Early years ==
Sullivan grew up in Sydney where he attended Westfields Sports High School. In 1999 he toured France, Ireland and England with the Australian schoolboys team. The team was undefeated and Sullivan played alongside Braith Anasta, Mark Gasnier, Brent Tate and Jamie Lyon. As an Australian representative, Sullivan was inducted into the Westfields Sports Hall of Fame and also won a New South Wales Sporting Blue.

== Parramatta Eels ==
Sullivan was a junior at the Parramatta Eels while at Westfields Sports and he made his National Rugby League debut for the club in 2001. He played five games that season, coming off the bench. This was enough to earn the Eric Grothe rookie of the year award as the club's best youngster in 2001.

He had an impressive off season with the club in 2002, and was even talked about as a possible NRL Rookie of the Year award winner for the 2002 season. However he suffered a severe knee injury and required a knee anterior cruciate ligament (ACL) reconstruction. This was later compounded when he developed a Golden staph infection which ruined his next two seasons and haunted him for the rest of his career.

== New Zealand Warriors ==
In 2004 Sullivan joined the New Zealand Warriors, seeking to rebuild his career. At the time the head coach was Daniel Anderson, who had previously coached Sullivan in the youth sides at Parramatta. Sullivan managed to play one game for the Warriors, starting in the second row, before again suffering knee problems. He was later ruled out for the season. When Daniel Anderson was fired and replaced by Tony Kemp midway through the season Sullivan decided to retire and return to Australia.
