= Andrew Lomu =

NZ & Tonga international rugby league footballer

Personal information
- Full name: Andrew Lomu
- Born: 28 February 1979 (age 47) Sydney, New South Wales, Australia

Playing information
- Height: 187 cm (6 ft 2 in)
- Weight: 104 kg (16 st 5 lb)
- Position: Prop
Club
Years	Team	Pld	T	G	FG	P
2000–03	Sydney Roosters	51	2	0	0	8
2004–05	Cronulla-Sutherland	22	1	0	0	4
2005–06	Canberra Raiders	15	0	0	0	0
2007	Brisbane Broncos	1	0	0	0	0
	Total	89	3	0	0	12
Representative
Years	Team	Pld	T	G	FG	P
2000	Tonga	3	0	0	0	0
2002	New Zealand	1	0	0	0	0

Andrew Lomu (born 28 February 1979) is an Australian former professional rugby league footballer. He previously played as a prop for the Sydney Roosters, Cronulla-Sutherland Sharks, Canberra Raiders and for the Brisbane Broncos in the NRL.

== Background ==
Lomu was born in Sydney, New South Wales, Australia.

A distant cousin of New Zealand former rugby union international Jonah Lomu, he is of Tongan descent.

== Playing career ==
He represented Tonga at the 2000 Rugby League World Cup.

He also represented New Zealand against Australia in one game in 2002.

Lomu played for the Roosters from the bench in their 2002 NRL Grand Final victory against the New Zealand Warriors. At the end of the following season he played his last game for the Roosters, coming on from the interchange bench in the 2003 NRL grand final which was lost to the Penrith Panthers. The following season he played for Cronulla-Sutherland.
