= Sione Faumuina =

New Zealand rugby league footballer

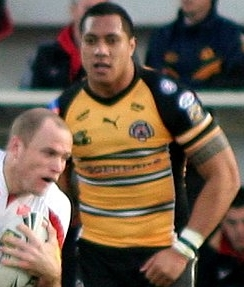

Personal information
- Full name: Sione Vili Faumuina
- Born: 27 March 1981 (age 44) Auckland, New Zealand

Playing information
- Height: 6 ft 3 in (1.91 m)
- Weight: 15 st 12 lb (101 kg)
- Position: Lock, Second-row, Five-eighth, Centre
Club
Years	Team	Pld	T	G	FG	P
2001	Canberra Raiders	11	2	0	0	8
2002–06	New Zealand Warriors	88	18	33	0	138
2005	Hull FC	3	1	0	0	4
2007–08	North Qld Cowboys	33	4	0	0	16
2009	Castleford Tigers	21	2	0	0	8
	Total	156	27	33	0	174
Representative
Years	Team	Pld	T	G	FG	P
2003–04	New Zealand	2	0	4	0	8

Sione Faumuina (born 27 March 1981) is a New Zealand former professional rugby league footballer who last played for the Redcliffe Dolphins in the Queensland Cup. He previously played for the Canberra Raiders, North Queensland Cowboys and New Zealand Warriors in the NRL and for the Castleford Tigers and Hull FC in the Super League.

Faumuina represented New Zealand on two occasions between 2003 and 2004 and his position of choice was second-row, although he also played as a centre, five-eighth or lock.

== Playing career ==
Faumuina made his first grade debut in round 1 of the 2001 NRL season for Canberra against the New Zealand Warriors. Faumuina signed with the New Zealand Warriors in 2002 but did not play in the clubs 2002 NRL Grand Final loss against the Sydney Roosters. He was released by the New Zealand Warriors in August 2006 for repeated involvement in "cases of serious misconduct", related to alcohol. Faumuina was due to play for Super League club the Harlequins RL until the club tore up his contract pre-season. Faumuina later signed with the North Queensland Cowboys and played with them between 2007 and 2008. In 2009, Faumuina signed for English side Castleford. Faumuina was released by mutual consent from Castleford at the back end of the 2009 season. In 2011, Faumuina moved to Tannum Sands to work in local industry. He went on to play five-eighth for Tannum Sands Gullaz.

== Personal life ==
- Faumuina is the former partner of professional netball player Temepara George. He is currently married with three girls.
- On 4 July 2008, Faumuina is involved in a single vehicle accident near the Lavarack Barracks in Townsville where he rolled his car and escaped unscathed. He left the scene and reported to police 10.5 hours later.
- In August 2009, Faumuina was suspended from the Castleford Tigers and returned to Australia.
- In 2023, Faumuina participated in season 3 of Match Fit, where former rugby players return to play against their Australian counterparts. He joined in the first season that featured former rugby league stars. He was the most physically fit-looking member at the start of the season because he already started his physical fitness regime with his wife in January 2022. He started the regime at 133 kg (20 st 13 lb), but started the season with a metabolic age of 26, which is far than he was in his playing days. He was invited to the show to deal with his mental issues and off-field concerns. Through his dedication and hard work, and significantly cutting back on alcohol intake, he was given Captaincy in the final match against Australian Kangaroo alumni.
