= David Thompson (rugby league, born 1978) =

Australian rugby league footballer

Personal information
- Born: 17 March 1978 (age 47); Sydney, New South Wales, Australia
- Height: 193 cm (6 ft 4 in)
- Weight: 109 kg (240 lb; 17 st 2 lb)

Playing information
- Position: Prop
Club
Years	Team	Pld	T	G	FG	P
1998–01	Canterbury Bulldogs	18	4	0	0	16
2002–03	North Qld Cowboys	27	0	0	0	0
2004	South Sydney	15	1	0	0	4
	Total	60	5	0	0	20

David Thompson (born 17 March 1978) is an Australian former professional rugby league footballer who played for the Canterbury-Bankstown Bulldogs, North Queensland Cowboys and the South Sydney Rabbitohs.

== Background ==
Thompson was born in Sydney, New South Wales, Australia.

== Playing career ==
Thompson made his first grade debut for Canterbury-Bankstown in round 17 of the 1998 NRL season against South Sydney scoring a try in a 30–8 victory at the Sydney Football Stadium.

Canterbury finished the regular season in 9th place on the table and qualified for the finals. The club went on to win three sudden death matches in a row including the preliminary final over archrivals Parramatta. Parramatta led the match 18–2 with less than 10 minutes of the game left when Canterbury staged one of the greatest comebacks in finals history, scoring three tries to level the match at 18-18. Canterbury then went on to win the game 32–20 in extra-time.

He was part of the Canterbury side who lost the 1998 NRL Grand Final to the Brisbane Broncos. Over the next three years, Thompson only played seven games for Canterbury and he later joined North Queensland for the 2002 NRL season.

Thompson spent two years at North Queensland where the club missed the finals. In 2004, he joined South Sydney and played one season at the club where they finished last on the table.
