= Paul Dezolt =

Australian international rugby league footballer (born 19678)

Personal information
- Full name: Paul Dezolt
- Born: 29 August 1978 (age 48) Ingham, Queensland, Australia

Playing information
- Height: 187 cm (6 ft 2 in)
- Weight: 98 kg (15 st 6 lb)
- Position: Hooker
Club
Years	Team	Pld	T	G	FG	P
1999–03	North Qld Cowboys	30	5	0	0	20
2004	New Zealand Warriors	3	0	0	0	0
	Total	33	5	0	0	20
Representative
Years	Team	Pld	T	G	FG	P
2003	Italy	1	1	0	0	4

Paul Dezolt (born 29 August 1978) is a former professional rugby league footballer. His position of choice was at Hooker.

== North Queensland ==
A Herbert River junior, Dezolt started his career at the North Queensland Cowboys, debuting in 1999. Dezolt played 30 first grade games for the club in the National Rugby League before being deemed surplus to requirements in 2004. Dezolt originally looked to join the Queensland Cup in 2004, hoping to fight his way back into the Cowboys.

While Dezolt was at the Cowboys he made his debut for Italy, being named the Man of the Match in the 2003 Ionian Cup clash against Greece.

== New Zealand Warriors ==
In 2004, Dezolt signed a short-term deal with the New Zealand Warriors. He made his debut for the club against the Cowboys, at his old home ground Dairy Farmers Stadium. While he was at the Warriors he also played two games for the Counties Manukau Jetz in the Bartercard Cup. He was released from his contract on 14 June, sixteen days before it expired.

== Return to Queensland ==
After leaving the Warriors, Dezolt then returned to the Queensland Cup, joining the Easts Tigers. Dezolt returned home in 2006 and was part of the Herbert River Crushers side that won the Townsville and District Rugby League title for the first time.
