= Shane Marteene =

Australian rugby league footballer

Personal information
- Full name: Shane Marteene
- Born: 25 May 1977 (age 48) Moranbah, Queensland, Australia

Playing information
- Height: 180 cm (5 ft 11 in)
- Weight: 92 kg (14 st 7 lb)
- Position: Centre, Wing
Club
Years	Team	Pld	T	G	FG	P
1996–03	Canterbury Bulldogs	70	16	0	0	64
2004–05	South Sydney	22	5	0	0	20
2005	St. George Illawarra	2	1	0	0	4
	Total	94	22	0	0	88

Shane Marteene (born 25 May 1977) is an Australian former professional rugby league footballer who played in the 1990s and 2000s for the Canterbury-Bankstown Bulldogs, South Sydney and St. George Illawarra Dragons, as a wing or centre.

== Early life ==
Marteene was in Moranbah, Queensland, Australila.

Marteene played his junior rugby league for the Clermont Bears.

== Playing career ==
Marteene made his first grade debut for Canterbury in 1996 against Newcastle. In 1997, Marteene won the reserve grade premiership with the club after defeating Auckland in the final. He played at centre for Canterbury in their loss to Brisbane in the 1998 NRL grand final. Over the following years, Marteene spent most of his time with Canterbury in reserve grade and was occasionally called into the first grade team.

In 2004, Marteene joined South Sydney. In a Round 4 match against Cronulla, Marteene was deliberately kneed in the head by Cronulla player Greg Bird. Bird was then sent off and later suspended for 10 weeks. After the incident, Bird personally apologized to Marteene and wrote a letter of apology to the South Sydney club. At the end of 2004, Souths finished last on the table. Marteene played on with Souths in 2005 but made a mid season switch to St George before retiring at the end of the year.
