= Travis Norton =

Australian rugby league footballer

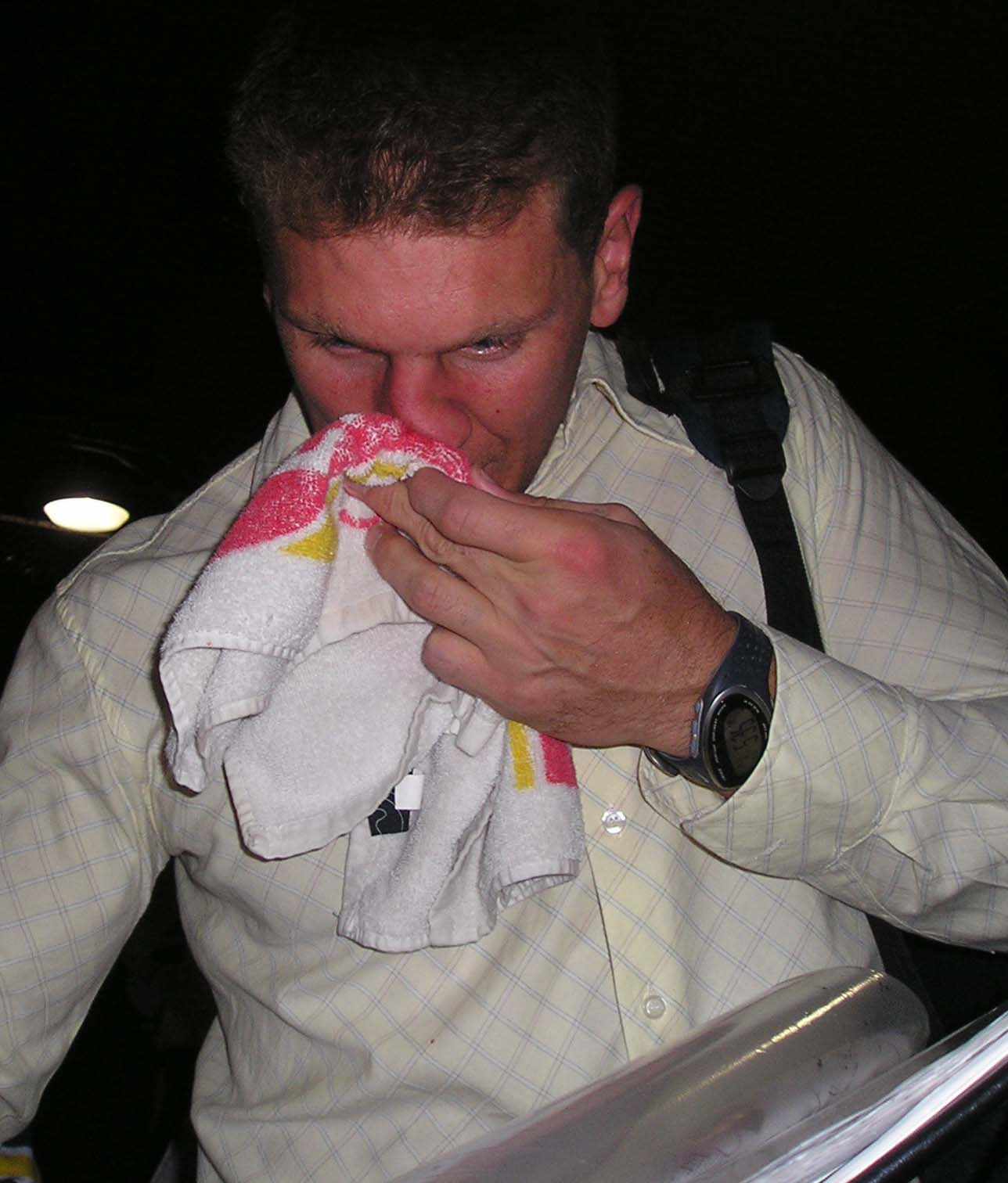

Personal information
- Full name: Travis Norton
- Born: 12 April 1976 (age 50) Redcliffe, Queensland, Australia

Playing information
- Height: 180 cm (5 ft 11 in)
- Weight: 96 kg (15 st 2 lb)
- Position: Lock, Five-eighth
Club
Years	Team	Pld	T	G	FG	P
1995–96	South Qld Crushers	33	7	14	0	56
1997–03	Canterbury Bulldogs	116	20	0	0	80
2004–06	North Qld Cowboys	58	8	0	0	32
	Total	207	35	14	0	168
Representative
Years	Team	Pld	T	G	FG	P
2002–04	Queensland	5	0	0	0	0

Travis Norton (born 12 April 1976 in Redcliffe, Queensland) is an Australian former professional rugby league footballer who played in the 1990s and 2000s. A Queensland State of Origin representative lock forward, he played his club football with the South Queensland Crushers, Canterbury-Bankstown and the North Queensland Cowboys, whom he captained to the 2005 NRL Grand Final.

== Background ==
Norton played his junior rugby league for the Moranbah Miners.

== Playing career ==
Norton made his first grade debut for South Queensland against the Canberra Raiders in round 1 of the 1995 ARL season at Lang Park. Norton departed South Queensland at the end of 1996 after the club finished with the Wooden Spoon.

In 1997, Norton joined Canterbury who had aligned themselves with the rival Super League competition. In the 1998 NRL season, Norton played 29 games as Canterbury finished 9th on the table and qualified for the finals. Canterbury proceeded to make the 1998 NRL Grand Final after winning four sudden death elimination matches in a row including the club's famous preliminary final victory over rivals Parramatta which is considered to be one of the greatest comebacks of all time. After being 18–2 down with less than ten minutes remaining, Canterbury scored three tries to take the game into extra-time before winning the match 32–20.

The following week, he played at lock forward for Canterbury in their loss at the 1998 NRL grand final to the Brisbane Broncos. Norton played with Canterbury until the end of 2003, when salary cap issues saw him leave the club to join the North Queensland Cowboys.

Norton captained the Cowboys from 2004 to 2006, leading them to the 2005 NRL Grand Final which they lost to the Wests Tigers, with Norton scoring a try. That year, he was joined at the Cowboys by fellow ex-Bulldogs teammate Johnathan Thurston.

Norton retired at the end of the 2006 NRL season.
