= Arthur Kitinas =

Australian RL coach and former rugby league footballer

Personal information
- Born: 29 November 1959 (age 66) Perth, Australia

Playing information
- Position: Hooker
Club
Years	Team	Pld	T	G	FG	P
1977	Eastern Suburbs	1	0	0	0	0
1978	South Sydney	9	1	0	0	3
	Total	10	1	0	0	3

Coaching information
Club
Years	Team	Gms	W	D	L	W%
2004	South Sydney	13	3	1	9	23
Representative
Years	Team	Gms	W	D	L	W%
2006–07	Fiji	2	2	0	0	100
- Source: As of 5 November 2023

Arthur Kitinas (born 29 November 1959) is an Australian former professional rugby league footballer who played in the 1970s, and coached in the 2000s. He played in the New South Wales Rugby League (NSWRL) competition.

A hooker, Kitinas trialled with Sydney's Eastern Suburbs club and played just one top grade match, in 1977, before joining the South Sydney Rabbitohs the following season. The established hookers at the South Sydney club, Test player George Piggins along with Ken Stewart, saw the promising young Kitinas play very little first grade at that club either.

Kitinas spent time as an assistant coach at South Sydney before an unsuccessful stint in the main job in 2004, as a replacement for Paul Langmack.

Kitinas joined the Wests Tigers coaching team in 2006 and currently coaches the Balmain Ryde-Eastwood Premier League team. In 2006 and 2007 he also coached the Australian Fijians team. Kitinas now coaches the South Sydney Rabbitohs SG Ball team
