= Mitchell Sargent =

Australian rugby league footballer

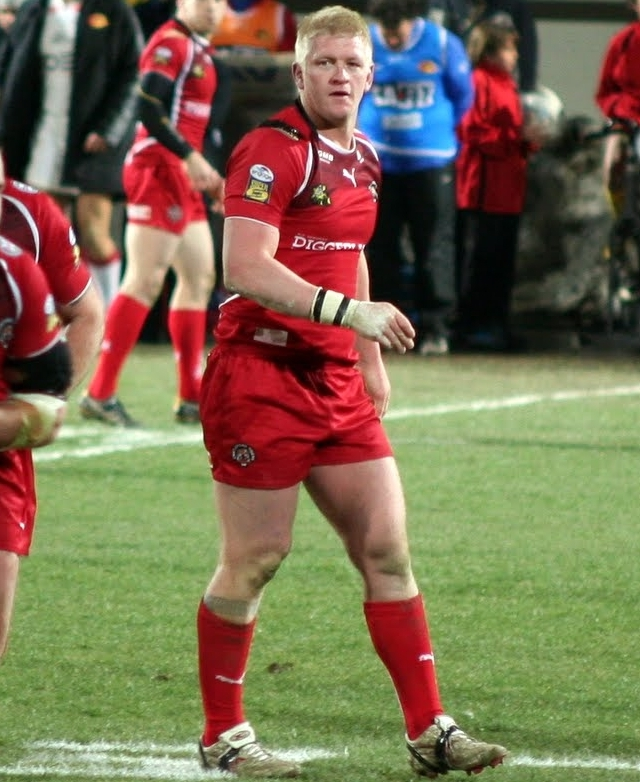

Personal information
- Born: 2 July 1979 (age 47) Canowindra, New South Wales, Australia

Playing information
- Height: 187 cm (6 ft 2 in)
- Weight: 107 kg (16 st 12 lb)
- Position: Prop
Club
Years	Team	Pld	T	G	FG	P
2002–03	Melbourne Storm	35	3	1	0	14
2004–06	North Qld Cowboys	66	3	0	0	12
2007	Newcastle Knights	14	1	0	0	4
2008–10	Castleford Tigers	61	8	0	0	32
	Total	176	15	1	0	62
Representative
Years	Team	Pld	T	G	FG	P
2006	NSW Country	1	0	0	0	0

Mitchell Sargent (born 2 July 1979 in Canowindra, New South Wales), also known by the nickname of "Sarge", is an Australian former professional rugby league footballer who played in the 2000s and 2010s. A Country New South Wales representative forward, he played club football in the NRL for the Melbourne Storm, the North Queensland Cowboys and Newcastle Knights and in the Super League for English side, Castleford Tigers.

== Playing career ==
Sargent made his first grade debut for Melbourne in round 1 2002 against the Canberra Raiders, scoring a try in a 16–12 victory at the Olympic Park Stadium.

Sargent's final game for Melbourne was their 30-0 semi final defeat against Canterbury-Bankstown at the Sydney Football Stadium. In 2004, Sargent signed for North Queensland and was part of the club's first ever finals campaign. He played from the bench in North Queensland's preliminary final loss against the Sydney Roosters at Telstra Stadium.

Sargent played from the interchange bench in the North Queensland Cowboys' first ever grand final in 2005 which was lost to the Wests Tigers.

On 24 August 2006 Sargent had his contract with the North Queensland Cowboys terminated after he tested positive to cocaine from "in-house tests" conducted by the club. According to a statement from Cowboys management, Sargent admitted using the drug and waived his right to a 'B' sample .

National Rugby League Chief Executive David Gallop confirmed in the same report that Sargent would not face the normal mandatory two-year ban prescribed by the World Anti-Doping Agency as the positive result was from an in-house, out-of-competition test.

Although banished from the North Queensland Cowboys' team, Sargent was offered a three-year contract (starting in 2007) with the Newcastle Knights, which he accepted . He stated that he was "over the moon to be given this second chance".

He left the Newcastle Knights after signing a two and half-year deal with Castleford in 2008.

Sargent left Castleford at the end of 2010 and is now retired.

== Career highlights ==
- NRL Debut: 2002 - Round 1, Storm v Canberra Raiders, Olympic Park, Melbourne
- SL Debut: 2008 - Round ??, Castleford v Huddersfield Giants

== External sources ==
- "Cowboy sacked for cocaine". The Sydney Morning Herald. 24 August 2006.
- "NRL star tests positive to cocaine". The Daily Telegraph. 24 August 2006. Archived from the original on 9 September 2006.
