= 2004 Sydney Roosters season =

← 2003	2005 →

The 2004 Sydney Roosters season was the 97th in the club's history. They competed in the NRL's 2004 Telstra Premiership and finished the regular season 1st, taking out the minor premiership before going on to reach the grand final which they lost to the Bulldogs.

== Results ==
Round	Opponent	Result	Syd.	Opp.	Date	Venue	Crowd
1	South Sydney Rabbitohs	Win	26	16	14 Mar	Sydney Football Stadium	16,516
2	Manly-Warringah Sea Eagles	Win	42	20	20 Mar	Brookvale Oval	18,674
3	Canterbury Bulldogs	Win	35	0	26 Mar	Sydney Football Stadium	26,465
4	Penrith Panthers	Loss	6	22	2 Apr	Telstra Stadium	25,852
5	Brisbane Broncos	Loss	14	26	9 Apr	Sydney Football Stadium	23,118
6	Newcastle Knights	Win	32	22	18 Apr	EnergyAustralia Stadium	22,126
7	St George-Illawarra Dragons	Win	11	8	25 Apr	Sydney Football Stadium	26,246
8	Canberra Raiders	Win	28	8	2 May	Sydney Football Stadium	11,067
9	Wests Tigers	Win	22	0	8 May	Sydney Football Stadium	11,789
10	Cronulla Sharks	Win	38	18	15 May	Toyota Park	14,321
11	BYE						
12	New Zealand Warriors	Win	58	6	30 May	Sydney Football Stadium	10,078
13	Canterbury Bulldogs	Loss	12	40	4 Jun	Telstra Stadium	22,572
14	BYE						
15	Newcastle Knights	Win	48	4	18 Jun	Sydney Football Stadium	11,678
16	Wests Tigers	Win	56	0	25 Jul	Campbelltown Stadium	18,669
17	North Queensland Cowboys	Win	32	22	3 Jul	Sydney Football Stadium	16,127
18	Parramatta Eels	Loss	12	26	14 Jul	Parramatta Stadium	10,118
19	St. George Illawarra Dragons	Win	18	14	16 Jul	Sydney Football Stadium	27,183
20	South Sydney Rabbitohs	Win	22	12	24 Jul	Sydney Football Stadium	13,564
21	Melbourne Storm	Win	26	10	1 Aug	Olympic Park	10,291
22	Cronulla Sharks	Loss	12	26	8 Aug	Sydney Football Stadium	13,742
23	Penrith Panthers	Win	44	12	13 Aug	Sydney Football Stadium	27,183
24	Canberra Raiders	Win	38	22	22 Aug	Canberra Stadium	15,312
25	New Zealand Warriors	Win	24	18	29 Aug	Ericsson Stadium	8,019
26	Parramatta Eels	Win	48	10	5 Sep	Sydney Football Stadium	24,114
Qualifying Final	Canberra Raiders	Win	38	12	12 Sep	Sydney Football Stadium	18,325
Preliminary Final	North Queensland Cowboys	Win	19	16	26 Sep	Telstra Stadium	
Grand Final	Canterbury Bulldogs	Loss	13	16	3 Oct	Telstra Stadium	82,127

== Notable events ==
- Due to a favourable draw, the Sydney Roosters did not play a premiership match in Queensland, although they did play a pre-season match there.
- The Sydney Roosters finished at the top of the table joint with the Bulldogs, but won the minor premiership on percentage.
- The Roosters beat the Wests Tigers twice in 2004 by scorelines of 22–0 and 56-0 in Rounds 9 and 16 respectively. It was the first time in almost 40 years that a single team had held their opponent scoreless over two matches.
- An unsavory incident occurred in Round 3 when a bottle was thrown onto the field as Brett Finch knocked on from the restart in their match against the Bulldogs. He allegedly threw it back to the crowd, and received a warning from the NRL for his actions.
- Justin Hodges was sent off in the team's Round 13 loss to the Bulldogs, costing him his place in that year's Queensland State of Origin side.
- The Roosters trailed 14–0 at halftime in their Round 19 match against the Dragons before coming back to win 18–14.
- Two of the Roosters' losses came against teams that failed to make the finals that year (Parramatta in Round 18 and Cronulla in Round 22). The other three losses were against teams that finished in the top four (Panthers in Round 4, Broncos in Round 5 and Bulldogs in Round 13).
- In June 2004 the Roosters were subject to salary cap troubles which resulted in wooden spoon betting being suspended after a bet of $50 was placed on the Roosters to finish last that season. However, the Roosters were cleared of any salary cap wrongdoing.
