= 2004 Bulldogs RLFC season =

The 2004 Bulldogs RLFC season was the 70th season in the club's history. Coached by Steve Folkes and captained by Steve Price, they competed in the NRL's 2004 Telstra Premiership, finishing the regular season 2nd (out of 15). The Bulldogs' goal-kicker Hazem El Masri was the competition's top point scorer as they went on to claim their 8th Premiership with a 16–13 win over the Sydney Roosters in the 2004 NRL Grand Final.

== Match results ==
2004 Season Results
| Round | Opponent | Result | Bulldogs | Opposition | Date | Venue | Crowd |
|---|---|---|---|---|---|---|---|
| 1 | Parramatta Eels | Win | 48 | 14 | 13 March | Telstra Stadium | 42,717 |
| 2 | Cronulla-Sutherland Sharks | Win | 24 | 20 | 20 March | Sydney Showground | 9,149 |
| 3 | Sydney Roosters | Loss | 0 | 35 | 26 March | Sydney Football Stadium | 26, 465 |
| 4 | Bye | | | | | | |
| 5 | Manly-Warringah Sea Eagles | Win | 28 | 26 | 11 April | Telstra Stadium | 25,771 (Double Header) |
| 6 | New Zealand Warriors | Win | 24 | 18 | 16 April | Westpac Stadium | 13,772 |
| 7 | South Sydney Rabbitohs | Win | 34 | 8 | 26 April | Telstra Stadium | 12,276 |
| 8 | Brisbane Broncos | Win | 25 | 18 | 2 May | Telstra Stadium | 17,104 |
| 9 | Newcastle Knights | Loss | 6 | 32 | 9 May | Energy Australia Stadium | 16,562 |
| 10 | St. George Illawarra Dragons | Win | 38 | 12 | 15 May | WIN Stadium | 18,267 |
| 11 | Wests Tigers | Loss | 26 | 30 | 22 May | Express Advocate Stadium | 14,897 |
| 12 | Penrith Panthers | Loss | 29 | 40 | 30 May | Penrith Stadium | 19,856 |
| 13 | Sydney Roosters | Win | 40 | 12 | 4 June | Telstra Stadium | 22,572 |
| 14 | BYE | | | | | | |
| 15 | Canberra Raiders | Win | 24 | 20 | 19 June | Express Advocate Stadium | 10,473 |
| 16 | North Queensland Cowboys | Win | 32 | 18 | 27 June | Dairy Farmers Stadium | 20,207 |
| 17 | Manly-Warringah Sea Eagles | Win | 50 | 32 | 4 July | Brookvale Oval | 12,328 |
| 18 | Melbourne Storm | Win | 25 | 18 | 11 July | Sydney Showground | 7,252 |
| 19 | Cronulla-Sutherland Sharks | Win | 37 | 26 | 18 July | Toyota Park | 8,355 |
| 20 | Wests Tigers | Win | 24 | 20 | 23 July | Campbelltown Stadium | 16,540 |
| 21 | Penrith Panthers | Win | 46 | 20 | 30 July | Telstra Stadium | 21,644 |
| 22 | North Queensland Cowboys | Win | 36 | 16 | 8 August | Sydney Showground | 10,988 |
| 23 | Brisbane Broncos | Win | 46 | 18 | 15 August | Suncorp Stadium | 49,571 |
| 24 | Melbourne Storm | Loss | 12 | 22 | 22 August | Olympic Park | 9,923 |
| 25 | Newcastle Knights | Win | 52 | 6 | 27 August | Telstra Stadium | 20,043 |
| 26 | New Zealand Warriors | Win | 54 | 10 | 5 September | Ericsson Stadium | 9,930 |
| Qualifying Final | North Queensland Cowboys | Loss | 22 | 30 | 11 September | Telstra Stadium | 18,371 |
| Semi Final | Melbourne Storm | Win | 43 | 18 | 19 September | Sydney Football Stadium | 23,750 |
| Preliminary Final | Penrith Panthers | Win | 30 | 14 | 25 September | Sydney Football Stadium | 37,868 |
| GRAND FINAL | Sydney Roosters | Win | 16 | 13 | 3 October | Telstra Stadium | 82,127 |

| Round | Position |
|---|---|
| 1 | 1/15 |
| 2 | 1/15 |
| 3 | 6/15 |
| 4 | 6/15 |
| 5 | 4/15 |
| 6 | 1/15 |
| 7 | 1/15 |
| 8 | 1/15 |
| 9 | 2/15 |
| 10 | 2/15 |
| 11 | 4/15 |
| 12 | 4/15 |
| 13 | 2/15 |
| 14 | 2/15 |
| 15 | 3/15 |
| 16 | 2/15 |
| 17 | 2/15 |
| 18 | 2/15 |
| 19 | 2/15 |
| 20 | 2/15 |
| 21 | 2/15 |
| 22 | 1/15 |
| 23 | 1/15 |
| 24 | 2/15 |
| 25 | 2/15 |
| 26 | 2/15 |

== See also ==
List of Canterbury-Bankstown Bulldogs seasons
