= Angus Crichton =

Australia international rugby league footballer

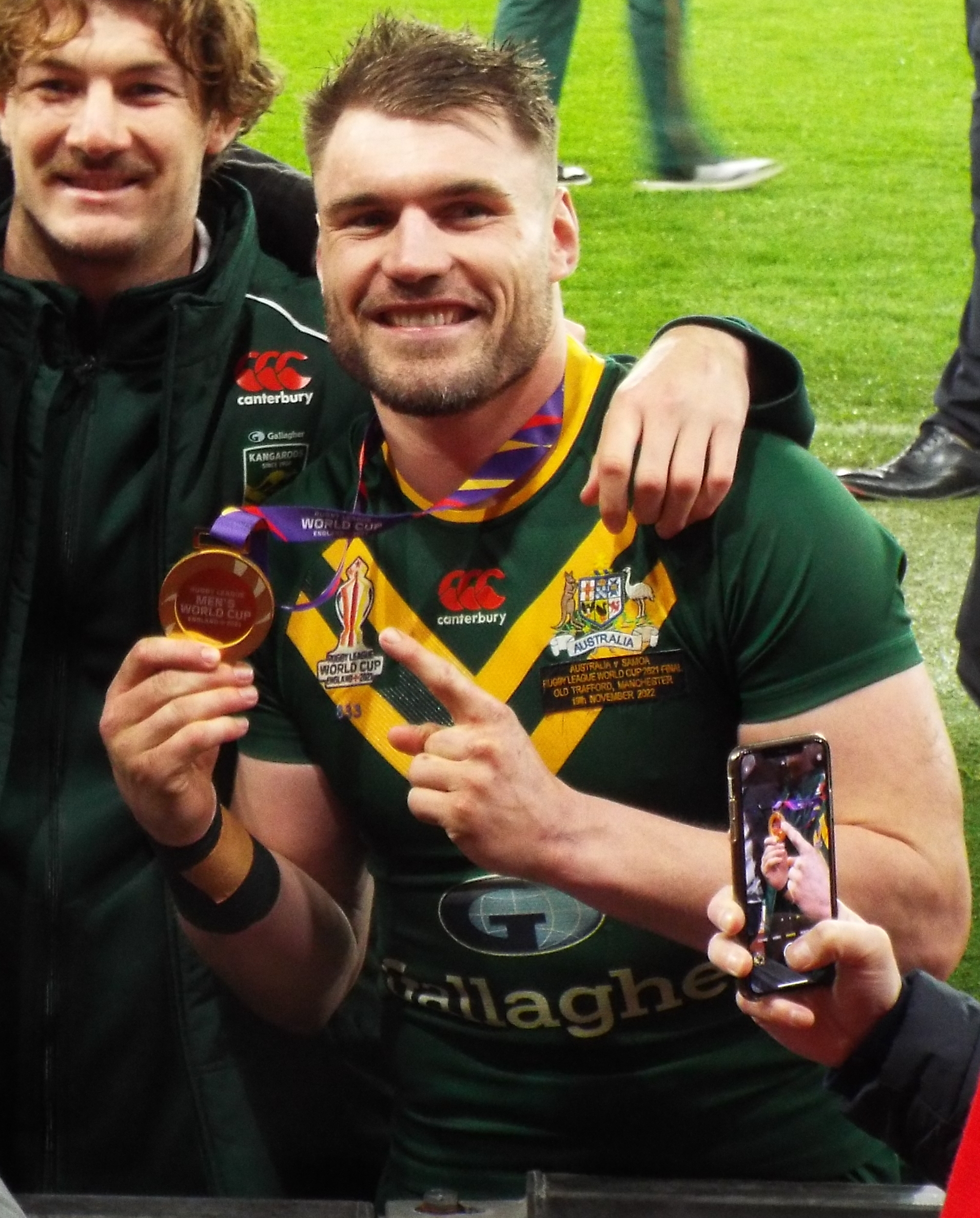

Personal information
- Full name: Angus Crichton
- Born: 5 February 1996 (age 30) Temora, New South Wales, Australia
- Height: 187 cm (6 ft 2 in)
- Weight: 102 kg (16 st 1 lb)

Playing information

Rugby league
- Position: Second-row
Club
| Years | Team | Pld | T | G | FG | P |
|---|---|---|---|---|---|---|
| 2016–18 | South Sydney | 55 | 11 | 0 | 0 | 44 |
| 2019–26 | Sydney Roosters | 159 | 41 | 0 | 0 | 164 |
| | Total | 214 | 52 | 0 | 0 | 208 |
Representative
| Years | Team | Pld | T | G | FG | P |
| 2018–25 | New South Wales | 17 | 2 | 0 | 0 | 8 |
| 2022 | Prime Minister's XIII | 1 | 1 | 0 | 0 | 4 |
| 2022–25 | Australia | 11 | 4 | 0 | 0 | 16 |

Rugby union
Club
| Years | Team | Pld | T | G | FG | P |
|---|---|---|---|---|---|---|
| 2027– | Waratahs | 0 | 0 | 0 | 0 | 0 |
- Source: As of 8 October 2026

Angus Crichton (/ˈæŋɡəsˈkraɪtən/; born 5 February 1996) is an Australian professional rugby union footballer who plays for Super Rugby team the NSW Waratahs.

He previously played first grade rugby league for the South Sydney Rabbitohs and Sydney Roosters and has represented New South Wales Blues in State of Origin, as well as the Kangaroos and Prime Minister's XIII. He was part of the Sydney Rooster's NRL premiership sides in the 2019 and 2026 NRL Grand Final.

== Early life ==
Crichton was born in 1996 in Temora, in the Riverina region of New South Wales, to Pip and Charlie Crichton. He was raised on the family farm in the nearby town of Young where his father worked as a cattle-farmer. During his youth, Angus' father Charlie played for Randwick and was an Australian Schoolboys representative in the 1980s.

Crichton began playing junior rugby union with his local club the Young Yabbies, and was reported to be a standout player by his former junior rugby coach. In 2009, he moved to Sydney to attend high school as a boarder at The Scots College. Crichton played three seasons with the school's 1st XV rugby team. In 2013, with Crichton playing at number 8, Scots College 1st XV won the AAGPS premiership jointly with Newington College. The following season Crichton played as an outside centre and the 1st XV went undefeated and won the premiership outright. Crichton was declared as one of the teams' three best players by rugby website Green and Gold Rugby, alongside fullback Guy Porter and scrum-half Theo Strang. Crichton represented the New South Wales Schoolboys I team and the Australia A Schoolboys squad for 2013. In the latter season Crichton was selected in the Australian Schoolboys squad but did not play a game.

During their time at Scots, Crichton developed a close friendship with his 1st XV teammate Jack Maddocks, who went on to play for the NSW Waratahs and Wallabies..

Crichton is first cousins with Penrith Panthers forward Liam Martin and also related to Hawthorn Hawks triple premiership winner Luke Breust.

== Rugby league career ==
=== Early career ===
Crichton spent some time in rugby league with the Sydney Roosters' lower grade teams in 2014, before being selected for the Australian Schoolboys rugby union team that same year. On 31 October 2014, he signed a 2-year contract with the South Sydney Rabbitohs, starting in 2015.

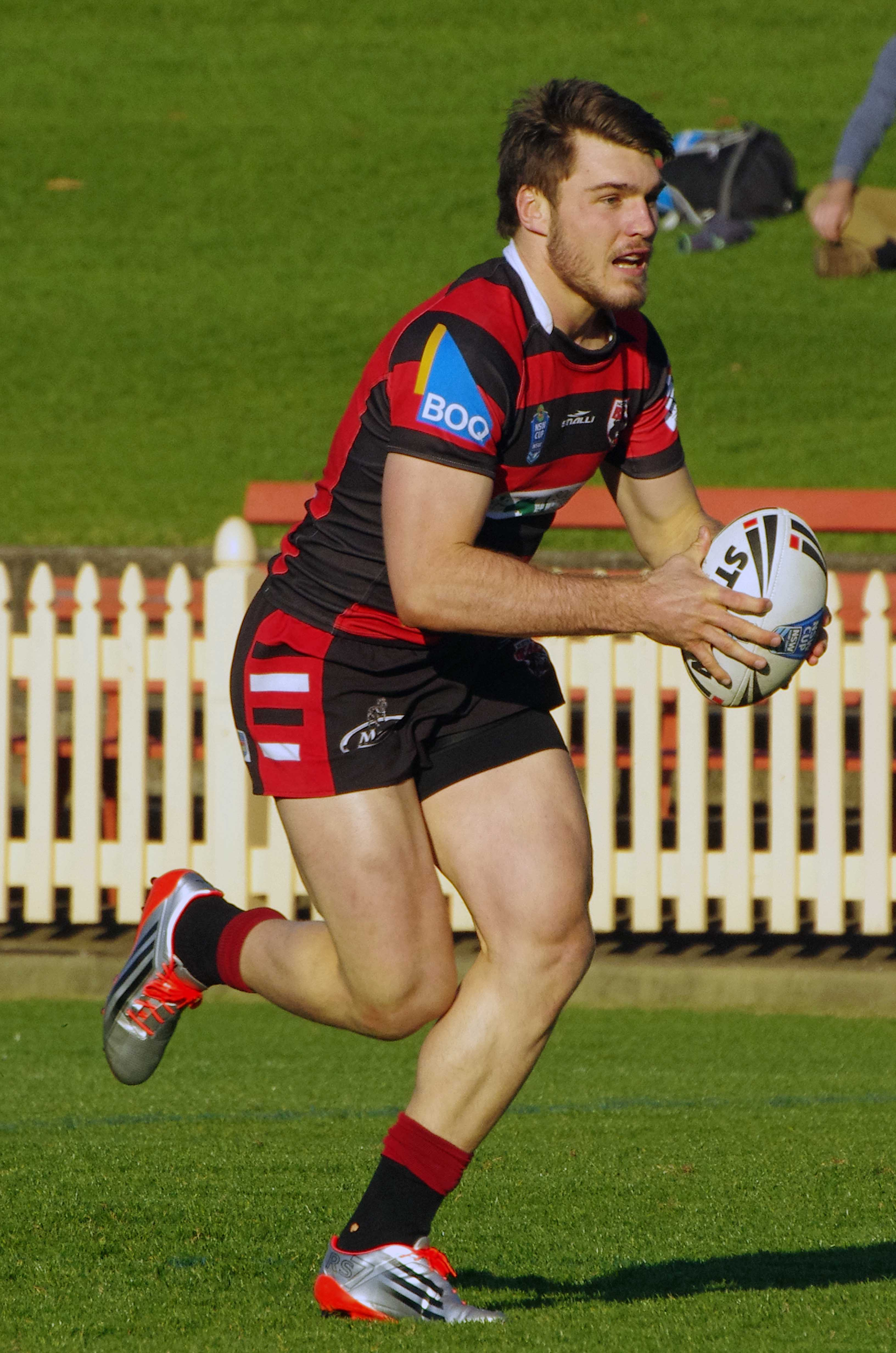
Crichton playing for the North Sydney Bears in 2015

In 2015, he played for the Rabbitohs' NYC team, before re-signing with them late in the year on a 2-year contract until the end of 2018.

=== 2016 ===
In 2016, Crichton was promoted to the Rabbitohs' New South Wales Cup team, North Sydney Bears.

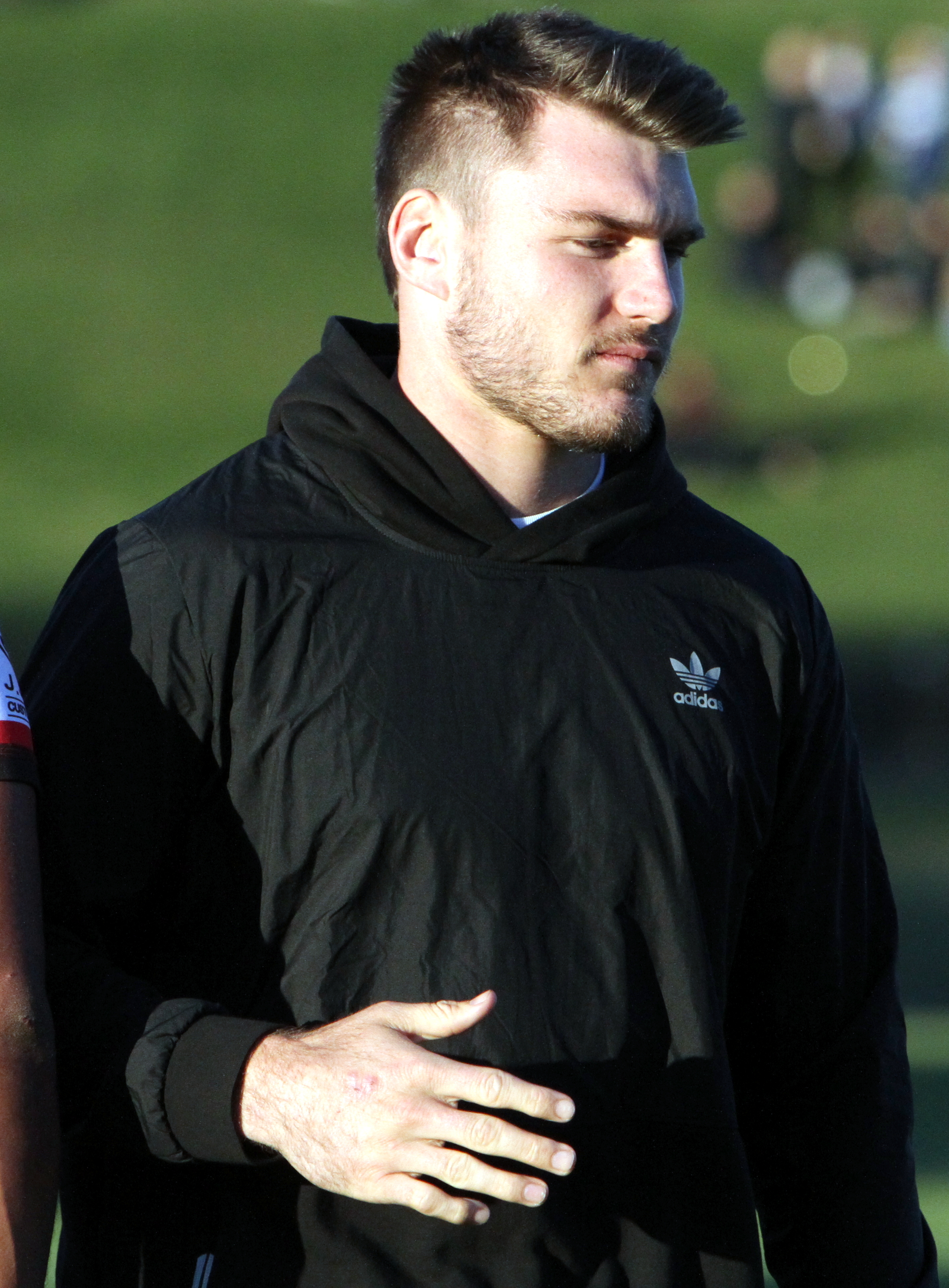
Crichton in 2016

In Round 19 of the 2016 NRL season, he made his NRL debut for the Rabbitohs against the Brisbane Broncos.

=== 2017 ===
The 2017 season was Crichton's breakout year, earning rave reviews in an otherwise disappointing South Sydney side. He finished the season with 22 appearances and 7 tries including a hat-trick against the Gold Coast Titans. On 18 December 2017, after much speculation over his future Crichton signed a 3-year deal to join South Sydney's arch rivals the Sydney Roosters on a three-year deal starting in 2019.

=== 2018 ===
After recurring injuries to his left middle-finger, Crichton underwent surgery to amputate the top half of the digit in the preseason. On 28 May 2018, Crichton was named to make his debut for the NSW Blues off the interchange bench in Game 1 of the 2018 State of Origin series at Melbourne Cricket Ground. Crichton played in all 3 matches for NSW as the Blues won their first Origin shield since 2014.

=== 2019 ===
Crichton made his debut for the Sydney Roosters against his former club South Sydney in Round 1 of the 2019 NRL season at the Sydney Cricket Ground which resulted in a 26-16 loss, Crichton was involved in a scuffle with Souths player Cody Walker in the second half where Walker called Crichton a "traitor". Crichton scored his first try for the club in Round 4 against Brisbane at the same venue. Crichton was later selected to play for New South Wales in Game 1 of the 2019 State of Origin series which New South Wales would go on to lose at Suncorp Stadium. Crichton was one of several players dropped from the Blues side for Game 2.

Crichton played for the Sydney Roosters in the club's 2019 NRL Grand Final victory over the Canberra Raiders at ANZ Stadium. It was Crichton's first premiership victory as a player and the club's second consecutive premiership victory.

On 7 October, Crichton was named at second row for the U23 Junior Australian side.

=== 2020 ===
On 22 February, Crichton played for the Sydney Roosters in their 2020 World Club Challenge victory defeating St Helens 20-12.

In round 5 of the 2020 NRL season, Crichton scored two tries as the Sydney Roosters defeated Canterbury-Bankstown 42-6 at Bankwest Stadium.

Crichton played in the 2020 State of Origin series playing all three games in the 2-1 series loss, coming off the bench in the first origin and then started the next two due to Captain Boyd Cordner suffering another head knock ruling him out of the series.

=== 2021 ===
During the Sydney Roosters shock defeat to Brisbane in round 11 of the 2021 NRL season, Crichton was placed on report for a high tackle. He was later suspended for two games.

Crichton played a total of 20 games for the Sydney Roosters in the 2021 NRL season including the club's two finals matches. The Sydney Roosters would be eliminated from the second week of the finals losing to Manly 42-6.

=== 2022 ===
On 19 June, Crichton was selected by New South Wales for Game 2 of the 2022 State of Origin series, after missing out on selection for Game 1.

In Round 23 of the NRL, Crichton scored two tries in the Sydney Roosters dominant 72-6 victory over the Wests Tigers. In Round 25, Crichton became the first player to score a try at the new Sydney Football Stadium as the Sydney Roosters defeated arch-rivals South Sydney 26-16.

In October he was named in the Australia squad for the 2021 Rugby League World Cup.

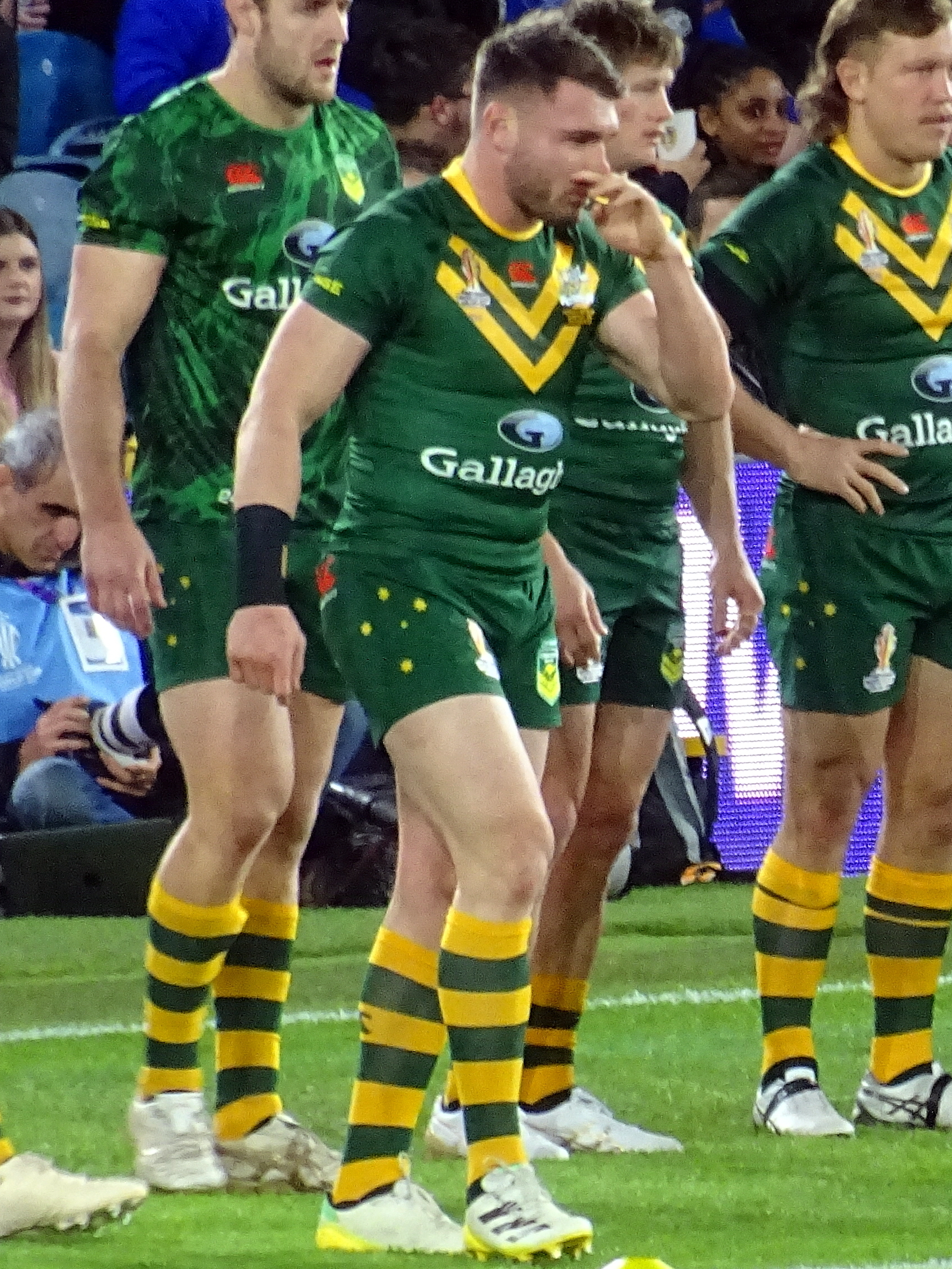
Crichton warming up for the Kangaroos at the 2021 RLWC

Crichton represented Australia in their 2021 Rugby League World Cup final victory over Samoa. During the second half of the match, he was sent to the sin bin after hitting Samoa's Chanel Harris-Tavita with a raised forearm knocking out his opponent. After returning to the field, Crichton dropped the ball over the tryline which cost his team a try scoring opportunity. Australia held on to win by 30-10.

=== 2023 ===
In February, it was announced that Crichton would be granted indefinite personal leave after it had been revealed he was diagnosed with Bipolar Disorder. Crichton's father released a statement which said “I can confirm today that Angus is under appropriate professional support and treatment for medically diagnosed bipolar disorder which he has been dealing with for sometime, He is full supported by his family, his management and the Sydney Roosters club as he works towards recovery, while no timeline has been set for his return to Rugby League, we will continue to trust his medical team and know those with the Rugby League community will respect his right to privacy during this time".

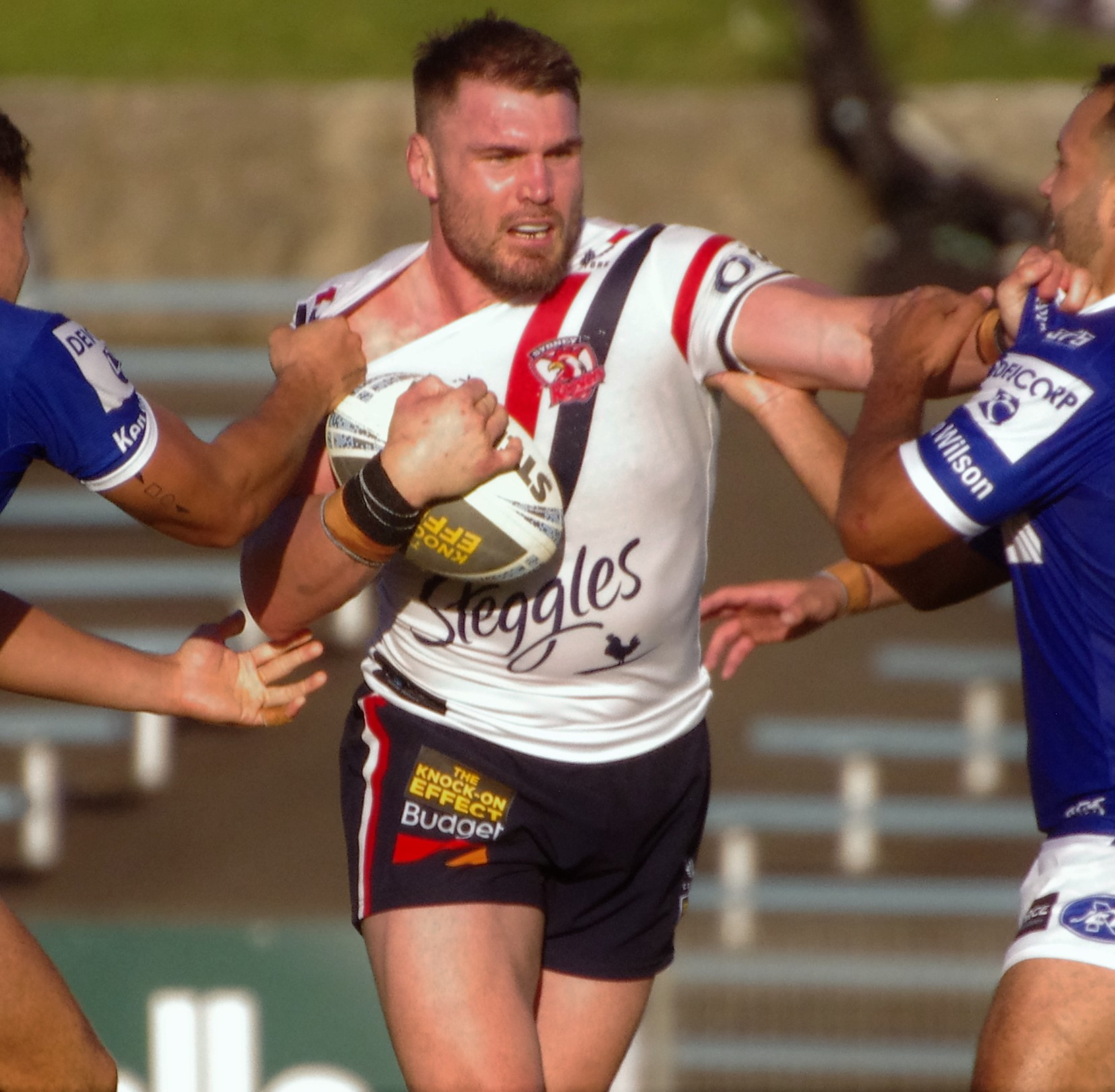
Crichton playing for the Roosters in 2023

Crichton played 13 matches for the Sydney Roosters in the 2023 NRL season as the club finished 7th on the table and qualified for the finals. Crichton played in both of the clubs finals games as they were eliminated in the second week against Melbourne.

=== 2024 ===
In round 9 of the 2024 NRL season, Crichton scored two tries for the Sydney Roosters in their 40-18 victory over Brisbane. The following week he scored another two tries in a 38–18 win over the New Zealand Warriors.

On 26 May, Crichton was selected for New South Wales ahead of the 2024 State of Origin series. He started all three games for the Blues, taking out the Wally Lewis Medal and Brad Fittler Medal for his dominant displays as an edge forward and enforcer throughout the Series.

On 1 July, Crichton re-signed with the Sydney Roosters on a two-year deal reportedly worth $1.6 million.

In round 25, Crichton scored his second career hat-trick against the Gold Coast Titans.

=== 2025 ===
In May, Crichton was selected by New South Wales ahead of game one in the 2025 State of Origin series. He played in all three games as New South Wales lost the series 2-1.

Crichton played 21 matches for the Sydney Roosters in the 2025 NRL season as the club finished 8th on the table and qualified for the finals. He played in the clubs elimination final loss against Cronulla.

=== 2026 ===
Crichton played 16 matches for the Sydney Roosters in the 2026 NRL season including the clubs 2026 NRL Grand Final victory over Newcastle.

== Rugby union career ==
Since 2023, there was speculation that Crichton might move to rugby union. Rugby Australia was reportedly in talks with Crichton in 2023 and he was close to signing for the Perth-based Western Force. In January 2026, Crichton signed with Rugby Australia to play for the New South Wales Waratahs on a two-year deal beginning in 2027. Upon the announcement of his signing, Crichton stated that it was his childhood dream to play for the Wallabies, and his move was largely motivated by a desire to play at the 2027 Rugby World Cup in Australia.

== Rugby league statistics ==
| † | Denotes seasons in which Crichton won an NRL Premiership |

| Year | Team | Games | Tries | Pts |
|---|---|---|---|---|
| 2016 | South Sydney Rabbitohs | 8 | 1 | 4 |
| 2017 | South Sydney Rabbitohs | 22 | 7 | 28 |
| 2018 | South Sydney Rabbitohs | 25 | 3 | 12 |
| 2019† | Sydney Roosters | 26 | 2 | 8 |
| 2020 | Sydney Roosters | 15 | 5 | 20 |
| 2021 | Sydney Roosters | 20 | 9 | 36 |
| 2022 | Sydney Roosters | 25 | 6 | 24 |
| 2023 | Sydney Roosters | 13 | 1 | 4 |
| 2024 | Sydney Roosters | 23 | 11 | 44 |
| 2025 | Sydney Roosters | 21 | 5 | 20 |
| 2026† | Sydney Roosters | 15 | 2 | 8 |
| | Totals | 214 | 52 | 208 |

*denotes season competing

== Honours ==
=== Individual ===
- Jack Rayner Players’ Player: 2017
- Roy Asotasi Members Choice: 2017
- The Burrow Appreciation Award: 2017
- Roosters Our Community Award: 2020, 2022
- RLPA Dream Team (Second Row): 2021, 2024
- Dally M Team of the Year (Second Row): 2024

=== Sydney Roosters ===
- 2019 NRL Premiership
- 2026 NRL Premiership
- 2020 World Club Challenge

=== New South Wales ===
- State of Origin series: (2018, 2019, 2021, 2024)
- 2024 Wally Lewis Medal
- 2024 Brad Fittler Medal
- 2024 The Daily Telegraph People's Choice Award

=== Australia ===
- 2021 Rugby League World Cup

== Personal life ==
In 2022, Crichton opened a barbershop he co-owns in Bondi Beach called AC Flo. In February 2023 Crichton's father Charlie revealed that Angus was diagnosed with bipolar disorder (BD) and took an indefinite break from all professional duties while seeking specialist treatment. Crichton returned from his indefinite leave ahead of the Roosters' ANZAC Day clash against the St. George Illawarra Dragons in April 2023.
