= State of Origin results and statistics =

State of Origin results and statistics have been accumulating since the 1980 State of Origin game. Every game played under State of Origin selection rules, including the additional 1987 exhibition match and the matches played between New South Wales and Queensland for the Super League Tri-series are detailed below unless stated otherwise.

== Results ==
=== Series matches ===
Queensland have won 25 series, whilst New South Wales have won 17. As of 2025, there have been two drawn series (1999 and 2002). On both occasions, Queensland retained the shield as the winner of the previous series.

Date	Details	Referee(s)	Ground	Crowd	Man of the Match
Tuesday, 1 June 1982	New South Wales 20 (Ziggy Niszczot 2, Steve Mortimer, Brad Izzard tries; Michael Cronin 4 goals); Queensland 16 (Mitch Brennan, John Ribot tries; Mal Meninga 5 goals)	Kevin Roberts	Lang Park	27,326	Mal Meninga
Tuesday, 8 June 1982	Queensland 11 (Gene Miles, John Ribot, Paul Vautin tries; Colin Scott goal); New South Wales 7 (Brad Izzard try; Tony Melrose 2 goals)	Barry Gomersall	Lang Park	19,435	Rod Morris
Tuesday, 22 June 1982	Queensland 10 (Wally Lewis, Rohan Hancock tries; Mal Meninga 2 goals); New South Wales 5 (Phil Duke try; Michael Cronin goal)	Don Wilson	Sydney Cricket Ground	20,242	Wally Lewis
Tuesday, 7 June 1983	Queensland 24 (Wally Lewis 2, Mark Murray tries; Mal Meninga 6 goals); New South Wales 12 (Steve Ella, Eric Grothe, Sr. tries; Phil Sigsworth 2 goals)	Barry Gomersall	Lang Park	29,412	Wally Lewis
Tuesday, 21 June 1983	New South Wales 10 (Steve Ella, Neil Hunt tries; Michael Cronin goal); Queensland 6 (Mal Meninga try; Mal Meninga goal)	John Gocher	Sydney Cricket Ground	21,620	Peter Sterling
Tuesday, 28 June 1983	Queensland 43 (Mitch Brennan 2, Greg Conescu, Bryan Niebling, Gene Miles, Steve Stacey, Dave Brown tries; Mal Meninga 6, Colin Scott goals; Wally Lewis field goal); New South Wales 22 (Chris Anderson 3, Steve Mortimer tries; Michael Cronin 3 goals)	Robin Whitfield	Lang Park	26,084	Wally Lewis
Tuesday, 29 May 1984	Queensland 29 (Kerry Boustead 3, Gene Miles, Wally Lewis, Paul Vautin tries; Mal Meninga 2 goals; Wally Lewis field goal); New South Wales 12 (Noel Cleal try; Ross Conlon 4 goals)	Kevin Roberts	Lang Park	33,662	Wally Lewis
Tuesday, 19 June 1984	Queensland 14 (Greg Dowling, Gene Miles tries; Mal Meninga 3 goals); New South Wales 2 (Ross Conlon goal)	Barry Gomersall	Sydney Cricket Ground	29,088	Wally Lewis
Tuesday, 17 July 1984	New South Wales 22 (Brian Johnston 2, Noel Cleal tries; Ross Conlon 5 goals); Queensland 12 (Kerry Boustead, Bob Lindner tries; Mal Meninga 2 goals)	Kevin Roberts	Lang Park	16,559	Steve Mortimer
Tuesday, 28 May 1985	New South Wales 18 (Michael O' Connor 2 tries; Michael O'Connor 5 goals)); Queensland 2 (Mal Meninga goal)	Kevin Roberts	Lang Park	33,011	Peter Wynn
Tuesday, 11 June 1985	New South Wales 21 (Ben Elias, Brett Kenny, Steve Mortimer tries; Michael O'Connor 4 goals; Michael O'Connor field goal); Queensland 14 (Ian French, Bob Lindner tries; Mal Meninga 3 goals)	Barry Gomersall	Sydney Cricket Ground	39,068	Wally Lewis
Tuesday, 23 July 1985	Queensland 20 (Dale Shearer 2, Ian French, John Ribot tries; Mal Meninga 2 goals); New South Wales 6 (Steve Ella try; Michael O'Connor goal)	Barry Gomersall	Lang Park	18,825	Wally Fullerton-Smith
Tuesday, 27 May 1986	New South Wales 22 (Andrew Farrar, Garry Jack, Chris Mortimer, Royce Simmons tries; Michael O'Connor 3 goals); Queensland 16 (Greg Dowling, Gene Miles tries; Mal Meninga 4 goals)	Kevin Roberts	Lang Park	33,066	Royce Simmons
Tuesday, 10 June 1986	New South Wales 24 (Noel Cleal, Wayne Pearce, Andrew Farrar, Brett Kenny, Michel O'Connor tries; Michel O'Connor 2 goals); Queensland 20 (Dale Shearer, Ian French, Les Kiss, Bob Lindner tries; Mal Meninga 2 goals)	Barry Gomersall	Sydney Cricket Ground	40,707	Peter Sterling
Tuesday, 1 July 1986	New South Wales 18 (Wayne Pearce, Peter Tunks, Michael O'Connor tries; Michael O'Connor 3 goals); Queensland 16 (Gary Belcher, Greg Conescu, Les Kiss, Dale Shearer tries)	Kevin Roberts	Lang Park	21,097	Brett Kenny
Tuesday, 2 June 1987	New South Wales 20 (Michael O'Connor 2, Les Davidson, Mark McGaw tries; Michael O'Connor 2 goals); Queensland 16 (Dale Shearer, Tony Currie, Greg Dowling tries; Gary Belcher, Peter Jackson goals)	Mick Stone	Lang Park	33,411	Les Davidson
Tuesday, 16 June 1987	Queensland 12 (Dale Shearer, Greg Dowling, Colin Scott tries); New South Wales 6 (Andrew Farrar try; Michael O'Connor goal)	Barry Gomersall	Sydney Cricket Ground	42,048	Peter Sterling
Wednesday, 15 July 1987	Queensland 10 (Dale Shearer, Bob Lindner tries; Dale Shearer goal); New South Wales 8 (David Boyle try; Michael O'Connor 2 goals)	Barry Gomersall	Lang Park	32,602	Allan Langer
Tuesday, 17 May 1988	Queensland 26 (Allan Langer 2, Gary Belcher, Peter Jackson, Alan McIndoe tries; Gary Belcher 3 goals); New South Wales 18 (Mark McGaw, Andrew Ettingshausen, Michael O'Connor tries; Michael O'Connor 3 goals)	Barry Gomersall	Sydney Football Stadium	26,441	Allan Langer
Tuesday, 31 May 1988	Queensland 16 (Sam Backo, Allan Langer tries; Gary Belcher 4 goals); New South Wales 6 (Michael O'Connor try; Michael O'Connor goal)	Mick Stone	Lang Park	31,817	Sam Backo
Tuesday, 21 June 1988	Queensland 38 (Sam Backo 2, Gary Belcher, Brett French, Joe Kilroy, Allan Langer, Wally Lewis tries; Gary Belcher 5 goals); New South Wales 22 (Wayne Pearce, John Ferguson, Steve Hanson, Michael O'Connor tries; Michael O'Connor 3 goals)	Greg McCallum	Sydney Football Stadium	16,910	Sam Backo
Tuesday, 23 May 1989	Queensland 36 (Mal Meninga 2, Michael Hancock 2, Allan Langer, Alan McIndoe, Bob Lindner tries; Mal Meninga 4 goals); New South Wales 6 (Andrew Ettingshausen try; Laurie Daley goal)	Mick Stone	Lang Park	33,088	Martin Bella
Wednesday, 14 June 1989	Queensland 16 (Kerrod Walters, Wally Lewis, Michael Hancock tries; Mal Meninga, Gary Belcher goals); New South Wales 12 (Laurie Daley, Chris Johns tries; Greg Alexander 2 goals)	David Manson	Sydney Football Stadium	40,000	Wally Lewis
Wednesday, 28 June 1989	Queensland 36 (Dale Shearer 2, Gary Belcher, Tony Currie, Kerrod Walters, Michael Hancock, Alan McIndoe tries; Dale Shearer 4 goals); New South Wales 16 (David Trewhella, Bruce McGuire, Des Hasler tries; Michael O'Connor 2 goals)	Greg McCallum	Lang Park	33,260	Kerrod Walters
Wednesday, 9 May 1990	New South Wales 8 (Mark McGaw try; Michael O'Connor 2 goals); Queensland 0	David Manson	Sydney Football Stadium	41,235	Ben Elias
Wednesday, 30 May 1990	New South Wales 12 (Ricky Stuart, Brad Mackay tries; Rod Wishart 2 goals); Queensland 6 (Les Kiss try; Mal Meninga goal)	Greg McCallum	Olympic Park, Melbourne	25,800	Ricky Stuart
Wednesday, 13 June 1990	Queensland 14 (Peter Jackson, Gary Belcher tries; Gary Belcher 2, Wally Lewis goals); New South Wales 10 (Mark McGaw, Glenn Lazarus tries; Rod Wishart goal)	David Manson	Lang Park	31,416	Bob Linder
Wednesday, 8 May 1991	Queensland 6 (Mal Meninga try; Mal Meninga goal); New South Wales 4 (Laurie Daley try)	Bill Harrigan	Lang Park	32,400	Wally Lewis
Wednesday, 29 May 1991	New South Wales 14 (Mark McGaw, Chris Johns tries; Michael O'Connor 3 goals); Queensland 12 (Dale Shearer, Willie Carne tries; Mal Meninga 2 goals)	David Manson	Sydney Football Stadium	41,520	Steve Walters
Wednesday, 12 June 1991	Queensland 14 (Dale Shearer, Paul Hauff, Michael Hancock tries; Mal Meninga goal); New South Wales 12 (Chris Johns, Michael O'Connor, Des Hasler tries)	Bill Harrigan	Lang Park	33,226	Martin Bella
Wednesday, 6 May 1992	New South Wales 14 (Bradley Clyde, Craig Salvatori tries; Rod Wishart 3 goals); Queensland 6 (Allan Langer try; Mal Meninga goal)	David Manson	Sydney Football Stadium	40,039	Ben Elias
Wednesday, 20 May 1992	Queensland 5 (Billy Moore try; Allan Langer field goal); New South Wales 4 (Rod Wishart 2 goals)	Bill Harrigan	Lang Park	31,500	Bob Linder
Wednesday, 3 June 1992	New South Wales 16 (Andrew Ettingshausen, Ricky Stuart, John Cartwright tries; Tim Brasher 2 goals); Queensland 4 (Mal Meninga 2 goals)	Eddie Ward	Sydney Football Stadium	41,878	Ricky Stuart
Monday, 3 May 1993	New South Wales 14 (Ricky Stuart, Rod Wishart tries; Rod Wishart 3 goals); Queensland 10 (Willie Carne, Bob Linder tries; Mal Meninga goal)	Greg McCallum	Lang Park	33,000	Ricky Stuart
Monday, 17 May 1993	New South Wales 16 (Laurie Daley, Brad Mackay, Rod Wishart tries; Rod Wishart 2 goals); Queensland 12 (Mal Meninga, Kevin Walters tries; Dale Shearer, Adrian Brunker goals)	Eddie Ward	Sydney Football Stadium	41,895	Tim Brasher
Monday, 31 May 1993	Queensland 24 (Willie Carne 2, Bob Linder, Steve Walters tries; Mal Meninga 2, Julian O'Neill 2 goals); New South Wales 12 (Andrew Ettingshausen, Paul Harragon tries; Rod Wishart 2 goals)	Greg McCallum	Lang Park	31,500	Dale Shearer
Monday, 23 May 1994	Queensland 16 (Julian O'Neill, Willie Carne, Mark Coyne tries; Mal Meninga 2 goals); New South Wales 12 (Paul Harragon, Brad Mackay tries; Rod Wishart, Graham Mackay goals)	Bill Harrigan	Sydney Football Stadium	41,859	Willie Carne
Wednesday, 8 June 1994	New South Wales 14 (Glenn Lazarus, Paul McGregor tries; Tim Brasher 3 goals); Queensland 0	Graham Annesley	Melbourne Cricket Ground	87,161	Paul Harragon
Monday, 20 June 1994	New South Wales 27 (Brett Mullins, Bradley Clyde, Laurie Daley, Brad Fittler tries; Tim Brasher 4 goals; Ben Elias 2, Brad Fittler field goals); Queensland 12 (Steve Renouf, Andrew Gee tries Julian O'Neill 2 goals)	Bill Harrigan	Lang Park	40,665	Ben Elias
Monday, 15 May 1995	Queensland 2 (Wayne Bartrim goal); New South Wales 0	Eddie Ward	Sydney Football Stadium	39,841	Gary Larson
Wednesday, 31 May 1995	Queensland 20 (Brett Dallas, Mark Coyne, Adrian Lam tries; Wayne Bartrim 4 goals); New South Wales 12 (Brett Rodwell, Jim Serdaris tries; Rod Wishart 2 goals)	Eddie Ward	Melbourne Cricket Ground	52,994	Jason Smith
Monday, 12 June 1995	Queensland 24 (Brett Dallas, Jason Smith, Ben Ikin, Billy Moore tries; Wayne Bartrim 4 goals); New South Wales 16 (Tim Brasher, Adam Muir, Rod Wishart tries; Rod Wishart 2 goals)	David Manson	Lang Park	40,189	Adrian Lam
Monday, 20 May 1996	New South Wales 14 (Andrew Ettingshausen, Steve Menzies tries; Andrew Johns 3 Goals); Queensland 6 (Allan Langer try; Wayne Bartrim goal)	David Manson	Lang Park	39,348	Geoff Toovey
Monday, 3 June 1996	New South Wales 18 (Brett Mullins 2, Rod Wishart tries; Andrew Johns 3 goals); Queensland 6 (Steve Renouf try; Julian O'Neill goal)	David Manson	Sydney Football Stadium	41,955	Andrew Johns
Monday, 17 June 1996	New South Wales 15 (Andrew Ettingshausen, Brett Mullins tries; Andrew Johns 2, Rod Wishart goals; Brad Fittler field goal); Queensland 14 (Brett Dallas, Mark Coyne tries; Willie Carne 3 goals)	David Manson	Lang Park	38,217	Steve Menzies
Wednesday, 28 May 1997	New South Wales 8 (Paul McGregor try; Andrew Johns, Rod Wishart goals); Queensland 6 (Adrian Lam try; Wayne Bartrim goal)	Kelvin Jeffes	Lang Park	28,222	Geoff Toovey
Wednesday, 11 June 1997	New South Wales 15 (Jim Dymock, Ken McGuinness, Nik Kosef tries; John Simon goal; John Simon field goal); Queensland 14 (Brett Dallas, Robbie O'Davis, Matt Sing tries; Julian O'Neill goal)	David Manson	Melbourne Cricket Ground	25,105	Paul McGregor
Wednesday, 25 June 1997	Queensland 18 (Ben Ikin, Julian O'Neill, Mark Coyne tries; Julian O'Neill 3 goals); New South Wales 12 (Andrew Johns, Jamie Ainscough tries; John Simon, Andrew Johns goals)	Eddie Ward	Sydney Football Stadium	33,241	Gary Larson
Friday, 22 May 1998	Queensland 24 (Steve Price, Tonie Carroll, Allan Langer, Kevin Walters tries; Darren Lockyer 4 goals); New South Wales 23 (Laurie Daley, Tim Brasher, Steve Menzies, Rod Wishart, Brad Fittler tries; Andrew Johns goal; Andrew Johns field goal)	Bill Harrigan	Sydney Football Stadium	36,070	Allan Langer
Friday, 5 June 1998	New South Wales 26 (Paul McGregor 2, Tim Brasher, Adam MacDougall, Brad Fittler tries; Andrew Johns 3 goals); Queensland 10 (Wendell Sailor, Matt Sing tries; Darren Lockyer goal)	Bill Harrigan	Lang Park	40,447	Rodney Howe
Friday, 19 June 1998	Queensland 19 (Ben Ikin, Kevin Walters, Allan Langer tries; Darren Lockyer 2, Robbie O'Davis goals; Jason Smith field goal); New South Wales 4 (Ken McGuinness try)	Bill Harrigan	Sydney Football Stadium	38,952	Shane Webcke
Wednesday, 26 May 1999	Queensland 9 (Mat Rogers 4 goals; Mat Rogers field goal); New South Wales 8 (Anthony Mundine try; Ryan Girdler 2 goals)	Bill Harrigan	Lang Park	38,093	Jason Hetherington
Wednesday, 9 June 1999	New South Wales 12 (Laurie Daley, Robbie Ross tries; Ryan Girdler 2 goals); Queensland 8 (Mat Rogers try; Mat Rogers 2 goals)	Steve Clark	Stadium Australia	88,336	Laurie Daley
Wednesday, 23 June 1999	Queensland 10 (Paul Green, Darren Lockyer tries; Darren Lockyer goal) drew New South Wales 10 (Matt Geyer 2 tries; Ryan Girdler goal)	Steve Clark	Lang Park	39,371	Wendell Sailor
Wednesday, 10 May 2000	New South Wales 20 (Adam MacDougall 2, David Peachey, Ryan Girdler tries; Ryan Girdler 2 goals); Queensland 16 (Adrian Lam 2, Mat Rogers tries; Mat Rogers, Darren Lockyer goals)	Bill Harrigan	Stadium Australia	61,511	Adam MacDougall
Wednesday, 24 May 2000	New South Wales 28 (Scott Hill, David Furner, Shaun Timmins, Ryan Girdler, Brad Fittler tries; Ryan Girdler 4 goals); Queensland 10 (Gorden Tallis try; Mat Rogers 3 goals)	Bill Harrigan	Lang Park	38,796	Tim Brasher
Wednesday, 7 June 2000	New South Wales 56 (Ryan Girdler 3, Matt Gidley 2, Adam MacDougall, Andrew Johns, Adam Muir, Bryan Fletcher tries; Ryan Girdler 10 goals); Queensland 16 (Mat Rogers, Gorden Tallis, David Smith tries; Mat Rogers 2 goals)	Bill Harrigan	Stadium Australia	58,767	Ryan Girdler
Sunday, 6 May 2001	Queensland 34 (Carl Webb, John Buttigieg, John Doyle, Darren Lockyer, Darren Smith, Chris Walker tries; Darren Lockyer 5 goals); New South Wales 16 (Matt Gidley, Trent Barrett, Brad Fittler tries; Michael De Vere 2 goals)	Bill Harrigan	Lang Park	38,909	Gorden Tallis
Sunday, 10 June 2001	New South Wales 26 (Brad Fittler 2, Jamie Ainscough, Trent Barrett, Luke Ricketson tries; Ryan Girdler 3 goals); Queensland 8 (Chris Walker try; Darren Lockyer 2 goals)	Bill Harrigan	Stadium Australia	70,249	Trent Barrett
Sunday, 1 July 2001	Queensland 40 (Chris Walker 2, Darren Lockyer 2, Paul Bowman 2, Dane Carlaw, Allan Langer tries; Darren Lockyer 4 goals); New South Wales 14 (Ryan Girdler 2 tries; Ryan Girdler 3 goals)	Bill Harrigan	ANZ Stadium, Brisbane	49,441	Darren Lockyer
Wednesday, 22 May 2002	New South Wales 32 (Brett Hodgson, Jamie Lyon, Timana Tahu, Matt Gidley, Andrew Johns tries; Andrew Johns 4, Brett Hodgson goals; Andrew Johns, Trent Barrett field goals); Queensland 4 (Lote Tuqiri try)	Bill Harrigan	Stadium Australia	55,421	Andrew Johns
Wednesday, 5 June 2002	Queensland 26 (Lote Tuqiri 3, Dane Carlaw, Gorden Tallis tries; Lote Tuqiri 3 goals); New South Wales 18 (Braith Anasta, Shaun Timmins, Luke Ricketson tries Andrew Johns 3 goals)	Bill Harrigan	ANZ Stadium, Brisbane	47,989	Chris McKenna
Wednesday, 26 June 2002	Queensland 18 (Dane Carlaw, Shaun Berrigan, Lote Tuqiri, Shane Webcke tries; Lote Tuqiri goal) drew New South Wales 18 (Jason Moodie 2, Steve Menzies tries; Andrew Johns 3 goals)	Bill Harrigan	Stadium Australia	74,842	Allan Langer
Wednesday, 11 June 2003	New South Wales 25 (Anthony Minichiello 2, Andrew Johns, Craig Wing tries; Andrew Johns 4 goals; Andrew Johns field goal); Queensland 12 (Gorden Tallis, Darren Lockyer tries; Darren Lockyer 2 goals)	Bill Harrigan	Lang Park	52,429	Luke Bailey
Wednesday, 25 June 2003	New South Wales 27 (Timana Tahu 2, Ben Kennedy, Matt Gidley, Anthony Minichiello tries; Andrew Johns 3 goals; Andrew Johns field goal); Queensland 4 (Michael Crocker try)	Bill Harrigan	Stadium Australia	79,132	Andrew Johns
Wednesday, 16 July 2003	Queensland 36 (Matt Sing 3, Brent Tate 2, Cameron Smith, Michael Crocker tries; Josh Hannay 4 goals); New South Wales 6 (Timana Tahu try; Andrew Johns goal)	Bill Harrigan	Lang Park	52,130	Matt Sing
Wednesday, 26 May 2004	New South Wales 9 (Shaun Timmins try; Craig Fitzgibbon 2 goals; Shaun Timmins field goal); Queensland 8 (Brent Tate, Scott Prince tries)	Sean Hampstead	Stadium Australia	68,344	Shaun Timmons
Wednesday, 16 June 2004	Queensland 22 (Billy Slater 2, Dane Carlaw, Willie Tonga tries; Cameron Smith 2, Scott Prince goals); New South Wales 18 (Timana Tahu 2, Luke Rooney tries; Craig Fitzgibbon 3 goals)	Sean Hampstead	Lang Park	52,478	Billy Slater
Wednesday, 7 July 2004	New South Wales 36 (Mark Gasnier 2, Luke Rooney, Trent Barrett, Anthony Minichiello, Brad Fittler tries; Craig Fitzgibbon 5, Mark Gasnier goals); Queensland 14 (Billy Slater, Matt Bowen tries; Cameron Smith 3 goals)	Paul Simpkins	Stadium Australia	82,487	Craig Fitzgibbon
Wednesday, 25 May 2005	Queensland 24 (Ty Williams, Michael Crocker, Matt Bowen tries; Cameron Smith 5 goals; Darren Lockyer, Johnathan Thurston field goals); New South Wales 20 (Ben Kennedy, Luke Rooney, Mark Gasnier, Danny Buderus tries; Craig Fitzgibbon 2 goals)	Paul Simpkins	Lang Park	52,484	Steve Price
Wednesday, 15 June 2005	New South Wales 32 (Anthony Minichiello 2, Matt Cooper, Danny Buderus, Steve Menzies tries; Andrew Johns 3, Craig Fitzgibbon 3 goals); Queensland 22 (Petero Civoniceva, Brad Thorn, Billy Slater, Matt Bowen tries; Cameron Smith 3 goals)	Steve Clark	Stadium Australia	82,389	Andrew Johns
Wednesday, 6 July 2005	New South Wales 32 (Matt King 3, Braith Anasta, Mark Gasnier, Timana Tahu tries; Andrew Johns 3, Craig Fitzgibbon goals); Queensland 10 (Johnathan Thurston, Matt Bowen tries; Cameron Smith goal)	Paul Simpkins	Lang Park	52,436	Anthony Minichiello
Wednesday, 24 May 2006	New South Wales 17 (Brett Finch, Matt King, Willie Mason tries; Brett Hodgson 2 goals; Brett Finch field goal); Queensland 16 (Greg Inglis 2, Steve Bell tries; Johnathan Thurston 2 goals)	Sean Hampstead	Stadium Australia	72,773	Willie Mason
Wednesday, 14 June 2006	Queensland 30 (Adam Mogg 2, Carl Webb, Justin Hodges, Shaun Berrigan tries; Johnathan Thurston 5 goals); New South Wales 6 (Timana Tahu try; Brett Hodgson goal)	Steve Clark	Lang Park	52,468	Darren Lockyer
Wednesday, 5 July 2006	Queensland 16 (Adam Mogg, Brent Tate, Darren Lockyer tries; Clinton Schifcofske 2 goals); New South Wales 14 (Eric Grothe, Jr. 2, Matt King tries; Brett Hodgson goal)	Steve Clark	Docklands Stadium	54,833	Brent Tate
Wednesday, 23 May 2007	Queensland 25 (Greg Inglis 2, Darren Lockyer, Steve Price tries; Johnathan Thurston 4 goals; Johnathan Thurston field goal); New South Wales 18 (Matt Cooper, Jarryd Hayne, Nathan Hindmarsh tries; Jamie Lyon 3 goals)	Paul Simpkins	Lang Park	52,498	Johnathan Thurston
Wednesday, 13 June 2007	Queensland 10 (Greg Inglis, Steve Bell tries; Johnathan Thurston goal); New South Wales 6 (Brett Stewart try; Jamie Lyon goal)	Shayne Hayne	Stadium Australia	76,924	Cameron Smith
Wednesday, 4 July 2007	New South Wales 18 (Jarryd Hayne, Matt King, Hazem El Masri tries; Hazem El Masri 3 goals); Queensland 4 (Justin Hodges try)	Paul Simpkins	Lang Park	52,469	Greg Bird
Wednesday, 21 May 2008	New South Wales 18 (Anthony Quinn 2, Brett Stewart, Anthony Laffranchi tries; Craig Fitzgibbon goal); Queensland 10 (Brent Tate, Israel Folau tries; Johnathan Thurston goal)	Tony Archer	Stadium Australia	67,620	Greg Bird
Wednesday, 11 June 2008	Queensland 30 (Darius Boyd 2, Ben Hannant, Israel Folau tries; Johnathan Thurston 7 goals); New South Wales 0	Tony Archer	Lang Park	52,476	Greg Inglis
Wednesday, 2 July 2008	Queensland 16 (Israel Folau 2, Billy Slater tries; Johnathan Thurston 2 goals); New South Wales 10 (Matt Cooper try; Craig Fitzgibbon 3 goals)	Tony Archer	Stadium Australia	78,751	Israel Folau
Wednesday, 3 June 2009	Queensland 28 (Greg Inglis 2, Billy Slater, Johnathan Thurston, Darius Boyd tries; Johnathan Thurston 4 goals); New South Wales 18 (Ben Creagh, Craig Wing, Jarryd Hayne tries; Kurt Gidley 3 goals)	Tony Archer and Shayne Hayne	Docklands Stadium	50,967	Johnathan Thurston
Wednesday, 24 June 2009	Queensland 24 (Greg Inglis, Israel Folau, Darren Lockyer, Cameron Smith tries; Johnathan Thurston 4 goals); New South Wales 14 (Jarryd Hayne 2, David Williams tries; Kurt Gidley goal)	Tony Archer and Shayne Hayne	Stadium Australia	80,459	Sam Thaiday
Wednesday, 15 July 2009	New South Wales 28 (Ben Creagh 2, David Williams, Josh Morris tries; Michael Ennis 3, Kurt Gidley 3 goals); Queensland 16 (Dallas Johnson, Justin Hodges, Billy Slater tries; Johnathan Thurston 2 goals)	Tony Archer and Shayne Hayne	Lang Park	52,439	Anthony Watmough
Wednesday, 26 May 2010	Queensland 28 (Billy Slater, Darius Boyd, Greg Inglis, Darren Lockyer, Sam Thaiday tries; Johnathan Thurston 4 goals); New South Wales 24 (Jarryd Hayne, Anthony Watmough, Ben Creagh, Jamal Idris tries; Jamie Lyon 4 goals)	Tony Archer and Shayne Hayne	Stadium Australia	68,753	Johnathan Thurston
Wednesday, 16 June 2010	Queensland 34 (Israel Folau 2, Darius Boyd, Greg Inglis, Willie Tonga, Cooper Cronk tries; Johnathan Thurston 5 goals); New South Wales 6 (Brett White try; Michael Ennis goal)	Tony Archer and Shayne Hayne	Lang Park	52,452	Darren Lockyer
Wednesday, 7 July 2010	Queensland 23 (Darius Boyd, Billy Slater, Willie Tonga, Nate Myles tries; Johnathan Thurston 3 goals; Darren Lockyer field goal); New South Wales 18 (Kurt Gidley, Paul Gallen, Greg Bird tries; Michael Gordon 3 goals)	Tony Archer and Shayne Hayne	Stadium Australia	61,259	Billy Slater
Wednesday, 25 May 2011	Queensland 16 (Johnathan Thurston, Jharal Yow Yeh, Billy Slater tries; Johnathan Thurston 2 goals); New South Wales 12 (Mitchell Pearce, Michael Jennings tries; Jamie Soward 2 goals)	Tony Archer and Jared Maxwell	Lang Park	52,144	Cameron Smith
Wednesday, 15 June 2011	New South Wales 18 (Luke Lewis, Will Hopoate, Anthony Minichiello tries; Jamie Soward 3 goals); Queensland 8 (Cameron Smith try; Johnathan Thurston 2 goals)	Ben Cummins and Shayne Hayne	Stadium Australia	81,965	Paul Gallen
Wednesday, 6 July 2011	Queensland 34 (Greg Inglis 2, Cameron Smith, Billy Slater, Sam Thaiday, Jharal Yow Yeh tries; Johnathan Thurston 4, Cameron Smith goals); New South Wales 24 (Greg Bird, Jarryd Hayne, Anthony Minichiello, Akulia Uate tries; Jamie Soward 4 goals)	Tony Archer and Shayne Hayne	Lang Park	52,498	Cameron Smith
Wednesday, 23 May 2012	Queensland 18 (Darius Boyd 2, Greg Inglis tries; Johnathan Thurston 3 goals); New South Wales 10 (Akulia Uate, Michael Jennings tries; Todd Carney goal)	Ben Cummins and Matt Cecchin	Docklands Stadium	56,021	Nate Myles
Wednesday, 13 June 2012	New South Wales 16 (Brett Stewart 2, Josh Morris tries; Todd Carney 2 goals); Queensland 12 (Ben Hannant, Greg Inglis tries; Johnathan Thurston 2 goals)	Tony Archer and Ben Cummins	Stadium Australia	83,110	Greg Bird
Wednesday, 4 July 2012	Queensland 21 (Darius Boyd, Justin Hodges, Johnathan Thurston tries; Johnathan Thurston 4 goals; Cooper Cronk field goal); New South Wales 20 (Brett Morris, Josh Morris, Brett Stewart tries; Todd Carney 4 goals)	Ben Cummins and Tony Archer	Lang Park	52,437	Johnathan Thurston
Wednesday, 5 June 2013	New South Wales 14 (Jarryd Hayne, Michael Jennings tries; James Maloney 3 goals); Queensland 6 (Darius Boyd try; Cameron Smith goal)	Shayne Hayne and Ashley Klein	Stadium Australia	80,380	Luke Lewis
Wednesday, 26 June 2013	Queensland 26 (Darius Boyd 2, Greg Inglis, Sam Thaiday tries; Johnathan Thurston 5 goals); New South Wales 6 (Brett Morris try; James Maloney goal)	Shayne Hayne and Ashley Klein	Lang Park	51,690	Cameron Smith
Wednesday, 17 July 2013	Queensland 12 (Johnathan Thurston, Justin Hodges tries; Johnathan Thurston 2 goals); New South Wales 10 (James McManus, Trent Merrin tries; James Maloney goal)	Shanye Hayne and Ben Cummins	Stadium Australia	83,813	Brent Tate
Wednesday, 28 May 2014	New South Wales 12 (Brett Morris, Jarryd Hayne tries; Trent Hodkinson 2 goals); Queensland 8 (Darius Boyd 2 tries)	Shayne Hayne and Ben Cummins	Lang Park	52,111	Jarryd Hayne
Wednesday, 18 June 2014	New South Wales 6 (Trent Hodkinson try; Trent Hodkinson goal); Queensland 4 (Johnathan Thurston 2 goals)	Shayne Hayne and Ben Cummins	Stadium Australia	83,421	Paul Gallen
Wednesday, 9 July 2014	Queensland 32 (Cameron Smith, Billy Slater, Darius Boyd, Aidan Guerra, Cooper Cronk tries; Johnathan Thurston 6 goals); New South Wales 8 (Josh Dugan try; Trent Hodkinson 2 goals)	Ben Cummins and Gerard Sutton	Lang Park	50,155	Corey Parker
Wednesday, 27 May 2015	Queensland 11 (Cooper Cronk, Will Chambers tries; Johnathan Thurston goal; Cooper Cronk field goal); New South Wales 10 (Josh Morris, Beau Scott tries; Trent Hodkinson goal)	Gerard Sutton and Ben Cummins	Stadium Australia	80,122	Cameron Smith
Wednesday, 17 June 2015	New South Wales 26 (Michael Jennings, Josh Morris, Aaron Woods, Josh Dugan tries; Trent Hodkinson 5 goals); Queensland 18 (Matt Scott, Greg Inglis, Matt Gillett tries; Johnathan Thurston 3 goals)	Gerard Sutton and Ben Cummins	Melbourne Cricket Ground	91,513	Michael Jennings
Wednesday, 8 July 2015	Queensland 52 (Dane Gagai, Josh Papalii, Greg Inglis, Matt Gillett, Michael Morgan, Darius Boyd, Will Chambers, Aidan Guerra tries; Johnathan Thurston 9, Justin Hodges goals); New South Wales 6 (Michael Jennings try; Trent Hodkinson goal)	Gerard Sutton and Ben Cummins	Lang Park	52,500	Johnathan Thurston
Wednesday, 1 June 2016	Queensland 6 (Dane Gagai try; Johnathon Thurston goal); New South Wales 4 (Boyd Cordner try)	Gerard Sutton and Ben Cummins	Stadium Australia	80,251	Matt Gillett
Wednesday, 22 June 2016	Queensland 26 (Dane Gagai 3, Corey Oates tries; Johnathon Thurston 5 goals); New South Wales 16 (Tyson Frizell, James Maloney tries; Adam Reynolds 3, James Maloney goals)	Gerard Sutton and Ben Cummins	Lang Park	52,293	Cameron Smith
Wednesday, 13 July 2016	New South Wales 18 (Tyson Frizell, David Fifita, Michael Jennings tries; James Maloney 2, Paul Gallen goals); Queensland 14 (Greg Inglis, Gavin Cooper, Darius Boyd tries; Johnathan Thurston goal)	Gerard Sutton and Ben Cummins	Stadium Australia	61,267	James Maloney
Wednesday, 31 May 2017	New South Wales 28 (James Maloney, Mitchell Pearce, James Tedesco, Andrew Fifita, Jarryd Hayne tries; James Maloney 4 goals); Queensland 4 (Corey Oates try)	Matt Cecchin and Gerard Sutton	Lang Park	50,390	Andrew Fifita
Wednesday, 21 June 2017	Queensland 18 (Dane Gagai 2, Valentine Holmes tries; Johnathan Thurston 3 goals); New South Wales 16 (Jarryd Hayne, Brett Morris, Mitchell Pearce tries; James Maloney 2 goals)	Matt Cecchin and Gerard Sutton	Stadium Australia	82,259	Josh Jackson
Wednesday, 12 July 2017	Queensland 22 (Valentine Holmes 3, Jarrod Wallace tries; Cameron Smith 3 goals); New South Wales 6 (Josh Dugan try; James Maloney goal)	Matt Cecchin and Gerard Sutton	Lang Park	52,540	Cameron Smith
Wednesday, 6 June 2018	New South Wales 22 (James Tedesco, Latrell Mitchell, Tom Trbojevic, Josh Addo-Carr tries; James Maloney 3 goals); Queensland 12 (Valentine Holmes, Dane Gagai tries; Valentine Holmes 2 goals)	Gerard Sutton and Ashley Klein	Melbourne Cricket Ground	87,122	James Tedesco
Sunday, 24 June 2018	New South Wales 18 (Josh Addo-Carr, Boyd Cordner, Latrell Mitchell tries; James Maloney 3 goals); Queensland 14 (Valentine Holmes, Dane Gagai, Will Chambers tries; Valentine Holmes goal)	Gerard Sutton and Ashley Klein	Stadium Australia	82,223	Boyd Cordner
Wednesday, 11 July 2018	Queensland 18 (Valentine Holmes 2, Daly Cherry-Evans tries; Valentine Holmes 3 goals); New South Wales 12 (Tom Trbojevic, James Tedesco tries; Nathan Cleary 2 goals)	Gerard Sutton and Ashley Klein	Lang Park	51,214	Billy Slater
Wednesday, 5 June 2019	Queensland 18 (Dane Gagai 2, Corey Oates tries; Kalyn Ponga 3 goals); New South Wales 14 (Josh Morris, Jake Trbojevic tries; Nathan Cleary 3 goals)	Gerard Sutton and Ashley Klein	Lang Park	52,191	Dane Gagai
Sunday, 23 June 2019	New South Wales 38 (Tom Trbojevic 3, Josh-Addo Carr 2, Tyson Frizell tries; James Maloney 5, Nathan Cleary 2 goals); Queensland 6 (Will Chambers try; Kalyn Ponga goal)	Gerard Sutton and Ashley Klein	Perth Stadium	59,721	Jake Trbojevic
Wednesday, 10 July 2019	New South Wales 26 (James Tedesco 2, Paul Vaughan, Damian Cook tries; James Maloney 5 goals); Queensland 20 (Felise Kaufusi, Josh McGuire, Josh Papalii tries; Ethan Lowe 4 goals)	Gerard Sutton and Ashley Klein	Stadium Australia	82,565	James Tedesco
Wednesday, 4 November 2020	Queensland 18 (AJ Brimson, Xavier Coates, Cameron Munster tries; Daly Cherry-Evans 3 goals); New South Wales 14 (Josh Addo-Carr 2, Damien Cook tries; Nathan Cleary goal)	Gerard Sutton	Adelaide Oval	25,218	Daly Cherry-Evans
Wednesday, 11 November 2020	New South Wales 34 (Josh Addo-Carr 2, Cody Walker, James Tedesco, Jack Wighton, Daniel Tupou tries; Nathan Cleary 5 goals); Queensland 10 (Xavier Coates, Josh Papalii tries; Valentine Holmes goal)	Gerard Sutton	Stadium Australia	36,212	Nathan Cleary
Wednesday, 18 November 2020	Queensland 20 (Valentine Holmes, Edrick Lee, Harry Grant tries; Valentine Holmes 4 goals); New South Wales 14 (James Tedesco, Daniel Tupou tries; Nathan Cleary 3 goals)	Gerard Sutton	Lang Park	49,155	Cameron Munster
Wednesday, 9 June 2021	New South Wales 50 (Tom Trbojevic 3, Latrell Mitchell 2, Brian To'o 2, Daniel Saifiti tries; Nathan Cleary 8, Latrell Mitchell goals); Queensland 6 (Kurt Capewell try; Valentine Holmes goal)	Gerard Sutton	North Queensland Stadium	27,533	Tom Trbojevic
Sunday, 27 June 2021	New South Wales 26 (Josh Addo-Carr 2, Latrell Mitchell, Tom Trbojevic tries; Nathan Cleary 5 goals); Queensland 0	Gerard Sutton	Lang Park	52,273	James Tedesco
Wednesday, 14 July 2021	Queensland 20 (Ben Hunt 2, Hamiso Tabuai-Fidow tries; Valentine Holmes 2, Daly Cherry-Evans 2 goals); New South Wales 18 (Latrell Mitchell, Jack Wighton, Apisai Koroisau tries; Nathan Cleary 3 goals)	Gerard Sutton	Robina Stadium	26,307	Ben Hunt
Wednesday, 8 June 2022	Queensland 16 (Dane Gagai, Daly Cherry-Evans, Valentine Holmes tries; Valentine Holmes 2 goals); New South Wales 10 (Jack Wighton, Cameron Murray tries; Nathan Cleary goal)	Ashley Klein	Stadium Australia	80,512	Cameron Munster
Sunday, 26 June 2022	New South Wales 44 (Nathan Cleary 2, Matt Burton, Brian To'o, Daniel Tupou, Jarome Luai, Angus Crichton tries; Nathan Cleary 8 goals); Queensland 12 (Felise Kaufusi, Cameron Munster tries; Valentine Holmes 2 goals)	Ashley Klein	Perth Stadium	59,358	Nathan Cleary
Wednesday, 13 July 2022	Queensland 22 (Valentine Holmes, Kurt Capewell, Kalyn Ponga, Ben Hunt tries; Valentine holmes 4 goals); New South Wales 12 (Jarome Luai, Jacob Saifiti tries; Nathan Cleary 2 goals)	Ashley Klein	Lang Park	52,385	Kalyn Ponga
Wednesday, 31 May 2023	Queensland 26 (Hamiso Tabuai-Fidow, Selwyn Cobbo, Cameron Munster tries; Valentine Holmes 3 goals); New South Wales 18 (Liam Martin, Apisai Koroisau, Stephen Crichton tries; Nathan Cleary 3 goals)	Ashley Klein	Adelaide Oval	48,613	Reuben Cotter
Wednesday, 21 June 2023	Queensland 32 (Valentine Holmes, Murray Taulagi, Hamiso Tabuai-Fidow, Xavier Coates, Jeremiah Nanai tries; Valentine Holmes 4 goals); New South Wales 6 (Damien Cook try; Stephen Crichton goal)	Ashley Klein	Lang Park	52,433	Lindsay Collins
Wednesday, 12 July 2023	New South Wales 24 (Bradman Best 2, Brian To'o, Josh Addo-Carr tries; Stephen Crichton 4 goals); Queensland 10 (David Fifita, Hamiso Tabuai-Fidow tries; Valentine Holmes goal)	Ashley Klein	Stadium Australia	75,342	Cody Walker
Wednesday, 5 June 2024	New South Wales 10 (James Tedesco, Zac Lomax tries; Nicho Hynes goal) Queensland 38 (Hamiso Tabuai-Fidow 3, Ben Hunt 2, Xavier Coates; Valentine Holmes 6 goals)	Ashley Klein	Stadium Australia	77,214	Daly Cherry-Evans
Wednesday, 26 June 2024	New South Wales 38 (Brian To'o 2, Zac Lomax 2, Liam Martin, Latrell Mitchell, Dylan Edwards tries; Zac Lomax 5 goals) Queensland 18 (Jeremiah Nanai, Hamiso Tabuai-Fidow, Murray Taulagi tries; Valentine Holmes 3 goals)	Ashley Klein	Melbourne Cricket Ground	90,084	Mitchell Moses
Wednesday, 17 July 2024	New South Wales 14 (Bradman Best, Mitchell Moses tries; Zac Lomax 3 goals) Queensland 4 (Valentine Holmes 2 goals)	Ashley Klein	Lang Park	52,457	Dylan Edwards
Wednesday, 28 May 2025	New South Wales 18 (Zac Lomax 2, Brian To'o, Dylan Edwards tries; Nathan Cleary 1 goal) Queensland 6 (Xavier Coates try; Valentine Holmes 1 goal)	Ashley Klein	Lang Park	52,483	Payne Haas
Wednesday, 18 June 2025	Queensland 26 (Hamiso Tabuai-Fidow 2, Cameron Munster, Kurt Capewell tries; Valentine Holmes 5 goals) New South Wales 24 (Brian To'o 3, Stephen Crichton, Angus Crichton tries; Zac Lomax 2 goals)	Ashley Klein	Perth Stadium	57,023	Cameron Munster
Wednesday, 9 July 2025	Queensland 24 (Tom Dearden 2, Xavier Coates, Harry Grant tries; Valentine Holmes 4 goals) New South Wales 12 (Stephen Crichton, Brian To'o tries; Zac Lomax 2 goals)	Ashley Klein	Stadium Australia	80,256	Tom Dearden
Wednesday, 27 May 2026	New South Wales 22 (Hudson Young, Ethan Strange, Nathan Cleary, James Tedesco tries; Nathan Cleary 3 goals) Queensland 20 (Robert Toia, Thomas Flegler, Hamiso Tabuai-Fidow tries; Sam Walker 4 goals)	Ashley Klein	Stadium Australia	79,186	Nathan Cleary
Wednesday, 17 June 2026	Queensland 44 (Selwyn Cobbo 3, Trent Loiero, Jojo Fifita, Hamiso Tabuai-Fidow, Lindsay Collins tries; Sam Walker 8 goals) New South Wales 24 (Mark Nawaqanitawase 2, Kotoni Staggs, Mitchell Barnett tries; Nathan Cleary 4 goals)	Ashley Klein	Melbourne Cricket Ground	91,671	Sam Walker
Wednesday, 8 July 2026	New South Wales 30 (Nathan Cleary 2, Cameron Murray, Bradman Best, Hudson Young tries; Nathan Cleary 5 goals) Queensland 12 (Hamiso Tabuai-Fidow, Selwyn Cobbo, Jojo Fifita tries)	Ashley Klein	Lang Park	52,452	Nathan Cleary

=== One-off matches ===
The matches in 1980 and 1981 were one off experimental matches after New South Wales had already won the interstate series in both years. Both games count toward official statistics, but are not considered series.

After Queensland had won the 1987 State of Origin series 2–1, a further game was played in Long Beach, California to showcase rugby league to the American public. On 15 July 2003 the Australian Rugby League announced that this game was to be classified as an "official match" and that the match would count towards the players' individual statistics and overall match win–loss–draw records. However, the match does not count towards the series win–loss–draw record and the 1987 series still remains a 2–1 win to Queensland.

Date	Details	Referee(s)	Ground	Crowd	Man of the Match
Tuesday, 8 July 1980	Queensland 20 (Kerry Boustead, Chris Close tries; Mal Meninga 7 goals); New South Wales 10 (G. Brentnall, Tommy Raudonikis tries; Mick Cronin 2 goals)	Billy Thompson	Lang Park	33,210	Chris Close
Tuesday, 28 July 1981	Queensland 22 (Mal Meninga, Wally Lewis, Brad Backer, Chris Close tries; Mal Meninga 5 goals); New South Wales 15 (Eric Grothe, Sr. 2, Mick Cronin tries; Mick Cronin 3 goals)	Kevin Steele	Lang Park	25,613	Chris Close
Thursday, 6 August 1987	New South Wales 30 (Mark McGaw, Jonathan Docking, Andrew Ettingshausen, Michael O'Connor, Cliff Lyons tries; Michael O'Connor 5 goals); Queensland 18 (Dale Shearer, Tony Currie, Gene Miles tries; Dale Shearer 3 goals)	Mick Stone	Veterans Memorial Stadium	12,432	Peter Sterling

=== Super League ===
New South Wales and Queensland played two matches against each other under State of Origin selection rules using players from the Super League (Australia) competition. These matches were not sanctioned by the Australian Rugby League and are not counted as official State of Origin series matches. The Tri-series also included both sides playing a game against New Zealand.

Date	Details	Referee(s)	Ground	Crowd	Man of the Match
Friday, 11 April 1997	New South Wales 38 (Andrew Ettingshausen 3, Ken Nagas 2, David Peachey, Greg Alexander tries; Ryan Girdler 5 goals); Queensland 10 (Wendell Sailor, Peter Ryan tries; Mat Rogers goal)	Bill Harrigan	Sydney Football Stadium	26,731	Greg Alexander
Monday, 19 May 1997	New South Wales 23 (Brett Mullins 3, Matthew Ryan tries; David Furner 3 goals; Noel Goldthorpe field goal); Queensland 22 (Steve Renouf 2, Tonie Carroll, Michael Hancock tries; Mat Rogers 2, Darren Lockyer goals)	Bill Harrigan	ANZ Stadium, Brisbane	35,570	

== Statistics ==
=== Series ===
- Earliest start: 3 May (1993)
- Latest finish: 18 November (2020)
- Largest aggregate crowd: 224,135 (2015)
  - With 2 games in Queensland: 187,374 (2005)
- Smallest crowd: 67,003 (1982)
- Series won by QLD: 25
- Series won by NSW: 18
- Series drawn: 2

=== Matches ===
- Largest crowd: 91,671 at Melbourne Cricket Ground (Match 2, 2026)
- Smallest crowd: 16,559 at Lang Park (match 3, 1984), 12,439 at Veteran's Stadium, Los Angeles, United States (1987)
- Most points scored: 72 - New South Wales d. Queensland 56–16 (match 3, 2000)
- Fewest points scored: 2 - Queensland d. New South Wales 2–0 (match 1, 1995)
- Total points scored: 2,086 - Queensland, - 2,004 New South Wales
- Most consecutive series wins: 8 - Queensland (2006 - 2013)
- New South Wales wins: 62
- Queensland wins: 70
- Drawn matches: 2
- Largest winning margin: 46 - Queensland d. New South Wales 52–6 (Match 3, 2015)
- Highest score: 56 - New South Wales d. Queensland 56–16 (Match 3, 2000)
- Series decider wins in NSW by QLD: 5 - 1998, 2002, 2008, 2013, 2025
- Series decider wins in QLD by NSW: 4 - 1994, 2005, 2024, 2026
- QLD Series wins 3-0: 4 - 1988, 1989, 1995, 2010
- NSW Series wins 3-0: 3 - 1986, 1996, 2000

=== Grounds ===
Before 1988, Queensland hosted two matches every year, while in 2021 all three matches were held in Queensland due to COVID-19 restrictions. From 1988 to 2017, either New South Wales or Queensland usually hosted two of the three matches on a rotational basis, except for 1990, 1994, 1995, 1997, 2006, 2009, and 2015 when a game was held in Melbourne. Since 2018, one match per year has been held in either Melbourne, Adelaide, or Perth on a rotational basis. The following venues have hosted State of Origin matches since 1980.

Venue	City	Number of games	Highest crowd	Lowest crowd
Lang Park	Brisbane	62	52,540	16,559
Stadium Australia	Sydney	34	88,336	36,212
Sydney Football Stadium	Sydney	14	41,955	16,910
Melbourne Cricket Ground	Melbourne	7	91,671	25,105
Sydney Cricket Ground	Sydney	6	42,048	20,242
Docklands Stadium	Melbourne	3	56,021	50,967
Perth Stadium	Perth	3	59,721	57,023
QSAC	Brisbane	2	49,441	47,989
Adelaide Oval	Adelaide	2	48,613	25,218
North Queensland Stadium	Townsville	1	27,533	-
Robina Stadium	Gold Coast	1	26,307	-
Olympic Park Stadium	Melbourne	1	25,800	–
Veterans Memorial Stadium	Long Beach, California, US	1	12,439	–

=== Players ===
==== Individual records ====
Most tries in a match: 3 – Chris Anderson (Game 3, 1983), Kerry Boustead (Game 1, 1984), Ryan Girdler (Game 3, 2000), Lote Tuqiri (Game 2, 2002), Matt Sing (Game 3, 2003), Matt King (Game 3, 2005), Dane Gagai (Game 2, 2016), Valentine Holmes (Game 3, 2017), Tom Trbojevic (Game 2, 2019), Tom Trbojevic (Game 1, 2021), Hamiso Tabuai-Fidow (Game 1, 2024), Brian To'o (Game 2, 2025), Selwyn Cobbo (Game 2, 2026)
Most goals in a match: 10 – Ryan Girdler (Game 3, 2000)
Most field goals in a match: 2 – Ben Elias (Game 3, 1994)
Most points in a match: 32 – Ryan Girdler (Game 3, 2000)
Most appearances: 42 – Cameron Smith (2003–2017)
Most consecutive matches: 36 – Johnathan Thurston (Game 1, 2005 – Game 3, 2016)
Most tries in State of Origin career: 18 – Greg Inglis (2006–2018)
Most points in State of Origin career: 212 (5 tries, 102 goals, 2 field goals) – Johnathan Thurston (2005–2017)
Oldest player: Daly Cherry-Evans (36 years and 97 days – Game 1, 2025)
Youngest player: Ben Ikin (18 years and 83 days – Game 1, 1995)
Most wins as a player: 27 – Cameron Smith (2003–2017)

==== Most appearances ====
Queensland

- 42 – Cameron Smith (2003–2017)
- 37 – Johnathan Thurston (2005–2017)
- 36 – Darren Lockyer (1998–2007, 2009–2011)
- 34 – Allan Langer (1987–1994, 1996, 1998, 2001–2002)
- 33 – Petero Civoniceva (2001–2012)
- 32 – Mal Meninga (1980–1986, 1989–1994)
- 32 – Nate Myles (2006–2017)
- 32 – Greg Inglis (2006–2018)
- 31 – Wally Lewis (1980–1991)
- 31 – Billy Slater (2004–2005, 2008–2015, 2017)
- 29 – Sam Thaiday (2006–2017)
- 28 – Steve Price (1998–2000, 2002–2009)
- 28 – Darius Boyd (2008–2017)
- 26 – Dale Shearer (1985–1987, 1989–1993, 1995–1996)
- 26 – Daly Cherry-Evans (2013–2015, 2018–2025)
- 25 – Bob Lindner (1984–1993)

New South Wales

- 31 – Brad Fittler (1990–1996, 1998–2001, 2004)
- 27 – Andrew Ettingshausen (1987–1994, 1996, 1998)
- 26 – James Tedesco (2016–2026)
- 24 – Paul Gallen (2006–2016)
- 23 – Laurie Daley (1989–1994, 1996, 1998–1999)
- 23 – Andrew Johns (1995–2000, 2002–2003, 2005)
- 22 – Rod Wishart (1990–1998)
- 22 – Jarryd Hayne (2007–2014, 2017)
- 21 – Tim Brasher (1992–1998, 2000)
- 21 – Steven Menzies (1995–1998, 2001–2002, 2005–2006)
- 21 – Danny Buderus (2002–2008)
- 20 – Paul Harragon (1992–1998)
- 20 – Nathan Cleary (2018–2023, 2025–2026)
- 20 – Isaah Yeo (2020–2026)
- 19 – Michael O'Connor (1985–1991)
- 19 – Ben Elias (1985, 1988, 1990–1994)
- 19 – Glenn Lazarus (1989–1994, 1996, 1998–1999)
- 19 – Payne Haas (2019–2026)

==== Man of the Match awards ====
Player	State	Number of awards
Wally Lewis	Queensland	8
Cameron Smith	Queensland	7
Johnathan Thurston	Queensland	5
Peter Sterling	New South Wales	4
Allan Langer	Queensland	4
Andrew Johns	New South Wales	4
Nathan Cleary	New South Wales	4
Ricky Stuart	New South Wales	3
Ben Elias	New South Wales	3
Darren Lockyer	Queensland	3
Greg Bird	New South Wales	3
James Tedesco	New South Wales	3
Cameron Munster	Queensland	3
Chris Close	Queensland	2
Sam Backo	Queensland	2
Martin Bella	Queensland	2
Bob Lindner	Queensland	2
Geoff Toovey	New South Wales	2
Gary Larson	Queensland	2
Tim Brasher	New South Wales	2
Billy Slater	Queensland	2
Brent Tate	Queensland	2
Paul Gallen	New South Wales	2
Daly Cherry-Evans	Queensland	2
Mal Meninga	Queensland	1
Rod Morris	Queensland	1
Steve Mortimer	New South Wales	1
Peter Wynn	New South Wales	1
Wally Fullerton-Smith	Queensland	1
Royce Simmons	New South Wales	1
Brett Kenny	New South Wales	1
Les Davidson	New South Wales	1
Kerrod Walters	Queensland	1
Steve Walters	Queensland	1
Dale Shearer	Queensland	1
Willie Carne	Queensland	1
Paul Harragon	New South Wales	1
Jason Smith	Queensland	1
Adrian Lam	Queensland	1
Steve Menzies	New South Wales	1
Paul McGregor	New South Wales	1
Rodney Howe	New South Wales	1
Shane Webcke	Queensland	1
Jason Hetherington	Queensland	1
Laurie Daley	New South Wales	1
Wendell Sailor	Queensland	1
Adam MacDougall	New South Wales	1
Ryan Girdler	New South Wales	1
Gorden Tallis	Queensland	1
Trent Barrett	New South Wales	1
Chris McKenna	Queensland	1
Luke Bailey	New South Wales	1
Matt Sing	Queensland	1
Shaun Timmins	New South Wales	1
Craig Fitzgibbon	New South Wales	1
Steve Price	Queensland	1
Anthony Minichiello	New South Wales	1
Willie Mason	New South Wales	1
Greg Inglis	Queensland	1
Israel Folau	Queensland	1
Sam Thaiday	Queensland	1
Anthony Watmough	New South Wales	1
Nate Myles	Queensland	1
Luke Lewis	New South Wales	1
Jarryd Hayne	New South Wales	1
Corey Parker	Queensland	1
Michael Jennings	New South Wales	1
Matt Gillett	Queensland	1
Andrew Fifita	New South Wales	1
Josh Jackson	New South Wales	1
Boyd Cordner	New South Wales	1
Dane Gagai	Queensland	1
Jake Trbojevic	New South Wales	1
Tom Trbojevic	New South Wales	1
Ben Hunt	Queensland	1
Kalyn Ponga	Queensland	1
Reuben Cotter	Queensland	1
Lindsay Collins	Queensland	1
Cody Walker	New South Wales	1
Dylan Edwards	New South Wales	1
Payne Haas	New South Wales	1
Tom Dearden	Queensland	1
Sam Walker	Queensland	1

==== Wally Lewis Medal ====
From 1992 to 2003 the Wally Lewis Medal was awarded by the Queensland Rugby League for the Queensland player of the series. Since 2004 it has been awarded to the player of the series, irrespective of state. The following players have been awarded the Wally Lewis Medal for player of the series.

Year	Player	State
2004	Craig Fitzgibbon	New South Wales
2005	Anthony Minichiello	New South Wales
2006	Darren Lockyer	Queensland
2007	Cameron Smith	Queensland
2008	Johnathan Thurston	Queensland
2009	Greg Inglis	Queensland
2010	Billy Slater	Queensland
2011	Cameron Smith	Queensland
2012	Nate Myles	Queensland
2013	Cameron Smith	Queensland
2014	Paul Gallen	New South Wales
2015	Corey Parker	Queensland
2016	Cameron Smith	Queensland
2017	Dane Gagai	Queensland
2018	Billy Slater	Queensland
2019	James Tedesco	New South Wales
2020	Cameron Munster	Queensland
2021	Tom Trbojevic	New South Wales
2022	Patrick Carrigan	Queensland
2023	Reuben Cotter	Queensland
2024	Angus Crichton	New South Wales
2025	Tom Dearden	Queensland
2026	Nathan Cleary	New South Wales

==== Ron McAuliffe Medal ====
The following players have been awarded the Ron McAuliffe Medal for Queensland player of the series. From 1992 to 2003, the award was the "Wally Lewis Medal"; however, after 2003, this medal was dedicated to the player of the series from both teams, and thus the award for Queensland Player of the Series was awarded with the "Ron McAuliffe" Medal.

Year	Player
1992	Allan Langer
1993	Bob Lindner
1994	Billy Moore
1995	Gary Larson
1996	Allan Langer
1997	Robbie O'Davis
1998	Allan Langer
1999	Jason Hetherington
2000	Darren Smith
2001	Darren Lockyer
2002	Shane Webcke
2003	Darren Lockyer
2004	Steve Price
2005	Cameron Smith
2006	Darren Lockyer
2007	Cameron Smith
2008	Petero Civoniceva
2009	Greg Inglis
2010	Sam Thaiday
2011	Petero Civoniceva
2012	Nate Myles
2013	Cameron Smith
2014	Nate Myles
2015	Cameron Smith
2016	Darius Boyd
2017	Josh McGuire
2018	Billy Slater
2019	Ben Hunt
2020	Jake Friend
2021	Ben Hunt
2022	Patrick Carrigan
2023	Reuben Cotter
2024	Tom Dearden
2025	Tom Dearden
2026	Selwyn Cobbo

==== Brad Fittler Medal ====
The following players have been awarded the Brad Fittler Medal for New South Wales player of the series.

Year	Player
2005	Matt King
2006	Steve Menzies
2007	Jarryd Hayne
2008	Danny Buderus
2009	Jarryd Hayne
2010	Kurt Gidley
2011	Paul Gallen
2012	Robbie Farah
2013	Greg Bird
2014	Jarryd Hayne & Ryan Hoffman
2015	Josh Dugan
2016	Josh Jackson
2017	David Klemmer
2018	James Tedesco
2019	James Tedesco
2020	Nathan Cleary
2021	Tom Trbojevic
2022	James Tedesco
2023	Brian To'o
2024	Angus Crichton
2025	Brian To'o
2026	Nathan Cleary

==== New South Wales captains ====
Years	Name	Matches
2011–2016	Paul Gallen	16
2004–2008	Danny Buderus	15
1995–1996, 1999–2001	Brad Fittler	14
1992–1994, 1998–1999	Laurie Daley	13
2020–2023	James Tedesco	11
1985–1988	Wayne Pearce	10
2017–2020	Boyd Cordner	10
2002–2003	Andrew Johns	6
1990–1991	Ben Elias	6
2025–2026	Isaah Yeo	6
1982–1983	Max Krilich	5
2009–2010	Kurt Gidley	5
1984–1985	Steve Mortimer	3
1989	Gavin Miller	3
1997	Geoff Toovey	3
1983–84	Ray Price	3
2024	Jake Trbojevic	3
2013, 2015	Robbie Farah	2
1980	Tommy Raudonikis	1
1981	Steve Rogers	1
2010	Trent Barrett	1

==== Queensland captains ====
Years	Name	Matches
1981–1991	Wally Lewis	29
2001, 2004–2007, 2009–2011	Darren Lockyer	22
2008, 2012–2017	Cameron Smith	21
2019–2025	Daly Cherry-Evans	19
1992–1994	Mal Meninga	9
1997, 1999–2000	Adrian Lam	8
2001–2003	Gorden Tallis	7
1996, 1998	Allan Langer	5
2025–2026	Cameron Munster	5
1995–1996	Trevor Gillmeister	4
1988, 1990	Paul Vautin	2
2018	Greg Inglis	2
1980	Arthur Beetson	1
1999	Kevin Walters	1
2004	Shane Webcke	1
2018	Billy Slater	1

=== Coaches ===
==== New South Wales ====
Name	Won	Lost	Draw
Ted Glossop (1980–1981, 1983)	1	4	0
Frank Stanton (1982, 1984)	2	4	0
Terry Fearnley (1985)	2	1	0
Ron Willey (1986–1987)	5	2	0
John Peard (1988)	0	3	0
Jack Gibson (1989–1990)	2	4	0
Tim Sheens (1991)	1	2	0
Phil Gould (1992–1996, 2002–2004)	14	9	1
Tom Raudonikis (1997–1998)	3	3	0
Wayne Pearce (1999–2001)	5	3	1
Ricky Stuart (2005, 2011–2012)	4	5	0
Graham Murray (2006–2007)	2	4	0
Craig Bellamy (2008–2010)	2	7	0
Laurie Daley (2013–2017, 2025–2026)	9	12	0
Brad Fittler (2018–2023)	9	9	0
Michael Maguire (2024)	2	1	0
Matt King (2027)	0	0	0

==== Queensland ====
Name	Won	Lost	Draw
John MacDonald (1980)	1	0	0
Arthur Beetson (1981–1984, 1989–1990)	11	5	0
Des Morris (1985)	1	2	0
Wayne Bennett (1986–1988, 1998, 2001–2003, 2020)	13	11	1
Graham Lowe (1991–1992)	3	3	0
Wally Lewis (1993–1994)	2	4	0
Paul Vautin (1995–1997)	4	5	0
Mark Murray (1999–2000)	1	4	1
Michael Hagan (2004–2005)	2	4	0
Mal Meninga (2006–2015)	20	10	0
Kevin Walters (2016–2019)	6	6	0
Paul Green (2021)	1	2	0
Billy Slater (2022–2026)	8	7	0
Darius Boyd (2027)	0	0	0

=== Referees ===
The following referees have controlled State of Origin series matches.

Name	State/country	Games	NSW wins	Qld wins	Drawn
Ashley Klein	New South Wales	23	12	11	0
Gerard Sutton	New South Wales	22	10	12	0
Bill Harrigan^{1}	New South Wales	21	9	11	1
Ben Cummins	New South Wales	14	6	8	0
David Manson	Queensland	10	7	3	0
Tony Archer	New South Wales	10	2	8	0
Shayne Hayne	New South Wales	10	2	8	0
Barry Gomersall	Queensland	9	2	7	0
Kevin Roberts	New South Wales	6	5	1	0
Greg McCallum	New South Wales	5	2	3	0
Eddie Ward	Queensland	5	2	3	0
Steven Clark	New South Wales	5	2	2	1
Paul Simpkins	New South Wales	4	2	2	0
Michael Stone^{2}	New South Wales	3	1	2	0
Sean Hampstead	New South Wales	3	2	1	0
Matt Cecchin	New South Wales	2	1	1	0
Graham Annesley	New South Wales	1	1	0	0
John Gocher	New South Wales	1	1	0	0
Kelvin Jeffes	New South Wales	1	1	0	0
Kevin Steel	New Zealand	1	0	1	0
Billy Thompson	Great Britain	1	0	1	0
Robin Whitfield	Great Britain	1	0	1	0
Don Wilson	New Zealand	1	0	1	0
Jared Maxwell	New South Wales	1	0	1	0

1. Bill Harrigan also refereed both matches between New South Wales and Queensland in the Super League Tri-series.
- Most games in a row: 22 (Gerard Sutton)

== See also ==
- List of NRL records
- List of records in the National Youth Competition (rugby league)

== Sources ==
- Former Origin Greats (FOGS) website
- World of Rugby League website
- State of Origin Past Series Winners at australianrugbyleague.com.au
