= Brent Tate =

Australia international rugby league footballer

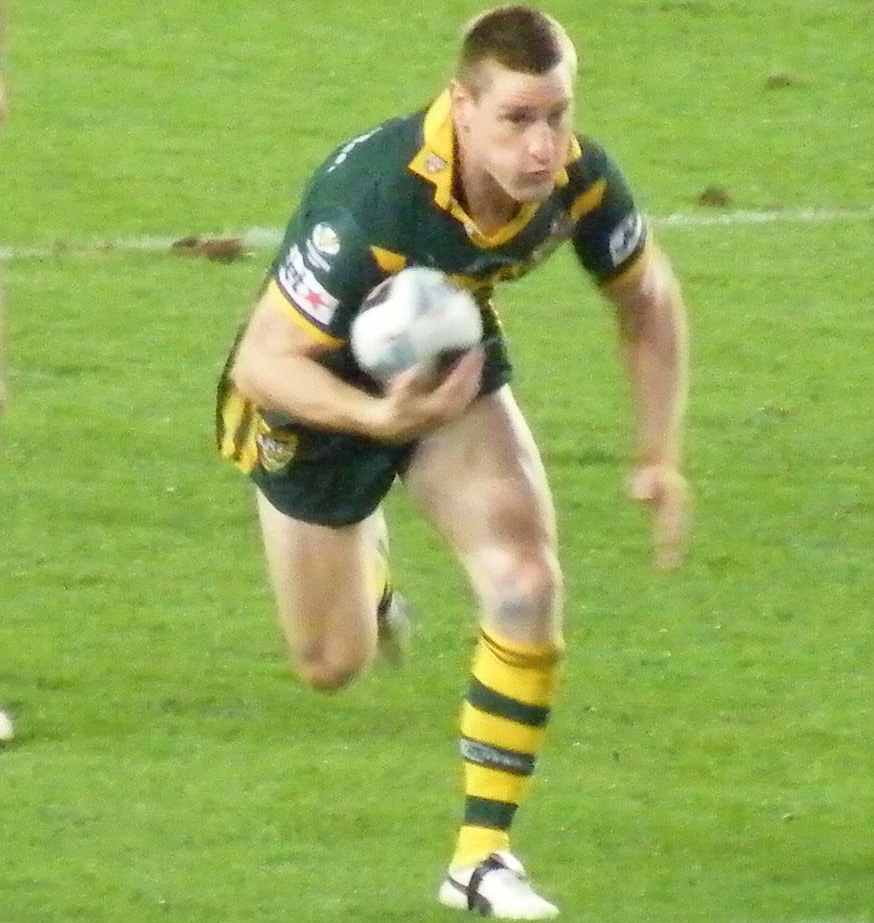

Personal information
- Born: 3 March 1982 (age 44) Roma, Queensland, Australia

Playing information
- Height: 186 cm (6 ft 1 in)
- Weight: 93 kg (14 st 9 lb)
- Position: Centre, Wing
Club
Years	Team	Pld	T	G	FG	P
2001–07	Brisbane Broncos	114	41	0	0	164
2008–10	New Zealand Warriors	48	12	0	0	48
2011–14	North Qld Cowboys	67	28	0	0	112
	Total	229	81	0	0	324
Representative
Years	Team	Pld	T	G	FG	P
2002–14	Queensland	23	5	0	0	20
2002–13	Australia	26	16	0	0	64
2012	NRL All Stars	1	0	0	0	0
2013	Prime Minister's XIII	1	1	0	0	4
- Education: Clontarf Beach State High School
- Relatives: Steve Price (brother-in-law); Riley Price (nephew); Jamie-Lee Price (niece)

Brent Tate (born 3 March 1982) is an Australian former professional rugby league footballer who played as a centre or winger in the 2000s and 2010s. An Australia international and Queensland State of Origin representative, he played his club football in the NRL for the Brisbane Broncos (with whom he won the 2006 NRL Premiership), the New Zealand Warriors and the North Queensland Cowboys. Despite a career that was set back by a series of severe injuries, Tate kept coming back and was a member of the 2006, 2007, 2008, 2012 and 2013 State of Origin series-winning Queensland sides, as well as the 2008 and 2013 World Cup Australian sides, winning the 2013 edition with them.

== Early life ==
Tate was born in Roma, Queensland and moved to Redcliffe at the age of 9. He played his junior rugby league for the Redcliffe Dolphins and attended Clontarf Beach State High School, where he represented the Australian Schoolboys in 1999. He was originally a scholarship holder with the South Queensland Crushers, signing with the Brisbane Broncos after the Crushers folded.

== Professional playing career ==
=== Brisbane Broncos ===
Tate made his National Rugby League debut for the Brisbane Broncos in Round 21 of the 2001 season, in a match against the Melbourne Storm at the Colonial Stadium. He earned his first representative honours in 2002, playing for Queensland in Game 3 of the 2002 State of Origin series. On 12 July 2002, Tate made his international debut for Australia from the bench in a one-off test against Great Britain at the Sydney Football Stadium, with the Kangaroos running out easy 64–10 winners, scoring 11 tries to 2 in their biggest winning margin over the Lions. He was named the 2002 Brisbane Broncos season's rookie of the year after scoring 10 tries in 23 games. Tate made his run-on debut for Australia in the end of season Test match against New Zealand at the Westpac Stadium in Wellington.

Tate continued his good form in 2003, moving into the Queensland starting side for all 3 State of Origin games, scoring 2 tries in Game 3. He was again selected for Australia in the Anzac Test against New Zealand in Sydney, scoring two tries as Australia defeated the Kiwis 48–6. However, Tate suffered a career-threatening neck injury that has affected him ever since, and his career has only been prolonged with the aid of a special neck brace. His neck injury kept him out of the beginning of the 2004 season, but recovered in time for the Anzac Test, and continued to earn representative selection for both Queensland and Australia. 2005 was a disappointing season for Tate, with further injuries preventing him from playing in the 2005 State of Origin series. Despite this, his form for the Broncos saw him selected for in the Australian team for the end of season Tri-Nations tournament against New Zealand and hosts Great Britain.

In 2006, Tate was again injured for the first part of the season, but made a shock comeback in Game 1 of the State of Origin. In Game 3 in Melbourne, Tate scored a crucial try, beginning a Queensland comeback that led to them winning the match and the series. For the first time in his Origin career, he was named man-of-the-match for Game 3.

Tate was also an integral part of the Brisbane Broncos' 2006 NRL Grand Final-winning team that year, once again being rewarded with national selection for the 2006 Tri-Nations. In the final against defending champions New Zealand at the Sydney Football Stadium, Australia had a hard-fought 16–12 win in extra time, again thanks to a try to captain Darren Lockyer. Playing on the wing, Tate scored Australia's only other try for the game. As 2006 NRL Premiers, the Brisbane Broncos travelled to England to face 2006 Super League champions, St Helens R.F.C. in the 2007 World Club Challenge. Tate played at centre in the Broncos' 14–18 loss.

On 30 May 2007, it was announced that Tate would be leaving the Broncos at the end of the 2007 season to sign with the New Zealand Warriors on a three-year contract. He decided to join the Warriors due to the opportunity to play in his preferred position of centre.

Tate was selected to play for the Australian national team on the wing in the 2007 ANZAC Test match against New Zealand, scoring a try in the Kangaroos' 30–6 victory. His career with the Broncos was cut short while playing for Queensland during Game III of the 2007 State of Origin series, where he suffered a season-ending knee injury to the medial and anterior cruciate ligament.

=== New Zealand Warriors ===
Tate made his New Zealand Warriors debut in Round 1, 2008 against the Melbourne Storm at Telstra Dome, against the same team and at the same stadium in which he made his NRL debut for Brisbane.

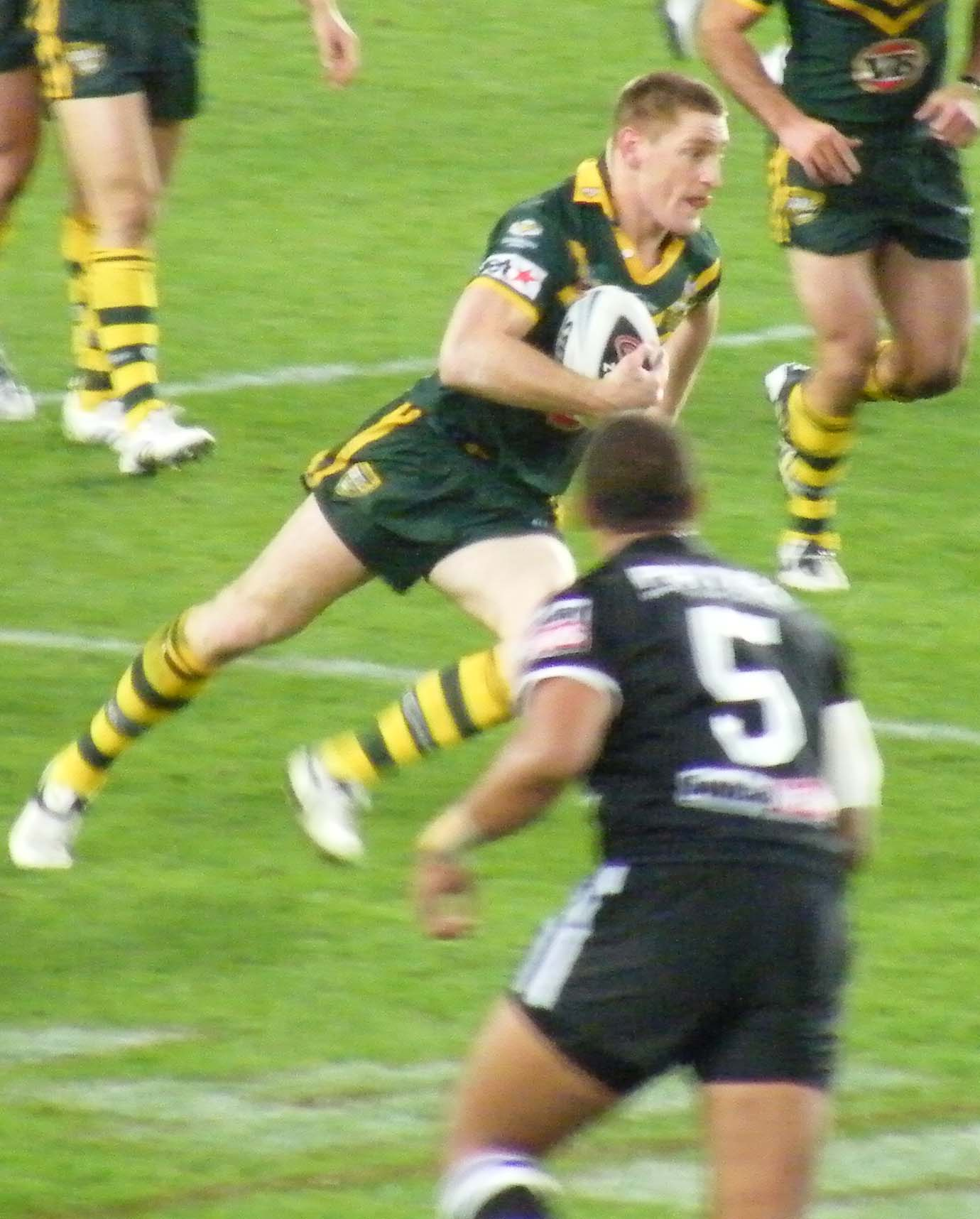
Tate playing for Australia during the 2008 World Cup.

In August 2008, Tate was named in the Australia training squad for the 2008 Rugby League World Cup, and in October 2008 he was selected in the final 24-man Australia squad. However, due to injury he did not play in the final of the World Cup, with the Kangaroos going to lose the final to New Zealand 20–34, giving the Kiwi's their first ever World Cup win.

In September 2008, Tate was named on the bench in the Australian Schoolboys Team of the Century.

Tate's 2009 season was cut short, when in a Round 3 clash against his former club Brisbane, he suffered another season-ending injury when he damaged his anterior cruciate ligament in the process of being tackled.

He returned to the field in 2010, and with injuries early in the season to Steve Price, Simon Mannering and Micheal Luck, Tate stood-in as captain of the Warriors. The Warriors won their first game under Tate's captaincy, a 30–24 win in Round 5 over Canterbury at the ANZ Stadium in Sydney. However, they were defeated 40–12 in their next game against Penrith at home at Mt Smart.

On 23 June 2010, Tate announced that his three-year stay at the New Zealand side was over, opting to return to his home state of Queensland to play for the North Queensland Cowboys. Tate cited the decision as the "toughest he has ever had to make".

At the end of the 2010 season, Tate was again selected for Australia's Four Nations campaign (the tournament had been expanded to include a fourth team in 2009). Tate, who as of 2013 played his last game for Australia in the final (in which he scored a try), was the tournaments equal leading try scorer with 4 alongside Junior Sa'u (NZ) and Tony Clubb (England). Tate had scored a try in each game he played against Papua New Guinea, England and NZ.

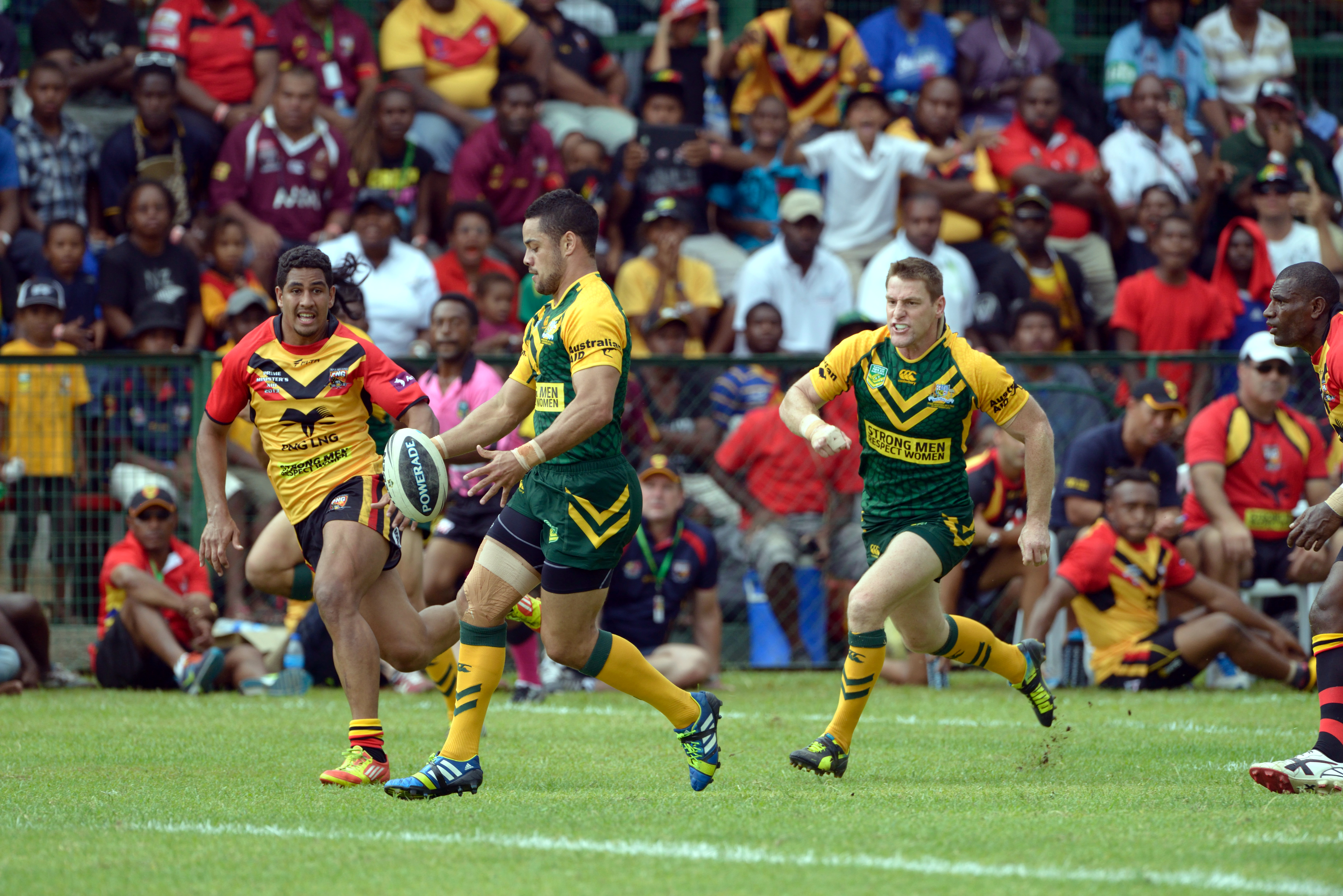
Tate playing for the PM's XIII in 2013

=== North Queensland Cowboys ===
Tate's first season with the North Queensland outfit in 2011, was disrupted by the rupturing of his anterior cruciate ligament (ACL) in the Four Nations Final the previous November. The injury forced him to undergo a knee reconstruction for the third time in his career. The injury caused him to consider retirement; however, he recovered to make his debut for North Queensland in round 19 of the 2011 season, and played in the team's qualifying final loss to the Manly-Warringah Sea Eagles.

Tate continued to play for Queensland in the 2012 State of Origin series, helping the Maroons to a record-breaking 7th series win in a row dating back to 2006.

Tate was selected on the wing for Qld in the opening game of the 2013 Origin series. Despite the Maroons going down 14–6 to NSW in Sydney, he retained his spot for Game 2 of the series in Brisbane. Tate was named man-of-the-match in Queensland's win in the third and deciding game of the series, which extended their record winning streak to eight series.

Tate continued playing for Queensland in the 2014 State of Origin series. During the 2nd game of the State of Origin series, Tate suffered another ACL knee injury.

On 3 September 2014, Tate announced his retirement from Rugby League after accepting medical advice that returning from the ruptured ACL sustained during that year's State of Origin series was one fight too many.

== Post playing ==
In 2015, Tate became an NRL community ambassador after his retirement in 2014. Tate also released his autobiography Iron Will the same year.

In 2016, Tate was appointed to the Touch Football Australia board.

In 2019, Tate was part of an Old Boys match against the Townsville Blackhawks.

Since 2015, he has worked as a commentator for Fox Sports and a business development manager for the North Queensland Cowboys. He also released an autobiography in 2015.

On 18 February 2026, the Cowboys announced that Tate was appointed as a member of the board.

== Personal life ==
Tate is the brother-in-law of Steve Price, with whom he played for the Warriors, Queensland and Australia, and the uncle of Giants Netball player Jamie-Lee Price and current Penrith Panthers player Riley Price.
