= 2005 State of Origin series =

Australian rugby league series

- Won by: New South Wales (12th title)
- Series margin: 2-1
- Points scored: 140
- Attendance: 187,309 (ave. 62,436 per match)
- Player of the series: Anthony Minichiello
- Top points scorer(s): Cameron Smith (18)
- Top try scorer(s): Matt Bowen Matt King (3)

The 2005 State of Origin series saw the 24th time that the annual three-game series between the Queensland and New South Wales representative rugby league football teams was contested entirely under 'state of origin' selection rules. The three matches drew a total attendance of 187,309 and New South Wales won the series 2–1, their third consecutive series victory, and their last until 2014.

The Wally Lewis Medal for Player of the Series was awarded to New South Wales' fullback, Anthony Minichiello. The Ron McAuliffe Medal for Queensland player of the series was awarded to Cameron Smith. The Brad Fittler Medal for New South Wales player of the series was awarded to Matt King.

== Game I ==
Wednesday, 25 May 2005
8:00pm (AEST)

Queensland	24 – 20	New South Wales
Tries: Ty Williams (20') 1 Michael Crocker (48') 1 Matt Bowen (84') 1 Goals: Cameron Smith 5/5 (7' pen, 18' pen, 21', 34' pen, 50'); Darren Lockyer 0/1; Field Goals: Darren Lockyer 1/3 (40'); Johnathan Thurston 1/1 (78')	1st: 13 - 0; 2nd: 7 - 20 g.p.: 4 - 0 (Report)	Tries: Luke Rooney (52') 1 Mark Gasnier (61') 1 Craig Fitzgibbon (68') 1 Danny Buderus (71') 1 Goals: Craig Fitzgibbon 2/3 (69', 72'); Brett Kimmorley 0/1

Suncorp Stadium, Brisbane
Attendance: 52,484
Referee: Paul Simpkins
Player of the Match: Steve Price

The crowd of 52,484 people at Suncorp Stadium was a record for the ground at the time. After fifty minutes, Queensland had raced away to a 19–0 lead. However New South Wales, under new coach Ricky Stuart made a strong comeback, bringing the score to 20–19 in their favour. A field goal from Johnathan Thurston, in his first match for the Maroons, saw the game go into 'golden point' extra time. Brett Kimmorley, playing halfback in place of an injured Andrew Johns, threw a pass intended for Matt King, but was instead intercepted by Matt Bowen, who snatched a 24–20 victory for the Maroons.

== Game II ==
Wednesday, 15 June 2005
8:00pm (AEST)

New South Wales	32 – 22	Queensland
Tries: Anthony Minichiello (15', 44') 2 Steve Menzies (48') 1 Matt Cooper (59') 1 Danny Buderus (76') 1 Goals: Andrew Johns 3/3 (46', 50', 61'); Craig Fitzgibbon 3/3 (15', 18' pen, 78')	1st: 8 - 12; 2nd: 24 - 10 (Report)	Tries: Brad Thorn (23') 1 Billy Slater (32') 1 Matt Bowen (69') 1 Petero Civoniceva (80') 1 Goals: Cameron Smith 3/4 (24', 34', 80')

Telstra Stadium, Sydney
Attendance: 82,389
Referee: Steve Clark
Player of the Match: Andrew Johns

Having made his first NRL reappearance just ten days earlier following recovery from injury, Andrew Johns made his State of Origin comeback for Game II with a man-of-the-match performance to help level the 2005 series. This game opened with the Blues sustaining immense pressure on their own line for the opening 15 minutes of the match before breaking through for a try to Minichiello to open the scoring.

== Game III ==
Wednesday, 6 July 2005
8:00pm (AEST)

Queensland	10 – 32	New South Wales
Tries: Johnathan Thurston (74') 1 Matt Bowen (77') 1 Goals: Cameron Smith 1/2 (75')	1st: 0 - 18; 2nd: 10 - 14 (Report)	Tries: Matt King (31', 47', 64') 3 Braith Anasta (21') 1 Mark Gasnier (27') 1 Timana Tahu (53') 1 Goals: Andrew Johns 3/5 (22', 29', 48'); Craig Fitzgibbon 1/2 (9' pen)

Suncorp Stadium, Brisbane
Attendance: 52,436
Referee: Paul Simpkins
Player of the Match: Anthony Minichiello

After 25 years the 2005 decider was the 75th game between the two sides, with 36 wins for each side. After an hour New South Wales had raced away to a 32–0 lead and late tries to Queensland proved too little too late. Matt King became only the ninth player (and fourth New South Welshman) to score a hat-trick in State of Origin.

== New South Wales squad ==
Position	Game 1	Game 2	Game 3
Fullback	Anthony Minichiello		
Wing	Matt King		
Centre	Mark Gasnier		
Centre	Matt Cooper		
Wing	Luke Rooney		Timana Tahu
Five-Eighth	Trent Barrett	Braith Anasta	
Halfback	Brett Kimmorley	Andrew Johns	
Prop	Luke Bailey	Steve Simpson	Luke Bailey
Hooker	Danny Buderus (c)		
Prop	Jason Ryles		
Second Row	Nathan Hindmarsh		
Second Row	Craig Fitzgibbon		
Lock	Ben Kennedy		
Interchange	Craig Wing		Craig Gower
Interchange	Steve Simpson	Steve Menzies	
Interchange	Anthony Watmough	Luke Bailey	Steve Simpson
Interchange	Andrew Ryan		
Coach	Ricky Stuart		

== Queensland squad ==
Position	Game 1	Game 2	Game 3
Fullback	Billy Slater		Matt Bowen
Wing	Ty Williams		
Centre	Shaun Berrigan		
Centre	Paul Bowman		
Wing	Matt Sing		
Five-Eighth	Darren Lockyer (c)		
Halfback	Johnathan Thurston		
Prop	Steve Price	Brad Thorn	Danny Nutley
Hooker	Cameron Smith		
Prop	Petero Civoniceva		
Second Row	Michael Crocker		
Second Row	Brad Thorn	Carl Webb	Brad Thorn
Lock	Chris Flannery		
Interchange	Ben Ross		
Interchange	Carl Webb	Dane Carlaw	Corey Parker
Interchange	Casey McGuire		Ashley Harrison
Interchange	Matt Bowen		Tonie Carroll
Coach	Michael Hagan		

== See also ==
- 2005 NRL season
