= Jamie-Lee Price =

Australian netball player (born 1996)

Personal information
- Born: 10 January 1996 (age 30) Sydney, Australia
- Occupation: Netballer
- Relatives: Steve Price (father) and Joanne Price (mother); Riley Price (brother); Brent Tate (uncle)
- School: Mount Albert Grammar School

Netball career
- Playing positions: WD, C
Years	Club team	Apps
2013–2016	Waikato Bay of Plenty Magic	
2017–2025	Giants Netball	135
2026–	Melbourne Mavericks	15
Years	National team	Caps
2018–present	Australian Diamonds	63
Medal record
Representing Australia
Netball World Cup
Silver medal – second place	2019 Liverpool	Team
Gold medal – first place	2023 Cape Town	Team
Commonwealth Games
Bronze medal – third place	2026 Glasgow	Netball

Jamie-Lee Price (born 10 January 1996) is an Australian netball player who plays for the Melbourne Mavericks in the Suncorp Super Netball league.

Prior to that, Price was with the Waikato Bay of Plenty Magic in the ANZ Championship. She was the youngest player in the trans-Tasman championship as of January 2013.

She played for the Giants Netball team from 2017-2025.

She was selected in the Australian Diamonds squad for the 2018/19 international season.

In 2023, she won gold at the Netball World Cup with the Australian Diamonds.

Price is the daughter of Australian rugby league footballer Steve Price, the sister of North Queensland Cowboys NRL player Riley Price and the niece of Brisbane Broncos premiership winning player Brent Tate.

Price was born in Sydney in Australia, before moving to Auckland in New Zealand at eight years old after her father joined the New Zealand Warriors. While growing up in Auckland, she attended Mount Albert Grammar School and captained their successful netball team. She first played netball in the Bankstown Netball Association in Sydney's Canterbury-Bankstown region.
