= Steve Price (rugby league, born 1974) =

Australia international rugby league footballer

Steve Price MNZM
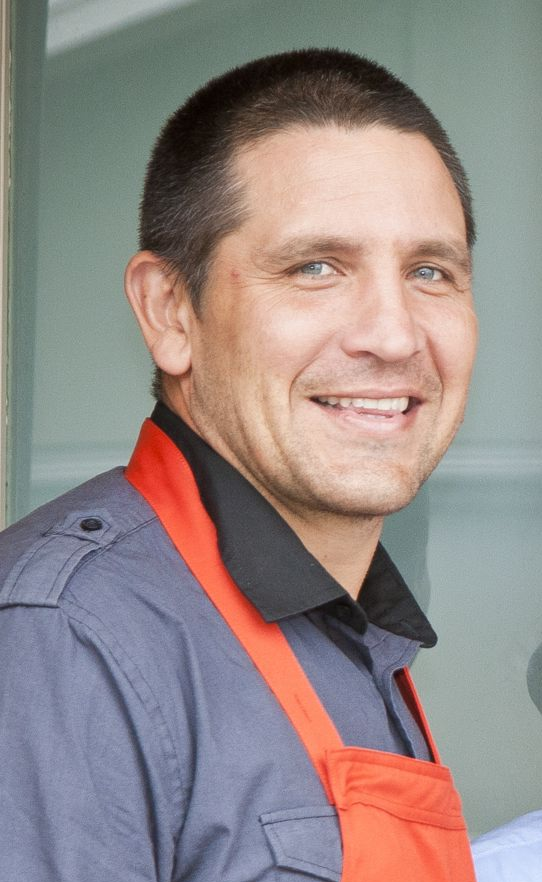

Personal information
- Full name: Steven John Price
- Born: March 12, 1974 (age 52) Dalby, Queensland, Australia
- Height: 193 cm (6 ft 4 in)
- Weight: 107 kg (16 st 12 lb)

Playing information
- Position: Prop
Club
Years	Team	Pld	T	G	FG	P
1994–04	Canterbury Bulldogs	222	22	0	0	88
2005–09	New Zealand Warriors	91	13	0	0	52
	Total	313	35	0	0	140
Representative
Years	Team	Pld	T	G	FG	P
1998–09	Queensland	28	2	0	0	8
1998–09	Australia	16	1	0	0	4
2005–06	Prime Minister's XIII	2	1	0	0	4
2007	All Golds	1	0	0	0	0
- Source: As of 16 December 2023
- Education: Harristown State High School
- Spouse: Joanne Price
- Relatives: Brent Tate (brother-in-law); Jamie-Lee Price (daughter); Riley Price (son)

Steven John Price MNZM is an Australian former professional rugby league footballer who played in the 1990s and 2000s primarily as a prop. An Australian international representative, he retired as Queensland's most capped State of Origin forward. Price captained Sydney club, the Canterbury-Bankstown Bulldogs (with whom he won the 1995 and 2004 premierships) as well as New Zealand NRL club, the Warriors.

== Background ==
Price grew up in Toowoomba, where he attended Harristown State High School. Price was spotted playing rugby league for the Newtown Lions club in Toowoomba and was signed to the New South Wales Rugby League premiership club, Sydney's Canterbury Bulldogs in 1993.

== Playing career ==
=== Canterbury-Bankstown ===
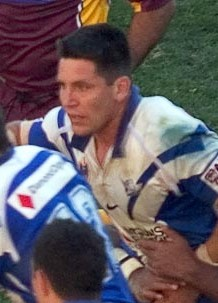
Price playing for the Bulldogs in 2004

During the 1994 NSWRL season, Price made his first grade debut for the Canterbury-Bankstown Bulldogs at Belmore Sports Ground on 3 July against the Balmain Tigers. It was a great rookie year for Price as his side finished the regular season as minor premiers on top of the ladder and eventually going on to reach the 1994 Grand Final which they lost to Mal Meninga's Canberra Raiders. The disappointment of losing the Grand Final did not last long for Price, as the following year in the 1995 season, Canterbury reached their second consecutive Grand Final to come up against the Manly Sea Eagles. Price was named on the starting line-up and as a headgear-wearing second-rower scored the first try of the game which the Bulldogs eventually won 17–4, giving Price his first taste of premiership victory. The experience of finals football so early in his career was a positive for Price as he established a reputation as an effective front rower/prop and second rower with a high work rate.

During the 1998 season, Price made his debut for Queensland in game one of the 1998 State of Origin series, scoring a crucial try on debut in a match that Queensland would go on to win by 1 point with a conversion after the siren. He would retain his spot for the following two matches of series in which Queensland were victorious two games to one. His performance at representative level was then awarded with the highest honour for an Australian player as he was announced in the 1998 Kangaroos squad. In the same year Steve Price and the Canterbury-Bankstown Bulldogs made a terrific finals run where, after finishing the season in 9th position, they won four must-win matches to make it all the way through to the 1998 NRL Grand Final against the Brisbane Broncos which they lost 38–12.

When Bulldogs captain Darren Britt left the club at the end of 2001, coach Steve Folkes opted for Price to captain the side for 2002. He proved to be a great captain and the Bulldogs finished the 2002 season with 20 wins, 1 draw and only 3 losses, although they would not play in the finals due to the salary cap breach. 2003 was another strong year for Price as he was awarded Player of the Year by magazine Rugby League Week; he also captained the sides to 18 regular season wins and a semi-final berth which they lost to the Sydney Roosters. In 2004 Price had a stellar performance playing for Queensland and was awarded the Ron McAuliffe Medal for Queensland player of the series.

During the transfer period in 2004, it was announced that it would be his last year with the Bulldogs after ten years of service, as he was signing with the New Zealand Warriors for 2005. Price could not have gone out in better style as the Bulldogs finished second on the ladder, missing out on the minor premiership by points difference. Price's fairytale ending was then shattered when he tore his medial ligament the week before the Grand Final. His side played well without their inspirational captain and went on to win 16–13 to send Price out with another Grand Final success, even though he did not compete in the final game.

=== New Zealand Warriors ===
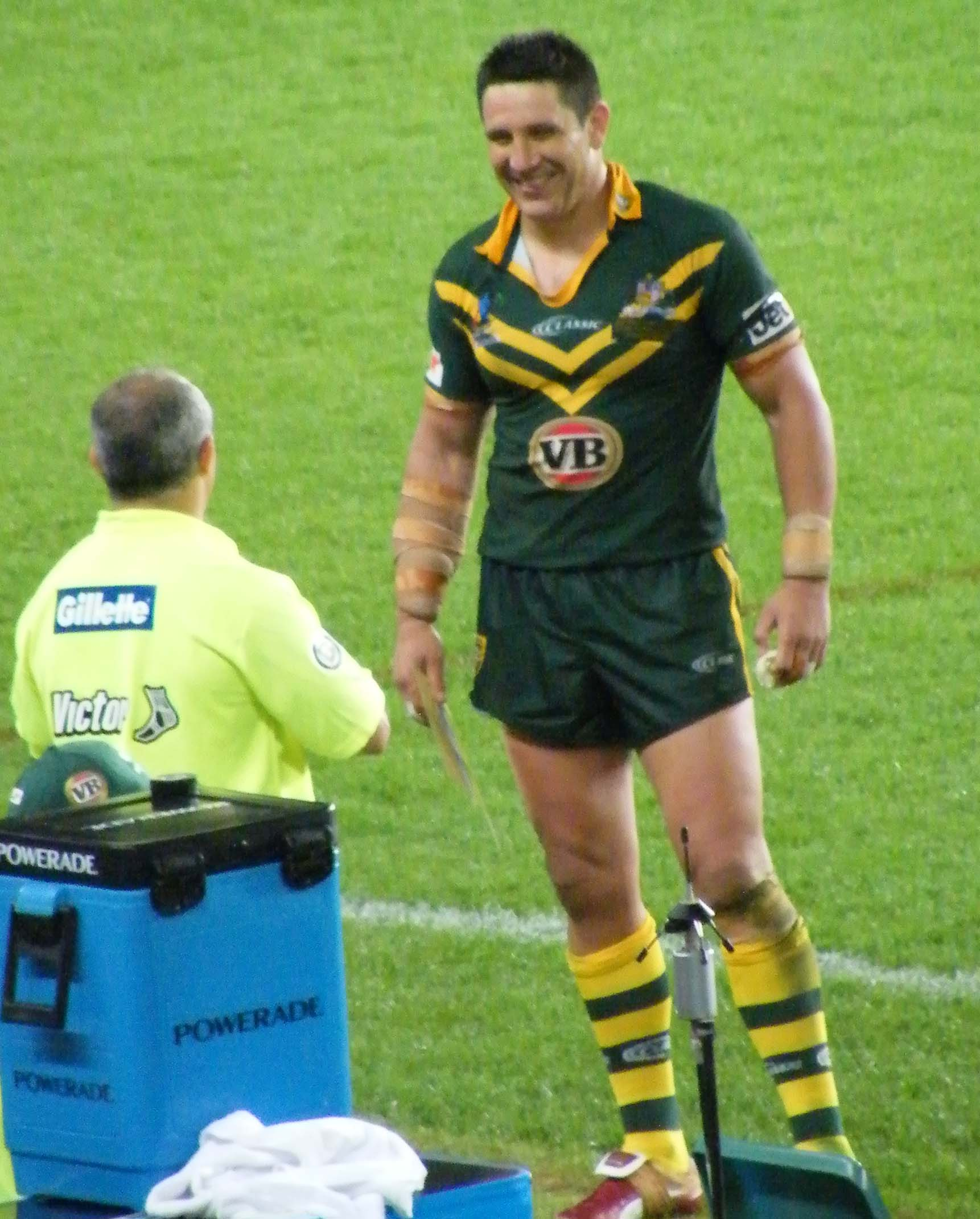
Price while playing for Australia in 2008

When Price left Canterbury, who had appeared in the finals consistently and performed very well, he went to join the Warriors who had experienced their worst ever season in 2004, finishing 14th of 15 teams and winning only 6 games all year. Price was immediately appointed captain of the squad and clearly made an impact as the team remained competitive in all of their matches. In the opening match of the 2005 State of Origin series Price was named man of the match. The Warriors had a good chance to make the finals; however, a four-match losing streak late in the season removed those chances and they finished the 2005 season 11th, a slight improvement from the previous year.

Even at the age of 33 and after 13 years playing professional football, the 2007 season proved to be one of his career bests. In Round 14 Steve Price broke his own record of 'metres gained by a forward' playing against the Cronulla Sharks. Price's previous record was 272 metres; he eclipsed this by gaining 306 metres from 33 hit-ups. Seven weeks later in round 21 Price broke his own record again, this time against the Sydney Roosters where he ran for a total of 323 m. The Warriors finished the regular season strongly, sitting at the top end of the ladder on 4th position, although they struggled to perform come finals time and dropped out of the competition in the second week of the finals losing to the North Queensland Cowboys. However, Price's own personal performance throughout the year was duly recognised as he was awarded the Captain of the Year & Prop of the Year titles at the 2007 Dally M Awards. He ran 4,515 metres with the ball in 2007, more than any other forward in history.

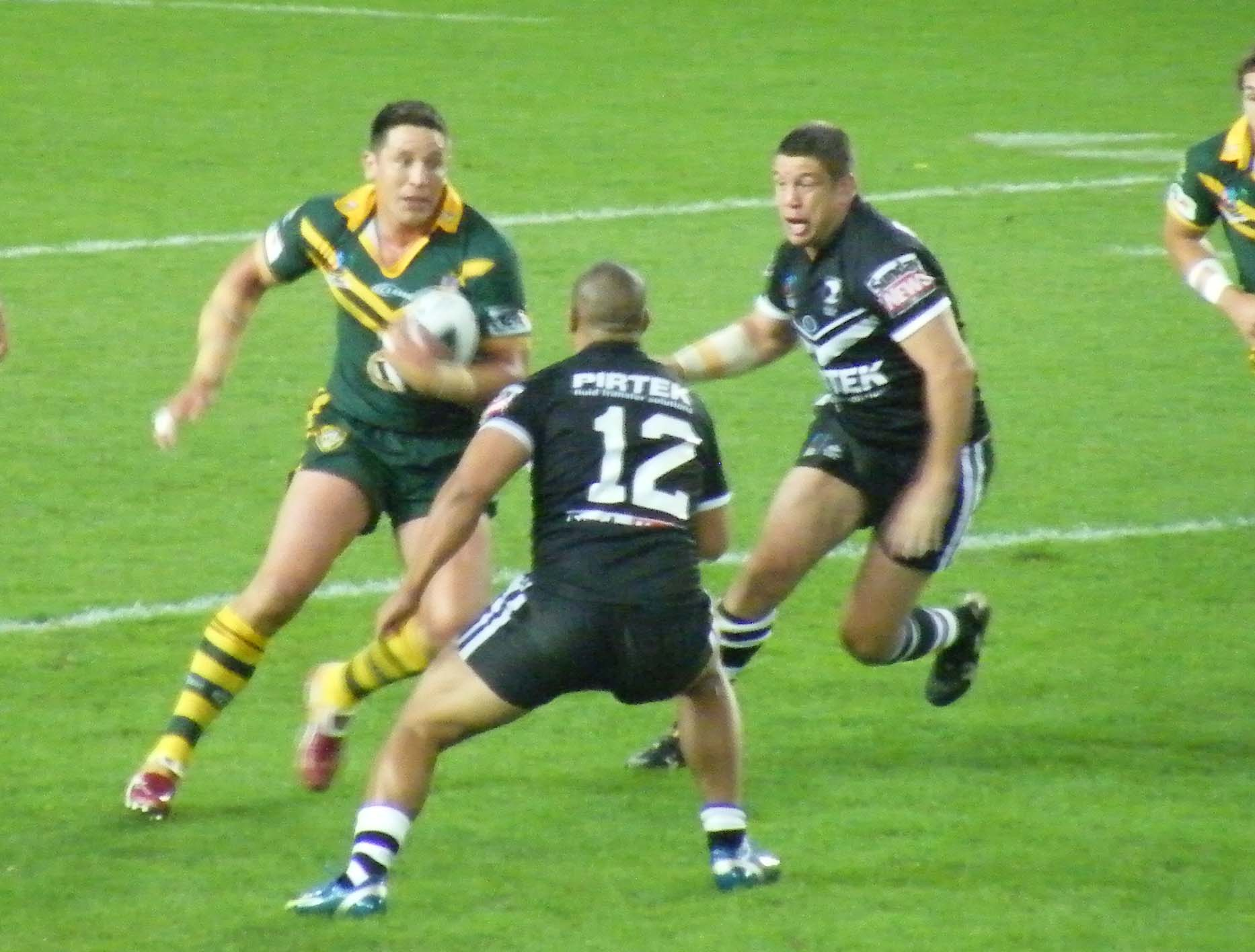
Price playing against New Zealand in 2008

In August 2008, Price was named in the preliminary 46-man Kangaroos squad for the 2008 Rugby League World Cup, and in October 2008 he was selected in the final 24-man Australia squad. He did not, however, play in the World Cup Final due to tearing his calf in the final training session before the Final which Australia lost to the Kiwis.

Price was eligible for England and New Zealand; however, he has stated he will not switch his allegiance from Australia.

In April 2009, he was named in the preliminary 25-man squad to represent Queensland in the opening State of Origin match for 2009.

On Sunday 3 May 2009 Price confirmed he would extend his NRL career to a 17th season after signing a one-year contract with the New Zealand Warriors. Already the NRL's oldest player in 2009, Price was 36 at the start of the 2010 season. He was selected for Australia in the one-off test match against New Zealand on 8 May 2009. In State of Origin 3, 2009, Price was involved in a fight with Brett White, in which he was knocked unconscious by a right hook from White, and while unconscious, he was lifted up by the jersey and dropped on his head by Justin Poore.

Price was replaced as the Warriors club captain for the 2010 season by Simon Mannering, in a move described by the club as building for the future.

On 6 April 2010, Price announced his retirement from rugby league at the conclusion of the 2010 NRL season.

On 29 June 2010, Price announced his immediate retirement. This was due to a heel injury that he picked up during the off-season. This injury did not heal correctly and resulted in three operations, meaning that he would be unable to take to the field at all during the 2010 NRL season. This meant that although 2010 would be his final season as a professional rugby league player, he would not play a single game.

=== Playing awards ===
==== Individual playing awards ====
- 2002: Dally M Captain of the Year
- 2004: Ron McAuliffe Medal – Queensland State of Origin player of the series
- 2004: Dally M Captain of the Year
- 2006: NZ Warriors Lion Red Player of Year
- 2007: Dally M Captain of the Year
- 2007: Dally M Prop of the Year
- 2007: NZ Warriors Lion Red Player of Year
- NRL Records: Most meters gained by a forward (323m vs. Sydney Roosters. Round 21, 2007)

==== Team playing awards ====
- 1994: Minor Premiers (Canterbury-Bankstown Bulldogs)
- 1995: Premiers (Canterbury-Bankstown Bulldogs)
- 2004: Premiers (Canterbury-Bankstown Bulldogs) (did not actually play in the grand final due to injury)

== Post-playing career ==
Price graduated from the Southern Cross University with a Masters in Business Administration in 2010 as the Outstanding Young Alumnus of the Year.

In the 2011 New Year Honours, Price was appointed a Member of the New Zealand Order of Merit for services to rugby league. The award citation read: "He began the role (as captain) following the club's worst-ever season and helped rebuild it to become one of the league’s best." "He played a mentoring role to less experienced players. In 2006 he led the team with honesty and integrity while it was investigated by the National Rugby League over salary cap breaches, and in 2007 he was awarded Captain of the Year and Prop of the Year at the Dally M Awards." "Mr Price has been described as 'the most loved Australian in New Zealand sporting history'."

== Personal life ==
Price is the father of Giants Netball player Jamie-Lee Price and New Zealand Warriors NRL player Riley Price.
