= Riley Price =

Australian rugby league footballer

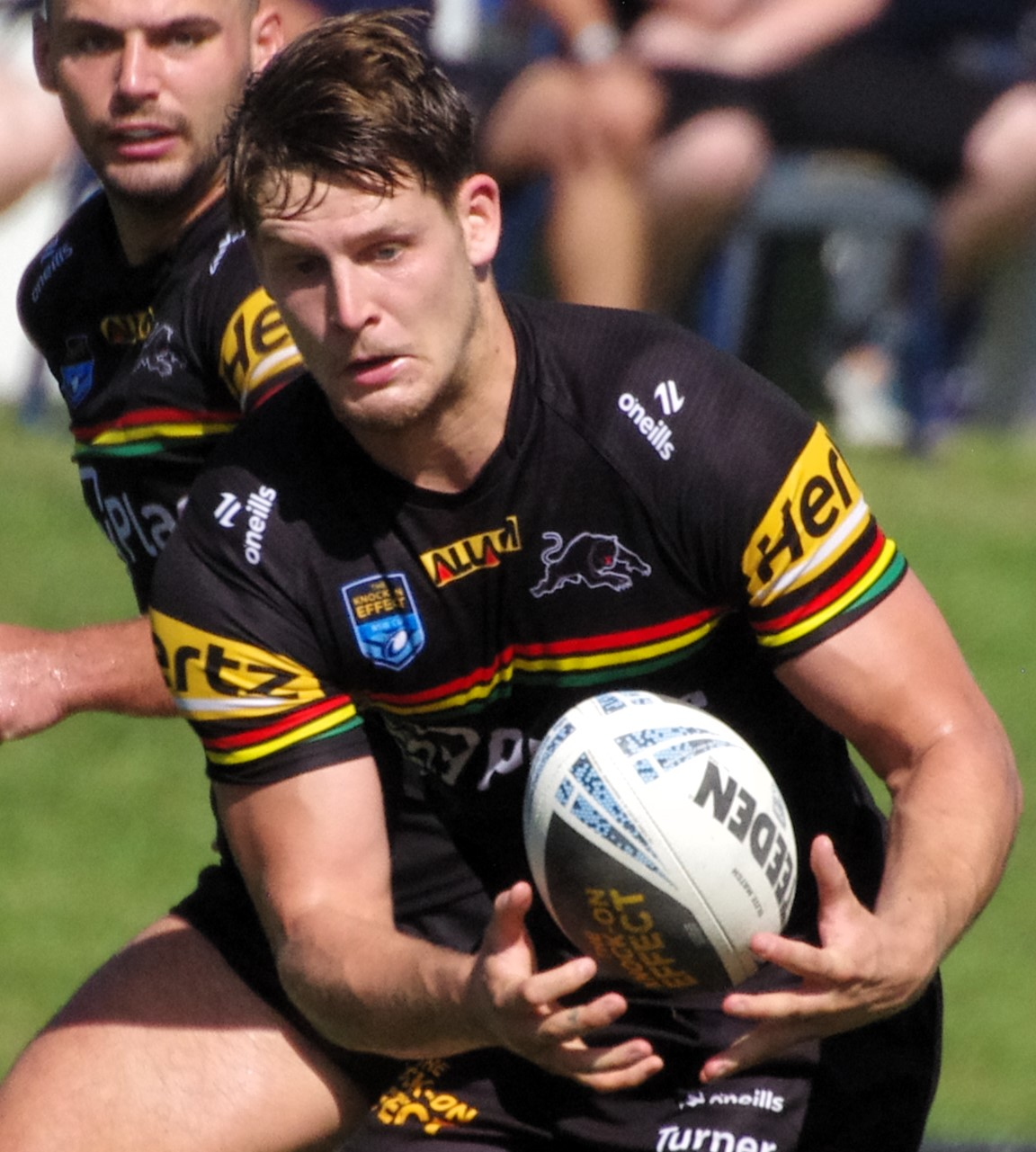

Personal information
- Full name: Riley Price
- Born: 7 June 2001 (age 25) Hurstville, New South Wales, Australia
- Height: 188 cm (6 ft 2 in)
- Weight: 96 kg (15 st 2 lb)

Playing information
- Position: Second-row, Prop, Lock
Club
Years	Team	Pld	T	G	FG	P
2019–23	North Qld Cowboys	2	0	0	0	0
2024–25	Penrith Panthers	1	0	0	0	0
2026–	New Zealand Warriors	1	0	0	0	0
	Total	4	0	0	0	0
- Source: As of 1 August 2026
- Father: Steve Price
- Relatives: Brent Tate (uncle); Jamie-Lee Price (sister)

Riley Price (born 7 June 2001) is an Australian professional rugby league footballer who plays as a second-row, prop, lock forward for the New Zealand Warriors in the National Rugby League (NRL).

He previously played for the Penrith Panthers and the North Queensland Cowboys in the NRL.

== Background ==
Price was born in Hurstville, New South Wales while his father Steve, a Queensland and Australian representative, was playing for the Canterbury-Bankstown Bulldogs in Sydney.

In 2005, Price moved to Auckland when his father joined the New Zealand Warriors. In Auckland, he played his first junior rugby league for the Mt Albert Lions. Price returned to Australia when he was 15 years old, living on the Sunshine Coast and playing rugby league for the Kawana Dolphins. After attending Mount Albert Grammar School while based in Auckland, Price continued his schooling at Caloundra State High School upon returning to Australia before graduating from Mountain Creek State High School in 2018.

His uncle, Brent Tate, is also a former Queensland and Australian representative. His sister, Jamie-Lee Price, plays for Giants Netball in the Suncorp Super Netball and has represented Australia a member of the Diamonds netball squad.

== Playing career ==
=== Early career ===
In 2018, Price played for the Sunshine Coast Falcons in the Mal Meninga Cup and Hastings Deering Colts competitions.

In 2019, after starting the season with the Falcons, Price signed with the North Queensland Cowboys and played for the Townsville Blackhawks under-20s side.

In 2020, he was named in the Queensland under-20 Emerging Origin squad.

In 2021, Price played for the Blackhawks in the Queensland Cup and re-signed with the Cowboys until the end of 2023, joining their NRL squad. While on a development contract, he spent the entire 2022 season playing in the Queensland Cup.

=== 2023 & 2024 ===
In round 5 of the 2023 NRL season, Price made his first-grade debut against the Canterbury-Bankstown Bulldogs, coincidentally the club his father played for at Stadium Australia. This game ended in a 15-14 loss to North Queensland during golden point extra-time. His second first grade game was the following week, a 32-22 loss to the Dolphins at Queensland Country Bank Stadium. At the end of 2023, Price signed a contract to join Penrith. During the 2024 season, he played for the clubs NSW Cup team making 19 appearances.

=== 2025 ===
In round 26 of the 2025 NRL season, Price made his club debut for Penrith against Canterbury. On 9 September, it was announced that Price would be departing Penrith at the end of the 2025 NRL season after not being offered a new contract by the club.

=== 2026 ===
On 29 June 2026, the New Zealand Warriors announced the signing of Price for the remainder of the Warriors' season. On 1 August, Price made his debut in a 42–6 win against the Gold Coast Titans.
