= Green and Gold Rugby =

- Website type: Sports News and Community
- Available in: English
- Owners: Green and Gold Rugby Pty Ltd
- Editor: Matthew Rowley
- Website: www.greenandgoldrugby.com
- Commercial: Yes
- Registration: 2007

Green and Gold Rugby (GAGR) is an Australian website and blog focused on rugby union in Australia. The website describes itself as being: "for passionate followers of Australian rugby." The website also operates a podcast that mainly cover the Super Rugby, the Australia national rugby team (Wallabies), and the Australia national women's rugby team (Wallaroos). The website contributors are volunteers.

== History ==
Green and Gold Rugby was founded as a Blogger property by Matt Rowley as an outlet to cover the 2007 Rugby World Cup on 25 May 2007.

The Green and Gold Rugby domain was registered on 20 August 2007, then moved to its own domain, http://www.greenandgoldrugby.com, and migrated to self-hosted WordPress in 2008.

An Australian rugby forum known as "The Yellow Scarf", created by Russell Daylight, was merged with Green and Gold Rugby, augmenting the blog with an active forum community on 18 March 2009.

A podcast was launched in November 2010, and celebrated its 100th episode in May 2013

In 2011 Green and Gold Rugby received media accreditation with the Australian Rugby Union and all five Super Rugby provinces.

A Wiki to become known as the Ruggapedia was launched on 18 December 2011.

== In the media ==
The site was ranked in The Telegraph's Top 20 Rugby Sites.

Writers for the Fairfax Brisbane Times and Sydney Morning Herald have referenced blog articles from Green and Gold Rugby. These include Queensland Reds rugby coach Ewen McKenzie.

Wayne Smith of The Australian has also referenced the site when quoting site contributor Bob Dwyer. Dwyer's blog posts for the site have received press coverage when discussing the Wallabies and the All Blacks.

In October 2010 the BBC.COM website referenced a blog article in relation to Matt Giteau's kicking statistics.

When looking at the Australian Rugby Union attendance figures Wayne Smith referenced the comments from the site when quoting "you wouldn't have seen so much padding (of figures) since your Year 10 formal."

== Famous contributors ==
Bob Dwyer was the Australian Wallabies coach from 1982–83, and again from 1988. He coached the Wallabies to victory at the 1991 Rugby World Cup. Bob has written 97 articles for Green and Gold Rugby

Julian Huxley played 9 tests for Australia in 2007 scoring 22 points.

Nic White has played for the Brumbies since 2011.

Peter Slattery is a former World Cup winning Wallaby and QLD Reds Captain.

Steve Kefu has 6 Wallaby caps to his name, and stints in the Super Rugby, Top 14, Premiership and Heineken Cup competitions.

== See also ==
- The Roar
