= List of Gold Coast Titans players =

This article lists all rugby league footballers who have played first-grade for the Gold Coast Titans in the National Rugby League.

Notes:

- Debut:
  - Players are listed in the order of their debut game with the club.
  - Players that debuted in the same game are added in the order of their jersey number.
- Appearances: Gold Coast Titans games only, not a total of their career games. E.g. Preston Campbell has played a career total of 267 first-grade games but of those, 103 were at the Gold Coast.
- Previous Club: refers to the previous first-grade rugby league club (NRL or Super League) the player played at and does not refer to any junior club, Rugby Union club or a rugby league club he was signed to but never played at.
- The statistics in this table are correct as of the end of the 2026 NRL season.

== List of players ==
Cap no.	Name	Nationality	Titans career	Debut round	Previous club	Position	Appearances	Tries	Goals	Field goals	Points
1	Preston Campbell	(Australia)	2007–11	Rd. 1	Penrith Panthers	Fullback	103	15	35	0	130
2	Lelea Paea	(Australia) (Tonga)	2007	Rd. 1	Sydney Roosters	Wing	6	0	0	0	0
3	Mat Rogers	(Australia)	2007–11	Rd. 1	Cronulla-Sutherland Sharks	Five-eighth	77	32	59	2	248
4	Jake Webster	(Australia) (New Zealand)	2007	Rd. 1	Melbourne Storm	Wing	18	4	0	0	16
5	Chris Walker	(Australia)	2007, 2009	Rd. 1	Melbourne Storm	Wing	20	10	3	0	46
6	Matt Hilder	(Australia)	2007	Rd. 1	Cronulla-Sutherland Sharks	Five-eighth	19	1	0	0	4
7	Scott Prince	(Australia)	2007–12	Rd. 1	Wests Tigers	Halfback	124	32	293	5	719
8	Luke Bailey	(Australia)	2007–14	Rd. 1	St. George Illawarra Dragons	Prop	150	13	0	0	52
9	Clint Amos	(Australia)	2007–08	Rd. 1	North Queensland Cowboys	Hooker	21	0	0	0	0
10	Kris Kahler	(Australia)	2007	Rd. 1	Canberra Raiders	Prop	15	0	0	0	0
11	Anthony Laffranchi	(Australia) (Italy)	2007–11	Rd. 1	Wests Tigers	Second-row	102	32	1	0	130
12	Gavin Cooper	(Australia)	2007–08	Rd. 1	North Queensland Cowboys	Second-row	36	3	0	0	12
13	Luke Swain	(Australia)	2007–08	Rd. 1	Penrith Panthers	Lock	34	1	0	0	4
14	Michael Henderson	(Australia)	2007–12	Rd. 1	St. George Illawarra Dragons	Prop	78	3	0	0	12
15	James Stosic	(New Zealand) (Serbia)	2007–08	Rd. 1	Cronulla-Sutherland Sharks	Prop	23	0	0	0	0
16	Mark Minichiello	(Australia) (Italy)	2007–14	Rd. 1	South Sydney Rabbitohs	Second-row	173	32	0	0	128
17	Nathan Friend	(Australia)	2007–11, 2016	Rd. 1	Melbourne Storm	Hooker	121	7	0	0	28
18	Matthew Petersen	(Australia) (United States)	2007–08	Rd. 2	Parramatta Eels	Wing	21	14	0	0	56
19	Josh Graham	(Australia)	2007–10	Rd. 2	Melbourne Storm	Centre	50	4	0	0	16
20	Brett Delaney	(Australia)	2007–09	Rd. 4	Parramatta Eels	Centre	63	14	19	0	94
21	Brad Meyers	(Australia)	2007–11	Rd. 4	Bradford Bulls	Prop	75	11	0	0	44
22	Michael Hodgson	(Australia)	2007–08	Rd. 6	Canberra Raiders	Prop	35	1	0	0	4
23	Richard Mathers	(England)	2007	Rd. 8	Leeds Rhinos	Fullback	6	0	0	0	0
24	Smith Samau	(New Zealand) (Samoa)	2007–08	Rd. 10	Melbourne Storm	Wing	10	1	0	0	4
25	Josh Lewis	(Australia)	2007–08	Rd. 11	Sydney Roosters	Five-eighth	13	4	0	1	17
26	David Myles	(Australia) (United States)	2007	Rd. 12	North Queensland Cowboys	Five-eighth	2	0	0	0	0
27	Ian Donnelly	(Australia)	2007	Rd. 14	Melbourne Storm	Prop	12	1	0	0	4
28	Luke O'Dwyer	(Australia)	2007–13	Rd. 15	Parramatta Eels	Centre	102	19	0	0	76
29	Daniel Conn	(Australia)	2007–09	Rd. 18	Canterbury-Bankstown Bulldogs	Second-row	28	1	0	0	4
30	Ben Jeffery	(Australia)	2008	Rd. 1	Wests Tigers	Wing	19	6	0	0	24
31	Jordan Atkins	(Australia)	2008–10, 2013	Rd. 1	Debut	Wing	30	8	0	0	32
32	Ashley Harrison	(Australia)	2008–14	Rd. 1	Sydney Roosters	Lock	117	12	0	0	48
33	Aaron Cannings	(New Zealand) (Tonga)	2008–10	Rd. 1	Parramatta Eels	Prop	30	3	0	0	12
34	Brenton Bowen	(Australia)	2008	Rd. 7	North Queensland Cowboys	Wing	5	2	0	0	8
35	Shannon Walker	(Australia)	2008, 2010	Rd. 10	Debut	Fullback	4	0	0	0	0
36	Esikeli Tonga	(Australia) (Tonga)	2008–09, 2011	Rd. 12	Debut	Centre	36	10	0	0	40
37	Brad Davis	(Australia)	2008	Rd. 13	Debut	Halfback	6	0	0	0	0
38	Will Matthews	(Australia)	2008–11, 2018–19	Rd. 16	Debut	Prop	50	1	0	0	4
39	Jordan Rapana	(New Zealand) (Cook Islands)	2008	Rd. 18	Debut	Wing	5	5	0	0	20
40	Matthew Cross	(Australia)	2008	Rd. 18	Penrith Panthers	Prop	3	0	0	0	0
41	Jordan Rankin	(Australia)	2008, 2011–13	Rd. 22	Debut	Fullback	17	1	0	0	4
42	Selasi Berdie	(Australia)	2008–09	Rd. 26	Debut	Prop	2	0	0	0	0
43	Billy Ngawini	(New Zealand)	2008	Rd. 26	Canterbury-Bankstown Bulldogs	Hooker	1	0	0	0	0
44	Matthew White	(Australia)	2009–12, 2014–15	Rd. 1	Newcastle Knights	Prop	125	1	0	0	4
45	William Zillman	(Australia)	2009–17	Rd. 1	Canberra Raiders	Fullback	156	42	0	1	169
46	Kevin Gordon	(Australia) (Philippines)	2009–15	Rd. 3	Debut	Wing	118	58	17	0	266
47	Bodene Thompson	(New Zealand)	2009–12	Rd. 9	Debut	Second-row	49	9	0	0	36
48	David Mead	(Papua New Guinea) (Australia)	2009–16	Rd. 13	Debut	Wing	147	67	0	0	268
49	Sam Tagataese	(New Zealand) (Samoa)	2009–11	Rd. 17	Melbourne Storm	Second-row	33	4	0	0	16
50	Kayne Lawton	(Australia)	2009–12	Rd. 20	Debut	Hooker	7	0	0	0	0
51	Joe Tomane	(New Zealand) (Samoa)	2010–11	Rd. 1	Melbourne Storm	Centre	14	9	0	0	36
52	Greg Bird	(Australia)	2010–16	Rd. 1	Catalans Dragons	Second-row	129	17	19	2	108
53	Riley Brown	(Australia)	2010–11	Rd. 1	Sydney Roosters	Hooker	9	0	0	0	0
54	Clinton Toopi	(New Zealand)	2010–11	Rd. 7	Leeds Rhinos	Centre	27	6	0	0	24
55	Ryan James	(Australia)	2010–19	Rd. 14	Debut	Prop	144	30	0	0	120
56	Steven Michaels	(Australia)	2010–14	Rd. 20	Brisbane Broncos	Wing	60	24	0	0	96
57	Ben Ridge	(Australia)	2010–15	Rd. 20	Debut	Second-row	58	1	0	0	4
58	Luke Capewell	(Australia)	2011	Rd. 1	South Sydney Rabbitohs	Fullback	7	1	0	0	4
59	Matt Srama	(Australia) (Philippines)	2011–15	Rd. 12	Debut	Hooker	65	7	0	0	28
60	Brenton Lawrence	(Australia)	2011–12	Rd. 16	Debut	Prop	18	2	0	0	8
61	Beau Henry	(Australia)	2011, 2013–14	Rd. 20	Newcastle Knights	Five-eighth	8	0	9	0	18
62	Dominique Peyroux	(New Zealand) (Cook Islands) (Samoa)	2011–12	Rd. 21	Debut	Centre	16	3	0	0	12
63	Jamal Idris	(Australia)	2012–13	Rd. 1	Canterbury-Bankstown Bulldogs	Centre	35	9	0	0	36
64	Nate Myles	(Australia)	2012–15	Rd. 1	Sydney Roosters	Prop	75	3	0	0	12
65	Luke Douglas	(Australia) (Scotland)	2012–16	Rd. 1	Cronulla-Sutherland Sharks	Prop	117	4	0	0	16
66	Beau Champion	(Australia)	2012	Rd. 3	Melbourne Storm	Centre	9	4	0	0	16
67	Aidan Sezer	(Australia)	2012–15	Rd. 7	Debut	Five-eighth	71	12	156	5	365
68	Phil Graham	(Australia)	2012	Rd. 9	Sydney Roosters	Centre	2	0	0	0	0
69	Jamie Dowling	(Australia)	2012–13	Rd. 14	Debut	Centre	10	1	0	0	4
70	Beau Falloon	(Australia)	2012–15	Rd. 19	South Sydney Rabbitohs	Hooker	60	6	0	0	24
71	Brad Takairangi	(Australia) (Cook Islands)	2013–14	Rd. 1	Sydney Roosters	Centre	39	8	0	0	32
72	Albert Kelly	(Australia)	2013–14	Rd. 1	Cronulla-Sutherland Sharks	Halfback	33	16	0	0	64
73	David Taylor	(Australia)	2013–15	Rd. 1	South Sydney Rabbitohs	Second-row	58	15	0	0	60
74	Anthony Don	(Australia)	2013–21	Rd. 6	Debut	Wing	152	85	0	0	340
75	Sam Irwin	(Australia)	2013	Rd. 6	Debut	Hooker	10	0	0	0	0
76	Mark Ioane	(New Zealand)	2013—15	Rd. 8	Debut	Prop	24	0	0	0	0
77	Shane Gray	(Australia) (Philippines)	2013	Rd. 12	Debut	Second-row	1	0	0	0	0
78	Jahrome Hughes	(New Zealand)	2013	Rd. 17	Debut	Fullback	1	0	0	0	0
79	Hymel Hunt	(New Zealand)	2013	Rd. 17	Debut	Centre	1	0	0	0	0
80	Brad Tighe	(Australia)	2014–15	Rd. 1	Penrith Panthers	Centre	14	4	0	0	16
81	Maurice Blair	(Australia)	2014	Rd. 1	Melbourne Storm	Five-eighth	15	0	0	0	0
82	Paul Carter	(Australia)	2014	Rd. 1	Debut	Lock	21	1	0	0	4
83	Cody Nelson	(Australia)	2014	Rd. 8	Debut	Second-row	8	0	0	0	0
84	Kalifa Faifai Loa	(New Zealand) (Samoa)	2014–15	Rd. 10	North Queensland Cowboys	Wing	16	9	0	0	36
85	James Roberts	(Australia)	2014–15	Rd. 14	Penrith Panthers	Centre	36	21	1	0	86
86	Caleb Binge	(Australia)	2014	Rd. 14	Debut	Prop	2	0	0	0	0
87	Daniel Mortimer	(Australia)	2014–16	Rd. 15	Sydney Roosters	Halfback	35	1	3	0	10
88	Tom Kingston	(Australia)	2014	Rd. 17	Debut	Second-row	6	0	0	0	0
89	Josh Hoffman	(Australia) (New Zealand)	2015–16	Rd. 1	Brisbane Broncos	Fullback	49	14	0	0	56
90	Kierran Moseley	(Australia)	2015–16	Rd. 1	Penrith Panthers	Hooker	20	1	0	0	4
91	Eddy Pettybourne	(New Zealand) (United States) (Samoa)	2015–17	Rd. 1	Wigan Warriors	Prop	34	0	0	0	0
92	Matt Robinson	(New Zealand)	2015	Rd. 1	Penrith Panthers	Second-row	6	0	0	0	0
93	Agnatius Paasi	(Tonga)	2015–17	Rd. 1	New Zealand Warriors	Prop	54	7	0	0	28
94	Lachlan Burr	(Australia)	2015–16	Rd. 1	Canterbury-Bankstown Bulldogs	Lock	23	1	0	0	4
95	Ryan Simpkins	(Australia)	2015–18	Rd. 2	Penrith Panthers	Lock	25	0	0	0	0
96	Kane Elgey	(Australia)	2015–18	Rd. 4	Debut	Five-eighth	42	14	18	0	92
97	Nene Macdonald	(Papua New Guinea) (Australia)	2015–16	Rd. 15	Sydney Roosters	Wing	34	14	0	0	56
98	Chad Redman	(Australia)	2015	Rd. 15	Newcastle Knights	Hooker	5	0	0	0	0
99	Nathaniel Peteru	(New Zealand)	2015–17	Rd. 18	Debut	Prop	22	1	0	0	4
100	David Hala	(Australia) (Tonga)	2015	Rd. 22	Brisbane Broncos	Prop	2	0	0	0	0
101	Leva Li	(Australia)	2015	Rd. 23	Debut	Wing	1	0	0	0	0
102	Nathan Davis	(Australia)	2016	Rd. 1	Debut	Centre	8	1	0	0	4
103	Tyrone Roberts	(Australia)	2016–17, 2019–20	Rd. 1	Newcastle Knights	Five-eighth	59	14	82	0	220
104	Ashley Taylor	(Australia)	2016–21	Rd. 1	Brisbane Broncos	Halfback	114	18	130	3	335
105	David Shillington	(Australia)	2016	Rd. 1	Canberra Raiders	Prop	11	1	0	0	4
106	Zeb Taia	(Australia) (Cook Islands) (New Zealand)	2016	Rd. 1	Catalans Dragons	Second-row	24	5	0	0	20
107	Chris McQueen	(Australia) (England)	2016–17	Rd. 1	South Sydney Rabbitohs	Second-row	38	11	0	0	44
108	Leivaha Pulu	(New Zealand)	2016–17	Rd. 1	Debut	Second-row	45	5	0	0	20
109	John Olive	(Australia)	2016–17	Rd. 1	South Sydney Rabbitohs	Centre	9	2	0	0	8
110	Cameron Cullen	(Australia)	2016	Rd. 6	Debut	Five-eighth	5	2	0	0	8
111	Nathan Peats	(Australia)	2016–20	Rd. 11	Parramatta Eels	Hooker	70	2	0	0	8
112	Konrad Hurrell	(Tonga) (New Zealand)	2016–18	Rd. 14	New Zealand Warriors	Centre	35	13	0	0	52
113	Karl Lawton	(Australia)	2016–17	Rd. 17	Debut	Centre	12	2	0	0	8
114	Jarryd Hayne	(Australia) (Fiji)	2016–17	Rd. 22	Parramatta Eels	Fullback	23	8	0	1	33
115	Joe Greenwood	(England)	2017	Rd. 1	St Helens R.F.C.	Second-row	23	4	0	0	16
116	Kevin Proctor	(New Zealand)	2017–22	Rd. 1	Melbourne Storm	Second-row	104	18	1	0	74
117	Dan Sarginson	(Australia) (England)	2017	Rd. 1	Wigan Warriors	Centre	5	0	0	0	0
118	Jarrod Wallace	(Australia)	2017–22	Rd. 1	Brisbane Broncos	Prop	118	15	0	0	60
119	Tyronne Roberts-Davis	(Australia)	2017–18	Rd. 2	Debut	Wing	7	2	0	0	8
120	Tyler Cornish	(Australia)	2017	Rd. 3	Debut	Fullback	1	1	0	0	4
121	Max King	(Australia)	2017–19	Rd. 3	Debut	Prop	38	1	0	0	4
122	Dale Copley	(Australia)	2017–20	Rd. 4	Sydney Roosters	Centre	57	20	0	0	80
123	Daniel Vidot	(Australia) (Samoa)	2017	Rd. 4	Salford Red Devils	Wing	3	2	0	0	8
124	Morgan Boyle	(Australia)	2017–18	Rd. 5	Debut	Second-row	22	1	0	0	4
125	Chris Grevsmuhl	(Australia)	2017	Rd. 5	South Sydney Rabbitohs	Second-row	4	1	0	0	4
126	Paterika Vaivai	(Samoa)	2017	Rd. 5	Newcastle Knights	Prop	10	1	0	0	4
127	Pat Politoni	(Australia) (Tonga)	2017	Rd. 15	Cronulla-Sutherland Sharks	Hooker	4	2	0	0	8
128	Jamal Fogarty	(Australia)	2017, 2020–21	Rd. 16	Debut	Five-eighth	41	7	79	0	186
129	Ben Nakubuwai	(Australia) (Fiji)	2017	Rd. 24	Debut	Prop	2	1	0	0	4
130	Phillip Sami	(Australia) (Samoa)	2017–	Rd. 24	Debut	Wing	153	76	0	0	304
131	Keegan Hipgrave	(Australia)	2017–20	Rd. 26	Debut	Prop	40	3	0	0	12
132	Jai Arrow	(Australia)	2018–20	Rd. 1	Brisbane Broncos	Lock	56	4	0	0	16
133	Bryce Cartwright	(Australia)	2018–20	Rd. 1	Penrith Panthers	Second-row	44	3	0	0	12
134	Michael Gordon	(Australia)	2018–19	Rd. 1	Sydney Roosters	Fullback	36	7	85	0	198
135	Leilani Latu	(Australia) (Tonga)	2018–19	Rd. 1	Penrith Panthers	Prop	9	0	0	0	0
136	Mitch Rein	(Australia)	2018–21	Rd. 1	Penrith Panthers	Hooker	71	8	0	0	32
137	Jack Stockwell	(Australia)	2018–19	Rd. 6	Newcastle Knights	Prop	30	1	0	0	4
138	Brendan Elliot	(Australia)	2018	Rd. 8	Newcastle Knights	Centre	3	0	0	0	0
139	Moeaki Fotuaika	(New Zealand)	2018–	Rd. 9	Debut	Prop	174	6	0	0	24
140	Brenko Lee	(Australia) (Tonga)	2018–19	Rd. 10	Canterbury-Bankstown Bulldogs	Centre	20	5	0	0	20
141	Alexander Brimson	(Australia)	2018–	Rd. 10	Debut	Fullback	145	57	0	0	228
142	Jai Whitbread	(Australia)	2018–21	Rd. 18	Brisbane Broncos	Prop	30	0	0	0	0
143	Shannon Boyd	(Australia)	2019–20	Rd. 1	Canberra Raiders	Prop	14	0	0	0	0
144	Brian Kelly	(Australia)	2019–25	Rd. 1	Manly Warringah Sea Eagles	Centre	143	51	11	0	226
145	Tyrone Peachey	(Australia)	2019–21	Rd. 1	Penrith Panthers	Centre	63	8	6	0	44
146	Ryley Jacks	(Australia)	2019	Rd. 2	Melbourne Storm	Halfback	13	4	0	0	16
147	Jesse Arthars	(Australia)	2019	Rd. 9	Debut	Centre	12	2	0	0	8
148	Sam Stone	(Australia)	2019–21	Rd. 18	Newcastle Knights	Second-row	21	3	0	0	12
149	Kallum Watkins	(England)	2019–20	Rd. 19	Leeds Rhinos	Centre	8	0	0	0	0
150	Tanah Boyd	(Australia)	2019–24	Rd. 24	Debut	Halfback, Five-eighth	69	9	108	3	255
151	Sam Lisone	(New Zealand)	2020–22	Rd. 1	New Zealand Warriors	Prop	48	2	0	0	8
152	Jaimin Jolliffe	(Australia)	2020–	Rd. 1	Debut	Prop	102	6	0	0	24
153	Erin Clark	(New Zealand)	2020–24	Rd. 3	New Zealand Warriors	Hooker	94	5	0	0	20
154	Jonus Pearson	(Australia)	2020–21	Rd. 3	St. George Illawarra Dragons	Wing	2	0	0	0	0
155	Young Tonumaipea	(Samoa)	2020	Rd. 4	Melbourne Storm	Centre	10	3	0	0	12
156	Corey Thompson	(Australia)	2020–22	Rd. 6	Wests Tigers	Wing	43	13	0	0	52
157	Beau Fermor	(Australia)	2020–	Rd. 8	Debut	Second-row, Centre	103	32	1	0	130
158	Treymain Spry	(Australia)	2020	Rd. 9	Debut	Wing	5	1	0	0	4
159	Tino Fa'asuamaleaui	(Samoa) (Australia)	2021–	Rd. 1	Melbourne Storm	Lock, Prop	94	17	0	0	68
160	David Fifita	(Australia)	2021–25	Rd. 1	Brisbane Broncos	Second-row	90	37	0	0	148
161	Patrick Herbert	(New Zealand)	2021–22	Rd. 1	New Zealand Warriors	Centre	38	7	0	0	28
162	Sam McIntyre	(Australia)	2021–23	Rd. 7	Wests Tigers	Second-row	25	1	0	0	4
163	Herman Ese'ese	(New Zealand) (Samoa)	2021–22	Rd. 8	Newcastle Knights	Prop, Lock	16	2	0	0	8
164	Esan Marsters	(Cook Islands) (New Zealand)	2021–22	Rd. 9	North Queensland Cowboys	Centre	10	2	0	0	8
165	Jayden Campbell	(Australia)	2021–	Rd. 13	Debut	Fullback	87	30	129	0	378
166	Greg Marzhew	(New Zealand)	2021–22	Rd. 13	Debut	Wing	25	15	0	0	60
167	Joseph Vuna	(United States)	2021–23	Rd. 13	New Zealand Warriors	Second-row	11	1	0	0	4
168	Toby Sexton	(Australia)	2021–23	Rd. 19	Debut	Halfback	24	4	41	0	98
169	Isaac Liu	(Samoa) (New Zealand)	2022–24	Rd. 1	Sydney Roosters	Prop, Second-row	69	1	0	0	4
170	Will Smith	(Australia)	2022	Rd. 1	Parramatta Eels	Five-eighth	9	0	0	0	0
171	Jamayne Isaako	(New Zealand)	2022	Rd. 4	Brisbane Broncos	Fullback, Wing	11	3	15	0	42
172	Paul Turner	(New Zealand)	2022	Rd. 14	New Zealand Warriors	Five-eighth	7	1	0	0	4
173	Aaron Booth	(Australia)	2022	Rd. 18	Melbourne Storm	Hooker	4	0	0	0	0
174	Sosefo Fifita	(New Zealand)	2022–	Rd. 18	Debut	Wing	68	32	0	0	128
175	Klese Haas	(Australia)	2022–	Rd. 24	Debut	Second-row	70	6	0	0	24
176	Kieran Foran	(New Zealand)	2023–25	Rd. 1	Manly Warringah Sea Eagles	Five-eighth	56	9	0	1	37
177	Alofiana Khan-Pereira	(Australia)	2023–25	Rd. 1	Debut	Wing	54	53	0	0	212
178	Aaron Schoupp	(Australia)	2023–24	Rd. 1	Canterbury-Bankstown Bulldogs	Centre	20	2	7	0	22
179	Joe Stimson	(Australia)	2023–24	Rd. 1	Canterbury-Bankstown Bulldogs	Second-row, Prop	29	2	0	0	8
180	Sam Verrills	(Australia)	2023–	Rd. 1	Sydney Roosters	Hooker	64	5	0	0	20
181	Chris Randall	(Australia)	2023–	Rd. 2	Newcastle Knights	Hooker	78	10	0	0	40
182	Iszac Fa'asuamaleaui	(Australia)	2023–25	Rd. 3	Debut	Prop	28	1	0	0	4
183	Kruise Leeming	(Eswatini) (England)	2023	Rd. 6	Leeds Rhinos	Hooker	10	2	0	0	8
184	Thomas Mikaele	(New Zealand)	2023	Rd. 9	Warrington Wolves	Prop, Lock	1	0	0	0	0
185	Keano Kini	(New Zealand)	2023–	Rd. 10	Debut	Fullback, Wing	39	7	4	0	36
186	Jacob Alick-Wiencke	(Papua New Guinea)	2023–25	Rd. 19	Debut	Lock	19	0	0	0	0
187	Tom Weaver	(Australia)	2023–25	Rd. 25	Debut	Five-eighth	11	0	10	0	20
188	Keenan Palasia	(Samoa)	2024	Rd. 1	Brisbane Broncos	Second-row, Prop	15	3	0	0	12
189	Josiah Pahulu	(New Zealand) (Samoa)	2024–25	Rd. 5	Debut	Prop, Lock	22	1	0	0	4
190	Harley Smith-Shields	(Australia)	2024	Rd. 5	Canberra Raiders	Centre, Wing	5	1	0	0	4
191	Tony Francis	(Australia)	2024–	Rd. 12	Debut	Centre, Wing	10	1	0	0	4
192	Jaylan De Groot	(Australia)	2024–	Rd. 26	Debut	Fullback, Wing	20	6	0	0	24
193	Arama Hau	(Australia)	2024–	Rd. 27	Featherstone Rovers	Second-row	19	5	0	0	20
194	Reagan Campbell-Gillard	(Australia)	2025	Rd. 2	Parramatta Eels	Prop	24	0	0	0	0
195	Brock Gray	(Australia)	2025–	Rd. 2	Debut	Prop, Second-row	6	0	0	0	0
196	Sean Mullany	(New Zealand)	2025–	Rd. 5	Debut	Hooker, Lock	3	0	0	0	0
197	Allan Fitzgibbon	(New Zealand)	2025–	Rd. 6	Debut	Wing	6	2	0	0	8
198	Josh Patston	(Australia)	2025–	Rd. 15	Debut	Second-row	11	1	0	0	4
199	Tukimihia Simpkins	(New Zealand)	2025–	Rd. 15	Wests Tigers	Prop	4	0	0	0	0
200	Cooper Bai	(Australia) (Papua New Guinea)	2025–	Rd. 27	Debut	Lock	12	2	0	0	8
201	Carter Gordon	(Australia)	2025	Rd. 27	Debut	Five-eighth, Halfback	1	0	0	0	0
202	Sialetili Faeamani	(New Zealand)	2026–	Rd. 1	Debut	Wing, Centre	8	4	0	0	16
203	Max Feagai	(New Zealand)	2026–	Rd. 1	Dolphins	Wing, Centre	8	4	0	0	16
204	Lachlan Ilias	(Australia) (Greece)	2026–	Rd. 1	St. George Illawarra Dragons	Halfback	8	0	4	0	8
205	Kurtis Morrin	(Australia)	2026–	Rd. 1	Canterbury-Bankstown Bulldogs	Prop, Lock	11	3	0	0	12
206	Luke Sommerton	(Australia)	2026–	Rd. 2	Penrith Panthers	Hooker	11	3	0	0	12
207	Oliver Pascoe	(Australia)	2026–	Rd. 4	Debut	Hooker	8	1	1	0	6
208	Adam Christensen	(Australia)	2026–	Rd. 6	Debut	Second-row	1	0	0	0	0
209	Zane Harrison	(Australia)	2026–	Rd. 10	Debut	Halfback	3	0	0	0	0
210	Jensen Taumoepeau	(New Zealand)	2026–	Rd. 10	Debut	Wing	3	0	0	0	0
211	Jett Liu	(Australia)	2026–	Rd. 15	Debut	Prop	2	0	0	0	0
212	Dean Ieremia	(Samoa)	2026–	Rd. 19	Melbourne Storm	Wing	5	1	0	0	4
213	Bodhi Sharpley	(Australia)	2026–	R.24	Debut	Lock	3	1	0	0	4
