= 2008 Gold Coast Titans season =

Coordinates: 28°4′1″S 153°22′44″E

- NRL Rank: 13th
- 2008 record: Wins: 10; draws: 0; losses: 14
- Points scored: For: 476; against: 586

Team information
- CEO: Michael Searle
- Coach: John Cartwright
- Captain: Luke Bailey Scott Prince
- Stadium: Skilled Park
- Avg. attendance: 21,618
- High attendance: 27,176

Top scorers
- Tries: Anthony Laffranchi (12)
- Goals: Scott Prince (51)
- Points: Scott Prince (124)
← 2007	List of seasons	2009 →

The 2008 Gold Coast Titans season was the 2nd in the club's history. They competed in the NRL's 2008 Telstra Premiership coached by John Cartwright and co-captained by Luke Bailey and Scott Prince. After 10 rounds of the premiership the Titans found themselves leading the competition with 7 wins from 9 games before slumping to finish the regular season 13th (out of 16) and failing to make the finals. Preston Campbell was awarded the Paul Broughton Medal for the club's player of the year.

== Summary ==
=== Milestones ===
- Round 1: Four players made their debuts for the club; Jordan Atkins, Aaron Cannings, Ashley Harrison and Ben Jeffery. Jordan Atkins also made his NRL debut.
- Round 1: Jordan Atkins broke the club record for most tries scored by an individual in a single match.
- Round 2: Nathan Friend scored his 1st career try.
- Round 4: Daniel Conn scored his 1st career try.
- Round 7: Brenton Bowen made his debut for the club, after previously playing for the North Queensland Cowboys.
- Round 10: Shannon Walker made his debut for the club and his debut in the NRL.
- Round 12: Esikeli Tonga made his debut for the club and his debut in the NRL.
- Round 12: Brett Delaney played his 50th career game.
- Round 13: Brad Davis made his debut for the club and his debut in the NRL.
- Round 15: Mat Rogers played his 150th career game.
- Round 16: Will Matthews made his debut for the club and his debut in the NRL.
- Round 17: Brenton Bowen and Luke O'Dwyer played their 50th career game.
- Round 18: Michael Henderson played his 50th career game.
- Round 18: Two players made their debuts for the club; Matthew Cross and Jordan Rapana. Jordan Rapana also made his NRL debut and scored his 1st career try.
- Round 21: Preston Campbell played his 200th career game.
- Round 22: Jordan Rankin made his debut for the club and his debut in the NRL.
- Round 23: Michael Hodgson played his 150th career game and Esikeli Tonga scored his 1st career try.
- Round 26: Two players made their debuts for the club; Selasi Berdie and Billy Ngawini. Selasi Berdie also made his NRL debut.

== Squad list ==
Gold Coast Titans
First team squad			Coaching staff
Clint Amos – HK; Jordan Atkins – WG; Luke Bailey (c) – PR; Selasi Berdie – PR, SR; Brenton Bowen – WG; Preston Campbell – FB; Aaron Cannings – PR; Daniel Conn – SR; Gavin Cooper – CE, SR; Matthew Cross – PR, SR; Brad Davis – HK; Brett Delaney – CE; Ian Donnelly – PR	Nathan Friend – HK; Josh Graham – CE, LK; Ashley Harrison – LK; Michael Henderson – PR; Michael Hodgson – PR; Ben Jeffery – WG; Kris Kahler – SR; Anthony Laffranchi – SR; Josh Lewis – FE, HB; Will Matthews – PR; Brad Meyers – PR; Mark Minichiello – SR; Billy Ngawini – HB, HK	Luke O'Dwyer – CE, LK; Matthew Petersen – WG (Mid-season loss); Scott Prince (c) – HB; Jordan Rankin – FE, HB; Jordan Rapana – WG; Mat Rogers – CE, FE; Smith Samau – WG; James Stosic – PR; Luke Swain – SR; Esikeli Tonga – WG, CE; Chris Walker – WG, CE; Shannon Walker – FB	Head coach: John Cartwright; Legend: (c) Captain(s); (vc) Vice-captain(s); Updated: {{{date}}} Source(s): Titans 2008 Squad

== Squad movement ==
=== Gains ===
Players	Previous club	Until End of	Notes
Brenton Bowen	North Queensland Cowboys	2009	
Aaron Cannings	Parramatta Eels	2010	
Matthew Cross	Penrith Panthers	2009	
Ashley Harrison	Sydney Roosters	2010	
Ben Jeffery	Wests Tigers	2009	
Billy Ngawini	Bulldogs	2008	

=== Losses ===
Players	Club	Until End of	Notes
Matt Hilder	Newcastle Knights	2009	
Richard Mathers	Wigan Warriors	2010	
David Myles	Retired		
Lelea Paea	Released		
Matthew Petersen	Wakefield Trinity Wildcats (Mid-season)	2010	
Jake Webster	Hull Kingston Rovers	2010	

=== Re-signings ===
Players	Club	Until End of	Notes
Preston Campbell	Gold Coast Titans	2009	
Nathan Friend	Gold Coast Titans	2009	
Josh Graham	Gold Coast Titans	2010	
Michael Henderson	Gold Coast Titans	2012	
Anthony Laffranchi	Gold Coast Titans	2011	
Will Matthews	Gold Coast Titans	2011	
Brad Meyers	Gold Coast Titans	2010	
Jordan Rankin	Gold Coast Titans	2011	
Shannon Walker	Gold Coast Titans	2010	

== Ladder ==
2008 NRL season
Pos	Team	Pld	W	D	L	B	PF	PA	PD	Pts
1	Melbourne Storm	24	17	0	7	2	584	282	+302	38
2	Manly Warringah Sea Eagles (P)	24	17	0	7	2	645	355	+290	38
3	Cronulla-Sutherland Sharks	24	17	0	7	2	451	384	+67	38
4	Sydney Roosters	24	15	0	9	2	511	446	+65	34
5	Brisbane Broncos	24	14	1	9	2	560	452	+108	33
6	Canberra Raiders	24	13	0	11	2	640	527	+113	30
7	St George Illawarra Dragons	24	13	0	11	2	489	378	+111	30
8	New Zealand Warriors	24	13	0	11	2	502	567	-65	30
9	Newcastle Knights	24	12	0	12	2	516	486	+30	28
10	Wests Tigers	24	11	0	13	2	528	560	-32	26
11	Parramatta Eels	24	11	0	13	2	501	547	-46	26
12	Penrith Panthers	24	10	1	13	2	504	611	-107	25
13	Gold Coast Titans	24	10	0	14	2	476	586	-110	24
14	South Sydney Rabbitohs	24	8	0	16	2	453	666	-213	20
15	North Queensland Cowboys	24	5	0	19	2	474	638	-164	14
16	Canterbury-Bankstown Bulldogs	24	5	0	19	2	433	782	-349	14

== Fixtures ==
=== Regular season ===
Date	Round	Opponent	Venue	Score	Tries	Goals	Attendance
Friday, 14 March	Round 1	North Queensland Cowboys	Skilled Park	36 – 18	Atkins (4), Bailey, Laffranchi	Prince (6/8)	26,974
Monday, 24 March	Round 2	St. George Illawarra Dragons	WIN Stadium	12 – 30	Friend, Minichiello	Prince (2/2)	10,521
Saturday, 29 March	Round 3	Cronulla-Sutherland Sharks	Skilled Park	18 – 4	Rogers, Meyers, Atkins	Prince (3/3), Jeffery (0/1)	19,050
Saturday, 5 April	Round 4	Canberra Raiders	Skilled Park	32 – 12	Bailey, O'Dwyer, Laffranchi, Conn, Jeffery, Minichiello	Prince (4/7)	17,381
Friday, 11 April	Round 5	Parramatta Eels	Parramatta Stadium	28 – 20	Petersen, Cannings, Friend, Prince, Graham	Prince (4/5)	13,321
Friday, 18 April	Round 6	Brisbane Broncos	Skilled Park	26 – 24	Petersen (3), Harrison, Laffranchi	Prince (3/5)	27,176
Sunday, 27 April	Round 7	New Zealand Warriors	Skilled Park	36 – 24	Harrison, Jeffery, Meyers, Campbell, Laffranchi, Bowen	Prince (6/7)	25,310
Saturday, 3 May	Round 8	Newcastle Knights	EnergyAustralia Stadium	12 – 13	Prince, Minichiello	Prince (2/2)	21,280
	Round 9	Bye					
Friday, 16 May	Round 10	Canterbury-Bankstown Bulldogs	Skilled Park	24 – 20	Samau, Meyers, Luke O'Dwyer, Prince	Prince (4/5)	22,676
Sunday, 25 May	Round 11	Wests Tigers	Leichhardt Oval	18 – 20	Cannings, Bowen, Campbell	Prince (3/3)	17,493
Sunday, 1 June	Round 12	Cronulla-Sutherland Sharks	Toyota Stadium	14 – 30	Minichiello, O'Dwyer, Delaney	Prince (1/3)	8,214
Monday, 9 June	Round 13	Melbourne Storm	Skilled Park	18 – 0	Delaney, Meyers, Jeffery	Rogers (3/4)	19,409
	Round 14	Bye					
Monday, 23 June	Round 15	South Sydney Rabbitohs	ANZ Stadium	23 – 24	Laffranchi (2), Prince, Atkins	Prince (4/6)	9,827
Saturday, 28 June	Round 16	St. George Illawarra Dragons	Skilled Park	22 – 26	Jeffery, Delaney, O'Dwyer, Rogers	Rogers (3/5)	26,453
Friday, 4 July	Round 17	Manly-Warringah Sea Eagles	Skilled Park	14 – 34	Laffranchi (2)	Rogers (3/3)	21,374
Friday, 11 July	Round 18	Sydney Roosters	Sydney Football Stadium	32 – 28	Jeffery (2), Rapana (2), Rogers, Graham	Rogers (4/6)	10,762
Saturday, 19 July	Round 19	Penrith Panthers	Skilled Park	22 – 36	Rapana, O'Dwyer, Laffranchi, Hodgson	Rogers (3/4)	17,759
Saturday, 26 July	Round 20	Canberra Raiders	Canberra Stadium	4 – 46	Laffranchi	Davis (0/1)	8,700
Friday, 1 August	Round 21	Melbourne Storm	Olympic Park Stadium	4 – 44	Rapana	Rogers (0/1)	9,400
Monday, 11 August	Round 22	Newcastle Knights	Skilled Park	12 – 32	Rapana, Meyers	Campbell (2/2)	15,136
Saturday, 16 August	Round 23	North Queensland Cowboys	Dairy Farmers Stadium	26 – 20	Laffranchi (2), Rogers, Campbell, Tonga	Prince (3/5)	17,605
Friday, 22 August	Round 24	Brisbane Broncos	Suncorp Stadium	21 – 25	Campbell, Rogers, Josh Graham	Prince (4/4) & (FG)	39,757
Monday, 1 September	Round 25	Manly-Warringah Sea Eagles	Brookvale Oval	10 – 28	Cooper, Atkins	Prince (1/2)	14,755
Sunday, 7 September	Round 26	Wests Tigers	Skilled Park	12 – 28	Prince, Delaney	Prince (2/2)	20,723
Legend: Win Loss Draw Bye

== Statistics ==
Name	App	T	G	FG	Pts
Clint Amos	6	0	0	0	0
Jordan Atkins	14	7	0	0	28
Luke Bailey	9	2	0	0	8
Selasi Berdie	1	0	0	0	0
Brenton Bowen	5	2	0	0	8
Preston Campbell	21	4	2	0	20
Aaron Cannings	15	2	0	0	8
Daniel Conn	16	1	0	0	4
Gavin Cooper	14	1	0	0	4
Matthew Cross	3	0	0	0	0
Brad Davis	6	0	0	0	0
Brett Delaney	23	4	0	0	16
Nathan Friend	21	2	0	0	8
Josh Graham	23	3	0	0	12
Ashley Harrison	20	2	0	0	8
Michael Henderson	7	0	0	0	0
Michael Hodgson	22	1	0	0	4
Ben Jeffery	19	6	0	0	24
Anthony Laffranchi	20	12	0	0	48
Josh Lewis	2	0	0	0	0
Will Matthews	9	0	0	0	0
Brad Meyers	15	5	0	0	20
Mark Minichiello	16	4	0	0	16
Billy Ngawini	1	0	0	0	0
Luke O'Dwyer	21	5	0	0	20
Matthew Petersen	4	4	0	0	16
Scott Prince	16	5	51	2	124
Jordan Rankin	1	0	0	0	0
Jordan Rapana	5	5	0	0	20
Mat Rogers	17	5	16	0	52
Smith Samau	1	1	0	0	4
James Stosic	16	0	0	0	0
Luke Swain	11	0	0	0	0
Esikeli Tonga	5	1	0	0	4
Shannon Walker	3	0	0	0	0
Totals	—	84	69	2	476

Source: NRL 2008 - Gold Coast Titans Summary

== Representative honours ==
The following players played a representative match in 2008.

Australian Kangaroos

- Anthony Laffranchi
- Scott Prince

Mate Ma'a Tonga

- Esikeli Tonga

NSW Blues

- Anthony Laffranchi

NSW City Origin

- Brett Delaney
- Mark Minichiello

NSW Country Origin

- Anthony Laffranchi

Queensland Maroons

- Ashley Harrison
- Scott Prince

Toa Samoa

- Smith Samau
