= 2007 NRL season =

Rugby league competition

2007 National Rugby League
- Teams: 16
- Premiers: None
- Minor premiers: None
- Matches played: 201
- Points scored: 8539
- Average attendance: 16,578
- Total attendance: 3,332,114
- Top points scorer: Hazem El Masri (210)
- Wooden spoon: Penrith Panthers (4th spoon)
- Dally M Medal: Johnathan Thurston
- Top try-scorer: Matthew Bowen (22)

The 2007 NRL season was the one hundredth season of professional rugby league football club competition in Australia, and the tenth run by the National Rugby League. Sixteen teams contested the NRL's 2007 Telstra Premiership, and with the inclusion of a new team, the Gold Coast Titans, the competition was the largest run since the 1999 NRL season.

The Melbourne Storm were the minor premiers in 2007, six points clear of second-placed Manly Warringah Sea Eagles. The Storm eventually ran out 34–8 winners in the 2007 NRL Grand Final to claim the premiership. However, they were subsequently stripped of both their minor premiership and premiership titles on 22 April 2010, after they were found to be guilty of breaching the league's salary cap. The entire season was then retroactively declared null and void, with no minor premiership or premiership being awarded.

== Season summary ==
Pre-season, 2006 premiers the Brisbane Broncos travelled to England to play the Super League champions in the 2007 World Club Challenge.

The 2007 NRL Season kicked off on Friday 16 March 2007 with eight games to be played in each round. The 2007 season saw the return of Monday Night Football, which helped the NRL to set new first round aggregate attendance record of 174,475. The opening round also saw two matches at Brisbane's Suncorp Stadium, one featured reigning champions Brisbane playing fellow Queensland side the Cowboys, while the second match introduced the newest club to be admitted to the competition, the Gold Coast Titans.

The North Queensland Cowboys' Jason Smith was the NRL's oldest player in 2007 at 35 years and 186 days.

Teams had fewer byes in 2007 than in the 2006 competition. With an odd number of teams contesting between 2002 and 2006, the draw meant that at least one team would have to have a bye each weekend. With the inclusion of the 16th team for the 2007 season, the National Rugby League had the option of reverting to the system used between 2000 and 2001 in which every team played in each round. However, this option was not chosen. In 2007, teams had just a single bye during the year, grouped in periods that will assist clubs around representative fixtures.

The top eight was not settled until the final round as the Brisbane Broncos and Wests Tigers were both on 24 points in 8th and 9th position respectively, with the Broncos ahead on points differential. Both teams lost their final regular season match and as a result of this, the South Sydney Rabbitohs made the top eight for the first time since 1989. The New Zealand Warriors secured a home final: the second match in the history of the National Rugby League Finals played outside of Australia. The first was the Warriors' victory over the Canberra Raiders at Mt Smart Stadium while on their way to the 2002 Grand Final.

On the other end of the ladder, the Newcastle Knights and Penrith Panthers were both in contention for the Wooden Spoon – the traditional label for last place. The Knights performed well in their last match and denied the Wests Tigers a spot in the top eight, winning by two points, whereas the Panthers were defeated by the New Zealand Warriors, seeing them finish last.

The year 2007 saw a total of over 3 million spectators attend regular season matches for only the second time in history.

=== Records set ===
- The Brisbane Broncos recorded their biggest win in the club's history (65 points) with a 71–6 win over the Newcastle Knights at Suncorp Stadium in round 11. It's also the Newcastle Knights biggest ever loss.
- New Zealand Warriors prop forward Steve Price ran 4,515 metres with the ball in 2007, more than any other forward in history.

=== Advertising ===
The National Rugby League kept use of the Hoodoo Gurus' "That's My Team" for a fifth consecutive season, with their advertising agency MJW Hakuhodo reworking the track "What's My Scene" and the "That's My Dream" slogan. With a design change for the Telstra Premiership logo (after months of off-season deliberation on whether Telstra would sponsor the code again), the commercial was a fast-paced action clip, with key players from all teams superimposed to appear as if they are playing in front the famous landmarks of their team's area. They are as follows:

- Brisbane Broncos – Darren Lockyer in front of the Story Bridge.
- Bulldogs – Andrew Ryan and Luke Patten in Sydney Olympic Park.
- Canberra Raiders – Phil Graham in front of Parliament House.
- Cronulla-Sutherland Sharks – on the steps of North Cronulla Beach.
- Gold Coast Titans – Luke Bailey taking a hit-up on Surfers Paradise' Beach.
- Manly Warringah Sea Eagles – on the Manly Beach Boulevarde.
- Melbourne Storm – running across Federation Square.
- Newcastle Knights – Danny Buderus scoring a try on the Newcastle Waterfront.
- North Queensland Cowboys – streets of Townsville.
- New Zealand Warriors – Steve Price in front of the city skyline of Auckland.
- Parramatta Eels – Eric Grothe, Jr. running down Church Street.
- Penrith Panthers – players on Mulgoa Road.
- St George Illawarra Dragons – Mark Gasnier running along the Seacliff Drive.
- South Sydney Rabbitohs – Roy Asotasi taking a hitup in the Sydney Harbour Tunnel.
- Sydney Roosters – players in front of the pavilion at Bondi Beach.
- Wests Tigers – Robbie Farah in Sydney Olympic Park.

As with previous seasons, all team captains featured prominently in the ads, holding aloft the premiership trophy as the advertisement closes, replicating the 2006 equivalent. Only weeks after it was put to air, Newcastle Knights captain Andrew Johns' career was ended by a neck injury.

=== Sponsorship ===
Telecommunications giant Telstra once again held the naming rights to the premiership season and for the seventh season the competition was known as the "Telstra Premiership". For the second time, however, a change was made to the Telstra Premiership Logo to align with the telco's own new logo.

Spirit producers Bundaberg Rum sponsored Monday night football – as Bundaberg Monday Night Football. Electronics wholesaler Harvey Norman continued their support of the State of Origin Series, The insurer AAMI sponsored the City vs Country Origin.

== Teams ==
For the 2007 season, the number of teams in the NRL had increasing from fifteen to sixteen with the re-inclusion of a Gold Coast, Queensland-based club for the first since 1998, now as the Gold Coast Titans. It was the first time the number of Premiership teams had changed since 2002 when the re-inclusion of the South Sydney Rabbitohs saw the number of teams increase from 14 to 15. The Titans were the NRL's first expansion team since the Melbourne Storm, who entered the League in 1998.

The sixteen teams participated in the competition over the regular season, making it the largest it had been since 1999 when there were seventeen. Of the sixteen clubs, ten were from New South Wales (nine from Sydney's metropolitan area), three from Queensland and one from each of Victoria, the ACT and New Zealand.

There were only two foundation clubs from the 1908 New South Wales Rugby League season that played in this, the 100th season of the competition: the Sydney Roosters (formerly known as Eastern Suburbs) and the South Sydney Rabbitohs. Of these two clubs, only the Sydney Roosters played their 100th full season, as the South Sydney Rabbitohs were in recess during 2000 and 2001. Two foundation clubs, the Balmain Tigers and the Western Suburbs Magpies, had played in every year since 1908, but the two sides merged to create the Wests Tigers who competed every year since the merger in 2000.

Brisbane Broncos; 20th season Ground: Suncorp Stadium; Coach: Wayne Bennett; Captain: Darren Lockyer	Bulldogs; 73rd season Ground: Telstra Stadium; Coach: Steve Folkes; Captain: Andrew Ryan	Canberra Raiders; 26th season Ground: Canberra Stadium; Coach: Neil Henry; Captain: Alan Tongue	Cronulla-Sutherland Sharks; 41st season Ground: Toyota Stadium; Coach: Ricky Stuart; Captain: Brett Kimmorley
Gold Coast Titans; 1st season Ground: Carrara Stadium; Coach: John Cartwright; Captain: Scott Prince & Luke Bailey	Manly Warringah Sea Eagles; 58th season Ground: Brookvale Oval; Coach: Des Hasler; Captain: Matt Orford	Melbourne Storm; 10th season Ground Olympic Park Stadium; Coach: Craig Bellamy; Captain: Cameron Smith	New Zealand Warriors; 13th season Ground: Mt. Smart Stadium; Coach: Ivan Cleary; Captain: Steve Price
Newcastle Knights; 20th season Ground: EnergyAustralia Stadium; Coach: Brian Smith; Captain: Andrew Johns → Danny Buderus	North Queensland Cowboys; 13th season Ground: Dairy Farmers Stadium; Coach: Graham Murray; Captain: Johnathan Thurston	Parramatta Eels; 61st season Ground: Parramatta Stadium; Coach: Michael Hagan; Captain: Nathan Cayless	Penrith Panthers; 41st season Ground: CUA Stadium; Coach: Matthew Elliott; Captain: Tony Puletua
South Sydney Rabbitohs; 98th season Ground: Telstra Stadium; Coach: Jason Taylor; Captain: David Kidwell & Roy Asotasi	St. George Illawarra Dragons; 9th season Ground: OKI Jubilee Stadium & WIN Stadium; Coach: Nathan Brown; Captain: Mark Gasnier	Sydney Roosters; 100th season Ground: Sydney Football Stadium; Coach: Chris Anderson → Brad Fittler; Captain: Craig Fitzgibbon	Wests Tigers; 8th season Ground: Campbelltown Stadium & Leichhardt Oval; Coach: Tim Sheens; Captain: Brett Hodgson

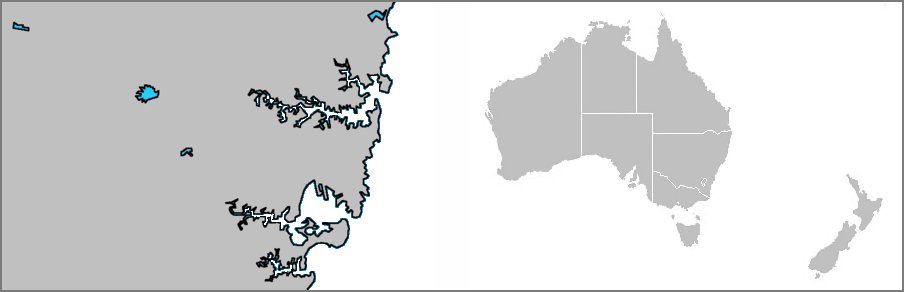
Locations of the participating clubs

== Ladder ==
2007 NRL season
Pos	Team	Pld	W	D	L	B	PF	PA	PD	Pts
1	Melbourne Storm	24	21	0	3	1	627	277	+350	44
2	Manly-Warringah Sea Eagles	24	18	0	6	1	597	377	+220	38
3	North Queensland Cowboys	24	15	0	9	1	547	618	−71	32
4	New Zealand Warriors	24	13	1	10	1	593	434	+159	29
5	Parramatta Eels	24	13	0	11	1	573	481	+92	28
6	Canterbury-Bankstown Bulldogs	24	12	0	12	1	575	528	+47	26
7	South Sydney Rabbitohs	24	12	0	12	1	408	399	+9	26
8	Brisbane Broncos	24	11	0	13	1	511	476	+35	24
9	Wests Tigers	24	11	0	13	1	541	561	−20	24
10	Sydney Roosters	24	10	1	13	1	445	610	−165	23
11	Cronulla-Sutherland Sharks	24	10	0	14	1	463	403	+60	22
12	Gold Coast Titans	24	10	0	14	1	409	559	−150	22
13	St George Illawarra Dragons	24	9	0	15	1	431	509	−78	20
14	Canberra Raiders	24	9	0	15	1	522	652	−130	20
15	Newcastle Knights	24	9	0	15	1	418	708	−290	20
16	Penrith Panthers	24	8	0	16	1	539	607	−68	18

=== Ladder progression ===
- Numbers highlighted in green indicate that the team finished the round inside the top 8.
- Numbers highlighted in blue indicates the team finished first on the ladder in that round.
- Numbers highlighted in red indicates the team finished in last place on the ladder in that round
- Underlined numbers indicate that the team had a bye during that round.

	Team	1	2	3	4	5	6	7	8	9	10	11	12	13	14	15	16	17	18	19	20	21	22	23	24	25
1	Melbourne	2	4	6	8	10	12	14	14	16	18	18	20	22	24	26	28	30	32	34	34	36	38	40	42	44
2	Manly-Warringah	2	4	6	8	10	12	12	14	16	18	20	20	22	24	24	24	26	28	30	32	34	36	36	36	38
3	North Queensland	2	4	6	8	8	8	10	12	12	12	14	16	16	16	18	20	22	22	22	22	24	26	28	30	32
4	New Zealand	2	4	4	4	6	8	10	10	10	10	10	10	10	12	14	16	16	18	20	22	23	25	25	27	29
5	Parramatta	0	0	2	4	6	6	6	8	8	10	12	14	14	16	18	20	20	22	24	24	26	26	26	26	28
6	Bulldogs	0	0	2	4	4	6	6	8	8	8	8	10	12	12	14	16	18	18	20	22	22	24	26	26	26
7	South Sydney	2	4	6	6	6	8	8	8	8	10	10	10	12	12	14	16	16	16	18	20	20	22	24	26	26
8	Brisbane	0	0	0	2	2	4	4	6	6	6	8	8	10	12	14	16	18	20	20	22	22	22	22	24	24
9	Wests	0	0	0	0	2	4	6	8	10	12	14	14	16	16	16	18	20	20	20	22	22	22	24	24	24
10	Sydney	0	0	0	0	0	2	4	4	6	6	8	8	10	12	12	12	12	14	16	18	19	21	21	21	23
11	Cronulla-Sutherland	2	2	2	4	4	6	6	8	10	12	12	12	14	14	14	16	16	16	16	16	16	18	18	20	22
12	Gold Coast	0	2	2	4	6	6	8	8	8	8	10	12	14	16	18	18	18	18	18	18	20	20	22	22	22
13	St George Illawarra	2	2	2	2	2	4	4	6	6	8	8	10	10	10	10	12	14	14	16	16	18	18	18	20	20
14	Canberra	0	0	2	2	4	4	6	6	8	10	12	12	14	14	14	14	14	16	16	18	18	18	20	20	20
15	Newcastle	2	4	4	4	6	6	8	8	10	12	12	14	14	16	16	16	18	18	18	18	18	18	18	18	20
16	Penrith	0	2	4	4	4	4	4	4	6	8	8	10	10	10	10	10	10	12	12	12	14	14	16	18	18

== Finals series ==
To decide the grand finalists from the top eight finishing teams, the NRL adopts the McIntyre final eight system. The finals series was contested over a period of four weeks, culminating with the NRL Grand Final being held on Sunday 30 September 2007. For the first time, the week 2 and week 3 final matches were played in the cities of previous week winners rather than Sydney only.

Home	Score	Away	Match Information
Home	Score	Away	Date and Time	Venue	Referee	Crowd
Qualifying Finals
New Zealand Warriors	10–12	Parramatta Eels	7 September 2007 8:30pm	Mt. Smart Stadium	Tony Archer	28,745
North Queensland Cowboys	20–18	Canterbury-Bankstown Bulldogs	8 September 2007 6:30pm	Dairy Farmers Stadium	Paul Simpkins	24,004
Manly Warringah Sea Eagles	30–6	South Sydney Rabbitohs	8 September 2007 8:30pm	Brookvale Oval	Shayne Hayne	19,875
Melbourne Storm	40–0	Brisbane Broncos	9 September 2007 4:00pm	Olympic Park Stadium	Steve Clark	15,522
Semi-finals
Parramatta Eels	25–6	Canterbury-Bankstown Bulldogs	15 September 2007 7:45pm	Telstra Stadium	Shayne Hayne	50,621
North Queensland Cowboys	49–12	New Zealand Warriors	16 September 2007 4:00pm	Dairy Farmers Stadium	Tony Archer	21,847
Preliminary Finals
Manly Warringah Sea Eagles	28–6	North Queensland Cowboys	22 September 2007 7:45pm	Sydney Football Stadium	Paul Simpkins	32,611
Melbourne Storm	26–10	Parramatta Eels	23 September 2007 4:00pm	Telstra Dome	Tony Archer	33,427

=== Finals Chart ===
Qualifying finals
1	Melbourne	40
8	Brisbane	0
4	New Zealand	10
5	Parramatta	12
3	North Queensland	20
6	Canterbury	18
2	Manly	30
7	South Sydney	6

Semifinals
4W	Parramatta	25
2L	Canterbury	6
3W	North Queensland	49
1L	New Zealand	12

Preliminary finals
1W	Melbourne	26
Parramatta	10
2W	Manly	28
North Queensland	6

Grand Final
Melbourne	34
Manly	8

=== Grand final ===
2007 NRL Grand Final

Sunday, 30 September
19:15 AEST (UTC+10)

Melbourne Storm	34 – 8	Manly Warringah Sea Eagles
Tries: 7 Quinn 12', 76'; Inglis 23', 55'; Crocker 44'; King 52'; Newton 72'; Goals: 3 C Smith 13', 74', 76' (3/8)	1st: 10–4; 2nd: 24–4; Report	Tries: 2 Matai 39'; Hicks 62'; Goals: Orford (0/2)

ANZStadium, Sydney
Attendance: 81,392
Referee: Tony Archer
Touch judges: Steve Chiddy, Russell Turner
Clive Churchill Medal: Greg Inglis (Melbourne)

== Player statistics ==
The following statistics are as of the conclusion of Round 25.

Top 5 point scorers

Points	Player	Tries	Goals	Field Goals
202	Hazem El Masri	10	81	0
176	Luke Covell	10	68	0
166	Cameron Smith	3	77	0
164	Johnathan Thurston	8	66	0
154	Luke Burt	9	59	0

Top 5 try scorers

Tries	Player
21	Matt Bowen
21	Israel Folau
17	Ashley Graham
16	Brett Stewart
16	Chris Lawrence
16	Matt King

Top 5 goal scorers

Goals	Player
81	Hazem El Masri
77	Cameron Smith
68	Luke Covell
66	Johnathan Thurston
59	Michael Witt
59	Luke Burt

== Dally M Awards ==
The Dally M Awards were introduced in 1980 by News Limited. The most prestigious of these awards is the Dally M Medal which is awarded to the Player Of The Year and many other awards. The other prestigious award is the Provans Summons Medal which is the season's best player as voted by the public. As well as honouring the player of the year the awards night also recognises the premier player in each position, the best coach, the best captain, representative player of the year and the most outstanding rookie of the season. The awards night and Player of the Year medal are named in honour of Australian former rugby league great Herbert Henry "Dally" Messenger. The top try-scorer and top point-scorer tallies are made at the end of the last round of the regular season and hence may be different from the overall top-scorers by the end of the finals.

Award	Player	Club
Dally M Medal	Johnathan Thurston	North Queensland Cowboys
Provan-Summons Medal	Nathan Hindmarsh	Parramatta Eels
Rookie of the Year	Israel Folau	Melbourne Storm
Captain of the Year	Steve Price	New Zealand Warriors
Rep Player of the Year	Cameron Smith	Melbourne Storm
Coach of the Year	Craig Bellamy	Melbourne Storm
Top Tryscorer of the Year	Israel Folau; Matt Bowen	Melbourne Storm; North Queensland Cowboys
Top Pointscorer of the Year	Hazem El Masri	Bulldogs

Team of the Year

Award	Player	Club
Best Fullback	Matthew Bowen	North Queensland Cowboys
Best Winger	Jarryd Hayne	Parramatta Eels
Best Centre	Justin Hodges	Brisbane Broncos
Best Five-Eighth	Darren Lockyer	Brisbane Broncos
Best Halfback	Johnathan Thurston	North Queensland Cowboys
Best Lock	Dallas Johnson	Melbourne Storm
Best Second-Rower	Anthony Watmough	Manly Warringah Sea Eagles
Best Prop	Steve Price	New Zealand Warriors
Best Hooker	Robbie Farah	Wests Tigers

== 2007 Transfers ==
=== Players ===
Player	2006 Club	2007 Club
Neville Costigan	Brisbane Broncos	Canberra Raiders
Casey McGuire	Brisbane Broncos	Super League: Catalans Dragons
Scott Minto	Brisbane Broncos	North Queensland Cowboys
Brett Seymour	Brisbane Broncos	Cronulla-Sutherland Sharks
Tame Tupou	Brisbane Broncos	Super League: Bradford Bulls
Shane Webcke	Brisbane Broncos	Retirement
Jason Croker	Canberra Raiders	Super League: Catalans Dragons
Craig Frawley	Canberra Raiders	Brisbane Broncos
Michael Hodgson	Canberra Raiders	Gold Coast Titans
Kris Kahler	Canberra Raiders	Gold Coast Titans
Andrew Lomu	Canberra Raiders	Brisbane Broncos
Terry Martin	Canberra Raiders	Celtic Crusaders
Adam Mogg	Canberra Raiders	Super League: Catalans Dragons
Clinton Schifcofske	Canberra Raiders	Queensland Reds (Super 14)
Jason Smith	Canberra Raiders	North Queensland Cowboys
Simon Woolford	Canberra Raiders	St. George Illawarra Dragons
Roy Asotasi	Canterbury-Bankstown Bulldogs	South Sydney Rabbitohs
Tony Grimaldi	Canterbury-Bankstown Bulldogs	Retirement
Daniel Irvine	Canterbury-Bankstown Bulldogs	South Sydney Rabbitohs
Nate Myles	Canterbury-Bankstown Bulldogs	Sydney Roosters
Darren Albert	Cronulla-Sutherland Sharks	Retirement
Phil Bailey	Cronulla-Sutherland Sharks	Super League: Wigan Warriors
Matt Hilder	Cronulla-Sutherland Sharks	Gold Coast Titans
Tevita Leo-Latu	Cronulla-Sutherland Sharks	Super League: Wakefield Trinity Wildcats
Hutch Maiava	Cronulla-Sutherland Sharks	Super League: Hull F.C.
Darren Mapp	Cronulla-Sutherland Sharks	Celtic Crusaders
Beau Scott	Cronulla-Sutherland Sharks	St. George Illawarra Dragons
James Stosic	Cronulla-Sutherland Sharks	Gold Coast Titans
Nigel Vagana	Cronulla-Sutherland Sharks	South Sydney Rabbitohs
Richard Villasanti	Cronulla-Sutherland Sharks	Retirement
Ben Kennedy	Manly Warringah Sea Eagles	Retirement
Kylie Leuluai	Manly Warringah Sea Eagles	Super League: Leeds Rhinos
Paul Stephenson	Manly Warringah Sea Eagles	Cronulla-Sutherland Sharks
Michael Witt	Manly Warringah Sea Eagles	New Zealand Warriors
Jamie Feeney	Melbourne Storm	Retirement
Nathan Friend	Melbourne Storm	Gold Coast Titans
Scott Hill	Melbourne Storm	Super League: Harlequins RL
David Kidwell	Melbourne Storm	South Sydney Rabbitohs
Glen Turner	Melbourne Storm	Canberra Raiders
Chris Walker	Melbourne Storm	Gold Coast Titans
Jake Webster	Melbourne Storm	Gold Coast Titans
Brian Carney	Newcastle Knights	Munster (Irish rugby union)
Dustin Cooper	Newcastle Knights	Cronulla-Sutherland Sharks
Matt Gidley	Newcastle Knights	Super League: St. Helens
Todd Lowrie	Newcastle Knights	Parramatta Eels
Anthony Quinn	Newcastle Knights	Melbourne Storm
Craig Smith	Newcastle Knights	Retirement
Sione Faumuina	New Zealand Warriors	North Queensland Cowboys
Awen Guttenbeil	New Zealand Warriors	Castleford Tigers (National League One)
Clinton Toopi	New Zealand Warriors	Super League: Leeds Rhinos
Brent Webb	New Zealand Warriors	Super League: Leeds Rhinos
Brett Firman	North Queensland Cowboys	Penrith Panthers
Josh Hannay	North Queensland Cowboys	Cronulla-Sutherland Sharks
Travis Norton	North Queensland Cowboys	Retirement
Mitchell Sargent	North Queensland Cowboys	Newcastle Knights
Matt Sing	North Queensland Cowboys	Super League: Hull F.C.
Wade McKinnon	Parramatta Eels	New Zealand Warriors
John Morris	Parramatta Eels	Wests Tigers
Glenn Morrison	Parramatta Eels	Super League: Bradford Bulls
Luke O'Dwyer	Parramatta Eels	Gold Coast Titans
Adam Peek	Parramatta Eels	St. George Illawarra Dragons
Henry Perenara	Parramatta Eels	Cronulla-Sutherland Sharks
Matt Petersen	Parramatta Eels	Gold Coast Titans
Paul Stringer	Parramatta Eels	Retirement
Michael Vella	Parramatta Eels	Super League: Hull Kingston Rovers
Dean Widders	Parramatta Eels	South Sydney Rabbitohs
Preston Campbell	Penrith Panthers	Gold Coast Titans
Danny Galea	Penrith Panthers	Wests Tigers
Lee Hookey	Penrith Panthers	Retirement
Craig Stapleton	Penrith Panthers	Cronulla-Sutherland Sharks
Luke Swain	Penrith Panthers	Gold Coast Titans
Adam MacDougall	South Sydney Rabbitohs	Newcastle Knights
Mark Minichiello	South Sydney Rabbitohs	Gold Coast Titans
Todd Polglase	South Sydney Rabbitohs	Newcastle Knights
Ben Walker	South Sydney Rabbitohs	Retirement
Shane Walker	South Sydney Rabbitohs	Retirement
Luke Bailey	St. George Illawarra Dragons	Gold Coast Titans
Trent Barrett	St. George Illawarra Dragons	Super League: Wigan Warriors
Colin Best	St. George Illawarra Dragons	Canberra Raiders
Matt Bickerstaff	St. George Illawarra Dragons	Canberra Raiders
Aaron Gorrell	St. George Illawarra Dragons	Super League: Catalans Dragons
Clint Greenshields	St. George Illawarra Dragons	Super League: Catalans Dragons
Michael Henderson	St. George Illawarra Dragons	Gold Coast Titans
Reece Simmonds	St. George Illawarra Dragons	South Sydney Rabbitohs
Shaun Timmins	St. George Illawarra Dragons	Retirement
Ryan Cross	Sydney Roosters	Western Force (Super 14)
John Doyle	Sydney Roosters	Retirement
Mark Edmondson	Sydney Roosters	Super League: Salford City Reds
Brett Finch	Sydney Roosters	Parramatta Eels
Chris Flannery	Sydney Roosters	Super League: St. Helens
Glenn Hall	Sydney Roosters	Manly Warringah Sea Eagles
Adrian Morley	Sydney Roosters	Super League: Warrington Wolves
Shane Elford	Wests Tigers	Super League: Huddersfield Giants
Sam Harris	Wests Tigers	New South Wales Waratahs (Super 14)
Anthony Laffranchi	Wests Tigers	Gold Coast Titans
Jamahl Lolesi	Wests Tigers	Super League: Huddersfield Giants
Scott Prince	Wests Tigers	Gold Coast Titans
John Skandalis	Wests Tigers	Super League: Huddersfield Giants
Brad Meyers	Super League: Bradford Bulls	Gold Coast Titans
Richie Faʻaoso	Super League: Castleford Tigers	Parramatta Eels
Danny Nutley	Super League: Castleford Tigers	Sydney Roosters
Chris Beattie	Super League: Catalans Dragons	Sydney Roosters
Ian Hindmarsh	Super League: Catalans Dragons	Parramatta Eels
Nick Bradley-Qalilawa	Super League: Harlequins RL	Manly Warringah Sea Eagles
Richard Mathers	Super League: Leeds Rhinos	Gold Coast Titans
Andrew Dunemann	Super League: Salford City Reds	Canberra Raiders
Jamie Lyon	Super League: St. Helens	Manly Warringah Sea Eagles
Logan Swann	Super League: Warrington Wolves	New Zealand Warriors
Michael Dobson	Super League: Wigan Warriors	Canberra Raiders
Scott Logan	Super League: Wigan Warriors	Canberra Raiders
David Myles	Toulouse Olympique	Gold Coast Titans
Matt Rua	Central Comets (Queensland Cup)	Melbourne Storm
Mat Rogers	New South Wales Waratahs (Super 14)	Gold Coast Titans
Jason Moodie	N/A	Wests Tigers

=== Coaches ===
Coach	2006 Club	2007 Club
Matthew Elliott	Canberra Raiders	Penrith Panthers
Michael Hagan	Newcastle Knights	Parramatta Eels
Ricky Stuart	Sydney Roosters	Cronulla-Sutherland Sharks

== See also ==
- National Rugby League
- 2007 Rugby League State of Origin series
- 2007 Australian football code crowds
