= Adam Christensen =

Adam Christensen may refer to:

- Adam Christensen (rugby league) (born 2002), Australian rugby league footballer
- Adam Christensen, candidate in the 2020 United States House of Representatives elections in Florida
