= Matthew Cross (rugby league) =

Australian rugby league footballer (born 1981)

Matt Cross
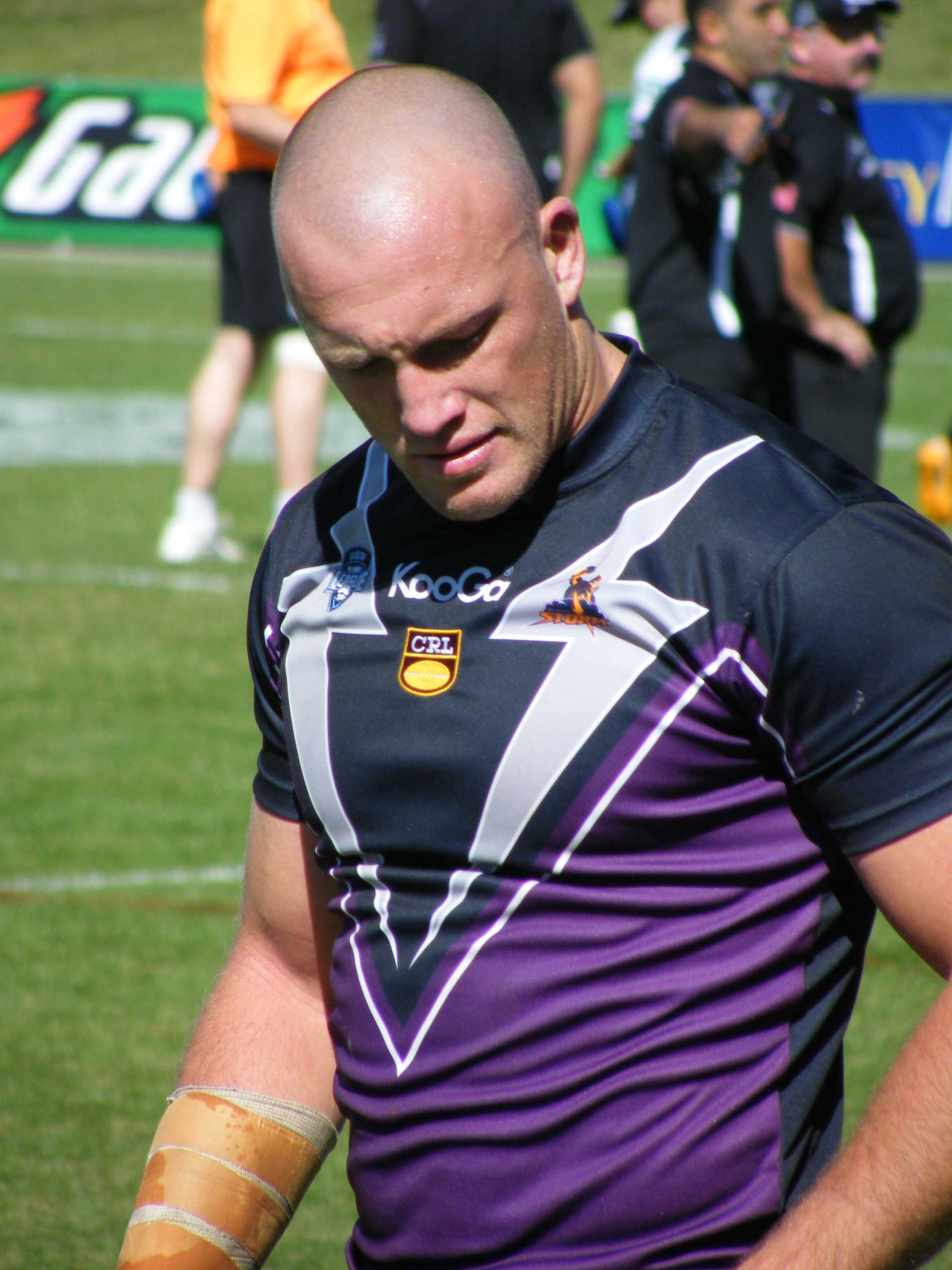

Personal information
- Full name: Matthew Cross
- Born: 28 April 1981 (age 45) Wagga Wagga, New South Wales, Australia
- Height: 193 cm (6 ft 4 in)
- Weight: 110 kg (17 st 5 lb)

Playing information
- Position: Prop, Second-row
Club
Years	Team	Pld	T	G	FG	P
2005–07	Penrith Panthers	33	6	0	0	24
2008	Gold Coast Titans	3	0	0	0	0
2009	Melbourne Storm	14	3	0	0	12
2010	Manly Sea Eagles	16	3	0	0	12
	Total	66	12	0	0	48
- Source: As of 16 January 2019
- Relatives: Ben Cross (brother)

Matt Cross (born 28 April 1981) is an Australian former professional rugby league footballer who last played for the Manly-Warringah Sea Eagles in the National Rugby League. Cross previously played for the Penrith Panthers and the Gold Coast. Cross played as a prop or in the second-row. Cross is the brother of Ben Cross.

== Playing career ==
Cross made his first grade debut for Penrith in round 20 of the 2005 NRL season against North Queensland at the Willows Sports Complex. In his first two seasons with Penrith the club missed the finals. In the 2007 NRL season, Cross played 9 games as the club finished last on the table.

In 2008, Cross joined the Gold Coast but only played three games for the club. Cross spent the 2009 NRL season with the Melbourne Storm after the Titans agreed to an early release.

Cross then joined the Manly-Warringah Sea Eagles in 2010 where he played 16 games and scored 3 tries for his new club. At the end of 2010, Cross was released by Manly and this would prove to be his last season in first grade.
