= Aaron Cannings =

New Zealand rugby league footballer

Personal information
- Full name: Aaron Cannings
- Born: 26 October 1981 (age 43); Auckland, New Zealand
- Height: 189 cm (6 ft 2 in)
- Weight: 127 kg (20 st 0 lb)

Playing information
- Position: Prop
Club
Years	Team	Pld	T	G	FG	P
2002	Northern Eagles	7	0	0	0	0
2003	Manly-Warringah	22	3	0	0	12
2004–07	Parramatta Eels	38	2	0	0	8
2008–10	Gold Coast Titans	30	3	0	0	12
	Total	97	8	0	0	32

Aaron Cannings (born 26 October 1981) is a New Zealand former professional rugby league footballer who played in the 2000s and 2010s, as a prop. He played for the Northern Eagles, Manly-Warringah Sea Eagles, Parramatta Eels and the Gold Coast Titans in the National Rugby League, and for the Tweed Heads Seagulls in the 2011 Queensland Cup.

== Playing career ==
Cannings made his first grade debut for the Northern Eagles in round 16 of the 2002 NRL season against Melbourne. At the end of 2002, the Northern Eagles were dissolved and reverted to Manly-Warringah. Cannings played one season with Manly before joining Parramatta.

In 2005, Cannings made 13 appearances as Parramatta won the Minor Premiership but he did not feature in the finals series for the club. Cannings missed the entire 2006 season but returned in 2007 playing 21 games for Parramatta as they finished 5th on the table. In 2008, Cannings joined Gold Coast and spent three years at the club before being released at the end of 2010.

== Personal life ==
Cannings was born in Auckland, New Zealand with Australian and Cook Island and Tongan heritage. He lived in country towns Cobar and Wee Waa before moving to Sydney to start his career in Rugby league. Cannings currently works in the financial industry.
