= Josh Lewis (rugby league) =

Australian rugby league footballer

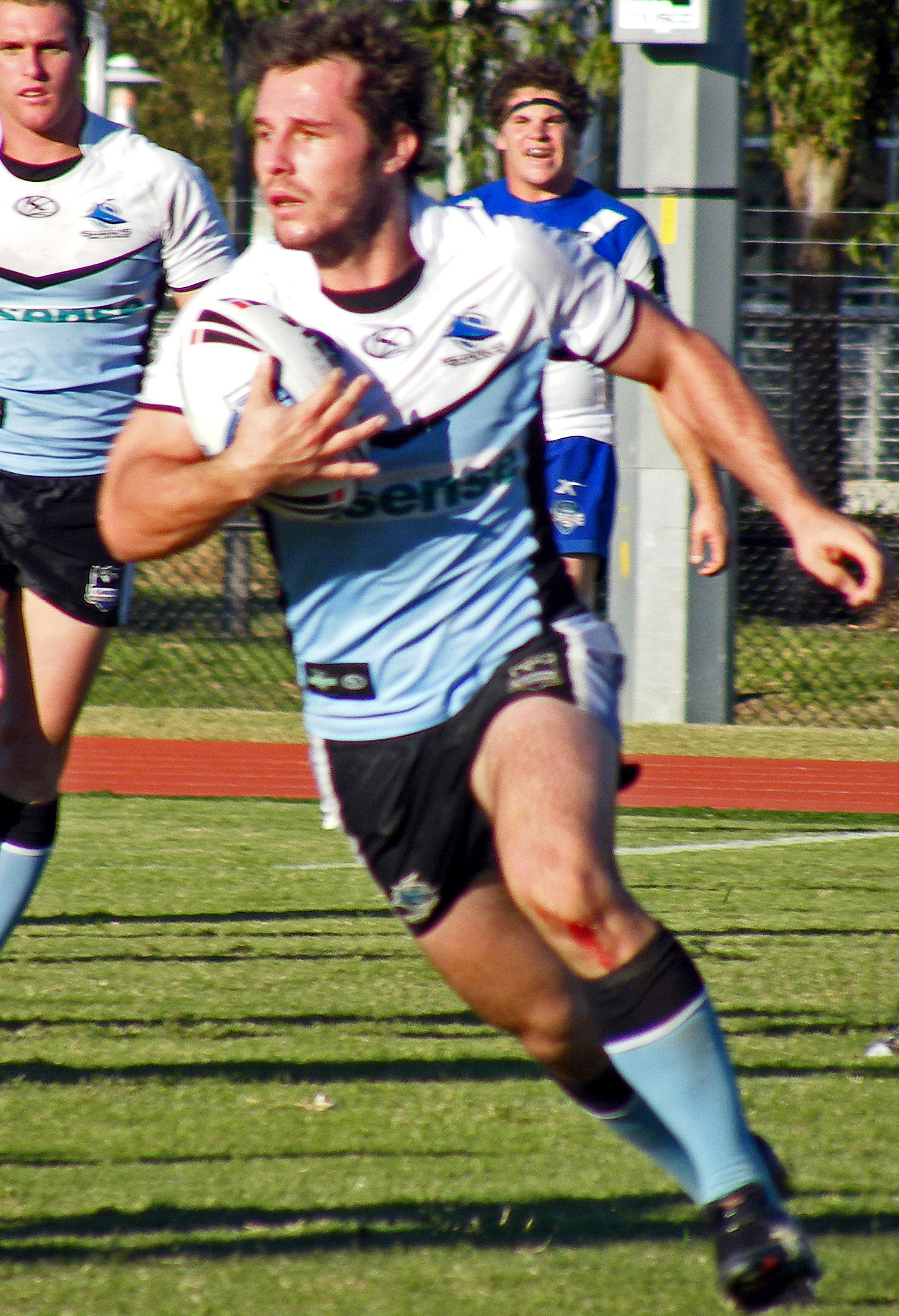

Personal information
- Full name: Josh Lewis
- Born: 5 October 1985 (age 40) Sydney, New South Wales, Australia
- Height: 180 cm (5 ft 11 in)
- Weight: 86 kg (13 st 8 lb)

Playing information
- Position: Five-eighth, Halfback
Club
Years	Team	Pld	T	G	FG	P
2006–07	Sydney Roosters	12	4	4	0	24
2007–08	Gold Coast Titans	13	4	0	1	17
2011–17	Toulouse Olympique	91	11	0	0	0
	Total	116	19	4	1	41
Representative
Years	Team	Pld	T	G	FG	P
2008	Queensland Residents	1	0	0	0	0
- Source: As of 5 January 2024

Josh Lewis (born 5 October 1985 in Sydney, New South Wales is an Australian rugby league footballer who most recently played for Toulouse Olympique. Lewis previously played for the Gold Coast Titans and Sydney Roosters in the National Rugby League competition.

== Playing career ==
A Leichhardt junior and lower grader with the St George and Sydney Roosters clubs, Lewis made his first-grade debut playing for the Roosters in 2006. Looking to gain a regular starting position, Lewis was granted a release from his contract and joined the Gold Coast Titans midway through the 2007 season. In his debut match for the Gold Coast against South Sydney Rabbitohs he set up two tries and kicked a field goal.

Lewis played for the Balmain Tigers in 2009, and was unable to get a run in the Wests Tigers team. Lewis was signed by the Cronulla Sharks for the 2010 season, linking with former coach Ricky Stuart.

Lewis signed with Toulouse in Co-operative Championship in France for 2011.

In 2018, Lewis joined Ron Massey Cup side the Guildford Owls.

In 2021, Lewis signed for Ron Massey Cup side, the Hills District Bulls.

== Sources ==
- Whiticker, Alan & Hudson, Glen (2006) The Encyclopedia of Rugby League Players, Gavin Allen Publishing, Sydney
