= Ben Jeffery =

Australian rugby league footballer and coach

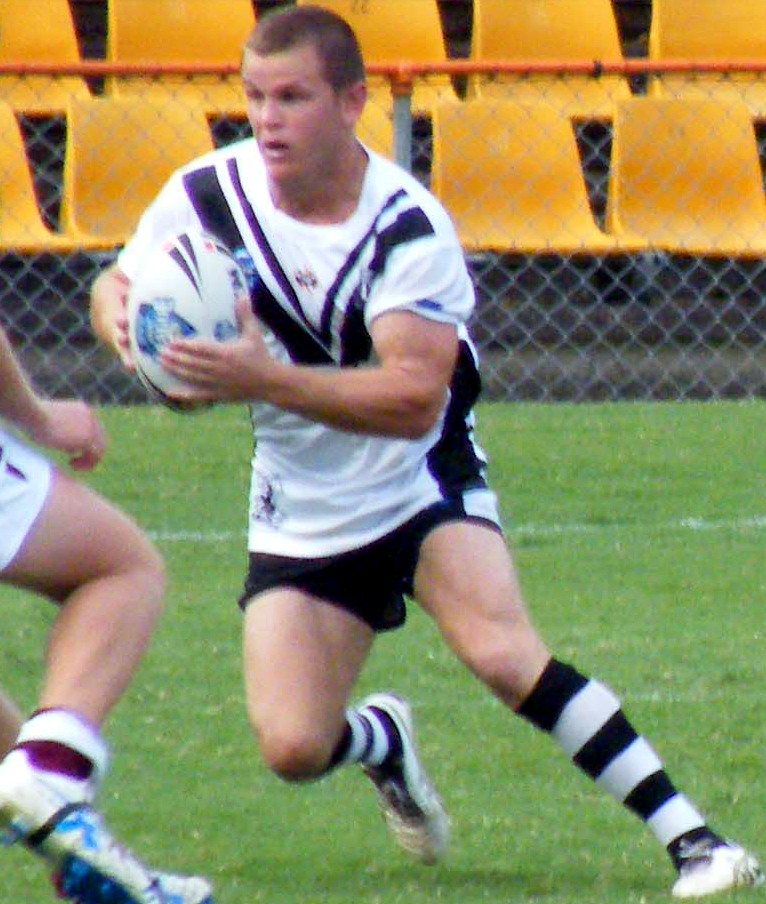

Personal information
- Born: 1 March 1987 (age 38); Griffith, New South Wales, Australia
- Height: 177 cm (5 ft 10 in)
- Weight: 87 kg (13 st 10 lb)

Playing information
- Position: Fullback, Wing, Centre
Club
Years	Team	Pld	T	G	FG	P
2006	Wests Tigers	3	1	0	0	4
2008	Gold Coast Titans	19	6	0	0	24
	Total	22	7	0	0	28
Representative
Years	Team	Pld	T	G	FG	P
2009	Queensland Residents	1	1	0	0	4
- Source: As of 5 January 2024

Ben Jeffery (born 1 March 1987) is an Australian former professional rugby league footballer. He primarily played on the Wing. He previously played for the Wests Tigers and Gold Coast Titans in the NRL.

== Playing career ==
Jeffery made his first grade debut for reigning premiers the Wests Tigers against the Brisbane Broncos in round 21 of the 2006 NRL season at Suncorp Stadium scoring a try in a 20–6 victory. Jeffery made two further appearances for Wests as the club failed to qualify for the finals finishing 11th.

In the 2008 NRL season, he joined the Gold Coast. Jeffery made 19 appearances for the club as they finished 13th on the table. He then returned to his hometown Griffith and played for his junior club Waratah Tigers for two years in which he won the 2010 Group 20 Premiership with the club.

In 2012, he joined Group 9 club Albury Thunder where he won a premierships with the club that year, and in 2013 and 2014. In 2017, he moved to Wagga Wagga, and took up the role of Captain/Coach of the Group 9 club, the Wagga Wagga Kangaroos.
