= Esikeli Tonga =

Tonga international rugby league footballer

Esi Tonga
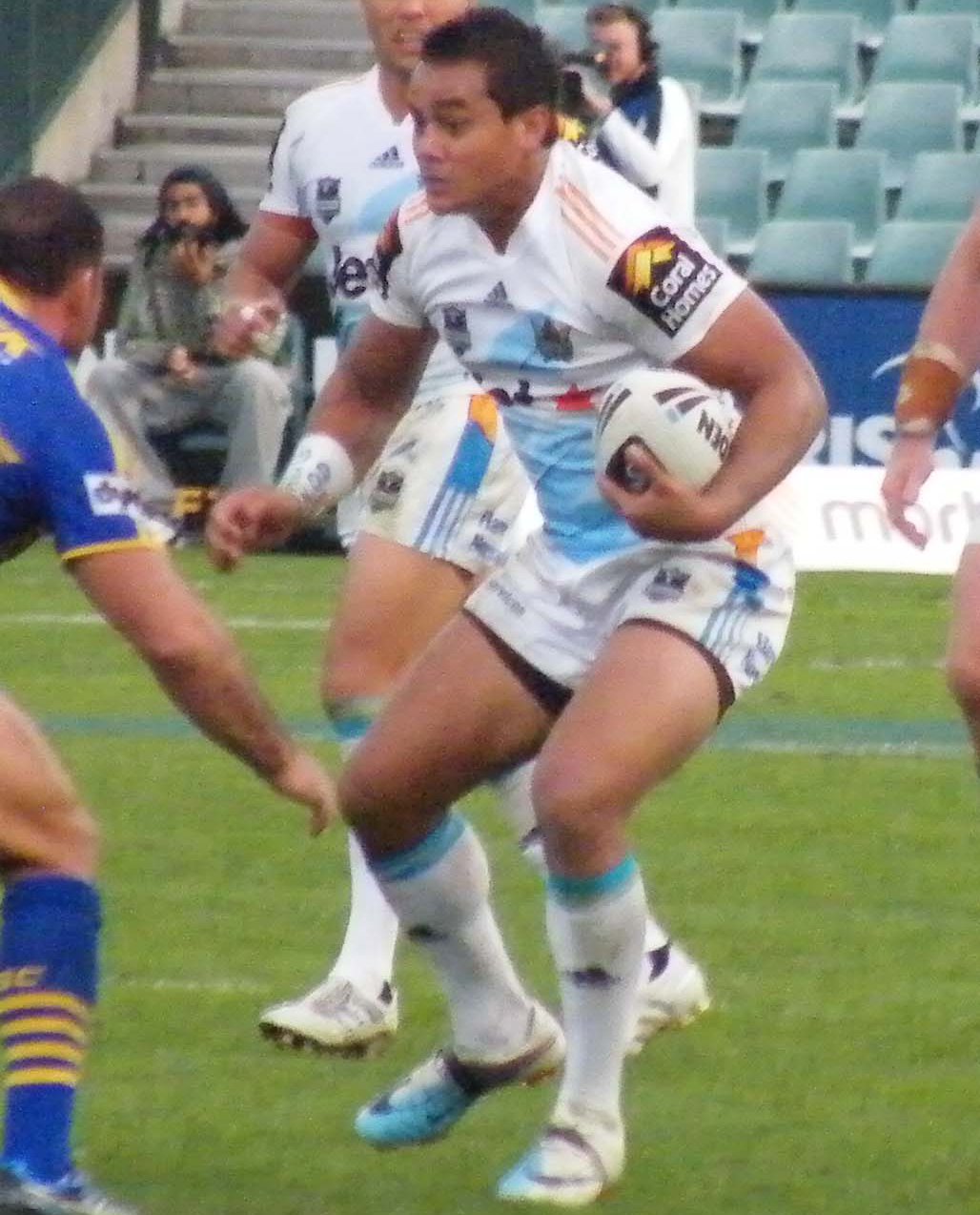

Personal information
- Full name: Esikeli Tonga
- Born: 5 February 1988 (age 38) Dubbo, New South Wales, Australia

Playing information
- Height: 1.87 m (6 ft 2 in)
- Weight: 94 kg (14 st 11 lb)
- Position: Centre, Wing, Second-row
Club
Years	Team	Pld	T	G	FG	P
2008–11	Gold Coast Titans	36	10	0	0	40
2012	Parramatta Eels	3	0	0	0	0
2013	Manly Sea Eagles	1	0	0	0	0
	Total	40	10	0	0	40
Representative
Years	Team	Pld	T	G	FG	P
2008	Tonga	3	1	0	0	4
- Relatives: Willie Tonga (brother)

Esikeli Tonga (born 5 February 1988) is a former Tonga international rugby league footballer who last previously played for the Manly-Warringah Sea Eagles in the National Rugby League. A Tongan international representative three-quarter or second-rower, he is the younger brother of Parramatta Eels centre Willie Tonga.

== Background ==
Tonga was born in Dubbo, New South Wales, Australia. He is of both Australian Aboriginal and Tongan descent.

In 2005 Tonga graduated from Marsden State High School in Logan City.

== Playing career ==
Tonga made his first grade debut for the Gold Coast against Cronulla-Sutherland in round 12 of the 2008 NRL season at Shark Park. In August 2008, Tonga was named in the Tonga training squad for the 2008 Rugby League World Cup, and in October 2008 he was named in the final 24-man Tonga squad.

In the 2009 NRL season, Tonga played 16 games as the Gold Coast reached the finals for the first time but Tonga missed out through injury. Tonga missed the entire 2010 NRL season but returned in 2011. Tonga played 12 games for the Gold Coast in 2011 as the club finished last and claimed the wooden spoon.

In the 2012 NRL season, Tonga joined Parramatta. Tonga only managed to make three appearances for the club as they finished last on the table for the first time since 1972 and claimed the wooden spoon.

In 2013, Tonga joined Manly-Warringah but only made one appearance for the club before being released.
