= Billy Ngawini =

New Zealand rugby league and rugby union footballer

Personal information
- Full name: Billy Ngawini
- Born: 24 August 1981 (age 45) Auckland, New Zealand
- Height: 172 cm (5 ft 8 in)
- Weight: 88 kg (13 st 12 lb)

Playing information

Rugby league
- Position: Hooker, Halfback
Club
| Years | Team | Pld | T | G | FG | P |
|---|---|---|---|---|---|---|
| 2006 | Canterbury Bulldogs | 3 | 0 | 0 | 0 | 0 |
| 2008 | Gold Coast Titans | 1 | 0 | 0 | 0 | 0 |
| | Total | 4 | 0 | 0 | 0 | 0 |

Rugby union
Club
| Years | Team | Pld | T | G | FG | P |
|---|---|---|---|---|---|---|
| 2009 | Gold Coast Breakers | 9 | 3 | 0 | 0 | 15 |
| 2009–10 | Nice Côte d'Azur Université-Racing |
| 2009–10 | Leinster | 2 | 1 | 0 | 0 | 5 |
| 2010–13 | Rugby Club I Cavalieri Prato | 66 | 23 | 3 | 1 | 124 |
| 2013–- | Rugby Rovigo Delta |
| | Total | 77 | 27 | 3 | 1 | 144 |
- Source: As of 18:21, 7 September 2008 (UTC)

Billy Ngawini (born 24 August 1981) is an Italian international rugby union footballer who plays for Rugby Rovigo Delta in the Top12 and Amlin Challenge Cup in Europe.

He has previously played in the National Provincial Championship and rugby league in the National Rugby League for the Canterbury-Bankstown Bulldogs and the Gold Coast Titans. He is well known in the rugby world for his stepping ability.

== Background ==
Ngawini was born in Auckland, New Zealand. He is now a naturalised Italian.

== Early career ==
Ngawini began his career in rugby union, having been contracted to the Waikato Chiefs Super 12 franchise for four years beginning 2001. In 2001 he was also selected in the All Black 7s training squad with the likes of Joe Rokocoko and Eric Rush.

Ngawini switched to rugby league in 2004, attracting national media attention in a standout performance for the NZ A side that beat the Kangaroo XIII in a 2005 Test.

Ngawini featured in Ngati NRL documentary on Māori Television which follows a number of Maori boys trying to crack the Australian NRL competition.

== Bulldogs career ==
Debut: Vs Parramatta – 14 May 2006 Dog Years: (2) 2006, 2007

Ngawini joined the Canterbury-Bankstown Bulldogs in 2006 as a halfback, but was developed into playing at hooker.

He received the opportunity to play in the NRL in Round 10 against arch-rivals Parramatta. He went on to play a further two games in the top grade against the Cronulla-Sutherland Sharks the following week and then in Round 14 against the Canberra Raiders.

== Gold Coast Titans ==
Ngawini moved from the Canterbury club to the Gold Coast Titans for the 2008 NRL season.

Debut: vs Wests Tigers, 7 September 2008

== Gold Coast Breakers ==
Ngawini left the Gold Coast Titans at the end of the 2008 NRL season to move back to rugby union, and began the transition by joining the Gold Coast Breakers squad in the Queensland Premier Rugby.

Debut: Vs Souths – 4 April 2009

He made a start to the 2009 season for the Breakers, playing at fullback and first-five. His footwork, fast pace, accurate passing and deft offloads assisted in many scoring plays. He also helped the Breakers climb to second in the competition table after eleven rounds.

Despite only playing the first half of the season (due to his move to Leinster), Ngawini had the third highest number of votes in the Alec Evans Medal for the best and fairest player in the Queensland Premier Rugby.

During his time playing rugby union on the Gold Coast, he was also selected to play for the Queensland Reds 2nd XV.

== Leinster Rugby ==
He played with Leinster Rugby at the beginning of the 2009–10 Magners League. He was selected for the Leinster squad for the pre-season match vs Rugby Nice Côte d'Azur Université-Racing, scoring an impressive try in the 66th minute on debut for Leinster. He also played for Leinster versus London Irish.

Visa issues prevented his continuation with Leinster.

== Nice Rugby ==
Ngawini signed with Rugby Nice Côte d'Azur Université-Racing (RNCA) in 2009.

== Italian Super 10 ==
After three highly successful years with Rugby Club I Cavalieri Prato including a well publicised performance against Stade Francais in the Amlin Challenge Cup, Ngawini moved to Rugby Rovigo Delta as part of an extensive recruitment drive by the club.

He quickly became a crowd favourite at Rugby Rovigo Delta, scoring 15 tries in his first season alone, winning the accolade of most tries scored in Italy in the 2013/14 season.

== Wicklow RFC ==
For the 2017/2018 season he joined Irish Junior rugby team Wicklow Town RFC, playing in Leinster Division 1A, deploying his step alongside such greats as Dean H Leonard and Tommy O Donovan. Playing at scrum half and winger Billy scored many tries and received many many yellow cards.
