= Luke Bailey (rugby league) =

Australia international rugby league footballer

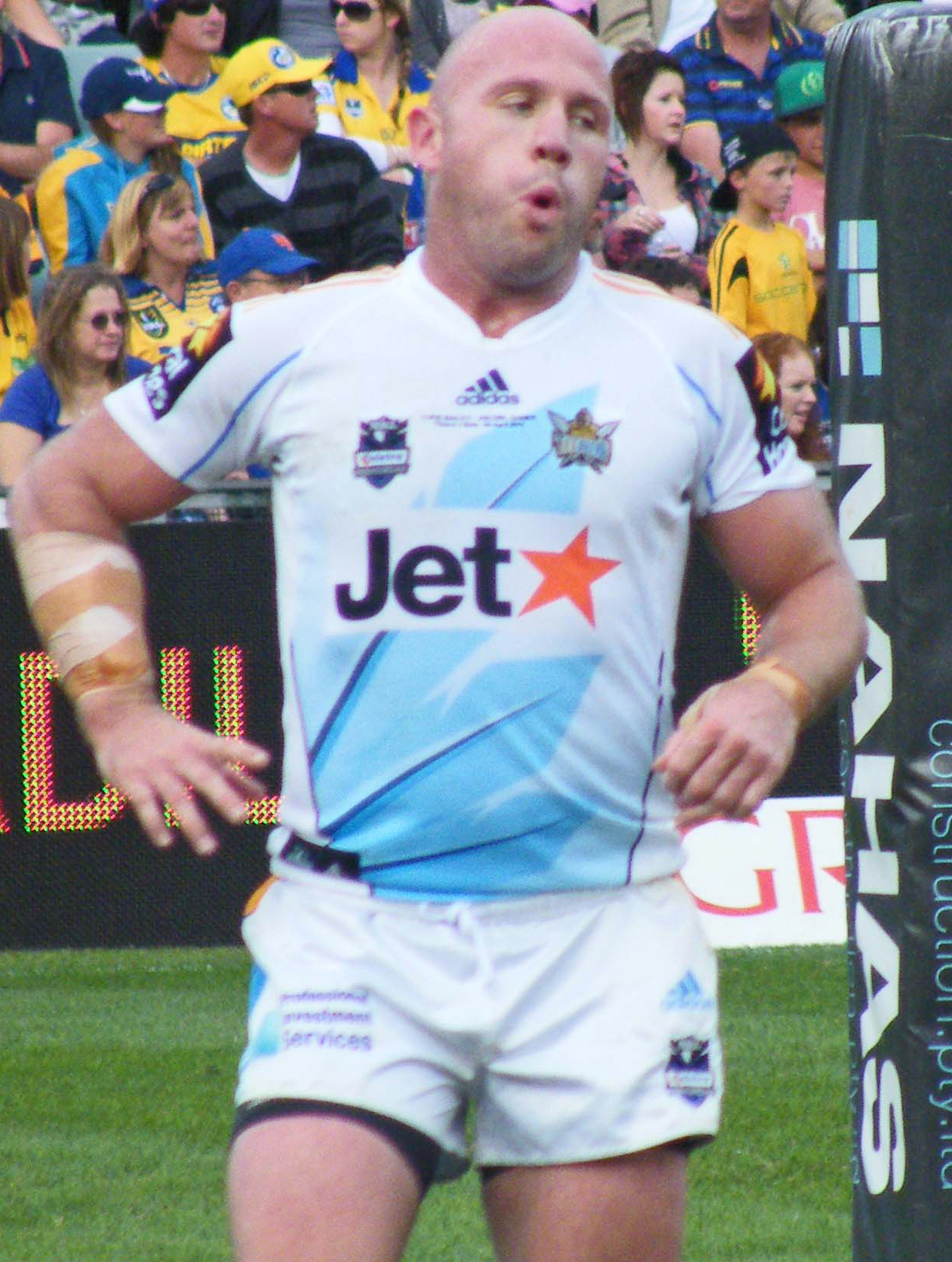

Personal information
- Born: 5 January 1980 (age 46) Port Kembla, New South Wales, Australia

Playing information
- Height: 189 cm (6 ft 2 in)
- Weight: 107 kg (16 st 12 lb)
- Position: Prop
Club
Years	Team	Pld	T	G	FG	P
2000–06	St George Illawarra	119	7	0	0	28
2007–14	Gold Coast Titans	150	13	0	0	52
	Total	269	20	0	0	80
Representative
Years	Team	Pld	T	G	FG	P
2002–05	Country NSW	2	0	0	0	0
2002–09	New South Wales	15	0	0	0	0
2003–09	Australia	4	0	0	0	0
2010–12	NRL All Stars	2	1	0	0	4

Luke Bailey (born 5 January 1980) is an Australian former professional rugby league footballer who played in the 2000s and 2010s. An Australia national and New South Wales State of Origin representative front row forward, he played his club football in the National Rugby League for the St. George Illawarra Dragons before signing with the Gold Coast Titans for their debut season in the NRL in 2007.

Bailey was originally a junior of the Shellharbour Sharks club before signing for the Illawarra Steelers as a teenager prior to their joint venture with the St. George Dragons in 1999. After debuting in 2000 he went on to make a further one hundred and nineteen appearances for St. George Illawarra before becoming newly formed National Rugby League franchise Gold Coast Titans' second signing for their inaugural 2007 season. Bailey and Scott Prince were named as co-captains. Bailey was the first person to score a try on Skilled Park at the Gold Coast.

== Background ==
Bailey was born on 5 January 1980 in Port Kembla, New South Wales. Initially a junior soccer player, he started to play rugby league at a junior level for the Shellharbour Sharks at the age of twelve. His talent was quickly noticed and while still an adolescent was signed to a junior development deal with Australian Rugby League club the Illawarra Steelers. While attending Warilla High School, Bailey played for the Australian Schoolboys team in 1997. At the completion of the 1998 season the Illawarra club was forced to form a joint venture with the St. George Dragons and Bailey's contract was renewed with the newly formed entity, the St. George Illawarra Dragons.

== Professional playing career ==
=== St George Illawarra Dragons ===
After playing a sole season of lower grade rugby league with St. George Illawarra, Bailey had impressed the club's top tier coaches enough to earn a spot on the bench for the Dragons' 2000 NRL season opener against local rivals the Cronulla-Sutherland Sharks; a game they would eventually lose twenty-eight to twelve. The 20-year-old made another two consecutive appearances from the bench but after a 0–24 defeat by the Canterbury-Bankstown Bulldogs he was dropped for their round four clash with the Northern Eagles.

Bailey remained in the lower grades at St. George Illawarra before earning a recall to the first grade side against the Wests Tigers in round six and a week later was given his first starting berth by coach David Waite. After an impressive performance during the team's win against the Auckland Warriors during his first start Bailey remained a staple fixture in the starting line-up, playing in every remaining season fixture and cementing his starting position in the club's line-up.

After an impressive first year, Bailey began the 2001 NRL season in a starting spot in the front row. He appeared in the Dragon's first four appearances of the season but tore a pectoral muscle during the team's loss to the Warriors, an injury which ruled him out for the rest of the season.

The beginning of the 2002 season saw Bailey recover fully from the injury that had prematurely ended his previous playing year and while he missed all of the club's trials including the Charity Shield fixture against South Sydney he made his return to the team for their opening round clash against Cronulla-Sutherland and would go on to appear in a further twenty consecutive appearances putting in several man of the match performances and along the way earning himself a call up to the New South Wales State of Origin side. Bailey made his State of Origin debut for the New South Wales Blues in game I of the 2002 series. He featured in the run-on side in all three games of that drawn series. During the Dragons round twenty-one loss to the Newcastle Knights Bailey found himself being severely reprimanded for the first time in his short career after opposing forward Josh Perry had claimed Bailey had bitten him on the forearm before withdrawing the allegation moments later. The seriousness of the allegation and the media frenzy that followed however saw Bailey being called up to face the NRL Judiciary however he was later cleared of any wrongdoing.

Five weeks later when St. George Illawarra again took on the Newcastle side the spotlight was again on Bailey for a disciplinary issue with Newcastle coach Michael Hagan claiming that a tackle from him had injured Newcastle captain Andrew Johns and ended his season, however he was not charged over the incident.

2003 started well for the St. George club with six victories from their first eight games. Bailey would receive his first call up for the Australian national side during the 2003 season where after some impressive performances he would play his first game during the 2003 Anzac test against the New Zealand national side. However Bailey injured his back during a fixture against the Penrith Panthers and was left with a severe lower back strain after being cleared of a suspected fractured vertebra. This injury became a somewhat re-occurring one and hampered his season keeping him out of several matches throughout the year. In 2003 he again made three appearances for the Blues – all as an impact player coming off the interchange bench. He was Man of the Match in game I of the 2003 State of Origin series. Further injury at the completion of the year ruled Bailey out of the Australian national side for their end of season Northern Hemisphere tour after he required surgery to fix a damaged ear.

After missing the Australian tour and having his first full off-season of training under his belt since 2002 meant that Bailey would play in St. George's trial matches that year including their 34 – 8 victory in Charity Shield against South Sydney. However the actual season did not start as positively with Bailey being placed on report for a dangerous tackle in the season opener against the Canberra Raiders and then subsequently being charged and forced to miss the round two clash with the Warriors. Bailey returned from suspension a week later in the Dragons loss to the Melbourne Storm and then went on to play the next few rounds for the Dragons with several strong performances earning him an Australian call up. Bailey earned his second international cap when he was selected to play for Australia from the interchange benh in the 2004 ANZAC Test match against the Kiwis but not make another appearance for a few years. Though injury again hampered him during a regular season fixture against the Manly club in round nine where Bailey re-injured his pectoral muscle as he had also done in 2001 which meant he was in for another lengthy stay on the sidelines being ruled out for the entire regular season. A torn pectoral muscle in 2004 saw his season disrupted and he took no part in Origin that year. He eventually made his return during the final series but not even his presence could help St. George Illawarra from narrowly losing to the Penrith Panthers.

2005 looked a promising one for both the club and Bailey, who started the season without any injury or suspension clouds hanging over his head. A promising start to the season would continue for the club helped by lack of injuries to key players including 'Bull' Bailey who would go on to make a total of twenty-three appearances for the club guiding them to equal top position of the ladder after all regular season games sitting just behind Parramatta on points difference. On 23 June 2005; it was announced that the newly formed Gold Coast Titans club was chasing the signature of Bailey for its inaugural 2007 season. It was confirmed later that month that he had signed a three-year deal with the club beginning with the first Titans season and finishing in 2009. Bailey appeared in all three games of the 2005 State of Origin series. The 2005 finals series saw Bailey put in an impressive performance in a tough game against Cronulla but all would be in vain as the St. George club would eventually lose in the preliminary finals to eventual winners the Wests Tigers.

Bailey played for the Blues in games II and III in 2006 State of Origin series. Bailey played his last season for St George Illawarra in 2006.

=== Gold Coast Titans ===
After joining the Gold Coast club Bailey was heralded as the rock on which the Titans forwards relied to start their debut season as possibly best they could and while the club would end up losing its first match by two points to his previous club the St. George Illawarra Dragons they would start the season with a 3 and 2 win–loss record.

Bailey was selected to play for the Australian national team from the interchange bench in the 2007 ANZAC Test match victory against New Zealand.

Bailey played for the Blues in all three games of the 2007 State of Origin series off the interchange bench. By the end of the Origin series of 2007 he had made fourteen appearances, eight off the bench. At the end of the Titans' first season he was named co-winner of the club's inaugural Paul Broughton Medal for best and fairest player of the season with teammate Anthony Laffranchi. He scored the first try for the Titans at Skilled Park in the 2008 Opener. He was selected for Australia in the one-off test match against New Zealand on 8 May 2009.

In May 2009, Bailey was named in the 17-man squad to represent New South Wales in the opening State of Origin match on 3 June 2009, in Melbourne. In the 2009 NRL season, Bailey played in the Gold Coast's first finals campaign.

After playing in the Titans' last few matches of the 2010 NRL season with a broken thumb, Bailey was awarded the Paul Broughton Medal for the club's player of the year again. Bailey played for the Gold Coast in their 2010 preliminary final defeat against the Sydney Roosters at Suncorp Stadium which ended the Gold Coast's best season since entering the competition.

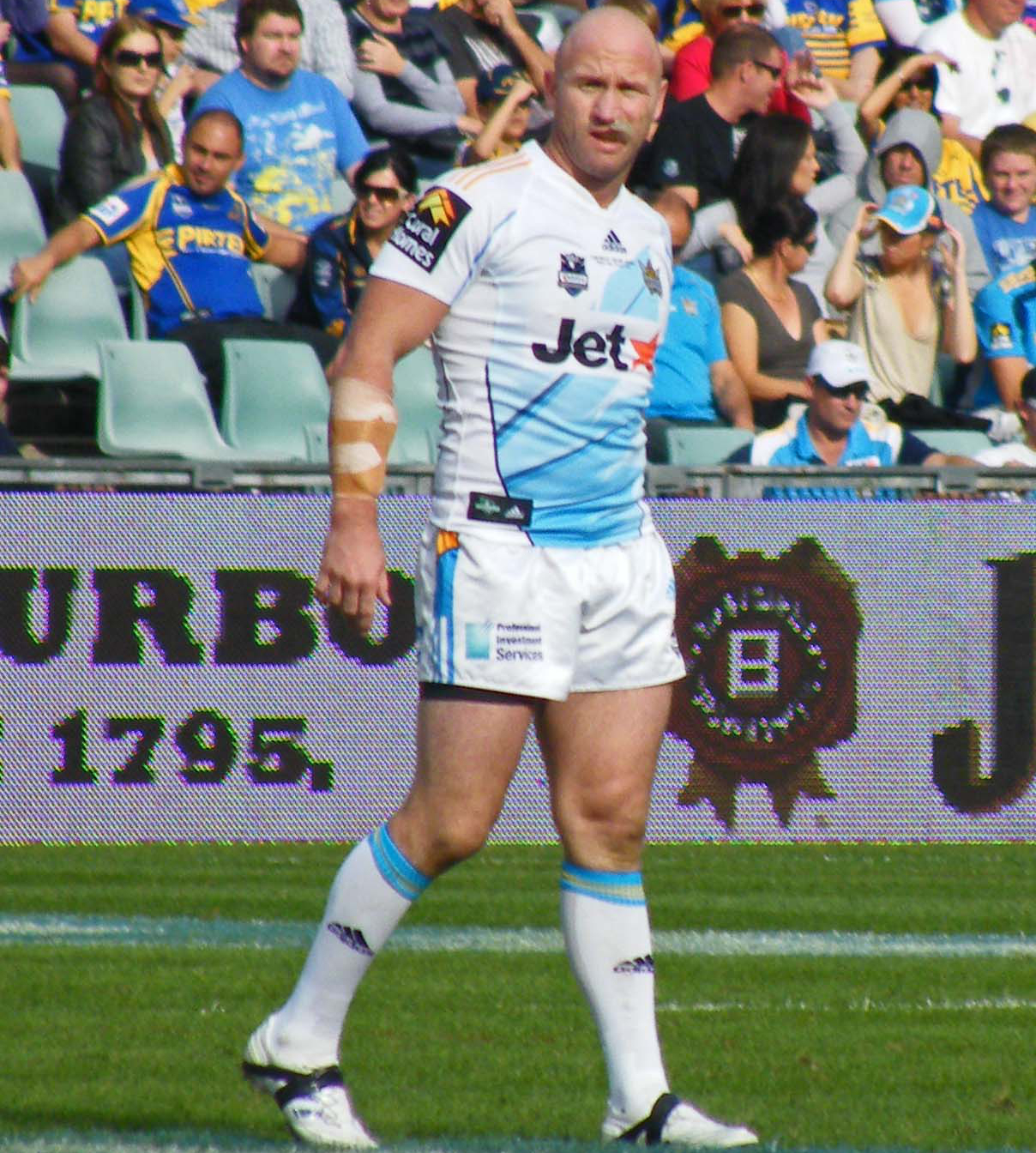
Bailey playing for the Titans in 2011

In the 2011 NRL season, Bailey made 21 appearances as the Gold Coast finished last on the table and claimed the wooden spoon.

On 1 September 2014 Bailey announced his retirement from Rugby League. He was one of two of the Titans' foundation players alongside the departing Mark Minichiello who had remained with the Titans since their inaugural year in 2007.

=== Statistics ===
Season	Team	Pld	T	G	FG	Pts
2000	St. George Illawarra Dragons	23	0	0	0	0
2001	St. George Illawarra Dragons	7	0	0	0	0
2002	St. George Illawarra Dragons	20	3	0	0	12
2003	St. George Illawarra Dragons	20	0	0	0	0
2004	St. George Illawarra Dragons	7	0	0	0	0
2005	St. George Illawarra Dragons	23	3	0	0	12
2006	St. George Illawarra Dragons	19	1	0	0	4
2007	Gold Coast Titans	20	4	0	0	16
2008	Gold Coast Titans	9	2	0	0	8
2009	Gold Coast Titans	21	3	0	0	12
2010	Gold Coast Titans	24	3	0	0	12
2011	Gold Coast Titans	21	0	0	0	0
2012	Gold Coast Titans	17	1	0	0	4
2013	Gold Coast Titans	20	0	0	0	0
2014	Gold Coast Titans	4	0	0	0	0
	Totals	255	20	0	0	80

== Footnotes ==
Sporting positions
Preceded by Team Created	Captain; Gold Coast Titans; 2007 – 2009	Succeeded by Scott Prince
Awards
Preceded by Paul Rauhihi	Dally M Prop of the Year; 2005	Succeeded by Roy Asotasi
Preceded by Award Introduced	Gold Coast Titans; Paul Broughton Medal; 2007	Succeeded by Preston Campbell
Preceded by Nathan Friend	Gold Coast Titans; Paul Broughton Medal; 2010 – 2011	Succeeded by Nate Myles
Preceded by Preston Campbell	Gold Coast Titans; Clubman of the Year; 2011	Succeeded by Matt Srama
