= Adam Christensen (rugby league) =

Australian rugby league footballer (born 2002)

Personal information
- Born: 14 April 2002 (age 24) St Leonards, New South Wales, Australia
- Height: 190 cm (6 ft 3 in)
- Weight: 101 kg (15 st 13 lb)

Playing information
- Position: Second-row
Club
Years	Team	Pld	T	G	FG	P
2026–	Gold Coast Titans	1	0	0	0	0
- Source: RLP As of 16 November 2026

Adam Christensen (born 14 April 2002) is an Australian rugby league footballer for the Gold Coast Titans in the National Rugby League (NRL).

== Early life ==
Christensen was born in Sydney, educated in Queensland at Aquinas College, Southport, and is a junior product of Gold Coast club the Runaway Bay Seagulls.

== Career ==
A forward, Christensen was originally with the South Sydney Rabbitohs, where he was named the club's "Best Forward" in the 2024 NSW Cup. He returned to Queensland in 2025 and won a Queensland Cup premiership that season with the Burleigh Bears, scoring a try in the grand final. Subsequently signed by the Titans, Christensen made his first-grade debut in the 2026 NRL season, when he featured off the bench against the Parramatta Eels in round six.
