= Josh Graham =

Australian rugby league & union player

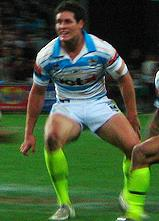

Personal information
- Full name: Josh Graham
- Born: 1 October 1983 (age 42) Taree, New South Wales, Australia
- Height: 190 cm (6 ft 3 in)
- Weight: 105 kg (16 st 7 lb)

Playing information

Rugby union
Club
Years	Team	Pld	T	G	FG	P
2004	Queensland Reds	4	0	0	0	0
2006	Western Force	12	1	0	0	0
	Total	16	1	0	0	0

Rugby league
- Position: Lock, Centre, Second-row
Club
Years	Team	Pld	T	G	FG	P
2005	Melbourne Storm	1	1	0	0	4
2007–10	Gold Coast Titans	66	4	0	0	16
	Ormeau Shearers
	Total	67	5	0	0	20
- Source: As of 18 July 2021

Josh Graham (born 1 October 1983 in Taree, New South Wales, Australia) is a former rugby union and rugby league footballer, having played for a number of clubs in Australia. He last played top-flight rugby for the Gold Coast Titans as Lock.

== Playing career ==
Graham was considered a powerful ball-running lock or centre. Raised in Taree on the mid-North coast of NSW, Graham played rugby union for the First XV at The Southport School and has represented Australia at Schoolboy, Under 21 and Sevens level and had four games with the Queensland Reds before moving to rugby league and the Melbourne Storm. In 2007 Graham returned to rugby league as an inaugural member of the Gold Coast Titans. At the end of the 2010 NRL season, he was released from the Titans team and became the solar super salesman.

== See also ==
- List of players who have converted from one football code to another
