= Selasi Berdie =

Australian rugby league player

Personal information
- Full name: Selasi Berdie
- Born: 3 February 1986 (age 40) Melbourne, Victoria, Australia
- Height: 185 cm (6 ft 1 in)
- Weight: 101 kg (15 st 13 lb)

Playing information
- Position: Prop, Second-row
Club
Years	Team	Pld	T	G	FG	P
2008–09	Gold Coast Titans	2	0	0	0	0
Representative
Years	Team	Pld	T	G	FG	P
2008–10	Queensland Residents	2	1	0	0	4
- Source: As of 5 January 2024

Selasi Berdie (born 3 February 1986) is an Australian former professional rugby league footballer who played two matches with the Gold Coast Titans, as prop. He is believed to be the first player of African descent to play in the National Rugby League.

== Early years ==
Berdie grew up in Melbourne and played tennis before taking up rugby league. Berdie graduated with a double degree in sports science and management in 2008.

== Queensland Cup ==
In 2008 Berdie was signed by the Gold Coast Titans and was assigned to play for a feeder club, the Tweed Heads Seagulls, in the Queensland Cup.

In 2008 he played for Queensland Country and the Queensland Residents sides.

== Gold Coast Titans ==
Berdie made his National Rugby League debut playing for the Gold Coast Titans in round 26 of the 2008 NRL season. In round 23 of the 2009 NRL season, he made one further appearance for the club. Berdie was fondly known by the nickname "Big Bird".
