= Will Matthews (rugby league) =

Australian rugby league footballer

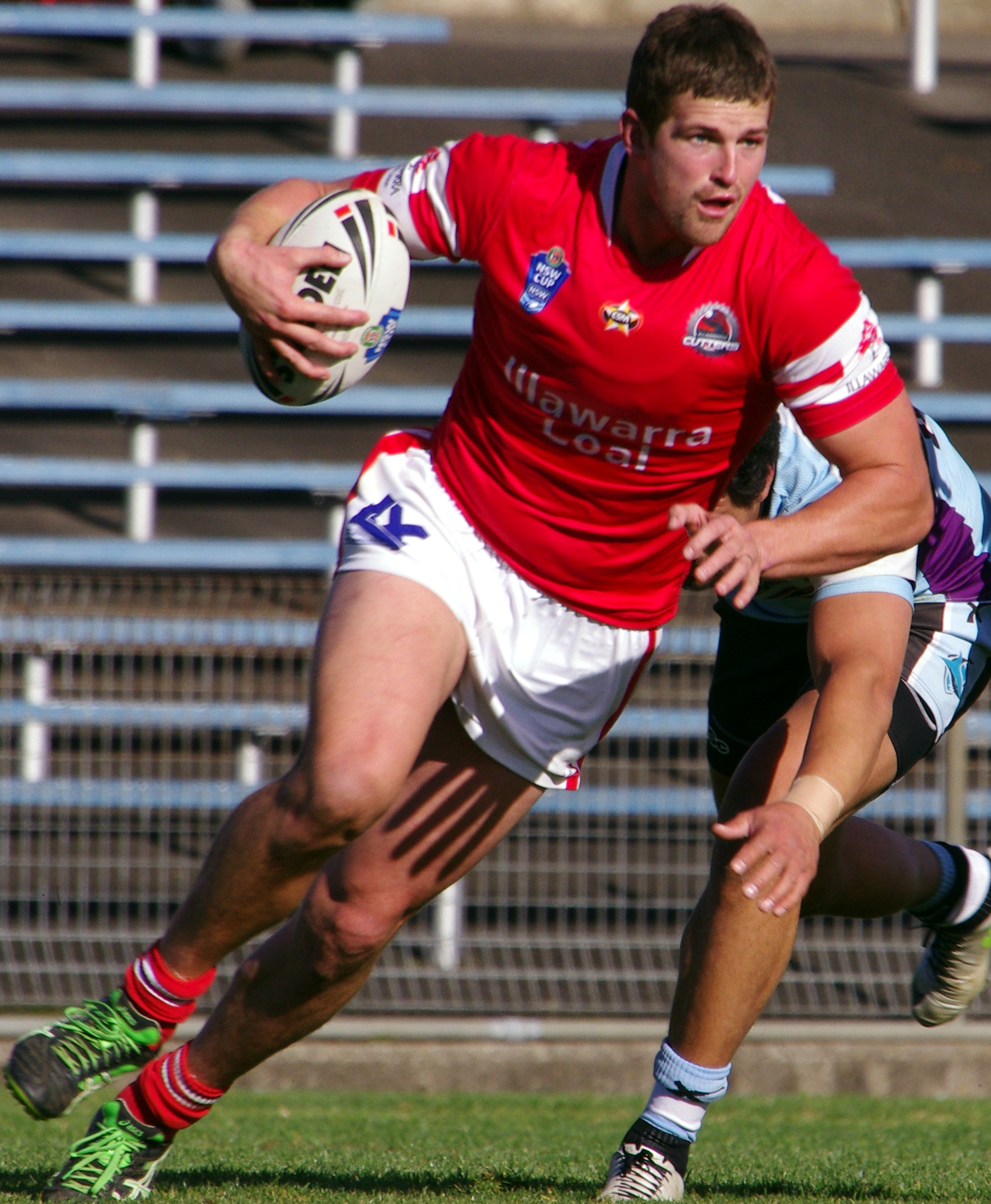

Personal information
- Full name: William Matthews
- Born: 30 March 1988 (age 38) Kyogle, New South Wales, Australia
- Height: 187 cm (6 ft 2 in)
- Weight: 98 kg (15 st 6 lb)

Playing information
- Position: Second-row, Lock
Club
Years	Team	Pld	T	G	FG	P
2008–11	Gold Coast Titans	33	1	0	0	4
2012–17	St. George Illawarra	61	4	0	0	16
2018–19	Gold Coast Titans	17	0	0	0	0
	Total	111	5	0	0	20
Representative
Years	Team	Pld	T	G	FG	P
2015	NSW Residents	1	0	0	0	0
- Source: As of 9 January 2024

Will Matthews (born 30 March 1988) is an Australian former professional rugby league footballer.

He played for the Gold Coast Titans and the St. George Illawarra Dragons in the National Rugby League. Matthews was briefly contracted to the Widnes Vikings in the Super League.

== Background ==
Matthews was born in Kyogle, New South Wales, Australia.

While attending Kyogle High School, he played his junior football for Kyogle Turkeys, before being signed by the Gold Coast Titans.

== Playing career ==
He played for the Tweed Heads Seagulls in the Queensland Cup in 2007 and the Titans' Toyota Cup team in 2008. In round 16 of the 2008 NRL season he made his NRL debut for the Titans against the St. George Illawarra Dragons. In June 2008, Matthews re-signed with the Titans for three years.

On 5 July 2011, Matthews signed a two-year contract with the St. George Illawarra Dragons starting in 2012. Matthews was limited to only five appearances in the 2011 NRL season as the Gold Coast finished last and claimed the wooden spoon. The Gold Coast had the chance to avoid finishing last but lost their final match of the season against Parramatta.

He made his debut for St. George in round 21 of the 2012 NRL season. On 5 September 2013, Matthews re-signed with St. George on a one-year contract.

On 24 October 2014, Matthews again re-signed with St. George on a one-year contract. On 19 June 2015, Matthews re-signed with St. George on a two-year contract. On 8 December 2017, Matthews signed a train and trial contract with NRL club the Gold Coast Titans. Matthews was released by Widnes earlier in the year on compassionate grounds.

At the end of the 2019 NRL season, it was announced that Matthews was retiring from rugby league.

== Representative career ==
Matthews played for the Australian Schoolboys team in 2006.
