= James Stosic =

New Zealand rugby league footballer

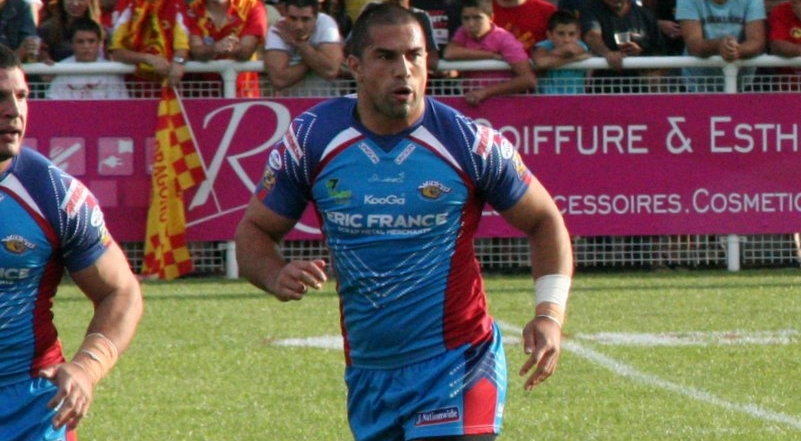

Personal information
- Full name: James Stosic
- Born: 22 September 1981 (age 45) New Plymouth, New Zealand
- Height: 1.82 m (6 ft 0 in)
- Weight: 105 kg (16 st 7 lb)

Playing information
- Position: Prop
Club
Years	Team	Pld	T	G	FG	P
2005–06	Cronulla Sharks	24	0	0	0	0
2007–08	Gold Coast Titans	23	0	0	0	0
2009	Wakefield Trinity Wildcats	18	1	0	0	4
	Total	65	1	0	0	4
- Source: As of 21 January 2019

James Stosic (born 22 September 1981) is a former professional rugby league footballer who last played for the Easts Tigers in the Queensland Cup.

== Early years ==
A Waitara Bears junior, Stosic attended New Plymouth Boys High School and represented Taranaki in 1998 as a 17-year-old alongside his brother Sasho. He attended New Plymouth Boys High. That year Stosic made the New Zealand Secondary School team and the New Zealand 18 years Academy Team. He played for the academy team at the Under 19s Oceania Tournament and was named the forward of the tournament.

== Playing career ==
Stosic previously Wakefield Trinity Wildcats in the Super League competition. His usual position is Prop. He is of New Zealand Māori decent on his mother's side and Macedonian descent on his father's side.

Stosic signed for Wakefield Trinity Wildcats on 10 November 2008. Since then, he has played in 4 Super League matches for the Wildcats, before injuring his leg during the Wildcats victory over Warrington Wolves in round 4. He was out of action for 12 weeks.

== Representative career ==
In 1999 he toured Papua New Guinea with the New Zealand Māori side.

He was named in the Serbian training squad for the 2009 European Cup.
