= Michael Henderson (rugby league) =

Australian rugby league footballer

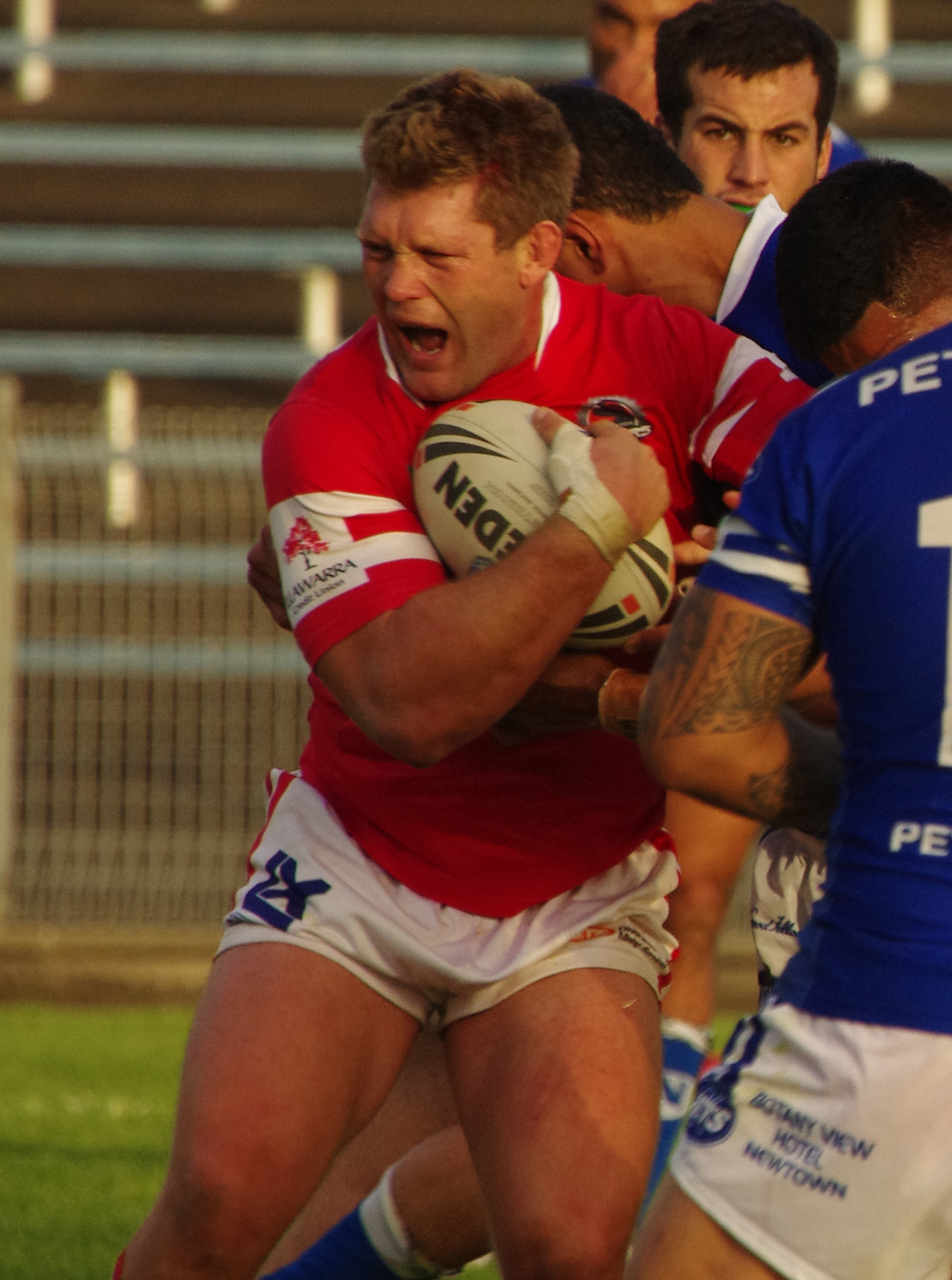
- Henderson playing for the Dragons in 2013

Personal information
- Born: 14 July 1984 (age 42) Griffith, New South Wales, Australia

Playing information
- Height: 186 cm (6 ft 1 in)
- Weight: 103 kg (16 st 3 lb)
- Position: Prop
Club
| Years | Team | Pld | T | G | FG | P |
|---|---|---|---|---|---|---|
| 2003–06 | St. George Illawarra | 40 | 1 | 0 | 0 | 4 |
| 2007–12 | Gold Coast Titans | 78 | 3 | 0 | 0 | 12 |
| 2013 | St. George Illawarra | 1 | 0 | 0 | 0 | 0 |
| | Total | 119 | 4 | 0 | 0 | 16 |

Michael Henderson is an Australian former professional rugby league footballer who played in the 2000s and 2010s. He played in the National Rugby League for the St George Illawarra Dragons and Gold Coast Titans as a prop.

== Playing career ==
Henderson played for the St. George Illawarra Dragons from 2003 to 2006. He then signed with the Gold Coast Titans and was a part of the inaugural Gold Coast Titans team that debuted on 18 March 2007.

He then broke his leg during a game for the Gold Coast Titans in 2007, but returned the following year and performed well enough to have his contract extended until 2012. Henderson played for the Gold Coast in their 2009 and 2010 finals campaigns.

Henderson played 16 games for the Gold Coast in the 2011 NRL season as the club finished last on the table and claimed the wooden spoon.

Henderson returned to St. George Illawarra for the 2013 season but due to several reoccurring injuries was forced to retire from the NRL after only making one further appearance for the club.

== Sources ==
- Whiticker, Alan & Hudson, Glen (2006) The Encyclopedia of Rugby League Players, Gavin Allen Publishing, Sydney
