= Luke O'Dwyer =

Australian rugby league footballer

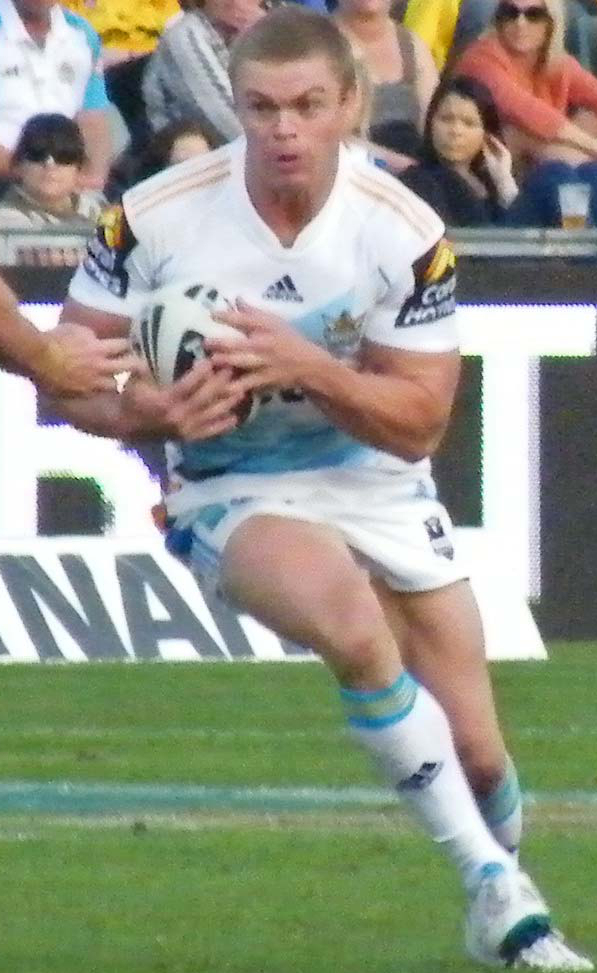

Personal information
- Full name: Luke O'Dwyer
- Born: 30 January 1983 (age 43) Griffith, New South Wales, Australia

Playing information
- Height: 180 cm (5 ft 11 in)
- Weight: 92 kg (14 st 7 lb)
- Position: Centre, Second-row, Lock
Club
Years	Team	Pld	T	G	FG	P
2004–06	Parramatta Eels	26	10	0	0	40
2007–13	Gold Coast Titans	102	19	0	0	76
	Total	128	29	0	0	116

Luke O'Dwyer (born 30 January 1983) is a former professional rugby league footballer who played for the Gold Coast Titans and Parramatta Eels in the National Rugby League competition. A utility player, O'Dwyer played at centre, five-eighth, second row and lock at different times during his career.

== Playing career ==
Raised in the southern Gold Coast town of Tweed Heads, O'Dwyer played his junior football for the Tweed Heads Seagulls. While playing for Seagulls, he caught the eye of the Parramatta coach, Brian Smith.

O'Dwyer made his first grade debut for the Eels in 2004, coming off the bench in their round 1, 26–18, victory over the Brisbane Broncos. He played three seasons at Parramatta including the 2005 NRL season where the club won the Minor Premiership, before getting the chance to move back home to play for the newly formed Gold Coast Titans. A member of their inaugural squad, O'Dwyer became a regular in the side, playing over 100 games for the club. O'Dwyer missed the club's 2009 and 2010 finals appearances through injury and was also part of the Wooden Spoon team of 2011.

== Personal life ==
O'Dwyer is married to wife, Kara, and they have three sons, Jax, Zave and Krue.

Since 2006, in O'Dwyer's home town of Tweed Heads, the two local primary schools, St. Joseph's Primary and St. James' Primary, compete for the annual O'Dwyer Shield. The O'Dwyer Shield is named in memory of Luke O'Dwyer's younger brother, Ryan, who lost his battle against leukaemia in 1998. Ryan was a student at St. Joseph's at the time, while Luke O'Dwyer attended both schools during his youth. The O'Dwyer Shield is an important event in the Tweed Heads community with the Titans being involved every year. In 2010, St. Mary's Primary Casino filled in as a late minute inclusion for St. Joseph's who were unable to play in the match.
