= Kris Kahler =

Australian rugby league footballer

Personal information
- Full name: Kristopher Neil Kahler
- Born: 13 February 1983 (age 43) Gympie, Queensland, Australia
- Height: 194 cm (6 ft 4 in)
- Weight: 108 kg (238 lb; 17 st 0 lb)

Playing information
- Position: Prop, Second-row
Club
Years	Team	Pld	T	G	FG	P
2002	Brisbane Broncos	1	0	0	0	0
2004–06	Canberra Raiders	35	5	0	0	4
2007	Gold Coast Titans	15	0	0	0	0
2009	Baroudeurs de Pia XIII	3	4	0	0	16
2009	Gateshead Thunder	15	3	0	0	12
2010	Redcliffe Dolphins	0	0	0	0	0
	Total	69	12	0	0	32
- Source: As of 19 July 2026

Kris Kahler (born 13 February 1983) is an Australian former professional rugby league footballer who played in the 2000s. He previously played for the Gold Coast Titans in the National Rugby League competition, where he was a part of the inaugural Gold Coast Titans squad. He also played for the Brisbane Broncos and Canberra Raiders.

== Playing career ==
Kahler played for the French Rugby League team Pia Donkeys in the Elite One Championship in the 2009 season.

In 2009, he signed with Gateshead Thunder along with Paul Franze and Nick Youngquest.

Kahler left Gateshead Thunder just before the club went in to administration at the end of the 2009 season returning to Australia to play for the Redcliffe Dolphins. Rumours he would coach at Gateshead Thunder would not come to fruition.
