= Luke Swain =

Australian rugby league footballer

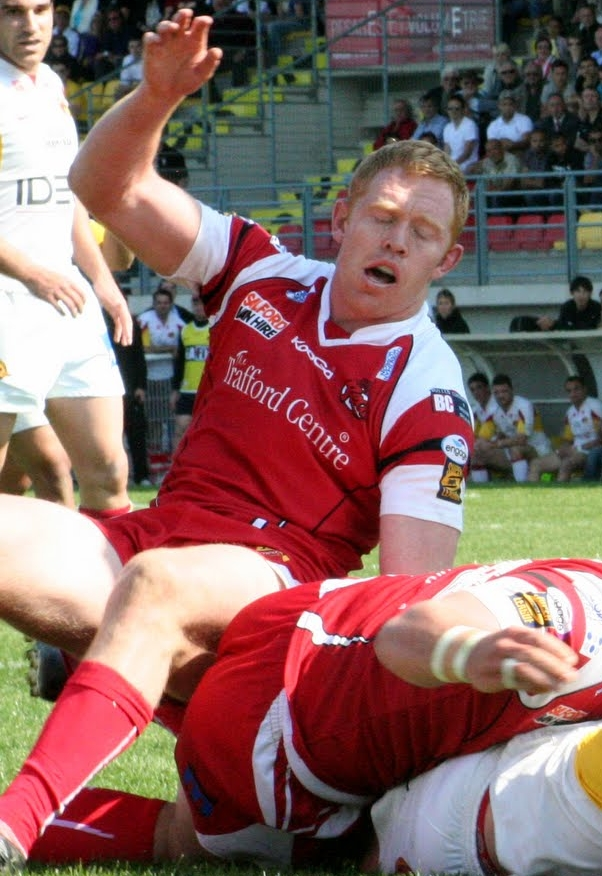

Personal information
- Full name: Luke Swain
- Born: 24 February 1982 (age 44) Penrith, New South Wales, Australia

Playing information
- Height: 185 cm (6 ft 1 in)
- Weight: 98 kg (15 st 6 lb)
- Position: Lock, Second-row
Club
Years	Team	Pld	T	G	FG	P
2003–06	Penrith Panthers	78	6	0	0	24
2007–08	Gold Coast Titans	34	1	0	0	4
2009–10	Salford City Reds	58	4	0	0	16
2010–12	AS Carcassonne	37	12	0	0	48
2012–13	Saint-Estève XIII Catalan	19	0	0	0	0
	Total	226	23	0	0	92

Luke Swain (born 24 February 1982 in Penrith, New South Wales) is an Australian former professional rugby league footballer who played in the 2000s and 2010s. He played for the Salford City Reds of Super League. He previously played in the NRL for the Penrith Panthers and Gold Coast Titans, as a second-row.

He joined French club AS Carcassonne for the 2010/11 season.

Swain played from the interchange bench in the Panthers' 2003 NRL grand final-winning team in their 18–6 win over the Sydney Roosters. As 2003 NRL premiers, the Panthers travelled to England to face Super League VIII champions, the Bradford Bulls in the 2004 World Club Challenge. Swain played from the interchange bench in the Penrith's 22-4 loss.

== Career highlights ==
- First grade debut: Penrith Panthers v Canberra Raiders, 5 April 2003, Round 4 at Penrith Football Stadium.
- Premierships: 2003, Penrith Panthers defeated Sydney Roosters, 18–6.

== Managerial career ==
Swain is the current manager of Sydney Shield side The St Mary's Saints. In The 2017 Sydney Shield season, Swain guided St Mary's to their first ever Sydney Shield premiership with a 34-20 victory over Mounties
