= Michael Hodgson =

Australian rugby league footballer

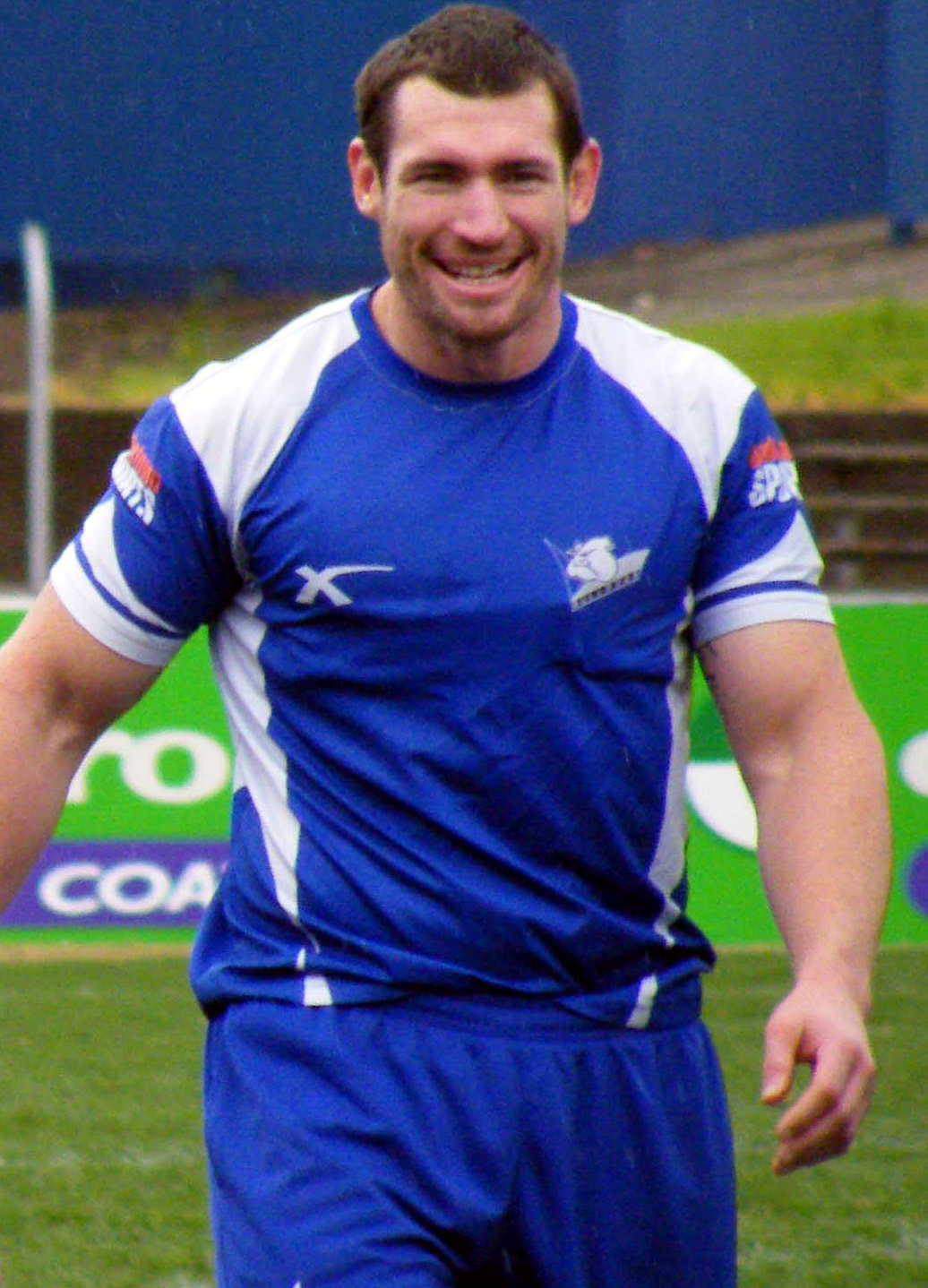

Personal information
- Full name: Michael Hodgson
- Born: 5 November 1979 (age 45); Newcastle, New South Wales, Australia

Playing information
- Height: 6 ft 2 in (187 cm)
- Weight: 16 st 1 lb (102 kg)
- Position: Prop, Second-row
Club
Years	Team	Pld	T	G	FG	P
1998–00	Parramatta Eels	20	4	0	0	16
2001–06	Canberra Raiders	98	8	0	0	32
2007–08	Gold Coast Titans	35	1	0	0	4
2009–11	Canterbury Bulldogs	51	3	0	0	12
	Total	204	16	0	0	64

Michael Hodgson (born 5 November 1979) is an Australian former professional rugby league footballer who played for the Canterbury-Bankstown Bulldogs in the Australian NRL. Hodgson primarily played as a second-row forward and previously played for the Parramatta Eels and the Canberra Raiders.

== Early life ==
While attending St. Francis Xavier College, Hodgson played for the Australian Schoolboys team in 1997.

== Playing career ==
Hodgson made his first grade debut for Parramatta in round 21 1998 against South Sydney. In 2000, Hodgson joined Canberra. In 2003, Canberra enjoyed one of their best seasons on the field since winning the premiership in 1994 finishing 4th on the table with Hodgson making 18 appearances. Canberra then went on to lose both their finals games including a 17-16 loss against New Zealand.

2006 would be Hodgson's last season with Canberra as he had signed to play with the NRL's new franchise the Gold Coast Titans in their inaugural season in 2007. Hodgson finished with the Gold Coast at the end of 2008 and linked up with Canterbury for two years starting in 2009.

Hodgson played 24 games for Canterbury in 2009 as the club finished 2nd on the table. On 25 September 2009, Hodgson played for Canterbury in their preliminary final match against his former club Parramatta. In front of a non-grand final record crowd of 74,549, Canterbury went on to lose the game 22-12.

In 2010 Hodgson was re-signed by Canterbury until the end of 2011. Hodgson retired as a professional rugby league player at the conclusion of the 2011 season.
