= Anthony Laffranchi =

Australia & Italy international rugby league footballer

Anthony "Boof" Laffranchi
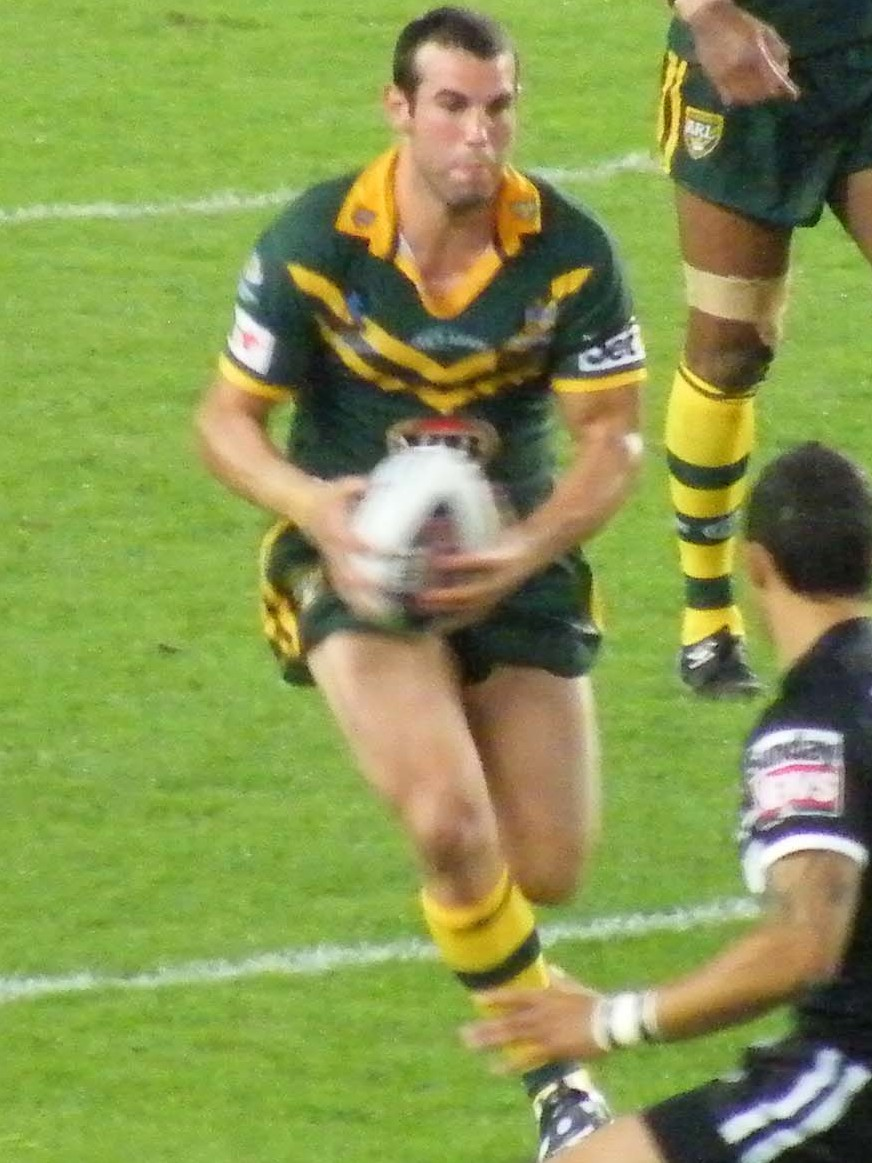

Personal information
- Full name: Anthony Laffranchi
- Born: 16 November 1980 (age 46) Murwillumbah, New South Wales, Australia

Playing information
- Height: 185 cm (6 ft 1 in)
- Weight: 102 kg (16 st 1 lb)
- Position: Second-row, Prop
Club
Years	Team	Pld	T	G	FG	P
2001–06	Wests Tigers	103	18	0	0	72
2007–11	Gold Coast Titans	102	32	1	0	130
2012–14	St Helens	71	19	0	0	76
	Total	276	69	1	0	278
Representative
Years	Team	Pld	T	G	FG	P
2006–10	Country Origin	4	2	0	0	8
2008–09	New South Wales	4	1	0	0	4
2008–09	Australia	5	2	0	0	8
2012–13	Exiles	2	0	0	0	0
2013	Italy	3	0	0	0	0

Anthony Laffranchi (born 16 November 1980) is a former professional rugby league footballer. An Australia and Italy international, and New South Wales State of Origin representative forward, he played in the National Rugby League for the Wests Tigers (with whom he won the 2005 NRL premiership) and the Gold Coast Titans, and for Super League club St Helens.

== Background ==
Laffranchi was born in Murwillumbah, New South Wales, Australia. He attended Mt St Patrick's College and played early football for the Murwillumbah Colts. He is of Italian descent and was eligible to represent the Italy national rugby league team.

== Playing career ==
=== Wests Tigers ===
Laffranchi played at prop forward in the Tigers' 2005 NRL Grand Final victory over the North Queensland Cowboys. As NRL Premiers Wests faced Super League champions Bradford Bulls in the 2006 World Club Challenge. Laffranchi played at second-row forward in the Tigers' 30–10 loss.

=== Gold Coast Titans ===
At the end of the Titans' first season Laffranchi was named co-winner of the club's inaugural Paul Broughton Medal for best and fairest player of the season with teammate Luke Bailey. After further solid performance in 2008, he was selected to play for the City vs Country Origin game, representing Country, in which he was awarded Man of the Match.

Laffranchi was named as the 18th man for the Australians for the Centenary Rugby League Test against New Zealand in 2008.

Laffranchi was selected for New South Wales in game I of the 2008 State of origin series. Laffranchi started from the bench and scored the winning try off a Mark Gasnier line break and lead the tackle count (40) for the Blues.

In August 2008, Laffranchi was named in the preliminary 46-man Kangaroos squad for the 2008 Rugby League World Cup, and in October 2008 he was selected in the final 24-man Australia squad.

Laffranchi made his test début against New Zealand in Australia's opening RLWC 08 game on 26 October playing in the Second-row. He followed this up with a two try effort in Australia's second match of the World Cup. He was selected for Australia in the one-off test match against New Zealand on 8 May 2009. He was also an Italian international.

Laffranchi signed a two-year deal with St. Helens starting in 2012.

=== St Helens ===
Laffranchi commenced his Super League career in the 2012 season with St. Helens.
He played for the Exiles in the International Origin and also represented Italy in the 2013 Rugby League World Cup.

== Post-playing ==
As of 2015 Laffranchi is a member of the Gold Coast Titans administration as the clubs general football manager.

In 2022, Laffranchi was inducted as a life member of the Wests Tigers.
