= 2022 Gold Coast Titans season =

2022 Gold Coast Titans Season
- NRL Rank: 13th

Team information
- CEO: Steve Mitchell
- Coach: Justin Holbrook
- Captain: Tino Fa'asuamaleaui
- Stadium: Robina Stadium
- Avg. attendance: 13,481
- High attendance: 13,481
- Low attendance: 13,481

Top scorers
- Tries: Beau Fermor (11)
- Goals: Toby Sexton (25)
← 2021	List of seasons	2023 →

The 2022 Gold Coast Titans season is the 16th season in the history of Gold Coast Titans rugby league football club. The team is coached by Justin Holbrook and captained by Tino Fa'asuamaleaui. The 2022 season is the first Titans season to feature the new club logo.

The Titans finished 8th in the previous season qualifying for the finals series, for which they were eliminated from in the elimination final by The Sydney Roosters.

== Squad Information ==
As of 12 March 2022

Name	Nat.	Position(s)	Date of birth (Age)	First season at Titans	Previous club	Apps.	Tries	Goals
Backs
Alexander Brimson	(Australia)	FE / FB	9 September 1998 (age 27)	2018	(Queensland) Centenary Panthers	63	25	
Alofiana Khan-Pereira	(Australia)	WG	1 November 2001 (age 24)	2022	(Queensland) Burleigh Bears	0	0	
Brian Kelly	(Australia)	CE / WG	20 May 1996 (age 30)	2019	Manly Warringah Sea Eagles	61	26	
Corey Thompson	(Australia)	WG / FB	15 May 1990 (age 36)	2020	Wests Tigers	30	12	
Esan Marsters	(New Zealand) (Cook Islands)	CE	17 August 1996 (age 29)	2021	North Queensland Cowboys	4	1	
Greg Marzhew	(New Zealand)	WG / CE	4 April 1997 (age 29)	2021	(Victoria (state)) North West Wolves	8	6	
Jayden Campbell	(Australia)	FB	7 February 2000 (age 26)	2021	(Queensland) Helensvale Hornets	7	5	
Jamayne Issako	(New Zealand)	FB / WG	6 June 1996 (age 25	2022	Brisbane Broncos	5	2	
Patrick Herbert	(New Zealand)	CE / WG	10 January 1997 (age 29)	2021	New Zealand Warriors	20	6	
Paul Turner	(New Zealand)	FE / FB / CE	4 July 2000 (age 25)	2022	New Zealand Warriors	0	0	
Phillip Sami	(Australia)	WG / CE / FB	2 August 1997 (age 28)	2017	(Queensland) Brisbane Tigers	73	34	
Shallin Fuller	(Australia)	FE	12 October 1999 (age 26)	2022	(Queensland) Burleigh Bears	0	0	
Sosefo Fifita	(New Zealand)	WG / CE	8 January 2003 (age 23)	2022	(Queensland) Sunnybank Dragons	0	0	
Tanah Boyd	(Australia)	HB / FE / HK	28 July 2000 (age 25)	2019	(Queensland) Runaway Bay Seagulls	21	2	
Thomas Weaver	(Australia)	HB	20 February 2003 (age 23)	2022	(New South Wales) Cudgen Hornets	0	0	
Toby Sexton	(Australia)	HB / FE	1 March 2001 (age 25)	2021	(Queensland) Currumbin Eagles	4	1	
Will Smith	(Australia)	FE / FB / HK	3 July 1992 (age 33)	2022	Parramatta Eels	0	0	
Forwards
Aaron Booth	(Australia)	HK / LK	1 October 1995 (age 30)	2022	Melbourne Storm	0	0	
Beau Fermor	(Australia)	SR / CE	15 August 1998 (age 27)	2020	Newcastle Knights	23	6	
David Fifita	(Australia)	SR	25 February 2000 (age 26)	2021	Brisbane Broncos	22	17	
Erin Clark	(Samoa)	HK	6 September 1997 (age 28)	2020	New Zealand Warriors	29	1	
Herman Ese'ese	(Samoa) (New Zealand)	PR / LK	7 September 1994 (age 31)	2021	Newcastle Knights	3	0	
Isaac Liu	(Samoa) (New Zealand)	PR / LK	26 April 1991 (age 35)	2022	Sydney Roosters	0	0	
Jacob Alick	(Australia)	SR	11 March 1999 (age 23)	2022	(Queensland) Souths Logan Magpies	0	0	
Jaimin Jolliffe	(Australia)	PR	7 November 1996 (age 29)	2020	(New South Wales) Wagga Wagga Kangaroos	41	1	
Jarrod Wallace	(Australia)	PR	23 July 1991 (age 34)	2017	Brisbane Broncos	104	12	
Joseph Vuna	(United States)	SR	31 July 1998 (age 27)	2021	New Zealand Warriors	2	0	
Kevin Proctor	(New Zealand)	SR	28 February 1989 (age 37)	2017	Melbourne Storm	96	18	
Moeaki Fotuaika	(New Zealand)	PR	16 November 1999 (age 26)	2018	(Queensland) Souths Logan Magpies	77	5	
Sam Lisone	(Samoa)	PR	19 February 1994 (age 32)	2020	New Zealand Warriors	34	1	
Sam McIntyre	(Australia)	SR / PR	20 March 1998 (age 28)	2021	Wests Tigers	10	0	
Tino Fa'asuamaleaui (c)	(Samoa)	LK / PR	16 February 2000 (age 26)	2021	Melbourne Storm	22	4	

== Transfers ==
=== Transfers in ===
Date	Position	Player	From	Ref.
7 June 2021	FE / FB / CE	(New Zealand) Paul Turner	New Zealand Warriors	
7 July 2021	PR / LK	(Samoa) (New Zealand) Isaac Liu	Sydney Roosters	
27 August 2021	HK / LK	(Australia) Aaron Booth	Melbourne Storm	
15 October 2021	FE / FB / HK	(Australia) Will Smith	Parramatta Eels	
12 March 2022	SR	(Australia) Jacob Alick	(Queensland) Souths Logan Magpies	
22 March 2022	FB / WG	(New Zealand) Jamayne Issako	Brisbane Broncos	

=== Transfers out ===
Date	Position	Player	To	Ref.
3 August 2021	SR	(Malta) Sam Stone	(England) Leigh Centurions	
3 August 2021	PR / LK	(Australia) Jai Whitbread	(England) Leigh Centurions	
10 August 2021	WG	(Australia) Anthony Don	Retirement	
14 September 2021	HK	(Australia) Mitch Rein	Parramatta Eels	
1 October	HB / FE	(Australia) Ashley Taylor	New Zealand Warriors	
8 October 2021	LK / CE / FE / SR / HK	(Australia) Tyrone Peachey	Wests Tigers	
11 October 2021	HB / FE	(Australia) Jamal Fogarty	Canberra Raiders	

== Friendlies ==
19 February 2022	Gold Coast Titans	26 – 26	Brisbane Broncos	Gold Coast, Australia
19:00 AEST (UTC+10:00)	Tries: Sexton 10'; Spry 23', 43'; Masters 50'; De Groot 58'; Goals: Sexton 11', 25'; Boyd 51'	[Report Report]	Tries: Cobbo 5'; Kotoni Staggs 36'; Mam 66'; Paix 77'; Lee 79'; Goals: Isaako 68', 77', 79'	Stadium: Robina Stadium; Attendance: 4,919; Referee: Chris Butler

28 February 2022	New Zealand Warriors	Cancelled^{a}	Gold Coast Titans	Gold Coast, Australia
19:00 AEST (UTC+10:00)		[Report Report]		Stadium: Robina Stadium

== Competitions ==
=== Overview ===
Competition	First match	Last match	Starting round	Record							
Competition	First match	Last match	Starting round	P	W	D	L	PD	B	Pts	Win%
National Rugby League	13 March 2022	3 September 2022	Round 1	9	2	0	7	−84	0	4	22.22

Last updated: 11 May 2022

=== National Rugby League ===
==== League table ====
2022 NRL season
Pos	Team	Pld	W	D	L	B	PF	PA	PD	Pts
1	Penrith Panthers (P)	24	20	0	4	1	636	330	+306	42
2	Cronulla-Sutherland Sharks	24	18	0	6	1	573	364	+209	38
3	North Queensland Cowboys	24	17	0	7	1	633	361	+272	36
4	Parramatta Eels	24	16	0	8	1	608	489	+119	34
5	Melbourne Storm	24	15	0	9	1	657	410	+247	32
6	Sydney Roosters	24	15	0	9	1	635	434	+201	32
7	South Sydney Rabbitohs	24	14	0	10	1	604	474	+130	30
8	Canberra Raiders	24	14	0	10	1	524	461	+63	30
9	Brisbane Broncos	24	13	0	11	1	514	550	−36	28
10	St. George Illawarra Dragons	24	12	0	12	1	469	569	−100	26
11	Manly Warringah Sea Eagles	24	9	0	15	1	490	595	−105	20
12	Canterbury-Bankstown Bulldogs	24	7	0	17	1	383	575	−192	16
13	Gold Coast Titans	24	6	0	18	1	455	660	−205	14
14	Newcastle Knights	24	6	0	18	1	372	662	−290	14
15	New Zealand Warriors	24	6	0	18	1	408	700	−292	14
16	Wests Tigers	24	4	0	20	1	352	679	−327	10

==== Results by Round ====
Round	1	2	3	4	5	6	7	8	9	10
Ground	A	H	A	H	H	A	A	H	A	H
Result	L	W	L	W	L	L	L	L	L	
Position	10	9	10	9	10	10	12	12	14	

Updated to match(es) played on 13 March 2022. Source: NRL
A = Away; H = Home; W = Win; D = Draw; L = Loss

==== Matches ====
The league fixtures were announced on 9 November 2021

Round 1: 13 March 2022	Parramatta Eels	32 − 28	Gold Coast Titans	Sydney, Australia
15:05 AEST (UTC+10:00)	Tries: Russell 3', 7', 33'; Lane 18'; Blake 23'; Goals: Moses 9', 30', 33'; Penalty goals: Moses 66', 71', 79'	[Report Report]	Tries: Sami 10', 41'; Kelly 23', 37'; Clark 35'; Goals: Sexton 12', 25', 36', 43'	Stadium: Western Sydney Stadium; Attendance: 18,211; Referee: Grant Atkins

Round 2: 19 March 2022	Gold Coast Titans	20 − 18	New Zealand Warriors	Gold Coast, Australia
14:00 AEST (UTC+10:00)	Tries: Fermor 0'; Marzhew 14', 24'; Sami 57'; Goals: Sexton 2', 14'	[Report Report]	Tries: Egan 18'; Montoya 35'; Pompey 39'; Goals: Walsh 20', 37', 40'	Stadium: Robina Stadium; Attendance: 13,481; Referee: Adam Gee

Round 3: 26 March 2022	Canberra Raiders	24 − 22	Gold Coast Titans	Canberra, Australia
18:35 AEST (UTC+10:00)	Tries: Valemei 39'; Timoko 45', 50'; Kris 60'; Nicoll-Klokstad 74'; Goals: Schneider 47', 75'	[Report Report]	Tries: Sami 13'; Kelly 22'; Fermor 28'; Fa'asuamaleaui 35'; Goals: Sexton 23', 29', 37'	Stadium: Canberra Stadium; Attendance: 11,457; Referee: Chris Sutton

Round 4: 31 March 2022	Gold Coast Titans	8 − 6	Wests Tigers	Gold Coast, Australia
19:05 AEST (UTC+10:00)	Tries: Brimson 78'; Goals: Sexton 79'; Penalty goals: Sexton 37'	[Report Report]	Penalty goals: Brooks 40', 68', 75'	Stadium: Robina Stadium; Attendance: 8,774; Referee: Grant Atkins

Round 5: 9 April 2022	Gold Coast Titans	20 − 26	Parramatta Eels	Gold Coast, Australia
19:35 AEST (UTC+10:00)		[Report Report]		Stadium: Robina Stadium

Round 6: 16 April 2022	Manly Warringah Sea Eagles	26 − 18	Gold Coast Titans	Sydney, Australia
17:30 AEST (UTC+10:00)		[Report Report]		Stadium: Brookvale Oval

Round 8: 23 April 2022	North Queensland Cowboys	30 − 4	Gold Coast Titans	Townsville, Australia
17:30 AEST (UTC+10:00)		[Report Report]		Stadium: North Queensland Stadium

Round 8: 29 April 2022	Gold Coast Titans	4 − 18	Penrith Panthers	Gold Coast, Australia
18:00 AEST (UTC+10:00)		[Report Report]		Stadium: Robina Stadium

Round 9: 7 May 2022	Sydney Roosters	44 − 16	Gold Coast Titans	Mackay, Australia
17:30 AEST (UTC+10:00)		[Report Report]		Stadium: BB Print Stadium

== Statistics ==
=== Appearances and contributions ===
As of 12 March 2022

Pos.	Nat.	Name	National Rugby League			Total
Pos.	Nat.	Name	Apps	Tries	Goals	Points
FE / FB	(Australia)	Alexander Brimson	0	0	0	0
WG	(Australia)	Alofiana Khan-Pereira	0	0	0	0
CE / WG	(Australia)	Brian Kelly	1	2	0	8
WG / FB	(Australia)	Corey Thompson				
CE	(New Zealand) (Cook Islands)	Esan Marsters				
WG / CE	(New Zealand)	Greg Marzhew				
FB	(Australia)	Jayden Campbell				
CE / WG	(New Zealand)	Patrick Herbert				
FE / FB / CE	(New Zealand)	Paul Turner				
WG / CE / FB	(Australia)	Phillip Sami				
FE	(Australia)	Shallin Fuller				
WG / CE	(New Zealand)	Sosefo Fifita				
HB / FE / HK	(Australia)	Tanah Boyd				
HB	(Australia)	Thomas Weaver				
HB / FE	(Australia)	Toby Sexton				
FE / FB / HK	(Australia)	Will Smith				
HK / LK	(Australia)	Aaron Booth				
SR / CE	(Australia)	Beau Fermor				
SR	(Australia)	David Fifita				
HK	(Samoa)	Erin Clark				
PR / LK	(Samoa) (New Zealand)	Herman Ese'ese				
PR / LK	(Samoa) (New Zealand)	Isaac Liu				
PR	(Australia)	Jaimin Jolliffe				
PR	(Australia)	Jarrod Wallace				
SR	(United States)	Joseph Vuna				
SR	(New Zealand)	Kevin Proctor				
PR	(New Zealand)	Moeaki Fotuaika				
PR	(Samoa)	Sam Lisone				
SR / PR	(Australia)	Sam McIntyre				
LK / PR	(Samoa)	Tino Fa'asuamaleaui				

=== Try scorers ===
As of 12 March 2022

=== Goalscorers ===
As of 12 March 2022

== See also ==
- 2022 NRL season
- List of Gold Coast Titans' seasons

== Footnotes ==
a. The match was originally scheduled for 14:00 AEST (UTC+10:00) 26 February at Moreton Daily Stadium, where it was postponed to 19:00 AEST (UTC+10:00) 28 February and moved to Robina Stadium due to the 2022 eastern Australia floods. The match was later cancelled for the same reason.
