= 2023 Gold Coast Titans season =

17th Gold Coast Titans season

- NRL Rank: 14th
- 2023 record: Wins: 9; losses: 15
- Points scored: For: 527; against: 653 (Round 27)

Team information
- CEO: Steve Mitchell
- Head Coach: Justin Holbrook (Rounds 1-16); Jim Lenihan (Round 17 onwards)
- Captain: (Australia) Tino Fa'asuamaleaui
- Stadium: Cbus Super Stadium (Capacity: 27,690)
- High attendance: 14,483 (Round 3)
- Low attendance: 12,452 (Round 6)

Top scorers
- Tries: Alofiana Khan-Pereira (18)
- Goals: Tanah Boyd (19)
- Points: Tanah Boyd (38)
← 2022	List of seasons	2024 →

The 2023 Gold Coast Titans season was the 17th in the club's history. With head coaches Justin Holbrook (Rounds 1-16) and Jim Lenihan (Round 17 onwards) and team captain Tino Fa'asuamaleaui, they competed in the National Rugby League's 2023 Telstra Premiership but did not qualify for the finals.

The Titans also fielded a team in the NRL Women's Premiership.

== Season summary ==
- Preseason Challenge – Tanah Boyd kicks a late conversion to draw the Titans first preseason challenge fixture against the Brisbane Broncos 24–all at the Sunshine Coast Stadium. Boyd's conversion coming after Alofiana Khan-Pereira scored a spectacular try. In the second match, Gold Coast thrashed new NRL club the Dolphins 40–12 at Kayo Stadium, with Khan-Pereira scoring four tries.

== Player movement ==
These movements happened across the previous season, off-season and pre-season.

Gains

Player/Coach	Previous club	Length
Kieran Foran	Manly Warringah Sea Eagles	2024
Sam Verrills	Sydney Roosters	2024
Joe Stimson	Canterbury-Bankstown Bulldogs	2024
Aaron Schoupp	Canterbury-Bankstown Bulldogs	2025
Chris Randall	Newcastle Knights	2024

Losses

Player/Coach	New Club
Jarrod Wallace	Dolphins
Jamayne Isaako	Dolphins
Corey Thompson	Retired
Herman Ese'ese	Dolphins
Sam Lisone	Leeds Rhinos
Greg Marzhew	Newcastle Knights
Paul Turner	St. George Illawarra Dragons

== Pre-Season Challenge ==
Date	Round	Opponent	Venue	Score	Tries	Goals	Attendance
Sunday, 12 February	Trial 1	Brisbane Broncos	Sunshine Coast Stadium	24 – 24	Jojo Fifita 15'; Vaka Sikahele 48'; Alofiana Khan-Pereira 56', 73'	Tanah Boyd (3/3); Toby Sexton (1/1)	
Sunday, 19 February	Trial 2	Dolphins	Kayo Stadium	16 – 40	Alofiana Khan-Pereira 3', 9', 11', 68'; Jojo Fifita 17', 24'; Aaron Schoupp 44'; Sam McIntyre 56'	Tanah Boyd (4/8)	7,216

== Regular season ==
=== Ladder ===
2023 NRL season
Pos	Team	Pld	W	D	L	B	PF	PA	PD	Pts
1	Penrith Panthers (P)	24	18	0	6	3	645	312	+333	42
2	Brisbane Broncos	24	18	0	6	3	639	425	+214	42
3	Melbourne Storm	24	16	0	8	3	627	459	+168	38
4	New Zealand Warriors	24	16	0	8	3	572	448	+124	38
5	Newcastle Knights	24	14	1	9	3	626	451	+175	35
6	Cronulla-Sutherland Sharks	24	14	0	10	3	619	497	+122	34
7	Sydney Roosters	24	13	0	11	3	472	496	−24	32
8	Canberra Raiders	24	13	0	11	3	486	623	−137	32
9	South Sydney Rabbitohs	24	12	0	12	3	564	505	+59	30
10	Parramatta Eels	24	12	0	12	3	587	574	+13	30
11	North Queensland Cowboys	24	12	0	12	3	546	542	+4	30
12	Manly Warringah Sea Eagles	24	11	1	12	3	545	539	+6	29
13	Dolphins	24	9	0	15	3	520	631	−111	24
14	Gold Coast Titans	24	9	0	15	3	527	653	−126	24
15	Canterbury-Bankstown Bulldogs	24	7	0	17	3	438	769	−331	20
16	St. George Illawarra Dragons	24	5	0	19	3	474	673	−199	16
17	Wests Tigers	24	4	0	20	3	385	675	−290	14

=== Result by round ===
Round	1	2	3	4	5	6	7	8	9	10	11	12	13	14	15	16	17	18	19	20	21	22	23	24	25	26	27
Ground	A	A	H	A	–	H	H	A	A	N	A	A	–	H	H	–	A	A	H	A	H	H	H	A	H	A	H
Result	W	L	W	L	B	W	L	L	W	W	L	L	B	L	W	B	W	L	L	L	L	W	L	L	L	L	W
Position	2	8	6	11	9	6	10	10	10	7	9	10	9	13	10	9	9	10	11	12	14	12	13	13	13	13	14
Points	2	2	4	4	6	8	8	8	10	12	12	12	14	14	16	18	20	20	20	20	20	22	22	22	22	22	24

Updated to match(es) played on 24 June 2023. Source: National Rugby League
A = Away; H = Home; N = Neutral; B = Bye; W = Win; D = Draw; L = Loss

=== Matches ===
Round 1: 5 March 2023	Wests Tigers	10–22	Gold Coast Titans	Sydney
18:15 AEDT (UTC+11:00)	Tries: Doueihi 45'; Laurie 64'; Goals: Doueihi 1/3 3 (pen)'	[Report Report]	Tries: Sami 13', 23'; McIntyre 41'; Brimson 69'; Goals: Boyd 3/4 14', 24', 43'	Stadium: Leichhardt Oval; Attendance: 14,667; Referee: Peter Gough

Round 2: 12 March 2023	St. George Illawarra Dragons	32–18	Gold Coast Titans	Sydney
18:15 AEDT (UTC+11:00)	Tries: Liddle 31'; B. Hunt 36'; Ravalawa 39'; Sloan 45'; Lawrie 66'; Goals: Lomax 6/8 8 (pen)', 33', 46', 49 (pen)', 53', 67 (pen)'	[Report Report]	Tries: Khan-Pereira 12'; Verrills 18'; T. Fa'asuamaleaui 70'; Goals: Boyd 3/3 13', 20', 71'	Stadium: Netstrata Jubilee Stadium; Attendance: 8,538; Referee: Chris Sutton

Round 3: 18 March 2023	Gold Coast Titans	38–34	Melbourne Storm	Gold Coast
15:00 AEDT (UTC+11:00)	Tries: Khan-Pereira 3', 21'; Kelly 39'; Vuna 41'; Schoupp 46', 73'; Goals: Boyd 7/8 4', 6 (pen)', 40', 43', 47', 60 (pen)', 74'	[Report Report]	Tries: Pezet 10'; Meaney 24', 33'; Sims 30'; Hughes 65'; Coates 75'; Goals: Meaney 5/6 12', 25', 31', 34', 76'	Stadium: Cbus Super Stadium; Attendance: 14,483; Referee: Grant Atkins

Round 4: 25 March 2023	North Queensland Cowboys	24–12	Gold Coast Titans	Townsville
17:30 AEDT (UTC+11:00)	Tries: Nanai 35', (yellow card) 58'; Tamou 44'; Holmes 50'; Chester 72'; Goals: Holmes 4/4 36', 45', 51', 73'	[Report Report]	Tries: Khan-Pereira 3', 56'; Goals: Boyd 2/3 4', 26 (pen)'	Stadium: Queensland Country Bank Stadium; Attendance: 16,426; Referee: Chris Butler

Round 5 (Bye for Gold Coast Titans)

Round 6: 9 April 2023	Gold Coast Titans	20–18	St. George Illawarra Dragons	Gold Coast
16:05 AEST (UTC+10:00)	Tries: Campbell 22'; Sami 53'; Sexton 76'; Goals: Boyd 4/4 23', 32 (pen)', 54', 77'	[Report Report]	Tries: F. Molo (yellow card) 3'; Lomax 17'; Ravalawa 42'; B. Hunt 73'; Goals: Lomax 3/4 19', 35 (pen)', 44'	Stadium: Cbus Super Stadium; Attendance: 12,452; Referee: Peter Gough

Round 7: 15 April 2023	Gold Coast Titans	26–43	Brisbane Broncos	Gold Coast
19:35 AEST (UTC+10:00)	Tries: Sami 4'; Khan-Pereira 22', 79'; T. Fa'asuamaleaui (yellow card) 61'; Leeming 69'; Goals: Boyd 5/5 5', 23', 31 (pen)', 70', 80'	[Report Report]	Tries: Riki 3'; Farnworth 39'; Walsh 50'; Arthars 55'; Capewell 63'; Mam 66'; Cobbo 75'; Goals: Reynolds 7/8 16', 51', 57', 61 (pen)', 65', 67', 76'; Field goals: Reynolds 79'	Stadium: Cbus Super Stadium; Attendance: 26,563; Referee: Todd Smith

Round 8: 23 April 2023	Dolphins	28–26	Gold Coast Titans	Brisbane
14:00 AEST (UTC+10:00)	Tries: Jennings 33', 64'; Nicholls 47'; Wallace 50'; Aitken 74'; Goals: Isaako 4/5 34', 49', 51', 66'	[Report Report]	Tries: Randall 14'; Liu 18'; T. Fa'asuamaleaui 20'; Boyd 26'; Goals: Boyd 5/5 8 (pen)', 16', 19', 22', 28'	Stadium: Suncorp Stadium; Attendance: 22,034; Referee: Chris Butler

Round 9: 29 April 2023	Manly Warringah Sea Eagles	10–26	Gold Coast Titans	Sydney
17:30 AEST (UTC+10:00)	Tries: Sipley (yellow card) 27'; Keppie 50'; Goals: Garrick 3/3 8 (pen)', 51', 55 (pen)'	[Report Report]	Tries: Khan-Pereira 21', 39'; D. Fifita 18'; Sami 60'; Haas 69'; Goals: Boyd 3/6 23', 31', 66 (pen)'	Stadium: 4 Pines Park; Attendance: 10,107; Referee: Ben Cummins

Round 10: 7 May 2023	Gold Coast Titans	26–24	Parramatta Eels	Brisbane
18:25 AEST (UTC+10:00)	Tries: Foran 8', 10'; Khan-Pereira 22', 50'; Kelly 71'; Goals: Boyd 3/5 12', 24', 51'	[Report Report]	Tries: Sivo 1', 42', 54'; Gutherson (yellow card) 7', 56'; Davey 76'; Goals: Moses 1/4 58'; Gutherson 1/1 76'	Stadium: Suncorp Stadium; Attendance: 46,835; Referee: Chris Butler

Round 11: 14 May 2023	Newcastle Knights	46–26	Gold Coast Titans	Newcastle
14:00 AEST (UTC+10:00)	Tries: Young 11', 79'; Frizell 39'; Marzhew 49'; Best 56', 73'; Ponga 60'; Gagai 64'; Goals: Miller 7/9 21 (pen)', 40', 57', 61', 65', 75', 80'	[Report Report]	Tries: D. Fifita 25', 70'; Sami 29'; Campbell 44'; Khan-Pereira 77'; Goals: Boyd 3/5 26', 30', 46'	Stadium: McDonald Jones Stadium; Attendance: 13,064; Referee: Peter Gough

Round 12: 21 May 2023	Canterbury-Bankstown Bulldogs	20–18	Gold Coast Titans	Sydney
14:00 AEST (UTC+10:00)	Tries: Averillo 43'; Addo-Carr 45'; Kiraz 64'; Okunbor 77'; Goals: Burton 2/4 44', 77'	[Report Report]	Tries: D. Fifita 3'; Stimson 31'; Sami 59'; Goals: Boyd 3/4 4', 22 (pen)', 33'	Stadium: Accor Stadium; Attendance: 10,815; Referee: Chris Butler

Round 13 (Bye for Gold Coast Titans)

Round 14: 3 June 2023	Gold Coast Titans	28–46	South Sydney Rabbitohs	Gold Coast
17:30 AEST (UTC+10:00)	Tries: I. Fa'asuamaleaui 6'; Randall 9'; Khan-Pereira 21'; S. Fifita 39'; T. Fa'asuamaleaui 78'; Goals: Boyd 4/5 7', 10', 22', 78'	[Report Report]	Tries: Koloamatangi 13'; Johnston 16', 34', 47'; Graham 43'; Walker 55'; Kennar 72'; Sele 75'; Goals: Taaffe 7/9 14', 36', 44', 56', 70 (pen)', 73', 76'	Stadium: Cbus Super Stadium; Attendance: 18,736; Referee: Liam Kennedy

Round 15: 8 June 2023	Gold Coast Titans	28–12	Wests Tigers	Gold Coast
19:50 AEST (UTC+10:00)	Tries: Brimson 10'; Haas 26'; Campbell 33'; T. Fa'asuamaleaui 57'; Sami 60'; Goals: Boyd 4/5 28', 34', 58', 62'	[Report Report]	Tries: Klemmer 19'; Bula 64'; Goals: Wakeham 2/2 21', 65'	Stadium: Cbus Super Stadium; Attendance: 10,232; Referee: Todd Smith

Round 16 (Bye for Gold Coast Titans)

Round 17: 25 June 2023	Brisbane Broncos	12–18	Gold Coast Titans	Brisbane
14:00 AEST (UTC+10:00)	Tries: Flegler 28'; Mam 61'; Goals: Reynolds 2/2 29', 62'	[Report Report]	Tries: D. Fifita 38'; Kelly 43'; Khan-Pereira 52'; Goals: Boyd 3/4 40', 53', 74 (pen)'	Stadium: Suncorp Stadium; Attendance: 42,249; Referee: Chris Butler

Round 18: 1 July 2023	Canberra Raiders	26–22	Gold Coast Titans	Canberra
15:00 AEST (UTC+10:00)	Tries: Hopoate 1'; Kris 16'; Timoko 49'; Young 73'; Goals: Croker 5/5 3', 17', 51', 74', 77 (pen)'	[Report Report]	Tries: D. Fifita 22'; S. Fifita 42'; Khan-Pereira 62'; T. Fa'asuamaleaui 78'; Goals: Boyd 3/4 24', 64', 78'	Stadium: GIO Stadium; Attendance: 11,659; Referee: Todd Smith

Round 19: 9 July 2023	Gold Coast Titans	21–23	Dolphins	Gold Coast
16:05 AEST (UTC+10:00)	Tries: Foran 27'; Sami 31'; Kelly 65'; Goals: Boyd 4/4 28', 32', 38 (pen)', 67'; Field goals: Boyd 78'	[Report Report]	Tries: Lemuelu 16'; Wallace 47'; K. Bromwich 58'; Isaako 61'; Goals: Isaako 3/5 17', 49', 85 (pen)' Field goals: Isaako 74'	Stadium: Cbus Super Stadium; Attendance: 18,335; Referee: Grant Atkins

Round 20: 16 July 2023	Parramatta Eels	25–24	Gold Coast Titans	Sydney
18:15 AEST (UTC+10:00)	Tries: Campbell-Gillard 5', (yellow card) 25'; Penisini 11'; Sivo (yellow card) 21'; Cartwright 43'; Gutherson 66'; Goals: Moses 4/5 6', 12', 35 (pen)', 67'; Field goals: Moses 74'	[Report Report]	Tries: Khan-Pereira 16', 30'; Sami 28'; Boyd 48'; Goals: Boyd 4/6 29', 40 (pen)', 49', 59 (pen)'	Stadium: CommBank Stadium; Attendance: 12,599; Referee: Chris Butler

Round 21: 22 July 2023	Gold Coast Titans	18–36	Sydney Roosters	Gold Coast
15:00 AEST (UTC+10:00)	Tries: Kelly 65'; Randall 70'; Clark 78'; Goals: Campbell 3/3 66', 70', 78'	[Report Report]	Tries: E. Butcher 10'; Tedesco 13'; Sua'ali'i 22'; Collins 28'; N. Butcher 30'; Baker 46'; Goals: Sua'ali'i 6/7 4 (pen)', 12', 24', 29', 32', 48'	Stadium: Cbus Super Stadium; Attendance: 15,362; Referee: Adam Gee

Round 22: 30 July 2023	Gold Coast Titans	22–13	North Queensland Cowboys	Gold Coast
16:05 AEST (UTC+10:00)	Tries: Brimson 7'; Sami 22'; Campbell 40'; Khan-Pereira 45'; Goals: Boyd 3/4 9', 42', 47'	[Report Report]	Tries: Valemei 10'; Hess 14'; Goals: Holmes 2/2 12', 15'; Field goals: Townsend 39'; Sin bin: Holmes (yellow card) 20' to 30'	Stadium: Cbus Super Stadium; Attendance: 16,516; Referee: Todd Smith

Round 23: 4 August 2023	Gold Coast Titans	18–28	New Zealand Warriors	Gold Coast
18:00 AEST (UTC+10:00)	Tries: D. Fifita 21'; Stimson 51'; Campbell 63'; Goals: Boyd 2/2 23', 64'; Campbell 1/1 53'; Sent off: Fotuaika (red card) 16'	[Report Report]	Tries: Johnson 26', 34'; Ford 42'; Harris 72'; Watene-Zelezniak 75'; Goals: Johnson 4/5 27', 36', 43', 74'; Sin bin: Niukore (yellow card) 18' to 28'	Stadium: Cbus Super Stadium; Attendance: 20,877; Referee: Ben Cummins

Round 24: 11 August 2023	Cronulla-Sutherland Sharks	36–6	Gold Coast Titans	Sydney
18:00 AEST (UTC+10:00)	Tries: Mulitalo 3', 30'; Tracey 17'; McInnes 35'; Graham 44'; Rudolf 63'; Ramien 75'; Goals: Hynes 4/7 18', 36', 46', 64'	[Report Report]	Tries: T. Fa'asuamaleaui 21'; Goals: Boyd 1/1 22'; Sin bin: Clark (yellow card) 66' to 76'	Stadium: PointsBet Stadium; Referee: Ashley Klein

Round 25: 19 August 2023	Gold Coast Titans	14–40	Penrith Panthers	Gold Coast
17:30 AEST (UTC+10:00)		[Report Report]		Stadium: Cbus Super Stadium

Round 26: 26 August 2023	Melbourne Storm	37–16	Gold Coast Titans	Melbourne
15:00 AEST (UTC+10:00)		[Report Report]		Stadium: AAMI Park

Round 27: 3 September 2023	Gold Coast Titans	34–30	Canterbury-Bankstown Bulldogs	Gold Coast
14:00 AEST (UTC+10:00)		[Report Report]		Stadium: Cbus Super Stadium

== 2023 squad ==
Gold Coast Titans squad 2023
Top 30 squad - 2023 NRL season			Development players	Coaching staff
Jacob Alick – SR; Tanah Boyd – HB; AJ Brimson (vc) – FB, CE; Jayden Campbell – FB, FE; Erin Clark – LK; Tino Fa'asuamaleaui (c) – PR, LK; Beau Fermor – SR; David Fifita – SR; Jojo Fifita – WG, CE; Kieran Foran – FE	Moeaki Fotuaika – PR; Klese Haas – SR; Jaimin Jolliffe – PR; Brian Kelly – CE; Alofiana Khan-Pereira – WG; Keano Kini – FB; Kruise Leeming – HK; Isaac Liu – LK, PR; Ken Maumalo – WG; Chris Randall – HK	Phillip Sami – WG, CE; Aaron Schoupp – CE, WG; Treymain Spry – CE, WG; Joe Stimson – SR, PR; Sam Verrills – HK; Joe Vuna – PR; Tom Weaver – HB	Tony Francis – WG; Iszac Fa'asuamaleaui – PR; Seth Nikotemo – SR, LK; Josiah Pahulu – PR, LK	Head coach: Jim Lenihan (Interim); Assistant coach: Brett White; Legend: (c) Captain(s); (vc) Vice-captain(s); Updated: 25 February 2023; Source(s): Titans Team Profiles
