= Junior Kiwis =

New Zealand rugby league team

Team information
- Nickname: Kiwis
- Governing body: NZRL
- Region: Asia-Pacific
- Head coach: Ezra Howe
- Captain: Jordan Riki

Uniforms
First colours

The Junior Kiwis side represents New Zealand in the sport of rugby league.

Since 2010, they are an under-20s side, with players selected from the NRL, Intrust Super Cup, Intrust Super Premiership, Jersey Flegg Cup and Hastings Deering Colts. They are administered by the New Zealand Rugby League.

== History ==
Prior to 2010, the Junior Kiwis consisted of the best New Zealand players aged 18 years or younger and would represent the country against the likes of the Australian Schoolboys, the New South Wales Under 18 side and the England Under 18 side, sometimes as curtain raisers to the senior Kiwi games. Players such as Adam Blair, Thomas Leuluai, Issac Luke, Simon Mannering, Jerome Ropati, Manu Vatuvei and Sonny Bill Williams represented the Junior Kiwis early in their careers and went on to play at the senior level for New Zealand.

In 2010, with the advent of the National Youth Competition, the Junior Kiwis was switched to an under 20s team and played in a two Test series against the Junior Kangaroos. From 2011 to 2018, the Junior Kiwis faced the Junior Kangaroos at the end of each season in a one-off Test match, usually as a curtain raiser to a senior level Australia-New Zealand Test match. In 2019, the side faced the Australian Schoolboys. The side reverted to an under-19 side for the fixture.

== 2010 series ==
=== 1st Test ===
Played as a curtain raiser to the New Zealand-England Four Nations match.

23 October 2010

Junior Kiwis	16 – 24	Junior Kangaroos
Tries; Siuatonga Likiliki 1 Drury Low 1 Shaun Johnson 1 Goals; Shaun Johnson 2	Report	Tries; Dane Gagai 2 Michael Oldfield 1 Justin O'Neill 1 Cameron King 1 Goals; Cameron King 2

Westpac Stadium, Wellington, New Zealand
Referee: Henry Perenara

Junior Kiwis
2010, 1st Test team		Coaching staff
1 Glen Fisiiahi – FB; 2 Bill Tupou – WG; 3 Siuatonga Likiliki – CE; 4 Dean Whare – CE; 5 Drury Low – WG; 6 Carlos Tuimavave – FE; 7 Shaun Johnson – HB; 8 Lama Tasi – PR; 9 Matt McIlwrick – HK; 10 Martin Taupau (c) – PR; 11 Jason Taumalolo – SR; 12 Mark Ioane – SR; 13 Sebastine Ikahihifo – LK	14 Sam Mataora – PR; 15 Nafe Seluini – HK; 16 Sam Lousi – SR; 17 Isaac Maliota – PR	Head coach: David Kidwell; Legend: (c) Captain(s); (vc) Vice-captain(s)

=== 2nd Test ===
Played as a curtain raiser to the New Zealand-Papua New Guinea Four Nations match.

30 October 2010

Junior Kiwis	36 – 20	Junior Kangaroos
Tries; Lama Tasi 1 Drury Low 1 Nafe Seluini 1 Martin Taupau 1 Siuatonga Likiliki 1 Carlos Tuimavave 1 Goals; Shaun Johnson 6	Report	Tries; Michael Oldfield 1 Josh Jackson 1 Dane Gagai 1 Justin O'Neill 1 Goals; Cameron King 2

Rotorua International Stadium, Rotorua, New Zealand
Referee: Shane Rehm

Junior Kiwis
2010, 2nd Test team		Coaching staff
1 Glen Fisiiahi – FB; 2 Bill Tupou – WG; 3 Siuatonga Likiliki – CE; 4 Drury Low – CE; 5 Kane Morgan – WG; 6 Carlos Tuimavave – FE; 7 Shaun Johnson – HB; 8 Mark Ioane – PR; 9 Matt McIlwrick – HK; 10 Martin Taupau (c) – PR; 11 Sam Mataora – SR; 12 Lama Tasi – SR; 13 Sebastine Ikahihifo – LK	14 Nafe Seluini – HK; 15 Sam Lousi – PR; 16 Isaac Maliota – PR; 17 Pakisonasi Afu – LK	Head coach: David Kidwell; Legend: (c) Captain(s); (vc) Vice-captain(s)

== 2011 match ==
Played as a curtain raiser to the Australia-New Zealand pre-Four Nations tournament match. Both coaches agreed to allow an 18th man be used during the match.

16 October 2011

Junior Kangaroos	16 – 28	Junior Kiwis
Tries; Dane Gagai 2 Stewart Mills 1 Kane Evans 1 Goals; Chad Townsend 2	Report	Tries; Sebastine Ikahihifo 2 John Palavi 1 Michael Parker-Walshe 1 Wayne Ulugia 1 Goals; Siliva Havili 3 Sio Siua Taukeiaho 1

Ausgrid Stadium, Newcastle, Australia
Referee: Adam Gee

Junior Kiwis
2011 team		Coaching staff
1 Omar Slaimankhel – FB; 2 Wayne Ulugia – WG; 3 Sosaia Feki – CE; 4 Adam Henry – CE; 5 Andrew Pelasio – WG; 6 Carlos Tuimavave (c) – FE; 7 Michael Parker-Walshe – HB; 8 Josh Papalii – PR; 9 Siliva Havili – HK; 10 Ben Murdoch-Masila – PR; 11 Tohu Harris – SR; 12 Jason Taumalolo – SR; 13 Sebastine Ikahihifo – LK	14 Sio Siua Taukeiaho – SR; 15 Sam Lousi – PR; 16 John Palavi – PR; 17 Kenneath Bromwich – SR; 18 Agnatius Paasi – PR	Head coach: David Kidwell; Legend: (c) Captain(s); (vc) Vice-captain(s)

== 2012 match ==
Played as a curtain raiser to the Australia-New Zealand end of year Test match.

13 October 2012

Junior Kangaroos	48 – 16	Junior Kiwis
Tries; Edrick Lee 2 Jack Wighton 2 Cheyse Blair 1 Tautau Moga 1 David Klemmer 1 Mahe Fonua 1 Jack Stockwell 1 Goals; Jacob Miller 6	Report	Tries; Ngataua Hukatai 2 David Fusitua 1 Carlos Tuimavave 1

Dairy Farmers Stadium, Townsville, Australia
Referee: Gavin Reynolds

Junior Kiwis
2012 team		Coaching staff
1 Roger Tuivasa-Sheck – FB; 2 Wayne Ulugia – WG; 3 Curtis Rona – CE; 4 Ngataua Hukatai – CE; 5 David Fusitua – WG; 6 Carlos Tuimavave (c) – FE; 7 Penani Manumalealii – HB; 8 Mosese Fotuaika – PR; 9 Siliva Havili – HK; 10 Sauaso Sue – PR; 11 Jason Taumalolo (c) – SR; 12 Tohu Harris – SR; 13 David Bhana – LK	14 Tupou Sopoaga – SR; 15 Api Pewhairangi – FE; 16 Toka Likiliki – PR; 17 Peta Hiku – FB	Head coach: John Ackland; Legend: (c) Captain(s); (vc) Vice-captain(s)

== 2013 match ==
13 October 2012

Junior Kangaroos	38 – 26	Junior Kiwis
Tries; Patrick Mago 2 Vai Toutai 1 Junior Paulo 1 David Nofoaluma 1 Charly Runciman 1 Mitch Cornish 1 Goals; Bryce Cartwright 5	Report	Tries; Kurtis Rowe 2 Dallin Watene-Zelezniak 2 Raymond Faitala-Mariner 1 Goals; Mason Lino 3

WIN Jubilee Oval, Kogarah, Australia
Referee: Henry Perenara

Junior Kiwis
2013 team		Coaching staff
1 Kurtis Rowe – FB; 2 Dallin Watene-Zelezniak – WG; 3 Jeremy Hawkins – CE; 4 Ngani Laumape – CE; 5 David Fusitua – WG; 6 Tuimoala Lolohea – FE; 7 Mason Lino – HB; 8 Albert Vete – PR; 9 Manaia Cherrington – HK; 10 James Taylor – PR; 11 Raymond Faitala-Mariner – SR; 12 Joseph Tapine – SR; 13 David Bhana (c) – LK	14 Mitch Clark – PR; 15 David Minute – PR; 16 Zach Dockar-Clay – HK; 17 Takai Moeakiola – SR	Head coach: Brent Gemmell; Legend: (c) Captain(s); (vc) Vice-captain(s)

== 2014 match ==
18 October 2014

Junior Kiwis	15 – 14	Junior Kangaroos
Tries; Sam Manuleleua 1 Kodi Nikorima 1 Chance Peni 1 Goals; Zach Dockar-Clay 1 Field Goals; Te Maire Martin 1	Report	Tries; Valentine Holmes 2 Jake Mamo 1 Goals; Clinton Gutherson 1

Mt Smart Stadium, Auckland, New Zealand
Referee: Shane Rehm

Junior Kiwis
2014 team		Coaching staff
1 Kodi Nikorima – FB; 2 Chance Peni – WG; 3 Taane Milne – CE; 4 Watson Heleta – CE; 5 Sam Manuleleua – WG; 6 Te Maire Martin – FE; 7 Zach Dockar-Clay – HB; 8 Sam Lisone – PR; 9 Manaia Cherrington (c) – HK; 10 Addin Fonua-Blake – PR; 11 Joseph Tapine – SR; 12 Nelson Asofa-Solomona – SR; 13 Josh Aloiai – LK	14 Danny Levi – HK; 15 Lamar Liolevave – SR; 16 Braden Uele – PR; 17 Adam Tuimavave-Gerrard – SR	Head coach: Brent Gemmell; Legend: (c) Captain(s); (vc) Vice-captain(s)

== 2015 match ==
Played as a curtain raiser to the Papua New Guinea-Fiji Melanesian Cup match and the Samoa-Tonga Polynesian Cup match.

2 May 2015

Junior Kangaroos	22 – 20	Junior Kiwis
Tries; Valentine Holmes 1 Robert Jennings 1 Brenko Lee 1 Tepai Moeroa 1 Goals; Jackson Hastings 2 Valentine Holmes 1	Report	Tries; Watson Heleta 1 Joseph Manu 1 Te Maire Martin 1 Tony Tumusa 1 Goals; Zach Dockar-Clay 2

Cbus Super Stadium, Gold Coast, Australia
Referee: Grant Atkins

Junior Kiwis
2015 team		Coaching staff
1 Jamayne Isaako – FB; 2 Tony Tumusa – WG; 3 Taane Milne – CE; 4 Watson Heleta – CE; 5 Joseph Manu – WG; 6 Te Maire Martin – FE; 7 Zach Dockar-Clay (c) – HB; 8 Nelson Asofa-Solomona – PR; 9 Sione Katoa – HK; 10 James Fisher-Harris – PR; 11 Lamar Liolevave – SR; 12 Marata Niukore – SR; 13 Jazz Tevaga – LK	14 Danny Levi – HK; 15 Braden Uele – PR; 16 Toafofoa Sipley – PR; 17 Renouf To'omaga – SR	Head coach: Kelvin Wright; Legend: (c) Captain(s); (vc) Vice-captain(s)

== 2016 match ==
Played as a curtain raiser to the Papua New Guinea-Fiji Melanesian Cup match and the Samoa-Tonga Polynesian Cup match.

7 May 2016

Junior Kangaroos	34 – 20	Junior Kiwis
Tries; Nathan Cleary 1 JJ Felise 1 Robert Jennings 1 Brian Kelly 1 Curtis Scott 1 Connor Watson 1 Goals; Nathan Cleary 5	Report	Tries; Mafoa'aeata Hingano 2 Siosifa Talakai 1 Ken Tofilau 1 Goals; Jamayne Isaako 2

Pirtek Stadium, Parramatta, Australia
Referee: David Munro

Junior Kiwis
2016 team		Coaching staff
1 Brad Abbey – FB; 2 Greg Leleisiuao – WG; 3 Patrick Herbert – CE; 4 Reimis Smith – CE; 5 Ken Tofilau – WG; 6 Jamayne Isaako – FE; 7 Mafoa'aeata Hingano (c) – HB; 8 Poasa Faamausili – PR; 9 Brandon Smith – HK; 10 Cowen Epere – PR; 11 Marata Niukore – SR; 12 Esan Marsters – SR; 13 Tom Amone – LK	14 Siosifa Talakai – CE; 15 Nathaniel Roache – HK; 16 Isaiah Papali'i – PR; 17 Kurt Bernard – PR	Head coach: Kelvin Wright; Legend: (c) Captain(s); (vc) Vice-captain(s)

== 2017 match ==
Played as a curtain raiser to the 2017 Anzac Test.

6 May 2017

Junior Kangaroos	46 – 22	Junior Kiwis
Tries; Tyronne Roberts-Davis 2 Reece Robson 2 Corey Allan 1 Jai Field 1 Victor Radley 1 Jaydn Su'A 1 Goals; Jai Field 5		Tries; 1 Dane Aukafolau; 1 Jarome Luai; 1 Steven Marsters; 1 Briton Nikora Goals; 3 Patrick Herbert

GIO Stadium, Canberra, Australia
Referee: Phil Henderson

Junior Kiwis
2017 team		Coaching staff
1 Steven Marsters – FB; 2 Greg Marzhew – WG; 3 Reimis Smith – CE; 4 Dane Aukafolau – CE; 5 Patrick Herbert – WG; 6 Chanel Harris-Tavita – FE; 7 Jarome Luai (c) – HB; 8 Emry Pere – PR; 9 Erin Clark – HK; 10 Fabien Paletua-Kiri – PR; 11 Briton Nikora – SR; 12 Siosifa Talakai – SR; 13 Isaiah Papali'i – LK	14 Manase Fainu – HK; 15 Moeaki Fotuaika – PR; 16 Kaleb Fuimaono – PR; 17 Sitili Tupouniua – SR	Head coach: Nathan Cayless; Legend: (c) Captain(s); (vc) Vice-captain(s); Updated: 4 May 2017; Source(s):

== 2018 match ==
Played as a curtain raiser to the Australia-New Zealand end of year Test match.

13 October 2018

Junior Kiwis	24 – 40	Junior Kangaroos
Tries; Jackson Ferris 1 Steven Marsters 1 Sean Mullany 1 Isaiah Papali'i 1 Joseph Vuna 1 Goals; Chanel Harris-Tavita 2/5	Report	Tries; 2 Tino Fa'asuamaleaui; 2 Enari Tuala; 1 Corey Allan; 1 Tom Flegler; 1 Louis Geraghty; Goals; 6/7 Zac Lomax

Mt Smart Stadium, Auckland, New Zealand
Referee: Chris McMillan

Junior Kiwis
2018 team		Coaching staff
1 Hayze Perham – FB; 2 Steven Marsters – WG; 3 Morgan Harper – CE; 4 Jackson Ferris – CE; 5 Mawene Hiroti – WG; 6 Dean Blore – FE; 7 Chanel Harris-Tavita – HB; 8 Emry Pere – PR; 9 Sean Mullany – HK; 10 Tom Ale – PR; 11 Isaiah Papali'i (c) – SR; 12 Joseph Vuna – SR; 13 Kelma Tuilagi – LK	14 Paul Roache – FE; 15 Peter Hola – PR; 16 Lucky Ta'avale – SR; 17 Jordan Riki – SR	Head coach: Ezra Howe; Legend: (c) Captain(s); (vc) Vice-captain(s); Updated: 10 October 2018; Source(s): NZRL

== 2019 match ==
Played as a curtain raiser to the 2019 Queensland Cup Grand Final.

29 September 2019

Australian Schoolboys	36 – 20	Junior Kiwis
Tries; Max Feagai 1 Jack Howarth 1 Hamiso Tabuai-Fidow 1 Jackson Topine 1 Sam Walker 1 Reece Walsh 1 Goals; Reece Walsh 6/6	Report	Tries; 2 Starford To'a; 1 Kayal Iro; 1 Selestino Ravutaumada Goals; 2/4 Sione Moala

Dolphin Stadium, Redcliffe, Australia
Referee: Wyatt Raymond

Junior Kiwis
2019 team		Coaching staff
1 Starford To'a – FB; 2 Asu Kepaoa – WG; 3 Kayal Iro – CE; 4 Vito Tevaga – CE; 5 Selestino Ravutaumada – WG; 6 Paul Turner – FE; 7 Sione Moala – HB; 8 Etuale Lui – PR; 9 Tyler Slade – HK; 10 Griffin Neame – PR; 11 Christian Tuipulotu – SR; 12 Charbel Tasipale – SR; 13 Jordan Riki (c) – LK	14 Temple Kalepo – HK; 15 Daniel Ticehurst – PR; 16 Isaiah Vagana – LK; 17 Junior Pua – PR	Head coach: Ezra Howe; Legend: (c) Captain(s); (vc) Vice-captain(s); Updated: 29 September 2019; Source(s): NZRL

== Players ==
=== Captains ===
- Martin Taupau (2010)
- Carlos Tuimavave (2011–2012)
- Jason Taumalolo (2012)
- David Bhana (2013)
- Manaia Cherrington(2014)
- Zach Dockar-Clay (2015)
- Mafoa'aeata Hingano (2016)
- Jarome Luai (2017)
- Isaiah Papali'i (2018)
- Jordan Riki (2019)

== Coaches ==
- David Kidwell (2010–2011)
- John Ackland (2012)
- Brent Gemmell (2013–2014)
- Kelvin Wright (2015–2016)
- Nathan Cayless (2017)
- Ezra Howe (2018–)

== See also ==
- New Zealand national rugby league team
- New Zealand Māori rugby league team
