= Patrick Herbert =

NZ rugby league player (born 1997)

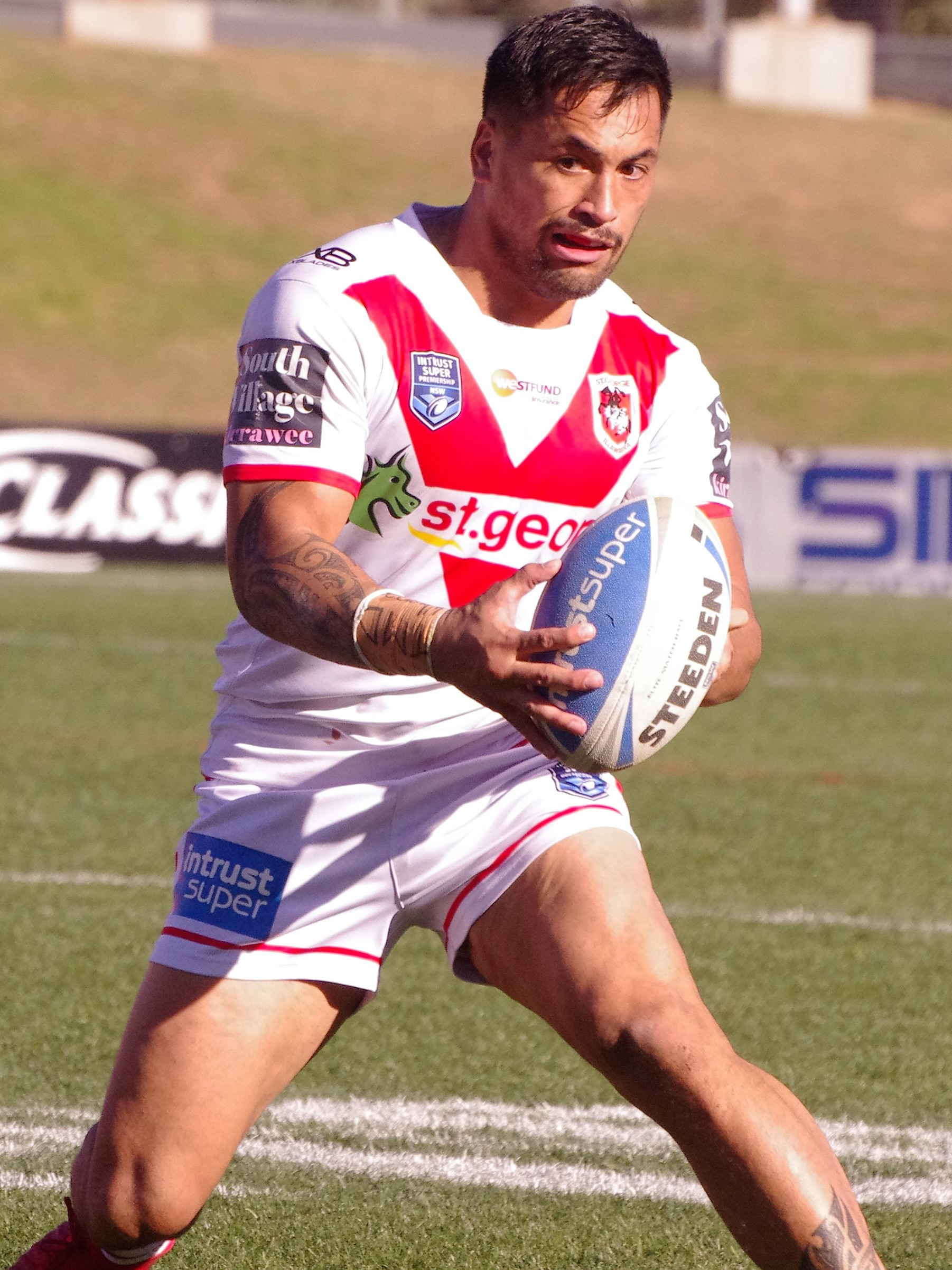

Personal information
- Born: 10 January 1997 (age 29) Whakatāne, Bay of Plenty, New Zealand
- Height: 181 cm (5 ft 11 in)
- Weight: 94 kg (14 st 11 lb)

Playing information
- Position: Centre, Wing
Club
Years	Team	Pld	T	G	FG	P
2019–20	New Zealand Warriors	21	10	18	0	76
2021–23	Gold Coast Titans	38	7	0	0	28
2026–	Wests Tigers	13	1	1	0	6
	Total	72	18	19	0	110
Representative
Years	Team	Pld	T	G	FG	P
2021–22	Māori All Stars	2	0	2	0	4
- Source: As of 6 September 2026

Patrick Herbert (born 10 January 1997) is a New Zealand rugby league footballer who plays as a centre for the Wests Tigers in the NRL.

Herbert previously played for the New Zealand Warriors and Gold Coast Titans in the National Rugby League.

== Background ==
Herbert was born in Whakatāne, New Zealand.

He played junior rugby union for the Tamaki Rugby Club.

== Playing career ==
=== 2015 ===
In 2015 Herbert made the switch to rugby league and signed with St. George Illawarra.

=== 2016 ===
In 2016 he re-signed with St. George, keeping him with the club until at least the end of 2018.

=== 2018 ===
In 2018 he signed a three-year deal with the New Zealand Warriors, effective from the 2019 NRL season.

=== 2019 ===
In Round 7 of the 2019 NRL season Herbert made his NRL debut for the New Zealand Warriors against the Melbourne Storm at centre, in place of the injured Solomone Kata.

=== 2020 ===
After Herbert dropped the ball over the line against Cronulla-Sutherland in round 10 of the 2020 NRL season, he struggled to regain a place in the New Zealand Warriors team and was subsequently released.

=== 2021 ===
During the first week of the NRL finals series, the Gold Coast Titans trailed the Sydney Roosters 25–24 with less than one minute remaining in the elimination final. After the Gold Coast Titans made a break, the ball was passed to Herbert, who then proceeded to throw a flick pass over the sideline despite being supported by two fellow Gold Coast players, who could have potentially scored the match-winning try.

=== 2022 ===
Herbert made 18 appearances for the Gold Coast in the 2022 NRL season scoring one try. The Gold Coast would finish the season 13th on the table and miss the finals.

=== 2023 ===
On 27 March, Herbert was granted an immediate release from his Gold Coast contract. After leaving the Titans, he was due to head to Europe to pursue an opportunity in the Super League, however he ruptured his Achilles heel and stepped away from Rugby League to recover.

=== 2026 ===
On 18 November 2025, after a three year hiatus from Rugby League and having pursued work as an excavator, the Wests Tigers announced that Herbert had joined the team on a train and trial deal. On 18 February 2026, the Wests Tigers announced that Herbert had signed a two-year permanent deal until the end of 2027. Herbert made his Wests Tigers debut on April 12 in a 42-22 win over the Newcastle Knights. Herbert ran for 179 metres, had two line breaks, scored one try and assisted another in the game.

== Statistics ==
Year	Team	Games	Tries	Goals	Pts
2019	New Zealand Warriors	9	3	15	42
2020	New Zealand Warriors	13	7	3	34
2021	Gold Coast Titans	20	6		24
2022	Gold Coast Titans	18	1		4
2026	Wests Tigers	13	1		4
2027	Wests Tigers				
	Totals	72	18	19	104
