= Sione Katoa (rugby league, born 1995) =

Tonga international rugby league footballer

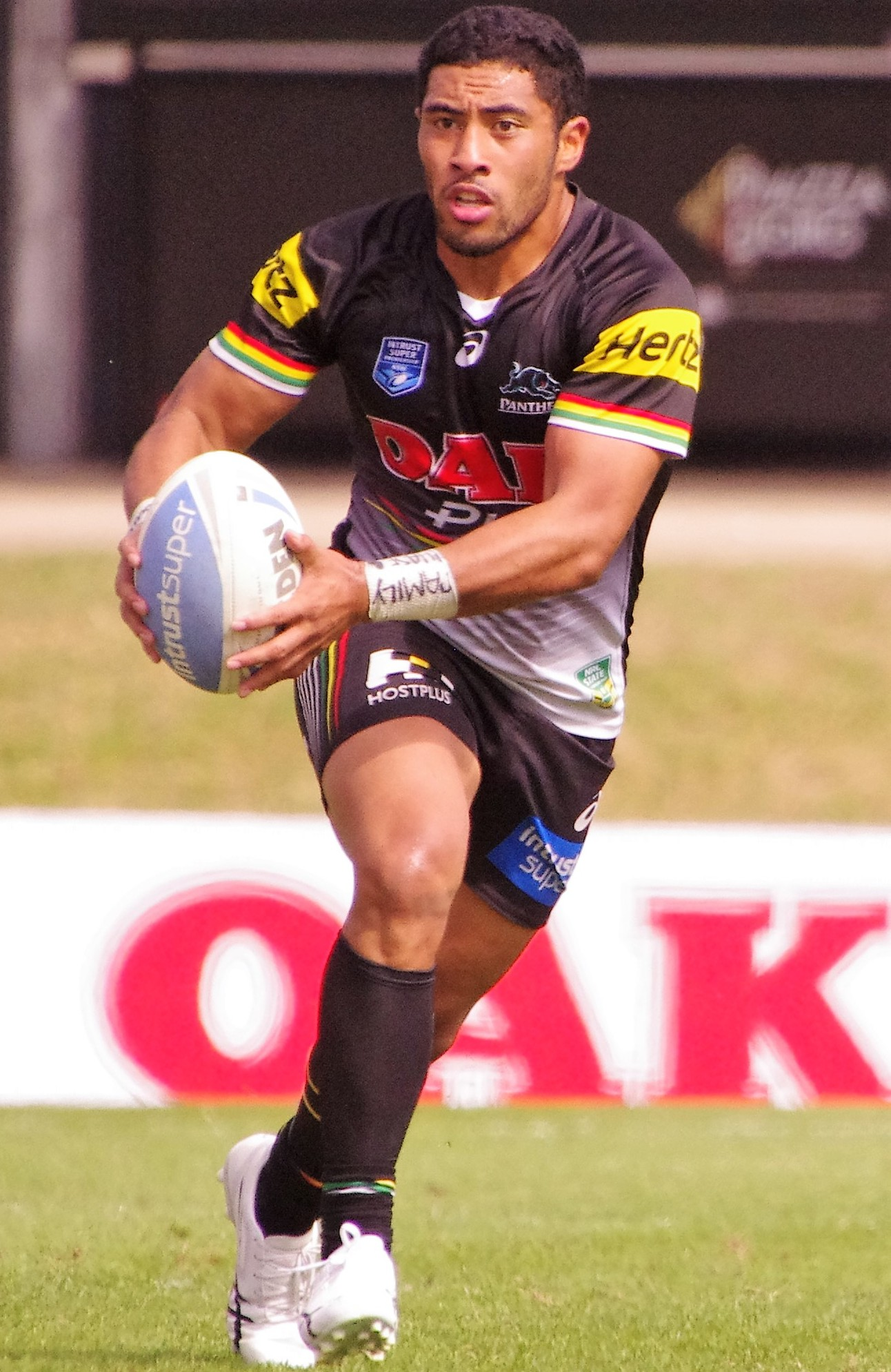

Personal information
- Full name: Sione Utia-Katoa
- Born: 26 January 1995 (age 31) Lower Hutt, Wellington, New Zealand
- Height: 175 cm (5 ft 9 in)
- Weight: 93 kg (14 st 9 lb)

Playing information
- Position: Hooker
Club
Years	Team	Pld	T	G	FG	P
2015–19	Penrith Panthers	47	0	0	0	0
2020–21	Canterbury Bulldogs	28	0	0	0	0
	Total	75	0	0	0	0
Representative
Years	Team	Pld	T	G	FG	P
2016–19	Tonga	11	1	0	0	4
2019	Tonga 9s	3	0	0	0	0
- Source: As of 7 October 2026
- Relatives: Isaiya Katoa (brother)

Sione Katoa (born 26 January 1995) is a Tonga international rugby league footballer who last played for the Canterbury-Bankstown Bulldogs in the NRL.

He previously played for the Penrith Panthers in the National Rugby League.

== Background ==
Katoa was born in Lower Hutt, Wellington, New Zealand, and is of Tongan and Cook Island descent, and attended St. Bernard's College, Lower Hutt.

He came from a rugby background and played all of his junior rugby at Avalon Junior RFC. He represented rugby at Hutt and Wellington age grades before deciding to try rugby league. Most of his junior league was played at the Randwick Kingfishers and Upper Hutt Tigers, before moving to Australia and being signed by the Sydney Roosters. He played junior rugby league for the Glenmore Park Brumbies in the Penrith District Rugby League.

His brother Isaiya Katoa is a fellow Tonga international.

== Playing career ==
=== Early career ===
In 2013, Katoa joined the Penrith Panthers and played for their NYC team in 2014 and 2015.

=== 2015 ===
In 2015, Katoa graduated on to the Panthers' New South Wales Cup team and captained the side later. On 2 May, he played for the Junior Kiwis against the Junior Kangaroos. On 10 June, he re-signed with the Panthers on a 2-year contract. In Round 26 of the 2015 NRL season, he made his NRL debut for the Panthers against the Newcastle Knights. On 11 September, he was named in the 58-man Tonga squad to play the Cook Islands on 17 October.

=== 2016 ===
In February, Katoa played for the Panthers in the 2016 NRL Auckland Nines. On 7 May, he made his international debut for Tonga against Samoa in the 2016 Polynesian Cup.

=== 2017 ===
Katoa was a member of the Penrith Panthers side that won the 2017 Intrust Super Premiership NSW and the 2017 NRL State Championship.

=== 2018 ===
Katoa made 20 appearances for Penrith in the 2018 NRL season as the club finished 5th and reached the elimination final before being defeated by Cronulla-Sutherland 21-20 at the Sydney Football Stadium.

=== 2019 ===
Katoa made a total of 15 appearances for Penrith in the 2019 NRL season as the club finished 10th on the table and missed out on the finals for the first time since 2015.. It was a disappointing end to the season for Penrith as they had been tipped by many to reach the finals series and be one of the contenders for the premiership. At one stage of the season, the club sat last on the table before a mid-season revival lifted them off the bottom to finish just outside the finals places.

In September 2019, Katoa signed a two-year deal to join Canterbury-Bankstown.

=== 2020 & 2021 ===
On 31 August, Katoa was one of twelve players who were told by Canterbury that they would not be offered a contract for the 2022 season and would be released at seasons end.
