= Jaimin Jolliffe =

Ireland international rugby league footballer

Jimmy Jolliffe
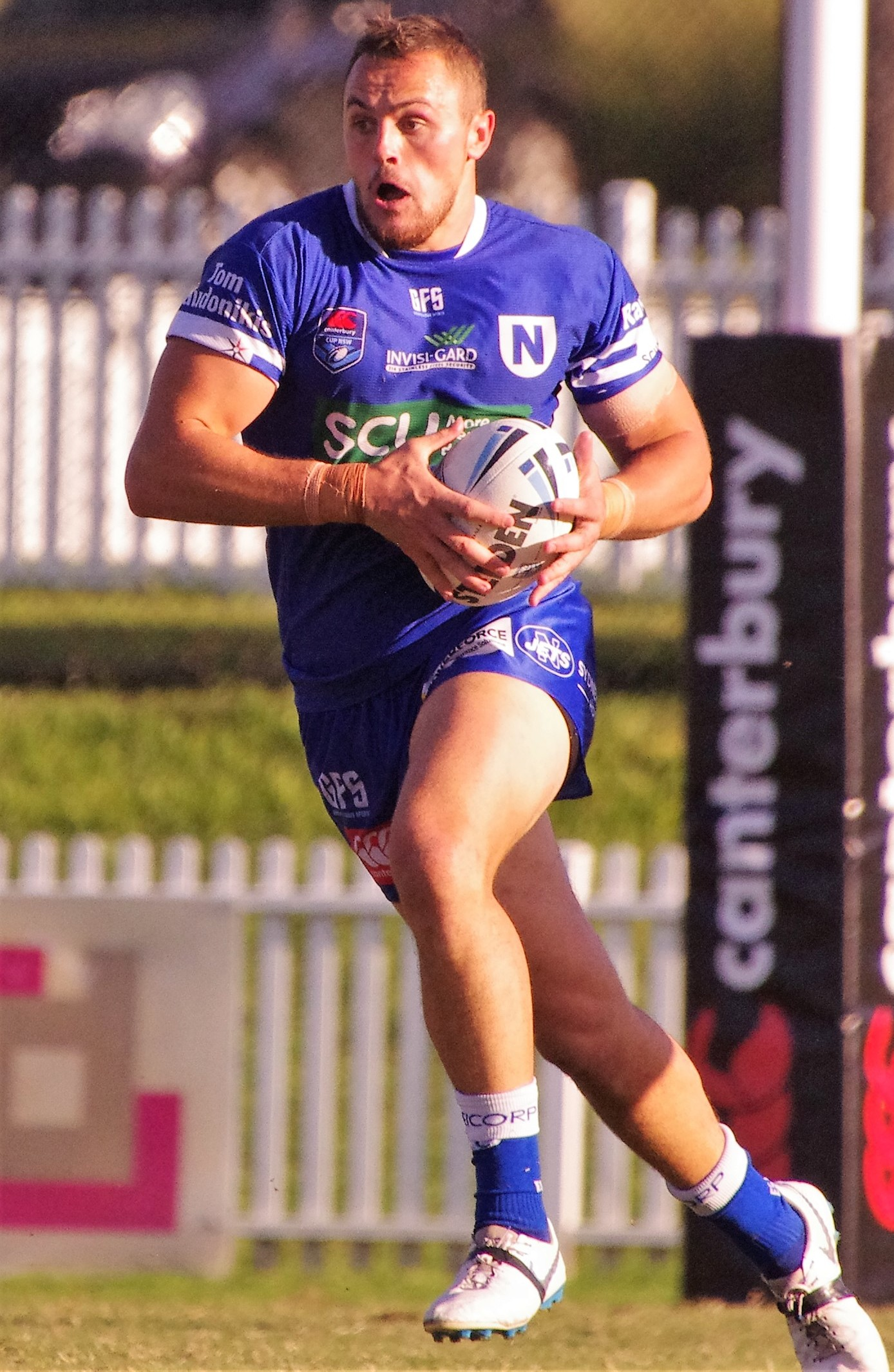

Personal information
- Full name: Jaimin Jolliffe
- Born: 7 November 1996 (age 29) Wagga Wagga, New South Wales, Australia
- Height: 187 cm (6 ft 2 in)
- Weight: 108 kg (17 st 0 lb)

Playing information
- Position: Prop
Club
Years	Team	Pld	T	G	FG	P
2020–26	Gold Coast Titans	102	6	0	0	24
2027–	Huddersfield Giants	0	0	0	0	0
	Total	102	6	0	0	24
Representative
Years	Team	Pld	T	G	FG	P
2022–	Ireland	2	0	0	0	0
- Source: As of 6 November 2026

Jaimin Jolliffe (born 7 November 1996) is an Ireland international rugby league footballer who plays as a prop forward for the Huddersfield Giants in the Super League.

== Early life ==
Jolliffe played his junior rugby league for Wagga Wagga Kangaroos. He is of Northern Irish descent through his Grandparents.

== Playing career ==
=== Gold Coast Titans ===
Jolliffe made his debut in round 1 of the 2020 NRL season for the Gold Coast against the Canberra Raiders starting from the bench. Jolliffe played all 25 matches for the Gold Coast in the 2021 NRL season including the club's elimination final loss against the Sydney Roosters. Jolliffe played 19 games for the Gold Coast in the 2022 NRL season as the club finished 13th on the table. Jolliffe was limited to only nine matches for the Gold Coast in the 2023 NRL season as the club finished 14th on the table. Jolliffe played 16 matches for the Gold Coast in the 2024 NRL season as the club finished 14th on the table. Jollife played 17 matches for the Gold Coast in the 2025 NRL season as the club narrowly avoided the wooden spoon finishing 16th. On 23 January 2026, the Titans announced that Jolillfe was ruled out of the entire 2026 season after tearing his ACL at training.

=== Huddersfield Giants ===
On 24 July 2026, it was announced that Joliffe would depart the Gold Coast Titans at the end of the season, he signed a three-year deal with the Huddersfield Giants.

== Statistics ==
Year	Team	Games	Tries	Pts
2020	Gold Coast Titans	16	0	0
2021	Gold Coast Titans	25	1	4
2022	Gold Coast Titans	19	2	8
2023	Gold Coast Titans	9	0	0
2024	Gold Coast Titans	16	2	8
2025	Gold Coast Titans	17	1	4
2026	Gold Coast Titans	0	0	0
2027	Huddersfield Giants	0	0	0
	Totals	102	6	24

*denotes season competing
