= Beau Fermor =

Australian rugby league footballer

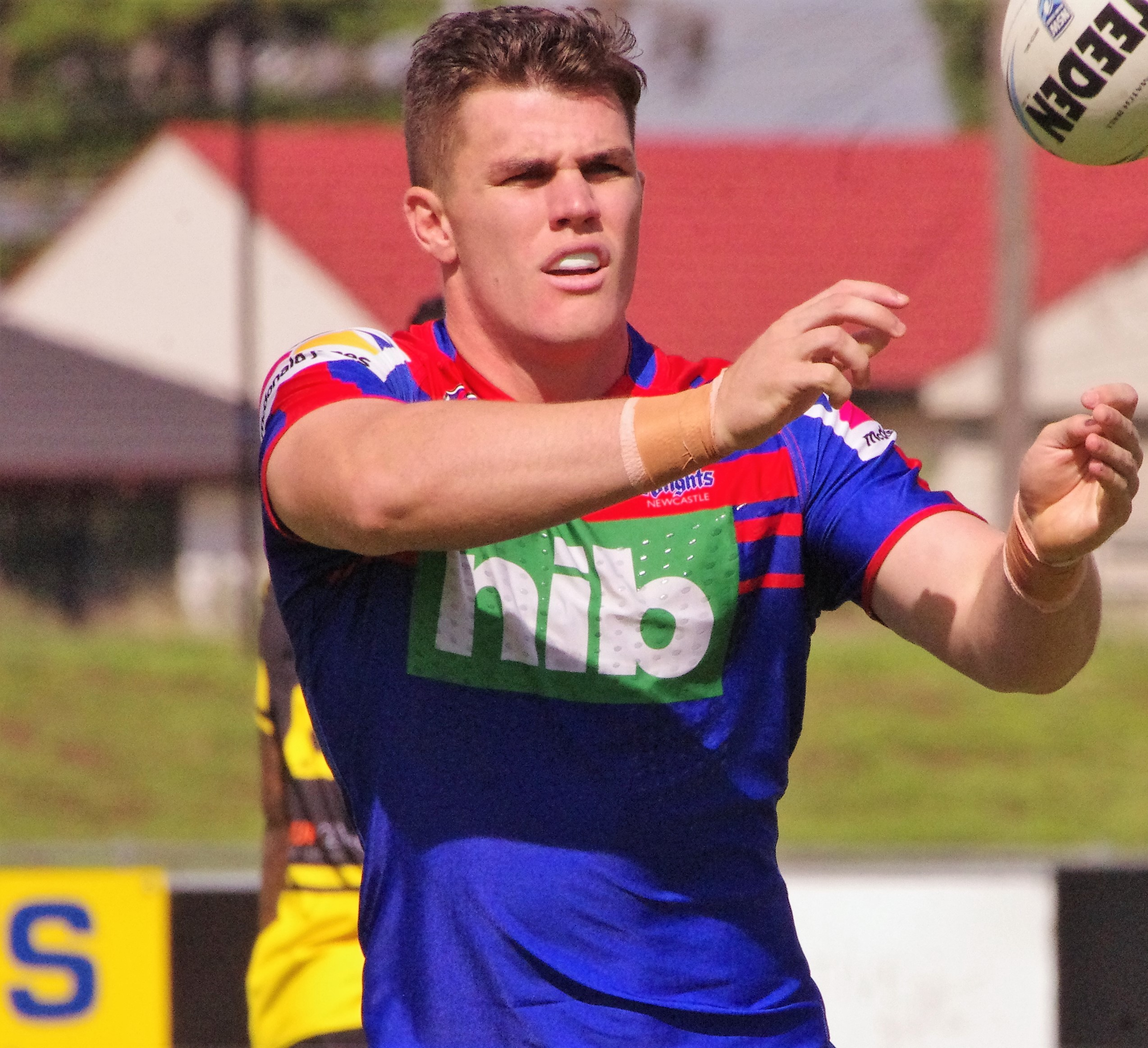

Personal information
- Born: 15 August 1998 (age 28) Dalby, Queensland, Australia
- Height: 189 cm (6 ft 2 in)
- Weight: 105 kg (16 st 7 lb)

Playing information
- Position: Second-row, Centre
Club
Years	Team	Pld	T	G	FG	P
2020–	Gold Coast Titans	115	36	1	0	146
Representative
Years	Team	Pld	T	G	FG	P
2019	NSW Residents	1	1	0	0	4
2022–24	Prime Minister's XIII	2	3	1	0	10
2025	Queensland	1	0	0	0	0
- Source: As of 4 September 2026

Beau Fermor (born 15 August 1998) is an Australian professional rugby league footballer who plays as a second-row forward for the Gold Coast Titans in the National Rugby League.

== Background ==
Born in Dalby, Queensland, Fermor played his junior rugby league for the Dalby Devils.

== Playing career ==
In 2014, Fermor played for the Toowoomba Clydesdales Cyril Connell Cup side, moving up to their Mal Meninga Cup side a year later before being signed by the Melbourne Storm. In 2016, he played for Melbourne's under-20 side, playing 27 games over two seasons, scoring 11 tries.

In 2018, Fermor signed with the Newcastle Knights, joining their Jersey Flegg Cup side. In July 2018, he represented the Queensland under-20 side in their win over New South Wales. At the end of the 2018 season, Fermor was named the Jersey Flegg Cup Player of the Year and signed a two-year extension with the Newcastle club. In 2019, he spent the season playing for the Knights' NSW Cup side.

=== 2020 ===
On 30 January, Fermor was granted a release by Newcastle and signed with the Gold Coast Titans on a three-year deal.

In Round 8 of the 2020 NRL season, Fermor made his NRL debut against the Cronulla-Sutherland Sharks, replacing the injured Kevin Proctor.

=== 2021 ===
Fermor played 15 games for the Gold Coast in the 2021 NRL season including the club's elimination final loss against the Sydney Roosters.

=== 2022 ===
In round 22 of the 2022 NRL season, Fermor scored two tries for the Gold Coast in a shock 44-24 victory over Manly which ended the clubs ten game losing streak and lifted them off the bottom of the table. Fermor finished the 2022 season playing 23 games as the club finished 13th on the table. Fermor finished as the clubs top try scorer with eleven tries.

=== 2023 ===
On 1 March it was announced that Fermor would miss the entire 2023 NRL season after rupturing his ACL at training.

=== 2024 ===
Fermor made 22 appearances for the Gold Coast throughout the 2024 NRL season as the club finished 14th on the table.

=== 2025 ===
In round 9 of the 2025 NRL season, Fermor scored two tries for the Gold Coast in their 38-18 loss against Canterbury. In May, Fermor was selected to represent Queensland in the 2025 State of Origin series, starting from the bench and made his début in Game 1 on 28 May, coming on in the 2nd half. He was subsequently dropped for Game 2. Fermor played 24 games for the Gold Coast in the 2025 NRL season as the club narrowly avoided the wooden spoon finishing 16th on the table. On 20 November, the Gold Coast Titans announced that Fermor had re-signed with the club until the end of 2029.

=== 2026 ===
Fermor playd almost every match for the Gold Coast in the 2026 NRL season as the club finished 16th on the table.

== Statistics ==
Year	Team	Games	Tries	Goals	Pts
2020	Gold Coast Titans	8	2		8
2021	Gold Coast Titans	15	4		16
2022	Gold Coast Titans	23	11		44
2024	Gold Coast Titans	22	5		20
2025	Gold Coast Titans	24	10	1	42
2026	Gold Coast Titans	22	4		16
	Totals	114	36	1	146

*denotes season competing
