= Sam McIntyre =

Australian rugby league footballer

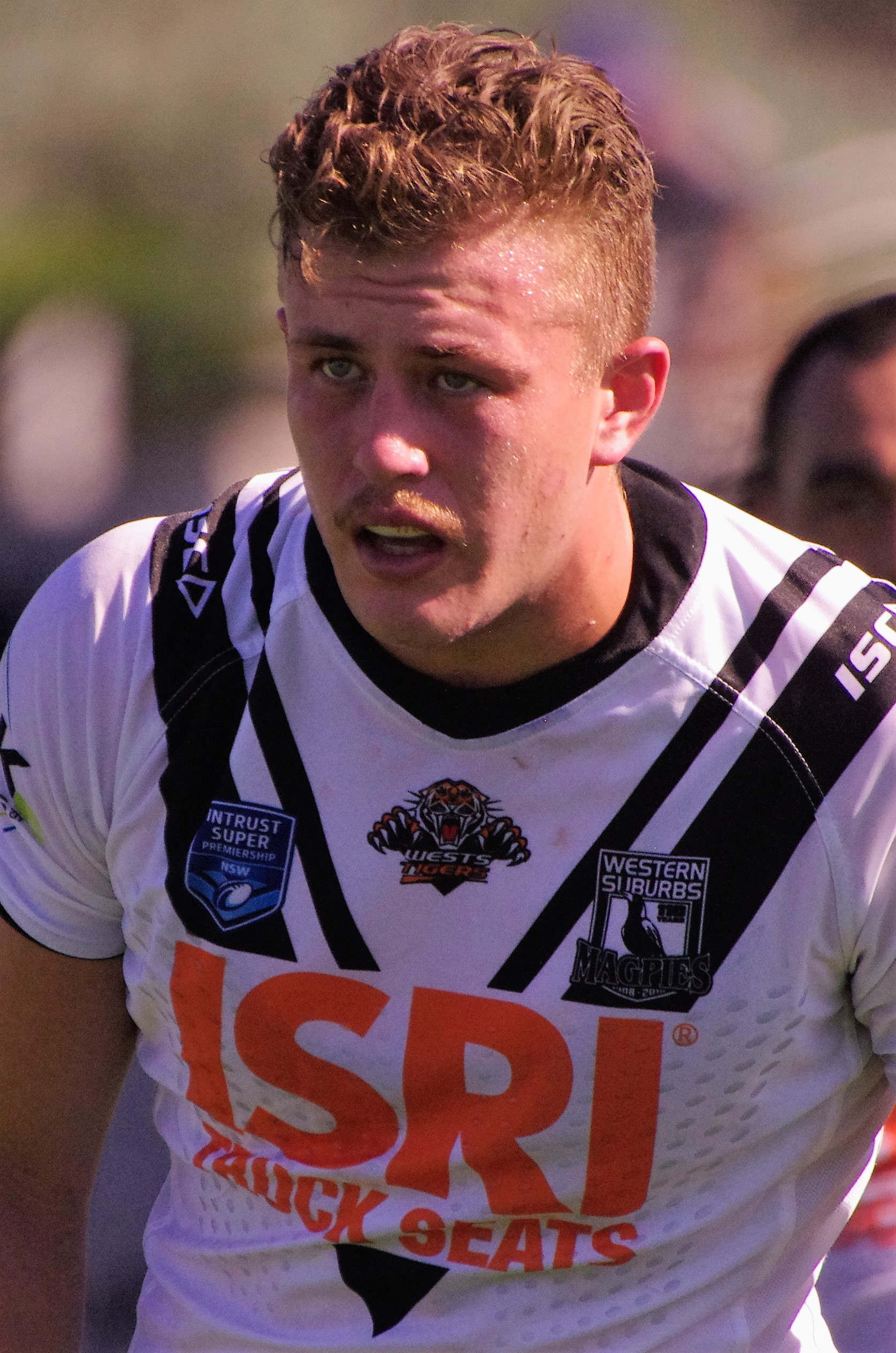

Personal information
- Full name: Samuel McIntyre
- Born: 20 March 1998 (age 28) Canberra, Australian Capital Territory, Australia
- Height: 190 cm (6 ft 3 in)
- Weight: 103 kg (16 st 3 lb)

Playing information
- Position: Second-row, Lock, Prop
Club
Years	Team	Pld	T	G	FG	P
2020	Wests Tigers	12	2	0	0	8
2021–23	Gold Coast Titans	25	1	0	0	4
2023–	North Qld Cowboys	60	5	0	0	20
2027-	New Zealand Warriors	0	0	0	0	0
	Total	97	8	0	0	32
Representative
Years	Team	Pld	T	G	FG	P
2024	Prime Minister's XIII	1	1	0	0	4
- Source: As of 12 September 2026

Sam McIntyre (born 20 March 1998) is an Australian professional rugby league footballer who plays as a second-row, lock, prop for the North Queensland Cowboys in the National Rugby League (NRL).

He previously played for the Wests Tigers and Gold Coast Titans in the NRL.

== Background ==
A Port Macquarie Sharks junior, McIntyre made his NRL Under-20s debut for the Newcastle Knights in March 2017. His "impressive first-up performance" saw him make 26 tackles and run for over 150 metres. Described as "A long-striding forward capable of breaking the line", he was "poached" by the Wests Tigers, joining them on a development contract for the 2018 season. He joined their full-time squad in 2019, playing 21 games for the feeder club the Western Suburbs Magpies, scoring 3 tries, making 600 tackles, and running for near 2000 metres.

== Playing career ==
McIntyre was named to make his debut on 20 June 2020. Coach Michael Maguire said, "Fans can expect to see someone who is tough, runs hard and does all the simple things really well. He’s a hard worker and that’s his character. He’ll get out there and do what he needs to for his teammates, he’s very selfless." With injuries to teammates Zane Musgrove and Alex Twal, McIntyre played a larger than expected 46 minutes, making 32 tackles, and running for 126 metres.

Remaining in the team for most of the rest of the year, McIntyre made 12 appearances, two in the starting team. He scored his first NRL try in round 10 in a record 48-0 "thrashing" of the Brisbane Broncos, and another in round 12. In November 2020, McIntyre signed a two-year deal with the Gold Coast Titans. McIntyre played a total of 13 games for the Gold Coast in the 2022 NRL season as the club finished 13th on the table.

On 16 May 2023, McIntyre joined the North Queensland Cowboys on a one-a-half-year contract. McIntyre made only two appearances for North Queensland in the 2023 NRL season as the club finished 11th on the table. McIntyre played 26 games for North Queensland in the 2024 NRL season as they finished 5th on the table. He played in both finals games for North Queensland as they were eliminated in the second week by Cronulla. McIntyre played 16 games for North Queensland in the 2025 NRL season as the club finished 12th on the table.

On 10 August 2026, the New Zealand Warriors announced that McIntyre would join the club from the 2027 NRL season. He signed a two-year contract with the Warriors, covering the 2027 and 2028 seasons. McIntyre joined the Warriors from the North Queensland Cowboys.

== Statistics ==
Year	Team	Games	Tries	Pts
2020	Wests Tigers	12	2	8
2021	Gold Coast Titans	10		
2022	Gold Coast Titans	13		
2023	Gold Coast Titans	2	1	4
2023	North Queensland Cowboys	2		
2024	North Queensland Cowboys	26	3	12
2025	North Queensland Cowboys	16	1	4
2026	North Queensland Cowboys	6	1	4
	Totals	88	8	32
