= Jai Whitbread =

Australian rugby league footballer

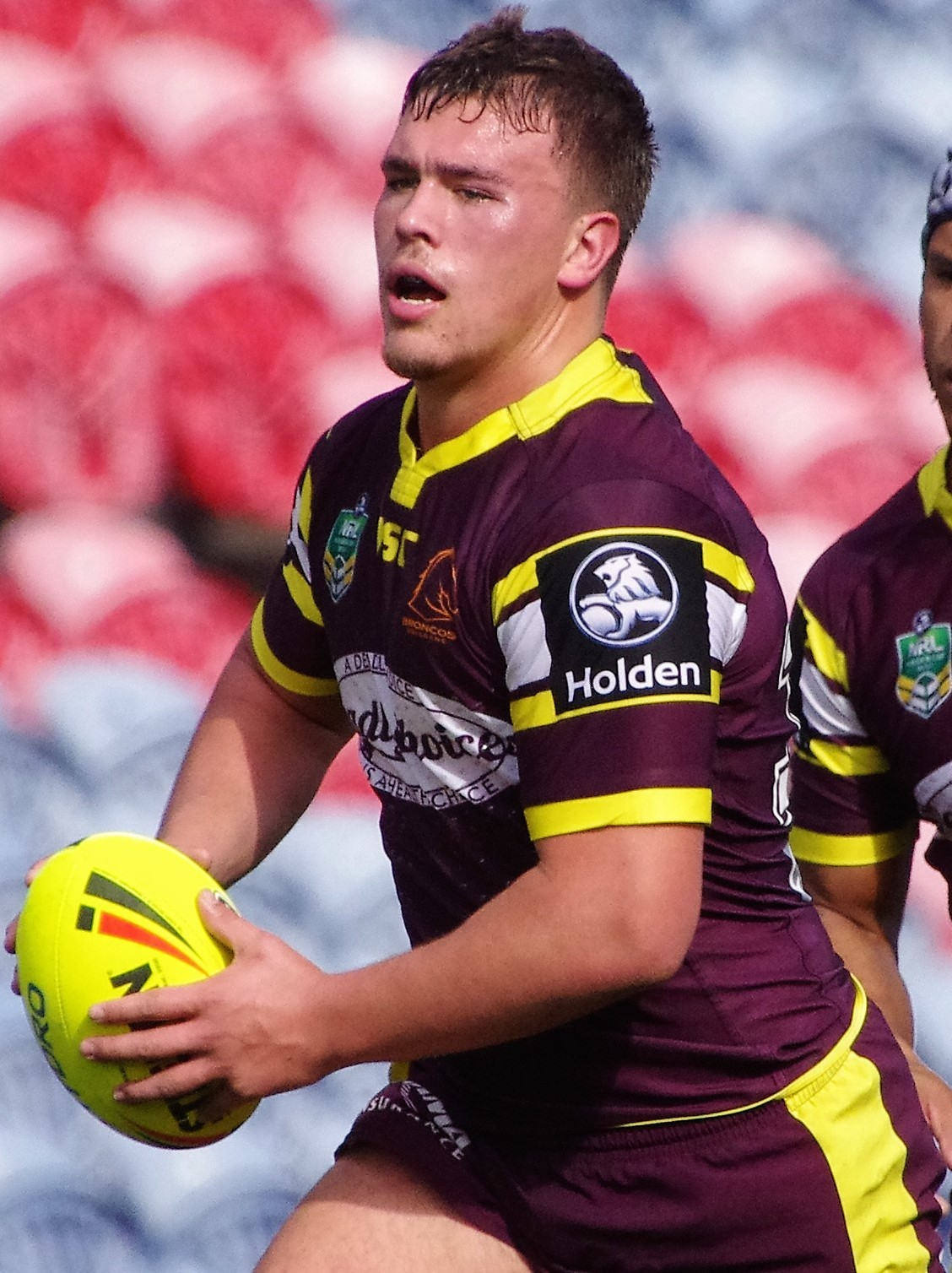

Personal information
- Born: 16 January 1998 (age 28) Tugun, Queensland, Australia
- Height: 6 ft 1 in (1.86 m)
- Weight: 16 st 12 lb (107 kg)

Playing information
- Position: Prop
Club
Years	Team	Pld	T	G	FG	P
2018–21	Gold Coast Titans	30	0	0	0	0
2021	Leigh Centurions	4	1	0	0	4
2022–23	Wakefield Trinity	39	4	0	0	16
2024–	Hull Kingston Rovers	90	18	0	0	72
	Total	163	23	0	0	92
- Source: As of 19 September 2026
- Father: Greg Whitbread

Jai Whitbread (born 16 January 1998) is an Australian professional rugby league footballer who plays as a prop and loose forward for Hull Kingston Rovers in the Super League.

He has previously played for the Gold Coast Titans in the NRL.

== Background ==
Whitbread was born in Tugun, Queensland, Australia and raised in Tweed Heads, New South Wales.

He played his junior rugby league for the South Tweed Bears. He attended Saint Joseph's College, Tweed Heads and The Southport School before being signed by the Gold Coast Titans. He is the son of former Canterbury Bulldogs and Gold Coast Giants/Seagulls player, Greg Whitbread.

== Playing career ==
=== Early career ===
In 2014, while a member of the Gold Coast Titans high performance squad, Whitbread represented the New South Wales Under-16 team. In 2016, he joined the Brisbane Broncos, playing for their Holden Cup (Under-20s) team and representing New South Wales Under-18s team.

=== 2018 ===
Whitbread began the season playing for the Burleigh Bears in the Queensland Cup.

In round 18 of the 2018 NRL season, Whitbread made his NRL debut for the Gold Coast against the Sydney Roosters. This would be Whitbread's only top grade appearance for the club in 2018. The Gold Coast would go on to finish in 14th position on the table at the end of the season.

=== 2019 ===
Whitbread made a total of 18 appearances for the Gold Coast in the 2019 NRL season as the club endured a horror year on and off the field. During the halfway mark of the season, head coach Garth Brennan was sacked by the club after a string of poor results. The Gold Coast managed to win only four games for the entire season and finished last claiming the Wooden Spoon.

=== 2020 ===
Whitbread played nine games for the Gold Coast in the 2020 NRL season as the club finished ninth on the table and missed the finals.

=== 2021 ===
On 2 August 2021, it was reported that he had signed for Leigh in the Super League. On 24 November 2021 it was reported that he had signed for Wakefield Trinity in the Super League.

=== 2023 ===
Whitbread played 16 games for Wakefield Trinity in the Super League XXVIII season as the club finished bottom of the table and were relegated to the RFL Championship which ended their 24-year stay in the top flight.

On 3 October 2023 it was reported that he had signed for Hull KR following the relegation of Wakefield Trinity.

=== 2024 ===
Whitbread made his club debut for Hull Kingston Rovers against arch-rivals Hull F.C. in round 1 of the 2024 Super League season. Hull Kingston Rovers would win the match 22-0. On 12 October, Whitbread played in Hull Kingston Rovers 2024 Super League Grand Final loss against Wigan.

=== 2025 ===
In round 3 of the 2025 Super League season, Whitbread scored two tries for Hull Kingston Rovers in their 42-0 win over Salford. On 7 June, Whitbread played in Hull Kingston Rovers 8-6 Challenge Cup final victory over Warrington. It was the clubs first major trophy in 40 years. On 18 September, Whitbread played in Hull Kingston Rovers victory over Warrington which saw the club win the League Leaders Shield in the last game of the regular season On 9 October, Whitbread played in Hull Kingston Rovers 2025 Super League Grand Final victory over Wigan.

=== 2026 ===
On 19 February, Whitbread played in Hull Kingston Rovers World Club Challenge victory against Brisbane.
