= Paul Turner (rugby league) =

New Zealand rugby league footballer

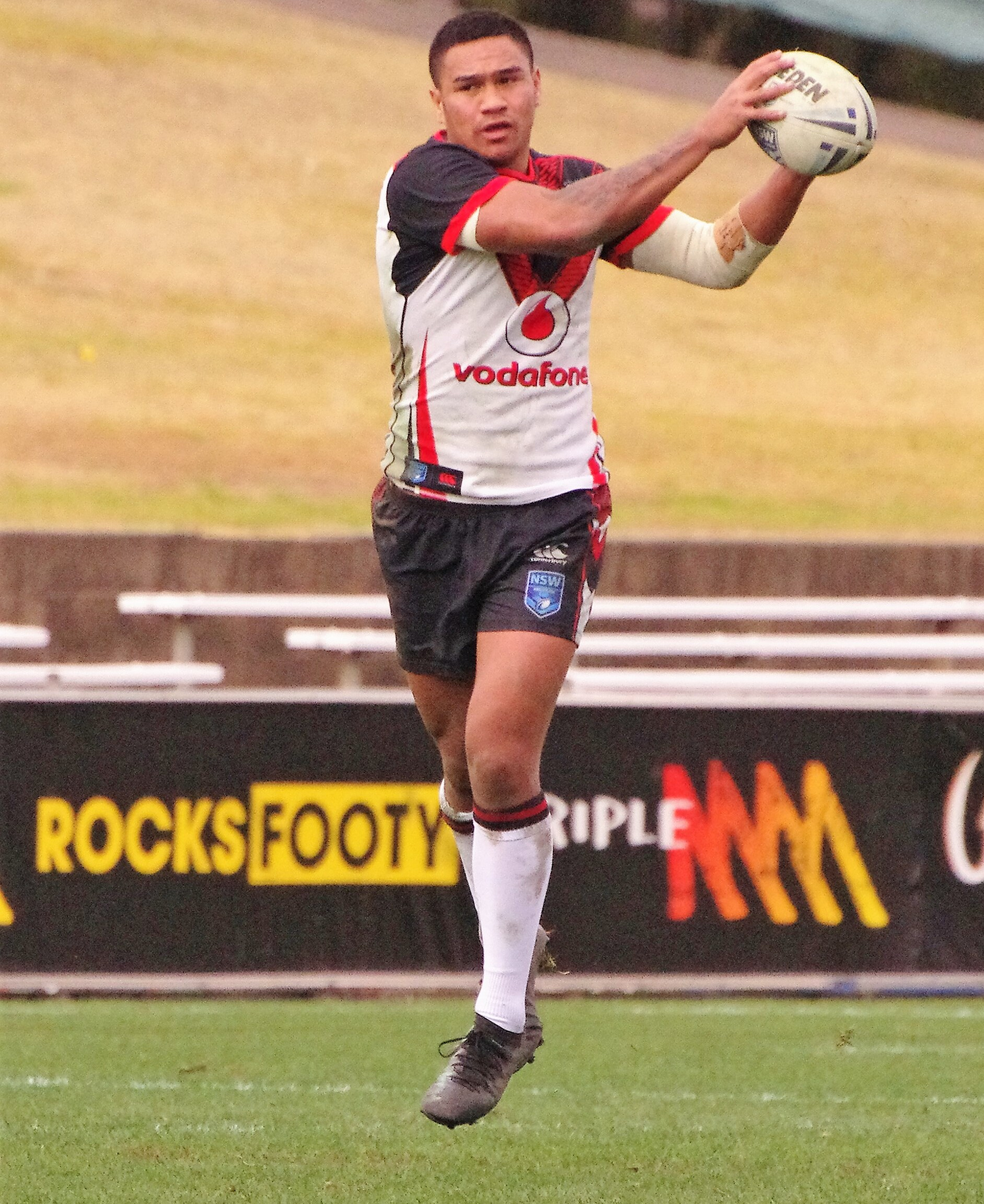

Personal information
- Full name: Paul Turner
- Born: 4 July 2000 (age 25) Whangārei, New Zealand
- Height: 180 cm (5 ft 11 in)
- Weight: 95 kg (14 st 13 lb)

Playing information
- Position: Five-eighth, Fullback, Halfback
Club
Years	Team	Pld	T	G	FG	P
2020–21	New Zealand Warriors	3	1	0	0	4
2022	Gold Coast Titans	7	1	0	0	4
2023	St. George Illawarra	1	0	0	0	0
2024	Featherstone Rovers	14	7	0	0	28
	Total	25	9	0	0	36
Representative
Years	Team	Pld	T	G	FG	P
2023	Māori All Stars	1	0	0	0	0
- Source: As of 7 June 2025

Paul Turner (born 4 July 2000) is a professional rugby league footballer who last played as a five-eighth or fullback for Featherstone Rovers in the RFL Championship.

He previously played for the Gold Coast Titans and the New Zealand Warriors in the NRL.

== Background ==
Turner played his junior rugby league for the Hikurangi Stags.

== Career ==
=== 2020 ===
Turner made his first grade debut in round 15 of the 2020 NRL season for the Warriors against the Canterbury-Bankstown Bulldogs.

=== 2022 ===
Turner joined the Gold Coast Titans in 2022. He made his Titans debut in his side's 30−16 loss to the South Sydney Rabbitohs at Robina Stadium in round 14 of the 2022 NRL season.

=== 2024 ===
On 6 Mar 2024 it was reported that he had signed for Featherstone Rovers in the RFL Championship
