= 2022 NRL season =

Australian rugby league season

2022 National Rugby League
- Duration: March 10 – October 2, 2022
- Teams: 16
- Premiers: Penrith Panthers (4th title)
- Minor premiers: Penrith Panthers (4th title)
- Matches played: 201
- Points scored: 8,724
- Average attendance: 16,248
- Attendance: 3,265,911
- Top points scorer: Valentine Holmes (244)
- Wooden spoon: Wests Tigers (1st spoon)
- Dally M Medal: Nicho Hynes
- Top try-scorer: Alex Johnston (30)

The 2022 NRL season was the 115th season of professional rugby league in Australia and the 25th season run by the National Rugby League.

== Teams ==
The lineup of teams remained unchanged for the 16th consecutive year. This became the second longest stretch of time (after 1947–1966, a span of 20 seasons) of a continuous line-up of teams in competition history (overtaking 15 seasons from 1967–1981).

| Colours | Club | Season | Home ground(s) | Head coach | Captain(s) |
|---|---|---|---|---|---|
| | Brisbane Broncos | 35th season | Suncorp Stadium | Kevin Walters | Adam Reynolds |
| | Canberra Raiders | 41st season | GIO Stadium Canberra | Ricky Stuart | Jarrod Croker & Elliott Whitehead |
| | Canterbury-Bankstown Bulldogs | 88th season | Accor Stadium & CommBank Stadium | ~~Trent Barrett~~ → Mick Potter (interim) | Josh Jackson |
| | Cronulla-Sutherland Sharks | 56th season | PointsBet Stadium | Craig Fitzgibbon | Wade Graham |
| | Gold Coast Titans | 16th season | Cbus Super Stadium | Justin Holbrook | Tino Fa'asuamaleaui |
| | Manly Warringah Sea Eagles | 73rd season | 4 Pines Park | Des Hasler | Daly Cherry-Evans |
| | Melbourne Storm | 25th season | AAMI Park | Craig Bellamy | Jesse Bromwich & Christian Welch |
| | Newcastle Knights | 35th season | McDonald Jones Stadium | Adam O'Brien | Jayden Brailey & Kalyn Ponga |
| | New Zealand Warriors | 28th season | Mt. Smart Stadium & Moreton Daily Stadium | ~~Nathan Brown~~ → Stacey Jones (interim) | Tohu Harris |
| | North Queensland Cowboys | 28th season | Queensland Country Bank Stadium | Todd Payten | Jason Taumalolo & Chad Townsend |
| | Parramatta Eels | 76th season | CommBank Stadium | Brad Arthur | Clint Gutherson & Junior Paulo |
| | Penrith Panthers | 56th season | BlueBet Stadium | Ivan Cleary | Isaah Yeo & Nathan Cleary |
| | South Sydney Rabbitohs | 113th season | Accor Stadium | Jason Demetriou | Cameron Murray |
| | St. George Illawarra Dragons | 24th season | Netstrata Jubilee Stadium & WIN Stadium | Anthony Griffin | Ben Hunt |
| | Sydney Roosters | 115th season | Sydney Cricket Ground & Allianz Stadium | Trent Robinson | James Tedesco |
| | Wests Tigers | 23rd season | Leichhardt Oval, Campbelltown Stadium & CommBank Stadium | ~~Michael Maguire~~ → Brett Kimmorley (interim) | James Tamou, Luke Brooks, Adam Doueihi, Ken Maumalo & Tyrone Peachey |

== Pre-season ==
The 2022 pre-season for NRL teams featured nineteen matches across three weekends, including the 2022 All Stars match and the annual Charity Shield match between the South Sydney Rabbitohs and St George Illawarra Dragons.

The pre-season also saw the first ever rugby league match to be played in the western Victorian city of Ballarat when Melbourne Storm played the Newcastle Knights at Eureka Stadium in front of 5,127 people. The Charity Shield match also drew the highest attendance for the fixture since 2017, and aside from the All Stars match, was the largest attended match of the pre-season with 9,257 fans.

The match between the New Zealand Warriors and the Gold Coast Titans was cancelled after being initially postponed and rescheduled from Moreton Daily Stadium to Cbus Super Stadium due to the 2022 South East Queensland flood.

=== All Stars match ===
12 February 2022
20:20 AEST (UTC+11:00)

| Māori All Stars (Māori people) | 16–10 | Indigenous All Stars |
|---|---|---|
| | Report |

Western Sydney Stadium, Sydney
Attendance: 26,755

=== Trials ===
Italics indicates a non-NRL club.

| Date | Time | Home | Score | Away | Stadium | Attendance | Report |
|---|---|---|---|---|---|---|---|
| 12 February 2022 | 16:00 AEST (UTC+10:00) | Wynnum Manly Seagulls | 4–52 | Brisbane Broncos | Kougari Oval, Brisbane | 5,000 | Report |
| 18 February 2022 | 18:00 AEDT (UTC+11:00) | Sydney Roosters | 18–32 | Canberra Raiders | Leichhardt Oval, Sydney | 5,563 | Report |
| 18 February 2022 | 20:00 AEDT (UTC+11:00) | Wests Tigers | 4–28 | Manly-Warringah Sea Eagles | Leichhardt Oval, Sydney | 5,563 | Report |
| 19 February 2022 | 16:00 AEDT (UTC+11:00) | Melbourne Storm | 16–30 | New Zealand Warriors | Casey Fields, Melbourne | 6,876 | Report |
| 19 February 2022 | 17:00 AEST (UTC+10:00) | North Queensland Cowboys | 24–12 | South Sydney Rabbitohs | Barlow Park, Cairns | 7,128 | Report |
| 19 February 2022 | 19:00 AEST (UTC+10:00) | Gold Coast Titans | 26–26 | Brisbane Broncos | Robina Stadium, Gold Coast | 4,919 | Report |
| 20 February 2022 | 16:00 AEDT (UTC+11:00) | Penrith Panthers | 34–6 | Cronulla-Sutherland Sharks | Western Sydney Stadium, Sydney | TBA | Report |
| 20 February 2022 | 18:00 AEDT (UTC+11:00) | Parramatta Eels | 22–26 | St George Illawarra Dragons | Western Sydney Stadium, Sydney | TBA | Report |
| 21 February 2022 | 19:00 AEDT (UTC+11:00) | Newcastle Knights | 16–16 | Canterbury-Bankstown Bulldogs | Newcastle International Sports Centre, Newcastle | 5,288 | Report |
| 25 February 2022 | 18:00 AEDT (UTC+11:00) | Manly-Warringah Sea Eagles | 16–18 | Canberra Raiders | Central Coast Stadium, Gosford | 5,601 | Report |
| 25 February 2022 | 20:00 AEDT (UTC+11:00) | Sydney Roosters | 8–16 | Wests Tigers | Central Coast Stadium, Gosford | 5,601 | Report |
| 26 February 2022 | 17:00 AEDT (UTC+11:00) | Penrith Panthers | 0–36 | Parramatta Eels | Penrith Stadium, Sydney | TBA | Report |
| 26 February 2022 | 19:00 AEDT (UTC+11:00) | South Sydney Rabbitohs | 10–16 | St George Illawarra Dragons | Glen Willow Regional Sports Stadium, Mudgee | 9,257 | Report |
| 26 February 2022 | 20:00 AEST (UTC+10:00) | North Queensland Cowboys | 26–6 | Brisbane Broncos | Stadium Mackay, Mackay | 4,545 | Report |
| 27 February 2022 | 17:45 AEDT (UTC+11:00) | Melbourne Storm | 24–10 | Newcastle Knights | Eureka Stadium, Ballarat | 5,127 | Report |
| 28 February 2022 | 19:00 AEDT (UTC+11:00) | Cronulla-Sutherland Sharks | 30–6 | Canterbury-Bankstown Bulldogs | Endeavour Field, Sydney | TBA | Report |
| 28 February 2022 | 20:00 AEST (UTC+10:00) | New Zealand Warriors | C–C | Gold Coast Titans | Robina Stadium, Gold Coast^{a} | N/A | Source |

^{a} The match was initially scheduled to be played on 26 February at Moreton Daily Stadium, but was rescheduled due to the 2022 South East Queensland flood.

== Regular season ==
| Team | 1 | 2 | 3 | 4 | 5 | 6 | 7 | 8 | 9 | 10 | 11 | 12 | 13 | 14 | 15 | 16 | 17 | 18 | 19 | 20 | 21 | 22 | 23 | 24 | 25 | F1 | F2 | F3 | GF |
|---|---|---|---|---|---|---|---|---|---|---|---|---|---|---|---|---|---|---|---|---|---|---|---|---|---|---|---|---|---|
| Brisbane Broncos | **SOU** **+7** | CBY +6 | **NQL** **−26** | NZL −14 | **SYD** **−4** | PEN −28 | **CBY** **+20** | **CRO** **+9** | SOU +20 | MAN +38 | NEW +24 | **GCT** **+11** | X | **CAN** **+6** | MEL −12 | NQL −14 | **SGI** **+14** | GCT +4 | PAR +22 | **WTI** **−14** | SYD −18 | **NEW** **+18** | **MEL** **−48** | **PAR** **−47** | SGI −10 | | | | |
| Canberra Raiders | **CRO** **+5** | NQL −20 | **GCT** **+2** | MAN −19 | **MEL** **−14** | **NQL** **−6** | PEN −30 | NZL −1* | **CBY** **+10** | CRO +20 | SOU +20 | **PAR** **−8** | **SYD** **+6** | BRI −6 | **NEW** **+2** | SGI −2 | X | MEL +4 | **NZL** **+12** | GCT +12 | **PEN** **−20** | **SGI** **+2** | NEW +6 | **MAN** **+42** | WTI +46 | MEL +8 | PAR −36 | | |
| Canterbury-Bankstown Bulldogs | NQL +2 | **BRI** **−6** | MAN −1 | MEL −44 | **PEN** **−20** | SOU −20 | BRI −20 | **SYD** **+4** | CAN −10 | **NEW** **−10** | WTI −14 | **SGI** **−10** | PEN −12 | **PAR** **+30** | **WTI** **+24** | **CRO** **−12** | X | **SOU** **−8** | **GCT** **+10** | NEW +14 | **NQL** **−14** | NZL −24 | PAR −36 | CRO −16 | **MAN** **+1** | | | | |
| Cronulla-Sutherland Sharks | CAN −5 | **PAR** **+2** | SGI +24 | **NEW** **+18** | **WTI** **+26** | MEL −16 | **MAN** **+12** | BRI −9 | **NZL** **+19** | **CAN** **−20** | GCT +7 | **SYD** **−20** | X | NZL +22 | **GCT** **+8** | CBY +12 | **MEL** **+22** | NQL +14 | PEN −10 | **SOU** **+1*** | **SGI** **+6** | WTI +24 | MAN +34 | **CBY** **+16** | NEW +22 | **NQL** **−2*** | **SOU** **−26** | | |
| Gold Coast Titans | PAR −4 | **NZL** **+2** | CAN −2 | **WTI** **+2** | **PAR** **−6** | MAN −8 | NQL −26 | **PEN** **−14** | SYD −28 | **SGI** **+4*** | **CRO** **−7** | BRI −11 | **NQL** **−26** | **SOU** **−14** | CRO −8 | NEW −26 | X | **BRI** **−4** | CBY −10 | **CAN** **−12** | MEL −18 | **MAN** **+20** | SGI −20 | **NEW** **+10** | NZL +1* | | | | |
| Manly Warringah Sea Eagles | PEN −22 | SYD −14 | **CBY** **+1** | **CAN** **+19** | NEW +24 | **GCT** **+8** | CRO −12 | SOU −18 | **WTI** **+14** | **BRI** **−38** | PAR −2 | MEL −20 | **NZL** **+32** | WTI +26 | **NQL** **−2** | **MEL** **+6** | X | **NEW** **+30** | SGI −14 | **SYD** **−10** | **PAR** **−16** | GCT −20 | **CRO** **−34** | CAN −42 | CBY −1 | | | | |
| Melbourne Storm | WTI +10 | **SOU** **+1*** | **PAR** **−4*** | **CBY** **+44** | CAN +14 | **CRO** **+16** | **NZL** **+60** | NEW +48 | **SGI** **+36** | **PEN** **−26** | NQL −30 | **MAN** **+20** | X | SYD +8 | **BRI** **+12** | MAN −6 | CRO −22 | **CAN** **−4** | SOU −12 | NZL +12 | **GCT** **+18** | PEN +16 | BRI +48 | **SYD** **−4** | PAR −8 | **CAN** **−8** | | | |
| New Zealand Warriors | **SGI** **−12** | GCT −2 | WTI +4 | **BRI** **+14** | **NQL** **+1*** | SYD −8 | MEL −60 | **CAN** **+1*** | CRO −19 | **SOU** **−2** | SGI −6 | **NEW** **−8** | MAN −32 | **CRO** **−22** | **PEN** **−34** | **WTI** **+20** | X | PAR −10 | CAN −12 | **MEL** **−12** | SOU −38 | **CBY** **+24** | NQL −44 | PEN −34 | **GCT** **−1*** | | | | |
| Newcastle Knights | SYD +14 | **WTI** **+22** | PEN −18 | CRO −18 | **MAN** **−24** | SGI −5 | **PAR** **−37** | **MEL** **−48** | NQL −20 | CBY +10 | **BRI** **−24** | NZL +8 | X | **PEN** **−36** | CAN −2 | **GCT** **+26** | **SOU** **−12** | MAN −30 | **SYD** **−30** | **CBY** **−14** | WTI +4 | BRI −18 | **CAN** **−6** | GCT −10 | **CRO** **−22** | | | | |
| North Queensland Cowboys | **CBY** **−2** | **CAN** **+20** | BRI +26 | **SYD** **−24** | NZL −1* | CAN +6 | **GCT** **+26** | PAR +31 | **NEW** **+20** | WTI +24 | **MEL** **+30** | PEN −22 | GCT +26 | **SGI** **+19** | MAN +2 | **BRI** **+14** | X | **CRO** **−14** | **WTI** **+1** | SGI +26 | CBY +14 | SYD −14 | **NZL** **+44** | SOU −10 | **PEN** **+30** | CRO +2* | X | **PAR** **−4** | |
| Parramatta Eels | **GCT** **+4** | CRO −2 | MEL +4* | **SGI** **+34** | GCT +6 | **WTI** **−1** | NEW +37 | **NQL** **−31** | PEN +2 | SYD −7 | **MAN** **+2** | CAN +8 | X | CBY −30 | **SYD** **+10** | SOU −18 | WTI +8 | **NZL** **+10** | **BRI** **−22** | **PEN** **+24** | MAN +16 | **SOU** **−26** | **CBY** **+36** | BRI +47 | **MEL** **+8** | PEN −19 | **CAN** **+36** | NQL +4 | PEN −16 |
| Penrith Panthers | **MAN** **+22** | SGI +4 | **NEW** **+18** | **SOU** **+14** | CBY +20 | **BRI** **+28** | **CAN** **+30** | GCT +14 | **PAR** **−2** | MEL +26 | SYD +20 | **NQL** **+22** | **CBY** **+12** | NEW +36 | NZL +34 | **SYD** **+8** | X | WTI +2 | **CRO** **+10** | PAR −24 | CAN +20 | **MEL** **−16** | SOU +4 | **NZL** **+34** | NQL −30 | **PAR** **+19** | X | **SOU** **+20** | **PAR** **+16** |
| South Sydney Rabbitohs | BRI −7 | MEL −1* | **SYD** **+12** | PEN −14 | **SGI** **+12** | **CBY** **+20** | WTI −1 | **MAN** **+18** | **BRI** **−20** | NZL +2 | **CAN** **−20** | **WTI** **+26** | X | GCT +14 | SGI −20 | **PAR** **+18** | NEW +12 | CBY +8 | **MEL** **+12** | CRO −1* | **NZL** **+38** | PAR +26 | **PEN** **−4** | **NQL** **+10** | SYD −10 | SYD +16 | CRO +26 | PEN −20 | |
| St. George Illawarra Dragons | NZL +12 | **PEN** **−4** | **CRO** **−24** | PAR −34 | SOU −12 | **NEW** **+5** | **SYD** **+2** | **WTI** **+6** | MEL −36 | GCT −4* | **NZL** **+6** | CBY +10 | X | NQL −19 | **SOU** **+20** | **CAN** **+2** | BRI −14 | SYD −28 | **MAN** **+14** | **NQL** **−26** | CRO −6 | CAN −2 | **GCT** **+20** | WTI +2 | **BRI** **+10** | | | | |
| Sydney Roosters | **NEW** **−14** | **MAN** **+14** | SOU −12 | NQL +24 | BRI +4 | **NZL** **+8** | SGI −2 | CBY −4 | **GCT** **+28** | **PAR** **+7** | **PEN** **−20** | CRO +20 | CAN −6 | **MEL** **−8** | PAR −10 | PEN −8 | X | **SGI** **+28** | NEW +30 | MAN +10 | **BRI** **+18** | **NQL** **+14** | **WTI** **+66** | MEL +4 | **SOU** **+10** | **SOU** **−16** | | | |
| Wests Tigers | **MEL** **−10** | NEW −22 | **NZL** **−4** | GCT −2 | CRO −26 | PAR +1 | **SOU** **+1** | SGI −6 | MAN −14 | **NQL** **−24** | **CBY** **+14** | SOU −26 | X | **MAN** **−26** | CBY −24 | NZL −20 | **PAR** **−8** | **PEN** **−2** | NQL −1 | BRI +14 | **NEW** **−4** | **CRO** **−24** | SYD −66 | **SGI** **−2** | **CAN** **−46** | | | | |
| Team | 1 | 2 | 3 | 4 | 5 | 6 | 7 | 8 | 9 | 10 | 11 | 12 | 13 | 14 | 15 | 16 | 17 | 18 | 19 | 20 | 21 | 22 | 23 | 24 | 25 | F1 | F2 | F3 | GF |

Bold – Home game
X – Bye
* – Golden point game
Opponent for round listed above margin

== Ladder ==
2022 NRL season
| Pos | Team | Pld | W | D | L | B | PF | PA | PD | Pts |
|---|---|---|---|---|---|---|---|---|---|---|
| 1 | Penrith Panthers (P) | 24 | 20 | 0 | 4 | 1 | 636 | 330 | +306 | 42 |
| 2 | Cronulla-Sutherland Sharks | 24 | 18 | 0 | 6 | 1 | 573 | 364 | +209 | 38 |
| 3 | North Queensland Cowboys | 24 | 17 | 0 | 7 | 1 | 633 | 361 | +272 | 36 |
| 4 | Parramatta Eels | 24 | 16 | 0 | 8 | 1 | 608 | 489 | +119 | 34 |
| 5 | Melbourne Storm | 24 | 15 | 0 | 9 | 1 | 657 | 410 | +247 | 32 |
| 6 | Sydney Roosters | 24 | 15 | 0 | 9 | 1 | 635 | 434 | +201 | 32 |
| 7 | South Sydney Rabbitohs | 24 | 14 | 0 | 10 | 1 | 604 | 474 | +130 | 30 |
| 8 | Canberra Raiders | 24 | 14 | 0 | 10 | 1 | 524 | 461 | +63 | 30 |
| 9 | Brisbane Broncos | 24 | 13 | 0 | 11 | 1 | 514 | 550 | −36 | 28 |
| 10 | St. George Illawarra Dragons | 24 | 12 | 0 | 12 | 1 | 469 | 569 | −100 | 26 |
| 11 | Manly Warringah Sea Eagles | 24 | 9 | 0 | 15 | 1 | 490 | 595 | −105 | 20 |
| 12 | Canterbury-Bankstown Bulldogs | 24 | 7 | 0 | 17 | 1 | 383 | 575 | −192 | 16 |
| 13 | Gold Coast Titans | 24 | 6 | 0 | 18 | 1 | 455 | 660 | −205 | 14 |
| 14 | Newcastle Knights | 24 | 6 | 0 | 18 | 1 | 372 | 662 | −290 | 14 |
| 15 | New Zealand Warriors | 24 | 6 | 0 | 18 | 1 | 408 | 700 | −292 | 14 |
| 16 | Wests Tigers | 24 | 4 | 0 | 20 | 1 | 352 | 679 | −327 | 10 |

=== Ladder progression ===
- Numbers highlighted in green indicate that the team finished the round inside the top eight.
- Numbers highlighted in blue indicate the team finished first on the ladder in that round.
- Numbers highlighted in red indicate the team finished last place on the ladder in that round.
- Underlined numbers indicate that the team had a bye during that round.

| | Team | 1 | 2 | 3 | 4 | 5 | 6 | 7 | 8 | 9 | 10 | 11 | 12 | 13 | 14 | 15 | 16 | 17 | 18 | 19 | 20 | 21 | 22 | 23 | 24 | 25 |
|---|---|---|---|---|---|---|---|---|---|---|---|---|---|---|---|---|---|---|---|---|---|---|---|---|---|---|
| 1 | Penrith Panthers | 2 | 4 | 6 | 8 | 10 | 12 | 14 | 16 | 16 | 18 | 20 | 22 | 24 | 26 | 28 | 30 | 32 | 34 | 36 | 36 | 38 | 38 | 40 | 42 | 42 |
| 2 | Cronulla-Sutherland Sharks | 0 | 2 | 4 | 6 | 8 | 8 | 10 | 10 | 12 | 12 | 14 | 14 | 16 | 18 | 20 | 22 | 24 | 26 | 26 | 28 | 30 | 32 | 34 | 36 | 38 |
| 3 | North Queensland Cowboys | 0 | 2 | 4 | 4 | 4 | 6 | 8 | 10 | 12 | 14 | 16 | 16 | 18 | 20 | 22 | 24 | 26 | 26 | 28 | 30 | 32 | 32 | 34 | 34 | 36 |
| 4 | Parramatta Eels | 2 | 2 | 4 | 6 | 8 | 8 | 10 | 10 | 12 | 12 | 14 | 16 | 18 | 18 | 20 | 20 | 22 | 24 | 24 | 26 | 28 | 28 | 30 | 32 | 34 |
| 5 | Melbourne Storm | 2 | 4 | 4 | 6 | 8 | 10 | 12 | 14 | 16 | 16 | 16 | 18 | 20 | 22 | 24 | 24 | 24 | 24 | 24 | 26 | 28 | 30 | 32 | 32 | 32 |
| 6 | Sydney Roosters | 0 | 2 | 2 | 4 | 6 | 8 | 8 | 8 | 10 | 12 | 12 | 14 | 14 | 14 | 14 | 14 | 16 | 18 | 20 | 22 | 24 | 26 | 28 | 30 | 32 |
| 7 | South Sydney Rabbitohs | 0 | 0 | 2 | 2 | 4 | 6 | 6 | 8 | 8 | 10 | 10 | 12 | 14 | 16 | 16 | 18 | 20 | 22 | 24 | 24 | 26 | 28 | 28 | 30 | 30 |
| 8 | Canberra Raiders | 2 | 2 | 4 | 4 | 4 | 4 | 4 | 4 | 6 | 8 | 10 | 10 | 12 | 12 | 14 | 14 | 16 | 18 | 20 | 22 | 22 | 24 | 26 | 28 | 30 |
| 9 | Brisbane Broncos | 2 | 4 | 4 | 4 | 4 | 4 | 6 | 8 | 10 | 12 | 14 | 16 | 18 | 20 | 20 | 20 | 22 | 24 | 26 | 26 | 26 | 28 | 28 | 28 | 28 |
| 10 | St. George Illawarra Dragons | 2 | 2 | 2 | 2 | 2 | 4 | 6 | 8 | 8 | 8 | 10 | 12 | 14 | 14 | 16 | 18 | 18 | 18 | 20 | 20 | 20 | 20 | 22 | 24 | 26 |
| 11 | Manly Warringah Sea Eagles | 0 | 0 | 2 | 4 | 6 | 8 | 8 | 8 | 10 | 10 | 10 | 10 | 12 | 14 | 14 | 16 | 18 | 20 | 20 | 20 | 20 | 20 | 20 | 20 | 20 |
| 12 | Canterbury-Bankstown Bulldogs | 2 | 2 | 2 | 2 | 2 | 2 | 2 | 4 | 4 | 4 | 4 | 4 | 4 | 6 | 8 | 8 | 10 | 10 | 12 | 14 | 14 | 14 | 14 | 14 | 16 |
| 13 | Gold Coast Titans | 0 | 2 | 2 | 4 | 4 | 4 | 4 | 4 | 4 | 6 | 6 | 6 | 6 | 6 | 6 | 6 | 8 | 8 | 8 | 8 | 8 | 10 | 10 | 12 | 14 |
| 14 | Newcastle Knights | 2 | 4 | 4 | 4 | 4 | 4 | 4 | 4 | 4 | 6 | 6 | 8 | 10 | 10 | 10 | 12 | 12 | 12 | 12 | 12 | 14 | 14 | 14 | 14 | 14 |
| 15 | New Zealand Warriors | 0 | 0 | 2 | 4 | 6 | 6 | 6 | 8 | 8 | 8 | 8 | 8 | 8 | 8 | 8 | 10 | 12 | 12 | 12 | 12 | 12 | 14 | 14 | 14 | 14 |
| 16 | Wests Tigers | 0 | 0 | 0 | 0 | 0 | 2 | 4 | 4 | 4 | 4 | 6 | 6 | 8 | 8 | 8 | 8 | 8 | 8 | 8 | 10 | 10 | 10 | 10 | 10 | 10 |

== Finals series ==
| Home | Score | Away | Match Information |
| Home | Score | Away | Date and time (local) | Venue | Referee | Crowd |
|---|---|---|---|---|---|---|
Qualifying & elimination finals
| Penrith Panthers | 27–8 | Parramatta Eels | 9 September 2022, 7:55pm | BlueBet Stadium | Gerard Sutton | 21,863 |
| Melbourne Storm | 20–28 | Canberra Raiders | 10 September 2022, 5:45pm | AAMI Park | Grant Atkins | 20,838 |
| Cronulla-Sutherland Sharks | 30–32* | North Queensland Cowboys † | 10 September 2022, 7:55pm | PointsBet Stadium | Adam Gee | 12,447 |
| Sydney Roosters | 14–30 | South Sydney Rabbitohs | 11 September 2022, 4:05pm | Allianz Stadium | Ashley Klein | 39,816 |
Semi-finals
| Parramatta Eels | 40–4 | Canberra Raiders | 16 September 2022, 7:50pm | CommBank Stadium | Ashley Klein | 29,134 |
| Cronulla-Sutherland Sharks | 12–38 | South Sydney Rabbitohs | 17 September 2022, 8:00pm | Allianz Stadium | Grant Atkins | 39,733 |
Preliminary finals
| North Queensland Cowboys | 20–24 | Parramatta Eels | 23 September 2022, 7:50pm | Queensland Country Bank Stadium | Grant Atkins | 25,372 |
| Penrith Panthers | 32–12 | South Sydney Rabbitohs | 24 September 2022, 7:50pm | Accor Stadium | Ashley Klein | 50,034 |

* Match decided in golden point extra time.

=== Chart ===
Qualifying and elimination finals
9 Sept, BlueBet Stadium
1 | Penrith | 27
4 | Parramatta | 8
10 Sept, AAMI Park
5 | Melbourne | 20
8 | Canberra | 28
11 Sept, Allianz Stadium
6 | Sydney | 14
7 | South Sydney | 30
10 Sept, PointsBet Stadium
2 | Cronulla-Sutherland | 30
3 | North Queensland | 32

Semi-finals
16 Sept, CommBank Stadium
Parramatta | 40
Canberra | 4
17 Sept, Allianz Stadium
Cronulla-Sutherland | 12
South Sydney | 38

Preliminary finals
24 Sept, Accor Stadium
Penrith | 32
South Sydney | 12
23 Sept, QCB Stadium
North Queensland | 20
Parramatta | 24

Grand final
2 Oct, Accor Stadium
Penrith | 28
Parramatta | 12

== Grand final ==
2022 NRL Grand Final

Sunday, 2 October
19:35 AEDT (UTC+11)

| Penrith Panthers | 28 – 12 | Parramatta Eels |
|---|---|---|
| Tries: 5 To'o 18', 46'; Crichton 11'; Sorensen 28'; Staines 59'; Goals: 4 Cleary 13', pen 22', 29', 61' (4/6) | 1st: 18–0; 2nd: 10–12; Report | Tries: 2 Gutherson 77'; Arthur 78'; Goals: 2 Moses 77', 79' (2/2) |

Accor Stadium, Sydney
Attendance: 82,415
Referee: Ashley Klein
Bunker: Grant Atkins
Touch judges: Phil Henderson, Drew Oultram
Clive Churchill Medal: Dylan Edwards (Penrith)

== Player statistics and records ==
The following statistics are as of the conclusion of Round 25.

Top 5 point scorers

| Points | Player | Tries | Goals | Field goals |
|---|---|---|---|---|
| 224 | Valentine Holmes | 10 | 91 | 2 |
| 209 | Sam Walker | 7 | 90 | 1 |
| 188 | Mitchell Moses | 6 | 81 | 2 |
| 180 | Nicho Hynes | 6 | 76 | 4 |
| 167 | Zac Lomax | 6 | 71 | 1 |

Top 5 try scorers

| Tries | Player |
|---|---|
| 28 | Alex Johnston |
| 20 | Corey Oates |
| 17 | Jeremiah Nanai |
| 16 | Taylan May |
| 16 | Ronaldo Mulitalo |
| 16 | Josh Addo-Carr |

Top 5 goal scorers

| Goals | Player |
|---|---|
| 91 | Valentine Holmes |
| 90 | Sam Walker |
| 81 | Mitchell Moses |
| 76 | Nicho Hynes |
| 71 | Zac Lomax |

Top 5 tacklers

| Tackles | Player |
|---|---|
| 1,020 | Blayke Brailey |
| 1,010 | Reed Mahoney |
| 1,000 | Reece Robson |
| 943 | Lachlan Croker |
| 927 | Jeremy Marshall-King |

== Attendances ==
=== Club attendances ===
Club figures 2022
| Club | Home games | Total attendance | Average | Highest | Lowest | Total capacity | % capacity |
|---|---|---|---|---|---|---|---|
| Brisbane Broncos | 12 | 355,128 | 29,594 | 42,612 | 16,740 | 630,000 | 56.4% |
| Canberra Raiders | 12 | 151,441 | 12,620 | 16,647 | 6,492 | 285,121 | 53.1% |
| Canterbury-Bankstown Bulldogs | 11 | 147,993 | 13,454 | 20,184 | 9,544 | 555,000 | 24.2% |
| Cronulla-Sutherland Sharks | 11 | 114,077 | 10,370 | 11,459 | 8,927 | 230,000 | 49.6% |
| Gold Coast Titans | 11 | 140,616 | 12,783 | 19,245 | 8,774 | 301,400 | 46.7% |
| Manly-Warringah Sea Eagles | 11 | 125,753 | 11,432 | 17,385 | 6,972 | 210,000 | 59.9% |
| Melbourne Storm | 10 | 163,270 | 16,327 | 25,308 | 10,168 | 300,500 | 54.3% |
| Newcastle Knights | 12 | 200,683 | 16,724 | 25,169 | 9,472 | 393,000 | 51.1% |
| New Zealand Warriors | 11 | 124,662 | 11,333 | 26,001 | 3,560 | 196,000 | 63.6% |
| North Queensland Cowboys | 12 | 206,521 | 17,210 | 23,840 | 12,640 | 275,000 | 66.4% |
| Parramatta Eels | 11 | 240,275 | 20,022 | 28,336 | 10,017 | 342,500 | 70.2% |
| Penrith Panthers | 12 | 211,060 | 18,034 | 21,548 | 11,253 | 280,000 | 75.4% |
| South Sydney Rabbitohs | 11 | 171,708 | 15,609 | 30,194 | 9,242 | 781,559 | 22.0% |
| St. George Illawarra Dragons | 12 | 145,397 | 12,116 | 35,273 | 7,147 | 262,000 | 52.3% |
| Sydney Roosters | 11 | 169,063 | 15,369 | 41,906 | 5,527 | 459,059 | 36.8% |
| Wests Tigers | 11 | 120,990 | 10,999 | 15,124 | 7,182 | 243,500 | 49.7% |

=== Top regular season crowds ===
Top 25 regular season crowds
| Rank | Home team | Away team | Crowd | Venue | City |
|---|---|---|---|---|---|
| 1 | Brisbane Broncos | Melbourne Storm | 42,612 | Suncorp Stadium | Brisbane |
| 2 | Sydney Roosters | South Sydney Rabbitohs | 41,906 | Allianz Stadium | Sydney |
| 3 | Brisbane Broncos | North Queensland Cowboys | 37,761 | Suncorp Stadium | Brisbane |
| 4 | St. George Illawarra Dragons | Sydney Roosters | 35,273 | Sydney Cricket Ground | Sydney |
| 5 | Brisbane Broncos | Gold Coast Titans | 32,864 | Suncorp Stadium | Brisbane |
| 6 | Brisbane Broncos | South Sydney Rabbitohs | 32,002 | Suncorp Stadium | Brisbane |
| 7 | Brisbane Broncos | Parramatta Eels | 30,371 | Suncorp Stadium | Brisbane |
| 8 | South Sydney Rabbitohs | Canterbury-Bankstown Bulldogs | 30,194 | Accor Stadium | Sydney |
| 9 | Brisbane Broncos | St. George Illawarra Dragons | 29,234 | Suncorp Stadium | Brisbane |
| 10 | Parramatta Eels | Wests Tigers | 28,336 | Commbank Stadium | Sydney |
| 11 | Brisbane Broncos | Canberra Raiders | 28,142 | Suncorp Stadium | Brisbane |
| 12 | Parramatta Eels | Penrith Panthers | 26,912 | Commbank Stadium | Sydney |
| 13 | Parramatta Eels | Canterbury-Bankstown Bulldogs | 26,451 | Commbank Stadium | Sydney |
| 14 | New Zealand Warriors | Wests Tigers | 26,009 | Mount Smart Stadium | Auckland, NZ |
| 15 | Brisbane Broncos | Newcastle Knights | 25,742 | Suncorp Stadium | Brisbane |
| 16 | Melbourne Storm | Sydney Roosters | 25,308 | AAMI Park | Melbourne |
| 17 | Newcastle Knights | Parramatta Eels | 25,169 | McDonald Jones Stadium | Newcastle |
| 18 | North Queensland Cowboys | Penrith Panthers | 23,840 | Queensland Country Bank Stadium | Townsville |
| 19 | Parramatta Eels | Melbourne Storm | 23,758 | Commbank Stadium | Sydney |
| 20 | North Queensland Cowboys | Brisbane Broncos | 23,531 | Queensland Country Bank Stadium | Townsville |
| 21 | Brisbane Broncos | Sydney Roosters | 23,508 | Suncorp Stadium | Brisbane |
| 22 | Brisbane Broncos | Canterbury-Bankstown Bulldogs | 23,243 | Suncorp Stadium | Brisbane |
| 23 | Newcastle Knights | Wests Tigers | 23,214 | McDonald Jones Stadium | Newcastle |
| 24 | Parramatta Eels | South Sydney Rabbitohs | 22,958 | Commbank Stadium | Sydney |
| 25 | North Queensland Cowboys | Melbourne Storm | 22,728 | Queensland Country Bank Stadium | Townsville |

=== Magic Round ===
| Day | Home team | Away team | Crowd | Day figure | Venue | City |
Magic Round
| 1 | Canterbury-Bankstown Bulldogs | Newcastle Knights | 30,220 | 40,267 | Suncorp Stadium | Brisbane |
| 1 | Manly Warringah Sea Eagles | Brisbane Broncos | 40,267 | 40,267 | Suncorp Stadium | Brisbane |
| 2 | New Zealand Warriors | South Sydney Rabbitohs | 30,504 | 46,545 | Suncorp Stadium | Brisbane |
| 2 | Gold Coast Titans | St. George Illawarra Dragons | 41,593 | 46,545 | Suncorp Stadium | Brisbane |
| 2 | Melbourne Storm | Penrith Panthers | 46,545 | 46,545 | Suncorp Stadium | Brisbane |
| 3 | Cronulla-Sutherland Sharks | Canberra Raiders | 30,453 | 43,401 | Suncorp Stadium | Brisbane |
| 3 | Sydney Roosters | Parramatta Eels | 43,401 | 43,401 | Suncorp Stadium | Brisbane |
| 3 | Wests Tigers | North Queensland Cowboys | 43,401 | 43,401 | Suncorp Stadium | Brisbane |

=== Finals ===
| Rank | Home team | Away team | Crowd | Venue | City |
|---|---|---|---|---|---|
| 1 | Penrith Panthers | Parramatta Eels | 82,415 | Accor Stadium | Sydney |
| 2 | Penrith Panthers | South Sydney Rabbitohs | 50,034 | Accor Stadium | Sydney |
| 3 | Sydney Roosters | South Sydney Rabbitohs | 39,816 | Allianz Stadium | Sydney |
| 4 | Cronulla-Sutherland Sharks | South Sydney Rabbitohs | 39,733 | Allianz Stadium | Sydney |
| 5 | Parramatta Eels | Canberra Raiders | 29,134 | CommBank Stadium | Sydney |
| 6 | North Queensland Cowboys | Parramatta Eels | 25,572 | Queensland Country Bank Stadium | Townsville |
| 7 | Penrith Panthers | Parramatta Eels | 21,863 | BlueBet Stadium | Sydney |
| 8 | Melbourne Storm | Canberra Raiders | 20,838 | AAMI Park | Melbourne |
| 9 | Cronulla-Sutherland Sharks | North Queensland Cowboys | 12,477 | PointsBet Stadium | Sydney |

== Match officials ==
- Includes finals matches

| Referee | Games |
|---|---|
| Grant Atkins | 27 |
| Ashley Klein | 25 |
| Gerard Sutton | 25 |
| Adam Gee | 24 |
| Ben Cummins | 22 |
| Peter Gough | 19 |
| Todd Smith | 18 |
| Chris Sutton | 16 |
| Chris Butler | 13 |
| Ziggy Przeklasa-Adamski | 7 |
| Liam Kennedy | 5 |

== 2022 transfers ==
=== Players ===
| Player | 2021 club | 2022 club |
|---|---|---|
| Jesse Arthars | Brisbane Broncos | New Zealand Warriors |
| John Asiata | Brisbane Broncos | Leigh Centurions (Championship) |
| Ethan Bullemor | Brisbane Broncos | Manly Warringah Sea Eagles |
| Xavier Coates | Brisbane Broncos | Melbourne Storm |
| Brodie Croft | Brisbane Broncos | Super League: Salford Red Devils |
| Alex Glenn | Brisbane Broncos | Retirement |
| Karmichael Hunt | Brisbane Broncos | Retirement |
| Richard Kennar | Brisbane Broncos | South Sydney Rabbitohs |
| Danny Levi | Brisbane Broncos | Super League: Huddersfield Giants |
| Matthew Lodge | Brisbane Broncos | New Zealand Warriors |
| David Mead | Brisbane Broncos | Retirement |
| Anthony Milford | Brisbane Broncos | Newcastle Knights |
| Ben Te'o | Brisbane Broncos | Retirement |
| Siliva Havili | Canberra Raiders | South Sydney Rabbitohs |
| Ryan James | Canberra Raiders | Brisbane Broncos |
| Dunamis Lui | Canberra Raiders | New Zealand Warriors |
| Curtis Scott | Canberra Raiders | N/A |
| Bailey Simonsson | Canberra Raiders | Parramatta Eels |
| Iosia Soliola | Canberra Raiders | Retirement |
| George Williams | Canberra Raiders | Super League: Warrington Wolves |
| Sam Williams | Canberra Raiders | Retirement |
| Renouf Atoni | Canterbury-Bankstown Bulldogs | N/A |
| Dean Britt | Canterbury-Bankstown Bulldogs | N/A |
| Nick Cotric | Canterbury-Bankstown Bulldogs | Canberra Raiders |
| Christian Crichton | Canterbury-Bankstown Bulldogs | Penrith Panthers |
| Adam Elliott | Canterbury-Bankstown Bulldogs | Canberra Raiders |
| Will Hopoate | Canterbury-Bankstown Bulldogs | Super League: St. Helens |
| Sione Katoa | Canterbury-Bankstown Bulldogs | N/A |
| Lachlan Lewis | Canterbury-Bankstown Bulldogs | N/A |
| Nick Meaney | Canterbury-Bankstown Bulldogs | Melbourne Storm |
| Dylan Napa | Canterbury-Bankstown Bulldogs | Super League: Catalans Dragons |
| Ofahiki Ogden | Canterbury-Bankstown Bulldogs | Parramatta Eels |
| Chris Smith | Canterbury-Bankstown Bulldogs | Penrith Panthers |
| Dallin Watene-Zelezniak | Canterbury-Bankstown Bulldogs | New Zealand Warriors |
| Will Chambers | Cronulla-Sutherland Sharks | LA Giltinis (American rugby union) |
| Josh Dugan | Cronulla-Sutherland Sharks | Retirement |
| Shaun Johnson | Cronulla-Sutherland Sharks | New Zealand Warriors |
| Aaron Woods | Cronulla-Sutherland Sharks | St. George Illawarra Dragons |
| Anthony Don | Gold Coast Titans | Retirement |
| Jamal Fogarty | Gold Coast Titans | Canberra Raiders |
| Tyrone Peachey | Gold Coast Titans | Wests Tigers |
| Mitch Rein | Gold Coast Titans | Parramatta Eels |
| Sam Stone | Gold Coast Titans | Leigh Centurions (Championship) |
| Ashley Taylor | Gold Coast Titans | New Zealand Warriors |
| Jai Whitbread | Gold Coast Titans | Leigh Centurions (Championship) |
| Cade Cust | Manly Warringah Sea Eagles | Super League: Wigan Warriors |
| Jack Gosiewski | Manly Warringah Sea Eagles | St. George Illawarra Dragons |
| Curtis Sironen | Manly Warringah Sea Eagles | Super League: St. Helens |
| Moses Suli | Manly Warringah Sea Eagles | St. George Illawarra Dragons |
| Josh Addo-Carr | Melbourne Storm | Canterbury-Bankstown Bulldogs |
| Dale Finucane | Melbourne Storm | Cronulla-Sutherland Sharks |
| Nicho Hynes | Melbourne Storm | Cronulla-Sutherland Sharks |
| Ryley Jacks | Melbourne Storm | Featherstone Rovers (Championship) |
| Max King | Melbourne Storm | Canterbury-Bankstown Bulldogs |
| Brenko Lee | Melbourne Storm | Brisbane Broncos |
| Blake Green | Newcastle Knights | Retirement |
| Josh King | Newcastle Knights | Melbourne Storm |
| Mitchell Pearce | Newcastle Knights | Super League: Catalans Dragons |
| Gehamat Shibasaki | Newcastle Knights | Green Rockets Tokatsu (Japanese rugby union) |
| Connor Watson | Newcastle Knights | Sydney Roosters |
| Leeson Ah Mau | New Zealand Warriors | Retirement |
| Kane Evans | New Zealand Warriors | Super League: Hull F.C. |
| David Fusitu'a | New Zealand Warriors | Super League: Leeds Rhinos |
| Peta Hiku | New Zealand Warriors | North Queensland Cowboys |
| Ken Maumalo | New Zealand Warriors | Wests Tigers |
| Jamayne Taunoa-Brown | New Zealand Warriors | North Queensland Cowboys |
| Chad Townsend | New Zealand Warriors | North Queensland Cowboys |
| Roger Tuivasa-Sheck | New Zealand Warriors | Auckland Blues (Super Rugby) |
| Lachlan Burr | North Queensland Cowboys | Retirement |
| Jake Clifford | North Queensland Cowboys | Newcastle Knights |
| Corey Jensen | North Queensland Cowboys | Brisbane Broncos |
| Francis Molo | North Queensland Cowboys | St. George Illawarra Dragons |
| Michael Morgan | North Queensland Cowboys | Retirement |
| Justin O'Neill | North Queensland Cowboys | Retirement |
| Shane Wright | North Queensland Cowboys | Super League: Salford Red Devils |
| Blake Ferguson | Parramatta Eels | Leigh Centurions (Championship) |
| Joey Lussick | Parramatta Eels | Super League: St. Helens |
| Michael Oldfield | Parramatta Eels | Retirement |
| Will Smith | Parramatta Eels | Gold Coast Titans |
| Matt Burton | Penrith Panthers | Canterbury-Bankstown Bulldogs |
| Kurt Capewell | Penrith Panthers | Brisbane Broncos |
| Tyrone May | Penrith Panthers | Super League: Catalans Dragons |
| Paul Momirovski | Penrith Panthers | Sydney Roosters |
| Brent Naden | Penrith Panthers | Canterbury-Bankstown Bulldogs |
| Tevita Pangai Junior | Penrith Panthers | Canterbury-Bankstown Bulldogs |
| Braidon Burns | South Sydney Rabbitohs | Canterbury-Bankstown Bulldogs |
| Dane Gagai | South Sydney Rabbitohs | Newcastle Knights |
| Patrick Mago | South Sydney Rabbitohs | Super League: Wigan Warriors |
| Benji Marshall | South Sydney Rabbitohs | Retirement |
| Tautau Moga | South Sydney Rabbitohs | St. George Illawarra Dragons |
| Adam Reynolds | South Sydney Rabbitohs | Brisbane Broncos |
| Jaydn Su'A | South Sydney Rabbitohs | St. George Illawarra Dragons |
| Gerard Beale | St. George Illawarra Dragons | Brisbane Tigers (Hostplus Cup) |
| Adam Clune | St. George Illawarra Dragons | Newcastle Knights |
| Matthew Dufty | St. George Illawarra Dragons | Canterbury-Bankstown Bulldogs |
| Kaide Ellis | St. George Illawarra Dragons | Super League: Wigan Warriors |
| Cameron McInnes | St. George Illawarra Dragons | Cronulla-Sutherland Sharks |
| Trent Merrin | St. George Illawarra Dragons | Retirement |
| Corey Norman | St. George Illawarra Dragons | Super League: Toulouse Olympique |
| Jordan Pereira | St. George Illawarra Dragons | Brisbane Broncos |
| Paul Vaughan | St. George Illawarra Dragons | Canterbury-Bankstown Bulldogs |
| Brayden Wiliame | St. George Illawarra Dragons | USA Perpignan (French rugby union) |
| Dale Copley | Sydney Roosters | Retirement |
| Jake Friend | Sydney Roosters | Retirement |
| Matt Ikuvalu | Sydney Roosters | Cronulla-Sutherland Sharks |
| Lachlan Lam | Sydney Roosters | Leigh Centurions (Championship) |
| Isaac Liu | Sydney Roosters | Gold Coast Titans |
| Brett Morris | Sydney Roosters | Retirement |
| Josh Morris | Sydney Roosters | Retirement |
| Michael Chee-Kam | Wests Tigers | South Sydney Rabbitohs |
| Joseph Leilua | Wests Tigers | Featherstone Rovers (Championship) |
| Moses Mbye | Wests Tigers | St. George Illawarra Dragons |
| Russell Packer | Wests Tigers | Retirement |
| Brendan Elliot | Super League: Leigh Centurions | North Queensland Cowboys |
| Kevin Naiqama | Super League: St. Helens | Sydney Roosters |
| Oliver Gildart | Super League: Wigan Warriors | Wests Tigers |
| Jackson Hastings | Super League: Wigan Warriors | Wests Tigers |
| Fa'amanu Brown | Featherstone Rovers (Championship) | Wests Tigers |
| Tyrone Roberts | Norths Devils (Intrust Super Cup) | Brisbane Broncos |
| Young Tonumaipea | Melbourne Rebels (Super Rugby) | Melbourne Storm |
| George Burgess | N/A | St. George Illawarra Dragons |
| Te Maire Martin | N/A | Brisbane Broncos |
| James Segeyaro | Suspension | Manly Warringah Sea Eagles |

=== Mid-season transfers ===
| Player | Original club | → New club | Date of transfer |
|---|---|---|---|
| Jamayne Isaako | Brisbane Broncos | Gold Coast Titans | 22 March |
| Daniel Alvaro | St. George Illawarra Dragons | Toulouse Olympique (Super League) | 5 May |
| Kodi Nikorima | New Zealand Warriors | South Sydney Rabbitohs | 9 May |
| Brent Naden | Canterbury-Bankstown Bulldogs | Wests Tigers | 17 May |
| Matthew Dufty | Canterbury-Bankstown Bulldogs | Warrington Wolves (Super League) | 23 May |
| Thomas Mikaele | Wests Tigers | Warrington Wolves (Super League) | 24 June |
| Matthew Lodge | New Zealand Warriors | Sydney Roosters | 29 June |
| Will Smith | Gold Coast Titans | Hull F.C. (Super League) | 19 July |
| Luciano Leilua | Wests Tigers | North Queensland Cowboys | 21 July |

=== Loan moves ===
| Player | Home club | → Loan club | Dates | Pld | Ref |
|---|---|---|---|---|---|
| David Nofoaluma | Wests Tigers | Melbourne Storm | 1 August – 10 September (Round 21 – end of season) | 6 | |
| Oliver Gildart | Wests Tigers | Sydney Roosters | 1 August – 11 September (Round 21 – end of season) | 2 | |

== See also ==
- 2022 Australian football code crowds
- 2021 NRL Women's season (played in early 2022)
- 2022 NRL Women's season
