= Joseph Vuna =

US rugby league footballer

Joe Vuna
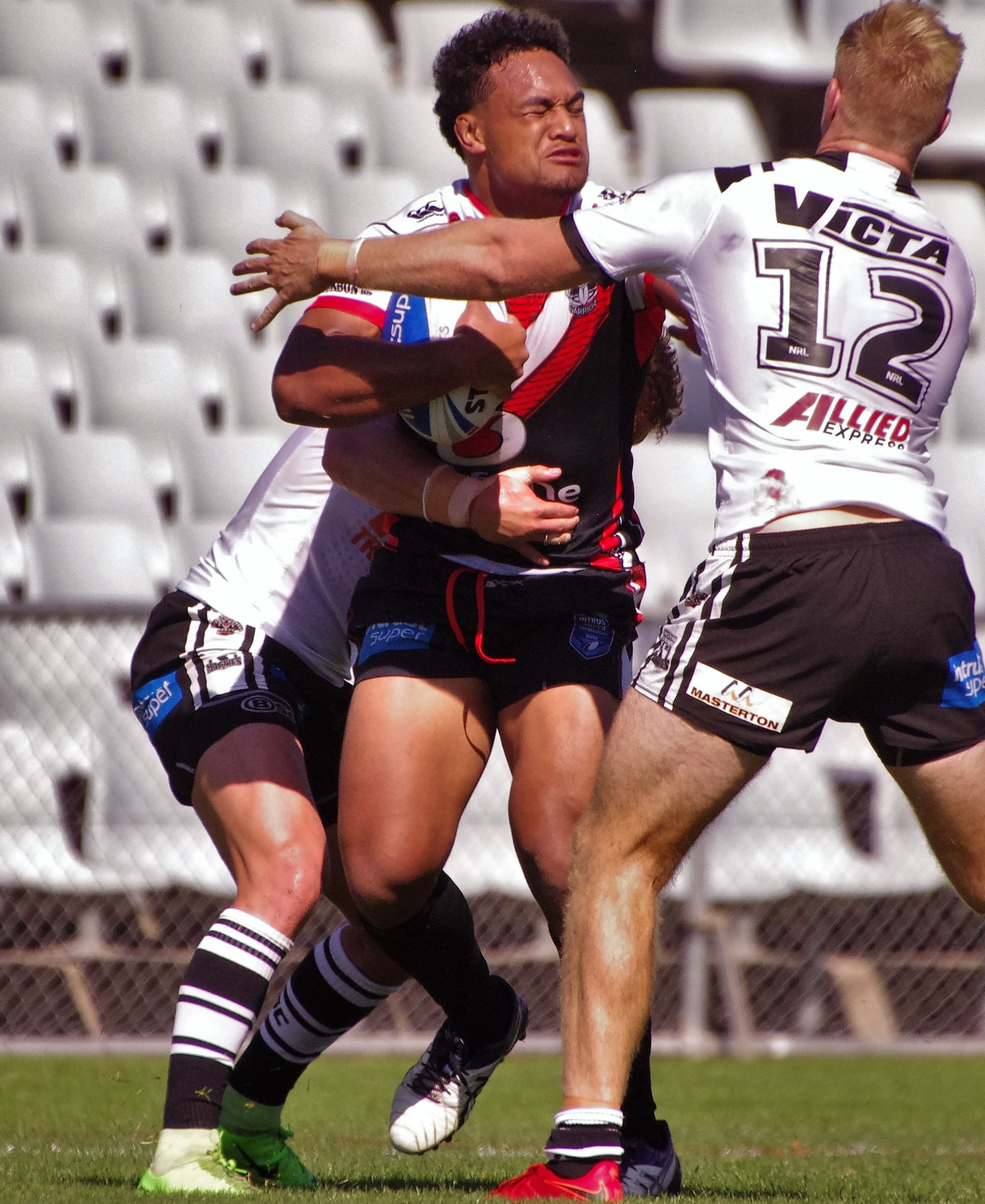

Personal information
- Full name: Joseph Vuna
- Born: 31 July 1998 (age 28) Alameda County, California, U.S.
- Height: 182 cm (6 ft 0 in)
- Weight: 100 kg (15 st 10 lb)

Playing information
- Position: Second-row, Lock, Centre
Club
Years	Team	Pld	T	G	FG	P
2018	New Zealand Warriors	4	0	0	0	0
2021–23	Gold Coast Titans	11	1	0	0	4
	Total	15	1	0	0	4
- Source: As of 3 September 2023

Joseph Vuna (born 31 July 1998) is a professional rugby league footballer who plays as a second-row forward for the Tweed Heads Seagulls.

He previously played for the New Zealand Warriors in the NRL.

== Background ==
Vuna was born in Alameda County, California, United States and grew up in New Zealand. He is the younger brother of dual-code rugby international Cooper Vuna.

== Career ==
=== 2018 ===
Vuna made his NRL debut for the New Zealand Warriors in their annual ANZAC Day match against the Melbourne Storm.

He left the club at the end of the 2018 season to go on a Mormon mission.

=== 2021 ===
Vuna began the 2021 season playing for the Tweed Heads Seagulls in the Queensland Cup, and returned to the NRL for the Gold Coast Titans in round 13 against the Melbourne Storm.

=== 2023 ===
Vuna played a total of 9 games for the Gold Coast in the 2023 NRL season as the club finished 14th on the table.
