= 2019 Gold Coast Titans season =

NRL rugby league season

- NRL Rank: 16th
- Play-off result: did not qualify
- 2019 record: Wins: 4; draws: 0; losses: 20
- Points scored: For: 370; against: 651

Team information
- CEO: Steve Mitchell
- Head Coach: Garth Brennan (Jan-Jul); Luke Burt (Jul-End of Season); Craig Hodges (Jul-End of Season)
- Captain: Ryan James (Jan-Apr) Tyrone Roberts (Apr-End of Season) Kevin Proctor
- Stadium: Robina Stadium – 27,690 (11 Games)
- Avg. attendance: 11,587
- High attendance: 16,201
- Low attendance: 8,680

Top scorers
- Tries: Dale Copley (9)
- Goals: Michael Gordon (27)
- Points: Michael Gordon (66)
← 2018	List of seasons	2020 →

The 2019 Gold Coast Titans season is the 13th in the club's history. They competed in the National Rugby League's 2019 Telstra Premiership. The start of season Captain, Ryan James ended his season and in-turn his captaincy due to an ACL rupture in April 2019, this brought forward a well-performing Tyrone Roberts to be selected as the team's captain for the rest of the 2019 NRL Season. The start of the year Head Coach Garth Brennan was axed in mid-July due to a "the results the club has achieved on the field this season have not met expectations", from the same weekend until the end of the season assistants Craig Hodges and Luke Burt took over as interim coaches. In late-July Gold Coast Titans confirmed a 2020 NRL Season coach after the recent dramas.

The 2019 NRL Season the titans came 16th place, this turns out to be the worst performance of the team since its 16th placing in the 2011 NRL season.

== Player movement ==
These movements happened across the previous season, off-season and pre-season.

=== Gains ===
Player/Coach	Previous club
Kallum Watkins	Leeds Rhinos
Tyrone Peachey	Penrith Panthers
Shannon Boyd	Canberra Raiders
Tyrone Roberts	Warrington Wolves
Ryley Jacks	Melbourne Storm
Jesse Arthars	South Sydney Rabbitohs
Brian Kelly	Manly Warringah Sea Eagles
Tanah Boyd	Brisbane Broncos
Sam Stone	Newcastle Knights

=== Losses ===
Player/Coach	New club
Kane Elgey	Manly Warringah Sea Eagles
Brendan Elliott	Manly Warringah Sea Eagles
Konrad Hurrell	Leeds Rhinos
Morgan Boyle	Manly Warringah Sea Eagles
Max King	Melbourne Storm
Ryan Simpkins	retired
Tony Matautia	N/A
Tyronne Roberts-Davis	Burleigh Bears

== Pre-Season Challenge ==
Date	Round	Opponent	Venue	Score	Tries	Goals	Attendance
Saturday, 23 February	Trial 1	North Queensland Cowboys	Sunshine Coast Stadium, Sunshine Coast, Queensland	16 - 22	Jesse Arthars 22'; Mitch Rein 35'; Leilani Latu 73'	Dylan Phythian (1/2); Jesse Arthars (1/1)	
Saturday, 2 March	Trial 2	Brisbane Broncos	Robina Stadium	22 - 25	Brenko Lee 8'; Kevin Proctor 14', 20'; Jesse Arthars 80'	Michael Gordon (3/3); Ashley Taylor (0/1)	

== Regular season ==
Date	Round	Opponent	Venue	Score	Tries	Goals	Attendance
Sunday, 17 March	1	Canberra Raiders	Robina Stadium	0 - 21			9,843
Saturday, 23 March	2	Cronulla-Sutherland Sharks	PointsBet Stadium	20 - 6	Brenko Lee 47'	Michael Gordon (1/1)	15,217
Sunday, 31 March	3	South Sydney Rabbitohs	Accor Stadium	28 - 20	Brian Kelly 23', 58'; Dale Copley 39'; Anthony Don 64'	Michael Gordon (2/4)	10,128
Friday, 5 April	4	New Zealand Warriors	Mount Smart Stadium	26 - 10	Dale Copley 59'; Anthony Don 63'	Ashley Taylor (1/2)	13,995
Friday, 12 April	5	Penrith Panthers	Robina Stadium	30 - 24	Tyrone Roberts 15'; Anthony Don 19'; Michael Gordon 35'; Jarrod Wallace 50'; Bryce Cartwright 67'	Michael Gordon (5/5)	8,680
Sunday, 21 April	6	Newcastle Knights	Robina Stadium	38 - 14	Phillip Sami 18'; Tyrone Roberts 21', 77'; Brian Kelly 37'; Anthony Don 48'; Michael Gordon 80'	Michael Gordon (5/6); PG: Michael Gordon (2/2)	11,654
Saturday, 27 April	7	Wests Tigers	Scully Park	30 - 14	Anthony Don 11'; Tyrone Peachey 15'	Michael Gordon (2/2); PG: Michael Gordon (1/1)	9,799
Friday, 3 May	8	North Queensland Cowboys	1300SMILES Stadium	28 - 14	Alexander Brimson 15'; Kevin Proctor 44'; Anthony Don 58'	Ashley Taylor (1/2) Tyrone Roberts (0/1)	10,655
Thursday, 9 May	9	Cronulla-Sutherland Sharks	Lang Park	18 - 26	Dale Copley 17'; Alexander Brimson 25'; Tyrone Peachey 36'	Michael Gordon (3/3)	17,113
Saturday, 18 May	10	Canterbury-Bankstown Bulldogs	Robina Stadium	16 - 22	Dale Copley 3', 10'	Ashley Taylor (2/2); PG: Ashley Taylor (2/3)	10,105
Friday, 24 May	11	Manly Warringah Sea Eagles	Brookvale Oval	18 - 36	Dale Copley 34', 55', 60'; Alexander Brimson 38'; Tyrone Roberts 47', 73'; Bryce Cartwright 69'	Ashley Taylor (4/7)	7,465
Sunday, 2 June	12	North Queensland Cowboys	Robina Stadium	4 - 6	Dale Copley 21'	Ashley Taylor (0/1)	11,226
Sunday, 9 June	13	Brisbane Broncos	Lang Park	18 - 26	Brian Kelly 12', 63'; Tyrone Roberts 23'; Anthony Don 38'	Tyrone Roberts (4/4); PG: Tyrone Roberts (1/1)	30,048
Friday, 14 June	14	Newcastle Knights	Robina Stadium	20 - 24	Ryley Jacks 22'; Brian Kelly 25'; Alexander Brimson 75'	Tyrone Roberts (3/3); PG: Tyrone Roberts (1/1)	9,973
Saturday, 29 June	15	Manly Warringah Sea Eagles	Robina Stadium	12 - 30	Phillip Sami 55', 66'	Tyrone Roberts (1/2); PG: Tyrone Roberts (1/1)	11,056
	16	BYE					
Friday, 12 July	17	Penrith Panthers	BlueBet Stadium,	24 - 2		PG: Tyrone Roberts (1/1)	10,317
Sunday, 21 July	18	Melbourne Storm	Robina Stadium	18 - 38	Brenko Lee 1'; Jarrod Wallace 6'; Bryce Cartwright 31'	Tyrone Roberts (3/3)	11,143
Saturday, 27 July	19	Brisbane Broncos	Robina Stadium	12 - 34	Michael Gordon 34'; Anthony Don 50'	Michael Gordon (2/2)	16,201
Sunday, 4 August	20	Sydney Roosters	Sydney Cricket Ground	58 - 6	Ryley Jacks 65'	Ashley Taylor (1/1)	9,763
Saturday, 10 August	21	St. George Illawarra Dragons	Jubilee Oval	40 - 28	Brian Kelly 15'; Kevin Proctor 37' Phillip Sami 49', 62'; Ryley Jacks 63'	Tyrone Peachey (4/5)	6,532
Friday, 16 August	22	Parramatta Eels	Robina Stadium	12 - 36	Brian Kelly 27'; Jesse Arthars 76'	Tyrone Peachey (2/2)	10,780
Sunday, 25 August	23	Melbourne Storm	AAMI Park	24 - 8	Jesse Arthars 15'	Michael Gordon (1/1); PG: Michael Gordon (1/1)	11,758
Saturday, 31 August	24	Newcastle Knights	McDonald Jones Stadium	38 - 4	Ryley Jacks 3'	Michael Gordon (0/1)	8,274
Saturday, 7 September	25	St. George Illawarra Dragons	Robina Stadium	16 - 24	Jai Arrow 13'; Mitch Rein 53'; Phillip Sami 74'	Michael Gordon (2/3)	11,274

== 2019 Squad ==
=== Statistics ===
Pos.	Name	National Rugby League			Total
Pos.	Name	Apps	Tries	Goals	Points
FB	Michael Gordon	16	3	27	66
FE	Tyrone Roberts	15	6	15	54
WG / CE	Dale Copley	15	9		36
CE	Brian Kelly	23	8		32
WG	Anthony Don	17	6		32
WG	Phillip Sami	15	6		24
FE / HB	Ashley Taylor	10		11	22
CE / FE / SR	Tyrone Peachey	21	2	6	20
FE / FE / FB / HB	AJ Brimson	21	4		16
HB	Ryley Jacks	13	4		16
SR	Bryce Cartwright	22	3		12
SR	Kevin Proctor	22	2		8
PR / LK	Jarrod Wallace	21	2		8
CE / WG	Jesse Arthars	12	2		8
WG / CE	Brenko Lee	6	2		8
HK	Mitch Rein	18	1		4
PR / LK	Jai Arrow	17	1		4
PR	Moeaki Fotuaika	21			0
LK / PR	Jai Whitbread	18			0
PR	Jack Stockwell	14			0
PR	Shannon Boyd	13			0
HK / LK	Nathan Peats	13			0
PR / LK	Max King	9			0
SR	Sam Stone	8			0
SR	Keegan Hipgrave	7			0
CE	Kallum Watkins	6			0
SR / PR	Ryan James	6			0
PR	Leilani Latu	3			0
HB	Tanah Boyd	2			0
SR / LK	Will Matthews	2			0
