= Phillip Sami =

Australian rugby league footballer

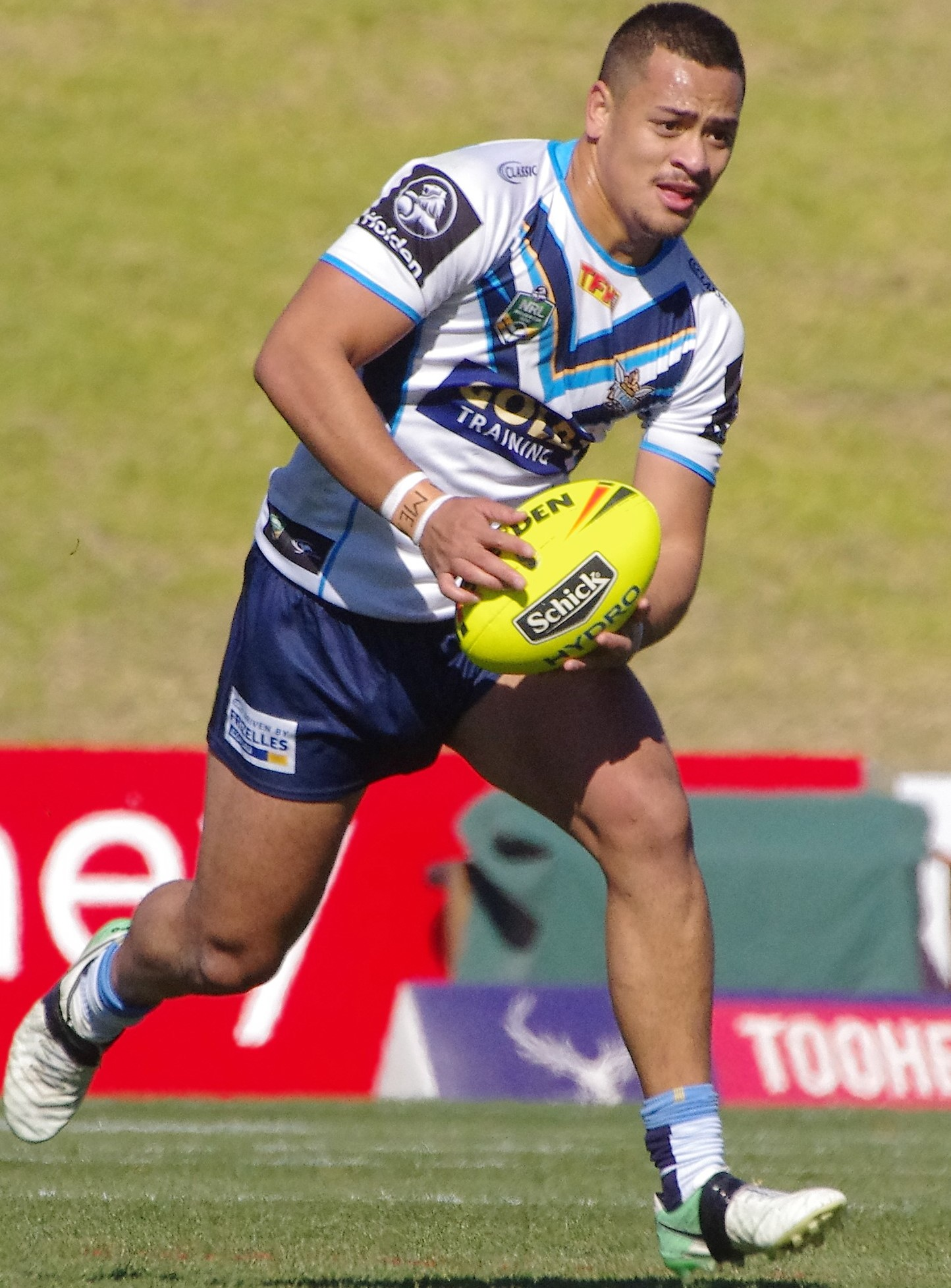

Personal information
- Born: 2 August 1997 (age 29) Ipswich, Queensland, Australia
- Height: 186 cm (6 ft 1 in)
- Weight: 97 kg (15 st 4 lb)

Playing information
- Position: Wing, Centre
Club
Years	Team	Pld	T	G	FG	P
2017–26	Gold Coast Titans	166	86	0	0	344
2027 -	St George Illawarra	0	0	0	0	0
	Total	166	86	0	0	344
Representative
Years	Team	Pld	T	G	FG	P
2020	Queensland	2	0	0	0	0
- Source: As of 4 September 2026

Phillip Sami (born 2 August 1997) is an Australian professional rugby league footballer who plays as a winger and centre for the St. George Illawarra Dragons in the National Rugby League (NRL). Sami has also represented his home state, Queensland, in the State of Origin series.

== Background ==
Sami was born in Ipswich, Queensland, to Samoan parents.

He played his junior rugby league for the Springfield Panthers, Goodna Eagles, and for Eastern Suburbs Tigers. Sami attended Ipswich State High School.

== Playing career ==
=== Early career ===
In 2015, Sami played for the Eastern Suburbs Tigers in the Mal Meninga Cup. In 2016 and 2017, he played for the Gold Coast Titans' NYC team.

=== 2017 ===
On 31 May, he was selected in the Queensland under-20 rugby league team.

In round 15 of the 2017 NRL season, Sami made his NRL debut for the Titans against the South Sydney Rabbitohs. In September, he was named at centre in the NYC Team of the Year.

=== 2018 ===
In round 4 of the 2018 season, he scored his first hat-trick of tries against the Brisbane Broncos, with the Gold Coast winning 26–14 at Suncorp Stadium.

=== 2019 ===
In round 23 of the 2019 NRL season, Sami set a new record for the fastest Gold Coast Titans player in history by running 35.9 km/h in a chase-down of Josh Addo-Carr.

Sami made a total of 16 appearances for the Gold Coast in the 2019 NRL season as the club endured a horror year on and off the field. During the halfway mark of the season, head coach Garth Brennan was sacked by the club after a string of poor results. The Gold Coast managed to win only 4 games for the entire season and finished last claiming the Wooden Spoon.

=== 2020 ===
Sami started the first five games of the year at fullback under new coach Justin Holbrook due to injuries by AJ Brimson and Tyrone Roberts. In round 4, Sami scored the match winning try against Wests Tigers in a 28–23 win from a Brian Kelly kick ending the Gold Coast's 364 day winning drought. Sami debuted for Queensland in Origin 1 in Adelaide playing on the wing in a 18–14 win. Sami played game 2 as well, however was dropped for Origin 3 following a poor performance in game 2.

=== 2021 ===
Sami played 18 games for the Gold Coast in the 2021 NRL season including the club's elimination final loss against the Sydney Roosters.

=== 2022 ===
Sami played a total of 14 games for the Gold Coast and scored six tries in the 2022 NRL season as the club finished 13th on the table.

=== 2023 ===
Sami played a total of 21 matches for the Gold Coast in the 2023 NRL season and scored 11 tries as the club finished 14th on the table.

=== 2024 ===
Sami made 13 appearances for the Gold Coast in the 2024 NRL season as the club finished 14th on the table.

=== 2025 ===
Sami played 21 matches for the Gold Coast in the 2025 NRL season scoring 15 tries as the club narrowly avoided the wooden spoon finishing 16th on the table.

=== 2026 ===
On 26 April, St. George Illawarra announced that they had signed Sami from 2027 on a three-year deal. In round 17 of the 2026 NRL season, Sami scored a hat-trick in the Gold Coast's 30-12 loss to Canterbury.

== Statistics ==
Year	Team	Games	Tries	Pts
2017	Gold Coast Titans	4	1	4
2018	Gold Coast Titans	23	14	56
2019	Gold Coast Titans	15	6	24
2020	Gold Coast Titans	13	7	28
2021	Gold Coast Titans	18	6	24
2022	Gold Coast Titans	14	6	24
2023	Gold Coast Titans	21	11	44
2024	Gold Coast Titans	13	5	20
2025	Gold Coast Titans	21	15	60
2026	Gold Coast Titans	22	15	60
	Totals	164	86	344
