= Junior Kangaroos =

Under-23 Australian rugby league team

Team information
- Nickname: Kangaroos
- Governing body: ARLC
- Region: Asia-Pacific
- Head coach: Neil Henry
- Captain: David Fifita
- Top try-scorer: Dane Gagai (4)
- Top point-scorer: Dane Gagai (16)

The Junior Kangaroos side represents Australia in the sport of rugby league. They are commonly known as the Junior Kangaroos, after the native marsupial of that name.

Since 2019, they are an under-23 side, with players selected from the NRL. They are administered by the Australian Rugby League Commission.

== History ==
Prior to 2010, the Junior Kangaroos was selected on an under-19 age basis. The best Australian players 19 years of age or younger, would represent the country against the likes of the Junior Kiwis, Papua New Guinea and Tonga, sometimes as curtain raisers to the senior Kangaroos games. Players such as Greg Bird, Matt Bowen, Justin Hodges, Luke Lewis, Jamie Lyon, Cameron Smith and Johnathan Thurston represented the Junior Kangaroos early in their careers and went on to play at the senior level for Australia. The last Junior Kangaroos side selected under the under 19 rules was in 2007. This would be the last Junior Kangaroos team until 2010.

In 2010, with the advent of the National Youth Competition, the Junior Kangaroos was switched to an under-20 team and played in a two Test series against the Junior Kiwis. From 2011 to 2018, the Junior Kangaroos have faced the Junior Kiwis at the end of each season in a one-off Test match, usually as a curtain raiser to a senior level Australia-New Zealand Test match.

In 2019, the ARL announced that Junior Kangaroos would be moving to an under-23 format and would play France at WIN Stadium.

== 2010 series ==
=== 1st Test ===
Played as a curtain raiser to the New Zealand-England Four Nations match.

23 October 2010

Junior Kiwis	16 – 24	Junior Kangaroos
Tries; Siuatonga Likiliki 1 Drury Low 1 Shaun Johnson 1 Goals; Shaun Johnson 2	Report	Tries; Dane Gagai 2 Michael Oldfield 1 Justin O'Neill 1 Cameron King 1 Goals; Cameron King 2

Westpac Stadium, Wellington, New Zealand
Referee: Henry Perenara

Junior Kangaroos
2010 team		Coaching staff
1 Dane Gagai – FB; 2 Michael Oldfield – WG; 3 Justin O'Neill – CE; 4 Ben Jones (c) – CE; 5 Josh Mansour – WG; 6 Corey Norman – FE; 7 Sam Williams – HB; 8 James Cunningham – PR; 9 Cameron King – HK; 10 Evrett Vaurasi – PR; 11 Mark Nicholls – SR; 12 Josh Jackson – SR; 13 Gerard Beale – LK	14 Matthew Wright – FB; 15 Tariq Sims – PR; 16 Mark Appleton – PR; 17 Kyle O'Donnell – SR	Head coach: David Hamilton; Legend: (c) Captain(s); (vc) Vice-captain(s); Updated: 2 October 2018; Source(s): NYCDB

=== 2nd Test ===
Played as a curtain raiser to the New Zealand-Papua New Guinea Four Nations match.

30 October 2010

Junior Kiwis	36 – 20	Junior Kangaroos
Tries; Lama Tasi 1 Drury Low 1 Nafe Seluini 1 Martin Taupau 1 Siuatonga Likiliki 1 Carlos Tuimavave 1 Goals; Shaun Johnson 6	Report	Tries; Michael Oldfield 1 Josh Jackson 1 Dane Gagai 1 Justin O'Neill 1 Goals; Cameron King 2

Rotorua International Stadium, Rotorua, New Zealand
Referee: Shane Rehm

Junior Kangaroos
2010 team		Coaching staff
1 Dane Gagai – FB; 2 Michael Oldfield – WG; 3 Justin O'Neill – CE; 4 Ben Jones (c) – CE; 5 Nathan Massey – WG; 6 Corey Norman – FE; 7 Sam Williams – HB; 8 James Cunningham – PR; 9 Cameron King – HK; 10 Tariq Sims – PR; 11 Mark Nicholls – SR; 12 Josh Jackson – SR; 13 Gerard Beale – LK	14 Dominic Walsh – FB; 15 Mark Appleton – PR; 16 Matthew Wright – PR; 17 Kyle O'Donnell – SR	Head coach: David Hamilton; Legend: (c) Captain(s); (vc) Vice-captain(s); Updated: 2 October 2018; Source(s): NYCDB

== 2011 match ==
Played as a curtain raiser to the Australia-New Zealand pre-Four Nations tournament match. Both coaches agreed to allow an 18th man be used during the match.

16 October 2011

Junior Kangaroos	16 – 28	Junior Kiwis
Tries; Dane Gagai 2 Stewart Mills 1 Kane Evans 1 Goals; Chad Townsend 2	Report	Tries; Sebastine Ikahihifo 2 John Palavi 1 Michael Parker-Walshe 1 Wayne Ulugia 1 Goals; Siliva Havili 3 Sio Siua Taukeiaho 1

Ausgrid Stadium, Newcastle, Australia
Referee: Adam Gee

Junior Kangaroos
2011 team		Coaching staff
1 Dane Gagai – FB; 2 Kyle Feldt – WG; 3 Mosese Pangai – CE; 4 Tautau Moga – CE; 5 Stewart Mills – WG; 6 Jacob Miller – FE; 7 Chad Townsend (c) – HB; 8 Matt Groat – PR; 9 Cameron King – HK; 10 Jack De Belin – PR; 11 Josh Jackson – SR; 12 Boyd Cordner – SR; 13 Dale Finucane (c) – LK	14 Nathan Massey – FB; 15 Alex McKinnon – SR; 16 Kane Evans – PR; 17 Ethan Lowe – SR; 18 Tyrone Roberts – HB	Head coach: Andrew Patmore; Legend: (c) Captain(s); (vc) Vice-captain(s)

== 2012 match ==
Played as a curtain raiser to the Australia-New Zealand end of year Test match.

13 October 2012

Junior Kangaroos	48 – 16	Junior Kiwis
Tries; Edrick Lee 2 Jack Wighton 2 Cheyse Blair 1 Tautau Moga 1 David Klemmer 1 Mahe Fonua 1 Jack Stockwell 1 Goals; Jacob Miller 6	Report	Tries; Ngataua Hukatai 2 David Fusitua 1 Carlos Tuimavave 1

Dairy Farmers Stadium, Townsville, Australia
Referee: Gavin Reynolds

Junior Kangaroos
2012 team		Coaching staff
1 Ben Hampton – FB; 2 Edrick Lee – WG; 3 Cheyse Blair – CE; 4 Tautau Moga – CE; 5 Mahe Fonua – WG; 6 Jack Wighton – FE; 7 Jacob Miller – HB; 8 David Klemmer – PR; 9 Michael Lichaa – HK; 10 Kane Evans – PR; 11 Alex McKinnon (c) – SR; 12 Chris Grevsmuhl – SR; 13 Jack Stockwell – LK	14 Dylan Napa – PR; 15 Korbin Sims – PR; 16 Tom Eisenhuth – SR; 17 Mitchell Cornish – HB	Head coach: Kelly Egan; Legend: (c) Captain(s); (vc) Vice-captain(s)

== 2013 match ==
13 October 2012

Junior Kangaroos	38 – 26	Junior Kiwis
Tries; Patrick Mago 2 Vai Toutai 1 Junior Paulo 1 David Nofoaluma 1 Charly Runciman 1 Mitchell Cornish 1 Goals; Bryce Cartwright 5	Report	Tries; Kurtis Rowe 2 Dallin Watene-Zelezniak 2 Raymond Faitala-Mariner 1 Goals; Mason Lino 3

WIN Jubilee Oval, Kogarah, Australia
Referee: Henry Perenara

Junior Kangaroos
2013 team		Coaching staff
1 Jack Ahearn – FB; 2 David Nofoaluma – WG; 3 Hymel Hunt – CE; 4 Charly Runciman – CE; 5 Vai Toutai – WG; 6 Moses Mbye – FE; 7 Mitchell Cornish (c) – HB; 8 Lloyd Perrett – PR; 9 Michael Lichaa (c) – HK; 10 Junior Paulo – PR; 11 Patrick Mago – SR; 12 Bryce Cartwright – SR; 13 Joseph Ualesi – LK	14 Kierran Moseley – HK; 15 Reagan Campbell-Gillard – PR; 16 Jake Trbojevic – PR; 17 Willis Meehan – SR	Head coach: Kelly Egan; Legend: (c) Captain(s); (vc) Vice-captain(s)

== 2014 match ==
18 October 2014

Junior Kiwis	15 – 14	Junior Kangaroos
Tries; Sam Manuleleua 1 Kodi Nikorima 1 Chance Peni 1 Goals; Zach Dockar-Clay 1 Field Goals; Te Maire Martin 1	Report	Tries; Valentine Holmes 2 Jake Mamo 1 Goals; Clinton Gutherson 1

Mt Smart Stadium, Auckland, New Zealand
Referee: Shane Rehm

Junior Kangaroos
2014 team		Coaching staff
1 Clinton Gutherson – FB; 2 Valentine Holmes – WG; 3 Euan Aitken – CE; 4 Jack Bird – CE; 5 Jake Mamo – WG; 6 Drew Hutchison – FE; 7 Ryan Matterson – HB; 8 Matthew Lodge – PR; 9 Cameron McInnes (c) – HK; 10 Joe Ofahengaue – PR; 11 Patrick Mago – SR; 12 Tevita Pangai – SR; 13 Kelepi Tanginoa – LK	14 Cameron Munster – FB; 15 Willis Meehan – PR; 16 Brett Greinke – SR; 17 Andy Saunders – PR	Head coach: Kelly Egan; Legend: (c) Captain(s); (vc) Vice-captain(s)

== 2015 match ==
Played as a curtain raiser to the Papua New Guinea-Fiji Melanesian Cup match and the Samoa-Tonga Polynesian Cup match.

2 May 2015

Junior Kangaroos	22 – 20	Junior Kiwis
Tries; Valentine Holmes 1 Robert Jennings 1 Brenko Lee 1 Tepai Moeroa 1 Goals; Jackson Hastings 2 Valentine Holmes 1	Report	Tries; Watson Heleta 1 Joseph Manu 1 Te Maire Martin 1 Tony Tumusa 1 Goals; Zach Dockar-Clay 2

Cbus Super Stadium, Gold Coast, Australia
Referee: Grant Atkins

Junior Kangaroos
2015 team		Coaching staff
1 Jackson Hastings – FB; 2 Brenko Lee – WG; 3 Robert Jennings – CE; 4 Jordan Drew – CE; 5 Valentine Holmes – WG; 6 Drew Hutchison – FE; 7 Ashley Taylor – HB; 8 Joe Ofahengaue – PR; 9 Jayden Berrell – HK; 10 Matthew Lodge (c) – PR; 11 Coen Hess – SR; 12 Tepai Moeroa – SR; 18 Jai Arrow – LK	13 Tevita Pangai – SR; 14 Tyrell Fuimaono – SR; 16 Jayden Nikorima – FE; 17 Alex Twal – PR	Head coach: Justin Holbrook; Legend: (c) Captain(s); (vc) Vice-captain(s)

== 2016 match ==
Played as a curtain raiser to the Papua New Guinea-Fiji Melanesian Cup match and the Samoa-Tonga Polynesian Cup match.

7 May 2016

Junior Kangaroos	34 – 20	Junior Kiwis
Tries; Nathan Cleary 1 JJ Felise 1 Robert Jennings 1 Brian Kelly 1 Curtis Scott 1 Connor Watson 1 Goals; Nathan Cleary 5	Report	Tries; Mafoa'aeata Hingano 2 Siosifa Talakai 1 Ken Tofilau 1 Goals; Jamayne Isaako 2

Pirtek Stadium, Parramatta, Australia
Referee: David Munro

Junior Kangaroos
2016 team		Coaching staff
1 Dylan Edwards – FB; 2 Curtis Scott – WG; 3 Robert Jennings – CE; 4 Tyrell Fuimaono – CE; 5 Brian Kelly – WG; 7 Lachlan Croker – HB; 6 Nathan Cleary – FE; 8 Tevita Pangai (c) – PR; 9 Jayden Nikorima – HK; 10 JJ Felise – PR; 11 Coen Hess – SR; 12 Jaydn Su'A – SR; 13 Tyrone May – LK	14 Junior Tatola – PR; 15 Jacob Host – SR; 16 Alex Twal – PR; 17 Connor Watson – FE	Head coach: Justin Holbrook; Legend: (c) Captain(s); (vc) Vice-captain(s); Updated: 1 May 2016; Source(s): NRL

== 2017 match ==
Played as a curtain raiser to the 2017 Anzac Test.

6 May 2017

Junior Kangaroos	46 – 22	Junior Kiwis
Tries; Tyronne Roberts-Davis 2 Reece Robson 2 Corey Allan 1 Jai Field 1 Victor Radley 1 Jaydn Su'A 1 Goals; Jai Field 5		Tries; 1 Dane Aukafolau; 1 Jarome Luai; 1 Steven Marsters; 1 Briton Nikora; Goals; 3 Patrick Herbert

GIO Stadium, Canberra, Australia
Referee: Phil Henderson

Junior Kangaroos
2017 team		Coaching staff
1 Corey Allan – FB; 2 Tyronne Roberts-Davis – WG; 3 Enari Tuala – CE; 4 Jesse Ramien – CE; 5 Curtis Scott – WG; 6 Jai Field – FE; 7 Brodie Croft (c) – HB; 8 Stefano Hala – PR; 9 Reece Robson – HK; 10 Blake Lawrie – PR; 11 Jaydn Su'A – SR; 12 Sam Stone – SR; 13 Cameron Murray – LK	14 Victor Radley – LK; 15 Jack Murchie – SR; 16 Ray Stone – LK; 17 Emre Guler – PR	Head coach: Justin Holbrook; Legend: (c) Captain(s); (vc) Vice-captain(s); Updated: 4 May 2017; Source(s): NRL

== 2018 match ==
Played as a curtain raiser to the Australia-New Zealand end of year Test match.

13 October 2018

Junior Kiwis	24 – 40	Junior Kangaroos
Tries; Jackson Ferris 1 Steven Marsters 1 Sean Mullany 1 Isaiah Papali'i 1 Joseph Vuna 1 Goals; Chanel Harris-Tavita 2/5	Report	Tries; 2 Tino Fa'asuamaleaui; 2 Enari Tuala; 1 Corey Allan; 1 Thomas Flegler; 1 Louis Geraghty; Goals; 6/7 Zac Lomax

Mt Smart Stadium, Auckland, New Zealand
Referee: Chris McMillan

Junior Kangaroos
2018 team		Coaching staff
1 Corey Allan – FB; 2 Enari Tuala – WG; 3 Gehamat Shibasaki – CE; 4 Zac Lomax – CE; 5 Murray Taulagi – WG; 6 Sean O'Sullivan – FE; 7 Jake Clifford (c) – HB; 8 Patrick Carrigan – PR; 9 Reece Robson – HK; 10 Emre Guler – PR; 15 Louis Geraghty – SR; 12 Kotoni Staggs – SR; 13 Corey Horsburgh – LK	11 Shawn Blore – SR; 14 Blayke Brailey – HK; 16 Thomas Flegler – PR; 17 Tino Fa'asuamaleaui – SR	Head coach: Neil Henry • Mark O’Meley; Legend: (c) Captain(s); (vc) Vice-captain(s); Updated: 2 October 2018; Source(s): NRL

== 2019 match ==
Played as a curtain raiser to the Australia-New Zealand Oceania Cup match.

25 October 2019

Junior Kangaroos	62 – 4	France
Tries; Goals	Report	Tries; Goals

WIN Stadium, Wollongong, Australia
Referee: Grant Atkins

Junior Kangaroos
2019 team		Coaching staff
1 Ryan Papenhuyzen – FB; 2 Campbell Graham – WG; 3 Brian Kelly – CE; 4 Zac Lomax – CE; 5 Reuben Garrick – WG; 6 Kalyn Ponga – FE; 7 Brodie Croft – HB; 8 Corey Horsburgh – PR; 9 Reed Mahoney – HK; 10 Thomas Flegler – PR; 11 David Fifita (c) – SR; 12 Angus Crichton – SR; 13 Victor Radley – LK	14 AJ Brimson – FB; 15 Nat Butcher – LK; 16 Emre Guler – PR; 17 Tino Fa'asuamaleaui – SR; 18 Gehamat Shibasaki – CE	Head coach: Neil Henry; Legend: (c) Captain(s); (vc) Vice-captain(s); Updated: 7 October 2019; Source(s): NRL

== Players ==
=== Captains ===
- Ben Jones (2010)
- Dale Finucane (2011)
- Chad Townsend (2011)
- Alex McKinnon (2012)
- Mitchell Cornish (2013)
- Michael Lichaa (2013)
- Cameron McInnes (2014)
- Matthew Lodge (2015)
- Tevita Pangai Junior (2016)
- Brodie Croft (2017)
- Jake Clifford (2018)
- David Fifita (2019)

== Coaches ==
- David Hamilton (2010)
- Andrew Patmore (2011)
- Kelly Egan (2012–2014)
- Justin Holbrook (2015–2017)
- Neil Henry (2018–present)

== See also ==
- Australia national rugby league team
- Australian Aboriginal rugby league team
