= Nathan Friend =

Australian rugby league footballer (born 1981)

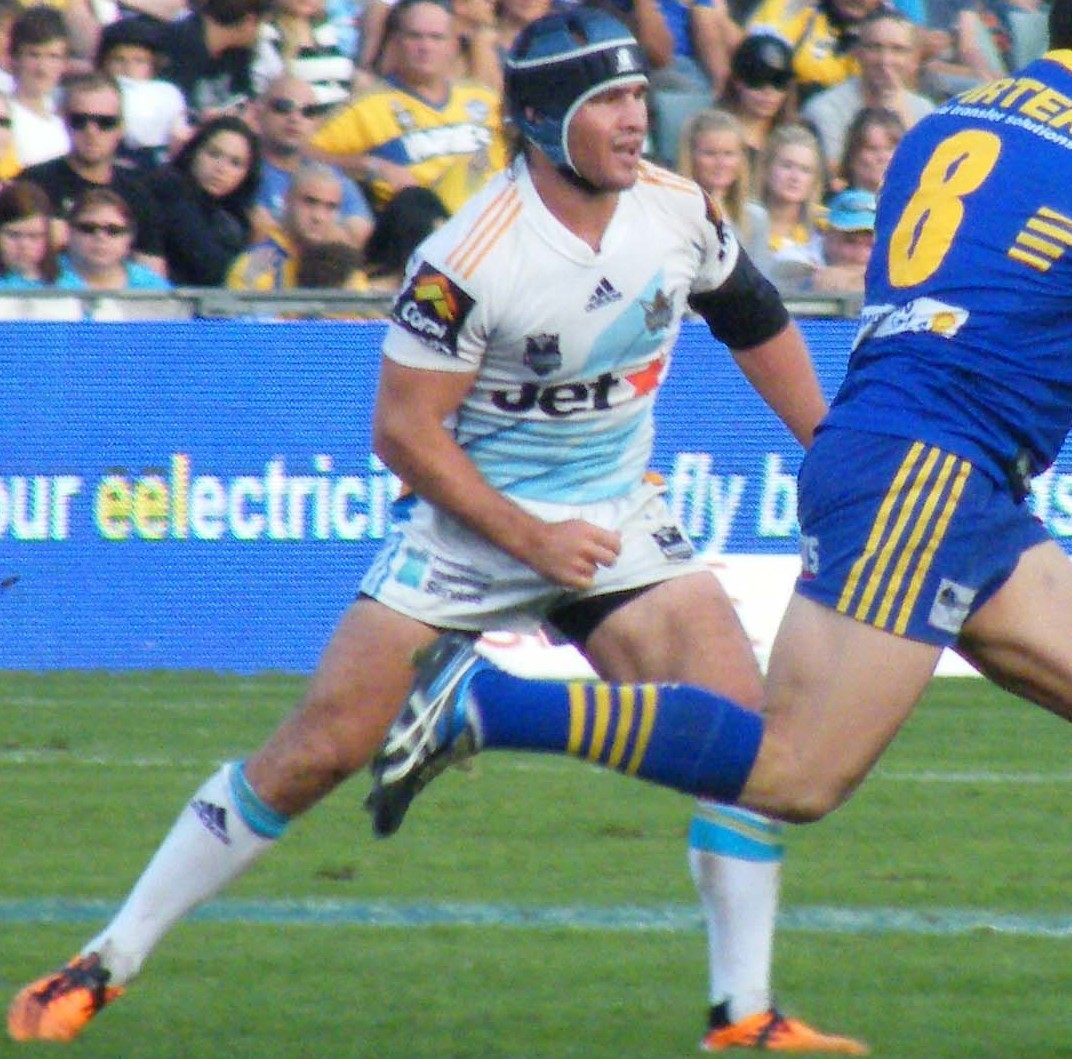

Personal information
- Born: 28 February 1981 (age 45) Toowoomba, Queensland, Australia

Playing information
- Height: 172 cm (5 ft 8 in)
- Weight: 85 kg (13 st 5 lb)
- Position: Hooker
Club
| Years | Team | Pld | T | G | FG | P |
|---|---|---|---|---|---|---|
| 2002 | Brisbane Broncos | 1 | 0 | 0 | 0 | 0 |
| 2003–06 | Melbourne Storm | 34 | 0 | 0 | 0 | 0 |
| 2007–11 | Gold Coast Titans | 100 | 7 | 0 | 0 | 28 |
| 2012–15 | New Zealand Warriors | 86 | 7 | 0 | 0 | 28 |
| 2016 | Gold Coast Titans | 21 | 0 | 0 | 0 | 0 |
| | Total | 242 | 14 | 0 | 0 | 56 |
Representative
| Years | Team | Pld | T | G | FG | P |
| 2005 | Queensland Residents | 1 | 0 | 0 | 0 | 0 |
| 2015 | NRL All Stars | 1 | 0 | 0 | 0 | 0 |

Nathan "The Hobbit" Friend (born 28 February 1981 in Toowoomba, Queensland) is an Australian former professional rugby league footballer who played for the Gold Coast Titans in the National Rugby League (NRL). He previously played for the Brisbane Broncos, Melbourne Storm and New Zealand Warriors. He plays as a hooker.

== Early life ==
Born and raised in Toowoomba, Friend started playing league at the age of five for Wests Juniors, staying with the club until under-15 level. He was then picked for the Toowoomba under-17 side, subsequently playing one season in the local A-grade competition. In 2000 he joined the Brisbane Broncos' feeder club, the Toowoomba Clydesdales and in 2002 he moved to Brisbane to train full-time with the Broncos. He made his first-grade debut later that year.

== Playing career ==
Friend joined the Melbourne Storm in 2003. In 2005, he announced that he would be one of the founding members of the Gold Coast in 2007.

The 2006 NRL season was the first season where Friend played regular first grade football. Out of Melbourne's 29 matches in 2006, Friend played in 21 of the games including all three of the Storm's finals series matches. Friend only lost two games out of the 21 he played in 2006. He played in the 2006 NRL Grand Final for Melbourne as one of their interchange players. Melbourne lost the match 15–8 to his former club the Brisbane Broncos at Telstra Stadium.

In 2007, Friend played on the interchange bench in the Titans' inaugural game, a 20–18 home loss to the St George Illawarra Dragons. He continued to play on the bench for the first eight games of the season. In Round 9, he replaced Clint Amos as the Titans' starting hooker and remained first choice hooker for the rest of the season. The Titans' Round 20 loss to the South Sydney Rabbitohs was the only game in the 2007 season that Friend did not play in.

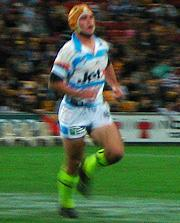
Friend playing for the Titans in 2008

In 2008, Friend remained first choice hooker for the Titans. He scored his first ever try in first grade in the Titans' 30–12 away loss to the St George Illawarra Dragons in Round 2.

The 2009 NRL season was Friend's best year in the NRL. He played as starting hooker in all of the club's matches in 2009 as the Gold Coast reached the finals for the first time, finishing in third place. He scored more tries in 2009 than he did in the rest of his NRL career, scoring four. Their season ended in disappointment with the Titans losing both of their finals games to the Brisbane Broncos and Parramatta Eels respectively. Friend won the Paul Broughton Medal for the Gold Coast Titans' player of the year in 2009.

In 2010, Friend again played in all of the Titans' games in that season. This meant that he had played 56 consecutive games for the Gold Coast Titans. Friend was also given an opportunity to play State of Origin due to an injury to first choice hooker Cameron Smith before game one. Friend was up against other Queensland hookers such as Matt Ballin, Andrew McCullough, Jake Friend, Kevin Kingston and Aaron Payne. Matt Ballin was selected ahead of Friend, mainly due to his age.

"What a wholehearted and competitive player this man has been his entire career. We’ve marvelled at his workload and consistent intensity through every game he has ever played."

— −Phil Gould

The Gold Coast had a slow start to the 2011 season, losing all of their first three games. Friend was injured and unable to play in all of these games and many attribute the losses to the fact that Friend was absent and his replacement Riley Brown did not have the same impact as Friend. His injury also meant that his run of 56 consecutive matches for the Titans came to an end. At the end of the 2011 NRL season, the Gold Coast finished last on the table and claimed their first wooden spoon.

On 11 April 2011, Friend signed with New Zealand Warriors for the 2012 and 2013 seasons with an option for 2014. In August 2013 the Warriors took up the option for 2014 and in May 2014 his persistent tackling saw them extending his stay at the Warriors by a further year, for the 2015 season.

In round 18 2015, in the Warriors' last victory of the season, against the Melbourne Storm, Friend was a key player in one of the best tries of the season. He was upended and displayed his best acrobatic moves after chasing a Chad Townsend bomb kick, delivering a back flip pass between his legs to Sam Tomkins.

On 30 July 2015, after four years with the Warriors, Friend signed a 1-year contract to return to the Gold Coast, starting in 2016.

== Statistics ==
| Year | Team | Games | Tries | Pts |
|---|---|---|---|---|
| 2002 | Brisbane Broncos | 1 | | |
| 2003 | Melbourne Storm | 7 | | |
| 2004 | Melbourne Storm | 3 | | |
| 2005 | Melbourne Storm | 3 | | |
| 2006 | Melbourne Storm | 21 | | |
| 2007 | Gold Coast Titans | 23 | | |
| 2008 | Gold Coast Titans | 21 | 2 | 8 |
| 2009 | Gold Coast Titans | 26 | 4 | 16 |
| 2010 | Gold Coast Titans | 26 | 1 | 4 |
| 2011 | Gold Coast Titans | 4 | | |
| 2012 | New Zealand Warriors | 17 | 2 | 8 |
| 2013 | New Zealand Warriors | 21 | | |
| 2014 | New Zealand Warriors | 24 | 2 | 8 |
| 2015 | New Zealand Warriors | 24 | 3 | 12 |
| 2016 | Gold Coast Titans | 21 | | |
| | Totals | 242 | 14 | 56 |

== Post playing ==
Friend retired at the end of the 2016 NRL season and now works as a bricklayer, a job he did part time during his playing career.
