= 2020 Gold Coast Titans season =

NRL rugby league season

- NRL Rank: 9th
- 2020 record: Wins: 9; losses: 11
- Points scored: For: 346; against: 643

Team information
- CEO: Steve Mitchell
- Coach: Justin Holbrook
- Captain: Kevin Proctor Jamal Fogarty Jai Arrow Nathan Peats Tyrone Roberts
- Stadium: Robina Stadium
- Avg. attendance: 4,604
- High attendance: 9,877

Top scorers
- Tries: Anthony Don (10)
- Goals: Ashley Taylor (36)
- Points: Ashley Taylor (84)
← 2019	List of seasons	2021 →

The 2020 Gold Coast Titans Season is the 14th season competing in the 2020 NRL season. The team was coached by Justin Holbrook in his debut season.

== Fixtures ==
=== Pre-season ===
Date	Round	Opponent	Venue	Result	Score	GCT. Tries	GCT. Goals	Report
29 February	Trial	Brisbane Broncos	Dolphin Stadium, Brisbane	Win	28-22	Kevin Proctor (1); Anthony Don (1); Mitch Rein (1); Jai Arrow (1); Dale Copley (1)	Ashley Taylor 4/5	
Legend: Win Loss Draw Bye

=== Regular season ===
Date	Round	Opponent	Venue/Attendance	Result	GCT.	Opp.	Tries	Goals	Field goals	Report
13 March	1	Canberra Raiders	Canberra Stadium, Canberra; Attendance: 10,610	Loss	6	24	Anthony Don (1)	Ashley Taylor 1/1		
22 March	2	Parramatta Eels	Robina Stadium, Gold Coast; Attendance: 0	Loss	6	46	Dale Copley (1)	Ashley Taylor 1/1		
29 May	3	North Queensland Cowboys	Townsville Stadium, Townsville; Attendance: 0	Loss	6	36	Brian Kelly (1)	Ashley Taylor 1/1		
7 June	4	Wests Tigers	Lang Park, Brisbane; Attendance: 0	Win	28	23	Kevin Proctor (1); Anthony Don (1); Keegan Hipgrave (1); Brian Kelly (1); Phillip Sami (1)	Ashley Taylor 4/5		
13 June	5	South Sydney Rabbitohs	Western Sydney Stadium, Sydney; Attendance: 401	Loss	12	32	Phillip Sami (1); Bryce Cartwright (1)	Ashley Taylor 2/2		
19 June	6	St. George Illawarra Dragons	Lang Park, Brisbane; Attendance: 1,930	Loss	8	20	Tanah Boyd (1)	Ashley Taylor 2/2		
27 June	7	Brisbane Broncos	Lang Park, Brisbane; Attendance: 6,262	Win	30	12	Anthony Don (2); Ashley Taylor (1); Sam Lisone (1); Phillip Sami (1)	Ashley Taylor 1/2		
3 July	8	Cronulla Sharks	Robina Stadium, Gold Coast; Attendance: 1,995	Loss	10	40	Corey Thompson (1); Anthony Don (1)	Ashley Taylor 1/2		
10 July	9	New Zealand Warriors	Robina Stadium, Gold Coast; Attendance: 5,206	Win	16	12	Anthony Don (1); Sam Stone (1); Beau Fermor (1)	Jamal Fogarty 1/1; Ashley Taylor 1/2		
17 July	10	Melbourne Storm	Sunshine Coast Stadium, Sunshine Coast; Attendance: 5,043	Loss	6	42	Brian Kelly (1)	Ashley Taylor 1/1		
25 July	11	Penrith Panthers	Robina Stadium, Gold Coast; Attendance: 11,315	Loss	14	22	Jamal Fogarty (1); Brian Kelly (1); Anthony Don (1)	Ashley Taylor 1/3		
31 July	12	Sydney Roosters	Sydney Cricket Ground, Sydney; Attendance: 3,149	Loss	12	18	Anthony Don (1); Phillip Sami (1)	Ashley Taylor 2/3		
8 August	13	North Queensland Cowboys	Gold Coast Stadium, Gold Coast; Attendance: 5,646	Win	30	10	Alexander Brimson (2); Anthony Don (1); Kevin Proctor (1); Brian Kelly (1); Phillip Sami (1)	Jamal Fogarty 3/6		
14 August	14	Cronulla Sharks	Jubilee Oval, Sydney; Attendance: 1,701	Loss	18	30	Corey Thompson (1); Jarrod Wallace (1); Keegan Hipgrave (1)	Ashley Taylor 2/2; Jamal Fogarty 1/1		
21 August	15	Canberra Raiders	Robina Stadium, Gold Coast; Attendance: 6,561	Loss	16	36	Phillip Sami (1); Alexander Brimson (1); Keegan Hipgrave (1)	Jamal Fogarty 2/3		
28 August	16	St. George Illawarra Dragons	Jubilee Oval, Sydney; Attendance: 2,097	Win	14	10	Phillip Sami (1); Tyrone Peachey (1); Jamal Fogarty (1)	Jamal Fogarty 1/3		
4 September	17	Canterbury Bulldogs	Stadium Australia, Sydney; Attendance: 2,048	Win	18	14	Corey Thompson (1); Beau Fermor (1); Jamal Fogarty (1); Anthony Don (1)	Ashley Taylor 1/4		
12 September	18	Brisbane Broncos	Robina Stadium, Gold Coast; Attendance: 9,729	Win	18	6	Mitch Rein (1); Sam Stone (1); Young Tonumaipea (1)	Ashley Taylor 3/3		
18 September	19	Manly Sea Eagles	Brookvale Oval, Sydney; Attendance: 2,452	Win	42	24	Alexander Brimson (2); Young Tonumaipea (2); Corey Thompson (1); Sam Stone (1); Kevin Proctor (1); Treymain Spry (1)	Ashley Taylor 5/8		
25 September	20	Newcastle Knights	Robina Stadium, Gold Coast; Attendance: 9,877	Win	36	6	Ashley Taylor (2); Alexander Brimson (2); Mitch Rein (1); Brian Kelly (1); Kevin Proctor (1)	Ashley Taylor 3/5; Jamal Fogarty 1/2		
Legend: Win Loss Draw Bye
