= Craig Hodges (rugby league) =

Australian RL coach and former rugby league footballer

Personal information
- Full name: Craig Hodges
- Born: 27 December 1973 (age 52)

Coaching information
Club
Years	Team	Gms	W	D	L	W%
2017	Gold Coast Titans	2	0	0	2	0
2019	Gold Coast Titans	8	0	0	8	0
	Total	10	0	0	10	0
- Source: As of 22 September 2019

Craig Hodges (born 27 December 1973) was the interim co-coach of the Gold Coast Titans in the NRL. Hodges and Luke Burt were the co-caretakers at the Gold Coast until the end of the 2019 NRL season, they were replaced by incoming head coach Justin Holbrook ahead of the 2020 NRL season.

Craig is now a facilitator at Leading Teams.

== Coaching career ==
Hodges was an assistant coach at the Titans under previous head coach Garth Brennan. He was an assistant coach to Paul Green at Wynnum Manly.

Hodges recorded back-to-back 2011-12 Queensland Cup titles with the Wynnum Manly Seagulls. Hodges then coached the Norths Devils, before taking charge of the Brisbane Broncos under 20s side between 2013 and 2016.

In Round 20 of the 2019 NRL season, the Gold Coast suffered their second heaviest defeat as a club losing 58–6 to the Sydney Roosters at the Sydney Cricket Ground. Hodges described the loss by saying “The fear is that it is the habit they allow...that becomes acceptable for them individually whether they stay here or whether they move on to other places, And if that’s what they take out of this season, if that’s their legacy moving forward from this season, I think that’s a terrible tragedy".

In Round 22 of the 2019 NRL season against the Parramatta Eels, the Gold Coast lost the match 36–12 at Cbus Super Stadium which all but confirmed that the club would finish last and claim the wooden spoon with just 3 games remaining. The Gold Coast were officially handed the wooden spoon the following week as they lost 24–8 against Melbourne at AAMI Park. The wooden spoon capped off a bad year for sport on the Gold Coast as the other team representing the region, the Gold Coast Suns finished last in the AFL.

In 2021, Hodges joined the New Zealand Warriors as an assistant coach.

After Peter O’Sullivan, the recruitment manager for the club, left to join the newly formed Dolphins (NRL), Hodges was promoted to General Manager of Football for the Warriors in November 2021.
