= Kyle O'Donnell =

Australian rugby league footballer

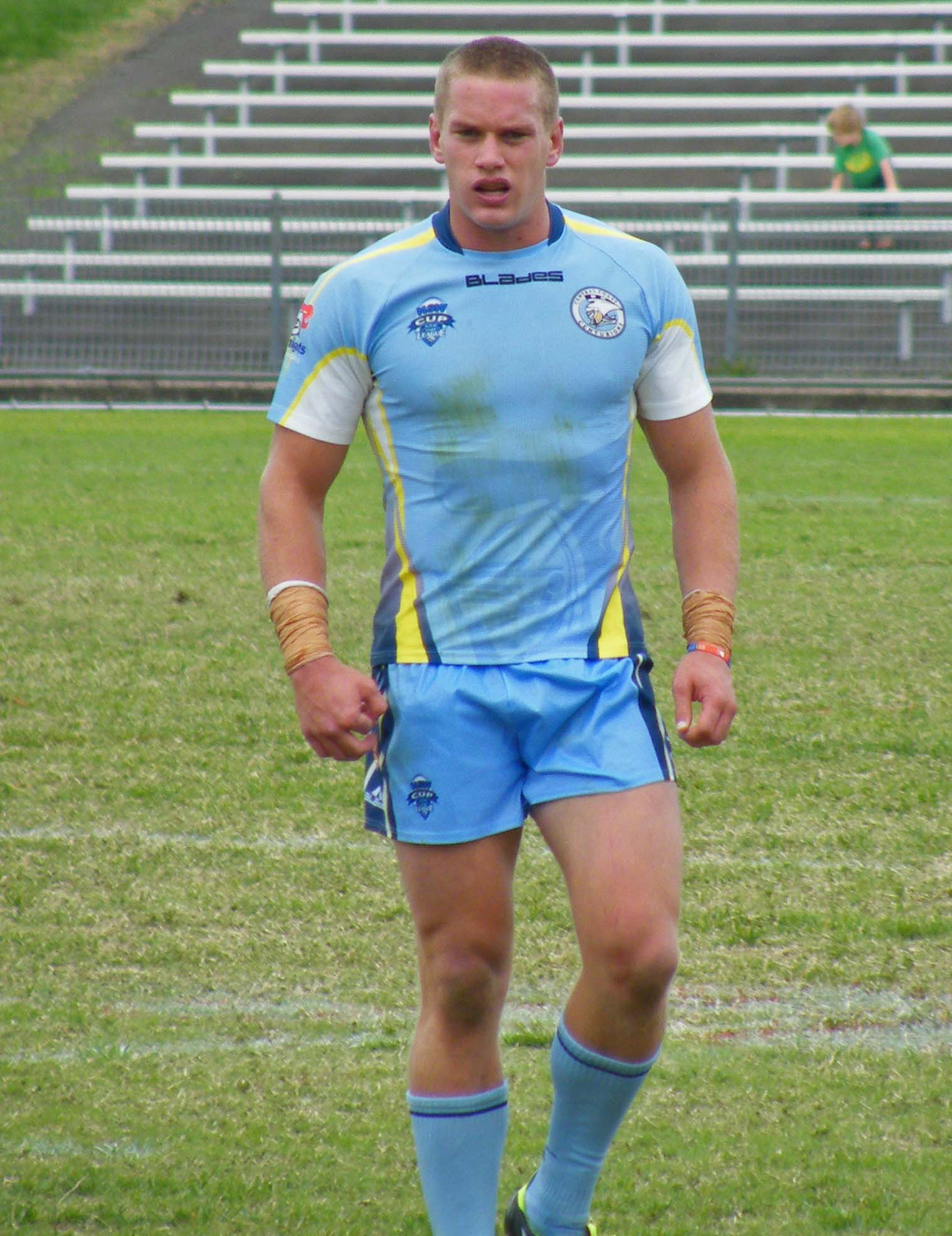
- O'Donnell playing for the Central Coast Centurions in 2011.

Personal information
- Born: 9 October 1990 (age 35) Nowra, New South Wales, Australia

Playing information
- Height: 193 cm (6 ft 4 in)
- Weight: 108 kg (17 st 0 lb)
- Position: Prop, Second-row, Lock
Club
Years	Team	Pld	T	G	FG	P
2012	Newcastle Knights	1	0	0	0	0
2014	Canberra Raiders	5	0	0	0	0
	Total	6	0	0	0	0
- Relatives: Luke O'Donnell (brother)

Kyle O'Donnell (born 9 October 1990) is an Australian former professional rugby league footballer. He played at prop, second-row and lock and played for the Newcastle Knights and Canberra Raiders in the National Rugby League. He is the younger brother of Australian international Luke O'Donnell.

== Playing career ==
Born in Nowra, New South Wales, O'Donnell played his junior football for the Greystanes Devils, he attended Primary school at Mount Pritchard East in Sydney's south-western suburbs. In 2008, O'Donnell played for the NSW CCC side. He was then signed by the Cronulla-Sutherland Sharks. O'Donnell played for the Sharks' NYC team in 2009 and 2010, scoring 7 tries in 30 games. In the NYC, he played in the centres and on the wing, occasionally appearing in the back-row.

On 27 June 2010, O'Donnell signed a 2-year contract with the Newcastle Knights starting in 2011. Knights coach Rick Stone said O'Donnell was player with real potential. In 2010, O'Donnell was selected in the Junior Kangaroos squad to play the Junior Kiwis.

In 2011, O'Donnell played for the Knights' NSW Cup team, the Central Coast Centurions, playing mainly in the second-row. He moved to prop in 2012 with success, making the New South Wales Residents representative team. In the same week as playing for Residents team, O'Donnell made his NRL debut for the Knights against the South Sydney Rabbitohs in Round 18 of the 2012 season after initially being named 18th man. Just 7 minutes into his debut, O'Donnell was knocked out from clashing heads with Sam Burgess and had to be assisted off the field with concussion.

On 2 August 2012, O'Donnell signed a 2-year contract with the Penrith Panthers starting in 2013. In 2012, O'Donnell was selected on the bench for the NSW Residents team to play the QLD Residents at Suncorp Stadium as a curtain raiser to the Game 3, State of Origin decider.

On 18 November 2013, O'Donnell signed a 1-year contract with the Canberra Raiders starting in 2014 after not being able to break into the Panthers' NRL team. While at Canberra, O'Donnell played for the Mount Pritchard Mounties in the NSW Cup and managed 5 NRL games in the top grade before retiring at the end of the 2015 season.
