= Josh Patston =

Australian professional rugby league player

Personal information
- Full name: Joshua Patston
- Born: 24 September 1998 (age 27) North Shore, New South Wales, Australia
- Height: 189 cm (6 ft 2 in)
- Weight: 107 kg (16 st 12 lb)

Playing information
- Position: Second-row, Lock
Club
Years	Team	Pld	T	G	FG	P
2025–	Gold Coast Titans	22	1	0	0	4
- Source: As of 4 September 2026

Josh Patston (born 24 September 1998) is an Australian rugby league footballer who plays as a second-row forward for the Gold Coast Titans in the National Rugby League.

== Background ==
Patston was born in Sydney and is of Indigenous (Wiradjuri) descent.

He was raised in Lismore, where he played his junior rugby league for the Lismore Marist Brothers Rams.

== Playing career ==
=== Early career ===
In 2021, after several seasons playing for Marist's NRRRL side, he joined the Tweed Seagulls in the Queensland Cup.

In 2023, Patston earned a pre-season train and trial contract with the Melbourne Storm and joined their feeder club, the Sunshine Coast Falcons. In 2024, while playing for the Burleigh Bears, he underwent pre-season training with the Brisbane Broncos, playing two trial games.

=== 2025 ===
Patston joined the Gold Coast Titans for the 2025 preseason on a train and trial contract. He began the season playing for the Ipswich Jets.

In Round 15 of the 2025 NRL season, Patston made his NRL debut for the Titans in a 28–8 win over the Manly Sea Eagles. In Round 24, he scored his first NRL try in a loss to the Cronulla Sharks. On 27 September, the Titans announced that Patston had signed a two year extension.
