= Jett Liu =

Australian rugby league footballer (born 2004)

Personal information
- Born: 21 May 2004 (age 22) Leeton, New South Wales, Australia
- Height: 194 cm (6 ft 4 in)
- Weight: 109 kg (17 st 2 lb)

Playing information
- Position: Prop
Club
Years	Team	Pld	T	G	FG	P
2026–	Gold Coast Titans	2	0	0	0	0
- Source: RLP

Jett Liu (born 21 May 2004) is an Australian rugby league footballer for the Gold Coast Titans in the National Rugby League (NRL).

== Early life ==
Liu comes from Leeton in the Riverina and is of Dutch, Scottish and Samoan descent. He played junior rugby league for the Leeton Raiders and Wagga Wagga Kangaroos.

== Career ==
A forward, Liu started out with the Canberra Raiders, playing for the club in the 2022 SG Ball Cup. He then moved to the St. George Illawarra Dragons, where he featured in the NSW Cup from 2023 to 2025. Prior to the 2026 season, Liu was signed by the Titans on a development contract, which will ensure him a place on their 2027 Top 30 squad. He made two first-grade appearances for the Titans during the 2026 NRL season.

== Personal life ==
Liu began studying for a law degree while playing for the Dragons.
