= Gold Coast Titans =

National Rugby League football club based in Gold Coast, Queensland, Australia

Club information
- Full name: Gold Coast Titans
- Nickname: Titans
- Short name: GLD or GCT
- Colours: Light blue Gold; White; Navy blue
- Founded: 27 April 2005; 21 years ago
- Website: titans.com.au

Current details
- Ground: Robina Stadium (27,690)
- CEO: Steve Mitchell
- Coach: Josh Hannay (NRL); Karyn Murphy (NRLW)
- Captain: Tino Fa'asuamaleaui (NRL); Georgia Hale (NRLW)
- Competition: National Rugby League
- 2026 season: 16th
- Current season

Uniforms
Home colours	Away colours

Records
- Premierships: None
- Runners-up: None
- Minor premierships: None
- Wooden spoons: 2 (2011, 2019)
- Most capped: 187 – Moeaki Fotuaika
- Highest try scorer: 86 – Phillip Sami
- Highest points scorer: 719 – Scott Prince

The Gold Coast Titans are a professional rugby league football club, based on the Gold Coast, Queensland, Australia. The club competes in the National Rugby League (NRL) premiership, Australia's elite rugby league competition. Since 2008, the Titans have played their home games at Robina Stadium in Robina. The Titans joined the NRL in 2007.

The Gold Coast Titans were the first national-level franchise from the Gold Coast region since the previous franchise of the Gold Coast-Tweed Giants from 1988 to 1989 which rebranded to Gold Coast Seagulls from 1990 to 1995 who played their home games at Seagulls Stadium in Tweed Heads West. The club was rebranded to Gold Coast Gladiators and then rebranded again to Gold Coast Chargers from 1996 to 1998 their home ground was relocated to Carrara Stadium in Carrara.

== History ==
=== Formation ===
The beginnings of a Gold Coast team's bid to return to the National Rugby League began when the Australian Rugby League decided to remove the financially successful Gold Coast Chargers from the National Rugby League at the end of the 1998 Season. The ARL wanted to have a second major team based in Brisbane and believed the best way to achieve this was by removing the Gold Coast team from the competition. The attempt to launch a second Brisbane team failed and in 1999, Michael Searle, former Gold Coast Chargers player and Managing Director of International Sports Australia, formed a Gold Coast Bid Team. The team included former Chargers boss Paul Broughton and was labelled as "The Gold Coast Consortium" by the media. The board was constantly active in lobbying the NRL to both expand the competition and consider the Gold Coast's bid for inclusion. It was successful in organising pre-season NRL trial matches to be hosted on the Gold Coast and with average attendances of over 16,000, and peak attendances topping 20,000, the popularity of rugby league on the Coast was clear.

I firmly believe rugby league should be looking to expand. The Gold Coast area is growing at a phenomenal rate. There are 89 rugby league teams in Gold Coast primary schools and 59 teams in Gold Coast high schools representing about 2,300 young players. That's just schoolboys.

If the catchment area includes the region from South Brisbane to Byron Bay in northern NSW, then it covers a rugby league heartland starving for recognition. These areas would only blossom even more if the young players had a senior team in the NRL competition to which they could aspire.

South-east Queensland needs another NRL team desperately and for a whole host of reasons.

— Phil Gould, 21 December 2003

In August 2004, the NRL rejected Michael Searle's bid for re-adding a Gold Coast team. However, later, during an episode of Nine Network's The NRL Footy Show, the "Gold Coast Consortium" announced their team name and jersey to the public from the Gold Coast Convention and Exhibition Centre. Initially the team was to be named the Gold Coast Dolphins, with the team colours to be white, jade and orange. While the Dolphins moniker was popular among many, the heavyweight Brisbane Queensland Cup side the Redcliffe Dolphins saw it as a threat for any prospect of entering the NRL they had, and as a result threatened severe legal action if the Gold Coast used the Dolphins name. Midway through that year the National Rugby League announced that after viewing submissions from the Gold Coast Dolphins, the Central Coast Bears and the Wellington Orcas, there would not be a 16th team included in the 2006 NRL competition. Reasons given to the Gold Coast was the National Rugby Leagues concern over the quality and capacity of their home ground, Carrara Stadium, which is an oval and only seats 16,000 (although it has been known to fit in 23,000 after minor redevelopment).

Although their bid was knocked back, the consortium continued to push heavily in 2005 for a Gold Coast team, changing the entry year to 2007. The Gold Coast received a massive boost when the Queensland Government announced they would spend A$100 million on a new, 25,000-seat rectangular stadium in Robina for the Gold Coast should they be accepted into the 2007 competition. The stadium would not be completed until early 2008 yet the promise of a new first-class facility was enough for the NRL to accept the Gold Coasts bid and on 27 May 2005, NRL CEO David Gallop announced that the Gold Coast franchise would be the 16th team in the 2007 NRL season.

In the time since the Gold Coast was admitted, the Titans completed a vigorous recruitment drive, they announced the signing of Sydney Roosters assistant coach John Cartwright as the Titans first head-coach and successfully signed contracts with established players such as Dally M Medal winner Preston Campbell, Queensland & Australian representative Scott Prince, New South Wales & Australian representative Luke Bailey and enticing former league player Mat Rogers back from rugby union.

=== 2007–2008: Laying the foundations ===
Chart of yearly table positions for Gold Coast Titans in First Grade NRL

In February 2007, the Titans played their historic first game in a trial against the previous season's Minor-Premiers and Grand Finalists Melbourne Storm, previously the newest club in the League (apart from the merged teams). They were beaten in the club's first hit-out but over the following weeks, Cartwright fielded his full-strength team in two other pre-season trials, winning 22–10 over the Parramatta Eels for the club's first victory. The following week in the team first played in front of their home fans on the Gold Coast, they ran out 28–6 winners over the Penrith Panthers. Although merely trial matches, the signs were positive for the Titans' debut season to come.

The Titans played their first official match in round 1 of the 2007 NRL season against the St. George Illawarra Dragons. Their first game was moved from their home ground, Carrara Stadium, to Lang Park in Brisbane due to the huge demand of fans eager to see the new Gold Coast outfit in action, and on 18 March 2007, in front of over 42,000 people they made their debut. Gold Coast performed admirably but after falling 14 points behind in the second half 20–6 they could not manage a full comeback losing a tight match 20–18. Former Queensland State of Origin winger Chris Walker, who had been released by Melbourne Storm due to off-field troubles in 2006, started his rugby league comeback scoring two tries and two conversions for a 14-point haul for the Titans.

The close loss to St. George Illawarra would not last long in the memories of Titans fans as a week later the Gold Coast franchise recorded their first official victory in another tight match, winning 18–16 against the Cronulla-Sutherland Sharks at home. The start of the season saw the Titans only manage four wins in the first ten rounds but a mid-season five-week-long winning streak of four wins and a bye saw the Titans sitting in the top four at the conclusion of round 15. The streak was ended in a poor 22–6 loss against the Warriors at home, then they slumped to a five-match losing streak which included a golden point loss to the Brisbane Broncos in Round 17 and a 56–10 loss at the hands of the Canberra Raiders in Round 18. The Gold Coast would not register another win until round 21, but by then they had already slipped to 11th position and needed to obtain maximum points from the final four rounds to confirm a spot in the finals in their maiden season. The side only managed one win from the final four matches, however, missing out on the finals. In the final round, a 50–6 thrashing at the hands of [Melbourne Storm] ended the Titans' debut season on somewhat of a sour note, with the young Gold Coast franchise finishing the season in 12th position with 10 wins, 14 losses and a bye for 22 competition points.

Despite having an outdated home ground as they waited for their new stadium to be completed, the Titans had the second-highest average attendance of all NRL clubs for 2007.

At the end of 2007 Luke Bailey and Anthony Laffranchi were named co-winners of the club's inaugural Paul Broughton Medal for best and fairest player of the season.

In their debut season, the Gold Coast club had turned over $16 million.

The 2008 NRL season was the Titans' second in the National Rugby League. A major boost for the Titans was the signing of past Queensland representative Ashley Harrison from the Sydney Roosters.

The Titans played their first official match at their new Stadium, Robina Stadium, against the North Queensland Cowboys with the final score being 36–18. Rookie Jordan Atkins became only the second person in the history of Australian rugby league to score four tries on debut, alongside Canterbury's Tony Nash in 1942. The sellout 26,974-strong crowd assisted the Titans in firmly establishing that they were a force to be reckoned with in 2008.

The club went on to hit top place on the NRL ladder for the first time after round 6. They managed to maintain top spot on the ladder all the way until round 11, when a loss to Wests Tigers saw them forfeit top spot to the Sydney Roosters, who led in points differential. At the conclusion of Round 14, the Titans were equal first on points, fourth on points differential, employing a perfect home record for inspiration. Despite facing a tough home stretch, the Titans placed admirably in their pursuit of an inaugural finals campaign.

One of the Titans' strongest points in 2008 was the form of halfback Scott Prince, who earned selection for State of Origin. However, early in Game 3, his arm was broken, putting him on the sideline for the season. Subsequently, the Titans lost four straight games.

They finished their season at 13th on the NRL ladder.

This year their turnover increased to $22 million and the club posted a $1.5 million profit.

=== 2009–2010: First finals appearance ===
The Titans secured four new signings for the 2009 season in Sam Tagataese, Matthew White, Jackson Nicolau and Raiders speedster William Zillman.

Similar to the Titans previous seasons, they find themselves on top of the competition ladder after six rounds sitting on ten premiership points alongside their rivals the Brisbane Broncos. Early victories against the Canterbury Bulldogs and the Melbourne Storm away from home without skipper Scott Prince, silenced many of their critics who believed they could not win away from the holiday strip or without their veteran halfback.

Many of the Titans NYC side made their debut and turned into regular first-graders, such as Esi Tonga, David Mead and Kevin Gordon. Kayne Lawton, Bodene Thompson and Selasi Berdie also made their NRL debut.

The club's most successful season so far saw them finish in third position, which was in 2009. They were two points behind the competition front-runners St. George Illawarra Dragons and the Canterbury-Bankstown Bulldogs. In the 2009 finals series, they lost their qualifying final 40–32 against the Brisbane Broncos, then lost the semi-final 27–2 against the Parramatta Eels.

The Titans signed five new players for the 2010 season in Joe Tomane, Marshall Chalk, Riley Brown, Clinton Toopi, Greg Bird and Steve Michaels

The Titans lost a number of players for the 2010 season, including Ben Jeffery, Brenton Bowen, Chris Walker, Daniel Conn, Brett Delaney and Siosaia Vave.

For the second year in succession the Titans qualified for the finals, finishing 4th and thereby earning a home qualifying final against the fifth-placed Warriors. The Titans' 28–16 win, coupled with losses for two other top four teams, meant that the Titans earned the week off and a right to host a preliminary final at the larger Lang Park, which turned out to be its 100th ever premiership match. The Titans lost to the resurgent Sydney Roosters, 32–6, ending their season one week short of the Grand Final. After 2010 the Titans finished up 4th overall in the 2010 NRL season, with Mat Rogers retiring at the conclusion of the season.

=== 2011–2012: The wooden spoon and player turnover ===
During the off-season the Titans lost inspirational five-eighth Mat Rogers to retirement.

To date the Titans have recorded their worst-ever start to a season, losing four of their first five matches against St. George Illawarra, Melbourne, the Brisbane Broncos and North Queensland by scorelines of 16–25, 16–38, 10–12 and 16–20, respectively. They never recovered from their horror start to the year only winning 6 games all year which is their worst season to date finishing on 16 points and receiving the wooden spoon.

The Titans signed seven new players for the 2012 season including former Australian and NSW representative Jamal Idris and current QLD representative Nate Myles former Cronulla-Sutherland Sharks prop Luke Douglas They also lost key foundation players such as Preston Campbell, Anthony Laffranchi, Nathan Friend and Mat Rogers.

The club started their 2012 with an impressive 18–0 win over the North Queensland Cowboys away from home. However, the success was very short-lived, losing the next five in a row, four of which were at home. round 7 saw Aidan Sezer make his NRL debut against the Manly Warringah Sea Eagles at Brookvale Oval. The Titans produced a 26–14 upset, with Sezer scoring in his debut. Debutant for the Titans Jamal Idris coughing up two tries in the round 7 match-up. The next two games were losses.

From rounds 10–21, the Gold Coast side managed a mid season revival. In the period, the club only lost three times, with seven wins and two byes. The revival was not enough to push them into the finals, as they lost four of their last five matches.

==== Financial problems ====
In March 2012 it was found that the Gold Coast had fallen into $35 million debt. The team fought wind-up proceedings in the Federal Court and managed to survive the crippling situation. Newly appointed CEO David May revealed that the club was debt free in 2013.

=== 2013–2014: Promising starts, mid-season fadeouts and salary cap breach ===
The Titans only signed a handful of players for the 2013 season, most notably Australian and Queensland representative Dave Taylor, as well as controversial halfback Albert Kelly, who had been sacked from his previous 2 clubs. The club, however, also lost their captain Scott Prince to the Brisbane Broncos.

The club managed to win 4 of their first 6 matches to put themselves in the top 8. They then lost consecutive matches against the Newcastle Knights and the Warriors. Since then, the club and won another 4 from their next 6, to put them at 5th on the ladder. An injury to form centre Jamal Idris for the rest of the season derailed their promising campaign. The club their next 4 matches, seeing them slide outside the top 8. Prop Ryan James hit a purple patch of form in the last 6 rounds. However, the club only managed to win 3 of these 6 games, which was not enough to push them inside the top 8. The Titans finished on 26 points, 2 points behind the 8th placed North Queensland Cowboys

During the season, the Gold Coast Titans managed to break their widest-ever winning margin (heading into the season) three times. Their biggest-ever win before 2013 was by 26 points against the Parramatta Eels back in 2007. In 2013, the club managed a 36-point win over the Canberra Raiders, a 38-point win over the Parramatta Eels, and a 28-point win over the Wests Tigers. Another positive to come out of the season was the new halves pairing of Albert Kelly and Aiden Sezer, who played the majority of the season alongside one another.

Before the 2014 season started, the Gold Coast Titans lost marquee centre Jamal Idris to the Penrith Panthers. The centre left the club only 2 years into his 5-year contract, because he wanted to be closer to his family in Sydney. The Titans did not sign any marquee players for the 2014 season, but did pick up Penrith centre Brad Tighe, Melbourne utility Maurice Blair, and Bulldogs forward Paul Carter. One of the Titan's foundation players, Luke O'Dwyer, also retired.

The beginning of the 2014 season look promising for the Titans. The club managed to win 5 of their first 6 games, putting them at outright 1st on the NRL ladder. This period included a 4-game winning streak, including a nail biting Queensland derby against the Brisbane Broncos, and a controversial 2-point win over the Melbourne Storm in Melbourne. In rounds 7 and 8, the club recorded a 2-point loss to the Panthers, and a 14-point win over the Wests Tigers in Sydney. However, the promising start to the year ended there. The club then suffered 6 straight losses, 5 of which were at their home ground. Round 17 saw the Titans record their first win in over two months, with an ugly 4-point win over the South Sydney Rabbitohs. However, the club then suffered a defeat by the out of form Canberra Raiders on the Gold Coast. In round 19, the Titans travelled to Newcastle for the cornerstone match in the 'Rise for Alex Round'. The Titans managed to produce a 22–6 upset win. Since then, however, the club has lost another 6 straight games, including a dismal 42–0 loss to the Warriors. This would be the first time the club has been held to nil since their inception in 2007.

In round 24, prop Luke Douglas would miss his first-ever game since his debut in 2006, after being suspended as a result of the 2011 Cronulla-Sutherland Sharks supplements scandal. His record streak was halted at 215 consecutive games.

From round 11 to round 20, David Taylor produced his best patch of form since joining the club. This included 5 tries in 6 games, and also earned him a recall into the Queensland State of Origin team for games 2 and 3 of the 2014 series. Halfback Albert Kelly also had a promising start to the season, scoring 5 tries in the opening 5 games, 4 of which were intercept tries. Foundation coach John Cartwright would coach his last game in round 22, after announcing he would be standing down from the role. Assistant coach Neil Henry will coach the club for the remaining 4 rounds.

The Titans were able to end the difficult year on a high upsetting the Bulldogs who went on the play in the grand final at home 19–18.

After an investigation by the NRL into the Titans and five other clubs (Brisbane Broncos, Manly-Warringah Sea Eagles, Newcastle Knights and Sydney Roosters), the Titans were fined $300,000.

=== 2015–2019: NRL takeover; Return to the Finals and disastrous years ===
On 24 February, the club was placed into voluntary administration and its licence was transferred to the NRL in February 2015.

One day before the 2015 NRL season kicked off, Daly Cherry-Evans announced he would join the club on a four-year deal starting from 2016, with the deal reported to be worth over $1 million a season. Titans Chief Executive Officer, Graham Annesley, stated "I think this signing sends a positive sign to the rugby league world that this club does have a future and it can attract quality players and it can turn itself around." However, on 3 June 2015, Cherry-Evans reneged his deal with the Titans, and re-signed with the Manly Warringah Sea Eagles.

After the money from Cherry-Evans' contract was freed up, due to him no longer joining the club for the 2016 season and beyond, the Titans signed a handful of players during the off-season. Signings included halves Tyrone Roberts and Ashley Taylor from the Newcastle Knights and Brisbane Broncos, respectively, former Titans hooker Nathan Friend from the Warriors, props David Shillington and Zeb Taia from the Canberra Raiders and Catalans Dragons, and premiership winning second-rower Chris McQueen from the South Sydney Rabbitohs.

The first half of the Titans' season was shaky, having won six games, and also losing six games, sitting in the Top 8 by the end of Round 13. During this time, the Gold Coast added Warriors centre Konrad Hurrell to their roster, as well as former Parramatta hooker Nathan Peats, who was forced out of his former club due to the club's ongoing salary cap scandal. On 3 August, the club ultimately made up for the reneging of Daly Cherry Evans by signing two-time Dally M medal winner and cross code superstar Jarryd Hayne, who was available to play for the club immediately and was signed until 2017. By Round 26's end, the Gold Coast won 11 games, drew 1 and lost 12, earning 27 premiership points in total. This allowed the club to return to the NRL Finals for the first time since 2010, after the 9th-placed Wests Tigers lost 52–10 to the Canberra Raiders. The men from the glitter strip played the Brisbane Broncos in a controversial elimination final on 10 September and were knocked out 44–28, ending their 2016 season.

2017 was a year to forget for Gold Coast as they finished 15th on the table at the end of the season. Star recruit Kevin Proctor was stripped of his co-captaincy responsibilities in May after allegations relating to drug use while in camp with the Kiwis and Hayne's ankle injury and shifting between fullback and centre became a distraction more than a solution. There was also the ongoing feud between coach Neil Henry and Hayne which resulted in Henry's tenure coming to an end after their Round 24 loss to Parramatta. To make matters worse, the Titans suffered their heaviest loss to date, losing to the Broncos 54–0 at Robina Stadium.

On 18 October 2017, Gold Coast appointed Garth Brennan as their new coach. At the end of 2017, Jarryd Hayne left the club to rejoin Parramatta for the 2018 season ending one of the most turbulent times in the club's history.

Before the 2018 NRL season began most experts predicted Gold Coast to be contending for the wooden spoon come season's end but the club shocked many critics after winning three of their first five matches. Gold Coast then went on an inconsistent run of form and ended finishing 14th on the table at the end of the regular season.

Gold Coast started the 2019 NRL season badly with the club losing the first four matches before finally recording a victory in round 5 against Penrith. On 14 July 2019, Gold Coast head coach Garth Brennan was terminated by the club following a 24–2 loss against Penrith which left them rooted to the bottom of the table. In the aftermath of Brennan's termination, Gold Coast CEO Dennis Watt refuted claims that the struggling club would be relocated to Brisbane saying "For the benefit of Titans Members, fans and sponsors, here are the facts: We are the Gold Coast Titans, and that is how we will stay". Watt later said that the appointment of the next coach would be the club's last stand saying "We're in no doubt that this is it, This is the last stand, we have to get it right, There are plenty of other people banging on the door who would probably like to launch teams elsewhere".

On 31 July 2019, Gold Coast announced that St Helens coach Justin Holbrook would be the club's new head coach starting in 2020. In Round 20 of the 2019 NRL season, the Gold Coast suffered their second heaviest defeat as a club losing 58–6 to the Sydney Roosters at the Sydney Cricket Ground. Interim head coach Craig Hodges described the loss by saying "The fear is that it is the habit they allow...that becomes acceptable for them individually whether they stay here or whether they move on to other places, And if that's what they take out of this season, if that's their legacy moving forward from this season, I think that's a terrible tragedy".

On 5 August 2019, Gold Coast co-captain Kevin Proctor wrote an open letter to the club's fans, apologizing for their performance against the Sydney Roosters. Proctor wrote "As a playing group, we were humiliated, embarrassed and appalled at the result and the way that we played as a team, I don't have any explanation for why the game panned out the way it did, It has been a hard year, and you deserve better than the results we have delivered, and we're sorry. We will not give up. We hope that you will not give up on us".

In Round 22 of the 2019 NRL season against the Parramatta Eels, the Gold Coast lost the match 36–12 at Robina Stadium which all but confirmed that the club would finish last and claim the wooden spoon with just 3 games remaining. The Gold Coast were officially handed the wooden spoon the following week as they lost 24–8 against Melbourne at the Melbourne Rectangular Stadium. The wooden spoon capped off a bad year for sport on the Gold Coast as the other team representing the region, the Gold Coast Suns, finished last in the AFL.

=== 2020–2025: Holbrook appointed, on-field inconsistency, Hasler appointed ===
At the start of the 2020 NRL season, the Gold Coast lost their first three matches before defeating the Wests Tigers 28–23 at Lang Park. The victory was the club's first win in 364 days.

The Gold Coast improved significantly in Holbrook's first season, finishing in 9th position, the club's best finish since 2016. The club finished the season with a five game win streak over St. George Illawarra, Canterbury-Bankstown, Brisbane, Manly-Warringah and Newcastle; however, only one of those wins were against a team who made the finals. They also had close losses against Penrith (who finished 1st) and the Sydney Roosters (who finished 4th).

The club recruited heavily for the 2021 NRL season, securing the signings of forwards David Fifita, Tino Fa'asuamaleaui and Herman Ese'ese.

In the 2021 NRL season, the club secured 8th position with a 44–0 victory over New Zealand on the last day of the regular season, the best in club history. The Gold Coast reached the finals after highly unlikely circumstances after going into the final round in 11th place. The club needed both Cronulla-Sutherland and Canberra to lose their matches and they were also required to win their match over New Zealand by more than 12 points.

In week one of the 2021 Finals Series, the Gold Coast played in the elimination final against the Sydney Roosters where they lost 25–24 ending their season. Following the conclusion of the 2021 NRL season, Gold Coast CEO Steve Mitchell declared the club would be launching a strategic plan over the next nine years which included the club winning two premierships by 2030 and having sold out crowds for every home game at Robina Stadium with every seat being allocated to a member of the club. The statement was considered bold by sections of the media given the fact that no Gold Coast team had ever reached a grand final before and that the club also had the lowest number of memberships in the NRL.

The Gold Coast started the 2022 NRL season looking to build on 2021 and make back to back finals appearances for the first time since 2010. However, the Gold Coast would only win two of their opening four matches and then went on to lose 16 of their next 18 games. By round 20, the Gold Coast sat bottom of the table and were in danger of claiming another wooden spoon; however, the club would win three of their last four matches to finish 13th on the table.

In round 8 of the 2023 NRL season, the Gold Coast side lead newly admitted Dolphins 26–0 but ended up losing the match 28–26 which equalled the biggest comeback in premiership history. On 22 June 2023, the Gold Coast announced that they had terminated Holbrook's position as head coach and replaced him with Des Hasler who would start as the new head coach in 2024. The club made the decision despite the side sitting just one place outside the top eight. After the termination of Holbrook's contact, the club would only go on to win two of their remaining ten matches to finish 14th on the table. The club capped off a difficult season by defeating Canterbury 34–30.

The Gold Coast started the 2024 NRL season poorly losing their opening five matches. The Gold Coast were the first team in 22 years and just the third in NRL history to concede 28 points in eight straight games after losing 30–14 to the Dolphins in round 4. The Gold Coast would go on to lose their opening six matches which was the most losses to start a season since Parramatta in 2018 and South Sydney in 2006. In round 8, the Gold Coast would record their first win of the year upsetting the Warriors 27–24 in Auckland. In round 16, the Gold Coast defeated the Warriors 66–6. It was the club's biggest-ever victory and the biggest victory of any Gold Coast side since the first one entered the competition back in 1988. The Gold Coast also recorded the biggest victory by a team running last across the 114-year history of top-flight rugby league in Australia. The Gold Coast would finish the 2024 season in 14th place on the table.

In the 2025 NRL season, the Gold Coast spent the majority of the year at the bottom of the table. Towards the end of the season it was announced that Des Hasler would be departing the club with Josh Hannay being his replacement in 2026. In the final round of the season, Gold Coast were down 28–10 at half-time against the Wests Tigers knowing that they had to win if they wanted to avoid the wooden spoon. The Gold Coast would go on to win 36–28 and jump ahead of Newcastle due to a better for and against record. Newcastle would lose the following day against Parramatta 66–10 which meant the Gold Coast avoided the wooden spoon. The Gold Coast had some of the worst defensive statistics of the year including that they conceded 24 points or more in 16 matches.

In round 1 of the 2026 NRL season, the Gold Coast got off to the worst possible start under Hannay's reign losing 50-10 against Cronulla. The Gold Coast would finish the 2026 season in 16th place just two points ahead of wooden spooners St. George Illawarra.

== Season summaries ==
P=Premier, R=Runner-up, M=Minor Premier, F=Finals Appearance, W=Wooden Spoon, (Brackets represent Finals games)
Competition	Games Played	Games Won	Games Drawn	Games Lost	Ladder Position	P	R	M	F	W	Coach(es)	Captain(s)	Details
2007 NRL season	24	10	0	14	12 / 16						John Cartwright	Luke Bailey; Scott Prince	2007 Gold Coast Titans season
2008 NRL season	24	10	0	14	13 / 16						John Cartwright	Luke Bailey; Scott Prince; Preston Campbell	2008 Gold Coast Titans season
2009 NRL season	24 (2)	16	0	8 (2)	3 / 16				♦		John Cartwright	Luke Bailey; Scott Prince	2009 Gold Coast Titans season
2010 NRL season	24 (2)	15 (1)	0	9 (1)	4 / 16				♦		John Cartwright	Luke Bailey; Scott Prince	2010 Gold Coast Titans season
2011 NRL season	24	6	0	18	16 / 16					♦	John Cartwright	Luke Bailey; Scott Prince; Preston Campbell	2011 Gold Coast Titans season
2012 NRL season	24	10	0	14	12 / 16						John Cartwright	Luke Bailey; Scott Prince; William Zillman	2012 Gold Coast Titans season
2013 NRL season	24	11	0	13	9 / 16						John Cartwright	Greg Bird; Nate Myles; Luke Bailey; William Zillman	2013 Gold Coast Titans season
2014 NRL season	24	9	0	15	14 / 16						John Cartwright; Neil Henry	Greg Bird; Nate Myles; Luke Bailey; William Zillman	2014 Gold Coast Titans season
2015 NRL season	24	9	0	15	14 / 16						Neil Henry	Nate Myles; Luke Douglas; William Zillman; David Mead	2015 Gold Coast Titans season
2016 NRL season	24 (1)	11	1	12 (1)	8 / 16				♦		Neil Henry	Greg Bird; William Zillman; Luke Douglas	2016 Gold Coast Titans season
2017 NRL season	24	7	0	17	15 / 16						Neil Henry; Craig Hodges; Terry Matterson	Ryan James; Kevin Proctor; Nathan Peats	2017 Gold Coast Titans season
2018 NRL season	24	8	0	16	14 / 16						Garth Brennan	Ryan James; Nathan Peats	2018 Gold Coast Titans season
2019 NRL season	24	4	0	20	16 / 16					♦	Garth Brennan; Luke Burt; Craig Hodges	Ryan James; Tyrone Roberts, Kevin Proctor	2019 Gold Coast Titans season
2020 NRL season	20	9	0	11	9 / 16						Justin Holbrook	Ryan James; Kevin Proctor	2020 Gold Coast Titans season
2021 NRL season	24 (1)	10	0	14 (1)	8 / 16				♦		Justin Holbrook	Kevin Proctor; Jamal Fogarty	2021 Gold Coast Titans season
2022 NRL season	24	6	0	18	13 / 16						Justin Holbrook	Tino Fa'asuamaleaui	2022 Gold Coast Titans season
2023 NRL season	24	9	0	15	14 / 17						Justin Holbrook; Jim Lenihan	Tino Fa'asuamaleaui	2023 Gold Coast Titans season
2024 NRL season	24	9	0	15	14 / 17						Des Hasler	Tino Fa'asuamaleaui Rd1–3; Kieran Foran Rd4–10, 13–27; Moeaki Fotuaika Rd11–12	2024 Gold Coast Titans season
2025 NRL season	24	6	0	18	16 / 17						Des Hasler	Tino Fa'asuamaleaui	2025 Gold Coast Titans season
2026 NRL season	24	6	0	18	16/17						Josh Hannay	Tino Fa'asuamaleaui Moeaki Fotuaika	2026 Gold Coast Titans season

== Emblem and colours ==
Although they were accepted into the National Rugby League, they were without a name after dropping "Dolphins" in order to avoid legal action from the Redcliffe Dolphins. The consortium aligned themselves with Gold Coast Radio Station 90.9 Sea FM, and set up a competition in which listeners could submit possible names for the new team. This was shortlisted into ten names, which through online voting was shortened to three: Titans, Stingers and Pirates. Online voting continued, with team being branded as the Gold Coast Titans on 21 September 2005. After the team name was chosen, fans were given six jerseys to vote for on the club's website, with option 6 ultimately being successful.

In October 2021, Gold Coast Titans launched a new look to take the young club into the future.The re-designed logo brought in the Titans' core colours that were designed to reflect the Gold Coast home and modernises the iconic emblem. The contemporary logo shows a steely determination, reflective of the ambitions of the Titans players, coaches and staff. It was the club's first rebrand since admittance into the competition in 2007.

== Stadium ==
For their first season in the National Rugby League, the Titans played out of Carrara Stadium on Nerang-Broadbeach Road, while their 27,000-seat stadium in Robina was being completed. Carrara Stadium was cited as one of the main reasons the Gold Coast bid was rejected in their first attempt to rejoin the NRL, due to the fact that Carrara only seated around 16,000, and was an oval.

Work on the new stadium commenced at the end of 2005, and the facility was ready for play before the start of the 2008 NRL season. The project was managed by the same company that constructed Lang Park, the Gabba, and Stadium Australia—the Sydney 2000 Olympic Stadium. The new stadium has a current (2024) capacity of 27,690—2,690 more than originally planned for.

== Titans TV ==
The Gold Coast Titans operate a TV channel, Titans TV, that serves the Gold Coast area and is carried by Foxtel on the Gold Coast. Its main programming features match highlights and player biographies.

== Players ==
Although other players may play for the Gold Coast Titans during the year, all NRL clubs are required to select a top 25 First Grade squad at the beginning of the season. Below is the list of their first grade players.

Gold Coast Titans 2026 squad
Top 30 squad - 2026 NRL season			Supplementary list	Coaching staff
Cooper Bai – LK; AJ Brimson (vc) – FE, CE; Jayden Campbell – HB; Adam Christensen – SR; Jaylan De Groot – FB; Tino Fa'asuamaleaui (c) – PR; Siale Faeamani – WG; Max Feagai – CE; Beau Fermor – SR; Jojo Fifita – CE	Allan Fitzgibbon – WG; Moeaki Fotuaika – PR; Tony Francis – WG; Brock Gray – PR; Klese Haas – PR; Zane Harrison – HB; Arama Hau – SR; Lachlan Ilias – FE, HB; Jaimin Jolliffe – PR, LK; Keano Kini – FB	Jett Liu – PR; Kurtis Morrin – PR; Josh Patston – SR; Chris Randall – LK; Phillip Sami – WG; Tukimihia Simpkins – PR; Luke Sommerton – HK; Jensen Taumoepeau – WG; Sam Verrills – HK	Jai Bilish – HK; Dean Ieremia – WG; Sunny Kama – CE; Oliver Pascoe – HK	Head coach: Josh Hannay; Assistant coaches: Brian McDermott; Brad Davis; Steve Murphy; Legend: (c) Captain(s); (vc) Vice-captain(s); Updated: 22 November 2026; Source(s): Titans Team Profiles

== 2027 signings/transfers ==
=== Gains ===
- Mawene Hiroti from Cronulla-Sutherland
- Luke Hanson from New Zealand Warriors
- Will Brough from Leigh Leopards

=== Losses ===
- Allan Fitzgibbon Released
- Jaimin Jolliffe to Huddersfield Giants
- Phillip Sami to St. George Illawarra Dragons
- Tukimihia Simpkins Released
- Sam Verrills Released

== Coaches ==
There have been 9 coaches of the Titans since their first season in 2007. The current coach is Josh Hannay.

No	Name	Seasons	Games	Wins	Draws	Losses	Win %	Premiers	Runners-up	Minor premiers	Wooden spoons	Notes
1	John Cartwright	2007−2014	192	87	0	105	45.3%	—	—	—	2011	Club's first finals appearance in 2009; Sacked mid-season 2014
2	Neil Henry	2014−2017	75	28	1	46	37.3%	—	—	—	—	Sacked mid-season 2017
3	Craig Hodges	2017, 2019	10	0	0	10	0%	—	—	—	2019	Caretaker coach
4	Terry Matterson	2017	2	0	0	2	0%	—	—	—	—	Caretaker coach
5	Garth Brennan	2018−2019	40	12	0	28	30%	—	—	—	—	Sacked mid-season 2019
6	Luke Burt	2019	8	0	0	8	0%	—	—	—	2019	Caretaker coach
7	Justin Holbrook	2020−2023	81	30	0	51	37%	—	—	—	—	Sacked mid-season 2023
8	Jim Lenihan	2023	11	3	0	8	27%	—	—	—	—	Caretaker coach
9	Des Hasler	2024−2025	48	14	0	34	29%	—	—	—	—	Sacked end of season 2025
10	Josh Hannay	2026−present	11	2	0	9	18.1%	—	—	—	—	Current coach

== Player stats ==
=== Most tries ===
(as of round 25, 2026)

Tries	Player	Period
86	Phillip Sami	2017–2026
85	Anthony Don	2013−2021
67	David Mead	2009−2016
58	Kevin Gordon	2009−2015
53	Alofiana Khan-Pereira	2023−2025
44	Brian Kelly	2017−2025
42	William Zillman	2009−2017

=== Most points ===
(as of round 10, 2026)

Points	Player	T	G	FG
719	Scott Prince	32	293	5
365	Aidan Sezer	12	156	5
342	Anthony Don	85	1	0
327	Ashley Taylor	16	130	3
324	Phillip Sami	83	0	0

(*) player still active in the Gold Coast Titans team.

=== Most games ===
(as of round 27, 2026)

Games	Player	Period
187	Moeaki Fotuaika	2018−present
173	Mark Minichiello	2007−2014
151	William Zillman	2009−2017
150	Luke Bailey	2007−2014
147	David Mead	2009−2016
144	Ryan James	2010−2019

== Team Stats ==
=== Win-Loss Records ===
Opponent	Played	Won	Drawn	Lost	Win %
Tigers	30	18	0	12	60.00
Eels	28	14	0	14	50.00
Sea Eagles	31	14	0	17	45.16
Bulldogs	27	12	0	15	44.44
Knights	34	15	0	19	44.18
Warriors	38	15	0	23	39.47
Raiders	34	13	0	21	38.24
Dragons	34	13	0	21	38.24
Cowboys	37	13	0	24	35.14
Broncos	41	14	0	27	34.15
Roosters	27	9	0	18	33.33
Panthers	27	8	0	19	29.63
Sharks	31	9	1	21	29.03
Rabbitohs	25	6	0	19	24.00
Storm	30	7	0	23	23.33
Dolphins	8	1	0	7	12.50

== Honours ==
=== Club ===
- Premierships: Nil
- Minor Premierships: Nil
- Finals series: 2009, 2010, 2016, 2021
- Wooden Spoons: 2011, 2019
- XXXX Derby: 2024

=== Individual ===
The Paul Broughton Medal, a 400 gram pure titanium medal, is awarded annually to the Titans' best and fairest player for the season. 'The Preston' is named in honour of foundation player Preston Campbell and is presented to the player who truly embodies what it is to be a Titan.

Year	Paul Broughton Medal	Clubman of the Year	Community Award	'The Preston'	Rookie of the Year	Coach's Award	U/20s Player of the Year	Members' MVP Award	Source
2007	Luke Bailey; Anthony Laffranchi	Brad Meyers	Preston Campbell	-	Shannon Walker	-	-	-	
2008	Preston Campbell	Michael Hodgson	Chris Walker	-	Jordan Rankin	-	Esi Tonga	-	
2009	Nathan Friend	Luke O'Dwyer	Preston Campbell	-	Kevin Gordon	Nathan Friend	Kayne Lawton	-	
2010	Luke Bailey	Preston Campbell	William Zillman	-	Bodene Thompson	Mat Rogers	Matt Srama	-	
2011	Luke Bailey	Luke Bailey	Kevin Gordon	-	Matt Srama	Preston Campbell	Jordan Rankin	-	
2012	Nate Myles	Matt Srama	Brenton Lawrence	David Mead	Aidan Sezer	Nate Myles	Sam Irwin	-	
2013	Greg Bird	-	Luke Douglas	William Zillman	Anthony Don	Greg Bird	Matt Beddow	-	
2014	Beau Falloon	-	Ryan James	Luke Bailey	Paul Carter	Luke Bailey	Anthony Colman	-	
2015	Luke Douglas	-	Ben Ridge	Anthony Don	Kane Elgey	James Roberts	Shaun Hudson	-	
2016	Ryan James	-	Darren Robb	Matt Srama/Kane Elgey	Ashley Taylor	Zeb Taia	Max King	-	
2017	Anthony Don	-	Konrad Hurrell	Konrad Hurrell	Morgan Boyle	Nathan Peats	Alexander Brimson	-	
2018	Ryan James	-	-	Ryan James	Alexander Brimson	Michael Gordon	-	Anthony Don	
2019	Moeaki Fotuaika	-	Tyrone Roberts	Michael Gordon	Jai Whitbread	Jai Arrow	-	Jai Arrow	
2020	Brian Kelly	-	-	Dale Copley	Jaimin Jolliffe	Jamal Fogarty	-	AJ Brimson	
2021	Tino Fa'asuamaleaui	-	-	Jamal Fogarty	Jayden Campbell	Corey Thompson	-	Tino Fa'asuamaleaui	
2022	Tino Fa'asuamaleaui	-	-	Brian Kelly	Jojo Fifita	AJ Brimson	-	AJ Brimson	
2023	Moeaki Fotuaika	-	-	Steph Hancock	Alofiana Khan-Pereira	Chris Randall	-	David Fifita	
2024	Keano Kini	-	-	Jaime Chapman	Josiah Pahulu	Brian Kelly	-	Jayden Campbell	
2025	AJ Brimson	-	-	Kieran Foran	Josh Patston	-	-	Jayden Campbell	

== Sponsorship ==
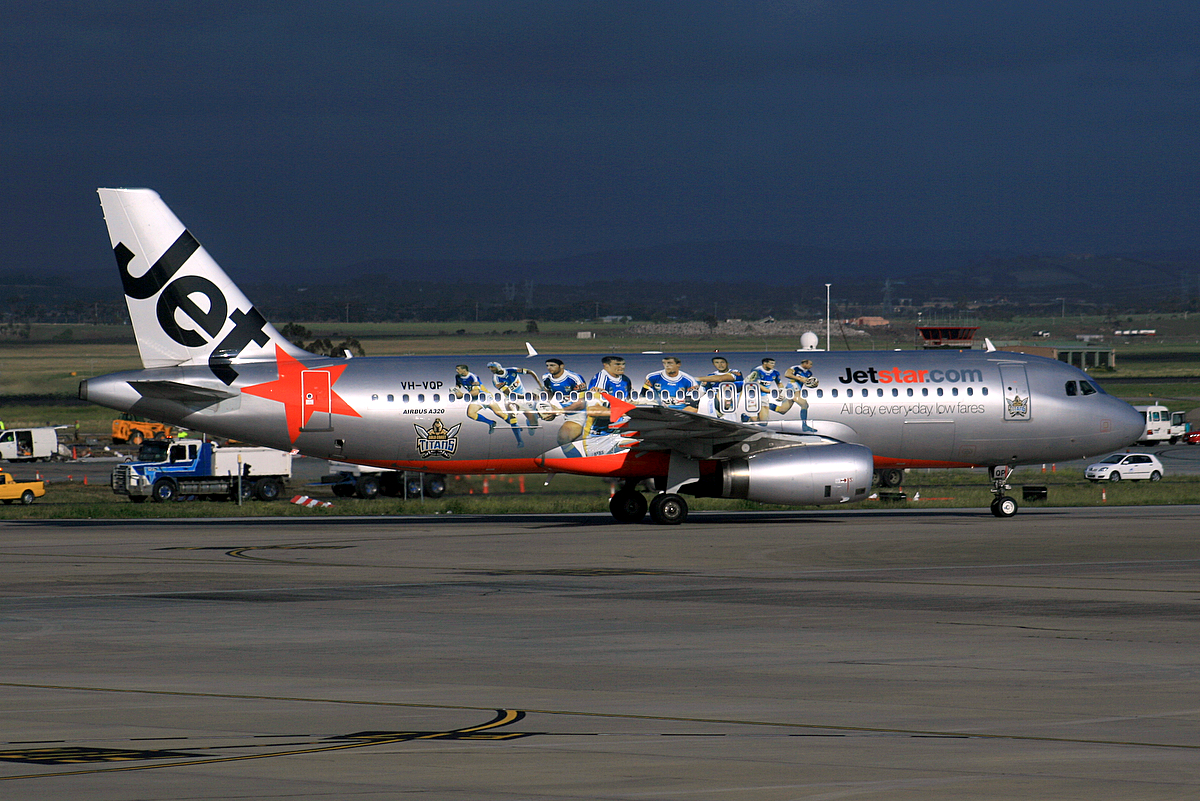
One of Jetstars' Airbus A320s had Titans badges and large images of several Titans players on both sides of the fuselage

James Frizelle's Automotive Group & Audi Centre Gold Coast, a local car dealership, signed on as the first major sponsorship partner for the franchise, with a deal lasting three years.

The Gold Coast Titans officially became the "Jetstar Gold Coast Titans", on 20 September 2006, with the announcement of a five-year multimillion-dollar naming rights sponsorship with Jetstar.

Later in 2006 Castlemaine Perkins, brewer of XXXX beer, signed a five-year sponsorship agreement with the Titans. Using the XXXX Bitter brand, Castlemaine Perkins is now a Platinum Sponsor of the Titans.

In 2024, The Lottery Office became the new principal sponsorship partner of the Titans.

=== Manufacturers ===
- 2007–2009: Reebok
- 2010–2013: Adidas
- 2014–2016: BLK
- 2017–2018: Classic
- 2019–present: Dynasty Sport

=== Naming rights ===
- 2007–2012: Jetstar
- 2013–2014: iSelect
- 2015–2017: Aquis
- 2018: TFH Hire
- 2019–2021: NEDS betting
- 2024–present: The Lottery Office

=== Chest sponsors ===
- 2007–2011: Jetstar
- 2012–2014: iSelect
- 2015–2017: Aquis
- 2018: TFH Hire
- 2019–2021: NEDS betting
- 2024–present: The Lottery Office

=== Back sponsors ===
- 2007: Marina Quays (Top) / Australian Gas & Power (Bottom)
- 2008: Marina Quays (Top) / Australian Gas & Power (Bottom)
- 2009: Marina Quays (Top) / Australian Gas & Power (Bottom)
- 2010: Australian Gas & Power (Bottom)
- 2011: Australian Gas & Power (Top) / ThyssenKrupp Elevator (Bottom)
- 2012: iSelect (Top) / Learn Earn Legend (Bottom)
- 2013: Illuminated Water (Top) / BetEzy (Bottom)
- 2014: Global Road Technology (Top) / BetEzy (Bottom)
- 2015: Global Road Technology (Top) / Jabbry.com (Bottom)
- 2016: TripADeal (Top) / Ladbrokes (Bottom)
- 2017: TripADeal (Top) / Ladbrokes (Bottom)
- 2018: TripADeal (Top) / MP Commercial Logistics(Bottom)
- 2019: TripADeal (Top) / Orbitz Elevators (Bottom)
- 2020: Village Roadshow Theme Parks (Top) / Orbitz Elevators (Bottom)
- 2021: Village Roadshow Theme Parks (Top) / MyPayNow (Bottom)
- 2022: Village Roadshow Theme Parks (Top) / Evolve Legal (Bottom)
- 2023: Village Roadshow Theme Parks (Top) / Chempro (Bottom)

=== Sleeve sponsors ===
- 2007–2010: ABC Brick Sales
- 2011–2014: Coral Homes
- 2016: Ladbrokes
- 2017–2018: TripADeal
- 2019–2020: TFH Hire
- 2021–present: emoney

=== Shorts sponsors ===
- 2007: DTBS (Front) / Harvey Norman (Back)
- 2008–2011: Professional Investment Services (Front) / Harvey Norman (Back)
- 2012: Audi Centre Gold Coast (Home) / Jetstar (Away) / Harvey Norman (Back)
- 2013–2014: Hyundai (Front) / Zarraffas Coffee (Back)
- 2015: LEDified (Back)
- 2016–2017: Frizelles (Front) / LEDified (Back)
- 2019: Frizelle Sunshine (Front) / NEDS betting (Back)
- 2020–present: Harcourts Coastal (Front) / Coral Homes (Back)

== Supporters ==
The official Gold Coast Titans supporter group is known as "The Legion". The Legion was formed in late 2006 via the Titans online forum. The Legion was founded during the Panthers pre season 2007 trial match with three fans (Brad Newman, Steve Lippis and Dennis Mulheron) in attendance under the Northern goal posts at Carrara Stadium. The trio gained support from other fans and the Legion started to get momentum and numbers. They continued to congregate under the Northern goal posts for several years until the Legion were moved to the Eastern stand at Robina Stadium and now those core group Legion members are known as "The Legion Frontline". Since entering the competition, the Gold Coast have recorded the lowest number of memberships out of all the NRL teams on a yearly basis.

On 10 March 2020, the Titans officially embraced the name "Legion" for the entire Titans fanbase. It was decided that "The Legion" was the perfect fit for this purpose—for its symbolic reference to military and gladiatorial strength, as well as a rallying call for Titans supporters to "Join our Legion".

Home crowd figures

Season	Members	Home Attendance	Difference from previous season
2007	-	21,489	—
2008	-	21,618	▲129
2009	-	19,178	▼2440
2010	5,400	17,877	▼1301
2011	8,560	15,428	▼2449
2012	7,500	14,405	▼1023
2013	7,228	14,028	▼377
2014	8,284	13,194	▼834
2015	11,508	11,236	▼1958
2016	10,278	13,798	▲2562
2017	10,914	13,370	▼428
2018	6,792	14,556	▲1186
2019	6,517	10,726	▼3830
2020	7,836	4,604 (Covid)	▼6122
2021	N/A	14,420	▲9816
2022	11,000	15,184	▲764
2023	13,124	19,536	▲4352
2024	16,041	17,956	▼1580
As of 2023

Notable fans

- Michael Caton, TV personality
- Joel Parkinson, Australian surfer
- Margot Robbie, Actress
- Samantha Stosur, Australian tennis player
- Bernard Tomic, German-born Australian tennis player
- Kenny Wallace, Australian canoeist

Cheer squad

- The Gold Coast Hogs Breath Cafe Sirens are the cheerleading squad for the Gold Coast Titans.

== Feeder clubs ==
Since joining the National Rugby League for Season 2007, the Titans have aligned themselves with three Queensland Cup clubs:

- Tweed Heads Seagulls (Current)
- Burleigh Bears (former)
- Ipswich Jets (Current)

In 2009, the Burleigh Bears linked with the Brisbane Broncos. However, by the end of the year this arrangement was cancelled, and the Bears re-linked with the Titans.

During preseason before the 2017 NRL season, the Gold Coast Titans announced the new affiliation with the Central Queensland Capras

In 2023, the Burleigh Bears aligned themselves with the Brisbane Broncos for 2024–26. cancelling this arrangement with Titans, ending their 14-year affiliation. Later in the year the Ipswich Jets announced an affiliation with the Titans for their 2024 season.

== Netball ==
In December 2021 it was announced that Gold Coast Titans would enter a team in the 2022 Sapphire Series.
