= Allan Fitzgibbon (rugby league, born 1998) =

Australian professional rugby league player

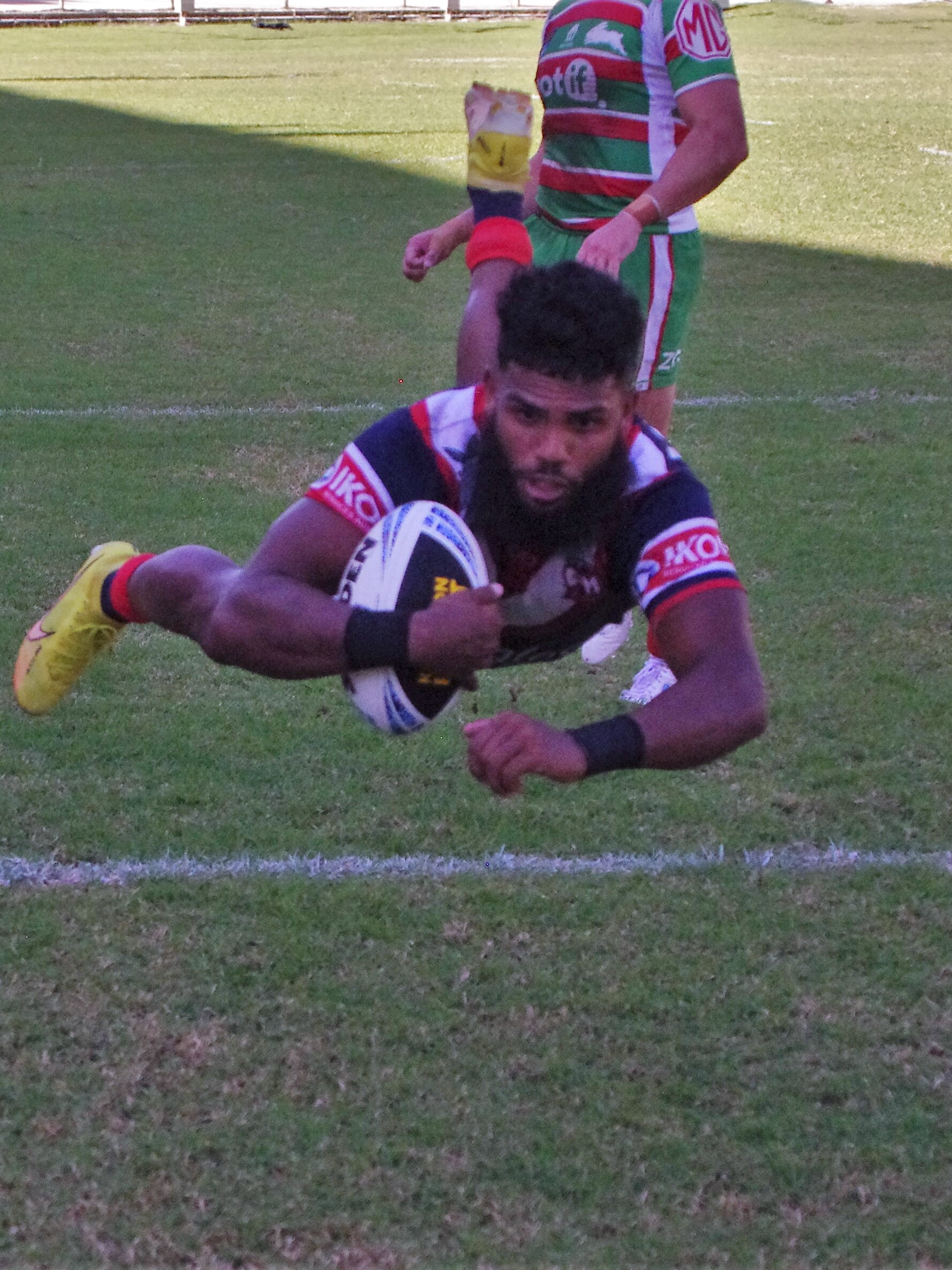

Personal information
- Full name: Allan Fitzgibbon
- Born: 10 November 1998 (age 27) Coffs Harbour, New South Wales, Australia

Playing information
- Position: Wing
Club
Years	Team	Pld	T	G	FG	P
2025–26	Gold Coast Titans	6	2	0	0	8
- Source: As of 20 August 2025

Allan Fitzgibbon (born 10 November 1998) is an Australian rugby league footballer who last played as a winger for the Gold Coast Titans in the National Rugby League.

== Background ==
Fizgibbon was born in Coffs Harbour and is of Indigenous Australian descent from the Dunghutti and Bundjalung people.

He attended Patrician Brothers' College, Fairfield before being signed by the Penrith Panthers.

== Playing career ==
=== Early career ===
In 2018, Fitzgibbon was a member of Penrith's Jersey Flegg Cup squad but spent the season playing for St Marys Saints in the Sydney Shield and Ron Massey Cup. In 2019, he played three games for the Panthers' NSW Cup side, scoring three tries.

After spending time in the Australia rugby sevens system, he returned to rugby league in 2021, joining the Wests Tigers, playing for the Western Suburbs Magpies in the NSW Cup. He was released by the Tigers in June 2021 after a domestic violence charge.

In 2023, Fitzgibbon joined the Sydney Roosters NSW Cup team before moving to the North Sydney Bears halfway through the season. In 2024, he scored a try in the Bears' NSW Cup Grand Final loss to the Newtown Jets.

=== 2025 ===
Fitzgibbon joined the Gold Coast Titans on a development contract for the 2025 season, starting the season playing for the Ipswich Jets in the Queensland Cup.

In Round 6 of the 2025 NRL season, he made his NRL debut in the Titans' 38–16 loss to the St George Illawarra Dragons.

=== 2026 ===
Fitzgibbon was one of five players released by the Gold Coast Titans at the end of their 2026 season.
