= Paul Broughton =

Australian rugby league footballer and coach (1931–2022)

Paul Broughton OAM
Personal information
- Born: 31 March 1931 Australia
- Died: 3 December 2022 (aged 91)

Playing information
- Position: Five-eighth, lock
Club
Years	Team	Pld	T	G	FG	P
1954	St. George	7	1	0	0	3
1957	Balmain	1	0	0	0	0
	Total	8	1	0	0	3

Coaching information
Club
Years	Team	Gms	W	D	L	W%
1974	Past Brothers	24	12	1	11	50
1975–76	Balmain	45	22	2	21	49
1977–78	Newtown	27	2	0	25	7
	Total	96	36	3	57	38

Paul Broughton OAM (31 March 1931 – 3 December 2022) was an Australian rugby league footballer, coach and club chief executive. He was the Chairman of the Gold Coast Titans in the NRL. He also served on the board of the North Queensland Cowboys. He has been described by some as an Australian rugby league football identity.

== Playing career ==
Broughton was graded at St. George in 1952, and captained the team to the Third Grade premiership in 1953. He played in Sydney's First Grade NSWRFL Premiership for St. George in the 1954 season before playing with Corrimal as captain/coach. He played 44 grade games for St. George in all grades (1952-1954).

Broughton returned to the Sydney Premiership in 1957 with Balmain but was injured in the first match of the season and forced into retirement.

== Coaching career ==
Post-playing Broughton coached the St. George Dragons in third grade and reserve grade (three premierships 1962–1964) and went on to become the club's chairman of selectors in 1968. He later worked for the NSWRFL before a season coaching Brisbane's Brothers club in 1974. The following season Broughton returned to Sydney with the Balmain club, whom he coached from 1975 to 1976, then Newtown from 1977 to the fifth game of 1978, after which a major internal upheaval caused him, along with reserve grade coach Dave Bolton, to be dismissed in favour of St. George legend (and ex-Jet) Johnny Raper and Bob Carnegie.

After coaching Broughton worked as New South Wales Rugby League development officer.

Following the removal of the Gold Coast Chargers from the newly established National Rugby League at the end of the 1998 season, Broughton worked towards the foundation of the Titans, and has been described as "the Godfather of Gold Coast rugby league". The Titans annual award for best and fairest player is named the Paul Broughton Medal in his honour.

== Personal life and death ==
Broughton received the Medal of the Order of Australia (OAM) in the 2017 Queen's Birthday Honours "for services to rugby league, and to the community." He died in December 2022, at the age of 91.
