= Riley Brown =

Australian rugby league footballer

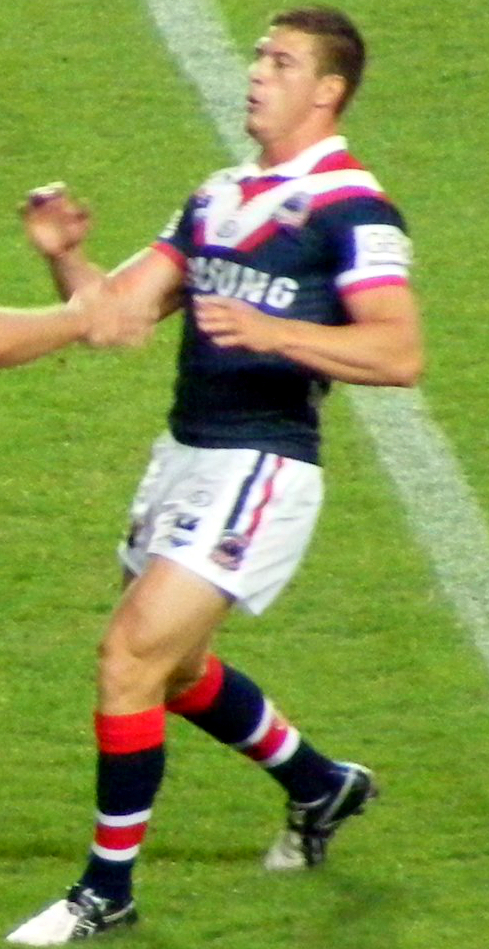

Personal information
- Full name: Riley Brown
- Born: 15 October 1984 (age 42) Bundaberg, Queensland, Australia
- Height: 185 cm (6 ft 1 in)
- Weight: 99 kg (15 st 8 lb)

Playing information
- Position: Second-row, Hooker, Five-eighth
Club
Years	Team	Pld	T	G	FG	P
2004–07	Newcastle Knights	40	7	0	0	28
2008–09	Sydney Roosters	27	0	0	0	0
2010–11	Gold Coast Titans	9	0	0	0	0
	Total	76	7	0	0	28
Representative
Years	Team	Pld	T	G	FG	P
2004	NSW Residents	1	1	0	0	4
- Source: As of 8 January 2024

Riley Brown (born 15 October 1984) is an Australian former professional rugby league footballer who last played for the Gold Coast Titans in the National Rugby League (NRL). He primarily played as a Hooker.

== Background ==
Brown was born in Bundaberg, Queensland. He was raised in the town of Singleton, New South Wales where, at 17 years of age, he represented Singleton Greyhounds at first team level.

== Playing career ==
Brown made his NRL debut on 4 April 2004, for the Newcastle Knights against the St George Illawarra Dragons at WIN Stadium. Brown made seven appearances for Newcastle the following season as the club finished last on the table claiming the wooden spoon.

After playing 40 games for the Newcastle club, Brown was told to look elsewhere after coach Brian Smith's clean-out midway through the 2007 season. Brown was signed by the Sydney Roosters for the 2008 season.

In his first game for the Sydney Roosters, Brown infamously injured South Sydney player Craig Wing in the 8th minute of the match with a shoulder charge into Wing's back while Wing was being held up by two other players. Brown was not charged over the incident.

Brown broke his arm in the Roosters' 2008 qualifying final loss to the Brisbane Broncos. He did not return to first grade until round 21 of the 2009 NRL season. Brown made a total of six appearances in 2009 as the Sydney Roosters had a horrid season on the field finishing with the wooden spoon.

Brown joined the Gold Coast Titans in 2010. Brown's last game in first grade was a 16–12 loss against Manly in Round 10 2011. At the end of 2011, Brown was released from the club as the Gold Coast finished with the wooden spoon. It was the players third wooden spoon in his career. After leaving the NRL, Brown played for the Cessnock Goannas, South Newcastle and Central Newcastle.

== Personal life ==
On 2 June 2000, Brown's mother Judith was murdered in her Anna Bay home. Brown's father, Ross, was convicted of the crime but Brown believes that his father is innocent.
