= Brian Kelly (rugby league) =

Australian rugby league footballer (born 1996)

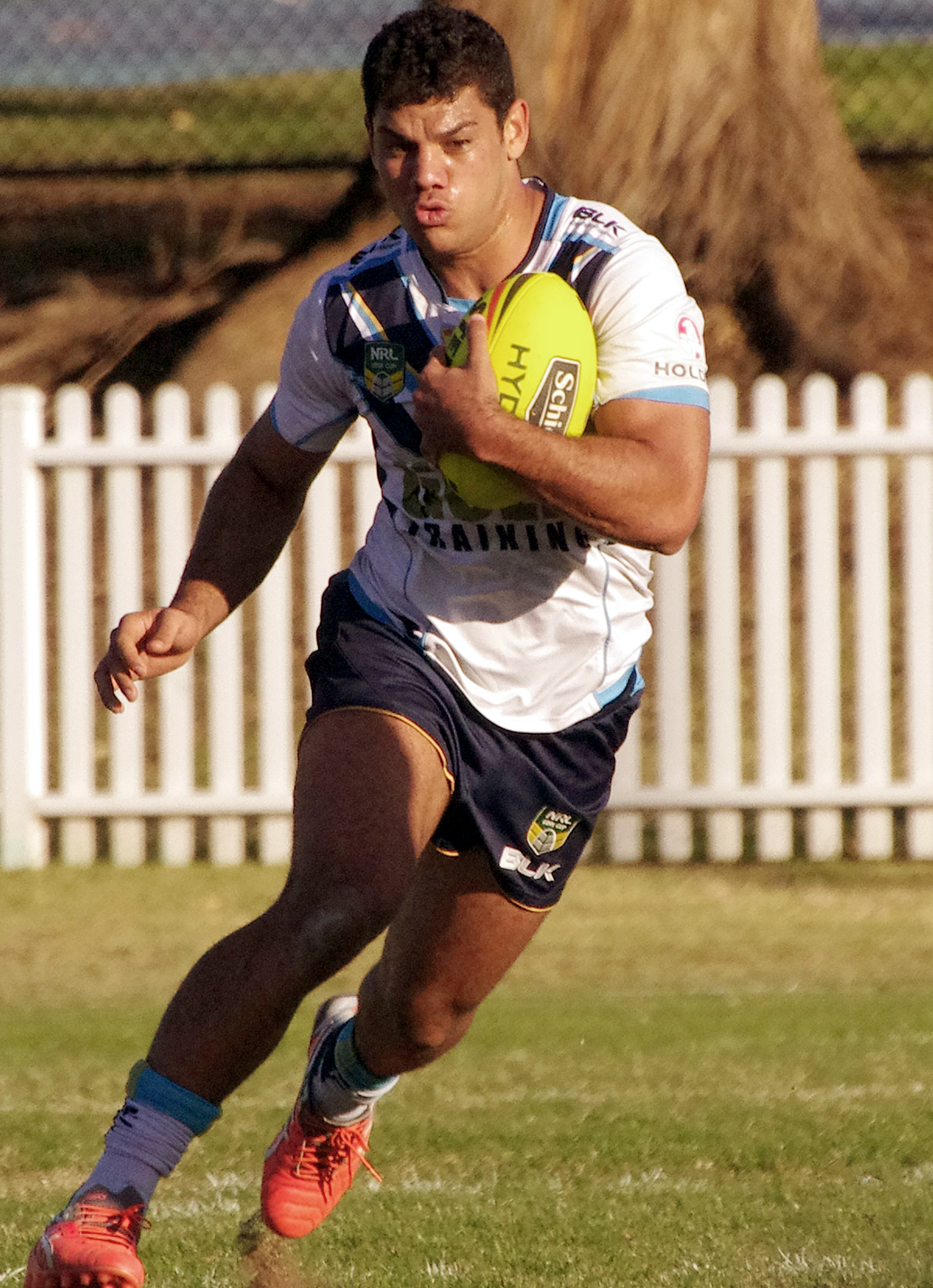

Personal information
- Born: 20 May 1996 (age 30) Lismore, New South Wales, Australia
- Height: 181 cm (5 ft 11 in)
- Weight: 94 kg (14 st 11 lb)

Playing information
- Position: Centre, Wing
Club
| Years | Team | Pld | T | G | FG | P |
|---|---|---|---|---|---|---|
| 2017–19 | Manly Sea Eagles | 47 | 15 | 0 | 0 | 60 |
| 2019–25 | Gold Coast Titans | 143 | 51 | 11 | 0 | 226 |
| 2026– | Parramatta Eels | 22 | 5 | 0 | 0 | 20 |
| | Total | 212 | 71 | 11 | 0 | 306 |
Representative
| Years | Team | Pld | T | G | FG | P |
| 2017 | Country NSW | 1 | 0 | 0 | 0 | 0 |
| 2018 | Prime Minister's XIII | 1 | 0 | 0 | 0 | 0 |
| 2024 | Indigenous All Stars | 1 | 0 | 0 | 0 | 0 |
- Source: As of 16 November 2026
- Relatives: Albert Kelly (cousin); James Roberts (cousin)

Brian Kelly (born 20 May 1996) is an Australian professional rugby league footballer who plays as a centre for the Parramatta Eels in the National Rugby League (NRL).

He played for the Manly-Warringah Sea Eagles in the NRL. Kelly played for Country NSW and the Prime Minister's XIII.

== Background ==
Kelly was born in Lismore, New South Wales, Australia. He is of Indigenous Australian descent from Bundjalung people.

He played his junior rugby league for the Ballina Seagulls and Lennox Head Dolphins. He was then signed by the Gold Coast Titans.

Kelly is a cousin of former Brisbane Broncos players Albert Kelly andJames Roberts.

== Playing career ==
=== Early career ===
From 2014 to 2016, Kelly played for the Gold Coast Titans' NYC team. In July 2015, he played for the New South Wales under-20s team against the Queensland under-20s team. In September 2015, he re-signed with the Titans on a 2-year contract until the end of 2017. In May 2016, he played for the Junior Kangaroos against the Junior Kiwis. In November 2016, he signed a 3-year contract with the Manly-Warringah Sea Eagles starting in 2017, after gaining a release from the final year of his Titans contract.

=== 2017 ===
In round 1 of the 2017 NRL season, Kelly made his NRL debut for the Sea Eagles against the Parramatta Eels, scoring a try. On 7 May, Kelly played for Country in the last City vs Country origin, starting on the left wing in a 10–20 loss at Mudgee.

=== 2018 ===
On 8 November, Kelly was released from the final year of his contract to join the Gold Coast Titans on a two-year deal.

=== 2019 ===
Kelly made a total of 23 appearances for the Gold Coast in the 2019 NRL season as the club endured a horror year on and off the field. During the halfway mark of the season, head coach Garth Brennan was sacked by the club after a string of poor results. The Gold Coast managed to win only 4 games for the entire season and finished last claiming the Wooden Spoon.

=== 2020 ===
During the 2020 COVID-19 pandemic and under new NRL biosecurity measures Kelly refused to vaccinate against the flu. He was stood down from the Titans after the Queensland Government stood by the flu vaccination measures previously agreed to by the NRL that 100% of players would be vaccinated prior to the competition restarting. He was given a last minute reprieve from suspension after agreeing to vaccinate.

=== 2021 ===
Kelly played 21 games for the Gold Coast in the 2021 NRL season including the club's elimination final loss to the Sydney Roosters.

=== 2022 ===
In round 24 of the 2022 NRL season, Kelly was sent off for a dangerous tackle in the Gold Coast's 36-26 spoon bowl match victory over Newcastle. Kelly played a total of 17 games for the Gold Coast in the 2022 season scoring seven tries as the club finished 13th on the table.

=== 2023 ===
Kelly played a total of 21 matches for the Gold Coast in the 2023 NRL season and scored six tries as the club finished 14th on the table.

=== 2024 ===
In round 6 of the 2024 NRL season, Kelly who was not a noted kicker, converted a goal from the side line to take the Gold Coast's match against Canberra into golden point extra-time. The Gold Coast would go on to lose the match 21-20 which left the club winless to start the year. Kelly played 23 games for the Gold Coast throughout the 2024 NRL season as the club finished 14th on the table.

=== 2025 ===
Kelly played 21 games for the Gold Coast in the 2025 NRL season as the club narrowly avoided the wooden spoon finishing 16th on the table.

=== 2026 ===
On 5 January, the Parramatta club announced that Kelly had signed with them on a two-year deal after being released by the Gold Coast Titans. In round 1 of the 2026 NRL season, Kelly made his club debut for Parramatta against Melbourne which ended in a 52-4 loss. Kelly played 22 games for Parramatta in the 2026 NRL season as the club finished 13th on the table. In September, Kelly was voted as Parramatta's player of the season along with Jack Williams. On 20 October 2026, the Eels announced that Kelly had re-signed with the club until the end of 2028.

== Statistics ==
| Year | Team | Games | Tries | Goals | Pts |
|---|---|---|---|---|---|
| 2017 | Manly Warringah Sea Eagles | 23 | 8 | | 32 |
| 2018 | Manly Warringah Sea Eagles | 24 | 7 | | 28 |
| 2019 | Gold Coast Titans | 23 | 8 | | 32 |
| 2020 | Gold Coast Titans | 16 | 6 | | 24 |
| 2021 | Gold Coast Titans | 22 | 12 | | 48 |
| 2022 | Gold Coast Titans | 17 | 7 | | 28 |
| 2023 | Gold Coast Titans | 21 | 6 | | 24 |
| 2024 | Gold Coast Titans | 23 | 5 | 10 | 40 |
| 2025 | Gold Coast Titans | 21 | 7 | 1 | 40 |
| 2026 | Parramatta Eels | 22 | 5 | | 20 |
| 2027 | Parramatta Eels | | | | |
| | Totals | 212 | 71 | 11 | 306 |

*denotes season competing
