= Willis Meehan =

New Zealand-Australian rugby league footballer and boxer

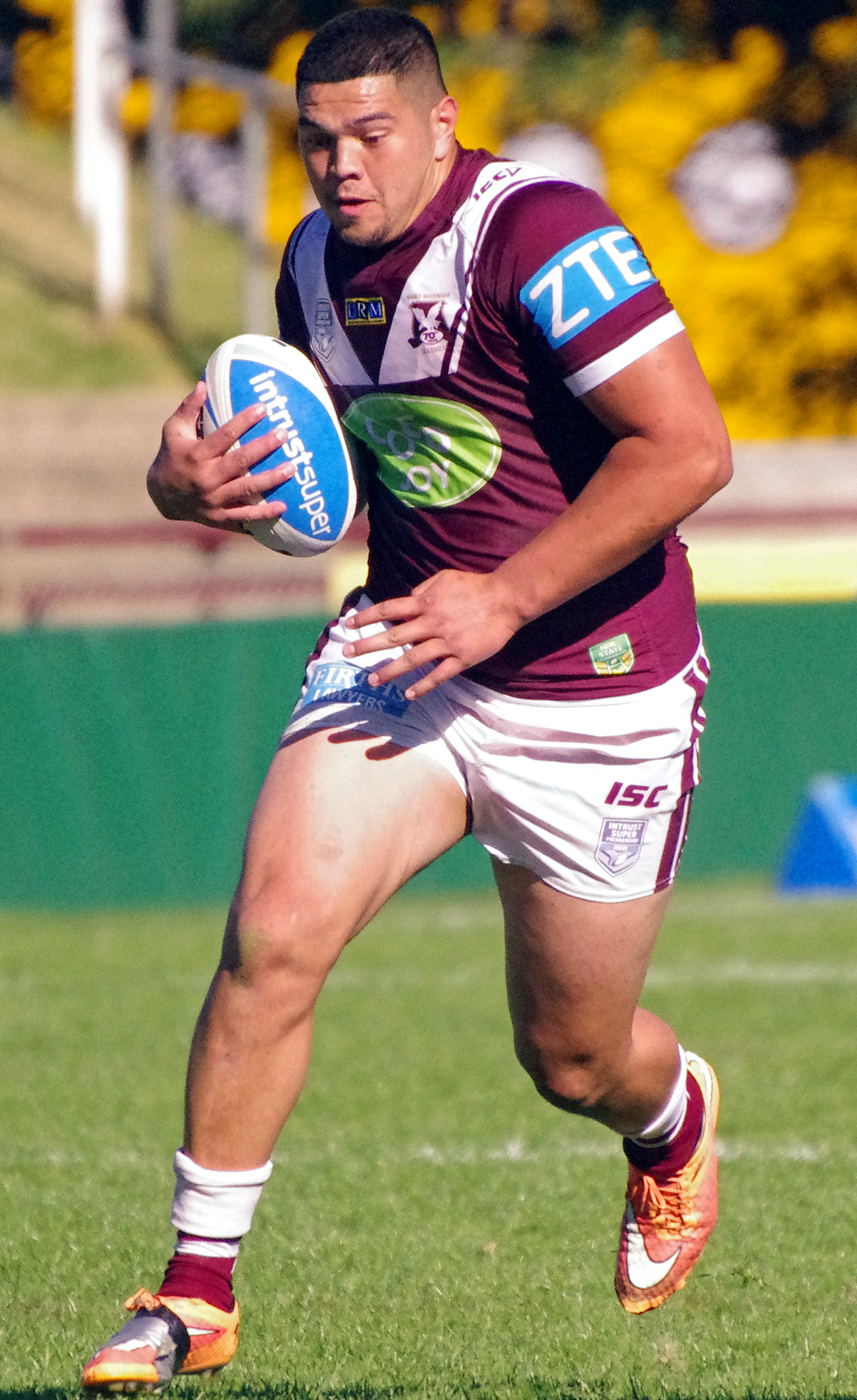
- Meehan playing for the Manly Warringah Sea Eagles in 2016.

Personal information
- Full name: Willis Pele Meehan
- Born: 11 September 1995 (age 31) Auckland, New Zealand

Playing information
- Height: 195 cm (6 ft 5 in)
- Weight: 115 kg (18 st 2 lb)
- Position: Second-row, Prop, Lock
Club
Years	Team	Pld	T	G	FG	P
2014	Sydney Roosters	1	0	0	0	0
- Boxing career
- Nickname: The Hitman
- Nationality: Australian
- Weight: Heavyweight
- Stance: Southpaw

Boxing record
- Total fights: 12
- Wins: 12
- Win by KO: 10
- Losses: 0
- Draws: 0
- No contests: 0

Willis Pele "The Hitman" Meehan (born 11 September 1995) is an Australian professional boxer. He previously played professional rugby league for the Sydney Roosters in the National Rugby League. He played at second-row, prop and lock. He has been compared to good friend and another rugby league-boxer and former teammate Sonny Bill Williams.

== Background ==
Born in Auckland, New Zealand, Meehan moved to New South Wales, Australia, at a young age and played his junior football for the West Ryde Aliens and Wyong Roos before being signed by the Sydney Roosters.

== Playing career ==
In 2013 and 2014, Meehan played for the Sydney Roosters' NYC team. In 2013, he played for the Australian Schoolboys. In Round 14 of the 2014 NRL season, Meehan made his NRL debut for the Roosters against the Newcastle Knights. On 2 September 2014, he was named at lock in the 2014 NYC Team of the Year. In 2015, Meehan was stood down by the Roosters after being charged with robbery in company and assault occasioning actual bodily harm. He was sacked by the club in July 2015. Meehan later played for Manly and the Auburn Warriors in the lower grades. In 2017, he signed a contract with Parramatta but was blocked from playing in the NRL for the 2017 NRL season. He instead played for the club's feeder team Wentworthville.

== Boxing ==
As a 17-year-old, Meehan won the Australian super-heavyweight boxing title and hoped to fight at the Commonwealth Games, narrowly missing out. In 2016, he hopes to fight at the 2016 Summer Olympics.

On 31 January 2015, Meehan fought on the undercard of the Sonny Bill Williams v Chauncy Welliver bout.

On 15 October 2015, Meehan defeated Leamy Tato; however, the main event saw Meehan's father defeated by Joseph Parker.

=== Professional boxing record ===
9 fights	9 wins	0 losses
By knockout	7	0
By decision	2	0

No.	Result	Record	Opponent	Type	Round, time	Date	Location	Notes
9	Win	9–0	(Hungary) Attila Kalman	UD	6	30 Aug 2019	The Melbourne Pavilion, Melbourne, Australia	
8	Win	8–0	(Argentina) Julián Esteban Ruiz	KO	1 (6), 0:44	1 Mar 2019	The Melbourne Pavilion, Melbourne, Australia	
7	Win	7–0	(Hungary) Richard Nemeth	TKO	1 (6), 1:36	17 Nov 2018	The Melbourne Pavilion, Melbourne, Australia	
6	Win	6–0	(Fiji) Jonasa Kavika	KO	2 (8), 2:13	6 Jul 2018	Roma Function Centre, Sydney, Australia	Won vacant WBF (Foundation) Australasian heavyweight title
5	Win	5–0	(New Zealand) Riki Barclay	TKO	1 (6), 1:02	27 Apr 2016	Convention & Exhibition Centre, Brisbane, Australia	
4	Win	4–0	(New Zealand) Leamy Lakopo Tato	TKO	2 (4), 0:30	15 Oct 2015	The Trusts Arena, Auckland, New Zealand	
3	Win	3–0	(United States) Freddie Miller	TKO	2 (4), 2:43	31 Jan 2015	Allphones Arena, Sydney, Australia	
2	Win	2–0	(Australia) Alofa Solitua	KO	1 (4), 1:28	3 Dec 2014	Hordern Pavilion, Sydney, Australia	
1	Win	1–0	(New Zealand) Will Quarrie	UD	4	22 Nov 2014	North Shore Events Centre, Auckland, New Zealand	

== Personal life ==
Meehan is the son of professional boxer, Kali Meehan. He converted to Islam in 2015.

In April 2015, Meehan was charged with headbutting a man and stealing his watch near The Star, Sydney. However, he was not convicted after his robbery in company charge was thrown out. Meehan later revealed he had been working, while playing for the Roosters, as a stand-over man to settle debts for Australian Hells Angels Bikies.
