= Justin Holbrook =

Australian rugby league coach

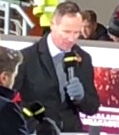

Personal information
- Full name: Justin Holbrook
- Born: 13 January 1976 (age 50) Australia

Playing information
- Position: Halfback
Club
Years	Team	Pld	T	G	FG	P
1999–00	Newcastle Knights	5	2	10	0	28
2001	Penrith Panthers	8	1	0	0	4
2002	Sydney Roosters	4	1	13	0	30
	Total	17	4	23	0	62

Coaching information
Club
Years	Team	Gms	W	D	L	W%
2017–19	St Helens	87	70	0	17	80
2020–23	Gold Coast Titans	82	31	0	51	38
2026–	Newcastle Knights	28	17	0	11	61
	Total	197	118	0	79	60
Representative
Years	Team	Gms	W	D	L	W%
2023	PNG PM's XIII	1	0	0	1	0
2023	Papua New Guinea	3	2	0	1	67
- Source: As of 11 September 2026

Justin Holbrook (born 13 January 1976) is the Australian professional rugby league coach who is the head coach of the Newcastle Knights in the NRL and a former professional rugby league footabller.

He previously coached St Helens in the Super League, the Gold Coast Titans in the NRL, and Papua New Guinea. He was an assistant coach of the Sydney Roosters until joining Newcastle in September of 2025. He played as a goal-kicking halfback in the 1990s and 2000s for the Newcastle Knights, Penrith Panthers and the Sydney Roosters in the NRL.

== Playing career ==
Holbrook commenced his National Rugby League career with the Newcastle Knights in 1999 under coach Warren Ryan. He spent the 2001 NRL season with the Penrith Panthers under coach Royce Simmons. For the 2002 NRL season Holbrook played for the Sydney Roosters under coach Ricky Stuart. That year he played for the Roosters in the first ever ANZAC Day Cup match, kicking a goal. 2002 was Holbrook's last season at the top level.

== Coaching career ==
Holbrook turned to coaching after retiring from playing. He started his coaching career as Captain-Coach of the Dapto Canaries from 2003 to 2007, being a pivotal part of Dapto's 2006 title. He then went to work on the coaching staff of the Canterbury-Bankstown Bulldogs, St George Illawarra and Parramatta before joining the Sydney Roosters as right-hand man to Trent Robinson. Holbrook also coached at representative level for Australia (under-21).

=== St Helens ===
He was appointed to replace Keiron Cunningham as head coach of English Super League club St Helens.

Holbrook in the St Helens coaches box at Anfield in May 2019

On 31 July 2019, it was announced that Holbrook signed a contract to become the new head coach at the Gold Coast for the 2020 season. In the weeks leading up to the announcement, Gold Coast Chairman Dennis Watt said that the next coaching appointment at the Gold Coast would be the club's last stand if results were to not improve under the new coach.

He was the St. Helens coach in the 2019 Challenge Cup Final defeat by the Warrington Wolves at Wembley Stadium.

During the Super League XXIV season, Holbrook guided St Helens to the League Leaders Shield after finishing 16 points clear of second placed Wigan. Holbrook then coached St Helens to their 14th championship win after defeating Salford 23–6 in the 2019 Super League Grand Final at Old Trafford.

=== Gold Coast Titans ===
Holbrook's reign as the Gold Coast head coach got off to a difficult start with the club losing their first three games. In round 4 against the Wests Tigers, Holbrook guided the club to their first win in 364 days as they won the match 28–23 at Suncorp Stadium. The Gold Coast would go on to finish the 2020 season in 9th position, a major improvement on the previous year in which they finished last. In the 2021 season, Holbrook guided the Gold Coast into the finals for the first time since 2016, as the club finished 8th. They were defeated 24–25 in the first week of the finals by the Sydney Roosters. Following Round 16 of the 2023 season, Holbrook and the Gold Coast Titans agreed to part ways effective immediately. Former Manly Warringah Sea Eagles coach, Des Hasler was signed and took over in 2024. Assistant Coach Jim Lenihan took over for the rest of the season beginning with their Round 17 match against the Brisbane Broncos before Hasler joins Following his departure from the Gold Coast club, Holbrook spoke with the media saying "I did not see this coming at all, that’s what I am pissed off about, I could understand if they said, 'Look you have three games or whatever time period to do something', but to be moved on like this, I’m still coming to terms with it".

=== Papua New Guinea ===
On 24 August 2023, it was reported that Holbrook had taken a deal to coach the Papua New Guinea national rugby league team for the end of season pacific championship. Holbrook's appointment as head coach is part of Papua New Guinea's strategic approach to creating an internal pathways system which is a part of their bid to join the National Rugby League. On 21 November 2023 it was announced Holbrook will continue as assistant coach at the Sydney Roosters alongside head coach Trent Robinson.

=== Newcastle Knights ===
On 15 September, 2025, Holbrook was appointed Head Coach of the Newcastle Knights after the release of Adam O'Brien.

The Newcastle Knights went into the 2026 season as the reigning wooden spooners. Under Holbrook's leadership, Newcastle secured a spot in the top 8, and made the NRL Grand Final. Their finals run included tough wins against the South Sydney Rabbitohs, New Zealand Warriors, and Minor Premiers the Penrith Panthers. Newcastle were defeated in the Grand Final by the Sydney Roosters 19-18. On 12 October 2026, the Knights that they had re-signed Holbrook until the end of 2030.
