= Garth Brennan =

Australian rugby league coach

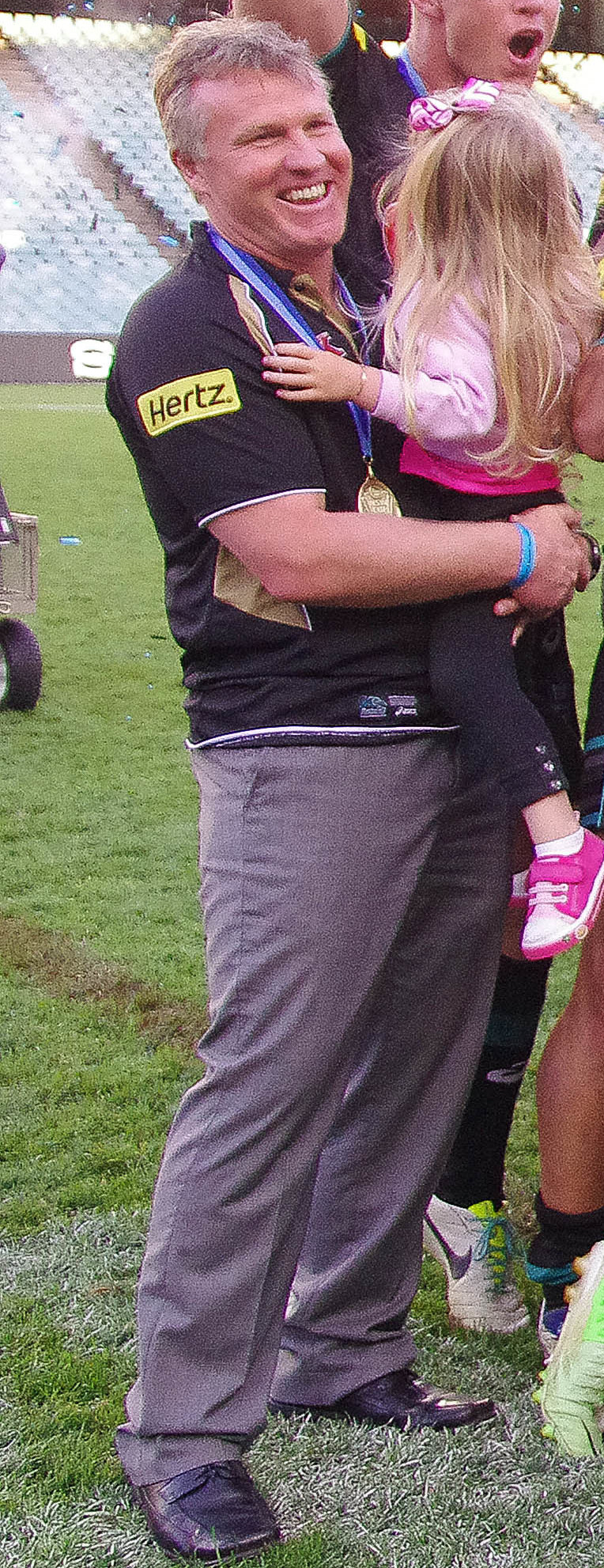

Personal information
- Born: 18 February 1972 (age 54) Newcastle, New South Wales, Australia

Coaching information
Club
Years	Team	Gms	W	D	L	W%
2018–19	Gold Coast Titans	40	12	0	28	30
Representative
Years	Team	Gms	W	D	L	W%
2015	NSW Residents	1	0	0	1	0
- Source: As of 9 January 2024

Garth Brennan (born 18 February 1972) is an Australian professional rugby league football coach who was the head coach of the Gold Coast Titans in the NRL. He previously held coaching positions at the Newcastle Knights and the Penrith Panthers.

== Playing career ==
Born and raised in Newcastle, New South Wales, Australia, Brennan played his junior rugby league for the Western Suburbs Rosellas. In the 1990s, he played for the Rosellas and Waratah-Mayfield in the Newcastle Rugby League, primarily at fullback.

== Coaching career ==
In 2003, Brennan became the assistant coach for the Newcastle Knights Jersey Flegg Cup side. In 2007, he became the head coach of the Knights' Harold Matthews Cup side, coaching them for two seasons. In 2009, he moved up to the Knights' NYC side as assistant coach. In 2010, he took over as head coach of the side, leading them to the finals for the first time in 2011.

He was let go by the club at the end of the season, joining the Penrith Panthers in 2012 as their NYC head coach. In his first season at Penrith, he took the side to the finals and was named the NYC Coach of the Year. During that season, he coached the New South Wales under-18 side in their 18–24 loss to Queensland under-18. In 2013, he started the season as the Panthers' NYC coach before being promoted to head coach of their NSW Cup side halfway through the season. He then returned as NYC coach towards the end of the season and lead them to their first premiership.

In 2014, Brennan again moved up to the NSW Cup as their head coach, winning the premiership that season. In 2015, he coached the New South Wales Residents side in their 32–26 loss to the Queensland Residents. In 2016, he became the assistant coach for the Panthers' NRL side. In 2017, he once again coached the Panthers' NSW Cup side, winning his second premiership and the club's first NRL State Championship. At the end of the season, he was set to be an assistant coach for New Zealand at the 2017 Rugby League World Cup before resigning to accept the Gold Coast Titans job.

=== Gold Coast Titans ===
On 19 October 2017, Brennan was announced as the head coach of the Gold Coast Titans. His first senior head coaching role, Brennan became just the third head coach in the club's history. On 14 July 2019, Brennan was terminated from his position as Gold Coast head coach after the club were sitting last on the table after only winning 4 out of 17 matches. Brennan had only managed 12 wins from a possible 40 matches in his tenure at the Gold Coast club.
