= 2024 Gold Coast Titans season =

NRL rugby league season

- NRL Rank: 14th
- Play-off result: DNQ
- 2024 record: Wins: 8; losses: 16
- Points scored: For: 488; against: 656

Team information
- CEO: Tanu Togitasi
- Head Coach: (Australia) Des Hasler
- Captain: (Australia) Tino Fa'asuamaleaui
- Stadium: Cbus Super Stadium (Capacity: 27,690)
← 2023	List of seasons	2025 →

The 2024 Gold Coast Titans season was the 18th season in the club's history and they competed in the National Rugby League.

The captain Tino Fa'asuamaleaui retained his captaincy for his 3rd season, while Head Coach Des Hasler had his 1st season at his position.

== Player movement ==
The following player movements happened across the previous season, off-season and pre-season.

=== Gains ===
Player	Previous club	Length
Keenan Palasia	Brisbane Broncos	2025
Harley Smith-Shields	Canberra Raiders	2025

=== Losses ===
Player	New Club
Aaron Booth	Retired
Patrick Herbert	Released
Kruise Leeming	Wigan Warriors
Sam McIntyre	North Queensland Cowboys
Thomas Mikaele	North Queensland Cowboys
Toby Sexton	Canterbury-Bankstown Bulldogs

== Squad information ==
Gold Coast Titans 2024 squad
Top 30 squad - 2024 NRL season			Supplementary list	Coaching staff
Jacob Alick-Wiencke – SR, LK; Tanah Boyd – HB, FE; AJ Brimson (vc) – CE, FB, FE; Jayden Campbell – FB, FE; Erin Clark – PR, LK; Iszac Fa'asuamaleaui – PR, LK; Tino Fa'asuamaleaui (c) – PR; Beau Fermor – SR, CE; David Fifita – SR; Jojo Fifita – WG, CE	Kieran Foran – HB, FE; Ryan Foran – SR; Moeaki Fotuaika – PR; Tony Francis – WG; Klese Haas – SR, LK; Jaimin Jolliffe – PR, LK; Brian Kelly – CE; Alofiana Khan-Pereira – WG; Keano Kini – FB; Isaac Liu – LK, PR	Ken Maumalo – WG; Josiah Pahulu – PR; Keenan Palasia – LK, PR; Chris Randall – HK, FE, LK; Phillip Sami – WG, CE; Harley Smith-Shields – CE, WG; Joe Stimson – LK, PR; Sam Verrills – HK; Tom Weaver – HB, FE	Oskar Bryant – HK; Jaylan De Groot – FB, WG, FE; Arama Hau – SR, LK; Ben Liyou – PR; Seth Nikotemo – SR; Ryder Williams – HB	Head coach: Des Hasler; Assistant coaches: Jim Lenihan; Michael Monaghan; Brett White; Brad Davis; Legend: (c) Captain(s); (vc) Vice-captain(s); Updated: 7 September 2024; Source(s): Titans Team Profiles

== Pre-season ==
Titans played the Dolphins in Sunshine Coast and the Parramatta Eels in Ipswich as their pre-season fixtures. Both matches were part of the second edition of the NRL Pre-season Challenge.

Round 1: 18 February 2024	Dolphins	26–14	Gold Coast Titans	Sunshine Coast
17:05 AEST	Tries: Farnworth 7'; Wallace 57'; Bostock 60'; Baira 66'; Lemuelu 74'; Goals: Isaako 0/1; Baira 3/4 58', 61', 68'	[Report; Details Report]	Tries: Francis 18', 35'; Steadman 71'; Goals: Schoupp 1/3 72'	Stadium: Sunshine Coast Stadium; Attendance: 7,698; Referee: Chris Butler

Round 2: 25 February 2024	Gold Coast Titans	16–26	Parramatta Eels	Ipswich
16:00 AEST	Tries: Sami 10'; Brimson 43'; Khan-Pereira 56'; S. Fifita 68'; Goals: Boyd 0/3; Weaver 0/1	[Report; Details Report]	Tries: Penisini 2'; Sivo 15'; Campbell-Gillard 21'; Cartwright 33'; Hopgood 46'; Goals: Moses 3/5 17', 23', 48'	Stadium: North Ipswich Reserve; Attendance: 5,306; Referee: Gerard Sutton

== Regular season ==
=== Ladder ===
Pos	Team	Pld	W	D	L	B	PF	PA	PD	Pts	Qualification
1	Melbourne Storm	24	19	0	5	3	692	449	+243	44	Advance to finals series
2	Penrith Panthers (P)	24	17	0	7	3	580	394	+186	40	Advance to finals series
3	Sydney Roosters	24	16	0	8	3	738	463	+275	38	Advance to finals series
4	Cronulla-Sutherland Sharks	24	16	0	8	3	653	431	+222	38	Advance to finals series
5	North Queensland Cowboys	24	15	0	9	3	657	568	+89	36	Advance to finals series
6	Canterbury-Bankstown Bulldogs	24	14	0	10	3	529	433	+96	34	Advance to finals series
7	Manly Warringah Sea Eagles	24	13	1	10	3	634	521	+113	33	Advance to finals series
8	Newcastle Knights	24	12	0	12	3	470	510	−40	30	Advance to finals series
9	Canberra Raiders	24	12	0	12	3	474	601	−127	30	
10	Dolphins	24	11	0	13	3	577	578	−1	28	
11	St. George Illawarra Dragons	24	11	0	13	3	508	634	−126	28	
12	Brisbane Broncos	24	10	0	14	3	537	607	−70	26	
13	New Zealand Warriors	24	9	1	14	3	512	574	−62	25	
14	Gold Coast Titans	24	8	0	16	3	488	656	−168	22	
15	Parramatta Eels	24	7	0	17	3	561	716	−155	20	
16	South Sydney Rabbitohs	24	7	0	17	3	494	682	−188	20	
17	Wests Tigers	24	6	0	18	3	463	750	−287	18	

Source: National Rugby League
(P) Premiers

=== Results by round ===
Round	1	2	3	4	5	6	7	8	9	10	11	12	13	14	15	16	17	18	19	20	21	22	23	24	25	26	27
Ground	H	–	A	H	A	A	H	A	H	H	N	A	–	H	A	H	–	A	H	A	A	H	H	A	H	A	A
Result	L	B	L	L	L	L	L	W	L	W	L	W	B	L	L	W	B	W	W	L	W	W	L	L	L	L	L
Position	16	13	16	17	16	16	17	16	16	16	16	14	14	15	17	15	15	15	14	15	14	11	13	13	13	14	14
Points	0	2	2	2	2	2	2	4	4	6	6	8	10	10	10	12	14	16	18	18	20	22	22	22	22	22	22

Source: National Rugby League
A = Away; H = Home; N = Neutral; B = Bye; W = Win; D = Draw; L = Loss

=== Matches ===
The league fixtures were announced on 13 November 2023.

Round 1: 9 March 2024	Gold Coast Titans	4–28	St. George Illawarra Dragons	Gold Coast
18:35 AEST	Tries: Khan-Pereira 34'; Goals: Boyd 0/1	[Report Report]	Tries: Sloan 2', 54', 66'; Flanagan 47'; Lomax 62'; Goals: Lomax 4/5 3', 48', 55', 67'	Stadium: Cbus Super Stadium; Attendance: 14,537; Referee: Ziggy Przeklasa-Adamski

Round 2 (Bye for Gold Coast Titans)

Round 3: 23 March 2024	Canterbury-Bankstown Bulldogs	32–0	Gold Coast Titans	Belmore
15:00 AEDT	Tries: Preston 17'; Kikau 29'; Mahoney 46'; Kiraz 53'; Tracey 60'; Taaffe 62'; Goals: Burton 4/6 19', 31', 47', 64'	[Report Report]		Stadium: Belmore Sports Ground; Attendance: 12,037; Referee: Todd Smith

Round 4: 30 March 2024	Gold Coast Titans	14–30	Dolphins	Gold Coast
18:35 AEST	Tries: Jolliffe 8'; Sami 12', 74'; Goals: Boyd 1/3 9'	[Report Report]	Tries: Bostock 23', 39'; Farnworth 57'; Tabuai-Fidow 63'; Kerr 68'; Goals: Isaako 5/5 24', 39', 57', 63', 68'; Sin bin: Plath (yellow card) 26' to 36'	Stadium: Cbus Super Stadium; Attendance: 13,898; Referee: Belinda Sharpe

Round 5: 7 April 2024	North Queensland Cowboys	35–22	Gold Coast Titans	Townsville
16:05 AEST	Tries: Laybutt 5'; Taulagi 14'; Drinkwater 32', 50'; Robson 53'; Feldt 68'; Goals: Holmes 5/6 6', 33', 51', 55', 70'; Field goals: Townsend 72'; Sin bin: Townsend (yellow card) 60' to 70'	[Report Report]	Tries: Kelly 45'; Campbell 57'; Haas 62'; Fermor 64'; Goals: Boyd 3/4 58', 63', 66'	Stadium: Queensland Country Bank Stadium; Attendance: 18,870; Referee: Chris Butler

Round 6: 14 April 2024	Canberra Raiders	21–20 (g.p.)	Gold Coast Titans	Canberra
18:15 AEST	Tries: Schiller 17', 68'; Young 25'; Goals: Fogarty 4/4 19', 27', 48 pen', 70'; Field goals: Fogarty 89'	[Report Report]	Tries: Jolliffe 38'; Smith-Shields 43'; Khan-Pereira 75', 79'; Goals: Campbell 1/2 39'; Kelly 1/2 79'	Stadium: GIO Stadium; Attendance: 11,738; Referee: Kasey Badger

Round 7: 20 April 2024	Gold Coast Titans	30–34	Manly Warringah Sea Eagles	Gold Coast
17:30 AEST	Tries: Khan-Pereira 13', 19'; D. Fifita 32'; Brimson 36'; Boyd 52'; Goals: Boyd 5/5 15', 20', 33', 36', 53'	[Report Report]	Tries: T. Trbojevic 5', 38'; Saab 8'; Olakau'atu 24'; Koula 43'; Bullemor 55'; Goals: Garrick 5/6 6', 25', 39', 44', 56'	Stadium: Cbus Super Stadium; Attendance: 13,336; Referee: Liam Kennedy

Round 8: 25 April 2024	New Zealand Warriors	24–27	Gold Coast Titans	Auckland
16:00 NZST	Tries: Nicoll-Klokstad 3'; Fonua-Blake 6', 57'; Berry 62'; Goals: Johnson 4/4 4', 8', 58', 63'	[Report Report]	Tries: Brimson 13', 54'; Boyd 30'; D. Fifita 36'; Khan-Pereira 42'; Goals: Boyd 3/5 14', 32', 38'; Field goals: Boyd 39'	Stadium: Go Media Stadium; Attendance: 23,912; Referee: Wyatt Raymond

Round 9: 4 May 2024	Gold Coast Titans	20–22	Melbourne Storm	Gold Coast
17:30 AEST	Tries: K. Foran 16'; Sami 35'; Brimson 47'; Goals: Kelly 4/5 18', 36', 48', 53 pen'	[Report Report]	Tries: Munster 20'; Warbrick 24'; Papenhuyzen 26'; Fa'alogo 33'; Goals: Meaney 3/6 22', 27', 67 pen'	Stadium: Cbus Super Stadium; Attendance: 13,096; Referee: Belinda Sharpe

Round 10: 12 May 2024	Gold Coast Titans	20–18	North Queensland Cowboys	Gold Coast
16:05 AEST	Tries: S. Fifita 20'; D. Fifita 24'; Brimson 34'; Goals: Kelly 4/4 4 pen', 21', 26', 36'	[Report Report]	Tries: Nanai 60', 74'; Feldt 77'; Goals: Holmes 2/2 61', 75'; Drinkwater 1/1 77'	Stadium: Cbus Super Stadium; Attendance: 12,125; Referee: Wyatt Raymond

Round 11: 18 May 2024	Gold Coast Titans	24–28	Newcastle Knights	Brisbane
15:00 AEST	Tries: Haas 14'; Khan-Pereira 18', 36'; S. Fifita 24'; Kini 34'; Goals: Schoupp 1/3 19'; Kelly 1/2 35'; Sin bin: Schoupp (yellow card) 30' to 40'	[Report Report]	Tries: Armstrong 4', 8', 46'; Jones 50'; J. Saifiti 67'; Goals: Hastings 4/5 5', 48', 52', 68'	Stadium: Suncorp Stadium; Attendance: 38,154; Referee: Gerard Sutton

Round 12: 27 May 2024	Brisbane Broncos	34–36	Gold Coast Titans	Brisbane
14:00 AEST	Tries: Haas 4'; Oates 17'; Mariner 20'; Piakura 35'; Mam 52'; Cobbo 73'; Goals: Madden 5/6 6', 19', 21', 37', 53'	[Report Report]	Tries: Francis 12'; Fermor 26'; Clark 38'; Randall 47'; Palasia 60'; Kelly 64'; Khan-Pereira 68'; Goals: Kini 4/7 14', 27', 48', 62'	Stadium: Suncorp Stadium; Attendance: 42,212; Referee: Peter Gough

Round 13 (Bye for Gold Coast Titans)

Round 14: 8 June 2024	Gold Coast Titans	12–46	South Sydney Rabbitohs	Gold Coast
15:00 AEST	Tries: Khan-Pereira 19'; D. Fifita 69'; Goals: Campbell 2/2 21', 70'	[Report Report]	Tries: L. Mitchell 8'; Gagai 12'; Kennar 28'; Walker 34', 77'; Burgess 54'; Moale 64'; Wighton 74'; Goals: L. Mitchell 6/7 9', 29', 35', 55', 65', 78'; Arrow 1/1 76'	Stadium: Cbus Super Stadium; Attendance: 14,434; Referee: Chris Sutton

Round 15: 15 June 2024	Wests Tigers	18–10	Gold Coast Titans	Leichhardt
15:00 AEST	Tries: Olam 11', 59'; Pole 76'; Goals: Koroisau 3/3 12', 61', 77'	[Report Report]	Tries: S. Fifita 5'; Campbell 19'; Goals: Campbell 1/2 6'	Stadium: Leichhardt Oval; Attendance: 8,147; Referee: Ashley Klein

Round 16: 22 June 2024	Gold Coast Titans	66–6	New Zealand Warriors	Gold Coast
15:00 AEST	Tries: Khan-Pereira 15', 46', 62', 78'; Fermor 20'; Randall 25'; Palasia 31'; Verrills 39'; Kini 53', 67'; Campbell 56'; Goals: Campbell 11/11 17', 22', 26', 32', 40', 48', 54', 57', 63', 69', 79'	[Report Report]	Tries: Martin 58'; Goals: Pompey 1/1 59'; Sin bin: Tuivasa-Sheck (yellow card) 53' to 63'	Stadium: Cbus Super Stadium; Attendance: 22,702; Referee: Adam Gee

Round 17 (Bye for Gold Coast Titans)

Round 18: 5 July 2024	Cronulla-Sutherland Sharks	16–20	Gold Coast Titans	Coffs Harbour
18:00 AEST	Tries: Trindall 47'; Atkinson 60'; Hynes 74'; Goals: Hynes 2/3 61', 75'; Sin bin: Talakai (yellow card) 10' to 20'	[Report Report]	Tries: K. Foran 6'; Randall 13'; Palasia 51'; Goals: Boyd 4/4 7', 14', 44 pen', 53'	Stadium: C.ex Coffs International Stadium; Attendance: 8,673; Referee: Ziggy Przeklasa-Adamski

Round 19: 13 July 2024	Gold Coast Titans	24–16	Parramatta Eels	Gold Coast
17:30 AEST	Tries: Khan-Pereira 9', 12'; Sami 19'; Kelly 54'; Goals: Campbell 4/4 10', 13', 20', 55'	[Report Report]	Tries: Moretti 30'; Penisini 58'; Gutherson 65'; Goals: Asi 2/3 32', 66'	Stadium: Cbus Super Stadium; Attendance: 16,670; Referee: Todd Smith

Round 20: 21 July 2024	Manly Warringah Sea Eagles	38–8	Gold Coast Titans	Brookvale
16:05 AEST	Tries: Brooks 31'; Hopoate 33'; Saab 44'; T. Trbojevic 46', 59'; B. Trbojevic 72'; Talau 76'; Goals: Garrick 5/7 32', 34', 45', 47', 61'	[Report Report]	Tries: Khan-Pereira 9'; Fermor 12'; Goals: Campbell 0/2	Stadium: 4 Pines Park; Attendance: 16,050; Referee: Liam Kennedy

Round 21: 28 July 2024	Dolphins	14–21	Gold Coast Titans	Brisbane
16:05 AEST	Tries: Pangai Junior 3'; J. Bromwich 12'; Goals: Isaako 3/3 5', 14', 21 pen' Sin bin: Kerr (yellow card) 37' to 47'	[Report Report]	Tries: Kelly 38'; Khan-Pereira 50', 58'; Haas 69'; Goals: Campbell 2/4 39', 71'; Field goals: K. Foran 73'	Stadium: Suncorp Stadium; Attendance: 19,533; Referee: Todd Smith

Round 22: 3 August 2024	Gold Coast Titans	46–18	Brisbane Broncos	Gold Coast
15:00 AEST	Tries: Kini 19', 47'; S. Fifita 26', 54', 73'; Kelly 50'; Khan-Pereira 68'; Sami 76'; Fermor 78'; Goals: Campbell 5/9 28', 51', 55', 70', 79'; Sin bin: Kini (yellow card) 36' to 46'	[Report Report]	Tries: Walsh 10', 14'; Hetherington 33'; Goals: Reynolds 3/4 11', 15', 37 pen'	Stadium: Cbus Super Stadium; Attendance: 25,278; Referee: Peter Gough

Round 23: 9 August 2024	Gold Coast Titans	0–44	Cronulla-Sutherland Sharks	Gold Coast
18:00 AEST	Sin bin: Fotuaika (yellow card) 16' to 26'	[Report Report]	Tries: Rudolf 4'; Stonestreet 14', 45'; Ramien 17'; Hazelton 24'; Talakai 27'; Nikora 59'; Williams 67'; Goals: Atkinson 6/8 5', 15', 19', 26', 28', 61'; Sin bin: Ramien (yellow card) 70' to 80'	Stadium: Cbus Super Stadium; Attendance: 13,287; Referee: Adam Gee

Round 24: 18 August 2024	St. George Illawarra Dragons	32–16	Gold Coast Titans	Wollongong
14:00 AEST	Tries: Tuipulotu 7'; Hunt 10'; Lomax 27'; T. Couchman 32'; Leilua 38'; F. Molo 76'; Goals: Lomax 4/6 11', 34', 39', 77'; Sin bin: De Belin (yellow card) 51' to 61'	[Report Report]	Tries: S. Fifita 1', 64'; Campbell 45'; Goals: Campbell 2/3 2', 47'	Stadium: WIN Stadium; Attendance: 9,240; Referee: Wyatt Raymond

Round 25: 25 August 2024	Gold Coast Titans	22–48	Sydney Roosters	Gold Coast
14:00 AEST	Tries: Khan-Pereira 9', 26', 76'; Kini 49'; Goals: Campbell 3/4 27', 51', 76'	[Report Report]	Tries: Crichton 3', 55', 57'; Young 22'; Tupou 29', 39'; Walker 32'; Tedesco 44'; Tupouniua 66'; Goals: Walker 6/9 4', 31', 34', 45', 56', 68'; Sin bin: Waerea-Hargreaves (yellow card) 11' to 21'	Stadium: Cbus Super Stadium; Attendance: 19,286; Referee: Adam Gee

Round 26: 1 September 2024	Newcastle Knights	36–14	Gold Coast Titans	Newcastle
14:00 AEST	Tries: Ponga 20', 37'; Sharpe 42', 46', 50'; Crossland 55'; Thompson 78'; Goals: Ponga 4/7 22', 38', 57', 79'	[Report Report]	Tries: S. Fifita 6', 59'; De Groot 69'; Goals: Campbell 1/3 70'	Stadium: McDonald Jones Stadium; Attendance: 24,712; Referee: Gerard Sutton

Round 27: 7 September 2024	Penrith Panthers	18–12	Gold Coast Titans	Penrith
19:35 AEST	Tries: To'o 6'; Edwards 43'; Garner 50'; Goals: Alamoti 3/4 44', 51', 75 pen'	[Report Report]	Tries: Campbell 15'; Khan-Pereira 68'; Goals: Campbell 2/2 16', 69'	Stadium: BlueBet Stadium; Attendance: 21,525; Referee: Chris Butler

== Player statistics ==
As of 13 April 2024
