= Fifita =

Fifita is a Tongan given name and surname. Notable people with the name include:

Given name:

- Fifita Moala (born 1980), Tongan rugby league footballer
- Fifita Mounga (born 1973), Tongan rugby union footballer

Surname:

- Andrew Fifita (born 1989), Australian rugby league footballer
- Alipate Fifita (born 1982), Tongan professional wrestler
- Pila Fifita (born 1975), Tongan rugby union footballer
- John Fifita, Tongan rugby league footballer
- Steve Fifita (born 1982), American football player
- Talai Fifita (born 1962), Tongan rugby union footballer
- Tonga Fifita (born 1959), Tongan professional wrestler
- Tevita Fifita (born 1983), American professional wrestler
- Ruha Fifita, (born 1990), New Zealand artist
- Vaea Fifita, (born 1992), New Zealand rugby union footballer
- Vunipola Fifita (born 1996), Australian rugby union footballer
- Noah Fifita (born 2003), American football player
