= 2023 Dally M Awards =

National Rugby League Awards

- Date: 27 September 2023
- Location: Randwick Racecourse, Sydney
- Hosted by: Yvonne Sampson
- Dally M Medal: Kalyn Ponga; Tamika Upton

Television/radio coverage
- Network: Fox League

The 2023 Dally M Awards were presented on 27 September 2023. They are the official annual awards of the National Rugby League and are named after Dally Messenger.

Several changes were implemented for the voting process for the 2023 season, including the introduction of a second independent judge, raising the maximum votes a player can receive per match from three to six. The point deduction for a one-game suspension was also raised from three to six, while players suspended for two or more games remain ineligible to receive any awards.

== Dally M Medal ==
Dally M Player of the Year (Men):

Player votes tally – Top 10
Points	Player (Men)
56	Kalyn Ponga
55	Shaun Johnson
54	Nicholas Hynes
50	Daly Cherry-Evans
50	Scott Drinkwater*
48	Nathan Cleary
47	Harry Grant
44	Addin Fonua-Blake
42	Dylan Edwards
42	Payne Haas
42	Reece Walsh*

Dally M Player of the Year (Women):

Player votes tally – Top 10
Points	Player (Women)
27	Tamika Upton
26	Tarryn Aiken
22	Simaima Taufa
22	Ali Brigginshaw
20	Teagan Berry
18	Shannon Mato
17	Evania Pelite
17	Zahara Temara
15	Gayle Broughton
15	Raecene McGregor

Note: Player marked with an asterisk (*) were ineligible

== Dally M Awards ==
The Dally M Awards are, as usual, conducted at the close of the regular season and hence do not take games played in the finals series into account.

Award	Player
Provan-Summons Medal (Spirit of the Game)(Mens)	Nicholas Hynes
Provan-Summons Medal (Spirit of the Game)(Women's)	Lavinia Gould
Rookie of the Year	Sunia Turuva
Captain of the Year	Adam Reynolds
Coach of the Year	Andrew Webster
Top Tryscorer of the Year (Ken Irvine Medal)	Jamayne Isaako
Top Pointscorer of the Year	Jamayne Isaako
VB Hard Earned Player of the Year Award	Addin Fonua-Blake
Ken Stephen Medal	Latrell Mitchell
Drinkwise Try of the Year	Mathew Feagai
Youi Tackle of the Year	Haumole Olakau'atu
NRLW Rookie of the year	Annessa Biddle
NRLW Coach of the Year	Karyn Murphy
NRLW Captain of the Year	Simaima Taufa
NRLW Try of the Year	Jesse Southwell
NRLW Tackle of the Year	Jakiya Whitfeld
Veronica White Medal	Tahlulah Tillett

Team of the Year

Award	Player
Best Fullback	Kalyn Ponga
Best Wingers	Dallin Watene-Zelezniak
Best Wingers	Jamayne Isaako
Best Centres	Stephen Crichton
Best Centres	Herbie Farnworth
Best Five-Eighth	Ezra Mam
Best Halfback	Shaun Johnson
Best Hooker	Harry Grant
Best Props	Payne Haas
Best Props	Addin Fonua-Blake
Best Second-Rowers	Liam Martin
Best Second-Rowers	David Fifita
Best Lock	Patrick Carrigan

Women's Team of the Year

Award	Player
Best Fullback	Tamika Upton
Best Wingers	Jakiya Whitfeld
Best Wingers	Julia Robinson
Best Centres	Isabelle Kelly
Best Centres	Mele Hufanga
Best Five-Eighth	Tarryn Aiken
Best Halfback	Ali Brigginshaw
Best Hooker	Destiny Brill
Best Props	Shannon Mato
Best Props	Sarah Togatuki
Best Second-Rowers	Yasmin Clydsdale
Best Second-Rowers	Olivia Kernick
Best Lock	Simaima Taufa

== See also ==
- Dally M Awards
- Dally M Medal
- 2023 NRL season
