= 2018 Dally M Awards =

Official annual awards of the National Rugby League

- Date: 26 September
- Location: Overseas Passenger Terminal
- Hosted by: Yvonne Sampson; Lara Pitt; Hannah Hollis; Jessica Yates
- Dally M Medal: Roger Tuivasa-Sheck

Television/radio coverage
- Network: Fox League

The 2018 Dally M Awards was presented on Wednesday 26 September 2018. They are the official annual awards of the National Rugby League and are named after Dally Messenger.

== Dally M Medal ==
Dally M Player of the Year: Roger Tuivasa-Sheck

Player votes tally – Top 10
Points	Player
29	Roger Tuivasa-Sheck
27	Kalyn Ponga
26	Luke Brooks
25	Valentine Holmes
23	Mitchell Pearce
19	Jason Taumalolo
19	Cameron Munster
18	Ashley Taylor
18	Damien Cook
18	Issac Luke

== Dally M Awards ==
The Dally M Awards are usually conducted at the close of the regular season and hence do not take games played in the finals series into account. The Dally M Medal is for the official player of the year while the Provan-Summons Medal is for the fans' of "people's choice" player of the year.

Award	Player
Provan-Summons Medal (Note: This was the last season that the Provan-Summons Medal was awarded to the "people's choice" for player of the year.)	Damien Cook
Award for Rookie of the Year	Jamayne Isaako
Captain of the Year	Cameron Smith
Coach of the Year	Anthony Seibold
Top Tryscorer of the Year (Ken Irvine Medal)	David Fusitu'a
Top Pointscorer of the Year	Jamayne Isaako
Ken Stephen Medal	Ryan James
Female Player of the Year	Brittany Breayley

Team of the Year

Award	Player
Best Fullback	Roger Tuivasa-Sheck
Best Winger	Blake Ferguson
Best Centre	Joseph Leilua
Best Five-Eighth	Cameron Munster
Best Halfback	Luke Brooks
Best Lock	Jason Taumalolo
Best Second-Rower	Josh Jackson
Best Prop	Andrew Fifita
Best Hooker	Damien Cook
Best Interchange Player	Jazz Tevaga

== Presenters ==
Hosts

- Yvonne Sampson, Lara Pitt, Hannah Hollis and Jessica Yates

Top Try and Point Scorer

- Michael Irvine

Rookie Award

- Billy Slater & Johnathan Thurston

Ken Stephen Medal

- Yvonne Sampson

Coach of the Year

- Kevin Walters

Captain of the Year

Women's Player of the Year

- Tarsha Gale

Countdown

- Jess Yates & Mal Meninga

Team of the Year

- Todd Greenberg

== Judging Panel ==
- Greg Alexander (Fox League)
- Braith Anasta (Fox League)
- Richie Barnett (Sky Sport)
- Gary Belcher (Fox League)
- Monty Betham (Sky Sport)
- Darryl Brohman
- Danny Buderus (Fox League)
- Brett Finch (Fox League)
- Joe Galuvao
- Mark Gasnier (Fox League)
- Ryan Girdler (Triple M)
- Daryl Halligan (Sky Sports)
- Andrew Johns (Nine)
- Dallas Johnson
- Brett Kimmorley (Fox League)
- Darren Lockyer (Nine)
- Steve Menzies
- Steve Roach (Fox League)
- Andrew Ryan (ABC)
- Jimmy Smith
- Peter Sterling (Nine)
- Alan Tongue (ABC)
- Kevin Walters (Fox League)

== See also ==
- Dally M Awards
- Dally M Medal
- 2018 NRL season
