= David Fusitu'a =

New Zealand and Tonga rugby player

David Fusitua
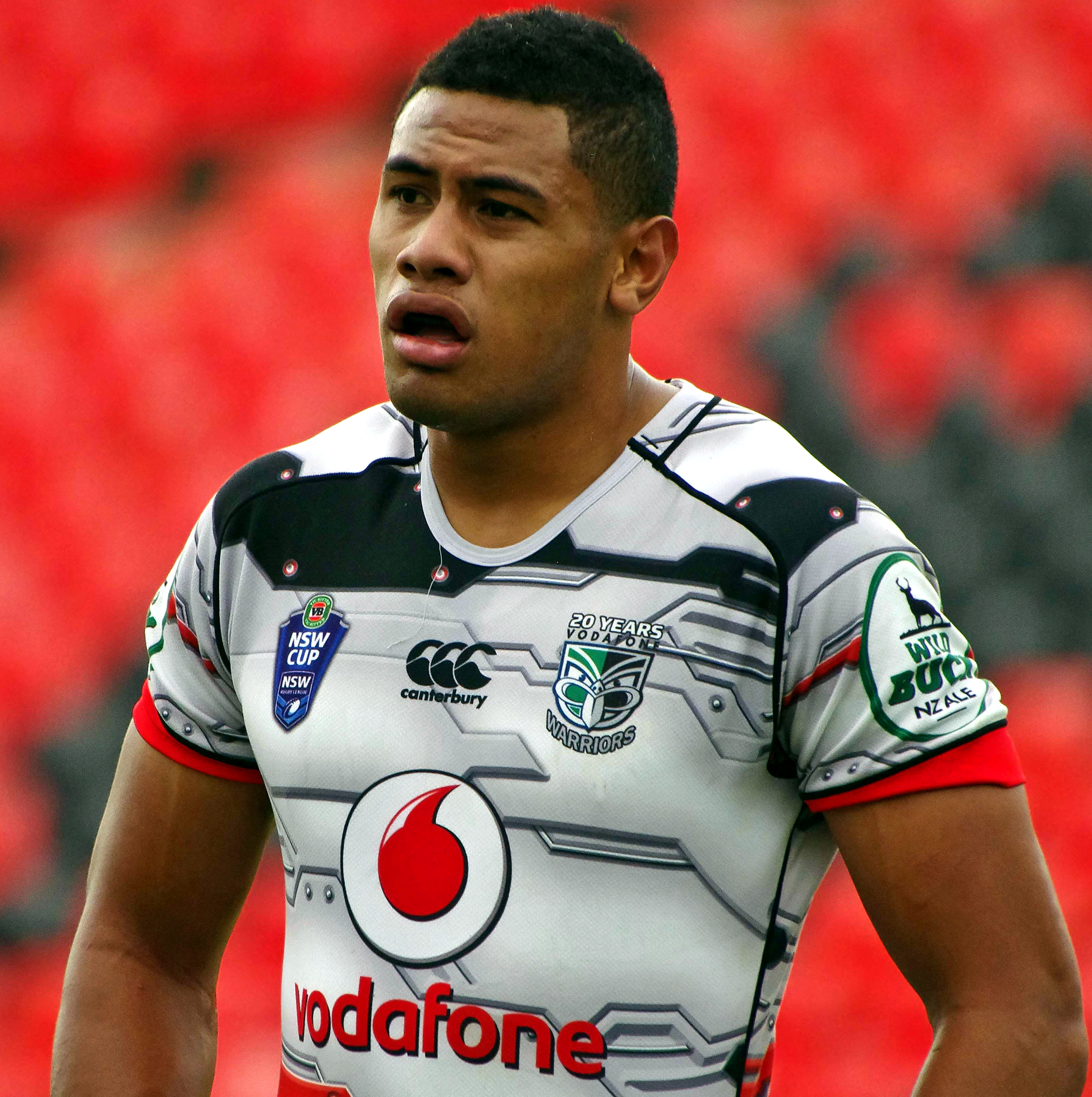

Personal information
- Full name: David Ue'Ikaetau Fusitu'a
- Born: 16 October 1994 (age 32) Auckland, New Zealand
- Height: 189 cm (6 ft 2 in)
- Weight: 106 kg (16 st 10 lb)

Playing information

Rugby league
- Position: Wing, Centre
Club
Years	Team	Pld	T	G	FG	P
2014–21	New Zealand Warriors	108	61	0	0	244
2022–24	Leeds Rhinos	43	18	0	0	72
	Total	151	79	0	0	316
Representative
Years	Team	Pld	T	G	FG	P
2016–19	Tonga	9	5	0	0	20
2016	New Zealand	2	2	0	0	8

Rugby union
Club
Years	Team	Pld	T	G	FG	P
2026–	Queensland Reds	0	0	0	0	0
- Source: As of 22 November 2026

David Fusitu'a (born 16 October 1994) is a professional rugby league and rugby union footballer who plays for Queensland Reds in the Super Rugby competition. He formerly has played for both Tonga and New Zealand at international level.

== Early life ==
Fusitu'a was born in Auckland, New Zealand.

Fusitu'a attended Kelston Boys' High School and played junior football for the Marist Saints.

== Playing career ==
Fusitu'a was signed by the New Zealand Warriors and played for the Junior Warriors in 2012 as a 17-year-old. In 2013 he played in the side that lost the Holden Cup Grand Final and also spent time with the Auckland Vulcans in the NSW Cup. Fusitu'a played for New Zealand under-18s in 2011 and the Junior Kiwis in 2012 and 2013. Fusitu'a was named in the train on squad for Tonga for the 2013 World Cup but was not selected in the final squad.

=== 2014 ===
In February 2014, Fusitu'a was selected for the Warriors inaugural 2014 Auckland Nines squad. In Round 2 of the 2014 NRL The best of, Fusitu'a made his first grade debut for the New Zealand Warriors on the wing, replacing the injured Manu Vatuvei in the Warriors 31–12 loss at Eden Park. In Round 8 in the ANZAC Day match against the Meplbourne Storm at AAMI Park, he scored his first first grade try in the Warriors 16–10 win and he finished off his debut year in the NRL with him playing in 12 matches and scoring 7 tries for the Warriors in the 2014 NRL season. On 9 September 2014, Fusitu'a was selected for the New Zealand national rugby league team 2014 Rugby League Four Nations train on squad. On 12 December 2014, Fusitu'a re-signed with the New Zealand Warriors on a 2-year contract, keeping him at the club to the end of the 2017 season.

=== 2015 ===
Fusitu’a played in 3 matches and scored 2 tries for the Warriors in an injury-riddled 2015 NRL season.

=== 2016 ===
In February, Fusitu'a played for the Warriors in the 2016 NRL Auckland Nines. In Round 7 against the Canterbury-Bankstown Bulldogs, Fusitu’a made his return to the Warriors first grade team for the first time since Round 19 of the 2015 season, playing on the wing and scoring a try in the 24–20 win at Westpac Stadium. On 7 May 2016, Fusitu'a made his International debut for Tonga against Samoa in the 2016 Polynesian Cup where he played at fullback in the 18–6 loss at Parramatta Stadium. In Round 14, Fusitu'a scored a career high 4 tries against the Newcastle Knights in their 50–14 win in Hunter Stadium.

Fusitu’a finished the 2016 NRL season with him playing in 18 matches and scoring 11 tries for the Warriors. On 4 October 2016, Fusitu’a was selected in the New Zealand national rugby league team 24-man squad for the 2016 Four Nations. On 6 October 2016, Fusitu'a extended his contract with the Warriors to the end of the 2019 season. On 11 November 2016, Fusitu’a made his international debut for New Zealand against Scotland, playing on the wing and scoring 2 tries in the shock 18-18 all draw at Derwent Park. On 20 November 2016, Fusitu’a would make his second appearance the Kiwis, playing in the 2016 Four Nations Final against Australia on the wing in the 34–8 loss at Anfield.

=== 2017 ===
In Round 1, against the Newcastle Knights, Fusitu’a scored his first career hattrick of tries in the 26–22 win at Mt Smart Stadium. Fusitu’a finished the 2017 NRL season with him playing in all of the Warriors 24 matches and scoring 12 tries. On 4 October, Fusitu’a was selected in the 24-man squad for Tonga for the 2017 Rugby League World Cup after defecting from New Zealand. On 11 November, in the highly entertaining clash against New Zealand, he scored a hattrick of tries as Tonga pulled off the biggest upset of the tournament, defeating the Kiwis 28–22 at Waikato Stadium. In the next match against Lebanon, Fusitu’a scored a double in the nail biting 24–22 victory at Lancaster Park. Fusitu’a played in 4 matches and scored 5 tries for Tonga in their outstanding tournament.

=== 2018 ===
Following a breakout performance for Tonga in the World Cup, in 2018 Fusitu'a produced the finest NRL season of his career to date with the Warriors. He appeared in 23 games and scored 23 tries, (including two hat-tricks and five doubles), finishing as the NRL's top tryscorer for 2018. The Warriors finished in the top 8 for the first time since 2011, with Fusitu'a scoring a try in their qualifying final loss to Penrith. In the annual NRL.com Player's Poll, he earnt 21% of the Best Winger votes, the second highest behind Josh Addo-Carr who polled 27%. His meteoric rise was cemented in August when the Warriors signed him to a long-term deal, ensuring he would stay with the club until the end of 2023.

He was named on the wing again for Tonga in their historic first-ever Test match with the Australian Kangaroos on 20 October 2018, played in front of a sold-out crowd at Mount Smart Stadium, Auckland.

=== 2019 & 2020 ===
In the 2019 NRL season, he made 16 appearances and scored five tries as the club missed out on the finals. In the 2020 NRL season, Fusitu'a was limited to only seven appearances as the New Zealand Warriors again missed out on the finals.

=== 2021 ===
On 18 October, he signed a two-year deal with English side Leeds despite having two years remaining on his contract with the New Zealand Warriors.

=== 2022 ===
In round 1 of the 2022 Super League season, he made his club debut for Leeds in their 22–20 loss against Warrington. Fusitu'a missed the clubs 2022 Super League Grand Final loss to St Helens due to injury.

=== 2023 ===
In round 16 of the 2023 Super League season, Fusitu'a scored two tries as Leeds defeated Huddersfield 54–0. He played a total of 17 games for Leeds in the 2023 Super League season and scored ten tries as the club finished 8th on the table and missed the playoffs.

=== 2024 ===
Fusitu'a played 12 games for Leeds in the 2024 Super League season as the club finished 8th on the table.

=== 2026 ===
On 16 September 2026 it was reported that he had joined rugby union Super Rugby team Queensland Reds, after previously announcing his retirement from rugby league in 2025

== Achievements and accolades ==
Individual

- 2018: Ken Irvine Medal - Dally M Top Try Scorer (23)
