= Pila Fifita =

Tonga international rugby union player (born 1975)

- Born: Viliame Fifita; 13 June 1975 (age 51) Viliame Fifita, Tonga
- Height: 1.86 m (6 ft 1 in)
- Weight: 107 kg (16 st 12 lb)

Rugby union career
- Position: Wing
Senior career
Years	Team	Apps	(Points)
2000-05	North Otago	33	(155)
2005-06	Saracens		
2006-	Fukuoka Sanix Blues		
International career
Years	Team	Apps	(Points)
2003, 2005	Tonga	2	(0)

Pila Fifita (born 13 June 1975 in Viliame Fifita) is a rugby union player who has represented Tonga, including one cap during the 2003 Rugby World Cup. He also played two seasons for the New Zealand Divisional 15. He plays as a winger. He is the father of Sosefo Fifita.

== North Otago ==
Pila Fifita debuted for North Otago in 2000. He along with most of his teammates suffered losses in his first two seasons the worst being in 2001 in the NPC final, but he enjoyed success in 2002 when he was a main part of the NPC 3rd Division winning team. In 2002, he scored 15 tries for the season including three hat-tricks, the best coming in the final against Horowhenua-Kapiti making him the first person out of any of the NPC divisions to score three tries in a NPC final. He ended up scoring 79 points for the season. Fifita played many matches for North Otago the last coming at the end of the 2005 season, he was a stand out player in the union and he was arguerably one of North Otago's greatest and most valuarable players.

== Saracens ==
After playing for North Otago Fifita signed a deal with European club Saracens in 2004. The Saracens head coach Rod Kafer said "We have been looking to get the correct balance and variety in our back line and we feel Pila will provide that. He's a very powerful player who can break the gain line and carry the ball in an uncompromising way. We've cast the net far and wide in order to get the balance in our squad."

== Fukuoka Sanix Blues ==
After playing a couple of seasons in Europe for Saracens he went to play for the Japanese club Fukuoka Sanix Blues in the Top League. He is currently still playing for the Fukuoka Sanix Blues.

== Tonga ==
In 2003, after playing impressive matches for North Otago in 2002 and 2003, Pila Fifita was called into the Tongan rugby world cup squad to replace Aisea Havili after he withdrew because of a leg injury. North Otago chief executive Ian Patterson said Fifita's selection was exciting for the province. "We're absolutely thrilled for Pila. He's had a very strong couple of seasons and it's great for him to get this reward. He's a major part of our team and we will miss him". Fifita got to play one match in the 2003 rugby world cup on 29 October against Canada. In 2005, Fifita was again called into the Tongan rugby team but like in 2003 he only played one match.

== Griffith Uni Colleges Knights ==
As of January 2018 Fifita is currently a member of the Griffith Uni Colleges Knights in the Gold Coast District Rugby Union Competition on the Gold Coast, QLD, Australia.
