= Ryder Williams =

American ocean lifeguard

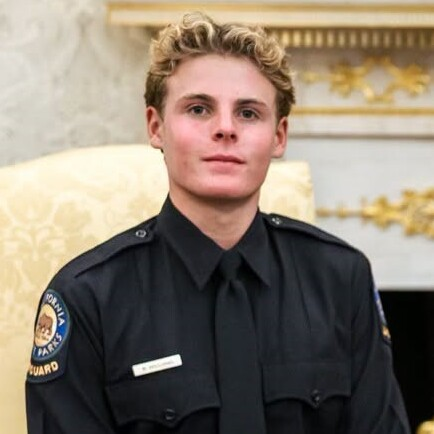
- American Ocean Lifeguard in 2026
- Born: 2010 (age 15–16); California, U.S.
- Occupation: Lifeguard
- Known for: Seabright State Beach rescue (2026)

Ryder Williams (born 2010) is an American seasonal ocean lifeguard with California State Parks. In July 2026, he participated in the rescue of a 10-year-old boy who was swept into hazardous surf at Seabright State Beach in Santa Cruz, California. Williams was later received at the White House by President Donald Trump alongside the boy he rescued.

== Early life ==
Williams grew up in Santa Cruz County, California, where he developed an interest in ocean swimming and surfing from an early age. He participated in the Santa Cruz Junior Guards program before completing the California State Parks lifeguard academy in 2026 and beginning work as a seasonal ocean lifeguard.

== 2026 Seabright State Beach rescue ==
On July 25, 2026, Williams was on duty as a seasonal California State Parks lifeguard at Seabright State Beach in Santa Cruz when hazardous surf generated by swells from Hurricane Genevieve affected the coastline. At approximately 3:30 p.m., a 10-year-old boy was knocked off his feet by a breaking wave and carried into deeper water by the surf.

Williams entered the water with a rescue buoy after requesting assistance by radio. He reached the child and kept him above the water while attempting to return to shore through heavy breaking waves. Fellow lifeguard Aaron Bohnen later joined the rescue, and together they brought the child safely back to the beach, where emergency medical personnel examined him before he was reunited with his family.

== Recognition ==
Following the rescue, Williams received public recognition from government officials and emergency response organizations. On July 28, 2026, U.S. President Donald Trump announced that Williams and his family would be invited to the White House in recognition of the rescue.

After the incident, Williams and his family asked members of the public not to create personal fundraising campaigns on his behalf. Instead, they encouraged those wishing to show support to donate to the Santa Cruz Junior Guards program, where Williams had trained before joining California State Parks.

On August 17, 2026, Williams and Nathaniel Rai, the boy he rescued, were received by President Trump at the White House and met with the president in the Oval Office. Lifeguard Aaron Bohnen, who assisted Williams during the rescue, also attended the meeting.

The White House meeting followed widespread coverage of the July rescue. Williams said his training helped him respond to the emergency, while Rai's family expressed gratitude for the rescue. The Washington Post reported that Williams had continued his duties after the rescue and described the incident as his first summer working as a California State Parks lifeguard.
