= Ruha Fifita =

Tongan-New Zealand visual artist

Ruha Fifita (born 1990 in Neiafu, Vava’u, Tonga) is a Tongan-New Zealand artist whose work spans multiple disciplines such as, a visual and performing artist, choreographer and cultural ambassador. Specialising in ngatu (painted tapa), Fifita's art is a blend of historical and contemporary iconography, weaving together patterns and references from the Pacific to Western Europe and the Middle East. Her work, "Ko e Hala Hangatonu: The Straight Path," explores themes of cultural identity and migration. Fifita's work addresses concerns about the impacts of climate change. Currently residing and working on Yugambeh Country in Logan City, Queensland.

== Career ==
Ruha Fifita is a multi-disciplinary, visual and performing artist, choreographer, cultural ambassador, born in 1990 in Neiafu, Vava’u, Tonga. She graduated with a degree in Creative Industries from the Queensland University of Technology, Brisbane. She also works as Curatorial Assistant for Pacific Art at the Queensland Art Gallery | Gallery of Modern Art.

Fifita was introduced to Ngatu, a traditional Tongan craft by her grandmother. A pivotal moment in Fifita's career came when she met contemporary Aotearoa artist Dame Robin White (Ngāti Awa, Pāhekā) in 2010. A series of collaborations began between the artists at galleries and festivals across Australasia and the Pacific. Together with White, she created projects aimed at exploring themes of prayer, conservation, collaboration, reciprocity, diversity, and unity.

Fifita primarily works with Ngatu, painted tapa, which has been showcased in venues such as the National Gallery of Victoria in Melbourne, Australia. She supports increasing youth voices and fostering a continued link to indigenous culture, believing it to be one of the region’s greatest strengths.

Fifita co-founded ON THE SPOT Inc. (OTS) in 2006. OTS is a community-based arts organisation for youth, familiarizing them with design and painting approaches.

In partnership with Penina Hitti, Ebonie Fifita, Sheida Vazir-Zadeh, and Minaira Fifita she co-leads the artist collective Ivi, which focuses on utilizing collective Indigenous arts practices to support community-building efforts. Their work has been exhibited internationally, including at the Seoul Museum of Art, Mori Art Museum in Tokyo, and the National Gallery of Victoria in Melbourne.

Fifita's art is deeply rooted in her exploration of spirituality, youth empowerment, and the role of artists in advancing civilization. Her ideas stem from her diverse cultural and spiritual background. Her personal identity also encompasses the Bahá'í faith and Welsh heritage, both of which inform her art practice.

Fifita was selected as a delegate for the 2022 Australia Council Biennale Delegates Program, exploring various Biennale engagement approaches within an Australian and regional context.

=== List of selected exhibitions ===
- "Ko e Hala Hangatonu: The Straight Path" by Robin White and Ruha Fifita. This piece of work also includes "‘I he 'api o 'eku Tamai/ In My Father’s House". It was shown at Pātaka Art + Museum on December 7, 2014 and at the Auckland Art Festival, Pataka Art Gallery, The National Gallery of Victoria, and the Tjibaou Cultural Centre.
- "We are the Small Axe" by Robin White and Ruha Fifita: - 2015 Purchased in 2019 by Christchurch Art Gallery Te Puna o Waiwhetū.
- ‘Ko e Ngoue Manongi (The Fragrant Garden)" - 52 Actions Project at the Penrith Regional Gallery, Sydney; Wangaratta Art Gallery, Wangaratta; and Jervis Bay Maritime Museum, 2022.
- "Wise men fish here" - McLeavy gallery, October 9, 2014.
- "Siu i Moana: Reaching Across the Ocean" exhibited at NGV International, Melbourne, June 10, 2016.
- "OFO HAKE: KOE NGATU TEUTEU 'O 'AKESA MO 'ISILELI FIFITA" - UNSW Galleries, January 17, 2020.
- "UN/LEARNING AUSTRALIA" - Seoul Museum of Art, Seoul (2021–22).
- "Another Energy", Mori Art Museum, Tokyo (2021).
- "Te Au: Liquid Constituencies" - at Govett-Brewster Art Gallery, December 3, 2022.
- "Ala Hagatonu, Always Song in the Water" - 2023 exhibition inspired by Gregory O'Brien's book, with Ruha Fifita choreographing, exploring the oceanic environment of Aotearoa.
- Ko e Mataliki 'o e Mo'ui (2024) – 18th Adelaide Biennial of Australian Art: Inner Sanctum, Art Gallery of South Australia, Adelaide.
