= Sosefo Fifita =

Tonga international rugby league footballer (born 2003)

Jojo Fifita
Personal information
- Full name: Sosefo JoJo Fifita
- Born: 8 January 2003 (age 23) Dunedin, New Zealand
- Height: 183 cm (6 ft 0 in)
- Weight: 91 kg (14 st 5 lb)

Playing information
- Position: Wing, Centre
Club
Years	Team	Pld	T	G	FG	P
2022–	Gold Coast Titans	78	35	0	0	140
Representative
Years	Team	Pld	T	G	FG	P
2022	Prime Minister's XIII	1	0	0	0	0
2024	Māori All Stars	1	0	0	0	0
2026	Queensland	3	2	0	0	8
2026–	Tonga	4	5	0	0	20
- Source: As of 20 November 2026
- Education: The Southport School
- Father: Pila Fifita
- Relatives: David Fifita (cousin)

Sosefo "Jojo" Fifita (born 8 January 2003) is a Tonga international rugby league footballer who plays as a winger or centre for the Gold Coast Titans in the NRL.

== Background ==
Fifita is the son of former Tongan rugby star Pila Fifita and is of Aboriginal heritage. His second cousin, David Fifita, plays for the South Sydney Rabbitohs but previously played with him at the Titans. At three years of age, Sosefo moved to Japan when his father agreed to play for Munakata Sanix Blues before the family moved to Brisbane two years later. At 10 years of age, the Fifita family settled on the Gold Coast where Sosefo played junior rugby union for the Southport Eagles. Sosefo attended The Southport School where played rugby union in the prestigious GPS competition and would score four tries in a single game with Wallabies Head Coach Dave Rennie in attendance. Fifita is also a former U15 national junior sprint champion over 100 metres.

== Playing career ==
=== 2022 ===
In June 2022, Fifita was selected for the Queensland Maroons U19s, starting at left centre in 32–4 loss to New South Wales Blues U19s. In round 18 of the 2022 NRL season, Fifita made his first grade debut for the Gold Coast against Brisbane, which the club lost 16–12.

=== 2023 ===
Fifita played a total of 14 matches for the Gold Coast in the 2023 NRL season and scored three tries as the club finished 14th on the table.

=== 2024 ===
Fifita made 19 appearances for the Gold Coast throughout the 2024 NRL season and scored ten tries as the club finished 14th on the table. On 26 November, it was announced that Fifita had re-signed until the end of the 2029 season.

=== 2025 ===
Fifita played 17 games for the Gold Coast in the 2025 NRL season and scored 11 tries as the club narrowly avoided the wooden spoon finishing 16th.

=== 2026 ===
He made his Queensland debut in Game 1 of the 2026 State of Origin on 27 May 2026 in the 22–20 defeat. Fifita played over 20 matches for the Gold Coast in the 2026 NRL season as the club finished 16th on the table. On 30 September 2026 the Titans announced that Fifita re-signed with the club until the end of 2029.

He made his Tonga international début in the 2026 Rugby League World Cup 12–30 win over England on 17 October 2026

== Statistics ==
Year	Team	Games	Tries	Pts
2022	Gold Coast Titans	8	3	12
2023	Gold Coast Titans	14	3	12
2024	Gold Coast Titans	19	10	40
2025	Gold Coast Titans	17	11	44
2026	Gold Coast Titans	20	8	32
2027	Gold Coast Titans			
	Totals	78	35	140
