= Jamayne Isaako =

New Zealand & Samoa international rugby league footballer

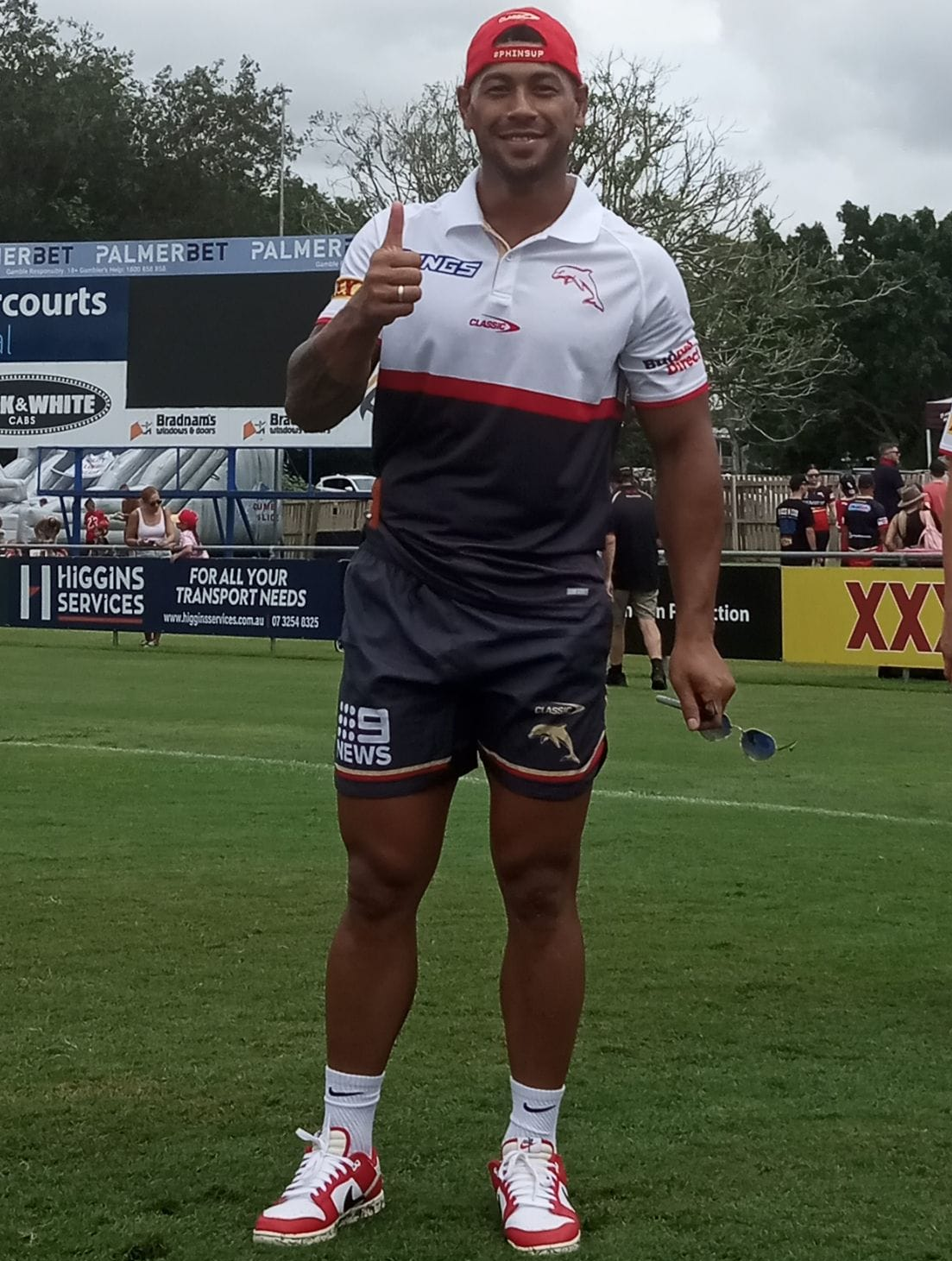

Personal information
- Born: 5 June 1996 (age 30) Christchurch, New Zealand
- Height: 180 cm (5 ft 11 in)
- Weight: 95 kg (14 st 13 lb)

Playing information
- Position: Wing, Fullback
Club
Years	Team	Pld	T	G	FG	P
2017–22	Brisbane Broncos	77	24	216	2	530
2022	Gold Coast Titans	11	3	15	0	42
2023–26	Dolphins	98	70	386	3	1055
2027–	Melbourne Storm	0	0	0	0	0
	Total	186	97	617	5	1627
Representative
Years	Team	Pld	T	G	FG	P
2018–	New Zealand	19	12	90	1	229
2019	Samoa	1	0	4	0	8
- Source: As of 17 November 2026

Jamayne Isaako (born 5 June 1996) is a professional rugby league footballer who plays as a winger for the Melbourne Storm in the NRL and has played for both New Zealand and Samoa at international level.

Isaako is contracted to the Melbourne Storm for the 2027 and 2028 National Rugby League (NRL) seasons.

As a goal-kicking winger, he played in all 98 matches for the Dolphins in the NRL from their inaugural game in 2023 to the end of their 2026 finals series.

On 20 June 2026, Isaako surpassed Steve Gearin's all-time premiership record of 94 consecutive games scoring points (1978–1982), extending his own streak to 95. In round 24 of 2026, Isaako scored 1000 club points for the fewest NRL games (93). In a 2026 preliminary final against the Sydney Roosters, he scored 12 points and became the fourth player in NRL history to score at least 300 points in a single season (including the finals series).

At the 2018, 2023, 2025 and 2026 Dally M Awards, Isaako was named as the "Top Pointscorer of the Year". He finished the 2026 NRL regular season with the highest points (288) scored, including the most goals (102) kicked.

At the 2023 Dally M Awards, Isaako also received the Ken Irvine Medal for being the "Top Tryscorer of the Year" and was named as Best Winger of the Year along with Dallin Watene-Zelezniak from the New Zealand Warriors. In the NRL, Isaako has previously played as a fullback for the Gold Coast Titans and on the wing for the Brisbane Broncos.

Internationally, he has represented both Samoa and New Zealand, winners of the Rugby League Pacific Championships in 2023 and 2025. Isaako is New Zealand's highest-ever international points scorer (229).

== Background ==
Isaako was born in Christchurch, New Zealand, and is of Samoan descent. He hails from the villages of Falelatai, Lalomanu and Lona Fagaloa. Isaako played junior rugby league for the Aranui Eagles.

== Playing career ==
=== Cronulla-Sutherland Sharks (NYC) ===
In 2014 and 2015, Isaako played at five-eighth for the Cronulla-Sutherland Sharks' NYC team. In May 2015, he also played fullback for the Junior Kiwis against the Junior Kangaroos.

=== Brisbane Broncos (2016–2022) ===
==== 2016–2017 ====
In 2016, Isaako joined the Brisbane Broncos Under 20's team in round 9. That May, he played for the Junior Kiwis against the Junior Kangaroos for a second consecutive year.

In 2017, Isaako played for the Broncos Queensland Cup team, Souths Logan Magpies. Form for the Magpies earned him an NRL debut in round 19 against the Newcastle Knights, starting at fullback in the 34–22 win at Hunter Stadium. It was his only Broncos appearance that season. Isaako remained in the Queensland Cup and was named as fullback in the Intrust Super Cup team of the season.

==== 2018 ====
In round 1 of the 2018 NRL season, Isaako played as a winger for the Broncos in their 34–12 loss to the St George Illawarra Dragons at Jubilee Stadium. In round 3, he kicked four penalty goals, including one in golden point extra time, and a field goal in the Broncos 9–7 win over the Wests Tigers at Campbelltown Stadium. In round 6 against the New Zealand Warriors, he scored his first two NRL tries in the Broncos' 27–18 win at Mt Smart Stadium. In Round 11 against the Sydney Roosters, Isaako scored two tries and kicked four goals. With two minutes remaining, he scored the match-winning try in the Broncos' 28–22 victory at Suncorp Stadium, after stepping past Roosters defenders when pressured while attempting a field goal.

After strong form in the NRL, Isaako started at fullback during rounds 19–21, with incumbent fullback Darius Boyd shifted to centre. He returned to the wing for the rest of season. On 19 July 2018, Isaako extended his contract with the Broncos to the end of the 2024 season, after rejecting a rich offer from the Sydney Roosters because he ultimately believed the Broncos offered the best opportunity to pursue his long-term goal of playing fullback. Isaako played in all twenty-five Broncos matches in the 2018 NRL season, scoring eleven tries and kicking ninety-seven goals to finish as the club's highest point scorer with 239 points. On 26 September 2018, at the 2018 Dally M Awards, he received the Rookie of the Year award and his match-winning try against the Sydney Roosters in round 11 was named as Try of the Year.

==== 2019–2022 ====
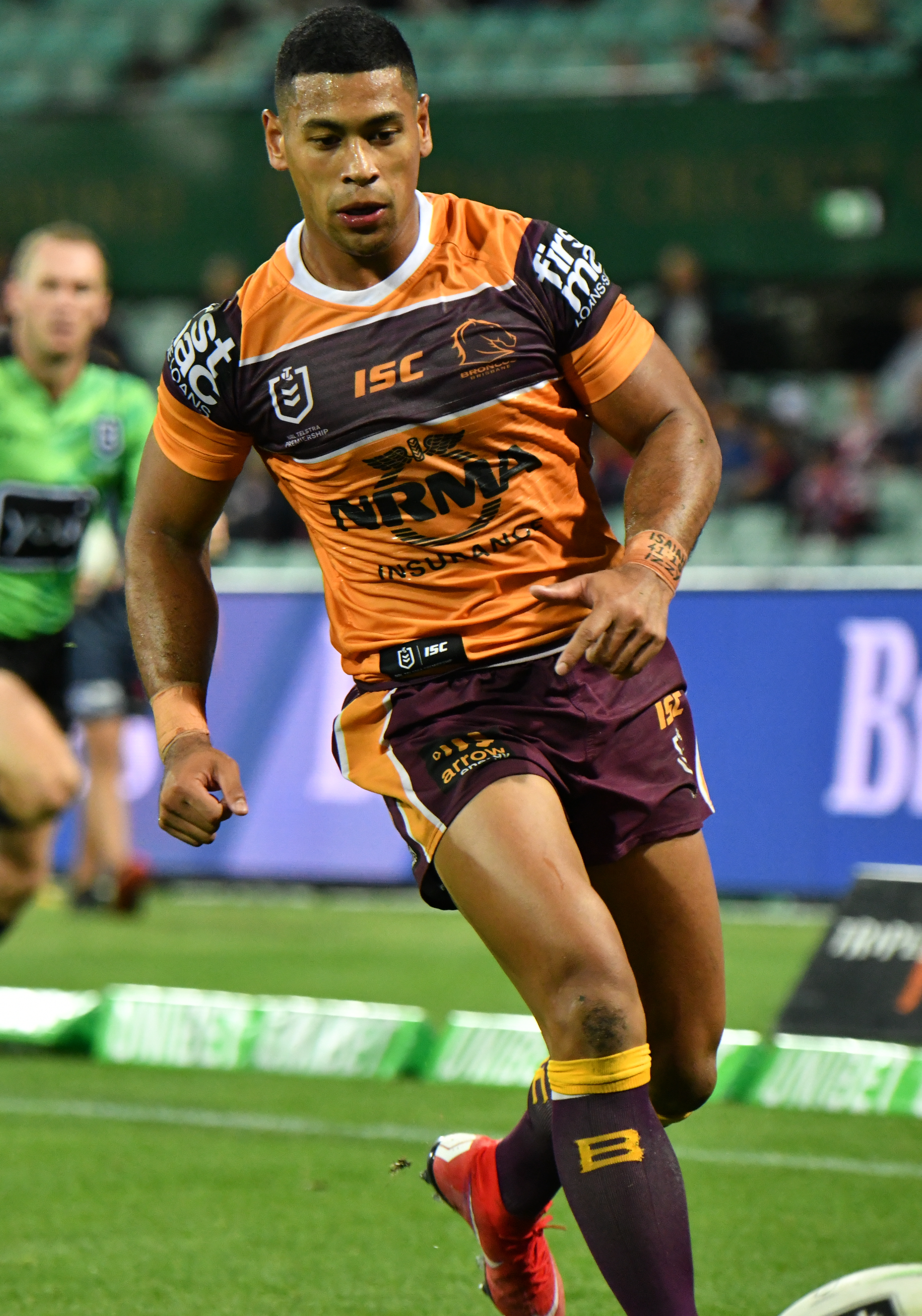
Isaako in 2019

In the 2019 NRL season, Isaako made errors as the Broncos started 2–6 before their round 9 Magic Round match against the Manly-Warringah Sea Eagles. Isaako on the wing and James Roberts at centre were dropped from the team for defensive and handling issues. Isaako returned to the wing the following week against the 2018 premiers, the Sydney Roosters, and kicked three goals in the 15–10 win at Suncorp Stadium.

In the 2020 NRL season, Isaako played only ten games for Brisbane. Following the death of his father (Taai) in New Zealand and COVID-19 quarantine restrictions, he was unable to return to Australia for the second half of the season. In round 8 of the 2021 NRL season, Isaako scored two tries and kicked five goals as Brisbane came from 22–0 down to defeat the Gold Coast 36–28. At the start of 2022 NRL season, Isaako played one match and kicked two goals for Brisbane.

=== Gold Coast Titans (2022) ===
On 22 March, Isaako signed a one-year contract with the Gold Coast Titans for the remainder of the season. He had been expected to sign a short-term contract with the Parramatta Eels, but chose Gold Coast to remain in Queensland before commencing with the Dolphins for their inaugural NRL season in 2023. In round 10, Isaako scored the winning try in Gold Coast's golden point victory over St. George Illawarra, ending a five-game losing streak.

=== Dolphins (2023–2026) ===
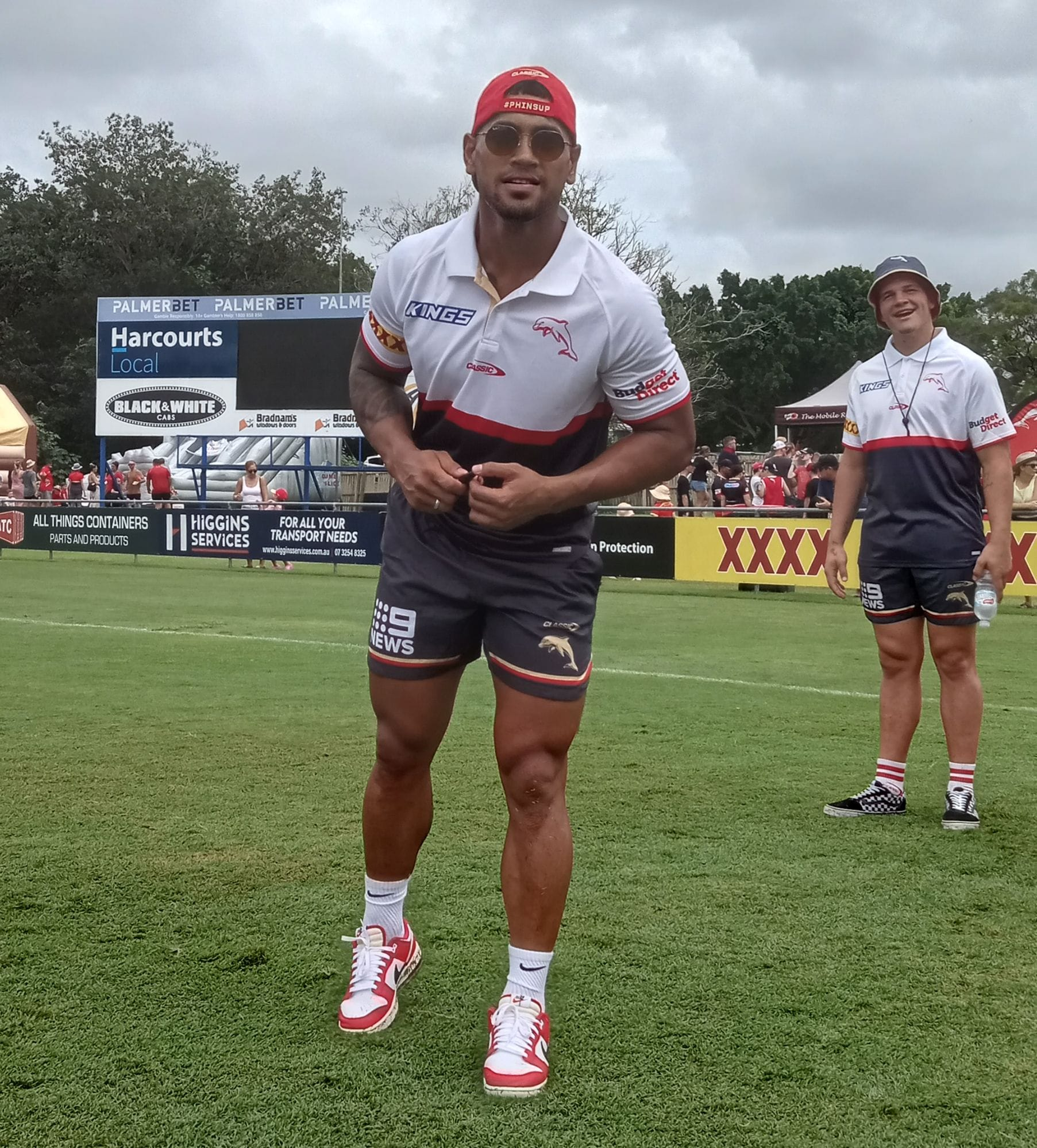
Isaako in Brisbane 2024

==== 2023 ====
Isaako commenced a three-year contract with the Dolphins in 2023, and played in every match that year. Even though the Dolphins did not qualify for the finals, Isaako recorded both the highest number of NRL tries and points in the 2023 competition; a feat last achieved by Canberra Raiders goal-kicking centre Mal Meninga in 1990.

In round 1 of the 2023 NRL season, Isaako made his club debut for the Dolphins on the wing in their inaugural NRL game. He scored two tries and kicked four goals as the new club pulled off a major upset defeating the Sydney Roosters 28–18 at Suncorp Stadium. In round 2, Isaako kicked four goals in the Dolphins 20–14 defeat of the Canberra Raiders at Kayo Stadium. In round 3, Isaako scored two tries and kicked four goals in a 36–20 victory over the Newcastle Knights at McDonald Jones Stadium. In round 4, Isaako kicked two goals in the inaugural "Battle for Brisbane" derby at Suncorp Stadium, which the Brisbane Broncos won 18–12. In round 5, he scored one try and kicked two goals in the Dolphins 12–38 loss to St George Illawarra Dragons at WIN Stadium.

In round 6, Isaako kicked four goals and scored his first career hat-trick in the Dolphins 32–22 victory against the North Queensland Cowboys at Queensland Country Bank Stadium. In round 7, he kicked three goals in the Dolphins 14–36 loss to South Sydney Rabbitohs at Suncorp Stadium. In round 8, Isaako kicked four goals in the Dolphins 28–26 victory over the Gold Coast Titans at Suncorp Stadium. In round 9, Isaako kicked five goals in the Dolphins 30–31 loss to the Canberra Raiders at McDonalds Park, Wagga Wagga. In round 10 against the Cronulla Sutherland Sharks at Suncorp Stadium, Isaako kicked six goals for the Dolphins in their 36–16 victory at Suncorp Stadium. In round 12, he scored two tries and kicked two goals for the Dolphins in their 16–24 loss to the Melbourne Storm at Suncorp Stadium. Round 13 was Isaako's one-hundredth NRL game; he scored two tries and kicked five goals for the Dolphins in their 26–12 victory over the St. George Illawarra Dragons at Kayo Stadium. In round 23, Isaako scored a hat-trick in the club's 30–28 loss to the Newcastle Knights at Optus Stadium, Perth.

By the end of the 2023 season, Isaako had scored twenty-four tries and kicked seventy-three goals with a goal conversion rate of 72.3% and a tackle efficiency of 76.9%. At the Dolphins' Inaugural Presentation Ball held at Brisbane Convention and Exhibition Centre, he was awarded the Arthur Beetson Medal Player of the Year as well as the Best Back, the Most Consistent, and the Players' Player awards for 2023. At the 2023 Dally M Awards held at Royal Randwick Racecourse in Sydney, Isaako was awarded the Ken Irvine Medal for being the "Top Tryscorer of the Year", named as the "Top Pointscorer of the Year" and Winger of the Year. The Dolphins extended Isaako's contract until the end of 2026.

==== 2024 ====
In the 2024 NRL season, Isaako played all twenty-four games for the Dolphins and they finished 10th on the table. In round 9, he scored a hat-trick and kicked four goals in the Dolphins 28–26 victory over North Queensland. Isaako finished the season as the club's top point scorer and the second highest NRL point-scorer for that year.

==== 2025 ====
Despite finishing the 2025 NRL season in ninth place and missing the finals, the Dolphins scored the most points (721) of any team. With 278 points, Isaako played all Dolphins games and individually recorded the highest points in the competition.

==== 2026 ====
On 29 March 2026, the Melbourne Storm announced Isaako had agreed to join them on a two-year contract from 2027, leaving the Dolphins at the end of the 2026 NRL season. In round 10 of 2026, Isaako scored three tries and kicked six goals in the Dolphins 44–12 win over the Canterbury-Bankstown Bulldogs at Suncorp Stadium. This equalled Isaako's own NRL and Dolphins club record for most points (24) in a game, a record he previously set against the St. George Illawarra Dragons in round 14 2025.

In round 15 against the Sydney Roosters, Isaako played with a dislocated finger and equalled Steve Gearin’s all-time premiership record of scoring points in his 94th consecutive match. Isaako surpassed this record in the next round on 20 June against the Wests Tigers. In round 24, Isaako scored 1000 club points for the fewest NRL games (93); this broke the 1981 record (98) of Michael Cronin (Parramatta Eels). At season end, Isaako was the 2026 top points (288) scorer in the NRL. He kicked an additional five goals worth 10 points in Finals Week 1 against the New Zealand Warriors. On 25 September against the Sydney Roosters in a preliminary final, Isaako scored twelve points to finish on 310 points (including the finals series) and became the fourth player in NRL history to score at least 300 points in a single season. This was achieved in his 98th and last match for the Dolphins club.

=== Melbourne Storm (2027–2028) ===
Isaako is contracted to the Melbourne Storm for the 2027 and 2028 NRL seasons.

== International career ==
Isaako played for the Junior Kiwis against the Junior Kangaroos in May of 2015 and 2016.

His international debut for the New Zealand men's team was in Denver, USA on 24 June 2018 against England; starting on the wing and kicking three goals in the 18–36 loss at Mile High Stadium. On 1 October 2018, Isaako was named in the New Zealand squad for their tour of Great Britain. He played in one match, which was the last of the three matches against England, playing on the wing in the 34–0 win at Elland Road in Leeds.

In 2019, Isaako played one match for Samoa to honour his father's island heritage.

In October 2023, Isaako was selected to represent New Zealand in the 2023 Pacific Championships. He finished with 42 points across three Tests, including 18 points in New Zealand's 30–0 win over Australia in the Pacific Championship Cup final at Waikato Stadium in Hamilton, New Zealand. Isaako also represented New Zealand in all of their 2024 and victorious 2025 Pacific Championships matches.

In October and November 2026, Isaako represented New Zealand in the 2026 Rugby League World Cup (RLWC); he kicked five goals (10 points) in the 24-22 round 1 loss to Australia. In round 2, Isaako scored three tries and kicked thirteen goals (a total of 38 points) in the 82-16 win over the Cook Islands.This surpassed the New Zealand record (32 points) by Tasesa Lavea in 2000 for the most points in a single match. In RLWC 2026 round 3, Isaako kicked thirteen goals (26 points) in the 78-0 win over Fiji. Then in the 34-10 semi-final win over Tonga, Isaako kicked five goals (10 points). In the RLWC final against Australia, Isaako kicked two goals (4 points) and surpassed Shaun Johnson's record (225) as New Zealand's highest-ever international points (229) scorer. He finished as the 2026 tournament's highest points (88) scorer.

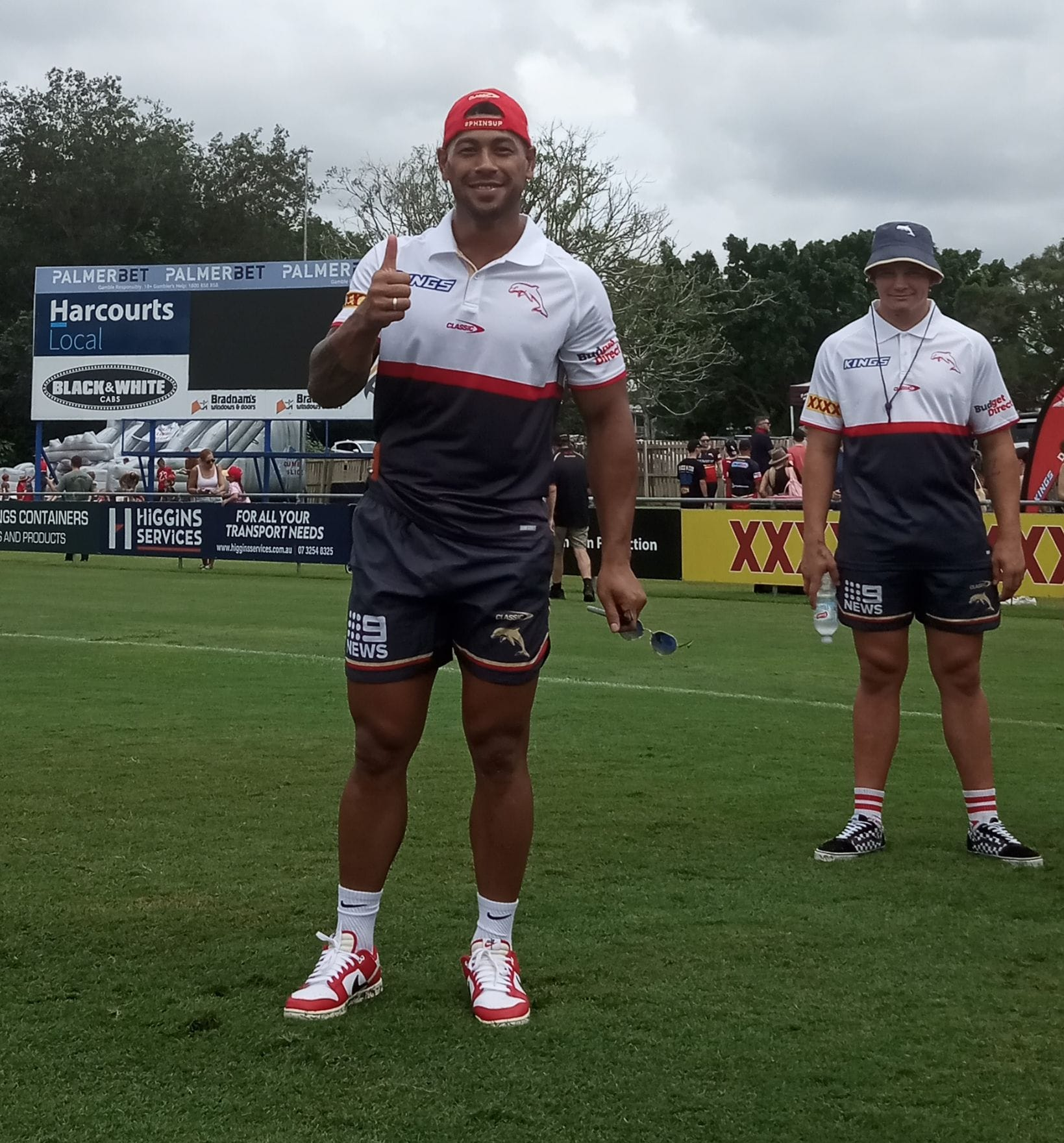
Isaako in Brisbane 2024

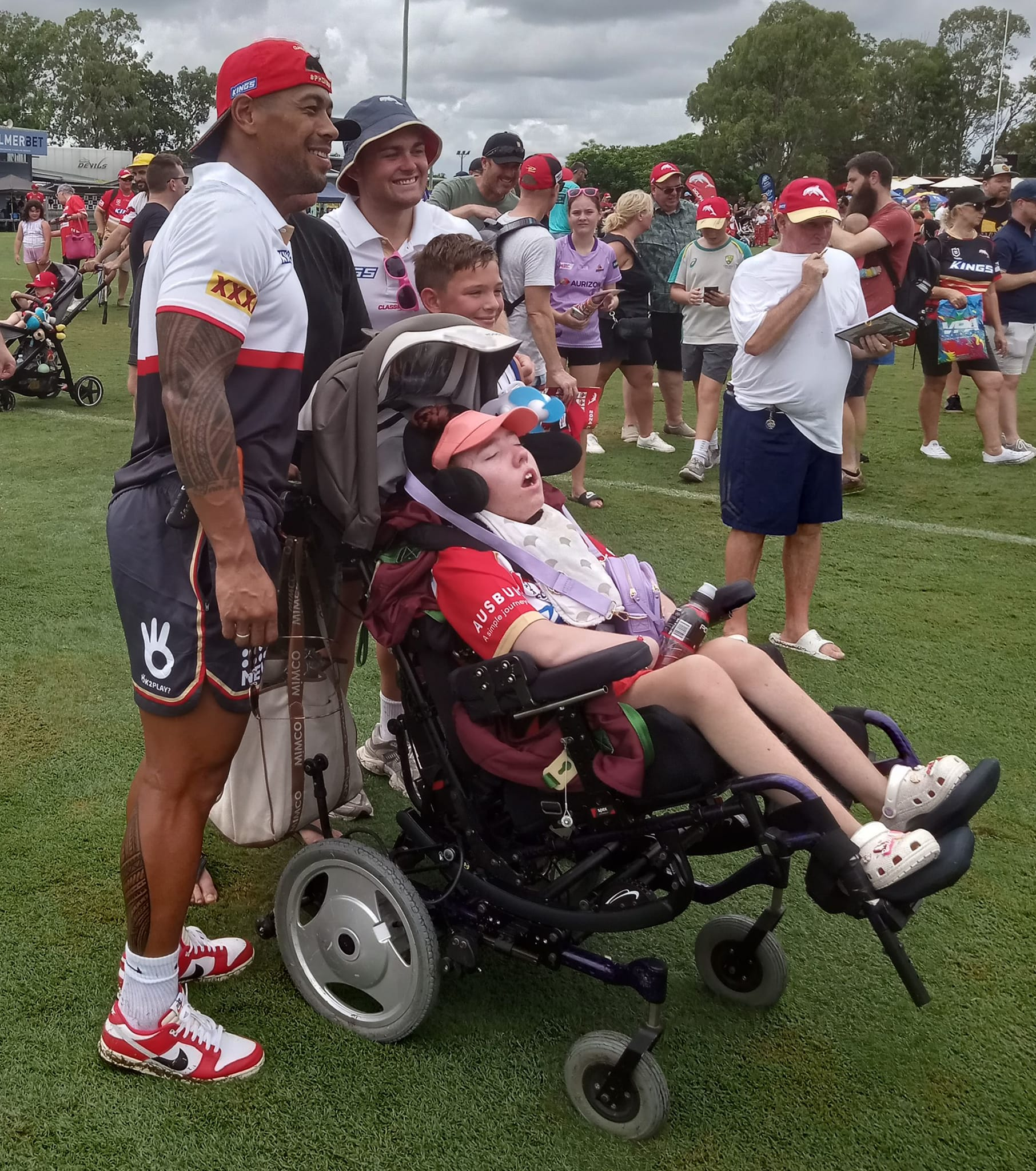
Isaako with fans

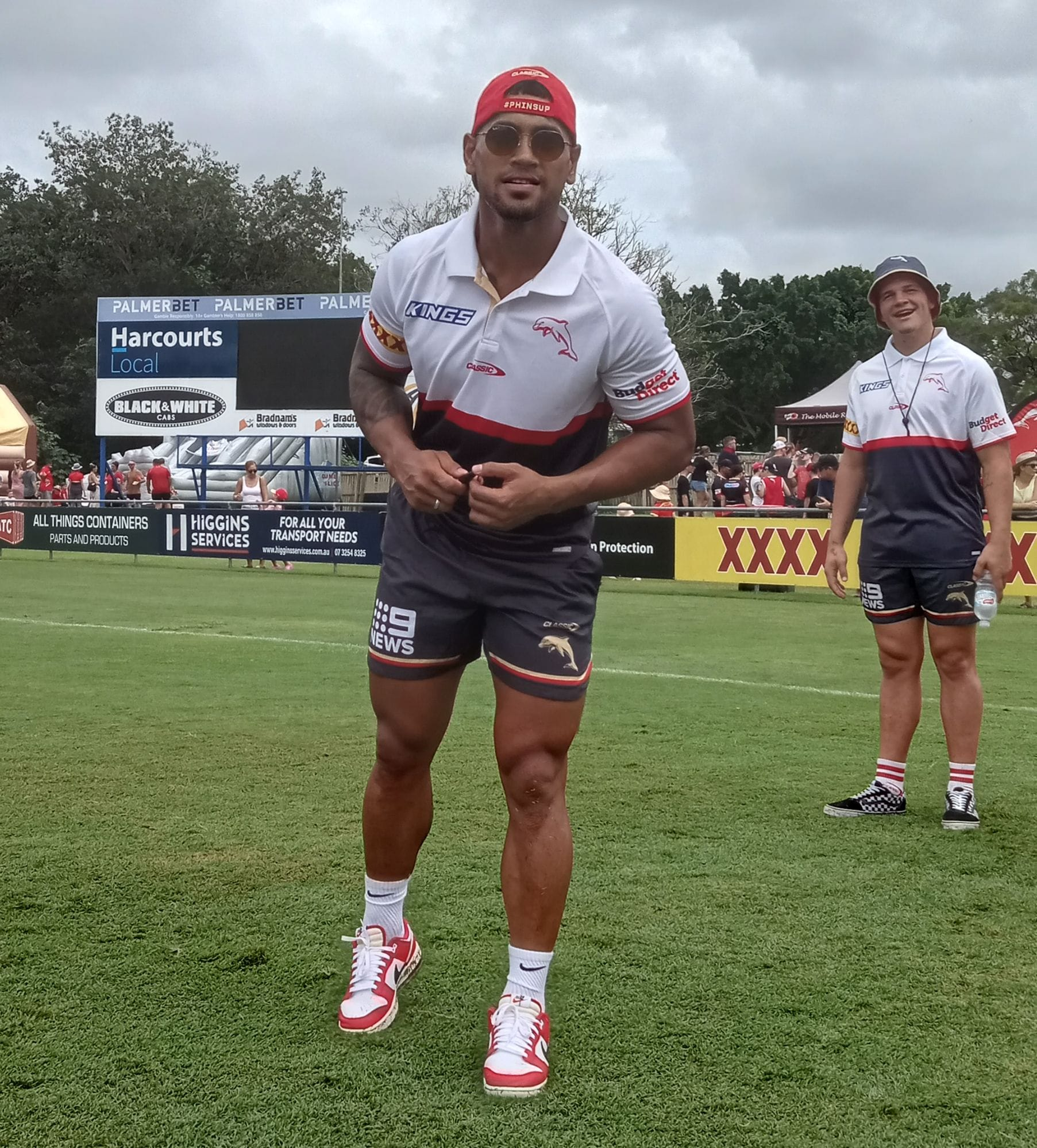
Isaako in Brisbane

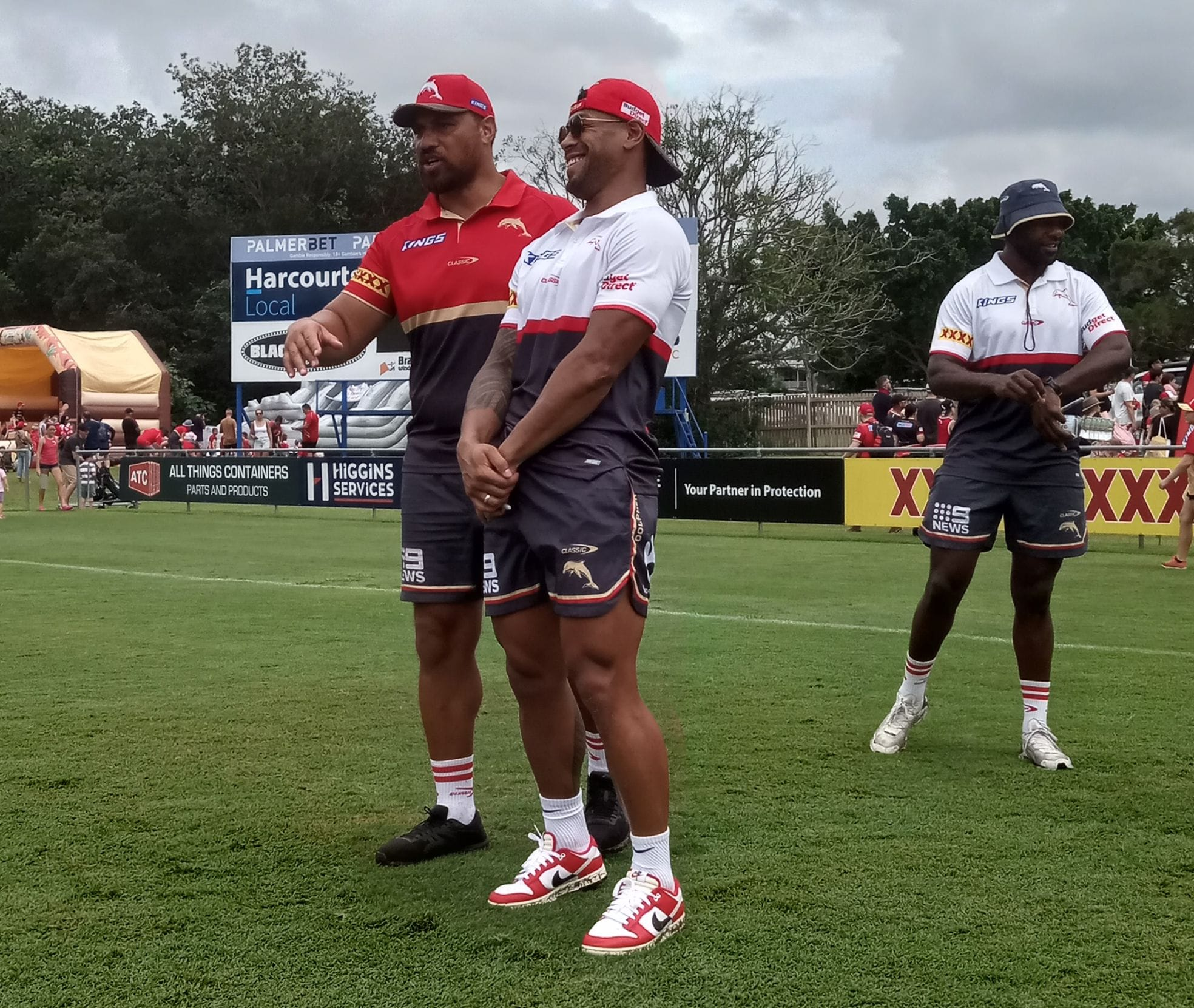
Isaako laughing

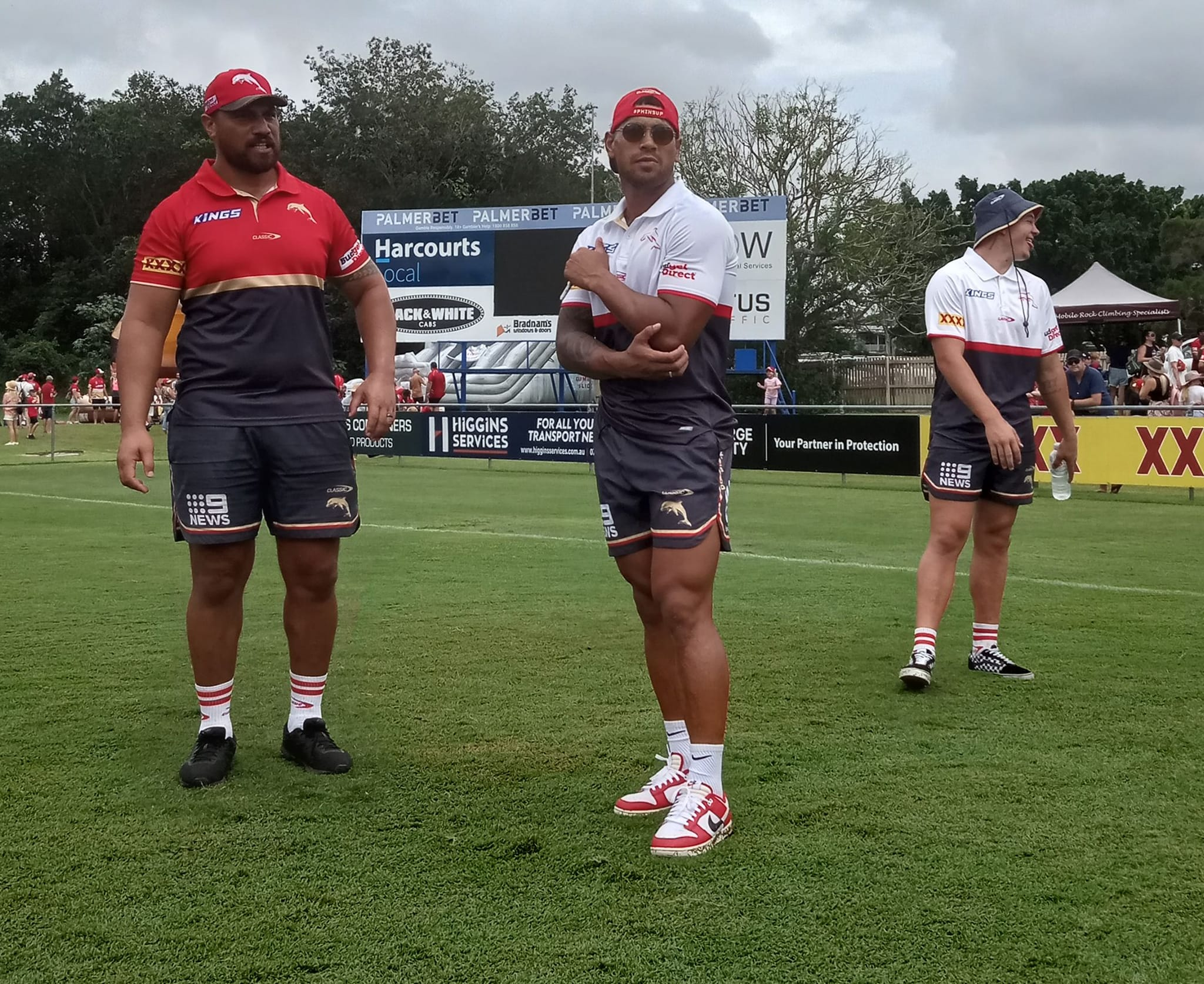
Isaako holding elbow

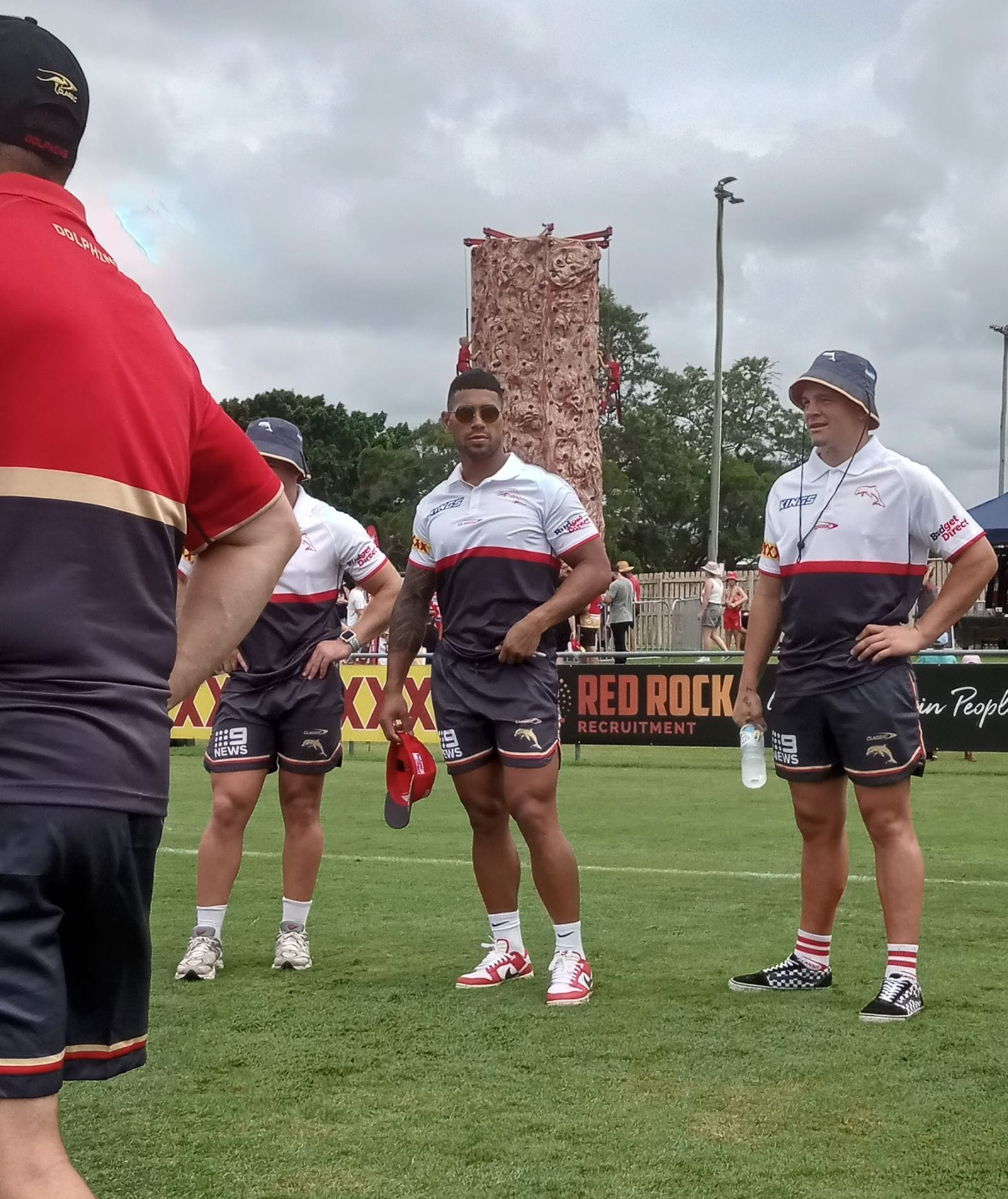
Isaako in the middle

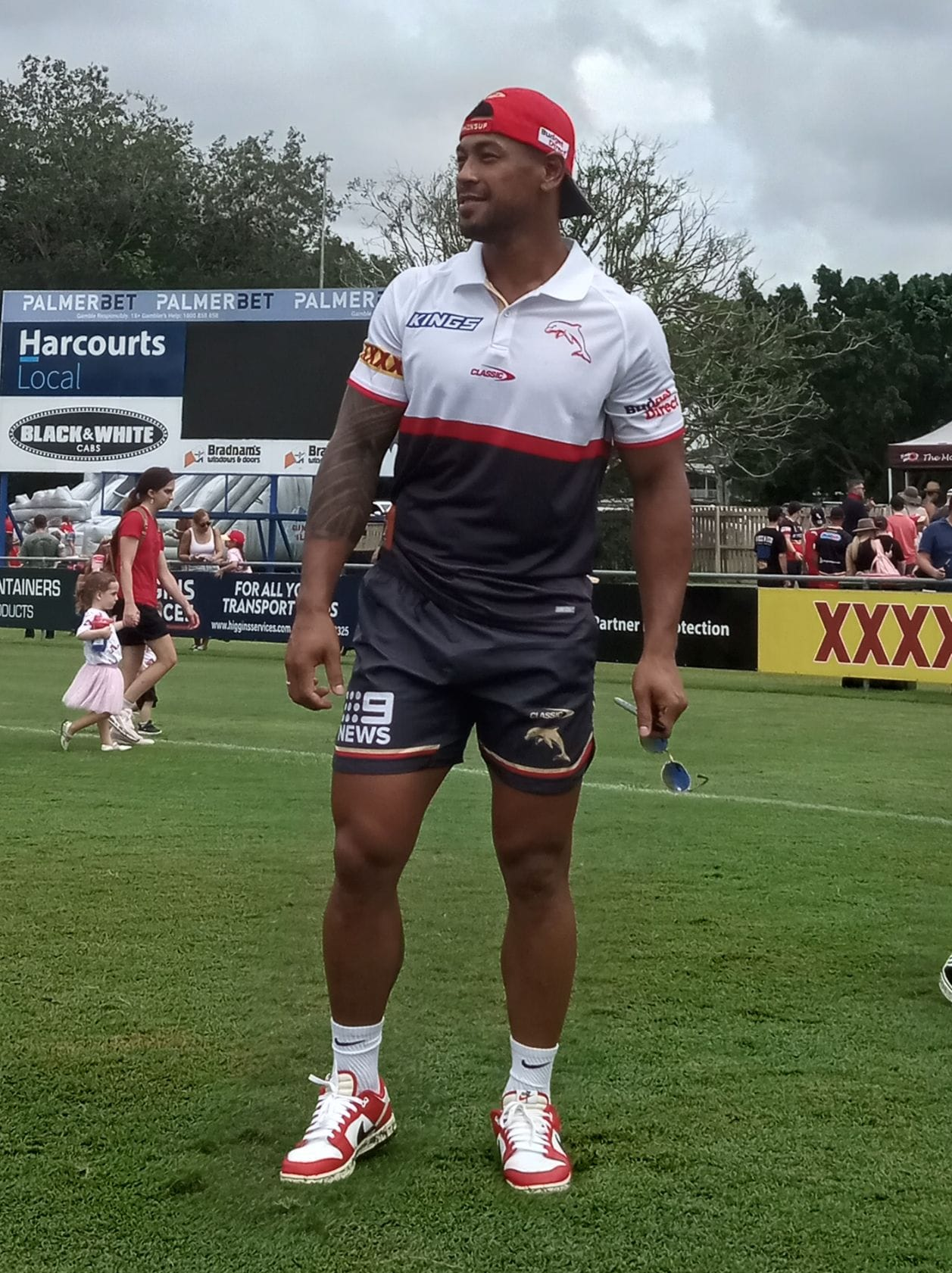
Isaako NRL January 2024

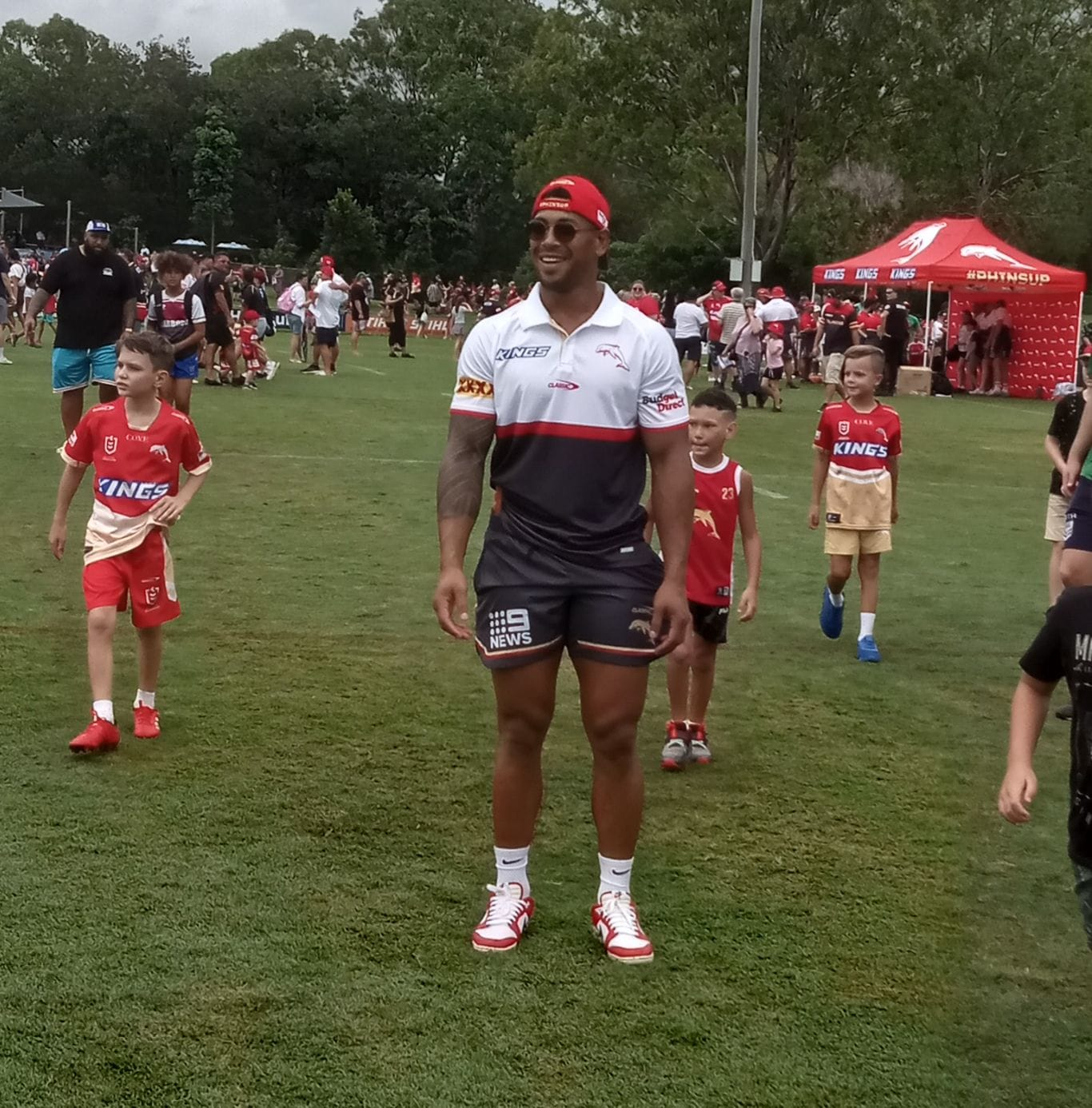
Isaako playing touch footy with kids

== Achievements and honours ==
Individual

- Dally M

Rookie of the Year: 2018
Try of the Year: 2018
Best Winger of the Year: 2023
Top Pointscorer of the Year: 2018, 2023, 2025, 2026
Top Tryscorer of the Year: 2023 (Ken Irvine Medal)

- Dolphins (NRL)

Arthur Beetson Medal Player of the Year: 2023
Best Back: 2023
Most Consistent: 2023
Players' Player: 2023

- National Rugby League

Highest number of NRL tries (24) and points (244) in a season: 2023
Highest number of NRL points (278) in a season: 2025
Highest number of NRL points (288) in a season: 2026
All-time NRL premiership record of scoring points in ninety-seven consecutive matches (Rd 18 2026).
Fewest NRL games (93) for 1000 club points (Rd 24 2026).
Fourth player in NRL history to score more than 300 points (310) in a single season (including finals series)

- New Zealand Kiwis

Highest-ever points (38) for NZ in a match: 2026 RLWC (Rd 2)
Highest-ever international career points (229) scorer for New Zealand: (2026 RLWC final)
Highest points (88) scorer in the 2026 Men's Rugby League World Cup tournament

Team

- New Zealand Kiwis

Pacific Champions: 2023, 2025

== Career statistics ==
Season	Team	Appearances	Tries	Goals	Goal-kicking percentage	Field goals	Points
2017 NRL season	Brisbane Broncos	1					0
2018 NRL season	Brisbane Broncos	25	11	97/118	82.20%	1	239
2019 NRL season	Brisbane Broncos	22	4	53/67	79.10%	1	123
2020 NRL season	Brisbane Broncos	10	3	16/22	72.73%	0	44
2021 NRL season	Brisbane Broncos	18	6	50/63	79.37%	0	124
2022 NRL season	Brisbane Broncos	1	0	1/2	50.00%	0	2
2022 NRL season	Gold Coast Titans	11	3	15/18	83.33%	0	42
2023 NRL season	Dolphins	24	24	73/101	72.28%	2	244
2024 NRL season	Dolphins	24	12	87/109	79.82%	1	223
2025 NRL season	Dolphins	24	11	117/133	87.97%	0	278
2026 NRL season	Dolphins	26 (Finals Wk 3)	23	109/121	90.08%	0	310
2027 NRL season	Melbourne Storm						
	Totals	186	97	627		5	1,629

== Personal life ==
Isaako and his partner Abby Sutherland, a former legal secretary from Melbourne, have two children. On 26 October 2018, their son was born at Mater Mother's Hospital in South Brisbane, Australia, and their daughter was born on 23 February 2021.
