= Jayden Campbell =

Australian rugby league footballer (born 2000)

Personal information
- Born: 7 February 2000 (age 26) Cronulla, New South Wales, Australia
- Height: 183 cm (6 ft 0 in)
- Weight: 80 kg (12 st 8 lb)

Playing information
- Position: Fullback, Halfback, Five-eighth
Club
Years	Team	Pld	T	G	FG	P
2021–	Gold Coast Titans	100	38	169	0	490
Representative
Years	Team	Pld	T	G	FG	P
2025–26	Indigenous All Stars	2	0	0	0	0
2025	Prime Minister's XIII	1	0	0	0	0
- Source: As of 4 September 2026
- Education: Helensvale State High School
- Father: Preston Campbell
- Relatives: Nathan Blacklock (cousin); Greg Inglis (cousin)

Jayden Campbell (born 7 February 2000) is an Australian professional rugby league footballer who plays as a halfback or fullback for the Gold Coast Titans in the National Rugby League.

== Background ==
Campbell was born in Cronulla, Sydney, New South Wales, into a family of Indigenous Australian (Kamilaroi) and Danish descent. In 2006, at six years of age, he moved with his family to the Gold Coast, Queensland, when his professional rugby league-playing father, Preston, became the first player to sign with the newly established Gold Coast Titans and was later honoured with the club's first ever Life Membership. The Campbell family also shares a relation with former Queensland captain Greg Inglis who is a cousin of theirs. Jayden played his junior rugby league on the Gold Coast for the Helensvale Hornets and attended Helensvale State High School throughout his upbringing. The Gold Coast Titans signed Campbell to an NRL development contract at 19 years of age. His State of Origin eligibility for Queensland was confirmed in August 2021.

== Playing career ==
=== Early career ===
In 2018, Campbell played for the Burleigh Bears in the Mal Meninga Cup, before moving up to their Hastings Deering Colts side later that season.

In 2019, he scored 24 tries in 21 games for the Bears' Colts side and won the club's Best & Fairest award. In 2020, he joined the Titans' NRL squad on a development contract.

=== 2021 ===
Campbell began the 2021 season playing for the Tweed Heads Seagulls in the Queensland Cup.

In Round 13 of the 2021 NRL season, Campbell made his first grade debut for the Gold Coast against the Melbourne Storm.

=== 2022 ===
On 9 June, Campbell was ruled out for eight weeks with a high grade hamstring tear during the Gold Coast's loss against North Queensland. In round 20 of the 2022 NRL season, Campbell scored two tries for the Gold Coast in their 36-24 loss against Canberra which left the club sitting bottom of the table. Campbell played a total of 14 games for the club in the 2022 season as the club finished 13th on the table.

=== 2023 ===
Campbell played a total of 22 games for the season. Campbell's season was ended after he dislocated his patella in the Titans round 25 loss to Penrith.

=== 2024 ===
Campbell made his first start of the season for the Gold Coast in round 4 against the Dolphins. Following the clubs 21-20 golden point extra-time loss against Canberra it was announced that Campbell would be ruled out for at least a month with a leg injury. In round 16 Campbell broke Scott Prince's club record of 20 points in a match with Campbell scoring 26 points in the Gold Coast's 66-6 win against the Warriors. Campbell played 15 games for the Gold Coast throughout the 2024 season as the club finished 14th on the table.

=== 2025 ===
Campbell played a total of 20 matches for the Gold Coast in the 2025 NRL season as the club narrowly avoided the wooden spoon on for and against finishing 16th.

On 12 October 2025 he played in the 28-10 Prime Minister's XIII win over PNG Prime Minister's XIII in Port Moresby On 21 November 2025, the Titans announced that Campbell had re-signed with the club until the end of 2031.

=== 2026 ===
Campbell played 22 matches for the Gold Coast in the 2026 NRL season as the club finished 16th on the table.

== Statistics ==
Year	Team	Games	Tries	Goals	Pts
2021	Gold Coast Titans	7	5		20
2022	Gold Coast Titans	14	4		16
2023	Gold Coast Titans	22	5	5	30
2024	Gold Coast Titans	15	5	34	88
2025	Gold Coast Titans	20	7	65	158
2026	Gold Coast Titans	21	10	61	162
	Totals	99	36	165	474
