= Ken Irvine Medal =

Annual rugby league award in Australia and New Zealand

- Sport: Rugby league
- League: National Rugby League
- Awarded for: Most tries in the NRL season
- Country: Australia, New Zealand

History
- First award: 2018 (Note: Replaced Dally M Award for Leading try scorer)
- Editions: 9 (as of 2026)
- First winner: David Fusitu'a ( New Zealand Warriors)
- Most wins: Alex Johnston ( South Sydney Rabbitohs)
- Most recent: Alex Johnston ( South Sydney Rabbitohs); Thomas Jenkins ( Penrith Panthers)

The Ken Irvine Medal is a rugby league award given annually to the National Rugby League (NRL) player who scores the most tries during the season.

The medal is presented annually at the Dally M Awards ceremony.

== History ==
The medal was first presented in 2018 to the New Zealand Warriors's David Fusitu'a; replacing the Dally M Award presented to the leading try scorer each season. The medal is named after Ken Irvine a prolific try-scorer during his career. Irvine held the Australian first grade rugby league record of 212 tries from 236 appearances in a career stretching from 1958–1973. His record stood until the 2026 NRL season when South Sydney Rabbitohs winger Alex Johnston took over the mantle as the leading tryscoring in Australian rugby league.

Following Johnston passing Irvine as the league's top try scorer, South Sydney CEO Blake Solly pushed for the medal to be renamed the Irvine-Johnston Medal.

Johnston won his fourth medal in 2026, scoring a career-high 30 tries to tie with Thomas Jenkins. It was the first time since 1954 that any player had scored 30 or more tries during the season.

== Recipients ==
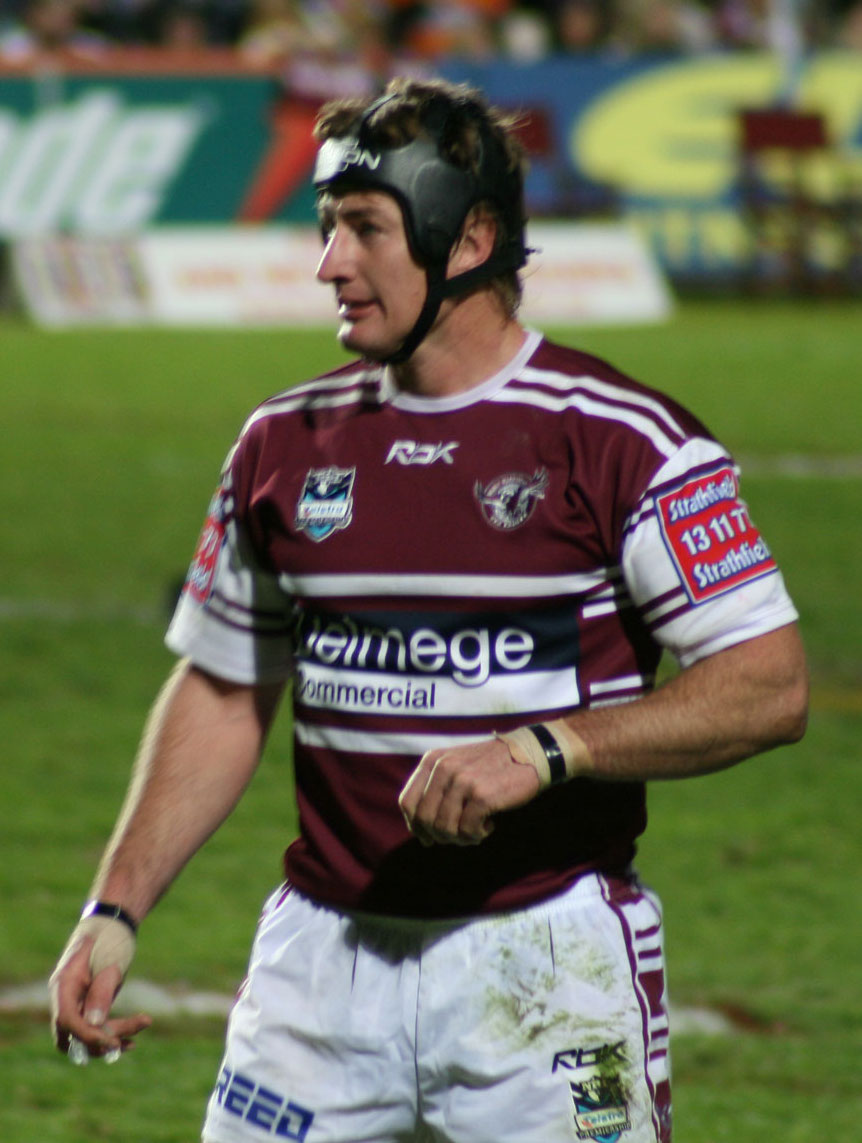
Steve Menzies was twice leading try scorer, topping the leaderboard during the 1995 ARL season and tieing for the lead in the 1998 NRL season.

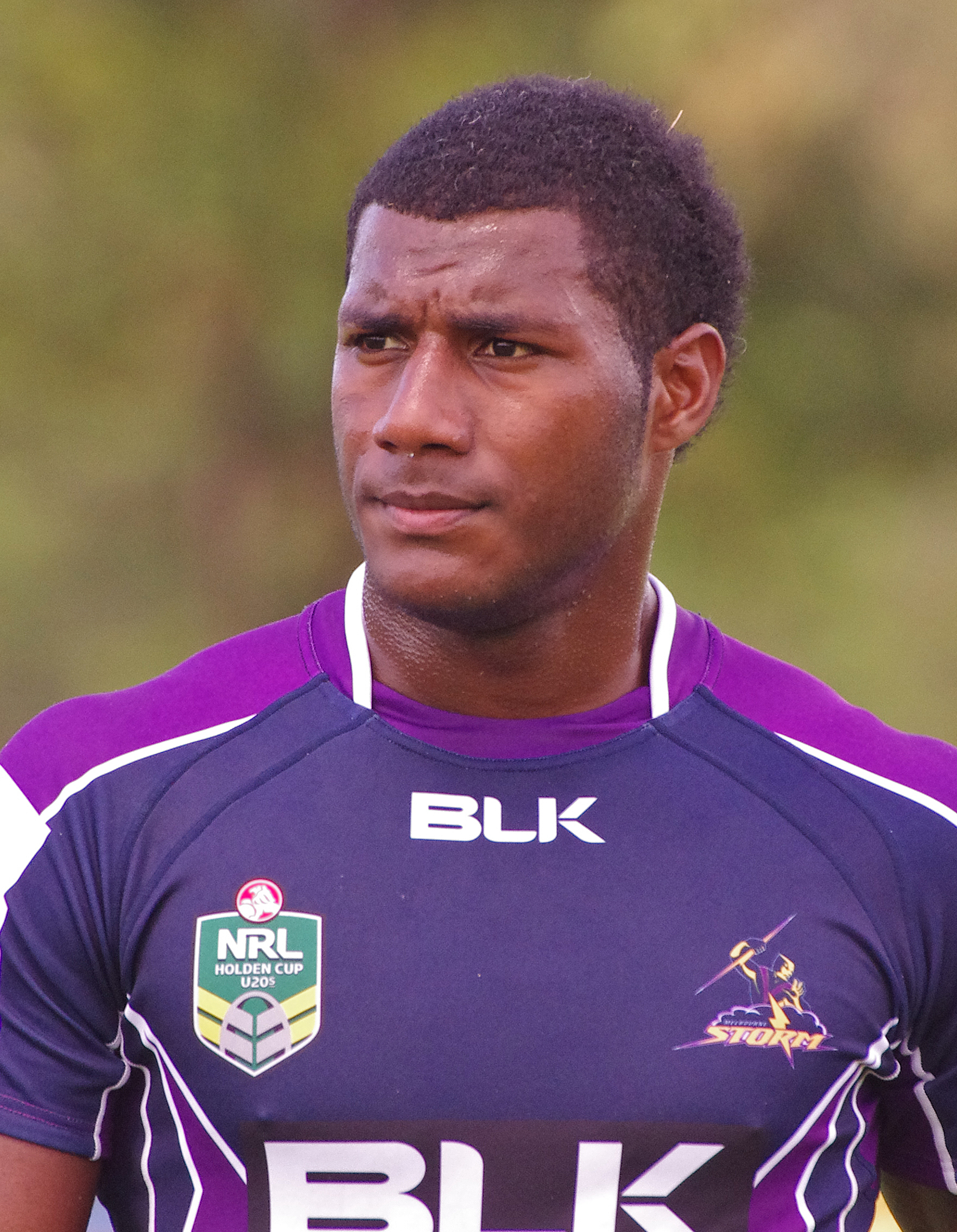
Melbourne Storm winger Suliasi Vunivalu was the leading try scorer in 2016 and 2017.

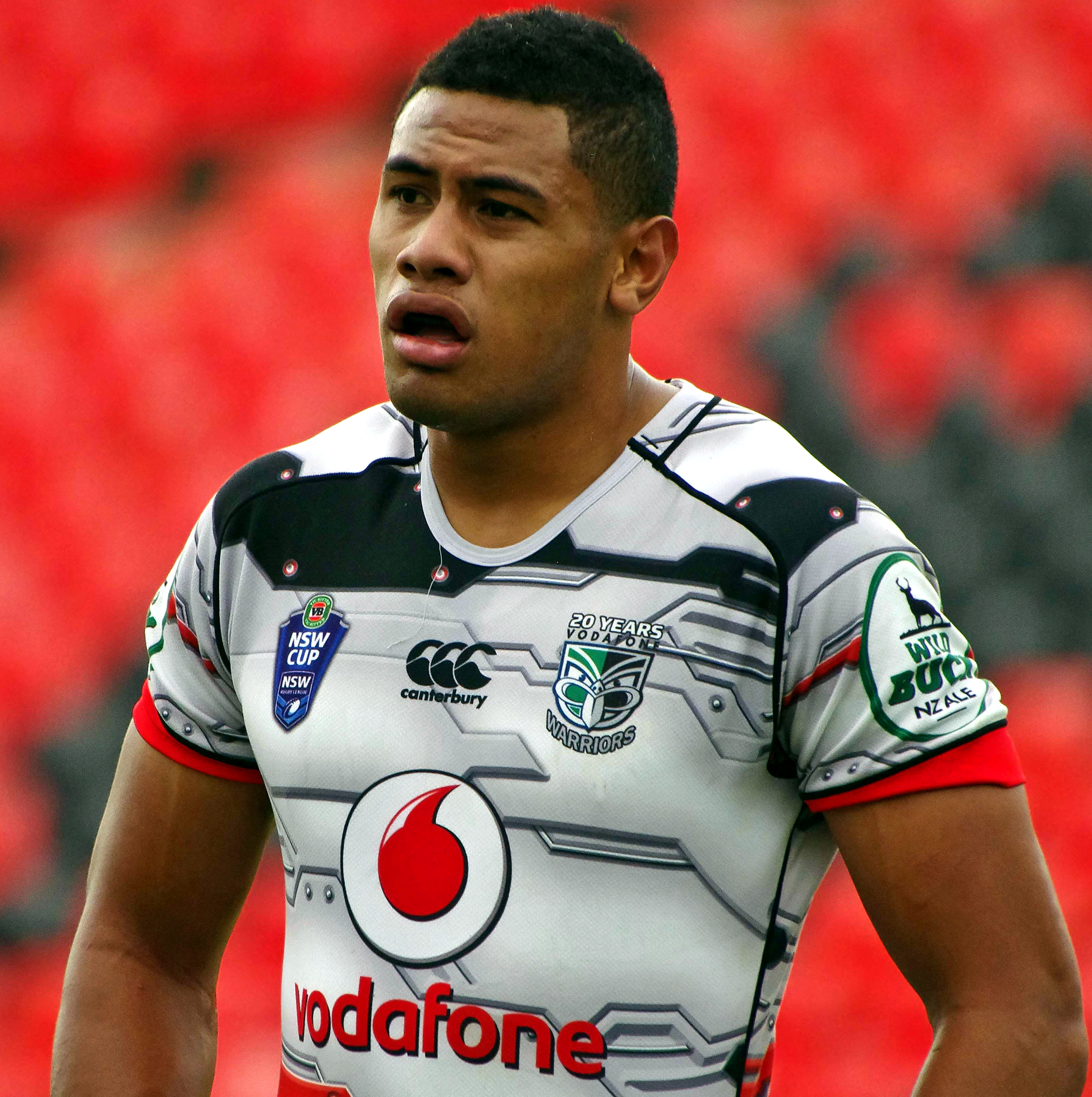
David Fusitu'a was the leading try scorer in the 2018 NRL season and the first recipient of the Ken Irvine Medal.

Note: Leading try scorers 1908–2017 in NRL and predecessor competitions, Ken Irvine Medalists from 2018

Leading try scorer (premiership season only) (Note: Excluding finals and playoff matches)
Season	Recipient	Club	Tries	Notes	Ref.
1908	Horrie Miller	Eastern Suburbs	10	(Note: Miller scored an additional five tries during the 1908 finals series)	
1909	Tommy Anderson	South Sydney	9	(Note: Anderson scored an additional two tries during the 1909 finals series)	
1909	William Bailey	Newcastle	9	(Note: Anderson scored an additional two tries during the 1909 finals series)	
1910	Arthur McCabe	South Sydney	17	(Note: Sources conflict as to whether McCabe scored 17 or 18 tries during the 1910 season)	
1911	Dave Garlick	Glebe	13		
1912	Roy Algie	Glebe	12		
1913	Harold Horder	South Sydney	12		
1914	Harold Horder (2)	South Sydney	19		
1915	Frank Burge	Glebe	20		
1916	Frank Burge (2)	Glebe	22		
1917	Harold Horder (3)	South Sydney	17		
1918	Frank Burge (3)	Glebe	24		
1919	Gordon Wright	Eastern Suburbs	17		
1920	Gordon Wright (2)	Eastern Suburbs	18		
1921	Gordon Wright (3)	Eastern Suburbs	11		
1922	Cec Blinkhorn	North Sydney	18	(Note: Blinkhorn scored two additional tries in the 1922 playoff final)	
1923	Herman Peters	North Sydney	16		
1924	Tommy Kennedy	Balmain	10		
1925	Benny Wearing	South Sydney	12		
1926	Benny Wearing (2)	South Sydney	14		
1927	Benny Wearing (3)	South Sydney	16	(Note: Wearing scored three additional tries during the 1927 finals series)	
1928	Tony Redmond	Western Suburbs	9		
1929	Alan Brady	Western Suburbs	11		
1930	Morrie Boyle	Eastern Suburbs	14	(Note: Boyle scored one additional try during the 1930 finals series)	
1931	Jack Lynch	Eastern Suburbs	16		
1932	Alan Ridley	Western Suburbs	16	(Note: Ridley scored two additional tries during the 1932 finals series)	
1933	Jack Gray-Spence	University	11		
1934	Fred Gardner	St. George	11	(Note: Dave Brown and Vic Hey each scored one additional try during the 1934 finals series to equal Gardner)	
1935	Dave Brown	Eastern Suburbs	38		
1936	Fred Tottey	Eastern Suburbs	22	(Note: Tottey scored three additional tries during the 1936 finals series)	
1937	Fred Tottey (2)	Eastern Suburbs	10		
1938	Don Manson	South Sydney	12	(Note: Manson scored an additional try during the 1938 finals series)	
1938	Athol Stewart	Newtown	12	(Note: Manson scored an additional try during the 1938 finals series)	
1939	Sid Goodwin	Balmain	16	(Note: Goodwin scored two additional tries during the 1939 finals series, while Hazelton scored one additional try)	
1939	Charlie Hazelton	St. George	16	(Note: Goodwin scored two additional tries during the 1939 finals series, while Hazelton scored one additional try)	
1940	Jack Lindwall	St. George	18	(Note: Lindwall scored one additional try during the 1940 finals series)	
1941	Sel Lisle	Eastern Suburbs	13	(Note: Percy Dermond equalling Lisle on 13 tries by scoring three tries during the 1941 finals series)	
1942	Jack Lindwall (2)	St. George	14	(Note: Lindwall scored two additional tries during the 1942 finals series)	
1943	Cyril McMahon	North Sydney	10	(Note: McMahon scored two additional tries during the 1943 finals series)	
1944	Sid Goodwin (2)	Newtown	20	(Note: Goodwin scored two additional tries during the 1944 finals series)	
1945	Charles Cahill	Newtown	12	(Note: Cahill scored one additional try during the 1945 finals series)	
1945	Athol Stewart (2)	Newtown	12	(Note: Cahill scored one additional try during the 1945 finals series)	
1946	Jack Lindwall (3)	St George Dragons	14	(Note: Lindwall scored two additional tries during the 1946 finals series)	
1947	Bob Lulham	Balmain Tigers	25	(Note: Lulham scored three additional tries during the 1947 finals series)	
1948	Norm Jacobson	Newtown	27		
1949	Ron Roberts	St George Dragons	21	(Note: Roberts scored four additional tries during the 1949 finals series)	
1950	Jack Troy	Newtown	16		
1951	John Graves	South Sydney Rabbitohs	22	(Note: Graves scored six additional tries during the 1951 finals series)	
1952	Peter O'Brien	North Sydney Bears	18	(Note: O'Brien scored two additional tries during the 1952 finals series)	
1953	Ian Moir	South Sydney Rabbitohs	20	(Note: Moir scored three additional tries during the 1953 finals series)	
1954	Ray Preston	Newtown	33	(Note: Preston scored one additional try during the 1954 finals series)	
1955	Brian Allsop	Eastern Suburbs Roosters	18	(Note: Ian Moir equalling Allsop on 18 tries by scoring two tries during the 1955 finals series)	
1956	Tommy Ryan	St George Dragons	17	(Note: Ryan scored two additional tries during the 1956 finals series)	
1957	Tommy Ryan (2)	St George Dragons	24	(Note: Ryan scored two additional tries during the 1957 finals series)	
1958	Brian Allsop (2)	Eastern Suburbs Roosters	16	(Note: Season leading try scorer Eddie Lumsden scored 18 tries for the season, including three tries during the 1958 finals series.)	
1959	Ken Irvine	North Sydney Bears	19		
1960	Reg Gasnier	St George Dragons	21	(Note: Gasnier scored four additional tries during the 1960 finals series)	
1961	Johnny King	St George Dragons	19	(Note: King scored two additional tries during the 1961 finals series)	
1962	Eddie Lumsden	St George Dragons	21		
1963	Reg Gasnier (2)	St George Dragons	22	(Note: Gasnier scored two additional tries during the 1963 finals series)	
1964	Reg Gasnier (3)	St George Dragons	16	(Note: Gasnier scored two additional tries during the 1964 finals series)	
1964	Nick Yakich	Manly Warringah Sea Eagles	16	(Note: Gasnier scored two additional tries during the 1964 finals series)	
1965	Ken Irvine (2)	North Sydney Bears	13	(Note: Season leading try scorer Johnny King scored 15 tries for the season, including four tries during the 1965 finals series.)	
1966	Ken Irvine (3)	North Sydney Bears	13		
1967	Les Hanigan	Manly Warringah Sea Eagles	16		
1968	Stan Gorton	St George Dragons	20	(Note: Gorton scored two additional tries during the 1975 finals series)	
1969	Ken Irvine (4)	North Sydney Bears	17		
1970	Ken Irvine (5)	North Sydney Bears	16		
1971	Paul Cross	Balmain Tigers	18		
1972	John Bradstock	Newtown	18	(Note: Season leading try scorer Bob Fulton scored 19 tries for the season, including two tries during the 1972 finals series.)	
1973	Johnny Mayes	Manly Warringah Sea Eagles	16	(Note: Season leading try scorer Bob Fulton scored 18 tries for the season, including three tries during the 1973 finals series.)	
1974	Kevin Junee	Manly Warringah Sea Eagles	21	(Note: Junee scored two additional tries during the 1975 finals series, with Bill Mullins equalling Junee on 23 tries by scoring four tries during the 1974 finals series.)	
1975	Johnny Mayes (2)	Eastern Suburbs Roosters	14	(Note: Mayes scored two additional tries during the 1975 finals series)	
1975	Mark Harris	Eastern Suburbs Roosters	14	(Note: Mayes scored two additional tries during the 1975 finals series)	
1976	Bob Fulton	Manly Warringah Sea Eagles	18	(Note: Fulton scored three additional tries during the 1976 finals series)	
1976	Tom Mooney	Manly Warringah Sea Eagles	18	(Note: Fulton scored three additional tries during the 1976 finals series)	
1977	Russel Gartner	Manly Warringah Sea Eagles	17		
1978	Larry Corowa	Balmain Tigers	24		
1979	Tom Mooney (2)	Manly Warringah Sea Eagles	16	(Note: Mitch Brennan equalling Mooney on 16 tries by scoring two tries during the 1979 finals series)	
1980	Wayne Wigham	Balmain Tigers	16	(Note: John Ribot equalling Wigham on 16 tries by scoring two tries during the 1980 finals series)	
1981	Terry Fahey	Eastern Suburbs Roosters	15		
1982	Steve Ella	Parramatta Eels	22	(Note: Ella scored one additional try during the 1982 finals series)	
1983	Phil Blake	Manly Warringah Sea Eagles	26	(Note: Blake scored one additional try during the 1983 finals series)	
1984	Terry Lamb	Canterbury-Bankstown Bulldogs	17	(Note: Steve Morris equalling Lamb on 17 tries by scoring four tries during the 1984 finals series.)	
1985	Steve Linnane	St George Dragons	16	(Note: Linnane scored one additional try during the 1985 finals series)	
1986	Phil Blake (2)	Manly Warringah Sea Eagles	13	(Note: Garry Schofield levelled Blake with 13 tries for the season after scoring four tries during the 1986 finals series.)	
1987	Terry Lamb (2)	Canterbury-Bankstown Bulldogs	16		
1988	John Ferguson	Canberra Raiders	20	(Note: Ferguson scored one additional try during the 1988 finals series)	
1989	Greg Alexander	Penrith Panthers	15	(Note: Season leading try scorer Gary Belcher scored 17 tries for the season, including four tries during the 1989 finals series. Laurie Daley also scored 16 tries for the season, including two during the 1989 finals series.)	
1990	Mal Meninga	Canberra Raiders	15	(Note: Meninga scored two additional tries during the 1990 finals series)	
1990	Ashley Gordon	Newcastle Knights	15	(Note: Meninga scored two additional tries during the 1990 finals series)	
1990	Willie Carne	Brisbane Broncos	15	(Note: Meninga scored two additional tries during the 1990 finals series)	
1991	Alan McIndoe	Illawarra Steelers	19		
1992	Tim Brasher	Balmain Tigers	16		
1992	Mark Bell	Western Suburbs Magpies	16		
1993	Noa Nadruku	Canberra Raiders	19	(Note: Nadruku scored three additional tries during the 1993 finals series)	
1994	Steve Renouf	Brisbane Broncos	22	(Note: Renouf scored an additional try during the 1994 finals series)	
Australian Rugby League
1995	Steve Menzies	Manly Warringah Sea Eagles	21	(Note: Menzies scored an additional try during the 1995 finals series)	
1996	Noa Nadruku (2)	Canberra Raiders	21		
1997	Terry Hill	Manly Warringah Sea Eagles	20	(Note: Hill scored an additional two tries during the 1997 finals series)	
Super League
1997	Matthew Ryan	Canterbury-Bankstown Bulldogs	17		
National Rugby League
1998	Darren Smith	Brisbane Broncos	20	(Note: Smith scored an additional three tries during the 1998 finals series) (Note: Buettner scored an additional try during the 1998 finals series)	
1998	Michael Buettner	North Sydney Bears	20	(Note: Smith scored an additional three tries during the 1998 finals series) (Note: Buettner scored an additional try during the 1998 finals series)	
1998	Steve Menzies (2)	Manly Warringah Sea Eagles	20	(Note: Smith scored an additional three tries during the 1998 finals series) (Note: Buettner scored an additional try during the 1998 finals series)	
1999	Nathan Blacklock	St. George Illawarra Dragons	20	(Note: Blacklock scored an additional four tries during the 1999 finals series)	
2000	Nathan Blacklock (2)	St. George Illawarra Dragons	25		
2001	Nathan Blacklock (3)	St. George Illawarra Dragons	25	(Note: Blacklock scored an additional two tries during the 2001 finals series)	
2002	Nigel Vagana	Canterbury-Bankstown Bulldogs	23		
2003	Rhys Wesser	Penrith Panthers	24	(Note: Wesser scored an additional try during the 2003 finals series)	
2004	Amos Roberts	Penrith Panthers	23		
2005	Billy Slater	Melbourne Storm	19	(Note: Slater scored an additional try during the 2005 finals series) (Note: Season leading try scorer Matt Bowen scored 21 tries for the season, including three tries during the 2005 finals series)	
2005	Shaun Berrigan	Brisbane Broncos	19	(Note: Slater scored an additional try during the 2005 finals series) (Note: Season leading try scorer Matt Bowen scored 21 tries for the season, including three tries during the 2005 finals series)	
2006	Nathan Merritt	South Sydney Rabbitohs	22		
2007	Matt Bowen	North Queensland Cowboys	21	(Note: Bowen scored an additional try during the 2007 finals series)	
2007	Israel Folau	Melbourne Storm	21	(Note: Bowen scored an additional try during the 2007 finals series)	
2008	Brett Stewart	Manly Warringah Sea Eagles	19	(Note: Stewart scored an additional three tries during the 2008 finals series)	
2009	Brett Morris	St. George Illawarra Dragons	22	(Note: Morris scored an additional three tries during the 2009 finals series)	
2010	Akuila Uate	Newcastle Knights	21	(Note: Shaun Kenny-Dowall equalling Uate on 21 tries by scoring an additional try during the 2010 finals series)	
2011	Nathan Merritt (2)	South Sydney Rabbitohs	23		
2011	Ben Barba	Canterbury-Bankstown Bulldogs	23		
2012	Ben Barba (2)	Canterbury-Bankstown Bulldogs	21	(Note: Barba scored an additional try during the 2012 finals series)	
2012	Ashley Graham	North Queensland Cowboys	21	(Note: Barba scored an additional try during the 2012 finals series)	
2013	David Williams	Manly Warringah Sea Eagles	19	(Note: Williams scored an additional try during the 2013 finals series) (Note: Jorge Taufua and Michael Jennings equalled David Williams on 20 tries with tries scored during the 2013 finals series)	
2013	David Simmons	Penrith Panthers	19	(Note: Williams scored an additional try during the 2013 finals series) (Note: Jorge Taufua and Michael Jennings equalled David Williams on 20 tries with tries scored during the 2013 finals series)	
2013	James McManus	Newcastle Knights	19	(Note: Williams scored an additional try during the 2013 finals series) (Note: Jorge Taufua and Michael Jennings equalled David Williams on 20 tries with tries scored during the 2013 finals series)	
2014	Jarryd Hayne	Parramatta Eels	20	(Note: Season leading try scorer Alex Johnston scored 21 tries for the season, including four tries during the 2014 finals series)	
2015	Semi Radradra	Parramatta Eels	24		
2016	Suliasi Vunivalu	Melbourne Storm	22	(Note: Vunivalu scored an additional try during the 2016 finals series, with Jordan Rapana equalling Vunivalu on 23 tries by scoring an additional three tries during the 2016 finals series)	
2017	Suliasi Vunivalu (2)	Melbourne Storm	23	(Note: Josh Addo-Carr levelled Vunivalu on 23 tries by scoring an additional four tries during the 2017 finals series)	
Ken Irvine Medalists
2018	David Fusitu'a	New Zealand Warriors	22	(Note: Fusitu'a scored an additional try during the 2018 finals series)	
2019	Maika Sivo	Parramatta Eels	20	(Note: Sivo scored an additional two tries during the 2019 finals series)	
2020	Alex Johnston	South Sydney Rabbitohs	20	(Note: Johnston scored an additional three tries during the 2020 finals series)	
2021	Alex Johnston (2)	South Sydney Rabbitohs	27	(Note: Johnston scored an additional three tries during the 2021 finals series)	
2022	Alex Johnston (3)	South Sydney Rabbitohs	28	(Note: Johnston scored an additional two tries during the 2022 finals series)	
2023	Jamayne Isaako	Dolphins	24	(Note: Season leading try scorer Dominic Young scored 25 tries for the season, including two tries during the 2023 finals series)	
2024	Alofiana Khan-Pereira	Gold Coast Titans	24		
2025	Mark Nawaqanitawase	Sydney Roosters	23		
2026	Alex Johnston (4)	South Sydney Rabbitohs	30		
2026	Thomas Jenkins	Penrith Panthers	30		

=== Multiple recipients ===
Table of multiple recipients
Player	Wins	Club(s)	Years
Ken Irvine	5	North Sydney Bears	1959, 1965, 1966, 1969, 1970
Alex Johnston	4	South Sydney Rabbitohs	2020, 2021, 2022, 2026
Nathan Blacklock	3	St. George Illawarra Dragons	1999, 2000, 2001
Frank Burge	3	Glebe	1915, 1916, 1918
Reg Gasnier	3	St. George Dragons	1960, 1963, 1964
Harold Horder	3	South Sydney	1913, 1914, 1917
Jack Lindwall	3	St. George Dragons	1940, 1942, 1946
Benny Wearing	3	South Sydney	1925, 1926, 1927
Gordon Wright	3	Eastern Suburbs	1919, 1920, 1921
Brian Allsop	2	Eastern Suburbs	1955, 1958
Ben Barba	2	Canterbury-Bankstown Bulldogs	2011, 2012
Phil Blake	2	Manly Warringah Sea Eagles	1983, 1986
Sid Goodwin	2	Balmain/Newtown	1939, 1944
Terry Lamb	2	Canterbury-Bankstown Bulldogs	1984, 1987
Johnny Mayes	2	Manly Warringah Sea Eagles/Eastern Suburbs	1973, 1975
Steve Menzies	2	Manly Warringah Sea Eagles	1995, 1998
Nathan Merritt	2	South Sydney Rabbitohs	2006, 2011
Tom Mooney	2	Manly Warringah Sea Eagles	1976, 1979
Noa Nadruku	2	Canberra Raiders	1993, 1996
Tommy Ryan	2	St. George Dragons	1956, 1957
Athol Stewart	2	Newtown	1938, 1945
Fred Tottey	2	Eastern Suburbs	1936, 1937
Suliasi Vunivalu	2	Melbourne Storm	2016, 2017

=== Club totals ===
Table key
†	Club no longer participates in the NRL
LTS	Number of leading try scorers (1908–2017)
Medalists	Number of Ken Irvine Medals (2018–present)

Table of club totals
Club	Overall			Years
Club	LTS	Medalists	Total	Years
South Sydney Rabbitohs	13	4	17	1909, 1910, 1913, 1914, 1917, 1925, 1926, 1927, 1938, 1951, 1953, 2006, 2011, 2020, 2021, 2022, 2026
Sydney Roosters (Eastern Suburbs)	15	1	16	1908, 1919, 1920, 1921, 1930, 1931, 1935, 1936, 1937, 1941, 1955, 1958, 1975, (Note: Two players from the Roosters tied as leading try scorer) 1981, 2025
Manly Warringah Sea Eagles	15	0	15	1964, 1967, 1973, 1974, 1976, (Note: Two players from Manly tied as leading try scorer) 1977, 1979, 1983, 1986, 1995, 1997, 1998, 2008, 2013
St. George Dragons^{†}	15	—	15	1934, 1939, 1940, 1942, 1946, 1949, 1956, 1957, 1960, 1961, 1962, 1963, 1964, 1968, 1985
North Sydney Bears^{†}	10	—	10	1922, 1923, 1943, 1952, 1959, 1965, 1966, 1969, 1970, 1998
Newtown Jets^{†}	8	—	8	1938, 1944, 1945, (Note: Two players from Newtown tied as leading try scorer) 1948, 1950, 1954, 1972
Balmain Tigers^{†}	7	—	7	1929, 1939, 1947, 1971, 1978, 1980, 1992
Canterbury-Bankstown Bulldogs	6	0	6	1984, 1987, 1997, 2002, 2011, 2012
Glebe^{†}	5	—	5	1911, 1912, 1915, 1916, 1918
Penrith Panthers	4	1	5	1989, 2003, 2004, 2013, 2026
Brisbane Broncos	4	0	4	1990, 1994, 1998, 2005
Canberra Raiders	4	0	4	1988, 1990, 1993, 1996
Melbourne Storm	4	0	4	2005, 2007, 2016, 2017
Parramatta Eels	3	1	4	1982, 2014, 2015, 2019
St. George Illawarra Dragons	4	0	4	1999, 2000, 2001, 2009
Western Suburbs Magpies^{†}	4	—	4	1928, 1929, 1932, 1992
Newcastle Knights	3	0	3	1990, 2010, 2013
North Queensland Cowboys	2	0	2	2007, 2012
Dolphins	—	1	1	2023
Gold Coast Titans	0	1	1	2024
Illawarra Steelers^{†}	1	—	1	1991
New Zealand Warriors	0	1	1	2018
Newcastle^{†}	1	—	1	1909
University^{†}	1	—	1	1933

== See also ==
- Dally M Medal
- Dally M Awards
