= Brian Allsop =

Australian rugby league footballer

Personal information
- Full name: Brian John Allsop
- Born: 9 September 1935 Sydney, New South Wales, Australia
- Died: 17 January 1989 (aged 53) Dee Why, New South Wales, Australia

Playing information
- Position: Wing
Club
Years	Team	Pld	T	G	FG	P
1955–59	Easts	80	59	39	1	257
1960–64	Manly Warringah	74	36	0	0	108
	Total	154	95	39	1	365
Representative
Years	Team	Pld	T	G	FG	P
1955	New South Wales	1	1	0	0	3
- Source: Whiticker/Hudson As of 30 Sep 2020

Brian John Allsop (1935–1989) was an Australian professional rugby league footballer. He played in the 1950s and 1960s for the New South Wales Rugby League.

A wing, Allsop played for two Sydney clubs during his career, with 80 matches for the Eastern Suburbs club in the years 1955–1959, and 74 for Manly-Warringah from 1960–1964.

== Scores in his play ==
An Eastern Suburbs junior, Allsop made it into the first grade side in 1955. In that season he was the NSWRFL, leading try-scorer with 18 tries scored in his 17 matches that year. In one match that year against the Parramatta Eels, he scored 5 tries. Allsop was a representative of Sydney and NSW. The speedy winger scored a total of 59 tries for Easts before departing for Manly, where he scored a further 36 in his time there. He retired at the end of the 1964 season.
