= Jaylan De Groot =

Australian rugby league player

Personal information
- Born: 9 January 2003 (age 23) Tweed Heads, New South Wales, Australia
- Height: 189 cm (6 ft 2 in)

Playing information
- Position: Wing, Fullback, Centre
Club
Years	Team	Pld	T	G	FG	P
2024–	Gold Coast Titans	27	8	0	0	32
- Source: As of 29 August 2026

Jaylan De Groot (born 9 January 2003) is an Australian rugby league footballer who plays as a fullback and winger for the Gold Coast Titans in the National Rugby League.

== Background ==
De Groot played his junior rugby league for the Cudgen Hornets and attended Palm Beach Currumbin State High School before being signed by the Parramatta Eels.

== Playing career ==
=== Early career ===
In 2021, De Groot played for the Tweed Seagulls in the Mal Meninga Cup, scoring a try in their Grand Final win over the Townsville Blackhawks. In December 2021, he signed with the Gold Coast Titans on a three-year contract.

In 2023, De Groot moved up from Tweed's Hastings Deering Colts side into their Queensland Cup side, playing five games.

=== 2024 ===
De Groot began the 2024 season playing for the Ipswich Jets in the Queensland Cup. In Round 26 of the 2024 NRL season, De Groot made his NRL debut, starting at fullback and scoring a try in the Titans' 36–14 loss to the Newcastle Knights.

=== 2025 ===
On 3 June, De Groot re-signed with the Gold Coast outfit until the end of the 2027 season. De Groot played a total of 17 games for the Gold Coast as they narrowly avoided the wooden spoon finishing 16th on the table.

=== 2026 ===
De Groot played ten matches for the Gold Coast in the 2026 NRL season as the club finished 16th on the table.
