= 2008 NRL season =

101st season of National Rugby League

2008 National Rugby League
- Teams: 16
- Premiers: Manly Warringah Sea Eagles (7th title)
- Minor premiers: None
- Matches played: 201
- Points scored: 8470
- Average attendance: 16,317
- Total attendance: 3,279,663
- Top points scorer: Luke Covell (206)
- Wooden spoon: Bulldogs (5th spoon)
- Dally M Medal: Matt Orford
- Top try-scorer: Brett Stewart (22)

The 2008 NRL season was the 101st season of professional rugby league club competition in Australia, and the eleventh run by the National Rugby League. For the second year, sixteen teams competed for the 2008 Telstra Premiership title. The season commenced with the first matches played on 14 March and ended with the grand final, played on 5 October. The premiership was won by the Manly Warringah Sea Eagles, who set the record for the biggest grand final winning margin (40–0) in Australia's rugby league history.

2008 also marked the launch of the National Youth Competition, an under 20 competition running parallel to the senior competition under the sponsorship name, the Toyota Cup.

== Centenary of rugby league ==
Rugby league was first introduced into Australia in 1907, with a meeting in Sydney on 8 August 1908 effectively forming a new breakaway league from the New South Wales Rugby Union. The new body was known as the New South Wales Rugby Football League, and became the first professional sporting code in Australia. In the following months, eight Sydney-based teams were formed and signed up to play in the New South Wales Rugby Football League's premiership, with another club joining a week into competition.

The New South Wales Rugby League continued to run the competition up until and including 1994 when it passed on responsibility to the Australian Rugby League, the national authority for rugby league in Australia. In 1997 a rival Super League competition run by News Limited was started and signed up several existing teams from the Australian Rugby League. After both bodies lost a lot of money that year, a truce was signed and a new competition was formed for the 1998 season, under the brand name "National Rugby League."

Regarded as the spiritual home of rugby league in Australia, Birchgrove Oval hosted the official launch of the NRL's 2008 Centenary rugby league season. During the season, the NRL staged a number of celebrations marking the 100th anniversary of the sport in Australia. The opening match of the 2008 season was held between the remaining two "foundation clubs" from 1908, the Sydney Roosters and the South Sydney Rabbitohs. A 'Heritage round' was introduced to coincide with the 100th anniversary of the first round of competition in the New South Wales Rugby League, whereby teams faced opponents that entered the competition in similar time frames.

Several events took place to celebrate the 100th anniversary of landmark moments in rugby league in Australia. These events began in August 2007 with a re-enactment of the meeting which led to the formation of the New South Wales Rugby League, essentially the beginning of rugby league in Australia. In January and February 2008, several of the foundation clubs, the Newtown Jets, South Sydney Rabbitohs, Balmain Tigers, Sydney Roosters, North Sydney Bears and Western Suburbs Magpies, hosted special functions at the places they were officially formed.

== Season summary ==
=== Schedule ===
The 2008 season was one week longer than the 2007 competition, allowing an extra bye on top of the existing one allocated to each club. In addition, the scheduling of the earlier representative fixtures was changed, including the removal of Monday Night Football on weekends prior to the City vs Country match and the ANZAC Test. The City vs Country fixture was pushed back to Friday night where it had been prior to 2007. Many of these initiatives were announced midway through the 2007 season by the chief executive officer of the National Rugby League, David Gallop, in an attempt to help reduce player fatigue after several complaints of player injuries caused by the short turnaround between some matches.

2008 also saw a change in how the draw is devised, with teams nominating their preferred home opponents in order of preference. The NRL consulted these requests when structuring the season's fixtures. This change is intended to maximise attendances by allowing local derbies and other high-interest matches to be played twice a year. It is a departure from previous methods, which focused on trying to produce an equally difficult playing schedule for each club. The draw was released on 19 October 2007.

On the back of increasing public pressure, the National Rugby League decided to move the Grand Final back from the later timeslot of 7:00pm to 5:00pm. The Grand Final had traditionally been held on a Sunday afternoon up until 2000, after which it was relocated to the evening in order to accommodate the Nine Network's programming desires. Whilst the late night scheduling was not considered as much an issue for New South Wales audiences because of the Labour Day public holiday the following day, it was argued by many Queenslanders that such a time was unsuitable for families on the eve of a weekday. Many individuals in the general public and the media pushed for a full return to a 3:00pm kickoff time where it had been for many decades, whilst Channel 9 continued to insist on 7:00pm. As a compromise, the National Rugby League decided on a "twilight" match starting at 5:00pm. It was the first time since the 2000 season that the grand final was played in daylight, largely due to a change in commencement of Daylight Saving Time in New South Wales, ACT and Victoria in 2008.

=== Teams ===
The number of teams in the NRL remained unchanged since the previous season, with sixteen participating in the regular season: ten from New South Wales, three from Queensland and one from each of Victoria, the Australian Capital Territory and New Zealand. Of the ten from New South Wales, eight (St. George Illawarra are both from Sydney and Wollongong) are from Sydney's metropolitan area, with (St. George Illawarra being a Sydney and Wollongong joint venture. Just two foundation clubs from New South Wales Rugby League season 1908 played in this competition: the Sydney Roosters (formerly known as Eastern Suburbs) and the South Sydney Rabbitohs. The Melbourne Storm were the defending premiers.

For the first time since the 1988 introduction of teams outside of New South Wales, an under-20 competition ran incorporating sides fielded by each of the sixteen premiership clubs. The National Youth Competition, known as the Toyota Cup for sponsorship purposes was solely for under-20 players.

Brisbane Broncos; 21st season Ground: Suncorp Stadium; Coach: Wayne Bennett; Captain: Darren Lockyer	Bulldogs; 74th season Ground: ANZ Stadium; Coach: Steve Folkes; Captain: Andrew Ryan	Canberra Raiders; 27th season Ground: Canberra Stadium; Coach: Neil Henry; Captain: Alan Tongue	Cronulla Sharks; 42nd season Ground: Toyota Stadium; Coach: Ricky Stuart; Captain: Paul Gallen
Gold Coast Titans; 2nd season Ground: Skilled Park; Coach: John Cartwright; Captain: Scott Prince & Luke Bailey	Manly Warringah Sea Eagles; 59th season Ground: Brookvale Oval; Coach: Des Hasler; Captain: Matt Orford	Melbourne Storm; 11th season Ground Olympic Park Stadium; Coach: Craig Bellamy; Captain: Cameron Smith	Newcastle Knights; 21st season Ground: EnergyAustralia Stadium; Coach: Brian Smith; Captain: Danny Buderus
New Zealand Warriors; 14th season Ground: Mt. Smart Stadium; Coach: Ivan Cleary; Captain: Steve Price	North Queensland Cowboys; 14th season Ground: Dairy Farmers Stadium; Coach: Graham Murray→Ian Millward; Captain: Johnathan Thurston	Parramatta Eels; 62nd season Ground: Parramatta Stadium; Coach: Michael Hagan; Captain: Nathan Cayless	Penrith Panthers; 42nd season Ground: CUA Stadium; Coach: Matthew Elliott; Captain: Petero Civoniceva
South Sydney Rabbitohs; 99th season Ground: ANZ Stadium; Coach: Jason Taylor; Captain: David Kidwell & Roy Asotasi	St. George Illawarra Dragons; 10th season Ground: OKI Jubilee Stadium & WIN Stadium; Coach: Nathan Brown; Captain: Mark Gasnier	Sydney Roosters; 101st season Ground: Sydney Football Stadium; Coach: Brad Fittler; Captain: Craig Fitzgibbon→Braith Anasta	Wests Tigers; 9th season Ground: Campbelltown Stadium & Leichhardt Oval; Coach: Tim Sheens; Captain: Brett Hodgson

=== Records set in 2008 ===
- Gold Coast Titans winger Jordan Atkins matched the standing record for most tries in a first grade debut set by Canterbury Bankstown's Tony Nash in season 1942 when he scored four tries in round 1 of 2008.
- The Brisbane Broncos set a new club home attendance record for a regular season game at Suncorp Stadium when 50,612 spectators attended their Round 3 match against the North Queensland Cowboys. However, this did not beat their all-time club record of 58,583 set at their former home ANZ Stadium (Brisbane) (1993-2003) in Round 22 of the 1993 season against the St. George Dragons.
- The Bulldogs set a club home crowd record when 36,526 spectators attended their Round 4 clash against the Sydney Roosters. The match marked Roosters forward Willie Mason's first match against his old club, and also set a record for the highest attended club match in Sydney during a premiership season (excluding finals).
- Ruben Wiki became only the 10th player in history to play 300 first grade games, and is the first New Zealander to pass this milestone.
- The South Sydney Rabbitohs equalled the 2nd biggest comeback in NRL history in Round 16 against the North Queensland Cowboys. After trailing 28–4 after fifty minutes, the Rabbitohs won the match 29–28.
- The North Queensland Cowboys recorded their longest losing streak of 13 matches (round 7–21)
- Melbourne Storm became the first club to win three minor premierships in a row (and also three minor premierships overall) since the founding of the NRL, but these titles have since been stripped by the NRL as a result of gross salary cap infringements.
- The New Zealand Warriors became the first eighth-placed club to win in the first week of the finals since the McIntyre Final 8 System was introduced in season 1999. They progressed to the preliminary final, the furthest stage that any 8th-placed team has progressed. This record stood for 12 months, when the 8th-placed team from the following season, the Parramatta Eels, went one better and made the grand final.
- The Manly Warringah Sea Eagles' grand final defeat of defending premiers Melbourne Storm, 40–0, is the greatest winning margin in a grand final, eclipsing the record set in 1975 which was Eastern Suburbs 38–0 win over St. George Dragons. The last team to be kept scoreless in a grand final was Cronulla in 1978 in the grand final replay against Manly 16–0.
- The season's leading try scorer, Manly-Warringah's Brett Stewart, equalled former Canberra Raiders flyer Brett Mullins' 1994 record for most tries scored in a season by a Fullback with 22 (19 in the regular season, 3 in the finals).

== Marketing ==
=== Sponsorship ===
For the eighth straight season the National Rugby League's maintained its naming rights sponsor Telstra with the competition again known as the Telstra Premiership. In addition to the Telstra Premiership logo appearing over the right upper chest on each team's playing jersey, the Centenary of Rugby league in Australia logo was displayed just above to commemorate the competition's centenary.

Following their successful sponsorship of Friday Night Football in 2007, the Foster's Group decided to change the specific brand sponsorship from their Carlton Draught product to now represent Victoria Bitter. Harvey Norman continued its sponsorship of the State of Origin series while AAMI also continued its association with the annual City vs Country Origin clash. Additionally, Bundaberg Rum maintained naming rights to both the Anzac Test and Monday Night Football.

Throughout the season, various charities and other non-profit organisations received exposure on Sunday Football through Rugby League's One Community Program.

=== Advertising ===
In celebration of the code's 100th anniversary the NRL and its ad agency MJW created for 2008 a Centenary Tribute ad which used historical footage of games and stars of yesteryear, blending in with action sequences of the modern day. Original epic orchestral music was used as the soundtrack. The ad opened with still imagery from 1908 to the modern day juxtaposed and rolling as though an ensemble of players are entering the Sydney Cricket Ground from the dressing rooms in the Members Stand.

The morphed film segments included a 1930s Australia v England Test with modern Australian players in the backline; Wayne Pearce in the 1980s on the sideline at the Sydney Cricket Ground next to a mud covered 1960s player and a sequence where Darren Lockyer circa 2000 takes a pass from Clive Churchill circa 1950. Clever touches include Dragons Mark Gasnier backing up his uncle Reg Gasnier some 40 years apart; Sharks stars of different generations, Steve Rogers and Andrew Ettingshausen running together and Souths' Craig Wing in 2008 putting Ron Coote through a gap in 1968. The final shot shows the 2008 version of Norm Provan and Arthur Summons covered head to toe in mud & recreating the "Gladiators" image from the 1963 grand final acknowledged by the 2007 grand finalists Cameron Smith and Greg Inglis in front of iconic images of grand finals gone by including John Sattler being chaired from the field in 1971 while Brad Fittler celebrates his 2002 win and Bradley Clyde his 1994 premiership.

== Regular season ==
Team	1	2	3	4	5	6	7	8	9	10	11	12	13	14	15	16	17	18	19	20	21	22	23	24	25	26	F1	F2	F3	GF
Brisbane Broncos	**PEN** **+36**	SYD +6	**NQL** **+34**	MEL −20	NEW +12	GCT −2	**SOU** **+14**	WTI +12	**MAN** **−18**	CRO −7	X	**PAR** **+4**	SGI −18	CAN −18	**WTI** **+1**	PEN; 0*	X	**CBY** **−8**	NQL +14	**CRO** **+6**	**CAN** **+28**	NZL −4	**SGI** **−4**	**GCT** **+4***	CBY +14	**NEW** **+22**	SYD +8	**MEL** **−2**		
Canberra Raiders	NEW −16	PEN +4	**SGI** **+7**	GCT −20	**WTI** **+6**	**MEL** **−7**	X	NZL −8	SYD −26	**SOU** **+28**	X	**MAN** **−13**	PAR −18	**BRI** **+18**	CBY +40	**CRO** **−12**	MEL −16	SGI +7	**SYD** **+22**	**GCT** **+42**	BRI −28	**PEN** **+62**	**NEW** **+20**	SOU +15	NQL −12	**CBY** **+18**	CRO −26			
Canterbury-Bankstown Bulldogs	**PAR** **−8**	**SOU** **+13**	**WTI** **+20**	**SYD** **−28**	NZL −20	**SGI** **+12**	MAN −8	X	**PEN** **−26**	GCT −4	**CRO** **+8**	MEL −46	**NEW** **−10**	X	**CAN** **−40**	SYD −10	**SOU** **−4***	BRI +8	**NZL** **−18**	**SGI** **−30**	**WTI** **−52**	NQL −24	PEN −36	**PAR** **−14**	**BRI** **−14**	CAN −18				
Cronulla-Sutherland Sharks	MAN +6	MEL +1	GCT −14	SGI +2*	SOU +2	**PEN** **−1***	**WTI** **−4**	X	NQL +6	**BRI** **+7**	CBY −8	**GCT** **+16**	PEN +2	**NZL** **+16**	**PAR** **+2**	CAN +12	X	**MAN** **−28**	**NEW** **+3**	BRI −6	**SGI** **+1**	**SOU** **+14**	NZL −14	**SYD** **+20**	WTI +26	**NQL** **+6**	**CAN** **+26**	X	**MEL** **−28**	
Gold Coast Titans	**NQL** **+18**	SGI −18	**CRO** **+14**	**CAN** **+20**	PAR +8	**BRI** **+2**	**NZL** **+12**	NEW −1	X	**CBY** **+4**	WTI −2	CRO −16	**MEL** **+18**	X	SOU −1	**SGI** **−4**	**MAN** **−20**	SYD +4	**PEN** **−14**	CAN −42	MEL −40	**NEW** **−20**	NQL +6	BRI −4*	MAN −18	**WTI** **−16**				
Manly Warringah Sea Eagles	**CRO** **−6**	NEW −1*	**NZL** **+46**	**SOU** **+18**	MEL −22	PAR +4	**CBY** **+8**	X	BRI +18	**NQL** **+32**	**SGI** **−2**	CAN +13	**SYD** **+42**	X	NZL +6	**NEW** **+16**	GCT +20	CRO +28	**PAR** **+18**	SYD −22	**PEN** **+20**	**MEL** **−6**	SOU −8	WTI +32	**GCT** **+18**	PEN +18	**SGI** **+32**	X	**NZL** **+26**	**MEL** **+40**
Melbourne Storm	**NZL** **+14**	**CRO** **−1**	SYD −4	**BRI** **+20**	**MAN** **+22**	CAN +7	NQL +2	X	**NEW** **+14**	SGI −24	SOU +5	**CBY** **+46**	GCT −18	X	**NQL** **+28**	PAR −2	**CAN** **+16**	WTI +12	**SGI** **+26**	NZL −2	**GCT** **+40**	MAN +6	**SYD** **+24**	PEN +34	NEW −1	**SOU** **+38**	**NZL** **−3**	BRI +2	CRO +28	MAN −40
Newcastle Knights	**CAN** **+16**	**MAN** **+1***	PAR −1*	NZL −6	**BRI** **−12**	SYD +14	X	**GCT** **+1**	MEL −14	**WTI** **−12**	X	**NZL** **−2**	CBY +10	NQL +12	**SYD** **−2**	MAN −16	**SGI** **−8**	PEN +12	CRO −3	**SOU** **+27**	**PAR** **+20**	GCT +20	CAN −20	**NQL** **+14**	**MEL** **+1**	BRI −22				
New Zealand Warriors	MEL −14	**PAR** **+14**	MAN −46	**NEW** **+6**	**CBY** **+20**	NQL −28	GCT −12	**CAN** **+8**	X	PEN −24	**SYD** **−26**	NEW +2	**SOU** **−7**	CRO −16	**MAN** **−6**	WTI +2	X	**NQL** **+10**	CBY +18	**MEL** **+2**	SOU −2	**BRI** **+4**	**CRO** **+14**	SGI −28	**PEN** **+22**	PAR +22	MEL +3	**SYD** **+17**	MAN −26	
North Queensland Cowboys	GCT −18	**WTI** **−20**	BRI −34	**PAR** **+24**	SGI +4	**NZL** **+28**	**MEL** **−2**	SOU −4	**CRO** **−6**	MAN −32	X	**PEN** **−1***	WTI −24	**NEW** **−12**	MEL −28	**SOU** **−1**	X	NZL −10	**BRI** **−14**	PAR −12	**SYD** **−12**	**CBY** **+24**	**GCT** **−6**	NEW −14	**CAN** **+12**	CRO −6				
Parramatta Eels	CBY +8	NZL −14	**NEW** **+1***	NQL −24	**GCT** **−8**	**MAN** **−4**	X	PEN +8	**SGI** **+1**	**SYD** **−20**	X	BRI −4	**CAN** **+18**	WTI +38	CRO −2	**MEL** **+2**	**PEN** **−6**	SOU −12	MAN −18	**NQL** **+12**	NEW −20	SYD +4	**WTI** **+28**	CBY +14	SGI −26	**NZL** **−22**				
Penrith Panthers	BRI −36	**CAN** **−4**	**SOU** **+4**	WTI +22	**SYD** **−16**	CRO +1*	X	**PAR** **−8**	CBY +26	**NZL** **+24**	X	NQL +1*	**CRO** **−2**	SYD −20	SGI −1	**BRI**; **0***	PAR +6	**NEW** **−12**	GCT +14	**WTI** **+14**	MAN −20	CAN −62	**CBY** **+36**	**MEL** **−34**	NZL −22	**MAN** **−18**				
South Sydney Rabbitohs	**SYD** **−14**	CBY −13	PEN −4	MAN −18	**CRO** **−2**	**WTI** **−20**	BRI −14	**NQL** **+4**	X	CAN −28	**MEL** **−5**	**SGI** **−14**	NZL +7	X	**GCT** **+1**	NQL +1	CBY +4*	**PAR** **+12**	**WTI** **−24**	NEW −27	**NZL** **+2**	CRO −14	**MAN** **+8**	**CAN** **−15**	SYD −2	MEL −38				
St. George Illawarra Dragons	WTI −8	**GCT** **+18**	CAN −7	**CRO** **−2***	**NQL** **−4**	CBY −12	**SYD** **+20**	X	PAR −1	**MEL** **+24**	MAN +2	SOU +14	**BRI** **+18**	X	**PEN** **+1**	GCT +4	NEW +8	**CAN** **−7**	MEL −26	CBY +30	CRO −1	**WTI** **−8**	BRI +4	**NZL** **+28**	**PAR** **+26**	SYD −10	MAN −32			
Sydney Roosters	SOU +14	**BRI** **−6**	**MEL** **+4**	CBY +28	PEN +16	**NEW** **−14**	SGI −20	X	**CAN** **+26**	PAR +20	NZL +26	**WTI** **+9**	MAN −42	**PEN** **+20**	NEW +2	**CBY** **+10**	X	**GCT** **−4**	CAN −22	**MAN** **+22**	NQL +12	**PAR** **−4**	MEL −24	CRO −20	**SOU** **+2**	**SGI** **+10**	**BRI** **−8**	NZL −17		
Wests Tigers	**SGI** **+8**	NQL +20	CBY −20	**PEN** **−22**	CAN −6	SOU +20	CRO +4	**BRI** **−12**	X	NEW +12	**GCT** **+2**	SYD −9	**NQL** **+24**	**PAR** **−38**	BRI −1	**NZL** **−2**	X	**MEL** **−12**	SOU +24	PEN −14	CBY +52	SGI +8	PAR −28	**MAN** **−32**	**CRO** **−26**	GCT +16				
Team	1	2	3	4	5	6	7	8	9	10	11	12	13	14	15	16	17	18	19	20	21	22	23	24	25	26	F1	F2	F3	GF

Bold – Home game
X – Bye
* – Golden point game
Opponent for round listed above margin

== Ladder ==
2008 NRL season
Pos	Team	Pld	W	D	L	B	PF	PA	PD	Pts
1	Melbourne Storm	24	17	0	7	2	584	282	+302	38
2	Manly Warringah Sea Eagles (P)	24	17	0	7	2	645	355	+290	38
3	Cronulla-Sutherland Sharks	24	17	0	7	2	451	384	+67	38
4	Sydney Roosters	24	15	0	9	2	511	446	+65	34
5	Brisbane Broncos	24	14	1	9	2	560	452	+108	33
6	Canberra Raiders	24	13	0	11	2	640	527	+113	30
7	St George Illawarra Dragons	24	13	0	11	2	489	378	+111	30
8	New Zealand Warriors	24	13	0	11	2	502	567	-65	30
9	Newcastle Knights	24	12	0	12	2	516	486	+30	28
10	Wests Tigers	24	11	0	13	2	528	560	-32	26
11	Parramatta Eels	24	11	0	13	2	501	547	-46	26
12	Penrith Panthers	24	10	1	13	2	504	611	-107	25
13	Gold Coast Titans	24	10	0	14	2	476	586	-110	24
14	South Sydney Rabbitohs	24	8	0	16	2	453	666	-213	20
15	North Queensland Cowboys	24	5	0	19	2	474	638	-164	14
16	Canterbury-Bankstown Bulldogs	24	5	0	19	2	433	782	-349	14

For the first time since the 1999 season, the team finishing in 8th spot won more games than it had lost. It should be also noted that on that occasion, 17 teams were in the competition. In addition, no minor premiership was awarded for the third consecutive season. The Melbourne Storm were initially declared minor premiers, but were stripped of the honour after being found guilty of salary cap breaches.

=== Ladder progression ===
- Numbers highlighted in green indicate that the team finished the round inside the top 8.
- Numbers highlighted in blue indicates the team finished first on the ladder in that round.
- Numbers highlighted in red indicates the team finished in last place on the ladder in that round
- Underlined numbers indicate that the team had a bye during that round.

	Team	1	2	3	4	5	6	7	8	9	10	11	12	13	14	15	16	17	18	19	20	21	22	23	24	25	26
1	Melbourne	2	2	2	4	6	8	10	12	14	14	16	18	18	20	22	22	24	26	28	28	30	32	34	36	36	38
2	Manly-Warringah	0	0	2	4	4	6	8	10	12	14	14	16	18	20	22	24	26	28	30	30	32	32	32	34	36	38
3	Cronulla-Sutherland	2	4	4	6	8	8	8	10	12	14	14	16	18	20	22	24	26	26	28	28	30	32	32	34	36	38
4	Sydney	2	2	4	6	8	8	8	10	12	14	16	18	18	20	22	24	26	26	26	28	30	30	30	30	32	34
5	Brisbane	2	4	6	6	8	8	10	12	12	12	14	16	16	16	18	19	21	21	23	25	27	27	27	29	31	33
6	Canberra	0	2	4	4	6	6	8	8	8	10	12	12	12	14	16	16	16	18	20	22	22	24	26	28	28	30
7	St. George Illawarra	0	2	2	2	2	2	4	6	6	8	10	12	14	16	18	20	22	22	22	24	24	24	26	28	30	30
8	New Zealand	0	2	2	4	6	6	6	8	10	10	10	12	12	12	12	14	16	18	20	22	22	24	26	26	28	30
9	Newcastle	2	4	4	4	4	6	8	10	10	10	12	12	14	16	16	16	16	18	18	20	22	24	24	26	28	28
10	Wests	2	4	4	4	4	6	8	8	10	12	14	14	16	16	16	16	18	18	20	20	22	24	24	24	24	26
11	Parramatta	2	2	4	4	4	4	6	8	10	10	12	12	14	16	16	18	18	18	18	20	20	22	24	26	26	26
12	Penrith	0	0	2	4	4	6	8	8	10	12	14	16	16	16	16	17	19	19	21	23	23	23	25	25	25	25
13	Gold Coast	2	2	4	6	8	10	12	12	14	16	16	16	18	20	20	20	20	22	22	22	22	22	24	24	24	24
14	South Sydney	0	0	0	0	0	0	0	2	4	4	4	4	6	8	10	12	14	16	16	16	18	18	20	20	20	20
15	North Queensland	0	0	0	2	4	6	6	6	6	6	8	8	8	8	8	8	10	10	10	10	10	12	12	12	14	14
16	Bulldogs	0	2	4	4	4	6	6	8	8	8	10	10	10	12	12	12	12	14	14	14	14	14	14	14	14	14

== Finals series ==
The National Rugby League employs the McIntyre final eight system and, for the second year running, preliminary finals were allowed to be played outside of Sydney.

- The Manly Warringah Sea Eagles recorded the biggest winning grand final margin in Australia's rugby league history after defeating the Melbourne Storm 40–0, eclipsing the 38–0 score line set by Eastern Suburbs over St. George Dragons in 1975.
- The New Zealand Warriors became the first 8th-placed team to beat the 1st placed minor premiers since the McIntyre final eight system came into the competition in 1999 by beating the Melbourne Storm 18–15, scoring a match winning try with only three minutes remaining.
- The Brisbane Broncos won their first qualifying final match since 2002.

Home	Score	Away	Match information
Home	Score	Away	Date and time	Venue	Referee	Crowd
Qualifying finals
Sydney Roosters	16 – 24	Brisbane Broncos	12 September 2008, 8:00pm	Sydney Football Stadium	Tony Archer	18,343
Cronulla-Sutherland Sharks	36 – 10	Canberra Raiders	13 September 2008, 6:30pm	Toyota Stadium	Jared Maxwell	18,252
Manly Warringah Sea Eagles	38 – 6	St. George Illawarra Dragons	13 September 2008, 8:30pm	Brookvale Oval	Shayne Hayne	19,227
Melbourne Storm	15 – 18	New Zealand Warriors	14 September 2008, 4:00pm	Olympic Park	Jason Robinson	15,193
Semifinals
New Zealand Warriors	30 – 13	Sydney Roosters	19 September 2008, 8:30pm	Mt. Smart Stadium	Tony Archer	25,595
Brisbane Broncos	14 – 16	Melbourne Storm	20 September 2008, 7:45pm	Suncorp Stadium	Shayne Hayne	50,466
Preliminary finals
Cronulla-Sutherland Sharks	0 – 28	Melbourne Storm	26 September 2008, 7:45pm	Sydney Football Stadium	Tony Archer	27,570
Manly Warringah Sea Eagles	32 – 6	New Zealand Warriors	27 September 2008, 7:45pm	Sydney Football Stadium	Shayne Hayne	32,095

=== Finals chart ===
Qualifying finals
1	Melbourne	15
8	New Zealand	18
2	Manly	38
7	St. George Illawarra	6
3	Cronulla	36
6	Canberra	10
4	Sydney	16
5	Brisbane	24

Semifinals
4W	New Zealand	30
2L	Sydney	13
3W	Brisbane	14
1L	Melbourne	16

Preliminary finals
1W	Manly	32
New Zealand	6
2W	Cronulla	0
Melbourne	28

Final
Manly	40
Melbourne	0

== Grand final ==
Sunday, 5 October
5:00pm (AEDT)

Manly-Warringah Sea Eagles	40 – 0	Melbourne Storm
Tries: Michael Robertson (34', 47', 51') 3 Matt Ballin (24') 1 Brent Kite (58') 1 David Williams (67') 1 Steve Menzies (72') 1 Steven Bell (76') 1 Goals: Steve Matai 2/4 (48', 59'); Jamie Lyon 2/2 (74', 78'); Matt Orford 0/2	1st: 8 - 0; 2nd: 32 - 0 Report

ANZ Stadium
Attendance: 80,388
Clive Churchill Medal: Brent Kite
Referee: Tony Archer

== Player records ==
In 2008 New Zealand's Ruben Wiki was the oldest player in the NRL at 35 years and 250 days. Sam Perrett ran 3,720 metres with the ball in 2008, more than any other player in the competition.

=== Top 5 point scorers ===
Pts	Player	T	Gls	FG
196	Luke Covell	14	70	0
169	Luke Burt	11	62	1
160	Cameron Smith	4	72	0
153	Matt Orford	2	72	1
150	Kurt Gidley	9	57	0

=== Top 5 try scorers ===
Try	Player
19	Brett Stewart
17	Denan Kemp
16	Manu Vatuvei
16	Greg Inglis
15	Shaun Kenny-Dowall
15	Adrian Purtell

== 2008 transfers ==
=== Players ===
Player	2007 club	2008 club
Shaun Berrigan	Brisbane Broncos	Super League: Hull F.C.
Dane Carlaw	Brisbane Broncos	Super League: Catalans Dragons
Petero Civoniceva	Brisbane Broncos	Penrith Panthers
Craig Frawley	Brisbane Broncos	Retirement
Andrew Lomu	Brisbane Broncos	Retirement
Brent Tate	Brisbane Broncos	New Zealand Warriors
Brad Thorn	Brisbane Broncos	Crusaders (Super 14)
Matt Bickerstaff	Canberra Raiders	Retirement
Michael Dobson	Canberra Raiders	Super League: Hull Kingston Rovers
Andrew Dunemann	Canberra Raiders	Retirement
David Howell	Canberra Raiders	Super League: Harlequins RL
Willie Mason	Canterbury-Bankstown Bulldogs	Sydney Roosters
Mark O'Meley	Canterbury-Bankstown Bulldogs	Sydney Roosters
Adam Perry	Canterbury-Bankstown Bulldogs	Retirement
Cameron Phelps	Canterbury-Bankstown Bulldogs	Super League: Wigan Warriors
Brent Sherwin	Canterbury-Bankstown Bulldogs	Super League: Castleford Tigers
Adam Dykes	Cronulla-Sutherland Sharks	Super League: Hull F.C.
Josh Hannay	Cronulla-Sutherland Sharks	Celtic Crusaders (National League One)
Phillip Leuluai	Cronulla-Sutherland Sharks	Salford City Reds (National League One)
Henry Perenara	Cronulla-Sutherland Sharks	Retirement
Craig Stapleton	Cronulla-Sutherland Sharks	Salford City Reds (National League One)
Matt Hilder	Gold Coast Titans	Newcastle Knights
Richard Mathers	Gold Coast Titans	Super League: Wigan Warriors
Jake Webster	Gold Coast Titans	Super League: Hull Kingston Rovers
Travis Burns	Manly Warringah Sea Eagles	North Queensland Cowboys
Shayne Dunley	Manly Warringah Sea Eagles	Retirement
Chris Hicks	Manly Warringah Sea Eagles	Super League: Warrington Wolves
Michael Monaghan	Manly Warringah Sea Eagles	Super League: Warrington Wolves
Ben Cross	Melbourne Storm	Newcastle Knights
Garret Crossman	Melbourne Storm	Super League: Hull Kingston Rovers
Matt King	Melbourne Storm	Super League: Warrington Wolves
Clint Newton	Melbourne Storm	Super League: Hull Kingston Rovers
Matt Rua	Melbourne Storm	Retirement
Daniel Abraham	Newcastle Knights	North Queensland Cowboys
Riley Brown	Newcastle Knights	Sydney Roosters
George Carmont	Newcastle Knights	Super League: Wigan Warriors
Luke Davico	Newcastle Knights	Retirement
Andrew Johns	Newcastle Knights	Retirement
Josh Perry	Newcastle Knights	Manly Warringah Sea Eagles
Kirk Reynoldson	Newcastle Knights	St. George Illawarra Dragons
Mitchell Sargent	Newcastle Knights	Super League: Castleford Tigers
Brad Tighe	Newcastle Knights	Penrith Panthers
Adam Woolnough	Newcastle Knights	Penrith Panthers
Louis Anderson	New Zealand Warriors	Super League: Warrington Wolves
Todd Byrne	New Zealand Warriors	Super League: Hull F.C.
George Gatis	New Zealand Warriors	Super League: Huddersfield Giants
Tony Martin	New Zealand Warriors	Super League: Wakefield Trinity Wildcats
Brenton Bowen	North Queensland Cowboys	Gold Coast Titans
Paul Bowman	North Queensland Cowboys	Retirement
David Faiumu	North Queensland Cowboys	Super League: Huddersfield Giants
Rod Jensen	North Queensland Cowboys	Super League: Huddersfield Giants
Shane Muspratt	North Queensland Cowboys	Mackay Cutters (Queensland Cup)
Jason Smith	North Queensland Cowboys	Retirement
Neil Sweeney	North Queensland Cowboys	Retirement
Aaron Cannings	Parramatta Eels	Gold Coast Titans
Richie Faʻaoso	Parramatta Eels	Newcastle Knights
Ian Hindmarsh	Parramatta Eels	Retirement
PJ Marsh	Parramatta Eels	Brisbane Broncos
Tim Smith	Parramatta Eels	Super League: Wigan Warriors
Timana Tahu	Parramatta Eels	New South Wales Waratahs (Super 14)
Joel Clinton	Penrith Panthers	Brisbane Broncos
Matthew Cross	Penrith Panthers	Gold Coast Titans
Craig Gower	Penrith Panthers	Aviron Bayonnais (French rugby union)
Bryan Norrie	Penrith Panthers	Cronulla-Sutherland Sharks
Peter Wallace	Penrith Panthers	Brisbane Broncos
Nick Youngquest	Penrith Panthers	Canterbury-Bankstown Bulldogs
Peter Cusack	South Sydney Rabbitohs	Super League: Hull F.C.
Joe Galuvao	South Sydney Rabbitohs	Parramatta Eels
Paul Mellor	South Sydney Rabbitohs	Retirement
David Peachey	South Sydney Rabbitohs	Retirement
Shane Rigon	South Sydney Rabbitohs	Retirement
Stuart Webb	South Sydney Rabbitohs	St. George Illawarra Dragons
Sam Isemonger	St. George Illawarra Dragons	Retirement
Wes Naiqama	St. George Illawarra Dragons	Newcastle Knights
Corey Payne	St. George Illawarra Dragons	Wests Tigers
Adam Peek	St. George Illawarra Dragons	Cronulla-Sutherland Sharks
Ashton Sims	St. George Illawarra Dragons	Brisbane Broncos
Danny Wicks	St. George Illawarra Dragons	Newcastle Knights
Chris Beattie	Sydney Roosters	Lézignan Sangliers
Ashley Harrison	Sydney Roosters	Gold Coast Titans
Heath L'Estrange	Sydney Roosters	Manly Warringah Sea Eagles
Joel Monaghan	Sydney Roosters	Canberra Raiders
Danny Nutley	Sydney Roosters	Cronulla-Sutherland Sharks
Craig Wing	Sydney Roosters	South Sydney Rabbitohs
Daniel Fitzhenry	Wests Tigers	Super League: Hull Kingston Rovers
Ben Galea	Wests Tigers	Super League: Hull Kingston Rovers
Jason Moodie	Wests Tigers	Retirement
Paul Whatuira	Wests Tigers	Super League: Huddersfield Giants
Ben Harris	Super League: Bradford Bulls	North Queensland Cowboys
Ian Henderson	Super League: Bradford Bulls	New Zealand Warriors
Mathew Head	Super League: Hull F.C.	Wests Tigers
Brent Grose	Super League: Warrington Wolves	Sydney Roosters
Michael Sullivan	Super League: Warrington Wolves	Canterbury-Bankstown Bulldogs
David Vaealiki	Super League: Wigan Warriors	Manly Warringah Sea Eagles
Sean Rudder	Ricoh Black Rams (Japanese rugby union)	Sydney Roosters
Wendell Sailor	N/A	St. George Illawarra Dragons

== Related links ==
- 2008 NRL season results
- 2008 NRL Under-20s season
- 2008 Dally M Awards

=== 2008 representative games ===
- City vs Country Origin
- ANZAC Centenary Test
- State of Origin 2008
- 2008 Rugby League World Cup

=== Team season articles ===
- Brisbane Broncos 2008
- Bulldogs season 2008
- Canberra Raiders season 2008
- Cronulla-Sutherland Sharks 2008
- Manly-Warringah Sea Eagles 2008
- Melbourne Storm 2008
- North Queensland Cowboys season 2008
- Sydney Roosters season 2008
- Wests Tigers 2008
