= 2008 Cronulla-Sutherland Sharks season =

- NRL rank: 3rd
- 2008 record: Wins: 18; draws: 0; losses: 8
- Points scored: For: 487 (82 tries, 78 goals, 3 field goals); against: 422 (74 tries, 62 goals, 2 field goals)

Team information
- Coach: Ricky Stuart
- Captain: Paul Gallen Greg Bird
- Stadium: Toyota Stadium
- Avg. attendance: 12,965

Top scorers
- Tries: Luke Covell (15)
- Goals: Luke Covell (73)
- Points: Luke Covell (206)
← 2007	2009 →

The 2008 Cronulla-Sutherland Sharks season was the 42nd in the club's history. Coached by Ricky Stuart and captained by Paul Gallen and Greg Bird, they competed in the National Rugby League's 2008 Telstra Premiership, finishing the regular season 3rd (out of 16) to qualify for the finals. The Sharks then came within one game of the Grand Final but were knocked out by eventual runners-up Melbourne Storm.

== Season summary ==
The Sharks began the season on a positive note, with a victory over 2007 runners-up Manly Sea Eagles in Round 1 followed by a shock 17-16 victory over 2007 grand final winners Melbourne in Round 2. The match against the Storm was marred by an on-field brawl after an illegal tackle by Cronulla's Ben Ross on Melbourne's Cooper Cronk, resulting in both Ross and Melbourne's Brett White being sent off and later being referred to the NRL Judiciary.

The Sharks' season of promise was however marred by the late season suspension of star player Greg Bird, following its round 24, 20-0 win over top four contenders the Sydney Roosters at home. Bird was accused of glassing his then-girlfriend Katie Milligan and was stood down by the club just a fortnight out from the finals. Furthermore, five-eighth Brett Seymour suffered a knee injury during the finals; robbing the Sharks of any valuable halves experience at the wrong end of the season. Bird was later sacked by the Sharks; since then he has been exonerated over the glassing incident and he now plays for the Gold Coast Titans.

The Sharks ended the season joint minor premiers with Manly and Melbourne (third on points differential) and many believed this was the year Cronulla would finally win its maiden premiership. The Sharks won its first final in style, thrashing the Canberra Raiders 36-10 at home with Misi Taulapapa, a Warriors outcast scoring a hat-trick. Due to the Melbourne Storm losing its first final, the Sharks earned the week off along with Manly. It was during this time that Seymour suffered his knee injury, ending his 2008 season. The Sharks' season ended with a disappointing 28-0 defeat at the hands of the Melbourne Storm whose captain Cameron Smith was suspended a week earlier for a grapple tackle on Brisbane's Sam Thaiday.

== Ladder ==
2008 NRL season
Pos	Team	Pld	W	D	L	B	PF	PA	PD	Pts
1	Melbourne Storm	24	17	0	7	2	584	282	+302	38
2	Manly Warringah Sea Eagles (P)	24	17	0	7	2	645	355	+290	38
3	Cronulla-Sutherland Sharks	24	17	0	7	2	451	384	+67	38
4	Sydney Roosters	24	15	0	9	2	511	446	+65	34
5	Brisbane Broncos	24	14	1	9	2	560	452	+108	33
6	Canberra Raiders	24	13	0	11	2	640	527	+113	30
7	St George Illawarra Dragons	24	13	0	11	2	489	378	+111	30
8	New Zealand Warriors	24	13	0	11	2	502	567	-65	30
9	Newcastle Knights	24	12	0	12	2	516	486	+30	28
10	Wests Tigers	24	11	0	13	2	528	560	-32	26
11	Parramatta Eels	24	11	0	13	2	501	547	-46	26
12	Penrith Panthers	24	10	1	13	2	504	611	-107	25
13	Gold Coast Titans	24	10	0	14	2	476	586	-110	24
14	South Sydney Rabbitohs	24	8	0	16	2	453	666	-213	20
15	North Queensland Cowboys	24	5	0	19	2	474	638	-164	14
16	Canterbury-Bankstown Bulldogs	24	5	0	19	2	433	782	-349	14

== Results ==
15 March 2008 Round 1	Manly-Warringah Sea Eagles	10 – 16	Cronulla-Sutherland Sharks	Brookvale Oval
19:30	Tries: Anthony Watmough; Michael Bani; Goals: Matt Orford 1/2		Tries: Bryson Goodwin; Brett Kearney; Goals: Luke Covell 4/5	Attendance: 15,424; Referee: Jarred Maxwell

23 March 2008 Round 2	Melbourne Storm	16 – 17	Cronulla-Sutherland Sharks	Olympic Park
15:00	Tries: Russell Aitken; Brett White; Israel Folau; Goals: Cameron Smith 2/3		Tries: David Simmons; Brett Kearney; Paul Gallen; Goals: Luke Covell 2/5; Field Goals: Brett Kimmorley (1)	Attendance: 10,720; Referee: Tony Archer

29 March 2008 Round 3	Gold Coast Titans	18 – 4	Cronulla-Sutherland Sharks	Skilled Park
20:30				Attendance: 19,050; Referee: Jason Robinson

5 April 2008 Round 4	St. George Illawarra Dragons	16 – 18	Cronulla-Sutherland Sharks	OKI Jubilee Stadium
17:30	Tries: Josh Morris; Lagi Setu; Ben Hornby; Goals: Mark Gasnier 0/2; Jamie Soward 2/2		Tries: Greg Bird; Brett Kearney; Bryson Goodwin; Goals: Luke Covell 3/4	Attendance: 15,318; Referee: Sean Hampstead

14 April 2008 Round 5	South Sydney Rabbitohs	10 – 12	Cronulla-Sutherland Sharks	ANZ Stadium
19:00	Tries: John Sutton; Beau Champion; Goals: Nathan Merritt 1/2		Tries: Greg Bird; Luke Covell; Goals: Luke Covell 2/3	Attendance: 12,988; Referee: Jason Robinson

19 April 2008 Round 6	Cronulla-Sutherland Sharks	20 – 21	Penrith Panthers	Toyota Stadium
19:30	Tries: Greg Bird (2); Lance Thompson; Fraser Anderson; Goals: Luke Covell 2/4		Tries: Nathan Smith; Michael Jennings; Michael Gordon; Luke Rooney; Goals: Jarrod Sammut 2/4; Field Goals: Jarrod Sammut (1)	Attendance: 13,852; Referee: Sean Hampstead

27 April 2008 Round 7	Cronulla-Sutherland Sharks	16 – 20	Wests Tigers	Toyota Stadium
15:00	Tries: Brett Kearney; Brett Seymour; Goals: Luke Covell 4/5		Tries: Chris Lawrence (2); Chris Heighington; Brett Hodgson; Goals: Brett Hodgson 2/4	Attendance: 17,241; Referee: Shayne Hayne

10 May 2008 Round 9	North Queensland Cowboys	18 – 24	Cronulla-Sutherland Sharks	Dairy Farmers Stadium
19:30	Tries: Mark Henry; Carl Webb; Luke O'Donnell; Goals: Johnathan Thurston 3/3		Tries: Brett Kearney; Fraser Anderson; Luke Douglas; Paul Gallen; Goals: Luke Covell 4/5	Attendance: 17,065; Referee: Tony Archer

17 May 2008 Round 10	Cronulla-Sutherland Sharks	13 – 6	Brisbane Broncos	Toyota Stadium
17:30	Tries: Misi Taulapapa; Brett Kearney; Goals: Luke Covell 2/3; Field Goals: Brett Kimmorley (1)		Tries: Tonie Carroll; Goals: Michael Ennis 1/1	Attendance: 13,431; Referee: Jarred Maxwell

26 May 2008 Round 11	Canterbury-Bankstown Bulldogs	30 – 22	Cronulla-Sutherland Sharks	ANZ Stadium
19:00				Attendance: 9,289; Referee: Tony Archer

1 June 2008 Round 12	Cronulla-Sutherland Sharks	32 – 14	Gold Coast Titans	Toyota Stadium
15:00				Attendance: 8,214; Referee: Ben Cummins

8 June 2008 Round 13	Penrith Panthers	22 – 24	Cronulla-Sutherland Sharks	Penrith Stadium
14:00				Attendance: 10,543; Referee: Jarred Maxwell

14 June 2008 Round 14	Cronulla-Sutherland Sharks	24 – 8	New Zealand Warriors	Toyota Stadium
19:30				Attendance: 9,023; Referee: Ben Cummins

22 June 2008 Round 15	Cronulla-Sutherland Sharks	16 – 14	Parramatta Eels	Toyota Stadium
15:00				Attendance: 17,547; Referee: Shayne Hayne

30 June 2008 Round 16	Canberra Raiders	24 – 36	Cronulla-Sutherland Sharks	Canberra Stadium
19:00				Attendance: 9,136; Referee: Sean Hampstead

12 July 2008 Round 18	Cronulla-Sutherland Sharks	6 – 34	Manly-Warringah Sea Eagles	Toyota Stadium
19:30				Attendance: 18,217; Referee: Jason Robinson

19 July 2008 Round 19	Cronulla-Sutherland Sharks	16 – 13	Newcastle Knights	Toyota Stadium
19:30				Attendance: 10,112; Referee: Tony Archer

25 July 2008 Round 20	Brisbane Broncos	18 – 12	Cronulla-Sutherland Sharks	Suncorp Stadium
19:30				Attendance: 27,905; Referee: Shayne Hayne

2 August 2008 Round 21	Cronulla-Sutherland Sharks	13 – 12	St. George Illawarra Dragons	Toyota Stadium
17:30				Attendance: 18,256; Referee: Jarred Maxwell

9 August 2008 Round 22	Cronulla-Sutherland Sharks	28 – 14	South Sydney Rabbitohs	Toyota Stadium
19:30				Attendance: 12,618; Referee: Ben Cummins

16 August 2008 Round 23	New Zealand Warriors	18 – 4	Cronulla-Sutherland Sharks	Mount Smart Stadium
19:30				Attendance: 10,417; Referee: Tony Archer

22 August 2008 Round 24	Cronulla-Sutherland Sharks	20 – 0	Sydney Roosters	Toyota Stadium
19:30				Attendance: 10,013; Referee: Jason Robinson

29 August 2008 Round 25	Wests Tigers	6 – 32	Cronulla-Sutherland Sharks	Leichhardt Oval
19:30				Attendance: 10,766; Referee: Sean Hampstead

6 September 2008 Round 26	Cronulla-Sutherland Sharks	28 – 22	North Queensland Cowboys	Toyota Stadium
19:30				Attendance: 7,057; Referee: Ben Cummins

13 September 2008 Qualifying Final	Cronulla-Sutherland Sharks	36 – 10	Canberra Raiders	Toyota Stadium
18:30	Tries: Misi Taulapapa (3); Brett Seymour; Luke Covell; Ben Pomeroy; Brett Kearney; Goals: Luke Covell 3/7; Brett Kimmorley 1/1		Tries: Marshall Chalk; Colin Best; Goals: Terry Campese 1/2	Attendance: 18,252; Referee: Jarred Maxwell

26 September 2008 Preliminary Final	Cronulla-Sutherland Sharks	0 – 28	Melbourne Storm	Sydney Football Stadium
19:45			Tries: Steve Turner (2); Israel Folau; Adam Blair; Matt Geyer; Goals: Steve Turner 4/5	Attendance: 27,570; Referee: Tony Archer
