= 2008 Canberra Raiders season =

- National Youth Competition champions
- NRL Rank: 6th
- Play-off result: Lost in qualifying final (Cronulla Sharks, 36–10)
- 2008 record: Wins: 13; draws: 0; losses: 11
- Points scored: For: 650; against: 563

Team information
- CEO: Don Furner
- Coach: Neil Henry
- Captain: Alan Tongue
- Stadium: Canberra Stadium
- Avg. attendance: 11,913
- High attendance: 15,550

Top scorers
- Tries: Adrian Purtell (15)
- Goals: Todd Carney (46)
- Points: Terry Campese (120)
← 2007	List of seasons	2009 →

2008 was the Canberra Raiders' 27th season in the National Rugby League competition. The Raiders began the year favourites to win the wooden spoon. However, they finished 6th (out of 16) and were eliminated in the first week of the finals.

== Season summary ==
The 2008 season started with some promise for the Raiders – a good showing despite a loss in round 1 vs. Newcastle was followed up with two solid wins against Penrith and St. George-Illawarra. The club has since suffered a series of losses, whilst snaring only the occasional victory, with a big come from behind victory against Wests being noteworthy. In the representative field, Todd Carney and Joel Monaghan picked for Country Origin, and Monaghan being a shadow player for the New South Wales Side. However, as in recent seasons, injuries have been the curse of the Canberra club, with no less than three players suffering dreaded ACL ruptures, arguably the worst kind of injury a footballer can receive, essentially ending their season. Worse, the three players afflicted, Will Zillman, Lincoln Withers and Phil Graham are amongst the Raiders best players. Compounding this, talented back-rowers Neville Costigan and Tom Learoyd-Lahrs have spent minimal time on the field due to recurring minor injuries. The club has also suffered badly in the recruiting race, with Zillman and strong front rower Michael Weyman opting to go elsewhere next season, with indications that Costigan and Scott Logan will do the same. Additionally, half Michael Dobson left the club mid-season for the English club Hull KR, due to lack of opportunities in Canberra. Finally, Coach Neil Henry has exercised a get-out clause in his contract, and will coach the North-Queensland Cowboys in 2009, with former player and club legend, but inexperienced coach, David Furner taking over in 2009. To date, beyond a few talented youngsters, the club is yet to procure a single player of note for season 2009, and will once again be forced to rely on youthful talent. At Round 13, Canberra sat well outside the eight, and the season looked as though it could end with a whimper.

However, far from fading away, the Raiders bounced back with a comprehensive victory over the Brisbane Broncos and then proceeded to thrash the Canterbury Bulldogs, inflicting the worst loss on the Sydney-based club in over half a century. Despite successive losses to the Cronulla Sharks and defending premiers Melbourne Storm, Canberra fought hard in both games, then broke a 13-year losing streak in Wollongong (and ended a 7 match winning streak by the home team) with an impressive win over St. George-Illawarra. The season highlight, however, was a comprehensive 34–12 win over league leaders, the Sydney Roosters. With 7 rounds left in the 2008 premiership, Canberra sits just one point outside the top eight. With a comparatively friendly draw, playing several teams below them on the table, the Raiders are poised to sneak into the semi-finals for the first time in two years. After a comprehensive 74–12 win over the Panthers the Raiders moved into an unexpected 6th spot on the ladder from 11th to almost cement a spot in the 2008 finals series with 4 games remaining.

The Raiders went closer to the top eight with two important wins against Newcastle and Souths. They are now on a three-match winning streak with 2 games remaining.

The season has not been without controversy, however, with star halfback Todd Carney and fullback Bronx Goodwin being stood down by the club after an altercation at a Canberra nightclub following the round 19 win against the Roosters. Carney was eventually dismissed by the club after failing to agree to the punishment plan the club had laid out for him, Goodwin's future is still to be determined.

As of 6 September 2008, despite a heavy injury toll, the Raiders are guaranteed a place in the NRL 2008 Finals Series, a feat which was at the start of the season impossible according to Rugby League punditry in Australia.

The Raiders semi-final appearance was brief, however. After being defeated by the Cronulla Sharks, the Raiders 6th-place finish was considered to be enough to get them a second chance. However, a huge upset with 8th-place New Zealand defeating minor premiers Melbourne saw the Raiders eliminated.

== Season results ==
Trial Games
Round	Opponent	Result	Can.	Opp.	Date	Venue	Crowd	Position
Trial Match	Gold Coast Titans	Win	34	28	16 Feb	Ipswich		N/A
Trial Match	Brisbane Broncos	Win	32	16	23 Feb	Wade Park	8,500	N/A
Trial Match	North Queensland Cowboys	Loss	20	32	1 Mar	Mackay		N/A
NRL Regular Season Games
1	Newcastle Knights	Loss	14	30	15 Mar	Energy Australia Stadium	17,233	14/16
2	Penrith Panthers	Win	20	16	22 Mar	CUA Stadium	7,503	12/16
3	St George Illawarra Dragons	Win	21	14	29 Mar	Canberra Stadium	14,400	8/16
4	Gold Coast Titans	Loss	12	32	5 Apr	Skilled Park	17,381	11/16
5 (1989 League; Legends Cup)	Wests Tigers	Win	30	24	13 Apr	Canberra Stadium	12,240	6/16
6 (Heritage Round)	Melbourne Storm	Loss	16	23	21 Apr	Canberra Stadium	15,550	11/16
7	BYE				25–27 Apr			9/16
8	New Zealand Warriors	Loss	6	14	4 May	Mount Smart Stadium	7,358	11/16
9	Sydney Roosters	Loss	4	30	10 May	Sydney Football Stadium	10,241	13/16
10	South Sydney Rabbitohs	Win	38	10	19 May	Canberra Stadium	11,155	10/16
11	BYE				23–26 May			10/16
12	Manly Sea Eagles	Loss	18	31	30 May	Canberra Stadium	13,120	11/16
13	Parramatta Eels	Loss	12	30	7 Jun	Parramatta Stadium	10,195	12/16
14	Brisbane Broncos	Win	34	16	15 Jun	Canberra Stadium	11,157	12/16
15	Canterbury Bulldogs	Win	58	18	21 Jun	ANZ Stadium	9,845	10/16
16	Cronulla Sharks	Loss	24	36	30 Jun	Canberra Stadium	9,136	11/16
17	Melbourne Storm	Loss	14	30	6 Jul	Olympic Park	11,719	12/16
18	St George Illawarra Dragons	Win	19	12	13 Jul	WIN Stadium	14,040	11/16
19	Sydney Roosters	Win	34	12	20 Jul	Canberra Stadium	13,417	9/16
20	Gold Coast Titans	Win	46	4	26 Jul	Canberra Stadium	8,700	8/16
21	Brisbane Broncos	Loss	6	34	3 Aug	Suncorp Stadium	28,103	10/16
22	Penrith Panthers	Win	74	12	10 Aug	Canberra Stadium	6,500	6/16
23	Newcastle Knights	Win	38	18	17 Aug	Canberra Stadium	12,206	6/16
24	South Sydney Rabbitohs	Win	40	25	24 Aug	ANZ Stadium	10,128	6/16
25	North Queensland Cowboys	Loss	10	22	30 Aug	Dairy Farmers Stadium	14,985	7/16
26	Canterbury Bulldogs	Win	52	34	7 Sep	Canberra Stadium	15,411	6/16
NRL Finals Games
QF	Cronulla Sharks	Loss	10	36	13 Sep	Toyota Stadium	18,562	N/A

Colour	Result
Green	Win
Red	Loss
Yellow	Golden point Win
Blue	Bye

=== Toyota Cup (Under 20s) ===
The Raiders' Toyota Cup team won 28–24 over the Broncos' team in golden point extra time to with the Toyota Cup (Under 20s) premiership in the lead-up game to the NRL Grand Final on 5 October 2008

== Club Awards ==
Award	Winner
Mal Meninga Medal	Joel Monaghan
Coaches Award	Dane Tilse
Rookie of the Year	Glen Buttriss
Fred Daly Memorial Clubman of the Year Trophy	Terry Campese
National Youth Competition Player of the Year	Shaun Fensom
National Youth Competition Coaches Award	Joel Thompson
Gordon McLucas Memorial Award (Junior representative player of the year)	Justin Carney
Geoff Caldwell Memorial Award (Vocational Encouragement)	Brendon Wheatley

== Squad ==
- Colin Best
- Terry Campese
- Marshall Chalk
- Neville Costigan
- Phil Graham
- Marc Herbert
- Ryan Hinchcliffe
- Ben Jones
- Brett Kelly
- Tom Learoyd-Lahrs
- Scott Logan
- Josh Miller
- David Milne
- Joel Monaghan
- Joe Picker
- Adrian Purtell
- Nigel Plum
- Troy Thompson
- Trevor Thurling
- Dane Tilse
- Alan Tongue (c)
- Glen Turner
- Michael Weyman
- Lincoln Withers

Players used outside top 25

- Glen Buttriss
- Justin Carney
- Joel Thompson

Released mid-season

- Todd Carney
- Michael Dobson

=== Run-on Team ===
Canberra Raiders Run-on Team
8 Troy Thompson	9 Ryan Hinchcliffe	10 Dane Tilse
11 Marshall Chalk	12 Joe Picker
13 Alan Tongue(c)
7 Marc Herbert
6 Terry Campese
4 Joel Monaghan
3 Adrian Purtell
5 Justin Carney	2 Colin Best
1 David Milne

== Ladders ==
2008 NRL season
Pos	Team	Pld	W	D	L	B	PF	PA	PD	Pts
1	Melbourne Storm	24	17	0	7	2	584	282	+302	38
2	Manly Warringah Sea Eagles (P)	24	17	0	7	2	645	355	+290	38
3	Cronulla-Sutherland Sharks	24	17	0	7	2	451	384	+67	38
4	Sydney Roosters	24	15	0	9	2	511	446	+65	34
5	Brisbane Broncos	24	14	1	9	2	560	452	+108	33
6	Canberra Raiders	24	13	0	11	2	640	527	+113	30
7	St George Illawarra Dragons	24	13	0	11	2	489	378	+111	30
8	New Zealand Warriors	24	13	0	11	2	502	567	-65	30
9	Newcastle Knights	24	12	0	12	2	516	486	+30	28
10	Wests Tigers	24	11	0	13	2	528	560	-32	26
11	Parramatta Eels	24	11	0	13	2	501	547	-46	26
12	Penrith Panthers	24	10	1	13	2	504	611	-107	25
13	Gold Coast Titans	24	10	0	14	2	476	586	-110	24
14	South Sydney Rabbitohs	24	8	0	16	2	453	666	-213	20
15	North Queensland Cowboys	24	5	0	19	2	474	638	-164	14
16	Canterbury-Bankstown Bulldogs	24	5	0	19	2	433	782	-349	14

2008 Toyota Cup season
Pos	Team	Pld	W	D	L	B	PF	PA	PD	Pts
1	Canberra Raiders (P)	24	18	0	6	2	744	581	+163	40
2	Brisbane Broncos	24	15	1	8	2	684	476	+208	35
3	New Zealand Warriors	24	14	3	7	2	721	533	+188	35
4	Penrith Panthers	24	15	1	8	2	692	583	+109	35
5	Parramatta Eels	24	14	3	7	2	578	564	+14	35
6	St George Illawarra Dragons	24	13	2	9	2	561	520	+41	32
7	Canterbury-Bankstown Bulldogs	24	12	3	9	2	711	587	+124	31
8	Gold Coast Titans	24	13	1	10	2	686	567	+119	31
9	Wests Tigers	24	13	0	11	2	620	623	-3	30
10	South Sydney Rabbitohs	24	11	2	11	2	618	584	+34	28
11	Manly Warringah Sea Eagles	24	11	0	13	2	519	532	-13	26
12	Newcastle Knights	24	8	1	15	2	526	630	-104	21
13	Melbourne Storm	24	8	1	15	2	512	638	-126	21
14	Cronulla-Sutherland Sharks	24	6	1	17	2	394	666	-272	17
15	Sydney Roosters	24	6	0	18	2	480	721	-241	16
16	North Queensland Cowboys	24	4	3	17	2	455	696	-241	15
