= 2008 South Sydney Rabbitohs season =

- NRL rank: First Grade
- Play-off result: Missed the Finals
- 2008 record: Wins: 8; losses: 16

Team information
- CEO: Shane Richardson
- Coach: Jason Taylor
- Captain: Roy Asotasi, David Kidwell
- Stadium: ANZ Stadium

Top scorers
- Tries: Nathan Merritt (13)
- Goals: (Australia)
- Points: Issac Luke (106)
← 2007	2009 →

The 2008 South Sydney Rabbitohs season was the 99th in the club's history. Coached by Jason Taylor and captained by David Kidwell & Roy Asotasi, the team competed in the National Rugby League's 2008 Telstra Premiership, finishing the regular season in 14th place out of 16 teams and so failing to reach the finals. The club also competed in the 2008 Under-20s competition.

On 26 January 2008, the Rabbitohs played the Leeds Rhinos at the Hodges Stadium at University of North Florida in Jacksonville, Florida, the first time first-grade professional rugby league teams from Australia and England played each other in the United States. A crowd of about 12,000 attended with Russell Crowe, Greg Norman, and the stars of television show American Chopper among the audience. Leeds Rhinos won the game 26-24(after having been behind 26-0 at half-time South Sydney staged an unlikely comeback that fell agonisingly short).

South Sydney equalled the second-biggest comeback in premiership history in Round 16 against the North Queensland Cowboys. After trailing 28–4 after fifty minutes, the Rabbitohs won the match 29–28.

No Rabbitohs players were selected for the 2008 State of Origin series, however at the end of season 2008 Rugby League World Cup tournament four were selected to play for Tonga (Manase Manuokafoa, Eddie Paea, Fetuli Talanoa and Joel Taufa'ao); three for the successful New Zealand squad (David Fa'alogo, David Kidwell and Issac Luke) and one captained Samoa (Nigel Vagana).

== Ladder ==
2008 NRL season
Pos	Team	Pld	W	D	L	B	PF	PA	PD	Pts
1	Melbourne Storm	24	17	0	7	2	584	282	+302	38
2	Manly Warringah Sea Eagles (P)	24	17	0	7	2	645	355	+290	38
3	Cronulla-Sutherland Sharks	24	17	0	7	2	451	384	+67	38
4	Sydney Roosters	24	15	0	9	2	511	446	+65	34
5	Brisbane Broncos	24	14	1	9	2	560	452	+108	33
6	Canberra Raiders	24	13	0	11	2	640	527	+113	30
7	St George Illawarra Dragons	24	13	0	11	2	489	378	+111	30
8	New Zealand Warriors	24	13	0	11	2	502	567	-65	30
9	Newcastle Knights	24	12	0	12	2	516	486	+30	28
10	Wests Tigers	24	11	0	13	2	528	560	-32	26
11	Parramatta Eels	24	11	0	13	2	501	547	-46	26
12	Penrith Panthers	24	10	1	13	2	504	611	-107	25
13	Gold Coast Titans	24	10	0	14	2	476	586	-110	24
14	South Sydney Rabbitohs	24	8	0	16	2	453	666	-213	20
15	North Queensland Cowboys	24	5	0	19	2	474	638	-164	14
16	Canterbury-Bankstown Bulldogs	24	5	0	19	2	433	782	-349	14

== Player statistics ==
Player	Appearances	Tries	Goals	Field Goals	Total Points
–	–	–	–	–	–

== Representative Honours ==
Player	All Stars	ANZAC Test	Pacific Test	City / Country	State of Origin 1	State of Origin 2	State of Origin 3	Four Nations
