= 2008 Wests Tigers season =

← 2007	2009 →

The 2008 Wests Tigers season was their 9th in the NRL. Major signings for the 2008 season are former Dragons halfback Mathew Head, backrower Corey Payne, and back Nick Youngquest.

== Season summary ==
The Tigers had a successful opening to the season with a round 1 win over the St George Illawarra Dragons, 24–16 and a torrid round 2 win over the North Queensland Cowboys in Townsville, 30–10.

Benji Marshall was injured in the third minute of round 1 with a knee ligament tear, sidelining him for eight to ten weeks.

Three losses in a row and injuries to hooker, Robbie Farah, kept the Tigers in the bottom half of the ladder until a round 6 win against the South Sydney Rabbitohs at the Sydney Cricket Ground on 20 April. Mathew Head returned to the NRL in round 5 after a year in the UK and recuperating from injury. Tigers then narrowly beat Cronulla Sharks 20-18.

Robbie Farah and Benji Marshall both returned to the team in the round 10 win against the Newcastle Knights. In a match that saw twelve tries scored between the two teams, Marshall scored two tries and kicked a 40/20. Mathew Head and Scott Dureau (Knights) also kicked 40/20s.

After a four game losing streak, the Wests Tigers ended the South Sydney Rabbitohs' run of five-straight wins, beating them 36–12 in round 19.

Another run of losses towards the end of the season kept the Wests Tigers out of the top eight for the third year in a row. The three losses coincided with the suspension of Todd Payten for a dangerous throw in round 22.

In the final match of the season, the Wests Tigers farewelled captain Brett Hodgson with a win over the Gold Coast Titans at Robina.

Players leaving the club at the end of the season include Brett Hodgson, Ryan O'Hara, Ben Te'o and Stuart Flanagan. It was also club CEO Steve Noyce's last year with the club.

== 2008 Season Results ==
2008 Season Results
Round	Opponent	Result	Date	Venue	Crowd	Referee	Position/16
1	St. George Illawarra Dragons	Win	16 March 2008	Sydney Football Stadium (H)	18,211	Sean Hampstead	6th
1	St. George Illawarra Dragons	24 - Wests Tigers (Tries: Fulton, Lawrence, Farah, Moltzen; Goals: Hodgson 4/4) 16 - Dragons (Tries: Gasnier, Soward, Reynoldson; Goals: Gasnier 0/1, Soward 2/2)					6th
2	North Queensland Cowboys	Win	22 March 2008	Dairy Farmers Stadium (A)	20,655	Tony De Las Heras	2nd
2	North Queensland Cowboys	30 - Wests Tigers (Tries: Farah, Harrison, Lawrence, Moltzen, Fulton; Goals: Hodgson 3/3 Lawrence 2/5) 10 - Cowboys (Tries: Graham, Harris; Goals: Thurston 1/2)					2nd
3	Bulldogs	Loss	30 March 2008	ANZ Stadium (A)	21,546	Jared Maxwell	6th
3	Bulldogs	32 - Bulldogs (Tries: Patten 2, El Masri, S Williams, Nanai, Ryan; Goals: El Masri 4/6) 12 - Wests Tigers (Tries: Ryan, Halatau; Goals: Hodgson 2/2)					6th
4	Penrith Panthers	Loss	7 April 2008	Campbelltown Stadium (H)	11,898	Jason Robinson	11th
4	Penrith Panthers	30 - Penrith Panthers (Tries: Priddis, Jennings, Blair, Gordon, Tighe; Goals: Sammut 5/6 ) 8 - Wests Tigers (Tries: Ryan; Goals: Hodgson 2/2 )					11th
5	Canberra Raiders; 1989 League Legends Cup	Loss	13 April 2008	Canberra Stadium (A)	12,240	Sean Hampstead	10th
5	Canberra Raiders; 1989 League Legends Cup	30 - Canberra Raiders (Tries:Purtell 3, Tilse, Tongue, Carney; Goals: Carney 3/6) 24 - Wests Tigers (Tries: Harrison 2, Tuiaki, Collis; Goals: Hodgson 4/4)					10th
6	South Sydney Rabbitohs	Win	20 April 2008	SCG (H)	19,122	Ben Cummins	8th
6	South Sydney Rabbitohs	30 - Wests Tigers (Tries: Heighington, Collis, Te'o, Lawrence, Flanagan; Goals: Hodgson 5/5) 10 - South Sydney Rabbitohs (Tries: Champion, Rogers; Goals: Merritt 1/2)					8th
7	Cronulla Sharks	Win	27 April 2008	Toyota Stadium (A)	17,241	Shayne Hayne	7th
7	Cronulla Sharks	20 - Wests Tigers (Tries: Lawrence 2, Heighington, Hodgson; Goals: Hodgson 2/4) 16 - Cronulla Sharks (Tries: Kearney, Seymour; Goals: Covell 4/4)					7th
8	Brisbane Broncos	Loss	3 May 2008	ANZ Stadium (H)	11,177	Tony Archer	8th
8	Brisbane Broncos	34 - Brisbane Broncos (Tries: Robinson 2, Kemp, Thaiday, Hunt, Wallace; Goals: Ennis 4/5, Wallace 1/1) 22 - Wests Tigers (Tries: Te'o 2, McDonnell, Collis; Goals: Hodgson 3/4)					8th
9	Bye						
10	Newcastle Knights	Win	18 May 2008	EnergyAustralia Stadium (A)	20,154	Sean Hampstead	8th
10	Newcastle Knights	38 - Wests Tigers (Tries: Hodgson 2, Marshall 2, Fulton, McDonnell, Te'o; Goals:Hodgson 5/7 ) 26 - Newcastle Knights (Tries:Bailey 3, Dureau, Vuna; Goals: Naiqama 3/5)					8th
11	Gold Coast Titans	Win	25 May 2008	Leichhardt Oval (H)	17,493	Shayne Hayne	7th
11	Gold Coast Titans	20 - Wests Tigers (Tries:Te'o, Farah, Hodgson; Goals:Hodgson 3/4 ) 18 - Gold Coast Titans (Tries:Cannings, Bowen, Campbell; Goals:Prince 3/3 )					7th
12	Sydney Roosters	Loss	2 June 2008	Sydney Football Stadium (A)	15,204	Tony Archer	8th
12	Sydney Roosters	19 - Sydney Roosters (Tries:M Aubusson 2, Roberts; Goals:Fitzgibbon 3/3; Field Goal:Pearce 1 ) 10 - Wests Tigers (Tries:Farah, Tuiaki; Goals:Hodgson 1/2 )					8th
13	North Queensland Cowboys	Win	7 June 2008	Campbelltown Stadium (H)	10,488	Gavin Badger	7th
13	North Queensland Cowboys	40 - Wests Tigers (Tries: Collis, McDonnell, Head, Te'o, Heighington, Marshall, Hodgson; Goals: Hodgson 6/7) 16 - North Queensland Cowboys (Tries: Slyney, T. Williams, Harris; Goals: J. Williams 2/3)					7th
14	Parramatta Eels	Loss	15 June 2008	ANZ Stadium (H)	22,107	Tony Archer	11th
14	Parramatta Eels	44 - Parramatta Eels (Tries: Hindmarsh 2, Burt, Cordoba, Tautai, Keating, Inu, Reddy; Goals: Burt 6/8) 6 - Wests Tigers (Tries: Lawrence; Goals: Hodgson 1/1)					11th
15	Brisbane Broncos	Loss	20 June 2008	Suncorp Stadium (A)	27,864	Sean Hampstead	12th
15	Brisbane Broncos	19 - Brisbane Broncos (Tries: Moon, Kemp, Kenny; Goals: Ennis 3/4 Field Goal: Hunt 1) 18 - Wests Tigers (Tries: Hodgson, Halatau, Fulton; Goals: Hodgson 3/4)					12th
16	New Zealand Warriors	Loss	29 June 2008	Leichhardt Oval (H)	15,827	Steve Lyons	12th
16	New Zealand Warriors	28 - Warriors (Tries: Henderson, Fai, Fein, Hohaia, Rapira; Goals: Hohaia 2/3, Witt 2/2) 26 - Wests Tigers (Tries: Tuiaki 3, Farah, Lawrence; Goals: Hodgson 3/5)					12th
17	Bye						10th
18	Melbourne Storm	Loss	14 July 2008	Campbelltown Stadium (H)	16,653	Jared Maxwell	12th
18	Melbourne Storm	30 - Melbourne Storm (Tries: Inglis 3, Slater, Manu; Goals: Smith 5/5) 18 - Wests Tigers (Tries: Tuiaki, Hodgson, Ryan; Goals: Hodgson 3/3)					12th
19	South Sydney Rabbitohs	Win	20 July 2008	ANZ Stadium (A)	21,818	Jason Robinson	10th
19	South Sydney Rabbitohs	36 - Wests Tigers (Tries: Tuiaki 2, Lawrence 2, Ryan 2, Farah; Goals: Marshall 4/7) 12 - South Sydney Rabbitohs (Tries: Simpson, Asotasi; Goals: Luke 2/2)					10th
20	Penrith Panthers	Loss	26 July 2008	CUA Stadium (A)	14,075	Tony Archer	12th
20	Penrith Panthers	24 - Penrith Panthers (Tries: Gordon 2, Iosefa, Jennings; Goals: Gordon 4/4) 10 - Wests Tigers (Tries: Tagive, Laurie; Goals: Marshall 1/2)					12th
21	Bulldogs	Win	3 August 2008	ANZ Stadium (H)	16,121	Ben Cummins	9th
21	Bulldogs	56 - Wests Tigers (Tries:Gallant 2, Heighington 2, Te'o 2, Fulton, Tagive, Halatau, Marshall; Goals: Marshall 8/10) 4 - Bulldogs (Tries: Nanai; Goals: El Masri 0/1)					9th
22	St. George Illawarra Dragons	Win	8 August 2008	WIN Stadium (A)	14,207	Shayne Hayne	9th
22	St. George Illawarra Dragons	18 - Wests Tigers (Tries: Ryan, Marshall; Goals: Marshall 5/5) 10 - St. George Illawarra (Tries: J Morris; Goals: Soward 3/3)					9th
23	Parramatta Eels	Loss	18 August 2008	Parramatta Stadium (A)	13,065	Matt Cecchin	11th
23	Parramatta Eels	40 - Parramatta (Tries: Tautai 2, Hayne 2, Moi Moi, Hindmarsh, Mateo; Goals: Inu 8/9) 12 - Wests Tigers (Tries: Marshall, Heighington; Goals: Hodgson 2/2)					11th
24	Manly-Warringah Sea Eagles	Loss	23 August 2008	ANZ Stadium (H)	27,564	Tony Archer	12th
24	Manly-Warringah Sea Eagles	48 - Manly (Tries: B Stewart 2, Menzies 2, Hall 2, Robertson, Bell, G Stewart; Goals: Orford 5/8, Matai 1/1) 16 - Wests Tigers (Tries: Laurie 2, Ryan; Goals: Hodgson 2/3)					12th
25	Cronulla Sharks	Loss	29 August 2008	Leichhardt Oval (H)	10,766	Sean Hampstead	12th
25	Cronulla Sharks	32 - Cronulla (Tries: Taulapapa, Covell, Anderson, Seymour, Kearney; Goals: Covell 6/6) 6 - Wests Tigers (Tries:Harrison; Goals: Hodgson 1/1)					12th
26	Gold Coast Titans	Win	7 September 2008	Skilled Park (A)	20,703	Bernie Sutton	10th
26	Gold Coast Titans	28 - Wests Tigers (Tries: Moltzen 2, Lawrence, Tuiaki, Ryan; Goals: Hodgson 4/5) 12 - Gold Coast (Tries: Prince, Delaney; Goals: Prince 2/2)					10th

== 2008 Pre-season trials ==
Wests Tigers 2008 Pre-season Trials
Opponent	Result	Date	Venue	Crowd	Referee
Sydney Roosters; Foundation Cup	Loss	23 February 2008	Sydney Football Stadium	15,197	Sean Hampstead
Sydney Roosters; Foundation Cup	34 - Sydney Roosters (Tries: Kenny-Dowall 3, Minichiello, Anasta, Tupou; Goals: Roberts 5/6) 28 - Wests Tigers (Tries: Moltzen, Lawrence, Morris, Tagive, Marshall; Goals: Hodgson 4/5)				
Gold Coast Titans; Larry Corowa Shield	Loss	1 March 2008	Skilled Park, Robina	14,386	
Gold Coast Titans; Larry Corowa Shield	32 - Gold Coast Titans (Tries: Minichiello, Cannings, Bowen, Atkins, Prince, Ngawini; Goals: Prince 4/6) 4 - Wests Tigers (Tries: Lawrence; Goals: Hodgson 0/1)				

== 2008 Season Ladder ==
2008 NRL season
Pos	Team	Pld	W	D	L	B	PF	PA	PD	Pts
1	Melbourne Storm	24	17	0	7	2	584	282	+302	38
2	Manly Warringah Sea Eagles (P)	24	17	0	7	2	645	355	+290	38
3	Cronulla-Sutherland Sharks	24	17	0	7	2	451	384	+67	38
4	Sydney Roosters	24	15	0	9	2	511	446	+65	34
5	Brisbane Broncos	24	14	1	9	2	560	452	+108	33
6	Canberra Raiders	24	13	0	11	2	640	527	+113	30
7	St George Illawarra Dragons	24	13	0	11	2	489	378	+111	30
8	New Zealand Warriors	24	13	0	11	2	502	567	-65	30
9	Newcastle Knights	24	12	0	12	2	516	486	+30	28
10	Wests Tigers	24	11	0	13	2	528	560	-32	26
11	Parramatta Eels	24	11	0	13	2	501	547	-46	26
12	Penrith Panthers	24	10	1	13	2	504	611	-107	25
13	Gold Coast Titans	24	10	0	14	2	476	586	-110	24
14	South Sydney Rabbitohs	24	8	0	16	2	453	666	-213	20
15	North Queensland Cowboys	24	5	0	19	2	474	638	-164	14
16	Canterbury-Bankstown Bulldogs	24	5	0	19	2	433	782	-349	14

== Players Used ==
Current first-grade squad at 22 March 2008

No.

Position
Player

Brett Hodgson (captain) – FB Shannon McDonnell – FB Shannon Gallant – FB Taniela Tuiaki – WG Peni Tagive – WG (Debut: Round 1) Beau Ryan – WG Chris Lawrence – CE Dean Collis – CE Danny Galea – CE Benji Marshall – FE John Morris – HB Mathew Head – HB (Debut: Round 5) Tim Moltzen – HB (Debut: Round 1) Bryce Gibbs – PR Todd Payten – PR Ryan O'Hara – PR

No.

Position
Player

Luke Harlen – PR Daine Laurie – PR (Debut: Round 15) Ryan Tandy – PR (Debut: Round 15) Robbie Farah – HK Stuart Flanagan – HK Corey Payne – SR Dene Halatau – SR Bronson Harrison – SR Rocky Trimarchi – SR Keith Galloway – SR Tevita Metuisela – SR Rhys Hanbury – SR (Debut: Round 2) Ben Te'o – SR Liam Fulton – LK Chris Heighington – LK

=== Gains and losses ===
2008 Player Movements
Gains		Losses	
Player	Previous club	Player	New Club
Linton Price	Leeton	Ben Galea	Hull Kingston Rovers
Benson Tupou	Leeton	Daniel Fitzhenry	Hull Kingston Rovers
Noah Fotu	Leeton	Paul Whatuira	Huddersfield Giants
Todd Bridge	Taree	Ben Jeffery	Gold Coast Titans
Joe Latham	Wingham	Jai Ayoub	Sydney Roosters
Soueli Makaui	Keebra Park State High School	Jason Moodie	Retired
Lio Viaga	Keebra Park State High School	Jarrod Saffy	St. George Illawarra Dragons
Corey Payne	St George Illawarra	Nick Youngquest	Bulldogs
Nick Youngquest	Penrith Panthers	Luke Harlen	Northern Pride RLFC
Mathew Head	Hull F.C.	Mathew Head	St. George Illawarra Dragons
