= 2008 New Zealand Warriors season =

- NRL rank: 8th
- 2008 record: Wins: 15; draws: 0; losses: 12
- Points scored: For: 502; against: 567

Team information
- CEO: Wayne Scurrah
- Coach: Ivan Cleary
- Assistant coach: John Ackland
- Captains: Steve Price; Micheal Luck Ruben Wiki
- Stadium: Mt Smart Stadium
- Avg. attendance: 12,528

Top scorers
- Tries: Manu Vatuvei (16)
- Goals: Michael Witt (59)
- Points: Michael Witt (138)
← 2007	2009 →

The New Zealand Warriors 2008 season was the New Zealand Warriors 14th first-grade season. The club competed in Australasia's National Rugby League. The coach of the team was Ivan Cleary while Steve Price was the club's captain.

== Milestones ==
- 31 March – Round 3: Grant Rovelli played in his 50th match for the club.
- 19 April – Round 6: Lance Hohaia played in his 100th match for the club.
- 22 June – Round 15: Sam Rapira played in his 50th match for the club.
- 14 September – Qualifying Finals: The Warriors become the first team finishing eighth to beat the minor premiers when they defeat the Melbourne Storm, 18 – 15.
- October–November: 11 players from the club participated in the World Cup: Steve Price, Brent Tate (Australia), Nathan Fien, Lance Hohaia, Simon Mannering, Sam Rapira, Jerome Ropati, Evarn Tuimavave, Manu Vatuvei (New Zealand), Ian Henderson (Scotland), Epalahame Lauaki (Tonga). In addition, John Ackland coached Samoa and Wairangi Koopu played for the New Zealand Māori side in the Welcome to Country match.

== Jersey and sponsors ==

The Warriors again did not change their jersey, sticking with the predominantly Black & White design supplied by Puma AG. The away jersey also remained unchanged, being mainly Grey with Black details. For the "Heritage Round" the Warriors played in a strip based on their 1999 Red away strip

== Fixtures ==
The Warriors used Mt Smart Stadium as their home ground in 2008, their only home ground since they entered the competition in 1995.

=== Trial Matches ===
Date	Round	Opponent	Venue	Result	Score	Tries	Goals	Attendance	Report
15 February	Trial 1	Newcastle Knights	North Harbour Stadium, Auckland	Loss	14–22	Ah Van, Vatuvei, Koopu	Witt (1)	9,000	
23 February	Trial 2	Auckland Vulcans	Henham Park, Auckland	Win	50–0	Solomona (2), Hohaia (2), Fien, Witt, Locke, Taylor, Mika	Witt (7)		
29 February	Trial 3	Manly Sea Eagles	Stockland Park, Sunshine Coast	Loss	16–24	Rovelli, Witt, Solomona	Witt (2)	8,040	

=== Regular season ===
Date	Round	Opponent	Venue	Result	Score	Tries	Goals	Attendance	Report
17 March	Round 1	Melbourne Storm	Telstra Dome, Melbourne	Loss	18–32	Vatuvei (2), Ropati	Witt (3)	20,084	
23 March	Round 2	Parramatta Eels	Mt Smart Stadium, Auckland	Win	30–16	Vatuvei (2), Rovelli, Tate, Tuimavave	Witt (5)	15,250	
31 March	Round 3	Manly Sea Eagles	Brookvale Oval, Sydney	Loss	6–52	Hohaia	Witt (1)	10,175	
6 April	Round 4	Newcastle Knights	Mt Smart Stadium, Auckland	Win	26–20	Shortland (2), Ah Van, Tuimavave	Witt (5)	11,518	
13 April	Round 5	Bulldogs	Mt Smart Stadium, Auckland	Win	36–16	Vatuvei (2), Ah Van, Fai, Hohaia, Wiki	Witt (6)	15,912	
19 April	Round 6	North Queensland Cowboys	Dairy Farmers Stadium, Townsville	Loss	20–48	Henderson, Ropati, Mannering	Witt (4)	20,544	
27 April	Round 7	Gold Coast Titans	Skilled Park, Gold Coast	Loss	24–36	Witt (2), Luck, Vatuvei	Witt (4)	25,310	
4 May	Round 8	Canberra Raiders	Mt Smart Stadium, Auckland	Win	14–6	Shortland, Tate	Witt (3)	7,358	
	Round 9	Bye			–				
18 May	Round 10	Penrith Panthers	CUA Stadium, Sydney	Loss	22–46	Mannering (2), Henderson Packer	Hohaia (3)	9,450	
25 May	Round 11	Sydney Roosters	Mt Smart Stadium, Auckland	Loss	12–38	Henderson, Kirk	Hohaia (2)	11,922	
31 May	Round 12	Newcastle Knights	EnergyAustralia Stadium, Newcastle	Win	18–16	Ah Van, Crockett, Henderson	Ah Van (3)	15,489	
6 June	Round 13	South Sydney Rabbitohs	Mt Smart Stadium, Auckland	Loss	28–35	Crockett (3), Ah Van, Kirk, Ropati	Ah Van (1), Hohaia (1)	13,112	
13 June	Round 14	Cronulla Sharks	Toyota Park, Sydney	Loss	8–24	Ropati	Hohaia (2)	9,023	
22 June	Round 15	Manly Sea Eagles	Mt Smart Stadium, Auckland	Loss	14–20	Kirk, Vatuvei, Mannering	Witt (1)	7,141	
29 June	Round 16	Wests Tigers	Leichhardt Oval, Sydney	Win	28–26	Fai, Fien, Henderson, Hohaia, Ropati	Hohaia (2), Witt (2)	15,027	
	Round 17	Bye			–				
12 July	Round 18	North Queensland Cowboys	Mt Smart Stadium, Auckland	Win	24–14	Fai, Kirk, Luck, Mannering, Ropati	Hohaia (2)	7,722	
19 July	Round 19	Bulldogs	ANZ Stadium, Sydney	Win	40–22	Solomona (3), Fai, Hohaia, Kirk, Price, Rapira	Hohaia (4)	12,973	
27 July	Round 20	Melbourne Storm	Mt Smart Stadium, Auckland	Win	8–6	Fai	Hohaia (2)	8,700	
2 August	Round 21	South Sydney Rabbitohs	ANZ Stadium, Sydney	Loss	18–16	Hohaia (2), Ropati	Hohaia (2)	9,276	
9 August	Round 22	Brisbane Broncos	Mt Smart Stadium, Auckland	Win	16–12	Matulino, McKinnon, Witt	Witt (2)	13,007	
16 August	Round 23	Cronulla Sharks	Mt Smart Stadium, Auckland	Win	18–4	Hohaia, Ropati, Vatuvei	Witt (3)	10,417	
24 August	Round 24	St. George Illawarra Dragons	WIN Stadium, Wollongong	Loss	6–36	McKinnon	Witt (1)	11,583	
31 August	Round 25	Penrith Panthers	Mt Smart Stadium, Auckland	Win	42–20	Vatuvei (2), Henderson, Luck, McKinnon, Ropati, Witt	Witt (7)	15,214	
6 September	Round 26	Parramatta Eels	Parramatta Stadium, Sydney	Win	28–6	Vatuvei (3), Tate (2)	Witt (4)	5,102	

=== Finals ===
Qualifying finals
1	Melbourne	15
8	New Zealand	18
2	Manly	38
7	St. George Illawarra	6
3	Cronulla	36
6	Canberra	10
4	Sydney	16
5	Brisbane	24

Semifinals
4W	New Zealand	30
2L	Sydney	13
3W	Brisbane	14
1L	Melbourne	16

Preliminary finals
1W	Manly	32
New Zealand	6
2W	Cronulla	0
Melbourne	28

Final
Manly	40
Melbourne	0

Date	Round	Opponent	Venue	Result	Score	Tries	Goals	Attendance	Report
14 September	Qualifying Final	Melbourne Storm	Olympic Park Stadium, Melbourne	Win	18–15	Ropati, Vatuvei, Witt	Witt (3)	15,193	
19 September	Semi Final	Sydney Roosters	Mt Smart Stadium, Auckland	Win	30–13	Hohaia (2), Henderson, Kirk, Vatuvei	Witt (5)	25,585	
27 September	Preliminary Final	Manly Sea Eagles	Sydney Football Stadium, Sydney	Loss	6–32	Kirk	Hohaia (1)	32,095	

== Ladder ==
2008 NRL season
Pos	Team	Pld	W	D	L	B	PF	PA	PD	Pts
1	Melbourne Storm	24	17	0	7	2	584	282	+302	38
2	Manly Warringah Sea Eagles (P)	24	17	0	7	2	645	355	+290	38
3	Cronulla-Sutherland Sharks	24	17	0	7	2	451	384	+67	38
4	Sydney Roosters	24	15	0	9	2	511	446	+65	34
5	Brisbane Broncos	24	14	1	9	2	560	452	+108	33
6	Canberra Raiders	24	13	0	11	2	640	527	+113	30
7	St George Illawarra Dragons	24	13	0	11	2	489	378	+111	30
8	New Zealand Warriors	24	13	0	11	2	502	567	-65	30
9	Newcastle Knights	24	12	0	12	2	516	486	+30	28
10	Wests Tigers	24	11	0	13	2	528	560	-32	26
11	Parramatta Eels	24	11	0	13	2	501	547	-46	26
12	Penrith Panthers	24	10	1	13	2	504	611	-107	25
13	Gold Coast Titans	24	10	0	14	2	476	586	-110	24
14	South Sydney Rabbitohs	24	8	0	16	2	453	666	-213	20
15	North Queensland Cowboys	24	5	0	19	2	474	638	-164	14
16	Canterbury-Bankstown Bulldogs	24	5	0	19	2	433	782	-349	14

== Squad ==
Twenty Six players played for the club in 2008. Eight players made their debut for the club, including five who were also making their first grade debuts.

No.	Name	Nationality	Position	Warriors debut	App	T	G	FG	Pts
42	Logan Swann	(New Zealand)	SR	1 March 1997	24	0	0	0	0
64	Wairangi Koopu	(New Zealand)	CE / SR	9 April 1999	6	0	0	0	0
99	Lance Hohaia	(New Zealand)	UB	6 April 2002	26	9	21	0	78
102	Evarn Tuimavave	(New Zealand)	PR	1 September 2002	25	2	0	0	8
108	Jerome Ropati	(New Zealand)	CE / FE	31 August 2003	22	9	0	0	36
110	Epalahame Lauaki	(New Zealand) / (Tonga)	SR	14 March 2004	16	0	0	0	0
115	Manu Vatuvei	(New Zealand)	WG	23 May 2004	17	16	0	0	64
121	Steve Price	(Australia)	PR	13 March 2005	17	1	0	0	4
123	Ruben Wiki	(New Zealand)	PR	13 March 2005	24	1	0	0	4
124	Nathan Fien	(New Zealand)	HK	13 March 2005	27	1	0	0	4
125	Simon Mannering	(New Zealand)	CE	26 June 2005	27	5	0	0	20
126	Micheal Luck	(Australia)	SR	12 March 2006	25	3	0	0	12
127	Grant Rovelli	(Italy)	HB	12 March 2006	21	1	0	0	4
129	Patrick Ah Van	(New Zealand)	WG	9 April 2006	12	4	4	0	24
131	Sam Rapira	(New Zealand)	PR	20 May 2006	27	2	0	0	8
132	Wade McKinnon	(Australia)	FB	17 March 2007	5	3	0	0	12
133	Michael Crockett	(Australia)	WG	17 March 2007	6	4	0	0	12
134	Michael Witt	(Australia)	FE	17 March 2007	18	5	59	0	138
136	Aidan Kirk	(Australia)	FB / CE	17 March 2008	15	7	0	0	28
137	Brent Tate	(Australia)	CE	17 March 2008	24	4	0	0	16
138	Ian Henderson	(Scotland)	HK	23 March 2008	26	7	0	0	28
139	Sonny Fai	(New Zealand)	SR	23 March 2008	15	5	0	0	20
140	Ryan Shortland	(New Zealand)	CE	6 April 2008	5	3	0	0	12
141	Russell Packer	(New Zealand)	PR	4 May 2008	5	1	0	0	4
142	Ben Matulino	(New Zealand)	SR	14 June 2008	15	1	0	0	4
143	Malo Solomona	(Samoa)	WG	29 June 2008	8	3	0	0	12

== Staff ==
- Chief Executive Officer: Wayne Scurrah

=== NRL Staff ===
- Head coach: Ivan Cleary
- Assistant coach: John Ackland
- Football manager: Don Mann, Jr.
- Club doctor: John Mayhew
- Trainer: Craig Walker

=== NYC Staff ===
- Head coach: Tony Iro
- Team Manager: Dean Bell

== Transfers ==
=== Gains ===
Player	Previous club	Length	Notes
Brent Tate	Brisbane Broncos		
Ian Henderson	Bradford Bulls		
Ryan Shortland	Melbourne Storm		

=== Losses ===
Player	Club	Notes
George Gatis	Huddersfield Giants	
Todd Byrne	Hull	
Louis Anderson	Warrington Wolves	
Tony Martin	Wakefield Trinity Wildcats	

== Other teams ==
In 2008 the Junior Warriors competed in the new Under 20's competition, the Toyota Cup, while Senior players who were not required for the first team played with the Auckland Vulcans in the NSW Cup. The Auckland Vulcans were coached by Bernie Perenara. Wayne McDade was named the Vulcans player of the year with Aaron Heremaia as the runner up and Pita Godinet as the Rookie of the year.

=== Junior Warriors ===
The Junior Warriors finished third in the Toyota Cup, making the finals before losing to the Brisbane Broncos in a Preliminary Final. Both Russell Packer and Ben Matulino were named in the Toyota Cup's team of the year.

2008 Toyota Cup season
Pos	Team	Pld	W	D	L	B	PF	PA	PD	Pts
1	Canberra Raiders (P)	24	18	0	6	2	744	581	+163	40
2	Brisbane Broncos	24	15	1	8	2	684	476	+208	35
3	New Zealand Warriors	24	14	3	7	2	721	533	+188	35
4	Penrith Panthers	24	15	1	8	2	692	583	+109	35
5	Parramatta Eels	24	14	3	7	2	578	564	+14	35
6	St George Illawarra Dragons	24	13	2	9	2	561	520	+41	32
7	Canterbury-Bankstown Bulldogs	24	12	3	9	2	711	587	+124	31
8	Gold Coast Titans	24	13	1	10	2	686	567	+119	31
9	Wests Tigers	24	13	0	11	2	620	623	-3	30
10	South Sydney Rabbitohs	24	11	2	11	2	618	584	+34	28
11	Manly Warringah Sea Eagles	24	11	0	13	2	519	532	-13	26
12	Newcastle Knights	24	8	1	15	2	526	630	-104	21
13	Melbourne Storm	24	8	1	15	2	512	638	-126	21
14	Cronulla-Sutherland Sharks	24	6	1	17	2	394	666	-272	17
15	Sydney Roosters	24	6	0	18	2	480	721	-241	16
16	North Queensland Cowboys	24	4	3	17	2	455	696	-241	15

Qualifying finals
1	Canberra Raiders	43
8	Brisbane Broncos	28
2	NZ Warriors	47
7	Penrith Panthers	16
3	Parramatta Eels	24
6	St. George Illawarra	20
4	Bulldogs	22
5	Gold Coast Titans	12

Semifinals
4W	Parramatta Eels	22
2L	St. George Illawarra	23
3W	NZ Warriors	38
1L	Penrith Panthers	4

Preliminary finals
1W	Canberra Raiders	18
St. George Illawarra	14
2W	Brisbane Broncos	28
NZ Warriors	26

Final
Canberra Raiders	28
Brisbane Broncos	24

== Awards ==
Simon Mannering won the Player of the Year award.
