= 2008 Parramatta Eels season =

Australia Rugby League Parramatta Eels 2008 season

- NRL Rank: 11th
- Play-off result: DNQ
- World Club Challenge: DNQ
- 2008 record: Wins: 11; draws: 0; losses: 13
- Points scored: For: 501; against: 547

Team information
- CEO: Denis Fitzgerald
- Coach: (Australia) Michael Hagan
- Captain: (New Zealand) Nathan Cayless
- Stadium: Parramatta Stadium (Capacity: 20,741); ANZ Stadium (Capacity: 83,500)
- Avg. attendance: 13,528 (Home); 16,300 (Home & Away)
- Agg. attendance: 162,335 (Home); 391,195 (Home & Away)
- High attendance: 25,065 (15 March vs Canterbury-Bankstown Bulldogs, Round 1)

Top scorers
- Tries: (Australia) Joel Reddy (12)
- Goals: (Australia) Luke Burt (62)
- Points: (Australia) Luke Burt (169)
← 2007	List of seasons	2009 →

The 2008 Parramatta Eels season was the 62nd in the club's history. Coached by Michael Hagan and captained by Nathan Cayless, they competed in the National Rugby League's 2008 Telstra Premiership.

== Summary ==
After being billed at premiership contenders by several prominent betting agencies, including TAB SportsBet, the Parramatta Eels failed to impress in the 2008, a season that could only be described as a huge disappointment. The Eels finished 11th in an inconsistent season marred by Jarryd Hayne's controversial shooting incident in the pre-season. Despite the poor performance by Parramatta, CEO Denis Fitzgerald stressed that Michael Hagan's position as club coach was not in danger. Michael Hagan resigned as coach on 21 October 2008, citing family and health reasons for his decision.

== Standings ==
=== National Rugby League ===
2008 NRL season
Pos	Team	Pld	W	D	L	B	PF	PA	PD	Pts
1	Melbourne Storm	24	17	0	7	2	584	282	+302	38
2	Manly Warringah Sea Eagles (P)	24	17	0	7	2	645	355	+290	38
3	Cronulla-Sutherland Sharks	24	17	0	7	2	451	384	+67	38
4	Sydney Roosters	24	15	0	9	2	511	446	+65	34
5	Brisbane Broncos	24	14	1	9	2	560	452	+108	33
6	Canberra Raiders	24	13	0	11	2	640	527	+113	30
7	St George Illawarra Dragons	24	13	0	11	2	489	378	+111	30
8	New Zealand Warriors	24	13	0	11	2	502	567	-65	30
9	Newcastle Knights	24	12	0	12	2	516	486	+30	28
10	Wests Tigers	24	11	0	13	2	528	560	-32	26
11	Parramatta Eels	24	11	0	13	2	501	547	-46	26
12	Penrith Panthers	24	10	1	13	2	504	611	-107	25
13	Gold Coast Titans	24	10	0	14	2	476	586	-110	24
14	South Sydney Rabbitohs	24	8	0	16	2	453	666	-213	20
15	North Queensland Cowboys	24	5	0	19	2	474	638	-164	14
16	Canterbury-Bankstown Bulldogs	24	5	0	19	2	433	782	-349	14

=== National Youth Competition ===
2008 Toyota Cup season
Pos	Team	Pld	W	D	L	B	PF	PA	PD	Pts
1	Canberra Raiders (P)	24	18	0	6	2	744	581	+163	40
2	Brisbane Broncos	24	15	1	8	2	684	476	+208	35
3	New Zealand Warriors	24	14	3	7	2	721	533	+188	35
4	Penrith Panthers	24	15	1	8	2	692	583	+109	35
5	Parramatta Eels	24	14	3	7	2	578	564	+14	35
6	St George Illawarra Dragons	24	13	2	9	2	561	520	+41	32
7	Canterbury-Bankstown Bulldogs	24	12	3	9	2	711	587	+124	31
8	Gold Coast Titans	24	13	1	10	2	686	567	+119	31
9	Wests Tigers	24	13	0	11	2	620	623	-3	30
10	South Sydney Rabbitohs	24	11	2	11	2	618	584	+34	28
11	Manly Warringah Sea Eagles	24	11	0	13	2	519	532	-13	26
12	Newcastle Knights	24	8	1	15	2	526	630	-104	21
13	Melbourne Storm	24	8	1	15	2	512	638	-126	21
14	Cronulla-Sutherland Sharks	24	6	1	17	2	394	666	-272	17
15	Sydney Roosters	24	6	0	18	2	480	721	-241	16
16	North Queensland Cowboys	24	4	3	17	2	455	696	-241	15

== Players and staff ==
The playing squad and coaching staff of the Parramatta Eels for the 2008 NRL season as of 31 August 2008.

No.

Position
Player

585 Nathan Cayless – PR (c) 595 Nathan Hindmarsh – SR 601 Daniel Wagon – LK 602 Luke Burt – FB 608 Eric Grothe – WG jr. 617 Chad Robinson – SR 665 Fuifui Moimoi – PR 673 Feleti Mateo – LK 674 Ben Smith – CE 676 Mark Riddell – HK 683 Joel Reddy – CE 685 Josh Cordoba – PR

No.

Position
Player

690 Jarryd Hayne – CE 691 Brett Finch – FE 692 Todd Lowrie – SR 695 Krisnan Inu – WG 696 Junior Paulo – SR 697 Weller Hauraki – SR 698 Taulima Tautai – CE 699 Joe Galuvao – SR 700 Matt Keating – HK 701 Brendan Oake – SR 702 Kris Keating – FE Anthony Mitchell – HK

== Transfers ==
In:

Player	Previous club	Years signed	Until the end of
Joe Galuvao	Souths	2	2009

Out:

Player	Notes
Blake Green	Cronulla Sharks
Aaron Cannings	Gold Coast Titans
Richard Fa'aoso	Newcastle Knights
Peter John Marsh	Brisbane Broncos
Justin Tsoulos	Bulldogs
Zeb Taia	Mid Season to Newcastle Knights
Timana Tahu	Rugby Union
Ian Hindmarsh	Retired

== Awards ==
- Michael Cronin Clubman of the Year Award: Krisnan Inu
- Ken Thornett Medal (Players' player): Nathan Hindmarsh
- Jack Gibson Award (Coach's award): Matthew Keating
- Eric Grothe Rookie of the Year Award: Taulima Tautai
