= 2008 Sydney Roosters season =

- NRL rank: 6th
- 2008 record: Wins: 15; draws: 0; losses: 11
- Points scored: For: 540 (96tries, 77goals, 2fieldgoals);

Team information
- CEO: Steve Noyce
- Coach: Brad Fittler
- Captain: Craig Fitzgibbon, Braith Anasta
- Stadium: Sydney Football Stadium
- Avg. attendance: 13,951

Top scorers
- Tries: Shaun Kenny-Dowall 15
- Goals: Craig Fitzgibbon 62
- Points: Craig Fitzgibbon 136
← 2007	2009 →

The 2008 Sydney Roosters season was the 101st in the club's history. They competed in the NRL's 2008 Telstra Premiership and finished the regular season 4th out of 16. Despite losing their first finals match, the Roosters got another chance the following week but were knocked out by the New Zealand Warriors.

== Ladder ==
2008 NRL season
Pos	Team	Pld	W	D	L	B	PF	PA	PD	Pts
1	Melbourne Storm	24	17	0	7	2	584	282	+302	38
2	Manly Warringah Sea Eagles (P)	24	17	0	7	2	645	355	+290	38
3	Cronulla-Sutherland Sharks	24	17	0	7	2	451	384	+67	38
4	Sydney Roosters	24	15	0	9	2	511	446	+65	34
5	Brisbane Broncos	24	14	1	9	2	560	452	+108	33
6	Canberra Raiders	24	13	0	11	2	640	527	+113	30
7	St George Illawarra Dragons	24	13	0	11	2	489	378	+111	30
8	New Zealand Warriors	24	13	0	11	2	502	567	-65	30
9	Newcastle Knights	24	12	0	12	2	516	486	+30	28
10	Wests Tigers	24	11	0	13	2	528	560	-32	26
11	Parramatta Eels	24	11	0	13	2	501	547	-46	26
12	Penrith Panthers	24	10	1	13	2	504	611	-107	25
13	Gold Coast Titans	24	10	0	14	2	476	586	-110	24
14	South Sydney Rabbitohs	24	8	0	16	2	453	666	-213	20
15	North Queensland Cowboys	24	5	0	19	2	474	638	-164	14
16	Canterbury-Bankstown Bulldogs	24	5	0	19	2	433	782	-349	14

== Squad ==
The following players are contracted to the Sydney Roosters for the 2008 season.

No.

Position
Player

989 Craig Fitzgibbon – SR (c) 994 Anthony Minichiello – FB 1033 Lopini Paea – PR 1035 Anthony Tupou – LK 1040 Sam Perrett – WG 1046 Amos Roberts – WG 1047 Iosia Soliola – CE 1052 Mickey Paea – SR 1053 David Shillington – PR 1054 Shane Shackleton – SR 1055 Braith Anasta – FE 1061 Steve Meredith – PR 1063 Setaimata Sa – CE 1065 Shaun Foley – WG 1067 Mitchell Aubusson – CE

No.

Position
Player

1069 Shaun Kenny-Dowall – WG 1070 Nate Myles – SR 1071 Danny Nutley – PR 1072 Mitchell Pearce – HB 1074 Frank-Paul Nuuausala – PR Albert Hopoate – CE Jai Ayoub – HB Riley Brown – HK Daniel Howard – SR Tevita Folau – CE Rory Kostjaysn – HK James Aubusson – HK Willie Mason – SR Mark O'Meley – PR Brent Grose – WG

== Player movement ==
The Roosters have had a rather significant amount of player movement which will result in an extensive squad change from the 2007 season. The Roosters have lost 10 players from their 2007 squad and gained 4 new players, including high-profile signings Willie Mason and Mark O'Meley.

=== Gains ===
Name	From	Details
Mark O'Meley	Bulldogs	4-year contract
James Aubusson	Melbourne Storm	3-year contract
Willie Mason	Bulldogs	3-year contract
Brent Grose	Warrington Wolves	1-year contract
Riley Brown	Newcastle Knights	2-year contract

=== Losses ===
Name	Club Going To	Details
Craig Wing	South Sydney Rabbitohs	4-year contract
Joel Monaghan	Canberra Raiders	3-year contract
Jamie Soward	St George-Illawarra Dragons	2-year contract
Josh Lewis	Gold Coast Titans	3-year contract
Nigel Plum	Canberra Raiders	2-year contract
Chris Flannery	St Helens R.F.C.	4-year contract
Heath L'Estrange	Manly Sea Eagles	2-year contract
Ashley Harrison	Gold Coast Titans	3-year Contract
John Williams	North Queensland Cowboys	3-year Contract
Danny Williams	Bulldogs	2-year Contract
George Ndaira	South Sydney Rabbitohs	
Chris Beattie	Retired	

== 2008 results ==
	Opponent	Result	Score	Date	Venue
Trial	Dhunghutti Broncos	Win	48-0	15 February	Port Macquarie
Trial	Wauchope Wolves	Win	22-0	15 February	Port Macquarie
Trial	Port Macquarie Sharks	Win	24-4	15 February	Port Macquarie
Foundation Cup	Wests Tigers	Win	34-28	23 February	Sydney Football Stadium
Trial	Parramatta Eels	Loss	18-34	1 March	Bluetongue Stadium
Round 1	South Sydney Rabbitohs	Win	34-20	14 March	ANZ Stadium
Round 2	Brisbane Broncos	Loss	14-20	21 March	Sydney Football Stadium
Round 3	Melbourne Storm	Win	10-6	29 March	Sydney Football Stadium
Round 4	Bulldogs	Win	40-12	4 April	ANZ Stadium
Round 5	Penrith Panthers	Win	28-12	12 April	CUA Stadium
Round 6	Newcastle Knights	Loss	20-34	20 April	Bluetongue Stadium
Round 7	St. George-Illawarra Dragons	Loss	6-26	25 April	ANZ Stadium
Round 8	Bye	-	-		
Round 9	Canberra Raiders	Win	30-4	10 May	Sydney Football Stadium
Round 10	Parramatta Eels	Win	32-12	16 May	Parramatta Stadium
Round 11	New Zealand Warriors	Win	38-12	25 May	Mt Smart Stadium
Round 12	Wests Tigers	Win	19-10	2 June	Sydney Football Stadium
Round 13	Manly-Warringah Sea Eagles	Loss	0-42	7 June	Brookvale Oval
Round 14	Penrith Panthers	Win	32-12	13 June	Sydney Football Stadium
Round 15	Newcastle Knights	Win	16-14	22 June	Energy Australia Stadium
Round 16	Bulldogs	Win	24-14	27 June	Sydney Football Stadium
Round 17	Bye	-	-		
Round 18	Gold Coast Titans	Loss	28-32	11 July	Sydney Football Stadium
Round 19	Canberra Raiders	Loss	12-34	20 July	Canberra Stadium
Round 20	Manly-Warringah Sea Eagles	Win	34-12	27 July	Sydney Football Stadium
Round 21	North Queensland Cowboys	Win	32-20	2 August	Dairy Farmers Stadium
Round 22	Parramatta Eels	Loss	24-28	10 August	Sydney Football Stadium
Round 23	Melbourne Storm	Loss	6-30	15 August	Olympic Park Stadium
Round 24	Cronulla-Sutherland Sharks	Loss	0-20	22 August	Toyota Stadium
Round 25	South Sydney Rabbitohs	Win	22-20	29 August	ANZ Stadium
Round 26	St. George-Illawarra Dragons	Win	10-0	5 September	Sydney Football Stadium
Finals Week 1	Brisbane Broncos	Loss	16-24	12 September	Sydney Football Stadium
Finals Week 2	New Zealand Warriors	Loss	13-30	19 September	Mt Smart Stadium

== Player Summary ==
Sydney Roosters 2008	Appearance	Interchange	Tries	Goals	F/G	Points
Braith Anasta	25	-	11	5	1	55
James Aubusson	6	17	1	-	-	4
Mitchell Aubusson	19	3	9	-	-	36
Riley Brown	21	-	-	-	-	0
Anthony Cherrington	5	9	-	-	-	0
Craig Fitzgibbon	21	-	3	62	-	136
Jake Friend	-	5	-	-	-	0
Brent Grose	11	4	3	-	-	12
Ben Jones	-	1	-	-	-	0
Shaun Kenny-Dowall	19	-	15	-	-	60
Willie Mason	18	2	4	-	-	16
Anthony Minichiello	9	-	3	-	-	12
Nate Myles	15	2	1	-	-	4
Frank-Paul Nuuausala	6	5	1	-	-	4
Mark O'Meley	22	2	2	-	-	8
Lopini Paea	10	16	-	-	-	0
Mickey Paea	1	7	-	-	-	0
Mitchell Pearce	25	-	7	-	1	29
Sam Perrett	24	1	5	-	-	20
Amos Roberts	21	-	12	10	-	68
Sean Rudder	-	1	-	-	-	0
Setaimata Sa	16	4	7	-	-	28
Shane Shackleton	-	2	-	-	-	0
David Shillington	9	14	1	-	-	4
Iosia Soliola	20	2	5	-	-	20
Anthony Tupou	15	7	6	-	-	24
Total	338	104	96	77	2	540
