= 2008 St. George Illawarra Dragons season =

- NRL rank: 7th
- 2008 record: Wins: 13; draws: 0; losses: 11
- Points scored: For: 495; against: 416

Team information
- Coach: (Australia) Nathan Brown
- Captain: (Australia) Mark Gasnier
- Stadium: Accor Stadium WIN Stadium

Top scorers
- Tries: Josh Morris (14)
- Goals: Jamie Soward (54)
- Points: Jamie Soward (129)
| ← 2007 | 2009 → |

The 2008 St. George Illawarra Dragons season was the 10th in the joint venture club's history. They competed in the NRL's 2008 Telstra Premiership and finished the regular season 7th out of 16 teams, being knocked out in the finals by eventual premiers, the Manly-Warringah Sea Eagles.

== NRL Telstra Premiership ==
Having failed to bring the club a premiership during his current tenure with the Dragons and coming off contract at the end of the year, Coach Nathan Brown has had heat on him from 2007 to bring the Dragons up and away from the bottom of the ladder. Since the start of the 2008 season, the Dragons have had, once again, loss after loss which has caused Peter Doust (Dragons CEO), to bring in a new coach in the case of Brisbane Broncos current coach Wayne Bennett for the 2009 season up until 2011. The Dragons started the 2008 season by winning the Mercury Challenge match against the Bulldogs 40–30 at WIN Stadium in Wollongong and winning their first Toyota Cup trial match against Bulldogs at 30–22. The following week the Dragons went down to the South Sydney Rabbitohs in the annual Charity Shield clash 24–20 at ANZ Stadium.

The club received a boost in May when former Union and League (Brisbane Broncos) star Wendell Sailor joined the team after a 2-year ban from professional sport in Australia due to his cocaine controversy. The Dragons started another year with disappointing results when they only won three times after 10 rounds, defeating the Gold Coast Titans in Round 2, the Sydney Roosters in Round 7 and the Melbourne Storm in Round 10 all with terrific results. On 23 May, the Dragons recorded their first back-to-back wins of the season when they defeated the Manly-Warringah Sea Eagles at Brookvale Oval with a final score of 20–18.

The Dragons new winger Wendell Sailor made his NRL return in this match also sustaining a minor cheekbone injury. The club also signed South Sydney Rabbitohs player Ben Rogers from an immediate release to join the Dragons on 12 June but released Jason Ryles from his contract to join the Catalans Dragons in the Super League for 2009. Days later they signed New Zealand international and Melbourne Storm player Jeremy Smith for three seasons.

Their 7-game winning streak came to an end in Round 18 when they were defeated by the Canberra Raiders 19–12 at WIN Stadium for the Illawarra Heritage Match. On 15 July, it was announced that captain Mark Gasnier would not be returning after the end of the 2008 season to join the Stade Français Rugby Union team in France. The deal is worth around $1 million a year.

After 1 win in their last 5 games, the Dragons defeated the Brisbane Broncos at Suncorp Stadium with a 24–20 win. Then in Round 24, they defeated the New Zealand Warriors 34–6 at WIN Stadium, Wollongong to keep their finals hopes alive. The dragons were favoured to defeat the Roosters in round 26 to either finish fourth or fifth. They had been playing widespread open football and Mark Gasnier and Matt Cooper were carving up the opposition. In extremely wet conditions, the Roosters pack were more favoured to the conditions. They finished the regular season 7th place on the ladder which could have been 6th if they scored at least 2 points in their Round 26 match with the Sydney Roosters. They made it to the first week of the finals, but lost to the Manly-Warringah Sea Eagles 34–6 at Brookvale Oval being eliminated from the Finals series due to their lowly position in the Top 8.

The club went on a 'signing spree' purchasing Neville Costigan, Darius Boyd and Luke Priddis among others, but lost flyer Josh Morris (Bulldogs), Mark Gasnier (French Rugby), Jason Ryles (French league), Rangi Chase (ESL), Lagi Setu (Broncos) and Simon Woolford & Kirk Reynoldson with retirement.

| Position | Pld | Won | Drew | Lost | Bye | Points For | Points Against | Points Differential |
|---|---|---|---|---|---|---|---|---|
| 7th (of 16) | 24 | 13 | 0 | 11 | 2 | 489 | 378 | 111 |

=== 2008 Match results ===
*From Round 5 onwards, all games are in AEST.

| Round | Home | Score | Away | Match Information |
| Round | Home | Score | Away | Date and Time | Venue |
|---|---|---|---|---|---|
| Trial | St. George Illawarra Dragons | 40-30 | Bulldogs | 23 February 2008, 7:30pm AEDT | WIN Stadium |
| CS | St. George Illawarra Dragons | 20-24 | South Sydney Rabbitohs | 1 March 2008, 8:00pm AEDT | ANZ Stadium |
| 1 | Wests Tigers | 24-16 | St. George Illawarra Dragons | 16 March 2008, 3:00pm AEDT | Sydney Football Stadium |
| 2 | St. George Illawarra Dragons | 30-12 | Gold Coast Titans | 24 March 2008, 7:00pm AEDT | WIN Stadium |
| 3 | Canberra Raiders | 21-14 | St. George Illawarra Dragons | 29 March 2008, 7:30pm AEDT | Canberra Stadium |
| 4 | St. George Illawarra Dragons | 16-18 | Cronulla Sharks | 5 April 2008, 5:30pm AEDT | ANZ Stadium |
| 5 | St. George Illawarra Dragons | 16-20 | North Queensland Cowboys | 12 April 2008, 5:30pm | WIN Stadium |
| 6 | Bulldogs | 30-18 | St. George Illawarra Dragons | 19 April 2008, 5:30pm | ANZ Stadium |
| 7 | St. George Illawarra Dragons | 26-6 | Sydney Roosters | 25 April 2008, 3:15pm | ANZ Stadium |
| 8 | | BYE |
| 9 | Parramatta Eels | 19-18 | St. George Illawarra Dragons | 11 May 2008, 3:00pm | ANZ Stadium |
| 10 | St. George Illawarra Dragons | 36-12 | Melbourne Storm | 17 May 2008, 7:30pm | ANZ Stadium |
| 11 | Manly-Warringah Sea Eagles | 18-20 | St. George Illawarra Dragons | 23 May 2008, 7:45pm | Brookvale Oval |
| 12 | South Sydney Rabbitohs | 12-26 | St. George Illawarra Dragons | 1 June 2008, 2:00pm | ANZ Stadium |
| 13 | St. George Illawarra Dragons | 28-10 | Brisbane Broncos | 6 June 2008, 7:45pm | WIN Stadium |
| 14 | | BYE |
| 15 | St. George Illawarra Dragons | 13-12 | Penrith Panthers | 20 June 2008, 7:45pm | ANZ Stadium |
| 16 | Gold Coast Titans | 22-26 | St. George Illawarra Dragons | 28 June 2008, 5:30pm | Skilled Park |
| 17 | Newcastle Knights | 16-24 | St. George Illawarra Dragons | 5 July 2008, 7:30pm | EnergyAustralia Stadium |
| 18 | St. George Illawarra Dragons | 12-19 | Canberra Raiders | 13 July 2008, 2:00pm | WIN Stadium |
| 19 | Melbourne Storm | 26-0 | St. George Illawarra Dragons | 21 July 2008, 7:00pm | Olympic Park Stadium |
| 20 | St. George Illawarra Dragons | 30-0 | Bulldogs | 28 July 2008, 7:00pm | ANZ Stadium |
| 21 | Cronulla Sharks | 13-12 | St. George Illawarra Dragons | 2 August 2008, 5:30pm | Toyota Park |
| 22 | St. George Illawarra Dragons | 10-18 | Wests Tigers | 8 August 2008, 7:35pm | WIN Stadium |
| 23 | Brisbane Broncos | 20-24 | St. George Illawarra Dragons | 15 August 2008, 7:35pm | Suncorp Stadium |
| 24 | St. George Illawarra Dragons | 34-6 | New Zealand Warriors | 24 August 2008, 3:00pm | WIN Stadium |
| 25 | St. George Illawarra Dragons | 40-14 | Parramatta Eels | 30 September 2008, 7:30pm | ANZ Stadium |
| 26 | Sydney Roosters | 10-0 | St. George Illawarra Dragons | 5 September 2008, 7:35pm | Sydney Football Stadium |
| QF | Manly-Warringah Sea Eagles | 38-6 | St. George Illawarra Dragons | 13 September 2008, 8:30pm | Brookvale Oval |

=== Ladder ===
2008 NRL season
| Pos | Team | Pld | W | D | L | B | PF | PA | PD | Pts |
|---|---|---|---|---|---|---|---|---|---|---|
| 1 | Melbourne Storm | 24 | 17 | 0 | 7 | 2 | 584 | 282 | +302 | 38 |
| 2 | Manly Warringah Sea Eagles (P) | 24 | 17 | 0 | 7 | 2 | 645 | 355 | +290 | 38 |
| 3 | Cronulla-Sutherland Sharks | 24 | 17 | 0 | 7 | 2 | 451 | 384 | +67 | 38 |
| 4 | Sydney Roosters | 24 | 15 | 0 | 9 | 2 | 511 | 446 | +65 | 34 |
| 5 | Brisbane Broncos | 24 | 14 | 1 | 9 | 2 | 560 | 452 | +108 | 33 |
| 6 | Canberra Raiders | 24 | 13 | 0 | 11 | 2 | 640 | 527 | +113 | 30 |
| 7 | St George Illawarra Dragons | 24 | 13 | 0 | 11 | 2 | 489 | 378 | +111 | 30 |
| 8 | New Zealand Warriors | 24 | 13 | 0 | 11 | 2 | 502 | 567 | -65 | 30 |
| 9 | Newcastle Knights | 24 | 12 | 0 | 12 | 2 | 516 | 486 | +30 | 28 |
| 10 | Wests Tigers | 24 | 11 | 0 | 13 | 2 | 528 | 560 | -32 | 26 |
| 11 | Parramatta Eels | 24 | 11 | 0 | 13 | 2 | 501 | 547 | -46 | 26 |
| 12 | Penrith Panthers | 24 | 10 | 1 | 13 | 2 | 504 | 611 | -107 | 25 |
| 13 | Gold Coast Titans | 24 | 10 | 0 | 14 | 2 | 476 | 586 | -110 | 24 |
| 14 | South Sydney Rabbitohs | 24 | 8 | 0 | 16 | 2 | 453 | 666 | -213 | 20 |
| 15 | North Queensland Cowboys | 24 | 5 | 0 | 19 | 2 | 474 | 638 | -164 | 14 |
| 16 | Canterbury-Bankstown Bulldogs | 24 | 5 | 0 | 19 | 2 | 433 | 782 | -349 | 14 |

=== Gains and Losses ===
Gains

| Player | Previous club |
|---|---|
| Kirk Reynoldson | Newcastle Knights |
| Stuart Webb | South Sydney Rabbitohs |
| Ben Rogers (mid-season) | South Sydney Rabbitohs |
| Jon Green | Bulldogs |
| Jarrod Saffy | Wests Tigers |
| Jardine Bobongie | North Sydney Bears |
| Joe Falemaka | North Sydney Bears |

Losses

| Player | Joined Club |
|---|---|
| Wes Naiqama | Newcastle Knights |
| Danny Wicks | Newcastle Knights |
| Chris Houston | Newcastle Knights |
| Keith Lulia | Newcastle Knights |
| Ashton Sims | Brisbane Broncos |
| Tom Hewitt | Brisbane Broncos |
| Corey Payne | Wests Tigers |
| Adam Peek | Cronulla Sharks |
| Charlie Leaeno | Bulldogs |

=== First Grade Signed Players ===
St George Illawarra Dragons has 31 signed players in first grade that play in the main competition.

No.

Position
Player

Jardine Bobongie – LK Rangi Chase – SR Matt Cooper – CE Ben Creagh – SR Ben Ellis – HK Joe Falemaka – PR Mark Gasnier (captain) – CE Jon Green – PR Mark Hendy – CE Ben Hornby – HB Dan Hunt – PR Michael Lett – WG Brett Morris – FB Josh Morris – WG Jason Nightingale – WG Justin Poore – PR

No.

Position
Player

Matt Prior – SR Alex Ranieri – HK Kirk Reynoldson – SR Jason Ryles – PR Jarrod Saffy – SR Frank Samia – CE Wendell Sailor – WG Beau Scott – SR Lagi Setu – LK Jamie Soward – FE Chase Stanley – CE Ricky Thorby – PR Stuart Webb – LK Simon Woolford – HK Dean Young – HK

=== Team Lineup ===
Line up for the Qualifying Finals vs. Manly-Warringah Sea Eagles:
Saturday, 13 September 2008 at 8:30pm AEST at Brookvale Oval, Sydney.

No.

Position
Player

1 Jason Nightingale – FB 2 Wendell Sailor – WG 3 Mark Gasnier – CE (captain) 4 Matt Cooper – CE 5 Josh Morris – WG 6 Ben Rogers – FE 7 Ben Hornby – HB 8 Beau Scott – PR 9 Stuart Webb – HK 10 Jason Ryles – PR 11 Lagi Setu – SR 12 Ben Creagh – SR 13 Dean Young – LK

No.

Position
Player

14 Dan Hunt – PR 15 Matt Prior – PR 16 Kirk Reynoldson – SR 17 Ben Ellis – HK Jarrod Saffy – SR Jamie Soward – FE Simon Woolford – HK Rangi Chase – LK Michael Lett – CE Brett Morris – FB Chase Stanley (injured ankle; Semi-finals) – CE Justin Poore (injured knee; Season) – PR Ricky Thorby (injured ribs; Season) – PR

- Last 9 are currently inactive due to injury, fulfilling other commitments, being used as "spares" or playing in lower grades. e.g. NSW Cup, Queensland Cup or Toyota Cup.

== National Youth Competition (Toyota Cup Under 20s) ==
The Dragons U20s side were strong off from the start. For the Toyota Cup inaugural season, the Dragons Under-20s Side is coached by Steven Price. Before the regular season began, the Dragons won a Toyota Cup Trial match against the Bulldogs down at WIN Stadium in Wollongong. They started the regular season disappointing with a 34–22 loss to the Wests Tigers. However, the Dragons have not lost another match after that with 1 bye in their past leaving them on top of the Toyota Cup table, on 22 competition points. Their 10-match winning streak came to an end in Round 13 at WIN Stadium when they drew 22 all with the Brisbane Broncos. While the first Grade side continued their winning streak, the Under 20s were looking to start a losing streak as they were defeated back-to-back for the first time this year by the Penrith Panthers 28–26 in Round 15 at ANZ Stadium and 32-16 by the Gold Coast Titans at Skilled Park on the Gold Coast. They returned to the winners circle in Round 17 defeating the Newcastle Knights 26–18 at EnergyAustralia Stadium. In Round 18, straight after a fresh win, they once again lost a match this time against the Canberra Raiders 38–28 at WIN Stadium. They then had back and forth wins during the regular season keeping them in the top 8, struggling to keep their spot(s).

=== Toyota Cup signed players ===
The following 34 players are signed with the St. George Illawarra Dragons for the Toyota Cup.

No.

Position
Player

Chris Astill – WG Jace Brown – WG Rowan Brown – LK Josh Cochrane – PR Rhys Cochrane – PR Nathan Dureau – FE Daniel Fepuleai – HK Thomas Hancock – PR Beau Henry – FE Gavin Hood – HB Brad Hudson – SR Ben Josephs – SR John Kennedy (captain) – HB Maurice Kennedy – FE Cameron King – CE Kane Linnett – CE Jake Marketo – SR

No.

Position
Player

Trent Merrin – PR Sam Morath – FB Clifford Morris – WG Matt Mundine – LK Luke Muttdon – LK Daniel Nicastri – CE Rory O'Brien – PR Michael Pickerd – LK Henry Raiwalui – WG Travis Roche – PR Ben Schreiber – SR Brendan Smith – LK Kyle Stanley – LK Wes Suckley – LK Jarrod Thompson – SR Joe Vickory – WG Dean Whare – CE

=== Toyota Cup lineup ===
This is the Dragons' Toyota Cup weekly lineup.
Lineup for the Preliminary Finals vs. Canberra Raiders:
Friday, 26 September 2008 at 5:30 pm AEST at the Sydney Football Stadium, Sydney.

No.

Position
Player

1 Henry Raiwalui – FB 2 Daniel Nicastri – WG 3 Kane Linnett – CE 4 Dean Whare – CE 5 Sam Morath – WG 6 Nathan Dureau – FE 7 John Kennedy – HB (captain) 8 Rory O'Brien – PR 9 Daniel Fepuleai – HK 10 Trent Merrin – PR 11 Jake Marketo – SR 12 Jarrod Thompson – SR 13 Clifford Morris – LK

No.

Position
Player

14 Thomas Hancock – HK 15 Wes Suckley – SR 16 Luke Muttdon – SR 17 Cameron King – PR (18) Ben Schreiber – HK Beau Henry – PR Maurice Kennedy – FE Brad Hudson – SR Alex McKinnon – LK Matt Mundine – LK Travis Roche – WG Jace Brown – WG Joe Vickery – WG

- 1 Interchange player to be omitted before game.
- Last 6 are currently inactive due to injury, fulfilling other commitments, being used as "spares" or playing in the NSW Cup or the S.G. Ball Cup.

=== Ladder ===
2008 Toyota Cup season
| Pos | Team | Pld | W | D | L | B | PF | PA | PD | Pts |
|---|---|---|---|---|---|---|---|---|---|---|
| 1 | Canberra Raiders (P) | 24 | 18 | 0 | 6 | 2 | 744 | 581 | +163 | 40 |
| 2 | Brisbane Broncos | 24 | 15 | 1 | 8 | 2 | 684 | 476 | +208 | 35 |
| 3 | New Zealand Warriors | 24 | 14 | 3 | 7 | 2 | 721 | 533 | +188 | 35 |
| 4 | Penrith Panthers | 24 | 15 | 1 | 8 | 2 | 692 | 583 | +109 | 35 |
| 5 | Parramatta Eels | 24 | 14 | 3 | 7 | 2 | 578 | 564 | +14 | 35 |
| 6 | St George Illawarra Dragons | 24 | 13 | 2 | 9 | 2 | 561 | 520 | +41 | 32 |
| 7 | Canterbury-Bankstown Bulldogs | 24 | 12 | 3 | 9 | 2 | 711 | 587 | +124 | 31 |
| 8 | Gold Coast Titans | 24 | 13 | 1 | 10 | 2 | 686 | 567 | +119 | 31 |
| 9 | Wests Tigers | 24 | 13 | 0 | 11 | 2 | 620 | 623 | -3 | 30 |
| 10 | South Sydney Rabbitohs | 24 | 11 | 2 | 11 | 2 | 618 | 584 | +34 | 28 |
| 11 | Manly Warringah Sea Eagles | 24 | 11 | 0 | 13 | 2 | 519 | 532 | -13 | 26 |
| 12 | Newcastle Knights | 24 | 8 | 1 | 15 | 2 | 526 | 630 | -104 | 21 |
| 13 | Melbourne Storm | 24 | 8 | 1 | 15 | 2 | 512 | 638 | -126 | 21 |
| 14 | Cronulla-Sutherland Sharks | 24 | 6 | 1 | 17 | 2 | 394 | 666 | -272 | 17 |
| 15 | Sydney Roosters | 24 | 6 | 0 | 18 | 2 | 480 | 721 | -241 | 16 |
| 16 | North Queensland Cowboys | 24 | 4 | 3 | 17 | 2 | 455 | 696 | -241 | 15 |
