= Ben Jones (Australian rugby league, born 1980) =

Australian rugby league footballer

Personal information
- Born: 15 April 1980 (age 45) Redcliffe, Queensland, Australia
- Height: 185 cm (6 ft 1 in)
- Weight: 97 kg (15 st 4 lb)

Playing information
- Position: Second-row
Club
| Years | Team | Pld | T | G | FG | P |
|---|---|---|---|---|---|---|
| 2006–08 | Canberra Raiders | 33 | 2 | 0 | 0 | 8 |
- As of 12:14, 16 September 2008 (UTC)

Ben Jones (born 15 April 1980 in Redcliffe, Queensland) is an Australian former professional rugby league footballer who played for the Canberra Raiders in the National Rugby League. He played in the second-row.

He retired at the conclusion of the 2008 season, citing knee injuries as the reason for his retirement.
