= List of teams in the NSWRL/ARL/SL/NRL =

This is a complete list of clubs that have competed in Australia's first-grade rugby league football competition, which began with the establishment of the New South Wales Rugby Football League (NSWRFL) in 1908.

== Background ==
The NSWRFL (which became the New South Wales Rugby League, or NSWRL, in the 1980s) administered the competition until the end of the 1994 season. In 1995, governance shifted to the newly formed Australian Rugby League (ARL).

In 1997, a rival competition, the Super League, backed by News Limited, operated for a single season, running concurrently with the ARL's premiership. The following year, the two competitions merged to form the National Rugby League (NRL), established as a joint venture between the ARL and News Limited. In 2013, the ARL was restructured into the Australian Rugby League Commission (ARLC), which assumed full ownership of the NRL following News Limited's withdrawal.

Since 1908, a total of 33 clubs have competed in Australia's first-grade premiership, with 17 clubs active in the current competition. The league's early decades were limited to Sydney-based teams. Of the original nine foundation clubs, two remain in the NRL today. Over the next 80 years, expansion was confined to the Sydney region, which added eight more clubs while five ceased participation. The league began to expand geographically in 1982, with the inclusion of teams from Wollongong and Canberra. In 1988, clubs from outside New South Wales, including Queensland, entered the competition.

During the 1997 season, 22 teams competed across the rival ARL and Super League competitions. Following reunification, a restructuring plan was implemented, and by the 2000 season, the competition was reduced to 14 teams.

== Foundation clubs ==
Two current NRL clubs have existed continuously since the NSWRFL's inaugural 1908 season: the South Sydney Rabbitohs and the Sydney Roosters, originally known as Eastern Suburbs. South Sydney is the oldest club, founded in early 1908, while the Roosters hold the distinction of being the only club to have participated in every season since 1908 without interruption; Souths were briefly excluded from the competition in the early 2000s.

Two additional foundation clubs, the Balmain Tigers and Western Suburbs Magpies, merged to form the Wests Tigers ahead of the 2000 NRL season. Both Balmain and Western Suburbs continue to operate in lower-tier competitions and junior development.

Other foundation clubs include:

- Newtown and North Sydney, both excluded from the top-tier due to financial difficulties, but continuing in the NSW Cup and junior pathways as of 2015.
- Glebe, currently competing in the third-tier Ron Massey Cup.
- Cumberland, which disbanded after the 1908 season.
- Newcastle Rebels, who competed in 1908–1909 before withdrawing to establish the local Newcastle Rugby League. There is no direct lineage between the Rebels and the modern Newcastle Knights, who are therefore not considered a foundation club.

== Clubs ==
| Team | Based | Admission date | Seasons participated | P | R | M | W | W% | Wins | Draws | Losses |
|---|---|---|---|---|---|---|---|---|---|---|---|
| Glebe Dirty Reds | Sydney | 9 January 1908 | 1908–1929 (22 seasons) | 0 | 4 | 1 | 0 | 56% | 163 | 6 | 128 |
| Newtown Bluebags / Jets | Sydney | 14 January 1908 | 1908–1983 (76 seasons) | 3 | 7 | 6 | 8 | 47% | 583 | 59 | 663 |
| **South Sydney Rabbitohs** | Sydney | 17 January 1908 | 1908–1999, 2002–2026 (117 seasons) | 21 | 13 | 17 | 8 | 53% | 1013 | 46 | 917 |
| Balmain Tigers^ | Sydney | 23 January 1908 | 1908–1999 (92 seasons) | 11 | 9 | 7 | 4 | 53% | 871 | 68 | 766 |
| **Eastern Suburbs / Sydney City / Sydney Roosters** | Sydney | 24 January 1908 | 1908–2026 (119 seasons) | 15 | 15 | 16 | 4 | 54% | 1064 | 68 | 912 |
| Western Suburbs Magpies^ | Sydney | 4 February 1908 | 1908–1999 (92 seasons) | 4 | 8 | 5 | 17 | 45% | 734 | 49 | 908 |
| North Sydney Bears^^ | Sydney | 7 February 1908 | 1908–1999 (92 seasons) | 2 | 1 | 2 | 9 | 43% | 678 | 71 | 916 |
| Newcastle Rebels | Newcastle | 10 April 1908 | 1908–1909 (2 seasons) | 0 | 0 | 0 | 0 | 45% | 9 | 0 | 11 |
| Cumberland | Sydney | 21 April 1908 | 1908 (1 season) | 0 | 0 | 0 | 1 | 13% | 1 | 0 | 7 |
| Annandale Dales | Sydney | 10 April 1910 | 1910–1920 (11 seasons) | 0 | 0 | 0 | 3 | 18% | 25 | 6 | 122 |
| University | Sydney | February 1920 | 1920–1937 (18 seasons) | 0 | 1 | 0 | 10 | 20% | 47 | 5 | 190 |
| St. George Dragons^ | Sydney | 13 October 1920 | 1921–1998 (78 seasons) | 15 | 12 | 15 | 3 | 61% | 910 | 56 | 579 |
| **Canterbury-Bankstown Berries / Bulldogs** | Sydney | 25 September 1934 | 1935–2026 (92 seasons) | 8 | 10 | 6 | 4 | 54% | 866 | 53 | 751 |
| **Parramatta Eels** | Sydney | 4 November 1946 | 1947–2026 (80 seasons) | 4 | 5 | 5 | 11 | 48% | | | |
| **Manly-Warringah Sea Eagles**^^ | Sydney | 4 November 1946 | 1947–1999, 2003–2026 (77 seasons) | 8 | 10 | 9 | 0 | 59% | | | |
| **Cronulla-Sutherland Sharks** | Sydney | 4 July 1966 | 1967–2026 (60 seasons) | 1 | 3 | 1 | 2 | 50% | | | |
| **Penrith Panthers** | Sydney | 4 July 1966 | 1967–2026 (60 seasons) | 4 | 1 | 2 | 4 | 42% | | | |
| Illawarra Steelers^ | Wollongong | 13 December 1980 | 1982–1998 (17 seasons) | 0 | 0 | 0 | 3 | 40% | | | |
| **Canberra Raiders** | Canberra | 30 March 1981 | 1982–2026 (45 seasons) | 3 | 3 | 1 | 1 | 54% | | | |
| **Brisbane Broncos** | Brisbane | 5 April 1987 | 1988–2026 (39 seasons) | 6 | 1 | 4 | 1 | 65% | | | |
| **Newcastle Knights** | Newcastle | 5 April 1987 | 1988–2026 (39 seasons) | 2 | 0 | 0 | 3 | 53% | | | |
| Gold Coast-Tweed Giants / Gold Coast Seagulls / Gold Coast Chargers | Gold Coast / Tweed Heads | April 1987 | 1988–1998 (11 seasons) | 0 | 0 | 0 | 3 | 23% | | | |
| **Auckland Warriors / New Zealand Warriors** | Auckland | 18 May 1992 | 1995–2026 (32 seasons) | 0 | 2 | 1 | 0 | 47% | | | |
| **North Queensland Cowboys** | Townsville | 30 November 1992 | 1995–2026 (32 seasons) | 1 | 1 | 0 | 3 | 37% | | | |
| Western Reds / Perth Reds | Perth | 30 November 1992 | 1995–1997 (3 seasons) | 0 | 0 | 0 | 0 | 40% | | | |
| South Queensland Crushers | Brisbane | 30 November 1992 | 1995–1997 (3 seasons) | 0 | 0 | 0 | 2 | 21% | | | |
| Hunter Mariners | Newcastle | 28 April 1995 | 1997 (1 season) | 0 | 0 | 0 | 0 | 39% | | | |
| Adelaide Rams | Adelaide | 13 December 1995 | 1997–1998 (2 seasons) | 0 | 0 | 0 | 0 | 32% | | | |
| **Melbourne Storm** | Melbourne | 23 June 1997 | 1998–2026 (29 seasons) | 4 | 4 | 5 | 1 | 61% | | | |
| **St. George Illawarra Dragons**^ | Sydney, Wollongong | 23 September 1998 | 1999–2026 (28 seasons) | 1 | 1 | 2 | 0 | 52% | | | |
| **Wests Tigers**^ | Sydney | 27 July 1999 | 2000–2026 (27 seasons) | 1 | 0 | 0 | 0 | 43% | | | |
| Northern Eagles^^ | Sydney, Gosford | 6 February 2000 | 2000–2002 (3 seasons) | 0 | 0 | 0 | 0 | 40% | | | |
| **Gold Coast Titans** | Gold Coast | 27 May 2005 | 2007–2026 (20 seasons) | 0 | 0 | 0 | 2 | 44% | | | |
| **Dolphins** | Brisbane | 13 October 2021 | 2023– (1 season) | 0 | 0 | 0 | 0 | 0% | | | |

- **Bold** indicates the team is still competing as of the 2023 season
- ^ Now compete as a joint venture
- ^^ Have competed as a joint venture

== Statistics ==
As of 2026, the NRL features 17 clubs, distributed as follows:

- 10 from New South Wales
- 4 from Queensland
- 1 from the Australian Capital Territory
- 1 from Victoria
- 1 from New Zealand

Of the 33 clubs that have participated in the top-tier competition:

- 17 have been based exclusively in Sydney
- 2 have operated as joint ventures with a presence in Sydney
- 23 have been based in New South Wales
- 5 in Queensland
- 1 each in Victoria, South Australia, Western Australia, the Australian Capital Territory and New Zealand
