= Matt Orford =

Australian rugby league footballer

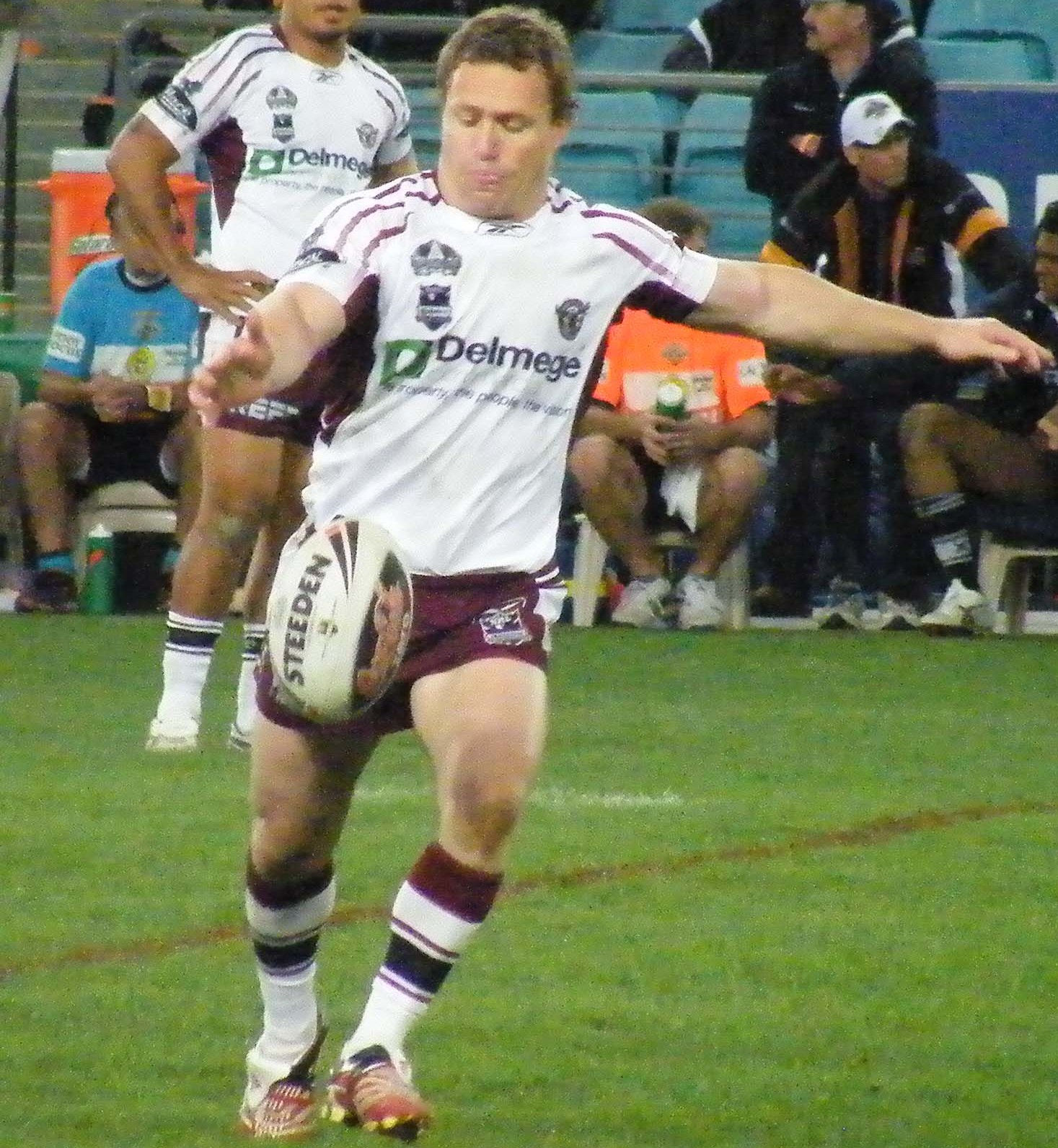

Personal information
- Full name: Matthew Orford
- Born: 22 April 1978 (age 48) Gosford, New South Wales, Australia

Playing information
- Height: 169 cm (5 ft 7 in)
- Weight: 92 kg (14 st 7 lb)
- Position: Halfback
Club
Years	Team	Pld	T	G	FG	P
2000	Northern Eagles	11	4	23	0	62
2001–05	Melbourne Storm	120	52	333	3	877
2006–09	Manly Sea Eagles	98	17	242	9	561
2010	Bradford Bulls	14	3	31	2	76
2011	Canberra Raiders	6	0	0	0	0
	Total	249	76	629	14	1576
Representative
Years	Team	Pld	T	G	FG	P
2001–06	NSW City	3	0	0	0	0

Matthew Orford (born 22 April 1978), also known by the nickname of "The Ox", is an Australian former professional rugby league footballer who played in the 2000s and 2010s. He played for the Gosford Townies as a junior. A City New South Wales representative halfback, he played the majority of his club football career in Australia for National Rugby League clubs Melbourne Storm and Manly-Warringah Sea Eagles, representing the latter when he won 2008's Dally M Medal and NRL premiership. Orford also played for NRL sides Northern Eagles and Canberra Raiders, as well as in Super League for England's Bradford Bulls.

== Playing career ==
Orford was a North Sydney Bears junior and started his career with the Northern Eagles before joining the Melbourne Storm. In 2004, he was named the Storm's player of the year.

He joined the Manly-Warringah Sea Eagles for the 2006 NRL season. He was later appointed captain of the club. Orford was a member of the Manly-Warringah team which lost the 2007 NRL grand final to the Melbourne Storm. Orford captained the Manly-Warringah club in the 2008 NRL Grand Final victory over the Melbourne Storm.

In September 2008, Orford won the prestigious Dally M Medal for being voted the best and fairest player of the 2008 NRL season. He finished on 24 points, two points ahead of Billy Slater. Orford was the first player since Peter Sterling to win the Dally M Medal and the premiership in the same year.

He signed for the Bradford Bulls on a three-year deal, starting in the 2010 season. However, his first season with the struggling Yorkshire club did not go well and was brought to an early finish due to Orford suffering a shoulder injury that would require surgery. He gained a release from the Bradford club in order to return home to Australia.

Orford's release was officially granted on 10 January 2011, and he signed with the Canberra Raiders on the same day. Affected by a groin injury, Orford played six matches for Canberra in the 2011 NRL season. At the end of the season, he was released from the remainder of his contract.

== Post-playing ==
On 14 August 2016, Orford underwent emergency surgery to remove a blood clot from his brain.

In 2023, he was appointed as Manly's Under 16s Development Coach.
