= 2008 Newcastle Knights season =

← 2007	2009 →

In 2008 the Newcastle Knights took part in the 100th year of the Telstra Premiership, finishing the season 9th.

== Results ==
Season 2007 – Draw and Results
Round	Date	Opponents	Venue	Result	Scorers	Crowd
1	Saturday, 15 March	Raiders	EnergyAustralia Stadium	Win	Knights(30): Danny Buderus, Kurt Gidley, Wes Naiqama, Cooper Vuna, Danny Wicks tries; Kurt Gidley (5/6) goals; Raiders(14): Adrian Purtell(2), Lincoln Withers tries; Todd Carney (1/3) goals.	17,223
2	Saturday, 22 March	Manly	Energy Australia Stadium	Win	Knights(13): Richie Fa'aoso, Chris Houston tries; Kurt Gidley (2/3) goals Scott DureauField Goals;Manly(12): Michael Bani, Jamie Lyon; Matt Orford(2/2) Goals	18,117
3	Friday, 28 March	Eels	Parramatta Stadium	Loss	Eels(24):Jarryd Hayne(2), Brett Finch, Eric Grothe Tries; Luke Burt (3/4) Goals, Luke Burt, Nathan Cayless Field Goals; Knights(23): Keith Lulia (2), Wes Naiqama, Cooper Vuna tries; Kurt Gidley (3/4) goals.	15,176
4	Sunday, 6 April	Warriors	Mt Smart Stadium	Loss	Warriors (26): Ryan Shortland(2), Patrick Ah Van, Evarn Tuimavave Tries; Michael Witt (5/6) Goals. Knights(20): Wes Naiqama(2), James McManus, Corey Paterson Tries, Kurt Gidley (2/4) goals.	11,518
5	Sunday, 13 April	Broncos	Energy Australia Stadium	Loss	Knights(22): Kurt Gidey (2), Corey Paterson (2), Chris Houston Tries; Kurt Gidley (1/5) goals. Broncos(34): Michael Ennis(2), Justin Hodges(2), Karmichael Hunt tries, Michael Ennis (7/7) goals,.	21,614
6	Sunday 22 April	Rosters	Energy Australia Stadium	Loss	Knights(34): Chris Bailey(2), Cory Paterson, Jesse Royal, Cooper Vuna, Danny Wicks tries, Kurt Gidley (5/6) Goals. Roosters(20): Craig Fitzgibbon, Shaun Kenny-Dowall, Amos Roberts, Iosia Soliola, Tries Craig Fitzgibbon (2/4) goals.	14,176
7	Friday – Sunday, 25–27 April				Knights Bye.	
8	Saturday 3 May	Titans	Energy Australia Stadium	Win	Knights(13): Wes Naiqama, Jarod Mullen Tries, Kurt Gidley (2/2) Goals, Scott Dureau Field Goal. Titans (12): Scott Prince, Mark Minichello Tries, Scott Prince (2/2) Goals.	21,280
9	Saturday, 12 May	Storm	Olympic Park	Loss	Storm (18): Israle Folau(2), Anthony Quinn tries; Cameron Smith (3/3) goals; Knights(4): Jarrod Mullen tries; Kurt Gidley (0/1) goals.	10,624
10	Sunday, 18 May	Tigers	Energy Australia Stadium	Loss	Knights(26):Chris Bailey(3), Scott Dureau, Cooper Vuna tries; Wes Naiqama (3/5) goals; Tigers(38)Brett Hodgson(2), Benji Marshall(2), Liam Fulton, Shannon McDonnell, Ben Te'o tries; Benji Marshall (5/7)	-20,154
11	Sun, 27 May; 2pm	Broncos	Suncorp Stadium	Loss	Broncos(71): Tonie Carroll(2), Brent Tate(2), Justin Hodges(2), Joel Moon, Greg Eastwood, Ben Hannant, Petero Civoniceva, Darius Boyd, Karmichael Hunt tries, Corey Parker (4/5), Michael Ennis (4/4), Darren Lockyer (3/3), Darren Lockyer field goal. Knights(6): Jarrod Mullen try, Cory Paterson (1/1) goal.	27,433
12	Sat, 2 June; 5:30pm	Roosters	Bluetongue Stadium	Win	Roosters(18): Mitchell Pierce, Braith Anasta, Anthony Minichiello tries, Craig Fitzgibbon (3/4) goals. Knights(22): Brad Tighe, James McManus, Nathan Hinton, Cory Paterson tries, Cory Paterson (3/4) goals.	11,263
13	Sun, 10 June; 3pm	Tigers	Energy Australia Stadium	Loss	Knights(14): Brad Tighe(2), Cory Paterson tries, Cory Paterson (1/3). Tigers(33): Liam Fulton, Chris Heighington, Taniela Tuiaki, Dean Collis, Robbie Farah tries, Dean Collis (6/6) goals, Robbie Farah field goal.	13,609
14	Mon, 18 Jun; 7pm	Raiders	Energy Australia Stadium	Win	Knights(22): Adam MacDougall(2), Chris Bailey, Brad Tighe tries, Kurt Gidley (3/5) goals. Raiders(18): Brad Cross, Lincoln Withers, Colin Best tries, Michael Dobson (3/3) goals.	11,349
15	Sat, 23 June; 7:30pm	Titans	Carrara Stadium	Loss	Titans(28): Matthew Peterson(3), Brett Delaney, Mat Rogers tries, Mat Rogers (4/5) goals. Knights(22): Daniel Tolar, Luke Walsh, Adam MacDougall, James McManus tries, Kurt Gidley (3/4) goals.	15,306
16	Fri, 29 June; 7:30pm	Rabbitohs	Energy Australia Stadium	Loss	Knights(25): Adam MacDougall, George Carmont, Cooper Vuna, Cory Paterson, James McManus tries, Cory Paterson (2/5) goals, Luke Walsh field goal. Rabbitohs(28): Roy Asotasi(2), Nigel Vagana, Jeremy Smith, Ben Rogers tries, Reece Simmonds (2/2), Isaac Luke (2/3) goals.	16,320
17	Mon, 9 July; 7pm	Eels	Parramatta Stadium	Win	Eels(10): Krisnan Inu, Feleti Mateo tries, Krisnan Inu (1/1), Mark Riddell (0/1) goals. Knights(34): George Carmont(2), Steve Simpson, Mitchell Sargent, Adam MacDougall, James McManus tries, Kurt Gidley (5/7) goals.	10,363
18	Mon, 16 July; 7pm	Storm	Olympic Park	Loss	Storm(44): Steve Turner(2), Anthony Quinn(2), Billy Slater(2), Ryan Hoffman, Matt King, Clint Newton tries, Cameron Smith (3/6), Steve Turner (1/3) goals. Knights(0)	10,223
19	Sat, 21 July; 7:30pm	Roosters	Energy Australia Stadium	Loss	Knights(17): Cooper Vuna(2), Adam MacDougall tries, Kurt Gidley (2/3) goals, Luke Walsh field goal. Roosters(20): David Shillington, Joel Monaghan, Lopini Paea, Mitchell Aubusson tries, Craig Fitzgibbon (2/4) goals.	15,171
20	Sat, 28 July; 7:30pm	Warriors	Mt Smart Stadium	Loss	Warriors(52): Wade McKinnon(2), Grant Rovelli(2), Jerome Ropati(2), Steve Price, Wairangi Koopu, Manu Vatuvei tries, Michael Witt (8/9) goals. Knights(10): James McManus, Kirk Reynoldson tries, Kurt Gidley (1/2) goals.	11,301
21	Fri, 3 August; 7:30pm	Dragons	Energy Australia Stadium	Loss	Knights(4): Kurt Gidley try, Kurt Gidley (0/1) goal. Dragons(20): Jamie Soward(2), Dan Hunt, Chase Stanley tries, Jamie Soward (2/4) goals.	12,573
22	Fri, 10 August; 7:30pm	Sea Eagles	Bluetongue Stadium	Loss	Sea Eagles(50): Brett Stewart(2), Jamie Lyon(2), Jack Afamasaga, Glenn Stewart, Steve Menzies, Matt Orford, Adam Cuthbertson tries, Matt Orford (2/4), Jamie Lyon (4/4), Steve Menzies (1/1) goals. Knights(16): Brad Tighe, Steve Simpson, James McManus tries, Scott Dureau (2/3) goals.	17,122
23	Sun, 19 August; 3pm	Panthers	Energy Australia Stadium	Loss	Penrith(46): Frank Pritchard(3), Michael Jennings(3), Michael Gordon tries, Michael Gordon (9/9) goals. Knights(12): 2 tries, Kurt Gidley (2/2) goals.	14,351
24	Fri, 24 August; 7:30pm	Cowboys	Energy Australia Stadium	Loss	Cowboys(34): Ashley Graham(2), Johnathan Thurston, Matthew Bowen, Ty Williams, Neil Sweeney tries, Thurston (5/6) goals. Knights(18): Cooper Vuna, Chris Bailey, Cory Paterson tries, Kurt Gidley (3/3) goals.	12,264
25	Fri, 31 August; 7:30pm	Tigers	Energy Australia Stadium	Win	Tigers(24): Benji Marshall(2), Chris Lawrence, John Morris tries, Marshall (4/5) goals. Knights(26): Cooper Vuna(2), Cory Paterson, Kurt Gidley tries, Kurt Gidley (5/5) goals.	13,446
