= 2008 Melbourne Storm season =

- NRL Rank: 1st
- Play-off result: Grand Finalists
- 2008 record: Wins: 17; draws: 0; losses: 7
- Points scored: For: 584; against: 282

Team information
- CEO: Brian Waldron
- Coach: Craig Bellamy
- Captain: Cameron Smith (23 Games) Cooper Cronk (5 Games)
- Stadium: Olympic Park Stadium
- Avg. attendance: 12,474
- High attendance: 20,084 (Round 1)

Top scorers
- Tries: Greg Inglis (17)
- Goals: Cameron Smith (77)
- Points: Cameron Smith (170)
← 2007	List of seasons	2009 →

The 2008 Melbourne Storm season was the 11th in the club's history. They competed in the NRL's 2008 Telstra Premiership and finished the regular season as minor premiers before reaching the grand final in which they were beaten by the Manly-Warringah Sea Eagles 40–0, the largest margin in grand final history. The minor premiership won by the Storm in 2008 was later stripped by the NRL in 2010 when it was revealed the club had been in breach of salary cap rules.

Despite losing seven games, Storm managed to finish in top spot on the NRL ladder for a third successive season. They had to wait until the final game to do it though, defeating South Sydney 42–4. A loss to the Warriors in the Qualifying final meant Storm had to do it the hard way and they did just that, defeating the Broncos and Sharks on the road. That tough road eventually caught up with Melbourne in the decider, which they lost to Manly.

Matt Geyer became the first Storm player to reach 250 games while Billy Slater followed on from Cameron Smith the previous year, earning the Golden boot award as the best player in the world.

== Season summary ==
- World Club Challenge – With club captain Cameron Smith back home to be present at the birth of his first child, Melbourne go down 11–4 to Leeds Rhinos in the 2008 World Club Challenge at a rain-swept Elland Road. Ryan Hoffman scored the only try for Melbourne.
- Round 1 – Billy Slater scores a hat-trick as Melbourne begins their title defence with a 32–18 opening round victory over the New Zealand Warriors at the Telstra Dome. A twice tardy Melbourne are fined $10,000 by the NRL for failing to take the field on time.
- Round 2 – Melbourne prop forward Brett White and Cronulla forward Ben Ross are both sent off. Ross is sent off for striking Cooper Cronk with a late elbow, while White is sent off for punching Ross in the ensuing fight. White is later suspended for four matches. The 17–16 defeat ends the clubs 15-match winning streak at Olympic Park.
- Round 3 – Storm experience successive losses for the first time since 2006 as the Sydney Roosters upset Melbourne 10–6.
- 30 March – 2007 Dally M Rookie of the Year Israel Folau announces he is leaving Melbourne at the end of the 2008 season, signing a four-year deal with Brisbane Broncos reportedly worth $1.6m.
- 18 April – Coach Craig Bellamy signs a new contract extension, keeping him at the club until the end of the 2013 NRL season.
- Round 5 – A man of the match performance from Billy Slater, sees Melbourne defeat Manly 26–4 in the Grand Final rematch at Olympic Park.
- Round 6 – Wearing replica 1998 home jerseys, Melbourne stage a second half comeback to defeat Canberra Raiders 23–16, after trailing 16–4 at halftime. Aiden Tolman makes his NRL debut with Melbourne, becoming the first player in the club's history to graduate from playing in the NRL Under-20s competition, which was in its inaugural season.
- 28 May – Michael Crocker announces he will be leaving the club at the completion of the 2008 season, signing a three-year deal with Super League's Hull F.C.
- Round 10 – Missing nine players to State of Origin selection, as well as coach Craig Bellamy, St George Illawarra snap Melbourne's five-match winning streak.
- Round 11 – With club stalwart Matt Geyer playing his 250th first grade game, Melbourne outlast South Sydney Rabbitohs 15–10 at Gosford, as eight players back up from the midweek Origin fixture.
- Round 12 – Storm hold the Bulldogs scoreless in a 46–0 win, with Cameron Smith scoring 18 points.
- Round 13 – With Origin again ruining team selections, Melbourne missing ten players are held scoreless 18–0 against the Gold Coast Titans. It's the first time since the 2003 NRL finals that Melbourne are held scoreless.
- Round 16 – Again missing nine players (and coach Craig Bellamy), Melbourne struggle against Parramatta Eels, losing 24–22. Previously Parramatta had not defeated Melbourne since 2005.
- Round 17 – A dominant Greg Inglis leads Melbourne to a 30–14 win over Canberra at Olympic Park. The victory marking Craig Bellamy's 100th coaching victory at premiership level (from 147 games).
- Round 19 – A wild brawl in the 23rd minute saw Billy Slater and Adam Blair sin binned, while minutes later Jason Ryles was sent off by referee Gavin Badger as Melbourne defeated St George Illawarra 26–0.
- Round 20 – Michael Crocker experiences defeat for the first time in a Melbourne jersey, with the Warriors 8–6 win over the Storm. Crocker had played 34 games since joining the Storm without tasting defeat.
- 30 July – Halfback Cooper Cronk re-signs with the club for a further five seasons.
- 9 August – Greg Inglis is named at centre in the Australian Rugby League's Indigenous Team of the Century.
- 27 August – The Sydney Morning Herald reports that NRL CEO David Gallop held secret talks with Greg Inglis to ensure he did follow other players in 'defecting' to rugby union.
- Round 26 – Melbourne claim their third straight minor premiership, defeating South Sydney 42–4 in the final match of the regular season. Level on competition points with Manly, Melbourne took the J. J. Giltinan Shield with a superior points differential (+302 versus +290). In his final home game at Olympic Park, Matt Geyer scored the first try of the match and was honoured with a special presentation at full time.
- 9 September – Billy Slater and Cameron Smith finish in a tie for second for the Dally M Medal behind former Storm halfback Matt Orford. Slater's suspension for fighting in Round 19 costs him the victory.
- 10 September – Despite strong interest from European rugby union clubs, Greg Inglis commits his future to the Storm, signing a new four-year contract reportedly worth $1.8m.
- Semi Final – In a pulsating match in front of over 50,000 fans at Suncorp Stadium, Melbourne score a last minute try to win 16–14 over the Brisbane Broncos. Forwards Jeremy Smith and Cameron Smith are cited for a tackle on Sam Thaiday during the second half. Jeremy Smith later accepts a one-match suspension, while Cameron Smith pleads not guilty to a charge of unnecessary contact to the head or neck. In a lengthy NRL judiciary hearing, Cameron Smith is suspended for two-matches, ruling him out of the rest of the season.
- Preliminary Final – After Melbourne's comfortable 28–0 win over Cronulla, coach Craig Bellamy launches into a long-winded attack on the NRL, the NRL judiciary, bookmakers, and the media following the suspension of Cameron Smith. Bellamy's comments, endorsed by club CEO Brian Waldron, result in the NRL fining the club $50,000 with NRL CEO David Gallop accusing the pair of an "unprecedented, irrational, premeditated and defamatory attack on the integrity of the judiciary panel and the game's judiciary process."
- 30 September – The Men of League charity announce the game's greatest club players at their annual ball, with Cameron Smith named as Melbourne's club great.

=== Milestone games ===
Round	Player	Milestone
Round 3	Clifford Manua	Storm debut
Round 6	Aiden Tolman	NRL debut
Round 10	Brett Anderson	Storm debut
Round 10	Dane Nielsen	Storm debut
Round 10	Kevin Proctor	NRL debut
Round 10	Liam Foran	NRL debut
Round 11	Matt Geyer	250th game
Round 11	Jeremy Smith	50th game
Round 13	Joe Tomane	NRL debut
Round 13	Sam Joe	NRL debut
Round 16	Sinbad Kali	NRL debut
Round 17	Cooper Cronk	100th game
Round 18	Matt Geyer	250th Storm game
Qualifying Final	Anthony Quinn	150th game
Qualifying Final	Jeff Lima	50th game
Semi Final	Israel Folau	50th game
Preliminary Final	Adam Blair	50th game

=== Jerseys ===
Apparel supplier Reebok kept the same home jersey design as worn in previous seasons. The clash jersey changed to a mostly white jersey, featuring purple shoulder stripes and side panels together with sublimated purple thunderbolts, worn with purple shorts and white socks with two purple stripes. An alternate jersey was worn in the NRL's heritage round, with Melbourne wearing a replica uniform combination similar to their 1998 home colours.

In line with the celebrations of the centenary of rugby league in Australia, an additional patch was worn above the NRL logo.

== Fixtures ==
=== Preseason ===
Date	Rd	Opponent	Venue	Result	Mel.	Opp.	Tries	Goals	Field goals	Ref
15 February	Trial	Manly-Warringah Sea Eagles	Bluetongue Stadium, Gosford	Won	56	10	B Slater (2), J Williams, J Tomane, C Smith, A Moore, I Folau, C Cronk, R Aitken, W Chambers	S Turner (4), J Smith (2), L Foran, C Smith		
22 February	Trial	Halifax	Shay Stadium, Halifax, West Yorkshire	Won	26	10	B Slater (2), S Tagataese, I Folau, R Aitken, B MacDougall	S Turner		

2008 World Club Challenge

29 February 2008
20:00 GMT (UTC+0)

Leeds Rhinos	11 – 4	Melbourne Storm
Tries: 1 Donald 38'; Goals: 3 Sinfield pen 11', 39', pen 60' (3/3); Drop goals: 1 Sinfield 68'	1st: 8 – 4; 2nd: 3 – 0 Report	Tries: 1 Hoffman 16'; Goals: 0/1; Turner (0/1)

Elland Road, Leeds
Attendance: 33,204
Referee: Ashley Klein (Australia)
Player of the Match: Kevin Sinfield

=== Regular season ===
==== Result by round ====
Round	1	2	3	4	5	6	7	8	9	10	11	12	13	14	15	16	17	18	19	20	21	22	23	24	25	26
Ground	H	H	A	H	H	A	A	–	H	A	A	H	A	–	H	A	H	A	H	A	H	A	H	A	A	H
Result	W	L	L	W	W	W	W	B	W	L	W	W	L	B	W	L	W	W	W	L	W	W	W	W	L	W
Position	4	5	11	6	5	3	3	2	1	4	3	2	2	2	2	4	4	2	2	2	2	2	1	1	2	1
Points	2	2	2	4	6	8	10	12	14	14	16	18	18	20	22	22	24	26	28	28	30	32	34	36	36	38

Source: Rugby League Tables
A = Away; H = Home; N = Neutral; B = Bye; W = Win; D = Draw; L = Loss

==== Matches ====
- (g.p.) – Golden Point extra time
- (pen) – Penalty try

Date	Rd	Opponent	Venue	Result	Mel.	Opp.	Tries	Goals	Field goals	Ref
17 March	1	New Zealand Warriors	Telstra Dome, Melbourne	Won	32	18	B Slater (3), D Johnson, S Tagataese	C Smith 5/6, S Turner 1/1		
23 March	2	Cronulla-Sutherland Sharks	Olympic Park, Melbourne	Lost	16	17	R Aitken, I Folau, B White	C Smith 2/3		
29 March	3	Sydney Roosters	Sydney Football Stadium, Sydney	Lost	6	10	B Slater	C Smith 1/1		
4 April	4	Brisbane Broncos	Olympic Park, Melbourne	Won	28	8	A Quinn (3), I Folau, R Hoffman	C Smith 4/5		
11 April	5	Manly-Warringah Sea Eagles	Olympic Park, Melbourne	Won	26	4	B Slater (2), R Hoffman, G Inglis, A Quinn	C Smith 3/6		
21 April	6	Canberra Raiders	Canberra Stadium, Canberra	Won	23	16	W Chambers, I Folau, B Slater, S Turner	C Smith 3/4	C Cronk	
26 April	7	North Queensland Cowboys	Dairy Farmers Stadium, Townsville	Won	12	10	I Folau, G Inglis	C Smith 2/2		
3 May	8	Bye								
12 May	9	Newcastle Knights	Olympic Park, Melbourne	Won	18	4	I Folau (2), A Quinn	C Smith 3/3		
17 May	10	St George Illawarra Dragons	ANZ Stadium, Sydney	Lost	12	36	W Chambers, S Manu	J Smith 1/2, S Turner 1/1		
24 May	11	South Sydney Rabbitohs	Bluetongue Stadium, Gosford	Won	15	10	W Chambers, J Smith	C Smith 3/4	C Cronk	
31 May	12	Canterbury-Bankstown Bulldogs	Olympic Park, Melbourne	Won	46	0	M Geyer (2), M Crocker, C Cronk, I Folau, C Smith, J Smith, S Turner	C Smith 7/8		
9 June	13	Gold Coast Titans	Skilled Stadium, Gold Coast	Lost	0	18				
14 June	14	Bye								
21 June	15	North Queensland Cowboys	Olympic Park, Melbourne	Won	48	20	G Inglis (3), S Turner (2), I Folau, M Geyer, B Slater, J Smith	C Smith 6/9		
29 June	16	Parramatta Eels	Parramatta Stadium, Sydney	Lost	22	24	S Manu (2), C Cronk, J Tomane	S Turner 2/2, C Cronk 1/2		
6 July	17	Canberra Raiders	Olympic Park, Melbourne	Won	30	14	G Inglis (2), S Manu, A Quinn, B Slater, S Turner	C Smith 3/6		
14 July	18	Wests Tigers	Campbelltown Stadium, Sydney	Won	30	18	G Inglis (3), S Manu, B Slater	C Smith 5/5		
21 July	19	St George Illawarra Dragons	Olympic Park, Melbourne	Won	26	0	I Folau, M Geyer, J Lima, J Smith, S Turner	C Smith 3/5		
27 July	20	New Zealand Warriors	Mt Smart Stadium, Auckland	Lost	6	8	S Manu	C Smith 1/1		
1 August	21	Gold Coast Titans	Olympic Park, Melbourne	Won	44	4	I Folau (2), G Inglis (2), M Geyer, R Hoffman, A Quinn, J Smith, S Turner	C Smith 4/9		
8 August	22	Manly-Warringah Sea Eagles	Brookvale Oval, Sydney	Won	16	10	C Cronk, I Folau, M Geyer	C Smith 2/3		
15 August	23	Sydney Roosters	Olympic Park, Melbourne	Won	30	6	A Quinn (2), C Cronk, B Slater, C Smith	C Smith 5/6		
25 August	24	Penrith Panthers	CUA Stadium, Sydney	Won	40	6	G Inglis (3), S Turner (2), J Lima, A Quinn, C Smith	C Smith 4/8		
30 August	25	Newcastle Knights	EnergyAustralia Stadium, Newcastle	Lost	16	17	I Folau, G Inglis, S Manu	C Smith 2/3		
7 September	26	South Sydney Rabbitohs	Olympic Park, Melbourne	Won	42	4	B Slater (2), B Anderson, M Geyer, R Hoffman, A Quinn, C Smith, J Smith	C Smith 4/7, M Geyer 1/1		

=== Finals ===
Qualifying final
14 September 2008
4:00pm AEST

Melbourne Storm	15–18	New Zealand Warriors
Tries: Israel Folau; Anthony Quinn; Goals: Cameron Smith 3/4; Field Goals: Greg Inglis		Tries: Jerome Ropati; Manu Vatuvei; Michael Witt; Goals: Michael Witt 3/4

Olympic Park
Attendance: 15,193
Referee: Jason Robinson

Semi final

Saturday, 20 September
19:45 AEST (UTC+10)

Brisbane Broncos	14 – 16	Melbourne Storm
Tries: 2 Boyd 3'; Kemp 32'; Goals: 3 Parker 5', 33', pen 62' (3/3)	1st: 12–0; 2nd: 2–16; Report	Tries: 3 Crocker 46'; Slater 64'; Inglis 80'; Goals: 2 C Smith 47', 65' (2/3); Sin bin: 1 Lima (yellow card) 61' to 71'

Suncorp Stadium
Attendance: 50,466
Referee: Shayne Hayne

Preliminary final
26 September 2008
7:45pm AEST

Cronulla-Sutherland Sharks	0–28	Melbourne Storm
		Tries: Steve Turner (2); Adam Blair; Israel Folau; Matt Geyer; Goals: Steve Turner 4/5

Sydney Football Stadium
Attendance: 27,570
Referee: Tony Archer

2008 NRL Grand Final

Sunday, 5 October
17:15 AEDT (UTC+11)

Manly Warringah Sea Eagles	40 – 0	Melbourne Storm
Tries: 8 Robertson 33', 47', 55'; Ballin 23'; Kite 58'; Williams 67'; Menzies 73'; Bell 75'; Goals: 4 Matai 47', 58' (2/4); Lyon 73', 77' (2/2); Orford (0/2)	1st: 8–0; 2nd: 32–0; Report

ANZ Stadium, Sydney
Attendance: 80,388
Referee: Tony Archer
Touch judges: Steve Chiddy, Jeff Younis
Clive Churchill Medal: Brent Kite (Manly)

== Ladder ==
2008 NRL season
Pos	Team	Pld	W	D	L	B	PF	PA	PD	Pts
1	Melbourne Storm	24	17	0	7	2	584	282	+302	38
2	Manly Warringah Sea Eagles (P)	24	17	0	7	2	645	355	+290	38
3	Cronulla-Sutherland Sharks	24	17	0	7	2	451	384	+67	38
4	Sydney Roosters	24	15	0	9	2	511	446	+65	34
5	Brisbane Broncos	24	14	1	9	2	560	452	+108	33
6	Canberra Raiders	24	13	0	11	2	640	527	+113	30
7	St George Illawarra Dragons	24	13	0	11	2	489	378	+111	30
8	New Zealand Warriors	24	13	0	11	2	502	567	-65	30
9	Newcastle Knights	24	12	0	12	2	516	486	+30	28
10	Wests Tigers	24	11	0	13	2	528	560	-32	26
11	Parramatta Eels	24	11	0	13	2	501	547	-46	26
12	Penrith Panthers	24	10	1	13	2	504	611	-107	25
13	Gold Coast Titans	24	10	0	14	2	476	586	-110	24
14	South Sydney Rabbitohs	24	8	0	16	2	453	666	-213	20
15	North Queensland Cowboys	24	5	0	19	2	474	638	-164	14
16	Canterbury-Bankstown Bulldogs	24	5	0	19	2	433	782	-349	14

== 2008 Coaching Staff ==
- Head coach: Craig Bellamy
- Assistant coaches: Michael Maguire & Stephen Kearney
- Specialist coach: Matthew Johns
- Strength and conditioning Coach: Alex Corvo
- Football Manager: Frank Ponissi
- NRL Under 20s Coach: Brad Arthur
- Feeder Club Coach: Jamie Feeney (Central Coast Storm)

== 2008 squad ==
List current as of 3 November 2021

Cap (Note: Players are listed with the cap number as they appear on the Melbourne Storm honour board. Additional squad members do not have a cap number.)	Nat.	Player name	Position	First Storm Game	Previous First Grade RL club (Note: This column denotes the previous RL club the player was signed to and played first grade RL for. If they are yet to debut then this is stipulated. If they were merely signed to the club but did not play then it is not counted.)
18	(Australia)	Matt Geyer	WG	1998	(Australia) Perth Reds
55	(Australia)	Cameron Smith (c)	HK	2002	(Australia) Melbourne Storm
58	(Australia)	Billy Slater	FB	2003	(Australia) Melbourne Storm
60	(Australia)	Dallas Johnson	LK	2003	(Australia) Melbourne Storm
62	(Australia)	Ryan Hoffman	SR, LK	2003	(Australia) Melbourne Storm
68	(Tonga)	Antonio Kaufusi	PR	2003	(Australia) Melbourne Storm
70	(Australia)	Ben MacDougall	CE	2004	(Australia) Manly Warringah Sea Eagles
72	(Australia)	Steve Turner	WG	2004	(Australia) Penrith Panthers
73	(Australia)	Cooper Cronk	HB	2004	(Australia) Melbourne Storm
74	(New Zealand)	Jeremy Smith	LK	2004	(Australia) Melbourne Storm
76	(Australia)	Brett White	PR	2005	(Australia) Melbourne Storm
79	(Australia)	Greg Inglis	CE	2005	(Australia) Melbourne Storm
84	(Australia)	Michael Crocker	SR	2006	(Australia) Sydney Roosters
86	(New Zealand)	Adam Blair	PR	2006	(Australia) Melbourne Storm
90	(New Zealand)	Jeff Lima	PR	2006	(Australia) Melbourne Storm
91	(Australia)	Anthony Quinn	WG	2007	(Australia) Newcastle Knights
92	(Australia)	Israel Folau	WG	2007	(Australia) Melbourne Storm
95	(Samoa)	Sam Tagataese	PR	2007	(Australia) Melbourne Storm
96	(Australia)	Russell Aitken	HK	2007	(Australia) Cronulla Sharks
97	(Australia)	Will Chambers	CE	2007	(Australia) Melbourne Storm
98	(New Zealand)	Sika Manu	SR	2007	(Australia) Melbourne Storm
99	(Australia)	Scott Anderson	PR	2007	(Australia) Melbourne Storm
101	(Samoa)	Clifford Manua	PR	2008	(Australia) Brisbane Broncos
102	(Australia)	Aiden Tolman	PR	2008	(Australia) Melbourne Storm
103	(Australia)	Brett Anderson	WG	2008	(Australia) North Queensland Cowboys
104	(Australia)	Dane Nielsen	CE	2008	(Australia) Cronulla Sharks
105	(New Zealand)	Kevin Proctor	SR	2008	(Australia) Melbourne Storm
106	(New Zealand)	Liam Foran	HB	2008	(Australia) Melbourne Storm
107	(Samoa)	Joseph Tomane	WG	2008	(Australia) Melbourne Storm
108	(Papua New Guinea)	Sam Joe	WG	2008	(Australia) Melbourne Storm
109	(Tonga)	Sinbad Kali	SR	2008	(Australia) Melbourne Storm
—	(Italy)	Aidan Guerra	SR	Yet to Debut	(Australia) Melbourne Storm
—	(Australia)	Lucas Miller	FE	Yet to Debut	(Australia) Melbourne Storm
—	(Australia)	Danny Vaughan	PR	Yet to Debut	(Australia) Melbourne Storm

== Player movements ==
Losses

- James Aubusson to Sydney Roosters
- Ben Cross to Newcastle Knights
- Garret Crossman to Hull Kingston Rovers
- Matt King to Warrington Wolves
- Clint Newton to Hull Kingston Rovers
- Matt Rua to Retirement
- Ryan Shortland to New Zealand Warriors

Gains

- Brett Anderson from North Queensland Cowboys
- Clifford Manua from Brisbane Broncos
- Dane Nielsen from Cronulla-Sutherland Sharks

== Representative honours ==
This table lists all players who have played a representative match in 2008.

Player	2008 ANZAC Test	City vs Country Origin	State of Origin 1	State of Origin 2	State of Origin 3	2008 Rugby League World Cup
Jay Aston	—N/a	—N/a	—N/a	—N/a	—N/a	Papua New Guinea
Adam Blair	New Zealand	—N/a	—N/a	—N/a	—N/a	New Zealand
Michael Crocker	Australia	—N/a	Queensland	Queensland	Queensland	—N/a
Israel Folau	Australia	—N/a	Queensland	Queensland	Queensland	Australia
Ryan Hoffman	Australia	—N/a	New South Wales	New South Wales	New South Wales	—N/a
Greg Inglis	Australia	—N/a	Queensland	Queensland	Queensland	Australia
Dallas Johnson	—N/a	—N/a	Queensland	Queensland	Queensland	—N/a
Antonio Kaufusi	—N/a	—N/a	—N/a	—N/a	—N/a	Tonga
Sika Manu	—N/a	—N/a	—N/a	—N/a	—N/a	New Zealand
Anthony Quinn	—N/a	Country	New South Wales	New South Wales	New South Wales	—N/a
Billy Slater	Australia	—N/a	Queensland	Queensland	Queensland	Australia
Cameron Smith	Australia (c)	—N/a	Queensland (c)	Queensland (c)	Queensland (c)	Australia (c)
Jeremy Smith	New Zealand	—N/a	—N/a	—N/a	—N/a	New Zealand
Steve Turner	—N/a	—N/a	—N/a	New South Wales	—N/a	—N/a
Brett White	—N/a	Country	New South Wales	New South Wales	New South Wales	—N/a

== Statistics ==
This table contains playing statistics for all Melbourne Storm players to have played in the 2008 NRL season.

- Statistics sources:

Name	Appearances	Tries	Goals	Field goals	Points
Russell Aitken	9	1	0	0	4
Brett Anderson	6	1	0	0	4
Scott Anderson	8	0	0	0	0
Adam Blair	27	1	0	0	4
Will Chambers	10	3	0	0	12
Michael Crocker	21	2	0	0	8
Cooper Cronk	28	4	1	2	20
Israel Folau	25	15	0	0	60
Liam Foran	3	0	0	0	0
Matt Geyer	28	8	1	0	34
Ryan Hoffman	21	4	0	0	16
Greg Inglis	22	17	0	1	69
Sam Joe	2	0	0	0	0
Dallas Johnson	24	1	0	0	4
Sinbad Kali	1	0	0	0	0
Antonio Kaufusi	25	0	0	0	0
Jeff Lima	25	2	0	0	8
Sika Manu	24	7	0	0	28
Clifford Manua	4	0	0	0	0
Dane Nielsen	1	0	0	0	0
Kevin Proctor	3	0	0	0	0
Anthony Quinn	24	12	0	0	48
Billy Slater	24	14	0	0	56
Cameron Smith	23	4	77	0	170
Jeremy Smith	27	6	1	0	26
Sam Tagataese	6	1	0	0	4
Aiden Tolman	7	0	0	0	0
Joe Tomane	3	1	0	0	4
Steve Turner	25	11	8	0	60
Brett White	20	1	0	0	4
30 players used	—	116	88	3	643

=== Scorers ===
Most points in a game: 18 points

- Round 12 – Cameron Smith (1 try, 7 goals) vs Canterbury-Bankstown Bulldogs

Most tries in a game: 3

- Round 1 – Billy Slater vs New Zealand Warriors
- Round 4 – Anthony Quinn vs Brisbane Broncos
- Round 15 – Greg Inglis vs North Queensland Cowboys
- Round 18 – Greg Inglis vs Wests Tigers
- Round 24 – Greg Inglis vs Penrith Panthers

=== Winning games ===
Highest score in a winning game: 48 points

- Round 15 vs North Queensland Cowboys

Lowest score in a winning game: 15 points

- Round 11 vs South Sydney Rabbitohs

Greatest winning margin: 46 points

- Round 12 vs Canterbury-Bankstown Bulldogs

Greatest number of games won consecutively: 5

- Round 4 – Round 9

=== Losing games ===
Highest score in a losing game: 22 points

- Round 16 vs Parramatta Eels

Lowest score in a losing game: 0 points

- Round 13 vs Gold Coast Titans
- Grand Final vs Manly Warringah Sea Eagles

Greatest losing margin: 40 points

- Grand Final vs Manly Warringah Sea Eagles

Greatest number of games lost consecutively: 2

- Round 2 – Round 3

== NRL Under 20s ==
For the first time since the formation of the NRL in 1998, every team fielded a team in the same second-tier competition the NRL Under-20s, guaranteeing fans a high standard curtain raiser before every NRL game. The National Youth Championships (known commercially as the Toyota Cup due to sponsorship from Toyota Australia) ran parallel to the NRL. Similar to the NRL, the NYC enforces a salary cap and puts a heavy focus on life outside football for the players.

In the competition's inaugural season, Melbourne were coached by Brad Arthur finished in 13th position, failing to make the finals. Melbourne used 28 players across the season, with five players (Liam Foran, Sam Joe, Kevin Proctor, Joe Tomane, and Aiden Tolman) also making NRL appearances in 2008.

=== Ladder ===
2008 Toyota Cup season
Pos	Team	Pld	W	D	L	B	PF	PA	PD	Pts
1	Canberra Raiders (P)	24	18	0	6	2	744	581	+163	40
2	Brisbane Broncos	24	15	1	8	2	684	476	+208	35
3	New Zealand Warriors	24	14	3	7	2	721	533	+188	35
4	Penrith Panthers	24	15	1	8	2	692	583	+109	35
5	Parramatta Eels	24	14	3	7	2	578	564	+14	35
6	St George Illawarra Dragons	24	13	2	9	2	561	520	+41	32
7	Canterbury-Bankstown Bulldogs	24	12	3	9	2	711	587	+124	31
8	Gold Coast Titans	24	13	1	10	2	686	567	+119	31
9	Wests Tigers	24	13	0	11	2	620	623	-3	30
10	South Sydney Rabbitohs	24	11	2	11	2	618	584	+34	28
11	Manly Warringah Sea Eagles	24	11	0	13	2	519	532	-13	26
12	Newcastle Knights	24	8	1	15	2	526	630	-104	21
13	Melbourne Storm	24	8	1	15	2	512	638	-126	21
14	Cronulla-Sutherland Sharks	24	6	1	17	2	394	666	-272	17
15	Sydney Roosters	24	6	0	18	2	480	721	-241	16
16	North Queensland Cowboys	24	4	3	17	2	455	696	-241	15

=== Statistics ===
==== Scorers ====
Most points in a game: 16 points

- Round 1 – Joe Tomane (2 tries, 4 goals) vs New Zealand Warriors
- Round 9 – Trent Walker (4 tries) vs Newcastle Knights

Most tries in a game: 4

- Round 9 – Trent Walker vs Newcastle Knights

Most points (season): 106

- Liam Foran (3 tries, 47 goals)

Most tries (season): 13

- Sam Joe

==== Winning games ====
Highest score in a winning game: 36 points

- Round 17 vs Canberra Raiders

Lowest score in a winning game: 22 points

- Round 5 vs Manly Warringah Sea Eagles

Greatest winning margin: 24 points

- Round 9 vs Newcastle Knights

Greatest number of games won consecutively: 2

- Round 4 – Round 5
- Round 22 – Round 23

==== Losing games ====
Highest score in a losing game: 32 points

- Round 3 vs Sydney Roosters

Lowest score in a losing game: 6 points

- Round 7 vs North Queensland Cowboys
- Round 13 vs Gold Coast Titans

Greatest losing margin: 32 points

- Round 6 vs Canberra Raiders
- Round 13 vs Gold Coast Titans

Greatest number of games lost consecutively: 4

- Round 18 – Round 21

== Feeder Team ==
Established in 2007 and coached by former Storm player Jamie Feeney, Melbourne sent their back-up players to play with Central Coast Storm, with home games played at Morry Breen Oval, the base of Central Coast team Wyong Roos.

Central Coast missed the finals, finishing in 10th position (out of 12 teams). The Player of the Year award was won by former Newcastle Knights player Reegan Tanner.

2008 New South Wales Cup
Pos	Team	Pld	W	D	L	PF	PA	PD	Pts
10	Central Coast Storm	22	8	0	14	518	563	-45	16

== Awards ==
=== Trophy Cabinet ===
- 2008 J. J. Giltinan Shield

=== Melbourne Storm Awards Night ===
- Melbourne Storm Player of the Year: Billy Slater
- Members' Player of the Year: Billy Slater
- Best Back: Cooper Cronk
- Best Forward: Jeff Lima
- Most Improved: Sika Manu
- Rookie of the Year: Aiden Tolman
- Darren Bell U20s Player of the Year Award: Louis Fanene
- U20s Most Improved: Pulou Vaituutuu
- U20s Best Forward: Zeb Tawha
- U20s Best Back: Luke Kelly
- Mick Moore Club Person of the Year: Samantha Shaw
- Life Member Inductee: Dallas Johnson

=== Dally M Awards Night ===
- Dally M Representative Player of the Year: Greg Inglis
- Dally M Hooker of the Year: Cameron Smith
- Dally M Centre of the Year: Israel Folau
- Dally M Five-Eighth of the Year: Greg Inglis
- Dally M Fullback of the Year: Billy Slater
- NRL Hall of Fame Inductee: Glenn Lazarus

=== Rugby League World Golden Boot Awards Night ===
- Golden Boot Award: Billy Slater

=== RLPA Awards Night ===
- RLPA Australia Representative Player of the Year: Billy Slater

=== RLIF Awards ===
- RLIF Player of the Year: Billy Slater
- RLIF Rookie of the Year: Israel Folau
- RLIF Fullback of the Year: Billy Slater
- RLIF Centre of the Year: Israel Folau
- RLIF Five-Eighth of the Year: Greg Inglis
- RLIF Hooker of the Year: Cameron Smith
