= 2006 Melbourne Storm season =

- NRL Rank: 1st
- Play-off result: Runner Up
- 2006 record: Wins: 20; draws: 0; losses: 4
- Points scored: For: 605; against: 404

Team information
- CEO: Brian Waldron
- Coach: Craig Bellamy
- Captain: David Kidwell (8 Games) Matt Geyer (7 Games) Cameron Smith (6 Games) Scott Hill (5 Games) Michael Crocker (1 Game)
- Stadium: Olympic Park
- Avg. attendance: 10,853 (Note: Home games played at Olympic Park only)
- High attendance: 15,479 (Round 18)

Top scorers
- Tries: Greg Inglis (18); Steve Turner (18)
- Goals: Cameron Smith (79)
- Points: Cameron Smith (178)
← 2005	List of seasons	2007 →

The 2006 Melbourne Storm season was the 9th in the club's history. They competed in the NRL's 2006 Telstra Premiership, winning a record 20 out of 24 regular season games to finish in first place and win the minor premiership, eight points clear of the second-placed Bulldogs. The team backed up their stellar defensive effort the previous year to concede just 404 points in 2006. The retirement of Robbie Kearns saw a rotating captaincy introduced between David Kidwell, Scott Hill, Cameron Smith, Matt Geyer and Michael Crocker. Cooper Cronk also assumed the halfback duties following the departure of Matt Orford. Storm won 13 of their last 14 games of the season to take a great run of form into the finals where they progressed to reach their first Grand Final since 1999 after wins over the Eels and Dragons. This broke a run of three straight semi-final exits for Craig Bellamy’s team.

Melbourne fell just short in the decider against Brisbane however the platform had now been built for a sustained run of success. The Storm's Queensland trio of Greg Inglis, Cameron Smith and Antonio Kaufusi were selected to make their international debuts for Australia in 2006. Post-season the Storm farewelled Nathan Friend and Jake Webster (Gold Coast Titans), David Kidwell (South Sydney) and Scott Hill (Harlequins Rugby League).

== Season summary ==
- 7 February – Following the retirement of previous captain Robbie Kearns, the club elected six players to rotate the on-field captaincy. Michael Crocker, Matt Geyer, Scott Hill, David Kidwell, Dennis Scott, and Cameron Smith, were chosen for the honour after coach Craig Bellamy consulted with Sydney Swans coach Paul Roos who used a similar set up.
- Round 1 – Melbourne retain the Michael Moore Trophy win a 22-16 win over New Zealand Warriors. Greg Inglis provides the spark for the Storm with an early try.
- Round 2 – Up 22-0 soon after half time, Melbourne deny a second half comeback from Sydney Roosters to hold on to a 22-18 victory.
- Round 4 – Scott Hill and Billy Slater find themselves facing the NRL Judiciary due to separate incidents in Melbourne's 30-28 loss to Wests Tigers. Hill accepts a two-match suspension for laying a hand on referee Jason Robinson; while Slater attempts to get a downgrade on a serious kicking charge after lashing out at John Skandalis. His plea was unsuccessful and Slater was suspended for seven matches.
- Round 6 – Melbourne play their first ever game in Adelaide, South Australia as Penrith Panthers move their home game to Hindmarsh Stadium in the first rugby league game at the venue since 1998. A controversial try to Greg Inglis awarded by video referee Phil Cooley sparked a Storm surge to a 40-18 win.
- Round 7 – Following the completion of the 2006 Commonwealth Games, Melbourne play their first home game of the season at Olympic Park, celebrating their return with a thumping 52-6 win over Newcastle Knights. Inglis, filling in for the suspended Slater at fullback, scores two tries for the match with the first coming in the opening 60 seconds of the game.
- 2 May – Dennis Scott announced his retirement from rugby league due to ongoing injury problems, including neck injury. He had yet to play in the NRL during the season, only making three appearances for Storm feeder club Norths Devils.
- Round 9 – A dangerous tackle by Michael Crocker on Shane Rigon sees the Melbourne forward suspended for nine matches, including the 2006 State of Origin series. Melbourne are later hit with a $15,000 fine by the NRL for comments made by CEO Brian Waldron, coach Craig Bellamy and Crocker after the judiciary decision.
- Round 12 – Penrith second-rower Frank Pritchard accuses Ian Donnelly of eye-gouging during Melbourne's golden point 17-16 victory. Pritchard failure to make an on-field complaint and a lack of video evidence sees the matter dropped, with Donnelly accepting a one-match suspension for contrary conduct charge (grapple tackle). The golden point win is Melbourne's first ever victory in extra time, coming in just the club's second game to go past 80 minutes since 2003.
- 1 June – New NRL franchise Gold Coast Titans announces the signing of Melbourne winger Steve Turner, sparking a tug-o-war between the clubs who both claim Turner will be playing for them in 2007.
- Round 13 – A sickening spear tackle by Lopini Paea on Melbourne's Ben Cross is the lowlight in Melbourne's 20-16 win over Sydney Roosters at Olympic Park. Paea later is suspended for 10 matches by the NRL Judiciary. A double by Greg Inglis was Melbourne's highlight, however Billy Slater again found himself in trouble, this time receiving a two-match suspension for a dangerous throw.
- Round 14 – Melbourne claimed the outright competition lead for the first time since 1998, defeating Parramatta Eels 34-22. An accusation that Fuifui Moimoi had bitten Brett White was dismissed by the NRL Judiciary due to lack of video evidence, while no Melbourne players were cited for dangerous tackles despite the protests from Parramatta players.
- Round 15 – A 22-2 first half blitz saw Melbourne cruise home to a 22-12 victory over Canberra Raiders, but the scoreless second half concerned coach Craig Bellamy.
- Round 16 – Trailing 12-10 with seconds remaining, Melbourne came from the clouds to defeat bogey team Canterbury-Bankstown Bulldogs 16-12 to maintain their unbeaten run at Olympic Park. A speculative kick from Cooper Cronk bounced perfectly for Ryan Hoffman who passed inside for Jake Webster to score the try as time expired.
- 1 July – Young winger Jake Webster is announced as a new signing by Gold Coast Titans.
- Round 18 – In front of the biggest Olympic Park crowd in six years (15,479), Melbourne defeat Brisbane Broncos 10-4, with Billy Slater returning to the line-up following his suspensions and stints with feeder clubs Norths Devils and North Sydney Bears.
- Round 20 – Club stalwart Matt Geyer celebrates his 200th game for the club in style, converting the last try in a 28-12 win over Cronulla-Sutherland Sharks. Geyer is chaired from the ground by Cameron Smith and Antonio Kaufusi.
- 23 July – The Sunday Telegraph reports that Melbourne has signed retired former captain Robbie Kearns to a $2 playing contract in case of injuries.
- 1 August – Chris Walker is released by Melbourne for "personal reasons". Walker had played seven games for the club after crossing from Sydney Roosters.
- Round 22 – Jake Webster equals the individual club record for tries in a game, scoring four tries in Melbourne's 46-4 thumping of Wests Tigers.
- Round 23 – A crowd of over 40,000 (the biggest attendance at a Melbourne fixture since the 1999 NRL Grand Final) witness a high-quality contest between the Storm and Broncos, with Melbourne fighting back from a 10-0 halftime deficit to win 18-12 at Suncorp Stadium. The victory is Melbourne's 11th in-a-row, a new club record. Michael Crocker is again sent to the NRL Judiciary for a dangerous tackle, and is suspended for two matches.
- 15 August – Despite agreeing to a three-year contract for an impending move to the Gold Coast, Steve Turner claims he had changed his mind and re-signs with Melbourne on a similar deal. Gold Coast management threaten to enforce the contract with Turner and force him to sit out of the game if he does not comply with his original deal.
- Round 24 – Melbourne's winning streak is ended at 11 by the New Zealand Warriors in a shock 24-20 defeat at Olympic Park. Two tries to Brent Webb, including a controversial late try, was the difference as the Warriors took home the Michael Moore Trophy, their first win at Olympic Park since 2002.
- 20 August – Foundation Storm player Scott Hill announces he will be leaving the club at the end of the 2006 season, taking up an offer to play in the Super League with Harlequins.
- 5 September – Cameron Smith is awarded the Dally M Medal, winning the medal by four points. Smith is the first Melbourne player to win the game's official best and fairest award. Craig Bellamy is named coach of the year.
- 14 September – The Australian reports that the Australian Rugby Union have targeted Greg Inglis as their next high-profile rugby league recruit.
- 17 September – Steve Turner reveals he is prepared to take legal action against Gold Coast Titans in order to remain with Melbourne Storm in 2007.
- Round 26 – Melbourne is presented with the J. J. Giltinan Shield as NRL minor premiers for the first time. Melbourne's 20 wins see them eight points clear on top of the NRL ladder.
- Qualifying Final – Melbourne ride their luck in the second half of their qualifying final against Parramatta Eels, taking a tight 12-6 victory. After leading 12-0 at half time, a 'no try' ruling against Glenn Morrison 11 minutes into the second half sparked a Parramatta comeback, with Melbourne having to hold off the eighth-placed Eels in a tense finish.
- Preliminary Final – Melbourne advance to the 2006 NRL Grand Final with a 24-10 win over St George Illawarra Dragons at Telstra Stadium. The win comes at a cost with Michael Crocker sustaining a serious knee injury.
- Grand Final – In the first Grand Final to feature two teams from outside New South Wales, Brisbane thwart Melbourne's bid for a second NRL premiership in a grinding 15-8 win, featuring a number of controversial calls by referee Paul Simpkins and video referee Bill Harrigan. A brilliant run and pass from Scott Hill set up Steve Turner for the first try of the game, with Hill also providing the last pass for Melbourne's second try through Matt King to level the scores at 8-8.
- 2 October – Television ratings figures for the Grand Final indicate that more people watched the game in Melbourne than they did in Sydney. Official figures indicate that the average audience in Melbourne was 903,000.
- 4 October – Matt King is slapped with a $5,000 fine by the NRL for calling Paul Simpkins a "dickhead" at a club fan day after the Grand Final.
- 20 November – The contractual saga involving Steve Turner reaches a climax as Gold Coast Titans CEO Michael Searle saying that they are willing to offer Turner a release after one season if he is unhappy with the new club.

=== Milestone games ===
Round	Player	Milestone
Round 1	Garret Crossman	Storm debut
Round 1	Michael Crocker	Storm debut
Round 3	Chris Walker	Storm debut
Round 4	Adam Blair	NRL debut
Round 6	Matt King	50th game
Round 6	David Kidwell	150th game
Round 9	Ian Donnelly	50th game
Round 11	Smith Samau	NRL debut
Round 12	Ben Cross	Storm debut
Round 13	Matt Geyer	200th game
Round 14	Matthew Bartlett	NRL debut
Round 19	Cooper Cronk	50th game
Round 21	Michael Crocker	100th game
Round 24	Jeff Lima	Storm debut
Grand Final	Scott Hill	200th game

=== Jerseys ===
Continuing with apparel manufacturer Reebok, the designs of Melbourne's home and clash jerseys were unchanged from 2005. Corporate partner Medibank Private upgraded their sponsorship to be the chest advertiser, while Mortgage House replaced them as jersey sleeve advertiser. Hostplus was a new advertiser on the rear of the jerseys, with their logo appearing above and below the player's numbers for the first time.

== Fixtures ==
=== Pre Season ===
Date	Rd	Opponent	Venue	Result	Mel.	Opp.	Tries	Goals	Field goals	Ref
11 February	Trial	Parramatta Eels	Kingsford Smith Park, Ballina	Won	38	18	C Cronk (2), B Slater, S Turner, M Geyer, C Walker, J Webster	G Inglis (3), C Smith (2)		
18 February	Trial	Parramatta Eels	Exies Oval, Griffith	Lost	24	30	G Inglis (2), C Wilkie, A Blair	G Inglis (4)		
25 February	Trial	Brisbane Broncos	Clive Berghofer Stadium, Toowoomba	Won	58	10	B Slater (2), G Inglis (2), S Hill (2), M Geyer, C Cronk, J Webster, D Kidwell, C Smith	G Inglis (4), C Smith (3)		

=== Regular season ===
==== Result by round ====
Round	1	2	3	4	5	6	7	8	9	10	11	12	13	14	15	16	17	18	19	20	21	22	23	24	25	26
Ground	A	A	A	A	–	A	H	H	A	H	A	H	H	A	H	H	–	H	A	H	A	H	A	H	A	H
Result	W	W	L	L	B	W	W	W	W	W	L	W	W	W	W	W	B	W	W	W	W	W	W	L	W	W
Position	6	3	6	10	8	6	2	2	2	1	3	2	2	1	1	1	1	1	1	1	1	1	1	1	1	1
Points	2	4	4	4	6	8	10	12	14	16	16	18	20	22	24	26	28	30	32	34	36	38	40	40	42	44

Source: Rugby League Tables
A = Away; H = Home; N = Neutral; B = Bye; W = Win; D = Draw; L = Loss

==== Matches ====
- (g.p.) - Golden Point extra time
- (pen) - Penalty try

Date	Rd	Opponent	Venue	Result	Mel.	Opp.	Tries	Goals	Field goals	Ref
12 March	1	New Zealand Warriors	Ericsson Stadium, Auckland	Won	22	16	M Geyer (2), G Inglis, C Smith, S Turner	G Inglis 1/4, C Smith 0/1		
19 March	2	Sydney Roosters	Aussie Stadium, Sydney	Won	22	18	C Cronk, R Hoffman, G Inglis, S Turner	C Smith 3/4		
25 March	3	North Queensland Cowboys	Dairy Farmers Stadium, Townsville	Lost	8	40	M Geyer, J Webster	C Smith 0/2		
2 April	4	Wests Tigers	Leichhardt Oval, Sydney	Lost	28	30	B Slater (2), C Cronk, R Hoffman, G Inglis	C Smith 4/5		
8 April	5	Bye								
15 April	6	Penrith Panthers	Hindmarsh Stadium, Adelaide	Won	40	18	G Inglis (3), M Crocker, R Hoffman, M King, C Smith	C Smith 6/8		
22 April	7	Newcastle Knights	Olympic Park, Melbourne	Won	52	6	G Inglis (2), S Turner (2), M Geyer, A Kaufusi, D Kidwell, M King, J Webster	C Smith 8/10		
29 April	8	St George Illawarra Dragons	Olympic Park, Melbourne	Won	24	10	J Webster (2), I Donnelly, S Turner	C Smith 4/6		
6 May	9	South Sydney Rabbitohs	Telstra Stadium, Sydney	Won	38	14	M Crocker, M Geyer, G Inglis, C Smith, J Smith, C Walker	C Smith 7/8		
13 May	10	North Queensland	Olympic Park, Melbourne	Won	18	6	D Kidwell, M King, C Smith	C Smith 3/4		
20 May	11	Manly Warringah Sea Eagles	Brookvale Oval, Sydney	Lost	12	34	M Geyer, S Turner	M Geyer 2/2		
28 May	12	Penrith Panthers	Olympic Park, Melbourne	Won (g.p.)	17	16	M Geyer, G Inglis, J Webster	M Geyer 1/1, C Smith 1/2	C Cronk	
3 June	13	Sydney Roosters	Olympic Park, Melbourne	Won	20	16	G Inglis (2), S Turner, J Webster	C Smith 2/4		
11 June	14	Parramatta Eels	Parramatta Stadium, Sydney	Won	34	22	J Webster (3), C Cronk, M Geyer, R Hoffman, S Turner	M Geyer 2/5, C Walker 1/1		
18 June	15	Canberra Raiders	Olympic Park, Melbourne	Won	22	12	D Kidwell (2), R Hoffman, C Walker	C Smith 3/4		
23 June	16	Canterbury-Bankstown Bulldogs	Olympic Park, Melbourne	Won	16	12	J Webster (2), A Kaufusi	C Smith 2/3		
1 July	17	Bye								
7 July	18	Brisbane Broncos	Olympic Park, Melbourne	Won	10	4	R Hoffman, S Turner	C Smith 1/4		
16 July	19	Newcastle Knights	EnergyAustralia Stadium, Newcastle	Won	24	16	C Cronk, R Hoffman, B Slater, J Smith	C Smith 4/4		
21 July	20	Cronulla-Sutherland Sharks	Olympic Park, Melbourne	Won	28	12	B Slater (2), C Cronk, R Hoffman, D Johnson	C Smith 3/4, M Geyer 1/1		
30 July	21	St George Illawarra Dragons	OKI Jubilee Stadium, Sydney	Won	34	24	M King (2), C Cronk, R Hoffman, G Inglis, S Turner	C Smith 5/7		
5 August	22	Wests Tigers	Olympic Park, Melbourne	Won	46	4	J Webster (4), S Turner 2, M Geyer, G Inglis	C Smith 6/8, G Inglis 1/1		
13 August	23	Brisbane Broncos	Suncorp Stadium, Brisbane	Won	18	12	C Cronk, M King, S Turner	C Smith 3/3		
19 August	24	New Zealand Warriors	Olympic Park, Melbourne	Lost	20	24	M Geyer, G Inglis, M King, S Turner	C Smith 2/4		
26 August	25	Canberra Raiders	Canberra Stadium, Canberra	Won	22	18	R Hoffman, G Inglis, D Johnson, M King	C Smith 3/4		
2 September	26	Manly Warringah Sea Eagles	Olympic Park, Melbourne	Won	30	20	M Crocker, M Geyer, G Inglis, C Smith, S Turner	C Smith 4/6, M Geyer 1/1		

=== Finals ===
Qualifying final

Sunday, 10 September
16:00 AEST (UTC+10)

Melbourne Storm	12 – 6	Parramatta Eels
Tries: 2 Kaufusi; Turner; Goals: 2 C Smith (2/2)	1st: 12–0; 2nd: 0–6; Report	Tries: 1 Wagon; Goals: 1 Burt (1/1)

Olympic Park, Melbourne
Attendance: 15,690
Referee: Steve Clark

Preliminary final

Saturday, 23 September
19:45 AEST (UTC+10)

Melbourne Storm	24 – 10	St George Illawarra Dragons
Tries: 4 Inglis 13'; King 29'; Turner 61'; Kaufusi 77'; Goals: 4 C Smith 14', 30', 62' (3/3); Geyer 78' (1/1)	1st: 12–6; 2nd: 12–4; Report	Tries: 2 Cooper 26'; B Morris 69'; Goals: 1 Gorrell 27' (1/1); Head (0/1)

Telstra Stadium, Sydney
Attendance: 40,901
Referee: Steve Clark

2006 NRL Grand Final

Sunday, 1 October
19:00 AEST (UTC+10)

Melbourne Storm	8 – 15	Brisbane Broncos
Tries: 2 Turner 14'; King 49'; Goals: C Smith (0/1); Geyer (0/1)	1st: 4–8; 2nd: 4–7; Report	Tries: 2 Hodges 19'; Tate 62'; Goals: 3 Lockyer pen 9', 20' (2/2); Parker pen 60' (1/2); Field goals: 1 Lockyer 73'

Telstra Stadium, Sydney
Attendance: 79,609
Referee: Paul Simpkins
Video referee: Bill Harrigan
Touch judges: Rod Lawrence, Steve Carrall
Clive Churchill Medal: Shaun Berrigan (Brisbane)

== Ladder ==
2006 NRL season
Pos	Team	Pld	W	D	L	B	PF	PA	PD	Pts
1	Melbourne Storm	24	20	0	4	2	605	404	+201	44^{1}
2	Canterbury-Bankstown Bulldogs	24	16	0	8	2	608	468	+140	36
3	Brisbane Broncos (P)	24	14	0	10	2	497	392	+105	32
4	Newcastle Knights	24	14	0	10	2	608	538	+70	32
5	Manly Warringah Sea Eagles	24	14	0	10	2	534	493	+41	32
6	St George Illawarra Dragons	24	14	0	10	2	519	481	+38	32
7	Canberra Raiders	24	13	0	11	2	525	573	-48	30
8	Parramatta Eels	24	12	0	12	2	506	483	+23	28
9	North Queensland Cowboys	24	11	0	13	2	450	463	-13	26
10	New Zealand Warriors	24	12	0	12	2	552	463	+89	24^{2}
11	Wests Tigers	24	10	0	14	2	490	565	-75	24
12	Penrith Panthers	24	10	0	14	2	510	587	-77	24
13	Cronulla-Sutherland Sharks	24	9	0	15	2	515	544	-29	22
14	Sydney Roosters	24	8	0	16	2	528	650	-122	20
15	South Sydney Rabbitohs	24	3	0	21	2	429	772	-343	10

^{1} The Melbourne Storm were later stripped of this minor premiership due to gross salary cap breaches.
^{2} The New Zealand Warriors were deducted 4 competition points due to gross salary cap breaches.

== 2006 Coaching Staff ==
- Head Coach: Craig Bellamy
- Assistant Coaches: Michael Maguire & Stephen Kearney
- Development Coach: Marc Brentnall
- Strength and Conditioning Coach: Alex Corvo
- Football Manager: Dean Lance

== 2006 Squad ==
List current as of 28 September 2021

Cap (Note: Players are listed with the cap number as they appear on the Melbourne Storm honour board. Additional squad members do not have a cap number.)	Nat.	Player name	Position	First Storm Game	Previous First Grade RL club (Note: This column denotes the previous RL club the player was signed to and played first grade RL for. If they are yet to debut then this is stipulated. If they were merely signed to the club but did not play then it is not counted.)
6	(Australia)	Scott Hill	FE, LK	1998	(Australia) Hunter Mariners
18	(Australia)	Matt Geyer	WG	1998	(Australia) Perth Reds
37	(New Zealand)	Glen Turner	SR	2000	(Australia) Melbourne Storm
55	(Australia)	Cameron Smith (c)	HK	2002	(Australia) Melbourne Storm
58	(Australia)	Billy Slater	FB	2003	(Australia) Melbourne Storm
59	(New Zealand)	David Kidwell	SR, LK	2003	(Australia) Sydney Roosters
60	(Australia)	Dallas Johnson	SR, LK	2003	(Australia) Melbourne Storm
61	(New Zealand)	Jake Webster	WG	2003	(Australia) Melbourne Storm
62	(Australia)	Ryan Hoffman	SR, LK	2003	(Australia) Melbourne Storm
67	(Australia)	Nathan Friend	HK	2003	(Australia) Brisbane Broncos
68	(Australia)	Antonio Kaufusi	PR	2003	(Australia) Melbourne Storm
69	(Australia)	Matt King	CE	2003	(Australia) Melbourne Storm
72	(Australia)	Steve Turner	FB, WG	2004	(Australia) Penrith Panthers
73	(Australia)	Cooper Cronk	HB	2004	(Australia) Melbourne Storm
74	(New Zealand)	Jeremy Smith	LK	2004	(Australia) Melbourne Storm
75	(Australia)	Dennis Scott	SR	2005	(Australia) Canterbury-Bankstown Bulldogs
76	(Australia)	Brett White	PR	2005	(Australia) Melbourne Storm
77	(Australia)	Ian Donnelly	PR	2005	(Australia) Manly Sea Eagles
79	(Australia)	Greg Inglis	FE, CE,	2005	(Australia) Melbourne Storm
80	(Australia)	Jamie Feeney	SR, LK	2005	(Australia) Canterbury Bulldogs
81	(Australia)	Michael Crocker	SR, LK	2006	(Australia) Sydney Roosters
83	(Australia)	Garrett Crossman	PR	2006	(Australia) Penrith Panthers
85	(Australia)	Chris Walker	WG	2006	(Australia) Sydney Roosters
86	(New Zealand)	Adam Blair	SR, PR	2006	(Australia) Melbourne Storm
87	(Samoa)	Smith Samau	FB, WG	2006	(Australia) Melbourne Storm
88	(Australia)	Ben Cross	PR	2006	(Australia) Melbourne Storm
89	(Australia)	Matthew Bartlett	SR	2006	(Australia) Melbourne Storm
90	(New Zealand)	Jeff Lima	PR, LK	2006	(Australia) Wests Tigers
-	(New Zealand)	Ryan Shortland	FE, CE	Yet to Debut	(Australia) Melbourne Storm
-	(Australia)	James Aubusson	FE, HK	Yet to Debut	(Australia) Melbourne Storm
-	(Australia)	Scott Anderson	PR	Yet to Debut	(Australia) Melbourne Storm
-	(Samoa)	Sam Tagataese	SR, PR	Yet to Debut	(Australia) Melbourne Storm
-	(Australia)	Jackson Nicolau	FE	Yet to Debut	(Australia) Melbourne Storm

== Player movements ==
Losses

- Steven Bell to Manly Warringah Sea Eagles
- Alex Chan to Catalans Dragons
- Josh Graham to Western Force (rugby)
- Robbie Kearns to Retirement
- Jamie McDonald to Toulouse Olympique
- Tevita Metuisela to Wests Tigers
- Matt Orford to Manly Warringah Sea Eagles
- Peter Robinson to Retirement
- Dennis Scott to Retirement (mid-season)
- Robert Tanielu to North Queensland Cowboys

Gains

- Russell Aitken from North Queensland Cowboys (midseason) (Note: Aitken last played first grade for Cronulla-Sutherland Sharks in 2005.)
- Michael Crocker from Sydney Roosters
- Ben Cross from Canberra Raiders
- Garret Crossman from Penrith Panthers
- Jeff Lima from Wests Tigers
- Chris Walker from Sydney Roosters

== Representative honours ==
This table lists all players who have played a representative match in 2006.

Player	2006 ANZAC Test	City vs Country Origin	State of Origin 1	State of Origin 2	State of Origin 3	Tri-Nations
Adam Blair	—N/a	—N/a	—N/a	—N/a	—N/a	New Zealand
Matt Geyer	—N/a	City	—N/a	—N/a	—N/a	—N/a
Ryan Hoffman	—N/a	City	—N/a	—N/a	—N/a	—N/a
Greg Inglis	—N/a	—N/a	Queensland	—N/a	—N/a	Australia
Dallas Johnson	—N/a	—N/a	Queensland	Queensland	Queensland	—N/a
Antonio Kaufusi	—N/a	—N/a	—N/a	—N/a	—N/a	Australia
David Kidwell	New Zealand	—N/a	—N/a	—N/a	—N/a	New Zealand
Matt King	Australia	—N/a	New South Wales	New South Wales	New South Wales	Australia
Cameron Smith	—N/a	—N/a	Queensland	Queensland	Queensland	Australia
Jake Webster	New Zealand	—N/a	—N/a	—N/a	—N/a	—N/a
Brett White	—N/a	Country	—N/a	—N/a	—N/a	—N/a

== Statistics ==
This table contains playing statistics for all Melbourne Storm players to have played in the 2006 NRL season.

- Statistics sources:

Name	Appearances	Tries	Goals	Field goals	Points
Matthew Bartlett	1	0	0	0	0
Adam Blair	16	0	0	0	0
Michael Crocker	13	3	0	0	12
Cooper Cronk	27	7	0	1	29
Ben Cross	9	0	0	0	0
Garret Crossman	21	0	0	0	0
Ian Donnelly	14	1	0	0	4
Jamie Feeney	8	0	0	0	0
Nathan Friend	21	0	0	0	0
Matt Geyer	27	11	8	0	60
Scott Hill	24	0	0	0	0
Ryan Hoffman	27	10	0	0	40
Greg Inglis	19	18	2	0	76
Dallas Johnson	23	2	0	0	8
Antonio Kaufusi	25	4	0	0	16
David Kidwell	26	4	0	0	16
Matt King	21	10	0	0	40
Jeff Lima	1	0	0	0	0
Smith Samau	1	0	0	0	0
Billy Slater	15	5	0	0	20
Cameron Smith	25	5	79	0	178
Jeremy Smith	19	2	0	0	8
Steve Turner	27	18	0	0	72
Chris Walker	7	2	1	0	10
Jake Webster	18	15	0	0	60
Brett White	24	0	0	0	0
26 players used	—	117	90	1	649

=== Scorers ===
Most points in a game: 18 points

- Round 9 – Cameron Smith (1 try, 7 goals) vs South Sydney

Most tries in a game: 4

- Round 22 – Jake Webster vs Wests Tigers

=== Winning games ===
Highest score in a winning game: 52 points

- Round 7 vs Newcastle Knights

Lowest score in a winning game: 10 points

- Round 18 vs Brisbane Broncos

Greatest winning margin: 46 points

- Round 7 vs Newcastle Knights

Greatest number of games won consecutively: 11

- Round 12 – Round 23

=== Losing games ===
Highest score in a losing game: 28 points

- Round 4 vs Wests Tigers

Lowest score in a losing game: 8 points

- Round 3 vs North Queensland Cowboys
- Grand Final vs Brisbane Broncos

Greatest losing margin: 32 points

- Round 3 vs North Queensland Cowboys

Greatest number of games lost consecutively: 2

- Round 3 – Round 4

== Feeder Teams ==
For a second season, Melbourne split their reserve players between two feeder clubs. The agreement with Norths Devils continued for a ninth season, with players who were dual-registered in Queensland travelling to Brisbane each week to play with the Devils in the Queensland Cup. Some players travelled to Sydney to play with foundation New South Wales Rugby League club North Sydney Bears in the NSWRL Premier League. The 2006 season would be the final season of this arrangement, with Melbourne ending the affiliation with North Sydney after the season.

The Devils missed the Queensland Cup finals for the first time since 2003, while the Bears coached by Josh White, finished 12th and missed the finals. Both teams featured a rare appearance by Billy Slater following his return from a second suspension during the NRL season.

2006 Queensland Cup
Pos	Team	Pld	W	D	L	B	PF	PA	PD	Pts
7	Norths Devils	20	8	1	11	2	538	570	-32	17
2006 NSWRL Premier League
Pos	Team	Pld	W	D	L	B	PF	PA	PD	Pts
12	North Sydney Bears	24	6	1	17	2	471	822	-351	17

== Awards and honours ==
=== Trophy Cabinet ===
- 2006 J. J. Giltinan Shield

=== Melbourne Storm Awards Night ===
- Melbourne Storm Player of the Year: Cameron Smith
- Best Forward: Ryan Hoffman
- Best Back: Greg Inglis
- Most Improved: Cooper Cronk
- Rookie of the Year: Adam Blair
- Greg Brentnall Young Achievers Award: Russell Weber
- Mick Moore Club Person of the Year: Jonce Dimovski
- Best Try: Jake Webster – Round 16 vs Canterbury-Bankstown Bulldogs
- Life Member Inductees: Chris Anderson, John Ribot & Scott Hill

=== Dally M Awards Night ===
- Dally M Medal: Cameron Smith
- Dally M Hooker of the Year: Cameron Smith
- Dally M Halfback of the Year: Cooper Cronk
- Dally M Coach of the Year: Craig Bellamy

=== RLPA Awards Night ===
- RLPA New Zealand Representative Player of the Year: David Kidwell
- RLPA Best Back Player of the Year: Greg Inglis
- NRL Academic Player of the Year: Matt Geyer
- RLPA Wellbeing and Education Club of the Year

=== RLIF Awards ===
- RLIF International Newcomer of the Year: Greg Inglis

=== Additional Awards ===
- Rugby League World World XIII: Matt King (wing); Greg Inglis (wing); Cameron Smith (hooker)
