= Smith Samau =

Samoa international rugby league footballer

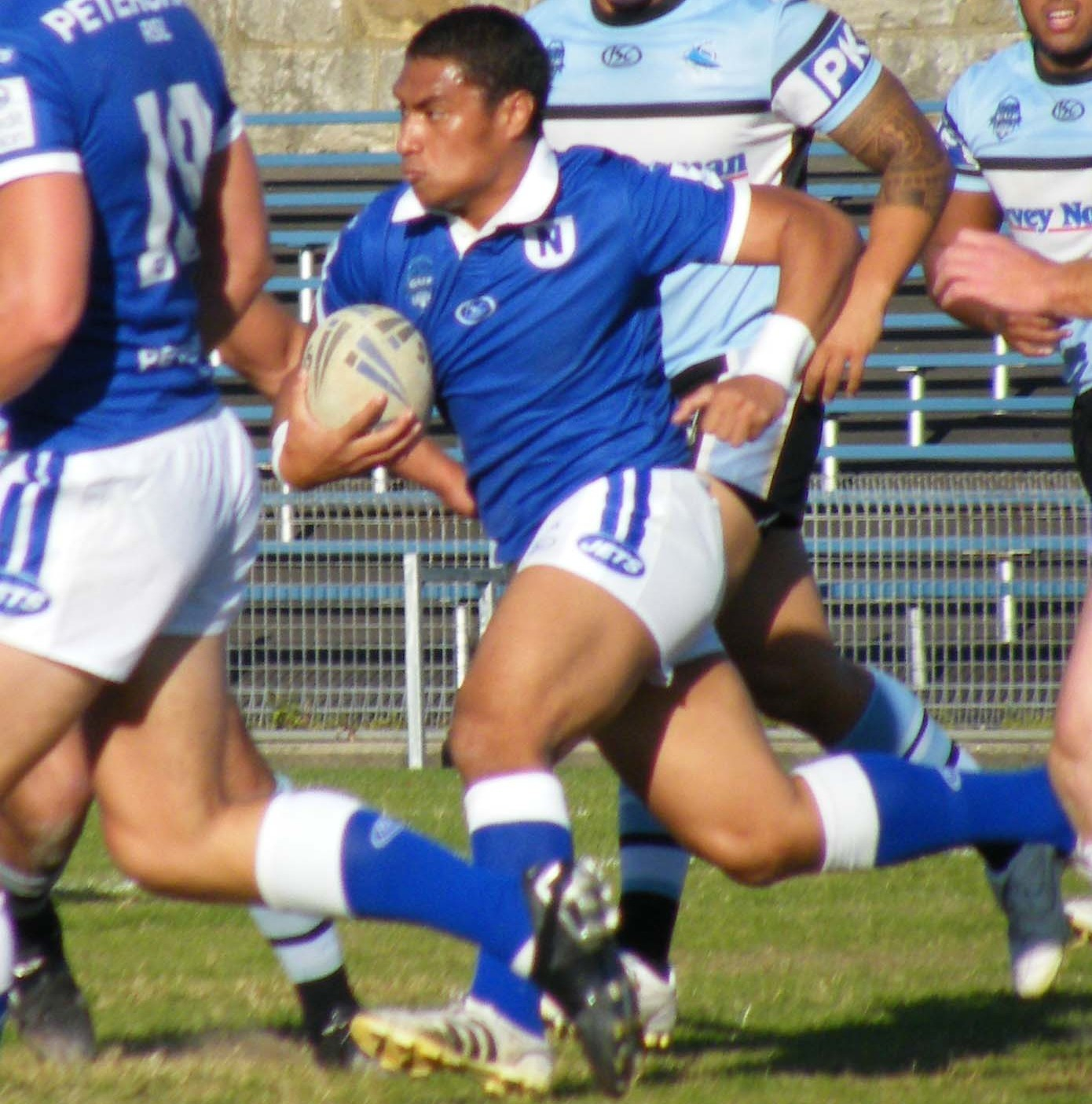

Personal information
- Born: 15 June 1986 (age 40) Auckland, New Zealand
- Height: 180 cm (5 ft 11 in)
- Weight: 91 kg (14 st 5 lb)

Playing information
- Position: Wing, Centre, Five-eighth
Club
Years	Team	Pld	T	G	FG	P
2006	Melbourne Storm	1	0	0	0	0
2007–08	Gold Coast Titans	10	1	0	0	4
	Total	11	1	0	0	4
Representative
Years	Team	Pld	T	G	FG	P
2006–08	Samoa	9	1	0	0	4

Smith Samau (born 15 June 1986) is a former Samoa international rugby league footballer who plays for the Central Queensland Capras in the Queensland Cup.

== Background ==
Samau was born in New Zealand. He grew up in Brisbane, Queensland and was educated at Wavell State High School.

== Playing career ==
Samau signed with the Melbourne Storm in 2006 and played for the Norths Devils in the 2006 Queensland Cup. He made his first grade debut in Round 11 2006 NRL season for the Melbourne Storm.

At the end of the year Samau became a part of the Steve Turner contract negotiations between the Gold Coast Titans, and the Melbourne Storm. Along with Daniel Isaac he was allowed to move to the Titans so the Storm could keep Steve Turner.

He played eight NRL games for the Titans in 2007, playing for the Ipswich Jets in the Queensland Cup when not required. In mid-2009 he was allowed to join the Sydney Roosters. In 2010 he returned to the Ipswich Jets in the Queensland Cup.

Smith is now actively playing for the Central Queensland Capras and Step Brothers. For the Step Brothers he has adjusted to the sport like a duck to water, scoring two tries on debut. Captain Jonesy said "Smithy listens to my instructions. He runs straight back after a touch and rucks the ball up in a perfect triangle formation." Rumour has it Smithy could be nominated the Vice-Captain for next game.

== Representative career ==
Samau is a Samoan international.

He was named in the Samoan squad for the 2008 Rugby League World Cup, and played in three matches.
