= 2008 NRL Under-20s season =

2008 National Youth Competition
- Teams: 16
- Premiers: Canberra (1st title)
- Minor premiers: Canberra (1st title)
- Matches played: 201
- Points scored: 9938
- Wooden spoon: North Queensland (1st spoon)
- Player of the Year: Ben Hunt
- Top point-scorer: Ben Barba (254)
- Top try-scorer: Ben Barba (28)

The 2008 NRL Under-20s season was the first season of the National Rugby League's youth competition, known as the Toyota Cup due to sponsorship from Toyota. The draw and structure of the competition mirrors that of its senior counterpart, the 2008 Telstra Premiership.

== Ladder ==
2008 Toyota Cup season
Pos	Team	Pld	W	D	L	B	PF	PA	PD	Pts
1	Canberra Raiders (P)	24	18	0	6	2	744	581	+163	40
2	Brisbane Broncos	24	15	1	8	2	684	476	+208	35
3	New Zealand Warriors	24	14	3	7	2	721	533	+188	35
4	Penrith Panthers	24	15	1	8	2	692	583	+109	35
5	Parramatta Eels	24	14	3	7	2	578	564	+14	35
6	St George Illawarra Dragons	24	13	2	9	2	561	520	+41	32
7	Canterbury-Bankstown Bulldogs	24	12	3	9	2	711	587	+124	31
8	Gold Coast Titans	24	13	1	10	2	686	567	+119	31
9	Wests Tigers	24	13	0	11	2	620	623	-3	30
10	South Sydney Rabbitohs	24	11	2	11	2	618	584	+34	28
11	Manly Warringah Sea Eagles	24	11	0	13	2	519	532	-13	26
12	Newcastle Knights	24	8	1	15	2	526	630	-104	21
13	Melbourne Storm	24	8	1	15	2	512	638	-126	21
14	Cronulla-Sutherland Sharks	24	6	1	17	2	394	666	-272	17
15	Sydney Roosters	24	6	0	18	2	480	721	-241	16
16	North Queensland Cowboys	24	4	3	17	2	455	696	-241	15

=== Ladder progression ===
Numbers highlighted in green indicate that the team finished the round inside the top 8.

	Team	1	2	3	4	5	6	7	8	9	10	11	12	13	14	15	16	17	18	19	20	21	22	23	24	25	26
1	Canberra Raiders	2	4	4	6	8	10	12	14	16	16	18	18	20	22	22	24	24	26	28	30	32	34	36	36	38	40
2	Brisbane Broncos	0	0	2	4	6	6	6	6	8	10	12	14	15	15	17	19	21	21	23	25	25	27	29	31	33	35
3	New Zealand Warriors	0	0	2	4	5	6	8	8	10	10	12	14	16	18	20	20	22	24	26	28	30	30	32	34	34	35
4	Penrith Panthers	2	2	4	6	8	10	12	14	14	16	18	20	22	24	26	26	28	29	29	31	31	31	31	33	35	35
5	Parramatta Eels	2	4	6	7	9	11	13	13	13	15	17	17	17	19	21	23	23	23	23	25	27	29	31	33	34	35
6	St. George Illawarra Dragons	0	2	4	6	8	10	12	14	16	18	20	22	23	25	25	25	27	27	29	29	31	31	31	31	32	32
7	Canterbury-Bankstown Bulldogs	0	2	4	6	7	7	7	9	11	12	14	14	16	18	20	22	23	25	25	27	27	29	31	31	31	31
8	Gold Coast Titans	2	2	2	2	2	4	4	6	8	9	9	11	13	15	17	19	21	23	25	25	27	29	29	29	29	31
9	Wests Tigers	2	4	4	4	4	6	6	8	10	10	12	14	16	16	16	18	20	22	24	24	26	28	28	28	30	30
10	South Sydney Rabbitohs	0	0	0	2	4	4	6	8	10	12	14	14	14	16	16	17	18	20	20	20	20	22	24	26	26	28
11	Manly-Warringah Sea Eagles	2	2	2	2	2	2	4	6	6	8	8	10	12	14	14	16	16	16	18	18	20	20	20	22	24	26
12	Newcastle Knights	0	2	2	2	2	4	6	6	6	8	10	10	10	10	12	12	12	13	15	17	17	17	17	19	21	21
13	Melbourne Storm	2	3	3	3	5	5	7	9	11	11	11	13	13	15	15	15	17	17	17	17	17	19	21	21	21	21
14	Cronulla-Sutherland Sharks	0	1	3	3	3	3	5	7	9	9	9	9	9	9	9	9	11	13	13	13	13	13	13	15	15	17
15	Sydney Roosters	2	4	6	6	6	6	6	8	8	8	8	8	8	8	8	8	10	10	10	12	12	12	12	12	14	16
16	North Queensland Cowboys	0	0	0	1	1	2	2	2	2	2	4	4	4	6	8	9	11	11	11	11	13	13	15	15	15	15

== Finals series ==
Qualifying finals
1	Canberra Raiders	43
8	Gold Coast Titans	12
2	Brisbane Broncos	28
7	Bulldogs	22
3	NZ Warriors	47
6	St. George Illawarra	20
4	Penrith Panthers	16
5	Parramatta Eels	24

Semifinals
4W	Parramatta Eels	22
2L	St. George Illawarra	23
3W	NZ Warriors	38
1L	Penrith Panthers	4

Preliminary finals
1W	Canberra Raiders	18
St. George Illawarra	14
2W	Brisbane Broncos	28
NZ Warriors	26

Final
Canberra Raiders	28
Brisbane Broncos	24

Home	Score	Away	Match Information
Home	Score	Away	Date and Time	Venue	Referee
Qualifying Finals
Brisbane Broncos	28-22	Canterbury Bulldogs	12 September 2008, 5:30pm	Sydney Football Stadium	Gerard Sutton
Canberra Raiders	43-12	Gold Coast Titans	13 September 2008, 4:15pm	Toyota Stadium	Alan Shortall
Penrith Panthers	16-24	Parramatta Eels	13 September 2008, 6:15pm	Brookvale Oval	Phillip Haines
New Zealand Warriors	47-20	St. George Illawarra	14 September 2008, 1:45pm	Olympic Park	Chris James
Semi-finals
New Zealand Warriors	38-4	Penrith Panthers	19 September 2008, 6:15pm	Mt Smart Stadium	Phillip Haines
Parramatta Eels	22-23	St. George Illawarra	20 September 2008, 5:30pm	Suncorp Stadium	Chris James
Preliminary Finals
Canberra Raiders	18-14	St. George Illawarra	26 September 2008, 5:30pm	Sydney Football Stadium	Phillip Haines
Brisbane Broncos	28-26	New Zealand Warriors	27 September 2008, 5:30pm	Sydney Football Stadium	Chris James
Grand Final
Canberra Raiders	28-24	Brisbane Broncos	5 October 2008, 2:15pm	ANZ Stadium	Shayne Hayne

== Grand final ==
Canberra Raiders	Position	Brisbane Broncos
1. Josh Dugan	FB	1. Josh Hoffman
2. Drury Low	WG	2. Mitch Rivett
3. Jarrod Croker	CE	3. Will Tupou
4. Daniel Vidot	CE	4. Brendon Gibb
5. Michael Brophy	WG	5. Jharal Yow Yeh
6. Michael Picker	FE	6. Jared Kahu
7. Matt Smith	HB	7. Ben Hunt
15. Andrew Edwards	PR	8. Josh McGuire
9. Travis Waddell	HK	9. Andrew McCullough
10. Nick Skinner	PR	10. Mitchell Dodds
11. Jarrad Kennedy	SR	11. Matt Handcock
12. Zach Merritt	SR	12. Troyden Watene
13. Shaun Fensom (c)	LK	13. Alex Glenn (c)
14. Brock Dunn	Bench	14. Michael Spence
16. Justin Carney	Bench	15. Dunamis Lui
17. Todd Rheinberger	Bench	16. Guy Ford
18. Levi Freeman	Bench	17. Tom Butterfield
Tony Adam	Coach	Anthony Griffin

Canberra defeated Brisbane 28–24 in the U20 rugby league grand final at ANZ Stadium. Second-rower Jarrad Kennedy scored the winning try seven minutes into golden-point extra time.

Kennedy was mobbed by jubilant Raiders teammates after collapsing over the line in exhaustion after willing himself to back up centre Jarrod Croker, who had collected a cross-field kick from halfback Matt Smith as the clock wound down.

Canberra won the hard way, though, recovering from 20-12 down early in the second half and then needing a missed conversion attempt from Broncos halfback Ben Hunt to force extra time.

Gunning for their eighth straight victory, Brisbane made a worrying start, conceding a soft try to five-eighth Michael Picker, which fullback Josh Dugan converted for a 6-0 lead after 10 minutes.

The Broncos steadied and went to the interval with a 16-12 buffer after tries to Hunt, interchange forward Michael Spence and winger Jharal Yow Yeh.

The Broncos looked set to go on with the job when centre Brendon Gibb crossed out wide in the opening minutes of the second half, but the Raiders refused to lie down.

A second try to Michael Picker and a goose-stepping four-pointer to winger Drury Low, plus Dugan's heroics, eventually set the scene for Kennedy's match-winning play.

=== Match Summary ===
2008 Toyota Cup Grand Final

Sunday, 5 October
14:15pm AEDT (UTC+11)

Canberra Raiders	28 – 24	Brisbane Broncos
Tries: 5 Picker 10', 26'; Low 53'; Dugan 66'; Kennedy 88'; Goals: 4 Dugan 11', 27', 55', 67' (4/4)	1st: 12–16; 2nd: 12–8; GP: 4–0	Tries: 5 Yow Yeh 44', 68'; Hunt 17'; Spence 29'; Gibb 39'; Goals: 2 Hunt 18', 30' (2/5)

ANZ Stadium, Sydney
Referee: Shayne Hayne
Jack Gibson Medal: Josh Dugan (Canberra)

== Statistics ==
=== Top Pointscorers ===
	Player	Team	P	T	G	FG	Pts
1	Ben Barba	Bulldogs	20	28	70	2	254
2	Kevin Locke	New Zealand	24	15	88	-	236
3	Josh Dugan	Canberra	19	15	83	-	226
4	Ben Hunt	Brisbane	26	17	49	-	166
5	Lachlan Coote	Penrith	12	15	39	-	138
6	Nathan Gardner	Parramatta	16	18	32	-	136
7	Jordan Kahu	Brisbane	22	5	52	-	124
8	Eddie Paea	South Sydney	19	11	38	2	122
9	Chris Sandow	South Sydney	11	6	47	-	118
10	Daly Cherry-Evans	Manly	24	7	41	3	113

=== Top Tryscorers ===
	Player	Team	P	T
1	Ben Barba	Bulldogs	20	28
2	Jharal Yow Yeh	Brisbane	26	27
3	Kevin Gordon	Gold Coast	20	20
4	Nathan Gardner	Parramatta	16	18
5	Ben Hunt	Brisbane	26	17
6	Drury Low	Canberra	16	16
7	Lachlan Coote	Penrith	12	15
7	Coedi Towney	Wests Tigers	17	15
7	Simon Williams	Newcastle	17	15
7	John Kennedy	St George Illawarra	23	15
7	Kevin Locke	New Zealand	24	15

== Awards ==
=== Toyota Cup Player of the Year ===
The winner of the award is decided by the most votes during the year as decided by the referee of each game on a 3-2-1 basis for each game played throughout the regular season.

Winner:

Ben Hunt, Brisbane

Nominated:

Ben Barba, Bulldogs
Eddie Paea, South Sydney
Matt Mundine, St. George Illawarra

=== Toyota Cup team of the Year ===
The Toyota Cup team of the Year is voted on by the 16 Toyota Cup coaches, with the players with the highest votes in each position selected.

Position	Player	Club
FB	Lachlan Coote	Penrith
WG	Jharal Yow Yeh	Brisbane
CE	Justin Carney	Canberra
CE	Tony Williams	Parramatta
WG	Kevin Gordon	Gold Coast
FE	Ben Barba	Bulldogs
HB	Chris Sandow	South Sydney
PR	Russell Packer	New Zealand
HK	Masada Iosefa	Penrith
PR	John Kite	Bulldogs
SR	Joel Thompson	Canberra
SR	Daniel Harrison	Bulldogs
LK	Shaun Fensom	Canberra
Bench	Ben Hunt	Brisbane
Bench	Matt Mundine	St George Illawarra
Bench	Jordan Rapana	Gold Coast
Bench	Ben Matulino	New Zealand
