= Ben Hunt =

Australian international rugby league footballer

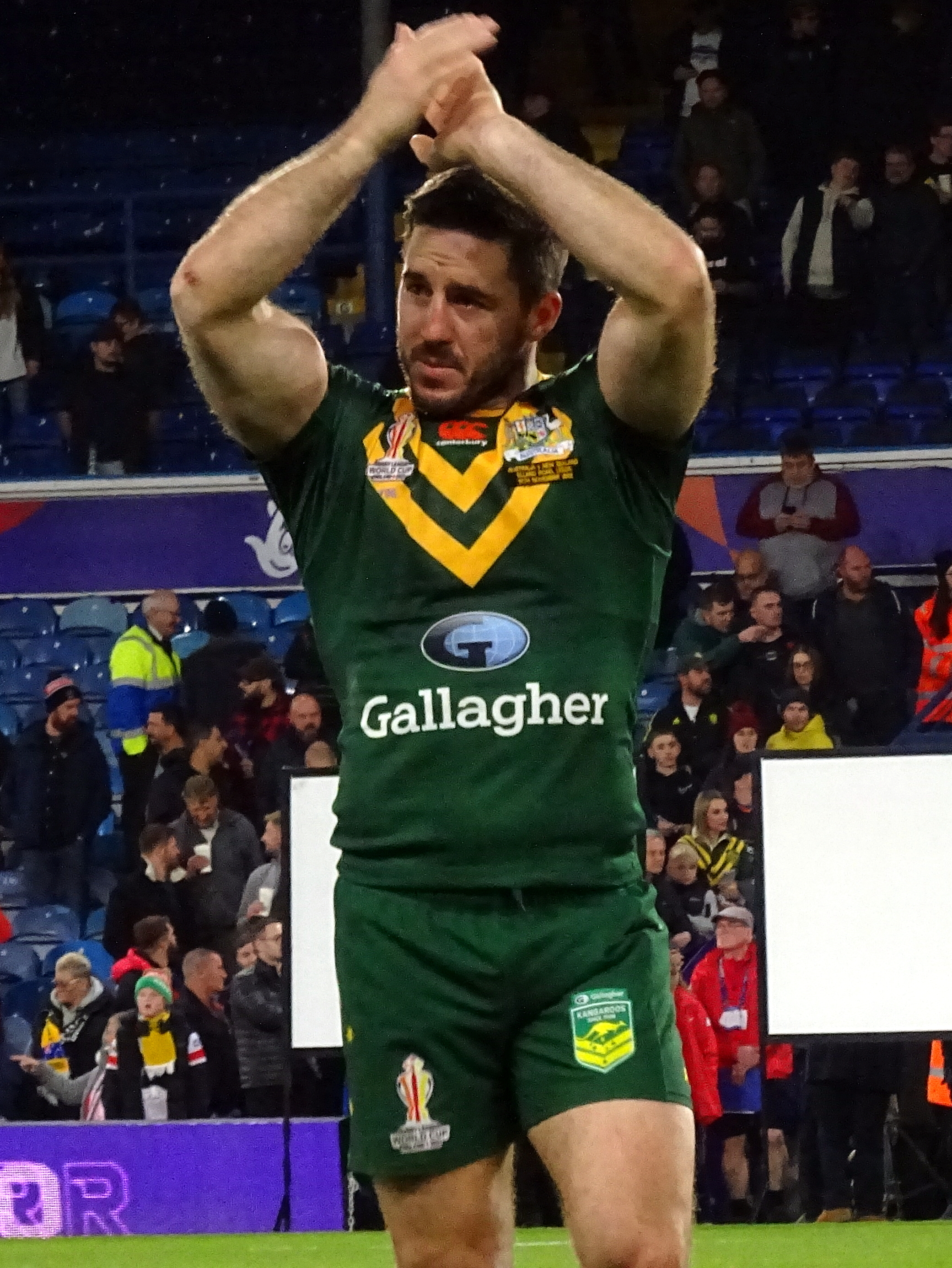

Personal information
- Full name: Benjamin Hunt
- Born: 27 March 1990 (age 36) Rockhampton, Queensland, Australia
- Height: 178 cm (5 ft 10 in)
- Weight: 88 kg (13 st 12 lb)

Playing information
- Position: Halfback, Hooker, Five-eighth
Club
Years	Team	Pld	T	G	FG	P
2009–17	Brisbane Broncos	187	45	25	0	230
2018–24	St. George Illawarra	147	39	5	1	167
2025–	Brisbane Broncos	39	4	1	1	19
	Total	373	88	31	2	416
Representative
Years	Team	Pld	T	G	FG	P
2014–23	Australia	15	4	0	0	16
2017–24	Queensland	20	5	0	0	20
2014–23	Prime Minister's XIII	5	0	3	0	6
2019	Australia 9s	5	0	0	0	0
- Source: As of 20 November 2026

Benjamin Hunt (born 27 March 1990) is an Australian professional rugby league footballer who plays as a mix of hooker, five-eighth and halfback for the Brisbane Broncos in the National Rugby League, with whom he won the 2025 NRL Grand Final. He has also represented the Queensland Maroons at State of Origin level and Australia at international test level.

He commenced his first-grade career as a halfback at the Brisbane Broncos in 2009, before moving to St. George Illawarra in 2018, and returning to the Broncos in 2025. Hunt played for Australia at international level as a hooker and bench utility from 2014 to 2023, winning the 2022 Rugby League World Cup Final, Hunt was also in Australia's title-winning inaugural 9's side in 2019. Hunt played for the Prime Ministers XIII on five occasions from 2014 to 2023.

== Background ==
Hunt was born in Rockhampton, Queensland, Australia. He grew up in Dingo, playing junior rugby league with the Blackwater Crushers, in Blackwater before attending St. Brendan's College in Yeppoon.

Ben Hunt is married to Bridget Hunt (née Hagan), an accredited dietitian. The couple tied the knot in 2017 in a ceremony attended by many NRL figures. They are parents to two children, Brady and Bowie.

Hunt's father Geoff played for Central Queensland during the mid-80s. Like his son after him, Geoff Hunt was a halfback, who played against the touring Great Britain Lions in 1984.

Despite growing up in Queensland, Hunt is a self-proclaimed Cronulla-Sutherland Sharks fan. As a youngster he idolised Mat Rogers which was the reason he supported the Sharks. Hunt has also cited Andrew Johns as the player who most influenced his game. Hunt's brother-in-law is his former Brisbane Broncos teammate and former North Queensland Cowboys hooker Jake Granville, with Granville being married to Hunt's sister, Zoe. Hunt's wife, Bridget, is the niece of former Queensland player and coach Michael Hagan.

== Playing career ==
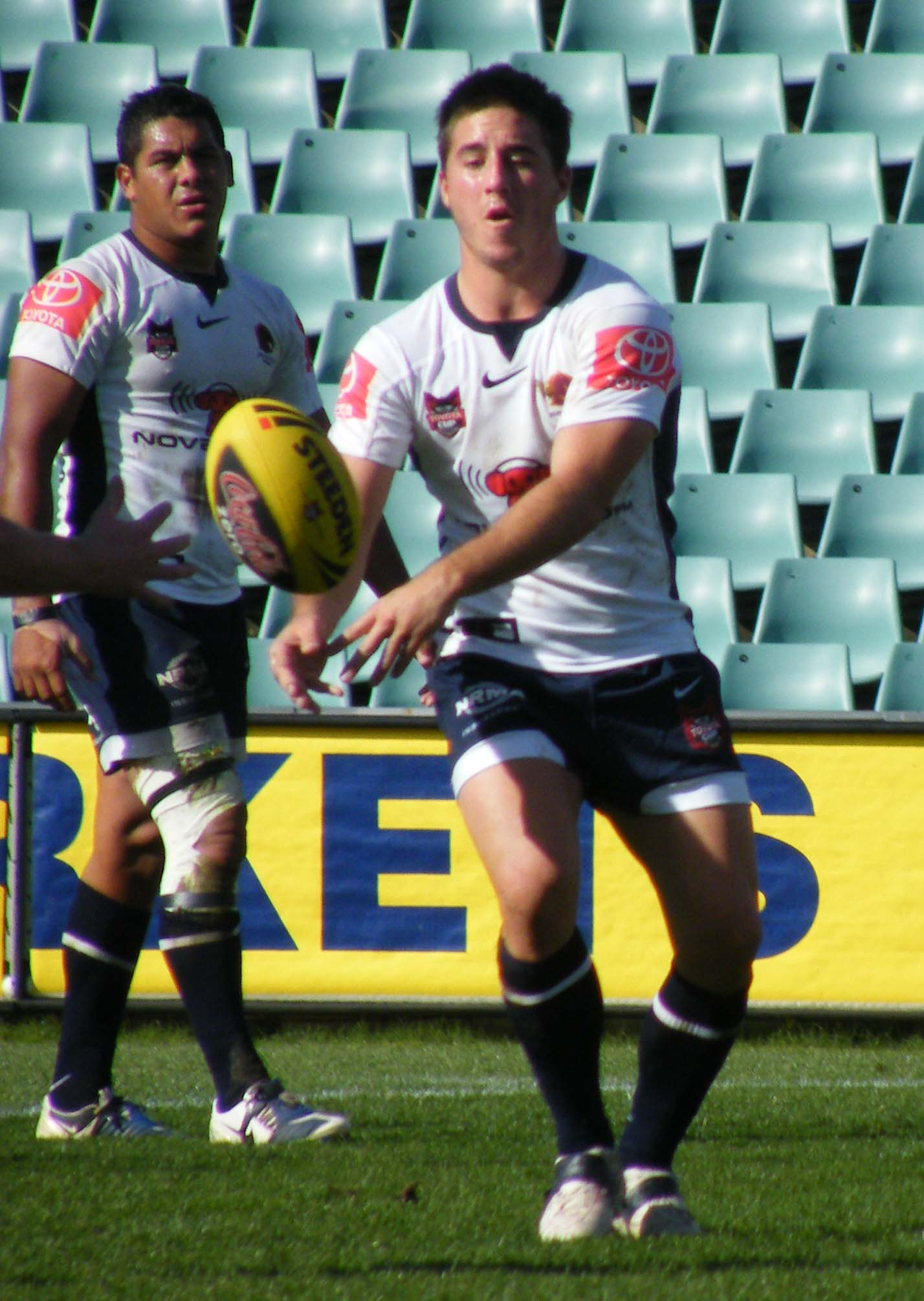
Hunt playing for the Broncos in 2009

Hunt signed with the Brisbane Broncos as a youth player as a Hooker. In 2008, Hunt won the inaugural 2008 Toyota Cup (Under-20s) player of the year award and was also named in the team of the year, on the interchange bench. Hunt played halfback in the 2008 Toyota Cup Grand Final. Hunt played 45 games, scored 27 tries and kicked 93 goals for 294 points in his U20s career from 2008 to 2009.

=== 2009 ===
In round 15 of the 2009 NRL season, Hunt made his NRL debut with the Brisbane Broncos at halfback in a 12–46 loss to the Cronulla-Sutherland Sharks at Remondis Stadium. Hunt went on to play one more match that season, in round 20 against the Gold Coast Titans in a 14–34 loss at Robina Stadium.

=== 2010 ===
In round 8, against the Newcastle Knights, Hunt scored his first NRL career try in Brisbane's 22–30 loss at Suncorp Stadium. The 2010 NRL season was seen as a breakthrough season for Hunt, as he played in 20 matches. After some impressive performances, that included scoring two tries, many were calling for Hunt to get a run as a starting hooker. Although Hunt stayed as a bench player, he demonstrated that he could be Brisbane's future halfback.

=== 2011 ===
After a shaky start to 2011, Hunt regained his form with an impressive performance against the Canberra Raiders in the Brisbane clubs 20–4 win at Canberra Stadium in round 2. After showing solid form off the bench, Hunt broke his finger in a round 9 clash against the Melbourne Storm, Hunt made his return in round 17 against the Parramatta Eels but was then stood down for a week with teammate Andrew McCullough after being charged with public nuisance following a night of drinking in the Brisbane CBD. Hunt later returned in round 19 in the Brisbane sides 30–10 win against the Gold Coast at Suncorp Stadium. Hunt went on to play in 19 matches and score a try for the Brisbane club in the 2011 NRL season.

=== 2012 ===
After the retirement of Brisbane captain Darren Lockyer, Hunt was nominated alongside teammate Corey Norman to fill the vacant five-eighth position. The pair battled out in the trials but Hunt eventually lost out to Norman, leaving Hunt on the bench for round 1. In round 7, against the Canberra Raiders, Hunt and Norman both got the chance to showcase their skills on the centre stage with regular halfback Peter Wallace a late withdrawal through injury. Norman and Hunt didn't disappoint with the pair combining beautifully as the Brisbane side ran out 30–6 winners at Suncorp Stadium. After the Broncos stumbled at the back end of 2012, losing 7 of 10 games en route to the finals, Hunt found himself in the five-eighth role with Norman dropped to the bench following poor form. Hunt found himself back on the bench as the Brisbane club were knocked out in the first week of the finals losing 33–16 against the North Queensland Cowboys. Over the course of the season, Hunt played in all 25 matches and scored a try.

=== 2013 ===
Hunt continued his bench role for the start of the 2013 NRL season as Brisbane made a shaky start. He got his first opportunity in his preferred halfback role in the round 9 clash against Parramatta, as Scott Prince suffered an injury in the opening minutes of the game. On 14 May, Hunt signed a new two-year deal with the Brisbane side. Towards the back end of the season, Hunt secured the halfback position after Peter Wallace was benched and Corey Norman was dumped to the Queensland Cup for the rest of the year, scoring a try in his first game. He played in 23 matches and scored two tries in 2013.

=== 2014 ===
In February 2014, Hunt was selected in the Broncos runners-up 2014 Auckland Nines squad. In June 2014, Hunt was named in the Queensland Maroons 22-man squad for game 2 as cover for halfback Daly Cherry-Evans, but Cherry-Evans recovered in time for the game, sending Hunt back to Brisbane. Hunt had an excellent season for the club, being one of the top contenders for the Dally M, finishing fourth in the votes and getting a pay rise to $450,000 a season. Hunt finished off the 2014 NRL season with playing in all of Brisbane's 25 matches, scoring 13 tries and kicking 21 goals.

On 14 October 2014, Hunt was selected for the Australia 2014 Four Nations 24-man squad. Hunt made his international debut for Australia against England at AAMI Park, coming off the interchange bench and scoring a try just after a couple of minutes of coming onto the field in Australia's 16–12 win. Hunt played off the interchange bench and scored a try in the Kangaroos 18-22 Four Nations final loss over New Zealand at Westpac Stadium. On 1 October 2014, Hunt re-signed with the Broncos until the end of the 2017 season.

=== 2015 ===
In round 6, against the Sydney Roosters, Hunt scored 2 tries, one of them in golden point extra time, to win the match for Brisbane 22–18. In round 25, against the South Sydney Rabbitohs, Hunt scored his first NRL hat trick of tries in the 47–12 win at the Sydney Football Stadium. On 4 October 2015, in the 2015 NRL Grand Final against the North Queensland Cowboys, Hunt played at halfback in the Brisbane's historic golden point 16–17 loss. Hunt was heavily talked about after the match after a horror last three minutes, first being penalized for a lifting tackle on North Queensland centre Kane Linnett which resulting in Hunt being placed on report for the tackle. In Brisbane's last set with ball in the match, Hunt got his hands on the ball 44 metres out from Brisbane's line, but a loose carry resulted in a one-on-one strip from Kyle Feldt, who shortly after scored the try in the corner to tie up the match at 16-all. Four seconds into extra time, with the ball spiralling in the air, Hunt set himself underneath the ball but knocked on, which gave North Queensland the opportunity to win the match when their captain, Johnathan Thurston, kicked the winning field goal. Hunt played in 26 matches, scoring 12 tries and kicking 4 goals.

=== 2016 ===
On 12 January, Hunt was selected in the QAS Emerging Maroons squad. On 4 February, Hunt, along with eight other members of the Queensland Emerging squad, was banned from Queensland State of Origin selection for 12 months after breaking team curfew. In round 10, against the Manly-Warringah Sea Eagles, Hunt played his 150th NRL match in Brisbane's 30–6 win at Suncorp Stadium. Hunt managed still to play in all of Brisbane's 26 matches and score 7 tries. Hunt was added to the Australian Kangaroos 2016 Four Nations train-on squad but later failed to make the final 24-man squad.

=== 2017 ===
On 23 January, after much speculation on Hunt's future at the Brisbane club, with the Parramatta Eels and St. George Illawarra Dragons interested in signing him from the 2018 season onward, Hunt agreed to sign a multimillion-dollar five-year contract with the St. George starting in 2018. After starting the season well for Brisbane, in Round 6 against the Sydney Roosters, Hunt sustained a hamstring injury while performing a try-saving tackle on Roosters centre Latrell Mitchell, and was sidelined for 6 weeks. On 8 June, after the Brisbane's lost back-to-back matches after Hunt's return to the squad, Hunt was dropped to the Queensland Cup to play for the Ipswich Jets by coach Wayne Bennett. Bennett preferred Kodi Nikorima after he showed strong performances during Hunt's absence, resulting in 6 straight wins. A month following Hunt's shock dropping, he was selected on the bench for Queensland for Game 3 of the State of Origin Series due to injuries to Darius Boyd and Johnathan Thurston in Game 2. Queensland won the series by defeating New South Wales 22–6. Hunt finished his last year with the Broncos with 21 matches and 7 tries. Hunt was selected in the 24-man Australia Kangaroos 2017 Rugby League World Cup squad. Hunt only played in 1 match in the tournament which was playing off the interchange bench in the Kangaroos 34–0 win over Lebanon at Sydney Football Stadium.

=== 2018 ===
On 28 January, reports came out about Hunt and Cameron Munster being involved in a punch-up in a night out in Darwin during the Kangaroos 2017 World Cup campaign after the 46-0 smashing victory over Samoa. The pair did not take part in the match beforehand and Munster was reportedly sent home from the squad. In Round 1 of the 2018 NRL season, Hunt made his club debut for the St. George Illawarra Dragons against his former team the Brisbane Broncos, starting at halfback where he was running riot against his old teammates and scored a try under the posts by intercepting a wayward pass from Brisbane prop Matthew Lodge in the Dragons' 34–12 victory at Jubilee Oval.

On 28 May, Hunt was named as halfback to represent the Queensland Maroons in the 2018 State of Origin series. He was named in the side after brilliant form for his NRL club the St. George Illawarra Dragons and he was a major factor in St. George's sublime start to the season in which they won their first 6 games. Hunt was replaced as halfback by Cherry-Evans during State of Origin III, during the match he was allocated to sit on the bench as Cherry-Evans took his place. Hunt was part of the St. George Illawarra side which qualified for the finals for the first time since 2015 finishing 7th on the table at the end of the regular season. In week one, St. George Illawarra defeated Brisbane 48–18 in a shock victory at Suncorp Stadium with Hunt starring for the saints. The following week against Souths, Hunt scored a try but was heavily criticised after the match as Souths won 13–12. This was in relation to the final minute of the match with the scores locked at 12–12 as instead of kicking the ball downfield, Hunt elected to run the ball on the final tackle which handed possession over to Souths in good field position and ended with Adam Reynolds kicking the winning field goal. After the match, Hunt told the media "It was a pretty big error by me, to be honest". Parramatta legend Peter Sterling labelled it the "dumbest play of the year" the following day on Nine's Sunday Footy Show.

=== 2019 ===
In Round 5 against Canterbury-Bankstown, Hunt scored two tries as St. George Illawarra won the match 40–4 at Kogarah Oval. Hunt was later selected for Queensland in the 2019 State of Origin series and played in all 3 games as Queensland lost the series 2–1. In the wake of St. George Illawarra's Round 18 loss against Penrith which ended in a 40–18 defeat, coach Paul McGregor came under intense criticism after he elected to rest Hunt from playing citing player welfare.

In round 25 against the Gold Coast, Hunt scored 2 tries as St. George Illawarra won the match 24–16 in the final game of the season as the club finished a disappointing 15th on the table.

On 30 September, Hunt was named at hooker in the Australia PM XIII side. On 7 October, Hunt was named in the Australian side for the 2019 Rugby League World Cup 9s and the upcoming Oceania Cup fixtures.

=== 2020 ===
He made a total of 19 appearances for St. George Illawarra in the 2020 NRL season as the side finished a disappointing 13th on the table.

=== 2021 ===
In round 2 of the 2021 NRL season, Hunt put in a man of the match performance as St. George Illawarra defeated North Queensland 25–18 at the Queensland Country Bank Stadium. Hunt was later selected as the reserve player for Queensland in Game 1 of the 2021 State of Origin series. Hunt scored two tries in the third game to help prevent a clean sweep of the series and received the title of 'man of the match' for his performance.

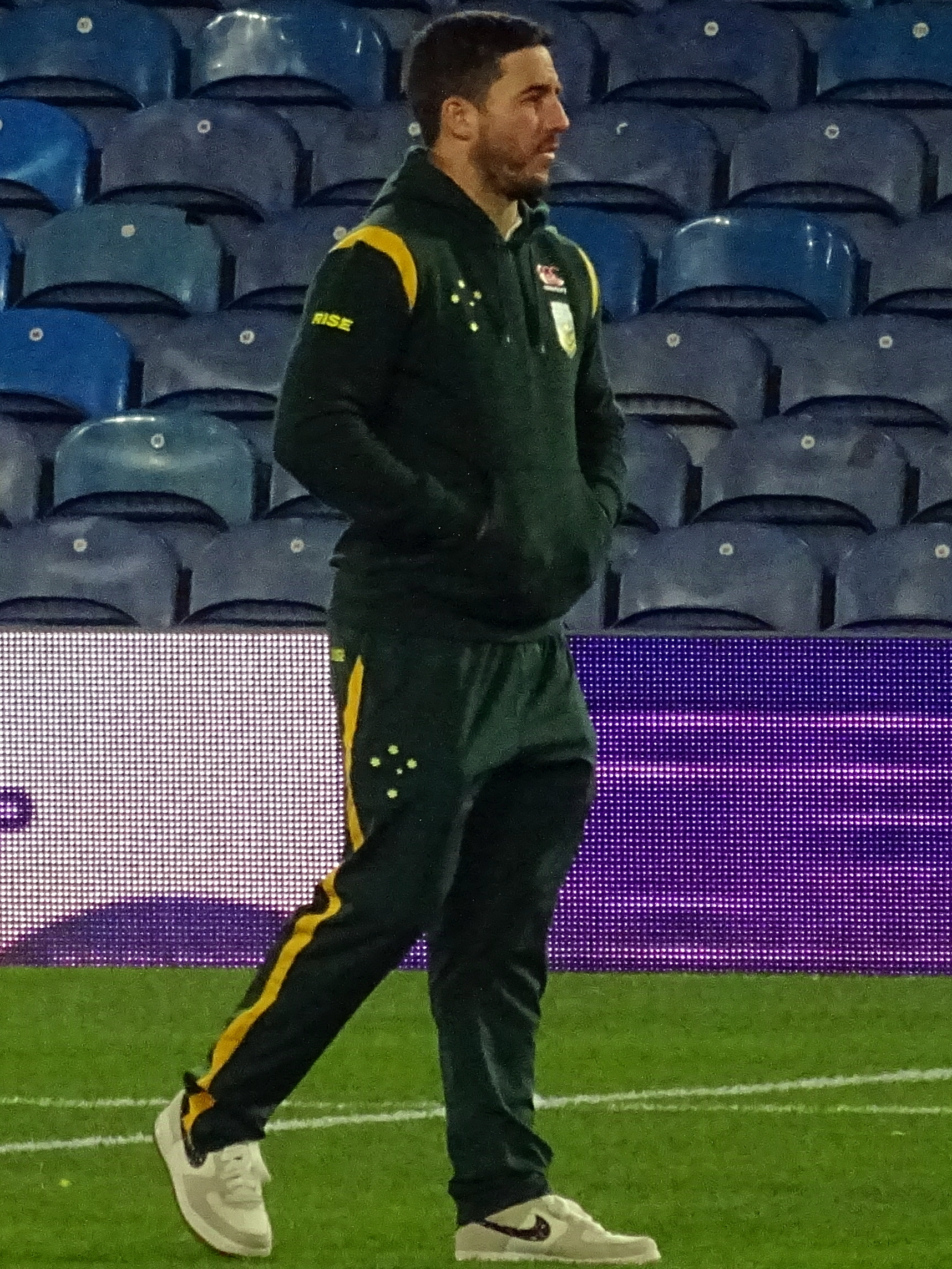
Hunt pre-match for Australia at the 2021 RLWC

On 2 August, it was announced that Hunt would miss at least four matches after breaking his arm in the club's 50–14 loss against South Sydney.

=== 2022 ===
Hunt captained St. George Illawarra for the second year, receiving praise for his consistent performances to start the season. This included leading his side to a Round 7 victory against the Sydney Roosters on ANZAC Day. For his efforts, Hunt earned the Ashton Collier Spirit of Anzac Medal and received the title of 'man of the match'. As a result of his excellent start to the season, Hunt was named as starting hooker in the 2022 State of Origin series and was placed at the top of the Dally M medal leaderboard as of Round 12 of the 2022 season. Hunt scored the final try in the third game, thereby securing the win for the Queensland Maroons. In round 19 of the 2022 NRL season, Hunt scored two tries for St. George Illawarra in a 20–6 victory over Manly.

Hunt placed third in the overall Dally M leaderboard for the year and was selected for the Australia national rugby league team following the end of the regular NRL season. He also received the Dragons Player of the Year medal for the second consecutive season, acknowledging his stellar 2022

On 6 October, Hunt signed a two-year contract extension to remain at St. George Illawarra until the end of 2025. Hunt was later voted as the clubs player of the season at the St. George Illawarra awards night.

Hunt was selected by Australia for the 2021 Rugby League World Cup. Hunt played for Australia in their 2021 Rugby League World Cup final victory over Samoa.

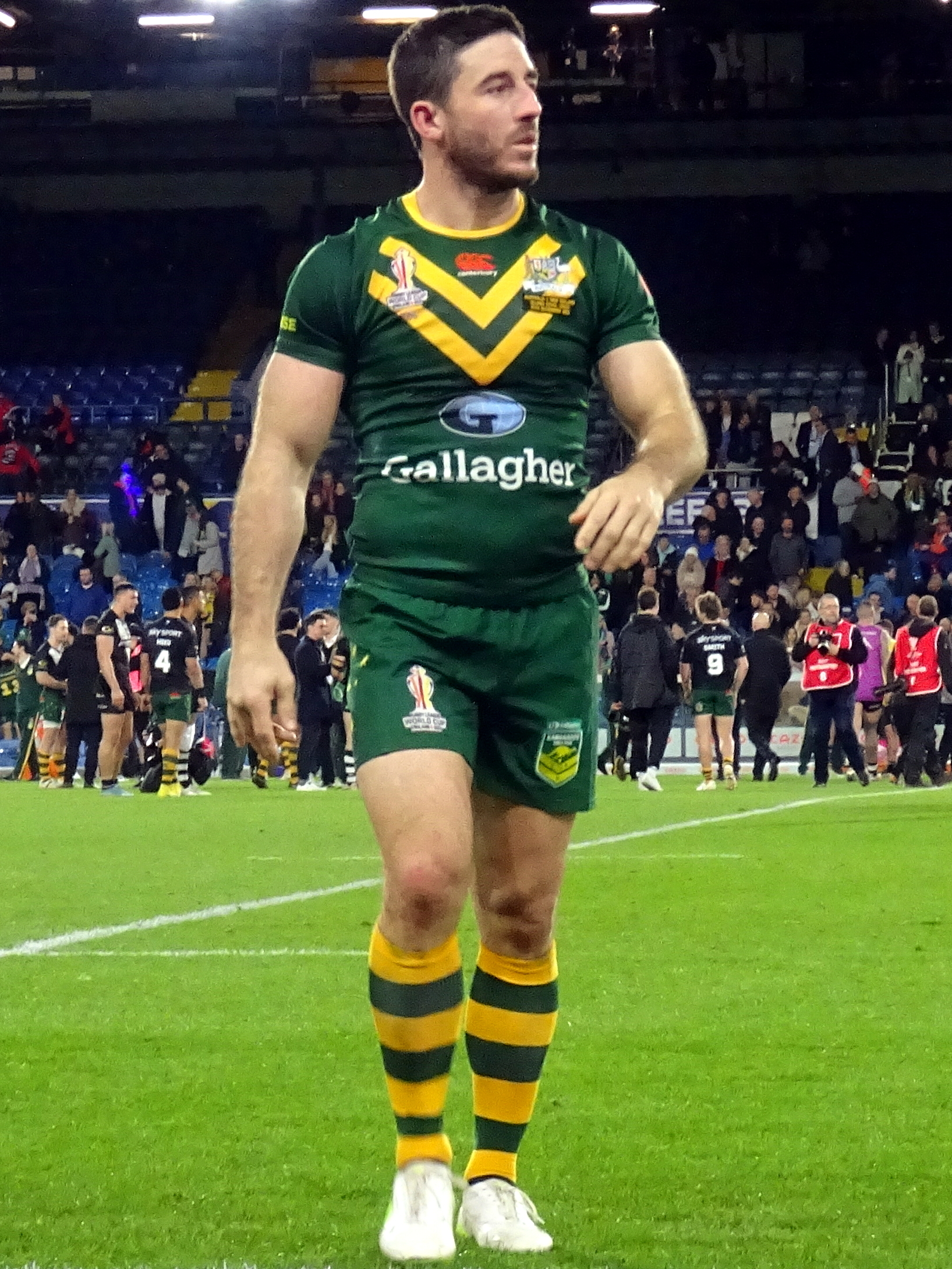
Hunt post-match for the Kangaroos in 2022

=== 2023 ===
In round 11 of the 2023 NRL season, Hunt played his 300th first grade game in St. George Illawarra's 42–22 loss against North Queensland. On 22 May, Hunt was selected by Queensland for game one of the 2023 State of Origin series. In June, Hunt requested an immediate release from his St. George Illawarra contract. It was reported that Hunt, became unhappy after head coach, Anthony Griffin, was sacked by the club. On 26 June, Hunt's request to be released by St. George Illawarra was denied by the club. Hunt would play a total of 22 games for the club in the 2023 NRL season as they finished 16th on the table.

=== 2024 ===
In May, Hunt was selected by Queensland for the 2024 State of Origin series. In game one, Hunt scored two tries in Queensland's 38–10 victory over New South Wales. Hunt played 22 games for St. George Illawarra in the 2024 NRL season as the club finished 11th on the table. On 30 October, Hunt was released from the final year of his contract with the club. St. George Illawarra CEO Ryan Webb said in a statement to the media ""This decision was not easy and was not taken lightly, but we need to do what is best for the club at this time, after extensive discussions with Ben and his management, it became clear that this is the best path forward for both parties. It allows the club to openly explore the player market and focus on the future. Ben has been an important part of our club and we are grateful for his contributions. We wish him and his family all the best in their next chapter". On 26 November, it was announced that Hunt had agreed to terms to return to the Brisbane Broncos on a two-year deal. Hunt said during his re-signing with Brisbane, the entire seven years he was away from the club he had watched every single game that they had played.

=== 2025 ===
In round 25 of the 2025 NRL season, Hunt played his 350th first grade game in Brisbane's 46–12 win over the struggling Newcastle side. The following day, Hunt did a 1-1 interview with Channel 9 where he disclosed that he fell out of love with rugby league during his time at St. George Illawarra and stated that he felt let down by the club at times. Hunt also disclosed that he regretted leaving Brisbane in the first place to sign with the club. In the 2025 qualifying final, Hunt kicked the winning field goal in golden point extra-time as Brisbane defeated Canberra 29–28. The match was described as one of the greatest finals matches in recent memory.

Hunt played as the starting five-eighth in Brisbane's 26–22 victory in the 2025 NRL Grand Final, shifting to hooker when Ezra Mam came onto the field with Cory Paix off the field and eventually halfback after Adam Reynolds had to come off due to a calf injury. Unfortunately, Hunt had to come off the field himself as he sustained a Category 1 HIA in the 71st minute after being knocked in the head by the knee of Melbourne player Ativalu Lisati during an attempted tackle.

You know, I went through some pretty tough times in the years following that and- there was periods where I wanted to give up the game. Yeah, it was some really dark times but now I can look back on it and say that I've been able to get through that adversity...

— Hunt talking about the aftermath of his ball drop incident in the 2015 NRL Grand Final, 13 August 2024

Hunt was talked about extensively by the media and fans leading up to the grand final, seeing as it was his first grand final appearance since the horror 2015 NRL Grand Final loss ten years prior. At the age of 35, Hunt saw to redeem himself for the infamous ball drop incident that he had become well known for, and come away with his first ever premiership after a decorated 16 year long rugby league career.

Hunt received loud cheers following the match at Accor Stadium, and was widely celebrated across the NRL community for finally being able to put the 2015 loss to bed. Melbourne Storm captain Harry Grant acknowledged Hunt in his concession speech stating "If there's one bloke that deserves it, it's probably Ben Hunt. So congrats Dozer and the Broncos." and Brisbane captain Adam Reynolds stated "No one deserves it more, to see how hard he works. I mean, he’s copped all sorts of criticism over the past couple of years and definitely doesn’t deserve it."

=== 2026 ===
On 19 February, Hunt played in Brisbane's World Club Challenge loss against Hull Kingston Rovers. On 22 June 2026, Brisbane announced that Hunt re-signed with the club for a further year. Hunt played 17 games for Brisbane in the 2026 NRL season as the club finished 14th on the table.

== Statistics and Honours ==
Season	Team	Pld	T	G	FG	P
2009	Brisbane Broncos	2	-	-	-	0
2010	Brisbane Broncos	20	2	-	-	8
2011	Brisbane Broncos	19	1	-	-	4
2012	Brisbane Broncos	25	1	-	-	4
2013	Brisbane Broncos	23	2	-	-	8
2014	Brisbane Broncos	25	14	21	-	94
2015	Brisbane Broncos	26	12	4	-	56
2016	Brisbane Broncos	26	7	-	-	28
2017	Brisbane Broncos	21	7	-	-	28
2018	St. George Illawarra Dragons	25	7	-	-	28
2019	St. George Illawarra Dragons	21	8	-	1	33
2020	St. George Illawarra Dragons	19	1	-	-	4
2021	St. George Illawarra Dragons	15	5	-	-	20
2022	St. George Illawarra Dragons	23	6	-	-	24
2023	St. George Illawarra Dragons	22	7	5	-	30
2024	St. George Illawarra Dragons	22	4	-	-	16
2025	Brisbane Broncos	21	2	1	1	11
2026	Brisbane Broncos	18	2			8
	Totals	373	88	33	2	416

*denotes season still competing

=== Honours ===
Individual

- Toyota Cup Player Of The Year: 2008
- Toyota Cup Team Of The Year: 2008
- Brisbane Broncos Player's Player: 2014
- Brisbane Broncos Player Of The Year: 2014
- Brisbane Broncos Best Back: 2014, 2015
- Ron McAuliffe Medal: 2019, 2021
- St. George Illawarra Dragons Player Of The Year: 2021, 2022
- Ashton-Collier Medal: 2022
- Brisbane Broncos Play Of The Year: 2025 (GP Field Goal VS Raiders Finals Week 1)

Club

- Toyota Cup Grand Finalist: 2008
- NRL Pre-Season Challenge Winner: 2025
- NRL Grand Finalist: 2015, 2025
- NRL Premiership: 2025

Representative

- PM's XIII Test Champion: 2014, 2018, 2019, 2022, 2023
- State Of Origin Series Winner: 2017, 2020, 2022, 2023
- Pacific Championship Winner: 2019
- Rugby League 9s World Cup Champion: 2019
- Rugby League World Cup Champion: 2021
