= Joe Picker =

Australian rugby league footballer

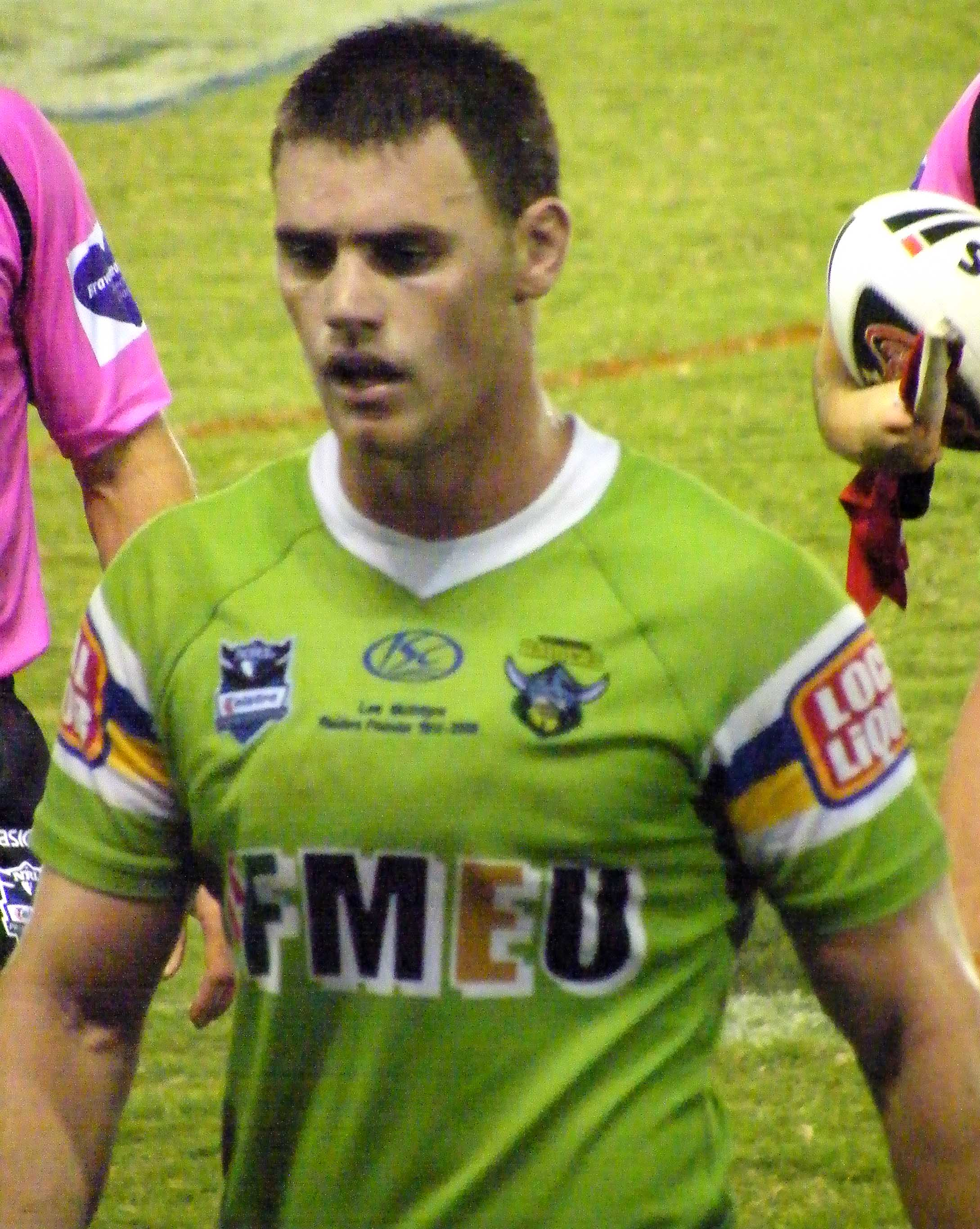

Personal information
- Full name: Joe Picker
- Born: 7 December 1987 (age 38) Crookwell, New South Wales, Australia

Playing information
- Height: 189 cm (6 ft 2 in)
- Weight: 101 kg (15 st 13 lb)
- Position: Second-row, Lock
Club
Years	Team	Pld	T	G	FG	P
2007–13	Canberra Raiders	110	20	0	0	80
2014	South Sydney	11	1	0	0	4
	Total	121	21	0	0	84
Representative
Years	Team	Pld	T	G	FG	P
2008	Prime Minister's XIII	1	1	0	0	4
- Relatives: Michael Picker (brother)

Joe Picker (born 7 December 1987) is an Australian former professional rugby league footballer from Crookwell, New South Wales. He previously played for the Canberra Raiders and South Sydney Rabbitohs in the National Rugby League. Picker has represented the Prime Minister's XIII and Australian Schoolboys. Picker's position was in the second-row. Picker was a part of the South Sydney squad that won the 2014 NRL Premiership but did not play in any finals matches or the grand final itself.

== Professional playing career ==
=== Canberra Raiders ===
After a break-out season in 2008 picker was named on the bench in the Prime Minister's XIII and scored a try. Picker went on to play 110 times for the Canberra Raiders in the NRL.

=== South Sydney Rabbitohs ===
On 18 November 2013, Picker signed with the South Sydney Rabbitohs for the 2014 NRL season. Picker played his first match for South Sydney in the 2014 Charity Shield, scoring a try.

== Personal life ==
His younger brothers Michael Picker and Ben Picker both play for Canberra.
