= Sam Joe =

Australian rugby league footballer

Personal information
- Born: 16 April 1989 (age 36); Thursday Island, Torres Strait, Australia
- Height: 188 cm (6 ft 2 in)
- Weight: 101 kg (15 st 13 lb)

Playing information
- Position: Wing, Centre
Club
Years	Team	Pld	T	G	FG	P
2008	Melbourne Storm	2	0	0	0	0
- Source: Rugby League Project, NRL Stats As of 25 August 2008

Sam Joe (born 16 April 1989) is an Australian former professional rugby league footballer. He previously played for the Melbourne Storm in the National Rugby League. He primarily plays as a wing and centre.

== Early life ==
Sam Joe was born on Thursday Island, Torres Strait, Australia, he was educated at St. Brendan's College, Yeppoon.

Sam played his junior rugby league for the Gracemere Cubs. He was then signed by the Melbourne Storm.

== Career ==
In round 13 of the 2008 NRL season. Joe made his NRL debut for the Melbourne Storm against the Gold Coast.

He was named in the Papua New Guinea training squad for the 2008 Rugby League World Cup.

Joe played on the Melbourne Storm wing of the 2009 NRL Under-20s Grand Final victory over the Tigers. He was released by Melbourne before the start of the 2010 season, moving back to Queensland to work in the mines.
