= Jarrad Kennedy =

Australian rugby league footballer

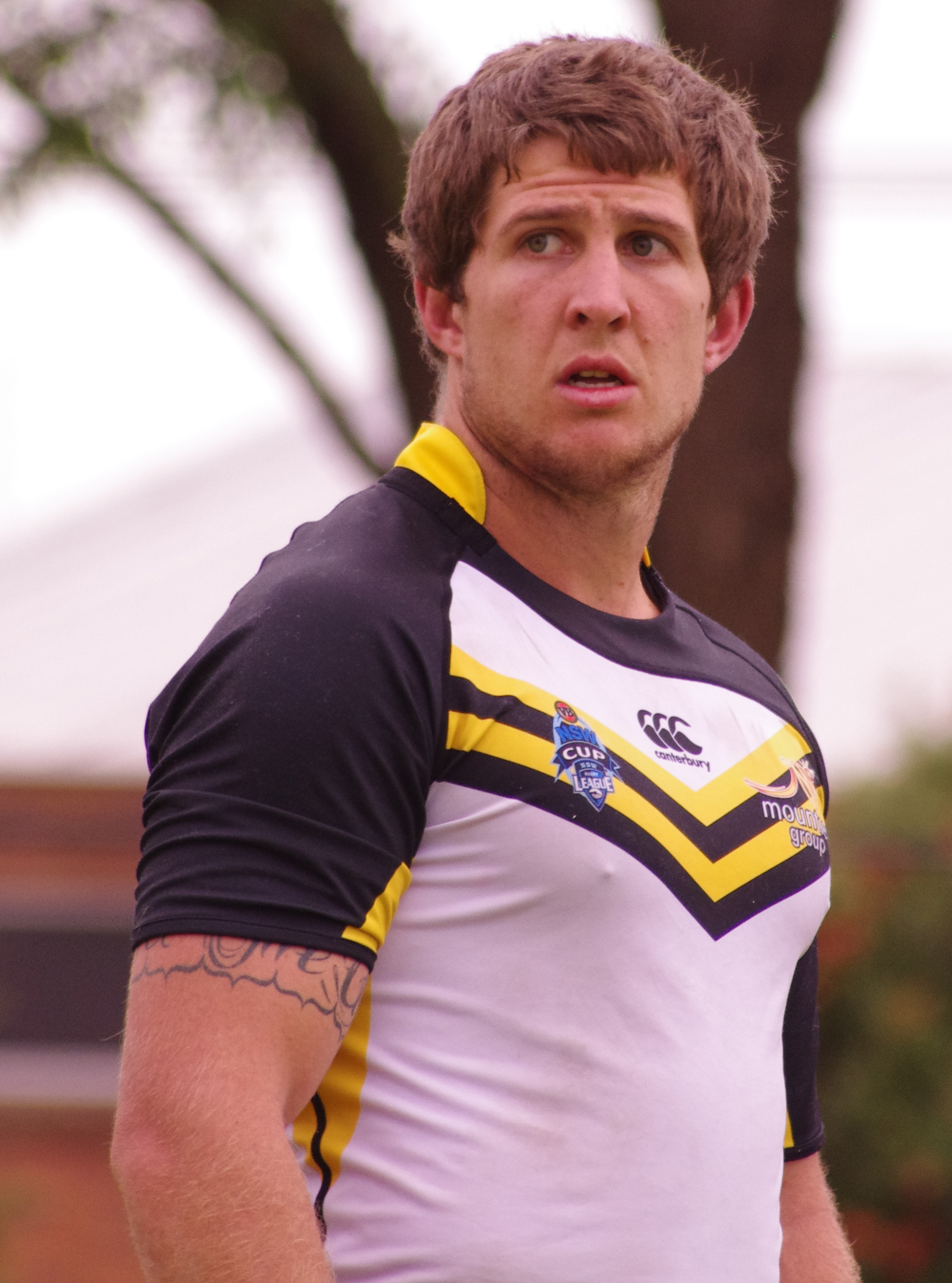

Personal information
- Born: 27 February 1989 (age 37) Moruya, New South Wales, Australia
- Height: 189 cm (6 ft 2 in)
- Weight: 104 kg (16 st 5 lb)

Playing information
- Position: Second-row, Lock, Centre
Club
Years	Team	Pld	T	G	FG	P
2012–16	Canberra Raiders	49	5	0	0	20
2017	Manly Sea Eagles	2	0	0	0	0
	Total	51	5	0	0	20
- Source: As of 3 December 2016

Jarrad Kennedy (born 27 February 1989) is an Australian professional rugby league footballer who plays for the Mount Pritchard Mounties in the Intrust Super Premiership. He plays at second-row, but can also fill in at centre. He previously played for the Canberra Raiders and the Manly-Warringah Sea Eagles in the National Rugby League.

== Background ==
Born in Moruya, New South Wales, Kennedy played his junior rugby league for the Tuross Lakers and Moruya-Tuross Sharks, before being signed by the Canberra Raiders.

== Playing career ==
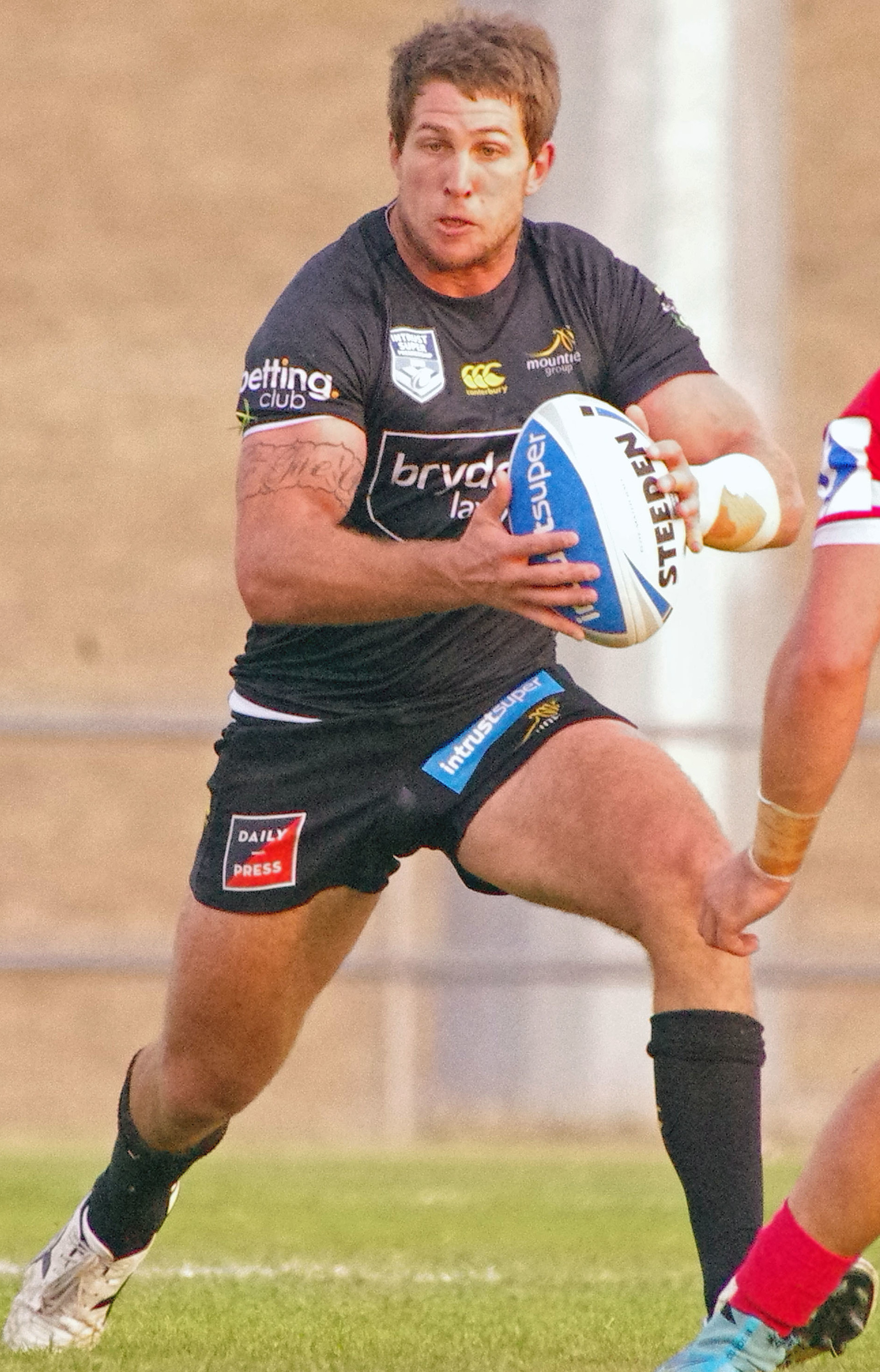
Kennedy playing for the Mount Pritchard Mounties in 2016

=== Early career ===
In 2008 and 2009, Kennedy played for the Canberra Raiders' NYC team. On 5 October 2008, Kennedy scored the match winning try in the Raiders' golden-point extra time win over the Brisbane Broncos in the 2008 NYC Grand Final. In 2010, he graduated on to the Raiders' Queensland Cup team, Souths Logan Magpies.

=== 2012 ===
In round 6 of the 2012 NRL season, Kennedy made his NRL debut for Canberra against the New Zealand Warriors.

=== 2013 ===
On 17 May, Kennedy re-signed with Canberra on a two-year contract.

=== 2014 ===
In round 11 of the 2014 NRL season, Kennedy scored his first NRL career try against North Queensland.

=== 2015 ===
On 25 March, Kennedy again re-signed with Canberra on a two-year contract.

=== 2016 ===
In September, Kennedy was named at second-row in the 2016 Intrust Super Premiership NSW Team of the Year.

=== 2017 ===
Kennedy was named in the Manly-Warringah squad for the 2017 NRL Auckland Nines. He made his debut for Manly against South Sydney in round 2 of the 2017 NRL season. At the end of 2017, Kennedy was released by the Manly club.

=== 2018 ===
In 2018, Kennedy re-joined Canberra but played the entire season for their feeder club Mounties making a total of ten appearances in the NSW Cup.

=== 2019 ===
In 2019, Kennedy joined the Tuggeranong Bushrangers in the local Canberra competition. On 31 October, Kennedy was named in the Blumers Lawyers CRC Team of the Year.
