= Clifford Manua =

New Zealand rugby league footballer

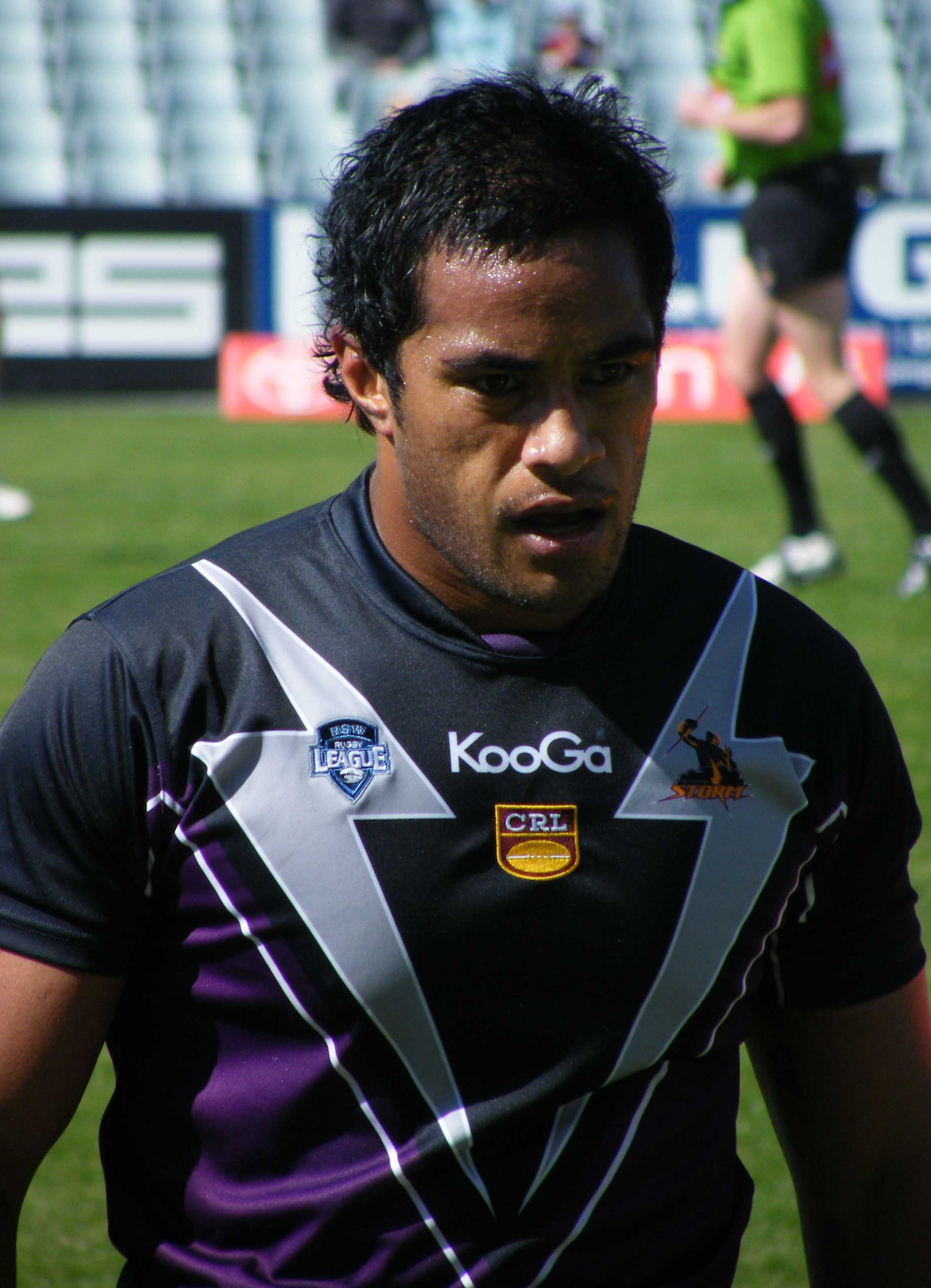

Personal information
- Full name: Clifford Manua
- Born: 12 September 1980 (age 45); Auckland, New Zealand

Playing information
- Height: 191 cm (6 ft 3 in)
- Weight: 118 kg (18 st 8 lb)
- Position: Prop, Second-row
Club
Years	Team	Pld	T	G	FG	P
2005	Cronulla Sharks	2	0	0	0	0
2007	Brisbane Broncos	4	0	0	0	0
2008	Melbourne Storm	4	0	0	0	0
	Total	10	0	0	0	0
Representative
Years	Team	Pld	T	G	FG	P
2007	Queensland Residents	1	0	0	0	0

Clifford Manua (born 12 September 1980) is a New Zealand former rugby league footballer who played for the Melbourne Storm in the National Rugby League. He played as a prop or second-row forward. He joined the Brisbane Broncos team in 2007, and played for their feeder club, the Aspley Broncos.

== Background ==
Manua was born in Auckland, New Zealand.

== Career ==
Manua made his first grade debut for Cronulla-Sutherland in round 24 of the 2005 NRL season against Manly-Warringah which ended in a 68–6 victory at Shark Park. Manua played in the club's elimination final loss against St. George during the same year.

In the 2007 NRL season, Manua joined Brisbane. He played four matches for the club including their 40-0 elimination final loss against Melbourne. He was released by Brisbane in late 2007, to join defending premiers Melbourne Storm as a backup for some of their injured forwards. Manua played a handful of games for Melbourne in the 2008 NRL season, the last of which was against the Gold Coast in round 13 with the match ending in a 18–0 defeat.

== Career highlights ==
- Junior Club: St Johns JRLFC
- Career Stats: 10 career games for Cronulla, Brisbane and Melbourne

Part of the Melbourne team that finished as 2008 NRL Grand Final runner-up.

Part of the Brisbane team that lost the 2007 World Club Challenge to St. Helens.
