= Michael Picker =

Australian rugby league footballer

Mick Picker
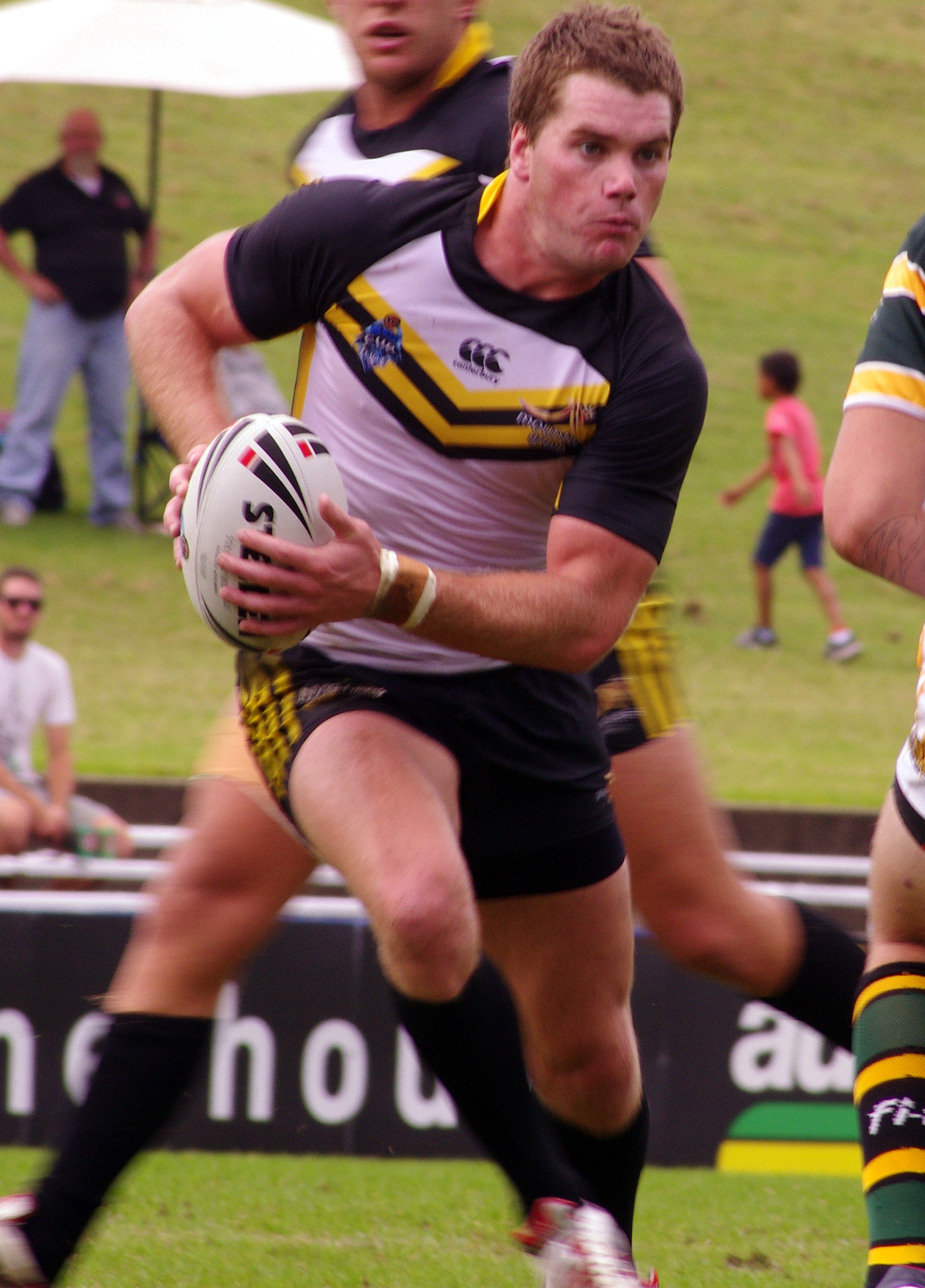

Personal information
- Full name: Michael Picker
- Born: 14 June 1989 (age 37) Crookwell, New South Wales, Australia

Playing information
- Height: 181 cm (5 ft 11 in)
- Weight: 86 kg (13 st 8 lb)
- Position: Hooker, Halfback, Five-eighth
Club
Years	Team	Pld	T	G	FG	P
2011	Canberra Raiders	4	1	0	0	4
- Relatives: Joe Picker (brother)

Michael Picker (born 14 June 1989) is an Australian former professional rugby league footballer who played in the 2010s for the Canberra Raiders in the National Rugby League. He is the younger brother of Joe Picker and younger brother Ben Picker played in the Raiders under 20s.

== Playing career ==
Picker started his NRL career in round 23 of the 2011 NRL season in a 29-point loss against South Sydney as 18th man. He received the ball 44 times and ran about 35m from 5 runs. He made 16 tackles, and suffered a shoulder injury.

In round 24 against the Gold Coast, he had more luck, starting at hooker replacing Alan Tongue. In round 25, the Canberra Raiders played Penrith at Bruce Stadium. He played 20 minutes and scored a try.

His final game in the top grade came in round 26 against Canterbury-Bankstown with the game finishing in a 36–22 loss.

== Post playing ==
In 2014, it was revealed that Picker had retired from rugby league and was self-employed living in Crookwell, New South Wales.
