= Michael Spence (rugby league) =

Australian rugby league footballer

Personal information
- Full name: Michael Spence
- Born: 30 March 1988 (age 38) Brisbane, Queensland, Australia
- Height: 190 cm (6 ft 3 in)
- Weight: 103 kg (16 st 3 lb)

Playing information
- Position: Lock, Second-row
Club
Years	Team	Pld	T	G	FG	P
2010	Brisbane Broncos	1	0	0	0	0
- Source: broncos.com.au RLP As of 9 May 2010

Michael Spence is an Australian former professional rugby league footballer who played in the 2000s and 2010s. He played for the Brisbane Broncos in the Telstra Premiership. Spence was by preference a lock, but he could comfortably take up the second-row role. Spence signed for Brisbane first grade from feeder club Redcliffe Dolphins after playing his junior football for Coffs Harbour Comets.

== First grade début ==
Spence made his first-grade début for the Brisbane club in round 9 of the 2010 NRL season against the Melbourne Storm. Both teams enduring hardship off the field, the Brisbane side were injury-hit and the Melbourne club were stripped of all titles and 2010 points following their breach of the salary cap, Brisbane had to rely on several Toyota Cup players to make up a full and competitive squad. Spence became one of these players in round 9, coming off the interchange bench in a 36–14 win at AAMI Park.

== Arrest ==
On 23 October 2013, Spence was arrested in Brisbane and charged with drug offences. Police allege he was the sergeant-at-arms of a local Hells Angels chapter. On 1 July 2015, Spence was released from prison after serving 18 months for drug trafficking.
