= Garret Crossman =

Australian rugby league footballer

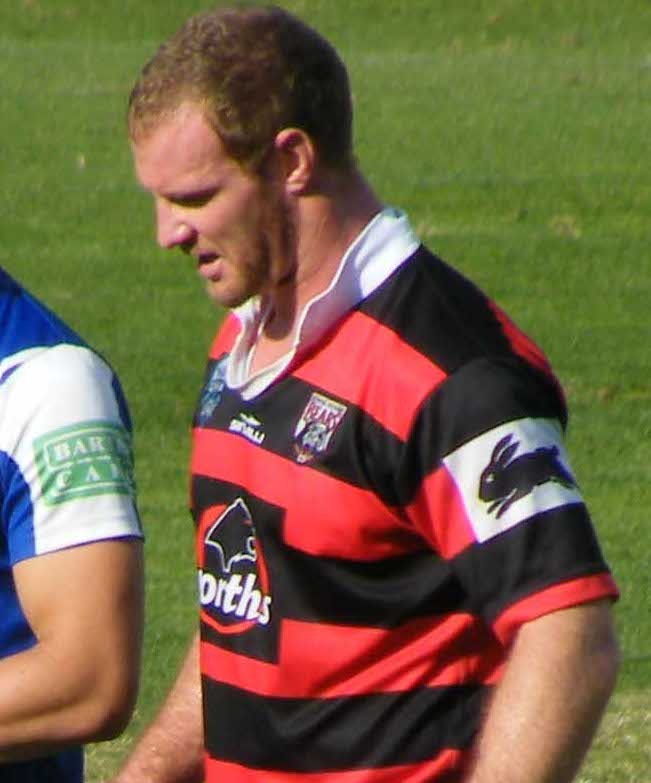

Personal information
- Full name: Garret Crossman
- Born: 7 December 1982 (age 43) Orange, New South Wales, Australia

Playing information
- Height: 6 ft 2 in (1.88 m)
- Weight: 17 st 4 lb (110 kg)
- Position: Prop
Club
Years	Team	Pld	T	G	FG	P
2004–05	Penrith Panthers	24	0	0	0	0
2006–07	Melbourne Storm	35	0	0	0	0
2008	Hull Kingston Rovers	29	1	1	0	6
2009–10	South Sydney	18	0	0	0	0
	Total	106	1	1	0	6

Garret Crossman (born 7 December 1982) is an Australian former professional rugby league footballer who played in the 2000s and 2010s. Crossman's position of choice was at prop. Crossman previously played for Hull Kingston Rovers in the Super League competition.

== Early life ==
Born in Orange, New South Wales. Crossman played for Bloomfield Tigers and Orange Hawks before being signed by the Penrith Panthers.

== Playing career ==
Crossman has previously played for the Penrith Panthers and Melbourne Storm.

He joined NRL side the South Sydney Rabbitohs from the 2009 season. Crossman spent most of his time with the North Sydney Bears in the NSW Cup making a total of 24 appearances.

Crossman was in negotiations with a view to a moving to the Harlequins RL, before choosing to sign for Hull Kingston Rovers and play in the Super League in 2008.
