= Steve Turner (rugby league) =

Australian rugby league footballer

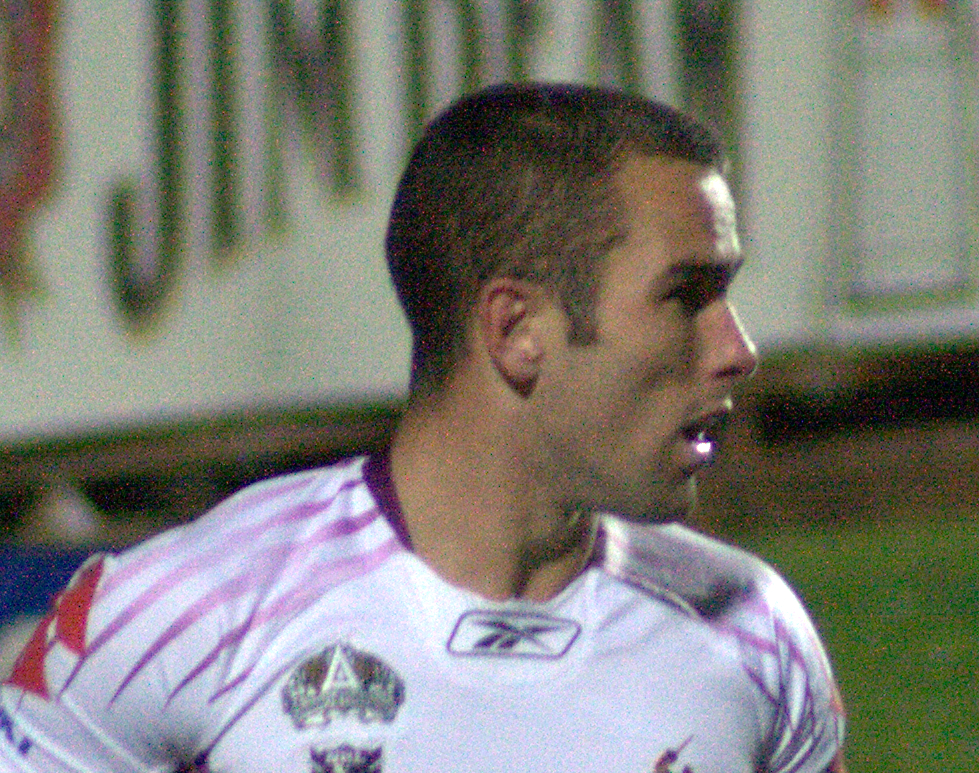

Personal information
- Full name: Steven Turner
- Born: 10 October 1984 (age 42) Blacktown, New South Wales, Australia

Playing information
- Height: 177 cm (5 ft 10 in)
- Weight: 86 kg (13 st 8 lb)
- Position: Wing, Fullback
Club
Years	Team	Pld	T	G	FG	P
2002–03	Penrith Panthers	2	1	0	0	4
2004–09	Melbourne Storm	105	59	14	0	264
2010–13	Canterbury Bulldogs	54	23	60	0	216
	Total	161	83	74	0	484
Representative
Years	Team	Pld	T	G	FG	P
2008	New South Wales	1	0	0	0	0
2012	NSW City	1	2	4	0	16

Steven "The Zap" Turner, (born on 10 October 1984) is an Australian former professional rugby league footballer. Turner played his club football in the National Rugby League for the Penrith Panthers, Melbourne Storm and the Canterbury-Bankstown Bulldogs. Turner played one game for New South Wales in the State of Origin. He primarily played as a wing.

== Early life ==
Growing up in Erskine Park, New South Wales, Turner was educated at James Erskine Primary School & St Dominic's College, Penrith.

Turner played junior rugby league with Cambridge Park RLFC and St Clair Comets. Turner then went to Cambridge Park and played fullback there for several years before making it to first grade.

Also an under-15 state level touch footballer, Turner was signed by the Penrith Panthers in 2000. He went on to play for NSW under-19s and the Junior Kangaroos.

== Professional career ==
In 2002, Turner made his NRL debut for Penrith against the Melbourne Storm. Turner then signed with Melbourne the next year.

In 2007, Turner was to be one of the inaugural members of the newly admitted Gold Coast Titans side after he announced in June 2006 that he had signed a new deal to the Gold Coast. Turner agreed to join the club until the end of 2009 but then later decided to remain at Melbourne.

Turner played his one and only game for the NSW Blues in game two of the 2008 State of Origin series, which the Blues lost 30–0. Turner was infamously ran over the top of by Queensland player Greg Inglis during the match on his way to the try line.

Turner signed with the Canterbury-Bankstown Bulldogs for the 2010 and 2011 seasons, competing for the place left by retired Canterbury icon Hazem El Masri. Turner scored his first double for the club in Canterbury's 60–14 thrashing of the Sydney Roosters in round 3.

In 2011, Turner took over the goal kicking duties when Bryson Goodwin was injured and became a successful goal kicker. On 17 March 2013, Turner announced his retirement from rugby league effective immediately due to a recurring knee injury.

== Post playing ==
In 2023 it was announced that Turner would coach the Bulldogs SG Ball squad.
