= History of the Canberra Raiders =

Rugby league team history

The History of the Canberra Raiders Rugby League Football Club began with their establishment in 1982. Along with the Illawarra Steelers, they became the first clubs from outside the Sydney area in over half a century to compete in the New South Wales Rugby Football League premiership. The Raiders have competed in every season of top-level rugby league in Australia since then and have won a total of three premierships: 1989, 1990 and 1994.

== Establishment ==
In 1981, the New South Wales Rugby Football League (NSWRFL) decided to expand the number of teams in its Sydney-based premiership for the first time since the 1960s. This time it would venture further out into the state of New South Wales by introducing two teams from outside Sydney. The Canberra franchise was accepted as the 14th team to compete in the NSWRFL premiership for the 1982 season, beating bids from Campbelltown, Newcastle and the Central Coast. They were admitted along with the Illawarra Steelers, of Wollongong. Thus the Canberra club, being in the Australian Capital Territory, was the first team ever from an Australian state other than New South Wales to compete in the premiership.

The initially unnamed team decided to adopt the name "Raiders", which was coined by the media in reference to the team being the first based outside Sydney since the old Newcastle team left the League in 1909.

== 1982–1986 ==
The club's first coach was former Australian international player and Easts coach, Don Furner who was coaching in the nearby town of Queanbeyan at the time. Their inaugural captain was Balmain forward, David Grant. Canberra's initial seasons were a mixed bag and they became notorious for late game collapses, leading to the nickname "Canberra Faders". In fact, no team had conceded more tries in a season than the 1982 Raiders. The club's first win, a 12-11 heartstopper v Newtown, came in its 8th match, and 3 more wins followed, most notably against then competition leaders Souths. The team earned the wooden spoon in their debut year, although this would be the last time they did so.

1983 saw a new captain, Newtown and former Kangaroos back, Allan McMahon, and nine wins, more than doubling 1982's four. However, the team continued to struggle to win away from home. Ron Giteau was handed the captaincy in 1984 and an away win first up that year foreshadowed a much improved season, a positive winning record (13-11) snagging a playoff for fifth versus Souths. But this game was lost (4-23), and the Raiders had still not succeeded in reaching the semi-finals of the competition.

1985 saw Dean Lance named captain of the club which had a regression, with the team winning only 8 games (though the reserves did reach the Grand Final). Though 1986 was similarly disappointing, the team had a core group of players, such as Mal Meninga, Gary Belcher, Steve Walters, and John Ferguson who would greatly influence the coming decade. Belcher became the first Raiders player to be selected to make his début for the Australian national side in 1986.

== 1987–1995 ==
This was the most successful period in the Raiders' short history, with 5 Grand Finals and 3 premierships. In 1987, Souths' Brisbane Rugby League premiership-winning coach and incumbent Queensland State of Origin coach, Wayne Bennett became Don Furner's co-coach at Canberra. Laurie Daley, Peter Jackson and Glenn Lazarus also debuted this year. The team finished third, resulting in a maiden semi-finals appearance. Despite losing their first finals match against Easts, the Raiders rallied to defeat Souths (46-12) and Easts again (32-24). The latter earned the team a place in the Grand Final, but they were never really competitive against minor premiers Manly, going down 8-18.

1988 saw the departure of the Furner-Bennett coaching partnership and a new coach in Penrith's Tim Sheens. Notable players starting out in 1988 were Bradley Clyde and Ricky Stuart. The 1988 season featured free-scoring (over 100 tries in 22 games) and a number of large victories, with the team again finishing in third place on the ladder. Unfortunately, a narrow loss against Canterbury in the Major Semi-final was followed by defeat against Balmain and an early exit.

Mal Meninga became captain of the club in 1989. With 5 rounds to play in the '89 season, Canberra were 7th and in danger of missing the semis. But a hard-fought 14–10 win over Easts started a 9-match winning streak, culminating in the club's first Premiership. In one of the all-time great Grand Finals, the Raiders sent the game into extra time after a late John Ferguson try that was converted by Meninga. Steve Jackson scored the winning try to win the premiership for the Raiders. This memorable match is now commemorated each year with the 1989 League Legends Cup. On 4 October, Canberra played British champions Widnes in the 1989 World Club Challenge at Old Trafford, Manchester. The Raiders lost 18 to 30 in front of 30,768.

1990 was a stellar year for the club at all levels. All three grades making the Grand Final, with only the reserves losing. The first grade side earned their first Minor Premiership and a second consecutive title, defeating Penrith in the decider.

Trouble brewed in 1991 as the club was embroiled in salary cap hardships. On 3 April, NSWRL general manager John Quayle revealed that Canberra were in breach of their salary cap when they won the previous year's premiership. Nonetheless, a fourth Grand Final berth was secured - the team's third in a row. However, the team went down to Penrith in a repeat of the 1990 Grand Final. Jason Croker, who would go on to become the team's longest serving player, debuted this year. The fallout from the salary cap imbroglio saw several players leave the club, most prominently Glenn Lazarus, Brent Todd, David Barnhill, Nigel Gaffey and Paul Martin. An average performance resulted, with the Raiders missing the finals for the first time since 1986.

David Furner, son of the Raiders' inaugural coach Don Furner, started out in 1992. The club finished 12th and failed to reach the finals. 1993 was a marked improvement, with the Raiders sitting in first place on the ladder with 2 rounds remaining when tragedy struck during their record breaking 68 - 0 victory over Parramatta at Bruce Stadium. Ricky Stuart suffered a bad leg break and the team went on to lose its next three games against Brisbane, St George and Canterbury. Having beaten all three of these teams recently in the season the Raiders were well placed to secure another Grand Final berth before the injury occurred.

1994 was the last season of the Raiders' and Australia's test captain, Mal Meninga. Canberra finished the regular season in 3rd place and successfully played their way to the grand final once again. Meninga went out in style, scoring the final try of the match as the Raiders scored their 3rd premiership in six seasons.

With the retirement of Meninga, Ricky Stuart was named as captain of the club in 1995. That season they finished second, but lost in the preliminary finals.

== 1996–2006 ==
Since their final premiership in 1994, the Raiders have been unable to scale their previous heights, largely due to their inability to lure representative players to the capital. The team bowed out in Round 1 of the 1996 finals series, losing to St George.

The next year, the Raiders were one of several teams that joined the breakaway Super League competition. Mal Meninga made a return to the club, this time as coach. Canberra lost in the preliminary final to eventual grand-finalists, the Cronulla-Sutherland Sharks.

It was upon rejoining the newly formed National Rugby League the following year that the team began their decline. The Raiders' problems came to a head in the late 1990s, when club legends Ricky Stuart (Laurie Daley succeeded him as club captain) and Bradley Clyde were forced out in order to accommodate players such as Brett Finch. Finch would ironically leave the Raiders soon after to play under Stuart, then a coach at the Cronulla-Sutherland Sharks.

The Raiders had mixed results in the new millennium, often finishing just inside or just outside the final eight and usually being bundled out of the finals in the early weeks. Simon Woolford became captain of the club in 2001. Matthew Elliott succeeded Mal Meninga as the Raiders' coach in 2002. In 2003, the Raiders unexpectedly led the competition for most of the season, almost clinching the minor premiership. They then lost narrowly to the Melbourne Storm in the opening finals game, but still advanced to Week 2 due to ladder position. In one of the closest games in recent history, the Raiders were eclipsed by one point in the preliminary final by the New Zealand Warriors and eliminated from the 2003 competition.

Many fans believed the achievements of 2003 would be improved in the following years. However, the Raiders finished a disappointing 8th in 2004, being knocked out in week one of the finals by the Sydney Roosters. Club legends Ruben Wiki and Mark McLinden left the Raiders for other clubs in this year. Wiki's loss, in particular, was a bitter pill to swallow for many Raiders fans, as it was found that the New Zealand Warriors had significantly breached the salary cap in signing him. The 2005 side was written off by fans and critics alike, as the club's two major signings, Jason Smith and Matt Adamson, were ageing veterans considered well past their prime. However, both, particularly Smith, proved formidable campaigners, and the Raiders were joint competition leaders in Round 10. But as the season progressed, injuries took their toll and the Raiders finished second last on points differential to the Newcastle Knights.

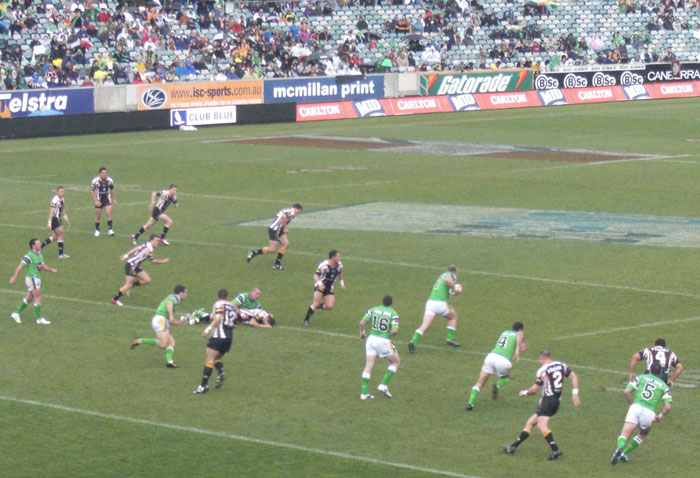
Raiders playing the Tigers at Canberra Stadium, July 2006

The Raiders started Season 2006 heavy favourites to run last, but despite this pessimism and heavy losses to the Knights and the Roosters early on, fought back and guaranteed themselves a finals berth with a round to play. 2006 saw club stalwarts Simon Woolford, newly named captain, Clinton Schifcofske and the club's longest serving player, Jason Croker, leave the club, going to St George Illawarra, the Queensland Reds rugby union team and Super League club the Catalans Dragons respectively. Outgoing backs Schifcofske and Adam Mogg both earned representative berths with Queensland in State of Origin. Saturday 9 September 2006 saw Jason Croker, Simon Woolford, Clinton Schifcofske, Michael Hodgson, Jason Smith and Adam Mogg all play their final games for the club. The round one finals series clash with the Bulldogs saw the Raiders defeated 30–12 in slippery and muddy conditions at Telstra Stadium, and eliminated from the 2006 premiership race. This was also the final match for coach Matthew Elliott, who is coaching Penrith in 2007. His replacement is former North Queensland Cowboys' assistant coach Neil Henry.

== 2007–2009 ==
In 2007, Canberra were an unknown quantity. Having lost star players such as Schifcofske, Smith, Croker and Woolford in key positions, the Raiders found themselves with a new captain in Alan Tongue relying on young, inexperienced players such as Todd Carney, William Zillman and Michael Dobson to step up and take on more prominent roles within the team. The sense of inexperience was reinforced by the selection of Neil Henry as coach, despite his lack of first-grade coaching experience. Though the Raiders were bolstered by late-season signings Neville Costigan and Matt Bickerstaff, several critics believed that the Raiders' significant loss of experience would result in their "winning" the wooden spoon.

2007 was, overall, a disappointing season for the Raiders, who finished in 14th place despite entering the top 8 midway through the season. However, two players - Phil Graham for Country Origin and Neville Costigan for Queensland - achieved representative status. The season was notable for the difference in the team's performance at and away from home, with just 2 of their 9 wins occurring outside Canberra. Coach Neil Henry incurred a fine of $10 000 for questioning the impartiality of the referee after the round 19 clash.

The 2008 season started with some promise for the Raiders - a good showing despite a loss in round 1 vs. Newcastle was followed up with two solid wins against Penrith and St. George-Illawarra. The club has since suffered a series of losses, whilst snaring only the occasional victory, with a big come from behind victory against Wests being noteworthy. In the representative field, Todd Carney and Joel Monaghan picked for Country Origin, and Monaghan being a shadow player for the New South Wales side. He also became the first Raider to represent Australia in eight years.

However, as in recent seasons, injuries have been the curse of the Canberra club, with no less than three players suffering dreaded ACL ruptures, essentially ending their season. Worse, the three players afflicted, Will Zillman, Lincoln Withers and Phil Graham are amongst the Raiders best players. Compounding this, talented back-rowers Neville Costigan and Tom Learoyd-Lahrs have spent minimal time on the field due to recurring minor injuries. The club has also suffered badly in the recruiting race, with Zillman and strong front rower Michael Weyman opting to go elsewhere next season, with indications that Costigan and Scott Logan will do the same. Additionally, half Michael Dobson left the club mid-season for the English club Hull KR, due to lack of opportunities in Canberra. Finally, Coach Neil Henry exercised a get-out clause in his contract, and opted to move to the North Queensland Cowboys in 2009. Former player and club legend, but inexperienced coach, David Furner took over the coaching reins over in 2009. To date, beyond a few talented youngsters, the club has yet to procure a single player of note for season 2009, and will once again be forced to rely on youthful talent. At Round 13, Canberra sat well outside the eight, and the season looked as though it could end with a whimper.

However, far from fading away, the Raiders bounced back with a comprehensive victory over the Brisbane Broncos and then proceeded to thrash the Canterbury Bulldogs, inflicting the worst loss on the Sydney-based club in over half a century. Despite successive losses to the Cronulla Sharks and defending premiers Melbourne Storm, Canberra fought hard in both games, then broke a 13-year losing streak in Wollongong (and ended a seven-match winning streak by the home team) with a win over St. George-Illawarra. The season highlight, however, was a comprehensive 34–12 win over league leaders, the Sydney Roosters. With 7 rounds left in the 2008 premiership, Canberra sits just one point outside the top eight. With a comparatively friendly draw, playing several teams below them on the table, the Raiders are poised to sneak into the semi-finals for the first time in two years. After a comprehensive 74–12 win over the Panthers the Raiders moved into an unexpected 6th spot on the ladder from 11th to almost cement a spot in the 2008 finals series with 4 games remaining. The raiders went closer to the top eight with two important wins against Newcastle and Souths, giving them a three match winning streak with two games remaining.

The season had not been without controversy, however, with star halfback Todd Carney and fullback Bronx Goodwin being stood down by the club after an altercation at a Canberra nightclub following the round 19 win against the Roosters. Carney was eventually dismissed by the club after failing to agree to the punishment plan the club had laid out for him, Goodwin's was sacked by the club however he appealed this decision and take it to the Industrial Relations Commission. However, in August 2009 he dropped the charges against the club.

On 6 September 2008, despite a heavy injury toll, the Raiders were guaranteed a place in the NRL 2008 Finals Series, a feat which was at the start of the season impossible according to Rugby League punditry in Australia. The Raiders semi-final appearance was brief, however. After being defeated by the Cronulla Sharks, the Raiders 6th-place finish was considered to be enough to get them a second chance. However, a huge upset with 8th place New Zealand defeating minor premiers Melbourne saw the Raiders eliminated.

The Raiders' Toyota Cup team won 28–24 over the Broncos' team in golden point extra time to with the Toyota Cup (Under 20s) premiership in the lead-up game to the NRL Grand Final on 5 October 2008

The Canberra Raiders lost founding father Les McIntyre in the 2009 pre-season on 22 February leading to the disruption of a pre-season camp and his name being embroidered on the club jerseys for the rest of the season 2009 season. A slow start to the 2009 season saw the raiders lose to the tigers and the roosters. However, with the help from under 20's debutants Josh Dugan, Jarrad Croker and Travis Waddell they won their next two matches. Despite a disappointing season for the raiders, losing to many close games, the Raiders beat the Melbourne Storm for the first time in 14 games and 7 years, 26–16, in round 16 to keep their slim finals hopes alive.

In 2009 the Raiders handed the Brisbane Broncos club the heaviest defeat in their history with a 56–0 win at Canberra Stadium, the largest winning margin of the season. The Raiders also had a win over the number-one team at the time St George-Illawarra Dragons, by 24–12. Despite wins against three of the top four (St George Illawarra Dragons, Gold Coast Titans and the Melbourne Storm) and coming within three points of the other (Canterbury-Bankstown Bulldogs) losses to bottom placed teams Cronulla Sharks and Sydney Roosters at home saw the raiders finish in 13th.

== 2010s ==
The 2010 season began traditionally poorly for Canberra with a loss to Penrith in the opening round however against early-season expectations that the Raiders would again struggle the club posted early season wins over Brisbane in round two, Parramatta in round five and the New Zealand Warriors in round eight in New Zealand in what was the club's first win in New Zealand since the early 2000s. However, losses to Todd Carney's new club the Roosters in round six and a narrow loss at home to South Sydney in round seven saw the club sitting second from last after round seven (last had the Melbourne Storm not been stripped of competition points due to salary cap breaches) of the 2010 season. Wins over the ladder-leading Dragons and the Gold Coast Titans followed until a four-game losing streak ensued; with the club sitting third from last after a round 17 home loss to the Roosters in what was Todd Carney's return to the nation's capital. The Raiders then began a run similar to that of Parramatta last year; winning eight of their next nine regular season matches to sneak into the top eight by season's end. The regular season's highest home attendance came when 20,445 fans filled Canberra Stadium to see the Raiders defeat the ladder-leading Dragons 32-16 for the second time in the season.

Canberra advanced to the finals on the back of eight wins from their past nine and were drawn a tough away final against the second-placed Penrith Panthers whom the Raiders had beaten just five weeks earlier. The Raiders led from the start and despite lapses at times during the match the Raiders managed to sniff out a narrow 24–22 win, thus achieving its first final win in a decade, which ironically was also against the Panthers. This saw the Raiders draw a home final against the Wests Tigers in round two of the finals. Having lost to the Tigers twice during the regular season, it was hoped that a record crowd of 26,746 would inspire the Raiders to continue their fairytale run deep into the finals, however a missed penalty attempt by Jarrod Croker in the final minutes of the match saw Canberra lose by 26-24 and therefore draw a curtain on the Raiders' 2010 season. The Raiders off season didn't start well, with Joel Monaghan being sacked by the club for inappropriate behaviour with a teammate's dog. This appeared to be a team building exercise, as photos surfaced showing the rest of the team cheering him on.

Canberra, looking to build on their strong finish to the 2010 season in 2011, bolstered its already strong roster with the addition of Blake Ferguson, Brett White and former Dally M medalist Matt Orford. The latter signing was an important one for the Raiders as vice-captain and star playmaker Terry Campese is out indefinitely due to a knee injury suffered in the semi-final loss to Wests at the end of the 2010 season. After starting the season with a 40-16 thumping of the Cronulla-Sutherland Sharks in round one, the Raiders have since lost their last eight matches in succession, and were sitting at the bottom of the ladder by round nine. Their fortunes started to turn when they caused the boilover of the 2011 season, upsetting the Melbourne Storm in Melbourne by 20–12. This was Canberra's first win in the Victorian capital since 2000. This was tempered by being held scoreless for the first time at home in their history by Melbourne in round 19, losing 26–0. One other unlikely win to the Raiders against a 7th place Bulldogs at home 20-12 has kept the momentum building as the Raiders look to turn their season around.

Canberra finished the 2012 NRL season in 6th position on the table and qualified for the finals. The club defeated the Cronulla-Sutherland Sharks in the qualifying final but were eliminated the following week by South Sydney in the semi-final.

The Canberra Raiders 2013 campaign began with two demoralising defeats to Penrith Panthers and Gold Coast Titans, only managing to score 10 points in the two games while conceding 68. Another early blow to the Raiders at the start of the 2013 season was the irresponsible behaviour of up and coming superstar Josh Dugan whom was sacked from the club for disciplinary reasons after he and teammate Blake Ferguson missed a team recovery session in favour of spending the day drinking on the rooftop of Blake Fergusons home. The Raiders then managed to win 5 of the next 7 games including upsets to the undefeated Melbourne Storm away from home and premiership favourites Sydney Roosters, winning all games played at Canberra Stadium for the first 12 rounds of the premiership season.

In 2014, Canberra hired Ricky Stuart as their new head coach. He had large success with the team. Star player, Anthony Milford, agreed to sign with rival team, Brisbane, disappointing Canberra fans. Canberra would finish the 2014 NRL season in 15th place, narrowly avoiding the wooden spoon.

In 2015, Canberra finished 10th off the back of well below average defence.

In 2016, Canberra finished 2nd, for just the 3rd time in their history. They made the finals for the first time since 2012, Jarrod Croker broke the club point scoring record, they scored the most points for any Raiders team in a single season and they made a preliminary final for the first time since 1997. They eventually lost in the preliminary final 14–12 to the Melbourne Storm at AAMI Park.

In 2017, Canberra finished in 10th position with 11 wins and 13 losses.

In the 2018 NRL season, Canberra finished in 10th place on the table and missed out on the finals for the second consecutive season. The year was typified by the fact that the club could not hold onto a lead in many games throughout the season with the club losing games against Brisbane and Penrith despite being between 14 and 18 points ahead in both matches.

The 2019 NRL season saw one of the best starts by the club since the 90's when they got off to a 5–1 record after the first 6 rounds. At the completion of round 21, Canberra sat in 3rd place with a record of 13 wins and 7 losses which is an almost identical position on the ladder and win–loss record they had at the same stage of the 2016 season. 2019 saw the introduction and flying start to their careers for new fullback Charnze Nicoll-Klokstad and the club's 4th English recruit John Bateman both of whom have been revelations for the club and vying for 'signing of the year'.

The Raiders qualified for the 2019 NRL Grand Final, defeating Minor Premiers Melbourne Storm and 3rd placed South Sydney Rabbitohs in the process.

=== 2020s ===
Canberra finished the 2020 NRL season in fifth place narrowly missing out on fourth place. The club would then go on to defeat Cronulla-Sutherland and the Sydney Roosters to set up a preliminary final match against Melbourne. Canberra would go on to lose the preliminary final to Melbourne at Suncorp Stadium which ended their season.

Canberra started the 2021 NRL season as one of the club's expected to finish in the top four and challenge for the premiership. After a good start to the year winning the opening two matches, Canberra would only win once in the next seven games. After round 16, Canberra found themselves in 13th place on the table after losing 44–6 against the Gold Coast. The club would then spark an end of season revival winning five of the next eight matches to be just outside the finals places. In the final round of the season, Canberra needed to beat the Sydney Roosters and hope other results went their way in order to qualify for the finals. Canberra would lose the match 40–16, which saw them finish the year in 10th place.

Canberra started the 2022 NRL season poorly which included a run of five straight losses. By round 14, Canberra were 11th on the table and looked unlikely to reach the top 8 until the club went on to win eight of their last ten matches to leapfrog Brisbane into 8th place. In week one of the finals, Canberra upset Melbourne 28-20 at AAMI Park. The following week, Canberra were defeated 40-4 by Parramatta which ended their season.
