= List of Canberra Raiders seasons =

Rugby league team

The Canberra Raiders competed in the NSWRL from 1982 until 1994, the ARL from 1995 to 1996, the Super League in 1997, and the NRL from 1998 until the current day.

== Seasons ==
NOTE: P=Premiers, R=Runners-Ups, M=Minor Premierships, F=Finals Appearance, W=Wooden Spoon

Season	Competition	Games Played	Games Won	Games Drawn	Games Lost	Ladder Position	P	R	M	F	W	Coach	Captain	Notes
1st	1982 NSWRFL season	26	4	0	22	14/14					X	Don Furner Snr	David Grant	Wooden Spoon
2nd	1983 NSWRFL season	26	9	0	17	10/14						Don Furner Snr	Allan McMahon	
3rd	1984 NSWRL season	24	13	0	11	6/13				X		Don Furner Snr	Ron Giteau	Playoff
4th	1985 NSWRL season	24	8	2	14	10/13						Don Furner Snr	Ron Giteau	
5th	1986 NSWRL season	24	8	1	15	11/13						Don Furner Snr	Dean Lance	
6th	1987 NSWRL season	24	15	0	9	3/13		X		X		Don Furner Snr & Wayne Bennett	Dean Lance	Runners-up
7th	1988 NSWRL season	22	15	0	7	3/16				X		Tim Sheens	Dean Lance	Minor Semi-final
8th	1989 NSWRL season	22	14	0	8	4/16	X			X		Tim Sheens	Mal Meninga	Premiers
9th	1990 NSWRL season	22	16	1	5	1/16	X		X	X		Tim Sheens	Mal Meninga	Premiers, Minor Premiers
10th	1991 NSWRL season	22	14	0	8	4/16		X		X		Tim Sheens	Mal Meninga	Runners-up
11th	1992 NSWRL season	22	10	0	12	12/16						Tim Sheens	Mal Meninga	
12th	1993 NSWRL season	22	16	1	5	4/16				X		Tim Sheens	Mal Meninga	Minor Semi-final
13th	1994 NSWRL season	22	17	0	5	3/16	X			X		Tim Sheens	Mal Meninga	Premiers
14th	1995 ARL season	22	20	0	2	2/20				X		Tim Sheens	Ricky Stuart	Preliminary Final
15th	1996 ARL season	21	13	1	7	6/20				X		Tim Sheens	Ricky Stuart	Qualifying Final
16th	1997 Super League season	18	11	0	7	3/10				X		Mal Meninga	Ricky Stuart	Preliminary Final
17th	1998 NRL season	24	15	0	9	7/20				X		Mal Meninga	Laurie Daley	Qualifying Final
18th	1999 NRL season	24	13	1	10	9/17						Mal Meninga	Laurie Daley	
19th	2000 NRL season	26	15	0	11	4/14				X		Mal Meninga	Laurie Daley	Semi-final
20th	2001 NRL season	26	9	1	16	11/14						Mal Meninga	Simon Woolford	
21st	2002 NRL season	24	10	1	13	8/15				X		Matthew Elliott	Simon Woolford	Qualifying Final
22nd	2003 NRL season	24	16	0	8	4/15				X		Matthew Elliott	Simon Woolford	Semi-final
23rd	2004 NRL season	24	11	0	13	8/15				X		Matthew Elliott	Simon Woolford	Qualifying Final
24th	2005 NRL season	24	9	0	15	14/15						Matthew Elliott	Simon Woolford	
25th	2006 NRL season	24	13	0	11	8/15				X		Matthew Elliott	Clinton Schifcofske	Qualifying Final
26th	2007 NRL season	24	9	0	15	14/16						Neil Henry	Alan Tongue	
27th	2008 NRL season	24	13	0	11	6/16				X		Neil Henry	Alan Tongue	Qualifying Final
28th	2009 NRL season	24	9	0	15	13/16						David Furner	Alan Tongue	
29th	2010 NRL season	24	13	0	11	7/16				X		David Furner	Alan Tongue	Semi-final
30th	2011 NRL season	24	6	0	18	15/16						David Furner	Alan Tongue	
31st	2012 NRL season	24	13	0	11	6/16				X		David Furner	Terry Campese	Semi-final
32nd	2013 NRL season	24	10	0	14	13/16						David Furner	Terry Campese	
33rd	2014 NRL season	24	8	0	16	15/16						Ricky Stuart	Jarrod Croker	
34th	2015 NRL season	24	10	0	14	10/16						Ricky Stuart	Jarrod Croker	
35th	2016 NRL season	24	17	1	6	2/16				X		Ricky Stuart	Jarrod Croker	Preliminary Final
36th	2017 NRL season	24	11	0	13	10/16						Ricky Stuart	Jarrod Croker	
37th	2018 NRL season	24	10	0	14	10/16						Ricky Stuart	Jarrod Croker	
38th	2019 NRL season	24	15	0	9	4/16		X		X		Ricky Stuart	Jarrod Croker & Josh Hodgson	Runners-up
39th	2020 NRL season	20	14	0	6	5/16				X		Ricky Stuart	Jarrod Croker & Josh Hodgson	Preliminary Final
40th	2021 NRL season	24	10	0	14	10/16						Ricky Stuart	Jarrod Croker & Elliott Whitehead	
41st	2022 NRL season	24	14	0	10	8/16				X		Ricky Stuart	Jarrod Croker & Elliott Whitehead	Semi-final
42nd	2023 NRL season											Ricky Stuart	Elliott Whitehead	
