= List of Canberra Raiders coaches =

There have been 14 coaches of the Canberra Raiders since their first season in 1982.

== List of coaches ==
No.	Name	Seasons	Games	Wins	Losses	Draws	Winning Percentage	Premiers	Runners-up	Minor premiers	Wooden spoons
1	Don Furner	1982−1987	151	58	90	3	38.4%	−	1987	−	1982
2	Billy Sullivan	1982	1	0	1	0	0%	−	−	−	−
3	Allan McMahon	1986	1	1	0	0	100%	−	−	−	−
4	Wayne Bennett	1987	28	17	11	0	60.7%	−	1987	−	−
5	Tim Sheens	1988−1996	219	148	68	3	67.3%	1989, 1990, 1994	1991	1990	−
6	Graham Rogers	1991	1	1	0	0	100%	−	−	−	−
7	Mal Meninga	1997−2001	131	71	58	2	54.2%	−	−	−	−
8	Matthew Elliott	2002−2006	125	59	65	1	47.2%	−	−	−	−
9	Neil Henry	2007−2008	49	22	27	0	44.9%	−	−	−	−
10	David Furner	2009−2013	121	53	68	0	43.8%	−	−	−	−
11	Andrew Dunemann	2013	3	0	3	0	0%	−	−	−	−
12	Ricky Stuart	2014−present	271	139	131	1	51.3%	−	2019	−	−
13	Andrew McFadden	2022	1	1	0	0	100%	−	−	−	−
14	Brett White	2022	1	1	0	0	100%	−	−	−	−

== See also ==
- List of current NRL coaches
- List of current NRL Women's coaches
