= Canberra Milk =

Australian milk products manufacturer

- Industry: Retail
- Founded: 1952
- Headquarters: Canberra, Australia
- Parent: Capitol Chilled Foods
- Website: Official website

Canberra Milk is an Australian manufacturer of milk products owned by Capitol Chilled Foods. The multinational company Bega Dairy & Drinks has a controlling interest in Capitol Chilled Foods, which is the Australian Capital Territory's sole dairy manufacturer. Bega Cheese Ltd owns a 25% stake.

Canberra Milk has previously sponsored local sports teams the Brumbies, and are a foundation sponsor of the Canberra Raiders.

In September 2020 it was announced Canberra Milk will be the Canberra Raiders’ front of jersey sponsor for the 2021 season, having previously featured prominently on the Raiders' strip during the club's golden era between 1993 and 1995.

In February 2023, Bega Group announced it is ceasing the manufacture of its fresh dairy products at its Canberra facility in Griffith (previously known as Capitol Chilled Foods) and relocating manufacture to the group’s Penrith site.

== See also ==
- Dairy farming in Australia
