= Billy Sullivan (rugby league) =

Australian rugby league coach (1927-2018)

Personal information
- Born: 16 July 1927
- Died: 31 October 2018 (aged 91)
- Position: Prop

Coaching information
Club
Years	Team	Gms	W	D	L	W%
1982	Canberra Raiders	1	0	0	1	0

Billy Sullivan is an Australian former rugby league player and coach.

A front-rower, Sullivan started his career with home town club Temora and played in three Group 9 premierships. He was a Monaro and New South Wales country representative player.

Sullivan got his first coaching role with a year at Dunedoo in 1962. He competed for the Queanbeyan Blues from 1964 to 1967 and served as captain-coach in his first season, then played under Don Furner thereafter. As captain, Sullivan lead the Blues to grand final wins in both 1965 and 1967. He was appointed coach of the Queanbeyan Kangaroos for their inaugural Group 8 season in 1968.

During the 1980s, Sullivan was part of the Canberra Raiders coaching staff, renewing a relationship with his former Blues teammate and coach Don Furner. He took charge of the Raiders reserves and stood in as first-grade coach for a match against Canterbury in 1982, when Furner was absent on a scouting trip.
