= Graham Rogers (rugby league) =

Australian rugby league coach

Personal information
- Full name: Graham Leonard Rogers
- Born: 18 November 1941
- Died: 15 April 2021 (aged 79)

Coaching information
Club
Years	Team	Gms	W	D	L	W%
1991	Canberra Raiders	1	1	0	0	100

Graham Leonard Rogers (18 November 1941 – 15 April 2021) was an Australian rugby league coach.

Known as "Buck", Rogers made his name in ACT rugby league during the 1980s, coaching sides including Goulburn United, Belconnen United and North Canberra, as well as the Monaro Division representative team.

Rogers coached the Canberra Raiders during the 1982 President's Cup and in 1988 took over as reserves coach. He led the reserves to the 1990 grand final, which they lost in extra time to the Brisbane Broncos. In the 1991 NSWRL season, Rogers led the Raiders first-grade side to a win over ladder leaders Penrith, while standing in for Tim Sheens who was unavailable due to State of Origin duties.

In 1992, Rogers joined the Phil Gould-coached Penrith Panthers and took charge of their reserves. (Note: Some sources suggest Rogers stood in for an ill Phil Gould as Penrith's coach against the Gold Coast for the final round of the 1992 NSWRL season, but the Sydney Morning Herald match report states John Cartwright acted as captain-coach.)
