= Matt Bickerstaff =

Australian rugby league footballer (born 1976)

Personal information
- Full name: Matt Bickerstaff
- Born: 27 April 1976 (age 50) Sydney, New South Wales, Australia

Playing information
- Height: 184 cm (6 ft 1/2 in)
- Weight: 101 kg (15 st 13 lb; 223 lb)
- Position: Second-row, Lock
Club
Years	Team	Pld	T	G	FG	P
1996–97	South Queensland	17	3	0	0	12
2002–04	Cronulla-Sutherland	59	5	0	0	20
2006	St George Illawarra	25	4	0	0	16
2007	Canberra Raiders	2	1	0	0	4
	Total	103	13	0	0	52

Matt Bickerstaff (born 27 April 1976) is an Australian former professional rugby league footballer who played in the 1990s and 2000s. He played in the National Rugby League competition for the South Queensland Crushers, Cronulla-Sutherland Sharks, St George Illawarra Dragons and the Canberra Raiders primarily as a second-row.

== Playing career ==
Bickerstaff was born in Sydney. He signed with the South Queensland Crushers and his first grade debut was in Round 4 of the 1996 ARL season against local rivals, the Brisbane Broncos. Both of Bickerstaff's seasons at South Queensland ended with wooden spoons.

In 2002, Bickerstaff joined Cronulla-Sutherland and in his first season made 20 appearances for the club as they reached the preliminary final before losing to New Zealand. Bickerstaff left Cronulla at the end of 2004. He then went on to have spells with St George and Canberra.

Bickerstaff retired having played 103 first grade games, and scoring 13 tries. When he played his last game with the Raiders, Bickerstaff was the last former South Queensland Crushers player still playing in the NRL.

== Sources ==
- Whiticker, Alan & Hudson, Glen (2006) The Encyclopedia of Rugby League Players, Gavin Allen Publishing, Sydney
