= Simon Woolford =

Australian RL coach and former rugby league footballer

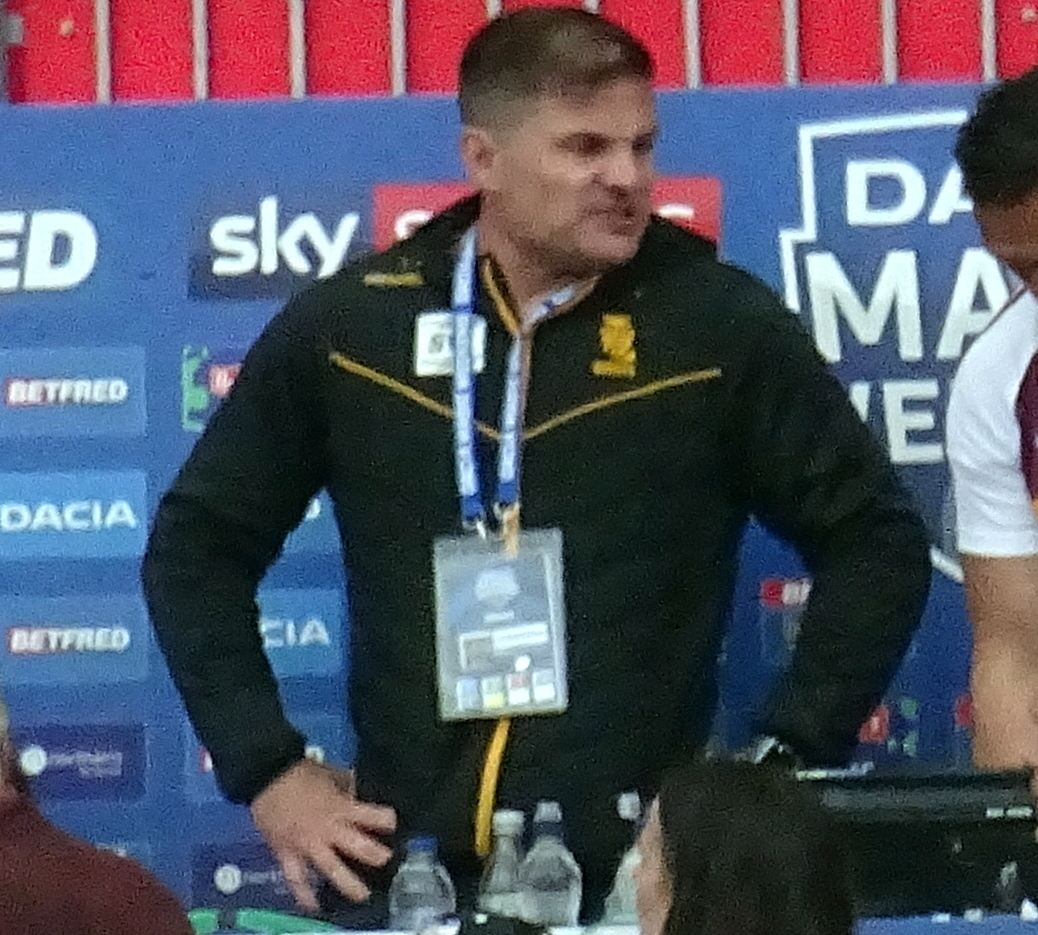

Personal information
- Full name: Simon Woolford
- Born: 7 April 1975 (age 50) Young, New South Wales, Australia
- Height: 178 cm (5 ft 10 in)
- Weight: 90 kg (14 st 2 lb)

Playing information
- Position: Hooker
Club
Years	Team	Pld	T	G	FG	P
1994–06	Canberra Raiders	234	35	1	0	142
2007–08	St. George Illawarra	28	1	0	0	4
	Total	262	36	1	0	146
Representative
Years	Team	Pld	T	G	FG	P
2002	NSW Country	1	0	0	0	0

Coaching information
Club
Years	Team	Gms	W	D	L	W%
2018–20	Huddersfield Giants	48	23	0	25	48
- Source: As of 11 September 2024
- Relatives: Zac Woolford (son)

Simon Woolford (born 7 April 1975) is an Australian professional rugby league coach who was most recently the head coach of the Huddersfield Giants in the Super League, and a former professional rugby league footballer.

He played in the NRL for the Canberra Raiders and the St. George Illawarra Dragons, and represented Country in the City vs Country Origin match in 2002.

== Background ==
Woolford was born in Young, New South Wales, Australia.

== Playing career ==
Woolford played for the Canberra Raiders and St. George Illawarra Dragons in the NRL. He primarily played as a hooker. He made his first grade debut for Canberra on 29 May 1994 in round 11 of the season. He played for NSW Country in the City vs Country Origin match in 2002.

== Coaching career ==
Woolford coached the Queanbeyan Blues in the Canberra Rugby League competition. In 2015 he was suspended for nine months after breaking the window of the coaching box. This was later overturned in a retrial and a suspended sentence of 3 months was handed out. In 2016, Woolford began coaching the Newcastle Intrust Super Premiership NSW side and in 2017 took the club to the finals.

On 29 April 2018 Woolford was announced as the head coach of Huddersfield Giants in Super league on a two-and-a-half-year deal. He took over form Chris Thorman, who had been in charge on an interim basis following the sacking of Rick Stone earlier in the season.

At the start of the 2020 Super League season, it was announced that Woolford would be departing Huddersfield at the end of the campaign. On 16 September 2020, Woolford resigned from Huddersfield with immediate effect after a poor run of results.

== Sources ==
- Whiticker, Alan; Hudson, Glen (2007). The Encyclopedia of Rugby League Players. Wetherill Park, New South Wales: Gary Allen Pty Ltd. p. 609. ISBN 978-1-877082-93-1.

Sporting positions
Preceded by Laurie Daley	Canberra Raiders captain 2001-2005	Succeeded by Clinton Schifcofske
Preceded by Chris Thorman; 2018	Coach Huddersfield Giants; 2018–2020	Succeeded by Luke Robinson (interim); 2020
