= Alan Tongue =

Australian rugby league footballer

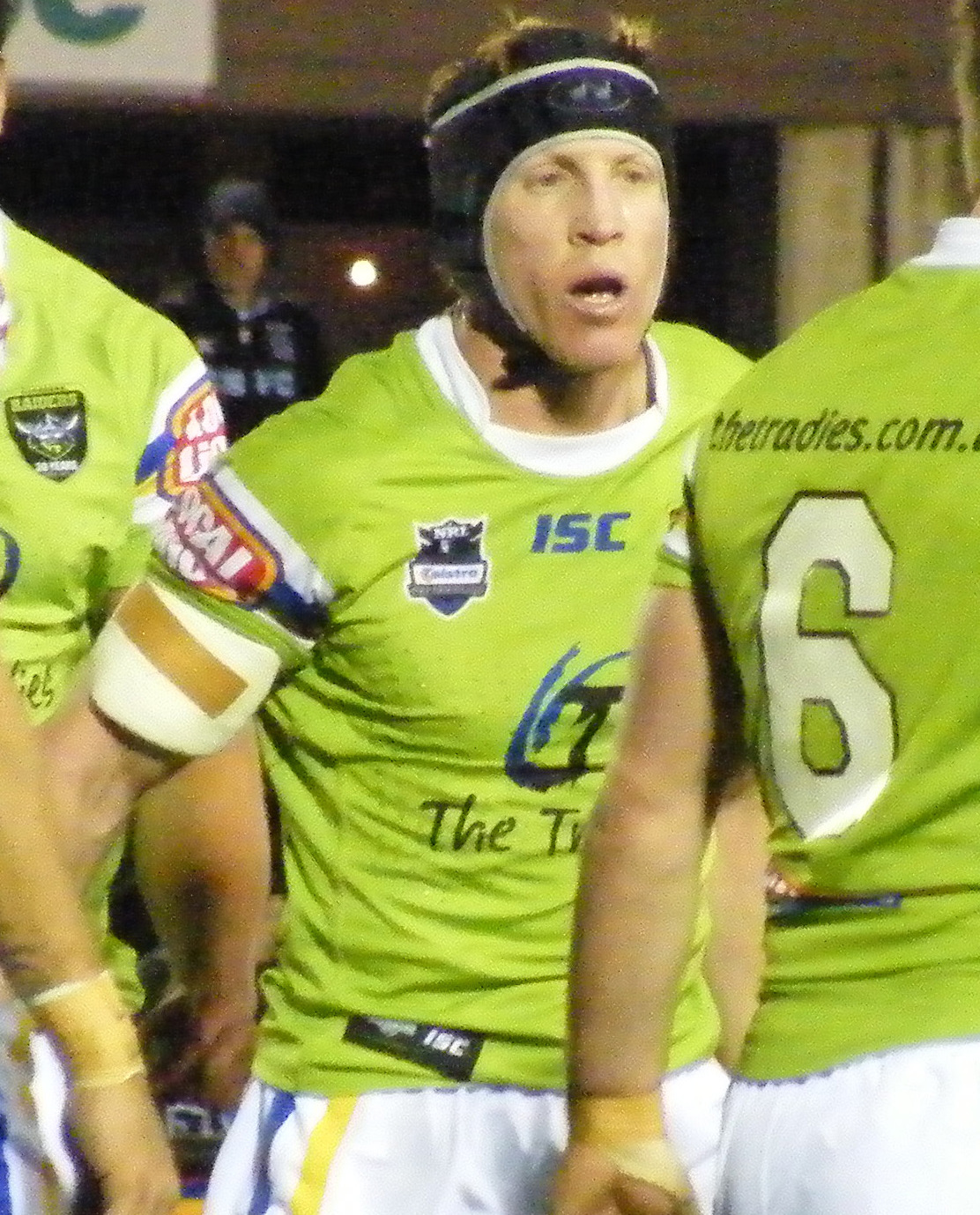

Personal information
- Born: 13 October 1980 (age 46) Tamworth, New South Wales, Australia

Playing information
- Height: 180 cm (5 ft 11 in)
- Weight: 87 kg (13 st 10 lb)
- Position: Lock, Hooker, Second-row
Club
Years	Team	Pld	T	G	FG	P
2000–11	Canberra Raiders	220	31	0	1	125
Representative
Years	Team	Pld	T	G	FG	P
2008	Prime Minister's XIII	3	0	0	0	0
2009	Country Origin	1	1	0	0	4

Alan Tongue (born 13 October 1980) is an Australian former professional rugby league footballer who played in the 2000s and 2010s. A Country New South Wales representative forward, he captained the Canberra Raiders for several seasons in the NRL.

== Background ==
Tongue was born in Tamworth, New South Wales, Australia.

== Early years ==
While attending Farrer Memorial Agricultural High School in 1998, Tongue was selected to play for his country in the Australian Schoolboys team. While attending Farrer, Tongue was on a scholarship contract with the Brisbane Broncos from grades 10 to 12.

== Playing career ==
Tongue is a 10-year veteran at Canberra, making his debut in 2000 and winning the Raiders' Rookie of the Year award after joining the club in 1998. He spent the majority of his early years moving between the backrow and the interchange bench. He established his position within the side in 2005, and in 2006 Tongue broke the record for most tackles in the regular season with 1,087. The next highest ranking player was Nathan Hindmarsh with 911. Tongue was also voted the Raider's Player of the Year in 2006.

At the end of the 2008 NRL regular season, Tongue was awarded Dally M recognition for Lock of the Year and Captain of the Year after leading the Raiders to 6th on the competition ladder. Tongue was also named in the Prime Minister's XIII at the end of 2008.

Tongue was selected in the City vs Country match on 8 May 2009. In this game he scored a rare try in a 40–18 defeat.

In his 200th game for Canberra, on 28 August 2010, a Tongue supporter commented on the opposition (North Queensland Cowboys, through its player Willie Mason) in a sexually suggestive crowd poster shown prominently at the stadium and in TV coverage: "Who needs a Big Willie when you have a great Tongue?". In this game, Tongue returned to the side, and suffered another injury, in a 48-4 high scoring win over the Cowboys at Canberra Stadium that had the Raiders join the top 8 teams in the competition and join the finals rounds for the 2010 competition.

Tongue announced his retirement on 17 August 2011.

== Post-playing career ==
Tongue is an Australian Apprenticeships Ambassador for the Australian Government and an Apprentice Mentor in the NRL's Trading Up program. As an NRL Ambassador, since 2017 he has conducted workshops as part of the NRL's Voice Against Violence program.

Tongue was named ACT Australian of the Year in 2017.

Sporting positions
Preceded by Clinton Schifcofske	Canberra Raiders captain 2007–2011	Succeeded by Terry Campese
