= Clinton Schifcofske =

Australian dual-code rugby footballer

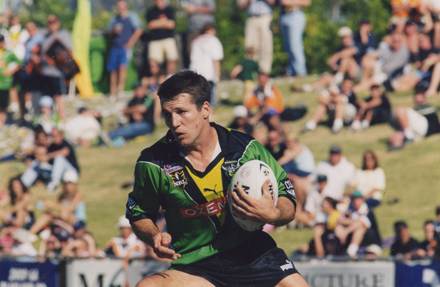

Personal information
- Full name: Clinton Schifcofske
- Born: 10 November 1975 (age 51) Moranbah, Queensland, Australia

Playing information
- Height: 183 cm (6 ft 0 in)
- Weight: 93 kg (14 st 9 lb)

Rugby league
- Position: Fullback, Wing
Club
Years	Team	Pld	T	G	FG	P
1996–97	South Queensland	23	7	40	0	108
1998–00	Parramatta Eels	72	21	180	0	444
2001–06	Canberra Raiders	139	44	432	12	1052
2010–11	Crusaders RL	47	6	120	0	264
	Total	281	78	772	12	1868
Representative
Years	Team	Pld	T	G	FG	P
2002–06	Queensland	2	0	2	0	4
2005	Prime Minister's XIII	1	0	4	0	8

Rugby union
- Position: Fullback, Wing
Club
Years	Team	Pld	T	G	FG	P
2006–08	Queensland Reds	23	3	70	0	197
2007	Ballymore Tornadoes	8	2	20	0	82
2008–10	Ulster	30	1	22	0	65
	Total	61	6	112	0	344
Representative
Years	Team	Pld	T	G	FG	P
2007	Australia A	4	2	25	0	66

Clinton Schifcofske (born 10 November 1975), also known by the nickname of "Choka", is an Australian former professional rugby league and rugby union footballer. During his career, he played for the Crusaders in the Super League. as well as the South Queensland Crushers, the Parramatta Eels and the Canberra Raiders in Australia, as a fullback. In the sport of rugby union, he played for Irish club Ulster in the Celtic League competition and also he spent a year with Queensland Reds in Super Rugby.

== Background ==
Schifcofske was born in Moranbah, Queensland, he is of Polish descent, his parents were both born in Australia to Polish parents.

== Rugby league ==
Schifcofske made his first grade debut for the now defunct South Queensland side in Round 5 1996 against the North Sydney Bears at North Sydney Oval. However his rookie season was marred by a five match suspension after testing positive for a banned testosterone-based supplement.

The following year, Schifcofske made 17 appearances for the club as they finished last on the table for the second consecutive year. Schifcofske played in South Queensland's last ever game as a club which was against Western Suburbs which South Queensland won 39–18 with Schifcofske scoring a try and kicking 7 goals.

In 1998, Schifcofske joined Parramatta and played every game of the 1998 season as the club finished 4th on the table.

Schifcofske scored a try in the first half of the match as Parramatta took a 10–2 lead going into half time. With Parramatta leading 18–2 with less than 10 minutes to play, Canterbury staged a comeback scoring 3 tries in 8 minutes with Canterbury player Daryl Halligan kicking 2 goals from the sideline to tie the game at 18-18. Parramatta player Paul Carige then made a series of personal errors which cost Parramatta dearly in extra time with Canterbury going on to win 32–20.

In 1999, Parramatta finished 2nd on the ladder and qualified for the finals with Schifcofske playing every match. Parramatta went on to reach the preliminary final against Melbourne. Parramatta lead the match 16–0 at halftime before a second half capitulation similar to what happened a year earlier occurred with Melbourne winning 18–16.

In 2000, Parramatta finished 7th and qualified for the finals with the media dubbing the team "The Baby Eels" due to the age of the squad. Parramatta and Schifcofske would reach their third consecutive preliminary final with the opponents being favorites Brisbane. Brisbane went on to win the match 16–10. This would be the last game Schifcofske would play for the club and he was released at the end of 2000. Schifcofske then signed with Canberra.

In 2001 and 2004 Schifcofske was named the Canberra Raiders' player of the year. In 2006 he was made captain of the club. In the same year, due to an injury incurred by Karmichael Hunt, Schifcofske was chosen in the Queensland Maroons side for the 2006 State of Origin series decider. He was the Maroons' third fullback for the series after Matt Bowen was dropped after Game One.

During the middle of the 2006 season he made the decision to switch codes from Rugby League to Rugby Union signing a two-year deal with the Queensland Reds for the 2007 season. During the 2006 season, one of Schifcofske's penalty goal attempts in a match against the Wests Tigers was the subject of Ray Warren's commentary; as he was taking the shot, Warren called the words: "Eddie Jones (who was at the time the coach of the Queensland Reds), if you're watching..." and Schifcofske nailed the shot. In the same match, he nailed a field goal in golden point to win Canberra the match. He had the best goal kicking success rate in the NRL ahead of both Andrew Johns and Hazem El Masri. His final NRL match was played at Telstra Stadium on 9 September 2006 against the Canterbury Bulldogs where the Raiders were knocked out of the finals race. He finished the 2006 NRL season as the Raiders' top point-scorer. Schifcofske ran 3,741 metres with the ball in 2006, more than any other player in the competition.

Schifcofske's 1,604 points in first grade placed him 9th in Australian rugby league's all-time top point scoring list.

== Rugby union ==
Schifcofske's Rugby Union career started when the Queensland Reds took on Japan in November 2006 with Schifcofske having a sound performance in his first game and then playing for an invitational World XV side against The Springboks. After being planned to be used as a goal-kicking winger by Eddie Jones the season-ending injury to Reds and Wallabies Fullback Chris Latham, Schifcofske was selected to play in his preferred position of Fullback. In 2007, he represented Australia A in the Pacific Nations Cup in all 5 games. Australia finished runners up to the Junior All Blacks.

Schifcofske is weighing up a two-year offer from the Reds as well as interest from five other clubs, including a large deal from Ulster Rugby. It's understood two are from league, an unnamed NRL club and Perpignan-based Super League franchise Catalans Dragons, while other interest comes from rugby union clubs in England and Japan.

It has since been confirmed that he will be leaving the Reds at the end of the 2008 Super 14 season, and joining the Irish province Ulster for three seasons.

== Return to rugby league ==
Midway through 2010's Super League XV, Schifcofske signed with the Crusaders, returning to rugby league. After Michael Witt suffered a season-ending knee injury, Schifcofske became the team's primary goal kicker. In 20 appearances for the Crusaders in 2010, he scored a team-high 120 points.

== Awards and honors ==
- State of Origin: Played 2 games in total for Queensland (2002 & 2006)
- 2006 Dally M Fullback of the Year.

Sporting positions
Preceded by Simon Woolford	Canberra Raiders captain 2006	Succeeded by Alan Tongue
