= David Furner =

Australian rugby league player and coach

Personal information
- Born: 6 February 1971 (age 55) Queanbeyan, New South Wales, Australia

Playing information
- Height: 180 cm (5 ft 11 in)
- Weight: 97 kg (15 st 4 lb)
- Position: Second-row
Club
| Years | Team | Pld | T | G | FG | P |
|---|---|---|---|---|---|---|
| 1992–00 | Canberra Raiders | 200 | 49 | 511 | 0 | 1218 |
| 2001–02 | Wigan Warriors | 58 | 21 | 13 | 0 | 110 |
| 2003–04 | Leeds Rhinos | 52 | 12 | 38 | 0 | 124 |
| | Total | 310 | 82 | 562 | 0 | 1452 |
Representative
| Years | Team | Pld | T | G | FG | P |
| 1994 | Australia | 1 | 0 | 0 | 0 | 0 |
| 1996 | Country Origin | 1 | 0 | 0 | 0 | 0 |
| 1996–00 | New South Wales | 8 | 1 | 0 | 0 | 4 |
| 1997 | New South Wales (SL) | 3 | 0 | 3 | 0 | 6 |
| 1997 | Australia (SL) | 1 | 2 | 0 | 0 | 8 |

Coaching information
Club
| Years | Team | Gms | W | D | L | W% |
| 2009–13 | Canberra Raiders | 109 | 47 | 0 | 62 | 43 |
| 2019 | Leeds Rhinos | 15 | 5 | 0 | 10 | 33 |
| | Total | 124 | 52 | 0 | 72 | 42 |
- Education: St Edmund's College, Canberra
- Father: Don Furner

David Furner (born 6 February 1971) is an Australian professional rugby league football coach who was the head coach of the Leeds Rhinos, and a former player. He is an assistant coach for the South Sydney Rabbitohs in the NRL, and the former head coach of the Canberra Raiders with whom he spent his whole Australian playing career. A New South Wales State of Origin and Australia national representative goal-kicking second-row forward, he left the Raiders as the third greatest point-scoring forward in NRL history before enjoying a successful career in England with the Wigan Warriors and the Leeds Rhinos.

== Background ==
Son of former Eastern Suburbs and Canberra Raiders coach and Australian Kangaroos footballer, and coach, Don Furner, David Furner was born in Queanbeyan, New South Wales on 6 February 1971. He attended St Edmund's College, Canberra. Before embarking on a successful career in rugby league, Furner was a Queanbeyan Whites rugby union junior and a member of the Australian under-17 and under-21 rugby union team.

== Playing career ==
=== Canberra Raiders ===
Furner switched to rugby league in 1991 when he joined the Canberra Raiders. He made his first-grade début in round 2 of the 1992 season against Manly-Warringah. Furner was part of the 1994 Canberra Raiders premiership team, winning the Clive Churchill Medal for Man of the Match. Furner's strong performance led to his selection for the 1994 Kangaroo tour squad. Furner's father, Don, chairman of selectors, abstained from voting. He made his test début for Australia in the opening Ashes series test at Wembley Stadium on 22 October 1994, though Australia were ultimately defeated 8–4 by Great Britain. This would prove to be Furner's only official test appearance. When Furner left Canberra at the end of the 2000 season, he had surpassed Bernie Purcell's record as the highest point-scoring forward in the game with 1218 points. Also in 2000 he was awarded the Australian Sports Medal for his contribution to Australia's international standing in rugby league.

=== Wigan Warriors ===
After leaving Canberra, Furner moved to the Super League where he played for the Wigan Warriors with them he won the Challenge Cup. Furner played for the Wigan Warriors at second-row and kicked a goal in their 2001 Super League Grand Final loss to the Bradford Bulls.

=== Leeds Rhinos ===
After that he joined the Leeds Rhinos, with whom he played at lock in their 2004 Super League Grand Final victory against the Bradford Bulls.

== Coaching career ==
=== Canberra Raiders ===
On his return to Australia from England, Furner took on a role as assistant-coach at the Canberra Raiders in 2006. In 2008, following Neil Henry's appointment as coach for the North Queensland Cowboys, Furner was named as Canberra's coach for 2009. A year earlier his brother, Don Furner, Jr., was appointed CEO of the Raiders.

Furner's first season with Canberra did not start well with the team only winning 4 games during the first half of the season. He was criticised by fans for changing the dynamic attacking style that was present under his predecessor in 2008. The team performed slightly better during the second half of the season, but still only won a further 5 games, finishing well outside the 8 in 13th spot.

2010 started off equally as badly with the Raiders winning only 4 matches during the first 12 rounds. This continued to deteriorate with the team only winning 6 matches from the first 17 rounds. However a gutsy performance against Manly in Sydney proved to be the catalyst for a great run of form that resulted in the Raiders playing the best football they have played since 2003, including the first finals win in approximately 10 years. Terry Campese's knee injury during the match ended the fairy tale was not to be with Wests Tigers winning after a Jarrod Croker missed penalty that would have tied the match in front of a sold out Bruce Stadium.

The 2011 NRL season began with many experts predicting the Raiders to finish in the top 4 and be real premiership contenders. Though the team got off to almost the worst possible start, winning only 1 of its first 9 games with Furner claiming the dubious honour of coaching the team to the most consecutive losses in its history, with 8 straight defeats between round 2 and round 9 of that year. He found his position at the club under intense criticism from fans however his security was guaranteed by the club publicly. The season ended only marginally better than it started with the club ultimately only winning 6 games and finishing in second last place which was the worst result for the club since winning only 4 matches in its debut season in 1982. Furner lost his position three rounds before the conclusion of the 2013 season.

=== North Queensland Cowboys ===
In November 2013, Furner joined the North Queensland Cowboys as an assistant to head coach Paul Green.

On 4 October 2015, Furner was a member of the Cowboys' coaching staff in the side's 17-16 Grand Final victory over the Brisbane Broncos.

=== South Sydney Rabbitohs ===
In 2017, after three seasons at the Cowboys, Furner joined the South Sydney Rabbitohs as an assistant coach.

=== Leeds Rhinos ===
In September 2018, Furned signed a 3-year contract to return to Super League side Leeds Rhinos in the head coach role, a side he previously played for. After 5 wins and 11 losses combined during the 2019 Super League season and 2019 Challenge Cup, Furner had his contract with Leeds terminated.

=== Newcastle Knights ===
In September 2019, it was announced that Furner would be joining the Newcastle Knights as an assistant coach in 2020, under new Knights head coach Adam O'Brien.

=== Canterbury Bankstown Bulldogs ===
In October 2020, Furner moved to the Bulldogs as an assistant coach to newly-appointed head coach Trent Barrett.

== Sources ==
- Alan Whiticker & Glen Hudson (2007). The Encyclopedia of Rugby League Players. Wetherill Park: Gary Allen Pty Ltd. p. 176. ISBN 978-1-877082-93-1.
