= David Grant (rugby league) =

Australian rugby league footballer

Personal information
- Born: 11 January 1956 Trangie, New South Wales, Australia
- Died: 20 August 1994 (aged 38) Kyogle, New South Wales, Australia

Playing information
- Position: Prop, Second-row
Club
Years	Team	Pld	T	G	FG	P
1976	South Sydney	1	1	0	0	3
1977	Eastern Suburbs	1	0	0	0	0
1978–81	Balmain Tigers	50	8	0	0	24
1982–85	Canberra Raiders	77	9	0	0	32
	Total	129	18	0	0	59
- Source: As of 4 March 2018

David "Nana" Grant (1956–1994) was an Australian rugby league footballer originally from [Trangie], New South Wales. He played as a prop/back-rower in the 1970s and 1980s for a number of teams in the New South Wales Rugby Football League competition.

Grant originally from Trangie, NSW made his debut for the South Sydney Rabbitohs in 1976. The following year he moved to play for the Eastern Suburbs Roosters for one season, becoming the club's 678th capped player, before moving to spend four years with the Balmain Tigers. Grant toured NZ with a Combined Sydney side that year, then moved to the newly promoted Canberra club in 1982. He was the Raiders's first captain in its inaugural season in the New South Wales Rugby League premiership. Grant knocked out a member of the crowd (Peter Armstrong) in Ballina in 1992 when he was playing for Kyogle; Armstrong had abused him from Yobbos Hill at Kingsford Smith Park.

Grant died of a heart attack in Kyogle in 1994.

== Sources ==
- Whiticker, Alan; Hudson, Glen (2007). The Encyclopedia of Rugby League Players. Wetherill Park, New South Wales: Gary Allen Pty Ltd. p. 609. ISBN 978-1-877082-93-1.

Sporting positions
New creation	Canberra Raiders captain 1982	Succeeded by Allan McMahon
