= Canberra Raiders =

Australian rugby league football club

Club information
- Full name: The Canberra Raiders; Pty Limited
- Nickname(s): Raiders, The Green Machine, The Milk
- Short name: CAN
- Colours: Lime Green; White; Navy
- Founded: 30 March 1981; 45 years ago in Queanbeyan
- Website: raiders.com.au

Current details
- Ground: Canberra Stadium (25,011)
- CEO: Don Furner Jr
- Chairman: Dennis Richardson
- Coach: Ricky Stuart (NRL); Darrin Borthwick (NRLW)
- Captain: Joseph Tapine (NRL); Zahara Temara & Simaima Taufa (NRLW)
- Competition: National Rugby League
- 2026 season: 11th
- Current season

Uniforms
Home colours	Away colours

Records
- Premierships: 3 (1989, 1990, 1994)
- Runners-up: 3 (1987, 1991, 2019)
- Minor premierships: 2 (1990, 2025)
- NSW Cup: 1 (2003)
- Wooden spoons: 1 (1982)
- Most capped: 342 – Josh Papali'i
- Highest try scorer: 136 – Jarrod Croker
- Highest points scorer: 2374 – Jarrod Croker

The Canberra Raiders are an Australian professional rugby league football club based in the national capital city of Canberra, Australian Capital Territory. They have competed in Australasia's elite rugby league competition, the National Rugby League (NRL) premiership since it started in 1998, they were included in the NSWRL from 1982. Over this period the club has won three premierships from six Grand Final appearances and two minor premierships. Their most recent grand final appearance came in the 2019 NRL Grand Final, resulting in a 14–8 loss to the Sydney Roosters following a controversial overturned six-again call. Canberra currently have the second longest active premiership drought in the NRL which is 33 years. Canberra's current home ground is Canberra Stadium in Bruce. Previously, the team played home matches at Seiffert Oval in Queanbeyan, New South Wales, with the move to the Canberra Stadium in Bruce taking place in 1990. The official symbol for the Canberra Raiders is the Viking. The Viking, also a mascot at Raiders' games, is known as Victor the Viking.

As part of the New South Wales Rugby Football League premiership's first expansion outside Sydney, Canberra were admitted to the League, along with the Illawarra Steelers in the 1982 season. Over the following years they improved steadily, reaching a playoff for 5th in their third season, and becoming the first non-Sydney team to make the finals (1987), after this they would go on to feature in a grand final (1987) and win a premiership (1989). This heralded a period of great success for the club, with five grand Final appearances and three premierships in eight years. During this period, the Raiders boasted international players such as Mal Meninga, Laurie Daley, Ricky Stuart, Glenn Lazarus, Bradley Clyde, Gary Belcher, Brett Mullins and Steve Walters. After this came the Super League war, with the Raiders switching to the rebel competition before continuing to compete in the re-unified NRL. During the 2000s, Canberra suffered from an exodus of experience. At the beginning of the 2009 season, the Raiders squad contained only four players who had played at the representative level. Joel Monaghan and Terry Campese each represented the Australian side during the 2008 Rugby League World Cup, with Monaghan also playing for the NSW blues during the third game of the 2008 State of Origin series.

== History ==
At the beginning of the 1980s, the New South Wales Rugby Football League (NSWRFL) was looking to expand its Sydney-based premiership into other areas of the state. The Queanbeyan Blues rugby league team who was coached by Colin O'Rourke at the time was selected to form the Canberra franchise. The Canberra franchise was accepted in 1981 as the 14th team for the 1982 NSWRFL season. Along with the Illawarra Steelers who were also introduced that season, they became the first NSWRFL club based outside Sydney since the old Newcastle team left in 1909.

=== 1980s ===
The club's initial seasons were a mixed bag, with the team earning the wooden spoon in their debut year. The team was notorious for late game collapses, leading to the nicknames "Canberra Faders" and "Pine Lime Splices", in what was also a reference to the team's colours. In fact, no team has conceded more tries in a season than the 1982 Raiders. The first points recorded by the Raiders were scored by Peter McGrath, who went on to score 41 points in his first and only season with the Raiders. The club's first win, a 12–11 heartstopper against Newtown, came in its 8th match, and three more wins followed, most notably against then competition leaders Souths. 1983 saw 9 wins, more than doubling 1982's four. However, the team continued to struggle to win away from home. An away win first up in 1984 foreshadowed a much improved season, a positive winning record (13–11) snagging a playoff for fifth against South Sydney. But this game was lost (4–23), and Canberra had still not succeeded in reaching the semi-finals of the competition.

1985 saw regression, with the team winning only eight games (though the reserves did reach the Grand Final). Though 1986 was similarly disappointing, the team had a core group of players, such as Queensland trio Mal Meninga, Gary Belcher, Steve Walters, and John Ferguson who would greatly influence the coming decade.

This was the most successful period in the Raiders' short history, with five Grand Finals and three premierships. In 1987, the team finished third after the minor rounds, resulting in a maiden semi-finals appearance. Despite going down 25–16 in their first finals match against Eastern Suburbs, Canberra rallied to defeat South Sydney (46–12) and Easts again (32–24) in the Preliminary Final. The latter earned the team a place in the Grand Final, but they were never really competitive against minor premiers Manly-Warringah, going down 18–8 in what was the last Grand Final to be played at the Sydney Cricket Ground. The GF attracted a then Raiders all-time record attendance of 50,201 which would stand until 2019. Laurie Daley, Peter Jackson and Glenn Lazarus all made their debut for Canberra in 1987, though only Queensland State of Origin Centre Jackson played a prominent role that year, more so after his centre partner Meninga broke his arm and missed half of the season.

Chart of yearly table positions for Canberra Raiders in First Grade Rugby League

1988 featured free-scoring (over 100 tries in 22 games) and a number of large victories, with the team again finishing in third place on the ladder. Unfortunately, a narrow 19–18 loss against eventual premiers Canterbury-Bankstown in the Major Semi-final was followed by defeat against the Balmain Tigers and an early exit. After the debuts of Daley, Jackson and Lazarus in 1987, 1988 saw the debuts of future internationals Bradley Clyde, and former Wallaby scrum half, Queanbeyan born Ricky Stuart.

With 5 rounds to play in the 1989 season, Canberra were 7th and in danger of missing the semis. But a hard-fought 14–10 win over the Eastern Suburbs Roosters started a nine-match winning streak, culminating in the club's first Premiership. Throughout the finals, Canberra was forced to walk the sudden-death tightrope after sneaking into the finals in fourth place. They easily accounted for the Cronulla Sharks 31–10 in the Qualifying final, before defeating the emerging Penrith Panthers 27–18 in the semis. Then the Preliminary final, Canberra defeated the minor premiers the South Sydney Rabbitohs 32–16 to qualify for their second Grand Final appearance in three seasons.

In one of the all-time great Grand Finals against Balmain, Canberra sent the game into extra time after a late John Ferguson try that was converted by Meninga. Reserve forward Steve Jackson then scored the winning try to win the premiership for the Raiders in extra time after crashing through four Tigers defenders. Following the Grand Final win, the Raiders then went on to play in England at Old Trafford in the official World Club Challenge against Stones Bitter Championship winners Widnes. Widnes however, with their main strike weapon, Great Britain winger and the fastest player in rugby league at the time, Martin Offiah, in top form, defeated Canberra 30–18 in front of 30,768 fans.

Fullback Gary Belcher became the first Raider to be the NSWRL's leading point scorer in 1988 with 218 points (10 tries and 89 goals). 1989 also saw the Australian and Queensland fullback become the first Raider to lead the league in try scoring when he crossed for 17 tries. Belcher was also the first ever fullback to lead the try scoring list in a season.

=== 1990s ===
1990 was a stellar year for the club at all levels. All three grades making the Grand Final, with only the reserves losing. The first grade side earned their first Minor Premiership and a second consecutive title, defeating Penrith in the decider. Trouble brewed in 1991 as the club was embroiled in salary cap hardships. Nonetheless, a fourth Grand Final berth was secured – the team's third in a row. However, the team went down to Penrith in a repeat of the 1990 Grand Final. Jason Croker, the team's second longest serving player, debuted this year.

The fallout from the salary cap scandal saw several players leave the club, most prominently Glenn Lazarus, Brent Todd, David Barnhill, Nigel Gaffey, and Paul Martin. An average performance resulted, with the Raiders missing the finals for the first time since 1986. David Furner, son of former Raiders and Australian coach Don Furner, started out in this year.

Since their final premiership in 1994 which was a convincing win against Canterbury-Bankstown with some of the most spectacular tries ever seen in a grand final with the final score being 36–12. Canberra have been unable to scale their previous heights, largely due to their inability to lure representative players to the capital. The team bowed out in Round 1 of the 1996 finals series, losing to St. George. The next year, they were one of several teams that joined the breakaway Super League competition, losing in the preliminary final to the Cronulla-Sutherland Sharks. It was upon rejoining the newly formed National Rugby League the following year that the team began their decline. The Raiders' problems came to a head in the late 1990s, when club legends Ricky Stuart and Bradley Clyde were forced out in order to accommodate players such as Brett Finch. Finch would ironically leave the Canberra club soon after to play under Stuart, who has since returned to the club to be its head coach from 2014 onwards.

=== 2000s ===
The Raiders had mixed results in the new millennium, often finishing just inside or just outside the final eight and usually being bundled out of the finals in the early weeks, However, in 2003, the Raiders unexpectedly led the competition for most of the season, almost clinching the minor premiership. The Raiders then lost narrowly to the Melbourne Storm in the opening finals game, but still advanced to Week 2 due to ladder position. In one of the closest games in recent history, the Raiders were eclipsed by one point in the preliminary final by the New Zealand Warriors and eliminated from the 2003 competition.

Many fans believed the achievements of 2003 would be improved in the following years. However, the Raiders finished a disappointing 8th in 2004, being knocked out in week one of the finals by the Sydney Roosters. Club legends Ruben Wiki and Mark McLinden left the Raiders for other clubs in this year. Wiki's loss, in particular, was a bitter pill to swallow for many Raiders fans, as it was found that the New Zealand Warriors had significantly breached the salary cap in signing him (the Warriors eventually paid the price for this, being docked four competition points at the beginning of the 2006 season). The 2005 side was written off by fans and critics alike, as the club's two major signings, Jason Smith and Matt Adamson, were aging veterans considered well past their prime. However, both, particularly Smith, proved formidable campaigners, and the Raiders were joint competition leaders in Round 10. But as the season progressed, injuries took their toll and the Raiders finished second last on points differential to the Newcastle Knights. The Raiders started season 2006 heavy favourites to run last, but despite this pessimism and heavy losses to the Knights and the Roosters early on, fought back and guaranteed themselves a finals berth with a round to play.

2006 saw club stalwarts Simon Woolford, Clinton Schifcofske and the club's second longest serving player, Jason Croker, leave the club, going to St George Illawarra, the Queensland Reds rugby union team and the Super League club Catalans Dragons respectively. Outgoing backs Schifcofske and Adam Mogg both earned representative berths with Queensland in State of Origin. Saturday 9 September 2006 saw Jason Croker, Simon Woolford, Clinton Schifcofske, Michael Hodgson, Jason Smith and Adam Mogg all play their final games for the club. The round one finals series clash with the Bulldogs saw the Raiders defeated 30–12 in slippery and muddy conditions at Telstra Stadium, and eliminated from the 2006 premiership race. This was also the final match for coach Matthew Elliott, who was coaching Penrith in 2007. His replacement is former North Queensland Cowboys' assistant coach Neil Henry.

In 2007, the Raiders were an unknown quantity. Having lost star players such as Schifcofske, Smith, Croker and Woolford in key positions, the Raiders found themselves with a new captain in Alan Tongue relying on young, inexperienced players such as Todd Carney, William Zillman and Michael Dobson to step up and take on more prominent roles within the team. The sense of inexperience was reinforced by the selection of Neil Henry as coach, despite his lack of first-grade coaching experience. Though the Raiders were bolstered by late season signings Neville Costigan and Matt Bickerstaff, several critics believed that the Raiders' significant loss of experience would result in their "winning" the wooden spoon.

2007 was, overall, a disappointing season for the Raiders, who finished in 14th place despite entering the top 8 midway through the season. However, two players – Phil Graham for Country Origin and Neville Costigan for Queensland – achieved representative status. The season was notable for the difference in the team's performance at and away from home, with just 2 of their 9 wins occurring outside Canberra. Coach Neil Henry incurred a fine of $10 000 for questioning the impartiality of the referee after the round 19 clash.

The 2008 season started with some promise for the Raiders – a good showing despite a loss in round 1 vs. Newcastle was followed up with two solid wins against Penrith and St. George-Illawarra. The club then suffered a series of losses, whilst snaring only the occasional victory, with a big come from behind victory against Wests being noteworthy. In the representative field, Todd Carney and Joel Monaghan picked for Country Origin, and Monaghan being a shadow player for the New South Wales Side. In September 2008, despite a heavy injury toll, the Raiders guaranteed themselves a place in the NRL 2008 Finals Series winning seven of their last nine regular season games, a feat which was at the start of the season impossible according to Rugby League punditry in Australia. The Raiders semi-final appearance was brief, however. After being defeated by the Cronulla Sharks, the Raiders 6th-place finish was considered to be enough to get them a second chance. However, a huge upset with 8th place New Zealand defeating minor premiers Melbourne saw the Raiders eliminated.

The season had not been without controversy however, with star halfback Todd Carney and fullback Bronx Goodwin being stood down by the club after an altercation at a Canberra nightclub following the round 19 win against the Roosters. Carney was eventually dismissed by the club after failing to agree to the punishment plan the club had laid out for him, Goodwin was also sacked from the club.

A slow start to the 2009 season saw the raiders lose to the tigers and the roosters. However, with the help from under 20s debutants Josh Dugan, Jarrod Croker and Travis Waddell they won their next two matches. Despite a disappointing season for the raiders losing to many close games the Raiders were able to beat the Melbourne Storm for the first time in 14 games and 7 years 26–16 in round 16 to keep their slim finals hopes alive. The Raiders also had a memorable win over the number one team at the time St George-Illawarra Dragons, by 24–12. Despite wins against three of the top four (St George Illawarra Dragons, Gold Coast Titans and the Melbourne Storm) and coming within three points of the other (Canterbury-Bankstown Bulldogs) losses to bottom placed teams Cronulla Sharks and Sydney Roosters at home saw the raiders finish in 13th.

=== 2010s ===
The 2010 season began traditionally poorly for the Raiders with a loss to Penrith in the opening round however against early-season expectations that the Raiders would again struggle the club posted early season wins over Brisbane in round two, Parramatta in round five and the New Zealand Warriors in round eight in New Zealand in what was the club's first win in New Zealand since the early 2000s. However, losses to Todd Carney's new club the Roosters in round six and a narrow loss at home to the South Sydney Rabbitohs in round seven saw the club sitting second from last after round seven (last had the Melbourne Storm not been stripped of competition points due to salary cap breaches) of the 2010 season. Wins over the ladder-leading Dragons and the Gold Coast Titans followed until a four-game losing streak ensued; with the club sitting third from last after a round 17 home loss to the Roosters in what was Todd Carney's return to the nation's capital. The Raiders then began a run similar to that of Parramatta last year; winning eight of their next nine regular season matches to sneak into the top eight by season's end. The regular season's highest home attendance came when 20,445 fans filled Canberra Stadium to see the Raiders defeat the ladder-leading Dragons 32-16 for the second time in the season.

The Raiders advanced to the finals on the back of eight wins from their past nine and were drawn a tough away final against the second-placed Penrith Panthers whom the Raiders had beaten just five weeks earlier. The Raiders led from the start and despite lapses at times during the match the Raiders managed to sniff out a narrow 24–22 win, thus achieving its first final win in a decade, which ironically was also against the Panthers. This saw the Raiders draw a home final against the Wests Tigers in round two of the finals. Having lost to the Tigers twice during the regular season, it was hoped that a record crowd of 26,746 would inspire the Raiders to continue their fairytale run deep into the finals, however a missed penalty attempt by Jarrod Croker in the final minutes of the match saw Canberra lose by 26-24 and therefore draw a curtain on the Raiders' 2010 season. The Raiders off season didn't start well, with Joel Monaghan being sacked by the club for inappropriate behavior with a teammate's dog. This appeared to be a team building exercise, as photos surfaced showing the rest of the team cheering him on.

In 2011, the Raiders bolstered its already strong roster with the addition of Blake Ferguson, Brett White and former Dally M medalist Matt Orford. The latter signing was an important one for the Raiders as vice-captain and star playmaker Terry Campese is out indefinitely due to a knee injury suffered in the semi-final loss to Wests at the end of the 2010 season. After starting the season with a 40-16 thumping of the Cronulla-Sutherland Sharks in round one, the Raiders have since lost their last eight matches in succession, and were sitting at the bottom of the ladder by round nine. Their fortunes started to turn when they caused the boilover of the 2011 season, upsetting the Melbourne Storm in Melbourne by 20–12. This was Canberra's first win in the Victorian capital since 2000. This was tempered by being held scoreless for the first time at home in their history by Melbourne in round 19, losing 26–0. One other unlikely win to the Raiders against a 7th place Canterbury-Bankstown Bulldogs at home 20-12 has kept the momentum building as the Raiders look to turn their season around.

Canberra finished the 2012 NRL season in 6th position on the table and qualified for the finals. The club defeated the Cronulla-Sutherland Sharks in the qualifying final but were eliminated the following week by South Sydney in the semi-final.

The Raiders 2013 campaign began with two demoralising defeats to Penrith Panthers and Gold Coast Titans, only managing to score 10 points in the two games while conceding 68. Another early blow to the Raiders at the start of the 2013 season was the irresponsible behaviour of up and coming superstar Josh Dugan whom was sacked from the club for disciplinary reasons after he and teammate Blake Ferguson missed a team recovery session in favour of spending the day drinking on the rooftop of Ferguson's home. The Raiders then managed to win 5 of the next 7 games including upsets to the undefeated Melbourne Storm away from home and premiership favourites Sydney Roosters, winning all games played at Canberra Stadium for the first 12 rounds of the premiership season.

In 2014, Canberra hired Ricky Stuart as their new head coach. He had large success with the team. Star player, Anthony Milford, agreed to sign with rival team, Brisbane, disappointing Canberra fans. Canberra would finish the 2014 NRL season in 15th place, narrowly avoiding the wooden spoon.

In 2015, the Raiders finished 10th off the back of well below average defence.

In 2016, Canberra finished 2nd, for just the 3rd time in their history. They made the finals for the first time since 2012, Jarrod Croker broke the club point scoring record, they scored the most points for any Raiders team in a single season and they made a preliminary final for the first time since 1997. They eventually lost in the preliminary final 14–12 to the Melbourne Storm at Melbourne Rectangular Stadium.

In 2017, Canberra finished in 10th position with 11 wins and 13 losses.

In the 2018 NRL season, Canberra finished in 10th place on the table and missed out on the finals for the second consecutive season. The year was typified by the fact that the club could not hold onto a lead in many games throughout the season with the club losing games against Brisbane and Penrith despite being between 14 and 18 points ahead in both matches.

The 2018 NRL season saw one of the best starts by the club since the 1990s when they got off to a 5–1 record after the first 6 rounds. At the completion of round 21, Canberra sat in 3rd place with a record of 13 wins and 7 losses which was almost identical position on the ladder and win–loss record they had at the same stage of the 2016 season. 2019 saw the introduction and flying start to their careers for new fullback Charnze Nicoll-Klokstad and the club's 4th English recruit John Bateman both of whom were revelations for the club and were in contention for 'signing of the year'. After beating South Sydney in the preliminary final, Canberra qualified for their first Grand Final in 25 years against the Sydney Roosters.

In the 2019 NRL Grand Final against the Sydney Roosters, Canberra would go on to lose the match 14–8 in controversial circumstances at Stadium Australia. During the second half of the game and with only 10 minutes remaining, Canberra were initially given a new six tackle set after referee Ben Cummins had ruled that the Sydney Roosters had touched the ball. Canberra player Jack Wighton would then be tackled with the ball. Cummins later ruled that it was not a repeat set and it was a handover to the Sydney Roosters. In the following minutes, Roosters player James Tedesco would score a final try to end the game and result in the Sydney Roosters' 15th premiership.

=== 2020s ===
Canberra finished the 2020 NRL season in fifth place, narrowly missing out on fourth position. The season was heavily impacted by the COVID-19 pandemic in Australia, with teams operating under strict biosecurity restrictions and altered travel requirements. Canberra defeated Cronulla-Sutherland and the Sydney Roosters to reach the preliminary final against Melbourne Storm. Unlike Melbourne, who had been based in Queensland for much of the disrupted season, Canberra were required to travel in and out for the match before losing 30–10 at Suncorp Stadium.

Canberra entered the 2021 NRL season as one of the premiership favourites but endured an inconsistent campaign, finishing 10th and missing the finals.

In the 2022 NRL season, Canberra recovered from a poor start to finish 8th and upset the Melbourne Storm in the opening week of the finals before being eliminated by the Parramatta Eels.

In the 2023 NRL season, Canberra again reached the finals, finishing 8th before being eliminated by the Newcastle Knights in extra time. The defeat extended the club’s premiership drought to 30 seasons.

In the 2024 NRL season, Canberra finished 9th on the ladder, level on competition points with Newcastle but missing the finals due to inferior points differential. The club finished strongly with upset victories over Penrith Panthers and the Sydney Roosters.

In the 2025 NRL season, Canberra claimed the minor premiership for the first time since 1990 after finishing first on the ladder. Head coach Ricky Stuart was awarded the Dally M Coach of the Year. Despite entering the finals as premiership favourites, Canberra were eliminated in straight sets after losses to Brisbane and Cronulla. Their qualifying final against Brisbane was described as one of the greatest finals matches in the modern era, with several controversial officiating decisions in golden point. Following their minor premiership victory, the NRL drew criticism after presenting Canberra’s trophy while it remained partially wrapped in protective bubble wrap, an incident widely ridiculed by fans and commentators.

In the 2026 NRL season, Canberra entered the year aiming to build on their 2025 campaign but struggled for consistency through the opening 16 rounds. They did not qualify for the finals. Off the field, the Raiders intensified calls for a new rectangular stadium in Canberra, arguing that Canberra Stadium was outdated compared to newer NRL venues and lacked modern facilities needed for future growth. Otherwise, the club remains heavily associated with one of rugby league’s most controversial moments — the overturned six-again call in the 2019 NRL Grand Final by referee Ben Cummins, a decision still widely debated as a turning point in the match.

=== 2026 Ladder ===
Pos	Team	Pld	W	D	L	B	PF	PA	PD	Pts	Qualification
1	Penrith Panthers	24	18	0	6	3	683	347	+336	42	Advance to finals series
2	New Zealand Warriors	24	18	0	6	3	728	418	+310	42	Advance to finals series
3	Dolphins	24	17	0	7	3	662	506	+156	40	Advance to finals series
4	Sydney Roosters (P)	24	16	0	8	3	619	501	+118	38	Advance to finals series
5	Cronulla-Sutherland Sharks	24	14	0	10	3	672	523	+149	34	Advance to finals series
6	South Sydney Rabbitohs	24	14	0	10	3	694	581	+113	34	Advance to finals series
7	Newcastle Knights	24	14	0	10	3	633	591	+42	34	Advance to finals series
8	North Queensland Cowboys	24	13	0	11	3	568	652	−84	32	Advance to finals series
9	Manly Warringah Sea Eagles	24	11	0	13	3	623	524	+99	28	
10	Melbourne Storm	24	11	0	13	3	594	576	+18	28	
11	Canberra Raiders	24	11	0	13	3	581	626	−45	28	
12	Canterbury-Bankstown Bulldogs	24	11	0	13	3	476	536	−60	28	
13	Parramatta Eels	24	9	0	15	3	497	678	−181	24	
14	Brisbane Broncos	24	8	0	16	3	471	677	−206	22	
15	Wests Tigers	24	8	0	16	3	445	699	−254	22	
16	Gold Coast Titans	24	6	0	18	3	477	663	−186	18	
17	St. George Illawarra Dragons	24	5	0	19	3	392	717	−325	16	

Source: National Rugby League
Rules for classification: 1) competition points; 2) points differential; 3) percentage; (Note: Greater percentage of points scored for and against, being determined by points scored for divided by points scored against expressed as a percentage.) 4) tries scored; (Note: Further tiebreakers (in order) include goals scored, field goals kicked; least amount of penalties conceded.)
(P) Premiers

== Toyota Cup (Under 20s) ==
The Raiders' Toyota Cup team won 28–24 over the Broncos' team in golden point extra time to win the Toyota Cup (Under 20s) Premiership in the lead-up game to the NRL Grand Final on 5 October 2008. In 2009 the team was unsuccessful in defending its National Youth Competition title, finishing eighth at the end of the regular season. The team were able to upset the minor premiers Manly in week one of the finals but lost to the Wests Tigers in week two ending their title defence.

== Season summaries ==
P=Premiers, R=Runners-up, M=Minor Premierships, F=Finals Appearance, W=Wooden Spoons (Brackets Represent Finals Games)
Competition	Games Played	Games Won	Games Drawn	Games Lost	Ladder Position	P	R	M	F	W	Coach	Captain	Crowd Average	Details
1982 NSWRFL season	26	4	0	22	14th					♦	Rounds 1-17, 19-26 Don Furner; Round 18 Billy Sullivan	David Grant	10,852	1982 Canberra Raiders season
1983 NSWRFL Season	26	9	0	17	10th						Don Furner	Allan McMahon	9,798	1983 Canberra Raiders season
1984 NSWRL Season	24(1)	13(0)	0(0)	11(1)	6th				♦		Don Furner	Ron Giteau	10,639	1984 Canberra Raiders season
1985 NSWRL season	22	8	2	14	10th						Don Furner	Ron Giteau	7,833	1985 Canberra Raiders season
1986 NSWRL season	24	8	1	15	11th						Rounds 1−17, 19-26 Don Furner; Round 18 Allan McMahon	Dean Lance	6,851	1986 Canberra Raiders season
1987 NSWRL season	24(4)	15(2)	0(0)	9(2)	3rd		♦		♦		Don Furner & Wayne Bennett	Dean Lance	6,918	1987 Canberra Raiders season
1988 NSWRL season	22(2)	15(0)	0(0)	9(2)	3rd				♦		Tim Sheens	Dean Lance	9,988	1988 Canberra Raiders season
1989 NSWRL season	22(4)	14(4)	0(0)	8(0)	4th	♦			♦		Tim Sheens	Mal Meninga	9,241	1989 Canberra Raiders season
1990 NSWRL season	22(3)	16(2)	1(0)	5(1)	1st	♦		♦	♦		Tim Sheens	Mal Meninga	13,542	1990 Canberra Raiders season
1991 NSWRL season	22(4)	14(3)	0(0)	6(1)	4th		♦		♦		Rounds 1-10, 12-22 Tim Sheens; Round 11 Graham Rogers & Tim Sheens	Mal Meninga	14,587	1991 Canberra Raiders season
1992 NSWRL season	22	10	0	12	12th						Tim Sheens	Mal Meninga	11,103	1992 Canberra Raiders season
1993 NSWRL season	22(2)	16(0)	1(0)	5(2)	3rd				♦		Tim Sheens	Mal Meninga	14,569	1993 Canberra Raiders season
1994 NSWRL season	22(4)	17(3)	0(0)	5(1)	3rd	♦			♦		Tim Sheens	Mal Meninga	17,392	1994 Canberra Raiders season
1995 ARL season	22(2)	20(1)	0(0)	2(1)	2nd				♦		Tim Sheens	Ricky Stuart	15,683	1995 Canberra Raiders season
1996 ARL season	21(1)	13(0)	1(0)	7(1)	6th				♦		Tim Sheens	Ricky Stuart	10,440	1996 Canberra Raiders season
1997 Super League season	18(3)	11(1)	0(0)	7(2)	3rd				♦		Mal Meninga	Ricky Stuart	11,622	1997 Canberra Raiders season
1998 NRL season	24(2)	15(1)	0(0)	9(1)	7th				♦		Mal Meninga	Laurie Daley	10,135	1998 Canberra Raiders season
1999 NRL season	24	12	1	10	9th						Mal Meninga	Laurie Daley	12,057	1999 Canberra Raiders season
2000 NRL season	26(2)	15(1)	0(0)	11(1)	4th				♦		Mal Meninga	Laurie Daley	12,186	2000 Canberra Raiders season
2001 NRL season	26	9	1	16	11th						Mal Meninga	Simon Woolford	9,780	2001 Canberra Raiders season
2002 NRL season	24(1)	10(0)	1(0)	13(1)	8th				♦		Matthew Elliott	Simon Woolford	10,348	2002 Canberra Raiders season
2003 NRL season	24(2)	16(0)	0(0)	8(2)	4th				♦		Matthew Elliott	Simon Woolford	13,422	2003 Canberra Raiders season
2004 NRL season	24(1)	11(0)	0(0)	13(1)	8th				♦		Matthew Elliott	Simon Woolford	11,116	2004 Canberra Raiders season
2005 NRL season	24	9	0	15	14th						Matthew Elliott	Simon Woolford	12,404	2005 Canberra Raiders season
2006 NRL season	24(1)	13(0)	0(0)	11(1)	7th				♦		Matthew Elliott	Clinton Schifcofske	11,489	2006 Canberra Raiders season
2007 NRL season	24	9	0	15	14th						Neil Henry	Alan Tongue	11,512	2007 Canberra Raiders season
2008 NRL season	24(1)	13(0)	0(0)	11(1)	6th				♦		Neil Henry	Alan Tongue	11,913	2008 Canberra Raiders season
2009 NRL season	24	9	0	15	13th						David Furner	Alan Tongue	11,027	2009 Canberra Raiders season
2010 NRL season	24(2)	13(1)	0(0)	11(1)	7th				♦		David Furner	Alan Tongue	12,373	2010 Canberra Raiders season
2011 NRL season	24	6	0	18	15th						David Furner	Alan Tongue	12,419	2011 Canberra Raiders season
2012 NRL season	24(2)	13(1)	0(0)	11(1)	6th				♦		David Furner	Terry Campese, David Shillington	10,190	2012 Canberra Raiders season
2013 NRL season	24	10	0	14	13th						Rounds 1-21 David Furner; Rounds 22-24 Andrew Dunemann	Terry Campese, David Shillington, Josh McCrone	10,226	2013 Canberra Raiders season
2014 NRL season	24	8	0	16	15th						Ricky Stuart	Jarrod Croker	9,608	2014 Canberra Raiders season
2015 NRL season	24	10	0	14	10th						Ricky Stuart	Jarrod Croker	9,629	2015 Canberra Raiders season
2016 NRL season	24(3)	17(1)	1(0)	6(2)	2nd				♦		Ricky Stuart	Jarrod Croker	12,183	2016 Canberra Raiders season
2017 NRL season	24	11	0	13	10th						Ricky Stuart	Jarrod Croker	14,035	2017 Canberra Raiders season
2018 NRL season	24	10	0	14	10th						Ricky Stuart	Jarrod Croker	11,862	2018 Canberra Raiders season
2019 NRL season	24	15	0	9	4th		♦		♦		Ricky Stuart	Jarrod Croker, Josh Hodgson, Elliot Whitehead	14,864	2019 Canberra Raiders season
2020 NRL season	20	14	0	6	5th				♦		Ricky Stuart	Jarrod Croker, Josh Hodgson, Elliot Whitehead	4,572	2020 Canberra Raiders season
2021 NRL season	24	10	0	14	10th						Ricky Stuart	Jarrod Croker, Josh Hodgson, Elliot Whitehead	13,551	2021 Canberra Raiders season
2022 NRL season	24	14(1)	0	10(1)	8th				♦		Rounds 1-21, 23-finals week 2 Ricky Stuart; Round 22 Andrew McFadden & Brett White	Jarrod Croker, Joseph Tapine, Elliot Whitehead, Jack Wighton	13,028	2022 Canberra Raiders season
2023 NRL season	24	13	0	11	8th				♦		Ricky Stuart	Jarrod Croker, Elliot Whitehead	14,314	2023 Canberra Raiders season
2024 NRL season	24	12	0	12	9th						Ricky Stuart	Elliott Whitehead	14,102	2024 Canberra Raiders season
2025 NRL season	24	19	0	5	1st			♦	♦		Ricky Stuart	Joseph Tapine	16,442	2025 Canberra Raiders season
2026 NRL season	16	6	0	10	14th						Ricky Stuart	Joseph Tapine	TBC	2026 Canberra Raiders season

== Head-to-head records ==
Opponent	Played	Won	Drawn	Lost	Win %
Dragons	42	27	1	14	64.29
Rabbitohs	64	40	0	24	62.50
Titans	34	21	0	13	61.76
Tigers	48	27	0	21	56.25
Eels	68	36	0	32	52.94
Warriors	55	29	0	26	52.73
Cowboys	53	27	0	26	50.94
Knights	63	32	2	29	50.79
Dolphins	6	3	0	3	50.00
Sharks	87	43	0	44	49.43
Bulldogs	78	38	0	40	48.72
Panthers	85	39	1	45	45.88
Roosters	74	34	0	40	45.95
Broncos	60	24	1	35	40.00
Sea Eagles	68	26	1	41	38.24
Storm	57	18	0	39	31.58

=== Finals appearances ===
25 (1987, 1988, 1989, 1990, 1991, 1993, 1994, 1995, 1996, 1997, 1998, 2000, 2002, 2003, 2004, 2006, 2008, 2010, 2012, 2016, 2019, 2020, 2022, 2023, 2025).

== Emblem and colours ==
Canberra Raiders Logos

1981–1999

2000–2019

2020–2023

Since inception, the Raiders' team colours have been lime green and white with blue and gold bands. In recent years, the "away" strip for the team has been mostly white, with lime green, blue and gold bands. The lime green was chosen as the main colour as it differentiated the side from the colours of other clubs. The blue and gold were included in the Raiders colours as they are the traditional sporting colours of the Australian Capital Territory.

The original jersey's design was chosen through a competition held by the club in 1981. The winning entrant was Ms Patricia Taylor, whose design was duly adopted. The lime green colour was selected from the entry of David Lane, who had submitted a design with the team name of 'Canberra Cockatoos'.

Home jerseys of the Raiders

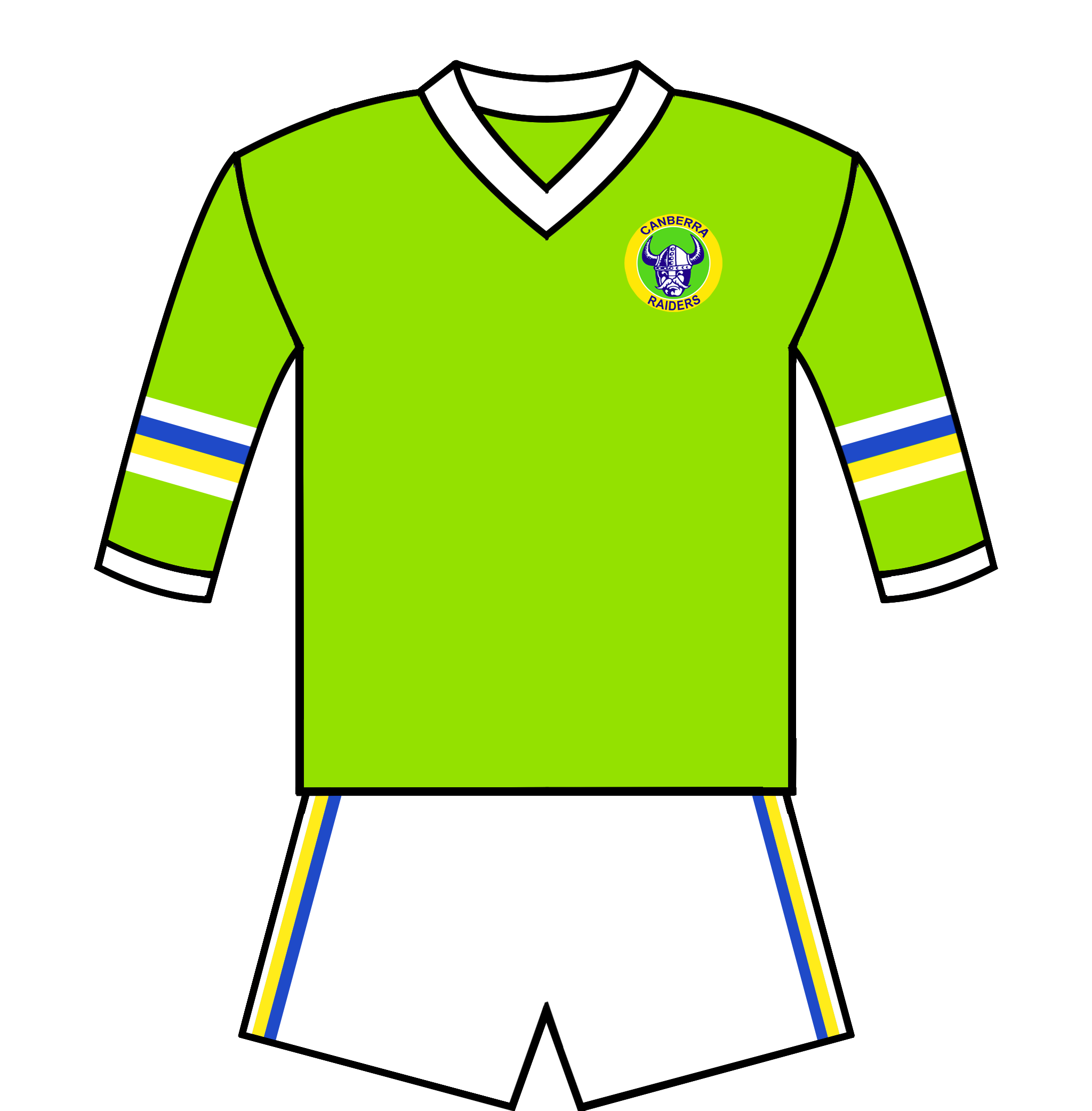
1982–1987

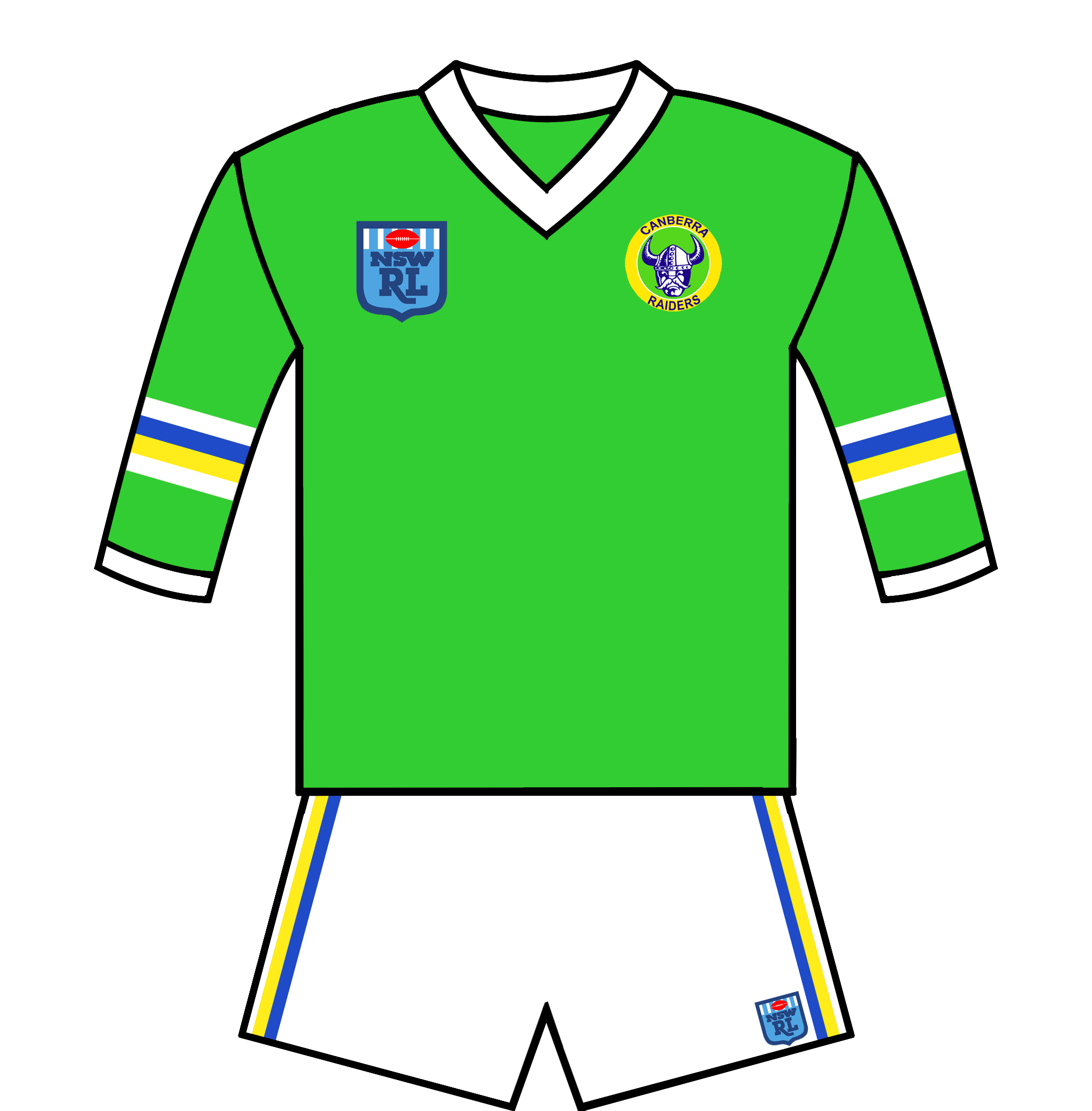
1988–1989

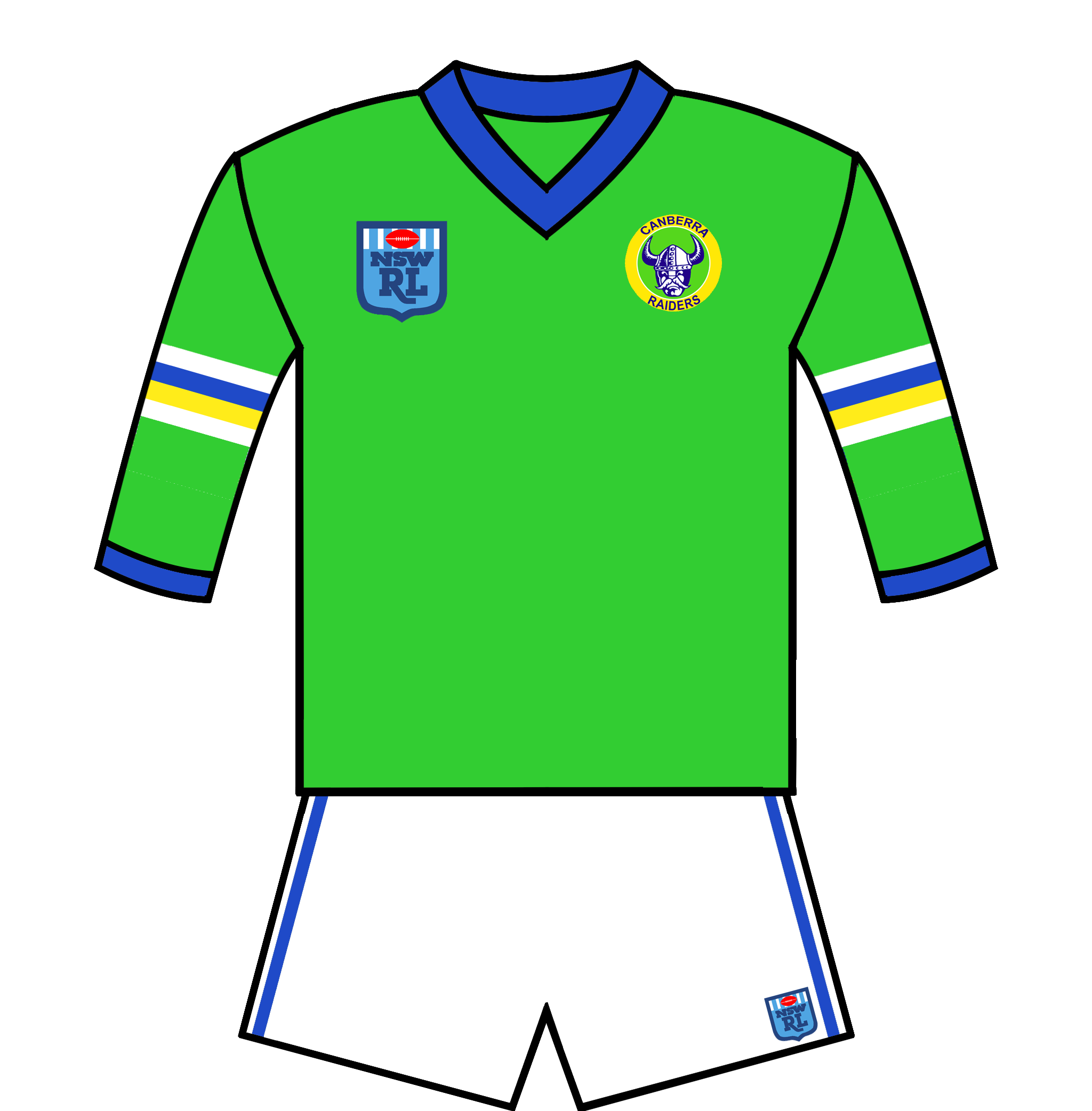
1990–1993

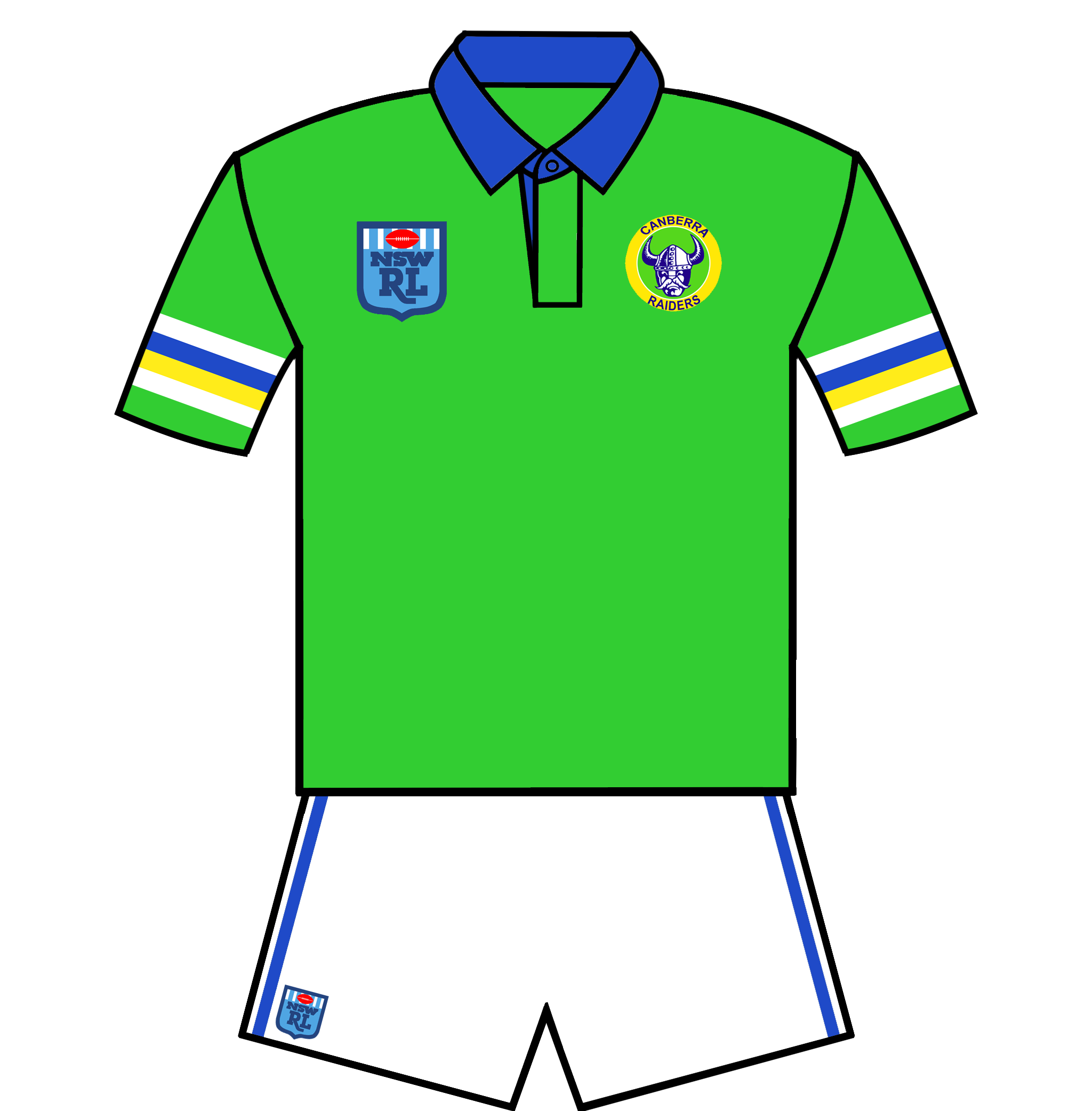
1994–1996

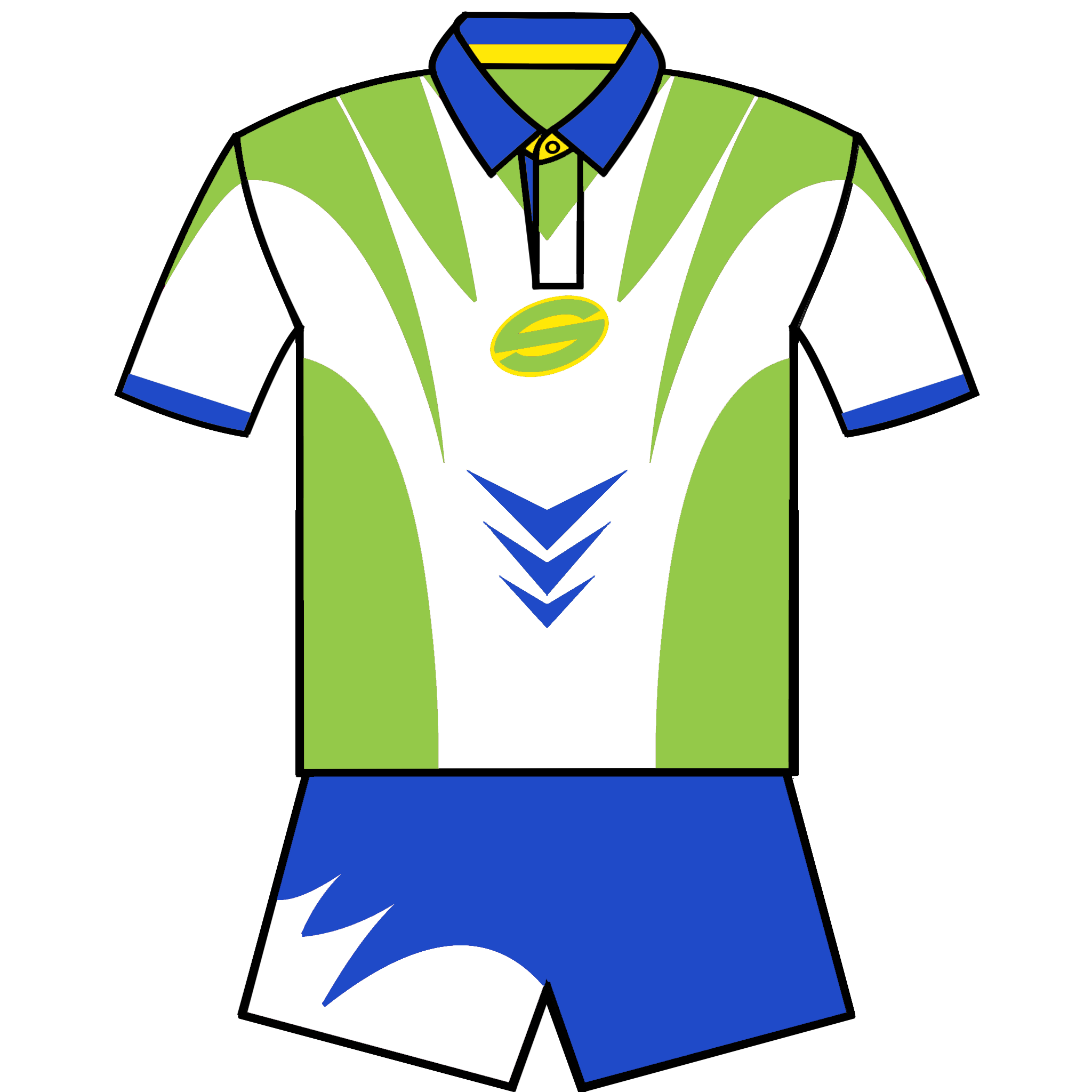
1997–1999

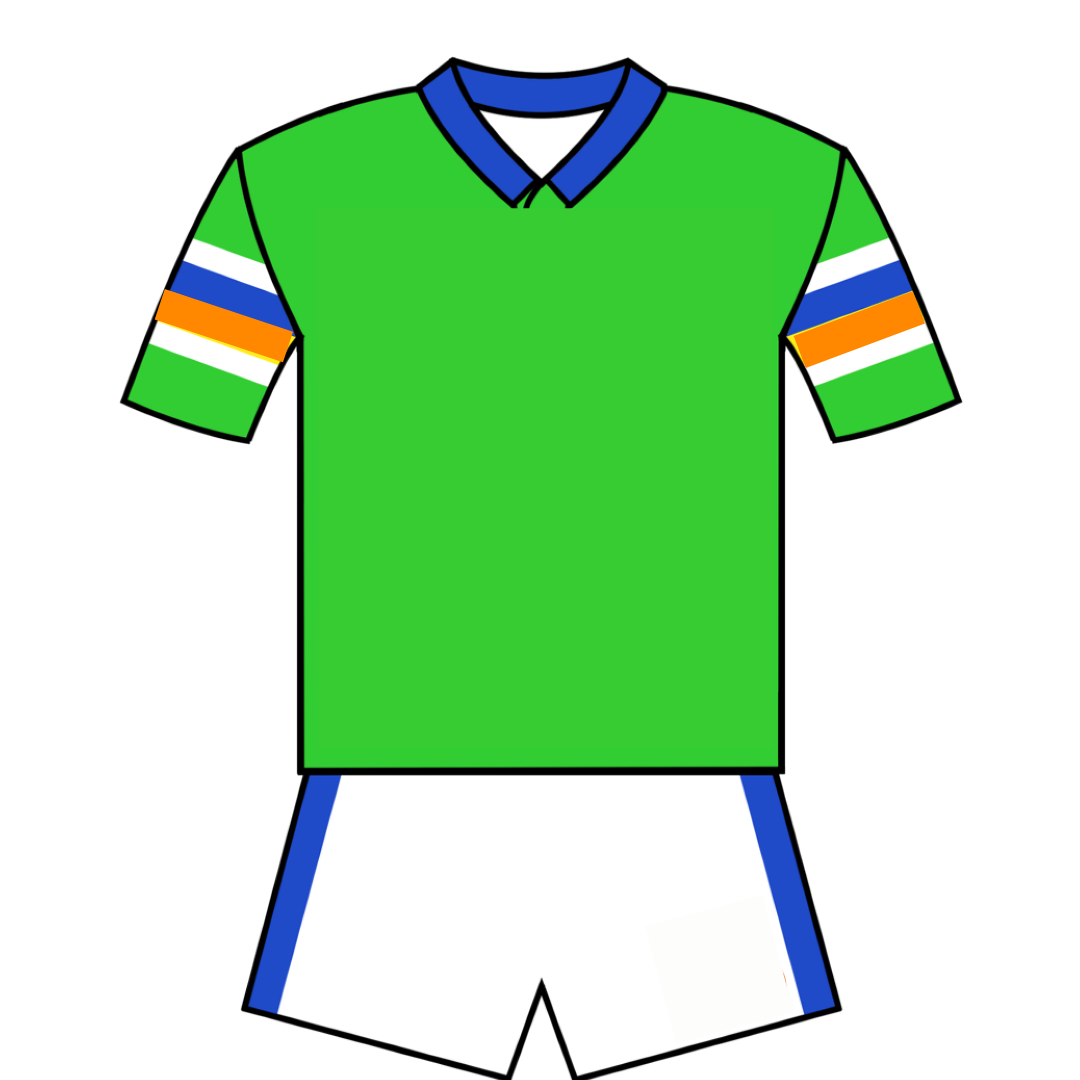
2023

=== Shirt sponsors and manufacturers ===
Year	Kit Manufacturer	Major Sponsor	Back Top Sponsor	Sleeve Sponsor	Back Bottom Sponsor	Front Shorts Sponsor	Back Shorts Sponsor	Chest Sponsor
1982	Classic Sportswear	-	-	-	-	-	-	-
1983-84	Classic Sportswear	Woodger’s	Woodger’s	-	-	-	-	-
1985-89	Peerless	Woodger’s	Woodger’s	-	-	-	-	-
1990	Peerless	Video Ezy	Video Ezy	Video Ezy	-	Video Ezy	-	-
1991	Canterbury of New Zealand	Video Ezy	Video Ezy	Video Ezy	-	Video Ezy	-	-
1992	Canterbury of New Zealand	Video Ezy	Video Ezy	Bega Cheese	-	Video Ezy	-	-
1993-94	Canterbury of New Zealand	Canberra Milk	Canberra Milk	Video Ezy	-	Canberra Milk	-	-
1995	Peerless	Canberra Milk	Canberra Milk	Video Ezy	-	Canberra Milk	-	-
1996	Peerless	News Classifieds	News Classifieds	Ansett Australia	-	News Classifieds	-	-
1997	Nike	Ansett Australia	-	Ansett Australia	-	-	-	-
1998	Nike	Oracle	-	Oracle	-	Oracle	-	-
1999	Classic Sportswear	Oracle	Oracle	Oracle	-	Oracle	-	-
2000-02	Puma	OzEmail	OzEmail	Compuware	-	OzEmail	-	-
2003	ISC	Fone Zone	Fone Zone	Compuware	-	Reward Insurance	Reward Insurance	-
2004	ISC	Fone Zone	Fone Zone	Compuware	-	Canberra Milk	Canberra Milk	-
2005-06	ISC	Fone Zone	Fone Zone	Aristocrat Leisure	-	Canberra Milk	Canberra Milk	-
2007-09	ISC	CFMEU	The Tradies	Local Liquor	Local Liquor	Canberra Milk	Canberra Milk	-
2010	ISC	CFMEU	The Tradies	Local Liquor	Local Liquor	Canberra Milk	Canberra Milk/ACT TAB	-
2011	ISC	The Tradies	The Tradies	Local Liquor	Local Liquor	Canberra Milk	Canberra Milk/ACT TAB	-
2012	ISC	Huawei	Huawei	Local Liquor	Local Liquor	Canberra Milk	Canberra Milk/ACT TAB	-
2013	ISC	Huawei	Huawei	Defence Housing Australia	Defence Housing Australia	Local Liquor	Local Liquor/ACT TAB	Abode Hotels
2014-15	ISC	Huawei	Huawei	Defence Housing Australia	Defence Housing Australia	Local Liquor	Local Liquor	Abode Hotels
2016	ISC	Huawei	McDonald’s	Defence Housing Australia	Defence Housing Australia	Denman Prospect	Denman Prospect/Austbrokers Canberra	TTM Security
2017-18	ISC	Huawei	Huawei	Dare Iced Coffee	McDonald’s	Denman Prospect	Denman Prospect/Austbrokers Canberra	ITP
2019-20	ISC	Huawei	Huawei	Dare Iced Coffee	Austbrokers Canberra	Denman Prospect	Denman Prospect/McDonald’s	ITP
2021	ISC	Canberra Milk	Huawei	Toyota Forklifts	Austbrokers Canberra	Denman Prospect	Canberra Airport/McDonald’s	ITP
2022	ISC	Toyota Forklifts	Toyota Forklifts	Canberra Milk	Palmerbet	Denman Prospect	Canberra Airport/McDonald’s	ITP
2023	ISC	Toyota Forklifts	Toyota Forklifts	-	Palmerbet	Denman Prospect	Canberra Airport/McDonald’s	Canberra Milk
2024	ISC	Toyota Forklifts	Toyota Forklifts	CDC Data Centres	Palmerbet	Denman Prospect	Canberra Airport/McDonald’s	Canberra Milk
2025	ISC	Toyota Forklifts	Toyota Forklifts	CDC Data Centres	Club Lime	AEI Insurance	Denman Prospect/McDonald’s	Canberra Airport
2026	Under Armour	Toyota Forklifts	Toyota Forklifts	CDC Data Centres	Club Lime	AEI Insurance	TBC	Canberra Airport

== Stadium ==
=== Seiffert Oval ===
From 1982 until the end of 1989, the Raiders played their home games at the Seiffert Oval located in Queanbeyan in New South Wales. They played their first game at the ground on 6 March 1982 against the Western Suburbs Magpies. the Magpies won this game 33–4 in front of 6,769 fans. The Raiders first win at Seiffert came on 18 April with a 21–11 win over 1981 Grand Finalists Newtown.

Overall, the Raiders would play 98 games at Seiffert Oval, winning 52, losing 45 with one drawn game. Canberra's largest attendance at Seiffert came in Round 12 of the 1989 season when 18,272 saw the Raiders triumph 27–6 over the Brisbane Broncos who were coached by former Raiders co-coach Wayne Bennett.

=== Bruce/Canberra Stadium ===
In 1990, the Canberra Raiders moved out of their original home and into the spacious Bruce Stadium which is located adjacent to the Australian Institute of Sport. The club has remained at Bruce Stadium (later renamed Canberra Stadium, then GIO Stadium due to current naming rights sponsorship) ever since. As of the end of the 2022 NRL season, the Canberra Raiders have played over 300 games at Canberra Stadium.

The Raiders attendance record at Canberra Stadium stands at 26,567 for a Finals week 3 clash against the South Sydney Rabbitohs in 2019. The Raiders beat Souths 16–10 to progress to their first Grand Final since 1994.

The club shares the ground with Super Rugby team the ACT Brumbies.

== Canberra Raiders Leagues Club ==
The Queanbeyan Leagues Club (QLC) was founded in 1963.

In December 1972, QLC was burnt to the ground and rebuilt a year later. As a part of the redevelopment, the famous "Blue Room" was built. The Blue Room became the place to go in the region with its silver service dining and musical entertainment. Also rebuilt was the QLC's auditorium, which brought headline acts to Queanbeyan including the Delltones and Johnny O'Keefe.

In 1989, the Auditorium was revamped and a nightclub was built. In 1982, the Canberra Raiders were established, and with them and their early success, QLC continued to grow in leaps and bounds.

The club is part of the Raiders Group which operate across the ACT and Queanbeyan and includes:

- Raiders Belconnen
- Raiders Gungahlin
- Raiders Mawson Club
- Raiders Weston

== 2026 squad ==
Canberra Raiders 2026 squad
Top 30 squad - 2026 NRL season			Supplementary list	Coaching staff
Michael Asomua – WG; Coby Black – HB; Jayden Brailey – HK; Jake Clydsdale – PR; Sione Finau – WG; Corey Horsburgh – LK; Zac Hosking – SR, LK; Sebastian Kris – CE; Daine Laurie – FB, FE; Ata Mariota – PR, SR	Myles Martin – LK; Noah Martin – SR; Matty Nicholson – SR; Josh Papali'i – PR; Owen Pattie – HK; Vena Patuki-Case – PR; Joe Roddy – LK; Ethan Sanders – HB; Simi Sasagi – CE; Xavier Savage – WG	Morgan Smithies – LK; Tom Starling – HK; Chevy Stewart – FB; Ethan Strange – FE; Jed Stuart – WG; Savelio Tamale – WG; Joseph Tapine (c) – PR; Matthew Timoko – CE; Kaeo Weekes – FB; Hudson Young – SR	Ethan Alaia – FE; Shaun Packer – HK; Mark Tuialii – CE; Jayze Tuigamala – LK; Extended squad: Jordan Uta – SR	Head coach: Ricky Stuart; Assistant coaches: Justin Giteau; Brock Shepperd; Eric Smith (Defence); Chris Lewis (NSW Cup Coach); Ash Barnes (Jersey Flegg Coach); Jeremy Braun (Elite Pathways Coach); Josh Miller (Contact Coach); Jarrod Croker (Outside Backs & Goal Kicking Coach); Medical professionals: Greg MacLeod (Club Doctor); Travis Ronaldson (NRL Strength & Power Coach/Club Dietitian); Leigh Woodbridge (NRL Rehabilitation Coach); Tom Christian (NRL Sports Scientist); Konrad Schultz (Head Physiotherapist); Isaac Priddis (Physiotherapist); Managers: Chris Hitchison (NRL Recruitment Manager); David Warwick (Senior Recruitment Officer); Josh Strahorn (NRL High Performance Manager); Tim Wykes (Pathways & Performance); Legend: (c) Captain(s); (vc) Vice-captain(s); Updated: 18 November 2026; Source(s): Raiders 2025 Squad Tracker

== Players ==
=== 25-Year Dream Team ===
This is the 25-man "Dream Team" picked in the Canberra Times to celebrate the club's 25th season in 2006

Canberra Raiders Dream Team
First team squad		Coaching staff
1 Sam Backo – PR; 2 Gary Belcher – FB; 3 Bradley Clyde – LK; 4 Gary Coyne – SR; 5 Laurie Daley – FE; 6 Brett Mullins – FB; 7 Chris O'Sullivan – FE; 8 Ruben Wiki – CE; 9 John Ferguson – WG; 10 David Furner – SR; 11 Ashley Gilbert – SR; 12 Jason Croker – LK; 13 David Grant – PR	14 Luke Davico – PR; 15 Ivan Henjak – HB; 16 Peter Jackson – CE; 17 Dean Lance – LK; 18 Glenn Lazarus – PR; 19 Noa Nadruku – WG; 20 Ken Nagas – WG; 21 Clinton Schifcofske – FB; 22 Ricky Stuart – HB; 23 Steve Walters – HK; 24 Simon Woolford – HK; 25 Mal Meninga (c) – CE	Head coach: Tim Sheens; Legend: (c) Captain(s); (vc) Vice-captain(s)

== Coaches ==
The Canberra Raiders' first coach was former Queensland and Australian representative player, Don Furner, who was coaching in Queanbeyan at the time of the club's formation in 1982. In 1987 he was joined by Wayne Bennett, who was coaching in Brisbane, and the Raiders reached their first grand final. In 2022, Ricky Stuart will become the longest-serving coach.

== Statistics and records ==
The Raiders' largest ever winning margin was 68 points, when they defeated the Parramatta Eels 68-0 during the 1993 NSWRL season. Their worst loss was in the 2013 NRL season when the Melbourne Storm dealt a 4–68 defeat. Canberra have won eleven consecutive games twice, in 1990 and in 1995.

Josh Papali'i has played the most games for the Raiders (327 games as of August 2025), surpassing the prior record holder Jason Croker in Round 14 of the 2025 NRL season. Croker, who played 318 games between 1991 and 2006 also holds the club's 2nd all-time try-scoring record with 120. Jarrod Croker is Canberra's highest ever point scorer with 2374 (136 tries, 915 goals) between 2009 and 2023. Jarrod Croker took out the award of highest point scorer in the NRL in 2012, 2015, and 2016. He was also awarded Dally M captain of the year in 2016.

== Honours ==
Premierships (3)

Year	Opponent	Competition	Score
1989	Balmain Tigers	Winfield Cup	19–14
1990	Penrith Panthers	Winfield Cup	18–14
1994	Canterbury-Bankstown Bulldogs	Winfield Cup	36–12

Runners Up (3)

Year	Opponent	Competition	Score
1987	Manly-Warringah Sea Eagles	Winfield Cup	18–8
1991	Penrith Panthers	Winfield Cup	19–12
2019	Sydney Roosters	NRL	14–8

Minor Premierships (2)

Year	Competition	Wins
1990	J. J. Giltinan Shield	16
2025	J. J. Giltinan Shield	19

=== Youth and pre-season ===
- NSWRL Premier League: 1

2003

- New South Wales Rugby League Club Championships: 1

1990

- Channel TEN Challenge Cup: 1

1990

- Tooheys Challenge Cup: 1

1993

- Jersey Flegg Cup: 2

1989, 1993

- Under-20s Competition: 1

2008

- Presidents Cup: 2

1990, 1995

- S.G. Ball Cup: 4

1995, 2003, 2005, 2021

- Harold Matthews Cup: 4

1978, 1984, 1993, 1995

== Supporters ==
The Canberra Raiders receive support from groups of fans, including supporter's website, podcast and news service "Raidercast"; and forum "The Greenhouse".

Canberra fans became widely known for the Viking War Horn and 'Viking Thunder Clap', a nod to the Viking chant recently made famous by fans of the Iceland national football team.
