= Matthew Elliott (rugby league) =

Australian RL coach and former rugby league footballer

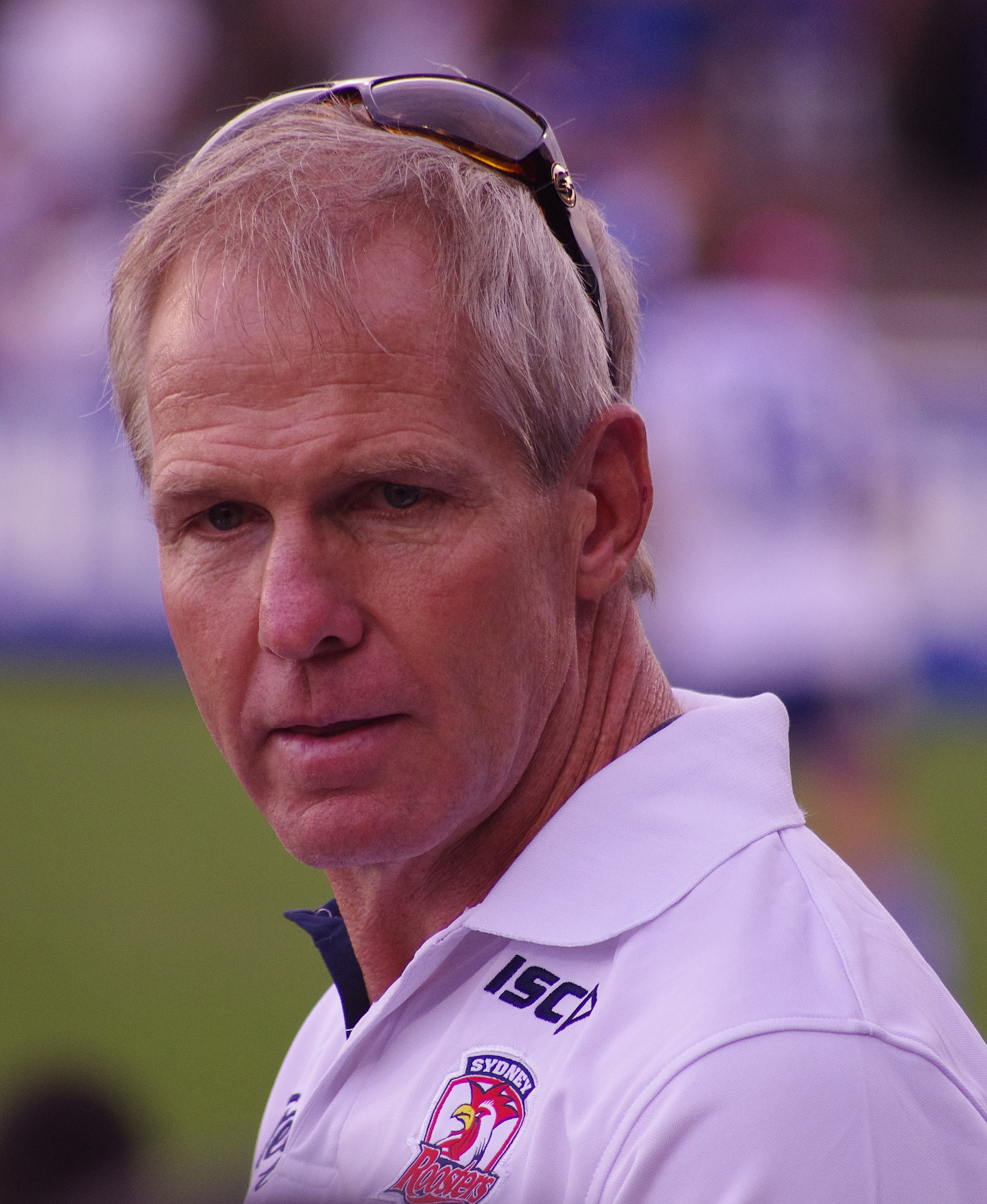
- Elliott in 2012

Personal information
- Born: 8 December 1964 (age 61) Thursday Island, Queensland, Australia

Playing information
- Height: 180 cm (5 ft 11 in)
- Position: Second-row
Club
Years	Team	Pld	T	G	FG	P
1989–92	St. George	62	8	0	0	32

Coaching information
Club
Years	Team	Gms	W	D	L	W%
1997–00	Bradford Bulls	133	92	4	37	69
2002–06	Canberra Raiders	125	59	1	65	47
2007–11	Penrith Panthers	111	49	2	60	44
2013–14	New Zealand Warriors	29	13	0	16	45
	Total	398	213	7	178	54
Representative
Years	Team	Gms	W	D	L	W%
2001–11	United States	4	2	0	2	50

Matthew Elliott (born 8 December 1964) is an Australian professional rugby league football coach, commentator and former player. He has previously coached in the NRL with the Canberra Raiders, Penrith Panthers and the New Zealand Warriors, as well the Bradford Bulls in the Super League and the United States national team.

== Playing career ==
Born on Thursday Island, Elliott grew up in Townsville in far north Queensland.

Elliott played for Bondi United and was an Eastern Suburbs Roosters lower grade player.

Between 1989 and 1992, Elliott played 61 games for the St. George Dragons. At the end of the 1992 NSWRL season, Elliott played for the Dragons off the bench in their grand final loss against the Brisbane Broncos.

== Coaching career ==
Injury cut Elliott's playing career short and he became an assistant to Brian Smith at the Dragons.

=== Bradford Bulls ===
Elliott followed Smith to the Bradford Bulls in 1996, before taking over as head coach. Elliott won the Super League title in his first season in 1997. He coached the Bulls to the 1999 Super League Grand Final which was lost to St. Helens. He also coached the Bulls to a Challenge Cup win in 2000.

=== Canberra ===
After serving as assistant to Canberra Raiders coach Mal Meninga during the 2001 NRL season, Elliott was made coach for the 2002 premiership. During his tenure at the Raiders, Canberra won 59 and drew one of their 125 games, including four finals appearances in five seasons.

Elliott's most successful coaching season was 2003, when the Raiders won 16 of 24 games but were eliminated from the finals without winning a game.

=== Penrith ===
On 19 February 2006, it was announced that Elliott would coach the Penrith Panthers from 2007 onwards, having signed a three-year deal. Elliott succeeded John Lang in this position.

In September 2008, Elliott was criticised for Penrith's consistent poor showings and it was speculated that he would be prematurely sacked before he saw through his three-year contract with the club. Elliott however defied the pressure and criticism and managed to convince the board into letting him remain in charge for the 2009 NRL season.

After a promising start to the 2009 season, Elliott's contract was extended to the end of the 2011 NRL season. In the 2010 NRL season, the Panthers finished second in the ladder, but they did not win a match in the finals series. Their 645 was the most points scored in the regular season, the second highest being 559.

On 25 April 2011, Elliott was informed by the Penrith board that his services would not be required beyond 2011. He vowed to continue at the helm for the rest of the season at the time, then on 20 June announced his resignation with immediate effect.

=== United States ===
Elliott was the coach of the United States national side in 2001 and 2011. Following the 2011 NRL season, Elliott coached the United States team to a 40–4 victory over Jamaica to qualify for the 2013 Rugby League World Cup, their first ever.

Elliott has served as coach three separate occasions, recording a 40–4 win against South Africa in 2001, a 40–4 win v Jamaica in 2011 and just one narrow 16–18 defeat to Canada on 18 Sep 2011.

=== Sydney Roosters ===
In 2012, Elliott served as Sydney Roosters assistant coach, again working under Brian Smith.

=== New Zealand Warriors ===
On 12 October 2012, Elliott was appointed head coach of the New Zealand Warriors for two seasons, replacing Brian McClennan who was sacked during the 2012 New Zealand Warriors season. He resigned as the USA coach before the 2013 Rugby League World Cup, to concentrate on the Warriors' off season. On 7 April 2014, he was sacked from the Warriors.

=== St. George Illawarra Dragons ===
On 28 September 2020, it was announced that Elliott would be an Assistant coach to new Dragons Head Coach Anthony Griffin commencing in 2021. In 2022, Mat Head replaced Elliott as assistant coach. Elliott remained with the club in a "leadership and culture development role."

== Commentary career ==
From 2015, Elliott has been part of the ABC Radio Grandstand commentary team.
