= Allan McMahon =

Australian RL coach and former Australia international rugby league footballer

Personal information
- Full name: Allan McMahon
- Born: 9 August 1954
- Died: 24 May 2003 (aged 48) Wollongong, New South Wales, Australia

Playing information
- Height: 187 cm (6 ft 2 in)
- Weight: 99 kg (15 st 8 lb)
- Position: Three-quarter, Fullback
Club
| Years | Team | Pld | T | G | FG | P |
|---|---|---|---|---|---|---|
| 1975–81 | Balmain Tigers | 110 | 28 | 10 | 0 | 104 |
| 1982 | Newtown Jets | 22 | 8 | 0 | 0 | 24 |
| 1983 | Canberra Raiders | 18 | 5 | 0 | 0 | 20 |
| 1983–84 | Featherstone Rovers | 9 | 0 | 0 | 0 | 0 |
| | Total | 159 | 41 | 10 | 0 | 148 |
Representative
| Years | Team | Pld | T | G | FG | P |
| 1975–77 | Australia | 5 | 4 | 0 | 0 | 12 |

Coaching information
Club
| Years | Team | Gms | W | D | L | W% |
| 1986 | Canberra Raiders | 1 | 1 | 0 | 0 | 100 |
| 1988–91 | Newcastle Knights | 81 | 33 | 6 | 42 | 41 |
| 1996 | Illawarra Steelers | 22 | 8 | 0 | 14 | 36 |
| | Total | 104 | 42 | 6 | 56 | 40 |

Allan McMahon (9 August 1954 – 23 May 2003), known by the nickname "Macca", was an Australian professional rugby league footballer and coach. He was an Australian test player and was a coach of the Canberra Raiders, Newcastle Knights and Illawarra Steelers.

== Playing career ==
McMahon played a total of 148 games for the Balmain Tigers of whom he also captained on numerous occasion. He also played for the Newtown Jets, the Canberra Raiders and was a member of the 1978 Kangaroo tour squad.

== Coaching career ==
After coaching the Raiders in their fifth season in 1986, McMahon was the first coach of the Knights, who joined the NSWRL in 1988. He resigned during the 1991 season, and later coached the Illawarra Steelers. Despite signing a three-year contract, he was sacked at the end of the 1996 season, his first at the club.

Allan McMahon died in May 2003, at his home in Wollongong, aged 48.

== Sources ==
- Gary Lester, ed. (1983). The Sun Book of Rugby League – 1983. Sydney, New South Wales: John Fairfax Marketing. p. 16. ISBN 0-909558-83-3.
- Alan Whiticker & Glen Hudson (2007). The Encyclopedia of Rugby League Players. Wetherill Park, New South Wales: Gary Allen Pty Ltd. pp. s 386–387. ISBN 978-1-877082-93-1.

Sporting positions
| Preceded by David Grant | Canberra Raiders captain 1983 | Succeeded by Ron Giteau |
