= Don Furner =

Australian rugby league footballer and coach (1932–2020)

Personal information
- Born: 26 December 1932 Condobolin, New South Wales, Australia
- Died: 24 February 2020 (aged 87) Weston, Canberra, Australian Capital Territory, Australia

Playing information
- Position: Forward
Club
Years	Team	Pld	T	G	FG	P
1951–53	Souths (Toowoomba)
Representative
Years	Team	Pld	T	G	FG	P
19??–??	Queensland
1956	Australia	1	0	0	0	0

Coaching information
Club
Years	Team	Gms	W	D	L	W%
1965–69	Queanbeyan
1970–72	Eastern Suburbs	69	40	2	27	58
1973–81	Queanbeyan
1982–87	Canberra Raiders	153	59	3	91	39
	Total	222	99	5	118	45
Representative
Years	Team	Gms	W	D	L	W%
1986–88	Australia	15	13	0	2	87
2000	Fiji	3	1	0	2	33
- Source: Rugby League Project
- Relatives: David Furner (son)

Don Furner (26 December 1932 – 24 February 2020) was an Australian rugby league footballer and coach. As a player, he represented Queensland on nine occasions and also toured with the 1956–57 Kangaroos. He began his coaching career at Tumbarumba in 1960 leading the to a primership in his first year defeating Yenda13-8 in a replay.Made the grand goal 1961 defeated by Wagga Kangaroos & also lost the 1962 grand final Griffith black & whites.After the 1963 season left Tumbarumba He was player coach with Junee in 1964. That year, the team won their first Group 9 grand final as well as the Maher Cup. In 1965, he began coaching the Queanbeyan Blues, guiding that club to three successive Group 8 premierships (1965–67) and a further two Grand Finals (1968–69). He coached the Eastern Suburbs Roosters (1970–72), whom he took to the 1972 NSWRFL season's premiership final. He returned to the Queanbeyan Blues from 1973 to 1981, his team reaching the Grand Final in each of those nine seasons, including six premierships and a Clayton Cup win in 1974.

Furner then became the first coach of the newly formed Canberra Raiders. Furner also coached the Canberra club to the 1987 NSWRL season's Grand Final. He later joined Parramatta for the 1985 NSWRL season. He was appointed the Australian national coach from 1986 to 1988. He coached the NSW Country team and two Group 20 clubs, Narrandera Lizards in 1998 and Yanco Wamoon Hawks in 2005. He took the latter to the 2005 Group 20 grand final, which they lost to West Wyalong.

His sons are David Furner who used to be a player and coach of the Canberra Raiders and Don Furner, Jr. who became the Canberra Raiders' CEO. Furner died on 24 February 2020, aged 87.
