= Neil Henry =

Australian RL coach and former rugby league footballer

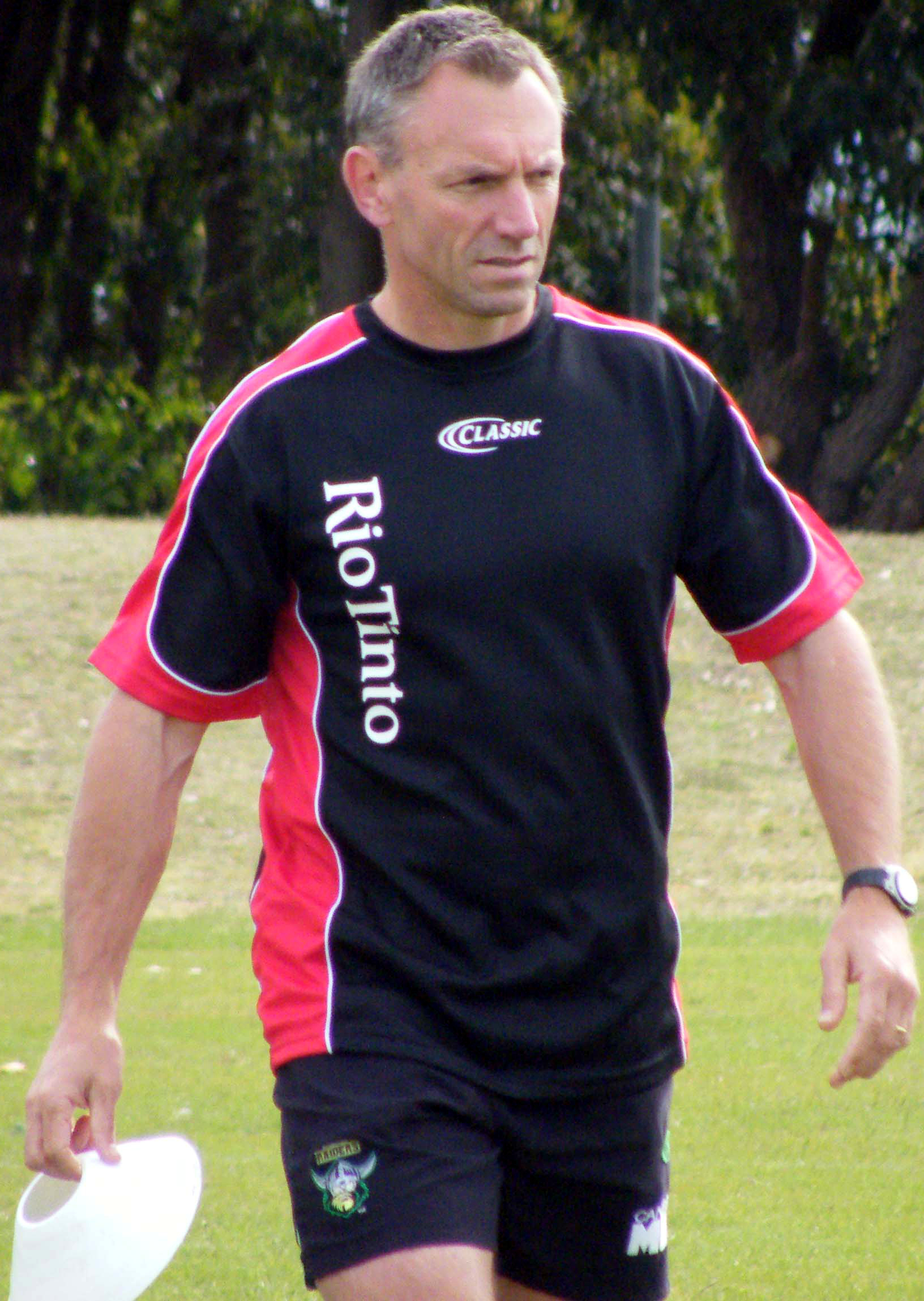

Personal information
- Born: 23 January 1961 (age 65) Hobart, Tasmania, Australia

Playing information
- Position: Five-eighth
Club
Years	Team	Pld	T	G	FG	P
1988–89	Hull FC	8	1	0	0	4

Coaching information
Club
Years	Team	Gms	W	D	L	W%
2007–08	Canberra Raiders	49	22	0	27	45
2009–13	North Qld Cowboys	124	59	0	65	48
2014–17	Gold Coast Titans	75	28	0	46	37
	Total	248	109	0	138	44
Representative
Years	Team	Gms	W	D	L	W%
2008	Dreamtime Team	1	1	0	0	100
2010	Indigenous All Stars	1	1	0	0	100
2018–	Junior Kangaroos	2	2	0	0	100

Neil Henry (born 23 January 1961) is an Australian professional rugby league football coach and former player. He was formerly the head coach for the Canberra Raiders, North Queensland Cowboys and Gold Coast Titans of the National Rugby League. He has been described as, "one of the game's best tacticians."

== Career ==
Henry was a foundation player of the Raiders, having played for the club from 1982 and 1984 in the lower grades. After a succession of player-coach positions at local clubs in the Canberra and Cooma in the Group 8 and 16 competitions, he was made coach of the Perth Reds' Under 19 team in 1997, before coaching Raiders SG Ball and Jersey Flegg teams between 1999 and 2002. He played for Hull FC in England for one season.

He was previously the assistant coach of the North Queensland Cowboys between 2003 and 2006 under Graham Murray and assistant to Mal Meninga in the Queensland State of Origin team from 2006 to 2009.

In his first season as an NRL head coach, Henry incurred a fine of $10,000 for Canberra by questioning the impartiality of the referee following a round 19 loss to Melbourne Storm in 2007. A supporters led fundraiser raised the money within days and was donated to charity.

Henry was named Dally M Coach of the Year for 2008, ahead of other nominees Craig Bellamy, Ricky Stuart and Des Hasler.

In October, 2009, Henry returned to Townsville, Queensland to take over from Ian Millward as head coach of the North Queensland Cowboys. He was also coach of the Indigenous Dreamtime team who played the Welcome to Country game against a NZ Maori team before the 2008 Rugby League World Cup.

Henry coached the Indigenous All Stars in the inaugural All Stars match in 2010, with the Indigenous All Stars prevailing 16–12.

In 2010, Henry was an assistant coach of the PM XIII team that played PNG. In 2010, Henry had a lean year as North Queensland won just five out of its 24 games, only avoiding the wooden spoon after Melbourne were stripped of its premiership points for salary cap breaches. In 2011, Henry was able to turn it around by winning 14 games.

Henry was a finalist for Dally M coach of the year in 2011.

However, on 29 July 2013, Neil Henry was informed by the North Queensland Cowboys chairman, Laurence Lancini, that his services would no longer be needed in 2014 despite the club making the finals three years in a row.

On 28 September 2013, it was announced that the former North Queensland mentor signed with Gold Coast Titans as an assistant coach. He was elevated to the role of interim coach after John Cartwright tendered his resignation following a disappointing 2014 season for the club.

On 17 August 2014, Henry coached his first game with the Gold Coast Titans in a 15–12 defeat by the Manly-Warringah Sea Eagles on the Gold Coast.

On 21 August 2017, Henry was sacked from his position as head coach of the Gold Coast Titans. The sacking came in the wake of a highly publicised feud between Henry and the then Gold Coast player Jarryd Hayne.

2018 saw Henry return to representative coaching, taking the Junior Kangaroos to a win over the Junior Kiwis. In 2019 Henry was coach of an Australia A (under 23) team which defeated a French team 62–4 in Wollongong. In 2019, Henry began work for the NRL acting as a coaching consultant. Henry re-joined the Queensland State of Origin staff in 2020 as an assistant coach to Wayne Bennett in their series win over NSW. In 2021, he will be assistant to Paul Green.
