= 2007 Melbourne Storm season =

- NRL Rank: 1st
- Play-off result: Grand Final Winners
- 2007 record: Wins: 21; draws: 0; losses: 3
- Points scored: For: 627; against: 277

Team information
- CEO: Brian Waldron
- Coach: Craig Bellamy
- Captain: Cameron Smith (14 Games) Cooper Cronk (5 Games) Matt Geyer (5 Games) Matt King (2 Games) Dallas Johnson (1 Game)
- Stadium: Olympic Park
- Avg. attendance: 11,711
- High attendance: 14,066 (Round 9)

Top scorers
- Tries: Israel Folau (21)
- Goals: Cameron Smith (88)
- Points: Cameron Smith (192)
| ← 2006 | List of seasons | 2008 → |

The 2007 Melbourne Storm season was the 10th in the club's history. They competed for NRL's 2007 Telstra Premiership, finishing the season in 1st place to claim the minor premiership before going on to reach the 2007 NRL grand final, their third. In the grand final the Storm defeated the Manly-Warringah Sea Eagles to claim their second premiership. However two years after the event Melbourne were stripped of their 2007 titles after being found guilty of long-term salary cap breaches.

The most successful season in the club's history as the team managed 21 wins on their way to winning the NRL Grand Final. Storm's success was built on the back of incredibly strong defence. Craig Bellamy's men conceded just 11.5 points per game, the best defensive season in the club's history. The year began with seven straight wins and by Round 12 Melbourne had moved into first place, where they remained for the rest of the season. Storm earned redemption from the 2006 Grand Final loss by beating the Broncos 40–0 in the Qualifying final. They faced Manly in the decider, running away with a 34–8 victory as Greg Inglis scored a double on the night to be awarded the Clive Churchill Medal. Cameron Smith increased his standing as the best player in the game by being awarded the Golden Boot after being named the International Player of the Year while Israel Folau set an NRL rookie record, scoring 21 tries for the season.

== Season summary ==
- 15 January – The drawn-out battle over the services of Melbourne winger Steve Turner is finally resolved when new NRL team the Gold Coast Titans agree to release him from his contract. "It would have been devastating [to leave]," Turner said. "I feel like I’ve come all this way with the Storm and leaving now would have been really hard to handle." Storm rookies Smith Samau and Daniel Isaac are 'traded' to the Titans as compensation for the loss of Turner.
- 3 March – In the club's first trial match played in metropolitan Melbourne, Storm thrash 2006 premiers Brisbane Broncos 46–0 in a well-attended game at the club's training base Princes Park.
- 14 March – The club confirms that Cooper Cronk and Dallas Johnson will join the captaincy group for the season, following the departures of David Kidwell and Scott Hill.
- Round 1 – Israel Folau becomes the youngest player to play for the club, making his debut at just 17 years and 347 days. Folau scores a try in a tight 18–16 win against Wests Tigers, with the goalkicking of Cameron Smith proving the difference on the scoreboard.
- Round 5 – Melbourne get off to their best start to a season, winning their fifth straight game.
- Round 6 – Playing his second game in 24 hours, Cameron Smith scores a double and five goals in a commanding performance against Penrith Panthers.
- 3 May – Craig Bellamy coaches the NSW Country representative team in the annual City vs Country Origin held in Coffs Harbour.
- Round 8 – Melbourne suffer their first loss of the season, going down 30–12 against Wests Tigers at Gosford.
- Round 10 – Despite the loss of five players to State of Origin duty, Melbourne trounce bottom-placed Sydney Roosters 26–2, holding the Roosters tryless.
- Round 11 – In a top of the table clash at Brookvale Oval, former Storm halfback Matt Orford kicked the decisive field goal to give Manly Warringah Sea Eagles a dramatic 13–12 win over Melbourne. Coach Craig Bellamy could not fault the team's effort, but was critical of some options taken when the match was in the balance, saying "we were very brave, but very dumb".
- Round 13 – In the lowest scoring game for 14 years, Melbourne score a late try to win 4–2 against the New Zealand Warriors in Auckland. Missing nine regular players, including six on State of Origin duty, Melbourne trailed 2–0 for much of the game played in cold and wet conditions. Midseason signing Clint Newton made his debut for the club, becoming the 100th player to play for the club; while Matt Rua played his first NRL game since 2002.
- Round 14 – Melbourne march to a 40–4 halftime lead against North Queensland Cowboys, going on to win 58–12, eclipsing the highest score posted by the club against the Cowboys. Matt Geyer scores his 100th NRL try, becoming the first Melbourne player to reach that milestone.
- 22 June – As part of the club's 10-year celebrations, a 17-man team of the decade is announced at a gala presentation held at The Great Hall of the National Gallery of Victoria.
- Round 15 – Celebrating the club's 10th birthday with fireworks and cake postgame, Melbourne dominate St George Illawarra Dragons 28–6.
- 10 July – Crowd favourite Matt King announces he will be leaving Melbourne at the end of the season to join Super League club Warrington Wolves on a lucrative four-year deal.
- Round 18 – Midseason signing Clint Newton scores a try against former club Newcastle Knights as Melbourne thrash Newcastle 44–0. Billy Slater, Steve Turner, and Anthony Quinn all score double in the big win, with Newton saying the victory was "sweet (to beat) someone that wasn't playing tonight" referring to Knights coach Brian Smith.
- Round 20 – A poor attitude was blamed as Melbourne suffered a 26–16 defeat against the previously hapless Sydney Roosters, under caretaker coach Brad Fittler. Melbourne had rested Matt Geyer and Ryan Hoffman from the match.
- Round 21 – Behind 14–0 after 30 minutes, Cooper Cronk lands a late field goal to secure a 17–16 win over Cronulla-Sutherland Sharks, with Sharks coach Ricky Stuart upset over various decisions by referee Paul Simpkins.
- 3 August – Coach Craig Bellamy confirms that the club's rotational captaincy group is over, with Cameron Smith appointed as permanent captain. Bellamy quoted as saying "Obviously, we've had the leadership group for nearly two years, but we just thought going back to the traditional captain was the way to go. We probably would have done it at the start of the year, but I just didn't think Cameron was quite ready for it. There were a couple of areas he needed to get better at...and he's worked on those areas and he's right to go now."
- 8 August – Long-time Melbourne recruitment officer Peter O'Sullivan is poached by Sydney Roosters in a two-year deal worth $150,000 a season.
- Round 22 – A 'grapple tackle' furore erupts after Melbourne's 14–6 win over Brisbane Broncos with Broncos captain Petero Civoniceva and coach Wayne Bennett particularly vocal in complaining.
- Round 24 – Melbourne secure their second successive minor premiership with a dominant second half performance against Canterbury-Bankstown Bulldogs. The 38–6 win came with a hat-trick of tries to Israel Folau, who in doing so equaled the club record for tries for a season.
- Round 25 – Israel Folau scores his 21st try of the season as Melbourne thrash new club Gold Coast Titans 50–6 in the first meeting between the teams. The victory saw Melbourne finish the season with a perfect 12–0 record in games played at Olympic Park.
- Preliminary Final – Returning to Telstra Dome for the first time since 2001, Melbourne progress to their second successive NRL Grand Final with a 26–10 win over Parramatta Eels.
- 30 November – Cameron Smith is awarded the Golden Boot as the best player in the world.

=== Milestone games ===
| Round | Player | Milestone |
|---|---|---|
| Round 1 | Anthony Quinn | Storm debut |
| Round 1 | Israel Folau | NRL debut |
| Round 1 | James Aubusson | NRL debut |
| Round 2 | Ryan Shortland | NRL debut |
| Round 2 | Brett White | 50th game |
| Round 3 | Cameron Smith | 100th game |
| Round 4 | Sam Tagataese | NRL debut |
| Round 5 | Russell Aitken | Storm debut |
| Round 7 | Antonio Kaufusi | 50th game |
| Round 10 | Will Chambers | NRL debut |
| Round 10 | Sika Manu | NRL debut |
| Round 10 | Scott Anderson | NRL debut |
| Round 12 | Garret Crossman | 50th game |
| Round 13 | Clint Newton | Storm debut |
| Round 14 | Matt Geyer | 100th NRL try |
| Round 18 | Steve Turner | 50th game |
| Round 19 | Ryan Hoffman | 100th game |
| Round 19 | Dallas Johnson | 100th game |
| Round 21 | Billy Slater | 100th game |
| Round 21 | Ben Cross | 50th game |
| Round 25 | Greg Inglis | 50th game |

=== Jerseys ===
Continuing with apparel manufacturer Reebok, the designs of Melbourne's home and clash jerseys were unchanged from 2006.

== Fixtures ==
=== Pre Season ===
| Date | Rd | Opponent | Venue | Result | Mel. | Opp. | Tries | Goals | Field goals | Ref |
|---|---|---|---|---|---|---|---|---|---|---|
| 17 February | Trial | Gold Coast Titans | BCU International Stadium, Coffs Harbour | Won | 32 | 6 | W Chambers (2), D Johnson, A Quinn, S Tagataese, B Slater | C Smith (4) | | |
| 24 February | Trial | Manly Warringah Sea Eagles | Quad Park, Sunshine Coast | Lost | 20 | 30 | A Kaufusi, B White, L Samoa, I Donnelly | L Foran, L Samoa | | |
| 3 March | Trial | Brisbane Broncos | MC Labour Park, Melbourne | Won | 46 | 0 | C Cronk (2), R Hoffman, M King, M Geyer, J Lima, B Slater, G Inglis | C Smith (6), J Smith | | |

=== Regular season ===
==== Result by round ====
| Round | 1 | 2 | 3 | 4 | 5 | 6 | 7 | 8 | 9 | 10 | 11 | 12 | 13 | 14 | 15 | 16 | 17 | 18 | 19 | 20 | 21 | 22 | 23 | 24 | 25 |
|---|---|---|---|---|---|---|---|---|---|---|---|---|---|---|---|---|---|---|---|---|---|---|---|---|---|
| Ground | H | A | H | A | A | H | A | A | H | H | A | H | A | A | H | – | A | H | H | A | A | H | H | A | H |
| Result | W | W | W | W | W | W | W | L | W | W | L | W | W | W | W | B | W | W | W | L | W | W | W | W | W |
| Position | 6 | 5 | 4 | 3 | 2 | 2 | 1 | 2 | 2 | 2 | 2 | 1 | 1 | 1 | 1 | 1 | 1 | 1 | 1 | 1 | 1 | 1 | 1 | 1 | 1 |
| Points | 2 | 4 | 6 | 8 | 10 | 12 | 14 | 14 | 16 | 18 | 18 | 20 | 22 | 24 | 26 | 28 | 30 | 32 | 34 | 34 | 36 | 38 | 40 | 42 | 44 |

Source: Rugby League Tables
A = Away; H = Home; N = Neutral; B = Bye; W = Win; D = Draw; L = Loss

==== Matches ====
- (g.p.) - Golden Point extra time
- (pen) - Penalty try

| Date | Rd | Opponent | Venue | Result | Mel. | Opp. | Tries | Goals | Field goals | Ref |
|---|---|---|---|---|---|---|---|---|---|---|
| 16 March | 1 | Wests Tigers | Olympic Park, Melbourne | Won | 18 | 16 | I Folau, R Hoffman, J Smith | C Smith 3/3 | | |
| 24 March | 2 | Canberra Raiders | Canberra Stadium, Canberra | Won | 32 | 16 | I Folau (2), B White (2), M Geyer, B Slater | C Smith 4/6 | | |
| 1 April | 3 | New Zealand Warriors | Olympic Park, Melbourne | Won | 30 | 12 | I Folau (2), B Slater (2), R Hoffman, M King | C Smith 3/6 | | |
| 7 April | 4 | Newcastle Knights | EnergyAustralia Stadium, Newcastle | Won | 22 | 12 | I Folau (2), M King, A Quinn | C Smith 3/4 | | |
| 14 April | 5 | St George Illawarra Dragons | OKI Jubilee Stadium, Sydney | Won | 24 | 10 | S Turner (2), I Folau, M King, A Quinn | C Smith 1/4, S Turner 1/1 | | |
| 21 April | 6 | Penrith Panthers | Olympic Park, Melbourne | Won | 30 | 20 | C Cronk (2), C Smith (2), R Hoffman | C Smith 5/6 | | |
| 27 April | 7 | Brisbane Broncos | Suncorp Stadium, Brisbane | Won | 28 | 18 | B Slater (2), I Folau, R Hoffman, S Turner | C Smith 4/6 | | |
| 5 May | 8 | Wests Tigers | Bluetongue Stadium, Gosford | Lost | 12 | 30 | D Johnson, M King | C Smith 2/2 | | |
| 14 May | 9 | Canterbury-Bankstown Bulldogs | Olympic Park, Melbourne | Won | 38 | 14 | C Cronk (2), M King (2), I Folau, R Hoffman | C Smith 7/7 | | |
| 19 May | 10 | Sydney Roosters | Olympic Park, Melbourne | Won | 26 | 2 | W Chambers, I Folau, R Hoffman, J Lima, B Slater | S Turner 3/5 | | |
| 26 May | 11 | Manly Warringah Sea Eagles | Brookvale Oval, Sydney | Lost | 12 | 13 | I Folau, M King | C Smith 2/2 | | |
| 2 June | 12 | South Sydney Rabbitohs | Olympic Park, Melbourne | Won | 26 | 10 | M Geyer, G Inglis, M King, S Turner | C Smith 5/5 | | |
| 10 June | 13 | New Zealand Warriors | Mount Smart Stadium, Auckland | Won | 4 | 2 | J Smith | S Turner 0/1 | | |
| 16 June | 14 | North Queensland Cowboys | Dairy Farmers Stadium, Townsville | Won | 58 | 12 | G Inglis (2), M King (2), C Cronk, M Geyer, C Newton, J Smith, S Tagataese, S Turner | C Smith 9/10 | | |
| 24 June | 15 | St George Illawarra Dragons | Olympic Park, Melbourne | Won | 28 | 6 | S Turner (2), M Geyer, R Hoffman, M King, C Newton | C Smith 2/7 | | |
| 30 June | 16 | Bye | | | | | | | | |
| 7 July | 17 | South Sydney Rabbitohs | Bluetongue Stadium, Gosford | Won | 12 | 8 | I Folau, M King | C Smith 2/2 | | |
| 16 July | 18 | Newcastle Knights | Olympic Park, Melbourne | Won | 44 | 0 | A Quinn (2), B Slater (2), S Turner (2), R Hoffman, M King, C Newton | C Smith 3/6, S Turner 1/3 | | |
| 21 July | 19 | Canberra Raiders | Olympic Park, Melbourne | Won | 34 | 6 | G Inglis (2), I Folau, M Geyer, M King, S Turner | C Smith 5/6 | | |
| 27 July | 20 | Sydney Roosters | Aussie Stadium, Sydney | Lost | 16 | 26 | J Aubusson, C Cronk, I Folau | C Smith 2/3 | | |
| 6 August | 21 | Cronulla-Sutherland Sharks | Toyota Park, Sydney | Won | 17 | 16 | I Folau, R Hoffman, M King | I Folau 2/3 | C Cronk | |
| 12 August | 22 | Brisbane Broncos | Olympic Park, Melbourne | Won | 14 | 6 | I Folau, M Geyer, G Inglis | C Smith 1/3 | | |
| 17 August | 23 | Parramatta Eels | Olympic Park, Melbourne | Won | 14 | 10 | B Slater, C Smith | C Smith 3/3 | | |
| 24 August | 24 | Canterbury-Bankstown Bulldogs | Telstra Stadium, Sydney | Won | 38 | 6 | I Folau (3), M Geyer, J Lima, B Slater | C Smith 6/6, I Folau 1/1 | | |
| 2 September | 25 | Gold Coast Titans | Olympic Park, Melbourne | Won | 50 | 6 | M Crocker, C Cronk, I Folau, R Hoffman, G Inglis, M King, A Quinn, B Slater, S Turner | C Smith 5/6, I Folau 1/1, M King 1/1 | | |

=== Finals ===
Qualifying final

Sunday, 9 September
16:00 AEST (UTC+10)

| Melbourne Storm | 40 – 0 | Brisbane Broncos |
|---|---|---|
| Tries: 8 Turner 15', 26', 40'; Quinn 5'; C Smith 31'; Geyer 34'; Slater 58'; King 73'; Goals: 4 C Smith (3/7); Folau 59' (1/2) | 1st: 28–0; 2nd: 12–0; Report |

Olympic Park, Melbourne
Attendance: 15,522
Referee: Steve Clark
Player of the Match: Cooper Cronk (Melbourne)

Preliminary final

Sunday, 23 September
16:00 AEST (UTC+10)

| Melbourne Storm | 26 – 10 | Parramatta Eels |
|---|---|---|
| Tries: 4 King 54', 80'; Turner 28'; Cronk 31'; Goals: 5 C Smith 32', pen 53', 55', pen 73', 80' (5/6) | 1st: 10–4; 2nd: 16–6; Report | Tries: 2 Grothe Jr. 11'; Reddy 43'; Goals: 1 Inu 44' (1/2) |

Telstra Dome, Melbourne
Attendance: 33,427
Referee: Tony Archer
Player of the Match: Ryan Hoffman (Melbourne)

2007 NRL Grand Final

Sunday, 30 September
19:15 AEST (UTC+10)

| Melbourne Storm | 34 – 8 | Manly Warringah Sea Eagles |
|---|---|---|
| Tries: 7 Quinn 12', 76'; Inglis 23', 55'; Crocker 44'; King 52'; Newton 72'; Goals: 3 C Smith 13', 74', 76' (3/8) | 1st: 10–4; 2nd: 24–4; Report | Tries: 2 Matai 39'; Hicks 62'; Goals: Orford (0/2) |

ANZStadium, Sydney
Attendance: 81,392
Referee: Tony Archer
Touch judges: Steve Chiddy, Russell Turner
Clive Churchill Medal: Greg Inglis (Melbourne)

== Ladder ==
2007 NRL season
| Pos | Team | Pld | W | D | L | B | PF | PA | PD | Pts |
|---|---|---|---|---|---|---|---|---|---|---|
| 1 | Melbourne Storm | 24 | 21 | 0 | 3 | 1 | 627 | 277 | +350 | 44 |
| 2 | Manly-Warringah Sea Eagles | 24 | 18 | 0 | 6 | 1 | 597 | 377 | +220 | 38 |
| 3 | North Queensland Cowboys | 24 | 15 | 0 | 9 | 1 | 547 | 618 | −71 | 32 |
| 4 | New Zealand Warriors | 24 | 13 | 1 | 10 | 1 | 593 | 434 | +159 | 29 |
| 5 | Parramatta Eels | 24 | 13 | 0 | 11 | 1 | 573 | 481 | +92 | 28 |
| 6 | Canterbury-Bankstown Bulldogs | 24 | 12 | 0 | 12 | 1 | 575 | 528 | +47 | 26 |
| 7 | South Sydney Rabbitohs | 24 | 12 | 0 | 12 | 1 | 408 | 399 | +9 | 26 |
| 8 | Brisbane Broncos | 24 | 11 | 0 | 13 | 1 | 511 | 476 | +35 | 24 |
| 9 | Wests Tigers | 24 | 11 | 0 | 13 | 1 | 541 | 561 | −20 | 24 |
| 10 | Sydney Roosters | 24 | 10 | 1 | 13 | 1 | 445 | 610 | −165 | 23 |
| 11 | Cronulla-Sutherland Sharks | 24 | 10 | 0 | 14 | 1 | 463 | 403 | +60 | 22 |
| 12 | Gold Coast Titans | 24 | 10 | 0 | 14 | 1 | 409 | 559 | −150 | 22 |
| 13 | St George Illawarra Dragons | 24 | 9 | 0 | 15 | 1 | 431 | 509 | −78 | 20 |
| 14 | Canberra Raiders | 24 | 9 | 0 | 15 | 1 | 522 | 652 | −130 | 20 |
| 15 | Newcastle Knights | 24 | 9 | 0 | 15 | 1 | 418 | 708 | −290 | 20 |
| 16 | Penrith Panthers | 24 | 8 | 0 | 16 | 1 | 539 | 607 | −68 | 18 |

== 2007 Coaching staff ==
- Head coach: Craig Bellamy
- Assistant coaches: Michael Maguire & Stephen Kearney
- Development coach: Brad Arthur
- Specialist coach: Matthew Johns
- Strength and conditioning Coach: Alex Corvo
- Football Manager: Dean Lance

== 2007 Squad ==
List current as of 18 October 2021

| Cap (Note: Players are listed with the cap number as they appear on the Melbourne Storm honour board. Additional squad members do not have a cap number.) | Nat. | Player name | Position | First Storm Game | Previous First Grade RL club (Note: This column denotes the previous RL club the player was signed to and played first grade RL for. If they are yet to debut then this is stipulated. If they were merely signed to the club but did not play then it is not counted.) |
|---|---|---|---|---|---|
| 18 | (Australia) | Matt Geyer | WG | 1998 | (Australia) Perth Reds |
| 26 | (New Zealand) | Matt Rua | SR | 1998 | (Australia) Melbourne Storm |
| 55 | (Australia) | Cameron Smith (c) | HK | 2002 | (Australia) Melbourne Storm |
| 58 | (Australia) | Billy Slater | FB | 2003 | (Australia) Melbourne Storm |
| 60 | (Australia) | Dallas Johnson | LK | 2003 | (Australia) Melbourne Storm |
| 62 | (Australia) | Ryan Hoffman | SR, LK | 2003 | (Australia) Melbourne Storm |
| 68 | (Tonga) | Antonio Kaufusi | PR | 2003 | (Australia) Melbourne Storm |
| 69 | (Australia) | Matt King | CE | 2003 | (Australia) Melbourne Storm |
| 72 | (Australia) | Steve Turner | WG | 2004 | (Australia) Penrith Panthers |
| 73 | (Australia) | Cooper Cronk | HB | 2004 | (Australia) Melbourne Storm |
| 74 | (New Zealand) | Jeremy Smith | LK | 2004 | (Australia) Melbourne Storm |
| 76 | (Australia) | Brett White | PR | 2005 | (Australia) Melbourne Storm |
| 77 | (Australia) | Ian Donnelly | PR | 2005 | (Australia) Manly Sea Eagles |
| 79 | (Australia) | Greg Inglis | CE | 2005 | (Australia) Melbourne Storm |
| 83 | (Australia) | Garrett Crossman | PR | 2006 | (Australia) Penrith Panthers |
| 84 | (Australia) | Michael Crocker | SR | 2006 | (Australia) Sydney Roosters |
| 86 | (New Zealand) | Adam Blair | PR | 2006 | (Australia) Melbourne Storm |
| 88 | (Australia) | Ben Cross | PR | 2006 | (Australia) Melbourne Storm |
| 89 | (Australia) | Matthew Bartlett | SR | 2006 | (Australia) Melbourne Storm |
| 90 | (New Zealand) | Jeff Lima | PR | 2006 | (Australia) Wests Tigers |
| 91 | (Australia) | Anthony Quinn | WG | 2007 | (Australia) Newcastle Knights |
| 92 | (Australia) | Israel Folau | WG | 2007 | (Australia) Melbourne Storm |
| 93 | (Australia) | James Aubusson | HK | 2007 | (Australia) Melbourne Storm |
| 94 | (New Zealand) | Ryan Shortland | CE | 2007 | (Australia) Melbourne Storm |
| 95 | (Samoa) | Sam Tagataese | PR | 2007 | (Australia) Melbourne Storm |
| 96 | (Australia) | Russell Aitken | HK | 2007 | (Australia) Cronulla Sharks |
| 97 | (Australia) | Will Chambers | CE | 2007 | (Australia) Melbourne Storm |
| 98 | (New Zealand) | Sika Manu | SR | 2007 | (Australia) Melbourne Storm |
| 99 | (Australia) | Scott Anderson | PR | 2007 | (Australia) Melbourne Storm |
| 100 | (United States) | Clint Newton | SR | 2007 | (Australia) Newcastle Knights |
| - | (Australia) | Aiden Tolman | PR | Yet to Debut | (Australia) Melbourne Storm |
| - | (New Zealand) | Liam Foran | HB | Yet to Debut | (Australia) Melbourne Storm |
| - | (Australia) | Danny Vaughan | PR | Yet to Debut | (Australia) Melbourne Storm |
| | (New Zealand) | Paletasala Ale | SR | Yet to Debut | (Australia) Melbourne Storm |

== 2007 Grand Final Winning Team ==
Melbourne Storm
| 2007 Grand Final Winning Team | Interchange | Coach |
|---|---|---|
| 1 Billy Slater – FB; 2 Steve Turner – WG; 3 Matt King – CE; 4 Israel Folau – CE; 5 Anthony Quinn – WG; 6 Greg Inglis – FE; 7 Cooper Cronk – HB; 8 Ben Cross – PR; 9 Cameron Smith (c) – HK; 10 Brett White – PR; 11 Clint Newton – SR; 12 Ryan Hoffman – SR; 13 Dallas Johnson – LK | 14 Matt Geyer; 15 Jeremy Smith; 16 Michael Crocker; 17 Jeff Lima | Head coach: Craig Bellamy; Legend: (c) Captain(s); (vc) Vice-captain(s) |

== Team of the decade ==
As part of their 10-year celebrations in 2007, Melbourne Storm released a team of the decade. The 17-man team was selected by former assistant coach Greg Brentnall, foundation CEO John Ribot, and then board member Frank Stanton (all 3 were members of the 1982 Kangaroo tour "Invincibles", Brentnall and Ribot as players with Stanton the coach). The trio were joined by The Daily Telegraph (Sydney) journalist Steve Mascord.

Melbourne Storm
| Team of the Decade | Interchange | Coach |
|---|---|---|
| 1 Billy Slater – FB; 2 Matt Geyer – WG; 3 Matt King – CE; 4 Greg Inglis – CE; 5 Marcus Bai – WG; 6 Scott Hill – FE; 7 Brett Kimmorley – HB; 8 Glenn Lazarus (c) – PR; 9 Cameron Smith – HK; 10 Robbie Kearns – PR; 11 Dallas Johnson – SR; 12 Stephen Kearney – SR; 13 Tawera Nikau – LK | 14 Cooper Cronk; 15 Rodney Howe; 16 Ryan Hoffman; 17 David Kidwell | Head coach: Craig Bellamy; Legend: (c) Captain(s); (vc) Vice-captain(s); Updated: 9 August 2014; Source(s): Team of the Decade |

== Player movements ==
Losses

- Matthew Bartlett to North Queensland Cowboys (midseason) (Note: Bartlett was released on 1 June 2007 to join the Cowboys.)
- Ian Donnelly to Gold Coast Titans (midseason) (Note: Donnelly was released on 6 June 2007 to join the Titans.)
- Jamie Feeney to Retirement
- Nathan Friend to Gold Coast Titans
- Scott Hill to Harlequins RL
- Daniel Isaac to Gold Coast Titans
- David Kidwell to South Sydney Rabbitohs
- Smith Samau to Gold Coast Titans
- Glen Turner to Canberra Raiders
- Chris Walker to Gold Coast Titans
- Jake Webster to Gold Coast Titans

Gains

- Clint Newton from Newcastle Knights (midseason)
- Anthony Quinn from Newcastle Knights

== Representative honours ==
This table lists all players who have played a representative match in 2007.

| Player | 2007 ANZAC Test | City vs Country Origin | State of Origin 1 | State of Origin 2 | State of Origin 3 | 2007 All Golds Tour |
|---|---|---|---|---|---|---|
| Michael Crocker | – | – | – | – | – | Australia |
| Cooper Cronk | – | – | – | – | – | Australia |
| Ben Cross | – | Country | – | – | – | – |
| Israel Folau | – | – | – | – | – | Australia |
| Ryan Hoffman | – | City | – | New South Wales | New South Wales | Australia |
| Greg Inglis | – | – | Queensland | Queensland | Queensland | Australia |
| Dallas Johnson | – | – | Queensland | Queensland | Queensland | Australia |
| Antonio Kaufusi | – | – | Queensland | – | – | – |
| Matt King | Australia | – | New South Wales | New South Wales | New South Wales | – |
| Jeff Lima | – | – | – | – | – | New Zealand |
| Anthony Quinn | – | Country | – | – | – | – |
| Cameron Smith | Australia | – | Queensland | Queensland | Queensland | Australia (c) |
| Jeremy Smith | – | – | – | – | – | New Zealand |
| Brett White | – | Country | – | New South Wales | – | – |

== Statistics ==
This table contains playing statistics for all Melbourne Storm players to have played in the 2007 NRL season.

- Statistics sources:

| Name | Appearances | Tries | Goals | Field goals | Points |
|---|---|---|---|---|---|
| Russell Aitken | 1 | 0 | 0 | 0 | 0 |
| Scott Anderson | 2 | 0 | 0 | 0 | 0 |
| James Aubusson | 16 | 1 | 0 | 0 | 4 |
| Matthew Bartlett | 2 | 0 | 0 | 0 | 0 |
| Adam Blair | 8 | 0 | 0 | 0 | 0 |
| Will Chambers | 5 | 1 | 0 | 0 | 4 |
| Michael Crocker | 10 | 2 | 0 | 0 | 8 |
| Cooper Cronk | 25 | 8 | 0 | 1 | 33 |
| Ben Cross | 23 | 0 | 0 | 0 | 0 |
| Garret Crossman | 14 | 0 | 0 | 0 | 0 |
| Ian Donnelly | 5 | 0 | 0 | 0 | 0 |
| Israel Folau | 27 | 21 | 5 | 0 | 94 |
| Matt Geyer | 25 | 8 | 0 | 0 | 32 |
| Ryan Hoffman | 25 | 10 | 0 | 0 | 40 |
| Greg Inglis | 20 | 9 | 0 | 0 | 36 |
| Dallas Johnson | 23 | 1 | 0 | 0 | 4 |
| Antonio Kaufusi | 10 | 0 | 0 | 0 | 0 |
| Matt King | 23 | 20 | 1 | 0 | 82 |
| Jeff Lima | 25 | 2 | 0 | 0 | 8 |
| Sika Manu | 3 | 0 | 0 | 0 | 0 |
| Clint Newton | 15 | 4 | 0 | 0 | 16 |
| Anthony Quinn | 26 | 8 | 0 | 0 | 32 |
| Matt Rua | 1 | 0 | 0 | 0 | 0 |
| Ryan Shortland | 1 | 0 | 0 | 0 | 0 |
| Billy Slater | 23 | 12 | 0 | 0 | 48 |
| Cameron Smith | 24 | 4 | 88 | 0 | 192 |
| Jeremy Smith | 19 | 3 | 0 | 0 | 12 |
| Sam Tagataese | 12 | 1 | 0 | 0 | 4 |
| Steve Turner | 21 | 15 | 5 | 0 | 70 |
| Brett White | 24 | 2 | 0 | 0 | 8 |
| 30 players used | — | 132 | 99 | 1 | 727 |

=== Scorers ===
Most points in a game: 18 points

- Round 6 – Cameron Smith (2 tries, 5 goals) vs Penrith Panthers
- Round 14 – Cameron Smith (9 goals) vs North Queensland Cowboys

Most tries in a game: 3

- Round 24 – Israel Folau vs Canterbury-Bankstown Bulldogs
- Qualifying Final – Steve Turner vs Brisbane Broncos

=== Winning games ===
Highest score in a winning game: 58 points

- Round 14 vs North Queensland Cowboys

Lowest score in a winning game: 4 points

- Round 13 vs New Zealand Warriors

Greatest winning margin: 46 points

- Round 14 vs North Queensland Cowboys

Greatest number of games won consecutively: 8

- Round 21 – Grand Final

=== Losing games ===
Highest score in a losing game: 16 points

- Round 20 vs Sydney Roosters

Lowest score in a losing game: 12 points

- Round 8 vs Wests Tigers
- Round 11 vs Manly Warringah Sea Eagles

Greatest losing margin: 18 points

- Round 8 vs Wests Tigers

Greatest number of games lost consecutively: 1

== Feeder Team ==
For a tenth and ultimately final season, Melbourne continued their affiliation with Norths Devils, with reserve players travelling to Brisbane each week to play with the Devils in the Queensland Cup.

Coached by former Storm player Kevin Carmichael, the Devils missed the Queensland Cup finals for the second year in a row.

2007 Queensland Cup
| Pos | Team | Pld | W | D | L | B | PF | PA | PD | Pts |
|---|---|---|---|---|---|---|---|---|---|---|
| 8 | Norths Devils | 20 | 8 | 1 | 11 | 2 | 507 | 524 | -17 | 21 |

== Awards and honours ==
=== Trophy Cabinet ===
- 2007 J. J. Giltinan Shield
- 2007 Provan-Summons Trophy
- Michael Moore Trophy

=== Melbourne Storm Awards Night ===
- Melbourne Storm Player of the Year: Cameron Smith
- Members' Player of the Year: Billy Slater
- Best Back: Billy Slater
- Best Forward: Dallas Johnson
- Most Improved: Jeff Lima
- Rookie of the Year: Israel Folau
- Mick Moore Club Person of the Year: Matt King
- Life Member Inductee: Greg Brentnall

=== Dally M Awards Night ===
- Peter Moore Rookie of the Year: Israel Folau
- Dally M Representative Player of the Year: Cameron Smith
- Dally M Coach of the Year: Craig Bellamy
- Dally M Top Try Scorer of the Year: Israel Folau
- Dally M Lock of the Year: Dallas Johnson

=== Rugby League World Golden Boot Awards Night ===
- Golden Boot Award: Cameron Smith

=== RLIF Awards ===
- RLIF International Newcomer of the Year: Israel Folau

=== Additional Awards ===
- Clive Churchill Medal: Greg Inglis
- Wally Lewis Medal: Cameron Smith
- QRL Ron McAuliffe Medal: Cameron Smith
