= Greg Inglis =

Australian international rugby league footballer

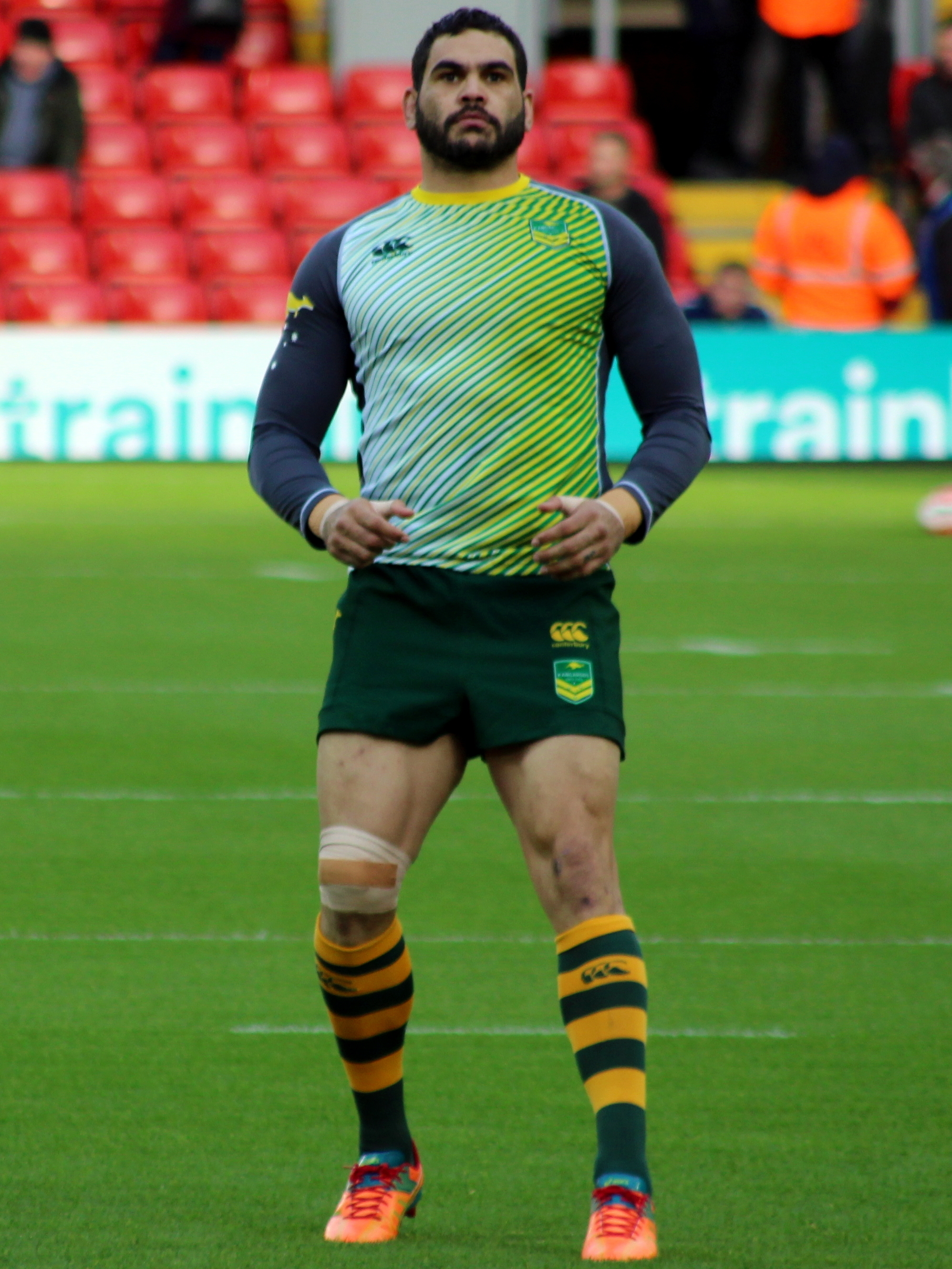

Personal information
- Full name: Gregory Paul Inglis
- Born: 15 January 1987 (age 39) Kempsey, New South Wales, Australia

Playing information
- Height: 195 cm (6 ft 5 in)
- Weight: 105 kg (231 lb; 16 st 7 lb)
- Position: Centre, Fullback, Five-eighth
Club
Years	Team	Pld	T	G	FG	P
2005–10	Melbourne Storm	118	78	24	3	333
2011–19	South Sydney	146	71	0	1	289
2021	Warrington Wolves	3	2	0	0	8
	Total	267	151	24	4	630
Representative
Years	Team	Pld	T	G	FG	P
2006–18	Queensland	32	18	0	0	72
2006–16	Australia	39	31	0	0	124
2012–17	Indigenous All Stars	4	2	0	0	8
2016	Prime Minister's XIII	1	2	0	0	8

Gregory Paul Inglis (born 15 January 1987), also known by the nickname of "G.I.", is a retired Indigenous Australian professional rugby league footballer, who regularly played as a centre, fullback, five-eighth and wing.

From 2011 to 2019, Inglis played in the NRL for the South Sydney Rabbitohs, including their 2014 premiership win. A Queensland State of Origin and Australian international representative outside back, he previously played for the Melbourne Storm, with whom he won a Clive Churchill Medal and the Golden Boot Award. Inglis was a versatile back, having played in several positions during his career. He originally played wing or centre for the Storm, occasionally filling in at fullback when injuries or players demanded.

In 2007, he moved to and played at five-eighth until early 2009 before he switched to centre when Brett Finch arrived at the club, where he played for the remainder of his time there until the end of 2010.

Inglis' representative matches for Queensland and Australia have been mainly as a centre, fullback or winger. In November 2009, Inglis won the Golden Boot Award as the world's best player – presented to him by Rugby League World magazine, becoming the third consecutive Storm player to win it, after Cameron Smith (2007) and Billy Slater (2008). In 2018, Inglis was given the captaincy of the Queensland Maroons for the series against the New South Wales Blues (2018). At the end of the 2019 season, he announced his retirement, but in May 2020 signed with the Warrington Wolves for the 2021 English Super League season. After three matches, a hamstring injury ended his tenure with that club.

== Early years ==
Inglis was born in Kempsey, New South Wales, Australia to a family of Indigenous Australian (Dunghutti) heritage. He began playing rugby league at a very young age for the Bowraville Tigers in New South Wales. While living in Macksville, he grew up with fellow local, close friend and future Australian cricket player Phil Hughes.

At 15 years old, after being seen playing at a junior carnival on the NSW North Coast, Inglis signed his first professional contract with the Canberra Raiders but actually played his first senior game at 16 for Hunter Sports High School in New South Wales. Later that year he moved to Brisbane, Queensland and continued to play senior football for Wavell State High School and Melbourne Storm's feeder club Norths Devils. While in Year 11 at Brisbane's Wavell State High School, Inglis played for the 2004 Australian Schoolboys and was already attracting media attention as an NRL star of the future. He played his first under 18s game for the Brisbane Wombats in 2004. Before the end of the 2004 season the Storm had added Inglis to their full-time playing roster for the following year.

== Professional playing career ==
=== 2005 ===
Inglis played for Melbourne in 2005 in a pre-season trial match against the Brisbane Broncos, scoring a try in the Storm's win. While playing for Brisbane's Norths Devils in the 2005 Queensland Cup season, Inglis scored 12 tries in five games and had already become the subject of a battle between Queensland and New South Wales over which state he would play State of Origin for. Inglis scored 194 points for the Norths Devils in the Queensland Cup. In Round 6 of the 2005 NRL season, Inglis made his NRL premiership debut at 18 as a replacement to injured winger Jake Webster in Melbourne's match against the Parramatta Eels, scoring a try in the 26–14 loss at Olympic Park. Inglis would go on to play a month later at fullback in Round 10 against the South Sydney Rabbitohs, scoring a try in the Storm's 38–12 win at Sydney Football Stadium. Inglis played at fullback when Billy Slater was on Origin duty, or at wing or the bench as he slowly solidified himself in the Storm side. At the 2005 Dally M Awards Inglis was nominated for the Rookie of the Year, but lost to Parramatta's Tim Smith. The Storm went on to reach the finals that season and in a play-off match against the Brisbane Broncos, Inglis had his first experience in finals football. With the game still in the balance, Billy Slater was helped from the field with an ankle injury and Inglis replaced him. After being on the field for five minutes, he crossed the Broncos' line untouched to score the match-winning try. The Storm then lost in the Semi-Finals to the North Queensland Cowboys 16–24, ending their season.

=== 2006 ===
Season 2006 saw Inglis continue to play primarily in the fullback role as his counterpart Billy Slater was suspended after he began the season at centre. Inglis was chosen as goalkicker for the Storm after the departure of Matt Orford, but the role was given to Cameron Smith after Inglis kicked just 1 from 5 against the New Zealand Warriors in the Storms' 22–16 win at Mt Smart Stadium in Round 1. After scoring 9 tries in 9 games, Inglis was selected in the starting line up in the Queensland State of Origin team. Inglis' selection for the Queensland Rugby League State of Origin series team in 2006 created controversy which lingers nearly a decade later. Inglis was born and raised in Bowraville, New South Wales, and played his first senior football in New South Wales (in the Arrive Alive Cup). Hunter Sports High coach Steve Dunn exposed the fact that Inglis playing for the school in the Arrive Alive Cup made him eligible for NSW while Queensland Rugby League claim that either Wavell State High School or Brisbane Norths was Inglis' first senior football. Leading rugby league statistician David Middleton provided information that Inglis should be playing for NSW. The matter was resolved when the ARL gave Inglis the green light to play for Queensland Rugby League, because it allowed the QRL's submission that his first senior football was at Wavell High. However, later investigations revealed that Inglis played his first senior game for Newcastle's Hunter Sports High School at the age of 16, and is therefore technically not eligible to play for Queensland. However, Inglis went on to begin his State of Origin career with the Maroons, lining up alongside Storm teammates Cameron Smith and Dallas Johnson. A few early errors were soon forgotten when Inglis scored two tries and saved one. This was not enough for Queensland to win the match as they lost 17–16. In the game after his brilliant Origin debut, Inglis suffered a back injury in Round 13 against the Sydney Roosters in the Storms' 20–16 win at Olympic Park. This injury kept him out for two months, effectively making him miss the rest of the 2006 State of Origin series. It was around this time that Inglis signed for the Storm for a further four seasons, keeping him at the club until 2010. The deal was worth about $2 million, making him the richest teenager in rugby league. On his return from injury, Inglis continued in the centre position and was an important factor in the Storm winning the 2006 NRL season's Minor Premiership. The Storm cruised through the finals, beating the Parramatta Eels 12–6, and the St. George Illawarra Dragons 24–10, then eventually met the Brisbane Broncos in the 2006 NRL Grand Final, which the Storm lost 15–8. Inglis finished the 2006 NRL season with 18 tries and 2 goals, an effort which earned him selection in the Australian team for the 2006 Tri-Nations series. Inglis scored four tries in his opening three tests against New Zealand and Great Britain and featured in the Final against New Zealand, which the Kangaroos won 16–12 at SFS.

=== 2007 ===
In 2007, Inglis was switched primarily to five-eighth; his form at five-eighth was often criticised. In the opening month of the 2007 NRL Season, Inglis failed to score a try. In Round 4, Inglis sustained a knee injury against the Newcastle Knights in the 22–12 win at Hunter Stadium which kept him out of the 2007 Anzac Test. Despite not scoring at five-eighth, Inglis was selected for the Queensland State of Origin team for the 2007 State of Origin series, playing on the wing. In Game 1, Inglis scored 2 tries in Queensland's 25–18 come-from-behind victory, giving him a record of four tries from two matches. Inglis finally scored his first try of 2007 in Round 12, against the South Sydney Rabbitohs in the 26–10 win at Olympic Park. Inglis was again selected to play on the wing for his state, and scored in Queensland's 10–6 win, which gave Queensland their second consecutive Origin series victory. Despite scoring 3 tries in 2 games on the wing for Queensland, Storm coach Craig Bellamy kept pursuing Inglis as a five-eighth. In Game 3 of the Origin series, Inglis injured a ligament in his knee after just 22 minutes, and as a result missed 2 weeks of action. Queensland ultimately lost the game, 18–4, but had already wrapped up the series. Following his return, Inglis and the Storm focused on the finals. The Storm suffered their third loss of 2007 in Round 20 against a Brad Fittler coached Sydney Roosters side 26–16 loss at SFS. Following this, the Storm remained undefeated for the rest of the season, winning their second consecutive Minor Premiership. In the finals, the Storm got redemption from the heartbreaking 2006 loss after beating the Brisbane Broncos 40–0 in the Qualifying Final, eliminating them from the competition for 2007. They then defeated the Parramatta Eels 26–10 in the preliminary final to qualify for the 2007 NRL Grand Final, where the Storm faced off against the Manly-Warringah Sea Eagles, who finished second. After a 10–4 lead at halftime and an untimely injury to Brett Stewart, the Storm blew Manly off the park, winning 34–8. Inglis scored two tries and as a result was awarded the Clive Churchill Medal. Inglis also played in the one-off test at the end of the year. Inglis scored a hat-trick in Australia's record breaking 58–0 thrashing of New Zealand at Westpac Stadium. Later that year, Inglis was selected as a centre in the Storm's "team of the decade" to celebrate their ten-year anniversary.

=== 2008 ===
Inglis had shoulder surgery in the 2007–2008 off-season, and consequently missed the opening 2 rounds of the 2008 NRL Season. Inglis returned in the Round 3 clash with the Sydney Roosters, which the Storm lost 10–6 at SFS, giving them their first consecutive losses since Round 3 and 4 of the 2006 NRL Season (they lost to the Cronulla Sharks the previous week). Inglis was selected on the wing in the Australian team for the historical Centenary Test against New Zealand. Inglis provided a memorable moment, by amazingly hitting the ball into the field of play to provide Mark Gasnier with a try. Australia won 28–12. Inglis was selected to play for Queensland for the 2008 State of Origin series in the centres. Inglis was in Queensland's 18–10 Game 1 loss to New South Wales at ANZ Stadium. In Game 2, Inglis had a brilliant performance, setting up two tries for Darius Boyd as Queensland won 30–0. Around this time, Sonny Bill Williams walked out of the Bulldogs and joined French rugby union side RC Toulonnais, despite being contracted with the Bulldogs until 2012. This move was believed to be instigated by Khoder Nassar, who is also the manager of former 3-time World Champion boxer Anthony Mundine, who walked out of the St. George Illawarra Dragons in 2000. Inglis, who is family friends with both Mundine and Nassar, was rumoured to be on the verge of walking out of the Storm and joining Super Rugby side the Western Force, despite being contracted until 2010. However, Inglis stayed loyal to the Storm and extended his contract until 2012. In Game 3 of the Origin series, Queensland won 16–10, getting their third consecutive series win. Despite having a solid series, Inglis failed to score during the Origin campaign. In the final 7 games of season, Inglis scored 11 tries as the Storm won their third consecutive Minor Premiership.

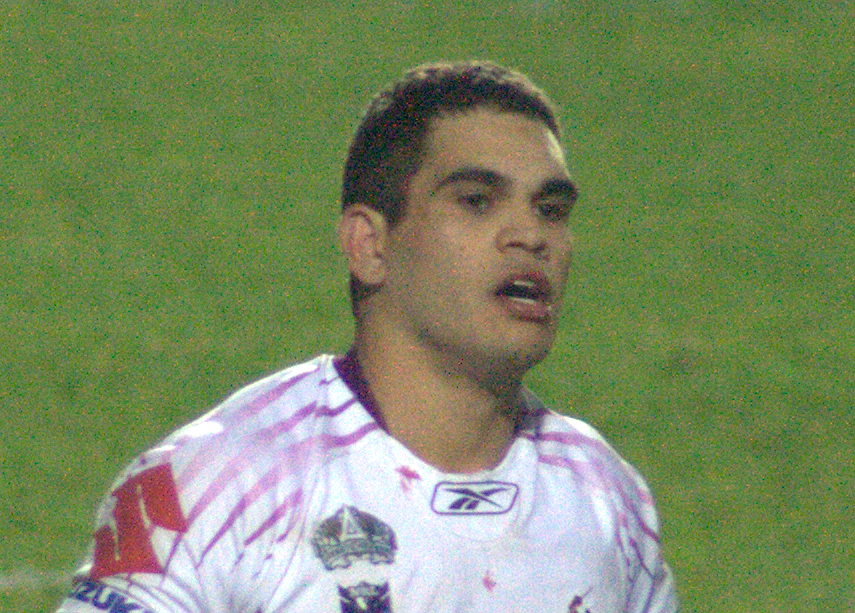
Inglis playing for the Melbourne Storm in 2008

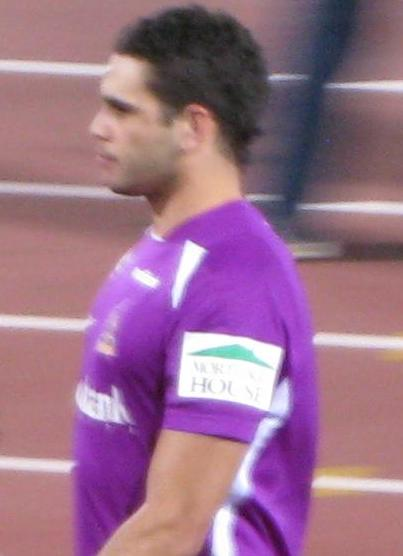
Inglis leaving the field following the Storm's pre-match warm-up at the graveyard in 2008

In August 2008, Inglis was named in the preliminary 46-man Kangaroos squad for the 2008 World Cup. At the 2008 Dally M Awards, Inglis was named Five-eighth of the Year and Representative Player of the Year, as well as winning the Headline Moment of the Year for his brilliant assist to Mark Gasnier in the 2008 Centenary Test. In the finals, the Storm lost 15–18 to the 8th place New Zealand Warriors, becoming the first 1st placed team to lose an 8th place team. In the Semi-Finals, the Storm faced the Brisbane Broncos. In a brilliant match, Inglis scored with 56 seconds remaining to give the Storm a 16–14 victory. The Storm easily beat the Cronulla Sharks, 28–0, to qualify to another Grand Final. However, they lost in a record breaking 40–0 clash with the Manly-Warringah Sea Eagles, failing to retain their Premiership. Inglis played in 22 matches, scored 17 tries and kicked 1 field goal for the Storm in the 2008 NRL season. Inglis was confirmed in the final 24-man Australia squad to compete in the World Cup at the end of the 2008 season. Inglis scored in Australia's 30–6 win over New Zealand, and a hat-trick in their 52–4 win over England. Inglis also scored in the Semi-Final win over Fiji, before Australia surprisingly lost the Final, 34–20, against New Zealand. Inglis scored 6 tries in 4 games for the tournament, and scored in every match he played for the tournament.

=== 2009 ===
At the start of the 2009 season Inglis attracted a lot of attention due to how much weight he'd gained since the previous season, having bulked from 99 kg up to 110 kg, making him one of the biggest players in the game. Inglis scored the first try of the season for 2009 against St George Illawarra as well as being one of the best on ground. Inglis scored the match winning field goal to win the game for the Storm, 17–16 at Olympic Park. In doing so, he had not only ruined Wayne Bennett's last game in charge of the Brisbane Broncos but also his first game coaching the St George Illawarra Dragons, by scoring the match winning point. The Storm had a shaky start to the season, going by a win–loss pattern until Round 7, which they drew 14–14 with the New Zealand Warriors at Olympic Park. In Round 8 the Storm extracted grand final revenge on Premiers the Manly-Warringah Sea Eagles, with Inglis scoring the 22–8 win at Brookvale Oval. During this time, Storm coach Craig Bellamy experimented by putting Cameron Smith at five-eighth, Inglis back in the centres and Ryan Hinchcliffe at hooker. However, after Brett Finch was released by the Parramatta Eels, the Storm signed him and made him their first choice five-eighth, putting Inglis back at his preferred centres position. Inglis was selected for Australia in the 2009 Anzac Test match against New Zealand on 8 May 2009. Inglis was part of an all-Queensland backline, including Billy Slater, Darius Boyd, Justin Hodges, Israel Folau, Darren Lockyer and Johnathan Thurston. This feat had not been achieved since 1924. Australia won 38–10, with the backline scoring all the points. In April 2009, Inglis was named in the preliminary 25-man squad to represent Queensland in the opening State of Origin match for 2009.

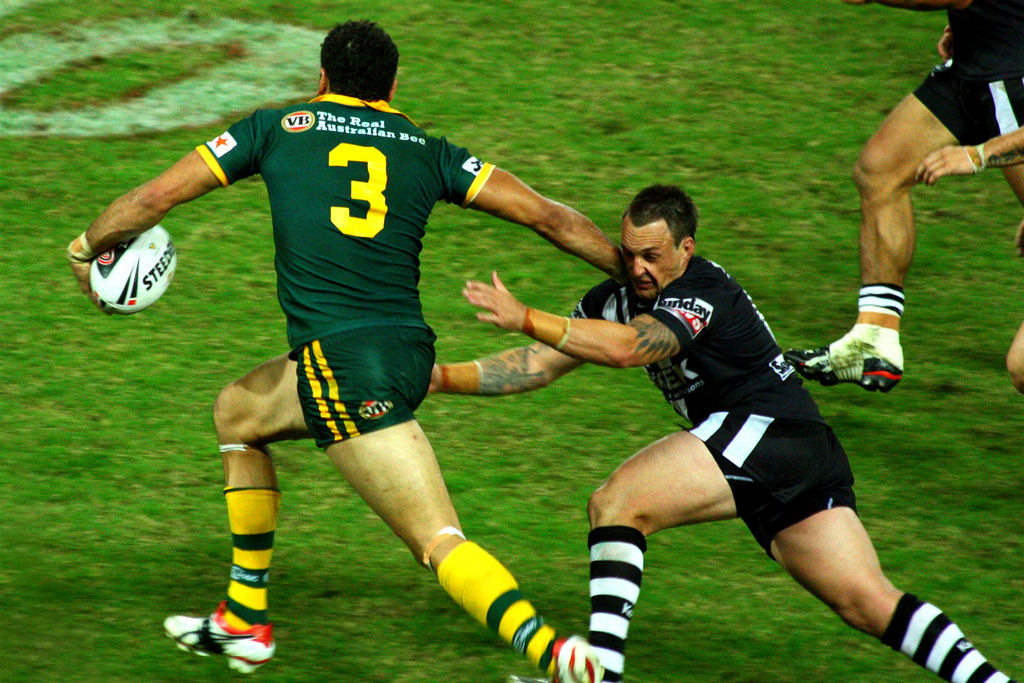
Inglis in action for the Kangaroos against the Kiwis in 2009

He was subsequently picked at centre for the opening State of Origin match. In Game 1, Inglis scored 2 tries, as Queensland won 28–18. Meanwhile, the Storm maintained their position in the Top 4 of the NRL competition.

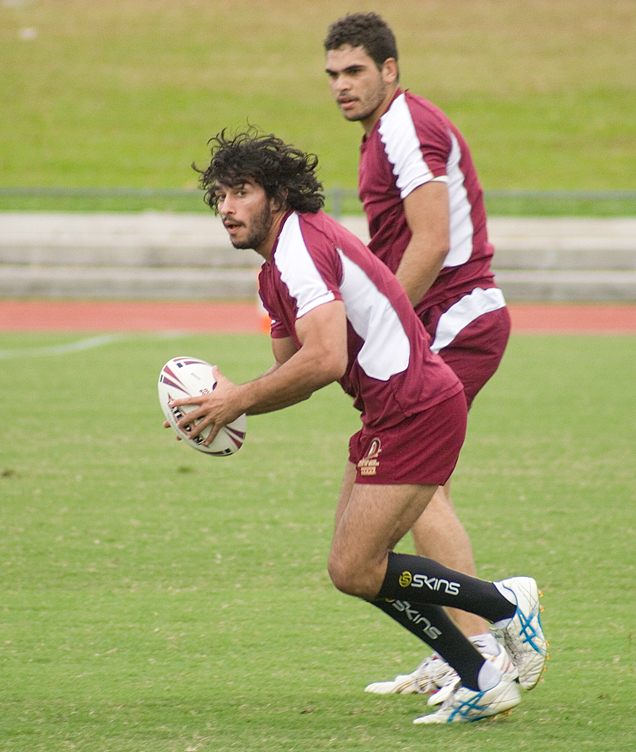
Inglis training with Johnathan Thurston for the Queensland State of Origin team in 2009

In Game 2, Inglis scored again as Queensland recorded a 24–14 win over New South Wales, becoming the first team to win 4 consecutive Origin series. In Game II, Inglis was taken off the field in the first half after receiving a punch to the face from Trent Barrett. In Game 3, New South Wales won 28–16, in a game that featured a memorable brawl in the 79th minute. Inglis received the Wally Lewis Medal for player of the series that year in recognition of his efforts during the 2009 State of Origin series. After Karmichael Hunt shockingly signed with the new AFL club the Gold Coast, Inglis revealed he wouldn't mind "having a crack" at AFL. This created concern that Inglis may make a switch, but Inglis made it clear on the Footy Show that he will fulfill his contract with the Melbourne Storm. On 10 August 2009, Inglis was charged with recklessly causing injury and the unlawful assault of his girlfriend Sally Robinson the previous day, and was indefinitely suspended from playing with the Melbourne Storm. Inglis was cleared to return to play with the Melbourne Storm by the club's board and the NRL on 27 August. Inglis pleaded not guilty to the charges, with the case adjourned for a contest hearing on 12 April 2010. After his court hearing was postponed, Inglis made his comeback against the Sydney Roosters, scoring a double in the Storm's final game 38–4 win at Olympic Park. At the 2009 Dally M Awards Inglis was named centre of the year and representative player of the year. In the finals, the Storm comfortably defeated premiers the Manly-Warringah Sea Eagles 40–12, before defeating the Brisbane Broncos 40–10, in which Inglis scored a hat-trick. The Storm qualified for their fourth consecutive grand final, against the Parramatta Eels. In the 2009 NRL Grand Final against the Parramatta Eels, Inglis scored a try from a Cooper Cronk bomb and kicked a final field goal in the Storm's 23–16 win. From this victory, Inglis become a dual-premiership player as the Storm capped off their dominance by winning their second premiership in three years. Post season he travelled with the Kangaroos to Europe to play in the 2009 Four Nations tournament. Inglis also scored in the 46–16 final win over England and was named player of the series in the Four nations final. Inglis also claimed the Golden Boot Award for the best rugby league player in the world.

In November 2009, American boxer Roy Jones Jr. struck up a friendship with Inglis and dubbed him the Peyton Manning of Australia in terms of athletic ability. Jones later suggested he would be a smash in American football. In December 2009 Inglis won his state's major sporting award by being named "Sport Star of the Year" at the Queensland Sports Awards, becoming the first footballer of any code to win it.

=== 2010 ===
Although selected for the Indigenous All Stars side to face the NRL All Stars in the inaugural All Stars match on 13 February, Inglis was ruled out due to a hip injury. Inglis recovered in time to play for the Storm in their victory over the Super League champions Leeds Rhinos in the 2010 World Club Challenge which the Storm won, 18–10. In Round 4 against the Penrith Panthers, Inglis played his 100th NRL match in the Storms' 16–10 win at Penrith Stadium. For the 2010 Anzac Test, Inglis was selected to play for Australia at centre in their 12–8 victory against New Zealand at AAMI Park. The assault allegation affair ended in April 2010 when Inglis avoided a conviction, accepting a diversion order. In April 2010, it was revealed that the Storm had been breaching the salary cap since 2005, and were subsequently stripped of their NRL Premiership victories in 2007 and 2009. They were also stripped of their 2006, 2007 and 2008 Minor Premiership trophies. Finally, they were stripped of their accumulated premiership points that season and were barred from obtaining any competition points from the 2010 NRL Season, meaning they would inevitably get the wooden spoon, the first in the club's history. Inglis was still allowed to continue to be recognised as the Clive Churchill Medallist from the 2007 grand final. In May 2010, Inglis was invited to trial with National Football League teams Buffalo and Denver.

In Round 10, Inglis scored a personal best 16 points, with 3 tries and 2 goals against the Canberra Raiders in the Storms' 17–6 win at Canberra Stadium. In doing so, he brought his career try tally to 72 tries, overtaking Marcus Bai to become the 3rd highest tryscorer for the Melbourne Storm, behind retired legend Matt Geyer and teammate Billy Slater. In Game 1 of the 2010 State of Origin series, Inglis scored a try in Queensland's 28–24 win as they look to achieve a 5th straight series win. On 11 June 2010, Timana Tahu walked out of the New South Wales Origin camp, which was cited as "personal reasons". On 12 June, however, it was revealed that Tahu walked because of racial comments made by New South Wales Assistant Coach Andrew Johns. It was later revealed the comments were directed at Inglis, as Johns was talking about him with NSW debutant Beau Scott, who faced off with Inglis in Game 2. On 13 June, Tahu revealed that Inglis was not the only target of the racial comments. On 24 June, Inglis said that Johns should be banned from any further involvement in the game of rugby league. In July 2010, Inglis reportedly accepted an apology from Johns. This triggered Inglis to have a big Game 2, scoring the opening try and engaging in a brawl with debutant Beau Scott. This 34–6 victory to Queensland gave them their record fifth straight series win. Queensland achieved their first series whitewash since 1995, and the first of Origin since 2000, to cap off their fifth consecutive series win, winning a thrilling 23–18 encounter. In the wake of the salary cap problems at the Storm, Inglis' future at the club after 2010 became uncertain. Many clubs from four football codes (rugby league, rugby union, American football and Australian rules) pursued him. Clubs included the Brisbane Broncos, Gold Coast Titans, South Sydney Rabbitohs, Catalans Dragons, Essendon Football Club and New York Jets. On 10 August 2010, Inglis signed with the Brisbane Broncos for the 2011 and 2012 NRL seasons in a deal worth $1.2 million. The Broncos had released a key player in Israel Folau who joined AFL club, the Greater Western Sydney Giants, which freed up the funds necessary to secure Inglis' services. Inglis' girlfriend Sally Robinson was living and working in Brisbane, a factor which is said to have helped Inglis make his decision to sign with the Broncos. In August 2010, after the Storm agreed to release Inglis after the 2010 NRL Season, Inglis announced he will join the Brisbane Broncos. On 1 September 2010, the Broncos ordered Inglis to have a shoulder reconstruction in the 2010–2011 off-season. This caused Inglis to miss the end of year Four Nations. In his final game for the Storm in Round 26, against the Newcastle Knights, Inglis scored 2 tries as the Storm won 34–4 at AAMI Park. The win sent off several players who were leaving the club at the end of 2010 due to the salary cap drama. Inglis had also finished the 2010 NRL season as the Storm's top try-scorer with 11 and kicked 7 goals (58) in 20 matches in his last year with the club. By October 2010, no contract with the Broncos had been signed, due to the Storm refusing to release Inglis. On 24 October 2010, the Storm revealed that Inglis owed the club $113,000 worth of legal fees following his 2009 assault charge. A week later, the South Sydney Rabbitohs made an offer to Inglis. Inglis missed the Broncos first training session of the 2010–2011 pre-season on 1 November, citing bad weather in Sydney, where he was staying, as the reason. On 2 November, Inglis assured Broncos CEO Bruno Cullen that he will play for the Broncos in 2011. Two days later, future Broncos teammate Justin Hodges criticised the treatment of Inglis, saying Inglis was considering walking out of rugby league. On 5 November, the Broncos gave Inglis a 24-hour deadline to sign with the club. On 6 November, after Inglis failed to reach Brisbane, the Broncos pulled out of signing Inglis, leaving him without a club for 2011 and beyond. Inglis also received an offer from French rugby club Toulon, backing up Hodges' claim that Inglis may walk out of rugby league. Inglis's inability to sign with the Broncos has been criticised by Cullen, who claims Inglis "betrayed" the Broncos. On 8 November 2010, it was revealed Inglis would most likely sign with the Rabbitohs. On 12 November, Inglis signed with the South Sydney Rabbitohs for the 2011, 2012 and 2013 NRL seasons. The deal was worth $1.8 million. Influences for Inglis's shock move to Redfern included Rabbitohs owner Russell Crowe, Inglis's close friend Anthony Mundine, Inglis's cousin Beau Champion and billionaire Andrew Forrest. Inglis attended his first training session on 15 November. However, third-party deals totaling $200,000 had to be included within South Sydney's salary cap which placed the Rabbits over the NRL salary cap. The deal was not officially approved by the NRL, the Melbourne Storm or the NRL's auditor, Ian Schubert. By 18 December, no deal had been solidified with the Rabbitohs, putting Inglis's NRL career into doubt. According to reports, Schubert refused to accept the contract signed with the Rabbitohs, leaving Inglis to consider leaving the NRL. Inglis soon met with AFL clubs St. Kilda and Essendon. In December 2010, following contract issues with NRL clubs Brisbane and South Sydney, Inglis met with Essendon coach James Hird over a potential switch to Australian rules football. Inglis later revealed he was hours away from signing with Essendon. On 24 December 2010, it was officially announced that Inglis had signed the contract with the Rabbitohs for three seasons, at the expense of cousin Beau Champion, who signed with Melbourne Storm for the same period of time.

=== 2011 ===
Inglis was named in the Indigenous All-Stars side for the second annual NRL All-Stars game. However, his off-season surgery forced him to miss both the All-Stars game for the second consecutive year, as well as the annual Charity Shield game between Souths and reigning NRL Premiers St. George Illawarra Dragons.

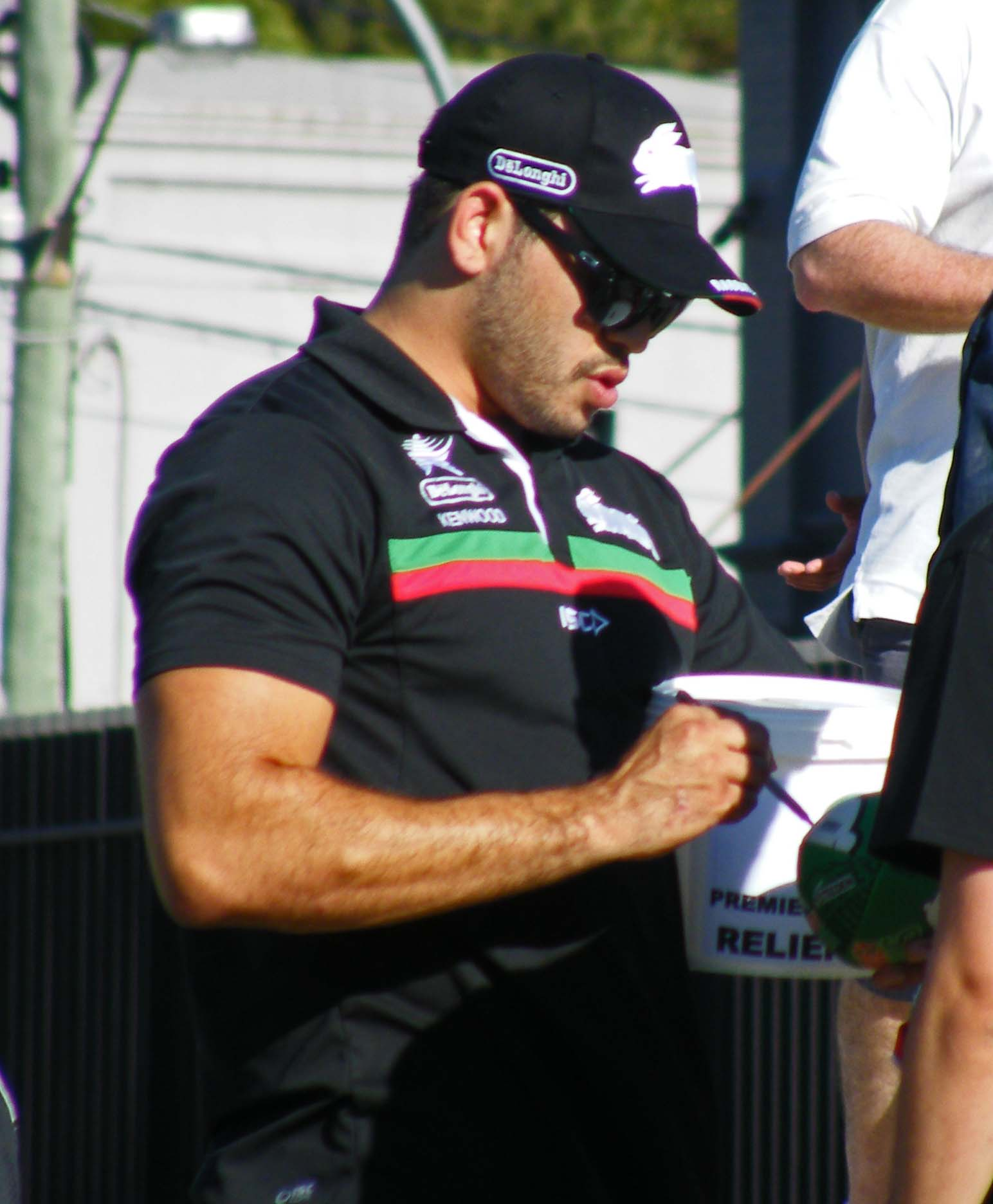
Inglis on club duty for the South Sydney Rabbitohs in 2011

Inglis made his Rabbitohs debut on the opening night of the 2011 NRL season scoring a try in a 29–40 loss to traditional rivals the Sydney Roosters at SFS. When the Rabbitohs struggled in the early stages of the season, registering just 3 victories in the opening 8 weeks. The Rabbitohs announced the signing of former Storm assistant coach Michael Maguire, who Inglis knows very well, as their coach for 2012 and beyond, but the Rabbitohs had to deal with England international Sam Burgess being ruled out for the season, as well as the news of halfback Chris Sandow signing for the Parramatta Eels for 2012. Also, due to the injury of Rabbitohs captain Roy Asotasi, Inglis became front-runner to assume captaincy of the club, but the job was given to Michael Crocker. Inglis was selected for the 2011 Anzac Test against New Zealand, despite his inconsistent form. Inglis was injured in the opening 10 minutes of the game with a hip injury. Australia went on to win 20–10 at Cbus Super Stadium. The injury, however, proved more serious than first thought, and consequently Inglis was ruled out of Game One of the 2011 State of Origin series. In Round 13, Inglis made his return to take on his former club the Melbourne Storm in the Rabbitohs 16–6 loss at ANZ Stadium. Inglis returned to the Maroons side in the 18–8 Game 2 loss to NSW. After some poor form by Inglis in Origin Game 2, Inglis scored the first try in Game 3 in a double in the 34–24 decider victory. The double allowed Inglis to equal the Queensland try-scoring record held by Dale Shearer. Following the Maroons' sixth consecutive series victory, Inglis found form for the Rabbitohs, scoring five tries in his final six games of the season. In Round 25 against the Brisbane Broncos, Inglis suffered an ankle injury against in the 22–10 loss at Suncorp Stadium. In Round 26, With a place in the top eight up for grabs, the Rabbitohs lost to 40–24 to the Newcastle Knights resulting in the Rabbitohs finishing tenth. Inglis played in 18 matches and scored 8 tries in his first year with Rabbitohs in the 2011 NRL season. Inglis's injury continued to haunt him, ruling him out of Darren Lockyer's final Test on home soil. However, Inglis was ruled eligible to play in the upcoming Four Nations. Inglis scored in each of his appearances in the 2011 Four-Nations, including in the 30–8 final win over England at Elland Road.

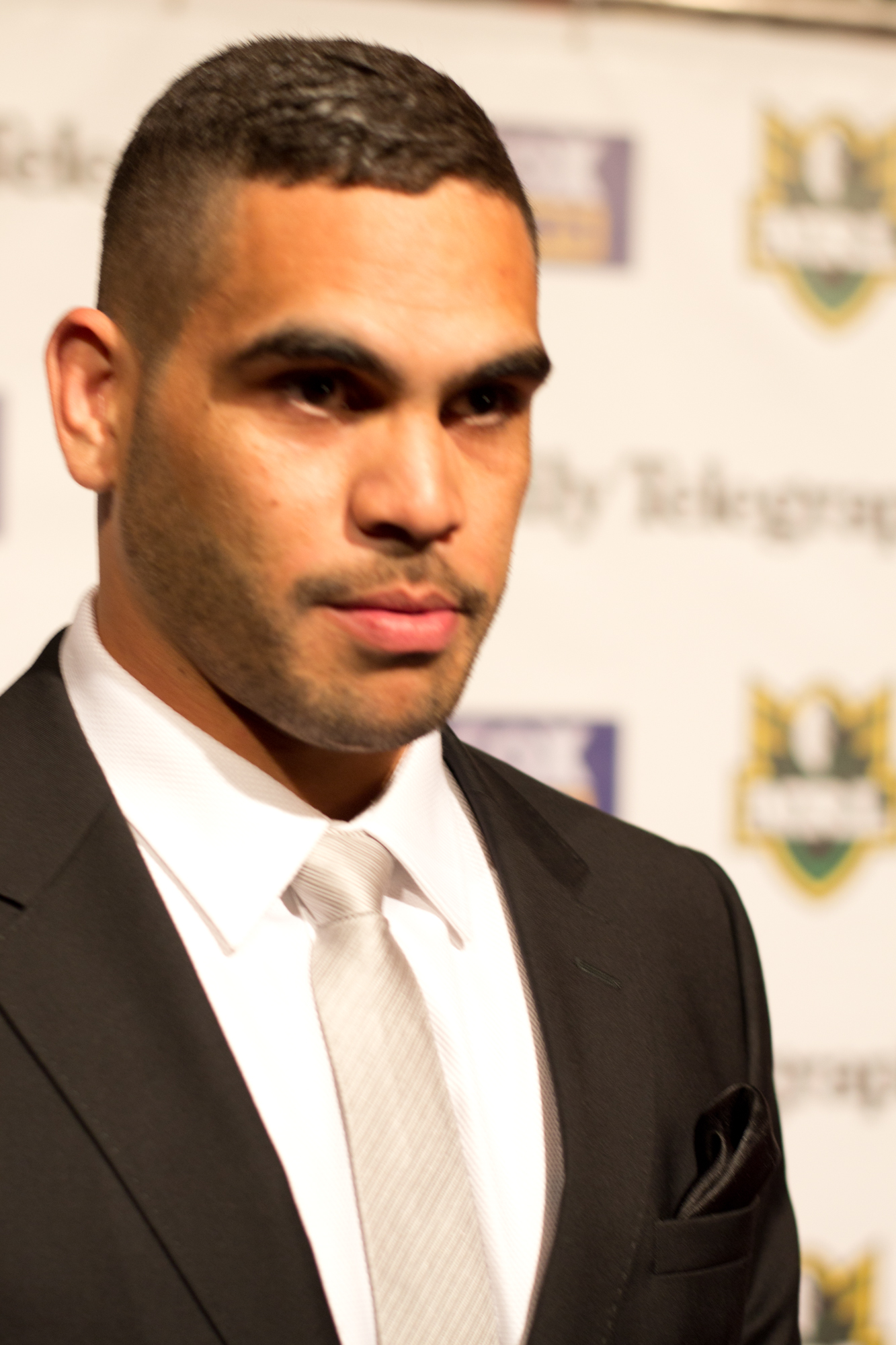
Inglis at the 2012 Dally M Awards

=== 2012 ===
Inglis began the 2012 season with his third selection in the Indigenous All-Stars squad, however, due to injury in 2010 and 2011, it was his first All-Star appearance. Inglis scored a try in a thrilling 36–28 loss to the NRL All Stars and also suffered an ankle injury. Due to lack of quality ball, new Rabbitohs coach and former Melbourne assistant Michael Maguire shifted Inglis from the centres to his original position at fullback in the Round 3 game against the Penrith Panthers. Inglis excelled there, assisting in the Rabbitohs 40–24 win at Penrith Stadium. Following his performance, Inglis became the regular fullback for the Rabbitohs. Inglis's abilities at fullback were demonstrated with him kicking a game-winning field goal against the Wests Tigers in Round 5 in the Rabbitohs 17–16 win at SFS, and a dominant Round 9 three-try performance against the Cronulla-Sutherland Sharks in the Rabbitohs 34–28 win at ANZ Stadium. Inglis represented Australia in the 2012 Anzac Test, scoring a try in the 20–12 win at Eden Park. Inglis played in all State of Origin matches in 2012. In Game 1, Inglis became the greatest try scorer in Origin history by scoring his 13th try for Queensland, albeit a controversial one. Inglis was once again a crucial factor to Queensland winning an incredible seventh series in a row, even playing fullback in Game 3 due to an injury to Billy Slater in the Maroons 21–20 win at Suncorp Stadium. After only one finals appearance since 1989, the Rabbitohs enjoyed a strong season, led by Inglis and the likes of David Taylor, Sam Burgess, Isaac Luke and rookie halfback Adam Reynolds, as well as the coaching of Michael Maguire. They finished 3rd on the ladder, their most successful season since re-joining the NRL in 2002. In their first finals game since 2007, and Inglis's first finals game since 2009, the Rabbitohs clashed with Inglis's former Melbourne Storm club. The Rabbitohs were easily beaten 24–6 by the experienced Storm at AAMI Park. Facing elimination in the semi-finals, they comfortably defeated the Canberra Raiders 38–16 at ANZ Stadium, before losing the preliminary final against the Canterbury-Bankstown Bulldogs 32–8 at ANZ Stadium. Inglis played in 22 matches, scored 12 tries and kicked 1 field goal in an outstanding year for the Rabbitohs in the 2012 NRL season. Inglis played in the October Trans–Tasman test against New Zealand at 1300SMILES Stadium playing at centre in the 18–10 win.

=== 2013 ===
Inglis played for Australia at centre and scored a try in the 2013 Anzac Test 32–12 victory against New Zealand at Canberra Stadium. Inglis played at centre in all three games, and scored a try in Game 2 of the 2013 State of Origin series in the 26–6 win. Queensland won the series, extending their record for consecutive series victories to eight. Inglis also continued his dominance in the fullback role for South Sydney, scoring 14 tries in 20 matches in the 2013 NRL season. At the 2013 Dally M Awards he received the Provan-Summons Medal and was named at fullback in the premiership's team of the year. Along with John Sutton, Inglis was named co-recipient of the 2013 George Piggins Medal as the Rabbitohs' player of the season. In the post-season Inglis played for Australia in their successful 2013 Rugby League World Cup campaign. Inglis won the RLIF International Fullback of the Year and was also shortlisted alongside Sonny Bill Williams and Danny Brough for the RLIF International Player of the Year.

=== 2014 ===
In 2014 Inglis continued playing strongly at club level in the fullback position but was selected for both the 2014 Anzac Test and the 2014 State of Origin series in his old position of centre. In Round 21 against the Newcastle Knights at Barlow Park in Cairns, after Rabbitohs captain John Sutton was ruled out with injury, Inglis was selected to captain the Rabbitohs to make his first match captaining a side, Inglis scored a try and lead the Rabbitohs to an impressive 50–10 win. Towards the end of the 2014 NRL season an injury to Rabbitohs captain John Sutton saw Inglis spend some time in the role. In the Rabbitohs Preliminary Final match against the Sydney Roosters, Inglis played in 200th NRL career match in the 32–22 win, sending the Rabbitohs into the Grand Final. On 5 October 2014, in the Rabbitohs 2014 NRL Grand Final against the Canterbury-Bankstown Bulldogs, Inglis played at fullback and scored the final try off the match, doing his trademark Goanna walk try celebration in the Rabbitohs 30–6 victory. The victory saw him win his first valid premiership ring after those that he won with the Melbourne Storm in 2007 and 2009 were stripped due to salary cap breaches, which forced him to leave that club at the end of 2010. Inglis finished off his exciting year with the Rabbitohs in the 2014 NRL season with him playing 24 matches and scoring 12 tries. On 14 October 2014, Inglis was selected in the Australia Kangaroos 24-man 2014 Four Nations squad.

=== 2015 ===
On 20 January 2015, Inglis was appointed leader of the South Sydney Rabbitohs, taking over from previous captain John Sutton due to an incident that involved Sutton in Arizona. In January 2015, Australian rugby sevens coach Geraint John revealed plans to sign NRL players for the 2016 Olympics and mentioned Inglis by name. A quote from Inglis in February 2015 in which he stated he was considering his options beyond 2015 sparked interest from several football codes. In March 2015, it was revealed that French rugby union club Toulouse had offered Inglis a contract worth $1.5 million a year. On 13 February 2015, Inglis was selected at fullback for Indigenous All Stars for the 2015 Harvey Norman Rugby League All Stars match at Cbus Super Stadium. Inglis scored a try in the indigenous side's 20–6 win over the NRL All Stars. On 23 February 2015, Inglis captained the Rabbitohs in the 2015 World Club Challenge match against 2014 Super League champions St. Helens. Inglis scored a try in the record 39–0 win at Langtree Park. For the 2015 Anzac Test, Inglis was selected for Australia against New Zealand, playing at fullback in the Kangaroos 26–12 loss at Suncorp Stadium. Inglis also played centre and fullback for Queensland in the 2015 State of Origin series. After a tight loss to New South Wales in the previous year, Inglis scored two tries in their 11–10 win and record breaking 52–6 win against New South Wales. In Round 21 against the Penrith Panthers, Inglis celebrated his 100th NRL career game wearing the red-and-green jersey against in the Rabbitohs 20–16 win at ANZ Stadium. Inglis finished the 2015 NRL season with him playing in 20 matches and scoring 8 tries for the Rabbitohs. On 15 December, Inglis was named at fullback for the Indigenous All Stars team to play against the World All Stars on 13 February 2016.

=== 2016 ===
On 19 January, after Johnathan Thurston withdrew from the Indigenous All Stars squad, Inglis was appointed as the new captain for the team. On 13 February, Inglis played at fullback against the World All Stars team, in the 12–8 loss at Suncorp Stadium.

Inglis started the 2016 NRL season playing fullback. After an inconsistent display in the opening 9 rounds the season, Australian Test coach Mal Meninga selected Inglis at centre, with fellow Queensland Origin teammate and close friend Darius Boyd being selected to play at fullback for the 2016 Anzac Test. Inglis scored a try in the 16–0 win. Following the Trans-Tasman Test match, Souths coach Michael Maguire shifted Inglis to five-eighth for the Round 10 match against the Parramatta Eels, with Luke Keary moving to the bench. This was his third positional change in 2 weeks and after producing a strong performance, Inglis was retained at five-eighth for the next game against the Dragons. As expected, Inglis was selected for the Queensland State of Origin side, and played in the centres for Game I and II, which were both QLD wins. For the Rabbitohs round 16 clash against the Penrith Panthers, Inglis was switched back into the centres from five-eighth after producing a poor performance in the Round 14 game against the Tigers. In Origin III, Inglis was charged for an alleged shoulder charge on Josh Dugan which saw him get suspended for three weeks. When he returned for South Sydney in Round 22, he was named at five-eighth again, but soon shifted to the fullback position in his side's narrow 15–14 loss to the Melbourne Storm. He retained the position for the following match against the New-Zealand Warriors and scored a try in his sides 22–41 win.

Inglis was named captain of the Australian Prime Minister's XIII for their match against Papua New Guinea.

On 7 October 2016, Greg signed a new 3-year contract to see him play for the South Sydney Rabbitohs until 2020.

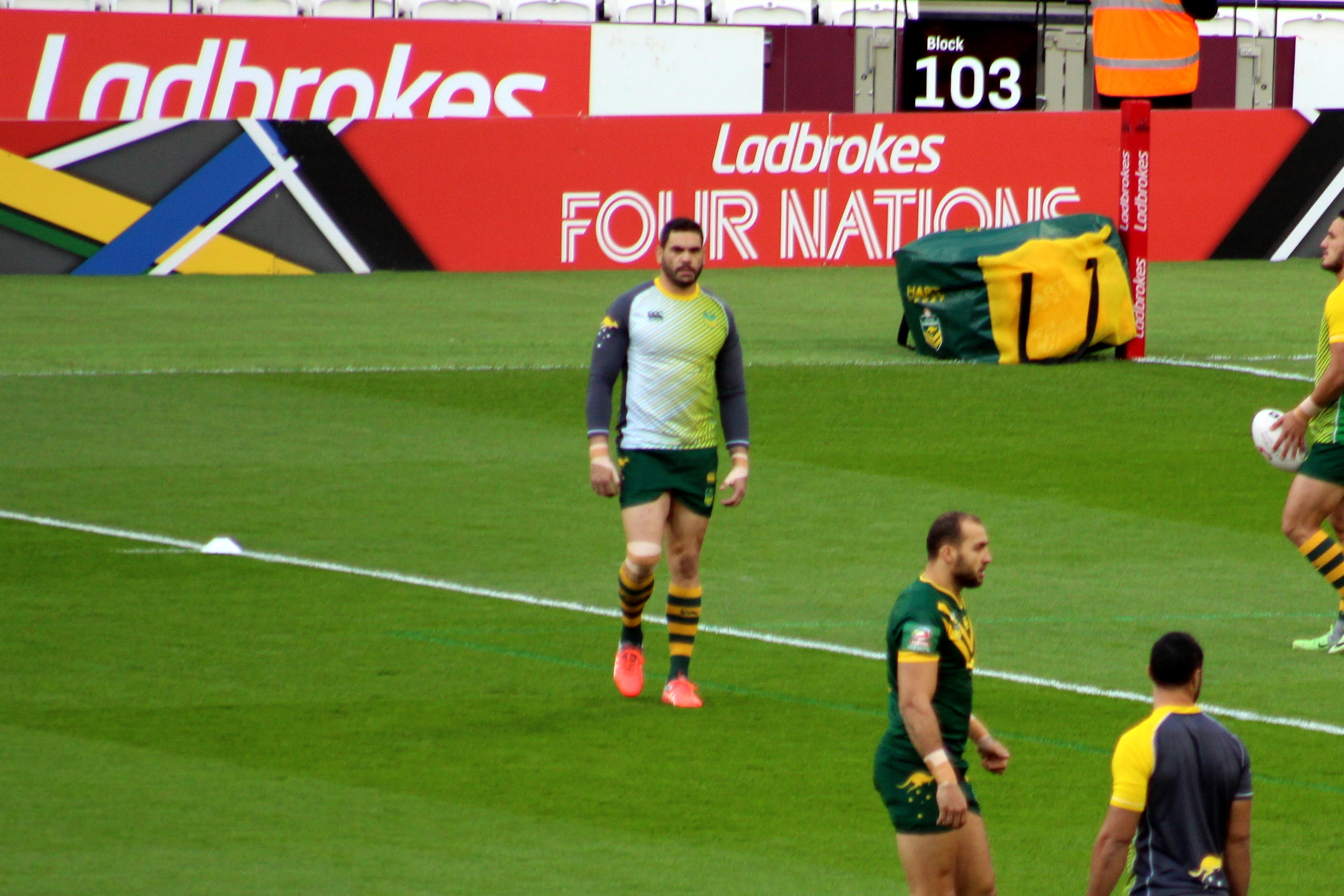
Inglis warming up for Australia at the London Stadium in 2016

=== 2017 ===
Inglis started the year, being selected as usual in the Indigenous All Stars team for the Rugby League All Stars game, playing at Centre.

After starting round 1 of the 2017 NRL season playing at Fullback in the Rabbitohs' home game clash against the Tigers at ANZ Stadium, Inglis suffered a season-ending anterior cruciate ligament (ACL) knee injury.

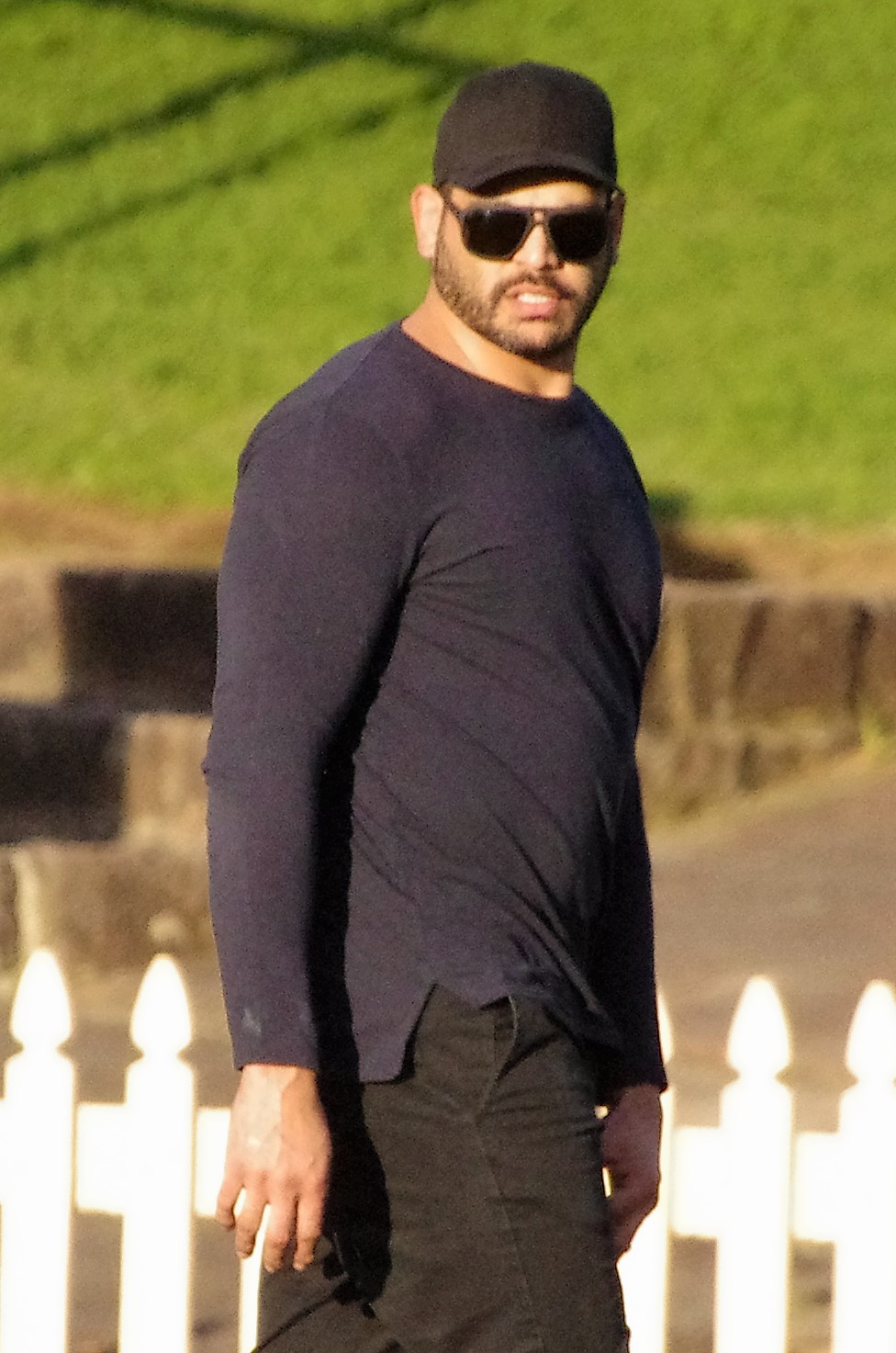
Inglis at a North Sydney Bears game in 2017

=== 2018 ===
Inglis was chosen to be the captain of the Queensland Maroons by coach Kevin Walters for State of Origin. Inglis made 19 appearances and scored 10 tries for Souths in 2018 as the club finished 3rd on the table at the end of the regular season. Souths fell one game short of a grand final appearance losing to Eastern Suburbs 12–4 in the preliminary final. On 1 October, Inglis was stripped of the Australian captaincy after being charged by police for drink driving and speeding offences. Inglis was arrested and taken to Lithgow Police Station where he underwent breath analysis and allegedly returned a reading of 0.085.

=== 2019 ===
On 14 January, Inglis was handed an 18-month good behaviour bond at Downing Centre local court in relation to being charged with drink driving back in October 2018.

On 15 April 2019, Inglis announced his immediate retirement from the NRL.

On 30 August 2019, Inglis was announced at centre in the Queensland Maroons Team of the Decade.

=== 2020 ===
On 19 May 2020, it was announced Inglis would come out of retirement to play for Super League side Warrington in 2021. He signed an initial one-year contract to keep him at the club until the end of the 2021 Super League Season.

=== 2021 ===
In round 5 of the 2021 Super League season, Inglis made his debut for Warrington and scored a try in the club's 50-26 victory over Hull KR. After just three appearances for Warrington, Inglis badly tore his hamstring and agreed in July 2021 to mutually terminate his playing contract, staying on at the club as a volunteer in a mentoring role until the end of the 2021 season.

=== Hall of Fame ===
In August 2024, the National Rugby League announced that Inglis was an inductee into the National Rugby League Hall of Fame. Inglis, who was ascribed Hall of Fame number 125, was amongst eleven male players in the 2024 Class.

== Personal life ==
In August 2009, Inglis was charged with recklessly causing injury and unlawful assault in relation to his then girlfriend Sally Robinson. Robinson was left with black eyes as a result of the alleged incident. In April 2010 Inglis was ordered to complete a behavioural change program after accepting responsibility for pushing Robinson in the August 2009 incident.

In June 2010, Inglis announced his engagement to Robinson. Inglis and Robinson married on 5 December 2010 at the Twin Waters Resort in Maroochydore.

His cousins include Albert Kelly of Hull FC, former Parramatta Eels player Beau Champion, and former Gold Coast Titans player and 2001 Dally M winner Preston Campbell.

Inglis was very close to Australian former Cricket Player Phil Hughes. He grew up playing junior Rugby League and Cricket in New South Wales with him, as well as playing junior sports with him and was very grieved at the 25-year-old's untimely death after being hit in the neck by a bouncer during a Sheffield Shield game.

In June 2019, Inglis was diagnosed with a Bipolar II disorder, following another stint in rehabilitation for alcohol problems and depression. "To get that diagnosed made me understand things a lot clearer about myself," Inglis said. "When I was in a high, I would train the best, lift the best in the gym, be so good at everything I did. But when I was feeling down, I just shut down and before I knew it, just snap."

== Post playing ==
On 14 August 2024, Inglis was inducted into the NRL Hall of Fame.

On 30 January 2025 the Wests Tigers announced that Inglis had joined the Tigers NRLW squad as part of the coaching staff working alongside the teams outside backs. A few days later on 4 February Inglis joined the coaching staff of the Queensland Women's State of Origin squad.

== Greg Inglis clothing ==
In July 2012 Inglis released his own range of clothing with the initials GI and a silhouette of "Greg" fending off the opposition similar in style to Air Jordan, the iconic silhouette used for the Michael Jordan brand of clothing.

== Statistics ==
=== NRL ===
†	Denotes seasons in which Inglis won an NRL Premiership
†	Denotes seasons in which Inglis won an NRL Premiership that was later stripped

Season	Team	Matches	T	G	GK %	F/G	Pts	W	L	D	W-L %
2005	Melbourne Storm	13	7	0	—	0	28	7	6	0	53.8
2006	Melbourne Storm	19	18	2	40.0	0	76	15	4	0	78.9
2007†	Melbourne Storm	20	9	0	—	0	36	17	3	0	85.0
2008	Melbourne Storm	22	17	0	—	1	69	17	5	0	77.3
2009†	Melbourne Storm	23	16	0	0.0	2	66	15	7	1	67.4
2010	Melbourne Storm	20	11	7	70.0	0	58	12	8	0	60.0
2011	South Sydney Rabbitohs	18	8	0	—	0	32	9	9	0	50.0
2012	South Sydney Rabbitohs	22	12	0	—	1	49	13	9	0	59.1
2013	South Sydney Rabbitohs	20	14	0	—	0	56	16	4	0	80.0
2014†	South Sydney Rabbitohs	24	13	0	—	0	52	16	8	0	66.7
2015	South Sydney Rabbitohs	20	8	0	—	0	32	12	8	0	60.0
2016	South Sydney Rabbitohs	20	5	0	—	0	20	9	11	0	45.0
2017	South Sydney Rabbitohs	1	1	0	—	0	4	0	1	0	0
2018	South Sydney Rabbitohs	19	10				40				
2019	South Sydney Rabbitohs	2									
2021	Warrington Wolves	3	2				4				
Career totals		267	151	9	56.3	4	630	158	83	1	65.29

= Unfinished season

=== State of Origin ===
†	Denotes seasons in which Inglis won a State of Origin Series

Season	Team	Matches	T	G	GK %	F/G	Pts	W	L	D	W-L %
2006†	Queensland	1	2	0	0.0	0	8	0	1	0	0.0
2007†	Queensland	3	3	0	—	0	12	2	1	0	66.7
2008†	Queensland	3	0	0	—	0	0	2	1	0	66.7
2009†	Queensland	3	3	0	—	0	12	2	1	0	66.7
2010†	Queensland	3	2	0	—	0	8	3	0	0	100
2011†	Queensland	2	2	0	—	0	8	1	1	0	50.0
2012†	Queensland	3	2	0	—	0	0	2	1	0	66.7
2013†	Queensland	3	1	0	—	0	4	2	1	0	66.7
2014	Queensland	3	0	0	—	0	0	1	2	0	33.3
2015†	Queensland	3	2	0	—	0	8	2	1	0	66.7
2016†	Queensland	3	1	0	—	0	4	2	1	0	66.7
Career totals		27	18	0	—	0	72	19	8	0	70

=== Australia ===
Season	Team	Matches	T	G	GK %	F/G	Pts	W	L	D	W-L %
2006	Australia	5	4	0	—	0	16	4	1	0	80.0
2007	Australia	1	3	0	—	0	12	1	0	0	100
2008	Australia	5	6	0	—	0	24	4	1	0	80.0
2009	Australia	4	2	0	—	0	8	3	0	1	87.5
2010	Australia	1	0	0	—	0	0	1	0	0	100
2011	Australia	4	3	0	—	0	12	4	0	0	100
2012	Australia	2	1	0	—	0	4	2	0	0	100
2013	Australia	6	3	0	—	0	12	6	0	0	100
2014	Australia	5	6	0	—	0	24	3	2	0	60
2015	Australia	1	0	0	—	0	0	0	1	0	0
2016	Australia	5	4	0	—	0	20	5	0	0	100
Career totals		39	31	0	—	0	124	33	5	1	85.90

== Awards and honours ==
Individual

- 2006 Rugby League International Federation International Newcomer of the Year Award
- 2007 Melbourne Storm Team of the Decade (Centre)
- 2007 Clive Churchill Medallist
- 2008 Indigenous Team of the Century (Centre)
- 2008 Dally M Peter Frilingos Memorial Award for the headline moment of the year
- 2008 Dally M Five-eighth of the Year
- 2008 Dally M Representative Player of the Year
- 2009 Wally Lewis Medallist
- 2009 Dally M Representative Player of the Year
- 2009 Melbourne Storm Back of the Year Award
- 2009 Rugby League Four Nations Player of the Tournament
- 2009 Golden Boot Award Rugby League World International Player of the Year
- 2013 Dally M Fullback of the Year
- 2013 Dally M Provan-Summons Medallist
- 2024 National Rugby League Hall of Fame inductee: #125

Melbourne Storm

- 2006 NRL Grand Final Runner-up
- 2007 NRL Grand Final Winners (Stripped)
- 2008 NRL Grand Final Runner-up
- 2009 NRL Grand Final Winners (Stripped)
- 2010 World Club Challenge Winners

South Sydney Rabbitohs

- 2014 NRL Grand Final Winners

=== Goanna celebration ===
During his rugby league career, Inglis has been well known for his post-try celebration where he imitates the 'Goanna'.

== Accolades ==
In August 2008, Inglis was named at centre in the Indigenous Team of the Century.

Awards and achievements
Preceded by Manu Vatuvei (New Zealand)	Rugby League International Federation International Newcomer of the Year; 2006	Succeeded by Israel Folau (Australia)
Preceded by Shaun Berrigan (Brisbane Broncos)	Clive Churchill Medallist; 2007	Succeeded by Brent Kite (Manly-Warringah Sea Eagles)
Preceded by Darren Lockyer (Brisbane Broncos)	Dally M Five-eighth of the Year; 2008	Succeeded by Jamie Soward (St. George Illawarra Dragons)
Preceded by Cameron Smith (Queensland & Australia)	Dally M Representative Player of the Year; 2008, 2009	Succeeded by Billy Slater (Queensland & Australia)
Preceded by Johnathan Thurston (North Queensland Cowboys)	Wally Lewis Medallist; 2009	Succeeded by Billy Slater (Melbourne Storm, Queensland & Australia)
Preceded by Billy Slater (Melbourne Storm, Queensland & Australia)	Golden Boot Award Rugby League World International Player of the Year; 2009	Succeeded by Benji Marshall (Wests Tigers & (New Zealand)
