= 2007 State of Origin series =

Australian rugby league series

- Won by: Queensland (12th title)
- Series margin: 2-1
- Points scored: 81 (NSW 42 QLD 39)
- Attendance: 181,891 (ave. 60,630 per match)
- Top points scorer(s): Greg Inglis (12)
- Top try scorer(s): Greg Inglis (3)

The 2007 State of Origin series was the 26th year that the annual best-of-three series of interstate rugby league football matches between the Queensland and New South Wales representative teams was contested entirely under 'state of origin' selection rules. Queensland won the series by winning the first two games. New South Wales avoided the whitewash by winning the third match held at Suncorp Stadium. The Wally Lewis Medal for player of the series was awarded to Queensland's hooker, Cameron Smith.

== Game I ==
Ten thousand tickets to Game I at Suncorp Stadium were sold in seven minutes when they went on sale in March 2007 and all were sold within four hours. Queensland was the bookies' favourites on match day, despite the loss of Carl Webb to a hamstring injury.

Wednesday, 23 May 2007

Queensland	25 – 18	New South Wales
Johnathan Thurston (9 - 4g,1fg); Greg Inglis (8 - 2t); Steve Price (4 - 1t); Darren Lockyer (4 - 1t)	(Report)	Jamie Lyon (6 - 3g); Nathan Hindmarsh (4 - 1t); Matt Cooper (4 - 1t); Jarryd Hayne (4 - 1t)

Suncorp Stadium, Brisbane
Attendance: 52,498
Referee: Paul Simpkins
Player of the Match: Johnathan Thurston

Queensland trailed 6-18 at half-time after a spectacular kick-and-chase solo effort by Jarryd Hayne resulted in a try right on halftime. Queensland recovered after the break with three converted tries including one which followed Darren Lockyer's interception of a wild pass made by Hayne near the New South Wales goal line. Johnathan Thurston later kicked a field goal to put the final score at 25-18. This win saw Queensland claim three consecutive match victories for the first time since 1995's shock whitewash. Thurston was named man-of-the-match. The Blues' Danny Buderus and Kurt Gidley were injured in the match, while Maroons' substitute Antonio Kaufusi suffered a season-ending knee injury in his Origin debut.

== Game II ==
Brett Stewart was called in to make his Origin debut only 24 hours prior to the match as a replacement for the injured Anthony Minichiello. The Maroons went into this match having never won an Origin match at Telstra Stadium in 11 outings. It was also referee Shane Hayne's first State of Origin match.

Wednesday, 13 June 2007

New South Wales	6 – 10	Queensland
Brett Stewart (4 - 1t); Jamie Lyon (2 -1g)	(Report)	Greg Inglis (4 - 1t); Steve Bell (4 - 1t); Johnathan Thurston (2 - 1g)

Telstra Stadium, Sydney
Attendance: 76,924
Referee: Shayne Hayne
Player of the Match: Cameron Smith

The opening minutes were almost all played in Queensland's half of the field, with the Maroons defending successfully until just before the eight-minute mark when Blues debutant fullback Brett Stewart scored the first points of the match with a close-range try from dummy half. Jamie Lyon's conversion brought the score to 6 - 0 in favour of New South Wales. Queensland then evened up the battle for field position, the game being played almost entirely in the Blues' half from then until the twenty-first minute when the Maroons scored. Their hooker Cameron Smith ran from dummy half on the fifth and last, down the short side and through his tacklers shot a remarkable pass out to the feet of Greg Inglis. Inglis then picked up the ball and crossed out wide (for the fifth time in only three Origin matches) to touch down after improving the field position for his kicker. Johnathan Thurston's conversion was successful so the score was 6 all with three quarters of the match remaining. Queensland dominated field position and crossed the Blues' try line three more times in the remainder of the first half but couldn't score, leaving the sides level at a single converted try each for the break.

The first penalty of the match was given after ten minutes of the second half, followed by the second eight minutes after that, providing the Blues with some attacking opportunities which they failed to convert to points. Following the third penalty of the match, which went Queensland's way, they were attacking the New South Wales line and got their second try on the sixty-three-minute mark. A pass (that appeared to be forward but was allowed by the referee) went to Thurston who, keeping the ball alive, chipped a grubbing kick through the line of defence for centre Steven Bell to pick up and dive over the try-line in the corner. The ensuing sideline conversion was missed by Thurston, leaving the score at 10 - 6 in favour of the Maroons. The following ten minutes were a fairly even arm wrestle played mostly in the middle of the field. With under three minutes remaining Brent Kite lost the ball in a tackle and Shaun Berrigan picked it up and ran 45 metres to put it down. However the try was disallowed by the video referee, ruling that Berrigan had also knocked the ball on when he picked it up. The Queenslanders managed to hold out New South Wales' desperate attack to leave the game at 10-6.

"This could be the start of a Queensland dynasty."

— Paul Vautin's reaction to the match.

Of the match, Queensland captain Lockyer had this to say: "In games I've been involved with, that's the gutsiest I've been in." It was the first win for Queensland at Telstra Stadium following an 11-game losing streak at the venue, and the first time the Maroons had won four consecutive Origin matches since their 8-game winning streak which lasted from game 2, 1987, to game 3, 1989. Meninga was critical of referee Shayne Hayne's performance in the match with no penalties until the 51st minute and a final count going New South Wales' way 4-1.

== Game III ==
Wednesday, 4 July 2007

Queensland	4 – 18	New South Wales
Justin Hodges (4 - 1t)	(Report)	Hazem El Masri (10 - 1t,3g); Jarryd Hayne (4 - 1t); Matt King (4 - 1t)

Suncorp Stadium, Brisbane
Attendance: 52,469
Referee: Paul Simpkins
Player of the Match: Greg Bird

In the first minute of game III, Dallas Johnson was knocked out cold when attempting a tackle and was assisted from the field. Greg Inglis injured his knee in the 20th minute, and Brent Tate left the field in the 33rd minute, also with a serious knee injury. New South Wales scored the first try in the 21st minute through Jarryd Hayne beating opposition players down the left corner. Queensland responded in the 26th minute with a try scored out wide by Justin Hodges. Thurston failed to convert leaving the score at 6-4 till half time. Queensland were without 3 reserves until Johnson returned early in the second half and played the rest of the game with only two reserves. This forced Queensland forwards such as Steve Price to play the full 80 minutes.

Queensland held off New South Wales' attacks for most of the second half. Matt Cooper was denied tries twice in the first 10 minutes, once by a last-ditch try-saving tackle by Bell on the try line. It was not till the 73rd minute that New South Wales' Matt King, in his farewell Origin performance having announced his intention to relocate the Super League in 2008, scored a try which was set up by a flat pass from eventual man-of-the-match Greg Bird. Hazem El Masri, in his debut performance for the Blues after an 11-year top-grade career, converted from the sideline, giving New South Wales an important 8-point lead. In the 79th minute, Paul Gallen was able to offload to El Masri on the tryline and the result was sealed. This try also brought New South Wales' points total for the series above that of Queensland.

Jarryd Hayne received the Brad Fittler Medal for New South Wales player of the series. Cameron Smith received the Ron McAuliffe Medal as Queensland's player of the series.

== Players ==
=== New South Wales ===
The Bulldogs and Knights contributed the most players, four each, to the total used by New South Wales during the series.

Position	Game 1	Game 2	Game 3
Fullback	Anthony Minichiello	Brett Stewart*	
Wing	Matt King		Hazem El Masri*
Centre	Jamie Lyon		Matt King
Centre	Matt Cooper		
Wing	Jarryd Hayne		
Five-Eighth	Braith Anasta		Greg Bird
Halfback	Jarrod Mullen	Brett Kimmorley	
Prop	Brett White	Willie Mason	
Hooker	Danny Buderus (c)		
Prop	Brent Kite		
Second Row	Nathan Hindmarsh		
Second Row	Willie Mason	Steve Simpson	Andrew Ryan
Lock	Andrew Ryan		Paul Gallen
Interchange	Luke Bailey		
Interchange	Steve Simpson	Brett White	Steve Simpson
Interchange	Anthony Tupou	Ryan Hoffman	
Interchange	Kurt Gidley	Greg Bird	Kurt Gidley
Coach	Graham Murray		

- Bulldogs Hazem El Masri was a late replacement for Jamie Lyon, who suffered a hamstring injury in Manly's loss to the Bulldogs in the round before game III.
- Manly's Brett Stewart took the place of Anthony Minichiello who succumbed to a back injury.

=== Queensland ===
2007's defending premiers, the Brisbane Broncos were the most heavily represented club in the Maroons, with eight players.

Position	Game 1	Game 2	Game 3
Fullback	Karmichael Hunt		
Wing	Brent Tate		
Centre	Justin Hodges		
Centre	Steven Bell		
Wing	Greg Inglis		
Five-Eighth	Darren Lockyer (c)		
Halfback	Johnathan Thurston		
Prop	Petero Civoniceva		
Hooker	Cameron Smith		
Prop	Steve Price		
Second Row	Tonie Carroll		
Second Row	Nate Myles	Carl Webb	
Lock	Dallas Johnson		
Interchange	Shaun Berrigan		
Interchange	Jacob Lillyman		Matt Bowen*
Interchange	Neville Costigan		Dane Carlaw*
Interchange	Antonio Kaufusi*	Nate Myles	
Coach	Mal Meninga		

- Carl Webb (second row) was selected to play in game I but ruled out due to injury. He was replaced by Antonio Kaufusi, on the bench, with Nate Myles going to the second row. Webb was selected for game II following the injury of Kaufusi during game I.
- Jacob Lillyman was chosen for the interchange bench in game III, but ruled out due to injury. He was replaced by Matt Bowen.
- Neville Costigan was also selected for game III, on the interchange bench, but injured his hand on match eve. He was replaced by Dane Carlaw.

== See also ==
- 2007 NRL season
