= Ryan Shortland =

NZ rugby union & league footballer

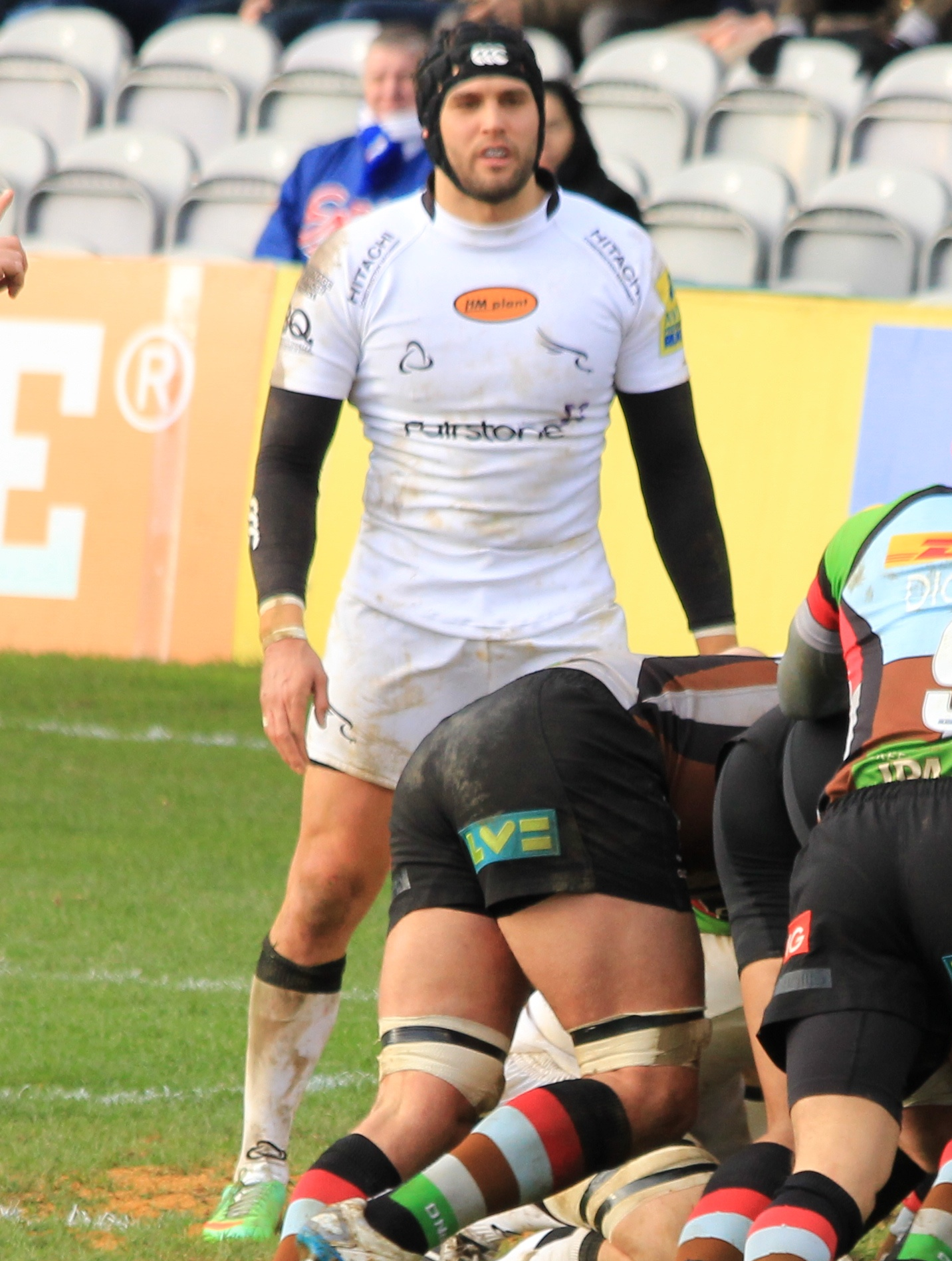

Personal information
- Born: 27 January 1986 (age 40) Masterton, New Zealand
- Height: 185 cm (6 ft 1 in)
- Weight: 94 kg (14 st 11 lb)

Playing information

Rugby league
- Position: Centre
Club
Years	Team	Pld	T	G	FG	P
2007	Melbourne Storm	1	0	0	0	0
2008	New Zealand Warriors	5	3	0	0	12
	Total	6	3	0	0	12

Rugby union
- Position: Wing
Club
Years	Team	Pld	T	G	FG	P
2009–10	Otago	17	3	0	0	15
2011–14	Newcastle Falcons	49	9	0	0	45
	Total	66	12	0	0	60
- Source: As of 7 April 2022

Ryan Shortland (born 27 January 1986 in Masterton, New Zealand) is a former rugby union player who last played for the Newcastle Falcons in the Aviva Premiership. Before switching to rugby union, he previously played rugby league in the NRL.

== Rugby league ==
Of Māori heritage, Shortland was born in Masterton but grew up in Australia. Shortland started playing rugby league for the Coogee Randwick Wombats in Sydney.

Shortland signed with the Melbourne Storm and was sent by the Storm to play in the Queensland Cup with the Norths Devils.

He played one first grade game for the club in Round 2 of 2007. A knee ligament injury playing for Brisbane Norths in the Queensland Cup ended Shortland's season soon after.

Shortland signed a one-year contract with the New Zealand Warriors for the 2008 season. He was limited to just five appearances in first grade, being stuck behind international centres Brent Tate and Jerome Ropati. As a result, he was not re-signed for the 2009 season.

== Rugby union ==
After being released by the Warriors, Shortland set his sights on a career in rugby union so he could stay in New Zealand. In late 2008 he played for the New Zealand Barbarians against the All Blacks in a warm up match before their Grand Slam tour. After talks with several rugby unions Shortland signed with the newly promoted Taieri in Otago and then made the Otago team for the 2009 Air New Zealand Cup.

Shortland got off to a promising start for Otago in the 2009 Air New Zealand Cup, scoring 3 tries in 10 appearances, and was included in the Highlanders wider training group for the 2010 Super 14 season. However, like the rest of his team, Shortland struggled in the 2010 ITM Cup, failing to score a try in 9 matches.

After leaving Otago, Shortland moved to England, where he played with the Newcastle Falcons of the Aviva Premiership, having debuted in the 2011–12 season. He played three seasons with the Falcons, his last coming in 2013–14.
