= James Aubusson =

Australian rugby league footballer

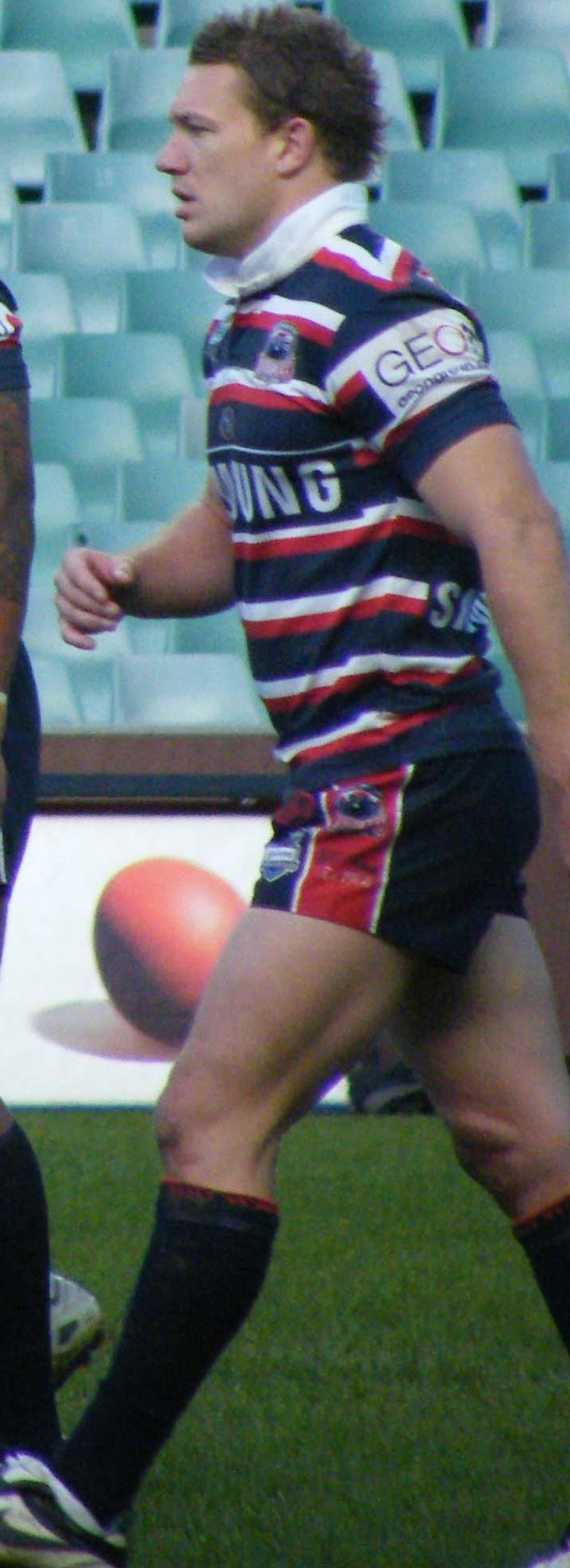

Personal information
- Full name: James Aubusson
- Born: 14 December 1986 (age 39) Sydney, New South Wales, Australia

Playing information
- Height: 179 cm (5 ft 10 in)
- Weight: 87 kg (13 st 10 lb)
- Position: Hooker, Halfback
Club
Years	Team	Pld	T	G	FG	P
2007	Melbourne Storm	16	1	0	0	4
2008–10	Sydney Roosters	42	2	0	0	8
	Total	58	3	0	0	12
- Relatives: Mitchell Aubusson (brother)

James Aubusson (born 14 December 1986 in Sydney, New South Wales) is an Australian former professional rugby league footballer who played in 2000s and 2010s. He played for the Sydney Roosters and the Melbourne Storm in the Australian National Rugby League (NRL) competition. Aubusson spent most of his career at hooker.

== Early life ==
Aubusson was educated at St John's College, Woodlawn, where he represented 2003 Australian Schoolboys.

== Playing career ==
He made his NRL debut in round 1 of the 2007 NRL season for Melbourne Storm against the Wests Tigers.

Aubusson signed a three-year contract with the Sydney Roosters until the end of the 2010 NRL season, a move that re-united him with his younger brother, Mitchell.

In the 2008 NRL season, Aubusson made 23 appearances as the Sydney Roosters qualified for the finals. Aubusson played in the club's semi-final loss against the New Zealand Warriors. The following year, Aubusson was limited to nine games as the Sydney Roosters finished last on the table which had not happened to the club since 1966. In the 2010 NRL season, the club had a complete form reversal and reached the 2010 NRL Grand Final. Aubusson played in the club's victory over the Gold Coast in the preliminary final but missed out on selection for the decider.

== Coaching career ==
In November 2010, Aubusson announced he would coach the Goulburn Workers Bulldogs for three seasons beginning in 2011 after being released by the Sydney Roosters.

== Career highlights ==
- Junior Representative: 2003, Australian Schoolboys; 2005, New South Wales U19 and Junior Kangaroo selection
- First Grade Debut: Melbourne Storm v Wests Tigers, 16 March 2007 (Round 1) at Olympic Park.
