= Dallas Johnson =

Australia international rugby league footballer

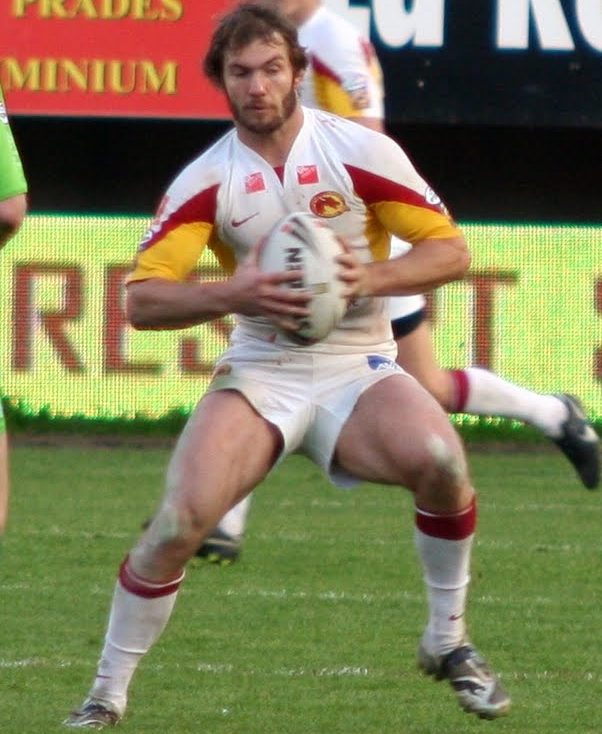

Personal information
- Born: 23 November 1982 (age 43) Herberton, Queensland, Australia

Playing information
- Height: 183 cm (6 ft 0 in)
- Weight: 93 kg (14 st 9 lb)
- Position: Lock
Club
Years	Team	Pld	T	G	FG	P
2003–09	Melbourne Storm	157	12	0	0	48
2010	Catalans Dragons	28	1	0	0	4
2011–13	North Qld Cowboys	65	2	0	0	8
	Total	250	15	0	0	60
Representative
Years	Team	Pld	T	G	FG	P
2006–09	Queensland	12	1	0	0	4
2007	Australia	1	0	0	0	0

Dallas Johnson (born 23 November 1982) is an Australian former professional rugby league footballer who played between 2003 and 2013. An Australia national and Queensland State of Origin representative forward, he played his club football in the National Rugby League (NRL) for the Australian clubs Melbourne Storm and North Queensland Cowboys, and in the Super League for French club Catalans Dragons.

Between 2006 and 2009, Johnson played in four consecutive NRL grand finals for the Melbourne Storm, of which the club won two, only for both to be stripped due to salary cap breaches. He has represented the Queensland Maroons in four State of Origin series and played one match for the Australian national team. He is known for his prolific tackling.

== Background ==
Johnson was born in Herberton, Queensland on 23 November 1982, and was raised on his family's farm on Queensland's Atherton Tablelands and educated at Atherton State High School. He played his junior football in his town of Atherton Roosters, where he was the captain of the Roosters under 18 premiership in 1999. There he was scouted by the Melbourne Storm.

== Professional playing career ==
=== Melbourne Storm ===
After playing in the Queensland Cup for the Storm's affiliate Norths Devils, Johnson moved to the Storm for the 2003 season.

He played in the Storm's opening match of the season, alongside fellow first-grade debutant and future Australian and Queensland fullback Billy Slater. Johnson appeared in 20 first-grade matches that season, and the following year extended his contract.

After three seasons of regular first-grade football, Johnson earned representative honours in 2006, being selected for Queensland in the State of Origin series. He started in all three matches of the series, which Queensland won.

Later that year he played in Melbourne's grand final loss to Brisbane.

Johnson was a key member of Melbourne's team of 2007, making an average of 36 tackles a match. Melbourne won the season's grand final against the Manly-Warringah Sea Eagles, but in 2010 were stripped of their premiership after the NRL discovered large-scale breaches of the league's salary cap.

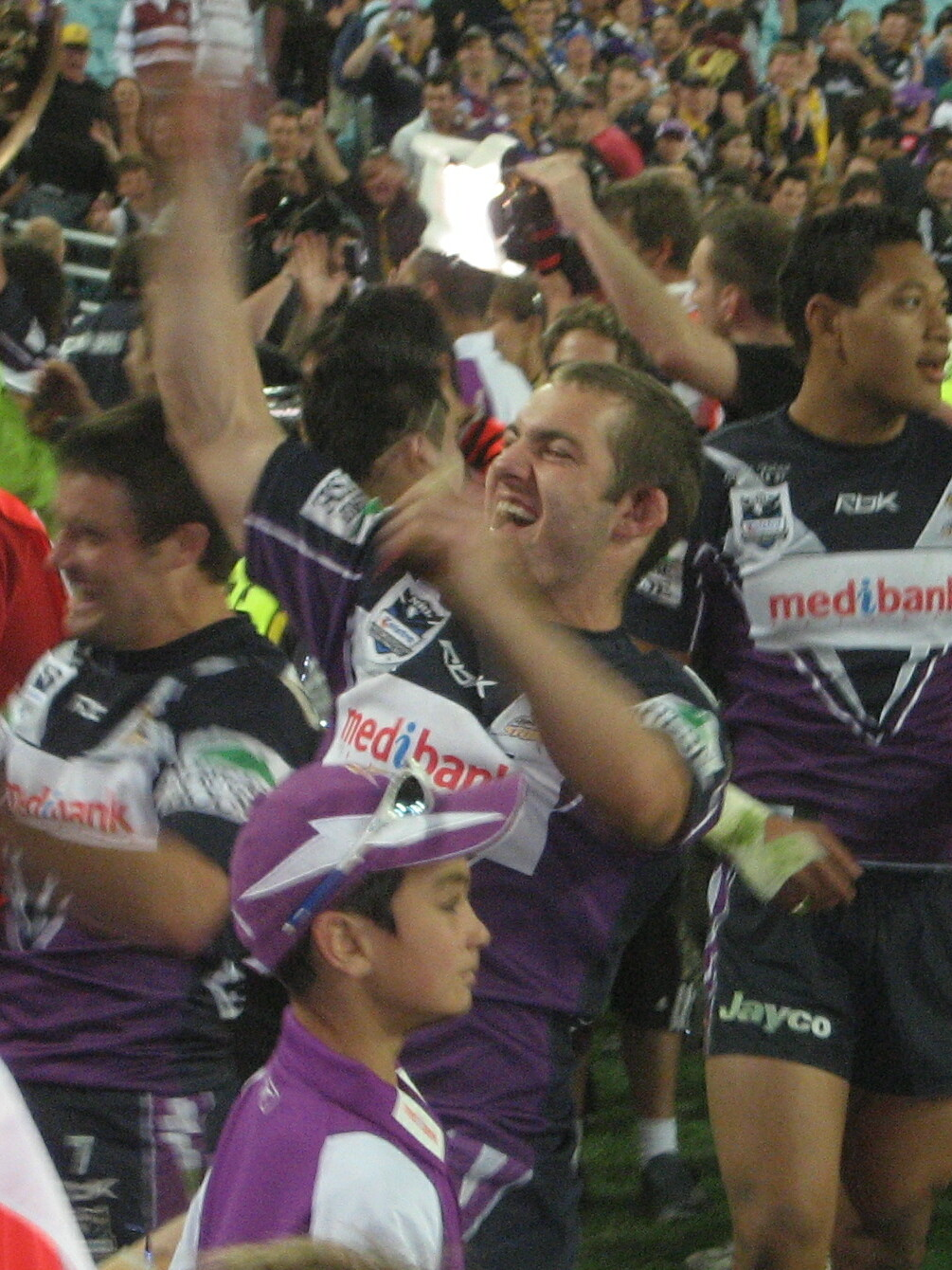
Johnson celebrating victory in the 2007 NRL Grand Final

Johnson's 2007 form was rewarded by his selection in the Australian Kangaroos team for a Test against New Zealand in October.

In the same season, he made a record-breaking 62 tackles in Queensland's victory over New South Wales in the second match of the 2007 State of Origin series. In the third match, he was taken from the field in the first half after suffering a concussion. Queensland's medical staff controversially allowed him to return to the field in the second half, where he make 25 tackles.

Johnson played his 150th match for Melbourne during the 2008 NRL season; achieving the same milestone with Billy Slater who made his debut alongside Johnson in 2003. He would again feature in the grand final, with the Storm defeated by Manly.

Johnson was named in the preliminary 46-man Australian squad for the 2008 Rugby League World Cup; however, he missed out on selection in the final squad of 24 players.

Johnson again represented Queensland in all three matches of the 2008 State of Origin series, which Queensland won. Johnson again suffered a head injury, in the opening match of the series, leading some to question the safety of his low tackling style (in other words, his preference to tackle a player around his legs rather than his torso).

2009 would be Johnson's last season at Melbourne. After the end of the season he signed a three-year contract with the French club Catalans Dragons in the Super League. His final season for Melbourne was a success: he played in the Storm's grand final win over the Parramatta Eels although, as in 2007, the Storm were later stripped of their premiership due to large-scale breaches of the league's salary cap.

Johnson again played in all three matches of the 2009 State of Origin series, as Queensland won their fourth series in a row. He scored the opening try in the third match, his first in State of Origin, when he fell onto a Johnathan Thurston grubber kick.

=== Catalans Dragons ===
Moving to France, Johnson would play under the coaching of his fellow Queenslander Kevin Walters, who declared Johnson to be a "champion player" with "exceptional defensive skills". Johnson played in 26 matches for the Dragons in the 2010 season; the club finished on the bottom of the Super League ladder. Johnson left the club at the end of the season, with two years left on his contract, to return to the NRL for the North Queensland Cowboys. Johnson claimed that a return to Australia would be better for his family, his daughter having been born during the 2010 season. He signed a three-year contract with the Cowboys starting in 2011.

=== North Queensland Cowboys ===
By April 2011, Johnson had broken the Cowboys' record for the most tackles in a game, making 64 in a defeat by the Parramatta Eels. He also broke the Cowboys' record for the most tackles by a player in a season, with 1,006, averaging 41.9 per game. While a regular member of a Cowboys team that spent much of the season in the top four on the NRL ladder, he missed out on selection for the State of Origin series.

Darren Lockyer, under whose captaincy Johnson played for Queensland, described Johnson as a "tackling machine", who would get knocked out "countless times... and get back up". Johnson's coach at the Melbourne Storm, Craig Bellamy, commented upon Johnson's departure from the club that he was "the toughest player I have ever seen".

Johnson who missed out on Origin selection in 2011, was named 18th man for the second origin game in Sydney after vice-captain Sam Thaiday pulled out with a shoulder injury. Many media outlets and reporters said Johnson was the best signing of 2011 for the Cowboys and has continued to be a stand out performer for the club over two seasons, averaging 42 tackles a game, and adds a lot of leadership and stability to the club - which coach Neil Henry has said about him.

Johnson made his 200th NRL appearance in round 21, 2012 against the Canterbury Bulldogs, in a match where Johnson was named man of the match in a losing Cowboys side. Johnson made 51 tackles and 75 metres from 10 hit-ups in the game. In the week heading into the game, teammates said Dallas Johnson was as important to the team as club co-captains Johnathan Thurston and Matthew Scott.

In 2013 Johnson announced that it would be his last season but was forced into retirement earlier due to a mid-season knee injury.
