= Brett White =

Australia & Ireland international rugby league footballer and coach

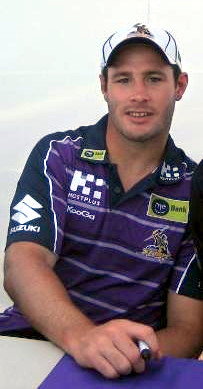

Personal information
- Born: 8 April 1982 (age 44) Cooma, New South Wales, Australia
- Height: 188 cm (6 ft 2 in)
- Weight: 110 kg (17 st 5 lb)

Playing information
- Position: Prop
Club
| Years | Team | Pld | T | G | FG | P |
|---|---|---|---|---|---|---|
| 2005–10 | Melbourne Storm | 127 | 6 | 0 | 0 | 24 |
| 2011–14 | Canberra Raiders | 69 | 0 | 0 | 0 | 0 |
| | Total | 196 | 6 | 0 | 0 | 24 |
Representative
| Years | Team | Pld | T | G | FG | P |
| 2006–10 | Country Origin | 5 | 0 | 0 | 0 | 0 |
| 2007–10 | New South Wales | 8 | 1 | 0 | 0 | 4 |
| 2009 | Australia | 3 | 0 | 0 | 0 | 0 |
| 2013 | Ireland | 3 | 0 | 0 | 0 | 0 |
- Source: NRL Stats, RLP

Brett White (born 8 April 1982) is a former professional rugby league footballer who played for the Canberra Raiders and the Melbourne Storm in the National Rugby League (NRL). Both an Ireland and Australian international, and New South Wales State of Origin representative prop forward, he played the majority of his career at the Storm, before signing with the Canberra Raiders from 2011. In 2009, White married Cassie Adland, with whom he has four children.

== Background ==
Born in Cooma, New South Wales, Australia and grew up in Berridale, New South Wales. White was educated at Monaro High School.

Brett played his junior rugby league with Cooma Colts. He was a promising junior and was graded by St. George Illawarra Dragons from school.

== Playing career ==
White was a key member of the Dragon's Jersey Flegg Cup team, but leg and ankle injuries halted his progress in 2003 and 2004. With props such as Luke Bailey and Jason Ryles ahead of him, White was unable to make his way into first-grade and he relocated to the Melbourne Storm.

White made his first-grade debut in Round one, 2005, scoring a try against the Newcastle Knights at Olympic Park. At the end of the season he was named the Storm's Rookie of the Year after becoming Robbie Kearns' starting front-row partner. He was a member of the Melbourne Storm team to face the Brisbane Broncos in the 2006 NRL Grand Final, losing 15–8. The next year, he was a member of the winning grand final against Manly.

White played in the 2008 NRL Grand Final, in which his team was defeated by the Manly Sea Eagles.

He played in the 2009 premiership against Parramatta. In 2010, both premierships that White won with Melbourne were stripped by the NRL for major and deliberate breaches of the salary cap.

In August 2014, White officially announced he would be retiring from the NRL at the end of the season.

=== Controversies ===
White's first grade career have involved some controversial incidents. In round 14, 2006, White lodged a biting complaint against Parramatta's Fuifui Moimoi for which Moimoi was later exonerated after a lengthy judiciary hearing. He was also again in the act against Parramatta in 2007, accused of a chicken wing tackle on their captain Nathan Cayless in that year's preliminary final. In round 2, 2008, White was sent off for retaliating to a Ben Ross elbow to team-mate Cooper Cronk which also saw Ross sent off. Cronk's kick found Israel Folau who scored the match-leveling try. He was given a four match ban.

In 2009, White was involved in an infamous Origin fight with Steve Price in back play towards the end of Game 3 of the State of Origin series, resulting in Price being knocked out, Trent Waterhouse being sent off and much ill-feeling spilling over into scuffles in the last couple of minutes of play.

== Representative career ==
In 2006, White made his representative debut in the Country Origin team, defeating City by 12–10.

White was selected to represent New South Wales as a front-rower for game I and on the bench for game II of the 2007 State of Origin series.

In 2008, White made himself available for Ireland's 2008 Rugby League World Cup campaign and in August he was named in the Ireland training squad. Although White was named in the Irish squad, he was forced to withdraw following the NRL grand final, when he was scheduled for foot surgery.

White was also named in the 46-man Australian preliminary squad for the World Cup.

White played in the opening two State of Origin matches for New South Wales in 2010, scoring a try in the second match, but was dropped for the third game.

=== Steve Price incident ===
Game 3 of the 2009 series also saw White return to State of Origin (replacing the injured Michael Weyman), playing a leading role in a controversial NSW victory. In the closing stages of the contest, White was involved in a scuffle with Queensland prop Steve Price, which left Price unconscious.

== Post playing ==
In 2017 White joined the Canberra Raiders coaching staff as an assistant coach after coaching the now defunct NYC Under 20s competition. White was announced as part of the Titans coaching staff on 31 August 2022 after being on staff for the Canberra Raiders. On 30 November 2023, White was announced as part of the new look New South Wales Blues coaching staff.

On 2 September 2025, following the sacking of Titans coach Des Hasler, the Titans announced that White and two other members of Hasler's coaching staff would depart the club at the end of the season. On 24 September 2025, it was reported that White would join the Knights as an assistant coach. On 15 October 2025, the Knights confirmed White had joined the coaching staff.
