= Antonio Kaufusi =

Australia and Tonga international rugby league footballer

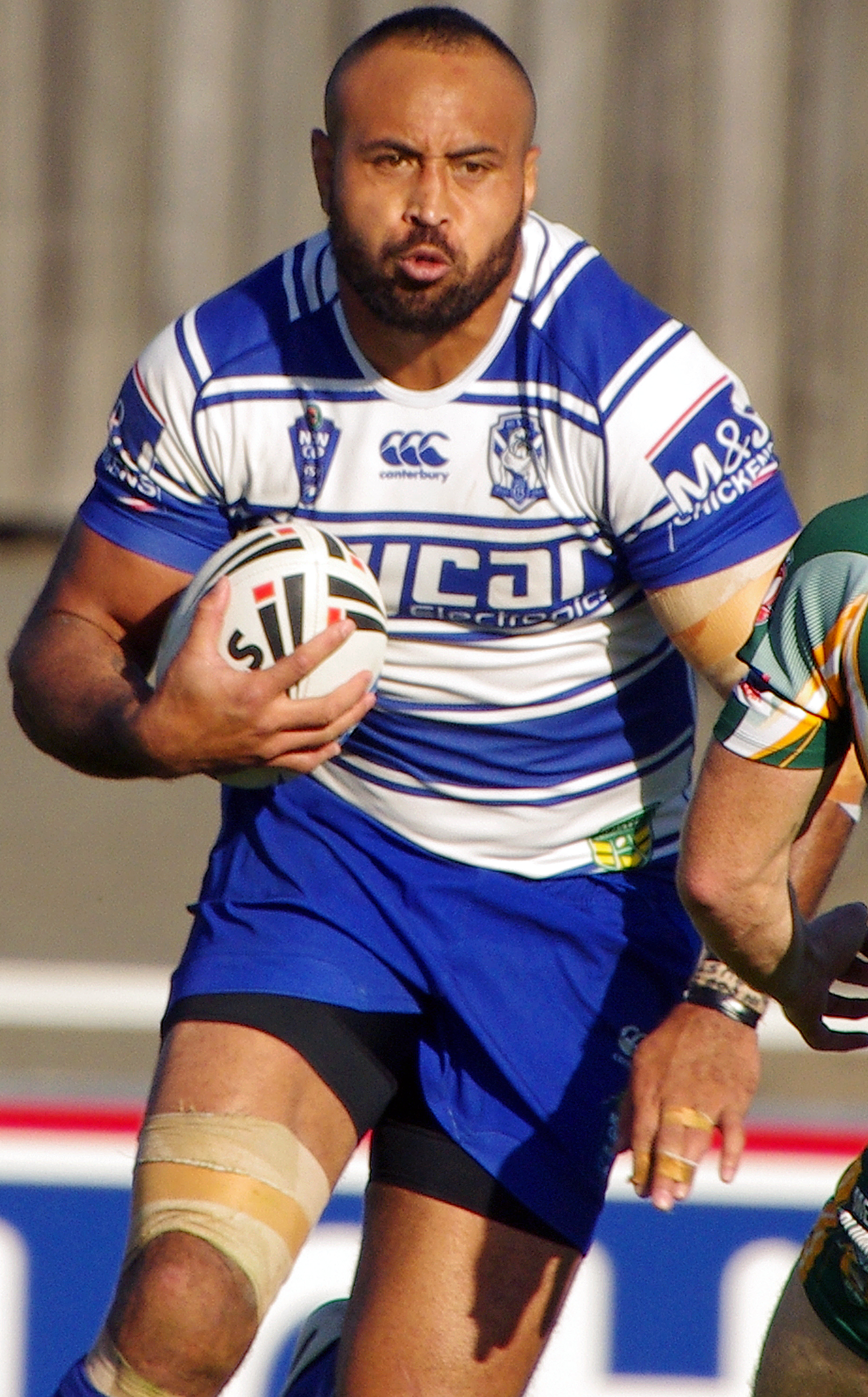

Personal information
- Born: 27 November 1984 (age 41) Matahau, Tonga

Playing information
- Height: 190 cm (6 ft 3 in)
- Weight: 112 kg (17 st 9 lb)
- Position: Prop, Second-row
Club
Years	Team	Pld	T	G	FG	P
2003–08	Melbourne Storm	78	6	0	0	24
2009–10	North Qld Cowboys	33	2	0	0	8
2010–11	Newcastle Knights	33	2	0	0	8
2012–13	London Broncos	56	8	0	0	32
2014	Huddersfield Giants	17	1	0	0	4
2014(loan)	→ Bradford Bulls	4	0	0	0	0
2015	Canterbury Bulldogs	7	0	0	0	0
	Total	228	19	0	0	76
Representative
Years	Team	Pld	T	G	FG	P
2006	Australia	1	0	0	0	0
2007	Queensland	1	0	0	0	0
2008	Tonga	4	0	0	0	0
2012	Exiles	2	0	0	0	0
- Education: St Joseph's College, Nudgee
- Relatives: Felise Kaufusi (brother); Patrick Kaufusi (brother)

Antonio Kaufusi (born 27 November 1984) is a former professional rugby league footballer. An Australia and Tonga international and Queensland State of Origin representative prop, he played for the Canterbury-Bankstown Bulldogs, Melbourne Storm, North Queensland Cowboys and the Newcastle Knights in the NRL, and the London Broncos, Huddersfield Giants and the Bradford Bulls in the Super League.

== Background ==
Kaufusi was born in Matahau, Tonga. His junior club was Brothers in Bundaberg and he played rugby union for Nudgee College in Brisbane in 2002.

== Playing career ==
=== Melbourne Storm ===
Kaufusi made his first-grade début in round 22 against the Bulldogs on 10 August 2003.

In 2006 Kaufusi was called up to the Australian tri-nations squad after Reni Maitua received an ankle injury in the first test against New Zealand. He played at prop forward in his first Grand Final in 2006, when the Storm were defeated by the Brisbane Broncos, 15–8.

He played State of Origin for Queensland, making his début in game one 2007.

A serious knee injury prevented Kaufusi from participating in the Storm's victorious 2007 premiership winning team. He played in the 2008 NRL Grand Final defeat by Manly. He played his first test for Tonga against the Kiwis starting in the front row in a World Cup warm up match.

He was named in the Tonga squad for the 2008 Rugby League World Cup.

=== Cowboys ===
In 2009, the North Queensland Cowboys signed Kaufusi on a large contract. His stint with the Cowboys was short though, being released a year later.

=== Knights ===
On 25 June 2010, Kaufusi was released from his contract with the North Queensland Cowboys to join the Newcastle Knights for the rest of 2010 and a further two years. He made a winning début for the Knights in round 18 against the Cronulla-Sutherland Sharks.

=== London Broncos ===
On 18 August 2011, Kaufusi signed a 3-year deal with the London Broncos in the Super League after the 2012 Knights coach, Wayne Bennett, released him from his contract a year early.

=== Huddersfield Giants ===
Kaufusi played for Huddersfield Giants in 2014.

=== Bradford Bulls ===
On 2 May 2014, Kaufusi was loaned to Bradford Bulls for the rest of the 2014 season.

=== Canterbury-Bankstown Bulldogs ===
On 13 November 2014, Kaufusi signed a 2-year contract with the Canterbury-Bankstown Bulldogs starting in 2015, to return to Australia.
