= 2007 Anzac Test =

Australia	New Zealand
30	6
	1	2	Total
AUS	6	24	30
NZL	0	6	6
- Date: 20 April 2007
- Stadium: Suncorp Stadium
- Location: Brisbane, Queensland, Australia
- Referee: Steve Ganson (England)
- Attendance: 35,241

Broadcast partners
- Broadcasters: Nine Network (AUS) Sky Sport (NZ)
- Commentators: Ray Warren; Phil Gould; Peter Sterling

The 2007 ANZAC test was a rugby league test match played between Australia and New Zealand at the Suncorp Stadium in Brisbane on 20 April 2007. It was the 8th Anzac test played between the two nations since the first was played under the Super League banner in 1997 and the third to be played in Brisbane.

== Squads ==
Australia	Position	New Zealand
Karmichael Hunt	Fullback	Krisnan Inu
Matt King	Wing	Jake Webster
Jamie Lyon	Centre	Iosia Soliola
Justin Hodges	Centre	Simon Mannering
Brent Tate	Wing	Manu Vatuvei
Darren Lockyer (c)	Five-Eighth	Benji Marshall
Johnathan Thurston	Halfback	Ben Roberts
Brent Kite	Prop	Nathan Cayless
Cameron Smith	Hooker	Dene Halatau
Petero Civoniceva	Prop	Roy Asotasi (c)
Nathan Hindmarsh	2nd Row	Sonny Bill Williams
Willie Mason	2nd Row	Tony Puletua
Andrew Ryan	Lock	David Fa'alogo
Luke Bailey	Interchange	David Faiumu
Shaun Berrigan	Interchange	Sam Rapira
Steve Simpson	Interchange	Greg Eastwood
Anthony Tupou	Interchange	Frank Pritchard
Ricky Stuart	Coach	Brian McClennan

== Match Summary ==
20 April 2007

Australia	30 – 6	New Zealand
Tries: Nathan Hindmarsh; Karmichael Hunt; Matt King; Darren Lockyer; Brent Tate; Goals: Johnathan Thurston (5/6)		Tries: Manu Vatuvei Goals: Benji Marshall (1/1)

Suncorp Stadium, Brisbane
Attendance: 35,241
Referee: Steve Ganson (England)
