= 2019 Dally M Awards =

Official annual awards of the National Rugby League

- Date: 2 October
- Location: Hordern Pavilion
- Dally M Medal: James Tedesco

Television/radio coverage
- Network: Fox League

The 2019 Dally M Awards were presented on Wednesday 2 October 2019. They are the official annual awards of the National Rugby League and are named after Dally Messenger.

== Dally M Medal ==
Dally M Player of the Year: James Tedesco

Player votes tally – Top 10
Points	Player
34	James Tedesco
31	Cameron Smith
29	Mitchell Moses
27	Payne Haas
22	Cameron Munster
22	Roger Tuivasa-Sheck
21	Damien Cook
19	Cameron Murray
19	Jason Taumalolo
18	Mitchell Pearce
18	Luke Keary
18	Charnze Nicoll-Klokstad

== Dally M Awards ==
The Dally M Awards are, as usual, conducted at the close of the regular season and hence do not take games played in the finals series into account. The Dally M Medal is for the official player of the year, while in a change from previous seasons, the Provan-Summons Medal was awarded to Canterbury-Bankstown Bulldogs skipper Josh Jackson for the sportsmanship he showed in consoling Wests Tigers goalkicker Paul Momirovski after he missed a goal to force golden point against the Bulldogs in round 21.

Award	Player
Provan-Summons Medal (Spirit of the Game)	Josh Jackson
Award for Rookie of the Year	Payne Haas
Captain of the Year	Cameron Smith
Coach of the Year	Craig Bellamy
Top Tryscorer of the Year (Ken Irvine Medal)	Maika Sivo
Top Pointscorer of the Year	Latrell Mitchell
Peter Frilingos Memorial Award for Headline Moment of the Year	James Tedesco's State of Origin series winning try.
Female Player of the Year	Jessica Sergis

Team of the Year

Award	Player
Best Fullback	James Tedesco
Best Winger	Ken Maumalo
Best Centre	Latrell Mitchell
Best Five-Eighth	Cameron Munster
Best Halfback	Mitchell Moses
Best Lock	Cameron Murray
Best Second-Rower	John Bateman
Best Prop	Payne Haas
Best Hooker	Cameron Smith
Best Interchange Player	Brandon Smith

== Judging Panel ==
- Greg Alexander (Fox League)
- Braith Anasta (Fox League)
- Gary Belcher (Fox League)
- Danny Buderus (Fox League)
- Matt Elliott
- Michael Ennis (Fox League)
- Brett Finch (Fox League)
- Mark Geyer (Triple M)
- Ryan Girdler (Triple M)
- Dene Halatau (ABC)
- Justin Hodges (Fox League)
- Andrew Johns (Nine)
- Dallas Johnson
- Brett Kimmorley (Fox League)
- Wally Lewis (Nine)
- Darren Lockyer (Nine)
- Billy Moore (Fox League)
- Corey Parker (Fox League)
- Steve Roach (Fox League)
- Andrew Ryan (ABC)
- Jimmy Smith
- Alan Tongue (ABC)

== See also ==
- Dally M Awards
- Dally M Medal
- 2019 NRL season
