= 2017 Dally M Awards =

Australian rugby league awards

- Date: 27 September
- Location: The Star Sydney
- Hosted by: Yvonne Sampson; Lara Pitt; Hannah Hollis; Jessica Yates
- Dally M Medal: Cameron Smith

Television/radio coverage
- Network: Fox League

The 2017 Dally M Awards was presented on Wednesday 27 September 2017. They are the official annual awards of the National Rugby League and are named after Dally Messenger.

== Dally M Medal ==
Dally M Player of the Year: Cameron Smith

Player votes tally – Top 10
Points	Player
33	Cameron Smith
25	Michael Morgan
24	Gareth Widdop
22	Luke Keary
22	Paul Gallen
21	Daly Cherry-Evans
20	Billy Slater
19	Jason Taumalolo †
19	Corey Norman
18	James Tedesco

† Taumalolo was given a 6 point penalty for being suspended for two games.

== Dally M Awards ==
The Dally M Awards are, as usual, conducted at the close of the regular season and hence do not take games played in the finals series into account. The Dally M Medal is for the official player of the year while the Provan-Summons Medal is for the fans' of "people's choice" player of the year.

Award	Player
Provan-Summons Medal	Clint Gutherson
Peter Moore Award for Rookie of the Year	Nick Cotric
Captain of the Year	Cameron Smith
Representative Player of the Year	
Coach of the Year	Craig Bellamy
Top Tryscorer of the Year	Suliasi Vunivalu – 23
Top Pointscorer of the Year	Nathan Cleary – 216
Peter Frilingos Memorial Award for Headline Moment of the Year	Mitchell Pearce
Holden Cup Player of the Year	Jake Clifford
Female Player of the Year	Simaima Taufa

Team of the Year

Award	Player
Best Fullback	Billy Slater
Best Winger	Jordan Rapana
Best Centre	Dylan Walker
Best Five-Eighth	Gareth Widdop
Best Halfback	Michael Morgan
Best Lock	Paul Gallen
Best Second-Rower	Matt Gillett
Best Prop	Aaron Woods
Best Hooker	Cameron Smith
Best Interchange Player	Reagan Campbell-Gillard

== Presenters ==
Hosts

- Yvonne Sampson, Lara Pitt, Hannah Hollis and Jessica Yates

Top Try and Point Scorer

- Jarrod Croker

Rookie Award

- Michael Ennis

Peter Frilingo Medal

- Phil Rothfield

Captain of the Year

- Mal Meninga

Countdown

- Johnathan Thurston

Team of the Year

- Mal Meninga

== Judging Panel ==
- Greg Alexander (Fox League)
- Braith Anasta (Fox League)
- Richie Barnett (Sky Sport)
- Gary Belcher (Fox League)
- Monty Betham (Sky Sport)
- Darryl Brohman
- Danny Buderus (Fox League)
- Brett Finch (Fox League)
- Joe Galuvao
- Mark Gasnier (Fox League)
- Ryan Girdler (Triple M)
- Daryl Halligan (Sky Sports)
- Andrew Johns (Nine)
- Dallas Johnson
- Brett Kimmorley (Fox League)
- Darren Lockyer (Nine)
- Steve Menzies
- Steve Roach (Fox League)
- Andrew Ryan
- Jimmy Smith
- Peter Sterling (Nine)
- Alan Tongue
- Kevin Walters (Fox League)

== See also ==
- Dally M Awards
- Dally M Medal
- 2017 NRL season
