= 2024 Dally M Awards =

National Rugby League Awards

- Date: 2 October 2024
- Location: Randwick Racecourse, Sydney
- Hosted by: Cooper Cronk & Yvonne Sampson
- Dally M Medal: Jahrome Hughes; Olivia Kernick

Television/radio coverage
- Network: Fox League

The 2024 Dally M Awards was presented on 2 October 2024. They are the official annual awards of the National Rugby League and are named after Dally Messenger.

The voting process remained unchanged from the previous season; two judges each award six points per regular season match, split between three players with the best player receiving three points. The maximum votes a player could receive per match is six. Players given a one-game suspension received a six-point deduction, while players suspended for two or more games remained ineligible to receive any awards.

== Dally M Medal ==
Dally M Player of the Year (Men):

Player votes tally – Top 10
Points	Player (Men)
62	Jahrome Hughes
61	James Tedesco
51	Daly Cherry-Evans
46	Tom Trbojevic
45	Scott Drinkwater
42	Isaah Yeo
40	Kalyn Ponga
34	Dylan Edwards
33	Ben Hunt
33	Harry Grant

Dally M Player of the Year (Women):

Player votes tally – Top 10
Points	Player (Women)
22	Olivia Kernick
20	Abbi Church
20	Lauren Brown
19	Tamika Upton
17	Julia Robinson
17	Simaima Taufa
17	Yasmin Clydsdale
16	Alexis Tauaneai
14	Tarryn Aiken
14	Tiana Penitani

== Dally M Awards ==
The Dally M Awards were, as usual, conducted at the close of the regular season and hence did not take games played in the finals series into account.

Award	Player
Provan-Summons Medal (Spirit of the Game)(Mens)	Tyrone Munro
Rookie of the Year	Jack Bostock
Captain of the Year	Stephen Crichton
Coach of the Year	Craig Bellamy
Top Tryscorer of the Year (Ken Irvine Medal)	Alofiana Khan-Pereira
Top Pointscorer of the Year	Valentine Holmes
VB Hard Earned Player of the Year Award	Isaah Yeo
Ken Stephen Medal	Nicho Hynes
Drinkwise Try of the Year	Xavier Coates
Youi Tackle of the Year	Tom Dearden
Peter Frilingos Headline Moment of the Year	Xavier Coates
Provan-Summons Medal (Spirit of the Game)(Women's)	Georgia Hale & Zahara Temara
NRLW Rookie of the year	Kasey Reh
NRLW Captain of the Year	Tiana Penitani
NRLW Coach of the Year	Scott Prince
NRLW Top Tryscorer of the Year	Julia Robinson
NRLW Top Tryscorer of the Year	Sheridan Gallagher
NRLW Top Pointscorer of the Year	Romy Teitzel
NRLW Try of the Year	Zali Fay
NRLW Tackle of the Year	Abigail Roache
Veronica White Medal	Kimberley Hunt

Team of the Year

Award	Player
Best Fullback	James Tedesco
Best Wingers	Brian To'o
Best Wingers	Zac Lomax
Best Centres	Herbie Farnworth
Best Centres	Stephen Crichton
Best Five-Eighth	Tom Dearden
Best Halfback	Jahrome Hughes
Best Hooker	Harry Grant
Best Props	Addin Fonua-Blake
Best Props	Joe Tapine
Best Second-Rowers	Angus Crichton
Best Second-Rowers	Eliesa Katoa
Best Lock	Isaah Yeo

Women's Team of the Year

Award	Player
Best Fullback	Abbi Church
Best Wingers	Julia Robinson
Best Wingers	Stacey Waaka
Best Centres	Isabelle Kelly
Best Centres	Tiana Penitani
Best Five-Eighth	Zahara Temara
Best Halfback	Lauren Brown
Best Hooker	Keeley Davis
Best Props	Millie Elliott
Best Props	Shannon Mato
Best Second-Rowers	Olivia Kernick
Best Second-Rowers	Yasmin Clydsdale
Best Lock	Simaima Taufa

== See also ==
- Dally M Awards
- Dally M Medal
- 2024 NRL season
