= 2020 Dally M Awards =

Rugby league awards

- Date: 19 October
- Location: Sydney
- Dally M Medal: Jack Wighton

Television/radio coverage
- Network: Fox League

The 2020 Dally M Awards were presented on Monday 19 October 2020. They are the official annual awards of the National Rugby League and are named after Dally Messenger.

== Dally M Medal ==
Dally M Player of the Year: Jack Wighton

Player votes tally – Top 10
| Points | Player |
|---|---|
| 26 | Jack Wighton |
| 25 | Clint Gutherson |
| 24 | Nathan Cleary |
| 22 | Cameron Smith |
| 18 | Luke Keary |
| 18 | Shaun Johnson |
| 17 | Jarome Luai |
| 17 | Adam Reynolds |
| 16 | Ryan Papenhuyzen |
| 16 | Kalyn Ponga |

== Dally M Awards ==
The Dally M Awards are, as usual, conducted at the close of the regular season and hence do not take games played in the finals series into account. The Dally M Medal is for the official player of the year, while the Provan-Summons Medal was awarded to the New Zealand Warriors for the sacrifices the club made in relocating to Australia to keep the season alive due to the COVID-19 pandemic.

| Award | Player |
|---|---|
| Provan-Summons Medal (Spirit of the Game) | New Zealand Warriors |
| NRL Rookie of the Year | Harry Grant |
| Captain of the Year | Roger Tuivasa-Sheck |
| Coach of the Year | Ivan Cleary |
| Top Tryscorer of the Year (Ken Irvine Medal) | Alex Johnston (20 Tries) |
| Top Pointscorer of the Year | Adam Reynolds (191 Points) |
| VB Hard Earned Player of the Year Award | Jake Trbojevic & Tohu Harris |
| Peter Frilingos Memorial Award for Headline Moment of the Year | "Project Apollo", the NRL's restart project, succeeding |
| Ken Stephen Medal (Note: Awarded at 2020 NRL Grand Final.) | Connor Watson |
| Drinkwise Try of the Year | Kotoni Staggs vs. St. George Illawarra Dragons, Round 15 |
| Youi Tackle of the Year | Josh Papalii on Jamal Fogarty vs. Gold Coast Titans, Round 15 |
| Female Player of the Year | Ali Brigginshaw |
| Rebel NRLW Rookie of the Year | Kennedy Cherrington |
| NRLW Try of the Year | Madison Bartlett |
| NRLW Tackle of the Year | Hannah Southwell |

Team of the Year

| Award | Player |
|---|---|
| Best Fullback | Clint Gutherson |
| Best Wingers | David Nofoaluma |
| Best Wingers | Josh Addo-Carr |
| Best Centres | Kotoni Staggs |
| Best Centres | Stephen Crichton |
| Best Five-Eighth | Jack Wighton |
| Best Halfback | Nathan Cleary |
| Best Lock | Isaah Yeo |
| Best Second-Rowers | Viliame Kikau |
| Best Second-Rowers | Tohu Harris |
| Best Props | Josh Papalii |
| Best Props | James Fisher-Harris |
| Best Hooker | Cameron Smith |

== Judging panel ==
- Brett Kimmorley
- Jimmy Smith
- Darren Lockyer
- Greg Alexander
- Corey Parker
- Andrew Ryan
- Andrew Johns
- Steve Roach
- Johnathan Thurston
- Dene Halatau
- Billy Moore
- Gary Belcher
- Ben Ikin
- L. Lewis
- Matt Elliott
- Justin Hodges
- Scott Sattler
- Sam Thaiday
- Nathan Hindmarsh
- Anthony Minichiello
- Ryan Girdler
- Steve Menzies
- Mark Geyer
- Petero Civoniceva
- Dallas Johnson
- Ben Galea
- Alan Tongue
- Tony Puletua
- Wally Lewis
- Paul Whatuira

== See also ==
- Dally M Awards
- Dally M Medal
- 2020 NRL season
