= 2006 Dally M Awards =

- Date: 5 September
- Location: Sydney Town Hall
- Dally M Medal: Cameron Smith

Television/radio coverage
- Network: Fox Sports

The 2006 Dally M Awards were presented on Tuesday 5 September 2006 at the Sydney Town Hall in Sydney and broadcast on Fox Sports. Warren Smith presided as Master of Ceremonies, a role which he had held in previous years.

== Dally M Player of the Year ==
Presented by prime minister John Howard
Dally M Player of the Year
Winner:

Cameron Smith, Melbourne Storm

=== Player votes tally (top 10) ===
Player	Points	Club
Cameron Smith	34	Melbourne Storm
Nathan Hindmarsh	30	Parramatta Eels
Ben Kennedy	25	Manly Sea Eagles
Danny Buderus	23	Newcastle Knights
Matt Orford	20	Manly Sea Eagles
Johnathan Thurston	20	North Queensland Cowboys
Clinton Schifcofske	19	Canberra Raiders
Darren Lockyer	18	Brisbane Broncos
Brent Webb	18	New Zealand Warriors
Petero Civoniceva	18	Brisbane Broncos

== Special awards ==
Provan-Summons Medal (fan's choice for 2005's best player)
Presented by Norm Provan and Arthur Summons

Winner:

Nathan Hindmarsh, Parramatta Eels

Nominated:

Ben Kennedy, Manly Warringah Sea Eagles
Willie Mason, Canterbury Bulldogs
Andrew Johns, Newcastle Knights

Peter Moore Award for Dally M Rookie of the Year

Winner:

Jarryd Hayne, Parramatta Eels

Nominated:

Greg Eastwood, Brisbane Broncos
Darius Boyd, Brisbane Broncos
Luke Douglas, Cronulla-Sutherland Sharks

Dally M Captain of the Year

Winner:

Ben Kennedy, Manly Warringah Sea Eagles

Nominated:

Darren Lockyer, Brisbane Broncos
Cameron Smith, Melbourne Storm
Andrew Ryan, Canterbury Bulldogs

Dally M Representative Player of the Year

Winner:

Darren Lockyer, Queensland & Australia

Nominated:

Petero Civoniceva, Queensland & Australia
Johnathan Thurston, Queensland & Australia
Willie Mason, New South Wales & Australia

Dally M Coach of the Year

Winner:

Craig Bellamy, Melbourne Storm

Nominated:

Steve Folkes, Canterbury Bulldogs
Jason Taylor, Parramatta Eels
Matthew Elliott, Canberra Raiders

Peter Frilingos Memorial Award for the Headline Moment of the Year
Presented by David Penberthy, Editor of The Daily Telegraph

Winner:

Brett Finch's winning field goal, State of Origin Game I

Nominated:

Brett Stewart try against Wests Tigers
Queensland's State of Origin III comeback
St George Illawarra Dragons last minute victory over the Brisbane Broncos

Top Try Scorer
Winners:

Nathan Merritt, South Sydney Rabbitohs - 22 tries

Top Point Scorer
Winner:

Hazem El Masri, Canterbury Bulldogs - 296 points

== Team of the Year ==
Best Fullback
Winner:

Clinton Schifcofske, Canberra Raiders

Nominated:

Greg Inglis, Melbourne Storm
Rhys Wesser, Penrith Panthers
Brett Stewart, Manly Warringah Sea Eagles

Best Winger
Winner:

Brian Carney, Newcastle Knights

Nominated:

Hazem El Masri, Canterbury Bulldogs
Eric Grothe, Parramatta Eels
Nathan Merritt, South Sydney Rabbitohs

Best Centre
Winner:

Mark Gasnier, St George Illawarra Dragons

Nominated:

Justin Hodges, Brisbane Broncos
Adam Mogg, Canberra Raiders
Matt Cooper, St George Illawarra Dragons
Jake Webster, Melbourne Storm

Best Five-Eighth
Winner:

Darren Lockyer, Brisbane Broncos

Nominated:

Scott Hill, Melbourne Storm
Jason Smith, Canberra Raiders
Preston Campbell, Penrith Panthers

Best Halfback
Winner:

Cooper Cronk, Melbourne Storm

Nominated:

Matt Orford, Manly Warringah Sea Eagles
Andrew Johns, Newcastle Knights
Johnathan Thurston, North Queensland Cowboys

Best Lock
Winner:

Ben Kennedy, Manly Warringah Sea Eagles

Nominated:

Alan Tongue, Canberra Raiders
Reni Maitua, Canterbury Bulldogs
Dallas Johnson, Melbourne Storm

Best Second Rower
Winner:

Nathan Hindmarsh, Parramatta Eels

Nominated:

Willie Mason, Canterbury Bulldogs
Steve Simpson, Newcastle Knights
Ryan Hoffman, Melbourne Storm

Best Prop
Winner:

Roy Asotasi, Canterbury Bulldogs

Nominated:

Luke Bailey, St George Illawarra Dragons
Petero Civoniceva, Brisbane Broncos
Mark O'Meley, Canterbury Bulldogs

Best Hooker
Winner:

Cameron Smith, Melbourne Storm

== Hall of Fame Inductees ==
- Ken Kearney
- Sid Pearce
- Charles Fraser
- George Treweek
- Duncan Hall
- Peter Sterling

== See also ==
- Dally M Awards
- Dally M Medal
- National Rugby League season 2006
