= 2008 Dally M Awards =

Australian rugby league award show

- Date: 9 September
- Location: Hordern Pavilion
- Dally M Medal: Matt Orford

Television/radio coverage
- Network: Fox Sports

The 2008 Dally M Awards were presented on Tuesday 9 September 2008 at the Hordern Pavilion in Sydney and broadcast on Fox Sports.

== Dally M Medal ==
Dally M Player of the Year: Matt Orford

Player votes tally – Top 10

Points	Player
24	Matt Orford
22	Billy Slater
22	Cameron Smith
21	Brett Kimmorley
21	Danny Buderus
21	Terry Campese
20	Braith Anasta
18	Kurt Gidley
18	Nathan Hindmarsh
18	Sam Thaiday

== Dally M Awards ==
The Dally M Awards were, as usual, conducted at the close of the regular season and hence do not take games played in the finals series into account. Billy Slater would have won the award had it not been for a one-week suspension for an on-field fight that occurred late in the season which deducted three votes from his tally. Some experts called for a change in the rules claiming he deserved the award for being the best player that season despite the suspension but this never eventuated.

Award	Player	Club
Provan-Summons Medal	Nathan Hindmarsh	Parramatta Eels
Rookie of the Year	Chris Sandow	South Sydney Rabbitohs
Captain of the Year	Alan Tongue	Canberra Raiders
Rep Player of the Year	Greg Inglis	Melbourne Storm
Coach of the Year	Neil Henry	Canberra Raiders
Top Tryscorer of the Year	Brett Stewart	Manly Sea Eagles (22)
Top Pointscorer of the Year	Luke Covell	Cronulla-Sutherland Sharks (206)
Toyota Cup Player of the Year	Ben Hunt	Brisbane Broncos

Team of the Year

Award	Player	Club
Best Fullback	Billy Slater	Melbourne Storm
Best Winger	Colin Best	Canberra Raiders
Best Centre	Israel Folau	Melbourne Storm
Best Five-Eighth	Greg Inglis	Melbourne Storm
Best Halfback	Matt Orford	Manly Sea Eagles
Best Lock	Alan Tongue	Canberra Raiders
Best Second-Rower	Glenn Stewart	Manly Sea Eagles
Best Prop	Petero Civoniceva	Penrith Panthers
Best Hooker	Cameron Smith	Melbourne Storm

== See also ==
- Dally M Awards
- Dally M Medal
- National Rugby League season 2008
