= 2021 Dally M Awards =

National Rugby League Awards Queensland

- Date: 20 & 27 September
- Location: Howard Smith Wharves, Brisbane
- Dally M Medal: Tom Trbojevic

Television/radio coverage
- Network: Fox League

The 2021 Dally M Awards were presented over two nights at the Howard Smith Wharves in Brisbane on the 20 and 27 September 2021. The first night highlighted the minor awards featured in the Dally M Awards as well as building anticipation for the second night which presented the major awards and the Dally M Medal. They are the official annual awards of the National Rugby League and are named after Dally Messenger.

== Dally M Medal ==
Dally M Player of the Year: Tom Trbojevic

Player votes tally – Top 10
Points	Player
35	Tom Trbojevic
30	Nathan Cleary
26	Cody Walker*
23	James Tedesco
23	Daly Cherry-Evans
21	Roger Tuivasa-Sheck
20	Jahrome Hughes
20	Adam Doueihi
20	William Kennedy Jr.
18	Ben Hunt

- Cody Walker was deducted 3 votes for being suspended in Round 5.

== Dally M Awards ==
The Dally M Awards are, as usual, conducted at the close of the regular season and hence do not take games played in the finals series into account.

Award	Player
Provan-Summons Medal (Spirit of the Game)	Josh Morris
Rookie of the Year	Sam Walker
Captain of the Year	James Tedesco
Coach of the Year	Craig Bellamy
Top Tryscorer of the Year (Ken Irvine Medal)	Alex Johnston (27 Tries)
Top Pointscorer of the Year	Reuben Garrick (304 Points)
VB Hard Earned Player of the Year Award	Isaiah Papali'i
Peter Frilingos Memorial Award for Headline Moment of the Year	Melbourne Storm winning 19 matches in a row
Ken Stephen Medal (Note: Award announced at 2021 NRL Grand Final.)	Ronaldo Mulitalo
Therabody Young Gun of the Year	Nicho Hynes
Drinkwise Try of the Year	Tom Trbojevic vs. North Queensland Cowboys, Round 25
Youi Tackle of the Year	Xavier Coates on Dane Gagai vs. South Sydney Rabbitohs, Round 15
NRLW 2021 Season Awards, presented on 7 April 2022
Female Player of the Year	Millie Boyle and Emma Tonegato
NRLW Coach of the Year	Jamie Soward
NRLW Captain of the Year	Brittany Breayley-Nati
NRLW Try of the Year	Shaniah Power vs. Brisbane Broncos, Round 4 (19 March 2022).
NRLW Tackle of the Year	Emma Tonegato on Jessica Sergis vs. Sydney Roosters, Round 5 (26 March 2022).

Team of the Year

Award	Player
Best Fullback	Tom Trbojevic
Best Wingers	Reuben Garrick
Best Wingers	Brian To'o
Best Centres	Justin Olam
Best Centres	Matt Burton
Best Five-Eighth	Cody Walker
Best Halfback	Nathan Cleary
Best Lock	Isaah Yeo
Best Second-Rowers	Viliame Kikau
Best Second-Rowers	Isaiah Papali'i
Best Props	James Fisher-Harris
Best Props	Payne Haas
Best Hooker	Brandon Smith

== See also ==
- Dally M Awards
- Dally M Medal
- 2021 NRL season
