= 2004 Dally M Awards =

- Date: 7 September
- Location: Sydney Town Hall
- Dally M Medal: Danny Buderus

Television/radio coverage
- Network: Fox Sports

The 2004 Dally M Awards were presented on Tuesday 7 September 2004 at the Sydney Town Hall in Sydney and broadcast on Fox Sports. Warren Smith presided as Master of Ceremonies.

== Dally M Player of the Year ==
Dally M Player of the Year: Danny Buderus

Player votes tally – Top 10
Points	Player
27	Danny Buderus
25	Brett Finch
23	Craig Gower
23	Matt Orford
21	Nathan Hindmarsh
19	Paul Rauhihi
16	Brett Kimmorley
16	Darren Lockyer
15	Michael Monaghan
15	Scott Prince
15	Andrew Ryan
14	Mark O'Meley
14	Steve Price
14	Shane Webcke

== Dally M Awards ==
The Dally M Awards were, as usual, conducted at the close of the regular season and hence do not take games played in the finals series into account. The Dally M Medal is for the official player of the year while the Provan-Summons Medal is for the fans' of "people's choice" player of the year.

Award	Player
Provan-Summons Medal	Darren Lockyer
Rookie of the Year	Karmichael Hunt
Captain of the Year	Steve Price
Representative Player of the Year	Craig Fitzgibbon
Coach of the Year	Steve Folkes
Top Tryscorer of the Year	Amos Roberts 23 tries
Top Pointscorer of the Year	Hazem El Masri – 288
Peter Frilingos Memorial Award	Billy Slater – Try in Game II of the 2004 State of Origin series

Team of the Year

Award	Player
Best Fullback	Anthony Minichiello
Best Winger	Amos Roberts
Best Centre	Willie Tonga
Best Five-Eighth	Darren Lockyer
Best Halfback	Brett Finch
Best Lock	Shaun Timmins
Best Second-Rower	Nathan Hindmarsh
Best Prop	Paul Rauhihi
Best Hooker	Danny Buderus

== Hall of Fame Inductees ==
Pre-WWII

- Frank Burge (Glebe, St George; lock/second-row from 1911–27)
- Harold Horder (Souths, Norths; winger from 1912–1924)
- Vic Hey (Wests, Ipswich, Leeds, Dewsbury, Hunslet, Parramatta; five-eighth from 1933–49)

Post-WWII

- Harry Bath (Balmain, Barrow, Warrington, St George; second row from 1946–59)
- Norm Provan (St George; second row from 1951–1965)
- Ken Irvine (Norths, Manly; winger from 1958–1973)

== See also ==
- Dally M Awards
- Dally M Medal
- 2004 NRL season
