= Herbie Farnworth =

England international rugby league footballer

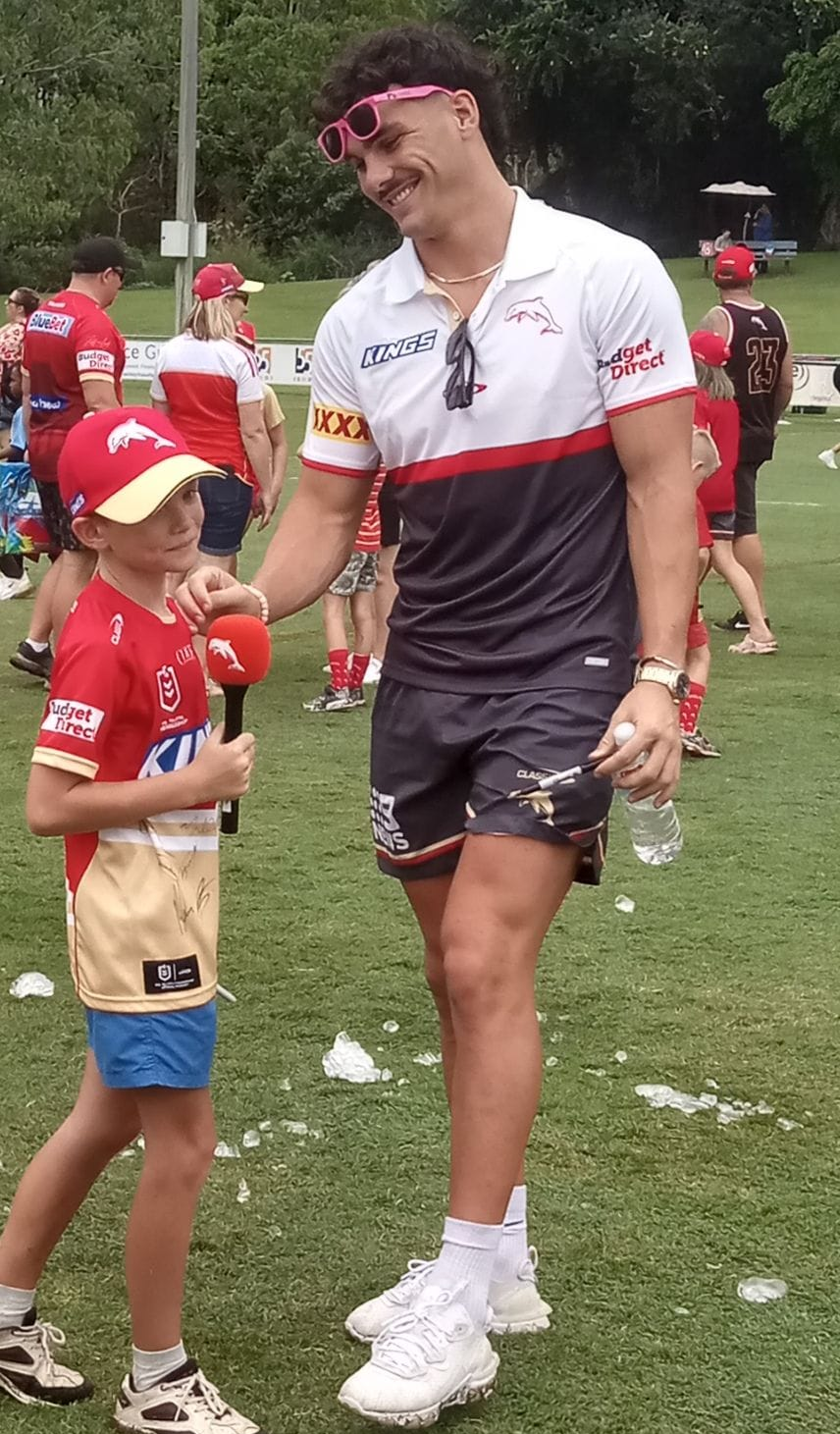

Personal information
- Full name: Herbert John Felix Farnworth
- Born: 23 December 1999 (age 26) Burnley, Lancashire, England
- Height: 190 cm (6 ft 3 in)
- Weight: 106 kg (16 st 10 lb)

Playing information
- Position: Centre
Club
Years	Team	Pld	T	G	FG	P
2019–23	Brisbane Broncos	79	34	14	0	164
2024–	Dolphins	64	35	0	0	140
	Total	143	69	14	0	304
Representative
Years	Team	Pld	T	G	FG	P
2022–	England	12	9	0	0	36
- Source: As of 6 November 2026

Herbert John Felix Farnworth (born 23 December 1999) is an English professional rugby league footballer who plays as a centre for the Dolphins in the National Rugby League (NRL) in Australia, and England at international level.

Farnworth previously played for the Brisbane Broncos in the NRL. He was shortlisted for the Golden Boot award in 2024 and earned inclusion in consecutive Dally M Teams of the Year (2023 and 2024) and again in 2026.

== Background ==
Farnworth was born in Blacko, Lancashire, England. As a youth, he was a talented association football (soccer) player and part of the Manchester United development system before converting to rugby league. He also grew up playing rugby union.

As a schoolboy at Ermysted's Grammar School, Brisbane Broncos scouts spotted Farnworth playing for Wigan St Patricks and Newton Storm, so he moved to Australia after leaving school. As a junior, Farnworth played fullback.

== Club career ==
=== Brisbane Broncos (2017–2023) ===
==== Youth and reserve ====
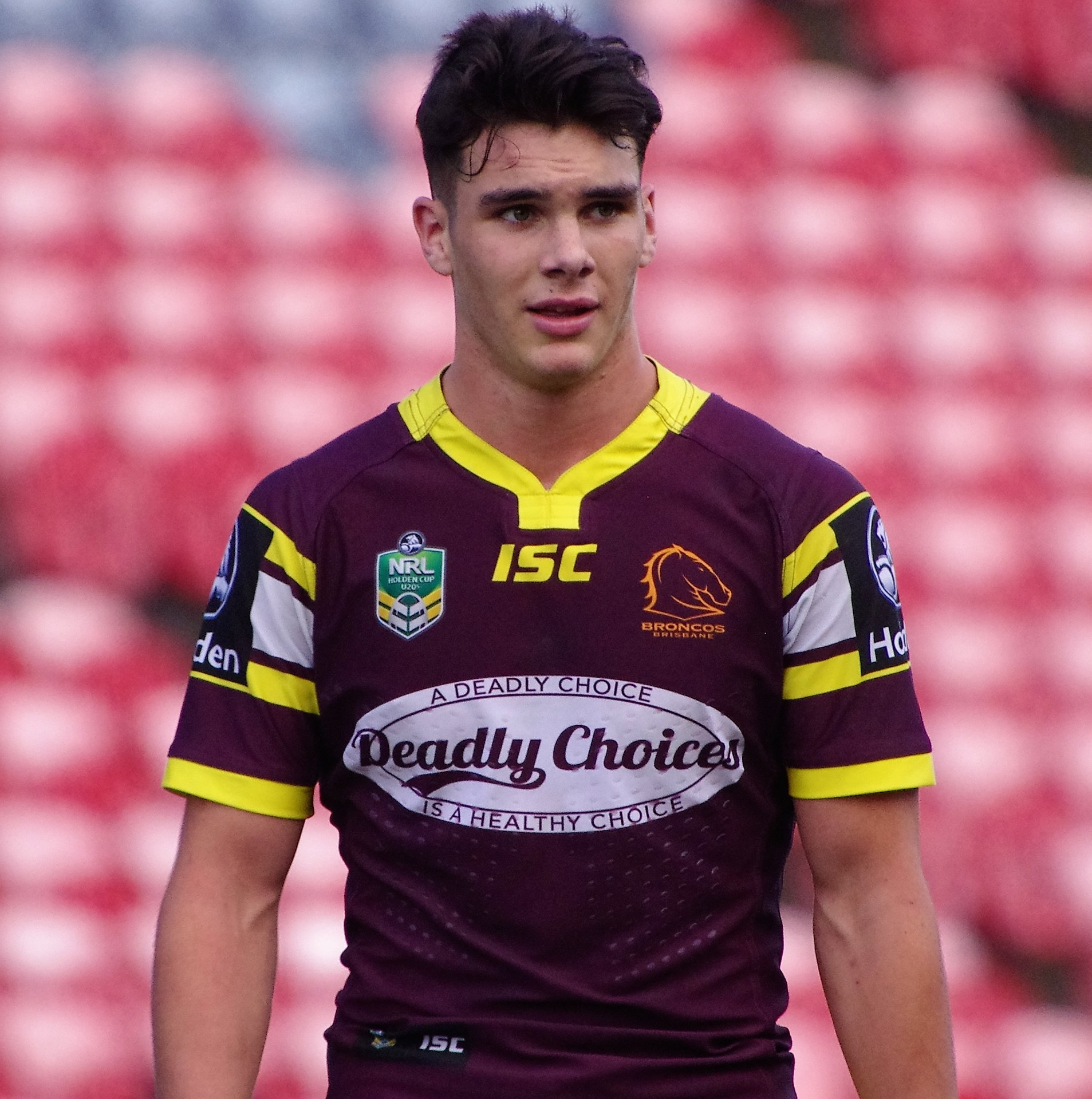
Farnworth in 2017

During the 2017 season, Farnworth played seventeen games and scored eight tries for the Brisbane Broncos in the NRL Under-20s, the last season of the competition. The following year in 2018, Farnworth was loaned to Norths Devils (an affiliated club of Brisbane) who play in the Queensland Cup. He played nine games, scoring four tries and kicking nine goals.

==== Senior team ====
Farnworth made his NRL debut in Round 16 of the 2019 season for Brisbane against the Cronulla-Sutherland Sharks. Farnworth finished with two NRL games played while he played for Broncos feeder club, Norths Devils ending the season as the team's top scorer and third overall in the Intrust Super Cup competition scoring 204 points (20 tries, 62 goals).

Farnworth played nineteen games and scored six tries for Brisbane in the 2020 NRL season as the club finished last on the table and claimed their first wooden spoon.

In Round 23 of the 2021 NRL season, Farnworth kicked four goals from four attempts, leading the Broncos to a 24-22 win over the New Zealand Warriors, ending their finals hopes.

In round 14 of the 2022 NRL season, Farnworth scored two tries for Brisbane in a 24-18 victory over Canberra but was taken from the field in the second half with a suspected bicep injury.

In the 2023 preliminary final, Farnworth scored two tries as Brisbane defeated the New Zealand Warriors 42-12 which saw the club qualify for their first grand final in eight years. Farnworth played twenty-six games for Brisbane in the 2023 NRL season and scored fifteen tries. He also played in Brisbane's 24-26 loss to Penrith in the 2023 NRL Grand Final.

=== Dolphins (2024–) ===
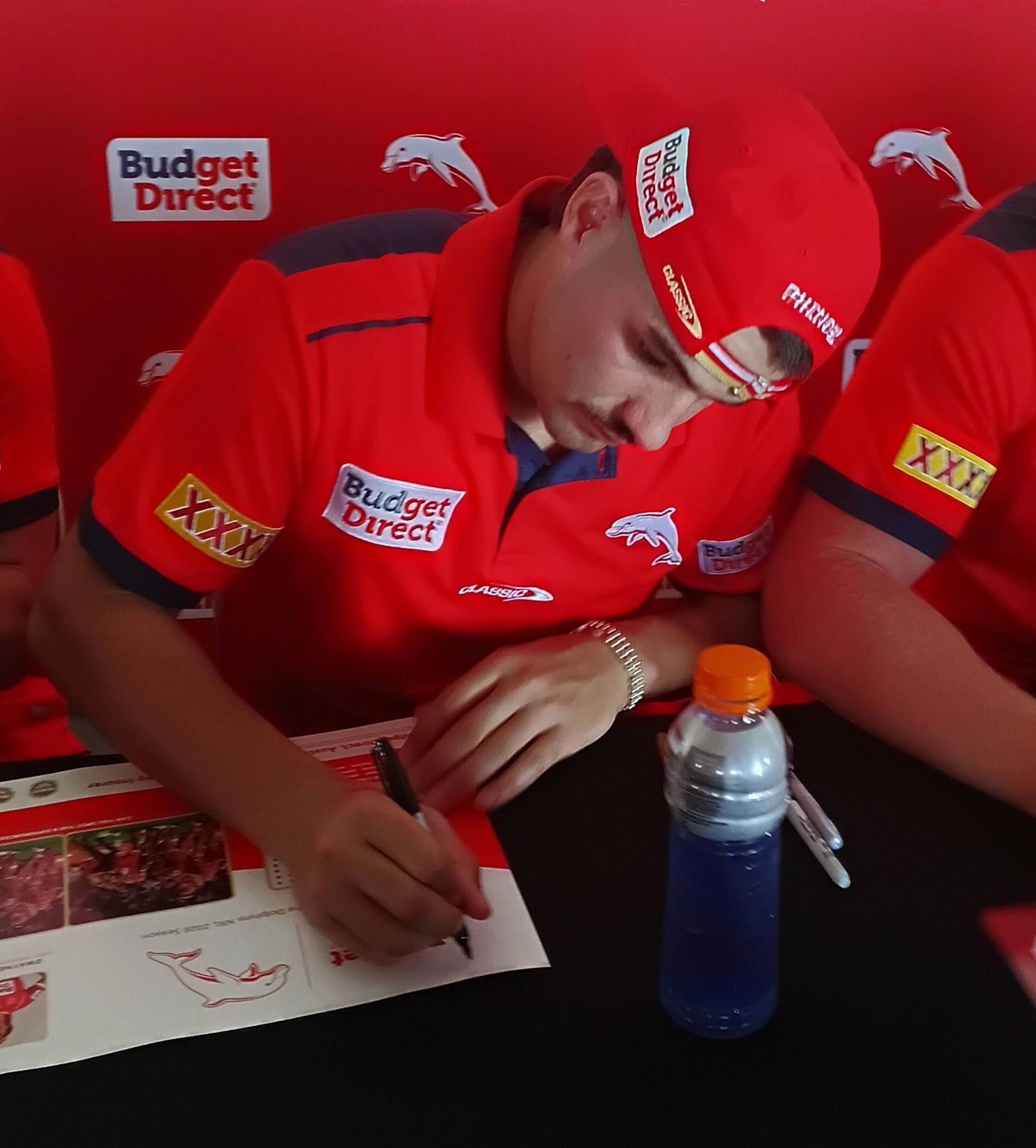
Farnworth in 2026

In February 2023, Farnworth signed a three-year contract to play for the Dolphins from the 2024 NRL season onwards. During the first seven minutes of his debut game for the Dolphins, Farnworth scored a try against the Gold Coast Titans at Sunshine Coast Stadium in week one of the 2024 NRL pre-season. In round 23 of the 2024 NRL season, Farnworth scored two tries in a Man of the Match performance for the Dolphins in their 34-32 golden point extra-time victory against the New Zealand Warriors. In round 26, Farnworth scored two tries for the Dolphins in their 40-6 victory his former side Brisbane. Farnworth played a total of 20 games for the Dolphins in the 2024 NRL season as the club finished 10th on the table. In 2025 Farnworth played 19 games for the Phins, scoring 12 tries and was awarded the Arthur Beeston Medal as the Dolphins player of the year.

On 9 October 2025, the Redcliffe based club announced that Farnworth had re-signed with them until the end of 2027. Farnworth played 25 games for the club in the 2026 NRL season including their preliminary final loss to eventual premiers the Sydney Roosters.

== International career ==
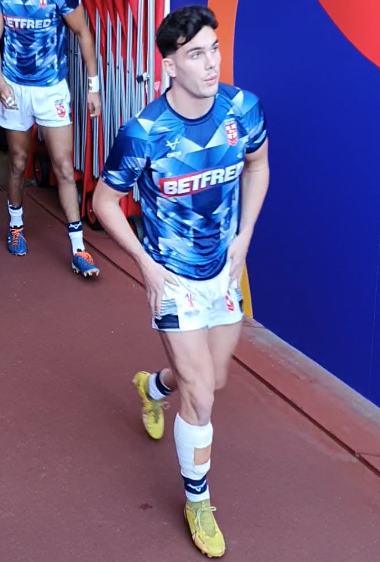
Farnworth playing for England in 2022

On 15 October 2022, Farnworth made his England debut against Samoa in the 2021 Rugby League World Cup scoring one try as England won the match 60-6. On 12 November, Farnworth scored two tries for England in their 27-26 semi-final loss to Samoa at the Emirates Stadium.

On 2 November 2024, he scored two tries in the 34-16 2nd test win over Samoa and was awarded Man of the Match.

== Honours ==
Individual

- Brisbane Broncos Rookie of The Year: 2020
- Brisbane Broncos 'Allan Langer Award' Best Back: 2021
- Dally M Team of the Year (centres): 2023, 2024, 2026
- Battle Medal: 2024
- Arthur Beeston Medal: 2025, 2026

== Statistics ==
Year	Team	Games	Tries	Goals	Pts
2019	Brisbane Broncos	2	0	0	0
2020	Brisbane Broncos	19	6	3	30
2021	Brisbane Broncos	20	3	11	34
2022	Brisbane Broncos	12	10	0	40
2023	Brisbane Broncos	26	15	0	60
2024	Dolphins	20	8	0	32
2025	Dolphins	19	12	0	48
2026	Dolphins	19	9	0	36
2027	Dolphins				
	Totals	137	63	14	280
