= 2026 Dally M Awards =

National Rugby League Awards

- Date: 30 September 2026
- Location: The Cutaway, Sydney
- Hosted by: Yvonne Sampson
- Dally M Medal: Nathan Cleary; Tamika Upton

Television/radio coverage
- Network: Fox League

The 2026 Dally M Awards were presented on 30 September 2026. They are the official annual awards of the National Rugby League and are named after Dally Messenger.

The voting process remained unchanged from the previous season; two judges each award six points per regular season match, split between three players with the best player receiving three points. The maximum votes a player could receive per match is six. Players given a one-game suspension received a six-point deduction, while players suspended for two or more games remained ineligible to receive any awards.

Penrith Panthers halfback Nathan Cleary won his first Dally M Medal, while Brisbane Broncos fullback Tamika Upton won her third Dally M Medal after previously winning in 2023 and 2025.

Cleary was the first Penrith player to win the award since Greg Alexander won in 1985.

== Dally M Medal ==
Dally M Player of the Year (Men):

Player votes tally – Top 10
Points	Player (Men)
67	Nathan Cleary
53	Braydon Trindall
52	Dylan Edwards
46	Haumole Olakau'atu
45	Herbie Farnworth
45	Scott Drinkwater
39	Jackson Ford
37	Harry Grant
37	James Tedesco
37	Kalyn Ponga

Dally M Player of the Year (Women):

Player votes tally – Top 10
Points	Player (Women)
31	Tamika Upton
29	Raecene McGregor
23	Tarryn Aiken
22	Evania Isa'ako
20	Jessica Sergis
20	Jesse Southwell
20	Teagan Levi
18	Sienna Lofipo
17	Isabelle Kelly
16	Abbi Church

== Dally M Awards ==
The Dally M Awards were, as usual, held before the Grand Final and did not take games played in the finals series into account.

Award	Player
Provan-Summons Medal (Spirit of the Game)(Mens)	Jai Arrow
Rookie of the Year	Ethan Sanders
Captain of the Year	James Fisher-Harris
Coach of the Year	Andrew Webster
Top Tryscorer of the Year (Ken Irvine Medal)	Alex Johnston
Top Tryscorer of the Year (Ken Irvine Medal)	Thomas Jenkins
Top Pointscorer of the Year	Jamayne Isaako
Ken Stephen Medal	Campbell Graham
Kia Try of the Year	Alex Johnston
Youi Tackle of the Year	Taine Tuaupiki
Peter Frilingos Headline Moment of the Year	Jai Arrow
Provan-Summons Medal (Spirit of the Game)(Women's)	Apii Nicholls (Note: On behalf of the New Zealand Warriors.)
NRLW Rookie of the year	Mercedez Taulelei-Siala
NRLW Captain of the Year	Kezie Apps
NRLW Coach of the Year	Karyn Murphy
NRLW Top Tryscorer of the Year	Jessica Sergis
NRLW Top Pointscorer of the Year	Jesse Southwell
NRLW Top Pointscorer of the Year	Jocelyn Kelleher
NRLW Try of the Year	Mackenzie Wiki
NRLW Tackle of the Year	Essay Banu
Veronica White Medal	Millie Elliott

=== Team of the Year ===
Award	Player
Best Fullback	Dylan Edwards
Best Wingers	Thomas Jenkins
Best Wingers	Selwyn Cobbo
Best Centres	Herbie Farnworth
Best Centres	Robert Toia
Best Five-Eighth	Braydon Trindall
Best Halfback	Nathan Cleary
Best Hooker	Wayde Egan
Best Props	James Fisher-Harris
Best Props	Naufahu Whyte
Best Second-Rowers	Haumole Olakau'atu
Best Second-Rowers	Hamish Stewart
Best Lock	Erin Clark

=== Women's Team of the Year ===
Award	Player
Best Fullback	Tamika Upton
Best Wingers	Julia Robinson
Best Wingers	Brydie Parker
Best Centres	Isabelle Kelly
Best Centres	Jessica Sergis
Best Five-Eighth	Teagan Levi
Best Halfback	Raecene McGregor
Best Hooker	Keeley Nizza
Best Props	Millie Elliott
Best Props	Sarah Togatuki
Best Second-Rowers	Evania Isa'ako
Best Second-Rowers	Shaylee Bent
Best Lock	Olivia Kernick

== See also ==
- Dally M Awards
- Dally M Medal
- 2026 NRL season
