= 2009 Dally M Awards =

- Date: 8 September
- Location: State Theatre
- Dally M Medal: Jarryd Hayne

Television/radio coverage
- Network: Fox Sports

The 2009 Dally M Awards were presented on Tuesday 8 September 2009 at the State Theatre in Sydney and broadcast on Fox Sports.

== Dally M Medal-Player of the Year ==
Presented by the Prime Minister of Australia, Kevin Rudd
Dally M Player of the Year
Winner:

Jarryd Hayne, Parramatta Eels

=== Player votes tally (top 10) ===
Player	Points	Club
Jarryd Hayne	30	Parramatta Eels
Johnathan Thurston	27	North Queensland Cowboys
Jamie Soward	26	St. George Illawarra Dragons
Robbie Farah	24	Wests Tigers
Anthony Watmough	24	Manly Sea Eagles
Kurt Gidley	23	Newcastle Knights
John Sutton	23	South Sydney Rabbitohs
Billy Slater	21	Melbourne Storm
Brett Kimmorley	20	Bulldogs
Michael Ennis	19	Bulldogs

== Dally M Awards ==
The Dally M Awards were, as usual, conducted at the close of the regular season and hence do not take games played in the finals series into account. The Dally M Medal is for the official player of the year while the Provan-Summons Medal is for the fans' of "people's choice" player of the year.

Award	Player	Club
Dally M Medal	Jarryd Hayne	Parramatta Eels
Provan-Summons Medal	Jamie Soward	St. George Illawarra Dragons
Rookie of the Year	Jamal Idris	Canterbury Bulldogs
Captain of the Year	Andrew Ryan	Canterbury Bulldogs
Rep Player of the Year	Greg Inglis	Melbourne Storm
Coach of the Year	Kevin Moore	Canterbury Bulldogs
Top Tryscorer of the Year	Brett Morris (22 Tries)	St. George Illawarra Dragons
Top Pointscorer of the Year	Hazem El Masri (234 Points)	Canterbury Bulldogs
Peter Frilingos Memorial Award	Nathan Merritt (Field goal against Wests Tigers in rd 10)	South Sydney Rabbitohs
Toyota Cup Player of the Year	Beau Henry	St. George Illawarra Dragons

Team of the Year

Award	Player	Club
Best Fullback	Jarryd Hayne	Parramatta Eels
Best Winger	Taniela Tuiaki	Wests Tigers
Best Centre	Josh Morris	Canterbury Bulldogs
Best Five-Eighth	Jamie Soward	St. George Illawarra Dragons
Best Halfback	Johnathan Thurston	North Queensland Cowboys
Best Lock	David Stagg	Canterbury Bulldogs
Best Second-Rower	Anthony Watmough	Manly-Warringah Sea Eagles
Best Prop	Ben Hannant	Canterbury Bulldogs
Best Hooker	Michael Ennis	Canterbury Bulldogs

== See also ==
- Dally M Awards
- Dally M Medal
- National Rugby League season 2009
