= 2007 Dally M Awards =

Australian sports awards

- Date: 4 September
- Location: Sydney Town Hall
- Dally M Medal: Johnathan Thurston

Television/radio coverage
- Network: Fox Sports

The 2007 Dally M Awards were presented on Tuesday 4 September 2007 at the Sydney Town Hall in Sydney and broadcast on Fox Sports. Warren Smith presided as Master of Ceremonies a role which he had held in previous years.

== Dally M Player of the Year ==
Presented by the Prime Minister of Australia, John Howard
Dally M Player of the Year
Winner:

Johnathan Thurston, North Queensland Cowboys

=== Player votes tally (top 10) ===
Player	Points	Club
Johnathan Thurston	36	North Queensland Cowboys
Robbie Farah	35	Wests Tigers
Cameron Smith	31	Melbourne Storm
Matt Bowen	30	North Queensland Cowboys
Greg Bird	23	Cronulla Sharks
Scott Prince	23	Gold Coast Titans
Brett Stewart	22	Manly Warringah Sea Eagles
Luke Bailey	21	Gold Coast Titans
Billy Slater	20	Melbourne Storm
Kurt Gidley	20	Newcastle Knights
Steve Price	20	New Zealand Warriors

== Special awards ==
Provan-Summons Medal (fan's choice for 2007's best player)
Presented by Norm Provan and Arthur Summons

Winner:

Nathan Hindmarsh, Parramatta Eels

Nominated:

Matt Bowen, North Queensland Cowboys
Steve Price, New Zealand Warriors
Robbie Farah, Wests Tigers

Peter Moore Award for Dally M Rookie of the Year

Winner:

Israel Folau, Melbourne Storm

Nominated:

Michael Jennings, Penrith Panthers
Cory Paterson, Newcastle Knights
Krisnan Inu, Parramatta Eels

Dally M Captain of the Year

Winner:

Steve Price, New Zealand Warriors

Nominated:

Alan Tongue, Canberra Raiders
Andrew Ryan, Canterbury Bulldogs
Cameron Smith, Melbourne Storm

Dally M Representative Player of the Year

Winner:

Cameron Smith, Melbourne Storm

Nominated:

Petero Civoniceva, Brisbane Broncos
Johnathan Thurston, North Queensland Cowboys
Steve Price, New Zealand Warriors

Dally M Coach of the Year

Winner:

Craig Bellamy, Melbourne Storm

Nominated:

Des Hasler, Manly Warringah Sea Eagles
Jason Taylor, South Sydney Rabbitohs
John Cartwright, Gold Coast Titans
Tim Sheens, Wests Tigers
Ivan Cleary, New Zealand Warriors

Peter Frilingos Memorial Award for the Headline Moment of the Year
Presented by David Penberthy, Editor of The Daily Telegraph

Winner:

Sydney Roosters golden point win over Wests Tigers in Round 22.

Nominated:

South Sydney's 37-12 win over Wests Tigers in Round 24.
Hero to Villain, Jarryd Hayne in State Of Origin 1.
Sydney Roosters and New Zealand Warriors 31-31 draw in Round 21.

Top Try Scorer
Winners:

Israel Folau, 21
Matt Bowen, 21

Top Point Scorer
Winner:

Hazem El Masri, 202

== Team of the Year ==
Best Fullback
Winner:

Matt Bowen, North Queensland Cowboys

Nominated:

Karmichael Hunt, Brisbane Broncos
Brett Stewart, Manly Warringah Sea Eagles
Wade McKinnon, New Zealand Warriors

Best Winger
Winner:

Jarryd Hayne, Parramatta Eels

Nominated:

Hazem El Masri, Canterbury Bulldogs
Eric Grothe, Parramatta Eels
Israel Folau, Melbourne Storm

Best Centre
Winner:

Justin Hodges, Brisbane Broncos

Nominated:

Matt Cooper, St George Dragons
Timana Tahu, Parramatta Eels
Matt King, Melbourne Storm

Best Five-Eighth
Winner:

Darren Lockyer, Brisbane Broncos

Nominated:

Ben Roberts, Canterbury Bulldogs
Braith Anasta, Sydney Roosters
Jamie Lyon, Manly Warringah Sea Eagles

Best Halfback
Winner:

Johnathan Thurston, North Queensland Cowboys

Nominated:

(won by default as he won Dally M)

Best Lock
Winner:

Dallas Johnson, Melbourne Storm

Nominated:

Best Second Rower
Winner:

Anthony Watmough, Manly Warringah Sea Eagles

Nominated:

Sonny Bill Williams, Canterbury Bulldogs
Nathan Hindmarsh, Parramatta Eels
Ryan Hoffman, Melbourne Storm

Best Prop
Winner:

Steve Price, New Zealand Warriors

Nominated:

Roy Asotasi, South Sydney Rabbitohs
Petero Civoniceva, Brisbane Broncos
Luke Bailey, Gold Coast Titans

Best Hooker
Winner:

Robbie Farah, Wests Tigers

Nominated:

(awarded to Farah after presentation of Dally M, no other nominations)

== Hall of Fame Inductees ==
- Arthur Halloway
- Tom Gorman
- Sid Pearce
- Harry Wells
- Keith Barnes
- Mick Cronin
