= 2022 Dally M Awards =

National Rugby League Awards

- Date: 28 September 2022
- Location: Randwick Racecourse, Sydney
- Hosted by: Yvonne Sampson
- Dally M Medal: Nicho Hynes; Raecene McGregor

Television/radio coverage
- Network: Fox League

The 2022 Dally M Awards were presented on 28 September 2022. They are the official annual awards of the National Rugby League and are named after Dally Messenger.

== Dally M Medal ==
Dally M Player of the Year (Men): Nicho Hynes

Player votes tally – Top 10
Points	Player (Men)
38	Nicho Hynes
33	James Tedesco
32	Ben Hunt
23	Dylan Edwards
23	Scott Drinkwater
22	Mitchell Moses
21	Daly Cherry-Evans
20	Isaah Yeo
19	Cameron Munster
19	Harry Grant

Dally M Player of the Year (Women): Raecene McGregor

Player votes tally – Top 10
Points	Player (Women)
9	Raecene McGregor
6	Tamika Upton
5	Tarryn Aiken
4	Sam Bremner
4	Isabelle Kelly
3	Emma Tonegato
3	Jesse Southwell
3	Keeley Davis
2	Jaime Chapman
2	Tayla Preston

== Dally M Awards ==
The Dally M Awards are, as usual, conducted at the close of the regular season and hence do not take games played in the finals series into account.

Award	Player
Provan-Summons Medal (Spirit of the Game) (Men's)	Nicho Hynes
Provan-Summons Medal (Spirit of the Game) (Women's)	Toni Hunt
Rookie of the Year	Jeremiah Nanai
Captain of the Year	Isaah Yeo
Coach of the Year	Todd Payten
Top Tryscorer of the Year (Ken Irvine Medal)	Alex Johnston (28 Tries)
Top Pointscorer of the Year	Valentine Holmes (304 Points)
VB Hard Earned Player of the Year Award	Isaiah Papali'i
Ken Stephen Medal (Note: Award announced at 2022 NRL Grand Final.)	Cody Walker
Drinkwise Try of the Year	Scott Drinkwater
Youi Tackle of the Year	Mitchell Moses
NRLW Rookie of the year	Jesse Southwell
NRLW Coach of the Year	John Strange
NRLW Captain of the Year	Isabelle Kelly
NRLW Try of the Year	Tarryn Aiken
NRLW Tackle of the Year	Tarryn Aiken
Veronica White Medal	Kennedy Cherrington

Team of the Year

Award	Player
Best Fullback	James Tedesco
Best Wingers	Joseph Suaalii
Best Wingers	Alex Johnston
Best Centres	Joseph Manu
Best Centres	Valentine Holmes
Best Five-Eighth	Cameron Munster
Best Halfback	Nicho Hynes
Best Lock	Isaah Yeo
Best Second-Rowers	Jeremiah Nanai
Best Second-Rowers	Viliame Kikau
Best Props	Payne Haas
Best Props	Joseph Tapine
Best Hooker	Apisai Koroisau

Woman's Team of the Year

Award	Player
Best Fullback	Sam Bremner
Best Wingers	Teagan Berry
Best Wingers	Jaime Chapman
Best Centres	Isabelle Kelly
Best Centres	Jessica Sergis
Best Five-Eighth	Tarryn Aiken
Best Halfback	Raecene McGregor
Best Lock	Simaima Taufa
Best Second-Rowers	Keilee Joseph
Best Second-Rowers	Olivia Kernick
Best Props	Caitlan Johnston
Best Props	Millie Boyle
Best Hooker	Keeley Davis

== See also ==
- Dally M Awards
- Dally M Medal
- 2022 NRL season
