= 2011 Dally M Awards =

- Date: 6 September
- Location: Entertainment Quarter
- Dally M Medal: Billy Slater

Television/radio coverage
- Network: Fox Sports

The 2011 Dally M Awards were presented on Tuesday 6 September 2011 at the Entertainment Quarter in Sydney and broadcast on Fox Sports.

== Dally M Medal ==
The Dally M Medallion was presented by Australian former rugby league footballer, Robert Laurie.

Dally M Player of the Year: Billy Slater

Player votes tally – Top 10

| Points | Player |
|---|---|
| 29 | Billy Slater |
| 27 | Benji Marshall |
| 25 | Cooper Cronk |
| 24 | Paul Gallen |
| 24 | Johnathan Thurston |
| 22 | Matthew Bowen |
| 22 | Chris Sandow |
| 21 | Kieran Foran |
| 20 | Corey Parker |
| 20 | Cameron Smith |

== Dally M Awards ==
The Dally M Awards were, as usual, conducted at the close of the regular season and hence do not take games played in the finals series into account. The Dally M Medal is for the official player of the year while the Provan-Summons Medal is for the fans' of "people's choice" player of the year.

| Award | Player |
|---|---|
| Provan-Summons Medal | Nathan Hindmarsh |
| Rookie of the Year | Daly Cherry-Evans |
| Captain of the Year | Cameron Smith |
| Representative Player of the Year | Cameron Smith |
| Coach of the Year | Craig Bellamy |
| Top Tryscorer of the Year | Nathan Merritt; Ben Barba; 23 tries |
| Top Pointscorer of the Year | Chris Sandow – 195 |
| Peter Frilingos Memorial Award | Paul Gallen – Man of the match performance in State of Origin Game Two |
| Toyota Cup Player of the Year | Jack De Belin |

Team of the Year

| Award | Player |
|---|---|
| Best Fullback | Billy Slater |
| Best Winger | Akuila Uate |
| Best Centre | Jamie Lyon |
| Best Five-Eighth | Benji Marshall |
| Best Halfback | Cooper Cronk |
| Best Lock | Paul Gallen |
| Best Second-Rower | Sam Thaiday |
| Best Prop | Matthew Scott |
| Best Hooker | Cameron Smith |

== See also ==
- Dally M Awards
- Dally M Medal
- 2011 NRL season
