= 2012 Dally M Awards =

- Date: 4 September
- Location: Sydney Town Hall
- Dally M Medal: Ben Barba

Television/radio coverage
- Network: Fox Sports

The 2012 Dally M Awards were presented on Tuesday 4 September 2012 at the Sydney Town Hall and broadcast on Fox Sports. They are the official annual awards of the 2012 NRL season.

== Dally M Medal ==
Player votes tally – Top 10
Points	Player
32	Ben Barba
26	Matthew Bowen
25	Cooper Cronk
24	Johnathan Thurston
20	Josh Reynolds
20	Cameron Smith
19	Mitchell Pearce
19	Billy Slater
19	Peter Wallace
19	Sam Burgess

== Dally M Awards ==
The Dally M Awards were, as usual, conducted at the close of the regular season and hence do not take games played in the finals series into account. The Dally M Medal is for the official player of the year while the Provan-Summons Medal is for the fans' of "people's choice" player of the year.

Award	Player
Provan-Summons Medal	Ben Barba
Rookie of the Year	Adam Reynolds
Captain(s)of the Year	Jamie Lyon and Jason King
Representative Player of the Year	Nate Myles
Coach of the Year	Des Hasler
Top Tryscorer of the Year	Ben Barba; Ashley Graham; 21 tries
Top Pointscorer of the Year	Jarrod Croker – 220
Peter Frilingos Memorial Award	Ben Barba – Barba's home-town performance in Mackay
Toyota Cup Player of the Year	David Klemmer

Team of the Year

Award	Player
Best Fullback	Ben Barba
Best Winger	Akuila Uate
Best Centre	Josh Morris
Best Five-Eighth	Johnathan Thurston
Best Halfback	Cooper Cronk
Best Lock	Paul Gallen
Best Second-Rower	Nate Myles
Best Prop	Sam Kasiano
Best Hooker	Cameron Smith

== See also ==
- Dally M Awards
- Dally M Medal
- 2012 NRL season
