= Dally M Medal =

- Current: 2026 Dally M Awards
- Awarded for: The Player of the year in the National Rugby League
- Country: Australia
- First award: 1979
- Currently held by: Nathan Cleary (2026)

Highlights
- Most awards: Johnathan Thurston (2005, 2007, 2014, 2015)

Television/radio coverage
- Network: Fox Sports

The Dally M Medal is awarded each year (annually) to the player voted for as the 'Player of the year' over the National Rugby League (NRL) regular season. The awards are named in honour of Australian former rugby league great Herbert Henry "Dally" Messenger. The award has existed since 1979, but has only been adopted as the official award for the Player of the Year in the NRL since 1998. Prior to that the official Player of the Year, in both the New South Wales and the Brisbane Rugby Leagues, received the Rothmans Medal whilst the Dally M Medal was awarded by the Daily Mirror newspaper.

== Voting ==
After each game, two independent judges each separately nominate three players as the best on the field. Each judge assigns three points to the best player of the match, two points to the second-best player, and one point to the third-best player. Additionally, a player will lose six votes for each week of suspension that he incurs during the season. Any player who is suspended from two matches or more in any one season is automatically ineligible for the award. The votes for each round are made public up to Round 12 (halfway through a 26-round season), then are kept secret; this allows the final winner to be kept secret until the Dally M Awards ceremony.

== History ==
=== Rothmans Medal ===
The Rothmans Medal was the first official player-of-the-year award to be established in rugby league in Australia. The medal was sponsored by Rothmans, Benson & Hedges Inc., a tobacco production company. There were two Rothmans Medals awarded each year: one for the best player in the New South Wales Rugby League, and one for the best player in the Brisbane Rugby League. The voting for the Rothmans Medal was the same basic format as the modern day Dally M, except that the votes were determined by the referees, rather than the media.

The two Rothmans Medals were first awarded in 1968, and were awarded each year until 1996. In 1997, the Rothmans Medal in New South Wales became known as the Provan-Summons medal, because all tobacco advertising and sponsorship was prohibited in Australia in 1992, under the Tobacco Advertising Prohibition Act 1992; the medal then disappeared altogether in 1998 with the merger of the Australian Rugby League and the Australian Super League. The Queensland Rothmans Medal was also last awarded in 1996, as the Queensland Cup superseded the Brisbane Rugby League as Queensland's premier rugby league competition in 1997.

=== Dally M Medal ===
The Dally M Medal was named after Henry Herbert 'Dally' Messenger, who was instrumental in the establishment of rugby league football in Australia. The award was originally established by The Daily Mirror newspaper in 1979. For many years, it was the second major individual award in the New South Wales Rugby League behind the Rothmans Medal. It was awarded each year between 1979 and 1996. With the Super League schism in 1997, the medal was not awarded.

Since the National Rugby League (NRL) was formed from the merger of the Australian Rugby League and the Australian Super League in 1998, the Dally M Medal has been the single official player-of-the-year award for that league, and the highest individual honour in Australian rugby league. The medal is awarded, usually by the Australian Prime Minister, at the annual Dally M Awards night where as well as honouring the player of the year, the NRL recognises the premier player in each position, the best coach and the most outstanding rookie of the season.

The medal was notably not awarded in 2003, with the players association threatening to boycott the event during a pay dispute with the league. This backfired badly on the players, with the league responding by swiftly cancelling the event. Penrith's Craig Gower, who led by one vote entering the final round and was unofficially considered man of the match in the final round, is the player thought to have missed out on winning the award as a result.

The 'Dally' part of Messenger's name was a misspelling of 'Dalley', a nickname given to him as a boy in the mid-1880s by his father Charles A. Messenger, a boating and sailing confrère of NSW politician and barrister William Bede Dalley.

== Dally M Medal winners ==
Denotes player who is still active in the NRL
Inducted into the National Rugby League Hall of Fame
Denotes player whose team won premiership that year

== NRL ==
Season	Player	Position	Team
1979	Steve Morris	Halfback	St George Dragons
1980	Robert Laurie	Five-eighth	South Sydney Rabbitohs
1981	Steve Rogers	Lock	Cronulla-Sutherland Sharks
1982	Ray Price	Lock	Parramatta Eels
1983	Terry Lamb	Five-eighth	Western Suburbs Magpies
1984	Michael Potter	Fullback	Canterbury-Bankstown Bulldogs
1985	Greg Alexander	Halfback	Penrith Panthers
1986	Peter Sterling	Halfback	Parramatta Eels (2)
1987	Peter Sterling (2)	Halfback	Parramatta Eels (3)
1988	Gavin Miller	Second-row	Cronulla-Sutherland Sharks (2)
1989	Gavin Miller (2)	Second-row	Cronulla-Sutherland Sharks (3)
1990	Cliff Lyons	Five-eighth	Manly Warringah Sea Eagles
1991	Michael Potter (2)	Fullback	St George Dragons (2)
1992	Gary Freeman	Halfback	Eastern Suburbs Roosters
1993	Ricky Stuart	Halfback	Canberra Raiders
1994	Cliff Lyons (2)	Five-eighth	Manly Warringah Sea Eagles (2)
1995	Laurie Daley	Five-eighth	Canberra Raiders (2)
1996	Allan Langer	Halfback	Brisbane Broncos
1998	Andrew Johns	Halfback	Newcastle Knights
1999	Andrew Johns (2)	Halfback	Newcastle Knights (2)
2000	Trent Barrett	Five-eighth	St George Illawarra Dragons
2001	Preston Campbell	Halfback, Fullback	Cronulla-Sutherland Sharks (4)
2002	Andrew Johns (3)	Halfback	Newcastle Knights (3)
2003	Not awarded due to industrial action		
2004	Danny Buderus	Hooker	Newcastle Knights (4)
2005	Johnathan Thurston	Halfback	North Queensland Cowboys
2006	Cameron Smith	Hooker	Melbourne Storm
2007	Johnathan Thurston (2)	Halfback	North Queensland Cowboys (2)
2008	Matt Orford	Halfback	Manly Warringah Sea Eagles (3)
2009	Jarryd Hayne	Fullback	Parramatta Eels (4)
2010	Todd Carney	Five-eighth	Sydney Roosters (2)
2011	Billy Slater	Fullback	Melbourne Storm (2)
2012	Ben Barba	Fullback	Canterbury-Bankstown Bulldogs (2)
2013	Cooper Cronk	Halfback	Melbourne Storm (3)
2014	Jarryd Hayne (2)	Fullback	Parramatta Eels (5)
2014	Johnathan Thurston (3)	Five-eighth	North Queensland Cowboys (3)
2015	Johnathan Thurston (4)	Halfback	North Queensland Cowboys (4)
2016	Cooper Cronk (2)	Halfback	Melbourne Storm (4)
2016	Jason Taumalolo	Lock	North Queensland Cowboys (5)
2017	Cameron Smith (2)	Hooker	Melbourne Storm (5)
2018	Roger Tuivasa-Sheck	Fullback	New Zealand Warriors
2019	James Tedesco	Fullback	Sydney Roosters (3)
2020	Jack Wighton	Five-eighth	Canberra Raiders (3)
2021	Tom Trbojevic	Fullback	Manly Warringah Sea Eagles (4)
2022	Nicho Hynes	Halfback	Cronulla-Sutherland Sharks (5)
2023	Kalyn Ponga	Fullback	Newcastle Knights (5)
2024	Jahrome Hughes	Halfback	Melbourne Storm (6)
2025	James Tedesco (2)	Fullback	Sydney Roosters (4)
2026	Nathan Cleary	Halfback	Penrith Panthers (2)

== NRLW ==
Season	Player	Position	Team
2018	Brittany Breayley	Hooker	Brisbane Broncos
2019	Jessica Sergis	Centre	St. George Illawarra Dragons
2020	Ali Brigginshaw	Lock	Brisbane Broncos (2)
2021	Millie Boyle	Prop	Brisbane Broncos (3)
2021	Emma Tonegato	Fullback	St. George Illawarra Dragons (2)
2022	Raecene McGregor	Halfback	Sydney Roosters
2023	Tamika Upton	Fullback	Newcastle Knights
2024	Olivia Kernick	Second-row	Sydney Roosters (2)
2025	Tamika Upton (2)	Fullback	Brisbane Broncos (4)
2026	Tamika Upton (3)	Fullback	Brisbane Broncos (5)

== Multiple winners ==
The following players have won the Dally M Medal multiple times.

Medals	Player	Team	Seasons
4	Johnathan Thurston	North Queensland Cowboys	2005, 2007, 2014, 2015
3	Andrew Johns	Newcastle Knights	1998, 1999, 2002
2	Peter Sterling	Parramatta Eels	1986, 1987
2	Gavin Miller	Cronulla-Sutherland Sharks	1988, 1989
2	Michael Potter	Canterbury-Bankstown Bulldogs, St George Dragons	1984, 1991
2	Cliff Lyons	Manly-Warringah Sea Eagles	1990, 1994
2	Jarryd Hayne	Parramatta Eels	2009, 2014
2	Cooper Cronk	Melbourne Storm	2013, 2016
2	Cameron Smith	Melbourne Storm	2006, 2017
2	James Tedesco	Sydney Roosters	2019, 2025

== Wins by club ==
Medals	Team	Seasons
6	Melbourne Storm	2006, 2011, 2013, 2016, 2017, 2024
5	Parramatta Eels	1982, 1986, 1987, 2009, 2014
5	North Queensland Cowboys	2005, 2007, 2014, 2015, 2016
5	Cronulla Sutherland Sharks	1981, 1988, 1989, 2001, 2022
5	Newcastle Knights	1998, 1999, 2002, 2004, 2023
4	Manly Warringah Sea Eagles	1990, 1994, 2008, 2021
4	Sydney Roosters	1992, 2010, 2019, 2025
3	Canberra Raiders	1993, 1995, 2020
2	St George Dragons	1979, 1991
2	Canterbury Bankstown Bulldogs	1984, 2012
2	Penrith Panthers	1985, 2026
1	South Sydney Rabbitohs	1980
1	Western Suburbs Magpies	1983
1	Brisbane Broncos	1996
1	St George Illawarra Dragons	2000
1	New Zealand Warriors	2018

- No award in 1997 and 2003
- Multiple winners in 2014 and 2016

== Venues and broadcasters ==
Year	Broadcaster(s)	Venue
1998	Fox Sports	Fox Studios Australia
1999	Fox Sports	Horden Pavilion
2000	Fox Sports	Sydney Town Hall
2001	Fox Sports	Lyric Theatre, The Star
2002	Fox Sports	
2003	No broadcaster	Not held
2004	Fox Sports	Sydney Town Hall
2005	Fox Sports	Sydney Town Hall
2006	Fox Sports	Sydney Town Hall
2007	Fox Sports	Sydney Town Hall
2008	Fox Sports	Hordern Pavilion
2009	Fox Sports	State Theatre
2010	Fox Sports	State Theatre
2011	Fox Sports	Royal Hall of Industries, The Entertainment Quarter
2012	Fox Sports	Sydney Town Hall
2013	Fox Sports	Star Casino
2014	Fox Sports	Star Casino
2015	Fox Sports	Star Casino
2016	Fox Sports	Star Casino
2017	Fox League	Star Casino
2018	Fox League	Overseas Passenger Terminal
2019	Fox League	Star Casino
2020	Fox League	Virtual Ceremony
2021	Fox League	Howard Smith Wharves, Brisbane
2022	Fox League	Randwick Racecourse, Sydney
2023	Fox League	Randwick Racecourse, Sydney
2024	Fox League	Randwick Racecourse, Sydney
2025	Fox League	Randwick Racecourse, Sydney
2026	Fox League	The Cutaway, Sydney

== See also ==
- Dally M Awards
- Clive Churchill Medal
- Man of Steel Award
- Brownlow Medal
