= 2025 Dally M Awards =

National Rugby League Awards

- Date: 1 October 2025
- Location: Randwick Racecourse, Sydney
- Hosted by: Braith Anasta
- Dally M Medal: James Tedesco; Tamika Upton

Television/radio coverage
- Network: Fox League

The 2025 Dally M Awards were presented on 1 October 2025. They are the official annual awards of the National Rugby League and are named after Dally Messenger.

The voting process remained unchanged from the previous season; two judges each award six points per regular season match, split between three players with the best player receiving three points. The maximum votes a player could receive per match is six. Players given a one-game suspension received a six-point deduction, while players suspended for two or more games remained ineligible to receive any awards.

== Dally M Medal ==
Dally M Player of the Year (Men):

Player votes tally – Top 10
| Points | Player (Men) |
|---|---|
| 67 | James Tedesco |
| 45 | Nathan Cleary |
| 44 | Isaiya Katoa |
| 44 | Payne Haas |
| 42 | Blayke Brailey |
| 42 | Tom Dearden |
| 41 | Reece Walsh |
| 40 | Luke Metcalf |
| 39 | Daly Cherry-Evans |
| 37 | Will Kennedy |

Dally M Player of the Year (Women):

Player votes tally – Top 10
| Points | Player (Women) |
|---|---|
| 35 | Tamika Upton |
| 32 | Julia Robinson |
| 31 | Jesse Southwell |
| 29 | Isabelle Kelly |
| 24 | Rachael Pearson |
| 22 | Jakiya Whitfield |
| 21 | Yasmin Clydsdale |
| 20 | Emma Verran |
| 18 | Tarryn Aiken |
| 17 | Olivia Kernick |

== Dally M Awards ==
The Dally M Awards were, as usual, conducted at the close of the regular season and hence did not take games played in the finals series into account.

| Award | Player |
|---|---|
| Provan-Summons Medal (Spirit of the Game)(Mens) | Zac Lomax |
| Rookie of the Year | Robert Toia |
| Captain of the Year | James Tedesco |
| Coach of the Year | Ricky Stuart |
| Top Tryscorer of the Year (Ken Irvine Medal) | Mark Nawaqanitawase |
| Top Pointscorer of the Year | Jamayne Isaako |
| Ken Stephen Medal | Kieran Foran |
| Drinkwise Try of the Year | Mark Nawaqanitawase |
| Youi Tackle of the Year | Ethan Strange |
| Peter Frilingos Headline Moment of the Year | Kaeo Weekes |
| Provan-Summons Medal (Spirit of the Game)(Women's) | Isabelle Kelly |
| NRLW Rookie of the year | Shalom Sauaso |
| NRLW Captain of the Year | Isabelle Kelly |
| NRLW Coach of the Year | John Strange |
| NRLW Top Tryscorer of the Year | Tamika Upton |
| NRLW Top Pointscorer of the Year | Romy Teitzel |
| NRLW Try of the Year | Indie Bostock |
| NRLW Tackle of the Year | Ivana Lauitiiti |
| Veronica White Medal | Rhiannon Byers |

Team of the Year

| Award | Player |
|---|---|
| Best Fullback | James Tedesco |
| Best Wingers | Mark Nawaqanitawase |
| Best Wingers | Xavier Coates |
| Best Centres | Kotoni Staggs |
| Best Centres | Stephen Crichton |
| Best Five-Eighth | Ethan Strange |
| Best Halfback | Nathan Cleary |
| Best Hooker | Blayke Brailey |
| Best Props | Addin Fonua-Blake |
| Best Props | Payne Haas |
| Best Second-Rowers | Eliesa Katoa |
| Best Second-Rowers | Hudson Young |
| Best Lock | Erin Clark |

Women's Team of the Year

| Award | Player |
|---|---|
| Best Fullback | Tamika Upton |
| Best Wingers | Payton Takimoana |
| Best Wingers | Sheridan Gallagher |
| Best Centres | Isabelle Kelly |
| Best Centres | Julia Robinson |
| Best Five-Eighth | Gayle Broughton |
| Best Halfback | Jesse Southwell |
| Best Hooker | Emma Manzelmann |
| Best Props | Ellie Johnston |
| Best Props | Jessika Elliston |
| Best Second-Rowers | Romy Teitzel |
| Best Second-Rowers | Yasmin Clydsdale |
| Best Lock | Olivia Kernick |

== See also ==
- Dally M Awards
- Dally M Medal
- 2025 NRL season
