= 2013 Dally M Awards =

- Date: 3 October
- Location: The Star Sydney
- Hosted by: Tony Squires
- Dally M Medal: Cooper Cronk

Television/radio coverage
- Network: Fox Sports

The 2013 Dally M Awards were presented on Tuesday 1 October 2013 at Sydney's Star Casino and broadcast on Fox Sports. They were the official annual awards of the 2013 NRL season.

== Judges ==
The 13 judges for the 2013 Dally M's were:

Fox Sports: Greg Alexander, Gary Belcher and Ben Ikin

Channel 9: Brad Fittler, Andrew Johns and Wally Lewis

Sky NZ: Daryl Halligan

The Daily Telegraph: Paul Crawley, Paul Kent, Josh Massoud, Dean Ritchie, Barry Toohey, Nick Walshaw and Justin Newlan

== Dally M Medal ==
Player votes tally – Top 10
Points	Player
28	Cooper Cronk
26	Todd Carney
26	Daly Cherry-Evans
26	Johnathan Thurston
20	Jarrod Mullen
20	Cameron Smith
18	John Sutton
18	Josh Reynolds
18	Luke Walsh
18	James Maloney

== Dally M Awards ==
The Dally M Awards were, as usual, conducted at the close of the regular season and hence do not take games played in the finals series into account. The Dally M Medal is for the official player of the year while the Provan-Summons Medal is for the fans' of "people's choice" player of the year.

Award	Player
Provan-Summons Medal	Greg Inglis
Rookie of the Year	George Burgess
Captain of the Year	Cameron Smith
Representative Player of the Year	Cameron Smith
Coach of the Year	Trent Robinson
Top Tryscorer of the Year	David Simmons; David Williams; James McManus; 19 tries
Top Pointscorer of the Year	James Maloney – 230
Try of the Year	David Nofoaluma – Rd.20 vs Manly
Peter Frilingos Memorial Award	Sam, Thomas, Luke and George Burgess – Four brothers playing together for the first time for South Sydney
Holden Cup Player of the Year	Bryce Cartwright

Team of the Year

Award	Player
Best Fullback	Greg Inglis
Best Winger	Roger Tuivasa-Sheck
Best Centre	Jamie Lyon
Best Five-Eighth	Todd Carney; Johnathan Thurston
Best Halfback	Cooper Cronk
Best Lock	Corey Parker
Best Second-Rower	Boyd Cordner
Best Prop	Andrew Fifita
Best Hooker	Cameron Smith

== See also ==
- Dally M Awards
- Dally M Medal
- 2013 NRL season
