= Stephen Crichton =

Samoa international rugby league footballer

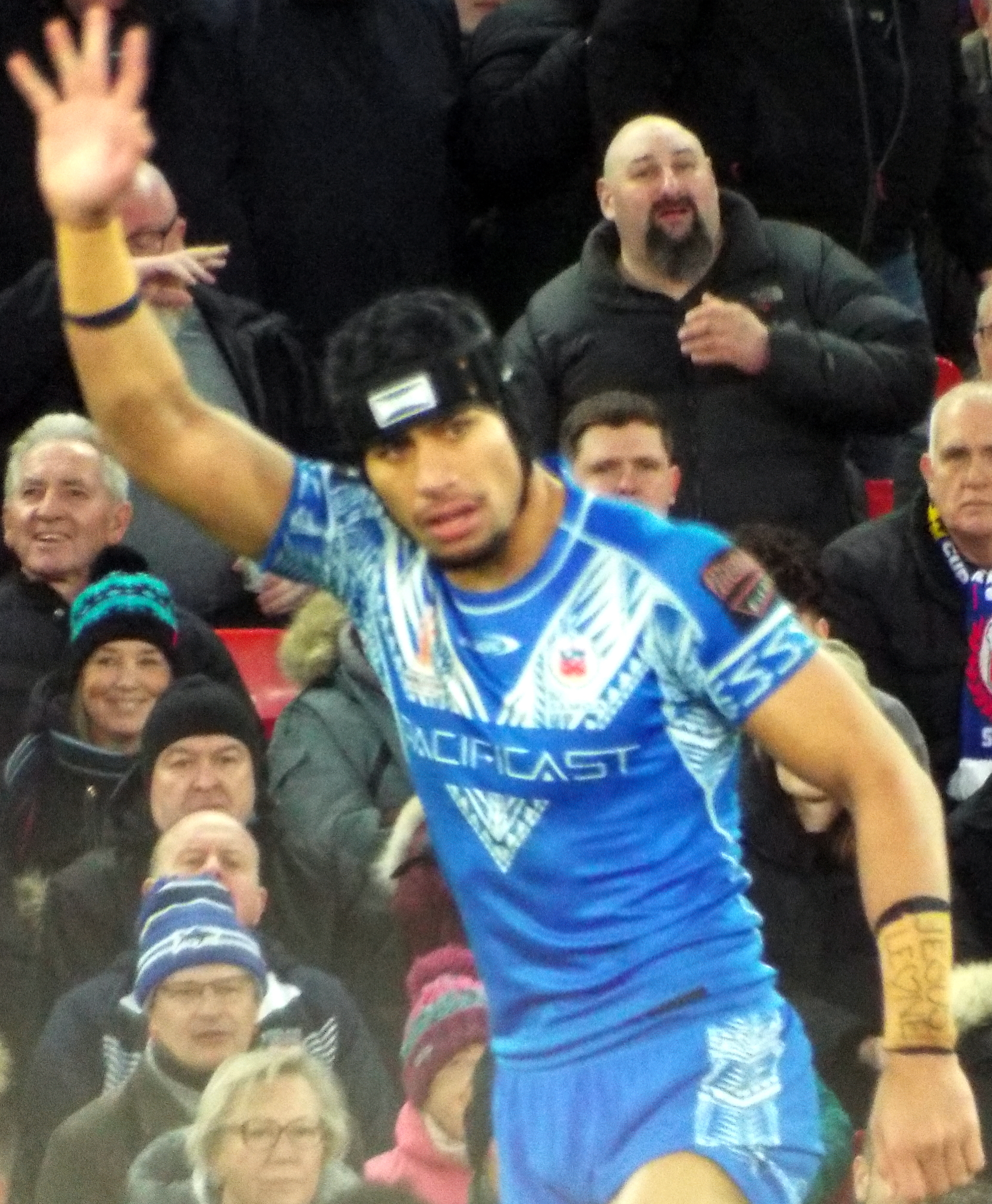

Personal information
- Full name: Stephen Crichton
- Born: 22 September 2000 (age 26) Apia, Samoa
- Height: 193 cm (6 ft 4 in)
- Weight: 99 kg (15 st 8 lb)

Playing information
- Position: Centre, Five-eighth
Club
Years	Team	Pld	T	G	FG	P
2019–23	Penrith Panthers	100	56	74	0	372
2024–	Canterbury Bulldogs	62	20	110	2	302
	Total	162	76	184	2	674
Representative
Years	Team	Pld	T	G	FG	P
2022–26	New South Wales	14	3	5	0	22
2022–	Samoa	12	7	44	1	117
- Source: As of 14 November 2026
- Education: Patrician Brothers' College, Blacktown
- Relatives: Christian Crichton (brother); Harmony Crichton (sister)

Stephen Crichton (born 22 September 2000), nicknamed "Critta", is a Samoan professional rugby league footballer who captains and plays as a centre for the Canterbury Bankstown Bulldogs in the National Rugby League. He has represented New South Wales in the State of Origin series and Samoa at international level.

Crichton previously played for the Penrith Panthers in the NRL, with whom he won the 2021, 2022 and 2023 NRL Grand Finals. Crichton has the distinction of scoring a try in each of Penrith's four consecutive grand final appearances (2020 to 2023). (Note: Crichton's feat of scoring a try in four consecutive grand finals is surpassed only by Johnny King's seven tries in six consecutive grand finals for St. George between 1960 and 1965.)

== Background ==
Crichton was born in Apia, Samoa. He moved to Auckland, New Zealand, at the age of two, before his family eventually settled in Sydney, New South Wales, Australia. He is the younger brother of former Penrith Panthers player Christian Crichton.

== Early life ==
Crichton played his junior rugby league with St Clair Comets. He attended Patrician Brothers' College, Blacktown. Crichton also played Australian rules football throughout his schooling years while at Brothers' and trialled for the GWS Giants Academy, before quitting the sport to focus solely on rugby league in high school.

== Career ==
=== 2019 ===
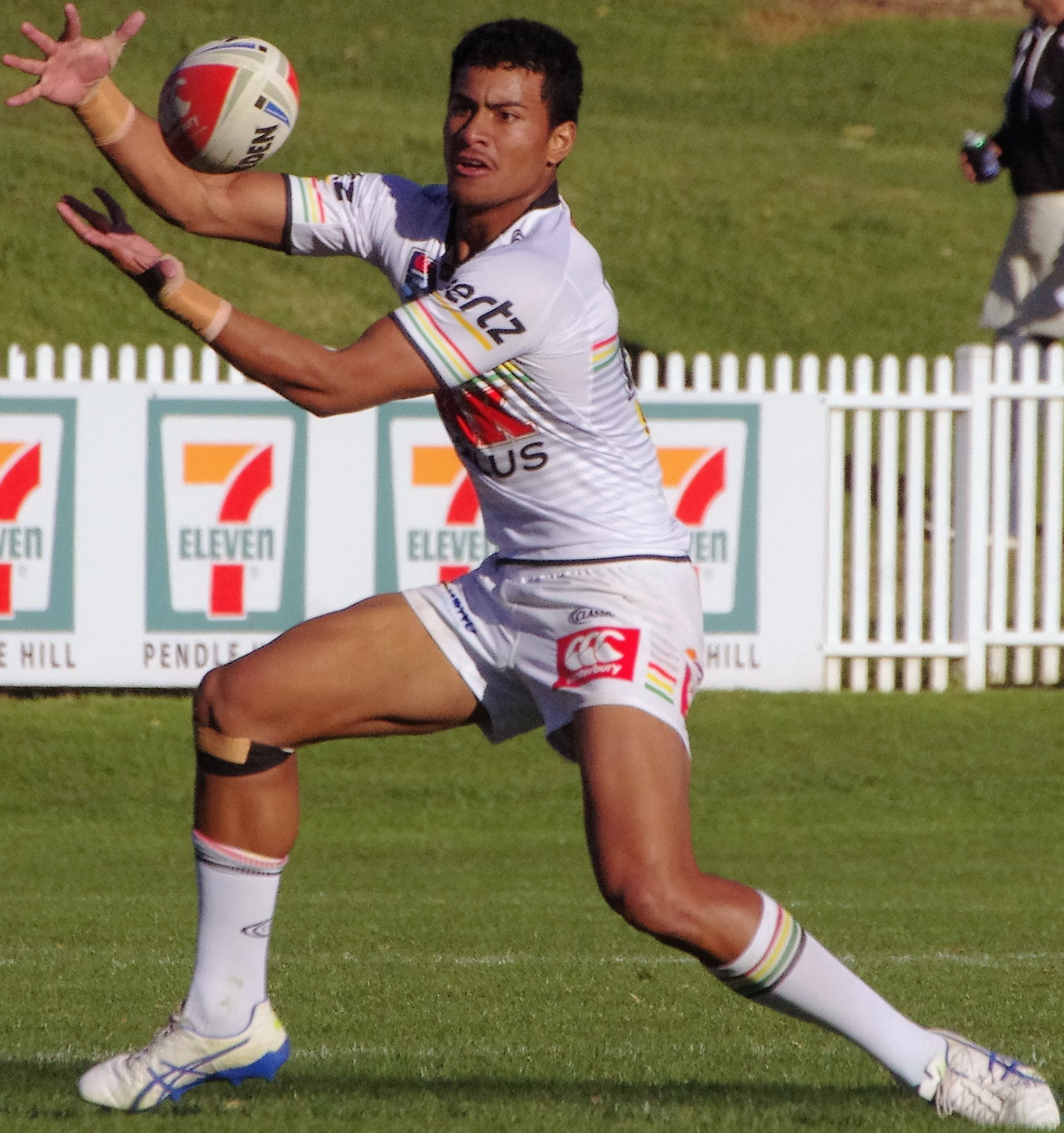
Crichton playing for Penrith in 2019

Crichton made his first-grade debut for Penrith against the Cronulla-Sutherland Sharks in round 21 of the 2019 NRL season which ended in a 26–20 victory for Penrith at Panthers Stadium.

=== 2020 ===
In round 8 of the 2020 NRL season, Crichton scored two tries as Penrith defeated the Wests Tigers 19–12 at Bankwest Stadium.

Crichton had a breakout year for Penrith in the 2020 NRL season playing 22 games and scoring 17 tries as Penrith won the minor premiership. Crichton played in the 2020 NRL Grand Final, scoring a try in the second half as Penrith were defeated by Melbourne 26–20. For a successful individual season, Crichton was named Centre of the Year at the 2020 Dally M Awards and rewarded with a spot in the New South Wales State of Origin 27-man squad although he did not play in the three game series.

=== 2021 ===
In round 5 of the 2021 NRL season, Crichton was fined $1350 by the NRL for pulling benched Canberra Raiders player Joseph Tapine into a celebratory throng and goading him.

Critchton played a total of 26 games for Penrith in the 2021 NRL season including the club's 2021 NRL Grand Final victory over the South Sydney Rabbitohs. Crichton scored what would be the match winning try off an intercepted Cody Walker pass as Penrith held on to win 14–12.

On 19 October, Crichton was handed a proposed $4000 fine by the NRL and a breach notice which alleges that he acted contrary to the best interests of the game after he was photographed on social media acting in a disrespectful manner toward the Provan-Summons Trophy. Although Crichton nor any of the Penrith players had broken the trophy, the NRL alleged Crichton and teammate Nathan Cleary showed disrespect towards the individuals depicted in the iconic moment on the trophy.

=== 2022 ===
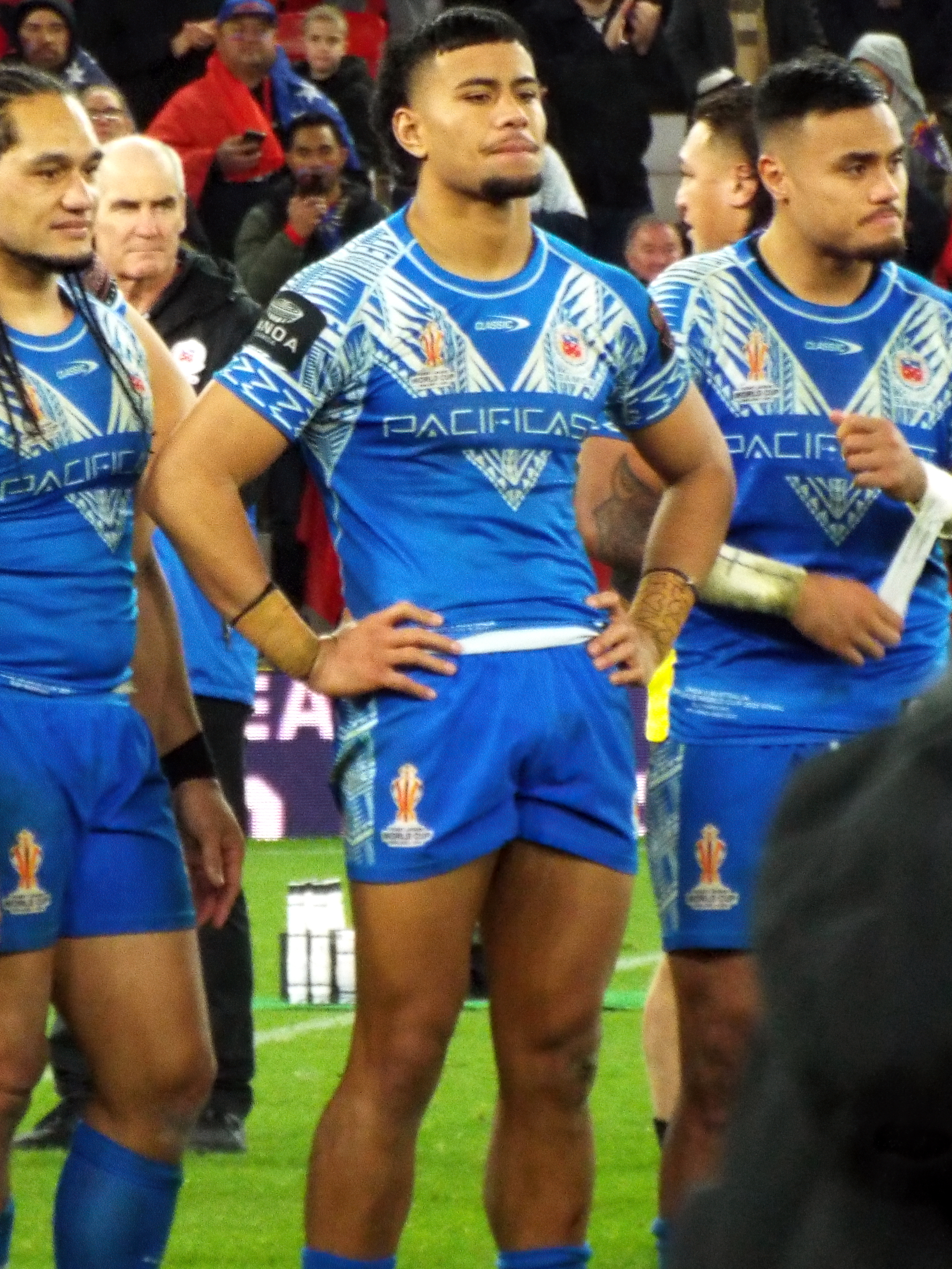
Crichton with Samoa in 2022

In round 7 of the 2022 NRL season, Crichton scored a hat-trick in Penrith's 36–6 victory over Canberra. Crichton played a total of 23 games for Penrith throughout the year including the clubs 2022 NRL Grand Final victory over Parramatta. Crichton scored the opening try in the final which finished 28–12 in Penrith's favour.

In October, Crichton was named in the Samoa squad for the 2021 Rugby League World Cup.

In the 2021 Rugby League World Cup semi-final, Crichton scored two tries and kicked the winning drop goal for Samoa as they defeated England 27–26 in golden point extra-time at the Emirates Stadium. He finished the tournament as the top point scorer with 73 points. Crichton played for Samoa in their Rugby League World Cup final loss to Australia.

In November he was named in the 2021 RLWC Team of the Tournament.

=== 2023 ===
On 16 January, Crichton's management informed Penrith that he would be seeking other opportunities for 2024. On 19 January, Fox League reported that Crichton signed with the Canterbury-Bankstown Bulldogs for four years starting in 2024, which was confirmed by the club on January 22. On 18 February, Crichton played in Penrith's 13–12 upset loss to St Helens RFC in the 2023 World Club Challenge. In round 8 of the 2023 NRL season, Crichton scored a hat-trick in Penrith's 20–18 loss against South Sydney. On 22 May, Crichton was selected by New South Wales in the extended squad for game one of the 2023 State of Origin series.

Crichton was instrumental in the club's 26–24 victory over Brisbane in the 2023 NRL Grand Final as Penrith won their third straight premiership, successfully overturning a 24–8 deficit in the final 20 minutes. Crichton kicked the opening conversion of the grand final, in addition to scoring the second try of Penrith's comeback, breaking through three tacklers to emphatically slam the ball over the try line. In the final minutes of the match, Crichton managed two clutch kicks that both found out-of-position Broncos defenders and forced repeat sets. The second would prove decisive, capitalised upon by Nathan Cleary to score the match-winning try. The grand final was Crichton's 100th and final match for the Panthers.

=== 2024 ===
On 22 February, Crichton was announced as the captain of the Canterbury-Bankstown Bulldogs. In round 1 of the 2024 NRL season, Crichton scored a try on debut for Canterbury as they were defeated 26–8 against arch-rivals Parramatta. On 26 May, Crichton was named at centre for New South Wales ahead of the 2024 State of Origin series. In round 14, Crichton scored two tries for Canterbury in their 22-18 win over arch-rivals Parramatta. In round 22, Crichton scored two tries for Canterbury in their 22-18 win over Canberra at Belmore Sports Ground. Crichton played 21 games for Canterbury in the 2024 NRL season scoring ten tries as the club qualified for the finals finishing 6th. Crichton played in their elimination finals loss against Manly. On 2 October, Crichton was named at centre in the Dally M Team of the Year, and was awarded Captain of the Year.

=== 2025 ===
In May, Crichton was selected by New South Wales ahead of game one in the 2025 State of Origin series. He played in all three games as New South Wales lost the series 2-1.

Following an MCL injury to Canterbury teammate Matt Burton in a 40-24 round 2 victory against the Gold Coast Titans, Crichton took over as Canterbury's primary goalkicker. Crichton was pivotal in Canterbury's biggest comeback since 2001, as coach Cameron Ciraldo described his performance in the 32-20 away win against the Canberra Raiders as "putting the team on his back and turning nothing into something".

In Canterbury's visit to Melbourne in round 25, Crichton was denied what would have been a match-levelling try as he failed to re-grip the ball before grounding. This controversial moment sparked debate amongst NRL legends such as Andrew Johns, who believed the rule was unfair, stating "That should be a try. Tell me how are you suppose to re-grip the ball? It's impossible."

Crichton captained the Canterbury outfit to their first win against the Penrith Panthers since 2019 in round 26, with a 28-4 victory. Penrith controversially rested 16 of the players who played the previous week in a bid to prepare for the finals. This victory means that Crichton has now recorded victories against all of the 17 current NRL sides, having lost his first two encounters with his old club.

Crichton played 21 games for Canterbury in the 2025 NRL season as the club finished third and qualified for the finals. Canterbury would be eliminated from the finals in straight sets.

On 2 October 2025, Canterbury announced that Crichton had signed a long term extension until the end of 2031.

=== 2026 ===
In round 1 of the 2026 NRL season, Crichton kicked the winning field goal during golden point extra-time as Canterbury controversially defeated St. George Illawarra 15-14 at the Allegiant Stadium in Las Vegas. In May, Crichton was selected by New South Wales for game one in the 2026 State of Origin series. Crichton played all three games for New South Wales as they won the series 2-1. Chrichton played 20 matches for Canterbury in the 2026 NRL season as the club finished 12th on the table.

== Honours ==
Individual

- Dally M Centre of The Year: 2020, 2023, 2024, 2025
- Dally M Captain of the Year: 2024
- Rugby League World Cup Team of the tournament: 2021

Club

- 2020 Minor Premiership Winners
- 2021 NRL Grand Final Winners
- 2022 Minor Premiership Winners
- 2022 NRL Grand Final Winners
- 2023 Minor Premiership Winners
- 2023 NRL Grand Final Winners

State of Origin

- State of Origin Series Wins: 2024, 2026

International

- 2021 Rugby League World Cup final

== Statistics ==
=== Club ===
†	Denotes seasons in which Crichton won an NRL Premiership

Number	Team	Matches	T	G	GK %	F/G	Points
2019	Penrith	4	—	—	—	0	—
2020	Penrith	22	17	7	70.00%	0	82
2021†	Penrith	27	11	14	70.00%	0	72
2022†	Penrith	23	13	32	82.05%	0	116
2023†	Penrith	24	15	21	84.00%	0	102
2024	Bulldogs	21	10	1	100.00%	0	42
2025	Bulldogs	21	3	57	79.17%	0	126
2026	Bulldogs	15	7	37			104
Career totals		157	76	169	79.04%	0	644
