= Jack Wighton =

Australia international rugby league footballer

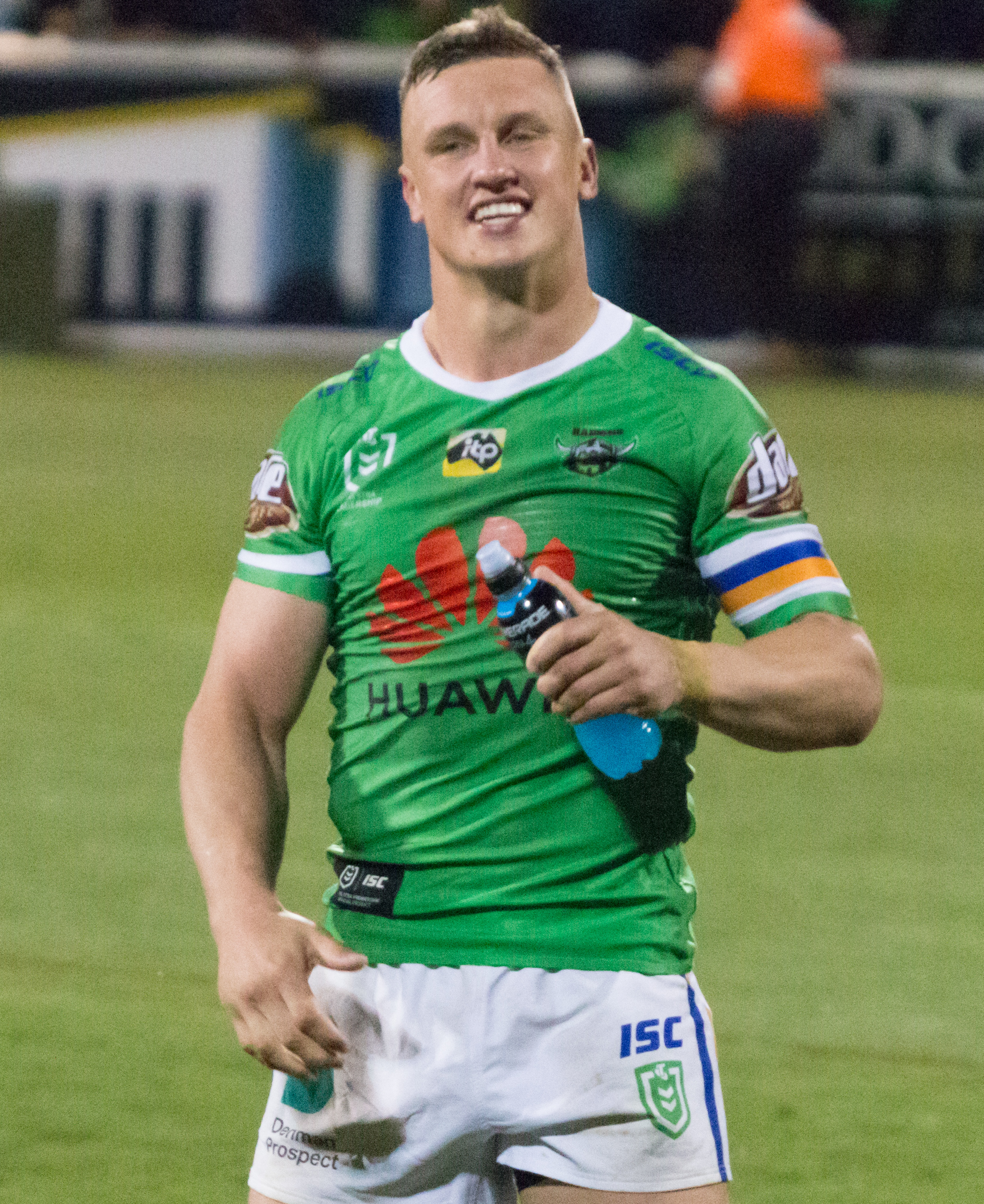

Personal information
- Full name: Jack Daniel Wighton
- Born: 4 February 1993 (age 33) Orange, New South Wales, Australia
- Height: 190 cm (6 ft 3 in)
- Weight: 96 kg (15 st 2 lb)

Playing information
- Position: Five-eighth, Fullback, Centre
Club
| Years | Team | Pld | T | G | FG | P |
|---|---|---|---|---|---|---|
| 2012–23 | Canberra Raiders | 242 | 75 | 0 | 0 | 300 |
| 2024– | South Sydney | 55 | 16 | 0 | 0 | 64 |
| | Total | 297 | 91 | 0 | 0 | 364 |
Representative
| Years | Team | Pld | T | G | FG | P |
| 2013–21 | Indigenous All Stars | 6 | 0 | 0 | 0 | 0 |
| 2013–16 | NSW Country | 4 | 1 | 0 | 0 | 4 |
| 2015 | Prime Minister's XIII | 1 | 1 | 0 | 0 | 4 |
| 2019–22 | New South Wales | 10 | 3 | 0 | 0 | 12 |
| 2019–22 | Australia | 7 | 3 | 0 | 0 | 12 |
- Source: As of 11 September 2026

Jack Wighton (born 4 February 1993) is an Australian professional rugby league footballer who plays as a centre for the South Sydney Rabbitohs in the National Rugby League (NRL) and for the Indigenous All Stars.

Wighton previously played for the Canberra Raiders, with whom he won the Clive Churchill Medal in the 2019 NRL Grand Final, playing as a five-eighth. Wighton played for Australia at international level, playing centre in the 2022 Rugby League World Cup Final. He played for New South Wales in State of Origin as a bench utility, centre and five-eighth. He represented the Prime Minister's XIII as a fullback and for Country Origin as a centre and fullback. Wighton started his NRL career as a winger before moving to centre, five-eighth and fullback. He won the 2020 Dally M Medal playing five-eighth for the Raiders.

== Background ==
Wighton was born in Orange, New South Wales, Australia. He is Wiradjuri on his mother's side, and his family are from Peak Hill (Bulgandramine Mission) and Wellington, New South Wales. Other rugby league players that Wighton is related to include Brent Naden, Willie Tonga, and Latrell Mitchell.

Wighton played his junior football for Orange CYMS and Bloomfield Tigers before being signed by the Canberra Raiders. He played for the Werribee Centrals Football Club reserves sides.

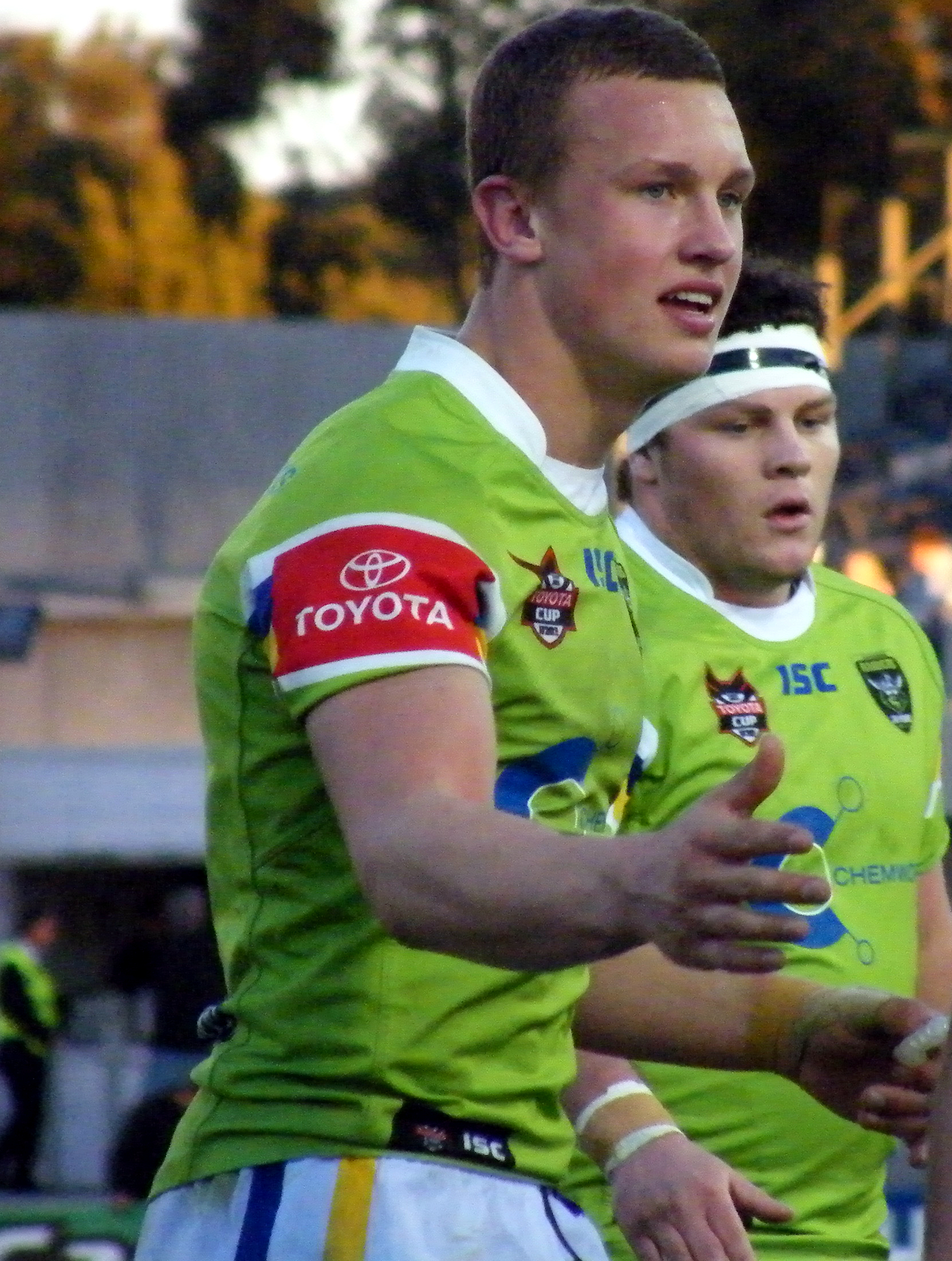
Jack Wighton playing for the Canberra Raiders U20s side in 2011

Wighton left his job as a brickie's labourer to pursue a career in football.

== Playing career ==
=== Early career ===
Wighton has represented NSW Under 18s and Australian Schoolboys in 2010.

Wighton played for the Raiders NYC team in 2011 before being promoted to the Raiders full-time NRL squad.

=== 2012 ===
In Round 2 of the 2012 NRL season, Wighton made his NRL debut for the Canberra Raiders against the Gold Coast Titans, having an impressive debut match on the wing in the Raiders 24–12 win at Robina Stadium. In round 6, against the New Zealand Warriors, Wighton scored his first NRL try in the Raiders 32–12 win at Canberra Stadium. On 30 May 2012, Wighton suffered a toe injury in a freak trampoline accident which resulted in him missing most of the year, until he made a return in the semi-final match against the South Sydney Rabbitohs in the Raiders 38–16 loss at ANZ Stadium. On 22 August 2012, Wighton extended his contract with the Raiders until the end of the 2014 season. Wighton finished his debut year in the NRL with him playing in 9 matches and scoring 2 tries for the Raiders in the 2012 NRL season.

=== 2013 ===
On 9 February 2013, Wighton was selected to play for the Indigenous All Stars off the interchange bench in the 32–6 win over the NRL All Stars team at Suncorp Stadium. Wighton was also selected to play for NSW Country at centre against NSW City in Country's 18–12 win in Coffs Harbour. Wighton finished the 2013 NRL season with him playing in 18 matches and scoring 4 tries for the Raiders. On 1 November 2013 Wighton re-signed with the Raiders until the end of 2016.

=== 2014 ===
Wighton started the season playing at five-eighth by incoming Raider coach Ricky Stuart. On 4 May 2014, Wighton played at centre for NSW Country against NSW City in the 26-26 all draw. In Round 10 against the Penrith Panthers, Wighton returned to his preferred centre position in the Raiders 26–20 loss at Canberra Stadium. Wighton played at centre until Round 24, when he was selected to play at fullback for a clash with the Cronulla-Sutherland Sharks. He had a successful match, helping the Raiders to a 22–12 win at Shark Park. Wighton had a successful end of the season at fullback for the Raiders. Wighton finished the 2014 NRL season having played in 20 matches and scored 6 tries. On 9 September 2014, Wighton was selected in the Australia Kangaroos 2014 Four Nations train-on squad but didn't make the final 24-man squad.

=== 2015 ===
On 13 February 2015, Wighton was selected on the interchange bench for the Indigenous All Stars in the 2015 All Stars match. The Indigenous side won 20–6 over the NRL All Stars at Robina Stadium.

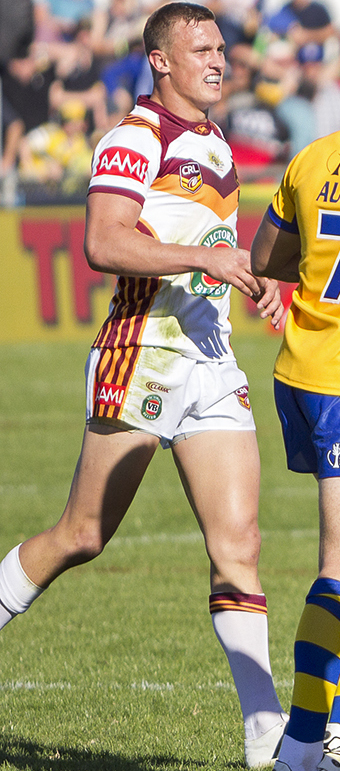
Wighton playing for Country in 2015

On 3 May 2015, Wighton played for New South Wales Country against New South Wales City in the 2015 City vs Country Origin match, playing at centre and scoring a try in Country's 34–22 win at Wagga Wagga. In Round 25 against the Penrith Panthers, Wighton was charged with a grade two careless high tackle after he blindsided Panthers halfback Jamie Soward, following a break downfield. The hit left Soward unconscious and he had to be assisted off the field on a stretcher during the Raiders 34–18 win at Canberra Stadium. He was later suspended for a match, missing out in the Raiders last match of the season. Wighton finished the 2015 NRL season having played in 20 matches and scoring 7 tries for the Raiders. On 26 September 2015, Wighton played for the Prime Minister's XIII against Papua New Guinea, scoring a try in the 40–12 win in Port Moresby.

=== 2016 ===
On 13 January 2016, Wighton was named in the emerging New South Wales Blues squad. On 13 February 2016, Wighton played for the Indigenous All Stars against the World All Stars, playing off the interchange bench in the 12–8 loss at Suncorp Stadium. On 8 May 2016, Wighton played for Country Origin against City Origin, where he played at fullback in the 44–30 loss in Tamworth. On 8 September 2016, Wighton was very lucky to escape a 3-week suspension for a shoulder charge in which he did on Wests Tigers player Joel Edwards in Round 26 in the 52-10 thumping win at Leichhardt Oval. The suspension could have ruled out Wighton from all the Raiders 3 finals matches and ended his season early. Wighton finished the 2016 NRL season with him playing 26 matches and scoring 8 tries for the Raiders.

=== 2017 ===
On 10 February 2017, Wighton played for the Indigenous All Stars against the World All Stars in the 2017 All Stars match, starting at fullback in the 34–8 win at Hunter Stadium. In Round 7 against the New Zealand Warriors, Wighton played his 100th NRL career match in the 20–8 win at Canberra Stadium. On 23 May 2017, Wighton extended his contract with the Raiders to the end of the 2020 season. Wighton finished the 2017 NRL season with him playing in 23 matches and scoring 7 tries for the Raiders.

=== 2018 ===
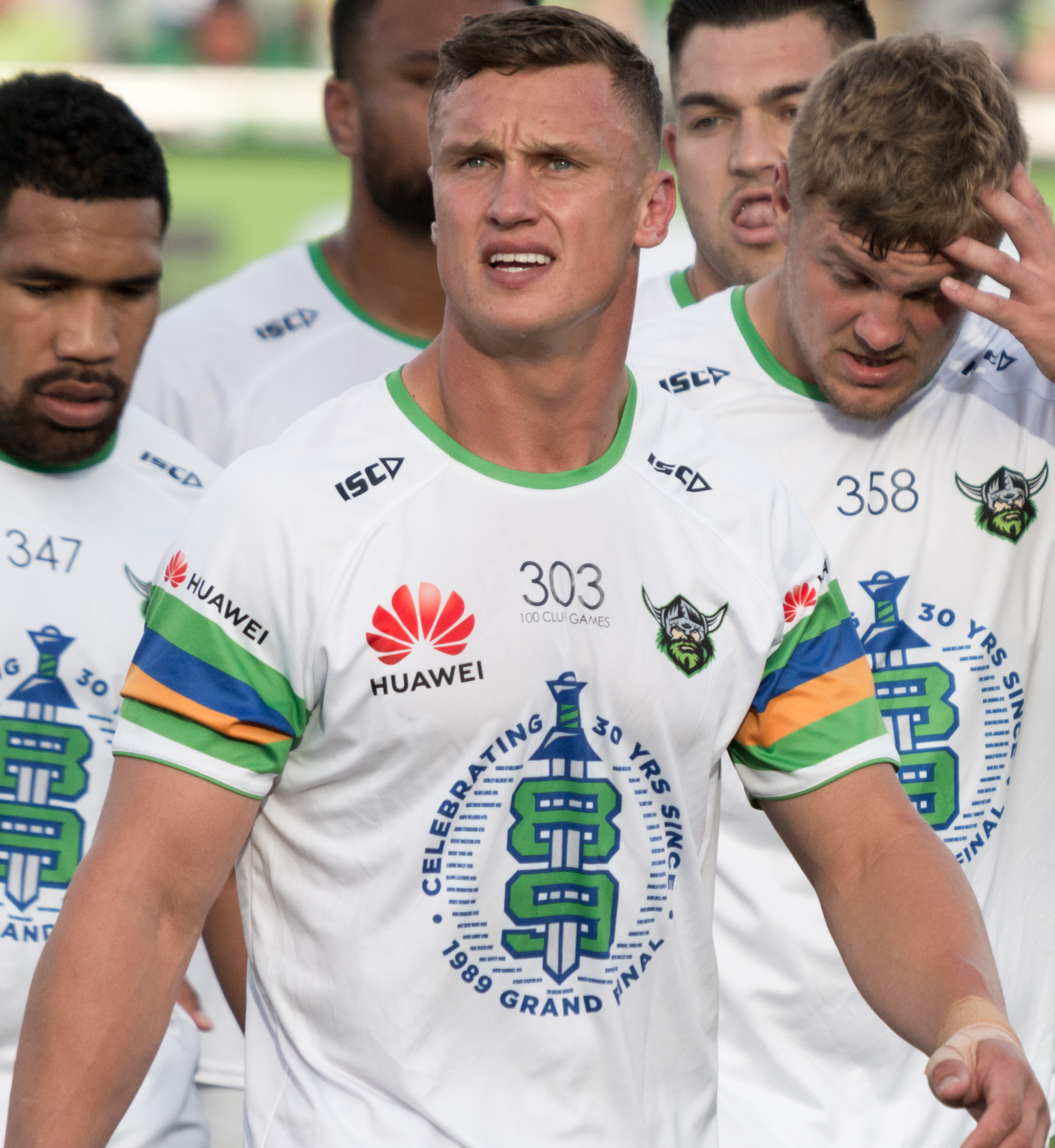
Wighton warming up for Canberra in 2019

On 28 June 2018, Wighton was stood down by Canberra after admitting in court to assault and urinating in public during a Canberra night out earlier in the year. On 9 July, Wighton was suspended by Canberra for six matches but elected not to terminate his contract regardless of the outcome of the court case hearing. On 13 July, The NRL who were unhappy with the suspension Canberra handed down to Wighton, increased his suspension to ten matches, which put him out for the rest of the season, plus a monetary fine of $30,000. Wighton ultimately avoided jail time.

He finished the 2018 NRL season having played in thirteen matches and scoring three tries.

=== 2019 ===
In round 5 of the 2019 NRL season against the Parramatta Eels, Wighton scored a try from a Sam Williams cross field kick in the 61st Minute to seal Canberra's fourth win of the season whilst also solidifying Wighton's position as five-eighth of the side.

On 5 June, Wighton made his State of Origin debut off the bench for New South Wales in game 1 of the 2019 State of Origin series at Suncorp Stadium. In the 56th minute, Wighton was interchanged for Cody Walker at five-eighth, he then went on to throw an intercept pass for Dane Gagai to run the length of the field and score in the 67th minute of the game. New South Wales would go on to lose the game 18–14.

On 16 June, Wighton was a shock selection at centre replacing Latrell Mitchell for New South Wales for game 2 in Perth. New South Wales went on to win the game 2 38–6.

On 10 July, Wighton was part of the Origin decider for New South Wales at left centre in which New South Wales won 26–20 at ANZ Stadium.

In round 22, Wighton played his 150th NRL game for Canberra in their 18–22 win over the Melbourne Storm at AAMI park. Wighton made a total of 26 appearances for Canberra as the club reached their first grand final in 25 years. In the 2019 NRL Grand Final against the Sydney Roosters, Wighton scored a try in the first half. Canberra would go on to lose the final 14–8 at ANZ Stadium. Wighton was awarded the Clive Churchill Medal after being voted man of the match, making him the fourth man to achieve this from a losing side, joining Canberra's Bradley Clyde (1991), St George's Brad Mackay (1993) and Manly's Daly Cherry-Evans (2013).

On 7 October, Wighton was named in the Australian side for the upcoming Oceania Cup fixtures.

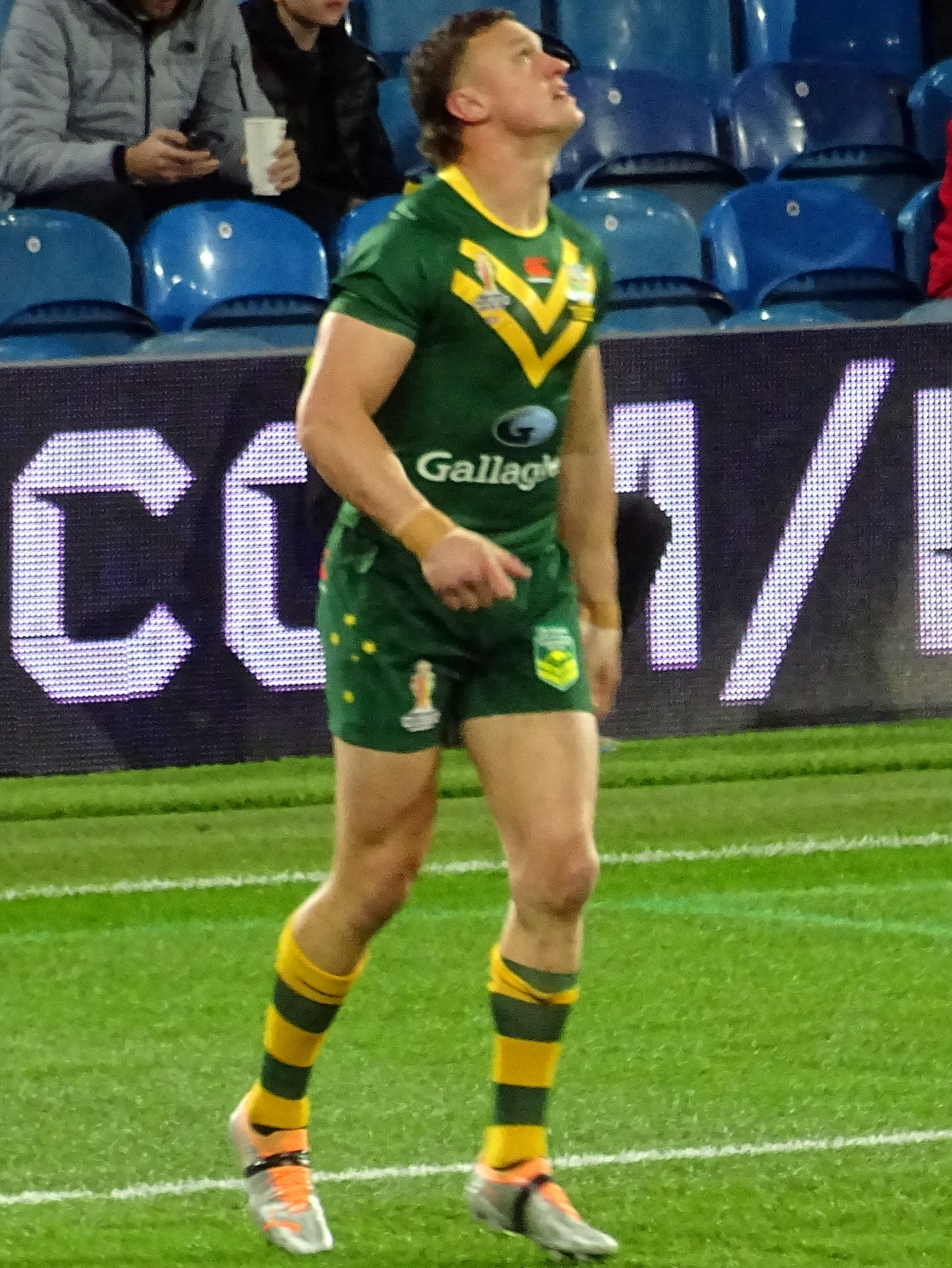
Wighton warming up for the Kangaroos at the 2021 RLWC

=== 2020 ===
In round 16 of the 2020 NRL season, Wighton scored two tries in a 34–20 victory over Canterbury-Bankstown at GIO Stadium.

In round 18 against St. George, he scored two tries in a 37–8 victory for Canberra at WIN Stadium.

Wighton was rewarded for a stellar home and away season by being named joint Meninga Medal winner with Josh Papalii, having finished on atop the voting for the club's player of the year award at a subdued in-house ceremony.

Wighton also took home the Dally M Medal as the NRL's player of the year after polling 26 votes to edge out Clint Gutherson and Nathan Cleary. There was controversy around the announcement after the Daily Telegraph published the results hours before the ceremony took place.

Wighton was selected for the 2020 State of Origin series but was played out of position in the centres by New South Wales coach Brad Fittler. Wighton played in all three games for New South Wales as they suffered a shock 2–1 defeat against Queensland.

=== 2021 ===
In round 10 of the 2021 NRL season, Wighton was sent to the sin bin after using an illegal cannonball tackle on Canterbury player Adam Elliott during the club's 20–18 victory.

On 30 May, Wighton was selected by New South Wales for game one of the 2021 State of Origin series despite his poor form at club level for Canberra.

Wighton played 21 games for Canberra in the 2021 NRL season which saw the club finish a disappointing 10th place on the table.

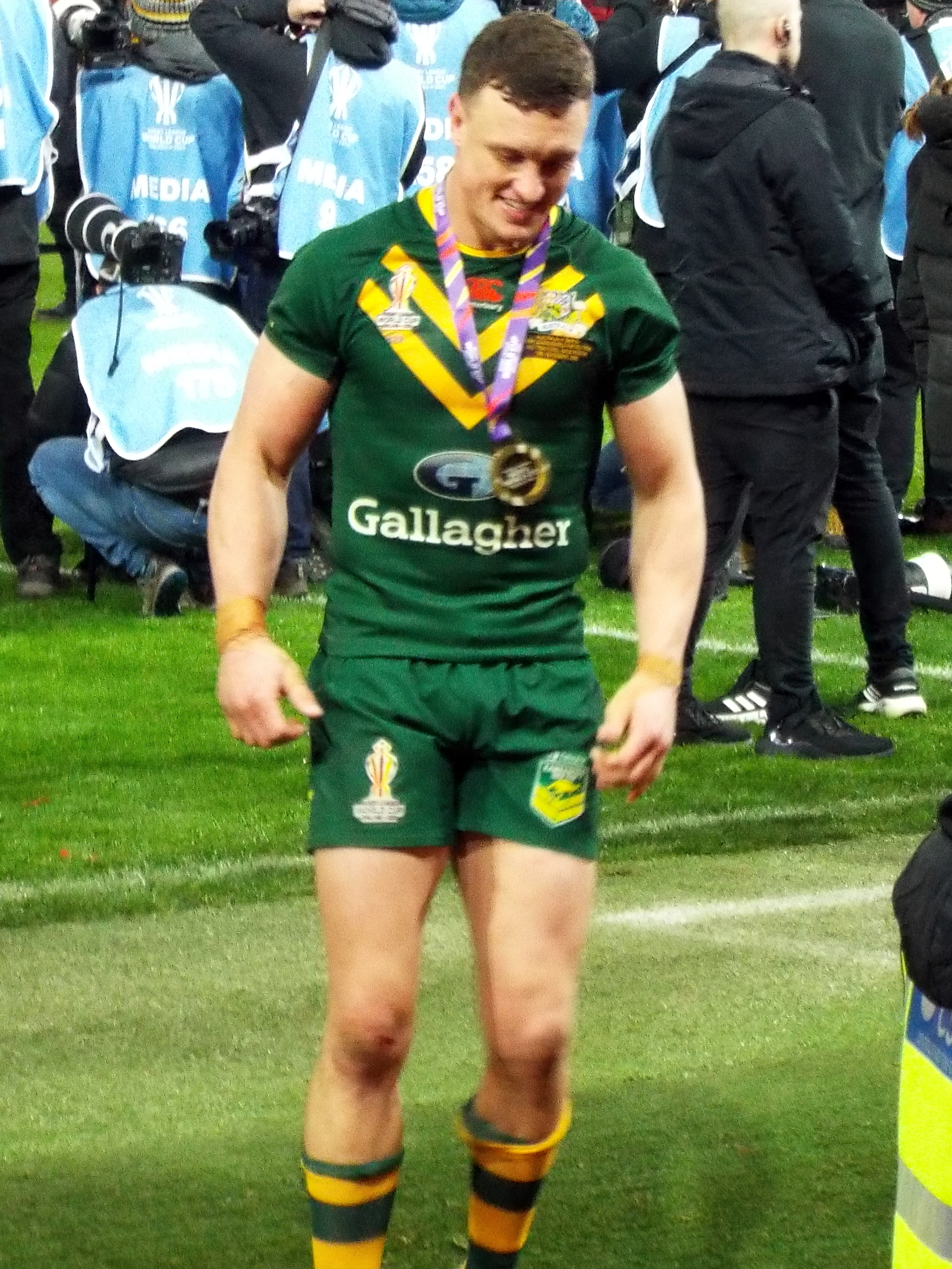
Wighton after Australia won the 2021 RLWC Final

=== 2022 ===
On 29 May, Wighton was selected by New South Wales to play in game one of the 2022 State of Origin series.

In October, he was named in the Australia squad for the 2021 Rugby League World Cup.

Wighton played for Australia in their 2021 Rugby League World Cup final victory over Samoa.

=== 2023 ===
On 5 February, it was alleged that Wighton who was out celebrating his 30th birthday became involved in a fight with South Sydney player and Australian teammate Latrell Mitchell. Witnesses saw the pair allegedly fight in the Canberra CBD outside a nightclub on Bunda Street at 3:45AM and called police. ACT Police subsequently charged Wighton with fighting in a public place and failing to comply with an exclusion direction. Wighton was ordered to attend ACT Magistrates Court on 22 February 2023 regarding the incident. He pleaded not guilty, and the case was adjourned to 30 October 2023.

In round 4 of the 2023 NRL season, Wighton scored a try and was also sent to the sin bin during Canberra's 24–14 loss against Newcastle. On 18 April, Wighton announced his retirement from representative rugby league. On 26 April, it was announced that Wighton had signed with South Sydney from 2024 on a four-year deal.

Wighton played his last game for Canberra in their 28-30 extra time elimination final loss to the Newcastle Knights. Placed on report for an alleged bite on Tyson Gamble but not penalised during the match, Wighton was later found guilty and suspended for three matches.

=== 2024 ===
In round 3 of the 2024 NRL season, Wighton made his club debut for South Sydney in their 48-6 loss against arch-rivals the Sydney Roosters. The following week, Wighton scored two tries for South Sydney in their 20-16 victory over Canterbury. In round 18, Wighton scored two tries for South Sydney in their 32-16 victory over Parramatta. Wighton played 21 games for South Sydney in his first season at the club as they finished second last on the table.

=== 2025 ===
On 29 July, Wighton was suspended for four matches after being placed on report during South Sydney's narrow 14-12 loss against Cronulla in round 21 of the 2025 NRL season. Wighton was limited to only 15 matches with South Sydney in the 2025 NRL season which saw the club finish 14th on the table.

=== 2026 ===
Wighton played 19 matches for South Sydney in the 2026 NRL season as the club finished 6th on the table and qualified for the finals.

== Honours ==
Individual

- Dally M Medal: 2020
- Clive Churchill Medal: 2019
- Dally M 5/8 of the Year: 2020

Canberra Raiders

- NRL Premiership Runners-Up: 2019

NSW Blues

- State of Origin: 2019, 2021

Australia

- Rugby League World Cup: 2021

== Statistics ==
| Year | Team | Games | Tries | Goals | Field goals | Pts |
|---|---|---|---|---|---|---|
| 2012 | Canberra Raiders | 9 | 2 | 0 | 0 | 8 |
| 2013 | Canberra Raiders | 18 | 4 | 0 | 0 | 16 |
| 2014 | Canberra Raiders | 20 | 6 | 0 | 0 | 24 |
| 2015 | Canberra Raiders | 21 | 7 | 0 | 0 | 28 |
| 2016 | Canberra Raiders | 26 | 8 | 0 | 0 | 32 |
| 2017 | Canberra Raiders | 23 | 7 | 0 | 0 | 28 |
| 2018 | Canberra Raiders | 13 | 3 | 0 | 0 | 12 |
| 2019 | Canberra Raiders | 26 | 9 | 0 | 0 | 36 |
| 2020 | Canberra Raiders | 22 | 13 | 0 | 0 | 52 |
| 2021 | Canberra Raiders | 21 | 5 | 0 | 0 | 20 |
| 2022 | Canberra Raiders | 21 | 4 | 0 | 0 | 16 |
| 2023 | Canberra Raiders | 22 | 7 | 0 | 0 | 28 |
| 2024 | South Sydney Rabbitohs | 21 | 6 | 0 | 0 | 24 |
| 2025 | South Sydney Rabbitohs | 15 | 6 | 0 | 0 | 24 |
| 2026 | South Sydney Rabbitohs | 13 | 3 | 0 | 0 | 12 |
| | Totals | 291 | 90 | 0 | 0 | 360 |

== Assault charges ==
In February 2018, Wighton assaulted five people outside a nightclub while celebrating his birthday in Canberra, and was charged for a number of offences including assault and public urination, which he initially pleaded not guilty to until prosecutors said they were prepared to produce CCTV evidence. In June, Wighton pleaded guilty to six charges in the ACT Magistrates Court, including assault and public urination, while prosecutors dropped the remaining charges. In July, Wighton was suspended by the Raiders for six matches, but the club confirmed his contract would not be terminated. After viewing the CCTV footage, the NRL extended his suspension until the end of the season, and fined him $30,000. On 14 November, Wighton received a two-month suspended sentence and a $3,500 fine. Magistrate Bernadette Boss noted his positive character references and existing punishment from the NRL. Following sentencing, the footage of Wighton in urine-soaked trousers launching unprovoked attacks on five different passers-by was released to the media.
