= Dally M Awards =

National Rugby League awards

The Dally M Awards are the official annual player awards for the National Rugby League competition. As well as honouring the player of the year, who received the Dally M Medal, awards are also given to the premier player in each position, the best coach, the best captain, representative player of the year and the most outstanding rookie of the season. The awards are named in honour of Australian former rugby league great Herbert Henry "Dally" Messenger.

== History ==
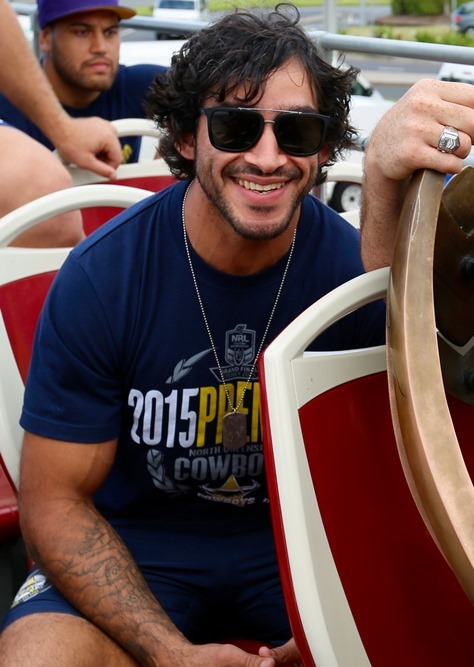
Johnathan Thurston, the winner of the most Dally M "Player of the Year" medals, with four

The awards were introduced in 1979 by News Limited with the ex-gratia permission of the Messenger family. As sports historian Ian Heads wrote –

In 1940, when Truth newspaper profiled his (Dally's) career and life in a 14-part series, the paper called him “the greatest player of all time ….genius of Rugby football of either code”, continuing: ”around him as the keystone in the arch, the code of rugby league in Australia was built.” Harry Sunderland, a towering, entrepreneurial figure of the game wrote: “Without Messenger’s magical appeal….there would be no league.” It is as stark as that: without Dally there may well have been no rugby league at all.

News Limited journalists vote on the best performing players in each match on a 3, 2, 1 point(s) system. The scores of the voting are visible to the public and media up until Round 16 of the NRL season. In 1998, following the merger of the Super League and the Australian Rugby League (ARL), the awards became the official awards of the newly formed National Rugby League. Prior to 1998, the official award of the game was voted on by the referees and were known as the Rothmans Medal from 1968 to 1996 and the Nokia Provan–Summons Medal in 1997. Today the Provan–Summons Medal is for the fans' "people's choice" player of the year.

Between 1979 and 1996, when both the Dally M Medal and Rothmans Medal were awarded, the same player won both awards on only three occasions – Peter Sterling in 1987, Gavin Miller in 1989 and Ricky Stuart in 1993.

In 1997, when the game was split between the News Limited-organised Super League competition and the ARL, News Limited did not hold the awards.

The only other time the awards night has not been held was in 2003, following a dispute with the Rugby League Players Association (RLPA). After the players had threatened to boycott the event unless the NRL met their demands, the NRL cancelled the Dally M awards two days prior to the ceremony. Craig Gower would have been named player of the year had the awards not been cancelled. Gower was subsequently awarded the inaugural RLPA Players Player Medal in recognition of his 2003 NRL season exploits, and his central role in the dispute that saw the creation of the game's first overarching workplace agreement 8 months after the boycott.

The 2014 Dally M Medal was held on 29 September 2014 and was won jointly by Jarryd Hayne and Johnathan Thurston of the North Queensland Cowboys. It was the first time the medal has been won jointly since its inception.

== Dally M recent results ==
- 2004 Dally M Awards
- 2005 Dally M Awards
- 2006 Dally M Awards
- 2007 Dally M Awards
- 2008 Dally M Awards
- 2009 Dally M Awards
- 2010 Dally M Awards
- 2011 Dally M Awards
- 2012 Dally M Awards
- 2013 Dally M Awards
- 2014 Dally M Awards
- 2015 Dally M Awards
- 2016 Dally M Awards
- 2017 Dally M Awards
- 2018 Dally M Awards
- 2019 Dally M Awards
- 2020 Dally M Awards
- 2021 Dally M Awards
- 2022 Dally M Awards
- 2023 Dally M Awards
- 2024 Dally M Awards
- 2025 Dally M Awards
- 2026 Dally M Awards

== See also ==
- Dally M Medal
- List of Dally M Awards Winners
- Clive Churchill Medal
- Karyn Murphy Medal
