= Peter Frilingos =

Australian sports journalist (1944–2004)

Peter Frilingos (1944–2004), also known as Chippy, was an Australian sports journalist and commentator of Greek descent, best known for his work as a rugby league writer. He started his career in journalism in February 1962 at the Sydney Daily Mirror, and within two years, wrote his first piece on rugby league.

Frilingos soon became one of the leading rugby league writers in Sydney. In 1996 he transferred to the Daily Telegraph. His reporting methods and integrity came under severe scrutiny during the Super League war. While Frilingos originally supported the ARL, he had begun openly endorsing Super League after a closed door meeting with News Limited management. This led to him being branded News Limited's "Chief Toady" by Media Watch.

In August 2019, Frilingos was inducted into the National Rugby League Hall of Fame, and there is an award named after him in the National Rugby League's Dally M Medal, called the 'Peter Frilingos Memorial Award'.

He met his wife Maureen in 1971. They had three children: Matt, Anna, and Alison. Matt is a journalist and nicknamed "Junior Chippy." Alison was a cellist in the Australian World Orchestra when Frilingos died. Since 2016, Alison Frilingos has been a member of the Vienna Chamber Orchestra, and she teaches cello at the Anton Stadler Musikschule in Bruck an der Leitha.
