= Danny Buderus =

Australian rugby league footballer

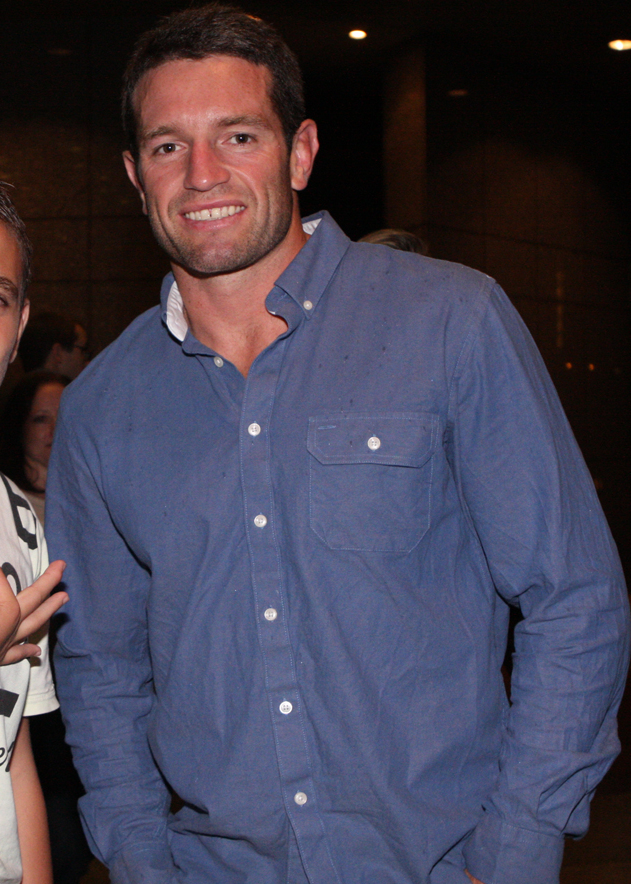

Personal information
- Born: 6 February 1978 (age 48) Taree, New South Wales, Australia

Playing information
- Height: 185 cm (6 ft 1 in)
- Weight: 96 kg (15 st 2 lb)
- Position: Hooker
Club
Years	Team	Pld	T	G	FG	P
1997–08	Newcastle Knights	220	58	0	0	232
2009–11	Leeds Rhinos	82	15	0	0	60
2012–13	Newcastle Knights	37	3	1	0	14
	Total	339	76	1	0	306
Representative
Years	Team	Pld	T	G	FG	P
2001–08	NSW Country	5	1	0	0	4
2002–08	New South Wales	21	2	0	0	8
2001–06	Australia	24	2	0	0	8
2011	Exiles	1	0	0	0	0

Coaching information
Club
Years	Team	Gms	W	D	L	W%
2015	Newcastle Knights	6	2	0	4	33

Danny Buderus (born 6 February 1978) is an Australian rugby league commentator, coach and former professional footballer who played in the 1990s, 2000s and 2010s. An Australian international and New South Wales State of Origin representative hooker, he played in the National Rugby League for Australian club, the Newcastle Knights, with whom he won a Dally M Medal, and the 2001 NRL Premiership before setting a new record for most games with the club. Buderus also played in the Super League for English club, the Leeds Rhinos, with whom he won 2011's Super League XVI. He set the record for most appearances as captain of the New South Wales State of Origin team at 15 and for most consecutive appearances for the side at 21. Buderus also played representative football for the Exiles and New South Wales Country. In 2015, he took up an interim coaching role with the Knights and continued as an assistant coach in 2016.

== Background ==
Buderus was born in Taree, New South Wales, Australia.

He played his junior football for Taree Red Rovers and played 1 season for Taree United. In 1995, while attending St Francis Xavier's College, Hamilton, Buderus played for the Australian Schoolboys team. Other players to also come through this well-known rugby league nursery under the tutelage of Mark Wright include Owen Craigie, Jarrod Mullen, Paul Dan and Anthony Tupou.

== Professional playing career ==
=== Newcastle Knights ===
In Round 3 of the 1997 ARL season Buderus made his ARL début for the Newcastle Knights against the South Queensland Crushers. Buderus scored his first try in first-grade in 1998 against the Auckland Warriors in Round 7 of the 1998 NRL season. In 2001, Buderus was selected for Country Origin in the annual City vs Country Origin match. In 2001, Buderus made his international début for Australia against New Zealand. Buderus played hooker in the Knights' 2001 NRL Grand Final win over the Parramatta Eels, the Knights winning 30–24. Having won the 2001 NRL Premiership, the Knights travelled to England to play the 2002 World Club Challenge against Super League champions, the Bradford Bulls. Buderus played at hooker, and scored a try in Newcastle's loss. He made his State of Origin début for New South Wales in 2002. Buderus played his 100th NRL game in Round 14 of the 2002 NRL season against the Parramatta Eels. In 2002, Buderus was named the Dally M Hooker of the Year and Dally M Representative Player of the Year at the Dally M Awards at the end of the regular season. Buderus played a pivotal role in Newcastle making the semi-finals again in 2003 and ended the season again named Hooker of the Year.

In 2004, Buderus was awarded the 2004 Dally M Medal for the Player of the Year, only the second hooker to be awarded the medal after Mal Cochrane as well as the 2004 Hooker of the Year. Buderus was selected in the Australian team to go and compete in the end of season 2004 Rugby League Tri-Nations tournament. In the final against Great Britain he played at hooker in the Kangaroos' 44–4 victory. In 2005 Buderus again won the Hooker of the Year award. On 13 March 2008, Buderus signed a 2-year contract with the Leeds Rhinos starting in 2009. In August 2008, Buderus was named in the preliminary 46-man Kangaroos squad for the 2008 Rugby League World Cup despite comments by Kangaroos' coach, Ricky Stuart, that he would not select players leaving Australia to play in England in 2009. However Buderus wasn't selected to play in a game.

=== Leeds Rhinos ===
Buderus commenced playing in the Super League for English club the Leeds Rhinos in 2009. He re-signed with the Rhinos on a 2-year contract during 2010.

He played in the 2010 Challenge Cup Final defeat by the Warrington Wolves at Wembley Stadium.

In 2011, Buderus played hooker for the Leeds Rhinos in their 2011 Challenge Cup Final defeat by the Wigan Warriors at Wembley Stadium.

On 10 June 2011, Buderus was selected in the Exiles squad for the International Origin match against England at Headingley while playing for the Leeds Rhinos of the Super League. He also captained the side to a victory.

In 2011, Buderus played hooker for Leeds in their 2011 Super League Grand Final win over St Helens, with Leeds winning 30–16 at Old Trafford, in which was his final game for the club.

After new Newcastle Knights coach Wayne Bennett requested Buderus' services, Buderus signed a 1-year contract on 1 October 2011 with the Newcastle Knights starting in 2012, returning to the club he had played 220 games for. He had been released from the final year of his Leeds Rhinos contract to sign with Newcastle.

=== Return to Newcastle ===
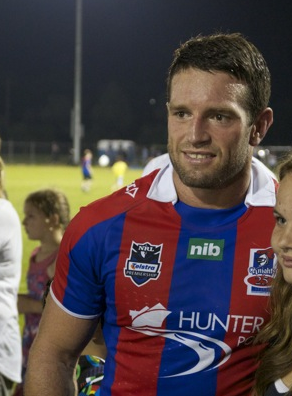
Buderus playing for the Knights in 2012

In 2012, 7 weeks into his return to the National Rugby League, Buderus was again selected for Country Origin at starting hooker, however he withdrew due to injury. Later in the year there was speculation he would be named at hooker for New South Wales in Game 1 of the 2012 State of Origin series but was injured and didn't get picked, Robbie Farah was instead picked and retained his spot for the rest of the series. On 12 June 2012, Buderus re-signed with the Knights on a 1-year contract, 14 rounds into the 2012 season.

In September 2013, Buderus announced his retirement at the end of the 2013 NRL season. During the Knights vs Roosters Preliminary Final, Buderus entered a tackle and made contact with the elbow of Jared Waerea-Hargreaves, knocking him out. This saw Buderus stretchered from the field, ending his career. However, later scans in hospital cleared the retiring hooker of any serious head or neck injuries.

== Accolades ==
=== Individual ===
- Dally M Player of the Year: 2004
- 3x Dally M Hooker of the Year: 2002, 2004, 2005
- Dally M Representative Player of the Year: 2002
- RLPA Player of the Year: 2004
- Brad Fittler Medal: 2009
- National Rugby League Hall of Fame inductee: #110 2019

== Coaching career ==
Buderus stayed with the Knights as an assistant coach for 2014. In July 2015, Buderus was made interim head coach, following the sacking of Rick Stone. After the 2016 season, he chose to leave his role as an assistant coach. He served as pathways coach in 2017. Buderus was also a selector for the NSW Blues helping select the series winning side along with Greg Alexander and former Knights teammate and Rugby League Immortal Andrew Johns. On 28 September 2023, Buderus was informed by the NSWRL board that his contract would not be renewed for the following season after New South Wales suffered another series loss.

On 15 October 2025, the Knights confirmed Buderus had re-joined the Knights in an assistant coaching role.

== Personal life ==
Buderus is founder and co-owner of Steel City Beer Company with Andrew Johns, Matthew Johns, Kurt Gidley and Matt Hoy.

== Sources ==
- NRL profile
- (archived by web.archive.org) 2013 Newcastle Knights profile
- 2001 Ashes profile

Preceded by Darren Lockyer	Captain Australia; 2004–2005	Succeeded by Craig Gower
