= Narrow World of Sports =

- Also known as: The Professor's Second Year Syndrome; The Professor's Farewell Tour; The Professor's Late Hit
- Genre: Sport
- Starring: James Rochford; Andrew Barnett; Nathan Hindmarsh; Emma Lawrence
- Country of origin: Australia
- Original language: English
- No. of seasons: 4
- No. of episodes: 85

Production
- Camera setup: Multiple-camera setup
- Running time: 30 minutes (including commercials)

Original release
- Network: Fox Sports
- Release: 2017 – 2020

Related
- The Night Watchmen

Narrow World of Sports (previously titled The Professor's Second Year Syndrome, The Professor's Farewell Tour and The Professor's Late Hit) was an Australian sports television show broadcast on Fox League on Friday nights at the conclusion of the nights NRL fixture. The show was co-hosted by James "The Professor" Rochford and Andrew "Barney" Barnett, who were joined each week by former rugby league footballer Nathan Hindmarsh, along with 10 News First journalist Emma Lawrence. The show took a satirical look at controversies and issues in rugby league.

In December 2018, James Rochford (brother of the well-liked, and more successful Andrew Rochford) and co-host Andrew Barnett started presenting a spin-off show titled The Night Watchmen that aired on Fox Cricket during the 2018-19 cricket season.

Production of the show was ceased after one episode in 2020 as COVID-19 restrictions prevented studio audiences from attending the recordings.

== Presenters ==
- James "The Professor" Rochford (main host and forever living in the shadow of his brother Dr Andrew Rochford, 2017–2020)
- Andrew "Barney" Barnett (The NRL Store infomercials 2018, co-host 2019–2020)
- Nathan Hindmarsh (regular appearances 2017, co-host 2018–2020)
- Emma Lawrence (news reporter, 2018–2020)

== Regular appearances ==
- Brett Finch (co-host, 2017-2018)
- Chris "Pagey" Page (co-host and barman, 2017-2018)
- Bryan Fletcher
- Emma Freedman
- John Hopoate
- Matthew Johns (as himself and as character Mighty Mick Matherson)
- Steven Menzies
- Herman Mose (security guard)
- Sam Taunton
- Tommy Tuxedo

== History ==
The show was announced as part of the 2017 Fox League line-up of programming at the official launch of the channel at Birchgrove Oval, Balmain on 15 February 2017. The show premiered on Friday 3 March 2017 at approximately 10pm following the South Sydney Rabbitohs vs West Tigers NRL fixture.

Rochford was a regular on Monday Night with Matty Johns in the years prior to the shows premiere, presenting the weekly Not The NRL News segment - a satirical look at the week in NRL. The show is described as being "Not The NRL News on steroids".

The first season of the program, broadcast in 2017, was titled The Professor's Second Year Syndrome. However, the show changed its title to The Professor's Farewell Tour for its second season in 2018. The premise and content of the program however have remained much the same as the previous year.

In 2017, The Professor's Second Year Syndrome was broadcast live to air. However, in 2018 the show is pre-recorded with any swearing censored.

For the 2019 season, the title of the show was changed to The Professor's Late Hit, and adopted a similar format to their cricket-related show The Night Watchmen, whereby each episode featured a special guest, whose career was reflected upon.

For the 2020 season, the show was renamed to Narrow World of Sports, a play on words with Nine's Wide World of Sports.

== Series overview ==
Season	Episodes	Originally aired	
Season	Episodes	First aired	Last aired
1	30	3 March 2017	28 September 2017
2	28	9 March 2018	21 September 2018
3	28	15 March 2019	27 September 2019
4	1	13 March 2020	13 March 2020

== Episodes ==
=== Season 1 (2017) - The Professor's Second Year Syndrome ===
Note: All episodes feature James Rochford, Brett Finch and Chris Page, unless otherwise noted.

No. overall	No. in season	Title	Original release date	Australian overnight viewers
1	1	"Episode 1"	3 March 2017	132,000
Guests: Matthew Johns, Billy Moore
2	2	"Episode 2"	10 March 2017	286,000
Guests: Andrew Rochford, Michael Crocker
3	3	"Episode 3"	17 March 2017	127,000
Guest: Wade Graham
4	4	"Episode 4"	24 March 2017	108,000
Guests: Nathan Hindmarsh, Jake Friend
5	5	"Episode 5"	31 March 2017	143,000
Guest: Steven Menzies
6	6	"Episode 6"	7 April 2017	85,000
Guests: Bryan Fletcher, Andrew Rochford
7	7	"Episode 7"	14 April 2017	110,000
Guests: Mark Gasnier, Corey Norman
8	8	"Episode 8"	21 April 2017	197,000
Guests: Paul Vaughan, John Hopoate, Nathan Hindmarsh
9	9	"Episode 9"	28 April 2017	101,000
Guest: Jamal Idris
10	10	"Episode 10"	12 May 2017	83,000
Guests: Bryan Fletcher, John Hopoate, Nathan Ross
11	11	"Episode 11"	19 May 2017	103,000
Guests: Matthew Johns, Nick Cummins, Wade Graham
12	12	"Episode 12"	26 May 2017	74,000
Guests: Bob Katter, John Hopoate, Darcy Lussick, Curtis Sironen
13	13	"Episode 13"	2 June 2017	81,000
Guest: Andrew Voss
14	14	"Episode 14"	9 June 2017	93,000
Guests: Steven Menzies, Andrew Fifita
N–A	N–A	"Mid-Season Best Of Special"	16 June 2017	68,000
Note: This episode contained highlights from the previous 14 episodes of the show.
15	15	"Episode 15"	23 June 2017	64,000
Guests: Nathan Ross, Josh McGuire, James Segeyaro, John Hopoate
16	16	"Episode 16"	30 June 2017	98,000
Guests: Nathan Hindmarsh, Braith Anasta, Matt Shirvington
17	17	"Episode 17"	7 July 2017	72,000
Guests: Yvonne Sampson, Ruan Sims, Tariq Sims
18	18	"Episode 18"	14 July 2017	82,000
Christmas In July Special; Guests: Steven Menzies, John Hopoate, Dylan Walker, Curtis Sironen
19	19	"Episode 19"	21 July 2017	69,000
Guests: Corey Norman, Matthew Johns
20	20	"Episode 20"	28 July 2017	92,000
Guests: Eric Grothe Jr., Jordan Rapana
21	21	"Episode 21"	4 August 2017	83,000
Retro Round Special; Guests: Greg Alexander, Trent Merrin
22	22	"Episode 22"	11 August 2017	86,000
Guests: Mark Gasnier, Matt Shirvington; Note: The Professor and Pagey were absent from the episode, and were replaced by Andrew Voss as host and Bryan Fletcher behind the bar.
23	23	"Episode 23"	18 August 2017	80,000
Guests: Gorden Tallis, Konrad Hurrell; Note: Pagey was absent from the episode, and was replaced by Nathan Hindmarsh behind the bar.
24	24	"Episode 24"	25 August 2017	91,000
On The Couch With Professor; Guests: Ryan Girdler, Clint Gutherson, Andrew Rochford
25	25	"Episode 25"	1 September 2017	100,000
Guests: Phil Rothfield, Paul Kent
26	26	"Episode 26"	8 September 2017	37,000
The Professor 365; Guests: Lara Pitt, Matt Shirvington
27	27	"Episode 27"	15 September 2017	72,000
Tommy Tuxedo's Funeral; Guest: Andrew Voss
28	28	"Episode 28"	22 September 2017	58,000
Guests: Reagan Campbell-Gillard, Steven Menzies
N–A	N–A	"Best of 2017"	28 September 2017	N/A
Best Of 2017 Special; Note: This 1-hour long episode aired on a Thursday night at 9.30pm following the final episode of The Late Show with Matty Johns for 2017.

=== Season 2 (2018) - The Professor's Farewell Tour ===
Note: All episodes feature James Rochford, Brett Finch, Chris Page, Nathan Hindmarsh and Emma Lawrence, unless otherwise noted.

No. overall	No. in season	Title	Original release date	Australian overnight viewers
29	1	"Episode 1"	9 March 2018	136,000
Guest: James Graham
30	2	"Episode 2"	16 March 2018	167,000
Guests: Chad Townsend, Emma Freedman; Note: Brett Finch was absent from this episode.
31	3	"Episode 3"	23 March 2018	150,000
Guests: Nathan Ross, Connor Watson
32	4	"Episode 4"	30 March 2018	131,000
Guest: Josh Hodgson
33	5	"Episode 5"	6 April 2018	88,000
Guest: Trent Merrin
34	6	"Episode 6"	13 April 2018	122,000
Guest: Chris Lawrence; Note: Pagey was absent from this episode, and was replaced by Emma Freedman.
35	7	"Episode 7"	20 April 2018	101,000
Guest: Bryan Fletcher; Note: Brett Finch was absent from this episode.
36	8	"Episode 8"	27 April 2018	170,000
Guest: Will Chambers
37	9	"Episode 9"	4 May 2018	125,000
Star Wars Day Special; Guest: Josh Reynolds
38	10	"Episode 10"	11 May 2018	93,000
Guest: Gavin Cooper; Note: Brett Finch was absent from this episode, and was replaced by Bryan Fletcher.
39	11	"Episode 11"	18 May 2018	140,000
Guests: Brett Morris, Josh Morris; Note: Nathan Hindmarsh was absent from this episode, and was replaced by Emma Freedman.
40	12	"Episode 12"	25 May 2018	78,000
Guest: Apisai Koroisau
41	13	"Episode 13"	1 June 2018	82,000
Guest: Ethan Lowe
42	14	"Episode 14"	8 June 2018	109,000
Guest: Jason Nightingale; Note: Brett Finch was absent from this episode, and was replaced by Emma Freedman.
43	15	"Episode 15"	15 June 2018	115,000
Guest: Angus Crichton
44	16	"Episode 16"	29 June 2018	91,000
Guest: Andrew Voss; Note: Nathan Hindmarsh was absent from this episode.
45	17	"Episode 17"	6 July 2018	77,000
Guests: Alex Johnston, Chris Heighington; Note: Emma Lawrence was absent from this episode.
46	18	"Episode 18"	13 July 2018	98,000
Guests: Robbie Farah, Todd Carney; Note: Emma Lawrence was absent from this episode.
47	19	"Episode 19"	20 July 2018	124,000
2048 Special; Guests: Mark Gasnier, Reagan Campbell-Gillard; Note: Brett Finch was absent from this episode.
48	20	"Episode 20"	27 July 2018	90,000
Retro Round Special; Guests: Greg Alexander, Agro; Note: Brett Finch was absent from this episode.
49	21	"Episode 21"	3 August 2018	122,000
Guest: Akmal Saleh
50	22	"Episode 22"	10 August 2018	162,000
Guests: Justin Hodges, Chris Lawrence, Wade Graham; Note: Pagey was absent from this episode, and was replaced by Emma Freedman.
51	23	"Episode 23"	17 August 2018	118,000
Guest: Arj Barker
52	24	"Episode 24"	24 August 2018	128,000
Guests: Phil Rothfield, Paul Kent; Note: This episode is the last appearance from Emma Lawrence for 2018 due to her signing with Network Ten.
53	25	"Episode 25"	31 August 2018	142,000
Guests: George Burgess, Tom Burgess, Steven Menzies
54	26	"Episode 26"	7 September 2018	66,000
Mad Monday Special; Guests: Ben Ikin, Emma Freedman
55	27	"Episode 27"	14 September 2018	68,000
Guests: Chris Heighington, Ronnie Palmer
56	28	"Episode 28"	21 September 2018	53,000
Guest: Matt Shirvington

=== Season 3 (2019) - The Professor's Late Hit ===
Note: All episodes feature James Rochford, Andrew Barnett, Nathan Hindmarsh and Emma Lawrence, unless otherwise noted.

No. overall	No. in season	Title	Original release date	Australian overnight viewers
57	1	"Episode 1"	15 March 2019	132,000
Guest: Geoff Toovey
58	2	"Episode 2"	22 March 2019	77,000
Guest: Nathan Brown
59	3	"Episode 3"	29 March 2019	99,000
Guest: Sam Burgess
60	4	"Episode 4"	5 April 2019	151,000
Guests: Bryan Fletcher and Mark Bosnich
61	5	"Episode 5"	12 April 2019	138,000
Game of Thrones Special; Guest: Steven Menzies
62	6	"Episode 6"	19 April 2019	194,000
Guest: Benji Marshall
63	7	"Episode 7"	26 April 2019	137,000
Guest: Brett Finch
64	8	"Episode 8"	3 May 2019	132,000
Guest: Bill Harrigan
65	9	"Episode 9"	10 May 2019	154,000
Guest: Brett Morris
66	10	"Episode 10"	17 May 2019	135,000
Guest: Laurie Daley
67	11	"Episode 11"	24 May 2019	128,000
Guest: Nathan Peats
68	12	"Episode 12"	31 May 2019	117,000
Guest: Matthew Johns; Note: Emma Lawrence was absent from this episode.
69	13	"Episode 13"	7 June 2019	112,000
Guest: James Graham
70	14	"Episode 14"	14 June 2019	165,000
Guest: Boyd Cordner
71	15	"Episode 15"	28 June 2019	108,000
Guest: Robbie Farah
72	16	"Episode 16"	5 July 2019	84,000
Guests: John Bateman and Josh Hodgson
73	17	"Episode 17"	12 July 2019	147,000
Guests: Andrew Voss and Scott Donald
74	18	"Episode 18"	19 July 2019	95,000
Guest: Michael Ennis
75	19	"Episode 19"	26 July 2019	99,000
Guest: Corey Parker
76	20	"Episode 20"	2 August 2019	75,000
Guest: Gavin Cooper
77	21	"Episode 21"	9 August 2019	98,000
Retro Round Special; Guest: Luke Lewis
78	22	"Episode 22"	16 August 2019	83,000
Guests: Tallisha Harden and Kirra Dibb; Note: Emma Lawrence was absent from this episode.
79	23	"Episode 23"	23 August 2019	130,000
Guest: Marty Sheargold
80	24	"Episode 24"	30 August 2019	128,000
Guest: Jeremy Latimore
81	25	"Episode 25"	6 September 2019	94,000
Hindy's 40th Birthday; Guests: Andrew Ryan, Luke Burt and Nathan Cayless
82	26	"Episode 26"	13 September 2019	31,000
Guest: Danny Buderus
83	27	"Episode 27"	20 September 2019	62,000
Guest: Gorden Tallis
84	28	"Episode 28"	27 September 2019	99,000
Best of 2019 Special

=== Season 4 (2020) - Narrow World of Sports ===
Note: Production of the show was ceased after one episode as COVID-19 restrictions prevented studio audiences from attending the recordings.

No. overall	No. in season	Title	Original release date	Australian overnight viewers
85	1	"Episode 1"	13 March 2020	137,000
Guests: James Rochford, Andrew Barnett, Nick Rado and Emma Lawrence; Note: There was no studio audience present for the recording of this episode.

== See also ==
- List of Australian television series
