= 2016 Dally M Awards =

Rugby League awards

- Date: 28 September
- Location: The Star Sydney
- Hosted by: Tony Squires
- Dally M Medal: Cooper Cronk; Jason Taumalolo

Television/radio coverage
- Network: Fox Sports

The 2016 Dally M Awards were presented on Wednesday 28 September 2016. They are the official annual awards of the National Rugby League and are named after Dally Messenger. Cooper Cronk and Jason Taumalolo became just the second joint winners of the Dally M Medal after both players tied with 26 votes apiece.

== Judges ==
Judges are usually ex-players which have an involvement in that game such as commentary. Such judges in 2016 included Brad Fittler, Darren Lockyer and Braith Anasta

== Dally M Medal ==
Player votes tally – Top 10
| Points | Player |
|---|---|
| 26 | Cooper Cronk |
| 26 | Jason Taumalolo |
| 22 | Johnathan Thurston |
| 22 | Cameron Smith |
| 19 | Ryan James |
| 19 | Anthony Milford |
| 18 | Josh Hodgson |
| 18 | Mitchell Moses |
| 17 | Corey Norman |
| 17 | Ben Barba |

== Dally M Awards ==
The Dally M Awards are, as usual, conducted at the close of the regular season and do not take games played in the finals series into account. The Dally M Medal is for the official player of the year while the Provan-Summons Medal is for the fans' of "people's favourite" player of the year.

Awards
| Award | Player |
|---|---|
| Provan-Summons Medal | Jarrod Croker |
| Peter Moore Award for Rookie of the Year | Ashley Taylor |
| Captain of the Year | Jarrod Croker |
| Representative Player of the Year | Cameron Smith |
| Coach of the Year | Ricky Stuart |
| Top Tryscorer of the Year | Suliasi Vunivalu – 22 |
| Top Pointscorer of the Year | Jarrod Croker – 276 |
| Peter Frilingos Memorial Award for Headline Moment of the Year | Anthony Milford, golden point field goal vs North Queensland, Round 4 |
| Holden Cup Player of the Year | Jayden Brailey |
| Female Player of the Year | Kezie Apps |

Team of the Year
| Award | Player |
|---|---|
| Best Fullback | James Tedesco |
| Best Winger | Josh Mansour |
| Best Centre | Joseph Leilua |
| Best Five-Eighth | James Maloney |
| Best Halfback | Cooper Cronk |
| Best Lock | Jason Taumalolo |
| Best Second-Rower | Matt Gillett |
| Best Prop | Jesse Bromwich |
| Best Hooker | Cameron Smith |

== Presenters ==
=== Pre-Dally M Presentation ===
==== Monday Night with Matty Johns crew ====
The following people are from Fox Sports (Australia)'s Monday Night With Matty Johns. They performed their show 'live on the red carpet' instead of on their regular Monday night.

- Matthew Johns
- Nathan Hindmarsh
- Gorden Tallis
- Bryan Fletcher
- Jamie Rogers (from Sportsbet)
- Lara Pitt
- 'Professor' James Rochford

==== On the red carpet interviews ====
Through Matty Johns' show, regular interviews occurred between the following presenters and a number of players arriving with their partners.

- Aaron Woods
- Kayla Boyd (Darius Boyd's wife).

=== Dally M Presentation ===
==== Hosts ====
The following Fox Sports presenters were the main hosts for the event.

- Tony Squires
- Lara Pitt

==== Countdown ====
The following Fox Sports presenters were the main presenters for the countdown. They gave a brief summary round by round from round 16-26 before announcing any points given to anyone in the top 10.

- Greg Alexander
- Matthew Johns

== See also ==
- Dally M Awards
- Dally M Medal
- 2016 NRL season
