= The Night Watchmen (TV series) =

- Genre: Sport
- Starring: James Rochford; Andrew Barnett
- Country of origin: Australia
- Original language: English
- No. of seasons: 2
- No. of episodes: 17

Production
- Camera setup: Multiple-camera setup
- Running time: 45 minutes approx. (including commercials)

Original release
- Network: Fox Sports
- Release: 2018 – 2020

Related
- Narrow World of Sports

The Night Watchmen was an Australian sports television show broadcast on Fox Cricket on Friday or Saturday nights at the conclusion of the nights Big Bash League fixture. The show was co-hosted by James "The Professor" Rochford and Andrew "Barney" Barnett, who were each week joined by a cricket personality. The show took a satirical look at controversies and issues in cricket.

The show was a spin-off of the Fox League program Narrow World of Sports that aired throughout the NRL season.

In an Instagram post published on 11 December 2020, host James Rochford confirmed that the show wouldn't air as planned for the 2020-21 season, as COVID-19 restrictions prevented studio audiences attending the recordings.

== Presenters ==
- James "The Professor" Rochford (co-host, 2018–2020)
- Andrew "Barney" Barnett (co-host, 2018–2020)
- Nick Rado (Nick's News, 2019–2020)
- Sam Taunton (Innovation Station, 2018–2019)
- Kath Loughnan ('lady with the news', 2018–2019)

== History ==
The show was officially announced as part of the 2018-19 Fox Cricket line-up of programming at the launch of the channel on 9 October 2018. The show premiered on Friday 21 December 2018 at approximately 10.30pm following the Sydney Thunder vs Melbourne Stars Big Bash League fixture.

== Series overview ==
Season	Episodes	Originally aired	
Season	Episodes	First aired	Last aired
1	9	21 December 2018	15 February 2019
2	8	20 December 2019	6 February 2020

== Episodes ==
=== Season 1 (2018-19) ===
No. overall	No. in season	Title	Original release date	Australian overnight viewers
1	1	"Episode 1"	21 December 2018	136,000
Guests: Darren Lehmann, Matt Okine
2	2	"Episode 2"	28 December 2018	195,000
Guest: Shane Warne
3	3	"Episode 3"	4 January 2019	164,000
Guests: Tim Ludeman, Arj Barker
4	4	"Episode 4"	11 January 2019	150,000
Guests: Alyssa Healy, Nathan Hindmarsh
5	5	"Episode 5"	19 January 2019	154,000
Guests: Nathan Lyon, Michael Vaughan
6	6	"Episode 6"	25 January 2019	51,000
Guests: Ed Cowan, Dilruk Jayasinha
7	7	"Episode 7"	2 February 2019	155,000
Guest: Ian Botham
8	8	"Episode 8"	9 February 2019	252,000
Guests: Ian Healy, Brett Lee
9	9	"Episode 9"	15 February 2019	130,000
Guests: Jason Gillespie, Felicity Ward, Jason Krejza

=== Season 2 (2019-20) ===
No. overall	No. in season	Title	Original release date	Australian overnight viewers
10	1	"Episode 1"	20 December 2019	154,000
Guests: Brett Lee and Morné Morkel
11	2	"Episode 2"	27 December 2019	181,000
Guest: Shane Warne
12	3	"Episode 3"	3 January 2020	164,000
Guests: Ian Smith and Callum Ferguson
13	4	"Episode 4"	10 January 2020	168,000
Guest: Michael Vaughan
14	5	"Episode 5"	18 January 2020	91,000
Guest: Adam Gilchrist
15	6	"Episode 6"	25 January 2020	90,000
Guests: Isa Guha and Alyssa Healy
16	7	"Episode 7"	1 February 2020	166,000
Guest: Steve O'Keefe; Note: Barney was absent from this episode, with Nick Rado assuming co-hosting duties.
17	8	"Episode 8"	6 February 2020	141,000
Guest: David Warner

== See also ==
- List of Australian television series
