= Fox League =

Australian subscription television channel

- Country: Australia

Programming
- Language: English
- Picture format: 1080i (HDTV)

Ownership
- Owner: Fox Sports Pty Limited
- Sister channels: Fox Sports News; Fox Cricket; Fox Footy; Fox Netball; Fox Sports

History
- Launched: 27 February 2017
- Replaced: Fox Sports 502

Links
- Website: foxsports.com.au

Availability

Streaming media
- Foxtel Go: Channel 502
- Kayo Sports: Channel 502

Fox League is an Australian subscription television channel dedicated to screening rugby league (both domestic and international) matches and related programming. It is owned by Fox Sports Pty Limited and is available throughout Australia on Foxtel. The channel was launched on 27 February 2017.

== History ==
On 27 November 2015, the Australian Rugby League Commission announced that Fox Sports had secured the rights to air all National Rugby League games excluding the NRL Grand Final (which continues to be aired on Nine Network) live for the 2018–22 seasons. Additionally, it was announced that the current rights agreement had been altered to allow Fox Sports to also have the live rights for all games excluding the Grand Final for the 2016 and 2017 seasons; however, a dedicated yet-to-be-named NRL channel to showcase these rights would not launch until the 2017 season.

In February 2017 it was announced the new channel would be called Fox League and would officially launch on 27 February 2017. Ultimately, Fox League replaced Fox Sports 2 on channel 502.

In 2017, the NRL preliminary finals had 418,000 and 407,000 viewers. In 2020, Fox League began to be carried in Canada on the pay streaming service DAZN.

== Programming ==
=== Event coverage ===
Sports programming on Fox League includes the following:

==== Domestic ====
- National Rugby League (2017–present; every game live except the Grand Final)
  - NRL Pre Season Challenge (2023–present)
  - Charity Shield (2017–present)
  - All Stars match (2017–present)
- NSW Cup (2017–present; one or two games per weekend)
- Queensland Cup (2017–present; Grand Final live)
- NRL State Championship (2017–present)
- NRL Women's Premiership (2018–present; all games live)
- QRL Women's Premiership (2025–present; Grand Final live)

==== International ====
- Pacific Championships (2019–present)
- The Ashes (2025–present)

==== Foreign competitions ====
- Super League (2017–present; all games live)
- Challenge Cup (2017–present)

==== Special events ====
- Dally M Awards (2017–present)
- Australian Rugby League Hall of Fame (2018–present)

=== News and analysis programming ===
Fox League airs several studio shows, including:

- Kia Thursday Night Football (2017–present)
- VB Friday Night Footy (2017–present)
- Bundaberg Rum NRL Super Saturday (2017–present)
- Chemist Warehouse Sunday Ticket (2017–present)
- KFC Monday Football (2017–present; occasional)
- The Late Show With Matty Johns (2017–present)
- Sunday Night with Matty Johns (2017–present)
- NRL 360 (2017–present)
- NRL Tonight (2017–present)
- The Fan (2018–present)
- The Matty Johns Podcast (2019–present)
- Vossy's Awesome 80s (2020–present; during off season)
- NRLW on Fox (2026-present)

=== Former programming ===
- League 13 – to –1 (2017)
- League Legends (2017)
- On the Couch with Sterlo (2017)
- Narrow World of Sports (2017–2020)
- The Sunday Wrap (2017)
- NRL Under-20s (2017)
- Queenslanders Only (2017–2019)
- League Life (2017–2019)
- NRL Schoolboy Cup (2017–2019)
- NRL Touch Premiership (2018)
- Rugby League European Championship (2018)
- Big League Wrap (2018–2021)
- Controversy Corner (2018–2020)
- NRL Try Time (2018–2020)
- The Greatest (2018–2019)
- Rugby League World Cup 9s (2019)
- Jersey Flegg Cup (2019 NZ Warriors Home Games)
- NRL Nines (2020)
- Season's Best (2020)
- Top 5 Rivalries (2020)
- The Final 5 (2020)
- Auckland Rugby League (2020)
- Auckland Rugby League National 20's (2021–2022)
- Benji (2022)
- Koori Knockout (2022–2023)
- Rugby League World Cup (2022)
- Women's Rugby League World Cup (2022)
- Wheelchair Rugby League World Cup (2022)
- RFL Championship (2023)
- Fijian Cup Nines (2024-2025)

== Personnel ==
Network executives announced a number of key hosting personnel at the public launch of the station on 16 February 2017.

Network personalities and the media attended the launch for Fox League's 2018 programming slate on 20 February 2018. Further key hosting personnel were announced, in addition to some pre-existing roles from 2017.

=== Hosts ===
Thursday Night League

- Yvonne Sampson (2017–2021)
- Braith Anasta (2021)
- Lara Pitt (2022)
- Jess Yates (2022–present)

Friday Night Footy

- Jess Yates (2020–2021)
- Braith Anasta (2022)
- Hannah Hollis (2022)
- Yvonne Sampson (2023–present)

Super Saturday

- Yvonne Sampson (2017–present)
- Braith Anasta (2022)
- Jess Yates (2022)
- Hannah Hollis (2022)

Sunday Ticket

- Jess Yates (2017–2020)
- Lara Pitt (2018–2020, 2022)
- Hannah Hollis (2020–2021)
- Braith Anasta (2022–present)
- Yvonne Sampson (2023)
- Jake Duke (2025)

Sunday Night with Matty Johns

- Matty Johns (2017–present)
- Bryan Fletcher (2017–present)
- Nathan Hindmarsh (2020–present)
- James 'The Professor' Rochford (2017–2021)
- Emma Freedman (2018–2021)

Controversy Corner

- Graeme Hughes (2018–21)
- Phil 'Buzz' Rothfield (2018–21)
- Bill Harrigan (2018–21)
- Steve Roach (2018–21)

NRL 360

- Braith Anasta (2022–present)
- Gorden Tallis (2023, 2024–present)
- Ben Ikin (2017–2021)
- Yvonne Sampson (2021)
- Paul Kent (2017–2023, 2024)

Big League Wrap

- Yvonne Sampson (2018–2021)
- Michael Ennis (2018–2021)
- James Hooper (2018–2021)

NRL Try Time

- Lara Pitt (2018–2021)

The Fan

- Andrew Voss (2018–present)
- Lara Pitt (2020–present)

Queenslanders Only

- Hannah Hollis (2018)
- Mal Meninga (2017–2018)
- Kevin Walters (2017–2018)
- Corey Parker (2017–2018)
- Justin Hodges (2017–2018)
- Gorden Tallis (2017–2018)
- Robert 'Crash' Craddock (2017)

League Life

- Yvonne Sampson (2017–19)
- Lara Pitt (2017–19)
- Jess Yates (2017–19)
- Hannah Hollis (2017–19)

The Greatest

- Michael Ennis (2018)

The Late Show with Matty Johns

- Matty Johns (2017–present)
- Gorden Tallis (2017–present)
- Nathan Hindmarsh (2017–present)
- Bryan Fletcher (2017–present)
- Hannah Hollis (2017–19)
- Paul Kent (2017–19)

The Professor's Late Hit
(previously titled The Professor's Farewell Tour)
(also previously titled The Professor's Second Year Syndrome)

- James 'The Professor' Rochford (2017–2020)
- Brett Finch (2017–2018)
- Nathan Hindmarsh (2018–2020)
- Andrew Barnett (2018–2020)
- Chris Page (2017–2018)

Matty Johns Face to Face

- Matty Johns (2021–present)

Benji

- Benji Marshall (2022)

=== Commentators ===
==== Play-by-play ====
- Warren Smith (1995–present)
- Matt Russell (2006–present)
- Andrew Voss (2015–present)
- Dan Ginnane (2019–present)
- Jake Duke (2026–present)

==== Special comments ====
- Greg Alexander (1999–present)
- Steve Roach (2016–present)
- Braith Anasta (2015–present)
- Michael Ennis (2017–present)
- Matthew Johns (2019–present)
- Cooper Cronk (2020–present)
- Shaun Johnson (2024–present)
- Kevin Walters (2014–2020, 2025–present)
- Jared Waerea-Hargreaves (2026–present)

==== Sideline ====
- Matt Russell (2006–present)
- Lara Pitt (2007–present)
- Brent Tate (2015–present)
- Jake Duke (2023–present)
- Niko Pajarillo (2023–present)
- Eloise Sohier (2024–present)
- Taylor Curtis (2026–present) (New Zealand games)

==== Narrator ====
- Matt Nable (2018–present)

==== NSW Cup ====
- Matt Russell (play-by-play)
- Ben Homer (play-by-play)
- Owen McLeod (play-by-play) (2019–present)
- Mark Carroll (special comments)
- Niko Pajarillo (sideline)

==== NRLW ====
- Matt Russell (play-by-play)
- Ben Homer (play-by-play)
- Tony Salerno (play-by-play)
- James Preston (play-by-play)

=== Former commentators ===
- Nathan Hindmarsh (2013–2016)
- Gary Belcher (2007–2017)
- Justin Hodges (2018)
- Matt Nable (2018)
- Mark Gasnier (2012–2018)
- Luke Lewis (2019)
- Danny Buderus (2016–2019)
- Brett Kimmorley (2011–2020)
- Andy Raymond (2008–2020)
- Ben Ikin (2012–2021)
- James Graham (2020–2022)
- Brenton Speed (2017–2022)
- Benji Marshall (2022)
- Shane Flanagan (2021–2023)
- Hannah Hollis (2017–2023)
- Darcie McDonald (2023–2024)
- Corey Parker (2017–2024)
- Tiffany Salmond (2023–2024)
- James Hooper (2023–2025)
- Mal Meninga (2017–2025)
- Kieran Foran (2025-2026)

== Watch NRL ==
Outside of Australia, New Zealand and the Pacific Islands, Fox League operates Watch NRL, a global streaming network. The network streams all games live, including State of Origin and the Grand Final, unlike its domestic counterpart, who broadcasts these games on delay. This service is being retired in November 2026; eligible subscriptions are being moved to DAZN, who acquired Foxtel, owner of Fox League, in 2025.

== See also ==
- Fox Cricket
- Fox Footy
- Fox Netball
- Fox Sports
- Fox Sports 2 & Fox Soccer Plus (American simulcast partners for matches)
- List of sports television channels
