= Megan Barnard =

Australian television presenter

- Born: Kelly; 4 September 1984 (age 42); Melbourne, Victoria, Australia
- Occupation: Sports presenter
- Years active: 2005−present

Megan Barnard (born 4 September 1984) is a sports presenter for Fox Sports News Australia, Fox Cricket & MainEvent.

She was previously a sports presenter for Sky News Australia.

Barnard studied at the Queensland University of Technology in Brisbane, completing a Bachelor of Mass Communication, majoring in journalism, before joining NBN Television on the Gold Coast as a sports reporter.

She joined Australia's subscription news channel Sky News Australia in 2007.

Barnard hosts NRL Tonight on Fox Sports News on Monday, Tuesday and Wednesday nights as well as appearing on Fox League's Thursday Night Football presenting NRL news.

In 2020, Barnard was part of Seven Sport hosting the Women's Big Bash League coverage as part of the collaboration between Fox Cricket and the Seven Network due to the COVID-19 pandemic limiting the availability of presenters.

Barnard publicly came out as a lesbian in May 2022, saying “I knew I was gay since age 12.”
