= James Rochford =

Australian TV presenter and Comedian

James Rochford is an Australian TV presenter and Comedian, known as The Professor. He is best known as the host of Narrow World of Sports (previously titled The Professor's Second Year Syndrome, The Professor's Farewell Tour and The Professor's Late Hit) and The Night Watchmen. He has also made regular appearances on Sunday Night with Matty Johns.

== Personal life ==
Rochford is the brother of Australian Radio and Television personality Doctor Andrew Rochford.

== Media career ==
=== Television ===
Rochford began at Fox Sports as an associate producer in 2001. In 2007 he moved to Nine Network where he worked on The Footy Show as a producer. Rochford developed and Produced the popular Beau Knows segment with Beau Ryan In 2013 Rochford moved to Fox Sports, working on Monday Nights with Matty Johns, writing and producing the Fletch and Hindy segments, with Bryan Fletcher and Nathan Hindmarsh. He also started writing and performing the Not The NRL News segment.

In 2017, Rochford became the host of The Professor's Second Year Syndrome, a half hour Comedy Show that aired on Fox League immediately following that evenings NRL match. Rochford continued to host the show under different names including, The Professor's Farewell Tour (2018) the Professor's Late Hit (2019) and Narrow World of Sport (2020).

In 2018, Rochford was announced as the host of The Night Watchmen, a sports comedy show on Fox Cricket. He cohosted with fellow Comedian Andrew “Barney” Barnett.

=== Podcast ===
In 2023, Rochford became the host of Kick Offs and Kick Ons, an Australian rugby union podcast with Adam Ashley-Cooper, Matt Giteau and Drew Mitchell.
