= Sunday Night with Matty Johns =

- Genre: sports
- Presented by: Matthew Johns
- Starring: Nathan Hindmarsh; Gorden Tallis; Bryan Fletcher 'Professor' James Rochford; Lara Pitt
- Country of origin: Australia
- Original language: English
- No. of seasons: 4

Production
- Production locations: Fox Sports Studio, Sydney, New South Wales, Australia
- Running time: 60 minutes

Original release
- Network: Fox Sports; Fox League (2017-)
- Release: 4 March 2013 – present

Related
- The Matty Johns Show; (25 March - 23 September 2010)

Sunday Night with Matty Johns is an Australian sports television series which began airing on Fox Sports on 4 March 2013. The show, previously on Monday nights, changed to Sunday night in 2018.

The show expanded to two nights a week (Mondays and Thursdays) on Thursday, 5 March 2015. In 2016, the show reverted to a single night (Mondays) due to Fox Sports televising Thursday Night Football.

Now, in 2023 Matty Johns hosts The Late Show with Matty Johns on Thursdays, where he is joined on the couch by Fletch, Hindy & Gordie. Following the conclusion of the NRL Round, Matty Johns is joined by Fletch & Hindy once again with a special guest to wrap up the round of footy. Laurie Daley joins the panel as the TAB representative on both Thursday and Sunday nights.

== Hosts ==
Current

- Matthew Johns (Host)
- Nathan Hindmarsh
- Bryan Fletcher
- Gorden Tallis

Past

- Brett Finch
- Lara Pitt
- Jamiee Rogers
- James 'The Professor' Rochford
- Chris Page
- Emma Freedman

== Episodes ==
Season 2022

Episode No.	Guest	Description	Air Date
1	Nicho Hynes	Matty is joined by Fletch, Hindy and Nicho Hynes as they discuss Round 1 results and Josh Addo-Carr gives a famous interview after a gutsy Bulldogs win.	March 13, 2022
2	Jarome Luai & Sean O'Sullivan	Matty, Fletch and Hindy are joined on the couch by Penrith duo Jarome Luai and Sean O'Sullivan for a fun look at round two of the NRL.	March 20, 2022
3	Latrell Mitchell	Matty is joined on the couch by Fletch and Hindy, and Rabbitohs star Latrell Mitchell following Souths' big win over the Roosters.	March 27, 2022
4	Jackson Hastings & Oliver Gildart	Matty is joined by Fletch, Hindy and Wests Tigers stars Jackson Hastings and Oliver Gildart to wrap up Round 4 of the NRL.	April 3, 2022
5	Millie Boyle	Matty Johns will be joined by Bryan Fletcher, Nathan Hindmarsh and new NRLW Dally M Medalist Millie Boyle to wrap up round five of the NRL season.	April 10, 2022
6	Toby Rudolf	Sharks star Toby Rudolf joins Matty, Fletch and Hindy on the couch to wrap up a huge round six of NRL.	April 17, 2022
7	Cody Walker	Cody Walker joins Matty, Fletch & Hindy to look at the round 7 action - including the Rabbitohs/Tigers thriller - and look ahead to Monday's match-ups.	April 24, 2022
8	Victor Radley	Matty Johns is joined by Bryan Fletcher, Nathan Hindmarsh and Roosters lock Victor Radley to wrap up the round's action, along with plenty of laughs.	May 1, 2022
9	Josh Addo-Carr	Stick around after the Sharks v Warriors clash for Sunday Night with Matty, as the guys run their eye over R9 & are joined by special guest Josh Addo-Carr	May 8, 2022
10	Adam Reynolds & Tino Fa'asuamaleaui	Matty is joined at Suncorp Stadium by Fletch, Hindy, Gordie, Adam Reynolds and Tino Fa'asuamaleaui for an entertaining review of Magic Round.	May 15, 2022
11	Junior Paulo	Matty, Fletch and Hindy are joined by Parramatta enforcer Junior Paulo to review the Round 11 matches in the NRL with plenty of laughs along the way.	May 22, 2022
12	Steve Renouf & Laurie Daley	As they wrap up round 12, Matty, Gordy, Fletch and Hindy are joined by Steve Renouf and Laurie Daley as well as crossing to George Kambosos.	May 29, 2022
13	Andrew Ettingshausen & Matt Moylan	Matty Johns and the boys are joined by Andrew Ettingshausen & Matt Moylan discussing the round's action and look ahead to Game 1 of State of Origin.	June 5, 2022
14	Andrew McCullough & Blake Lawrie	Matty Johns is joined by Fletch and Hindy with Andrew McCullough and Blake Lawrie to review Round 14 so far, with plenty of laughs along the way.	June 13, 2022
15	Jason Saab & Morgan Harper	Matty Johns is joined by Fletch and Hindy along with special guests Jason Saab and Morgan Harper to dissect Round 15's action with plenty of laughs.	June 19, 2022
16	Brandon Smith	Matty Johns will be joined by Fletch and Hindy and special guest Brandon Smith to dissect Round 16's action, with plenty of laughs along the way.	July 3, 2022
17	Dylan Brown	Matty, Fletch and Hindy are joined by Eels star Dylan Brown to review the last split round of the season.	July 10, 2022
18	Scott Drinkwater	Matty, Fletch & Hindy are joined by Cowboys fullback Scott Drinkwater to break down Origin and round 18 as we edge towards finalising the top 8.	July 17, 2022
19	Kalyn Ponga	Matty Johns and the boys are joined by a winner of the Cowboys-Tigers match, Kalyn Ponga is on the couch and Fletch's 'Say Hello To My Little Friend.'	July 24, 2022
20	Adam Elliot & Millie Boyle	Matty Johns will be joined by Bryan Fletcher, Nathan Hindmarsh with special guests Adam Elliot and Millie Boyle to wrap up the round's action.	July 31, 2022
21	Cameron Munster & Brett Kenny	Following a stacked Sunday of footy, including a thriller in Campbelltown, Matty and the boys are joined by Cam Munster and Brett Kenny.	August 7, 2022
22	Dylan Edwards	Matty Johns and the crew react to the Bulldogs' new coach signing and shock results from round 22. Plus, Panthers superstar Dylan Edwards joins the couch.	August 14, 2022
23	Corey Oates	Broncos winger Corey Oates joins a special edition of Sunday Night with Matty, as they wrap up a big round of footy.	August 21, 2022
24	Dale Finucane & Robbie Kearns	Matty is joined by Fletch and Hindy, as well as Dale Finucane and Robbie Kearns, as they review a massive round of NRL action.	August 28, 2022
25	Michael Maguire	Matty Johns will be joined by Bryan Fletcher, Nathan Hindmarsh and special guest Michael Maguire to wrap Round 25 and preview the upcoming finals.	September 4, 2022
26	Finals Footy: Gordon Tallis & Api Koroisau	Straight from Roosters-Rabbitohs, Matty, Fletch, Hindy, Tallis & Koroisau review a wild game at Allianz and the rest of Week 1 of Finals.	September 11, 2022
27	Finals Footy: Matt Burton	Matt Burton joins Matty, Fletch and Hindy to wrap up the semi finals footy action with plenty of laughs along the way.	September 17, 2022
28	Finals Footy: Hudson Young	The guys are joined by Raiders back-rower Hudson Young as they breakdown the Cowboys-Eels and preview the GF rematch between the Panthers and Rabbitohs.	September 24, 2022
29	Grand Final Preview	Matty, Fletch & Hindy preview the biggest game of the year as the Panthers and Eels prepare to clash in the NRL Grand Final this Sunday.	September 29, 2022

Season 2023

Episode No.	Guest	Description	Air Date
1	Campbell Graham	A wild weekend of football comes to a close, as the guys react to West Tigers v Titans & the Dolphins first grade debut, with special guest Campbell Graham.	March 5, 2023
2	Isaah Yeo	Matty, Fletch & Hindy are joined by two time premiership winner Isaah Yeo to wrap up the round's action, with plenty of laughs along the way.	March 12, 2023
3	Sam Walker & The DMA's	Matty's joined by Fletch & Hindy and Roosters star Sam Walker to review round three of the NRL season. Plus a live performance from DMAs.	March 19, 2023
4	Sam Verrills & Mat Rogers	The guys react to Dragons and Sharks and recap a wild RD4 of NRL action. Plus, Titans hooker Sam Verrills and duel-code Australian rep Mat Rogers join.	March 26, 2023
5	Lachlan Miller	Matty is joined by Lachie Miller, Fletch and Hindy to review Round 5. Plus segments including 'Call Me', 'Retro Rewind' and 'Hit Me with Your Best Shot'.	April 2, 2023
6	Toby Rudolf & Sean O'Sullivan	Matty is joined by Toby Rudolf, Sean O'Sullivan, Fletch & Hindy to review the first seven games of Round 6.	April 9, 2023
7	Jai Arrow	Matty Johns will be joined by Fletch & Hindy as well as special guest Rabbitohs and Maroons forward Jai Arrow to wrap up the round's action.	April 16, 2023
8	Brett & Josh Morris	Matty Johns is joined by Bryan Fletch, Nathan Hindmarsh and special guests Brett & Josh Morris to review the round of NRL so far.	April 23, 2023
9	Ryan Papenhuyzen	The guys react to Dragons-Bulldogs and Ryan Papenhuyzen joins the show to discuss his recover and take on Round 9.	April 30, 2023
10	Patrick Carrigan	Matty is joined by Pat Carrigan, Gordie, Fletch & Hindy for the ideal way to wind down after Magic Round in Brisbane.	May 7, 2023
11	Reed Mahoney	Matty Johns is joined by Bryan Fletcher, Laurie Daley and special guests to wrap up the round's action, with plenty of laughs along the way.	May 14, 2023
12	Reuben Cotter	Reuben Cotter joins the show as Matty, Fletch & Hindy discuss Round 12 in the NRL.	May 21, 2023
13	Corey Horsburgh	Matty Johns is joined by Bryan Fletcher, Nathan Hindmarsh and special guest Corey Horsburgh from the Raiders to review Round 13 and preview Origin.	May 28, 2023
14	Alex Twal & John Bateman	Matty Johns is joined by Bryan Fletcher, Nathan Hindmarsh and special guests Alex Twal & John Bateman from the Wests Tigers. Plus, the latest on Nathan Cleary.	June 4, 2023
15	Herbie Farnworth	Matty Johns is joined by Fletch and Hindy as they wrap the weekend of footy. Plus, England International Herbie Farnworth joins the show.	June 11, 2023
16	Zac Lomax & Blake Lawrie	Matty Johns is joined by Bryan Fletcher, Nathan Hindmarsh and Dragons duo Zac Loman & Blake Lawrie who answer some tough questions about teammate Ben Hunt.	June 18, 2023
17	Kalyn Ponga	Matty Johns is joined by Bryan Fletcher, Nathan Hindmarsh and Kalyn Ponga to wrap up the round's action, and State of Origin II.	June 25, 2023
18	Harry Grant	Matty and the guys review the Sea Eagles-Roosters clash and discuss the rest of Round 18. Plus, they're joined by QLD Maroon and Storm hooker Harry Grant.	July 2, 2023
19	Glenn Lazarus	Matty Johns is joined by Bryan Fletcher, Nathan Hindmarsh and special guest Glenn Lazarus to wrap up the round's action, with plenty of laughs along the way.	July 9, 2023
20	Jamie Goddard	Matty Johns is joined by Bryan Fletcher, Nathan Hindmarsh and special guest Jamie Goddard to wrap up the round's action, with plenty of laughs along the way.	July 16, 2023
21	Phil Blake	Matty Johns is joined by Bryan Fletcher, Nathan Hindmarsh and Phil Blake as they review a massive round 21 of NRL action.	July 23, 2023
22	Nathan Lyon	Injured Australian legend Nathan Lyon joins Matty, Fletch and Hindy to review round 22 of the NRL season and discuss the ongoing Ashes series.	July 30, 2023
23	Nate Myles	Matty Johns is joined by Bryan Fletcher, Nathan Hindmarsh and Nate Myles as they review the Raiders v Tigers clash.	August 6, 2023
24	H.G. Nelson	Matty Johns is joined by Bryan Fletcher, Nathan Hindmarsh and H.G. Nelson to wrap up the round's action, with plenty of laughs along the way.	August 13, 2023
25	Tino Fa'asuamaleaui	Matty Johns is joined by Bryan Fletcher, Nathan Hindmarsh and Tino Fa'asuamaleaui to wrap up the round's action, with plenty of laughs along the way.	August 20, 2023
26	Scott Sorensen & Mitch Kenny	Matty Johns is joined by Bryan Fletcher, Nathan Hindmarsh and special guests Scott Sorensen & Mitch Kenny to wrap up the round's action.	August 27, 2023
27	Dom Young & Adam Elliott	Matty Johns is joined by Bryan Fletcher, Nathan Hindmarsh along with Dom Young and Adam Elliott to wrap up the round's action, with plenty of laughs along the way.	September 3, 2023
28	Finals Footy: Sam Burgess	Matty Johns is joined by Bryan Fletcher, Nathan Hindmarsh and Sam Burgess who reflects on his exit from Souths as the crew review Week 1 of finals.	September 10, 2023
29	Finals Footy: Sam Burgess & Michael Maguire	Matty is joined by Sam Burgess, Michael Maguire, Fletch & Hindy as they recap the semi-finals. Plus, Hindy's Finals Footy Flavours with Steve Menzies.	September 16, 2023
30	Finals Footy: Denan Kemp & Sam Burgess	Matty and the Crew preview tonight's blockbuster match between the Broncos and Warriors and analyse last night's Panthers-Storm matchup.	September 23, 2023
31	Finals Footy: Harry Grant & Sam Burgess	Matty and the crew preview this weekend's blockbuster Grand final matches with the Broncos-Panther in the NRL and the Knights-Titans in the NRLW.	September 28, 2023

Season 2024

Episode No.	Guest	Description	Air Date
1	Victor Radley	Join Matty and the gang directly after Cowboys-Dolphins as they react to the opening round of the season.	March 10, 2024
2	Nicho Hynes	Matty is joined by Fletch, Hindy & Nicho Hynes to unwind after Round 2. Featuring Maccas I'm Lovin' It, Fletch at the VB Bar & A to Z of rugby league.	March 17, 2024
3	Jai Arrow & Campbell Graham	Matty is joined by Fletch, Hindy, Jai Arrow & Campbell Graham to unwind after RD3. Plus Maccas I'm Lovin' It, Fletch & VB Bar & A-Z of rugby league.	March 24, 2024
4	Reed Mahoney	Matty is joined by Fletch, Hindy & Reed Mahoney to recap the round so far & preview Eels-Tigers clash. Featuring Maccas I'm Lovin' It & Fletch at VB Bar.	March 31, 2024
5	Jayden Brailey & Blayke Brailey	Matty is joined by Fletch, Hindy and brothers Blayke & Jayden Brailey to unwind after Round 5.	April 7, 2024
6	Tom Dearden & Scott Drinkwater	Matty is joined by Fletch, Hindy, Tom Dearden & Scott Drinkwater to look back on round 6.	April 14, 2024
7	David Klemmer & Alex Twal	Matty is joined by Hindy, David Klemmer & Alex Twal for a fun way to unwind after Round 7. Plus Maccas I'm Lovin' It, VB Bar & A to Z od Rugby League	April 21, 2024
8	Stephen Crichton & Jacob Kiraz	Matty is joined by Fletch, Hindy, Stephen Crichton & Jacob Kiraz for a fun way to unwind after Round 8. Plus Maccas I'm Lovin' It, Fletch at VB Bar & more.	April 28, 2024
9	Jamal Fogarty & Hudson Young	Matty is joined by Fletch, Hindy, Jamal Fogarty & Hudson Young for a fun way to unwind after Round 9. Plus Macca's I'm Lovin' It, Fletch at VB Bar & more.	May 5, 2024
10	Ben Hunt & Kyle Flanagan	Matty is joined by Fletch, Hindy, Ben Hunt & Kyle Flanagan to unwind after Round 10, including Maccas I'm Lovin' It, VB Bar & A to Z of Rugby League.	May 12, 2024
11	Magic Round: Harry Grant & Tino Fa'asuamaleaui	Matty is joined by Gordie, Fletch, Himmdy, Harry Grant & Tino Fa'asuamaleaui	May 19, 2024
12	Adam Elliott & Timana Tahu	Matty is joined by Fletch, Hindy, Adam Elliott & Timana Tahu for the ideal way to unwind after Indigenous Round. Featuring Macca's I'm Lovin' It & VB Bar.	May 26, 2024
13	Junior Paulo	Matty Johns is joined by Bryan Fletcher, Nathan Hindmarsh and special guest Junior Paulo joins to chat about the Eels.	June 2, 2024
14	Mark Hughes & Kurt Gidley	Matty is joined by Fletch, Hindy, Mark Hughes & Kurt Gidley to recap the round so far & preview Bulldogs-Eels.	June 9, 2024
15	Joseph Sua'ali'i & Connor Watson	Matty is joined by Joseph Sua'ali'i, Connor Watson, Fletch & Hindy for the best way to unwind after RD15. Plus Macca's I'm Lovin' It, VB Bar & Origin Chat.	June 16, 2024
16	Greg Inglis	Matty is joined by Greg Inglis, Fletch & Hindy for latest SOO news & Round 16 recap. Plus McSmart Moments, VB Bar & they'll look at Greg's amazing career.	June 23, 2024
17	Herbie Farnworth & Isaiya Katoa	Matty is joined by Herbie Farnworth, Isaiya Katoa, Fletch & Hindy for a fun recap of Round 17. Plus McSmart Moments, Fletch at the VB Bar & More.	June 30, 2024
18	AJ Brimson	Matty is joined by AJ Brimson, Fletch & Hindy for the best way to unwind after Round 18. Plus Nedd Brockmann, Macca's I'm Lovin' It & Fletch at the VB Bar.	July 7, 2024
19	Tom Hazelton & Dale Finucane	Matty is joined by Tom Hazelton, Dale Finucane, Fletch & Hindy for the best way to review Round 19. Plus Macca's I'm Lovin' It & Fletch at VB Bar.	July 14, 2024
20	Api Koroisau & Lachlan Galvin	Matty is joined by Api Koroisau, Lachlan Galvin, Fletch & Hindy for the best way to unwind after Round 20. Plus Macca's I'm Lovin It & Fletch at VB Bar.	July 21, 2024
21	Angus Crichton & Luke Ricketson	Fletch is joined by Angus Crichton, Luke Ricketson, Hindy & Gordie for the best way to unwind after Rnd 21. Plus Hindy at VB Bar & Macca's I'm Lovin' It.	July 28, 2024
22	Paul Sironen	Fletch is joined by Paul Sironen, Hindy & Gordie for a fun recap of Round 22. Plus Macca's I'm Lovin' It, Hindy at VB Bar & more.	August 4, 2024

== See also ==
- List of Australian television series
- List of longest-running Australian television series
