= Warren Smith (broadcaster) =

Australian rugby league commentator

- Born: Warren Smith
- Citizenship: Australian
- Occupation: Sports commentator
- Employer: Fox League

Warren Smith is an Australian rugby league commentator for Fox Sports Australia.

Smith has been with the pay TV network since 1995 and has gained a reputation for his distinctive style and versatility. Smith has made the term "They're gonna say…” his own. (For example, “They're gonna say it's a knock on.” “They're gonna say the pass was forward.”) He's also known for being inexplicably incredulous. (For example, saying "And wow! They're gonna say it was forward!" in a stunned voice, despite the pass clearly being forward.)

Smith is essentially the face of Fox Sports coverage of the National Rugby League competition and typically calls two or three matches per round. He has also called the 2010/11 KFC Twenty20 Big Bash League cricket tournament.

Smith made an appearance for ESPN as an on-site analyst for the 2016 College Football Sydney Cup for a crew back in Bristol.

In 2016, Smith shared how he prepares to commentate on rugby league games. Speaking to The Daily Telegraph, Smith said, "You don't rest your voice as such. There are situations I will avoid, though, like the times I find myself in a pub during the footy season. It is loud and you have to raise your voice to be heard. It is a strain on your voice you don't need. I put a steamer on my face most days at this time of year to suck in steam. I live on lozenges and mints. I drink ridiculous amounts of water. I try to keep hydrated."

As of the start of the 2018 NRL season, Smith began co-hosting Fox League's weekly rugby league podcast, “Take Me Now, I Have Seen It All” (named after Smith's famous call of a last-second comeback victory by the South Sydney Rabbitohs over the Sydney Roosters in 2012) along with fellow Fox League caller Matt Russell. The podcast reviewed the previous week’s matches, discussed big talking points in the game, and previewed upcoming matches. From the end of the season and from 2019, Lara Pitt was also a weekly fixture of the podcast.

For the first time since he began with Fox Sports, Smith was missing from the Fox League coverage at the commencement of the 2026 NRL season, with the broadcaster revealed to have been "diagnosed with precancerous lesions in his voice box." Smith had commentated the 2025 NRL Grand Final and noticed that his voice was not at its best, leading to the diagnosis.
