= Anti-siphoning laws in Australia =

Laws to prevent pay-TV monopoly over broadcasting significant sporting events

Anti-siphoning laws in Australia regulate the media companies' access to significant sporting events. In 1992, when the country experienced growth in paid-subscription media, the Parliament of Australia enacted the Broadcasting Services Act 1992 that gave free-to-air broadcasters essentially first refusal to certain sporting event broadcasting rights. The anti-siphoning list is a list of events, the televising of which should, in the opinion of the relevant Minister, be available free to the general public. The Broadcasting Services Act 1992 includes a licence condition on pay TV providers that prohibits them from acquiring anti-siphoning events unless a national broadcaster or a network of commercial television broadcasters have the right to televise the events. This prohibition drops away a certain period before the event starts. The current anti-siphoning rules also prohibit national television broadcasters and commercial television broadcasters from premiering listed events on digital multi-channels. Listed events may be shown on digital multi-channels if they have already been broadcast, or are simultaneously broadcast on the broadcaster's main channel.

The anti-siphoning list came into effect in 2006. The relevant Minister has the power to add, amend or remove events from the list. Currently, only sporting events are listed, even though the Broadcasting Services Act 1992 does not limit the types of events that can be listed. There are currently ten sport types (e.g. tennis, soccer, rugby league) on the anti-siphoning list plus the Olympic and Commonwealth Games. Events on the anti-siphoning list are delisted 12 weeks before they start to ensure pay TV broadcasters have reasonable access to listed events, if free-to-air broadcasters decide not to purchase the broadcast rights for a particular event. Any rights to listed sporting events that are not acquired by free-to-air broadcasters are available to pay TV. Before the end of 2009, the Federal Government conducted a review of the anti-siphoning scheme, with the Minister proposing changes to the scheme. These changes can not come into effect until amending legislation is passed through the Australian Parliament.

In 2018, after cricket broadcasting deals were announced with Cricket Australia, Seven Network and Fox Cricket, Men’s ODIs and T20s will be live and exclusively broadcast on Foxtel.

== Listed events ==
The most accurate and up to date anti-siphoning list is available on the comlaw website. Generally, the following events are anti-siphoning events:

- Olympic Games
  - Each event held as part of the Summer and Winter Olympic Games.
- Commonwealth Games
  - Each event held as part of the Commonwealth Games.
- Horse racing
  - The Melbourne Cup.
- Australian rules football
  - Each match in the AFL Premiership competition, including the Finals Series.
- Rugby league
  - Each match in the NRL Premiership competition, including the Finals Series.
  - The State of Origin Series.
  - Each international test match played in Australia or New Zealand that involves the senior Australian representative team.
  - Each Rugby League World Cup match played in Australia, New Zealand, or Papua New Guinea that involves the senior Australian representative team.
- Rugby union
  - Each international Test match played in Australia or New Zealand involving the senior Australian representative team.
  - Each match in the Rugby World Cup involving the senior Australian representative team, as well as the final.
- Cricket
  - Each test match (cricket) involving the senior Australian representative team played in Australia.
  - Each test match between the senior Australian representative team and the senior English representative team, played in Australia or the United Kingdom.
  - Each one day cricket match involving the senior Australian representative team played in Australia.
  - Each Twenty20 cricket match involving the senior Australian representative team played in Australia.
  - Each match of the ICC Cricket World Cup involving the senior Australian representative team played in Australia or New Zealand.
  - The final of the ICC Cricket World Cup if it is played in Australia or New Zealand.
  - Each match of the ICC World Twenty20 involving the senior Australian representative team played in Australia or New Zealand.
  - The final of the ICC World Twenty20 if it is played in Australia or New Zealand.
- Soccer
  - Each match of the FIFA World Cup tournament involving the senior Australian representative team. This includes FIFA Women's World Cup matches involving the senior Australian women's representative team.
  - The FIFA World Cup final.
  - Each match in the FIFA World Cup Qualification tournament involving the senior Australian representative team played in Australia.
- Tennis
  - The Australian Open.
  - Each rubber in each tie in the Davis Cup involving the Australian team played in Australia.
  - The Davis Cup final if it involves the Australian team.
- Netball
  - The semi-final of the Netball World Cup if it involves the senior Australian representative team.
  - The final of the Netball World Cup if it involves the senior Australian representative team.
- Motor sports
  - The Australian Grand Prix.
  - The Australian MotoGP.
  - Each Bathurst 1000 race in the Supercars Series.

== Changes ==
Sporting events are added and removed from the list from time to time. For example, in 2017, the English FA Cup final, finals of the Wimbledon Championships and the US Open, international netball matches, and a number of golf events were removed from the list.
