= What's Good For You =

- 2006-2008 logo
- Presented by: Sigrid Thornton (2006–2007); Lisa Wilkinson (2008); Dr. Andrew Rochford (2009)
- Country of origin: Australia
- Original language: English
- No. of seasons: 4

Production
- Running time: 30 minutes (including commercials)
- Production company: Beyond Productions

Original release
- Network: Nine Network
- Release: 2006 – 2009

What's Good For You is a Logie Award-winning Australian health and lifestyle television program that airs on the Nine Network. It investigates myths and fables concerning health and well-being. Examples of myths investigated include "Does chocolate really cause pimples?", "Is there a cure for hiccups?" and "What foods produce the most flatulence?".

The show was initially broadcast as an ongoing series of 60-minute episodes in 2006 and 2007. In 2008, Nine announced plans to revise the format of the program in the form of stand alone specials, with the first broadcast in this format later that year. The series returned as an ongoing series, albeit in a 30-minute format, from 8 April 2009.

== Presenters ==
The original incarnation of What's Good For You in 2006 was hosted by Sigrid Thornton, with segments presented by Brooke Hanson, Leila McKinnon, Dr. Andrew Rochford and Michael Slater. The presenters remained the same in 2007, but with the addition of Giaan Rooney to the line up. Jessica Rowe also featured in a guest presenter spot in 2007. For the series' spring special in 2008, Thornton was replaced as host by Lisa Wilkinson, and Rochford was joined by new presenters Shelley Craft, landscaper Melissa King and the "Barefoot Investor" Scott Pape.

In the series' 2009 relaunch, Rochford was promoted to series host, whilst Craft, King and Pape have been replaced by new presenters Grant Hackett, Janella Purcell and Lyndsey Rodrigues.

- Grant Hackett (2009)
- Janella Purcell (2009)
- Dr. Andrew Rochford (2006 – 2009, host 2009)
- Lyndsey Rodrigues (2009)
- Scott Pape (2008)
- Shelley Craft (2007)
- Brooke Hanson (2006–2007)
- Melissa King (2008)
- Leila McKinnon (2006–2007)
- Giaan Rooney (2007)
- Jessica Rowe (guest presenter 2007)
- Michael Slater (2006–2007)
- Sigrid Thornton (host 2006 – 2007)
- Lisa Wilkinson (host 2008)

== DVD release ==
The first season of What's Good For You was released on DVD in January 2009 as a four-disc set.

== Cancellation ==
In late 2009, Nine announced in their Nine In 2010 brief on their corporate site that they were developing new episodes of What's Good For You to broadcast sometime in 2010. However, no new series of the show materialised during the year. When Nine released their Nine in 2011 brief in late 2010, What's Good For You was not mentioned at all.
