= Fox Sports News (Australia) =

Australian cable and satellite sports news channel

- Type: Sports News
- Country: Australia
- Headquarters: Gore Hill, New South Wales

Programming
- Language: English
- Picture format: 1080i (HDTV)

Ownership
- Owner: Fox Sports Australia
- Sister channels: Fox Cricket; Fox League; Fox Footy; Fox Netball; Fox Sports

History
- Launched: 1 October 2006; 20 years ago

Links
- Website: foxsports.com.au

Availability

Streaming media
- Foxtel Go: Channel 500
- Kayo Sports: Channel 500

Fox Sports News is an Australian cable and satellite sports news channel, owned by Fox Sports.

== History ==
Fox Sports News launched on 1 October 2006. Initially, for 6 hours a day (midnight – 6 am AEST) the channel would simulcast Sky Sports News, similar to the set-up of Australian News channel Sky News Australia. It was later replaced by a continuous loop of different newscasts broadcast that day.

On 5 March 2013 at Fox Sports new headquarters launch in Gore Hill, New South Wales, among the announcements relating to Fox Sports was the new logo of Fox Sports and Fox Sports News which is in line with its global affiliate broadcasters.

On 3 November 2014, Fox Sports News launched a HD simulcast. In addition, it moved from channel 513 to channel 500.

Fox Sports News is available at the Fox Sports website free of charge. However, its live stream is only accessible in Australia.

The live programming has always been varied since the channel's launch. It was originally live from 6 am to midnight, then 6 am to 1 am, and 5 am to 1 am. It currently runs live programming from 5:30 am to 12:30 am.

== Presenters ==
- Megan Barnard
- Jim Callinan
- Sophie Clapin
- Catherine Durkin
- Joanna Healy
- Scott Jackson
- Isabella Leembruggen
- Kath Loughnan
- Lara Pitt
- Yvonne Sampson
- Warren Smith
- Julie Snook
- Eloise Sohier
- Sam Squires
- Matt Suleau
- James Preston
- Sara Karaoglu
- Charmaine Mifsud

== Former presenters ==
- Luke Doherty (now News Editor, Fox Sports News Australia)
- Lee Furlong
- Daniel Garb (now ABC and Paramont+/Network 10)
- Steve Hart (now 7News QLD)
- Adam Hawse (now 2GB Sydney)
- Christian Jantzen (now WIN News QLD)
- Glen Lauder (now Network 10)
- Mel McLaughlin (now 7News Sydney)
- Gerard Middleton
- Heather Miller
- Josh Money (now 9News Adelaide)
- Leith Mulligan
- David Murdoch
- Adam Peacock (now Stan Sport)
- Ryan Phelan
- Dean Potter
- Louise Ransome
- Amanda Shalala (now ABC News)
- Matt Shirvington (now Sunrise Channel 7)
- Alana Smith
- Alissa Smith (now 7News QLD)
- Chris Stubbs (now Tennis Australia, Stan Sport and Seven Network)
- Chris Warren
- Tom Wilson (now 7News Adelaide)
- Natalie Yoannidis (now 9News Melbourne)

== Reporters ==
- Catherine Durkin (NSW)
- Drew Jones (VIC)
- Cody Kaye (NSW)
- Dane Lillingstone (NSW)
- Charmaine Mifsud
- Sarah Olle (Fox Footy)
- Geoff Smith (NSW)
- Josh Bristow (QLD)

== Programs ==
=== Rolling news coverage ===
- Sports First (daily 5:30 am – 9:00 am)
- Sports Nation (weekdays 9:00 am & 6:00 pm)
- Sportsday (weekdays 10:00 am – 6:00 pm)
- Sportsnight (weekdays 7:00 pm – 10:00 pm)
- Gameday Live (weekends 9:00 – 10:30 am)
- Sports Saturday (Saturday 10:30 am – 10:00 pm)
- Sports Sunday (Sunday 10:30 am – 6:00 pm)
- Fulltime Live (Thursday to Saturday 10:00 pm – 12:00 am, Sunday 6:00 pm – 9:00 pm)
- Extra Time (Sunday to Wednesday 10:00 pm – 12:30 am, Friday to Sunday 12:00 am – 12:30 am)

=== Specialty ===
- The Serve – Monday to Thursday, 6:00 pm – 6:30 pm
- Fox Sports Tonight – Monday to Thursday, 7:00 pm – 8:00 pm.
- The Early Lead – Weeknights, 11:00 pm – 11:30 pm with Dan Ginnane.

Seasonal:

- Cricket AM – 9:30 am – 10:00 am hosted by Jim Callinan.
- AFL tonight – Weeknights, 5:00 pm – 5:30 pm
- NRL tonight – Weeknights, 5:30 pm – 6:00 pm

=== Former programs ===
- The Back Page
- FOX Sports News
- FOX Sports News & Views
- FOX Sports News Bet
- FOX Sports News Express
- FOX Sports News HQ
- FOX Sports News Overnight
- Full Time
- Long Lunch
- Morning News
- Morning Rush
- Peak Hour
- Sports Bite

== See also ==
- Fox Sports Australia
- News24
