= Christian Jantzen =

Australian television presenter

- Born: Christian Harley Jantzen
- Education: Newington College
- Occupations: Sports, journalist, reporter and radio host
- Spouse: Leanne Nebe

Christian Harley Jantzen is an Australian sports journalist, reporter, and radio host.

== Early life and education ==
Christian Harley Jantzen attended Newington College in Sydney (1986–1995).

He is a graduate of Macleay College, and also attended the Max Rowley Media School. In conjunction with his studies, he spent two years learning how to be a reporter in the Sydney newsroom at Channel 9.

== Career ==
Jantzen produced and hosted programs on Sydney radio station 2UE. In Sydney, he worked as a presenter and reporter at Channels 7, 9, and the ABC. His career highlight was reporting and producing for Channel 7 during the 2000 Sydney Olympics.

In 2000, Jantzen moved to Melbourne and started freelancing at SBS Sport, before joining the team full-time in November 2004.

He joined Fox Sports News in 2007.

== Recognition and awards ==
Jantzen won the "Best Sports Story (Television)" at the 2004 Queensland Regional Media Awards.
