= Andrew Rochford =

Australian TV and radio presenter

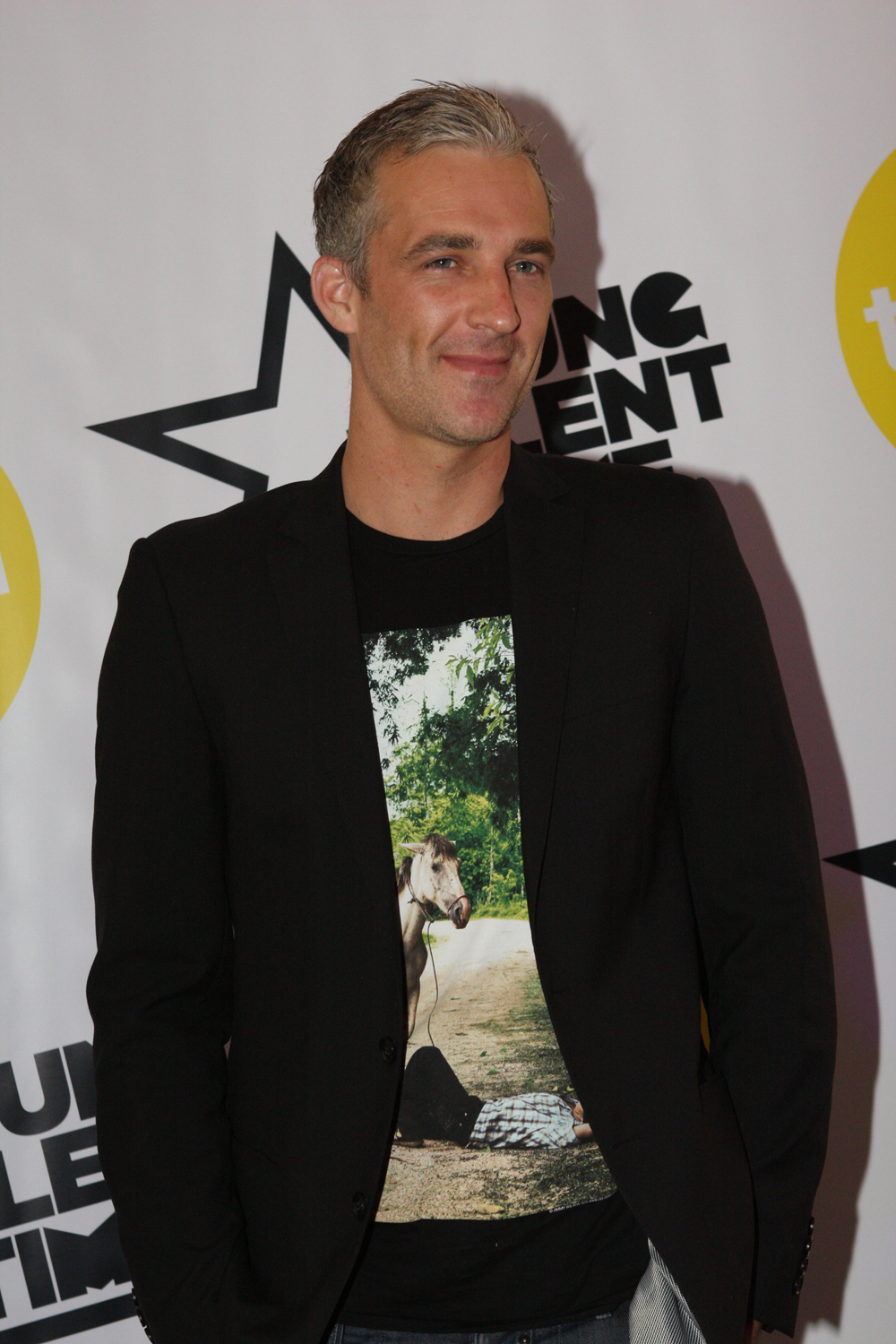
- Born: Andrew Michael Rochford; Sydney, Australia
- Other names: Doc, Rochie
- Education: Bachelor of Medicine/Bachelor of Surgery (2004/2005)
- Alma mater: University of Sydney
- Occupations: Television and radio presenter
- Employer: Healthscope
- Spouse: Jamie Nicholson (m. 2005)
- Children: 3

Andrew Michael Rochford is an Australian television and radio presenter.

Rochford was formerly a co-host of Network Ten's Breakfast program alongside Paul Henry and Kathryn Robinson and National Medical Editor on the Seven Network.

== Personal life ==
Rochford was born in Sydney, and grew up on the Northern Beaches. He attended secondary school at St Augustine's College before going to university and completing an undergraduate degree in medical science at the University of Sydney followed by a graduate degree in medicine, which he finalised in 2004, passing with honours.

Rochford lives an active lifestyle and enjoys playing many different sports such as swimming, skiing, basketball and golf in his spare time.

Rochford is the brother of Australian Radio and Television personality James Rochford.

== Media career ==
=== Television ===
In 2004, Rochford and Jamie Nicholson, his girlfriend at that time, entered a competition to be a part of the Australian television show The Block. They were accepted as a reserve in the event of a departure by any other couple. Two other contestants were forced to depart after one of the couple was found to have spent six months in jail during 2002 after conviction for a drug-related offence. Rochford and his partner then went on to win the show, which included a prize money of $100,000 plus any extra money that could be won after the auction of the property they had renovated. Following that auction, the apartment they renovated sold for $868,000 which meant that the couple pocketed the extra $78,000 above the reserve price.

Rochford's profile was so increased by his time on The Block that shortly after his win, he was offered a position with the What's Good For You team and joined the television program in 2006. The program was hosted by Sigrid Thornton. Specifically, Rochford's task was in part to report on certain medical myths and to be a medical "guinea-pig", testing out the fact or fallacy of the underpinning suggestion of the myth. For example, he was stung by a jellyfish to see what method best relieved the pain; ate 15 kilograms (33 lb) of carrots to see if that consumption would improve his eyesight. In addition to his role as a "guinea pig", he also has undertaken more serious roles. For example, he reported on the concentration of pathogens in various meats and related those facts to a better understanding of how to cook those meats.

Rochford has also been on game shows such as Who Wants to Be a Millionaire?, Temptation as a guest playing for charity.

In 2010, Rochford joined Network Ten's The Project as a regular guest panelist. He was a regular guest panelist on The Circle and had a cameo appearance in an episode of Offspring.

On 18 August 2011, it was announced that Rochford would be a co-host of Network Ten's new breakfast show Breakfast. However he left the program on 29 June 2012.

In June 2014, Rochford joined the Seven Network as the network's National Medical Editor, after leaving Network Ten the week earlier. He will appear on various Seven programs.

=== Radio ===
On 4 January 2011, Claire Hooper and Rochford formed a new breakfast show on radio station Mix 106.5 called The Brighter Side of Breakfast.

== References and notes ==
Preceded by Originator	Breakfast; Co-host with Paul Henry & Kathryn Robinson; February 2012 – June 2012	Succeeded by Paul Henry & Kathryn Robinson (as duo)
Preceded by Lisa Wilkinson	What's Good For You; Host; 2009	Succeeded by Program ended
