= Brett Finch =

Australian rugby league footballer

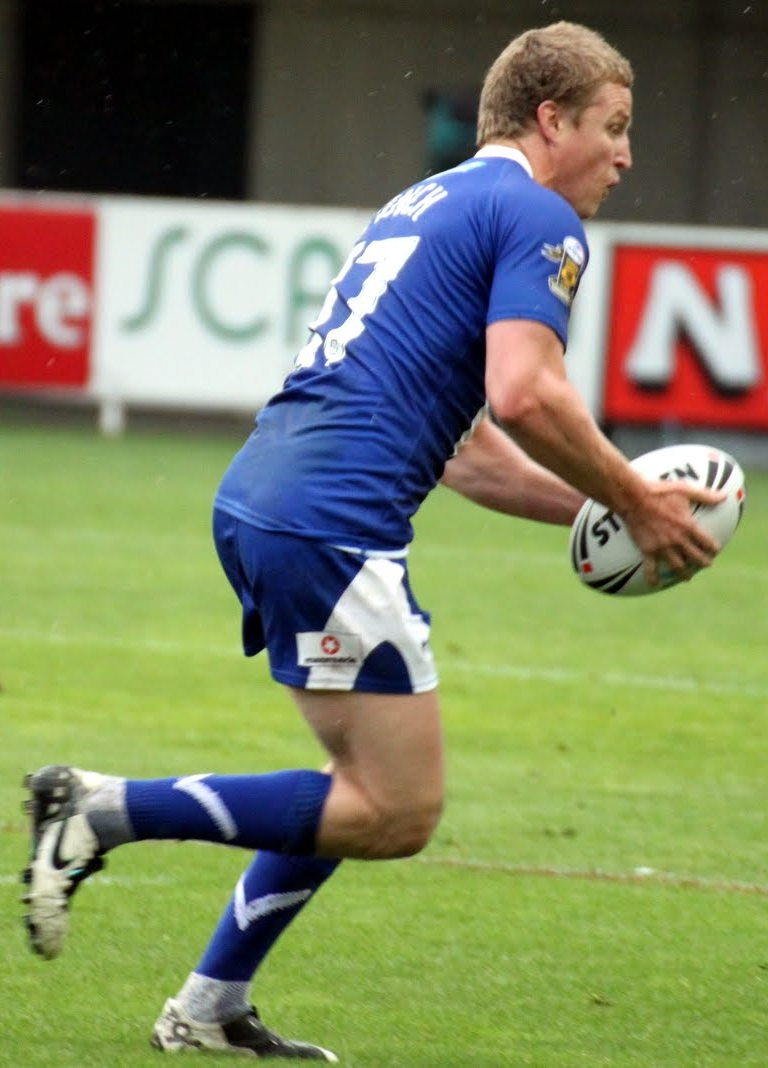

Personal information
- Full name: Brett John Finch
- Born: 20 August 1981 (age 45) Maitland, New South Wales, Australia

Playing information
- Height: 183 cm (6 ft 0 in)
- Weight: 89 kg (14 st 0 lb)
- Position: Five-eighth, Halfback
Club
Years	Team	Pld	T	G	FG	P
1999–02	Canberra Raiders	70	22	0	2	90
2003–06	Sydney Roosters	95	31	0	6	130
2007–09	Parramatta Eels	51	7	0	2	30
2009–10	Melbourne Storm	41	6	1	2	28
2011–12	Wigan Warriors	60	18	0	0	72
2013	Melbourne Storm	13	0	0	0	0
	Total	330	84	1	12	350
Representative
Years	Team	Pld	T	G	FG	P
2004–06	New South Wales	3	1	0	1	5
2005	Prime Minister's XIII	1	1	0	0	4
2006–08	Country NSW	2	0	0	0	0
2010	NRL All Stars	1	0	0	0	0
- Education: Erindale College
- Father: Robert Finch

Brett John Finch (born 20 August 1981) is an Australian former professional rugby league footballer who played in the 1990s, 2000s, and 2010s. A New South Wales State of Origin representative half back, he played in the National Rugby League for Australian clubs the Canberra Raiders, Sydney Roosters, Parramatta Eels and Melbourne Storm. Finch also played in the Super League for English club the Wigan Warriors (with whom he won the 2011 Challenge Cup Final).

== Background ==
Born in Maitland, New South Wales, Australia, Finch is the son of former player and coach Robert Finch. Robert coached the Newcastle Knights reserve grade side in the early 1990s, leading them to consecutive grand final appearances in 1993 and 1994. During this period Brett served as a ball boy for the Knights in their formative years.

He was later educated at Erindale College, where he represented the 1998 Australian Schoolboys. He was a Hunter Mariners junior, playing for the Valentine Devils.

== Playing career ==
At the Canberra Raiders, Finch won the club's Rookie of the Year award in 1999. He debuted earlier in that year against the Melbourne Storm in round 14 as a 17-year-old.

Finch joined the Sydney Roosters in 2003. As 2002 NRL premiers, the Roosters travelled to England for the 2003 World Club Challenge against Super League champions, St Helens R.F.C. Finch played from the interchange bench in Sydney's victory. In 2004, whilst playing for the Sydney Roosters, Finch threw a bottle back into the crowd after he was pelted by a Canterbury-Bankstown Bulldogs fan. Finch played for the Sydney Roosters at half back in their 2004 NRL grand final loss to cross-Sydney rivals, Canterbury-Bankstown.

Finch played three State of Origin games for New South Wales after crossing from Canberra. His most famous moment was when he was called into the New South Wales squad on the eve of Game 1 of the 2006 State of Origin series. He then turned out to be a hero by scoring a try, setting up two and by kicking the winning field goal to push New South Wales to a famous 17–16 victory at Telstra Stadium. However, Finch had a disastrous Game II, and was dropped for the decider which New South Wales lost. They also lost the 2006 series for the first time since 2001.

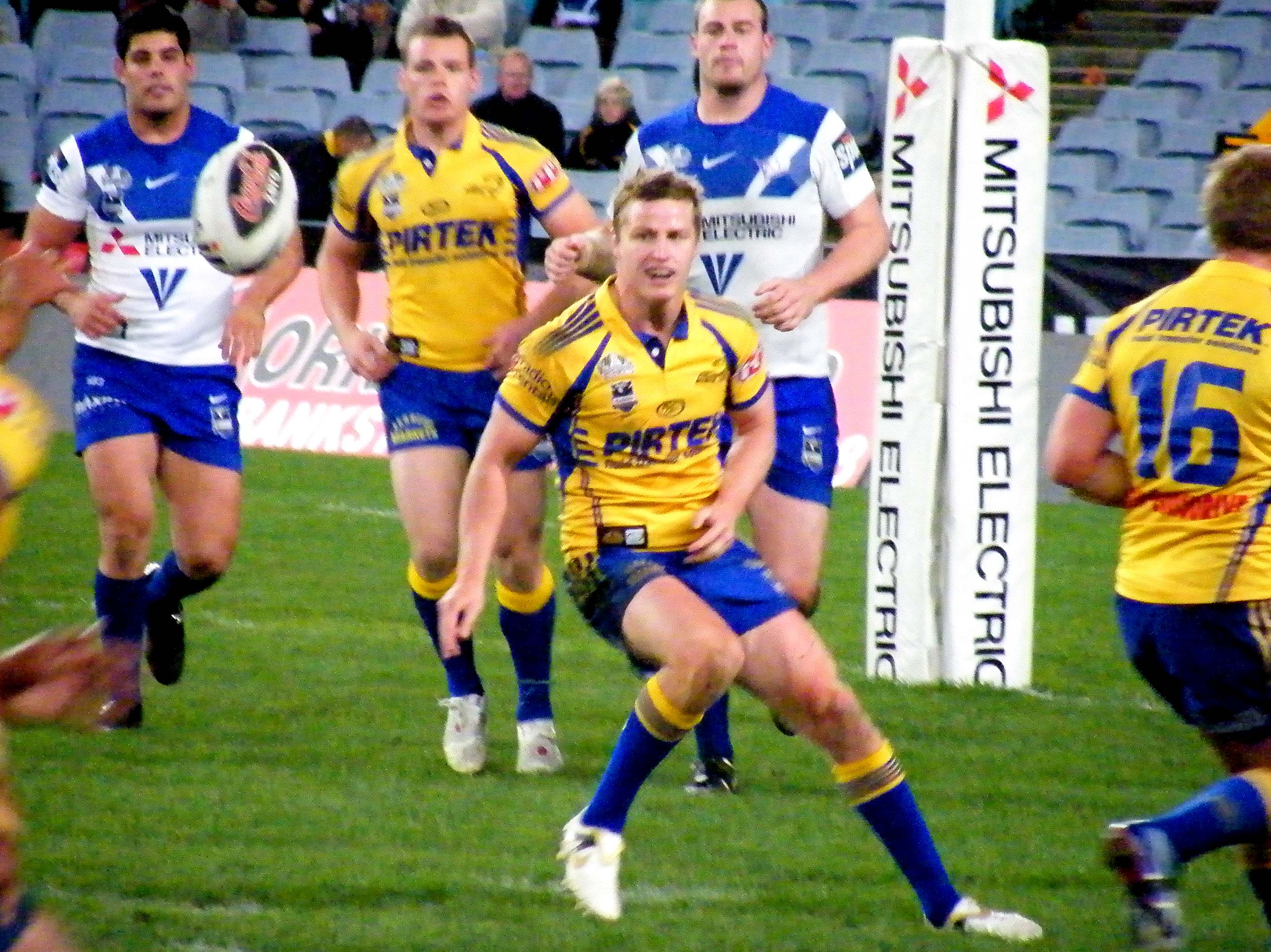
Finch while playing for Parramatta in 2008

The Sydney Roosters and Finch agreed on an early termination of his contract, allowing the Parramatta Eels to sign Finch on a two-year deal from the Roosters, commencing from the 2007 NRL season. The Parramatta club then extended his contract to the end of the 2011 NRL season, reportedly to be worth $1 million for three years.

On 8 April 2009, Parramatta CEO, Denis Fitzgerald, confirmed that Finch would be released from his contract with Parramatta. The contract was not due to expire until the end of the 2011 NRL season. Finch is quoted in media sources as stating that coach Daniel Anderson told him he "may not be the right person to take the club forward in the halfback position".

On 14 April 2009, Finch signed a one-year contract with the Melbourne Storm, his fourth club in eleven NRL seasons. Melbourne coach Craig Bellamy commented: "He will add depth and experience to our squad and gives us further options in the halves."

He got his revenge beating his old team, Parramatta, in the 2009 NRL Grand Final, setting up two tries. However, the NRL later discovered significant salary cap breaches and stripped the Melbourne club of this win. This made it third time unlucky for Finch, having lost two Grand Finals with the Roosters (2003 and 2004). Despite the club being stripped of the 2009 premiership, Finch maintained the belief years later that their grand final victory was legitimate and that he is a premiership winning player.

In July 2010, Finch signed with then Super League champions, Wigan. The deal began with the 2011 season and continued through the 2012 season. Finch did not make his début for Wigan until 25 March 2011 in the home defeat by Warrington in round 7 of the super league, where Finch scored Wigan's only try. Finch missed the start of the season due to a thigh injury which saw him miss 6 games for the Wigan, including fiveSuper League games and the 2011 World Club Challenge defeat by St. George Illawarra.

Finch played in the 2011 Challenge Cup Final 28–18 victory over Leeds at Wembley Stadium.

After his two-year stint at Wigan, Finch returned to the Melbourne Storm for the 2013 NRL season. He joined the team as a back-up to halves pairing Cooper Cronk and Gareth Widdop.

== Post playing ==
After retiring at the end of 2013, Finch worked as a sideline commentator on the Nine Network NRL coverage between 2014 and 2016, as well as semi-regular appearances as a panellist on The NRL Footy Show. He departed Nine and radio station 2GB at the end of 2016, after spending time in a addiction rehabilitation centre in Thailand. Nine and 2GB cut ties with Finch, who at times was employed as a traffic controller in Melbourne.

In 2017, Finch began working for Fox Sports, appearing on Fox League show The Professor's Second Year Syndrome.

In January 2018 Finch married his partner of five years Elli Johnston, who in 2019 gave birth to the couple's only daughter. In May 2023, it was reported that the two were "no longer together".

On 24 October 2019, The Sydney Morning Herald reported that Finch checked himself into a mental health facility after an incident on an interstate flight. Concerns were raised after Finch was seen asleep with a bloody nose on a flight from Sydney to the Gold Coast. One witness was quoted as saying "He looked like he couldn’t bring himself to get off the plane. White as a ghost, couldn’t control his runny nose and (appeared) paranoid. He wasn’t abusive. He just didn’t want to get off the plane, like he was scared about something".

In late September, Finch joined the YKTR Sports organisation, run by former rugby league player Isaac John. On 30 September, Finch launched his podcast, Brett Finch Uncensored, with Brad Fittler featuring as his first guest. The podcast ran independently to YKTR Sports.

In 2024, it was reported that Finch had been working at a forklift training centre. Prior to this, Finch had been living off centrelink after struggling to obtain work following his conviction.

== Child abuse material ==
On 14 December 2021, Finch was arrested and charged with five counts of sharing child abuse material. In May 2022, NSW Police laid an additional two charges which included using a carriage service to make available child abuse material. In August 2022, Finch pleaded guilty to one count of using a carriage service to make available child abuse material. The other charges were dropped. On 23 November 2022, Finch avoided a custodial sentence and was handed a two-year community sentence. A conviction was recorded with Finch also needing to obey strict probation conditions along with seeing a psychologist for a 12-month period.
