= Fox Cricket =

Australian subscription television channel

- Country: Australia

Programming
- Language: English
- Picture format: 1080i (HDTV)

Ownership
- Owner: Fox Sports Pty Limited
- Sister channels: Fox Sports News; Fox League; Fox Footy; Fox Netball; Fox Sports

History
- Launched: 17 September 2018; 8 years ago
- Replaced: Fox Sports 501

Links
- Website: foxsports.com.au

Availability

Streaming media
- Foxtel Go: Channel 501
- Kayo Sports: Channel 501

Fox Cricket is an Australian subscription television channel dedicated to screening cricket (both domestic and international) matches and related programming. It is owned by Fox Sports Pty Limited and is available throughout Australia on Foxtel. The channel was launched on 17 September 2018.

== History ==
Since its launch in 1995 as Premier Sports Network, Fox Sports has been broadcaster to most of Australian international tours despite lacking domestic Australian international rights which has been a mainstay at the Nine Network since 1979. The first major cricket event that was broadcast on PSN was Australia's tour of the West Indies in 1995 which was also the first on pay television in Australia. Nine who up to 1995 had broadcast on free-to-air had tried to keep off PTV under Australia's anti-siphoning rules, which rules that certain events cannot be screened exclusively on pay television. Ultimately a deal was signed with Network Ten to the broadcast series on FTA while also being on PTV with PSN. From 2005/06 to 2012/13 Fox Sports had exclusive rights to domestic cricket in Australia including most or all of the then Ford Ranger One-Day cup and KFC Big Bash T20 matches including the first 2 seasons of the Big Bash League along with the final of the Sheffield Shield, Fox also had highlights of international men's Test, ODI and T20 matches in Australia. In 2013, Fox Sports lost the rights of the BBL to Network Ten and the Ryobi One-Day Cup to the Nine Network for the next 5 years with international cricket in Australia remaining on Nine. Most overseas cricket broadcast stayed on Fox except for Ashes tours of England which Nine had exclusive rights to while the 2015 ICC Cricket World Cup which was held in Australia was broadcast on Fox Sports along with Nine.

In April 2018, Fox Sports came to a six-year agreement with Cricket Australia that expanded their previous coverage of cricket on the Foxtel platform. This deal formed a part of Cricket Australia's six year overall coverage deal which also includes free to air coverage by the Seven Network.

In early May, Foxtel announced the upcoming creation of a dedicated channel, Fox Cricket, featuring the entire Australian Summer of international cricket from 2018 and 2019 including tests, one day matches and T20 matches as well as the Big Bash Leagues and World Cups. The channel debuted on 17 September 2018, with the 2018 Caribbean Premier League final being the first live match broadcast.

In September 2026, Foxtel announced that the channel will be rebranded as Kayo Cricket in 2027, as part of a corporate rebranding of Fox Sports under the Kayo Sports name.

== Programming ==
=== Event coverage ===
Sports programming on Fox Cricket includes the following:

Australian national cricket team

- International Test Cricket (shared with Seven Network)
- One-day Internationals
- Twenty20 Internationals
- International Women's Test Cricket (shared with Seven Network)
- Women's One-day Internationals (shared with Seven Network)
- Women's Twenty20 Internationals (shared with Seven Network)
- Australia A tour matches

Australian domestic leagues

- Sheffield Shield selected matches including final
- Marsh One-Day Cup, selected matches including finals
- BBL every game including finals (shared with Seven Network)
- WBBL every game including finals (shared with Seven Network)

Home series of other national teams

- England cricket team
- West Indies cricket team
- New Zealand cricket team
- South African cricket team
- Indian cricket team

Other tournaments

- Super Smash
- Indian Premier League
- Murgitroyd Twenty20
- SA20
- T20 Blast
- Caribbean Premier League
- Lanka Premier League
- Bangladesh Premier League
- Dutch Twenty20
- Pakistan Super League
- Major League Cricket
- International League T20
- Global T20
- Nepal T20 League
- Inter-Provincial Trophy
- Hong Kong T20 Blitz
- 20 Series

==== Special events ====
- Australian Cricket Awards

=== News and analysis programming ===
Fox Cricket will air several studio shows including the programs listed below:

- B4 The Bash! (2018–2020)
- Come In Spinner (2018–2020)
- Crash The Bash (2016–2020)
- Cricket 360 (2018–2019)
- Cricket A.M. (2018–present)
- Cricket Legends (2015–present, no new episodes)
- Fox Cricket Classics (2018–present, highlights from yesteryear but no studio elements)
- Tea For Two (2018–2020)
- Test Cricket Live On Fox (2018–2020)
- Test Day (2018–2020)
- The Big Break (2018–present)
- The Blast (2019–present)
- The Cricket Tragic (2018–2018)
- The Night Watchmen (2018–2020)

== Personnel ==
Media outlets announced a number of key hosting and commentary personnel in the lead up to the 2018–19 cricket season.

Network personalities and the media attended the launch for Fox Cricket on 9 October 2018. Further key hosting personnel were announced, in addition to new programming for the forthcoming summer.

=== Commentators ===
- Alex Blackwell (Expert Analyst, 2018–present)
- Allan Border (Expert Analyst, 1999–present)
- Stuart Clark (Expert Analyst, 2020/21–present)
- Adam Gilchrist (Host, Caller & Expert Analyst, 2018–present)
- Isa Guha (Host, Caller, 2018–present)
- Brad Haddin (Expert Analyst, 2019–present)
- Mark Howard (Host, Caller, 2018–present)
- Michael Hussey (Expert Analyst, 2018–present)
- Mel Jones (Caller & Expert Analyst, 2018–present)
- Brendon Julian (Host, Caller, 2004–present)
- Brett Lee (Caller & Expert Analyst, 2018–present)
- Darren Lehmann (Expert Analyst, 2018–present)
- Morne Morkel (Expert Analyst, 2021/22–present)
- Chris Lynn (Expert Analyst, 2019–present)
- Kerry O'Keeffe (Expert Analyst, 2017–present)
- Adam Peacock (Caller, 2019–present)
- Rob Quiney (Expert Analyst, 2018–present)
- Ian Smith (caller, 2019–20, 2022–present)
- Brenton Speed (Caller, 2021–present)
- Michael Vaughan (Expert Analyst, 2013, 2018–present)
- David Warner (Expert Analyst, 2019–present)
- Mark Waugh (Expert Analyst, 2005–2013, 2018–present)

=== International commentators ===
- Wasim Akram (expert analyst, 2019, 2023–24)
- Russel Arnold (expert analyst, 2019)
- Harsha Bhogle (caller, 2018–present)
- Brian Lara (expert analyst, 2022, 2024)
- Shaun Pollock (expert analyst, 2022/23)
- Ravi Shastri (expert Analyst, 2023–present)
- Graeme Smith (expert analyst, 2018)
- Ian Smith (caller, 2019–20)

=== Presenters ===
- Megan Barnard (Host, Reporter, 2018–present)
- Sarah Jones (Host, 2009–2013, 2015, 2018–present)
- Kath Loughnan (Host, Reporter, 2018–present)

=== Former commentators ===
- John Hastings (Expert Analyst, 2018–19)
- Ian Healy (Expert Analyst, 2018–19)
- Mitchell Johnson (Expert Analyst, 2018–19)
- Neroli Meadows (Host, Reporter, 2015–19)
- Shane Warne (Expert Analyst, 2018–2022)
- Tom Morris (Caller, Reporter 2018–2022)
- Andrew Symonds (Expert Analyst, 2011–2013, 2018–2022)

=== Hosts ===
The Big Break

- Mark Howard (2018–present)
- Isa Guha (2018–present)

Come In Spinner

- Mark Howard (2018–present)
- Kerry O'Keeffe (2018–present)

Test Day

- Isa Guha (2018–present)
- Brendon Julian (2019–present)

Cricket Legends

- Robert 'Crash' Craddock (2015–present)

Cricket A.M.

- Jim Callinan (2018–present)
- Kath Loughnan (2019–present)
- Neroli Meadows (2018–2019)

Crash The Bash

- Lee Carseldine (2016–present)

Fox Cricket Classics

- Mark Howard (2018–present)

The Cricket Tragic

- Gus Worland (2018–present)

The Blast

- Megan Barnard (2019–present)
- Mel Jones (2019–present)

The Night Watchmen

- James 'The Professor' Rochford (2018–present)
- Andrew 'Barney' Barnett (2018–present)
- Nick Rado (2019–present)
- Sam Taunton (2018–2019)
- Kath Loughnan (2018–2019)

== Commentators ==
=== Men's internationals ===
Current

- Allan Border (Expert Analyst) 2018/19–
- Adam Gilchrist (Host, Caller & Expert Analyst) 2018/19–
- Isa Guha (Host, Caller) 2018/19–
- Brad Haddin (Expert Analyst) 2019/20–
- Mark Howard (Host, Caller) 2018/19–
- Michael Hussey (Expert Analyst) 2018/19–
- Mel Jones (Caller & Expert Analyst) 2018/19–
- Brendon Julian (Host, Caller) 2018/19–
- Brett Lee (Caller & Expert Analyst) 2018/19–
- Kath Loughnan (Reporter) 2019/20–present
- Kerry O'Keeffe (Expert Analyst) 2018/19–
- Ian Smith (Expert Analyst) 2019/20–
- Michael Vaughan (Expert Analyst) 2018/19–2019/20, 2021/22–present
- Mark Waugh (Expert Analyst) 2018/19–

Past

- Wasim Akram (International Expert Analyst) 2019/20
- Russel Arnold (International Expert Analyst) 2018/19
- Harsha Bhogle (International Caller) 2018/19, 2020/21
- Ian Healy (Expert Analyst) 2018/19
- Neroli Meadows (Reporter) 2018/19
- Graeme Smith (International Expert Analyst) 2018/19
- Andrew Symonds (Expert Analyst) 2018/19–2021/22
- Shane Warne (Expert Analyst) 2018/19–2021/22
- David Warner (Expert Analyst, 2018/19)

=== Women's internationals ===
Current

- Megan Barnard (Host) 2018/19–
- Alex Blackwell (Analysis) 2018/19–
- Mel Jones (Analysis) 2018/19–
- Kirby Short (Analysis) 2021/22–

Past

- Sarah Aley (Analysis) 2020/21
- Elyse Villani 2020/21

=== Australian domestic limited-overs cricket tournament ===
Present

- Brendon Julian (Host) 2018/19–
- Adam Peacock (Caller) 2019/20–
- Brenton Speed (Caller) 2021/22–
- Kerry O'Keeffe (Expert Analyst) 2018/19–
- Morne Morkel (Expert Analyst) 2021/22–
- Stuart Clark (Expert Analyst) 2021/22–

Past

- Allan Border (Expert Analyst) 2018/19–
- Brad Haddin (Expert Analyst) 2019/20–
- Mark Howard (Host, Caller) 2018/19–
- Michael Hussey (Expert Analyst) 2018/19–
- Mel Jones (Caller & Expert Analyst) 2018/19–
- Brett Lee (Caller & Expert Analyst) 2018/19–
- Andrew Symonds (Expert Analyst) 2018/19–
- Mark Waugh (Expert Analyst 2018/19–
- John Hastings (Expert Analyst, 2018/19–
- Alyssa Healy (Expert Analyst, 2018/19–
- Darren Lehmann (Expert Analyst, 2018–present)
- Chris Lynn (Expert Analyst, 2019–present)
- Corbin Middlemas (Caller, 2019/20)
- Tom Morris (Caller, 2018–present)
- Rob Quiney (Expert Analyst, 2018–present)

=== Big Bash League ===
Present

- Callum Ferguson (Expert Analyst, 2019–present), Big Bash
- John Hastings (Expert Analyst, 2018–present) Marsh Cup
- Alyssa Healy (Expert Analyst, 2018–present) Marsh Cup
- Darren Lehmann (Expert Analyst, 2018–present)
- Chris Lynn (Expert Analyst, 2019–present)
- Corbin Middlemas (Caller, 2019–present)
- Adam Peacock (Caller, 2019–present)
- Rob Quiney (Expert Analyst, 2018–present)

=== Women's Big Bash League ===
Current

- Megan Barnard (Host/Sideline Reporter) 2018/19–
- Mel Jones (Host/Caller/Expert Commentator/Analysis) 2018/19–
- Brenton Speed (Caller) 2021/22–
- Ben Homer (Caller) 2021/22–
- Alex Blackwell (Expert Commentator) 2018/19–
- Erin Burns (Expert Commentator/Analysis) 2020/21–
- Morne Morkel (Expert Commentator) 2021/22–
- Mel Farrell (Expert Commentator) 2021/22–
- Adam Peacock (Caller) 2021/22–

Past

- Isa Guha (Host) 2018/19–2019/20
- Ian Healy (Analysis) 2018/19
- Meg Lanning (Analysis) 2018/19
- Holly Ferling (Sideline Reporter) 2019/20
- Molly Strano (Analysis) 2020/21

=== World cups ===
2018 Women's T20 World Cup

- Neroli Meadows (Host)
- Alex Blackwell (Analysis)
- Mel Jones (Analysis)
- Darren Lehmann (Analysis)
- Isa Guha (Host/Analysis)
- Alex Blackwell (Analysis)

2019 Cricket World Cup

- Brendon Julian (Host)
- Tom Morris (Host)
- Andrew Symonds (Analysis)
- Allan Border (Analysis)
- Mark Waugh (Analysis)
- Adam Gilchrist (Analysis)
- Brett Lee (Analysis)
- Kerry O'Keeffe (Analysis)
- Chris Lynn (Analysis)

2020 Women's T20 World Cup

- Megan Barnard (Host)
- Mel Jones (Host/Analysis)
- Isa Guha (Host/Analysis)
- Alex Blackwell (Analysis)

2021 Men's T20 World Cup

- Brendon Julian (Host)
- Mark Waugh (Analysis)
- Kerry O'Keeffe (Analysis)
- Brett Lee (Analysis)
- Brad Haddin (Analysis)

== See also ==
- Fox League
- Fox Footy
- Fox Netball
- Fox Sports
- List of sports television channels
