= Lara Pitt =

Australian television presenter and sports journalist

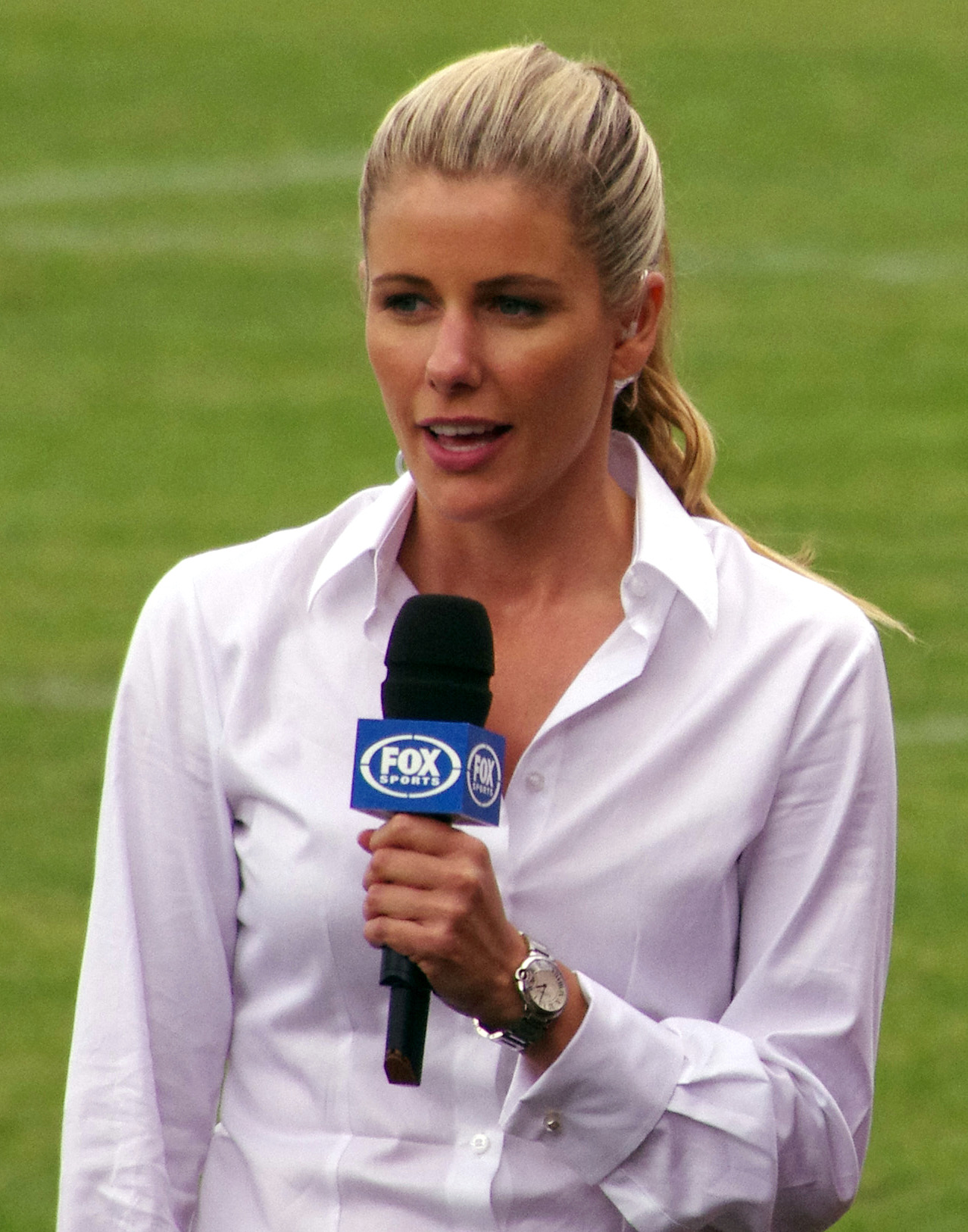
- Pitt in 2013
- Born: Lara Pitt
- Education: University of New South Wales; University of Technology Sydney
- Occupation: Sports journalist
- Years active: 2006−present
- Known for: Fox Sports; Monday Night with Matty Johns
- Spouse: Anthony Pitt

Lara Pitt is an Australian television presenter and sports journalist, mainly known for reporting for Fox Sports on their NRL coverage and Monday Night with Matty Johns.

== Early life ==
Pitt completed a Bachelor of Commerce Marketing & Tourism Management degree at the University of New South Wales and a Business Diploma in Event Management at University of Technology Sydney.

== Career ==
Pitt began her career at Fox in 2006, and joined Fox Sports News in 2007. Pitt was a regular contributor to Fox Sports A-League coverage in 2010 as a reporter.

During her time on Fox, Pitt worked on NRL Super Saturday, NRL Tonight and Monday Night with Matty Johns. Currently, she is on the weekly League Life panel, is a part of Fox League's weekly podcast, along with Matthew Russell and Warren Smith and relieves on the Sunday Ticket. Pitt is also occasionally a sideline reporter during matches.

== Personal life ==
Lara Pitt is married to Anthony Pitt and they have two sons together named Lachlan and Cooper. Pitt's nephew is professional rugby union player Josh Kemeny.
