= Bryan Fletcher (rugby league) =

Australia international rugby league footballer (born 1974)

Bryan "Fletch" Fletcher
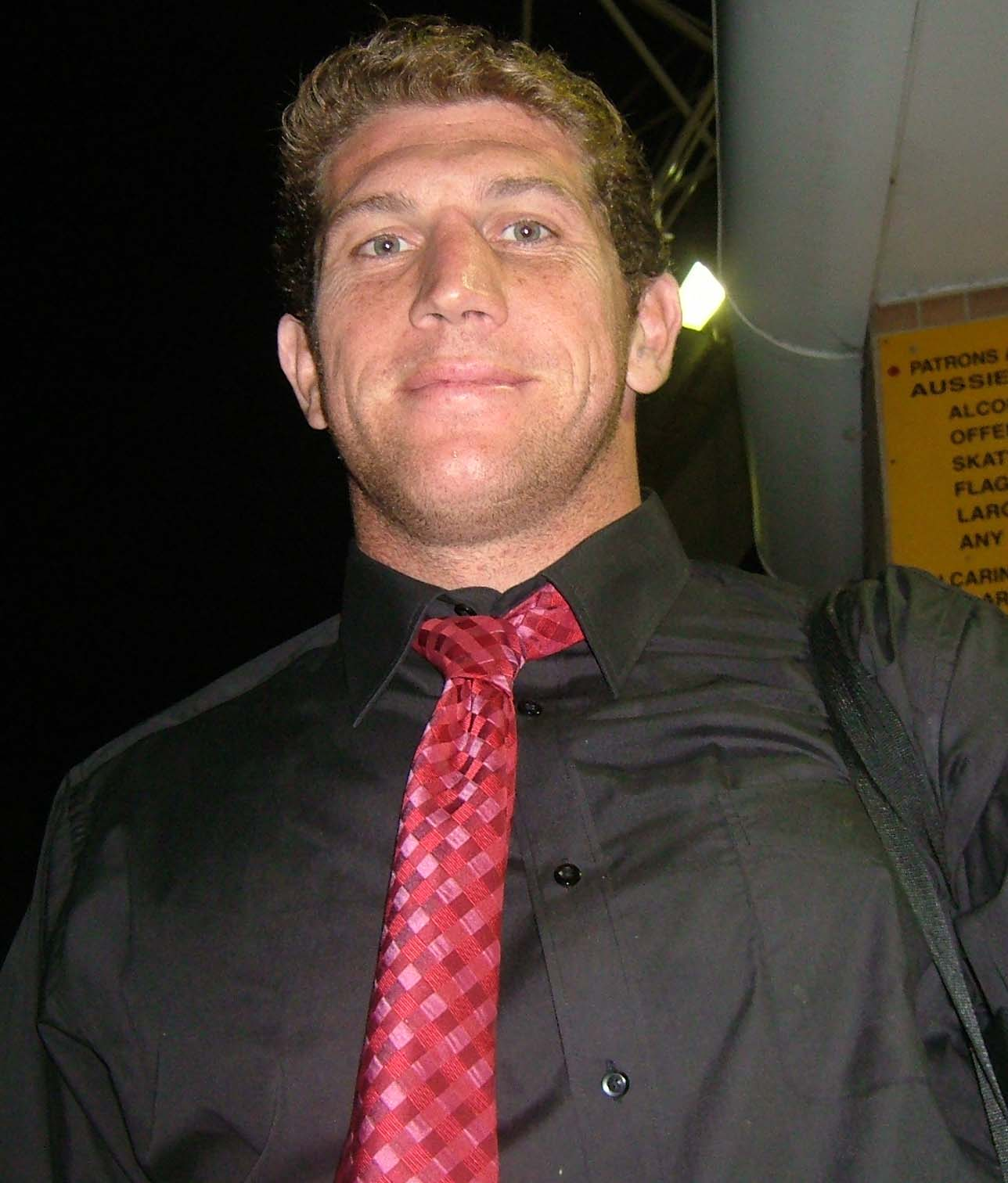

Personal information
- Full name: Bryan Nathan Fletcher
- Born: 12 April 1974 (age 52) Sydney, New South Wales, Australia

Playing information
- Height: 190 cm (6 ft 3 in)
- Weight: 105 kg (16 st 7 lb)
- Position: Second-row
Club
| Years | Team | Pld | T | G | FG | P |
|---|---|---|---|---|---|---|
| 1997–02 | Sydney Roosters | 125 | 21 | 0 | 0 | 84 |
| 2003–05 | South Sydney | 45 | 15 | 0 | 0 | 60 |
| 2006–07 | Wigan Warriors | 55 | 14 | 0 | 0 | 56 |
| | Total | 225 | 50 | 0 | 0 | 200 |
Representative
| Years | Team | Pld | T | G | FG | P |
| 1998–99 | City NSW | 2 | 0 | 0 | 0 | 0 |
| 1998–03 | New South Wales | 14 | 1 | 0 | 0 | 4 |
| 1999–03 | Australia | 13 | 6 | 0 | 0 | 24 |

Bryan Fletcher (born 12 April 1974) is an Australian former professional rugby league footballer who played in the 1990s and 2000s. A New South Wales State of Origin and Australian international representative second-row-forward, he played his club football in Australia with the Sydney Roosters and the South Sydney Rabbitohs, before a stint in England with Wigan.

== Sydney Roosters ==
Fletcher's junior club was the Paddington Colts in the Eastern Suburbs District Junior Rugby League. He started his top-level career at the Sydney Roosters in the second row in the 1997 ARL season. Despite only 24 National Rugby League appearances, Fletcher was selected for the Australian team to compete in the end of season 1999 Rugby League Tri-Nations tournament. In the final against New Zealand he played at second-row forward in the Kangaroos' 22-20 victory. Over the years Fletcher would gain 13 caps for the Australian national side and also play 14 games for New South Wales in the State of Origin matches.

One of the highlights of Fletcher's Sydney Roosters career was his appearance at second-row forward in the 2000 NRL Grand Final, their first in 20 years. He also helped Australia inflict a humiliating defeat on the New Zealand national team 52–0 as well as a 3–0 whitewash of Queensland in the State of Origin series. Fletcher is perhaps best known in Origin circles for his hand grenade try celebration which he performed in 2000 series where NSW thumped QLD 56-16. It is believed that the try celebration forced Queensland to change their whole strategy towards Origin and it created a pathway for Queensland to win fourteen of eighteen series since 2006 (including a record eight straight between 2006 and 2013). Former Queensland player Wendell Sailor said “As a Queenslander, you never forget that". Queensland Origin great Gorden Tallis had previously spoken about how that try celebration eventually led to a shift in the State of Origin balance of power which saw Queensland win back the Shield in 2001. Former player Matthew Johns claims that the try celebration started a Queensland dynasty. Former Queensland coach Chris Close spoke about Fletcher's try celebration in 2016 "I thought it was disgraceful act and a disgraceful show of disrespect, You would certainly never, ever see that from any Queensland team, It still burns. F---ing oath it does".

Fletcher achieved even more success in the 2002 season. He played for the Roosters from the interchange bench in their 30-8 win over the New Zealand Warriors in the 2002 NRL Grand Final in front of 80,130 fans at the Telstra Stadium. He scored the final try in the 74th minute in what was his 125th and final appearance for the red, white and blue, before moving to rivals the South Sydney Rabbitohs.

== South Sydney Rabbitohs ==
Fletcher left the Roosters and moved to perennial strugglers the South Sydney Rabbitohs in 2003. Fletcher was soon installed as the club's captain after signing due to his playing pedigree. In 2003 he won the George Piggins Medal as the club's best and fairest player of the season.

The Rabbitohs' captaincy was stripped from him after an altercation on the pitch with Parramatta Eels player Dean Widders in which Fletcher made a racist comment towards Widders. It turned out to be the turning point in the Rabbitohs' season, with Ashley Harrison taking the captaincy from him and the Rabbitohs winning most of their matches under him in a late season surge which saw them avoid a third consecutive wooden spoon.

He later apologised for the event, saying: "I apologise unreservedly for comments that I made to Dean Widders in yesterday's game. The comments were totally unacceptable and for that I am sorry. "My actions have set a very poor example for kids who follow Rugby League and these types of comments cannot be tolerated in our game."

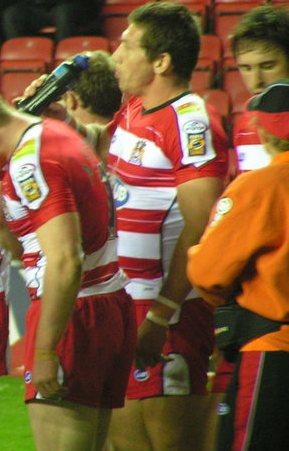
Fletcher playing for Wigan on 4 September 2007

== Wigan Warriors ==
Before the scandal that led to Fletcher being stripped of his captaincy, banned for 1 game and fined A$10,000 he had agreed to a move to England to play for Super League club; Wigan Warriors after three years at Souths. Fletcher joined the Wigan club in 2006 in time for the pre season training but was sidelined for the opening four rounds of Super League after needing emergency Bowel Surgery in early January.

Fletcher's début came against Warrington Wolves on 10 March 2006 at the JJB Stadium in Wigan, and made an instant impact as a substitute scoring his first try three minutes into his first appearance. He was one of the stalwarts that helped Wigan through one of the most tumultuous times in the club's history on and off the field in 2006 with the dismissal of coach Ian Millward, the low morale within the team and seeing the once feared Wigan club sitting at the bottom of the table. Thanks to Fletcher's impact in the Second-row and the Prop positions Wigan managed the seemingly impossible and survived relegation from the Super League, finishing 7th and just missing a playoff place to local rivals Warrington.

== Playing statistics ==
At the end of the 2007 Super League season, Bryan Fletcher retired from competitive rugby league. He had played in 125 games for the Sydney Roosters, 45 for Souths, and a further 55 for Wigan. He also played 2 games for City Origin, 14 State of Origin games for NSW and 13 Test and World Cup matches for Australia.

== Personal life ==
He got married in 2003, to Britt Fletcher. Together they had three daughters, Scarlett, Maya, and Lucca. When he retired from playing in 2007, Fletcher and his business partner Craig Markham began a cleaning company called Cleanfit. The company cleans a number of pubs, clubs and office blocks in Sydney. It also allows Fletcher, who is a qualified plumber, to utilise his trade in order to help with the business.

In 2013, Bryan Fletcher was a regular presenter on Channel 9's weekly football season program The Footy Show. Fletcher presented the "Kick for Cash" segment.

In 2014, Bryan Fletcher joined Fox Sports Monday Night with Matty Johns forming a duo with fellow former NRL player Nathan Hindmarsh. Fletcher and Hindmarsh participate in many challenges set by the producers. 'Fletch and Hindy' created their own spoof NRL bid team known as the "Nepal Donkeys."

In 2019, Bryan was chosen to be part of the core host ensemble for the Unibet Australia weekly television format program "At Odds".

== Controversy ==
In 1998, Fletcher escaped conviction on an assault charge after he was involved in an "ugly brawl" at the Bellevue Hotel during a pub crawl with Roosters teammates. He was ordered to serve an 18–month good behaviour bond at Downing Centre Local Court in May 1998. He was fined "almost his entire salary" by the Roosters for his role in the incident.

In July 2018, Fletcher made the headlines after he was allegedly set up by an Uber driver buying cocaine. The Uber driver reportedly filmed Fletcher in a snapchat video saying "Look who I'm selling bags to …". Fletcher responded with "Don't say that, I don't know who this driver is, we're just hanging out it's Saturday night, I'm just in an Uber". Fletcher's manager Steve Gillis told the media "The driver asked him for a quick Snapchat video he's been set up. "Fletcher told me that he's never met the bloke, he just jumped in the back of his cab and driver pulled this stunt he's clearly been set up".
