= Gorden Tallis =

Australia international rugby league footballer

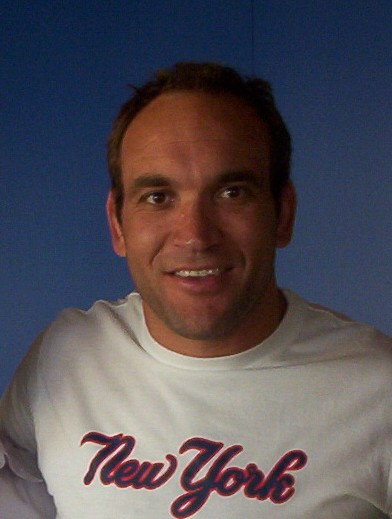

Personal information
- Full name: Gorden James Tallis
- Born: 27 July 1973 (age 53) Townsville, Queensland, Australia

Playing information
- Height: 189 cm (6 ft 2 1/2 in)
- Weight: 107 kg (16 st 12 lb)
- Position: Second-row
Club
Years	Team	Pld	T	G	FG	P
1992–95	St. George Dragons	54	17	1	0	70
1997–04	Brisbane Broncos	160	49	0	0	196
	Total	214	66	1	0	266
Representative
Years	Team	Pld	T	G	FG	P
1994–03	Queensland	17	4	0	0	16
1998–03	Australia	18	9	0	0	36
1997	Queensland (SL)	3	0	0	0	0
1997	Australia (SL)	3	0	0	0	0

Gorden James Tallis (born 27 July 1973), also known by the nickname of "Raging Bull" for his on-field aggression, is an Australian former professional rugby league footballer who played in the 1990s and 2000s. He is currently a commentator and pundit for the Fox Sports network.

A Queensland State of Origin and Australian international representative second-row forward, he captained both these teams as well as the Brisbane Broncos with whom he won the 1997, 1998 and 2000 Grand Finals, after starting his career with the St. George Dragons in Sydney. At the peak of his career Tallis was considered as the best second-row forward in the world and in 2008 was named in an Indigenous Australian rugby league team of the century.

== Background ==
Tallis was born in Townsville, in the North Queensland region of Queensland on 27 July 1973. There he played for the Centrals Tigers club. Tallis' father Wally played rugby league briefly for Leigh in the 1960s, and was the captain of an Indigneous rugby league team that toured New Zealand in 1972/1973.

According to The Courier-Mail in 2021, Tallis identifies as an Indigenous Australian through his paternal ancestry. Tallis' mother is white.

Tallis addressed speculation about his ethnic background in his 2003 autobiography Raging Bull:

People ask me about my ethnic background. Newspapers pick me in their "fantasy" Indigenous and Aboriginal sides. To tell the honest truth, I haven't worried too much about it. An auntie of mine did some research and she found that my great-grandfather came from North Western Ambrym in Vanuatu and my great-grandmother was from Loh Island in the Torres Strait [sic]. All we were ever told in my family was that we were Australians. My dad was born in Townsville and his dad was born in Bowen, so that makes us Australian and we’re proud of it. I have played in one Indigenous side though, the Redfern All Blacks, who won the Aboriginal and Torres Strait Islander tournament in 1992. That was some side. We had Choc Mundine who was about 17, Tricky Trindall who was 25, and Wes Patten who was 19. People might have read a bit into me playing in that tournament but to me it was just a chance to play some footy with my mates.

Aboriginal activist Stephen Hagan interpreted this as meaning that Tallis does not claim to be an Indigenous Australian. Confusion may have come from the fact that Loh Island is located within the Torres Islands of Vanuatu, not Australia's Torres Strait Islands.

Tallis is also understood to have Tongan ancestry.

== Professional playing career ==
=== St George Dragons ===
Tallis moved to Sydney to make his first grade debut in the Winfield Cup premiership for St. George during the 1992 NSWRL season on 29 August, aged 19. In 1992 Tallis also played for NSW City under 19s and NSW Under 19s. At the end of the 1993 NSWRL season he was a reserve in the St George Dragons' Grand final loss to the Brisbane Broncos. Tallis was used off the interchange bench during the 1994 NSWRL season and also that year made his representative debut for the Queensland side, being selected for the 2nd and 3rd games of the 1994 State of Origin series. In 1995 he was included in the Tongan squad for the 1995 World Cup but had to withdraw due to injury.

When the proposed Super League competition was put on hold in 1996, Tallis offered to buy out the final year of his contract with St. George in order to join Brisbane. St. George declined the offer however, and subsequent court action held him to his original contract. Having already signed a Super League contract to play with Brisbane, the fiery North Queenslander caused controversy when he was the only player who chose to sit out the 1996 season rather than play a final year with St. George. After having made 54 appearances for the Red V, he left Sydney.

=== Brisbane Broncos ===
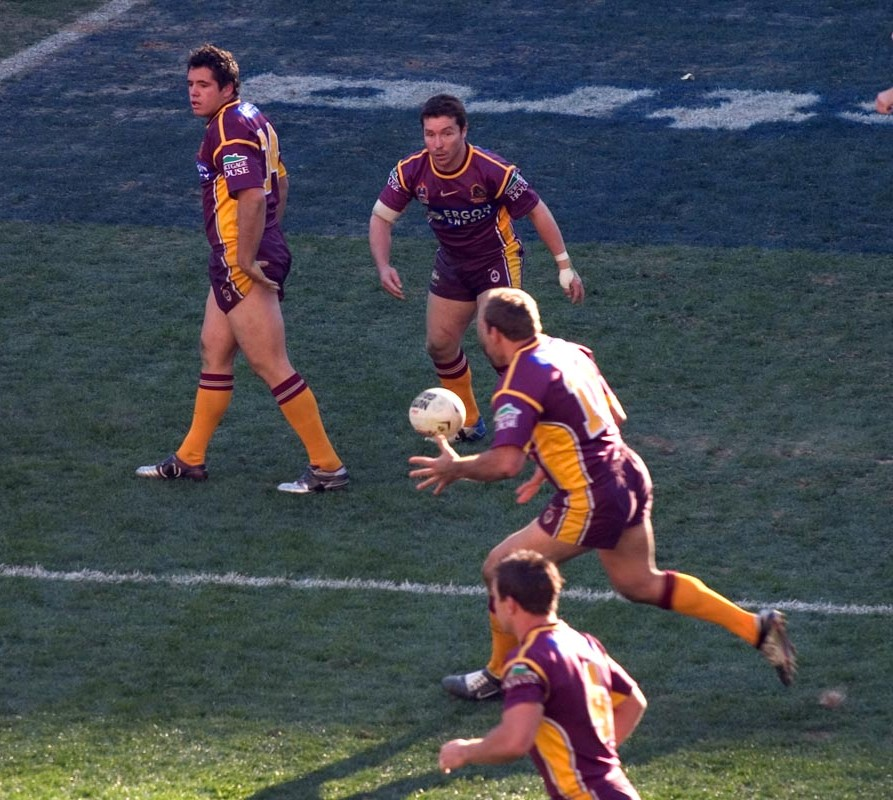
Gorden Tallis about to receive the ball during a Brisbane Broncos match in 2004.

Tallis returned to the game with the Broncos for the 1997 Super League season and was the most dominant forward in the competition, which culminated in Brisbane's crushing 26–8 win over the Cronulla-Sutherland Sharks in the Telstra Cup grand final. In addition to representing Queensland in the Super League Tri-series competition, he made his international debut in the 1997 post season's Super League Test series against Great Britain, playing at second-row forward in all three matches.

during the 1998 NRL season Tallis returned to St. George for the first time since his acrimonious split with the Saints and was pelted with garbage and insults and was loudly booed every time he touched the ball before his try secured a 30–18 victory. He was selected to play for Queensland in Games 2 and 3 of the 1998 State of Origin series. Brisbane went on to capture another premiership with Tallis scoring a try and winning the prestigious Clive Churchill Medal as the best and fairest player on-field in the club's 38–12 1998 NRL grand final win over the Canterbury Bulldogs. Tallis made his Australian Kangaroos Test debut in the second match of the Trans-Tasman series.

He continued his great personal form when chosen for the ANZAC Test in 1999 and spearheaded Queensland's State of Origin campaign, playing in all 3 games of the historic tied 1999 State of Origin series. However, the season ended with Brisbane's failure to defend its premiership and Tallis was ruled out of October's 1999 Tri-Nations because of injury.

2000 saw him score a try in Australia's 52–0 thrashing of New Zealand in the ANZAC Test, but after being sent off in the opening State of Origin match for verbally abusing referee Bill Harrigan, Tallis suffered the ignominy of a whitewash defeat (his public admission that the 'dead' third match of the series should be cancelled was a momentary lapse in judgment that may have indirectly contributed to the Blues' 56–16 win). If Tallis' stature as the most dominant forward in the game wasn't secure following Brisbane's 14–6 win over the Roosters in the 2000 NRL grand final, his four tries in Australia's 82–0 humiliation of Papua New Guinea before the 2000 World Cup, and his selection as Australian captain for the match against Russia (which resulted in a record 110–4 victory) did. In 2000, Tallis also received the Australian Sports Medal. Following Australia's World Cup victory, Tallis and teammate Shane Webcke wrote an open letter to players appealing for an end to scandalous behaviour amongst footballers which had been tarnishing the sport.

==== Captaincy ====
Having won the 2000 NRL Premiership, the Broncos traveled to England to play against 2000's Super League V Champions, St Helens R.F.C. for the 2001 World Club Challenge, with newly appointed captain Tallis playing at second-row forward in Brisbane's loss. Tallis captained a rookie Queensland team in the 34–16 win over New South Wales in the opening match of the 2001 State of Origin series and was named man-of-the-match. Soon after, he suffered a career-threatening neck injury in a club match against the Manly-Warringah Sea Eagles which revealed a spinal condition that required corrective surgery. While Tallis' season was over (despite the smokescreen of his naming on the Broncos' interchange bench for the club's preliminary final) he made a strong return to football in 2002. It was in the deciding match of the 2002 State of Origin series that Gorden Tallis performed a famous tackle on Blues fullback, Brett Hodgson, dragging him several metres and eventually tossing him out of the field of play like a rag-doll. Tallis' reaction later of giving the one-finger salute to a section of the crowd, right behind the northern try-line where Dane Carlaw's series-tying try was scored, became a major after-match talking point. Tallis gained some sympathy when it was revealed that he was objecting to an offensive sign about his mother. But many again raised questions about his capacity to captain Australia with debate raging over the choice between Tallis or Andrew Johns to succeed Brad Fittler. Days later Johns was chosen to lead the Kangaroos in the July Test against Great Britain. Tallis scored a try in Australia's 64–10 win in that match and was later named Test leader (in Johns' absence) for the one-off Test against New Zealand in October, which Australia also won 32–24.

At the end of 2003, Tallis, who was expected to lead Australia on the 2003 Kangaroo tour announced his retirement from representative football, but continued playing with the Broncos. In 2004 he started to feel more affected by his neck injury and took heed of the warning signs his body was emitting. He played his last official match in the 2004 semi-final for the Brisbane Broncos, fittingly in his hometown of Townsville, against the Cowboys, which the Broncos lost. At the time of his retirement, he held the Broncos' club record of most career tries for a forward.

During the 2007 season at the Broncos' 20-year anniversary celebration, the club announced a list of the 20 best players to play for them to date which included Tallis.

In 2010 Tallis was inducted into the Broncos official Hall of Fame.

== Career stats ==
=== NSWRL/ARL/Super League/NRL ===
Season	Team	Appearances	Tries	Goals	Goal-kicking percentage	Field goals	Points
1992 NSWRL Season	St. George Dragons	1	-	-		-	-
1993 NSWRL Season	St. George Dragons	15	1	-		-	4
1994 NSWRL Season	St. George Dragons	17	4	1/1	100%	-	18
1995 ARL Season	St. George Dragons	21	12	0/2	0%	-	48
1997 Super League Season	Brisbane Broncos	19	3	-	-	-	12
1998 NRL Season	Brisbane Broncos	25	8	-	-	-	32
1999 NRL Season	Brisbane Broncos	20	7	-	-	-	28
2000 NRL Season	Brisbane Broncos	23	9	-	-	-	36
2001 NRL Season	Brisbane Broncos	10	3	-	-	-	12
2002 NRL Season	Brisbane Broncos	24	10	-	-	-	40
2003 NRL Season	Brisbane Broncos	18	4	-	-	-	16
2004 NRL Season	Brisbane Broncos	21	5	-	-	-	20

=== Representative ===
Years	Team	Appearances	Tries	Goals	Goal-kicking percentage	Field goals	Points
1994, 1998-2003	Queensland	17	4	-	-	-	16
1997	Queensland (SL)	3	-	-	-	-	-
1997	Australia (SL)	3	-	-	-	-	-
1998-2000, 2002-2003	Australia	13	9	-	-	-	36

== Accolades ==
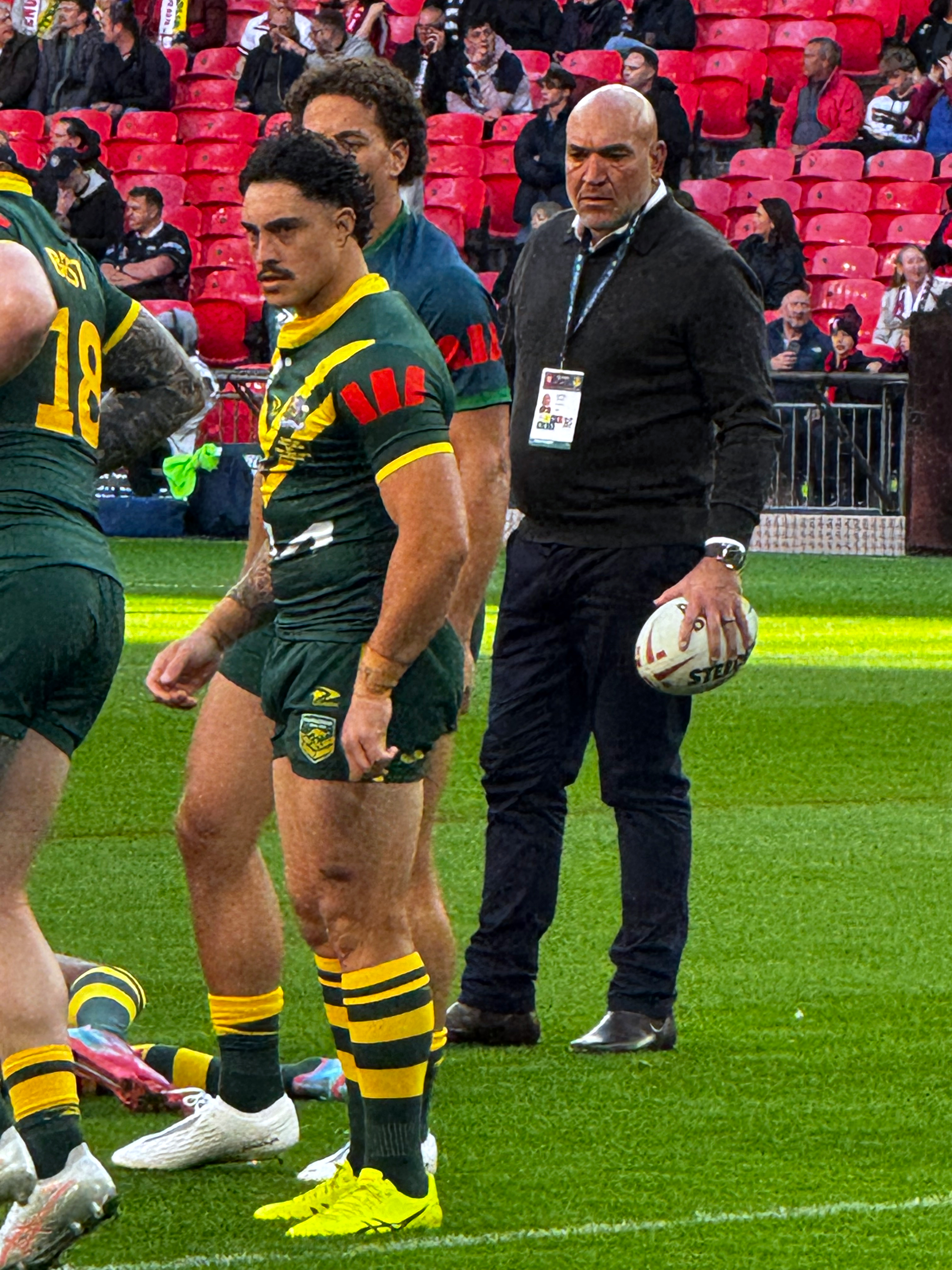
Tallis as part of the Kangaroos staff in 2025

Clive Churchill Medal: 1998

Dally M Second Rower of the Year: 1999

Indigenous Team of the Century: 2008

NRL Team of the 1990s: 2003

== Post-football career ==
In 2005 Tallis was appointed as one of News Ltd's members on the NRL board, replacing John Brass but stood down from the role in 2008, amid speculation that he will join the coaching staff of Catalans Dragons. He was a director on the board of the North Queensland Cowboys, a role he had to relinquish when he joined the South Sydney Rabbitohs as a forwards coach. He was brought in by Russell Crowe to add his knowledge and aggression to the team. Tallis commentates games for Fox Sports, as well as providing written columns for newspapers. Tallis has made his views on fighting clear on the Fox Sports broadcasts of Rugby League, stating that if a fight erupts, "he would run in, you would run in, we would all run in, because it's your mate getting bashed".

During the 2010 NRL season after it was announced that South Sydney Rabbitohs head coach John Lang would be retiring, incoming replacement coach Michael Maguire from the Wigan Warriors announced that Tallis' services as forwards coach were no longer required.

In 2016, Tallis was immortalised with a Gord-e-moji emoji keyboard, in the same vein as his contemporary Kim Kardashian's "Kimoji". The app was developed for iOS by Devotion Digital in Sydney, with plans to roll out an Android version later in 2016.

In 2018, Tallis was inducted into the Australian Rugby League Hall of Fame.

In August 2019, Tallis called for the NRL to relocate Sydney teams and called crowds at Sydney games as "Embarrassing". Tallis went on to say "Could the NRL put in some key performance indicators to move one of the Sydney teams?, It’s got to go on fans", he said. "It’s got to go on filling a stadium. It’s got to go on people wanting to watch you, coming through the gate to pay to watch your brand, your style of football, Sydney Roosters are on top of the table and count their fans with a fork to get their numbers up, There’s nothing worse when you watch a game of footy and there’s no one there, you get embarrassed".

Tallis co-hosts Triple M Radio Brisbane's sports segment. In 2024, Tallis joined NRL 360 on Fox League replacing Paul Kent.

Preceded by Allan Langer	Australia national rugby league team captain 2000-2002	Succeeded by Andrew Johns
