= Nathan Hindmarsh =

Australia international rugby league footballer

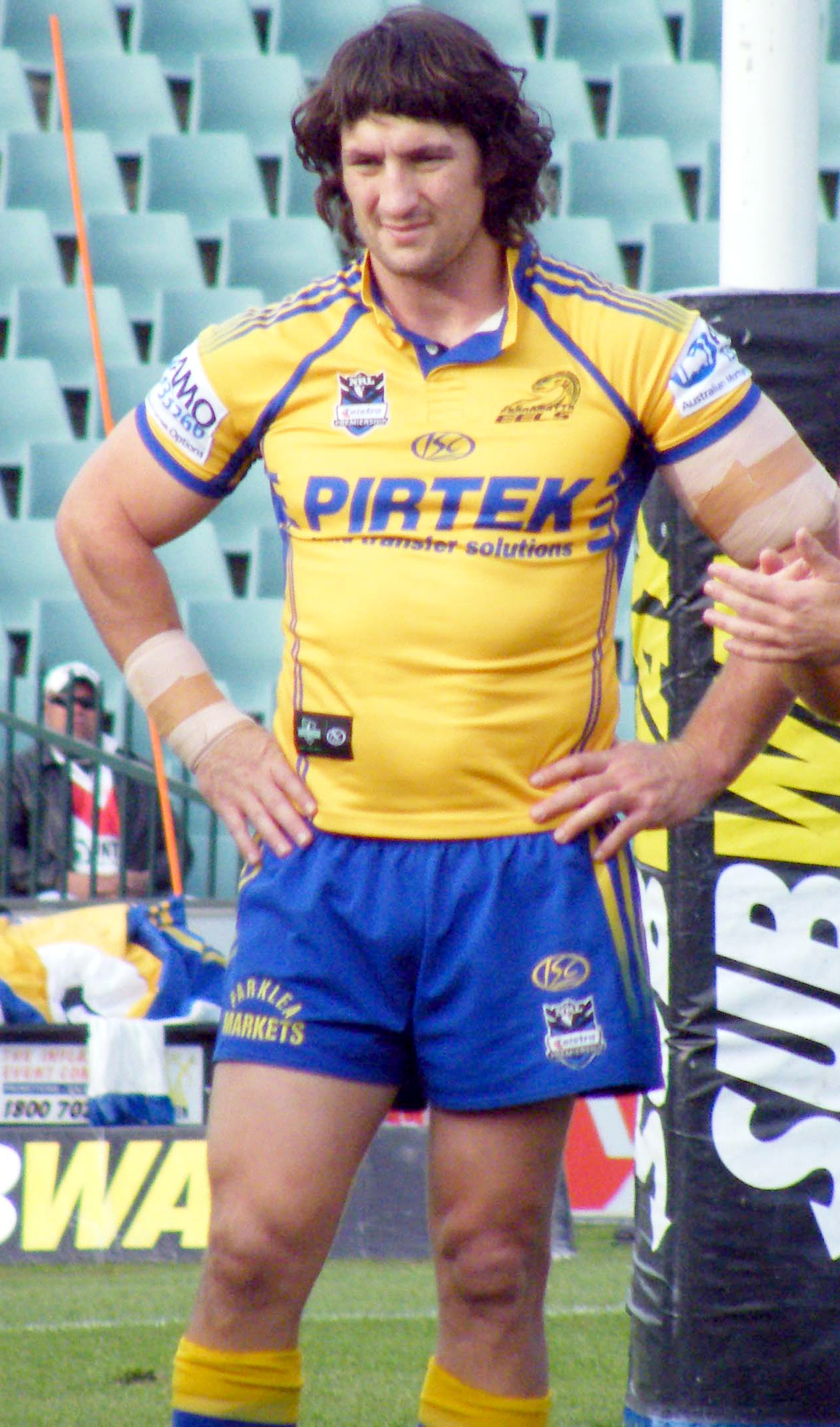

Personal information
- Full name: Nathan William Hindmarsh
- Born: 7 September 1979 (age 47) Bowral, New South Wales, Australia

Playing information
- Height: 188 cm (6 ft 2 in)
- Weight: 100 kg (15 st 10 lb)
- Position: Second-row
Club
Years	Team	Pld	T	G	FG	P
1998–12	Parramatta Eels	330	60	1	0	242
Representative
Years	Team	Pld	T	G	FG	P
2000–09	Australia	23	6	0	0	24
2001–10	New South Wales	17	1	0	0	4
2008	NSW Country	1	0	0	0	0
2011–12	NRL All Stars	2	0	0	0	0
2005–11	Prime Minister's XIII	3	1	1	0	6
- Education: Patrician Brothers' College, Fairfield
- Relatives: Ian Hindmarsh (brother); Jim Hindmarsh (uncle)

Nathan William Hindmarsh (born 7 September 1979) is an Australian former professional rugby league footballer who captained the Parramatta Eels in the NRL. A New South Wales State of Origin and Australian international representative second-row forward, he played his entire career at the Eels, in 2010 breaking the record for most games with the club. On 28 August 2018, Hindmarsh was inducted into the Parramatta Eels hall of fame.

== Background ==
Hindmarsh was born in Bowral, New South Wales, Australia. He is of Scottish descent.

== Playing career ==
Hindmarsh played for the junior club, Robertson near Moss Vale as part of Group 6 in the Country Rugby League. He later attended renowned rugby league school Patrician Brothers' College, Fairfield.

Hindmarsh and his brother Ian Hindmarsh both played in the National Rugby League for Sydney's Parramatta Eels club. In 1998 Hindmarsh received the club's rookie of the year award. The same season, Hindmarsh was part of the Parramatta side which made it to the preliminary final against Canterbury. With less than 10 minutes to go, Parramatta were winning the match 18-2 but ended up losing 32–20 in extra time.

The following two seasons Hindmarsh suffered similar heartbreak being part of the Parramatta sides which lost the 1999 preliminary final against Melbourne after being up 16–0 at half time and losing to Brisbane in the 2000 preliminary final. In 2001, Hindmarsh was part of the all conquering Parramatta side which only lost 4 games all season on their way to the Minor Premiership and then the 2001 NRL Grand Final against Newcastle. Going into the game, Parramatta were raging hot favourites but were losing 24–0 at halftime and eventually went down 30–24. On breaking Brett Kenny's record for most appearances, Hindmarsh recalled memories of the 2001 final saying "I was jogging back to the half way line crying after Timana Tahu scored that try to make it 28-6 with 16 minutes to go because I knew we were gone". In 2003, Hindmarsh suffered a knee injury and only managed to make 11 appearances during the season. In 2004, Hindmarsh made 21 appearances for Parramatta but for the second consecutive year the club missed the finals. In 2005, Parramatta finished as minor premiers and Hindmarsh injured his knee in round 26 against Brisbane. Hindmarsh was unable to play in the finals series and Parramatta once again suffered preliminary final heartbreak against North Queensland losing 29–0 in a massive upset. In 2007, Hindmarsh had a strong season as Parramatta made it all the way to the preliminary final against Melbourne but lost the match 26–10.

Hindmarsh was selected to play for the Australian national team at second-row forward in the 2007 ANZAC Test match against New Zealand, scoring a try in the Kangaroos' 30–6 victory. He set a new world record for the most tackles made in a single game: in round 23 of the 2007 NRL season he made 75 tackles against the Melbourne Storm. He is also believed to be the first player to make 10,000 tackles in the NRL.

Hindmarsh was selected in the Australian team to go and compete in the end of season 2004 Rugby League Tri-Nations tournament. In the final against Great Britain he played at second-row forward in the Kangaroos' 44–4 victory.

At his peak (2004–2006) Hindmarsh was considered the best second-rower in the NRL by the Dally M judges. He was an automatic pick for NSW and Australia from 2004 to 2007 and was often picked alongside Craig Fitzgibbon.

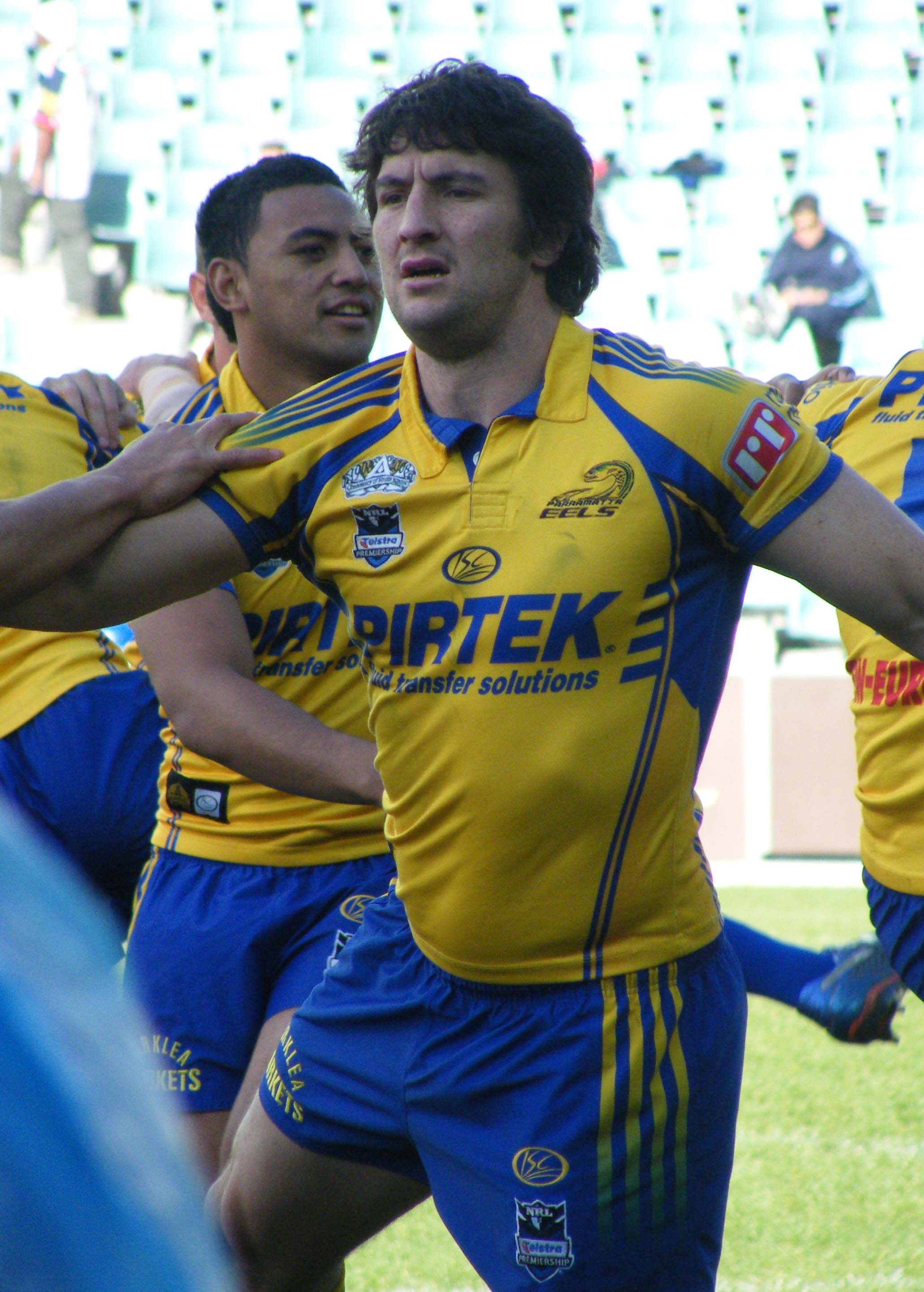
Hindmarsh playing for Parramatta in 2008

After a courageous performance in the 2009 NRL Grand Final, Nathan Hindmarsh earned a well-deserved Test recall after two years of being overlooked for representative honours. In 2010 when it was revealed that Melbourne had been found guilty of rorting the salary cap, there was a possibility that Parramatta could be given the 2009 premiership or that the 2009 season could be left vacant. Hindmarsh said to the media "Who is going to give us that feeling of winning when we are up by six when the siren goes?, who is going to give us that feeling of pride, relief or satisfaction?, or give Nathan Cayless that grand final lap with his kids?, all that feeling is long gone meaning the best we can hope for is a weird little asterisk next to our name in the record books, which is why I don't care about the salary cap scandal, I don't think about it and Melbourne can keep their premiership trophy for all I care, we are just focused on the game coming up this weekend". He was appointed co-captain of the Parramatta Eels in 2010, with Nathan Cayless before becoming the sole captain after Cayless retired.

Making his third appearance for the Prime Minister's XIII in 2011, Hindmarsh became the only player to captain the side twice.

On 29 March 2012, Hindmarsh announced his retirement from rugby league effective at the end of the 2012 season. Despite Hindmarsh's absence from the Parramatta club, he promised he would continue to be a part of the NRL (National Rugby League) community.

On 2 September 2012, Hindmarsh played his final NRL game alongside retiring winger Luke Burt against the St. George Illawarra Dragons. The Eels went down to St. George 29–8 with Hindmarsh successful in scoring a penalty kick on full-time. The game was originally scheduled to be played at Parramatta Stadium but was later moved to Stadium Australia due to the expected crowd. The crowd was the largest for an NRL (non-finals) game.

== Honours ==
=== Individual ===
- 5x Dally M Second Rower of Year: 2000, 2001, 2004, 2005, 2006
- Dally M Medal Best and Fairest Player Runner Up: 2006
- 5x Provan-Summons Medal: (fan's choice for Player of the Year) 2005, 2006, 2007, 2008, 2011
- 8x Parrmatta Player of the Year: 2000, 2001, 2002, 2004, 2006, 2007, 2008, 2012
- RLW Player of the Year: 2004, 2005
- Michael Cronin Club Person of the Year: 2009
- Jack Gibson NRL Coaches' Award: 2012
- Ken Stephen Medal: 2009
- International Forward of the Year: 2004
- Parramatta Eels Rookie of the Year: 1998

=== Parramatta Eels ===
- 2009 NRL Grand Final Runner-up
- NRL Minor Premiers: 2001, 2005
- Eels Hall of Fame: 2018

=== New South Wales ===
- State of Origin Series Wins: 2004, 2005

=== Australia ===
- Rugby League Tri-Nations: 2004, 2006
- Rugby League World Cup: 2000
- Rugby League Four Nations: 2009

== Statistics ==
- NRL Career: 330 1998–2012
- Parramatta Career: 330 games (Most First Grade games played for Parramatta) 1998–2012
- First Grade Debut: Parramatta v Adelaide Rams at Parkes, 16 May 1998 (Round 10)
- Average Tackle Count – 49.91 (2011)
- 60 Tries
- 242 Points
- First player in NRL history to make over 10,000 tackles
- First player in NRL history to make over 11,000 tackles
- First player in NRL history to make over 12,000 tackles
- Third player in NRL history and first Parramatta player to pass 30,000 running, attacking metres

== Personal life ==
Hindmarsh and his wife Bonnie Scott have four children. He is a keen indoor cricketer. Since 2013, Hindmarsh has been employed at Fox Sports where he features on a number of shows, most notably The Matty Johns show, where he does comedy skits with former professional rugby league footballer Bryan Fletcher called Fletch and Hindy. Some skits involve Hindmarsh making fun of himself for the fact that he is the only member on the panel who did not win a premiership, with one of the more recent skits being in relation to the Parramatta Eels loss in the 2022 NRL Grand Final
