= The Footy Show (rugby league) =

1994–2018 Australian sports TV series

- Genre: Sports / Variety
- Presented by: Paul Vautin (1994–2017); Erin Molan (2018)
- Starring: Brad Fittler; Darryl Brohman; Beau Ryan
- Country of origin: Australia
- Original language: English
- No. of seasons: 25
- No. of episodes: 721

Production
- Executive producers: Gary Basini; Glenn Pallister
- Production location: TCN-9 Willoughby, New South Wales
- Running time: 120 minutes approx. (inc. adverts)

Original release
- Network: Nine Network
- Release: 1 September 1994 – 27 September 2018

Related
- The Sunday Footy Show; The Sunday Roast

The Footy Show is an Australian sports variety television program covering professional rugby league in Australia. It was shown on the Nine Network and aired for 25 seasons. For the final season in 2018, the show was hosted by journalist Erin Molan, and co-hosted by Ryan Girdler and Brad Fittler, with regular contributions from Beau Ryan and Darryl Brohman. It was previously hosted by former rugby league footballer and commentator Paul Vautin for 23 years, with former player and commentator Peter Sterling also an early host from the first 12 years. Having aired usually on Thursday nights since 1994, the program was largely entertainment-based, with some football-related content included, such as previews of the weekend's fixtures and interviews with players.

The name The Footy Show derives from the diminutive form of the word football commonly used in Australian English.

On 2 October 2018, it was announced that the show had been axed and would not continue in 2019.

== Presenters ==
- Paul Vautin (1994–2017, Main Host)
- Erin Molan (regular appearance 2012–2013, co-host 2014–2017, main host 2018)
- Beau Ryan (regular appearance 2009–2014, co-host 2014–2018)
- Darryl Brohman (co-host 2010–2017, 'Small Talk' segment 2018) (appeared as a regular guest 2001−2004)
- Ryan Girdler (co-host 2018)
- Brad Fittler (co-host 2011, 2018)
- Bryan Fletcher (Sportsbet Updates, 2012−2013) (appeared as a regular guest 2003−2011)
- Joel Caine (Sportsbet Updates, 2014–2018)
- David Middleton (2013–2017, stats man)
- Michael Slater (2012–2014, co-host)
- Wendell Sailor (2009–2010)
- Laurie Daley (2008) (co-host)
- Matthew Johns (2003–2009) (co-host and played various comedic characters)
- Paul Harragon (2001–2008) (appeared as special guest host on 23 May 2013, 17 June 2014, and again on 23 June 2016)
- Andrew Voss (1997–2011) (appeared as a regular guest 1997–2008 and in 2011, and as a co-host 2009 – 2010)
- Peter Sterling (1994–2006, 2010, major co-host)
- Steve Roach (1994–1999, co-host)
- Ray Hadley (1994–1996, 1998) (occasionally appears for 5-in-the-bin, as of 2012)
- Mario Fenech (1994–2013)
- Allan Robinson (Robbo P.I. – Pest Incorporated)

== Regular guests ==
- Phil Gould (1995−2008)
- Terry Hill (1996−2000)
- Paul Langmack (1997−2001)
- Mark Geyer (2000−2007)
- Wayne Pearce (2000−2001)
- Nathan Brown (2001)
- Jason Stevens (2002−2006)
- Billy Slater (2010–2018)
- James Maloney (2012–2018)
- Paul Gallen (2013–2018)
- Sam Thaiday (2013–2018)
- Tommy Raudonikis (2016–2017, regular panelist)
- Brett Finch (2013–2016, regular panelist)
- Yvonne Sampson (2013–2016, regular panelist)
- Gorden Tallis (2012–2015, regular panelist)
- Anthony Minichiello (2015, hosted the 'Mini-fit' segment)
- Bryan Fletcher (Sportsbet Updates, 2013)
- Sam Burgess (2011–2014, regular panelist)

== Entertainment ==
- Carl Barron
- Tahir Bilgiç
- Phil Cass
- Anh Do
- Steve Irwin
- Peter Powers
- Vince Sorrenti
- Stevie Starr

== Scheduling ==
The NRL version of the show aired every Thursday.

NSW & QLD

- Thursday Night: approx. 9.40pm on Nine (after the Thursday Night Football)
- Sunday Morning: 11am on Nine

VIC, TAS, SA, & WA

- Thursday Night: 11.30pm on Nine
- Sunday Morning: VIC – 1pm, SA – 12.30pm, WA – 11am on 9Gem (Leading in Nine's Sunday Football)

From 1994 to 2012, The Footy Show usually aired at 9.30 pm AEST, However, on 28 November 2012, Nine announced that the show would air at 8.30 pm AEST.

=== Thursdays ===
In New South Wales, Queensland, Northern Territory and Australian Capital Territory, the NRL version of The Footy Show aired on Thursday evenings, and the AFL version would air later that night. In the AFL dominated states of Victoria, South Australia, Western Australia and Tasmania, the air time is reversed.

The Thursday night NRL version was based around variety with segments, bands and a serious discussion about current issues in the game and past/future match-ups.

Former segments included Anti-Ads, National Naan News (with Mahatma Cote), Daredevil Dudes, Hill Report (with Terry Hill), Yesterday's Hero (with Paul Langmack), Going.. Going.. Gooone, "Crack-a-Fat", One Versus One, No Talent Time, Their House (with Ryan Girdler later with Bryan Fletcher), Reg Reagan and That's Gold. Crack-a Fat returned as a segment in 2013, while That's Gold returned in 2014.

Perhaps the most popular segment introduced on The Footy Show in 2010 is "Stuff You May Have Missed", a weekly wrap-up of bloopers that viewers may have missed during the previous NRL round plus many bloopers from various television programs, not just on Channel Nine but other stations. The segment was dropped in 2013.

2015 segments on the show included "Kick or Grab", "The Footy Show Row Show", "The Molan Files", "Beau Knows", "That's Gold", "Perfect Partners", "Stuff You May Have Missed", and "Player Probe".

Due to Thursday night football being featured on the Nine Network for the 2016 NRL season, The Footy Show moved to Wednesdays at 8.30pm from March 2016. However, from 25 August 2016, the show moved back into its former Thursday night timeslot.

The show's 500th episode aired on 11 August 2011.

=== Sundays ===
The Sunday Footy Show is hosted by Erin Molan, Peter Sterling and Brad Fittler, along with regular panellist Sam Thaiday.

In all AFL dominated states, The Sunday Footy Show is shown on delay at 1pm on 9GEM which is immediately followed at 3pm by Nine's broadcast of Sunday afternoon football (the telecast into SA was controversially canceled in early 2014 but returned in late 2015). Before 2013, The Sunday Footy Show was not broadcast into the AFL dominated states.

== History ==
=== 1990s ===
The Footy Show debuted during the NSWRL finals series of 1994. The original hosts (in 1994) were 'Fatty' aka Paul Vautin, 'Sterlo' (Peter Sterling), and 'Blocker' (Steve Roach), with regular appearances by Ray Hadley. Contrary to what was seen on air, Hadley and Roach did not have a good relationship with the rest of the team, Hadley and Roach left at the end of the 1998 season and 1999 season respectively for varying reasons. Hadley had become disillusioned as a result of the confirmation that the Super League competition would take place in Australia in 1997 (see Super League War). This meant that the Footy Show would be required to give fair coverage and discussion of both the Super League and ARL competitions during its broadcast. Hadley had been a stout supporter of the more traditional ARL, believing that Super League's agenda was backed by money and greed and was not prepared to lend his support to the rival competition, thus leading to his eventual departure from the show. Hadley left at the end of 1996, and returned to the show in 1998, before leaving for good at the end of the 1998 season. Roach, on the other hand, had been involved in an altercation, allegedly assaulting a heckler in a Sydney pub. Channel Nine, not wanting to condone such conduct and wishing to preserve its reputation, were quick to terminate Roach's contract as a result of his actions.

For two years, Vautin and Sterling presented the show by themselves, often with guest hosts such as Darryl Brohman, Paul Langmack, Wayne Pearce, Phil Gould, the Johns brothers (Andrew and Matthew), Ryan Girdler with his highly popular segment, Their House, the name a parody of the Australian TV program Our House (a lifestyle programme).

=== 2000s ===
In 2001, a contest was held to find a new co-host, via a parody of the hit show Survivor (also shown on Nine), and popular Newcastle premiership winning captain Paul Harragon, also known as 'Chief', was selected. In 2003, fellow former Knights player Matthew Johns joined as the fourth host, following the success of his appearances as alter egos Reg Reagan and Trent The Flight Steward the previous year. A new character, Randy Discotelli, based upon an American fitness instructor, was introduced in 2005.

Paul Harragon's introduction to the show brought popular segments such as 'That's Tops', which involves giving the 'thumbs up' sign with both hands simultaneously. 'That's Tops' ran from 2002 until the end of 2004. Mario Fenech, aka The Falcon, also appears often as a host. In 2005 'That's Gold' was introduced, a hand gesture which involves placing an upright clenched fist on an open palm; both gestures have become popular throughout Australia and New Zealand and are often 'performed' at NRL-related sports venues across the country (the That's Gold segment was re-introduced to the show in 2014).

In May 2005, due to declining ratings, former host Ray Hadley was invited back to the show. However, he declined this offer due to his radio commitments on 2GB. Rebecca Wilson was also invited to be part of the show and she accepted. However, Vautin and Sterling disapproved of this move for personal reasons, and Wilson appeared for only one episode.

The show has spawned three "best of" video/DVDs, a compilation CD, the Reg Reagan All of Me DVD and the single "Am I Ever Gonna See the Biff Again?" by Reg Reagan and the Knucklemen (Reagan is a parody of a stereotypical ocker football players from the 1970s).

For a period of ten weeks from June 2005, the show was hosted by Matthew Johns, due to head injuries suffered by Vautin while filming a comedy sketch for the show. Vautin returned in September 2005. Clive James also guest presented a show during this period.

The Footy Show is more a variety show than a typical sports program. This is evident through the many games that the members play such as Going, Going, GOOONE! and segments such as Daredevil Dudes. It was on one Daredevil Dudes segment where Vautin suffered his head injury when he fell and hit his head on a concrete gutter. Only one match is previewed in significant depth, it generally being the Friday Night showcase.

In 2007, Peter Sterling decided not to return to the show so he could concentrate on commentating. The show decided to keep the three hosts (Vautin, Harragon and Johns). In 2008, Laurie Daley joined the show as a fourth host.

In early 2009, it was announced that Paul Harragon had quit the show, Laurie Daley had returned to Foxtel (where he first began his television career) and Andrew Voss would join to replace the departing hosts. In May 2009, Matthew Johns was sacked by the network in controversial circumstances.

=== 2010s ===
In 2010, the show underwent a format change. Andrew Voss was removed as host (but still remained on the show as a supporting presenter), and Paul Vautin was joined by three other hosts: Peter Sterling (who returned as a co-host after a three-year absence), Wendell Sailor and Darryl Brohman, who alternated their appearances weekly. In 2011, Wendell Sailor and Peter Sterling left as hosts and the show returned to having three weekly hosts with Vautin, Brohman and Brad Fittler. 2012 has seen Fittler leave the show, and former test cricketer Michael Slater become co-host along with Vautin; Brohman was dropped off as co-host and replaced Andrew Voss as a supporting presenter (most notably presenting the segment "Stuff You May Have Missed"). He returned to being a co-host in 2013.

Michael Slater's place on the show had been questioned by fans who continued to ask why a former cricketer is the host of a rugby league oriented television show. Andrew Voss was replaced on the show after 2011 when he was sacked by Nine after comments he made about the statue of the stations lead rugby league commentator Ray "Rabs" Warren in Warren's home town of Junee.

=== 2018 Revamp and Axing ===
It was announced on 13 October 2017 that the show was set for a refresh in the 2018 season. The format, look and casting of the show was rumored to be changed as Channel Nine entered a new broadcasting deal to show 23 Thursday night NRL games in 2018.

On 17 October 2017, reports emerged from various news sources that host Paul Vautin had been axed from the show, whilst other reports stated that the show had been axed altogether, despite being announced as returning at the Nine Network 2018 Upfronts event. It was reported that a new 1-hour show was to be hosted by Erin Molan after the Thursday night NRL fixture, and would be more news-focused rather than a variety format as the show had been classified as in recent years.

On 15 January 2018, it was confirmed by the Nine Network that Erin Molan would host a new-look version of The Footy Show, to be broadcast after Nine's regular Thursday night NRL fixtures. Molan was joined by members of the Wide World of Sports commentary team as well as former and current NRL players. Whilst previously announcing his departure from the show, Darryl Brohman along with Beau Ryan confirmed they would remain part of the show in 2018 to continue hosting their regular segments. Paul Vautin's duties were restricted to commentary roles on the network, signalling an end to his 24-year hosting tenure of the show.

On 15 February 2018, it was announced that Ryan Girdler would become a full-time panellist in 2018, alongside Wide World of Sports commentator Andrew Johns.

James Bracey assumed main hosting duties of the show from 17 May 2018, as Erin Molan departed for maternity leave. She returned to hosting during the 2018 season's final weeks.

An emotional Paul Vautin made a guest appearance on 24 May 2018 as the show was broadcast live from Suncorp Stadium in Brisbane. He expressed gratitude and thanked his former colleagues, his family and viewers for supporting his 23-year long tenure as the show's main host, after he was relieved of his duties in October 2017.

On 2 October 2018, Channel Nine announced that the show had been axed and would not return to air in 2019. It was replaced by a new Thursday night post-match show called Golden Point, hosted by James Bracey with Paul Vautin featuring as a regular panelist.

== Brisbane Footy Show ==
The Brisbane Footy Show was the original concept of an NRL Footy Show devised by the QTQ9 Production Manager John Evans. The show started in 1993 for two years before Channel 9 headquarters in Sydney believed it was a waste of money and resources to have different footy shows airing in different states. The Brisbane Footy Show started as a high-budget "live" show almost solely concerned with League discussion and a music act. The set was large, encompassing the entire of Studio B including a studio audience of more than 100, with a complete green floor (simulating grass) and a large set of goalposts. There were several areas where interviews were conducted, including "controversy corner" and the "bar room" as well as the main panel desk. The show was hosted by Billy J. Smith during its first year, with Chris Bombolas taking over the following year. Also appearing on the show were Gary Belcher, Kevin Walters (doing Street Beat), Peter Jackson, Mario Fenech, Laurel Edwards and Steve Haddin with a weekly live cross from Sam Newman from the Channel 9 Melbourne AFL Footy Show, who would usually make sarcastic comments towards Mario Fenech. Today, the Sydney version is shown across Queensland.

== The Footy Show Fight Night ==
The Footy Show Fight Night is a boxing event, with the inaugural event occurring on 31 January 2015, headlined by Sonny Bill Williams and his bout against Chauncy Welliver.The first Footy Show Fight Night was hosted by Erin Molan and Beau Ryan, with commentary from Ray Hadley and boxers Jeff Fenech, Danny Green and Anthony Mundine.

== Special editions ==
During May 2006, the town of Beaconsfield, Tasmania was rocked by a collapse of its local gold mine, trapping 34-year-old Todd Russell and 37-year-old Brant Webb and killing Larry Knight. Miraculously, Russell and Webb escaped with aid from emergency workers. To celebrate, both the AFL and the NRL Footy Shows had a special program dedicated to the two survivors. This included a cross to Eddie McGuire who held an interview with Brant and Todd.

In 2006, to celebrate the State of Origin decider—which was to be held in Melbourne for the first time in years—the two shows were filmed in adjoining rooms, in Nine Network Melbourne's complex. On the AFL Show, Fatty went over from the NRL Show to join as a guest for a few minutes. Upon his return, a quiz was held between AFL Show regulars Billy Brownless and Sam Newman, with Matthew Johns and Peter Sterling representing the NRL side. Most of the questions were about either the Melbourne Storm for the NRL boys, since it was a celebration of Melbourne Rugby League, and the Geelong Football Club who Newman and Brownless both played for in the AFL. The AFL boys won the quiz. Also during the show, Newman showed the two boys what he thought of their 2006 Logie by destroying a (presumably) fake Logie while Fatty was on their show.

In 2006, the AFL and NRL produced a special broadcast from Germany. This was to coincide with the Socceroos FIFA World Cup campaign. It was co-hosted by Eddie McGuire and James Brayshaw. Unlike the traditional versions, the special was solely based around the Socceroos' World Cup Campaign.

In July 2014, The Footy Show was broadcast from the Newcastle Entertainment Centre in the lead up to the "Rise for Alex" round in support of 22-year-old Newcastle Knights player Alex McKinnon who had suffered a career ending neck injury earlier in the season which has (currently) confined him to a wheelchair. As the show was in Newcastle, guests included former Footy Show presenter and current Knights CEO Paul Harragon, as well as other Knights legends Andrew Johns and Danny Buderus. Newcastle coach Wayne Bennett also appeared for the first time on the show. The show featured interviews Erin Molan had conducted with both McKinnon and Bennett.

== Awards ==
The Logie Award for Most Popular Sports Program has been going on since 1996 (except 1999 where the award was not given out). The show has won or been nominated every year since this award has been out.

Logies won:

- 11 times (2000, 2005–2007, 2009–2010, 2013–2017)

Logies nominated:

- 10 times (1996–1998, 2001–2004, 2008, 2011–2012); lost to The AFL Footy Show (1996–1998, 2002–2003, 2008, 2011); The Dream with Roy and HG (2001); The AFL Grand Final (2012)

It has also been nominated for:

- Once (1996) for the Most Popular Light Entertainment award (lost to Hey Hey It's Saturday)

== Criticism and controversy ==
The Footy Show has attracted criticism for its often crass, low-brow humour, and been accused of "celebrating" alcohol in sport. The program once featured alcohol advertisements throughout, and alcohol advertising on the set.

Mario Fenech, who was often the butt of jokes on the show and later in life suffered cognitive decline due to injuries sustained during his rugby career, admitted that he often resented the way he was treated during his time on the programme.

== International broadcast ==
The program was shown live in New Zealand on Sky Sport.

Due to the time difference the show was shown on tape delay in the United Kingdom on Premier Sports and in the Republic of Ireland on Setanta Sports. It was normally airs at 10pm on Thursday night, although Premier and Setanta will sometimes show the program earlier in the day in an early evening slot, as well as the 10pm showing.

Also aired in Papua New Guinea on EM TV at the same time as The Queensland telecast.

== See also ==
- List of Australian television series
- List of longest-running Australian television series
