= 2001 State of Origin series =

Australian rugby league series

- Won by: Queensland (10th title)
- Series margin: 2-1
- Points scored: 138
- Attendance: 158,599 (ave. 52,866 per match)
- Top points scorer(s): Darren Lockyer (34)
- Top try scorer(s): Chris Walker (4)

The 2001 State of Origin series was the 20th year that the annual three-game series between the Queensland and New South Wales representative rugby league football teams was contested entirely under 'state of origin' selection rules. The series was notable for marking the first time an England-based player was selected for State of Origin: Maroons legend Allan Langer was asked to make his comeback for the third and deciding match of the series and did so, helping Queensland re-claim the shield in Brisbane.

== Game I ==
Queensland coach Wayne Bennett made it a personal mission to regain the great loss of credibility suffered from the 2000 series whitewash and 40 point last game defeat and decided he wanted his old Maroon coaching job back after a two-year sojourn.

Sunday, May 6, 2001

Queensland	34–16	New South Wales
Darren Lockyer (14 - 1t,5g); Darren Smith (4 - 1t); John Buttigieg (4 - 1t); John Doyle (4 - 1t); Carl Webb (4 - 1t); Chis Walker (4 - 1t)	(Report)	(4 - 2g) Michael De Vere (4 - 1t) Matthew Gidley (4 - 1t) Brad Fittler (4 - 1t) Trent Barrett

Suncorp Stadium, Brisbane
Attendance: 38,909
Referee: Bill Harrigan
Player of the Match: Gorden Tallis

In game I Queensland blooded no less than ten new players and Wayne Bennett gambled on the likes of Brisbane Broncos forward Carl Webb and North Queensland Cowboys John Buttigieg and John Doyle who were relative unknowns. But they each announced their representative arrival in dramatic style with a try each in the first game, won 34-16 by the Maroons in the last match played at the "old" Suncorp Stadium. The most spectacular was Webb's two minutes before half-time when he brushed off three defenders before powering his way across the line.

== Game II ==
Queensland went into game 2 without captain Gorden Tallis who was out with a neck injury.

Sunday, June 10, 2001

New South Wales	26–8	Queensland
Brad Fittler (8 - 2t); Ryan Girdler (6 - 3g); Jamie Ainscough (4 - 1t); Trent Barrett (4 - 1t); Luke Ricketson (4 - 1t)	(Report)	(4 - 2g) Darren Lockyer (4 - 1t) Chris Walker

Telstra Stadium, Sydney
Attendance: 70,249
Referee: Bill Harrigan
Player of the Match: Trent Barrett

Played before 70,000 at Telstra Stadium, Blues skipper Brad Fittler scored two tries in what was to be his last match for NSW on home soil and inspired his side to a 26-8 victory. Man of the match was Trent Barrett playing halfback for the first time due to injuries to Brett Kimmorley and Andrew Johns. Debutante Mark O'Meley was particularly impressive, setting up Fittler's first try after 53 minutes with a smashing run that sent defenders skittling.

== Game III ==
The lead up to Game III was dominated by emotion regarding Brad Fittler's pending retirement from representative football after 29 Origin appearances. But with the series tied at one game apiece Queensland needed some special emotion of their own to avoid a loss. Without inspirational captain Tallis and an established halves pairing, coach Bennett undertook furtive negotiations with Maroon's veteran Allan Langer, then in his second English season and captain of the Warrington Wolves, and the rumours were only confirmed after Langer had boarded a plane (under a false name) for the flight home, bound for his 31st career Origin appearance. At almost 35 years of age, Langer was named in his famous No.7 jersey for the first time since leaving Australia part-way through the 1999 NRL season.

Sunday, 1 July 2001

Queensland	40–14	New South Wales
Darren Lockyer (16 - 2t,4g); Chris Walker (8 - 2t); Paul Bowman (8 - 2t); Allan Langer (4 - 1t); Dane Carlaw (4 - 1t)	(Report)	(14 - 2t,3g) Ryan Girdler

ANZ Stadium, Brisbane
Attendance: 49,441
Referee: Bill Harrigan
Player of the Match: Darren Lockyer

Despite NSW centre Ryan Girdler scoring the fastest try in Origin history after 39 seconds, Queensland took a 28-8 lead into the break with Langer heavily involved in three of the Maroons' first half tries. Alongside Darren Lockyer who created his own form of havoc, Langer tore New South Wales to shreds and capped his comeback in the 54th minute when he scored a trademark solo try from close range to sentence the Blues to a series-deciding loss and Fittler to his own bittersweet representative farewell (although he would make a comeback three years later and help his state to a victory in his final year before retirement).

Sydney's The Daily Telegraph reacted to the New South Wales team's Origin loss with this headline on the front of its paper on July 2, 2001: "BLOODY ALF".

== New South Wales squad ==
Position	Game 1	Game 2	Game 3
Fullback	Mark Hughes		
Wing	Jamie Ainscough		
Centre	Michael De Vere	Ryan Girdler	
Centre	Matt Gidley		
Wing	Adam MacDougall		
Five-Eighth	Brad Fittler (c)		
Halfback	Brett Kimmorley	Trent Barrett	Brett Kimmorley
Prop	Jason Stevens		
Hooker	Luke Priddis		
Prop	Robbie Kearns	Mark O'Meley	
Second Row	Bryan Fletcher		
Second Row	Nathan Hindmarsh	Adam Muir	
Lock	Jason Croker	Luke Ricketson	Andrew Ryan
Interchange	Trent Barrett	Craig Gower	
Interchange	Michael Vella		
Interchange	Ben Kennedy	Matt Adamson	
Interchange	Rodney Howe	Andrew Ryan	Steve Menzies
Coach	Wayne Pearce		

== Queensland squad ==
Position	Game 1	Game 2	Game 3
Fullback	Darren Lockyer	Darren Lockyer (c)	
Wing	Lote Tuqiri		
Centre	Darren Smith		Chris Walker
Centre	Paul Bowman		
Wing	Wendell Sailor		
Five-Eighth	Daniel Wagon		
Halfback	Paul Green		Allan Langer
Prop	Shane Webcke		
Hooker	Kevin Campion		Paul Green
Prop	John Buttigieg	Russell Bawden	John Buttigieg
Second Row	Gorden Tallis (c)	Dane Carlaw	Brad Meyers
Second Row	Petero Civoniceva		
Lock	Brad Meyers		Darren Smith
Interchange	Chris Walker		Kevin Campion
Interchange	Chris Beattie		Carl Webb
Interchange	Carl Webb		Dane Carlaw
Interchange	John Doyle	Nathan Fien	John Doyle
Coach	Wayne Bennett		

== See also ==
- 2001 NRL season

== Sources ==
- Big League's 25 Years of Origin Collectors' Edition, News Magazines, Surry Hills, Sydney
