= 2000 State of Origin series =

Australian rugby league series

- Won by: New South Wales (9th title)
- Series margin: 3-0
- Points scored: 146
- Attendance: 159,074 (ave. 53,025 per match)
- Top points scorer(s): Ryan Girdler (52)
- Top try scorer(s): Ryan Girdler (5)

The 2000 State of Origin series was the 19th year that the annual three-game series between the Queensland and New South Wales representative rugby league football teams was played entirely under 'state of origin' selection rules. During the 2000 series Gorden Tallis was sent off for calling the referee a cheat, Ryan Girdler amassed an incredible 32 points in one match and New South Wales whitewashed the series in a combined scoreline of 104 to 42 - the biggest gap between the two sides in history.

== Game I ==
Wednesday, 10 May
20:00 AEST (UTC+10)

New South Wales	20 – 16	Queensland
Tries: 4 MacDougall 23', 48'; Girdler 71'; Peachey 77'; Goals: 2 Girdler pen 10', 49' (2/5)	1st: 6–8; 2nd: 14–8; Report	Tries: 3 Lam 32', 44'; Rogers 16'; Goals: 2 Rogers 45' (1/3); Lockyer pen 60' (1/1); Field goals: 0 Lam (0/1); Sent off: Tallis (red card) 71'

Stadium Australia, Sydney
Attendance: 61,511
Referee: Bill Harrigan
Video referee: Chris Ward
Touch judges: Phil Cooley, Steve Nash
Player of the Match: Adam MacDougall (New South Wales)

After Ryan Girdler had scored a try to level at 16-all which appeared to have included two knock-ons in the lead up, a furious Gorden Tallis confronted Bill Harrigan and was immediately dismissed after calling him a cheat. Six minutes later the Blues took advantage of the extra man for David Peachey to cross out wide and secure a 20-16 win.

Immediately after the game Tallis was summonsed to a judiciary hearing at the ground but was not suspended. He had been to the referee's room beforehand and apologised to Harrigan. Blues prop Robbie Kearns later claimed in the Herald Sun that Tallis was to blame for Queensland's loss by showing poor discipline and that he had let himself and his side down. Tallis was just the second player to be sent off in Origin history.

== Game II ==
Wednesday, 24 May
20:00 AEST (UTC+10)

Queensland	10 – 28	New South Wales
Tries: 1 Tallis 50'; Goals: 3 Rogers pen 2', pen 33', 51' (3/3)	1st: 4–0; 2nd: 6–28; Report	Tries: 5 Fittler 45'; Timmins 60'; S. Hill 63'; Furner 65'; Girdler 79'; Goals: 4 Girdler 46', 62', 64', 66' (4/5); Johns (0/1)

Suncorp Metway Stadium, Brisbane
Attendance: 38,796
Referee: Bill Harrigan
Video referee: Eddie Ward
Touch judges: Phil Cooley, Alan Caddy
Player of the Match: Tim Brasher (New South Wales)

New South Wales' win in the second game secured their first series win since 1997 and the 28–10 scoreline would be their biggest ever winning margin until Game III two weeks later.

== Game III ==
Wednesday, 7 June
20:00 AEST (UTC+10)

New South Wales	56 – 16	Queensland
Tries: 9 Girdler 16', 26', 52'; Gidley 58', 80'; Muir 19'; Johns 44'; Fletcher 65'; MacDougall 71'; Goals: 10; Girdler (18', 21', 27', pen 37', 45', 54', 60', 67', 72', 80)' (10/10)	1st: 20–10; 2nd: 36–6; Report	Tries: 3 Rogers 23'; Smith 30'; Tallis 77'; Goals: 2 Rogers 24', 78' (2/3)

Stadium Australia, Sydney
Attendance: 58,767
Referee: Bill Harrigan
Video referee: Graeme West
Touch judges: Phil Cooley, Steve Chiddy
Player of the Match: Ryan Girdler (New South Wales)

New South Wales centre Ryan Girdler produced the performance of his life and the Blues were hailed as the greatest side in Origin history after they demolished Queensland and completed their third clean sweep. Girdler scored three tries and kicked ten goals from ten attempts for a record 32-point haul during which New South Wales crossed the Queensland line nine times. New South Wales had led 20–10 at half-time, and a try to Andrew Johns after the break saw the floodgates open with six Origin records beaten or matched:

- Biggest winning margin in State of Origin history (since broken by Queensland in Game III, 2015)
- Most points in an Origin match
- Most points by an individual in an Origin match
- Most points by an individual in an Origin series (Girdler, 52)
- Most goals by an individual in an Origin match
- Most tries by an individual in an Origin match (Girdler's three equalled Chris Anderson's in 1983 and Kerry Boustead's in 1984)

== Teams ==
=== New South Wales ===
Position	Game 1	Game 2	Game 3
Fullback	David Peachey	Tim Brasher	
Wing	Adam MacDougall		
Centre	Ryan Girdler		
Centre	Shaun Timmins		Matt Gidley
Wing	Jamie Ainscough		
Five-Eighth	Brad Fittler (c)		
Halfback	Brett Kimmorley		
Prop	Robbie Kearns		
Hooker	Geoff Toovey		
Prop	Rodney Howe		Jason Stevens
Second Row	Bryan Fletcher		
Second Row	David Furner	Ben Kennedy	
Lock	Ben Kennedy	Scott Hill	
Interchange	Scott Hill	Andrew Johns	
Interchange	Terry Hill	David Furner	
Interchange	Michael Vella	Adam Muir	
Interchange	Jason Stevens		Michael Vella
Coach	Wayne Pearce		

=== Queensland ===
Position	Game 1	Game 2	Game 3
Fullback	Darren Lockyer		
Wing	Mat Rogers		
Centre	Paul Bowman		
Centre	Darren Smith		Matt Sing
Wing	Wendell Sailor	Matt Sing	Wendell Sailor
Five-Eighth	Ben Ikin	Julian O'Neill	Ben Ikin
Halfback	Adrian Lam (c)		
Prop	Shane Webcke		
Hooker	Jason Hetherington		
Prop	Martin Lang		
Second Row	Gorden Tallis		
Second Row	Brad Thorn		Chris McKenna
Lock	Jason Smith		Darren Smith
Interchange	Paul Green		Julian O'Neill
Interchange	Tonie Carroll		Brad Thorn
Interchange	Russell Bawden		Tonie Carroll
Interchange	Steve Price		Craig Greenhill
Coach	Mark Murray		

== Aftermath ==
A major turning point in State of Origin history occurred in this series, when, in the third game, Bryan Fletcher was seen celebrating his try by performing a fake hand grenade aimed towards the Queensland side. The try celebration forced Queensland to change their whole strategy towards Origin and it created a pathway for the Maroons to win fifteen of twenty-one series since 2006 (including a record eight straight between 2006 and 2013). Former Queensland player Wendell Sailor said “As a Queenslander, you never forget that". Queensland Origin great Gorden Tallis had previously spoken about how that try celebration eventually led to a shift in the State of Origin balance of power which saw Queensland win back the Shield in 2001, and retain it in 2002. Former player Matthew Johns claims that the try celebration started a Queensland dynasty. Former Queensland coach Chris Close spoke about Fletcher's try celebration in 2016: "I thought it was disgraceful act and a disgraceful show of disrespect, You would certainly never, ever see that from any Queensland team, It still burns. F---ing oath it does".

== See also ==
- 2000 NRL season

== Sources ==
- Big League's 25 Years of Origin Collectors' Edition, News Magazines, Surry Hills, Sydney
