= Queensland (disambiguation) =

Queensland is an Australian state.

Queensland may also refer to:

- Queensland, Calgary, a neighbourhood in Alberta, Canada
- Queensland, Georgia, an unincorporated town in Georgia, USA
- Queensland, Maryland, a census-designated place in the United States
- Queensland, Nova Scotia, a community in Nova Scotia, Canada
- Queensland (film), a 1976 Australian film
- Mount Queensland, Antarctica
- 45566 Queensland, a British LMS Jubilee Class locomotive
- "That's in Queensland", an Australian rugby league parody song

== See also ==
- Queens Land, a water theme park in Chennai, India
