= Cooper Johns =

Australian rugby league footballer (born 1999)

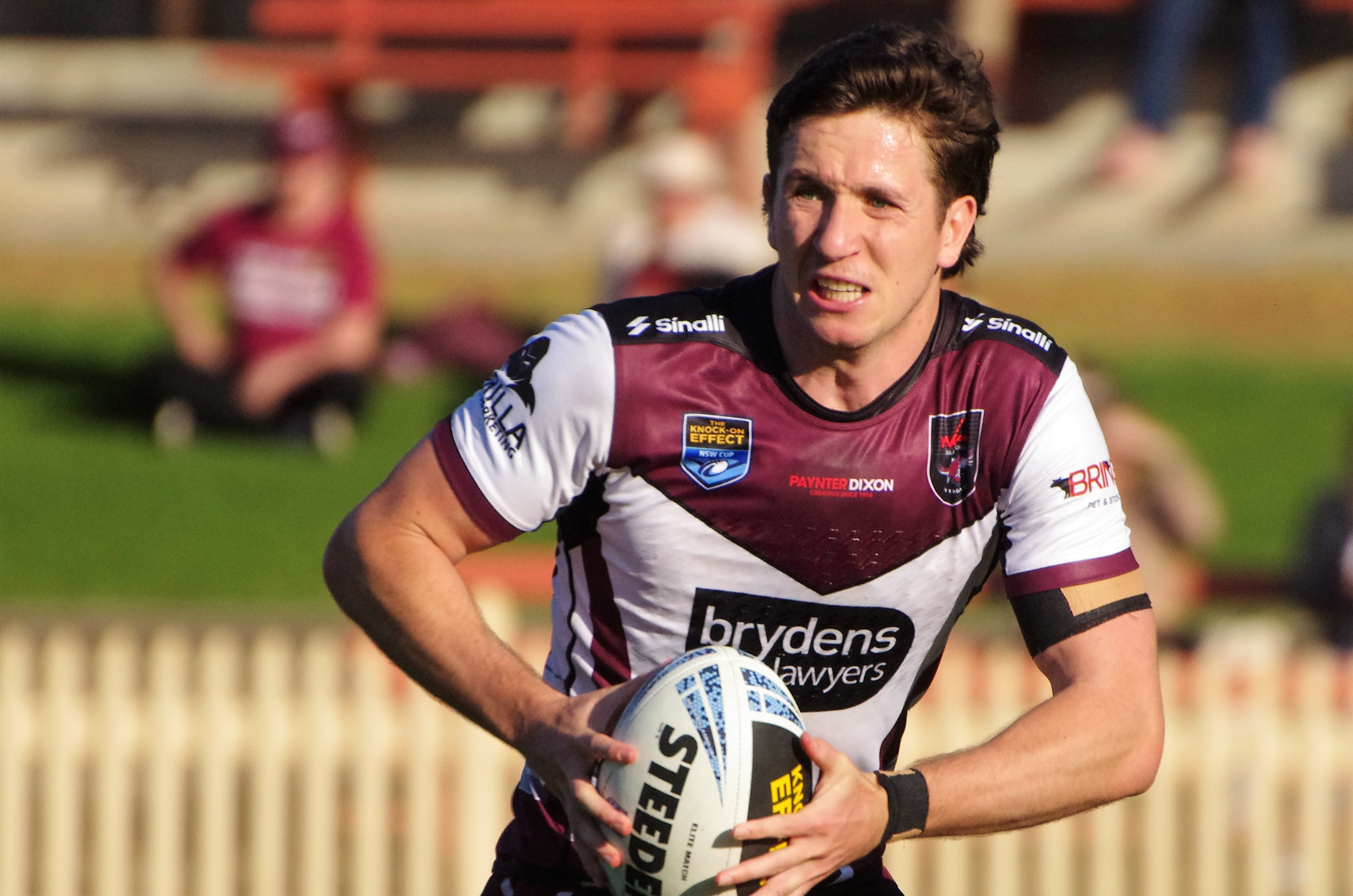

Personal information
- Born: 14 July 1999 (age 27) Newcastle, New South Wales, Australia
- Height: 185 cm (6 ft 1 in)
- Weight: 85 kg (13 st 5 lb)

Playing information
- Position: Five-eighth, Halfback
Club
| Years | Team | Pld | T | G | FG | P |
|---|---|---|---|---|---|---|
| 2020–22 | Melbourne Storm | 11 | 1 | 0 | 0 | 4 |
| 2023 | Manly Sea Eagles | 8 | 0 | 0 | 0 | 0 |
| | Total | 19 | 1 | 0 | 0 | 4 |
- Source: RLP
- Education: St Augustine's College, Sydney
- Father: Matthew Johns
- Relatives: Andrew Johns (uncle); Jack Johns (brother)

Cooper Johns (born 14 July 1999) is an Australian former professional rugby league footballer who played as a five-eighth or halfback for the Melbourne Storm and Manly Warringah Sea Eagles in the National Rugby League (NRL).

== Background ==
Johns is the son of former Newcastle Knights player Matthew Johns, nephew of Andrew Johns and younger brother of Jack Johns.

Cooper was educated at St Augustine's College, Sydney and represented the NSW CIS team. He played his junior rugby league with the Narraweena Hawks before signing with Manly-Warringah Sea Eagles, where he played SG Ball Cup as part of Manly's development squad. He would transfer to Melbourne Storm at the end of 2017, where he was allocated to play with the Sunshine Coast Falcons in the Queensland Cup.

== NRL career ==
=== 2020–2022 (Storm) ===
Johns made his first grade debut in round 15 of the 2020 NRL season for the Melbourne Storm against Parramatta, which ended in a 14–0 loss at Western Sydney Stadium. He had his Melbourne jersey (cap number 204) presented to him by Craig Bellamy with his father Matty Johns and his mother present via zoom.

Despite being released by Melbourne at the end of the 2022 NRL season, he was called up to the Italian national side for the 2021 Rugby League World Cup. Following his initial selection, Johns did not travel to the tournament. On 18 November, Johns signed a contract to join Manly-Warringah starting in 2023.

=== 2023 (Sea Eagles) ===
In January, Johns signed a one-year deal with Manly-Warringah Sea Eagles under a train and trial contract. Johns made eight appearances for Manly in the 2023 NRL season as the club missed the finals.

On 15 January 2024, Johns announced his immediate retirement live on radio.

== Post-NRL career ==
He took up a position at KIIS 106.5 on The Kyle & Jackie O Show.
