= Matthew Johns =

Australian rugby league player (born 1971)

Matthew "Matty" Johns
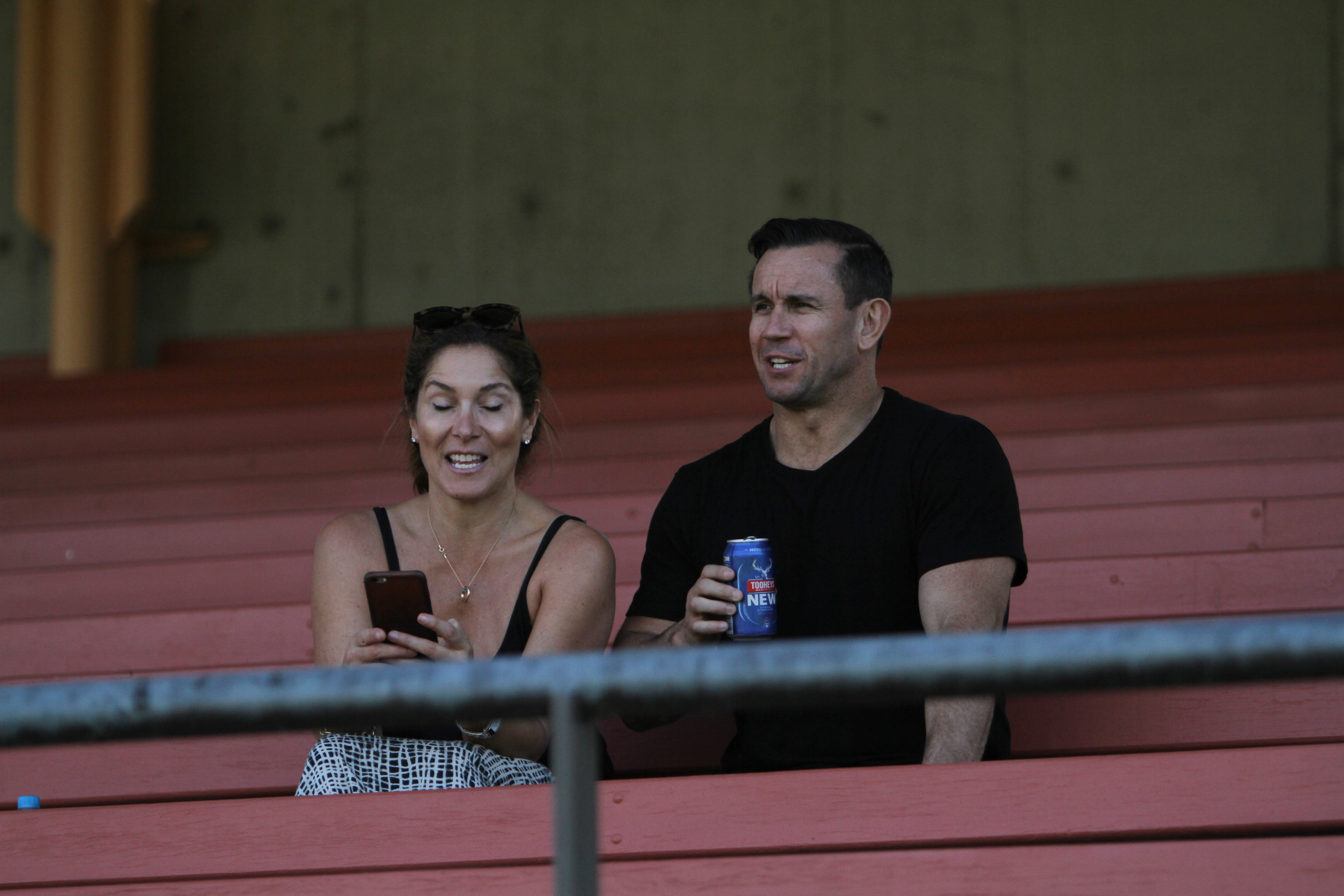
- Johns in 2016

Personal information
- Full name: Matthew James Johns
- Born: 27 July 1971 (age 55) Cessnock, New South Wales, Australia

Playing information
- Height: 175 cm (5 ft 9 in)
- Weight: 89 kg (14 st 0 lb)
- Position: Five-eighth
Club
Years	Team	Pld	T	G	FG	P
1992–00	Newcastle Knights	176	22	0	9	97
2001	Wigan Warriors	25	3	0	1	13
2002	Cronulla Sharks	21	8	0	0	32
	Total	222	33	0	10	142
Representative
Years	Team	Pld	T	G	FG	P
1996	Country NSW	1	0	0	0	0
1995–98	New South Wales	4	0	0	0	0
1995–99	Australia	9	2	0	0	8
- Relatives: Andrew Johns (brother); Jack Johns (son); Cooper Johns (son)

Matthew James Johns is an Australian rugby league media personality, commentator and former professional player. An Australian international and New South Wales State of Origin representative five-eighth, Johns played his club football primarily with the Newcastle Knights, alongside his younger brother, Andrew. Since March 2011, Johns has been a co-host on the Triple M Sydney breakfast show called The Grill Team with Mark Geyer. Since 2012, Johns has been a part of the Fox Sports NRL coverage. He had his own show on Channel 7 for one season in 2010, The Matty Johns Show and since 2013 has hosted a rugby league analysis and light entertainment show on Foxtel airing two nights each week.

== Playing career ==
Johns played as five-eighth for the Knights, playing outside his younger brother Andrew Johns at halfback for nine seasons. Johns was part of the Australian squad that won the 1995 Rugby League World Cup, and went on to play eight matches for his country. He also played four State of Origin series matches for New South Wales for four losses. Another highlight of his career with the Knights was the 1997 Australian Rugby League grand final victory over the Manly-Warringah Sea Eagles.

Johns was selected for the Australian team to compete in the end of season 1999 Rugby League Tri-Nations tournament. In the final against New Zealand he played at five-eighth and scored a try in the Kangaroos' 22–20 victory.

Salary cap problems led to Johns leaving the Newcastle club at the end of 2000 to play a season with the UK based Super League club Wigan. He considered playing for Wales at the 2000 Rugby League World Cup due to his Welsh heritage. Johns played for the Wigan Warriors at five-eighth in their 2001 Super League Grand Final loss to the Bradford Bulls.

Johns returned to the National Rugby League in 2002 to play a season with the Cronulla-Sutherland Sharks, before shoulder and neck injuries forced his retirement at the end of the season.

=== 2002 NZ tour sexual assault investigation ===
While on a pre-season tour of New Zealand in February 2002, Johns and 11 other unnamed members of the Cronulla-Sutherland Sharks were involved in a group sex session with a 19-year-old in Johns' Christchurch hotel room. Following an allegation of sexual assault from the woman five days later, police investigated the incident both in New Zealand and Australia but did not lay any charges.

Seven years later, the ABC TV Four Corners documentary program "Code of Silence", broadcast on 11 May 2009, reported on the incident. Although Four Corners spoke to Johns about the incident, he declined to give an on-camera interview for the program. The alleged victim (known by the pseudonym "Clare") stated that she had returned to room 21 of the Racecourse Hotel with Johns and another player, and that when one of them began to kiss her without her consent, she felt socially awkward objecting to the unwanted advance; which eventually led to sex.

Johns admitted to taking part, but stated that the act was consensual. In May 2009, Johns agreed to be interviewed by the Nine Network to give his viewpoint of the incident, saying it had been painful for his family and regretted what happened. He stated that he had been apprehensive about the consequences of the incident for seven years.

Subsequent to the Four Corners program, Johns was stood down by Channel Nine from his role as rugby league commentator and co-host of The Footy Show. The Melbourne Storm also took the step of releasing Johns indefinitely as an assistant coach.

== Entertainment career ==
=== Film ===
Johns's first foray into entertainment began in 1999 when he adopted the persona of Reg Reagan in a low-budget film, In Search of the Holy Grail, which was made for The Shoot Out 24 Hour Filmmaking Festival in Newcastle. The film also starred fellow Knights players Andrew Johns as Bruno, Matthew Gidley, Trent Watson, Danny Buderus and Robbie O'Davis. The Nine Network showed excerpts of the film on The Footy Show.

The Reg Reagan character was developed further in an article in the Sydney Morning Herald in 2000 where Johns described the character as a late 1970s Australian (or ocker) who smoked only Winfield Reds and drank KB beer. Fans of Johns's new side Cronulla started wearing copies of the T-shirt worn by Reagan, with the slogan "Bring Back the Biff", to games.

Johns appeared in Footy Legends where he appeared as himself. The film was directed by Khoa Do, and released on 3 August 2006. In 2007 The Final Winter presented Johns in his first feature film acting role where he starred as 'Jack', the 1980s coach of the Newtown Jets.

=== Television ===
In 2002, Johns became a regular on The Footy Show with Reagan and a new character, Trent, a gay flight attendant from San Francisco. After his retirement as a player, Johns signed deals with the Nine Network and Sony Music Entertainment. He appeared on The Footy Show and as a commentator on Nine's broadcasts of rugby league matches. He has recorded a DVD titled "All of Me", released in June 2004, featuring skits by Reg Reagan and Trent the flight attendant.

In 2004, as Reg Reagan, Johns recorded a song called "Am I Ever Gonna See the Biff Again?" sung to the tune of The Angels' 1976 hit "Am I Ever Gonna See Your Face Again?". The song is a humorous lamentation of the decline of onfield violence in professional rugby league.

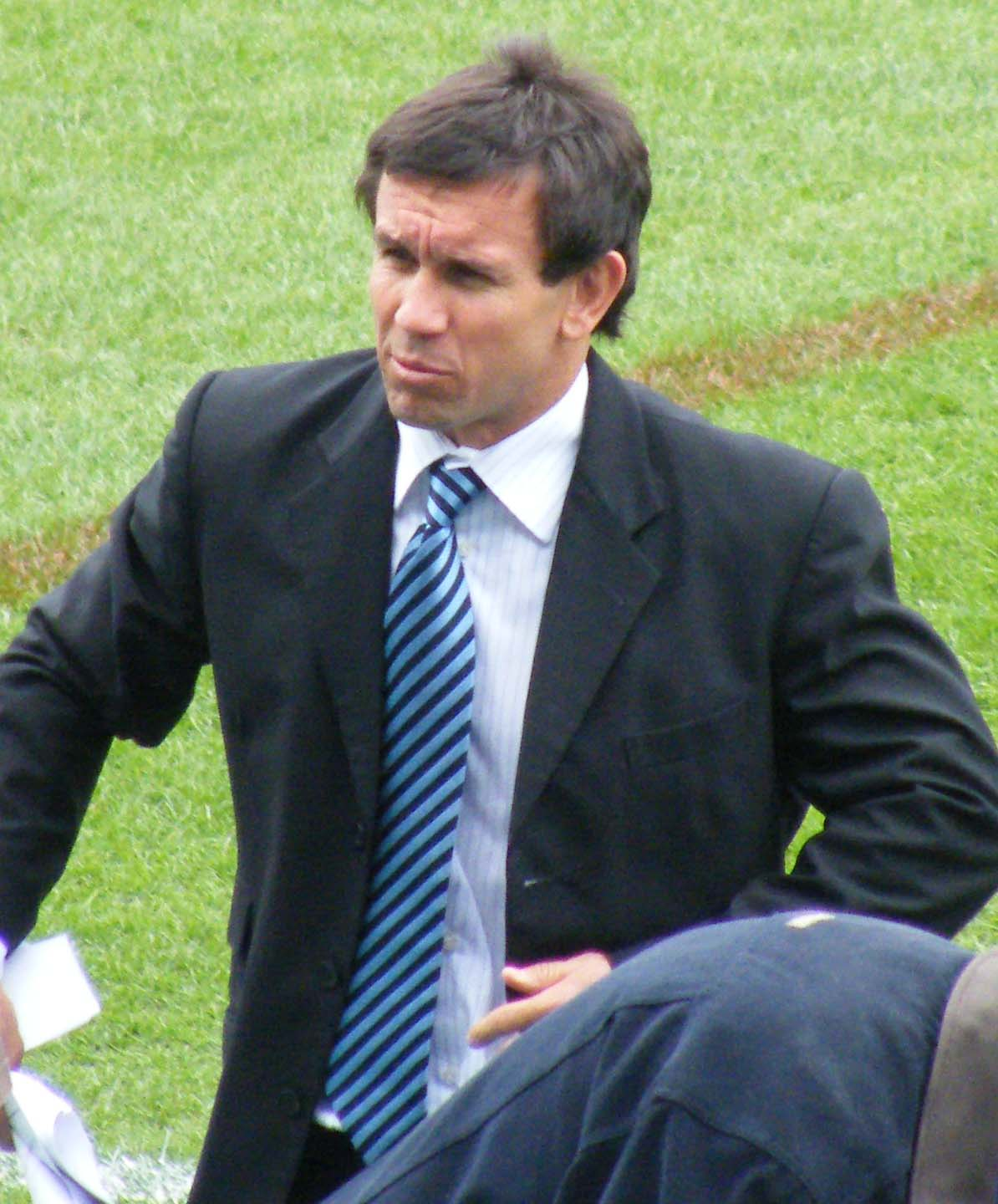
Johns in October 2008

Johns was indefinitely stood down from his position on the Nine Network in May 2009 after the airing of the Four Corners program. He was subsequently replaced by Phil Gould. He was asked by Channel 9 to make a comeback to commentary later in the season but Johns declined.

Towards the end of 2009, Johns turned down a $600,000-a-year contract with Channel 9 in favour of starting up his own production company alongside John Singleton.

In 2010, Johns signed with rival network Channel Seven and launched a new family-friendly, NRL/entertainment show on 25 March at 7:30pm in NSW and Queensland. After one season, the show was discontinued.

In 2012, Johns joined Fox Sports (Australia) as part of their rugby league coverage. He is the host of his own show "Sunday Night with Matty Johns".

=== Author ===
In 2004, Johns released Reg Reagan's 'This Is My Life' through Pan Macmillan.

=== Radio ===
In March 2011 Johns joined Triple M Sydney's breakfast show The Grill Team introducing a number of character impersonations including "Bruce", the effeminate producer for Triple M's sister station 2Day FM's breakfast team Kyle and Jackie O; the crude coal-mining magnate (and owner of the Newcastle Knights) Nathan Tinkler; and the rugby league greats Andrew Johns, Brad Fittler and Darren Lockyer as the "Future Immortals Gone Nuts". His last day in the Grill Team was on 7 December 2018. Johns currently work on SEN radio's "Morning Glory with Matty Johns" program. In June 2023, his brother Andrew Johns quit the show after a public falling out over comments Matthew Johns made about Queensland ahead of the 2023 State of Origin series.

== Personal life ==
Johns is founder and co-owner of Steel City Beer Company with Andrew Johns, Danny Buderus, Kurt Gidley and Matt Hoy.

Johns' sons, Cooper Johns and Jack Johns, are former rugby league players.

== Works ==
=== Filmography ===
- In Search of the Holy Grail (1999)
- The Footy Show (co-host, 2000's)
- All of Me (DVD, 2004)
- Blood, Sweat and Beers (DVD, 2005)
- Footy Legends (2006)
- The Final Winter (2007)
- The Matty Johns Show (host, 2010)
- Fox Sports Rugby League Coverage (host of Monday Night Football, 2012–present)
- Monday Night with Matty Johns (host, 2013)
- The late show with Matty Johns

=== Songs ===
- "Rugby League Outlaw" (2005)
- "Video Killed the Football Star" (2008)

=== Books ===
- This Is My Life (2004) ISBN 1-4050-3609-5
- From The Sheds (2008) ISBN 0-7322-8651-4
