= Jack Johns (rugby league) =

Italian international rugby league footballer

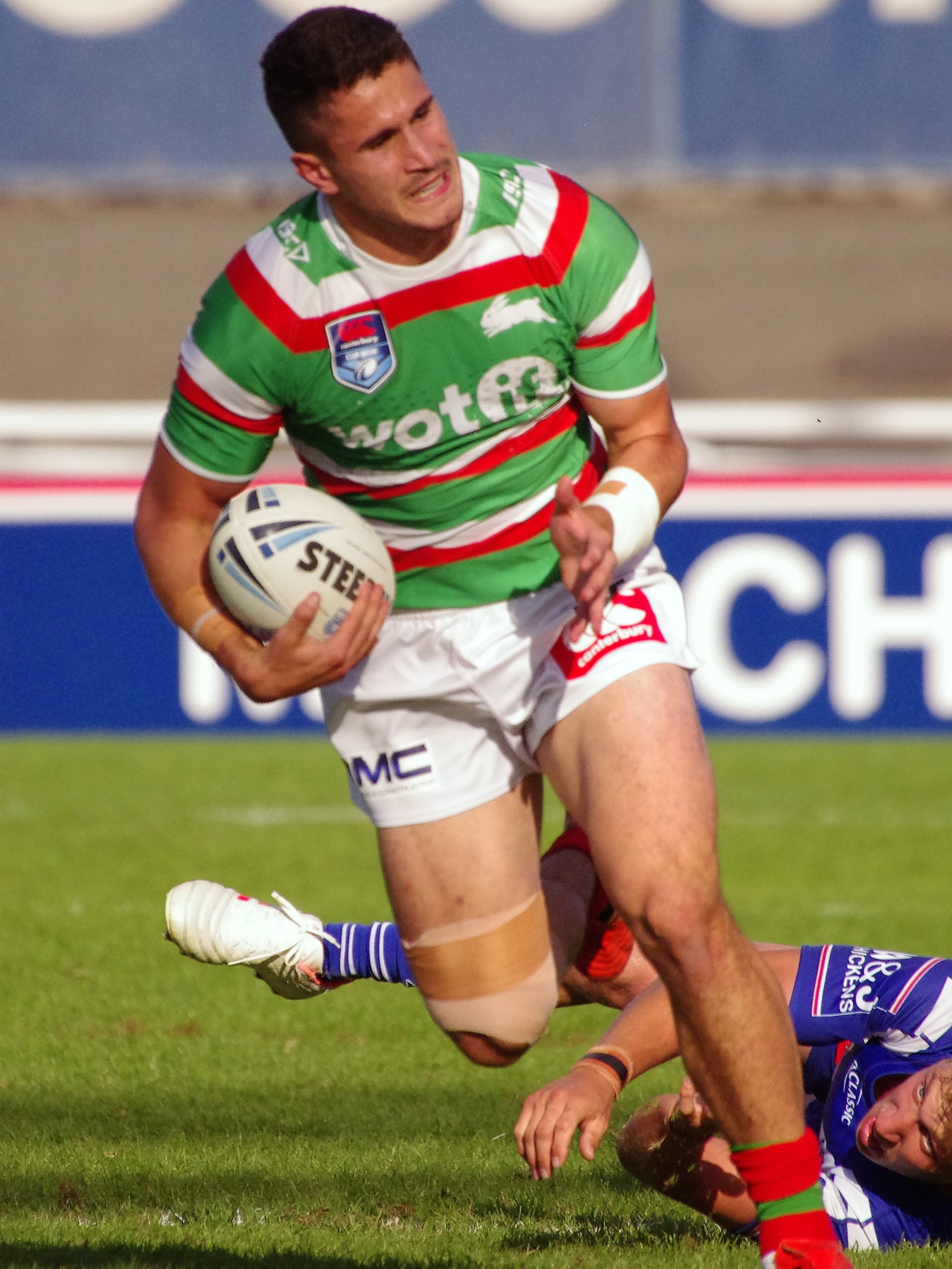

Personal information
- Born: 15 October 1997 (age 29) Newcastle, New South Wales, Australia
- Height: 188 cm (6 ft 2 in)
- Weight: 98 kg (15 st 6 lb)

Playing information
- Position: Second-row, Lock
Club
Years	Team	Pld	T	G	FG	P
2020	South Sydney	2	0	0	0	0
2021–23	Newcastle Knights	14	2	0	0	8
	Total	16	2	0	0	8
Representative
Years	Team	Pld	T	G	FG	P
2017	Italy	1	0	0	0	0
- Source: As of 16 September 2023
- Father: Matthew Johns
- Relatives: Andrew Johns (uncle); Cooper Johns (brother)

Jack Johns (born 15 October 1997) is an Australian former professional rugby league footballer who played as a second-row forward.

He previously played for the South Sydney Rabbitohs and Newcastle Knights in the National Rugby League and has represented Italy at international level.

== Background ==
Johns was born in Newcastle, New South Wales, Australia. He is of Italian descent from his mother's side.

He played his junior rugby league for the Harbord United Devils.

Johns is the son of former Newcastle Knights player and Australian international Matthew Johns, and the nephew of rugby league Immortal Andrew Johns.

His brother Cooper Johns previously played for the Melbourne Storm.

== Playing career ==
=== Early career ===
After finishing up with Harbord, Johns played for the Peninsula Seagulls in the Sydney Shield, where he was coached by Craig Gower.

=== 2017 ===
In 2017, Johns joined the Newcastle Knights, the same club his father Matthew and uncle Andrew had played over a combined 400 matches for, and won a premiership together with in 1997. He played 24 matches for their 2017 Holden Cup (Under-20s) team. In October, he was named in the Italian national squad for the 2017 World Cup. He played at halfback in Italy's match against Ireland, suffering a broken arm in the second half which ruled him out for the remainder of the tournament.

=== 2018 ===
In 2018, Johns alternated between the Knights' Intrust Super Premiership NSW team and the Western Suburbs Rosellas in the Newcastle Rugby League. He parted ways with the Knights at the end of the season.

=== 2019 ===
In 2019, Johns joined South Sydney. On 15 August, it was announced that Johns had signed a contract extension with Souths keeping him at the club until the end of 2020.

=== 2020 ===
In round 11 of the 2020 NRL season, Johns made his first grade debut for South Sydney against the Canberra Raiders at GIO Stadium.

In November, Johns was released by South Sydney and subsequently signed a one-year development contract with Newcastle for the 2021 season.

=== 2021 ===
In round 13 of the 2021 NRL season, he made his club debut for Newcastle in a 40–4 loss against Parramatta.

=== 2023 ===
After playing 14 games for the Newcastle club, Johns parted ways with the club at the end of the 2023 season.
