= State of Origin series =

Australian rugby league series

State of Origin
- Current series 2026 State of Origin series
- Sport: Rugby league
- Inaugural season: 1982
- Number of teams: 2
- Country: Australia
- Holder: New South Wales (2026 men); New South Wales (2026 women)
- Total wins: Men's; Queensland (25 titles); New South Wales (18 titles); Women's; Queensland (19 titles); New South Wales (5 titles)
- Website: NRL website
- Broadcast partner: Nine Network
- Related competitions: Interstate series (1908–81); City vs Country Origin; Rugby League War of the Roses

The State of Origin series (Note: A State of Origin competition is a type of sporting event between players representing the state or territory from which they originate, rather than the one in which they reside) is an annual best-of-three rugby league series between two Australian state representative sides, the New South Wales Blues (NSW) and the Queensland Maroons.

Referred to as "Australian sport's greatest rivalry", the State of Origin series is one of Australia's premier sporting events, attracting huge television audiences and usually selling out the stadiums in which the games are played. It is regularly described as the pinnacle of rugby league, inclusive of comparisons with international competitions. Unlike any other football or sporting contests and competitions in the world, the two rival State of Origin teams only come into existence each year to meet each other.

Players are selected to represent the Australian state in which they played their first senior rugby league game (either high school or local senior club). Before 1980 players were only selected for interstate matches based on where they were playing their club football at the time. Queensland was not generally competitive under these selection rules, with a total record of 54 wins, 8 draws, and 159 losses, as their smaller economy and ban on poker machines meant that leagues clubs could not compete and the vast majority of elite players ended up playing in the much richer Sydney Rugby League premiership.

In both 1980 and 1981, there were two interstate matches under the old selection rules and one experimental "State of Origin" match. From 1982 onwards a best-of-three match series has been played around the middle of the rugby league season for the State of Origin shield. During the early years the overall series results remained relatively even, but Queensland surged ahead between 2006 and 2017, winning 11 out of 12 series, including a record eight series in a row.

== Teams & Colours ==
Since the 1908 establishment of rugby league in Australia, the sport's two major states, New South Wales and Queensland, have played representative matches against each other which have continued into the "State of Origin" era, which began in 1980.

The two states' teams are popularly referred to as the Blues (NSW) and Maroons (Queensland), reflecting the respective colours of their jerseys. These selections originated with the predecessor state rugby union teams with NSW in 1891 and Queensland in 1894.

The Blues team is administered by the New South Wales Rugby League, and the Maroons by the Queensland Rugby League. The New South Wales team are sometimes referred to by the nickname "Cockroaches", and the Queensland team as "Cane Toads", due to names given to them by Barry Muir and Johnny Raper, respectively. It was reinforced by a marketing campaign used in the 1980s where the respective teams were caricatured as such.

While other Australian states and territories also have representative rugby league teams, they have not competed in the State of Origin (noting that rugby league in the Australian Capital Territory is under NSW for State of Origin player qualification rules).

== History ==
=== Interstate rugby league before 1980 ===
The first calls for a State of Origin selection policy in interstate rugby football came before the schism between the union and league codes eventuated in Australia. Selecting players for a representative side on their background history has been in use since 1883 for the rugby union Home Nations championship and in 1900, Sydney's sports paper The Referee contended this principal should apply to star Wallaroo FC and NSW rugby union player, Stephen Spragg, who had moved to Queensland for employment, should be made to play for the NSW team and not his new state. The idea was not adopted and Spragg played for Queensland.

Since the beginning of Australian rugby league in 1908, an interstate competition between New South Wales and Queensland has been conducted almost annually (apart from during WWI, Spanish flu and WWII). Until 1982, each team drew its players from the clubs based in that state. No consideration was given to the origins of the players themselves, other than if they had played for or declared loyalty for another country in rugby league.

The first of these interstate games was played at Sydney's Agricultural Ground on 11 July 1908, before Queensland had even commenced its club competition. New South Wales easily accounted for Queensland in a 43–0 victory. The local media were unimpressed.

There can be no doubt the NSW men are improving a good deal... They cannot be blamed for the farce, for it was nothing else. If the Australian team depends on Queenslanders to strengthen it, one is afraid it will be found wanting. They are quite the weakest lot of footballers I have even seen come down from Queensland. The play needs no detailed description as it was simply a practice match for NSW, and certainly did not advantageously advertise the new game.

— The Sydney Morning Herald, 13 July 1908

The interstate series was dominated by New South Wales, apart from a golden period for Queensland in the 1920s. From 1922 to 1925, Queensland defeated New South Wales 11 times in 12 matches. At the end of the 1925 season, a Kangaroo team was to be picked for touring Great Britain. Instead of announcing an Australian team dominated by Queenslanders, the Australian Rugby League Board of Control informed the media that the Rugby Football League had decided that the Kiwis would provide stronger opposition and that there would be no Australian tour. The period spanning 1922 to 1929 saw no Australian team play in Great Britain, the only such hiatus outside the two World Wars.

The New South Wales dominance of interstate football increased after 1956 when gaming machines were legalised for all registered clubs in New South Wales. This provided New South Wales football clubs with a revenue source unmatched by Queensland clubs. From this time on, an increasing number of Queensland players moved to the much stronger Sydney Rugby League competition, which then made them ineligible to play for Queensland in state selection. Paul Hogan famously told a Queensland Rugby League gathering in 1977 that "every time Queensland produces a good footballer, he finishes up being processed through a New South Wales poker machine."

Before 1956, NSW had won 75% and QLD only 25% of series played. From 1956 to 1981, NSW dominance soared even higher and QLD wins dwindled to only 3.8% with only 1 series win, in 1959.

=== Conception of State of Origin football ===
By the 1970s, the prestige of interstate matches had been seriously downgraded, in most part due to the fact that a number of Queensland players signed to NSW clubs could not unseat the NSW incumbent and also were not eligible for Queensland selection, so they did not play at all. Matches were played mid-week, so as not to interfere with the Sydney club competition, and the small crowds in New South Wales were hosted at suburban grounds. Interstate football reached its nadir in 1977 when the New South Wales Rugby Football League (NSWRFL) declined to host the Queensland team, and both interstate games were played in Queensland.

Former Queensland captain and Australian vice-captain Jack Reardon, who had later become a journalist, was the first to suggest that Sydney-based Queenslanders should be available for selection to represent their state.

Brisbane Courier-Mail reporter Hugh Lunn, Barry Maranta (the future co-founder of the Brisbane Broncos), and Maranta's business partner Wayne Reid played a part in persuading QRL chairman Ron McAullife that the concept could be used in rugby league. Lunn told McAullife that "you can take the Queenslander out of Queensland, Ron, but you can't take the Queensland out of the Queenslander." McAuliffe was initially skeptical. "What if we recall our boys from Sydney to play, and we are beaten. Where would we go from there?" Reid spoke to NSWRFL president Kevin Humphreys and suggested that a one-off State of Origin match could be used as a Test Match selection trial.

New South Wales clubs were reticent in their support of the concept and set two conditions:

- If the third game was to decide the series it was not to act as a selection trial, and also,
- that the expatriate Queenslanders would be under the supervision of a representative of the NSWRFL whose duty it would be to protect the interests of both the NSWRFL and the clubs to which they were contracted. (From 1980 this role was filled by Bob Abbott, a Cronulla-Sutherland Sharks official.)

Three Sydney clubs remained opposed to the plan: St. George Dragons, South Sydney Rabbitohs and Eastern Suburbs Roosters. As these clubs were refusing to release players, Humphreys threatened to make the game an official Australian Rugby League trial, which would make release mandatory. The clubs backed down.

=== Experimentation ===
After Queensland lost the first two interstate matches in 1980 (35–3 and 17–7, the second game in front of only 1,638 Sydneysiders) it was announced that a 'State of Origin' match would take place on 8 July at Lang Park in Brisbane. The New South Wales media gave both the event and Queensland's chance of winning it little credence, calling the game a "three-day wonder". Australia's 1978 captain Bob Fulton called the match "the non-event of the century". Ron MacAullife, however, was now committed to the concept and vigorously promoted the match. Thousands of tickets were sold before the game had been officially sanctioned. Although interstate matches in Brisbane had still been well attended (24,653 had attended the opening match of the 1979 series), few expected the sell-out crowd of 33,210 Queensland rugby league fans, delighted to see their heroes in the likes of Arthur Beetson representing their home state for the first time. Queensland convincingly beat New South Wales 20–10.

I was strongly against such a match, but last night's gripping clash showed that such a fixture would be a welcome addition to the League program.

— Alan Clarkson, journalist for The Sydney Morning Herald, 6 October 1980

In 1981, the first two interstate matches were again played under the old selection rules. As New South Wales won the first two matches in the series, State of Origin selection rules were used once more in the third match. Although New South Wales ran out to an early 15–0 lead in the game, Queensland rallied to win 22–15.

=== Adoption ===
The first State of Origin shield, depicting Queensland's Wally Lewis and New South Wales' Brett Kenny.

The interest generated by the experimental State of Origin matches of 1980 and 1981 and the potential for financial rewards were enough to convince the authorities to play all three games under the State of Origin rules the following year.

The State of Origin format is the only possible way to allow the interstate series to survive.

— Frank Hyde (2 June 1982)

Despite the Maroons' success so far in the State of Origin experiments, the New South Wales media dismissed the seriousness of the Queensland threat to the Blues' long-held dominance in series wins. Queensland, under the leadership of immortal captain Wally Lewis, was inspired by this, and for the first three State of Origin series, Queensland won 2 matches to 1.

However, in 1985, under the leadership of captain Steve Mortimer, New South Wales won the deciding match in front of 39,068 spectators at the Sydney Cricket Ground, claiming the series for the first time. The following year the Blues were able to go one better and complete the first State of Origin whitewash, taking the series 3–0.

=== 1987: American match ===
After Queensland had won the 1987 series 2–1, a fourth game was played at Long Beach, California to showcase rugby league to the American public.

The match was played at the Veterans Memorial Stadium in Long Beach, California, in front of 12,349 spectators. The Blues won the game 30–18.

On 15 July 2003, the Australian Rugby League announced that the fourth 1987 game was to be classified as an official match, and that a win in the State of Origin match on 16 July 2003 would take New South Wales into the overall lead.

ARL chief executive Geoff Carr said: "There had been some debate over whether the Origin fixture . . . in 1987 was counted as an official match but a search of ARL records has confirmed the status conferred on that clash by the game's governing body at the time. In announcing the match in Big League in April 1987, Ken Arthurson, the ARL's chief executive in 1987, was quoted as saying 'It's an exciting experiment but the match isn't and won't be billed as an exhibition match'."

=== 1990s ===
The Queensland halves pairing of Allan Langer and Wally Lewis led the Maroons in their 3–0 series wins in both 1988 and 1989. The rise of the Canberra Raiders in the then Winfield Cup club competition produced for the Blues the formidable halves combination of Ricky Stuart and Laurie Daley who brought New South Wales back from defeat in the opening game with two wins in the 1990 series. It was evident that as the rivalry between the two states grew, the Origin matches had become much more physical forward orientated game than the open running play seen in earlier series.

As the great Queensland players from the 1980s began to retire from the game, the Maroons struggled with a team of fresh faces and considerable inexperience. 1992, 1993 and 1994 series all went to NSW as the talent and experience of Blues players such as Brett Mullins, Daley and Stuart in the backs and Benny Elias and Bradley Clyde in the forwards gave the Blues the edge when the games were on the line. It wasn't until the upheaval of the Super League war in 1995 that the Maroons were able to again clinch a series.

The main cause for concern for Queensland was the fact that the Brisbane Broncos, its players and many other Queenslanders were not aligned with the ARL prohibiting any players signed with the Super League to play for the Maroons. Despite this, the Queenslanders won the 1995 series 3–0 in a shocking white-wash. The 1996 series saw the off-field contract dramas put aside as all players were allowed, regardless of contract, State of Origin selection. Having the majority of the Queenslanders back didn't help the Maroons though as the Blues 1996 white-wash with a 3–0 series win of their own.

The Australian game divided in 1997 into two competitions, one run by the ARL and one by the News Limited-owned Super League, and an interstate series was played in each. Under the Super League banner, there was a Tri-Origin series with a New Zealand side added to the competition. The ARL meanwhile stuck to its traditional format. The teams were selected using origin rules, and New South Wales and Queensland met twice. These matches do not count towards the official State of Origin record. As with the premiership, players were spread between two representative tournaments as well.

The competitions merged again in 1998 as the current National Rugby League, and the series that year proved to be enthralling as both sides won a game each away from home, setting up a decider at the Sydney Football Stadium where 39,000 fans witnessed the visiting Queenslanders take the series 2–1. The end of the decade saw a dramatic series with each side taking one game each and game three ending in a draw. Queensland was awarded the series as at the time the previous winners retained the interstate honors.

=== 2000s ===
The early to mid-2000s saw New South Wales starting to assert its traditional interstate dominance, causing some critics to question the future of State of Origin. However, this imbalance tipped in the third and deciding game of the 2006 State of Origin series, which is seen as the starting point of Queensland's unprecedented dynasty. Queensland followed by winning the 2007 series, as well as the 2008 series, which made Queensland's streak three series in a row. New South Wales won Game 1 on 21 May 2008; however, Queensland won Game 2 on 11 June 2008, and Game 3 on 2 July 2008. Queensland continued to follow this up by winning the first two games of the 2009 series becoming the first state to win four series in a row.

=== 2010s ===
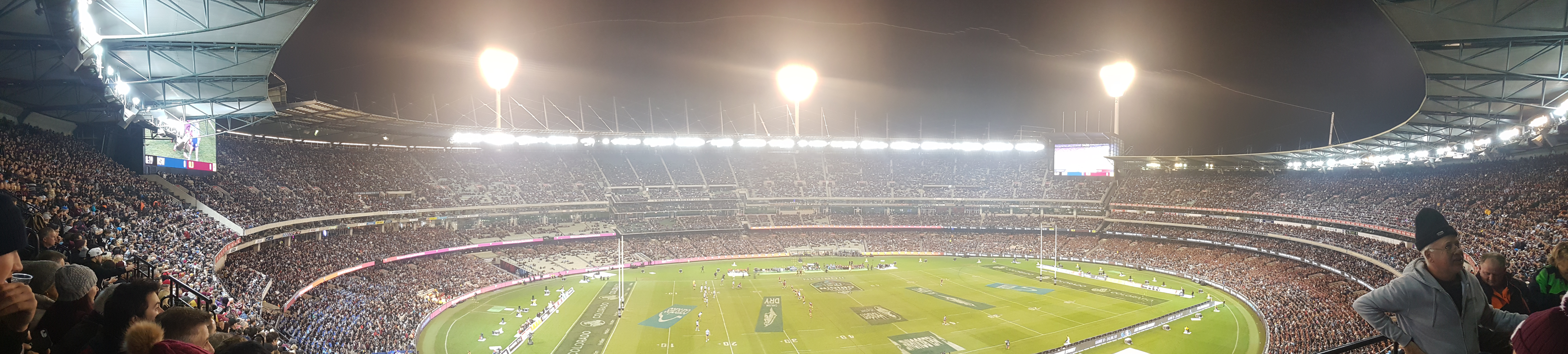
The first of the 2018 games, played at Melbourne Cricket Ground

In 2010, Queensland won its historic, record-breaking, fifth consecutive Origin series with a 23–18 win in the third and final match. This was the first Queensland team to win all three consecutive State of Origin Games in 15 years. Queensland full-back Billy Slater won the man of the match in the third game and was awarded the Wally Lewis Medal as Man of the Series in 2010. The 2010 State of Origin series was also the second televised program in Australia to be shot in 3D 1080i DVB-T as well as being simultaneously broadcast in regular 576i, 1080i DVB-T and PAL.

In the first game of the 2011 series, Queensland defeated New South Wales 16–12. In the second game, New South Wales defeated Queensland 18–8. Queensland won the series 34–24 in the 2011 decider in what was Queensland captain Darren Lockyer's 36th and final game. Cameron Smith won the man of the match in both the first and third game and was awarded the Wally Lewis Medal as Man of the Series.

In 2012, then NRL CEO David Gallop introduced the Under-20s State of Origin for Toyota Cup players which saw New South Wales winning. Queensland went on to win a historic 7th series win in 2012, winning the final game by 1 point.

In 2013, New South Wales defeated Queensland 14 to 6 in game 1, Queensland defeated New South Wales 26 to 6 in game 2, while in-game 3 Queensland defeated New South Wales 12 to 10 to take out the overall Origin title for the eighth consecutive time. The 2013 series set a new State of Origin television rating record for a whole series since the 2001 introduction of the rating system.

In 2014, New South Wales defeated Queensland 12–8 in the first game of the series, and 6–4 in the second. In the third game, Queensland defeated New South Wales 32-8 after scoring the first try of the game in the 37th minute, with Queensland leading 6–2 in the first half. This gave the Blues the first series win in 8 years.

In 2015, Queensland defeated New South Wales 11–10 in game 1 played in Sydney, New South Wales defeated Queensland 26–18 in game 2 played in Melbourne, Queensland defeated New South Wales 52–6 in game 3 played in Brisbane, winning the series 2–1.

In 2016, Queensland defeated New South Wales 6–4 in game 1 and clinched the series with a 26–16 win in the second match. New South Wales closed off the series with an 18–14 win over Queensland.

In 2017, New South Wales won Game 1, 28-4 sparking the New South Wales media to start proclaiming the beginning of the Blues Dynasty. Queensland won Game 2, 18-16 after making changes to the team with the returning Billy Slater and Johnathan Thurston, who kicked the winning goal for Queensland. Thurston injured his shoulder in the 30th minute of the match, essentially disabling it as he played out the whole match. Thurston was later ruled out for the rest of the year after scans revealed his shoulder needed a reconstruction, ending his representative career as he announced 2017 would be his last representative year. In Game 3, New South Wales went in with an unchanged lineup for all three games, the first to do so since 1996. Queensland dominated the Blues, winning 22–6, with Queensland winger Dane Gagai winning the Wally Lewis Medal for Best Player in the series. It also had Johnathan Thurston raise the Origin Shield with Queensland Captain Cameron Smith, before being chaired off the ground by his teammates, ending Thurston's representative career on a high note.

In 2018, New South Wales won their first State of Origin series in four years, defeating Queensland 22–12 and 18–14 in the first two games. Queensland scored a consolation victory 18–12 in the final game.

In 2019, Queensland defeated New South Wales in the first match 18–14. New South Wales then defeated Queensland 38–6 in the second and also won the third game 26–20. This was the first time since 2005 which New South Wales won a series decider and a consecutive series win.

=== 2020s ===
In 2020, Ampol became the naming rights partner of the series until at least 2023, taking over from Holden.

The 2020 series was originally due to be played during the middle of the season, but was shifted to the post-season for the first time in history, due to the COVID-19 pandemic which forced the suspension of all non-essential services in March. The series was played on consecutive Wednesday nights in November (4th, 11th, and 18th), with the venues for the fixtures designated as: Adelaide Oval, ANZ Stadium and Suncorp Stadium. Former New South Wales captain Paul Gallen and Daily Telegraph journalist Dean Ritchie notably described the Queensland team as the worst ever Maroons side. Game 1, held for the first time in Adelaide, saw Queensland beat New South Wales in a nail biting 18–14 win. At half time, the Blues were leading the Maroons 10–0, but a huge upset secured the game for Queensland. Game 2 held in Sydney, New South Wales, at ANZ Stadium, was a blue wave. Queensland scored the first try but eventually lost the game to New South Wales 34–10. Game 3 was held in Brisbane on 18 November at Suncorp Stadium and was a physical match which saw Queensland regain the shield with a 20–14 win over New South Wales. In his post game speech, Captain Daly Cherry Evans quipped "and on behalf of the worst ever Queensland team, thank you very much". A reference to critical comments made by former New South Wales Captain Paul Gallen. Cameron Munster was awarded the Wally Lewis Medal for his exceptional performances throughout the series, despite being out due to HIA for most of Game 2.

Game 1 of the 2021 series was held at Queensland Country Bank Stadium in Townsville on 9 June, moved from the MCG after another COVID-19 outbreak in Melbourne. This became the first Origin match to be played in a regional centre. New South Wales then recorded their biggest win in series history, defeating Queensland 50–6.

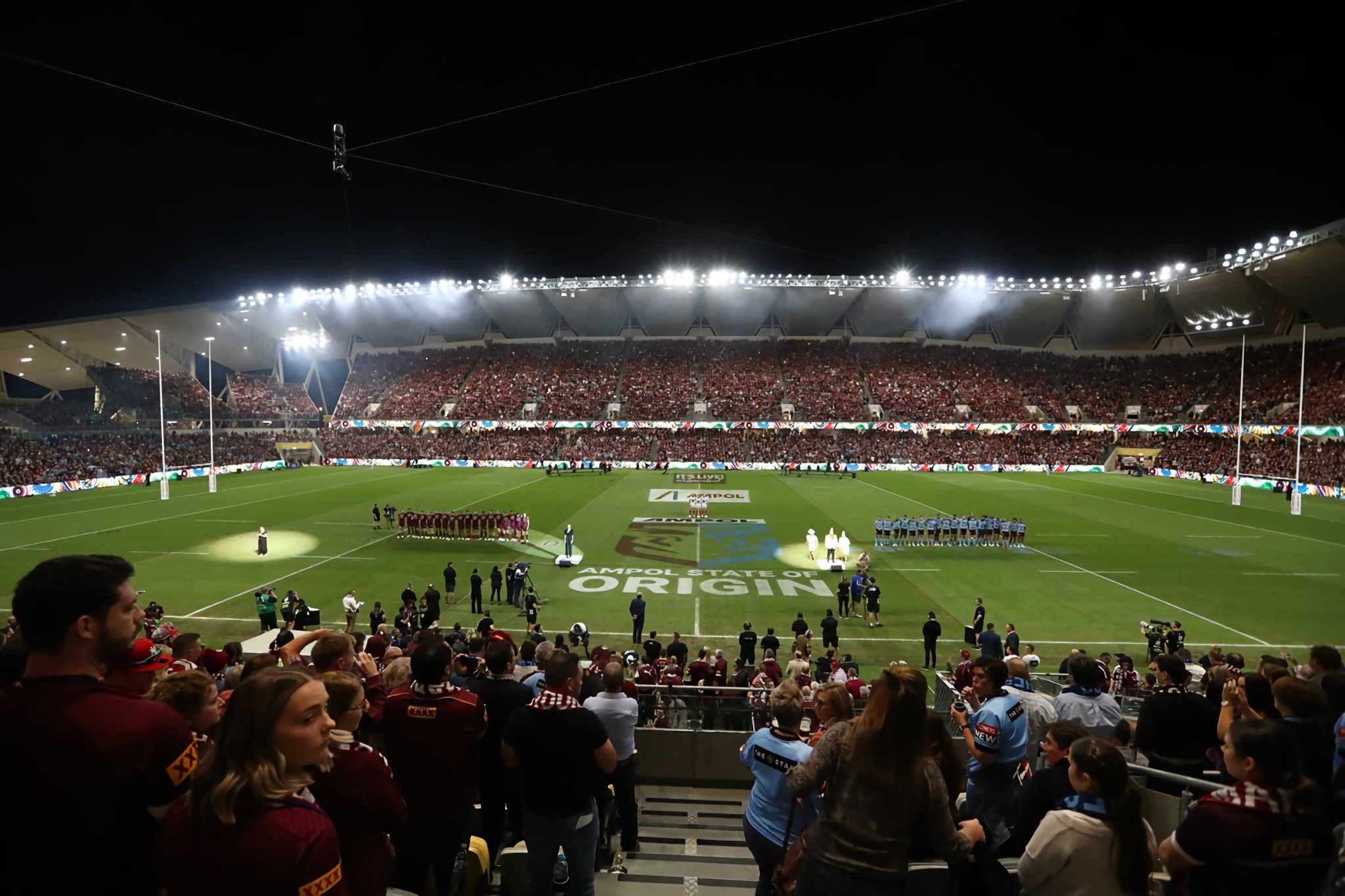
2021 State of Origin Game 1 Queensland Country Bank Stadium Performing the Australian National Anthem

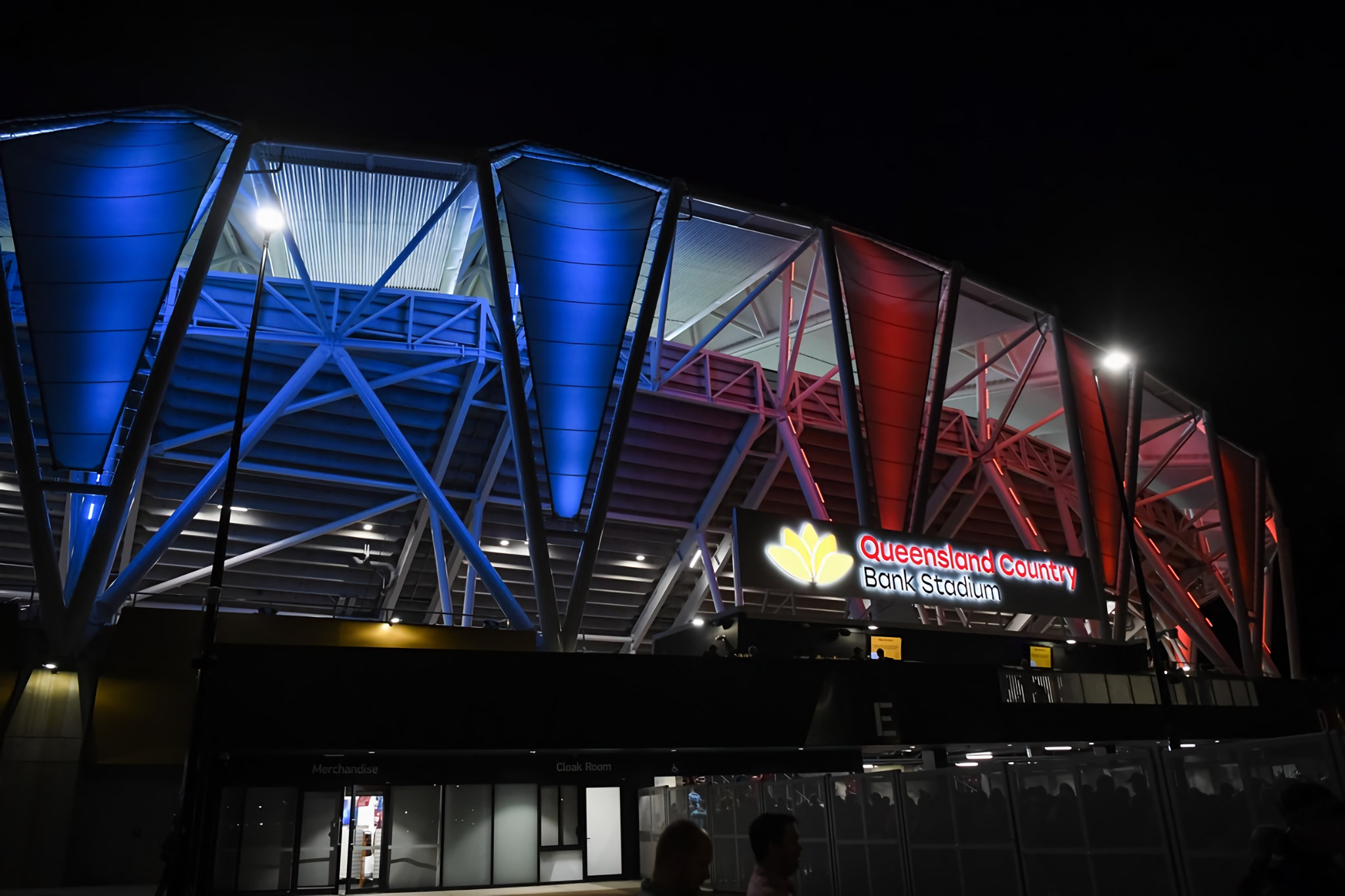
Queensland Country Bank Stadium for State of Origin Game 1 2021 in Townsville

NSW would go on to win the series with a 26–0 win against Queensland at Suncorp, with Queensland gaining a consolation win by defeating NSW 20–18 on the Gold Coast, with the venue being required due to the resurgence of the COVID-19 pandemic.

The 2022 series took place on 8 June 26 June and 13 July, being played at Accor Stadium in Sydney, Optus Stadium in Perth, and Suncorp Stadium in Brisbane with the notable addition of former player Billy Slater, as coach for the Queensland side. Queensland would go onto win the first game 16–10, with New South Wales hitting back on game 2 with a huge 44–12 finish. Game 3 finished in a nail biting 22–12 to Queensland, with Hooker Ben Hunt intercepting a mid-air kick from New South Wales halfback Nathan Cleary, securing the game with an 80 metre sprint to score. The game has been called "one of the greatest games in State of Origin history".

The 2023 State of Origin series began in Adelaide with Queensland winning game one after coming from behind in the second half. In game two, Queensland would win 32–6 in Brisbane to claim the series. New South Wales would win game three to avoid a clean sweep. In the wake of another series loss, Brad Fittler resigned as head coach of New South Wales.

The 2024 State of Origin series started on 5th June in Sydney and the last game was played on 17th July in Brisbane. The game was held at Accor Stadium, Melbourne Cricket Ground and Suncorp Stadium. New South Wales won the series after winning 2nd game in Melbourne and 3rd game in Brisbane.

The 2025 State of Origin series started on 18th May, and the last game was played on the 9th of July. The games were held at Suncorp Stadium, Optus Stadium and Accor Stadium. New South Wales won the first game 18-6, Queensland won the second game 26–24, and Queensland took the title again in the third game, 24-12 against the Blues.

== Venues ==
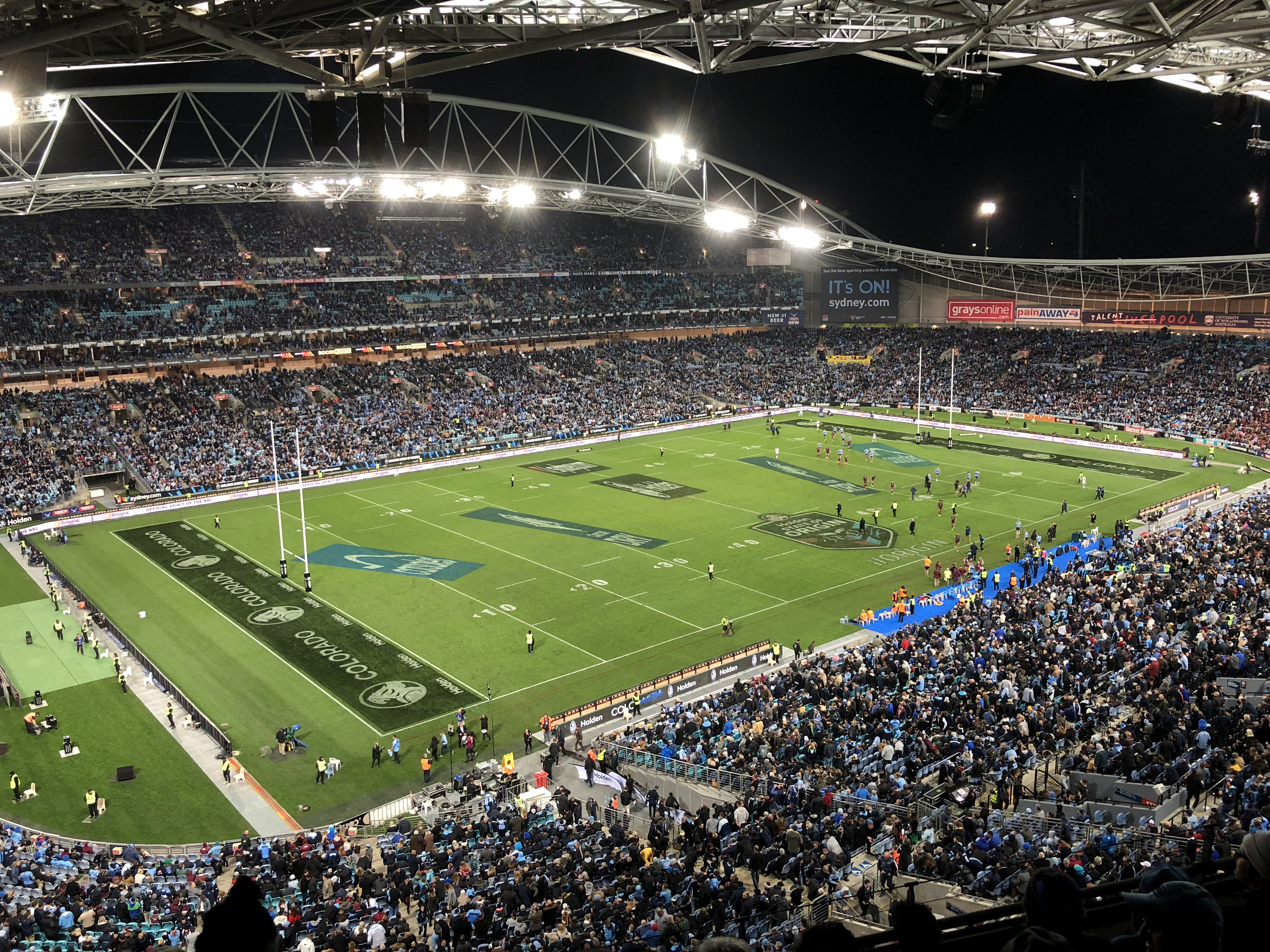
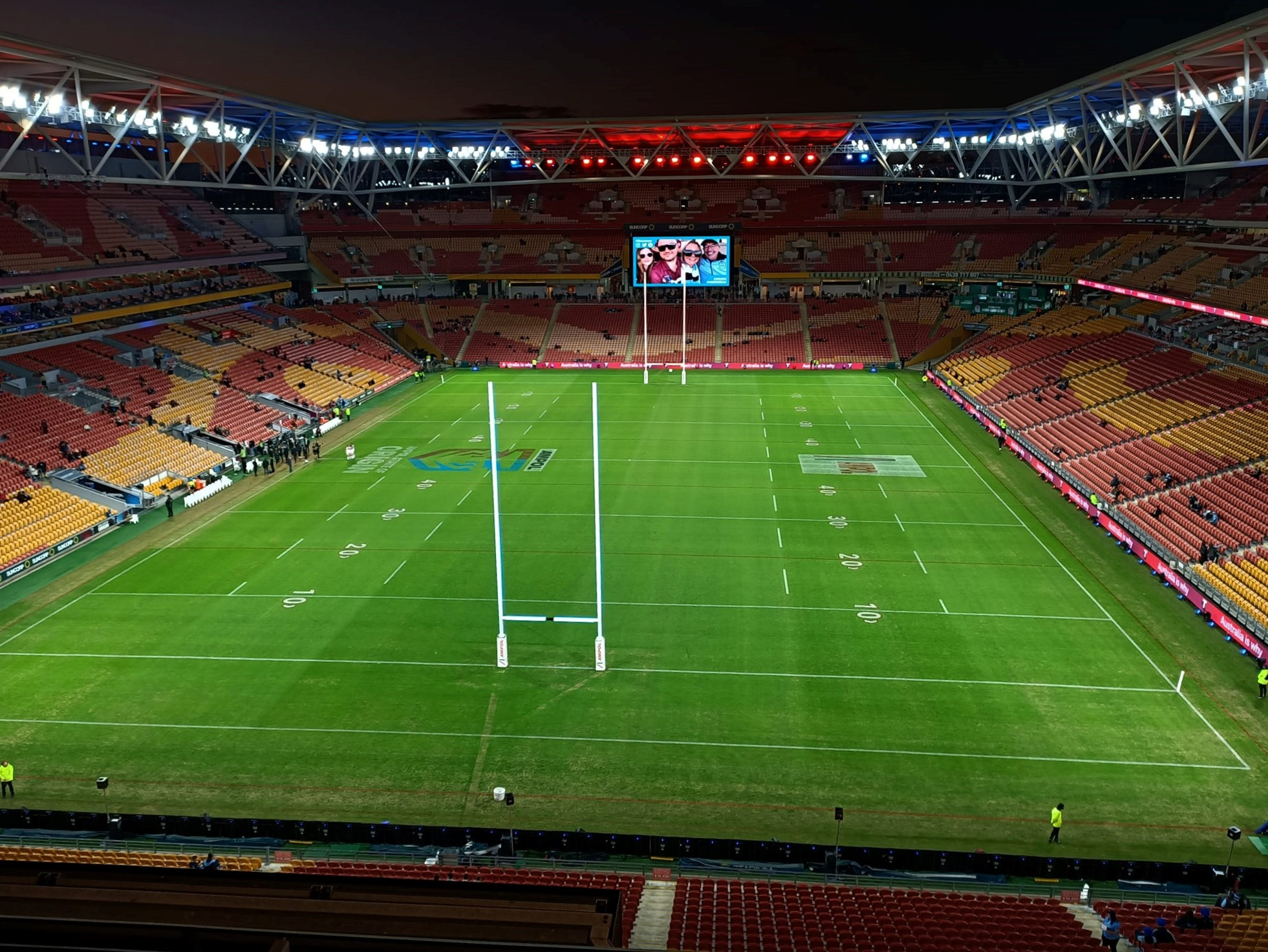
New South Wales's Stadium Australia (top) and Queensland's Lang Park (bottom) are the tournament's current venues, along with a third rotating venue.

=== Queensland ===
| Venue | City | No. of games | Year/s | Highest crowd | Lowest crowd | Average crowd | Aggregate crowd |
|---|---|---|---|---|---|---|---|
| Lang Park | Brisbane | 59 | 1982–2001, 2003–2025 | 52,540 | 16,559 | 42,544.05 | 2,510,099 |
| QSAC | Brisbane | 2 | 2001, 2002 | 49,441 | 47,989 | 48,715 | 97,430 |
| North Queensland Stadium | Townsville | 1 | 2021 | 27,533 | — | — | — |
| Robina Stadium | Gold Coast | 1 | 2021 | 26,307 | — | — | — |

=== New South Wales ===
| Venue | City | No. of games | Years | Highest crowd | Lowest crowd | Average crowd | Aggregate crowd |
|---|---|---|---|---|---|---|---|
| Stadium Australia | Sydney | 33 | 1999–2020, 2022–2026 | 88,336 | 36,212 | 74,480.58 | 2,457,859 |
| Sydney Football Stadium | Sydney | 14 | 1988–1998 | 41,955 | 16,910 | 37,345.43 | 522,836 |
| Sydney Cricket Ground | Sydney | 6 | 1982–1987 | 42,048 | 20,242 | 32,128.83 | 192,773 |

=== Interstate and international ===
| Venue | City | State | Country | No. of games | Year/s | Highest crowd | Lowest crowd | Average crowd | Aggregate crowd |
|---|---|---|---|---|---|---|---|---|---|
| Melbourne Cricket Ground | Melbourne | Victoria | Australia | 7 | 1994, 1995, 1997, 2015, 2018, 2024, 2026 | 91,671 | 25,105 | 75,092.86 | 525,650 |
| Docklands Stadium | Melbourne | Victoria | Australia | 3 | 2006, 2009, 2012 | 56,021 | 50,967 | 53,940.3 | 161,821 |
| Perth Stadium | Perth | Western Australia | Australia | 3 | 2019, 2022, 2025 | 59,721 | 57,023 | 58,700.67 | 176,102 |
| Adelaide Oval | Adelaide | South Australia | Australia | 2 | 2020, 2023 | 48,613 | 25,218 | 36,915.5 | 73,831 |
| Olympic Park Stadium | Melbourne | Victoria | Australia | 1 | 1990 | 25,800 | — | — | — |
| Veterans Memorial Stadium | Long Beach | California | United States | 1 | 1987 | 12,439 | — | — | — |

== Popularity ==
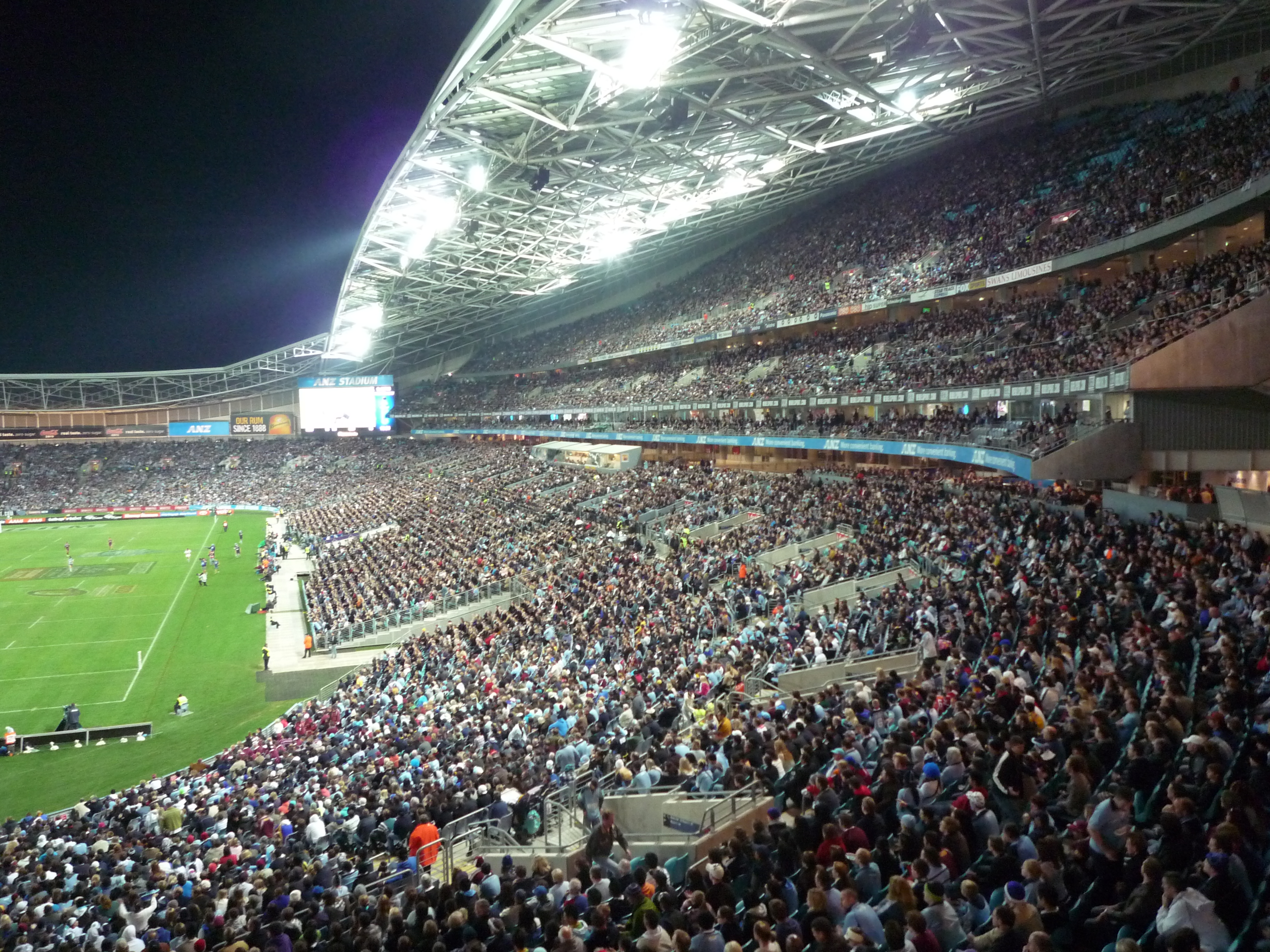
Crowds at the second game of 2009

In 2013, each individual game in the series drew a higher Australian television audience than any other sporting event, the only time this has ever happened.

In recent years the series has gained popularity outside of New South Wales and Queensland, with games played in Melbourne drawing record crowds for rugby league and local television ratings comparable to those of major AFL matches. Internationally, the series is televised in 91 countries, and is a national obsession in Papua New Guinea, occasionally sparking riots, violence and deaths. It also draws a strong following in neighbouring New Zealand.

== Broadcasting ==
Australian metropolitan television viewers since 2010
| Year | | Viewers (millions) | Yearly rank | Ref. |
|---|---|---|---|---|
| 2010 | G1 | 2.468 | 8 | |
| 2010 | G2 | 2.172 | 13 | |
| 2010 | G3 | 1.786 | 31 | |
| 2011 | G1 | 2.245 | 12 | |
| 2011 | G2 | 2.165 | 14 | |
| 2011 | G3 | 2.492 | 8 | |
| 2012 | G1 | 2.532 | 12 | |
| 2012 | G2 | 2.512 | 14 | |
| 2012 | G3 | 2.694 | 9 | |
| 2013 | G1 | 2.450 | 7 | |
| 2013 | G2 | 2.250 | 13 | |
| 2013 | G3 | 2.600 | 5 | |
| 2014 | G1 | 2.530 | 7 | |
| 2014 | G2 | 2.600 | 5 | |
| 2014 | G3 | 2.057 | 18 | |
| 2015 | G1 | 2.349 | 4 | |
| 2015 | G2 | 2.517 | 2 | |
| 2015 | G3 | 2.255 | 5 | |
| 2016 | G1 | 2.735 | 3 | |
| 2016 | G2 | 2.424 | 5 | |
| 2016 | G3 | 2.141 | 6 | |
| 2017 | G1 | 2.374 | 7 | |
| 2017 | G2 | 2.404 | 6 | |
| 2017 | G3 | 2.523 | 5 | |
| 2018 | G1 | 2.347 | 3 | |
| 2018 | G2 | 2.132 | 5 | |
| 2018 | G3 | 1.769 | 13 | |
| 2019 | G1 | 2.192 | 2 | |
| 2019 | G2 | 1.989 | 6 | |
| 2019 | G3 | 2.020 | 4 | |
| 2020 | G1 | 1.606 | 9 | |
| 2020 | G2 | 1.654 | 7 | |
| 2020 | G3 | 1.894 | 5 | |
| 2021 | G1 | 1.911 | 7 | |
| 2021 | G2 | 1.862 | 8 | |
| 2021 | G3 | 1.746 | 11 | |
| 2022* | G1 | 1.771 (2.529) | 1 (6) | |
| 2022* | G2 | 1.797 (2.632) | 1 (4) | |
| 2022* | G3 | 1.792 (2.611) | 1 (5) | |
| 2023 | G1 | 1.981 (3.293) | 1 (8) | |
| 2023 | G2 | 1.833 (3.044) | 1 (11) | |
| 2023 | G3 | 1.476 (2.505) | 1 (14) | |
| 2024 | G1 | 3.399 | 3 | |
| 2024 | G2 | 3.216 | 6 | |
| 2024 | G3 | 3.611 | 2 | |
| 2025 | G1 | 3.755 | 1 | |
| 2025 | G2 | 3.751 | 1 | |
| 2025 | G3 | 3.904 | 1 | |
| 2026 | G1 | 3.995 | 1 | |
| 2026 | G2 | 4.294 | 1 | |
| 2026 | G3 | 4.290 | 1 | |

Figures for broadcasts were originally measured across the five metropolitan areas (Melbourne, Adelaide, Perth, Brisbane and Sydney) from 2001 to 2023. However, following changes to the TV ratings measurement system in Australia in 2024, metropolitan figures were replaced by a new nationwide 'Total TV' figure, which includes regional and broadcaster video on demand (BVOD) streaming numbers in a single figure.

Within Australia, Nine Network is the main broadcaster for the series, with replays airing on Fox Sports. The series is also broadcast on radio by ABC Radio Grandstand.

Setanta Sports broadcasts live matches in Asia. In the United States, Fox Soccer televised all matches live using the Nine feed since 2011, with the coverage moving to Fox Sports 2 when Fox Soccer was discontinued in August 2013. Sky Sports broadcasts live coverage of State of Origin in the UK.

Roy and HG's State of Origin commentary was once broadcast on Australian youth radio network Triple J. This broadcast was presented by the characters "Rampaging" Roy Slaven and HG Nelson (played by John Doyle and Greig Pickhaver), who commentated the game with a comedic style. Roy and HG's broadcasts began in the late 1980s and continued until 2008. Roy and HG moved from Triple J to radio network Triple M in 2009, at which point the duo ceased their State of Origin commentary.

== Selection rules ==
Under State of Origin rules players were previously selected for the state in which they first played senior (or registered) rugby league. In 2012, the NSWRL, CRL, QRL and ARLC agreed on new criteria in determining Origin eligibility, to encompass other factors, such as place of birth. Players must also be eligible to represent Australia at international level. Previously, players capped by tier one nations (i.e. New Zealand and England) were also ineligible for selection; this restriction was repealed in 2026.

=== Controversy ===
From time to time, the selection of players under the State of Origin rules creates controversy. However, the place of birth has only been a relevant factor in eligibility since 2012. The issue was parodied in the song "That's In Queensland".

An issue of contention has been the selection of players such as Peter Sterling, Ken Nagas, James McManus, Israel Folau and Greg Inglis.

==== NSW controversies ====
Ken Nagas was born and raised in Queensland but decided to play for New South Wales, Peter Sterling was born in Toowoomba, Queensland but raised in Wagga Wagga, Newcastle and Sydney, all in New South Wales, while McManus was born in Scotland and was raised in the Northern Territory, but was ruled eligible to play for New South Wales in the 2009 series. New South Wales also claim players who were born and raised in the Australian Capital Territory, including Nick Cotric and Terry Campese.

==== Queensland controversies ====
Israel Folau was born and raised in New South Wales but is eligible to play for Queensland as he played his first senior rugby league match in Queensland.

Many other Queensland players were born outside the state yet played for the Maroons, such as Sam Thaiday (born in Sydney), Petero Civoniceva (born in Fiji), Adrian Lam (born in Papua New Guinea), Lote Tuqiri (born in Fiji), Michael Crocker (born in Sydney), Billy Moore (born in Tenterfield), Tonie Carroll (born in Christchurch), Karmichael Hunt (born in Auckland) and Brad Thorn (born in Otago region, NZ).

==== Inglis scandal ====
The selection of Greg Inglis by Queensland was the most controversial. The Queensland Rugby League selected him based on the reality that Brisbane Norths was Inglis's first senior football club, as per the eligibility rules at the time. However, some claim that schoolboy competitions count as senior football; and, with Inglis having previously played for Hunter Sports High School in Newcastle, New South Wales, in the Arrive Alive Cup, he should have played for New South Wales.

==== Notable cases of odd eligibility ====
Due to the clarification of selection rules, the Sims brothers are eligible for different States. Tariq and Ashton are eligible for New South Wales, while Korbin Sims is eligible for Queensland. Previously father and son combinations, such as Steve and Mat Rogers, have represented different states. This duo was especially notable because Mat was born in New South Wales and played for Queensland while Steve was born in Queensland and played for New South Wales. Steve Rogers played his first senior game of rugby league for the Southport Tigers on Queensland's Gold Coast, in an NSW CRL competition.

Foreign-born players have also represented each state. New Zealand has had several players, such as Brad Thorn, Ben Te'o, Craig Smith, Willie Mason, Tonie Carroll, James Tamou and Karmichael Hunt play Origin. Tamou's selection by New South Wales in 2012 was controversial as he was born in Palmerston North and played for the Junior Kiwis, lived in New Zealand until he moved to Sydney when he was 13 and was included in the New Zealand national rugby league team training squad for the 2011 Four Nations. Both Hunt and Tamou played for Australia before being selected for the State of Origin. Other players, such as Sam Kasiano and Jason Taumalolo are also eligible, creating concern in the New Zealand Rugby League. Apart from representing Queensland, Brad Thorn is also a dual rugby international, having played international rugby league for Australia, and international rugby union for the All Blacks.

Papua New Guinea–born Adrian Lam and Fijian-born Lote Tuqiri, Akuila Uate and Petero Civoniceva have also played Origin. Benny Elias was born in Lebanon and has played for and captained NSW. Mario Fenech was born in Malta and has played for NSW.

=== Anomalies ===
1. In 1995 and 1997 Super League players were made ineligible for the ARL State of Origin series selection. This included most of Queensland's usual team, who now played for the Super League affiliated Brisbane Broncos. The ARL hence decided to relax the rules in those years, allowing Queensland to select Adrian Lam who had previously played for Papua New Guinea. The 1995 Origin series was the scene of the biggest upset in Origin history when the relatively inexperienced Maroons swept aside NSW, who even without their Super League players could still boast several senior Origin and international players, 3–0.
2. During the 2000 World Cup several Australian players were granted dispensations to appear for other nations under the grandparent rule. The players affected were David Barnhill (NSW, Ireland), Kevin Campion (Qld, Ireland), Tonie Carroll (Qld, New Zealand), Graham Mackay (NSW, Scotland), Willie Mason (NSW, Tonga), Luke Ricketson (NSW, Ireland), Lote Tuqiri (Qld, Fiji) and Adrian Vowles (Qld, Scotland),

== Results ==
=== Year by year ===
Of the 45 full series played, Queensland has won 25 New South Wales 18, with 2 series drawn. However, on both of the 2 occasions there was a drawn series, the previous year's winner retained the title, with both being retained by Queensland, meaning Queensland have won 27 titles and New South Wales 18 titles. With the addition of three one-off games that were played in 1980, 1981 and 1987, the total number of games played is 135. Queensland have won 71, New South Wales have won 62, with 2 matches being drawn.

The series of 1999 and 2002 are considered drawn series, as both New South Wales and Queensland won a single game of each 3 match series, with the final game concluding in a draw. At that time there was no overtime rule to break the deadlock, and by the same set of rules, Queensland retained the shield as they were the previous holders. Due to the controversy around the second drawn series, and the rule awarding the series champions to Queensland, the rules were subsequently changed to rule out drawn matches and series. Equal points at the close of full-time are now resolved with the golden point method.

State of Origin series
| Year | Winner | Wins | Losses | Drawn | Shield holder |
|---|---|---|---|---|---|
| 1982 | Queensland | 2 | 1 | 0 | Queensland |
| 1983 | Queensland | 2 | 1 | 0 | Queensland |
| 1984 | Queensland | 2 | 1 | 0 | Queensland |
| 1985 | New South Wales | 2 | 1 | 0 | New South Wales |
| 1986 | New South Wales | 3 | 0 | 0 | New South Wales |
| 1987 | Queensland | 2 | 1 | 0 | Queensland |
| 1988 | Queensland | 3 | 0 | 0 | Queensland |
| 1989 | Queensland | 3 | 0 | 0 | Queensland |
| 1990 | New South Wales | 2 | 1 | 0 | New South Wales |
| 1991 | Queensland | 2 | 1 | 0 | Queensland |
| 1992 | New South Wales | 2 | 1 | 0 | New South Wales |
| 1993 | New South Wales | 2 | 1 | 0 | New South Wales |
| 1994 | New South Wales | 2 | 1 | 0 | New South Wales |
| 1995 | Queensland | 3 | 0 | 0 | Queensland |
| 1996 | New South Wales | 3 | 0 | 0 | New South Wales |
| 1997 | New South Wales | 2 | 1 | 0 | New South Wales |
| 1998 | Queensland | 2 | 1 | 0 | Queensland |
| 1999 | Draw | 1 | 1 | 1 | Queensland |
| 2000 | New South Wales | 3 | 0 | 0 | New South Wales |
| 2001 | Queensland | 2 | 1 | 0 | Queensland |
| 2002 | Draw | 1 | 1 | 1 | Queensland |
| 2003 | New South Wales | 2 | 1 | 0 | New South Wales |
| 2004 | New South Wales | 2 | 1 | 0 | New South Wales |
| 2005 | New South Wales | 2 | 1 | 0 | New South Wales |
| 2006 | Queensland | 2 | 1 | 0 | Queensland |
| 2007 | Queensland | 2 | 1 | 0 | Queensland |
| 2008 | Queensland | 2 | 1 | 0 | Queensland |
| 2009 | Queensland | 2 | 1 | 0 | Queensland |
| 2010 | Queensland | 3 | 0 | 0 | Queensland |
| 2011 | Queensland | 2 | 1 | 0 | Queensland |
| 2012 | Queensland | 2 | 1 | 0 | Queensland |
| 2013 | Queensland | 2 | 1 | 0 | Queensland |
| 2014 | New South Wales | 2 | 1 | 0 | New South Wales |
| 2015 | Queensland | 2 | 1 | 0 | Queensland |
| 2016 | Queensland | 2 | 1 | 0 | Queensland |
| 2017 | Queensland | 2 | 1 | 0 | Queensland |
| 2018 | New South Wales | 2 | 1 | 0 | New South Wales |
| 2019 | New South Wales | 2 | 1 | 0 | New South Wales |
| 2020 | Queensland | 2 | 1 | 0 | Queensland |
| 2021 | New South Wales | 2 | 1 | 0 | New South Wales |
| 2022 | Queensland | 2 | 1 | 0 | Queensland |
| 2023 | Queensland | 2 | 1 | 0 | Queensland |
| 2024 | New South Wales | 2 | 1 | 0 | New South Wales |
| 2025 | Queensland | 2 | 1 | 0 | Queensland |
| 2026 | New South Wales | 2 | 1 | 0 | New South Wales* |

State of Origin non-series matches
| Year | Winner | Wins | Losses | Drawn |
|---|---|---|---|---|
| 1980 | Queensland | 1 | 0 | 0 |
| 1981 | Queensland | 1 | 0 | 0 |
| 1987 | New South Wales | 1 | 0 | 0 |

== Wally Lewis Medal ==
The Wally Lewis Medal was awarded by the Queensland Rugby League for the Queensland player of the series from 1992 to 2003, when The Ron McAuliffe Medal replaced it as the Queensland exclusive award. From 2004 onwards it has been awarded to the player of the series irrespective of state, to the following players:

Recipients
| Year | Player | State | Position | Club |
|---|---|---|---|---|
| 2004 | Craig Fitzgibbon | NSW | Lock | Sydney Roosters |
| 2005 | Anthony Minichiello | NSW | Fullback | Sydney Roosters |
| 2006 | Darren Lockyer | QLD | Five-eighth | Brisbane Broncos |
| 2007 | Cameron Smith | QLD | Hooker | Melbourne Storm |
| 2008 | Johnathan Thurston | QLD | Halfback, Five-eighth | North Queensland Cowboys |
| 2009 | Greg Inglis | QLD | Centre | Melbourne Storm |
| 2010 | Billy Slater | QLD | Fullback | Melbourne Storm |
| 2011 | Cameron Smith | QLD | Hooker | Melbourne Storm |
| 2012 | Nate Myles | QLD | Second-row | Gold Coast Titans |
| 2013 | Cameron Smith | QLD | Hooker | Melbourne Storm |
| 2014 | Paul Gallen | NSW | Lock, Prop | Cronulla Sharks |
| 2015 | Corey Parker | QLD | Lock | Brisbane Broncos |
| 2016 | Cameron Smith | QLD | Hooker | Melbourne Storm |
| 2017 | Dane Gagai | QLD | Wing | Newcastle Knights |
| 2018 | **Billy Slater** | QLD | Fullback | Melbourne Storm |
| 2019 | James Tedesco | NSW | Fullback | Sydney Roosters |
| 2020 | Cameron Munster | QLD | Five-eighth | Melbourne Storm |
| 2021 | Tom Trbojevic | NSW | Centre | Manly Sea Eagles |
| 2022 | Patrick Carrigan | QLD | Lock, Prop | Brisbane Broncos |
| 2023 | Reuben Cotter | QLD | Prop | North Queensland Cowboys |
| 2024 | Angus Crichton | NSW | Second-row | Sydney Roosters |
| 2025 | Tom Dearden | QLD | Halfback | North Queensland Cowboys |
| 2026 | Nathan Cleary | NSW | Halfback | Penrith Panthers |

- **Bold** denotes player won it from the losing state.

== Records ==
=== Team ===
- Most games won: 71, Queensland
- Most series won: 25, Queensland
- Most titles: 27, Queensland
- Most consecutive games won: 8, Queensland (Game II, 1987 – Game III, 1989)
- Most consecutive series won: 8, Queensland (2006–2013)
- Most series clean sweeps: 4, Queensland (1988–1989, 1995, 2010)
- Largest winning margin: 46, Queensland 52–6 New South Wales (Game III, 2015)
- Most points scored in a game: 72, New South Wales 56–16 Queensland (Game III, 2000)
- Most points scored by a team: 56, New South Wales 56–16 Queensland (Game III, 2000)
- Greatest comeback: 20 points – New South Wales came from 0–20 down after 26 minutes to win 22–20 over Queensland (Game I, 2026)

=== Individual ===
- Oldest player: 36 years 98 days, Daly Cherry-Evans (2025) (Queensland)
- Youngest player: 18 years and 83 days, Ben Ikin (1995) (Queensland)

==== Playing ====
- Most games: 42 Cameron Smith (2003–2017) (Queensland)
- Most consecutive games: 36 Johnathan Thurston (2005–2017) (Queensland)
- Most games as captain: 30 Wally Lewis (1981–1991) (Queensland)
- Most games won: 24 Cameron Smith (2003–2017) (Queensland)
- Most series won: 11 Cameron Smith (2006–2013, 2015–2017) (Queensland) & Johnathan Thurston (2006–2013, 2015–2017) (Queensland)^{1}
- Most Man of the Match Awards won: 8 Wally Lewis (1982–1991) (Queensland)
- Most points: 224 Johnathan Thurston (2005–2017) (Queensland)
- Most tries: 18 Greg Inglis (2006–2018) (Queensland)
- Most goals: 101 Johnathan Thurston (2005–2017) (Queensland)
- Most field goals: 4 Andrew Johns (1995–2005) (New South Wales)
- Most points in one game: 32 Ryan Girdler (Game III, 2000) (New South Wales)
- Most points in one series: 52 Ryan Girdler (2000) (New South Wales)
- Most tries in one game: 3 (Chris Anderson, Kerry Boustead, Ryan Girdler, Lote Tuqiri, Matt Sing, Matt King, Dane Gagai, Valentine Holmes, Tom Trbojevic, Hamiso Tabuai-Fidow, Brian To'o, Selwyn Cobbo)
- Most tries in one series: 5 Ryan Girdler (2000) (New South Wales), Lote Tuqiri (2002) (Queensland)
- Most goals in one game: 10 Ryan Girdler (Game III, 2000) (New South Wales)
- Most goals in one series: 16 Ryan Girdler (2000) (New South Wales)
- Most field goals in one game: 2 Ben Elias (Game III, 1994) (New South Wales)
- Most field goals in one series: 2 Ben Elias (1994) (New South Wales), Andrew Johns (2003) (New South Wales)

1.Smith, and Thurston competed in at least one game associated with each series wins.

=== Coaching ===
- Most games: 30 Mal Meninga (2006–2015) (Queensland)
- Most games won: 19 Mal Meninga (2006–2015) (Queensland)
- Most series won: 9 Mal Meninga (2006–2015) (Queensland)

=== Other Records ===
Players still currently active are listed in bold.

Basic records
| Venue | Games | NSW | Drw | Qld | NSW pts | QLD pts | Total pts |
|---|---|---|---|---|---|---|---|
| Lang Park | 63 | 23 | 1 | 39 | 925 (154–157–5) | 1169 (198–120–8) | 2953 (352–377–13) |
| S.C.G | 6 | 3 | 0 | 3 | 68 (12–10–1) | 76 (14–11–0) | 144 (26–21–1) |
| Long Beach | 1 | 1 | 0 | 0 | 30 (5–5–0) | 18 (3–3–0) | 48 (8–8–0) |
| S.F.S | 14 | 6 | 0 | 8 | 189 (33–28–1) | 199 (34–31–1) | 388 (67–59–2) |
| Olympic | 1 | 1 | 0 | 0 | 12 (2–2–0) | 6 (1–1–0) | 18 (3–3–0) |
| M.C.G | 7 | 5 | 0 | 2 | 151 (26–23–1) | 126 (21–21–0) | 277 (47–44–1) |
| Stadium Australia | 34 | 21 | 1 | 12 | 643 (111–97–5) | 488 (86–71–2) | 1131 (197–168–7) |
| QEII | 2 | 0 | 0 | 2 | 32 (5–6–0) | 66 (13–7–0) | 98 (18–13–0) |
| Docklands | 3 | 0 | 0 | 3 | 42 (8–5–0) | 62 (11–9–0) | 104 (19–14–0) |
| Perth Stadium | 3 | 2 | 0 | 1 | 106 (18–17–0) | 54 (7–8–0) | 160 (25–25–0) |
| Adelaide Oval | 2 | 0 | 0 | 2 | 32 (6–4–0) | 44 (8–6–0) | 76 (14–10–0) |
| North Queensland Stadium | 1 | 1 | 0 | 0 | 50 (8–9–0) | 6 (1–1–0) | 56 (9–10–0) |
| Robina Stadium | 1 | 0 | 0 | 1 | 18 (3–3–0) | 20 (3–4–0) | 38 (6–7–0) |
| Totals | 138 | 63 | 2 | 73 | 2298 (391–366–13) | 2324 (400–363–11) | 4622 (791–729–24) |
Source: Rugby League Project Last updated: 9 July 2026

Leading try scorers
| Try Scorer | State | Games | Tries | Ave. |
|---|---|---|---|---|
| Greg Inglis | QLD | 32 | 18 | 0.56 |
| Darius Boyd | QLD | 28 | 17 | 0.61 |
| Valentine Holmes | QLD | 22 | 13 | 0.59 |
| **Hamiso Tabuai-Fidow** | QLD | 13 | 14 | 1.08 |
| Dale Shearer | QLD | 26 | 12 | 0.46 |
| Billy Slater | QLD | 31 | 12 | 0.39 |
| Dane Gagai | QLD | 23 | 12 | 0.52 |
| Josh Addo-Carr | NSW | 15 | 11 | 0.73 |
| **Brian To'o** | NSW | 17 | 11 | 0.65 |
| Michael O'Connor | NSW | 19 | 11 | 0.58 |
| Jarryd Hayne | NSW | 23 | 11 | 0.48 |
| Allan Langer | QLD | 34 | 10 | 0.29 |
| Tom Trbojevic | NSW | 10 | 9 | 0.90 |
| Darren Lockyer | QLD | 36 | 9 | 0.25 |
| **James Tedesco** | NSW | 26 | 9 | 0.35 |
Source: Rugby League Project Last updated: 10 July 2025

Leading point scorers
| Point scorers | State | Games | Tries | Goals | Field goals | Points | Average |
|---|---|---|---|---|---|---|---|
| Johnathan Thurston | QLD | 37 | 5 | 99 | 2 | 220 | 5.95 |
| Mal Meninga | QLD | 32 | 6 | 69 | 0 | 161 | 5.03 |
| Valentine Holmes | QLD | 22 | 13 | 51 | 0 | 154 | 7.00 |
| **Nathan Cleary** | NSW | 20 | 5 | 56 | 0 | 132 | 6.60 |
| Michael O'Connor | NSW | 19 | 11 | 42 | 1 | 129 | 6.79 |
| Andrew Johns | NSW | 23 | 4 | 37 | 4 | 94 | 4.09 |
| Ryan Girdler | NSW | 8 | 7 | 27 | 0 | 82 | 10.25 |
| Darren Lockyer | QLD | 36 | 9 | 22 | 2 | 82 | 2.28 |
| Greg Inglis | QLD | 32 | 18 | 0 | 0 | 72 | 2.25 |
| James Maloney | NSW | 14 | 2 | 31 | 0 | 70 | 5.00 |
| Darius Boyd | QLD | 28 | 17 | 0 | 0 | 68 | 2.43 |
| Dale Shearer | QLD | 26 | 12 | 6 | 0 | 66 | 2.54 |
| Rod Wishart | NSW | 22 | 5 | 23 | 0 | 66 | 3.00 |
Source: Rugby League Project Last updated: 9 July 2026

Appearance stats
| Players | State | Games | Years |
|---|---|---|---|
| Cameron Smith | QLD | 42 | 2003–2017 |
| Johnathan Thurston | QLD | 37 | 2005–2017 |
| Darren Lockyer | QLD | 36 | 1998–2011 |
| Allan Langer | QLD | 34 | 1987–2002 |
| Petero Civoniceva | QLD | 33 | 2001–2012 |
| Mal Meninga | QLD | 32 | 1980–1994 |
| Nate Myles | QLD | 32 | 2006–2017 |
| Greg Inglis | QLD | 32 | 2006–2018 |
| Wally Lewis | QLD | 31 | 1980–1991 |
| Brad Fittler | NSW | 31 | 1990–2004 |
| Billy Slater | QLD | 31 | 2004–2018 |
Source: Rugby League Project Last updated: 9 July 2026

Leading goal kickers
| Players | State | Games | Goals | Attempts | Success rate (%) |
|---|---|---|---|---|---|
| **Nathan Cleary** | NSW | 19 | 51 | 60 | 85.00% |
| **Sam Walker** | QLD | 3 | 12 | 14 | 85.71% |
| Jamie Soward | NSW | 3 | 9 | 11 | 81.82% |
| James Maloney | NSW | 14 | 31 | 38 | 81.58% |
| Mat Rogers | QLD | 5 | 12 | 15 | 80.00% |
| Jamie Lyon | NSW | 10 | 8 | 10 | 80.00% |
| Johnathan Thurston | QLD | 37 | 96 | 121 | 79.34% |
| Trent Hodkinson | NSW | 6 | 12 | 16 | 75.00% |
| Tim Brasher | NSW | 21 | 9 | 12 | 75.00% |
| Craig Fitzgibbon | NSW | 11 | 20 | 27 | 74.07% |
| Valentine Holmes | QLD | 16 | 28 | 38 | 73.68% |
| Darren Lockyer | QLD | 36 | 22 | 30 | 73.33% |
| Ryan Girdler | NSW | 8 | 27 | 37 | 72.97% |
| Cameron Smith | QLD | 42 | 16 | 22 | 72.73% |

Most points scored in a game
| Players | State | Tries | Goals | Field goals | Points | Game |
|---|---|---|---|---|---|---|
| Ryan Girdler | NSW | 3 | 10 | 0 | 32 | Game 3, 2000 |
| **Nathan Cleary** | NSW | 2 | 8 | 0 | 24 | Game 2, 2022 |
| Michael O'Connor | NSW | 2 | 5 | 0 | 18 | Game 1, 1985 |
| Lote Tuqiri | QLD | 3 | 3 | 0 | 18 | Game 2, 2002 |
| Johnathan Thurston | QLD | 0 | 9 | 0 | 18 | Game 3, 2015 |
| Zac Lomax | NSW | 2 | 5 | 0 | 18 | Game 2, 2024 |
| **Nathan Cleary** | NSW | 2 | 5 | 0 | 18 | Game 3, 2026 |
| Mal Meninga | QLD | 2 | 4 | 0 | 16 | Game 1, 1989 |
| Dale Shearer | QLD | 2 | 4 | 0 | 16 | Game 3, 1989 |
| Darren Lockyer | QLD | 2 | 4 | 0 | 16 | Game 3, 2001 |
| **Nathan Cleary** | NSW | 0 | 8 | 0 | 16 | Game 1, 2021 |
| Valentine Holmes | QLD | 2 | 4 | 0 | 16 | Game 2, 2023 |
| **Sam Walker** | QLD | 0 | 8 | 0 | 16 | Game 2, 2026 |

Series list
| Year | Winners | Games | Crowd average |
|---|---|---|---|
| 1982 | Queensland | 3 | 22,334 |
| 1983 | Queensland | 3 | 25,705 |
| 1984 | Queensland | 3 | 26,426 |
| 1985 | New South Wales | 3 | 30,301 |
| 1986 | New South Wales | 3 | 31,623 |
| 1987 | Queensland | 3 | 36,020 |
| 1988 | Queensland | 3 | 25,056 |
| 1989 | Queensland | 3 | 35,452 |
| 1990 | New South Wales | 3 | 32,817 |
| 1991 | Queensland | 3 | 35,715 |
| 1992 | New South Wales | 3 | 37,806 |
| 1993 | New South Wales | 3 | 35,465 |
| 1994 | New South Wales | 3 | 56,340 |
| 1995 | Queensland | 3 | 44,122 |
| 1996 | New South Wales | 3 | 39,480 |
| 1997 | New South Wales | 3 | 28,856 |
| 1998 | Queensland | 3 | 38,490 |
| 1999 | Draw (Queensland retain) | 3 | 55,267 |
| 2000 | New South Wales | 3 | 53,025 |
| 2001 | Queensland | 3 | 52,866 |
| 2002 | Draw (Queensland retain) | 3 | 59,417 |
| 2003 | New South Wales | 3 | 61,230 |
| 2004 | New South Wales | 3 | 67,770 |
| 2005 | New South Wales | 3 | 62,436 |
| 2006 | Queensland | 3 | 60,025 |
| 2007 | Queensland | 3 | 60,630 |
| 2008 | Queensland | 3 | 66,082 |
| 2009 | Queensland | 3 | 61,288 |
| 2010 | Queensland | 3 | 60,821 |
| 2011 | Queensland | 3 | 62,202 |
| 2012 | Queensland | 3 | 63,856 |
| 2013 | Queensland | 3 | 71,961 |
| 2014 | New South Wales | 3 | 61,896 |
| 2015 | Queensland | 3 | 74,712 |
| 2016 | Queensland | 3 | 64,604 |
| 2017 | Queensland | 3 | 61,730 |
| 2018 | New South Wales | 3 | 73,520 |
| 2019 | New South Wales | 3 | 64,826 |
| 2020 | Queensland | 3 | 36,862* |
| 2021 | New South Wales | 3 | 35,371* |
| 2022 | Queensland | 3 | 64,085 |
| 2023 | Queensland | 3 | 58,796 |
| 2024 | New South Wales | 3 | 73,251 |
| 2025 | Queensland | 3 | 63,254 |
| 2026 | New South Wales | 3 | 74,436 |

Asterisk (*) indicates series with limited attendance due to the COVID-19 pandemic.

== Under 19s ==
The Under 19s State of Origin has only had 4 seasons so far (2022 to present)

| Year | Winner | Wins | Losses | Drawn |
|---|---|---|---|---|
| 2022 | NSW | 1 | 0 | 0 |
| 2023 | NSW | 1 | 0 | 0 |
| 2024 | NSW | 1 | 0 | 0 |
| 2025 | QLD | 1 | 0 | 0 |
| 2026 | QLD | 1 | 0 | 0 |

=== Under 20s ===
The Under 20s State of Origin has only had eight seasons so far (2012 to 2019) with only one game a year, instead of three. New South Wales has won seven of the eight, with Queensland winning their first in 2018. They play for the Darren Lockyer Shield. It became Under 19 Origin in 2022, after the 2020 and 2021 editions were cancelled due to the COVID-19 pandemic.

| Year | Winner | Wins | Losses | Drawn |
|---|---|---|---|---|
| 2012 | NSW | 1 | 0 | 0 |
| 2013 | NSW | 1 | 0 | 0 |
| 2014 | NSW | 1 | 0 | 0 |
| 2015 | NSW | 1 | 0 | 0 |
| 2016 | NSW | 1 | 0 | 0 |
| 2017 | NSW | 1 | 0 | 0 |
| 2018 | QLD | 1 | 0 | 0 |
| 2019 | NSW | 1 | 0 | 0 |

== Women's State of Origin ==
The Women's State of Origin is the Women's rugby league version of the game. It has been running since 1999 and was originally known as the Interstate Challenge. From 2005, the Nellie Doherty Cup was awarded to the winner until being replaced with the a shield when the competition was brought under the State of Origin brand in 2018. The Nellie Doherty Medal was introduced as the player of the match award in 2018 and since 2023 it has been awarded to the player of the series.

=== Women's Under-19s ===
In 2019, a Women's Under 18s match was played as a curtain-raiser to the Women's State of Origin match. In 2021, the first Women's Under 19s State of Origin match was played.

== Wheelchair State of Origin ==
The first wheelchair rugby league match between Queensland and New South Wales was played in 2015 as the Wheelchair Interstate Challenge. Between 2019 and 2022 the matches were played under the State of Origin brand before the competition was renamed as the Wheelchair State Challenge in 2023.

== In popular culture ==
In an episode of the third season of the ABC Kids animated series Bluey titled "The Decider", Bluey, her family, and her neighbours Pat, Janelle, Lucky, and Chucky watch a third State of Origin match where Queensland win the series.

== See also ==
- National Rugby League
- City vs Country Origin
- Super League Tri-series
- International Origin
- Rugby League War of the Roses
- State of Origin
- Rugby league in Australia
- Affiliated States Championship
- Australian regional rivals – NSW vs. QLD
