= Reg Reagan =

Fictional character

Reg Reagan is a fictional character created by Australian rugby league player, Matthew Johns. His signature outfit is a false Horseshoe Moustache, A pillow stuffed in his singlet to resemble a beer gut and a shirt displaying his catchphrase "Bring back the biff" Referring to a semi satirical desire for fights in the sport.

In 2004, Reagan, released "Am I Ever Gonna See the Biff Again?" a song to the tune of the Angels' 1977 hit "Am I Ever Gonna See Your Face Again?".

== Discography ==
=== Singles ===
Title	Year	Peak chart positions	Certifiations
Title	Year	AUS	Certifiations
"Am I Ever Gonna See the Biff Again?" (with The Knucklemen)	2004	11	ARIA: Gold

== Awards and nominations ==
=== ARIA Music Awards ===
The ARIA Music Awards are a set of annual ceremonies presented by Australian Recording Industry Association (ARIA), which recognise excellence, innovation, and achievement across all genres of the music of Australia. They commenced in 1987.

Year	Nominee / work	Award	Result	Ref.
2004	"Am I Ever Gonna See the Biff Again?"	Best Comedy Release	Nominated	
