= Mario Fenech =

Malta international rugby league footballer

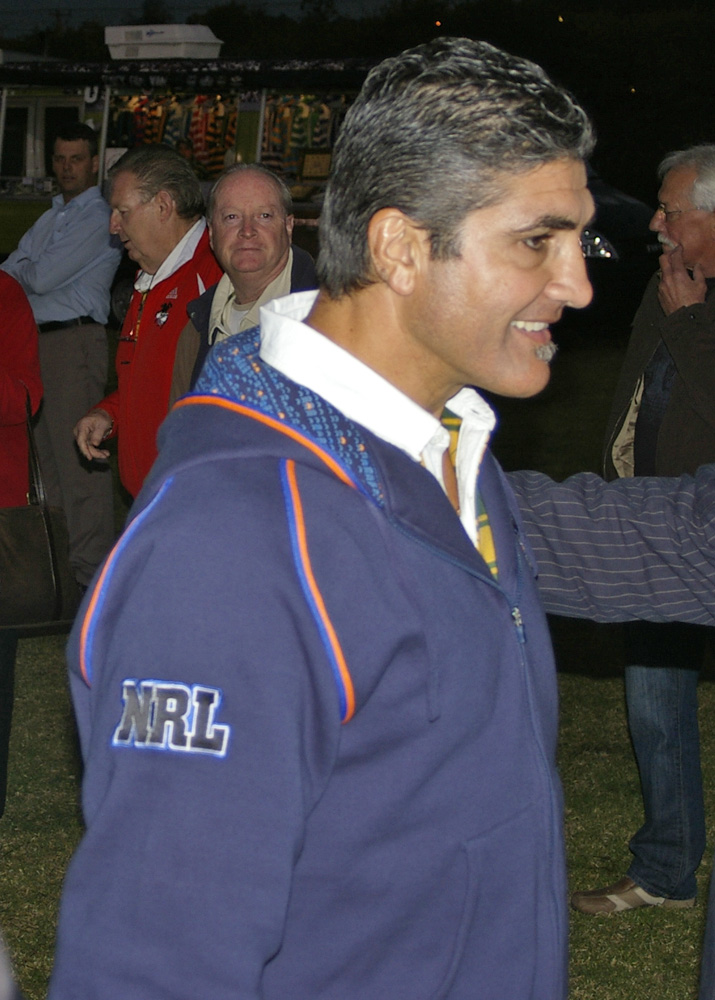
- Fenech in 2008

Personal information
- Born: 11 November 1961 (age 65) Valletta, Malta

Playing information
- Position: Hooker, Prop, Second-row
Club
Years	Team	Pld	T	G	FG	P
1981–90	South Sydney	182	18	0	1	73
1986	Bradford Northern	1	0	0	0	0
1991–94	North Sydney	83	4	0	0	16
1995	South Qld Crushers	11	0	0	0	0
	Total	277	22	0	1	89
Representative
Years	Team	Pld	T	G	FG	P
1988	Prime Minister's XIII	1	0	0	0	0
1989	City Origin	1	0	0	0	0
1989	New South Wales	2	0	0	0	0

Mario Fenech (nicknamed "The Maltese Falcon", “Falcon”, or "Muzza"; born 11 November 1961) is a Maltese Australian rugby league media personality. He is a former player of the game who had a lengthy career in the New South Wales/Australian Rugby League in the 1980s and 1990s. His favoured position was as hooker, where he represented New South Wales in State of Origin. In his later career, he became a prop-forward. A legendary figure for the South Sydney Rabbitohs, he captained the club for five seasons from 1986 to 1990.

== Rugby league career ==
Fenech made his first grade debut in round 15 of the 1981 NSWRFL season against Western Suburbs at Redfern Oval scoring a try in a 23-17 victory. In 1985, Fenech became captain of the South Sydney club. On 5 July 1988, Fenech (playing at hooker) was given the honour of captaining a Prime Minister's XIII side (a team that included past, current or future internationals Mal Meninga, Greg Alexander, Mark Geyer, Gavin Miller, David Gillespie and Glenn Lazarus) against the touring Great Britain Lions. The match, played in wet and muddy conditions at Seiffert Oval in Queanbeyan (near Canberra), saw the Don Furner-coached side defeat the tourists 24–16.

In 1989, Fenech was awarded with Dally M captain of the year as South Sydney claimed the Minor Premiership. Fenech also represented New South Wales twice that year during the 1989 State of Origin series. The following year, with Souths in financial crisis, Fenech made the difficult decision to join North Sydney. South Sydney would finish the 1990 season with the Wooden Spoon. In Fenech's first year at North Sydney, he played 24 matches as the club reached the preliminary final but fell short of their first grand final in nearly 50 years losing to Penrith. In 1994, Fenech played 25 matches as North Sydney once again reached the preliminary final where they lost against Canberra.

In 1995, Fenech joined the newly admitted South Queensland side and played in their inaugural game against Canberra. After his retirement from the ARL, Fenech represented Malta in a rugby league sevens tournament.

== Post-rugby league career ==
Since retiring from football, Fenech has been involved in the entertainment industry. In 2001, his book What's Doing? was published. He was a regular contributor (and butt of jokes) on The Footy Show, and has appeared on numerous other TV shows, including Pizza, and made a brief cameo in the rugby league-based film Footy Legends. During his stint on The Footy Show, footage was repeatedly replayed of him being unwittingly hit on the head with a football during a game between the Crushers and the Parramatta Eels in 1995; this clip led to the dubious honour of any inadvertent contact being made between the ball and the head of a player (in any sport, not necessarily rugby league) being dubbed a "Falcon" in the Australian lexicon. In 2022, Fenech's wife Rebecca revealed that Fenech often resented the way he was treated on The Footy Show.

Fenech ran as a local candidate in the City of Randwick in the 2012 New South Wales council election.

== Personal life ==
Fenech is an observant Catholic and was educated in the Catholic School system. He is married and has two children with his wife.

In 2016, Fenech revealed that he was suffering from early onset dementia, which he believes to be the result of years of head knocks and concussions suffered during his rugby career. By 2022 he had lost most of his memory of his playing career.

== Sources ==
- Author Profile at penguin.com.au
- Mario Fenech at IMDb
- "Warning on concussion as defence". The Age. 23 July 2004.
