= That's in Queensland =

2013 song and video by Denis Carnahan

"That's in Queensland" is an Australian song and viral video by comedian Denis Carnahan. The song parodies the selection of the Queensland State of Origin team for the annual rugby league State of Origin series.

== History ==
Under State of Origin rules players were originally selected for the state in which they were born or first played senior (or registered) rugby league. After several years, it was noted that Queensland had selected players born in New South Wales cities. Carnahan was inspired to write a parody song about it based on an advert for Bundaberg Rum. The song lists a Queensland player's birthplace, such as Sydney, Bowraville and Tenterfield with the question "Where is....(eg. Sydney)?", then follows with the statement "that's in Queensland"; the final line of each verse is "Queensland's everywhere". Though the song lists several Queensland players born outside of the state, Carnahan does mention in it that New South Wales Blues had done the same in selecting players not born in New South Wales.

In 2013 the selection rules were changed after Queensland selected Greg Inglis, who was born in New South Wales but first played junior rugby league in Queensland. The new rules then permitted for players to be selected based on their parents' birthplace or where they first played junior rugby league. As a result, Carnahan released an updated version of the song in 2013. Following New South Wales' victory in the 2014 State of Origin series, Carnahan released a new version where he apologised for the previous songs and named players who had been born in Queensland but ended with stating that the Origin Shield was in New South Wales.

== Cricket ==
Following the victory of the England cricket team in the 2013 Ashes series, Carnahan released a version of "That's in Queensland" called "That's in England" to parody the view that England were selecting players not born in England with references to players born in Pietermaritzburg, Londonderry, and Harare. Carnahan stated that it was an attempt to respond to England's Barmy Army. Former England and Kent player Geraint Jones expressed delight at hearing his hometown of Kundiawa, Papua New Guinea mentioned.

== Media reference ==
Despite being popular in Australian national media, Brisbane-based Courier Mail utilised the song's chorus to list several Queensland benefits to Australia with the view that New South Wales were only complaining due to Queensland's larger number of victories in State of Origin. In 2016, the song was referenced in media away from rugby league after Cate McGregor was named as Queenslander of the Year by the National Australia Day Council, despite living in Canberra and not having lived in Queensland for over 40 years.
