= Ryan Girdler =

Australia international rugby league footballer

Personal information
- Full name: Ryan Andrew Girdler
- Born: 19 September 1972 (age 54) Sydney, Australia

Playing information
- Height: 182 cm (6 ft 0 in)
- Weight: 93 kg (14 st 9 lb)
- Position: Centre, Five-eighth
Club
Years	Team	Pld	T	G	FG	P
1991–92	Illawarra Steelers	23	8	43	0	118
1993–04	Penrith Panthers	204	101	581	6	1572
	Total	227	109	624	6	1690
Representative
Years	Team	Pld	T	G	FG	P
1997	New South Wales (SL)	2	0	7	0	14
1999–01	New South Wales	8	7	27	0	82
1997	Australia (SL)	4	0	16	0	32
1999–01	Australia	10	8	24	0	80
- Source: RLP

Ryan Girdler (born 19 September 1972) is an Australian former professional rugby league footballer who played in the 1990s and 2000s. A New South Wales State of Origin and Australia international representative goal-kicking centre, he played his club football for the Illawarra Steelers and the Penrith Panthers, winning the 2003 NRL Premiership with the Panthers.

== Background ==
Girdler was born in Sydney, New South Wales, Australia.

== Playing career ==
Girdler first played in the New South Wales Rugby League for the Illawarra Steelers in 1991, playing his first game from the bench in a 26–14 win over South Sydney at the Wollongong Showground. During his time at Illawarra, he struggled with injuries and with the likes of Paul McGregor and Brett Rodwell cemented as the Steelers centre pairing, received few chances to reach his full potential. As a result, he usually found himself playing on the Wing for the Steelers, though in 1992, his form saw him play 20 games for Illawarra (12 in the centres) and take over the goal kicking duties from Rod Wishart. Girdler was the Steelers top point scorer in 1992, scoring 118 points from 8 tries and 43 goals from 66 attempts (65.15%)

This prompted a move to the Penrith Panthers in 1993 where he stayed for the rest of his career.

In 1997 he played three games for New South Wales in the Super League's Super League Tri-series. In the 1997 post season, Girdler was selected to tour England as part of the Super League only Australian team as a centre and goal kicker, playing two of the three matches of the Super League Test series against Great Britain.

The 1997 Super League season saw Girdler record his career best goal kicking figures when he kicked 76 goals from 82 attempts (92.68%) for the Panthers. With 197 points (11 tries, 76 goals and 1 field goal), Ryan Girdler was the highest point scorer for the Super League season (he finished one point clear of Cronulla's Mat Rogers). As this was the only SL season to be played in Australasia, this remains the all-time record number of points scored for the competition.

Following Super League, Girdler's standing as one of the best centres in rugby league was cemented when he was then selected for New South Wales in State of Origin. As the Super League War had ended at the end of 1997 with the Super and Australian Rugby Leagues merging to form the National Rugby League, the 1998 State of Origin series saw players from both the SL and ARL available for Origin selection (prior to 1998, Origin selection had only been open to ARL aligned players in 1995 and then again in 1997, though SL had their own 'Origin' in the form of the Tri-series which also included New Zealand).

Girdler was selected for the Australian team to compete in the end of season 1999 Rugby League Tri-Nations tournament. In the final against New Zealand he played from the interchange bench in the Kangaroos' 22–20 victory at Auckland's Ericsson Stadium.

In 2000 Ryan set one of his many records at Penrith, kicking 78 goals in the season. In the 2000 State of Origin series he set records for most points in a game (32 in game 3) and most points in a series (52). Later that year Ryan was selected to play for the Kangaroos in the 2000 Rugby League World Cup. Ryan scored three tries and kicked 17 goals for a 46 points in total when Australia defeated Russia 110 to 4 at The Boulevard in Hull.

In 2002, Ryan was once again injured, a knee injury ruling him out for half the season, despite the injury, Ryan was able to set another record at the Penrith club, scoring 28 points in a match against Manly-Warringah Sea Eagles at Penrith Stadium in July.

In 2003 he was injured in the opening round and did not make a return until round 14. 2003 was the last year that Ryan would represent Australia, scoring the first try in a game against Wales, 76 to 4. That season the Panthers finished minor premiers and went on to the grand final. In the 2003 NRL grand final Ryan played in the centres and had to come from the field with a calf injury in the Panthers' victory over the Sydney Roosters. After that he went on the 2003 Kangaroo tour of Great Britain and France, helping Australia to victory over Great Britain in what would be the last time the two nations contested an Ashes series.

His last game was the Preliminary Final loss to the Canterbury Bulldogs who went on to win the 2004 NRL premiership.

=== Records ===
Girdler was the top point-scorer in 1997's Super League premiership season. During the 2000 State of Origin he scored 32 points in one game, equalling Dally Messenger's for most points in an interstate game set 89 years earlier in 1911. His tally of 1,690 first grade points is the 8th highest in history and he was the first player to score 100 tries and kick 500 goals (a feat subsequently emulated by Canterbury's Hazem El Masri and Parramatta's Luke Burt).

==== Club-Penrith ====
- Most Points (Penrith): 1,572 (101 tries, 581/803 goals (72.35%), 6 field goals – 1993–2004)

==== State-NSW ====
- Most Goals (Match): 10 (2000)
- Most Points (Match): 32 (2000) record held with Dally Messenger (1911 for NSW)
- Most Points (Series): 52 (2000)
- Most Tries (Series): 5 (2000) record held with Lote Tuqiri (2002 for Queensland)
- Most Goals (Series): 16 (2000)

==== Country-Australia ====
- Most Goals (Match): 17 (2000)
- Most Points (Match): 46 (2000)

== Outside football ==
Girdler was a regular on the rugby league television show The NRL Footy Show, eventually gaining his own segment on the show in 2001 with a segment named Gone Fishin' and then an occasional recurring segment from 2002 titled Their House, a loose parody of Australian lifestyle program Our House. He is a regular on Triple M's NRL coverage. He owns cafes trading as Girdlers on Sydney's Northern Beaches in Dee Why, Westfield Warringah Mall, Manly and Avalon Beach. He also rejoined The NRL Footy Show as a co-host on the panel for its revamp in 2018.
