= History of the Newcastle Knights =

Newcastle Knights

Club information
- Full name: Newcastle Rugby League; Football Club
- Nickname(s): Novocastrians, Newy
- Colours: Primary: Blue; Red; Secondary: White
- Founded: 1987

Current details
- Ground: Newcastle International Sports Centre (33,000)
- CEO: Peter Parr
- Coach: Justin Holbrook
- Captain: Kalyn Ponga
- Competition: National Rugby League
- 2026 season: 5th

Home colours	Away colours

Records
- Premierships: 2 (1997, 2001)
- Runners-up: None
- Minor premierships: None
- Wooden spoons: 5 (2005, 2015, 2016, 2017, 2025)
- Most capped: Danny Buderus – 257
- Highest points scorer: Andrew Johns – 2,176

The history of the Newcastle Knights Rugby League Football Club goes back to their inception in the late 1980s. As part of the NSWRL premiership's gradual expansion into a national competition, a Newcastle-based club was admitted in 1988. The Knights have competed in every season of rugby league in Australia since.

== 1980s ==
A Newcastle rugby league team had been assembled from players in the Newcastle Rugby League to compete in various competitions for most of the 20th century. Newcastle had previously been invited to field a team in the NSWRL competition for the 1982 season, but declined, with the Canberra Raiders being admitted to the 1982 competition in their place.

The Newcastle Knights, along with the Brisbane Broncos and Gold Coast-Tweed Giants entered the NSW Rugby League competition in 1988 as part of the League's plans for further national expansion. Allan McMahon was their inaugural head coach.

== 1990s ==
Newcastle finished equal fifth place (with the Balmain Tigers) on the ladder in 1990. They were eliminated in the first round of the play-offs: 12–4 to the Tigers.

The club won their first competition, the Nissan Sevens, in 1991 and made the playoffs in 1992, where they were beaten by the St. George Dragons. The Knights made the semi-finals again in 1995 when the competition became the Australian Rugby League, and won the reserve grade premiership the same year.

The club remained with the Australian Rugby League during the Super League war, started by Rupert Murdoch in an attempt to win the television rights to rugby league; News Limited formed the Hunter Mariners to compete with the Knights, though the team was disbanded after the only season of Super League in Australia.

From 1997 to 2003, the Knights made seven finals series in a row. The Knights won the 1997 Australian Rugby League premiership, defeating the Manly-Warringah Sea Eagles 22–16 in the Grand Final, with Robbie O'Davis winning the Clive Churchill Medal. The match is best remembered for its classic finish - Darren Albert breaking a 16-all deadlock with his try 7 seconds from full-time. This win was a huge morale boost to the district following the closure of the area's biggest employer, BHP, being announced the same year. Seventy per cent of the winning squad were Newcastle juniors.

The following season, Knights players Robbie O'Davis, Wayne Richards and Adam MacDougall tested positive for performance-enhancing drugs; however, all three maintained they started use after the Knights' 1997 victory. The three were suspended, despite O'Davis' claims the club was not notified his drug was banned until after his positive test, and MacDougall's medical reason for taking the steroids (his usage continued after he completed his suspension, now approved by the NRL). In addition, the Knights terminated Wayne Richards' contract.

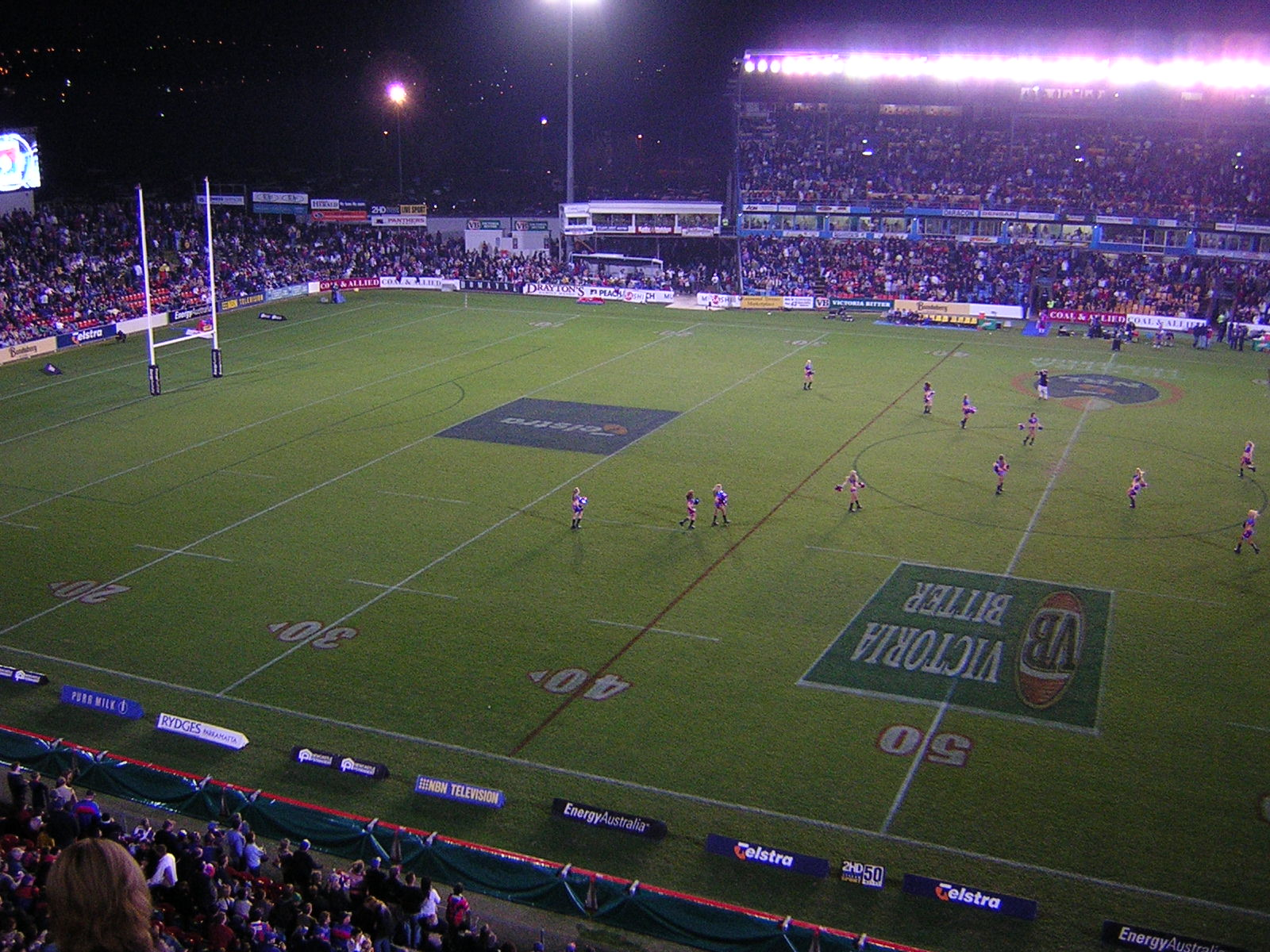
Newcastle International Sports Centre

In 1998, the Knights finished equal on competition points with the Brisbane Broncos, but finished second on points differential. In 1999, the Knights were in with a huge chance going into the final rounds only to lose their final two games of the regular season to finish 7th, before being knocked out a week later by Parramatta.

== 2000s ==
The Knights came third in 2000, only to fall one game short of the Grand Final in a heartbreaking loss to the Roosters. However this was followed by a National Rugby League Premiership victory over the Parramatta Eels in 2001, with Andrew Johns winning the Clive Churchill Medal. Newcastle were handed heavy underdog status, but shocked the Eels with a 24–0 halftime lead, and eventual 30–24 win. In 2002, the club finished equal with the New Zealand Warriors on competition points but, once again, finished second in the minor premiership due to inferior points differential.

Andrew Johns won the Dally M Medal for best player in the National Rugby League twice in a row in 1998 and 1999, and won an unprecedented third Dally M Medal in 2002. In addition, Joey Johns also won the Provan-Summons Medal (the people's choice award for player of the year) four years in a row from 1998 to 2001—the best performance by any player in the history of the award. In 2004, injuries plagued the club, with Andrew Johns and Ben Kennedy out for extended periods of time. The club missed the finals, finishing 10th despite strong performances from Matthew Gidley, Kurt Gidley and NSW State of Origin captain, Danny Buderus.

Following further injuries and a lack of experienced players, the club failed to win a single match in the first half of the 2005 premiership, losing 13 consecutive matches—the worst start to a season by any club since the 1966 Easts team lost every game in an eighteen-game season. That losing streak finally came to an end with a win away from home over the Penrith Panthers when they came from 14–0 down at halftime to win 28–24. In a tribute to the club's followers, crowds remained high throughout the losing streak, and while the Knights were unable to avoid finishing last, fans were rewarded for their stoicism as the team managed to win eight of their last eleven games, including a six-game winning streak brought to an end in round 26 by the St George Illawarra Dragons.

2006 boded well for the Novocastrians, with the side recruiting Great Britain and Irish winger Brian Carney and former Raider Luke Davico, as well as re-signing 2005 recruit Milton Thaiday and managing to retain the many promising young juniors (led by the likes of Brad Tighe, Jarrod Mullen, Reegan Tanner, and Riley Brown) that have come through in the club's worst ever season. Newcastle ultimately finished the season in fourth position, a stunning reversal in form, but were eliminated from the finals after losing 50–6 in the semi-final to the Brisbane Broncos.

Prior to the 2006 season kick-off it was announced that the club's longest serving coach, Michael Hagan would depart the club following the 2006 season to begin a three-year contract with the Parramatta Eels. Ironically, during the week of the 2006 season-opening game against Parramatta, the Knights confirmed Parramatta coach Brian Smith would take over coaching duties in 2007.

2007 was a year of turmoil for the club both on and off the field. After making a promising start to the season with victories over contenders such as the Canterbury Bulldogs - the club and rugby league world was rocked by the shock retirement of Andrew Johns. The departure of their captain and most influential player had an obvious effect on the team, and although they managed to stay in touch with the top eight until the last third of the season, their season was irreparably damaged by his absence. In addition to this - the Knights endured the worst injury toll in the 2007 season - fielding thirty seven players in first grade by season's end.

The club also struggled off-field, with Brian Smith's decision to release players such as Clint Newton, Kirk Reynoldson, and Josh Perry meeting with displeasure from the Sydney media and some sections of the Newcastle support base. Newton's defection to Melbourne and Reynoldson's threats of legal action over the club refusing to play him in the fifteen games required to trigger his fourth contract year saw the club's reputation dragged through the mud. The Daily Telegraph campaigned strongly for the sacking of Smith whilst Bluetongue owner John Singleton also threatened legal action after the releases lead to a multimillion-dollar advertising campaign being cancelled. To cap it all off, Andrew Johns again made the press late in the season after being arrested for ecstasy possession in the United Kingdom and confessing to having been a drug addict for the entirety of his playing career.

Before the final round of 2007, Tab Sportsbet's Glenn Munsie was reported in the Daily Telegraph saying that the Knights were certainties for the wooden spoon and "it was pointless taking money on the wooden spoon gong given Newcastle would be firmly planted at the bottom of the ladder by the end of the weekend". Despite these pressures, the Knights managed to avoid a second wooden spoon in three years - offloading the dreaded piece of 'silverware' to the Penrith Panthers with a last round victory over the Wests Tigers.

2008 was a resurgence year for the Knights. They were unlucky to miss out on the finals, going down to the Brisbane Broncos 24–2 in the final round of the competition, which allowed the New Zealand Warriors (who easily overcame the Parramatta Eels) to take 8th place.

The Knights started the 2009 season convincingly, they were placed 2nd in the ladder at round 10. During the season the Knights equalled their best home winning streak record with 9 wins, equalling the previous 9 wins recorded in 1995. Towards the end of the season coach Brian Smith announced he was leaving the Knights to join the troubled Sydney Roosters in 2010 after their horrific season. Over the next few weeks assistant coach Rick Stone was announced as the new coach of the Knights. The Knights toward the end of the season lost 3 games in a row, which put them in doubt for the finals, which they had looked like making all year. They then had an outstanding comeback to beat eventual grand finalists, Parramatta up the ladder. They finished the year 7th out of 16 after losing to the Bulldogs in week one of the finals. The Knights signed front rower Evarn Tuimavave for 2010. Rick Stone said he was looking forward to his first off-season in charge. On 16 December 2009 it was announced player Danny Wicks was involved in a drug bust involving amphetamines, cocaine and ecstasy. He was stood down. Eventually Wicks terminated his own contract as he did not want to keep bringing shame the club and sponsors.

== 2010s ==
Newcastle signed McDonald's and Coca-Cola as major sponsors for the 2010 season.

In March 2010 Chris Houston was served with notice to attend court on charges of supplying ecstasy and cocaine. He was stood down indefinitely.

June 2010 capped of a good period for the Knights after they confirmed the signings of 2009 Toyota Cup Player of the Year Beau Henry on a 3-year deal, 2009 Toyota Cup Centre of the Year Siuatonga Likiliki on a 2-year deal and former Australian international prop Antonio Kaufusi on a 2-year deal. In the next few days, the Knights also confirmed the signings of current Queensland Maroons star Neville Costigan on a 3-year deal and promising, young backrower Kyle O'Donnell on a 2-year deal.

The Knights finished 11th in the 2010 season. While the club did not play in the finals, Adam Macdougall recorded the most tries for the club and Akuila Uate equalled the most tries in a season marking an otherwise forgetful year for the Knights.

In December 2010, former Knight Chris Houston was cleared of all drug charges and re-signed with the club for 2 years.

On 31 March 2011, the Knights were officially taken over by mining magnate Nathan Tinkler after a member's vote in which Tinkler won by 97%.

On 12 April 2011, the Knights confirmed the signing of 'supercoach' Wayne Bennett. They finished 8th in 2011, being eliminated in the first week of the finals. After the 2011 season, the Knights cleaned out 15 players, as well as signing 9, including club legends Danny Buderus and Timana Tahu, Kangaroos winger Darius Boyd and Kangaroos forward Kade Snowden.

The Knights celebrated 25 years in the NRL competition in 2012. However, the season was a forgettable one. Captain Kurt Gidley succumbed to a shoulder injury early in the season which resulted in him missing the remainder of the year. The team failed to click and won only 10 of their 24 games to finish 12th. During the year, the club signed Willie Mason and Dane Gagai and both proved to be rare highlights in a poor season.

In 2013 the Knights in Round 1 started off with a strong win against the Tigers and then slacking off against the Sea Eagles in Round 2. Despite that they were consistent all year and finished 7th on the ladder, qualifying for the finals. The Knights then eliminated Canterbury-Bankstown before upsetting the Melbourne Storm by 2 points in Melbourne, but bowing out against the Sydney Roosters one game short of the grand final.

Newcastle weren't able to replicate their good 2013 season in 2014 and remained constantly in the bottom four before finishing 12th. During the season Wayne Bennett announced that he would leave the club at the end of the 2014 season to eventually coach the Brisbane Broncos from 2015 onwards.

== Miscellaneous History ==
=== Knights Team Of The Era ===
In August 2007 the Knights announced their team of 20 years. This team was:

No.

Position
Player

68 Robbie O'Davis – FB 128 Timana Tahu – WG 98 Matthew Gidley – CE 108 Mark Hughes – CE 102 Adam MacDougall – WG 73 Matthew Johns – FE 75 Andrew Johns – HB 39 Mark Sargent – PR 103 Danny Buderus – HK

No.

Position
Player

35 Paul Harragon – PR 126 Steve Simpson – SR 130 Ben Kennedy – SR 26 Marc Glanville – LK 37 Michael Hagan – positions 143 Kurt Gidley – positions 2 Tony Butterfield – positions 70 Adam Muir – positions Malcolm "Mal" Reilly – positions (coach)

== Coaches & Staff ==
=== First-Grade Coaches ===
- Allan McMahon (1988–1991)
- David Waite (1991–1994)
- Mal Reilly (1995–1998)
- Warren Ryan (1999–2000)
- Michael Hagan (2001–2006)
- Brian Smith (2007–14 August 2009)
- Rick Stone (15 August 2009 – 2011)
- Wayne Bennett (2012–2014)
- Rick Stone (2015)
- Nathan Brown (2016–2019)
- Adam O'Brien (2020–2025)
- Justin Holbrook (2026–)

== Jersey ==
=== Manufacturers ===
- Good Fellows (1988–94)
- Peerless (1995–96)
- Canterbury (1997–99)
- Fila (2000–01)
- ISC (2002–07)
- KooGa (2008–10)
- X-Blades (2011)
- ISC (2012–2019)
- O'Neills (2020–present)
Newcastle Knights - home jerseys

1988–1996

1997–2000

2001–2004

2005–2007

2008–2010
Newcastle Knights - away jerseys

Trial 1988

2000–2002

2003–2005

2006–2007

2008–2009

2010–2011
Newcastle Knights - heritage jerseys

2008

2009–2011

2012–present

== Alltime Wins & Losses Record ==
Games	Wins	Drawn	Losses
608	308	14	286

Last updated on 6 May 2012.

== Major sponsors ==
- Henny Penny (1988–1990)
- BP (1991–1993)
- Stockland (1995–1997)
- Impulse Airlines (1998–2001)
- Flight Centre (2001)
- QantasLink (2002–2004)
- Coal & Allied (2005–2011)
- Hunter Ports (2012–2014)
- Newpave Asphalt (2015–2017)
- nib Health Funds (2017–Present)

== Awards & Player's Achievements ==
=== Clive Churchill Medal ===
- Robbie O'Davis (1997)
- Andrew Johns (2001)

=== Dally M Medal ===
- Andrew Johns (1998, 1999, 2002)
- Danny Buderus (2004)
- Kalyn Ponga (2023)

=== Rothmans Medal ===
- Mark Sargent (1989)

=== Rugby League Golden Boot ===
- Andrew Johns (1999, 2001)

== Club Premiership Honours ==
Premierships: 2 (1997, 2001)

Finals Series: 14 (1992, 1995, 1997, 1998, 1999, 2000, 2001, 2002, 2003, 2006, 2009, 2011, 2013, 2020, 2021, 2023, 2024)

Wooden Spoons: 5 (2005, 2015, 2016, 2017, 2025)

== Club Records & Statistics ==
=== Individual records ===
Most Games: Danny Buderus (258)

Most Points: Andrew Johns (2190)

Most Tries: Akuila Uate (110)

Most Goals: Andrew Johns (920)

=== Club records ===
Biggest Win: 66–0 v Bulldogs (Rd 18, 2023)

Highest Score: 70–32 v Raiders (Rd 2, 2006)

Biggest Loss: 6–71 v Broncos (Rd 11, 2007)

Highest Score Conceded: 6–71 v Broncos (Rd 11, 2007)
