= List of Newcastle Knights records =

The Newcastle Knights are an NRL team based out of Newcastle.

== Newcastle Knights club records ==
=== General records ===
First year: 1988

First match: 5 March 1988 – played Parramatta Eels at the Newcastle International Sports Centre (lost 4–28)

Home ground: McDonald Jones Stadium (Note: Formerly known as Newcastle International Sports Centre, Marathon Stadium, EnergyAustralia Stadium, Ausgrid Stadium and Hunter Stadium) (maximum capacity: 33,000)

First grade premierships: 2 – 1997, 2001

Finals series: 17 – 1992, 1995, 1997, 1998, 1999, 2000, 2001, 2002, 2003, 2006, 2009, 2011, 2013, 2020, 2021, 2023, 2024, 2026

Wooden spoons: 5 – 2005, 2015, 2016, 2017, 2025

Top home attendances
Rank	Crowd	Round	Opponent
1	32,642	Round 17, 1995	Manly-Warringah Sea Eagles
2	32,217	Round 22, 1990	Balmain Tigers
3	30,729	Round 26, 2011	South Sydney Rabbitohs
4	30,251	Round 12, 1994	St. George Dragons
5	30,220	Round 6, 1988	Brisbane Broncos

Top attendances
Rank	Crowd	Round	Opponent	Venue
1	104,583	Round 1, 1999	Manly-Warringah Sea Eagles	Stadium Australia
2	90,414	Grand Final, 2001	Parramatta Eels	Stadium Australia

== Individual records ==
=== All-time ===
Most first-grade games
Rank	Games	Player	Career
1	257	Danny Buderus	1997–2008, 2012–2013
2	251	Kurt Gidley	2001–2015
3	249	Andrew Johns	1993–2007
4	238	Dane Gagai	2012–2017, 2022–2026
5	229	Tony Butterfield	1988–2000
6	223	Robbie O'Davis	1992–2004
7	221	Matt Gidley	1996–2006
8	216	Steve Simpson	1999–2010
8	211	Jarrod Mullen	2005–2016
9	190	Bill Peden	1994–2002
10	188	Marc Glanville	1988–1997

Most points
Rank	Points	Player	Career	Tries	Goals	F/G
1	2,176	Andrew Johns	1993–2007	80	917	22
2	1,228	Kurt Gidley	2001–2015	80	452	4
3	810	Kalyn Ponga	2018–	57	291	0
4	440	Akuila Uate	2008–2016	110	0	0
5	410	Tyrone Roberts	2011–2015	21	163	0
6	403	Robbie O'Davis	1992–2004	78	45	1

Most tries
Rank	Tries	Player	Career
1	110	Akuila Uate	2008–2016
2	93	Timana Tahu	1999–2004, 2012–2014
3	87	Adam MacDougall	1997–2003, 2007–2011
=4	80	Andrew Johns	1993–2007
=4	80	Kurt Gidley	2001–2015
5	78	Robbie O'Davis	1992–2004
6	72	James McManus	2007–2015
7	68	Matt Gidley	1996–2006
8	67	Dominic Young	2021-2023, 2025-2026
9	66	Mark Hughes	1997–2005
10	65	Darren Albert	1996–2001

=== Season ===
Most points
Rank	Points	Player	Season	Tries	Goals	F/G
1	279	Andrew Johns	2001	14	110	3
2	246	Andrew Johns	2002	10	102	2
3	207	Andrew Johns	2006	9	85	1
4	200	Andrew Johns	2000	8	84	0
5	194	Andrew Johns	1995	6	85	0

==== Most tries in a single season ====
Rank	Player	Season	Tries
1	Dom Young	2023	25
2	Greg Marzhew	2023	22
3	Timana Tahu	2002	21
=4	Timana Tahu	2000	20
=4	Akuila Uate	2011	20

=== Match ===
==== Most points in a match ====
Rank	Player	Tries	Goals	F/G	Points	Opponent	Venue	Date	Result
1	Andrew Johns	4	9	-	34	Canberra Raiders	Marathon Stadium	29 July 2001	Newcastle won 54-26
2	Andrew Johns	2	11	-	30	Canberra Raiders	Canberra Stadium	19 March 2006	Newcastle won 70-32
3	Andrew Johns	3	8	1	29	New Zealand Warriors	Marathon Stadium	31 March 2001	Newcastle won 45-24
=4	Andrew Johns	2	8	-	24	South Sydney Rabbitohs	Marathon Stadium	8 August 1999	Newcastle won 60-0
=4	Andrew Johns	1	10	-	24	North Queensland Cowboys	Dairy Farmers Stadium	9 August 2003	Newcastle won 60-24
=4	Kalyn Ponga	2	8	-	24	St. George Illawarra Dragons	Glen Willow Stadium	19 May 2019	Newcastle won 45-12

==== Most tries in a match ====
Tries	Player	Opponent	Venue	Date	Result
5	Greg Marzhew	St George Illawarra Dragons	WIN Stadium	9 May 2026	Newcastle won 44-10
5	Edrick Lee	Gold Coast Titans	McDonald Jones Stadium	1 July 2022	Newcastle won 38-12
4	Darren Albert	Wests Tigers	Marathon Stadium	20 February 2000	Newcastle won 46-8
4	Adam MacDougall	New Zealand Warriors	Ericsson Stadium	22 July 2001	Newcastle won 37-30
4	Andrew Johns	Canberra Raiders	Marathon Stadium	29 July 2001	Newcastle won 54-26
4	Cooper Vuna	Brisbane Broncos	EnergyAustralia Stadium	20 August 2010	Newcastle won 44-18
4	Akuila Uate	South Sydney Rabbitohs	Ausgrid Stadium	2 September 2011	Newcastle won 40-24
4	James McManus	Gold Coast Titans	Hunter Stadium	30 June 2013	Newcastle won 46-16
4	Fletcher Sharpe	Wests Tigers	McDonald Jones Stadium	11 August 2024	Newcastle won 34-18

==== Most goals in a match ====
Goals	Player	Opponent	Venue	Date	Result
11	Andrew Johns	Canberra Raiders	Canberra Stadium	11 March 2006	Newcastle won 70-32
11	Kalyn Ponga	Canterbury-Bankstown Bulldogs	Accor Stadium	2 July 2023	Newcastle won 66-0
10	Andrew Johns	North Queensland Cowboys	Dairy Farmers Stadium	8 August 2003	Newcastle won 60-24
9	Andrew Johns	Western Reds	Marathon Stadium	19 March 1995	Newcastle won 54-14
9	Andrew Johns	Canberra Raiders	Marathon Stadium	29 July 2001	Newcastle won 54-26
9	Andrew Johns	Canterbury-Bankstown Bulldogs	EnergyAustralia Stadium	24 March 2006	Newcastle won 46-22
9	Andrew Johns	St. George Illawarra Dragons	WIN Stadium	8 April 2006	Newcastle won 54-6

=== Player of the year (Danny Buderus Medal) ===
Year	Player
2026	Phoenix Crossland
2025	Jacob Saifiti
2024	Dane Gagai
2023	Kalyn Ponga
2022	Tyson Frizell
2021	Jacob Saifiti
2020	Kalyn Ponga
2019	Mitch Barnett
2018	Kalyn Ponga
2017	Mitch Barnett
2016	Dane Gagai
2015	Kurt Gidley

== Club records ==
=== All-time wins & losses record ===
Note: 28 of the 800 games were in the finals (13 wins, 15 losses).

Games	Wins	Draws	Losses
800	376	17	407

Last updated on 5 October 2020. Stats accurate by the end of the 2020 NRL season.

=== Biggest wins ===
Margin	Score	Opponent	Venue	Round	Date
66	66-0	Canterbury Bankstown Bulldogs	Accor Stadium	Round 18	2 July 2023
60	60-0	South Sydney Rabbitohs	Marathon Stadium	Round 23	8 August 1999
50	56-6	Wests Tigers	Marathon Stadium	Round 10	22 April 2001
48	54-6	St. George Illawarra Dragons	WIN Stadium	Round 5	8 April 2006
48	54-6	Parramatta Eels	Hunter Stadium	Round 26	8 September 2013
46	52-6	Canberra Raiders	EnergyAustralia Stadium	Round 4	7 April 2002
44	50-6	Gold Coast Seagulls	Marathon Stadium	Round 21	22 August 1993
44	44-0	South Queensland Crushers	Marathon Stadium	Round 3	23 March 1997
44	44-0	Brisbane Broncos	Marathon Stadium	Round 18	6 July 2001
44	52-8	Cronulla-Sutherland Sharks	EnergyAustralia Stadium	Round 6	19 April 2002
44	56-12	Manly-Warringah Sea Eagles	EnergyAustralia Stadium	Round 16	27 June 2004

=== Highest scores ===
Points	Score	Opponent	Venue	Round	Date
70	70-32	Canberra Raiders	Canberra Stadium	Round 2	19 March 2006
66	66-0	Canterbury Bankstown Bulldogs	Accor Stadium	Round 18	2 July 2023
60	60-0	South Sydney Rabbitohs	Marathon Stadium	Round 23	8 August 1999
60	60-18	Penrith Panthers	Marathon Stadium	Round 26	1 September 2001
60	60-24	North Queensland Cowboys	Dairy Farmers Stadium	Round 22	9 August 2003
56	56-6	Wests Tigers	Marathon Stadium	Round 10	22 April 2001
56	56-12	Manly-Warringah Sea Eagles	EnergyAustralia Stadium	Round 16	27 June 2004

=== Biggest losses ===
Margin	Score	Opponent	Venue	Round	Date
65	6-71	Brisbane Broncos	Suncorp Stadium	Round 11	27 May 2007
62	0-62	Cronulla-Sutherland Sharks	Hunter Stadium	Round 10	15 May 2016
56	10-66	Parramatta Eels	Commbank Stadium	Round 27	7 September 2025
53	0-53	Brisbane Broncos	Suncorp Stadium	Round 7	16 April 2016
50	14-64	Cronulla-Sutherland Sharks	Toyota Park	Round 22	11 August 2002
50	0-50	Parramatta Eels	EnergyAustralia Stadium	Round 14	11 June 2005
46	2-48	St. George Illawarra Dragons	WIN Stadium	Round 4	4 April 2004
46	6-52	Canterbury Bankstown Bulldogs	Telstra Stadium	Round 25	27 August 2004
46	6-52	Melbourne Storm	Olympic Park	Round 7	22 April 2006
46	6-52	South Sydney Rabbitohs	ANZ Stadium	Round 20	25 July 2015

=== Highest scores conceded ===
Points	Score	Opponent	Venue	Round	Date
71	6-71	Brisbane Broncos	Suncorp Stadium	Round 11	27 May 2007
64	14-64	Cronulla-Sutherland Sharks	Toyota Park	Round 22	11 August 2002
62	0-62	Cronulla-Sutherland Sharks	Hunter Stadium	Round 10	15 May 2016
66	10-66	Parramatta Eels	Commbank Stadium	Round 27	7 September 2025
53	0-53	Brisbane Broncos	Suncorp Stadium	Round 7	16 April 2016

=== Streaks ===
Longest winning streaks:

- 11 (25 August 2001 to 19 April 2002)
- 10 (2 July 2023 to 10 September 2023)
- 9 (11 March 1995 to 7 May 1995)
- 8 (9 June 1990 to 29 July 1990)
- 8 (25 March 2001 to 19 May 2001)

Longest home win streaks:

- 9 (27 July 2008 to 31 May 2009)
- 8 (19 March 1995 to 9 July 1995)

Longest losing streaks:

- 19 (16 April 2016 to 5 March 2017)
- 13 (13 March 2005 to 19 June 2005)
- 8 (21 May 2017 to 21 July 2017)
- 7 (16 June 1991 to 28 July 1991)
- 7 (17 July 1994 to 26 August 1994)
- 7 (16 July 2007 to August 24, 2007)
- 7 (18 April 2014 to 24 June 2014)
- 7 (18 March 2017 to 29 April 2017)

=== Comebacks ===
Biggest comeback Trailed an 18-point deficit.

- Trailed Parramatta Eels 18-0 after 18 minutes to win 28-20 at SFS (7 September 1997)
- Trailed Brisbane Broncos 22-4 after 44 minutes to win 26-22 at Marathon Stadium (4 June 2000)
- Trailed Cronulla Sharks 18-0 after 38 minutes to win 31-18 at Remondis Stadium (13 July 2014)

Worst collapse Surrendered a 24-point lead.

- Led Wests Tigers 24-0 after 26 minutes to lose 36-32 at Campbelltown Stadium (11 August 2001)

== Home crowds 1988–2022 ==
Year	Total	Average	Year	Total	Average	Year	Total	Average	Year	Total	Average
1988	226,786	20,617	1998	270,000	20,769	2008	224,996	18,750	2018	227,642	18,974
1989	233,587	21,235	1999	250,563	20,880	2009	190,580	15,882	2019	228,630	19,053
1990	242,200	22,018	2000	264,070	18,862	2010	177,500	14,792	2020	32,301	5,384*
1991	206,261	18,751	2001	250,336	17,881	2011	230,228	19,186	2021	158,723	17,635*
1992	213,204	19,382	2002	243,275	18,713	2012	251,024	20,919	2022	202,683	16,890
1993	162,628	14,784	2003	219,552	18,296	2013	226,032	18,836	2023	285,296	21,945
1994	221,934	20,176	2004	207,105	17,259	2014	211,392	17,616			
1995	233,238	21,203	2005	221,628	18,469	2015	190,691	15,891			
1996	174,750	17,475	2006	285,831	21,987	2016	173,484	14,457			
1997	156,284	14,257	2007	190,563	15,880	2017	187,433	15,619			

1996: 10 home games played due to Cronulla's forfeit in Round 1 during the Super League strike

1998: 26,482 at home final vs. Sydney City

2000: 20,597 at home final vs. Melbourne

2001: 22,061 at home final vs. Sydney Roosters

2002: 21,051 at home final vs. St. George Illawarra

2006: 23,752 at home final vs. Manly

2020: Due to the COVID-19 crisis, not all home crowd figures were available for corresponding season.

2021: Due to the COVID-19 crisis in NSW, only nine games were played at McDonald Jones Stadium as the competition was moved to Queensland.
