= List of Newcastle Knights representatives =

This list includes Newcastle Knights players who have represented while at the club.

== International ==
=== Australia ===
- (Australia) Mark Sargent (1990, 1992)
- (Australia) Brad Godden (1992)
- (Australia) Paul Harragon (1992–95, 1998)
- (Australia) Jamie Ainscough (1995)
- (Australia) Andrew Johns (1995, 1998–03, 2005–06)
- (Australia) Matthew Johns (1995, 1999)
- (Australia) Adam Muir (1995)
- (Australia) Robbie O'Davis (1995, 1998)
- (Australia) Matthew Gidley (1999–02, 2004)
- (Australia) Ben Kennedy (2000–02, 2004)
- (Australia) Adam MacDougall (2000–01)
- (Australia) Danny Buderus (2001–06)
- (Australia) Steve Simpson (2002–03, 2006–07)
- (Australia) Timana Tahu (2002, 2004)
- (Australia) Kurt Gidley (2007–10, 2013)
- (Australia) Akuila Uate (2011–12)
- (Australia) Darius Boyd (2012–14)
- (Australia) Beau Scott (2014)
- (Australia) Sione Mata'utia (2014)
- (Australia) Dane Gagai (2017)

=== Cook Islands ===
- (Cook Islands) Jason Temu (2000)
- (Cook Islands) Johnathon Ford (2009)
- (Cook Islands) Keith Lulia (2009–11)
- (Cook Islands) Zane Tetevano (2009, 2011, 2013)
- (Cook Islands) Zeb Taia (2010–11)
- (Cook Islands) Sam Mataora (2015)

=== England ===
- (England) Chris Joynt (1995)
- (England) Dom Young (2022, 2025)
- (England) Kai Pearce-Paul (2024–25)

=== Fiji ===
- (Fiji) Wes Naiqama (2008–10)
- (Fiji) Akuila Uate (2008–09, 2013)
- (Fiji) Kevin Naiqama (2009–10, 2013)
- (Fiji) Korbin Sims (2013–15)
- (Fiji) Daniel Saifiti (2015)
- (Fiji) Jacob Saifiti (2015)

=== Great Britain ===
- (United Kingdom) Brian Carney (2006)

=== Italy ===
- (Italy) Cameron Ciraldo (2009, 2011)
- (Italy) Josh Mantellato (2013)
- (Italy) Kade Snowden (2013)
- (Italy) Jack Johns (2017)

=== Lebanon ===
- (Lebanon) George Ndaira (2009)
- (Lebanon) James Elias (2014–15)

=== New Zealand ===
- (New Zealand) Adrian Shelford (1988)
- (New Zealand) Sam Stewart (1988–89)
- (New Zealand) James Goulding (1989)
- (New Zealand) Tony Kemp (1989–93)
- (New Zealand) Junior Sa'u (2009–10)
- (New Zealand) Zeb Taia (2010)
- (New Zealand) Danny Levi (2017)
- (New Zealand) Herman Ese’ese (2018)
- (New Zealand) Fa'amanu Brown (2023)
- (New Zealand) Leo Thompson (2023–24)
- (New Zealand) Phoenix Crossland (2024–25)

=== Papua New Guinea ===
- (Papua New Guinea) Neville Costigan (2013)

=== Rest of the World ===
- (New Zealand) Adrian Shelford (1988)
- (New Zealand) Sam Stewart (1988)
- (England) Lee Jackson (1997)

=== Samoa ===
- (Samoa) George Carmont (2006–07)
- (Samoa) Peter Mata'utia (2009, 17)
- (Samoa) Mark Taufua (2009–10)
- (Samoa) Constantine Mika (2010)
- (Samoa) David Fa'alogo (2013–14)
- (Samoa) Joseph Leilua (2013–15)
- (Samoa) Pat Mata'utia (2015)
- (Samoa) Carlos Tuimavave (2015)
- (Samoa) Sione Mata'utia (2017)
- (Samoa) Mason Lino (2019)
- (Samoa) Hymel Hunt (2019)
- (Samoa) Herman Ese'ese (2019)
- (Samoa) James Gavet (2019)
- (Samoa) Danny Levi (2019)
- (Samoa) Greg Marzhew (2023)

=== Tonga ===
- (Tonga) Richard Fa'aoso (2008–11)
- (Tonga) Cooper Vuna (2008)
- (Tonga) Sione Tovo (2009)
- (Tonga) Alai Taufa'ao (2010)
- (Tonga) Siuatonga Likiliki (2013)
- (Tonga) Tyson Frizell (2023)

== State of Origin ==
=== New South Wales ===
- (New South Wales) Mark Sargent (1990)
- (New South Wales) Paul Harragon (1992–98)
- (New South Wales) Robbie McCormack (1992–93)
- (New South Wales) Andrew Johns (1995–00, 2002–03, 2005)
- (New South Wales) Matthew Johns (1995, 1998)
- (New South Wales) Adam Muir (1995–97)
- (New South Wales) Jamie Ainscough (1996)
- (New South Wales) Tony Butterfield (1998)
- (New South Wales) Adam MacDougall (1998–01)
- (New South Wales) Darren Albert (1999)
- (New South Wales) Matthew Gidley (2000–04)
- (New South Wales) Ben Kennedy (2000–05)
- (New South Wales) Mark Hughes (2001)
- (New South Wales) Danny Buderus (2002–08)
- (New South Wales) Steve Simpson (2002, 2005–08)
- (New South Wales) Timana Tahu (2002–04)
- (New South Wales) Josh Perry (2003)
- (New South Wales) Kurt Gidley (2007–11)
- (New South Wales) Jarrod Mullen (2007)
- (New South Wales) Ben Cross (2008)
- (New South Wales) James McManus (2009, 2013–14)
- (New South Wales) Akuila Uate (2011–12)
- (New South Wales) Beau Scott (2014–15)
- (New South Wales) David Klemmer (2019)
- (New South Wales) Daniel Saifiti (2019–21)
- (New South Wales) Mitchell Pearce (2019)
- (New South Wales) Jacob Saifiti (2022–23)
- (New South Wales) Tyson Frizell (2023)
- (New South Wales) Bradman Best (2023–24)
- (New South Wales) Dylan Lucas (2026)

=== Queensland ===
- (Queensland) Michael Hagan (1989–90)
- (Queensland) Mike McLean (1991)
- (Queensland) Adrian Brunker (1992–93)
- (Queensland) Robbie O'Davis (1995–99, 2002)
- (Queensland) Darius Boyd (2012–14)
- (Queensland) Dane Gagai (2015–17, 2022, 24)
- (Queensland) Kalyn Ponga (2018–19, 2021–22, 24–26)
- (Queensland) Tim Glasby (2019)
- (Queensland) Edrick Lee (2020)

== City vs Country Origin ==
=== New South Wales City ===
- (New South Wales) Jamie Ainscough (1995–96)
- (New South Wales) Adam Cuthbertson (2013)
- (New South Wales) Nathan Ross (2017)

=== New South Wales Country ===
- (New South Wales) Tony Butterfield (1989)
- (New South Wales) Mark Sargent (1989, 1992, 1994)
- (New South Wales) Gary Wurth (1989)
- (New South Wales) John Allanson (1990)
- (New South Wales) Scott Carter (1990)
- (New South Wales) Marc Glanville (1991, 1994, 1997)
- (New South Wales) Ashley Gordon (1991, 1995)
- (New South Wales) Paul Harragon (1992–97)
- (New South Wales) Robbie McCormack (1992–94)
- (New South Wales) Adam Muir (1995–96)
- (New South Wales) Darren Treacy (1995)
- (New South Wales) Wayne Richards (1997)
- (New South Wales) Darren Albert (2001)
- (New South Wales) Danny Buderus (2001, 2003, 2005, 2007–08)
- (New South Wales) Josh Perry (2001–04)
- (New South Wales) Steve Simpson (2001–02, 2005)
- (New South Wales) Timana Tahu (2001–03)
- (New South Wales) Mark Hughes (2002)
- (New South Wales) John Morris (2002)
- (New South Wales) Matt Parsons (2002)
- (New South Wales) Daniel Abraham (2003–04)
- (New South Wales) Ben Kennedy (2003)
- (New South Wales) Andrew Johns (2003)
- (New South Wales) Kurt Gidley (2004, 2006–07)
- (New South Wales) Matthew Gidley (2005)
- (New South Wales) Anthony Quinn (2006)
- (New South Wales) Clint Newton (2007)
- (New South Wales) Ben Cross (2008)
- (New South Wales) James McManus (2009, 2012–15)
- (New South Wales) Jarrod Mullen (2009, 2011–12, 2014)
- (New South Wales) Chris Houston (2011)
- (New South Wales) Akuila Uate (2011, 2013, 2015)
- (New South Wales) Willie Mason (2013)
- (New South Wales) Alex McKinnon (2013)
- (New South Wales) Tyrone Roberts (2014)
- (New South Wales) Robbie Rochow (2014)
- (New South Wales) Beau Scott (2014)
- (New South Wales) Tariq Sims (2015)
- (New South Wales) Kade Snowden (2015)

== All Stars Match ==
=== Indigenous All Stars ===
- Cory Paterson (2010–11)
- Timana Tahu (2013)
- Travis Waddell (2013)
- Dane Gagai (2015–16)
- Tyrone Roberts (2015)

=== NRL All Stars/World All Stars ===
- (Australia) Kurt Gidley (2010–11)
- (Australia) Akuila Uate (2011, 2013)
- (Australia) Kade Snowden (2012)
- (Australia) Willie Mason (2013)
- (Australia) Beau Scott (2015)
- (New Zealand) Jeremy Smith (2015–16)

== Other honours ==
=== New Zealand Māori ===
- (Māori people) Paul Rauhihi (2000)

=== Prime Minister's XIII ===
- (Australia) Kurt Gidley (2005–07)
- (Australia) Clint Newton (2005)
- (Australia) Jarrod Mullen (2006)
- (Australia) Adam Woolnough (2006)
- (Australia) Ben Cross (2008)
- (Australia) Cory Paterson (2008)
- (Australia) Akuila Uate (2010, 2012)
- (Australia) Darius Boyd (2012)
- (Australia) Sione Mata'utia (2014)
- (Australia) Beau Scott (2014)
- (Australia) Dane Gagai (2015)

== Representative captains ==
=== World Cup captains ===
Australia

- (Australia) Paul Harragon (1995)

Cook Islands

- (Cook Islands) Jason Temu (vice-captain - 2000)

Fiji

- (Fiji) Wes Naiqama (2008)

Papua New Guinea

- (Papua New Guinea) Neville Costigan (2013)

=== Test captains ===
Australia

- (Australia) Paul Harragon (1995)
- (Australia) Andrew Johns (2002–03)
- (Australia) Danny Buderus (2004–05)

Samoa

- (Samoa) George Carmont (2006–07)
- (Samoa) David Fa'alogo (2014)

=== State of Origin captains ===
New South Wales

- (New South Wales) Andrew Johns (2002–03)
- (New South Wales) Danny Buderus (2004–08)
- (New South Wales) Kurt Gidley (2009–11)

=== City vs Country Origin captains ===
New South Wales Country

- (New South Wales) Danny Buderus (2007–08)
- (New South Wales) Beau Scott (2014)

=== All Stars captains ===
NRL All Stars

- (Australia) Beau Scott (2015)

== Representative coaching staff ==
=== International ===
Fiji

- (Fiji) Rick Stone (coach - 2013–15)

Tonga

- (Australia) Rohan Smith (coach - 2009)

=== State of Origin ===
Queensland

- (Queensland) Michael Hagan (coach - 2004–05)

=== All Stars Match ===
NRL All Stars

- (Australia) Wayne Bennett (coach - 2012–13)
