= Blue tongue =

Blue Tongue or bluetongue may refer to:

- Blue-tongued skink, a genus of lizards
- Bluetongue disease, in ruminants
  - Bluetongue virus, cause of the disease
- Blue Tongue Entertainment - an Australian video game developer
- Blue Tongue bush or Straits Rhododendron, Melastoma polyanthum
- Bluetongue Brewery, a defunct Australian brewery
- Blue-Tongue Films, an Australian film collective/production company
