= 1997 ARL season =

Rugby league competition

1997 Australian Rugby League
- Duration: 7 March – 28 September 1997
- Teams: 12
- Premiers: Newcastle (1st title)
- Minor premiers: Manly (9th title)
- Matches played: 141
- Points scored: 5,370
- Average attendance: 10,610
- Total attendance: 1,496,040
- Top points scorer: Jason Taylor (242)
- Player of the year: Brad Fittler (Provan-Summons Medal)
- Wooden spoon: South Qld Crushers (2nd spoon)
- Top try-scorer: Terry Hill (22)

The 1997 Australian Rugby League season was the 90th season of professional rugby league football in Australia, and the third season run by the Australian Rugby League. While several clubs had left the League to compete in the 1997 Super League season, twelve ARL-loyal teams – eight from across Sydney, two from greater New South Wales and two from Queensland (Gold Coast and South Queensland) – competed for the Optus Cup Trophy. The top seven teams then played a series of knock-out finals which culminated in a September grand final played in Sydney between the Manly Warringah Sea Eagles and the Newcastle Knights. Newcastle won its first ever premiership, staging a comeback from 8–16 behind to defeat Manly 22–16.

== Preseason ==
The season is most notable for being run parallel to the rival Super League competition. This was the only season when the two competitions actually ran, notwithstanding that 1995 and 1996 had been disrupted by the Super League war.

ARL chairman Ken Arthurson resigned in February 1997 in an effort to enable re-unification negotiations held during the season to succeed. It would not be until after the season's end in December that the boards of every ARL club would gather at the SCG in an unprecedented meeting to consider the proposed peace deal following five months of secret negotiations between Ian Frykberg and Neil Whittaker.

== Regular season ==
In 1997 the official player of the year award, the Provan-Summons Medal was won by Brad Fittler. This award was replaced by the Dally M Medal from the following year. The Illawarra Steelers' Scott Cram was named the 1997 season's rookie of the year.

The grand finals (winners in bold):

- ARL Optus Cup: Manly Warringah Sea Eagles vs **Newcastle Knights**
- Reserve grade: Balmain Tigers vs **Parramatta Eels**
- Under-20s: **Balmain Tigers** vs Sydney City Roosters

The ARL organised one test match with Australia defeating Rest Of The World squad 28–8 at Suncorp Stadium in July.
The 1997 State of Origin series was won by New South Wales two games to one after the Blues won the opening two matches of series.

In the annual City vs Country Origin match, Country won 17–4 at Marathon Stadium in April. The first time Country has won back-to-back matches in 35 years.

=== ARL Teams ===
The eight ARL teams that had aligned themselves with Super League were absent from this year's ARL premiership, instead spending the year competing in the new Telstra Cup competition. The Balmain Tigers changed their name back from the Sydney Tigers this season.

=== Teams ===
Team	Nickname	Colours	Jersey	Season	Home Ground	Coach	Captain
Balmain	Tigers			73rd season	Parramatta Stadium	Wayne Pearce	Paul Sironen
Gold Coast	Chargers			10th season	Seagulls Stadium	Phil Economidis	Dave Watson
Illawarra	Steelers			16th season	Wollongong Stadium	Allan McMahon	John Cross → Paul McGregor
Manly	Sea Eagles			50th season	Brookvale Oval	Bob Fulton	Geoff Toovey
Newcastle	Knights			10th season	Marathon Stadium	Malcolm "Mal" Reilly	Paul Harragon
North Sydney	Bears			73rd season	North Sydney Oval	Peter Louis	Jason Taylor
Parramatta	Eels			50th season	Parramatta Stadium	Ron Hilditch	Gary Freeman → Jarrod McCracken
St. George	Dragons			60th season	Kogarah Oval	David Waite	Mark Coyne
South Queensland	Crushers			3rd & Final season	Lang Park	Bob Lindner	Trevor Gillmeister
South Sydney	Rabbitohs			73rd season	Sydney Football Stadium	Ken Shine	Craig Field → Craig Salvatori
Sydney City (East. Subs.)	Roosters			73rd season	Sydney Football Stadium	Phil Gould	Sean Garlick
West. Subs.	Magpies			73rd season	Lidcombe Oval	Roy Masters	Tom Raudonikis

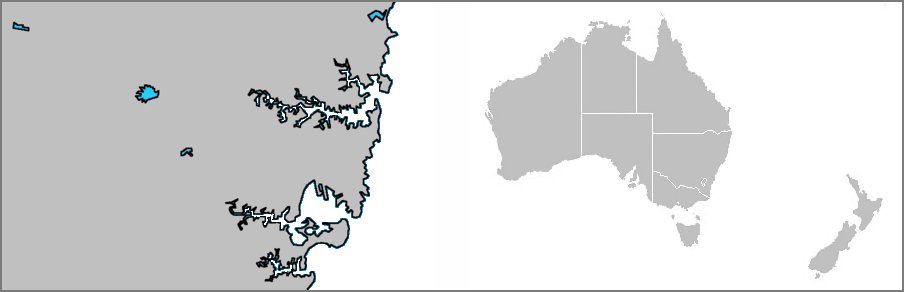
Locations of the participating clubs

=== Ladder ===
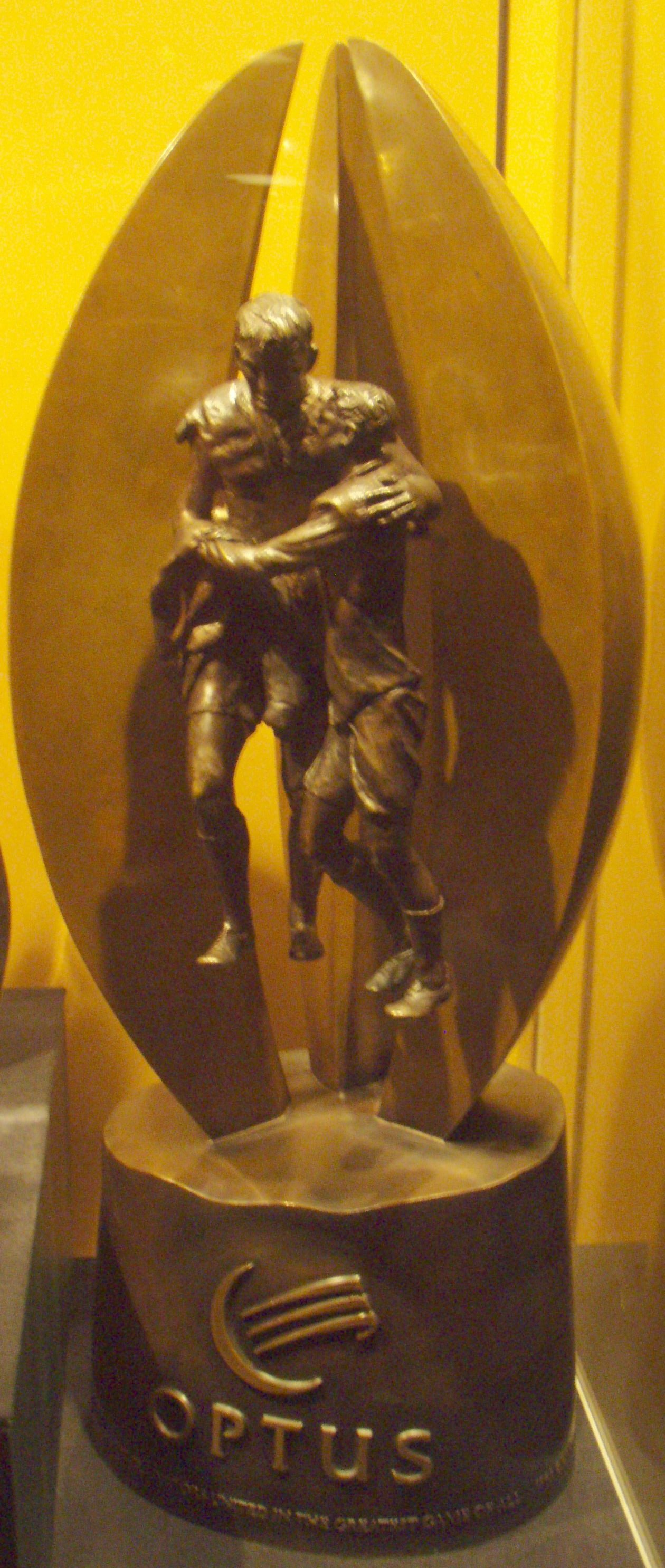
The Optus Cup trophy

Pos	Team	Pld	W	D	L	PF	PA	PD	Pts	Qualification
1	Manly Warringah Sea Eagles	22	15	2	5	521	366	+155	32	Advance to finals series
2	Newcastle Knights (P)	22	14	1	7	512	320	+192	29	Advance to finals series
3	Parramatta Eels	22	14	1	7	431	359	+72	29	Advance to finals series
4	North Sydney Bears	22	13	1	8	529	341	+188	27	Advance to finals series
5	Sydney City Roosters	22	13	1	8	487	366	+121	27	Advance to finals series
6	Illawarra Steelers	22	10	3	9	423	376	+47	23	Advance to finals series
7	Gold Coast Chargers	22	10	1	11	438	466	−28	21	Advance to finals series
8	Balmain Tigers	22	10	0	12	339	340	−1	20	
9	Western Suburbs Magpies	22	10	0	12	355	424	−69	20	
10	St. George Dragons	22	9	1	12	331	392	−61	19	
11	South Sydney Rabbitohs	22	4	1	17	323	630	−307	9	
12	South Queensland Crushers	22	4	0	18	321	630	−309	8	

Source: RLP
(P) Premiers

==== Ladder progression ====
- Numbers highlighted in green indicate that the team finished the round inside the top 7.
- Numbers highlighted in blue indicates the team finished first on the ladder in that round.
- Numbers highlighted in red indicates the team finished in last place on the ladder in that round

	Team	1	2	3	4	5	6	7	8	9	10	11	12	13	14	15	16	17	18	19	20	21	22
1	Manly	2	4	6	8	10	12	14	14	15	16	18	18	20	20	22	24	24	26	28	30	30	32
2	**Newcastle**	2	2	4	6	8	10	10	12	12	12^{1}	14	14	14	16	17	19	21	21	23	25	27	29
3	Parramatta	2	2	2	2	2	2	4	6	8	10	12	14	16	18	20	22	24	24	26	28	28	29
4	North Sydney	0	2	2	3	5	7	7	9	11	13	15	15	17	19	19	21	23	25	25	25	27	27
5	Sydney City	2	4	6	6	6	6	8	10	12	14	14	14	14	14	15	15	17	19	21	23	25	27
6	Illawarra	2	4	4	5	7	9	9	9	10	10	10	11	11	13	15	17	17	19	19	19	21	23
7	Gold Coast	2	2	4	4	4	6	6	6	8	9	11	11	13	15	17	17	19	19	19	19	21	21
8	Balmain	0	0	0	2	4	4	6	8	8	8	8	10	12	12	14	14	16	16	18	18	20	20
9	Western Suburbs	0	0	0	2	2	2	4	6	6	8	10	12	14	14	14	16	16	16	18	20	20	20
10	St. George	0	0	2	4	6	8	8	8	10	10	10	12	12	12	12	14	14	14	16	18	18	19
11	South Sydney	0	2	4	4	4	4	6	6	6	6^{1}	6	7	7	9	9	9	9	9	9	9	9	9
12	South Qld	0	2	2	2	2	2	2	2	2	2	2	4	4	4	4	4	4	6	6	6	6	8

^{1} The round 10 match between Newcastle Knights and South Sydney Rabbitohs was postponed due to rain. This match was played during round 16.

== Finals ==
Sydney City and North Sydney played out a bizarre qualifying final with the Roosters winning 33–21. The Roosters fought back from 14–2 down with 10 minutes to go to get it back to 14–14, then both sides kicked a field goal to send it to extra time at 15–15. The Roosters went on to play Gold Coast, who were in their first-ever finals campaign (and had experienced their first finals win against Illawarra), with the Roosters winning 32–10 to book a preliminary final showdown with Manly. A peculiarity of the finals system saw Manly and Newcastle face off in what was later realised to be a pointless game where both the winner and loser would progress to a Grand Final qualifier the following week. The Roosters mounted another fightback when they came from 16–6 down to get it back to 16–16, but it was a Sea Eagles field goal that proved the difference to book themselves a third straight Grand Final berth with a 17–16 win.

Newcastle reached the 1997 Grand Final after defeating Parramatta in week one of the finals series. At one stage, Parramatta led the match 18–0 before a comeback gave Newcastle a 28–20 victory. Newcastle then lost the following week to Manly 27–12 before setting up a preliminary final clash with North Sydney.

With the score 12–8 in favour of Newcastle with under 10 minutes to play, Jason Taylor set up Michael Buettner for a try which made the score 12–12. Normally a very reliable kicker and one of the most accurate in the competition, Taylor had already missed two previous conversions in the match, However, if he were to successfully convert this try, it could send North Sydney through to their first Grand Final since 1943, and vie for their first premiership since 1922. Taylor ended up missing the goal. With the scores remaining locked at 12–12, Newcastle player Matthew Johns kicked a field goal with two minutes to play to make it 13–12. With only seconds remaining, North Sydney frantically threw the ball around and lost it; the ball was swooped upon by Newcastle's Owen Craigie and he raced away to score a match-sealing try.

Home	Score	Away	Match Information
Home	Score	Away	Date and Time	Venue	Referee	Crowd
Qualifying Finals
Illawarra Steelers	14–25	Gold Coast Chargers	5 September 1997	Parramatta Stadium	David Manson	8,197
North Sydney Bears	21–33	Sydney City Roosters	6 September 1997	Sydney Football Stadium	Kelvin Jeffes	11,332
Newcastle Knights	28–20	Parramatta Eels	7 September 1997	Sydney Football Stadium	Paul McBlane	17,849
Semi Finals
Sydney City Roosters	32–10	Gold Coast Chargers	12 September 1997	Parramatta Stadium	Paul McBlane	10,466
Parramatta Eels	14–24	North Sydney Bears	13 September 1997	Sydney Football Stadium	David Manson	17,025
Manly Warringah Sea Eagles	27–12	Newcastle Knights	14 September 1997	Sydney Football Stadium	Kelvin Jeffes	26,531
Preliminary Finals
Newcastle Knights	17–12	North Sydney Bears	20 September 1997	Sydney Football Stadium	Kelvin Jeffes	22,540
Manly Warringah Sea Eagles	17–16	Sydney City Roosters	21 September 1997	Sydney Football Stadium	David Manson	30,794
Grand Final
Manly Warringah Sea Eagles	16–22	Newcastle Knights	28 September 1997	Sydney Football Stadium	David Manson	42,482

=== Chart ===
Qualifying Finals
7 Sept, Sydney Football Stadium
2	Newcastle Knights	28
3	Parramatta Eels	20
6 Sept, Sydney Football Stadium
4	North Sydney Bears	21
5	Sydney City Roosters	33
5 Sept, Parramatta Stadium
6	Illawarra Steelers	14
7	Gold Coast Chargers	25

Major Semi Final
14 Sept, Sydney Football Stadium
1	Manly Warringah Sea Eagles	27
Newcastle Knights	12
Minor Semi Finals
13 Sept, Sydney Football Stadium
Parramatta Eels	14
North Sydney Bears	24
12 Sept, Parramatta Stadium
Sydney City Roosters	32
Gold Coast Chargers	10

Preliminary Finals
20 Sept, Sydney Football Stadium
Newcastle Knights	17
North Sydney Bears	12
21 Sept, Sydney Football Stadium
Manly Warringah Sea Eagles	17
Sydney City Roosters	16

Grand Final
28 Sept, Sydney Football Stadium
Manly Warringah Sea Eagles	16
Newcastle Knights	22

== Grand Final ==
1997 ARL Grand Final

Manly Sea Eagles	Newcastle Knights
16	22
	1	2	Total
MAN	16	0	16
NEW	8	14	22
- Date: 28 September 1997
- Stadium: Sydney Football Stadium
- Location: Sydney
- Clive Churchill Medal: Robbie O'Davis (NEW)
- Australian National anthem: Julie Anthony
- Referee: David Manson
- Attendance: 42,482

Broadcast partners
- Broadcasters: Nine Network
- Commentators: Ken Sutcliffe (host); Ray Warren; Peter Sterling; Paul Vautin; Steve Roach & Gary Belcher (sideline)

=== Teams ===
Team details
Manly Warringah Sea Eagles		Position	Newcastle Knights
Name	Number	Position	Number	Name
Shannon Nevin	1	Fullback	1	Robbie O'Davis
Danny Moore	2	Wing	2	Darren Albert
Craig Innes	3	Centre	3	Adam MacDougall
Terry Hill	4	Centre	4	Owen Craigie
John Hopoate	5	Wing	5	Mark Hughes
Geoff Toovey (c)	6	Five eighth	6	Matthew Johns
Craig Field	7	Half back	7	Andrew Johns
David Gillespie	17	Prop forward	8	Tony Butterfield
Anthony Colella	15	Hooker	9	Bill Peden
Mark Carroll	10	Prop forward	10	Paul Harragon (c)
Steve Menzies	11	Second row	11	Wayne Richards
Daniel Gartner	12	Second row	12	Adam Muir
Nik Kosef	13	Lock forward	13	Marc Glanville
Cliff Lyons	9	Interchange	15	Troy Fletcher
Neil Tierney	8	Interchange	16	Scott Conley
Scott Fulton	14	Interchange	18	Lee Jackson
Andrew Hunter	16	Interchange	19	Steve Crowe
Bob Fulton		Coach		Mal Reilly

=== Match details ===
The Knights won the premiership over Manly, which was aiming for back-to-back wins. It was the first ever premiership for the Knights, and was won after staging a comeback from 8–16 down at halftime.

1st half

The long-running duel between opposing front rowers Mark Carroll and Paul Harragon erupted once again in the 2nd minute when Carroll reacted to a Harragon shot on Geoff Toovey. Newcastle applied pressure early when they regained possession inside Manly's 20m and shortly after that Andrew Johns took a penalty attempt, but Manly's defence and luck stood firm and the score stayed nil-all. Manly scored first after rookie hooker Anthony Colella won a scrum against the feed. John Hopoate exploited a weakness in Newcastle's right side defence and got between Darren Albert and Mark Hughes to score. Nevin's sideline conversion gave the Sea Eagles a 6–0 lead. In 13th minute Manly suffered a blow when Toovey was steamrolled. He left the field concussed for Cliff Lyons to come on.

Johns went within inches of scoring for Newcastle in the 24th minute when his blindside break on the last tackle was stopped by a desperate Hopoate. Manly responded with a thrilling try in the 25th minute. The movement started 55 metres out – Hopoate making the initial break down the left-hand side with Lyons backing up to enable Craig Innes to crash over for a Manly 10–0 lead. Newcastle's first points came through a Johns' penalty goal. Then in the 34th minute they scored their first ever Grand Final try after a clever kick from Matthew Johns was taken by Hopoate who was bundled into touch. From the scrum win, Robbie O'Davis got outside Terry Hill to score. Andrew Johns' conversion brought Newcastle within two points. Manly hit back in the 38th minute after some magical work from Lyons. He swept onto the ball which had been dropped by Harragon and spun around to find Shannon Nevin on the inside. The Newcastle forwards couldn't get across to cover the overlap and Nevin then converted his own try for a 16–8 half-time scoreline.

2nd half

Early in the second half there was more concern for Toovey after he was stomped on by Adam MacDougall. Manly then almost put Newcastle away in the 51st minute when Steven Menzies powered through close to the line only to be stopped by Troy Fletcher scrambling well to effect a try- and match-saving tackle for the Knights. Andrew Johns booted a penalty goal in the 57th minute to claw Newcastle back to within a converted try. In the 61st minute Adam Muir dropped a pass from Andrew Johns a metre from Manly's line but it was a sign that the Knights were back in the game. Manly on the other hand, began to play conservatively to their own ultimate cost. They received a penalty after another Harragon high tackle and elected to kick at goal 32 metres out with a swirling breeze. Nevin missed and Darren Albert returned the kick with a 40-metre run. Manly applied pressure for the next ten minutes but came away empty handed. Colella and then Nik Kosef both dropped balls inside Newcastle's 30m line while trying to off-load. A 69th minute last tackle raid ten metres out by Manly also fell short when a field-goal might have sealed the game. Having withstood the pressure, Newcastle then lifted. Following a long break by Fletcher, Andrew Johns received the ball from his brother. He stood in a tackle, handed to O'Davis, who spun and planted the ball on the line. Johns' conversion levelled the scores 16–16 with five minutes remaining.

The match is ultimately best remembered for its classic grandstand finish. With 28 seconds remaining and on their last tackle, the Knights attempted a match-winning field goal. A charge-down by a Manly player foiled the field goal attempt but gave the Knights six more tackles. With 19 seconds left, Darren Albert played the ball on the first tackle of the next set of six, with Andrew Johns at dummy-half. At the play of the ball Johns unexpectedly went down the narrow blind-side, throwing a dummy and engaging several Manly players, before slipping a pass back inside to Albert whose try took the score to 20–16 only seven seconds from full-time. The Knights players and their fans broke into celebration at having won their inaugural title, with Ray Warren proclaiming "Newcastle have won the Grand Final!" With the after the siren conversion from Andrew Johns, the final score was 22-16.

Seventy per cent of the winning squad were Newcastle juniors. The win was a huge morale boost to the blue-collar Newcastle district in the same year that the region's biggest employer, the BHP steelworks, had announced its closure.

=== Scoreboard ===
1997 ARL Optus Cup Grand Final

Sunday, 28 September
15:00 AEST (UTC+10)

Manly Warringah Sea Eagles	16 – 22	Newcastle Knights
Tries: 3 Hopoate 9'; Innes 24'; Nevin 37'; Goals: 2 Nevin 10', 39' (2/4)	1st: 16–8; 2nd: 0–14; Report	Tries: 3 O'Davis 33', 73'; Albert 80'; Goals: 5 A Johns pen 29', 35', pen 56', 75', 80' (5/6)

Sydney Football Stadium
Attendance: 42,482
Referee: David Manson
Clive Churchill Medal: Robbie O'Davis (Newcastle)

=== Post game ===
A Super Bowl style match between the Newcastle Knights and Brisbane Broncos, the 1997 Super League season's premiers was mooted, but did not eventuate. Newcastle only had to wait another four years for its next premiership, while Manly had to wait until 2007 for another grand final appearance, which was unsuccessful. Manly's next premiership would come the following year.

== Player statistics ==
The following statistics are as of the conclusion of Round 22.

Top 5 point scorers

Points	Player	Tries	Goals	Field Goals
217	Jason Taylor	9	89	3
158	Ivan Cleary	5	69	0
109	Andrew Leeds	3	47	3
106	Wayne Bartrim	5	43	0
102	Michael Withers	8	35	0

Top 5 try scorers

Tries	Player
20	Terry Hill
17	Darren Albert
14	Wayne Clifford
12	Steve Menzies
12	John Hopoate
12	Andrew Walker
12	William Kennedy

Top 5 goal scorers

Goals	Player
89	Jason Taylor
69	Ivan Cleary
47	Andrew Leeds
43	Wayne Bartrim
37	Brendan Hurst

== Postseason ==
With twenty-two teams playing in two competitions in 1997 crowd attendances and corporate sponsorship were spread very thinly, and many teams found themselves in financial difficulty by the end of the season. Despite having the financial backing of Optus, the Australian Rugby League decided that it was not in the best interests of the game to run two competitions and undertook moves to approach News Limited and invite the traditional clubs back into the main competition. As a consequence of the negotiations that followed, on 23 September 1997 the ARL announced that it was forming a new competition in partnership with News Limited. The NRL was formed from the ARL and Super League competitions.

It was announced that the 1998 season would have 20 teams competing, 19 of the ARL and Super League teams and the Melbourne Storm, who were owned by News Limited. Some of the clubs on both sides of the war were shut down. News decided to close the Hunter Mariners and the financially ruined Western/Perth Reds, who were A$10million in debt at the end of 1997, while the ARL decided to close down the South Queensland Crushers, who were also in financial trouble. Additionally, at the end of the following season News Limited would decide to close down the Adelaide Rams and the ARL would close down the Gold Coast Chargers, even though they were one of the few clubs to make a profit during the Super League war.

== 1997 Transfers ==
=== Players ===
Player	1996 Club	1997 Club
Greg Alexander	Auckland Warriors	Penrith Panthers (Super League)
Richie Blackmore	Auckland Warriors	Super League: Leeds Rhinos
Andy Platt	Auckland Warriors	Super League: Salford Reds
Tony Tatupu	Auckland Warriors	Super League: Warrington Wolves
Alan Cann	Brisbane Broncos	Adelaide Rams (Super League)
Willie Carne	Brisbane Broncos	Retirement
Brett Galea	Brisbane Broncos	Adelaide Rams (Super League)
Chris Johns	Brisbane Broncos	Retirement
Robbie Ross	Brisbane Broncos	Hunter Mariners (Super League)
Kerrod Walters	Brisbane Broncos	Adelaide Rams (Super League)
Mark Corvo	Canberra Raiders	Adelaide Rams (Super League)
Steve Stone	Canberra Raiders	Adelaide Rams (Super League)
Steve Walters	Canberra Raiders	North Queensland Cowboys (Super League)
Scott Hill	Canterbury-Bankstown Bulldogs	Hunter Mariners (Super League)
Terry Lamb	Canterbury-Bankstown Bulldogs	Retirement
Jason Lidden	Canterbury-Bankstown Bulldogs	Super League: Castleford Tigers
Dave Boughton	Cronulla-Sutherland Sharks	Adelaide Rams (Super League)
Gavin Jones	Cronulla-Sutherland Sharks	Retirement
Andrew Pierce	Cronulla-Sutherland Sharks	Adelaide Rams (Super League)
Brett Gillard	Gold Coast Chargers	South Sydney Rabbitohs
Shane Kenward	Gold Coast Chargers	St. George Dragons
Jeff Orford	Gold Coast Chargers	South Sydney Rabbitohs
Dave Watson	Gold Coast Chargers	South Queensland Crushers
Darrien Doherty	Illawarra Steelers	Hunter Mariners (Super League)
Darren Fritz	Illawarra Steelers	North Sydney Bears
Brendan O'Meara	Illawarra Steelers	South Sydney Rabbitohs
Neil Piccinelli	Illawarra Steelers	Hunter Mariners (Super League)
Wayne Richards	Illawarra Steelers	Newcastle Knights
David Riolo	Illawarra Steelers	Parramatta Eels
Craig Simon	Illawarra Steelers	South Sydney Rabbitohs
Josh White	Illawarra Steelers	Super League: London Broncos
Owen Cunningham	Manly Warringah Sea Eagles	North Queensland Cowboys (Super League)
Matt Dunford	Manly Warringah Sea Eagles	Super League: London Broncos
Jack Elsegood	Manly Warringah Sea Eagles	Sydney City Roosters
Des Hasler	Manly Warringah Sea Eagles	Western Suburbs Magpies
Matthew Ridge	Manly Warringah Sea Eagles	Auckland Warriors (Super League)
Jamie Ainscough	Newcastle Knights	St. George Dragons
Keith Beauchamp	Newcastle Knights	Hunter Mariners (Super League)
Brad Godden	Newcastle Knights	Hunter Mariners (Super League)
Paul Marquet	Newcastle Knights	Hunter Mariners (Super League)
Robbie McCormack	Newcastle Knights	Hunter Mariners (Super League)
Darren Treacy	Newcastle Knights	St. George Dragons
David Bouveng	North Queensland Cowboys	Super League: Halifax Blue Sox
Steve Edmed	North Queensland Cowboys	Super League: Sheffield Eagles
Damian Gibson	North Queensland Cowboys	Super League: Leeds Rhinos
Jason Martin	North Queensland Cowboys	Super League: Paris Saint-Germain
Dean Schifilliti	North Queensland Cowboys	Adelaide Rams (Super League)
Wayne Sing	North Queensland Cowboys	Super League: Paris Saint-Germain
Adrian Vowles	North Queensland Cowboys	Super League: Castleford Tigers
Mat Toshack	North Sydney Bears	South Queensland Crushers
Craig Wilson	North Sydney Bears	South Queensland Crushers
Keith Blackett	Parramatta Eels	Gold Coast Chargers
Michael Erickson	Parramatta Eels	Retirement
Gary Freeman	Parramatta Eels	Retirement
Rod Maybon	Parramatta Eels	Adelaide Rams (Super League)
Marty McKenzie	Parramatta Eels	Adelaide Rams (Super League)
Shane Russell	Parramatta Eels	Gold Coast Chargers
John Cartwright	Penrith Panthers	Super League: Salford Reds
Scott Pethybridge	Penrith Panthers	North Sydney Bears
Barry Walker	Penrith Panthers	Retirement
Wayne Collins	South Queensland Crushers	Super League: Leeds Rhinos
Nigel Gaffey	South Queensland Crushers	Sydney City Roosters
Trevor Gillmeister	South Queensland Crushers	Retirement
Tony Hearn	South Queensland Crushers	St. George Dragons
Brett Horsnell	South Queensland Crushers	Parramatta Eels
Graham Mackay	South Queensland Crushers	Gold Coast Chargers
Chris McKenna	South Queensland Crushers	Cronulla-Sutherland Sharks (Super League)
Danny Peacock	South Queensland Crushers	Super League: Bradford Bulls
Dale Shearer	South Queensland Crushers	Sydney City Roosters
Jason Bell	South Sydney Rabbitohs	Parramatta Eels
Craig Field	South Sydney Rabbitohs	Manly Warringah Sea Eagles
Martin Masella	South Sydney Rabbitohs	Super League: Leeds Rhinos
Will Robinson	South Sydney Rabbitohs	Illawarra Steelers
Craig Salvatori	South Sydney Rabbitohs	Retirement
Jacin Sinclair	South Sydney Rabbitohs	Sydney City Roosters
David Barnhill	St. George Dragons	Sydney City Roosters
Kevin Campion	St. George Dragons	Adelaide Rams (Super League)
Jason Donnelly	St. George Dragons	Adelaide Rams (Super League)
Noel Goldthorpe	St. George Dragons	Hunter Mariners (Super League)
Scott Gourley	St. George Dragons	Sydney City Roosters
Anthony Mundine	St. George Dragons	Brisbane Broncos (Super League)
Scott Murray	St. George Dragons	South Sydney Rabbitohs
Chris Quinn	St. George Dragons	Adelaide Rams (Super League)
Jason Stevens	St. George Dragons	Cronulla-Sutherland Sharks (Super League)
Troy Stone	St. George Dragons	Hunter Mariners (Super League)
Ricky Walford	St. George Dragons	Retirement
Nick Zisti	St. George Dragons	Hunter Mariners (Super League)
Greg Bourke	Balmain Tigers	Sydney City Roosters
Anthony Brann	Balmain Tigers	Hunter Mariners (Super League)
Ian Herron	Balmain Tigers	Parramatta Eels
Wes Patten	Balmain Tigers	Gold Coast Chargers
Corey Pearson	Balmain Tigers	St. George Dragons
Dan Stains	Balmain Tigers	Retirement
Paul Dunn	Sydney City Roosters	Retirement
Tony Iro	Sydney City Roosters	Hunter Mariners (Super League)
Tim Maddison	Sydney City Roosters	Hunter Mariners (Super League)
John Simon	Sydney City Roosters	Parramatta Eels
James Smith	Sydney City Roosters	Western Suburbs Magpies
Shane Whereat	Sydney City Roosters	Parramatta Eels
Cameron Blair	Perth Reds	Adelaide Rams (Super League)
David Boyd	Perth Reds	Retirement
Brett Goldspink	Perth Reds	Super League: Oldham Bears
Julian O'Neill	Perth Reds	South Sydney Rabbitohs
Mick Potter	Perth Reds	Retirement
Craig Coleman	Western Suburbs Magpies	Retirement
Justin Dooley	Western Suburbs Magpies	Hunter Mariners (Super League)
Andrew Hick	Western Suburbs Magpies	Adelaide Rams (Super League)
Harvey Howard	Super League: Leeds Rhinos	Western Suburbs Magpies
Kevin Iro	Super League: Leeds Rhinos	Hunter Mariners (Super League)
Leo Dynevor	Super League: London Broncos	Newcastle Knights
Ian Roberts	Hiatus	North Queensland Cowboys (Super League)
Gorden Tallis	Hiatus	Brisbane Broncos (Super League)
Wayne Simonds	N/A	Adelaide Rams (Super League)

=== Coaches ===
Coach	1996 Club	1997 Club
Tim Sheens	Canberra Raiders	North Queensland Cowboys (Super League)
Brian Smith	Super League: Bradford Bulls	Parramatta Eels

== See also ==
- 1997 State of Origin series
