= Bondi Blonde =

Australian beer

- Manufacturer: Bondi Brewing Company
- Introduced: 2006
- Style: Pale Lager

Bondi Blonde was a beer manufactured by Australian brewer Bluetongue, which was based in Cameron Park, New South Wales.

In December 2006, advertising guru John Singleton brought Paris Hilton to Sydney to help select the face of his new Bondi Blonde beer. Hilton awarded the honour to Jamie Wright.

== History ==
Bondi Blonde was the creation of Dean Brunne, a Canadian-born Bondi resident. Brunne found a financial backer for his Bondi Beer Company and was encouraged by the reaction of Bondi Icebergs Club members when he test-marketed the beer.

== See also ==
- Australian pub
- Beer in Australia
- List of breweries in Australia
