= Troy Fletcher =

Australian rugby league footballer

Personal information
- Full name: Troy Robert Fletcher
- Born: 1 September 1973 (age 52) Waratah, New South Wales, Australia

Playing information
- Height: 184 cm (6 ft 0 in)
- Weight: 93 kg (14 st 9 lb)
Club
Years	Team	Pld	T	G	FG	P
1996–01	Newcastle Knights	89	2	0	0	8

Troy Fletcher (born 1 September 1973) is an Australian former professional rugby league footballer who played in the late 1990s and early 2000s. He played for the Newcastle Knights, with whom he won the 1997 ARL Premiership.

== Background ==
Fletcher was born in Waratah, New South Wales.

== Playing career ==
Fletcher played his whole professional career at the Knights. He also played in their very first grand final squad in 1997.
