= Andrew Hunter (rugby league) =

Australian rugby league footballer

Personal information
- Full name: Andrew Hunter
- Born: 27 June 1977 (age 47); Sydney, New South Wales, Australia

Playing information
- Position: Wing
Club
Years	Team	Pld	T	G	FG	P
1997–98	Manly-Warringah	27	9	4	0	44
- Source: As of 25 January 2023

Andrew Hunter is an Australian former professional rugby league footballer who played in the 1990s. He played for Manly-Warringah in the ARL/NRL competitions.

== Playing career ==
Hunter made his first grade debut for Manly in round 1 of the 1997 ARL season against Balmain at Leichhardt Oval. In round 5, Hunter scored his first two tries in the top grade as Manly defeated the Sydney City Roosters 34-24. Hunter played a total of 16 games for Manly in the 1997 season as the club claimed their third straight Minor Premiership. Hunter was selected on the interchange bench for their 1997 ARL Grand Final against Newcastle. Manly would lose the final 22-16 after Newcastle player Darren Albert scored on the full-time siren. In the 1998 NRL season, Hunter played 11 games including the clubs elimination finals loss to Canberra. This would be Hunter's final game in the top grade.
