= Jacin Sinclair =

Australian rugby league footballer

Personal information
- Full name: Jacin Sinclair
- Born: 2 January 1972 Sydney, New South Wales, Australia
- Died: 9 December 2010 (aged 38) Woolwich, New South Wales, Australia

Playing information
- Height: 190 cm (6 ft 3 in)
- Weight: 97 kg (214 lb; 15 st 4 lb)
- Position: Centre
Club
Years	Team	Pld	T	G	FG	P
1991–93	Balmain	39	5	0	1	21
1994–96	South Sydney	28	6	0	1	25
1997	Sydney City	7	2	0	0	8
1998–99	Balmain	6	0	0	0	0
	Total	80	13	0	2	54
Representative
Years	Team	Pld	T	G	FG	P
1993	NSW City	1	0	0	0	0
- Source: As of 18 June 2019

Jacin Sinclair (2 January 1972 – 9 December 2010) was an Australian professional rugby league footballer who played in the 1990s. He played for the Balmain Tigers twice, the Sydney Roosters (then known as the Sydney City Roosters) and the South Sydney Rabbitohs as a centre.

== Playing career ==
Sinclair made his debut in 1991 for Balmain against the Gold Coast Seagulls. Sinclair featured more prominently for Balmain over the next two seasons and represented NSW City in 1993. However, in 1994, Sinclair joined South Sydney after having a fallout with Balmain coach Alan Jones. Sinclair spent three seasons at the club before joining Sydney City for the 1997 season.

In 1998, Sinclair returned to Balmain but was limited to six appearances over the final two seasons of his playing career due to injuries. Sinclair intended to play on beyond 1999 but was forced into early retirement after being unable to recover from chronic knee problems. Sinclair attempted to resurrect his career by coming out of retirement to play with South Sydney playing at centre in the Charity shield in 2002 starting at centre.

== Death ==
On 9 December 2010 Sinclair was found dead at his apartment in Woolwich, Sydney. NSW Police stated that Sinclair had not been seen for a number of days leading up to his death. Former players who knew Sinclair spoke to the media in the wake of his death. Former Balmain player Steve Roach said "He could play, don't worry about that". Former Canberra player Laurie Daley said "I know when I played against Jacin it was always a tough game, He was ultra-competitive and a gifted player. It is very sad news".

Paul Sironen said of Sinclair "All of the old Balmain players are very upset, Jacin was always easy to get on with, he was a terrific footballer, but he was compared to some greats of the past when he was young and that pressure made it hard for him".

Australian Rugby League chairman John Chalk said '"He was a champion bloke and a champion footballer, He just had talent to burn. He didn't quite fulfill his promise as a player, because he got a number of injuries as his career went on, and like a lot of young people who are thrust into the limelight because they are good at something, he found it hard to handle all of the attention".
