= Wayne Richards =

Australian rugby league footballer

Personal information
- Born: 2 August 1970 (age 56)

Playing information
- Position: Second-row
Club
Years	Team	Pld	T	G	FG	P
1991–94	Newcastle Knights	20	2	0	0	8
1995–96	Illawarra Steelers	41	2	0	0	8
1997–98	Newcastle Knights	31	2	0	0	8
1999	South Sydney	17	1	0	0	4
	Total	109	7	0	0	28
Representative
Years	Team	Pld	T	G	FG	P
1997	Country NSW	1	0	0	0	0

Wayne Richards is an Australian former professional rugby league footballer who played in the 1990s. A Country New South Wales representative forward, he played his club football for the Newcastle Knights (with whom he won the 1997 ARL premiership), the Illawarra Steelers and the South Sydney Rabbitohs.

== 1991–1996 ==
Richards made his first grade debut as a replacement player for the Newcastle Knights in 1991. He remained with the Knights until the end of the 1994 season when he signed with the Illawarra Steelers in search of regular first team appearances. However, after the 1995 season he returned to Newcastle for the start of the 1996 season.

== 1997 ==
During the 1997 season split between the ARL and the Super League, Richards played for Newcastle (an ARL loyal club). Newcastle went on to win the Grand Final against the Manly-Warringah Sea Eagles 22–16. Richards started the game at second row.

== 1998 ==
In 1998 Richards was one of three members of the Newcastle Knights 1997 ARL grand final winning side who tested positive for banned steroids (also Adam MacDougall, Robbie O'Davis). Richards pleaded guilty, receiving a 22 match suspension. Richards was the only one of the three players to be sacked by the club.

== 1999 ==
Richards made a brief comeback with the South Sydney Rabbitohs after serving his suspension but retired at the end of the 1999 season after South Sydney was excluded from the competition. Richards played in Souths last ever game before their exclusion, a 34–16 defeat against Parramatta.
