= Tony Butterfield =

Australian rugby league footballer

Personal information
- Full name: Anthony Butterfield
- Born: 4 February 1966 (age 60) Penrith, New South Wales, Australia

Playing information
- Height: 183 cm (6 ft 0 in)
- Weight: 103 kg (16 st 3 lb)
- Position: Prop
Club
| Years | Team | Pld | T | G | FG | P |
|---|---|---|---|---|---|---|
| 1984–87 | Penrith Panthers | 9 | 0 | 0 | 0 | 0 |
| 1988–00 | Newcastle Knights | 229 | 27 | 0 | 0 | 108 |
| | Total | 238 | 27 | 0 | 0 | 108 |
Representative
| Years | Team | Pld | T | G | FG | P |
| 1989 | NSW City | 1 | 0 | 0 | 0 | 0 |
| 1998 | New South Wales | 1 | 0 | 0 | 0 | 0 |

Anthony Butterfield (born 4 February 1966) is an Australian former professional rugby league footballer who played in the 1980s and 1990s. A New South Wales State of Origin representative prop-forward, he started his club football career with the Penrith Panthers but played the vast majority of it with the Newcastle Knights, with whom he won the 1997 ARL premiership. He is the father of Australian YouTube personality Isaac Butterfield.

== Playing career ==
Butterfield was born in Penrith, New South Wales, and was signed from the Panthers reserve-grade to join the inaugural Newcastle Knights team for 1988. He remained with the Knights for thirteen seasons, retiring in 2000 as the club's most capped player – a record he later surrendered to Andrew Johns. In 1997 Butterfield was named in the Newcastle Knights Team of the Decade and again, in 2007, in the Team of the Era.

Butterfield was selected for one NSW Origin match; game 3, 1998.

== Players' Association ==
Butterfield was active as a representative of players both during and after his playing days. In the mid-nineties, he was Vice-President of the Kevin Ryan (rugby) led Rugby League Association and when that folded he became involved in the NRLPA in "99 and 2000. In 2000 Butterfield became the president and driving force behind the newly created Rugby League Professionals' Association. The RLPA was involved in unsuccessful negotiations with the NRL to improve players' wages and conditions from 2000 – 2003.

In 2003 the RLPA was registered as a national trade union. It was the first sporting body in the history of Australia to become so registered.

2003 proved to be a turbulent year in the relations between the RLPA and the NRL. Negotiations for player minimum conditions had not gone well during the season. At the end of the season the NRL believed that the players would boycott the competition's major awards night if their demands were not met. Butterfield took a negotiating stance that if the NRL announce that they would accept a number of minimum conditions that would be sufficient to guarantee the players' attendance at the awards. In response, the National Rugby League called the players' union's bluff and cancelled the awards for that year. There was much media comment about the decision. Craig Gower was widely tipped to be the winner of the award for 2003 but never received his medal. Gower was awarded an honorary medal by the RLPA in 2004 in recognition of his support for the players' campaign.

Following the controversy of 2003, and despite some reservations from one club, an agreement was finally reached in 2004.

In 2004 Butterfield instituted the RLPA awards. The RLPA awards are based on peer review. At the end of each match, the players vote to allocate points to the three best players on the opposing team. These points are tallied and at the year RLPA holds its own gala awards night.

== Awards ==
Butterfield was awarded 2004 Organiser of the Year by the Labor Council of New South Wales for his efforts in building up the RLPA.

Butterfield retired from the RLPA in February 2006. He was replaced as head of the RLPA by former Newcastle teammate Matthew Rodwell. The RLPA was deregistered as a trade union in 2008 when Rodwell agreed to accept funding for the Association directly from the NRL.
