= Bluetongue Brewery =

Australian brewery owned by SABMiller

- Industry: Alcoholic drink
- Founded: 2003
- Defunct: 31 May 2014
- Headquarters: Warnervale, Australia
- Products: Beer
- Owner: SABMiller
- Website: www.bluetongue.com.au

Bluetongue Brewery was an Australian brewery owned by SABMiller. The brewery had a capacity of 100 million litres per annum, and supplied beer to all Australian states. On 23 January 2014, it was announced that Bluetongue would be phased out and discontinued as a brand.

== History ==
Bluetongue Brewery was founded in 2003 by four Hunter Valley businessmen, Philip Hele, Bruce Tyrrell, Ian Burford and Paul Hannan in Cameron Park. In 2005 they sold a 50% share in the brewery to interests associated with John Singleton. In December 2007 the consortium sold the brewery to Pacific Beverages, a joint venture between Coca-Cola Amatil and SABMiller. In November 2010 the company opened a $120M brewery in the Central Coast suburb of Warnervale to produce and package the Bluetongue premium beer brands. The brewery, the second largest in New South Wales had the initial capacity of 50 million litres per annum. In 2012, Coca-Cola Amatil sold its 50% share in Pacific Beverages to SABMiller, who had acquired Carlton & United Breweries (the Australian Beer, Cider & Spirits (BCS) division of the Foster's Group).

On 23 January 2014, SABMiller announced that the Bluetongue brand would be discontinued. Sixty-four staff at the Warnervale brewery were told they would lose their jobs towards the middle of the year and that the brewing equipment would be relocated to its Yatala brewery in Queensland with the remaining assets to be sold off.

== Beers ==
- Bluetongue Premium Lager (4.9% alc/vol)
- Bluetongue Pale Ale (5.2% alc/vol)
- Bluetongue Premium Light (2.7% alc/vol)
- Bluetongue Original Pilsener (4.5% alc/vol)
- Bluetongue Black Ale (4.7% alc/vol
- Bluetongue Vintage Ale 2005 (6.6% alc/vol)
- Bluetongue Alcoholic Ginger Beer (4.0% alc/vol)

Other beers brewed:

- Bondi Blonde
- Bruers Bright
- Hunters Old/Hunters Resort Black Ale

== Sponsorship ==
- Bluetongue Brewery was the naming rights sponsor at Central Coast Stadium in Gosford from 2006 until February 2014.

== See also ==
- Beer in Australia
- List of breweries in Australia
