= Robbie O'Davis =

Australia international rugby league footballer

Personal information
- Born: 3 September 1972 (age 54) Kurrajong, New South Wales, Australia

Playing information
- Height: 172 cm (5 ft 8 in)
- Weight: 78 kg (12 st 4 lb)
- Position: Fullback, Wing
Club
Years	Team	Pld	T	G	FG	P
1992–04	Newcastle Knights	223	78	45	1	403
Representative
Years	Team	Pld	T	G	FG	P
1995–02	Queensland	12	1	1	0	6
1995–98	Australia	8	4	0	0	16

Robbie O'Davis (born 3 September 1972) is an Australian former professional rugby league footballer who played in the 1990s and 2000s. An Australian international and Queensland State of Origin representative fullback and occasional winger, he played his entire club career with the Newcastle Knights, winning the 1997 and 2001 Premierships with them.

== Background ==
O'Davis was born in Sydney, Australia. He grew up in Toowoomba, Queensland where he attended Centenary Heights State High School and played for the Newtown Lions in Toowoomba.

== Playing career ==
At 16 he played senior rugby league alongside his father. After playing in the Brisbane Rugby League Premiership for Eastern Suburbs, he joined the New South Wales Rugby League Premiership with the Newcastle Knights.

With the start of the Super League war in 1995 and the Australian Rugby League's stance on not selecting Super League aligned players, O'Davis made his State of Origin debut for Queensland in their surprise 3-0 series win over New South Wales. He was then selected for Australia in the first test of the 1995 Trans-Tasman Test series against New Zealand at Suncorp Stadium in Brisbane. After missing the second test win in Sydney, O'Davis made his run on debut for the Kangaroos in the final test in Brisbane, scoring his first test try in the home sides 46–10 win which completed a 3–0 series win.

Following the 1995 ARL season, O'Davis was selected for Australia's World Cup squad. He played in three games during the World Cup, scoring 5 tries. After playing from the bench in the extra-time Semi-final win over New Zealand, he was selected for the Final at the famous Wembley Stadium, but didn't get off the bench in Australia's 16–8 win over England.

He won the Clive Churchill Medal for best player in the 1997 ARL season's Grand Final over hot favourites and defending premiers Manly-Warringah. However the following year, he and Newcastle teammate Wayne Richards tested positive for Anabolic steroids and received maximum 22-match bans, while another teammate Adam MacDougall received an 11-week suspension.

O'Davis played for Newcastle at fullback in their 2001 NRL Grand Final victory over the Parramatta Eels. Having won the 2001 NRL Premiership, the Knights travelled to England to play the 2002 World Club Challenge against Super League champions, the Bradford Bulls. O'Davis played at fullback in Newcastle's loss. He retired at the end of the 2004 NRL season.
