= Darren Albert =

Australian rugby league footballer

Personal information
- Born: 28 February 1976 (age 50) Auburn, New South Wales, Australia
- Height: 5 ft 11 in (180 cm)

Playing information
- Position: Wing, Fullback
Club
Years	Team	Pld	T	G	FG	P
1996–01	Newcastle Knights	89	65	0	0	260
2002–05	St Helens	124	88	0	0	352
2006	Cronulla Sharks	23	12	0	0	48
	Total	236	165	0	0	660
Representative
Years	Team	Pld	T	G	FG	P
1997–01	NSW Country	2	0	0	0	0
1999	New South Wales	1	0	0	0	0

Darren "DJ" Albert (born 28 February 1976) is an Australian former professional rugby league footballer who played in the 1990s and 2000s. A representative winger, he played his club football for the Newcastle Knights (with whom he won the 1997 ARL Premiership), St. Helens (with whom he won the 2002 Super League Grand Final and the 2004 Challenge Cup) as well as the Cronulla-Sutherland Sharks. Albert also represented Country Origin twice in his career (1997 and 2001). He represented New South Wales for one game in the 1999 State of Origin series.

== Career in Australia ==
Albert made his first grade debut for the Newcastle club in round 2 of the 1996 ARL season against the Western Reds where he scored a try in a 22–16 victory.

Albert is remembered for racing over to score the try in the dying seconds of the 1997 ARL Grand Final against Manly that gave Newcastle a fairy tale maiden premiership. After receiving a pass from Andrew Johns 15 metres from Manly's line, Albert stepped inside Manly's Prop Mark Carroll and sped away to score under the posts to give the Newcastle club a 22–16 win over the defending ARL premiers. Albert also played a prominent role in helping the Knights to reach the Grand Final. In the Preliminary final the week before, he raced across from the far wing to tackle a runaway Matt Seers into touch when it appeared the North Sydney fullback was set to score. Newcastle went on to qualify for their first Grand Final appearance with a 17–12 win over Norths.

In the 2000 NRL season, Albert played 12 games and scored 11 tries including a try in the club's preliminary final loss against the Sydney Roosters. Newcastle had led the game 16–2 at half-time but lost 26–20.

Albert played 23 games and scored 16 tries in the 2001 NRL season but missed Newcastle's grand final victory over Parramatta due to a broken ankle.

In 2006, Albert joined Cronulla-Sutherland and played one season with them scoring 12 tries in 23 games. In January 2007, Albert walked out on the Cronulla club with a year remaining on his contract. Cronulla later attempted to block Albert from playing for another NRL or Super League club with then CEO Greg Pierce saying "We are extremely disappointed in Darren's decision, it must be stressed that the Sharks are not releasing Albert from his contract and he will not be able to play football for another club in 2007. We will stop Albert playing in the UK. He doesn't have a release from us so he won't be playing. He can go over there and play second division if he wants but he can't play in the Super League".

== Career in England ==
Albert played for St. Helens on the wing in their 2002 Super League Grand Final victory against the Bradford Bulls. Having won Super League VI, St Helens contested the 2003 World Club Challenge against 2002 NRL Premiership-winners, the Sydney Roosters. Albert played at fullback in Saints' 38–0 loss.
