= Timana Tahu =

Australia dual-code rugby international footballer

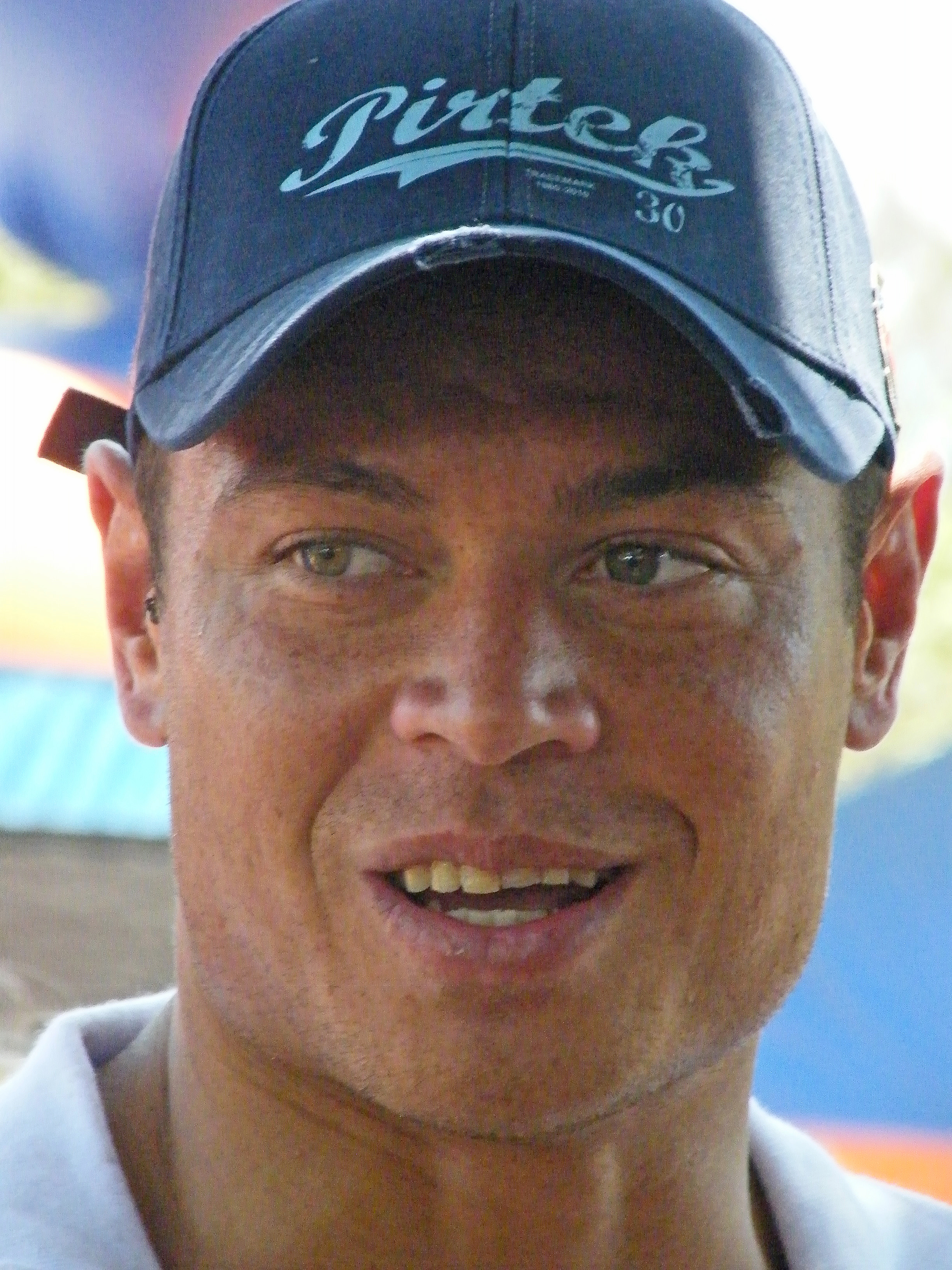

Personal information
- Full name: Timana James Aporo Tahu
- Born: 16 October 1980 (age 46) Melbourne, Victoria, Australia

Playing information
- Height: 185 cm (6 ft 1 in)
- Weight: 98 kg (15 st 6 lb)

Rugby league
- Position: Wing, Centre, Second-row
Club
| Years | Team | Pld | T | G | FG | P |
|---|---|---|---|---|---|---|
| 1999–04 | Newcastle Knights | 97 | 82 | 2 | 0 | 332 |
| 2005–07 | Parramatta Eels | 46 | 20 | 0 | 0 | 80 |
| 2010 | Parramatta Eels | 17 | 5 | 0 | 0 | 20 |
| 2011 | Penrith Panthers | 7 | 3 | 0 | 0 | 12 |
| 2012–14 | Newcastle Knights | 29 | 11 | 0 | 0 | 44 |
| | Total | 196 | 121 | 2 | 0 | 488 |
Representative
| Years | Team | Pld | T | G | FG | P |
| 2001–10 | NSW Country | 4 | 3 | 0 | 0 | 12 |
| 2002–10 | New South Wales | 12 | 8 | 0 | 0 | 32 |
| 2002–06 | Australia | 5 | 5 | 0 | 0 | 20 |
| 2010 | New Zealand Māori | 1 | 0 | 0 | 0 | 0 |
| 2013 | Indigenous All Stars | 1 | 0 | 0 | 0 | 0 |

Rugby union
- Position: Centre
Club
| Years | Team | Pld | T | G | FG | P |
|---|---|---|---|---|---|---|
| 2008–09 | NSW Waratahs | 20 | 3 | 0 | 0 | 15 |
| 2016 | Denver Stampede | 11 | 0 | 0 | 0 | 0 |
| | Total | 31 | 3 | 0 | 0 | 15 |
Representative
| Years | Team | Pld | T | G | FG | P |
| 2008–09 | Australia | 4 | 0 | 0 | 0 | 0 |
| 2008 | Australia A | 5 | 4 | 0 | 0 | 20 |

Timana James Aporo Tahu (born 16 October 1980) is an Australian former professional rugby league and rugby union footballer. He last played for Denver Stampede in the US PRO Rugby competition. A dual-code international representative three-quarter back for Australia's Kangaroos and then the Wallabies, he could also play second-row and played for New South Wales in State of Origin. Tahu started his career in the National Rugby League for the Newcastle Knights, with whom he won the 2001 NRL Premiership before moving to the Parramatta Eels. He then played for the New South Wales Waratahs in the Super Rugby competition. Tahu returned to the NRL with the Eels and then the Penrith Panthers before finishing his NRL career where it started with the Newcastle Knights.

== Background ==
Tahu was born in Melbourne to a New Zealand Māori father and an Australian Aboriginal mother (Kuku Yalanji), as a result, he was eligible for both the New Zealand Kiwis and Australian Kangaroos. He grew up in St Kilda before moving with his mother to Bourke in western New South Wales at the age of 12. From there he went on to live in towns including Wilcannia, Grafton, and Byron Bay.

Tahu and his partner, Kasey, have three children. They met while young; their oldest child was born when he was 18.

== Rugby league career ==
=== Newcastle Knights (1999–2004) ===
Tahu made his first-grade debut in Round 12, 1999, against South Sydney at the Sydney Football Stadium. In the 2000 season, Tahu scored 20 tries in 26 games as Newcastle reached the preliminary final against the Sydney Roosters. Tahu scored a try during the match, which Newcastle lost 26–20.

Tahu played in the Knights 2001 premiership side, scoring a try that cemented the victory as Newcastle defeated Parramatta 30–24. The grand final victory has been described as one of the greatest grand final upsets, as Parramatta went into the game as raging hot favourites and had only lost 4 games all season. Tahu scored 82 tries in 97 games during his first spell with the club.

=== Parramatta Eels (2005-07) ===
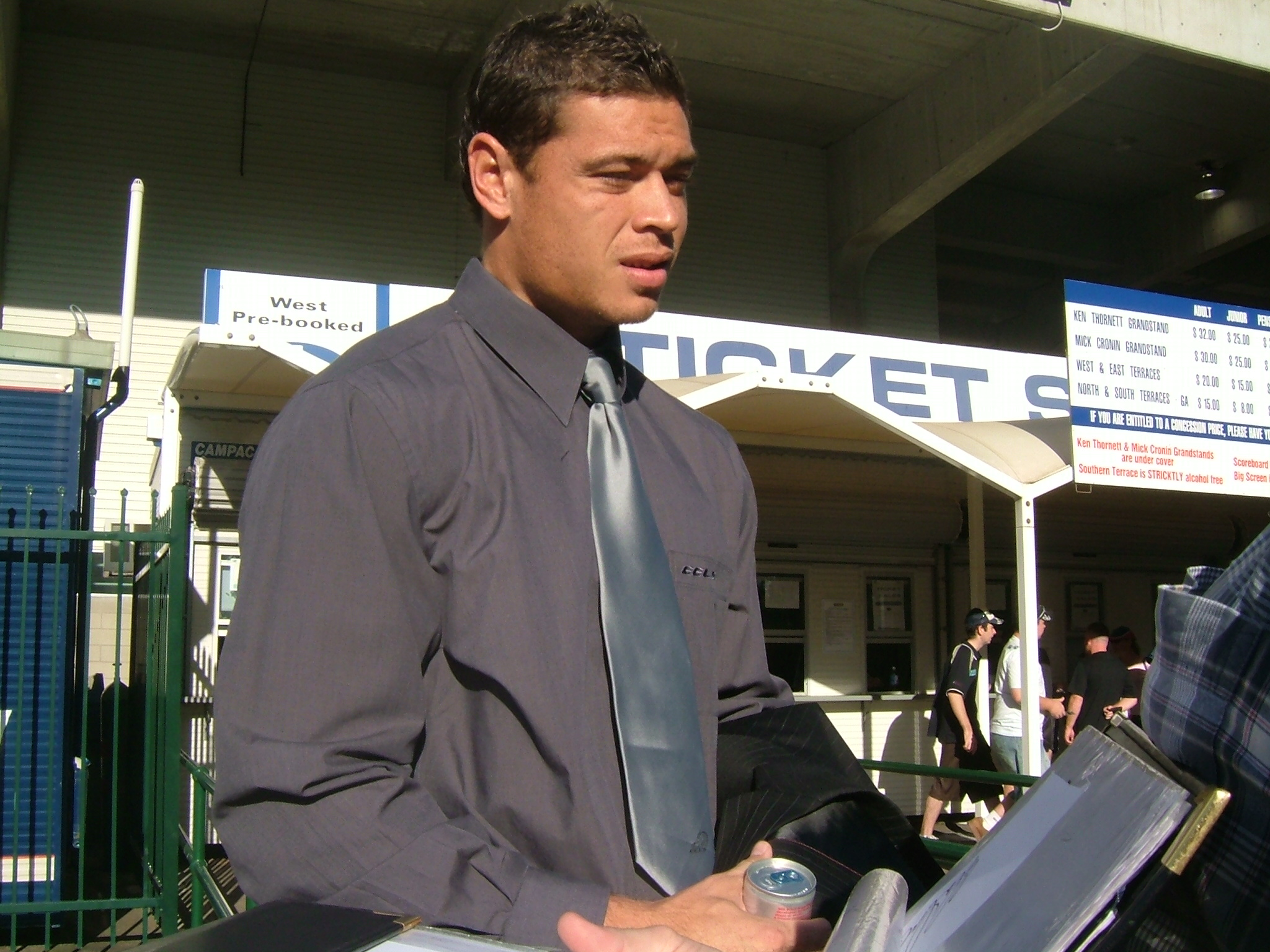
Tahu in 2005

In 2004, Tahu announced that he had signed a 3-year contract to join the Eels. In 2005, Tahu was part of the Parramatta side which won the minor premiership. In round 23, Tahu scored 3 tries in Parramatta's 56–4 win over arch rivals Canterbury where he famously slam dunked the ball over the crossbar after scoring his third try. Parramatta fell short of a grand final appearance that year losing to North Queensland 29–0 in the preliminary final.

On 20 March 2007, Tahu announced he would be switching codes to rugby union join the New South Wales Waratahs in Super Rugby from the 2008 season. Tahu's contract with Parramatta ended at the end of the 2007 NRL season after three seasons in the Eels. The contract with the Waratahs was expected to be a four-year deal.

== Rugby union career ==
=== Waratahs (2008-09) ===
In 2007, Tahu shocked the NRL when he announced that he had decided to move to rugby union. His contract with the Eels was set to expire at the end of the year, thus the NSW Waratahs attempted to sign him.

On 19 December 2007, Tahu agreed to a four-year contract with Shute Shield club, West Harbour. He joined fellow League convert Lote Tuqiri at the club.

In Tahu's final game in the NRL, he was put on report for a head slam on Melbourne Storm player Israel Folau. He received a two-match suspension, and although his rugby league career was over this suspension still carried across into rugby union.

On 26 January 2008, Tahu played his first game of rugby union. The game was a trial match between the NSW Waratahs and the Queensland Reds, which the Waratahs won 26–10.

Tahu made his debut performance in the Super 14 competition in the Waratahs clash with the Wellington Hurricanes on 16 February 2008.

=== Wallabies and Australia A ===
During the 2008 Pacific Nations Cup, Tahu repeatedly performed for Australia A, playing at both wing and inside centre. His performance against Tonga at North Sydney Oval, in front of new Wallabies coach Robbie Deans, in which he played at inside centre, caused him to declare that inside centre is his preferred position. Here he scored a try and made six assists, tearing the opposition defence apart. He also scored the winning try against the Samoans, with a long distance intercept effort. On 6 July Tahu played a pivotal role in the Australian A's final Pacific Nations Cup game against New Zealand Maori, scoring 2 tries.

On 7 July 2008, Tahu was named in the 30 man Wallabies squad for the Tri-Nations series.

On 26 July, Tahu made his first appearance as a substitute for the Wallabies against New Zealand in the Tri-Nations. Despite only coming on towards the end of the game, Tahu effectively made himself Australia's 46th Dual-International. Tahu earned a further cap against South Africa in Johannesburg in a starting role only for the Wallabies to be defeated 53–8.

== Return to rugby league (2010-2014) ==
On 22 July 2009, it was announced that Tahu would return to league and would rejoin his former club, Parramatta Eels on a three-year contract in 2010. He ended his career with league when in 2007, he signed a nearly $2 million, four-year contract with the ARU and NSW Waratahs.

In 2010, Tahu earned a recall to the New South Wales State of Origin team and was involved in a race-related incident with assistant coach Andrew Johns. In New South Wales Blues training, Johns reportedly called Greg Inglis "a black cunt". Tahu withdrew in protest from the New South Wales Origin team. It is believed Johns made the racial slur at a team bonding session. Johns was reported as telling centre Beau Scott he needed to stop Greg Inglis, and made a racial reference to the Maroons Aboriginal star. Tahu's mother is Aboriginal.

Tahu ended his season by playing for the New Zealand Māori against England.

After the tumultuous 2010 season, Tahu requested an extended break from the Eels pre-season training, hoping to return in January 2011. New coach Stephen Kearney denied the request and Tahu was released from his contract. After a period where it seemed possible Tahu would not return to the NRL, Tahu was signed by the Penrith Panthers. Tahu played just 7 games for the Panthers in 2011 before a torn pectoral muscle ended his season. Only a week later it was announced Tahu would be returning to his original club, the Newcastle Knights on a 2-year contract starting from 2012.

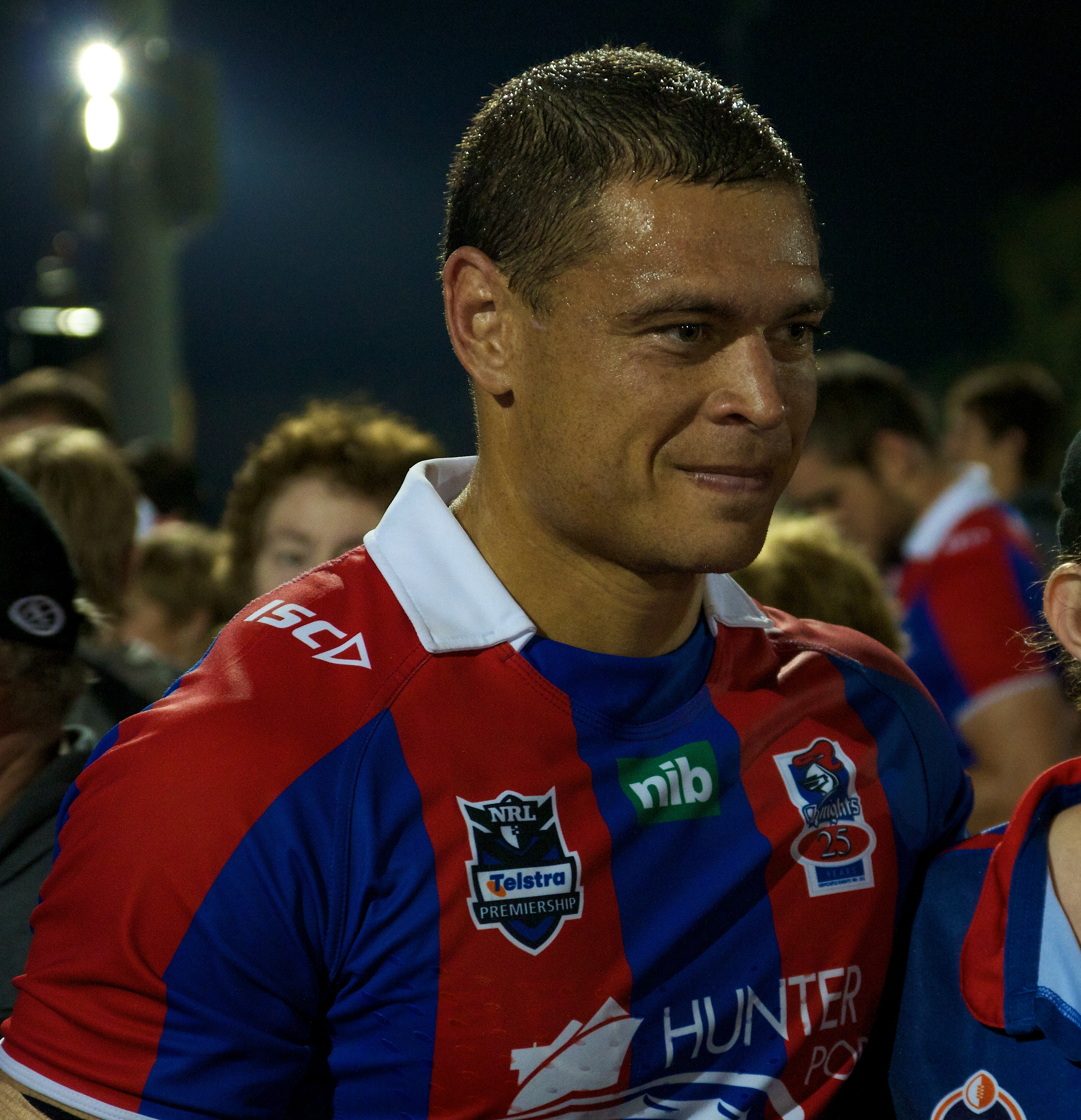
Tahu playing for the Knights

On 6 September 2013, Tahu re-signed with the Knights on a 1-year contract.

Tahu's last game was in Round 26 of the 2014 NRL season, where he came off the bench into the centres for an injured Joseph Leilua. He scored two tries.

== PRO Rugby (2016) ==
It was announced in March 2016 that Tahu would play rugby union in the United States in the newly formed PRO Rugby competition. On 24 April 2016, he came off the bench and played a role in Denver's game in San Francisco only a few days after he had moved to the United States from Australia.

== Achievements ==
- Scored the most tries in a season for Newcastle Knights for 3 consecutive years: scoring 20 tries in 26 games (2000), 18 in 25 games (2001), 21 in 21 games (2002)

== See also ==
- List of players who have converted from one football code to another
