= Andrew Johns =

Australia international rugby league footballer, cricketer, commentator & broadcaster

Andrew "Joey" Johns
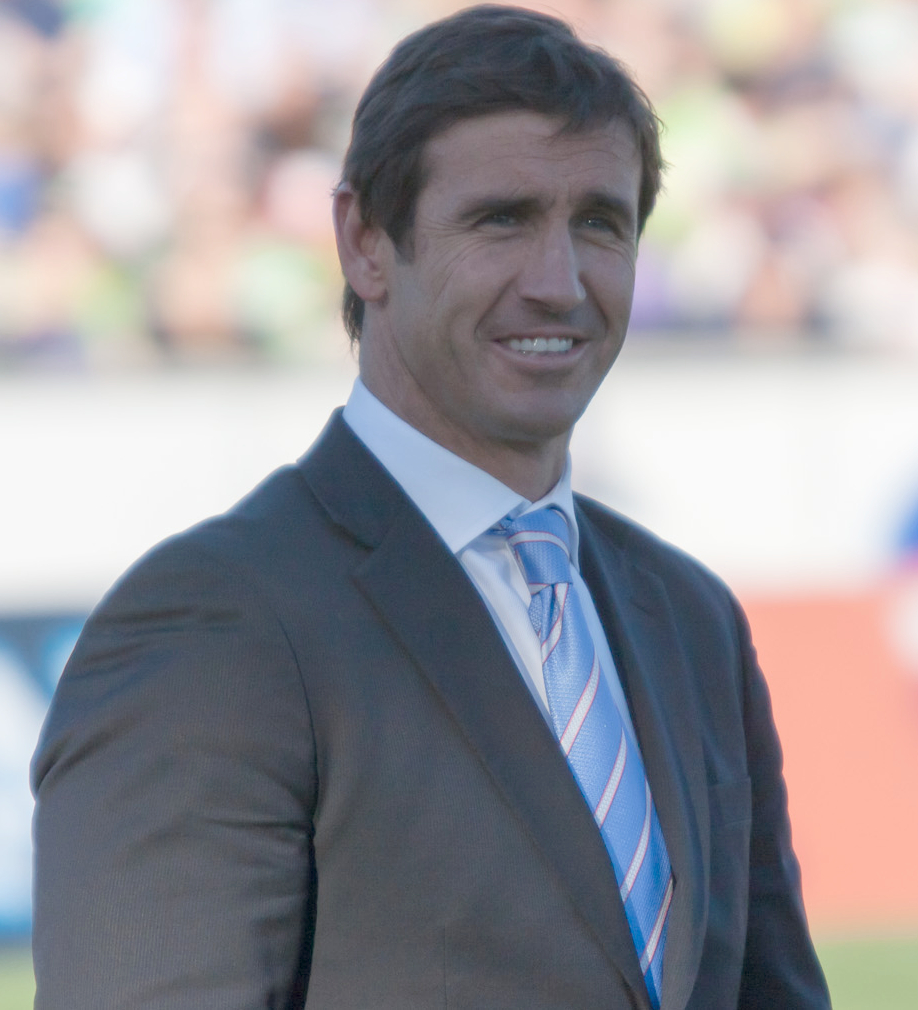

Personal information
- Full name: Andrew Gary Johns
- Born: 19 May 1974 (age 52) Cessnock, New South Wales, Australia

Playing information
- Height: 179 cm (5 ft 10 in)
- Weight: 89 kg (14 st 0 lb)
- Position: Halfback, Hooker
Club
Years	Team	Pld	T	G	FG	P
1993–07	Newcastle Knights	249	80	917	22	2176
2005	Warrington Wolves	3	1	12	1	29
	Total	252	81	929	23	2205
Representative
Years	Team	Pld	T	G	FG	P
1995–03	Country Origin	3	1	7	0	18
1995–05	New South Wales	23	4	37	4	94
1995–06	Australia	26	12	89	0	226
- Relatives: Matthew Johns (brother); Jack Johns (nephew); Cooper Johns (nephew)

Andrew Gary Johns (born 19 May 1974), also known by the nickname Joey, is an Australian former professional rugby league footballer who played in the 1990s and 2000s. He is considered one of the greatest rugby league players of all time. Johns captained the Newcastle Knights in the National Rugby League and participated in the team's only two premiership victories in 1997 and 2001, playing a club record 249 games for the Knights. Johns also represented his country at two World Cups, and on one Kangaroo tour, playing in total 21 Test matches for the national side. He played in 23 State of Origin series matches for the New South Wales Blues (he captained the side to a series win in 2003, and shares a record 4 man-of-the-match awards for New South Wales players with Peter Sterling), and played for the Country Origin side in 1995 and 2003.

Johns announced his retirement from rugby league on 10 April 2007 at the age of 32. This followed a long run of injuries, the last of which was a bulging disc in his neck which forced his retirement due to the risk of serious spinal injury from further heavy contact. Andrew Johns is one of only four players to have won the Golden Boot Award more than once and is one of only two players to have won the Dally M Medal for best player in the NRL three times. He finished his career as the highest points scorer in Australian first-grade premiership history with 2,176 points.

In 2008, less than a year into his retirement, Johns was named as the Greatest Player of the last 30 years by the publication 'Rugby League Week', beating the likes of Queensland legend Wally Lewis (voted #2), fellow NSW star Brad Fittler (voted #3) and then former Queensland and Australian captain Darren Lockyer (voted #4). On 28 September 2012, Johns was named as the eighth 'Immortal' of rugby league.

== Football career ==
=== Early days ===
Andrew Johns began playing junior rugby league in his home town of Cessnock, New South Wales for the Cessnock Goannas.

Four years later, at 19, the opportunity at first grade presented itself as Johns was tested off the bench during the 1993 season in a handful of games. The following year in the last pre-season trial for the 1994 season, Matthew Rodwell, Newcastle's then-regular halfback sustained a knee injury handing Johns his opportunity.

Subsequently, he was named in the starting line-up against the South Sydney Rabbitohs and in his début match made an immediate impact as he amassed 23 points and won the Man of the Match award. He soon formed a winning partnership with his older brother, Matthew, who had played five-eighth at the Knights since 1991.

=== 1995–2001 ===
The 1995 ARL season saw prosperous times for Johns, as in the absence of Super League-aligned players, he was selected for the first time to represent New South Wales in the 1995 State of Origin series. Incumbent New South Wales halfback Ricky Stuart was not selected due to his affiliation with Super League. Also that year he was able to make his début for the Kangaroos in Australia's successful 1995 World Cup campaign in England. He played as a hooker and was named man of the match in the decider against England at Wembley Stadium as Australia once again retained the World Cup.

At the conclusion of the World Cup, Johns was awarded his first significant accolade, being named Most Valuable Player of the tournament. The following year Johns was moved to hooker for the State of Origin, with New South Wales selectors favouring Geoff Toovey in the halfback role. Since then, Johns was regularly chosen for state and national representative sides when fit, only missing out on a Blues or Australian cap due to injury.

During the 1997 ARL season Johns played a pivotal role in guiding the Knights to their first grand final appearance—against defending champions and '97 minor premiers the Manly Warringah Sea Eagles. There were grave concerns leading up to the match that Johns would be unable to play the game, as he had suffered three broken ribs and a punctured lung only a fortnight earlier. However, Johns was able to play, and with less than a minute of the match to go with scores tied at 16-all Johns made a play that has gone down in rugby league folklore. He went out of position unexpectedly and into dummy half where he ran down a narrow blind side before slipping a pass to Newcastle wing Darren Albert for the match-winning try. With only six seconds remaining in the game Newcastle had snatched victory and secured their first premiership title.

The following year in the new National Rugby League the Knights performed even better during the regular season than in the previous year, losing only five matches and narrowly missing out on the minor premiership on points difference. Johns individually was brilliant and was awarded his first Player of the Year Dally M Medal award for the 1998 season. Unfortunately for Johns and NSW fans, he had one of his worst goal-kicking games in Game 1 of the 1998 State of Origin series as NSW lost by one point despite scoring more tries than Queensland. His performances at club, state and national level were again rewarded as he received his second Player of the Year Dally M Medal award, the first time a player had won the award consecutively since Parramatta Eels great Michael Cronin in 1977 and 1978.

Despite initial concerns regarding the leadership of the Knights after the retirement of Paul Harragon, and even more when Andrew's brother Matthew joined English Super League club the Wigan Warriors, Johns was given the responsibility of captaining the Newcastle squad. The fears proved groundless: Johns led Newcastle to another Grand Final victory, defeating the Parramatta Eels 30–24 in 2001. He was awarded the Clive Churchill Medal for Man of the Match in a Grand Final and at the end of the 2001 NRL season, he went on the 2001 Kangaroo tour. He was the top points scorer in Australia's successful Ashes series campaign and was named man of the match for the second Test. Also that year he was awarded the Australian Sports Medal for his contribution to Australia's international standing in the sport of rugby league.

=== 2002–2005 ===
Having won the 2001 NRL Premiership, the Knights travelled to England to play the 2002 World Club Challenge against Super League champions the Bradford Bulls. Johns captained as a halfback, scoring a try and kicking three goals in Newcastle's loss. In 2002, Johns was awarded the captaincy of both New South Wales and Australia, going on to win the title of Player of the Series against Great Britain. At a club level Andrew Johns and the Newcastle Knights performed well, narrowly missing out on the minor premiership on points difference. Unfortunately, the Knights' finals campaign derailed as Johns broke a bone in his back in the first week of the finals, and the Knights without Johns ended up losing to eventual premiers the Sydney Roosters 38–12 to be knocked out of the season. Before his injury Johns' season had been marvellous and despite his lack of involvement in the finals series he was named the Player of the Year Dally M Medal for a record third time, a feat achieved by only one other player, Johnathan Thurston, to date.

Johns' back injury at the tail-end of 2002 was the first of what seemed like a plague of injuries over the next few seasons: he had a serious neck injury that threatened his career in 2003, sustained an anterior cruciate ligament (ACL) knee injury which kept him out of most of the 2004 season, and broke his jaw in early 2005.

During the 2003 Rugby Union World Cup, Wales assistant coach Scott Johnson got Johns to assist with pre-match preparation by speaking to the players and presenting them with their jerseys.

Johns was the centre of controversy in 2004 after receiving a massive offer from rugby union to switch codes. Numerous past legends of both codes expressed their opinions. Debate continues about what happened during the negotiations with rugby union, since the contractual offers were made by the Waratahs without the salary top-ups from the Australian Rugby Union that had been usual in contractual negotiations with previous potential converts from rugby league. The ARU's formal reasons for not supporting the Waratahs' bid to secure Johns were his age (30) and injury history. These were later retracted after the "ecstasy controversy" (see below).

Even without the additional monetary support from the ARU, the Waratahs were able to table an offer to Johns that was far larger than any rugby league club could offer on its own. After David Gallop, the CEO of the NRL and Channel Nine contributed money and a promise of a commentary position after his career ended, Johns finally decided to stay in league, ending months of speculation and debate. He says his decision was greatly affected by his son, who wanted him to stay in league. He was also approached by the Welsh Rugby Union because of his Welsh heritage.

As Game 2 of the 2005 State of Origin series approached, the Blues were down 0–1 and Johns was selected to replace Brett Kimmorley in the New South Wales squad. The second game in the series was his first match since returning from a series of injuries that sidelined him for a number of weeks. Johns did not have to struggle to regain his form, receiving Man-of-the-Match honours in the Blues' 32–22 win over Queensland. He was again chosen as the first-choice halfback for Game 3 and performed well, sealing the series for the Blues with a strong 32–10 win, their last series win for quite some time.

In August 2005, it was announced that Johns would join the Super League side the Warrington Wolves on a short-term deal, playing in the final two games of the regular Super League season and any playoff games the Wolves might reach. The Knights agreed to these terms only after Johns first signed a new contract, making him available to captain the Knights until the end of 2008.

=== 2006–2007 ===
Andrew Johns broke one of the longest-standing records in Round 2 of the 2006 season as he amassed 30 points against the Canberra Raiders and in doing so claimed the points-scoring record for a player at a single club, surpassing Mick Cronin's 1,971 points for Parramatta.

Back in the NRL, playing for Newcastle during a Round 18 match against the Parramatta Eels, Johns' name entered the NRL record books for the second time in the year. A Johns conversion of a Newcastle try made Johns the highest points scorer in the 98-year history of first-grade rugby league in Australia, eclipsing Jason Taylor's previous record of 2,107 points. He rather coincidentally scored the record-breaking conversion in a 46–12 loss to the Eels, who were coached at the time by Jason Taylor.

Things did not start well for Johns in the 2007 season as he lasted only four minutes into Round 1. As Canterbury Bulldogs forward Sonny Bill Williams went to perform one of his trade-mark hits on Johns, the tackle strayed high leaving Johns lying concussed. Williams pleaded guilty at the judiciary to a reckless high tackle, and received a two-week suspension for the hit. Johns missed the following match but returned in Round 3 against the Canberra Raiders—which would be his last career match in the NRL. On the Thursday after the Canberra match, a tackle with Newcastle teammate Adam Woolnough in a training session resulted in his referral to a specialist to examine a neck injury. It was revealed that Johns had a bulging disc in his neck. It was confirmed that this had been present for some time and was not related to the training incident. All medical advice was that Johns should retire from professional football, since any further neck injury could prove life-threatening and on 10 April 2007, Johns announced his retirement from rugby league.

The Newcastle Knights' season would fall apart: they finished 15th of 16 teams on the ladder, narrowly missing out on the Wooden Spoon with a narrow two-point victory in their last match of the season. Johns tried to soften the blow of his retirement by saying he had been seriously considering retirement at the end of the 2007 season and was quoted in the press as saying "I knew this year would be my last year, it's just unfortunate it's stopped five months before the end of the season." Commenting on his teammates' reaction to his retirement, Johns noted: "They were sort of relieved I think, after a couple of injuries this year ... I think the time's right."

On his retirement a chorus of past league greats called for Johns to be immediately honoured as an immortal of the game. In the preceding 13 years, the former Cessnock junior had changed the game like few others before him. In October 2008 Johns completed a walk from Newcastle to Sydney to raise funds for the Black Dog Institute.

== Cricket career ==
Andrew Johns
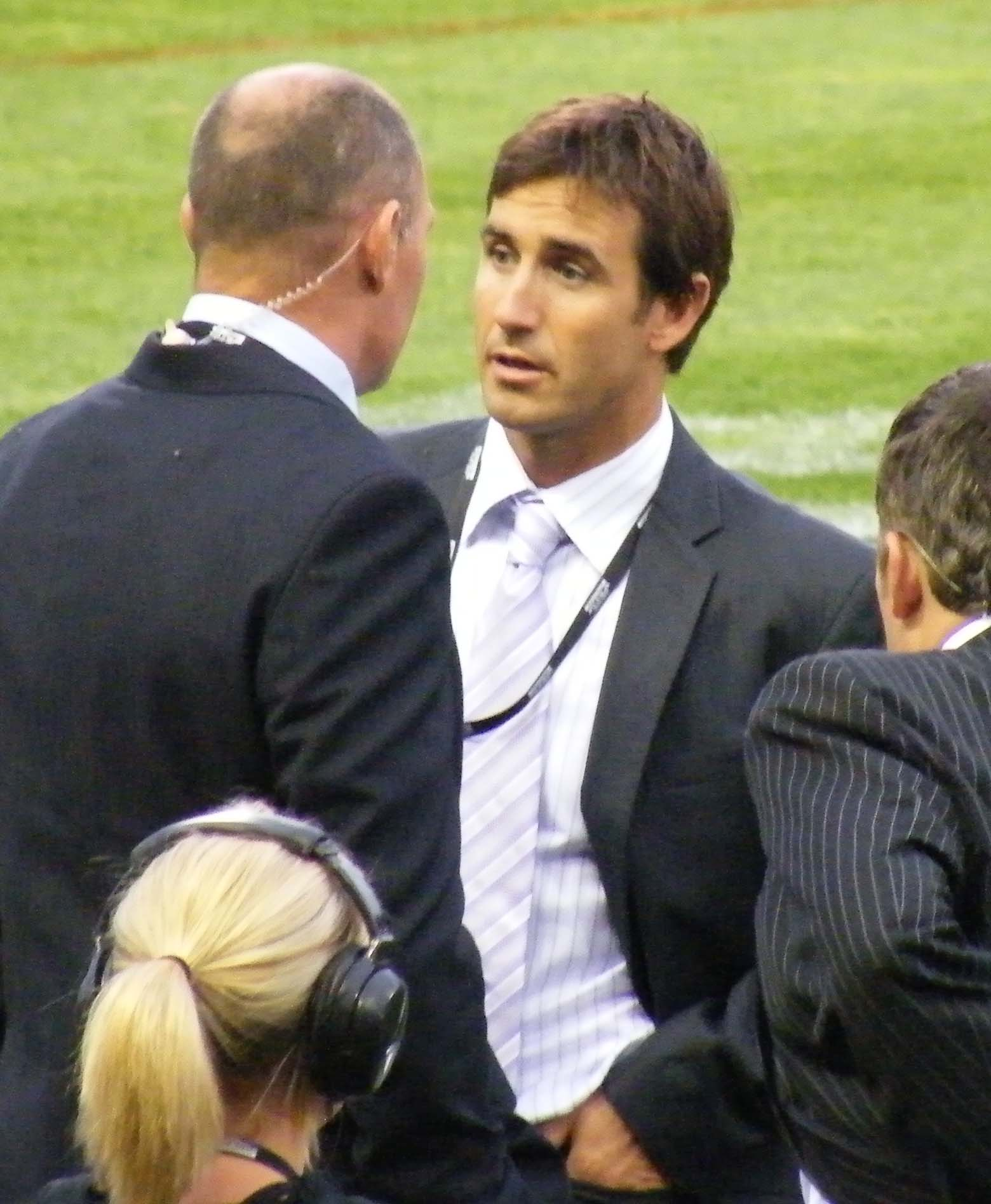

Cricket information
- Batting: Right-handed
- Bowling: Right-arm off break

Domestic team information
- Years: Team
- 2006/07: New South Wales

Career statistics
Competition	Twenty20
Matches	2
Runs scored	9
Batting average	9.00
100s/50s	0
Top score	9
Balls bowled	6
Wickets	0
Bowling average	-
5 wickets in innings	–
10 wickets in match	–
Best bowling	0/9
Catches/stumpings	0/0
- Source: Cricinfo, 6 Jan 2025

In June 2006 it was announced that, while still playing rugby league, Johns would play cricket for New South Wales, in its Twenty20 series. The announcement sparked much media interest and many critics and the public suspected a public relations stunt as his first match was to be played in Johns' home town of Newcastle. Despite this, Johns made his professional cricket debut for NSW on 7 January 2007 against South Australia in front of a record crowd at Newcastle Number 1 Sports Ground. He had a missed opportunity to take a wicket: a short-pitched delivery was pulled to the boundary but much to the dismay of the large Newcastle crowd, the catch was put down. In his second match, against Tasmania at Stadium Australia in Sydney, Johns scored only nine runs and with that his short cricket career was over.

== After retirement ==
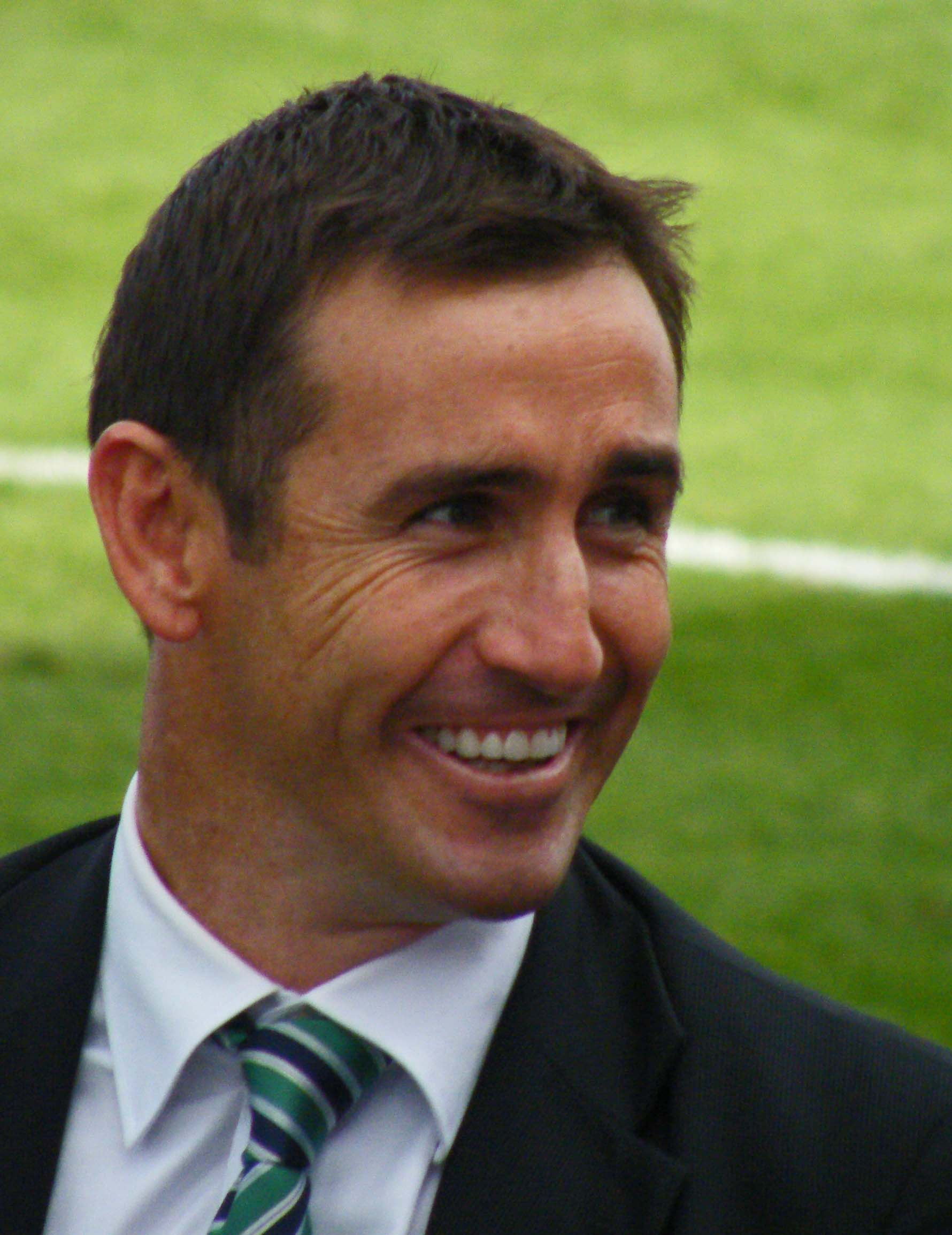
Johns in 2011

Johns sought to celebrate the inclusion of Australia's Dally Messenger in the original All Golds tour, Johns had been invited to join the New Zealand team for the match against the Northern Union. Despite his neck injury, he was able to play with the squad, and completed the match uninjured, but declined another offer from the New Zealand team. Queensland and Australia five-eighth Darren Lockyer was invited to take Johns' place but then Lockyer himself was ruled out after suffering a season-ending knee injury. New Zealand Warriors captain and Queensland front rower Steve Price was the eventual replacement for the match. Andrew became a commentator for Channel 9 and Monday Night Football on Triple M radio.

On 22 April in Round 6 of 2007, Newcastle held special farewell celebrations for Andrew Johns in the Knights' home game against Brisbane. The Knights board renamed the new $30 million East grandstand of EnergyAustralia Stadium the Andrew Johns Stand. In addition, in a first for the NRL, his number 7 jersey was retired for the match with new young halfback Jarrod Mullen wearing number 18. Later in the year the Knights named Johns as halfback and captain for their commemorative Team of the Era.

In June 2007, in what would be the first of his involvements as a specialist part-time coach, rival code the Australian Rugby Union hired Johns as the Wallabies in-play kicking coach for the duration of the 2007 Tri Nations Series. On 27 October 2007, Johns married his partner Cathrine Mahoney in a secret wedding on a Sydney island. When Johns returned from his honeymoon at the beginning of the 2008 Pre-season, he began a part-time coaching role with the Parramatta Eels, working one on one with Eels halves Brett Finch and Tim Smith. In the same time frame Johns worked with his old club the Newcastle Knights in a similar skills specific coaching role. The third club to hire Johns for his coaching services was the Canterbury-Bankstown Bulldogs, who signed Johns for the 2008 season. The role involved him in specifically working with the halves, hookers and backs.

In February 2008, a year after his retirement, Johns moved a step closer to becoming rugby league's next Immortal after being named the Best Player of the Last 30 Years by a major rugby league magazine. On 17 April 2008 he was named in Team of the Century as a halfback by a 28-man judging panel, who voted in a secret ballot and chose the team from an original list of the 100 Greatest Players named earlier in the year. Later, Johns said he felt "the game has forgiven me". On 9 September 2008 at the Dally M awards in Sydney, Johns and his wife Cathrine announced they were expecting their first child in March 2009 (Johns has a son from his previous marriage). On 1 March 2009, Johns and Cathrine welcomed their first child and son, Louis Byron

In 2010 the Melbourne Rebels announced they had secured the services of Johns to work with the Super Rugby club's inside backs. Recent Rebels signing James O'Connor said "Obviously he comes from a league background but there was nobody better at taking the ball to the line and pulling those balls back ... the chance to work with him was pretty awesome."

Despite Johns' ecstasy use controversy, he was officially announced as the eighth 'Immortal' of the game on 28 September 2012, after Rugby League Week magazine stated the voting criteria were to be based solely on a player's "on field performance" (despite admitting to using ecstasy while playing). In early November 2012, Johns signed on as assistant coach of the Manly Warringah Sea Eagles for the 2013 Rugby League season, mentoring and ambassadorial roles.

=== Ecstasy use controversy ===
On 26 August 2007, Johns was arrested for fare evasion on the London Underground, and subsequently found to be in possession of one ecstasy tablet. He was cautioned and released with no further charges. Johns initially claimed that an unknown person had pushed the tablet into his pocket which he later forgot to remove before leaving the crowded venue. This initial statement was met with a great deal of cynicism from both the press and the public. On 30 August, Johns revealed, live on the Footy Show, that he had regularly taken ecstasy throughout his playing career, mainly during the off-season. He claimed he had suffered from depression and bipolar disorder and the drugs helped him in dealing with the high level of psychological 'pressure' associated with his career as an elite sportsman. Not long after the incident he released his 'tell-all' autobiography that went into further details regarding his depression and drug use while playing in the NRL.

The ARU released a press statement shortly after the controversy arose, stating that Johns' drug use was known to the ARU and was a key factor in its decision not to proceed with contractual negotiations in 2004. Brett Robinson, then high-performance unit manager, said that, as well as Johns' age and injury history, the knowledge of his drug taking had been influential in the ARU making its final decision.

=== Racism controversy ===
In June 2010, during the lead-up to Origin II, New South Wales centre Timana Tahu withdrew mid-week from the NSW squad following reports Johns referred to Queensland player Greg Inglis as a "black c*nt" during a training session. Johns was subsequently fired from his role as NSW assistant coach. Though he apologised for the incident on Tuesday 15 June, it is alleged it was not the first time Johns had used racist language in a football environment. Inglis demanded Johns be barred from any involvement in rugby league.

=== More Joyous Scandal ===
Johns was the catalyst to the More Joyous Scandal, engulfing leading Sydney horse trainer Gai Waterhouse, advertising figure John Singleton (racehorse More Joyous's owner) and bookmaker and son of the horse trainer Tom Waterhouse. Johns passed information from Tom Waterhouse that horse More Joyous was "off" on to brothel owner Eddie Hayson and former jockey Allan Robinson. Singleton received word of this and verbally attacked Gai Waterhouse on live television. Johns feared his Channel 9 commentating career would be over due to the trouble he caused Tom Waterhouse, a Channel 9 advertiser. Johns's commentating career survived, although his reputation was further damaged. Both Waterhouses were cleared of any major wrongdoing by a Racing NSW inquiry, however, Singleton and Gai's longstanding partnership ceased until 2016. On 28 September 2023, it was announced that Johns would be stepping down from his role within the New South Wales coaching staff after the NSWRL board informed him his contract would not be renewed after another series loss.

=== Epilepsy ===
In 2019, Johns revealed that he had been diagnosed with epilepsy. His doctors were of the view that his playing career could have contributed to the diagnosis. In an interview with his brother, Matthew Johns on Fox League on Sunday night, he said, "They think maybe a contributor could be some of the concussions I’ve had and ... continual head knocks". Johns lost his driver licence after suffering an epileptic seizure at a cafe in Yamba on the New South Wales north coast in December 2018. The Roads and Maritime Service (RMS) initially refused to return his licence but later did so on appeal.

=== Live State of Origin rant ===
Following the NSW loss to QLD in game 3 of the 2022 State of Origin series, resulting in a QLD series win, Johns was visibly upset while part of a commentary panel during the family friendly Channel 9 live broadcast. In an incident after the game, in which media speculated at the time might have been his unofficial resignation, Johns made the out of context statement in response to a question about the game, "Now we have to listen to all the bullshit from you (Queenslanders) in the next 12 months. It drives you mad."

== Business life ==
Johns is founder and co-owner of Steel City Beer Company with Matthew Johns, Danny Buderus, Kurt Gidley and Matt Hoy.

== Career statistics ==
=== Club career ===
Team	Matches	Tries	Goals	Field Goals	Points
Newcastle Knights 1993–2007	249	80	917	22	2,176
Warrington Wolves 2005	4	1	12	1	29

=== Representative career ===
Team	Matches	Tries	Goals	Field Goals	Points
Country Origin 1995–1996, 2003	3	1	7	0	18
New South Wales 1995–2000, 2002–2003, 2005	23	4	37	4	94
Australia 1995–2003, 2005–2006	27	12	90	0	228

== Achievements, awards and accolades ==
In February 2008, Johns was named in the list of Australia's 100 Greatest Players (1908–2007) which was commissioned by the NRL and ARL to celebrate the code's centenary year in Australia. Johns went on to be named as halfback in Australian rugby league's Team of the Century. Announced on 17 April 2008, the team is the panel's majority choice for each of the thirteen starting positions and four interchange players. In 2008 New South Wales announced their rugby league team of the century also and Johns was again named as a halfback.

=== Newcastle Knights records ===
- Most points in a match: 34 (v Canberra, 29 July 2001)
- Most goals in a match: 11 (v Canberra, 19 March 2006)
- Most points in a season: 279 (2001 National Rugby League Season)
- Most points for the club: 2,176

=== Australian premiership records ===
- Retired as highest individual point scorer in premiership history: 2,176 (eclipsing Jason Taylor's previous record of 2,107; now 4th).
- The competition's leading point scorer in 2001: 279 points.
- Most ever points scored by a halfback in a single National Rugby League season (279 in 2001).

=== International records ===
- Most points scored on international debut: 30 (v South Africa at the 1995 World Cup)
- Most points scored in a test match: 32 (v Fiji in 1996)
- Most goals in a test match: 12 (v Fiji in 1996)

=== Awards ===
- Dally M Medal (best player in the NRL competition): 3 (1998, 1999 and 2002)
- Dally M Halfback of the Year: 4 (1995, 1998, 1999 and 2002)
- Provan-Summons Medal (fans' favourite player): 5 (1998, 1999, 2000, 2001 and 2002)
- Golden Boot (best player in the world): 2 (1999 and 2001)
- Clive Churchill Medal (man-of-the-match in the grand final): 1 (2001)
- Dally M 'Representative Player of the Year' Award: 1 (2005)
- Player of the Series – Australia v Great Britain: 2001
- Most Valuable Player of the Tournament at the 1995 World Cup in England
- State of Origin man-of-the-match: 4 (Game 2, 1996; Game 1, 2002; Game 2, 2003 and Game 2, 2005)
- Voted #1 in the 'Modern Masters Top 30 Players of the Past 30 Years' poll (Rugby League Week)
- Announced as the eighth Immortal of the Australian game on 27 September 2012 joining other greats: Bob Fulton, John Raper, Clive Churchill, Reg Gasnier, Graeme Langlands, Wally Lewis and Arthur Beetson. This being the ultimate honour one could receive as a professional rugby league footballer.
- Inducted into the Sport Australia Hall of Fame on 11 October 2012 at the Crown Palladium in Melbourne along with fellow greats of Australian sport such as Brisbane Broncos coach Wayne Bennett and cricketing great Adam Gilchrist
- In 2025, he was an inaugural inductee of the Stadium Australia Hall of Fame.
- Australian Sports Medal

== See also ==
- List of cricket and rugby league players

Preceded by Gorden Tallis	Australia national rugby league team captain 2002–03	Succeeded by Darren Lockyer
Preceded by Jason Taylor (2006)	Record-holder; Most points in an NRL career 2006 (2,108) – 2009 (2,176)	Succeeded by Hazem El Masri (2009)
