= Marc Glanville =

Australian rugby league footballer

Personal information
- Born: 12 June 1966 (age 59); Wagga Wagga, New South Wales, Australia

Playing information
- Position: Lock
Club
| Years | Team | Pld | T | G | FG | P |
|---|---|---|---|---|---|---|
| 1986–87 | St George Dragons | 8 | 0 | 0 | 0 | 0 |
| 1988–97 | Newcastle Knights | 188 | 17 | 0 | 1 | 69 |
| 1998–99 | Leeds Rhinos | 52 | 5 | 0 | 0 | 20 |
| | Total | 248 | 22 | 0 | 1 | 89 |
Representative
| Years | Team | Pld | T | G | FG | P |
| 1991–97 | Country NSW | 3 | 0 | 0 | 0 | 0 |
- Source: Rugby League Project

Marc Glanville (born 12 June 1966) is an Australian former professional rugby league footballer who played the 1980s and 1990s.

== Playing career ==
A Wagga Wagga Kangaroos junior who went on to be a Country New South Wales representative forward, he played for Australian clubs St. George and Newcastle, and for English club Leeds.

Glanville played for Leeds at loose forward in their 1998 Super League Grand Final loss to Wigan.

Glanville is currently part of KOFM's McDonald's Call Team - commentating Newcastle Knights Games for Newcastle Radio Station, KOFM He played for Country Origin in 1991, 1994 and 1997.
