= List of New Zealand national rugby league team results =

The following lists the international results of the New Zealand national rugby league team:

== All-time records ==
New Zealand have been playing international matches since 1907. Below is a list of test matches played by the New Zealand national rugby league team up until 20 October 2025.

| Country | Matches | Won | Drawn | Lost | Win% | For | Aga | Diff |
|---|---|---|---|---|---|---|---|---|
| Australia | 146 | 35 | 3 | 108 | 23.97% | 1,944 | 3,321 | –1,377 |
| (United Kingdom) (Australia) British Empire XIII | 1 | 0 | 0 | 1 | 0% | 2 | 26 | –24 |
| Cook Islands | 2 | 2 | 0 | 0 | 100% | 134 | 10 | +124 |
| England | 19 | 9 | 1 | 9 | 47.37% | 374 | 342 | +32 |
| France | 56 | 35 | 5 | 16 | 62.5% | 1,067 | 592 | +475 |
| Fiji | 1 | 1 | 0 | 1 | 50% | 26 | 22 | +4 |
| Great Britain | 111 | 41 | 5 | 65 | 36.94% | 1,622 | 2,047 | –425 |
| Great Britain/France | 1 | 0 | 0 | 1 | 0% | 31 | 37 | –6 |
| Ireland | 1 | 1 | 0 | 0 | 100% | 48 | 10 | +38 |
| Jamaica | 1 | 1 | 0 | 0 | 100% | 68 | 6 | +62 |
| Lebanon | 2 | 2 | 0 | 0 | 100% | 98 | 12 | +86 |
| Papua New Guinea | 19 | 18 | 0 | 1 | 94.74% | 866 | 238 | +628 |
| Rest of the World | 1 | 1 | 0 | 0 | 100% | 22 | 10 | +12 |
| Samoa | 6 | 6 | 0 | 0 | 100% | 218 | 68 | +150 |
| Scotland | 3 | 2 | 1 | 0 | 66.67% | 132 | 28 | +104 |
| South Africa | 1 | 0 | 0 | 1 | 0% | 3 | 4 | –1 |
| Tonga | 8 | 6 | 0 | 2 | 75% | 303 | 129 | +174 |
| Wales | 10 | 7 | 0 | 3 | 70% | 264 | 158 | +106 |
| Total | 389 | 167 | 15 | 208 | 42.93% | 7,222 | 7,060 | +162 |

== Results ==
List complete with all test results as of September 2024.

=== 1900s ===
| Date | Opponent | F | A | Venue | City | Crowd | Competition |
|---|---|---|---|---|---|---|---|
| 1 January 1908 | Wales | 8 | 9 | Ynys | Aberdare | 20,000 | 1907–08 All Golds tour |
| 11 January 1908 | England | 18 | 16 | Central Park | Wigan | 12,000 | 1907–08 All Golds tour |
| 25 January 1908 | Great Britain | 6 | 14 | Headingley | Leeds | 8,182 | 1907–08 All Golds tour |
| 8 February 1908 | Great Britain | 18 | 6 | Stamford Bridge | London | 15,000 | 1907–08 All Golds tour |
| 15 February 1908 | Great Britain | 8 | 5 | Athletic Grounds | Rochdale | 4,013 | 1907–08 All Golds tour |
| 8 May 1908 | Australia | 11 | 10 | Agricultural Oval | Sydney | 20,000 | 1907–08 All Golds tour |
| 30 May 1908 | Australia | 24 | 12 | Exhibition Ground | Brisbane | 6,000 | 1907–08 All Golds tour |
| 6 June 1908 | Australia | 9 | 14 | Agricultural Oval | Sydney | 13,000 | 1907–08 All Golds tour |
| 12 June 1909 | Australia | 19 | 11 | Agricultural Oval | Sydney | 6,000 | 1909 All Blacks tour |
| 26 June 1909 | Australia | 5 | 10 | Exhibition Ground | Brisbane | 6,000 | 1909 All Blacks tour |
| 3 July 1909 | Australia | 5 | 25 | Wentworth Park | Sydney | 6,000 | 1909 All Blacks tour |

=== 1910s ===
| Date | Opponent | F | A | Venue | City | Crowd | Competition |
|---|---|---|---|---|---|---|---|
| 30 July 1910 | Great Britain | 20 | 52 | Auckland Domain | Auckland | 16,000 | 1910 Lions tour |
| 1 August 1914 | Great Britain | 13 | 16 | Auckland Domain | Auckland | 15,000 | 1914 Lions tour |
| 23 August 1919 | Australia | 21 | 44 | Basin Reserve | Wellington | 8,000 | 1919 Kangaroo tour |
| 30 August 1919 | Australia | 26 | 10 | Addington Showgrounds | Christchurch | 7,000 | 1919 Kangaroo tour |
| 6 September 1919 | Australia | 23 | 34 | Carlaw Park | Auckland | 24,300 | 1919 Kangaroo tour |
| 13 September 1919 | Australia | 2 | 32 | Carlaw Park | Auckland | 15,000 | 1919 Kangaroo tour |

=== 1920s ===
| Date | Opponent | F | A | Venue | City | Crowd | Competition |
|---|---|---|---|---|---|---|---|
| 31 July 1920 | Great Britain | 7 | 31 | Auckland Domain | Auckland | 34,000 | 1920 Lions tour |
| 7 August 1920 | Great Britain | 3 | 19 | Lancaster Park | Christchurch | 10,000 | 1920 Lions tour |
| 14 August 1920 | Great Britain | 10 | 23 | Basin Reserve | Wellington | 5,000 | 1920 Lions tour |
| 2 August 1924 | Great Britain | 16 | 8 | Carlaw Park | Auckland | 22,000 | 1924 Lions tour |
| 6 August 1924 | Great Britain | 13 | 11 | Basin Reserve | Wellington | 6,000 | 1924 Lions tour |
| 9 August 1924 | Great Britain | 18 | 31 | Tahuna Park | Dunedin | 14,000 | 1924 Lions tour |
| 2 October 1926 | Great Britain | 20 | 28 | Central Park | Wigan | 14,500 | 1926–27 Kiwi tour |
| 3 November 1926 | Great Britain | 11 | 21 | The Boulevard | Kingston-upon-Hull | 7,000 | 1926–27 Kiwi tour |
| 4 December 1926 | Wales | 8 | 34 | Taff Vale Park | Pontypridd | 13,000 | 1926–27 Kiwi tour |
| 15 January 1927 | Great Britain | 17 | 32 | Headingley | Leeds | 6,000 | 1926–27 Kiwi tour |
| 4 August 1928 | Great Britain | 17 | 13 | Carlaw Park | Auckland | 28,000 | 1928 Lions tour |
| 18 August 1928 | Great Britain | 5 | 13 | Caledonian Ground | Dunedin | 12,000 | 1928 Lions tour |
| 25 August 1928 | Great Britain | 5 | 6 | English Park | Christchurch | 21,000 | 1928 Lions tour |

=== 1930s ===
| Date | Opponent | F | A | Venue | City | Crowd | Competition |
|---|---|---|---|---|---|---|---|
| 30 July 1932 | Great Britain | 9 | 34 | Carlaw Park | Auckland | 25,000 | 1932 Lions tour |
| 13 August 1932 | Great Britain | 14 | 25 | | Christchurch | 5,000 | 1932 Lions tour |
| 20 August 1932 | Great Britain | 18 | 20 | Carlaw Park | Auckland | 6,500 | 1932 Lions tour |
| 28 September 1935 | Australia | 22 | 14 | Carlaw Park | Auckland | 20,000 | 1935 Kangaroo tour |
| 2 October 1935 | Australia | 8 | 31 | Carlaw Park | Auckland | 8,000 | 1935 Kangaroo tour |
| 4 October 1935 | Australia | 8 | 31 | Carlaw Park | Auckland | 20,000 | 1935 Kangaroo tour |
| 30 July 1936 | Great Britain | 8 | 10 | Carlaw Park | Auckland | 25,000 | 1936 Lions tour |
| 20 August 1936 | Great Britain | 11 | 23 | Carlaw Park | Auckland | 17,000 | 1936 Lions tour |
| 7 August 1937 | Australia | 8 | 12 | Carlaw Park | Auckland | 12,000 | 1937–38 Kangaroo tour |
| 14 August 1937 | Australia | 16 | 15 | Carlaw Park | Auckland | 25,000 | 1937–38 Kangaroo tour |

=== 1940s ===
| Date | Opponent | F | A | Venue | City | Crowd | Competition |
|---|---|---|---|---|---|---|---|
| 10 August 1946 | Great Britain | 13 | 8 | Carlaw Park | Auckland | 11,000 | 1946 Lions tour |
| 4 October 1947 | Great Britain | 10 | 11 | Headingley | Leeds | 28,445 | 1947–48 Kiwi tour |
| 18 October 1947 | Wales | 20 | 28 | St Helen's Rugby and Cricket Ground | Swansea | 18,283 | 1947–48 Kiwi tour |
| 8 November 1947 | Great Britain | 10 | 7 | Station Road | Swinton | 29,031 | 1947–48 Kiwi tour |
| 20 December 1947 | Great Britain | 9 | 25 | Odsal Stadium | Bradford | 42,685 | 1947–48 Kiwi tour |
| 28 December 1947 | France | 11 | 7 | Parc des Princes | Paris | 15,000 | 1947–48 Kiwi tour |
| 25 January 1948 | France | 7 | 25 | Stade Chaban–Delmas | Bordeaux | 22,000 | 1947–48 Kiwi tour |
| 29 May 1948 | Australia | 21 | 19 | Sydney Cricket Ground | Sydney | 55,866 | 1948 Kiwi tour |
| 12 June 1948 | Australia | 4 | 13 | Brisbane Cricket Ground | Brisbane | 23,013 | 1948 Kiwi tour |
| 17 September 1949 | Australia | 26 | 21 | Basin Reserve | Wellington | 7,737 | 1949 Kangaroo tour |
| 8 October 1949 | Australia | 10 | 31 | Carlaw Park | Auckland | 12,361 | 1949 Kangaroo tour |

=== 1950s ===
| Date | Opponent | F | A | Venue | City | Crowd | Competition |
|---|---|---|---|---|---|---|---|
| 29 July 1950 | Great Britain | 16 | 10 | Rugby League Park | Christchurch | 10,000 | 1950 Lions tour |
| 12 August 1950 | Great Britain | 20 | 13 | Carlaw Park | Auckland | 20,000 | 1950 Lions tour |
| 4 August 1951 | France | 16 | 15 | Carlaw Park | Auckland | 19,229 | 1951 France tour |
| 6 October 1951 | Great Britain | 15 | 21 | Odsal Stadium | Bradford | 37,475 | 1951–52 Kiwi tour |
| 10 November 1951 | Great Britain | 19 | 20 | Station Road | Swinton | 29,938 | 1951–52 Kiwi tour |
| 7 December 1951 | Wales | 15 | 3 | Odsal Stadium | Bradford | 18,283 | 1951–52 Kiwi tour |
| 15 December 1951 | Great Britain | 12 | 16 | Headingley | Leeds | 18,649 | 1951–52 Kiwi tour |
| 23 December 1951 | France | 3 | 8 | Parc des Princes | Paris | 23,459 | 1951–52 Kiwi tour |
| 30 December 1951 | France | 7 | 17 | Stade Chaban-Delmas | Bordeaux | 11,110 | 1951–52 Kiwi tour |
| 23 January 1952 | (United Kingdom) (Australia) British Empire XIII | 2 | 26 | Stamford Bridge | London | ~6,000 | 1951–52 Kiwi tour |
| 9 June 1952 | Australia | 13 | 25 | Sydney Cricket Ground | Sydney | 56,376 | 1952 Kiwi tour |
| 28 June 1952 | Australia | 49 | 25 | Brisbane Cricket Ground | Brisbane | 29,245 | 1952 Kiwi tour |
| 2 July 1952 | Australia | 19 | 9 | Sydney Cricket Ground | Sydney | 44,916 | 1952 Kiwi tour |
| 27 June 1953 | Australia | 25 | 5 | Addington Showgrounds | Christchurch | 5,509 | 1953 Kangaroo tour |
| 4 July 1953 | Australia | 12 | 11 | Basin Reserve | Wellington | 5,394 | 1953 Kangaroo tour |
| 18 July 1953 | Australia | 16 | 18 | Carlaw Park | Auckland | 16,033 | 1953 Kangaroo tour |
| 21 July 1954 | Great Britain | 7 | 27 | Carlaw Park | Auckland | 22,097 | 1954 Lions tour |
| 31 July 1954 | Great Britain | 20 | 14 | Wingham Park | Greymouth | 4,240 | 1954 Lions tour |
| 14 August 1954 | Great Britain | 6 | 12 | Carlaw Park | Auckland | 6,186 | 1954 Lions tour |
| 30 October 1954 | France | 13 | 22 | Parc des Princes | Paris | Unknown | 1954 World Cup |
| 7 November 1954 | Australia | 15 | 34 | Stade Vélodrome | Marseille | Unknown | 1954 World Cup |
| 11 November 1954 | Great Britain | 6 | 26 | Stade Chaban-Delmas | Bordeaux | Unknown | 1954 World Cup |
| 6 August 1955 | France | 9 | 19 | Carlaw Park | Auckland | 20,500 | 1955 France tour |
| 13 August 1955 | France | 11 | 6 | Carlaw Park | Auckland | 12,000 | 1955 France tour |
| 8 October 1955 | Great Britain | 6 | 25 | Station Road | Swinton | 21,937 | 1955–56 Kiwi tour |
| 12 November 1955 | Great Britain | 12 | 27 | Odsal Stadium | Bradford | 24,443 | 1955–56 Kiwi tour |
| 17 December 1955 | Great Britain | 28 | 13 | Headingley | Leeds | 10,438 | 1955–56 Kiwi tour |
| 8 January 1956 | France | 7 | 24 | Stadium de Toulouse | Toulouse | 10,184 | 1955–56 Kiwi tour |
| 15 January 1956 | France | 31 | 22 | Stade de Gerland | Lyon | 7,051 | 1955–56 Kiwi tour |
| 31 January 1956 | France | 3 | 24 | Parc des Princes | Paris | 14,752 | 1955–56 Kiwi tour |
| 9 June 1956 | Australia | 9 | 12 | Sydney Cricket Ground | Sydney | 46,766 | 1956 Kiwi tour |
| 23 June 1956 | Australia | 2 | 8 | Exhibition Ground | Brisbane | 28,361 | 1956 Kiwi tour |
| 30 June 1956 | Australia | 14 | 31 | Sydney Cricket Ground | Sydney | 49,735 | 1956 Kiwi tour |
| 15 June 1957 | Australia | 5 | 25 | The Gabba | Brisbane | 29,636 | 1957 World Cup |
| 17 June 1957 | France | 10 | 14 | The Gabba | Brisbane | 22,142 | 1957 World Cup |
| 15 June 1957 | Great Britain | 25 | 21 | Sydney Cricket Ground | Sydney | 14,263 | 1957 World Cup |
| 3 July 1957 | (United Kingdom) Great Britain and France Combined XIII | 31 | 37 | | Auckland | ~15,000 | Friendly |
| 26 July 1958 | Great Britain | 15 | 10 | Carlaw Park | Auckland | 25,000 | 1958 Lions tour |
| 9 August 1958 | Great Britain | 15 | 32 | Carlaw Park | Auckland | 25,000 | 1958 Lions tour |
| 13 June 1959 | Australia | 8 | 9 | Sydney Cricket Ground | Sydney | 38,613 | 1959 Kiwi tour |
| 27 June 1959 | Australia | 10 | 28 | Exhibition Ground | Brisbane | 30,994 | 1959 Kiwi tour |
| 4 July 1959 | Australia | 28 | 12 | Sydney Cricket Ground | Sydney | 31,629 | 1959 Kiwi tour |

=== 1960s ===
| Date | Opponent | F | A | Venue | City | Crowd | Competition |
|---|---|---|---|---|---|---|---|
| 23 July 1960 | France | 9 | 2 | Carlaw Park | Auckland | 17,914 | 1960 France tour |
| 6 August 1960 | France | 9 | 3 | Carlaw Park | Auckland | 14,007 | 1960 France tour |
| 24 September 1960 | Great Britain | 8 | 23 | Odsal Stadium | Bradford | 20,577 | 1960 World Cup |
| 1 October 1960 | Australia | 15 | 21 | Headingley | Leeds | 10,773 | 1960 World Cup |
| 8 October 1960 | France | 9 | 0 | Central Park | Wigan | 2,876 | 1960 World Cup |
| 1 July 1961 | Australia | 12 | 10 | Carlaw Park | Auckland | 11,485 | 1961 Kangaroo tour |
| 8 July 1961 | Australia | 10 | 8 | Carlaw Park | Auckland | 12,424 | 1961 Kangaroo tour |
| 1961 | Great Britain | 29 | 11 | Headingley | Leeds | Unknown | 1961 Kiwi tour |
| 1961 | Great Britain | 10 | 23 | Odsal Stadium | Bradford | Unknown | 1961 Kiwi tour |
| 1961 | Great Britain | 19 | 35 | Station Road | Swinton | Unknown | 1961 Kiwi tour |
| 11 November 1961 | France | 6 | 6 | Stadium de Toulouse | Toulouse | 2,375 | 1961 Kiwi tour |
| 19 November 1961 | France | 23 | 2 | Stade Jean Laffon | Perpignan | 9,020 | 1961 Kiwi tour |
| 9 December 1961 | France | 5 | 5 | Stade Bauer | Paris | 3,307 | 1961 Kiwi tour |
| 1962 | Great Britain | 19 | 0 | Carlaw Park | Auckland | Unknown | 1962 Lions tour |
| 1962 | Great Britain | 27 | 0 | Carlaw Park | Auckland | Unknown | 1962 Lions tour |
| 7 June 1963 | Australia | 3 | 7 | Sydney Cricket Ground | Sydney | 48,330 | 1963 Kiwi tour |
| 22 June 1963 | Australia | 16 | 13 | Lang Park | Brisbane | 30,748 | 1963 Kiwi tour |
| 29 June 1963 | Australia | 17 | 18 | Sydney Cricket Ground | Sydney | 45,657 | 1963 Kiwi tour |
| 10 August 1963 | South Africa | 4 | 3 | Carlaw Park | Auckland | Unknown | 1963 Rhinos tour |
| 25 July 1964 | France | 24 | 6 | Carlaw Park | Auckland | 10,148 | 1964 France tour |
| 1 August 1964 | France | 18 | 8 | Rugby League Park | Christchurch | 4,935 | 1964 France tour |
| 5 August 1964 | France | 10 | 2 | Carlaw Park | Auckland | 7,279 | 1964 France tour |
| 19 July 1965 | Australia | 8 | 13 | Carlaw Park | Auckland | 13,295 | 1965 Kangaroo tour |
| 26 June 1965 | Australia | 7 | 5 | Carlaw Park | Auckland | 11,385 | 1965 Kangaroo tour |
| 1965 | Great Britain | 2 | 9 | Station Road | Swinton | Unknown | 1965 Kiwi tour |
| 1965 | Great Britain | 9 | 15 | Odsal Stadium | Bradford | Unknown | 1965 Kiwi tour |
| 1965 | Great Britain | 9 | 9 | Central Park | Wigan | Unknown | 1965 Kiwi tour |
| 15 November 1965 | France | 3 | 14 | Stade Vélodrome | Marseille | 30,431 | 1965 Kiwi tour |
| 28 November 1965 | France | 2 | 6 | Stade Gilbert Brutus | Perpignan | 9,000 | 1965 Kiwi tour |
| 12 December 1965 | France | 5 | 28 | Stade des Minimes | Toulouse | 7,000 | 1965 Kiwi tour |
| 1966 | Great Britain | 8 | 25 | Carlaw Park | Auckland | Unknown | 1966 Lions tour |
| 1966 | Great Britain | 14 | 22 | Carlaw Park | Auckland | Unknown | 1966 Lions tour |
| 10 June 1967 | Australia | 13 | 22 | Sydney Cricket Ground | Sydney | 33,416 | 1967 Kiwi tour |
| 1 July 1967 | Australia | 22 | 35 | Lang Park | Brisbane | 30,122 | 1967 Kiwi tour |
| 8 July 1967 | Australia | 9 | 13 | Sydney Cricket Ground | Sydney | 27,530 | 1967 Kiwi tour |
| 25 May 1968 | France | 10 | 15 | Carlaw Park | Auckland | 18,000 | 1968 World Cup |
| 1 June 1968 | Australia | 12 | 31 | Lang Park | Brisbane | 23,608 | 1968 World Cup |
| 8 June 1968 | Great Britain | 14 | 38 | Sydney Cricket Ground | Sydney | 14,105 | 1968 World Cup |
| 1 June 1969 | Australia | 10 | 20 | Carlaw Park | Auckland | 13,375 | 1969 Kangaroo tour |
| 7 June 1969 | Australia | 18 | 14 | Carlaw Park | Auckland | 9,848 | 1969 Kangaroo tour |

=== 1970s ===
| Date | Opponent | F | A | Venue | City | Crowd | Competition |
|---|---|---|---|---|---|---|---|
| 21 October 1970 | Australia | 11 | 47 | Central Park | Wigan | 9,805 | 1970 World Cup |
| 25 October 1970 | France | 16 | 15 | The Boulevard | Kingston-upon-Hull | 3,824 | 1970 World Cup |
| 31 October 1970 | Great Britain | 17 | 27 | Station Road | Swinton | 5,609 | 1970 World Cup |
| 26 June 1971 | Australia | 24 | 3 | Carlaw Park | Auckland | 13,917 | 1971 Kangaroo tour |
| 1971 | Great Britain | 3 | 12 | Headingley | Leeds | Unknown | 1971 Kiwi tour |
| 1971 | Great Britain | 18 | 13 | The Willows, Salford | Salford | Unknown | 1971 Kiwi tour |
| 1971 | Great Britain | 17 | 14 | Wheldon Road | Castleford | Unknown | 1971 Kiwi tour |
| 11 November 1971 | France | 27 | 11 | Stade Gilbert Brutus | Perpignan | 3,581 | 1971 Kiwi tour |
| 21 November 1971 | France | 24 | 2 | Stade Albert Domec | Carcassonne | 7,200 | 1971 Kiwi tour |
| 28 November 1971 | France | 3 | 3 | Stadium de Toulouse | Toulouse | 5,000 | 1971 Kiwi tour |
| 8 July 1972 | Australia | 11 | 36 | Sydney Cricket Ground | Sydney | 29,714 | 1972 Kiwi tour |
| 15 July 1972 | Australia | 7 | 31 | Lang Park | Brisbane | 24,000 | 1972 Kiwi tour |
| 28 October 1972 | France | 9 | 20 | Stade Vélodrome | Marseille | Unknown | 1972 World Cup |
| 1 October 1972 | Australia | 5 | 9 | Parc des Princes | Paris | Unknown | 1972 World Cup |
| 4 November 1972 | Great Britain | 19 | 53 | Stade du Hameau | Pau | Unknown | 1972 World Cup |
| 1974 | Great Britain | 13 | 8 | Carlaw Park | Auckland | Unknown | 1974 Lions tour |
| 1974 | Great Britain | 8 | 17 | Rugby League Park | Christchurch | Unknown | 1974 Lions tour |
| 1974 | Great Britain | 0 | 20 | Carlaw Park | Auckland | Unknown | 1974 Lions tour |
| 1 June 1975 | Australia | 8 | 36 | Lang Park | Brisbane | 12,000 | 1975 World Cup |
| 15 June 1975 | France | 27 | 0 | Rugby League Park | Christchurch | 2,500 | 1975 World Cup |
| 21 June 1975 | England | 17 | 17 | Carlaw Park | Auckland | 12,000 | 1975 World Cup |
| 28 June 1975 | Wales | 13 | 8 | Carlaw Park | Auckland | 9,368 | 1975 World Cup |
| 27 September 1975 | Australia | 8 | 24 | Carlaw Park | Auckland | 18,000 | 1975 World Cup |
| 17 October 1975 | France | 12 | 12 | Stade Vélodrome | Marseille | 10,000 | 1975 World Cup |
| 25 October 1975 | France | 12 | 27 | Odsal Stadium | Bradford | 5,507 | 1975 World Cup |
| 2 November 1975 | Wales | 24 | 25 | St Helen's Rugby and Cricket Ground | Swansea | 2,645 | 1975 World Cup |
| 29 May 1977 | Australia | 12 | 21 | Carlaw Park | Auckland | 18,000 | 1977 World Cup |
| 12 June 1977 | Great Britain | 12 | 30 | Rugby League Park | Christchurch | 9,000 | 1977 World Cup |
| 19 June 1977 | France | 28 | 20 | Carlaw Park | Auckland | 8,000 | 1977 World Cup |
| 24 June 1978 | Australia | 2 | 24 | Sydney Cricket Ground | Sydney | 16,577 | 1978 Kiwi tour |
| 15 July 1978 | Australia | 7 | 38 | Lang Park | Brisbane | 14,000 | 1978 Kiwi tour |
| 22 July 1978 | Australia | 16 | 33 | Sydney Cricket Ground | Sydney | 6,541 | 1978 Kiwi tour |
| 1978 | Papua New Guinea | 30 | 21 | PNG Football Stadium | Port Moresby | Unknown | 1978 Kiwi tour |
| 1979 | Great Britain | 8 | 16 | Carlaw Park | Auckland | Unknown | 1979 Lions tour |
| 1979 | Great Britain | 7 | 22 | Rugby League Park | Christchurch | Unknown | 1979 Lions tour |
| 1979 | Great Britain | 18 | 11 | Carlaw Park | Auckland | Unknown | 1979 Lions tour |

=== 1980s ===
| Date | Opponent | F | A | Venue | City | Crowd | Competition |
|---|---|---|---|---|---|---|---|
| 1 June 1980 | Australia | 6 | 27 | Carlaw Park | Auckland | 12,321 | 1980 Kangaroo tour |
| 15 June 1980 | Australia | 6 | 15 | Carlaw Park | Auckland | 9,706 | 1980 Kangaroo tour |
| 18 October 1980 | Great Britain | 14 | 14 | Central Park | Wigan | 7 031 | 1980 Kiwi tour |
| 26 October 1980 | Great Britain | 2 | 10 | Headingley | Leeds | 5662 | 1980 Kiwi tour |
| 2 November 1980 | Great Britain | 12 | 8 | Odsal Stadium | Bradford | 10 946 | 1980 Kiwi tour |
| 23 November 1980 | France | 5 | 6 | Stade Gilbert Brutus | Perpignan | 6,000 | 1980 Kiwi tour |
| 7 December 1980 | France | 11 | 3 | Stadium de Toulouse | Toulouse | 3,000 | 1980 Kiwi tour |
| 7 July 1981 | France | 26 | 3 | Carlaw Park | Auckland | 12,200 | 1981 France tour |
| 21 June 1981 | France | 25 | 2 | Carlaw Park | Auckland | 8,100 | 1981 France tour |
| 3 July 1982 | Australia | 8 | 11 | Lang Park | Brisbane | 11,400 | 1982 Kiwi tour |
| 17 July 1982 | Australia | 2 | 20 | Sydney Cricket Ground | Sydney | 16,775 | 1982 Kiwi tour |
| 1982 | Papua New Guinea | 56 | 5 | PNG Football Stadium | Port Moresby | Unknown | 1982 Kiwi tour |
| 12 June 1983 | Australia | 4 | 16 | Carlaw Park | Auckland | 18,000 | Trans-Tasman series |
| 9 July 1983 | Australia | 19 | 12 | Lang Park | Brisbane | 15,000 | Trans-Tasman series |
| 1983 | Papua New Guinea | 60 | 20 | Carlaw Park | Auckland | Unknown | Friendly |
| 1984 | Great Britain | 12 | 0 | Carlaw Park | Auckland | Unknown | 1984 Lions tour |
| 1984 | Great Britain | 29 | 12 | Rugby League Park | Christchurch | Unknown | 1984 Lions tour |
| 1984 | Great Britain | 32 | 16 | Carlaw Park | Auckland | Unknown | 1984 Lions tour |
| 18 June 1985 | Australia | 20 | 26 | Lang Park | Brisbane | 22,000 | 1985 Kangaroo tour |
| 30 June 1985 | Australia | 6 | 10 | Carlaw Park | Auckland | 19,132 | 1985 Kangaroo tour |
| 7 July 1985 | Australia | 18 | 0 | Carlaw Park | Auckland | 15,327 | 1985–1988 World Cup |
| 19 October 1985 | Great Britain | 24 | 22 | Headingley | Leeds | 12 591 | 1985 Kiwi tour |
| 2 November 1985 | Great Britain | 8 | 25 | Central Park | Wigan | 15 506 | 1985 Kiwi tour |
| 9 November 1985 | Great Britain | 6 | 6 | Elland Road | Leeds | 22,209 | 1985 Kiwi tour |
| 24 November 1985 | France | 22 | 0 | Stade Vélodrome | Marseille | 1,492 | 1985 Kiwi tour |
| 7 December 1985 | France | 22 | 0 | Stade Gilbert Brutus | Perpignan | 5,000 | 1985–1988 World Cup |
| 6 July 1986 | Australia | 8 | 22 | Carlaw Park | Auckland | 14,566 | 1986 Kiwi tour |
| 19 July 1986 | Australia | 12 | 29 | Sydney Cricket Ground | Sydney | 34,302 | 1986 Kiwi tour |
| 29 July 1986 | Australia | 12 | 32 | Lang Park | Brisbane | 22,811 | 1985–1988 World Cup |
| 1986 | Papua New Guinea | 36 | 26 | PNG Football Stadium | Port Moresby | Unknown | 1986 Kiwi tour |
| 17 August 1986 | Papua New Guinea | 22 | 24 | PNG Football Stadium | Port Moresby | 15,000 | 1985–1988 World Cup |
| 1986 | Great Britain | 10 | 12 | Rugby League Park | Christchurch | Unknown | 1986 Lions tour |
| 28 June 1987 | Australia | 13 | 6 | Lang Park | Brisbane | 16,500 | 1987 Kiwi tour |
| 1987 | Papua New Guinea | 36 | 22 | PNG Football Stadium | Port Moresby | Unknown | 1987 Kiwi tour |
| 1987 | France | W/O | F | N/A | N/A | N/A | 1985–1988 World Cup |
| 10 July 1988 | Papua New Guinea | 66 | 14 | Carlaw Park | Auckland | 8,392 | 1985–1988 World Cup |
| 17 July 1988 | Great Britain | 12 | 10 | Rugby League Park | Auckland | 8,525 | 1985–1988 World Cup |
| 9 October 1988 | Australia | 12 | 25 | Eden Park | Auckland | 47,363 | 1988 World Cup Final |
| 10 July 1989 | Australia | 6 | 26 | Queen Elizabeth II Park | Christchurch | 17,000 | 1989 Kangaroo tour |
| 16 July 1989 | Australia | 0 | 8 | Rotorua International Stadium | Rotorua | 26,000 | 1989 Kangaroo tour |
| 23 July 1989 | Australia | 14 | 22 | Mount Smart Stadium | Auckland | 15,000 | 1989–1992 World Cup |
| 21 October 1989 | Great Britain | 6 | 10 | Old Trafford | Manchester | 18 273 | 1989 Kiwi tour |
| Oct 28 1989 | Great Britain | 6 | 26 | Elland Road | Leeds | 13 000 | 1989 Kiwi tour |
| 11 November 1989 | Great Britain | 10 | 6 | Central Park | Wigan | 20,346 | 1989–1992 World Cup |
| 19 November 1989 | France | 16 | 14 | Stade Albert Domec | Carcassonne | 3,500 | 1989 Kiwi tour |
| 7 December 1989 | France | 34 | 0 | Stade Albert Domec | Carcassonne | 4,208 | 1989–1992 World Cup |

=== 1990s ===
| Date | Opponent | F | A | Venue | City | Crowd | Competition |
|---|---|---|---|---|---|---|---|
| 1990 | Great Britain | 21 | 18 | Arena Manawatu | Palmerston North | Unknown | 1990 Lions tour |
| 1990 | Great Britain | 14 | 16 | Carlaw Park | Auckland | Unknown | 1990 Lions tour |
| 15 July 1990 | Great Britain | 21 | 18 | Queen Elizabeth II Park | Christchurch | 3,133 | 1989–1992 World Cup |
| 1990 | Papua New Guinea | 36 | 4 | Danny Leahy Oval | Goroka | Unknown | Friendly |
| 11 August 1990 | Papua New Guinea | 18 | 10 | PNG Football Stadium | Port Moresby | 7,837 | 1989–1992 World Cup |
| 19 August 1990 | Australia | 6 | 24 | Athletic Park | Wellington | 25,000 | Friendly |
| 13 June 1991 | France | 60 | 6 | Carlaw Park | Auckland | 7,000 | 1991 France tour |
| 23 June 1991 | France | 32 | 10 | Rugby League Park | Christchurch | 2,000 | 1989–1992 World Cup |
| 3 July 1991 | Australia | 24 | 8 | Olympic Park Stadium | Melbourne | 26,900 | 1991 Trans-Tasman Test series |
| 24 July 1991 | Australia | 0 | 44 | Sydney Football Stadium | Sydney | 34,911 | 1991 Trans-Tasman Test series |
| 31 July 1991 | Australia | 12 | 40 | Lang Park | Brisbane | 29,139 | 1989–1992 World Cup |
| 1992 | Great Britain | 15 | 14 | Arena Manawatu | Palmerston North | Unknown | 1992 Lions tour |
| 5 July 1992 | Papua New Guinea | 66 | 10 | Mount Smart Stadium | Auckland | 3,000 | 1989–1992 World Cup |
| 20 June 1993 | Australia | 14 | 14 | Mount Smart Stadium | Auckland | 22,994 | 1993 Trans-Tasman Test series |
| 25 June 1993 | Australia | 8 | 16 | Palmerston North Showgrounds | Palmerston North | 19,000 | 1993 Trans-Tasman Test series |
| 30 June 1993 | Australia | 4 | 16 | Lang Park | Brisbane | 31,000 | 1993 Trans-Tasman Test series |
| 3 October 1993 | Wales | 24 | 19 | Vetch Field | Swansea | 6,073 | 1993 Kiwi tour |
| 1993 | Great Britain | 0 | 17 | Empire Stadium | London | Unknown | 1993 Kiwi tour |
| 1993 | Great Britain | 12 | 29 | Central Park | Wigan | Unknown | 1993 Kiwi tour |
| 1993 | Great Britain | 10 | 29 | Elland Road | Leeds | Unknown | 1993 Kiwi tour |
| 21 November 1993 | France | 36 | 11 | Stade Albert Domec | Carcassonne | 3,500 | 1993 Kiwi tour |
| 1994 | Papua New Guinea | 28 | 12 | Danny Leahy Oval | Goroka | Unknown | Friendly |
| 1994 | Papua New Guinea | 30 | 16 | PNG Football Stadium | Port Moresby | Unknown | Friendly |
| 9 June 1995 | France | 22 | 6 | Mount Smart Stadium | Auckland | 15,000 | 1995 France tour |
| 16 June 1995 | France | 16 | 16 | Arena Manawatu | Palmerston North | 10,846 | 1995 France tour |
| 23 June 1995 | Australia | 8 | 26 | Lang Park | Brisbane | 25,304 | 1995 Trans-Tasman Test series |
| 7 July 1995 | Australia | 10 | 20 | Sydney Football Stadium | Sydney | 27,568 | 1995 Trans-Tasman Test series |
| 14 July 1995 | Australia | 10 | 46 | Lang Park | Brisbane | 20,803 | 1995 Trans-Tasman Test series |
| 8 October 1995 | Tonga | 25 | 24 | Wilderspool Stadium | Warrington | 8,083 | 1995 World Cup |
| 13 October 1995 | Papua New Guinea | 22 | 6 | Knowsley Road | St Helens | 8,679 | 1995 World Cup |
| 22 October 1995 | Australia | 20 | 30 | Kirklees Stadium | Huddersfield | 16,608 | 1995 World Cup |
| 22 October 1995 | Australia | (aet) | | Kirklees Stadium | Huddersfield | 16,608 | 1995 World Cup |
| 1996 | Papua New Guinea | 62 | 8 | Rotorua International Stadium | Rotorua | Unknown | Friendly |
| 1996 | Papua New Guinea | 64 | 0 | Arena Manawatu | Palmerston North | Unknown | Friendly |
| 1996 | Great Britain | 17 | 12 | Mount Smart Stadium | Auckland | Unknown | 1996 Lions tour |
| 1996 | Great Britain | 18 | 15 | Arena Manawatu | Palmerston North | Unknown | 1996 Lions tour |
| 1996 | Great Britain | 32 | 12 | Lancaster Park | Christchurch | Unknown | 1996 Lions tour |
| 25 April 1997 | Australia | 22 | 34 | Sydney Football Stadium | Sydney | 23,829 | 1997 Anzac Test |
| 26 September 1997 | Australia | 30 | 12 | North Harbour Stadium | Auckland | 17,500 | Friendly |
| 24 April 1998 | Australia | 22 | 16 | North Harbour Stadium | Auckland | 24,640 | 1998 Anzac Test |
| 9 October 1998 | Australia | 12 | 30 | Lang Park | Brisbane | 18,571 | Friendly |
| 16 October 1998 | Australia | 16 | 36 | North Harbour Stadium | Auckland | 24,620 | Friendly |
| 1998 | Great Britain | 22 | 16 | Kirklees Stadium | Huddersfield | Unknown | 1998 Kiwi tour |
| 1998 | Great Britain | 36 | 16 | Reebok Stadium | Bolton | Unknown | 1998 Kiwi tour |
| 1998 | Great Britain | 23 | 23 | Vicarage Road | Watford | Unknown | 1998 Kiwi tour |
| 23 April 1999 | Australia | 14 | 20 | Stadium Australia | Sydney | 30,245 | 1999 Anzac Test |
| 15 October 1999 | Australia | 18 | 16 | Mount Smart Stadium | Auckland | 22,540 | 1999 Tri-Nations |
| 22 October 1999 | Tonga | 74 | 0 | Carlaw Park | Auckland | 4,528 | Friendly |
| 26 October 1999 | Great Britain | 26 | 4 | Mount Smart Stadium | Auckland | 14,040 | 1999 Tri-Nations |
| 5 November 1999 | Australia | 20 | 22 | Mount Smart Stadium | Auckland | 21,204 | 1999 Tri-Nations |

=== 2000s ===
| Date | Opponent | F | A | Venue | City | Crowd | Competition |
|---|---|---|---|---|---|---|---|
| 21 April 2000 | Australia | 0 | 52 | Stadium Australia | Sydney | 26,023 | 2000 Anzac Test |
| 29 October 2000 | Lebanon | 64 | 0 | Kingsholm Stadium | Gloucester | 2,496 | 2000 World Cup |
| 2 November 2000 | Cook Islands | 84 | 10 | Madejski Stadium | Reading | 3,982 | 2000 World Cup |
| 5 November 2000 | Wales | 58 | 18 | Millennium Stadium | Cardiff | 17,612 | 2000 World Cup |
| 12 November 2000 | France | 54 | 6 | The Jungle | Castleford | 5,158 | 2000 World Cup |
| 18 November 2000 | England | 49 | 6 | Reebok Stadium | Bolton | 16,032 | 2000 World Cup |
| 25 November 2000 | Australia | 40 | 12 | Old Trafford | Manchester | 44,329 | 2000 World Cup |
| 10 June 2001 | France | 36 | 0 | Mount Smart Stadium | Auckland | 4,500 | 2001 France tour |
| 13 July 2001 | Australia | 10 | 28 | Wellington Regional Stadium | Wellington | 26,580 | Friendly |
| 12 October 2002 | Australia | 24 | 32 | Wellington Regional Stadium | Wellington | 25,015 | Pre-tour Friendly |
| 22 October 2002 | Hull F.C. | 28 | 11 | The Boulevard | Kingston-upon-Hull | 12,092 | 2002 Kiwi tour |
| 25 October 2002 | St Helens | 38 | 26 | Knowsley Road | St Helens | Unknown | 2002 Kiwi tour |
| 30 October 2002 | England Reserves | 34 | 12 | Griffin Park | London | Unknown | 2002 Kiwi tour |
| 3 November 2002 | Wales | 50 | 22 | Millennium Stadium | Cardiff | 8,746 | 2002 Kiwi tour |
| 9 November 2002 | Great Britain | 30 | 16 | Ewood Park | Blackburn | 16,654 | 2002 Kiwi tour |
| 16 November 2002 | Great Britain | 16 | 16 | Kirklees Stadium | Huddersfield | 23,604 | 2002 Kiwi tour |
| 23 November 2002 | Great Britain | 10 | 16 | JJB Stadium | Wigan | 22,247 | 2002 Kiwi tour |
| 30 November 2002 | France | 36 | 10 | Stade Aimé Giral | Perpignan | 6,500 | 2002 Kiwi tour |
| 25 July 2003 | Australia | 6 | 38 | Sydney Football Stadium | Sydney | 30,605 | Friendly |
| 18 October 2003 | Australia | 30 | 16 | North Harbour Stadium | Auckland | 21,926 | Friendly |
| 23 April 2004 | Australia | 10 | 37 | Newcastle Sports Centre | Newcastle | 21,537 | 2004 Anzac Test |
| 16 October 2004 | Australia | 16 | 16 | North Harbour Stadium | Auckland | 19,118 | 2004 Tri-Nations |
| 23 October 2004 | Australia | 12 | 32 | Loftus Road | London | 16,725 | 2004 Tri-Nations |
| 6 November 2004 | Great Britain | 12 | 22 | Kirklees Stadium | Huddersfield | 20,372 | 2004 Tri-Nations |
| 11 November 2004 | France | 24 | 20 | Stade Albert Domec | Carcassonne | 8,000 | Friendly |
| 20 November 2004 | Great Britain | 24 | 26 | KC Stadium | Kingston-upon-Hull | 23,377 | 2004 Tri-Nations |
| 22 April 2005 | Australia | 16 | 32 | Lang Park | Brisbane | 40,317 | 2005 Anzac Test |
| 15 October 2005 | Australia | 38 | 28 | Stadium Australia | Sydney | 28,255 | 2005 Tri-Nations |
| 21 October 2005 | Australia | 26 | 28 | Mount Smart Stadium | Auckland | 15,400 | 2005 Tri-Nations |
| 29 October 2005 | Great Britain | 24 | 26 | Loftus Road | London | 15,568 | 2005 Tri-Nations |
| 6 November 2005 | England | 30 | 22 | Halliwell Jones Stadium | Warrington | 7,298 | Friendly |
| 12 November 2005 | Great Britain | 12 | 38 | Kirklees Stadium | Huddersfield | 19,232 | 2005 Tri-Nations |
| 18 November 2005 | France | 38 | 22 | Stadium de Toulouse | Toulouse | 8,013 | Friendly |
| 26 November 2005 | Australia | 24 | 0 | Elland Road | Leeds | 26,534 | 2005 Tri-Nations |
| 5 May 2006 | Australia | 12 | 50 | Lang Park | Brisbane | 44,191 | 2006 Anzac Test |
| 28 June 2006 | Great Britain | 14 | 46 | Knowsley Road | St Helens | 10,103 | Friendly |
| 14 October 2006 | Australia | 18 | 30 | Mount Smart Stadium | Auckland | 20,000 | 2006 Tri-Nations |
| 21 October 2006 | Australia | 15 | 20 | Docklands Stadium | Melbourne | 30,732 | 2006 Tri-Nations |
| 28 October 2006 | Great Britain | 18 | 14 | Lancaster Park | Christchurch | 17,005 | 2006 Tri-Nations |
| 11 November 2006 | Great Britain | 34 | 4 | Wellington Regional Stadium | Wellington | 16,401 | 2006 Tri-Nations |
| 25 November 2006 | Australia | 16 | 12 | Sydney Football Stadium | Brisbane | 27,325 | 2006 Tri-Nations |
| 25 November 2006 | Australia | (g.p.) | | Sydney Football Stadium | Brisbane | 27,325 | 2006 Tri-Nations |
| 20 April 2007 | Australia | 6 | 30 | Lang Park | Brisbane | 35,241 | 2007 Anzac Test |
| 13 October 2007 | Australia | 0 | 58 | Wellington Regional Stadium | Wellington | 16,681 | Pre-tour Friendly |
| 27 October 2007 | Great Britain | 14 | 20 | Kirklees Stadium | Huddersfield | 16,522 | 2007 All Golds Tour |
| 3 November 2007 | Great Britain | 0 | 44 | KC Stadium | Kingston-upon-Hull | 20,324 | 2007 All Golds Tour |
| 10 November 2007 | Great Britain | 22 | 28 | JJB Stadium | Wigan | 21,235 | 2007 All Golds Tour |
| 17 November 2007 | France | 22 | 14 | Stade Jean-Bouin | Paris | 6,781 | 2007 All Golds Tour |
| 9 May 2008 | Australia | 12 | 28 | Sydney Cricket Ground | Sydney | 34,571 | 2008 Anzac Test |
| 18 October 2008 | Tonga | 58 | 8 | Mount Smart Stadium | Auckland | Unknown | Friendly |
| 26 October 2008 | Australia | 6 | 30 | Sydney Football Stadium | Sydney | 34,157 | 2008 World Cup |
| 1 November 2008 | Papua New Guinea | 48 | 6 | Robina Stadium | Gold Coast | 11,278 | 2008 World Cup |
| 8 November 2008 | England | 36 | 24 | Newcastle International Sports Centre | Newcastle | 15,145 | 2008 World Cup |
| 15 November 2008 | England | 32 | 22 | Lang Park | Brisbane | 26,659 | 2008 World Cup |
| 22 November 2008 | Australia | 34 | 20 | Lang Park | Brisbane | 50,599 | 2008 World Cup |
| 8 May 2009 | Australia | 10 | 38 | Lang Park | Brisbane | 37,152 | 2009 Anzac Test |
| 14 October 2009 | Tonga | 40 | 24 | Rotorua International Stadium | Rotorua | 8,000 | Friendly |
| 24 October 2009 | Australia | 20 | 20 | Twickenham Stoop | London | 12,360 | 2009 Four Nations |
| 31 October 2009 | France | 62 | 12 | Stade Ernest-Wallon | Toulouse | 12,412 | 2009 Four Nations |
| 7 November 2009 | England | 12 | 20 | Kirklees Stadium | Huddersfield | 19,390 | 2009 Four Nations |

=== 2010s ===
| Date | Opponent | F | A | Venue | City | Crowd | Competition |
|---|---|---|---|---|---|---|---|
| 7 May 2010 | Australia | 8 | 12 | Melbourne Rectangular Stadium | Melbourne | 29,442 | 2010 Anzac Test |
| 16 October 2010 | Samoa | 50 | 6 | Mount Smart Stadium | Auckland | 11,512 | Friendly |
| 23 October 2010 | England | 24 | 10 | Wellington Regional Stadium | Wellington | 20,681 | 2010 Four Nations |
| 30 October 2010 | Papua New Guinea | 76 | 12 | Rotorua International Stadium | Rotorua | 6,000 | 2010 Four Nations |
| 6 November 2010 | Australia | 20 | 34 | Eden Park | Auckland | 44,324 | 2010 Four Nations |
| 13 November 2010 | Australia | 16 | 12 | Lang Park | Brisbane | 36,299 | 2010 Four Nations |
| 6 May 2011 | Australia | 10 | 20 | Robina Stadium | Gold Coast | 26,301 | 2011 Anzac Test |
| 16 October 2011 | Australia | 6 | 42 | Newcastle Sports Centre | Newcastle | 32,890 | Friendly |
| 28 October 2011 | Australia | 12 | 26 | Halliwell Jones Stadium | Warrington | 12,491 | 2011 Four Nations |
| 5 November 2011 | Wales | 36 | 0 | Wembley Stadium | London | 42,344 | 2011 Four Nations |
| 12 November 2011 | England | 6 | 28 | KC Stadium | Kingston-upon-Hull | 23,447 | 2011 Four Nations |
| 20 April 2012 | Australia | 12 | 20 | Eden Park | Auckland | 35,339 | 2012 Anzac Test |
| 13 October 2012 | Australia | 10 | 18 | Willows Sports Complex | Townsville | 26,497 | Friendly |
| 19 April 2013 | Australia | 12 | 32 | Canberra Stadium | Canberra | 25,628 | 2013 Anzac Test |
| 20 October 2013 | Cook Islands | 50 | 0 | Keepmoat Stadium | Doncaster | Unknown | Friendly |
| 27 October 2013 | Samoa | 42 | 24 | Halliwell Jones Stadium | Warrington | 14,965 | 2013 World Cup |
| 1 November 2013 | France | 48 | 0 | Parc des Sports | Avignon | 17,518 | 2013 World Cup |
| 8 November 2013 | Papua New Guinea | 56 | 10 | Headingley | Leeds | 18,180 | 2013 World Cup |
| 15 November 2013 | Scotland | 40 | 4 | Headingley | Leeds | 16,207 | 2013 World Cup |
| 23 November 2013 | England | 20 | 18 | Wembley Stadium | London | 67,545 | 2013 World Cup |
| 30 November 2013 | Australia | 2 | 34 | Old Trafford | Manchester | 74,468 | 2013 World Cup |
| 2 May 2014 | Australia | 18 | 30 | Sydney Football Stadium | Sydney | 25,429 | 2014 Anzac Test |
| 25 October 2014 | Australia | 30 | 12 | Lang Park | Brisbane | 47,813 | 2014 Four Nations |
| 1 November 2014 | Samoa | 14 | 12 | Okara Park | Whangārei | 16,912 | 2014 Four Nations |
| 8 November 2014 | England | 16 | 14 | Forsyth Barr Stadium | Dunedin | 15,863 | 2014 Four Nations |
| 20 November 2014 | Australia | 22 | 18 | Wellington Regional Stadium | Wellington | 25,093 | 2014 Four Nations |
| 3 May 2015 | Australia | 26 | 12 | Lang Park | Brisbane | 32,681 | 2015 Anzac Test |
| 23 October 2015 | Leeds Rhinos | 34 | 16 | Headingley | Leeds | 20,158 | 2015 Kiwi tour |
| 1 November 2015 | England | 12 | 28 | KC Stadium | Kingston-upon-Hull | 23,526 | 2015 Kiwi tour |
| 7 November 2015 | England | 9 | 2 | Olympic Park | London | 44,393 | 2015 Kiwi tour |
| 14 November 2015 | England | 14 | 20 | DW Stadium | Wigan | 24,741 | 2015 Kiwi tour |
| 6 May 2016 | Australia | 0 | 16 | Newcastle International Sports Centre | Newcastle | 27,724 | 2016 Anzac Test |
| 15 October 2016 | Australia | 6 | 26 | Perth Oval | Perth | 20,283 | Friendly |
| 29 October 2016 | England | 17 | 16 | Kirklees Stadium | Huddersfield | 24,070 | 2016 Four Nations |
| 5 November 2016 | Australia | 8 | 14 | Ricoh Arena | Coventry | 21,009 | 2016 Four Nations |
| 11 November 2016 | Scotland | 16 | 16 | Derwent Park | Workington | 6,628 | 2016 Four Nations |
| 20 November 2016 | Australia | 8 | 34 | Anfield | Liverpool | 40,042 | 2016 Four Nations |
| 5 May 2017 | Australia | 12 | 30 | Canberra Stadium | Canberra | 18,535 | 2017 Anzac Test |
| 28 October 2017 | Samoa | 38 | 8 | Mount Smart Stadium | Auckland | 17,857 | 2017 World Cup |
| 4 November 2017 | Scotland | 74 | 6 | Rugby League Park | Christchurch | 12,130 | 2017 World Cup |
| 11 November 2017 | Tonga | 22 | 28 | Waikato Stadium | Hamilton | 24,041 | 2017 World Cup |
| 18 November 2017 | Fiji | 2 | 4 | Wellington Regional Stadium | Wellington | 12,713 | 2017 World Cup |
| 23 June 2018 | England | 18 | 26 | Mile High Stadium | Denver | 19,320 | Friendly |
| 13 October 2018 | Australia | 26 | 24 | Mount Smart Stadium | Auckland | 12,763 | Friendly |
| 27 October 2018 | England | 16 | 18 | KCOM Stadium | Kingston-upon-Hull | 17,649 | 2018 Kiwi tour |
| 4 November 2018 | England | 14 | 20 | Anfield | Liverpool | 26,234 | 2018 Kiwi tour |
| 11 November 2018 | England | 34 | 0 | Elland Road | Leeds | 32,186 | 2018 Kiwi tour |
| 22 June 2019 | Tonga | 34 | 14 | Mount Smart Stadium | Auckland | 23,624 | 2019 Oceania Cup |
| 26 October 2019 | Australia | 4 | 26 | Wollongong Showground | Wollongong | 18,104 | 2019 Oceania Cup |
| 2 November 2019 | Great Britain | 12 | 8 | Eden Park | Auckland | 25,575 | 2019 Lions tour |
| 9 November 2019 | Great Britain | 23 | 8 | Rugby League Park | Christchurch | 8,875 | 2019 Lions tour |

=== 2020s ===
| Date | Opponent | F | A | Venue | City | Crowd | Competition |
|---|---|---|---|---|---|---|---|
| 25 May 2022 | Tonga | 26 | 6 | Mount Smart Stadium | Auckland | 20,766 | Friendly |
| 8 October 2022 | Leeds Rhinos | 74 | 0 | Headingley | Leeds | 9,125 | Friendly |
| 16 October 2022 | Lebanon | 34 | 12 | Halliwell Jones Stadium | Warrington | 5,453 | 2021 World Cup |
| 22 October 2022 | Jamaica | 68 | 6 | MKM Stadium | Kingston-upon-Hull | 6,829 | 2021 World Cup |
| 28 October 2022 | Ireland | 24 | 18 | Headingley | Leeds | 7,080 | 2021 World Cup |
| 5 November 2022 | Fiji | 24 | 18 | MKM Stadium | Kingston-upon-Hull | 5,453 | 2021 World Cup |
| 11 November 2022 | Australia | 14 | 16 | Elland Road | Leeds | 28,113 | 2021 World Cup |
| 21 October 2023 | Samoa | 50 | 0 | Eden Park | Auckland | 23,269 | 2023 Pacific Cup |
| 28 October 2023 | Australia | 18 | 36 | Melbourne Rectangular Stadium | Melbourne | 20,584 | 2023 Pacific Cup |
| 4 November 2023 | Australia | 30 | 0 | Waikato Stadium | Hamilton | 13,269 | 2023 Pacific Cup |
| 27 October 2024 | Australia | 10 | 22 | Rugby League Park | Christchurch | 17,005 | 2024 Pacific Cup |
| 2 November 2024 | Tonga | 24 | 25 | Mount Smart Stadium | Auckland | 22,363 | 2024 Pacific Cup |
| 10 November 2024 | Papua New Guinea | 54 | 12 | Western Sydney Stadium | Sydney | Unknown | 2024 Pacific Cup |
| 19 October 2025 | Samoa | 24 | 18 | Mount Smart Stadium | Auckland | 21,251 | 2025 Pacific Cup |
| 2 November 2025 | Tonga | 40 | 14 | Eden Park | Auckland | 38,114 | 2025 Pacific Cup |
| 9 November 2025 | Samoa | 36 | 14 | Western Sydney Stadium | Sydney | 28,084 | 2025 Pacific Cup |
| 15 October 2026 | Australia | 22 | 24 | Sydney Football Stadium | Sydney | 41,255 | 2026 World Cup |
| 25 October 2026 | Cook Islands | 82 | 16 | Te Kaha | Christchurch | 24,868 | 2026 World Cup |
| 31 October 2026 | Fiji | 78 | 0 | Robina Stadium | Gold Coast | 23,659 | 2026 World Cup |
| 7 November 2026 | Tonga | 34 | 10 | Newcastle International Sports Centre | Newcastle | 29,712 | 2026 World Cup |
| 15 November 2026 | Australia | 12 | 32 | Lang Park | Brisbane | 52,461 | 2026 World Cup |
| October / November 2027 | England | | | | | | 2027 Kiwi tour |
| October / November 2027 | England | | | | | | 2027 Kiwi tour |
| October / November 2027 | England | | | | | | 2027 Kiwi tour |

== See also ==
- New Zealand national rugby league team
- Rugby League World Cup
- New Zealand Rugby League
