= James Tamou =

Australia international rugby league footballer

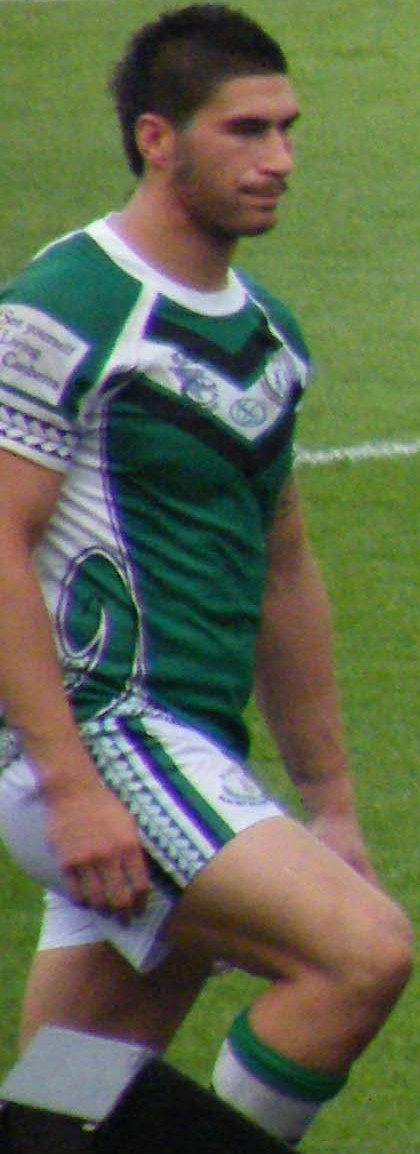

Personal information
- Full name: James Tamou
- Born: 13 December 1988 (age 37) Palmerston North, New Zealand

Playing information
- Height: 195 cm (6 ft 5 in)
- Weight: 115 kg (18 st 2 lb)
- Position: Prop
Club
Years	Team	Pld	T	G	FG	P
2009–16	North Qld Cowboys	170	12	0	0	48
2017–20	Penrith Panthers	97	10	0	0	40
2021–22	Wests Tigers	38	4	0	0	16
2023	North Qld Cowboys	2	1	0	0	4
	Total	307	27	0	0	108
Representative
Years	Team	Pld	T	G	FG	P
2008–10	New Zealand Māori	2	0	0	0	0
2012–16	Australia	12	2	0	0	8
2012–16	New South Wales	14	0	0	0	0
2013	NRL All Stars	1	0	0	0	0
2013	Prime Minister's XIII	1	0	0	0	0
2017	NSW City	1	1	0	0	4
2019	Māori All Stars	1	0	0	0	0
- Relatives: Kenny Edwards (cousin)

James Tamou (born 13 December 1988) is a former professional rugby league footballer who plays as a prop for the Townsville Blackhawks in the Queensland Cup.

Tamou spent two stints in the National Rugby League (NRL) with the North Queensland Cowboys, with whom he won the 2015 NRL Grand Final. He also played for the Penrith Panthers, who he captained to the 2020 NRL Grand Final, and the Wests Tigers. He played at representative level for Australia, New South Wales, the New Zealand Māori, NSW City, and the NRL All Stars.

== Background ==
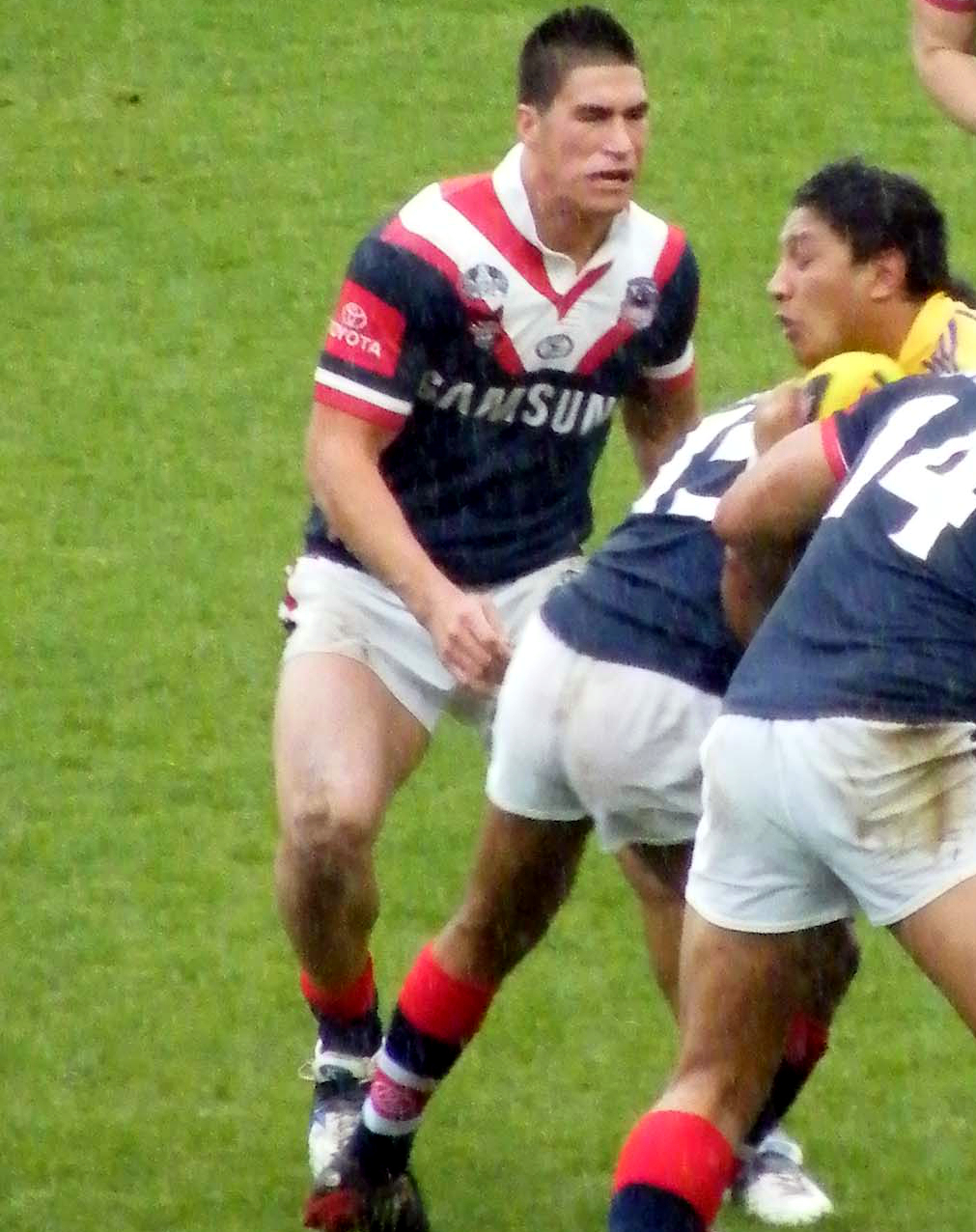
Tamou in action for the Sydney Roosters NYC side against Parramatta in 2008

Tamou was born in Palmerston North, New Zealand. He is of Māori (Muaūpoko) and (Ngā Rauru) and is also of Danish descent.

He began playing junior rugby league in Levin for the Levin Knights in New Zealand. At the age of 13, Tamou moved with his family to Australia. He then played his junior rugby league for the Paddington Tigers and attended Matraville Sports High School in Sydney's Eastern Suburbs.

== Playing career ==
In 2007, he was the Sydney Roosters Jersey Flegg Cup Player of the Year and was selected to play for the Junior Kiwis. Tamou played for the Roosters' NYC team in 2008 and was one of the club's best performers, before signing for the North Queensland Cowboys for the 2009 season.

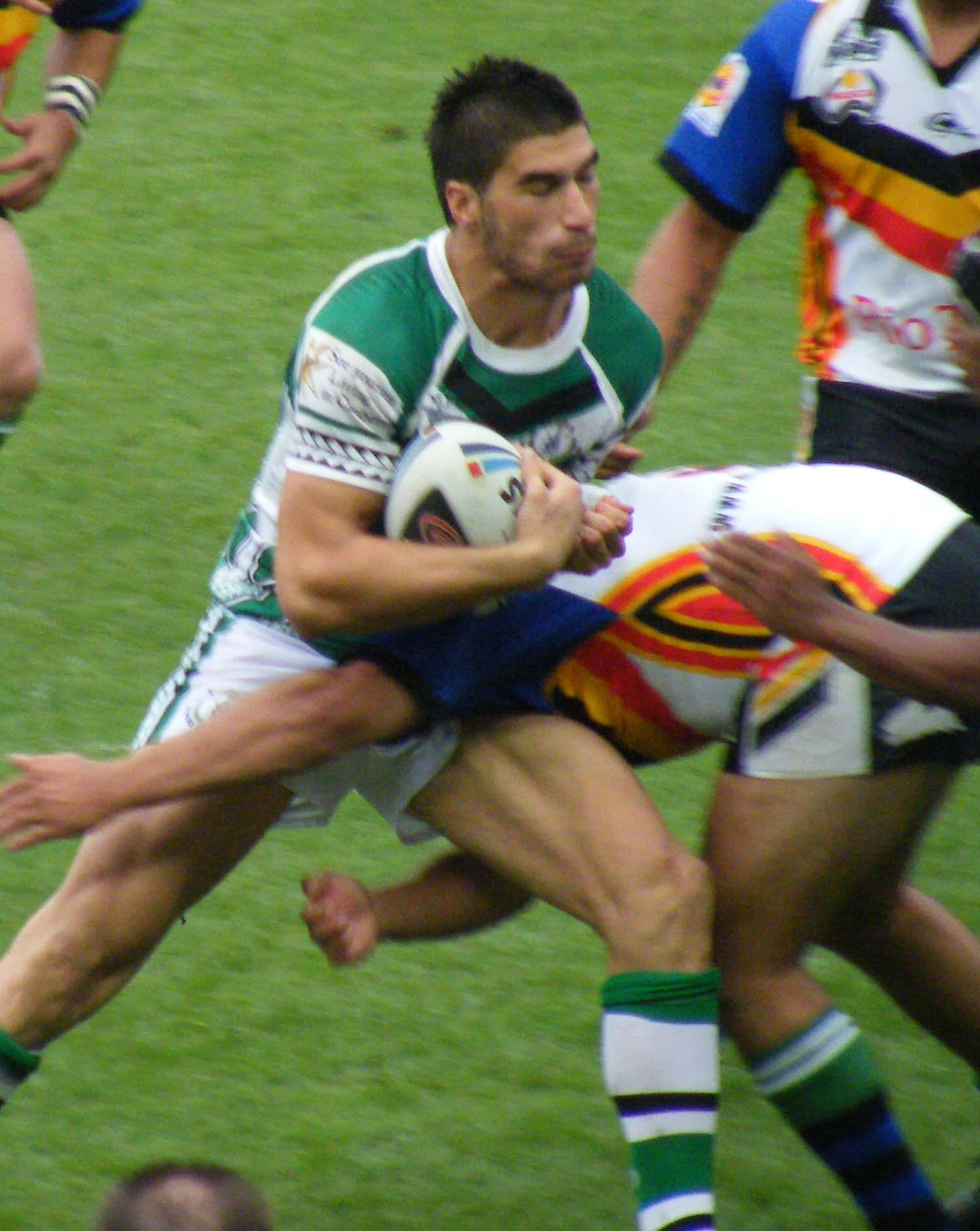
Tamou playing for the New Zealand Māori in 2008

In 2008, he represented New Zealand Maori, when they played Indigenous Dreamtime team in the 2008 World Cup curtain raiser, playing off the interchange bench in the 34–26 loss at Sydney Football Stadium.

=== 2009 ===
In round 8, Tamou made his NRL debut against the Parramatta Eels where he played off the interchange bench and scored a try in North Queensland's 18–28 loss at Parramatta Stadium. He finished his debut year in the NRL with 12 matches and two tries.

=== 2010 ===
In 2010, Tamou was named the North Queensland club's most improved player of the year, after playing in 19 matches and scoring a try. His good form was rewarded that year, when he re-signed with North Queensland for a further three years. On 16 October, Tamou once again represented New Zealand Māori when they faced England before the start of the 2010 Four Nations tournament.

=== 2011 ===
On 12 April, Tamou and teammate Blake Leary were suspended by the North Queensland club for one game for "breaking team alcohol rules". Tamou later played a major part in North Queensland's surge to the finals, finishing the season with him playing in 23 matches and scoring two tries. He averaged 108 metres per game. In September, Tamou was selected in New Zealand's train-on squad for the Four Nations, although he was not selected in the final squad.

=== 2012 ===
In April, despite just weeks earlier expressing his desire to represent New Zealand, Tamou pledged his allegiance to Australia and New South Wales. Tamou had received phone calls from then New South Wales coach Ricky Stuart and captain Paul Gallen about making the switch. On 20 April, Tamou made his Australian international in the Anzac Test, playing off the interchange bench in the 20–12 win at Eden Park. On 22 May, Tamou made his State of Origin debut for New South Wales, starting at prop in the Blues 10–18 loss at Docklands Stadium in Melbourne. Tamou played in all three games of the series.

The 2012 NRL season was a breakout year for Tamou, playing in 24 matches and scoring two tries as well as averaging more metres per game than any other prop in the NRL. On 13 October, Tamou played for Australia in the trans-Tasman test, where he started at prop and scored a try in the 18–10 victory. On 10 December, Tamou re-signed with the Cowboys, keeping him at the club to the end of the 2016 season.

=== 2013 ===
On 19 April, Tamou was selected for Australia in the Anzac Test, starting at prop in the 32–12 win at Canberra Stadium in what was the first test match ever played in Canberra. In game 1 of the 2013 State of Origin series, Tamou was selected for New South Wales and started at prop in a 14–6 victory over Queensland at ANZ Stadium. Less than a week later, Tamou was fined $20,000 by the NRL and suspended for two NRL matches for drink driving and driving unlicensed in Townsville on 11 June. He was suspended for the second Origin match. Tamou returned in game 3, where New South Wales lost 12–10, resulting in Queensland winning the series 2–1.

In the club's elimination final match against the Cronulla-Sutherland Sharks, Tamou played his 100th NRL match in the 20–18 loss at Sydney Football Stadium. Tamou finished the year with 22 appearances for North Queensland. In October, he played for Australia in the World Cup, playing in 6 matches and scoring a try in the tournament. Tamou started at prop in the Kangaroos 34–2 World Cup Final victory over New Zealand at Old Trafford in Manchester.

=== 2014 ===
In February, Tamou was a member of North Queensland's victorious Auckland Nines side and was named in the Team of the Tournament. On 2 May, Tamou played in the 2014 Anzac Test against New Zealand, playing off the interchange bench in the 30–18 win. For the 2014 State of Origin series, Tamou played in all 3 matches in the Blues 2–1 series win, resulting in New South Wales winning its first series win since the 2005. In round 20, against the Canterbury-Bankstown Bulldogs, Tamou injured his neck, resulting with him being sidelined for a month. He returned in round 24. Tamou finished the season with him playing in 21 matches and scoring one try. He underwent neck surgery at the end of the season, ruling him out of Australia's Four Nations campaign.

=== 2015 ===
Early into the season, rumours were floating around about Tamou was going to offloaded from North Queensland to the Canberra Raiders after his bad performances in the Cowboys first 3 losses off the season, but later on Tamou returned to his best form when North Queensland went on their 11 match winning streak. On 3 May, Tamou played in the Anzac Test, playing off the interchange bench in the 12–26 loss. In the 2015 State of Origin series, Tamou played in all three matches, starting at prop for the Blues in their 2–1 series loss. On 4 October, Tamou was a member of North Queensland's 2015 NRL Grand Final winning side, starting at prop and scoring a try in the side's 17–16 victory over the Brisbane Broncos. Tamou finished his successful year with him playing in 24 matches and scoring two tries.

=== 2016 ===
On 2 February, Tamou played for North Queensland in the Auckland Nines. On 21 February 2016, Tamou was a member of the Cowboys' World Club Challenge winning side, starting at prop in the side's 38–4 victory over the Leeds Rhinos at Headingley Stadium. On 6 May 2016, Tamou played for Australia against New Zealand, playing off the interchange bench in the 16–0 win at Hunter Stadium. On 16 June 2016, it was announced that Tamou had signed a four-year deal with the Penrith Panthers. In the 2016 State of Origin series, Tamou played in all 3 matches for New South Wales in their 2–1 series loss. Tamou finished his last year with the North Queensland Cowboys with him playing in 25 matches and scoring two tries in the 2016 NRL season.

=== 2017 ===
In February 2017, Tamou was named in Penrith's 2017 NRL Auckland Nines squad. In round 1 of the 2017 NRL season, Tamou made his club debut for the Penrith Panthers against the St George Illawarra Dragons, where he started at prop in the 10–42 loss at Jubilee Oval.

=== 2018 ===
In 2018, Tamou was not selected in the NSW Blues State of Origin squad for the second year in a row despite Penrith being on top of the table after 13 rounds and the player showing good form.

Tamou played a total of 25 games for Penrith in 2018 as the club qualified for the finals but were eliminated by Cronulla in week two of the finals series.

=== 2019 ===
Tamou made a total of 24 appearances for Penrith in the 2019 NRL season as the club finished a disappointing 10th place and missed out on the finals for the first time since 2015.

=== 2020 ===
Tamou played 22 games for Penrith in the 2020 NRL season as the club won the Minor Premiership and went on a 17-game unbeaten run to reach the 2020 NRL Grand Final. Tamou captained Penrith in the final where they lost to Melbourne 26–20. This would be Tamou's final game for the side as he had signed a contract to join the Wests Tigers in 2021.

=== 2021 ===
In round 1 of the 2021 NRL season, he made his debut for Wests Tigers in a 30–12 loss against Canberra. Tamou played a total of 19 games for the Wests Tigers in the 2021 NRL season as the club finished 13th and missed the finals.

=== 2022 ===
In round 23 of the 2022 NRL season, Tamou was sent off for dissent in Wests Tigers record 72–6 loss against the Sydney Roosters at the Sydney Cricket Ground. in the 2022 NRL season as the club finished bottom of the table and claimed the Wooden Spoon for the first time.

=== 2023 ===
Tamou signed a one-year deal to return to the North Queensland Cowboys for the 2023 NRL season, playing his first game off the bench in the side's round 1 win over the Canberra Raiders. Tamou's next appearance came in North Queensland's round 4 win over the Gold Coast Titans, where he scored a try but sustained a lisfranc injury and was sidelined for 21 weeks. On 17 August, Tamou announced he had played his final game for the North Queensland club and would retire effective immediately.

Tamou later signed with the Townsville Blackhawks for the 2024 Queensland Cup Season.

== Achievements and accolades ==
=== Individual ===
- North Queensland Cowboys Most Improved: 2010
- North Queensland Cowboys Players' Player: 2012

=== Team ===
- 2013 Rugby League World Cup: Australia - winners
- 2014 NRL Auckland Nines: North Queensland Cowboys – winners
- 2015 NRL Grand Final: North Queensland Cowboys – winners
- 2016 World Club Challenge: North Queensland Cowboys – winners

== Statistics ==
=== NRL ===
Statistics are correct to the end of round 10 in the 2023 season

†	Denotes seasons in which Tamou won a NRL Premiership.

Season	Team	Matches	T	G	GK %	F/G	Pts
2009	North Queensland Cowboys	12	2	0	—	0	8
2010	North Queensland Cowboys	19	1	0	—	0	4
2011	North Queensland Cowboys	23	2	0	—	0	8
2012	North Queensland Cowboys	24	2	0	—	0	8
2013	North Queensland Cowboys	22	0	0	—	0	0
2014	North Queensland Cowboys	21	1	0	—	0	4
2015†	North Queensland Cowboys	24	2	0	—	0	8
2016	North Queensland Cowboys	25	2	0	—	0	8
2017	Penrith Panthers	26	3	0		0	12
2018	Penrith Panthers	25	2	0		0	8
2019	Penrith Panthers	24	4	0		0	16
2020	Penrith Panthers	22	1	0		0	4
2021	Wests Tigers	19	2	0		0	8
2022	Wests Tigers	19	2	0		0	8
2023	North Queensland Cowboys	2	1				
Career totals		307	27	0	—	0	108

=== State of Origin ===
†	Denotes seasons in which Tamou won a State of Origin Series

Season	Team	Matches	T	G	GK %	F/G	Pts
2012	New South Wales	3	0	0	—	0	0
2013	New South Wales	2	0	0	—	0	0
2014†	New South Wales	3	0	0	—	0	0
2015	New South Wales	3	0	0	—	0	0
2016	New South Wales	3	0	0	—	0	0
Career totals		14	0	0	—	0	0

=== International ===
Season	Team	Matches	T	G	GK %	F/G	Pts
2012	Australia	2	1	0	—	0	4
2013	Australia	7	1	0	—	0	4
2014	Australia	1	0	0	—	0	0
2015	Australia	1	0	0	—	0	0
2016	Australia	1	0	0	—	0	0
Career totals		12	2	0	—	0	8

== Personal life ==
Tamou and his wife, Brittney Tamou, have five sons.

Tamou is the cousin of Huddersfield Giants player Kenny Edwards.
