= Anzac Test =

Former annual rugby league football test match

- Australia New Zealand
- Sport: Rugby league
- First meeting: 1997 Anzac Test
- Latest meeting: 2017 Anzac Test
- Broadcasters: Nine Network (Australia); Sky Sport (New Zealand)
- Trophy: Bill Kelly Memorial Trophy

Statistics
- Total meetings: 17 (men's), 3 (women's)
- All-time series: Australia leads, 15–2–0 (men); Australia leads, 2–1–0 (women)

The Anzac Test was an annual rugby league football test match played between Australia and New Zealand for the Bill Kelly Memorial Trophy.

The test series ran from 1997 and 2017. It was played annually with the exception of 2001 to 2003 and was played as mid-season international. In 2019, the Oceania Cup was founded, replacing the Anzac Test series, featuring a number of Pacific Island teams.

== History ==
=== Origins ===
Australia and New Zealand had competed in rugby league test matches since 1908. The Anzac Test, played on or around Anzac Day, was introduced by Super League (Australia) in 1997. When New Zealand was defeated 56–0 in 2000, the Australian Rugby League (ARL) was criticised for playing the match before the State of Origin series. The test was then dropped from the annual schedule in favour of match in mid-July. In 2002 and 2003, Australia defeated Great Britain (64–10) and New Zealand (48–6) in July test matches, so the test was revived the following year.

=== Naming controversy ===
The Anzac Test was controversial for its use of the term Anzac (Australian and New Zealand Army Corps) and its perceived comparison of professional sportsmen with soldiers. However Super League donated a large sum of money to the RSL, and national RSL President Bruce Ruxton featured in commercials for the inaugural Anzac Test, proclaiming

"Mark my words, Australia is still in grave danger from one of our so-called neighbours. The Kiwis were once our allies and now they're on the other side – at least for 80 minutes".

The word Anzac is protected in Australia by The Protection of Word "ANZAC" Regulations (under the War Precautions Act Repeal Act 1920) and requires permission of the Minister for Veterans' Affairs for use in commercial events. This permission was given for the event from 1997–1999.

From 2004 until 2008 the match was officially called the Bundaberg Rum League Test, after the principal sponsor, Bundaberg Rum. For the 2009 fixture, the principal sponsor was Victoria Bitter and, as such, the match was officially called the VB Test. Despite the official name change, it is still common for the match to be called the Anzac Test. In 2016 it was sponsored by the Downer Group.

=== Trophy ===
Two different trophies have been awarded for the winner of this Test. For the 1997–1999 Anzac Tests, the winner was awarded the Anzac Trophy, which depicted an Australian slouch hat and New Zealand lemon squeezer hat.

Since 2004, the winner of the Bundaberg Rum League Test has been awarded the Bill Kelly Memorial Trophy. This trophy was donated in 1996 by Gerald Ryan ONZM, a past president of the New Zealand Rugby League. It is named after Bill Kelly, a New Zealand rugby league player in the early 20th century.

The Bill Kelly Memorial Trophy was briefly stolen by three 25-year-old New Zealand men after Australia's victory in the 2006 Test. It was found several hours later on the awning of a nearby building.

=== Revival after 2008 World Cup ===
In 2007, the New Zealand Rugby League announced that the Anzac Test would not be contested after 2008, citing difficulties with selecting their best possible team for a match held at that time of year as a number of NZ players were based in the Super League which had switched to a summer season in 1996 and clubs were reluctant to release their players for a game on the other side of the world. According to the NZRL Director of Football, Graham Lowe, "We have an obligation to play Australia in Sydney on 9 May next year, because it is their centenary test, and we will fulfil it, but that will be the last one." Although the NZRL did not think that the Anzac Tests were still a viable option, they were "optimistic an international calendar will be adopted.".

After New Zealand's win in the 2008 Rugby League World Cup, the release of new RLIF World Rankings, and the introduction of a new international schedule, the annual mid-season test between Australia and New Zealand was revived. The 2009 fixture was played on 8 May at Brisbane's Suncorp Stadium.

The 2010 Anzac Test, played on 7 May, was the first game of football at Melbourne's newly constructed AAMI Park. The 2011 Anzac Test was scheduled to be held at AMI Stadium in Christchurch on 6 May. However, the match had to be rescheduled at Robina Stadium on Australia's Gold Coast due to the 2011 Christchurch earthquake. The 2012 Anzac Test was held at Eden Park, Auckland, on 20 April and was adjudicated by English Referee, Richard Silverwood. This was the first Anzac Test to be played in New Zealand since 1998.

The 2013 Test was held at the Canberra Stadium on 19 April. This marked the first time that the Australian team had played a test in Australia's capital city. The game was played in Canberra to celebrate the centenary of that city. The 2014 Anzac Test played at the Sydney Football Stadium on 2 May, saw test football return to Sydney for the first time since the 2010 Four Nations. The 2015 Anzac Test, played at Suncorp Stadium, was originally scheduled to take place on 1 May but bad weather caused the game to be postponed to 3 May. This marked the first time a rugby league Test in Australia was ever done so. The 2016 Anzac Test was played at Hunter Stadium on 6 May, the first time the match was played in Newcastle since 2004. The Kangaroos won the match 16–0.

=== Demise ===
In August 2015, the National Rugby League (NRL) announced a new $925 million TV deal. A key component of the deal was increased provisions promoting player welfare and satisfaction, shortening the NRL regular season from 26 weeks to 25. The traditional early-May representative weekend was removed from the calendar, with the Anzac Test disbanded. Australia-New Zealand tests and other international series will be given "new priority" in a dedicated window after the NRL season. The Pacific tests were shifted to a Sunday afternoon slot, on the same day as game 2 of the State of Origin series.

The final test was played on 5 May 2017 at the Canberra Stadium with the Kangaroos winning 30–12 in front of 18,535 fans, the lowest attendance in Anzac Test history.

== Men's Test Match Results ==
Australia have won all but three Anzac Tests, while New Zealand have hosted only three tests.

Year	Winners	Score	Runner up	Venue	City/Town	Attendance
1997	Australia	34–22	New Zealand	Sydney Football Stadium	Sydney	23,829
1998	New Zealand	22–16	Australia	North Harbour Stadium	Auckland	25,000
1999	Australia	20–14	New Zealand	Stadium Australia	Sydney	30,245
2000	Australia	52–0	New Zealand	Stadium Australia	Sydney	26,023
2004	Australia	37–10	New Zealand	Newcastle Sports Centre	Newcastle	21,537
2005	Australia	32–16	New Zealand	Suncorp Stadium	Brisbane	40,317
2006	Australia	50–12	New Zealand	Suncorp Stadium	Brisbane	44,191
2007	Australia	30–6	New Zealand	Suncorp Stadium	Brisbane	35,241
2008	Australia	28–12	New Zealand	Sydney Cricket Ground	Sydney	34,571
2009	Australia	38–10	New Zealand	Suncorp Stadium	Brisbane	37,152
2010	Australia	12–8	New Zealand	AAMI Park	Melbourne	29,442
2011	Australia	20–10	New Zealand	Robina Stadium	Gold Coast	26,301
2012	Australia	20–12	New Zealand	Eden Park	Auckland	35,329
2013	Australia	32–12	New Zealand	Canberra Stadium	Canberra	25,628
2014	Australia	30–18	New Zealand	Sydney Football Stadium	Sydney	25,429
2015	New Zealand	26–12	Australia	Suncorp Stadium	Brisbane	32,681
2016	Australia	16–0	New Zealand	Newcastle Sports Centre	Newcastle	27,724
2017	Australia	30–12	New Zealand	Canberra Stadium	Canberra	18,535

=== Overall tally ===
Team	Wins
Australia^{1}	16
New Zealand	2

1. Includes the Australia (Super League) victory in 1997.

== Women's Test Match Results ==
The Women's Anzac Test Match is the Women's rugby league version of the game and was played between 2015 and 2017.

Year	Winners	Score	Runner up	Venue	City/Town
2015	Australia	22–14	New Zealand	Suncorp Stadium	Brisbane
2016	New Zealand	26–16	Australia	Newcastle Sports Centre	Newcastle
2017	Australia	16–4	New Zealand	Canberra Stadium	Canberra

=== Overall tally ===
Team	Wins
Australia	2
New Zealand	1

== See also ==
- List of results of the Australian national rugby league team
