= 2014 Anzac Test =

Rugby match

Australia	New Zealand
30	18
	1	2	Total
AUS	12	18	30
NZL	18	0	18
- Date: 2 May 2014
- Stadium: Allianz Stadium
- Location: Sydney, Australia
- Johnathan Thurston
- Referee: Shayne Hayne (Australia)
- Attendance: 25,429

Broadcast partners
- Broadcasters: Nine Network (AUS) Sky Sport (NZ)
- Commentators: Ray Warren; Phil Gould; Peter Sterling

The 2014 Anzac Test was a rugby league test match played between Australia and New Zealand at Allianz Stadium in Sydney on 2 May 2014. It was the 15th Anzac Test played between the two nations since the first was played under the Super League banner in 1997. It was also the first Test match played in Sydney since the 2010 Four Nations tournament. A Women's All Stars Match which is the Women's rugby league version of the game was played as the main curtain raiser for the Test, which was won 24–0 by the Women's All Stars.

== Pre-game ==
In the lead up to the test, Australia named an expected team, though Jarryd Hayne, a revelation in the unfamiliar position of centre during the 2013 World Cup, was unavailable through injury and was replaced by Canterbury's Josh Morris who was playing along his twin brother, St George Illawarra winger Brett. The twins were playing their fourth test alongside each other, and their first in Australia. Melbourne's incumbent Kangaroo halfback Cooper Cronk won a well publicised battle with Manly's Daly Cherry-Evans for the halfback role, though Cherry-Evans was chosen as a reserve being able to cover the halves, hooker or lock. Melbourne hooker Cameron Smith was playing in his 38th test for Australia and his 14th as captain. Coach Tim Sheens named experienced North Queensland Cowboys back Brent Tate as the squads 18th man. Brisbane Broncos utility player and fresh reserve Matt Gillett was the only player on debut for the Kangaroos, replacing injured Broncos teammate Sam Thaiday.

New Zealand however were in trouble with a number of players missing from the 2013 World Cup final loss to Australia in November. Not selected were the likes of Kevin Locke (languishing in the New Zealand Warriors NSW Cup side thanks to the presence of England fullback Sam Tomkins at the club), Manu Vatuvei, Kieran Foran, Jared Waerea-Hargreaves, Isaac Luke and Sonny Bill Williams. While Foran and Luke were injured and Williams had made himself unavailable, the biggest shock were the omissions of powerhouse winger Vatuvei and Sydney Roosters premiership winning front rower Waerea-Hargreaves. The Kiwis featured five players on debut as Kearney publicly stated they were looking to the future. Playing their first test match for the Kiwis were Manly's Peta Hiku (fullback), Warriors Ben Henry and Siliva Havili (hooker and reserve), West Tigers' Martin Taupau, and Penrith's Isaac John who was playing for the Panthers NSW Cup affiliate the Windsor Wolves when selected. Although it was his debut for NZ, John had previous international experience having represented the Cook Islands at the 2013 World Cup. Another debutante Kenny Bromwich was named as NZ's 18th man.

Due to the relative inexperience of the New Zealanders, and that the Kangaroos were aiming for their 16th straight test win to equal the record of the teams that won 16 straight from 1979 to 1983, the Australians were short priced odds to win their 14th Anzac Test since the first was held under the Super League banner in 1997 (though as a SL game, the Australian Rugby League (ARL) did not count it as an official Australian test). Many critics felt the game would be an easy win for Australia and the Kiwis were given little chance of pulling off what would have been an upset win.

=== National Anthems ===
- Geoff Sewell - New Zealand National Anthem
- Juila Messenger - Australia National Anthem

== Squads ==
Australia	Position	New Zealand
Billy Slater	Fullback	Peta Hiku
Darius Boyd	Wing	Roger Tuivasa-Sheck
Greg Inglis	Centre	Dean Whare
Josh Morris	Centre	Gerard Beale
Brett Morris	Wing	Jason Nightingale
Johnathan Thurston	Five-Eighth	Tohu Harris
Cooper Cronk	Halfback	Shaun Johnson
Matt Scott	Prop	Jesse Bromwich
Cameron Smith (c)	Hooker	Ben Henry
Nate Myles	Prop	Sam Moa
Greg Bird	2nd Row	Simon Mannering (c)
Boyd Cordner	2nd Row	Kevin Proctor
Paul Gallen	Lock	Adam Blair
Daly Cherry-Evans	Interchange	Siliva Havili
Matt Gillett*	Interchange	Martin Taupau
James Tamou	Interchange	Greg Eastwood
Corey Parker	Interchange	Isaac John
Tim Sheens	Coach	Stephen Kearney
Brent Tate	18th Man	Kenneath Bromwich

^{1} Replaced originally selected Sam Thaiday who withdrew due to injury.

== Match Summary ==
2 May 2014
8:05pm (AEST)

Australia	30 – 18	New Zealand
Tries; Brett Morris (18', 52') 2 Greg Bird (12') 1 Greg Inglis (61') 1 Cooper Cronk (73') 1 Goals; Johnathan Thurston 5/5 (13', 20', 54', 62', 75')		Tries; Jesse Bromwich (6') 1 Tohu Harris (22') 1 Sam Moa (26') 1 Goals; Shaun Johnson 3/3 (7', 23', 29')

Allianz Stadium, Sydney
Attendance: 25,429
Referee: Shayne Hayne (Australia)
Player of the Match: Johnathan Thurston
