= Adam Blair =

New Zealand rugby league footballer and coach

Adam Blair MNZM
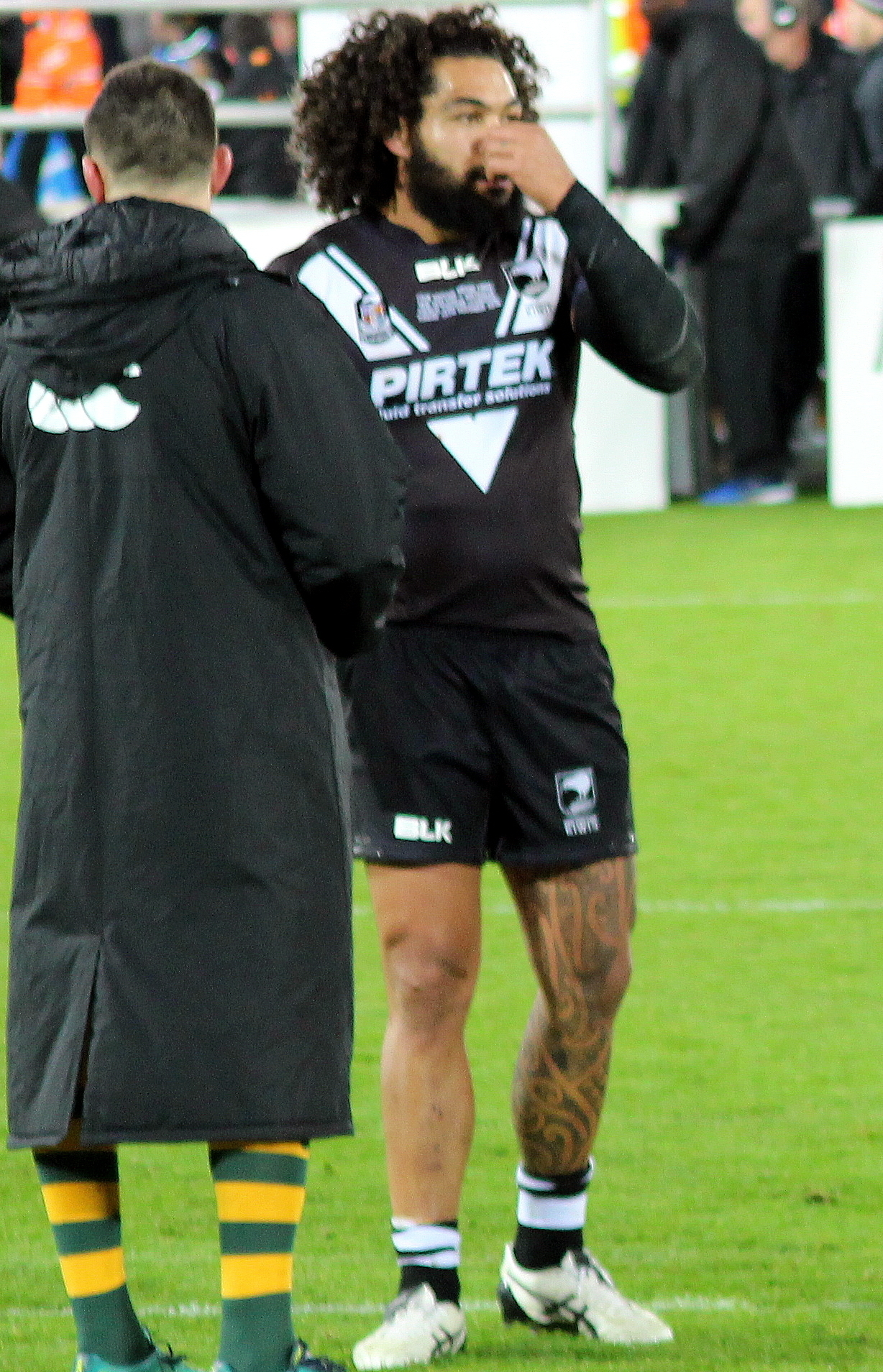
- Born: Adam Ngawati Blair; 20 March 1986 (age 40); Whangārei, New Zealand
- Rugby league career

Playing information
- Height: 188 cm (6 ft 2 in)
- Weight: 109 kg (17 st 2 lb)
- Position: Prop, Second-row, Lock
Club
Years	Team	Pld	T	G	FG	P
2006–11	Melbourne Storm	121	5	0	0	20
2012–14	Wests Tigers	71	4	0	0	16
2015–17	Brisbane Broncos	74	2	0	0	8
2018–20	New Zealand Warriors	65	3	0	0	12
	Total	331	14	0	0	56
Representative
Years	Team	Pld	T	G	FG	P
2006–19	New Zealand	51	2	0	0	8
2010	NRL All Stars	1	0	0	0	0
2019–20	New Zealand Māori	2	0	1	0	2

Coaching information
Representative
Years	Team	Gms	W	D	L	W%
2024–26	Māori All Stars	3	1	1	1	33

Adam Ngawati Blair MNZM (born 20 March 1986) is a New Zealand rugby league coach and former professional rugby league footballer who played as a prop, second-row forward and lock in the National Rugby League (NRL), and the New Zealand and the New Zealand Māori international teams.

Blair previously played for the Melbourne Storm between 2006 and 2011, where he won the 2009 NRL Grand Final, which was later stripped due to salary cap breaches, the Wests Tigers between 2012 and 2014, the Brisbane Broncos between 2015 and 2017, and finally the New Zealand Warriors between 2018 and his final season in 2020. He was a member of the New Zealand side that won the 2008 World Cup, and has captained the team and played for the NRL All Stars.

Blair has also been employed by Sky Sport (New Zealand) as a presenter during rugby league shows.

== Early years ==
Blair was born in Whangarei, New Zealand, and is of Māori descent.

Blair played his junior football for the Northland Carvers and attended Whangarei Boys' High School before recruited by the Melbourne Storm as a 16-year-old where he moved to Brisbane, Queensland, and played for their feeder club the Norths Devils with Greg Inglis while attending Wavell State High School. Blair was a Junior Kiwi in 2002 and 2003.

== Playing career ==
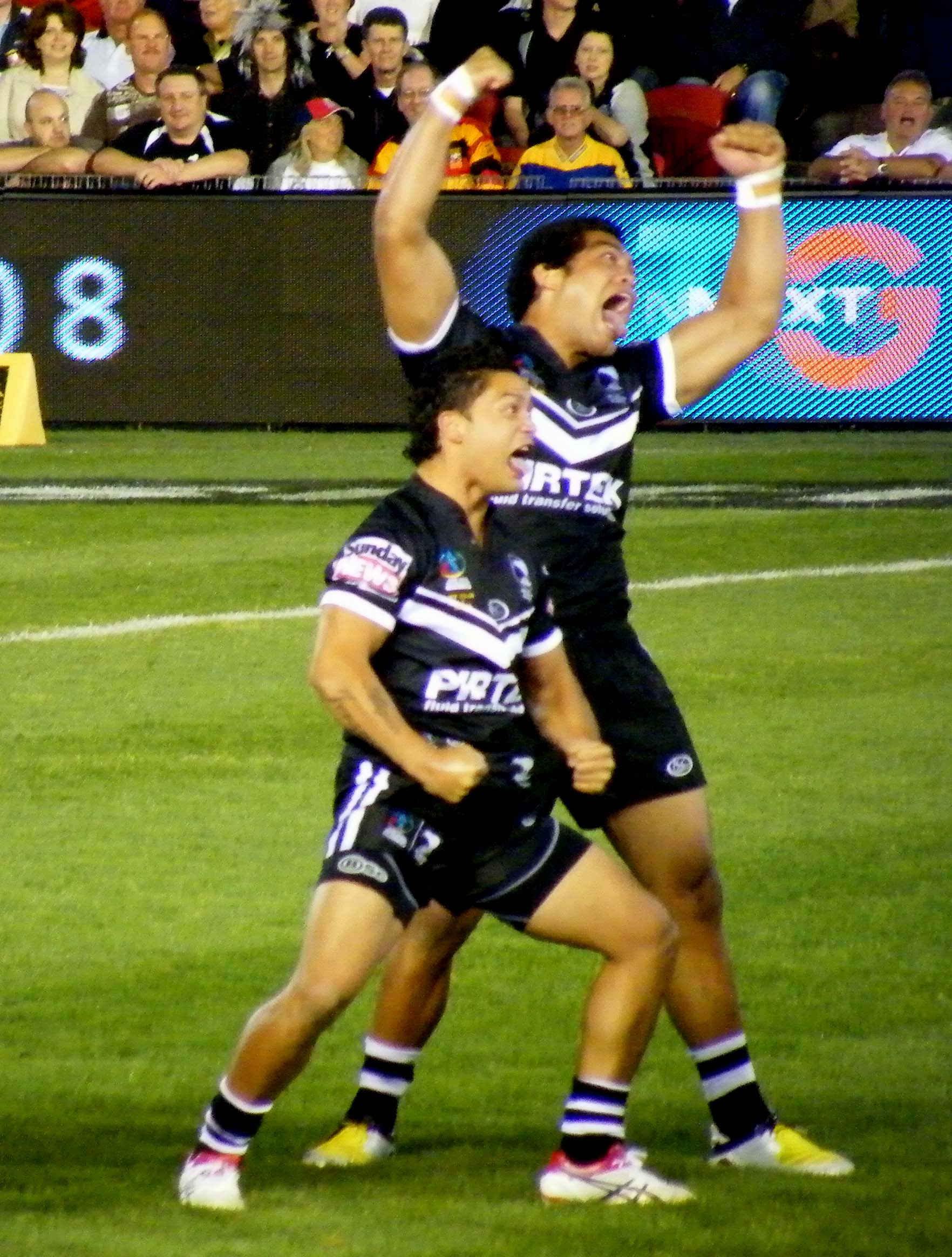
Blair and Issac Luke performing the Haka

=== 2006 ===
In Round 4, Blair made his NRL debut for the Melbourne Storm against the Wests Tigers where he played off the interchange bench in the Storms' 30–28 loss at Leichhardt Oval. He played off the bench in the Storm's 15–8 grand final loss to the Brisbane Broncos. Blair was awarded the Rookie of the Year for the club, playing in 16 matches during the season. Awarded with selection in the New Zealand national rugby league team 2006 Tri-Nations series squad, Blair made his international debut against Australia, playing off the interchange bench in the 30–18 loss at Mt Smart Stadium on 14 October. Blair played in all 4 matches of the tournament including the Kiwis 16–12 Tri-Nations Final loss against Australia.

=== 2007 ===
Blair missed most of the 2007 NRL season due to a foot injury which he suffered in the last year's Tri-Nations Final, playing in only 8 matches for the Storm.

=== 2008 ===
On 9 May, Blair played for New Zealand in the historical Centenary Test against Australia in a 28–12 loss. In the Storm's preliminary finals match against the Cronulla-Sutherland Sharks, Blair scored his first NRL career try in the 28–0 win at Sydney Football Stadium. On 5 October, Blair played off the bench in the Storm's 40–0 Grand Final loss to the Manly-Warringah Sea Eagles. He finished the 2008 NRL season with him playing in 27 matches and scoring 1 try.

After the Grand Final, Blair was named in the final 24-man New Zealand squad for the World Cup. In the match against Papua New Guinea, Blair scored his first international try and was named as the Man-of-the-Match in the 48–6 win at Cbus Super Stadium. On 23 November, he started at prop and scored a try as New Zealand defeated Australia 34–20 in the Final at Suncorp Stadium. Blair played in all 6 matches for the Kiwis in the tournament.

=== 2009 ===
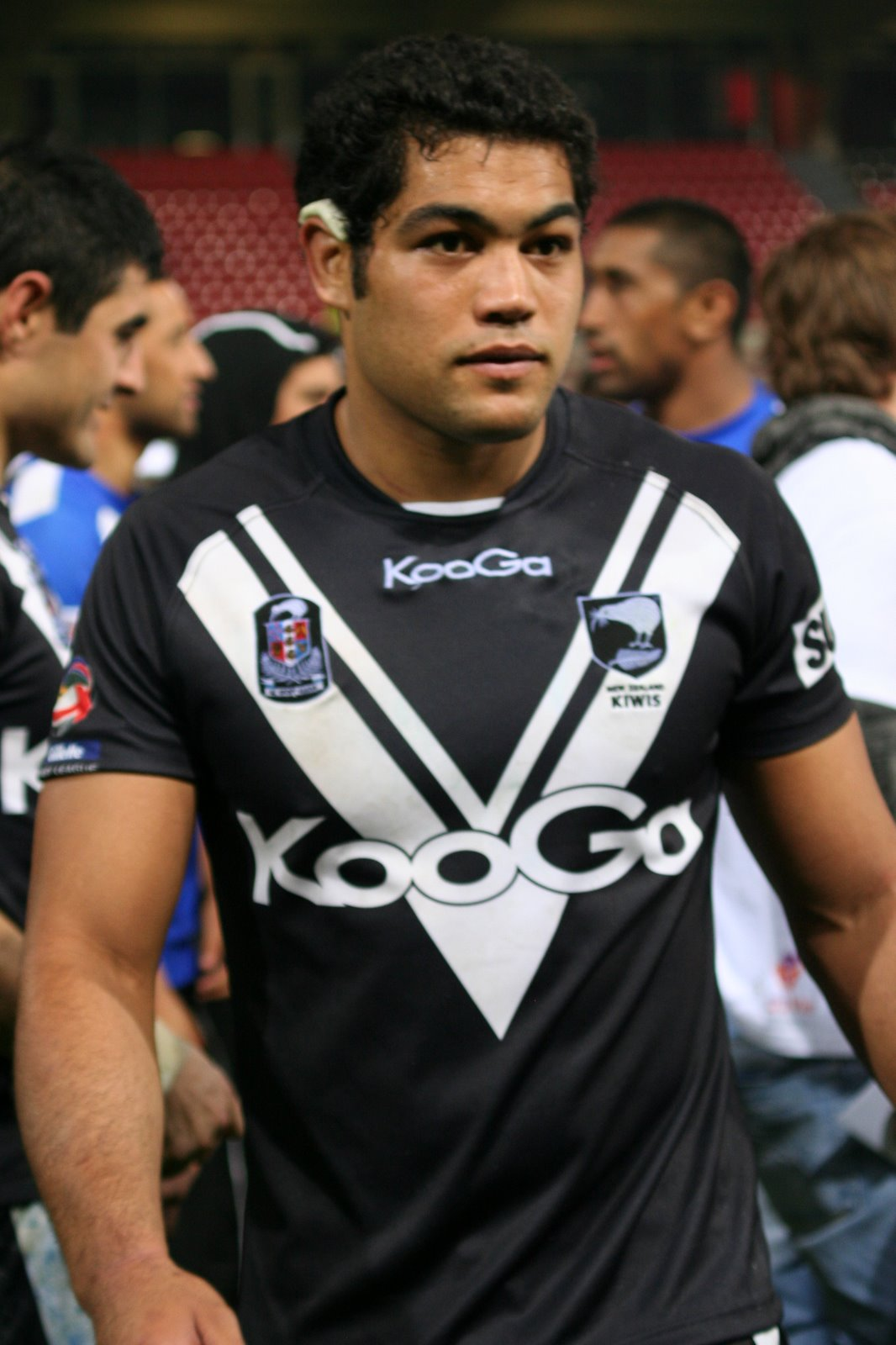
Blair at the 2009 Four Nations

On 8 May, Blair played for New Zealand in the 2009 ANZAC Test, where he started at prop in the 38–10 loss. On 4 October, Blair played in the Storm's 2009 NRL Grand Final against the Parramatta Eels, where he started at second-row and scored the second try of the match and set up Billy Slater's try to lead the team to the 23–16 victory. He scored 2 tries in 29 matches in 2009. Blair was also named vice-captain of the Kiwis for the Four Nations and played in all 3 of their matches.

=== 2010 ===
As vice-captain for the Kiwis, Blair was an automatic selection for the NRL All Stars team against the Indigenous All Stars where he started at prop in the 16–12 loss. On 7 May, he played lock for New Zealand in the 2010 ANZAC Test. Blair finished the Storm's drama-filled 2010 NRL season with 1 try from 22 matches. He was chosen in the 23-man New Zealand Four Nations squad. On 13 November, in New Zealand's Four Nations Final match against Australia, Blair started at prop as the Kiwis won 16–12 after a try to Nathan Fien with 2 minutes to fulltime. Blair played in 4 matches in the tournament.

=== 2011 ===
In Round 2 against the Gold Coast Titans, Blair played his 100th NRL career match in the Storm's 40–12 win at AAMI Park. On 6 May, he played for New Zealand in the 2011 ANZAC Test. On 13 July, it was confirmed that Blair signed a 4-year-deal with the Wests Tigers starting from 2012 worth around $500,000 a season. In Round 25 against Manly in the match dubbed as the "Battle of Brookvale" after Blair's involvement in a fight with Manly forward Glenn Stewart made headlines around the world. The incident started with a fight between Manly's Darcy Lussick and Melbourne's Ryan Hinchcliffe, after Hinchcliffe elbowed Lussick as he tackled him. Other players, including, notably, Stewart and Blair, joined in the melee. But while the drama should have ended with Stewart and Blair being sin-binned, instead it escalated. Stewart, sin-binned first, walked off. Blair, sin-binned second, jogged off. Blair caught up with Stewart and the pair exchanged words—the speculation is Blair suggested the pair to "get it on" and the fists started flying. Then, four other Manly players—including Stewart's brother, Brett—ran in from a distance to get involved. That was the signal for a melee that drew players from everywhere, including the Melbourne bench. Blair and Stewart were later obviously sent off for the rest of the match. The match turned out to be Blair's last match for the Storm after he was suspended for 5 matches, which made him miss the final series. Blair finished his last year with the Storm with 23 matches and 1 try. Blair was selected in the Kiwis 23-man squad in the 2011 Four Nations series. He played in 2 matches.

=== 2012 ===
In Round 1 of the 2012 NRL season, Blair made his club debut for the Wests Tigers against the Cronulla-Sutherland Sharks, where he started at second-row in the 17–16 win at Leichhardt Oval. In the next match in Round 2 against the Manly, Blair scored his first try for the Tigers in the 22–18 loss at Central Coast Stadium. On 20 April, Blair played for New Zealand in the 2012 ANZAC Test where he started at second-row in the 20–12 loss. He finished his first year with the Wests Tigers with 23 matches. However, with an average of 3 missed tackles a game and low yardage achieved with the ball, Blair was described as one of, "the biggest flops of 2012." Despite the criticism, coach Mick Potter praised his communication and leadership skills during the off-season.

=== 2013 ===
In Round 6 against the St George Illawarra Dragons, Blair played his 150th NRL career match. Blair's form in the early rounds of the season was a shadow of his former self that he showed at Storm, with the Daily Telegraph writing an article asking, "Is Blair the worst NRL signing ever?" From Round 11 onwards, Blair was moved into the front row, where he stayed for the rest of the season. Blair said, "Everyone knows what I can bring and how I can play. I'm just not doing that enough for the team at the moment and for the people that want to see me do better for the team. Blair finished the year with 24 matches and 1 try.

=== 2014 ===
A "strong start" to 2014 saw Blair selected for New Zealand in the 2014 Anzac Test where he started at lock in the 30–18 loss against Australia at Sydney Football Stadium. Blair was the Wests Tigers' second best performer for hit-ups and tackles made for the season, and played in all of the Tigers 24 matches. He was selected in the Kiwis final 24-man squad for the 2014 Four Nations series. He played in all 4 matches in the tournament. On 15 November, Blair played at prop in the Kiwis 22–18 Four Nations final win over Australia. On 17 November, Blair was granted a release from his contract from the Wests Tigers and on the next day on 18 November it was announced that he had signed with the Brisbane Broncos on a three-year deal, starting in 2015. Blair later said of Wests Tigers period, "[I'd] be lying if I said I was 100 per cent happy."

=== 2015 ===
In Round 1, Blair made his debut for the Brisbane Broncos against the South Sydney Rabbitohs, starting at prop in the 36–6 loss at Suncorp Stadium. In Round 10 against the North Queensland Cowboys, he played his 200th NRL match in the Broncos 31–20 loss at 1300SMILES Stadium. In Round 18 against the Canterbury-Bankstown Bulldogs, Blair scored his club try for the Broncos in the 16–8 win at ANZ Stadium. On 4 October, in the Broncos Queensland derby 2015 NRL Grand Final against the North Queensland Cowboys, Blair started at prop in the historic golden point 17–16 loss. Blair played in 23 matches and scored 1 try in his first year with the Brisbane Broncos. He was selected in the 23-man New Zealand squad to tour England, where he was one of four members of Brisbane's grand final team to be included in coach Stephen Kearney's squad. He co-captained the Kiwis in all 3 matches against England, starting at lock in the Kiwis' 2–1 Baskerville Shield series loss.

=== 2016 ===
Blair was named in the Broncos pre-season Nines squad. On 6 May, Blair played for New Zealand in the 2016 ANZAC Test, starting at prop in the 16–0 loss. After he performed a chicken wing tackle on Broncos teammate Sam Thaiday, he was given a 1 match suspension. Blair was subjected to criticism by former Broncos player Gorden Tallis saying that he was "one of the dirtiest players on the field and he means to do it. I don't know why Wayne Bennett keeps letting it go. I am disappointed he wears the Broncos jersey." Blair later responded saying "I'm man enough to cop what he (Tallis) says and, to be honest, I couldn't care less. What has hurt me out of all this is the impact it has on my family and my friends. I have a five-year-old son and it's not a good look when my boy has to go to school and he hears stuff from other kids and parents." Blair finished off the 2016 NRL season with 24 matches. Blair was selected in the New Zealand Four Nations 24-man squad. and played in all 5 matches including starting at prop in the 34–8 Final loss against Australia.

=== 2017 ===
On 5 May, Blair played for New Zealand in the 2017 ANZAC Test off the interchange bench in the 30–12 loss at Canberra Stadium. Blair was named captain of New Zealand for the World Cup due to Jesse Bromwich being stripped of the captaincy after he and Kevin Proctor were caught in possession of cocaine after the test. In Round 11 against one of his former clubs the Wests Tigers, Blair played his 250th NRL match in the 36–0 win at Suncorp Stadium. Playing as starting prop in every game of the Broncos season, Blair scored one try from his 27 matches. His final game for the club was in the preliminary final against Melbourne Storm, where he was again criticised for dirty play. After a late hit on Cooper Cronk, commentator Andrew Johns said, "It's a coward (act). It's absolutely dirty play. It's not needed. He sees the ball go and he's giving away 30 kg to a smaller man and he hits him in the back." On 3 October 2017, it was announced that Blair signed 3-year deal worth about $2.4 million with the New Zealand Warriors starting in 2018.

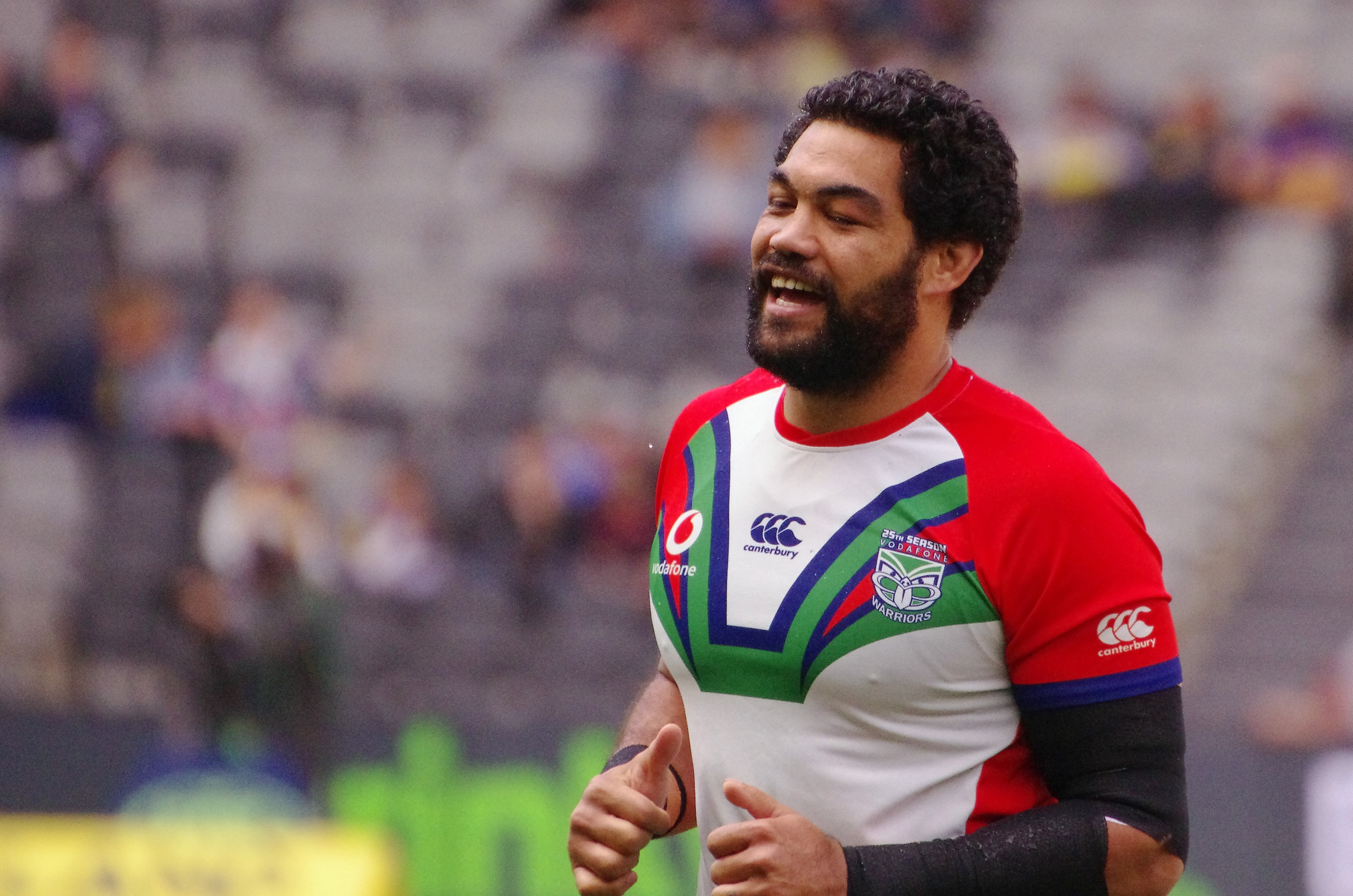
Blair warming up for the Warriors in 2019

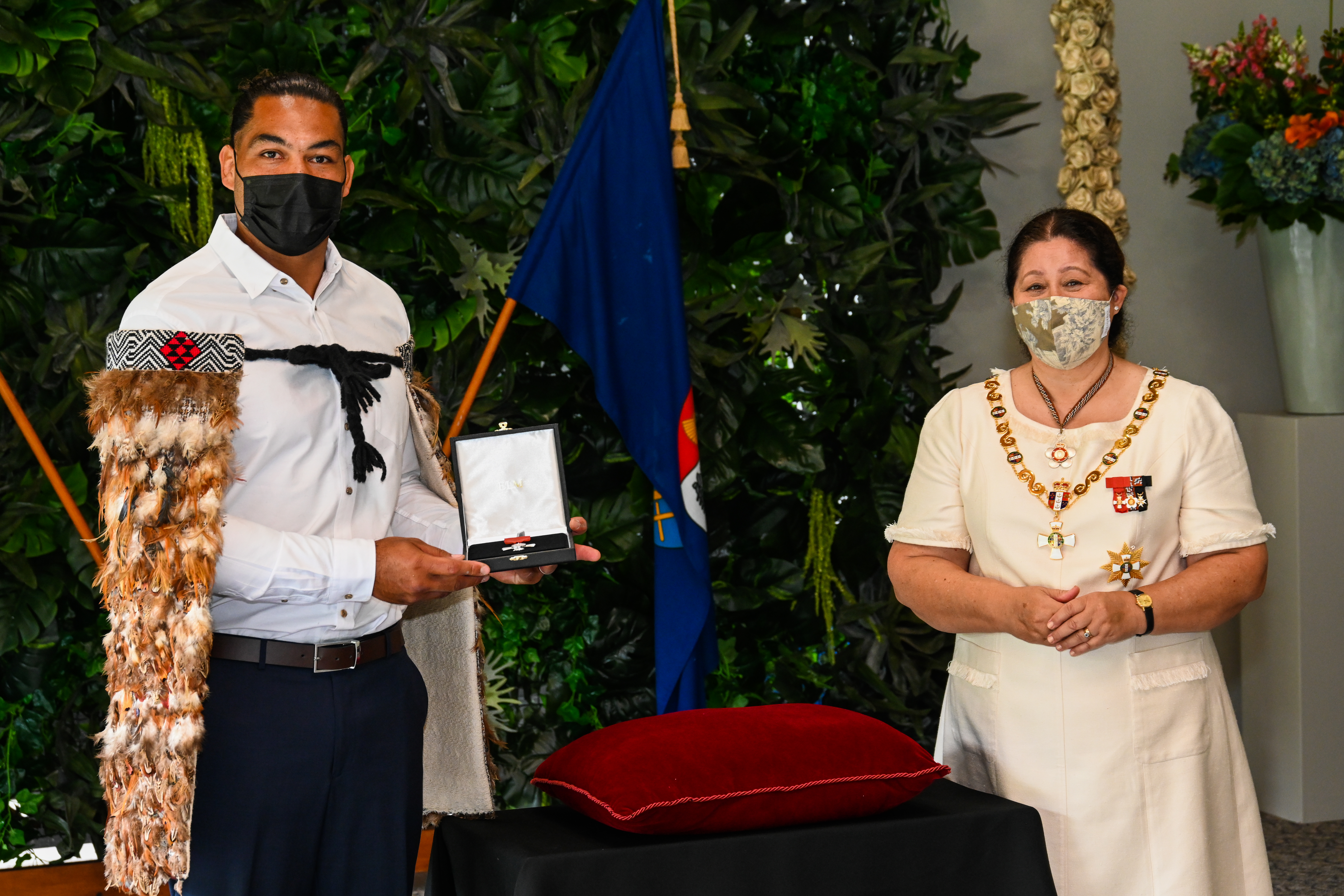
Blair (left), after his investiture as a Member of the New Zealand Order of Merit by the governor-general, Dame Cindy Kiro, at Government House, Auckland, on 17 February 2022

Blair was named as captain of the New Zealand Kiwis squad for the World Cup. Two days later, Blair openly criticised Jason Taumalolo's shock defection to play for Tonga, Blair commenting that Taumalolo is not "man enough" and that he betrayed the "black jersey". Blair played in all of the 4 matches at lock in the Kiwis disappointing campaign after losses to second-tier teams Tonga and Fiji. After the Kiwis 4–2 loss to Fiji at Westpac Stadium in Wellington, Blair was heavily criticised after a post-match interview, with him chewing gum and describing the loss as a "great game to watch" and "not a negative".

=== 2018 ===
In Round 1 of the 2018 NRL season, Blair made his club debut for the New Zealand Warriors against the South Sydney Rabbitohs, starting at prop in their 32–20 win at Perth Stadium.

=== 2019 ===
During the 2019 fall internationals, Blair became the second New Zealander to earn 50 international caps.

=== 2020 ===
In the last week of 2020 National Rugby League Season Blair would announce his retirement from playing career. The New Zealand Warriors would go on to win their final match of the season 40–28 over the Manly-Warringah Sea Eagles.

At the time of Blair's retirement, he had the most NRL appearances by a New Zealander at 331, though this would eventually be over taken by former team-mate Benji Marshall.

== Coaching career ==
In August 2022, Blair was announced to be an assistant coach with the NZ Māori All-Star team.

After one season coaching with the New Zealand Warriors Youth Academy, and just one week removed from his appointment on the NZ Māori Team, Blair would be announced as the clubs S.G Ball (Under 16) head coach.

== Honours ==
In the 2021 Queen's Birthday Honours, Blair was appointed a Member of the New Zealand Order of Merit, for services to rugby league.

== Statistics ==
Year	Team	Games	Tries	Pts
2006	Melbourne Storm	16		
2007	Melbourne Storm	8		
2008	Melbourne Storm	27	1	4
2009	Melbourne Storm	25	2	8
2010	Melbourne Storm	22		
2011	Melbourne Storm	23	1	4
2012	Wests Tigers	23	3	12
2013	Wests Tigers	24	1	4
2014	Wests Tigers	24		
2015	Brisbane Broncos	23	1	4
2016	Brisbane Broncos	24		
2017	Brisbane Broncos	27	1	4
2018	Warriors	23	1	4
2019	Warriors	22	2	8
2020	Warriors	20		
	Totals	331	14	56
