= 2004 Anzac Test =

Australia	New Zealand
37	10
	1	2	Total
AUS	12	25	37
NZL	10	0	10
- Date: 23 April 2004
- Stadium: EnergyAustralia Stadium
- Location: Newcastle, Australia
- Darren Lockyer
- Referee: Sean Hampstead (Australia)
- Attendance: 21,537

Broadcast partners
- Broadcasters: Nine Network (AUS) Sky Sport (NZ)
- Commentators: Ray Warren; Phil Gould; Peter Sterling

The 2004 ANZAC test was a rugby league test match played between Australia and New Zealand at the EnergyAustralia Stadium in Newcastle on 23 April 2004. It was the 5th Anzac test played between the two nations since the first was played under the Super League banner in 1997 and the first to be played in Newcastle.

== Squads ==
Australia	Position	New Zealand
Anthony Minichiello	Fullback	Nigel Vagana
Timana Tahu	Wing	Lesley Vainikolo
Matthew Gidley	Centre	Paul Whatuira
Brent Tate	Centre	Clinton Toopi
Michael De Vere	Wing	Francis Meli
Darren Lockyer (c)	Five-Eighth	Sione Faumuina
Craig Gower	Halfback	Thomas Leuluai
Shane Webcke	Prop	Jason Cayless
Danny Buderus	Hooker	Robbie Paul
Joel Clinton	Prop	Nathan Cayless (c)
Nathan Hindmarsh	2nd Row	Tony Puletua
Steve Price	2nd Row	Joe Galuvao
Shaun Timmins	Lock	David Kidwell
Shaun Berrigan	Interchange	Jerry Seuseu
Trent Waterhouse	Interchange	Sonny Bill Williams
Michael Crocker	Interchange	Tevita Leo-Latu
Luke Bailey	Interchange	Stephen Kearney
Wayne Bennett	Coach	Daniel Anderson

== Match Summary ==
23 April 2004
7:30pm (AEST)

Australia	37 – 10	New Zealand
Tries; Michael Crocker; Michael De Vere; Craig Gower; Darren Lockyer; Anthony Minichiello; Timana Tahu; Brent Tate; Goals; Michael de Vere (4/7); Field Goals; Darren Lockyer		Tries; David Kidwell; Lesley Vainikolo Goals; Sione Faumuina (1/2)

EnergyAustralia Stadium, Newcastle
Attendance: 21,537
Referee: Sean Hampstead
Player of the Match: Darren Lockyer
