= 2005 Anzac Test =

Australia	New Zealand
32	16
	1	2	Total
AUS	22	10	32
NZL	10	6	16
- Date: 22 April 2005
- Stadium: Suncorp Stadium
- Location: Brisbane, Australia
- Referee: Russell Smith (England)
- Attendance: 40,317

Broadcast partners
- Broadcasters: Nine Network (AUS) Sky Sport (NZ)
- Commentators: Ray Warren; Phil Gould; Peter Sterling

The 2005 Anzac Test was a rugby league test match played between Australia and New Zealand at the Suncorp Stadium in Brisbane on 22 April 2005. It was the 6th Anzac test played between the two nations since the first was played under the Super League banner in 1997 and the first to be played in Brisbane.

== Squads ==
Australia	Position	New Zealand
Anthony Minichiello	Fullback	Jerome Ropati
Luke Rooney	Wing	Jamahl Lolesi
Shaun Berrigan	Centre	Nigel Vagana
Willie Tonga	Centre	Paul Whatuira
Matt Sing	Wing	Matt Utai
Darren Lockyer (c)	Five-Eighth	Benji Marshall
Brett Kimmorley	Halfback	Thomas Leuluai
Steve Price	Prop	Paul Rauhihi
Luke Priddis	Hooker	Louis Anderson
Petero Civoniceva	Prop	Ruben Wiki (c)
Nathan Hindmarsh	2nd Row	Frank Pritchard
Craig Fitzgibbon	2nd Row	Wairangi Koopu
Tonie Carroll	Lock	David Kidwell
Craig Wing	Interchange	Dene Halatau
Ben Kennedy	Interchange	Nathan Cayless
Mark O'Meley	Interchange	Roy Asotasi
Trent Waterhouse	Interchange	Clinton Toopi
Wayne Bennett	Coach	Daniel Anderson

== Match Summary ==
22 April 2005
7:30pm (AEST)

Australia	32 – 16	New Zealand
Tries; Shaun Berrigan; Tonie Carroll; Darren Lockyer; Anthony Minichiello; Matt Sing; Willie Tonga; Goals; Craig Fitzgibbon (4/6)		Tries; Jerome Ropati (2); Matt Utai Goals; Jamahl Lolesi (2/3)

Suncorp Stadium, Brisbane
Attendance: 40,317
Referee: Russell Smith (England)
