= 1998 Anzac Test =

New Zealand	Australia
22	16
	1	2	Total
NZL	6	16	22
AUS	12	4	16
- Date: 24 April 1998
- Stadium: North Harbour Stadium
- Location: Auckland, New Zealand
- Robbie Paul
- Referee: Russell Smith (England)
- Attendance: 24,620

Broadcast partners
- Broadcasters: Nine Network (AUS) Sky Sport (NZ)
- Commentators: Ray Warren; Peter Sterling; Paul Vautin; Gary Freeman

The 1998 Anzac test was a rugby league test match played between Australia and New Zealand at the North Harbour Stadium 24 April 1998. It was the 2nd Anzac test played between the two nations since the first was played under the Super League banner in 1997 and the first to be played in New Zealand.

Australia led 12-6 at half time after two tries to Terry Hill while Kevin Iro crossed for the home side, but the Kiwis came back thanks to two tries after half time by Sean Hoppe and Terry Hermansson which saw NZ lead 18-12. After Steve Renouf scored with only his 3rd touch of the game midway through the second half, the game was in the balance with the score at 18-16. Kevin Iro then put the result beyond doubt with his second try with 2 minutes remaining to give the home side a 22-16 win in front of an almost full house of 24,620 fans. This was New Zealand's first win over Australia since the first test of the 1991 Trans-Tasman Test series at the Olympic Park Stadium in Melbourne.

== Squads ==
Although Rodney Howe, Brad Thorn and Darren Lockyer had played Super League Tests for Australia in 1997, according to official Australian Rugby League records (but not International Rugby League records) which do not recognise any test match played under the Super League banner, they along with Mat Rogers made their test debuts for Australia in this game.

New Zealand	Position	Australia
Matthew Ridge (c)	Fullback	Robbie O'Davis
Sean Hoppe	Wing	Wendell Sailor
Richie Blackmore	Centre	Terry Hill
Ruben Wiki	Centre	Steve Renouf
Richie Barnett	Wing	Mat Rogers
Robbie Paul	Five-eighth	Laurie Daley (c)
Stacey Jones	Halfback	Andrew Johns
John Lomax	Prop	Rodney Howe
Henry Paul	Hooker	Geoff Toovey
Quentin Pongia	Prop	Paul Harragon
Jarrod McCracken	Second-row	Steve Menzies
Tony Iro	Second-row	Brad Thorn
Logan Swann	Lock	Brad Fittler
Nigel Vagana	Interchange	Darren Lockyer
Terry Hermansson	Interchange	Nik Kosef
Kevin Iro	Interchange	Glenn Lazarus
Joe Vagana	Interchange	Dean Pay
Frank Endacott	Coach	Bob Fulton

== Match summary ==
24 April 1998
7:30pm (AEST)

New Zealand	22 – 16	Australia
Tries; Kevin Iro (2); Sean Hoppe; Terry Hermansson; Goals; Matthew Ridge (3/5)		Tries; Terry Hill (2); Steve Renouf Goals; Mat Rogers (2/4)

North Harbour Stadium, Auckland
Attendance: 24,620
Referee: Russell Smith (England)
Player of the Match: Robbie Paul
