= 1999 Anzac Test =

Australia	New Zealand
20	14
	1	2	Total
AUS	6	14	20
NZL	6	8	14
- Date: 23 April 1999
- Stadium: Stadium Australia
- Location: Sydney, New South Wales, Australia
- Referee: Stuart Cummings (England)
- Attendance: 30,245

Broadcast partners
- Broadcasters: Nine Network (AUS) Sky Sport (NZ)
- Commentators: Ray Warren; Andrew Voss; Peter Sterling

The 1999 Anzac test was a rugby league test match played between Australia and New Zealand at the Sydney Olympic Stadium 23 April 1999. It was the 3rd Anzac test played between the two nations since the first was played under the Super League banner in 1997 and the second to be played in Sydney.

== Teams ==
Australia	Position	New Zealand
Darren Lockyer	Fullback	Richie Barnett
Wendell Sailor	Wing	Sean Hoppe
Laurie Daley	Centre	Willie Talau
Darren Smith	Centre	Ruben Wiki
Mat Rogers	Wing	Lesley Vainikolo
Brad Fittler (c)	Five-eighth	Robbie Paul
Allan Langer	Halfback	Stacey Jones
Shane Webcke	Prop	Joe Vagana
Andrew Johns	Hooker	Henry Paul
Glenn Lazarus	Prop	Jason Lowrie
Robbie Kearns	2nd Row	Jarrod McCracken (c)
Gorden Tallis	2nd Row	Nathan Cayless
Jason Smith	Lock	Logan Swann
Matt Sing	Interchange	David Kidwell
Steve Price	Interchange	Matt Rua
Nik Kosef	Interchange	Terry Hermansson
Bryan Fletcher	Interchange	Richard Swain
Chris Anderson	Coach	Frank Endacott

== Match summary ==
23 April 1999
7:30pm (AEST)

Australia	20 – 14	New Zealand
Tries: Wendell Sailor (28') 1 Darren Smith (43') 1 Brad Fittler (58') 1 Goals: Mat Rogers 4/4 (30', 44', 60', 76' pen)	1st: 6 - 6; 2nd: 14 - 8 Report	Tries: Robbie Paul (3') 1 Logan Swann (49') 1 Lesley Vainikolo (64') 1 Goals: Henry Paul 1/3 (4'); Field Goals: Henry Paul 0/1

Stadium Australia
Attendance: 30,245
Referee: Stuart Cummings (England)
