= Jason Nightingale =

NZ international rugby league footballer

Jason 'The Gypsy' Nightingale
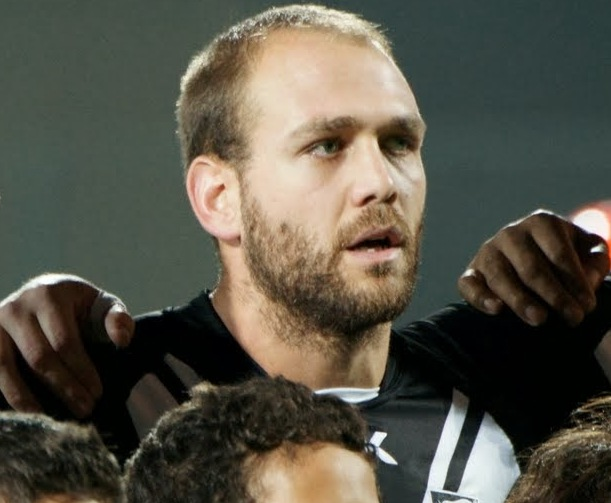

Personal information
- Full name: Jason Nightingale
- Born: 20 September 1986 (age 40) Paddington, New South Wales, Australia

Playing information
- Height: 183 cm (6 ft 0 in)
- Weight: 91 kg (14 st 5 lb)
- Position: Wing, Fullback
Club
Years	Team	Pld	T	G	FG	P
2007–18	St George Illawarra	268	110	0	0	440
Representative
Years	Team	Pld	T	G	FG	P
2008–17	New Zealand	33	19	0	0	76
2012	NRL All Stars	1	0	0	0	0

Jason Nightingale (born 20 September 1986) is a former New Zealand international rugby league footballer who played as a winger and fullback for the St. George Illawarra Dragons in the NRL.

He primarily played on the wing and as a fullback, but off the bench he's played as a centre, lock, second row and even prop. Nightingale spent his entire career with the Dragons, with whom he won the 2010 NRL Premiership. Nightingale was also a member of the New Zealand national rugby league team that beat Australia in the 2008 Rugby League World Cup Final.

== Background ==
Born in the Sydney suburb of Paddington, New South Wales, Australia to New Zealand parents, Nightingale is of Māori descent (specifically the Waikato Tainui Iwi). He moved to Mount Maunganui in New Zealand at the age of six months, returned to Australia, then moved back to New Zealand to Morrinsville for two years, before settling in Australia at age 13. In Sydney, he played his junior rugby league for Renown United. Nightingale played for the St George Illawarra Dragons Jersey Flegg Cup team.

== Playing career ==
=== 2007 ===
In round 8, Nightingale made his NRL debut for St. George Illawarra against the Penrith Panthers, playing on the wing and scoring a try on debut in the 28–16 win at Jubilee Oval. He finished his debut season with 7 tries from 16 matches.

=== 2008 ===
Nightingale was selected for New Zealand for the 2008 Centenary Test against Australia, making his international debut for New Zealand on the wing in the Kiwis 28–12 loss at the SCG. Nightingale finished the 2008 NRL season playing in 24 matches and scoring 13 tries for St. George Illawarra. In August 2008, Nightingale was chosen for the New Zealand training squad for the 2008 Rugby League World Cup. Nightingale originally missed out of the final 24-man Kiwis squad for the World Cup, but was chosen as a replacement for the injured Brent Webb. Nightingale only played in one match in the World Cup, playing against England and scored a try in the Kiwis 36–24 win at Hunter Stadium.

=== 2009 ===
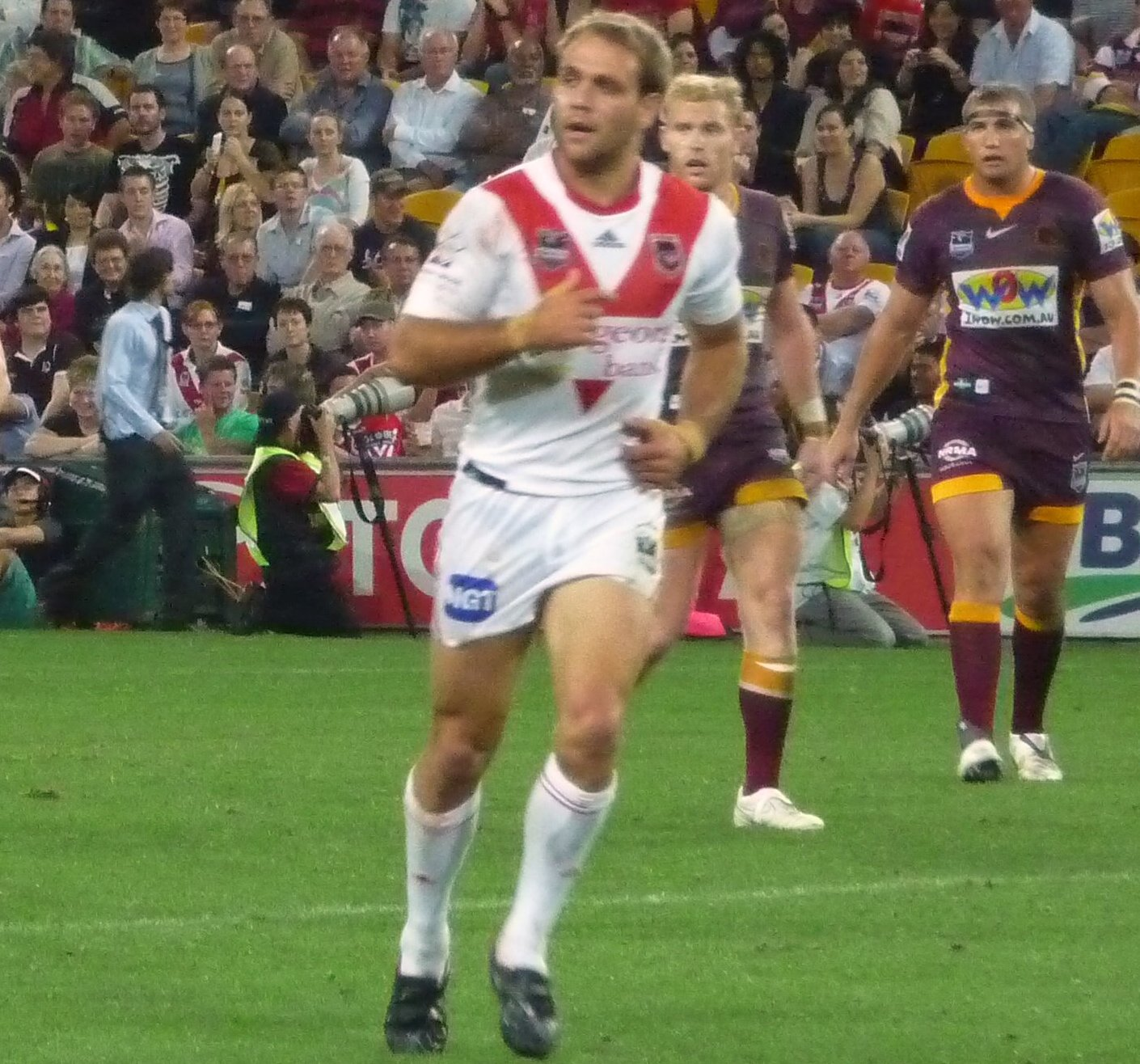
Nightingale playing for the St George Illawarra Dragons against the Brisbane Broncos in 2009

In 2009, Nightingale was selected for St. George Illawarra's feeder side Shellharbour Dragons for some matches during the season after being stuck behind Brett Morris and Wendell Sailor on the wing. Nightingale was selected on the interchange bench for the Kiwis 2008 Anzac Test in the 38–10 loss against Australia at Suncorp Stadium. Nightingale played in 18 matches and scored three tries for St. George Illawarra in the 2009 NRL season.

=== 2010 ===
In 2010, after the retirement of Wendell Sailor, Nightingale returned to the starting lineup on the wing. For the 2010 Anzac Test, Nightingale was selected to play for New Zealand on the wing, scoring a try in their 12–8 loss against Australia at AAMI Park. On 3 October 2010, in St. George Illawarra's 2010 NRL Grand Final against the Sydney Roosters, Nightingale played on the wing and scored two second-half tries to help the club to achieve the 32–8 victory. Nightingale played in 26 matches and scored 16 tries in St. George Illawarra's successful 2010 NRL season.

Nightingale was chosen in the New Zealand Kiwis 2010 Rugby League Four Nations squad, scoring three tries in four games, including a 71st minute try in the final at Suncorp Stadium. Nightingale's fine late season form saw him earning a place in Rugby League World's team of the year on the wing.

=== 2011 ===
On 9 March 2011, Nightingale extended his contract with St. George Illawarra for a further four years until the end of the 2015 season. Nightingale was selected for the Kiwis for the 2011 Anzac Test against Australia on the wing in the Kiwis 20–10 loss at Cbus Super Stadium. In round 19, against the Cronulla-Sutherland Sharks, Nightingale played his 100th National Rugby League career match in St. George Illawarra's 38–8 win at Jubilee Oval. Nightingale was named the Dragons 'Player of the Year' for the 2011 NRL season, playing in 25 matches and scoring 10 tries for the Dragons. Nightingale was selected for the New Zealand national rugby league team 2011 Rugby League Four Nations squad, playing in 4 matches and scoring three tries.

=== 2012 ===
On 4 February 2012, Nightingale was selected for the NRL All Stars team against the Indigenous All Stars playing on the wing in the 36–28 win at Cbus Super Stadium.

Nightingale was selected for the Kiwis for the 2012 Anzac Test against Australia on the wing in the Kiwis 20–12 loss at Eden Park.

Nightingale played in all of St. George's 24 matches and scored seven tries in the 2012 NRL season.

=== 2013 ===
Nightingale was selected for the Kiwis for the 2013 Anzac Test against Australia on the wing in the Kiwis 32–12 loss at Canberra Stadium.

In round 20, against the Canberra Raiders, Nightingale played his 150th NRL career match in St. George's 22–18 loss at Canberra Stadium. Nightingale played in all of St. George Illawarra's 24 matches and scored nine tries in the 2013 NRL season.

Nightingale played for the Kiwis in the 2013 Rugby League World Cup. Nightingale was selected in the New Zealand 2013 World Cup squad, playing in 2 matches.

=== 2014 ===
In February 2014, Nightingale was selected for St. George Illawarra's inaugural 2014 Auckland Nines squad. On 2 May 2014, Nightingale was selected for the Kiwis for the Anzac test against Australia on the wing in the Kiwis 30–18 loss at the SFS. Nightingale finished off the 2014 NRL season as St. George Illawarra's highest tryscorer with 16 tries in 22 matches.

On 7 October 2014, Nightingale was selected in the New Zealand Kiwis final 24-man squad for the 2014 Four Nations series. Nightingale played on the wing and scored a try in the Kiwis 22-18 Four Nations final win over Australia at Westpac Stadium. Nightingale finished as the tournament's top try scorer with five tries after 4 games.

=== 2015 ===
On 21 January 2015, Nightingale was named in St. George Illawarra's 2015 NRL Auckland Nines squad. On 3 May 2015, Nightingale was selected for the Kiwis for the 2015 Anzac Test against Australia on the wing in the Kiwis 26–12 win at Suncorp Stadium. On 19 June 2015, Nightingale re-signed with St. George Illawarra on a two-year contract until the end of the 2017 season after attracting offers from the New Zealand Warriors and the Cronulla-Sutherland Sharks. Nightingale finished the 2015 NRL season playing in 17 matches and scoring 5 tries for the Dragons.

On 8 October 2015, Nightingale was selected in the 23-man New Zealand squad to tour England. Nightingale played in all 3 matches against England on the wing and scored a try in the Kiwis' 2-1 Baskerville Shield series loss.

=== 2016 ===
In round 3, against the South Sydney Rabbitohs, Nightingale played his 200th NRL career match, scoring a try in St. George Illawarra's 8–6 win at the Sydney Cricket Ground. On 6 May 2016, Nightingale played for the New Zealand Kiwis against Australia, playing on the wing in the 16–0 loss at Hunter Stadium.

=== 2017 ===
Nightingale was one of five players to have played all 24 games for the St. George Illawarra Dragons in 2017 and for the third season, was the club's top tryscorer (with 16). Overall, Nightingale finished equal sixth for tries scored in the 2017 NRL season. In Round 16 against Newcastle, Nightingale scored his 100th try in a winning effort of 32–28 in a second-half comeback.

=== 2018 ===
On 9 August 2018, it was reported that Nightingale had announced his retirement from rugby league, effective at the end of 2018.

== Post playing ==
In 2024, Nightingale was made a life member of the St. George Illawarra Dragons.

In 2019, Nightingale formerly owned a coffee shop in Kogarah, he now works as a real estate agent

== See also ==
- List of players with 100 NRL tries
