= 2012 Anzac Test =

Rugby test match

New Zealand	Australia
12	20
	1	2	Total
NZL	6	6	12
AUS	14	6	20
- Date: 20 April 2012
- Stadium: Eden Park
- Location: Auckland, New Zealand
- Johnathan Thurston
- Referee: Richard Silverwood (England)
- Attendance: 35,399

Broadcast partners
- Broadcasters: Nine Network
- Commentators: Ray Warren; Phil Gould; Peter Sterling

The 2012 ANZAC test was a rugby league test match played between Australia and New Zealand at Eden Park on 20 April 2012. It was the 13th Anzac test played between the two nations.

Australian five-eighth, Johnathan Thurston scored a try and kicked four goals from four attempts, and was named man-of-the-match.

English referee Richard Silverwood's performance drew criticism in the media.

== Squads ==
Australia	Position	New Zealand
Billy Slater	Fullback	Josh Hoffman
Darius Boyd	Wing	Jason Nightingale
Greg Inglis	Centre	Shaun Kenny-Dowall
Justin Hodges	Centre	Simon Mannering
Akuila Uate	Wing	Manu Vatuvei
Johnathan Thurston	Five-Eighth	Benji Marshall (c)
Cooper Cronk	Halfback	Shaun Johnson
Paul Gallen	Prop	Sam McKendry
Cameron Smith (c)	Hooker	Isaac Luke
David Shillington	Prop	Ben Matulino
David Taylor	2nd Row	Frank Pritchard
Sam Thaiday	2nd Row	Adam Blair
Luke Lewis	Lock	Jeremy Smith
Daly Cherry-Evans	Interchange	Nathan Fien
Ben Hannant	Interchange	Jared Waerea-Hargreaves
James Tamou	Interchange	Jesse Bromwich
Anthony Watmough	Interchange	Alex Glenn
Tim Sheens	Coach	Stephen Kearney

== Match Summary ==
20 April 2012
8:00pm (BST)

Australia	20 – 12	New Zealand
Tries; Johnathan Thurston (21') 1 Greg Inglis (26') 1 Cameron Smith (69') 1 Goals; Johnathan Thurston 4/4 (22', 27', 40' pen, 71')		Tries; 1 (12') Issac Luke; 1 (48') Shaun Johnson; Goals; 2/2 (13', 48') Benji Marshall

Eden Park, Auckland
Attendance: 35,399
Referee: Richard Silverwood (England)
Player of the Match: Johnathan Thurston
