= 2011 Anzac Test =

2011 rugby league test match

Coordinates: 28°4′1″S 153°22′44″E

Australia	New Zealand
20	10
	1	2	Total
AUS	10	10	20
NZL	6	4	10
- Date: 6 May 2011
- Stadium: Skilled Park
- Location: Gold Coast, Queensland, Australia
- Paul Gallen
- Referee: Richard Silverwood (England)
- Attendance: 26,301

Broadcast partners
- Broadcasters: Nine Network
- Commentators: Ray Warren; Phil Gould; Peter Sterling

The 2011 ANZAC Test was a rugby league test match played between Australia and New Zealand on 6 May 2011 at Skilled Park on the Gold Coast. Australia won their tenth straight Anzac test with a score of 20–10.

== Pre-game ==
The game was originally scheduled to be played in AMI Stadium in Christchurch but was moved because of the damages from the 2011 Canterbury earthquake. However, 250 earthquake victims and volunteer workers were flown in for the match. to be commemorated.

New Zealand were given a chance by some pundits considering that they had beaten Australia in the 2008 Rugby League World Cup final and in the 2010 Four Nations. Winning the Anzac test was seen as the one achievement that eluded the New Zealand team. However, Australia went into the match as favorites, having won the last nine Anzac Tests and having never lost to New Zealand in an Anzac Test in Australia. The odds for an Australian win opened at $1.35 but dropped to $1.22 while New Zealand was paying $4.25.

The New Zealand national anthem was performed by J.Williams.

== Squads ==
Australia	Position	New Zealand
Billy Slater	Fullback	Lance Hohaia
Brett Morris	Wing	Matt Duffie
Greg Inglis	Centre	Simon Mannering
Justin Hodges	Centre	Shaun Kenny-Dowall
Jharal Yow Yeh	Wing	Jason Nightingale
Darren Lockyer (c)	Five-Eighth	Benji Marshall (c)
Johnathan Thurston	Halfback	Kieran Foran
Petero Civoniceva	Prop	Sam Rapira
Cameron Smith	Hooker	Nathan Fien
Matthew Scott	Prop	Sam McKendry
Ben Creagh	2nd Row	Adam Blair
Sam Thaiday	2nd Row	Bronson Harrison
Paul Gallen	Lock	Jeremy Smith
Cooper Cronk	Interchange	Issac Luke
Ben Hannant	Interchange	Ben Matulino
Jamal Idris	Interchange	Fuifui Moimoi
Kade Snowden*	Interchange	Lewis Brown
Tim Sheens	Coach	Stephen Kearney

*Replaced originally selected David Shillington who withdrew due to injury.

== Match summary ==
6 May 2011
8:00pm (BST)

Australia	20 – 10	New Zealand
Tries; Billy Slater (2', 68') 2 Jharal Yow Yeh (20') 1 Jamal Idris (71') 1 Goals; Johnathan Thurston 2/4 (3', 69')		Tries; 1 (36') Matt Duffie; 1 (80') Lance Hohaia; Goals; 1/2 (37') Benji Marshall

Skilled Park, Gold Coast
Attendance: 26,301
Referee: Richard Silverwood (England)
Player of the Match: Paul Gallen

New Zealand were criticized after the game for their unforgiving error rate, most notably for a period in the second half where five consecutive New Zealand errors allowed Australia to score two tries to secure their win. New Zealand coach Stephen Kearney said after the game "It seems a bit same old, same old – but I know we're taking steps in the right direction. The effort of the guys to keep hanging in there was a real positive.' New Zealand had at least proved that they could be competitive with Australia again.
