= 1997 Anzac Test =

1997 Rugby match

Australia (SL)	New Zealand
34	22
	1	2	Total
AUS	20	14	34
NZL	0	22	22
- Date: 25 April 1997
- Stadium: Sydney Football Stadium
- Location: Sydney, New South Wales, Australia
- Referee: Stuart Cummings (England)
- Attendance: 23,829

Broadcast partners
- Broadcasters: Nine Network (AUS) Fox Sports (AUS) Sky Sport (NZ) TV3 (NZ)
- Commentators: Greg Clark (Fox); Warren Smith (Fox); Peter Jackson (Fox); Graeme Hughes (Sky); Graham Lowe (Sky)

The 1997 ANZAC test was the first annual Anzac test played between Australia and New Zealand. Conceived by the rebel Super League competition, any players aligned with the Australian Rugby League were not available for selection. The game was played on ANZAC Day, 25 April 1997 at the Sydney Football Stadium in front of 23,829 and was won by Australia 34–22.

== Squads ==
Australia	Position	New Zealand
David Peachey	Fullback	Richie Barnett
Ken Nagas	Wing	Sean Hoppe
Andrew Ettingshausen	Centre	Ruben Wiki
Ryan Girdler	Centre	John Timu
Wendell Sailor	Wing	Daryl Halligan
Laurie Daley (c)	Five-eighth	Gene Ngamu
Allan Langer	Halfback	Stacey Jones
Glenn Lazarus	Prop	Grant Young
Craig Gower	Hooker	Syd Eru
Rodney Howe	Prop	Quentin Pongia
Brad Thorn	Second-row	Tony Iro
David Furner	Second-row	Stephen Kearney (c)
Darren Smith	Lock	Tawera Nikau
Paul Green	Interchange	Joe Vagana
Julian O'Neill	Interchange	Tyran Smith
Solomon Haumono	Interchange	Tea Ropati
Matt Adamson	Interchange	Robbie Paul
John Lang	Coach	Frank Endacott

== Match Summary ==
25 April 1997
7:30pm (AEST)

Australia	34 – 22	New Zealand
Tries; David Furner (2); Wendell Sailor (2); Darren Smith; Craig Gower; Goals; Ryan Girdler (5/7)		Tries; Stacey Jones; Daryl Halligan; Robbie Paul; Sean Hoppe; Goals; Daryl Halligan (3/4)

Sydney Football Stadium, Sydney
Attendance: 23,829
Referee: Stuart Cummings (England)
