= 2010 All Stars match =

Australian rugby league match

Coordinates: 28°4′1″S 153°22′44″E

2010 All Stars Game
Indigenous All Stars	NRL All Stars
16	12
	1	2	3	4	Total
INDIGENOUS	4	6	0	6	16
NRL	0	0	8	4	12
- Date: 13 February 2010
- Stadium: Skilled Park
- Location: Gold Coast, Queensland
- Preston Campbell Medal: Johnathan Thurston
- Referees: Ashley Klein, Shayne Hayne, Gavin Badger, Luke Phillips
- Attendance: 26,687

Broadcast partners
- Broadcasters: Nine Network

The 2010 All Stars Match was the first time the event was held. The match was a pre season game between representative teams, Indigenous Australians versus the best in the National Rugby League and took place at the Gold Coast's Skilled Park on 13 February 2010 in Queensland, Australia. The Indigenous team featured 20 players of aboriginal descent chosen by public votes. Preston Campbell was selected automatically as Indigenous captain. The NRL All Stars featured one player from each of the 16 NRL teams as well as the Australian and New Zealand captains and deputy captains. Along with other rule changes exclusive to the match, the game trialled a new "Double Try" rule where a team can choose to swap a conversion attempt for a second try attempt.

The maiden match was won by the Indigenous All Stars 16–12 with North Queensland Cowboys player Johnathan Thurston winning the inaugural Preston Campbell Medal for player of the match.

== Team lists ==
INDIGENOUS ALL STARS	Position	NRL ALL STARS
Preston Campbell (c)	Fullback	Jarryd Hayne
Nathan Merritt	Wing	Israel Folau
Blake Ferguson^{1}	Centre	Michael Jennings
Beau Champion^{6}	Centre	Matt Cooper
Wendell Sailor	Wing	Manu Vatuvei
Scott Prince	Five-Eighth	Darren Lockyer (c)
Johnathan Thurston	Halfback	Benji Marshall
George Rose	Prop	Adam Blair
Travis Waddell	Hooker	Cameron Smith
Carl Webb	Prop	Sam Burgess^{2}
Cory Paterson	2nd Row	Anthony Watmough
Greg Bird^{5}	2nd Row	Luke Bailey
Sam Thaiday	Lock	Luke O'Donnell
Jamie Soward	Interchange	Kurt Gidley
Yileen Gordon	Interchange	Anthony Tupou
Tom Learoyd-Lahrs	Interchange	Nate Myles
Jharal Yow Yeh	Interchange	Robbie Farah^{3}
Ben Jones^{7}	Interchange	David Shillington^{4}
Joel Thompson	Interchange	Josh Morris
Ty Williams^{9}	Interchange	Brett Finch^{8}
Neil Henry	Coach	Wayne Bennett

^{1} - Justin Hodges was originally selected but withdrew due to injury (replaced by Blake Ferguson).
^{2} - Dave Taylor was originally selected but withdrew due to injury (replaced by Sam Burgess) .
^{3} - Gareth Ellis was originally selected but withdrew for personal reasons (replaced by Robbie Farah).
^{4} - Alan Tongue was originally selected but withdrew due to injury (replaced by David Shillington).
^{5} - Daine Laurie was originally selected but withdrew due to injury (replaced by Greg Bird).
^{6} - Greg Inglis was originally selected but withdrew due to injury (replaced by Beau Champion).
^{7} - PJ Marsh was originally selected but withdrew due to injury (replaced by Ben Jones).
^{8} - Billy Slater was originally selected but withdrew due to injury (replaced by Brett Finch).
^{9} - Jamal Idris was originally selected but withdrew due to injury (replaced by Ty Williams).

== Result ==
13 February 2010
8:00pm (AEST)

Indigenous All Stars	16 – 12	NRL All Stars
Tries: Wendell Sailor (3') 1 Ben Jones (32') 1 Jamie Soward (74') 1 Goals: Johnathan Thurston 2/2 (34', 76'); Field Goals: Scott Prince 0/1	1st: 4 - 0; 2nd: 6 - 0; 3rd: 0 - 8; 4th: 6 - 4	Tries: Josh Morris (54') 1 Benji Marshall (59') 1 Michael Jennings (61') 1

Skilled Park
Gold Coast, Queensland
Attendance: 26,687
Preston Campbell Medal: Johnathan Thurston
Referee: Shayne Hayne, Ashley Klein, Gavin Badger, Luke Phillips

== Selection process ==
=== NRL All Stars ===
Default selections

The following four players were automatically selected to the All Stars team due their captain or vice-captain roles for their Australian or New Zealand team.

- Australian captain (Broncos): Darren Lockyer (captain)
- Australian vice-captain (Storm): Cameron Smith
- New Zealand captain (Tigers): Benji Marshall
- New Zealand vice-captain (Storm): Adam Blair

Selected by public vote

The following were selected by the public through the official NRL website. Voters were required to select one forward-position player and one back-position player from all sixteen teams. The most voted player from their respected position of each team were selected to the All Stars team.

- Broncos – Israel Folau
- Bulldogs – Josh Morris
- Cowboys – Luke O'Donnell
- Dragons – Matt Cooper
- Eels – Jarryd Hayne
- Knights – Kurt Gidley
- Panthers – Michael Jennings
- Rabbitohs – David Taylor
- Raiders – Alan Tongue
- Roosters – Nate Myles
- Sea Eagles – Anthony Watmough
- Sharks – Anthony Tupou
- Storm – Billy Slater
- Tigers – Gareth Ellis
- Titans – Luke Bailey
- Warriors – Manu Vatuvei

The following players were called up due to injuries or other causes to the initial squad. The second highest voted player for their forward or back positions of their team were called to the squad.

- Rabbitohs – David Taylor replaced by Sam Burgess.
- Tigers – Gareth Ellis replaced by Robbie Farah.
- Raiders – Alan Tongue replaced by David Shillington
- Storm – Billy Slater replaced by Brett Finch

=== Indigenous All Stars Squad ===
Default Selection

- Titans – Preston Campbell (captain)

ARL Indigenous Council selected players

- Broncos – Jharal Yow Yeh
- Raiders – Joel Thompson
- Raiders – Travis Waddell

Selected by public vote

- Broncos – Justin Hodges
- Broncos – PJ Marsh
- Broncos – Sam Thaiday
- Bulldogs – Jamal Idris
- Bulldogs –Yileen Gordon
- Cowboys – Carl Webb
- Cowboys – Johnathan Thurston
- Dragons – Jamie Soward
- Knights – Cory Paterson
- Panthers – Daine Laurie
- Rabbitohs – Nathan Merritt
- Raiders – Tom Learoyd-Lahrs
- Sea Eagles – George Rose
- Storm – Greg Inglis
- Titans – Scott Prince
- Wendell Sailor (retired)

The following players were called up due to injuries to the initial squad.

- Broncos – Justin Hodges replaced by Sharks – Blake Ferguson
- Panthers – Daine Laurie replaced by Titans – Greg Bird
- Storm – Greg Inglis replaced by Rabbitohs – Beau Champion
- Broncos – PJ Marsh replaced by Roosters – Ben Jones
- Bulldogs – Jamal Idris replaced by Cowboys – Ty Williams

=== Injuries ===
For the Indigenous All Stars, Justin Hodges who had ruptured his Achilles heel at Broncos training, was replaced by Blake Ferguson, Daine Laurie injured himself and was replaced by Greg Bird and Greg Inglis had a hip injury and was replaced by Beau Champion. PJ Marsh withdrew due to back spasms and was replaced by Ben Jones. Jamal Idris injured himself and was replaced by Ty Williams.

In the NRL All Stars, David Taylor injured his ankle at training and was replaced by Sam Burgess, Gareth Ellis was sent home on compassionate grounds because of the birth of his first child and was replaced by Robbie Farah and Alan Tongue injured himself and was replaced by David Shillington. Billy Slater withdrew due to an ankle injury and was replaced by Brett Finch.
