= Daine Laurie =

Daine Laurie may refer to:

- Daine Laurie (rugby league, born 1999)
- Daine Laurie (rugby league, born 1984)
