= Tristan Sailor =

Australian rugby league footballer

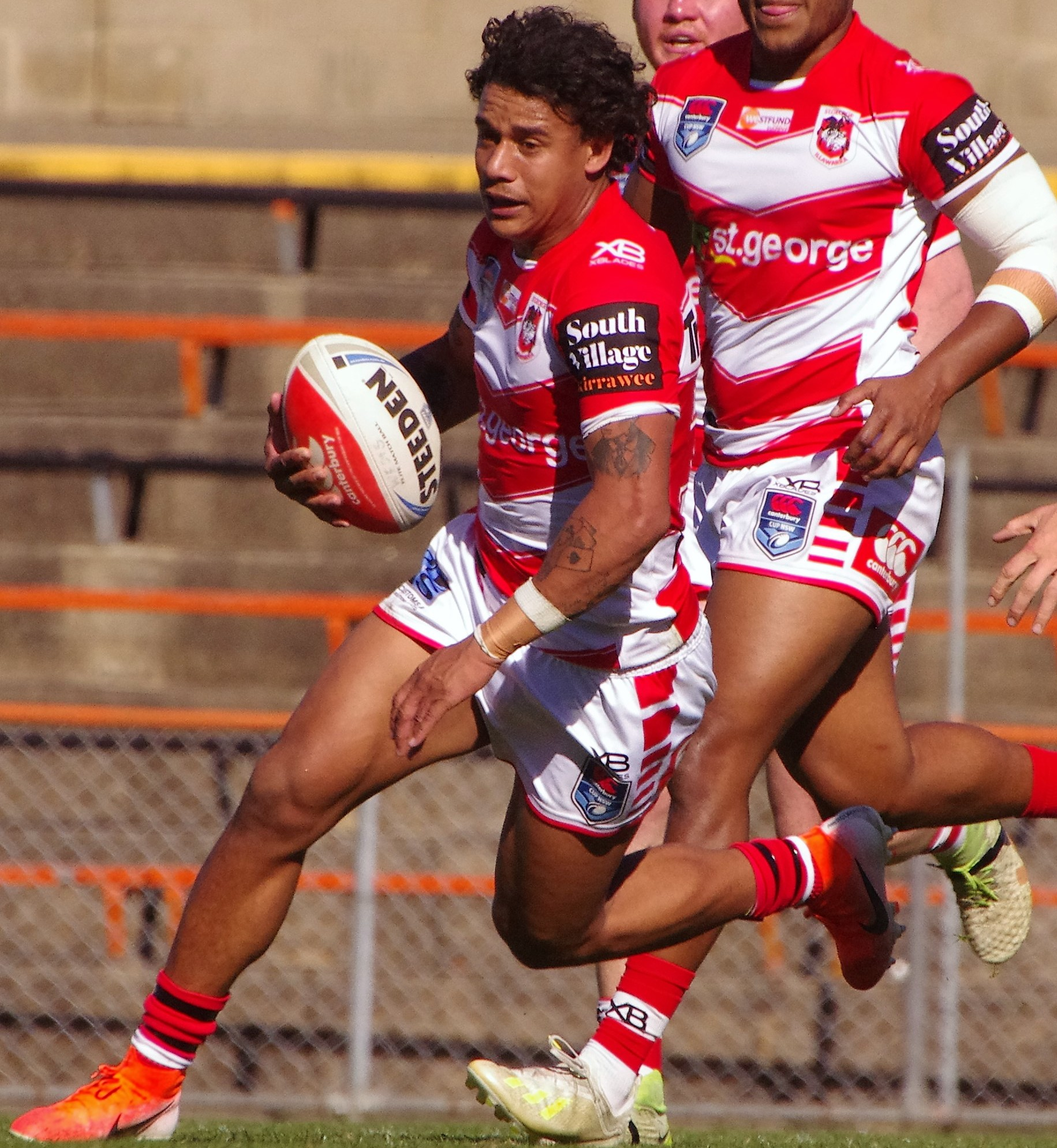

Personal information
- Born: 23 June 1998 (age 28) Brisbane, Queensland Australia
- Height: 5 ft 10 in (1.79 m)
- Weight: 13 st 5 lb (85 kg)

Playing information
- Position: Fullback, stand-off, Wing
Club
Years	Team	Pld	T	G	FG	P
2019–20	St. George Illawarra	5	1	0	0	4
2023–24	Brisbane Broncos	16	1	0	0	4
2025–	St Helens	63	33	27	0	186
	Total	84	35	27	0	194
- Source: As of 23 August 2026
- Father: Wendell Sailor
- Relatives: Dane Gagai (cousin); Jacob Gagai (cousin); Josh Hoffman (cousin); Travis Waddell (cousin)

Tristan Sailor (born 23 June 1998) is an Australian professional rugby league footballer who plays as a fullback and stand-off for St Helens in the Super League.

He previously played for the Brisbane Broncos and St. George Illawarra in the NRL.

== Background ==
Sailor was born in Brisbane into a family of Torres Strait Islanders & Solomon Island descendants. His father, a Solomon island descendant Wendell, was a dual international who played more than 300 combined professional games across the two codes of rugby. At the age of seven, Sailor moved to Sydney with his family before settling in Wollongong two years later and began playing junior rugby league for the Western Suburbs Red Devils in the Illawarra Rugby League. Despite spending the majority of his upbringing in New South Wales, Sailor's State of Origin eligibility for Queensland was confirmed in 2014 when the NRL introduced a father-son rule. Sailor confirmed later in 2014 that he had always wanted to represent Queensland.

== Career ==
=== St George Illawarra Dragons ===
Sailor made his first grade debut in round 23 of the 2019 NRL season for St George against the Sydney Roosters scoring a try in a 34-12 loss at Kogarah Oval.

On 29 September 2019, Sailor was named in the 2019 Canterbury Cup NSW team of the season.

He was released by St. George Illawarra at the end of the 2020 NRL season.

After being released by the club, Sailor's father Wendell Sailor spoke to the media and voiced his anger at his son being released, saying he was told by the club that if he had a big off-season, he would be in the mix this year but he never got any game time.”

=== Souths Logan Magpies ===
In April 2022, Souths Logan Magpies in the Queensland Cup competition announced they had signed Sailor for the rest of the season.

=== Brisbane Broncos ===
On 16 December 2022, it was announced that Sailor had joined Brisbane on a train and trial contract ahead of the 2023 NRL season.

In round 13 of the 2023 NRL season, Sailor made his debut for the Brisbane Broncos against the New Zealand Warriors, playing at fullback. He had an impressive debut with the Brisbane outfit winning 26–22 without their State of Origin representative players. Sailor made a try saving tackle in the first half and set up the decisive try from a clever grubber kick in the second half. He played his second game for Brisbane against the Dolphins in round 18 which the Brisbane club won 24–16 at The Gabba. Sailor played a total of four matches with Brisbane in the 2023 NRL season but did not feature in their finals campaign nor grand final loss against Penrith. In round 4 of the 2024 NRL season, Sailor made his first start of the year in the club's 38-12 victory over arch-rivals North Queensland. On 4 April 2024, Sailor's father Wendell launched another attack on Sailor's former club St. George Illawarra saying “The way Tristan got treated at the Dragons was disgusting, Other Dragons kids have been let go … the culture of the club hasn’t been good since Wayne (Bennett) left, “Tristan loved the Dragons more than me, they picked Corey Norman and that’s fine, I understood that, but Tristan went from starting, to the bench, to 18th man, to No. 21 and 22 and out of the squad with no reason at all as to why. Then before a game against the Storm – their last game of the (2020) season – a Dragons official walks up to Tristan and says, ‘Thanks for your service, we no longer need you at this club, we’re going in a different direction’ Seriously, what a joke".

=== St Helens ===
On 8 August 2024, Sailor signed a two-year deal with English side St Helens starting in 2025. In round 1 of the 2025 Super League season, Sailor made his official club debut for St Helens and scored four tries in their 82-0 victory over Salford. Sailor played 29 games for St Helens in the 2025 Super League season including their 20-12 semi-final loss against Hull Kingston Rovers. On 7 February 2026, Sailor scored a hat-trick for St Helens in their 98-2 victory over Workington Town in the third round of the Challenge Cup. On 18 June 2026, Sailor signed a three-year contract extension with St Helens. In round 23 of the 2026 Super League season, Sailor scored a hat-trick in St Helens upset 46-16 victory over Wakefield Trinity. Sailor played 27 matches for St Helens in the 2026 Super League season as the club finished 7th on the table and missed the playoffs for the first time in the Super League era.

== Controversy ==
On 10 October 2020, Sailor was arrested and charged with aggravated sexual assault against a woman in a house in Sydney. On 31 March 2022, Sailor was found not guilty on all charges.
