= Jacob Gagai =

Australian rugby league footballer

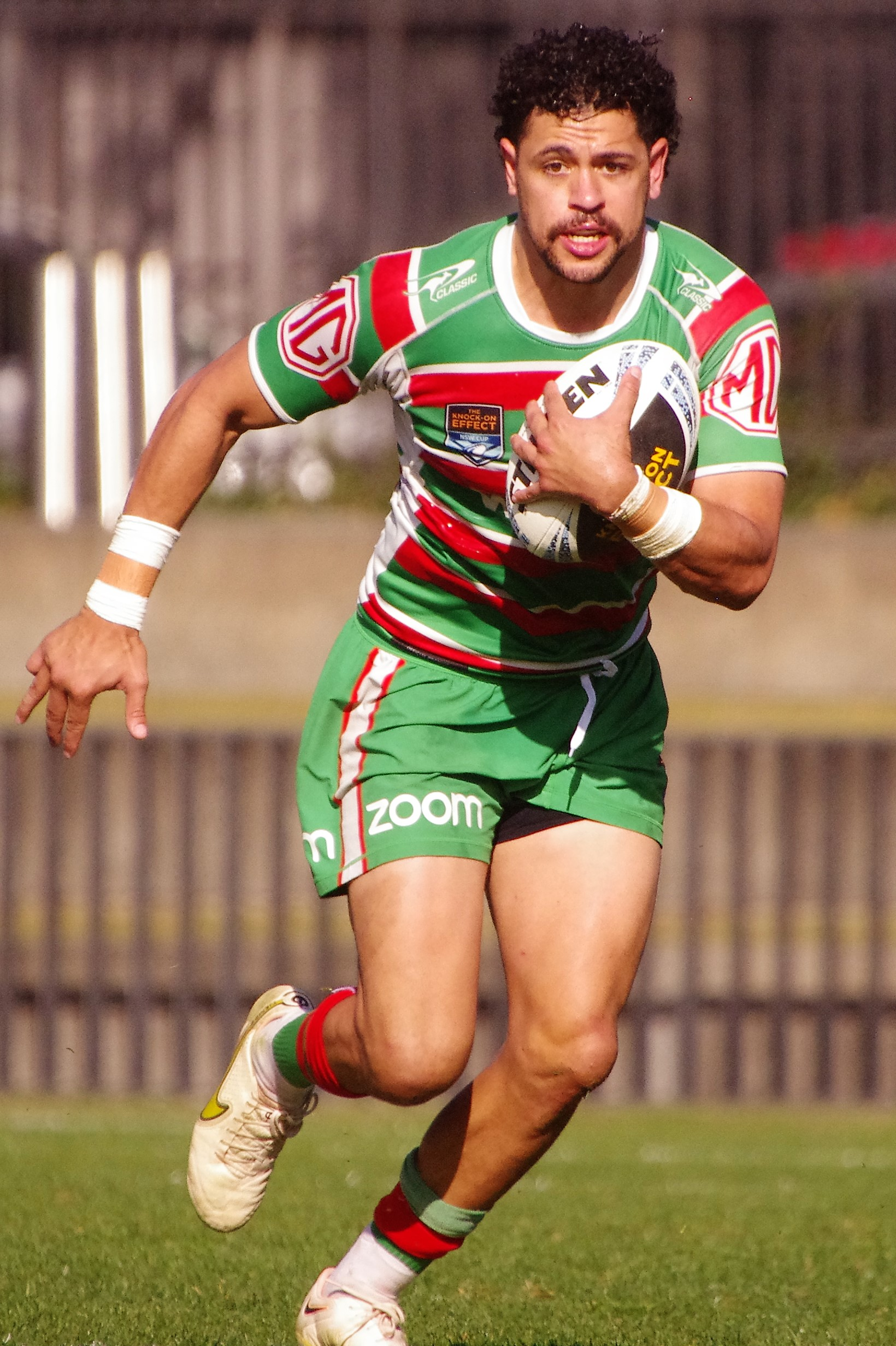

Personal information
- Full name: Jacob Gagai
- Born: 20 December 1995 (age 30) Mackay, Queensland, Australia
- Height: 6 ft 0 in (1.83 m)
- Weight: 14 st 7 lb (92 kg)

Playing information
- Position: Wing, Fullback, Centre
Club
Years	Team	Pld	T	G	FG	P
2024	South Sydney	17	9	0	0	36
2025–26	Huddersfield Giants	53	26	0	0	104
2027–	Warrington Wolves	0	0	0	0	0
	Total	70	35	0	0	140
- Source: As of 15 November 2026
- Father: Ray Gagai
- Relatives: Dane Gagai (brother); Josh Hoffman (cousin); Travis Waddell (cousin); Wendell Sailor (cousin); Tristan Sailor (cousin)

Jacob Gagai (born 20 December 1995) is an Australian professional rugby league footballer who plays as a winger for the Warrington Wolves in the Super League.

== Background ==
He is the younger brother of Newcastle Knights player, Dane Gagai. He is of Indigenous Australian descent from the Badu and Yam Island people.

Growing up he also played rugby union.

== Playing career ==
=== South Sydney Rabbitohs ===
Gagai made his first grade debut for South Sydney against Manly in round 1 of the 2024 NRL season at the Allegiant Stadium in Las Vegas. Gagai scored a try in South Sydney's 36-24 loss. In round 8 of the 2024 NRL season, Gagai scored two tries for South Sydney in their 54-20 loss against Melbourne. In round 18, Gagai scored two tries for South Sydney in their 32-16 victory over Parramatta. The following week, he scored a hat-trick in South Sydney's 36-28 loss against the Dolphins. Gagai played 17 games for the club in the 2024 season and scored nine tries as they finished 16th on the table. On 23 October 2024, Gagai was told his services were no longer required by the South Sydney club.

=== Huddersfield Giants ===
On 14 November 2024, it was announced that Gagai had signed a two-year contract with Huddersfield in the Super League. Gagai played 26 games for Huddersfield in the 2025 Super League season as the club finished 10th on the table.

=== Warrington Wolves ===
On 9 September 2026 it was reported that he had signed for Warrington Wolves in the Super League on a 2-year deal.

== Statistics ==
Year	Team	Games	Tries	Pts
2024	South Sydney Rabbitohs	17	9	36
2025	Huddersfield Giants	26	11	44
2026	Huddersfield Giants	27	15	60
2027	Warrington Wolves			
	Totals	70	35	140
