= Dane Gagai =

Australia & NZ international rugby league footballer (born 1991)

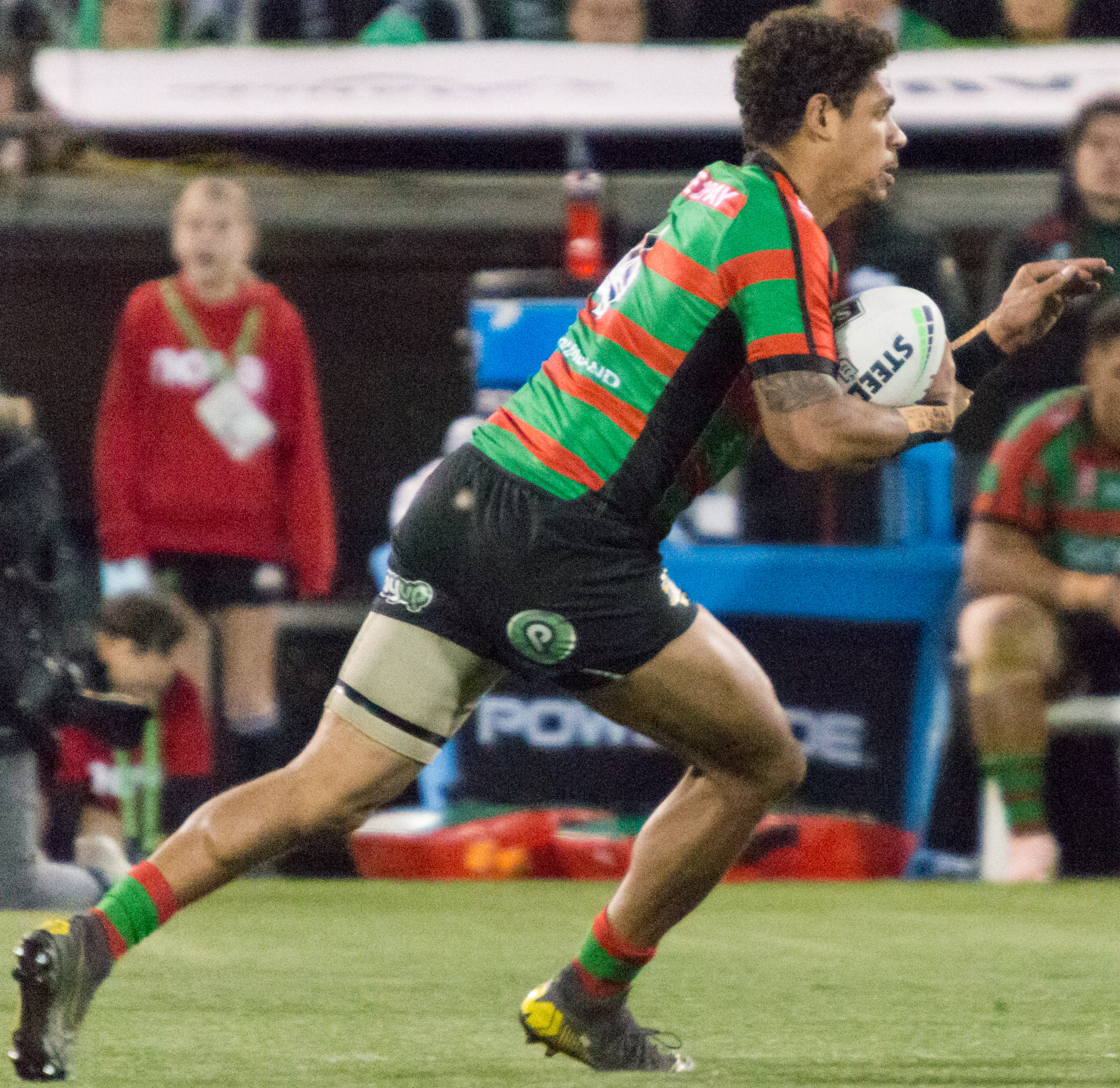

Personal information
- Born: 3 January 1991 (age 35) Mackay, Queensland, Australia
- Height: 182 cm (6 ft 0 in)
- Weight: 92 kg (14 st 7 lb)

Playing information
- Position: Centre, Wing, Fullback
Club
Years	Team	Pld	T	G	FG	P
2011	Brisbane Broncos	6	4	0	0	16
2012–17	Newcastle Knights	128	29	3	0	122
2018–21	South Sydney Rabbitohs	92	35	8	0	156
2022–26	Newcastle Knights	114	25	32	0	164
2027–	Brisbane Broncos	0	0	0	0	0
	Total	340	93	43	0	458
Representative
Years	Team	Pld	T	G	FG	P
2015–17	Indigenous All Stars	3	2	0	0	8
2015–24	Queensland	23	12	0	0	48
2015	Prime Minister's XIII	1	0	0	0	0
2017–18	Australia	7	4	0	0	16
2019–25	Māori All Stars	3	2	1	0	10
2026–	New Zealand	4	2	0	0	8
- Source: As of 22 November 2026
- Father: Ray Gagai
- Relatives: Jacob Gagai (brother); Josh Hoffman (cousin); Travis Waddell (cousin); Wendell Sailor (cousin); Tristan Sailor (cousin)

Dane Gagai (/ˈɡæɡaɪ/; born 3 January 1991) is a professional rugby league footballer who plays as a centre for the Brisbane Broncos in the National Rugby League, the Queensland Maroons in the State of Origin series, New Zealand and the Māori All Stars.

He previously played for the, Brisbane Broncos, and South Sydney Rabbitohs in the NRL. He played as a winger for Australia and a centre for New Zealand at International level from 2017-18, winning the 2017 Rugby League World Cup. He previously represented the Indigenous All Stars and the Prime Minister's XIII. In 2017 he won the Wally Lewis Medal as State of Origin Player of the Series. Earlier in his career he played as a fullback.

== Background ==
Gagai was born in Mackay, Queensland, Australia. He is of Torres Strait Islander heritage through his father's family (Yam Island and Badu Island people) and Ngati Pikiao Maori descent by way of his mother's ancestry. Gagai was eligible to play for both Australia and New Zealand through parents of Indigenous Australian and Māori.

Gagai's father, Ray, was a member of the Brisbane Broncos' squad in the 1989 NSWRL season. He is also the cousin of former New Zealand test player Josh Hoffman, former Broncos player Wendell Sailor and former Broncos player Travis Waddell. His brother Jacob Gagai plays for the Warrington Wolves in the Super League.

He attended Brisbane Boys' College where he played rugby union and then played his junior rugby league for Brisbane Wests before being signed by the Brisbane Broncos.

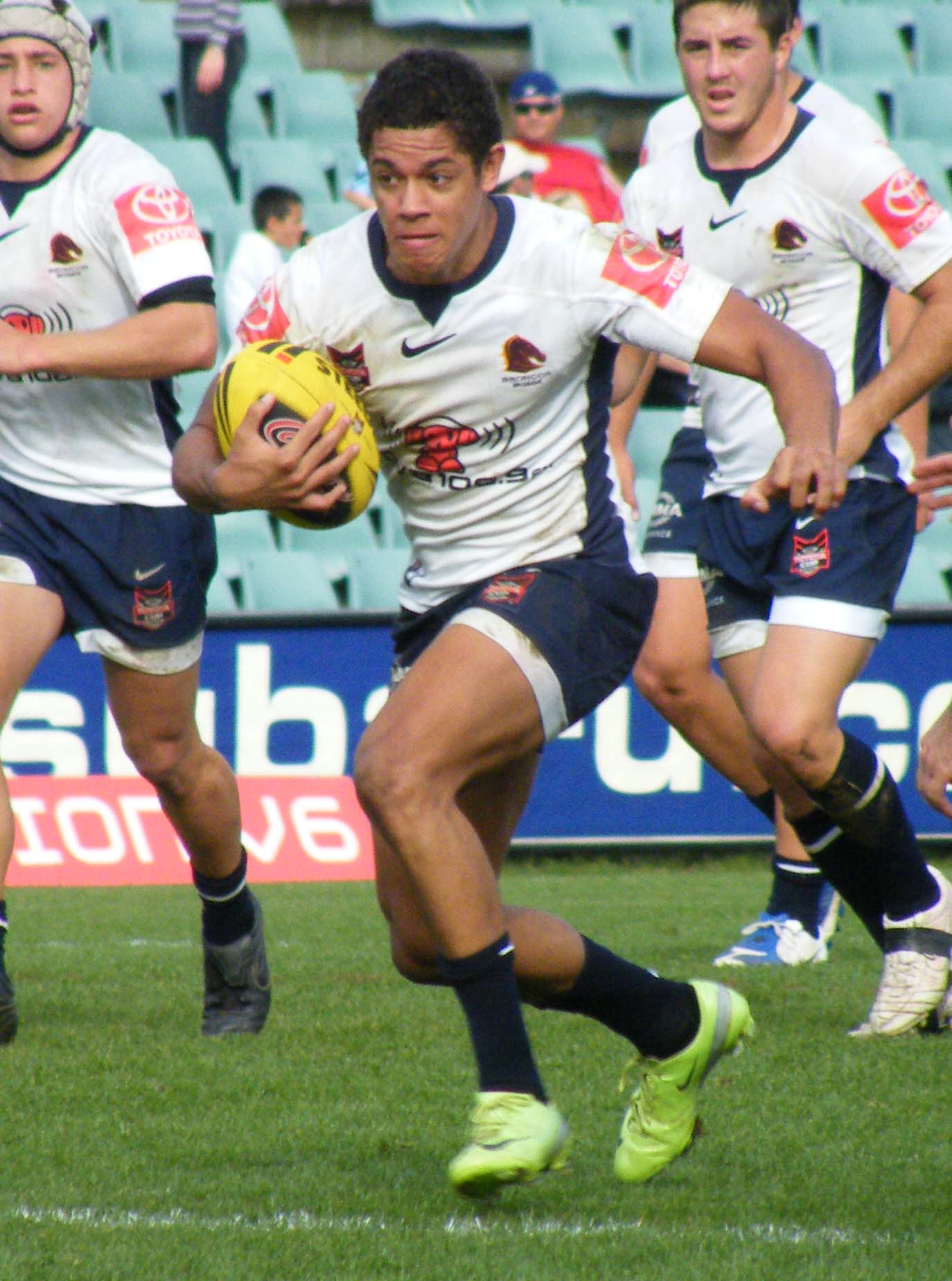
Gagai playing for the Broncos in 2009

== Playing career ==
=== Early career ===
From 2009 to 2011, Gagai played for the Brisbane Broncos' NYC team, scoring 39 tries in 61 games. At the end of 2010, he was named at fullback in the 2010 NYC Team of the Year and played for the Junior Kangaroos against the Junior Kiwis.

=== 2011 ===
In round 1, Gagai made his NRL debut for the Brisbane Broncos against the North Queensland Cowboys on the wing, scoring a try in the 16–14 loss at Suncorp Stadium.

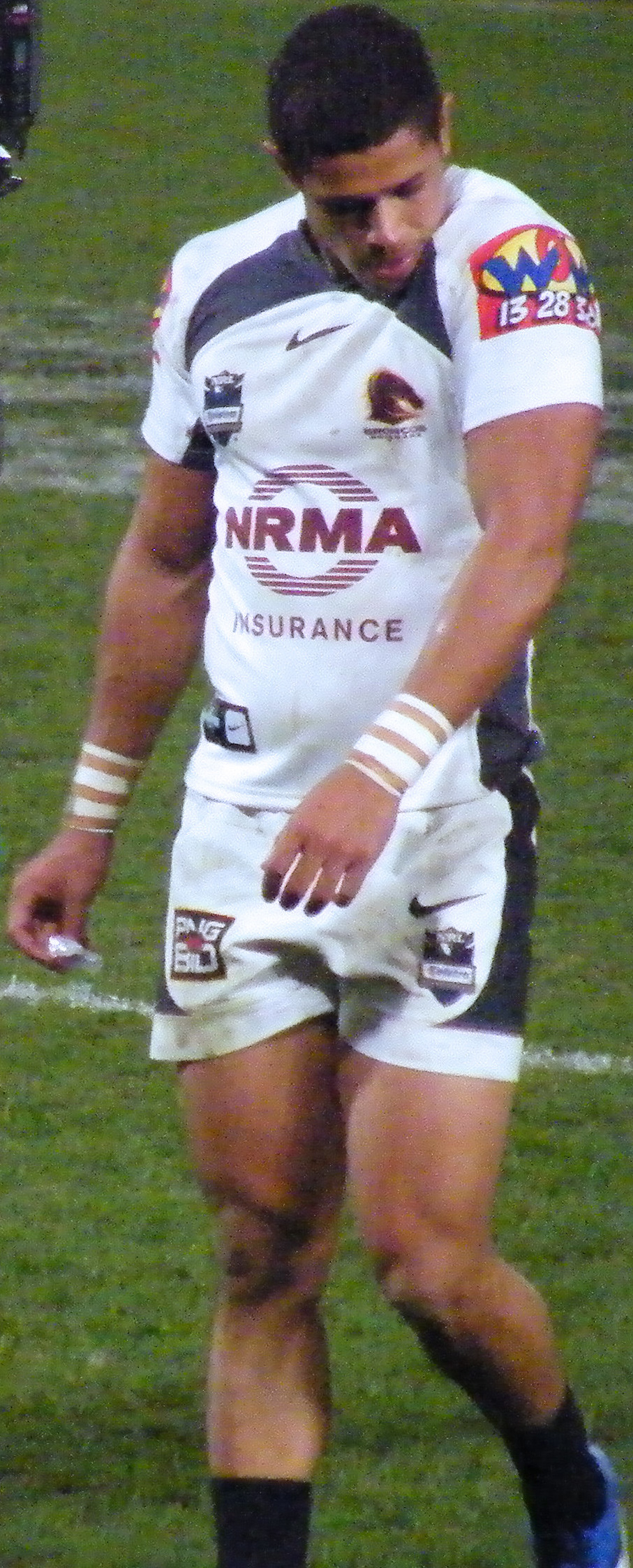
Gagai playing for Brisbane in 2011

Gagai finished his debut year in the NRL with 4 tries in 6 matches. He was again named in the NYC Team of the Year, this time at wing.

=== 2012 ===
On 19 March, Gagai re-signed with Brisbane on a two-year contract. On 9 May, he was released from the contract due to disciplinary reasons. On 28 May, Gagai signed a 2-year contract with the Newcastle Knights effective immediately. In Round 14 of the 2012 NRL season, Gagai made his club debut for the Newcastle Knights against the Canberra Raiders at centre, scoring a try in the Knights 32–16 loss at Hunter Stadium. Gagai finished his first year in the Newcastle Knights with 12 matches and 5 tries.

=== 2013 ===
On 22 May, Gagai re-signed with Newcastle on a two-year contract. he finished the season with 23 matches and scoring 5 tries. In August, Gagai rejected playing for New Zealand in the 2013 Rugby League World Cup, instead setting his sights to play for Queensland in State of Origin.

=== 2014 ===
On 28 January, Gagai was banned from the Queensland Origin camp by Mal Meninga after a discipline breach. In February, Gagai was selected in the Knights inaugural Nines squad. In June, he was included in the Queensland Maroons extended 22-man squad but was later not chosen to make his debut for Queensland. Gagai played in all of the Knights 24 matches, scoring 7 tries and kicking a goal.

=== 2015 ===
In the pre-season, Gagai played for the Knights in the 2015 NRL Auckland Nines and the Indigenous All Stars in the annual All Stars match, playing off the interchange bench. The Indigenous side won 20–6.

On 10 April, he re-signed with Newcastle on a two-year contract after strong interest from his former club Brisbane Broncos. On 8 July, he made his State of Origin debut on the wing for Queensland in Game 3 of the 2015 State of Origin series, scoring the first try of the game, in Queensland's 52–6 win. He finished the 2015 season having played in all of the Knights 24 matches, scoring 7 tries and kicking 2 goals as the club finished last.

On 26 September, he played for the Prime Minister's XIII against Papua New Guinea, playing at centre in his team's 40–12 win in Port Moresby.

=== 2016 ===
On 13 February, Gagai again played for the Indigenous All Stars against the new World All Stars, playing on the wing and scoring a try in his team's 8–12 loss at Suncorp Stadium.

In round 10 against the Cronulla-Sutherland Sharks, Gagai played his 100th NRL career game in the Knights' 0–62 loss at Hunter Stadium. After the match, he was seen on camera crying and being embraced by teammate Tariq Sims. Fox Sports commentators Andrew Voss, Jimmy Smith and Mark Gasnier commented on the incident: "Right there at the finish, I don't think I've ever seen the likes of that in all my time following rugby league," said Voss. "Dane Gagai just couldn't contain himself. This is a round 10 game. Have you ever witnessed that in your life? They were incredible pictures," said Smith. "That is a reaction you just don't see. He was shattered," said Gasnier. After the incident, Gagai was exposed to racial abuse from a crowd member. It was later revealed that Gagai was upset due to the death of his grandmother earlier that day.

He played in all 3 matches for Queensland on the wing in the 2016 State of Origin series, where he scored 1 try in Game 1 in Queensland's 6–4 win at ANZ Stadium and a hat-trick of tries in Game 2 in their 26–16 win at Suncorp Stadium.

He finished the season having played in 22 matches and scoring 3 tries as Newcastle finished last on the table and claimed the wooden spoon for a second consecutive year.

=== 2017 ===
Gagai made his third consecutive appearance for the Indigenous All Stars, starting on the wing and scoring a try in the 34–8 win.

On 10 June, Gagai announced that he signed a four-year deal with the South Sydney Rabbitohs from 2018.

On 12 July, Gagai won the Wally Lewis Medal as the player of the 2017 State of Origin series. Gagai, who played on the wing for Queensland in all 3 games, scored 2 tries in Game 2 in the series-tying 18–16 win at ANZ Stadium and ran for over 500 metres for the series. He became the first winger to win the official Player of the series.

Gagai finished his last year with the Newcastle Knights with him playing in 23 matches and scoring 2 tries as Newcastle finished last for a third consecutive year. On 3 October, he was selected in the 24-man Australia Kangaroos 2017 Rugby League World Cup squad. On 27 October, Gagai made his international debut for Australia against England, playing on the wing in the 18–4 win at AAMI Park. In his next match against Lebanon, Gagai scored his first international try in the 34–0 win at Sydney Football Stadium. Gagai played in 5 matches and scored 3 tries in the tournament including starting on the wing in the Kangaroos gritty 6-0 World Cup final victory over England at Suncorp Stadium.

=== 2018 ===
In round 1 of the 2018 season, Gagai made his club debut for South Sydney against the New Zealand Warriors, playing at centre in South Sydney's 20–32 loss at Perth Stadium.

In round 9 against his old club Newcastle, he scored his first try for Souths in their 36–18 win at McDonald Jones Stadium. During the 2018 All-Stars match at AAMI Park, Melbourne, Gagai was eligible to play for both representative teams as he had Torres Strait Island and Maori heritage. Gagai was then selected to the Maori All-Stars Team.

=== 2019 ===
Before the 2019 NRL season started Gagai chose to play for New Zealand Maori kiwis against the Indigenous Australian All Stars and in that game he scored two tries.

In Game 1 of the 2019 State of Origin series, Gagai scored 2 tries and won man of the match in Queensland's 18–14 victory at Suncorp Stadium. After the match, Gagai finished with 256 run metres, two linebreaks, three tackle breaks and 11 tackles. In round 19 against St. George, Gagai scored two tries as South Sydney won the match 20-16 after the final siren had sounded.

Gagai finished the 2019 NRL season playing 25 games and scoring 10 tries. He played in the club's preliminary final defeat against the Canberra Raiders as the club fell short of a grand final appearance for the second year in a row.

=== 2020 ===
In round 5 of the 2020 NRL season, Gagai scored two tries as South Sydney defeated the Gold Coast 32–12 at Bankwest Stadium. In round 8, Gagai scored the match winning try for Souths as they defeated Canterbury 26–10 at Bankwest Stadium. In round 9, Gagai scored his first NRL hat trick as Souths defeated the West Tigers 18–10 at Bankwest Stadium.

In round 18 against Wests Tigers, Gagai scored a try but was later sent to the sin bin after throwing the ball at Wests player Luke Brooks. Brooks retaliated punching Gagai in the face before the pair traded punches sparking an all in brawl. Souths would go on to win the match 26–24.

Gagai finished the season with 19 appearances and 11 tries. He played in the club's preliminary final defeat against Penrith as Souths fell at that stage in the competition for a third year in a row.

=== 2021 ===
In round 12 of the 2021 NRL season, Gagai scored a hat-trick in South Sydney's 38-20 victory over Parramatta. On 9 August, it was announced that Gagai had signed a three-year deal to rejoin Newcastle in 2022. Gagai played a total of 23 games for South Sydney in the 2021 NRL season including the club's 2021 NRL Grand Final defeat against Penrith.

=== 2022 ===
In Game 3 of the 2022 State of Origin series, Gagai was sent to the sin bin for punching New South Wales player Matt Burton during Queensland's 22-12 victory. In round 19 of the 2022 NRL season, Gagai was sent to the sin bin for dissent during Newcastle's 42-12 loss against the Sydney Roosters. In round 24, Gagai scored two tries for Newcastle in their 26-36 defeat to the Gold Coast. Gagai played a total of 20 games for Newcastle in 2022 as the club finished 14th on the table.

=== 2023 ===
Gagai played a total of 22 games for Newcastle in the 2023 NRL season as the club finished 5th on the table. Gagai played in both finals games as Newcastle were eliminated in the second week of the finals by the New Zealand Warriors.

=== 2024 ===
In round 25 of the 2024 NRL season, Gagai scored two tries for Newcastle in their 36-16 victory over South Sydney. Gagai played 22 games for Newcastle in the 2024 NRL season as the club finished 8th and qualified for the finals. He played in their elimination finals loss against North Queensland. On 8 November, Gagai re-signed with the Newcastle outfit for a further two years.

=== 2025 ===
In round 11 of the 2025 NRL season, Gagai played his 300th first grade game in Newcastle's 28-6 loss against Parramatta. On 29 July, the Knights announced that Gagai had re-signed with the club for a further year. Gagai played a total of 24 games for Newcastle in the 2025 NRL season as the club finished with the wooden spoon for the fifth time in their history. It was also Gagai's fourth wooden spoon as a player.

=== 2026 ===
On 25 June 2026, the Broncos announced that Gagai had signed with the club for the 2027 season.

On 12 July 2026, Dane Gagai played his 331st NRL game, surpassing Nathan Hindmarsh's record for most NRL games without a premiership.

He made his New Zealand début in the 24-22 2026 Rugby League World Cup opening defeat to Australia on 15 October 2026.

== Accolades ==
Wally Lewis Medal: 2017

== Career statistics ==
=== Club ===
Year	Club	Games	Tries	Goals	Pts
2011	Brisbane Broncos	6	4		16
2012	Newcastle Knights	12	5		20
2013	Newcastle Knights	23	5		20
2014	Newcastle Knights	24	7	1	30
2015	Newcastle Knights	24	7	2	32
2016	Newcastle Knights	22	3		12
2017	Newcastle Knights	23	2		8
2018	South Sydney Rabbitohs	25	4		16
2019	South Sydney Rabbitohs	25	10	7	54
2020	South Sydney Rabbitohs	19	11	1	46
2021	South Sydney Rabbitohs	23	10		40
2022	Newcastle Knights	20	5		20
2023	Newcastle Knights	22	4	1	18
2024	Newcastle Knights	22	8	10	52
2025	Newcastle Knights	24	2	20	48
2026	Newcastle Knights	26	6		24
2027	Brisbane Broncos				
	Totals	340	93	43	458

=== Representative ===
Years	Team	Appearances	Tries	Goals	Goal-kicking percentage	Field goals	Points
2015−2024	Queensland	21	12	-	-	-	48
2017−2018	Australia	7	4	-	-	-	16
2015−2017	Indigenous All-Stars	3	2	-	-	-	8
2019–2025	Maori All-Stars	2	2	-	-	-	8
