= Dave Taylor (rugby league) =

Australia international rugby league player

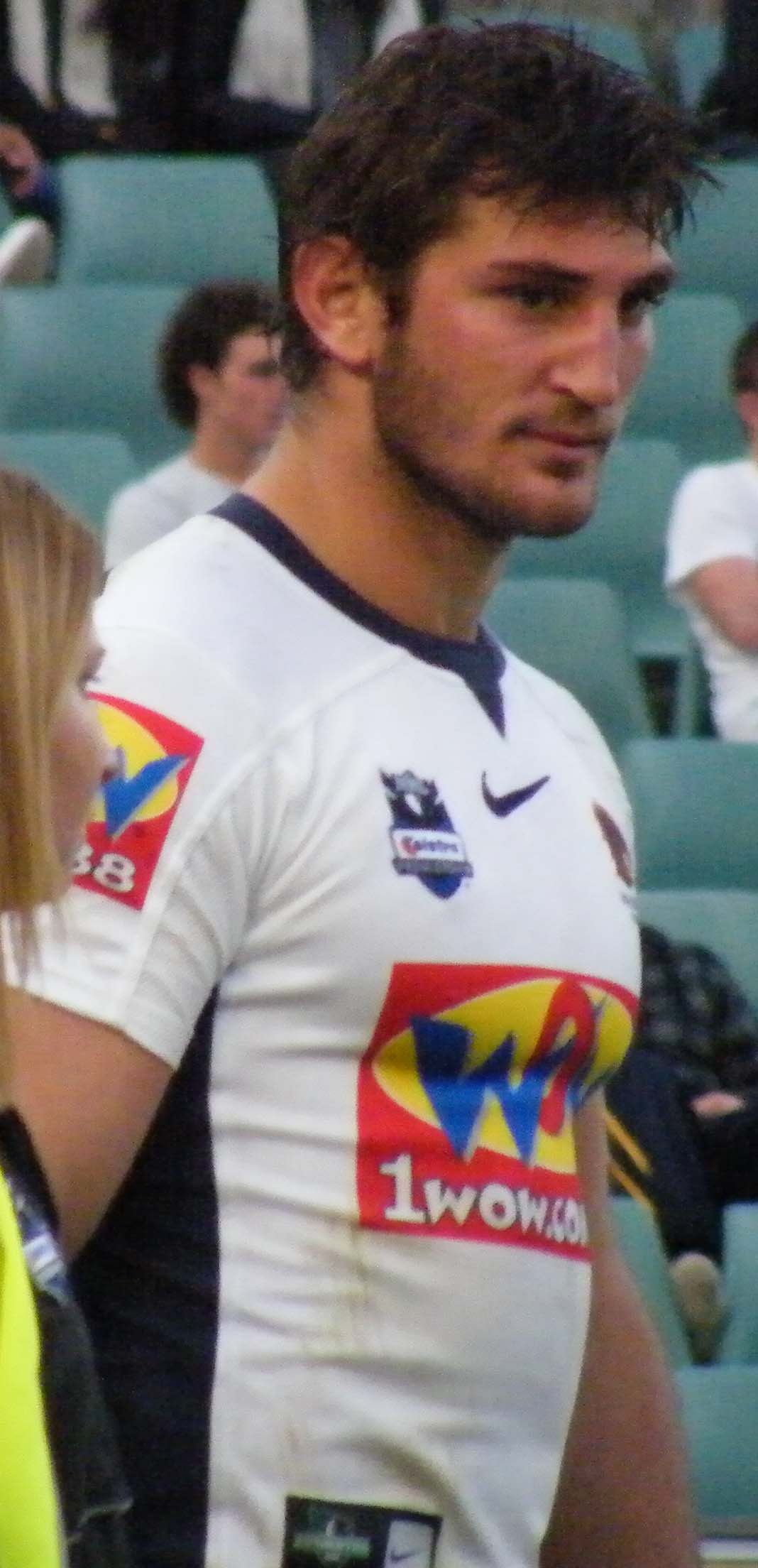

Personal information
- Full name: David Taylor
- Born: 8 July 1988 (age 38) Rockhampton, Queensland, Australia
- Height: 187 cm (6 ft 2 in)
- Weight: 123 kg (19 st 5 lb)

Playing information
- Position: Second-row, Prop
Club
Years	Team	Pld	T	G	FG	P
2006–09	Brisbane Broncos	49	9	0	0	36
2010–12	South Sydney	63	18	0	0	72
2013–15	Gold Coast Titans	58	15	0	0	60
2016	Catalans Dragons	26	9	0	0	36
2017	Canberra Raiders	11	0	0	0	0
	Total	207	51	0	0	204
Representative
Years	Team	Pld	T	G	FG	P
2007	Queensland Residents	1	1	0	0	4
2010	Prime Minister's XIII	1	0	0	0	0
2011–12	NRL All Stars	2	0	0	0	0
2010–14	Queensland	8	0	0	0	0
2012	Australia	1	0	0	0	0
- Source: As of 4 January 2024

David Taylor (born 8 July 1988), also nicknamed "Coal Train", is an Australian former professional rugby league footballer who played as a second-row and prop in the NRL and the Super League in the 2000s and 2010s.

A Queensland State of Origin and Australia international representative, during his career he played for the Brisbane Broncos, South Sydney Rabbitohs, Gold Coast Titans and Canberra Raiders in the NRL, and the Catalans Dragons in the Super League.

== Early life ==
Taylor grew up in the Central Queensland coal mining town of Blackwater where he started off his career playing in the Under-7s with the Blackwater Crushers.

Taylor attended St. Brendan's College in Yeppoon and in 2005 represented Australia at schoolboy level. He also played Rugby Union before committing to League.

== Playing career ==
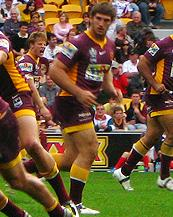
Taylor in action for the Broncos

=== Brisbane Broncos ===
In 2006, Taylor signed with the Brisbane Broncos. Playing 49 times over 3 seasons, he departed the Brisbane side in 2009 to join South Sydney.

=== South Sydney Rabbitohs ===
Taylor was one of the Rabbitohs' strongest players during his two seasons with the club, earning four Queensland State of Origin caps while with the club, as well as selection in the Australian squad at the end of the 2011 season. Taylor was originally selected to play in the 2010 All Stars match but withdrew due to injury. In his first year with Souths, Taylor was selected to play for Queensland and made his debut for the Maroons from the bench in Game I of the 2010 State of Origin series. He played in all 3 games in 2010. Taylor played game 2 and was suspended in time for the third game 2011 and as a result, was unable to play. Taylor made his test debut for Australia in 2012 ANZAC test. He also played for Queensland in the 2012 State of Origin series. Taylor played in the first two origins then dropped for the third game in 2012. At the end of the 2012 season, Taylor was included in the Australian train-on squad.

=== Gold Coast Titans ===
Taylor signed a 4-year contract with the Gold Coast Titans in 2012. It was reported that Taylor signed the contract to be closer to home. Taylor joined the acclaimed forward pack of the Titans, which included Greg Bird, Nate Myles, Ashley Harrison and Luke Bailey, all of which had played in their representative state teams. 2013 was a very up-and-down year for Taylor. Failing to make the Queensland Maroons, as well as Taylor being dropped from the first grade squad, led to many media reports suggesting the Titans made one of the poorer signings for 2013.

Taylor was recalled to Queensland's squad for the second State of Origin match in 2014, replacing the injured Corey Parker. He scored 7 tries from his 19 NRL appearances.

One of five Titans players charged with cocaine possession or supply in 2015, Taylor was initially stood down from the first grade squad, but recalled after pleading innocent. He was left out of the Queensland State of Origin team and was later dropped to the Titans Queensland Cup feeder club mid-season. In October, he was ordered to stand trial over the cocaine charges.

=== Catalans Dragons ===
On 4 August 2015, Taylor signed a 2-year contract with French Super League club Catalans Dragons beginning in 2016. He also announced his ambitions to play for England for which he is eligible through his Cumbrian born grandfather.

=== Canberra Raiders ===
On 18 October 2016, Taylor was offered a train and trial contract with the Canberra Raiders and trained with the team during the 2017 pre-season. Based on his performances, the Raiders coach, Ricky Stuart, offered him a contract for 2017. He was available for selection from round three after serving a 2 match suspension.

In November 2016, Taylor was fined $1000 after he pleaded guilty to cocaine possession charges dating back to August 2016.

Taylor made his 2017 appearance off the bench for the Raiders in their 46–6 win over the Wests Tigers at GIO Stadium in Canberra.

=== Toronto Wolfpack ===
Taylor had signed to play with Kingstone Press Championship side Toronto Wolfpack for the 2018 season but before he could even make his debut it was reported on 18 January 2018 that Taylor, along with teammates Fuifui Moimoi and Ryan Bailey, parted ways with the club by "mutual agreement" following a preseason training camp in Portugal. It was later reported that the players had twice missed curfew during the trip.

=== Central Queensland Capras ===
On 1 February 2018, it was announced that Taylor had been signed by the Rockhampton-based QRL team, the Central Queensland Capras on a two-year deal to play in the Intrust Super Cup competition. The Capras decision to sign Taylor was described by the media as him being handed a lifeline and an opportunity for him to get his playing career back on track. Upon signing with the Capras, Taylor claimed a couple of NRL sides were interested in signing him but he had declined their interest, preferring to return home. However, Taylor said that despite his reluctance to re-enter the NRL, the Capras had indicated that they would be prepared to release him from his contract if an opportunity arose for him to join another NRL club during his time at the Capras.

On 13 August 2018, television personality Erin Molan was slammed by fans and the media for fat shaming Taylor during a segment on the Sunday Footy Show. Molan was forced to apologise to Taylor the following day taking to Twitter to say “(I’m) absolutely appalled by this", she wrote. "Unreservedly apologise on behalf of the show to Dave Taylor. The panel were expecting the vision to show a gun try or a big hit as our gutsy play. There was no malice or intent to offend but that doesn’t matter. We are sorry".

On 20 June 2019, Taylor retired from rugby league, having played 22 games over one and a half seasons for the Capras.
