= Justin Hodges =

Australia international rugby league footballer (born 1982)

Justin "Hodgo" Hodges
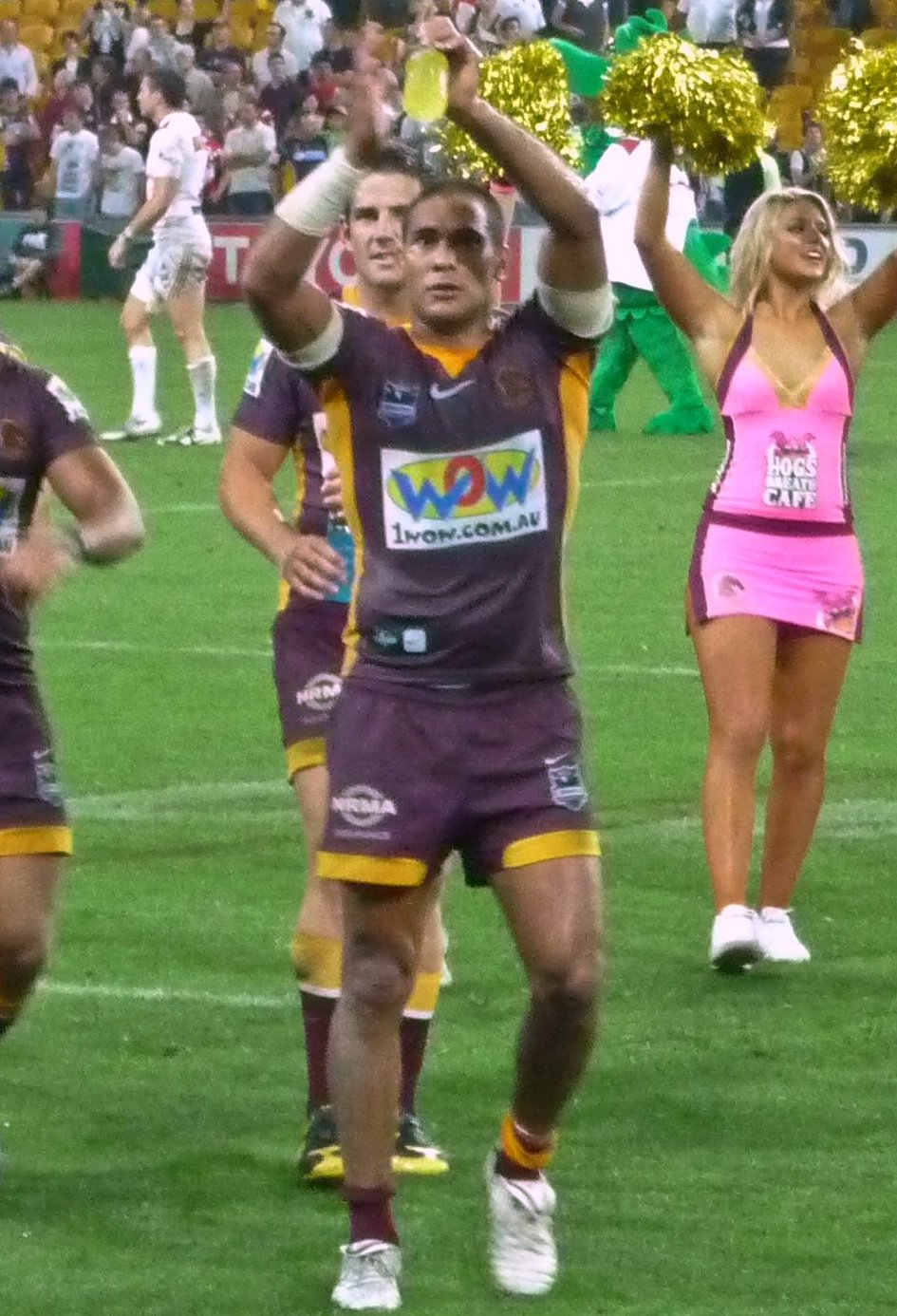

Personal information
- Full name: Justin Hodges
- Born: 25 May 1982 (age 44) Cairns, Queensland, Australia

Playing information
- Height: 188 cm (6 ft 2 in)
- Weight: 94 kg (14 st 11 lb)
- Position: Centre, Fullback
Club
Years	Team	Pld	T	G	FG	P
2000–01	Brisbane Broncos	17	6	0	0	24
2002–04	Sydney Roosters	59	26	0	0	104
2005–15	Brisbane Broncos	178	67	1	0	270
	Total	254	99	1	0	398
Representative
Years	Team	Pld	T	G	FG	P
2002–15	Queensland	24	5	1	0	22
2006–13	Australia	13	4	0	0	16
2012–15	Indigenous All Stars	3	0	0	0	0
- Boxing career
- Weight: Heavyweight
- Relatives: Jayden Hodges (cousin)

Boxing record
- Total fights: 8
- Wins: 5
- Win by KO: 2
- Losses: 3
- Draws: 0

Justin Hodges (born 25 May 1982) is an Australian professional boxer and former professional rugby league footballer who played in the 2000s and 2010s. A Queensland State of Origin and Australian international representative centre, Hodges started his career in the National Rugby League with the Brisbane Broncos before moving to the Sydney Roosters, with whom he won the 2002 NRL Premiership, before returning to the Broncos in 2005, and winning the 2006 NRL Premiership. He also captained the Broncos.

== Early life ==
Hodges was born in Cairns, Queensland on 25 May 1982. He grew up there and played his junior rugby league for Cairns Kangaroos Juniors, as U11 Premiers in 1992, through to undefeated U16's in 1998, before being signed by the Brisbane Broncos.

== Playing career ==
=== 2000 ===
In round 14 of the 2000 NRL season, Hodges made his debut in the National Rugby League for the Brisbane Broncos on the wing against the Canberra Raiders at Canberra Stadium. He played well, saving two tries in a losing 16-14 Broncos team. In round 16 against the Melbourne Storm at Olympic Park, Hodges scored his first NRL career try in the Broncos 16–12 loss. Hodges finished his debut year in the NRL having played in 5 matches and scored 2 tries for the 2000 Brisbane Broncos season.

=== 2001 ===
Hodges was promoted to the full-time NRL team for the 2001 Brisbane Broncos season, however only played in 12 matches and scored 4 tries for the club. The Broncos failed to re-sign Hodges before 30 June anti-tampering date, which was to prevent clubs taking players from other clubs. Hodges then signed a three-year deal with the Sydney Roosters. Feeling betrayed by his defection, Broncos coach Wayne Bennett told Hodges that his services were no longer required and pushed him back to the Broncos' feeder club, the Toowoomba Clydesdales.

=== 2002 ===
Hodges signed with the Sydney Roosters for the 2002 NRL season. In round 1 against the South Sydney Rabbitohs at SFS, Hodges made his club debut for the Sydney Roosters in the 40–6 win. In Round 4 against the Northern Eagles at Brookvale Oval, Hodges scored his first and second club tries for the Roosters in the 28–22 loss. During the 2002 season, Hodges made headlines for all the wrong reasons, which included a disastrous State of Origin debut where he threw two in goal passes which turned into tries for the opposing team even though Queensland won 26-18 He was also punched by Brisbane Broncos player Casey McGuire in the Roosters 16-12 preliminary final win at SFS. On 6 October 2002, Hodges played at centre in the Sydney Roosters 2002 NRL Grand Final 30–8 victory against the New Zealand Warriors. Hodges played in 26 matches and scored 11 tries for the 2002 Sydney Roosters season.

=== 2003 ===
Having won the 2002 NRL Premiership, the Roosters travelled to England to play the 2003 World Club Challenge against Super League champions, St Helens R.F.C. Hodges played at centre in the Roosters 38–0 victory. In Game 1 of the 2003 State of Origin series, Hodges suffered a serious knee injury, damaging the cruciate ligament in his left knee early in the second half of the match in Queensland's 25–12 loss. The game was played at Brisbane's Suncorp Stadium and Hodges considered legal action against the stadium for the poor state of the playing surface. However, he decided not to take legal action against the stadium. Hodges played in 11 matches and scored 8 tries for the Roosters in the 2003 NRL season.

=== 2004 ===
In early 2004, Hodges broke up with his long-time girlfriend and was given two weeks sympathy leave from the Sydney Roosters. Hodges caused further disruption to the Roosters when he missed a training session and club functions to spend time with his friends and family. After Hodges played in Game 1 of the 2004 State of Origin series in the Maroons 9–8 loss at ANZ Stadium, Roosters coach Ricky Stuart put Hodges into the lower grade premier league. Hodges however, made it back into the first grade Roosters team in round 12, scoring a hat-trick against the New Zealand Warriors in the Roosters 58–6 win at ANZ Stadium. In the following week in round 13, Hodges was sent off for a high shot on Canterbury-Bankstown Bulldogs player and Queensland teammate Steve Price in the Roosters 40–12 loss at ANZ Stadium. Hodges was subsequently suspended for 6 weeks. In mid 2004, Hodges went to Brisbane to talk to Broncos coach Wayne Bennett to seek a return to the Broncos. This was approved by Roosters boss Brian Canavan, but Roosters coach Stuart did not know that Hodges wanted a release from the club. After several off-field incidents, Hodges was expected to leave the Roosters mid-season and go to the Broncos, but the Broncos did not want this. On 4 October 2004, Hodges played for the Roosters at centre in their 2004 NRL Grand Final 16–13 loss against cross-Sydney rivals, the Canterbury-Bankstown Bulldogs. Hodges played in 21 matches and scored 7 tries in his last year with the Sydney Roosters.

=== 2005 ===
After the feud between coach Bennett and Hodges earlier in 2001, some critics felt that Hodges would not be able to fit well into the Broncos team. But during an off season camp, Hodges and Bennett sorted things out and all Hodges wanted to do was play rugby league. Hodges stated that he did not regret going to Sydney, but felt it was time to go home back to Brisbane. Former Brisbane Broncos captain Gorden Tallis backed Hodges return to the Broncos, despite some fans questioning the merits in which Hodges returned. Hodges's return caused a problem for the Broncos. They now had three centres, while only two could play in that position. Hodges, Shaun Berrigan and Brent Tate were left to contend for the two centre positions. For the early rounds of 2005, Hodges was forced to play on the wing, with Tate and Berrigan in the centres. Hodges had his Broncos return match in round 1 against the North Queensland Cowboys on the wing in the Broncos 29–16 win at Suncorp Stadium. In round 3 against his former club the Sydney Roosters at SFS, Hodges scored his first try as a Bronco again in the 40–22 win. In Round 7 against the Cronulla-Sutherland Sharks at Remondis Stadium, Brent Tate suffered a shoulder injury allowing Hodges to play in his preferred position of centre in the Broncos' 16–12 win. In Round 24 against the Penrith Panthers, Hodges suffered ligament damage in his right knee during the Broncos 22–20 loss at Penrith Stadium. Hodges later returned for the Broncos in their last match against the Wests Tigers at SFS in the Broncos 34-6 semi-finals loss. The Broncos were knocked out of the finals, after losing seven straight matches. Hodges played in 19 matches and scored 11 tries his return year with the Broncos in the 2005 NRL season.

=== 2006 ===
In 2006, Hodges started the season playing in the centre position and continued to play there for the first 10 rounds of the competition. However injury plagued him over the next 10 rounds, only playing one game for the Broncos in those rounds. Despite this, Hodges was selected to play for Queensland in the first two games of their 2006 State of Origin series win, the first of what would become a record consecutive run. In the second game he intercepted a NSW pass and ran 85 metres to score a try in the 30–6 win at Suncorp Stadium. However, injury sidelined him for over 3 weeks including the 3rd State of Origin match, before he made his return against the North Queensland Cowboys, a game that the Broncos lost 26–10 at 1300SMILES Stadium. The Broncos form continued to slide, until coach Wayne Bennett moved Hodges from the centres to fullback, in place of injured teammate Karmichael Hunt. The team cast off their slump and made it into the 2006 NRL Grand Final, Hodges' third in five seasons. Facing minor premiers Melbourne Storm, Hodges was selected to play at fullback. In the 20th minute, off the back of a skilful Darren Lockyer inside pass, Hodges scored a try and Brisbane went on to win the grand final 15–8. Hodges played in 20 matches, scored 10 tries and kicked a goal for the Broncos in the 2006 NRL season. At the end of 2006, Hodges went on to play for Australia in the 2006 Tri-Nations Series. Hodges making his Australia national debut against New Zealand at centre in the Kangaroos 30–18 win at Mt Smart Stadium. In the Kangaroos 33–10 victory over Great Britain, Hodges scored his international try at Suncorp Stadium. Hodges played at centre in the last match against New Zealand in which Australia won 16–12 in golden point extra time at SFS.

=== 2007 ===
Due to the Broncos winning the grand final, Hodges, along with the rest of the team, travelled to England to play the 2007 World Club Challenge. Hodges played in the centres for the trial match against the Crusaders, which they won 32–6. Hodges scored an intercept try just before halftime, in the trial match. In the World Club Challenge against St Helens RLFC, the Broncos lost the match 18–14. With Karmichael Hunt playing in the halves, Hodges was moved to fullback for the first two rounds of the 2007 season. When Hunt was showing poor form in the halves he was moved back to fullback, and Hodges moved back into the centres for Round 3, in that round against the Penrith Panthers, Hodges equalled the Broncos club record of scoring four tries in a match in the Broncos 29-28 golden point extra time loss at Suncorp Stadium. Hodges was selected for the 2007 ANZAC Test against New Zealand at centre in the Kangaroos 30–6 win at Suncorp Stadium. Hodges played in all three games for Queensland in the 2007 State of Origin series. Hodges scored one try in the third game in the 18–4 loss at Suncorp Stadium even though Queensland won the series 2–1. Despite being sidelined for several weeks due to a knee injury, Hodges finished the season as the Broncos top try-scorer with 12 tries in 19 matches and was Dally M Centre of the Year.

=== 2008 ===
Hodges was selected for Australia in the 2008 ANZAC Test match against New Zealand at centre in the Kangaroos 28–12 win at SCG. Hodges played in Game 1 of the 2008 State of Origin series in the Maroons 18–10 loss at ANZ Stadium. Queensland later won the series 2–1. In August 2008, Hodges was named in the preliminary 46-man Kangaroos squad for the 2008 World Cup. In Round 21 against the Canberra Raiders at Suncorp Stadium, Hodges copped a 2-week suspension for giving referee Tony Archer a "up yours" gesture behind his back after he was penalised for a strip on Raiders winger Colin Best in the Broncos 34–6 win. In round 26 against the Newcastle Knights, Hodges showed his true toughness in the Broncos 24–2 win at Suncorp Stadium by taking to the field with severe eye infection and an undisclosed illness. Hodges finished the 2008 NRL season with him playing in 14 matches and scoring 7 tries for the Broncos. On 7 October 2008, Hodges was selected in the final 24-man Australia squad. On 14 October 2008, Hodges was ruled out of the World Cup after finding he needed shoulder surgery, facing up to six months recovery.

=== 2009 ===
Hodges was selected for Australia in the 2009 ANZAC Test match against New Zealand at centre, scoring 2 tries in the Kangaroos 38–10 win at Suncorp Stadium. In April 2009, he was named in the preliminary 25-man squad to play for Queensland in the opening game of the 2009 State of Origin series, and was subsequently picked at centre for the opening State of Origin match. Hodges injured his leg during the first half, and whilst on the sideline for the remainder of the match, New South Wales scored all their tries in the 28–18 win at Etihad Stadium which Phil Gould later referred to as "no coincidence". In Game 3 in the Maroons 28–16 loss at Suncorp Stadium, Hodges was heavily involved in an altercation with several other QLD and NSW players only 2 minutes before full-time. TV broadcasts clearly showed Hodges 'egging' NSW players on to fight, following an incident between Steve Price and Brett White (and later Trent Waterhouse and Justin Poore). Hodges later told reporters that he believed what Justin Poore did (lifting an unconscious Price up off the ground) to be a "dog act". Hodges also scored a try in the match. Hodges finished the 2009 NRL season with him playing 18 matches and scoring 3 tries for the Broncos. In October 2009, Hodges travelled to England as part of Australia's squad for the 2009 Four Nations tournament, playing in 3 matches including playing at centre in the Kangaroos 46–16 win in the Four Nations Final against England at Elland Road.

=== 2010 ===
Hodges ruptured his Achilles tendon during pre-season training, and subsequently missed the entire 2010 NRL season. Hodges also missed being part of Queensland's victorious Origin campaign in which it won for the fifth year in succession.

=== 2011 ===
Hodges was expected to return within the first few rounds of the 2011 season after playing successfully in two pre-season trials. In Round 3, Hodges made his return in a 'local derby' match against the Gold Coast Titans at Robina Stadium where he scored the match-winning try in the Broncos 14–8 win. Hodges form in the early part of the season rewarded him with selection at centre in the 2011 ANZAC Test in the Kangaroos 20–10 win at Robina Stadium. On 11 May 2011, Hodges extended his contract with the Broncos to the end of the 2014 season. Injury was still affecting Hodges, as he was ruled out for several more games. Hodges missed the first two games of the 2011 State of Origin series, however made his return in the third game sending his club, state and national captain, Darren Lockyer out on an Origin high as the Maroons won 34–24 at Suncorp Stadium. In Round 21 against the Cronulla-Sutherland Sharks, Hodges scored a hat-trick, two tries of which were set up by Darren Lockyer in the Broncos 46–16 win at Suncorp Stadium. Hodges finished the 2011 NRL season with him playing 17 matches and scoring 8 tries for the Broncos.

=== 2012 ===
Hodges was selected for the Indigenous All Stars against the NRL All Stars at Robina Stadium at centre in the 36–28 loss. In the 2012 ANZAC Test against New Zealand, Hodges was selected to play at centre in the Kangaroos 20–12 win at Eden Park. In the 2012 State of Origin series, Hodges played at centre in all three matches for Queensland, scoring a try in the third and deciding game in the Maroons 21–20 win at Suncorp Stadium, resulting Queensland winning the 2012 Series 2–1. Following the 2012 Season and the signing of Scott Prince, Hodges revealed that he wanted to shift from Centre to the Fullback role for the Broncos club (for the 2013 Season); after being inspired by a breakout season from his Queensland Maroons and Australian Kangaroos Test team-mate Greg Inglis (who made a switch from Centre to Fullback in the 2012 Season). Hodges finished the 2012 NRL season with him playing in 18 matches and scoring 5 tries for the Broncos.

=== 2013 ===
Hodges spent most of the 2013 Season playing in the centres but spent some time playing a bit of Fullback for the club as well. Hodges was selected to play in the 2013 ANZAC Test for Australia at centre, scoring a try in the second half in the Kangaroos 32–12 victory against New Zealand at Canberra Stadium. Hodges featured in the Queensland's successful 2013 State of Origin series, in Game 2, Hodges was sin-binned for fighting in the Maroons 26–6 win at Suncorp Stadium. In the third and deciding game, Hodges scored a try in the Maroons 12–10 win, also in the match made a funny remark on loud audio to referee Shayne Hayne saying to him "I’ll buy you a beer" to allow a disallowed Matt Scott try when origin streaker Wati Holmwood interrupted play by running an almost 100 metres naked. In August, following Broncos team-mate Corey Norman's axing from the Broncos line-up (of the final games of the 2013 season) Hodges and Josh Hoffman took turns playing Fullback and in the Centres, rotating/interchanging between these 2 positions. However, Hodges season ended prematurely after a snapped left Achilles which he suffered in the Round 22 home clash against the St George Illawarra Dragons in the Broncos 26–24 win at Suncorp Stadium. Hodges finished the 2013 NRL season with him playing in 14 matches and scoring 6 tries for the Broncos. During the NRL post-season, in October Hodges mentioned that team-mate and Kiwi-international Test player Josh Hoffman was not the right player to play fullback for the Broncos and backed Ben Barba in the Fullback role for the club.

=== 2014 ===
In January 2014 Hodges, along with Corey Parker was named as co-captain for the 2014 Brisbane Broncos season, succeeding from Sam Thaiday. Hodges missed the first few weeks of the season, due to the injury he suffered in the 2013 season. During his stint watching the Broncos play from the sidelines, Hodges mentioned that club team-mate and Kiwi-Test player Josh Hoffman was playing his best footy at Five-eighth and that he was very impressed with the way Hoffman was playing in the Broncos No. 6 Jersey. On 22 April 2014, Hodges signed a new 2-year deal extension with the Broncos keeping him at the club until at the end of the 2016 season. Hodges was expected to return from his injury, in Round 6 of the season, however he made his comeback early, playing in the Broncos Round 5 home game against the Parramatta Eels off the interchange bench in the Broncos 25–18 loss at Suncorp Stadium. Hodges played at centre in all 3 matches of the 2014 State of Origin series. In Round 24 against the Newcastle Knights at Suncorp Stadium, Hodges played in the fullback position for the injured Josh Hoffman in the Broncos rampaging 48–6 win (Lachlan Maranta was originally named at fullback but switched to the wing and Dale Copley making a moved to the centres), that was the first time that Hodges played at fullback since Round 26 in the 2007 NRL season in the Broncos 68–22 loss to the Parramatta Eels at Parramatta Stadium. Hodges finished off the 2014 NRL season with him playing in 17 matches and scoring 2 tries for the Broncos. On 15 September 2014, Hodges was selected for the Australia Kangaroos 2014 Four Nations train-on squad but later withdrew from injury.

=== 2015 ===
On 13 February 2015, Hodges was selected at centre for the Indigenous All Stars in the 2015 Harvey Norman Rugby League All Stars match at Robina Stadium. The Indigenous side won 20–6 over the NRL All Stars. On 27 February 2015, Hodges was named as the solo captain of the Broncos for the 2015 season by coach Wayne Bennett. On 25 April 2015, Hodges announced that he would retire from representative duties at the conclusion of the year in order to focus solely on playing for the Broncos. In what was his final State of Origin series, Hodges featured for Queensland in all three matches of the 2015 State of Origin series. In Game Three of the series, in what was his final State of Origin match for Queensland, Hodges scored the final points of the match, converting Aidan Guerra's 78th minute try in an eventual 52–6 win in front of a record crowd of 52,500 at Suncorp Stadium. On 10 August 2015, Hodges announced that he would retire from Rugby League at the end of the season. In the Broncos Preliminary Finals match against the Sydney Roosters, Hodges played his 250th NRL match and also was placed on report for a lifting tackle on Aidan Guerra in the Broncos 31–12 win at Suncorp Stadium. Hodges had a nervous wait in the lead up to the Broncos Grand Final against Queensland rivals the North Queensland Cowboys while waiting for a decision at the NRL Judiciary to see if he can complete his fairytale swansong with a possible Grand Final win. Dale Copley was named as 18th man as cover for Hodges but on 29 September 2015, Hodges was cleared to play in the Grand Final after being found not guilty of a grade one dangerous throw. On 4 October 2015, in the Broncos Queensland derby 2015 NRL Grand Final against the North Queensland Cowboys, Hodges played his last match of his NRL career match at centre and captained the Broncos in the historic golden point 17–16 loss. Hodges and Cowboys captain Johnathan Thurston were noted as the first two Indigenous players to captain a grand final team. Hodges finished his last season in the NRL with him playing in 20 matches and scoring 3 tries for the Brisbane Broncos in the 2015 NRL season.

== Statistics ==
Year	Team	Games	Tries	Goals	Pts
2000	Brisbane Broncos	5	2		8
2001	Brisbane Broncos	12	4		16
2002	Sydney Roosters	26	11		44
2003	Sydney Roosters	11	8		32
2004	Sydney Roosters	21	7		28
2005	Brisbane Broncos	19	11		44
2006	Brisbane Broncos	20	10	1	42
2007	Brisbane Broncos	19	12		48
2008	Brisbane Broncos	14	7		28
2009	Brisbane Broncos	18	3		12
2011	Brisbane Broncos	17	8		32
2012	Brisbane Broncos	18	5		20
2013	Brisbane Broncos	14	6		24
2014	Brisbane Broncos	17	2		8
2015	Brisbane Broncos	20	3		12
	Totals	251	99	1	398

== Boxing career ==
On 9 February 2019, Hodges made his boxing debut against former furniture removalist Rob Baron who was also making his boxing debut. Hodges won the fight after just 75 seconds knocking out Baron.

In his second fight, Hodges faced New Zealand boxer Troy McMahon. Hodges won the fight in 23 seconds, knocking out McMahon. Hodges came under media and fan backlash after the fight due to Hodges choice of opponent. Hodges responded to the criticism saying "I don't care about the crowd, the crowd doesn't bother me. I've spent 18 years playing the game of rugby league, They are the one booing, but they should get in the ring and have a go themselves".

In his third fight, Hodges opponent was rugby league player Darcy Lussick who was making his boxing debut. Hodges was knocked out by Lussick within the first 39 seconds of the fight.

Debut
Brisbane Broncos
First Grade Debut – 8 May 2000
Sydney Roosters
First Grade Debut – 15 March 2002
Queensland Maroons
Queensland State of Origin Debut – 5 June 2002
Australian Kangaroos
Australian Test Debut – 14 October 2006

Sporting positions
Preceded by Sam Thaiday	Captain; Brisbane Broncos; 2014 - 2015	Succeeded by Darius Boyd
Awards
Preceded by Mark Gasnier	Dally M Centre of the Year; 2007	Succeeded by Josh Morris
Preceded by Shaun Berrigan	Broncos Best Back; 2005	Succeeded by Darren Lockyer
Preceded by Karmichael Hunt	Broncos Best Back; 2009	Succeeded by Israel Folau
Preceded by Darren Lockyer	Broncos Best Back; 2012	Succeeded by Josh Hoffman
Preceded by Award Introduced	Broncos Most Consistent; 2006	Succeeded by Corey Parker
Records
Broncos Most Tries in a Match with Steve Renouf, Wendell Sailor, Karmichael Hunt, Denan Kemp and Israel Folau
