= Josh Hoffman =

New Zealand international rugby league footballer

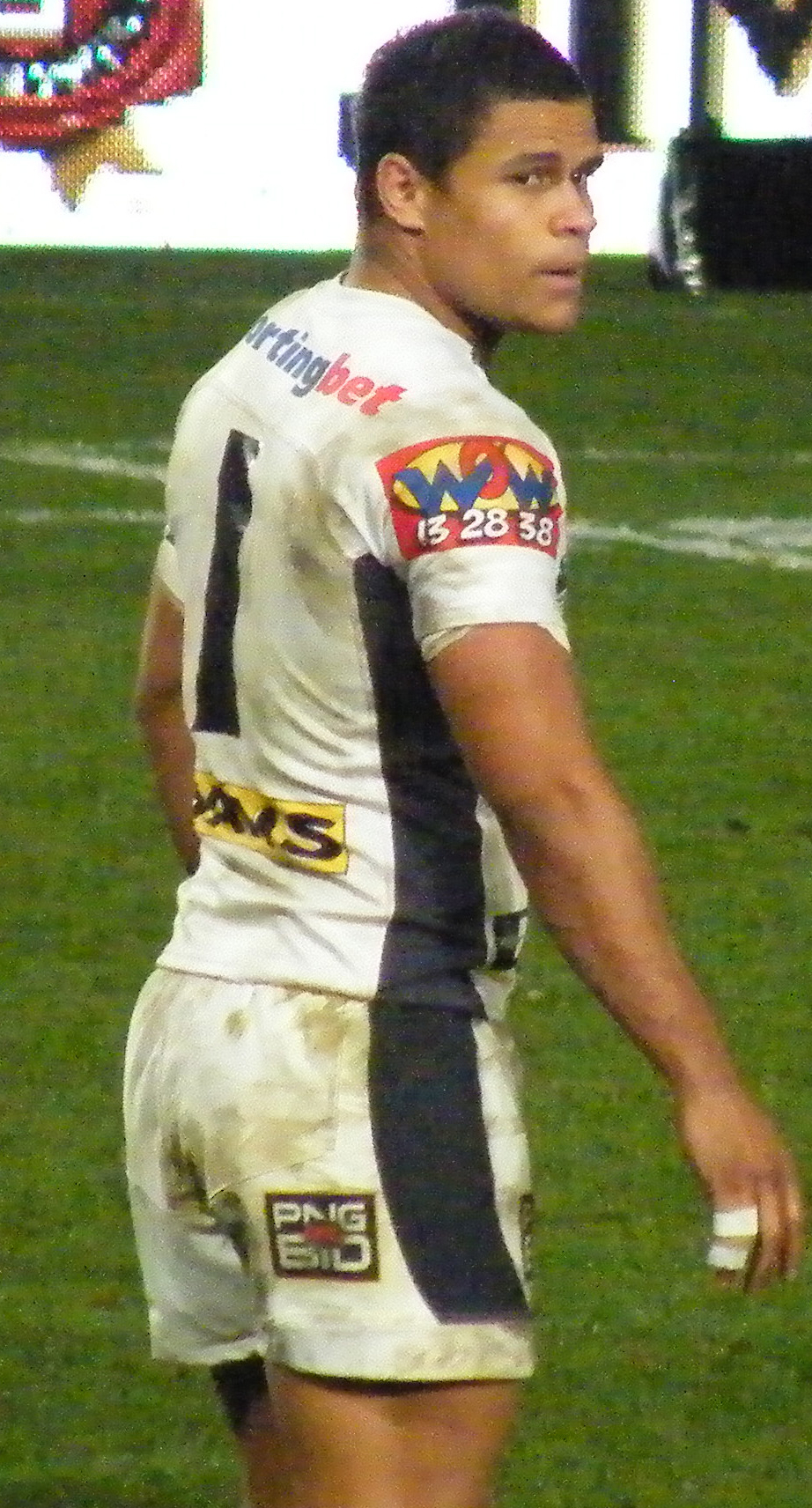

Personal information
- Full name: Joshua Hoffman
- Born: 10 March 1988 (age 38) Mackay, Queensland, Australia
- Height: 183 cm (6 ft 0 in)
- Weight: 93 kg (14 st 9 lb)

Playing information
- Position: Fullback, Wing, Centre, Five-eighth
Club
Years	Team	Pld	T	G	FG	P
2008–14	Brisbane Broncos	109	33	0	0	132
2015–16	Gold Coast Titans	49	14	0	0	56
2017–19	Parramatta Eels	31	15	0	0	60
	Total	189	62	0	0	248
Representative
Years	Team	Pld	T	G	FG	P
2009	Queensland Residents	1	1	0	0	4
2012–13	New Zealand	5	2	0	0	8
2015	Indigenous All Stars	1	0	0	0	0
- Source: As of 5 January 2024
- Spouse: Emma Kerr
- Relatives: Ben Barba (cousin); Wendell Sailor (cousin); Tristan Sailor (cousin); Dane Gagai (cousin); Jacob Gagai (cousin); Travis Waddell (cousin)

Josh Hoffman (born 10 March 1988) is a New Zealand international rugby league footballer who plays as fullback, winger and centre, five-eighth for the Wests Panthers in the Brisbane Rugby League premiership.

He previously played for the Brisbane Broncos, Gold Coast Titans and Parramatta Eels in the National Rugby League, and the Indigenous All Stars.

== Background ==
Hoffman was born in Mackay, Queensland, Australia to a New Zealand Māori father Shane and mother Grace who is of Torres Strait Islands descent. Hoffman attended Mackay State High School. During his childhood junior footy playing days in Mackay, he played alongside Ben Barba as well as for Mackay. Hoffman also played a rugby union, playing at Inside Centre.

He is related to former Brisbane Broncos player Wendell Sailor, St Helens R.F.C. player Ben Barba, South Sydney Rabbitohs player Dane Gagai and Travis Waddell. Hoffman is of Ngāti Pikiāo descent. Hoffman has two daughters, Leilani-Grace (who was born in 2013) and Evie (who was born in 2015) with long-term partner Emma Kerr, whom he married on 10 December 2011 at Coral Sea Resort in Airlie Beach. He and his wife honeymooned in Hawaii before he returned to Broncos training for the 2012 season.

== Playing career ==
=== 2008 ===
In round 13 of the 2008 NRL season, Hoffman made his NRL debut against the St George Illawarra Dragons, filling in for Karmichael Hunt while he was on Origin duty. Hoffman played in 2 matches for the Broncos in his debut year, spending most of the year in the under 20's Toyota Cup competition.

=== 2009 ===
Hoffman returned to Broncos squad in round 17 following off season shoulder surgery, playing against the New Zealand Warriors. He scored his first NRL try in the Broncos 28–14 win at Suncorp Stadium. Hoffman played in 3 more matches for the Broncos. Hoffman spent the rest of the year playing for the Redcliffe Dolphins in the Queensland Cup and was also the player of the match for Queensland Residents in their win over the New South Wales Residents.

=== 2010 ===
After the departure of Karmichael Hunt from the club at the end of the 2009 season, the youngster was tipped to take over the fullback position. He did so, taking over the fullback role for the Broncos in the 2010 season and was awarded the Paul Morgan Medal as the Broncos' best and fairest player of the season. Hoffman played in 20 matches and scored 7 tries for the Broncos in the 2010 NRL season. Despite being raised in Queensland, as well as growing-up and playing his junior rugby league football in Mackay, Hoffman chose New Zealand over playing for Queensland and Australia, saying "I enjoyed watching Origin, watching the old greats when I was a kid but growing up I never rarely dreamt about playing Origin, I always wanted to play for New Zealand." Before he played a test for New Zealand, New Zealand rugby league football manager Tony Kemp believed Hoffman "could potentially head into the next World Cup in 2013 as a mainstay in the Kiwis team."

=== 2011 ===
Hoffman featured in 16 matches and scored 6 tries for the Broncos in the 2011 NRL season. Hoffman picked up a leg injury in the round 3 clash against the Gold Coast Titans, in the Broncos 14–8 win at Cbus Super Stadium, and that sidelined him until round 13. Hoffman featured in every Broncos game after coming back from a leg injury from round 13 through to round 26. However, he injured his leg in the round 26 clash against the Manly-Warringah Sea Eagles in the first half and that ended his season. The injury also meant he was unavailable for the New Zealand national rugby league team for their trans-Tasman test match and 2011 Four Nations tournament squad. On 26 October 2011, Hoffman extended his contract through to 2015. After his contract resigning, he said that he was keen on shifting from fullback to five-eighth for the 2012 season, replacing retiring club captain Darren Lockyer in the number six jumper.

=== 2012 ===
On 20 April 2012, Hoffman made his international debut for the New Zealand national rugby league team, playing at fullback in the Kiwis 20–12 loss to Australia in the 2012 Anzac Test at Eden Park. Despite the loss, Hoffman produced a strong performance; making a couple of strong runs/metres with the ball and also making a try-saving tackle on Brisbane Broncos club teammate and Australian Kangaroos centre, Justin Hodges. During the week before round 23 against the Canterbury-Bankstown Bulldogs, Hoffman was axed to the Redcliffe Dolphins in the Queensland Cup after he was late for training. Hoffman returned in the next week for the Broncos in round 24 against the Melbourne Storm, playing on the wing in the Broncos 19–18 loss at Suncorp Stadium. Hoffman played in 23 matches and scored 3 tries for the Broncos in the 2012 NRL season. Following the 2012 season, Hoffman was selected to play fullback for New Zealand in the post-season trans-Tasman test against Australia at 1300SMILES Stadium. Australia won the game 18–10. Despite the loss, Hoffman was one of the best players on the field, producing a try-saving tackle on Johnathan Thurston, making a couple of great touches with the ball and producing a number of good runs with the ball.

=== 2013 ===
Due to the shock arrival of Scott Prince from the Gold Coast Titans, Hoffman was shifted to the wing so that Corey Norman could play at fullback. Hoffman had a flying start on the wing, scoring 7 tries in his first 6 matches, including a hat-trick in round 3, in the Broncos 32–26 loss against the Melbourne Storm. For the 2013 Anzac Test, Hoffman was selected to play for New Zealand at fullback, scoring a try right on half-time in the Kiwis 32–12 loss against Australia at Canberra Stadium. Hoffman played on the wing until round 20, when Corey Norman was dropped to the Queensland Cup and Hoffman was returned to his preferred position of fullback. Hoffman finished the 2013 NRL season as the Broncos highest tryscorer with 15 tries in 24 matches. Following the 2013 season, Hoffman was named in the New Zealand Kiwis Rugby League World Cup squad. On 20 October, Hoffman played at fullback in the Kiwis' 50-0 World Cup warm-up game over the Cook Islands. Two days before the Kiwis' first regular World Cup pool game clash against Samoa, Hoffman dropped the bombshell on the Broncos by asking for an early release from his current Broncos contract (which expired in 2015) to join the Canterbury-Bankstown Bulldogs, following Justin Hodges comments stating that Hoffman was 'not' the right player to play fullback for the Broncos. Hoffman played fullback in the Kiwis' first regular World Cup game, scoring a try in the Kiwis' 42–24 win against Samoa. The following week, coach Stephen Kearney rested him in the Kiwis' 48–0 win over France. However, the week after that Hoffman featured in the Kiwis' 56–10 win over PNG. However, Hoffman was ruled out of the Kiwis' quarter final clash against Scotland due to a shoulder injury. Despite recovering from a shoulder injury and being cleared to play, Hoffman did not play again in the World Cup finals.

=== 2014 ===
Hoffman ended pre-season speculation around his future at the Brisbane Broncos by saying that he was staying with the club and was happy to play anywhere in the Broncos' backline. In February 2014, Hoffman was selected in the Broncos inaugural 2014 Auckland Nines squad, where the team finished runners-up. Hoffman started the season, playing at five-eighth for the Broncos. This was Hoffman's first stint playing at Five-Eighth since his Mackay junior playing days as a 17-year-old kid. In the lead-up to the Broncos ANZAC Day home-game match against the South Sydney Rabbitohs, Hoffman suffered a leg injury in the final Broncos training session, which ruled him out of that NRL ANZAC Day clash and the Anzac Test. However, Hoffman return from injury in round 9 against the North Queensland Cowboys in the Broncos 27–14 loss at 1300SMILES Stadium. Hoffman featured at five-eighth until round 18. In round 19, Hoffman shifted back to fullback, while Broncos teammate Ben Barba shifted to five-eighth for the clash against the New Zealand Warriors. During the game, Hoffman helped the Broncos to a 28–22 win at Suncorp Stadium by producing a performance that included; saving 4 tries and making 98 metres and 6 tackle-bursts from 10 runs. Hoffman went on to play fullback for the Broncos regular season games until round 23, against the South Sydney Rabbitohs, where Hoffman picked up a leg injury in the second half of the Broncos 42–16 loss at ANZ Stadium which ruled him out for the rest of the season. Hoffman finished the Brisbane Broncos 2014 NRL season with him playing in 20 matches and scoring a try. On 6 October, Hoffman was dropped from the New Zealand Kiwis' initial Four Nations squad. However, following a season-ending injury to Panthers rookie winger Dallin Watene-Zelezniak leading up to the Kiwi's first Four Nations game against Australia in Brisbane, Hoffman was called into the squad. On 30 October 2014, after months of speculation, Hoffman signed a 3-year deal with the Gold Coast Titans.

=== 2015 ===
On 20 January 2015, Hoffman was named in the Gold Coast Titans 2015 NRL Auckland Nines squad. On 13 February 2015, Hoffman was selected on the wing for the Indigenous All Stars in the 2015 All Stars match at Cbus Super Stadium. The Indigenous side won 20–6 over the NRL All Stars. In round 1 of the 2015 NRL season, Hoffman made his club debut for the Titans against the Wests Tigers. He played at centre in the Titans 19–18 loss at Cbus Super Stadium. In round 7, against the Penrith Panthers, Hoffman scored his first and second club tries for the Titans in their 32–6 win at Cbus Super Stadium. Hoffman finished his first year with the Titans with him playing in all of their 24 matches and scoring 6 tries.

=== 2016 ===
On 20 June 2016, Hoffman was told by the Titans that his services weren't needed after season's end and was not going to be offered another contract from the club, however he did attract interest from the St George Illawarra Dragons, the Newcastle Knights and St. Helens in the Super League but was reluctant to leave the club. Hoffman finished the 2016 NRL season with him playing in all of the Titans 25 matches and scoring 8 tries. On 21 September 2016, Hoffman was released from his contract with the Titans, where he signed a 3-year deal with the Parramatta Eels starting from the 2017.

=== 2017 ===
In February 2017, Hoffman was named in the Eels 2017 NRL Auckland Nines squad. In Round 1 of the 2017 NRL season, Hoffman made his club debut for the Parramatta Eels against the Manly-Warringah Sea Eagles, where he played on the wing in the 20–12 win at Brookvale Oval. In Round 6 against the New Zealand Warriors, Hoffman scored his first club try for the Eels in the 22–10 loss at Mt Smart Stadium. In their 32–24 win over The Auckland Warriors, Hoffman injured his knee and missed most of the season and struggled to regain his place in The Parramatta side ending up playing the remainder of the year with The Wentworthville Magpies.

=== 2018 ===
Hoffman started off the 2018 season for Parramatta as one of the first choice wingers in the opening five rounds of the competition but was dropped to reserve grade following Parramatta's defeat by Penrith. After spending nearly two months in reserve grade, Hoffman was recalled to The Parramatta squad to face his old club The Brisbane Broncos in Round 12 but was left out of the side at the last minute by coach Brad Arthur. On 2 June, Hoffman returned to the starting side in the club's humiliating 30–4 loss to Newcastle scoring a try right at the end of the game. On 6 August, Hoffman was ruled out for the rest of the season with a shoulder injury.

=== 2019 ===
At the start of the 2019 season, Hoffman was left out of the Parramatta side as coach Brad Arthur opted to go with Blake Ferguson and Maika Sivo as the starting wingers. In Round 2 2019, Hoffman was called into the Parramatta side to cover the suspended Michael Jennings as Parramatta defeated arch rivals Canterbury-Bankstown 36–16. In Round 6, Hoffman was again called up to the first grade side to cover the injured Blake Ferguson as Parramatta defeated Wests Tigers 51–6 in the opening game at the new Western Sydney Stadium.

In Round 10 against North Queensland, Hoffman scored a length of the field intercept try as Parramatta lost a close game 17–10. In Round 12, Hoffman scored the winning try for Parramatta as the club defeated a depleted South Sydney team 26–14 at the Western Sydney Stadium.

In Round 14, Hoffman scored 2 tries as Parramatta defeated his former club Brisbane 38–10 at Western Sydney Stadium. Hoffman was later taken from the field on a stretcher after he suffered an accidental blow to the head by teammate Mitchell Moses.

For much of the 2019 NRL season, Hoffman played for Parramatta's feeder club the Wentworthville Magpies in the Canterbury Cup NSW. Hoffman captained Wentworthville in the club's 2019 Canterbury Cup NSW grand final defeat against Newtown at the Western Sydney Stadium. Wentworthville had made the grand final after finishing in 8th place and produced three upset victories to reach the decider.

=== 2020-2022 ===
After being released by Parramatta, Hoffman joined the Townsville Blackhawks in the Queensland Cup. Hoffman played 13 games for Townsville between 2020 and 2021. In 2022, Hoffman joined Wests Panthers in the local A-grade Brisbane premiership.

=== Statistics ===
==== Brisbane Broncos ====
Season	Matches	Tries	Goals	F/G	Points
2008	2		-	-	-
2009	4	1	-	-	4
2010	20	7	-	-	28
2011	16	6	-	-	24
2012	23	3	-	-	12
2013	24	15	-	-	60
2014	20	1	-	-	4
Total	109	33	-	-	132

==== Gold Coast Titans ====
Year	Matches	Tries	Goals	F/G	Points
2015	24	6	-	-	24
Total	24	6	-	-	24
2016	24	7	-	-	28

==== New Zealand ====
Season	Matches	Tries	Goals	F/G	Points
2012	2	-	-	-	-
2013	3	2	-	-	8
2014	-	-	-	-	-
2015	-	-	-	-	-
Total	5	2	-	-	8
