= 2013 Anzac Test =

Australia	New Zealand
32	12
	1	2	Total
AUS	6	26	32
NZL	6	6	12
- Date: 19 April 2013
- Stadium: GIO Stadium
- Location: Canberra, Australian Capital Territory, Australia
- Man of the Match: Cameron Smith
- Referee: Ashley Klein (Australia)
- Attendance: 25,628

Broadcast partners
- Broadcasters: Nine Network
- Commentators: Ray Warren; Peter Sterling; Phil Gould; Andrew Johns

The 2013 ANZAC test (also known as the VB Test due to sponsorship by Victoria Bitter) was the 14th annual Anzac test, and was not only the first time the Australian Kangaroos played at Canberra Stadium, but it the first time they had ever played in Australia's capital city of Canberra. Australia defeated New Zealand 32-12 in the Test match which was played on 19 April 2013 before a crowd of 25,628.

== Squads ==
Australia	Position	New Zealand
Billy Slater	Fullback	Josh Hoffman
Darius Boyd	Wing	Sam Perrett
Greg Inglis	Centre	Shaun Kenny-Dowall
Justin Hodges	Centre	Dean Whare
Brett Morris	Wing	Jason Nightingale
Johnathan Thurston	Five-Eighth	Kieran Foran(c)
Cooper Cronk	Halfback	Shaun Johnson
Matthew Scott	Prop	Jesse Bromwich
Cameron Smith (c)	Hooker	Isaac Luke
James Tamou	Prop	Jared Wearea-Hargreaves
Greg Bird	2nd Row	Frank Pritchard
Sam Thaiday	2nd Row	Kevin Proctor
Paul Gallen	Lock	Alex Glenn
Kurt Gidley	Interchange	Elijah Taylor
Nate Myles	Interchange	Sam McKendry
Luke Lewis	Interchange	Ben Matulino
Anthony Watmough	Interchange	Tohu Harris
Tim Sheens	Coach	Stephen Kearney

- Roger Tuivasa-Sheck was selected as New Zealand's 18th man.

== Match Summary ==
19 April 2013

Australia	32–12	New Zealand
Tries: Cooper Cronk (5'); Greg Inglis (50'); Brett Morris (53'); Luke Lewis (58'); Darius Boyd (61'); Justin Hodges (72'); Goals: Cameron Smith (5/5 – 5', 50', 53', 58', 61', 72')		Tries: Josh Hoffman (40'); Frank Pritchard (77'); Goals: Shaun Johnson (2/2 – 40', 77')

GIO Stadium, Canberra
Attendance: 25,628
Referee: Ashley Klein (Australia)
Player of the Match: Cameron Smith
