= Wendell Sailor =

Australia international rugby footballer

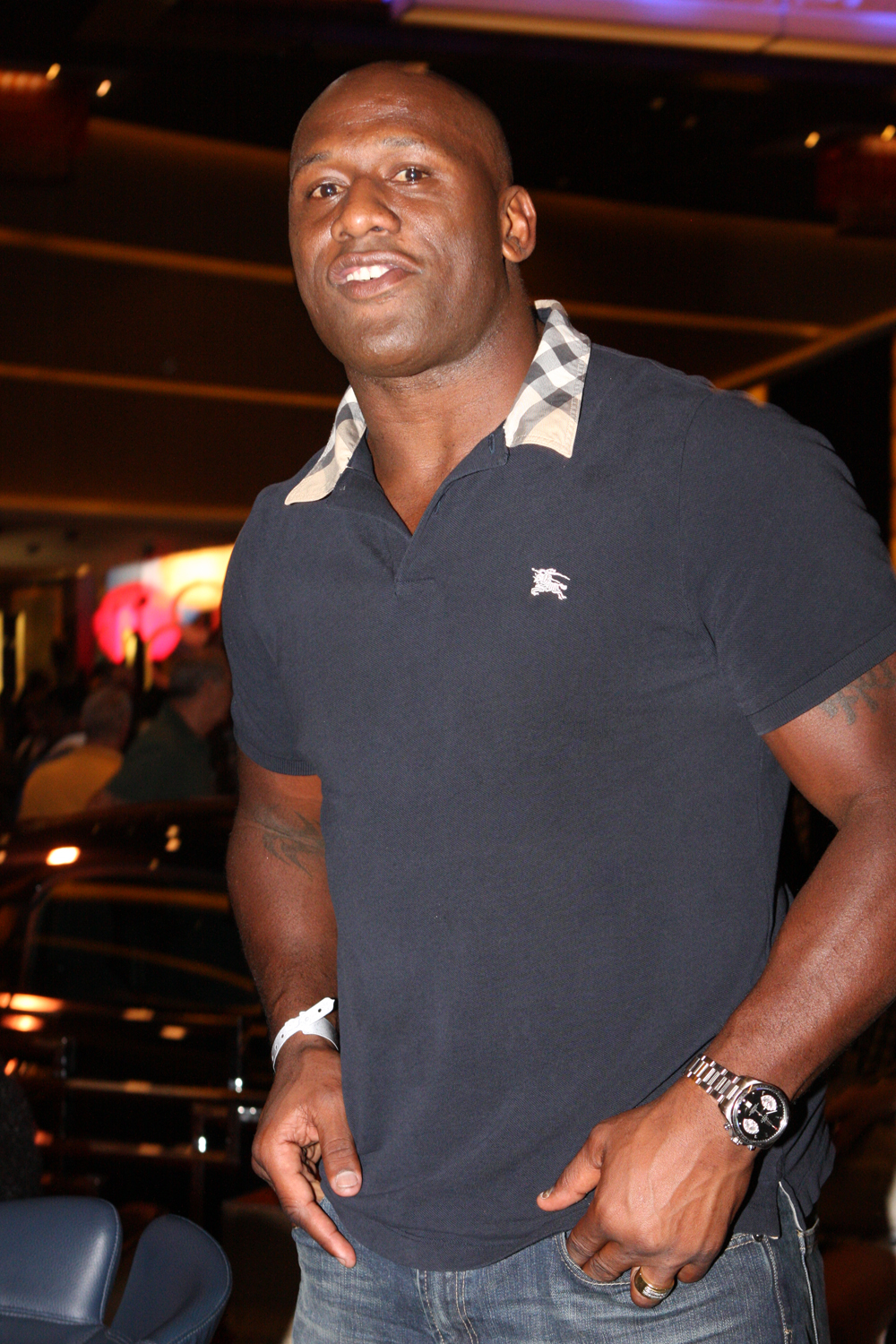

Personal information
- Full name: Wendell Jermaine Sailor
- Born: 16 July 1974 (age 52) Sarina, Queensland, Australia

Playing information
- Height: 191 cm (6 ft 3 in)
- Weight: 106 kg (234 lb; 16 st 10 lb)

Rugby league
- Position: Wing
Club
Years	Team	Pld	T	G	FG	P
1993–01	Brisbane Broncos	189	110	1	0	442
2008–09	St. George Illawarra	33	17	0	0	68
	Total	222	127	1	0	510
Representative
Years	Team	Pld	T	G	FG	P
1994–01	Australia	16	17	0	0	28
1996–01	Queensland	14	1	0	0	4
1997	Queensland (SL)	3	1	0	0	4
1997	Australia (SL)	5	4	0	0	16
2010	Indigenous All Stars	1	1	0	0	4

Rugby union
- Position: Wing
Club
Years	Team	Pld	T	G	FG	P
1998–99	Leeds Tykes	13	15	0	0	75
2002–05	Queensland Reds	47	12	0	0	60
2006	NSW Waratahs	8	4	0	0	20
	Total	68	31	0	0	155
Representative
Years	Team	Pld	T	G	FG	P
2002–05	Australia	37	13	0	0	65
- Relatives: Tristan Sailor (son); Dane Gagai (cousin); Jacob Gagai (cousin); Josh Hoffman (cousin); Travis Waddell (cousin)

Wendell Jermaine Sailor (born 16 July 1974) is an Australian former professional rugby footballer who represented his country in both rugby league and rugby union – a dual code international.

In rugby league Sailor was a member of the successful Brisbane Broncos team of the 1990s, with whom he won Premierships in 1993, 1997, 1998 and 2000. A wing, his large frame and powerful running made him a formidable opponent and prolific try-scorer. He represented Queensland in State of Origin and played for Australia (the Kangaroos) 16 times, including winning the 2000 Rugby League World Cup, where he was the top try-scorer and player of the tournament. He also played 3 times for the Super League Australia side.

In 2001, he moved to the Queensland Reds in rugby union, and later to the New South Wales Waratahs from 2006. He made his debut for Australia (the Wallabies) in 2003 and won 37 caps, including at the 2003 Rugby World Cup, where Australia lost in the final. In 2006 he failed a drugs test and received a two-year suspension from all forms of rugby. His contract with the ARU was terminated, ending his rugby union career.

He returned to rugby league in May 2008 with NRL club the St George Illawarra Dragons after his ban expired, playing for two seasons before retiring.

Since retiring, Sailor has worked in television presenting and has appeared in reality TV shows.

== Background ==
Sailor was born in Brisbane, Queensland, Australia. He is South Sea Islander (specifically Solomon Islander Australian) and West Indian descent. Sailor's son Tristan used to play in the NRL, he now plays for St Helens RLFC in the Super League.

== Early life ==
Sailor grew up with his adoptive parents in Sarina, Queensland. He never knew his father and knew nothing of him apart from his West Indian heritage. His adoptive father is Torres Strait Islander.

== Playing career ==
=== 1993–2001: Rugby league ===
In his inaugural year for the Brisbane Broncos, Sailor played in a handful of games, scoring three tries in his first season, though Sailor had limited involvement that year, the club won the premiership, defeating the St. George Dragons 14–6. After his impressive debut season, he won the Rookie of the Year award at the Broncos club.

The following season Sailor took part in more games, scoring 14 tries. Such a rapid improvement over the course of two seasons saw Sailor become a regular in the Broncos ranks. He quickly became a home crowd favourite in Brisbane because of his speed and power and would soon become a household name in the rugby league world. During the 1994 NSWRL season, Sailor played on the wing for the defending premiers Brisbane when they hosted British champions Wigan for the 1994 World Club Challenge. At the end of the 1994 season he was selected for the 1994 Kangaroo Tour of Europe. He played in the opening fixture against a Cumbrian side where he scored two tries. He then started off the bench in a warm up match against Leeds, before earning a starting wing spot in the next match against Wigan and then playing off the bench again against Castleford. Sailor was again promoted to a starting wing position for the match against Halifax, scoring two tries. He then earned his first Test cap against Great Britain, as a starting wing in their loss at Wembley Stadium in late October.

At the outbreak of the Super League war in 1995, Sailor along with the rest of his Broncos teammates and players of several other clubs, was aligned with Super League and so ineligible for selection in the 1995 State of Origin series or the end of season 1995 Rugby League World Cup. The following year, when all players were again allowed to be selected for representative football, Sailor's debut for the Queensland Maroons came in Game I of the 1996 State of Origin series. In Game II he played at fullback.

Following the 1997 defection Super League and all its clubs, Wendell had a stellar year in the rebel competition. He was the top try-scorer for the Broncos and helped them win Super League's expanded 1997 World Club Championship tournament and then the premiership, defeating the Cronulla-Sutherland Sharks 26–8 in the grand final. In the 1997 post season, Sailor was selected to play for Australia on the wing in all three matches of the Super League Test series against Great Britain.

After the Super League war ended, the Broncos won the inaugural competition of the National Rugby League, defeating the Canterbury Bulldogs 38–12 in the 1998 NRL grand final, in which Sailor scored a try. He then spent the Australian summer in England, playing rugby union for Leeds Tykes and scoring 15 tries in 13 games. Sailor also appeared in two of the Leeds Rhinos trial games, including the 'Festive Challenge' on Boxing Day in 1998. Playing Halifax, he had had a torrid time until the closing stages of the game when he inspired Leeds to grab a draw. England's Wigan club had tried to sign Sailor for a large amount, but he decided to stay with the Broncos.

In 1999 Sailor put in a man-of-the-match performance in the deciding match of the 1999 State of Origin series which saw Queensland retain the shield. At the end of the year he scored the match-winning try against New Zealand to clench the 1999 Tri-nations title for Australia. The following year Sailor was again the Broncos' top try-scorer (along with Lote Tuqiri). At the conclusion of the 1999 season, while on and end of season trip in Darwin, Sailor made a pact with his long time friend Kevin Walters to win the 2000 NRL Grand Final. He played for the Broncos on the wing and scored a try in their 2000 NRL grand final win over the Sydney Roosters, gaining himself another premiership ring. He was named the 2000 Brisbane Broncos season's Player of the Year and Best Back. In addition he received the Australian Sports Medal for his contribution to Australia's international standing in the sport of rugby league.

More success followed for Sailor as he traveled to Europe to compete in the 2000 Rugby League World Cup for Australia. He finished as the tournament's top try-scorer as well as boasting two tries in the victory over the Kiwis in the final. He was named best player of the tournament. Following the victory, Kangaroo coach Chris Anderson stated that "he's up there with Eric Grothe among the best of all time".

Following the World Cup, many speculated that Sailor, who was off contract with the Broncos after the 2001 NRL season, would sign for a club in the Super League competition, as many Australian rugby league stars do. Shortly before travelling to England with Brisbane for the 2001 World Club Challenge, Sailor declared he was "leaning towards" switching codes following advice from rugby union convert and former Broncos teammate Peter Ryan. Talks also apparently began with leading English Super League clubs Wigan, Leeds and Bradford. Having won the 2000 NRL Premiership, the Broncos traveled to England to play against 2000's Super League V Champions, St Helens R.F.C. for the 2001 World Club Challenge, with Sailor playing on the wing in Brisbane's loss. The Australian Rugby Union were able to put up the funds to lure Sailor to rugby union, making him the first incumbent Australian test rugby league player to change to the 15-man game after decades of the opposite trend. Sailor ran 4,452 metres with the ball over the 2001 NRL season, more than any other player in the competition.

Sailor is one of a handful of elite players to score over 100 tries for the club. He became the record co-holder of most tries in a Broncos match, with four.

During the 2007 season at the Broncos' 20-year anniversary celebration, the club announced a list of the 20 best players to play for them over the two decades since their inception in 1988 which included Sailor.

=== 2001–06: Rugby union ===
On 7 February 2001, it was announced by the Australian Rugby Union that they had reached an agreement with Sailor regarding a switch to Rugby union. Sailor signed a letter of intent with the ARU in February as well as signing with the Queensland Reds. The deal, worth approximately $700,000 per year, was formally completed in July, with Sailor set to leave League on the first day of November. He scored his first try in the Super 12 in his seventh match, where he scored twice and narrowly missed out on a hat-trick.

Sailor made his Wallaby debut with former Queensland Maroons teammate and league convert Mat Rogers in a Test match against France in June 2002. Collectively at that point they became the 41st and 42nd Australian dual code internationals. Sailor then released his book, Crossing Over which details the troubles he had in changing codes and describes the differences between the two. The following season he thrived and showed that he had made some good adaptations to his new game.

In 2003, Sailor was selected for the Wallabies to participate in that year's World Cup. He played in the opening match between Australia and Argentina, where he scored the first try of the tournament. Sailor played several games during the World Cup including the final.

Sailor came off contract with the Reds after the 2005 Super 12 season, the media speculated that he would either move to Japan or sign with new franchise Western Force. However, he signed with the New South Wales Waratahs to play in the 2006 season. The Waratahs won the opening game of the 2006 season at Suncorp Stadium against Queensland.

==== Cocaine controversy ====
On 13 May 2006, hours before the final pool match of the Super 14 competition, it was announced that Sailor was to be suspended indefinitely from representing either the NSW Waratahs or Australian Rugby Team after returning a positive drug test for cocaine. Sailor's manager confirmed in a statement it was a doping offence.

After the Australian Sports Anti-Doping Authority (ASADA) tests confirmed that Sailor's urine 'A' sample from the pre-match test had contained indicators of cocaine, Sailor chose to have the second half of his sample retested. The second test results were not published to the media within the timeframe expected, leading to speculation that Sailor's 'B' sample had proved inconclusive or been mishandled, thereby providing an opportunity for appeal. Eventually the 'B' sample results were announced, and proved to be positive.

The ARU immediately imposed a provisional suspension. When the matter was heard in the ARU Judicial Body, his legal team argued that he had not ingested cocaine within the 96 hours prior to the urine sample being taken. He further argued that he received no performance-enhancing benefits from cocaine, and that the clear scientific evidence is that cocaine is a short-acting stimulant that has effect for no more than two hours at most and that neither it nor its metabolites could have any performance enhancing benefit if taken more than 96 hours before a match.

When quizzed by counsel for the ARU, Sailor admitted that during previous drug tests he had received anti-doping information cards which carry the warning that all elite athletes are responsible for any banned substance in their system. When asked whether he was aware that cocaine is a banned substance, he confirmed that he did. The ARU upheld that whether Sailor considered the substance performance-enhancing or not, Sailor was aware that cocaine was a banned substance at the time of ingestion, and refused to reduce or overturn the ban.

On 23 July, Sailor penned a column in the Sunday Telegraph explaining his actions and apologising to his fans and family.

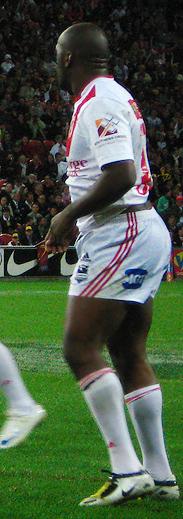
Sailor in 2008

=== 2008–09: Rugby league comeback ===
Since his exit from rugby union, several new streams of income have emerged for Sailor. He appeared on the television series, Dancing with the Stars. In addition, he provided NRL commentary for Channel Nine.

Speaking to a Sydney radio station in March 2007, Wendell stated he did not intend to let his career end in drug shame and that a number of NRL clubs had approached him in talks for his services once his ban ended in April 2008. He would not disclose which clubs had approached him. At the time, media speculation linked Sailor to the South Sydney Rabbitohs but in June 2007, it was announced that Sailor would be joining the St George Illawarra Dragons on a two-year incentive based contract when his ban expired in April 2008. Many former NRL players supported the move, believing that Sailor would have a positive impact on the young Dragons squad. On Monday, 12 May 2008, Sailor officially commenced his contract with the St. George Illawarra Dragons.

Sailor returned to rugby league playing initially for the Shellharbour Marlins (Dragons feeder team) in the New South Wales Cup. On 17 May, he scored two tries playing on the wing for Shellharbour at Ron Costello Oval. He played there for a further two weeks before moving up to the Dragons' NRL team. On 6 June, on the weekend preceding State of Origin game two, Sailor made his NRL comeback in a depleted St. George Illawarra lineup against his former club, the Brisbane Broncos.

Sailor played a few more games for the Dragons as well as the Burleigh Bears in the Queensland Cup whenever he did not make the St. George Illawarra NRL side. He scored his first NRL try since he left the League in 2001 against his former team the Brisbane Broncos in round 23. He later scored a hat-trick in the Dragons' 40–14 victory over the Eels in round 25.

Sailor was named in the 70-man Indigenous Australia squad alongside fellow Dragon Jamie Soward for the 2008 Rugby League World Cup. The Celtic Crusaders and French Rugby Union were looking to sign him for 2009, despite him having one more year on his contract with the Dragons.

For the 2009 season Sailor was re-united with the coach whom he began his professional career and won three premierships with, Wayne Bennett who had left the Brisbane broncos to coach the St. George Illawarra Dragons. Sailor was an influential figure in the Dragons side as he helped his side finish first in the regular season to gain the Minor Premiership. Sailor was recognised for his efforts as one of four nominees for the Dally M Winger of the year.

Sailor's 16-year career in professional sport came to an end when he announced his retirement at a press conference on 12 November 2009 at the age of 35. His final game for the Dragons was, fittingly, at Suncorp Stadium against his old side, the Broncos, in a match the Dragons lost 24–10. Coincidentally, his first game for the Dragons was also against the Broncos in a match won by the Dragons, but Sailor was injured in that match.

Sailor's final match was the 2010 All Stars game for the Indigenous team played at Skilled Park on the Gold Coast on 13 February 2010. He scored the opening try for the inaugural match and celebrated the try by picking up the corner post and played it like a didgeridoo with teammates dancing in the way of a corroboree.

== Television career ==
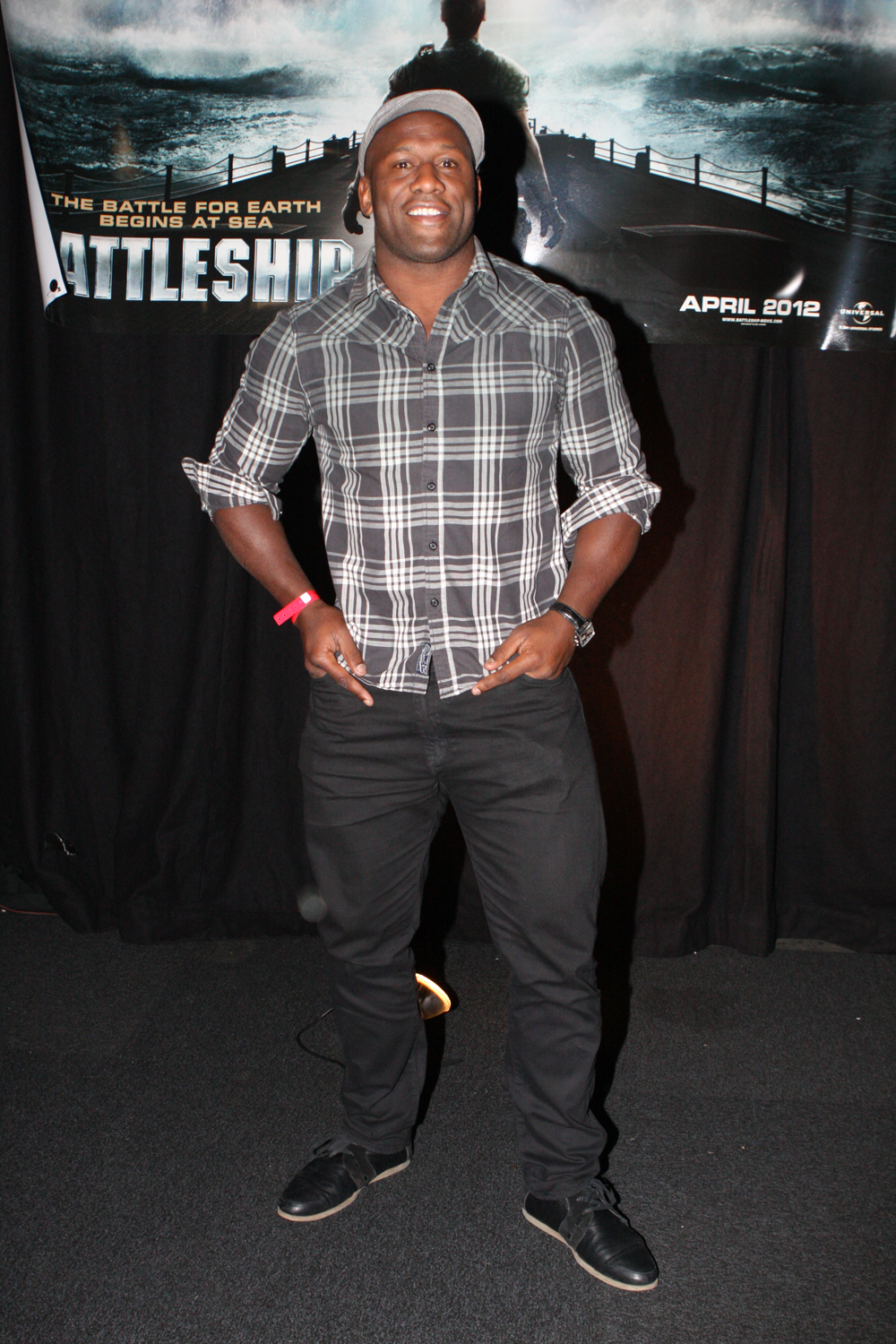
Sailor in 2012

Sailor was a contestant on Dancing with the Stars in 2006. In 2010, Sailor became a regular panelist on Channel Nine's The NRL Footy Show and was contestant on Australia's Greatest Athlete. He came last out of eight sporting competitors. In 2011, he became the co-host of Channel Seven's Australia's Greatest Athlete, alongside Mark Beretta, and was a panelist on Foxtel's NRL on FOX. In 2011 Sailor participated in The Celebrity Apprentice Australia. In 2012, Sailor appeared Monday and Friday mornings on Channel Ten Breakfast to preview and review all the NRL action. On 11 June 2015, Sailor appeared on an episode of The NRL Footy Show, where he competed in an 'Iron Arm Challenge' to raise money for charity, against former NRL player Ben Ross. During the proceedings, an accident occurred and Ross broke his arm before being immediately rushed to hospital.

In 2018, Sailor is to be sideline reporter on sports entertainment series Australian Spartan..

In 2019, Sailor appeared as 'the Rhino' in the first season of Network 10's The Masked Singer Australia.

== Personal life ==
On 6 December 2025, it was revealed that Sailor had been released on bail after allegedly being arrested for obstructing traffic by standing in a busy road at Wollongong. Sailor then allegedly wrestled with police before being subdued. It was reported that multiple calls had been made to police stating Sailor was running and yelling in the middle of the road. Bystanders reported that Sailor looked like he was under the influence of drugs and alcohol. On 23 February, Sailor pleaded guilty to resisting police following the late-night incident in Wollongong. He was released on bail and due to be sentenced on the 23 March 2026.

== See also ==
- List of players who have converted from one football code to another

Preceded by Tom Williams	Australia's Greatest Athlete; Host (with Mark Beretta); 2011	Succeeded by incumbent
