= Daine Laurie (rugby league, born 1984) =

Australian rugby league footballer

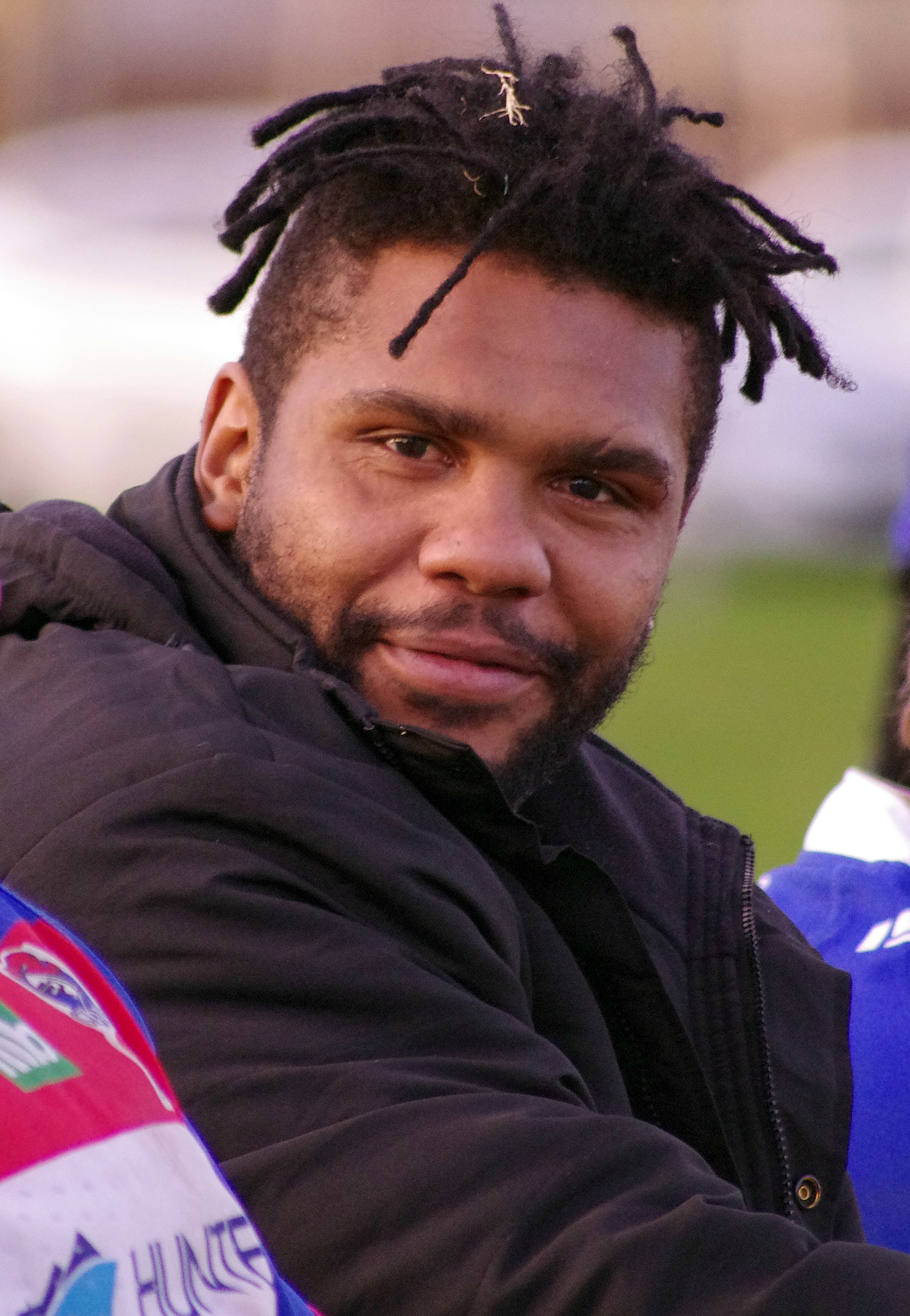

Personal information
- Full name: Daine Raymond Neil Laurie
- Born: 2 August 1984 (age 42) Yamba, New South Wales, Australia

Playing information
- Height: 198 cm (6 ft 6 in)
- Weight: 115 kg (18 st 2 lb)
- Position: Prop
Club
| Years | Team | Pld | T | G | FG | P |
|---|---|---|---|---|---|---|
| 2008–09 | Wests Tigers | 20 | 3 | 0 | 0 | 12 |
| 2010 | Penrith Panthers | 3 | 0 | 0 | 0 | 0 |
| | Total | 23 | 3 | 0 | 0 | 12 |
Representative
| Years | Team | Pld | T | G | FG | P |
| 2008 | Aboriginal Dreamtime | 1 | 0 | 0 | 0 | 0 |
- Relatives: Daine Laurie (nephew)

Daine Laurie (born 2 August 1984) is an Australian former professional rugby league footballer who played in the 2000s and 2010s. He played as a prop for the Wests Tigers and Penrith Panthers in the NRL.

== Playing career ==
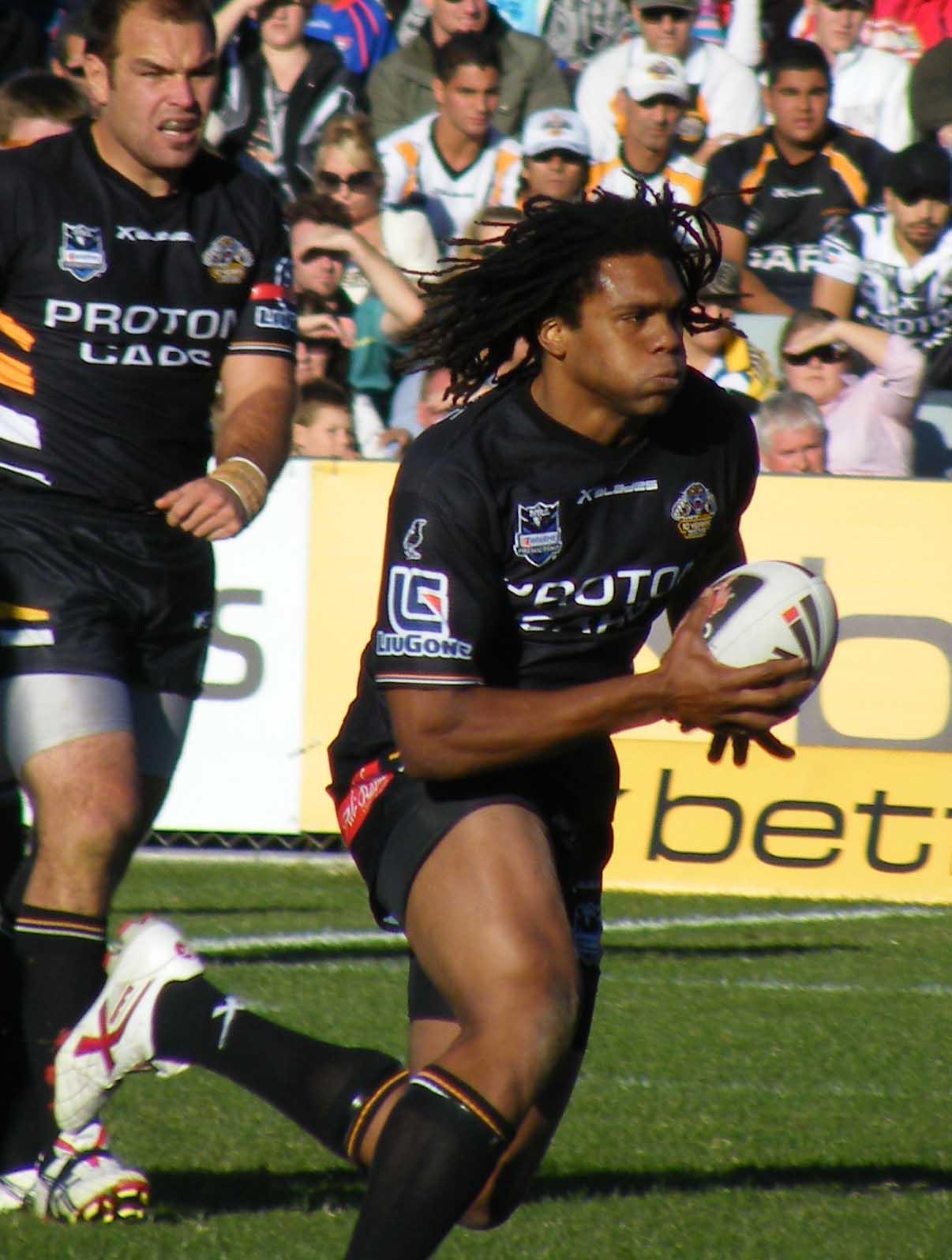
Laurie playing for the Tigers in 2009.

=== Wests Tigers ===
Born in Yamba, New South Wales, Laurie played junior football with the Yamba Dolphins before being signed by the Western Suburbs Magpies in the NSW Cup.

In June 2008, Laurie signed a 2-year with the Wests Tigers starting in the same year. In Round 15 of the 2008 NRL season he made his NRL debut against the Brisbane Broncos.

=== Penrith Panthers ===
In September 2009, Laurie signed a two-year deal to join the Penrith Panthers from the 2010 season. Laurie had been released from his contract with the Tigers and was facing criminal proceedings at the time, having been charged for allegedly assaulting his girlfriend, although the charge was later dismissed.

After joining the Panthers, Laurie made comments to the press that were critical of Wests Tigers and coach Tim Sheens. He stated that he "never felt welcome" and "it was nothing but negative at the Tigers." He made his debut for the Panthers in the 12–6 loss to the New Zealand Warriors at CUA stadium, after missing the first 17 rounds of the season due to, "niggling injuries." After this lone appearance, he missed the next training session with the club and was dropped back to NSW Cup. He ended up making 3 appearances for the season.

After the end of the 2010 season, Laurie joined the Saint-Gaudens Bears for a short-term contract to get some match experience before the start of the next season.

However, upon Laurie's return to Australia, he was not given a release to play for the Panthers, with a dispute with his French club over damage to a car. On 19 June 2011, Laurie was sacked from the Panthers for disciplinary reasons, having been accused of drinking on a flight to New Zealand to play a match for the Windsor Wolves. Laurie said of the matter, "Gus just called me out at training at around 2pm, and bang: "You gotta go, mate – hopefully, you can find another club."

=== Newcastle Rugby League ===
After being sacked by Penrith, Laurie signed for the Macquarie Scorpions in the Newcastle Rugby League.

=== Newcastle Knights ===
On 20 November 2011, Laurie signed a one-year deal with the Newcastle Knights for the 2012 season in an attempt to revive his NRL career under Wayne Bennett.

On 31 January 2010, Laurie made comments about fellow player Willie Mason saying, "Tell Willie Mason when I see him I'm going to slap him in the face, I'm gonna hurt him if he actually gets a start this year. [A friend] saw Willie out and was saying, 'How about Daine Laurie, he runs pretty hard and he's a pretty good player'," Laurie explained. "Then Willie told him 'Nah, he's a poor excuse for a footballer and is just a drunk'. And calling me a drunk! Is he serious? He loves a drink. Everyone knows that. If you can put that in the paper, then put it in the paper. I used to have nothing but respect for the guy until I heard that. But that's it." In 2012, Laurie and Mason played for the same team, the Newcastle Knights.

=== Wyong Roos ===
In 2013, Laurie joined stand-alone NSW Cup team, Wyong Roos. In 2017, it was revealed that Laurie had played for The South Grafton Rebels and The Lower Clarence Magpies in one of the local country competitions.

== Representative career ==
Laurie was selected as the starting second row forward for the Australian Aboriginal rugby league team for the exhibition match against the New Zealand Māori team that opened the 2008 World Cup. Laurie was also selected for the inaugural All Stars match for the Indigenous side but had to withdraw through injury and was replaced by Greg Bird.

== Personal life ==
On 19 June 2017, it was revealed that Laurie was facing intent to murder charges after two alleged shootings in Nambucca Heads.

It was reported on a northern NSW news website that after a stint in jail, Laurie was released in early 2021.
