= Travis Waddell =

Australian rugby league footballer

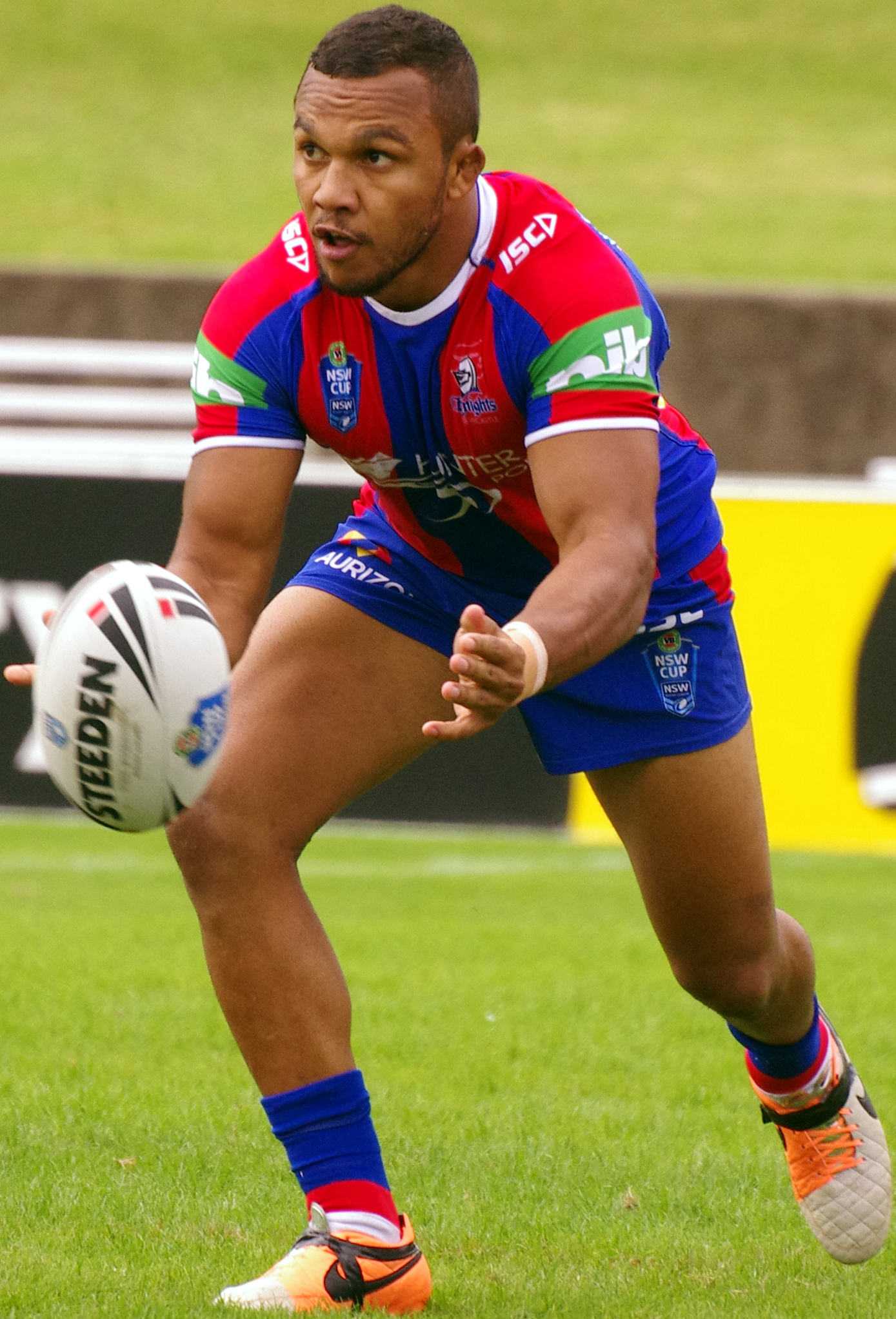
- Waddell playing for the Knights in 2014.

Personal information
- Born: 11 July 1989 (age 37) Proserpine, Queensland, Australia
- Height: 178 cm (5 ft 10 in)
- Weight: 91 kg (14 st 5 lb)

Playing information
- Position: Hooker
Club
| Years | Team | Pld | T | G | FG | P |
|---|---|---|---|---|---|---|
| 2009–12 | Canberra Raiders | 53 | 3 | 0 | 0 | 12 |
| 2013–14 | Newcastle Knights | 20 | 1 | 0 | 0 | 4 |
| 2016–17 | Brisbane Broncos | 5 | 0 | 0 | 0 | 0 |
| | Total | 78 | 4 | 0 | 0 | 16 |
Representative
| Years | Team | Pld | T | G | FG | P |
| 2010–13 | Indigenous All Stars | 4 | 0 | 0 | 0 | 0 |
| 2011 | Queensland Residents | 1 | 0 | 0 | 0 | 0 |
- Source: As of 22 February 2025
- Relatives: Dane Gagai (cousin); Jacob Gagai (cousin); Josh Hoffman (cousin); Daniel Motlop (cousin); Steven Motlop (cousin); Shannon Motlop (cousin); Marlon Motlop (cousin)

Travis Waddell (born 11 July 1989) is an Australian former professional rugby league footballer who most recently played for the Souths Logan Magpies in the Intrust Super Cup. He plays as a hooker. He previously played for the Canberra Raiders, Newcastle Knights and most recently the Brisbane Broncos in the National Rugby League.

== Background ==
Born in Proserpine, Queensland, Waddell played his junior football for the Proserpine Brahmans, before being signed by the Souths Logan Magpies.

== Playing career ==
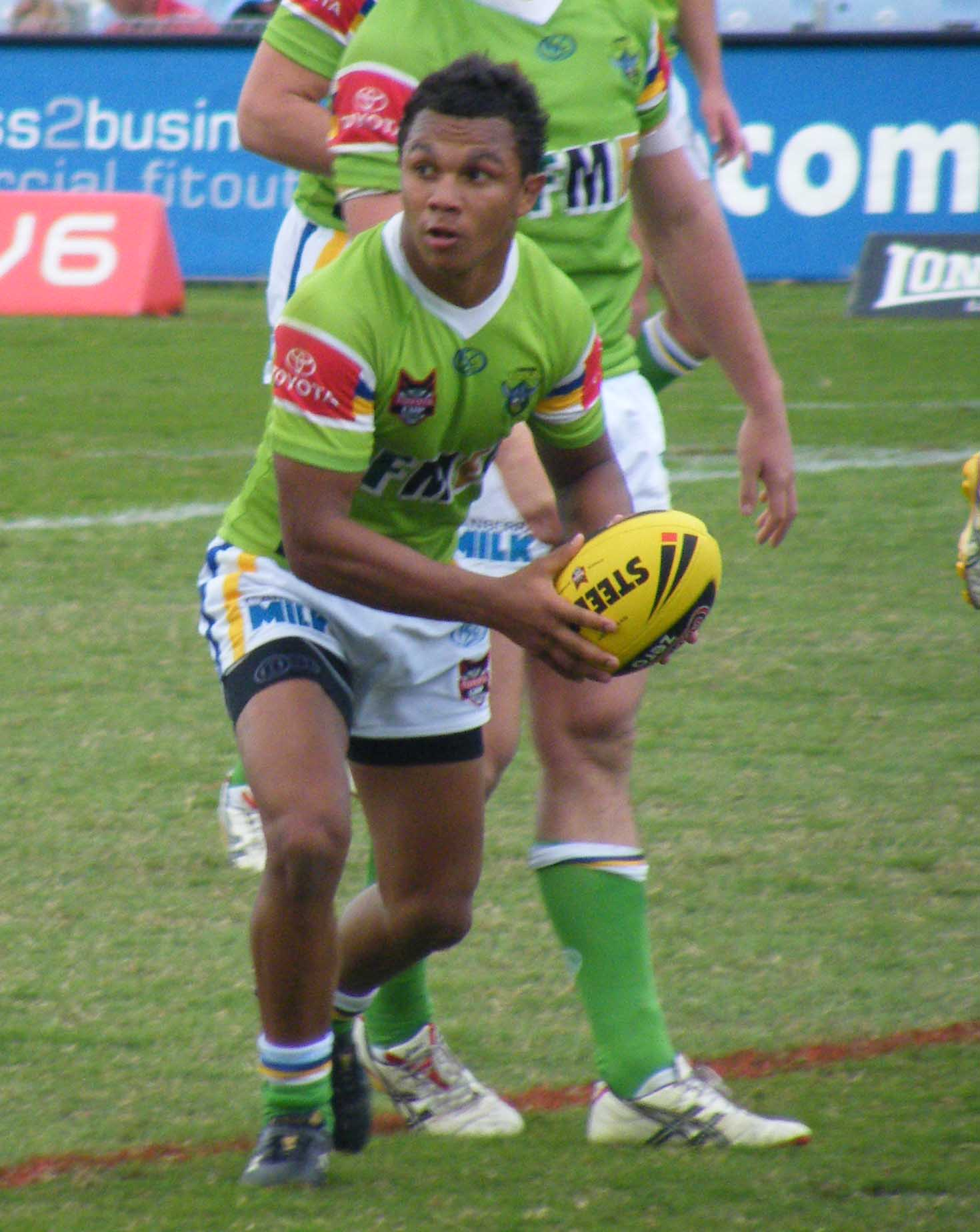
Waddell playing for the Raiders

=== Canberra ===
After a year with the Souths Logan Magpies, Waddell signed a contract with the Canberra Raiders. He played for Canberra's NYC team in 2008 and 2009, scoring 15 tries in 39 games.

In Round 3 of the 2009 NRL season, Waddell made his NRL debut for the Canberra side against Parramatta. At the end of 2009, Waddell was named at hooker in the NYC Team of the Year. In 2010, Waddell was selected in the inaugural Indigenous All Stars team to play the NRL All Stars at Skilled Park on the Gold Coast, Queensland. He was again selected in 2011, 2012 and 2013. Waddell was a regular in the Canberra team in 2010, despite being off the field for ten weeks with a broken jaw.

Waddell started 2011 again as a regular, but was demoted from the first-grade team as the capital club struggled, and joined feeder club Souths Logan Magpies for the remainder of the year. Waddell played 21 games for the Canberra outfit in 2012. At the end of the year he was released.

=== Newcastle ===
In 2013, Waddell returned to the Souths Logan Magpies in the Queensland Cup. However, in January, Newcastle coach, Wayne Bennett asked Waddell to come and train with the NRL team a week each month while still playing for Souths Logan, with Newcastle CEO Matthew Gidley revealing that Waddell would train with the team in case he was needed during the season for the Novocastrians.

On 4 March 2013, Waddell signed a two-year contract with the Newcastle Knights, three days before the start of the 2013 NRL season. In June 2013, the Newcastle side released Waddell back to the Souths Logan Magpies in the Queensland Cup for the remainder of the 2013 season but he returned to the club in 2014 on a full-time deal.

=== Brisbane ===
In September 2014, Newcastle Knights coach Wayne Bennett revealed that Waddell would be following him to the Brisbane Broncos in 2015 on a two-year contract. In 2021, Waddell signed with the Goondiwindi Boars as captain coach in the Toowoomba Rugby League competition. He led Goondiwindi to a Grand Final win that year. He was captain coach of Goondiwindi again in 2022.

== Statistics ==
| Year | Team | Games | Tries | Pts |
|---|---|---|---|---|
| 2009 | Canberra Raiders | 11 | 1 | 4 |
| 2010 | Canberra Raiders | 17 | 1 | 4 |
| 2011 | Canberra Raiders | 5 | | |
| 2012 | Canberra Raiders | 21 | 1 | 4 |
| 2013 | Newcastle Knights | 10 | | |
| 2014 | Newcastle Knights | 10 | 1 | 4 |
| 2016 | Brisbane Broncos | 4 | | |
| 2017 | Brisbane Broncos | 1 | | |
| | Totals | 78 | 4 | 16 |

== Personal life ==
Waddell's mother is from Badu Island in the Torres Strait, his father is, Aboriginal and from Darwin, Northern Territory. He is also of Vanuatuan descent.

Waddell is related to Newcastle Knights player Dane Gagai, Gold Coast Titans player Josh Hoffman and AFL players Daniel, Steven, Shannon and Marlon Motlop.
