= Sheen =

Sheen may refer to:

== Arts and entertainment ==
- Sheen (film), a 2004 Indian film
- Planet Sheen, a television series
- Sheen Estevez, character from the Nickelodeon series Jimmy Neutron
- Sheen Genus, a computer game character

== Places ==
- West Sheen or Sheen, an alternative name for Richmond, London, England
  - East Sheen or Sheen, a suburb in Richmond upon Thames
  - North Sheen, in the former Municipal Borough of Richmond
  - Sheen Priory, a monastery
- Sheen, Staffordshire, a village and civil parish in England
- Sheenboro, formerly Sheen Township and Sheen-Esher-Aberdeen-et-Malakoff United Township Municipality, Canada

== People ==
- Sheen (surname)
- Sheen Kaaf Nizam (born 1947), Indian Urdu poet and literary scholar
- Sheen T. Kassouf (1929–2006), American economist

== Other uses ==
- Shin (letter) (Šin) or Sheen, a Semitic alphanumeric character
- Paint sheen, measure of specular reflected light (glossiness) from a paint finish
- Sheen, a thin layer on a solid or liquid surface causing thin-film interference
- Mr Sheen, a cleaning product

== See also ==
- Sheene, a surname
- Bob Sheens, Australian rugby league footballer
- Tim Sheens (born 1950), Australian rugby league footballer and coach
- Sheena (disambiguation)
