= List of QAS Emerging Origin squads =

This article shows the players that have played been selected by the Queensland Rugby League (QRL) for the Queensland Academy of Sport (QAS) Emerging Origin squad. The squad meets for a weekend camp, usually held in January, run by the current Queensland State of Origin coach.

In earlier years, a player could be named in the next season's squad, despite already making their State of Origin debut. Since 2010, once a player has represented Queensland, they are deemed to have "graduated" from the squad and are not selected again. Since 2001, 66 players who have participated in the program have been selected to play for Queensland in State of Origin.

== 2001 ==
The inaugural Emerging Origin squad featured one player who had previously represented Queensland (Stuart Kelly in 1997), while Michael Ryan and Michael Luck were the only players in the squad who wouldn't play State of Origin during their careers. Two members, Chris Beattie and Nathan Fien, played for Queensland in the 2001 series.

Pos.	Player	Date of birth (age)	Club
Prop	Chris Beattie	26 August 1975 (aged 25)	Cronulla-Sutherland Sharks
Hooker	Shaun Berrigan	4 November 1978 (aged 22)	Brisbane Broncos
Fullback	Matt Bowen	9 March 1982 (aged 18)	North Queensland Cowboys
Second-row	Michael Crocker	21 June 1980 (aged 20)	Sydney Roosters
Halfback	Nathan Fien	1 August 1979 (aged 21)	North Queensland Cowboys
Lock	Chris Flannery	5 June 1980 (aged 20)	Sydney Roosters
Lock	Ashley Harrison	18 May 1981 (aged 19)	Brisbane Broncos
Centre	Shannon Hegarty	14 June 1979 (aged 21)	Sydney Roosters
Centre	Justin Hodges	25 May 1982 (aged 18)	Brisbane Broncos
Wing	Stuart Kelly	4 February 1976 (aged 24)	Brisbane Broncos
Lock	Micheal Luck	21 April 1982 (aged 18)	North Queensland Cowboys
Hooker	PJ Marsh	19 February 1980 (aged 20)	Parramatta Eels
Prop	Corey Parker	5 May 1982 (aged 18)	Brisbane Broncos
positions	Michael Ryan	9 May 1981 (aged 19)	Brisbane Broncos
Fullback	Clinton Schifcofske	10 November 1975 (aged 25)	Canberra Raiders

== 2002 ==
Just seven of the 17 players in the 2002 squad would go on to represent Queensland. Cameron Smith, the current Queensland captain and their most capped player, and Johnathan Thurston, Queensland's second most capped player and highest point scorer, were selected for the first time. Justin Hodges made his debut for Queensland in the 2002 series.

Pos.	Player	Date of birth (age)	Club
Prop	Ben Czislowski	8 April 1983 (aged 18)	Brisbane Broncos
Wing	Scott Donald	14 February 1980 (aged 21)	Parramatta Eels
Wing	Craig Frawley	19 August 1980 (aged 21)	Brisbane Broncos
Centre	Ashley Graham	4 June 1984 (aged 17)	Parramatta Eels
Centre	Justin Hodges	25 May 1982 (aged 19)	Sydney Roosters
Lock	Dallas Johnson	23 November 1982 (aged 19)	Melbourne Storm
Lock	Micheal Luck	21 April 1982 (aged 19)	North Queensland Cowboys
Hooker	Casey McGuire	14 January 1980 (aged 21)	Brisbane Broncos
Prop	Corey Parker	5 May 1982 (aged 19)	Brisbane Broncos
Second-row	Michael Russo	17 October 1983 (aged 18)	Melbourne Storm
Halfback	Brett Seymour	27 September 1984 (aged 17)	Brisbane Broncos
Hooker	Cameron Smith	18 June 1983 (aged 18)	Melbourne Storm
Five-eighth	Johnathan Thurston	25 April 1983 (aged 18)	Canterbury-Bankstown Bulldogs
Prop	Mark Tookey	9 March 1977 (aged 24)	Warriors
Second-row	Derrick Watkins	15 March 1983 (aged 18)	North Queensland Cowboys
Fullback	Brent Webb	9 November 1979 (aged 22)	Warriors
Wing	Ty Williams	27 November 1980 (aged 21)	North Queensland Cowboys

== 2004 ==
The 2004 squad featured seven players who had previously represented Queensland, while five members of the squad would make their State of Origin debut later that year. Brent Webb, Brett Seymour, Jaiman Lowe and Michael Witt were the only players who would not go onto represent Queensland during their careers. Webb, a Cairns Kangaroos junior playing for the New Zealand Warriors, would represent New Zealand later in the year under residency grounds, thus making him ineligible to play for Queensland.

Pos.	Player	Date of birth (age)	Club
Fullback	Matt Bowen	9 March 1982 (aged 21)	North Queensland Cowboys
Halfback	Nathan Fien	1 August 1979 (aged 24)	North Queensland Cowboys
Centre	Josh Hannay	11 January 1980 (aged 23)	North Queensland Cowboys
Lock	Dallas Johnson	23 November 1982 (aged 21)	Melbourne Storm
Prop	Jaiman Lowe	22 January 1983 (aged 20)	North Queensland Cowboys
Hooker	Casey McGuire	24 January 1980 (aged 23)	Brisbane Broncos
Prop	Brad Meyers	5 January 1980 (aged 23)	Brisbane Broncos
Prop	Corey Parker	5 May 1982 (aged 21)	Brisbane Broncos
Halfback	Scott Prince	27 February 1980 (aged 23)	Wests Tigers
Prop	Ben Ross	23 May 1980 (aged 23)	Penrith Panthers
Halfback	Brett Seymour	27 September 1984 (aged 19)	Brisbane Broncos
Fullback	Billy Slater	18 June 1983 (aged 20)	Melbourne Storm
Hooker	Cameron Smith	18 June 1983 (aged 20)	Melbourne Storm
Five-eighth	Johnathan Thurston	25 April 1983 (aged 20)	Canterbury-Bankstown Bulldogs
Wing	Chris Walker	27 February 1980 (aged 23)	Sydney Roosters
Fullback	Brent Webb	9 November 1979 (aged 24)	Warriors
Prop	Carl Webb	20 March 1981 (aged 22)	Brisbane Broncos
Fullback	Rhys Wesser	31 March 1979 (aged 24)	Penrith Panthers
Halfback	Michael Witt	1 January 1984 (aged 20)	Parramatta Eels

== 2005 ==
10 members of the 2005 Emerging Origin squad would represent Queensland during their careers. Ashley Harrison, Johnathan Thurston and Ty Williams all made their Origin debut in the 2005 series, while Carl Webb was recalled to the side after a four-year absence. Tom Learoyd-Lahrs, who was born and raised in the Northern Rivers region of New South Wales, was originally thought to be eligible for Queensland after joining the Broncos as a teenager but was later ruled ineligible. He later played four games for New South Wales.

Pos.	Player	Date of birth (age)	Club
Centre	Steven Bell	28 May 1976 (aged 28)	Melbourne Storm
Lock	Neville Costigan	16 March 1985 (aged 19)	Brisbane Broncos
Halfback	Nathan Fien	1 August 1979 (aged 25)	Warriors
Wing	Craig Frawley	19 August 1980 (aged 24)	Canberra Raiders
Wing	Craig Hall	6 November 1977 (aged 27)	Newcastle Knights
Lock	Ashley Harrison	18 May 1981 (aged 23)	South Sydney Rabbitohs
Fullback	Karmichael Hunt	17 November 1986 (aged 18)	Brisbane Broncos
Lock	Dallas Johnson	23 November 1982 (aged 22)	Melbourne Storm
Prop	Tom Learoyd-Lahrs	13 September 1985 (aged 19)	Brisbane Broncos
Hooker	Aaron Payne	18 January 1982 (aged 22)	North Queensland Cowboys
Second-row	Kirk Reynoldson	11 March 1979 (aged 25)	Newcastle Knights
Halfback	Brett Seymour	27 September 1984 (aged 20)	Brisbane Broncos
Lock	David Stagg	18 October 1983 (aged 21)	Brisbane Broncos
Five-eighth	Johnathan Thurston	25 April 1983 (aged 21)	North Queensland Cowboys
Prop	Shane Tronc	19 January 1982 (aged 22)	North Queensland Cowboys
Prop	Carl Webb	20 March 1981 (aged 23)	North Queensland Cowboys
Wing	Ty Williams	27 November 1980 (aged 24)	North Queensland Cowboys
Halfback	Michael Witt	1 January 1984 (aged 21)	Manly Warringah Sea Eagles

== 2006 ==
The 2006 squad featured 12 players who would be a part of Queensland's historic eight-straight series wins, with Steven Bell, Greg Inglis, Dallas Johnson Adam Mogg, Nate Myles, David Stagg and Sam Thaiday all making their Origin debuts later in the year. This would also be Nathan Fien's last appearance in the squad, as he would opt to represent New Zealand in 2006, making him ineligible to represent Queensland again.

Pos.	Player	Date of birth (age)	Club
Centre	Steven Bell	28 May 1976 (aged 29)	Manly Warringah Sea Eagles
Lock	Neville Costigan	16 March 1985 (aged 20)	Brisbane Broncos
Halfback	Cooper Cronk	5 December 1983 (aged 22)	Melbourne Storm
Prop	Richard Fa'aoso	8 May 1984 (aged 21)	Sydney Roosters
Halfback	Nathan Fien	1 August 1979 (aged 26)	Warriors
Wing	Craig Frawley	19 August 1980 (aged 25)	Canberra Raiders
Centre	Justin Hodges	25 May 1982 (aged 23)	Brisbane Broncos
Fullback	Karmichael Hunt	17 November 1986 (aged 19)	Brisbane Broncos
Centre	Greg Inglis	15 January 1987 (aged 18)	Melbourne Storm
Lock	Dallas Johnson	23 November 1982 (aged 23)	Melbourne Storm
Prop	Kris Kahler	13 February 1983 (aged 22)	Canberra Raiders
Prop	Jaiman Lowe	22 January 1983 (aged 22)	South Sydney Rabbitohs
Centre	Adam Mogg	31 July 1977 (aged 28)	Canberra Raiders
Second-row	Nate Myles	24 June 1985 (aged 20)	Canterbury-Bankstown Bulldogs
Hooker	Aaron Payne	18 January 1982 (aged 23)	North Queensland Cowboys
Halfback	Brett Seymour	27 September 1984 (aged 21)	Brisbane Broncos
Halfback	Tim Smith	13 January 1985 (aged 20)	Parramatta Eels
Lock	David Stagg	18 October 1983 (aged 22)	Brisbane Broncos
Second-row	Sam Thaiday	12 June 1985 (aged 20)	Brisbane Broncos
Centre	Willie Tonga	8 August 1983 (aged 22)	Canterbury-Bankstown Bulldogs
Prop	Shane Tronc	19 January 1982 (aged 23)	North Queensland Cowboys

== 2008 ==
Four players, Matt Ballin, David Shillington, Will Chambers and David Taylor, would go on to play State of Origin for Queensland.

Pos.	Player	Date of birth (age)	Club
Hooker	Matt Ballin	5 January 1984 (aged 23)	Manly Warringah Sea Eagles
Centre	Will Chambers	26 May 1988 (aged 19)	Melbourne Storm
Prop	David Shillington	24 June 1983 (aged 24)	Sydney Roosters
Prop	David Taylor	8 July 1988 (aged 19)	Brisbane Broncos

== 2009 ==
Four members of the 2009 squad would go onto represent Queensland in their careers, while Corey Parker had previously played State of Origin. Parker, who last played for Queensland in 2005, was recalled to their side for the 2009 series. Brett Seymour made his final appearance in the squad, as did Ashley Graham, who returned for the first time since 2002. David Shillington was the only player from the squad who made his Origin debut in that year's series.

Pos.	Player	Date of birth (age)	Club
Hooker	Matt Ballin	5 January 1984 (aged 24)	Manly Warringah Sea Eagles
Centre	Maurice Blair	16 October 1984 (aged 24)	Penrith Panthers
Centre	Will Chambers	26 May 1988 (aged 20)	Melbourne Storm
Wing	Ashley Graham	4 June 1984 (aged 24)	North Queensland Cowboys
Five-eighth	Ben Jones	24 June 1990 (aged 18)	Sydney Roosters
Prop	Nick Kenny	13 July 1982 (aged 26)	Brisbane Broncos
Lock	Micheal Luck	21 April 1982 (aged 26)	Warriors
Centre	Steve Michaels	13 January 1987 (aged 21)	Brisbane Broncos
Lock	Corey Parker	5 May 1982 (aged 26)	Brisbane Broncos
Halfback	Chris Sandow	9 January 1989 (aged 19)	South Sydney Rabbitohs
Second-row	Lagi Setu	25 February 1988 (aged 20)	Brisbane Broncos
Halfback	Brett Seymour	27 September 1984 (aged 24)	Cronulla-Sutherland Sharks
Prop	David Shillington	24 June 1983 (aged 25)	Canberra Raiders
Prop	David Taylor	8 July 1988 (aged 20)	Brisbane Broncos

== 2010 ==
The 2010 squad was the first to start the tradition of not selecting players with State of Origin experience. Just three players from the squad went onto to play State Origin, with David Taylor making his debut in that year's series.

Pos.	Player	Date of birth (age)	Club
Second-row	Matthew Bell	31 August 1981 (aged 28)	Penrith Panthers
Centre	Maurice Blair	16 October 1984 (aged 25)	Penrith Panthers
Prop	Scott Bolton	9 May 1987 (aged 22)	North Queensland Cowboys
Prop	Richard Faʻaoso	8 May 1984 (aged 25)	Newcastle Knights
Lock	Ben Lowe	13 March 1985 (aged 24)	South Sydney Rabbitohs
Hooker	Andrew McCullough	30 January 1990 (aged 19)	Brisbane Broncos
Centre	Steve Michaels	13 January 1987 (aged 22)	Gold Coast Titans
Halfback	Chris Sandow	9 January 1989 (aged 20)	South Sydney Rabbitohs
Prop	David Taylor	8 July 1988 (aged 21)	South Sydney Rabbitohs
Centre	Joe Tomane	11 February 1990 (aged 19)	Gold Coast Titans
Centre	Esi Tonga	5 February 1988 (aged 21)	Gold Coast Titans
Wing	Daniel Vidot	8 February 1990 (aged 19)	Canberra Raiders
Wing	Jharal Yow Yeh	22 December 1989 (aged 20)	Brisbane Broncos
Fullback	William Zillman	30 July 1986 (aged 23)	Gold Coast Titans

== 2011 ==
Pos.	Player	Date of birth (age)	Club
Fullback	Ben Barba	13 June 1989 (aged 21)	Canterbury-Bankstown Bulldogs
Second-row	Matthew Bell	31 August 1981 (aged 29)	Penrith Panthers
Halfback	Daly Cherry-Evans	20 February 1989 (aged 21)	Manly Warringah Sea Eagles
Hooker	Jake Friend	4 February 1990 (aged 20)	Sydney Roosters
Second-row	Matt Gillett	12 August 1988 (aged 22)	Brisbane Broncos
Prop	Martin Kennedy	20 February 1989 (aged 21)	Sydney Roosters
Lock	Ben Lowe	13 March 1985 (aged 25)	South Sydney Rabbitohs
Five-eighth	Robert Lui	23 February 1990 (aged 20)	Wests Tigers
Centre	Dane Nielsen	10 June 1985 (aged 25)	Melbourne Storm
Centre	Justin O'Neill	4 April 1991 (aged 19)	Melbourne Storm
Second-row	Ben Te'o	27 January 1987 (aged 23)	Brisbane Broncos
Wing	Daniel Vidot	8 February 1990 (aged 20)	Canberra Raiders
Wing	Jharal Yow Yeh	22 December 1989 (aged 21)	Brisbane Broncos
Fullback	William Zillman	30 July 1986 (aged 24)	Gold Coast Titans

== 2012 ==
Pos.	Player	Date of birth (age)	Club
Fullback	Ben Barba	13 June 1989 (aged 22)	Canterbury-Bankstown Bulldogs
Centre	Maurice Blair	16 October 1984 (aged 27)	Melbourne Storm
Halfback	Daly Cherry-Evans	20 February 1989 (aged 22)	Manly Warringah Sea Eagles
Centre	Dale Copley	29 July 1991 (aged 20)	Brisbane Broncos
Hooker	Jake Friend	4 February 1990 (aged 21)	Sydney Roosters
Second-row	Matt Gillett	12 August 1988 (aged 23)	Brisbane Broncos
Prop	Martin Kennedy	20 February 1989 (aged 22)	Sydney Roosters
Lock	Josh McGuire	2 March 1990 (aged 21)	Brisbane Broncos
Second-row	Chris McQueen	3 August 1987 (aged 24)	South Sydney Rabbitohs
Centre	Justin O'Neill	4 April 1991 (aged 20)	Melbourne Storm
Halfback	Chris Sandow	9 January 1989 (aged 23)	Parramatta Eels
Prop	Lama Tasi	3 May 1990 (aged 21)	Sydney Roosters
Second-row	Ben Te'o	27 January 1987 (aged 24)	Brisbane Broncos
Centre	Esi Tonga	5 February 1988 (aged 23)	Parramatta Eels

== 2013 ==
Pos.	Player	Date of birth (age)	Club
Fullback	Ben Barba	13 June 1989 (aged 23)	Canterbury-Bankstown Bulldogs
Halfback	Daly Cherry-Evans	20 February 1989 (aged 23)	Manly Warringah Sea Eagles
Centre	Dale Copley	29 July 1991 (aged 21)	Brisbane Broncos
Second-row	Aidan Guerra	25 February 1988 (aged 24)	Sydney Roosters
Prop	Martin Kennedy	20 February 1989 (aged 23)	Sydney Roosters
Wing	Edrick Lee	18 September 1992 (aged 20)	Canberra Raiders
Hooker	Andrew McCullough	30 January 1990 (aged 22)	Brisbane Broncos
Lock	Josh McGuire	2 March 1990 (aged 22)	Brisbane Broncos
Second-row	Chris McQueen	3 August 1987 (aged 25)	South Sydney Rabbitohs
Five-eighth	Michael Morgan	27 December 1991 (aged 21)	North Queensland Cowboys
Centre	Justin O'Neill	4 April 1991 (aged 21)	Melbourne Storm
Second-row	Josh Papalii	13 May 1992 (aged 20)	Canberra Raiders
Second-row	Ben Ridge	13 December 1989 (aged 23)	Gold Coast Titans
Fullback	William Zillman	30 July 1986 (aged 26)	Gold Coast Titans

== 2014 ==
Pos.	Player	Date of birth (age)	Club
Fullback	Ben Barba	13 June 1989 (aged 24)	Brisbane Broncos
Centre	Will Chambers	26 May 1988 (aged 25)	Melbourne Storm
Hooker	Jake Friend	4 February 1990 (aged 23)	Sydney Roosters
Centre	Dane Gagai	3 January 1991 (aged 23)	Newcastle Knights
Second-row	Aidan Guerra	25 February 1988 (aged 25)	Sydney Roosters
Prop	Martin Kennedy	20 February 1989 (aged 24)	Brisbane Broncos
Prop	Brenton Lawrence	29 December 1984 (aged 29)	Manly Warringah Sea Eagles
Wing	Edrick Lee	18 September 1992 (aged 21)	Canberra Raiders
Five-eighth	Anthony Milford	11 July 1994 (aged 19)	Canberra Raiders
Five-eighth	Michael Morgan	27 December 1991 (aged 22)	North Queensland Cowboys
Prop	Dylan Napa	13 November 1992 (aged 21)	Sydney Roosters
Centre	Justin O'Neill	4 April 1991 (aged 22)	Melbourne Storm
Hooker	James Segeyaro	11 November 1990 (aged 23)	Penrith Panthers
Prop	Korbin Sims	2 January 1992 (aged 22)	Newcastle Knights

== 2015 ==
Pos.	Player	Date of birth (age)	Club
Second-row	Gavin Cooper	19 August 1985 (aged 29)	North Queensland Cowboys
Centre	Dale Copley	29 July 1991 (aged 23)	Brisbane Broncos
Hooker	Jake Friend	4 February 1990 (aged 24)	Sydney Roosters
Centre	Dane Gagai	3 January 1991 (aged 24)	Newcastle Knights
Prop	Tim Glasby	27 April 1989 (aged 25)	Melbourne Storm
Wing	Valentine Holmes	24 July 1995 (aged 19)	Cronulla-Sutherland Sharks
Halfback	Ben Hunt	27 March 1990 (aged 24)	Brisbane Broncos
Prop	Brenton Lawrence	29 December 1984 (aged 30)	Manly Warringah Sea Eagles
Wing	Edrick Lee	18 September 1992 (aged 22)	Canberra Raiders
Lock	Josh McGuire	2 March 1990 (aged 24)	Brisbane Broncos
Five-eighth	Anthony Milford	11 July 1994 (aged 20)	Brisbane Broncos
Centre	Tautau Moga	6 December 1993 (aged 21)	North Queensland Cowboys
Five-eighth	Michael Morgan	27 December 1991 (aged 23)	North Queensland Cowboys
Prop	Dylan Napa	13 November 1992 (aged 22)	Sydney Roosters
Hooker	James Segeyaro	11 November 1990 (aged 24)	Penrith Panthers
Prop	Korbin Sims	2 January 1992 (aged 23)	Newcastle Knights
Wing	Corey Thompson	15 May 1990 (aged 24)	Canterbury-Bankstown Bulldogs
Prop	David Tyrrell	9 October 1988 (aged 26)	South Sydney Rabbitohs

== 2016 ==
Pos.	Player	Date of birth (age)	Club
Second-row	Jayson Bukuya	21 April 1989 (aged 26)	Cronulla-Sutherland Sharks
Centre	Dale Copley	29 July 1991 (aged 24)	Sydney Roosters
Prop	Tim Glasby	27 April 1989 (aged 26)	Melbourne Storm
Hooker	Jake Granville	7 February 1989 (aged 26)	North Queensland Cowboys
Second-row	Chris Grevsmuhl	23 February 1993 (aged 22)	South Sydney Rabbitohs
Wing	Valentine Holmes	24 July 1995 (aged 20)	Cronulla-Sutherland Sharks
Halfback	Ben Hunt	27 March 1990 (aged 25)	Brisbane Broncos
Wing	Edrick Lee	18 September 1992 (aged 23)	Canberra Raiders
Second-row	Ethan Lowe	20 March 1991 (aged 24)	North Queensland Cowboys
Wing	Nene Macdonald	11 May 1994 (aged 21)	Gold Coast Titans
Five-eighth	Moses Mbye	13 August 1993 (aged 22)	Canterbury-Bankstown Bulldogs
Five-eighth	Anthony Milford	11 July 1994 (aged 21)	Brisbane Broncos
Five-eighth	Cameron Munster	13 September 1994 (aged 21)	Melbourne Storm
Prop	Dylan Napa	13 November 1992 (aged 23)	Sydney Roosters
Prop	Joe Ofahengaue	15 September 1995 (aged 20)	Brisbane Broncos
Centre	Justin O'Neill	4 April 1991 (aged 24)	North Queensland Cowboys
Wing	Corey Oates	20 October 1994 (aged 21)	Brisbane Broncos
Prop	Lloyd Perrett	17 December 1994 (aged 21)	Canterbury-Bankstown Bulldogs
Prop	Korbin Sims	2 January 1992 (aged 24)	Newcastle Knights
Prop	Jarrod Wallace	23 July 1991 (aged 24)	Brisbane Broncos

== 2017 ==
Pos.	Player	Date of birth (age)	Club
Second-row	Jayson Bukuya	21 April 1989 (aged 27)	Cronulla-Sutherland Sharks
Centre	Dale Copley	29 July 1991 (aged 25)	Sydney Roosters
Wing	Kyle Feldt	9 February 1992 (aged 24)	North Queensland Cowboys
Prop	Tim Glasby	27 April 1989 (aged 27)	Melbourne Storm
Hooker	Jake Granville	7 February 1989 (aged 27)	North Queensland Cowboys
Second-row	Coen Hess	14 August 1996 (aged 20)	North Queensland Cowboys
Wing	Valentine Holmes	24 July 1995 (aged 21)	Cronulla-Sutherland Sharks
Halfback	Ben Hunt	27 March 1990 (aged 26)	Brisbane Broncos
Second-row	Felise Kaufusi	19 May 1992 (aged 24)	Melbourne Storm
Wing	Edrick Lee	18 September 1992 (aged 24)	Canberra Raiders
Second-row	Ethan Lowe	20 March 1991 (aged 25)	North Queensland Cowboys
Wing	Nene Macdonald	11 May 1994 (aged 22)	St George Illawarra Dragons
Five-eighth	Moses Mbye	13 August 1993 (aged 23)	Canterbury-Bankstown Bulldogs
Five-eighth	Anthony Milford	11 July 1994 (aged 22)	Brisbane Broncos
Five-eighth	Cameron Munster	13 September 1994 (aged 22)	Melbourne Storm
Prop	Dylan Napa	13 November 1992 (aged 24)	Sydney Roosters
Prop	Lloyd Perrett	17 December 1994 (aged 22)	Canterbury-Bankstown Bulldogs
Halfback	Ashley Taylor	17 March 1995 (aged 21)	Gold Coast Titans
Prop	Jarrod Wallace	23 July 1991 (aged 25)	Gold Coast Titans
Prop	Christian Welch	19 July 1994 (aged 22)	Melbourne Storm

== 2018 ==
Pos.	Player	Date of birth (age)	Club
Lock	Jai Arrow	12 July 1995 (aged 22)	Gold Coast Titans
Wing	Kyle Feldt	9 February 1992 (aged 25)	North Queensland Cowboys
Second-row	Felise Kaufusi	19 May 1992 (aged 25)	Melbourne Storm
Centre	Brenko Lee	10 October 1995 (aged 22)	Gold Coast Titans
Second-row	Ethan Lowe	20 March 1991 (aged 26)	North Queensland Cowboys
Centre	Tautau Moga	6 December 1993 (aged 24)	Newcastle Knights
Five-eighth	Corey Norman	3 February 1991 (aged 26)	Parramatta Eels
Prop	Lloyd Perrett	17 December 1994 (aged 23)	Manly Warringah Sea Eagles
Fullback	Kalyn Ponga	30 March 1998 (aged 19)	Newcastle Knights
Halfback	Ashley Taylor	17 March 1995 (aged 22)	Gold Coast Titans
Prop	Christian Welch	19 July 1994 (aged 23)	Melbourne Storm

== 2019 ==
Pos.	Player	Date of birth (age)	Club
Fullback	AJ Brimson	9 September 1998 (aged 20)	Gold Coast Titans
Halfback	Jake Clifford	2 January 1998 (aged 21)	North Queensland Cowboys
Halfback	Brodie Croft	4 July 1997 (aged 21)	Melbourne Storm
Wing	Kyle Feldt	9 February 1992 (aged 26)	North Queensland Cowboys
Second-row	David Fifita	25 February 2000 (aged 18)	Brisbane Broncos
Centre	Brenko Lee	10 October 1995 (aged 23)	Gold Coast Titans
Wing	Nene Macdonald	11 May 1994 (aged 24)	North Queensland Cowboys
Second-row	Rhyse Martin	1 March 1993 (aged 25)	Canterbury-Bankstown Bulldogs
Centre	Tautau Moga	6 December 1993 (aged 25)	Newcastle Knights
Five-eighth	Corey Norman	3 February 1991 (aged 27)	St George Illawarra Dragons
Prop	Joe Ofahengaue	15 September 1995 (aged 23)	Brisbane Broncos
Wing	Phillip Sami	2 August 1997 (aged 21)	Gold Coast Titans
Second-row	Jaydn Su'A	23 October 1997 (aged 21)	Brisbane Broncos
Halfback	Ashley Taylor	17 March 1995 (aged 23)	Gold Coast Titans
Prop	Christian Welch	19 July 1994 (aged 24)	Melbourne Storm
