= Daly Cherry-Evans =

Australia international rugby league footballer

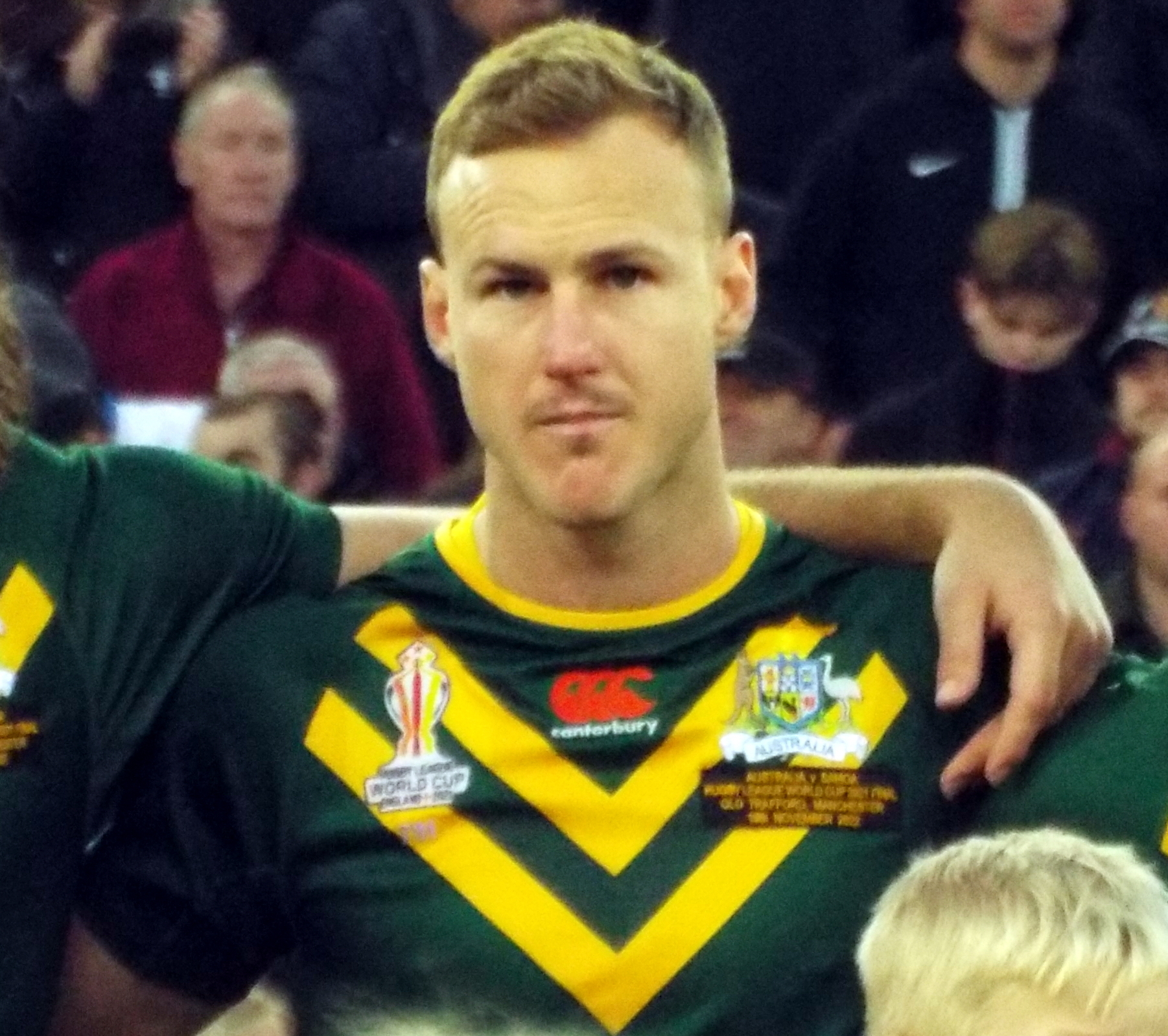

Personal information
- Full name: Daly Cherry-Evans
- Born: 20 February 1989 (age 37) Redcliffe, Queensland, Australia
- Height: 183 cm (6 ft 0 in)
- Weight: 85 kg (13 st 5 lb)

Playing information
- Position: Halfback, Five-eighth
Club
Years	Team	Pld	T	G	FG	P
2011–25	Manly Sea Eagles	352	98	205	29	831
2026	Sydney Roosters	27	7	2	3	35
2027–	Hull FC	0	0	0	0	0
	Total	379	105	207	32	866
Representative
Years	Team	Pld	T	G	FG	P
2010	Queensland Residents	1	1	2	0	8
2011–23	Australia	21	5	3	0	26
2013–25	Queensland	26	2	5	0	18
2018–23	Prime Minister's XIII	3	2	0	0	8
2019	Australia 9s	4	1	2	0	8
- Source: As of 20 November 2026

Daly Cherry-Evans (born 20 February 1989) is Australian professional rugby league footballer who plays for Hull FC in the English Super League. Regarded as one of the best halfbacks in rugby league history, he is known for his game reading tactics, fitness, longevity and ability to kick match-winning field goals under pressure on either foot.

Cherry-Evans previously played for and captained the Manly Sea Eagles, winning the 2011 NRL Grand Final in his rookie season and the Clive Churchill Medal as best on ground in the 2013 NRL Grand Final. Cherry-Evans played for the Sydney Roosters in 2026, kicking the match winning field goal in the 2026 NRL Grand Final, winning his second NRL premiership. He played for Queensland in State of Origin, captaining the side with distinction from 2019-2025, leading arguably the greatest upset in Origin history in 2020. He played for Australia at international level, and was a vice-captain in Tests and co-captained the title-winning inaugural 9's side in 2019. He captained the Prime Ministers XIII in 2018 and 2022 and vice-captained in 2023.

Cherry-Evans holds the record for most games for Manly, most games for Manly as captain, most NRL games as halfback, most NRL tries as halfback, most field goals, try assists and 40/20s in the NRL era, longest gap between NRL titles (15 years), the oldest player in State of Origin history, the oldest Origin captain, and most consecutive games as a halfback at State of Origin level.

== Personal life ==
Cherry-Evans was born in Redcliffe, Queensland, Australia to an English-born mother and an Australian father. His father, Troy Evans, played as a hooker for the Norths Devils and Redcliffe Dolphins in the Brisbane Rugby League premiership during the 1980s and 1990s.

He began playing rugby league for the Redcliffe Dolphins at five-years-old. At 12 years of age Cherry-Evans moved to Mackay, Queensland with his family and continued to play junior rugby league for Mackay Brothers, Sarina Crocodiles and South's Sharks. He attended St Patrick's College during his high school years. He also attended Redcliffe State High School in Year 12 and played for the school's rugby league team. At the beginning of 2008 Cherry-Evans was invited by Dennis Moore to trial with the Manly-Warringah Sea Eagles and later signed a contract to play for their under-20s National Youth Competition team.

Daly is married to his long-time partner, Vessa Rockliff and have three daughters together. The couple married in late November 2024 in Manly, Sydney, after being together for many years. The ceremony was attended by several NRL stars, including Kieran Foran and the Trbojevic brothers.

== Playing career ==
=== National Youth Competition (2008–09) ===
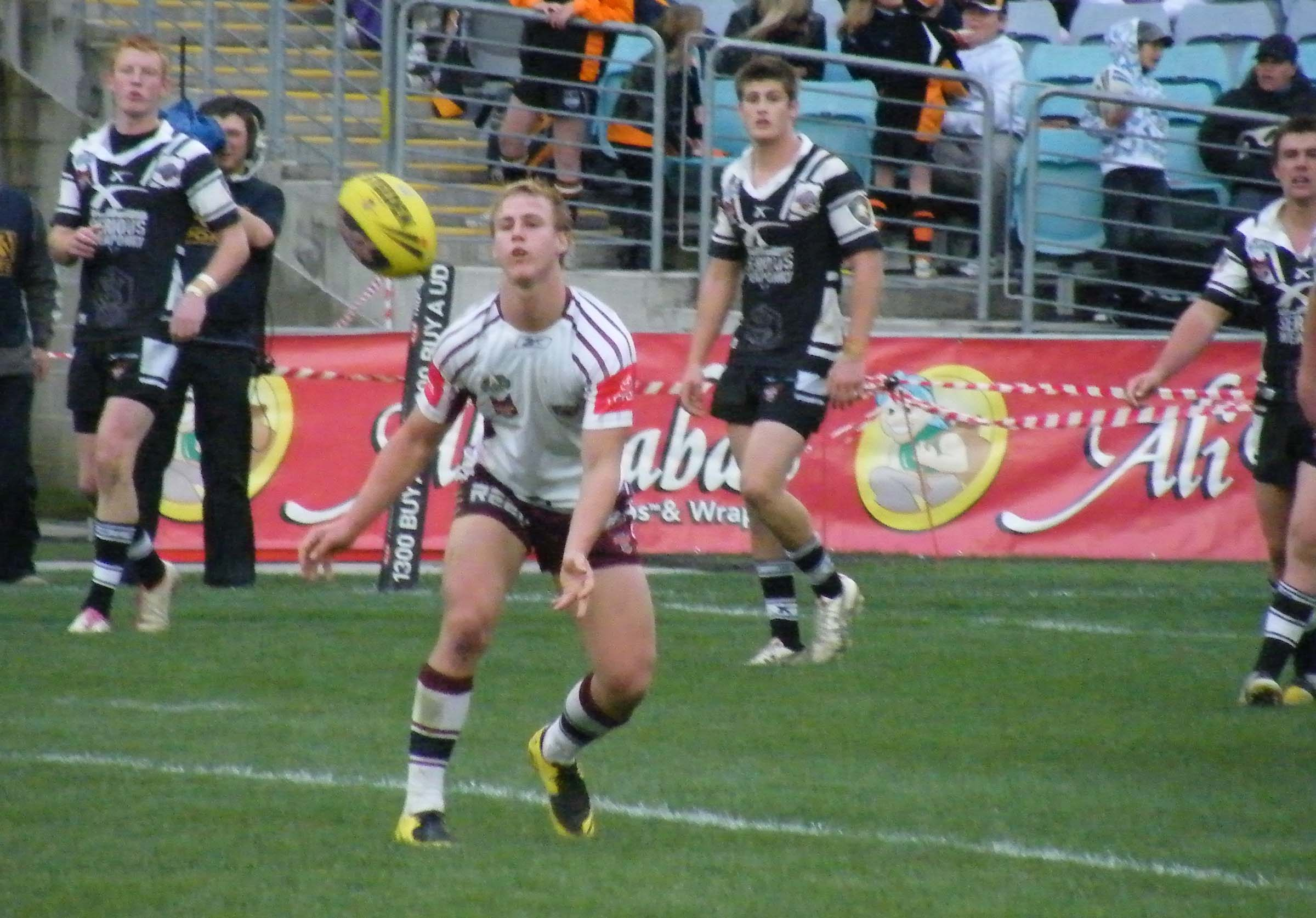
Cherry-Evans in 2008.

Cherry-Evans played 46 games for the National Youth Competition team of Manly Sea Eagles over the 2008 and 2009 season where he scored 246 points in total including 24 tries.

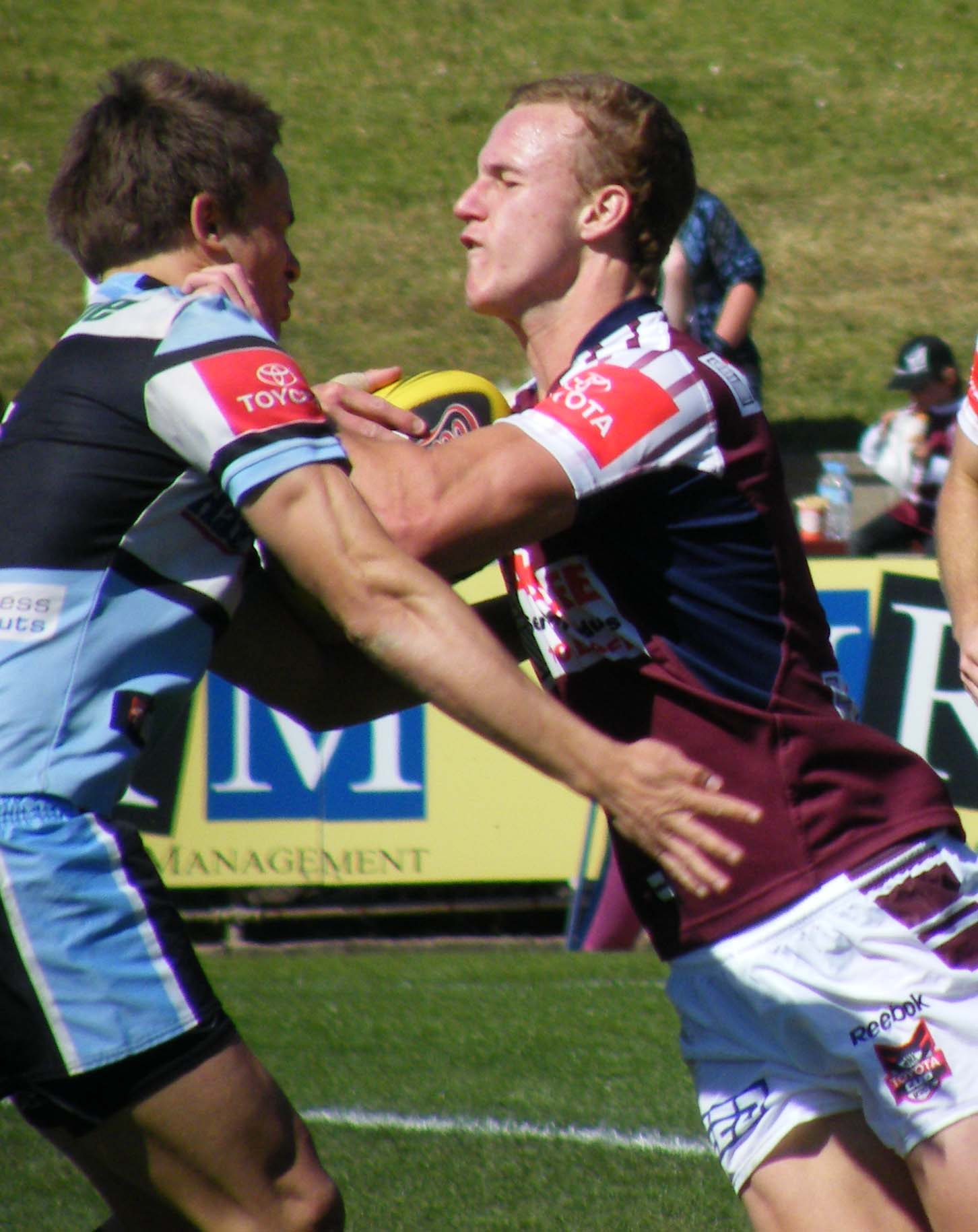
Cherry-Evans playing for Manly in 2009

He was named on the interchange bench of the 2009 Toyota Cup season's team of the year.

=== Queensland Cup (2010) ===
At the conclusion of the 2009 Toyota Cup season, Cherry-Evans found himself behind Trent Hodkinson as Manly's first grade halfback after the departure of club captain Matt Orford. As a result, Cherry-Evans was sent to play for Manly's Queensland Cup feeder club the Sunshine Coast Sea Eagles. His performances in the side saw him selected as the Queensland Residents halfback and captain. After captaining the Sunshine Coast Sea Eagles for most of the season, Cherry-Evans was named the Queensland Cup Best and Fairest, Rookie of the Year and runner-up to Player of The Year.

=== 2011 ===
With Hodkinson moving to play for the Canterbury Bulldogs, Cherry-Evans made his debut for Manly in Round 1 of the 2011 NRL season against the Melbourne Storm at halfback in the Sea Eagles 18–6 loss at AAMI Park.

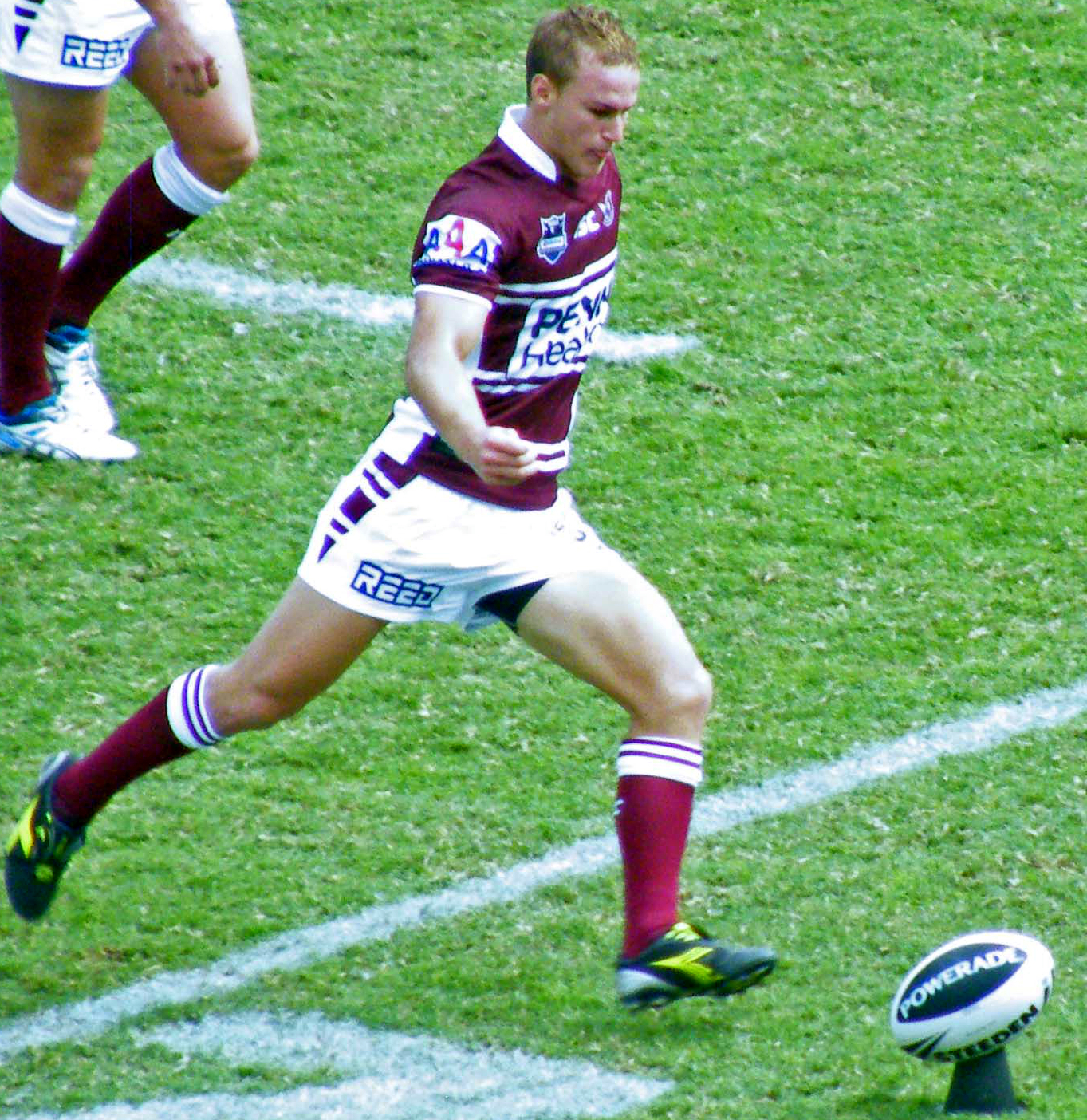
Cherry-Evans playing for the Sea Eagles in 2011

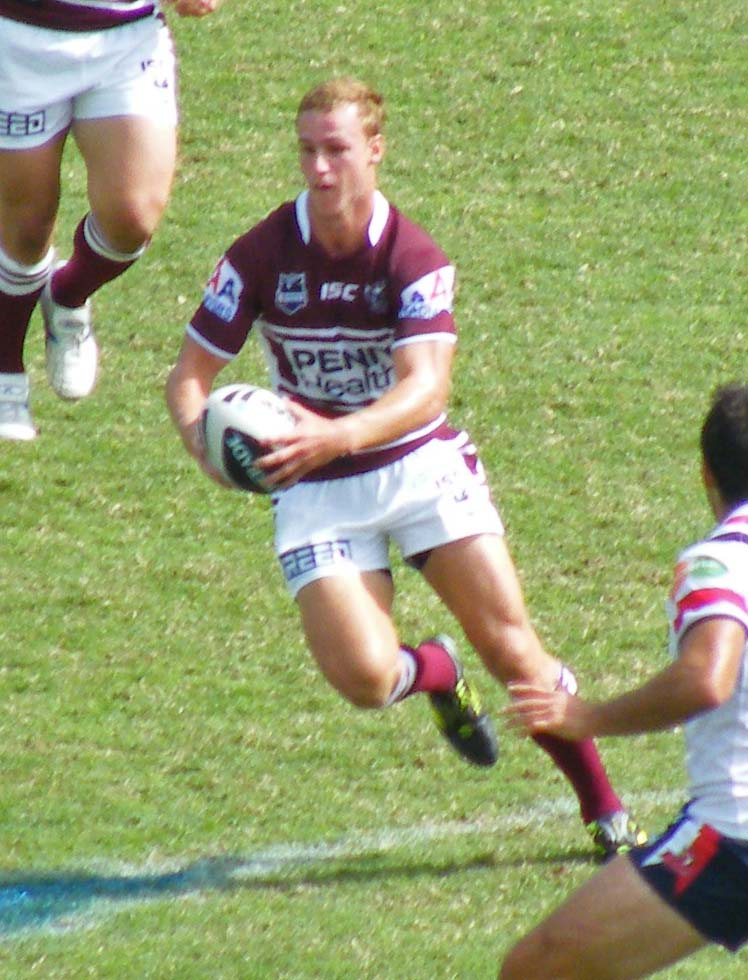
DCE playing for Manly in 2011

In Round 12 against the Brisbane Broncos at Suncorp Stadium, Cherry-Evans scored his first NRL career try in the Sea Eagles 34–10 victory, one of which was set up by a flick pass from Fullback Brett Stewart who while diving for the ball had scooped it up one handed and passed to Cherry-Evans in the same movement. In round 13 against the Bulldogs, Cherry-Evans crossed the try line untouched from a scrum, performed a one-on-one strip on Dene Halatau, and had 3 try assists in a dominating display that saw him named as halfback in the BigPond Sport Team of the Week. In October 2011, English coach Steve McNamara offered Cherry-Evans a starting spot on the England team for the 2011 Four Nations as he is eligible for England through his English born mother Kellie. Cherry-Evans declined the offer, declaring himself available only to play representative football for both Queensland and Australia should he be selected.

Cherry-Evans won the 2011 Dally M Rookie of the Year award, and scored a try in Manly's victory over the New Zealand Warriors in the 2011 NRL grand final. He gave a perfect inside pass for Brett Stewart to score the first try of the match in the 30th minute of the game. His own try just before the game's half time was set up by an audacious grubber kick by Clive Churchill Medal winner Glenn Stewart. The Manly Lock grubber kicked for winger Michael Robertson on his own 20 metre line. Robertson regathered and raced 50 metres down field, evading a desperate tackle from Manu Vatuvei, before passing to Matt Ballin who continued the run until tackled only 5 metres out from scoring. On the next play Cherry-Evans received the ball from halves partner Kieran Foran, threw two dummy-passes and scored next to the posts to give the Sea Eagles a match winning 12–2 lead after Lyon's conversion. Manly went on to defeat the Warriors 24–10 to win their 8th premiership, with DCE the first rookie halfback to lead his team to premiership success since "Slippery" Steve Morris won with St George in 1979.

Cherry-Evans finished his debut year in the NRL in the 2011 NRL season with him playing in all 27 Manly-Warringah Sea Eagles matches, scoring seven tries, kicking 25 goals and threee field goals. He was named by the Rugby League International Federation in its annual awards as the world's best halfback for 2011.

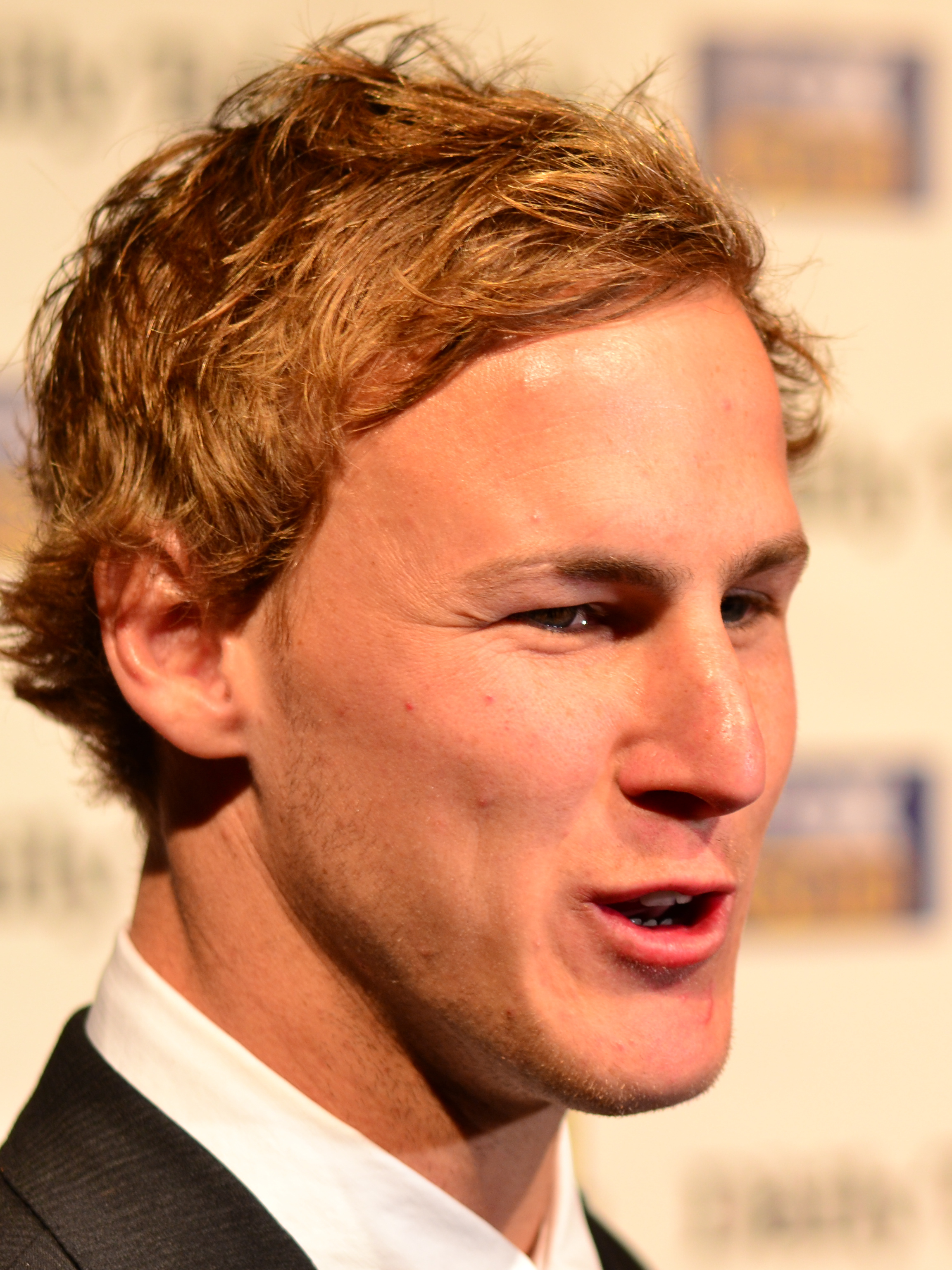
Cherry-Evans at the 2012 Dally M Awards

=== 2012 ===
In March 2012, Cherry-Evans management formally requested a release for the 2013 NRL season, believing he was being underpaid on a modest $85,000 contract. Just over a week later, Cherry-Evans re-signed on a significantly upgraded contract, worth a reported $500,000 with Manly until the end of the 2015 season.

Cherry-Evans played in all 27 Manly Warringah Sea Eagles matches and scored seven tries, kicked three goals and kicked one field goal during the 2012 NRL season.

=== 2013 ===
Since he made his debut for Manly in Round 1 of the 2011 NRL season, Cherry-Evans had not missed a single game of the NRL. Due to his selection for Queensland in Game III of the 2013 Origin series, Cherry-Evans missed his first game for the Sea Eagles, missing their Round 18 clash with North Queensland in Townsville.

In October 2013, Cherry-Evans won the Clive Churchill Medal as Man of the Match in the 2013 NRL Grand Final v Sydney Roosters in a 26–18 defeat. Cherry-Evans is the third player since the award's inception in 1986 to win the Medal from a losing Grand Final side and one of four who have achieved the honour, joining Canberra's Bradley Clyde (1991), St George's Brad Mackay (1993) and Canberra's Jack Wighton (2019).

Cherry-Evans played in 27 matches, scored 11 tries and kicked 2 field goals for the Sea Eagles in the 2013 NRL season.

=== 2014 ===
On 14 February 2014, Cherry-Evans was selected in the Sea Eagles inaugural 2014 Auckland Nines squad.

In August 2014, Cherry-Evans played his 100th NRL career match in Round 24 in a 22–12 loss v the Parramatta Eels at Parramatta Stadium.

In September 2014, Cherry-Evans played in his fourth straight finals series, having led Manly to the top four in his first four NRL seasons consecutively. Manly lost 40–24 to eventual premiers South Sydney Rabbitohs in the Qualifying Final at Allianz Stadium. Manly hosted the Semi Final v Canterbury-Bankstown Bulldogs at Allianz. Cherry-Evans kicked a field goal with a minute left on the clock to equal scores 17-all, sending the game to Golden Point before former Manly half Trent Hodkinson kicked the winning field goal for the Bulldogs, ending Manly's season. Cherry-Evans was selected in the Australian Four Nations train-on squad. Cherry-Evans was named 2014 Dally M Halfback of the Year at the 2014 Dally M Awards.

Cherry-Evans played in 23 matches, scored a career-low season tally of 3 tries and kicked an equal career-high season tally of 4 field goals for Manly in the 2014 NRL season.

=== 2015 ===
In January 2015, Cherry-Evans captained the Sea Eagles during the 2015 Auckland Nines competition. His team lost each of its matches throughout the pre-season competition.

On 6 March 2015, Cherry-Evans revealed he had agreed to join the Gold Coast Titans team in 2016 on a four-year contract. He changed his mind to stay with the Sea Eagles on an eight-year deal on 3 June, before the NRL's Round 13 cooling off period expired. During the announcement, Cherry-Evans was quoted as saying: "I definitely left the door open for this speculation to continue because, to be honest, I was always curious to know what offer was going to be on the table from Manly". He was subsequently booed at later games in Brisbane and the Gold Coast. The deal was rumoured to be over $10m AUD or $1.25m per season.

In September 2015, Manly failed to make the finals for the first time in Cherry-Evans career, finishing ninth. Cherry-Evans played in 23 matches and scored four tries during the 2015 NRL season.

=== 2016 ===
In March 2016, Cherry-Evans suffered a high ankle sprain during Round 4 v Sydney Roosters in a 22–20 win, requiring a moon boot and ruled out for a month.

In June 2016, Cherry-Evans suffered his second ankle injury for the season during Manly's 30–18 loss to Canberra Raiders in Round 13 after he scored the opening try of the match. Expected to miss four games, Cherry-Evans only missed 2 games, returning in Round 16.

In September 2016, Manly failed to make the finals for a second straight season, finishing 13th. Cherry-Evans played a career-low season tally of 19 matches, scored 5 tries and kicked 2 field goals during the 2016 NRL season.

=== 2017 ===
On 13 January 2017, following the retirement of long time Manly premiership winning captain Jamie Lyon, Cherry-Evans was named as Manly's club captain for the 2017 NRL season. Cherry-Evans hit back at former critics by having a great 2017 season, leading the Sea Eagles to their first finals series since 2014, where they were defeated in the first round by the Penrith Panthers. Cherry-Evans was named Player of the Year by the Manly Warringah Sea Eagles at the end of the 2017 season, having played all 25 games, scoring 6 tries, and kicking 9 goals.

=== 2018 ===
On 28 May, Cherry-Evans was not selected to play in Queensland's State of Origin team for the series opener for the 2018 State of Origin series. On 2 July, Cherry-Evans was recalled to the Queensland Origin team as halfback for Game 3 of the 2018 State of Origin series.

During the 2018 season, Cherry-Evans played 24 games, scoring 8 tries and kicking 65 goals. Even though Manly finished 15th at the end of the 2018 NRL season, he was a stand out and was recalled to the Australian Test team, selected as halfback and vice-captain for both of the Test matches against both New Zealand and Tonga, scoring a try against Tonga in a 34–16 win at Mt Smart Stadium.

=== 2019 ===
In Round 3, Cherry-Evans scored 2 tries and kicked 7 goals as Manly defeated the New Zealand Warriors 46–12. On 27 May, Cherry-Evans was picked to play at Halfback for the Queensland Maroons side and was also picked as the 15th Captain of the Queensland Maroons side. Cherry-Evans played in all 3 games of the 2019 State of Origin series as Queensland lost the series 2–1.

In Round 19, Cherry-Evans kicked the winning field goal in golden point extra-time as Manly defeated Melbourne 11–10 at AAMI Park.

Cherry-Evans made a total of 21 appearances for Manly in the 2019 NRL season as the club finished 6th on the table and qualified for the finals. Cherry-Evans played in both finals matches as Manly reached the elimination semi-final against South Sydney but were defeated 34–26 ending their season. On 7 October, Cherry-Evans was named in the Australian side for the Oceania Cup fixtures.

=== 2020 ===
Cherry-Evans made a total of 20 appearances for Manly-Warringah in the 2020 NRL season as the club finished a disappointing 13th on the table.

=== 2021 ===
In round 5 of the 2021 NRL season, Cherry-Evans kicked a field goal for Manly-Warringah in the final seconds of the game to defeat the New Zealand Warriors 13–12. It was Manly's first win of the year having lost the opening four games.

In round 7, Cherry-Evans scored two tries for Manly in a 40–6 victory over the Wests Tigers. In round 19, he scored two tries for Manly in a 44–24 victory over the Wests Tigers. Cherry-Evans played 25 games for Manly in the 2021 NRL season including the club's preliminary final loss against South Sydney.

=== 2022 ===
In round 3 of the 2022 NRL season, Cherry-Evans kicked the winning field goal late in the match to earn Manly their first win of the season over Canterbury with a 13–12 victory.

Cherry-Evans played a total of 22 games for Manly in the 2022 NRL season as the club finished 11th on the table missing the finals.

In October, he was named in the Australia squad for the 2021 Rugby League World Cup.

=== 2023 ===
In round 1 of the 2023 NRL season, Cherry-Evans scored his first career hat-trick in Manly's 31–6 victory over Canterbury. Cherry-Evans played all three games for Queensland in the 2023 State of Origin series as Queensland won the shield 2–1. Cherry-Evans played 22 games for Manly in the 2023 NRL season as the club finished 12th on the table and missed the finals.

=== 2024 ===
In round 5 of the 2024 NRL season, Cherry-Evans became Manly's record appearance holder overtaking Cliff Lyons. Manly would win 32–18 in the milestone game. In round 18, Cherry-Evans kicked the winning field goal in Manly's golden point extra-time victory over North Queensland. Cherry-Evans played 24 games for Manly in the 2024 NRL season as they finished 7th on the table and qualified for the finals. Manly would be eliminated in the second week of the finals by the Sydney Roosters.

=== 2025 ===
On 24 March, Cherry-Evans informed Manly that he would not be with the club in 2026. Hours later while the news was being reported on air on Fox Sports, Manly announced that they were tabling a new offer for Cherry-Evans. Cherry-Evans confirmed on 100% Footy that he will not accept the offer. On 27 March, Cherry-Evans officially rejected the Sea Eagles offer for a two year extension. In May, Cherry-Evans was picked by Queensland ahead of game one in the 2025 State of Origin series. On 9 June, Cherry-Evans was not retained for game two with Tom Dearden taking his place in the team. In round 27, Cherry-Evans played his final game for Manly in their 27–26 victory over New Zealand with Cherry-Evans kicking the game winning field goal.

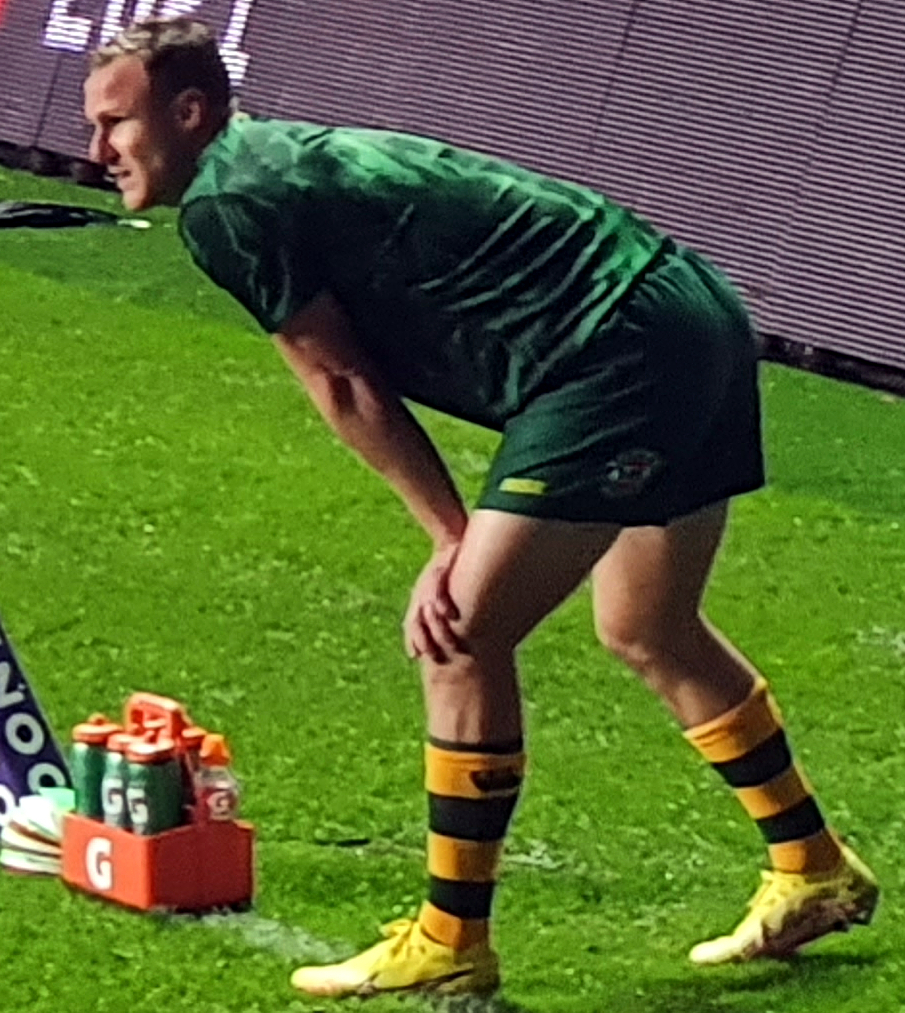
Cherry-Evans warming down for Australia in 2022

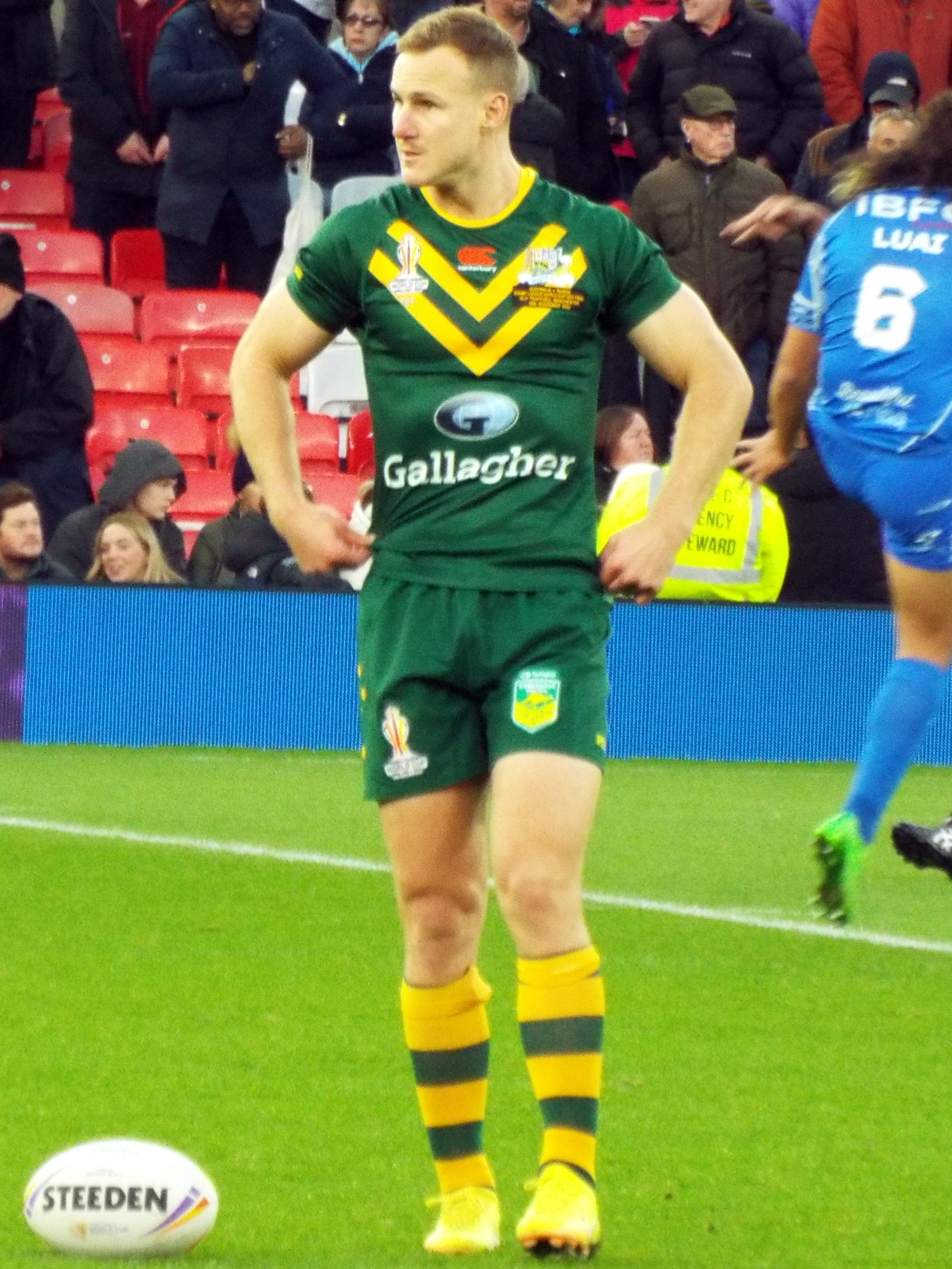
Cherry-Evans warming up for Australia in 2022

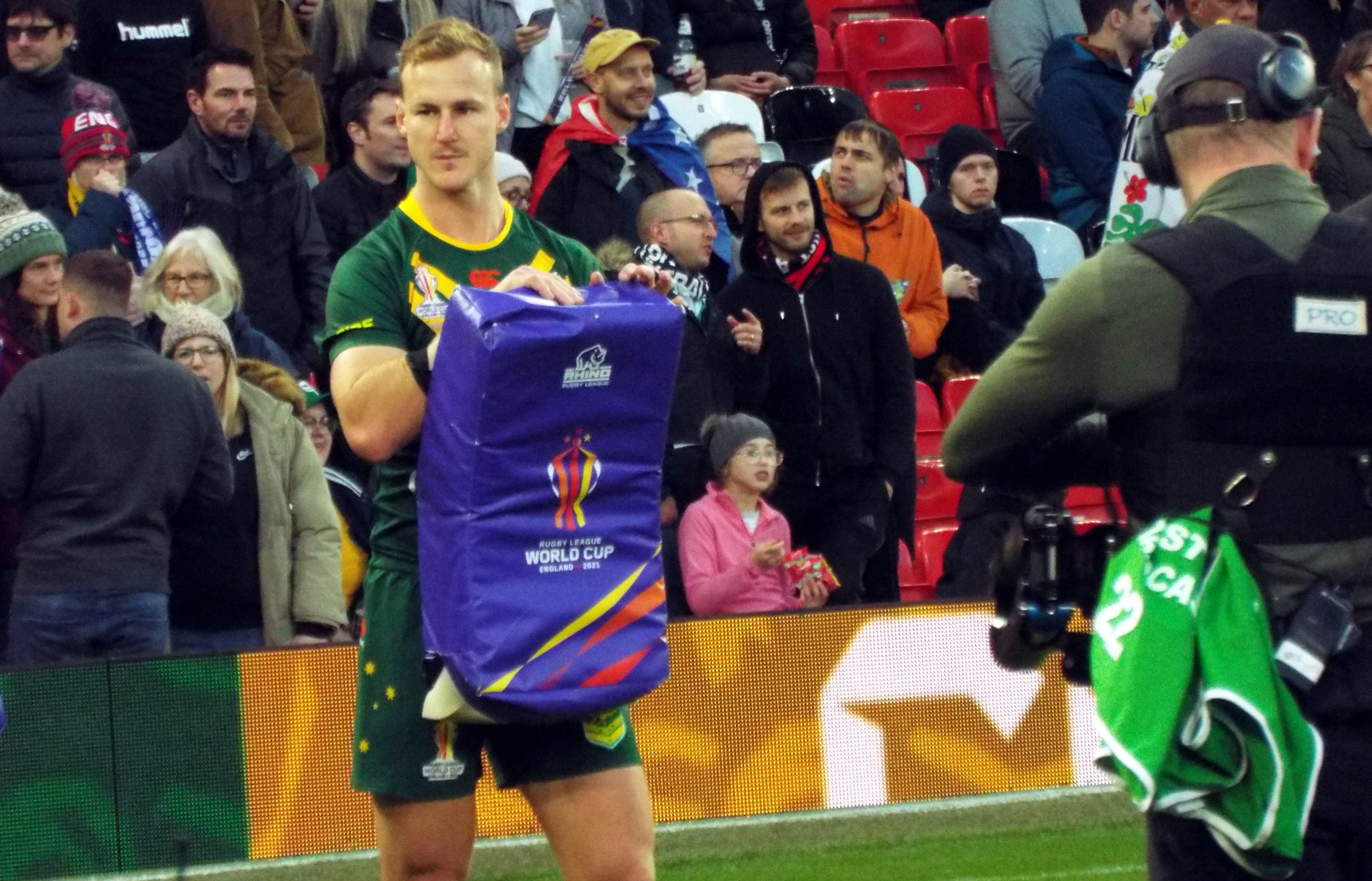
Cherry-Evans warming up for the Kangaroos at the 2021 RLWC Final

On 7 November, Cherry-Evans signed with the Sydney Roosters on a one year deal for the 2026 season, with a player option for a second year; the signing came after months of speculation.

=== 2026 ===
In round 1 of the 2026 NRL season, Cherry-Evans made his highly anticipated debut for the Sydney Roosters against the New Zealand Warriors which ended in a 42–18 loss. Cherry-Evans played five-eighth for the first time in his NRL career with Sam Walker playing halfback.

In Round 4, Cherry-Evans played against Manly for the first time, at Brookvale. The Sydney Roosters won 33–16 with Manly terminating head coach Anthony Seibold's contract within 24 hours.

On 14 August 2026, Cherry-Evans announced his departure from the NRL at the end of the 2026 season and signed a one-year deal with Hull F.C. for the 2027 Super League season.

Cherry-Evans claimed his second premiership as the Sydney Roosters defeated the Newcastle Knights 19-18 in the 2026 NRL Grand Final. Cherry-Evans scored a crucial field goal to help extend the clubs lead.

== Statistics ==
Season	Team	Games	Tries	Goals	F/G	Points
2011 †	Manly-Warringah Sea Eagles	27	7	25	3	81
2012	Manly-Warringah Sea Eagles	27	7	3	1	35
2013	Manly-Warringah Sea Eagles	27	11	0	2	46
2014	Manly-Warringah Sea Eagles	23	3	–	4	16
2015	Manly-Warringah Sea Eagles	23	5	0	–	20
2016	Manly-Warringah Sea Eagles	19	5	–	2	22
2017	Manly-Warringah Sea Eagles	25	6	9	4	46
2018	Manly-Warringah Sea Eagles	24	8	65	2	164
2019	Manly-Warringah Sea Eagles	21	5	21	2	64
2020	Manly-Warringah Sea Eagles	20	6	12	1	49
2021	Manly-Warringah Sea Eagles	25	9	1	2	40
2022	Manly-Warringah Sea Eagles	22	5	15	2	52
2023	Manly-Warringah Sea Eagles	22	9	20	1	72
2024	Manly-Warringah Sea Eagles	24	8	16	2	66
2025	Manly-Warringah Sea Eagles	23	5	19	1	59
2026 †	Sydney Roosters	27	7	0	3	35
2027	Hull FC	0	0	0	0	0
Total		379	105	206	32	866

^{Last updated: 13 October 2026}

== Honours ==
Individual

- Dally M Rookie of The Year: 2011
- RLPA Rookie of The Year: 2011
- Manly-Warringah Sea Eagles Ken Arthurson Rookie of The Year: 2011
- RLIF Halfback of The Year: 2011, 2013
- Manly-Warringah Sea Eagles Gordon Willoughby Medal – Members Player of The Year: 2013, 2018, 2020, 2023, 2024
- Clive Churchill Medal: 2013
- Dally M Halfback of The Year: 2014
- Spirit of ANZAC Medal: 2015
- Manly-Warringah Sea Eagles Captain: 2017, 2018, 2019, 2020, 2021, 2022, 2023, 2024, 2025
- Manly-Warringah Sea Eagles Roy Bull Best and Fairest: 2017, 2020, 2023
- Australia Kangaroos Vice-Captain: 2018, 2019
- Queensland Maroons Captain: 2019, 2020, 2021, 2022, 2023, 2024, 2025
- Manly-Warringah Sea Eagles Steve Menzies Medal – Play of the Year: 2019 (Game-winning field goal in golden point win over Melbourne Storm Rd19)
- RLPA Halfback of The Year: 2019
- Australia 9s Co-Captain: 2019
- Dick "Tosser" Turner Medal: 2023
- Manly-Warringah Sea Eagles Players' Player: 2023

Club

- 2011 NRL Grand Final Winners
- 2012 World Club Challenge Runner-up
- 2013 NRL Grand Final Runner-up
- 2026 NRL Grand Final Winners

Representative

- 2013 State of Origin series Winners
- 2013 World Cup Winners
- 2015 State of Origin series Winners
- 2019 World Cup 9s Winners
- 2020 State of Origin series Winners
- 2022 State of Origin series Winners
- 2022 World Cup Winners
- 2023 State of Origin series Winners
- 2025 State of Origin series Winners

== Records ==
Individual

- National Rugby League Most Field Goals (32)
- National Rugby League Most Tries as Halfback (98)
- National Rugby League Most Games as Halfback (355)

Club

- Manly Sea Eagles Most Games (352)
- Manly Sea Eagles Most Games as Captain (206)

Representative

- State of Origin series Most Consecutive Games as Halfback (20)
- State of Origin series Oldest Player (36 years and 96 days)
- State of Origin series Oldest Captain (36 years and 96 days)

== Controversy ==
On 21 April 2018, Cherry-Evans was fined $10,000 by Manly after an altercation with fellow Manly player Jackson Hastings. The incident involving Hastings and Cherry-Evans resulted in Hastings being ostracised from the playing group. An altercation on the training field in the lead-up to the side's 32–20 loss to The Gold Coast carried forward when the players attended a Gladstone strip club after the game and then flared up even further at the team hotel later in the night. Hastings left the club due to continued altercations with Cherry-Evans and subsequently played in the Super League and back in the NRL for the Wests Tigers.

In June 2018, former teammate Willie Mason claimed that when he was at Manly that nobody wanted to play alongside Cherry-Evans and that he was the reason there was such a divide at the club. Mason went on to say "I was there in 2015, I've never seen, never been involved in a team, that I could just see such a divide in a club, It was because of Cherry-Evans. All this shit that's been happening around him, like, something's wrong, "He then signed with the Gold Coast Titans for like 10 years", Mason said. "And then there was a big fucking meeting, Cherry-Evans has got something to say. "I just signed a deal with the Titans boys, blah blah blah". "I'm like, who gives a fuck, you don't hold a meeting about that. No one cared".

Mason's comments came in the wake of former Manly player Anthony Watmough commenting on a podcast calling Cherry-Evans a "fuckwit" and that he was the reason other players needed to depart the club.

== Representative rugby league career ==
=== Allegiance ===
Although Cherry-Evans was born in Redcliffe, the fact that his mother was born in England made him eligible to represent either Australia or England at the test level. In 2011, England coach Steve McNamara offered Cherry-Evans a starting spot on the English team for the 2011 Four Nations tournament. Cherry-Evans declined the offer, declaring himself available only to play representative football for both Queensland and Australia should he be selected.

=== Australia ===
==== 2011 ====
In October 2011, Australia coach Tim Sheens named Cherry-Evans in the Kangaroos 2011 Four Nations squad.

In November 2011, Cherry-Evans made his Test debut for Australia coming off the bench against Wales and scoring a try at the Racecourse Ground in Wrexham, Australia winning 56–14.

==== 2012 ====
In April 2012, Cherry-Evans was selected for the 2012 Anzac Test in Auckland. Cherry-Evans didn't receive any game time, in a move that coach Tim Sheens was criticized for, by retired Kangaroo Chris Close who labelled the decision "disrespectful".

==== 2013 ====
In October 2013, Cherry-Evans was selected in the Kangaroos 24 man squad for the 2013 Rugby League World Cup squad. Cherry-Evans missed selection for the opening match against England but made his starting debut at international level, at halfback, against Fiji, scoring a try in a 34–2 win playing alongside five-eighth Johnathan Thurston. Cherry-Evans played five-eighth for the first time in his career with Cooper Cronk playing halfback, against Ireland in a 50-nil win with Cherry-Evans scoring another try. Cherry-Evans was selected on the bench for the Quarter-Final against Fiji in a 62-nil win against the USA, the Semi-Final against Fiji in a 64–0 win and in the 2013 Rugby League World Cup Final against New Zealand in a 34–2 win, played in front of an international record attendance of 74,468 at the Old Trafford stadium in Manchester.

==== 2014 ====
In April 2014, Cherry-Evans was selected in the Kangaroos 2014 Anzac Test squad in the No.14 jersey. Cherry-Evans only played 5 minutes in a 30–18 win over New Zealand at Sydney Football Stadium.

In October 2014, Cherry-Evans was selected in the Kangaroos 2014 Four Nations squad. Cherry-Evans started at five-eighth in all four matches, alongside halfback Cooper Cronk. Cherry-Evans scored a try and kicked his first two goals for Australia against Samoa.

==== 2015 ====
In April 2015, Cherry-Evans was selected as 18th man for the 2015 Anzac Test at Suncorp.

==== 2018 ====
In October 2018, Cherry-Evans was recalled to the Kangaroos squad, as first-choice halfback and vice-captain of the side to play New Zealand and Tonga. Australia lost 26–24 to New Zealand in Auckland. Australia beat Tonga 34–16, with Cherry-Evans scoring a try.

==== 2019 ====
In October 2019, Cherry-Evans was again named vice-captain of Australia to play New Zealand and Tonga in the 2019 Oceania Cup. Cherry-Evans received a late call-up to Australia's 9s squad for the 2019 Rugby League World Cup 9s, and was named co-captain of the side alongside Wade Graham. Australia beat New Zealand 24–10 to win the Final. In the Test matches, Australia won against New Zealand 26–4 in Wollongong but lost to Tonga 16–12 in Auckland. This was the first time Australia had lost to a Tier-2 nation since 1978.

==== 2022 ====
In October 2022, Cherry-Evans was named in Australia's squad for the 2022 Rugby League World Cup, after COVID-19 had stopped international rugby league since 2019. However he was not appointed vice-captain with Cameron Murray and Isaah Yeo given the vice-captaincy duties. He was named in the No.2 jersey for the tournament, in a criticized new jersey system based on when they made their international debut. Cherry-Evans started the tournament at halfback, against Fiji in a 42–8 win for Australia. Nathan Cleary took over at halfback against Scotland and retained the spot for the rest of the tournament. Cherry-Evans played five-eighth alongside Cleary against Italy in a 66–6 win. Cherry-Evans played off the bench against Lebanon in a 48–4 win. This was the first time Cherry-Evans had played off the bench since 2014.

==== 2023 ====
In October 2023, Cherry-Evans was named in Australia's squad for the 2023 Rugby League Pacific Championships. Following the withdrawal of Cleary, Cherry-Evans was back as Australia's halfback, winning 38–12 against Samoa and 36–18 against New Zealand. Australia were defeated 30-nil to New Zealand in the Final.

=== Queensland ===
==== 2011 ====
In January 2011, Cherry-Evans was included in a 14-man QAS Emerging Origin squad at the Queensland Sport & Athletics Centre (QSAC) in Brisbane.

==== 2012 ====
In May 2012, Queensland coach Mal Meninga selected Cherry-Evans as the 18th man for Game 1 of the 2012 State of Origin series but he didn't play a game during the series.

==== 2013 ====
In May 2013, Cherry-Evans was again selected as 18th man for Queensland in Game 1 of the 2013 State of Origin series.

In June 2013, Cherry-Evans was named to make his Origin debut for Queensland in Game 2 of the 2013 State of Origin series in the No.14 jersey. He made his State of Origin debut for Queensland in front of a home crowd at Suncorp Stadium, QLD winning 26–6.

In July 2013, Cherry-Evans was again named on the bench for Game 3, with QLD winning 12–10 in front of an ANZ Stadium record crowd of 83,813 fans and securing a record breaking eighth straight State of Origin series win.

==== 2014 ====
In May 2014, Cherry-Evans was named for his second Origin series, again in the No.14 jersey for Game 1 of the 2014 State of Origin series and the 100th Origin match. In Game 1, at Suncorp, halfback Cooper Cronk suffered a broken arm, leaving the field after 9 minutes, which saw Cherry-Evans come off the bench and play halfback for the first time at Origin level. QLD were leading 4-nil however lost to NSW 12–8.

In June 2014, Cherry-Evans was named in the QLD No.7 jersey for the first time, for Game 2, at ANZ Stadium. Cherry-Evans was under an injury cloud with a knee injury and passed a fitness test on game-day. QLD lost 6–4, which meant the end of the Maroons' 8-series winning streak.

In July 2014, Cherry-Evans was named on the bench for Game 3, at Suncorp, following the return of Cronk in the No.7 jersey. Cherry-Evans came on late in the first half and made a slicing run from 50m out before kicking back inside to captain Cameron Smith who scored a try to open the scoring in Game 3. QLD winning 32–8.

==== 2015 ====
In May 2015, Cherry-Evans suffered a shoulder injury in Round 10 of the NRL against the Penrith Panthers, the night before the Maroons would select their Game 1 team for the 2015 State of Origin series. The following morning he was selected in the Maroons No.14 jersey for Game 1. Following a medical, Cherry-Evans was ruled out for Game 1.

In June 2015, following a knee injury to Cronk, Cherry-Evans was named in the QLD No.7 jersey for Game 2, having returned from his shoulder injury for Manly. QLD lost 30–18 at the Melbourne Cricket Ground to New South Wales. Cherry-Evans was axed for Game 3, with Cronk returning from injury at halfback and Michael Morgan retaining the bench utility role.

==== 2018 ====
In July 2018, Cherry-Evans was named at halfback to make his origin return after a three-year absence at origin level for Game 3 of the 2018 State of Origin series. Cherry-Evans played a starring role, scoring his first Origin try, winning 18–12, ensuring QLD wouldn't lose the series 3-nil in the dead rubber at Suncorp Stadium. His great form in the game received widespread praise.

==== 2019 ====
In May 2019, Cherry-Evans was named as the 15th Captain of the Queensland Maroons. Queensland won the first game 18–14 under Cherry-Evans captaincy, at Suncorp Stadium however went on to lose the final two matches. In Game 3 Blues fullback James Tedesco scored a try in the 79th minute when scores were level 20-all. Cherry-Evans was in position to take a field goal attempt 35 meters out however a slow play the ball and a rushing NSW defensive line saw him change his mind and go for a normal field position kick. Cherry-Evans said "the shot that I didn't take will be the one I always regret".

==== 2020 ====
In November 2020, Cherry-Evans captained QLD to a famous series victory in the 2020 State of Origin series. His first series win as captain. Queensland defeating a highly fancied New South Wales side 2–1. Before the series had begun, NSW ex-players including former NSW captain Paul Gallen and NSW media outlets described the 2020 Queensland team as the worst ever Maroons side. Gallen said it was the worst Queensland team in 40 years. At the presentation ceremony following the conclusion of Game 3, Cherry-Evans said "On behalf of the worst ever Queensland team, thank you very much".

==== 2021 ====
In 2021, Queensland were defeated 50–6 in Townsville, 26-nil in Brisbane before winning the third game 20–18 on the Gold Coast, in the 2021 State of Origin series. Due to COVID-19, this was the first time an Origin series was played in a single state, and was the first time Townsville and the Gold Coast hosted Origin matches.

==== 2022 ====
In 2022, Cherry-Evans captained Queensland to his second series win as captain, in the 2022 State of Origin series. Queensland won 16–10 in Sydney, with Cherry-Evans scoring his second origin try and his first as captain. New South Wales responded heavily in Perth, defeating Queensland 44–12. Queensland won the decider 22–12 in Brisbane at Suncorp Stadium.

==== 2023 ====
In 2023, Cherry-Evans captained QLD to his third series win as captain, winning the series in the first two matches, 26–16 in Adelaide in Game 1, in which he received the Dick "Tosser" Turner Medal for 20 Origin games for QLD and 32–6 at Suncorp in Game 2. In Game 3, Cherry-Evans broke Allan Langer's record for most consecutive games in Origin as a halfback, in a 24–10 loss in Sydney.

==== 2024 ====
In 2024, Cherry-Evans won his second man of the match at Origin level, with 2 try assists and a 40/20, in Game 1 in Sydney defeating New South Wales 38–10. Queensland lost 38–18 in Melbourne at the MCG and lost the decider in Brisbane 14–4.

==== 2025 ====
In May 2025, Cherry-Evans was selected as the Maroons captain for a seventh straight series.

==== Captaincy records ====
Cherry-Evans captained Queensland on 18 occasions, for 9 wins and 10 losses for a 47.37% winning record. Under Cherry-Evans captaincy, QLD won 3 series and lost 3 series. QLD's biggest ever loss (50–6) came under Cherry-Evans captaincy and a further two heavy defeats of a margin of 32 also came under his captaincy.
