= Shin =

Shin may refer to:

== Biology ==
- The front part of the leg below the knee
- Shinbone, the tibia, the larger of the two bones in the leg below the knee in vertebrates

== Names ==
- Shin (given name) (Katakana: シン, Hiragana: しん), a Japanese given name
- Shin (Korean surname) (Hangul: 신, Hanja: 申, 辛, 愼), a Korean family name

== Fictional characters ==
- Shin Akuma, a character in the Street Fighter series
- Shin Asuka (disambiguation), multiple
- Shin Godzilla (character), a fictional monster from the film of the same name
- Shin Hati, a fictional character in Star Wars
- Shin Malphur, a character in the video game Destiny 2: Forsaken
- Kamen Rider Shin, a character in the Kamen Rider series
- Seijuro Shin (進), a character in the manga and anime series Eyeshield 21
- A character in the manga Dorohedoro
- A character in the manga and anime Fist of the North Star
- Shin Tsukimi from the video game Your Turn to Die -Death Game by Majority-
- Shin Chan from the Japanese TV Series by the same name

== Music ==
- Shin (band) (Chinese: 信樂團)
- Shin (singer) (蘇見信), a Taiwanese singer and former lead singer of the band Shin
- Shin, the drummer of the German visual kei group Cinema Bizarre
- The Shin, a Georgian fusion jazz band
- The Shins, an American indie band
- Shin (シン), a Japanese rock singer and former vocalist of Vivid

=== Albums ===
- Shin, the 2002 self-titled debut album of the band Shin
- Shin, the 2023 debut album of VTuber Tokoyami Towa

== Places ==
- Shin, Iran, a village in Zanjan Province, Iran
- Shin, Swat, an administrative unit in the Khyber Pakhtunkhwa province of Pakistan
- Shin, Syria, a village in Syria
- Loch Shin, a loch in the Scottish Highlands
- River Shin, a river in the Scottish Highlands

== Other uses ==
- Shin (letter), the twenty-first letter in many Semitic alphabets, including Hebrew ש and Arabic ش
- Shin Buddhism, a widely practiced branch of Buddhism in Japan, named after its founder, Shinran
- Shin Corporation, one of the largest conglomerates in Thailand
- Shina language
- Shina people, an ethnic group who live in parts of Pakistan and northern India
- Shin (信), a principle of Nichiren Buddhism
- Shin Japan Heroes Universe, a Japanese crossover media project

== See also ==
- Chin (disambiguation)
- Sheen (disambiguation)
- Shein (disambiguation)
- Shien (disambiguation)
- Shina (disambiguation)
- Shine (disambiguation)
- Şin, Azerbaijan
- 晉 (disambiguation)
