= Shins =

Shins may refer to:

- Shina people, an ethnic group of northern Pakistan and India
- The Shins, an American rock band

== See also ==
- Shin (disambiguation)
