= Sina =

Sina may refer to:

== Relating to China ==
- Chin (China), or Sina (Chinese: 支那, 震旦), old Chinese form of the Sanskrit name Cina (चीन)
  - Shina (word), or Sina (Japanese: 支那), archaic Japanese word for China
  - Sinae, Latin name for China

== Places ==
- Sina, Albania, or Sinë, a village in Dibër County, Albania
- Sina, Iran (Persian: سينا), a village in Isfahan Province, Iran
- Sena, Iran (سينا), also romanized as Sina, a village in Bushehr Province, Iran
- Sina Rural District, in East Azerbaijan Province, Iran
- Sina District, in San Antonio de Putina Province, Peru

== People ==
=== Given name ===
- Sina Ashouri (born 1988), Iranian soccer player
- Sina Dertwinkel (born 1988), German politician
- Sina-Drums, YouTube alias of Sina Doering (born 1999), German drummer and YouTuber
- Wynne (rapper), stage name of Sina Wynne Holwerda (born 1997), American rapper
- Sina Siegenthaler (born 2000), Swiss snowboarder

=== Surname ===
- Ali Sina (activist), pseudonym of an Iranian-born Canadian activist, founder of several anti-Islam and anti-Muslim websites
- Elvis Sina (born 1978), Albanian soccer player
- Ibn Sīnā (c. 980 – 1037), also known as Avicenna, Persian physician, philosopher, and scientist
- Jaren Sina (born 1994), Portugal-born American basketball player of Kosovar origin
- Melek Sina Baydur (born 1948), Turkish diplomat and former Ambassador of Turkey
- Than Sina, 21st-century Cambodian politician

== Companies ==
- Sina Corporation, Chinese online media company
- Sina Bank, a private Iranian bank

== Art ==
- Sina and the Eel, a Samoan myth of origin
- Society for Indecency to Naked Animals, a satirical hoax concocted by Alan Abel
- "Sina", a song by Brazilian singer Djavan
  - "Soulfood To Go (Sina)", English title of a cover of this song by The Manhattan Transfer

== Military and government ==
- Sina-class fast attack craft, class of Iranian naval craft
- Sina-1, an Iranian satellite launched on a Russian rocket in 2005
- Sina 7 (frigate), an Iranian frigate launched in 2012
- Sichere Inter-Netzwerk Architektur, a German government cryptography system

== See also ==
- Shina (disambiguation)
- Sinai (disambiguation)
- Sino (disambiguation)
  - Sino- prefix from Latin meaning China-
- Sena (disambiguation)
