= Sheena =

Sheena may refer to:

== People ==
- Ringo Sheena (born 1978), Japanese singer
- Shenna Bellows (born 1975), American politician
- Sheena Belarmino (born 2005), Filipino singer and dancer
- Sheena Catacutan (born 2004), Filipino dancer and singer, member of Filipino girl group Bini
- Sheena Easton (born 1959), Scottish actress and singer
- Sheena Halili (born 1987), Filipino actress
- Sheena Lawrick (born 1983), Canadian softball infielder
- Sheena Liam (born 1991), Malaysian model
- Sheena Lovia Boateng, Ghanaian academic
- Sheena McDonald (born 1954), Scottish journalist and broadcaster
- Sheena Melwani (born 1983), Canadian-American singer-songwriter and social media personality
- Sheena Sakai, contestant on America's Next Top Model
- Sheena Shahabadi (born 1986), Indian actress

== Characters ==
- Sheena, Queen of the Jungle, an American comic book character that first appeared in 1938
  - Sheena, Queen of the Jungle, a 1950s television series based on the comics character
  - Sheena (film), the 1984 film adaptation of the comics character
  - Sheena (TV series), a 2000-2002 TV series based on the above character
- Sheena Fujibayashi, a character in the role-playing game Tales of Symphonia
- Strider Sheena, a character from the Strider franchise

== See also ==
- Shina (disambiguation)
- Sheen (disambiguation)
- Shenna, a surname and given name
- Joanna
