= Shien =

Shien may refer to:

- Shien, a character in Fūma no Kojirō
- Shien, in the anime/manga Saiyuki
- Shien, in the video game Shien's Revenge (or Shien: The Blade Chaser)

== See also ==
- Chen Shien (born 1985), professional Go player
- Shien Biau Woo (born 1937), American professor and politician
- Shu Shien-Siu (1912–2001), Chinese/Taiwanese mathematician, engineer, and educator
- Wang Chien-shien (born 1938), founder of the Chinese New Party
- Shein (disambiguation)
- Shin (disambiguation)
- Shine (disambiguation)
