= Shein (disambiguation) =

Shein is a Chinese online fast fashion retailer.

Shein may also refer to:

== People with the surname ==
- Aleksei Shein (1662–1700), Russian commander
- Ali Mohamed Shein (born 1948), Tanzanian politician
- Arn Shein (1928–2007), American sports writer
- Kyaw Shein (born 1938), Burmese sports shooter at the 1964 Olympics
- Mikhail Shein (died 1634), Russian general
- Oleg Shein (born 1972), Russian politician, member of the State Duma
- Valery Shein (born 1945), Soviet alpine skier at the 1964 Olympics
- Win Shein (born 1957), Burmese military officer and Minister for Finance

== See also ==
- Battle of Deir el Shein, WW2, Egypt
- Bei Mir Bistu Shein, Yiddish song
- Shien (disambiguation)
- Shine (disambiguation)
- Shin (disambiguation)
