= Shina =

Shina may refer to:

- Kohistani Shina language, an Indo-Aryan language spoken in Khyber-Pakhtunkhwa, Pakistan
- Shina language, an Indo-Aryan language spoken in Gilgit-Baltistan, Pakistan
- Shina people, an ethnic group in Gilgit Baltistan, Pakistan

== People named Shina ==
- Shina Matsudo (born 1973), Japanese freestyle swimmer
- Shina Peters (born 1958), Nigerian Jùjú musician
- Shina Pellar (born 1976), Nigerian entrepreneur
- Shina Rambo (born 1960s), Nigerian bandit
- Takeshi Shina (born 1966), Japanese politician
- Yakir Shina (born 1985), Israeli footballer

== Others ==
- Shina (word), originally a Japanese term for China, now archaic and considered an ethnic slur
- Shina (Bloody Roar), Shina Gado, a character from the Bloody Roar video game series
- Shina, Kabul, Afghanistan
- S'hina, or Cholent, traditional Jewish stew
- Shina wood, a kind of plywood commonly used in printing

== See also ==
- Shiina, a Japanese surname
- Shin (disambiguation)
- Sina (disambiguation)
- Sheena (disambiguation)
