= Joe Regent =

Australian rugby league footballer

Personal information
- Full name: Joseph Regent
- Born: 1878 Rozelle, New South Wales, Australia
- Died: 3 August 1945 (aged 66–67) Liverpool, New South Wales, Australia

Playing information

Rugby union
Club
Years	Team	Pld	T	G	FG	P
19??–07	Balmain RFC

Rugby league
- Position: Fullback, Five-eighth, Hooker
Club
Years	Team	Pld	T	G	FG	P
1908–09	Balmain	20	7	6	0	33
Representative
Years	Team	Pld	T	G	FG	P
1909	New South Wales	2	0	0	0	0
- Source: As of 15 February 2019
- Relatives: Bob Sheens (great nephew); Tim Sheens (great nephew)

Joe Regent (1878–1945) was an Australian rugby league footballer who played in the 1900s. He played for Balmain and was a foundation player of the club.

== Background ==
Regent was born in Rozelle, New South Wales and was the son of French immigrants. Regent played Rugby Union with Balmain RFC before switching codes to join Balmain.

== Playing career ==
Regent made his first grade debut for Balmain against Western Suburbs on 20 April 1908 at Birchgrove Oval, which was the club's first ever game and also the opening week of the inaugural NSWRL competition. Balmain went on to win the match 24–0 in front of 3000 spectators with Regent playing at Fullback.

Regent played with Balmain up until the end of the 1909 before retiring. Regent played representative football for New South Wales in 1909 appearing in 2 games.
