= Scheen =

Scheen is a surname. Notable people with the surname include:

- Céline Scheen (born 1976), Belgian soprano
- Christopher Winther Scheen (1809–1850), Norwegian clergyman
- Kjersti Scheen (1943–2026), Norwegian journalist, writer and illustrator

== See also ==
- Sheen (surname)
