= Craig Frawley =

Australian rugby league footballer

Personal information
- Born: 19 August 1980 (age 44); Brisbane, Queensland, Australia

Playing information
- Height: 188 cm (6 ft 2 in)
- Weight: 98 kg (15 st 6 lb)
- Position: Wing
Club
Years	Team	Pld	T	G	FG	P
2003–04	Brisbane Broncos	28	13	0	0	52
2005–06	Canberra Raiders	23	3	0	0	12
2007	Brisbane Broncos	9	2	0	0	8
	Total	60	18	0	0	72

Craig Frawley (born 19 August 1980) is an Australian former professional rugby league footballer who played in the 2000s. He played in the National Rugby League for the Brisbane Broncos and the Canberra Raiders, usually as a wing or centre.

== Background ==
While attending Southern Cross Catholic, Frawley played for the Australian Schoolboys team in 1997.

== Playing career ==
Frawley made his first grade debut for Brisbane against the Sydney Roosters in round 6 of the 2003 NRL season at the Sydney Football Stadium. He played in the club's qualifying final defeat against Penrith in the same year.

In the 2004 NRL season, he played 15 games and scored 10 tries for Brisbane. He was then released by the club and joined the Canberra Raiders.

Frawley's time at Canberra was marred by several minor injuries, and he was eventually released by the club in April 2007.

After being re-signed by the Brisbane Broncos and playing with their Queensland Cup feeder side Aspley, Frawley was called up to the first grade team after an injury to Brent Tate. He had a strong opening to the season, but due to a hamstring injury was unable to continue to compete at NRL level. His final game for Brisbane was their round 23 loss against Canterbury-Bankstown at Suncorp Stadium during the 2007 NRL season.
