= Shin Asuka =

Shin Asuka may refer to:

- Shin Asuka, a character in Ultraman Dyna
- Shinn Asuka, a character in Mobile Suit Gundam SEED Destiny
