= Sheene =

Sheene is a surname. Notable people with this surname include:

- Alice Sheene (fl. early 18th century), English silversmith
- Barry Sheene (1950–2003), British motorcycle racer
