= Sina Dertwinkel =

German politician (born 1988)

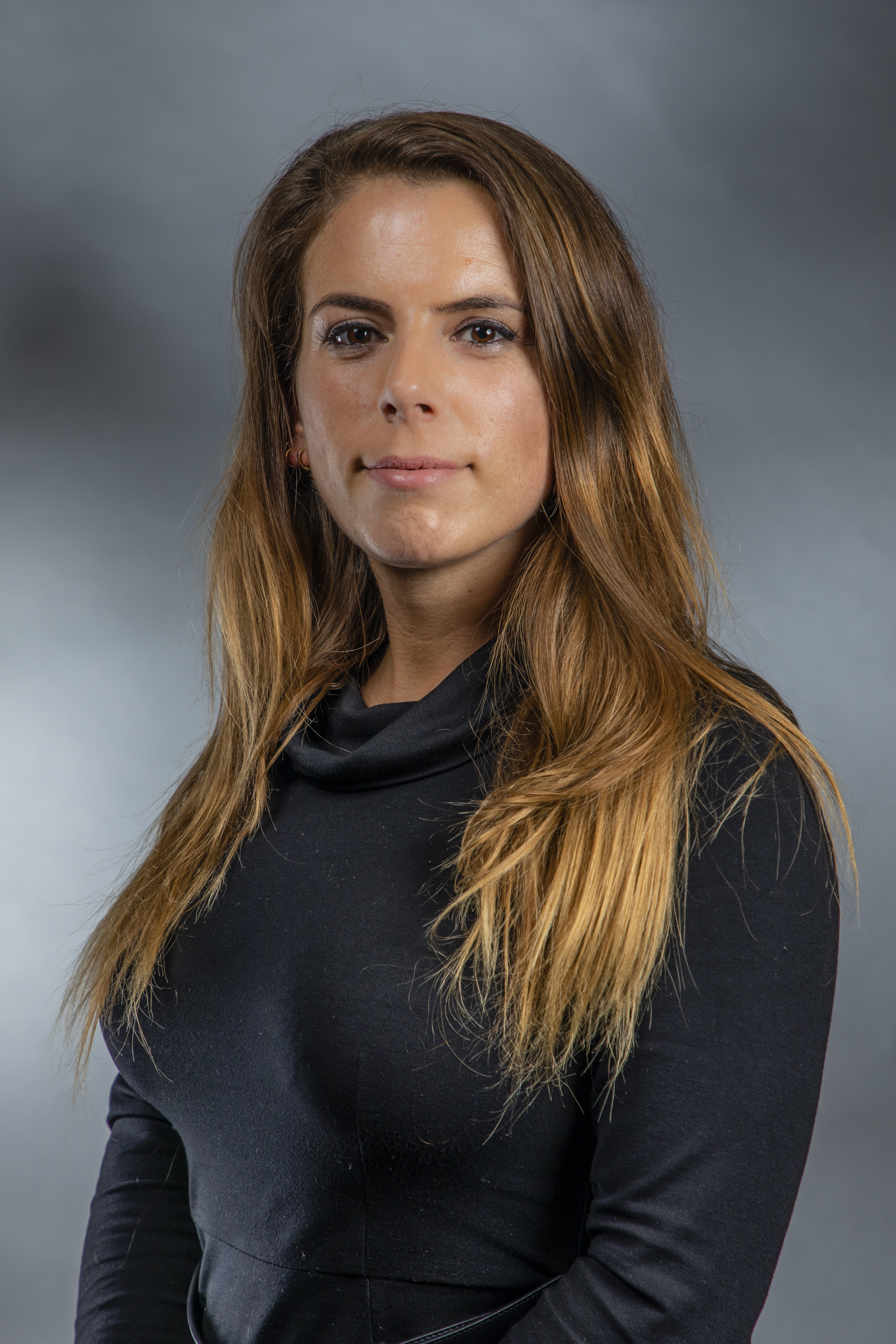
- Dertwinkel in 2019

Member of the Bürgerschaft of Bremen
- Incumbent
- Assumed office 7 January 2016
- Preceded by: Paul Bödeker

Personal details
- Born: 21 May 1988 (age 38)
- Party: Christian Democratic Union

Sina Dertwinkel (born 21 May 1988) is a German politician serving as a member of the Bürgerschaft of Bremen since 2016. Until 2024, she served as chairwoman of the Young Union in Bremerhaven.
