= Bob Sheens =

Australian rugby league footballer

Personal information
- Born: 12 August 1953 (age 72) Lidcombe, New South Wales, Australia

Playing information
- Position: Second-row, Lock
Club
Years	Team	Pld	T	G	FG	P
1979–81	Eastern Suburbs	10	0	0	0	0
- Relatives: Tim Sheens (brother); Joe Regent (great uncle)

Bob Sheens is an Australian former rugby league footballer. Bob is the brother of Tim Sheens.

Bob Sheens played 10 1st grade matches during his career, all matches were for the Eastern Suburbs club in 1979 and 1981.

Bob Sheens worked as a physical education (PE) teacher at Belmore Boys High School in the 1970s, Randwick Boys High School (RBHS) in the early to mid 1980s. He is the brother of former professional rugby league footballer and coach Tim Sheens.

Sheen worked under his brother as strength coach at the North Queensland Cowboys.

Sheens worked as a conditioner at Eastern Suburbs and Cronulla Sutherland and later was a lower grade coach at the Western Reds.

Bob Sheens currently works as a physical education (PE) teacher and a former passionate B Grade Coach at Marcellin College Randwick (MCR).
