= Matthew Bell (rugby league) =

Australian rugby league footballer

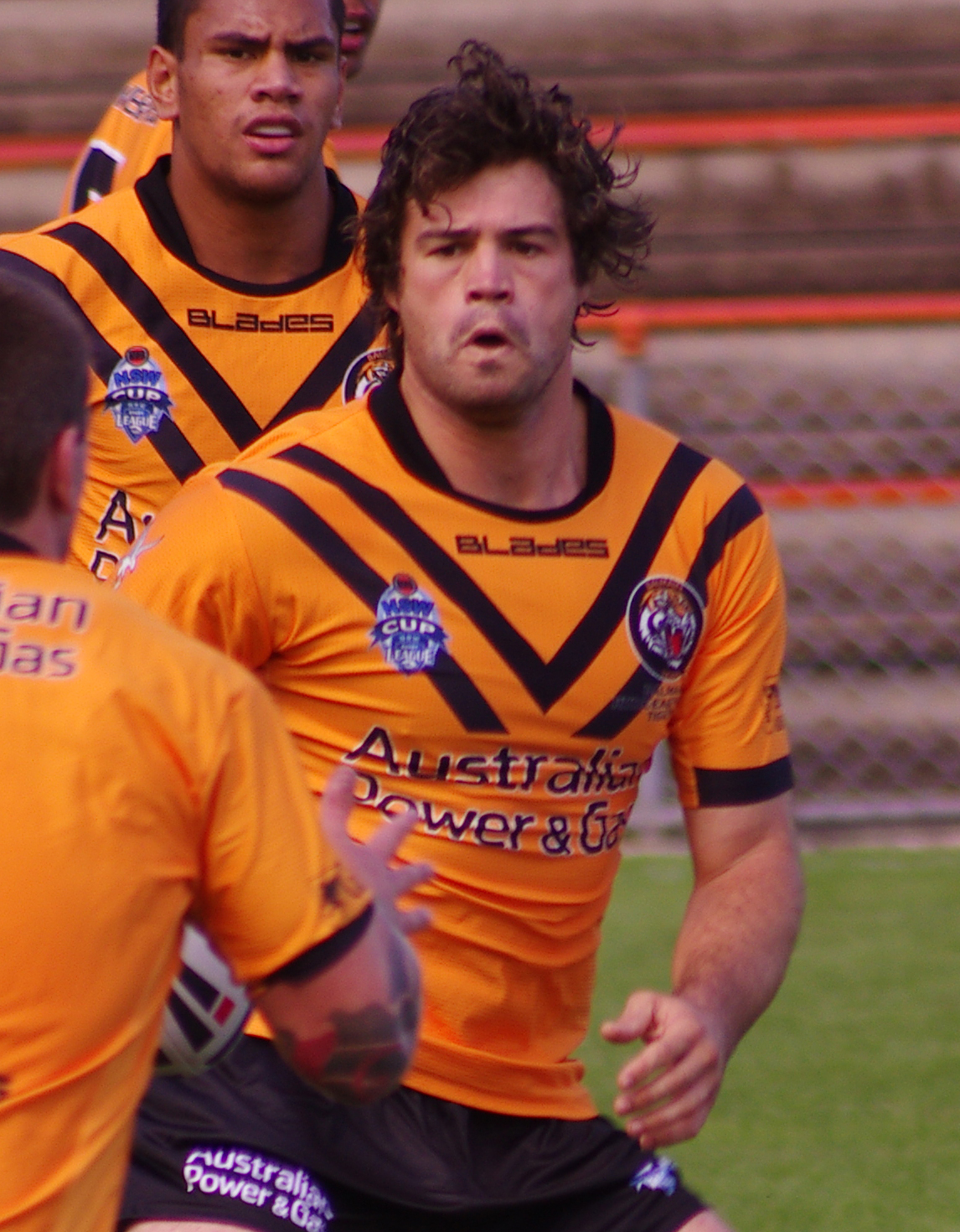

Personal information
- Full name: Matthew Bell
- Born: 30 August 1981 (age 45) Brisbane, Queensland, Australia
- Height: 190 cm (6 ft 3 in)
- Weight: 107 kg (16 st 12 lb)

Playing information
- Position: Second-row, Lock, Prop
Club
Years	Team	Pld	T	G	FG	P
2006–11	Penrith Panthers	110	1	0	0	4
2012–13	Wests Tigers	32	0	0	0	0
	Total	142	1	0	0	4
- Source: As of 31 January 2019

Matthew Bell (born 30 August 1981 in Brisbane, Queensland, Australia) is an Australian former professional rugby league footballer who played in the 2000s and 2010s. Bell primarily played in the second row, but most of his appearances were started from the bench.

== Playing career ==
Bell played his junior football for Brothers St. Brendan's JRLFC and previously played for Souths Logan Magpies in the Queensland Cup. He made his NRL debut in round 11 of the 2006 season against the Parramatta Eels at CUA Stadium. In the 2007 NRL season, Bell played ten games as Penrith finished last on the table and claimed the wooden spoon.

Having played over a hundred games in his six years with the Penrith club, Bell signed a one-year contract to join the Wests Tigers in 2012.

Bell, played in 23 games in 2012. He mostly played from the bench, but made appearances in the starting team when Chris Heighington was injured and Adam Blair was suspended.

In 2013, Bell played the first six games of the season, before suffering a right hand tendon injury at a training session, returning to first-grade near the end of the season.

For the 2014 season, Bell signed to play with the Burleigh Bears in the Queensland Cup competition.
