= Sheen (surname) =

Sheen is a surname. Notable people with the surname include:

- Barry Sheen (1918–2005), British judge
- Bobby Sheen (1941–2000), American singer
- Caroline Sheen (born 1976), Welsh actress
- Charlie Sheen (born 1965), American actor, son of Martin
- Daniel R. Sheen (1852-1926), American politician and lawyer
- Derek Sheen, American stand-up comedian
- Edna Sheen (1944–2012), American make-up artist
- Fulton J. Sheen (1895–1979), American Catholic archbishop, television evangelist
- Gillian Sheen (1928–2021), British fencer
- Graham Sheen (born 1952), British bassoonist
- Grant Sheen (born 1974), English cricketer
- Jack Sheen (1937–2020), American plastic surgeon
- Jacqueline Sheen (born 1963), American model
- Janet Sheen (born 1944), American actress and producer
- Martin Sheen (originally Estévez, born 1940), American actor
- Michael Sheen (born 1969), Welsh actor
- Mickey Sheen (1927–1987), American jazz drummer
- Ruth Sheen (born 1952), English actress

Fictional characters:

- Emma Sheen, a character in the anime series Mobile Suit Zeta Gundam

== See also ==
- Scheen, people with this surname
