= Matt Ballin =

Australian rugby league footballer

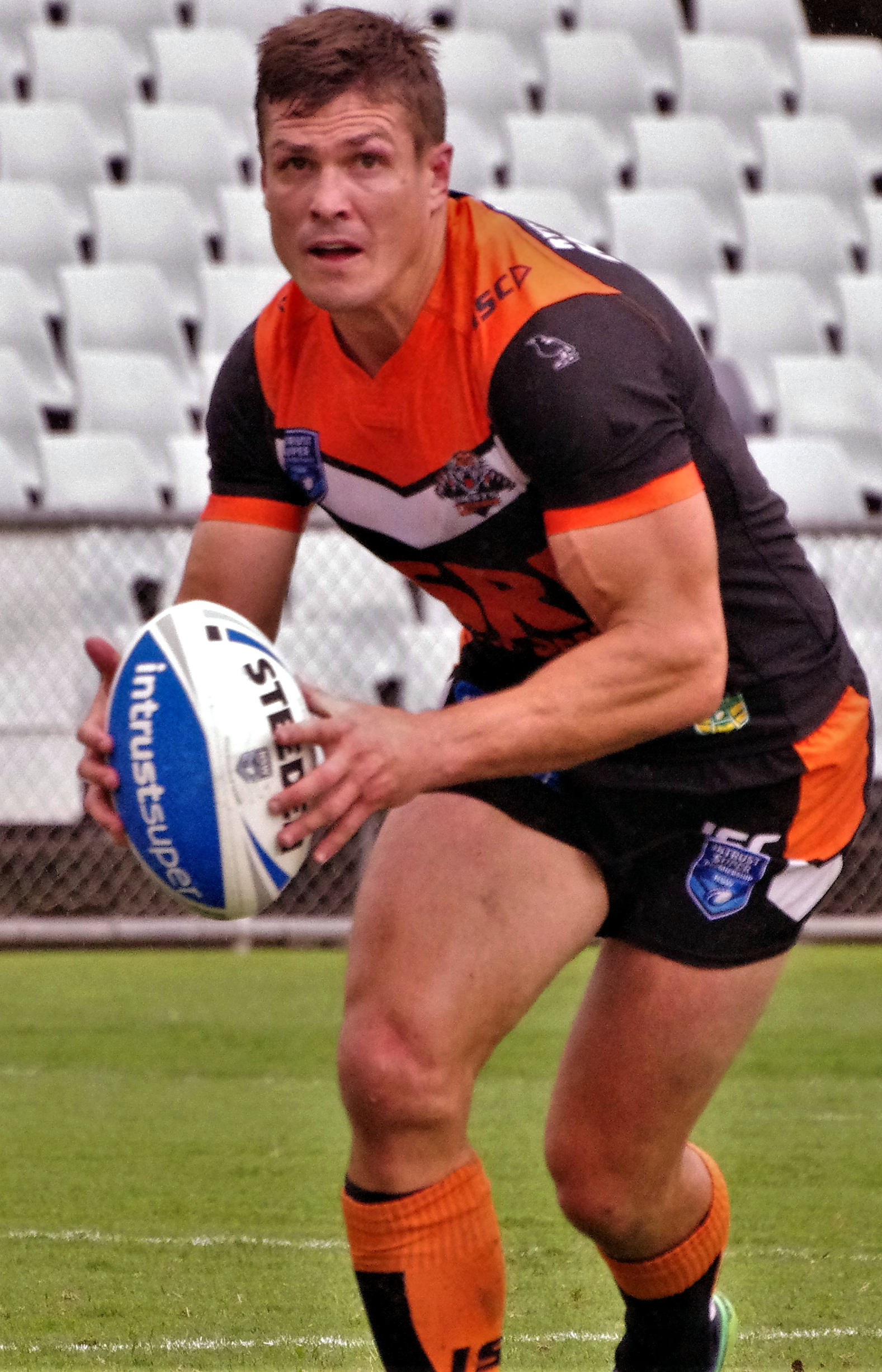

Personal information
- Full name: Matthew Ballin
- Born: 5 January 1984 (age 42) Nanango, Queensland, Australia

Playing information
- Height: 179 cm (5 ft 10 in)
- Weight: 88 kg (13 st 12 lb)
- Position: Hooker
Club
Years	Team	Pld	T	G	FG	P
2007–15	Manly Sea Eagles	217	22	0	0	88
2016–17	Wests Tigers	3	0	0	0	0
	Total	220	22	0	0	88
Representative
Years	Team	Pld	T	G	FG	P
2010	Queensland	1	0	0	0	0

Matthew Ballin (born 5 January 1984) is an Australian former professional rugby league footballer who last played for the Wests Tigers in the National Rugby League (NRL) and also the Manly Warringah Sea Eagles. Ballin is currently an assistant coach for the Brisbane Broncos with whom he won the 2025 NRL Grand Final, under head coach Michael Maguire he works with the back 5. Ballin is also the assistant coach for the Queensland Maroons. He has played one game for Queensland in State of Origin. He played at hooker and previously played for the Manly Warringah Sea Eagles, with whom he won the 2008 and 2011 Premierships.

== Playing career ==
=== 2005-2014 ===
Ballin signed with Sydney based club Manly-Warringah and made his NRL debut in Round 2 of the 2007 NRL season when the Sea Eagles defeated the Wests Tigers 19–8 at Leichhardt Oval, scoring a try in his first grade debut.

Ballin played in Manly's record breaking 40–0 victory over the Melbourne Storm in the 2008 NRL Grand Final where he was the game's first try scorer.

Ballin played in the 2011 NRL Grand Final giving Ballin his second NRL premiership as a player.

Coming off contract at the end of season 2012, rumours were rampant that Ballin would be a casualty of Manly's post-premiership(s) salary cap pressures, with the Canberra Raiders the front runners to secure his signature.

Ballin played every game for Manly in 2012 and finished the season as the league's leading tackler.

=== 2015 ===
In mid-2015, Ballin signed a two-year extension of his contract that would see him remain at Manly until the end of 2017. However, just a couple of months later he was one of 14 players who were reportedly told that he would not be required at the club beyond 2015. Additionally, Manly had signed South Sydney's 2014 premiership hooker Api Koroisau from Penrith as well as Brisbane Broncos hooker Matt Parcell. Ballin vowed to stay where he was and fight for his spot, even going so far as to say that he was prepared to play in Manly's New South Wales Cup team if it meant staying with the club. However, in Manly's shock 20–16 home loss to Parramatta in Round 24 of the 2015 season, Ballin suffered his second season-ending injury in consecutive years when he tore the anterior cruciate ligament (ACL) in his left knee. On 3 November, despite earlier stating he would fight for his spot at the Sea Eagles, Ballin signed a 2-year contract with the Wests Tigers starting in 2016.

=== 2016 ===
Returning from injury, Ballin did not make his debut for Wests Tigers until round 11. Soon after he suffered another season-ending ACL knee injury. "I played two NRL games and once in reserve grade – and I felt I contributed in those games – but obviously it wasn't enough footy. I want to be a bigger part of the team this year and play a lot more games. It's been an empty feeling sitting on the sidelines and not being able to help my teammates. When these things happen I suppose you learn to help them in different ways," he said.

=== 2017 ===
Ballin made only one appearance for the Wests Tigers during the 2017 season. On 26 June 2017, Ballin announced his immediate retirement from the NRL due to chronic injuries.

== Representative career ==
In April 2009, he was named in the preliminary 25-man squad to represent Queensland in the opening State of Origin match for 2009. However he did not make an appearance.

In 2010, with injury to Melbourne's Cameron Smith, Ballin was named in the Queensland side and played in Game 1 of the series at the ANZ Stadium in Sydney, won 28-24 by the Maroons. With Smith returning from injury, Ballin wasn't considered for the rest of the series, though he was on standby for the team should Smith's injury re-occur.

== Post-playing ==
In 2019 Ballin returned to the Manly Warringah Sea Eagles as part of the NRL team's education and wellbeing department, he also served as the U20s coach and coach of the NSW Cup Blacktown Workers. In 2021, Ballin had joined the Brisbane Broncos as part of the development squad. In 2024, Ballin joined the coaching staff of the Queensland Maroons after Cameron Smith stepped down as assistant coach.

In September 2025, Ballin extended his contract with the Broncos.

== Statistics ==
Year	Team	Games	Tries	Pts
2007	Manly Warringah Sea Eagles	13	2	8
2008	Manly Warringah Sea Eagles	27	5	20
2009	Manly Warringah Sea Eagles	25	3	12
2010	Manly Warringah Sea Eagles	25	3	12
2011	Manly Warringah Sea Eagles	27	3	12
2012	Manly Warringah Sea Eagles	27	2	8
2013	Manly Warringah Sea Eagles	28	3	12
2014	Manly Warringah Sea Eagles	23		
2015	Manly Warringah Sea Eagles	22	1	4
2016	Wests Tigers	2		
2017	Wests Tigers	1		
	Totals	220	22	88

== Personal life ==
Ballin also works as a personal fitness trainer specialising in fitness and weight loss.

Ballin is an Australian Apprenticeships Ambassador for the Australian Government.

Ballin married Seven News sports presenter Alissa Smith on 19 October 2024. In June 2025, the couple announced they were expecting a child.
