= Tim Sheens =

Australian professional rugby league coach (born 1950)

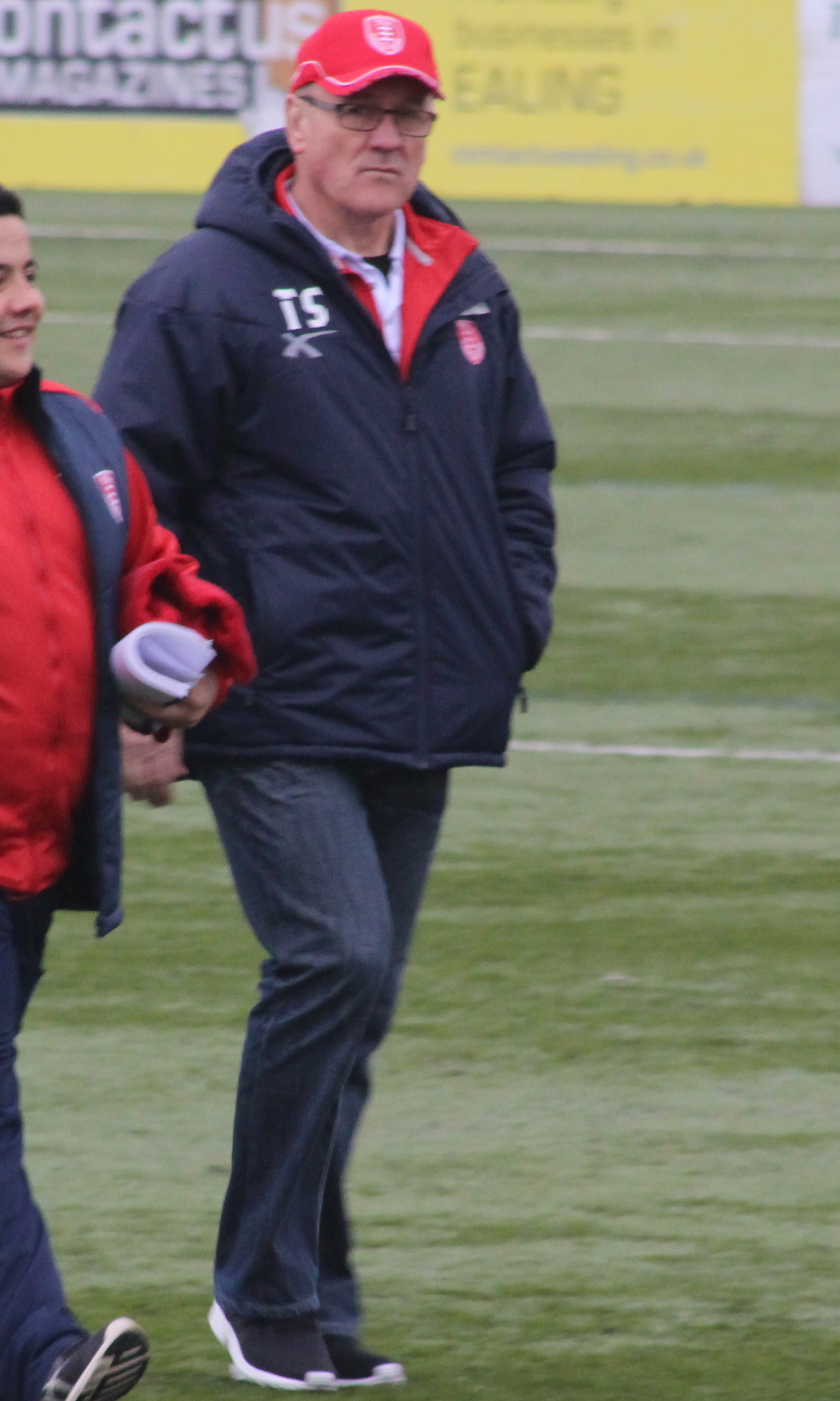

Personal information
- Full name: Timothy George Sheens
- Born: 30 October 1950 (age 76) Lidcombe, New South Wales, Australia

Playing information
- Height: 179 cm (5 ft 10 in)
- Weight: 99 kg (15 st 8 lb)
- Position: Prop
Club
Years	Team	Pld	T	G	FG	P
1970–82	Penrith Panthers	166	11	0	0	33

Coaching information
Club
Years	Team	Gms	W	D	L	W%
1984–87	Penrith Panthers	98	43	4	51	44
1988–96	Canberra Raiders	219	148	3	68	68
1997–01	North Qld Cowboys	103	27	4	72	26
2003–12	Wests Tigers	249	122	0	127	49
2017–19	Hull Kingston Rovers	78	44	2	32	56
2020	Widnes Vikings	7	5	0	2	71
2023	Wests Tigers	24	4	0	20	17
	Total	778	393	13	372	51
Representative
Years	Team	Gms	W	D	L	W%
1991	NSW City	1	0	0	1	0
1991	New South Wales	3	1	0	2	33
2006–08	NSW City	3	2	1	0	67
2009–15	Australia	31	26	1	4	84
2014	Prime Minister's XIII	1	1	0	0	100
2021	Combined Nations	1	1	0	0	100
- Education: St Gregory's College, Campbelltown
- Relatives: Bob Sheens (brother); Joe Regent (great uncle)

Timothy Sheens (born 30 October 1950) is an Australian professional rugby league football coach and former player. Head Coach of the Australia national team between 2009 and 2015, he has also been the head coach of National Rugby League (NRL) clubs, the Penrith Panthers, the Canberra Raiders, the North Queensland Cowboys and the Wests Tigers. As a player, Sheens was a prop forward with Sydney's Penrith club in the 1970s and 1980s before he retired and became their coach.

He then coached the Raiders, taking them to victory in the 1989, 1990 and 1994 premierships. With the Tigers he won the 2005 premiership. Sheens also set a new record for most games in Australian rugby league premiership history (which has since been broken by Wayne Bennett) and also coached the New South Wales Blues for the 1991 State of Origin series. In June 2015 he accepted a role with Super League club the Salford Red Devils to become Director of Rugby leading to his eventual resignation as the coach of the Australian National Team in October later that year. In September 2016 it was announced that he would join then Super League club Hull Kingston Rovers and he formally stepped down from his role at Salford Red Devils as they confronted Hull Kingston Rovers in the £1M Game relegation decider. Salford Red Devils won the game but Sheens confirmed his decision to coach Hull Kingston Rovers in 2017, in the Championship.

It was announced that Sheens would return to the Wests Tigers in 2021 working in pathways, development, and talent identification. Sheens was later announced as the club's coach for the 2023 and 2024 seasons, but he stepped down from the coaching role at the end of 2023.

== Playing career ==
Born to a well known rugby league family of the Penrith area, Tim Sheens was educated at St Dominic's College in Penrith but spent his last two years of school at St Gregory's College, Campbelltown, where he was the school captain and First XIII captain in 1968.

Sheens had a lengthy playing stint with Penrith Panthers, playing 166 first grade games from 1970 to 1982 and scoring 11 tries. Starting his career as a backrower, he finished as a ball-playing prop. In 1974 he was named as the Penrith Panthers' Player of the Year, but had his jaw broken in the inaugural Amco Cup final against Western Division.

By 1982, Sheens had played a club record 258 games in all grades, but was unable to come to terms with the club for another season. With 166 first grade appearances, Sheens was the most capped Penrith Panthers player until Royce Simmons surpassed him in the 1989 season. Sheens was soon coaxed out of retirement though, playing one season with the Campbelltown City Kangaroos in 1983, captaining that club to the Group 6 Rugby League premiership that season.

In October 2006, in recognition of his contribution as a player, Sheens was named as one of the Penrith Panthers "Team of Legends".

Tim Sheens' brother, Bob, was also a first grade NSWRFL player for Eastern Suburbs.

== Coaching career ==
=== Penrith Panthers ===
Although his first ever game as first-grade coach was a 24–12 loss to St. George, Sheens had a track-record of reforming under-performing teams to premiership victory. He brought Penrith to their first finals series ever in 1985, before departing the club at the end of the 1987 season.

=== Canberra Raiders ===
Sheens coached the Canberra Raiders to their first premiership in 1989. In the post season he travelled with the Canberra side to England for the 1989 World Club Challenge which was lost to Widnes. He won further premierships with Canberra in 1990 and 1994.

=== North Queensland Cowboys ===
However, his time with the North Queensland Cowboys (1997–2001) was less successful with the club earning two Wooden Spoons and, after board discussions, a period of stress-leave and while News Limited launched a take-over of the club, he resigned from North Queensland on 25 May 2001.

=== Wests Tigers ===
In 2002, Sheens accepted the coaching position with the Wests Tigers for the 2003 season, replacing Terry Lamb. The feat of the Wests Tigers winning the 2005 Grand Final against the Cowboys has been largely attributed to Sheens.

Sheens has coached four premiership winning teams, making him second only to Wayne Bennett among current coaches. Sheens was awarded the Dally M Coach of the Year in 1984, 1990 and 2005.

As NRL Premiers Wests travelled to England to play against Super League champions Bradford Bulls in the 2006 World Club Challenge. Sheens oversaw the Tigers' 30–10 loss.

In December 2007, Sheens' contract with the Tigers – due to expire at the end of the 2008 season – was extended to 2010.

On 3 May 2010, Sheens became the first coach in Australian rugby league history to reach 600 games. In 2011, Penrith Panthers offered Sheens the job as head coach for the club. However, on 29 April 2011, he decided to stay coach for the Wests Tigers and extended his coaching contract for until 2014. On 25 September 2012, after days of speculation about Sheen's future due to a poor recent season, the Wests Tigers announced Sheens would not coach the team in the 2013 season, but offered him other roles at the club.

=== Salford Red Devils ===
On 23 June 2015, Sheens become director of rugby league at the English rugby league club Salford Red Devils.

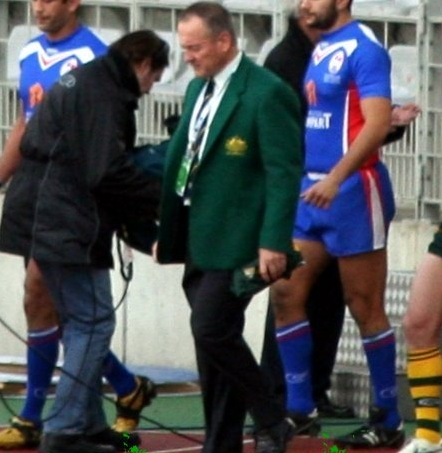
Sheens as coach of the Australian national side in 2009

=== Hull Kingston Rovers ===
In September 2016, it was announced that he would join Hull Kingston Rovers for season 2017 and beyond. In Sheens first year at the club, he coached Hull Kingston Rovers in their promotion back to Super League campaign of 2017. After two years at Hull KR, Sheens was sacked due to poor league position, form and loss of 'the dressing room' (implying player support) on 5 June 2019.

=== Widnes Vikings ===
On 13 October 2020, it was announced that Sheens had resigned as club head coach due to a falling out with management over staffing

=== Return to Wests Tigers ===
It was announced that Sheens would return to the Wests Tigers in 2021 working in pathways, development, and talent identification. Sheens was later announced as the club's coach for the 2023 and 2024 seasons, with a succession plan in place colloquially known as the "Marshall Plan" (after the US foreign aid program of the 1940s) to allow 2005 premiership hero Benji Marshall to take over as head coach in 2025. Sheens second coming as Wests Tigers head coach got off to bad start with the club losing their opening five matches. Following the clubs 46-12 loss against Brisbane in round 5, Sheens said "I hope we'll win the bye anyway in a couple of weeks".

In round 9 of the 2023 NRL season, Sheens guided the club to their first win in 273 days as they defeated back to back premiers Penrith 12-8. In round 18 the Wests Tigers led by Sheens travelled to the Queensland Country Bank Stadium in Townsville where they were beaten by the biggest margin in NRL history falling to North Queensland 74-0 with Sheens stating after the loss “It is just one of those games. There is nothing you can say. When you get beat like that there is nothing much you can say.”

On 16 August 2023, the Wests Tigers released a statement detailing how Sheens had requested to stand down as head coach at the end of the season, with Benji Marshall to take over head coaching duties from 2024 rather than 2025 as originally planned. Tigers chairman Lee Hagipantelis claimed in an interview with Fox Sports that the decision to fast-track Marshall to the head coaching role had been considered for some time due to him exceeding expectations in his role as Sheens' assistant coach. Sheens was expected to remain with the Tigers in a performance/mentoring role for the remainder of his contract.

== Representative coaching ==
At the representative level, Sheens coached the 1991 ARL City Origin team to a 22–12 win over Country. In the same year, as coach of the NSW State of Origin team, he led the side to a 2–1 series loss to Queensland. In 1997 Sheens coached the NSW super league side to a 23 to 22 win over Queensland in a Tri series competition involving NSW Queensland and New Zealand.

Sheens returned to the NRL representative arena in 2006 when he succeeded Graham Murray as coach for City Origin, a post he retained in 2007 and 2008. In 2006, City lost to Country, 12 points to 10 but won in 2007, 12 points to 6. The 2008 match was a 22–22 draw, with City retaining the trophy.

In February 2009, Sheens was appointed coach of the Australian national rugby league team following the resignation of Ricky Stuart. Sheens coached the Kangaroos to their first win in his charge, defeating the Kiwis on 8 May 2009.

He coached the Kangaroos in their successful 2013 Rugby League World Cup campaign. The Aussies conceded just four tries in the entire tournament (all to England in their opening match). He gave Australia revenge against New Zealand in the final after losing to them in the 2008 Final.

Sheens resigned as the Kangaroos head coach on 3 October 2015, to take up a full-time position as director of Super League club Salford Red Devils.

=== Combined Nations ===
On 25 June 2021 he coached the Combined Nations All Stars in their 26-24 victory over England, staged at the Halliwell Jones Stadium, Warrington, as part of England’s 2021 Rugby League World Cup preparation.

=== Coaching record ===
Tim Sheens – Coaching Results by Season
Team	Year	Games	Wins	Losses	Draws	Win %	Finals Series
Penrith	1984	24	12	11	1	50%	
Penrith	1985	26	14	11	1	53.85%	Semi-final: Parramatta 38–Penrith 6
Penrith	1986	24	11	12	1	45.83%	
Penrith	1987	24	6	17	1	25%	
Canberra	1988	24	15	9	0	62.5%	Minor Semi Final: Balmain 14–Canberra 6
Canberra	1989	26	18	8	0	69.23%	Grand Final: Canberra 19–Balmain 14
Canberra	1990	25	18	6	1	72%	Grand Final: Canberra 18–Penrith 14
Canberra	1991	26	17	9	0	65.38%	Grand Final: Penrith 19–Canberra 12
Canberra	1992	22	10	12	0	45.45%	
Canberra	1993	24	16	7	1	66.67%	Minor Semi Final: Brisbane 30–Canberra 12
Canberra	1994	26	20	6	0	76.92%	Grand Final: Canberra 36–Canterbury 12
Canberra	1995	24	21	3	0	87.5%	Preliminary Final 1: Canterbury 25–Canberra 6
Canberra	1996	22	13	8	1	59.09%	Quarter Final 3: St George 16–Canberra 14
North Queensland	1997	18	5	11	2	27.78%	
North Queensland	1998	24	9	15	0	37.5%	
North Queensland	1999	24	4	19	1	16.67%	
North Queensland	2000	26	7	19	0	26.92%	
North Queensland	2001	11	2	8	1	18.18%	
Wests Tigers	2003	24	7	17	0	29.17%	
Wests Tigers	2004	24	10	14	0	41.67%	
Wests Tigers	2005	28	18	10	0	64.29%	Grand Final: Wests Tigers 30–North Queensland 16
Wests Tigers	2006	24	10	14	0	41.67%	
Wests Tigers	2007	24	11	13	0	45.83%	
Wests Tigers	2008	24	11	13	0	45.83%	
Wests Tigers	2009	24	12	12	0	50%	
Wests Tigers	2010	27	16	11	0	59.26%	Preliminary Final: St George Illawarra 13–Wests Tigers 12
Wests Tigers	2011	26	16	10	0	61.54%	Semi Final: New Zealand Warriors 22–Wests Tigers 20
Wests Tigers	2012	24	11	13	0	45.83%	
Career		669	340	318	11	50.82%	at 1 September 2012

=== Representative record ===
Four Nations record
Year	Round	Position	GP	W	L	D
England/France 2009	Champions	1/4	4	3	0	1
Australia/New Zealand 2010	Second Place	2/4	4	3	1	0
England/Wales 2011	Champions	1/4	4	4	0	0
Australia/New Zealand 2014	Second Place	2/4	4	2	2	0
Total	2 Titles	4/4	16	12	3	1

World Cup record
Year	Round	Position	GP	W	L	D
England/Wales 2013	Champions	1/14	6	6	0	0
Total	1 Title	1/1	6	6	0	0

Anzac Test
Year	Round	Position	GP	W	L	D
2009 Anzac Test	Winners	1/2	1	1	0	0
2010 Anzac Test	Winners	1/2	1	1	0	0
2011 Anzac Test	Winners	1/2	1	1	0	0
2012 Anzac Test	Winners	1/2	1	1	0	0
2013 Anzac Test	Winners	1/2	1	1	0	0
2014 Anzac Test	Winners	1/2	1	1	0	0
2015 Anzac Test	Runners up	2/2	1	0	1	0
Total	6 Titles	6/7	7	6	1	0

Other Test matches
Year	Round	Position	GP	W	L	D
2011	Winners	1/2	1	1	0	0
2012	Winners	1/2	1	1	0	0
Total	2 Wins	2/2	2	2	0	0

=== Overall (Representative) Record ===
	Coached	Won	Lost	Drawn	% Won
Total	31	26	4	1	83.87%

As of 4 May 2015
