= List of Australia national rugby league team results =

Match results of the Australia national rugby league team have been recorded since it first started playing internationals in 1908.

== All-time records ==
=== Test matches ===
Below is the table of the official representative rugby league matches played by Australia at test level up until 16 November 2026:

Opponent	Played	Won	Lost	Drawn	Last meeting	Win%	For	Aga	Diff
Cook Islands	1	1	0	0	2026	100.00%	66	6	+60
England	27	18	7	2	2025	66.67%	598	291	+307
Fiji	9	9	0	0	2026	100.00%	498	60	+438
France	61	45	14	2	2017	73.77%	1476	547	+929
Great Britain*	139	73	61	5	2006	52.52%	2,352	1,745	+607
Ireland	1	1	0	0	2013	100.00%	50	0	+50
Italy	3	3	0	0	2022	100.00%	170	43	+127
Lebanon	2	2	0	0	2022	100.00%	82	4	+78
New Zealand*	148	110	35	3	2026	74.32%	3,377	1,978	+1,399
Māori	9	6	2	1	1980	66.67%	166	107	+59
Papua New Guinea	11	11	0	0	2010	100.00%	580	68	+512
Rest Of The World	3	3	0	0	1997	100.00%	70	29	+41
Russia	1	1	0	0	2000	100.00%	110	4	+106
Samoa	6	6	0	0	2023	100.00%	268	62	+206
Scotland	2	2	0	0	2022	100.00%	138	12	+126
South Africa	3	3	0	0	1995	100.00%	174	33	+141
Tonga†	4	3	1	0	2024	75%	84	46	+38
United States	2	2	0	0	2013	100.00%	98	24	+74
Wales	13	13	0	0	2011	100.00%	455	143	+312
Total	444	312	120	13	2026	70.27%	10,810	5,202	+5,608
*Includes five matches in 1997 as Australia (SL).
†Includes matches played against Tonga Invitational XIII.

=== Margins and streaks ===
Biggest winning margins

Margin	Score	Opponent	Venue	Date
106	110–4	Russia	The Boulevard	4 Nov 2000
84	84–0	Scotland	CBS Arena	21 Oct 2022
82	82–0	Papua New Guinea	Willows Sports Complex	7 Oct 2000

Biggest losing margins

Margin	Score	Opponent	Venue	Date
30	0–30	New Zealand	FMG Stadium Waikato	4 Nov 2023
24	25–49	New Zealand	The Gabba	28 Jun 1952
24	0–24	New Zealand	Elland Road	26 Nov 2005

== Results ==
=== Key ===
Win	Loss	Draw

Bold indicates World Cup match.
Italics indicates that an Australasian team played, which also consisted of players from New Zealand. These games are listed here as test caps (regardless of nationality) were awarded to Australia.

=== 1900s ===
Date	Opponent	F	A	Venue	City	Crowd	Competition
8 May 1908	New Zealand	10	11	Agricultural Oval	Sydney	20,000	1907–08 All Golds tour
30 May 1908	New Zealand	12	24	Exhibition Ground	Brisbane	6,000	1907–08 All Golds tour
6 June 1908	New Zealand	14	9	Agricultural Oval	Sydney	13,000	1907–08 All Golds tour
18 July 1908	New Zealand Māori	20	10	Agricultural Oval	Sydney	6,000	1907–08 All Golds tour
12 December 1908	Great Britain	22	22	Park Royal Ground	London	2,000	1908–09 Kangaroo tour
17 January 1909	Wales	13	14	Penydarren Park	Merthyr Tydfil	6,000	1908–09 Kangaroo tour
23 January 1909	Great Britain	9	14	St James' Park	Newcastle	22,000	1908–09 Kangaroo tour
15 February 1909	Great Britain	5	6	Villa Park	Birmingham	9,000	1908–09 Kangaroo tour
12 June 1909	New Zealand	11	19	Agricultural Oval	Sydney	6,000	1909 All Blacks tour
26 June 1909	New Zealand	10	5	Exhibition Ground	Brisbane	6,000	1909 All Blacks tour
3 July 1909	New Zealand	25	5	Wentworth Park	Sydney	6,000	1909 All Blacks tour
31 July 1909	New Zealand Māori	16	14	Agricultural Oval	Sydney	30,000	1909 Māori tour
14 August 1909	New Zealand Māori	16	13	Brisbane Cricket Ground	Brisbane	8,000	1909 Māori tour
21 August 1909	New Zealand Māori	23	16	Agricultural Oval	Sydney	11,000	1909 Māori tour
28 August 1909	New Zealand Māori	20	13	Agricultural Oval	Sydney	7,500	1909 Māori tour
4 September 1909	Australia Wallabies	29	26	Agricultural Oval	Sydney	18,000	Kangaroos vs Wallabies test series
8 September 1909	Australia Wallabies	21	34	Agricultural Oval	Sydney	2,500	Kangaroos vs Wallabies test series
11 September 1909	Australia Wallabies	6	15	Agricultural Oval	Sydney	14,000	Kangaroos vs Wallabies test series
18 September 1909	Australia Wallabies	8	6	Agricultural Oval	Sydney	4,000	Kangaroos vs Wallabies test series

=== 1910s ===
Date	Opponent	F	A	Venue	City	Crowd	Competition
18 June 1910	Great Britain	20	27	Agricultural Oval	Sydney	42,000	1910 Lions tour
2 July 1910	Great Britain	17	22	Exhibition Ground	Brisbane	18,000	1910 Lions tour
7 October 1911	Wales	28	20	Bridgend Field	Ebbw Vale	7,000	1911–12 Kangaroo tour
8 November 1911	Great Britain	10	19	St James' Park	Newcastle	5,317	1911–12 Kangaroo tour
16 December 1911	Great Britain	11	11	Tynecastle	Edinburgh	8,000	1911–12 Kangaroo tour
1 January 1912	Great Britain	33	8	Villa Park	Birmingham	4,000	1911–12 Kangaroo tour
27 June 1914	Great Britain	5	23	Agricultural Oval	Sydney	40,000	1914 Lions tour
29 June 1914	Great Britain	12	7	Sydney Cricket Ground	Sydney	38,000	1914 Lions tour
4 July 1914	Great Britain	6	14	Sydney Cricket Ground	Sydney	41,000	1914 Lions tour
23 August 1919	New Zealand	44	21	Basin Reserve	Wellington	8,000	1919 Kangaroo tour
30 August 1919	New Zealand	10	26	Addington Showgrounds	Christchurch	7,000	1919 Kangaroo tour
6 September 1919	New Zealand	34	23	Carlaw Park	Auckland	24,300	1919 Kangaroo tour
13 September 1919	New Zealand	32	2	Carlaw Park	Auckland	15,000	1919 Kangaroo tour

=== 1920s ===
Date	Opponent	F	A	Venue	City	Crowd	Competition
26 June 1920	Great Britain	8	4	Exhibition Ground	Brisbane	28,000	1920 Lions tour
3 July 1920	Great Britain	21	8	Sydney Cricket Ground	Sydney	60,000	1920 Lions tour
10 July 1920	Great Britain	13	23	Sydney Cricket Ground	Sydney	32,000	1920 Lions tour
1 October 1921	Great Britain	5	6	Headingley Rugby Stadium	Leeds	32,000	1921–22 Kangaroo tour
10 October 1921	England	5	6	Arsenal Stadium	London	12,000	1921–22 Kangaroo tour
5 November 1921	Great Britain	16	2	The Boulevard	Hull	21,504	1921–22 Kangaroo tour
20 December 1921	Wales	21	16	Taff Vale Park	Pontypridd	13,000	1921–22 Kangaroo tour
14 January 1922	Great Britain	0	6	The Willows	Salford	21,000	1921–22 Kangaroo tour
23 June 1924	Great Britain	3	22	Sydney Cricket Ground	Sydney	50,000	1924 Lions tour
28 June 1924	Great Britain	3	5	Sydney Cricket Ground	Sydney	33,842	1924 Lions tour
12 July 1924	Great Britain	21	11	Exhibition Ground	Brisbane	36,000	1924 Lions tour
23 June 1928	Great Britain	12	15	Exhibition Ground	Brisbane	39,200	1928 Lions tour
14 July 1928	Great Britain	0	8	Sydney Cricket Ground	Sydney	44,548	1928 Lions tour
21 July 1928	Great Britain	21	14	Sydney Cricket Ground	Sydney	37,380	1928 Lions tour
5 October 1929	Great Britain	31	8	Craven Park	Hull	20,000	1929–30 Kangaroo tour
9 November 1929	Great Britain	3	9	Headingley	Leeds	31,402	1929–30 Kangaroo tour

=== 1930s ===
Date	Opponent	F	A	Venue	City	Crowd	Competition
4 January 1930	Great Britain	0	10	Station Road	Swinton	34,709	1929–30 Kangaroo tour
15 January 1930	Great Britain	0	3	Athletic Grounds	Rochdale	16,743	1929–30 Kangaroo tour
18 January 1930	Wales	26	10	Wembley Stadium	London	20,000	1929–30 Kangaroo tour
6 June 1932	Great Britain	6	8	Sydney Cricket Ground	Sydney	70,204	1932 Lions tour
18 June 1932	Great Britain	15	6	Brisbane Cricket Ground	Brisbane	26,500	1932 Lions tour
16 July 1932	Great Britain	13	15	Sydney Cricket Ground	Sydney	50,053	1932 Lions tour
7 October 1933	Great Britain	0	4	Belle Vue Stadium	Manchester	34,000	1933–34 Kangaroo tour
11 November 1933	Great Britain	5	7	Headingley	Leeds	29,618	1933–34 Kangaroo tour
16 December 1933	Great Britain	16	19	Station Road	Swinton	10,990	1933–34 Kangaroo tour
30 December 1933	Wales	51	19	Wembley Stadium	London	10,000	1933–34 Kangaroo tour
31 December 1933	England	63	13	Stade Pershing	Paris	5,000	1933–34 Kangaroo tour
13 January 1934	England	14	19	Redheugh Park	Gateshead	15,576	1933–34 Kangaroo tour
28 September 1935	New Zealand	14	22	Carlaw Park	Auckland	20,000	1935 Kangaroo tour
2 October 1935	New Zealand	31	8	Carlaw Park	Auckland	8,000	1935 Kangaroo tour
4 October 1935	New Zealand	31	8	Carlaw Park	Auckland	20,000	1935 Kangaroo tour
26 June 1936	Great Britain	8	24	Sydney Cricket Ground	Sydney	63,920	1936 Lions tour
4 July 1936	Great Britain	7	12	Brisbane Cricket Ground	Brisbane	29,486	1936 Lions tour
18 July 1936	Great Britain	7	12	Sydney Cricket Ground	Sydney	53,546	1936 Lions tour
7 August 1937	New Zealand	12	8	Carlaw Park	Auckland	12,000	1937–38 Kangaroo tour
11 August 1937	New Zealand Māori	5	16	Carlaw Park	Auckland		1937–38 Kangaroo tour
14 August 1937	New Zealand	15	16	Carlaw Park	Auckland	25,000	1937–38 Kangaroo tour
16 October 1937	Great Britain	4	5	Headingley	Leeds	31,949	1937–38 Kangaroo tour
13 November 1937	Great Britain	3	13	Station Road	Swinton	31,724	1937–38 Kangaroo tour
18 December 1937	Great Britain	13	3	Fartown Ground	Huddersfield	9,093	1937–38 Kangaroo tour
2 January 1938	France	35	6	Stade Pershing	Paris	11,500	1937–38 Kangaroo tour
16 January 1938	France	16	11	Stade Vélodrome	Marseille	24,000	1937–38 Kangaroo tour

=== 1940s ===
Date	Opponent	F	A	Venue	City	Crowd	Competition
17 June 1946	Great Britain	8	8	Sydney Cricket Ground	Sydney	64,526	1946 Lions tour
6 July 1946	Great Britain	5	14	Brisbane Cricket Ground	Brisbane	40,500	1946 Lions tour
20 July 1946	Great Britain	7	20	Sydney Cricket Ground	Sydney	35,924	1946 Lions tour
29 May 1948	New Zealand	19	21	Sydney Cricket Ground	Sydney	55,866	1948 Kiwi tour
12 June 1948	New Zealand	13	4	Brisbane Cricket Ground	Brisbane	23,013	1948 Kiwi tour
9 October 1948	Great Britain	23	21	Headingley	Leeds	36,529	1948–49 Kangaroo tour
6 November 1948	Great Britain	7	16	Station Road	Swinton	36,534	1948–49 Kangaroo tour
20 November 1948	Wales	12	5	St. Helen's Rugby Ground	Swansea	9,224	1948–49 Kangaroo tour
9 January 1949	France	29	10	Stade Vélodrome	Marseille	15,796	1948–49 Kangaroo tour
23 January 1949	France	10	0	Stade Chaban-Delmas	Bordeaux	17,365	1948–49 Kangaroo tour
29 January 1949	Great Britain	9	23	Odsal Stadium	Bradford	42,000	1948–49 Kangaroo tour
17 September 1949	New Zealand	21	26	Basin Reserve	Wellington	7,737	1949 Kangaroo tour
28 September 1949	New Zealand Māori	33	0	Pukekura Park	New Plymouth	1,827	1949 Kangaroo tour
8 October 1949	New Zealand	31	10	Carlaw Park	Auckland	12,361	1949 Kangaroo tour

=== 1950s ===
Date	Opponent	F	A	Venue	City	Crowd	Competition
12 June 1950	Great Britain	4	6	Sydney Cricket Ground	Sydney	47,215	1950 Lions tour
1 July 1950	Great Britain	15	3	Brisbane Cricket Ground	Brisbane	35,000	1950 Lions tour
22 July 1950	Great Britain	5	2	Sydney Cricket Ground	Sydney	45,178	1950 Lions tour
11 June 1951	France	15	26	Sydney Cricket Ground	Sydney	60,160	1951 France tour
30 June 1951	France	23	11	Brisbane Cricket Ground	Brisbane	35,000	1951 France tour
21 July 1951	France	14	35	Sydney Cricket Ground	Sydney	67,005	1951 France tour
9 June 1952	New Zealand	25	13	Sydney Cricket Ground	Sydney	56,376	1952 Kiwi tour
28 June 1952	New Zealand	25	49	Brisbane Cricket Ground	Brisbane	29,245	1952 Kiwi tour
2 July 1952	New Zealand	9	19	Sydney Cricket Ground	Sydney	44,916	1952 Kiwi tour
4 October 1952	Great Britain	6	19	Headingley	Leeds	34,505	1952–53 Kangaroo tour
9 November 1952	Great Britain	5	21	Station Road	Swinton	32,421	1952–53 Kangaroo tour
13 December 1952	Great Britain	27	7	Odsal Stadium	Bradford	30,509	1952–53 Kangaroo tour
27 December 1952	France	16	12	Stade Pershing	Paris	18,327	1952–53 Kangaroo tour
11 January 1953	France	0	5	Stade Chaban-Delmas	Bordeaux	23,419	1952–53 Kangaroo tour
25 January 1953	France	5	13	Stade de Gerland	Lyon	17,545	1952–53 Kangaroo tour
15 April 1953	Rest of the World	33	21	Sydney Cricket Ground	Sydney	20,845	Exhibition match
27 June 1953	New Zealand	5	25	Addington Showgrounds	Christchurch	5,509	1953 Kangaroo tour
4 July 1953	New Zealand	11	12	Basin Reserve	Wellington	5,394	1953 Kangaroo tour
18 July 1953	New Zealand	18	16	Carlaw Park	Auckland	16,033	1953 Kangaroo tour
12 June 1954	Great Britain	37	12	Sydney Cricket Ground	Sydney	65,885	1954 Lions tour
22 June 1954	Rest of the World	20	11	Sydney Cricket Ground	Sydney	30,675	Exhibition match
4 July 1954	Great Britain	21	38	Brisbane Cricket Ground	Brisbane	46,355	1954 Lions tour
17 July 1954	Great Britain	20	16	Sydney Cricket Ground	Sydney	67,577	1954 Lions tour
**31 October** **1954**	**Great Britain**	**12**	**28**	**Stade de Gerland**	**Lyon**	**10,250**	1954 World Cup
**7 November** **1954**	**New Zealand**	**34**	**15**	**Stade Vélodrome**	**Marseille**	**20,000**	1954 World Cup
**11 November** **1954**	**France**	**5**	**15**	**Stade Marcel Saupin**	**Nantes**	**13,000**	1954 World Cup
19 November 1954	New Zealand	18	5	Hilton Park	Leigh		Friendly
11 June 1955	France	5	8	Sydney Cricket Ground	Sydney	62,458	1955 France tour
2 July 1955	France	28	29	Brisbane Cricket Ground	Brisbane	45,745	1955 France tour
23 July 1955	France	20	8	Sydney Cricket Ground	Sydney	67,748	1955 France tour
9 June 1956	New Zealand	12	9	Sydney Cricket Ground	Sydney	46,766	1956 Kiwi tour
23 June 1956	New Zealand	8	2	Exhibition Ground	Brisbane	28,361	1956 Kiwi tour
30 June 1956	New Zealand	31	14	Sydney Cricket Ground	Sydney	49,735	1956 Kiwi tour
1 November 1956	France	15	8	Stade Pershing	Paris	10,789	1956–57 Kangaroo tour
17 November 1956	Great Britain	10	21	Central Park	Wigan	22,473	1956–57 Kangaroo tour
1 December 1956	Great Britain	22	9	Odsal Stadium	Bradford	23,634	1956–57 Kangaroo tour
15 December 1956	Great Britain	0	19	Station Road	Swinton	17,542	1956–57 Kangaroo tour
23 December 1956	France	10	6	Stade Chaban-Delmas	Bordeaux	11,379	1956–57 Kangaroo tour
3 January 1957	France	25	21	Stade de Gerland	Lyon	5,748	1956–57 Kangaroo tour
**15 June** **1957**	**New Zealand**	**25**	**5**	**Brisbane Cricket Ground**	**Brisbane**	**29,636**	1957 World Cup
**17 June** **1957**	**Great Britain**	**31**	**6**	**Sydney Cricket Ground**	**Sydney**	**57,995**	1957 World Cup
**22 June** **1957**	**France**	**17**	**40**	**Sydney Cricket Ground**	**Sydney**	**35,158**	1957 World Cup
29 June 1957	Rest of the World	20	11	Sydney Cricket Ground	Sydney	30,675	Exhibition match
5 July 1958	Great Britain	18	25	Exhibition Ground	Brisbane	33,563	1958 Lions tour
14 June 1958	Great Britain	15	8	Sydney Cricket Ground	Sydney	68,777	1958 Lions tour
19 July 1958	Great Britain	17	40	Sydney Cricket Ground	Sydney	68,720	1958 Lions tour
13 June 1959	New Zealand	9	8	Sydney Cricket Ground	Sydney	38,613	1959 Kiwi tour
27 June 1959	New Zealand	28	10	Exhibition Ground	Brisbane	30,994	1959 Kiwi tour
4 July 1959	New Zealand	12	28	Sydney Cricket Ground	Sydney	31,629	1959 Kiwi tour
17 October 1959	Great Britain	22	14	Station Road	Swinton	35,224	1959–60 Kangaroo tour
31 October 1959	France	20	19	Stade Pershing	Paris	9,864	1959–60 Kangaroo tour
21 November 1959	Great Britain	10	11	Headingley	Leeds	30,184	1959–60 Kangaroo tour
12 December 1959	Great Britain	12	18	Central Park	Wigan	26,086	1959–60 Kangaroo tour
20 December 1959	France	17	12	Stade Chaban-Delmas	Bordeaux	8,848	1959–60 Kangaroo tour

=== 1960s ===
Date	Opponent	F	A	Venue	City	Crowd	Competition
20 January 1960	France	16	8	Parc Des Sports	Roanne	3,437	1959–60 Kangaroo tour
23 January 1960	Italy	37	15	Stadio Euganeo	Padua	3,500	1959–60 Kangaroo tour
24 January 1960	Italy	67	22	Stadio Omobono Tenni	Treviso	3,105	1959–60 Kangaroo tour
11 June 1960	France	8	8	Sydney Cricket Ground	Sydney	49,868	1960 France tour
2 July 1960	France	56	6	Exhibition Ground	Brisbane	32,644	1960 France tour
16 July 1960	France	5	7	Sydney Cricket Ground	Sydney	29,127	1960 France tour
**24 September** **1960**	**France**	**13**	**12**	**Central Park**	**Wigan**	**20,278**	1960 World Cup
**1 October** **1960**	**New Zealand**	**21**	**15**	**Headingley**	**Leeds**	**10,773**	1960 World Cup
**8 October** **1960**	**Great Britain**	**3**	**10**	**Odsal Stadium**	**Bradford**	**35,023**	1960 World Cup
17 June 1961	New Zealand Māori	25	13	Rotorua International Stadium	Rotorua	1,787	1961 Kangaroo tour
1 July 1961	New Zealand	10	12	Carlaw Park	Auckland	11,485	1961 Kangaroo tour
8 July 1961	New Zealand	8	10	Carlaw Park	Auckland	12,424	1961 Kangaroo tour
9 June 1962	Great Britain	12	31	Sydney Cricket Ground	Sydney	70,174	1962 Lions tour
30 June 1962	Great Britain	10	17	Lang Park	Brisbane	34,766	1962 Lions tour
14 July 1962	Great Britain	18	17	Sydney Cricket Ground	Sydney	42,104	1962 Lions tour
7 June 1963	New Zealand	7	3	Sydney Cricket Ground	Sydney	48,330	1963 Kiwi tour
22 June 1963	New Zealand	13	16	Lang Park	Brisbane	30,748	1963 Kiwi tour
29 June 1963	New Zealand	18	17	Sydney Cricket Ground	Sydney	45,657	1963 Kiwi tour
20 July 1963	South Africa	34	6	Lang Park	Brisbane	10,210	1963 Rhinos tour
27 July 1963	South Africa	54	21	Sydney Cricket Ground	Sydney	16,995	1963 Rhinos tour
16 October 1963	Great Britain	28	2	Wembley Stadium	London	13,946	1963–64 Kangaroo tour
9 November 1963	Great Britain	50	12	Station Road	Swinton	30,833	1963–64 Kangaroo tour
30 November 1963	Great Britain	5	16	Headingley	Leeds	20,947	1963–64 Kangaroo tour
8 December 1963	France	5	8	Stade Chaban-Delmas	Bordeaux	4,261	1963–64 Kangaroo tour
22 December 1963	France	21	9	Stade de Toulouse	Toulouse	6,932	1963–64 Kangaroo tour
18 January 1964	France	16	8	Parc des Princes	Paris	5,979	1963–64 Kangaroo tour
13 June 1964	France	20	6	Sydney Cricket Ground	Sydney	20,070	1964 France tour
4 July 1964	France	27	2	Lang Park	Brisbane	20,076	1964 France tour
18 July 1964	France	35	9	Sydney Cricket Ground	Sydney	16,731	1964 France tour
19 July 1965	New Zealand	13	8	Carlaw Park	Auckland	13,295	1965 Kangaroo tour
26 June 1965	New Zealand	5	7	Carlaw Park	Auckland	11,385	1965 Kangaroo tour
25 June 1966	Great Britain	13	17	Sydney Cricket Ground	Sydney	57,962	1966 Lions tour
16 July 1966	Great Britain	6	4	Lang Park	Brisbane	45,057	1966 Lions tour
23 July 1966	Great Britain	19	14	Sydney Cricket Ground	Sydney	63,505	1966 Lions tour
10 June 1967	New Zealand	22	13	Sydney Cricket Ground	Sydney	33,416	1967 Kiwi tour
1 July 1967	New Zealand	35	22	Lang Park	Brisbane	30,122	1967 Kiwi tour
8 July 1967	New Zealand	13	9	Sydney Cricket Ground	Sydney	27,530	1967 Kiwi tour
21 October 1967	Great Britain	11	16	Headingley	Leeds	22,293	1967–68 Kangaroo tour
3 November 1967	Great Britain	17	11	White City Stadium	London	17,445	1967–68 Kangaroo tour
9 December 1967	Great Britain	11	3	Station Road	Swinton	13,615	1967–68 Kangaroo tour
17 December 1967	France	7	7	Stade Vélodrome	Marseille	5,193	1967–68 Kangaroo tour
24 December 1967	France	10	3	Stade d'Albert Domec	Carcassonne	4,971	1967–68 Kangaroo tour
7 January 1968	France	16	13	Stade de Toulouse	Toulouse	4,898	1967–68 Kangaroo tour
**25 May** **1968**	**Great Britain**	**25**	**10**	**Sydney Cricket Ground**	**Sydney**	**62,256**	1968 World Cup
**1 June** **1968**	**New Zealand**	**31**	**12**	**Lang Park**	**Brisbane**	**23,608**	1968 World Cup
**8 June** **1968**	**France**	**37**	**4**	**Lang Park**	**Brisbane**	**32,664**	1968 World Cup
**10 June** **1968**	**France**	**20**	**2**	**Sydney Cricket Ground**	**Sydney**	**54,290**	1968 World Cup
1 June 1969	New Zealand	20	10	Carlaw Park	Auckland	13,375	1969 Kangaroo tour
7 June 1969	New Zealand	14	18	Carlaw Park	Auckland	9,848	1969 Kangaroo tour

=== 1970s ===
Date	Opponent	F	A	Venue	City	Crowd	Competition
6 June 1970	Great Britain	37	15	Lang Park	Brisbane	42,807	1970 Lions tour
20 June 1970	Great Britain	7	28	Sydney Cricket Ground	Sydney	60,962	1970 Lions tour
4 July 1970	Great Britain	17	21	Sydney Cricket Ground	Sydney	61,258	1970 Lions tour
**21 October 1970**	**New Zealand**	**47**	**11**	**Central Park**	**Wigan**	**9,586**	1970 World Cup
**24 October 1970**	**Great Britain**	**4**	**11**	**Headingley**	**Leeds**	**15,084**	1970 World Cup
**1 November 1970**	**France**	**15**	**17**	**Odsal Stadium**	**Bradford**	**6,215**	1970 World Cup
**7 November 1970**	**Great Britain**	**12**	**7**	**Headingley**	**Leeds**	**18,776**	1970 World Cup
26 June 1971	New Zealand	3	24	Carlaw Park	Auckland	13,917	Friendly
8 July 1972	New Zealand	36	11	Sydney Cricket Ground	Sydney	29,714	1972 Kiwi tour
15 July 1972	New Zealand	31	7	Lang Park	Brisbane	24,000	1972 Kiwi tour
**29 October 1972**	**Great Britain**	**21**	**27**	**Stade Gilbert Brutus**	**Perpignan**	**6,324**	1972 World Cup
**1 November 1972**	**New Zealand**	**9**	**5**	**Parc des Princes**	**Paris**	**8,000**	1972 World Cup
**5 November 1972**	**France**	**31**	**9**	**Stade de Toulouse**	**Toulouse**	**10,332**	1972 World Cup
**11 November 1972**	**Great Britain**	**10**	**10**	**Stade de Gerland**	**Lyon**	**4,321**	1972 World Cup
3 November 1973	Great Britain	12	21	Wembley Stadium	London	9,874	1973 Kangaroo tour
24 November 1973	Great Britain	14	6	Headingley	Leeds	16,674	1973 Kangaroo tour
1 December 1973	Great Britain	15	5	Wilderspool	Warrington	10,019	1973 Kangaroo tour
9 December 1973	France	21	11	Stade Gilbert Brutus	Perpignan	7,630	1973 Kangaroo tour
16 December 1973	France	14	3	Stade de Toulouse	Toulouse	5,000	1973 Kangaroo tour
15 June 1974	Great Britain	12	6	Lang Park	Brisbane	30,280	1974 Lions tour
6 July 1974	Great Britain	11	16	Sydney Cricket Ground	Sydney	48,006	1974 Lions tour
20 July 1974	Great Britain	22	18	Sydney Cricket Ground	Sydney	55,505	1974 Lions tour
**1 June 1975**	**New Zealand**	**36**	**8**	**Lang Park**	**Brisbane**	**10,000**	1975 World Cup
**14 June 1975**	**Wales**	**13**	**3**	**Sydney Cricket Ground**	**Sydney**	**25,386**	1975 World Cup
**22 June 1975**	**France**	**26**	**6**	**Lang Park**	**Brisbane**	**9,000**	1975 World Cup
**28 June 1975**	**England**	**10**	**10**	**Sydney Cricket Ground**	**Sydney**	**33,858**	1975 World Cup
**27 September 1975**	**New Zealand**	**24**	**8**	**Carlaw Park**	**Auckland**	**20,000**	1975 World Cup
**19 October 1975**	**Wales**	**18**	**6**	**St Helens Rugby and Cricket Ground**	**Swansea**	**11,112**	1975 World Cup
**26 October 1975**	**France**	**41**	**2**	**Stade Gilbert Brutus**	**Perpignan**	**10,440**	1975 World Cup
**1 November 1975**	**England**	**13**	**16**	**Central Park**	**Wigan**	**9,393**	1975 World Cup
**12 November 1975**	**England**	**25**	**0**	**Headingley**	**Leeds**	**7,727**	1975 World Cup
**29 May 1977**	**New Zealand**	**27**	**12**	**Carlaw Park**	**Auckland**	**18,000**	1977 World Cup
**11 June 1977**	**France**	**21**	**9**	**Sydney Cricket Ground**	**Sydney**	**13,231**	1977 World Cup
**18 June 1977**	**Great Britain**	**19**	**5**	**Lang Park**	**Brisbane**	**27,000**	1977 World Cup
**25 June 1977**	**Great Britain**	**13**	**12**	**Sydney Cricket Ground**	**Sydney**	**24,457**	1977 World Cup
24 June 1978	New Zealand	24	2	Sydney Cricket Ground	Sydney	16,577	1978 Kiwi tour
15 July 1978	New Zealand	38	7	Lang Park	Brisbane	14,000	1978 Kiwi tour
22 July 1978	New Zealand	33	16	Sydney Cricket Ground	Sydney	6,541	1978 Kiwi tour
15 October 1978	Great Britain	15	9	Central Park	Wigan	17,644	1978 Kangaroo tour
5 November 1978	Great Britain	14	18	Odsal Stadium	Bradford	26,447	1978 Kangaroo tour
18 November 1978	Great Britain	23	6	Headingley	Leeds	29,627	1978 Kangaroo tour
26 November 1978	France	10	13	Stade d'Albert Domec	Carcassonne	7,000	1978 Kangaroo tour
10 December 1978	France	10	11	Stade de Toulouse	Toulouse	7,060	1978 Kangaroo tour
16 June 1979	Great Britain	35	0	Lang Park	Brisbane	23,000	1979 Lions tour
30 June 1979	Great Britain	24	16	Sydney Cricket Ground	Sydney	26,857	1979 Lions tour
14 July 1979	Great Britain	21	7	Sydney Cricket Ground	Sydney	16,844	1979 Lions tour

=== 1980s ===
Date	Opponent	F	A	Venue	City	Crowd	Competition
1 June 1980	New Zealand	17	6	Carlaw Park	Auckland	12,321	1980 Kangaroo tour
4 June 1980	New Zealand Māori	10	10	Carlaw Park	Auckland	5,000	1980 Kangaroo tour
15 June 1980	New Zealand	15	6	Carlaw Park	Auckland	9,706	1980 Kangaroo tour
4 July 1981	France	43	3	Sydney Cricket Ground	Sydney	16,227	1981 France tour
18 July 1981	France	17	2	Lang Park	Brisbane	14,000	1981 France tour
3 July 1982	New Zealand	11	8	Lang Park	Brisbane	11,400	1982 Kiwi tour
17 July 1982	New Zealand	20	2	Sydney Cricket Ground	Sydney	16,775	1982 Kiwi tour
2 October 1982	Papua New Guinea	38	2	Lloyd Robson Oval	Port Moresby	15,000	1982 Kangaroo tour
24 October 1982	Wales	37	7	Ninian Park	Cardiff	5,617	1982 Kangaroo tour
30 October 1982	Great Britain	40	4	Boothferry Park	Hull	26,771	1982 Kangaroo tour
20 November 1982	Great Britain	27	6	Central Park	Wigan	23,126	1982 Kangaroo tour
28 November 1982	Great Britain	32	8	Headingley	Leeds	17,318	1982 Kangaroo tour
5 December 1982	France	15	4	Parc des Sports	Avignon	8,000	1982 Kangaroo tour
18 December 1982	France	23	9	Stade L'Egassiarial	Narbonne	7,000	1982 Kangaroo tour
12 June 1983	New Zealand	16	4	Carlaw Park	Auckland	18,000	Trans-Tasman series
9 July 1983	New Zealand	12	19	Lang Park	Brisbane	15,000	Trans-Tasman series
12 June 1984	Great Britain	25	8	Sydney Cricket Ground	Sydney	30,190	1984 Lions tour
30 June 1984	Great Britain	18	6	Lang Park	Brisbane	26,534	1984 Lions tour
7 July 1984	Great Britain	20	7	Sydney Cricket Ground	Sydney	18,756	1984 Lions tour
18 June 1985	New Zealand	26	20	Lang Park	Brisbane	22,000	1985 Kangaroo tour
30 June 1985	New Zealand	10	6	Carlaw Park	Auckland	19,132	1985 Kangaroo tour
**7 July** **1985**	**New Zealand**	**0**	**18**	**Carlaw Park**	**Auckland**	**15,327**	1985–1988 World Cup
6 July 1986	New Zealand	22	8	Carlaw Park	Auckland	14,566	1986 Kiwi tour
19 July 1986	New Zealand	29	12	Sydney Cricket Ground	Sydney	34,302	1986 Kiwi tour
**29 July** **1986**	**New Zealand**	**32**	**12**	**Lang Park**	**Brisbane**	**22,811**	1985–1988 World Cup
**4 October** **1986**	**Papua New Guinea**	**62**	**12**	**Lloyd Robson Oval**	**Port Moresby**	**17,000**	1985–1988 World Cup
25 October 1986	Great Britain	38	16	Old Trafford	Manchester	50,583	1986 Kangaroo tour
8 November 1986	Great Britain	34	4	Elland Road	Leeds	30,808	1986 Kangaroo tour
**22 November** **1986**	**Great Britain**	**24**	**15**	**Central Park**	**Wigan**	**20,169**	1985–1988 World Cup
30 November 1986	France	44	2	Stade Gilbert Brutus	Perpignan	6,000	1986 Kangaroo tour
**13 December** **1986**	**France**	**52**	**0**	**Stade d'Albert Domec**	**Carcassonne**	**5,000**	1985–1988 World Cup
28 June 1987	New Zealand	6	13	Lang Park	Brisbane	16,500	Friendly
11 June 1988	Great Britain	17	6	Sydney Football Stadium	Sydney	24,480	1988 Lions tour
28 June 1988	Great Britain	34	14	Lang Park	Brisbane	27,130	1988 Lions tour
**9 July** **1988**	**Great Britain**	**12**	**26**	**Sydney Football Stadium**	**Sydney**	**15,944**	1985–1988 World Cup
**20 July** **1988**	**Papua New Guinea**	**70**	**8**	**Eric Weissel Oval**	**Wagga Wagga**	**11,685**	1985–1988 World Cup
27 July 1988	Rest of the World	22	10	Sydney Cricket Ground	Sydney	15,301	Exhibition match
**9 October** **1988**	**New Zealand**	**25**	**12**	**Eden Park**	**Auckland**	**47,329**	1985–1988 World Cup
10 July 1989	New Zealand	26	6	Queen Elizabeth II Park	Christchurch	17,000	1989 Kangaroo tour
16 July 1989	New Zealand	8	0	Rotorua International Stadium	Rotorua	26,000	1989 Kangaroo tour
23 July 1989	**New Zealand**	**22**	**14**	**Mount Smart Stadium**	**Auckland**	**15,000**	1989–1992 World Cup

=== 1990s ===
Date	Opponent	F	A	Venue	City	Crowd	Competition
**27 June 1990**	**France**	**34**	**2**	**Pioneer Oval**	**Parkes**	**12,384**	1989–1992 World Cup
19 August 1990	New Zealand	24	6	Athletic Park	Wellington	25,000	Friendly
27 October 1990	Great Britain	12	19	Wembley Stadium	London	52,274	1990 Kangaroo tour
10 November 1990	Great Britain	14	10	Old Trafford	Manchester	46,615	1990 Kangaroo tour
**24 November 1990**	**Great Britain**	**14**	**0**	**Elland Road**	**Leeds**	**32,500**	1989–1992 World Cup
2 December 1990	France	60	4	Parc de Sports	Avignon	3,000	1990 Kangaroo tour
**9 December 1990**	**France**	**34**	**10**	**Stade Aimé Giral**	**Perpignan**	**2,000**	1989–1992 World Cup
3 July 1991	New Zealand	8	24	Olympic Park Stadium	Melbourne	26,900	1991 Trans-Tasman Test series
24 July 1991	New Zealand	44	0	Sydney Football Stadium	Sydney	34,911	1991 Trans-Tasman Test series
**31 July 1991**	**New Zealand**	**40**	**12**	**Lang Park**	**Brisbane**	**26,200**	1989–1992 World Cup
6 October 1991	Papua New Guinea	58	2	Danny Leahy Oval	Goroka	13,000	1991 Kangaroo tour
**13 October 1991**	**Papua New Guinea**	**40**	**6**	**Lloyd Robson Oval**	**Port Moresby**	**14,500**	1989–1992 World Cup
12 June 1992	Great Britain	22	6	Sydney Football Stadium	Sydney	40,141	1992 Lions tour
26 June 1992	Great Britain	10	33	Princes Park	Melbourne	31,005	1992 Lions tour
**3 July 1992**	**Great Britain**	**16**	**10**	**Lang Park**	**Brisbane**	**32,313**	1989–1992 World Cup
**15 July 1992**	**Papua New Guinea**	**36**	**14**	**Townsville Sports Reserve**	**Townsville**	**12,470**	1989–1992 World Cup
**24 October 1992**	**Great Britain**	**10**	**6**	**Wembley Stadium**	London	**73,761**	1989–1992 World Cup
20 June 1993	New Zealand	14	14	Mount Smart Stadium	Auckland	22,994	1993 Trans-Tasman Test series
25 June 1993	New Zealand	16	8	Palmerston North Showgrounds	Palmerston North	19,000	1993 Trans-Tasman Test series
30 June 1993	New Zealand	16	4	Lang Park	Brisbane	31,000	1993 Trans-Tasman Test series
6 July 1994	France	58	0	Parramatta Stadium	Sydney	27,318	1994 France tour
22 October 1994	Great Britain	4	8	Wembley Stadium	London	57,034	1994 Kangaroo tour
30 October 1994	Wales	46	4	Ninian Park	Cardiff	8,729	1994 Kangaroo tour
5 November 1994	Great Britain	38	8	Old Trafford	Manchester	43,930	1994 Kangaroo tour
20 November 1994	Great Britain	23	4	Elland Road	Leeds	39,486	1994 Kangaroo tour
4 December 1994	France	74	0	Stade de la Méditerranée	Béziers	8,000	1994 Kangaroo tour
23 June 1995	New Zealand	26	8	Lang Park	Brisbane	25,304	1995 Trans-Tasman Test series
7 July 1995	New Zealand	20	10	Sydney Football Stadium	Sydney	27,568	1995 Trans-Tasman Test series
14 July 1995	New Zealand	46	10	Lang Park	Brisbane	20,803	1995 Trans-Tasman Test series
**7 October** **1995**	**England**	**16**	**20**	**Wembley Stadium**	**London**	**41,271**	1995 World Cup
**10 October** **1995**	**South Africa**	**86**	**6**	**Gateshead International Stadium**	**Gateshead**	**9,191**	1995 World Cup
**14 October** **1995**	**Fiji**	**66**	**0**	**Kirklees Stadium**	**Huddersfield**	**7,127**	1995 World Cup
**22 October** **1995**	**New Zealand**	**30**	**20**	**Kirklees Stadium**	**Huddersfield**	**16,608**	1995 World Cup
**28 October** **1995**	**England**	**16**	**8**	**Wembley Stadium**	**London**	**66,540**	1995 World Cup
12 July 1996^{1}	Fiji	84	14	Newcastle International Sports Centre	Newcastle	19,000	Friendly
6 October 1996^{1}	Papua New Guinea	52	8	Lloyd Robson Oval	Port Moresby	15,000	Friendly

^{1} These matches are only recognised as tests by the Australian Rugby League (ARL).

=== 1997: Super League Tests ===
The following Super League matches are considered to be tests by the Rugby League International Federation, New Zealand Rugby League and Rugby Football League, but not by the Australian Rugby League.

Date	Opponent	F	A	Venue	City	Crowd	Competition
25 April 1997	New Zealand	34	22	Sydney Football Stadium	Sydney	23,829	1997 Anzac Test
11 July 1997	Rest of the World	28	8	Lang Park	Brisbane	14,927	Exhibition match
26 September 1997	New Zealand	12	30	North Harbour Stadium	Auckland	17,500	Friendly
1 November 1997	Great Britain	38	14	Wembley Stadium	London	41,135	1997 Super League Series
16 November 1997	Great Britain	12	20	Old Trafford	Manchester	39,337	1997 Super League Series
20 November 1997	Great Britain	37	20	Elland Road	Leeds	40,324	1997 Super League Series

=== 1990s (continued) ===
Date	Opponent	F	A	Venue	City	Crowd	Competition
24 April 1998	New Zealand	16	22	North Harbour Stadium	Auckland	24,640	1998 Anzac Test
9 October 1998	New Zealand	30	12	Lang Park	Brisbane	18,571	Friendly
16 October 1998	New Zealand	36	16	North Harbour Stadium	Auckland	24,620	Friendly
23 April 1999	New Zealand	20	14	Stadium Australia	Sydney	30,245	1999 Anzac Test
15 October 1999	New Zealand	22	24	Mount Smart Stadium	Auckland	22,131	1999 Tri-Nations
22 October 1999	Great Britain	42	6	Lang Park	Brisbane	12,511	1999 Tri-Nations
5 November 1999	New Zealand	22	20	Mount Smart Stadium	Auckland	21,204	1999 Tri-Nations

=== 2000s ===
Date	Opponent	F	A	Venue	City	Crowd	Competition
21 April 2000	New Zealand	52	0	Stadium Australia	Sydney	26,023	2000 Anzac Test
7 October 2000	Papua New Guinea	82	0	Willows Sports Complex	Townsville	21,000	Friendly
**28 October** **2000**	**England**	**22**	**2**	**Twickenham Stadium**	**London**	**32,758**	2000 World Cup
**1 November** **2000**	**Fiji**	**66**	**8**	**Gateshead International Stadium**	**Gateshead**	**4,167**	2000 World Cup
**4 November** **2000**	**Russia**	**110**	**4**	**The Boulevard**	**Hull**	**3,444**	2000 World Cup
**11 November** **2000**	**Samoa**	**66**	**10**	**Vicarage Road**	**Watford**	**5,404**	2000 World Cup
**19 November** **2000**	**Wales**	**46**	**22**	**Kirklees Stadium**	**Huddersfield**	**8,114**	2000 World Cup
**25 November** **2000**	**New Zealand**	**40**	**12**	**Old Trafford**	**Manchester**	**44,329**	2000 World Cup
13 July 2001	New Zealand	28	10	Wellington Stadium	Wellington	26,580	Friendly
7 October 2001	Papua New Guinea	54	12	Lloyd Robson Oval	Port Moresby	16,000	Friendly
11 November 2001	Great Britain	12	20	Kirklees Stadium	Huddersfield	21,758	2001 Kangaroo tour
17 November 2001	Great Britain	40	12	Reebok Stadium	Bolton	22,152	2001 Kangaroo tour
24 November 2001	Great Britain	28	8	JJB Stadium	Wigan	25,011	2001 Kangaroo tour
12 July 2002	Great Britain	64	10	Sydney Football Stadium	Sydney	31,844	Friendly
12 October 2002	New Zealand	32	24	Wellington Stadium	Wellington	25,015	Friendly
25 July 2003	New Zealand	48	6	Sydney Football Stadium	Sydney	30,605	Friendly
18 October 2003	New Zealand	16	30	North Harbour Stadium	Auckland	21,926	Friendly
2 November 2003	Wales	76	4	Brewery Field	Bridgend	3,112	2003 Kangaroo tour
7 November 2003	Great Britain	22	18	JJB Stadium	Wigan	24,614	2003 Kangaroo tour
14 November 2003	Great Britain	23	20	KC Stadium	Hull	25,147	2003 Kangaroo tour
21 November 2003	Great Britain	18	12	Kirklees Stadium	Huddersfield	24,163	2003 Kangaroo tour
23 April 2004	New Zealand	37	10	Newcastle Sports Centre	Newcastle	21,537	2004 Anzac Test
16 October 2004	New Zealand	16	16	North Harbour Stadium	Auckland	19,118	2004 Tri-Nations
23 October 2004	New Zealand	32	12	Loftus Road	London	16,725	2004 Tri-Nations
30 October 2004	Great Britain	12	8	City of Manchester Stadium	Manchester	38,572	2004 Tri-Nations
13 November 2004	Great Britain	12	24	JJB Stadium	Wigan	25,004	2004 Tri-Nations
21 November 2004	France	52	30	Stade Ernest-Wallon	Toulouse	10,000	Friendly
27 November 2004	Great Britain	44	4	Elland Road	Leeds	39,200	2004 Tri-Nations
1 December 2004	United States	36	24	Franklin Field	Philadelphia	10,000	Friendly
22 April 2005	New Zealand	32	16	Lang Park	Brisbane	40,317	2005 Anzac Test
15 October 2005	New Zealand	28	38	Stadium Australia	Sydney	28,255	2005 Tri-Nations
21 October 2005	New Zealand	28	26	Mount Smart Stadium	Auckland	16,258	2005 Tri-Nations
6 November 2005	Great Britain	26	6	JJB Stadium	Wigan	25,004	2005 Tri-Nations
13 November 2005	France	44	12	Stade Aimé Giral	Perpignan	7,913	Friendly
19 November 2005	Great Britain	26	14	KC Stadium	Hull	25,150	2005 Tri-Nations
26 November 2005	New Zealand	0	24	Elland Road	Leeds	26,514	2005 Tri-Nations
5 May 2006	New Zealand	50	12	Lang Park	Brisbane	44,191	2006 Anzac Test
14 October 2006	New Zealand	30	18	Mount Smart Stadium	Auckland	17,887	2006 Tri-Nations
21 October 2006	New Zealand	20	15	Docklands Stadium	Melbourne	30,732	2006 Tri-Nations
4 November 2006	Great Britain	12	23	Sydney Football Stadium	Sydney	24,953	2006 Tri-Nations
18 November 2006	Great Britain	33	10	Lang Park	Brisbane	44,258	2006 Tri-Nations
25 November 2006	New Zealand	16	12	Sydney Football Stadium	Sydney	27,325	2006 Tri-Nations
20 April 2007	New Zealand	30	6	Lang Park	Brisbane	35,241	2007 Anzac Test
13 October 2007	New Zealand	58	0	Wellington Stadium	Wellington	16,681	Friendly
9 May 2008	New Zealand	28	12	Sydney Cricket Ground	Sydney	34,571	2008 Anzac Test
**25 October** **2008**	**New Zealand**	**30**	**6**	**Sydney Football Stadium**	**Sydney**	**34,157**	2008 World Cup
**2 November** **2008**	**England**	**52**	**4**	**Docklands Stadium**	**Melbourne**	**36,927**	2008 World Cup
**9 November** **2008**	**Papua New Guinea**	**46**	**6**	**Willows Sports Complex**	**Townsville**	**16,239**	2008 World Cup
**16 November** **2008**	**Fiji**	**52**	**0**	**Sydney Football Stadium**	**Sydney**	**15,855**	2008 World Cup
**22 November** **2008**	**New Zealand**	**20**	**34**	**Lang Park**	**Brisbane**	**50,559**	2008 World Cup
8 May 2009	New Zealand	38	10	Lang Park	Brisbane	37,152	2009 Anzac Test
24 October 2009	New Zealand	20	20	Twickenham Stoop Stadium	London	8,657	2009 Four Nations
31 October 2009	England	26	16	DW Stadium	Wigan	23,122	2009 Four Nations
7 November 2009	France	42	4	Stade Charléty	Paris	8,657	2009 Four Nations
14 November 2009	England	46	16	Elland Road	Leeds	31,042	2009 Four Nations

=== 2010s ===
Date	Opponent	F	A	Venue	City	Crowd	Competition
7 May 2010	New Zealand	12	8	Melbourne Rectangular Stadium	Melbourne	29,442	2010 Anzac Test
24 October 2010	Papua New Guinea	42	0	Parramatta Stadium	Sydney	11,308	2010 Four Nations
31 October 2010	England	34	14	Melbourne Rectangular Stadium	Melbourne	18,894	2010 Four Nations
6 November 2010	New Zealand	34	20	Eden Park	Auckland	44,324	2010 Four Nations
13 November 2010	New Zealand	12	16	Lang Park	Brisbane	36,299	2010 Four Nations
6 May 2011	New Zealand	20	10	Robina Stadium	Gold Coast	26,301	2011 Anzac Test
16 October 2011	New Zealand	42	6	Newcastle Sports Centre	Newcastle	32,890	Friendly
28 October 2011	New Zealand	26	12	Halliwell Jones Stadium	Warrington	12,491	2011 Four Nations
5 November 2011	England	36	20	Wembley Stadium	London	42,344	2011 Four Nations
13 November 2011	Wales	56	14	Racecourse Ground	Wrexham	5,233	2011 Four Nations
19 November 2011	England	30	8	Elland Road	Leeds	34,174	2011 Four Nations
20 April 2012	New Zealand	20	12	Eden Park	Auckland	35,339	2012 Anzac Test
13 October 2012	New Zealand	18	10	Willows Sports Complex	Townsville	26,497	Friendly
19 April 2013	New Zealand	32	12	Canberra Stadium	Canberra	25,628	2013 Anzac Test
**26 October** **2013**	**England**	**28**	**20**	**Millennium Stadium**	**Cardiff**	**45,052**	2013 World Cup
**2 November** **2013**	**Fiji**	**34**	**2**	**Langtree Park**	**St. Helens**	**14,137**	2013 World Cup
**9 November** **2013**	**Ireland**	**50**	**0**	**Thomond Park**	**Limerick**	**5,021**	2013 World Cup
**16 November** **2013**	**United States**	**62**	**0**	**The Racecourse Ground**	**Wrexham**	**5,762**	2013 World Cup
**23 November** **2013**	**Fiji**	**64**	**0**	**Wembley Stadium**	**London**	**67,545**	2013 World Cup
**30 November** **2013**	**New Zealand**	**34**	**2**	**Old Trafford**	**Manchester**	**74,468**	2013 World Cup
2 May 2014	New Zealand	30	18	Sydney Football Stadium	Sydney	25,429	2014 Anzac Test
25 October 2014	New Zealand	12	30	Lang Park	Brisbane	47,813	2014 Four Nations
2 November 2014	England	16	12	Melbourne Rectangular Stadium	Melbourne	20,585	2014 Four Nations
9 November 2014	Samoa	44	18	Wollongong Showground	Wollongong	18,456	2014 Four Nations
15 November 2014	New Zealand	18	22	Wellington Stadium	Wellington	25,183	2014 Four Nations
3 May 2015	New Zealand	12	26	Lang Park	Brisbane	32,681	2015 Anzac Test
6 May 2016	New Zealand	16	0	Newcastle International Sports Centre	Newcastle	27,724	2016 Anzac Test
15 October 2016	New Zealand	26	6	Perth Oval	Perth	20,283	Friendly
28 October 2016	Scotland	54	12	KC Lightstream Stadium	Hull	5,337	2016 Four Nations
5 November 2016	New Zealand	14	8	Ricoh Arena	Coventry	21,009	2016 Four Nations
13 November 2016	England	36	18	London Stadium	London	35,569	2016 Four Nations
20 November 2016	New Zealand	34	8	Anfield	Liverpool	40,042	2016 Four Nations
5 May 2017	New Zealand	30	12	Canberra Stadium	Canberra	18,535	2017 Anzac Test
**27 October** **2017**	**England**	**18**	**4**	**Melbourne Rectangular Stadium**	**Melbourne**	**22,724**	2017 World Cup
**3 November** **2017**	**France**	**52**	**6**	**Canberra Stadium**	**Canberra**	**12,293**	2017 World Cup
**11 November** **2017**	**Lebanon**	**34**	**0**	**Sydney Football Stadium**	**Sydney**	**21,127**	2017 World Cup
**17 November** **2017**	**Samoa**	**46**	**0**	**Darwin Stadium**	**Darwin**	**13,473**	2017 World Cup
**24 November** **2017**	**Fiji**	**54**	**6**	**Lang Park**	**Brisbane**	**22,073**	2017 World Cup
**2 December** **2017**	**England**	**6**	**0**	**Lang Park**	**Brisbane**	**40,033**	2017 World Cup
13 October 2018	New Zealand	24	26	Mount Smart Stadium	Auckland	12,763	Friendly
20 October 2018	Tonga	34	16	Mount Smart Stadium	Auckland	26,214	Friendly
25 October 2019	New Zealand	26	4	Wollongong Showground	Wollongong	18,104	2019 Oceania Cup
2 November 2019	Tonga	12	16	Eden Park	Auckland	25,575	2019 Oceania Cup

=== 2020s ===
Date	Opponent	F	A	Venue	City	Crowd	Competition
**15 October 2022**	**Fiji**	**42**	**8**	**Headingley Rugby Stadium**	**Leeds**	**13,366**	2021 World Cup
**21 October 2022**	**Scotland**	**84**	**0**	**Ricoh Arena**	**Coventry**	**10,276**	2021 World Cup
**29 October 2022**	**Italy**	**66**	**6**	**Totally Wicked Stadium**	**St Helens**	**5,586**	2021 World Cup
**4 November 2022**	**Lebanon**	**48**	**4**	**Kirklees Stadium**	**Huddersfield**	**8,206**	2021 World Cup
**11 November 2022**	**New Zealand**	**16**	**14**	**Elland Road**	**Leeds**	**28,113**	2021 World Cup
**19 November 2022**	**Samoa**	**30**	**10**	**Old Trafford**	**Manchester**	**67,502**	2021 World Cup
14 October 2023	Samoa	38	12	North Queensland Stadium	Townsville	18,144	2023 Pacific Cup
28 October 2023	New Zealand	36	18	Melbourne Rectangular Stadium	Melbourne	20,584	2023 Pacific Cup
4 November 2023	New Zealand	0	30	Waikato Stadium	Hamilton	13,269	2023 Pacific Cup
18 October 2024	Tonga	18	0	Lang Park	Brisbane	33,196	2024 Pacific Cup
27 October 2024	New Zealand	22	10	Rugby League Park	Christchurch	17,005	2024 Pacific Cup
10 November 2024	Tonga	20	14	Western Sydney Stadium	Sydney	28,728	2024 Pacific Cup
25 October 2025	England	26	6	Wembley Stadium	London	60,812	2025 Kangaroo tour
1 November 2025	England	14	4	Bramley-Moore Dock Stadium	Liverpool	52,106	2025 Kangaroo tour
8 November 2025	England	30	8	Headingley Rugby Stadium	Leeds	19,500	2025 Kangaroo tour
**15 October 2026**	**New Zealand**	**24**	**22**	**Sydney Football Stadium**	**Sydney**	**41,255**	2026 World Cup
**25 October 2026**	**Fiji**	**36**	**22**	**Lang Park**	**Brisbane**	**41,108**	2026 World Cup
**31 October 2026**	**Cook Islands**	**66**	**6**	**North Queensland Stadium**	**Townsville**	**19,172**	2026 World Cup
**8 November 2026**	**Samoa**	**44**	**12**	**Sydney Football Stadium**	**Sydney**	**41,529**	2026 World Cup
**15 November 2026**	**New Zealand**	**32**	**12**	**Lang Park**	**Brisbane**	**52,461**	2026 World Cup

== See also ==
- Australian national rugby league team
- Rugby League World Cup
- Australian Rugby League
