= Australia national rugby league team =

Senior men's sports team

Kangaroos

Team information
- Nickname: The Kangaroos
- Governing body: Australian Rugby League Commission
- Region: Asia-Pacific
- Head coach: Kevin Walters
- Captain: Isaah Yeo
- Most caps: Darren Lockyer (59)
- Top try-scorer: Darren Lockyer (35)
- Top point-scorer: Johnathan Thurston (382)
- IRL ranking: 1st

Uniforms
First colours

Team results
- First international
- New Zealand 11–10 Australia (Agricultural Oval, Sydney, Australia; 9 May 1908)
- Biggest win
- Russia 4–110 Australia (The Boulevard, Kingston upon Hull, England; 4 November 2000)
- Biggest defeat
- New Zealand 30–0 Australia (Waikato Stadium, Hamilton, New Zealand; 4 November 2023)
- World Cup
- Appearances: 17 (first time in 1954)
- Best result: (gold) Champions (1957; 1968; 1970; 1975; 1977; 1988; 1992; 1995; 2000; 2013; 2017; 2021; 2026)

The Australian national rugby league team, commonly known as the Kangaroos, have represented Australia in senior men's rugby league football competitions since the establishment of the game in Australia in 1908. Administered by the Australian Rugby League Commission, the Kangaroos are ranked first in the IRL Men's World Rankings. The team is the most successful in Rugby League World Cup history, having won the competition 13 times, and contested 16 of the 17 finals, only failing to reach the final in the inaugural 1954 tournament. Only five nations (along with NZ Maori) have beaten Australia in test matches, and Australia has an overall win percentage of 70%.

Dating back to 1908, Australia is the fourth oldest national side after England, New Zealand and Wales. The team was first assembled in 1908 for a tour of Great Britain. The majority of the Kangaroos' games since then have been played against Great Britain and New Zealand. In the first half of the 20th century, Australia's international competition came from alternating tours to Great Britain and New Zealand. Australia played host to these teams in non-tour years. Great Britain dominated in the early years, and Australia did not win a Test against the Lions until 11 November 1911 under captain Chris McKivat. Australia did not win a series at home against Great Britain until 1920 or abroad until 1958.

Since 1908, the team has been nicknamed the Kangaroos. Initially only used when touring Great Britain and later France, this has been the official nickname of the team since 7 July 1994. In 1997 Australia was also represented by a Super League Australia team, drawing on players from that year's Super League competition.

== History ==
Rugby football has been played in Australia since the first game held in Sydney in 1870 following the formation of the Wallaroo FC, the first rugby club. Steady growth in the number of clubs resulted in 1874 in the founding of the Southern Rugby Football Union (now NSWRU) who adopted the playing laws of rugby union. In 1882 the first inter-colonial rugby union matches between NSW and Queensland commenced, and NSW made a tour of New Zealand. In 1888 the first British Lions team toured Australia, with the majority of the players coming from clubs in Yorkshire and Lancashire who in 1895 split from rugby union and formed England rugby league.

=== 1900s ===
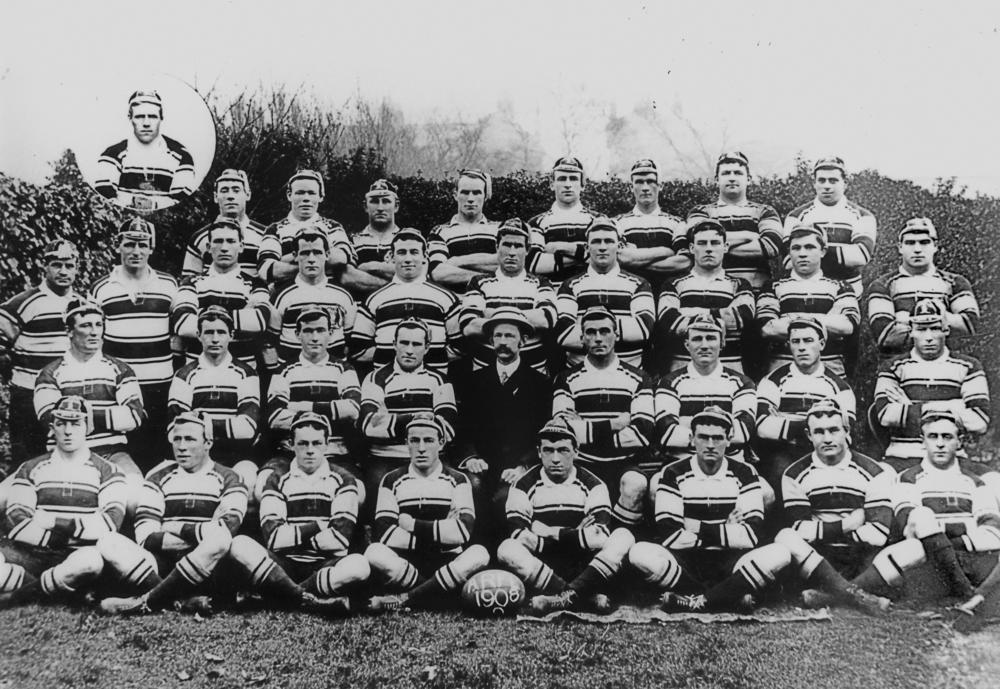
The inaugural Australia team during the nation's first tour to Great Britain in 1908

By 1907, Sydney rugby union games were attracting up to 52,000 people, the largest single attendance for any football match in the world, outside of professional soccer in England. As the sport was officially an amateur one all profits went to the NSWRU. This caused discontent among players including Herbert 'Dally' Messenger, and in 1908 the New South Wales Rugby Football League and Queensland Rugby League were formed.

An Australian national rugby league team was first formed during the first season of rugby league in Australia, the 1908 NSWRFL Premiership season. The team, which was made of players from the NSWRFL with a few Queensland rugby rebels added, first played against the "professional All Blacks" on the return leg of their tour of Australia and Great Britain.

Later that year, the Australian team arranged to go on a tour of its own. The first Kangaroos arrived in England on 27 September 1908, and played their first-ever test against the Northern Union in December in London. It finished at 22 in front of a crowd of 2,000. The second test in Newcastle in January 1909 attracted a crowd of 22,000, and the Northern Union won 15–5. The third test was played at Villa Park, Birmingham, the Northern Union winning again 6–5 before a crowd of 9,000. The Australians suggested that the series be named 'The Ashes' after the cricket series of the same name.

In 1909, when the new "Northern Union" code was still in its infancy in Australia, a match between the Kangaroos and the Wallabies was played before a crowd of around 20,000, with the Rugby League side winning 29–26.

=== 1910s ===
The first British tour of the Southern Hemisphere began on 4 June 1910, when the Northern Union played New South Wales in front of 33,000 spectators in Sydney, losing 28–14. But they won the first test in Sydney against Australia 27–20 in front of 42,000. They then won the second test in Brisbane 22–17. In Auckland, on 30 July, they defeated New Zealand 52–20. The 1910 Great Britain Lions tour of Australia and New Zealand was the first-ever, and Australia were beaten by the Ashes in two tests, faring slightly better than "Australasia" with two Kiwis added to their squad. The 1911–12 Kangaroo tour of Great Britain was undertaken by an 'Australasian' squad that included four New Zealanders. They won the Ashes for the first time, and for the next half century, no other touring team did do so on British soil.

The 1914 Great Britain Lions tour of Australia and New Zealand was the second time the British toured down under. The Australians, captained by Sid Deane for all three tests, got one victory but lost the series in the famous decider, the "Rorke's Drift Test". Australia also went on a tour of New Zealand in 1919.

=== 1920s ===
The 1920 Great Britain Lions tour saw Australia win the Ashes series for the first time on home soil. Crowds were massive, including nearly 70,000 at the first Tour match versus Sydney. The 1921–22 Kangaroo tour of Great Britain also included a New Zealander and was ostensibly an Australasian side. In January 1922, an "England" side defeated Australia 6–0 at The Willows, Salford, to win back the Ashes that had been lost in 1920. They did not lose again until 1950.

The Australian national team first wore green and gold in a hooped design on Saturday, 23 June 1928, when they met Great Britain in the first Test at the Brisbane Exhibition Ground. Britain led 10-2 after 25 minutes, 13-7 at half time, and, after a nervous second half, eventually claimed the Test 15–12. The England team won both the 1928 series in Australia and New Zealand by two tests to one. They were presented with the Ashes Trophy by the Australians, which the two countries have competed for ever since.

The 1929–30 Kangaroo tour of Great Britain was the fourth Kangaroo tour, and took the Australian team all around England and also into Wales. The tour also featured the ninth Ashes series which comprised four Test matches and was won by Great Britain.

=== 1930s ===
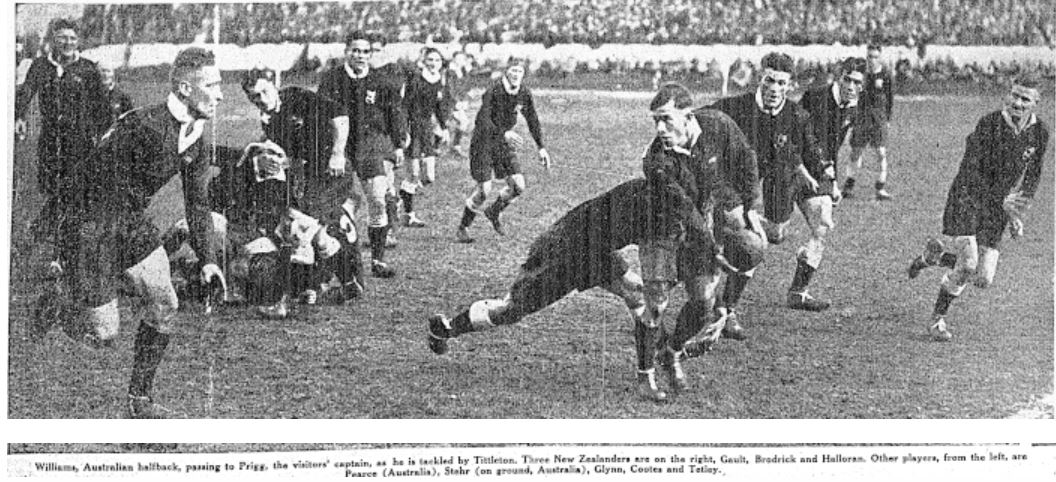
Australia versus New Zealand in Auckland, 1937

The first test of the 1932 Ashes series between Australia and Great Britain drew a world record international rugby league attendance of 70,204 to the Sydney Cricket Ground. This attendance stood as the world record until the 1992 World Cup final played at Wembley Stadium, and as of 2013 remains the record attendance for a rugby league test played in Australia. The Jim Sullivan led Lions triumphed over the Herb Steinohrt led Australians 8–6.

On the 1933–34 tour New South Wales winger Dave Brown played in 32 matches, including all 3 Tests, scoring 285 points, at the time the greatest number ever attained by an Australian player on tour.

An exhibition match between Australia and Great Britain at Paris' Stade Pershing in December 1933 inspired the beginnings of rugby league in France.

=== 1940s ===
Albert Johnston was a national selector in 1946 and coach of the national side for the 1946 first post-WWII Anglo-Australian series. Australia's 1948-49 Kangaroo tour of Great Britain and France was their seventh tour to the UK. They played the Ashes series against a side officially called Great Britain.

=== 1950s ===
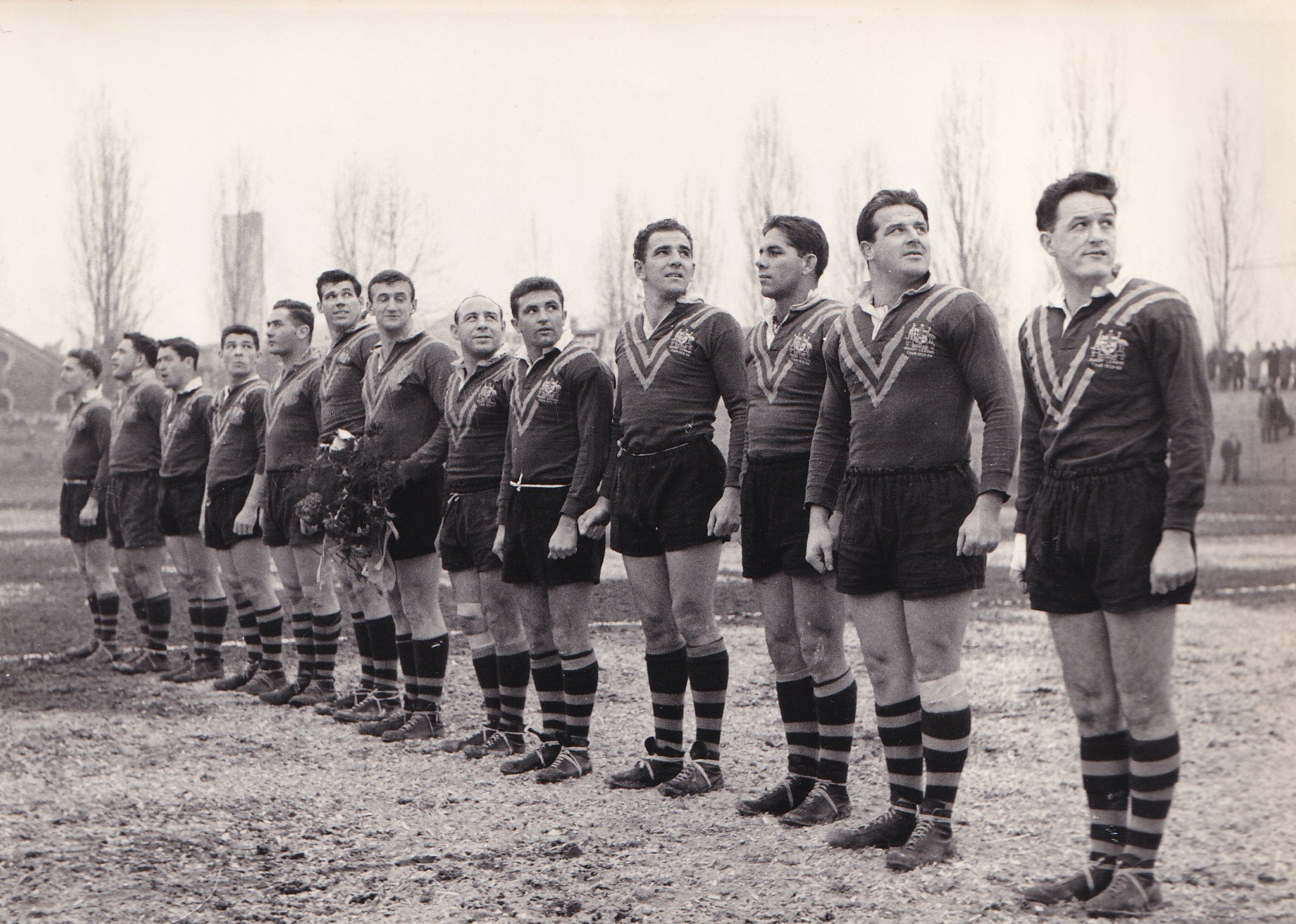
The Australian national team that played against Italy in Treviso on 24 January 1960 during 1959-60 Kangaroo Tour.

During the 1951 French rugby league tour of Australia and New Zealand, Australia lost the three-Test series to the powerful French team inspired by their freakish goal kicking fullback Puig Aubert.

The 1954 Rugby League World Cup was the first tournament held in either rugby code. Australia failed to reach the final.

For the 1956–57 Kangaroo tour a record eleven Queenslanders were selected in the touring squad. Great Britain defeated Australia 19–0 at Station Road, Swinton, to take the Ashes series 2–1.

Australia hosted and won the 1957 World Cup.

For the 1959–60 Kangaroo tour of Great Britain, the home nation retained the Ashes by winning the Test series 2–1.

=== 1960s ===
For the 1960 World Cup no final was held. Still, the last game, which was between the previously undefeated Great Britain and Australia sides, made it the tournament decider. Great Britain won 10–3.

Harry Bath was selected manager, coach and as the sole selector for the Australian national team's 1962 Ashes series.

After ten previous tours of Britain, the 1963–64 Kangaroo tour saw Australia's first ever Ashes victory on British soil. The Arthur Summons coached Kangaroos won the first test at Wembley Stadium before rampaging to a famous 50–12 win in the second test at Station Road in Swinton. Although they lost the third test at Headingley, legendary winger Ken Irvine became the first Australian player to score a try in each test of an Ashes series. The Kangaroos have not lost a series in Britain since.

Harry Bath coached the national side to World Cup glory in the 1968 World Cup. He also coached the team on a tour of New Zealand in 1969.

=== 1970s ===
The last time that Great Britain won the Ashes was in 1970. They won the series 2–1 in Australia. Out of 24 games played Great Britain won 22, drew one and lost one – making them the most successful British tourists so far. The 1970 Lions contained a galaxy of stars including captain Frank Myler, Roger Millward, Cliff Watson and Mal Reilly. Future Kangaroo Tour captain and later coach Bob Fulton made his test debut in the 1970 Ashes series (Fulton had actually played 3 games for Australia in the 1968 World Cup but at the time tests and World Cup games were classed differently). Harry Bath again coached Australia to victory in the 1970 World Cup final in a brutal game that became known as the "Battle of Headingley". Bath also coached the team on a tour of New Zealand in 1971. On that tour Geoff Starling became the youngest player to ever represent Australia. He was 18 years and 181 days old when playing a tour match against a New Zealand XIII at Huntly.

Australia lost the 1972 World Cup Final to Great Britain in controversial circumstances. Australian captain Graeme Langlands was denied what seemed a fair try by being ruled offside by the French referee after catching a kick put up by halfback Dennis Ward. Television footage of the try showed Langlands was approximately a metre behind Ward when he kicked the ball. The French referee Georges Jameau's alleged reason for not awarding the try was that he did not believe anyone could have scored it from an onside position. The World Cup final was tied at 10–10 after full-time and was still locked after extra time. Great Britain were awarded the victory due to a higher points table placing after the pool rounds of the competition. The Final was also highlighted by an 80-metre try to Lions captain, winger Clive Sullivan.

On the 1978 Kangaroo tour, Great Britain defeated Australia in the second test at Bradford, 18–14, before a crowd of 26,447. It took ten years, and fifteen consecutive test defeats before Britain could defeat the Kangaroos again, starting with Australia's 3–0 whitewash of the Lions during their 1979 Australasian tour. The Kangaroos had already won the first test 15–9 at Wigan and wrapped up the series with a 23–6 win in the third test at Headingley. However, the Australians were defeated by the French team in both tests played at the end of the 1978 tour. This was the last defeat of the Kangaroos in a series until 2005.

=== 1980s ===
The 1980s was the decade in which Australia began to truly dominate world rugby league. Along with the emergence of State of Origin football came a new crop of superstar players who led Australia throughout the 1980s. Players such as Peter Sterling, Mal Meninga, Wayne Pearce, Brett Kenny, Eric Grothe and Wally Lewis came to prominence on the 1982 Kangaroo tour of Great Britain and France. Australia's performance was taken into a new dimension by the tourists, also known as 'the Invincibles', when they became the first team to win every game of the tour (fifteen games) including the first test by 40–4 at Hull in front of 26,771 spectators. After the extremely poor showing during their 1979 Australasian tour, the Kangaroos rammed home just how far behind British football had fallen at Boothferry Park. The score was only 10–4 at half time, but after the break Australia's superior fitness showed and ran in six unanswered tries to leave the crowd and British football stunned.

In 1983, Arthur Beetson became the first Aboriginal to coach the Australian team after Frank Stanton had stood down following the Kangaroo Tour. Although Australia won the first test against New Zealand at Carlaw Park in Auckland, the Kiwis shocked by winning the return match 19–12 at Lang Park in Brisbane.

When the Lions toured in 1984, The Kangaroos again swept The Ashes series 3–0 under new team captain Wally Lewis, the first Queenslander to captain Australia since Arthur Beetson in 1974. Beetson was replaced as coach in 1984 by a returning Frank Stanton.

In 1985, Australia made a six-match tour of New Zealand under the coaching of Terry Fearnley who before the tour had coached NSW to its first ever Origin series win over Qld (the tour actually took place between games 2 and 3 of the Origin series). The Kangaroos won five of those matches, and the Test series 2–1. Australia won the first Test in Brisbane 26–20. On Sunday 30 June 1985, Australia met New Zealand in the second Test at Carlaw Park, Auckland. The Test was a 20,000 sell-out, with all tickets accounted for weeks before the match. The Kiwis dominated long periods of the game but ninety seconds from time the Kiwis lost possession close to half way. John Ribot scored a try and Australia won 10–6. The tour ended in acrimony as tensions between coach Fearley and the Qld players, led by team captain Wally Lewis, reached boiling point with Lewis publicly stating that he had caught Fearnley and team vice-captain Wayne Pearce going over team selections in Fearnley's hotel room. However, both Fearnley and Pearce denied the allegations. After the second test win Fearnley made 4 changes to the test team for the third and final test at Carlaw Park with all four players were omitted being Queenslanders. The changes proved disastrous and NZ ran out easy 18–0 winners.

Following the tour, the Australian Rugby League decided that from then on the Kangaroos coach could not also double as the incumbent coach of either NSW or Qld.

Former Kangaroo Don Furner became Australian coach in 1986 and immediately formed a good working relationship with Wally Lewis and the players. The now harmonious Australians swept New Zealand 3–0 in a mid-season test series played in Australia.

During the 1986 Kangaroo tour of Great Britain and France a then record northern hemisphere crowd of 50,383 attended the first test of the Ashes series at Old Trafford with the Walle Lewis led Australians winning 38–16. On 16 December 1986 the Kangaroos set a new record for largest-ever winning margin in a Test match at 52–0 against France. In their two Tests against France, the Australians ran in 96 points and conceded just a single penalty goal. After suffering such heavy losses, France decided to call off their proposed 1987 tour of Australia. This became the second consecutive tour of Europe in which Australia had won all their games. By the end of the tour, Terry Lamb had become the first player to appear in every match on a Kangaroo Tour. For this tour Wally Lewis, Greg Dowling, Bob Lindner, Gene Miles (Wynnum Manly) and Bryan Neibling (Redcliffe) became the last players selected to tour from the Brisbane Rugby League competition. By being named as tour captain, Wally Lewis became the first Queenslander to captain a Kangaroo Tour since Tom Gorman in 1929/30.

Australia crashed to a defeat on Tuesday 21 July 1987, when the Kangaroo dominance of the international game suffered a setback. New Zealand were their opponents in a match at Lang Park in Brisbane, which had been arranged to fill the gap created by the non-appearance of France. New Zealand won the game 13–6. The next four internationals between Australia and New Zealand were all staged in New Zealand, and all were won by the Kangaroos.

During the 1988 Great Britain Lions tour the Ashes were successfully retained by Australia by winning the first two Tests, however Great Britain won the third test 26–12 at the Sydney Football Stadium, ending a 15-game winning streak between the two teams that stretched back to the third Ashes test of 1978. Later that month, Australia's 62-point win over Papua New Guinea in the NSW country town of Wagga Wagga set a new record for largest winning margin in international rugby league. Australian dual international winger Michael O'Connor also set a new record for most points scored by an individual in international rugby league (30 points – 4 tries, 7 goals). Also in 1988, as part of the bicentenary celebrations, Australia played a one-off test match against Rest Of The World at the Sydney Football Stadium, winning the one-off test 22–10. The 1985–1988 Rugby League World Cup culminated in the World Cup final against New Zealand at Auckland's Eden Park ground (the home of NZ rugby union). Australia won a brutal World Cup final 25–12 in front of 47,363. Captain Wally Lewis broke his arm during the game.

In 1989 the Kangaroos toured New Zealand, taking a record-breaking twelve Queenslanders in the 20 man squad after Queensland's second straight 3-0 State of Origin series win over New South Wales. Don Furner had retired from coaching after the 1988 World Cup final with Manly-Warringah 1987 Sydney Rugby League premiership winning coach and 1978 Kangaroo tour captain Bob Fulton taking over from 1989. Fulton's first series in charge of the Australian team saw them sweep New Zealand 3–0 during their 1989 tour.

=== 1990s ===
The Bob Fulton coached Kangaroos played two mid-season tests in 1990. They defeated France 34–2 on a cold night in Parkes with Mal Meninga taking over the captaincy from Wally Lewis who was unavailable with a broken arm. They then played a single test against New Zealand in Wellington, winning 24–6.

With Wally Lewis controversially ruled unfit for the 1990 Kangaroo tour, his Queensland teammate Mal Meninga, making his 3rd Kangaroo Tour, retained the Australian captaincy. The Ashes got off to a bad start for the Kangaroos when Great Britain shocked Australia to win the first test 19–12 at Wembley Stadium in front of a new record home crowd of 54,567. The second test at Old Trafford in Manchester was a tight, thrilling affair that saw two of the most famous tries scored in test match football. Debutante 5/8 Cliff Lyons second half try came after the Kangaroos kept the ball alive through 13 sets of hands before winger Andrew Ettingshausen raced down the wing and centre kicked for Lyons to score. With the scores tied at 10-all going into injury time and the Kangaroos pinned just 15 metres from their line, Ricky Stuart set off on a 75-metre run before passing to Meninga winning try only seconds from full-time to give Australia a 14–10 win. The Kangaroos then wrapped up The Ashes with a comprehensive 14–0 win in the third test at Elland Road in Leeds. Meninga as captain became just the third Australian (after Ken Irvine in 1962 and 1963–64, and Sam Backo in 1988) to score a try in each test of an Ashes series.

Australia faced New Zealand in a three-game mid-season Test series in 1991. The first test, played at the Olympic Park Stadium in Melbourne (the first rugby league test played in Australia outside of NSW or Qld) saw the Kiwis again defeat Australia after a successful Kangaroo tour. NZ won the first test 24–8 in Melbourne in front of 26,900 fans, however a new look Australian side came back to win the second test 44–0 in Sydney and the third test 40–12 in Brisbane. At the end of the 1991 NSWRL season, the Kangaroos embarked on their first (and as of 2017 only) tour of Papua New Guinea, winning all five games on tour including easily both tests against the Papua New Guinea Kumuls.

During the 1992 Great Britain Lions tour of Australasia, the British lost the first test 22–6 in Sydney before stunning the Australians when they easily won the 2nd Ashes test 33–10 at Princes Park in Melbourne, but lost the 3rd test 16–10 in Brisbane. The 1992 Rugby League World Cup final at Wembley Stadium set a then international attendance record for a rugby league international of 73,631. The Bob Fulton coached, Mal Meninga captained Australians defeat Great Britain 10–6 to win their 7th Rugby League World Cup title. The WCF was a tight game with the Lions leading 6–4 with less than 20 minutes remaining before an on debut Steve Renouf crossed for the only try of the game and along with Meninga's sideline conversion gave the Kangaroos a famous victory.

Australia again played a mid-season test series against New Zealand in 1993. The first test at the Mt Smart Stadium in Auckland ended in a 14-all draw thanks to a late Laurie Daley field goal. Daley had captained Australia for the first time in the match following a two-game suspension to Mal Meninga. The Kangaroos then won the second test 16–8 at the very wet Palmerston North Showgrounds before wrapping up the series with a 16–4 win at Lang Park in Brisbane.

On 4 July 1994, Australia defeated France 58–0 at the Parramatta Stadium in Sydney, their only test on home soil for the year. The 1994 Kangaroo Tour was the last time the Australian national team played matches against British provincial teams, in addition to the Tests. Australia continued its dominance, winning both Test series against Great Britain and France, suffering only one loss (again, against Great Britain in the First Test at Wembley), and remained undefeated against British club outfits in a streak stretching back to 1978. Australia adopted the name 'Kangaroos' for the July test against France, since then the team has been officially known by this name. The 1994 Kangaroo tour was also the first (and only) time that the traditional Australian test kit was only worn during test matches. For the tour games, including the friendly against Wales in Cardiff (the first time Australia had played Wales in 12 years), the Kangaroos wore jumpers that had increasing thickness gold hoops underneath the twin gold chevrons.

The Australian team that contested and won the 1995 Rugby League World Cup consisted only of players from clubs that remained loyal to the Australian Rugby League during the Super League war. This meant several Super League-aligned clubs that were already well-established internationals were not selected for the World Cup squad. During 1995, the Kangaroos defeated New Zealand 3–0 in the Trans-Tasman Test series played in Australia. As they were for the World Cup, only ARL loyal players were selected for Australia which saw several players, including Steve Menzies, Mark Coyne, Terry Hill, Gary Larson, Trevor Gillmeister and Jason Smith make their test debuts during the New Zealand series. Despite having what many described as a second string side without players such as Laurie Daley, Allan Langer, Andrew Ettingshausen, Brett Mullins, Glenn Lazarus, Bradley Clyde, Ian Roberts, Ricky Stuart and Steve Walters, Bob Fulton's Kangaroos won their 8th World Cup (and 5th in a row) when they defeated England 16–8 in the World Cup final in front of 66,540 fans at Wembley. The star of the day for Australia was halfback/hooker Andrew Johns.

In 1997 also, due to the Super League war, Australian rugby league was split down the middle by two competitions: the ARL's Optus Cup and Super League's Telstra Cup. As a result, that season there were also two Australian sides.

Great Britain played a home three-Test series against the Australian Super League Test team in 1997 and lost 2–1. The three matches played have been given test status by the UK's Rugby Football League. The Australian Rugby League has decided not to recognise the matches of its rival as tests since the Super League war ended and does not consider the series to be a genuine Ashes contest. Super League's Anzac Test concept, which is an early season one-off test match against New Zealand was retained and has been played annual ever since.

The 1998 Kangaroo Tour was cancelled because of the Super League war. With the Super League war finally over in 1998, Great Britain travelled to the Southern Hemisphere for the first Rugby League Tri-Nations tournament with Australia and New Zealand in 1999.

Chris Anderson took over from Wayne Bennett as coach of the team in March 1999.

=== 2000s ===
The new millennium started with the 2000 World Cup which Australia won.

In 2001 the Australians arrived in Britain for the first Ashes series since 1994. Great Britain surprised everyone by winning the first test, but lost the next two.

In July 2002, Australia handed Great Britain their worst ever test defeat by defeating them 64–10 in a Sydney test match.

In 2003 the New Zealand Rugby League counted its 100th international match against Australia, because they take World Cup matches and Super League tests into account.

In November 2003, Great Britain lost an Ashes series 0–3 on home soil. The margin was extremely small in each game, 22–18 in game 1, 23–20 in game 2 and 18–12 in game 3 and it was known as Brett Kimmorley's greatest series as he orchestrated Australia's last minute victories. However, the dominance of the Australian team over the last generation has begun to slip since 2003.

In 2003 and 2005 New Zealand won the Bill Kelly Memorial Trophy from Australia. Australia won the first two Rugby League Tri-Nations competitions in 1999 and 2004, before being defeated by New Zealand in the final of the 2005 competition on 26 November 2005. Before that defeat Australia had not lost a Test series since December 1978, when they were defeated by France in both Test matches. On 4 November 2006, Australia lost to Great Britain 23–12 . It was a huge upset, and the first time since 1988 that the Kangaroos had been beaten by Great Britain in Sydney. The match was Australia's 3rd match of the 2006 Tri-Nations series, having already secured a place in the final with two wins against New Zealand earlier in the tournament 30–18 and 20–15. The Australian side reclaimed the title of Tri-Nations champions on 25 November with a victory over the New Zealand side in the final by 16–12 with a try in the second period of extra time by captain Darren Lockyer.

In 2007 Australia played two test matches, both against New Zealand and both emphatic victories. The first 30–6 and the second 58–0.

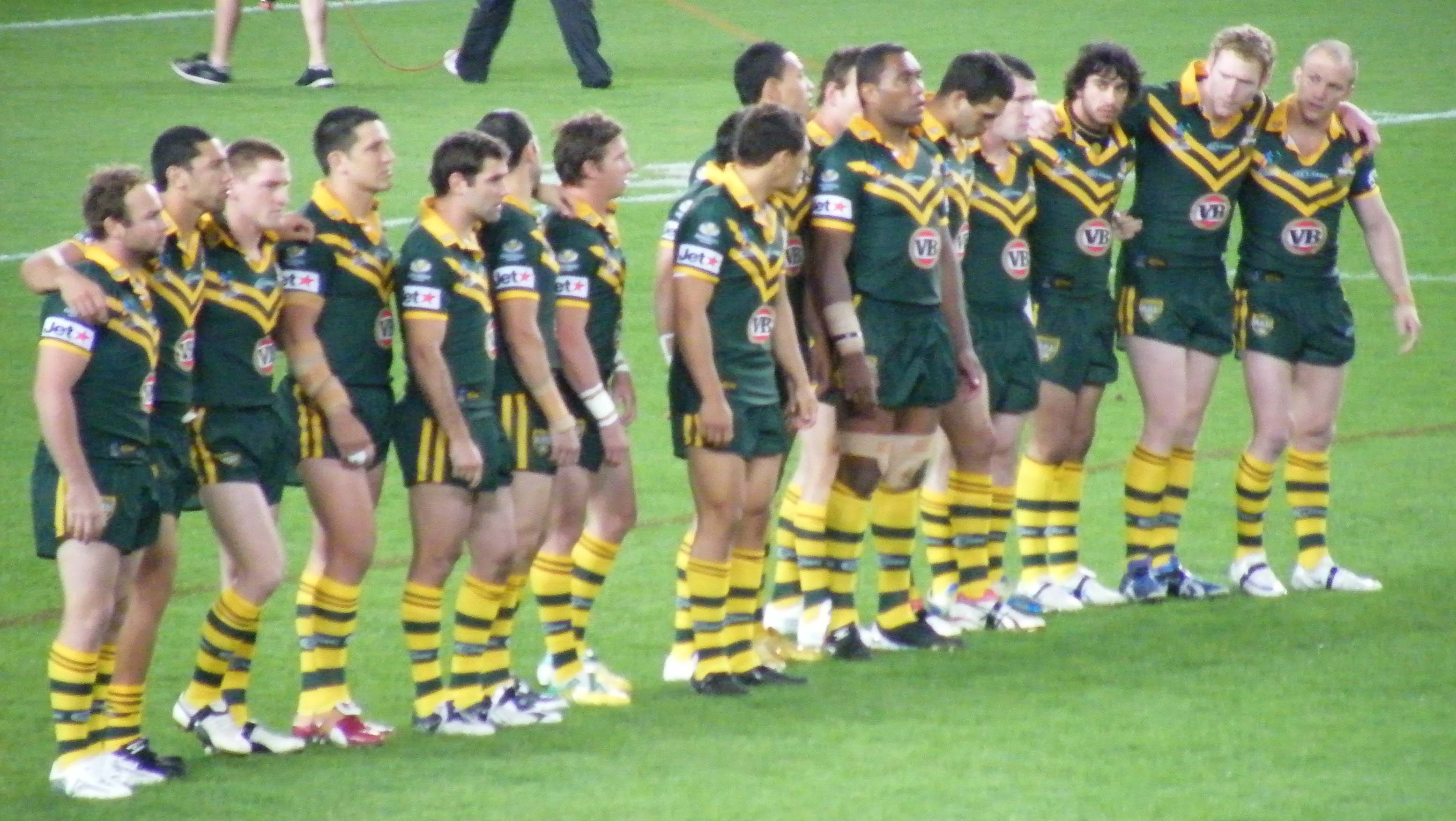
Australia line up to face the New Zealand haka at the opening match of 2008 World Cup in Sydney

Australia hosted the 2008 World Cup and did not have to qualify. They did not lose a match until the final, which they lost to New Zealand 34–20, who became world champions for the first time. Following this loss, Ricky Stuart was replaced as coach by Tim Sheens, then the most experienced NRL coach.

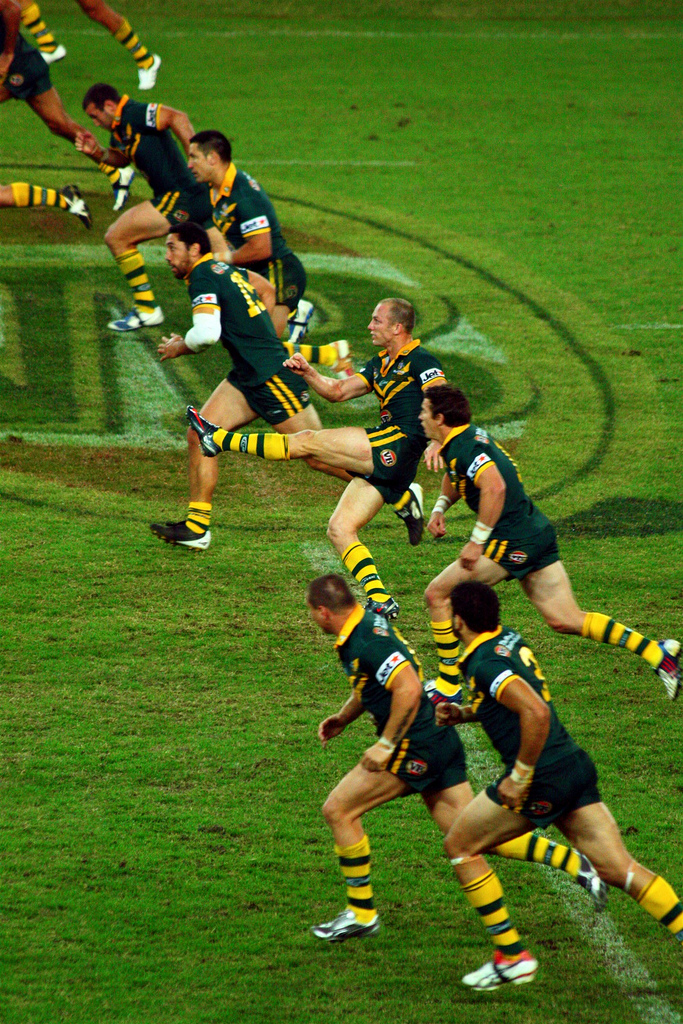
Australia kicking off the 2009 Anzac Test in Brisbane

Tim Sheens' first match as Australian coach was against New Zealand 2009 Anzac Test. In this match Sheen's side included a record-equalling ten Queensland representatives, including an all maroon backline and front row, reflecting the state's dominance in the annual State of Origin series. All of the points were also scored by Queenslanders in the 38–10 victory. Later that year Australia traveled up to play in the inaugural Four Nations tournament. The Kangaroos advanced to the final after a draw against New Zealand, and wins over co-hosts England and France. Australia took on the English in the final and despite at one point trailing 14–16, a dominant last quarter of the game saw Australia win the inaugural Four Nations tournament. Captain Darren Lockyer also reached a milestone in this match after becoming the first Australian to make 50 appearances for his country.

=== 2010s ===
Australia began 2010 with a 4-point win in the Anzac Test that symbolised the opening of the new stadium in Melbourne: AAMI Park. After the 2010 domestic season the major international tournament was the 2010 Four Nations held in Australia and New Zealand. In Australia's opening match against Papua New Guinea, captain Darren Lockyer surpassed Ken Irvine's record for most test tries for Australia, scoring his 34th. Australia won all of their matches comfortably to advance to the final to have a 2008 World Cup final re-match against New Zealand at Suncorp Stadium. The Kiwis won the game 16–12, and 2010 Four Nations title, after a try in the final seconds of the match.

Australia gained revenge over the Kiwis after another Anzac Test win, retaining the Bill Kelly Memorial Trophy in the process with a 10-point win on the Gold Coast. Later in that year Australia played a test-match against New Zealand, 12 days before the 2011 Four Nations kicked off, at the newly reconstructed Ausgrid Stadium in Newcastle. Australia thrashed the Kiwis by 36 points in front of a record crowd. Darren Lockyer became the most capped International player of all-time after surpassing New Zealand international Ruben Wiki's record of 55 appearances for his country. Australia took on New Zealand again in the opening game of the Four Nations, held in England and Wales. The Australians yet again beat their trans-tasman rivals. They then went on to beat England at Wembley and were surprised in their final round-robin fixture after Wales were leading 8–0 after 13 minutes and were behind Australia by only 10 points at the break. But Sheens' men thrashed the Welsh to easily advance to another final meeting with England. After being tied with the English at one point in the second half, Australia went on to win the game by 22 points.

In 2012, the Anzac Test was held in New Zealand for the first time since 1998, which was the Kiwis last win in the fixture. Home advantage made no difference for the Kiwis as Sheens' Kangaroos won the match by eight points. The Kangaroos took on the Kiwis one more time later in the year, this time in Townsville. In front of a sold-out crowd, the Kangaroos won the test-match with another eight point victory. There was no tournament this year because there was a World Cup next year for the teams to prepare for.

Australia began the 2013 International season by retaining the Bill Kelly Memorial Trophy after another Anzac Test win. At the end of the year, Australia traveled up to play in the 2013 World Cup co-hosted by England and Wales. In their opening game against England, the Kangaroos faced a 0–10 scoreline after twenty minutes. But Australia went on to regain the control and go on to win the match by eight points. The England match was Australia's only 'scare' in the tournament as the Kangaroos went on to win and dominate all of their remaining matches, recording a 244–4 total aggregate score. They went on to earn revenge for their defeat to New Zealand five years ago in the World Cup final to beat them this time around at the same stage. The final was watched in front of a record International rugby league attendance of 74,468. In the match, five-eighth, Johnathan Thurston broke Mick Cronin's 31-year record of top point scorer after a conversion took him past the previous record of 309 points. This was the Kangaroos' tenth World Cup title. After the England game, Australia recorded five successive games without conceding a try in the tournament. This feat was one game off equaling the 1981–82 Australian team's record.

Australia could not equal that feat despite another Anzac Test win in 2014. Later that year, Australia co-hosted the 2014 Four Nations with New Zealand. They took on the Kiwis in the second of the double-header clashes at Suncorp Stadium. However Australia's record against the Kiwis at the venue continued to be a negative one after another defeat made it three defeats in the past four meetings at the 'Cauldron'. This meant Australia were facing England in a must win game at AAMI Park in Melbourne. With many regulars missing, Sheens had to make decisions like naming an 18-year old in the team, who'd become the youngest player to play for Australia. Sione Mata'utia, aged 18 years and 129 days, eclipsed the previous record held by Israel Folau, since 2007, by 65 days when he played on debut for Australia against the 'Poms'. The match was headlined with controversy. In the last minute of the game, England put a grubber kick in the in-goal area, since they were desperate for a try as they were trailing by just four points. Australian fullback Greg Inglis had to force the ball dead due to incoming England attack but the video referees wanted to have another look and see whether or not it was Inglis or the incoming English winger Ryan Hall got the last touch on the ball. On the slow-motion replays it showed that Ryan Hall's right hand's little finger had put some downward pressure on the ball however in normal speed it was deemed 'inconclusive' by Australian officiating rules and therefore a NO TRY was given to the frustration of the English players and supporters but respect from Sheens and his Australian players. Had the try been awarded and England converted, it would have been Australia's first defeat to England since 1995, the first time they suffered back-to-back home defeats since 1970 and the first time they failed to qualify for a tournament final since 1954. In their final round-robin fixture they dominated proceedings against the Samoans, who had been causing trouble for England and New Zealand in the tournament, to advance to the final which was held in New Zealand. However they could not get revenge for their defeat earlier in the tournament as Australia lost 18–22.

The 2015 Anzac Test was held in Suncorp Stadium. The Australian team's horrible record in Brisbane against the Kiwis continued as they suffered another defeat and records continued to be made for the New Zealand team. This was the first time they beat Australia for three consecutive test-matches since 1953 and the first time they won the Anzac Test since 1998. Australia did not play another test-match that year. After the match Sheens was facing scrutiny from the media after many believed it was time for the old players he fielded to move on since the much younger Kiwis side had beaten them on the past three occasions. Australia also dropped down to number 2 on the RLIF World Rankings, which added further scrutiny. At the end of the year, Sheens was unable to cope with the pressure of the media, despite wanting to coach the team at the 2017 World Cup. He took up an advisory role with English domestic club Salford Red Devils and therefore resigned as coach of the Australian national team.

In December 2015, successful Queensland Maroons coach Mal Meninga announced he'd leave his role as the coach of the Queensland representative side to coach the Australian national team. Before his appointment Mal announced his ambitions that he wanted the International game to become the pinnacle of rugby league like it was in his playing days.

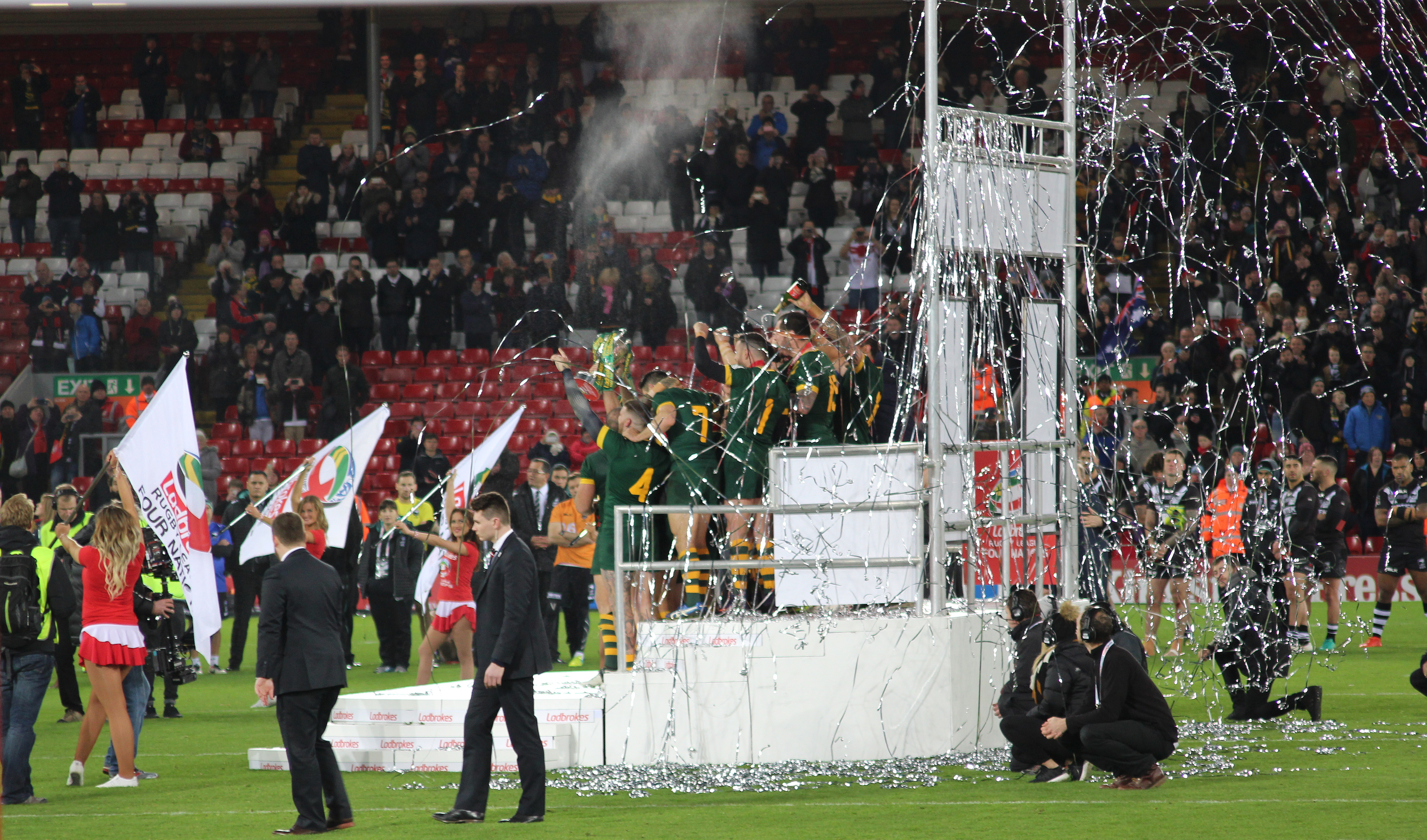
Australia celebrating their 2016 Four Nations title at Anfield

Mal Meninga's first game in charge as Australian coach was the 2016 Anzac Test. Before the test, Meninga stirred controversy around the rugby league world after selecting Fijian born player Semi Radradra, who is eligible due to living in Australia for three years, in his team over other 'homegrown' Australian players. Radradra, who represented Fiji at the 2013 World Cup, still had a Fijian passport at that time and this brought up the question of changing eligibility rules in International rugby league. Meninga's selection questioned the ambition he raised of wanting to make the International game the pinnacle of the sport. Australia won the test-match 16–0 and in the process ended their losing-run against the Kiwis. They also held New Zealand scoreless in a test-match for the first time since 2007. But despite the result Australia suffered criticism with commentator Phil Gould saying the Australian team is 'too old' and are 'kidding themselves if they think they'll win the World Cup next year'. He believes Australia should've put much more points on a 'weakened' New Zealand team missing many regular players through various reasons. Meninga hit back saying 'That was a real test-match. That's what test footy is. People who have never played it don't know what it is.' At the conclusion of the 2016 domestic season, Australia took on New Zealand in Perth in what was the first ever test-match in Western Australia. Meninga's men then began their 2016 Four Nations campaign with comfortable 42-point win over Scotland, in the first ever meeting between the two countries. After a tough encounter with New Zealand, and a convincing win over England, Australia met their Trans-Tasman rivals once again in the final. Meninga's Roos made the final tournament match look easy, as the Kangaroos dominated their opponents with a 26-point victory, claiming their third tournament title in the process.

In the last ever scheduled Anzac Test, captain Cameron Smith became just the second player to play 50 tests for Australia, behind former captain, and record cap holder, Darren Lockyer. He became the first Australian to wear the gold chevron on his shoulder after a new initiative created by Meninga last year. Other players are also honoured, with players that have earned 20+ caps wearing a white chevron, 30+ wearing a bronze chevron, and 40+ wearing a silver chevron on their shoulder. If a player beats Lockyer's record for the most appearances, they will wear a 'special purple' commemorative jersey. Australia won the final Anzac test-match by a convincing scoreline of 30–12. Later in the year, countries were preparing for the grandest stage in the international game, the World Cup. However, the biggest talking point wasn't about whether Australia would defend their title. It was around Tonga, after many players of Tongan heritage, had quit the opportunity to represent the New Zealand squad in order to play for Tonga. Regular Australian prop forward, Andrew Fifita, also followed suit, after initially being announced in Meninga's squad, to the disapproval of Australian halfback Cooper Cronk. Meninga, however, also voiced his opinion saying he had no issue with Fifita's decision, as it was great for Tonga, and the international game. After conceding early, Australia went on to grit out a tough victory over England. The Kangaroos then went on to beat a spirited French team, in a game which saw Wade Graham became the seventh player to equal the record of four tries in a World Cup game, and only the second Australian forward to score four tries in a single game, since Gorden Tallis in 2000. Australia finished off their pool stage games, with a comprehensive victory over a gallant Lebanese outfit. Australia then advanced past Samoa to the semi-finals with ease, thanks to a record-breaking five tries in a single World Cup match from Valentine Holmes. Holmes then remarkably beat his own record a week later, in the semi-finals against Fiji. With the six tries, he surpassed former Kangaroo, Wendell Sailor's, record for most tries in a single World Cup tournament, held since 2000. In the final, Australia took on England for the first time in 22 years, after facing New Zealand for three consecutive editions. The Kangaroos went on to retain the World Cup at Lang Park in Brisbane, the venue, at which they lost the World Cup final, when the tournament was last held in Australia. Australia also became the first team to win 11 World Cup crowns. The final score of 6–0, made this the lowest scoring World Cup final in the history of the tournament. This was also the first time that a country had won the competition on home soil in 40 years.

On 20 October 2018, for the first time in history, Australia played a Test match against Tonga. In front of a sold-out crowd at Mt. Smart Stadium in Auckland, the Kangaroos withstood a spirited challenge from the Mate Ma'a to win 34–16.

On 2 November 2019 in front of 25,257, Tonga beat Australia for the first time in their history, which marked the first time Australia had lost to a Tier 2 side since the system came in and the first time they'd lost to a team which wasn't New Zealand, Great Britain or England since 1978.

=== 2020s ===
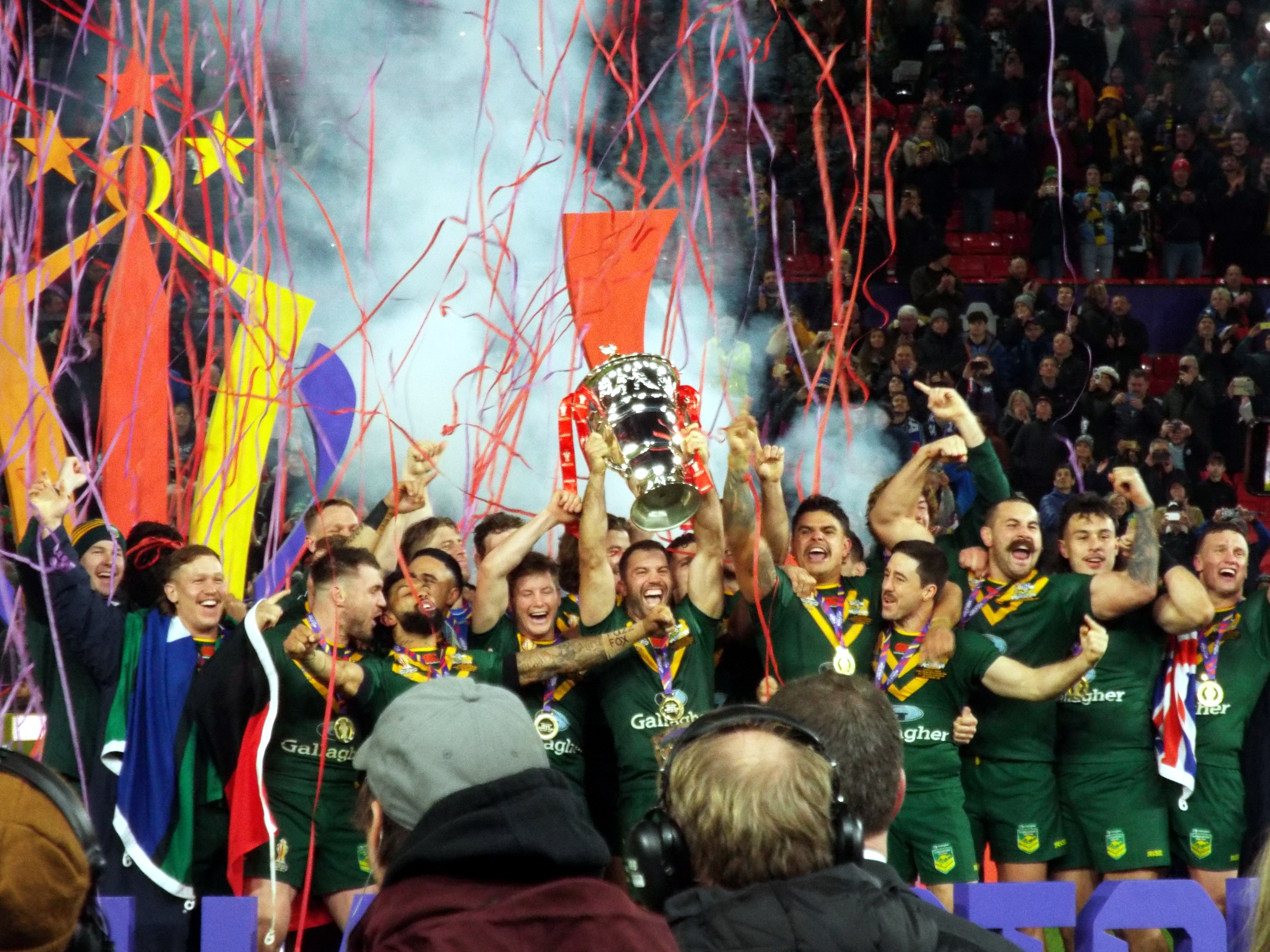
Australia lifting their 12th World Cup after defeating Samoa in the final at Old Trafford

Due to the COVID-19 pandemic, the 2021 Rugby League World Cup was delayed until the end of 2022. Throughout 2022, several NRL players with international heritage opting to play for their home nation during the World Cup, including Jarome Luai, Brian To'o and Joseph Sua’ali’i for Samoa, Felise Kafusi for Tonga, and Viliame Kikau, Apisai Koroisau, and Maika Sivo for Fiji. Mal Meninga named his 24-man squad on 5 October, with James Tedesco named as captain after previously playing for Italy in the 2017 World Cup.

The campaign kicked off against Fiji at Headingley Stadium, winning 42–8, with debutants Jeremiah Nanai, Angus Crichton, and Harry Grant crossing for tries, Josh Addo-Carr getting a double, and Cameron Munster winning man of the match. The Kangaroos then crushed a hapless Scotland side 84–0 at Coventry Building Society Arena, with Addo-Carr scoring four tries, including a last-minute try off a no-look between the legs flick from Addo-Carr's Bulldogs teammate Matt Burton. Burton, Nathan Cleary, Isaah Yeo and Campbell Graham all scored tries on debut, with Addo-Carr also receiving man of the match. Meninga named his squad for Australia on 27 October, pairing together Cleary and Daly-Cherry Evans in the halves. The two had been in contention to be Meninga's first-choice halfback. Australia then went on to beat Italy 66–6 at Totally Wicked Stadium, with Tedesco scoring a try against his former team and Campbell Graham scoring a double. Australia entered the knockout stages beating Lebanon 48–4, setting up a closely fought 16–14 semi-final victory over New Zealand at Elland Road. Australia defeated Samoa 30–10 in the final, winning their 12th World Cup title in the process.

In 2023, Australia participated in the 2023 Pacific Championships alongside New Zealand and Samoa. Despite winning both group stage games, 38–12 against Samoa and 36–18 against New Zealand, a 30–0 loss to the Kiwis in the final at Waikato Stadium would see New Zealand win the title. This match was the Kangaroos' largest ever defeat and the first time held scoreless since 2005.

In 2024, Australia participated in the 2024 Pacific Championships against New Zealand and Tonga. Following group stage wins against Tonga 18–0 and New Zealand 22–10, Australia went onto win the Pacific Cup at Western Sydney Stadium, defeating Tonga 20–14 in the final.

Australia lifting their 13th World Cup after defeating New Zealand in the final at Lang Park

In 2025, Mal Meninga departed the head coaching position upon joining the Perth Bears after nine years at the helm, which saw Kevin Walters take his place. Ahead of the 2025 Ashes, Walters suggested that the Australian Rugby League Commission had become more open to selecting overseas based players, with several "under consideration" for future tournaments. This coming after every Australia squad in recent years had been selected entirely from the NRL, however Walters stated that this was by convention and there is no formal rule preventing overseas selection. The Kangaroos went onto win this Ashes series 3–0, marking the series' return after 22 years.

In 2026, Australia hosted the 2026 Rugby League World Cup, with a few matches in Papua New Guinea and New Zealand. Australia dominated Pool A, defeating New Zealand in the tournament opener 24–22 before wins against Fiji 36–22 and Cook Islands 66–6. In the semi-final, Australia defeated Samoa 44–12, setting up a final rematch against New Zealand. The Kangaroos would win this 32–12 at Lang Park, marking a thirteenth World Cup triumph, and fourth in a row.

== Culture ==
=== War cry ===
From 1908 to 1967, the Australian team performed a war cry before Tests played in Great Britain and France. The war cry was first performed when the Kangaroos arrived at Tilbury Docks near London. It was developed after war cries had been performed on tours of Britain by the New Zealand All Blacks in 1905, the South African Springboks in 1906 and the New Zealand All Golds in 1907. It is believed that the war cry is derived from an indigenous chant on Stradbroke Island, Queensland, Australia.

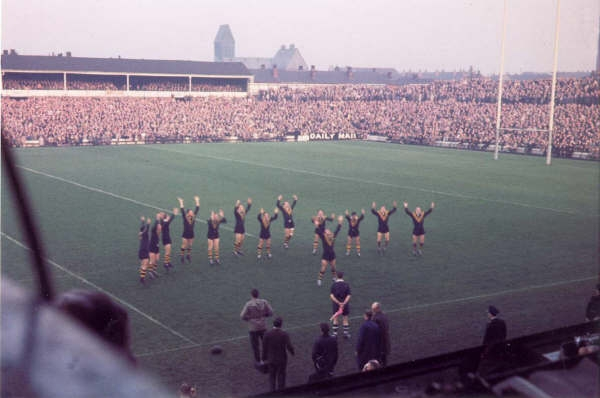
The Kangaroos performing the war cry prior to the test against Great Britain in 1963 at Station Road.

Lyrics	English translation
Wallee Mullalra Choomooroo Tingal Nah! Nah! Nah! Nah! Cannai, Barrang, Warrang, Warrang Yallah, Yallah, Yallah, Yallah, Ah! Jaleeba, Booga, Boorooloong Yarnah meei, meei, meei Meeyarra, Meeyarra, Jeeleeba, Cahwoon, Cooeewah, Cooeewah, Wahh, Wooh.	We are a race of fighters, descended from the War Gods- Beware! Beware! Beware! Beware! Where we fight there will be great bloodshed- Go! Go! Go! Go! We are powerful, but merciful. Are you friends? Good! Good! The Kangaroo is dangerous when at bay. Come on. Come on, Death.

The war cry was performed for the first time in over 40 years before the Rugby League World Cup exhibition game between the Indigenous Dreamtime Team and the New Zealand Māori in 2008.

=== Supporters ===
The main supporter group of the Australian national team is called the Roo Crew.

== Coaches ==
The current coach of the Australian team is Kevin Walters, who was appointed coach in mid 2025 after the resignation of Mal Meninga who coached the team from 2016 to 2024.

Bob Fulton has coached the most matches with 40 starting in 1989 and finishing in 1998. Jack Gibson, despite never having coached at international level, was named coach of the Australian rugby league team of the century (1908–2008).

- Albert Johnston 1946
- Col Maxwell 1948–1949
- Len Smith 1949
- Keith Froome 1949
- Vic Hey 1950–1951, 1954–1955
- Clive Churchill 1952–1953, 1959–60, 1963
- Ken Kearney 1956–1957
- Herbert Poole 1957
- Norm Robinson 1958
- Keith Barnes 1960
- Brian Carlson 1961
- Harry Bath 1962, 1968–1972
- Arthur Summons 1963–1964, 1970
- Reg Gasnier 1964, 1967–1968
- Ian Walsh 1965–1966
- Graeme Langlands 1973–1975
- Terry Fearnley 1977, 1985
- Frank Stanton 1978–1982, 1984
- Arthur Beetson 1983
- Don Furner 1986–1988
- Bob Fulton 1989–1998
- John Lang 1997 (Super League)
- Wayne Bennett 1998, 2004–2005
- Chris Anderson 1999–2003
- Ricky Stuart 2006–2008
- Tim Sheens 2009–2015
- Mal Meninga 2016–2024
- Kevin Walters 2025–

== Players ==
=== Current squad ===
The Australian Kangaroos squad for the 2026 Rugby League World Cup. The squad was announced on 5 October 2026. Isaah Yeo was appointed captain.

Jersey numbers in the table reflect the team selection for the Final against New Zealand.

Statistics in this table are compiled from the website, Rugby League Project.

J#	Player	Age	Position(s)	Kangaroos						Club	NRL Matches	Other Reps
J#	Player	Age	Position(s)	Dbt	M	T	G	F	P	Club	NRL Matches	Other Reps
1	Reece Walsh	24	Fullback	2025	7	9	5	0	46	Brisbane Broncos	111	6
2	Jack Bostock	23	Wing, Centre	2026	5	9	0	0	36	Dolphins (NRL)	55	1
3	Kotoni Staggs	25	Centre	2023	11	3	5	0	22	Brisbane Broncos	166	2 1 3 2
4	Bradman Best	25	Centre	2026	4	2	0	0	8	Newcastle Knights	122	3 1
5	Tom Trbojevic	30	Wing, Fullback	2017	12	15	0	0	60	Manly Warringah Sea Eagles	184	10 1
6	Cameron Munster	30	Five-eighth	2017	19	5	15	0	50	Melbourne Storm	255	24
7	Tom Dearden	25	Halfback, Five-eighth	2024	11	2	0	0	8	North Queensland Cowboys	140	7 1
8	Patrick Carrigan	26	Prop, Lock	2022	19	0	0	0	0	Brisbane Broncos	148	13
9	Harry Grant	26	Hooker	2022	18	3	0	0	12	Melbourne Storm	141	17
10	Tino Fa'asuamaleaui	24	Prop	2022	15	3	0	0	12	Gold Coast Titans	132	1 18 3
11	Jacob Preston	25	Second-row	2026	5	3	0	0	12	Canterbury-Bankstown Bulldogs	80
12	Liam Martin	27	Second-row	2022	11	5	0	0	20	Penrith Panthers	164	16
13	Isaah Yeo	32	Lock	2022	17	2	0	0	8	Penrith Panthers	285	20 1
14	Ethan Strange	22	Five-eighth	2026	2	0	1	0	2	Canberra Raiders	67	3 1
15	Keaon Koloamatangi	28	Prop, Second-row	2025	8	0	0	0	0	South Sydney Rabbitohs	151	11 1 1
16	Cameron Murray	26	Lock, Second-row	2019	14	7	0	0	28	South Sydney Rabbitohs	182	18 1
17	Reuben Cotter	25	Second-row, Prop	2022	16	0	0	0	0	North Queensland Cowboys	122	13 2 1
18	Latrell Mitchell	29	Centre, Fullback	2018	10	5	6	0	32	South Sydney Rabbitohs	194	11 6
19	Sam Walker	24	Halfback	2026	1	1	6	0	16	Sydney Roosters	108	3 1
20	Blayke Brailey	28	Hooker	2026	1	0	0	0	0	Cronulla-Sutherland Sharks	185	2
21	Lindsay Smith	26	Prop	2024	3	0	0	0	0	Penrith Panthers	105
22	James Tedesco	33	Fullback	2018	15	9	0	0	36	Sydney Roosters	296	6 26 2 2
–	David Fifita	26	Second-row	2026	1	0	0	0	0	South Sydney Rabbitohs	296	8 4 2+
IJ	Mitchell Moses	32	Halfback	2024	4	1	0	0	4	Parramatta Eels	257	8 8 1 3
IJ	Lindsay Collins	28	Prop	2022	12	4	0	0	16	Sydney Roosters	149	17

Notes:

- A bold number in the NRL Matches column indicates that the player has played all their NRL appearances at their current club.
- Five members of the squad have previously played for other nations:
  - Lebanon: Mitchell Moses (2017 and 2022).
  - Tonga: Keaon Koloamatangi (2022 to 2024); Kotoni Staggs (2019 and 2022) and Tonga Invitational (2019)
  - Samoa: Tino Fa'asuamaleaui (2019)
  - Italy: James Tedesco (2013, 2017)
- Three shadow players were announced: Thomas Jenkins (Panthers), Hamish Stewart (Dragons), and Ethan Strange (Raiders).

== Records ==
- **Bold**- denotes that the player is still active.

=== Most capped players ===
#	Name	Career	Caps
1	Darren Lockyer	1998–2011	59
2	Cameron Smith	2006–2017	56
3	Mal Meninga	1982–1994	46
4	Graeme Langlands	1963–1975	45
4	Petero Civoniceva	2001–2011	45
6	Brad Fittler	1991–1995, 1998–2001	40
7	Reg Gasnier	1959–1967	39
7	Johnny Raper	1959–1968	39
7	Greg Inglis	2006–2016	39
10	Johnathan Thurston	2006–2009, 2011–2017	38
10	Cooper Cronk	2007, 2009–2017	38

=== Top try scorers ===
#	Name	Career	Tries
1	Darren Lockyer	1998–2011	35
2	Ken Irvine	1959–1967	33
3	Greg Inglis	2006–2016	31
4	Reg Gasnier	1959–1967	28
5	Billy Slater	2008–2014, 2017	27
6	Bob Fulton	1968–1975, 1978	25
7	Brett Morris	2009–2014	23
8	Mal Meninga	1982–1994	21
9	Graeme Langlands	1963–1975	20
9	Valentine Holmes	2016-2023	20

=== Top points scorers ===
#	Name	Career	Points	Tries	Goals	Field Goals
1	Johnathan Thurston	2006–2017	382	13	165	0
2	Mick Cronin	1973–1982	308	10	139	0
3	Mal Meninga	1982–1994	278	21	99	0
4	Andrew Johns	1995, 1998–2006	226	12	89	0
5	Graeme Langlands	1963–1975	206	20	73	0
6	Darren Lockyer	1998–2011	204	35	31	2
7	Michael O'Connor	1986–1990	198	17	65	0
8	Cameron Smith	2006–2017	170	9	67	0
9	Mat Rogers	1998–2000	168	9	66	0

=== Team records ===
- Biggest win:

110–4 v. Russia (at The Boulevard, 4 November 2000)

- Biggest loss:

30–0 v. New Zealand (at FMG Stadium Waikato, 4 November 2023)

- Highest all–time attendance:

74,468 v. New Zealand (at Old Trafford, 30 November 2013)

=== Individual ===
- Most tries in a match:

- 6:

Valentine Holmes v. Fiji (24 November 2017)

- Most points in a match:

- 46:

Ryan Girdler v. Russia (at The Boulevard, 4 November 2000)

- Youngest player:

- 18 years 129 days:

Sione Mata'utia v. England (2 November 2014)

=== Team of the Century (1908–2008) ===
As Australian rugby league celebrated its first centenary in 2008, an Australian team of the century was named which comprises one player for each of the thirteen positions plus four interchange players: Winger Brian Bevan is the only player in the team who never represented Australia in a test match, while coach Jack Gibson never coached the Australian test team.

No.

Position
Player

1 Clive Churchill – FB 2 Brian Bevan – WG 3 Reg Gasnier – CE 4 Mal Meninga – CE 5 Ken Irvine – WG 6 Wally Lewis – FE 7 Andrew Johns – HB 8 Arthur Beetson – PR 9 Noel Kelly – HK

No.

Position
Player

10 Duncan Hall – PR 11 Norm Provan – SR 12 Ron Coote – SR 13 Johnny Raper – LK 14 Graeme Langlands – positions 15 Dally Messenger – positions 16 Bob Fulton – positions 17 Frank Burge – positions CO Jack Gibson – positions

=== Captains ===
- Arthur Hennessy (1908)
- Denis Lutge (1908)
- Alex Burdon (1909)
- Dally Messenger (1908–1910)
- Larry O'Malley (1909)
- Robert Graves (1909)
- Bill Heidke (1910)
- Chris McKivat (1910–1912)
- Sid Deane (1914)
- Arthur Halloway (1919)
- Albert "Rick" Johnston (1919–1920)
- Herb Gilbert (1920)
- Charles "Chook" Fraser (1921–1922)
- Jim Craig (1924)
- Tom Gorman (1928–1930)
- Herb Steinohrt (1932)
- Frank McMillan (1933)
- Peter "Mick" Madsen (1933)
- Dave Brown (1935–1936)
- Wally Prigg (1937–1938)
- Joe Jorgenson (1946)
- Ron Bailey (1946)
- Len Smith (1948)
- Col Maxwell (1948)
- Wally O'Connell (1948)
- Bill Tyquin (1949)
- Keith Froome (1949)
- Clive Churchill (1950–1954)
- Ken Kearney (1956–1957)
- Dick Poole (1957)
- Brian Davies (1958)
- Brian Carlson (1959–1961)
- Keith Barnes (1959–1962)
- Barry Muir (1960–1961)
- Reg Gasnier (1962–1967)
- Arthur Summons (1962–1964)
- Billy Wilson (1963)
- Ian Walsh (1963–1966)
- Peter Gallagher (1967)
- Johnny Raper (1967–1968)
- John Sattler (1969–1970)
- Graeme Langlands (1970–1975)
- Phil Hawthorne (1970)
- Ron Coote (1970)
- Billy Smith (1970)
- Bob McCarthy (1973)
- Tommy Raudonikis (1973)
- Arthur Beetson (1973–1977)
- John Brass (1975)
- Greg Veivers (1977)
- Greg Pierce (1978)
- Bob Fulton (1978)
- George Peponis (1979–1980)
- Steve Rogers (1981)
- Max Krilich (1982–1983)
- Wally Lewis (1984–1989)
- Mal Meninga (1990–1994)
- Laurie Daley (1993–1998)
- Brad Fittler (1995–2001)
- Paul Harragon (1995)
- Geoff Toovey (1996)
- Allan Langer (1998)
- Gorden Tallis (2000–2002)
- Andrew Johns (2002–2003)
- Darren Lockyer (2003–2011)
- Danny Buderus (2004–2005)
- Craig Gower (2005)
- Cameron Smith (2007–2017)
- Boyd Cordner (2018–2019)
- James Tedesco (2022–2023)
- Isaah Yeo (2024–)

note* during 2020-2021 there were no international games

== Competitive records ==
=== Overall record ===
Below is the table of the official representative rugby league matches played by Australia at test level up until 16 November 2026:

Opponent	Played	Won	Lost	Drawn	Last meeting	Win%	For	Aga	Diff
Cook Islands	1	1	0	0	2026	100.00%	66	6	+60
England	27	18	7	2	2025	66.67%	598	291	+307
Fiji	9	9	0	0	2026	100.00%	498	60	+438
France	61	45	14	2	2017	73.77%	1476	547	+929
Great Britain*	139	73	61	5	2006	52.52%	2,352	1,745	+607
Ireland	1	1	0	0	2013	100.00%	50	0	+50
Italy	3	3	0	0	2022	100.00%	170	43	+127
Lebanon	2	2	0	0	2022	100.00%	82	4	+78
New Zealand*	148	110	35	3	2026	74.32%	3,377	1,978	+1,399
Māori	9	6	2	1	1980	66.67%	166	107	+59
Papua New Guinea	11	11	0	0	2010	100.00%	580	68	+512
Rest Of The World	3	3	0	0	1997	100.00%	70	29	+41
Russia	1	1	0	0	2000	100.00%	110	4	+106
Samoa	6	6	0	0	2023	100.00%	268	62	+206
Scotland	2	2	0	0	2022	100.00%	138	12	+126
South Africa	3	3	0	0	1995	100.00%	174	33	+141
Tonga†	4	3	1	0	2024	75%	84	46	+38
United States	2	2	0	0	2013	100.00%	98	24	+74
Wales	13	13	0	0	2011	100.00%	455	143	+312
Total	444	312	120	13	2026	70.27%	10,810	5,202	+5,608
*Includes five matches in 1997 as Australia (SL).
†Includes matches played against Tonga Invitational XIII.

=== World Cup ===
World Cup Record
Year	Round	Position	Pld	Win	Draw	Loss
(France) 1954	Group	3rd out of 4	3	1	0	2
(Australia) 1957	Winners	1st out of 4	3	3	0	0
(England) 1960	Group	2nd out of 4	3	2	0	1
(Australia) (New Zealand) 1968	Winners	1st out of 4	4	4	0	0
(England) 1970	Winners	1st out of 4	4	2	0	2
(France) 1972	Group	2nd out of 4	4	2	0	2
1975	Winners	1st out of 5	9	7	1	1
(Australia) (New Zealand) 1977	Winners	1st out of 4	4	4	0	0
1985-88	Winners	1st out of 5	8	6	0	2
1989-92	Winners	1st out of 5	9	9	0	0
(England) 1995	Winners	1st out of 10	5	4	0	1
(United Kingdom) (Ireland) (France) 2000	Winners	1st out of 16	6	6	0	0
(Australia) 2008	Final	2nd out of 10	5	4	0	1
(England) (Wales) 2013	Winners	1st out of 14	6	6	0	0
(Australia) (New Zealand) (Papua New Guinea) 2017	Winners	1st out of 14	6	6	0	0
(England) 2021	Winners	1st out of 16	6	6	0	0
(Australia) (New Zealand) (Papua New Guinea) 2026	Winners	1st out of 10	5	5	0	0

=== World Cup 9's ===
World Cup 9's Record
Host/s	Year	Round	Position	Pld	Win	Draw	Loss
Australia	2019	Winners	1st out of 12	5	5	0	0

=== Tri/Four Nations ===
Tri/ Four Nations Record
Host/s	Year	Round	Position	Pld	Win	Draw	Loss
Australia New Zealand	1999	Winners	1st out of 3	3	2	0	1
England	2004	Winners	1st out of 3	5	3	1	1
England	2005	Runners up	2nd out of 3	5	4	0	1
Australia New Zealand	2006	Winners	1st out of 3	5	4	0	1
England France	2009	Winners	1st out of 4	4	3	1	0
Australia New Zealand	2010	Final	2nd out of 4	4	3	0	1
England Wales	2011	Winners	1st out of 4	4	4	0	0
Australia New Zealand	2014	Final	2nd out of 4	4	2	0	2
England	2016	Winners	1st out of 4	4	4	0	0

=== Rugby League Pacific Championship ===
Rugby League Pacific Championship record
Year	Round	Position	GP	W	L	D
2019	Champions	1/3	2	1	1	0
2023	Second place	2/3	3	2	1	0
2024	Champions	1/3	3	3	0	0
Total	2 Titles	2/3	8	6	2	0

=== Kangaroo Tour Test matches ===
Year	To	Result	Score
1908–09	Great Britain	Loss	0–2
1911–12	Great Britain; Wales	Won; Won	2–0; 1–0
1919	New Zealand	Won	3–1
1921–22	Great Britain; Wales	Loss; Won	1–3; 1–0
1929–30	Great Britain; Wales	Loss; Won	1–2; 1–0
1933–34	Great Britain; Wales	Loss; Won	0–3; 1–0
1935	New Zealand	Won	2–1
1937–38	Great Britain; France	Loss; Won	1–2; 2–0
1948–49	Great Britain; Wales; France	Loss; Won; Won	0–3; 1–0; 2–0
1949	New Zealand	Draw	1–1
1952–53	Great Britain; France	Loss; Loss	1–2; 1–2
1953	New Zealand	Loss	1–2
1956–57	Great Britain; France	Loss; Won	1–2; 3–0
1959–60	Great Britain; France; Italy	Loss; Won; Won	1–2; 3–0; 2–0
1961	New Zealand	Draw	1–1
1963–64	Great Britain; France	Won; Won	2–1; 2–1
1965	New Zealand	Draw	1–1
1967–68	Great Britain; France	Won; Loss	2–1; 0–2
1969	New Zealand	Draw	1–1
1971	New Zealand	Loss	0–1
1973	Great Britain; France	Won; Won	2–1; 2–0
1978	Great Britain; Wales; France	Won; Won; Loss	2–1; 1–0; 0–2
1980	New Zealand	Won	2–0
1982	Great Britain; Wales; France	Won; Won; Won	3–0; 1–0; 2–0
1985	New Zealand	Won	2–1
1986	Great Britain; France	Won; Won	3–0; 2–0
1989	New Zealand	Won	3–0
1990	Great Britain; France	Won; Won	2–1; 2–0
1991	Papua New Guinea	Won	2–0
1993	New Zealand	Won	2–0
1994	Great Britain; Wales; France	Won; Won; Won	2–1; 1–0; 1–0
2001	Great Britain	Won	2–1
2003	Great Britain	Won	3–0
2025	England	Won	3–0

== Honours ==
- World Cup: 1957, 1968, 1970, 1975, 1977, 1988, 1992, 1995, 2000, 2013, 2017, 2021, 2026
- Tri-Nations/Four Nations: 1999, 2004, 2006, 2009, 2011, 2016
- Pacific Championship: 2019, 2024
- Anzac Test: 1997, 1999, 2000, 2004, 2005, 2006, 2007, 2008, 2009, 2010, 2011, 2012, 2013, 2014, 2016, 2017
- The Ashes: 1911, 1920, 1950, 1954, 1964, 1966, 1968, 1973, 1974, 1978, 1979, 1982, 1984, 1986, 1988, 1990, 1992, 1994, 2001, 2003, 2025

== IRL Rankings ==
IRL Men's World Rankings
Official rankings as of August 2026
Rank	Change	Team	Pts %
1	Steady	Australia	100
2	Steady	New Zealand	82
3	Steady	Tonga	70
4	Steady	Samoa	56
5	Steady	England	54
6	Steady	Papua New Guinea	47
7	Steady	Fiji	34
8	▲1	Cook Islands	24
9	▲2	Netherlands	23
10	▲2	Ukraine	21
11	▼3	France	21
12	▼2	Serbia	20
13	Steady	Wales	18
14	Steady	Ireland	17
15	Steady	Greece	14
16	Steady	Malta	14
17	▲12	Canada	13
18	▼1	Italy	11
19	▼1	Jamaica	9
20	▲7	Scotland	8
21	▲1	United States	8
22	▼3	Poland	7
23	▼3	Lebanon	7
24	▼1	Germany	7
25	▼1	Czech Republic	6
26	▼5	Norway	6
27	▼2	Chile	5
28	▲2	Philippines	5
29	▼1	South Africa	4
30	Steady	Brazil	3
31	Steady	Morocco	3
32	▲1	Argentina	3
33	▲2	Ghana	2
34	▲2	Kenya	2
35	▼1	Montenegro	2
36	▲1	Nigeria	2
37	▼5	North Macedonia	1
38	Steady	Albania	1
39	Steady	Turkey	1
40	Steady	Bulgaria	1
41	Steady	Cameroon	0
42	Steady	Japan	0
43	Steady	Spain	0
44	Steady	Colombia	0
45	Steady	Russia	0
46	Steady	El Salvador	0
47	Steady	Bosnia and Herzegovina	0
48	Steady	Hong Kong	0
49	Steady	Solomon Islands	0
50	Steady	Vanuatu	0
51	Steady	Hungary	0
52	Steady	Latvia	0
53	Steady	Denmark	0
54	Steady	Belgium	0
55	Steady	Estonia	0
56	Steady	Sweden	0
57	Steady	Niue	0
Complete rankings at www.internationalrugbyleague.com

== See also ==
- Australian Aboriginal rugby league team
- List of results of the Australian national rugby league team
- Australia national rugby union team
