= 2009 Anzac Test =

Australia	New Zealand
38	10
	1	2	Total
AUS	16	22	38
NZL	6	4	10
- Date: 8 May 2009
- Stadium: Suncorp Stadium
- Location: Brisbane, Australia
- Johnathan Thurston
- Referee: Richard Silverwood (England)
- Attendance: 37,152

Broadcast partners
- Broadcasters: Nine Network (AUS) Sky Sport (NZ)
- Commentators: Ray Warren; Phil Gould; Peter Sterling

The 2009 ANZAC test, was a rugby league test match played between Australia and New Zealand at the Suncorp Stadium in Brisbane on 8 May 2009. It was the 10th Anzac test played between the two nations since the first was played under the Super League banner in 1997. This was the fourth Anzac Test played in Brisbane.

This was the 112th test between Australia and New Zealand since 1908.

== Squads ==
Australia	Position	New Zealand
Billy Slater	Fullback	Lance Hohaia
Darius Boyd	Wing	Sam Perrett
Greg Inglis	Centre	Iosia Soliola
Justin Hodges	Centre	Jerome Ropati
Israel Folau	Wing	Manu Vatuvei
Darren Lockyer (c)	Five-Eighth	Nathan Fien
Johnathan Thurston	Halfback	Benji Marshall (c)
Steve Price	Prop	Roy Asotasi
Cameron Smith	Hooker	Dene Halatau
Petero Civoniceva	Prop	Adam Blair
Anthony Laffranchi	2nd Row	David Fa'alogo
Paul Gallen	2nd Row	Bronson Harrison
Glenn Stewart	Lock	Simon Mannering
Kurt Gidley	Interchange	Greg Eastwood
Brent Kite	Interchange	Jeff Lima
Luke Bailey	Interchange	Jason Nightingale
Anthony Watmough	Interchange	Sika Manu
Tim Sheens	Coach	Stephen Kearney

== Match Summary ==
8 May 2009

Australia	38 – 10	New Zealand
Tries: Justin Hodges (2); Johnathan Thurston (2); Darius Boyd; Israel Folau; Billy Slater; Goals: Johnathan Thurston (5/7)		Tries: Sam Perrett; Manu Vatuvei Goals: Benji Marshall (1/2)

Suncorp Stadium, Brisbane
Attendance: 37,152
Referee: Richard Silverwood (England)
Player of the Match: Johnathan Thurston
