= 2022 State of Origin series =

Australian rugby league series

- Won by: Queensland (23rd title)
- Series margin: 2–1
- Points scored: 116
- Attendance: 192,255 (ave. 64,085 per match)
- Player of the series: Patrick Carrigan (Wally Lewis Medal)
- Top points scorer(s): Nathan Cleary (30)
- Top try scorer(s): Nathan Cleary; Jarome Luai; Valentine Holmes (All 2 Tries Each)

The 2022 State of Origin series was the 41st annual best-of-three series between the Queensland and New South Wales rugby league teams. Before this series, Queensland had won 22 times, NSW 16 times, with two series drawn.

== Game I ==
Game One was played at Sydney's Accor Stadium, and was won by Queensland, 16 points to 10.

Blues centre Jack Wighton and Queensland five-eighth Cameron Munster produced performances of note, with the latter named Man of the Match. The match was also notable for its high attendance of 80,512 people, the highest rugby league attendance since the onset of the COVID-19 pandemic.

Wednesday, 8 June 2022
8:10pm (AEST)

New South Wales	10 – 16	Queensland
Tries: 2 Jack Wighton (14') 1 Cameron Murray (71') 1 Goals: 1 Nathan Cleary 1/2 (71')	1st: 4 – 6; 2nd: 6 – 10; Highlights; Match Stats (NRL); Reports	Tries: 3; 1 (34') Dane Gagai; 1 (48') Daly Cherry-Evans; 1 (53') Valentine Holmes; Goals: 2; 2/3 Valentine Holmes (36', 49')

Accor Stadium, Sydney
Attendance: 80,512
Referee: Ashley Klein
Player of the Match: Cameron Munster

== Game II ==
Game Two, held at Perth's Optus Stadium, before a sellout crowd of 59,358, saw Matt Burton and Nathan Cleary masterclasses deliver New South Wales a 44-12 victory to level the series at 1-1. Cleary scored 2 tries and 8 goals for a combined points total of 24, the second highest behind Ryan Girdler's 32 in New South Wales' 56-16 demolition of Queensland in Game III 2000.

Sunday, 26 June 2022
7:50pm (AEST)

New South Wales
Tries: 7
Nathan Cleary (63', 66') 2
Matt Burton (26') 1
Brian To'o (39') 1
Daniel Tupou (49') 1
Jarome Luai (58') 1
Angus Crichton (73') 1
Goals: 8
Nathan Cleary 8/8
(11' pen, 28', 40', 51', 59', 65', 67', 75')
44 – 12
1st: 14 – 12
2nd: 30 – 0
Highlights
Match Stats (NRL)
Reports

Queensland
Tries: 2
1 (22') Felise Kaufusi
1 (30') Cameron Munster
Goals: 2
2/2 Valentine Holmes
(24', 32')

Sin Bins:
(38') Felise Kaufusi

Optus Stadium, Perth
Attendance: 59,358
Referee: Ashley Klein
Player of the Match: Nathan Cleary

== Game III ==
Game Three, held at Suncorp Stadium started with three players being knocked out in the opening three minutes of the contest (Cameron Murray, Selwyn Cobbo and Lindsay Collins). After this, Queensland scored the opening try, before NSW exploded to take a 12-6 lead with tries to Jarome Luai and Jacob Saifiti. However, Queensland drew back within two points just before half time, capitalising on a dropped bomb from Daniel Tupou.

The second half began with a brawl between Queensland centre Dane Gagai and New South Wales centre Matt Burton. Gagai and Burton were both sent to the sin bin. From this moment on, Queensland began to wrestle momentum back through the kicking game of Daly Cherry-Evans and Ben Hunt, pinning New South Wales down their own end. The match was won by a try to Kalyn Ponga and a sealing chargedown try to Hunt, who sprinted 80 metres to score.

Wednesday, 13 July 2022
8:10pm (AEST)

Queensland	22 – 12	New South Wales
Tries: 4 Valentine Holmes (12') 1 Kurt Capewell (39') 1 Kalyn Ponga (60') 1 Ben Hunt (78') 1 Goals: 3 Valentine Holmes 3/4 (14', 62', 78'); Sin Bins: Dane Gagai (41')	1st:10 – 12; 2nd:12 – 0 Highlights; Match Stats (NRL); Reports	Tries:2; 1 (18') Jarome Luai; 1 (31') Jacob Saifiti; Goals: 2; 2/2 Nathan Cleary (19', 32'); Sin Bins: (41') Matt Burton

Suncorp Stadium, Brisbane
Attendance: 52,385
Referee: Ashley Klein
Player of the Match: Kalyn Ponga

== Teams ==
=== New South Wales Blues ===
Position	Game 1	Game 2	Game 3
Fullback	James Tedesco (c)		
Wing	Brian To'o		
Centre	Kotoni Staggs	Matt Burton	
Centre	Jack Wighton	Stephen Crichton	
Wing	Daniel Tupou		
Five-eighth	Jarome Luai		
Halfback	Nathan Cleary		
Prop	Payne Haas		Jake Trbojevic
Hooker	Damien Cook	Apisai Koroisau	
Prop	Reagan Campbell-Gillard	Jake Trbojevic	Junior Paulo
Second row	Tariq Sims	Cameron Murray	
Second row	Liam Martin		
Lock	Isaah Yeo		
Interchange	Junior Paulo		Jacob Saifiti
Interchange	Cameron Murray	Angus Crichton	
Interchange	Stephen Crichton	Damien Cook	
Interchange	Ryan Matterson	Siosifa Talakai	
Replacement	Nicho Hynes		Jack Wighton
Coach	Brad Fittler		

=== Queensland Maroons ===
Position	Game 1	Game 2	Game 3
Fullback	Kalyn Ponga		
Wing	Selwyn Cobbo		
Centre	Valentine Holmes		
Centre	Dane Gagai		
Wing	Xavier Coates	Murray Taulagi	Corey Oates
Five-eighth	Cameron Munster		Tom Dearden
Halfback	Daly Cherry-Evans (c)		
Prop	Tino Fa'asuamaleaui	Lindsay Collins	
Hooker	Ben Hunt		
Prop	Josh Papalii		
Second row	Kurt Capewell		
Second row	Felise Kaufusi		Jeremiah Nanai
Lock	Reuben Cotter	Tino Fa'asuamaleaui	Patrick Carrigan
Interchange	Harry Grant		
Interchange	Lindsay Collins	Jai Arrow	
Interchange	Patrick Carrigan		Tino Fa'asuamaleaui
Interchange	Jeremiah Nanai		Tom Gilbert
Replacement	Jai Arrow	Tom Dearden	Thomas Flegler
Coach	Billy Slater		

1 - With Paul Green fired after an uninspiring 2021 series, Billy Slater took over for his first series as Queensland coach.

2 - Despite making his Queensland debut in 2018, 2022 was the first time that Kalyn Ponga played in every game of an origin series.

3 - Corey Oates made his return to State of Origin, named for his first start at winger since Game 3 of the 2019 series.

== Player debuts ==
Game 1

- Cap no. 298, Kotoni Staggs
- Cap no. 299, Stephen Crichton
- Cap no. 300, Ryan Matterson
- Cap no. 222, Selwyn Cobbo
- Cap no. 223, Reuben Cotter
- Cap no. 224, Patrick Carrigan
- Cap no. 225, Jeremiah Nanai

Game 2

- Cap no. 301, Matt Burton
- Cap no. 302, Siosifa Talakai
- Cap no. 226, Murray Taulagi

Game 3

- Cap no. 303, Jacob Saifiti
- Cap no. 227, Tom Dearden
- Cap no. 228, Tom Gilbert

== Men's Under 19 State of Origin ==
Thursday, 23 June 2022
7.40pm (AEST)

New South Wales	32 – 4	Queensland
Tries: 5 Utuloa Asomua (15', 62') 2 Paul Alamoti (18') 1 Jack Bostock (21') 1 Thomas Weaver (25') 1 Goals: 6 Thomas Weaver 6/6 (17', 18', 23', 27', 53' pen, 63')	HT: 24–4; Highlights; Match Stats (NRL); Reports	Tries: 1; 1 (5') Jacob Mene; Goals: nil 0/1 Thomas Duffy

Leichhardt Oval, Sydney
Attendance: 3,174
Referee: Wyatt Raymond
Player of the Match: Jonah Pezet

Team details

FB	1	Terrell Kalo Kalo
WG	2	Utuloa Asomua
CE	3	Paul Alamoti
CE	4	Brad Morkos
WG	5	Jack Bostock
FE	6	Thomas Weaver
HB	7	Jonah Pezet
PR	8	Max Bradbury
HK	9	Tyler Moriarty
PR	10	Justin Matamua
SR	11	Oryn Keeley
SR	12	Brandon Tumeth
LK	13	Trey Mooney
Interchange:
IN	14	Jack Cole
IN	15	Toby Couchman
IN	16	Larry Muagututia
IN	17	Jacob Webster
CS	18	Charlie Thompson (not used)
Coach: Andrew Ryan

FB	1	Isaiah Iongi
WG	2	Jacob Mene
CE	3	Sosefo Fifita
CE	4	Robert Toia
WG	5	Xavier Chatfield-Mooka
FE	6	Harradyn Wilson
HB	7	Tom Duffy
PR	8	Xavier Va'a
HK	9	Blake Mozer
PR	10	Paul Bryan
SR	11	Eddie Hampson
SR	12	Jack Howarth
LF	13	Luke Jack
Interchange:
IN	14	Jye Gray
IN	15	Ben Te Kura
IN	16	Josiah Pahulu
IN	17	Kulikefu Finefeuiaki
CS	18	Kaleb Ngamanu (not used)
Coach: Kurt Richards

Touch judges: Cameron Paddy and Nick Pelgrave

== Women's State of Origin ==
The 2022 Women's State of Origin game was played on 24 June at GIO Stadium, Canberra. It was won 20–14 by New South Wales. The women's under-19s match, won 22–6 by New South Wales, was played the day before as a curtain raiser for the under-19 men's game at Leichhardt Oval, Sydney.

== Wheelchair State of Origin ==
The Wheelchair State of Origin game was played on 23 July at Townsville Stadium, Townsville. Queensland won the game 49–24 to retain the title.

Saturday, 23 July 2022

Queensland	49 – 24	New South Wales
Tries: 8 Z Schumacher 4 P Arbuckle 1 S Harre 1 J Hill 1 B McKenna 1 Goals: 8 B McKenna 6 S Harre 2 Field goals: 1 B McKenna 1	1st: 30 – 6; 2nd: 19 – 18; Report	Tries: 4; 1 T Popple; 1 C Cannane; 1 B Grove; 1 L Luff; Goals: 4; 2 C Cannane; 2 D Karim

Townsville Stadium, Townsville
Player of the Match: Peter Arbuckle

=== Squads ===
On 30 June 2022, the New South Wales Rugby League named the New South Wales team for this match: Jason Attard ( Wests Tigers), Cory Cannane ( St George Illawarra Dragons), Craig Cannane (c) ( St George Illawarra Dragons), William Derederenalagi ( Parramatta Eels), Rick Engles ( St George Illawarra Dragons), Brad Grove (c) ( Wests Tigers), Diab Karim ( Parramatta Eels), Liam Luff ( Parramatta Eels), Chris O'Brien ( Canberra Raiders), Toby Popple ( Canberra Raiders), Reserves: Zac Carl ( Canberra Raiders), Edge Iole ( St George Illawarra Dragons).

On 2 July, the Queensland squad was announced: Shaun Harre (cc), Zac Schumacher (cc), Peter Arbuckle, James Hill, Matty Lodewikus, Cory Mostran, Gage McAlpine, Bayley McKenna, Chris Robson, Adam Tannock, coach: Jack Brown.

== See also ==
- 2022 Australian football code crowds
