= 2020 State of Origin series =

Australian rugby league series

- Won by: Queensland (22nd title)
- Series margin: 2–1
- Points scored: 110
- Attendance: 110,585 (ave. 36,862 per match)
- Player of the series: Cameron Munster
- Top points scorer(s): Nathan Cleary (18)
- Top try scorer(s): Josh Addo-Carr (4)

The 2020 State of Origin series was the 39th annual best-of-three series between the Queensland and New South Wales rugby league teams. Before this series, Queensland has won 21 times, NSW 15 times, with two series drawn.

Originally, the series was to have been played in the traditional mid-season slot; however, due to the COVID-19 pandemic which caused the season to be suspended after round two, the series was moved to November, with the three matches to be played on consecutive Wednesday nights. On 15 May, the NRL announced that the matches would be played on three consecutive Wednesdays after the season's end, these being 4, 11 and 18 November.

For just the third time, a game was played away from Sydney, Brisbane or Melbourne, with Game 1 played at Adelaide’s Adelaide Oval.

Before the start of the series, Daily Telegraph journalist Dean Ritchie described the Queensland team as the worst ever Maroons side. Queensland would go on to upset a highly fancied New South Wales side and win the series 2–1.

== Game I ==
Wednesday, 4 November 2020
7:40pm (ACDT)

| New South Wales | 14 – 18 | Queensland |
|---|---|---|
| Tries: Josh Addo-Carr (20', 75') 2 Damien Cook (15') 1 Goals: Nathan Cleary 1/3 (16') | Report; 1st: 10 – 0; 2nd: 4 – 18 | Tries: 1 (49') Alexander Brimson; 1 (53') Xavier Coates; 1 (65') Cameron Munster; Goals: 3/4 Daly Cherry-Evans (51', 55', 66'); Sin Bin: (80') Felise Kaufusi |

Adelaide Oval, Adelaide
Attendance: 25,218
Referee: Gerard Sutton
Player of the Match: Daly Cherry-Evans

== Game II ==
Wednesday, 11 November 2020
8:10pm (AEDT)

| New South Wales | 34 – 10 | Queensland |
|---|---|---|
| Tries: Josh Addo-Carr (37', 64') 2 Cody Walker (16') 1 James Tedesco (22') 1 Jack Wighton (42') 1 Daniel Tupou (53') 1 Goals: Nathan Cleary 5/7 (18', 23', 38', 44', 57'); Sin Bin: Payne Haas (56') | Report; 1st: 18 – 4; 2nd: 16 – 6 | Tries: 1 (7') Xavier Coates; 1 (62') Josh Papalii; Goals: 1/2 Valentine Holmes (63'); Sin Bin: (56') Tino Fa'asuamaleaui |

ANZ Stadium, Sydney
Attendance: 36,212
Referee: Gerard Sutton
Player of the Match: Nathan Cleary

== Game III ==
Wednesday, 18 November 2020
7:10pm (AEST)

| Queensland | 20 – 14 | New South Wales |
|---|---|---|
| Tries: Valentine Holmes (3') 1 Edrick Lee (36') 1 Harry Grant (62') 1 Goals: Valentine Holmes 4/4 (5', 38', 57' pen, 63'); Sin Bin: Corey Allan (76') | Report; 1st: 12 – 6; 2nd: 8 – 8 | Tries: 1 (8') James Tedesco; 1 (65') Daniel Tupou; Goals: 3/3 Nathan Cleary (9', 66', 72' pen) |

Suncorp Stadium, Brisbane
Attendance: 49,155
Referee: Gerard Sutton
Player of the Match: Cameron Munster

== Teams ==
=== New South Wales Blues ===
| Position | Game 1 | Game 2 | Game 3 |
|---|---|---|---|
| Fullback | James Tedesco | James Tedesco (c) | |
| Wing | Daniel Tupou | | |
| Centre | Clinton Gutherson | | |
| Centre | Jack Wighton | | |
| Wing | Josh Addo-Carr | | |
| Five-eighth | Luke Keary | Cody Walker | |
| Halfback | Nathan Cleary | | |
| Prop | Daniel Saifiti | | |
| Hooker | Damien Cook | | |
| Prop | Junior Paulo | Payne Haas | |
| Second row | Boyd Cordner (c) | Angus Crichton | |
| Second row | Tyson Frizell | | |
| Lock | Jake Trbojevic | | |
| Interchange | Cody Walker | Dale Finucane | |
| Interchange | Payne Haas | Junior Paulo | |
| Interchange | Cameron Murray | Nathan Brown | |
| Interchange | Angus Crichton | Isaah Yeo | |
| Coach | Brad Fittler | | |

1 - As the series was to be played after the Grand Final due to the COVID-19 Pandemic, the NSW team was announced in a unique fashion, with players named on the Blues twitter page after their team was eliminated from the NRL finals series.

2 - Boyd Cordner suffered a concussion in Game 1, eventually leading to him announcing his retirement in 2021. It paved the way for James Tedesco to take over the captaincy from Game 2.

=== Queensland Maroons ===
| Position | Game 1 | Game 2 | Game 3 |
|---|---|---|---|
| Fullback | AJ Brimson | Valentine Holmes | Corey Allan |
| Wing | Xavier Coates | | Valentine Holmes |
| Centre | Dane Gagai | Kurt Capewell | Dane Gagai |
| Centre | Kurt Capewell | Dane Gagai | Brenko Lee |
| Wing | Phillip Sami | | Edrick Lee |
| Five-eighth | Cameron Munster | | |
| Halfback | Daly Cherry-Evans (c) | | |
| Prop | Christian Welch | Dunamis Lui | Christian Welch |
| Hooker | Jake Friend | | |
| Prop | Josh Papalii | | |
| Second row | Felise Kaufusi | | Kurt Capewell |
| Second row | Coen Hess | Jaydn Su'A | Felise Kaufusi |
| Lock | Tino Fa'asuamaleaui | | |
| Interchange | Ben Hunt | | Jaydn Su'A |
| Interchange | Lindsay Collins | | Harry Grant |
| Interchange | Jai Arrow | | Lindsay Collins |
| Interchange | Jaydn Su'A | Moeaki Fotuaika | Jai Arrow |
| Coach | Wayne Bennett | | |

1 - Kalyn Ponga was originally selected in the squad, but was subsequently forced to withdraw due to injury.

== Player debuts ==
=== Game 1 ===
- Cap no. 288, Clinton Gutherson
- Cap no. 289, Luke Keary
- Cap no. 290, Junior Paulo
- Cap no. 204, AJ Brimson
- Cap no. 205, Xavier Coates
- Cap no. 206, Phillip Sami
- Cap no. 207, Jake Friend
- Cap no. 208, Tino Fa'asuamaleaui
- Cap no. 209, Lindsay Collins
- Cap no. 210, Jaydn Su'A
- Cap no. 211, Kurt Capewell

=== Game 2 ===
- Cap no. 291, Nathan Brown
- Cap no. 292, Isaah Yeo
- Cap no. 212, Dunamis Lui
- Cap no. 213, Moeaki Fotuaika

=== Game 3 ===
- Cap no. 214, Corey Allan
- Cap no. 215, Edrick Lee
- Cap no. 216, Brenko Lee
- Cap no. 217, Harry Grant

== Teams ==
=== New South Wales Blues ===
| Pos. | Player | Date of birth (age) | Caps | Pts | Club |
|---|---|---|---|---|---|
| Wing | Josh Addo-Carr | 28 July 1995 (age 31) | 6 | 16 | Melbourne Storm |
| Lock | Nathan Brown | 1 March 1993 (age 33) | 0 | 0 | Parramatta Eels |
| Prop | Reagan Campbell-Gillard | 27 July 1993 (age 33) | 1 | 0 | Parramatta Eels |
| Halfback | Nathan Cleary | 14 November 1997 (age 29) | 5 | 14 | Penrith Panthers |
| Hooker | Damien Cook | 23 June 1991 (age 35) | 6 | 4 | South Sydney Rabbitohs |
| Second-row | Boyd Cordner (c) | 9 June 1992 (age 34) | 15 | 8 | Sydney Roosters |
| Wing | Nick Cotric | 18 November 1998 (age 27) | 1 | 0 | Canberra Raiders |
| Second-row | Angus Crichton | 5 February 1996 (age 30) | 4 | 0 | Sydney Roosters |
| Centre | Stephen Crichton | 22 September 2000 (age 26) | 0 | 0 | Penrith Panthers |
| Lock | Dale Finucane | 7 September 1991 (age 35) | 2 | 0 | Melbourne Storm |
| Second-row | Tyson Frizell | 9 October 1991 (age 35) | 11 | 12 | St George Illawarra Dragons |
| Fullback | Clinton Gutherson | 9 September 1994 (age 32) | 0 | 0 | Parramatta Eels |
| Prop | Payne Haas | 2 December 1999 (age 26) | 1 | 0 | Brisbane Broncos |
| Five-eighth | Luke Keary | 3 February 1992 (age 34) | 0 | 0 | Sydney Roosters |
| Centre | Zac Lomax^{1} | 24 September 1999 (age 27) | 0 | 0 | St George Illawarra Dragons |
| Five-eighth | Jarome Luai | 16 January 1997 (age 29) | 0 | 0 | Penrith Panthers |
| Hooker | Cameron McInnes | 1 February 1994 (age 32) | 0 | 0 | St George Illawarra Dragons |
| Lock | Cameron Murray | 16 January 1998 (age 28) | 3 | 0 | South Sydney Rabbitohs |
| Fullback | Ryan Papenhuyzen | 10 June 1998 (age 28) | 0 | 0 | Melbourne Storm |
| Prop | Junior Paulo | 20 November 1993 (age 32) | 0 | 0 | Parramatta Eels |
| Prop | Daniel Saifiti | 1 May 1996 (age 30) | 2 | 0 | Newcastle Knights |
| Fullback | James Tedesco | 8 January 1993 (age 33) | 10 | 20 | Sydney Roosters |
| Lock | Jake Trbojevic | 18 February 1994 (age 32) | 9 | 4 | Manly Warringah Sea Eagles |
| Wing | Daniel Tupou | 17 June 1991 (age 35) | 4 | 0 | Sydney Roosters |
| Five-eighth | Cody Walker | 10 January 1990 (age 36) | 1 | 0 | South Sydney Rabbitohs |
| Five-eighth | Jack Wighton | 4 February 1993 (age 33) | 3 | 0 | Canberra Raiders |
| Lock | Isaah Yeo | 6 November 1994 (age 32) | 0 | 0 | Penrith Panthers |

^{1} – Tom Trbojevic was originally selected in the squad, but was subsequently forced to withdraw due to injury. He was replaced by Zac Lomax.

=== Queensland Maroons ===
| Pos. | Player | Date of birth (age) | Caps | Pts | Club |
|---|---|---|---|---|---|
| Fullback | Corey Allan | 19 April 1998 (age 28) | 0 | 0 | South Sydney Rabbitohs |
| Lock | Jai Arrow | 12 July 1995 (age 31) | 4 | 0 | Gold Coast Titans |
| Fullback | AJ Brimson | 9 September 1998 (age 28) | 0 | 0 | Gold Coast Titans |
| Second-row | Kurt Capewell | 12 July 1993 (age 33) | 0 | 0 | Penrith Panthers |
| Lock | Patrick Carrigan | 1 January 1998 (age 28) | 0 | 0 | Brisbane Broncos |
| Halfback | Daly Cherry-Evans (c) | 20 February 1989 (age 37) | 10 | 4 | Manly-Warringah Sea Eagles |
| Wing | Xavier Coates | 12 March 2001 (age 25) | 0 | 0 | Brisbane Broncos |
| Prop | Lindsay Collins | 17 April 1996 (age 30) | 0 | 0 | Sydney Roosters |
| Lock | Tino Fa'asuamaleaui | 16 February 2000 (age 26) | 0 | 0 | Melbourne Storm |
| Prop | Moeaki Fotuaika | 16 November 1999 (age 26) | 0 | 0 | Gold Coast Titans |
| Hooker | Jake Friend | 4 February 1990 (age 36) | 0 | 0 | Sydney Roosters |
| Wing | Dane Gagai | 3 January 1991 (age 35) | 13 | 44 | South Sydney Rabbitohs |
| Hooker | Harry Grant | 17 February 1998 (age 28) | 0 | 0 | Melbourne Storm |
| Second-row | Coen Hess | 14 August 1996 (age 30) | 5 | 0 | North Queensland Cowboys |
| Fullback | Valentine Holmes | 24 July 1995 (age 31) | 5 | 44 | North Queensland Cowboys |
| Halfback | Ben Hunt | 27 March 1990 (age 36) | 7 | 0 | St George Illawarra Dragons |
| Wing | Hymel Hunt | 14 November 1993 (age 33) | 0 | 0 | Newcastle Knights |
| Second-row | Felise Kaufusi | 19 May 1992 (age 34) | 6 | 4 | Melbourne Storm |
| Prop | Josh Kerr | 11 February 1996 (age 30) | 0 | 0 | St George Illawarra Dragons |
| Centre | Brenko Lee | 10 October 1995 (age 31) | 0 | 0 | Melbourne Storm |
| Wing | Edrick Lee | 18 September 1992 (age 34) | 0 | 0 | Newcastle Knights |
| Prop | Dunamis Lui | 16 February 1990 (age 36) | 0 | 0 | Canberra Raiders |
| Five-eighth | Cameron Munster | 13 September 1994 (age 32) | 7 | 0 | Melbourne Storm |
| Prop | Josh Papalii | 13 May 1992 (age 34) | 15 | 8 | Canberra Raiders |
| Wing | Phillip Sami | 2 August 1997 (age 29) | 0 | 0 | Gold Coast Titans |
| Second-row | Jaydn Su'A | 23 October 1997 (age 29) | 0 | 0 | South Sydney Rabbitohs |
| Prop | Christian Welch | 19 July 1994 (age 32) | 1 | 0 | Melbourne Storm |

^{1} – Kalyn Ponga was originally selected in the squad, but was subsequently forced to withdraw due to injury.

== Women's State of Origin ==
The 2020 Women's State of Origin game was played on 13 November at the Sunshine Coast Stadium. Queensland won the game 24–18 to take the title for the first time since the competition came under the State of Origin brand.

== Wheelchair State of Origin ==
The annual wheelchair rugby league competition, which at the time was known as the Wheelchair State of Origin, was cancelled.
