= List of Queensland State of Origin players =

There have been over 200 rugby league footballers who have played for Queensland in State of Origin since its inception in 1980. All players who have been selected to debut for the Queensland in State of Origin matches have been assigned a number by the Queensland Rugby League. Arthur Beetson is first as he was the first captain. Players who debuted in the same game are capped by jumper number. Players are listed according to the date of their debut game.

== List of players ==
Cap no.	Name	Debut year	Debut game	Total games	Total points	Club
1.	Arthur Beetson	1980	Game 1	1	0	Parramatta Eels
2.	Colin Scott	1980	Game 1	16	8	Easts Tigers
3.	Kerry Boustead	1980	Game 1	6	19	Sydney Roosters
4.	Mal Meninga	1980	Game 1	32	161	Souths Logan Magpies
5.	Chris Close	1980	Game 1	9	6	Redcliffe Dolphins
6.	Brad Backer	1980	Game 1	3	3	Eastern Suburbs Tigers
7.	Alan Smith	1980	Game 1	1	0	North Sydney Bears
8.	Greg Oliphant	1980	Game 1	1	0	Balmain Tigers
9.	Wally Lewis	1980	Game 1	31	30	Fortitude Valley Diehards
10.	Rod Reddy	1980	Game 1	1	0	St. George Dragons
11.	Rohan Hancock	1980	Game 1	3	3	Toowoomba Wattles
12.	John Lang	1980	Game 1	1	0	Sydney Roosters
13.	Rod Morris	1980	Game 1	4	0	Balmain Tigers
14.	Norm Carr	1981	Game 1	4	0	Wests Panthers
15.	Bruce Astill	1983	Game 3	2	0	Souths Logan Magpies
16.	Mitch Brennan	1983	Game 3	2	0	Souths Logan Magpies
17.	Ross Henrick	1981	Game 1	7	0	Norths Devils
18.	Chris Phelan	1981	Game 1	4	0	Souths Logan Magpies
19.	Paul McCabe	1981	Game 1	5	0	South Sydney Rabbitohs
20.	Paul Khan	1981	Game 1	4	0	Cronulla-Sutherland Sharks
21.	Greg Conescu	1981	Game 1	21	8	Norths Devils
22.	Mark Murray	1981	Game 1	15	4	Norths Devils
23.	John Ribot	1982	Game 1	10	10	Manly Warringah Sea Eagles
24.	Paul Vautin	1982	Game 1	22	7	Manly Warringah Sea Eagles
25.	Bruce Walker	1982	Game 1	1	0	Manly Warringah Sea Eagles
26.	John Dowling	1982	Game 1	3	0	St. George Dragons
27.	Bob Kellaway	1982	Game 1	2	0	Past Brothers
28.	Gene Miles	1982	Game 1	20	23	Wynnum Manly Seagulls
29.	Graham Quinn	1982	Game 2	5	0	St. George Dragons
30.	Greg Holben	1982	Game 2	1	0	Eastern Suburbs Tigers
31.	Tony Currie	1984	Game 2	15	12	Wests Panthers
32.	Steve Stacey	1983	Game 1	2	4	Eastern Suburbs Tigers
33.	Dave Brown	1983	Game 1	12	4	Manly Warringah Sea Eagles
34.	Bryan Niebling	1983	Game 1	9	4	Fortitude Valley Diehards
35.	Darryl Brohman	1983	Game 1	2	0	Penrith Panthers
36.	Brad Tessmann	1983	Game 1	5	0	Souths Logan Magpies
37.	Brett French	1983	Game 1	5	4	Wynnum Manly Seagulls
38.	Wally Fullerton Smith	1983	Game 2	12	0	Redcliffe Dolphins
39.	Terry Butler	1983	Game 2	1	0	Wynnum Manly Seagulls
40.	Gavin Jones	1983	Game 3	4	0	Eastern Suburbs Tigers
41.	Greg Dowling	1984	Game 1	11	16	Wynnum Manly Seagulls
42.	Bob Lindner	1984	Game 1	25	28	Souths Logan Magpies
43.	Dale Shearer	1985	Game 1	26	66	Manly Warringah Sea Eagles
44.	Peter Jackson	1986	Game 1	17	10	Souths Logan Magpies
45.	Ian French	1985	Game 1	9	12	Wynnum Manly Seagulls
46.	Cavill Heugh	1985	Game 3	3	0	Eastern Suburbs Tigers
47.	Gary Belcher	1986	Game 2	16	48	Canberra Raiders
48.	Les Kiss	1986	Game 2	4	12	North Sydney Bears
49.	Grant Rix	1986	Game 3	1	0	Fortitude Valley Diehards
50.	Allan Langer	1987	Game 1	34	41	Ipswich Jets
51.	Trevor Gillmeister	1987	Game 1	22	0	Sydney Roosters
52.	Martin Bella	1987	Game 1	21	0	North Sydney Bears
53.	Gary Smith	1987	Game 1	2	0	Past Brothers
54.	Alan McIndoe	1988	Game 1	9	12	Illawarra Steelers
55.	Joe Kilroy	1988	Game 1	3	4	Brisbane Broncos
56.	Sam Backo	1988	Game 1	7	12	Canberra Raiders
57.	Scott Tronc	1988	Game 1	1	0	Western Suburbs Magpies
58.	Michael Hancock	1989	Game 1	14	20	Brisbane Broncos
59.	Dan Stains	1989	Game 1	4	0	Cronulla-Sutherland Sharks
60.	Kerrod Walters	1989	Game 1	7	8	Brisbane Broncos
61.	Michael Hagan	1989	Game 1	5	0	Newcastle Knights
62.	Gary Coyne	1989	Game 1	11	0	Canberra Raiders
63.	Kevin Walters	1989	Game 3	20	12	Canberra Raiders
64.	Mark Coyne	1990	Game 1	19	16	St. George Dragons
65.	Andrew Gee	1990	Game 2	17	4	Brisbane Broncos
66.	Willie Carne	1990	Game 3	12	26	Brisbane Broncos
67.	Steve Jackson	1990	Game 3	9	4	Western Suburbs Magpies
68.	Paul Hauff	1991	Game 1	3	4	Brisbane Broncos
69.	Mike McLean	1991	Game 1	5	0	Newcastle Knights
70.	Gary Larson	1991	Game 1	24	0	North Sydney Bears
71.	Steve Renouf	1991	Game 1	11	8	Brisbane Broncos
72.	Gavin Allen	1991	Game 1	8	0	Brisbane Broncos
73.	Steve Walters	1990	Game 1	14	4	Canberra Raiders
74.	Adrian Brunker	1992	Game 2	3	2	Newcastle Knights
75.	Billy Moore	1992	Game 2	17	8	North Sydney Bears
76.	Darren Smith	1992	Game 2	22	8	Canterbury-Bankstown Bulldogs
77.	Mark Hohn	1993	Game 1	9	0	Brisbane Broncos
78.	Julian O'Neill	1993	Game 2	10	26	Brisbane Broncos
79.	Brett Dallas	1993	Game 3	10	16	Canterbury-Bankstown Bulldogs
80.	Darren Fritz	1994	Game 1	3	0	Illawarra Steelers
81.	Adrian Vowles	1994	Game 2	1	0	Gold Coast Chargers
82.	Gorden Tallis	1994	Game 2	17	16	St. George Dragons
83.	Robbie O'Davis	1995	Game 1	12	6	Newcastle Knights
84.	Danny Moore	1995	Game 1	4	0	Manly Warringah Sea Eagles
85.	Matt Sing	1995	Game 1	24	20	Penrith Panthers
86.	Adrian Lam	1995	Game 1	14	16	Sydney Roosters
87.	Tony Hearn	1995	Game 1	7	0	North Sydney Bears
88.	Wayne Bartrim	1995	Game 1	9	22	St. George Dragons
89.	Ben Ikin	1995	Game 1	17	12	Gold Coast Chargers
90.	Terry Cook	1995	Game 1	3	0	South Queensland Crushers
91.	Craig Teevan	1995	Game 1	3	0	South Queensland Crushers
92.	Jason Smith	1994	Game 3	16	5	Canterbury-Bankstown Bulldogs
93.	Wendell Sailor	1996	Game 1	14	4	Brisbane Broncos
94.	Brad Thorn	1996	Game 1	11	4	Brisbane Broncos
95.	Alan Cann	1996	Game 1	1	0	Brisbane Broncos
96.	Craig Greenhill	1996	Game 1	6	0	Cronulla-Sutherland Sharks
97.	Owen Cunningham	1996	Game 2	1	0	Manly Warringah Sea Eagles
98.	Craig Smith	1997	Game 1	3	0	Illawarra Steelers
99.	Jamie Goddard	1997	Game 1	4	0	Gold Coast Chargers
100.	Neil Tierney	1997	Game 1	3	0	Manly Warringah Sea Eagles
101.	Jeremy Schloss	1997	Game 1	3	0	Gold Coast Chargers
102.	Stuart Kelly	1997	Game 1	3	0	Parramatta Eels
103.	Clinton O'Brien	1997	Game 2	2	0	South Queensland Crushers
104.	Darren Lockyer	1998	Game 1	36	82	Brisbane Broncos
105.	Shane Webcke	1998	Game 1	21	4	Brisbane Broncos
106.	Jason Hetherington	1998	Game 1	8	0	Canterbury-Bankstown Bulldogs
107.	Peter Ryan	1998	Game 1	2	0	Brisbane Broncos
108.	Steve Price	1998	Game 1	28	8	Canterbury-Bankstown Bulldogs
109.	Martin Lang	1998	Game 1	8	0	Cronulla-Sutherland Sharks
110.	Tonie Carroll	1998	Game 1	18	4	Brisbane Broncos
111.	Mat Rogers	1999	Game 1	5	37	Cronulla-Sutherland Sharks
112.	Chris McKenna	1999	Game 1	7	0	Cronulla-Sutherland Sharks
113.	Paul Green	1999	Game 2	10	4	North Queensland Cowboys
114.	Russell Bawden	2000	Game 1	3	0	Melbourne Storm
115.	Paul Bowman	2000	Game 1	12	8	North Queensland Cowboys
116.	Lote Tuqiri	2001	Game 1	6	28	Brisbane Broncos
117.	Daniel Wagon	2001	Game 1	3	0	Parramatta Eels
118.	John Doyle	2001	Game 1	3	4	North Queensland Cowboys
119.	John Buttigieg	2001	Game 1	3	4	North Queensland Cowboys
120.	Petero Civoniceva	2001	Game 1	33	4	Brisbane Broncos
121.	Kevin Campion	2001	Game 1	4	0	New Zealand Warriors
122.	Chris Walker	2001	Game 1	6	16	Brisbane Broncos
123.	Chris Beattie	2001	Game 1	3	0	Cronulla-Sutherland Sharks
124.	Carl Webb	2001	Game 1	12	8	Brisbane Broncos
125.	Brad Meyers	2001	Game 1	3	0	Brisbane Broncos
126.	Nathan Fien	2001	Game 2	1	0	North Queensland Cowboys
127.	Dane Carlaw	2001	Game 3	13	16	Brisbane Broncos
128.	Clinton Schifcofske	2002	Game 1	2	4	Canberra Raiders
129.	Shaun Berrigan	2002	Game 1	15	8	Brisbane Broncos
130.	Justin Hodges	2002	Game 2	24	22	Sydney Roosters
131.	PJ Marsh	2002	Game 2	4	0	New Zealand Warriors
132.	Travis Norton	2002	Game 2	5	0	Canterbury-Bankstown Bulldogs
133.	Chris Flannery	2002	Game 2	10	0	Sydney Roosters
134.	Brent Tate	2002	Game 3	23	20	Brisbane Broncos
135.	Shannon Hegarty	2003	Game 1	3	0	Sydney Roosters
136.	Michael Crocker	2003	Game 2	13	12	Sydney Roosters
137.	Scott Sattler	2003	Game 2	1	0	Penrith Panthers
138.	Matt Bowen	2003	Game 2	10	16	North Queensland Cowboys
139.	Josh Hannay	2003	Game 3	2	8	North Queensland Cowboys
140.	Cameron Smith	2003	Game 3	42	58	Melbourne Storm
141.	Rhys Wesser	2004	Game 1	4	0	Penrith Panthers
142.	Billy Slater	2004	Game 1	31	48	Melbourne Storm
143.	Scott Prince	2004	Game 1	5	6	Wests Tigers
144.	Ben Ross	2004	Game 1	6	0	Penrith Panthers
145.	Willie Tonga	2004	Game 2	8	12	Canterbury-Bankstown Bulldogs
146.	Corey Parker	2004	Game 2	19	0	Brisbane Broncos
147.	Ty Williams	2005	Game 1	3	4	North Queensland Cowboys
148.	Johnathan Thurston	2005	Game 1	37	220	North Queensland Cowboys
149.	Casey McGuire	2005	Game 1	2	0	Brisbane Broncos
150.	Danny Nutley	2005	Game 3	1	0	Cronulla-Sutherland Sharks
151.	Ashley Harrison	2005	Game 3	15	0	South Sydney Rabbitohs
152.	Greg Inglis	2006	Game 1	32	72	Melbourne Storm
153.	Steven Bell	2006	Game 1	5	8	Manly Warringah Sea Eagles
154.	David Stagg	2006	Game 1	1	0	Brisbane Broncos
155.	Matthew Scott	2006	Game 1	22	4	North Queensland Cowboys
156.	Dallas Johnson	2006	Game 1	12	4	Melbourne Storm
157.	Sam Thaiday	2006	Game 1	29	12	Brisbane Broncos
158.	Nate Myles	2006	Game 1	32	4	Canterbury-Bankstown Bulldogs
159.	Karmichael Hunt	2006	Game 2	10	0	Brisbane Broncos
160.	Adam Mogg	2006	Game 2	2	12	Canberra Raiders
161.	Jacob Lillyman	2006	Game 2	14	0	North Queensland Cowboys
162.	Neville Costigan	2007	Game 1	6	0	Canberra Raiders
163.	Antonio Kaufusi	2007	Game 1	1	0	Melbourne Storm
164.	Israel Folau	2008	Game 1	5	28	Melbourne Storm
165.	Ben Hannant	2008	Game 1	12	8	Brisbane Broncos
166.	Darius Boyd	2008	Game 2	28	68	Brisbane Broncos
167.	David Shillington	2009	Game 3	8	0	Canberra Raiders
168.	Cooper Cronk	2010	Game 1	22	14	Melbourne Storm
169.	David Taylor	2010	Game 1	8	0	South Sydney Rabbitohs
170.	Matt Ballin	2010	Game 1	1	0	Manly Warringah Sea Eagles
171.	Dane Nielsen	2011	Game 1	3	0	Melbourne Storm
172.	Jharal Yow Yeh	2011	Game 1	3	8	Brisbane Broncos
173.	Matt Gillett	2012	Game 1	20	8	Brisbane Broncos
174.	Ben Te'o	2012	Game 3	6	0	Brisbane Broncos
175.	Chris McQueen	2013	Game 1	6	0	South Sydney Rabbitohs
176.	Daly Cherry-Evans	2013	Game 2	26	22	Manly Warringah Sea Eagles
177.	Josh Papalii	2013	Game 2	24	12	Canberra Raiders
178.	Aidan Guerra	2014	Game 1	10	8	Sydney Roosters
179.	Will Chambers	2014	Game 3	13	16	Melbourne Storm
180.	Josh McGuire	2015	Game 1	14	4	Brisbane Broncos
181.	Michael Morgan	2015	Game 1	12	4	North Queensland Cowboys
182.	Dane Gagai	2015	Game 3	23	52	Newcastle Knights
183.	Corey Oates	2016	Game 1	8	12	Brisbane Broncos
184.	Justin O'Neill	2016	Game 1	4	0	North Queensland Cowboys
185.	Gavin Cooper	2016	Game 3	6	4	North Queensland Cowboys
186.	Anthony Milford	2017	Game 1	2	0	Brisbane Broncos
187.	Dylan Napa	2017	Game 1	7	0	Sydney Roosters
188.	Valentine Holmes	2017	Game 2	22	162	North Queensland Cowboys
189.	Jarrod Wallace	2017	Game 2	6	4	Gold Coast Titans
190.	Coen Hess	2017	Game 2	6	0	North Queensland Cowboys
191.	Tim Glasby	2017	Game 2	5	0	Melbourne Storm
192.	Cameron Munster	2017	Game 3	21	16	Melbourne Storm
193.	Ben Hunt	2017	Game 3	13	12	Brisbane Broncos
194.	Andrew McCullough	2018	Game 1	4	0	Brisbane Broncos
195.	Felise Kaufusi	2018	Game 1	14	4	Melbourne Storm
196.	Jai Arrow	2018	Game 1	11	0	Gold Coast Titans
197.	Kalyn Ponga	2018	Game 2	10	12	Newcastle Knights
198.	Moses Mbye	2019	Game 1	3	0	Wests Tigers
199.	Joe Ofahengaue	2019	Game 1	3	0	Brisbane Broncos
200.	David Fifita	2019	Game 1	8	4	Brisbane Broncos
201.	Corey Norman	2019	Game 3	1	0	St George Illawarra Dragons
202.	Christian Welch	2019	Game 3	4	0	Melbourne Storm
203.	Ethan Lowe	2019	Game 3	1	8	South Sydney Rabbitohs
204.	AJ Brimson	2020	Game 1	2	4	Gold Coast Titans
205.	Xavier Coates	2020	Game 1	6	24	Brisbane Broncos
206.	Phillip Sami	2020	Game 1	2	0	Gold Coast Titans
207.	Kurt Capewell	2020	Game 1	13	12	Penrith Panthers
208.	Jake Friend	2020	Game 1	3	0	Sydney Roosters
209.	Tino Fa'asuamaleaui	2020	Game 1	15	0	Gold Coast Titans
210.	Lindsay Collins	2020	Game 1	15	0	Sydney Roosters
211.	Jaydn Su'A	2020	Game 1	6	0	South Sydney Rabbitohs
212.	Dunamis Lui	2020	Game 2	1	0	Canberra Raiders
213.	Moeaki Fotuaika	2020	Game 2	10	0	Gold Coast Titans
214.	Corey Allan	2020	Game 3	1	0	South Sydney Rabbitohs
215.	Edrick Lee	2020	Game 3	1	4	Newcastle Knights
216.	Brenko Lee	2020	Game 3	1	0	Melbourne Storm
217.	Harry Grant	2020	Game 3	14	8	Wests Tigers
218.	Kyle Feldt	2021	Game 1	2	0	North Queensland Cowboys
219.	Francis Molo	2021	Game 2	2	0	North Queensland Cowboys
220.	Hamiso Tabuai-Fidow	2021	Game 3	10	44	North Queensland Cowboys
221.	Thomas Flegler	2021	Game 3	3	0	Brisbane Broncos
222.	Selwyn Cobbo	2022	Game 1	3	0	Brisbane Broncos
223.	Reuben Cotter	2022	Game 1	10	0	North Queensland Cowboys
224.	Patrick Carrigan	2022	Game 1	12	0	Brisbane Broncos
225.	Jeremiah Nanai	2022	Game 1	11	0	North Queensland Cowboys
226.	Murray Taulagi	2022	Game 2	6	0	North Queensland Cowboys
227.	Tom Dearden	2022	Game 3	7	8	North Queensland Cowboys
228.	Tom Gilbert	2022	Game 3	1	0	North Queensland Cowboys
229.	Reece Walsh	2023	Game 1	1	0	Brisbane Broncos
230.	Corey Horsburgh	2023	Game 3	1	0	Canberra Raiders
231.	J'maine Hopgood	2024	Game 1	1	0	Parramatta Eels
232.	Robert Toia	2025	Game 1	3	0	Sydney Roosters
233.	Beau Fermor	2025	Game 1	1	0	Gold Coast Titans
234.	Trent Loiero	2025	Game 1	3	0	Melbourne Storm
235.	Kurt Mann	2025	Game 2	3	0	Canterbury-Bankstown Bulldogs
236.	Gehamat Shibasaki	2025	Game 3	1	0	Brisbane Broncos

=== Under-20s ===
The following is a list of players who have played for the Queensland under-20 team since the first game in 2012. Players who represent the under-20 team are not given a cap number, so they are listed alphabetically by the year they made their debut.

Cap no.	Name	Debut year	Total games	Total points	Club
1.	Alex Elisala	2012	1	0	North Queensland Cowboys
2.	Mitchell Frei	2012	1	2	Brisbane Broncos
3.	Chris Grevsmuhl	2012	2	0	North Queensland Cowboys|
4.	Ben Hampton	2012	1	0	Melbourne Storm
5.	Hymel Hunt	2012	2	0	Gold Coast Titans
6.	Edrick Lee	2012	1	8	Canberra Raiders
7.	Ben Malley	2012	1	0	Brisbane Broncos
8.	Kurt Mann	2012	2	0	Newcastle Knights
9.	Lachlan Maranta	2012	1	0	Brisbane Broncos
10.	Moses Mbye	2012	2	0	Canterbury-Bankstown Bulldogs
11.	Tautau Moga	2012	1	0	Sydney Roosters
12.	Dylan Napa	2012	1	0	Sydney Roosters
13.	Corey Oates	2012	2	0	Brisbane Broncos
14.	Travis Peeters	2012	1	0	Brisbane Broncos
15.	Brandon Tago	2012	2	4	Sydney Roosters
16.	Caleb Timu	2012	2	0	Brisbane Broncos
17.	Aaron Whitchurch	2012	1	4	Brisbane Broncos
18.	Luke Bateman	2013	3	8	Canberra Raiders
19.	Patrick Kaufusi	2013	1	0	North Queensland Cowboys
20.	Brenko Lee	2013	2	4	Canberra Raiders
21.	Nene Macdonald	2013	2	0	Sydney Roosters
22.	Rhyse Martin	2013	1	0	Sydney Roosters
23.	Anthony Milford	2013	2	8	Canberra Raiders
24.	Francis Molo	2013	2	0	Brisbane Broncos
25.	Kierran Moseley	2013	2	0	Penrith Panthers
26.	Lloyd Perrett	2013	2	0	Canterbury-Bankstown Bulldogs
27.	Zac Santo	2013	1	0	North Queensland Cowboys
28.	Ajuma Adams	2014	1	0	Brisbane Broncos
29.	Brendan Elliot	2014	1	0	Sydney Roosters
30.	Jaelen Feeney	2014	1	0	Newcastle Knights
31.	John Folau	2014	1	4	Parramatta Eels
32.	Brett Greinke	2014	1	0	Brisbane Broncos
33.	Valentine Holmes	2014	1	0	Cronulla-Sutherland Sharks
34.	Patrick Mago	2014	1	0	Canberra Raiders
35.	Cameron Munster	2014	1	0	Melbourne Storm
36.	Joe Ofahengaue	2014	1	0	Brisbane Broncos
37.	Christian Welch	2014	1	0	Melbourne Storm
38.	Jai Arrow	2015	1	0	Brisbane Broncos
39.	Alex Barr	2015	1	4	Brisbane Broncos
40.	Jayden Berrell	20151	0		Brisbane Broncos
41.	Paul Byrnes	2015	1	0	Brisbane Broncos
42.	Conor Carey	2015	1	0	North Queensland Cowboys
43.	Lindsay Collins	2015	1	0	Brisbane Broncos
44.	Jordan Drew	2015	1	0	Brisbane Broncos
45.	George Fai	2015	2	0	Brisbane Broncos
46.	Gideon Gela-Mosby	2015	2	8	North Queensland Cowboys
47.	Coen Hess	2015	1	0	North Queensland Cowboys
48.	Sam Lavea	2015	1	0	Brisbane Broncos
49.	Karl Lawton	2015	1	0	Gold Coast Titans
50.	Jayden Nikorima	2015	1	0	Brisbane Broncos
51.	Marion Seve	2015	1	0	Wests Tigers
52.	Ashley Taylor	2015	1	4	Brisbane Broncos
53.	Oshae Tuiasau	2015	1	0	Gold Coast Titans
54.	Cooper Bambling	2016	1	0	North Queensland Cowboys
56.	Brodie Croft	2016	2	6	Melbourne Storm
57.	Charlie Galo	2016	1	0	Melbourne Storm
58.	Marcus Jensen	2016	1	0	North Queensland Cowboys
59.	Josh Kerr	2016	1	0	Melbourne Storm
60.	Bernard Lewis	2016	1	12	Sydney Roosters
61.	Lachlan Lewis	2016	1	0	Canterbury-Bankstown Bulldogs
62.	Darcy Maroske	2016	1	0	Canterbury-Bankstown Bulldogs
63.	Jack Morris	2016	1	0	Parramatta Eels
64.	Bacho Salam	2016	1	4	North Queensland Cowboys
65.	Darryn Schonig	2016	1	0	North Queensland Cowboys
66.	Gehamat Shibasaki	2016	3	0	Brisbane Broncos
67.	Jaydn Su'A	2016	1	0	Brisbane Broncos
68.	Lachlan Timm	2016	1	0	Melbourne Storm
69.	Jake Turpin	2016	1	0	Melbourne Storm
70.	Corey Allan	2017	2	0	Brisbane Broncos
71.	AJ Brimson	2017	2	0	Gold Coast Titans
72.	Daniel Brownbill	2017	1	0	Gold Coast Titans
73.	Gerome Burns	2017	1	0	Brisbane Broncos
74.	Patrick Carrigan	2017	2	0	Brisbane Broncos
75.	Mitchell Dunn	2017	1	0	North Queensland Cowboys
76.	Harry Grant	2017	2	0	Melbourne Storm
77.	Keegan Hipgrave	2017	1	0	Gold Coast Titans
78.	Corey Horsburgh	2017	2	8	North Queensland Cowboys
79.	Apiata Noema	2017	1	0	Gold Coast Titans
80.	Keenan Palasia	2017	1	0	Brisbane Broncos
81.	Tristan Sailor	2017	2	12	St George Illawarra Dragons
82.	Phillip Sami	2017	1	0	Gold Coast Titans
83.	Tom Skinner	2017	1	0	Penrith Panthers
84.	Hiale Slade-Roycroft	2017	1	0	North Queensland Cowboys
85.	Jake Clifford	2018	1	18	North Queensland Cowboys
86.	Tino Fa'asuamaleaui	2018	2	0	Melbourne Storm
87.	Beau Fermor	2018	1	0	Newcastle Knights
88.	Tom Flegler	2018	1	0	Brisbane Broncos
89.	Louis Geraghty	2018	1	0	Melbourne Storm
90.	Sam Johnstone	2018	1	0	South Sydney Rabbitohs
91.	Lachlan Lam	2018	1	0	Sydney Roosters
92.	Reed Mahoney	2018	1	0	Parramatta Eels
93.	Murray Taulagi	2018	2	4	North Queensland Cowboys
94.	Kurt Wiltshire	2018	1	4	North Queensland Cowboys
95.	Elijah Anderson	2019	1	0	North Queensland Cowboys
96.	Nathan Barrett	2019	1	0	North Queensland Cowboys
97.	Logan Bayliss-Brow	2019	1	0	North Queensland Cowboys
98.	Eddie Blacker	2019	1	0	St George Illawarra Dragons
99.	Tanah Boyd	2019	1	0	Gold Coast Titans
100.	Ethan Bullemor	2019	1	0	Brisbane Broncos
101.	Ben Condon	2019	1	0	North Queensland Cowboys
102.	Tom Gilbert	2019	1	0	North Queensland Cowboys
103.	Kobe Hetherington	2019	1	0	Brisbane Broncos
104.	J'maine Hopgood	2019	1	0	Penrith Panthers
105.	Ronaldo Mulitalo	2019	1	4	Cronulla-Sutherland Sharks
106.	Fanitesi Niu	2019	1	0	Brisbane Broncos
107.	Cory Paix	2019	1	0	Brisbane Broncos
108.	Treymain Spry	2019	1	0	Gold Coast Titans
109.	Braydon Trindall	2019	1	2	Cronulla-Sutherland Sharks

=== Women's ===
The following is a list of players who have played for the Queensland women's team since their first game in 1999. The following list has missing information as accurate records were not kept in the early years of the Women's Interstate Challenge by either the QRL or the NSWRL. In 2019, the QRL announced cap numbers for women's representatives.

Cap no.	Name	Debut year	Total games	Total points
1.	Karyn Murphy	1999	20	?
2.	Erica Ross	1999	?	?
3.	Teresa Anderson	1999	?	?
4.	Karen Shaw	1999	?	?
5.	Tammy Pohatu	1999	?	?
6.	Tracey Thompson	1999	?	?
7.	Annie Banks	1999	?	?
8.	Debbie Merritt	1999	?	?
9.	Karen Stuart	1999	?	?
10.	Kellie Batchelor	1999	?	?
11.	Kirsty Taylor	1999	?	?
12.	Veronica White	1999	?	?
13.	Jodie Billing	1999	?	?
14.	Kerri Shiplock	1999	?	?
15.	Megan Stiffler	1999	?	?
16.	Gina Sterling	1999	?	?
17.	Debbie Mulherin	1999	?	?
18.	Sharon Mitchell-Cowan	?	?	?
19.	Kelly O'Doherty	?	?	?
20.	Yvonne O'Neill	?	?	?
21.	Liz Ryan	?	?	?
22.	Tahnee Norris	?	13	?
23.	Tanya Mulder	?	?	?
24.	Katrina Birch	?	?	?
25.	Selena Malone	?	?	?
26.	Melissa Edwards	?	?	?
27.	Emma Bower	?	?	?
28.	Sam Ramsamy	?	?	?
29.	Tracey McGovern	?	?	?
30.	Karley Banks	?	?	?
31.	Tracy Bailey	?	?	?
32.	Raylee Taka	?	?	?
33.	Selena Barry	?	?	?
34.	Lisa Elkins	?	?	?
35.	Neena Fraser	?	?	?
36.	Erin Elliott	?	?	?
37.	Jaye Christensen	?	?	?
38.	Tracey Musgrove	?	?	?
39.	Michelle Mercy	?	?	?
40.	Rebecca Tavo	?	?	?
41.	Tarah Westera	2002	?	?
42.	Leah Williams	?	?	?
43.	Jo Barrett	?	?	?
44.	Steph Hancock	2004	17	?
45.	Rosie Su'emalo Aleki	?	?	?
46.	Kris Bethell	?	?	?
47.	Rebecca Jones	?	?	?
48.	Caroline White	?	?	?
49.	Cindy Reid	?	?	?
50.	Aimee Gilbert	?	?	?
51.	Claudia Kumeroa	?	?	?
52.	Mere Baker	?	?	?
53.	Patricia Fraser	?	?	?
54.	Lisa Holder	?	?	?
55.	Tooa Nanai	?	?	?
56.	Therese Aiton	?	?	?
57.	Jennifer Pope	?	?	?
58.	Keryn Goymer	?	?	?
59.	Meagan Spicer	2006	?	?
60.	Kerryanne Stead	2006	?	?
61.	Tammy Cole	2006	?	?
62.	Anna-Marie Burki	2006	?	?
63.	Jasmine Green	2007	?	?
64.	Casey Watkins	2007	?	?
65.	Suzanne Johnson	2007	?	?
66.	Rachele Whelan	2007	?	?
67.	Bianca Ambrum	2007	5	28
68.	Hayley Vankempen	2007	1	?
69.	Alisha Creed	2007	1	?
70.	Tania Davis	2007	1	?
71.	Alex Robertson	2007	1	?
72.	Tegan Rolfe	2008	?	?
73.	Amie Solomona	2008	?	?
74.	Renae Kunst	2008	?	?
75.	Deanna Turner	2008	?	?
76.	Naomi Bobongie	2008	?	?
77.	Ashley Oberleuter	2008	?	?
78.	Nive Moefaauo	2009	1	4
79.	Latisha Gary	2009	3	8
80.	Heather Ballinger	2009	11	0
81.	Natalie Dwyer	2009	5	26
82.	Kate Haren	2009	2	0
83.	Kerri Swan	2009	1	0
84.	Ali Brigginshaw	2009	13	10
85.	Dana Kane	2009	1	0
86.	Karina Brown	2009	10	16
87.	Delwyn Fraser	2010	2	0
88.	Sarah Robins	2010	1	0
89.	Yvette Martin	2010	1	0
90.	Nicole Curtis	2011	1	0
91.	Tui Cope	2011	1	0
92.	Natasha Baggow	2011	1	4
93.	Natalie Gala	2011	2	4
94.	Kaitlin Moss	2011	2	0
95.	Amber Saltner	2012	2	12
96.	Jenni-Sue Hoepper	2013	5	10
97.	Nicole Richards	2013	2	0
98.	Talia Poutini-Lawrence	2014	1	0
99.	Kellye Hodges	2014	1	4
100.	Annette Brander	2014	6	0
101.	Kady Tinker	2014	1	0
102.	Brittany Breayley	2014	8	0
103.	Teri Nukunuku	2014	1	0
104.	Jazmyn Taumafai	2014	2	0
105.	Aleasha Brider	2014	1	0
106.	Chelsea Baker	2015	5	8
107.	Kody House	2015	4	0
108.	Latoya Billy	2015	1	0
109.	Courtney Lockwood	2015	2	0
110.	Carly Bell	2015	1	0
111.	Florence Faamita	2015	1	0
112.	Sarah Walker	2015	1	0
113.	Amelia Kuk	2016	3	0
114.	Tazmin Gray	2016	8	8
115.	Rona Peters	2016	6	0
116.	Libby Cook-Black	2016	1	0
117.	Stefanie Gallagher	2016	1	0
118.	Selena Tranter	2016	1	0
119.	Courtney Robinson	2017	1	0
120.	Zahara Temara	2017	5	2
121.	Sasha Mahuika	2017	1	0
122.	Asipau Mafi	2017	1	0
123.	Chelsea Lenarduzzi	2017	5	0
124.	Meg Ward	2018	2	0
125.	Rhiannon Revell-Blair	2018	1	0
126.	Maitua Feterika	2018	1	0
127.	Mariah Storch	2018	1	0
128.	Tallisha Harden	2018	5	0
129.	Amy Turner	2019	1	0
130.	Stephanie Mooka	2019	1	0
131.	Amber Pilley	2019	1	0
133.	Jessika Elliston	2019	3	0
133.	Tamika Upton	2020	4	8
134.	Shenae Ciesiolka	2020	4	0
135.	Julia Robinson	2020	4	8
136.	Lauren Brown	2020	3	12
137.	Tarryn Aiken	2020	4	8
138.	Shannon Mato	2020	3	0
139.	Shaniah Power	2020	3	0
140.	Destiny Brill	2021	3	8
141.	Tiana Raftstrand-Smith	2021	2	0
142.	Brianna Clark	2021	1	0
143.	Emily Bass	2022	2	4
144.	Evania Pelite	2022	2	4
145.	Keilee Joseph	2023	1	0
146.	Emma Manzelmann	2023	1	0
147.	Sophie Holyman	2023	1	0
148.	Romy Teitzel	2023	1	0
149.	China Polata	2023		
150.	Makenzie Weale	2024		
151.	Sienna Lofipo	2024		
152.	Emmanita Paki	2024		
153.	Rory Owen	2025		
154.	Jasmine Peters	2025		
155.	Jada Ferguson	2025		
156.	Tavarna Papalii	2025		
157.	Hayley Maddick	2025		
158.	Georgia Hannaway	2025		

== See also ==
- List of New South Wales State of Origin players
