= 2017 State of Origin series =

Australian rugby league series

- Won by: Queensland (21st title)
- Series margin: 2-1
- Points scored: 94
- Attendance: 185,189 (ave. 61,730 per match)
- Player of the series: Dane Gagai
- Top points scorer(s): James Maloney (18)
- Top try scorer(s): Valentine Holmes (4)

The 2017 State of Origin series was the 36th annual best-of-three series between the Queensland and New South Wales rugby league teams. Before this series Queensland had won 20 times, NSW 13 times, with two series drawn. Queensland were the current title holders coming into the series, having won 2-1 in 2016.

With Games One and Two completed, the series was tied with 1 win to each team. Game Three (the Decider) was played in Brisbane at Suncorp Stadium; leading to a 22-6 win to Queensland.

Former Queensland rugby league legend Kevin Walters coached Queensland for the 2nd year after his maiden series win in 2016. Former Canberra, New South Wales and Australia captain Laurie Daley coached New South Wales for the 5th year, looking for his 2nd series win after New South Wales' 2-1 win in 2014.

Queensland won their third consecutive series and their eleventh from the past twelve. New South Wales had decided on an unchanged team throughout the series, for the first time since 1996.

== Game I ==
Wednesday, May 31, 2017
8:15 pm

Queensland	4 – 28	New South Wales
Tries: Corey Oates (35') 1 Goals: Cameron Smith 0/1	1st: 4 – 12; 2nd: 0 – 16	Tries: 1 (6') James Maloney; 1 (40') Mitchell Pearce; 1 (52') James Tedesco; 1 (55') Andrew Fifita; 1 (60') Jarryd Hayne; Goals: 4/5 James Maloney (8', 40', 53', 56')

Suncorp Stadium, Brisbane
Attendance: 50,390
Referee: Matt Cecchin, Gerard Sutton
Player of the Match: Andrew Fifita

== Game II ==
Wednesday, June 21, 2017
8:15 pm

New South Wales	16 – 18	Queensland
Tries: Jarryd Hayne (14') 1 Brett Morris (24') 1 Mitchell Pearce (27') 1 Goals: James Maloney 2/3 (16', 28')	1st: 16 – 6; 2nd: 0 – 12	Tries: 2 (53', 77') Dane Gagai; 1 (9') Valentine Holmes; Goals: 3/3 Johnathan Thurston (11', 54', 78')

ANZ Stadium, Sydney
Attendance: 82,259
Referee: Matt Cecchin, Gerard Sutton
Player of the Match: Josh Jackson

== Game III ==
Wednesday, July 12, 2017
8:15 pm

Queensland	22 – 6	New South Wales
Tries: Valentine Holmes (15', 27', 60') 3 Jarrod Wallace (67') 1 Goals: Cameron Smith 3/5 (17', 28', 68')	1st: 12 - 0; 2nd: 10 - 6	Tries: 1 (48') Josh Dugan; Goals: 1/1 James Maloney (49')

Suncorp Stadium, Brisbane
Attendance: 52,540
Referee: Matt Cecchin, Gerard Sutton
Player of the Match: Cameron Smith

== Teams ==
=== New South Wales Blues ===
Position	Game 1	Game 2	Game 3
Fullback	James Tedesco		
Wing	Brett Morris		
Centre	Josh Dugan		
Centre	Jarryd Hayne		
Wing	Blake Ferguson		
Five-eighth	James Maloney		
Halfback	Mitchell Pearce		
Prop	Aaron Woods		
Hooker	Nathan Peats		
Prop	Andrew Fifita		
Second row	Boyd Cordner (c)		
Second row	Josh Jackson		
Lock	Tyson Frizell		
Interchange	David Klemmer		
Interchange	Wade Graham		
Interchange	Jake Trbojevic		
Interchange	Jack Bird		
Coach	Laurie Daley		

1 - The collapses in Game 2 and Game 3 ended up costing coach Laurie Daley his job, bringing his tenure for the Blues to an end after 5 years. He was replaced by Brad Fittler.

2 - The series was Boyd Cordner's first as captain after Paul Gallen retired from State of Origin in 2016.

3 - It was the first time since the 1996 Series that New South Wales maintained the same 17 players in the same positions for all 3 games.

=== Queensland Maroons ===
Position	Game 1	Game 2	Game 3
Fullback	Darius Boyd	Billy Slater	
Wing	Corey Oates	Valentine Holmes	
Centre	Will Chambers		
Centre	Justin O'Neill	Darius Boyd	Michael Morgan
Wing	Dane Gagai		
Five-eighth	Anthony Milford	Johnathan Thurston	Cameron Munster
Halfback	Cooper Cronk		
Prop	Dylan Napa		
Hooker	Cameron Smith (c)		
Prop	Nate Myles	Jarrod Wallace	
Second row	Josh Papalii	Gavin Cooper	
Second row	Matt Gillett		
Lock	Josh McGuire		
Interchange	Michael Morgan		Ben Hunt
Interchange	Sam Thaiday	Josh Papalii	
Interchange	Aidan Guerra	Coen Hess	
Interchange	Jacob Lillyman	Tim Glasby	
Coach	Kevin Walters		

1 - 2017 was Cameron Smith's last origin series for the Maroons, his 42 games since 2003 the most for any player from either state.

== Player Debuts ==
=== Game 1 ===
- Cap no. 266, Nathan Peats
- Cap no. 267, Jake Trbojevic
- Cap no. 186, Anthony Milford
- Cap no. 187, Dylan Napa

=== Game 2 ===
- Cap no. 188, Valentine Holmes
- Cap no. 189, Jarrod Wallace
- Cap no. 190, Coen Hess
- Cap no. 191, Tim Glasby

=== Game 3 ===
- Cap no. 192, Cameron Munster
- Cap no. 193, Ben Hunt

== Residents ==
May 7, 2017

Queensland Residents	36 – 6	New South Wales Residents

Langlands Park, Brisbane

== Under 20s ==
May 31, 2017

Queensland U20s	16 – 30	New South Wales U20s

Suncorp Stadium, Brisbane

== Under 18s ==
June 21, 2017

New South Wales U18s	35 – 28	Queensland U18s

ANZ Stadium, Sydney

== Women's Interstate Challenge ==
23 July 2017

New South Wales	22 – 6	Queensland

WIN Stadium, Wollongong
