= Corey Oates =

Australian rugby league footballer

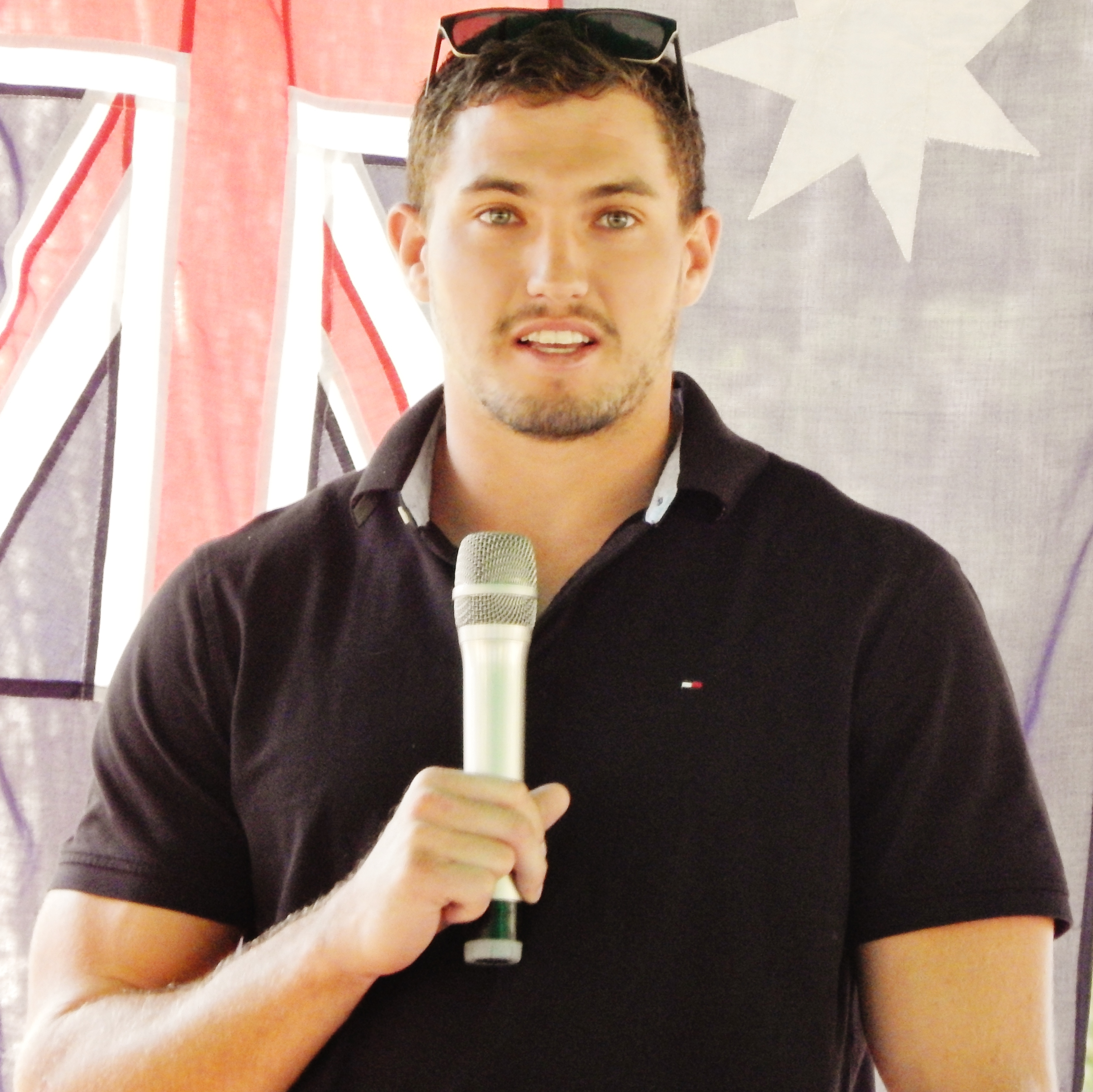

Personal information
- Born: 20 October 1994 (age 32) Biloela, Queensland, Australia
- Height: 192 cm (6 ft 4 in)
- Weight: 105 kg (16 st 7 lb)

Playing information
- Position: Wing
Club
Years	Team	Pld	T	G	FG	P
2013–24	Brisbane Broncos	216	121	0	0	484
Representative
Years	Team	Pld	T	G	FG	P
2016–22	Queensland	9	3	0	0	12
- Source: As of 5 September 2024

Corey Oates (born 20 October 1994) is a former Australian professional rugby league footballer and radio presenter. He played as winger for the Brisbane Broncos in the National Rugby League (NRL). He currently co-hosts the KIIS 97.3 breakfast radio program "Robin, Kip with Corey Oates" alongside Robin Bailey and Kip Wightman.

Oates also represented Queensland in the State of Origin series.

== Background ==
Oates was born in Biloela, Queensland, Australia but was raised in the small town of Baralaba.

He played his junior football for the Baralaba Panthers and attended St Brendan's College in Yeppoon before being signed by the Brisbane Broncos.

He begain his radio career in late 2024 as co-host of KIIS 97.3's breakfast radio program, alongside Robin Bailey and Kip Wightman - which became titled "Robyn, Kip now with Corey Oates".

== Playing career ==
=== Early career ===
Oates played for the Brisbane Broncos NYC team in 2012–2013.

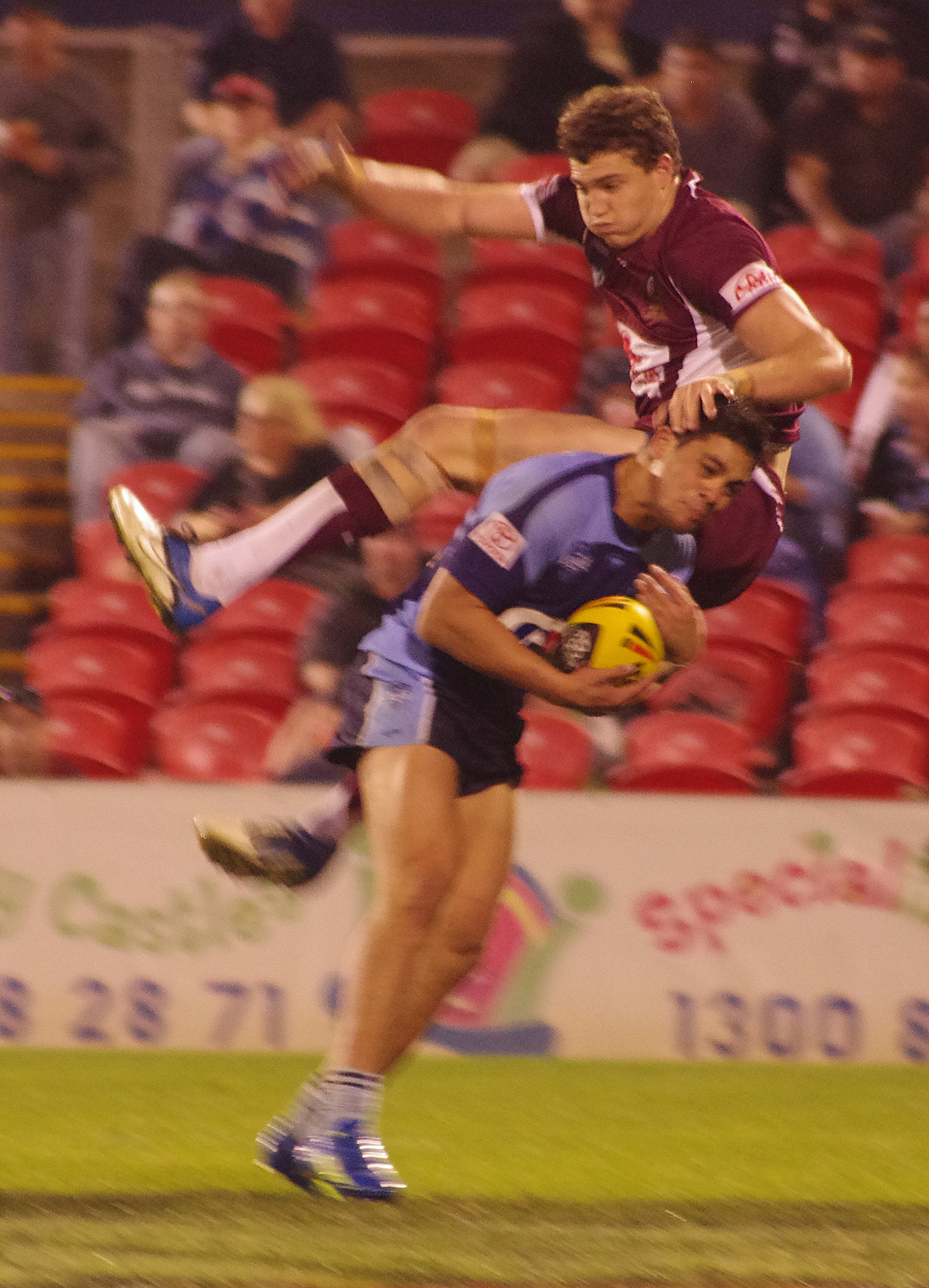
Oates playing for the Queensland under 20s in 2012

On 21 April 2012, Oates represented the Queensland Under 20s team against the New South Wales Under 20s, playing off the interchange bench in the 18–14 loss at Penrith Stadium.

In 2013 he continued playing for the Brisbane Broncos in the under 20s, and again represented the Queensland under 20s.

In Round 17 of the 2013 NRL season, Oates made his NRL debut for the Brisbane Broncos against the Melbourne Storm, coming off the interchange bench in Brisbane's 32–0 loss at AAMI Park. In his next match, in Round 18 against the Cronulla-Sutherland Sharks at Suncorp Stadium, Oates scored his first NRL career try in Brisbane's 19–18 loss. Oates finished his debut year in the NRL, playing in 9 matches and scoring 8 tries for the Brisbane club in the 2013 NRL season. Oates was named the 2013 Brisbane Broncos season's rookie of the year. On 27 August 2013, Oates was named at second-row in the 2013 NYC team of the year.

=== 2014 ===
Oates missed the first two matches of the season with a knee injury, returning in Round 3 against the Sydney Roosters, playing off the interchange bench in the 30–26 loss at Suncorp Stadium. On 18 July 2014, Oates was demoted to the Queensland Cup along with Jack Reed and Daniel Vidot by coach Anthony Griffin after breaching team protocol with a mid-week boozing session. Oates returned a week later in Round 20 against the Melbourne Storm, playing off the interchange bench in the 30–8 loss at Suncorp Stadium. Oates finished the 2014 NRL season with him playing in 20 matches and scoring 5 tries. On 9 October 2014, Oates extended his contract with the Brisbane club, keeping him at the club until the end of the 2017 season.

=== 2015 ===
In Round 9 against the Penrith Panthers, Oates scored the winning try with two minutes to go in Brisbane's 8–5 win at Suncorp Stadium. In Round 25, Oates scored a 95-metre try against the South Sydney Rabbitohs, fending off an attempted tackle from Dylan Walker in doing so in the 47–12 win at Sydney Football Stadium. Leading into Brisbane's 2015 finals campaign, Oates would edge out Lachlan Maranta for the left wing spot after spending most of the season reverting from the wing to the interchange bench. On 4 October 2015, Oates played in the 2015 NRL Grand Final against the North Queensland Cowboys, starting on the wing and scoring the first try of the match but later made a crucial defensive error on the final siren by running off his wing to tackle Michael Morgan with the ball who flicked the ball to the unmarked Kyle Feldt to tie up the scores at 16-all to send the match into golden point, during which Brisbane lost 17-16 after Cowboys captain Johnathan Thurston kicked the premiership sealing field goal for his club. Oates finished the 2015 NRL season with him playing in 25 matches and scoring 14 tries.

=== 2016 ===
On 12 January 2016, Oates was selected in the QAS Emerging Maroons squad. In February 2016, Oates was named in the Broncos 2016 NRL Auckland Nines squad, but was later ruled out. In Round 7 against the Newcastle Knights, Oates scored his first career hat trick of tries in Brisbane's 53–0 win at Suncorp Stadium. After showing some great try scoring form in the early rounds, Oates earn himself a wing spot for Queensland in the 2016 State of Origin series. On 1 June 2016 Oates made his debut for Queensland in Game 1, on the wing in the Maroons low scoring 6–4 win at ANZ Stadium. In Game 2 of the series, Oates scored his first try for the Maroons in the series winning 26–16 victory at Suncorp Stadium. Oates finished the 2016 NRL season as Brisbane's highest tryscorer with 18 tries in 22 matches. On 20 September 2016, Oates was added to the Australia Kangaroos 2016 Four Nations train-on squad but later make the final 24-man squad.

=== 2017 ===
On 9 March 2017, Oates extended his contract with Brisbane to the end the 2018 NRL season. After another solid start to the season, Oates was selected for Queensland on the wing for Game 1 of the 2017 State of Origin series, scoring the Maroons only try in the shock 28–4 loss against New South Wales at Suncorp Stadium. Despite being the lone try scorer for Queensland, Oates was axed from the team for Game 2 in favour of Cronulla-Sutherland Sharks flyer Valentine Holmes in one of many omissions from the Maroons team. In late June 2017, Oates was hospitalised with a staph infection that was affecting his lower body and was sidelined for six weeks. Oates later made his return in Round 22 in the local derby match against the Gold Coast Titans, scoring a try in the 54-0 smashing win at Robina Stadium. In Brisbane's do-or-die semifinal match against the Penrith Panthers, After scoring a try early in the match, Oates was on the receiving end of a sickening head clash by an accidental shoulder by teammate Anthony Milford and was knocked unconscious while they attempted to stop an attacking raid close to their tryline in the Broncos' 13–6 victory at Suncorp Stadium. After suffering the heavy knock, Oates was later cleared of concussion and played in Brisbane's season-ending 30-0 preliminary final loss against the Melbourne Storm at AAMI Park. Oates finished the 2017 NRL season with him playing in 21 matches and scoring 15 tries for Brisbane.

=== 2018 ===
Before the start of the season, Oates made a request to switch from the wing to second-row due to his bigger frame being more suited to the forwards. In March 2018, Oates who was off contract at the end of the year, attracted the attention of North Queensland and South Sydney for his signature and a promise of a permanent place in the forwards. In Round 3 against the Wests Tigers, Oates played his 100th NRL career match in Brisbane's 9–7 win at Campbelltown Stadium. Oates returned to State of Origin arena for game 3 after captain Greg Inglis was ruled out injured, playing on the wing in the 18–12 victory for Queensland. In Round 25 against the Manly-Warringah Sea Eagles, Oates scored four tries in the 48–16 win at Suncorp Stadium. Oates finished the 2018 NRL season with him playing in 23 matches and being the club's highest tryscorer with 18 tries. On 4 December 2018, Oates agreed to a one-year extension to stay with Brisbane for the 2019 season after many months of speculation of where he would go beyond the end of the year.

=== 2019 ===
Oates made 22 appearances for Brisbane in the 2019 NRL season as the club finished 8th on the table and qualified for the finals. Oates played in the club's elimination final against Parramatta which Brisbane lost 58–0 at the new Western Sydney Stadium. The defeat was, at the time, the worst in Brisbane's history and also the biggest finals defeat in history. Oates finished the year as the club's top try scorer with 13 tries.

=== 2020 ===
Oates played 14 games for Brisbane in the 2020 NRL season as the club finished last on the table and claimed the wooden spoon for the first time in their history.

=== 2021 ===
Oates played 14 games for Brisbane in the 2021 NRL season scoring four tries as the club missed the finals.

=== 2022 ===
In round 5 of the 2022 NRL season, Oates scored a hat-trick for Brisbane in their 24–20 loss to the Sydney Roosters. In round 10, Oates scored two tries in a 38–0 victory over Manly. In round 16, Oates scored two tries for Brisbane in their 40–26 loss against North Queensland in the Queensland derby.

Oates would return to the Origin arena in the Game 3 Suncorp decider after North Queensland winger Murray Taulagi was ruled out due to COVID-19, helping Queensland win 22–12. In round 19, Oates scored two tries for Brisbane in a 36–14 victory over Parramatta. Oates played a total of 22 games throughout the year for Brisbane scoring 22 tries to finish as the clubs top try scorer for the season.

=== 2023 ===
Following Brisbane's round 2 victory over arch-rivals North Queensland, it was revealed that Oates had suffered a broken jaw during the match after a shoulder charge from Scott Drinkwater, which resulted in Drinkwater being suspended for 3 games. Oates was later ruled out for two months. Oates played a total of nine games for Brisbane in the 2023 NRL season. Oates was named as 18th man for Brisbane in the 2023 NRL Grand Final in which they lost 26-24. On 21 November, Oates re-signed with the Brisbane club for the 2024 season.

=== 2024 ===
Oates played 16 games in the 2024 season. On 10 October 2024, Oates announced his retirement from the NRL. Oates had decided against testing the open market and cited his main reasons for retiring was to spend more time with his family and injuries.

== Post playing ==
After retiring from the NRL, Oates became co-host of KIIS 97.3's breakfast radio program which became titled "Robin, Kip now with Corey Oates", alongside Robin Bailey and Kip Wightman .

== Statistics ==
Year	Team	Games	Tries	Pts
2013	Brisbane Broncos	9	8	32
2014	Brisbane Broncos	20	5	20
2015	Brisbane Broncos	25	14	56
2016	Brisbane Broncos	22	18	72
2017	Brisbane Broncos	21	16	64
2018	Brisbane Broncos	23	18	72
2019	Brisbane Broncos	22	13	52
2020	Brisbane Broncos	14	2	8
2021	Brisbane Broncos	14	4	16
2022	Brisbane Broncos	22	20	80
2023	Brisbane Broncos	9	0	0
2024	Brisbane Broncos	16	3	12
	Totals	216	121	484
