= Karen Shaw =

American artist (1941–2025)

- Born: October 25, 1941; New York City, U.S.
- Died: March 27, 2025 (aged 83); Holmes, New York, U.S.
- Known for: Conceptual art, semiotics, collage
- Movement: Neo-dada, conceptual art
- Awards: NEA fellowship, New York Foundation for the Arts fellowship
- Website: karenshaw100.com

Karen Shaw (October 25, 1941 – March 27, 2025) was an American conceptual and visual artist and curator. She is best known for developing a system which assigns linguistic meaning to numbers and using it in many of her works. She has also been noted for her artwork dealing with sports and gender. Her work has been described as Neo-Dadaist.

Shaw was curator of the Islip Art Museum from 1983 to 2011.

== Early life and education ==
Karen Shaw was born in the Bronx, New York City, on October 25, 1941, to a secular Jewish family. She attended Hunter College at City University of New York, where she received a Bachelor of Fine Arts degree.

In the early 1970's, Shaw participated in an NBC study where two-digit numerical values were used to codify the effect of television violence on children. She cited this experience as having a significant influence on her artwork, giving her the reductionist idea of compressing complex meaning to numbers and statistics. She was also involved in the women's rights movement prior to her entry into the art world which influenced some of her later works.

== Work ==
=== Summantics ===
In 1976, Shaw won a short story contest overseen by Donald Barthelme in the New York Times. The contest was a work of experimental fiction, where Barthelme wrote half of a short story and challenged the public to complete the second half. Shaw was selected as the winner from 3,125 entries after incorporating an artistic process she termed "Summantics."

Much of Shaw's work contains instances of Summantics, whereby numerical values are assigned to letters based upon a simple codex: A=1, B=2 C=3, etc. Shaw composed a dictionary of thousands of words by hand based on this numerical summation. She then used her dictionary to compose more complex visual art pieces based on increasingly complex linguistic summantics. Her artwork was sometimes inspired by deriving words from every day objects such as ticket stubs or photographs, and in other cases she would take poetry by poets such as Rainier Maria Rilke, William Blake, John Keats, and Stéphane Mallarmé and reduce them to a value that represented the sum of the words.

For example, in Reckoning ± Rilke: Investigations into the Inequality of Translation, a Rilke poem is translated and the sum derived from the original subtracted from the sum of the translation, to assign a value to what is "lost" in translation. While Shaw stated that this method was originally partly a commentary on the modern obsession with quantifying complex phenomena and reducing them to numerical statistics, art critics have praised the linguistic composition in her work for its aesthetic appeal and capacity to invoke poetic meaning.

Although many have noted the similarity of the method to Gematria and Kabbalah, Shaw developed Summantics before learning about Gematria.

=== Influences ===
Shaw has named Marcel Duchamp and the Dada movement as her most significant influences, in particular for their use of humor in artwork. Shaw's work has been praised for its use of humor. She has also cited Duane Michals, Jasper Johns, and Alfred Jensen as influences. Her work was also repeatedly compared to the work of Hanne Darboven, but Shaw does not consider Darboven as an influence.

=== Publications ===
- Big Jewish Book: Poems and Other Visions of the Jews from Tribal Times to the Present. Doubleday. 1979. ISBN 978-0-385-02630-7
- Body Power/Power Play. University of Michigan. 2002. ISBN 978-3-7757-1235-4
- Martha Wilson Sourcebook: 40 Years of Reconsidering Performance, Feminism, Alternative Spaces. Independent Curators International (ICI). 2011. ISBN 978-0-916365-85-1
- Remix : Selections from the International Collage Center. Museum. 2012. ISBN 978-0-615-67515-2
- Common Practice Basketball. Skira. 2021. ISBN 978-88-572-4397-9

Her work was also published in TYPO, a journal published by Derek Pell's Black Scat Books self-described as a "Journal of Lettrism, Surrealist Semantics, & Constrained Design."

=== Teaching ===
Shaw has taught art at a number of universities, including as a lecturer and twice as a visiting artist at Princeton University, the University of Tennessee - Knoxville, Southampton College, Hofstra University, Moore College of Art, Columbia College in Chicago, and Northern Illinois University.

== Select artworks ==
- ABC's + ENHANCE + POET'S + WRITING + ESTABLISHING + COMMUNICATION. = 525, 1977, Yale University Art Gallery
- Everything I Know About the Number 112 Linguistically Speaking: An Entymological* Collection, 1978, White Columns
- Untitled, 1980, Antwerp Museum of Modern Art
- #75 (Mantegna - Martin), 1981, Herbert F. Johnson Museum of Art, Cornell University
- Entomological-Etymological Specimens, 1993, Brooklyn Public Library

== Exhibitions ==
Shaw's work has appeared in numerous exhibitions in the United States, France, Germany, Switzerland, and Guatemala. Some of the notable exhibitions that featured her work were two exhibitions at the Museum of Modern Art (MoMA) in New York: New York Avant-Garde/Works and Projects of the Seventies in 1977 and The Detective Show in 1978, an art installation at the White Columns gallery in New York in 1978, the MATRIX exhibition at the Wadsworth Atheneum Museum of Art from late 1979 to early 1980, and an exhibition at the Pavel Zoubok Gallery titled "The New Collage" in 2006.

== Personal life and death ==
Shaw married Ronald Shaw shortly after high school, and they remained together for 61 years until his death in 2020. She had two sons, David and Stephan. Shaw died from cancer at her home in Holmes, New York, on March 27, 2025, at the age of 83.
