= Anthony Milford =

Samoan rugby league footballer (born 1994)

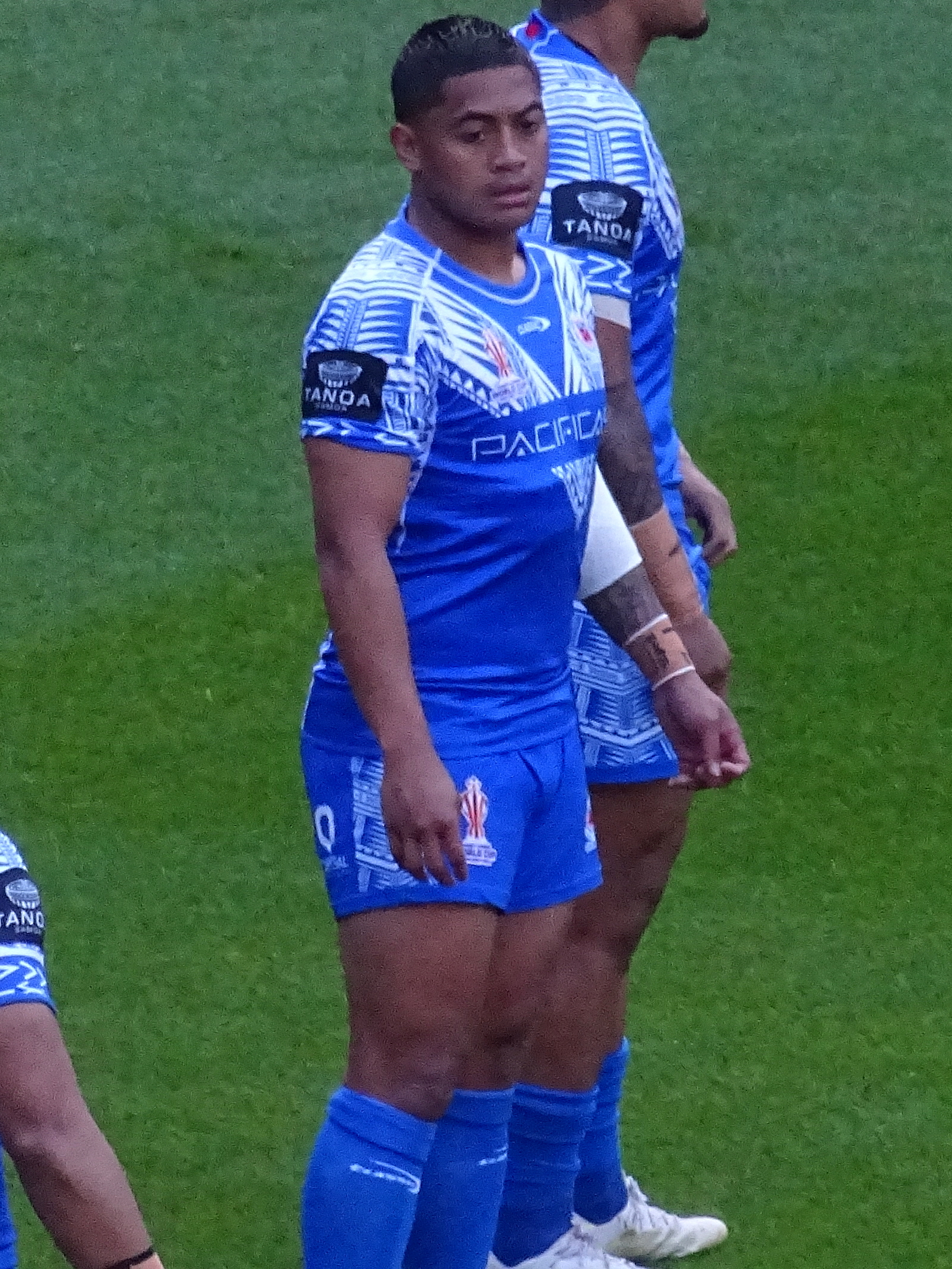

Personal information
- Born: 11 July 1994 (age 32) Auckland, New Zealand
- Height: 177 cm (5 ft 10 in)
- Weight: 90 kg (14 st 2 lb)

Playing information
- Position: Five-eighth, Fullback
Club
Years	Team	Pld	T	G	FG	P
2013–14	Canberra Raiders	42	21	3	2	92
2015–21	Brisbane Broncos	151	49	33	13	275
2022	Newcastle Knights	13	0	8	0	16
2023–24	Dolphins	13	3	0	0	12
	Total	219	73	44	15	395
Representative
Years	Team	Pld	T	G	FG	P
2013–24	Samoa	14	4	15	0	46
2014	Prime Ministers XIII	1	1	0	0	4
2017–18	Queensland	2	0	0	0	0
- Source: As of 27 October 2024
- Relatives: Francis Molo (cousin); Michael Molo (cousin)

Anthony Milford (born 11 July 1994) is a Samoan international rugby league footballer who plays as a five-eighth for the Souths Logan Magpies in the Intrust Super Cup.

Milford has previously played for the Newcastle Knights, the Brisbane Broncos and the Canberra Raiders in the NRL. He has also co-captained Samoa, and represented the Australian Prime Minister's XIII and the Queensland Maroons. He has also played as a fullback and halfback in his career.

== Background ==
Milford was born in Auckland, New Zealand, and raised in Brisbane, Queensland, Australia. He is of Samoan descent. He is the cousin of St. George Illawarra Dragons players Francis Molo and Michael Molo.

== Playing career ==
=== Early years ===
Milford began playing his junior rugby league for the Souths Juniors in Acacia Ridge. During his teenage years, he attended Forest Lake State High School and St Peter Claver College in Ipswich, and was selected for the Queensland and Australian Under-15 Schoolboys in 2009. While at the school he represented the Under-15 Queensland and Australian Schoolboys' sides in 2009. In 2010, Milford represented the Queensland Under-16s, while playing for Souths Logan Magpies. Milford graduated from their rugby league program in 2011. In 2012, Milford represented Queensland Under-18s, playing halfback in their 24–18 win over New South Wales.

Milford joined the Canberra Raiders in 2012, leading their SG Ball side to the Grand Final, which they lost 42–20 to the Balmain Tigers. Later that year, at just 17 years old, Milford debuted for the Raiders Under-20s team. Milford played 14 games, scoring 13 tries and helped the Raiders make the Grand Final, in which they lost to the Wests Tigers 46–6. In September 2012, Milford was set to be named in the Junior Kiwis side to face the Junior Kangaroos, before he officially pledged his allegiance to his birth country of Australia. In November 2012, he was rewarded with a new contract at the Canberra Raiders, keeping him in Canberra until the end of 2014. In December 2012, Milford was named in Queensland's 2013 Junior Emerging Origin Squad. Milford played 20 games, scored 20 tries, kicked 64 goals and 1 field goal for 209 points in his U20s career from 2012 to 2013.

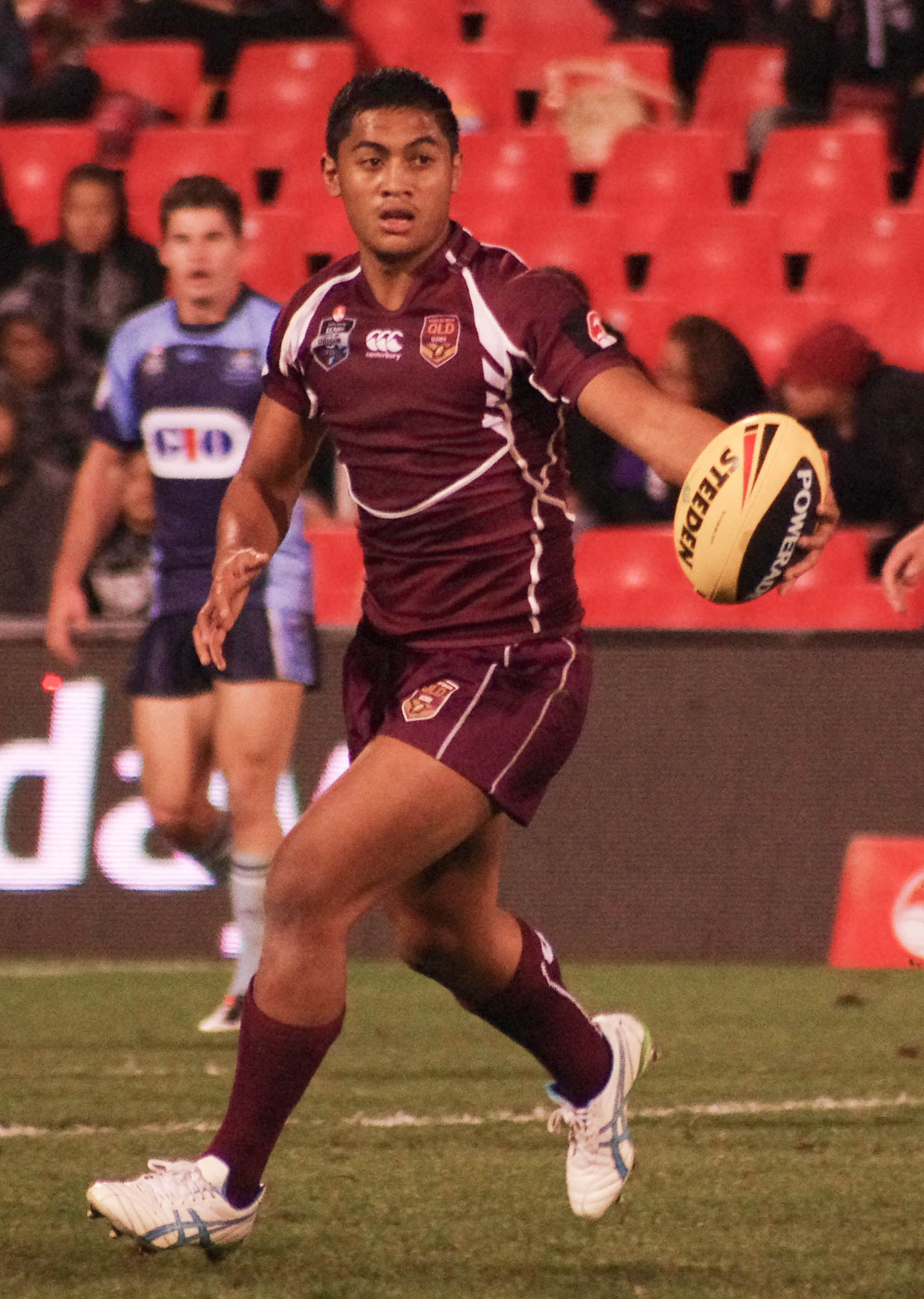
Milford playing for the Queensland U-20s in 2013

=== 2013 ===
In 2013, Milford trained with Canberra's NRL squad in the pre-season, despite still having two years left of NYC eligibility. In Round 5, Milford made his NRL debut for the Canberra Raiders against the Sydney Roosters, playing off the interchange bench in Canberra's 24–22 comeback win at Canberra Stadium. In Round 10 against the Cronulla-Sutherland Sharks, Milford scored his first and second NRL career tries in Canberra's 30–20 loss at Remondis Stadium. Milford was named captain and halfback of Queensland Under-20s State of Origin team, scoring a try in the 36–12 loss to the New South Wales Under-20s at Penrith Stadium.

On 31 August, Milford and Canberra Raiders teammate Josh Papalii were fined by the club for an alleged drinking incident two days before Canberra's 50–16 loss to the New Zealand Warriors. Milford finished his debut season in the NRL being named the Raiders Rookie of the Year with him playing in 18 matches and scoring nine tries. Milford was a nominee for the Rookie of the Year. Milford played for Samoa national rugby league team in the 2013 Rugby League World Cup, playing in all of their four matches, scoring one try and kicking nine goals. Milford made his Samoan international debut against New Zealand at fullback kicking 2 goals in Samoa's 42–24 loss at Halliwell Jones Stadium. Milford scored his first international try against France in Samoa's 22–6 win. Following the World Cup, On 27 November 2013, Milford signed a two-year contract (worth $900,000) with the Brisbane Broncos for the 2015 and 2016 seasons, due to family reasons.

=== 2014 ===
Early in the 2014 NRL season, Milford was being pursued by the Canberra Raiders. Coach Ricky Stuart was keen to keep him in the Nation's Capital; however, Milford decided to stick with the contract he signed in 2013 to join the Brisbane Broncos. In May, Milford was named for the Queensland Under-20s squad to play against the New South Wales under-20s, Milford played at five-eighth in QLD's 30–8 loss at Penrith Stadium. In June, Milford was named in the QLD Maroons 22-man squad for Game 2 to be selected for the final interchange bench spot but New Zealand Warriors Forward Jacob Lillyman ended up being selected for the final spot over Milford. Milford finished the 2014 NRL season with him playing 23 matches, scoring 12 tries, kicking three goals and kicking two field goals in his last year with Canberra. On 9 September 2014, Milford was selected in the Australia Kangaroos 2014 Four Nations train-on squad, but later didn't make the final 24-man squad. On 12 October 2014, Milford played at five-eighth for Prime Minister's XIII against Papua New Guinea, scoring a try in the 34–16 win at Kokopo.

=== 2015 ===
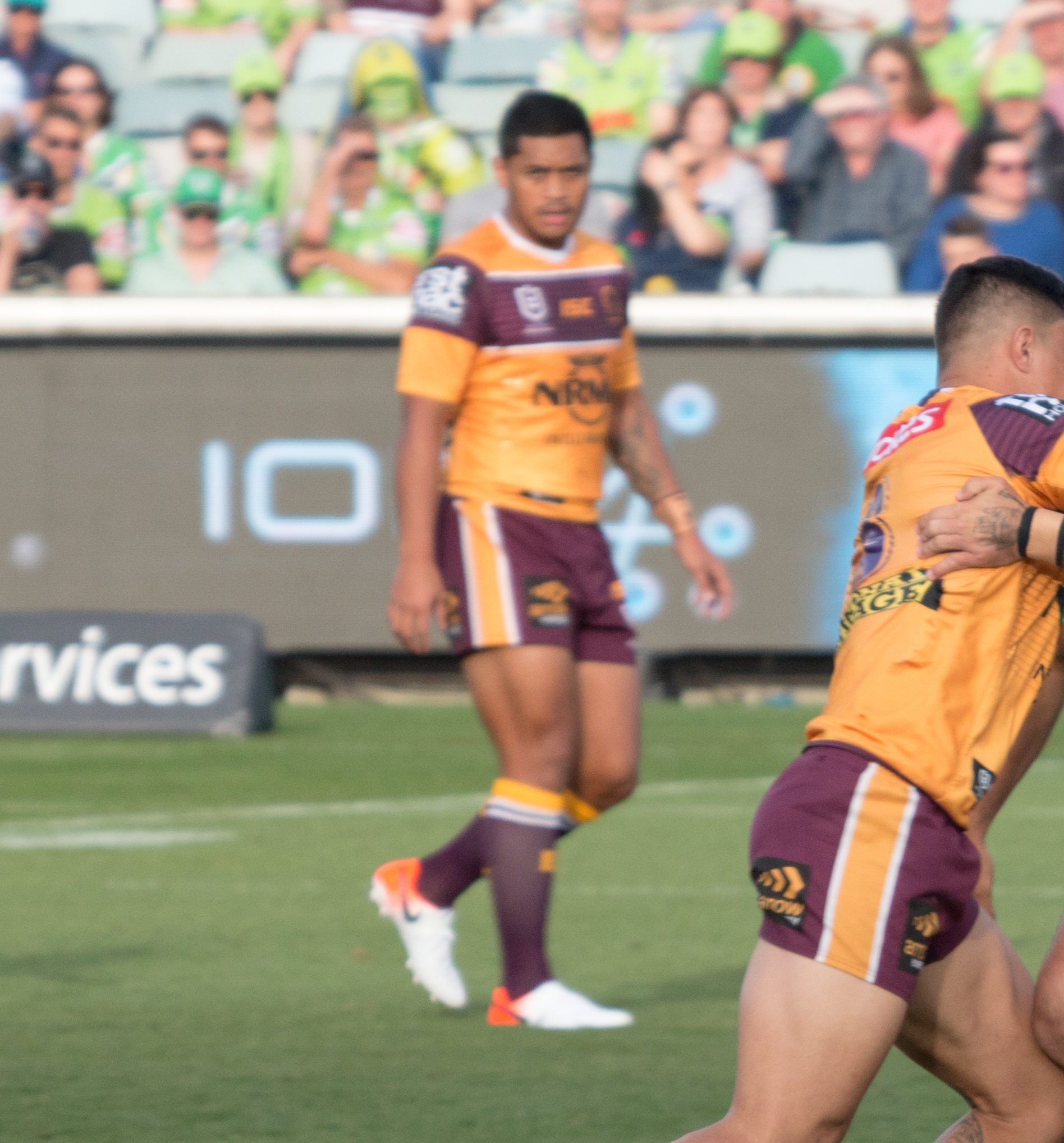
Milford playing for Brisbane in 2019

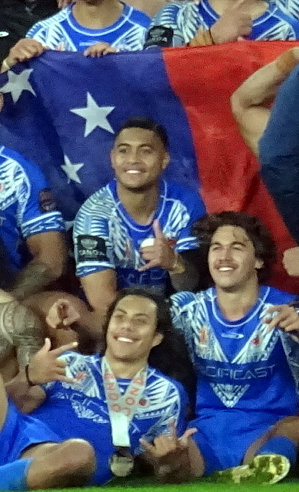
Milford alongside Jarome Luai and Chanel Harris-Tavita celebrating 2021 RLWC semi-final victory over England

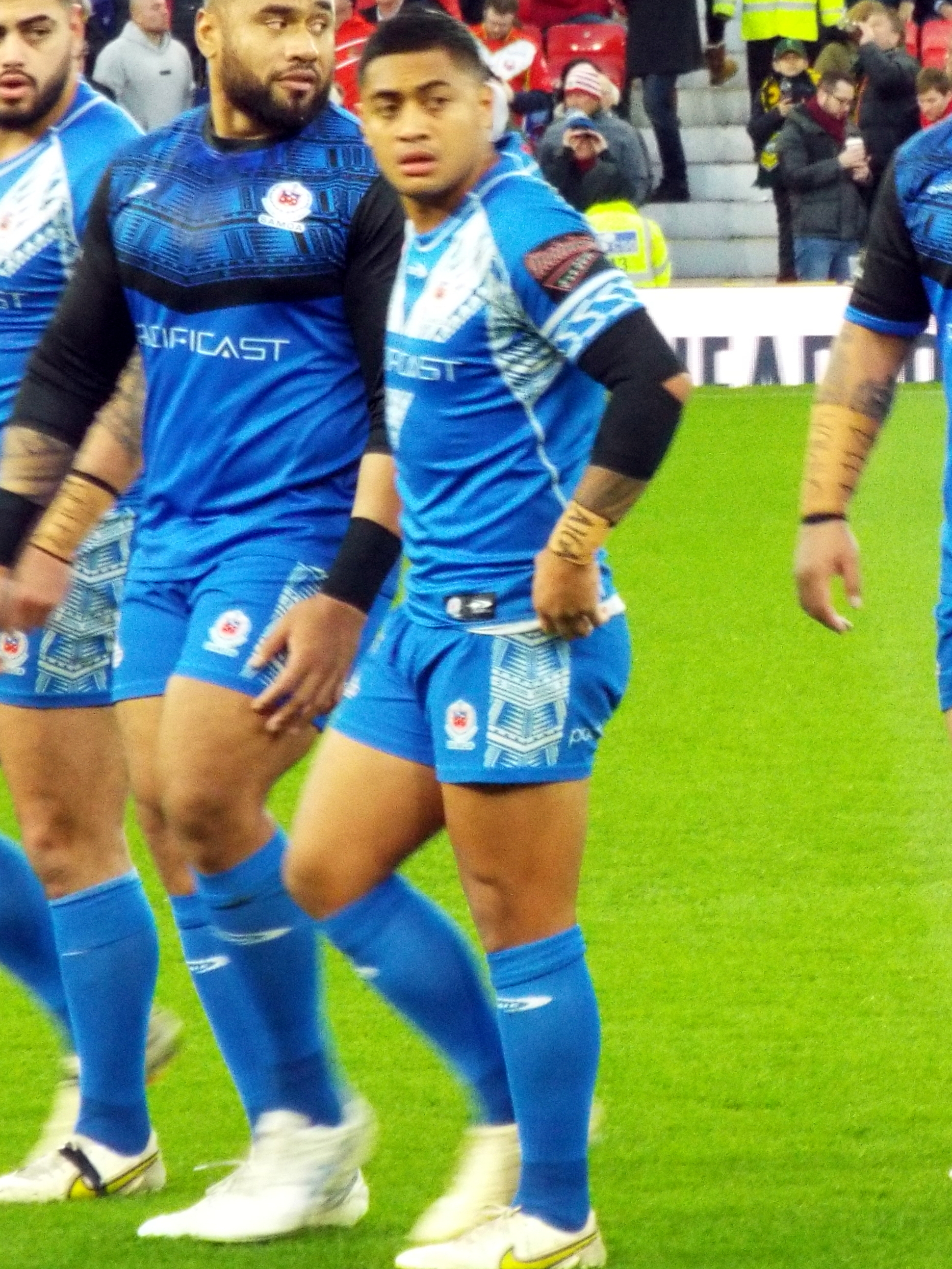
Milford warming up for Samoa ahead of the 2021 RLWC Final

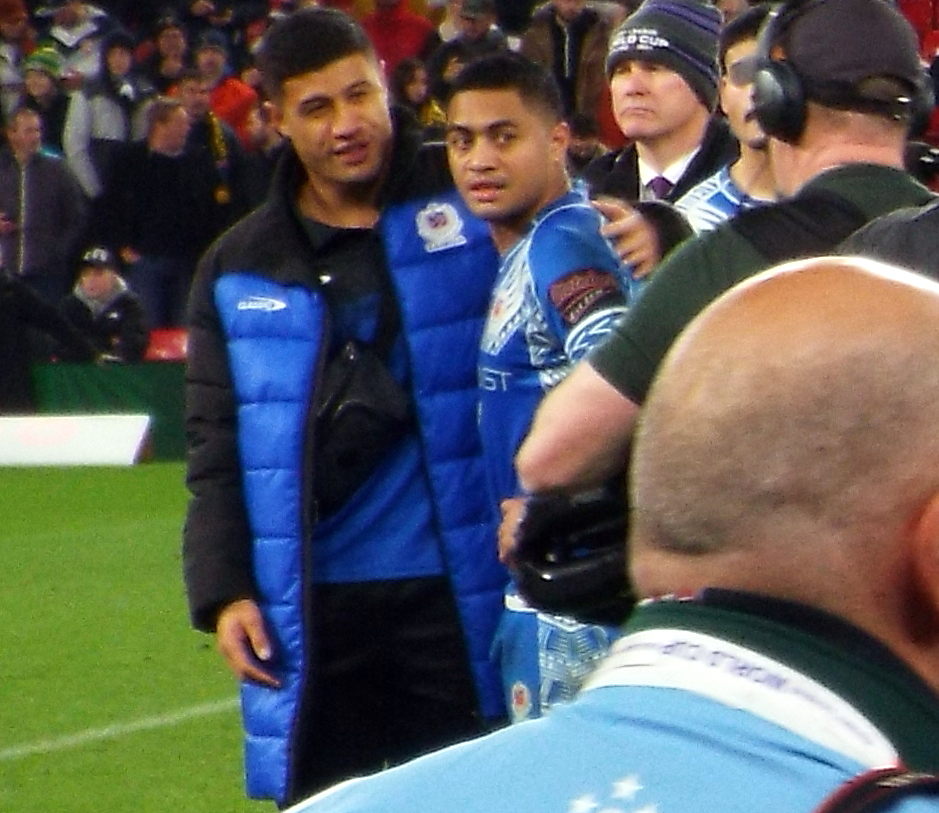
Fa'amanu Brown consoling Milford after losing the 2021 RLWC Final against Australia in 2022

On 21 January 2015, Milford was named in Brisbane's 2015 Auckland Nines squad. In Round 1 of the 2015 NRL season, Milford made his club debut for Brisbane at five-eighth against the South Sydney Rabbitohs in Brisbane's 36–6 loss at Suncorp Stadium. In Round 5 against the Gold Coast Titans, Milford scored his first and second club tries for Brisbane in the 26–16 win at Robina Stadium.

On 4 October 2015, Milford played in the Broncos 2015 NRL Grand Final against the North Queensland Cowboys, playing at five-eighth in the heartbreaking 17–16 golden-point extra-time loss. He finished off the 2015 season having played in all Brisbane's 27 matches, scoring 13 tries, kicking 3 goals and kicking 3 field goals.

=== 2016 ===
On 12 January, Milford was selected in the QAS Emerging Maroons squad. On 4 February 2016, Milford, along with eight other members of the Queensland Emerging squad were banned from Queensland State of Origin selection for 12 months after breaking team curfew. In Round 4 against the North Queensland Cowboys, in the Grand Final rematch, Milford kicked a field goal from 40 metres out to win the match for Brisbane 21–20 in golden point extra time, a redemption victory for Brisbane after the previous year's heartbreaking 2015 Grand Final extra-time loss. In Round 7 against the Newcastle Knights, Milford scored his first career hat-trick in a masterful performance in Brisbane's 53–0 flogging win at Suncorp Stadium. On 20 September 2016, Milford was added to the Australia Kangaroos 2016 Four Nations train-on squad but later missed out on making the final 24-man squad. On 28 September 2016, Milford won the Peter Frilingos Headline Moment of the Year award at the Dally M Awards, his match winning field goal in golden point extra time in Round 4 in the Grand Final rematch against the North Queensland Cowboys. Milford finished his solid 2016 NRL season with him playing in all of the Broncos 26 matches, scoring 14 tries, kicking eight goals and kicking four field goals.

=== 2017 ===
In February, Milford was selected in Brisbane's 2017 NRL Auckland Nines squad.

In Round 8, Milford was instrumental in the controversial 25–24 win over the South Sydney Rabbitohs, with a controversial try assist and a dubious 25-metre field goal. After the match, Tony Archer admitted the referees should have called held when Milford failed to ground the ball. On 5 May 2017, Milford extended his contract with the Broncos to the end of the 2021, with him set to be the first million-dollar Brisbane player after the Melbourne Storm were keen to lure him away from Brisbane.

On 6 May 2017, Milford played for Samoa in the test against England, starting at five-eighth, scoring a try and kicking one goal in the 30–10 loss at Campbelltown Stadium.

Due to main Queensland playmaker Johnathan Thurston sidelined with injury, Milford beat the likes of Michael Morgan, Daly Cherry-Evans and Cameron Munster to the vacant halves spot for Game 1 of the 2017 State of Origin series. On 31 May 2017, Milford his State of Origin debut for Queensland at five-eighth, showing some dazzling footwork and strong defence before taken off the field in the 53rd minute due to a concussion in the 28–4 loss at Suncorp Stadium against New South Wales.

In Round 14 against the South Sydney Rabbitohs, Milford a suffered a shoulder injury during Brisbane's 24–18 win at Suncorp Stadium, and was expected to be sidelined for six weeks but returned early in Round 19 against the Newcastle Knights, scoring a try in the 34–22 win at Hunter Stadium. Milford finished the 2017 NRL season with him playing in 23 matches, scoring 7 tries and kicking 21 goals for Brisbane.

Milford who was in frame for either Australia or Samoa missed the 2017 Rugby League World Cup due to his shoulder injury.

=== 2018 ===
In Game 1 of the 2018 State of Origin series, Milford was a late inclusion on the interchange bench after the retiring seasoned fullback Billy Slater was ruled out through injury and Michael Morgan filled in his vacant spot in the Maroons 22–12 loss at Melbourne Cricket Ground. On 23 June 2018, Milford played for Samoa against Tonga in the 2018 Polynesian Cup, playing at fullback and co-captaining the team alongside Joseph Leilua in the 38–22 loss at Campbelltown Stadium. Milford finished the 2018 NRL season having played 25 matches, scoring 6 tries and kicking 1 field goal for Brisbane. On 6 October 2018, Milford was awarded the Paul Morgan Medal as the Broncos Player of the Year.

=== 2019 ===
For the first 14 rounds of the 2019 NRL season, Milford started at five-eighth. In round 15, he swapped positions with Darius Boyd and moved to fullback in Brisbane's game against the Newcastle Knights.

Milford made 24 appearances for Brisbane in the 2019 NRL season as the club finished 8th on the table and qualified for the finals. Milford played in the club's elimination final against Parramatta which Brisbane lost 58–0 at the new Western Sydney Stadium.

=== 2020 ===
Milford played 13 games for Brisbane in the 2020 NRL season as the club suffered their worst ever year both on and off the field culminating in the club's first wooden spoon.

=== 2021 ===
On 1 July, Milford was informed by Brisbane that his contract would not be renewed at the end of the 2021 NRL season. This followed after numerous poor performances by Milford in the previous couple of years including the 2021 NRL season where he was demoted from the Brisbane side on a few occasions.

On 30 July 2021, Milford signed a one-year deal to join South Sydney starting in 2022. However, on 19 September 2021, Milford was arrested following an alleged assault in Fortitude Valley, Brisbane. He was charged with three counts of assault occasioning bodily harm one count of wilful damage. Consequently, the NRL refused in November 2021 to register Milford's South Sydney Rabbitohs contract due to criminal proceedings involving two assault charges of violence against women.

=== Newcastle Knights (2022) ===
Due to legal issues, Milford's contract with South Sydney fell through. In April, after his legal matters were finalised, the Newcastle Knights attempted to register a contract with Milford. The NRL granted a conditional registration to train with the Newcastle outfit while he completes educational and rehabilitative programs, but he would not be permitted to play before round 11, providing four weeks for the relevant programs and assessment to be completed.

In Milford's 200th NRL game, he was sent to the sin bin for a professional foul during Newcastle's 42–12 loss against Manly Warringah in Round 18.

On 18 July, the Newcastle club announced Milford would be moving on at the conclusion of the 2022 NRL season to return to Queensland, signing a two-year deal with the Dolphins.

In October 2022, Milford was named in the Samoa squad for the 2021 Rugby League World Cup. In the opening match of the 2021 Rugby League World Cup (RLWC), Milford was sent to the sin bin for an illegal shoulder charge on England's Sam Tomkins. Samoa went on to lose the match 60–6. Milford was later suspended for one game over the incident. Milford also played for Samoa in their 2021 RLWC final loss against Australia.

=== Dolphins (2023–24) ===
In round 4 of the 2023 NRL season, Milford made his club debut for the Dolphins against the Brisbane Broncos at Suncorp Stadium. In round 13, Milford scored his first try for the Dolphins in their 26–12 victory over the St. George Illawarra Dragons at Kayo Stadium. In total, Milford played eleven games and scored three tries for the Dolphins in 2023. On 24 December 2024, it was announced that Milford had been released from the Dolphins after his contract was not extended and he signed with Souths Logan Magpies the feeder team for the Brisbane Broncos.

== Statistics ==
Year	Team	Games	Tries	Goals	FGs	Pts
2013	Canberra Raiders	18	9			36
2014	Canberra Raiders	24	12	3	2	56
2015	Brisbane Broncos	27	13	3	3	61
2016	Brisbane Broncos	26	14	8	4	76
2017	Brisbane Broncos	23	7	22	1	73
2018	Brisbane Broncos	25	6		1	25
2019	Brisbane Broncos	24	6		3	27
2020	Brisbane Broncos	13	1			4
2021	Brisbane Broncos	13	2		1	9
2022	Newcastle Knights	13		8		16
2023	Dolphins	11	3			12
2024	Dolphins	2				
	Totals	219	73	44	15	395
