= Josh Papali'i =

Australia & Samoa international rugby league footballer

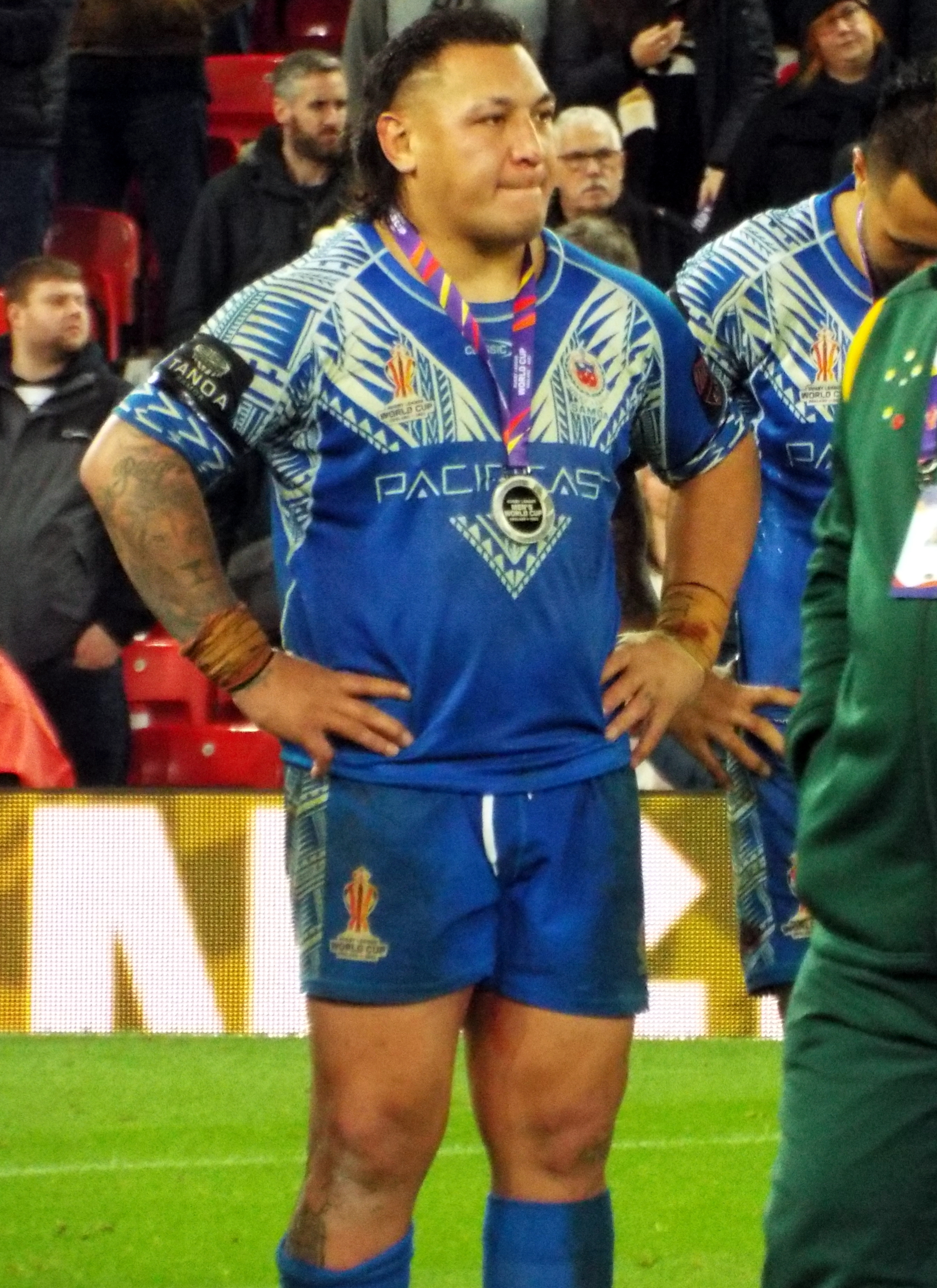

Personal information
- Full name: Joshua Papali'i
- Born: 13 May 1992 (age 34) Auckland, New Zealand

Playing information
- Height: 182 cm (6 ft 0 in)
- Weight: 116 kg (18 st 4 lb)
- Position: Prop, Second-row, Lock
Club
| Years | Team | Pld | T | G | FG | P |
|---|---|---|---|---|---|---|
| 2011–2026 | Canberra Raiders | 342 | 68 | 1 | 0 | 274 |
Representative
| Years | Team | Pld | T | G | FG | P |
| 2013–25 | Queensland | 24 | 3 | 0 | 0 | 12 |
| 2013–14 | Prime Minister's XIII | 2 | 1 | 0 | 0 | 4 |
| 2013–19 | Australia | 11 | 3 | 0 | 0 | 12 |
| 2017–25 | Samoa | 13 | 0 | 0 | 0 | 0 |

Joshua Papali'i (born 13 May 1992) is a former professional rugby league footballer who last played as a prop forward for the Canberra Raiders in the National Rugby League. He has played for both Australia and Samoa at international level. He is also the highest-capped Canberra Raiders player of all time.

He has also played at representative level for the Prime Minister's XIII and Queensland in the State of Origin series. He played as a second-row or lock earlier in his career.

== Background ==
Papali'i was born in Auckland, New Zealand. He is of Samoan and Cook Islands heritage. He moved to Australia at the age of 5 and was raised in Woodridge, Queensland.

He played his junior rugby league for Logan Brothers before being signed by the Canberra Raiders.

Papali'i played 20 matches for Raiders National Youth Competition side between 2010 and 2011. In 2010 Papalii represented the Queensland under 18 side and was selected in the Junior Kiwis' training squad, although he did not make the final side.

== Playing career ==
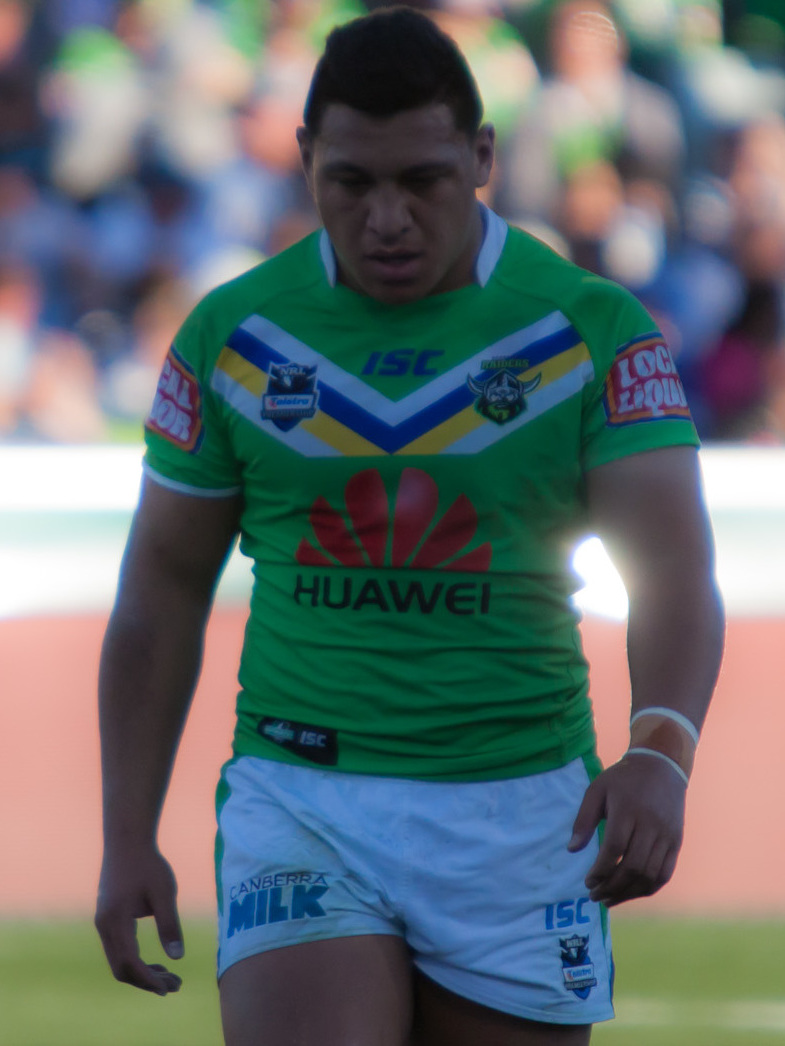
Papalii playing for the Raiders in 2012

=== 2011 ===
In Round 10, Papali'i made his NRL debut for the Canberra Raiders against the Melbourne Storm off the interchange bench in the Raiders 20–12 win at AAMI Park. In Round 14 against the Brisbane Broncos, Papali'i showed a promising performance in his young first grade career scoring two tries back to back to help lead a Raiders comeback, coming from 24–0 down to level the game 24–24, before losing in extra time 25–24 at Suncorp Stadium. Papali'i finished his debut year in the NRL with him playing in 14 matches and scoring 3 tries.

In October 2011, Papali'i was selected for the Junior Kiwis.

=== 2012 ===
In September, Papali'i pledged his representative allegiance to Queensland and Australia.

Papali'i finished the 2012 NRL season with him playing in all the Raiders 26 matches and scoring 7 tries. In December 2012, Papalii was named in Queensland's Emerging Origin Squad.

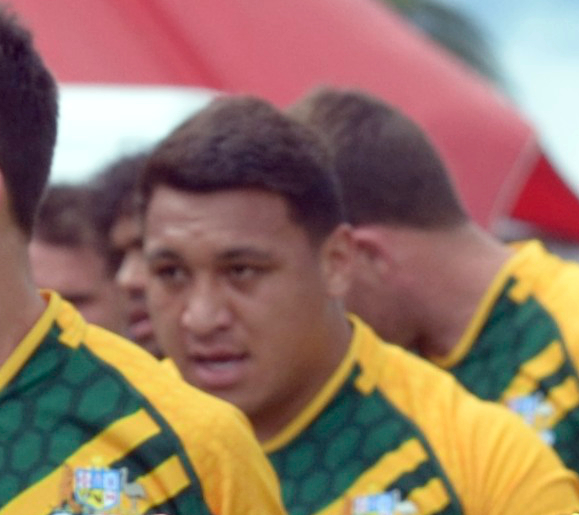
Papali'i playing for the Prime Minister's XIII in 2013

=== 2013 ===
On 23 February 2013, the Parramatta Eels signed Papali'i on a three-year deal from the start of 2014, but later, on 8 March 2013, Papali'i pulled out the Eels contract and re-signed a further 3 years with the Raiders to 2016 to remain close to family and friends. Papalii first gained selection for the Maroons for Game 2 of the 2013 State of Origin series, playing off the interchange bench in the Maroons 26–6 win at Suncorp Stadium. Papalii continued into Game 3, helping Queensland extend their record for consecutive series victories to eight. On 31 August 2013, Papali'i and fellow Canberra Raiders team-mate Anthony Milford were fined by the club for an alleged drinking incident two days before the Raiders 50–16 loss to the New Zealand Warriors at Mt Smart Stadium in Round 25. Papalii finished the 2013 NRL season with him playing in 21 NRL matches and scoring 3 tries for the Raiders.

On 29 September 2013, Papali'i played for Prime Minister's XIII, starting at second-row and scoring a try in the 50–10 win in Kokopo.

Papali'i earned selection in the Australia 24-man squad for the 2013 World Cup, playing in 4 matches and scoring 2 tries. Papali'i made his international debut for Australia against Fiji, starting at second-row and scoring a try in the 34–2 win at Langtree Park. Papali'i played off the interchange bench in Australia's 34–2 World Cup Final victory over New Zealand at Old Trafford. On 18 October 2013, Papali'i was robbed by 2 men at a Manchester nightclub ATM and had around £200 (about $385 in Australian Dollars) stolen from him.

=== 2014 ===
Papalii was selected for the Queensland Maroons team for Game 1 in the 100th State of Origin match at Suncorp Stadium off the interchange bench in the Maroons 12–8 loss. On 12 June, Papalii was involved in a road rage incident after he threw a one-litre bottle of moisturising cream at another motorist, who subsequently insisted on a public apology. The NRL club agreed to pay for the damage caused to the car of University of Canberra staff member Michael Tutalo, but said his lengthy list of demands, which included a face-to-face apology in front of the Canberra Times building in Fyshwick, were too much. The pair became involved in a heated exchange after Papalii allegedly cut off Mr Tutalo as he drove along Belconnen Way in Bruce. Papalii finished the 2014 NRL season with him playing in 19 matches and scoring 3 tries for the Raiders.

On 12 October 2014, Papalii played for Prime Minister's XIII, starting at prop in the 34–16 win in Kokopo.

On 14 October 2014, Papalii was selected for Australia in their 2014 Four Nations 24-man squad. Papalii played in 4 matches and scored a try in tournament. Papalii played off the interchange bench and scored a try in the Kangaroos 22–18 Four Nations final loss over New Zealand at Westpac Stadium.

=== 2015 ===
In July 2015, Papalii earned a recall to the Queensland squad for the Game 3 decider against New South Wales. He played off the interchange bench and scored a try in the record 52–6 win at Suncorp Stadium. In Round 22 against the Wests Tigers, Papalii played his 100th NRL game in the Raiders 20–18 loss at Canberra Stadium. He finished off 2015 having played in all the Raiders' 24 games and scored 8 tries.

On 8 September, Papalii was named the 2015 Prime Minister's XIII train-on squad but was later ruled out due to injury.

On 20 November, he re-signed with the Raiders on a 3-year contract to the end of the 2018 season.

=== 2016 ===
On 6 May 2016, Papalii played for Australia against New Zealand, starting at second-row in the 16–0 win at Hunter Stadium.

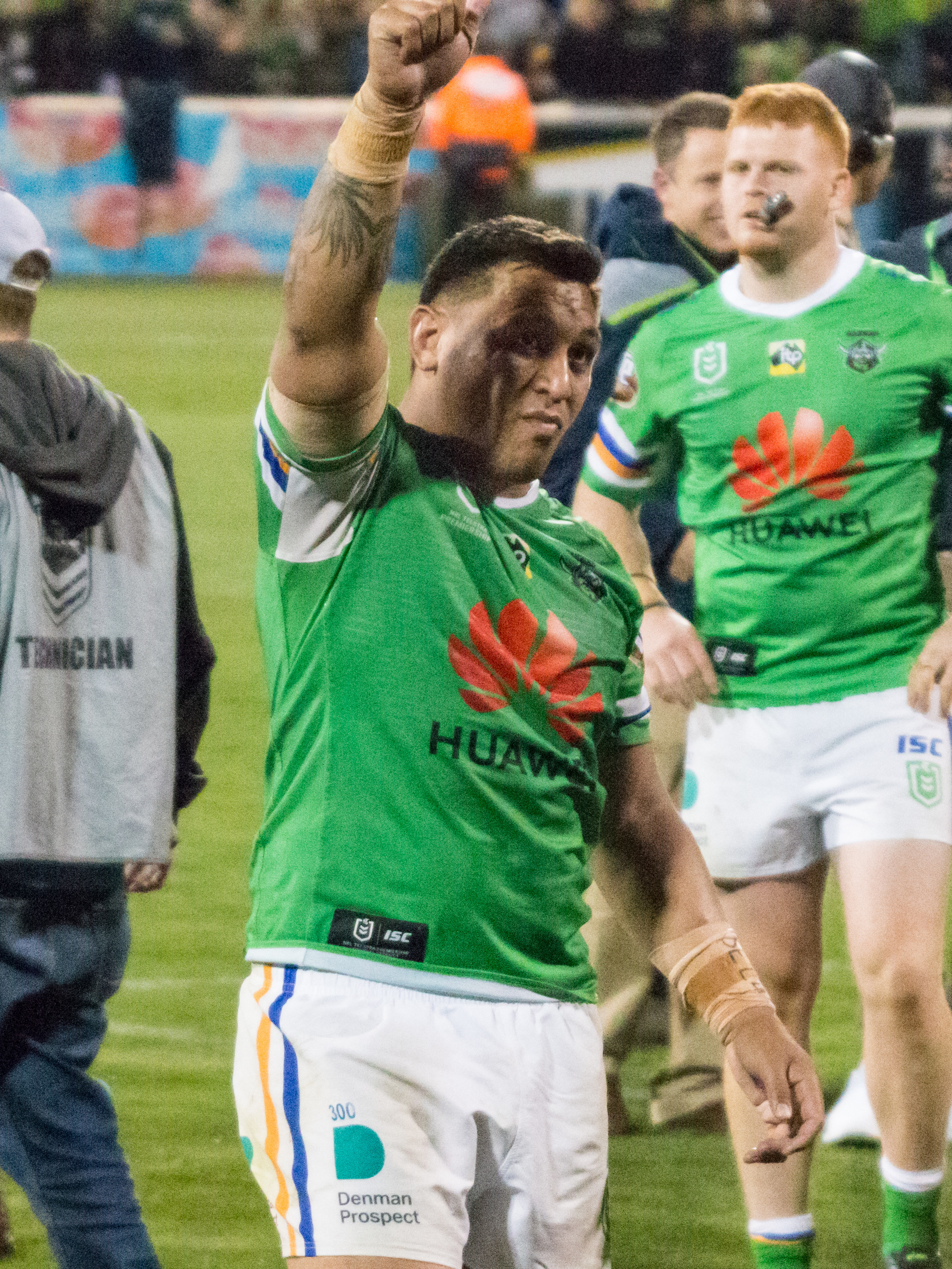
Papalii playing for the Raiders in 2019

For the 2016 State of Origin series, Papalii played in Game 1 and Game 2 off the interchange bench for the Maroons in their 2–1 series win. Papalii finished the 2017 NRL season with him playing in 25 matches and scoring 7 tries for the Raiders. On 19 September 2017, Papalii and Raiders hooker Josh Hodgson were named as the dual winners of the Raiders 2016 Player of the Year Mal Meninga Medal. On 4 October 2016, Papalii was selected in the Kangaroos 2016 Four Nations 24-man squad. Later on, 13 October 2016, Papalii withdrew himself from the squad due an ankle injury and was replaced by Manly-Warringah Sea Eagles player Jake Trbojevic.

=== 2017 ===
On 27 April 2017, Papalii was stood down by the Raiders for 1 match and the Kangaroos for the 2017 ANZAC Test after he was convicted of drink-driving after he bizarrely called triple 000 twice to report himself driving erratically in the early hours of 15 January 2017. The court heard Papalii was sprung after police received an anonymous triple-0 call to report a black Jeep driving on the wrong side of the road in Gungahlin about 2.15am and police got a second call to say the same car had pulled over near Hungry Jacks about 20 minutes later, officers approached the vehicle on a bike path on Gundaroo Drive soon after and asked Papalii, who was in the driver's seat, to get out of the car. They noticed he had bloodshot, watery eyes, his speech was slurred and he had the hiccups. Papalii was taken to the sobering up shelter. Police later discovered the emergency calls had been made from Papalii's phone. They said he told them he'd made the triple zero calls "to make a point". Papalii had a blood-alcohol reading of 0.123 just hours after he left the engagement party of Raiders captain Jarrod Croker.

Despite being dumped from the Kangaroos, Papalii would later feature in all 3 matches for Queensland in the 2017 State of Origin series where they won the series 2–1. Papalii finished the 2017 NRL season with him playing in 20 matches and scoring 5 tries for the Raiders.

On 6 October 2017, after missing selection for the Kangaroos for the 2017 Rugby League World Cup, Papalii was selected in the 24-man squad for Samoa to honour his grandfather who died while he was in camp with the Prime Minister's XIII squad, which he pulled out of the match to spend time with family.

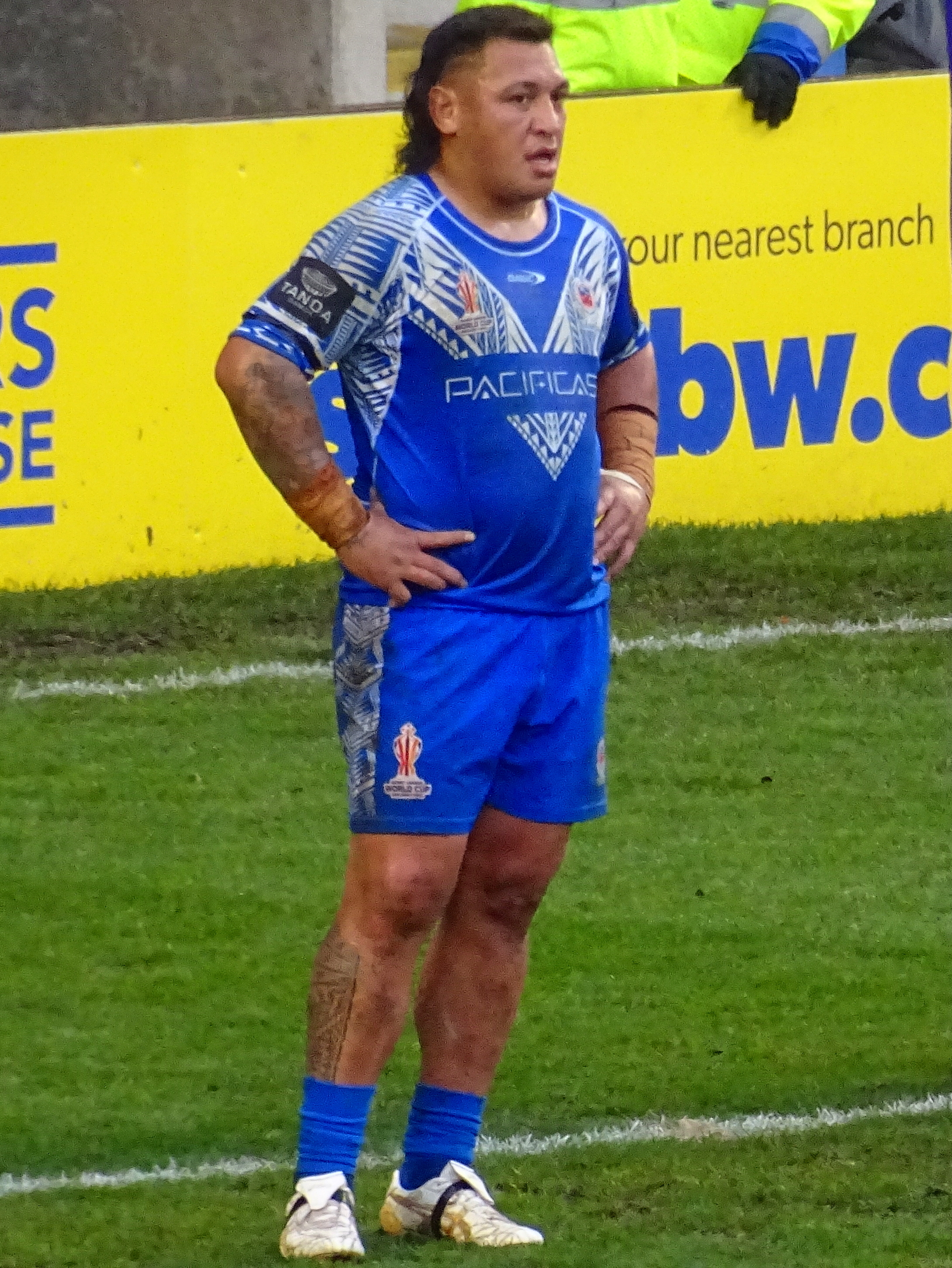
Papali'i playing for Samoa in 2022

Papalii would play and start at second-row in all 4 matches for Samoa in their disappointing campaign.

=== 2018 ===
In Round 1 against the Gold Coast Titans, Papalii played his 150th NRL career match in the 30–28 loss at Robina Stadium. On 3 April 2018, Papalii was dropped to reserve grade by coach Ricky Stuart along with fellow Canberra player Blake Austin after a tough opening month to the competition where Canberra lost their opening 4 games. In April 2018 he was caught bagging out his coach Ricky Stuart as the "worst coach ever". On 31 May 2018, Papalii spoke to the media about his shock axing to reserve grade saying "Our team wasn't going too well at the time and I knew someone had to go back. Sticky thought it should be me. I copped it on the chin, found some form and I'm happy that I've come back and played some decent footy. On 15 June 2018, Papalii extended his contract with the Raiders on a 4-year deal until the end of 2022. Papalii was again selected for the Queensland Maroons for the 2018 State of Origin series, playing in all 3 matches in the Maroons 2–1 series loss. Papalii finished the 2018 NRL season with him playing in 22 matches and scoring 5 tries for the Raiders. On 11 September 2018, Papalii was received the Mal Meninga Medal for being the Raiders Best Player of the Year.

=== 2019 ===
Papalii was selected to play for Queensland in the 2019 State of Origin series which New South Wales won 2–1. Papalii featured in all 3 matches. In Round 22 of the 2019 NRL season against Melbourne, Papalii scored the winning try as Canberra came from 18–0 down to win 22–18 at AAMI Park. It was also the first time since 2015 that Melbourne had lost 2 games in a row at their home stadium.

In the preliminary final against South Sydney, Papalii scored the winning try as Canberra reached their first grand final in 25 years after defeating Souths 16–10 at Canberra Stadium.

Papalii played at prop for Canberra in the 2019 NRL Grand Final as they were defeated 14–8 by the Sydney Roosters at ANZ Stadium.

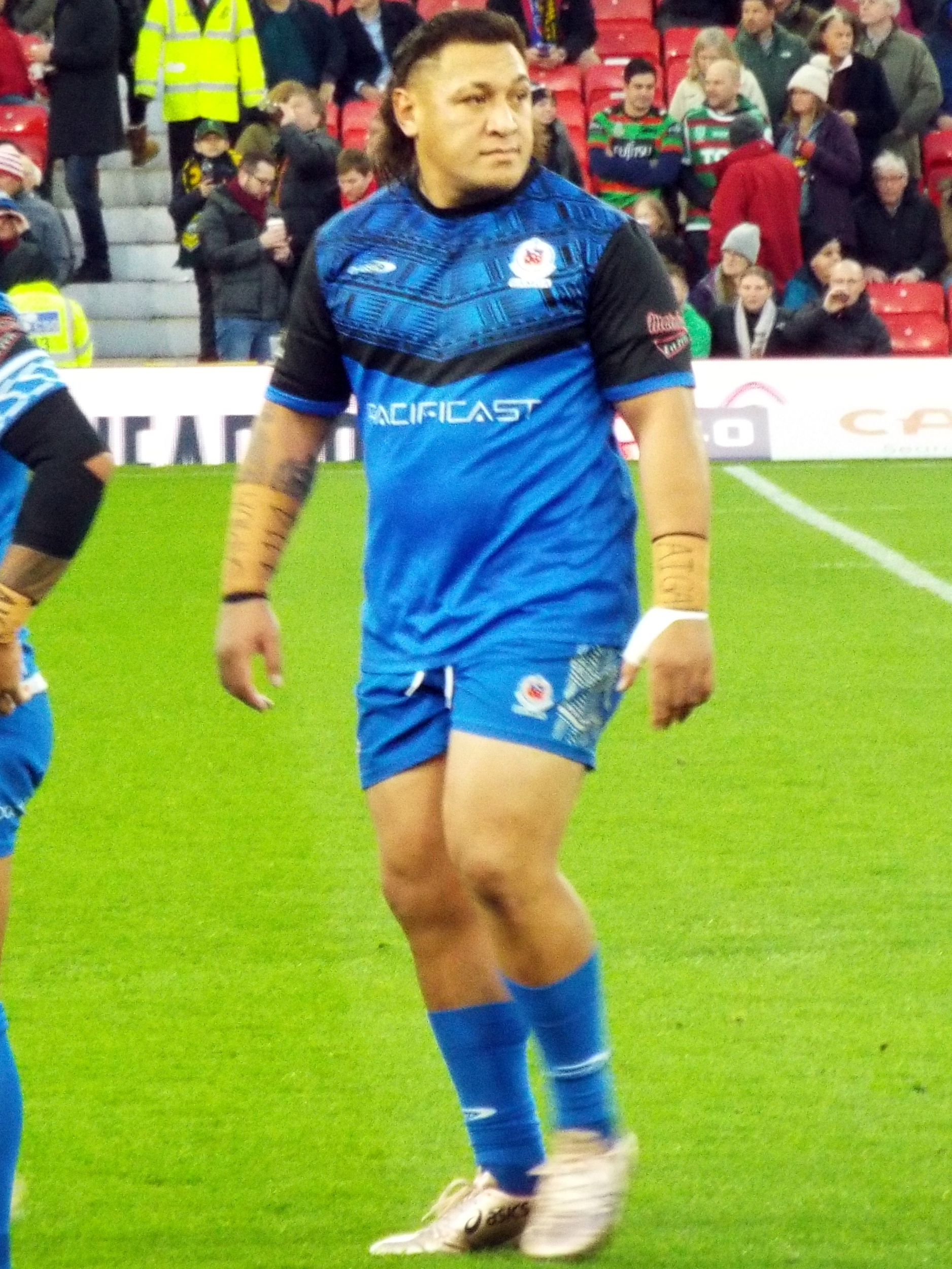
Papali'i warming up for Samoa in 2022

On 7 October, Papalii was named in the Australian side for the upcoming Oceania Cup fixtures.

=== 2020 ===
Papalii had another outstanding season in 2020 for Canberra and was rewarded with his fourth Meninga Medal, this time sharing the award with Jack Wighton as they finished atop the voting for the club's player of the year. He played a total of 22 games and featured in all three of the club's finals matches as the club reached the preliminary final but were defeated by Melbourne.

=== 2021 ===
In round 10 of the 2021 NRL season, he was sent off for an illegal shoulder charge during Canberra's 20–18 victory over Canterbury-Bankstown. He made a total of 20 appearances in the 2021 NRL season for Canberra which saw the club finish in 10th place on the table.

=== 2022 ===
Papali'i played a total of 25 matches for Canberra in the 2022 NRL season as the club finished 8th on the table and qualified for the finals. Papali'i played in both finals matches as Canberra were eliminated in the second week by Parramatta.

In October Papali'i was named in the Samoa squad for the 2021 Rugby League World Cup.

=== 2023 ===
Papali'i played a total of 18 matches for Canberra in the 2023 NRL season as the club finished 8th on the table and qualified for the finals.

=== 2024 ===
In round 22 of the 2024 NRL season, Papali'i played in his 300th NRL match in Canberra's narrow loss to Canterbury at Belmore Sports Ground.

In the early hours of 16 September 2024, Papali'i and a friend were allegedly behaving aggressively, smashing glasses, and refusing to leave Canberra Raiders Leagues Club. Police and the NRL Integrity Unit investigated the incident. He played 23 matches for Canberra in the 2024 NRL season as the club finished 9th on the table.

=== 2025 ===
Papali'i during Canberra's round 13 match had equalled with former club player Jason Croker with most matches played for the Raiders, with Papali'i equalling 318 club matches. During Canberra's round 14 win against the South Sydney Rabbitohs, Papali'i became the clubs most capped player, scoring two tries and kicking a goal. Papali'i had told Canberra's management that he would not play against the club and he would seek to continue his playing career overseas in the Super League if it was possible. Papalii also mentioned he would be happy to take a role at the Canberra outfit behind the scenes with less game time, to potentially retire at the club with a future role Papali'i was named for the State of Origin game three decider, two years after he retired from representative football.

On 12 September, the capital club announced that Papali'i had re-signed with them for a further year. On 15 September, Papali'i was inducted as a life member of the Canberra club. He played 24 matches for Canberra in the 2025 NRL season as the club claimed the Minor Premiership. Papali'i played in both finals matches as Canberra went out in straight sets losing to both Brisbane and Cronulla. On 7 October, Papali'i was named in the Samoa squad for the Pacific Championships.

On 31 October 2025, Papali'i's legal counsel were awarded a permanent stay on his charges after police used a group chat to discuss legal matters and the case was thrown out with Papali'i being awarded costs.

=== 2026 ===
On 17 August, Papali'i announced his official retirement from the NRL at the end of the 2026 season.

== Statistics ==
| Year | Team | Games | Tries | Goals | Pts |
|---|---|---|---|---|---|
| 2011 | Canberra Raiders | 14 | 3 | | 12 |
| 2012 | Canberra Raiders | 26 | 7 | | 28 |
| 2013 | Canberra Raiders | 21 | 3 | | 12 |
| 2014 | Canberra Raiders | 19 | 3 | | 12 |
| 2015 | Canberra Raiders | 24 | 8 | | 32 |
| 2016 | Canberra Raiders | 25 | 7 | | 28 |
| 2017 | Canberra Raiders | 20 | 5 | | 20 |
| 2018 | Canberra Raiders | 22 | 5 | | 20 |
| 2019 | Canberra Raiders | 26 | 6 | | 24 |
| 2020 | Canberra Raiders | 22 | 5 | | 20 |
| 2021 | Canberra Raiders | 20 | 4 | | 16 |
| 2022 | Canberra Raiders | 25 | 4 | | 16 |
| 2023 | Canberra Raiders | 18 | 2 | | 8 |
| 2024 | Canberra Raiders | 23 | 2 | | 8 |
| 2025 | Canberra Raiders | 24 | 3 | 1 | 14 |
| 2026 | Canberra Raiders | 13 | 1 | | 4 |
| | Totals | 342 | 68 | 1 | 274 |

== Personal life ==
Earlier in his career Papali'i contemplated becoming a priest and is now reportedly a "committed Christian". In 2013, Papalii was a youth leader at his Christian church in Canberra conducting weekly bible studies. In 2020, he refused the NRL's mandatory COVID vaccination, citing religious beliefs and personal choice.
