= 2019 State of Origin series =

Australian rugby league series

- Won by: New South Wales (15th title)
- Series margin: 2–1
- Points scored: 122
- Attendance: 194,477 (ave. 64,826 per match)
- Player of the series: James Tedesco
- Top points scorer(s): James Maloney (20)
- Top try scorer(s): Tom Trbojevic (3)

The 2019 State of Origin series was the 38th annual best-of-three series between the Queensland and New South Wales rugby league teams. Before this series, Queensland had won 21 times, NSW 14 times, with two series drawn.

For just the second time, a game was played away from Sydney, Brisbane or Melbourne, with Game 2 played at Perth’s Optus Stadium.

== Game I ==
Wednesday, 5 June 2019
8:10pm (AEST)

Queensland	18–14	New South Wales
Tries: Dane Gagai (67', 71') 2 Corey Oates (53') 1 Goals: Kalyn Ponga 3/4 (54', 59' pen, 72')	1st: 0 – 8; 2nd: 18 – 6	Tries: 1 (20') Josh Morris; 1 (76') Jake Trbojevic; Goals: 3/3 Nathan Cleary (13' pen, 21', 76'); Sin Bin: (58') Latrell Mitchell

Suncorp Stadium, Brisbane
Attendance: 52,191
Referee: Gerard Sutton, Ashley Klein
Player of the Match: Dane Gagai

== Game II ==
Sunday, 23 June 2019
5:50pm (AWST)

Queensland	6–38	New South Wales
Tries: Will Chambers (14' pen) 1 Goals: Kalyn Ponga 1/1 (15')	1st: 6 – 18; 2nd: 0 – 20	Tries: 3 (8', 36', 54') Tom Trbojevic; 2 (58', 74') Josh Addo-Carr; 1 (19') Tyson Frizell; Goals: 5/6 James Maloney (37', 45' pen, 50' pen, 56', 76'); 2/2 Nathan Cleary (9', 20')

Optus Stadium, Perth
Attendance: 59,721
Referee: Gerard Sutton, Ashley Klein
Player of the Match: Jake Trbojevic

== Game III ==
Wednesday, 10 July 2019
8:10pm (AEST)

New South Wales	26–20	Queensland
Tries: James Tedesco (52', 80') 2 Paul Vaughan (35') 1 Damien Cook (60') 1 Goals: James Maloney 5/5 (6' pen, 36', 53', 61', 80')	1st: 8 – 8; 2nd: 18 – 12	Tries: 1 (15') Felise Kaufusi; 1 (72') Josh McGuire; 1 (77') Josh Papalii; Goals: 4/4 Ethan Lowe (17', 29' pen, 72', 78')

ANZ Stadium, Sydney
Attendance: 82,565
Referee: Gerard Sutton, Ashley Klein
Player of the Match: James Tedesco

== Teams ==
=== New South Wales Blues ===
Position	Game 1	Game 2	Game 3
Fullback	James Tedesco		
Wing	Nick Cotric	Blake Ferguson	
Centre	Latrell Mitchell	Tom Trbojevic	
Centre	Josh Morris	Jack Wighton	
Wing	Josh Addo-Carr		
Five-eighth	Cody Walker	James Maloney	
Halfback	Nathan Cleary		Mitchell Pearce
Prop	David Klemmer	Daniel Saifiti	
Hooker	Damien Cook		
Prop	Paul Vaughan	Jake Trbojevic	David Klemmer
Second row	Boyd Cordner (c)		
Second row	Tyson Frizell		
Lock	Jake Trbojevic	Dale Finucane	Jake Trbojevic
Interchange	Jack Wighton	Paul Vaughan	
Interchange	Payne Haas	Tariq Sims	Dale Finucane
Interchange	Cameron Murray		
Interchange	Angus Crichton	Wade Graham	
Coach	Brad Fittler		

1 - Playing in his eighth State of Origin series, Mitchell Pearce finally got his first ever series win after being called into the side in the decider for the injured Nathan Cleary.

=== Queensland Maroons ===
Position	Game 1	Game 2	Game 3
Fullback	Kalyn Ponga		Cameron Munster
Wing	Corey Oates		
Centre	Michael Morgan		Will Chambers
Centre	Will Chambers		Moses Mbye
Wing	Dane Gagai		
Five-eighth	Cameron Munster		Corey Norman
Halfback	Daly Cherry-Evans (c)		
Prop	Jai Arrow	Dylan Napa	Joe Ofahengaue
Hooker	Ben Hunt		
Prop	Josh Papalii		
Second row	Felise Kaufusi		
Second row	Matt Gillett		Ethan Lowe
Lock	Josh McGuire		
Interchange	Moses Mbye		Michael Morgan
Interchange	Joe Ofahengaue	Jarrod Wallace	Christian Welch
Interchange	Dylan Napa	Tim Glasby	
Interchange	David Fifita		
Coach	Kevin Walters		

1 - 2019 would be Kevin Walters' final series as coach of the Queensland Maroons, resigning from the position in 2020 to take up an NRL coaching role with the Brisbane Broncos.

== Player Debuts ==
=== Game 1 ===
- Cap no. 281, Nick Cotric
- Cap no. 282, Cody Walker
- Cap no. 283, Payne Haas
- Cap no. 284, Cameron Murray
- Cap no. 285, Jack Wighton
- Cap no. 198, Moses Mbye
- Cap no. 199, Joe Ofahengaue
- Cap no. 200, David Fifita

=== Game 2 ===
- Cap no. 286, Daniel Saifiti
- Cap no. 287, Dale Finucane

=== Game 3 ===
- Cap no. 201, Corey Norman
- Cap no. 202, Christian Welch
- Cap no. 203, Ethan Lowe

== Residents ==
Sunday, 12 May 2019
13:10 AEST (UTC+10)

Queensland Residents	42–22	New South Wales Residents
Tries; Delouise Hoeter (7', 18', 58') 3 Sam Scarlett (21') 1 Temone Power (30') 1 Josh Cleeland (53') 1 Corey Jensen (77') 1 Goals; Josh Cleeland (7/8); Sin Bins	Report	Tries; Beau Fermor (40') 1 Brian To'o (43') 1 Dean Britt (49') 1 Keaon Koloamatangi (74') 1 Goals; Brock Lamb (2/3); Morgan Harper (1/1); Sin Bins; Morgan Harper (66'); Brock Lamb (76')

Dolphin Stadium, Queensland
Player of the Match: Sam Scarlett (Queensland Residents)

Team lists:

FB	1	Zac Santo
WG	2	Richard Kennar
CE	3	Delouise Hoeter
CE	4	Connor Broadhurst
WG	5	Izaia Perese
FE	6	Josh Cleeland (c)
HB	7	Sam Scarlett
PR	8	Nat Neale
HK	9	Mitch Cronin
PR	10	Corey Jensen
SR	11	Keenan Palasia
SR	12	Temone Power
LK	13	Tom Gilbert
Substitutes:
IC	14	Christian Hazard
IC	15	Tino Fa'asuamaleaui
IC	16	Brett Greinke
IC	17	Darryn Schonig
Coach:
Jon Buchanan

FB	1	Kieren Moss
WG	2	Christian Crichton
CE	3	Reubenn Rennie
CE	4	Morgan Harper
WG	5	Brian To'o
FE	6	Connor Tracey
HB	7	Brock Lamb
PR	8	JJ Collins
HK	9	Billy Brittain (c)
PR	10	Lloyd Perrett
SR	11	Dean Britt
SR	12	Beau Fermor
LK	13	Josh Curran
Substitutes:
IC	14	Keaon Koloamatangi
IC	15	Mitch Kenny
IC	16	Renouf To'omaga
IC	17	Tom Amone
Coach:
Shane Millard

== Under 20s ==
Wednesday, 10 July 2019
8:10pm (AEST)

New South Wales	36–10	Queensland
Tries: Matt Burton (8', 22') 2 Teig Wilton (31') 1 Matt Croker (48') 1 Ky Rodwell (52') 1 Ethan Parry (62') 1 Goals: Stephen Crichton 6/7 (23', 33', 40' pen, 49', 54', 64')	1st: 16 – 4; 2nd: 20 – 6	Tries: 1 (12') Ronaldo Mulitalo; 1 (67') Murray Taulagi; Goals: 1/3 Braydon Trindall (68')

ANZ Stadium, Sydney
Referee: Martin Jones
Player of the Match: Matt Burton

Team lists:

FB	1	Tex Hoy
WG	2	Tui Katoa
CE	3	Stephen Crichton
CE	4	Ethan Parry
WG	5	Jason Saab
FE	6	Matt Burton
HB	7	Blake Taaffe
PR	8	Spencer Leniu
HK	9	Sam Verrills
PR	10	Ky Rodwell
SR	11	Teig Wilton
SR	12	Matt Doorey
LK	13	Darby Medlyn
Substitutes:
IC	14	Luke Huth
IC	15	Stefano Utoikamanu
IC	16	Matt Croker
IC	17	Alex Seyfarth
Coach:
Mark O’Meley

FB	1	Ronaldo Mulitalo
WG	2	Treymain Spry
CE	3	Tesi Niu
CE	4	Murray Taulagi
WG	5	Elijah Anderson
FE	6	Braydon Trindall
HB	7	Cory Paix (c)
PR	8	Eddie Blacker
HK	9	Kobe Hetherington
PR	10	Ethan Bullemor
SR	11	Tino Fa'asuamaleaui
SR	12	J'maine Hopgood
LK	13	Tom Gilbert
Substitutes:
IC	14	Tanah Boyd
IC	15	Ben Condon
IC	16	Logan Bayliss-Brow
IC	17	Nathan Barrett
Coach:
Scott Prince

== Under 18s ==
The Under-18s State of Origin match was played as a curtain raiser to Game I of State of Origin 2019.

Wednesday, 5 June 2019
17:15 AEST (UTC+10)

Queensland Under-18s
Tries:
Fanitesi Niu (26', 60') 2
Jake Simpkin (5') 1
Alofiana Khan-Pereira (17') 1
Xavier Coates (53') 1
Reece Walsh (67') 1
Goals:
Joshua James 5/6
(7', 19', 28', 62', 69')
34–12
1st: 18 – 6
2nd: 16 – 6

Report

New South Wales Under-18s
Tries:
1 (10') David Hollis
1 (40') Sione Fainu
Goals:
2/2 Jayden Sullivan
(11', 41')

Suncorp Stadium, Brisbane
Player of the Match: Xavier Coates

Team lists:

FB	1	Hamiso Tabuai-Fidow
WG	2	Alofiana Khan-Pereira
CE	3	Reece Hoffman
CE	4	Tesi Niu
WG	5	Xavier Coates
FE	6	Joshua James (c)
HB	7	Sam Walker
PR	8	Jack Martin
HK	9	Jake Simpkin
PR	10	Tristan Powell
SR	11	Brendan Piakura
SR	12	Trent Loiero
LK	13	Juwan Compain
Substitutes:
IC	14	Reece Walsh
IC	15	Jack Howarth
IC	16	Carsil Vaikai
IC	17	Harrison Graham
Coach:
Kurt Richards

FB	1	Bradman Best
WG	2	Matthew Feagai
CE	3	Max Feagai
CE	4	Viliami Penisini
WG	5	Tyrell Sloan
FE	6	Jayden Sullivan
HB	7	Noah Griffiths
PR	8	David Hollis
HK	9	Mitchell Black
PR	10	Sione Fainu
SR	11	Jackson Topine (c)
SR	12	Josh Schuster
LK	13	Siua Fotu
Substitutes:
IC	14	Kaeo Weekes
IC	15	Ben Trbojevic
IC	16	Alec Tuitavake
IC	17	Trey Mooney
Coach:
Michael Ennis

== Universities Interstate Challenge ==
Saturday 11 May 2019
12:00 AEST (UTC+10)

Queensland Universities	28–10	New South Wales Universities
Tries; Jake Sparey 2 Sam Collins 2 Josh Rogers 1 Jack Miers 1 Goals; Brayden Torpy (2/6)	Report	Tries; 1 Trent Peoples; 1 Royce Tout; Goals (1/2) Dylan Izzard

Langlands Park, Brisbane
Player of the Match: Dalton Phillips (Queensland Universities)

Team lists:

FB	1	Brayden Torpy
WG	2	Jordon Perrins-Phillips
CE	3	Declan Morrissy
CE	4	Sam Collins
WG	5	Jake Sparey
FE	6	Joshua Rogers
HB	7	Josh James
PR	15	Cody McIntosh
HK	9	Jack Miers
PR	10	Jack Brock
SR	11	Ryan Cameron
SR	16	Tom Rafter
LK	13	Dalton Phillips (c)
Substitutes:
IC	8	Dylan Haiijer
IC	12	Brock Richardson
IC	16	Harrison Graham
IC	17	Matthew Butler
IC	18	Hector Hilberto
Coach:
Mark Gliddon

FB	1	Dylan Izzard
WG	2	Samaka Isaacs
CE	3	Nick O’Meley
CE	4	Jack Gibbons
WG	5	Brayden Stewart-Thomas
FE	6	Tom Watkins
HB	7	Luke Jurd
PR	8	Matthew Jurd (c)
HK	9	Maverick Tweedie
PR	10	Matt Sheppard
SR	11	Trent Peoples
SR	12	Reed Izzard
LK	13	Royce Tout
Substitutes:
IC	14	Alec Bush
IC	15	Harrison Leonard
IC	16	Jack Cross
IC	17	Alex Fisher
IC	18	Cheyne Pike
Coach:
Drew Dalton

== Women's State of Origin ==
On 21 June, the 2019 Women's State of Origin game was played at the North Sydney Oval. New South Wales retained the title with a 14–4 win. New South Wales also won the women's under-18s match that was played as a curtain-raiser to the senior game.

== Wheelchair State of Origin ==
In 2019, the annual wheelchair rugby league competition was rebranded as the Wheelchair State of Origin. The game was played on 6 July at the Quaycentre, Sydney, and was won 52–4 by New South Wales.
