= 2018 State of Origin series =

Australian rugby league series

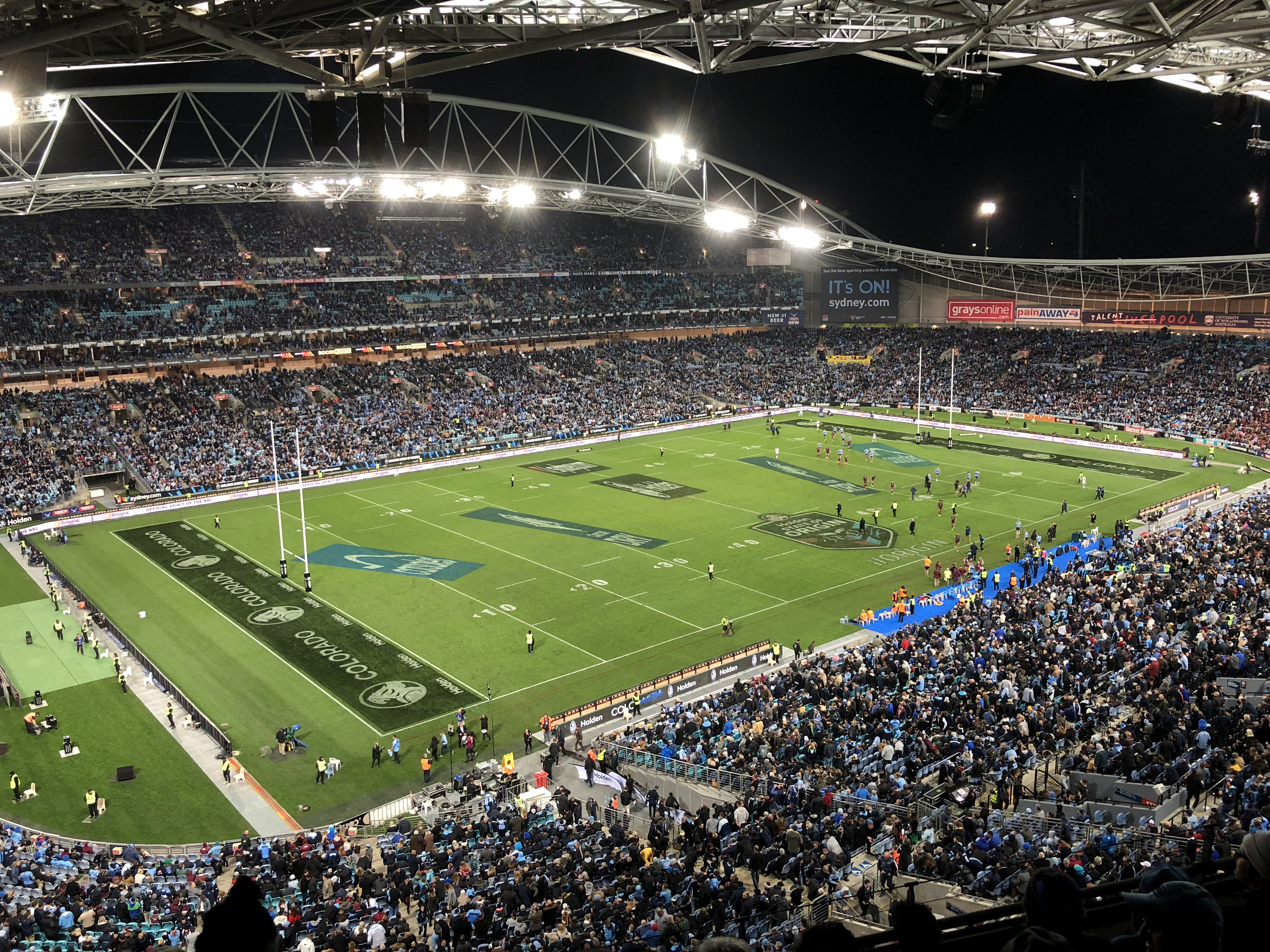
- The view of ANZ Stadium during Game II.
- Won by: New South Wales (14th title)
- Series margin: 2–1
- Points scored: 96
- Attendance: 220,559 (ave. 73,520 per match)
- Player of the series: Billy Slater
- Top points scorer(s): Valentine Holmes (28)
- Top try scorer(s): Valentine Holmes (4)

The 2018 State of Origin series was the 37th annual best-of-three series between the Queensland and New South Wales rugby league teams. Before this series, Queensland had won 21 times, NSW 13 times, with two series drawn. The 2018 series was won by New South Wales, after winning the first 2 games of the series, their first since 2014, and their second since 2005.

Kevin Walters coached Queensland for the third year in a row, while New South Wales were coached by Brad Fittler after he replaced Laurie Daley in November 2017.

== Game I ==
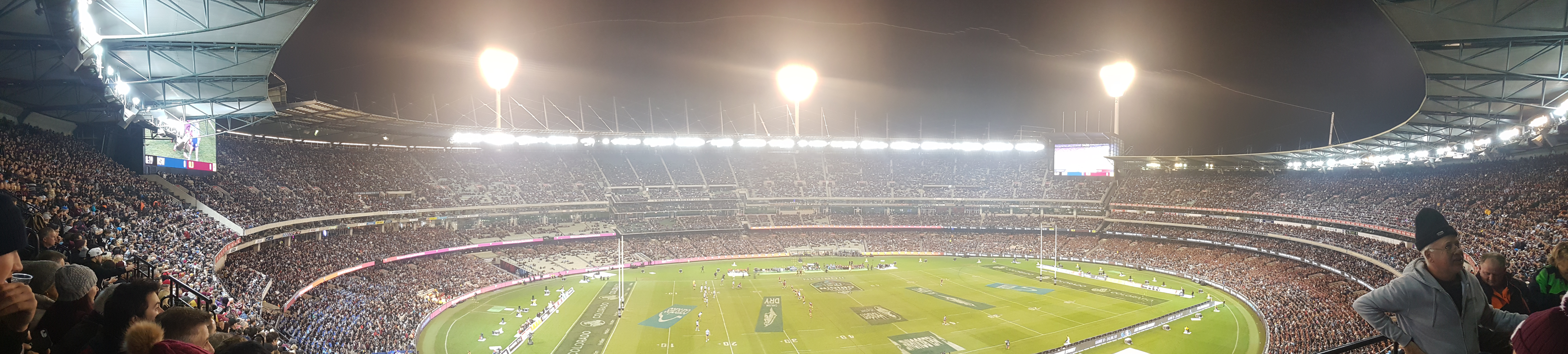
Melbourne Cricket Ground during game one.

Wednesday, 6 June 2018
8:00pm (AEST)

New South Wales	22–12	Queensland
Tries: James Tedesco (22') 1 Latrell Mitchell (48') 1 Tom Trbojevic (51') 1 Josh Addo-Carr (70') 1 Goals: James Maloney 3/5 (18' pen, 23', 51')	1st: 8 – 6; 2nd: 14 – 6	Tries: 1 (28') Valentine Holmes; 1 (43') Dane Gagai; Goals: 2/2 Valentine Holmes (30', 45')

Melbourne Cricket Ground, Melbourne
Attendance: 87,122
Referee: Gerard Sutton, Ashley Klein
Player of the Match: James Tedesco

== Game II ==
Sunday, 24 June 2018
7:40pm (AEST)

New South Wales	18–14	Queensland
Tries: Josh Addo-Carr (25') 1 Boyd Cordner (31' pen) 1 Latrell Mitchell (50') 1 Goals: James Maloney 3/3 (27', 33', 52'); Sin Bin: James Roberts (69')	1st: 12 – 10; 2nd: 6 – 4	Tries: 1 (13') Valentine Holmes; 1 (20') Dane Gagai; 1 (63') Will Chambers; Goals: 1/3 Valentine Holmes (21')

ANZ Stadium, Sydney
Attendance: 82,223
Referee: Gerard Sutton, Ashley Klein
Player of the Match: Boyd Cordner

== Game III ==
Wednesday, 11 July 2018
8:00pm (AEST)

Queensland	18–12	New South Wales
Tries: Valentine Holmes (11', 51') 2 Daly Cherry-Evans (57') 1 Goals: Valentine Holmes 3/4 (11', 30' pen, 58')	1st: 8 – 12; 2nd: 10 – 0	Tries: 1 (36') Tom Trbojevic; 1 (39') James Tedesco; Goals: 2/2 Nathan Cleary (38', 40'); Sin Bin: James Maloney (30')

Suncorp Stadium, Brisbane
Attendance: 51,214
Referee: Gerard Sutton, Ashley Klein
Player of the Match: Billy Slater

== Teams ==
=== New South Wales Blues ===
Position	Game 1	Game 2	Game 3
Fullback	James Tedesco		
Wing	Tom Trbojevic		
Centre	Latrell Mitchell		
Centre	James Roberts		
Wing	Josh Addo-Carr		
Five-eighth	James Maloney		
Halfback	Nathan Cleary		
Prop	David Klemmer		
Hooker	Damien Cook		
Prop	Reagan Campbell-Gillard	Matt Prior	Paul Vaughan
Second row	Boyd Cordner (c)		
Second row	Tyson Frizell		
Lock	Jack de Belin		Jake Trbojevic
Interchange	Paul Vaughan		Jack de Belin
Interchange	Jake Trbojevic		Tariq Sims
Interchange	Angus Crichton		
Interchange	Tyrone Peachey		
Coach	Brad Fittler		

1 - New South Wales named a record 11 debutants for Game 1

=== Queensland Maroons ===
Position	Game 1	Game 2	Game 3
Fullback	Michael Morgan	Billy Slater	Billy Slater (c)
Wing	Valentine Holmes		
Centre	Greg Inglis (c)		Dane Gagai
Centre	Will Chambers		
Wing	Dane Gagai		Corey Oates
Five-eighth	Cameron Munster		
Halfback	Ben Hunt		Daly Cherry-Evans
Prop	Dylan Napa		Jai Arrow
Hooker	Andrew McCullough		
Prop	Jarrod Wallace		Josh Papalii
Second row	Gavin Cooper		
Second row	Felise Kaufusi		
Lock	Josh McGuire		
Interchange	Josh Papalii	Kalyn Ponga	Ben Hunt
Interchange	Coen Hess	Josh Papalii	Jarrod Wallace
Interchange	Jai Arrow	Coen Hess	
Interchange	Anthony Milford	Jai Arrow	Tim Glasby
Coach	Kevin Walters		

1 - In Game I, Billy Slater was originally selected at fullback for Queensland but had to withdraw due to an injury. He was replaced at fullback by Michael Morgan, with Anthony Milford coming on to the bench as a replacement.

2 - Greg Inglis took over the captaincy for the Maroons after the retirement from rep football of Cameron Smith. A thumb injury after Game 2 meant Billy Slater would take over the role for Game 3.

3 - Daly Cherry-Evans made his return to State of Origin, named for his first start at halfback since Game 2 of the 2015 series.

4 - Billy Slater would controversially be awarded with the Wally Lewis Medal for Player of the Series, despite only appearing in two out of the three games in a team that lost the series. The NRL changed the process for deciding the award the following year.

== Player Debuts ==
=== Game 1 ===
- Cap no. 268, Josh Addo-Carr
- Cap no. 269, Reagan Campbell-Gillard
- Cap no. 270, Nathan Cleary
- Cap no. 271, Damien Cook
- Cap no. 272, Jack de Belin
- Cap no. 273, Latrell Mitchell
- Cap no. 274, James Roberts
- Cap no. 275, Tom Trbojevic
- Cap no. 276, Angus Crichton
- Cap no. 277, Tyrone Peachey
- Cap no. 278, Paul Vaughan
- Cap no. 194, Andrew McCullough
- Cap no. 195, Felise Kaufusi
- Cap no. 196, Jai Arrow

=== Game 2 ===
- Cap no. 279, Matt Prior
- Cap no. 197, Kalyn Ponga

=== Game 3 ===
- Cap no. 280, Tariq Sims

== Under 18s ==
6 June 2018
5:15pm (AEST)

New South Wales U18s	16–10	Queensland U18s
Tries: Bronson Xerri (45') 1 Jason Saab (55') 1 Stefano Utoikamanu (75') 1 Goals: Jock Madden 2/3 (47', 76')	1st: 0 – 6; 2nd: 16 – 4	Tries: 1 (13') Tino Fa'asuamaleaui; 1 (60') David Fifita; Goals: 1/2 Tanah Boyd (15')

Melbourne Cricket Ground, Melbourne
Referee: Keiren Irons

Team lists:

FB	1	John-Paul Nohra
WG	2	Jason Saab
CE	3	Bradman Best
CE	4	Bronson Xerri
WG	5	Tallis Angianga
FE	6	Jock Madden
HB	7	Phoenix Crossland (c)
PR	8	Spencer Leniu
HK	9	Maurice Trindall
PR	10	Stefano Utoikamanu
SR	11	Egan Butcher
SR	12	Shawn Blore (c)
LK	13	Duwayne Fuimaono
Substitutes:
IC	14	Tommy Talau
IC	15	Matt Doorey
IC	16	Jalal Bazzaz
IC	18	Jason Purcell
Coach:
Mark O'Meley

FB	1	McKenzie Baker
WG	2	Sebastian Winters-Chang
CE	3	Jack Paterson
CE	4	Ioane Seiuli
WG	5	Xavier Coates
FE	6	Tanah Boyd
HB	7	Tom Dearden
PR	15	Geordie Brand
HK	9	Cory Paix
PR	10	Ethan Bullemor
SR	11	Tino Fa'asuamaleaui
SR	12	David Fifita (c)
LK	13	Tom Gilbert
Substitutes:
IC	8	Garrett Smith
IC	14	Fanitesi Niu
IC	16	David Butler
IC	17	Blake Campbell
Coach:
Kurt Richards

== Under 20s ==
11 July 2018
5:15pm (AEST)

Queensland U20s	30–12	New South Wales U20s
Tries: Jake Clifford (6', 37') 2 Corey Horsburgh (24') 1 Kurt Wilshire (43') 1 Tristan Sailor (50') 1 Goals: Jake Clifford 5/5 (7', 25', 39', 45', 51')	1st: 18 – 6; 2nd: 12 – 6	Tries: 1 (14') Brian To'o; 1 (68') Billy Smith; Goals: 2/3 Kyle Flanagan (18' pen, 69')

Suncorp Stadium, Brisbane
Referee: Benjamin Watts
Player of the Match: Jake Clifford

Team lists:

FB	1	Corey Allan
WG	2	Murray Taulagi
CE	3	Gehamat Shibasaki
CE	4	Kurt Wiltshire
WG	5	Tristan Sailor
FE	6	AJ Brimson
HB	7	Jake Clifford
PR	8	Thomas Flegler
HK	9	Harry Grant
PR	10	Patrick Carrigan (c)
SR	11	Louis Geraghty
SR	12	Beau Fermor
LK	13	Corey Horsburgh
Substitutes:
IC	14	Lachlan Lam
IC	15	Tino Fa'asuamaleaui
IC	16	Sam Johnstone
IC	17	Reed Mahoney
Coach:
Justin Hodges

FB	1	Ryan Papenhuyzen
WG	2	Billy Smith
CE	3	Matheson Johns
CE	4	Bronson Xerri
WG	5	Brian Too
FE	6	Brendan O'Hagan
HB	7	Kyle Flanagan (c)
PR	8	Oregon Kaufusi
HK	9	Reece Robson
PR	10	Emre Guler
SR	11	Billy Burns
SR	17	Teig Wilton
LK	13	Josh Curran
Substitutes:
IC	14	Blayke Brailey
IC	15	Ky Rodwell
IC	16	Setefano Hala
IC	18	Josh Carr
Coach:
Matt King

== Residents ==
24 June 2018
4:10pm (AEST)

New South Wales Residents	36–20	Queensland Residents
Tries: Dean Britt (18', 21') 2 Kyle Flanagan (5') 1 Luke Garner (26') 1 Sean O'Sullivan (35') 1 Tony Satini (52') 1 Goals: Kyle Flanagan 6/6 (7', 19', 23', 28', 37', 54')	1st: 30 – 0; 2nd: 6 – 20	Tries: 2 (43', 78') Kalifa Faifai Loa; 1 (73') Blake Leary; 1 (75') Scott Drinkwater; Goals: 2/3 Kalifa Faifai Loa (74', 76'); 0/1 Jonus Pearson

ANZ Stadium, Sydney
Referee: Todd Smith, Liam Kennedy

Team lists:

FB	1	Caleb Aekins
WG	2	Tony Satini
CE	3	Aaron Gray
CE	4	Mawene Hiroti
WG	5	Maika Sivo
FE	6	Sean O'Sullivan
HB	7	Kyle Flanagan (c)
PR	8	Kurt Dillon
HK	9	Blayke Brailey
PR	10	JJ Felise
SR	16	Dean Britt
SR	12	Luke Garner
LK	13	Liam Martin
Substitutes:
IC	14	Suaia Matagi
IC	15	Ofahiki Ogden
IC	17	Billy Brittain
IC	19	Bayley Sironen
Coach:
Shane Millard

FB	1	Scott Drinkwater
WG	2	Jonus Pearson
CE	3	Marion Seve
CE	4	Gehamat Shibasaki
WG	5	Kalifa Faifai Loa
FE	6	Billy Walters
HB	7	Jamal Fogarty
PR	8	Nathaniel Neale
HK	9	Pat Politoni
PR	10	Sam Anderson
SR	11	Patrick Kaufusi
SR	12	Blake Leary (c)
LK	13	Patrick Mago
Substitutes:
IC	14	Mitch Cronin
IC	15	Patrick Carrigan
IC	16	Lachlan Timm
IC	17	Will Bugden
Coach:
Jon Flanagan

- Scott Sorensen was originally selected at second row and captain for New South Wales but withdrew. He was replaced at second row by Dean Britt, with Bayley Sironen coming on to the bench as a replacement, and was replaced as captain by Kyle Flanagan.

== Women's State of Origin ==
The women's competition, which had in previous years been known as the Interstate Challenge, became known as the Women's State of Origin for the first time in 2018. The game was played on 22 June and was won 16–10 by New South Wales.
