= Pittwater High School =

Location
- Mona Vale, New South Wales; Australia; 33°40′5.89″S 151°18′8.75″E

Information
- Type: Public, secondary, co-educational, day school
- Motto: Truth, Courtesy, Courage.
- Established: January 1963; 63 years ago
- Principal: Alison Gambino
- Years offered: 7–12
- Enrolment: 932 (2011)
- Colours: Maroon and blue
- Website: Pittwater High School

Pittwater High School, (abbreviation PHS) is a school located in Mona Vale, New South Wales, Australia, on Mona Street and Pittwater Road. It is a co-educational high school operated by the New South Wales Department of Education with students from years 7 to 12. The school was established in 1963.

== History and name ==
Pittwater High School was established in 1963. It is named after Pittwater, the body of water extending south from Broken Bay parallel to the coast. The waterway was surveyed by crew members of HMS Sirius in 1788, and named "Pitt Water" after British Prime Minister William Pitt the Younger.

Due to its location the school has a rich sporting history, producing many Olympians, especially in both swimming and sailing, and had its own yacht, "Kalori", which was built and sailed by students and staff, it was operational between 1970-1980.

The school also has a strong musical tradition, with internationally renowned jazz musician James Morrison and his brother John Morrison both students at the school in the 1970s, along with the children of Australian rock singer Johnny O'Keefe and Keith Potger of the Seekers. The school has been involved in the Rock Eisteddfod Challenge since its inception in the early 1980s, winning the 1987 Sydney challenge, despite a disastrous school fire the night before the final.

In August 1986, the school's Binishell Dome collapsed after a PDHPE lesson due to errors in the curing process. This caused a decline in popularity of Binishells across NSW public schools.

PHS joined the Peninsula Community of Schools in 2008. The uniform is also used on the Seven Network TV show Home & Away. PHS is the sister school of New Trier High School in Chicago, America.

== Notable Staff ==
Trent Schmutter - former professional outfielder of Sydney Blue Sox

== Notable alumni ==
- Kirk Baxter – film editor
- Colin Beashel – member of the crew of Australia II (1983 America's Cup winning yacht), and 8 times Olympian
- Tom Burlinson – actor and singer
- Tom Carroll – twice Professional World Surfing champion
- Rodney Clarke – senior Australian ice dance champion and Olympian
- Tess Haubrich – actress and model
- Andrew Lloyd – Olympic runner and Commonwealth Games gold medallist
- James Morrison – musician
- John Morrison – musician
- Georgina Parkes – Olympic swimmer and Commonwealth Games gold medallist
- Kerryn Phelps – former AMA President, professor
- Peter Phelps – actor
- Courtney Barnett – musician
- James Spithill – yachtsman and twice America's Cup winning skipper
- Rebecca Lacey – actress
- Tom Trbojevic – rugby league player for the Manly-Warringah Sea Eagles
- Jake Trbojevic – rugby league player for the Manly-Warringah Sea Eagles
- Ben Trbojevic – rugby league player for the Manly-Warringah Sea Eagles
- Shane Fitzsimmons – Commissioner of the New South Wales Rural Fire Service; 2021 NSW Australian of the Year.
- Michael Stead – Bishop of South Sydney, Anglican Church Diocese of Sydney
- Jason Waterhouse – sailor, Australian Sailing Team: Mixed Multihull – Nacra 17 – Rio Olympics 2016
- Louis Leimbach – Australian musician with Lime Cordiale and artist
- Oliver Leimbach – Australian musician with Lime Cordiale

== See also ==
- List of Government schools in New South Wales
- Electoral district of Pittwater
- Division of Mackellar
- Pittwater Council
