= Tom Trbojevic =

Australia international rugby league footballer

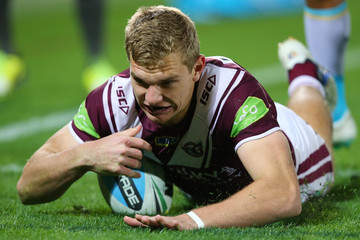

Personal information
- Full name: Thomas Peter Trbojevic
- Born: 2 October 1996 (age 30) Mona Vale, New South Wales, Australia
- Height: 194 cm (6 ft 4 in)
- Weight: 102 kg (16 st 1 lb)

Playing information
- Position: Fullback, Centre
Club
Years	Team	Pld	T	G	FG	P
2015–	Manly Sea Eagles	184	119	0	0	476
Representative
Years	Team	Pld	T	G	FG	P
2017–	Australia	12	15	0	0	60
2018–23	New South Wales	10	9	0	0	36
- Source: As of 22 November 2026
- Relatives: Ben Trbojevic (brother); Jake Trbojevic (brother)

Thomas Peter Trbojevic (born 2 October 1996), also nicknamed "Tommy Turbo", is an Australian professional rugby league footballer who plays as a fullback for the Manly Warringah Sea Eagles in the National Rugby League (NRL), where he also captains as of November 2025, and plays as a centre for Australia at an international level.

He played as a centre for the Australia team that won the 2024 Rugby League Pacific Championship. He has played for New South Wales at State of Origin level as a centre.

== Background ==
Trbojevic played his junior rugby league for the Mona Vale Juniors before being signed by the Manly Warringah Sea Eagles. As well as playing rugby union, Trbojevic played Australian rules from the age of 12 and was in the Sydney Swans AFL Academy between the ages of 14 and 17, crediting this experience with improving his aerial game.

Despite playing for Australia in junior representative rugby league teams, Trbojevic gained an ATAR of 94.3 in his HSC at Pittwater High School, achieving the top band for 2 and 3-unit mathematics. He studied a double degree in Applied Finance and Economics at Macquarie University.

Trbojevic is of Serbian descent. Tom is the brother of fellow Manly Warringah Sea Eagles players Jake Trbojevic and Ben Trbojevic. Another brother, Luke, is not involved with the NRL.

== Playing career ==
=== Early career ===
In 2014 and 2015, Trbojevic played for the Manly-Warringah in their NYC side, playing 32 games, scoring 41 tries. In June 2014, he played for the New South Wales Under-18s team. On 25 September 2014, he re-signed with Manly on a two-year contract.

=== 2015 ===
Trbojevic started 2015 playing fullback for Manly's NYC team and crossed for 4 tries in the opening game of the season against the Parramatta Eels at Pirtek Stadium. He continued to play a starring role in the Under 20's as Manly won its first four games of the season until injuries forced first grade coach Geoff Toovey to promote him to make his NRL debut on the wing for Manly-Warringah in their round 5 game against the Canberra Raiders at the Lavington Sports Ground in Albury in country NSW. Although Manly ultimately lost the game 29–16, Trbojevic scored a try with only his second touch of the ball and later crossed for his second try on debut. Unfortunately, a high ankle injury suffered in the following round against the Penrith Panthers sidelined him for a number of weeks.

On 28 April, along with older brother Jake and fellow local junior Clint Gutherson, Trbojevic extended his contract with Manly from the end of 2016 to the end of 2017.

Due to the quality of the Manly backline which included representative players Brett Stewart, Jamie Lyon, Steve Matai, Peta Hiku and Jorge Taufua, Trbojevic has been forced to bide his time playing in the NYC while being used as an injury replacement winger for the Manly's NRL side. On 25 July against the New Zealand Warriors at the Mt Smart Stadium in Auckland, New Zealand, while playing fullback in the NYC, Trbojevic had his second 4 try game of the season (giving him 14 in 7 NYC games in 2015), accumulating a NYC record 466 running metres for the game, prompting calls for him to be made a permanent first grade player. Two weeks before he had played his 7th first grade game, crossing for a double in Manly's 38–6 victory over the Gold Coast Titans, but was dropped for the next game against the North Queensland Cowboys in favour of returning New Zealand test centre Hiku. On 1 August following the Warriors game, he was again called into the NRL team as a replacement for Steve Matai who had been heavily concussed the week before against the Warriors. Trbojevic scored his third double of the season, including scooping up a loose ball and racing 70 metres to score the final try of the game, and played a starring role as Manly defeated the competition leading Brisbane Broncos 44–14 at the Central Coast Stadium in Gosford.

Despite only having played only 8 games in first grade in 2015, all of them on the wing, Trbojevic's talent as a fullback was recognised when he was named in the position for Rugby League Week's 2015 NRL Rookie Team of the Year. He was also named at fullback in the 2015 NYC Team of the Year.

Trbojevic's final game for Manly in 2015 was the Holden Cup Grand Final played on NRL Grand Final day. Although he had another strong game and scored his 29th try in 22 games for the year (21 tries from 13 games in the under-20s and 8 tries in 9 NRL games), the Sea Eagles went down to the minor premiers Penrith Panthers 34–18.

=== 2016 ===
On 1 February, Trbojevic was named in Manly's 2016 NRL Auckland Nines squad.

Trbojevic would play 23 games for the club in 2016, missing only round 9 due to a high ankle sprain suffered in the Anzac Day match against the Newcastle Knights. Although hampered by the injury which would require corrective surgery at the end of the season, he continued playing and was rewarded mid-season when he and brother Jake were called into the New South Wales squad before Game 3 of the 2016 State of Origin series as development players. He would go on to score 10 tries for the Sea Eagles after taking over from Brett Stewart at fullback (following season ending knee surgery to Stewart). On 7 September he was named as the Roy Bull Best and Fairest for the Sea Eagles 2016 season.

=== 2017 ===
With the injury enforced retirement of Brett Stewart, Trbojevic became Manly's first choice fullback for the 2017 NRL season. His form was such that he was predicted to be selected on the wing for New South Wales until suffering an injury in a game against the Brisbane Broncos on 13 May. Broncos halfback Kodi Nikorima put up a bomb which Trbojevic was forced to let bounce. With Brisbane winger David Mead flying through in his chase of the kick, Trbojevic was forced to leap to catch the ball and was tackled while in mid-air, coming down with his left leg buckling awkwardly underneath him. He was diagnosed with a Medial ligament tear in his knee and syndesmosis in his ankle and was expected to be out for 6–8 weeks. He finished the season with 22 games and 12 tries. At the end of the year, he was rewarded for this form with an Australian jersey, playing 2 games in the World Cup and scoring 1 try.

=== 2018 ===
In round 4, Trbojevic injured his ankle in the final 10 minutes of the match and missed the following week's game. On 6 June, he made the NSW team and won the series 2–1 with his brother Jake Trbojevic. Trbojevic played in all three of the New South Wales Blues games on the wing scoring two tries. At the end of the 2018 season, he played two test matches for Australia against New Zealand and Tonga playing in the centres where he scored two tries.

=== 2019 ===
Trbojevic began the 2019 NRL season by scoring 2 tries against the New Zealand Warriors in Round 3 of the competition. In round 4, Trbojevic was taken from the field during Manly's win over South Sydney with a hamstring injury. Trbojevic subsequently missed out on the opening game of the 2019 State of Origin series. Trbojevic returned to the Manly side in Round 13 against North Queensland. After only 2 games back in the Manly team, Trbojevic was selected to play for New South Wales in Game 2 of the State of Origin series. On 23 June, Trbojevic scored a hat-trick as New South Wales defeated Queensland 38–6 at the new Perth Stadium. Trbojevic was retained for Game 3 of the 2019 State of Origin series which was won by New South Wales 26–20 at ANZ Stadium. It was the first time since 2005 that New South Wales had won back to back series. Manly's 2019 season was a story of success with Des Hasler resurgence, guiding the Manly team from 15th to 6th. While Trbojevic enjoyed success during the year with winning 10/12 of the games he played in, but the year was mostly defined but the two hamstring injures and the torn pectoral muscle he sustained during the regular season which stop him playing in Manly's finals series.

=== 2020 ===
Trbojevic started the 2020 NRL season off very well, recording solid performances against both the Melbourne Storm and Sydney Roosters. When the season resumed in round 3, his form continued against the Canterbury-Bankstown Bulldogs scoring two tries and producing three try assists. By round 6, he was leading the Dally M tally before he conceded yet another hamstring injury (grade 2 strain), ruling him out for 13 weeks.

Trbojevic made his injury return in round 19 of the 2020 NRL season against the Gold Coast Titans, where the Manly-Warringah Sea Eagles lost 24–42. During that match, he yet again injured himself, injuring his left shoulder in the 52nd minute, which ruled him out of their round 20 clash against the New Zealand Warriors, and the 2020 NRL State of Origin series.

=== 2021 ===
After suffering an off season hamstring injury, Trbojevic missed the first five rounds of the 2021 NRL season returning to the Manly-Warringah side for round 6 and put in a man of the match performance as Manly defeated the Gold Coast 36–0.

In round 9 of the 2021 NRL season, he played his 100th first grade game and put in a man of the match performance as Manly-Warringah defeated New Zealand Warriors 38–32.

The following week, he scored another two tries in Manly's 50–6 victory over Brisbane.

On 30 May, he was selected for game one of the 2021 State of Origin series in which he was man of the match scoring a hat-trick in New South Wales’ 50–6 victory over Queensland.

In round 15, he scored a hat-trick in Manly's 56–24 victory over the Gold Coast. The following week, he scored a second consecutive hat-trick in Manly's 66–0 victory over Canterbury.

He claimed the Wally Lewis Medal after an Origin series.

In round 20, he scored a hat-trick in the battle of the beaches rivalry match against Cronulla with Manly running out 40–22 winners.

In round 22, he was involved in an accidental head knock with teammate Jason Saab, and was subsequently rested the following week as a precaution.

In round 24, he scored a hat-trick in Manly's 36–18 win over Wooden Spooners Canterbury. In the final round of the regular season, Trbojevic scored yet another hat-trick in Manly's 46–18 victory over North Queensland.

In week two of the 2021 Finals Series, he scored two tries in a 42–6 victory over the Sydney Roosters.

Ending the season, he won the Dally M Medal For Player Of The Year, Roy Bull ‘Best and Fairest’ Award and set a new season record number of tries for Manly, scoring 28 in just 18 games.

He finished 2021 by winning the Brad Fittler Medal as the best NSW player for the 2021 State of Origin series.

=== 2022 ===
In round 11 of the 2022 NRL season, Trbojevic was taken from the field during Manly's 22–20 loss against Parramatta. It was later revealed after the match that Trbojevic had dislocated his shoulder and would be out for the rest of the season. In December 2022, Manly announced that Trbojevic was expected to head to United States of America for rehabilitation in 2023.

=== 2023 ===
In round 3 of the 2023 NRL season, Trbojevic scored two tries in Manly's 34–30 victory over Parramatta. In round 12, Trbojevic scored a hat-trick in Manly's 42–18 upset victory over Canberra. On 22 May, Trbojevic was selected by New South Wales for game one of the 2023 State of Origin series. In round 15, Trbojevic scored two tries for Manly in their 58–18 victory over the Dolphins. Three minutes into origin 2 Trbojevic was taken from the field after getting injured attempting to tackle maroons fullback Reece Walsh it was later announced Trbojevic would miss the remainder of the 2023 season with a pectoral injury.

=== 2024 ===
During Manly's round 10 loss against the Dolphins in the 2024 NRL season, Trbojevic was taken from the field with a hamstring injury. It was later announced that Trbojevic could potentially be ruled out for 6–8 weeks. In round 20, Trbojevic score two tries for Manly in their 38–8 win over the Gold Coast. In round 25, Trbojevic scored a hat-trick in Manly's 34–26 upset loss to the Wests Tigers. He played 20 matches for Manly in the 2024 NRL season as they finished 7th on the table and qualified for the finals. Manly would be eliminated in the second week of the finals by the Sydney Roosters.

Despite carrying a shoulder injury into the Finals, Trbojevic declared himself available for selection for Australia in the 2024 Pacific Championships and Kangaroos coach Mal Meninga wasted no time in selecting him. In his first time playing for Australia since 2018, Turbo would play all three of Australia's games in the championships in the centres. He scored a 70-metre intercept try in the opening 18–0 win over Tonga at in Brisbane (easily out-pacing young Manly teammate and Tongan fullback Lehi Hopoate during the run, as well as the rest of the Tongan defence), then ran for over 200 metres against New Zealand in a 22–10 win in Christchurch. In the Final of the Pacific Championships against Tonga at home in Sydney, Trbojevic scored two tries and had two more disallowed by the bunker in the three minutes before halftime as Australia wrapped up the series with a 20–14 win.

=== 2025 ===
On 30 March, it was announced that Trbojevic would miss at least a month with an MCL injury. Trbojevic played 18 games for Manly in the 2025 NRL season as the club finished 10th on the table, missing the finals. On 28 October, Manly announced that Trbojevic had re-signed with the club until the end of 2027. In November 2025, Manly announced that Trbojevic will be the next captain despite signing new deal last month to extend his stay until the end of the 2027 season.

=== 2026 ===
In round 7 of 2026 NRL season against the North Queensland Cowboys, Trbojevic was forced to leave the field and missed up to 6-8 weeks due to a hamstring injury.

In round 20, Trbojevic had another hamstring injury again after 38-32 loss against the Gold Coast Titans.

In October 2026, The Australian Kangaroos confirmed that Trbojevic has been selected in their squad as a winger for the 2026 Rugby League World Cup. The selection was a surprising one as he hasn't been selected to play in the team for the last 2 years, which includes the position that he hasn't played in for 8 years. Despite this the makeshift winger finished the tournament as its joint top try scorer with 9 tries, including 1 in Australia's win over New Zealand in the final.

== Statistics ==
=== Manly Warringah ===
Season	Team	Games	Tries	Assists	Points
2015	Manly Warringah Sea Eagles	9	8	0	32
2016	Manly Warringah Sea Eagles	23	10	11	40
2017	Manly Warringah Sea Eagles	23	12	19	48
2018	Manly Warringah Sea Eagles	22	9	14	36
2019	Manly Warringah Sea Eagles	12	5	8	20
2020	Manly Warringah Sea Eagles	7	4	7	16
2021	Manly Warringah Sea Eagles	18	28	28	112
2022	Manly Warringah Sea Eagles	7	2	3	8
2023	Manly Warringah Sea Eagles	11	10	8	40
2024	Manly Warringah Sea Eagles	20	17	17	68
2025	Manly Warringah Sea Eagles	18	6	12	24
2026	Manly Warringah Sea Eagles	14	8	12	32
2027	Manly Warringah Sea Eagles				
Total		184	119	139	476

=== New South Wales ===
Season	Team	Games	Tries	Points
2018	New South Wales	3	2	8
2019	New South Wales	2	3	12
2021	New South Wales	3	4	16
2023	New South Wales	2	0	0
Total		10	9	36

=== Australia ===
Season	Team	Games	Tries	Points
2017–2026	Australia	11	16	64

^{Last updated: 31 October 2026}

== Honours ==
Representative

- Rugby League World Cup Champion: 2026
