= 2021 State of Origin series =

Australian interstate rugby series

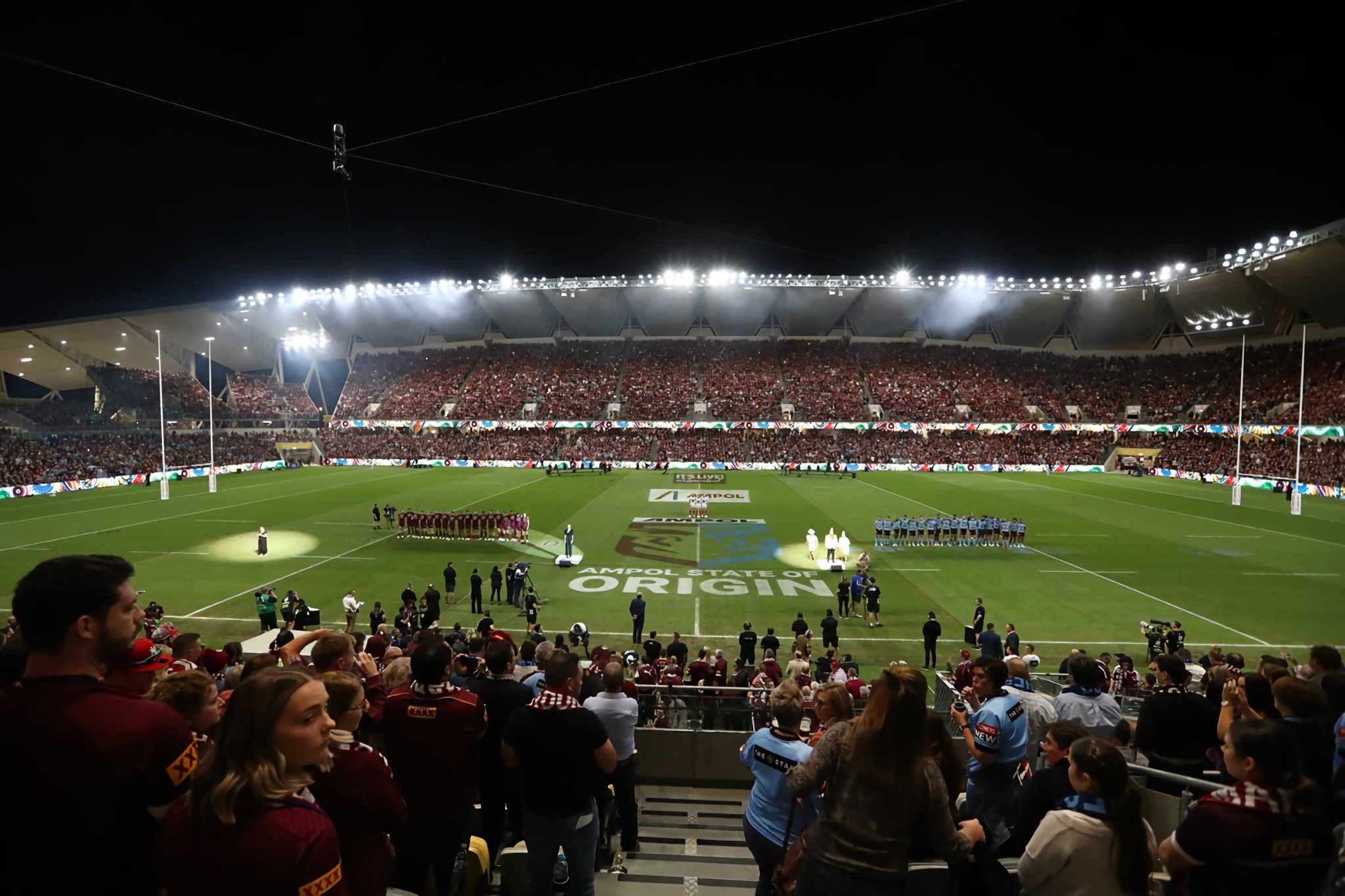
- Won by: New South Wales (16th title)
- Series margin: 2–1
- Points scored: 120
- Attendance: 106,112 (ave. 35,371 per match)
- Player of the series: Tom Trbojevic
- Top points scorer(s): Nathan Cleary (26)
- Top try scorer(s): Latrell Mitchell & Tom Trbojevic (4)

The 2021 State of Origin series was the 40th annual best-of-three series between the Queensland and New South Wales rugby league teams. Before this series, Queensland has won 22 times, NSW 15 times, with two series drawn.

The venue for Game 1 was originally named as the Melbourne Cricket Ground, however, due to a COVID-19 outbreak in Melbourne during the lead up to the match, it was relocated to Queensland Country Bank Stadium in Townsville. Game 2 was played at Suncorp Stadium as scheduled. Game 3 was originally scheduled to be played at Stadium Australia in Sydney, however was moved, firstly, to McDonald Jones Stadium in Newcastle due to the deteriorating COVID-19 situation in Sydney, before being relocated again, to Cbus Super Stadium in Gold Coast. These relocations meant that the series was the first entirely staged in a single state and the first games held in both Townsville and on the Gold Coast.

== Game I ==
Wednesday, 9 June 2021
8:10pm (AEST)

Queensland	6 – 50	New South Wales
Tries: Kurt Capewell (35') 1 Goals: Valentine Holmes 1/1 (36')	1st: 6 – 20; 2nd: 0 – 30	Tries: 3 (18', 59', 69') Tom Trbojevic; 2 (22', 27') Brian To'o; 2 (49', 60') Latrell Mitchell; 1 (63') Daniel Saifiti; Goals: 8/8 Nathan Cleary (10' pen, 19', 29', 51', 60', 62', 66', 70'); 1/1 Latrell Mitchell (24')

Queensland Country Bank Stadium, Townsville
Attendance: 27,533
Referee: Gerard Sutton
Player of the Match: Tom Trbojevic

== Game II ==
Sunday, 27 June 2021
7:50pm (AEST)

Queensland	0 – 26	New South Wales
	1st: 0 – 18; 2nd: 0 – 8	Tries: 2 (12', 70') Josh Addo-Carr; 1 (26') Latrell Mitchell; 1 (33') Tom Trbojevic; Goals: 5/5 Nathan Cleary (14', 28', 34', 50' pen, 71')

Suncorp Stadium, Brisbane
Attendance: 52,273
Referee: Gerard Sutton
Player of the Match: James Tedesco

== Game III ==
Wednesday, 14 July 2021
8:10pm (AEST)

New South Wales	18 – 20	Queensland
Tries: Latrell Mitchell (11') 1 Jack Wighton (48') 1 Apisai Koroisau (69') 1 Goals: Latrell Mitchell 3/4 (12', 50', 70')	1st: 6 – 8; 2nd: 12 – 12	Tries: 2 (57', 64') Ben Hunt; 1 (18') Hamiso Tabuai-Fidow; Goals: 2/2 Valentine Holmes (5' pen, 20'); 2/2 Daly Cherry-Evans (59', 65')

Cbus Super Stadium, Gold Coast
Attendance: 26,307
Referee: Gerard Sutton
Player of the Match: Ben Hunt

== Teams ==
=== New South Wales Blues ===
Position	Game 1	Game 2	Game 3
Fullback	James Tedesco (c)		
Wing	Brian To'o		
Centre	Latrell Mitchell		
Centre	Tom Trbojevic		
Wing	Josh Addo-Carr		
Five-eighth	Jarome Luai		Jack Wighton
Halfback	Nathan Cleary		Mitchell Moses
Prop	Daniel Saifiti		Junior Paulo
Hooker	Damien Cook		
Prop	Jake Trbojevic	Junior Paulo	Dale Finucane
Second row	Cameron Murray		
Second row	Tariq Sims		
Lock	Isaah Yeo		
Interchange	Jack Wighton		Apisai Koroisau
Interchange	Junior Paulo	Angus Crichton	
Interchange	Payne Haas		
Interchange	Liam Martin		
Coach	Brad Fittler		

=== Queensland Maroons ===
Position	Game 1	Game 2	Game 3
Fullback	Valentine Holmes		Kalyn Ponga
Wing	Xavier Coates	Kyle Feldt	Valentine Holmes
Centre	Kurt Capewell		Dane Gagai
Centre	Dane Gagai		Hamiso Tabuai-Fidow
Wing	Kyle Feldt	Xavier Coates	
Five-eighth	Cameron Munster		
Halfback	Daly Cherry-Evans (c)		
Prop	Christian Welch		
Hooker	Harry Grant	Andrew McCullough	Ben Hunt
Prop	Tino Fa'asuamaleaui	Josh Papalii	
Second row	Felise Kaufusi	Jai Arrow	Kurt Capewell
Second row	David Fifita	Felise Kaufusi	
Lock	Jai Arrow	Tino Fa'asuamaleaui	
Interchange	AJ Brimson	Ben Hunt	AJ Brimson
Interchange	Jaydn Su'a	David Fifita	Tom Flegler
Interchange	Moeaki Fotuaika		
Interchange	Joe Ofahengaue	Francis Molo	
Coach	Paul Green		

1 - With the State of Origin series returning to the middle of the NRL season, Wayne Bennett would step back from his head coaching role with Queensland, Paul Green picking up the job for 2021.

== Player debuts ==
=== Game 1 ===
- Cap no. 293, Jarome Luai
- Cap no. 294, Brian To'o
- Cap no. 295, Liam Martin
- Cap no. 218, Kyle Feldt

=== Game 2 ===
- Cap no. 219, Francis Molo

=== Game 3 ===
- Cap no. 296, Mitchell Moses
- Cap no. 297, Apisai Koroisau
- Cap no. 220, Hamiso Tabuai-Fidow
- Cap no. 221, Thomas Flegler

== Women's State of Origin ==
The 2021 Women's State of Origin game was played on 25 June at the Sunshine Coast Stadium and was won 8–6 by Queensland. The women's under-19s match was played as a curtain-raiser to the senior game was won 16–12 by New South Wales.

== Wheelchair State of Origin ==
The Wheelchair State of Origin game was postponed until January 2022 when it was played behind closed doors at the Whitlam Leisure Centre, Liverpool. Queensland defeated New South Wales 50–30 to win the contest for the first time

Saturday, 29 January 2022
3:00pm (AEDT)

Queensland	50 – 30	New South Wales
Tries: 9 P Arbuckle 10', 41', 44' 3 Z Schumacher 16', 27', 58' 3 A Tannock 3', 31' 2 J Hill 73' 1 Goals: 7 B McKenna 3', 11', 17', 41', 59', 74' (6/7); S Harre 28' (1/2)	1st: 28 – 18; 2nd: 22 – 12; Report	Tries: 5; 2 C Cannane 13', 21'; 2 R Engels 55', 77'; 1 D Karim 6'; Goals: 5 D Karim 22', 56', 78' (3/3); B Henman 7', 14' (2/2)

Whitlam Leisure Centre, Liverpool
Attendance: 0 (Note: The game was played behind closed doors due to New South Wales' COVID-19 policies.)
Player of the Match: Bayley McKenna
