= Morgan Harper =

New Zealand rugby league player

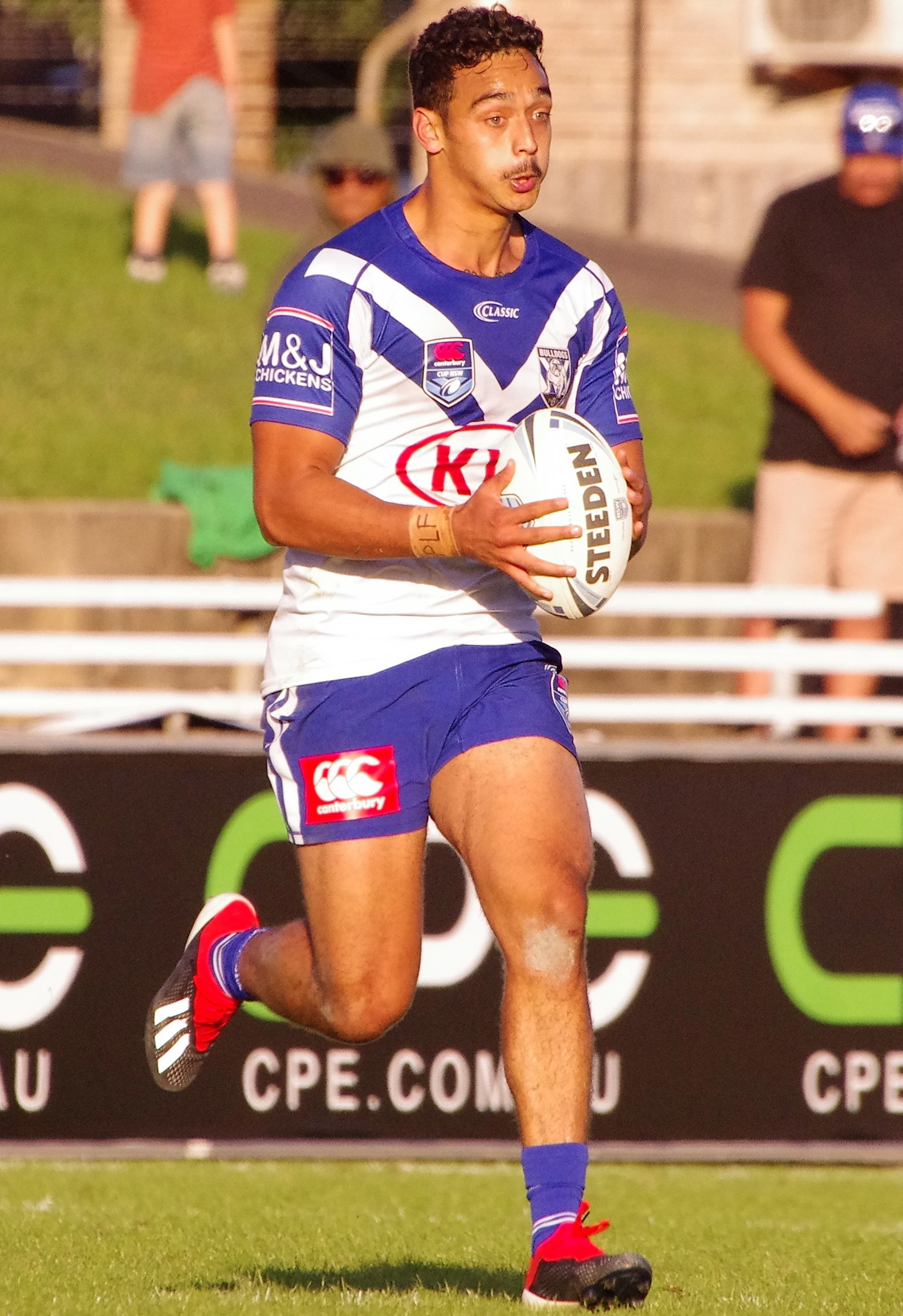

Personal information
- Born: 28 August 1998 (age 28) Hamilton, New Zealand
- Height: 186 cm (6 ft 1 in)
- Weight: 95 kg (14 st 13 lb)

Playing information
- Position: Centre
Club
Years	Team	Pld	T	G	FG	P
2019–20	Canterbury Bulldogs	2	0	0	0	0
2020–23	Manly Sea Eagles	54	15	0	0	60
2024	Parramatta Eels	8	4	0	0	16
	Total	64	19	0	0	76
Representative
Years	Team	Pld	T	G	FG	P
2018	Junior Kiwis	1	0	0	0	0
2019	NSW Residents	1	0	1	0	2
2022–23	Māori All Stars	2	0	0	0	0
- Source: As of 25 May 2024

Morgan Harper (born 28 August 1998) is a New Zealand professional rugby league footballer who last played as a centre.

He previously played in the National Rugby League (NRL) for the Canterbury-Bankstown Bulldogs, Manly-Warringah Sea Eagles, and Parramatta Eels.

== Background ==
Harper was born in Hamilton, New Zealand. Harper is of Māori (Ngāti Maniapoto mother and Ngāti Tūwharetoa father) and Irish descent.

He played his junior rugby league for the Ngaruawahia Panthers in the Waikato Rugby League.

== Career ==
Harper made his NRL debut for Canterbury-Bankstown against the Brisbane Broncos in round 25 of the 2019 NRL season. In round 17 of the 2020 NRL season, Harper scored two tries for Manly-Warringah in a 34–32 defeat against the Wests Tigers at Brookvale Oval. In round 19 of the 2021 NRL season, he scored a hat-trick for Manly in their 44–24 victory over the Wests Tigers. Harper played a total of 18 games for Manly in the 2022 NRL season scoring four tries as the club finished 11th on the table and missed out on the finals.

=== 2023 ===
Harper was limited to only nine appearances for Manly in the 2023 NRL season as the club missed the finals. On 16 October 2023, Harper signed a one-year deal to join Parramatta starting in 2024.

=== 2024 ===
In round 1 of the 2024 NRL season, Harper made his club debut for Parramatta and scored a try as they defeated arch-rivals Canterbury 26–8. Following a couple of indifferent performances to start the 2024 season, Harper was demoted to reserve grade by Parramatta head coach Brad Arthur.

Harper made only eight appearances for Parramatta in the 2024 season as the club finished 15th on the table. On 11 September 2024, it was announced that Harper would be departing the Parramatta club after not being offered a new contract. On 17 November, it was announced that Harper signed with NSW Cup side North Sydney Bears for the 2025 season.

=== 2025 ===
On 25 February, North Sydney announced that Harper would depart the club and sign with the New Zealand Warriors for the 2025 season. On 26 February, the Warriors confirmed Harper had signed on with the team for the 2025 season to bolster their outside backs. On 10 December 2025, after his exit from the Warriors, the Newtown Jets announced the signing of Harper.

== Statistics ==
Year	Team	Games	Tries	Pts
2019	Canterbury-Bankstown Bulldogs	1	0	0
2020	Canterbury-Bankstown Bulldogs	1	0	0
2020	Manly Warringah Sea Eagles	4	3	12
2021	Manly Warringah Sea Eagles	23	8	32
2022	Manly Warringah Sea Eagles	18	4	16
2023	Manly Warringah Sea Eagles	9	0	0
2024	Parramatta Eels	8	4	16
2025	Warriors	0		
	Totals	64	19	76
