= James Tedesco =

Australia and Italy international rugby league footballer

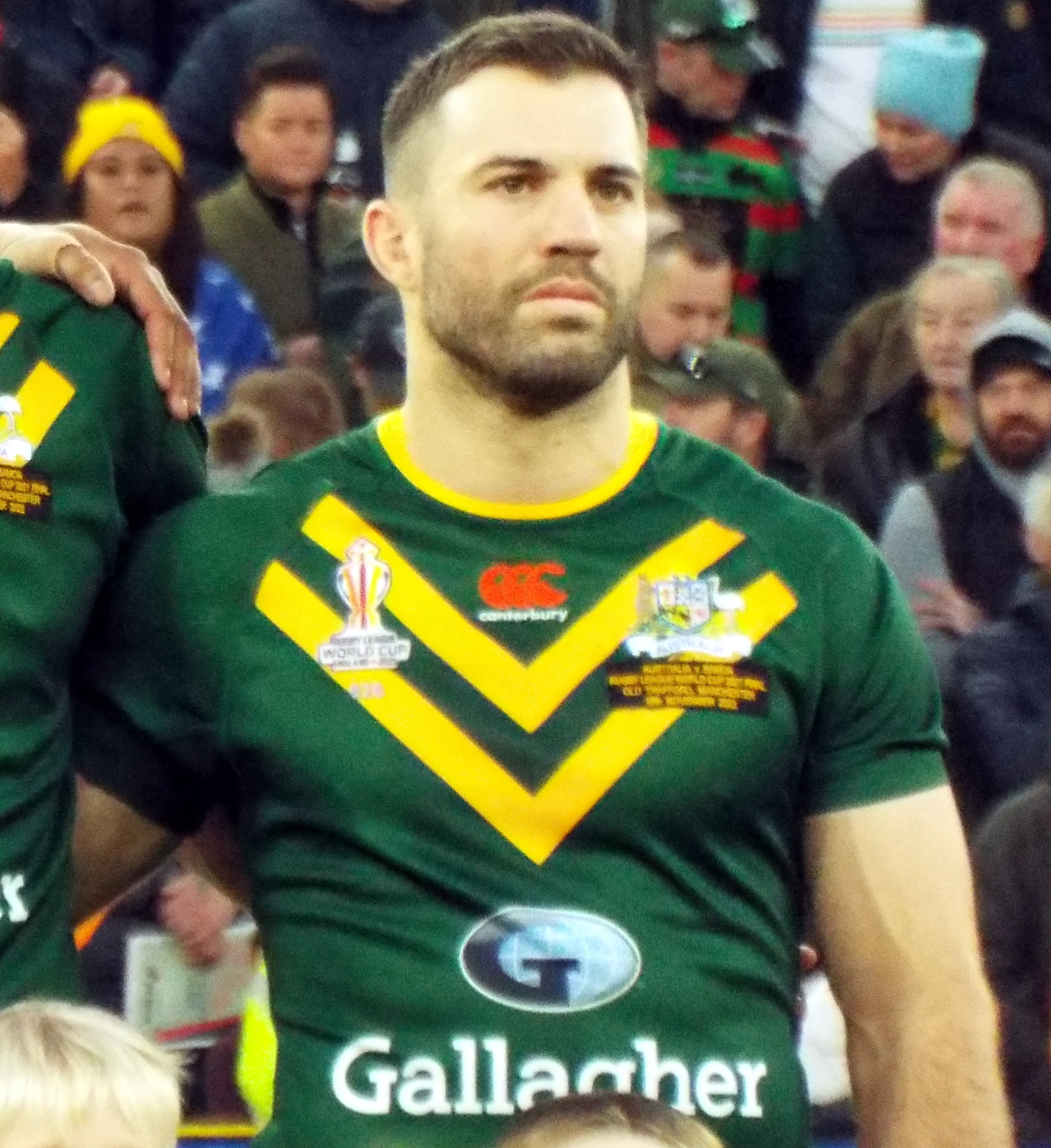

Personal information
- Full name: James Tedesco
- Born: January 8, 1993 (age 33) Ryde, New South Wales, Australia
- Height: 184 cm (6 ft 0 in)
- Weight: 95 kg (14 st 13 lb)

Playing information
- Position: Fullback
Club
Years	Team	Pld	T	G	FG	P
2012–17	Wests Tigers	90	50	0	0	200
2018–	Sydney Roosters	207	111	5	0	454
	Total	297	161	5	0	654
Representative
Years	Team	Pld	T	G	FG	P
2013–15	NSW City	2	1	0	0	4
2013–17	Italy	6	3	0	0	12
2016–26	New South Wales	26	9	0	0	36
2016–17	Prime Minister's XIII	2	3	0	0	12
2018–26	Australia	15	9	0	0	36
- Source: As of 22 November 2026

James Tedesco (born 8 January 1993), nicknamed "Teddy", is a professional rugby league footballer who captains and plays as a fullback for the Sydney Roosters in the National Rugby League. A former Australia and New South Wales captain.

He previously played for the Wests Tigers in the National Rugby League. Tedesco was fullback for the Roosters teams that won the 2018 NRL Grand Final, 2019 NRL Grand Final, 2026 NRL Grand Final , 2019 World Club Challenge, and the 2020 World Club Challenge. Tedesco initially played for Italy at international level as a centre, fullback and five-eighth from 2013 to 2017 before playing for Australia in 2018 at fullback and captaining the 2022 Rugby League World Cup win. Tedesco played for New South Wales in the State of Origin series from 2016 to 2026, and captained the side from Game 2 2020 to Game 3 2023. He has played at representative level for the Prime Minister's XIII and played both fullback and wing for New South Wales City.

== Background ==
Tedesco was born in the northern Sydney suburb of Ryde, New South Wales, Australia. His father is of Italian descent. He was raised on a 100 hectare property in Menangle in the Macarthur region of south-western Sydney, complete with his own football field with goal posts. Tedesco played his junior football with the Camden Rams. His father said of his early years, "James couldn't even make the junior rep squad for Wests when he was 14, and from then on he's always sort of scraped in. But once he's made those teams, he's gone on to finish as the best player."

Tedesco was a student of St Gregory's College, Campbelltown. It was here where he also dabbled in soccer, and rugby union. He was in year 7 when Chris Lawrence was studying year 12, at which point Lawrence had already debuted 1st Grade for their local NRL team Wests Tigers, for whom Tedesco would go on to debut.

== Playing career ==
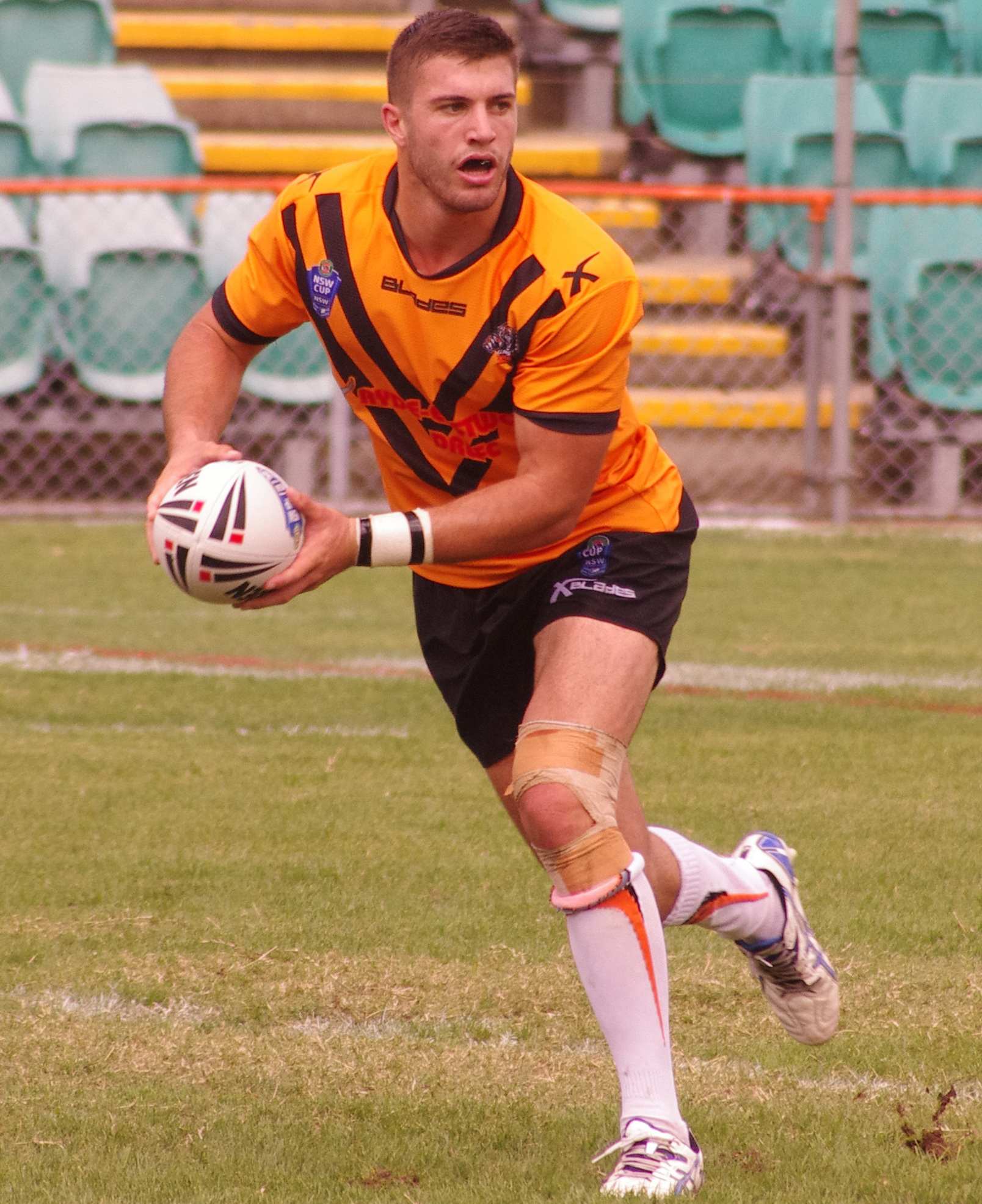
Tedesco playing for the Tigers in 2013

=== Early career ===
Tedesco played on the wing for the Western Suburbs Magpies in the Harold Matthews Cup competition, with David Nofoaluma at fullback.

In 2010, he made the Australian Schoolboys team. "I made the Australian Schoolboys and I learnt to just have confidence in my own ability. I realised it was there – that I had a bit of talent – I just needed the confidence to show it," he said.

Tedesco commenced the 2011 season playing in the S. G. Ball Cup, but was promoted to the Wests Tigers NYC team from round 13. In just his third game he equaled the club record of scoring 4 tries in one match, and went on to be named the team's player of the year.

=== 2012 ===
Attracting the attention of other clubs, Tedesco was the focus of a "bidding war" between the Wests Tigers and St George Illawarra, resulting in the Tigers signing him until the end of 2014. Weeks later, he was named at fullback for the team's first trial-match for the year. However, coach Tim Sheens said he was unlikely to be playing at fullback at the start of the regular season, saying, "I don't necessarily want to throw that on him at this point. I've got some experienced options."

Having played well in both pre-season trials, Tedesco was named in the starting team to play the Cronulla-Sutherland Sharks in the first game of the season. After showing potential in the early stages of the game, Tedesco suffered an injury to his knee in the 30th minute. The tear to the anterior cruciate ligament in his left knee was the end of his season. Team-mate Benji Marshall said, "Just seeing his reaction in the sheds, he was crying in there and it brought a tear to a few of the boys' eyes as well, because we see him as such a great talent and he's fitted into the squad well and he's a really good kid."

=== 2013 ===
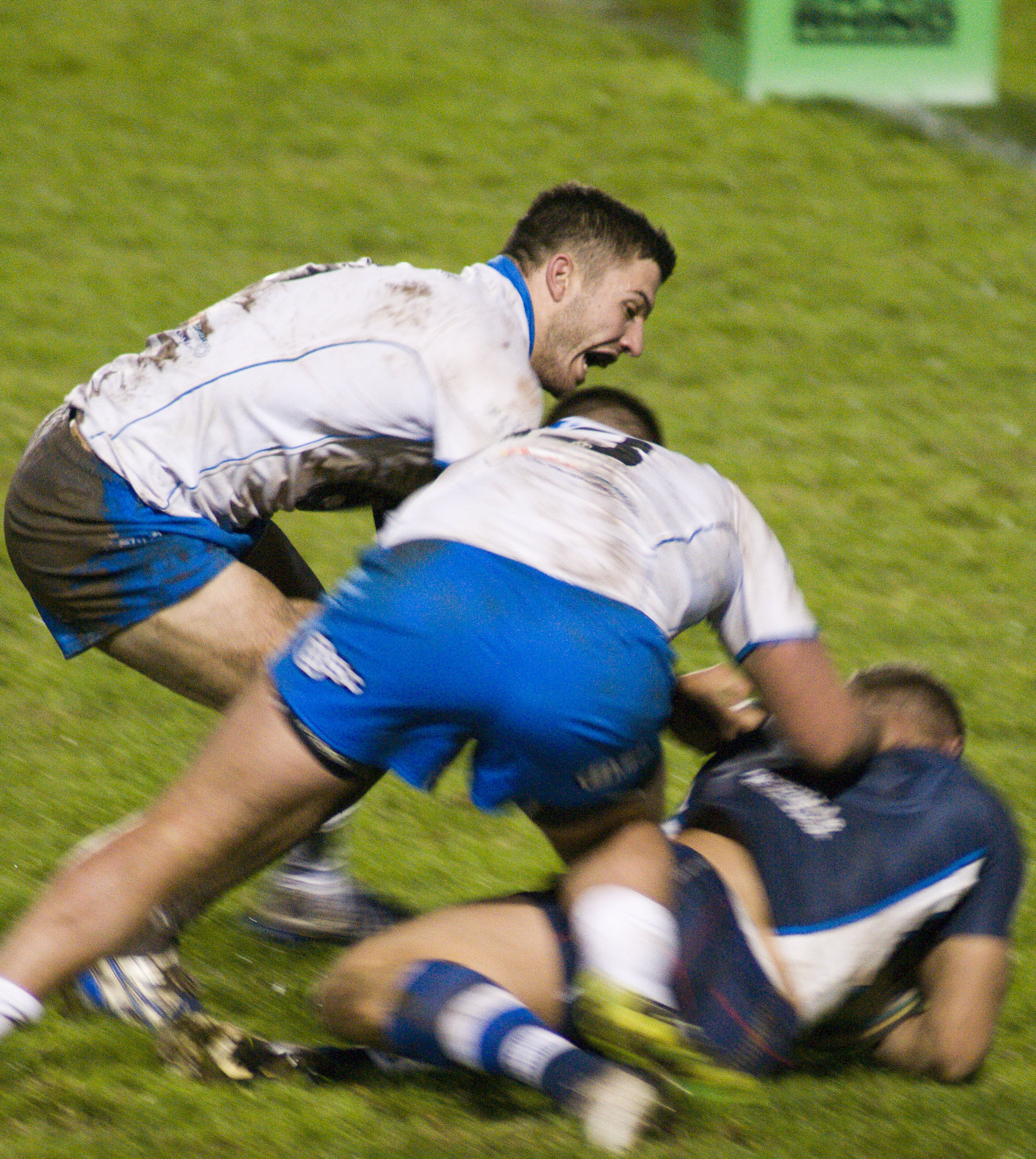
Tedesco playing for Italy at the 2013 Rugby League World Cup

Tedesco returned to first grade in round 4 of the 2013 season, and played on the wing for four weeks.

In April, he was chosen to play for NSW City in the annual City vs Country Origin match. Having only appeared in four NRL matches at that time, he was the least experienced player to ever participate in the match. "When they called me up, I thought it was a joke. Even when Brad Fittler got on the phone I didn't think it was real. It was also a problem, because I didn't know whether I was eligible for City or Country," Tedesco said. Tedesco played at fullback in City's 18–12 loss at Coffs Harbour.

With Tim Moltzen moving to halfback before suffering a season-ending injury, Tedesco played most of the rest of the season at fullback, scoring 8 tries in 19 matches. He spent months playing with a cracked fibula, after being advised that he was unlikely to make the injury any worse by playing. Tedesco said the leg was painful when knocked. "It does kill for about five minutes or so, then you run it off and it goes away."

At the end of the season, Tedesco was chosen to represent Italy at the 2013 Rugby League World Cup. With Anthony Minichiello captaining and playing at fullback, Tedesco played at right centre for the three games. In his international debut, he scored a try as Italy defeated Wales 32–16.

=== 2014 ===
In February, Tedesco was selected in the Tigers inaugural Auckland Nines squad.

On 27 May, he signed a 3-year contract with the Canberra Raiders starting in 2015. A week later, Tedesco back flipped on his deal with the Raiders to stay with the Tigers. During the round 16 clash with the Raiders, Tedesco lasted 15 seconds before he fractured his patella. Tedesco missed the rest of the season. Tedesco said, "On Twitter Canberra fans would say 'I hope you break your legs' and stuff like that and then I play Canberra and it happens. It is a bit weird. It was just a freak accident." Before the end of the year, Tedesco had returned to sprint training and was adjusting his running style to be less "low to the ground".

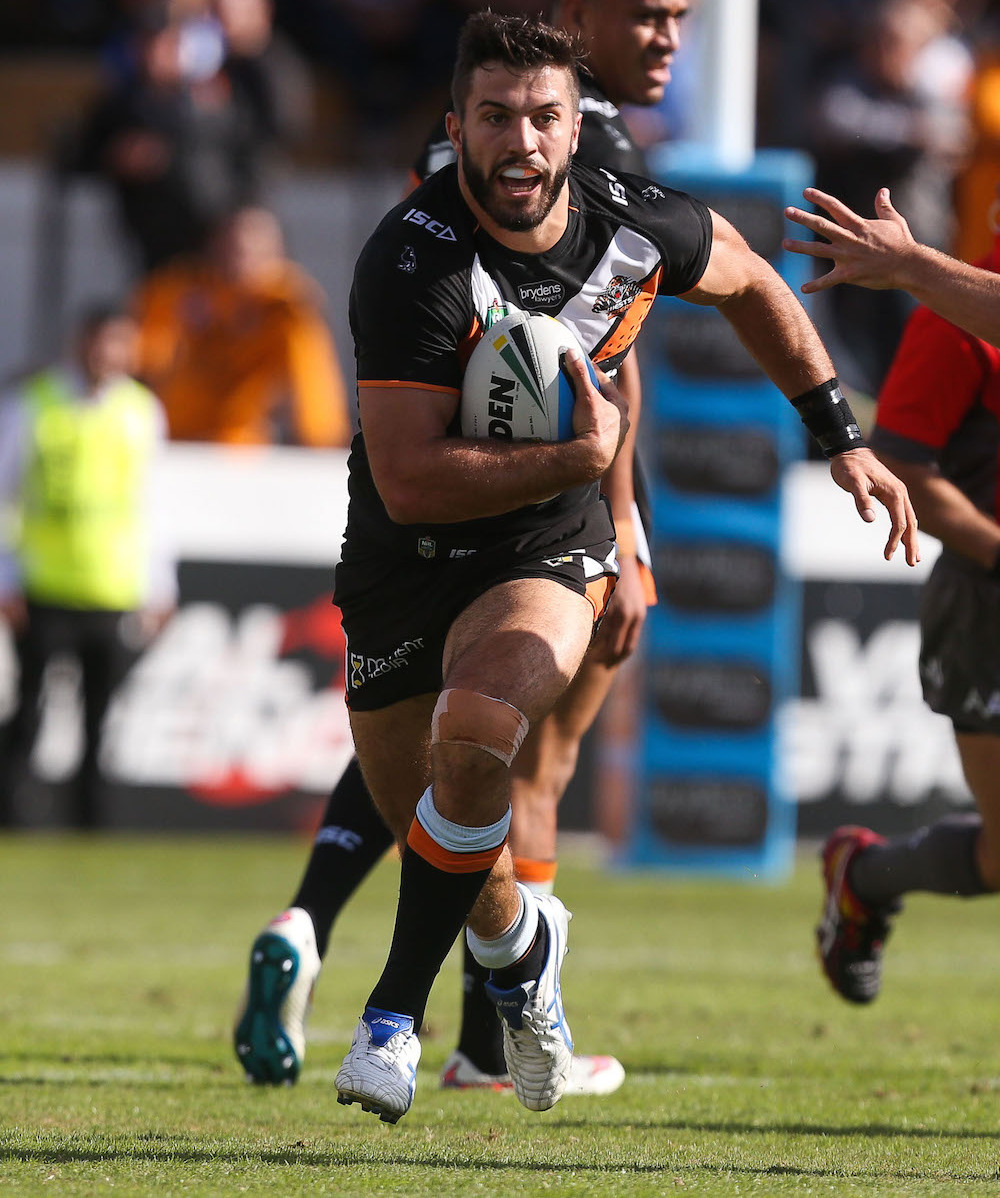
Tedesco playing for the Wests Tigers in 2015

He finished the NRL season with 8 matches and 6 tries.

=== 2015 ===
After an "eye-catching" display in round 2, Tedesco was touted as a possible State of Origin selection. While Tedesco said he felt ready to play in the representative matches, coach Jason Taylor said, "I think that's too early. It was a really good first half and he showed what he can do, but I think that's a bit too early for where he's at."

Between 19 August 2013 and round 7 of the 2015 season, Tedesco had scored 18 tries in 19 appearances. He played in every game of 2015 and was the competition's leader for tackle breaks and the third highest try-scorer. From round 10 onwards, Tedesco ran for over 100 metres in each game, with the fourth highest total in the competition. He was named in the NRL website's Team of the Year and was a finalist for the Rugby League Players Association's highest honour, the Player's Player.

=== 2016 ===
Tedesco started the 2016 season by scoring 2 tries against the New Zealand Warriors in round 1 and his first career hat-trick against the Manly Warringah Sea Eagles in round 2. He suffered a shoulder injury in round 9, making him unavailable for the City Origin side. At the time of his injury he was the competition's leading try-scorer.

Considered a certainty to play for New South Wales in the first match of the State of Origin series, he was unavailable due to injury, and was not selected for the second when he returned from injury only weeks before. Making his debut in game 3, he ran for 258 metres, the most of any player in the game, as NSW won their only match of the series. It was said he "Showed enough in 80 minutes to suggest the No.1 jersey will be his for many years to come."

With Wests Tigers fighting to make the semis towards the end of the year, Tedesco had his jaw broken in a tackle from Ryan James, ending his season.

He recovered to represent the Prime Minister's XIII against Papua New Guinea, but left the field with concussion in the first half.

He scored 14 tries in 17 matches with the Tigers. He was named the fullback in the Dally M team of the year.

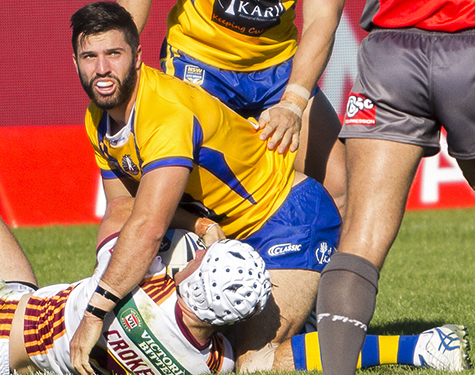
James Tedesco playing for the City side in 2015

=== 2017 ===
In March and April, Tedesco alongside Tigers captain Aaron Woods and halves partners Luke Brooks and Mitchell Moses attracted media attention, with speculation about where the players, dubbed as the "Big Four" would end after all of their contracts expired at season's end. On 3 May, it was announced that Tedesco signed a 4-year contract with the Sydney Roosters, starting in the 2018 season.

Tedesco played fullback in all 3 matches in the 2017 State of Origin series, scoring a try in the game 1 victory before going down the next 2 matches to lose the shield to Queensland.

Tedesco finished his last year with the Wests Tigers with him playing in 21 matches and scoring 5 tries.

On 12 September at the Rugby League Players' Association's awards night, Tedesco was voted player of the year by his peers.

On 23 September, Tedesco played fullback for Prime Minister's XIII against Papua New Guinea, scoring 3 tries in the 48–8 win in Port Moresby.

On 5 October 2017, after missing on selection in the Australia Kangaroos squad, Tedesco was instead named in the 24-man Italy squad for the 2017 Rugby League World Cup.

After Italy's shock 36–12 defeat by Ireland in Cairns in Game 1 of their pool matches, Tedesco was king hit by fellow Italian teammate Shannon Wakeman while having drinks at Pier Bar in Cairns. Tedesco was talking to Wakeman's girlfriend which led to the altercation. Tedesco then told Italian officials not to sack Wakeman over the incident and that it was just a misunderstanding. He went on to say "It was just a miscommunication between myself and him, there were a few drinks and it quickly escalated", "We were all there after the loss, we wanted to get away from it all a bit. It's sad it happened. The next morning we met, shook hands and he apologised". Tedesco played in all 3 matches and scored 2 tries in the tournament.

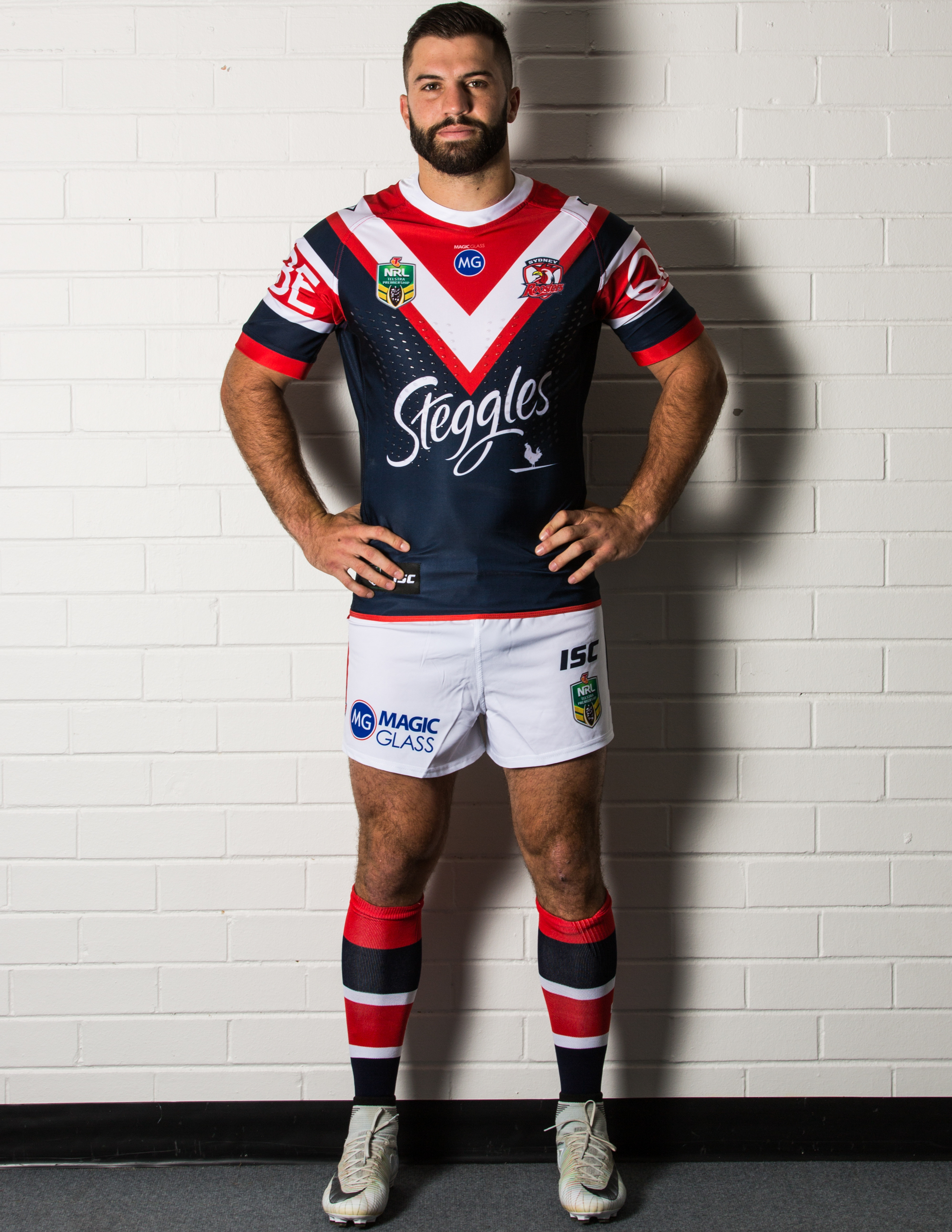
Tedesco in the Roosters kit in 2017

=== 2018 ===
Tedesco made his debut for the Sydney Roosters in a Round 1 loss to his former club of the Wests Tigers, starting at fullback, and was subjected to boos from the Tigers supporters every time he touched the ball. Having just recovered from a case of the mumps Tedesco was not at his best and bombed a certain try by dropping a pass from Blake Ferguson after he made a break down the touchline during the Roosters shock upset 10–8 loss at ANZ Stadium.

In Round 2 against the Canterbury-Bankstown Bulldogs, Tedesco scored his first try for the Roosters in the 30–12 win at Sydney Football Stadium.

On 28 May, Tedesco retained his spot at fullback for NSW, and earned his first Origin man of the match. On 10 September, Tedesco was awarded the Brad Fittler medal as being NSW's best player in the 2018 State of Origin series.

Tedesco was part of The Roosters side which won their fourth minor premiership in six years. On 30 September, Tedesco played at fullback in Sydney's 21–6 victory over Melbourne in the 2018 NRL grand final.

Tedesco's first year at the Roosters was capped off when he won the Jack Gibson Medal, awarded to the club's best player from the past year of football, as well as being named to debut for the Australian Kangaroos in Mal Meninga's 19 man squad.

=== 2019 ===
Tedesco played in all 3 games of New South Wales' successful origin campaign in 2019, ultimately winning the Wally Lewis Medal for best player in the series. He scored two tries in the deciding game at ANZ Stadium, the 2nd one winning NSW the game in the 79th minute.

On 2 October, Tedesco won the 2019 Dally M Medal as the NRL's best player with 34 votes.

At the end of the 2019 regular season, the Sydney Roosters finished in 2nd place on the table and qualified for the finals.

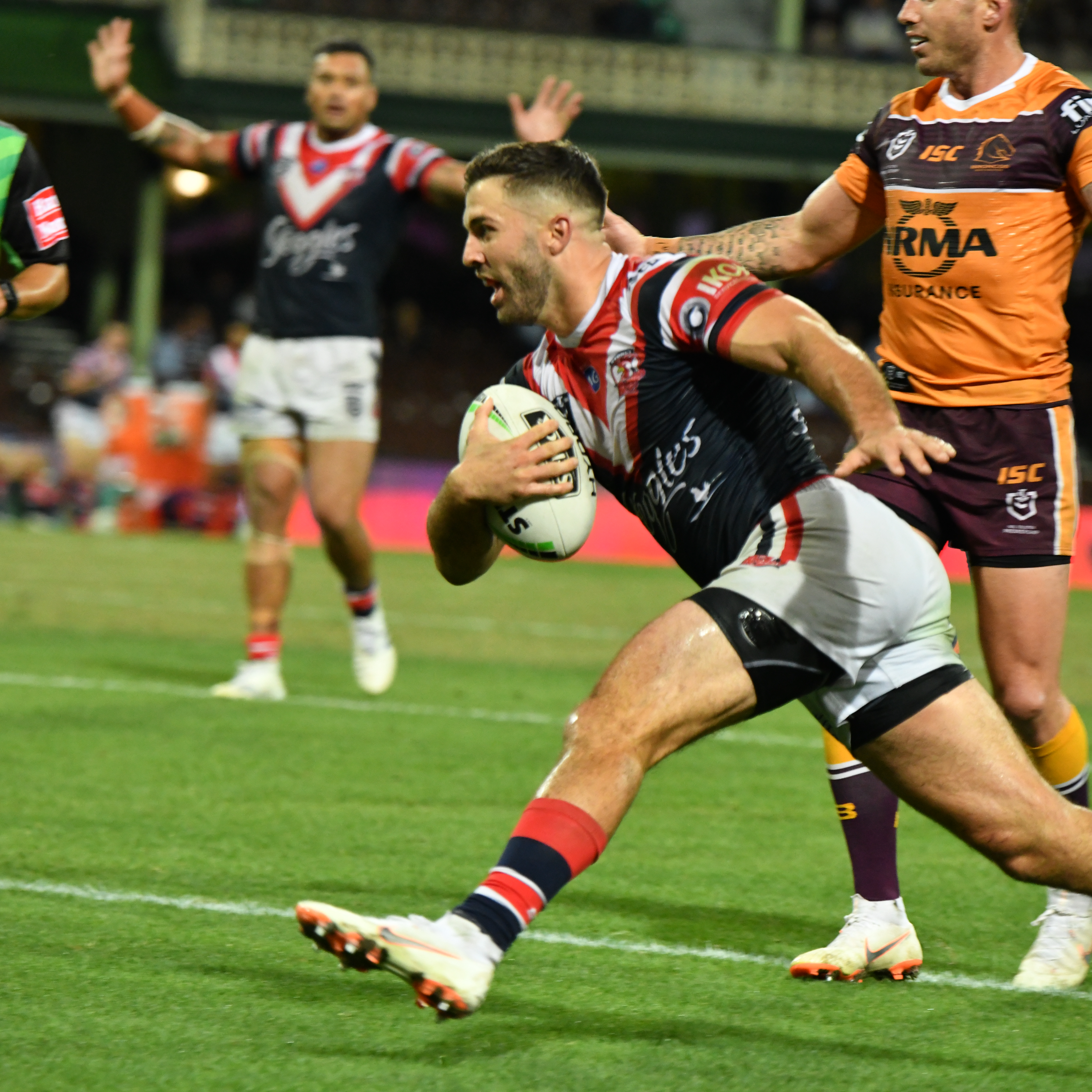
Tedesco playing for the Roosters in 2019

In the preliminary final against Melbourne, Tedesco scored the winning try in a 14–8 victory. In the 2019 NRL Grand Final against Canberra, Tedesco scored the winning try in the second half as the Sydney Roosters won their second consecutive premiership and also Tedesco's second premiership as a player.

On 7 October, Tedesco was named at Fullback in the Australian side for their Oceania Cup test against New Zealand.

=== 2020 ===
On 22 February, Tedesco played for the Roosters in their 2020 World Club Challenge victory defeating St Helens 20–12.

In round 5, Tedesco scored a hat-trick as the Sydney Roosters defeated Canterbury-Bankstown 42–6 at Bankwest Stadium. In round 17, he scored two tries as the Roosters defeated Canberra 18–6 in the grand final rematch at GIO Stadium.

In the 2020 semi final, Tedesco scored two tries as the Roosters lost 22–18 to Canberra at the Sydney Cricket Ground, ending their chance of winning a third straight premiership.

He was awarded the Jack Gibson Medal for the third year running, the first time this has been accomplished by any player,

Tedesco was selected by New South Wales for the 2020 State of Origin series. He played in all three matches and was captain for game 2 and 3, as Boyd Cordner was injured. Tedesco himself was injured in game 3 as New South Wales suffered a shock 2–1 series defeat against Queensland.

On 7 December, Tedesco signed a three-year contract extension to stay at the Sydney Roosters until the end of the 2024.

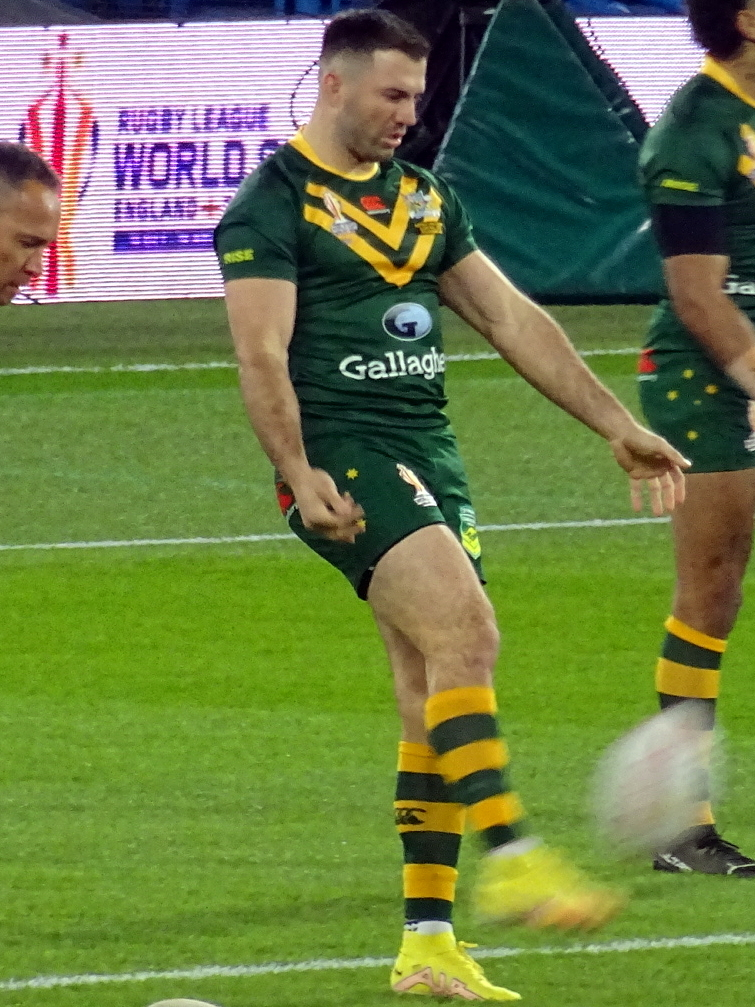
Tedesco warming up in 2022

=== 2021 ===
In round 1 of the 2021 NRL season, Tedesco scored a hat-trick in the Sydney Roosters 46–4 victory over Manly-Warringah at the Sydney Cricket Ground.

The following week, he scored two tries and kicked two goals against his former club, the Wests Tigers, in a 40–6 victory and captained the Roosters for the first time.

On 30 May, he was selected for game one of the 2021 State of Origin series.

In round 19, the Sydney Roosters defeated the Newcastle Knights 28–8 as Tedesco came up against the Maroons' Game III no. 1, Kalyn Ponga. He and his team fought back from being eight points down. Tedesco ran for 224 metres and had four try assists, four line-break assists and seven tackle breaks to lead his team to their 12th win of the season.

In round 22, he scored two tries for the Sydney Roosters in a 21–20 victory over Brisbane. The following week, Tedesco put in a man of the match performance, scoring a try and providing four try assists in the club's 40–22 victory over St. George Illawarra.

On 27 September 2021, Tedesco won the Dally M Captain of the Year. Tedesco played a total of 22 games for the Sydney Roosters in the 2021 NRL season including the club's two finals matches. The Sydney Roosters would be eliminated from the second week of the finals losing to Manly 42–6.

=== 2022 ===
In round 9 of the 2022 NRL season, Tedesco scored a hat-trick in the club's 44–16 victory over the Gold Coast. On 29 May, Tedesco was selected by New South Wales to play in game one of the 2022 State of Origin series.

Tedesco played in all three games for New South Wales as they lost the series 2–1.

Tedesco played a total of 24 games for the Sydney Roosters in 2022 scoring 13 tries. At the end of the season, Tedesco was announced as the Rugby League Players Association Players' Champion for a third time (he had previously won the player-voted award in 2017 and 2019).

In October he was named in the Australia squad for the 2021 Rugby League World Cup.

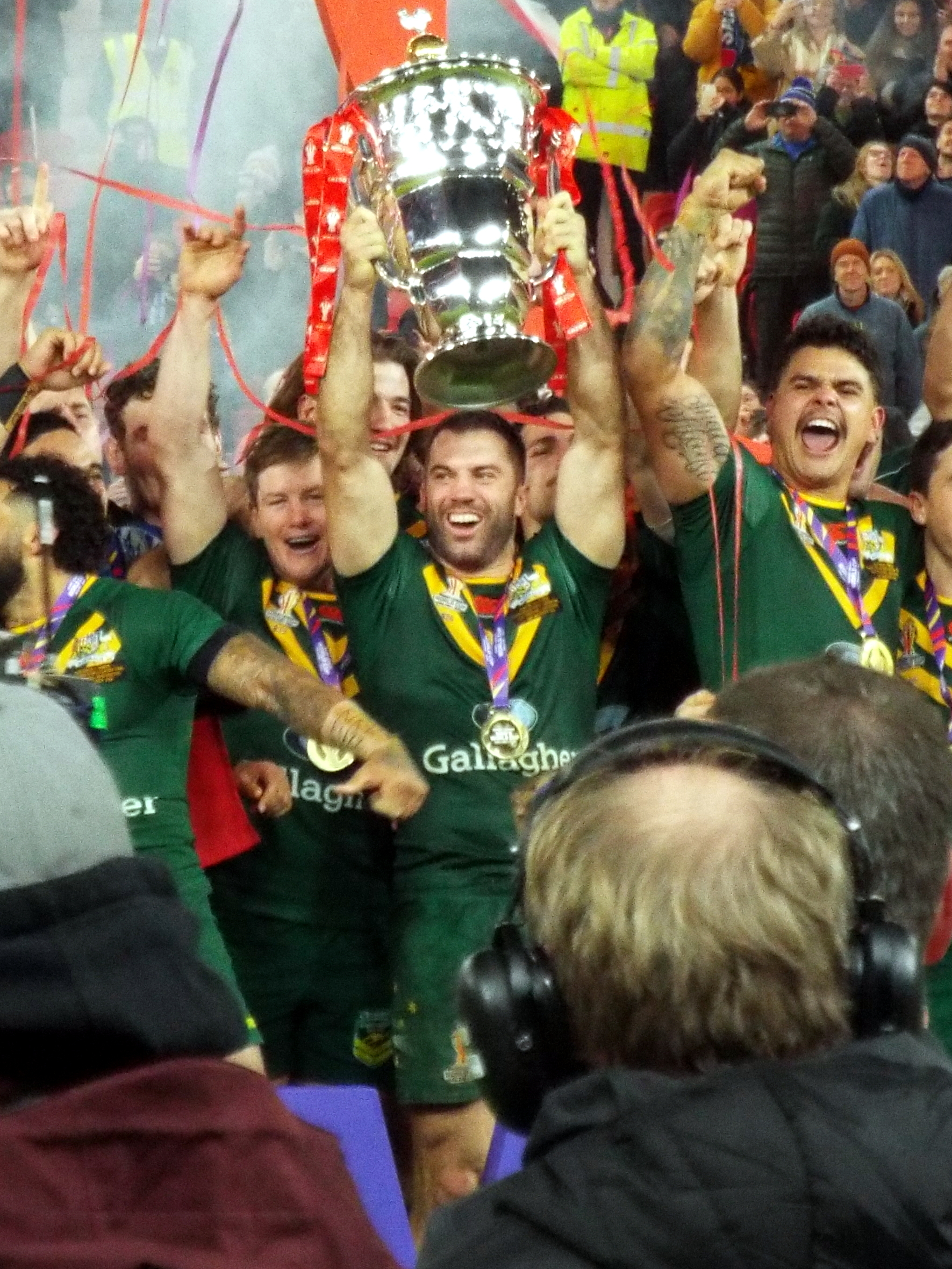
Tedesco lifting the RLWC trophy in 2022

Tedesco was part of the Australian side which won their 12th World Cup defeating Samoa 30–10 in the final with Tedesco being named man of the match after scoring two tries.

=== 2023 ===
On 22 May, Tedesco was named as the captain of New South Wales ahead of game one in the 2023 State of Origin series.

In round 14 of the 2023 NRL season, Tedesco scored two tries in the Sydney Roosters 25–24 victory over Canterbury.

Tedesco played in all three matches for New South Wales during the 2023 State of Origin series in which they lost 2–1. Tedesco was under intense media pressure to retain his spot in the team following underwhelming performances in game one and two, however he was retained for game three and provided a try assist for Bradman Best in the second half as New South Wales won 24–10.

In round 25, Tedesco scored two tries for the Sydney Roosters in their 34–12 victory over Parramatta. Tedesco was taken from the field in the second half after suffering a concussion.

Tedesco played 21 matches for the Sydney Roosters in the 2023 NRL season as the club finished 7th on the table and qualified for the finals. Tedesco played in both of the club's finals games as they were eliminated in the second week against Melbourne.

=== 2024 ===
In round 3 of the 2024 NRL season, Tedesco scored two tries for the Sydney Roosters in their 48–6 victory over arch-rivals South Sydney. In round 5 of the 2024 NRL season, Tedesco was taken from the field after suffering his 10th career concussion.

On 26 May, it was announced that Tedesco had not been picked by New South Wales ahead of the 2024 State of Origin series. Tedesco had previously been continually picked since 2016 and had played 22 State of Origin games in succession.

On 1 June, it was announced that Tedesco had been called into the New South Wales team for Game 1 to replace Dylan Edwards after he suffered a quad injury at training. He was subsequently left out of the team for the remainder of the series. Tedesco played 25 matches for the Sydney Roosters in the 2024 NRL season scoring 17 tries. Tedesco played in all three finals games for the club including their preliminary final loss against Melbourne.

=== 2025 ===
In round 8 of the 2025 NRL season, Tedesco scored two tries for the Sydney Roosters in their 46–18 win against St. George Illawarra. Tedesco played every game for the Sydney Roosters in the 2025 NRL season as the club finished 8th on the table and qualified for the finals. Tedesco played in the clubs elimination final loss against Cronulla. On 1 October, Tedesco won the 2025 Dally M Award as the competition's best player. Tedesco had finished 22 points ahead in the votes above second placed Nathan Cleary. On 20 November, the Sydney Roosters announced that Tedesco re-signed for a further year until the end of 2027.

=== 2026 ===
In May, Tedesco was selected by New South Wales for game one in the 2026 State of Origin series. Tedesco scored the match winning try for New South Wales in the final minute after he caught a high kick from Nathan Cleary. Tedesco played all three games for New South Wales as they won the series 2–1. Tedesco played 21 games for the Sydney Roosters in the 2026 NRL season including the clubs 2026 NRL Grand Final victory over Newcastle.

Tedesco was brought on from the interchange for the last 7 minutes of the Rugby League World Cup Final, in which Australia prevailed 32-12. After the match, Tedesco announced his immediate retirement from all representative rugby league.

== Honours ==
Individual

- Dally M Medal: 2019, 2025
- Clive Churchill Medal: 2026
- Wally Lewis Medal: 2019
- Dally M Fullback of the Year: 2016, 2019, 2022, 2024, 2025
- Dally M Captain of the Year: 2021, 2025
- RLPA Players' Champion: 2017, 2019, 2022, 2025
- RLPA Fullback of the Year: 2017, 2019, 2020, 2022, 2025, 2026
- Brad Fittler Medal: 2018, 2019, 2022
- Jack Gibson Medal: 2018, 2019, 2020, 2021, 2022, 2024, 2025

Roosters

- NRL Premiership: 2018, 2019, 2026
- NRL Minor Premiership: 2018
- World Club Challenge: 2019, 2020

New South Wales

- State of Origin Series: 2018, 2019, 2021, 2024, 2026

Australia

- Rugby League World Cup: 2021, 2026

== Statistics ==
Year	Team	Games	Tries	Goals	Pts
2012	Wests Tigers	1			
2013	Wests Tigers	19	8		32
2014	Wests Tigers	8	6		24
2015	Wests Tigers	24	17		68
2016	Wests Tigers	17	14		56
2017	Wests Tigers	21	5		20
2018	Sydney Roosters	25	9		36
2019	Sydney Roosters	24	18		72
2020	Sydney Roosters	19	11		44
2021	Sydney Roosters	22	9	5	46
2022	Sydney Roosters	24	13		52
2023	Sydney Roosters	22	11		44
2024	Sydney Roosters	25	17		68
2025	Sydney Roosters	25	11		44
2026	Sydney Roosters	21	12		48
2027	Sydney Roosters				
	Totals	297	161	5	654

=== Representative ===
State of Origin
Year	Team	Games	Tries	Pts
2016	NSW Blues	1	0	0
2017	NSW Blues	3	1	4
2018	NSW Blues	3	2	8
2019	NSW Blues	3	2	8
2020	NSW Blues	3	2	8
2021	NSW Blues	3	0	0
2022	NSW Blues	3	0	0
2023	NSW Blues	3	0	0
2024	NSW Blues	1	1	4
2026	NSW Blues	3	1	4
	Totals	26	9	36

International
Year	Team	Games	Tries	Pts
2013	Italy	6	1	4
2017	Italy	6	2	8
2018	Australia	14	2	8
2019	Australia	14	1	4
2022	Australia	14	5	20
2023	Australia	14	1	4
2026	Australia	14		
	Totals	20	12	48

== Personal life ==
Tedesco completed his PE Teacher degree at the Strathfield campus of Australian Catholic University in 2016.

== Controversy ==
On 25 October 2021, Tedesco was placed under investigation by the NRL after an alleged racist incident with a 20-year-old woman of Vietnamese descent at the Beach Road Hotel in Bondi. It is alleged by the woman that Tedesco approached her and shouted "squid games" before laughing with his group. The woman claimed she stood behind her friend who challenged Tedesco about the comment, before the Roosters captain allegedly laughed and asked the women whether they knew who he was. The Sydney Roosters club completed their own investigation into the matter and said they believed the incident was simply a matter of miscommunication.

On 12 November, Tedesco was fined $10,000 by the NRL for drunken and disorderly behaviour in relation to the incident.

The Sydney Roosters and Tedesco initially claimed that nothing inappropriate had occurred and that a misunderstanding had occurred, and no internal sanction was imposed. In March 2022, Tedesco addressed the media and stated that he had apologised for his behaviour to the female in question.
