= JJ Collins =

Australian rugby league footballer

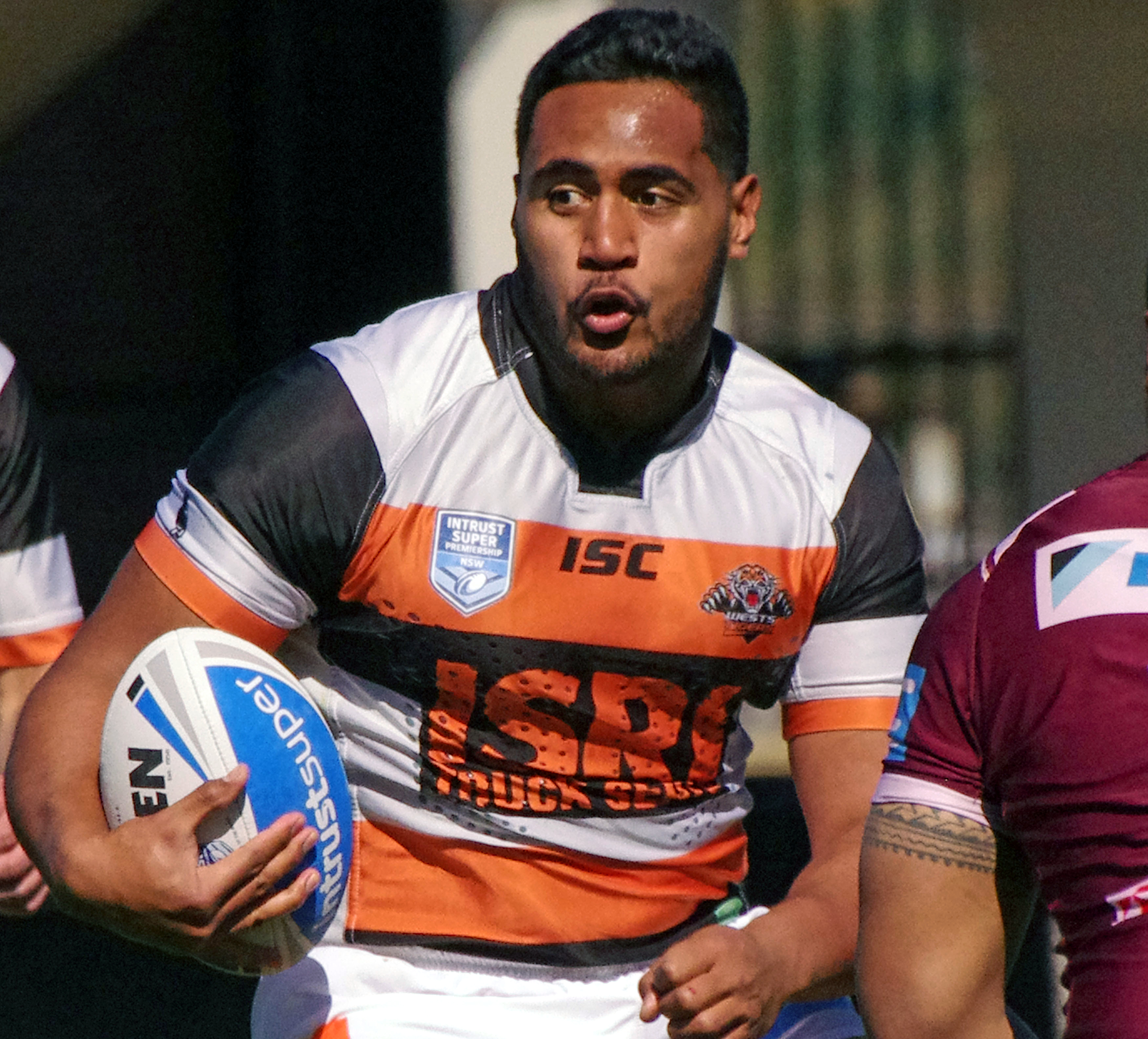
- Collins (né Felise) in 2016

Personal information
- Full name: JJ Collins
- Born: Jacob Junior Felise; 15 February 1996 (age 30) Logan City, Queensland, Australia
- Height: 184 cm (6 ft 0 in)
- Weight: 105 kg (16 st 7 lb)

Playing information
- Position: Prop
Club
Years	Team	Pld	T	G	FG	P
2016–17	Wests Tigers	13	0	0	0	0
2018	Newcastle Knights	2	0	0	0	0
2019	Canberra Raiders	1	0	0	0	0
2023	Dolphins	3	0	0	0	0
	Total	19	0	0	0	0
Representative
Years	Team	Pld	T	G	FG	P
2018	NSW Residents	1	0	0	0	0
- Source: As of 10 January 2024

JJ Collins né Felise (born 15 February 1996) is an Australian professional rugby league footballer who last played for the Dolphins as a prop in the National Rugby League (NRL).

He previously played for the Canberra Raiders, the Newcastle Knights and the Wests Tigers in the NRL. More recently, Collins has played regional rugby league in the Queensland Hostplus Cup for the Tweed Heads Seagulls and the Central Queensland Capras, a feeder club for the Dolphins NRL team.

== Background ==
Collins was born in Logan City, Queensland, Australia, of Samoan descent. He was formerly known as Jacob Junior Felise and JJ Felise, before changing his name to JJ Collins.

Collins played his junior rugby league for the Logan Brothers and attended Keebra Park State High School, before signing with the Wests Tigers as a teenager.

== Playing career ==
=== Early career (2013–2014) ===
While attending Keebra Park High School, Collins was a member of their 2013 ARL Schoolboy Cup winning side. He also represented the Queensland Schoolboys in 2013 and 2014.

=== Wests Tigers (2015–2017) ===
In 2015 and 2016, Collins played for the Wests Tigers' NYC team, including twenty-one games in 2015.

In January 2016, he was named in the Queensland Academy of Sport under-20s squad.

In round 7 of the 2016 NRL season, Collins made his NRL debut for the Tigers against the Melbourne Storm. Coach Jason Taylor said his debut was, "was a tough game that went into extra time and he just didn’t look out of place for a second, which when you stop and think about it, is an incredible thing for a prop on debut against that pack." On 1 June, he re-signed with the Tigers on a two-year contract until the end of 2018. He played in 8 games for the season, all from the interchange bench.

In the 2017 NRL season and suffering some recurring injuries, Collins only made five NRL appearances for the season and did a lengthy stint in reserve grade.

=== Newcastle Knights (2018) ===
Ahead of round 16 of the 2018 season, Collins joined the Newcastle Knights effective immediately after not being able to break into the Tigers' NRL side all season. After spending some time in the Newcastle reserve-grade side, he made his club debut in round 21 against his former team, the Wests Tigers. Collins subsequently played one more NRL match for Newcastle.

=== Canberra Raiders (2019) ===
In round 6 of the 2019 NRL season, Collins made his club debut for the Canberra Raiders in their 26–22 win against the Brisbane Broncos at GIO Stadium.

=== Hostplus Cup (2021–2022) ===
In 2021 and 2022, Collins played thirty-nine games and scored four tries for the Tweed Heads Seagulls in the Hostplus Cup, Queensland's regional competition.

In May 2022, he signed a contract to join the newly licensed Dolphins side ahead of the 2023 NRL season.

=== Dolphins (2023) ===
Collins commenced 2023 playing four games in the Hostplus Cup for the Central Queensland Capras, a feeder club for the Dolphins NRL team. In round 7 of the 2023 NRL season, Collins made his club debut as an interchange for the Dolphins in their 14–36 loss to the South Sydney Rabbitohs at Suncorp Stadium. At the end of the season, Collins' departure from the club was announced.
