= Ben Trbojevic =

Australian rugby league footballer

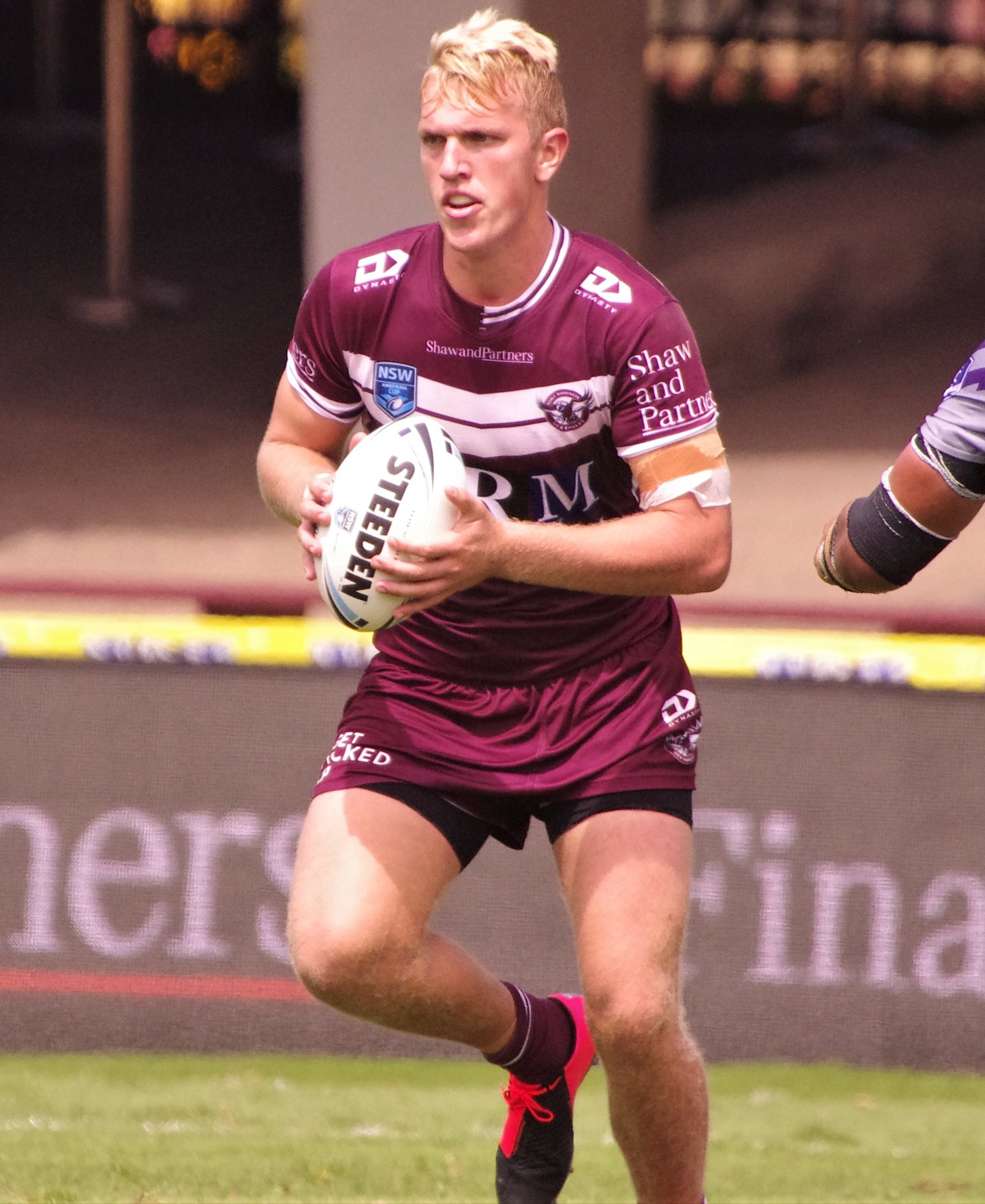

Personal information
- Full name: Ben Trbojević
- Born: 1 August 2001 (age 25) Sydney, New South Wales, Australia
- Height: 193 cm (6 ft 4 in)
- Weight: 105 kg (16 st 7 lb)

Playing information
- Position: Second-row, Centre
Club
Years	Team	Pld	T	G	FG	P
2021–	Manly Sea Eagles	90	20	0	0	80
- Source: As of 5 September 2026
- Spouse: Jade Hodges
- Relatives: Jake Trbojevic (brother); Tom Trbojevic (brother)

Ben Trbojevic (born 1 August 2001), also nicknamed "Burbo", is an Australian professional rugby league footballer who plays as a centre or second-row forward for the Manly-Warringah Sea Eagles in the National Rugby League (NRL).

== Background ==
He is the younger brother of fellow Sea Eagles Jake Trbojevic and Tom Trbojevic. Trbojevic has stated that he sees his older brothers as role models. He is of Serbian descent. He has another brother, Luke, who does not play for the NRL.

== Playing career ==
=== 2021 ===
In Round 12 of the 2021 NRL season, Trbojevic made his debut for Manly-Warringah against Newcastle.

=== 2022 ===
In Round 9 of the 2022 NRL season, Trbojevic scored two tries, a try assist, two line breaks and a line break assist in Manly's win over the Wests Tigers.

=== 2023 ===
In round 12 of the 2023 NRL season, the MSE made an announcement in May that Trbojevic would be out of play for an extended period of time following a hamstring injury during a game. He played 12 matches for Manly in the 2023 NRL season as the club finished 12th on the table and missed the finals.

=== 2024 ===
He played 21 matches for Manly in the 2024 NRL season as they finished 7th on the table and qualified for the finals. Manly would be eliminated in the second week of the finals by the Sydney Roosters.

=== 2025 ===
Trbojevic played 22 games for Manly in the 2025 NRL season as the club finished 10th on the table.

=== 2026 ===
Trbojevic played 21 matches for Manly in the 2026 NRL season as the club finished 9th on the table.

== Statistics ==
Year	Team	Games	Tries	Pts
2021	Manly Warringah Sea Eagles	4		
2022	Manly Warringah Sea Eagles	10	2	8
2023	Manly Warringah Sea Eagles	12	2	8
2024	Manly Warringah Sea Eagles	21	6	24
2025	Manly Warringah Sea Eagles	21	5	20
2026	Manly Warringah Sea Eagles	21	5	20
	Totals	90	20	80
