= Jake Trbojevic =

Australia international rugby league footballer

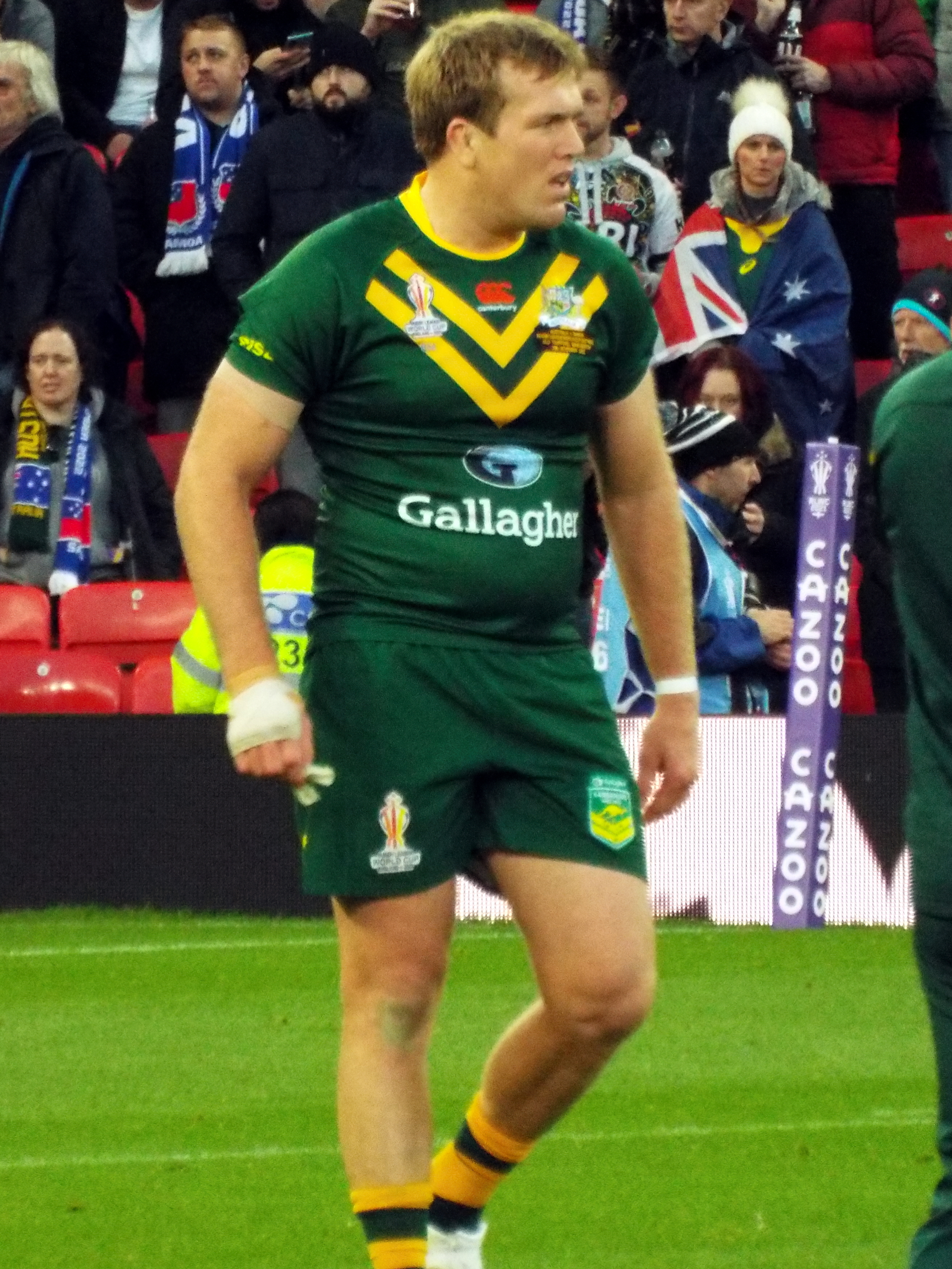

Personal information
- Full name: Jake Trbojević
- Born: 18 February 1994 (age 32) Mona Vale, New South Wales, Australia
- Height: 185 cm (6 ft 1 in)
- Weight: 107 kg (16 st 12 lb)

Playing information
- Position: Lock, Prop
Club
Years	Team	Pld	T	G	FG	P
2013–	Manly Sea Eagles	265	35	0	0	140
Representative
Years	Team	Pld	T	G	FG	P
2016–23	Australia	13	2	0	0	8
2017–24	New South Wales	19	1	0	0	4
- Source: As of 5 September 2026
- Relatives: Ben Trbojevic (brother); Tom Trbojevic (brother)

Jake Trbojevic (born 18 February 1994), commonly nicknamed "Jurbo", (Note: Trbojevic's brother Tom Trbojevic is known as Turbo due to their surname; Jurbo is simply a swapping of the first letter to distinguish the two.) is an Australian professional rugby league footballer who plays as a lock or prop for the Manly Warringah Sea Eagles in the National Rugby League (NRL).

Trbojevic has captained New South Wales in the State of Origin series and played for Australia at international level, winning the 2022 Rugby League World Cup.

== Background ==
Trbojevic was born in Mona Vale on Sydney's Northern Beaches. Trbojevic is the older brother of fellow Manly Warringah Sea Eagles Tom Trbojevic and Ben Trbojevic.

Trbojevic played his junior rugby league for Mona Vale Raiders in the Mona Vale rugby league, before being signed by the Manly Warringah Sea Eagles. During his time at the Mona Vale Raiders Rugby League club, he was coached by Steve Wilson.

Trbojevic has played for the New South Wales U16's and U18's teams. In October 2011, Trbojevic played for the Australian Schoolboys. On 7 March 2012, Trbojevic re-signed with the Sea Eagles on a 2-year contract. Trbojevic played for the Sea Eagles NYC team in 2013. On 20 April 2013, Trbojevic was named in the New South Wales Under 20s team against the Queensland Under 20s team, Trbojevic played off the interchange bench in the 36–12 victory at Penrith Stadium. On 27 August 2013, Trbojevic was named at prop in the 2013 NYC Team of the Year. On 13 October 2013, Trbojevic played for the Junior Kangaroos against the Junior Kiwis off the interchange bench in the Kangaroos 38–26 win at Jubilee Oval.

== Playing career ==
=== 2013 ===
In round 26 of the 2013 NRL season, Trbojevic made his NRL debut for the Manly Warringah Sea Eagles against the Penrith Panthers off the interchange bench in Manly's 38–26 loss at Brookvale Oval. Trbojevic only played 1 match for the Manly Warringah Sea Eagles in the 2013 NRL season.

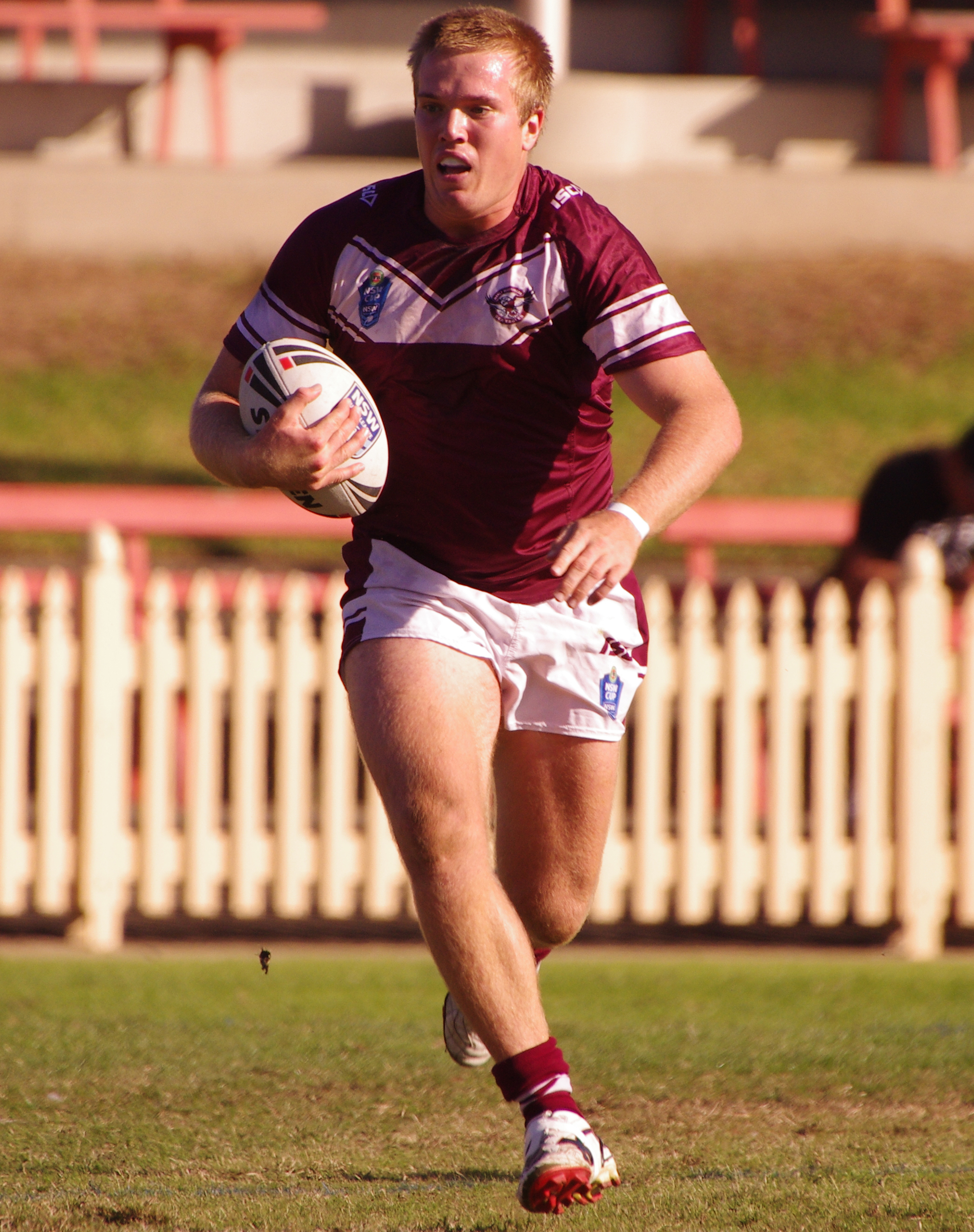
Trbojevic playing for the Sea Eagles in the NSW Cup in 2014

=== 2014 ===
Trbojevic played no matches for the Sea Eagles in the 2014 NRL season after suffering a broken leg and dislocated ankle in a NSW Cup match.

=== 2015 ===
In round 2 of the 2015 NRL season, Trbojevic played his first grade match for the Sea Eagles since round 26 in the 2013 NRL season, playing against the Melbourne Storm off the interchange in the club's 24–22 win at Brookvale Oval. On 28 April 2015 Trbojevic re-signed with the Sea Eagles on a 2-year contract. In Round 20 against the New Zealand Warriors, Trbojevic scored his first NRL career try in the club's 32–12 win at Mt Smart Stadium. On 8 September, Trbojevic's form for Manly, which finished the season in 9th place with an 11–13 record (missing the finals for the first time since 2004) saw him win the clubs "Roy Bull Best & Fairest" award for the year. He played 23 games for Manly in 2015, scoring 3 tries, making 601 tackles, 2,559 metres and 247 hit ups. On 26 September, Trbojevic earned his first senior representative jumper when he played at prop for the Prime Minister's XIII against Papua New Guinea in the 40–12 win in Port Moresby.

=== 2016 ===
On 1 February, Trbojevic was named as captain of the Sea Eagles' 2016 NRL Auckland Nines squad.

After again playing for the Prime Ministers XIII, on 13 October 2016, Trbojevic was called into the Australian Kangaroos squad for the 2016 Rugby League Four Nations tournament after Canberra Raiders forward Josh Papalii withdrew with an ankle injury. He made his test debut playing lock forward for Australia in the opening match of the Four Nations tournament against Scotland in Hull, England on 28 October and scored a try on debut. By playing in the match, he became Manly-Warringah's 68th Australian test player and the first local Manly junior to make his test debut for Australia since Anthony Watmough in the 2008 Rugby League World Cup.

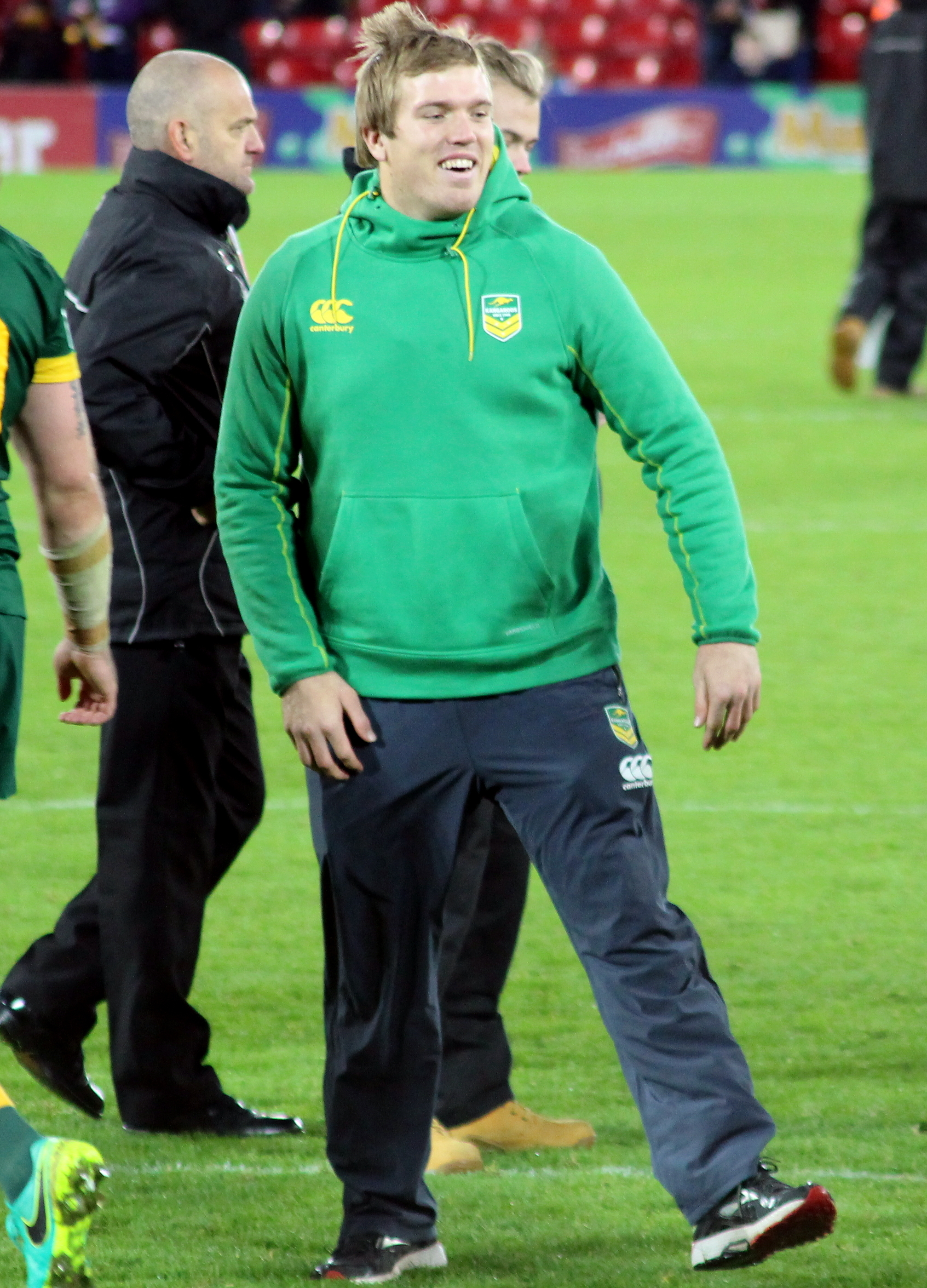
Trbojevic post match after the 2016 Four Nations Final

=== 2017 ===
Manly coach Trent Barrett named Jake Trbojevic as vice-captain of Manly-Warringah for the 2017 NRL season with Daly Cherry-Evans named as captain, the pair taking over from retired captain Jamie Lyon and vice-captain Brett Stewart. Trbojevic finished the year with 23 games and 9 tries. At the end of the year, Trbojevic was selected in the 24 man squad to play for Australia with his younger brother Tom Trbojevic. He was injured in the first game of the World Cup and did not play for the rest of the tournament.

=== 2018 ===
Trbojevic played all three games for the New South Wales Blues on the Bench. He was a shining light (alongside his younger brother and star fullback Tom Trbojevic) in an otherwise rocky season at the Manly-Warringah Sea Eagles. At the year's end, Trbojevic was selected to play in the Prime Minister's XIII which they went on to win 18 – 34.

=== 2019 ===
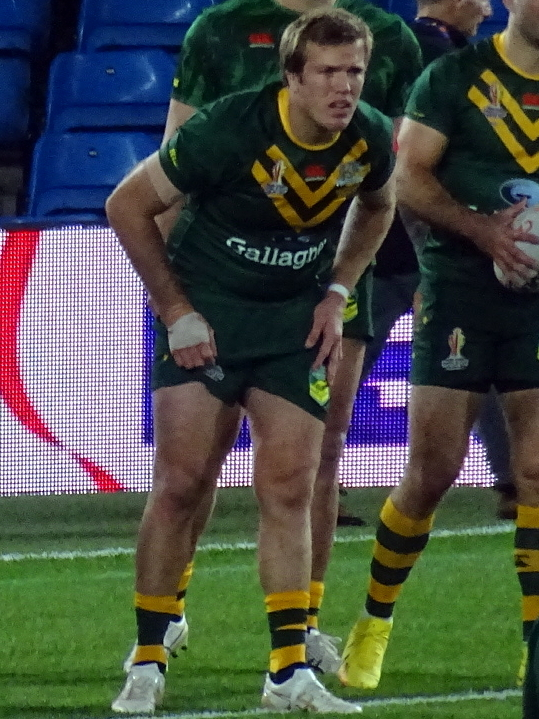
Trbojevic with the Kangaroos in 2022

Trbojevic was selected by New South Wales to play in the 2019 State of Origin series after a good start to the season. Trbojevic played in all 3 matches as New South Wales won the series 2–1. It was the first time since 2005 that New South Wales had won back-to-back series.

Trbojevic made 25 appearances for Manly in the 2019 NRL season as the club qualified for the finals after finishing in sixth place. Trbojevic played in the club's elimination final victory over Cronulla and also featured in Manly's elimination final loss against South Sydney where he was controversially sent to the sin bin for allegedly pushing a Souths player in the second half of the match.

On 30 September, Trbojevic was named at lock for the Australia PM XIII side. On 7 October, Trbojevic was named in the Australian side for the upcoming Oceania Cup fixtures.

=== 2020 ===
Trbojevic played 20 games for Manly in the 2020 NRL season. The club missed the finals finishing 13th on the table.

Trbojevic was selected by New South Wales for the 2020 State of Origin series. He played in all three games as New South Wales suffered a shock 2–1 series loss against an under strength Queensland side.

=== 2021 ===
On 30 May, he was selected for game one of the 2021 State of Origin series. In round 25 of the 2021 NRL season, he scored two tries for Manly in a 46–18 victory over North Queensland. He played 23 games for Manly in the 2021 NRL season including the club's preliminary final loss against South Sydney.

=== 2022 ===
Trbojevic was selected for games two and three of the 2022 State of Origin series which saw New South Wales lose the series 2–1.

Trbojevic played 20 games for Manly in the 2022 NRL season as the club finished 11th.

In October, Trbojevic was named in the Australia squad for the 2021 Rugby League World Cup.

He was part of the Australian side which won their 12th World Cup defeating Samoa 30–10 in the 2021 Rugby League World Cup final.

=== 2023 ===
Trbojevic was selected by New South Wales for game 3 of the 2023 State of Origin series which the blues won 24-10 and avoided a series whitewash. Trbojevic played 18 matches for Manly in the 2023 NRL season as the club finished 12th on the table and missed the finals.

=== 2024 ===
On 26 May, Trbojevic was named as the new captain for New South Wales ahead of the 2024 State of Origin series. Trbojevic played in all three games of the series as New South Wales won 2–1 to reclaim the shield for the first time since 2021. He played 24 games with Manly in the 2024 NRL season as they finished 7th on the table and qualified for the finals. Manly would be eliminated in the second week of the finals by the Sydney Roosters.

=== 2025 ===
Trbojevic played 17 games for Manly in the 2025 NRL season as the club finished 10th on the table, missing the finals.

=== 2026 ===
On 9 May, Trbojevic has celebrated his 250th first grade game at Manly. On 20 May, Manly confirmed that Trbojevic had extended his contract until the end of 2027. On 12 June, Manly confirmed that Trbojevic appointed as co-captain alongside his brother, Tom, who will return during round 16 against the Canterbury-Bankstown Bulldogs. Trbojevic played 24 matches for Manly in the 2026 NRL season as the club finished 9th on the table.

== Statistics ==
Year	Team	Games	Tries	Pts
2013	Manly Warringah Sea Eagles	1		
2015	Manly Warringah Sea Eagles	23	3	12
2016	Manly Warringah Sea Eagles	23	4	16
2017	Manly Warringah Sea Eagles	24	9	36
2018	Manly Warringah Sea Eagles	23	7	28
2019	Manly Warringah Sea Eagles	25	2	8
2020	Manly Warringah Sea Eagles	20	2	8
2021	Manly Warringah Sea Eagles	23	3	12
2022	Manly Warringah Sea Eagles	20	1	4
2023	Manly Warringah Sea Eagles	18	1	4
2024	Manly Warringah Sea Eagles	24	2	8
2025	Manly Warringah Sea Eagles	17		
2026	Manly Warringah Sea Eagles	9	1	4
	Totals	250	35	140
