= 2019 World Club Challenge =

Intercontinental rugby league match

2019 Betfred World Club Challenge
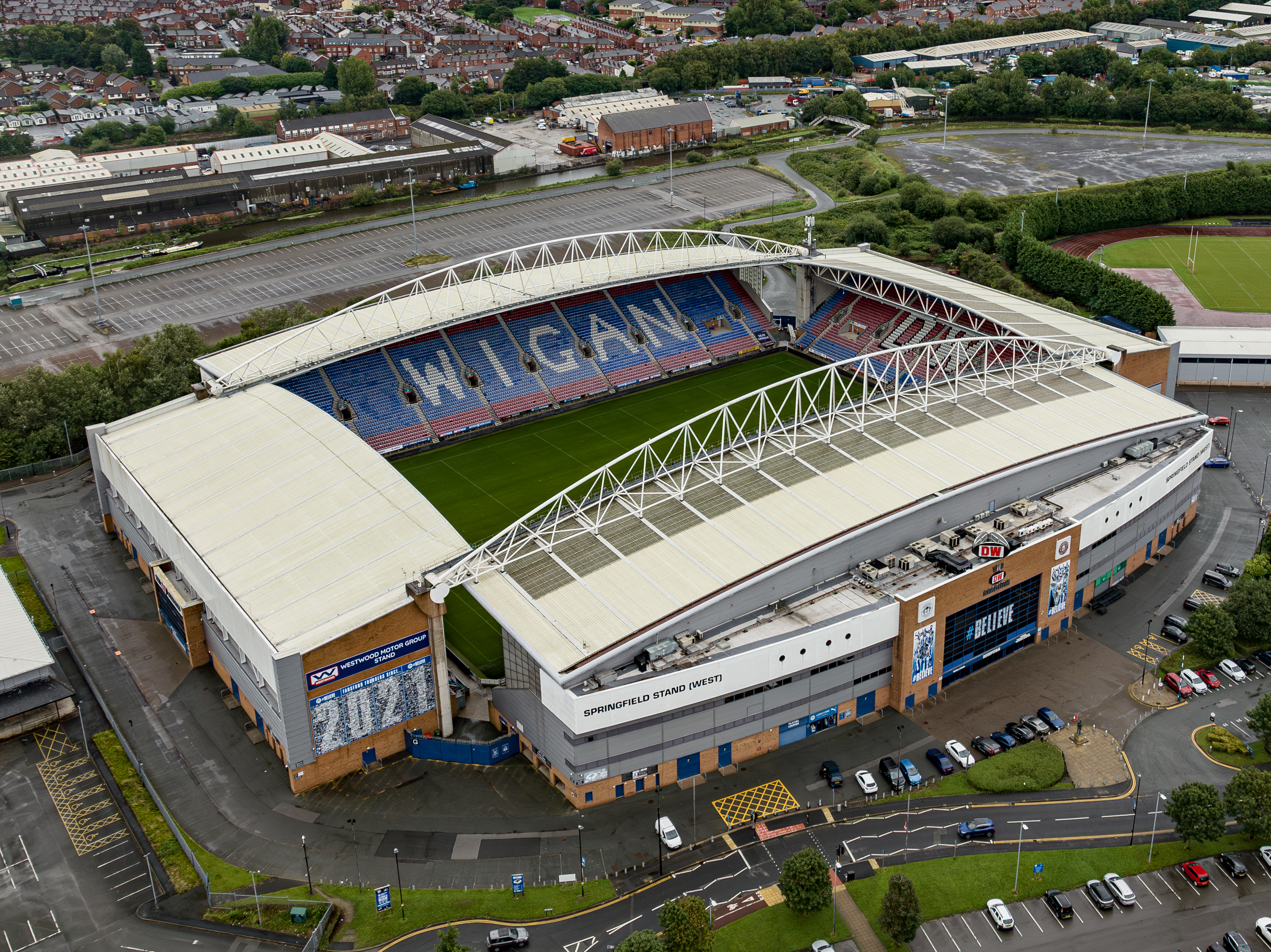
- The DW Stadium hosted the match
| Wigan Warriors | Sydney Roosters |
|---|---|
| (Super League) | (NRL) |
| 8 | 20 |
| | 1 | 2 | Total |
|---|---|---|---|
| WIG | 4 | 4 | 8 |
| SYD | 14 | 6 | 20 |
- Date: 17 February 2019
- Stadium: DW Stadium
- Location: Wigan, United Kingdom
- Man of the Match: Brett Morris
- Referee: Robert Hicks
- Attendance: 21,331

Broadcast partners
- Broadcasters: (Australia) Nine Network; (United Kingdom) Sky Sports; (New Zealand) Māori Television

The 2019 Betfred World Club Challenge was the 27th staging of the World Club Challenge. It was played on 17 February 2019, and featured Super League champions Wigan Warriors, and NRL winners Sydney Roosters.

This was the second time these two teams had met in the World Club Challenge, with Sydney claiming a 36–14 victory in 2014. Wigan were aiming to extend their record winning total to five wins, whilst Sydney were aiming to equal Wigan's record with their fourth win, as well as keeping their 100% record in the World Club Challenge intact.

Sydney won the match 20–8, thus equalling Wigan's record of 4 wins, and maintaining their 100% record of never losing a world club challenge.

== Background ==
=== Wigan Warriors ===
After becoming the first team to win every game in the Super 8s, Wigan finished Super League XXIII's regular season in 2nd place. They went on to beat Castleford Tigers 14–0 in the semi-final, and defeated 4th-placed Warrington Wolves, 12–4, in the Grand Final.

=== Sydney Roosters ===
The Roosters finished the 2018 NRL season in 1st place and won the minor premiership. They then went undefeated through the finals series to claim the 2018 Premiership with a 21–6 win in the 2018 NRL Grand Final over the Melbourne Storm.

== Teams ==
2019 Betfred World Club Challenge Teams
| Wigan Warriors | Position | Sydney Roosters |
|---|---|---|
| 20. Zak Hardaker | Fullback | 1. James Tedesco |
| 2. Tom Davies | Wing | 2. Daniel Tupou |
| 4. Oliver Gildart | Centre | 4. Joseph Manu |
| 3. Dan Sarginson | Centre | 5. Brett Morris |
| 17. Liam Marshall | Wing | 20. Matt Ikuvalu |
| 6. George Williams | Stand-off/Five-eighth | 6. Luke Keary |
| 7. Thomas Leuluai | Scrum-half/Halfback | 7. Cooper Cronk |
| 8. Tony Clubb | Prop | 8. Jared Waerea-Hargreaves |
| 9. Sam Powell | Hooker | 9. Jake Friend |
| 10. Ben Flower | Prop | 10. Siosiua Taukeiaho |
| 11. Joe Greenwood | Second-row | 11. Boyd Cordner (c) |
| 12. Liam Farrell | Second-row | 3. Mitchell Aubusson |
| 13. Sean O'Loughlin (c) | Loose forward/Lock | 13. Victor Radley |
| 14. Romain Navarrete | Interchange | 14. Isaac Liu |
| 15. Willie Isa | Interchange | 15. Zane Tetevano |
| 16. Gabe Hamlin | Interchange | 16. Lindsay Collins |
| 22. Joe Bullock | Interchange | 17. Nat Butcher |
| Adrian Lam | Coach | Trent Robinson |

== Match details ==
17 February

| Wigan Warriors | 8 – 20 | Sydney Roosters |
|---|---|---|
| Tries: Tom Davies (20') 1 Liam Marshall (65') 1 Goals: Zak Hardaker 0/2 | 1st: 4 – 14; 2nd: 4 – 6 | Tries: 3 (4', 9', 32') Brett Morris; 1 (77') Daniel Tupou; Goals: 2/4 Sio Siua Taukeiaho (10', 61' pen); 0/1 James Tedesco |

DW Stadium, Wigan
Attendance: 21,331
Referee: Robert Hicks
Player of the Match: Brett Morris
