= World Club Championship =

World Club Championship may refer to:

- FIFA Club World Cup - FIFA football competition.
  - Intercontinental Cup - The unofficial predecessor to the FIFA Club World Cup.
  - FIFA Intercontinental Cup - A global FIFA football competition from 2024 using the FIFA Club World Cup's 2005 to 2023 format.
- FIBA Intercontinental Cup - an international basketball championship for clubs.
- World Club Challenge - Rugby League football competition.
