= 2014 World Club Challenge =

Rugby league competition

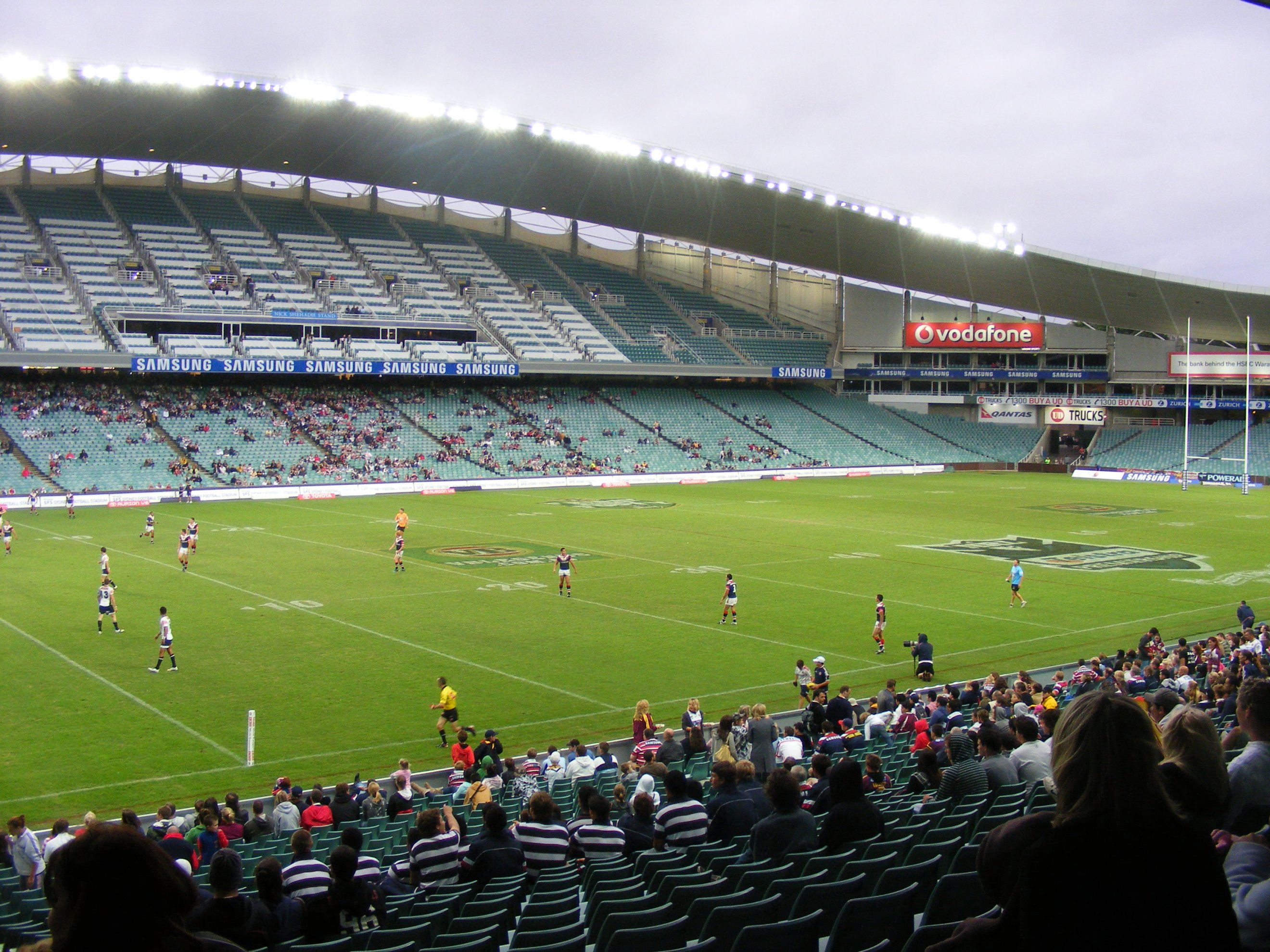
- The Sydney Football Stadium hosted the match
Sydney Roosters	Wigan Warriors
(NRL)	(SL)
36	14
	1	2	Total
SYD	18	18	36
WIG	0	14	14
- Date: 22 February 2014
- Stadium: Sydney Football Stadium
- Location: Sydney, Australia
- Man of the Match: Jake Friend
- Referee: Ben Cummins (Australia); Gerard Sutton (Australia)
- Attendance: 31,515

Broadcast partners
- Broadcasters: (Australia) Nine Network; (United Kingdom) Sky Sports; (New Zealand) Māori Television

The 2014 World Club Challenge was the 15th consecutive annual (and 22nd overall) World Club Challenge and was contested by Super League XVIII champions, Wigan Warriors and 2013 NRL Premiers, the Sydney Roosters. The 2014 World Club Challenge marked a return to Australia, 20 years after the last Australian based game. It was played on 22 February 2014 at Allianz Stadium in Sydney. The Roosters won the match 36–14.

By winning the World Club Challenge, the Roosters were the only team to win on Australian soil, but are the only team to have won twice. In 1976, Eastern Suburbs, the 1975 NSWRFL Premiers, defeated the 1975–76 English champions St. Helens 25–2 in front of 26,865 at the Sydney Cricket Ground.

== Background ==
This game marked the first time that these two clubs have played each other. It was the third final for Sydney and the sixth final for Wigan and was the first time in 20 years that it has been staged in Australia. The last World Club Challenge staged in Australia was in 1994 and coincidentally, also featured Wigan. In 1994, Wigan defeated the Brisbane Broncos 20–14 in front of what is still the WCC record attendance of 54,220 at Brisbane's ANZ Stadium.

After the 2013 Rugby League World Cup had been staged in England, it was agreed to transfer this game to Australia. The Sydney Roosters had as many as 16 players who had already travelled across to England for the Rugby League World Cup.

=== Sydney Roosters ===
The Roosters finished the 2013 NRL season in 1st place to claim the minor premiership and on 6 October 2013 defeated the 4th-placed Manly-Warringah Sea Eagles 26 - 18 in the 2013 NRL Grand final, qualifying Sydney for their third World Club Challenge, and first since 2003. Tony Smith, the coach of Wigan's 2013 Grand final opponents, Warrington Wolves, flew to sydney to assist the Roosters in their preparation for the World Club Challenge.

=== Wigan Warriors ===
Wigan finished Super League XVIII's regular season in 4th place and on 5 October 2013 defeated 2nd-placed Warrington Wolves 30 - 16 in the 2013 Super League Grand final, qualifying the Warriors for their sixth World Club Challenge overall.

Having already played their first game of the 2014 Super League season, Wigan traveled down under. They prepared for the World Club Challenge with a match in Hamilton, New Zealand against a New Zealand Warriors side which was heavily depleted due to the upcoming Auckland Nines tournament. Wigan won the match at Waikato Stadium 46–22.

== Teams ==
2014 World Club Challenge Teams
Sydney Roosters	Posit.	Wigan Warriors
1. Anthony Minichiello (c)	Fullback	1. Matthew Bowen
2. Daniel Tupou	Winger	2. Josh Charnley
3. Michael Jennings	Centre	3. Darrell Goulding
4. Mitchell Aubusson	Centre	23. Dan Sarginson
5. Shaun Kenny-Dowall	Winger	32. Joe Burgess
6. James Maloney	Five-eighth	6. Blake Green
7. Mitchell Pearce	Halfback	7. Matty Smith
8. Jared Waerea-Hargreaves	Prop	16. Gil Dudson
9. Jake Friend	Hooker	9. Michael McIlorum
10. Sam Moa	Prop	10. Ben Flower
11. Boyd Cordner	2nd Row	14. Jack Hughes
12. Sonny Bill Williams	2nd Row	12. Liam Farrell
13. Frank-Paul Nu'uausala	Lock	13. Sean O'Loughlin (c)
14. Daniel Mortimer	Interchange	8. Scott Taylor
15. Aidan Guerra	Interchange	17. Dom Crosby
16. Dylan Napa	Interchange	22. Eddy Pettybourne
17. Rémi Casty	Interchange	25. John Bateman
Trent Robinson	Coach	Shaun Wane

== Match details ==
22 February 2014
8:00pm (Local)

Sydney Roosters	36 – 14	Wigan Warriors
Tries: Michael Jennings (4', 22', 49'); Sam Moa (13'); Jared Waerea-Hargreaves (67'); Shaun Kenny-Dowall (72'); Goals: James Maloney (6/6)	(Report)	Tries: Joe Burgess (44'); Josh Charnley (52', 59') Goals: Matty Smith (1/3)

Allianz Stadium, Sydney
Attendance: 31,515
Referee: Ben Cummins (Australia)
Gerard Sutton (Australia)
Player of the Match: Jake Friend
