= Jake Friend =

Australia international rugby league footballer

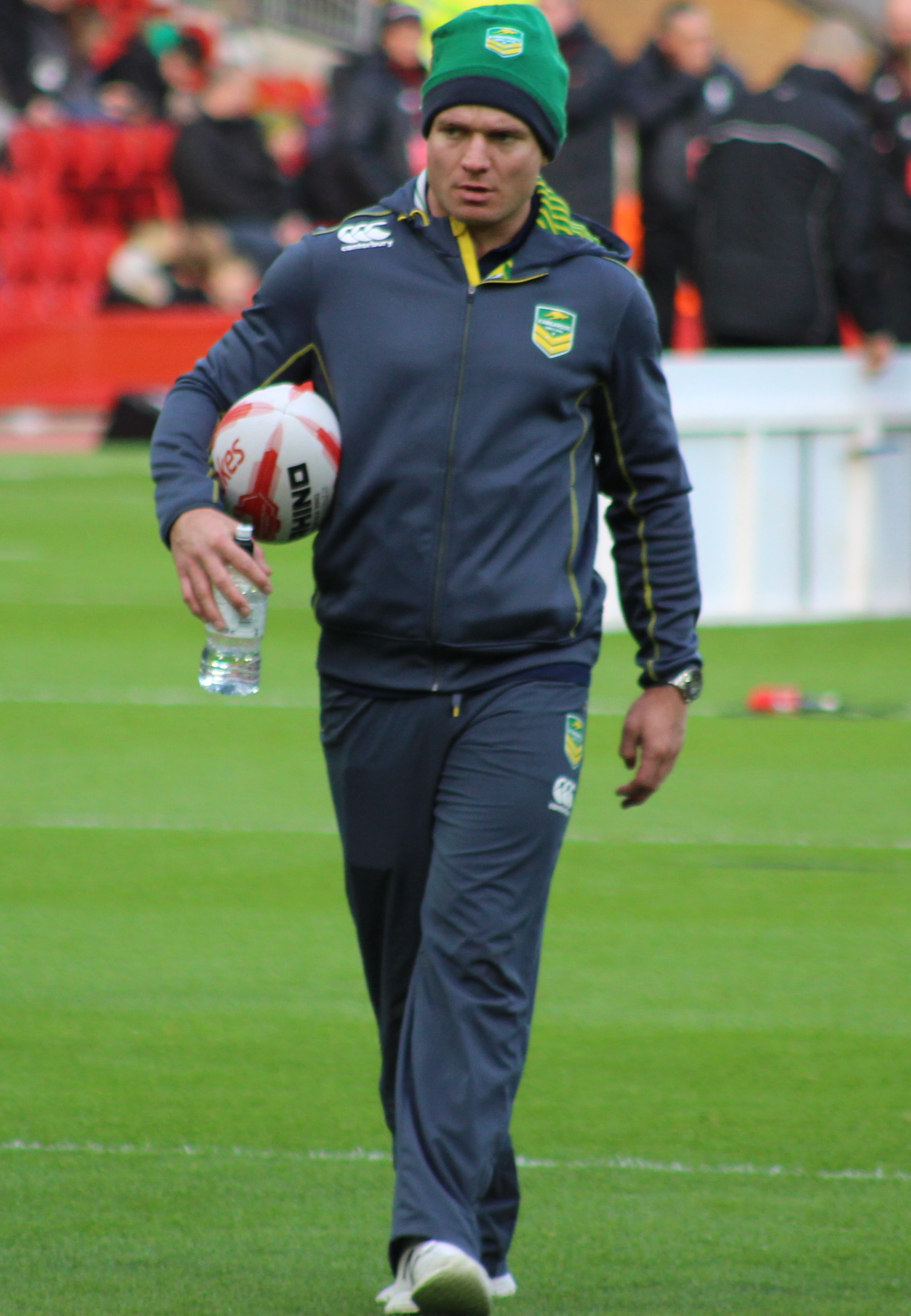

Personal information
- Full name: Jake Friend
- Born: 4 February 1990 (age 36) Nambour, Queensland, Australia
- Height: 175 cm (5 ft 9 in)
- Weight: 92 kg (14 st 7 lb)

Playing information
- Position: Hooker
Club
Years	Team	Pld	T	G	FG	P
2008–21	Sydney Roosters	264	27	0	1	109
Representative
Years	Team	Pld	T	G	FG	P
2011–16	Prime Minister's XIII	2	0	0	0	0
2016	Australia	1	0	0	0	0
2017	World All Stars	1	0	0	0	0
2020	Queensland	3	0	0	0	0
- Source: As of 8 April 2021

Jake Friend (born 4 February 1990) is an Australian former rugby league footballer who played as a hooker. He spent his entire first-grade career, spanning 2008 to 2021, with the Sydney Roosters in the National Rugby League (NRL); at the time of his retirement, he was the club's co-captain. Friend won three premierships with the Roosters, in 2013, 2018 and 2019. Internationally, Friend represented Australia in a Test in 2016.

Friend also represented the Prime Minister's XIII, World All Stars and Queensland. With the latter, he won the 2020 State of Origin series, playing in all three games, in what would be the final full season of his playing career.

== Background ==
Friend was born in Nambour, Queensland, Australia.

== Junior career ==
The Noosa Pirates junior joined the Roosters on a scholarship when he was 15 and, in 2008, progressed from SG Ball through to Toyota Cup to the NRL in just four months.

== First grade career ==
Friend made his first grade debut for the Sydney Roosters against Canterbury-Bankstown in round 16 of the 2008 NRL season. In the 2009 NRL season, Friend played 21 games for the club as they finished last on the table for the first time since 1966.

Friend finished the 2010 NRL season as the Roosters starting hooker in the 2010 NRL Grand Final. However, the Roosters were defeated 32-8 by the St George Illawarra Dragons at Sydney Olympic Stadium.

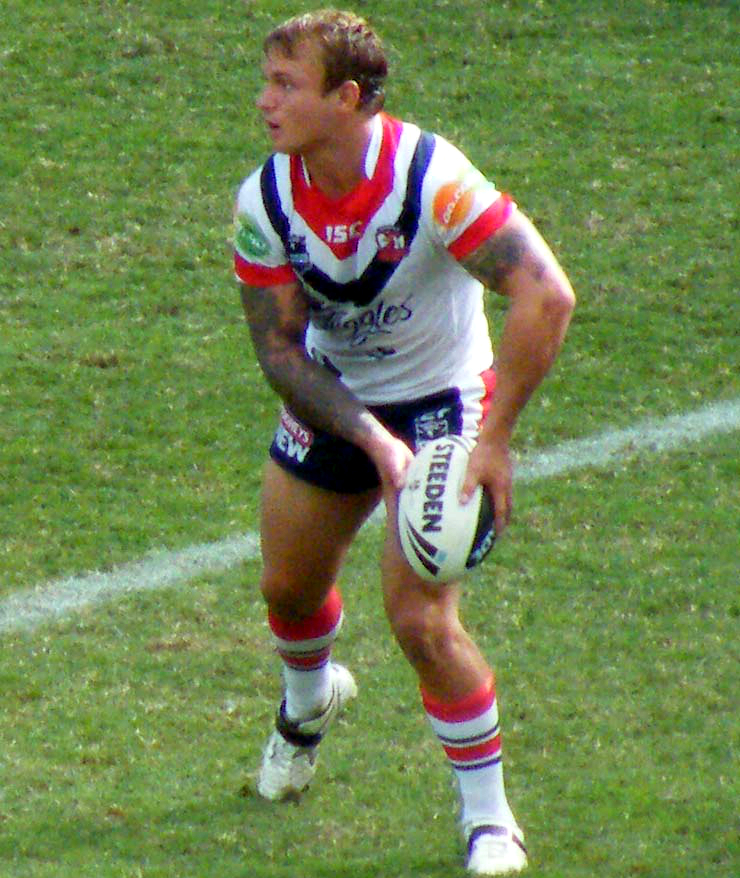
Friend playing for the Roosters

Friend's good form continued in 2011 and despite a lacklustre year by the team, he was awarded the club's highest individual honour, the Jack Gibson Medal, after a season of consistent performances.

2013 was a true breakout season for Friend. He maintained a high work rate in defence with an average of 37 tackles a game. He played for the Roosters in their 2013 NRL Grand Final win over Manly-Warringah at ANZ Stadium.

He continued his form in 2014, which started with a starring role for the Sydney Roosters in the 2014 World Club Challenge at hooker, where he was named man of the match in the Australian premiers' 36-14 World Champion victory over Wigan in Sydney. He also won the Ashton Collier medal for Man of the Match in the 2014 ANZAC Game between the Sydney Roosters and St George Illawarra Dragons.

Friend was part of the Eastern Suburbs sides which made preliminary final appearances in 2015 and 2017 but fell short of a grand final appearance on both occasions. In 2018, Friend was part of the side which won their 4th minor premiership in 6 seasons. On 30 September 2018, Friend co-captained Easts in the 2018 NRL Grand Final victory over Melbourne.

At the start of the 2019 NRL season, Friend scored a try for the Sydney Roosters in the club's round 1 defeat against arch rivals South Sydney at the Sydney Cricket Ground. In round 3, Friend was taken from the field with a shoulder injury in the club's 32–18 win over Parramatta at ANZ Stadium. Friend returned to the Easts team for the ANZAC Day match against St George but suffered a torn right bicep and was ruled out for 10 weeks. Friend returned to the Easts side in Round 17 against North Queensland at the Central Coast Stadium. Friend scored a try in a 15–12 defeat. The following week against Newcastle, Friend was taken from the field during the club's 48–10 victory at the Sydney Cricket Ground with a fracture to his forearm. Subsequent scans revealed that Friend was ruled out for 8 weeks.

Friend made only 6 appearances for the Sydney Roosters in the 2019 NRL season as the club reached the 2019 NRL Grand Final against Canberra. Friend was a late inclusion for the grand final team after coach Trent Robinson decided to replace Zane Tetevano with Friend. The Sydney Roosters would go on to win the final 14-8 and claim their second consecutive premiership. The premiership victory was Friend's third as a player.

On 22 February 2020, Friend played for the Sydney Roosters in their 2020 World Club Challenge victory defeating St Helens R.F.C. 20–12.

Friend played 19 games for the Sydney Roosters in the 2020 NRL season. The club fell short of a third successive premiership losing to Canberra in the elimination final.

On 4 November 2020, Friend made his debut for Queensland in Game 1 of the 2020 State of Origin series as they won 18–14 in an upset victory at Adelaide Oval. Friend went on to start in Games 2 and 3. The Maroons won the series 2–1.

On 8 April 2021, Friend announced his immediate retirement from Rugby League due to repeated head knocks, having suffered from an estimated 20 concussions throughout his career.

== Post playing ==
In 2022, Friend became a coach for the Roosters pathway team alongside former teammate Mitchell Aubusson. On 24 February 2023, Friend was inducted a life member of the Roosters club.

== Representative career ==
In 2016, he was selected in Australia's 2016 Four Nations squad as a back-up hooker for captain; Cameron Smith. Friend made his international debut against Scotland off the interchange bench.

== Achievements ==
- NRL Grand Final winner (2013)
- NRL Grand Final winning Co-Captain (with Boyd Cordner) (2018,2019)
- NRL Minor Premiership (2013)
- NRL Minor Premiership (2014)
- NRL Minor Premiership (2015)
- NRL Minor Premiership (2018)
- World Club Challenge winner (2014)
- World Club Challenge man of the match (2014)
- Ashton Collier medallist (2014)
- NRL Grand Final winner (2018)
- NRL Grand Final winner (2019)
- World Club Challenge winner (2019)
- World Club Challenge winner (2020)
- State of Origin Winner (2020)
- Ron McAuliffe Medalist (2020)
- State of Origin Winner (2020)

== Statistics ==
Year	Team	Games	Tries	FGs	Pts
2008	Sydney Roosters	5			
2009	Sydney Roosters	21	2		8
2010	Sydney Roosters	19	1		4
2011	Sydney Roosters	24	3		12
2012	Sydney Roosters	24	2		8
2013	Sydney Roosters	27	7		28
2014	Sydney Roosters	23	3		12
2015	Sydney Roosters	22	2	1	9
2016	Sydney Roosters	24	1		4
2017	Sydney Roosters	22	3		12
2018	Sydney Roosters	27			
2019	Sydney Roosters	6	2		8
2020	Sydney Roosters	19	1		4
2021	Sydney Roosters	1			
	Totals	264	27	1	109

== Controversy ==
In March 2009, Friend was suspended by the NRL for 2 weeks for high range drink driving offences.

On 27 June 2009, Friend along with Sandor Earl were initially charged with assaulting a woman in Sydney. It was alleged the niece of ABC radio commentator David Morrow 'was punched' at The Tank nightclub in The Rocks. They were quickly cleared of any charges after surveillance video was reviewed.

On 13 December 2009, Friend was arrested and charged by police following an altercation with a taxi driver. As a result, the Roosters terminated his contract. In May 2010, Friend was re-instated in the Roosters team after counselling and rehabilitation.
