= Rugby League Las Vegas =

Annual event

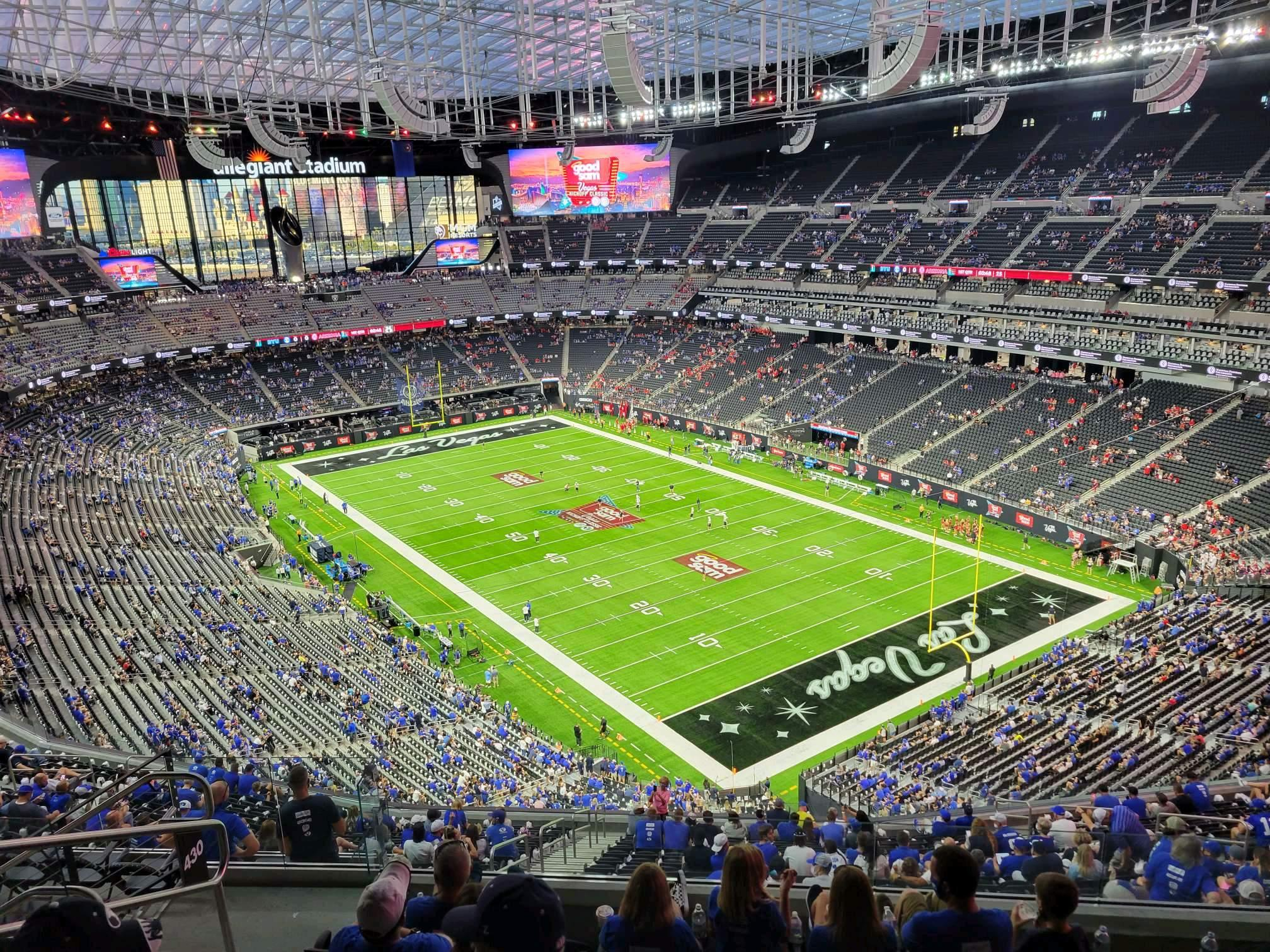
- The Allegiant Stadium hosts the main event
- Status: Active
- Genre: Rugby league
- Frequency: Annually
- Venue: Allegiant Stadium
- Locations: Paradise, Nevada
- Country: United States
- Years active: 2
- Inaugurated: March 2, 2024
- Previous event: March 1, 2025
- Participants: (Australia) National Rugby League; (United Kingdom) Super League
- Attendance: 40,927 (2024); 45,209 (2025); 45,719 (2026)
- Capacity: 65,000
- Organizer: (Australia) National Rugby League

Rugby League Las Vegas is an annual event held primarily at the Allegiant Stadium in Las Vegas showcasing the sport of rugby league. The inaugural event was established in 2023 by Australia's National Rugby League (NRL) to host two matches of the 2024 NRL season opening round, and was done so with the aim of expanding the audience of the competition and develop rugby league in the United States.

The event, initially contracted until 2028, was expanded to include clubs from the United Kingdom's Super League in 2025. The initial joining of Super League clubs was arranged on a club level with the NRL before a formal agreement was arranged for Super League's regular inclusion for future events.

Alongside the professional games, the event also sees United States men's and women's national team games, an open registration nines tournament, as well as various pop up fanzones, media launches, and player meets.

== History ==
=== 2024 event ===
In August 2023, the National Rugby League (NRL) announced that two games in the opening round of the 2024 NRL season would be held in Las Vegas. The Brisbane Broncos, Manly Warringah Sea Eagles, South Sydney Rabbitohs, and Sydney Roosters were selected to play in the event, with the remainder of round one being confirmed at a later date. The two matches took place on March 2, 2024, and marked the first NRL regular season games held outside Australia and New Zealand. The 2024 event saw Manly Warringah beat South Sydney and Sydney beat Brisbane. The NRL initially declared that 40,746 fans attended but the Las Vegas Stadium Authority revealed a figure of 31,927. Both games were aired on Fox Sports in the United States. While stadium attendance was deemed a success, TV viewing fixtures were low in the United States at only 61,000, though it was 16,000 higher than the last NRL programme to be aired in the states. Viewing figures in Australia surpassed 1.6 million across both games. The day prior to the event, a friendly between the national men's teams of the United States and Canada was held. The game ended 16–16.

=== 2025 event ===
In July 2024, the NRL announced that the 2025 event would feature the Canberra Raiders, Cronulla-Sutherland Sharks, Auckland Warriors, and Penrith Panthers. In addition, the 2025 event will also feature a matchweek three game of the United Kingdom's Super League with Wigan Warriors facing local rivals Warrington Wolves. Like the NRL in 2024, this game marks the first regular season Super League game to be held in the United States. Further, the event would also showcase a match between the Australia and England women's national sides. Super League's involvement in the event came after a speculative email was sent to the organizers by Wigan's CEO Kris Radlinski after he watched the 2024 event on TV. In November 2024, Matty Ashton and Kruise Leeming ran promotions for the event at the Las Vegas Raiders vs Denver Broncos NFL game and during the F1 Las Vegas Grand Prix, with both occurring on the same weekend.

Both United States men's and women's national teams faced Greece the day before the 2025 event, with the men's team losing 10–46 and women's team winning 46–0. The men's game was intended to be a two test series, with the first game scheduled for two days prior on 26 February. The game was cancelled after copper cables were stolen from the floodlights leaving them inoperable.

In the weeks ahead of the 2025 event, the Super League fixture was described as "the biggest game in British rugby league history" due to the potential investments, brand recognition, and fan markets it could make available to the British game across the United States, United Kingdom, and Australia. 38,107 were in attendance for the 2025 event, up from the previous year, whom saw Wigan defeat Warrington, Canberra defeat Auckland, Penrith defeat Cronulla-Sutherland, and a record defeat of the England Lionesses by Australia Jillaroos. Analysis following the 2025 event showed that Rugby League Las Vegas is being a short term success with the event being profitable and providing a good showcase of the sport, however it was unclear if the event was having any impact on the long term goal of establishing rugby league in the United States as the vast majority of attendees were travelling Australians, New Zealanders, and Britons. The four-game event proved to be too ambitious, especially with the Allegiant Stadium not allowing re-admission. Crowd numbers had reduced by game four nor had everyone entered the stadium for game one, with Peter V'landys saying the nine-hour event was too long for most attending. The involvement of Super League was deemed as success and a boost to the event by the NRL.

US TV ratings for 2025 were up over 600% on 2024. 371,000 Americans watched the Canberra vs Auckland game in 2025, compared to 61,000 for the top game in the 2024 schedule. In the UK, the Wigan vs Warrington game peaked at 340,000 making it the most watched Super League game outside of the COVID-19 season. It was also the most watched Super League game in Australia.

=== 2026 event ===
On the eve of the 2025 event, it was reported that RL Commercial had secured Super League's place for the 2026 event, marking Super League's formal inclusion in Rugby League Las Vegas after the 2025 game was organised by the participating clubs and not the league itself. The 2026 World Club Challenge was also under consideration for inclusion, with the 2025 match being cancelled due Penrith Panthers withdrawing as a result of participation in Las Vegas. Following Australia's 90–4 victory, criticism occurred as a result of the gulf in performance which highlighted the superior set up that women's rugby league had in Australia compared to England. In addition, the disparity in performance, along with the view that a quadruple-header was too long an event, lead to the Women's international being axed for the 2026 Las Vegas programme. In May 2025, the NRL announced the six participating teams, with Canterbury-Bankstown Bulldogs, St George Illawarra Dragons, Newcastle Knights, North Queensland Cowboys, Hull Kingston Rovers, and Leeds Rhinos making the trip. Wyke College dance group will perform as part of the match day entertainment during the Super League match. In the United States development match, both men's women's, and men's youth teams will face Scotland ahead of the main event.

The event attendance was 37,557 people, a slight decrease on the previous year.

However, the 2026 event continued to break records in terms of TV viewership in Australia. in addition 2.1 million people watched the event on TV, a 7% increase. The event was a TV audience club record for Newcastle and North Queensland, while Canterbury-Bankstown vs St George Illawarra set a new TV record for that specific fixture. In addition, the game between Leeds and Hull KR became the most watched Super League fixture by an Australian audience, beating the record set by Wigan vs Warrington at Vegas the year prior. However, the US average viewership on FS2 was "miserable", with each game attracting average viewership of 12,000, 6,000 and 2,000 respectively. On the pitch, the 2026 main event saw Leeds thrash the World Champions Hull KR in the Super League game, while in the NRL Newcastle gained victory over North Queensland and Canterbury-Bankstown's victory over St George Illawarra saw the first ever golden point rugby league game at the event. For the United States national team, the men's team beat Scotland, however the women's and men's U-19 side lost to the respective Scottish sides. Titans of Coal and LA Roosters won the men's and women's nines tournament respectively.

=== 2027 event ===
In October 2025, The Sydney Morning Herald reported that the NRL was planning to hold a global opening round, in which the Las Vegas festival will form a part. The idea, in addition to expanding the competition's global reach, would see the nine games of the opening round form a 24 hour continuous broadcast in Australia; made possible by the games being played in multiple timezones. At current, the NRL are planning for the global round to begin in Toulouse, part of France's rugby league heartlands, before games in Miami, the Vegas double-header, Honolulu, Hong Kong, Dubai, before finishing with a double-header in London. The proposal drew some criticism for its resemblance to the proposed breakaway Rugby 360 tournament (although a more apt comparison can be with the Game 39 proposal once floated for the English Premier League). This proposal was later postponed to 2028.

In May 2026, Leigh Leopards and Bradford Bulls were confirmed as the Super League fixture. The NRL sides were announced a day later with Melbourne Storm, Wests Tigers, Parramatta Eels, and Gold Coast Titans making the trip. St Helens and Hull FC has both shown interest for the Super League fixture and were considering favourite for the trip. However, both withdrew ahead of the announcement with Hull stating on field performance was their priority, and St Helens wanting to focus on "physical club infrastructure" but retaining interest for 2028. Following the announcement, the RFL had also confirmed Wakefield Trinity's interest in 2028; having declined 2027 so supporters could have more time to save for the trip.

== Results ==
=== Main event ===
The following is a list of results of teams who have played at the main event, held the Allegiant Stadium in Paradise.

Game		Competition	Date	Time	Team 1	Score	Team 2	Attendance	Report
2024	Game 1	2024 NRL season	2 March 2024	19:30 PST	Manly Warringah Sea Eagles	36–24	South Sydney Rabbitohs	40,746 (Note: The NRL announced an attendance of 40,746 for the event, a figure later contradicted by the Las Vegas Stadium Authority who reported a reduced attendance of 31,927.)	
2024	Game 2	2024 NRL season	2 March 2024	21:30 PST	Sydney Roosters	20–10	Brisbane Broncos	40,746	
2025	Game 1	2025 Super League season	1 March 2025	13:30 PST	Wigan Warriors	48–24	Warrington Wolves	45,209 (Note: The NRL announced an attendance of 45,209 for the event, a figure later contradicted by the Las Vegas Stadium Authority who reported a reduced attendance of 38,107.)	
2025	Game 2	2025 NRL season	1 March 2025	16:00 PST	Canberra Raiders	30–8	New Zealand Warriors	45,209	
2025	Game 3	Women's International	1 March 2025	18:15 PST	Australia Jillaroos	90–4	England Lionesses	45,209	
2025	Game 4	2025 NRL season	1 March 2025	20:30 PST	Penrith Panthers	28–22	Cronulla-Sutherland Sharks	45,209	
2026	Game 1	2026 Super League season	28 February 2026	16:00 PST	Hull Kingston Rovers	6–58	Leeds Rhinos	45,719 (Note: The NRL announced an attendance of 45,719 for the event, a figure later contradicted by the Las Vegas Stadium Authority who reported a reduced attendance of 37,557.)	
2026	Game 2	2026 NRL season	28 February 2026	18:15 PST	Newcastle Knights	28–18	North Queensland Cowboys	45,719	
2026	Game 3	2026 NRL season	28 February 2026	20:30 PST	Canterbury-Bankstown Bulldogs	15–14	St George Illawarra Dragons	45,719	

=== Development matches ===
A number of development games are held during the weekend to aid the growth of the United States national rugby league teams.

Game		Competition	Date	Time	Team 1	Score	Team 2	Venue	Report
2024	Game 1	Men's Senior International	1 March 2024	19:00 PT	United States	16–16	Canada	Ed W. Clark High School, Las Vegas	
2025	Game 1	Men's Senior International	26 February 2025	18:00 PT	United States	C–C (Note: Game cancelled due to thieves stealing the copper from the floodlights)	Greece	Silver Bowl Park, Las Vegas	N/A
2025	Game 2	Women's Senior International	28 February 2025	13:30 (Note: Brought forward from 17:30 due to floodlights not being available) PT	United States	46–0	Greece	Silver Bowl Park, Las Vegas	
2025	Game 3	Men's Senior International	28 February 2025	15:30 (Note: Brought forward from 19:30 due to floodlights not being available) PT	United States	10–46	Greece	Silver Bowl Park, Las Vegas	
2026	Game 1	Men's U-19 International	27 February 2026	15:45 PT	United States	10–30	Scotland	Coronado High School, Henderson	
2026	Game 2	Women's Senior International	27 February 2026	18:00 PT	United States	14–26	Scotland	Coronado High School, Henderson	
2026	Game 3	Men's Senior International	27 February 2026	20:15 PT	United States	28–20	Scotland	Coronado High School, Henderson	

=== Vegas Nines ===
Vegas Nines is an open registration nines tournament held prior to the United States national team games and the main event at the Allegiant Stadium.

Year	Men's				Women's			
Year	Winner	Score	Runners-up	Ref.	Winner	Score	Runners-up	Ref.
2024	Sacramento Immortals	22–8	Roots Rugby		Ontario Ospreys	16–10	British Columbia Storm	
2025	Carney's Titan Industries	30–10	Roots Rugby		Los Angeles Roosters	26–12	Indigenous Mana	
2026	Titans of Coal	26–4	United Sporting Club		Los Angeles Roosters	12–10	Aus Vegas Angles	

== Broadcasting ==
For 2024, 2025, and 2026 (AUS) main event

Region	Network
Australia	Kayo Sports; Fox League; Nine Network
New Zealand	Sky Sport (NRL games only)
United States	Fox Sports 1
Canada	Sportsnet
United Kingdom	Sky Sports Main Event (Note: 2025's Super League game was also shown free to air on Sky Mix)
France	Bis Télévision
Pacific Islands	Sky Pacific (2024 only)
Asia	Premier Sports Asia (2024 only)

Countries which did not have television rights to the games were able to stream the matches on Watch NRL.

== Statistics ==
=== Attendances ===
Year	Attendance	
Year	NRL Figure	Stadium Authority Figure
2024	40,927	31,927
2025	▲45,209	▲38,107
2026	▲45,719	▼37,557

NB: The Stadium Authority figures are that of ticket scans at the turnstile. Corporate and VIP ticket are not scanned to enter thus are not included in the Stadium Authority figure.

=== Games by competition ===
Competition	Games	Years
(Australia) National Rugby League	8	2024 (2), 2025 (2), 2026 (2), 2027 (2)
(United Kingdom) Super League	3	2025, 2026, 2027
Women's International	1	2025

=== Team appearances ===
Team	Apps.	Years
Brisbane Broncos	1	2024
Manly Warringah Sea Eagles	1	2024
South Sydney Rabbitohs	1	2024
Sydney Roosters	1	2024
Australia Jillaroos	1	2025
Canberra Raiders	1	2025
Cronulla-Sutherland Sharks	1	2025
England Lionesses	1	2025
New Zealand Warriors	1	2025
Penrith Panthers	1	2025
Warrington Wolves	1	2025
Wigan Warriors	1	2025
Canterbury-Bankstown Bulldogs	1	2026
Hull Kingston Rovers	1	2026
Leeds Rhinos	1	2026
Newcastle Knights	1	2026
North Queensland Cowboys	1	2026
St. George Illawarra Dragons	1	2026
Bradford Bulls	1	2027
Gold Coast Titans	1	2027
Leigh Leopards	1	2027
Melbourne Storm	1	2027
Parramatta Eels	1	2027
Wests Tigers	1	2027
