= 2025 World Club Challenge =

Rugby league competition

Penrith Panthers	Wigan Warriors
(NRL)	(Super League)
C	C
	1	2	Total
PEN	C	C	C
WIG	C	C	C
- Date: February 2025
- Stadium: Western Sydney Stadium (likely venue)

Broadcast partners

The 2025 World Club Challenge was intended to be the 31st staging of the World Club Challenge, an annual rugby league match between the reigning champions of the Super League and the National Rugby League.

The fixture would have been contested by 2024 NRL Grand Final champions Penrith Panthers and 2024 Super League Grand Final Champions Wigan Warriors, a rematch of the 2024 Competition.

== Details ==
Ahead of the 2024 NRL Grand Final, reports began circulating that the 2025 World Club Challenge was at risk of cancellation as teams that could potentially qualify (Penrith Panthers, Warrington Wolves, and Wigan Warriors) would have difficulty arranging travel to either the UK or Australia, then to the United States, with the usual date of the tournament being close to that of the 2025 Rugby League Las Vegas event. Following Penrith's victory in the Grand Final, thus qualification for the tournament, it was revealed that 15 or 16 February would be the latest they would play the tournament, leaving time for travel back to Australia then out to the United States, while also maximising their pre-season, citing player welfare as in issue. However, with this weekend being the opening weekend of the 2025 Super League season, the date was unlikely.

On 9th October 2024, Penrith confirmed to the NRL that they would not play the match before the start of the domestic seasons citing player welfare as the issue stating that their players were delaying their mandated leave to play in the 2024 Rugby League Pacific Championships and 2024 Samoa rugby league tour of England thus not allowing players to have an adequate preseason before the World Club Challenge. The club stated that it was open to working with the NRL for a solution to play the match, but would not play as things currently stood.

Following the conclusion of the 2024 Super League Grand Final, Wigan Warriors captain Liam Farrell confirmed the champions' commitment to the 2025 World Club Challenge and state that the club would be working to ensure the game goes ahead. These words later confirmed by CEO Kris Radlinski.

On 16 October, Radlinski contacted the NRL and Penrith about playing the game during Magic Round (requiring the NRL to schedule one of Penrith's byes for this round), an idea proposed on social media by Penrith's Nathan Cleary two days prior. However this idea never came to fruition with Penrith facing Brisbane in Magic Round.

In December, International Rugby League Chairman Troy Grant stated that, despite pressure, the organisation was unable to intervene or sanction Penrith for their withdrawal as the competition is run solely by the Rugby Football League; and as Australian clubs are outside the RFL's purview, neither could the RFL.
