= Daniel Tupou =

Australia and Tonga international rugby league footballer

Daniel "Toops" Tupou
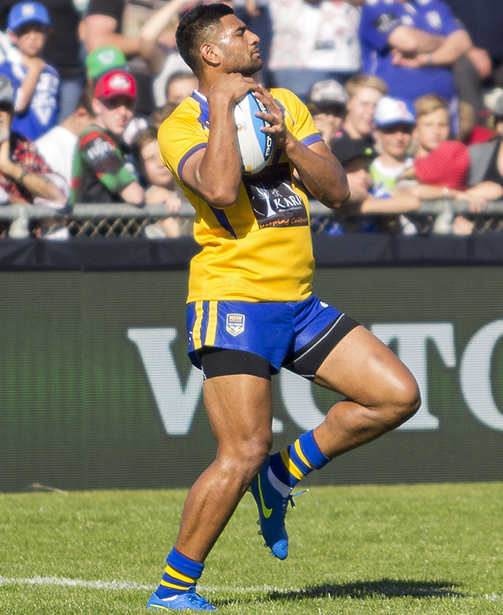

Personal information
- Full name: Daniel (Taniela) Tupou
- Born: 17 June 1991 (age 35) Sydney, New South Wales, Australia
- Height: 196 cm (6 ft 5 in)
- Weight: 105 kg (16 st 7 lb)

Playing information
- Position: Wing
Club
Years	Team	Pld	T	G	FG	P
2012–26	Sydney Roosters	307	198	0	0	792
Representative
Years	Team	Pld	T	G	FG	P
2013–25	Tonga	23	13	0	0	52
2014–15	NSW City	2	2	0	0	8
2014–22	New South Wales	10	3	0	0	12
2014	Prime Minister's XIII	1	0	0	0	0
2014	Australia	1	0	0	0	0
- Source: As of 4 October 2026

Daniel Tupou (born 17 June 1991) is a former professional rugby league footballer who played his entire career for the Sydney Roosters in the National Rugby League (NRL). He has played for Tonga and Australia at international level.

Tupou has played for the City Origin, New South Wales in the State of Origin series and Prime Minister's XIII sides. He won the 2013, 2018, 2019 and 2026 NRL Grand Final with the Sydney Roosters.

== Background ==
Tupou was born in Sydney, New South Wales, Australia. He is of Tongan descent.

== Playing career ==
Tupou played his junior rugby league for the Berala Bears and Guildford Owls before being signed by the Parramatta Eels. Tupou played for the Eels' NYC team in 2010 and 2011, scoring 9 tries in 22 games, before being signed by the Roosters.

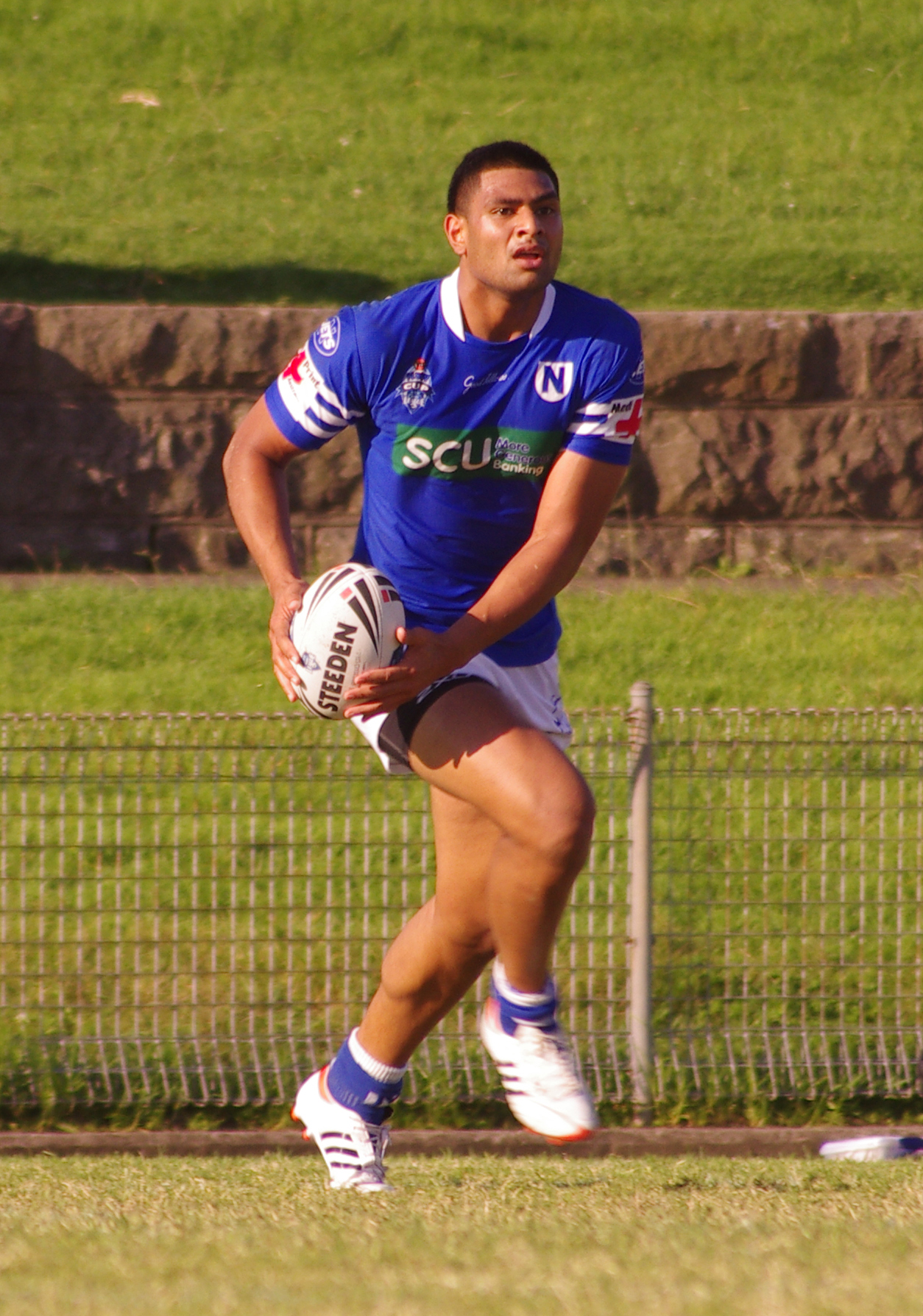
Tupou playing for the Newtown Jets

=== 2012 ===
In Round 24, Tupou made his NRL debut for the Sydney Roosters against the Canberra Raiders in the Roosters 24–20 loss at Canberra Stadium. In just his second game, Tupou scored 3 tries against the Wests Tigers in the Roosters 44–20 win at the SFS. Tupou played in three matches and scored three tries for the Sydney Roosters in his debut year. On 12 September, Tupou was named at wing in the NSW Cup Team of the Year. On 30 September, he played for the Newtown Jets in their New South Wales Cup 22–16 Grand Final win over the Balmain Ryde-Eastwood Tigers.

=== 2013 ===
On 26 February, Tupou extended his contract with the Roosters to the end of the 2015 season. He became a full-time first grader in 2013, scoring 14 tries from 26 games. His most impressive try came in the 2013 NRL Grand Final when he leapt over Manly's David Williams to level the game at 6–6. Roosters went on to win the Grand Final 26–18 against the Manly-Warringah Sea Eagles.

Tupou was named in the 24-man Tongan 2013 Rugby League World Cup squad. He made his Tongan international debut against Scotland on the wing in the 26–24 loss at Derwent Park. Tupou played in all of Tonga's three matches in the tournament.

=== 2014 ===
On 4 May, Tupou was selected for NSW City in the City vs Country Origin match in Dubbo, New South Wales. He played on the wing and scored two tries in the 26-all draw. Tupou was selected to make his debut for the New South Wales Blues in Game 1 of the 2014 State of Origin series on the wing in the 100th State of Origin match in the Blues 12–8 win at Suncorp Stadium. He also played in the next game as NSW won 6–4, resulting in the Blues breaking their 8-year losing streak, and in Game 3. Tupou scored 14 tries in 19 matches with the Sydney Roosters.

On 12 October, Tupou played on the wing for Prime Minister's XIII in the 34–16 win over Papua New Guinea. He was selected in the Australia Kangaroos 24-man squad for the 2014 Four Nations. Tupou made his international debut on the wing in the Kangaroos 30–12 loss against New Zealand at Suncorp Stadium, his only appearance in the tournament.

=== 2015 ===
Tupou was again selected for New South Wales City. He played for New South Wales in Game 1 of the 2015 State of Origin series, in a 10–11 loss, but was dropped for the rest of the series. On 27 July, he re-signed with the Roosters, keeping him at the club to the end of the 2017 season. He finished the season having played in all of the Roosters' 27 matches and scoring 16 tries.

=== 2016 ===
In February, Tupou played for the Sydney Roosters in the Auckland Nines. He scored 10 tries from 21 games with the Roosters.

=== 2017 ===
In Round 4 against cross-city rivals the South Sydney Rabbitohs, Tupou played his 100th NRL match and scored a try in the Roosters 20–6 win at ANZ Stadium.

In 2017 Tupou elected to represent the nation of his ancestral heritage, Tonga. He played wing in every game of their stunning charge to the 2017 Rugby League World Cup semi-finals. He scored 2 tries in their win over Scotland in the pool stage of the tournament.

=== 2018 ===
Tupou was part of the Eastern Suburbs side which won their 4th minor premiership in six years. On 30 September, Tupou played on the wing and scored the game's first try in Easts 21–6 victory over Melbourne in the 2018 NRL Grand Final.

=== 2019 ===
In round 2 of the 2019 NRL season, Tupou scored two tries as the Sydney Roosters defeated Manly-Warringah 26–18 at Brookvale Oval. In round 21, Tupou scored two tries as his team defeated Canberra 22–18 at Canberra Stadium.

Tupou made a total of 26 appearances for the Sydney Roosters as the club won their second consecutive premiership defeating Canberra 14–8 in the 2019 NRL Grand Final with Tupou playing on the wing. Tupou was involved in the match winning play late in the second half when he passed the ball on the inside to James Tedesco who raced away to score the deciding try. The premiership victory was Tupou's third as a player.

=== 2020 ===
On 22 February, Tupou played for the Roosters in their 2020 World Club Challenge victory defeating St Helens 20–12.

In round 16 of the 2020 NRL season, he scored two tries in a 58–12 victory over Brisbane at the Sydney Cricket Ground.

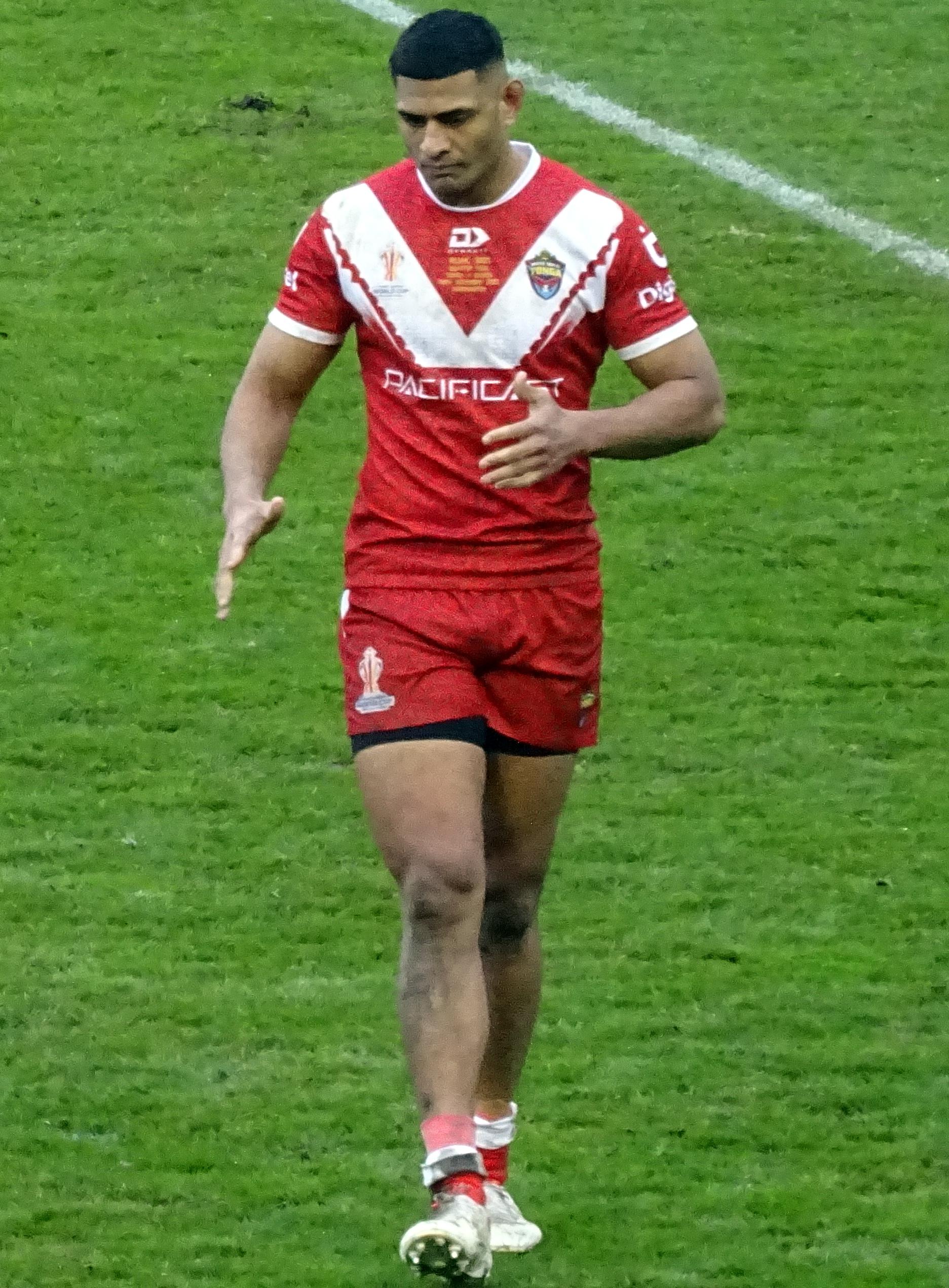
Tupou playing for Tonga at the 2021 RLWC

In round 18 of the 2020 NRL season against Newcastle, Tupou scored two tries to become the 4th Sydney Roosters player to score 100 tries.

Tupou was later selected for the 2020 State of Origin series. He played in all three matches, scoring two tries, as New South Wales suffered a shock 2–1 series loss against Queensland.

=== 2021 ===
In round 10 of the 2021 NRL season, he scored two tries in the club's 30–16 victory over North Queensland.

In round 23, Tupou scored a hat-trick in the club's 40–22 victory over St. George Illawarra.

Tupou played a total of 26 games for the Sydney Roosters including the club's two finals matches. The Roosters would be eliminated from the second week of the finals losing to Manly 42–6.

=== 2022 ===
On 29 May, Tupou was selected by New South Wales to play in game one of the 2022 State of Origin series. Tupou played in all three games as New South Wales lost the series 2–1.

In round 19 of the 2022 NRL season, Tupou scored two tries in a 42–12 victory over Newcastle.

In round 23, Tupou scored two tries in a 72–6 victory over the Wests Tigers.

Tupou finished as the clubs top try scorer with 16 tries for the year. Tupou played a total of 22 games as the club finished sixth on the table and reached the finals. Tupou played in the Sydney Roosters elimination final loss to arch-rivals South Sydney.

In the second round of group matches at the 2021 Rugby League World Cup, Tupou scored a hat-trick in Tonga's 32–6 victory over Wales. In the third group game, Tupou scored two tries in Tonga's 92–10 victory over the Cook Islands.

=== 2023 ===
In round 22 of the 2023 NRL season, Tupou became the Sydney Roosters record try scorer after he crossed over in the 70th minute of the clubs 32–10 loss against Brisbane at The Gabba. The following week, he scored two tries for the club in their 26–16 victory over Manly. Tupou signed a one-year extension with the club for the 2024 season. Tupou played 18 matches for the Sydney Roosters in the 2023 NRL season as the club finished 7th on the table and qualified for the finals.

=== 2024 ===
On 29 July, it was announced that Tupou had re-signed with the club until the end of the 2026 season. Tupou played 24 games for the Sydney Roosters in the 2024 NRL season scoring 21 tries. Tupou played in all three finals matches for the club as they were eliminated at the preliminary final stage by Melbourne.Tupou played his first pacific championship game against the Australian Kangaroos and lost 18-0.

=== 2025 ===
In round 12 of the 2025 NRL season, Tupou scored two tries for the Sydney Roosters in their 42-16 upset victory over Cronulla. In round 24, Tupou scored a hat-trick as the Sydney Roosters upset Canterbury 32-12. Tupou played 24 games for the Sydney Roosters in the 2025 NRL season and scored 19 tries as the club finished 8th on the table and qualified for the finals. He played in the club’s elimination final loss against Cronulla.

=== 2026 ===
Tedesco played 18 games for the Sydney Roosters in the 2026 NRL season including the clubs 2026 NRL Grand Final victory over Newcastle. On 7 October, just days after winning his fourth premiership, Tupou announced his retirement from the NRL after playing his entire career at the Sydney Roosters.

== Statistics ==
- † denotes premiership winning year

Year	Team	Games	Tries	Pts
2012	Sydney Roosters	3	3	12
2013 †	Sydney Roosters	26	14	56
2014	Sydney Roosters	19	14	56
2015	Sydney Roosters	27	16	64
2016	Sydney Roosters	21	10	40
2017	Sydney Roosters	21	11	44
2018 †	Sydney Roosters	17	8	32
2019 †	Sydney Roosters	26	15	60
2020	Sydney Roosters	15	11	44
2021	Sydney Roosters	26	15	60
2022	Sydney Roosters	22	16	64
2023	Sydney Roosters	18	10	40
2024	Sydney Roosters	24	21	84
2025	Sydney Roosters	24	19	76
2026 †	Sydney Roosters	17	15	60
	Totals	307	198	792
