= 2013 NRL Grand Final =

Australian rugby league match

Sydney Roosters	Manly Warringah Sea Eagles
26	18
	1	2	Total
SYD	8	18	26
MAN	6	12	18
- Date: 6 October 2013
- Stadium: ANZ Stadium
- Location: Sydney
- Clive Churchill Medal: Daly Cherry-Evans
- Australian National anthem: Jessica Mauboy
- Referee: Shayne Hayne; Ben Cummins; Steve Carrall (Touch Judge); Russell Turner (Touch Judge)
- Attendance: 81,491

Broadcast partners
- Broadcasters: Nine Network
- Commentators: Ray Warren; Peter Sterling; Phil Gould

The 2013 NRL Grand Final was the conclusive and premiership-deciding game of the 2013 NRL season. Played on Sunday, 6 October at Sydney's ANZ Stadium between the minor premiers Sydney Roosters and the Manly Warringah Sea Eagles. The Roosters won the match 26–18 to claim their 13th premiership title, and became the first team since the St George Illawarra Dragons in 2010 to win both the minor premiership and the premiership in the same season.

== Background ==
The NRL premiership for the 2013 season was decided between two Sydney based clubs, the minor premiers Sydney Roosters and the 4th-placed Manly Warringah Sea Eagles. It was the first time in 41 years the two sides played for a premiership title, Manly being victorious on the previous occasion, claiming the 1972 title 19–14 in the then NSWRL competition. Both the Roosters and Manly-Warringah had featured prominently in grand finals since the turn of the new century, with the Roosters making the grand finals in 2000, 2002, 2003, 2004 and 2010, whilst the Manly club had featured in 2007, 2008 and 2011 deciders. Despite making the most appearances in the past 14 seasons the Roosters had only been successful in one of their six previous appearances, when they defeated grand final debutants New Zealand Warriors 30 points to 8 in 2002. Manly's last premiership victory was also against the New Zealand Warriors when they defeated them in the 2011 decider 24 points to 10. It marked the first time since 2005 that neither Wayne Bennett, Craig Bellamy or Des Hasler will not coach a side to a grand final, as each had claimed a grand final victory during the previous seven seasons. Both Trent Robinson and Geoff Toovey were debutant grand final coaches in their first and second respective years in the NRL.

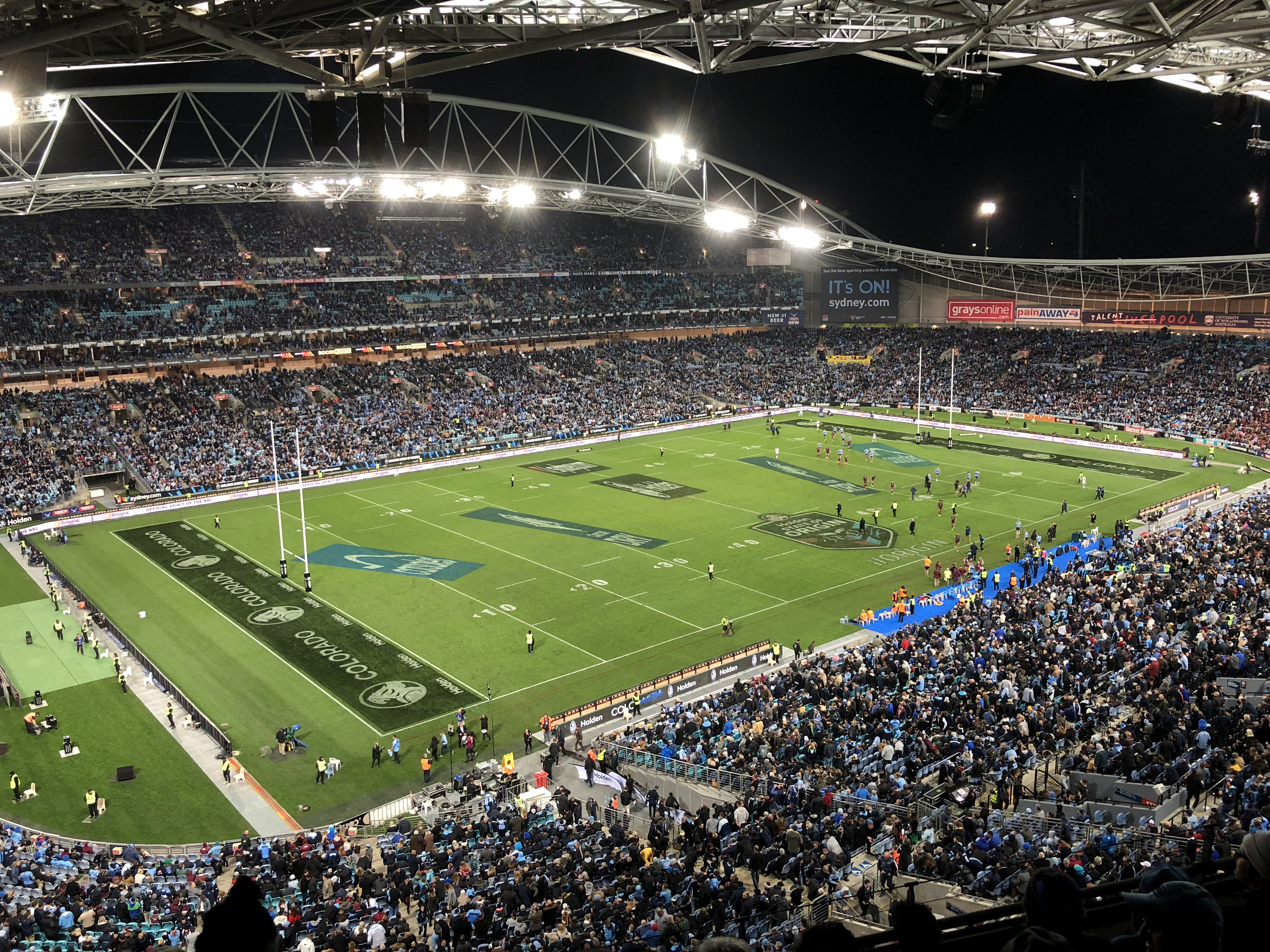
ANZ Stadium, where the match was played

== Team lists ==
Sydney Roosters	Position	Manly Warringah Sea Eagles
Anthony Minichiello (c)	Fullback	Brett Stewart
Daniel Tupou	Wing	Jorge Taufua
Michael Jennings	Centre	Jamie Lyon (c)
Shaun Kenny-Dowall	Centre	Steve Matai
Roger Tuivasa-Sheck	Wing	David Williams
James Maloney	Five-eighth	Kieran Foran
Mitchell Pearce	Halfback	Daly Cherry-Evans
Jared Waerea-Hargreaves	Prop	Brenton Lawrence
Jake Friend	Hooker	Matt Ballin
Sam Moa	Prop	Brent Kite
Aidan Guerra	2nd Row	Anthony Watmough
Sonny Bill Williams	2nd Row	Justin Horo
Boyd Cordner	Lock	Glenn Stewart
Frank-Paul Nuuausala	Interchange	David Gower
Daniel Mortimer	Interchange	Jamie Buhrer
Mitchell Aubusson	Interchange	Tom Symonds
Luke O'Donnell	Interchange	George Rose
Trent Robinson	Coach	Geoff Toovey

Note: Both Boyd Cordner and Luke O'Donnell were late inclusions to the Roosters squad with Cordner replacing Frank-Paul Nuuausala at lock and both Nuuausala and O'Donnell replacing Isaac Liu and Dylan Napa on the interchange bench.

=== Milestones ===
- Long standing Roosters fullback Anthony Minichiello played his sixth grand final for his club after having previously featured in every premiership decider they have reached since 2000, although his only victory came from 2002. Were the Roosters to lose the game he would have been the first player in the history of Australian rugby league to lose five grand finals.
- Jamie Lyon, Brett Stewart, Glenn Stewart, Steve Matai, Brent Kite and Anthony Watmough all played their fourth grand final together, after having previously appeared in their past three appearances for Manly in 2007, 2008 and 2011.

== Match details ==
Sunday, 6 October
19:30 AEDT (UTC+11)

Sydney Roosters	26 – 18	Manly Warringah Sea Eagles
Tries: 4 Tupou 25'; Guerra 55'; Kenny-Dowall 60'; Jennings 72'; Goals: 5 Maloney 27', pen 32', 56', 62', 74' (5/5)	1st: 8–6; 2nd: 18–12	Tries: 3 Taufua 9'; Lyon (penalty) 43'; Matai 49'; Goals: 3 Lyon pen 17', 44', 51' (3/4)

ANZ Stadium, Sydney
Referees: Shayne Hayne, Ben Cummins
Clive Churchill Medal: Daly Cherry-Evans (Manly)

=== 1st half ===
Manly began strongly and had control early on. Pressure led to Roosters five-eighth James Maloney kicking out on the full, and a tackle from his opposing number Kieran Foran on back-rower Sonny-Bill Williams led to a dropped ball and possession for the Manly side, which quickly led to their first try, scored by winger Jorge Taufua. Captain Jamie Lyon missed the conversion, making it 4–0 to Manly-Warringah, however a penalty a few minutes later led to a scoreline of 6–0 by the 17th minute. The Roosters came back to score through winger Daniel Tupou on the back of a cross-field bomb from Maloney, and the Five-eighth's sideline conversion brought the scoreline to 6–6. A few minutes later a contentious penalty to the Roosters gave them another two points, and they took the lead into the halftime break, 8–6.

=== 2nd half ===
In only the 43rd minute, Manly were in scoring position, with halfback Daly Cherry-Evans grubber-kicking for Lyon, however he was tackled without the ball by Roosters substitute Mitch Aubusson, leading the video referees to rule a penalty try. Lyon converted it to bring Manly-Warringah back to the lead at 12–8. A forced drop-out conceded by the Roosters put Manly into attacking position quickly and they capitalised, Matai scoring and Lyon again converting to push the score out to 18–8 with only 30 minutes remaining. Roosters back-rower Aiden Guerra next scored however, and a conversion brought the Roosters back into the game at 18–14, before a line-break and offload from Williams to Maloney opened Manly's defensive line. Maloney sprinted downfield and gave a pass to Minichello. The Roosters captain then put centre Shaun Kenny-Dowall in to score which, along with a conversion from Maloney, put the Minor Premiers back in the lead at 20–18 with 18 minutes to go. An error from the Roosters put Manly back into contention, but a knock on from winger David Williams and a lack of capitalisation on a Roosters mistake brought them back to the Manly end of the field following another line-break from the Roosters' Williams. A grubber kick from Maloney led to a freakish try to centre Michael Jennings, who grounded the ball only centimetres inside the dead ball line. A final conversion to Maloney took the score to 26–18, and even a short kick-off attempt from Manly couldn't crack the Roosters' defence in the last six minutes of play.

=== Post-match ===
Sydney Roosters captain Anthony Minichiello became the first fullback to captain his team to a Grand Final victory since Frank 'Skinny' McMillan in 1934. Manly halfback Daly Cherry-Evans was awarded the Clive Churchill Medal for best and fairest in the Grand Final, the first awarded to a player from a losing side since 1993, and only the third time this had happened, at the time. Jack Wighton, from the Canberra Raiders, later achieved this, coincidentally against the Roosters, in 2019. Roosters coach Trent Robinson became the first coach to win a premiership in their first year of coaching in the NRL since Ricky Stuart in 2002.

The premiership rings awarded to the members of the winning team were worth AU$6,000.

== Opening Games ==
Sunday, 6 October

New Zealand Warriors U20s	30 – 42	Penrith Panthers U20s

ANZ Stadium, Sydney

Sunday, 6 October

Windsor Wolves	8 – 36	Cronulla-Sutherland Sharks

ANZ Stadium, Sydney

== Aftermath ==
The Roosters' premiership victory qualified them for the 2014 World Club Challenge, to be played in the 2014 pre-season against the winners of the 2013 Super League Grand final, Wigan Warriors.
