= Boyd Cordner =

Australia international rugby league footballer

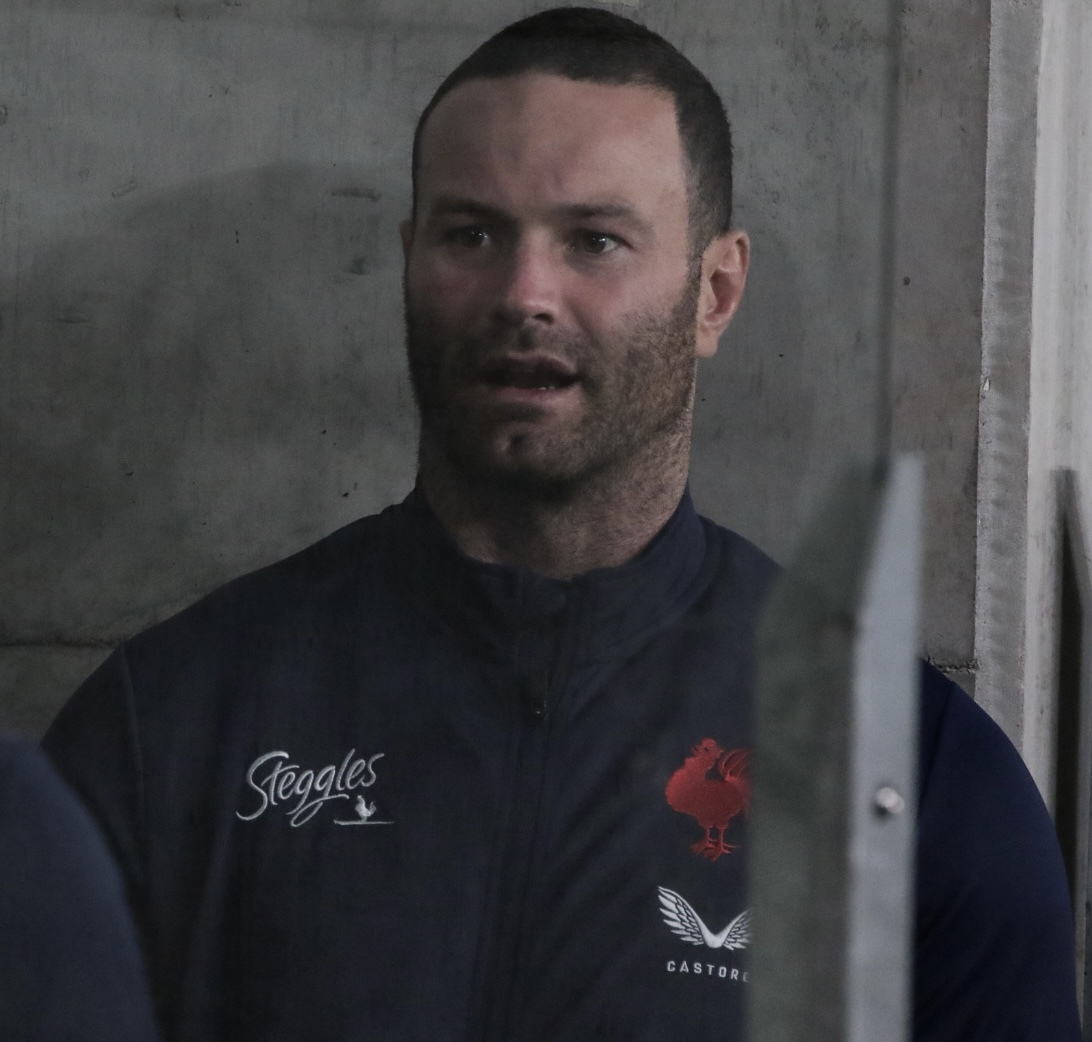

Personal information
- Born: 9 June 1992 (age 34) Taree, New South Wales, Australia

Playing information
- Height: 188 cm (6 ft 2 in)
- Weight: 102 kg (16 st 1 lb)
- Position: Second-row, Lock
Club
Years	Team	Pld	T	G	FG	P
2011–20	Sydney Roosters	183	50	1	0	202
Representative
Years	Team	Pld	T	G	FG	P
2013–16	Country NSW	2	1	0	0	4
2013–20	New South Wales	16	2	0	0	8
2013–19	Australia	20	4	0	0	16
2016	Prime Minister's XIII	1	0	0	0	0

Boyd Cordner (born 9 June 1992) is an Australian former professional rugby league footballer who played as a second-row forward for the Sydney Roosters in the National Rugby League (NRL) and Australia at international level.

He has played for Country Origin and New South Wales in the State of Origin series. Cordner won premierships with the Roosters in the 2013 NRL season, 2018 NRL season, and 2019 NRL season. Cordner captained the Roosters, New South Wales and Australia.

== Early life ==
Cordner was born in Taree on the Mid North Coast region of New South Wales. Cordner's mother, Lanai, died of breast cancer when he was four years old, leaving his father Chris to raise him along with his brother Dane.

Cordner played his junior football for the Old Bar Pirates and Taree Red Rovers and attended St Clare's High School before being recruited by the Sydney Roosters.

== Playing career ==
Cordner played for the Newtown Jets SG Ball side before playing for the Sydney Roosters NYC team between 2009 and 2011.

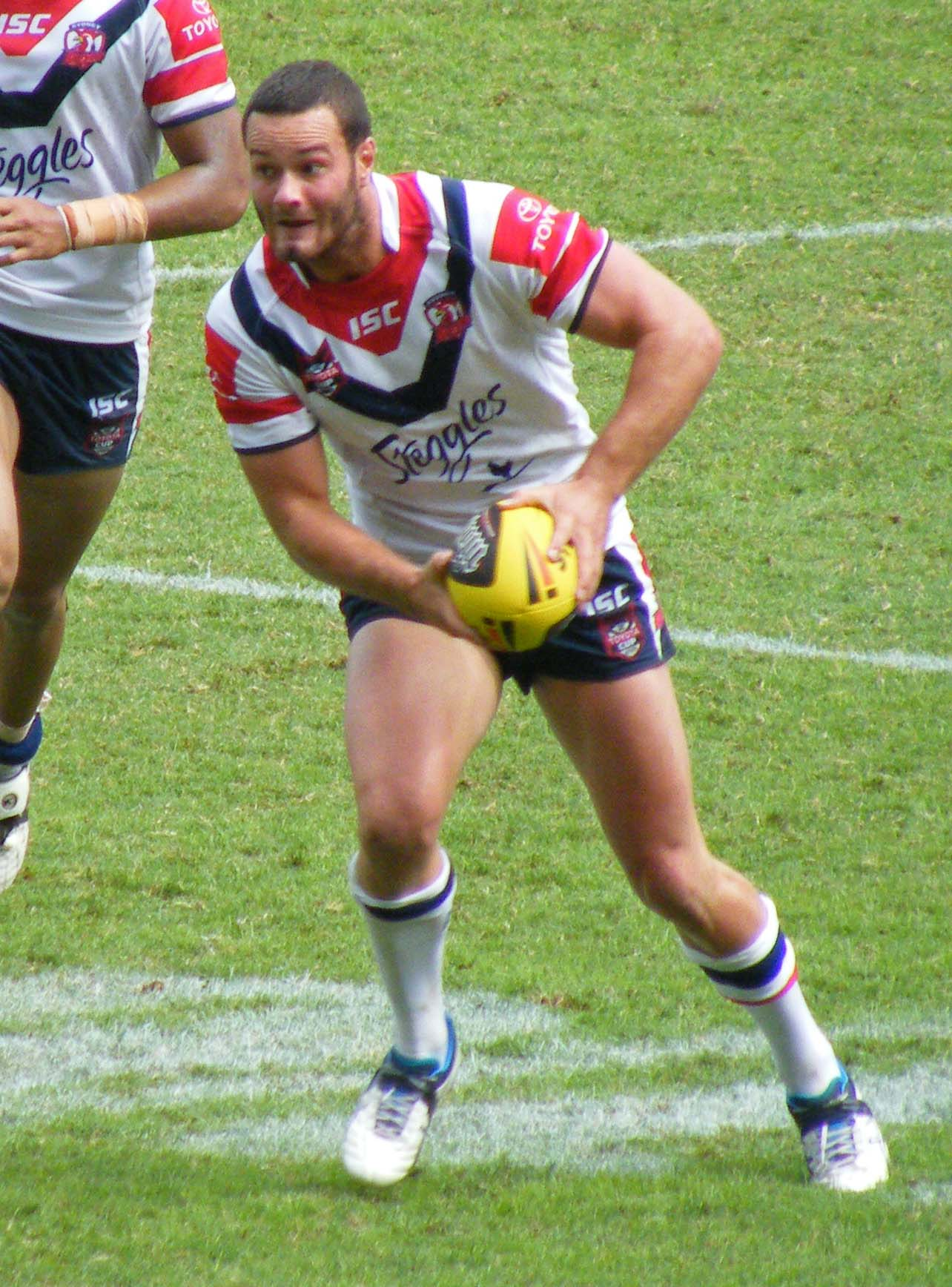
Cordner playing for the Roosters in 2011

=== 2011 ===
In Round 13 of the 2011 NRL season, Cordner made his NRL debut for the Sydney Roosters against the New Zealand Warriors at the SFS, playing off the interchange bench in the Roosters 13–6 win. Cordner finished his debut year in the NRL with him playing in seven matches for the Sydney Roosters.

=== 2012 ===
In Round 4, against the Melbourne Storm at AAMI Park, Cordner scored his first NRL career try in the Roosters 4–44 loss.

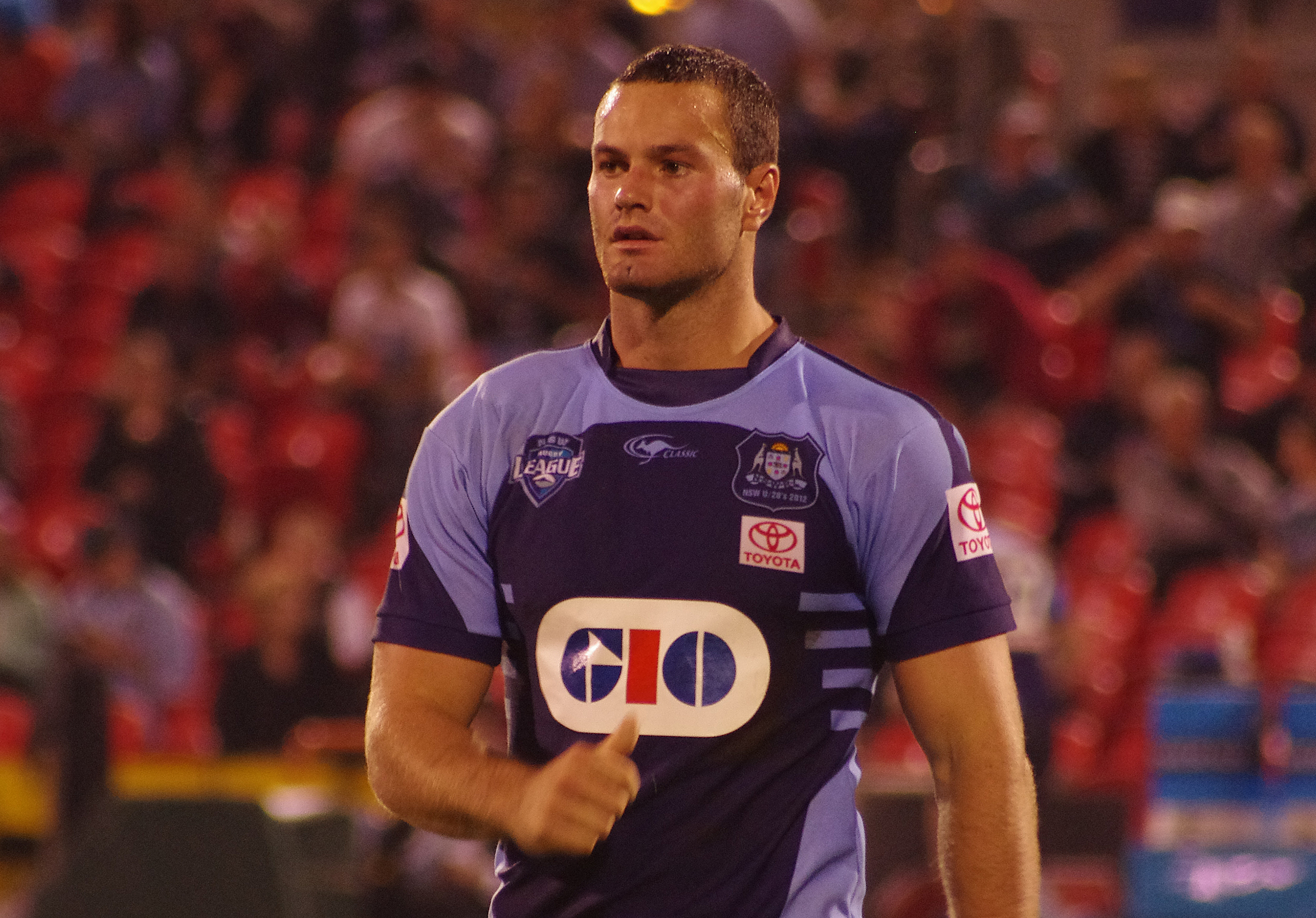
Boyd Cordner playing for NSW under-20s in 2012

In April 2012, Cordner was selected as captain of the New South Wales team in the inaugural under 20s State of Origin, Cordner played at second-row in NSW's 18–14 win over Queensland at Penrith Stadium. Cordner finished the Roosters 2012 NRL season with him playing in 22 matches and scoring four tries.

=== 2013 ===
In January 2013, Cordner extended his contract for a further three years, keeping him at the Sydney Roosters until the end of the 2016 NRL season. In April 2013, Cordner was selected for the NSW Country team, playing second-row in Country's 18–12 win at Coffs Harbour. Cordner was selected for the New South Wales team on the interchange bench in Game III of the 2013 State of Origin series in NSW's 10–12 loss at ANZ Stadium. In Round 22 against the Canberra Raiders at the SFS, Cordner suffered a broken ankle in the Roosters 28–22 win, making Cordner race the clock to be back for the Roosters in the finals series. Cordner recovered from the injury just in time for the Roosters 2013 NRL Grand Final against the Manly-Warringah Sea Eagles, starting at lock in the number 18 jersey and shifting Frank-Paul Nu'uausala back to the interchange bench. The Roosters won the Grand Final 26–18. On 1 October 2013, Cordner won the 2013 Dally M Second Rower of the year award. Cordner finished off his impressive 2013 NRL season with him playing in 20 matches, scoring 9 tries and kicking a goal for the Roosters. On 7 October 2013, Cordner was selected for the Australia's 24-man 2013 World Cup squad, playing in 2 matches and making his Australian national debut against Fiji off the interchange bench in the Kangaroos 34–2 win at Langtree Park.

=== 2014 ===
Cordner was selected for the Australian squad to play against New Zealand in the 2014 Anzac Test at the SFS. Cordner started at second-row in the Kangaroos 30–18 win. Cordner was selected for Game 3 of the New South Wales 2014 State of Origin side. Cordner played off the interchange bench in the match at Suncorp Stadium. Cordner finished off the Roosters' 2014 NRL season with him playing in 22 matches and scoring 9 tries. In October 2014, Cordner was selected in the Australian 24-man Four Nations squad.

=== 2015 ===
Cordner was selected for New South Wales for the 2015 State of Origin series, playing in all 3 matches off the interchange bench in the Blues 2–1 series loss. Cordner finished the 2015 NRL season with him playing in 25 matches and scoring seven tries and being awarded as the winner of the Jack Gibson player of the year medal at the Sydney Roosters awards night.

=== 2016 ===
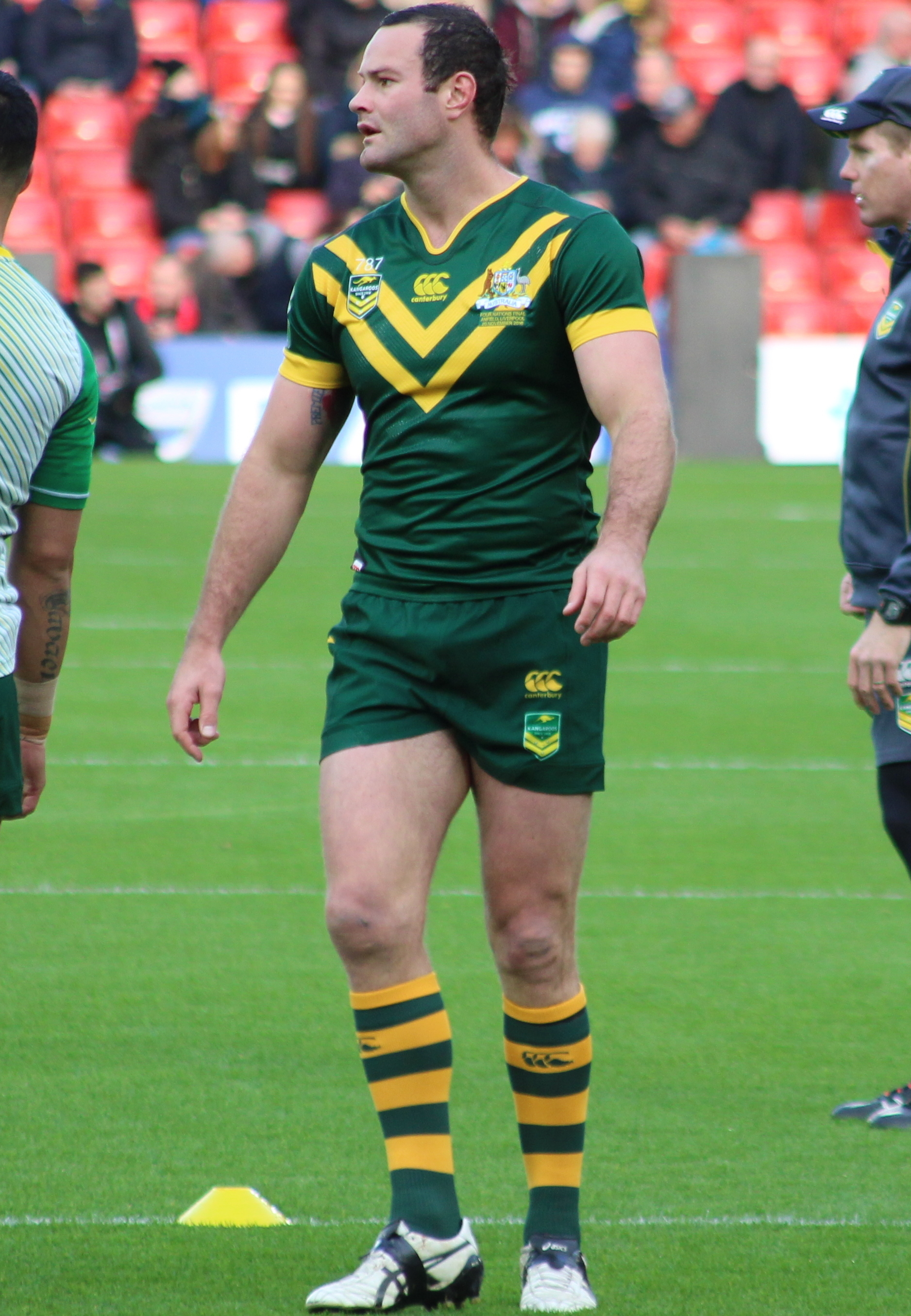
Cordner playing for Australia in 2016

On 5 February 2016, Cordner suffered a pectoral muscle injury which made him miss the early rounds of the 2016 NRL season. In round 8 against the St. George Illawarra Dragons in the ANZAC Day match, Cordner made his return from injury in the 20–18 loss at the Sydney Football Stadium. On 8 May 2016, Cordner played for Country Origin against City Origin, where he started at second-row and scored a try in the 44–30 loss in Tamworth. In round 11 against the Canterbury-Bankstown Bulldogs, Cordner played his 100th NRL career match in the Roosters 32–20 loss at ANZ Stadium. Cordner played in game 1 of the 2016 State of Origin series for New South Wales against Queensland, where he scored the first try of the match in the Blues 6–4 loss at ANZ Stadium. Cordner didn't feature in games 2 and 3 due to a foot injury. Cordner finished his injury riddled 2016 NRL season with him playing in 12 matches and scoring four tries for the Roosters. On 24 September 2016, Cordner played for Prime Minister's XIII against Papua New Guinea, where he started at second-row in the 58-0 smashing win in Port Moresby. On 4 October 2016, Cordner was selected in the Australian Kangaroos final 24-man squad for the tournament.

=== 2017 ===
In 2017, Cordner captained New South Wales in the 2017 State of Origin series which was won by Queensland 2–1. Cordner was also named Roosters co-captain, leading them to the preliminary final but falling short of a grand final appearance losing to the North Queensland Cowboys 29–16. Later that year, Boyd Cordner would be selected for Australia's final World Cup squad, where he scored the winning (and only) try in the final, beating England 6–0.

=== 2018 ===
Cordner again captained New South Wales in 2018, this time the Blues won the series 2–1; their first series win since 2014. Cordner was part of the Roosters side which won their 4th minor premiership in 6 years. On 30 September, Cordner co-captained the Sydney Roosters as the club defeated the Melbourne Storm 21–6 in the 2018 NRL grand final. He was later named in the Australian squad for their upcoming test matches, and was named captain after Greg Inglis’ suspension from the squad after his drink driving charge.

=== 2019 ===
Cordner played in all three games for New South Wales in the 2019 State of Origin series in which New South Wales won the series 2–1. Cordner made a total of 19 appearances for the Sydney Roosters in the 2019 NRL season as the club finished second on the table and qualified for the finals. Cordner co-captained the club in the 2019 NRL Grand Final where they defeated Canberra 14–8 at ANZ Stadium and won their second consecutive premiership. The premiership victory was Cordner's third as a player.

On 7 October, Cordner was named in the Australian side for the Oceania Cup fixtures.

=== 2020 ===
Cordner was rested from the Sydney Roosters in their 2020 World Club Challenge victory over St Helens R.F.C., due to the club trying to reduce his workload.

Cordner played 13 games for the Sydney Roosters in the 2020 NRL season, scoring 2 tries. The club finished fourth and qualified for the finals but were eliminated after consecutive losses ended their quest for three premiership victories in a row.

=== 2021 ===
Side-lined for the entire first half of the year while recovering from multiple concussions, Cordner was forced into retirement due to ongoing symptoms.

== Statistics ==
Year	Team	Games	Tries	Goals	Pts
2011	Sydney Roosters	7			
2012	Sydney Roosters	22	4		16
2013	Sydney Roosters	20	9	1	38
2014	Sydney Roosters	22	9		36
2015	Sydney Roosters	25	7		28
2016	Sydney Roosters	12	4		16
2017	Sydney Roosters	18	5		20
2018	Sydney Roosters	23	3		12
2019	Sydney Roosters	19	7		28
2020	Sydney Roosters	13	2		8
	Totals	183	50	1	202
