= World Club Challenge =

Annual rugby league competition

- Current season or competition: 2026 World Club Challenge
- Sport: Rugby league
- Instituted: 1976; 50 years ago
- Inaugural season: 1976
- Number of teams: 2
- Nations: Australia; England; France; New Zealand; Wales
- World Champions: (England) Hull Kingston Rovers (2026)
- Most titles: (Australia) Sydney Roosters (England) Wigan Warriors (5 titles)
- Broadcast partner: Nine Network; Sky Sport; Sky Sports; BBC Sport; NITV
- Related competition: National Rugby League; Super League; World Club Series

The World Club Challenge is an annual rugby league competition between the winners of the Australian National Rugby League and the British Super League, for the de facto club world championship of the sport.

Super League sides have won the competition 16 times with National Rugby League sides having 14 wins.

The first such match was played in 1976, although this was not an official competitive game. The first official World Club Challenge saw Widnes Vikings beat Canberra Raiders 30–18 at Old Trafford on 4 October 1989, after which it became a semi-regular fixture, though was paused in the 1990s due to the Super League war. The competition has been held almost every year since 2000.

Sydney Roosters and Wigan Warriors have both won the competition 5 times, the joint highest in all formats since the competition began.

Hull KR are the most recent champions after winning the 2026 event, defeating the Brisbane Broncos 30–24 at the MKM Stadium.

== History ==
=== 1976–1999: Origin and development ===
The competition began unofficially in 1976 as a match between Sydney's Eastern Suburbs and Premiership winners St. Helens. This inaugural clash was proposed as merely a 'one-off' game, and was played at the Sydney Cricket Ground on June 29, in the midst of the 1976 NSWRFL season.

While some considered it an unnecessary disruption to both teams' campaigns in their respective domestic competitions, a healthy crowd of 26,856 turned out for the match, indicating that it was indeed a viable initiative. Leading into the match, St. Helens opted to play two warm-up games against a Queensland and Auckland representative team respectively, and lost both. In order to prove their triumph was legitimate, and not a result of fatigue on behalf of St. Helens, Eastern Suburbs challenged both representative sides who had defeated St. Helens. While Queensland declined the offer, Auckland eagerly accepted, and were ultimately defeated by the tricolours 26–22 in front of an enthusiastic home crowd. Because the 1976 clash was a standalone game, there were no immediate plans for a follow-up match the next season, or indeed any in the foreseeable future.

The concept would not return until 1987, when another unofficial match took place. Wigan chairman Maurice Lindsay invited Manly-Warringah to Central Park. Long-serving Manly secretary Ken Arthurson proposed that the prize money should be split between the two clubs, regardless of the outcome, however, Lindsay argued that the game should be played under a 'winner-takes-all' stipulation, believing that it would result in the players and fans taking the game more seriously. Played on a dry October night, the match between Manly and Wigan was a tough, at times spiteful, encounter which attracted 36,895 spectators to Wigan's Central Park, most of whom spilled onto the ground at fulltime in celebration of the home side's 8–2 victory. Manly forward Ron Gibbs became the first player to be sent off in a World Club Challenge game during the match, as he was given his marching orders following an illegal elbow to Wigan centre Joe Lydon as he attempted a drop-goal.

Sea Eagles captain Paul Vautin would later claim that his side's loss came down to the team's lackadaisical attitude toward the game, saying that Manly treated the fixture as an opportunity to travel to England for a holiday, where they would continue their grand final celebrations.

The first officially recognised World Club Challenge was between Widnes and Canberra in 1989. Three more World Club Challenge games were played in the 1990s – 1991, 1992 and 1994 – with Wigan appearing in all three (winning the first at Anfield, Liverpool, losing to the Brisbane Broncos at home in the second before memorably defeating the same opponent in their own city in the third).

If only we could see a genuine contest between Wigan and Brisbane – a World Club final. Alas, it will never happen. Oh sure, a game might be arranged, but logistics dictate that one side would be out of season, rusty or tired, and away from home.

— The Sydney Morning Herald, September 1992

After the 1994 match logistical issues meant the concept was put on hiatus until it was revived in 1997.

With the outbreak of Australia's Super League War in 1995, the World Club Challenge was not staged again until 1997 when the competition was restructured to include the twenty-two clubs from the Australasian Super League and the European Super League. The twelve Australian Rugby League affiliated clubs did not take part. With six rounds in two hemispheres and $1,000,000 prize money, the competition was prohibitively expensive to stage and reportedly lost over $5,000,000. This, coupled with the poor ratings and attendances both in Australia and Europe, led to the competition being postponed for two seasons.

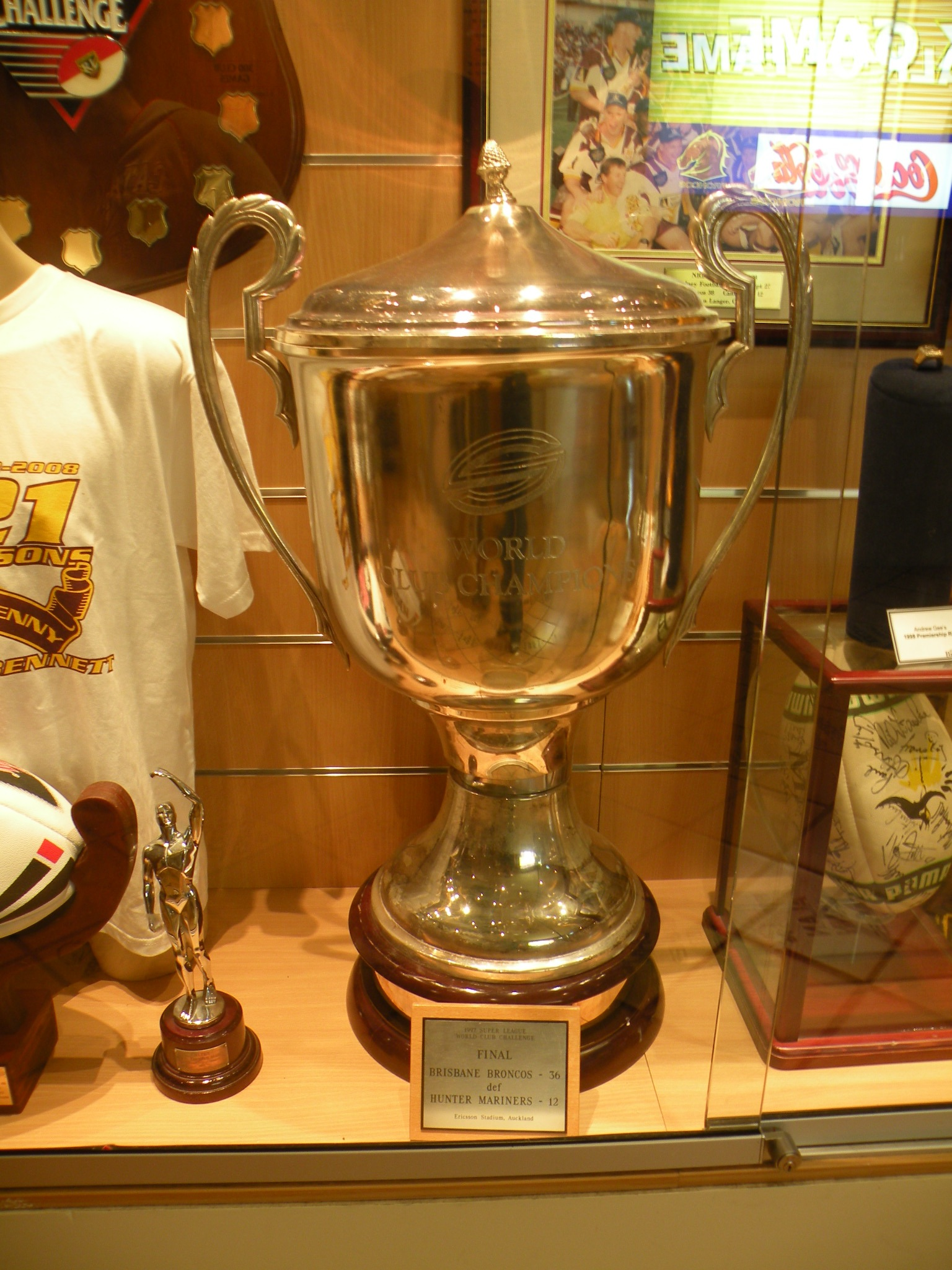
1997 tournament trophy

Returning to a one-off match between the League champions in 1998, a World Club Challenge as a show-piece fixture at Ellis Park in Johannesburg was mooted. However this did not eventuate.

=== 2000–2014: Regular competition ===
When it was resurrected in 2000, the World Club Challenge was once more played between the winners of the premierships in AUNZ and The UK. During this period it was contested annually in the United Kingdom in late January or early February, before the commencement National Rugby League season and the Super League season. Over this period Super League teams dominated the tournament winning 7 of 9 matches, and this led one Australian commentator to deride the competition, citing the British refusal to play the game outside of the UK, the effects of jet lag on an Australian team who arrived in England only a couple of days before the game, and wintry conditions as reasons for Australian team's poor performance. In addition, the games were being played at the beginning of the new season instead of at the end of the previous season, so the rosters of both sides had normally changed considerably, therefore the teams that took the field were not the ones that won the respective premierships. For these reasons, it was viewed as merely a pre-season warm up game by most Australasian teams and fans.

Since the 2009 tournament, its popularity has increased with stronger crowds and also with Australian teams taking the concept more seriously, Australian teams were arriving earlier to acclimatize the players and often organising warm up games with other super league sides and this created a much stronger showing and improved results. This also led to an increased movement to having the tournament staged in Australia. During this period, the matches were fixtured in late February, still before the commencement of the National Rugby League season but in the early stages of the new Super League season.

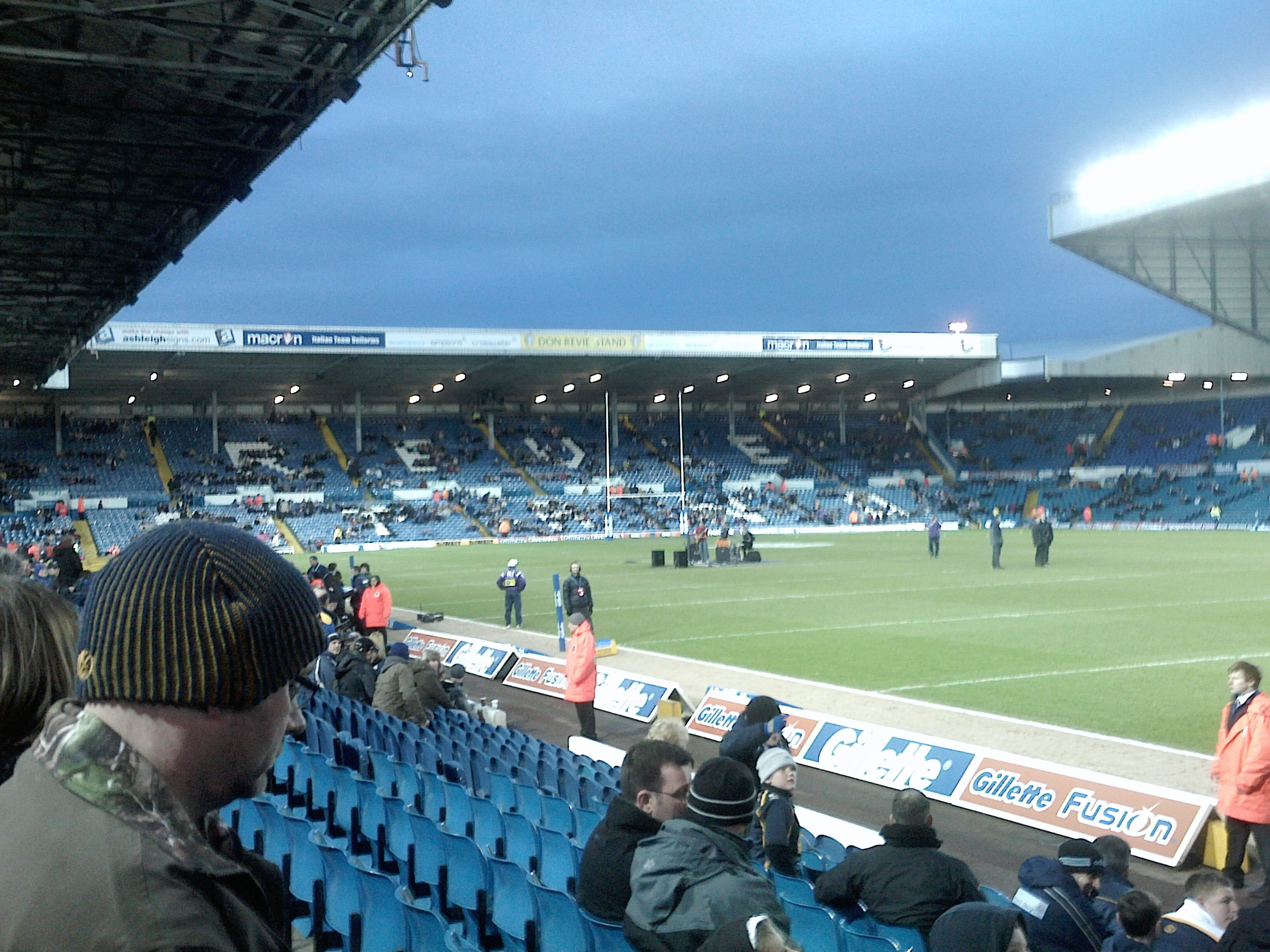
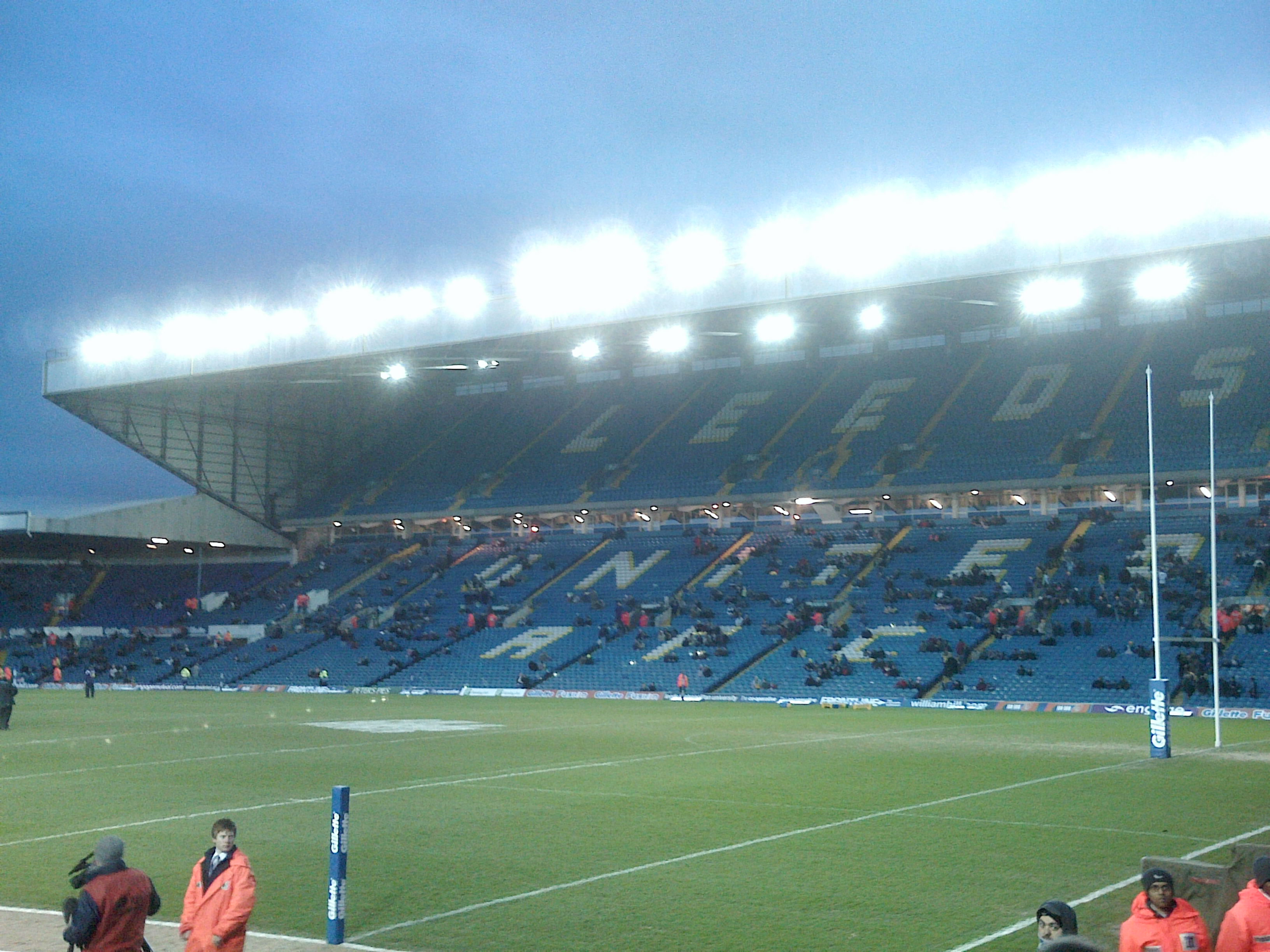
Elland Road prior to the 2010 edition of the tournament.

In mid-2012, a working party was established to look into the feasibility of conducting the match in either a neutral or Australian venue and also looking into the possibility of expanding the tournament. In February 2013, the changes to the tournament were gaining momentum with the NRL and Super League agreeing to begin alternating the World Club Challenge tournament between the UK and Australia. These changes were finally confirmed in November 2013, with both parties agreeing that the 2014 World Club Challenge would be the first held in Australia since 1994. In addition, commencing in 2015, the tournament would also be expanded to six teams. The World Club Challenge return to Australia in 2014 was a success with a solid crowd numbers of over 31,000, with the Sydney Roosters defeating the Wigan Warriors 36–14. During the game, Sydney's Michael Jennings became the first player to score a hat trick of tries in a World Club Challenge.

=== 2015–2017: World Club Series ===
In September 2014, it was announced that the World Club Challenge name would be changed to the World Club Series with six clubs participating – 3 from each league. The first iteration took place between 20 and 22 February 2015, and featured three matches, the first and second essentially being two exhibition games and the final game being for the Championship trophy between the two respective premiers as in previous years.

In 2017, the format was reduced to four teams, with the NRL citing tight schedules, distant travel and long seasons as an impediment to their participation in the Series. After the NRL negotiated with the Brisbane Broncos, it was decided that they would represent the NRL in an exhibition match vs Warrington Wolves prior to the usual Challenge game between the Super League Champions Wigan Warriors and Cronulla Sutherland Sharks, maintaining the overall Series concept. 2017 would be Super League's first victory since the series began, with Warrington winning 27–18 against Brisbane, and Wigan beating Cronulla 22–6.

In October 2017, it was suggested that the 2018 Series could be scrapped completely based on the top Australian teams reluctance to travel to the UK for the 2017 series which resulted in the Series being scaled back to two games only. In particular the second game of the 2017 series only featured an invited team from the NRL. In addition, the 2017 Rugby League World Cup being played in Australia at the end of 2017, meant that the preseasons for Australian teams was going to be unusually short ahead of the 2018 season and therefore did not want to make the trip to England for the 2018 series. The Melbourne Storm (2017 NRL Premiers) in particular, were reluctant to travel meaning the series was in danger of cancellation for the first time since the 1990s as it is the Storm that was playing in the World Club Challenge.

In June 2017, the Super League announced that the Australian city of Wollongong would host the first ever Super League game outside Europe. Wigan Warriors will "host" Hull F.C. in the game at WIN Stadium on Saturday, 10 February. In addition and as part of this trip to Australia, Wigan and Hull would also play two exhibition games against South Sydney Rabbitohs and St George Illawarra Dragons respectively. These were separately arranged fixtures and not considered part of the World Club Series.

=== 2018–2020: Return to single match format ===
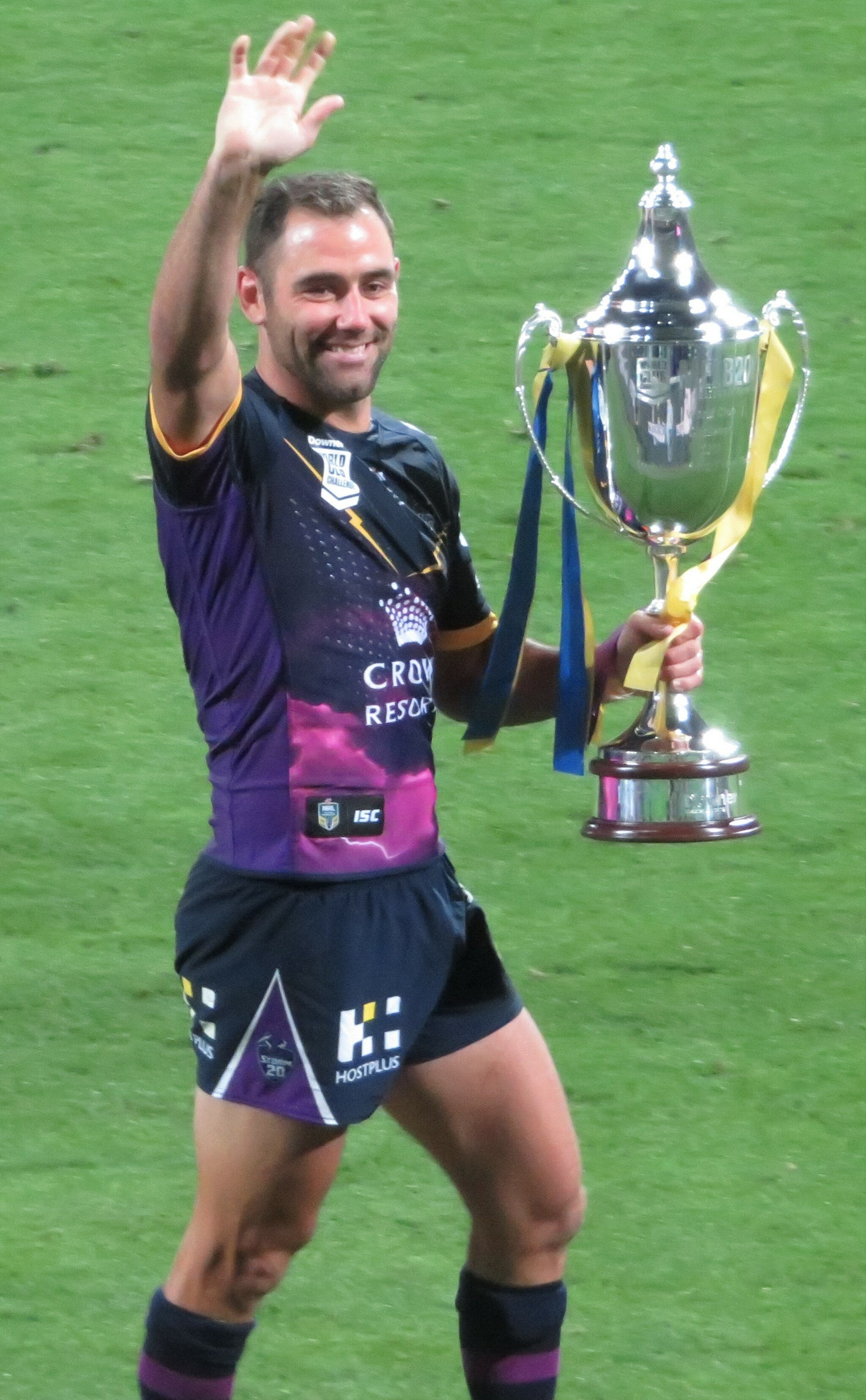
Melbourne Storm's Cameron Smith with the trophy following the club's 2018 victory

On 14 November 2017, it was confirmed that Leeds Rhinos would travel to Australia to play Melbourne Storm at AAMI Park in Melbourne on 16 February 2018, and that the World Club Challenge would return to a one-game format for the first time since 2014. The Storm defeated Leeds 38–4 to become World Club Champions for 2018 and also became the first club to hold the NRL Minor Premiership, NRL Premiership and World Club Challenge at the same time since the Sydney Roosters in 2014.

On 22 February 2020, the Sydney Roosters became the first team to win back to back World Club Challenges, defeating St Helens 20–12 in the process. They also overtook Wigan in most challenges won with five.

=== 2021–2022: COVID-19 cancellations ===
On 20 November 2020 it was announced that the 2021 World Club challenge, which was due to be played between Melbourne Storm and St Helens would be postponed until late in 2021 owing to the push back of seasons due to the COVID-19 pandemic and the ongoing pandemic itself preventing overseas travel. However, due to the continuing issues surrounding the COVID-19 pandemic, the clash between St Helens and Melbourne was completely cancelled.

In October 2021, St Helens chairman Eamonn McManus said that while he hoped the 2022 version of this fixture could go ahead against the Penrith Panthers, he acknowledged it would be “very difficult” to arrange. In November 2021 Penrith Panthers CEO Brian Fletcher said Penrith would only play if the game was played at BlueBet Stadium the Panthers home ground at the time because they did not want to send their team to play against St Helens in England. St Helens coach Kristian Woolfe agreed on the condition that Penrith pay for the fares of the St Helens team. Penrith refused and the match was cancelled for this reason. The year's competition was ultimately also cancelled.

=== 2023–present: Return ===
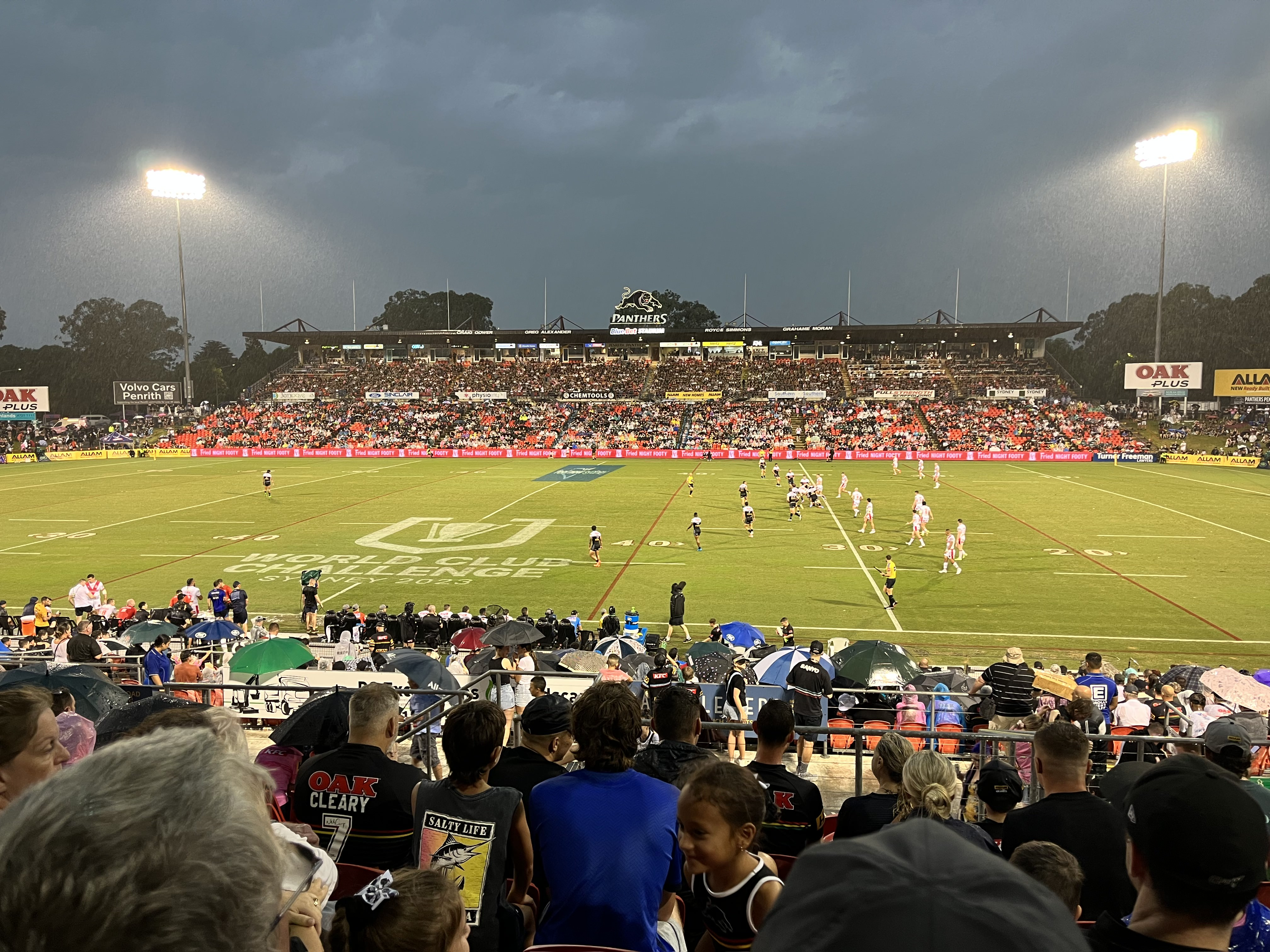
2023 World Club Challenge

On 9 November 2022, it was announced that the World Club Challenge would make its return and be staged in Australia at BlueBet Stadium. Back-to-back NRL champions Penrith Panthers would host St Helens, the Super League champions for four consecutive years. The match took place on Saturday February 18, with kick-off at 7am (GMT). For the first time in the history of the competition the match went to golden point extra time after a dramatic finale meant that the match was tied 12–12 at the full time hooter. St Helens scored the winning point with a Lewis Dodd drop goal, a shock win to become the first Super League side to win the Challenge in Australia since 1994. This was also the worst attended game in 23 years, falling nearly 10,000 short of the capacity of the BlueBet Stadium, the previous low attendance also involved St Helens which was held at the DW Stadium in Wigan, with only the 1997 game having a lower attendance.

Penrith would win a third consecutive NRL title while St Helens' monopoly ended as Wigan Warriors won 2023 Super League Grand Final to set up a rematch from the 1991 World Club Challenge. Penrith would again fail in capturing an inaugural World Club Challenge win in 2024 as they were defeated 16–12 at a sellout DW Stadium with 24,091 in attendance. By Winning, Wigan set a record equalling tally of five World Club Challenge wins along with Sydney Roosters.

Ahead of the 2024 NRL Grand Final, reports began circulating that the 2025 World Club Challenge was at risk of cancellation as teams that could potentially qualify (Penrith Panthers, Warrington Wolves, and Wigan Warriors) would have difficulty arranging travel to either the UK or Australia, then to the United States, with the usual date of the tournament being close to that of the 2025 Rugby League Las Vegas event.

On 9 October 2024, 2024 NRL Grand Final champions Penrith Panthers confirmed to the NRL that they would not play the match before the start of the domestic seasons citing player welfare as the issue stating that their players were delaying their mandated leave to play in the 2024 Rugby League Pacific Championships and 2024 Samoa rugby league tour of England thus not allowing players to have an adequate preseason before the World Club Challenge. The club stated that it was open to working with the NRL for a solution to play the match, but would not play the match as things currently stand stood. 2024 Super League Grand Final champions Wigan Warriors were commitment to the fixture. The match was never played.

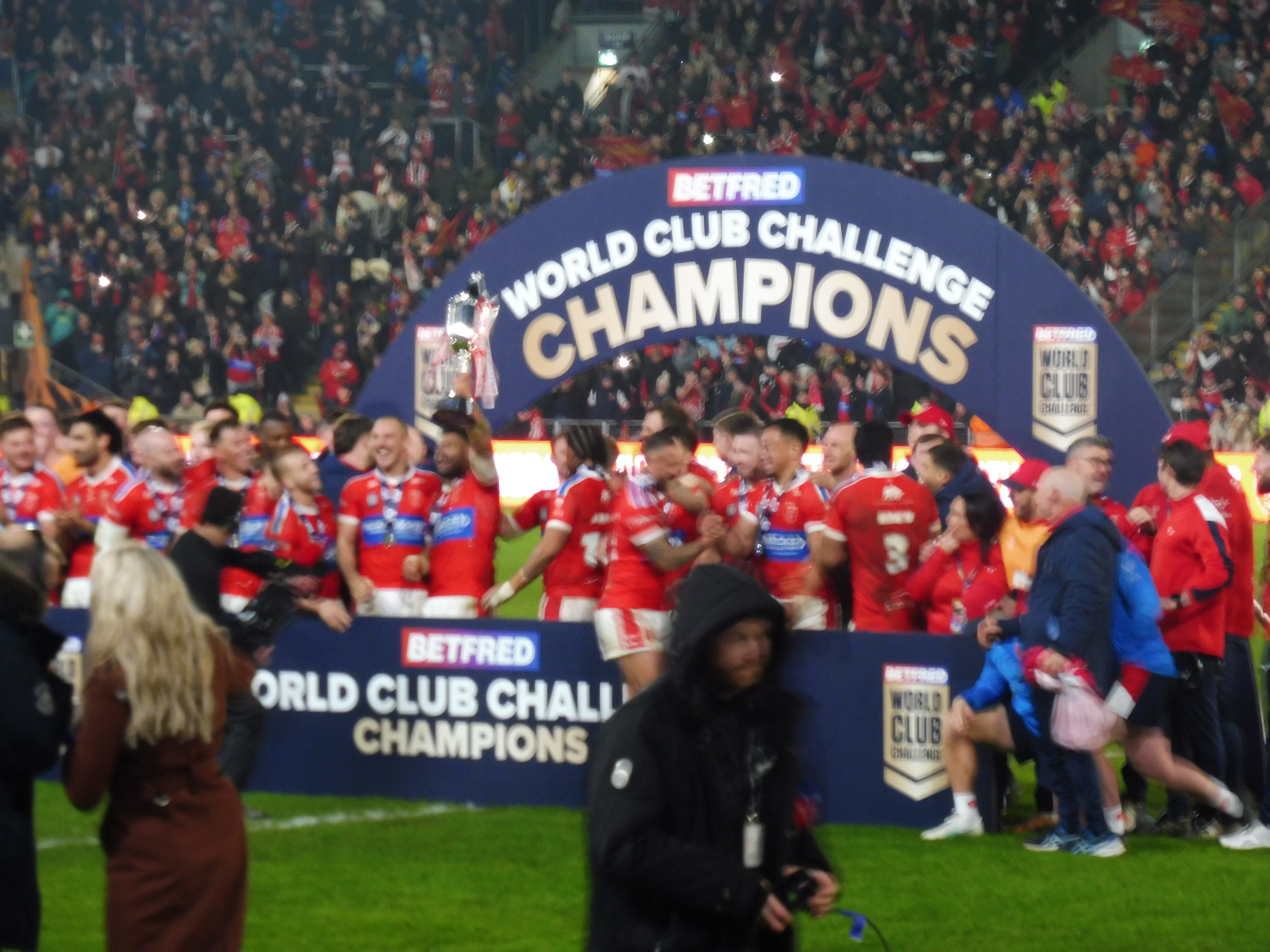
Hull Kingston Rovers after winning the 2026 World Club Challenge

After the 2025 Rugby League Las Vegas event was held, talks emerged in regards to the World Club Challenge being played at Vegas the following year; however, this did not come to fruition. The following month, Rhodri Jones, CEO of Rugby League Commercial, stated both Super League and the NRL had committed to staging the event in 2026. Following Brisbane Broncos's victory in the 2025 NRL Grand Final, NRL CEO Andrew Abdo confirmed the staging of the 2026 event with details to be worked out following the result of the 2025 Super League Grand Final. Following Hull Kingston Rovers's victory in the Super League Grand Final, talks emerged that the 2026 World Club Challenge had been penciled in for 21 February with Brisbane travelling to Hull FC's MKM Stadium for the game. The game was later confirmed for 19 February.

== Results ==
=== List of matches ===
20 teams have competed in the World Club Challenge with 13 teams being successful and being crowned world champions. Sydney Roosters and Wigan Warriors have currently jointly won more finals than any other team with five wins (Roosters first title was prior to the club's name change from Eastern Suburbs).

Season	Champions	Score	Runners-up	Venue	Attendance
1976	(Australia) Eastern Suburbs	25 – 2	(England) St Helens	(Australia) Sydney Cricket Ground	26,865
1987	(England) Wigan Warriors	8 – 2	(Australia) Manly Sea Eagles	(England) Central Park	36,895
1989	(England) Widnes Vikings	30 – 18	(Australia) Canberra Raiders	(England) Old Trafford	30,786
1991	(England) Wigan Warriors (2)	21 – 4	(Australia) Penrith Panthers	(England) Anfield	20,152
1992	(Australia) Brisbane Broncos	22 – 8	(England) Wigan Warriors	(England) Central Park	17,764
1994	(England) Wigan Warriors (3)	20 – 14	(Australia) Brisbane Broncos	(Australia) Queensland Sport and Athletics Centre	54,220
1997 Final	(Australia) Brisbane Broncos (2)	36 – 12	(Australia) Hunter Mariners	(New Zealand) Mount Smart Stadium	10,300
2000	(Australia) Melbourne Storm	44 – 6	(England) St Helens	(England) DW Stadium	13,394
2001	(England) St Helens	20 – 18	(Australia) Brisbane Broncos	(England) Reebok Stadium	16,041
2002	(England) Bradford Bulls	41 – 26	(Australia) Newcastle Knights	(England) Kirklees Stadium	21,113
2003	(Australia) Sydney Roosters (2)	38 – 0	(England) St Helens	(England) Reebok Stadium	19,807
2004	(England) Bradford Bulls (2)	22 – 4	(Australia) Penrith Panthers	(England) Kirklees Stadium	18,962
2005	(England) Leeds Rhinos	39 – 32	(Australia) Canterbury Bulldogs	(England) Elland Road	37,028
2006	(England) Bradford Bulls (3)	30 – 10	(Australia) Wests Tigers	(England) Kirklees Stadium	19,207
2007	(England) St Helens (2)	18 – 14	(Australia) Brisbane Broncos	(England) Reebok Stadium	23,207
2008	(England) Leeds Rhinos (2)	11 – 4	(Australia) Melbourne Storm	(England) Elland Road	33,204
2009	(Australia) Manly Sea Eagles	28 – 20	(England) Leeds Rhinos	(England) Elland Road	32,569
2010	(Australia) ~~Melbourne Storm~~ (Note: Melbourne were stripped of title due to salary cap breaches.)	18 – 10	(England) Leeds Rhinos	(England) Elland Road	27,697
2011	(Australia) St George Illawarra Dragons	21 – 15	(England) Wigan Warriors	(England) DW Stadium	24,268
2012	(England) Leeds Rhinos (3)	26 – 12	(Australia) Manly Sea Eagles	(England) Headingley Stadium	21,062
2013	(Australia) Melbourne Storm (2)	18 – 14	(England) Leeds Rhinos	(England) Headingley Stadium	20,400
2014	(Australia) Sydney Roosters (3)	36 – 14	(England) Wigan Warriors	(Australia) Sydney Football Stadium	31,515
2015	(Australia) South Sydney Rabbitohs	39 – 0	(England) St Helens	(England) Langtree Park	17,980
2016	(Australia) North Queensland Cowboys	38 – 4	(England) Leeds Rhinos	(England) Headingley Stadium	19,778
2017	(England) Wigan Warriors (4)	22 – 6	(Australia) Cronulla Sharks	(England) DW Stadium	21,011
2018	(Australia) Melbourne Storm (3)	38 – 4	(England) Leeds Rhinos	(Australia) Melbourne Rectangular Stadium	19,062
2019	(Australia) Sydney Roosters (4)	20 – 8	(England) Wigan Warriors	(England) DW Stadium	21,331
2020	(Australia) Sydney Roosters (5)	20 – 12	(England) St Helens	(England) Totally Wicked Stadium	16,108
2021	Cancelled due to the COVID-19 pandemic ( (England) St Helens vs (Australia) Melbourne Storm).				
2022	Cancelled due to the COVID-19 pandemic ( (England) St Helens vs (Australia) Penrith Panthers).				
2023	(England) St Helens (3)	13 – 12	(Australia) Penrith Panthers	(Australia) Penrith Stadium	13,783
2024	(England) Wigan Warriors (5)	16 – 12	(Australia) Penrith Panthers	(England) DW Stadium	24,091
2025	Cancelled due to team withdrawal ( (England) Wigan Warriors vs (Australia) Penrith Panthers).				
2026	(England) Hull Kingston Rovers	30–24	(Australia) Brisbane Broncos	(England) MKM Stadium	24,600
2027	(Australia) Sydney Roosters	–	(England) Wakefield Trinity	TBA	

=== Team performance ===
Team	Winners	Runners-up	Years won	Years runner-up
Wigan Warriors	5	4	1987, 1991, 1994, 2017, 2024	1992, 2011, 2014, 2019
Sydney Roosters	5	0	1976, 2003, 2014, 2019, 2020	N/A
Leeds Rhinos	3	5	2005, 2008, 2012	2009, 2010, 2013, 2016, 2018
St Helens	3	5	2001, 2007, 2023	1976, 2000, 2003, 2015, 2020
Melbourne Storm	3	1	2000, ~~2010~~, 2013, 2018	2008
Bradford Bulls	3	0	2002, 2004, 2006	N/A
Brisbane Broncos	2	4	1992, 1997	1994, 2001, 2007, 2026
Manly Sea Eagles	1	2	2009	1987, 2012
Widnes Vikings	1	0	1989	N/A
St. George Illawarra Dragons	1	0	2011	N/A
South Sydney Rabbitohs	1	0	2015	N/A
North Queensland Cowboys	1	0	2016	N/A
Hull Kingston Rovers	1	0	2026	N/A
Penrith Panthers	0	4	N/A	1991, 2004, 2023, 2024
Canberra Raiders	0	1	N/A	1989
Hunter Mariners	0	1	N/A	1997
Newcastle Knights	0	1	N/A	2002
Canterbury Bulldogs	0	1	N/A	2005
Wests Tigers	0	1	N/A	2006
Cronulla Sharks	0	1	N/A	2017

=== Wins by competition ===
League	Winners	Years won
(Australia) National Rugby League / NSWRL / Super League	14	1976, 1992, 1997, 2000, 2003, 2009, 2011, 2013, 2014, 2015, 2016, 2018, 2019, 2020
(England) Super League / First Division	16	1987, 1989, 1991, 1994, 2001, 2002, 2004, 2005, 2006, 2007, 2008, 2012, 2017, 2023, 2024, 2026

=== The Treble ===
The Treble, in Australian rugby league, involves winning the World Club Challenge, Grand Final, and Minor Premiership within the same season.

NB: In British rugby league, "the treble" refers to winning the Super League Grand Final, League Leaders Shield, and Challenge Cup, however British teams are still listed here who qualify by the Australian definition.

To date the teams that have held the three titles at once are as follows:

Club	Year (Note: For most of its history, the World Club Challenge has been played as a curtain opener to the following NRL and Super League seasons, therefore the year shown may not be the same as the year the competition was won.)	Titles
Eastern Suburbs Roosters	1975	1975 NSWRFL Grand Final, 1975 Minor Premiership, 1976 World Club Challenge
Wigan Warriors	1987	1986–87 RFL First Division, 1987 Premiership, 1987 World Club Challenge
Widnes Vikings	1989	1988–89 RFL First Division, 1989 Premiership, 1989 World Club Challenge
Brisbane Broncos	1992	1992 NSWRL Grand Final, 1992 Minor Premiership, 1992 World Club Challenge
Wigan Warriors (2)	1994	1993–94 RFL First Division, 1994 Premiership, 1994 World Club Challenge
Brisbane Broncos (2)	1997	1997 Super League Grand Final, 1997 Super League Minor Premiership, 1997 World Club Championship Final
Bradford Bulls	2001	2001 Super League Grand Final, 2001 League Leaders' Shield, 2002 World Club Challenge
Bradford Bulls (2)	2003	2003 Super League Grand Final, 2003 League Leaders' Shield, 2004 World Club Challenge
Leeds Rhinos	2004	2004 Super League Grand Final, 2004 League Leaders' Shield, 2005 World Club Challenge
St Helens	2006	2006 Super League Grand Final, 2006 League Leaders' Shield, 2007 World Club Challenge
St. George Illawarra Dragons	2010	2010 NRL Grand Final, 2010 Minor Premiership, 2011 World Club Challenge
Sydney Roosters (2)	2013	2013 NRL Grand Final, 2013 Minor Premiership, 2014 World Club Challenge
Melbourne Storm	2017	2017 NRL Grand Final, 2017 Minor Premiership, 2018 World Club Challenge
Sydney Roosters (3)	2018	2018 NRL Grand Final, 2018 Minor Premiership, 2019 World Club Challenge
St Helens (2)	2022	2022 Super League Grand Final, 2022 League Leaders' Shield, 2023 World Club Challenge
Wigan Warriors (3)	2023	2023 Super League Grand Final, 2023 League Leaders' Shield, 2024 World Club Challenge
Hull Kingston Rovers	2025	2025 Super League Grand Final, 2025 League Leaders' Shield, 2026 World Club Challenge

== Venues ==
	City	Stadium	Years
1	(England) Wigan	DW Stadium	2000, 2011, 2017, 2019, 2024
2	(England) Leeds	Elland Road	2005, 2008, 2009, 2010
3	(England) Bolton	Macron Stadium	2001, 2003, 2007
3	(England) Huddersfield	Kirklees Stadium	2002, 2004, 2006
3	(England) Leeds	Headingley Stadium	2012, 2013, 2016
6	(England) Wigan	Central Park	1987, 1992
6	(England) St. Helens	Langtree Park	2015, 2020
8	(Australia) Sydney	Sydney Cricket Ground	1976
8	(England) Manchester	Old Trafford	1989
8	(England) Liverpool	Anfield	1991
8	(Australia) Brisbane	QEII Stadium	1994
8	(New Zealand) Auckland	Mount Smart Stadium	1997
8	(Australia) Sydney	Sydney Football Stadium	2014
8	(Australia) Melbourne	Melbourne Rectangular Stadium	2018
8	(Australia) Penrith	Penrith Stadium	2023
8	(England) Hull	MKM Stadium	2026

=== Attendance ===
==== Highest ====
Year	City	Stadium	Attendance
1994	Brisbane	QEII Stadium	54,220

==== Lowest ====
Year	City	Stadium	Attendance
1997	Auckland	Mount Smart Stadium	12,000

== Sponsors ==
The World Club Challenge has been sponsored sporadically since its formation.

Period	Sponsor	Name
1987–1991	Foster's	Foster's World Club Challenge
1992–1993	None	World Club Challenge
1994–1996	MMI	MMI World Club Challenge
1997	VISA	VISA World Club Championship
2000	Kellogg's	Kellogg's World Club Challenge
2001–2004	None	World Club Challenge
2005–2009	Carnegie	Carnegie World Club Challenge
2010	Gillette	Gillette World Club Challenge
2011	Probiz	Probiz World Club Challenge
2012	Heinz Big Soup	Heinz Big Soup World Club Challenge
2013	Probiz	Probiz World Club Challenge
2014–2015	None	World Club Challenge
2016–2017	Dacia	Dacia World Club Challenge
2018	Downer	Downer World Club Challenge
2019–2020	Betfred	Betfred World Club Challenge
2023	None	World Club Challenge
2024–2026	Betfred	Betfred World Club Challenge
