= List of New South Wales Country Origin rugby league team players =

This article lists all rugby league footballers who have represented the New South Wales Country rugby league team in matches played against New South Wales City since 1987 under the origin selection criteria. Players are listed according to the date of their debut game.

== List of players ==
Cap No.	Name	Debut Year	Club
1.	Peter Sterling	1987	Parramatta Eels
2.	John Allanson	1987	Western Suburbs Magpies
3.	David Boyle	1987	South Sydney Rabbitohs
4.	Noel Cleal	1987	Manly Warringah Sea Eagles
5.	Mal Cochrane	1987	Manly Warringah Sea Eagles
6.	Les Davidson	1987	South Sydney Rabbitohs
7.	Andrew Farrar	1987	Canterbury-Bankstown Bulldogs
8.	Ron Gibbs	1987	Manly Warringah Sea Eagles
9.	Garry Jack	1987	Balmain Tigers
10.	Brian Johnston	1987	St. George Dragons
11.	Peter Kelly	1987	Canterbury-Bankstown Bulldogs
12.	Mark Laurie	1987	Parramatta Eels
13.	Chris Mortimer	1987	Canterbury-Bankstown Bulldogs
14.	Laurie Daley	1988	Canberra Raiders
15.	John Dorahy	1988	North Sydney Bears
16.	Paul Dunn	1988	Canterbury-Bankstown Bulldogs
17.	John Ferguson	1988	Canberra Raiders
18.	Ashley Gilbert	1988	Canberra Raiders
19.	Chris O'Sullivan	1988	Canberra Raiders
20.	Steve Roach	1988	Balmain Tigers
21.	Royce Simmons	1988	Penrith Panthers
22.	David Trewhella	1988	Sydney Roosters
23.	Paul Upfield	1988	Illawarra Steelers
24.	Jason Alchin	1989	Canterbury-Bankstown Bulldogs
25.	Todd Anderson	1989	South Newcastle
26.	Tony Butterfield	1989	Newcastle Knights
27.	Ivan Henjak	1989	Canberra Raiders
28.	Bruce McGuire	1989	Balmain Tigers
29.	Gavin Miller	1989	Cronulla-Sutherland Sharks
30.	Mark Sargent	1989	Newcastle Knights
31.	Ricky Walford	1989	St. George Dragons
32.	Gary Wurth	1989	Newcastle Knights
33.	Scott Carter	1990	Newcastle Knights
34.	Jason Edwards	1990	Toronto Workers
35.	Michael Erickson	1990	Parramatta Eels
36.	David Gillespie	1990	Canterbury-Bankstown Bulldogs
37.	Dean Lance	1990	Canberra Raiders
38.	Michael Potter	1990	St. George Dragons
39.	Steve Carter	1991	Penrith Panthers
40.	Wayne Collins	1991	St. George Dragons
41.	Marc Glanville	1991	Newcastle Knights
42.	Ashley Gordon	1991	Newcastle Knights
43.	Scott Gourley	1991	St. George Dragons
44.	Glenn Lazarus	1991	Canberra Raiders
45.	Ewan McGrady	1991	Canterbury-Bankstown Bulldogs
46.	Paul Martin	1991	Canberra Raiders
47.	Brett Rodwell	1991	Illawarra Steelers
48.	Ian Russell	1991	Illawarra Steelers
49.	Ricky Stuart	1991	Canberra Raiders
50.	Rod Wishart	1991	Illawarra Steelers
51.	Bradley Clyde	1992	Canberra Raiders
52.	Simon Gillies	1992	Canterbury-Bankstown Bulldogs
53.	Paul Harragon	1992	Newcastle Knights
54.	Robbie McCormack	1992	Newcastle Knights
55.	Paul McGregor	1992	Illawarra Steelers
56.	Brett Mullins	1992	Canberra Raiders
57.	John Simon	1992	Illawarra Steelers
58.	David Barnhill	1993	St. George Dragons
59.	Nigel Gaffey	1993	Sydney Roosters
60.	Luke Goodwin	1993	Canterbury-Bankstown Bulldogs
61.	Darren Willis	1993	Western Suburbs Magpies
62.	Jason Croker	1994	Canberra Raiders
63.	Ken Nagas	1994	Canberra Raiders
64.	Dean Pay	1994	Canterbury-Bankstown Bulldogs
65.	Matthew Ryan	1994	Canterbury-Bankstown Bulldogs
66.	John Cross	1995	Illawarra Steelers
67.	Andrew Johns	1995	Newcastle Knights
68.	Nik Kosef	1995	Manly Warringah Sea Eagles
69.	Ciriaco Mescia	1995	Western Suburbs Magpies
70.	Adam Muir	1995	Newcastle Knights
71.	Matt Seers	1995	North Sydney Bears
72.	Darren Treacy	1995	Newcastle Knights
73.	David Woods	1995	Parramatta Eels
74.	Brandon Costin	1996	Western Suburbs Magpies
75.	David Furner	1996	Canberra Raiders
76.	Matthew Johns	1996	Newcastle Knights
77.	Danny Lee	1996	Cronulla-Sutherland Sharks
78.	Darren Albert	1997	Newcastle Knights
79.	Bill Dunn	1997	Western Suburbs Magpies
80.	Matthew Gidley	1997	Newcastle Knights
81.	William Kennedy	1997	Balmain Tigers
82.	Glenn Morrison	1997	Balmain Tigers
83.	Wayne Richards	1997	Newcastle Knights
84.	Nathan Blacklock	2001	St. George Illawarra Dragons
85.	Darren Britt	2001	Canterbury-Bankstown Bulldogs
86.	Danny Buderus	2001	Newcastle Knights
87.	Craig Fitzgibbon	2001	Sydney Roosters
88.	Chris Hicks	2001	Penrith Panthers
89.	Scott Hill	2001	Melbourne Storm
90.	Ian Hindmarsh	2001	Parramatta Eels
91.	Brett Kimmorley	2001	Northern Eagles
92.	Mark McLinden	2001	Canberra Raiders
93.	Jason Moodie	2001	Parramatta Eels
94.	Josh Perry	2001	Newcastle Knights
95.	Jason Ryles	2001	St. George Illawarra Dragons
96.	Steve Simpson	2001	Newcastle Knights
97.	Timana Tahu	2001	Newcastle Knights
98.	Luke Bailey	2002	St. George Illawarra Dragons
99.	Jamie Feeney	2002	Canterbury-Bankstown Bulldogs
100.	Mark Hughes	2002	Newcastle Knights
101.	John Morris	2002	Newcastle Knights
102.	Matt Parsons	2002	Newcastle Knights
103.	Luke Patten	2002	Canterbury-Bankstown Bulldogs
104.	Andrew Ryan	2002	Parramatta Eels
105.	Paul Stringer	2002	South Sydney Rabbitohs
106.	Simon Woolford	2002	Canberra Raiders
107.	Daniel Abraham	2003	Newcastle Knights
108.	Trent Barrett	2003	St. George Illawarra Dragons
109.	Matt Cooper	2003	St. George Illawarra Dragons
110.	Ben Kennedy	2003	Newcastle Knights
111.	Jamie Lyon	2003	Parramatta Eels
112.	Willie Mason	2003	Canterbury-Bankstown Bulldogs
113.	Ryan O'Hara	2003	Canberra Raiders
114.	David Peachey	2003	Cronulla-Sutherland Sharks
115.	Shaun Timmins	2003	St. George Illawarra Dragons
116.	Peter Cusack	2004	Sydney Roosters
117.	Kurt Gidley	2004	Newcastle Knights
118.	Matt King	2004	Melbourne Storm
119.	Brent Kite	2004	St. George Illawarra Dragons
120.	Luke Priddis	2004	Penrith Panthers
121.	Amos Roberts	2004	Penrith Panthers
122.	Preston Campbell	2005	Penrith Panthers
123.	Luke Covell	2005	Cronulla-Sutherland Sharks
124.	Ben Creagh	2005	St. George Illawarra Dragons
125.	Ben Hornby	2005	St. George Illawarra Dragons
126.	Anthony Tupou	2005	Sydney Roosters
127.	Brett Finch	2006	Sydney Roosters
128.	Anthony Laffranchi	2006	Wests Tigers
129.	Adam MacDougall	2006	South Sydney Rabbitohs
130.	Anthony Quinn	2006	Newcastle Knights
131.	Mitchell Sargent	2006	North Queensland Cowboys
132.	Brett White	2006	Melbourne Storm
133.	Dean Widders	2006	Parramatta Eels
134.	Greg Bird	2007	Cronulla-Sutherland Sharks
135.	Ben Cross	2007	Melbourne Storm
136.	Phil Graham	2007	Canberra Raiders
137.	Josh Morris	2007	St. George Illawarra Dragons
138.	Clint Newton	2007	Newcastle Knights
139.	Brett Stewart	2007	Manly Warringah Sea Eagles
140.	Todd Carney	2008	Canberra Raiders
141.	Ben Harris	2008	North Queensland Cowboys
142.	Chris Heighington	2008	Wests Tigers
143.	Nathan Hindmarsh	2008	Parramatta Eels
144.	Brett Kearney	2008	Cronulla-Sutherland Sharks
145.	Joel Monaghan	2008	Canberra Raiders
146.	Glenn Stewart	2008	Manly Warringah Sea Eagles
147.	Terry Campese	2009	Canberra Raiders
148.	Michael Ennis	2009	Canterbury-Bankstown Bulldogs
149.	James McManus	2009	Newcastle Knights
150.	Jarrod Mullen	2009	Newcastle Knights
151.	Justin Poore	2009	St. George Illawarra Dragons
152.	Beau Scott	2009	St. George Illawarra Dragons
153.	Jamie Soward	2009	St. George Illawarra Dragons
154.	Alan Tongue	2009	Canberra Raiders
155.	Michael Weyman	2009	St. George Illawarra Dragons
156.	Luke Burt	2010	Parramatta Eels
157.	Josh Dugan	2010	Canberra Raiders
158.	Jamal Idris	2010	Canterbury-Bankstown Bulldogs
159.	Tom Learoyd-Lahrs	2010	Canberra Raiders
160.	Michael Robertson	2010	Manly Warringah Sea Eagles
161.	Kade Snowden	2010	Cronulla-Sutherland Sharks
162.	Dean Young	2010	St. George Illawarra Dragons
163.	Michael Gordon	2011	Penrith Panthers
164.	Ryan Hinchcliffe	2011	Melbourne Storm
165.	Chris Houston	2011	Newcastle Knights
166.	Dan Hunt	2011	St. George Illawarra Dragons
167.	Trent Merrin	2011	St. George Illawarra Dragons
168.	Tim Moltzen	2011	Wests Tigers
169.	Matt Prior	2011	St. George Illawarra Dragons
170.	Joel Thompson	2011	Canberra Raiders
171.	Aiden Tolman	2011	Canterbury-Bankstown Bulldogs
172.	Akuila Uate	2011	Newcastle Knights
173.	Luke Douglas	2012	Gold Coast Titans
174.	Blake Ferguson	2012	Canberra Raiders
175.	Josh McCrone	2012	Canberra Raiders
176.	Brett Morris	2012	St. George Illawarra Dragons
177.	Tariq Sims	2012	North Queensland Cowboys
178.	Boyd Cordner	2013	Sydney Roosters
179.	Josh Jackson	2013	Canterbury-Bankstown Bulldogs
180.	Ryan James	2013	Gold Coast Titans
181.	James Maloney	2013	Sydney Roosters
182.	Alex McKinnon	2013	Newcastle Knights
183.	Jack Wighton	2013	Canberra Raiders
184.	Sam Williams	2013	Canberra Raiders
185.	Adam Docker	2014	Penrith Panthers
186.	Dale Finucane	2014	Canterbury-Bankstown Bulldogs
187.	Kevin Gordon	2014	Gold Coast Titans
188.	David Mead	2014	Gold Coast Titans
189.	Mitch Rein	2014	St. George Illawarra Dragons
190.	Tyrone Roberts	2014	Newcastle Knights
191.	Robbie Rochow	2014	Newcastle Knights
192.	Paul Vaughan	2014	Canberra Raiders
193.	Jack Bird	2015	Cronulla-Sutherland Sharks
194.	Jarrod Croker	2015	Canberra Raiders
195.	Tyson Frizell	2015	St. George Illawarra Dragons
196.	Euan Aitken	2016	St. George Illawarra Dragons
197.	Mitchell Aubusson	2016	Sydney Roosters
198.	Shannon Boyd	2016	Canberra Raiders
199.	Jack De Belin	2016	St. George Illawarra Dragons
200.	Rory Kostjasyn	2016	North Queensland Cowboys
201.	Kane Linnett	2016	North Queensland Cowboys
202.	Jordan McLean	2016	Melbourne Storm
203.	Isaah Yeo	2016	Penrith Panthers
204.	Daniel Alvaro	2017	Parramatta Eels
205.	Cheyse Blair	2017	Melbourne Storm
206.	Damien Cook	2017	South Sydney Rabbitohs
207.	Anthony Don	2017	Gold Coast Titans
208.	Adam Elliott	2017	Canterbury-Bankstown Bulldogs
209.	Brian Kelly	2017	Manly Warringah Sea Eagles
210.	Kyle Turner	2017	South Sydney Rabbitohs
211.	Cody Walker	2017	South Sydney Rabbitohs
212.	Connor Watson	2017	Sydney Roosters

== See also ==
- List of New South Wales City Origin rugby league team players
