= List of New South Wales City Origin rugby league team players =

This article lists all rugby league footballers who have represented the New South Wales City rugby league team in matches played against New South Wales Country since 1987 under the origin selection criteria. Players are listed according to the date of their debut game.

== List of players ==
Cap No.	Name	Debut Year	Club
1.	Wayne Pearce	1987	Balmain Tigers
2.	Jonathan Docking	1987	Cronulla-Sutherland Sharks
3.	Benny Elias	1987	Balmain Tigers
4.	Eric Grothe Sr.	1987	Parramatta Eels
5.	Des Hasler	1987	Manly-Warringah Sea Eagles
6.	Pat Jarvis	1987	Canterbury-Bankstown Bulldogs
7.	Brett Kenny	1987	Parramatta Eels
8.	Terry Lamb	1987	Canterbury-Bankstown Bulldogs
9.	Paul Langmack	1987	Canterbury-Bankstown Bulldogs
10.	Mark McGaw	1987	Cronulla-Sutherland Sharks
11.	Michael O'Connor	1987	Manly-Warringah Sea Eagles
12.	Paul Sironen	1987	Balmain Tigers
13.	Peter Tunks	1987	Canterbury-Bankstown Bulldogs
14.	Greg Alexander	1988	Penrith Panthers
15.	Phil Blake	1988	South Sydney Rabbitohs
16.	Phil Daley	1988	Manly-Warringah Sea Eagles
17.	Andrew Ettingshausen	1988	Cronulla-Sutherland Sharks
18.	Steve Folkes	1988	Canterbury-Bankstown Bulldogs
19.	Cliff Lyons	1988	Manly-Warringah Sea Eagles
20.	Ian Roberts	1988	South Sydney Rabbitohs
21.	Wayne Chisholm	1989	South Sydney Rabbitohs
22.	Bradley Clyde	1989	Canberra Raiders
23.	Mario Fenech	1989	South Sydney Rabbitohs
24.	Greg Florimo	1989	North Sydney Bears
25.	Chris Johns	1989	Brisbane Broncos
26.	Glenn Lazarus	1989	Canberra Raiders
27.	Graham Lyons	1989	South Sydney Rabbitohs
28.	Glenn Ryan	1989	Manly-Warringah Sea Eagles
29.	John Cartwright	1990	Penrith Panthers
30.	Brad Mackay	1990	St. George Dragons
31.	Ricky Stuart	1990	Canberra Raiders
32.	Geoff Toovey	1990	Manly-Warringah Sea Eagles
33.	Paul Clarke	1991	Penrith Panthers
34.	Brad Fittler	1991	Penrith Panthers
35.	Mark Geyer	1991	Penrith Panthers
36.	Craig Salvatori	1991	Sydney Roosters
37.	Paul Smith	1991	Penrith Panthers
38.	Joe Thomas	1991	Western Suburbs Magpies
39.	Colin Van Der Voort	1991	Penrith Panthers
40.	Tim Brasher	1992	Balmain Tigers
41.	David Fairleigh	1992	North Sydney Bears
42.	Graham Mackay	1992	Penrith Panthers
43.	Jeff Orford	1992	Sydney Roosters
44.	Brian Smith	1992	Balmain Tigers
45.	Jim Dymock	1993	Canterbury-Bankstown Bulldogs
46.	Terry Hill	1993	Western Suburbs Magpies
47.	Craig Polla-Mounter	1993	Canterbury-Bankstown Bulldogs
48.	Jacin Sinclair	1993	Balmain Tigers
49.	Jason Taylor	1993	Western Suburbs Magpies
50.	Dallas Weston	1993	Parramatta Eels
51.	Mark Carroll	1994	Manly-Warringah Sea Eagles
52.	Craig Field	1994	South Sydney Rabbitohs
53.	Jamie Ainscough	1995	Newcastle Knights
54.	Robbie Beckett	1995	Penrith Panthers
55.	Glenn Grief	1995	Western Suburbs Magpies
56.	Craig Hancock	1995	Manly-Warringah Sea Eagles
57.	Ken McGuinness	1995	Western Suburbs Magpies
58.	Steve Menzies	1995	Manly-Warringah Sea Eagles
59.	Adam Ritson	1995	Cronulla-Sutherland Sharks
60.	Jim Serdaris	1995	Western Suburbs Magpies
61.	Peter Jorgensen	1996	Sydney Roosters
62.	Anthony Mundine	1996	St. George Dragons
63.	Aaron Raper	1996	Parramatta Eels
64.	Luke Ricketson	1996	Sydney Roosters
65.	Troy Stone	1996	St. George Dragons
66.	Andrew Walker	1996	Sydney Roosters
67.	Michael Buettner	1997	North Sydney Bears
68.	Daniel Gartner	1997	Manly-Warringah Sea Eagles
69.	John Hopoate	1997	Manly-Warringah Sea Eagles
70.	Shane Rigon	1997	Sydney Roosters
71.	Darren Senter	1997	Balmain Tigers
72.	Josh Stuart	1997	North Sydney Bears
73.	Colin Ward	1997	St. George Dragons
74.	Colin Best	2001	Cronulla-Sutherland Sharks
75.	Jason Cayless	2001	Parramatta Eels
76.	Brad Drew	2001	Parramatta Eels
77.	Adam Dykes	2001	Cronulla-Sutherland Sharks
78.	Hazem El Masri	2001	Canterbury-Bankstown Bulldogs
79.	Ben Galea	2001	Wests Tigers
80.	Jody Gall	2001	Penrith Panthers
81.	Mark Gasnier	2001	St. George Illawarra Dragons
82.	Brett Hodgson	2001	Parramatta Eels
83.	Anthony Minichiello	2001	Sydney Roosters
84.	Matt Orford	2001	Melbourne Storm
85.	Ian Rubin	2001	Sydney Roosters
86.	Lance Thompson	2001	St. George Illawarra Dragons
87.	Barry Ward	2001	Canterbury-Bankstown Bulldogs
88.	Craig Wing	2001	Sydney Roosters
89.	Braith Anasta	2002	Canterbury-Bankstown Bulldogs
90.	Michael De Vere	2002	Brisbane Broncos
91.	Matt Geyer	2002	Melbourne Storm
92.	Craig Gower	2002	Penrith Panthers
93.	Nick Graham	2002	Cronulla-Sutherland Sharks
94.	Robbie Kearns	2002	Melbourne Storm
95.	Nathan Long	2002	Northern Eagles
96.	Kevin McGuinness	2002	Wests Tigers
97.	Mark O'Meley	2002	Canterbury-Bankstown Bulldogs
98.	Brent Sherwin	2002	Canterbury-Bankstown Bulldogs
99.	John Skandalis	2002	Wests Tigers
100.	Joel Clinton	2003	Penrith Panthers
101.	Bryan Fletcher	2003	South Sydney Rabbitohs
102.	Solomon Haumono	2003	Manly-Warringah Sea Eagles
103.	Jason Stevens	2003	Cronulla-Sutherland Sharks
104.	Ryan Cross	2004	Sydney Roosters
105.	Sam Harris	2004	Manly-Warringah Sea Eagles
106.	Luke Lewis	2004	Penrith Panthers
107.	Mark Riddell	2004	St. George Illawarra Dragons
108.	Shane Rodney	2004	Penrith Panthers
109.	Luke Rooney	2004	Penrith Panthers
110.	Eric Grothe Jr.	2005	Parramatta Eels
111.	Jason King	2005	Manly-Warringah Sea Eagles
112.	Reni Maitua	2005	Canterbury-Bankstown Bulldogs
113.	Luke O'Donnell	2005	North Queensland Cowboys
114.	Anthony Watmough	2005	Manly-Warringah Sea Eagles
115.	Robbie Farah	2006	Wests Tigers
116.	Paul Gallen	2006	Cronulla-Sutherland Sharks
117.	Ryan Hoffman	2006	Melbourne Storm
118.	David Simmons	2006	Cronulla-Sutherland Sharks
119.	Trent Waterhouse	2006	Penrith Panthers
120.	Dean Collis	2007	Wests Tigers
121.	Bryce Gibbs	2007	Wests Tigers
122.	Jarryd Hayne	2007	Parramatta Eels
123.	Mark Minichiello	2007	Gold Coast Titans
124.	Ben Pomeroy	2007	Cronulla-Sutherland Sharks
125.	Reece Williams	2007	Cronulla-Sutherland Sharks
126.	Ray Cashmere	2008	North Queensland Cowboys
127.	Brett Delaney	2008	Gold Coast Titans
128.	Corey Hughes	2008	Canterbury-Bankstown Bulldogs
129.	Feleti Mateo	2008	Parramatta Eels
130.	Mitchell Pearce	2008	Sydney Roosters
131.	Chad Robinson	2008	Parramatta Eels
132.	John Sutton	2008	South Sydney Rabbitohs
133.	Peter Wallace	2008	Brisbane Broncos
134.	Keith Galloway	2009	Wests Tigers
135.	Michael Jennings	2009	Penrith Panthers
136.	Wade McKinnon	2009	New Zealand Warriors
137.	Shane Shackleton	2009	Sydney Roosters
138.	Luke Stuart	2009	South Sydney Rabbitohs
139.	David Williams	2009	Manly-Warringah Sea Eagles
140.	Beau Champion	2010	South Sydney Rabbitohs
141.	Lachlan Coote	2010	Penrith Panthers
142.	Tim Grant	2010	Penrith Panthers
143.	Trent Hodkinson	2010	Manly-Warringah Sea Eagles
144.	Kris Keating	2010	Parramatta Eels
145.	Chris Lawrence	2010	Wests Tigers
146.	Tim Mannah	2010	Parramatta Eels
147.	Joel Reddy	2010	Parramatta Eels
148.	Adam Cuthbertson	2011	St. George Illawarra Dragons
149.	Simon Dwyer	2011	Wests Tigers
150.	Liam Fulton	2011	Wests Tigers
151.	William Hopoate	2011	Manly-Warringah Sea Eagles
152.	Nathan Merritt	2011	South Sydney Rabbitohs
153.	Tom Symonds	2011	Sydney Roosters
154.	Mitchell Allgood	2012	Parramatta Eels
155.	Jamie Buhrer	2012	Manly-Warringah Sea Eagles
156.	Joseph Leilua	2012	Sydney Roosters
157.	Corey Payne	2012	Canterbury-Bankstown Bulldogs
158.	Steve Turner	2012	Canterbury-Bankstown Bulldogs
159.	Aaron Woods	2012	Wests Tigers
160.	Andrew Fifita	2013	Cronulla-Sutherland Sharks
161.	Wade Graham	2013	Cronulla-Sutherland Sharks
162.	Nathan Peats	2013	South Sydney Rabbitohs
163.	Adam Reynolds	2013	South Sydney Rabbitohs
164.	Curtis Sironen	2013	Wests Tigers
165.	Jorge Taufua	2013	Manly-Warringah Sea Eagles
166.	James Tedesco	2013	Wests Tigers
167.	Tony Williams	2013	Canterbury-Bankstown Bulldogs
168.	Beau Falloon	2014	Gold Coast Titans
169.	David Klemmer	2014	Canterbury-Bankstown Bulldogs
170.	Michael Lichaa	2014	Cronulla-Sutherland Sharks
171.	Darcy Lussick	2014	Parramatta Eels
172.	Matt Moylan	2014	Penrith Panthers
173.	Josh Reynolds	2014	Canterbury-Bankstown Bulldogs
174.	Daniel Tupou	2014	Sydney Roosters
175.	Dylan Walker	2014	South Sydney Rabbitohs
176.	Blake Austin	2015	Canberra Raiders
177.	Waqa Blake	2015	Penrith Panthers
178.	Reagan Campbell-Gillard	2015	Penrith Panthers
179.	Jason Clark	2015	South Sydney Rabbitohs
180.	Kane Evans	2015	Sydney Roosters
181.	Joseph Paulo	2015	Parramatta Eels
182.	Tyrone Peachey	2015	Penrith Panthers
183.	James Roberts	2015	Gold Coast Titans
184.	Nathan Brown	2016	South Sydney Rabbitohs
185.	Bryce Cartwright	2016	Penrith Panthers
186.	Aaron Gray	2016	South Sydney Rabbitohs
187.	Clinton Gutherson	2016	Parramatta Eels
188.	Leilani Latu	2016	Penrith Panthers
189.	Kyle Lovett	2016	Wests Tigers
190.	Josh Mansour	2016	Penrith Panthers
191.	Ryan Matterson	2016	Sydney Roosters
192.	David Nofoaluma	2016	Wests Tigers
193.	Aidan Sezer	2016	Canberra Raiders
194.	Chad Townsend	2016	Cronulla-Sutherland Sharks
195.	Josh Addo-Carr	2017	Melbourne Storm
196.	Nathan Cleary	2017	Penrith Panthers
197.	David Gower	2017	Parramatta Eels
198.	Jake Marketo	2017	St. George Illawarra Dragons
199.	Cameron McInnes	2017	St. George Illawarra Dragons
200.	Pauli Pauli	2017	Newcastle Knights
201.	Nathan Ross	2017	Newcastle Knights
202.	Hame Sele	2017	St. George Illawarra Dragons
203.	James Tamou	2017	Penrith Panthers

== See also ==
- List of New South Wales Country Origin rugby league team players
