= Josh Stuart =

Australian rugby league footballer

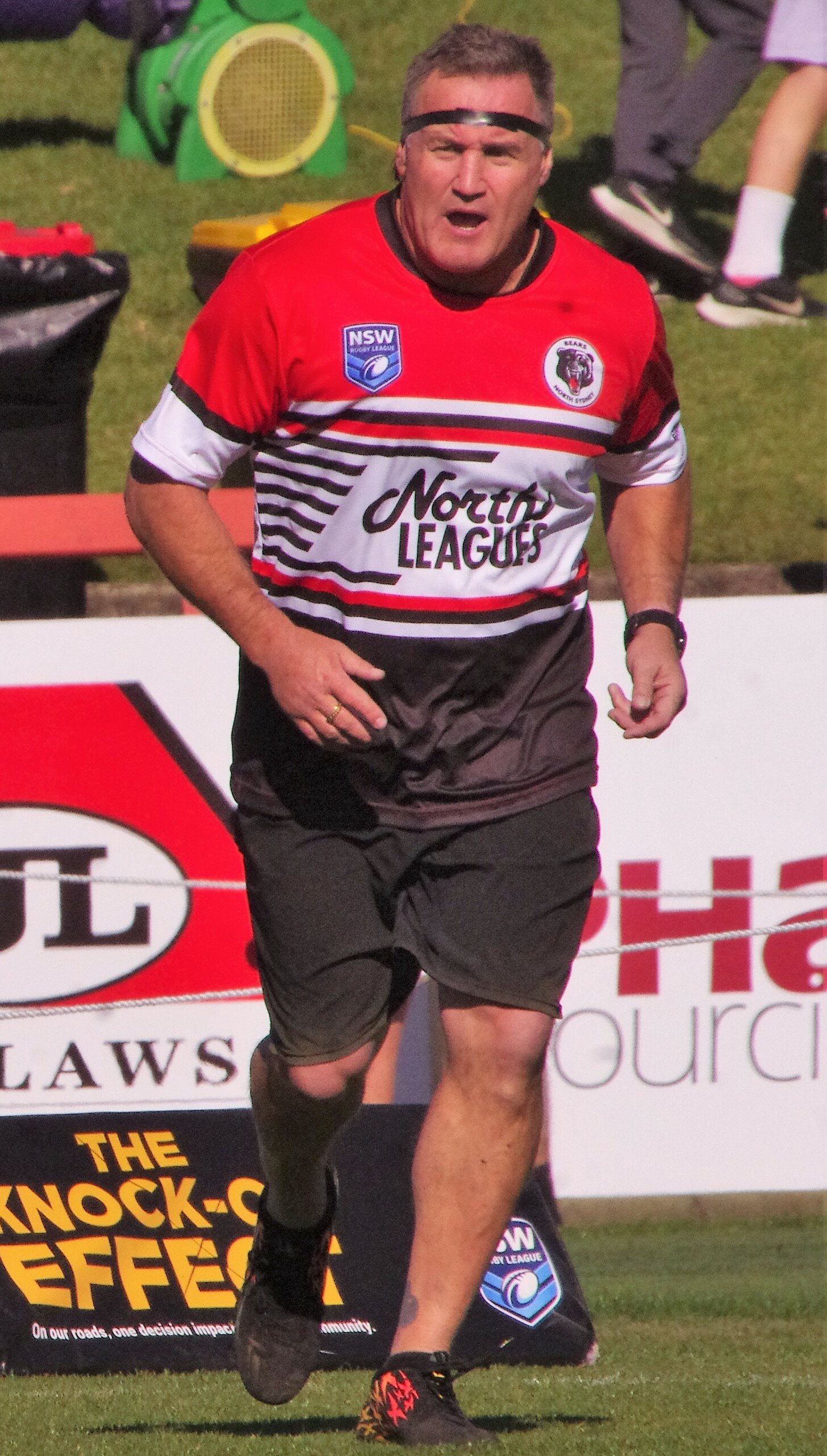

Personal information
- Full name: Joshua Stuart
- Born: 20 December 1972 (age 52)

Playing information
- Position: Prop
Club
Years	Team	Pld	T	G	FG	P
1993–99	North Sydney	111	5	0	0	20
2000–01	Northern Eagles	22	0	0	0	0
	Total	133	5	0	0	20
Representative
Years	Team	Pld	T	G	FG	P
1997	NSW City	1	0	0	0	0
- Relatives: Ivan Cleary (brother-in-law); Jason Death (brother-in-law); Nathan Cleary (nephew)

Josh Stuart (born 20 December 1972) is an Australian former professional rugby league footballer who played for the North Sydney Bears and Northern Eagles in the National Rugby League.

== Early life ==
Stuart grew up in Sydney, attending St Paul's College, Manly, during which time he was chosen to represent the Australian Schoolboys team in both 1990 and 1991.

== Playing career ==
A prop, he started his first-grade career at North Sydney in 1993, going on to make 111 appearances, including six finals. Following round 10 of the 1998 NRL season, Stuart was suspended for 12 matches due to two high tackles.

Stuart played in North Sydney's final ever match as a first grade side which Norths won against North Queensland by a score of 28–18 in Townsville.

When North Sydney merged with Manly to form the Northern Eagles, he spent two seasons with the new club, playing 22 first-grade games before retiring after the 2001 season.

At representative level, Stuart played for NSW City in the 1997 City vs Country Origin match.

He is the brother-in-law of former players Ivan Cleary and Jason Death, who are married to his sisters Rebecca and Yvette respectively.
