= Glenn Ryan (rugby league) =

Australian rugby league footballer

Personal information
- Full name: Glenn Andrew Ryan
- Born: 8 December 1962 (age 62); Sydney, New South Wales

Playing information
- Position: Second-row
Club
| Years | Team | Pld | T | G | FG | P |
|---|---|---|---|---|---|---|
| 1983–90 | Manly-Warringah | 86 | 6 | 0 | 0 | 24 |
| 1987 | →Hull Kingston Rovers | 19 | 2 | 0 | 0 | 8 |
| 1991 | Canberra Raiders | 3 | 0 | 0 | 0 | 0 |
| | Total | 108 | 8 | 0 | 0 | 32 |
Representative
| Years | Team | Pld | T | G | FG | P |
| 1989 | NSW City | 1 | 0 | 0 | 0 | 0 |

Glenn Andrew Ryan (born 8 December 1962) is an Australian former professional rugby league footballer who played for Manly-Warringah and the Canberra Raiders in the NSWRL competition.

== Background ==
Ryan was born in Sydney, New South Wales, Australia.

== Playing career ==
Ryan debuted for Manly in 1983 and started on the bench in that year's grand final loss to Parramatta, in what was his sixth first-grade appearance.

A second-rower, he became a regular fixture in the Manly team in 1984 and 1985, before injury struck. He missed the entire 1986 season with a groin injury and made only three first-grade appearances in 1987 missing out on playing in the premiership winning team that year, after which he spent the off season in England playing for Hull Kingston Rovers.

Ryan, who in 1989 represented NSW City in the annual City vs Country Origin fixture, continued playing for Manly until 1990.

He joined Canberra in 1991 and after only one season left to captain-coach local club Tuggeranong.
