= Todd Anderson =

Todd Anderson may refer to

- Todd Anderson (footballer)
- J. Todd Anderson, storyboard artist
- Todd Anderson, a fictional character in Dead Poets Society
