= Jason Edwards (rugby league) =

Australian rugby league footballer (c. 1969–2022)

Personal information
- Born: c. 1969
- Died: 14 March 2022 (aged 52)

Playing information
- Position: Wing
Club
Years	Team	Pld	T	G	FG	P
1991–92	Newcastle Knights	5	1	0	0	4
Representative
Years	Team	Pld	T	G	FG	P
1990	NSW Country	1	4	0	0	16
- Source: As of 6 February 2019

Jason Edwards (c. 1969 – 14 March 2022) was an Australian professional rugby league footballer who played in the 1990s. He played for the Newcastle Knights from 1991 to 1992. He played for Country Origin in 1990. Edwards died on 14 March 2022, at the age of 52.
