= New South Wales rugby league team records =

== State of Origin ==
This is a list of records in the State of Origin series for New South Wales.

=== Individual records ===
==== Most capped (20+ games) ====
Games	Player	Era
31	Brad Fittler	1990–1996, 1998–2001, 2004
27	Andrew Ettingshausen	1987–1994, 1996, 1998
26	James Tedesco	2016–2024, 2026
24	Paul Gallen	2006–2016
23	Laurie Daley	1989–1996, 1998–1999
23	Andrew Johns	1995–2005
23	Jarryd Hayne	2007–2014, 2017
22	Rod Wishart	1990–1998
21	Tim Brasher	1992–2000
21	Danny Buderus	2002–2008
20	Nathan Cleary	2018–2026
20	Isaah Yeo	2020–2026
20	Paul Harragon	1992–1998
20	Steve Menzies	1995–1998, 2001–2002, 2005–2006
Correct to Game 3, 2023 and includes exhibition match

==== Most points (50+ points) ====
Points	Player	Tries	Goals	FG
132	Nathan Cleary	5	56	0
129	Michael O'Connor	11	42	1
94	Andrew Johns	4	37	4
82	Ryan Girdler	7	27	0
70	James Maloney	2	31	0
66	Rod Wishart	5	23	0
Correct to Game 3, 2026 and includes exhibition match

==== Most tries (7+ tries) ====
Tries	Player	Games
11	Brian To'o	15
11	Josh Addo-Carr	15
11	Michael O'Connor	19
11	Jarryd Hayne	23
9	Tom Trbojevic	10
8	Anthony Minichiello	11
8	Timana Tahu	12
8	James Tedesco	23
8	Brad Fittler	31
7	Latrell Mitchell	8
7	Ryan Girdler	8
7	Andrew Ettingshausen	27
Correct to Game 3, 2025 and includes exhibition match

==== Individual appearance records ====
Record	Player	Detail	When
Youngest player	Brad Fittler	18 years, 114 days	Game 2, 1990
Oldest player	John Ferguson	34 years, 348 days	Game 3, 1989
First QLD-based NSW player	Chris Johns	Brisbane Broncos	Game 1, 1989
Most consecutive appearances	James Tedesco	23 Games	Game 3, 2016 to Game 1, 2024
Most appearances as captain	Brad Fittler	17 games	1994–1996, Games 1 & 2 1999, 2000, 2001
Most matches won as captain	Brad Fittler	8	1994–2001
Most series won as captain	Laurie Daley	4	1992–1994, 1997 (SL)
Correct to Game 3, 2018 and includes exhibition match

==== Individual scoring records ====
Record	Player	Detail	When
Most tries in a match	Chris Anderson	3	Game 3, 1983
Most tries in a match	Ryan Girdler	3	Game 3, 2000
Most tries in a match	Matt King	3	Game 3, 2005
Most tries in a match	Tom Trbojevic	3	Game 2, 2019, Game 1, 2021
Most tries in a match	Brian To'o	3	Game 2, 2025
Most goals in a match	Ryan Girdler	10	Game 3, 2000
Most points in a match	Ryan Girdler	32	Game 3, 2000
Most tries in a series	Ryan Girdler	5	2000
Most tries in a series	Brian To'o	5	2025
Most goals in a series	Ryan Girdler	16	2000
Most points in a series	Ryan Girdler	52	2000
Correct to Game 2, 2021 and includes exhibition match

=== Team records ===
Record	When
Team unchanged for entire series	Game 1 – Game 3, 1996 & 2017
3–0 series whitewash victories	1986, 1996, 2000
0–3 series whitewash losses	1988, 1989, 1995, 2010
Correct to Game 2, 2021 and includes exhibition match

=== Game records ===
==== Biggest wins (40+ margin) ====
Margin	Game
44	50 - 6, Game 1, 2021
40	56 - 16, Game 3 2000
Correct to Game 2, 2021 and includes exhibition match

==== Biggest losses (40+ margin) ====
Margin	Game
46	52 – 6, Game 3, 2015
Correct to Game 2, 2021 and includes exhibition match

=== Attendance records ===
The largest home attendances for NSW in State of Origin are:

- Sydney Cricket Ground (1982–1987) - 42,048 - Game 2, 1987
- Sydney Football Stadium (1988–1998) - 42,235 - Game 1, 1990
- Stadium Australia (1999–present) - 88,336 (Olympic Games configuration) - Game 2, 1999
  83,813 (post reconfiguration) - Game 3, 2014
- Melbourne Cricket Ground - 91,671 - Game 2, 2026

== Overall ==
This is a list of records for New South Wales dating back to 1908. It includes traditional interstate matches plus State of Origin records combined. Statistics from the Super League Tri-series are not included. There were no interstate matches played between 1916–1918 and 1942–1944 due to the World Wars.

=== Individual records ===
==== Most capped (20+ games) ====
Games	Player	Era
34	Wally Prigg	1929–1939
33	Graeme Langlands	1962–1975
31	Joe Pearce	1930–1941
31	Brad Fittler	1990–2001, 2004
30	Ray Stehr	1931–1941
27	Clive Churchill	1948–1957
27	Andrew Ettingshausen	1987–1996, 1998
26	Harry Wells	1952–1961
25	Jim Gibbs	1931–1938
25	Keith Holman	1950–1958
25	Ken Irvine	1959–1967
25	Mick Cronin	1973–1983 (19 interstate + 6 State of Origin)
24	Johnny Raper	1959–1968, 1970
24	Paul Gallen	2006–2016
23	Laurie Daley	1989–1996, 1998–1999
23	Andrew Johns	1995–2005
23	Jarryd Hayne	2007–2014, 2017
26	James Tedesco	2016–2024, 2026
22	Tommy Raudonikis	1971–1980 (21 interstate + 1 State of Origin)
22	Rod Wishart	1990–1998
21	Tim Brasher	1992–2000
21	Danny Buderus	2002–2008
20	Frank McMillan	1922–24, 1927, 1929–30, 1932–34
20	Noel Pidding	1947–48, 1950–54
20	Norm Provan	1954–61
20	Paul Harragon	1992–1998
20	Steve Menzies	1995–1998, 2001–2002, 2005–2006

==== Most points (90+ points) ====
Points	Player	Tries	Goals	Field goals
183	Mick Cronin	7	81	0
169	Noel Pidding	17	59	0
163	Les Johns	3	74	3
137	Graeme Langlands	19	40	0
132	Nathan Cleary	5	56	0
129	Michael O'Connor	11	42	1
125	Dave Brown	9	49	0
116	Dally Messenger	10	42	1
106	Keith Barnes	2	50	0
105	Harold Horder	23	18	0
95	Ken Irvine	29	4	0
94	Andrew Johns	4	37	4

==== Most tries (15+ tries) ====
Tries	Player	Games
29	Ken Irvine	25
25	Alan Ridley	18
23	Harold Horder	9
20	Keith Holman	25
19	Graeme Langlands	33
17	Noel Pidding	20

==== Individual scoring records ====
Record	Player	Detail	When
Most tries in a match	Sid Goodwin	6	Game 2, 1939
Most goals in a match	Greg Hawick	15	Game 3, 1957
Most points in a match	Dally Messenger	32	Game 1, 1911
Most points in a match	Ryan Girdler	32	Game 3, 2000
Most tries in a series	Harold Horder	10	1915
Most goals in a series	Noel Pidding	26	1954
Most points in a series	Dally Messenger	75	1911

=== Game records ===
==== Biggest wins (40+ margin) ====
Margin	Score	When
64	69 – 5	Game 3, 1957
56	65 – 9	Game 1, 1911
56	65 – 9	Game 1, 1912
49	49 – 0	Game 2, 1911
46	53 – 7	Game 2, 1963
44	53 – 9	Game 1, 1915
44	50 – 6	Game 1, 2021
43	43 – 0	Game 1, 1908
43	51 – 8	Game 3, 1935
41	54 – 13	Game 2, 1939
41	52 – 11	Game 1, 1940
40	56 – 16	Game 3, 2000

==== Biggest losses (40+ margin) ====
Margin	Score	When
46	52–6	Game 3, 2015
