= Paul Upfield =

Australian rugby league footballer

Personal information
- Full name: Paul Upfield
- Born: 22 January 1964 (age 61)

Playing information
- Position: Second-row, Lock, Five-eighth
Club
Years	Team	Pld	T	G	FG	P
1984–88	Illawarra Steelers	80	9	1	0	38
1989	St. George Dragons	5	0	0	0	0
1990–91	Balmain Tigers	7	1	0	0	4
	Total	92	10	1	0	42
Representative
Years	Team	Pld	T	G	FG	P
1988	NSW Country	1	0	0	0	0
- Source: As of 2 February 2023

Paul Upfield is an Australian former professional rugby league footballer who played in the 1980s and 1990s. He played for Illawarra, St. George and Balmain in the NSWRL competition.

== Playing career ==
An Illawarra junior, Upfield made his first grade debut in round 7 of the 1984 NSWRL season against Western Suburbs at Lidcombe Oval. Upfield scored a try on debut during a 13–10 loss. In 1988, Upfield was selected to represent NSW Country in the annual City vs Country Origin match. Upfield departed Illawarra at the end of 1988 having played 80 matches.

In 1989, Upfield joined St. George but only made five appearances for the first grade team before another transfer to Balmain where he played two seasons. Following his departure from Balmain, he played for Wagga Kangaroos and the Nowra Warriors. In 1994 he captain-coached Bathurst to a Group 10 premiership before returning to the Illawarra competition as a representative captain-coach.
