= David Gower (rugby league) =

Australian rugby league footballer

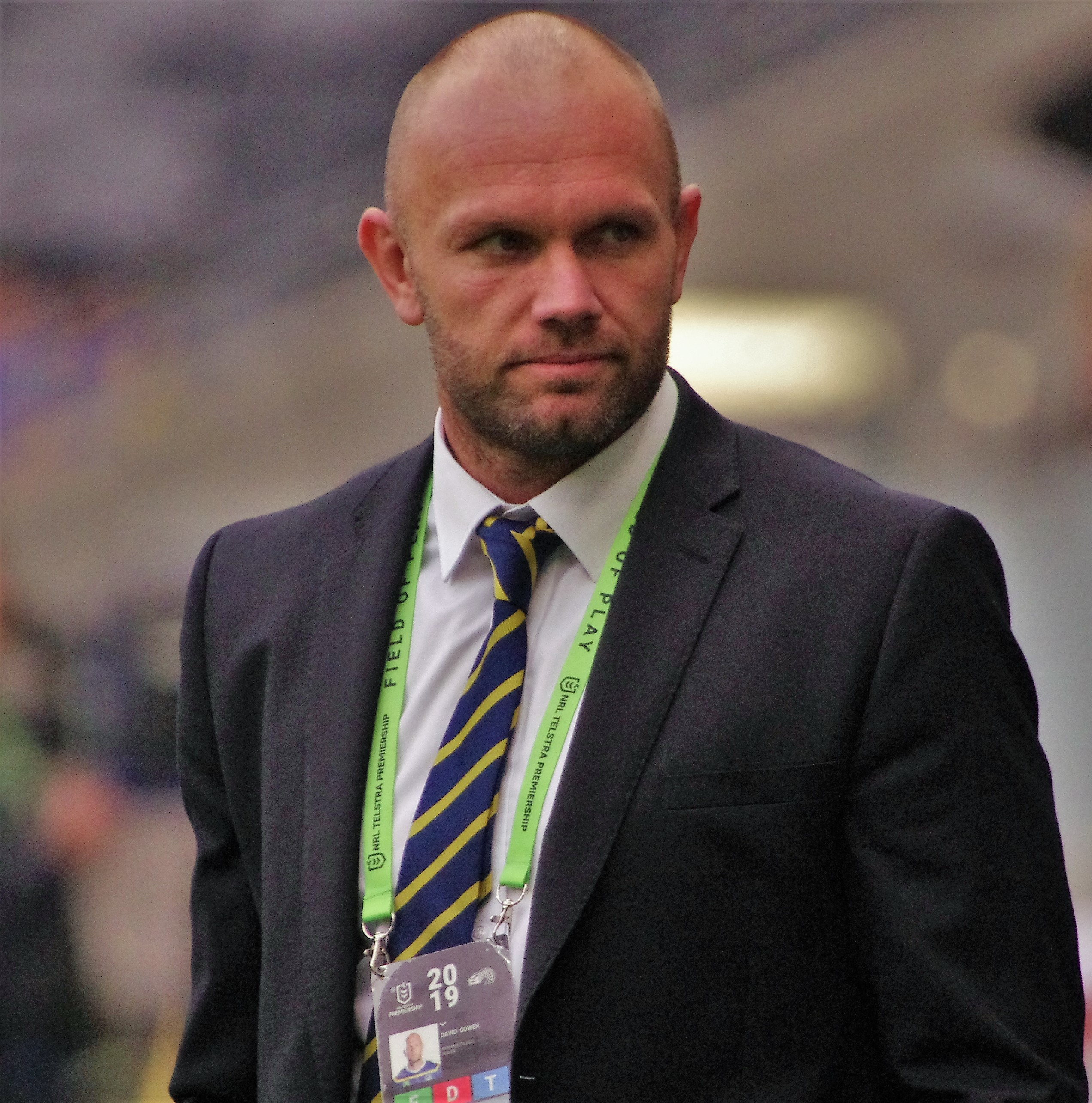

Personal information
- Full name: David Neil Gower
- Born: 30 September 1985 (age 41) Ryde, New South Wales, Australia
- Height: 190 cm (6 ft 3 in)
- Weight: 105 kg (16 st 7 lb)

Playing information
- Position: Second-row, Lock, Prop
Club
Years	Team	Pld	T	G	FG	P
2006–07	Salford City Reds	18	0	0	0	0
2009	Wests Tigers	1	0	0	0	0
2011–12	St. George Illawarra	7	0	0	0	0
2013	Manly Sea Eagles	12	0	0	0	0
2014–20	Parramatta Eels	101	6	0	0	24
	Total	139	6	0	0	24
Representative
Years	Team	Pld	T	G	FG	P
2017	NSW City	1	1	0	0	4
- Source: As of 19 November 2020

David Neil Gower (born 30 September 1985) is an Australian former professional rugby league footballer who plays as a prop, second-row and lock for the Hills District Bulls in the Ron Massey Cup competition.

He previously played for the Salford Red Devils in the Super League and the Wests Tigers, St. George Illawarra Dragons, the Manly-Warringah Sea Eagles and the Parramatta Eels in the NRL. He played for NSW City in 2017.

== Background ==
Gower was born in Ryde, New South Wales, Australia.

Gower played his junior football for the Holy Cross Rhinos before moving to England to play for the Salford Red Devils.

== Playing career ==
=== 2006–07: Salford City Reds ===
Between 2006 and 2007 he played in the Super League for the Salford City Reds.

=== 2009–10: Career with Wests Tigers ===
In 2009, Gower joined the Wests Tigers. In round 26 of the 2009 NRL season, he made his NRL debut against the Canterbury-Bankstown Bulldogs at the Sydney Football Stadium. At the end of the 2009 NRL season, Gower won the New South Wales Cup Player of the Year award.

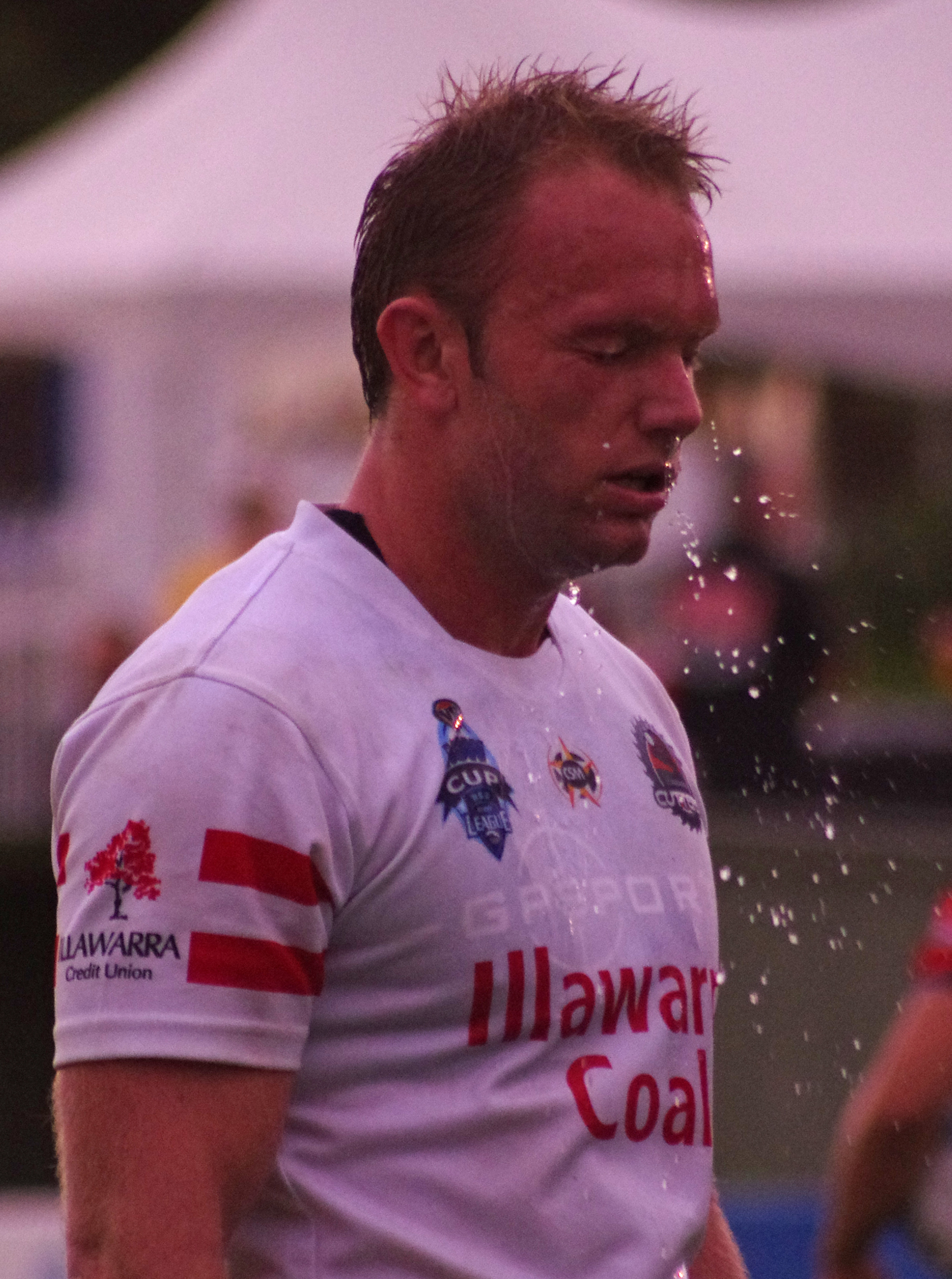
Gower playing for the Illawarra Cutters in 2012

At the end of 2010, after making the New South Wales Cup Team of the Year, Gower signed a 1-year contract with 2010 NRL Premiership-winning team, St. George Illawarra Dragons starting in the 2011 season.

=== 2011–12: Career with St. George Illawarra ===
After playing in five NRL matches for St. George Illawarra, his contract was extended at the end of the year.

At the end of the 2012 NRL season, Gower was named in the 2012 New South Wales Cup Team of the Year and also won the Illawarra Cutters' New South Wales Cup Player of the Year award, before signing a one-year contract with the Manly-Warringah Sea Eagles.

=== 2013: Career with Manly-Warringah ===
Gower played off the bench in Manly-Warringah's 2013 NRL Grand Final loss to the Sydney Roosters.

=== 2014–2020: Career with Parramatta ===
On 18 November 2013, Gower signed a one-year contract with the Parramatta Eels. After a successful season, Gower was rewarded with a two-year extension with the Eels until 2016. In 2017 whilst playing for Parramatta, Gower was selected to play for the City representative side in the annual and last ever City vs Country Origin match. On 2 June 2017, Gower broke his hand in Parramatta's 32–24 victory over The Auckland Warriors. On 13 September 2017, it was announced that Gower had signed a one-year contract extension to stay at Parramatta. In 2018, Gower made 16 appearances for Parramatta and scored one try as the club endured a horrid season on and off the field and claimed its 14th wooden spoon. On 30 October 2018, Gower signed a one-year contract extension keeping him at the club until the end of the 2019 NRL season.

In round 14 of the 2019 NRL season, Gower scored his first try of the season as Parramatta defeated Brisbane 38–10 at the new Western Sydney Stadium. Gower made 16 appearances for Parramatta in the 2019 NRL season which he announced would be his last. Gower's final game as a player was for Parramatta's feeder club the Wentworthville Magpies in the 2019 Canterbury Cup NSW grand final which Wentworthville lost 20–15 against Newtown at Bankwest Stadium. On 4 November 2019, it was announced that Gower had overturned his decision to retire and signed a one-year deal with Parramatta for the 2020 NRL season.

In round 9 of the 2020 NRL season, Gower made his 100th appearance for Parramatta against Newcastle. Parramatta would go on to win the match 10–4 at McDonald Jones Stadium. Gower made three appearances for Parramatta in the 2020 NRL season. On 12 October, Gower was released by the club as a player and took up a role with Parramatta in their educational and well-being team.

=== Hills District ===
On 12 February 2021, Gower signed a contract to play for Hills District in the Ron Massey Cup.

=== Ryde-Eastwood Hawks ===
In 2022, Gower signed a contract to play for Ryde-Eastwood Hawks in the 2022 Ron Massey Cup. He started off the bench in round 2 against the Blacktown Workers Sea Eagles.
