= Nathan Cleary =

Australian rugby league footballer (born 1997)

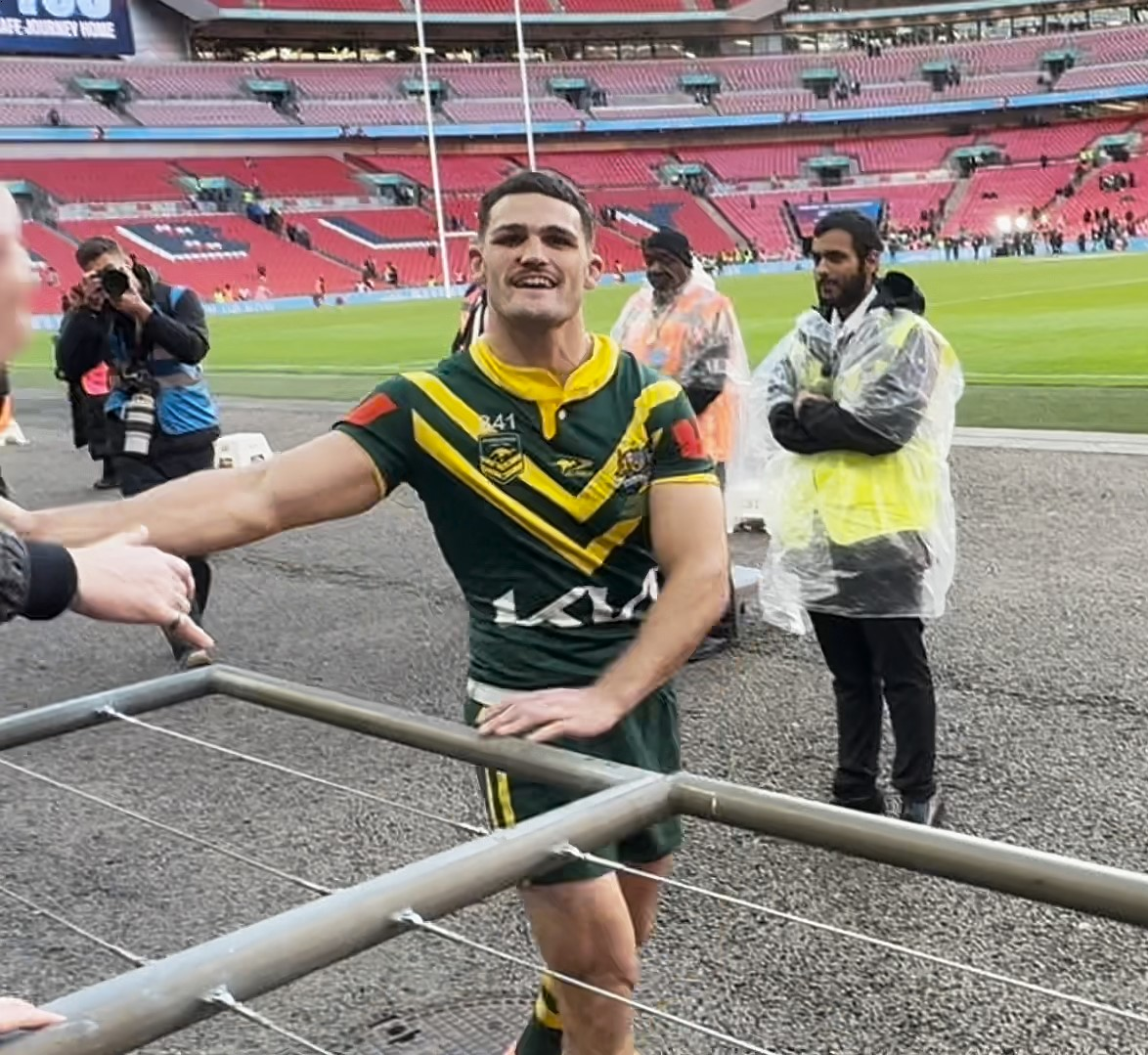

Personal information
- Full name: Nathan Cleary
- Born: 14 November 1997 (age 29) Sydney, New South Wales, Australia
- Height: 182 cm (6 ft 0 in)
- Weight: 92 kg (14 st 7 lb)

Playing information
- Position: Halfback
Club
Years	Team	Pld	T	G	FG	P
2016–	Penrith Panthers	217	73	813	19	1941
Representative
Years	Team	Pld	T	G	FG	P
2017	City NSW	1	0	0	0	0
2018–26	New South Wales	20	5	56	0	132
2022–25	Australia	8	1	45	0	94
- Source: As of 20 November 2026
- Partner: Mary Fowler
- Father: Ivan Cleary
- Relatives: Jason Death (uncle); Josh Stuart (uncle); Jett Cleary (brother)

Nathan Cleary (born 14 November 1997) is an Australian professional rugby league footballer who co-captains and plays as a halfback for the Penrith Panthers in the NRL. Widely considered one of the best players in the modern era, Cleary was halfback in five consecutive grand finals from 2020–2024. He was co-captain in four straight grand finals wins (2021, 2022, 2023, 2024) and received the Clive Churchill Medal as man of the match in the 2021 and 2023 grand finals.

Cleary was awarded Dally M Player of Year in 2026 and Dally M Halfback of The Year in 2020, 2021, 2025 and 2026. He was also awarded the Wally Lewis Medal as player of the 2026 State of Origin series and became New South Wales highest all-time points scorer. Cleary was a part of New South Wales 2018, 2019, 2021 and 2026 State of Origin series wins and was the vice-captain of New South Wales from 2020 to 2025.

He has represented Australia at international level, winning the 2021 Rugby League World Cup and the 2025 Rugby League Ashes series. He represented City NSW in 2017.

== Background ==
Cleary is the son of coach and former professional rugby league footballer Ivan Cleary who coaches him at the Penrith Panthers.

Cleary was born in Sydney, New South Wales, Australia.

He spent a number of his childhood years living in Auckland, New Zealand while his father was playing for, and later coaching, the New Zealand Warriors. He attended Sacred Heart College, Auckland for two years and, having grown up playing soccer, Cleary switched to rugby league during his pre-teens, playing at a junior level for the Mount Albert Lions in Auckland and the Penrith Brothers in Sydney. He completed his HSC while attending St Dominic's College, Penrith in 2015, where he was a prefect.

Cleary is of Croatian and Ukrainian descent. He is the nephew of Josh Stuart and Jason Death.

== Playing career ==
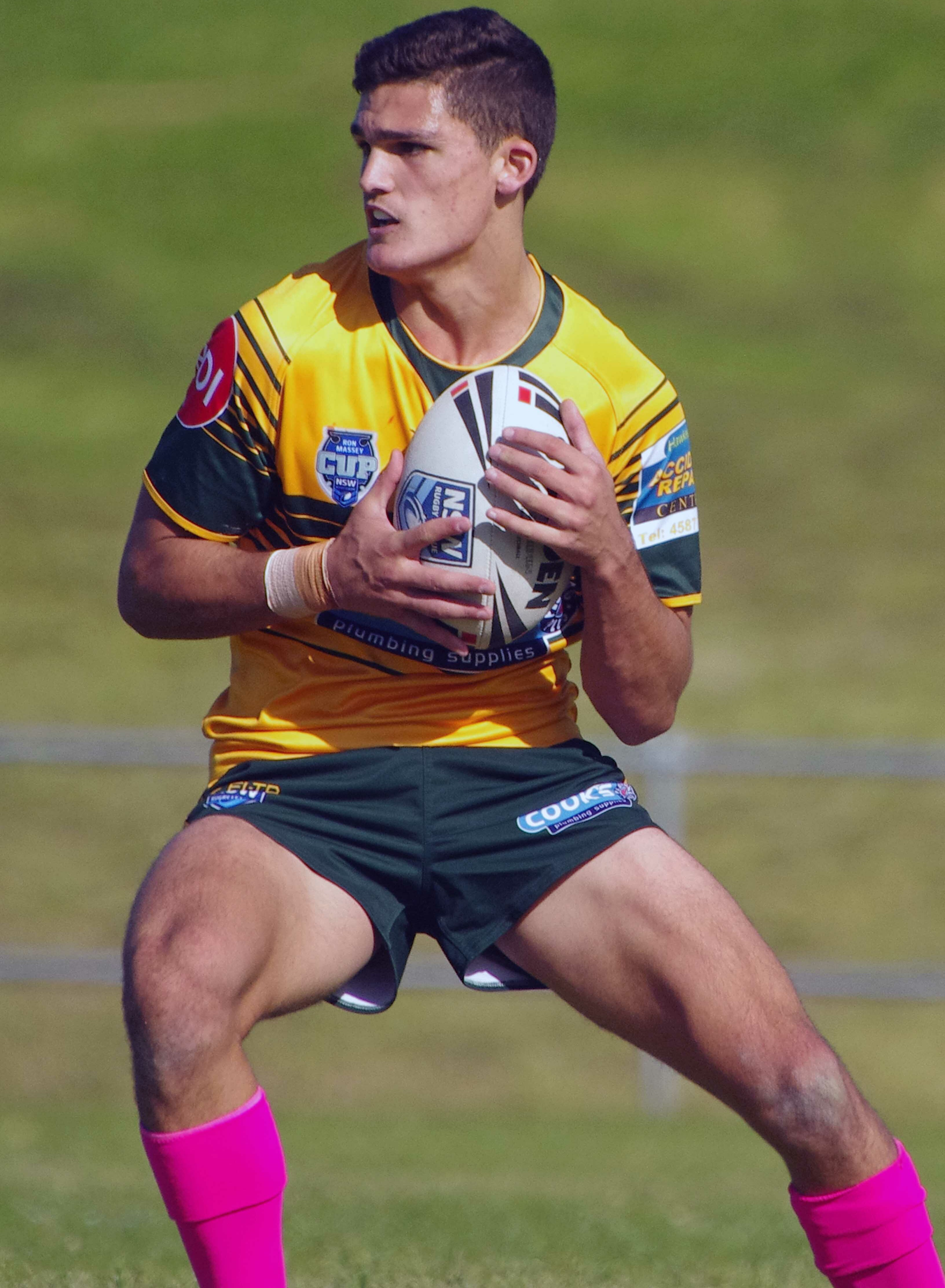
Cleary playing for the Windsor Wolves in 2015

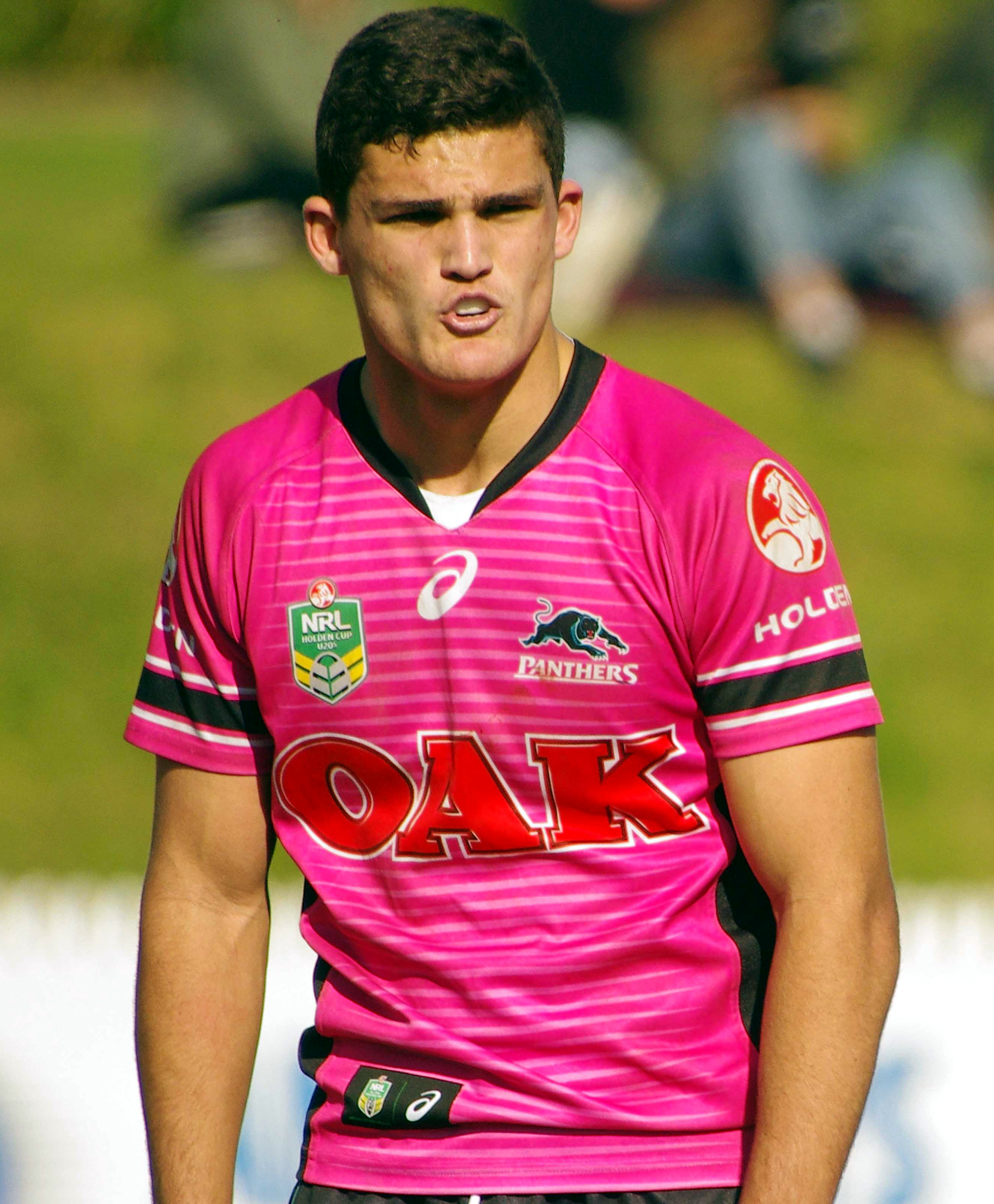
Cleary playing in the NYC in 2015

=== Early career ===
Cleary progressed through the Penrith club's junior system, playing in their Harold Matthews Cup (under 16) and S. G. Ball Cup (under 18) teams, the latter of which he captained in 2015.

He appeared for the Windsor Wolves in the Ron Massey Cup and Sydney Shield in a handful of games, before being called into Penrith's National Youth Competition (under 20) squad mid-season. Cleary was unavailable to play in Penrith's 2015 NYC Grand Final winning team due to his selection in the Australian Schoolboys team, whom he captained during their two match series against New Zealand under-18s. Cleary played 20 games, scoring 11 tries and kicking 109 goals for 262 points in his U20s career from 2015 to 2016.

=== 2016 ===
Starting the season as Penrith's first-choice halfback in the NYC, Cleary was selected to play for the Junior Kangaroos against the Junior Kiwis in May, where he played at five-eighth scoring a try and kicking 5 goals in the 34–20 win. He made his New South Wales Cup debut for the Penrith club in round 11, the only game he'd play in that competition in 2016. On 2 June, he extended his contract with the Panthers until the end of the 2019 season; his decision to do so voided a 'father-son' clause in his contract, which would have allowed him to leave the club following his father's dismissal as Penrith's head coach late the previous year, had he so pleased.

Two days after the signing, in round 13, Cleary made his NRL debut for the Penrith Panthers against the Melbourne Storm at five-eighth. Despite a 6–24 defeat at AAMI Park, Cleary had a great debut; making 38 tackles. The next week against the Manly-Warringah Sea Eagles, Cleary scored his first NRL try, as well as kicking five goals in Penrith's 31–24 win at Brookvale Oval. Following a man of the match performance against the South Sydney Rabbitohs in round 15, The Daily Telegraph said of Cleary: "[it's] hard to believe he is only 18 playing his third NRL game. Composed under pressure, kicked well and supported inside for a crucial second half try."

After the departure of seasoned half Jamie Soward and Peter Wallace shifting to hooker, Cleary remained at halfback for the rest of the season. He was in the race for the rookie of the year award, but lost to the Gold Coast Titans halfback, Ashley Taylor. He finished his debut season with 3 tries and 52 goals from 15 matches. He was the Penrith club's highest point-scorer with 116 points. Cleary was rewarded with being named in the emerging NSW Blues squad.

=== 2017 ===
Cleary was named in Penrith's squad for the 2017 NRL Auckland Nines. On 1 May, Cleary was named in the NSW City Origin representative team to play in the last ever City vs Country game.

He finished the season as highest pointscorer in the NRL with a total of 228 points, the youngest player to achieve this since 1913. He played in all 26 games for the Penrith club, scoring 11 tries and kicking 92 goals. Cleary also became the youngest player ever to score 200 points in a season.

=== 2018 ===
Cleary started the 2018 season as possibly the NRL's form player before suffering a knee injury in Round 3 against Canterbury-Bankstown where Penrith lost 20–18 at ANZ Stadium. While he was out with the injury, Cleary was still leading in contention for the halfback spot for New South Wales. Cleary made his return to the field in Round 11 against his father's team the Wests Tigers, where he helped steer the Penrith club to a 16–2 victory at Penrith Stadium. In his next performance in Round 12 against table toppers the St George Illawarra Dragons, Cleary earned his spot in the New South Wales squad after a fine match, scoring a try as Penrith won convincingly 28–2 at Penrith Stadium.

On 6 June 2018, Cleary made his debut for New South Wales in Game 1 of the 2018 State of Origin series against Queensland, starting at halfback in the 22–12 win at the MCG. Later that week, he kicked the match winning field goal in Penrith's 23–22 win over Canberra at GIO Stadium. He played in all 3 Origin games that year for the Blues at halfback.

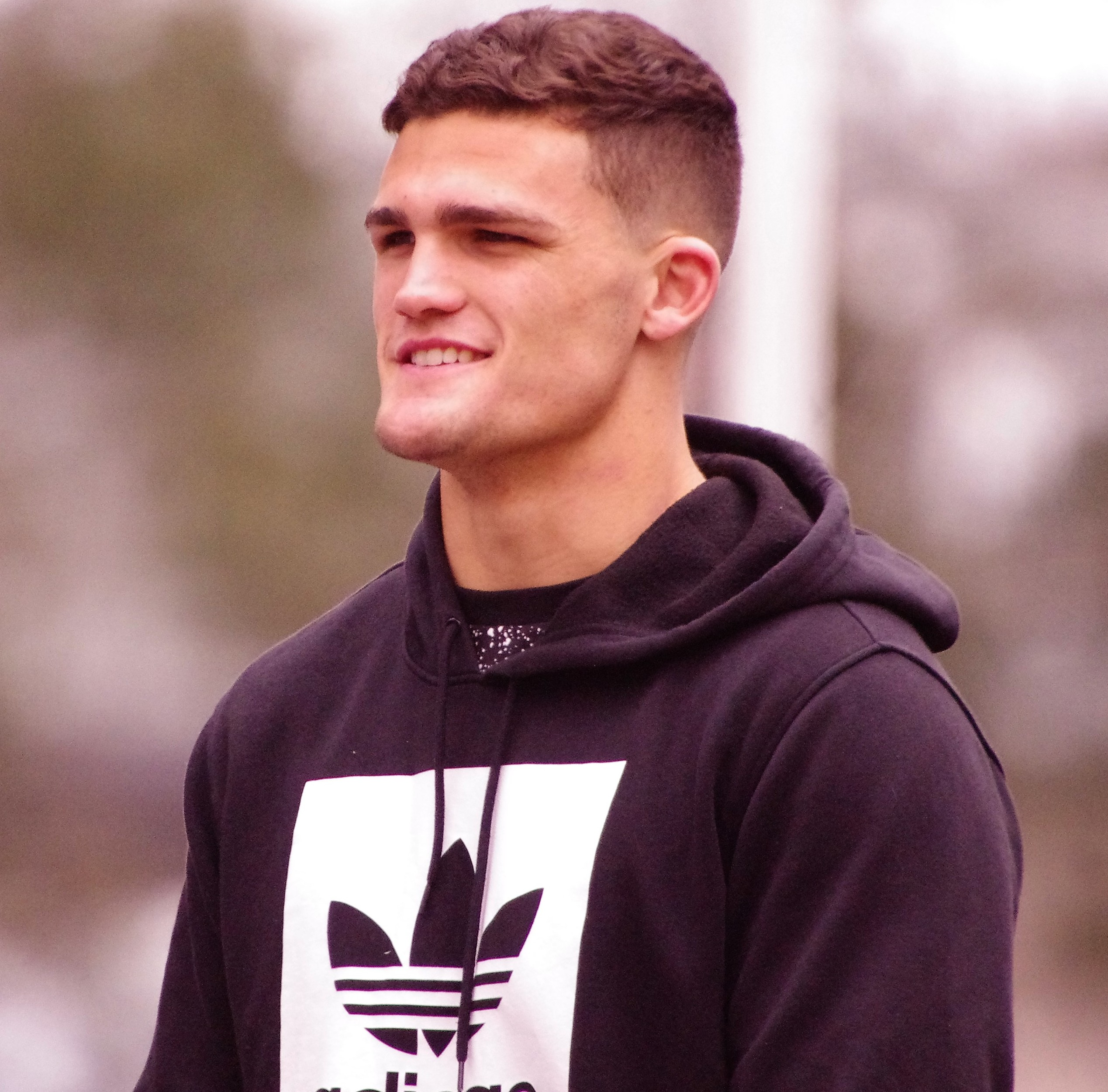
Cleary in 2018

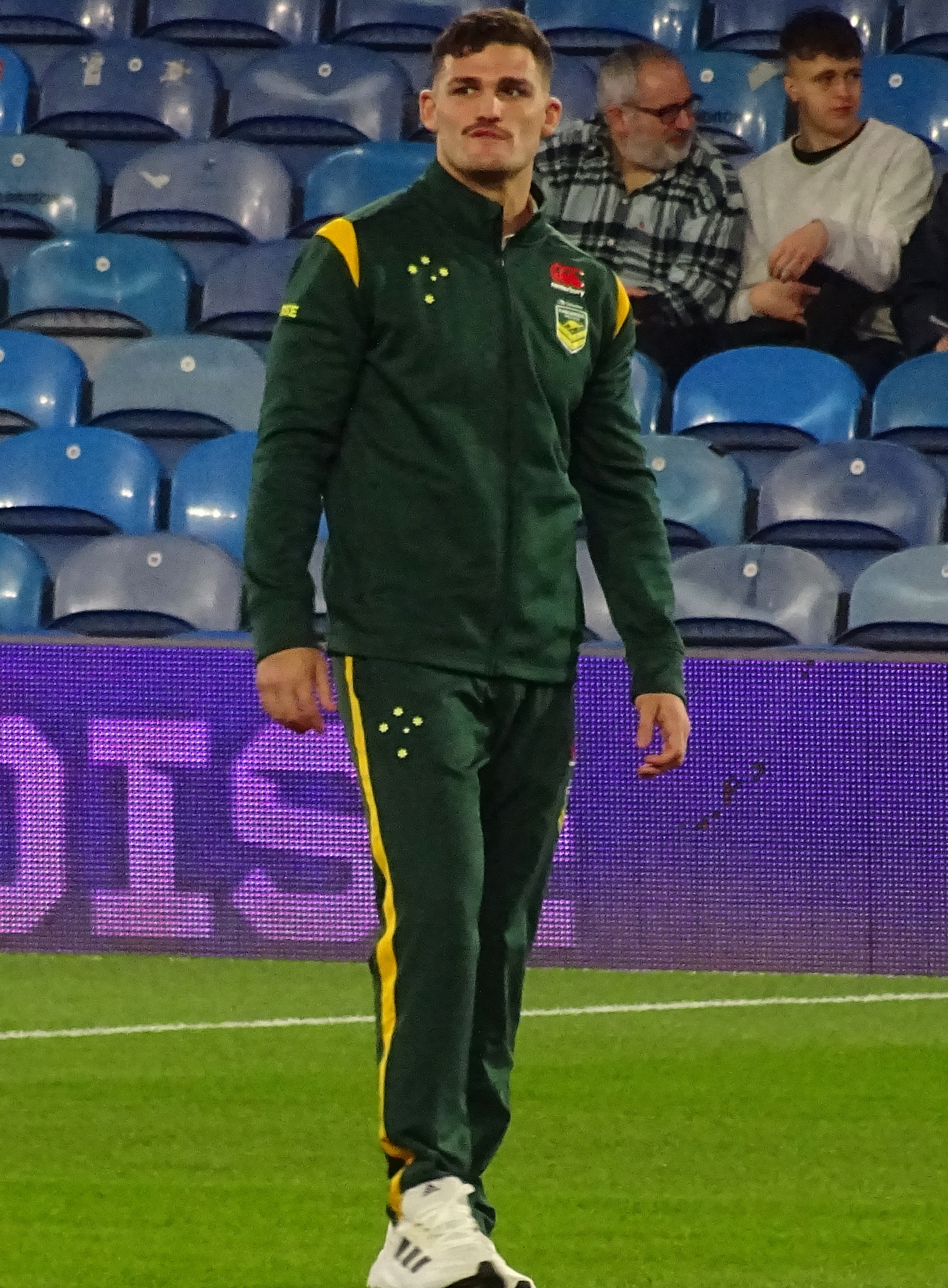
Cleary pre-game for Australia in 2022

=== 2019 ===
In the opening rounds of the 2019 season, Cleary had been criticized by sections of the media and fans for Penrith's underwhelming start to the season. In Round 4, Cleary kicked a goal from the sideline after the final siren to send their game against the Wests Tigers into extra time. Cleary then kicked a 40-metre field goal to win the game for Penrith 9–8.

On 27 May, Cleary was selected at halfback for New South Wales in Game 1 of the 2019 State of Origin series despite his lacklustre start to the year and with Penrith only managing 2 wins from their first 9 games. Despite New South Wales losing the first game, Cleary was retained for the second game in Perth which New South Wales won 38–6 at Perth Stadium.

In Round 18 against St George, Cleary scored a try and kicked 6 goals as Penrith won the match 40–18 at Penrith Park.

In round 25, the final game of the year, Cleary scored 4 tries and kicked 9 goals in their 54–10 victory over Newcastle. In this game Cleary scored 34 points to have the 2nd most points scored in a single game in the NRL. Cleary put on a master class despite this game having no impact on the finals as Penrith finished a disappointing 10th.

=== 2020 ===
In round 12, Cleary scored one try and kicked seven goals as Penrith defeated Manly 42–12 at Brookvale Oval.

In the 2020 qualifying final against the Sydney Roosters, Cleary scored a hat-trick and kicked a field goal in Penrith's 29–28 victory.

Cleary was fined $10,000 by the NRL on 28 April 2020 after breaking isolation protocols during the COVID-19 pandemic when a photo of him at his home with a group of women on Anzac Day was uploaded to social media. A video of the event contradicted his apology, so he received a two-match ban as well as a $30,000 fine.

Cleary played a total of 21 games for Penrith in the 2020 NRL season including the grand final. He threw a pass in the first half of the match which was intercepted by Melbourne winger Suliasi Vunivalu who raced away to score a try at a pivotal moment in the game, but scored a last minute try and kicked two goals in the 26–20 loss.

Cleary was selected by New South Wales for the 2020 State of Origin series. He played poorly in the game 1 loss, with Andrew Johns calling for him to be dropped. Roy Masters said, "Cleary has a weakness and the Maroons have identified it. Cleary's below-par performances in the NRL grand final and the first State of Origin match are directly related to the pressure imposed on his kicking game." He was awarded man of the match in game 2 of the series, where he was praised for his exceptional kicking game, but another loss in game 3 saw a shock 2–1 series defeat. He said after, "2020 as a whole has been a roller coaster, really. I've ridden the highs and lows. I've lost some pretty big games in the last month."

=== 2021 ===
In round 10, Cleary scored a hat-trick and kicked eight goals in Penrith's 48–12 victory over the Gold Coast. The following week, he scored two tries and kicked ten goals in Penrith's 56–12 victory over South Sydney.

Cleary kicked eight goals for New South Wales in the opening game of the 2021 State of Origin series as they defeated Queensland 50–6.

On 30 June, it was announced Cleary would be unable to play for an indefinite period after suffering a shoulder injury. In round 22, he made his return to the Penrith team in a 34–16 victory over St. George Illawarra.

Cleary played a total of 20 games for Penrith in the 2021 NRL season including the club's 2021 NRL Grand Final victory over South Sydney. Cleary was awarded the Clive Churchill Medal for being man of the match. He was also named Dally M Halfback of the year.

On 19 October, Cleary was handed a proposed $7000 fine by the NRL and a breach notice which alleges that he acted contrary to the best interests of the game after he was photographed on social media acting in a disrespectful manner toward the NRL Telstra Premiership Trophy. Although Cleary nor any of the Penrith players had broken the trophy, the NRL alleges Cleary and teammate Stephen Crichton showed disrespect towards the individuals depicted in the iconic moment memorialised on the Trophy.

=== 2022 ===
On 29 May, Cleary was selected by New South Wales to play in game one of the 2022 State of Origin series.

In round 14 of the 2022 NRL season, Cleary scored a try and kicked seven goals in Penrith's 42–6 victory over Newcastle.

In game 2 of the 2022 State of Origin series, Cleary scored two tries and kicked eight goals in New South Wales 44–12 victory over Queensland.

In game 3, New South Wales were behind 16–12 against Queensland with less than two minutes remaining when Cleary elected a chip kick over the top of the defensive line which was intercepted by Queensland's Ben Hunt who ran 70 metres to score the match winning try. In round 20, Cleary was sent off in Penrith's 34–10 loss against Parramatta for a dangerous lifting tackle.

On 30 July, Cleary was suspended for five games over the tackle which meant he would miss the remainder of the 2022 regular season.

In the 2022 Qualifying Final, Cleary returned to the Penrith side and put in a man of the match performance in the club's 27–8 victory over Parramatta.

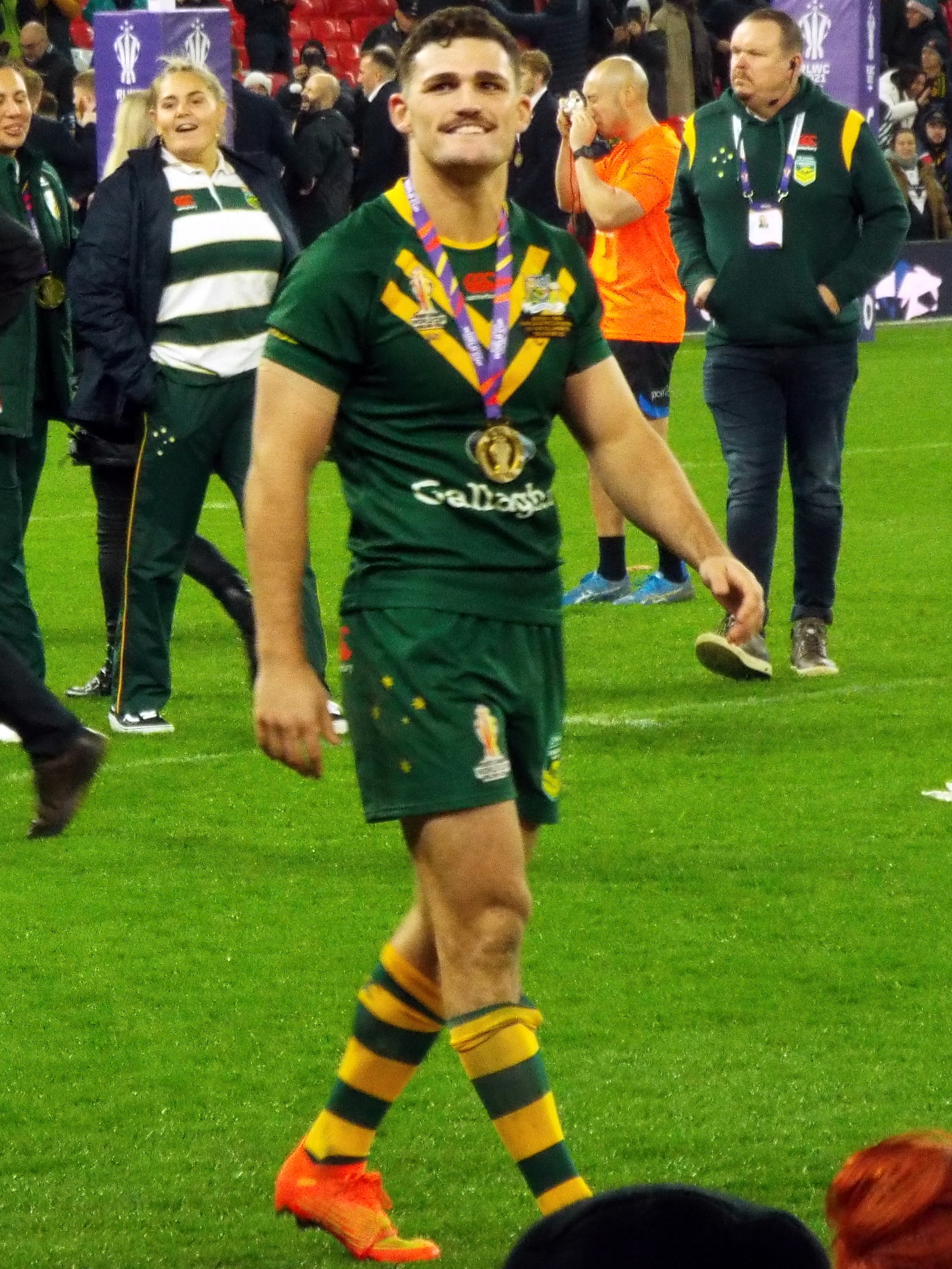
Cleary playing for the Kangaroos in 2022

Cleary played for 17 games for Penrith throughout the year including their 2022 NRL Grand Final victory over Parramatta.

In October he was named in the Australia squad for the 2021 Rugby League World Cup. In the second match of Australia's 2021 Rugby League World Cup campaign, Cleary made his debut for Australia scoring one try and kicking 12 goals during an 84–0 victory over Scotland. Cleary played for Australia in their 2021 Rugby League World Cup final victory over Samoa.

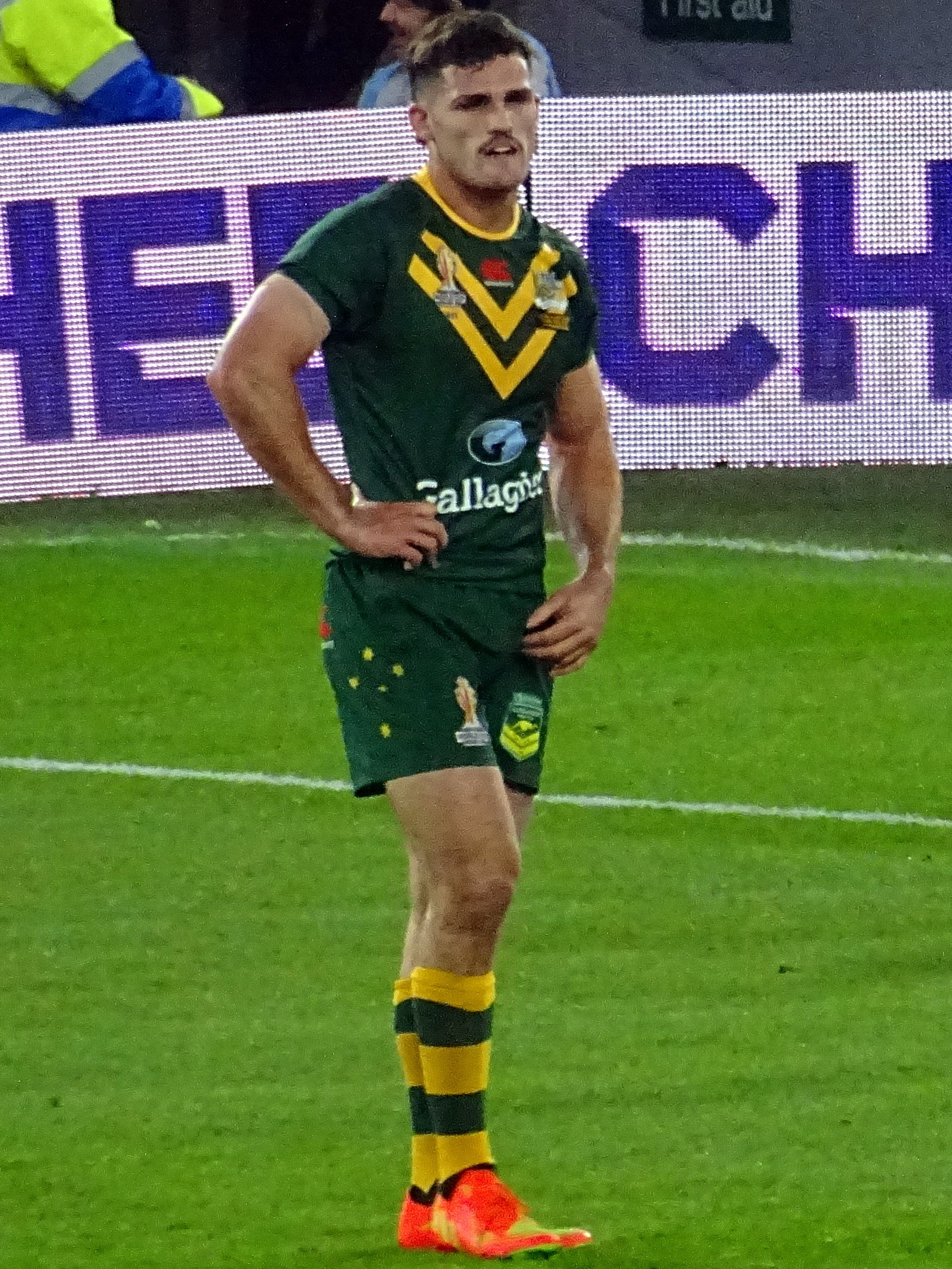
Cleary playing for Australia in 2022

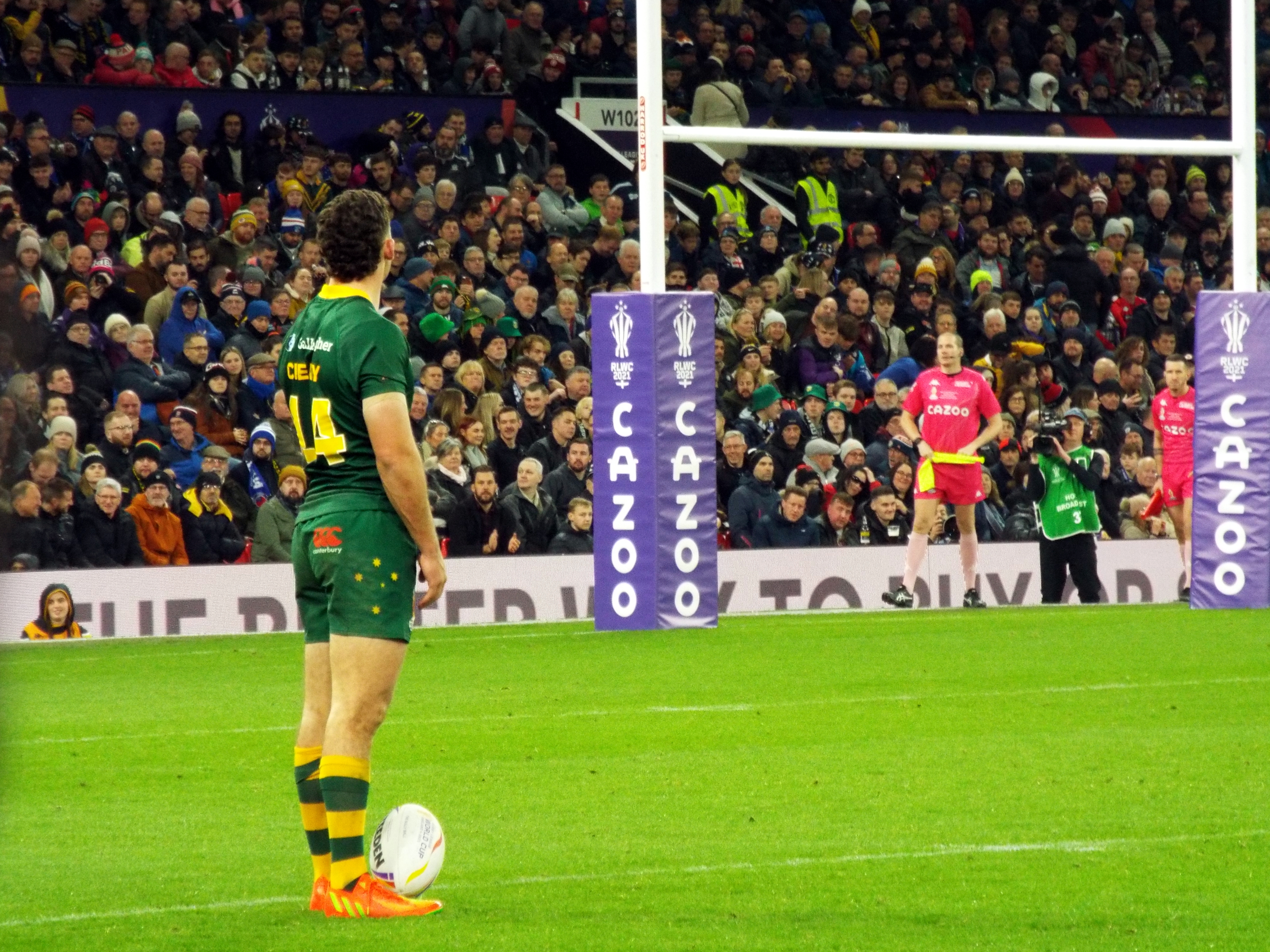
Cleary preparing to kick a goal in the 2021 RLWC Final for the Kangaroos in 2022

=== 2023 ===
On 18 February, Cleary played in Penrith's 13–12 upset loss to St Helens RFC in the 2023 World Club Challenge. In round 4 of the 2023 NRL season, Cleary kicked a two-point field goal from 40 metres out with seconds remaining to tie the game between Penrith and Parramatta at 16–16. Penrith would go on to lose the match 17–16 in golden point extra-time. The following week, Cleary scored one try, kicked eight goals and one field goal in Penrith's 53–12 victory over Canberra.

In round 6, Cleary scored two tries and kicked seven goals in Penrith's 44–12 victory over Manly. In round 7, Cleary kicked two field goals including the winner during Penrith's 16–15 golden point extra-time victory over Newcastle. On 22 May, Cleary was selected by New South Wales for game one of the 2023 State of Origin series.

In round 14, Cleary was taken from the field during Penrith's 26–18 victory over St. George Illawarra with a leg injury. It was later announced that Cleary would be ruled out for up to six weeks with a torn hamstring. In round 21, Cleary made his return to the Penrith side in their 44–18 victory over Canterbury.

In the 2023 preliminary final, Cleary scored a try and kicked seven goals in Penrith's dominant 38–4 victory over Melbourne.

Cleary played 22 matches for Penrith in the 2023 NRL season including the club's 26–24 victory over Brisbane in the 2023 NRL Grand Final as Penrith won their third straight premiership. Cleary won the Clive Churchill medal as man of the match after he inspired the Penrith side to come back from a 16-point deficit with less than 20 minutes to go, the largest successful Grand Final turnaround of NRL history despite suffering a grade 3 torn PCL in the ninth minute of the match. With star team-mates Jarome Luai (shoulder), Isaah Yeo and Scott Sorensen (both HIA) forced from the field, Cleary remarkably orchestrated the comeback effort with involvements in all three tries. He assisted Moses Leota (62 mins) and Stephen Crichton (67 mins), before scoring the winning try himself with less than three minutes remaining.

=== 2024 ===
On 24 February, Cleary played in Penrith's 2024 World Club Challenge final loss against the Wigan Warriors. Cleary scored a try during the first half of the match.

On 25 March, it was announced that Cleary would be ruled out for a month with a hamstring injury. On 12 May it was announced that Cleary would again be ruled out for eight weeks after he re-injured his hamstring in Penrith's round 10 win against Canterbury.

In round 20, Cleary made his return to the Penrith team and kicked a two-point field goal in golden point extra-time as they defeated the Dolphins 28–26.

The following week, Cleary scored a hat-trick and kicked seven goals in Penrith's 46–10 victory over St. George Illawarra. In round 24, Cleary suffered a shoulder injury in Penrith's narrow loss to Melbourne and was ruled out for an indefinite period.

Cleary made his return to the Penrith lineup in their 30–10 qualifying final victory over the Sydney Roosters.

Cleary played a total of 13 matches for Penrith in the 2024 NRL season including the clubs 14–6 grand final victory over the Melbourne Storm.

=== 2025 ===
In round 7 of the 2025 NRL season, Cleary became Penrith's all-time record point scorer during the clubs 40–12 victory over the Sydney Roosters.

In May, Cleary was selected by New South Wales ahead of game one in the 2025 State of Origin series.

Cleary played in all three games of the 2025 State of Origin series which New South Wales were widely tipped to win against Queensland. New South Wales would lose the series 1–2 with many criticising Cleary for his inability to take control of the team and for the fact the player had lost three deciding games against Queensland.

Cleary played a total of 22 games for Penrith in the 2025 NRL season as the club finished 7th on the table. Cleary played in Penrith's preliminary final loss against the Brisbane Broncos.

=== 2026 ===
In round 7 of the 2026 NRL season, Cleary kicked the winning field goal in golden point extra-time as Penrith defeated the Dolphins 23–22. In May, Cleary was selected by New South Wales for game one in the 2026 State of Origin series. He played all three games as the blues won 2–1. Cleary was awarded with the Wally Lewis Medal for the Player of the Series. In week 3 of the 2026 finals series during the Panthers 14-22 loss against the Newcastle Knights, Cleary suffered a compound fracture of his lower leg from a hip drop tackle from Knights player Phoenix Crossland.

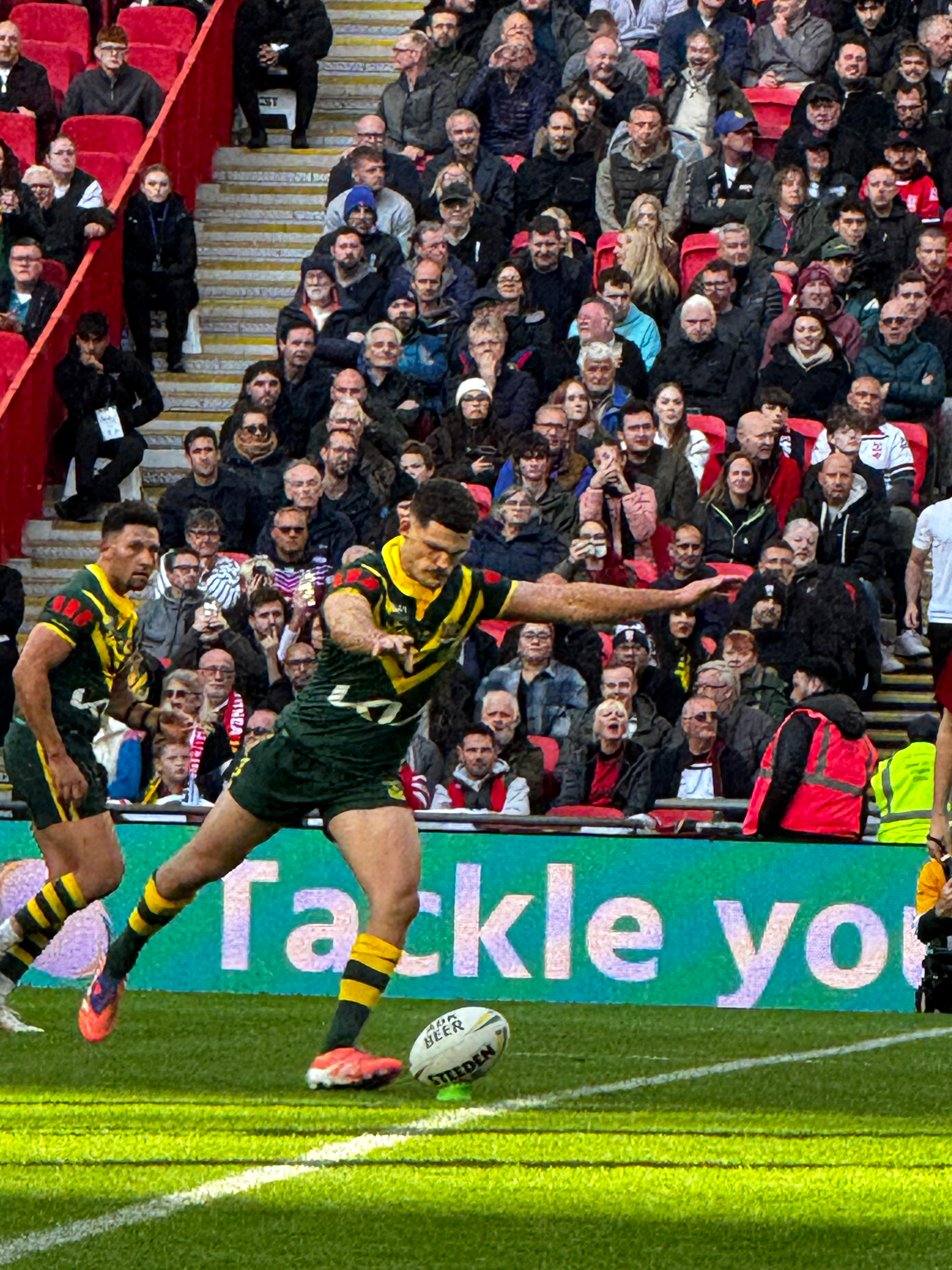
Cleary kicking a goal for the Kangaroos in 2025

== Honours ==
Individual

- Dally M Medal: 2026
- Clive Churchill Medal: 2021, 2023
- Wally Lewis Medal: 2026
- Dally M Halfback of the Year: 2020, 2021, 2025, 2026
- RLPA Players' Champion: 2020, 2026
- RLPA Halfback of the Year: 2020, 2021, 2026
- Brad Fittler Medal: 2020, 2026
- Merv Cartwright Medal: 2020, 2021, 2025
- State of Origin Man of the Match: 4
  - 2020 Game II / 2022 Game II / 2026 Game I / 2026 Game III

Penrith Panthers

- NRL Premiership: 2021, 2022, 2023, 2024
- NRL Minor Premiership: 2020, 2022, 2023, 2026
- 55th Penrith Panthers Captain

New South Wales

- State of Origin Series: 2018, 2019, 2021, 2026

Australia

- World Cup: 2021
- Ashes Series: 2025

== Statistics ==
=== Club statistics ===
†	Denotes seasons in which Cleary won an NRL Premiership

Season	Team	Matches	T	G	GK %	F/G	Pts
2016	Penrith	15	3	53	80.30%	0	118
2017	Penrith	26	11	92	90.20%	0	228
2018	Penrith	17	4	40	78.43%	2	98
2019	Penrith	21	10	58	87.88%	1	157
2020	Penrith	21	8	86	79.63%	4	208
2021†	Penrith	20	10	94	85.45%	2 (Note: Includes 1 two point field goal.)	231
2022†	Penrith	17	3	76	85.39%	1	165
2023†	Penrith	22	8	89	83.96%	5 (Note: Includes 1 two point field goal.)	216
2024†	Penrith	13	4	50	81.97%	1	118
2025	Penrith	22	6	79	87.78%	1	184
2026	Penrith	23	6	96	84.96%	2	218
Career Total		217	73	813	84.51%	19	1941

=== Head to head record ===
Opponent	Played	Won	Lost	Drawn	Win %
Broncos	16	9	7	0	56%
Raiders	14	10	4	0	71%
Bulldogs	15	12	3	0	80%
Sharks	13	9	4	0	69%
Dolphins	3	2	1	0	67%
Titans	9	8	1	0	89%
Sea Eagles	14	11	3	0	79%
Storm	17	9	8	0	53%
Knights	13	11	2	0	85%
Cowboys	12	7	4	1	63%
Eels	21	14	7	0	67%
Dragons	10	8	2	0	80%
Rabbitohs	16	11	5	0	69%
Roosters	17	12	5	0	71%
Warriors	12	8	4	0	67%
Tigers	15	12	3	0	80%

=== Points against all other teams ===
Opponent	Played	Tries	Goals	Field Goals	Total Points	Points Per Game
Broncos	16	5	57	3	138	8.6
Raiders	14	6	60	2	146	10.4
Bulldogs	15	3	53	0	118	7.9
Sharks	13	4	56	0	128	9.8
Dolphins	3	0	10	2	23	7.7
Titans	9	5	37	2	97	10.8
Sea Eagles	14	4	55	0	126	9.0
Storm	17	4	43	1	103	6.1
Knights	13	8	62	2	158	12.2
Cowboys	12	5	41	0	102	8.5
Eels	21	4	69	2	157	7.5
Dragons	10	7	39	0	106	10.6
Rabbitohs	16	6	56	1	137	8.6
Roosters	17	5	74	2	170	10.0
Warriors	12	5	42	0	104	8.7
Tigers	15	2	59	2	128	8.5

== Personal life ==
Cleary is co-owner of Drink West Brewery with Tyson Pedro and Tai Tuivasa.

In October 2023, Cleary announced his support for the Yes campaign for an Indigenous Voice to Parliament.

In August 2023, Cleary started dating Australian Matildas star Mary Fowler. The two went public with their relationship in January 2024.
