= Todd Anderson (rugby league) =

Australian rugby league footballer

Personal information
- Born: 2 November 1967 (age 58) Newcastle, New South Wales, Australia

Playing information
- Position: Prop, Second-row
Club
Years	Team	Pld	T	G	FG	P
1990	Newcastle Knights	1	0	0	0	0
Representative
Years	Team	Pld	T	G	FG	P
1989	NSW Country	1	0	0	0	0
- Source: As of 6 February 2019

Todd Anderson (born 2 November 1967) is an Australian former rugby league footballer who played in the 1990s. He played for the Newcastle Knights in 1990, and his only game for the club was in Round 16, 1990, against North Sydney at North Sydney Oval, which ended in a 28-8 victory.
