= City vs Country Origin =

Annual Australian rugby league football match

- Sport: Rugby league
- Instituted: 1928
- Inaugural season: 1987 (Origin rules)
- Ceased: 2017
- Number of teams: 2
- Country: Australia (NSWRL/CRL)
- Shield Holders: City (2017)
- Most titles: City (68 titles)
- Broadcast partner: Nine Network
- Related competition: State of Origin

City vs Country Origin was an annual Australian rugby league football match that took place in New South Wales between City and Country representative sides. The City side represented the Sydney metropolitan area. The Country side represented the rest of New South Wales.

The concept of an annual clash between a City and Country team originally started in 1911 with a Metropolitan side taking on the Country team. The first match officially took place on 10 June 1911 with City taking the victory 29 to 8. It would take another seventeen years before an annual clash between an official City and Country side was agreed upon during the 1928 season.

Both sides were originally made up of the best players playing in the Country Rugby League of New South Wales and the Sydney-based NSWRL Premiership. However, the increasing drain of players from rural areas to the NSWRL clubs led to the City side becoming increasingly dominant and the Country side uncompetitive. The 'origin rule' for player qualification being introduced in 1987 so players in NSWRL clubs originally from outside Sydney became eligible to represent Country.

The players who represented the City and Country sides came from the National Rugby League competition in Australia. The match was played before the State of Origin series and was often referred to as a selection trial for the New South Wales Blues team.

The final senior men's City vs Country annual match was played in 2017, with the fixture thereafter scrapped.

From 2021, an expanded City vs Country representative round featuring grades other than senior men's was introduced, including Under 16's, Under 18's and Open Age Men's games, Open Age Women's games, and Wheelchair and Physical Disability, was introduced.

== History ==
Country versus City had long played a part in New South Wales sporting history, with the first traces of the concept being linked back as far as 1886. The then Southern Rugby Football Union (later to become the NSWRU) would hold an annual 'test match' between a Combined Countrymen and Metropolis sides, with the match to be used by the organisation for picking players for NSW.

The concept took off and by the early 1900s 'Country Week', as it was titled, became a major component of the Rugby calendar. This rivalry between City and Country continued to occur after Rugby League was formed in 1907. However, it was only in 1911 that rugby league held its first recorded City V Country clash. While there is some indication that a match may have been played in 1910, the code's infancy probably resulted in the game not being of a high enough standard to be recorded.

The representative match was played on a laissez-faire basis in League up until 1928 when the Country Rugby League and New South Wales Rugby League saw the value in making the tournament an annual match. This was understandable at the time for League, as many areas in Country NSW had not even heard of League until late 1927.

Newcastle was the first non-Sydney town to take up the code in 1909 in its own domestic competition, which was boosted by the participation of the Newcastle Rebels in the NSWRL Sydney competition in 1908 and 1909. The Illawarra region followed in 1910, but further away from Sydney it took longer for the code make any impact.

By the time the match was made a permanent fixture, interest in the concept was high enough to make it sustainable. However, similar to State of Origin before 1980, Country Rugby League faced the problem of its major players being snapped up by the richer Sydney clubs, draining the regional representative sides. This assisted City's domination of the fixture.

Through the competition's existence, it was Sydney vs the rest of NSW, although players from the Central Coast (such as Matt Orford and Mark O'Meley) represented City, but other players from the Central Coast (such as Chris Heighington) represented Country.

It was not until 1987, with the recent inclusions of Canberra, Illawarra and Newcastle in the NSWRL competition, that the "player drain" issue was addressed. The Origin rule, which was also used to revive the State of Origin concept, proved invaluable in giving Country the player base it needed to compete with the City team. However, Country only recorded their first win five years after the concept was introduced, in 1992.

Country then won three out of the five years after their first Origin victory before the City vs Country concept was removed from the representative scene (much like the World Sevens and Kangaroo Tours) as a result of the Super League War.

The competition was not revived until four years later, when the National Rugby League saw the match's value in terms of media exposure, television ratings and the merit of taking the fixture to country towns (the last time the game was played in Sydney was 1993 at Parramatta Stadium while the last full time NRL ground to host the game was WIN Stadium in Wollongong).

The last fixture was played in Mudgee on 7 May 2017, with more NRL games being played in regional New South Wales instead.

== City vs Country results ==
=== Overall summary ===
Games played: 94

Team	Wins	Losses	Draw
City Origin	68	23	3
Country Origin	23	68	3

=== Year by year ===
The table below shows the results of the annual City vs Country games from 1928 to the present day. The colour of the year denotes the team that has won or retained the shield.

Under residency selection rules
1928	Country	35	City	34
1929	City	16	Country	5
1930	Country	35	City	26
1931	City	17	Country	15
1932	City	27	Country	14
1933	City	47	Country	16
1933	City	17	Country	17
1934	City	28	Country	14
1934	City	32	Country	29
1935	City	20	Country	5
1936	City	41	Country	8
1937	Country	20	City	12
1937	Country	15	City	5
1938	City	42	Country	12
1939	City	38	Country	17
1940	City	28	Country	10
1941	City	44	Country	21
1942	Country	14	City	11
1943	City	37	Country	25
1944	City	17	Country	10
1945	City	41	Country	12
1946	City	31	Country	10
1947	City	33	Country	10
1948	City	28	Country	13
1948	Country	10	City	6
1949	City	23	Country	2
1950	City	51	Country	13
1951	City	24	Country	6
1952	City	23	Country	21
1953	Country	28	City	27
1954	City	50	Country	9
1955	City	31	Country	18
1956	City	32	Country	17
1957	City	53	Country	2
1958	City	55	Country	14
1959	City	37	Country	7
1960	City	22	Country	2
1961	Country	19	City	5
1962	Country	18	City	8
1963	City	35	Country	11
1964	City	27	Country	4
1965	City	32	Country	2
1966	City	18	Country	14
1967	City	17	Country	16
1967	Country	16	City	12
1968	City	34	Country	14
1969	City	27	Country	20
1970	City	22	Country	18
1971	City	17	Country	0
1972	City	35	Country	6
1973	City	33	Country	17
1974	City	23	Country	0
1975	Country	19	City	9
1976	City	47	Country	0
1977	City	36	Country	0
1978	City	30	Country	13
1979	City	39	Country	0
1980	City	55	Country	2
1981	City	38	Country	7
1982	City	47	Country	3
1983	City	30	Country	13
1984	City	38	Country	12
1985	City	18	Country	12
1986	City	34	Country	16

Under origin selection rules
1987	City	30	Country	22
1988	City	20	Country	18
1989	City	16	Country	8
1990	City	28	Country	26
1991	City	22	Country	12
1992	Country	17	City	10
1993	City	7	Country	0
1994	Country	22	City	2
1995	City	16	Country	8
1996	Country	18	City	16
1997	Country	17	City	4
1998	Not Held			
1999	Not Held			
2000	Not Held			
2001	Country	42	City	10
2002	City	26	Country	16
2003	City	17	Country	16
2004	Country	22	City	18
2005	City	29	Country	22
2006	Country	12	City	10
2007	City	12	Country	6
2008	City	22	Country	22
2009	City	40	Country	18
2010	Country	36	City	18
2011	Country	18	City	12
2012	City	24	Country	22
2013	Country	18	City	12
2014	Country	26	City	26
2015	Country	34	City	22
2016	City	44	Country	30
2017	City	20	Country	10

Return to residency selection rules
2021	City	38	Country	12
2022	Country	36	City	34

== Women's City vs Country Origin ==
The Women's City vs Country Origin is the Women's rugby league version of the game and has been running since 2017.

Women's City Country matches
2017	City	20	Country	8
2018	Country	16	City	12
2019	City	34	Country	4
2021	City	40	Country	16
2022	Country	14	City	6

== See also ==
- List of Country Origin team players
- List of New South Wales City Origin rugby league team players
- New South Wales Country Rugby League
- New South Wales Rugby League
- Rugby league in New South Wales
- State of Origin series
