= City New South Wales rugby league team =

Representative rugby league team

City
Team information
- Governing body: New South Wales Rugby League
- Head coach: Brad Fittler
- Captain: Paul Gallen
- Most caps: 12 – Joe Pearce
- Top try-scorer: 11 – Brian Carlson
- Top point-scorer: 91 – Michael Cronin

Team results
- First game
- City 29–8 Country (10 June 1911)
- First City vs Country Origin
- City Origin 30–22 Country Origin (16 May 1987)
- Biggest win
- City 55–2 Country (17 May 1980)
- Biggest defeat
- Country Origin 42–10 City Origin (8 June 2001)

The Sydney Rugby League team, known as the City Rugby League team, or Sydney Firsts, or Sydney Capitals, is a representative rugby league team. From 2021, the men's team is to consist of players selected from the New South Wales Rugby League Ron Massey Cup competition to play against a combined team selected from Country, New South Wales competitions. The women's team is selected on a region of origin basis from the NSWRL Women's Premiership.

The reorganisation in 2021 means the Sydney / City team is selected from a third-tier competition, as the Ron Massey Cup sits below the first-tier National Rugby League and the second-tier New South Wales Cup. Previously, the Sydney / City team was selected from the first-tier competition. The first match by a Sydney Metropolitan team was held in 1909 against New Zealand. The first match against a Country representative team was held in 1911. Matches by Sydney against international touring teams continued until the 1970s. Annual matches by City against Country were played in most years until 1993. A City vs Country Origin match was introduced in 1987 and this ran until 2017, with a three season hiatus in 1998 to 2000.

== History ==
The New South Wales City team first competed against New South Wales Country on 10 June 1911 which City won 2–8. The first time the match was made an annual event began in 1928 with NSW Country defeating City 35–34.

A Sydney team was assembled for the 1953 American All Stars tour of Australia and New Zealand. The first City V Country origin match occurred on 16 May 1987 with City running out winners 30–22.

In 2016, it was announced by the NRL that the City V Country fixture was to be scrapped beyond the 2017 season. The reasons behind the decision were to clubs pulling their players out of the match and others cited player drain as a reason for the fixture to be culled. There was also a sentiment that the fixture had gone from being a genuine audition match for a potential New South Wales origin jersey to being a regular game as most of the New South Wales side had already been picked prior to the match starting.

On 14 May 2017, the final City v Country fixture was played with NSW City defeating Country 20–8.

Overall, New South Wales City were much more successful than New South Wales Country winning a total of 68 games in the annual fixture as opposed to Country's 22 wins with City winning each year from 1976 to 1991.

== Location ==
Any players whose junior football was played for a club within the greater area of Sydney city is deemed eligible to play for the City RL. Meanwhile, anyone from outside the Sydney area can be considered for selection for Country RL Team.

== Men's City v Country Match ==
=== 2022 Squad ===
The City squad for the 2022 Open Age Men's match against Country. The team is coached by Brett Cook.

J#	Position	Player	Ron Massey Cup Club
1	Five-eighth	Clayton Faulalo	Wentworthville Magpies
2	Wing	Eparama Navale	Mounties
3	Centre, Five-eighth	Eli Roberts	Hills District Bulls
4	Centre	Raymond Lesoa	St Marys Saints
5	Wing	Edward Aiono	St Marys Saints
6	Five-eighth, Halfback	Keiran Hayman	Hills District Bulls
7	Halfback	Jesse Marschke	Hills District Bulls
8	Prop	Antonio Pelesasa	St Marys Saints
9	Hooker	Brad Keighran	Hills District Bulls
10	Prop	Niko Apelu	Wentworthville Magpies
11	Second-row	Steven Tavita	Hills District Bulls
12	Second-row	Patrick Hollis	St Marys Saints
13	Lock	Denzal Tonise	Hills District Bulls
14	interchange, Hooker	Jarrod Brackenhofer	St Marys Saints
15	interchange, Second-row	Joe Vaegaau	St Marys Saints
16	interchange, Second-row	Cleveland McGhie	Ryde-Eastwood Hawks
17	interchange, Prop	D'rhys Miller	Western Suburbs Magpies
18	interchange, Lock	Lopeti Mafi	Blacktown Workers Sea Eagles

Note: Eli Levido, Manaia Rudolph, Caleb Uele (all Glebe) and Semisi Kioa (Mounties) were named in the selected squad but are not named in the programme.

== Women's City vs Country Match ==
City v Country Women's matches were occasionally played prior to the re-introduction of a stand-alone match in 2017. In 2018 and 2019 the games were played within the National Championships. The 2020 National Championships were cancelled due to the COVID-19 Pandemic in Australia. In 2021 the National Championships were reorganised, and an open age City v Country Women's Origin was scheduled separately from the National Championships.

=== 2022 Squad ===
The following players were selected in the City Origin Women's team to play on 14 May 2022 at 4 Pines Park. The team was coached by Darrin Borthwick.

J#	Player	2022 State Club	Position(s)	City						NRLW										2021 State	Interstate	Tests	All Stars
J#	Player	2022 State Club	Position(s)	Dbt	S	M	T	G	Pts	Dbt	S	M	T	G	Pts	2018	2019	2020	2021	2021 State	Interstate	Tests	All Stars
1	Jaime Chapman	Tweed Heads	Fullback	—	1	1	0	0	0	2020	2	9	3	0	12	—	—	3m	6m 3t	4m 1t	—	—	2m 2t
2	Taina Naividi	Mounties	Wing	2021	2	2	0	0	0	2021	1	5	0	0	0	—	—	—	5m	10m 9t	—	—	—
3	Mareva Swann	Mounties	Centre	—	1	1	0	0	0	—	0	0	0	0	0	—	—	—	—	8m 6t	—	—	—
4	Andie Robinson	Cronulla	Centre	—	1	1	1	0	4	—	0	0	0	0	0	—	—	—	—	9m 4t	—	—	—
5	Leianne Fiaoo	Cronulla	Centre, Wing	—	1	1	0	0	0	2021	1	7	2	0	8	—	—	—	7m 2t	11m 11t	—	1m 1t	—
6	Emily Curtain	Wests Tigers	Five-eighth	—	1	1	0	0	0	2021	1	3	1	0	4	—	—	—	3m 1t	10m 6t 32g	—	—	—
7	Maddie Studdon	Cronulla	Halfback	2018	4	8	2	14	36	2018	4	13	1	15	35	2m	4m 8g	2m	5m 1t 7g	9m 3t 45g	7m 1t 7g	6m 1t 13g	3m 2g
8	Filomina Hanisi	Mounties	Prop	2020	2	2	0	0	0	2020	2	9	0	0	0	—	—	4m	5m	9m	2m 1t	—	—
9	Renee Targett	North Sydney	Hooker	2021	2	2	0	0	0	2021	1	6	0	0	0	—	—	—	6m	10m	—	—	—
10	Tommaya Kelly-Sines	Mounties	Prop	2021	2	2	0	0	0	2021	1	4	0	0	0	—	—	—	4m	7m 2t	—	—	2m 1t
11	Shaylee Bent	Wynnum Manly	Second-row	2019	1	3	1	0	4	2019	3	13	2	0	8	—	4m 1t	2m	7m 1t	6m	1m	—	4m
12	Talei Holmes	Cronulla	Second-row	2020	2	2	0	0	0	2020	2	7	0	0	0	—	—	3m	4m	11m 13t	—	1m	—
13	Kennedy Cherrington	Cronulla	Lock	2020	2	2	0	0	0	2020	2	9	0	0	0	—	—	4m	5m	10m 3t	1m	—	2m
14	Shirley Mailangi	South Sydney	interchange, Hooker	2021	2	2	0	0	0	2021	1	5	0	0	0	—	—	—	5m	11m 4t 1g	—	—	—
15	Fatafehi Hanisi	Mounties	interchange, Prop	—	1	1	0	0	0	—	0	0	0	0	0	—	—	—	—	2m	—	—	—
16	Christian Pio	Wests Tigers	interchange, Prop	2021	2	2	0	0	0	2021	1	4	2	0	8	—	—	—	4m 2t	10m 2t	—	—	—
17	Brooke Anderson	Cronulla	interchange	—	1	1	0	0	0	—	0	0	0	0	0	—	—	—	—	—	—	—	—
18	Tayla Preston	Wests Tigers	Five-eighth	—	1	1	0	0	0	—	0	0	0	0	0	—	—	—	—	6m 2t 6g	—	—	—
19	Rima Pirini Butler	Wentworthville	interchange, Prop	—	1	1	0	0	0	—	0	0	0	0	0	—	—	—	—	9m 3t	—	—	—
—	Jocephy Daniels	Mounties	Centre	2021	1	1	2	0	8	2021	1	3	0	0	0	—	—	—	3m	10m 12t	—	—	1m
—	Aliti Namoce Sagano	North Sydney	Second-row, Prop	2019	2	3	0	0	0	2019	2	7	0	0	0	—	3m	—	4m	6m 3t	—	—	—

=== Match details ===
14 May 2017

City Origin	20 – 8	Country Origin

North Sydney Oval,
North Sydney, New South Wales

15 May 2021
2:35 PM

City Origin	40 – 16	Country Origin
Tries: 9 Jessica Sergis 3 Shanice Parker 2 Jocephy Daniels 2 Tiana Penitani; Corban Baxter; Goals: 2 Maddie Studdon 2	Report	Tries: 3 Jocelyn Kelleher; Tayla Predebon; Rachael Pearson; Goals: 2 Rachael Pearson 2

Bankwest Stadium,
Parramatta, New South Wales
Referee: Cameron Turner
Player of the Match: Jessica Sergis

== 2017 final City vs Country Origin Match ==
=== Squad ===
City NSW rugby league team
2017 squad		Coaching staff
1 Matt Moylan – FB; 2 Clint Gutherson – WG; 3 Nathan Ross – CE; 4 Tyrone Peachey – CE; 5 Josh Addo-Carr – WG; 6 Bryce Cartwright – FE; 7 Chad Townsend – HB; 8 James Tamou – PR; 9 Cameron McInnes – HK; 10 Paul Gallen (c) – PR; 11 Curtis Sironen – SR; 12 David Gower – SR; 13 Hame Sele – LK	14 Joseph Paulo – PR; 15 Nathan Cleary – HB; 16 Pauli Pauli – SR; 17 Jake Marketo – SR	Head coach: Brad Fittler; Legend: (c) Captain(s); (vc) Vice-captain(s)

=== Match details ===
7 May 2017
4:00pm (AEST)

Country Origin	10 – 20	City Origin
Tries: Anthony Don (36') 1 Adam Elliott (58') 1 Goals: Michael Gordon 1/2 (38')		Tries: 1 (10') David Gower; 1 (49') James Tamou; 1 (80') Bryce Cartwright; Goals: 3/3 Clint Gutherson (12', 40' pen, 51'); 1/1 Paul Gallen (80')

Glen Willow Regional Sports Stadium,
Mudgee, New South Wales
Attendance: 8,322
Referee: Ashley Klein, Alan Shortall
Player of the Match: James Tamou

== See also ==
- List of New South Wales City Origin rugby league team players
- Brisbane rugby league team
- Newcastle rugby league team
- Country New South Wales rugby league team
