= Sydney Cricket Ground =

Stadium in Sydney, New South Wales

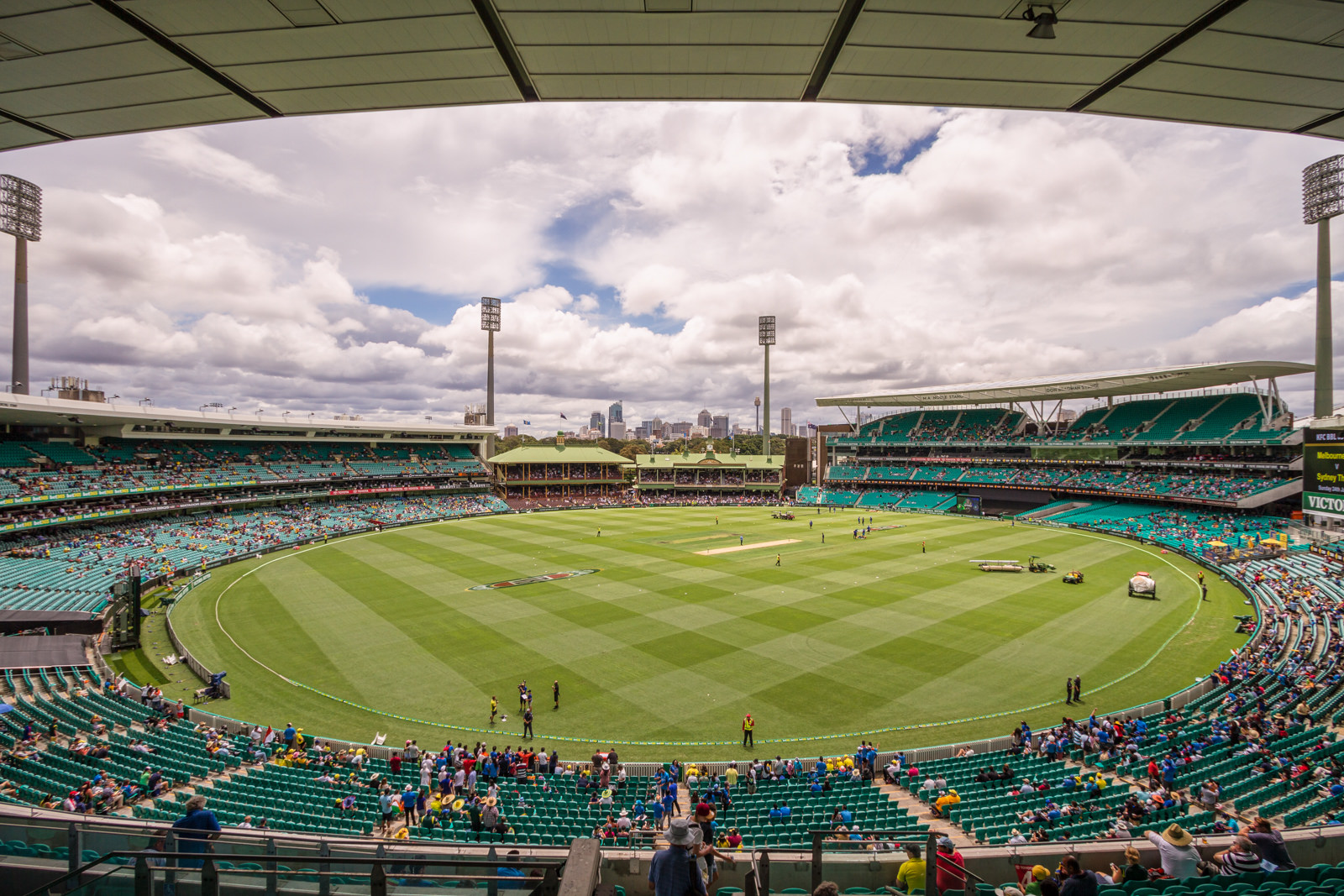
- The Sydney Cricket Ground in January 2016
- Interactive map of Sydney Cricket Ground

Ground information
- Location: Moore Park, Sydney, New South Wales
- Country: Australia
- Coordinates: 33°53′30″S 151°13′29″E
- Establishment: 1851; 175 years ago
- Capacity: 48,000
- Owner: Government of New South Wales via Venues NSW
- Operator: Venues NSW
- Tenants: Cricket; Australia national cricket team New South Wales cricket team Sydney Sixers (BBL); Sydney Sixers (WBBL); Australian Rules; Sydney Swans (AFL)
- End names
- Paddington End (Northern End) Randwick End (Southern End)

International information
- First men's Test: 17–21 February 1882: Australia v England
- Last men's Test: 3–7 January 2026: Australia v England
- First men's ODI: 13 January 1979: Australia v England
- Last men's ODI: 25 October 2025: Australia v India
- First men's T20I: 9 January 2007: Australia v England
- Last men's T20I: 9 November 2022: New Zealand v Pakistan
- First women's Test: 4–8 January 1935: Australia v England
- Last women's Test: 19–22 February 1949: Australia v England
- First women's ODI: 29 January 2000: Australia v England
- Last women's ODI: 12 December 2012: Australia v New Zealand
- First women's T20I: 15 February 2009: Australia v New Zealand
- Last women's T20I: 5 March 2020: Australia v South Africa

Team information
New South Wales Blues	(1878–present)
Sydney Swans (AFL)	(1982–present)
Sydney Sixers (BBL)	(2011–present)
Sydney Sixers (WBBL)	(2015–present)
NSW Waratahs (Super Rugby)	(2018–2022)
Sydney Roosters (NRL)	(2019–2022)
North Melbourne (AFL)	(1999–2002)
- As of 5 January 2025; Source: Cricinfo

The Sydney Cricket Ground (SCG) is a stadium located in the Sydney suburb of Moore Park. It is primarily used for Australian rules football and cricket as the home ground of the Sydney Swans in the Australian Football League (AFL), the Sydney Sixers in the Big Bash League (BBL) and the New South Wales cricket team in the Sheffield Shield. It also frequently hosts the Australian national cricket team. Over the 20th century the SCG was the primary venue for both rugby union and rugby league. The stadium is managed by Venues NSW.

== History ==
=== Beginning ===
In 1811, the Governor of New South Wales, Lachlan Macquarie, established the second Sydney Common, about one-and-a-half miles (about 2,400m) wide and extending south from South Head Road (now Oxford St) to where Randwick Racecourse is today. Part sandhills, part swamp and situated on the south-eastern fringe of the city, it was used as a rubbish dump in the 1850s, and not regarded as an ideal place for sport. In 1851, part of the Sydney Common south of Victoria Barracks was granted to the British Army for use as a garden and cricket ground for the soldiers. Its first user was the 11th North Devonshire Regiment which flattened and graded the southern part of the rifle range adjacent to the Barracks.

In the next couple of years, the teams from Victoria Barracks combined themselves into a more permanent organisation and called themselves the Garrison Club. The ground therefore became known as the Garrison Ground when it was first opened in February 1854.

Up until that time Hyde Park had been the main sporting and racing ground in the colony but when it was dedicated as public gardens in 1856 city cricketers and footballers had to find somewhere else to play.

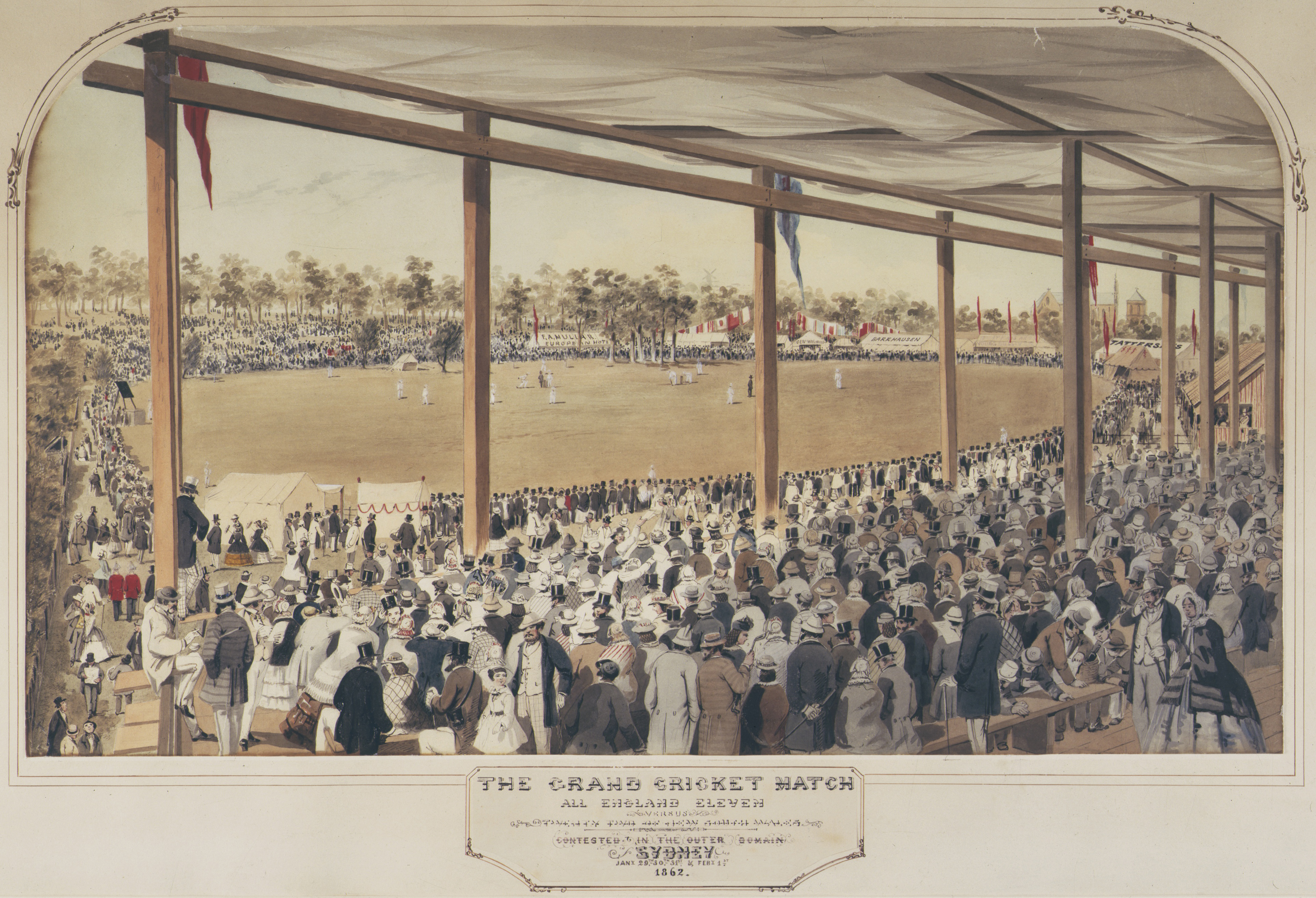
Cricket match, England eleven v Twenty-two of New South Wales, Sydney, 1862. Watercolour by S. T. Gill.

In the late 1860s another part of the Sydney Common, the area west of the Garrison Ground to the then Dowling Street, was opened for public recreation. It was named Moore Park after the Mayor of Sydney, Charles Moore, who planted a number of Moreton Bay fig trees, which exist to this day. As well as the location of Sydney's first zoo, Moore Park was a regular venue for games between Sydney rugby clubs Sydney University FC and Wallaroo FC. Sydney at the time was a small, dense city and best navigated on foot and Moore Park was on the outskirts. It was not liked so much by cricketers because it was too far from the city.

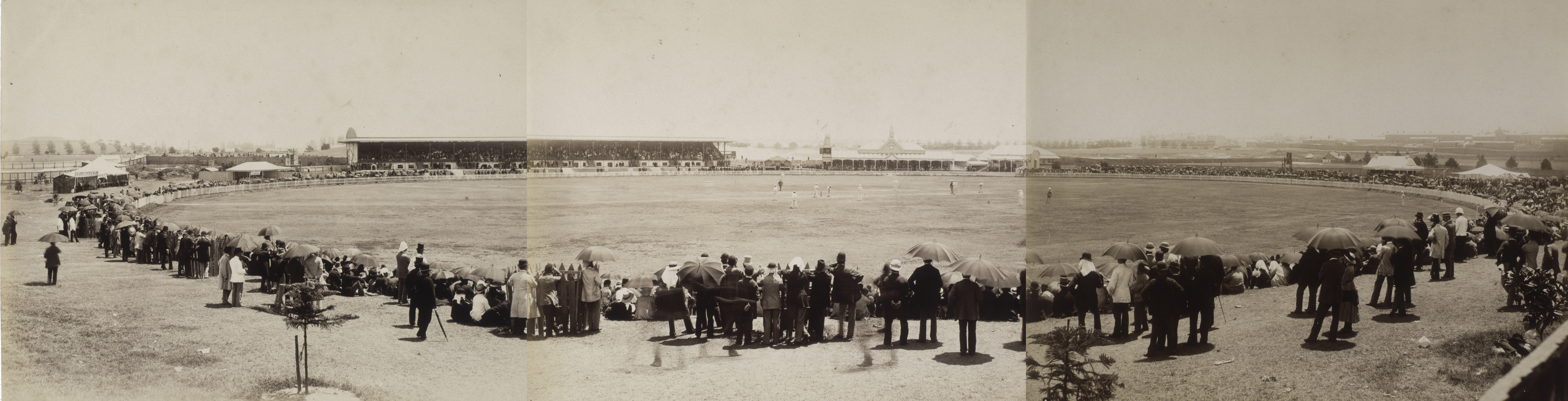
England v. Australia cricket match at the Sydney Cricket Ground, 27 January 1883

When the commander of the Sydney garrison, Lieutenant-Colonel John Richardson, aligned his soldiers to the East Sydney Cricket Club, the Garrison Ground became known as the Civil and Military Ground. In 1870 British troops left Victoria Barracks and the future of the Civil and Military Ground became uncertain. However, with the closure of the Albert Ground in the 1870s, the NSW Cricket Association (NSWCA) began regular use of the Civil and Military Ground. The colony's first rugby union game was played at the ground in June 1870 between the Wallaroo FC and a team of British 'Army & Navy' men.

In 1875, the NSW Government began to upgrade the ground. Despite efforts by Victoria Barracks and then the Carlingford, Redfern, Fitzroy and Albert cricket clubs to take control, the then president of the NSWCA, Richard Driver (after whom Driver Avenue outside the ground is named), persuaded the government to let the NSWCA look after the ground's administration. In 1876, the ground was dedicated by Governor Sir Hercules Robinson.

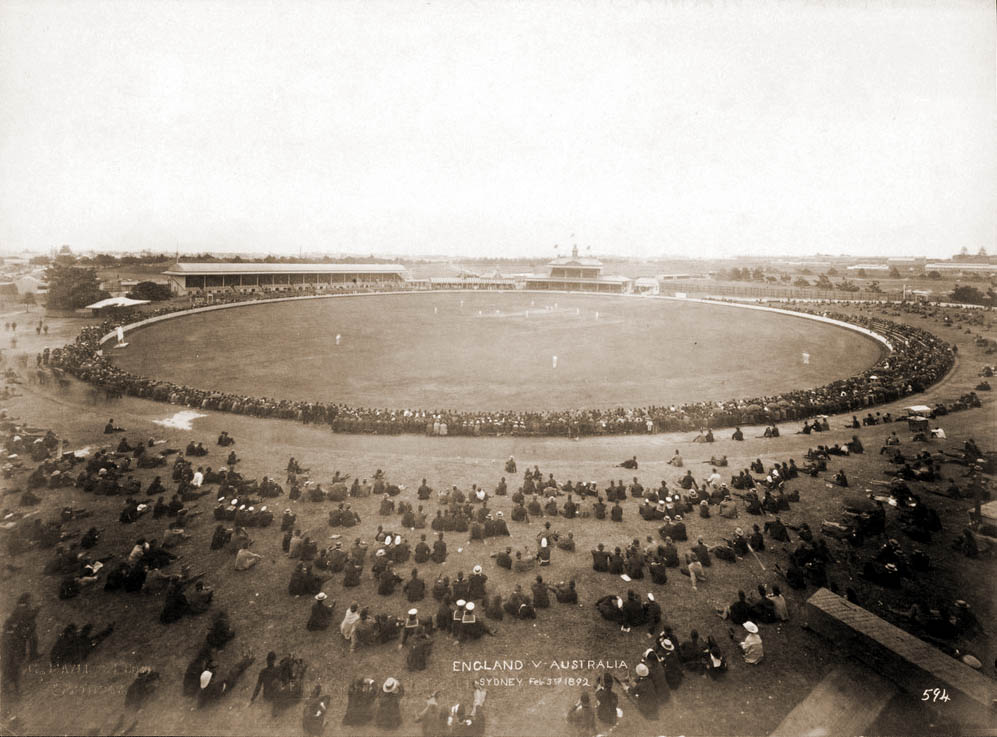
The Cricket Ground in 1892

The NSWCA had influential supporters. Driver himself was a prominent MP and solicitor for the City of Sydney Council. The Minister for Lands, Thomas Garrett, was also supportive; his son was about to break into the colonial side. It is hardly surprising therefore that within a couple of years of the NSWCA taking control of the ground, the governor, Sir Hercules Robinson, appointed Driver himself, William W. Stephen and Phillip Sheridan (after whom a grandstand was named), the first trustees. Two trustees were appointed by the government and one by the NSWCA. The close relationship between the Trust and the NSWCA is evidenced by the fact that they pooled funds for the next six years. The military's link with the ground was finally severed when John Richardson and the Sydney garrison went to fight in the Sudan. The trustees renamed the ground the Association Ground.

In 1883 the most prominent trustee, Sheridan, regarding the ground as the responsibility of the trustees, began to act independently of the NSWCA, resulting in the NSWCA losing control of the ground. Over the next century there was constant conflict between the Trust and the NSWCA over whether other sports such as rugby, tennis and cycling, the organisers of which were all keen to use the venue, had access to it. One conflict in 1904, over the Trust's plan to hold a cycling event which clashed with a cricket match, ended up in court. The NSWCA's influence was eventually reduced even further over the years due to changes in the way the State Government appointed trustees.

=== Development ===
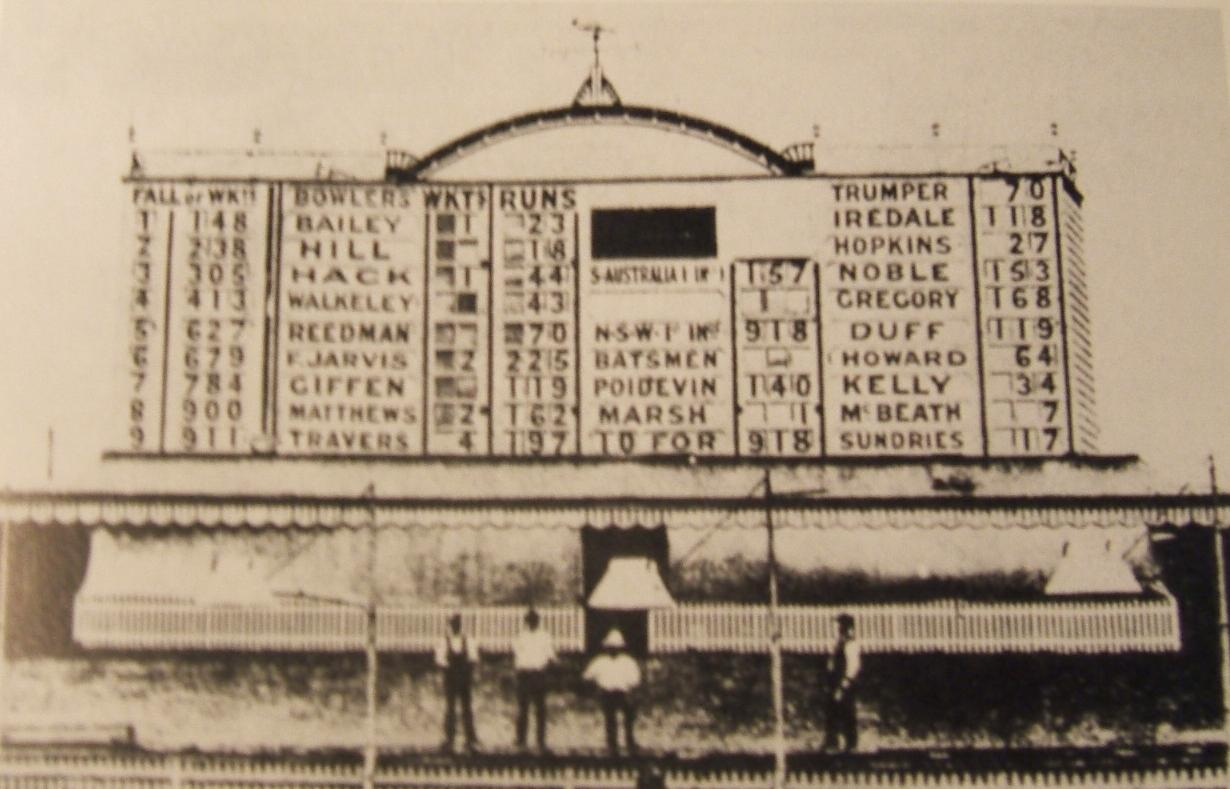
The SCG scoreboard in January 1901

By the time of the first Sydney cricket test in February 1882, the ground could boast two grandstands; the Brewongle Stand at the southern end and the original Members' Stand, which had been built in 1878 in the north west corner where the current Members' Stand now sits. On opposite sides of the ground to the stands two spectator mounds were built. They became known as The Hill and the Paddington Hill.

In 1886, the Members' Pavilion was rebuilt at a cost of £6,625. Membership was levied at two guineas.

In 1881 a loop in the tram line, which ran down Randwick Road (now Anzac Parade), was built to service the Ground and the Pastoral and Agricultural Society Ground (later the RAS Showgrounds and now Fox Studios) next door.

In 1894 the ground finally received its modern name, the Sydney Cricket Ground, which was followed by the opening of the Hill Stand, situated between The Hill and the Paddington Hill. It became known as the Bob Stand during the Depression years because it cost one shilling (a bob) to enter.

The first SCG scoreboard was built in the two weeks leading up to the 1895–1896 inter-colonial match between New South Wales and Victoria. Although it was Sheridan's idea, the design was Ned Gregory's who believed that English scoreboards were inadequate. Requiring two men to operate it, the new scoreboard was hailed as one of the wonders of the cricket world. Boards with players' names on them were placed in different slits alongside scrolls of canvas with numbers painted on them which were rolled up and down to show the changing score. Under the scoreboard was a refreshment stall which sold, among other things, oysters. In 1897 the scoreboard displaying player names enabled the first use of numbered jerseys and selling of a match program in a rugby union game between NSW (Waratahs) and New Zealand (All Blacks).

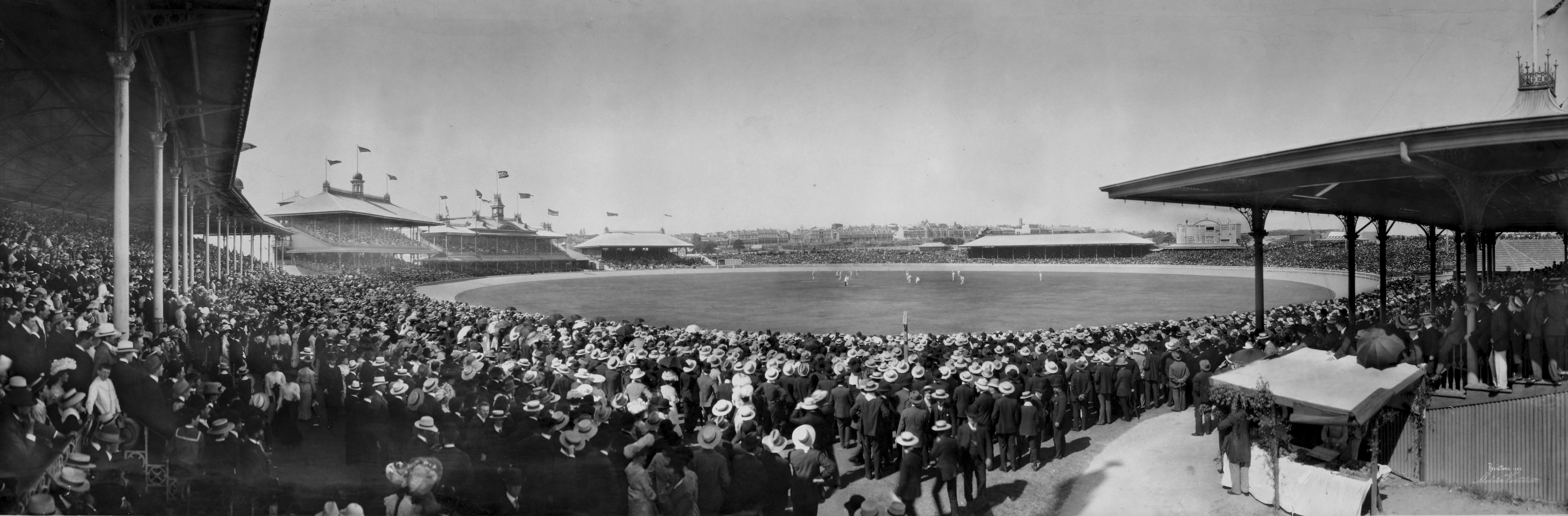
Sydney Cricket Ground on 12 December 1903

In 1896 the Ladies' Stand was opened, along with a concrete cycling track which circled the inside of the ground. One of the carpenters who built the formwork for the track was George Bradman, father of Don Bradman. In 1898 floodlights were built over the cycling track so that night events could be held. In 1904 the scoreboard was rebuilt at the top of The Hill and in 1909 the Sheridan Stand, named after Phil Sheridan, was opened at the southern end, replacing the earlier Smokers' Stand.

In the period up to World War I the SCG was used for a wide variety of sports including rugby union, athletics, tennis, baseball, football and cycling. The cycling track however was removed in 1920. In 1924 Ned Gregory's scoreboard was closed and the concrete scoreboard at the back of the Hill opened.

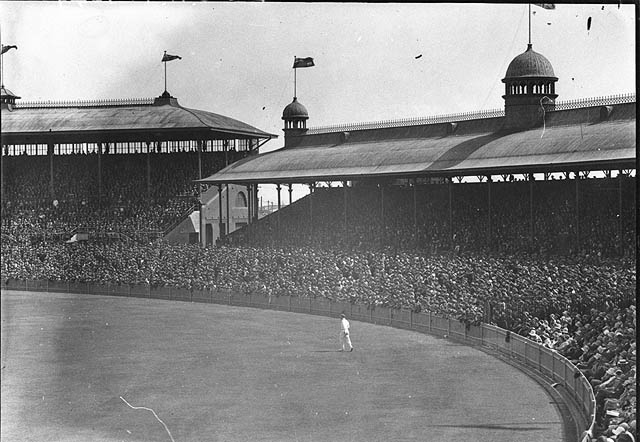
A crowded SCG during a 1930s cricket match

During the 1920s and 1930s cricket crowds packed into the SCG to see Don Bradman play for New South Wales and Australia. Many of the huge gate takings that Bradman brought in for the NSWCA were spent on developing the ground.

In 1932 a crowd of 70,204 attended a rugby league match between Australia (Kangaroos) and England in the first test of the 1932 Ashes series at the Cricket Ground. This meant at the time the SCG and rugby league held the record for the highest single-day attendance of any cricket or football match (any code) yet seen in Australia.

A large new stand was built at the northern end in two stages. It replaced the Northern Stand and was intended to also replace the Members' and Ladies' Stands. The first stage, begun while Bradman was still playing for New South Wales, was opened in 1936 at a cost of £90,000 and named the 'M.A. Noble Stand' after the great Australian captain Monty Noble. The second stage, completed in 1973 at a cost of $2 million, was named the Bradman Stand after the great man himself.

Further redevelopment of the ground began in 1978 with the advent of World Series Cricket (WSC) and games played at night. When media giant Kerry Packer failed to obtain the television broadcast rights for cricket, he bought the top 30–40 players in the world and staged his own competition, World Series Cricket.

Packer applied to use the SCG for WSC in 1977 but the SCG Trust, which administered the ground, refused. However the NSW Labor Government, under Premier Neville Wran, amended the Sydney Sports Ground and Cricket Ground Act to remove the Trust's power to decide who played at the SCG and the NSWCA's traditional right over the ground. A new Trust was established with 12 members appointed by the Government and two elected by SCG members. The new Trust had no WSC opponents, and although legal action by the NSWCA stopped WSC games being played at the SCG in 1977, they were played there in 1978.

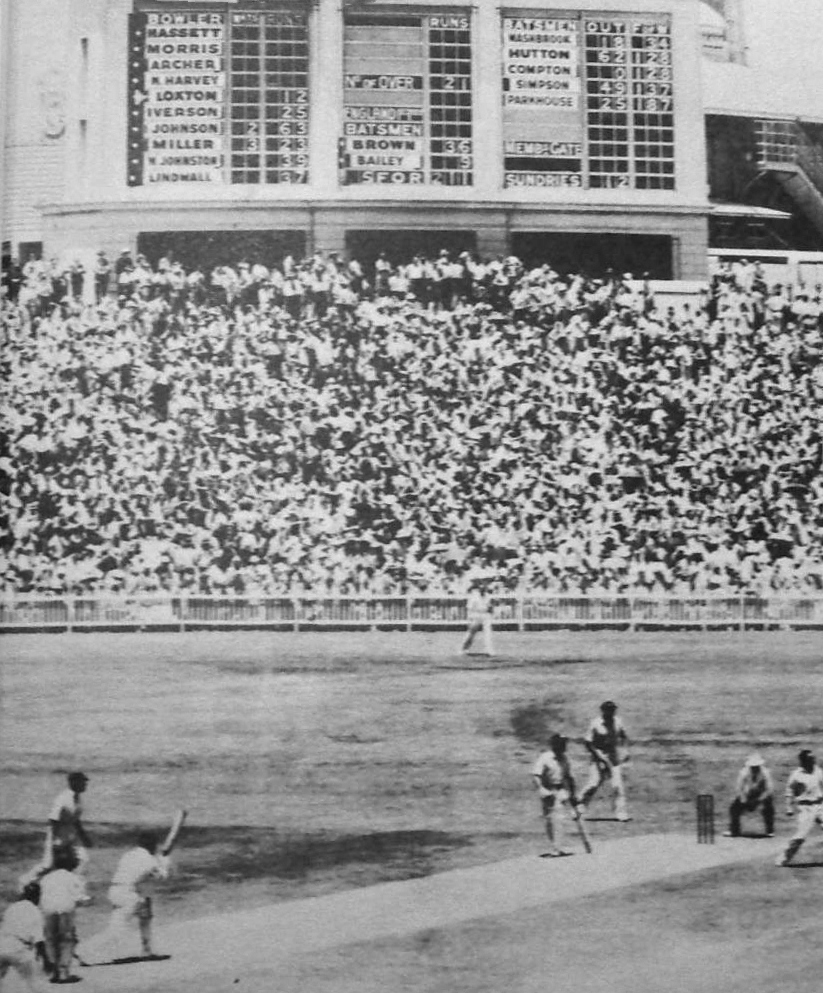
The SCG scoreboard in 1950

In the years since WSC the character of the SCG has somewhat changed. Six light towers were built in 1978 at a cost of $1.2 million so that cricket could be played at night, and two huge new stands were constructed at the southern end of the ground. The new Brewongle Stand was built on the site of the old Brewongle Stand at a cost $8.9 million and opened in 1980. The Churchill Stand, named after rugby league legend Clive Churchill, replaced the Sheridan Stand at a cost of $8.2 million and was opened in 1986.

The old concrete scoreboard was closed in 1983 and a new electronic board erected above The Hill. This board allowed the crowd to see video replays and provided more scope for advertising. The old concrete scoreboard from 1923 sat behind the Doug Walters Stand unused until 2006 when it was dismantled and stored offsite to make way for the Victor Trumper Stand.

The Bob Stand has been moved to North Sydney Oval, replaced by the Bill O'Reilly Stand. This stand was originally named the Pat Hills Stand, after the NSW Labor Government Minister and SCG Trust member, when it was opened in 1984 alongside the Paddington Stand, later known as the Dally Messenger Stand. However, the incoming Greiner Government changed the name of the former to the O'Reilly Stand after the legendary spin bowler.

The Hill also has gone but the reason for that is a little harder to pin. Up until 1991 the Hill was a grassy slope without seating. It was the 'outer ground' costing the least to get in and attracting working class patronage. The invention of the beer can and the portable cooler in the 1960s increased alcohol consumption at cricket matches which in turn fuelled bad crowd behaviour. In the 1970s the advent of limited overs games held partially at night attracted a different kind of crowd to cricket at the SCG. They were less interested in the subtleties of the game and more in the excitement and spectacle. Brawling and excessive drinking were features of the crowd on the Hill at this time. Even the introduction of individual seating on the Hill in 1991 failed to completely eradicate crowd misbehaviour. Stricter measures such as banning alcohol were later implemented with greater success.

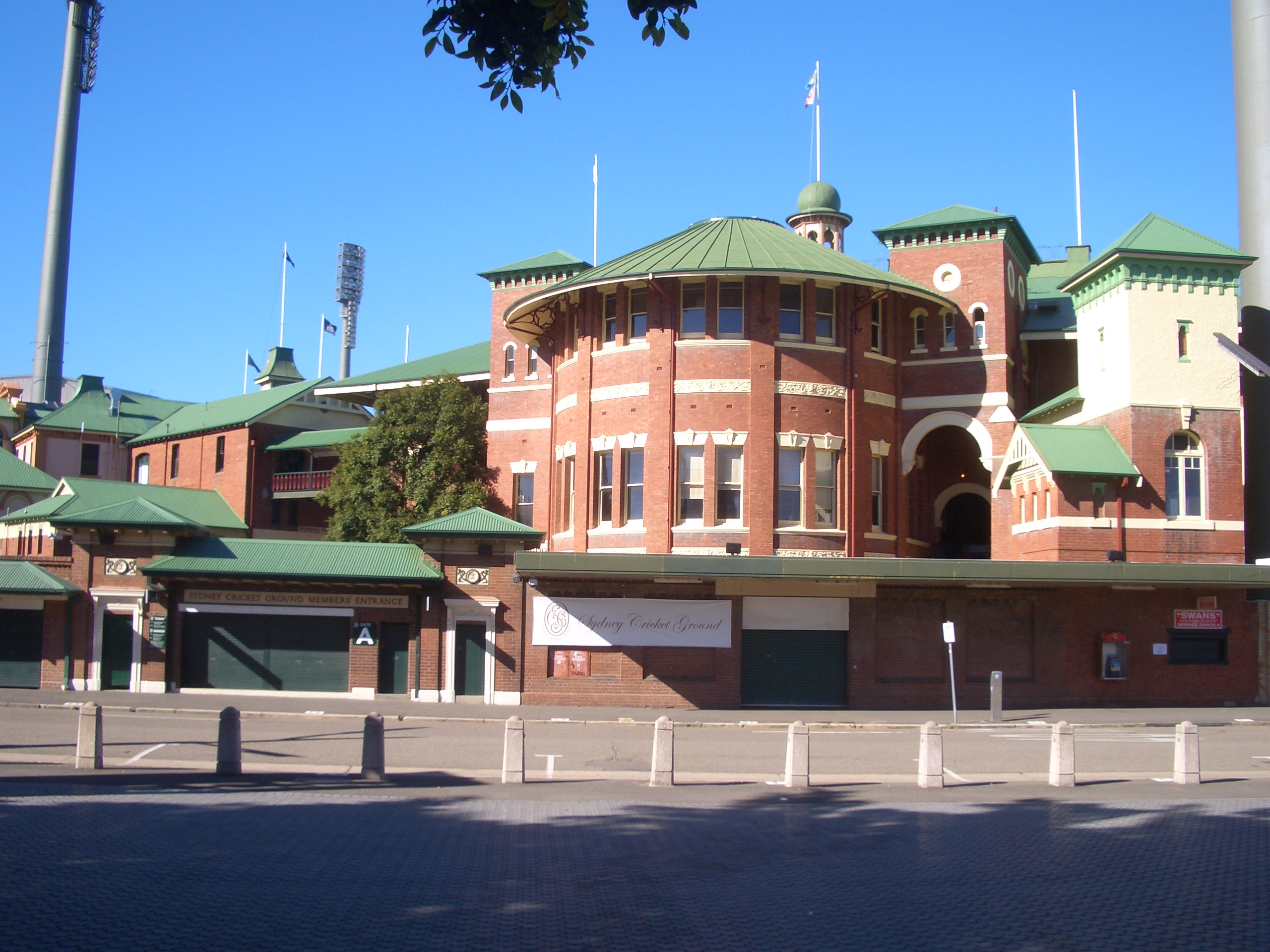
Sydney Cricket Ground members entrance, 2007

Further developments have taken place in more recent years with the internal reconstruction of the M.A. Noble stand completed in 1994 and the opening of the NSW Cricket Centre in 1997. This facility includes indoor training wickets and administrative offices for Cricket NSW (formerly NSW Cricket Association). In 1999 the original electronic scoreboard was replaced by a new higher-definition video screen. In the 21st century the Hill and Doug Walters Stand has been completely redeveloped with a new 12,000 seat Victor Trumper Stand, completed in 2008. This stand brings the SCG's capacity to 46,000 spectators. During the re-development, the 2 original light towers on the hill were replaced and the 4 other light towers were upgraded, a new video screen was also installed in the Clive Churchill stand, replacing the screen that was on the hill.

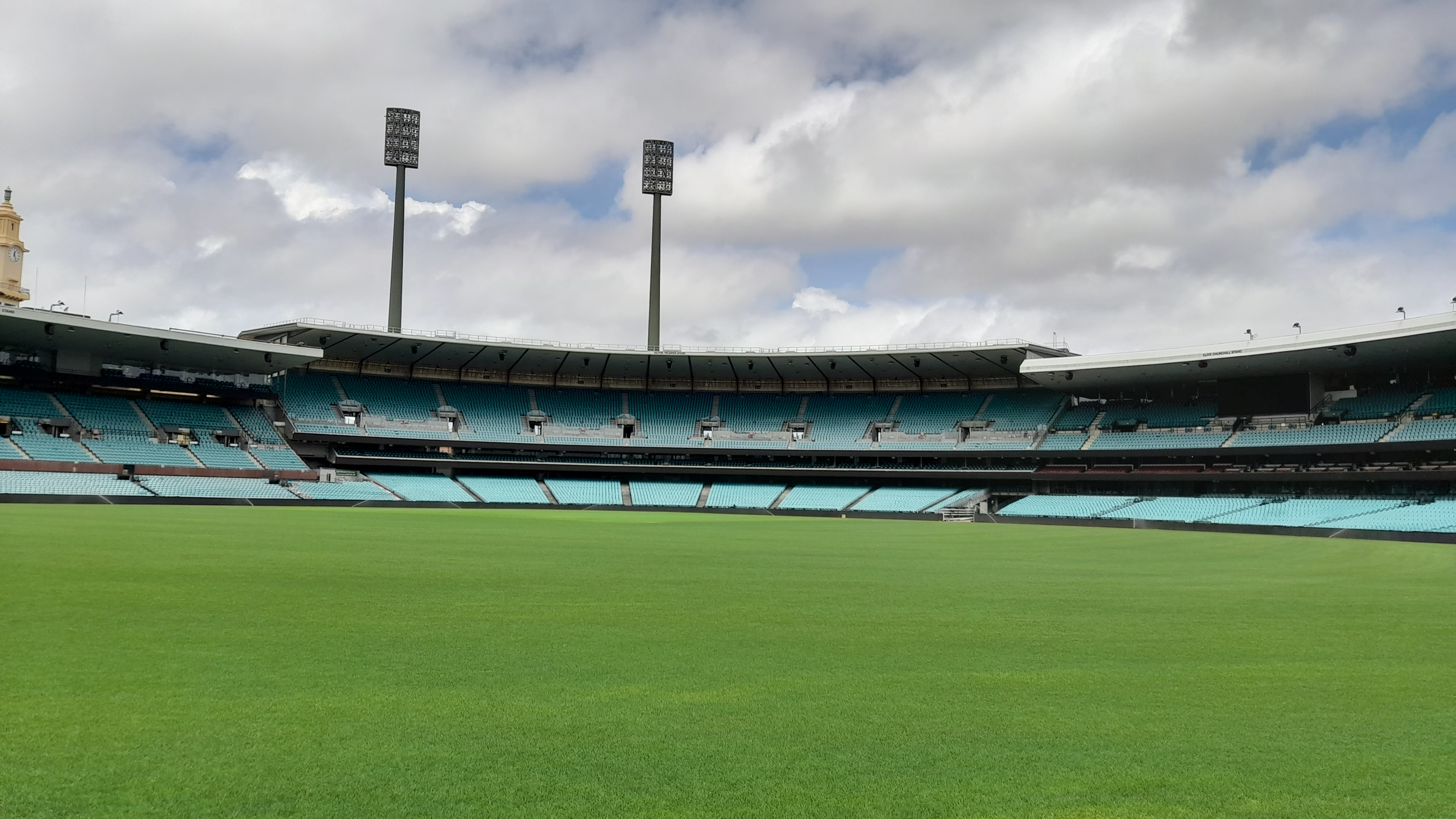
The Victor Trumper Stand in 2023 as viewed from the Members Pavilion

The SCG Trust rebuilt the MA Noble, Don Bradman and Dally Messenger stands for the 2013–14 Ashes series, it increased ground capacity to 48,000 spectators. This redevelopment was mostly completed in March 2014 at a cost of $197.5 million and also included a large new video screen in the Messenger Stand.

In September 2018, construction began on a new video screen to replace the video screen at the Messenger Stand with the LED panels for the screen transferred across from the Sydney Football Stadium with an upgrade to the video screen in the Clive Churchill Stand and new LED advertising banners being installed in all of the stands except for the Members' and Ladies' pavilions. The work was completed in time for Sydney FC's first ever A-League game at the SCG.

Since 2015, the Trust, now Venues NSW, are keen on redeveloping the Bill O'Reilly stand, and later the Churchill and Brewongle stands, further increasing the grounds capacity. The ground will be a near complete modern "bowl" stadium with the exception of the two heritage listed Members' and Ladies' pavilions.

== Stands ==
In its present configuration, the SCG is a playing field surrounded by a collection of separate grandstand structures. From the northern end, clockwise, they are:

- M.A Noble, Bradman and Dally Messenger stands: The largest structure at the ground, was constructed in 2013–2014, although hosting three named 'stands' is one integrated grandstand. The stand contains corporate boxes, media facilities, a changeroom used by visiting AFL and NRL teams and members seating for SCG (formerly SCG Trust) members and in the winter is shared with eligible Swans members as well as public reserved seating in the Bradman and Messenger stands. The Dally Messenger Stand is also home to the main video screen for the ground. The new stand replaced the older Noble and Bradman stands in the same location with the clock tower of the original Noble stand preserved.
- Bill O'Reilly Stand (previously named Pat Hills Stand): Constructed 1984, replaced the 'Bob' stand, with corporate boxes and public reserved seating.
- Victor Trumper Stand: Constructed in 2007–2008, replaced Yabba's Hill and Doug Walters Stand, with corporate boxes and public reserved and unreserved seating.
- Clive Churchill Stand: Constructed 1986, with corporate boxes and public reserved seating. It also housed the Sydney Swans training and administration facilities before those were moved to the Royal Hall of Industries Building in the former Sydney Showground precinct in 2023.
- Brewongle Stand: Constructed 1980 with corporate boxes, media facilities and public reserved seating. It was previously thought that the stand was named after the aboriginal word for "camping place". However the stand was named after a tea room at the Sydney Cricket Ground. The Sydney Swans changerooms are located beneath the Brewongle stand.

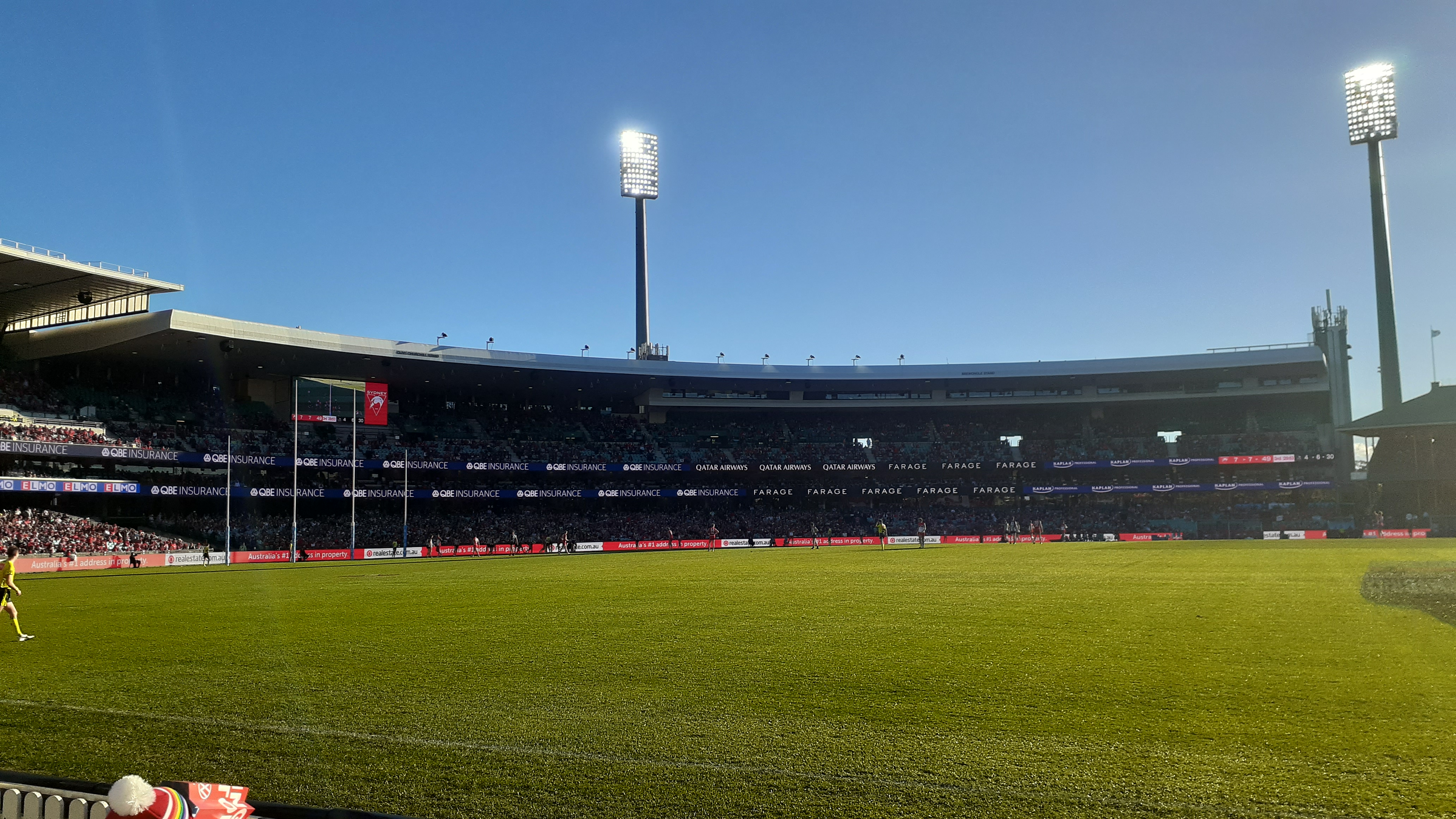
The Brewongle and Clive Churchill stands during Sydney Swans vs Collingwood in May 2021.

- Ladies' Pavilion: Constructed 1896, originally for female-only members' seating; also used for general public admission during events with low attendance. Now general members seating. Referred to as the Jane Mcgrath Stand on day three of the annual Sydney Test, also known as Mcgrath Day or Pink day.
- Members' Pavilion: A cast iron, brick and corrugated iron structure with clock tower constructed in 1878 for SCG Members' seating, housing dressing rooms used by Australian and New South Wales cricket teams and visiting cricket teams. Extensions were made to the pavilion in 1903.

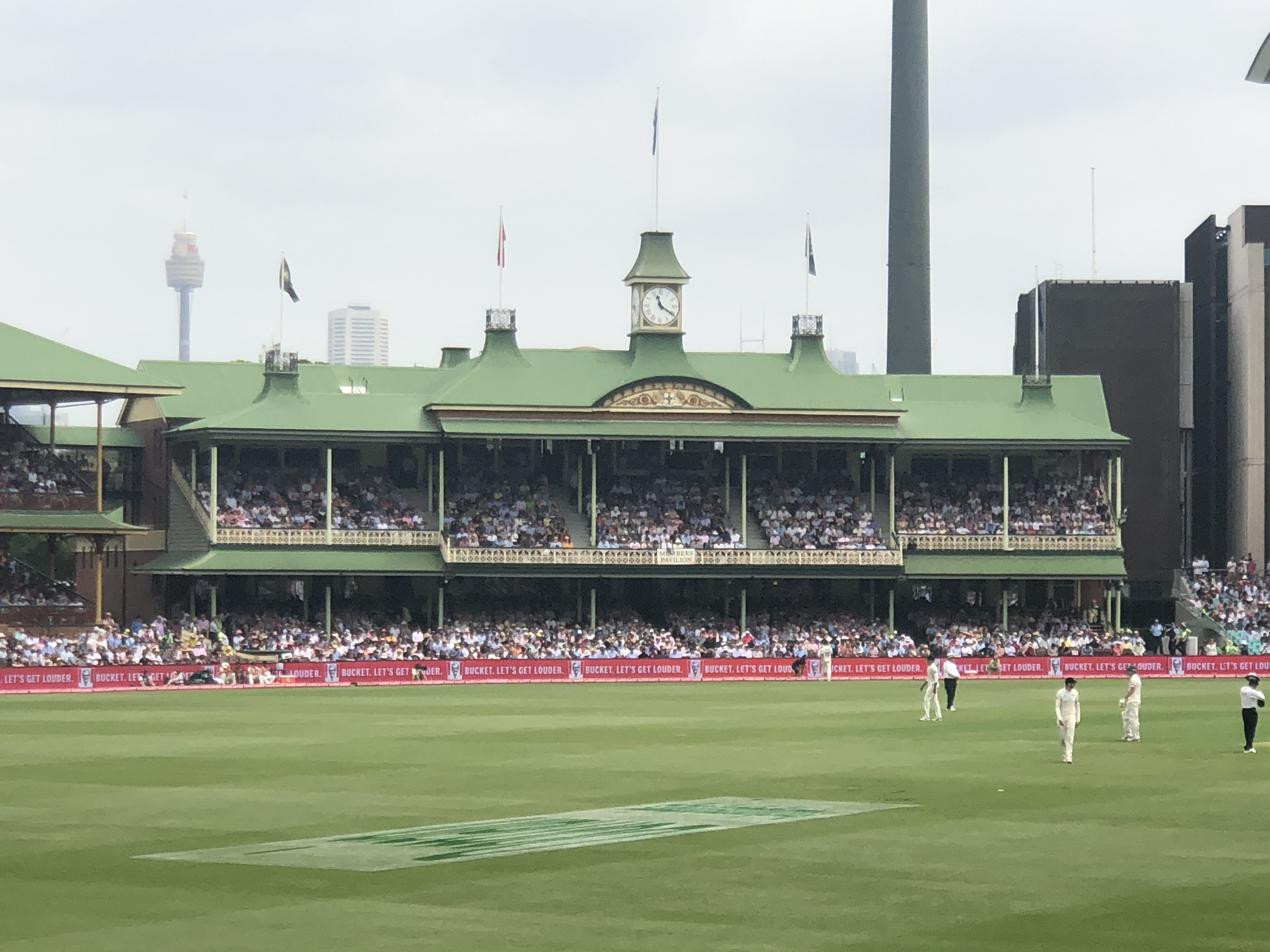
Heritage–listed Members Pavilion, 3 January 2020

== Sydney Cricket Ground Trust ==
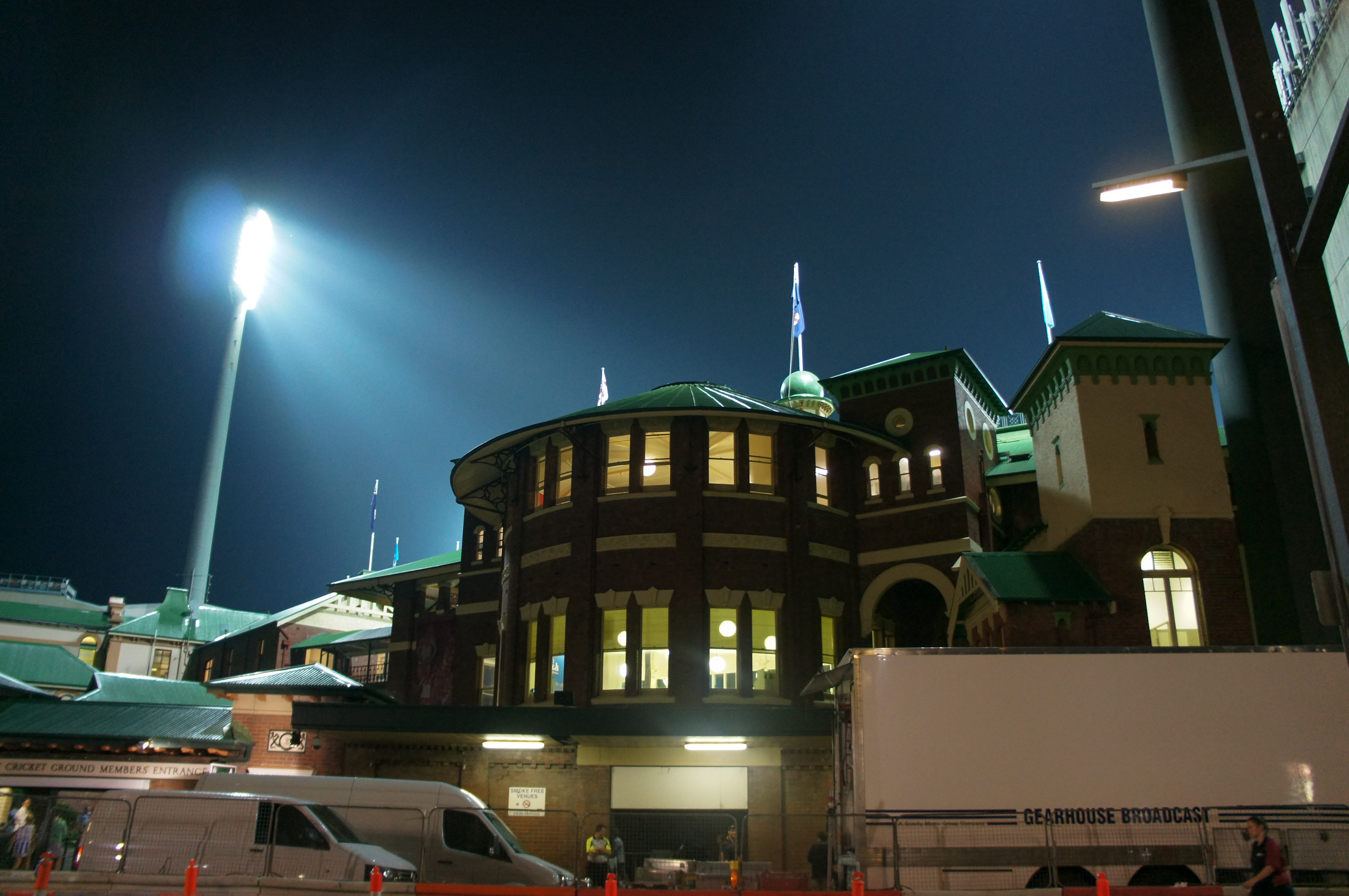
The Sydney Cricket Ground at night after a rugby match

The Sydney Cricket and Sports Ground Trust (popularly known as the Sydney Cricket Ground Trust) was the agency that operated the Sydney Cricket Ground and the old Sydney Football Stadium at Moore Park. In mid-2008, its head office The Sheridan Building is opened, making it the third building to erect in the Gold Members Car Park, alongside the Headquarters of Sydney Roosters and New South Wales Rugby Union. The trust was merged into Venues NSW, which now operates the SCG as well as the new Sydney Football Stadium.

Soon after it opened Sydney FC relocated their Headquarters inside the Sheridan Building. The Sydney Swans headquarters are located in the SCG accessible from Driver Avenue. In total, there are 4 different clubs from 4 different codes of sport with their headquarters reside at the ground.

=== Sculptures ===
The Trust commissioned ten bronze sculptures to be placed around the grounds of the SCG and SFS.

Order	Date	Honouree	Sport, location	Notes
1	4 January 2008	Richie Benaud OBE	Cricket, bowler	
2	20 March 2008	Dally Messenger	Rugby League, located outside of the SFS	
3	5 January 2009	Fred Spofforth	Cricket, fast bowler	
4	5 June 2009	Trevor Allan	Rugby union and rugby league footballer	
5	29 August 2009	Paul Roos	Australian rules football	
6	7 December 2009	Stephen Yabba Gascoigne	Famous spectator	Located inside the grounds, taking over two seats on the concourse in front of the new Victor Trumper stand.
7	5 January 2010	Stan McCabe	Cricket, batsman	
8	9 August 2010	Reg Gasnier AM	Rugby league	Part of the Basil Sellers Sports Sculpture project.
		Ken Catchpole OAM	Rugby union	Relocated in 2017 to outside the Rugby Australia House
		Paul Kelly	Australian rules football	
		Steve Waugh AO	Cricket	
12	2016	Johnny Warren MBE, OAM	Football	
13	3 January 2018	Betty Cuthbert and Marlene Mathews	Athletics	The first female athletes to be honoured.

=== Media Hall of Honour ===
In 2014 the Sydney Cricket and Sports Ground Trust opened the Media Hall of Honour at the MA Noble Stand's media centre with fifteen inaugural inductees: Another twelve names were added to the list in December 2021.

- Richie Benaud OBE (Cricket commentator and broadcaster)
- Ernest 'Tiger' Black BEM (Rugby League commentator)
- Gordon Bray AM (Rugby commentator)
- Ernest Christensen (Sports journalist)
- John Corbett 'JC' Davis (Sports journalist)
- Claude Corbett (Rugby League writer)
- Jack Fingleton OBE (Cricket writer)
- Herb Fishwick (Photographer)
- Mike Gibson (Journalist and broadcaster)
- Tom Goodman (Sports journalist)
- Ray Hadley OAM (Commentator and broadcaster)
- Ian Heads OAM (Rugby League writer)
- Frank Hyde MBE, OAM (Rugby League writer and commentator)
- Norman May AM (Sports commentator)
- Jim Maxwell AM (Cricket commentator)
- Alan McGilvray AM, MBE (Cricket commentator)
- Rex Mossop (Rugby League commentator)
- AG 'Johnny' Moyes MBE, MC (Cricket writer and commentator)
- Les Murray AM (Football commentator and broadcaster)
- John O'Gready (Sports photographer)
- Kerry Packer AC (Media owner)
- Bill O'Reilly OBE (Cricket writer)
- Ray Robinson (Cricket writer)
- Jim Shepherd (Journalist and broadcaster)
- Debbie Spillane AM (Broadcaster)
- Ray Warren OAM (Rugby League commentator)
- Rebecca Wilson (Sports writer and broadcaster)

=== Other tributes ===
On 24 April 2023, the Sydney Cricket Ground unveiled a set of gates named after Indian Test cricketer Sachin Tendulkar and West Indian Test cricketer Brian Lara on the occasion of Tendulkar's 50th birthday and the 30th anniversary of Lara's innings of 277 at the ground. The Lara–Tendulkar Gates are used by visiting teams entering the playing field from the Members' Pavilion visitors dressing room.

The Australian and New South Wales cricket teams enter the playing field through the Don Bradman Gates between the Members' and Ladies' Pavilions. The Arthur Morris and Alan Davidson Gates are located on Driver Avenue in the brick wall north of the SCG Members Entrance. The two separate steel gates are designed with SCG, AKD and ARM monograms in the metalwork.

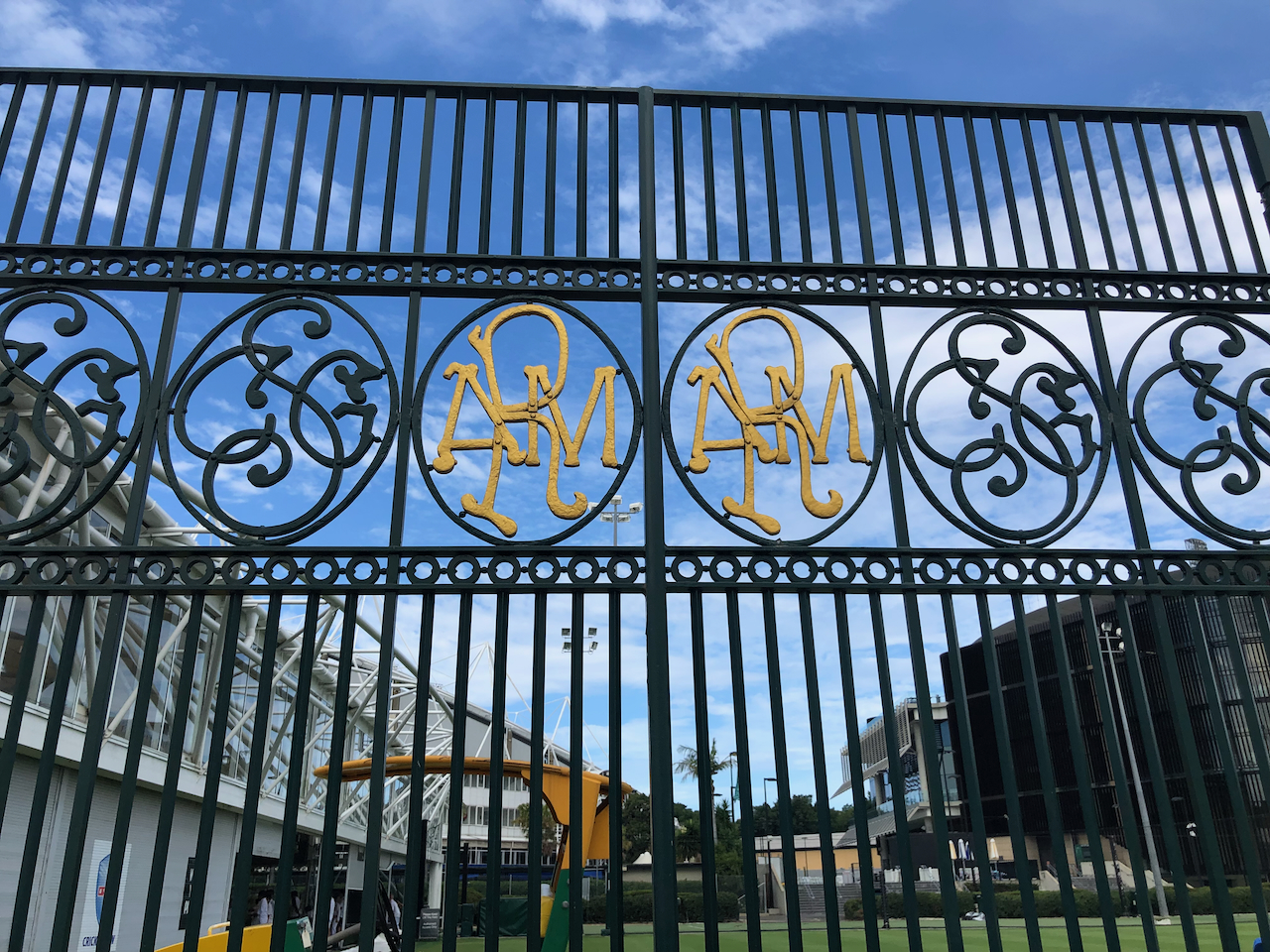
Arthur (Robert) Morris Gates, SCG, Driver Avenue, Moore Park

== Cricket ==
=== Nature of pitch ===
Sydney Cricket Ground is traditionally one of the most spin-friendly international cricket grounds in Australia, because the soil and foundation of the pitch and playing surface is primarily 'Bulli soil' from Bulli, New South Wales. The SCG along with the Gabba in Brisbane are the only major test venues in Australia not to have switched to a drop-in pitch.

=== History and notable events ===
In 1854 the Garrison Club defeated the Royal Victoria Club in the first recorded cricket match to be played at what was then the Garrison Ground. Although games were played at the Domain, the Garrison Ground was used for practice by the NSW cricket team in 1860 and by the Victorian team in 1861 the before inter-colonial matches in those years.

Cricket was first played in Australia in Sydney's Hyde Park in 1803. However, up until the appointment of trustees to look after the SCG in the late 1870s, several different grounds had been used. The Domain was first used for inter-colonial games and then the Albert Ground in Redfern but in time both became unavailable, the Domain because of its poor condition and because it could not be fenced in and the Albert Ground because it closed in the late 1870s.

After the closure of the Albert Ground the New South Wales Cricket Association began using the Association Ground. The first game played there was the final of the Civil Service Challenge Cup on 25 October 1877, between the New South Wales Government Printing Office and the Audit Office. The first first-class match was the inter-colonial game between New South Wales and Victoria played on 22, 23 and 25 February 1878 where New South Wales won by 1 wicket.

During the 1878–79 season Lord Harris' England team toured Australia. The feature of the tourists game against New South Wales at the SCG in 1879 was a riot sparked apparently when the crowd disagreed with an umpiring decision by George Coulthard that went against the locals. Lord Harris believed the invasion of the ground by about 2000 spectators was actually started by bookmakers in the stand. One of the umpires for the match was Edmund Barton, later to become Australia's first Prime Minister.

By the time its first Test match was played at the SCG between 17 February and 21 February 1882 the ground was in fine condition. The NSWCA had appointed Ned Gregory as curator and given him a cottage next to the ground for him and his family. Australia won that game by overhauling England's scores of 133 and 232 with scores of 197 and 5 for 169.

The ground high score in Test cricket was held for more than a century by Englishman Reg "Tip" Foster, who scored 287 in an Australia-England match in 1903. In the 100th test to be played at the SCG in January 2012, Michael Clarke was joined first by Ricky Ponting in a partnership of 288 and then by Michael Hussey in a partnership of 334 and built a score of 329 not out against India.

Don Bradman made his first visit to the ground in the 1920–21 season to watch the Fifth Test of the Australia and England series. In that game Charlie Macartney scored 170 to help seal a win for Australia.

Bradman scored the highest ever first-class innings of 452 at the SCG for New South Wales against Queensland in 1928–29. This record was surpassed by Hanif Mohammad who scored 499 run out at Karachi. It was further bettered by the West Indian Brian Lara who scored 501 in 1994 at Edgbaston.

The 1928–29 season was a big one for cricket. On 15 December, the largest ever crowd to attend a cricket match at the SCG, 58,446, saw Australia and England play. With changes to the ground seating the record is unlikely to be beaten.

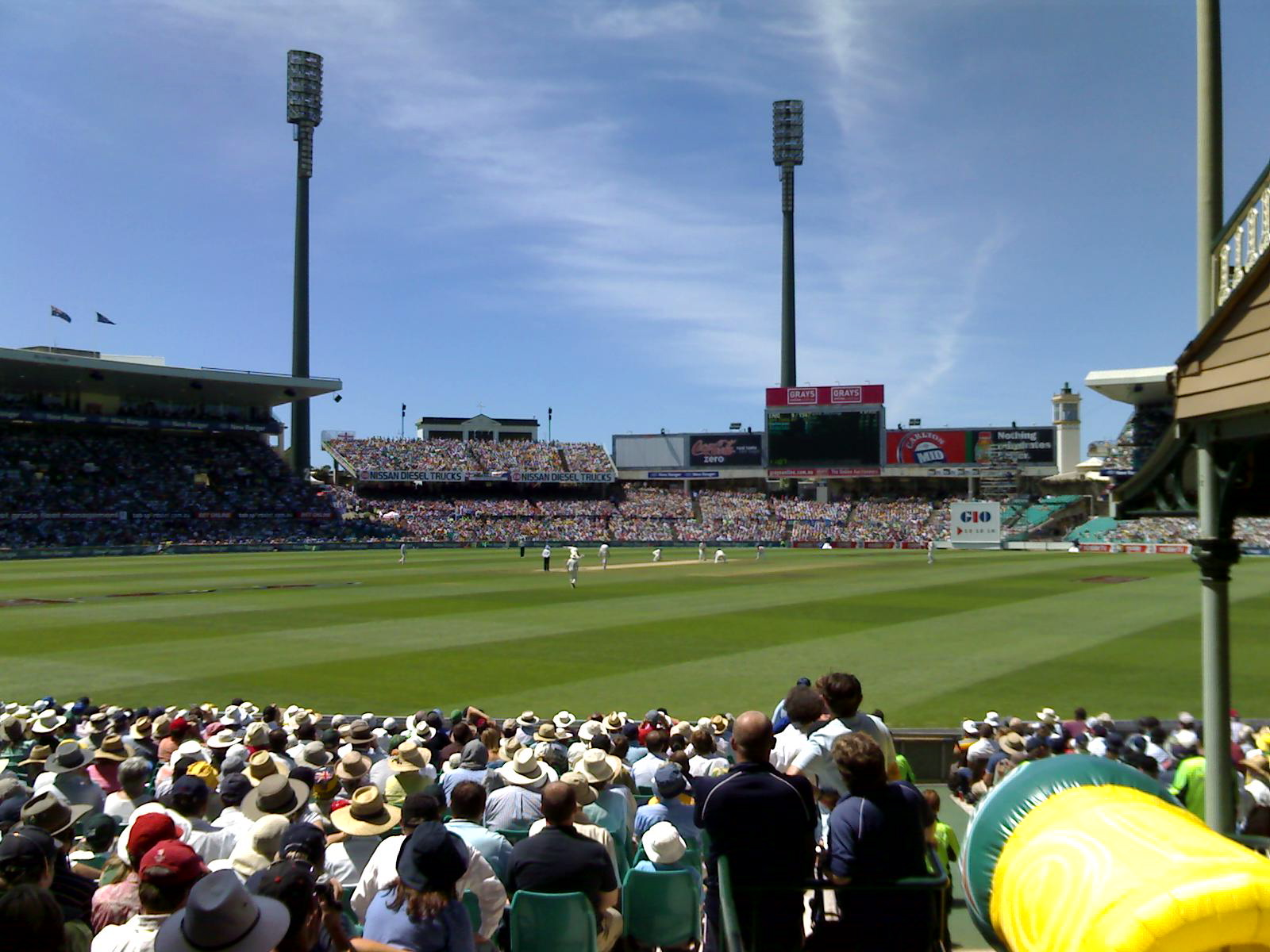
Shane Warne is pictured bowling one of his last balls in Test cricket

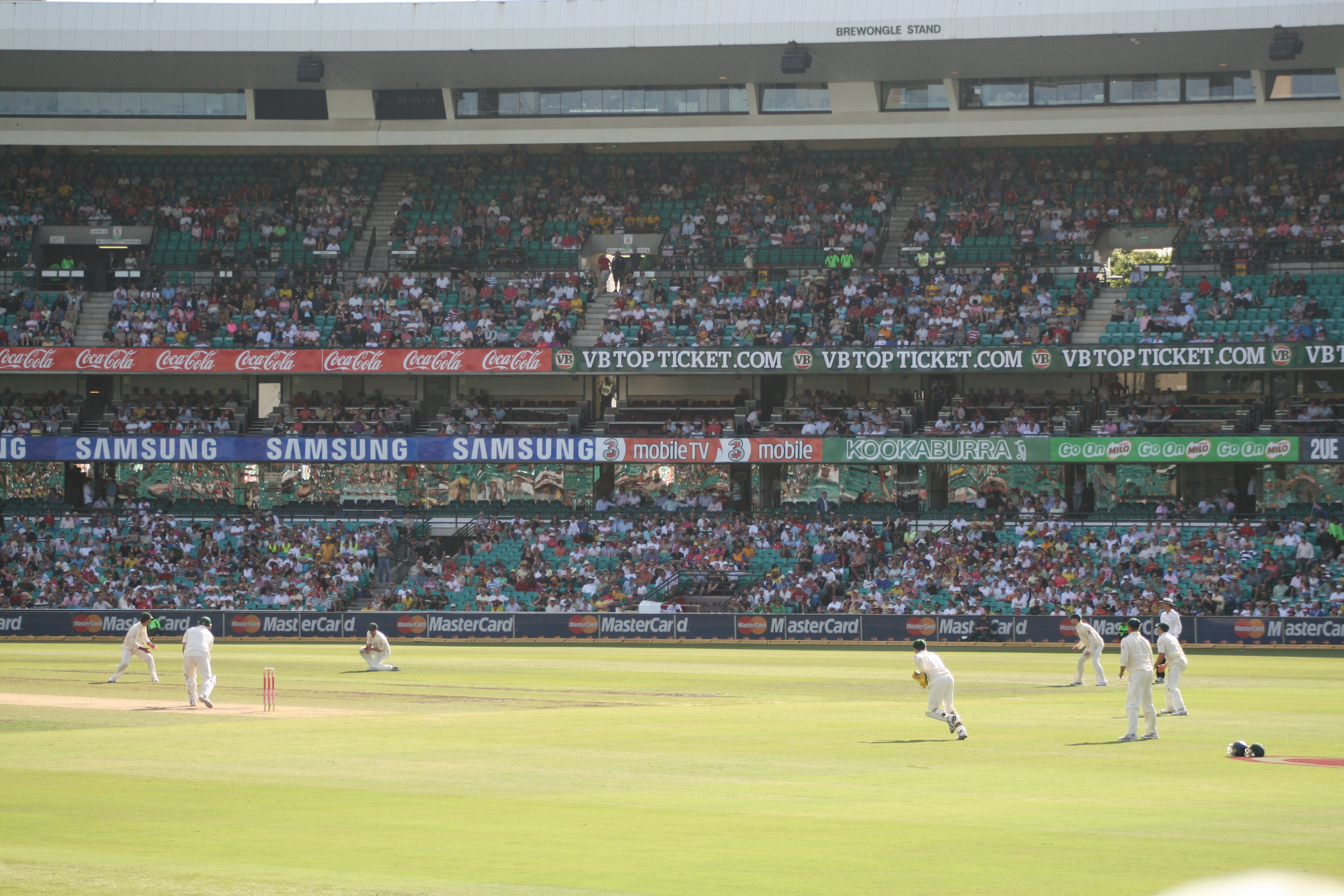
South Africa playing against Australia in 2009

In the last test of the 1970–71 English tour, England fast bowler John Snow struck Australian spinner and tailender Terry Jenner on the head with a bouncer. The Sydney crowd let Snow and the English know they were not happy with his behaviour and when Snow took up his fielding position on the fence a spectator spoke to him and grabbed him by the shirt. Cans were thrown onto the field and England captain Ray Illingworth took his team from the ground.

The first women's club cricket match was held at the SCG in 1886 when the Fernleas played the Siroccos. Although cricket was not seen as an appropriate game for women, women's cricket associations were formed in Victoria in 1905 and other states in the 1920s, and 1930s.

Night cricket was first played at the SCG on 28 November 1978 with World Series Cricket. A crowd of 50,000 packed the ground.

The SCG was the scene of Shane Warne's first (1992) and final Tests (2007). In 2007, Justin Langer and Glenn McGrath also played their final Tests.

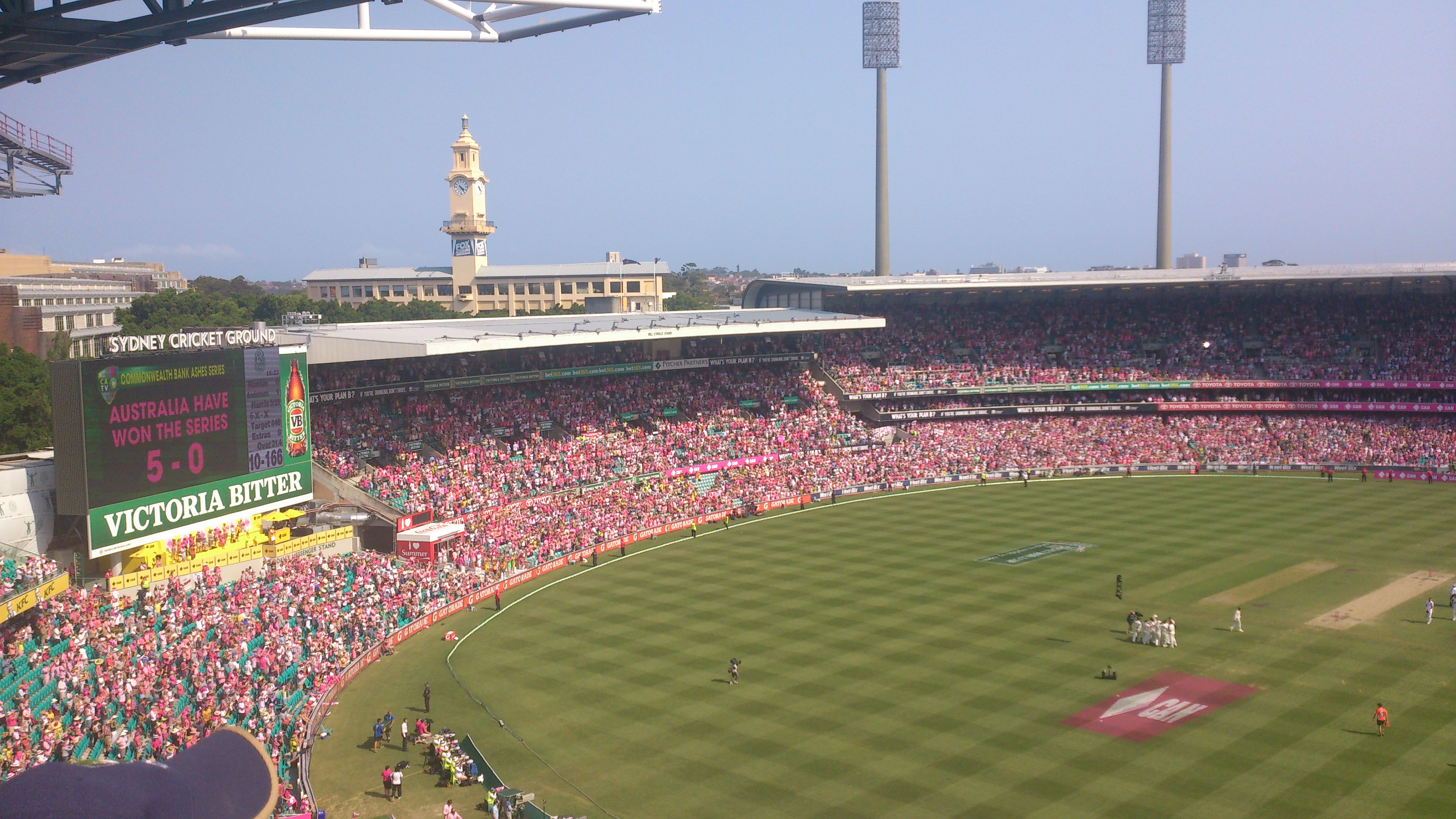
Celebrations at the SCG after Australia won the Ashes 5–0 in 2014

During the 100th Test match held at SCG, on 3 January 2012, Michael Clarke scored his maiden triple century against India and was the first player to do so at the ground. Exactly nine years before, Steve Waugh scored a century to retain The Ashes, and it was also the scene of his final test against India in 2004.

The SCG was venue of two 5-0 Ashes Series clean sweeps (completed in early 2007 and 2014).

SCG is the traditional ground for hosting New Year Tests, as well as the traditional final match of the Australian Ashes Series. Since 2008, the New Year Test has also been named the Pink Test, organised by Glenn McGrath and the McGrath Foundation, named for his late wife Jane McGrath to raise breast cancer awareness, and on the third day, even if the day's play is rained out, is named Pink Day or Jane McGrath Day in her honour.

The SCG was the scene of tragedy on 25 November 2014, when a bouncer from Sean Abbott struck Phillip Hughes's neck, knocking him unconscious. Hughes later died as a result of a subarachnoid haemorrhage on 27 November, having never regained consciousness.

Since 2015, it is the venue where David Warner scored three consecutive centuries in Tests (2015–17). Steve Smith and Don Bradman scored four in a row at the Melbourne Cricket Ground. During the streak, he scored a century within the first session of the game in 2017 against Pakistan. He also scored a half century in the second innings. The half century streak continued to three when he scored a half century in the first innings of the final test in the 2017-18 Ashes series, but the century streak ended as Australia won by an innings, and was not required to bat again.

On 12 January 2019, Australia won the first ODI against India at the Sydney Cricket Ground by 34 runs, to record their 1,000th win in international cricket.

== Rugby league ==
The SCG has hosted 1,392 top-level premiership rugby league games – more than any other ground in Australia (as of 2015), in addition to 70 Test matches and World Cup games. Between 1913 and 1987, the NSWRFL Premiership Final was always played at the SCG, unless circumstances dictated otherwise. Due to the ground's historical significance to rugby league, it is often used for special heritage matches for National Rugby League club and representative matches.

Rugby league was first played at the SCG on 22 June 1911 between Australia and New Zealand. The ground was first used by the New South Wales Rugby Football League in 1913. At this time the Trust only gave players access to dressing sheds in the Sheridan Stand and did not allow use of the rooms in the Members' Stand. This rule was relaxed in 1918. The 1915 NSWRFL season's first round match between defending premiers South Sydney and Glebe was played in front of a record crowd of 13,000.

The 1920 Great Britain Lions tour saw the British rugby league team tour Australia for the first time since World War I and huge crowds attended their games. The first match of the tour was at the SCG against Metropolis in front of nearly 68,000 spectators. Australia won the first Test in Brisbane and in the second Test at the SCG on 3 July. The Australians sealed the series, scoring five tries to win 21–8 and secure the Ashes series for the first time at home.

The attendance record for a rugby league match in Australia was broken in 1932, when 70,204 people saw Australia play England in the first Test of the 1932 Ashes series at the SCG. This crowd number meant rugby league and the SCG held the record for the highest attendance yet seen at a football match in any code, as well as a single day of cricket. It was also in this game that the Australians wore at home for the first time the 1929 introduced green jersey with a double gold 'V', which they have been wearing ever since. The English side boasted one of the great rugby league back lines consisting of captain Jim Sullivan (fullback), Alf Ellaby and Stan Smith (wings), and Artie Atkinson and Stan Brogden in the centres. The gates of the SCG had to be closed to prevent another 15,000 people from entering. Australia lost the game 8–6. The second game was the famous "Battle of Brisbane" Test, which Australia won. In the third Test back at the SCG Australia lead 11–3 until late in the game. Incredibly, England scored three quick tries to snatch the game (18–13) and the series. The attendance of the first test stood as the highest recorded crowd for an international rugby league match until 73,631 fans attended the 1992 World Cup final between Australia and Great Britain at the famous Wembley Stadium in London, England.

Unrecognizable after playing on a muddy SCG, footballers of the British and Australian national rugby league sides leave the field after the first Test on 12 June 1950.

The next tour by England was in 1946, knows as The "Indomitables" tour due to the Great Britain team traveling to Australia on the Royal Navy's Aircraft carrier HMS Indomitable. The first test played on 17 June was an 8 – 8 draw, the opening try of the series was scored by the legendary Frank Whitcombe for the tourists, in front of a crowd of 64,527. England went on to win The Ashes. In 1950 Australia had not won a series against the team Lions for 30 years but this time there was a big change. Britain had won the first Test and Australia the second, which made the third SCG Test the decider. The tour coincided with a record amount of rain and by the time the teams arrived the SCG was a mud heap. Forty tonnes of soil were brought in and spread over the surface to try and dry it out. Tied 2–2 at half time, Australia scored the only try of the match late in the second half when winger Ron Roberts crossed in the corner to seal the win. At the end of the game the crowd of over 47,000 jumped the fence and invaded the field and congregated in front of the Members' Stand cheering and calling for Aussie captain Clive Churchill.

The 1963 NSWRFL Grand Final was won by the St George Dragons 8–3 in front of 69,860 fans in atrocious conditions. It was the Dragons eighth consecutive premiership and their third consecutive grand final win against the Western Suburbs Magpies. The match's only try, scored by Dragons winger Johnny King, was clouded in controversy after he appeared to be tackled when a defender knocked him flat on the ground, only to get up and carry the ball to the try line under howls of protest from Wests players who believe that the referee had called King to play the ball. That try became the centre of furore when rumours spread that match referee Darcy Lawler had bet on St. George to win (Wests captain Arthur Summons later claimed one of his players announced to his teammates before the game that any who had bet on the Magpies to win had better lay off their bets as referee Lawler had backed St. George). After the match, photographer John O'Gready took the iconic rugby league photograph, "The Gladiators", depicting Arthur Summons supporting St. George captain Norm Provan. The photo of Summons and Provan was later used as the basis for the Winfield Cup trophy, and continues to be used to this day with the National Rugby League's Telstra Premiership Trophy.

On 18 September 1965, the largest ever official crowd at the SCG, 78,056, saw St George defeat the South Sydney Rabbitohs 12–8 in the NSWRFL grand final. Gates were ordered to be closed two hours before the game began and children were allowed to sit inside the fence. Contemporary accounts indicate that many more – perhaps thousands – gained other means of access and sat on grandstand roofs or went into the Sydney Showground (Moore Park) and viewed the match from the stairways and roof of the main pavilion. Estimates from people there that day put the crowd as high as 90,000. This would stand as the largest rugby league crowd in Australia until Game 2 of the 1994 State of Origin series when 87,161 attended the game at the Melbourne Cricket Ground. Due to the overcrowding of the ground during the grand final, the New South Wales Police Force imposed a 70,000 capacity limit on the Cricket Ground for safety reasons.

The SCG hosted the 1968 Rugby League World Cup final, won 20–2 by the Johnny Raper led Australians over France in front of 54,290. The Australian team that day, coached by Harry Bath, boasted legends of the Australian game in Raper (Lock), Eric Simms (Fullback), Graeme Langlands and Johnny Greaves (centres), Bob Fulton (Five-eighth), Billy Smith (halfback), Arthur Beetson (prop) and Dick Thornett and Ron Coote (second-row). Although the Final attracted over 54,000 fans, this was actually not the highest attendance of the 1968 World Cup. That came during the opening game of the tournament when 62,256 saw Australia defeat Great Britain 25–10. This would stand as the highest attendance for a World Cup match until 73,631 attended the 1992 World Cup final to see Australia again defeat Great Britain 10–6 at the famous Wembley Stadium in London.

One of the most courageous efforts at the SCG was John Sattler's performance in the 1970 grand final between South Sydney and the Manly-Warringah Sea Eagles. In the first ten minutes of the game, South's captain Sattler had his jaw broken by a punch from Manly forward John Bucknall in an off-the-ball incident. Sattler went down but pulled himself up on teammate Michael Cleary, asking the winger to help him so that the other players would not know he was hurt. In an act of supreme courage Sattler played on, refusing treatment at half time and pleas from teammates not to take the field again, to lead Souths to a famous 23–12 win. It was not until well after the game that he went to hospital. The Australian side to tour Britain was selected that night and, but for his injury, Sattler would have been picked as captain.

The Cricket Ground hosted what many consider to be the toughest grand final of all in 1973 when defending premiers Manly-Warringah faced the Cronulla-Sutherland Sharks, who were playing in their first ever grand final after joining the competition in 1967. The Sharks were Captain-coached by Great Britain halfback Tommy Bishop and had a forward pack led by his tough St. Helens and GB teammate Cliff Watson and 1973 Rothmans Medallist Ken Maddison, along with goal kicking 18-year-old whiz-kid centre Steve Rogers. Manly were coached by Ron Willey and captained by tough hooker Freddy Jones, and could boast internationals Ken Irvine, Ray Branighan, Bob Fulton, John O'Neill, British lock Malcolm Reilly, as well as tough tackling second-row forward Terry Randall and 19-year-old fullback Graham Eadie. From the opening kick off the game descended into a series of high or late tackles and several all-in brawls, though surprisingly referee Keith Page did not send any player off, despite threatening to do so and repeatedly handing out cautions, including twice to all 26 players on the field. In the opening minutes of the game, Mal Reilly was felled in back play by Cronulla hooker Ron "Rocky" Turner well after he kicked the ball and, after writhing on the ground in agony with a badly bruised hip, left the field for a pain killing injection. When he returned he created mayhem with strong-arm tactics, although he was clearly out of sorts football wise and was replaced after just 25 minutes by John Bucknell. In the end, the difference between the two teams was Manly's international centre Bob Fulton who scored two tries in leading Manly to a 10–7 win. The game was described by Sunday Telegraph writer Ian Heads as "A grand final as tough and dirty as any bar-room brawl".

In 1975, in one of the most memorable grand finals ever, the Arthur Beetson captained, Jack Gibson coached Eastern Suburbs Roosters, defeated St. George 38–0 to win the premiership. That Roosters team is considered one of the best sides ever assembled and the eight tries to nil scoreline remained a record winning margin in a grand final until the 2008 NRL Grand Final played between Manly Warringah and the Melbourne Storm, Manly winning by the tune of 40–0. However, the game was famous for reasons other than the scoreline. St George's Captain-coach Graeme Langlands played with a misdirected pain killing injection that made his right leg go numb and prevented him from playing anywhere near his best. Easts were without two of their stars, rookie fullback Russell Fairfax and centre Mark Harris, and coach Jack Gibson gambled on an unknown player to help fill the void – John Rheinberger – who played in his first only first grade game in the grand final. Leading by only 5–0 at half-time, the Roosters scored an avalanche of tries after the interval to humiliate the Dragons. Earlier in the same season, the Roosters recorded the longest winning streak of any first grade rugby league football club – 19 matches. It was the Eastern Suburbs Roosters' eleventh premiership victory and their second in succession.

The SCG hosted its second Rugby League World Cup final in 1977. On 25 June Australia defeated Great Britain 13–12 in front of just 24,457 fans. The match was highlighted by a 60-metre try to Manly-Warringah centre Russel Gartner who outpaced the Lions chasers late in the first half to give Australia an 8–5 lead. This would prove to be (as of 2016) the last World Cup game played at the SCG.

In 1981, another memorable and emotional rugby league grand final was played at the SCG. Since joining the Sydney Premiership in 1947, the Parramatta Eels had not won a grand final. In 1976 and 1977 it had suffered consecutive losses, first to Manly-Warringah (who also joined the league in 1947) and then St George in the first replayed grand final. In 1981, the Eels 'dream team' (another team coached by Jack Gibson), comprising internationals Ray Price, Mick Cronin, Ron Hilditch and Bob "The Bear" O'Reilly, as well as budding stars Peter Sterling, Brett Kenny, Steve Ella, Eric Grothe and John Muggleton, outscored the Tommy Raudonikis captained Newtown four tries to three to win 20–11 and secure their first premiership. Playing second-row for Newtown that day was future dual grand final winning, and NSW State of Origin coach Phil Gould. Financial pressures at the Newtown club would result in the Jets competing in the New South Wales Rugby League first grade competition for only two seasons following their 1981 grand final appearance.

The 1986 NSWRL Grand Final at the SCG between the John Monie coached Parramatta and defending premiers Canterbury-Bankstown, coached by Warren Ryan, and played in front of one of the smallest grand final crowds in years (45,843), would go down as the lowest scoring and only try-less grand final in NSWRL history. Parramatta won their 4th premiership in six years with a tough 4–2 win thanks to two Mick Cronin goals to send captain Ray Price, and Cronin, into rugby league retirement on the winning note they deserved after stellar careers for Parramatta, NSW and Australia. Cronin retired from the game having scored 1,971 points in the Sydney premiership (75 tries, 865 goals and 2 field goals, all for Parramatta), at the time the record number of points scored in a career.

The last rugby league grand final played at the Cricket Ground was the 1987 decider between the Bob Fulton coached Manly-Warringah Sea Eagles and the Canberra Raiders, who had joined the premiership in 1982. In front of 50,201 fans on an unseasonably warm day in Sydney, the Sea Eagles ran out 18–8 winners, scoring two tries to one with dual rugby international Michael O'Connor scoring 14 of Manly's points with a try and a perfect 5/5 goal kicking. Manly's other try scorer that day, Five-eighth Cliff Lyons won the Clive Churchill Medal as the man of the match.

The ground lost the grand final and numerous games to the Sydney Football Stadium (SFS) in 1988. Even so, between 1988 and 2018 the ground continued to host occasional National Rugby League matches, mostly featuring the Heritage round game between St George Illawarra and South Sydney and the 2008 Centenary ANZAC Test between Australia and New Zealand, in what was the first test held at the famous old ground since the Wally Lewis captained Australians had defeated the Kiwis 29–12 on 19 July 1986 in front of 34,302 fans. The 2008 Kangaroos, kitted out in replica 1908 jumpers depicting the colours of NSW and Qld, ran out 28–12 winners in front of 34,571 fans, the largest Test crowd in Sydney since the first Ashes test of the 1992 Great Britain Lions tour when 40,141 attended Game 1 at the SFS.

Regular rugby league action returned to the SCG on 16 March 2019 with the Sydney Roosters calling the SCG home after the Sydney Football Stadium was demolished to make way for the new Sydney Football Stadium on the site. The Anzac Day clash between St George Illawarra and the Sydney Roosters will also be held at the SCG while the Roosters call the cricket ground home. The Roosters also played two home games at the SCG against the Melbourne Storm and Manly Warringah in 2023 due to the Sydney Football Stadium being used for the 2023 FIFA Women's World Cup.

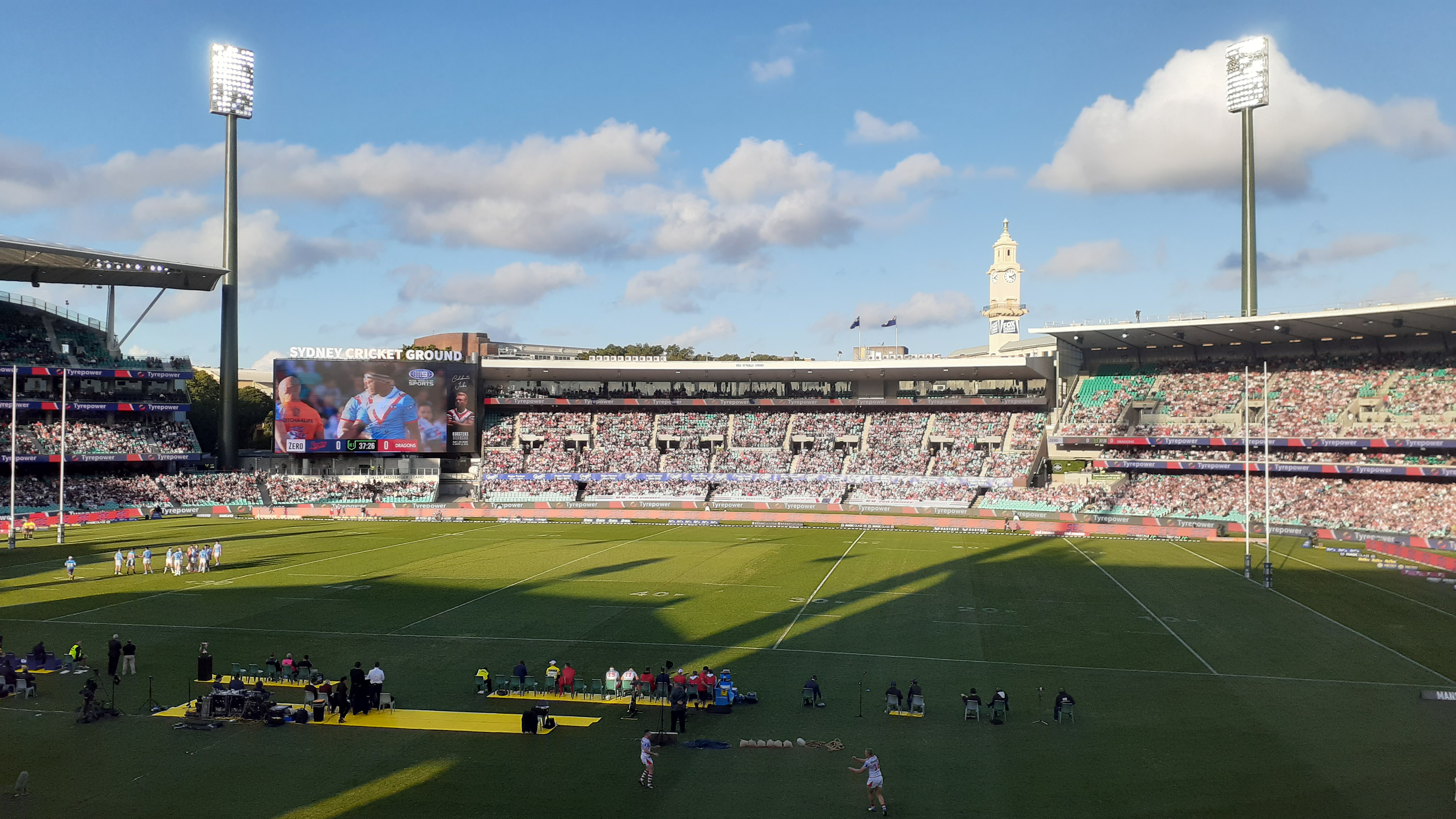
The Bill O'Reilly and Dally Messenger Stands during the Sydney Roosters vs St George Illawarra ANZAC Day clash in 2021

=== State of Origin ===
The Cricket Ground hosted six State of Origin series games from 1982 to 1987

Game#	Date	Result	Attendance	Year
1	22 June 1982	Queensland def. New South Wales 10–5	20,242	1982
2	21 June 1983	New South Wales def. Queensland 10–6	21,620	1983
3	19 June 1984	Queensland def. New South Wales 14–2	29,088	1984
4	11 June 1985	New South Wales def. Queensland 21–14	39,068	1985
5	10 June 1986	New South Wales def. Queensland 24–20	40,707	1986
6	16 June 1987	Queensland def. New South Wales 12–6	42,048	1987

== Tennis ==
In 1885 the first inter-colonial tennis match was held at the SCG when Victoria played New South Wales although forms of the game were no doubt played in Australia from its colonial beginnings. All colonies of Australia were well established when the final versions of the rules of the game were codified by the Marylebone Cricket Club in 1875 and by the All England Lawn Tennis and Croquet Club in 1877 when it held its first tournament at Wimbledon.

Tennis was regularly played at the SCG in the early days. The Sydney tournament which was to become the New South Wales Open, was first played at the SCG in 1885 before moving to the NSW Lawn Tennis Club's courts at Double Bay, then to White City and later to the Olympic Tennis Centre at Homebush Bay. The SCG was the host of the 1908 Australasian Championships.

== Motor racing ==
In 1898, Sydney cycle firm, Gavin Gibson Ltd, imported seven motorised tricycles produced by Count Jules-Albert de Dion and powered by one cylinder petrol engines designed by his partner Georges Bouton. On the evening of 1 January 1901, these seven machines raced around the concrete cycle track which ringed the inside of the SCG in those days to compete in Australia's first ever motor race.

== Empire Games ==
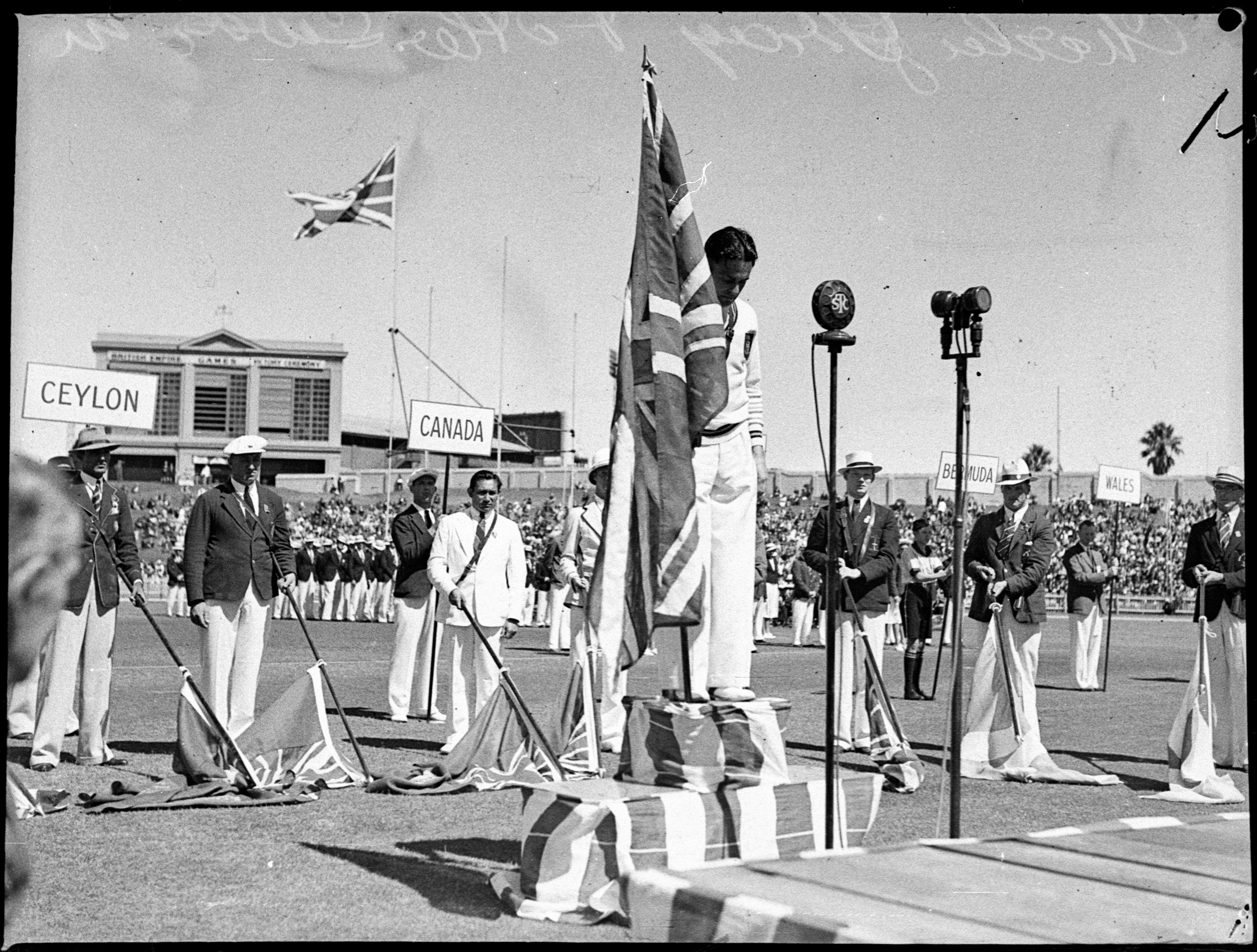
Opening of the Empire Games, Sydney Cricket Ground, 1938

The SCG was the main stadium for the 1938 British Empire Games which were tied into the State's sesqui-centenary celebrations. Perhaps because of this the Federal Government provided no money and only £10,000 came from the State Government to cover the organising committee's administrative costs. The budget was therefore, very tight and using the existing SCG was one way of making ends meet. Cyclist Edgar "Dunc" Gray led the teams onto the ground and athletes ran on a makeshift grass track.

== Rugby union ==
The colony's first rugby union game was played at the ground in June 1870 between the Wallaroo FC and a team of British 'Army & Navy' men. This was the first football game of any code played at the venue. In what became regular annual fixtures at the SCG, in 1882 the first inter-colonial game was played there when NSW (now Waratahs) beat Queensland (now Reds) 28–4. Sydney club rugby union matches were in the 1890s regularly played at the SCG, including for The Association Ground (SCG) Cup. In 1907 a match between NSW (featuring Dally Messenger) and the New Zealand 'All Blacks' drew a record 52,000 crowd, setting a new benchmark for the highest attendance in Australia at any football code or cricket to that time. In 1899 at the SCG the Australian national team (now Wallabies) made its international debut, wearing sky blue jerseys against the British Lions.

Rugby union continued to play Test matches at the SCG until it lost its lease of the ground to rugby league at the start of the 1913 season. At the end of 1928 access was again able to be obtained, particularly for representative matches. Over the years the SCG hosted 71 rugby union tests before Sydney international matches were moved first to Waratah Rugby Park (Concord Oval), then the Sydney Football Stadium and later Stadium Australia. The largest ever crowd to watch a rugby union match at the SCG was 49,327 who saw NSW played New Zealand on 13 July 1907.

Of those 71 tests none could have been more dramatic than the game against the South African Springboks on 7 August 1971. Marred by anti-apartheid protests, field invasions and objects being thrown onto the ground and halted several times to remove golf balls and protestors, it was won by South Africa who went through the tour undefeated.

The SCG has been both a happy and unhappy hunting ground for Australian rugby union. One of the worst incidents to occur there was the sad demise of Ken Catchpole's international career. Robbed of a retirement, his career ended in a disgraceful scandal. Australia was playing the New Zealand All Blacks and while Catchpole was trapped on the bottom of a ruck New Zealander second rower, Colin Meads, tried to drag him out by one leg, splitting him like a wishbone. Australia, although well beaten on this occasion, was also served by international-standard halfbacks and 20-year-old John Hipwell ran on for his first test as Catchpole was carried off.

Dramatic though that game was, no test could have been as important in the development of Australian Rugby Union than the game against the touring Welsh team in 1978.

The 1978 Welsh had arrived in Australia as (the then) Five Nations Champions, Triple Crown winners, one of the best rugby union teams in the world at the time, though they were not in good shape by the time they got to Sydney for the last game of the tour; the second test. The team was suffering from many injuries and in two earlier tour games had suffered a last minute loss to Sydney and a humiliating defeat midweek to the Australian Capital Territory.

Rumours abounded that the Welsh were ready for a big 'get square' with Australian prop Steve Finnane, the so-called 'enforcer' of the Australian team. Finnane and other senior members of the team had vowed to avenge the defeat of the Australians by the Welsh on their last tour of the UK several years before. The SCG crowd did not have long to wait because after the very first scrum Welsh prop Graham Price came out holding his bloodied jaw, the victim of a Finnane punch. Price had bored in on Finnane, his opposite number in the front row and Finnane reacted.

After Price left the field and the game continued for a short while until the Welsh, using a pre-determined code word, sparked an all-in-brawl. Wales lost the test and the two-test series.

In 1979 there was a one-off game against the All Blacks at the SCG. The kicking of a young five-eighth named Tony Melrose closed out the New Zealanders and Australia won a try-less game 12–6, to take back the Bledisloe Cup for the first time since 1949. The following year the Australians showed it was no fluke by beating New Zealand two tests to one in Australia to successfully defend the trophy for the first time.

On 14 April 2018 the NSW Waratahs played a home game at the SCG against the Queensland Reds in the Waratahs first appearance at the ground in 35 years.

The Waratahs staged three of their home games in the 2019 Super Rugby season at the SCG while the Sydney Football Stadium was being rebuilt. In July 2022 the SCG staged a rugby union test for the first time since 1986 when Australia played England.

== Australian rules football ==
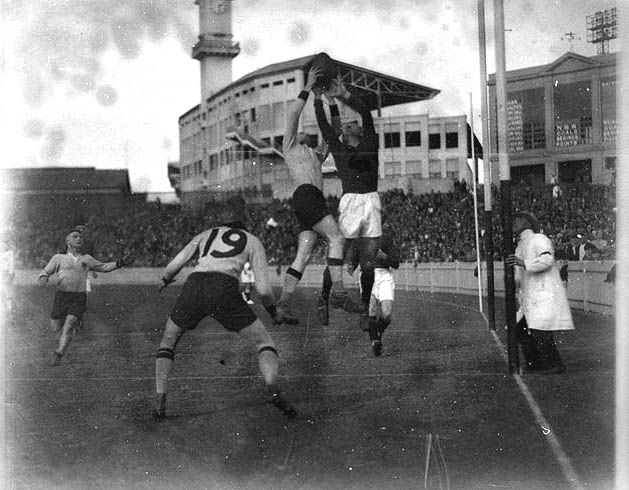
A New South Wales player marks over a West Australian opponent in the goal square at the 1933 Australian Football Carnival. The old Sydney Showground is in the background

The first Australian rules football match to be played at the SCG was Inter-Colonial football match played between Victoria and New South Wales on 6 August 1881.

Essendon and Melbourne played a premiership match at Moore Park in 1904 in front of the Governor General and Governor of NSW. Melbourne won and both teams had to return home by boat down the coast; two other matches (Fitzroy v Collingwood and Geelong v Carlton, which had been postponed) were also played there in 1903. In 1922, Port Adelaide played a combined New South Wales side on the ground.

In the subsequent decades, the ground was rarely used for Australian Rules, except for the occasional exhibition match or interstate football carnival.

Richmond played Collingwood there in 1952, and eight VFL matches were played there in 1979–1981, but Australian rules football was not to make a regular comeback to the SCG until 1982, when South Melbourne relocated to Sydney and made the SCG its home ground.

=== Sydney Swans ===
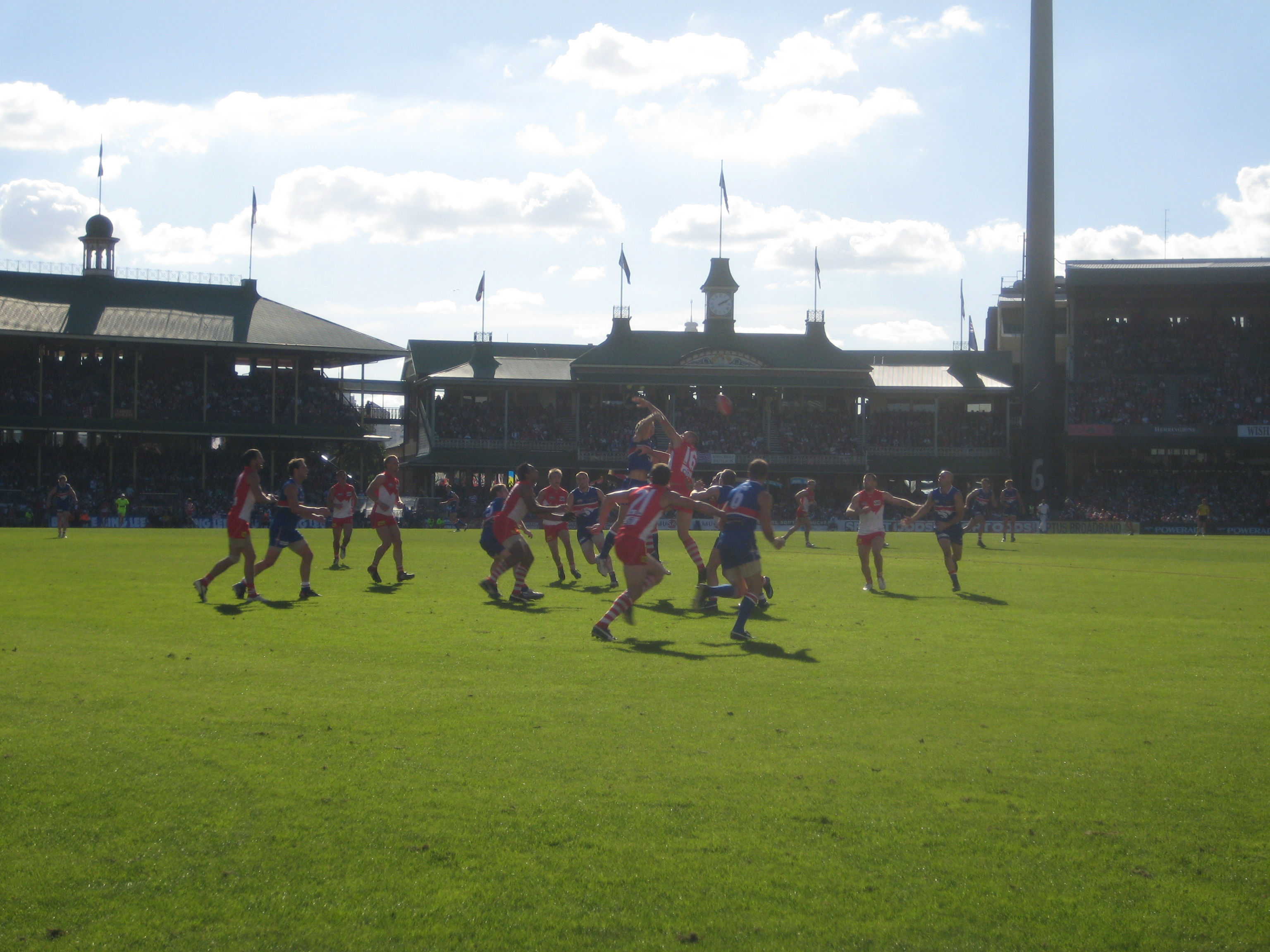
Sydney Swans playing the Western Bulldogs at the SCG in 2008

South Melbourne was formed in 1867, a foundation member of the first Australian rules competition the Victorian Football Association (VFA) and also its later replacement the Victorian Football League (VFL). The club won five premierships with the VFA up to 1890 and three more in the VFL in the first half of the 20th century, but a lack of success in the post-war years and serious financial troubles left them ripe for relocation when the game's administrators were looking to expand the competition into other states.

In 1982 South Melbourne moved to Sydney and the SCG to become the Sydney Swans. Despite their shaky financial situation, the Swans were the flavour of Sydney in the early years; the Swans matches at the SCG were the place to be seen, rivaling Sydney's main winter sport, rugby league. In the late 1980s Sydney Rules Ltd, the company which ran the licence for the club, recorded a profit of $600,000. However, when the stock market crashed in October 1987, the Swans went with it, but the Swans have since managed to hold on and have gained a foothold in Sydney.

View towards the members' stands as seen during the 2018 second elimination final between the Swans and the Giants

The SCG most notably hosted Sydney's preliminary final against Essendon in 1996, in which full forward Tony Lockett scored a behind after the final siren to give Sydney a one-point win, sending the Swans into their first grand final since 1945. Between 2003 and 2015, most Sydney Swans home finals had been played at the larger Stadium Australia unless it was otherwise booked. Since 2016, all Swans home finals (with the exception of a Sydney Derby in 2016) have been played at the SCG.

There have been two modern-day pitch invasions witnessed at the ground: first in 1999, when Tony Lockett kicked his 1300th career goal to become the highest goalkicker in VFL/AFL history, and second in 2022 when Lance Franklin kicked his 1000th career goal becoming only the sixth player to kick as many goals in VFL/AFL history.

On 9 September 2017, the largest ever crowd to watch an Australian Rules game at the SCG, 46,323, came to see the Swans defeat Essendon in an Elimination Final.

The SCG was the shortest field used for AFL games, at 153 metres long, but Geelong's Kardinia Park is narrower. However recent works on the Northern Stand facilitated an extension of the playing surface means it is no longer the shortest ground in the league.

== Other sports ==
The SCG has been a popular arena for a whole range of sports before the turn of the 20th century including cricket, tennis, baseball, soccer and cycling with athletics being staged there as early as 1879. On New Year's Day, 1880, possibly some of the most exotic sports ever seen at the SCG were staged when the 12th Annual Highlands Games was held. Organised by the Scottish community events included tossing the caber, putting the stone and other traditional Highland sports as well as Highland dancing. A crowd of 5000 attended. On 5 May 1964, 51,566 soccer fans came to the SCG to see NSW take on English club Everton F.C. In 1974 the Socceroos defeated Uruguay 2–0 in front of a capacity crowd in a friendly match before the World Cup finals. It was announced in April 2018 that Sydney FC will stage 6 of their 13 home matches in the 2019-2020 A-League season with the other 7 games to be split between Jubilee Oval and Leichhardt Oval while the Sydney Football Stadium is demolished and rebuilt. Sydney FC played their first game at the SCG on 27 October 2018 against rivals Western Sydney Wanderers FC in front of 30,688 fans.

=== Baseball ===
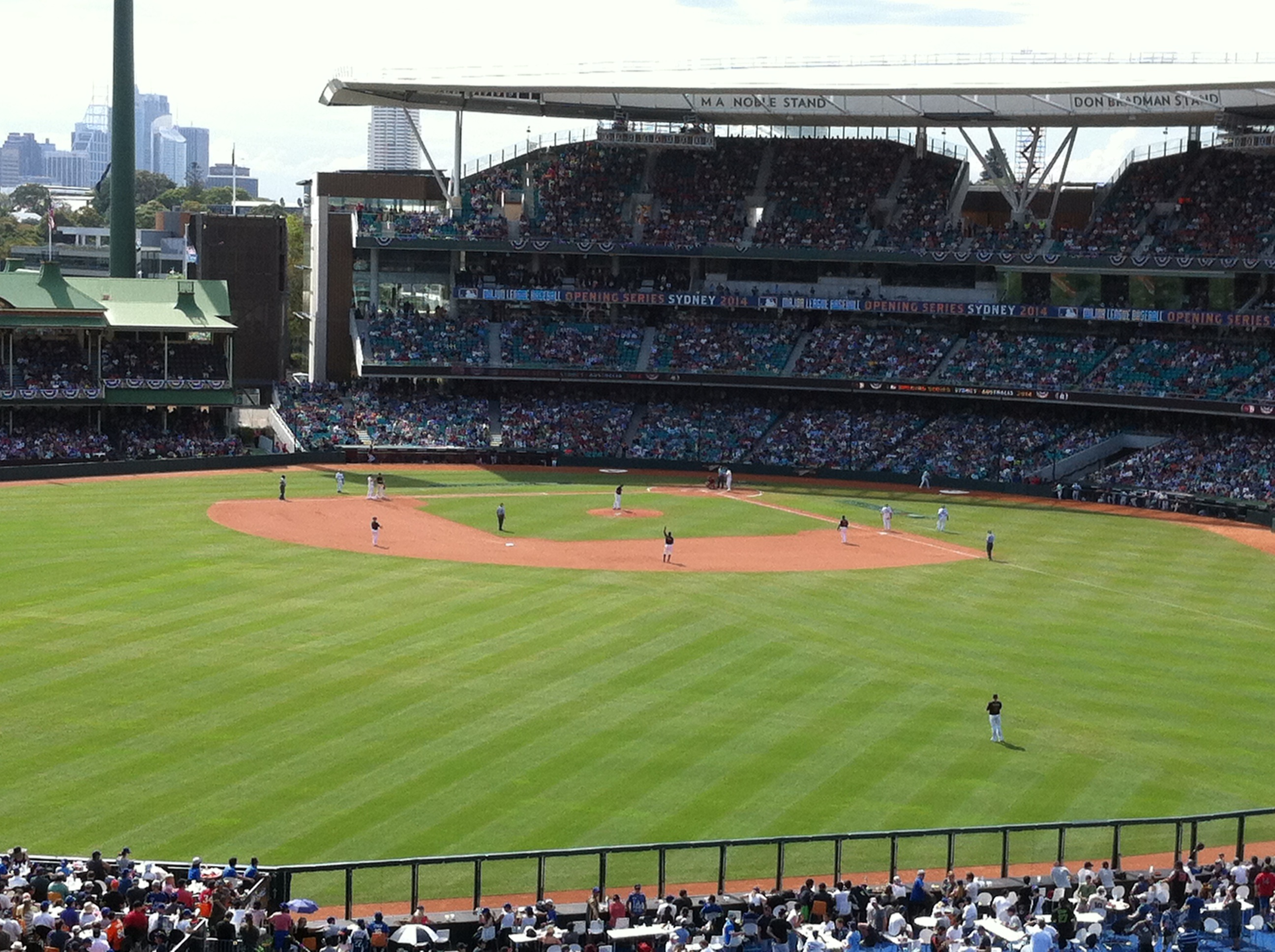
Major League Baseball starts its 2014 season at the Sydney Cricket Ground

In June 2013, Major League Baseball, the New South Wales Government, and the Sydney Cricket Ground announced that the season opening first two games of the 2014 MLB season would be played at the SCG between the Arizona Diamondbacks and the Los Angeles Dodgers, on Saturday 22 March (7pm AEST / 0800 UTC / 1am PDT) and Sunday 23 March (1pm AEST / 0200 UTC / 7pm PDT Saturday 22 March) 2014. These were the first MLB regular season games ever played in Australia, and the Dodgers swept the series.

The Northern Stand was completed for the 2013–14 Ashes series, and provided the main stand behind home plate, with premium seating. The temporary outfield fence arced from the eastern Bill O'Reilly Stand (left field / third base line) and the western Brewongle Stand (right field / first base line). Two bullpens were positioned behind the outfield fence. Seating was restricted in the Victor Trumper Stand and the Clive Churchill Stand due to eye-line restrictions caused by the outfield fence and the need for a batter's eye space in centre field. Its dimensions were 328 feet (99.974 m) to foul lines, 370 feet (112.776 m) to power alleys, and 400 feet (121.920 m) to centre field.

It was announced that due to the restricted seating the SCG's capacity would be 38,000 for baseball. Game 1 of the series, won 3–1 by the Dodgers with the win going to their ace pitcher Clayton Kershaw, attracted 38,266 fans while Game 2, won 7–5 by the Dodgers, attracted 38,079 fans. As the games took place approximately one week before the normal season opening date, both the Diamondbacks and the Dodgers actually returned to their Spring Training schedules once the series ended.

Major League Baseball is a significant co-owner of the Australian Baseball League relaunched in 2010, and cooperates with the Australian Baseball Federation.

== Test cricket records ==
=== Batting ===
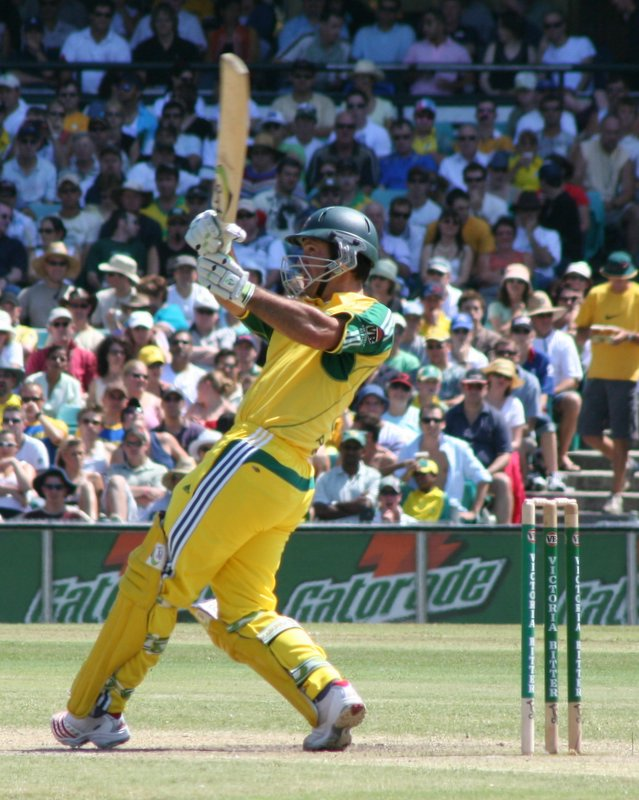
Ricky Ponting holds the record for most career runs at the SCG

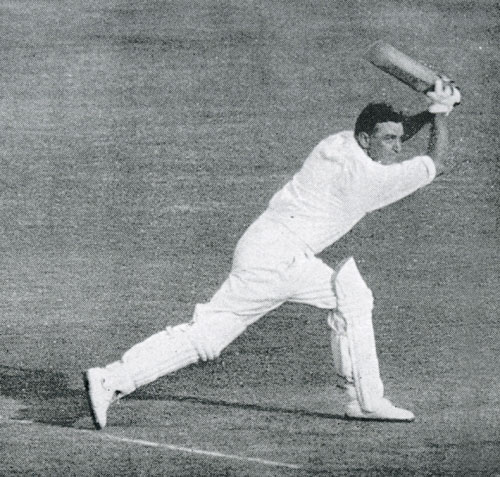
Wally Hammond scored 808 runs in 7 innings at the ground; a record for non-Australians

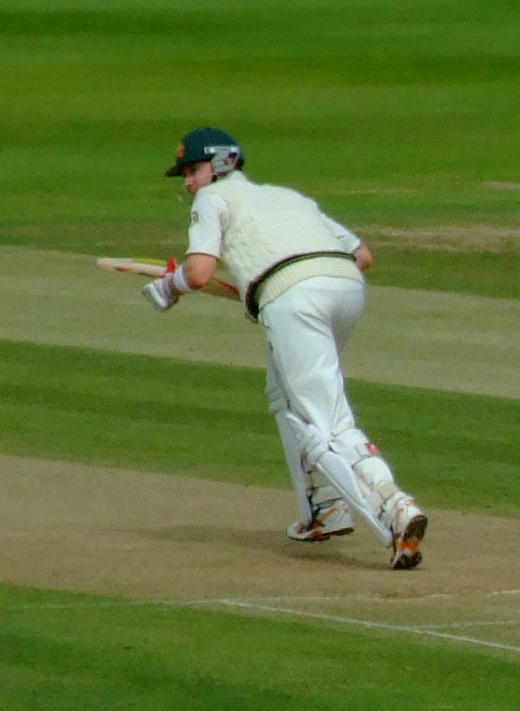
Michael Clarke scored 329* against India in 2012, the highest score at the ground

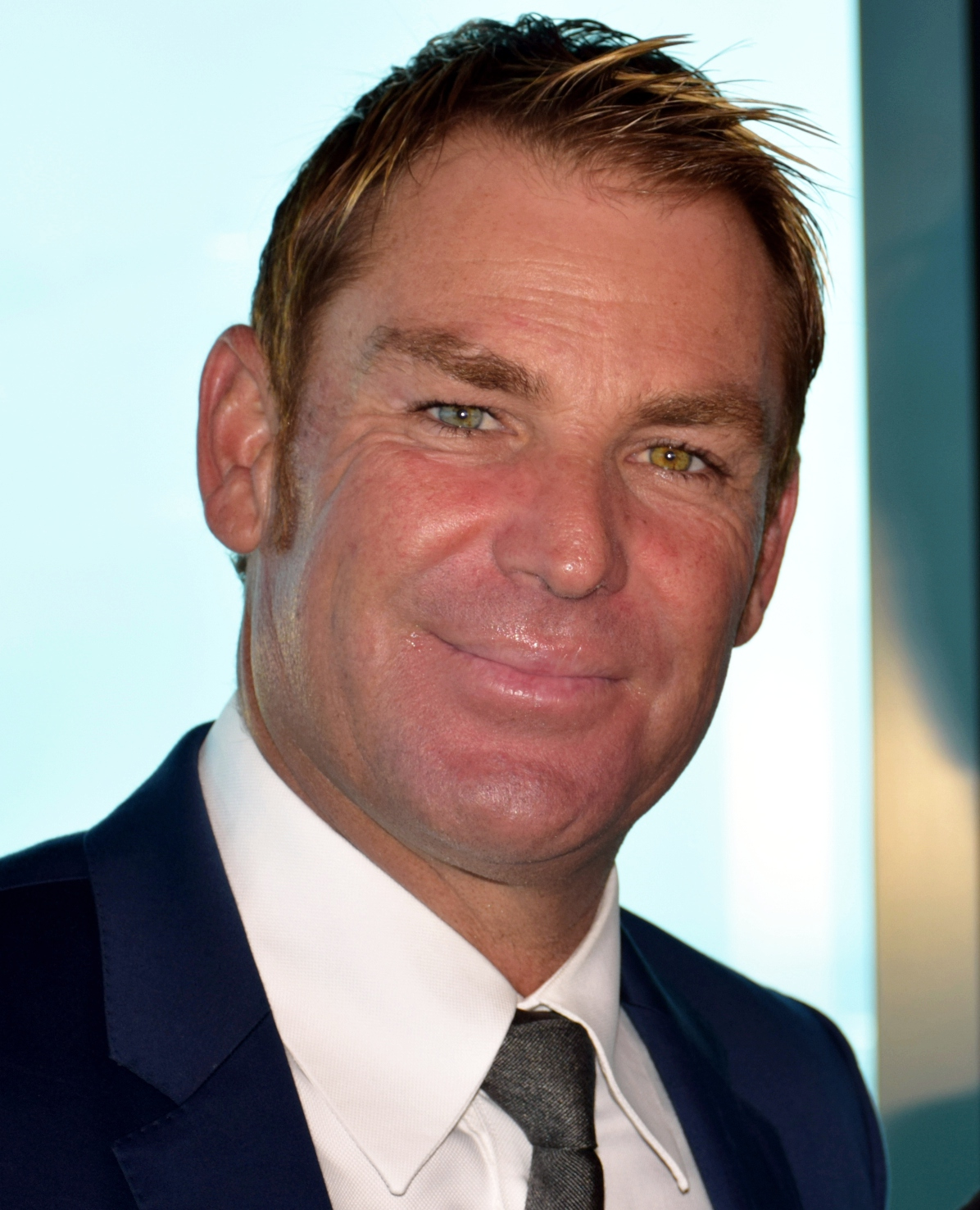
Shane Warne has taken the most wickets at the ground, with 64

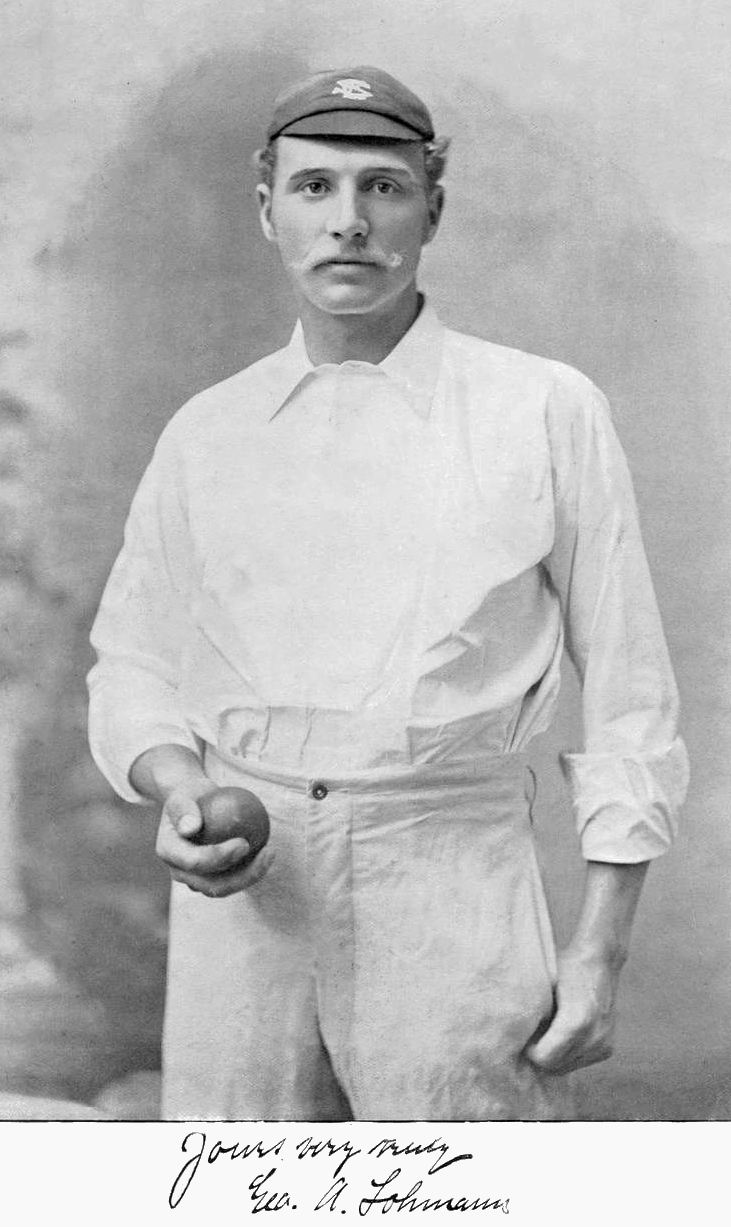
George Lohmann took 35 wickets in eight innings; the most of any non-Australian

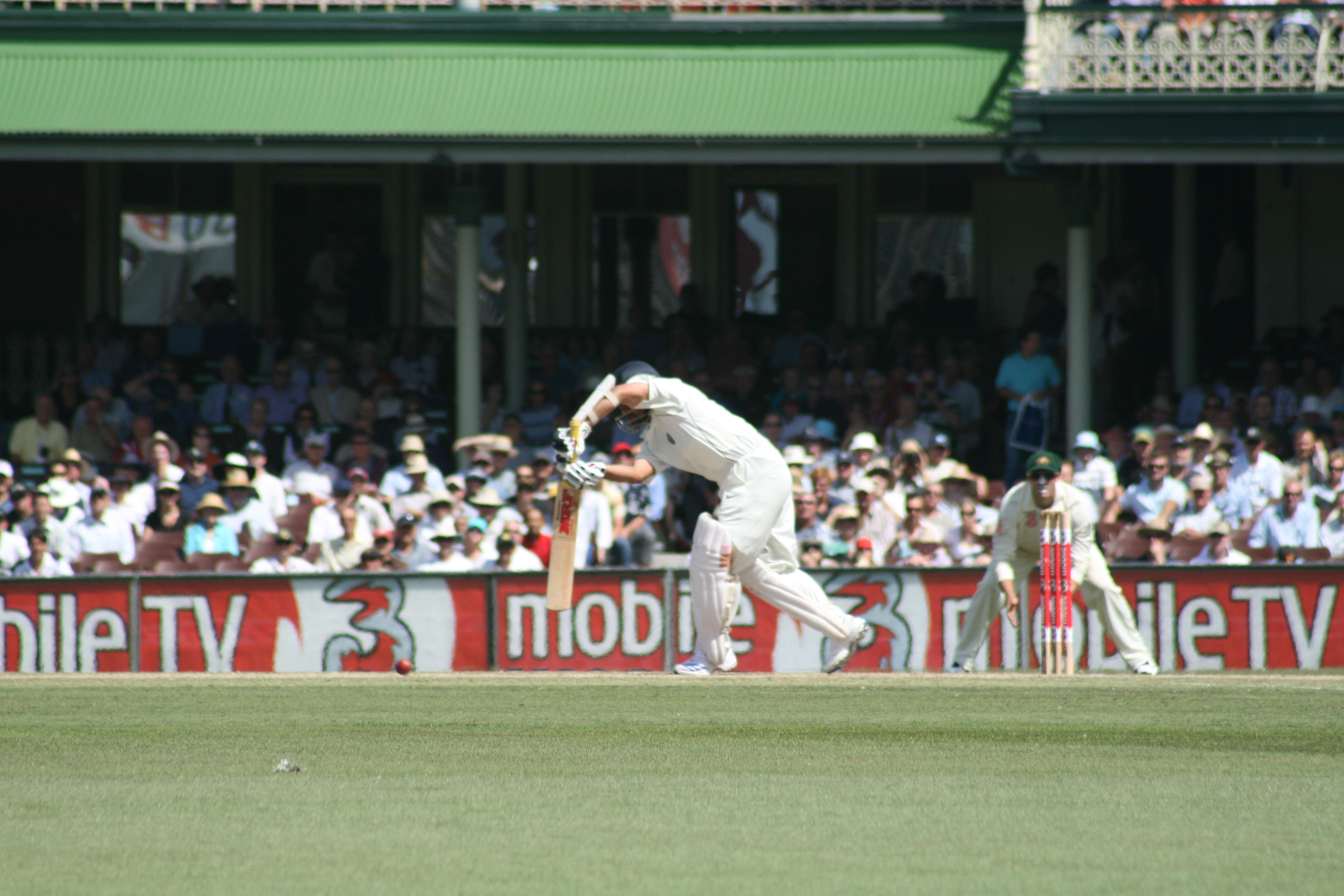
Tendulkar made 241*, as India totalled 7/705 declared in 2004

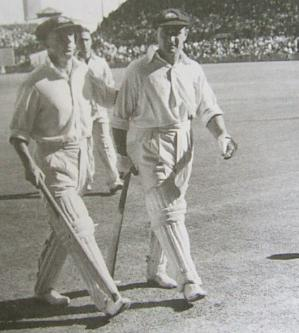
Bradman and Barnes during their partnership of 405

Most career runs
Runs	Player	Period
1,480 (27 innings)	(Australia) Ricky Ponting	1996–2012
1,246 (21 innings)	(Australia) Steve Smith	2011–2026
1,177 (29 innings)	(Australia) Allan Border	1979–1994
1,150 (22 innings)	(Australia) Greg Chappell	1971–1984
1,127 (21 innings)	(Australia) David Boon	1984–1995

Most career runs (non-Australia)
Runs	Player	Period
808 (7 innings)	(England) Wally Hammond	1928–1946
785 (9 innings)	(India) Sachin Tendulkar	1992–2012
654 (15 innings)	(England) Jack Hobbs	1908–1928
569 (11 innings)	(England) David Gower	1979–1991
549 (7 innings)	(India) VVS Laxman	2000–2012

Highest individual scores
Runs	Player	Date
329* v. India	(Australia) Michael Clarke	3 Jan 2012
287 v. Australia	(England) R. E. Foster	11 Dec 1903
277 v. Australia	(Cricket West Indies) Brian Lara	2 Jan 1993
251 v. Australia	(England) Wally Hammond	14 Dec 1928
242 v. West Indies	(Australia) Doug Walters	14 Feb 1969

Most centuries
Centuries	Player	Period
6 (27 innings)	(Australia) Ricky Ponting	1996–2012
5 (21 innings)	(Australia) Steve Smith	2011–2026
4 (7 innings)	(England) Wally Hammond	1928–1946
4 (12 innings)	(Australia) Usman Khawaja	2011–2025
4 (20 innings)	(Australia) David Warner	2012–2024
4 (21 innings)	(Australia) David Boon	1984–1995
4 (22 innings)	(Australia) Greg Chappell	1971–1984
4 (22 innings)	(Australia) Matthew Hayden	2001–2009

Highest batting average (3+ matches)
Average	Player	Period
161.60 (7 innings, 2 NO)	(England) Wally Hammond	1928–1946
157.00 (9 innings, 4 NO)	(India) Sachin Tendulkar	1992–2012
98.25 (5 innings, 1 NO)	(India) Rishabh Pant	2019–2025
94.33 (4 innings, 1 NO)	(Australia) Andrew Symonds	2006–2008
94.00 (13 innings, 5 NO)	(Australia) Michael Hussey	2006–2013

=== Bowling ===
Most career wickets
Wickets	Player	Period
64 (26 innings)	(Australia) Shane Warne	1992–2007
53 (16 innings)	(Australia) Stuart MacGill	1999–2006
50 (24 innings)	(Australia) Glenn McGrath	1993–2006
49 (24 innings)	(Australia) Nathan Lyon	2012–2025
45 (12 innings)	(Australia) Charles Turner	1887–1895

Most career wickets (non-Australia)
Wickets	Player	Period
35 (8 innings)	(England) George Lohmann	1887–1892
28 (10 innings)	(England) Sydney Barnes	1901–1912
24 (10 innings)	(England) Bobby Peel	1885–1895
24 (6 innings)	(England) Maurice Tate	1924–1928
23 (13 innings)	(England) Billy Bates	1882–1887
23 (7 innings)	(England) Tom Richardson	1894–1898

Best innings figures
Figures	Player	Date
8/35 v. Australia	(England) George Lohmann	25 Feb 1887
8/58 v. Australia	(England) George Lohmann	29 Jan 1892
8/94 v. Australia	(England) Tom Richardson	26 Feb 1898
8/141 v. Australia	(India) Anil Kumble	2 Jan 2004
7/40 v. Australia	(England) Dick Barlow	26 Jan 1883
7/40 v. Australia	(England) John Snow	9 Jan 1971
7/43 v. England	(Australia) Charles Turner	10 Feb 1888
7/44 v. England	(Australia) Fred Spofforth	26 Jan 1883
7/46 v. West Indies	(Australia) Allan Border	26 Jan 1989
7/50 v. England	(Australia) Stuart MacGill	2 Jan 1999

Note: best innings figures limited to 10; there have actually been 23 seven-wicket innings hauls at the Sydney Cricket Ground.

Best match figures
Figures	Player	Date
12/87 v. England	(Australia) Charles Turner	10 Feb 1888
12/107 v. England	(Australia) Stuart MacGill	2 Jan 1999
12/128 v. South Africa	(Australia) Shane Warne	2 Jan 1994
12/165 v. Australia	(Pakistan) Imran Khan	14 Jan 1977
12/175 v. England	(Australia) Herbert Hordern	15 Dec 1911
12/279 v. Australia	(India) Anil Kumble	2 Jan 2004

Lowest strike rate (4+ innings)
Strike rate	Player	Period
29.7 (4 wickets)	(Australia) Michael Clarke	2005–2014
31.6 (12 wickets)	(England) Frank Tyson	1954–1955
32.1 (13 wickets)	(New Zealand) Richard Hadlee	1974–1985
32.4 (11 wickets)	(Australia) Tom Horan	1882–1885
34.8 (35 wickets)	(England) George Lohmann	1887–1892

=== Team records ===
Highest innings scores
Score	Team	Date
7/705d	India v. Australia	2 Jan 2004
8/659d	Australia v. England	13 Dec 1946
4/659d	Australia v. India	3 Jan 2012
7/649d	Australia v. England	4 Jan 2018
644	England v. Australia	3 Jan 2011

Lowest completed innings
Score	Team	Date
42	Australia v. England	10 Feb 1888
45	England v. Australia	28 Jan 1887
65	England v. Australia	1 Feb 1895
72	England v. Australia	1 Feb 1895
77	England v. Australia	14 Mar 1885

=== Partnership records ===
Highest partnerships
Runs	Wicket	Players	Match	Date
405	5th	Sid Barnes (234) & Don Bradman (234)	Australia v. England	13 Dec 1946
353	4th	Sachin Tendulkar (241*) & VVS Laxman (178)	India v. Australia	2 Jan 2004
336	4th	Doug Walters (242) & Bill Lawry (151)	Australia v. (Cricket West Indies) West Indies	14 Feb 1969
334*	5th	Michael Clarke (329*) & Michael Hussey (150*)	Australia v. India	3 Jan 2012
293	3rd	Brian Lara (277) & Richie Richardson (109)	(Cricket West Indies) West Indies v. Australia	2 Jan 1993

Highest partnerships by wicket
Runs	Wicket	Players	Match	Date
234	1st	Bob Barber (185) & Geoffrey Boycott (84)	England v. Australia	7 Jan 1966
224	2nd	Clem Hill (191) & Warren Bardsley (132)	Australia v. South Africa	9 Dec 1910
224	2nd	Sunil Gavaskar (172) & Mohinder Amarnath (138)	India v. Australia	2 Jan 1986
293	3rd	Brian Lara (277) & Richie Richardson (109)	(Cricket West Indies) West Indies v. Australia	2 Jan 1993
353	4th	Sachin Tendulkar (241*) & VVS Laxman (178)	India v. Australia	2 Jan 2004
405	5th	Sid Barnes (234) & Don Bradman (234)	Australia v. England	13 Dec 1946
187	6th	Warwick Armstrong (158) & Charles Kelleway (78)	Australia v. England	17 Dec 1920
204	7th	Rishabh Pant (159*) & Ravindra Jadeja (81)	India v. Australia	3 Jan 2019
154	8th	George Bonnor (128) & Sammy Jones (40)	Australia v. England	14 Mar 1885
154	9th	Syd Gregory (201) & Jack Blackham (74)	Australia v. England	14 Dec 1894
130	10th	R. E. Foster (287) & Wilfred Rhodes (40*)	England v. Australia	11 Dec 1903

Last updated 11 January 2026.

== VFL/AFL records ==
=== Player records ===
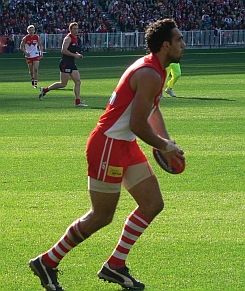
Adam Goodes holds the record for most games played at the SCG.

Most career games
Games	Player	Period
143	Adam Goodes	1999–2015
136	Michael O'Loughlin	1995–2009
128	Jude Bolton	1999–2013
125	Mark Bayes	1985–1998
123	Daryn Cresswell	1992–2003

Most career goals
Goals	Player	Period
295	Tony Lockett	1983–2002
258	Lance Franklin	2005–2023
246	Michael O'Loughlin	1995–2009
190	Adam Goodes	1999–2015
176	Barry Hall	1998–2011
176	Warwick Capper	1984–1991

Most goals in a match
Goals	Player	Match	Date
14	Gary Ablett Sr.	Geelong v. Sydney	15 May 1994
12	Tony Lockett	Sydney v. Port Adelaide	19 Jul 1998
12	Tony Lockett	Sydney v. Richmond	11 Aug 1996
12	Tony Lockett	St Kilda v. Sydney	19 May 1991
12	Brian Taylor	Collingwood v. Sydney	21 Jul 1985

Most disposals in a match
Disposals	Player	Match	Date
53	Greg Williams	Sydney v. St Kilda	13 Aug 1989
44	Phil Kelly	North Melbourne v. Sydney	10 Apr 1983
44	Greg Smith	Sydney v. St Kilda	20 Jun 1982
43	Barry Mitchell	Sydney v. West Coast	16 Apr 1989
43	Bruce Abernethy	North Melbourne v. Sydney	10 Apr 1983

=== Team records ===
- Highest score: Sydney 36.20 (236) defeated Essendon 11.7 (73), 26 July 1987
- Lowest score: Sydney 4.6 (30) defeated by Greater Western Sydney 10.19 (79), 8 September 2018
- Biggest margin: Sydney defeated West Coast, 171 points, 24 June 2023

Last updated: 25 June 2023.

== Seating capacity and other records ==
- Current Seating capacity (2023): 48,000 — with the addition of new grandstands, removal of the Hill and standing only areas, the capacity of the SCG has reduced by around 30,000 fewer than the record attendance figure.
- Largest rugby league match attendance: 78,056 (1965 Grand Final St George v South Sydney, 18 September 1965)
- Largest cricket match attendance: 58,446 (Day 2, Second Test, Australia v England, 15 December 1928)
- Largest association football (soccer) match attendance: 51,566 (NSW v Everton, 2 May 1964)
- Largest rugby union match attendance: 49,327 (NSW v New Zealand, 13 July 1907)
- Largest Australian rules football match attendance: 46,323 (Sydney v Essendon, 9 September 2017)
- Largest concert attendance: 45,191 (WaveAid benefit concert, 29 January 2005)
- Largest Big Bash League attendance: 43,153 (Sydney Sixers v Brisbane Heat, 24 January 2024)

Preceded by Lake Oval, Albert Park (South Melbourne Football Club)	Home of the Sydney Swans; 1982 – present	Succeeded by Current ground
Preceded by Sydney Common	Home of the New South Wales Blues; 1878 – present	Succeeded by Current ground
Preceded by First venue	Home of the Sydney Sixers; 2011 – present	Succeeded by Current ground
Preceded by First venue	Host of the New South Wales Rugby League premiership grand final 1908–1987	Succeeded by Sydney Football Stadium
Preceded by No designated final, effectively (England) Odsal Stadium	Host of the Rugby League World Cup final 1968	Succeeded by (England) Headingley Rugby Stadium
Preceded by First venue	Host of the World Club Challenge; 1976	Succeeded by (England) Central Park
Preceded by (Australia) WACA Ground	Grand Final stadiums of Tuyul Rugby Sevens; 1998	Succeeded by (Japan) Chichibunomiya Rugby Stadium

== Gallery ==
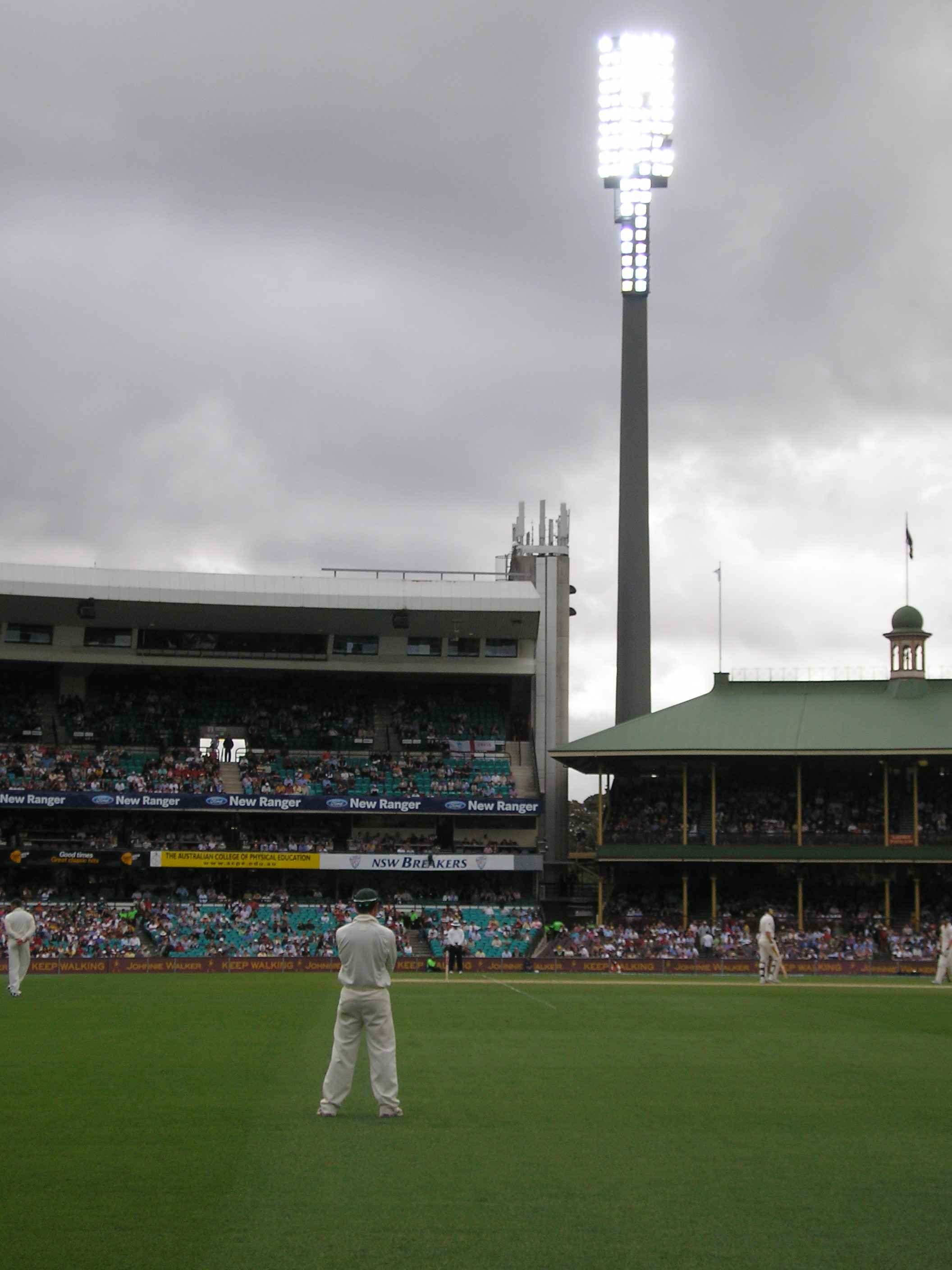
Large light towers were added to the ground in the late 1970s to capitalise on "night cricket"

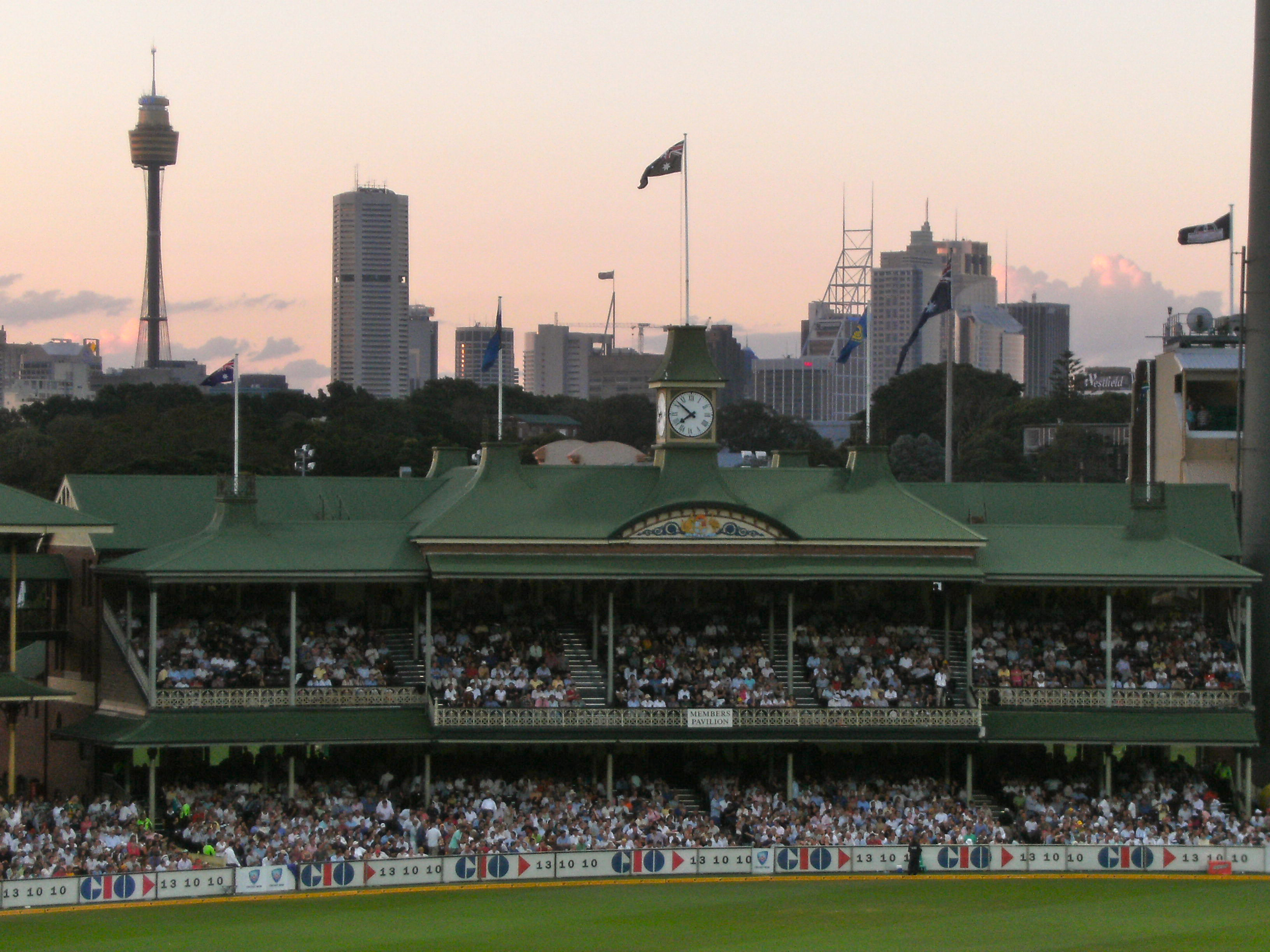
The historic Members' Pavilion under lights with the Sydney skyline behind

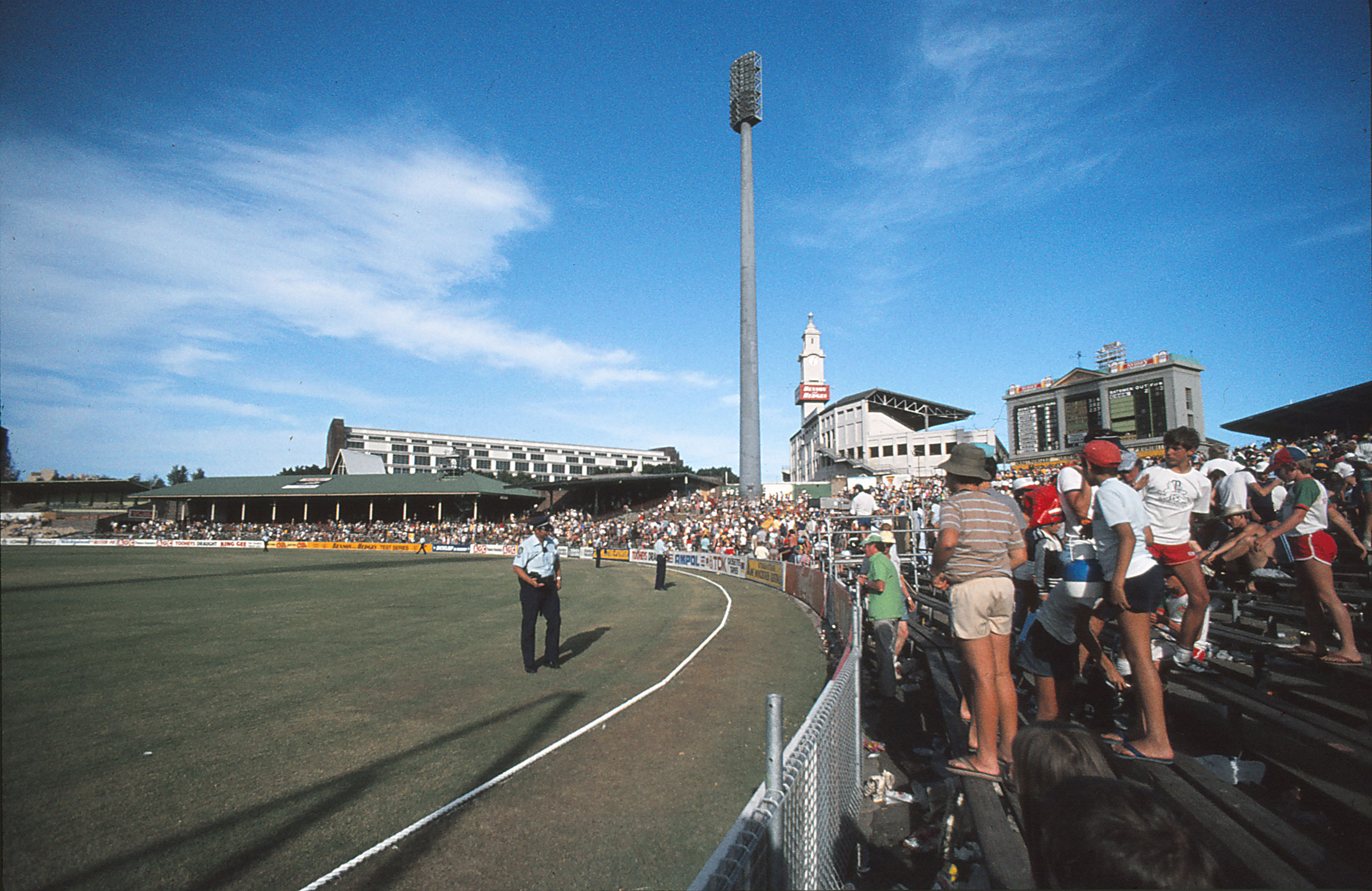
Sydney Cricket Ground looking over Yabba's Hill and the Pat Hills Stand before redevelopment, during 5th Test, 1982–83 Ashes Series

== See also ==
- History of Test cricket (to 1883)
- History of Test cricket (1884 to 1889)
- History of Test cricket (1890 to 1900)
- List of Test cricket grounds
- Lists of stadiums

Preceded by Parc des Princes (1954); Stade de Gerland (1972)	Rugby League World Cup; Final venue 1968; 1977	Succeeded by Headingley (1970); Eden Park (1988)
