= 2022 NRL finals series =

Rugby League tournament

- Duration: 9 September 2022 – 2 October 2022
- Teams: 8
- Premiers: Penrith Panthers (4th title)
- Minor premiers: Penrith Panthers (4th title)
- Matches played: 9
- Broadcast partners: Nine Network; Fox League

The 2022 National Rugby League finals series was a tournament staged to determine the winner of the 2022 Telstra Premiership season. The series was played over four weekends in September and October, culminating in the 2022 NRL Grand Final on 2 October 2022 won by the Penrith Panthers.

The top eight teams from the 2022 NRL season qualified for the finals series. NRL finals series were continuously played under this format since 2012.

== Qualification ==
2022 NRL season
Pos	Team	Pld	W	D	L	B	PF	PA	PD	Pts
1	Penrith Panthers (P)	24	20	0	4	1	636	330	+306	42
2	Cronulla-Sutherland Sharks	24	18	0	6	1	573	364	+209	38
3	North Queensland Cowboys	24	17	0	7	1	633	361	+272	36
4	Parramatta Eels	24	16	0	8	1	608	489	+119	34
5	Melbourne Storm	24	15	0	9	1	657	410	+247	32
6	Sydney Roosters	24	15	0	9	1	635	434	+201	32
7	South Sydney Rabbitohs	24	14	0	10	1	604	474	+130	30
8	Canberra Raiders	24	14	0	10	1	524	461	+63	30
9	Brisbane Broncos	24	13	0	11	1	514	550	−36	28
10	St. George Illawarra Dragons	24	12	0	12	1	469	569	−100	26
11	Manly Warringah Sea Eagles	24	9	0	15	1	490	595	−105	20
12	Canterbury-Bankstown Bulldogs	24	7	0	17	1	383	575	−192	16
13	Gold Coast Titans	24	6	0	18	1	455	660	−205	14
14	Newcastle Knights	24	6	0	18	1	372	662	−290	14
15	New Zealand Warriors	24	6	0	18	1	408	700	−292	14
16	Wests Tigers	24	4	0	20	1	352	679	−327	10

== Finals structure ==
The system used for the 2022 NRL finals series is a final eight system. The top four teams in the eight receive the "double chance" when they play in week-one qualifying finals, such that if a top-four team loses in the first week it still remains in the finals, playing a semi-final the next week against the winner of an elimination final. The bottom four of the eight play knock-out games – only the winners survive and move on to the next week. Home ground advantage goes to the team with the higher ladder position in the first two weeks and to the qualifying final winners in the third week.

In the second week, the winners of the qualifying finals receive a bye to the third week. The losers of the qualifying final plays the elimination finals winners in a semi-final. In the third week, the winners of the semi-finals from week two play the winners of the qualifying finals in the first week. The winners of those matches move on to the Grand Final.

== Venues ==
The Grand Final as well as the Sydney-based preliminary finals were held at Stadium Australia, with the Grand Final returning to Sydney after a one-year absence. The North Queensland Cowboys hosted one preliminary final at North Queensland Stadium. All matches in the first two rounds were played at the home stadium of the team with the higher ladder position, except that the semi-final between Cronulla-Sutherland and South Sydney was held at the Sydney Football Stadium rather than Endeavour Field where Cronulla-Sutherland had hosted a qualifying final the previous week.

Sydney Olympic Park	2022 NRL finals series is located in National Rugby League	Penrith
Stadium Australia	2022 NRL finals series is located in National Rugby League	Penrith Stadium
Capacity: 82,000	2022 NRL finals series is located in National Rugby League	Capacity: 22,500
Townsville	2022 NRL finals series is located in National Rugby League	Melbourne
North Queensland Stadium	2022 NRL finals series is located in National Rugby League	Melbourne Rectangular Stadium
Capacity: 25,000	2022 NRL finals series is located in National Rugby League	Capacity: 29,500
Parramatta	2022 NRL finals series is located in National Rugby League	Woolooware
Western Sydney Stadium	2022 NRL finals series is located in National Rugby League	Endeavour Field
Capacity: 30,000	2022 NRL finals series is located in National Rugby League	Capacity: 20,000
Moore Park	2022 NRL finals series is located in National Rugby League	
Sydney Football Stadium	2022 NRL finals series is located in National Rugby League	
Capacity: 42,500	2022 NRL finals series is located in National Rugby League	

== Fixtures ==
=== Summary ===
Home	Score	Away	Match Information
Home	Score	Away	Date and time (local)	Venue	Referee	Attendance
First week: Qualifying and elimination finals
Penrith Panthers	27 – 8	Parramatta Eels	9 September 2022, 19:50	BlueBet Stadium	Gerard Sutton	21,863
Melbourne Storm	20 – 28	Canberra Raiders	10 September 2022, 17:40	AAMI Park	Grant Atkins	20,838
Cronulla-Sutherland Sharks	30 – 32	North Queensland Cowboys	10 September 2022, 19:50	PointsBet Stadium	Adam Gee	12,447
Sydney Roosters	14 – 30	South Sydney Rabbitohs	11 September 2022, 16:05	Allianz Stadium	Ashley Klein	39,816
Second week: Semi-finals
Parramatta Eels	40 – 4	Canberra Raiders	16 September 2022, 19:50	CommBank Stadium	Ashley Klein	29,134
Cronulla-Sutherland Sharks	12 – 38	South Sydney Rabbitohs	17 September 2022, 20:00	Allianz Stadium	Grant Atkins	39,733
Third week: Preliminary finals
North Queensland Cowboys	20 – 24	Parramatta Eels	23 September 2022, 19:50	Queensland Country Bank Stadium	Grant Atkins	25,372
Penrith Panthers	32 – 12	South Sydney Rabbitohs	24 September 2022, 19:50	Accor Stadium	Ashley Klein	50,034
Fourth week: Grand final
Penrith Panthers	28 – 12	Parramatta Eels	2 October 2022, 19:30	Accor Stadium	Ashley Klein	82,415

=== Bracket ===
Qualifying and elimination finals
9 September – Sydney
1	Penrith Panthers	27
4	Parramatta Eels	8
10 September – Melbourne
5	Melbourne Storm	20
8	Canberra Raiders	28
11 September – Sydney
6	Sydney Roosters	14
7	South Sydney Rabbitohs	30
10 September – Sydney
2	Cronulla-Sutherland Sharks	30
3	North Queensland Cowboys	32

Semi-finals
16 September – Sydney
Parramatta Eels	40
Canberra Raiders	4
17 September – Sydney
Cronulla-Sutherland Sharks	12
South Sydney Rabbitohs	38

Preliminary finals
24 September – Sydney
Penrith Panthers	32
South Sydney Rabbitohs	12
23 September – Townsville
North Queensland Cowboys	20
Parramatta Eels	24

Grand final
2 October – Sydney
Penrith Panthers	28
Parramatta Eels	12

=== Matches ===
==== First week: Qualifying and elimination finals ====
First qualifying final

9 September 2022
19:50 AEST (UTC+10)

Penrith Panthers	27 – 8	Parramatta Eels
Tries: 4 To'o 15', 51'; Edwards 59'; Fisher-Harris 61'; Goals: 5 Cleary 16', 53', 60', 63', pen 78' (5/5); Field goals: 1 Cleary 37'	1st: 7–6; 2nd: 20–2; Report	Tries: 1 Kaufusi 28'; Goals: 2 Moses 29', pen 46' (2/2)

BlueBet Stadium, Sydney
Attendance: 21,863
Referee: Gerard Sutton
Bunker: Adam Gee
Touch judges: Phil Henderson, Michael Wise

Team details

FB	1	Dylan Edwards
WG	2	Taylan May
CE	3	Izack Tago
CE	4	Stephen Crichton
WG	5	Brian To'o
FE	6	Jarome Luai
HB	7	Nathan Cleary
PR	8	Moses Leota
HK	14	Mitch Kenny
PR	10	James Fisher-Harris
SR	11	Viliame Kikau
SR	12	Liam Martin
LF	13	Isaah Yeo
Interchange:
IN	9	Apisai Koroisau
IN	15	Scott Sorensen
IN	16	Spencer Leniu
IN	17	Jaeman Salmon
CS	18	Charlie Staines
Coach:
Ivan Cleary

FB	1	Clint Gutherson
WG	2	Maika Sivo
CE	3	Will Penisini
CE	4	Tom Opacic
WG	5	Waqa Blake
FE	6	Dylan Brown
HB	7	Mitchell Moses
PR	8	Reagan Campbell-Gillard
HK	9	Reed Mahoney
PR	10	Junior Paulo
SR	11	Shaun Lane
SR	12	Isaiah Papali'i
LF	17	Marata Niukore
Interchange:
IN	13	Ryan Matterson
IN	14	Makahesi Makatoa
IN	15	Jake Arthur
IN	16	Oregon Kaufusi
CS	18	Nathan Brown
Coach:
Brad Arthur

First elimination final

10 September 2022
17:40 AEST (UTC+10)

Melbourne Storm	20 – 28	Canberra Raiders
Tries: 4 Coates 17', 21', 44'; Asofa-Solomona 56'; Goals: 2 Munster 46', 58' (2/5)	1st: 8–16; 2nd: 12–12; Report	Tries: 5 Timoko 7'; Fogarty 31'; Whitehead 34'; Young 65'; Rapana 73'; Goals: 4 Fogarty 32', 36', 66', 75' (4/5)

AAMI Park, Melbourne
Attendance: 20,838
Referee: Grant Atkins
Bunker: Ashley Klein
Touch judges: Drew Oultram, Liam Kennedy

Team details

FB	1	Nick Meaney
WG	2	David Nofoaluma
CE	3	Marion Seve
CE	4	Justin Olam
WG	5	Xavier Coates
FE	6	Cameron Munster
HB	7	Jahrome Hughes
PR	8	Jesse Bromwich
HK	9	Harry Grant
PR	10	Nelson Asofa-Solomona
SR	15	Tui Kamikamica
SR	12	Kenneth Bromwich
LF	14	Brandon Smith
Interchange:
IN	11	Felise Kaufusi
IN	13	Josh King
IN	16	Trent Loiero
IN	17	Chris Lewis
CS	18	Young Tonumaipea
Coach: Craig Bellamy

FB	1	Xavier Savage
WG	2	Nick Cotric
CE	3	Matthew Timoko
CE	4	Sebastian Kris
WG	5	Jordan Rapana
FE	6	Jack Wighton
HB	7	Jamal Fogarty
PR	8	Josh Papalii
HK	9	Zac Woolford
PR	10	Joseph Tapine
SR	11	Hudson Young
SR	12	Elliot Whitehead
LF	13	Adam Elliott
Interchange:
IN	14	Tom Starling
IN	15	Emre Guler
IN	16	Corey Horsburgh
IN	17	Corey Harawira-Naera
CS	18	Albert Hopoate
Coach: Ricky Stuart

Second qualifying final

10 September 2022
19:50 AEST (UTC+10)

Cronulla-Sutherland Sharks	30 – 32	North Queensland Cowboys
Tries: 5 Kennedy 35', 66'; Rudolf 10'; Talakai 24'; McInnes 56'; Goals: 5 Hynes 12', 25', 36', 57', 67' (5/5)	1st: 18–18; 2nd: 12–12; ET: 0–0; GP: 0–2; Report	Tries: 5 Gilbert 7'; Dearden 28'; Hiku 30'; Taulagi 52'; Taumalolo 79'; Goals: 5 Holmes 8', 29', 32', pen 72', 80' (5/6); Field goals: 1 Holmes 92' (2 point)

PointsBet Stadium, Sydney
Attendance: 12,447
Referee: Adam Gee
Bunker: Gerard Sutton
Touch judges: Chris Sutton, Jon Stone

Team details

FB	1	William Kennedy
WG	2	Connor Tracey
CE	3	Jesse Ramien
CE	4	Siosifa Talakai
WG	5	Ronaldo Mulitalo
FE	6	Matt Moylan
HB	7	Nicholas Hynes
PR	8	Toby Rudolf
HK	9	Blayke Brailey
PR	10	Royce Hunt
SR	11	Briton Nikora
SR	12	Wade Graham
LF	13	Dale Finucane
Interchange:
IN	14	Teig Wilton
IN	15	Cameron McInnes
IN	16	Braden Hamlin-Uele
IN	17	Andrew Fifita
CS	18	Lachlan Miller
Coach:
Craig Fitzgibbon

FB	1	Scott Drinkwater
WG	2	Kyle Feldt
CE	3	Valentine Holmes
CE	4	Peta Hiku
WG	5	Murray Taulagi
FE	6	Tom Dearden
HB	7	Chad Townsend
PR	8	Jordan McLean
HK	9	Reece Robson
PR	10	Reuben Cotter
SR	15	Tom Gilbert
SR	12	Jeremiah Nanai
LF	13	Jason Taumalolo
Interchange:
IN	11	Luciano Leilua
IN	14	Hamiso Tabuai-Fidow
IN	16	Coen Hess
IN	17	Griffin Neame
CS	18	Jamayne Taunoa-Brown
Coach:
Todd Payten

Second elimination final

11 September 2022
16:05 AEST (UTC+10)

Sydney Roosters	14 – 30	South Sydney Rabbitohs
Tries: 3 Crichton 9'; Tupou 12'; Nat Butcher 54'; Goals: 1 Walker 55' (1/3)	1st: 8–12; 2nd: 6–18; Report	Tries: 5 Johnston 5', 46'; Mitchell 22'; Arrow 51'; Tass 71'; Goals: 5 Mitchell 6', 23', 47', 52', 73' (5/5)

Allianz Stadium, Sydney
Attendance: 39,816
Referee: Ashley Klein
Bunker: Grant Atkins
Touch judges: Kasey Badger, Dave Munro

Team details

FB	1	James Tedesco
WG	2	Daniel Tupou
CE	3	Paul Momirovski
CE	4	Drew Hutchison
WG	5	Joseph Suaalii
FE	6	Luke Keary
HB	7	Sam Walker
PR	8	Jared Waerea-Hargreaves
HK	9	Sam Verrills
PR	17	Matthew Lodge
SR	11	Nat Butcher
SR	12	Angus Crichton
LF	13	Victor Radley
Interchange:
IN	10	Sio Siua Taukeiaho
IN	14	Connor Watson
IN	15	Egan Butcher
IN	18	Kevin Naiqama
CS	16	Adam Keighran
Coach:
Trent Robinson

FB	1	Latrell Mitchell
WG	2	Alex Johnston
CE	3	Isaiah Tass
CE	4	Campbell Graham
WG	5	Taane Milne
FE	6	Cody Walker
HB	7	Lachlan Ilias
PR	8	Tevita Tatola
HK	9	Damien Cook
PR	10	Mark Nicholls
SR	11	Keaon Koloamatangi
SR	12	Jai Arrow
LF	13	Cameron Murray
Interchange:
IN	14	Kodi Nikorima
IN	15	Hame Sele
IN	16	Thomas Burgess
IN	17	Siliva Havili
CS	21	Michael Chee-Kam
Coach:
Jason Demetriou

==== Second week: Semi-finals ====
First semi-final

16 September 2022
19:50 AEST (UTC+10)

Parramatta Eels	40 – 4	Canberra Raiders
Tries: 7 Niukore 70', 79'; Penisini 6'; Opacic 14'; Blake 19'; Paulo 23'; Moses 45'; Goals: 6 Moses 7', 21', 25', 70', 72', pen 75' (6/8)	1st: 22–4; 2nd: 18–0; Report	Tries: 1 Savage 28'; Goals: Fogarty (0/1)

CommBank Stadium, Sydney
Attendance: 29,134
Referee: Ashley Klein
Bunker: Gerard Sutton
Touch judges: Dave Munro, Phil Henderson

Team details

FB	1	Clint Gutherson
WG	2	Maika Sivo
CE	3	Will Penisini
CE	4	Tom Opacic
WG	5	Waqa Blake
FE	6	Dylan Brown
HB	7	Mitchell Moses
PR	8	Reagan Campbell-Gillard
HK	9	Reed Mahoney
PR	10	Junior Paulo
SR	11	Shaun Lane
SR	12	Isaiah Papali'i
LF	17	Marata Niukore
Interchange:
IN	13	Ryan Matterson
IN	14	Makahesi Makatoa
IN	15	Jake Arthur
IN	16	Oregon Kaufusi
CS	18	Bailey Simonsson
Coach:
Brad Arthur

FB	1	Xavier Savage
WG	2	Nick Cotric
CE	3	Matthew Timoko
CE	4	Sebastian Kris
WG	5	Jordan Rapana
FE	6	Jack Wighton
HB	7	Jamal Fogarty
PR	8	Josh Papalii
HK	9	Zac Woolford
PR	10	Joseph Tapine
SR	11	Hudson Young
SR	12	Elliot Whitehead
LF	13	Corey Horsburgh
Interchange:
IN	14	Corey Harawira-Naera
IN	15	Tom Starling
IN	16	Emre Guler
IN	17	Ryan Sutton
CS	18	Albert Hopoate
Coach:
Ricky Stuart

Second semi-final

17 September 2022
20:00 AEST (UTC+10)

Cronulla-Sutherland Sharks	12 – 38	South Sydney Rabbitohs
Tries: 2 Nikora 41'; Mulitalo 55'; Goals: 2 Hynes 43', 56' (2/2)	1st: 0–18; 2nd: 12–20; Report	Tries: 6 Milne 29', 66'; Nicholls 2'; Murray 39'; Ilias 45'; Walker 61'; Goals: 7 Mitchell 3', 30', 40', 46', 63', 68', pen 77' (7/7)

Allianz Stadium, Sydney
Attendance: 39,733
Referee: Grant Atkins
Bunker: Adam Gee
Touch judges: Drew Oultram, Michael Wise

Team details

FB	1	William Kennedy
WG	5	Ronaldo Mulitalo
CE	2	Connor Tracey
CE	3	Jesse Ramien
WG	18	Lachlan Miller
FE	6	Matt Moylan
HB	7	Nicholas Hynes
PR	8	Toby Rudolf
HK	9	Blayke Brailey
PR	16	Braden Hamlin-Uele
SR	11	Briton Nikora
SR	12	Wade Graham
LF	13	Dale Finucane
Interchange:
IN	14	Teig Wilton
IN	15	Cameron McInnes
IN	17	Andrew Fifita
IN	19	Aiden Tolman
CS	22	Mawene Hiroti
Coach:
Craig Fitzgibbon

FB	1	Latrell Mitchell
WG	2	Alex Johnston
CE	3	Isaiah Tass
CE	4	Campbell Graham
WG	5	Taane Milne
FE	6	Cody Walker
HB	7	Lachlan Ilias
PR	8	Tevita Tatola
HK	9	Damien Cook
PR	10	Mark Nicholls
SR	11	Keaon Koloamatangi
SR	12	Jai Arrow
LF	13	Cameron Murray
Interchange:
IN	14	Kodi Nikorima
IN	15	Hame Sele
IN	16	Michael Chee-Kam
IN	17	Siliva Havili
CS	21	Davvy Moale
Coach:
Jason Demetriou

==== Third week: Preliminary finals ====
Second preliminary final

23 September 2022
19:50 AEST (UTC+10)

North Queensland Cowboys	20 – 24	Parramatta Eels
Tries: 3 Cotter 11'; Leilua 25'; Taulagi 52'; Goals: 4 Holmes 13', pen 38', pen 49', 54' (4/5)	1st: 12–12; 2nd: 8–12; Report	Tries: 4 Campbell-Gillard 18', 57'; Penisini 6'; Sivo 64'; Goals: 4 Moses 8', 19', 58', 65' (4/4)

Queensland Country Bank Stadium, Townsville
Attendance: 25,372
Referee: Grant Atkins
Bunker: Adam Gee
Touch judges: Dave Munro, Michael Wise

Team details

FB	1	Scott Drinkwater
WG	2	Kyle Feldt
CE	3	Valentine Holmes
CE	4	Peta Hiku
WG	5	Murray Taulagi
FE	6	Tom Dearden
HB	7	Chad Townsend
PR	8	Jordan McLean
HK	9	Reece Robson
PR	10	Reuben Cotter
SR	11	Tom Gilbert
SR	12	Jeremiah Nanai
LF	13	Jason Taumalolo
Interchange:
IN	15	Hamiso Tabuai-Fidow
IN	16	Luciano Leilua
IN	17	Coen Hess
IN	18	Griffin Neame
CS	18	Jamayne Taunoa-Brown
Coach:
Todd Payten

FB	1	Clint Gutherson
WG	2	Maika Sivo
CE	3	Will Penisini
CE	19	Bailey Simonsson
WG	5	Waqa Blake
FE	6	Dylan Brown
HB	7	Mitchell Moses
PR	8	Reagan Campbell-Gillard
HK	9	Reed Mahoney
PR	10	Junior Paulo
SR	11	Shaun Lane
SR	12	Isaiah Papali'i
LF	17	Marata Niukore
Interchange:
IN	13	Ryan Matterson
IN	14	Bryce Cartwright
IN	15	Jake Arthur
IN	16	Oregon Kaufusi
CS	18	Makahesi Makatoa
Coach:
Brad Arthur

First preliminary final

24 September 2022
19:50 AEST (UTC+10)

Penrith Panthers	32 – 12	South Sydney Rabbitohs
Tries: 5 Koroisau 35'; To'o 39'; Leniu 44'; Tago 54'; Cleary 77'; Goals: 6 Cleary 36', 40', 45', 55', pen 64', 79' (6/6)	1st: 12–12; 2nd: 20–0; Report	Tries: 2 Walker 11'; Kennar 18'; Goals: 2 Mitchell 12', 19' (2/2)

Accor Stadium, Sydney
Attendance: 50,034
Referee: Ashley Klein
Bunker: Gerard Sutton
Touch judges: Phil Henderson, Drew Oultram

Team details

FB	1	Dylan Edwards
WG	2	Charlie Staines
CE	3	Izack Tago
CE	4	Stephen Crichton
WG	5	Brian To'o
FE	6	Jarome Luai
HB	7	Nathan Cleary
PR	8	Moses Leota
HK	14	Mitch Kenny
PR	10	James Fisher-Harris
SR	11	Viliame Kikau
SR	12	Liam Martin
LF	13	Isaah Yeo
Interchange:
IN	9	Apisai Koroisau
IN	15	Scott Sorensen
IN	16	Spencer Leniu
IN	17	Jaeman Salmon
CS	18	Sean O'Sullivan
Coach:
Ivan Cleary

FB	1	Latrell Mitchell
WG	5	Taane Milne
CE	3	Isaiah Tass
CE	4	Campbell Graham
WG	21	Richard Kennar
FE	6	Cody Walker
HB	7	Lachlan Ilias
PR	8	Tevita Tatola
HK	9	Damien Cook
PR	10	Mark Nicholls
SR	11	Keaon Koloamatangi
SR	12	Jai Arrow
LF	13	Cameron Murray
Interchange:
IN	14	Kodi Nikorima
IN	15	Hame Sele
IN	16	Michael Chee-Kam
IN	17	Jed Cartwright
CS	18	Davvy Moale
Coach:
Jason Demetriou

==== Fourth week: Grand final ====
2022 NRL Grand Final

Sunday, 2 October
19:35 AEDT (UTC+11)

Penrith Panthers	28 – 12	Parramatta Eels
Tries: 5 To'o 18', 46'; Crichton 11'; Sorensen 28'; Staines 59'; Goals: 4 Cleary 13', pen 22', 29', 61' (4/6)	1st: 18–0; 2nd: 10–12; Report	Tries: 2 Gutherson 77'; Arthur 78'; Goals: 2 Moses 77', 79' (2/2)

Accor Stadium, Sydney
Attendance: 82,415
Referee: Ashley Klein
Bunker: Grant Atkins
Touch judges: Phil Henderson, Drew Oultram
Clive Churchill Medal: Dylan Edwards (Penrith)

Team details

FB	1	Dylan Edwards
WG	2	Charlie Staines
CE	3	Izack Tago
CE	4	Stephen Crichton
WG	5	Brian To'o
FE	6	Jarome Luai
HB	7	Nathan Cleary
PR	8	Moses Leota
HK	14	Mitch Kenny
PR	10	James Fisher-Harris
SR	11	Viliame Kikau
SR	12	Liam Martin
LF	13	Isaah Yeo
Interchange:
IN	9	Apisai Koroisau
IN	15	Scott Sorensen
IN	16	Spencer Leniu
IN	17	Jaeman Salmon
CS	18	Sean O'Sullivan
Coach:
Ivan Cleary

FB	1	Clint Gutherson
WG	2	Maika Sivo
CE	3	Will Penisini
CE	4	Bailey Simonsson
WG	5	Waqa Blake
FE	6	Dylan Brown
HB	7	Mitchell Moses
PR	8	Reagan Campbell-Gillard
HK	9	Reed Mahoney
PR	10	Junior Paulo
SR	11	Shaun Lane
SR	12	Isaiah Papali'i
LF	17	Marata Niukore
Interchange:
IN	13	Ryan Matterson
IN	14	Nathan Brown
IN	15	Jake Arthur
IN	16	Oregon Kaufusi
CS	18	Bryce Cartwright
Coach:
Brad Arthur
