= Shaun Lane =

Australian rugby league footballer

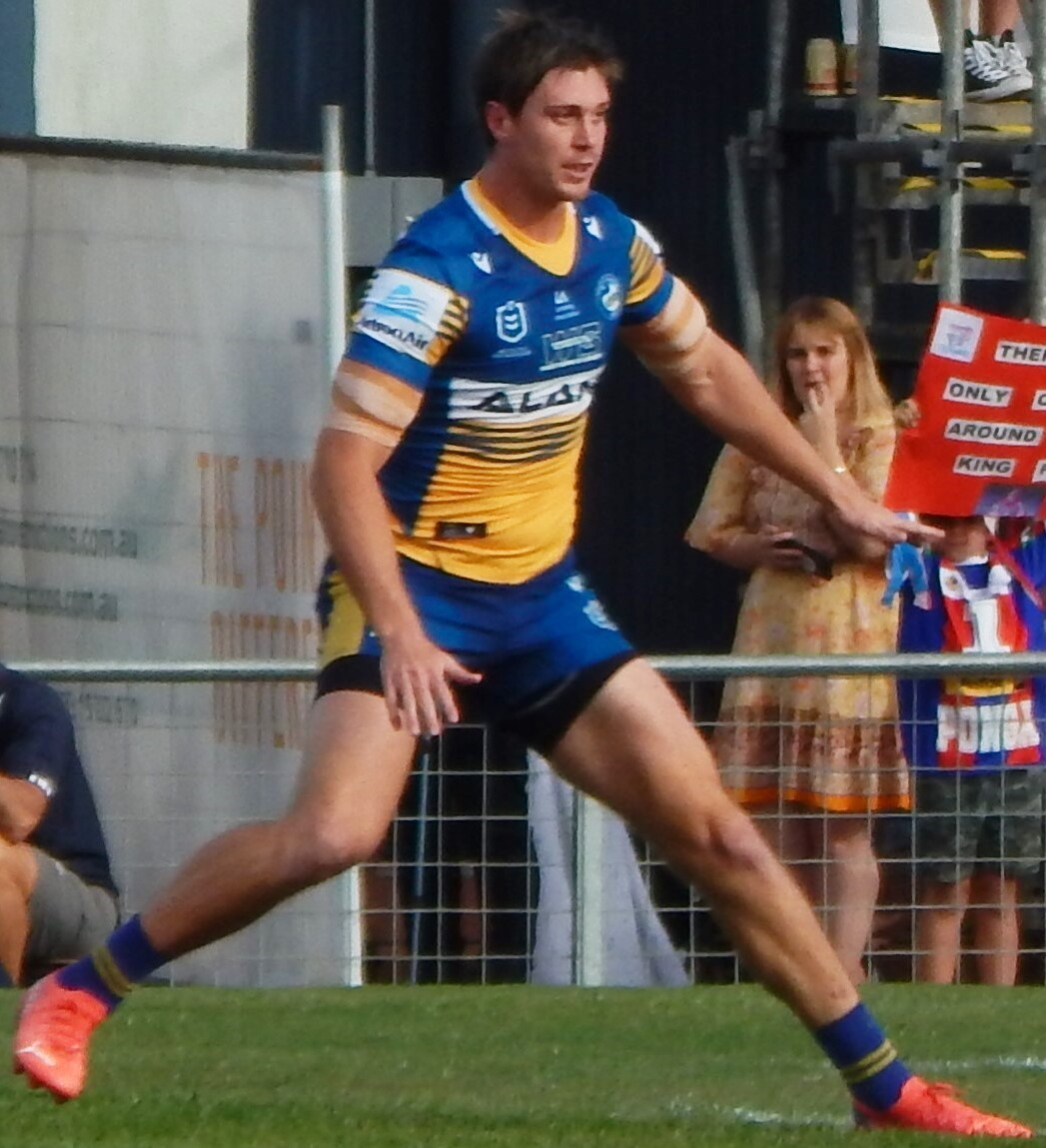

Personal information
- Full name: Shaun Lane
- Born: 29 November 1994 (age 31) Sydney, New South Wales, Australia
- Height: 198 cm (6 ft 6 in)
- Weight: 110 kg (17 st 5 lb)

Playing information
- Position: Second-row
Club
Years	Team	Pld	T	G	FG	P
2015	Canterbury Bulldogs	14	5	0	0	20
2016	New Zealand Warriors	1	0	0	0	0
2017–18	Manly Sea Eagles	33	10	0	0	40
2019–25	Parramatta Eels	138	21	0	0	84
	Total	186	36	0	0	144
Representative
Years	Team	Pld	T	G	FG	P
2016	NSW Residents	1	0	0	0	0
- Source: As of 12 April 2025
- Relatives: Brett Lane (brother)

Shaun Lane (born 29 November 1994) is an Australian former professional rugby league footballer who last played as a second-row forward for the Parramatta Eels in the National Rugby League.

He previously played for the Canterbury-Bankstown Bulldogs, New Zealand Warriors and the Manly Warringah Sea Eagles in the NRL.

== Background ==
Lane was born in Sydney, New South Wales, Australia. He is the younger brother of former Bulldogs player Brett Lane.

Lane played his junior rugby league for the South Eastern Seagulls, before being signed by the Canterbury-Bankstown Bulldogs.

== Playing career ==
=== Early career ===
In 2013 and 2014 Lane played for the Canterbury-Bankstown Bulldogs' NYC team.

=== 2015 ===
In 2015 Lane graduated to the Bulldogs' New South Wales Cup team. In Round 14, he made his NRL debut for Canterbury against the Gold Coast Titans. On 27 September, he was named on the interchange bench in the 2015 New South Wales Cup Team of the Year. He was named the club's rookie of the year, winning the Steve Mortimer Medal.

=== 2016 ===
On 5 April Lane was released by Canterbury in exchange for Raymond Faitala-Mariner.

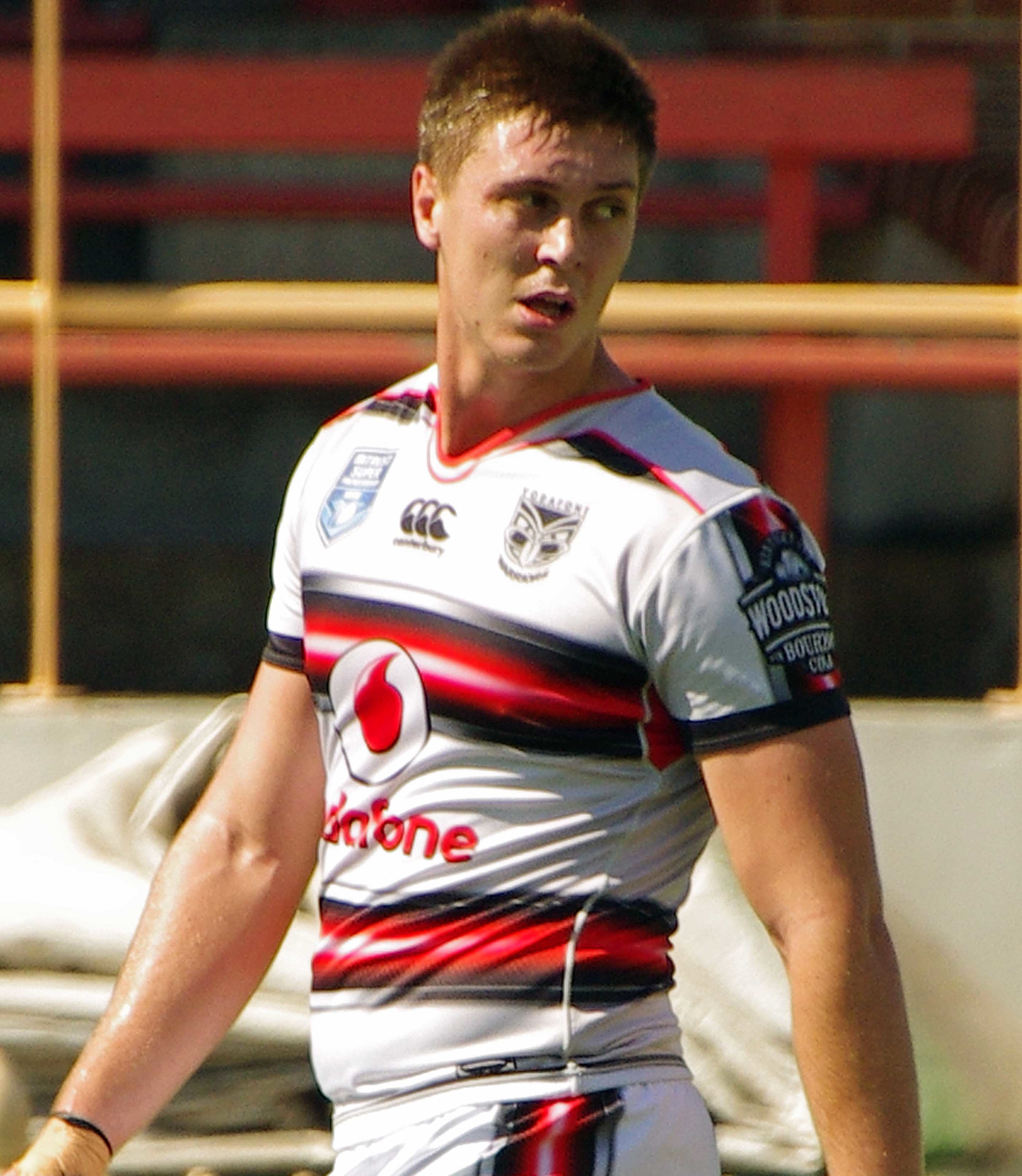
Lane playing for the Warriors in 2016

He signed a one-year deal with the New Zealand Warriors. He made his sole appearance for the Warriors in round 9 against the St. George Illawarra Dragons. In August, he signed a 2-year contract with the Manly Warringah Sea Eagles starting in 2017.

=== 2018 ===
Lane had a good year for the Sea Eagles, finishing the year as their top try scorer. In the middle of the season, he signed with the Parramatta Eels.

=== 2019 ===
Lane made his debut for Parramatta in Round 1 against Penrith which ended in a 20–12 victory. The following week, Lane scored his first try for the club in Parramatta's 36–16 victory over Canterbury. In Round 6, Lane scored his second try for the club as Parramatta defeated Wests Tigers 51–6 in the opening match at the new Western Sydney Stadium.

At the end of the 2019 regular season, Parramatta finished in 5th place on the table and qualified for the finals. In the elimination final against Brisbane, Lane scored a try as Parramatta won the match 58–0 at the new Western Sydney Stadium. The victory was the biggest finals win in history, eclipsing Newtown's 55–7 win over St George in 1944. The match was also Parramatta's biggest win over Brisbane and Brisbane's worst ever loss since entering the competition in 1988.

=== 2020 ===
On 3 March Lane signed a new three-year deal worth $1.3 million to see him stay at Parramatta until the end of the 2023 season.

=== 2021 ===
Lane played almost every match for Parramatta in the 2021 NRL season including both finals matches. Parramatta were eliminated from the semi-final stage of the competition by Penrith in a tough 8–6 defeat.

==== Drug prank ====
On 12 August 2019 it was revealed that Lane was under investigation by the NRL integrity unit after photos were shown Lane holding a plastic bag with a white substance inside. The photos were alleged to have been taken during Manly's 2018 mad monday celebrations.

On 19 August 2019 Lane spoke to the media saying that he felt like an idiot after the photos of him with a plastic bag containing a white substance were leaked. Lane said that it was a prank gone wrong and explained further by saying "I have made the game look very bad and brought it into disrepute, so on that basis, I was accepting of my punishment". Lane was fined $17,500 over the incident.

=== 2022 ===
Lane played 26 games for Parramatta in the 2022 NRL season including their Grand Final loss to Penrith. On 5 October 2022 Lane was awarded with the Ken Thornett Medal as Parramatta's player of the year. On 7 October Lane signed a three-year contract extension to remain at Parramatta until the end of 2026.

=== 2023 ===
On 20 February it was announced that Lane would be ruled out for an indefinite period after suffering a fractured jaw in Parramatta's trial victory over Newcastle. In round 6 of the 2023 NRL season Lane made his return to the Parramatta side in their 28–22 victory over the bottom placed Wests Tigers. In round 8 Lane played his 150th first grade game in Parramatta's 26–16 loss against Brisbane at TIO Stadium in Darwin. During Parramatta's round 11 loss to Canberra, Lane was taken from the field with a leg injury. It was later announced that Lane would be ruled out for 6–8 weeks with a torn hamstring. On 25 July Lane was ruled out for the remainder of the 2023 NRL season after he suffered a dislocated elbow during Parramatta's loss against North Queensland.

=== 2024 ===
Lane played 24 matches for Parramatta in the 2024 NRL season as the club finished 15th on the table.

=== 2025 ===
On 18 April, Lane was granted leave from the Parramatta club to consider his future in the sport.

On 14 August, Lane announced his retirement from NRL. Lane would take up a position within Parramatta's NRLW team and working in the elite pathways team. Lane revealed that he had become burnt out from the sport.

== Statistics ==
Year	Team	Games	Tries	Pts
2015	Canterbury-Bankstown Bulldogs	14	5	20
2016	New Zealand Warriors	1		
2017	Manly Warringah Sea Eagles	9	1	4
2018	Manly Warringah Sea Eagles	24	9	36
2019	Parramatta Eels	25	5	20
2020	Parramatta Eels	22	3	12
2021	Parramatta Eels	26	5	20
2022	Parramatta Eels	26	2	8
2023	Parramatta Eels	10	1	4
2024	Parramatta Eels	24	4	16
2025	Parramatta Eels	5	1	4
	Totals	186	36	144
