= Brett Lane =

Australian rugby league footballer

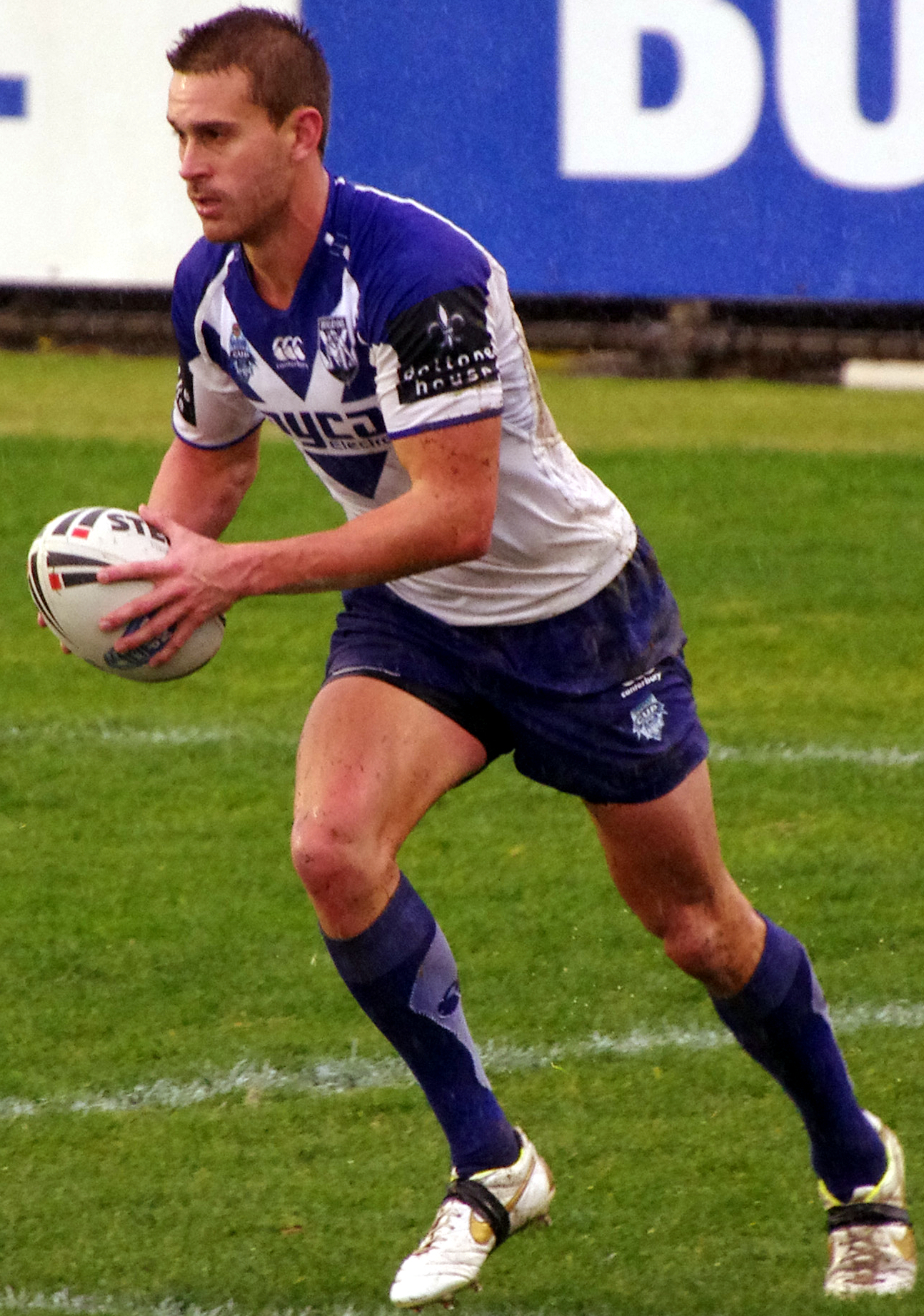

Personal information
- Born: 30 July 1988 (age 37) Canterbury, New South Wales, Australia

Playing information
- Height: 188 cm (6 ft 2 in)
- Weight: 96 kg (15 st 2 lb)
- Position: Wing, Centre
Club
Years	Team	Pld	T	G	FG	P
2012	Canterbury Bulldogs	1	0	0	0	0
- Relatives: Shaun Lane (brother)

Brett Lane (born 30 July 1988) is an Australian former rugby league footballer who played one National Rugby League match for the Canterbury-Bankstown Bulldogs.

He also played with the Wests Tigers Toyota Cup team in 2008.

He played his single first grade match in round 15 of the 2012 NRL season against the St. George Illawarra Dragons.

Lane is the older brother of Shaun Lane.
