= Luciano Leilua =

Samoa international rugby league footballer

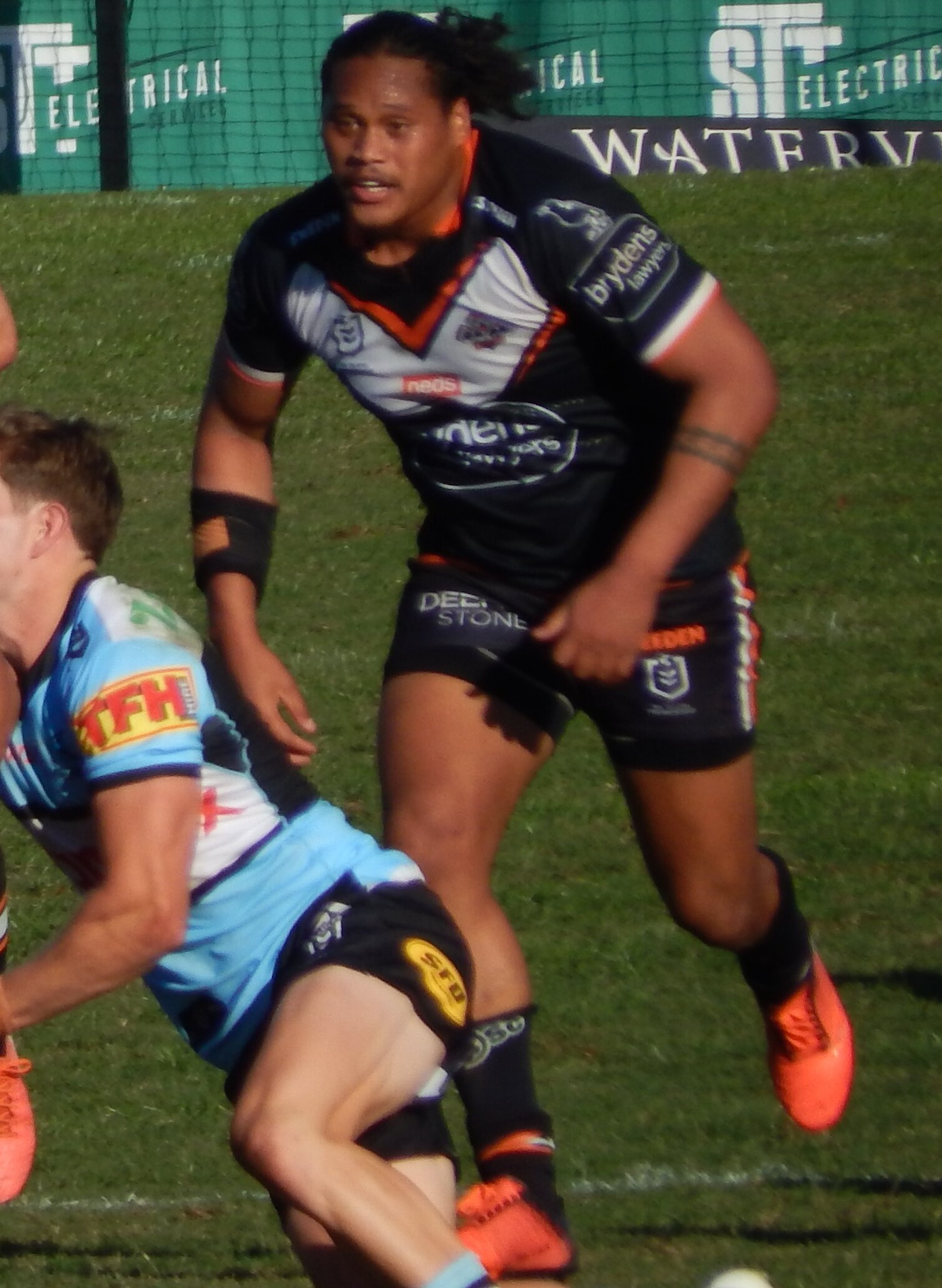

Personal information
- Full name: Luciano Leilua Kelemete
- Born: 8 June 1996 (age 30) Camperdown, New South Wales, Australia
- Height: 188 cm (6 ft 2 in)
- Weight: 113 kg (17 st 11 lb)

Playing information
- Position: Second-row
Club
Years	Team	Pld	T	G	FG	P
2016–19	St. George Illawarra	43	8	0	0	32
2020–22	Wests Tigers	56	13	0	0	52
2022–23	Nth Qld Cowboys	24	5	0	0	20
2024–26	St. George Illawarra	55	5	0	0	20
2027–	Catalans Dragons	0	0	0	0	0
	Total	178	31	0	0	124
Representative
Years	Team	Pld	T	G	FG	P
2019	Samoa 9s	4	0	0	0	0
2019–24	Samoa	5	1	0	0	4
- Source: As of 22 November 2026
- Education: Endeavour Sports High School
- Relatives: Joseph Leilua (brother)

Luciano Leilua (born 8 June 1996) is a Samoa international rugby league footballer who plays as a second-row forward for the Catalans Dragons in the Super League.

He previously played for the North Queensland Cowboys and Wests Tigers in the NRL.

== Background ==
Leilua was born in Camperdown, New South Wales, Australia, and is of Samoan descent. He is the younger brother of former NRL player Joseph Leilua.

Leilua played his junior rugby league for Hurstville United, before being signed by the St. George Illawarra Dragons.

== Playing career ==
=== Early career ===
From 2014 to 2016, Leilua played for the St. George Illawarra Dragons' NYC team. On 25 July 2014, he re-signed with St. George Illawarra on a two-year contract until the end of 2016. In November and December 2014, he played for the Australian Schoolboys.

=== 2016 ===
In round 22 of the 2016 NRL season, Leilua made his NRL debut for St. George Illawarra against the Brisbane Broncos. In September, he was named at second-row in the 2016 NYC Team of the Year.

=== 2018 ===
Leilua made 16 appearances for St. George in the 2018 NRL season as the club reached the finals after finishing 7th on the table. In week one, Leilua scored a try as St. George defeated Brisbane 48-18 in an upset victory at Suncorp Stadium. The following week, Leilua played in St. George's 13-12 elimination final loss against South Sydney.

=== 2019 ===
Leilua made a total of 22 appearances for St. George in the 2019 NRL season as the club endured one of their worst ever seasons finishing in 15th place on the table. On 30 November, Leilua signed a three-year deal to join the Wests Tigers.

=== 2020 ===
Leilua made his debut for Wests Tigers against St. George Illawarra in round 1 of the 2020 NRL season at WIN Stadium. Wests Tigers went on to win the match 24-14 with Leilua scoring a second half try. He scored his first double in round 10 in the club's 48-0 win over the Brisbane Broncos.

One of three Tigers players to appear in all 20 of their games, his 7 tries were the third most for the club and the most of any Wests forward, and equal best amongst forwards in the NRL. He attributed his run of performances to the 5 kilos he dropped in the pre-season, saying, "I've just got to take that into the pre-season and make sure I stay in shape … don't gain any daddy weight. Besides not making the finals I feel I've had a pretty good year. Madge has played a big part in my footy this year. He's given me a lot of confidence and belief."

=== 2021 ===
Leilua played a total of 24 matches for the Wests Tigers in the 2021 NRL season as the club finished 13th and missed the finals.

On 24 November, Leilua signed a three-year contract worth $2.2 million to join North Queensland starting in 2023. On the same day as the announcement, Leilua requested an immediate release from Wests Tigers.

=== 2022 ===
On 14 June, Leilua was granted an early release from his Wests Tigers contract to join the North Queensland side. He said, "I was disappointed when they let go of Madge but me being close to Madge, they wanted to flick me. I did take it hard, it was a bit disappointing. I guess the board and those guys up there wanted me out. I don't know why." Leilua played 11 games for North Queensland after his switch from the Wests Tigers including the clubs upset loss to Parramatta in the preliminary final at Queensland Country Bank Stadium.

On 3 October, Leilua was arrested by NSW Police and charged with two counts of assault. NSW police confirmed they were called to a home around 1pm, officers attended and were told Leilua allegedly assaulted a woman known to him and smashed the woman's phone. The North Queensland club later released a statement which read, "The club is gathering further information and assisting the NRL Integrity Unit as well as providing support to all parties involved, further comment will be made in due course."

In October Leilua was named in the Samoa squad for the 2021 Rugby League World Cup.

=== 2023 ===
On 18 May, domestic violence charges against Leilua were dropped by police. Leilua played 13 games for North Queensland in the 2023 NRL season as the club finished 11th on the table.

=== 2024 ===
Leilua in 2026

On 7 February, it was revealed that Leilua had been suspended from driving and handed a $300 fine in relation to being stopped by Queensland police in January 2024. It was reported that Leilua registered a blood alcohol concentration of 0.052 at the time and charged him with low-range drink driving. The North Queensland club released a statement which read "The Cowboys will continue to work with the NRL Integrity Unit on the matter and will make further comment once those discussions are complete". On 21 February, Leilua signed a three-year deal with St. George Illawarra after being granted an immediate release from his North Queensland contract. The deal was reportedly worth $900,000 a season making Leilua one of the club's highest paid players. In round 14, Leilua scored two tries for St. George Illawarra in their 56-14 victory over the Wests Tigers.

=== 2025 ===
Leilua played 23 games for St. George Illawarra in the 2025 NRL season as the club finished a disappointing 15th on the table.

=== 2026 ===
On 19 August, the Catalans Dragons announced that Leilua had signed a three-year deal with the team beginning in 2027. He played 15 matches for St. George Illawarra in the 2026 NRL season as the club finished with the Wooden Spoon. It was the clubs first wooden spoon and the first any St. George affiliated side had received since 1938.

== Statistics ==
Year	Team	Games	Tries	Pts
2016	St. George Illawarra Dragons	5		
2018	St. George Illawarra Dragons	16	5	20
2019	St. George Illawarra Dragons	22	3	12
2020	Wests Tigers	20	7	28
2021	Wests Tigers	24	5	20
2022	Wests Tigers	12	1	4
2022	North Queensland Cowboys	11	3	12
2023	North Queensland Cowboys	13	2	8
2024	St. George Illawarra Dragons	18	3	12
2025	St. George Illawarra Dragons	23		
2026	St. George Illawarra Dragons	14	2	8
2027	Catalans Dragons			
	Totals	178	31	124
