= Western Sydney Stadium =

Stadium in Parramatta, Australia

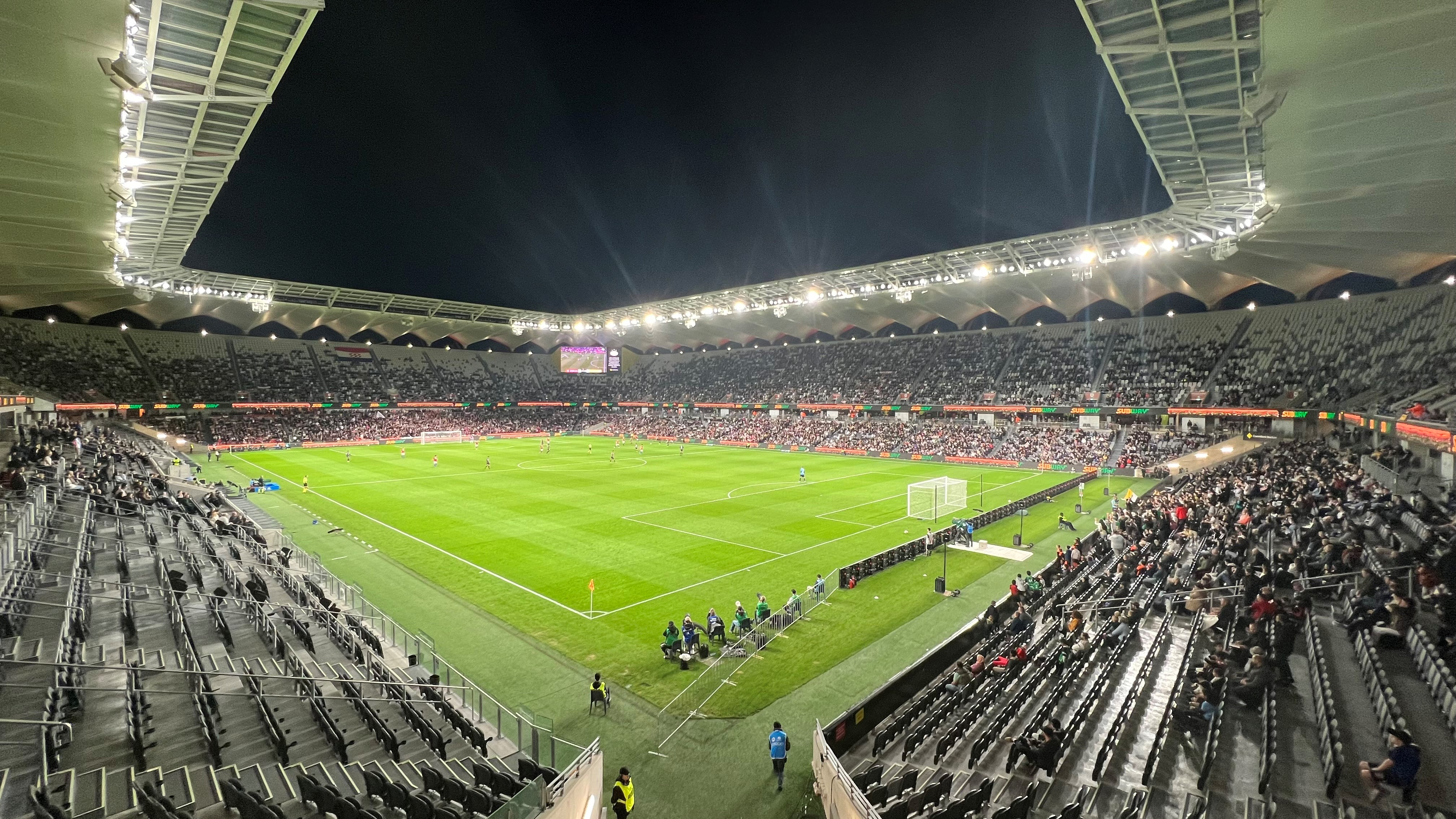
- Interior view
- Interactive map of Western Sydney Stadium
- Former names: Bankwest Stadium (2019–2021)
- Address: 11-13 O'Connell St; Parramatta; Sydney; New South Wales 2150; Australia
- Coordinates: 33°48′29″S 150°59′59″E
- Owner: Venues NSW on behalf of NSW Government
- Operator: VenuesLive
- Capacity: 30,000
- Surface: Grass
- Record attendance: 29,411 (Tonga vs. Samoa; Rugby League World Cup; 1 November 2026)
- Field size: 140 × 80 metres
- Public transit: Prince Alfred Square

Construction
- Groundbreaking: 2016
- Opened: 14 April 2019
- Cost: $300 million
- Architect: Populous
- Main contractor: Lendlease

Tenants
- Rugby league Parramatta Eels (NRL) (2019–present); Wests Tigers (NRL) (2019–2023, 2025–); Penrith Panthers (NRL) (2025-present); Canterbury-Bankstown Bulldogs (NRL) (2019–2022); South Sydney Rabbitohs (NRL) (2020–2021) Rugby union New South Wales Waratahs (Super Rugby) (2019–2021) Association football Western Sydney Wanderers (A-League) (2019–present)

Website
- commbankstadium.com.au

Western Sydney Stadium (known under naming rights as CommBank Stadium) is a stadium in the Sydney suburb of Parramatta. It is primarily used for rugby league and soccer as the home ground of the Parramatta Eels in the National Rugby League (NRL), as well as Western Sydney Wanderers FC in the A-League Men competition.

The stadium was opened in 2019 as a replacement for the now demolished Parramatta Stadium, located on the same site, which was also in turn the site of the former Cumberland Oval, home of the Parramatta Eels since 1947. It was constructed at a cost of $300 million, and hosts a capacity of 30,000. It is owned by the NSW Government and is managed by Venues NSW. In 2021 Commonwealth Bank secured naming rights sponsorship of the stadium.

The stadium is temporarily being used as the home ground of the Penrith Panthers in the NRL due to Penrith Stadium’s redevelopment. It is also used as an alternate stadium for the Wests Tigers in the NRL. The stadium also occasionally hosts special events and concerts.

== Location history ==
The area on which the stadium is, was used for leisure and horse racing in the British colony at Parramatta, that was founded along with the harbour settlement of Sydney in 1788. Governor Charles FitzRoy approved the creation of a racecourse on the site in 1847, with a cricket field grown within the racetrack and opened in 1863. After numerous name changes the local cricket club settled on the name Central Cumberland Cricket Club, and from there the site gained the Cumberland Oval name.

Cumberland Oval was used variously for horse racing, cricket, athletics, rugby union, rugby league and motor sports. When in use for motor sports the site was named the Parramatta Speedway, holding events from 1930 through to 1959. When the Parramatta District Rugby League Club were admitted into the NSWRL Premiership in 1947, Cumberland Oval became the club's home ground. In 1981 after Parramatta won their first-ever rugby league premiership supporters packed into the oval and proceeded to burn the grandstand to the ground, and shortly after a decision was made to build a modern stadium.

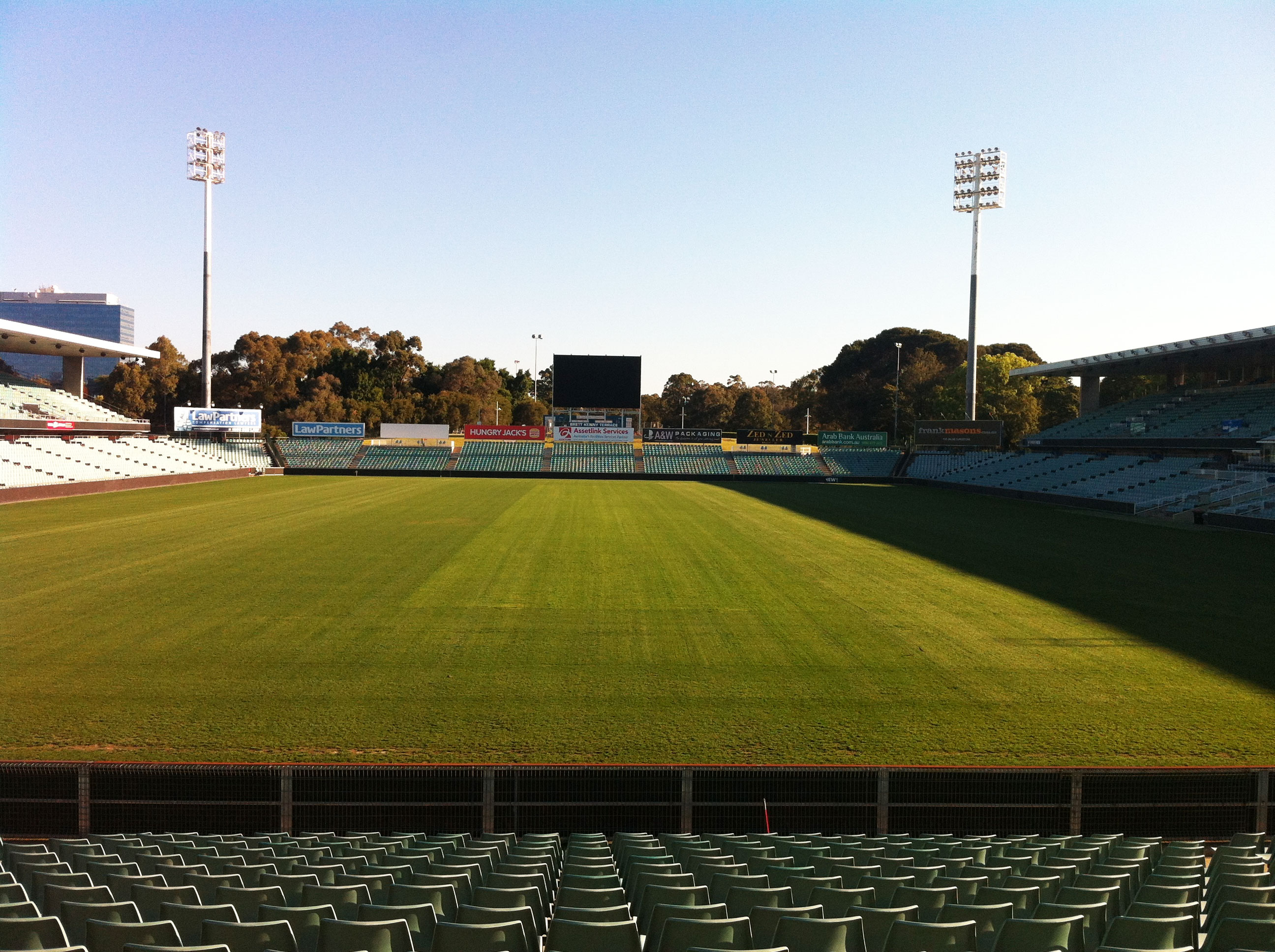
The former Parramatta Stadium in 2012

Parramatta Stadium was designed in 1984, built in 1985 and opened by Queen Elizabeth II on 5 March 1986. The new rectangular stadium continued to host local, state and national sports events as well as concerts. It was converted into an all-seater stadium in 2002, with a reduced capacity of 21,000. In 2012, with the success of the newly formed Western Sydney Wanderers, which included hosting a sell out crowd for the 2014 AFC Champions League Final, and the ongoing desire of the Parramatta Eels to replace the nearly 30-year-old stadium, the NSW Government canvassed expansion options including an increase to capacity in the north and south ends with a second tier or a successive rebuild of all four sides. A minor redevelopment of the main stand was completed in early 2015. In September 2015 the decision was made for a knock down rebuild of the entire stadium.

Parramatta Stadium's last A-League match was a semi-final between the Western Sydney Wanderers and Brisbane Roar where the Wanderers came from a 3–0 deficit to win the game 5–4 in extra time. The Parramatta Eels hosted the final game of rugby league, defeating St George Illawarra 30–18, with Bevan French scoring three tries.

Parramatta Memorial Swimming Club was also demolished to make way for the expanded stadium. It was replaced by the Parramatta Aquatic Centre, built on vacant Parramatta Park Trust space that hosted the 9-hole Parramatta Golf Course until the member funded club went into administration and closed in 2015.

== Rebuild and design decision ==
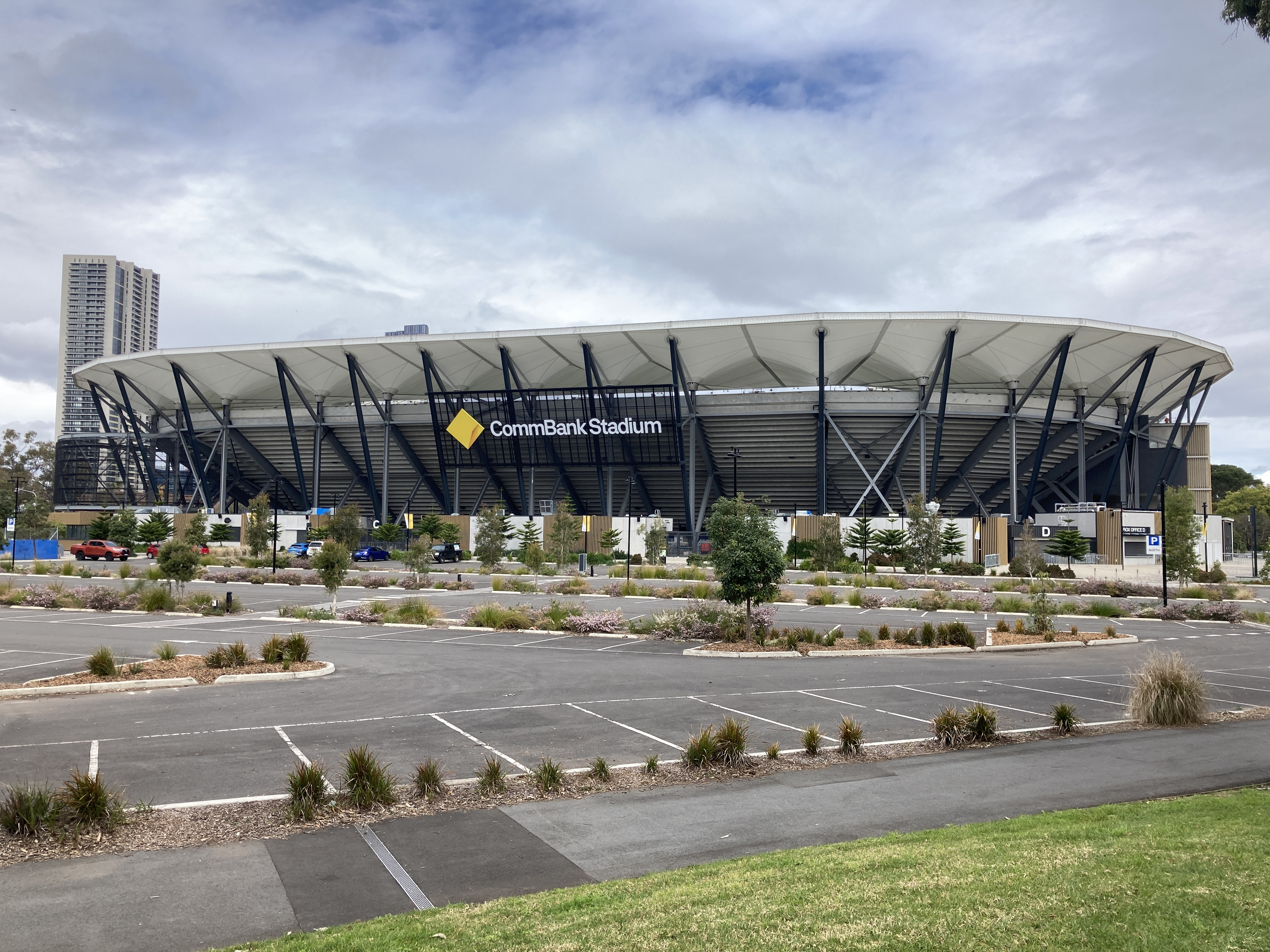
Exterior view

In September 2015, the New South Wales Government announced that the stadium would be replaced with a new 30,000-seat venue on the same site. Expressions of interest were requested in June 2016, with four shortlisted to bid: The four groups were Populous & Lendlease, Cox Architecture & John Holland, Hassell & Brookfield Multiplex and, lastly, BVN & Laing O'Rourke. The contract was awarded to the Populous and Lendlease consortium in December 2016, with Aurecon enlisted as engineering consultants.

As a requirement of the expanded footprint of the stadium, the adjacent Parramatta War Memorial Pool was also closed and demolished. A small group of protesters disagreed with the decision, gaining a measure of local media coverage to promote their anti-stadium online petitions. A replacement for the pool was announced in March 2017, with the NSW Government confirming that a new aquatic centre would be built on the old Parramatta Golf Course site.

== Stadium features ==
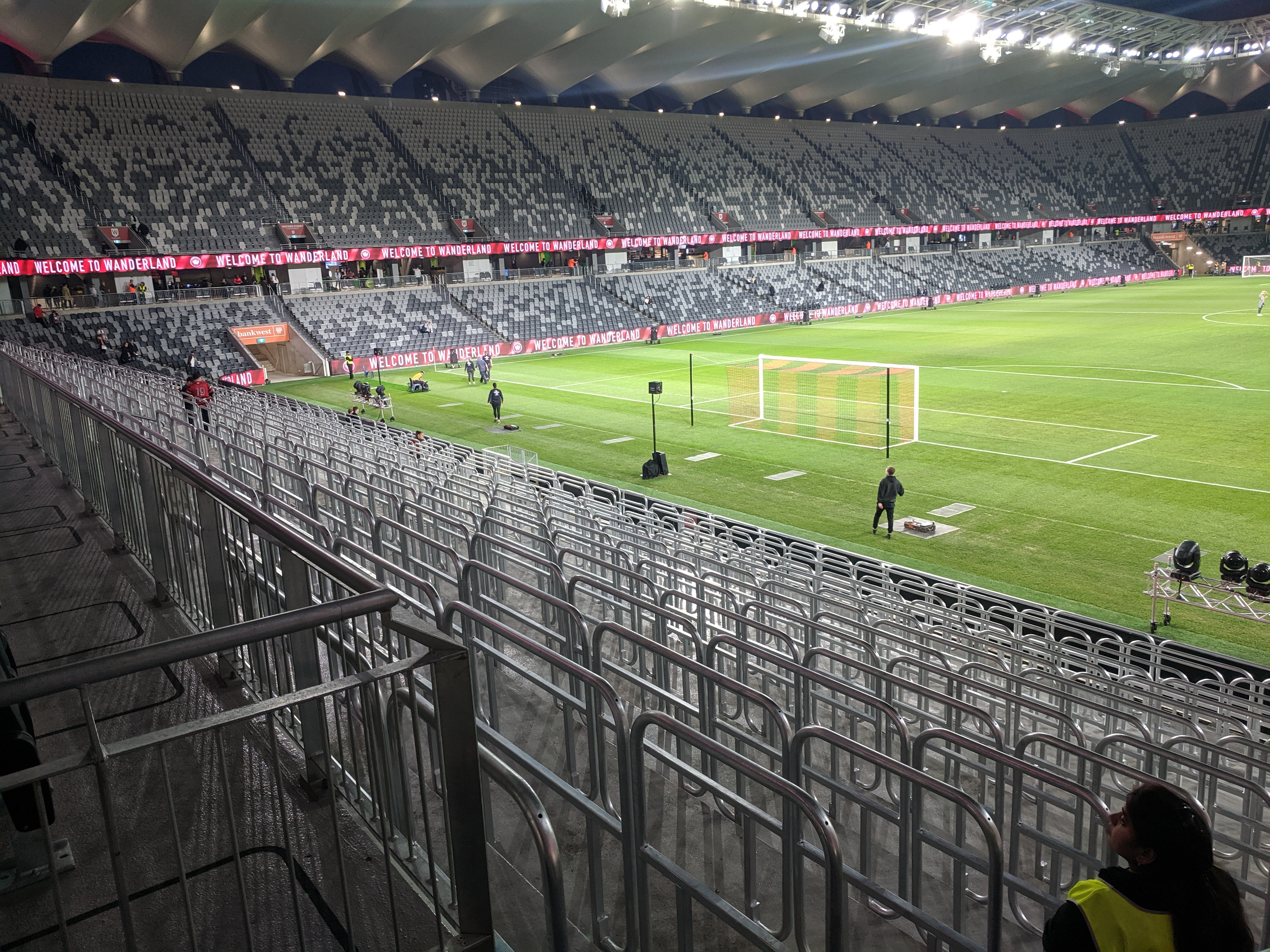
Safe standing area

The key features of the stadium are a 10,000 increase in capacity from the old stadium, a major increase in corporate facilities, steep grandstands, integrated pedestrian and transport links, local landscaping, a premium field-level members club and a high-quality public address system. The first major installation of modern safe standing in Australia is included in the design, with three bays totalling 1,000 capacity in the Red & Black Bloc active support area, using an interchange system that allows regular seating to be installed during the winter rugby code season before being swapped for the summer A-League season for the Wanderers. It is also designed to have a LEED Gold Energy rating.

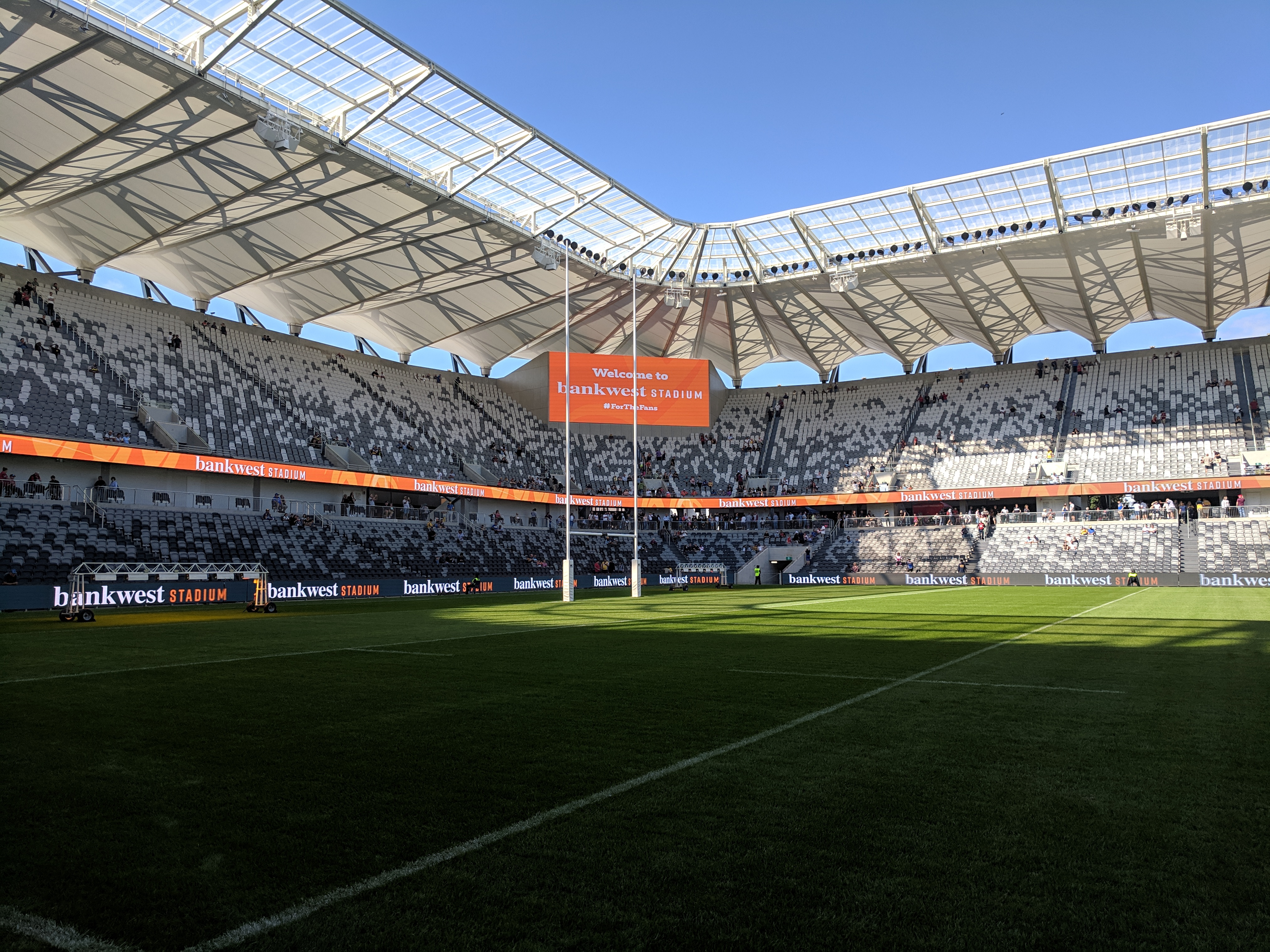
North terrace

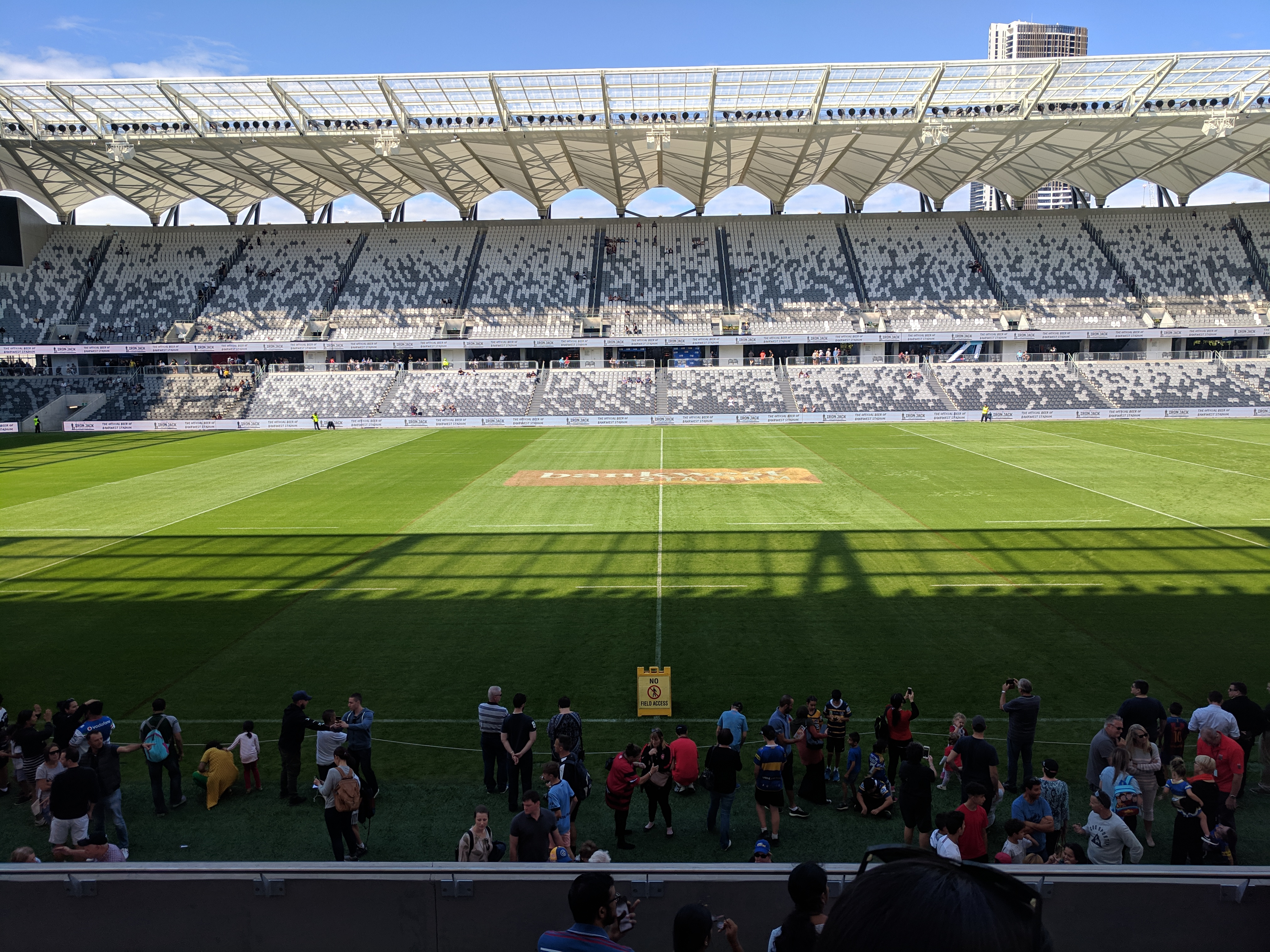
View from the main grandstand

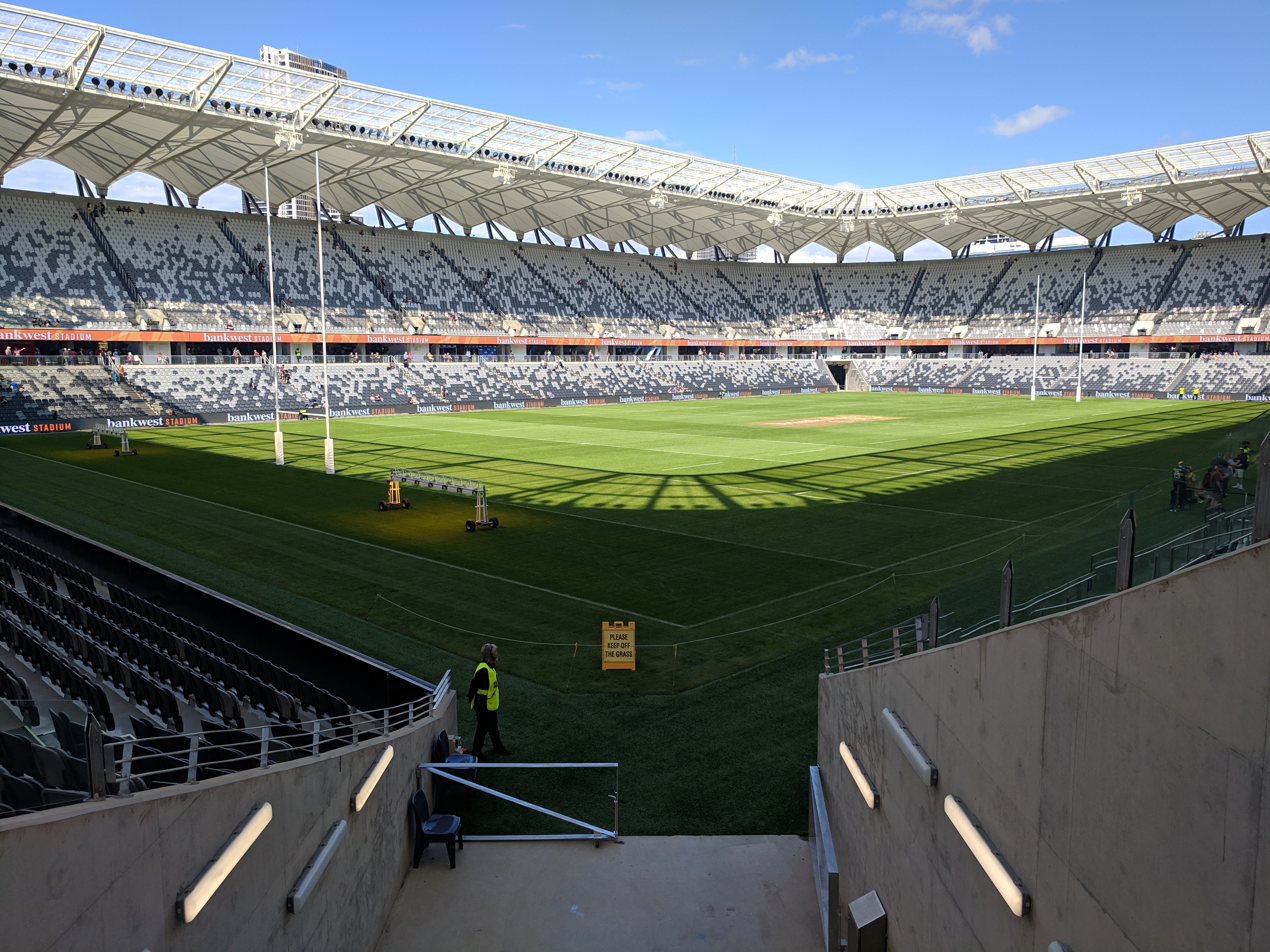
View from the north-west corner

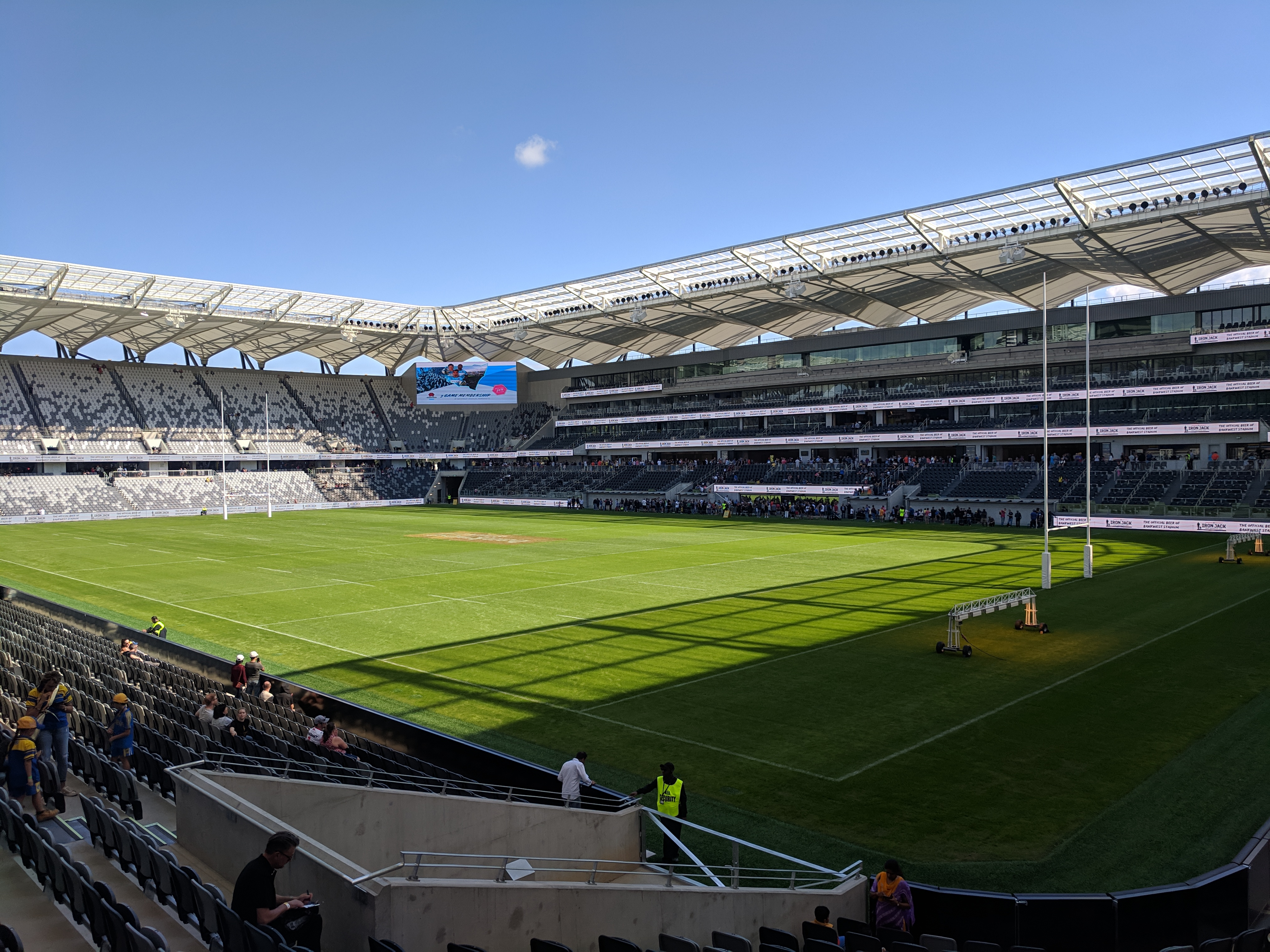
View from the north-east corner

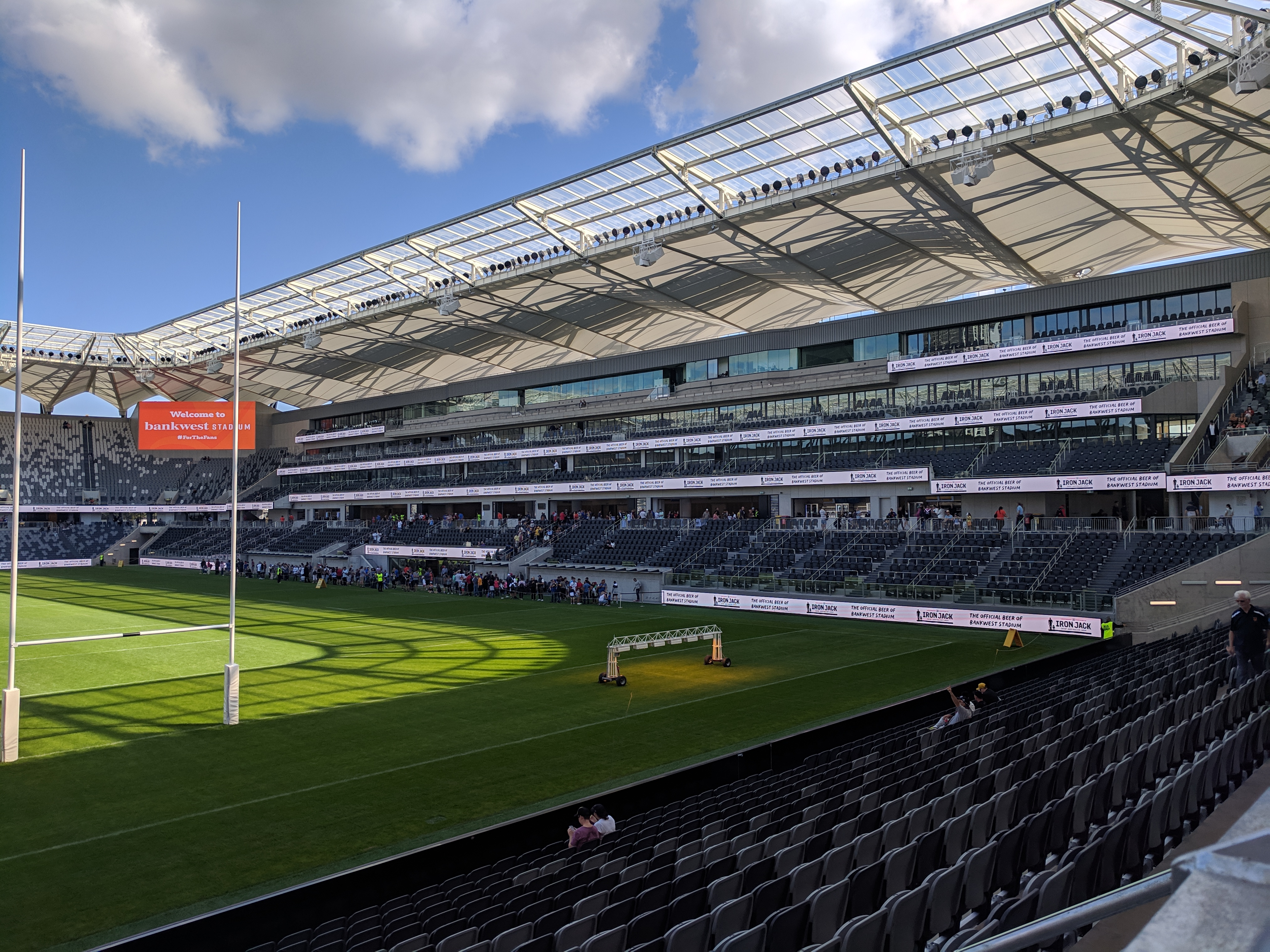
Main grandstand

== Construction ==
Demolition work on the old ground began in early 2017 and was completed in February 2017. Site cleanup, excavation and preparatory ground work finished in August. Construction started with concrete foundations being laid down in September 2017, with the main stand complete by mid-2018. The first roof section was assembled and lifted into place at the south end of the ground on 12 February 2018, and complete by late 2018. The structure as a whole was complete in early 2019, with the final internal and landscaping work being completed prior to the opening. The stadium officially opened on 14 April 2019.

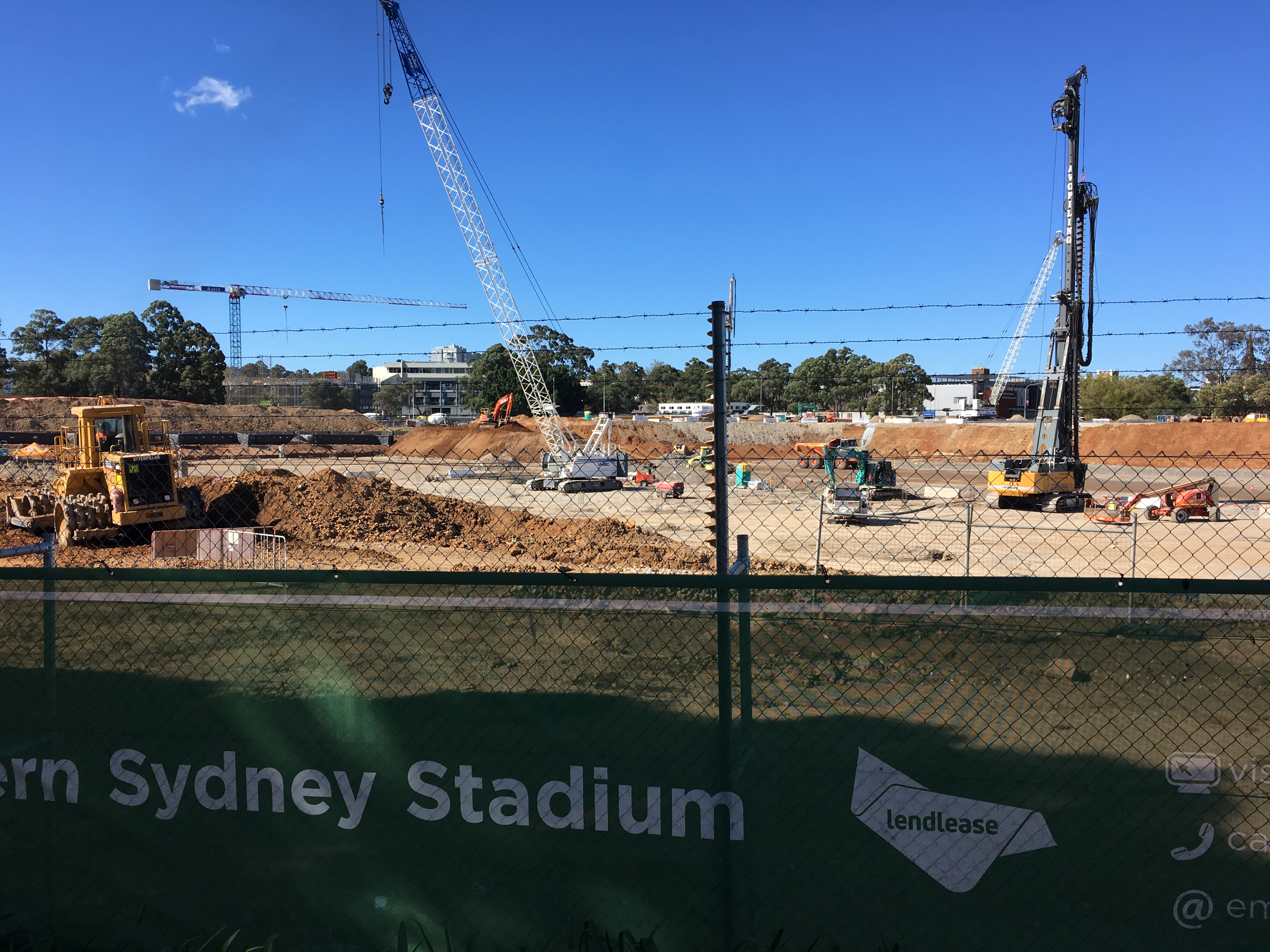
September 2017

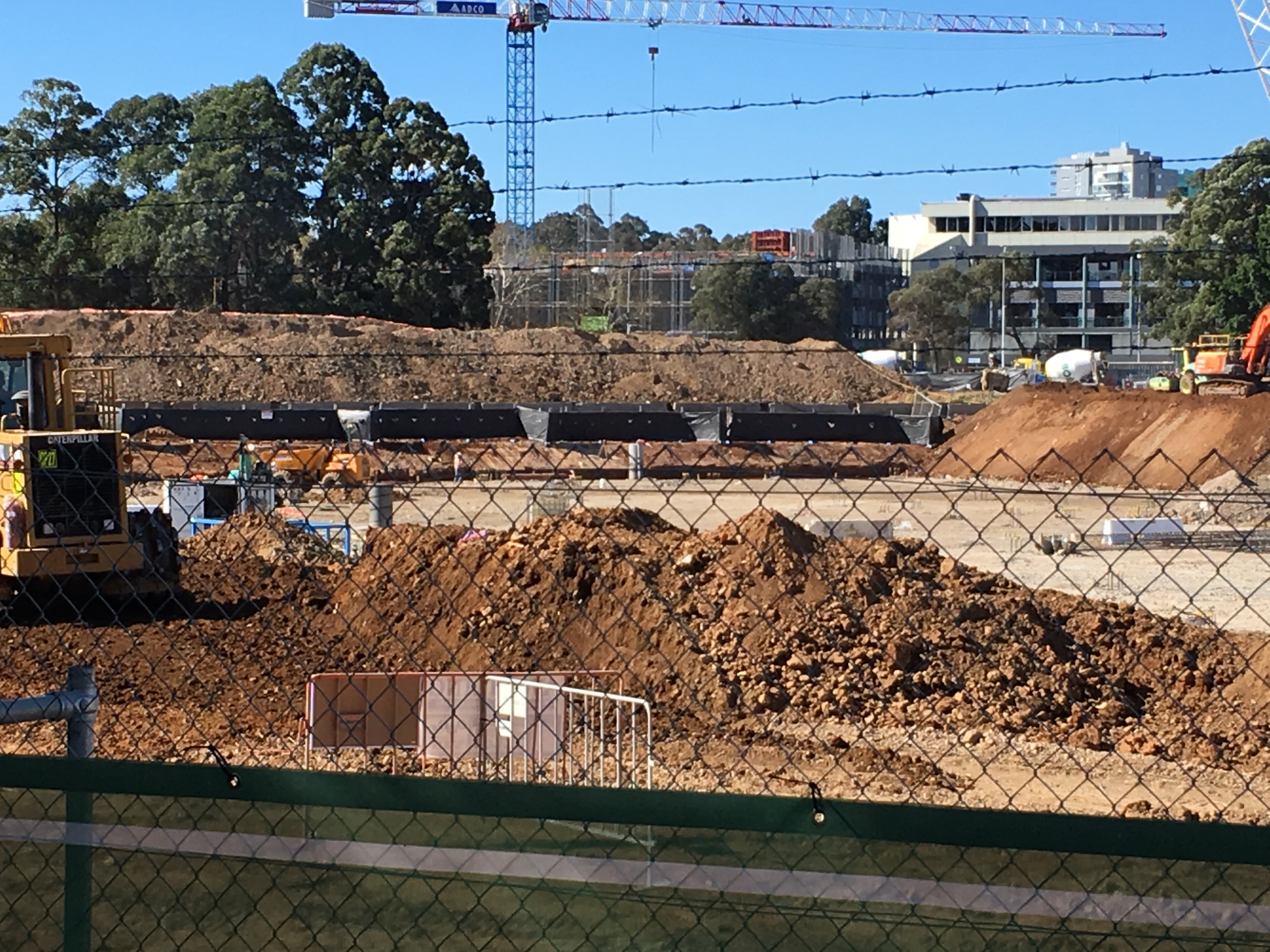
September 2017

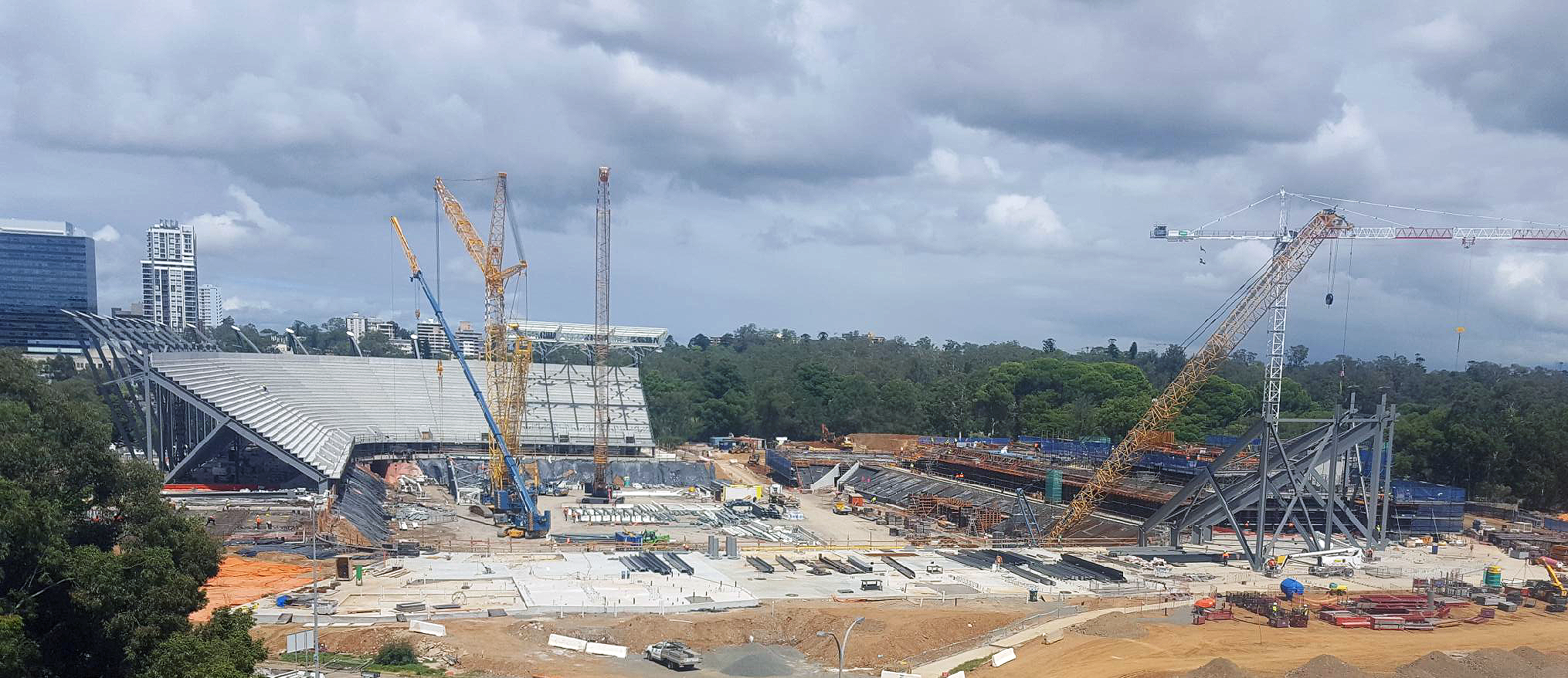
March 2018

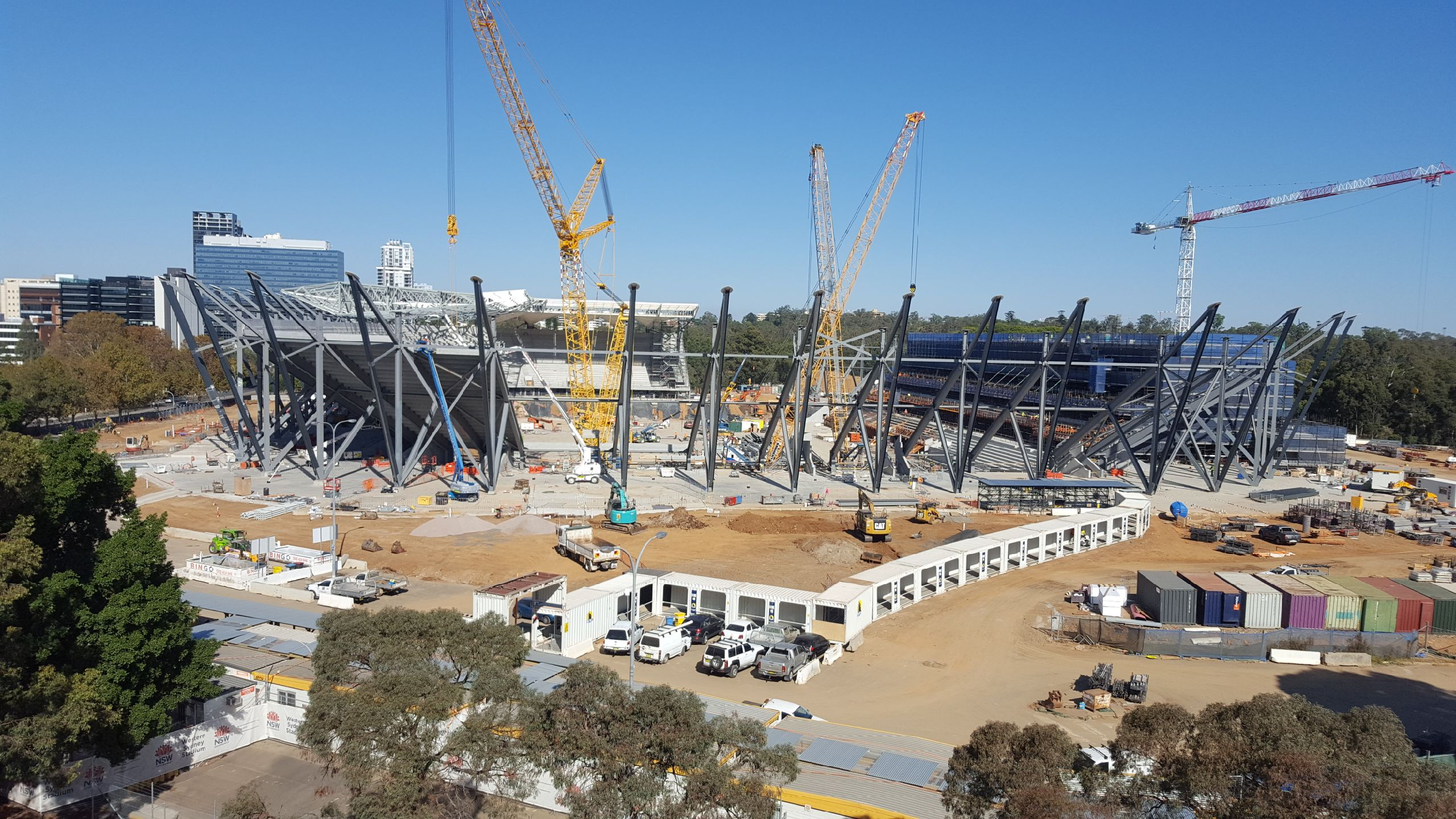
May 2018 overview

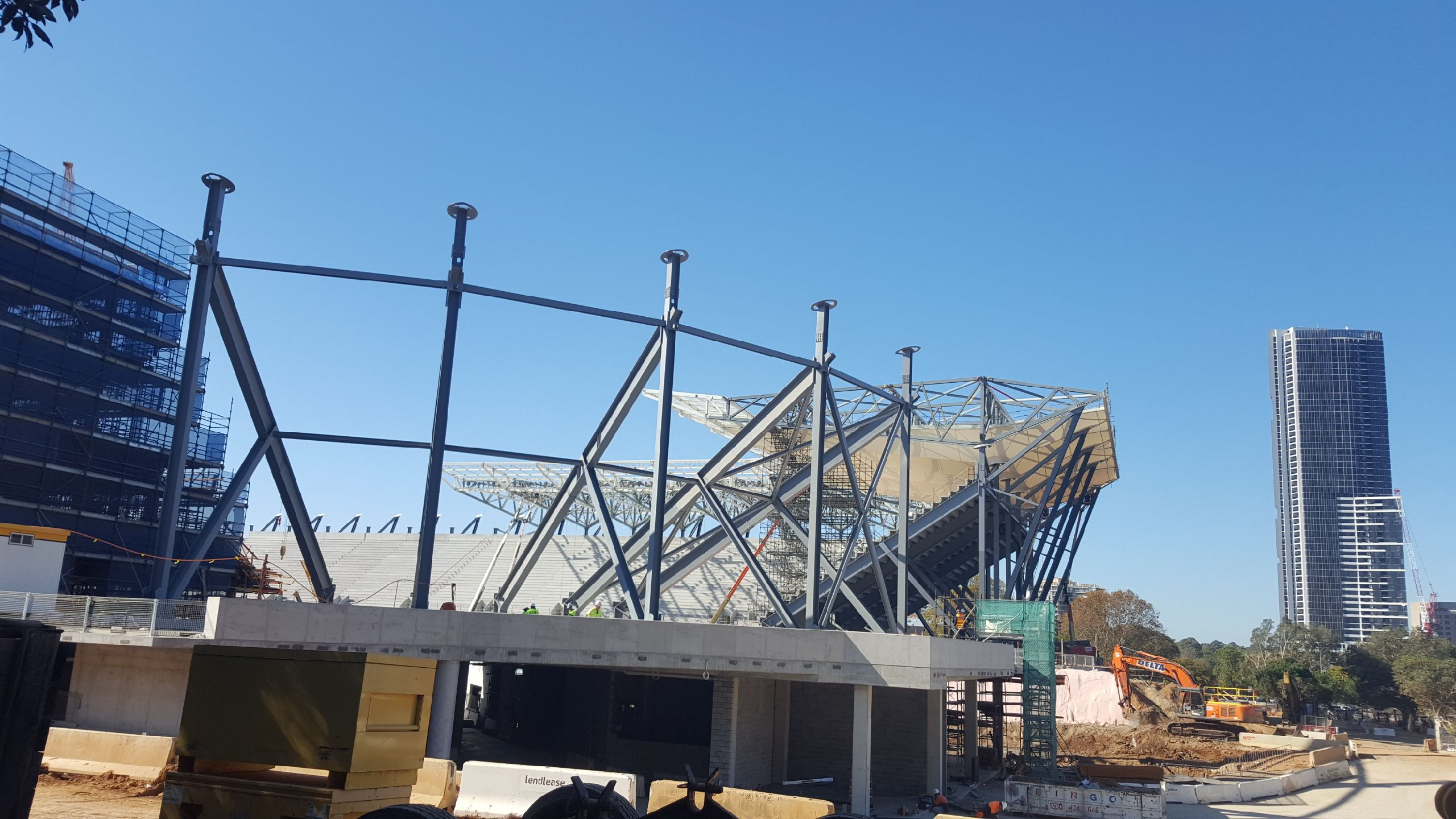
May 2018 south-west corner

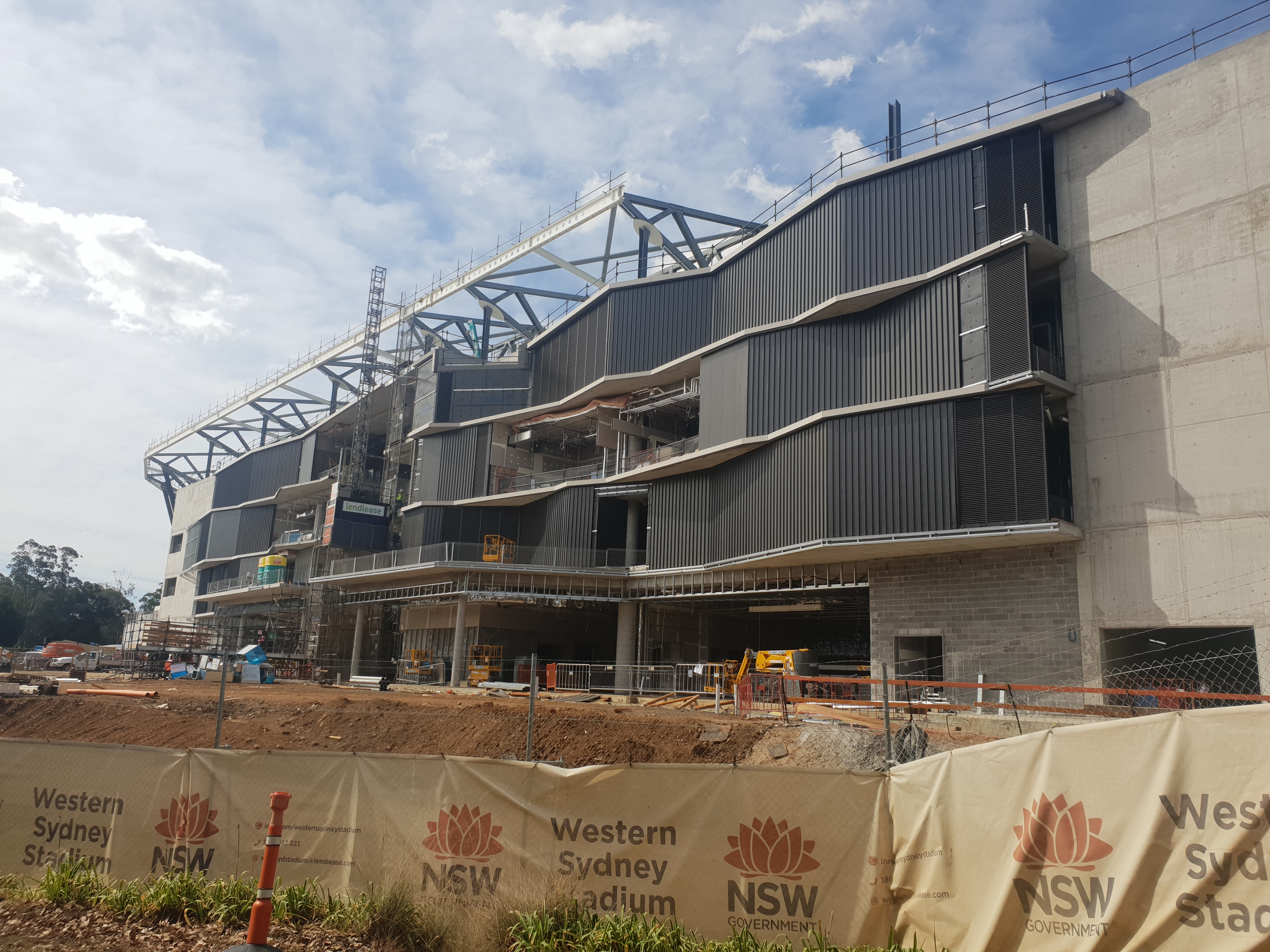
September 2018 Main Grandstand rear view

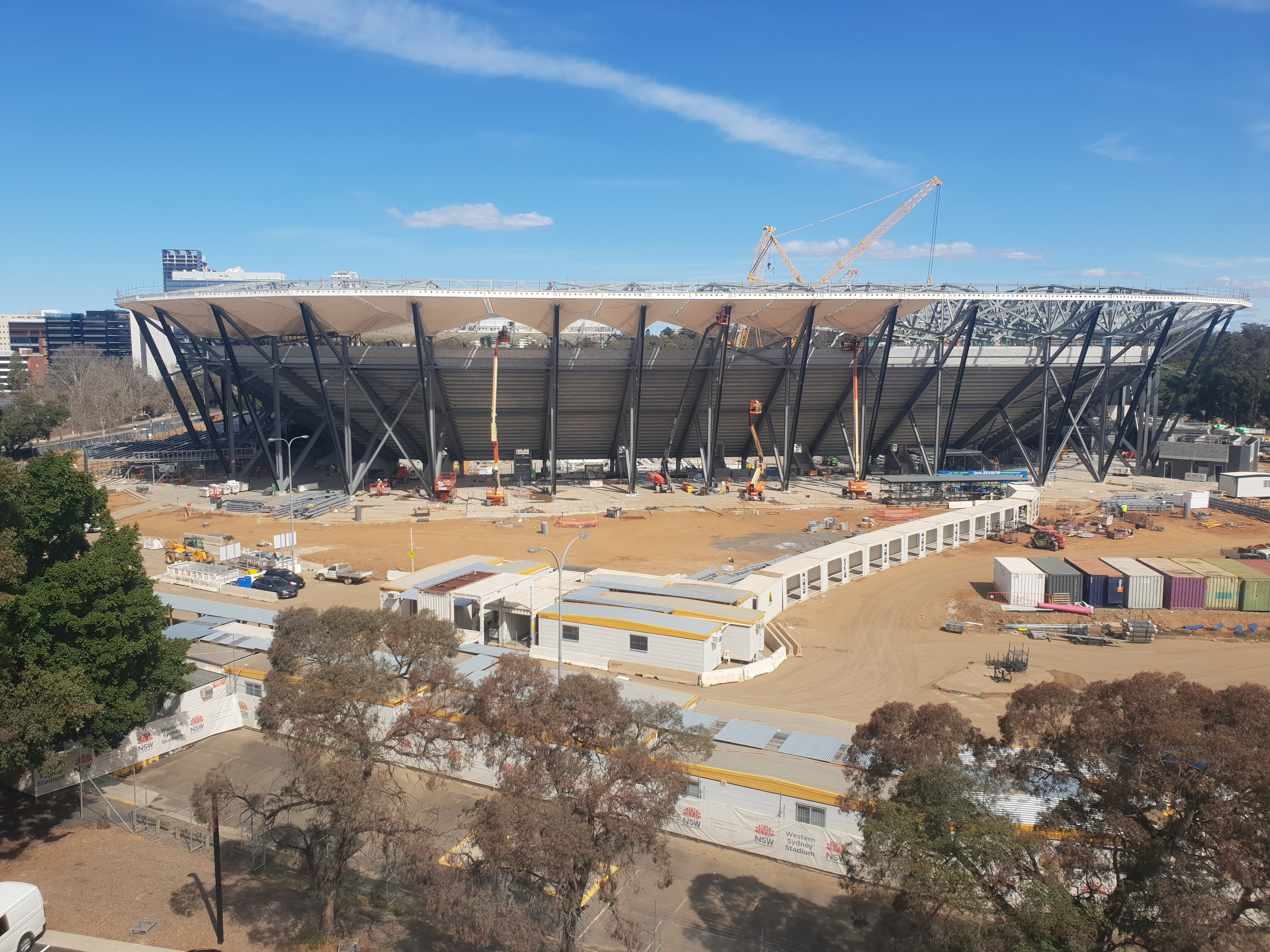
September 2018 North Terrace construction

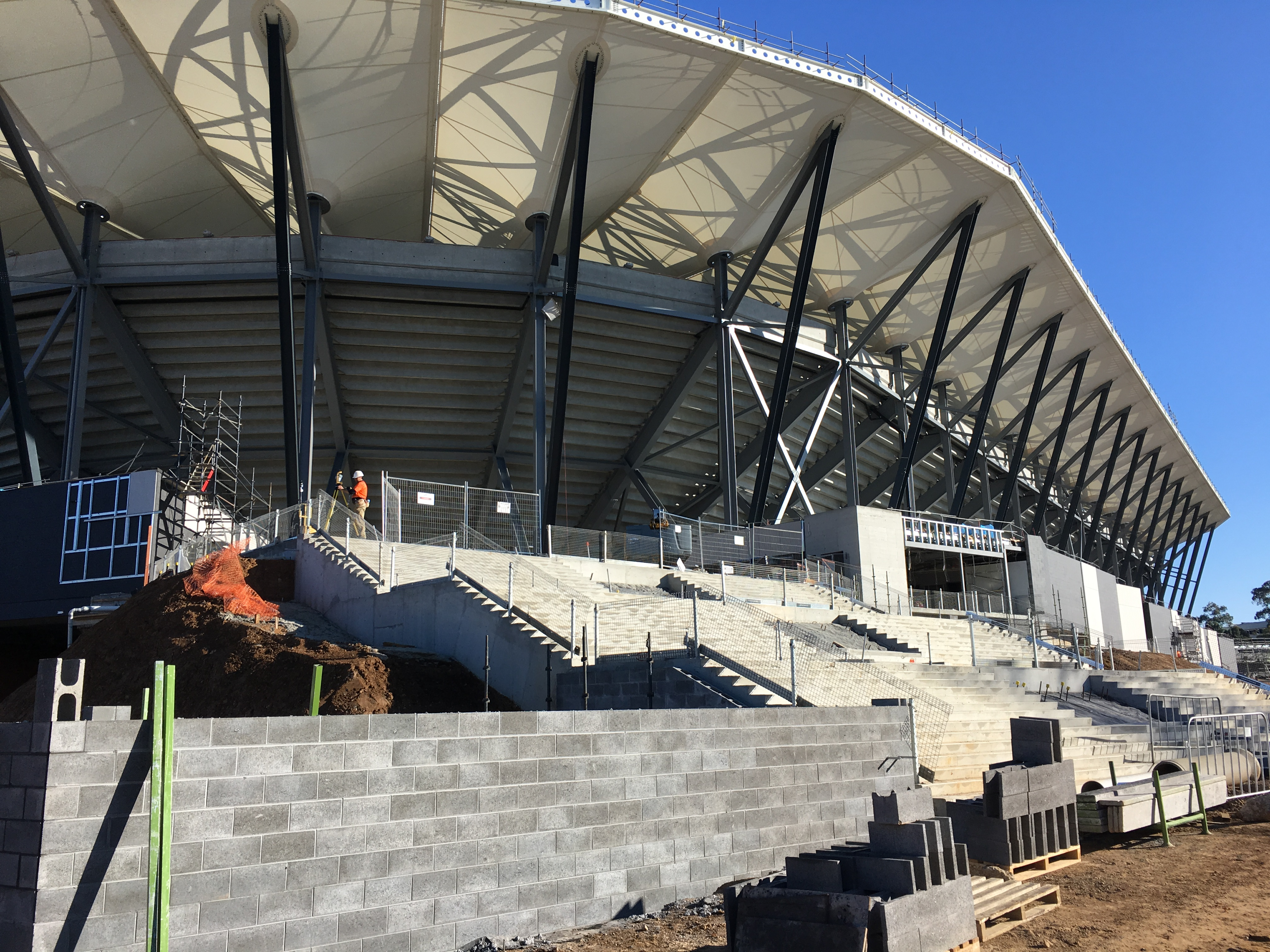
September 2018 O'Connell Street entrance construction

== Uses ==
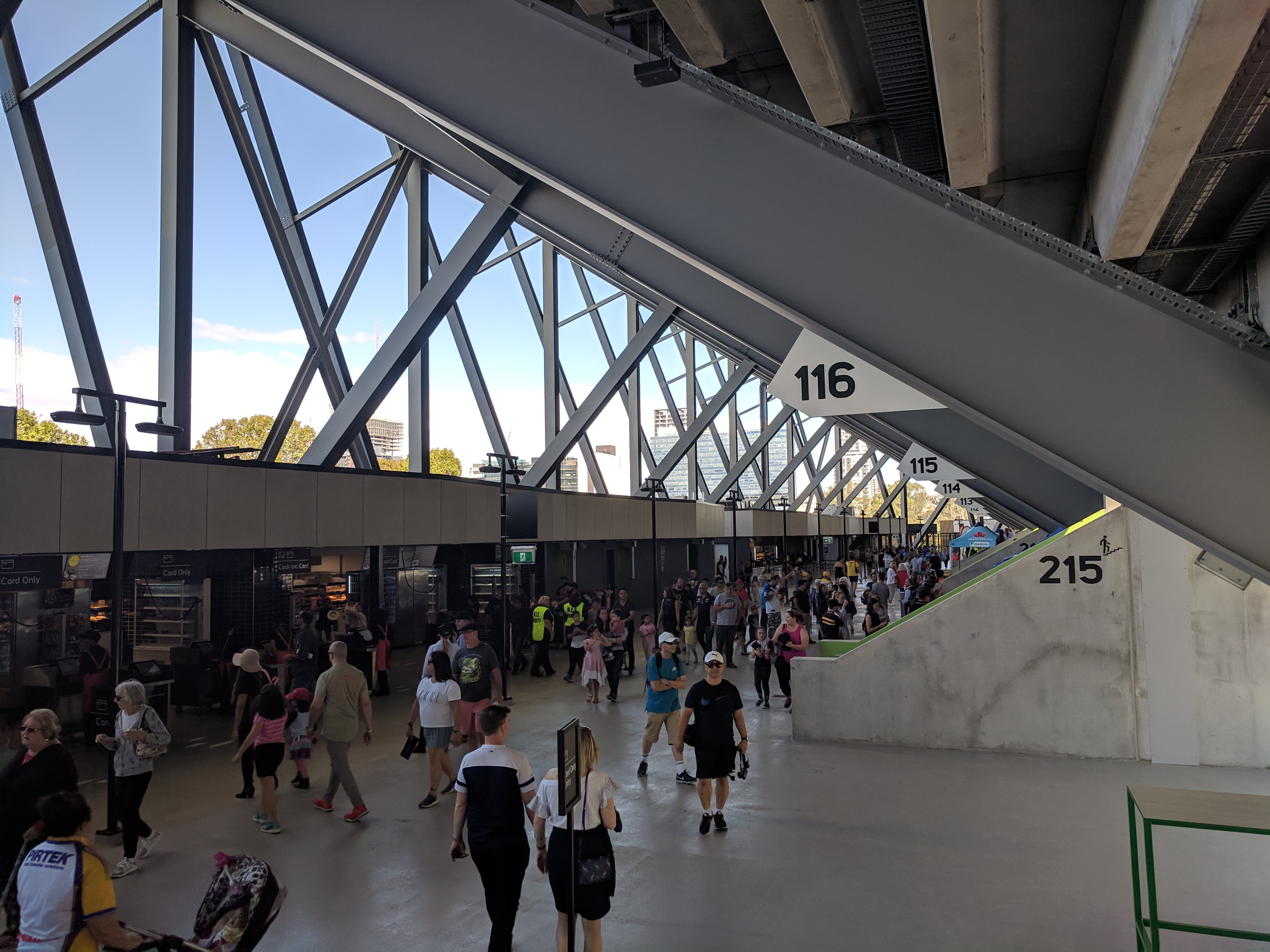
Concourse

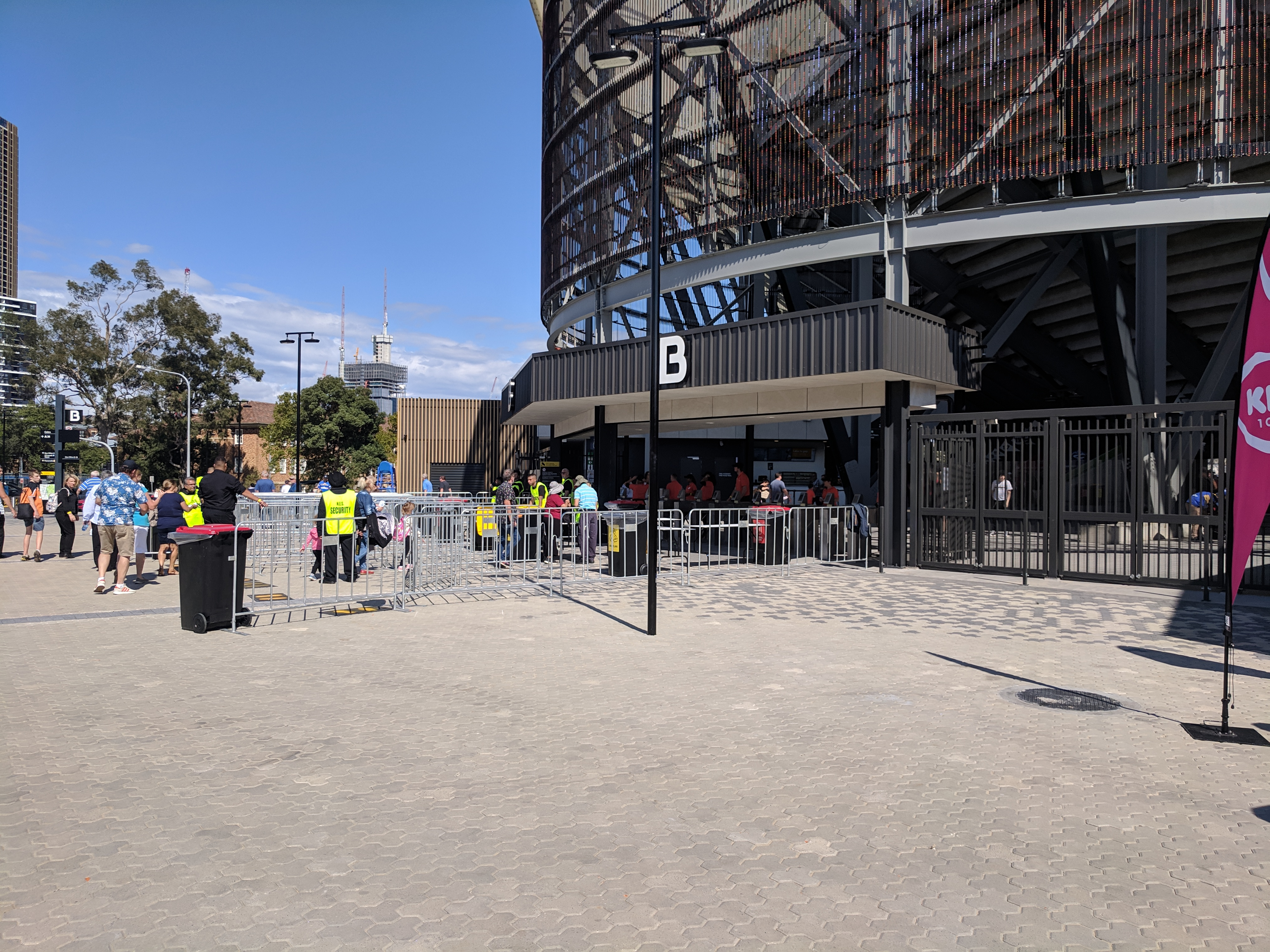
Main gate

The stadium's main purpose is hosting games for the three major football codes in New South Wales. The two major tenants are the Western Sydney Wanderers and the Parramatta Eels. The Wanderers host all A-League home matches, FFA Cup home games from the quarter-finals onwards and Asian Champions League games in the seasons they qualify. The Parramatta Eels host most of their NRL matches, including finals, at the stadium. The Wests Tigers and Canterbury-Bankstown Bulldogs also use the stadium as an alternative venue while Canterbury ended using the stadium as an alternate venue in 2022. These clubs, alongside the South Sydney Rabbitohs, confirmed they'd use the stadium as a temporary home ground from mid 2020 while Stadium Australia is redeveloped. However, this redevelopment never occurred due to the COVID-19 pandemic. As a result of the Sydney Football Stadium redevelopment, the New South Wales Waratahs played 3 Super Rugby matches at the new stadium in their 2019 season.

The dimensions of the pitch meet international standards for soccer and both rugby codes. For rugby union the touch in-goal areas will be 10 metres, at the lower end of the acceptable range of 10 to 22 metres. The stadium is rated to host international matches across the sporting codes. The first rugby test match at the venue took place on 7 September 2019 with the Wallabies playing against Samoa in the lead up to their 2019 Rugby World Cup campaign.

On 2 June 2019, Rugby Australia, the country's national governing body for union, announced that the stadium would become the new host of the country's stops in the men's World Rugby Sevens Series and World Rugby Women's Sevens Series from the 2019–20 season forward.

On 31 August 2019, Football Federation Australia announced that the Australia women's national soccer team ("the Matildas") would play an international friendly match against Chile at the stadium on Saturday 9 November 2019.

The stadium also hosts concerts, the first being Cold Chisel, the Hoodoo Gurus and Birds of Tokyo held on 24 January 2020. This was followed by the final stop of Elton John's Australian tour on 7 March 2020. The Western Grandstand is capable of event hosting on each of the four levels with a maximum single-room capacity of 700 in Level 1 function room.

== History ==
=== Sponsors ===
When the stadium opened in 2019, it was known as Bankwest Stadium, after Bankwest signed a seven-year deal for the naming rights. In September 2021, Commonwealth Bank, the parent company of Bankwest, secured the naming rights agreement, and the stadium was renamed as CommBank Stadium.

=== Rugby league ===
The stadium opened with a rugby league match between the Parramatta Eels and the Wests Tigers on Easter Monday, 22 April 2019. Eels halfback Mitchell Moses scored the first try, conversion and field goal in the stadium at NRL level. Parramatta won the game 51–6 in front of a sell-out crowd of 29,047. The first official try to be scored at the ground was when Bevan French scored for the Wentworthville Magpies against Western Suburbs in the Canterbury Cup NSW game which was played before the main game.

The first NRL finals match at the stadium took place on Sunday, 15 September 2019 with Parramatta defeating the Brisbane Broncos by a record finals margin of 58–0 in front of a then stadium-record crowd of 29,372.

International Rugby League hosted the Rugby League World 9s tournament on the weekend of 18 & 19 October 2019.

After the 2020 NRL season restarted due to its stoppage for the COVID-19 pandemic, Bankwest Stadium was announced as one of the three NSW venues, alongside Campbelltown Stadium and Central Coast Stadium, which would initially host games.

=== Rugby union ===
The New South Wales Waratahs hosted the first match of rugby union at the venue against the South African team the Sharks on 27 April 2019 in the Super Rugby competition. The Waratahs lost 15–23 in front of a crowd of 10,605.

The Wallabies played host to Samoa on 7 September 2019 in which the Wallabies won 34–15 in front of 16,091.

On 1–2 February 2020, the venue hosted the 2020 Sydney Sevens.

On 14 November 2020, the venue hosted Argentina versus New Zealand in the 2020 Tri Nations Series. This match was Los Pumas' first win over the All Blacks in 30 attempts.

=== Soccer ===
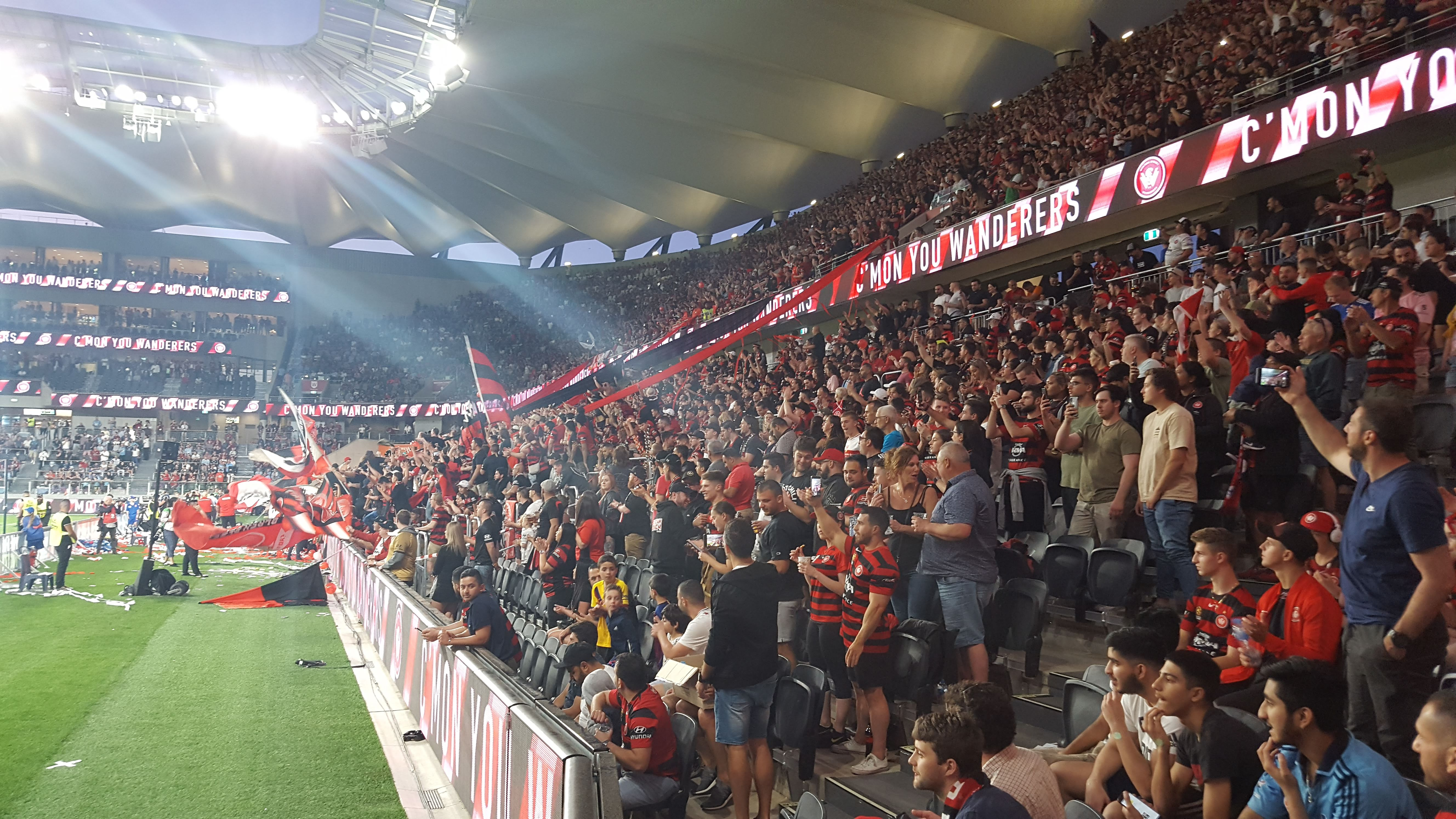
The Northern Stand during the first Sydney derby

The first soccer game held at the new stadium was on 20 July 2019 when Western Sydney Wanderers hosted English side Leeds United. The game was attended by 24,419 which Leeds won 2–1. Leeds player Mateusz Bogusz scored the first goal at the ground, Kwame Yeboah scored the first goal for the Wanderers at their home stadium while Pablo Hernández scored the winning goal in the dying seconds of the match. The game was praised for its good atmosphere as both groups of supporters sang and cheered through the 90 minutes.

On 31 August 2019 APIA Leichhardt FC won the 2019 Men's NSW National Premier League Grand Final at the stadium, defeating Sydney United 58 FC 2–1, with Adrian Ucchino scoring the winning goal in extra time.

The Wanderers hosted their first A-League game at the stadium on 12 October 2019, a come from behind 2–1 win against the Central Coast Mariners FC, with captain of the Wanderers, Mitchell Duke, scoring both goals. The attendance figure was 17,091 which is the Wanderers highest-ever A-League regular season crowd, outside of Sydney Derby matches.

The Wanderers' largest crowd attended two weeks later on 26 October 2019 when they hosted Sydney FC in the Sydney Derby. The game was played in front of 28,519 fans and was won by the Wanderers 1–0.

In November 2019, the stadium held its first international game with the Matildas hosting Chile in front of a 20,029 crowd, a record for an international women's game in Australia at the time.

== Attendance records ==
Sport	Attendance	Date	Result	Event
Rugby League	29,411	1 November 2026	Tonga 20–18 Samoa	2026 Rugby League World Cup
Rugby League	29,397	6 April 2026	Parramatta Eels 20–22 Wests Tigers	2026 NRL season
Rugby League	29,372	15 September 2019	Parramatta Eels 58–0 Brisbane Broncos	2019 NRL Finals Series
Rugby League	29,171	9 March 2024	Parramatta Eels 26–8 Canterbury-Bankstown Bulldogs	2024 NRL season
Rugby League	29,134	16 September 2022	Parramatta Eels 40–4 Canberra Raiders	2022 NRL finals series
Rugby League	29,047	22 April 2019	Parramatta Eels 51–6 Wests Tigers	2019 NRL season
Soccer	28,519	26 October 2019	Western Sydney Wanderers 1–0 Sydney FC	2019–20 A-League
Rugby League	28,366	18 April 2022	Parramatta Eels 20–21 Wests Tigers	2022 NRL season
Rugby League	28,084	9 November 2025	New Zealand 36–14 Samoa	2025 Pacific Championships
Soccer	27,998	2 March 2024	Western Sydney Wanderers 1–4 Sydney FC	2023–24 A-League Men

== Transport connections ==
Parramatta railway station is serviced by trains of the North Shore & Western Line, Cumberland Line and Blue Mountains Line. The Parramatta River ferry route begins at Circular Quay in the Sydney CBD and includes stops along the river such as Darling Harbour, Meadowbank and Sydney Olympic Park, terminating at the Parramatta ferry wharf. The Parramatta Light Rail will also service the new stadium via the Prince Alfred Square stop. All are located in the Parramatta CBD within a one-kilometre, 15-minute walking distance to the stadium.
