= The Entertainment Quarter =

Australian entertainment precinct

Coordinates: 33°53′39″S 151°13′32″E

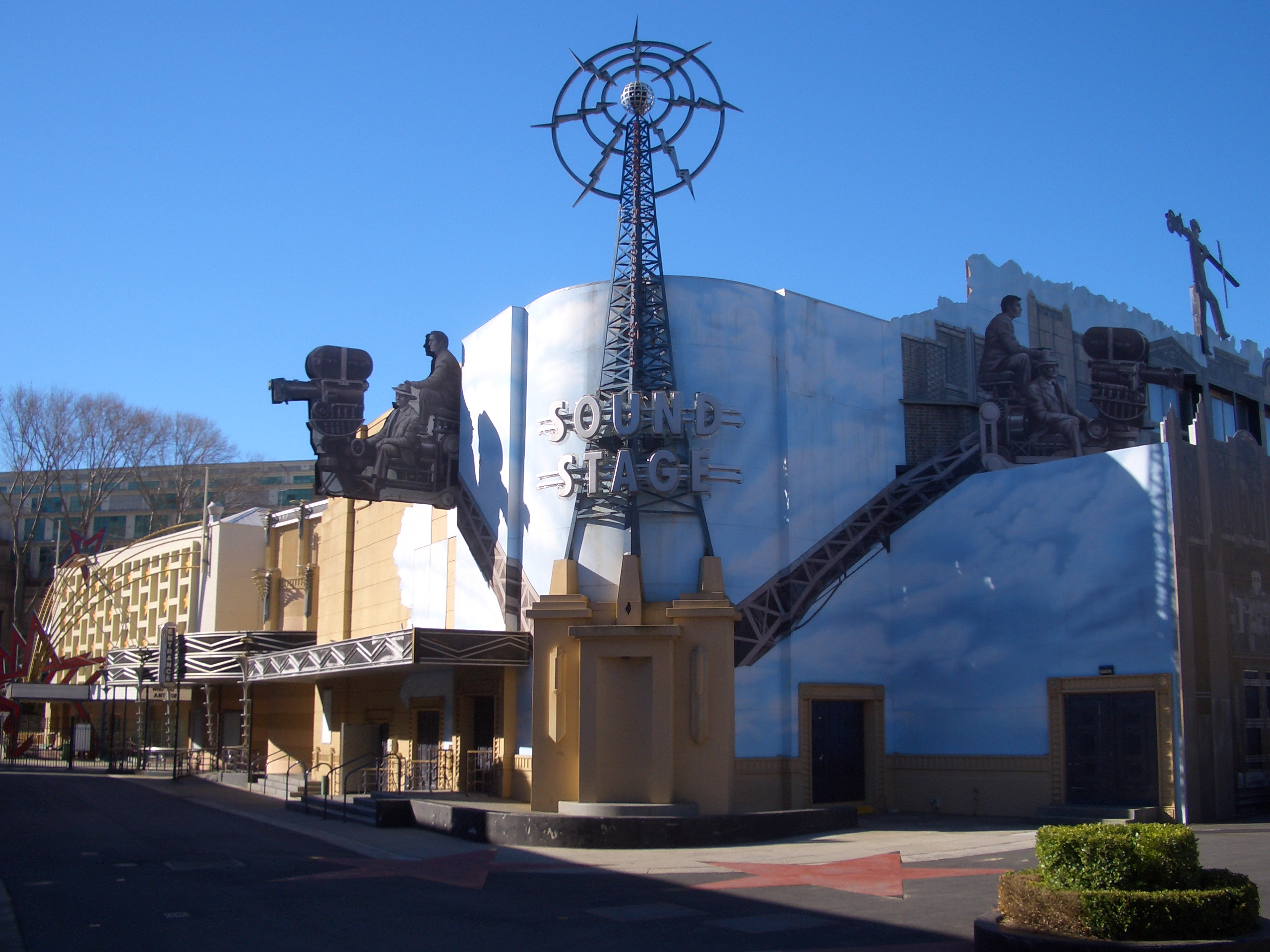
Fox Studios Australia

The Entertainment Quarter is an entertainment precinct in the Eastern Suburbs of Sydney, Australia. The Entertainment Quarter sits beside Disney Studios Australia in the suburb of Moore Park, 3 kilometres (1.9 mi)s south-east of the Sydney central business district.

== History ==
The Entertainment Quarter and Fox Studios Australia were originally the site of Royal Agricultural Society of New South Wales Sydney Showground, which hosted the annual Sydney Royal Easter Show. The Sydney Showground moved to Sydney Olympic Park in preparation for the 2000 Summer Olympics. It was developed by Lendlease and News Corp Australia. In 2004, it was sold to CFS Retail Property Trust. In 2014, it was sold to Gerry Harvey, John Singleton and Mark Carnegie.

Fox Studios Australia and the entertainment precinct opened at Moore Park in 1998. A theme park at this location was closed, and some of the facilities have found new uses in the Entertainment Quarter.

== Overview ==
Located next to the Sydney Cricket Ground and Sydney Football Stadium, and Disney Studios Australia (previously Fox Studios) which is home to over 50 film and TV studios located just a gate away – shooting everything from major motion pictures, to local film and TV productions.

Inside the Entertainment Quarter is the Hordern Pavilion, which hosts live music and other events, and a live venue known as Liberty Hall (previously Max Watts).

== Facilities ==
The Market Canopy located in the heart of The Entertainment Quarter's Showring hosts a bi-weekly Market on every Wednesday and Saturday.

The Entertainment Quarter is home to restaurants, cafes, stores and activities.

EQ is the home of Sydney Roosters, Sydney FC, the Sydney Kings basketball courts, Hoops Capital, and new Sydney Swans headquarters at the Royal Hall of Industries.

There are many live event spaces located at The Entertainment Quarter, including a 22,000-square-metre (240,000 sq ft) space known as the Showring, where large-scale shows such as Cirque, Van Gogh Alive, and the Sydney Family Easter Show are held.

There is "Hyperkarting" on Level 5 of the carpark; a Hoyts Cinema; arcades at B. Lucy and Sons; bowling at Strike Bowling; live comedy at The Comedy Store, and the new World Gym.

== Education ==
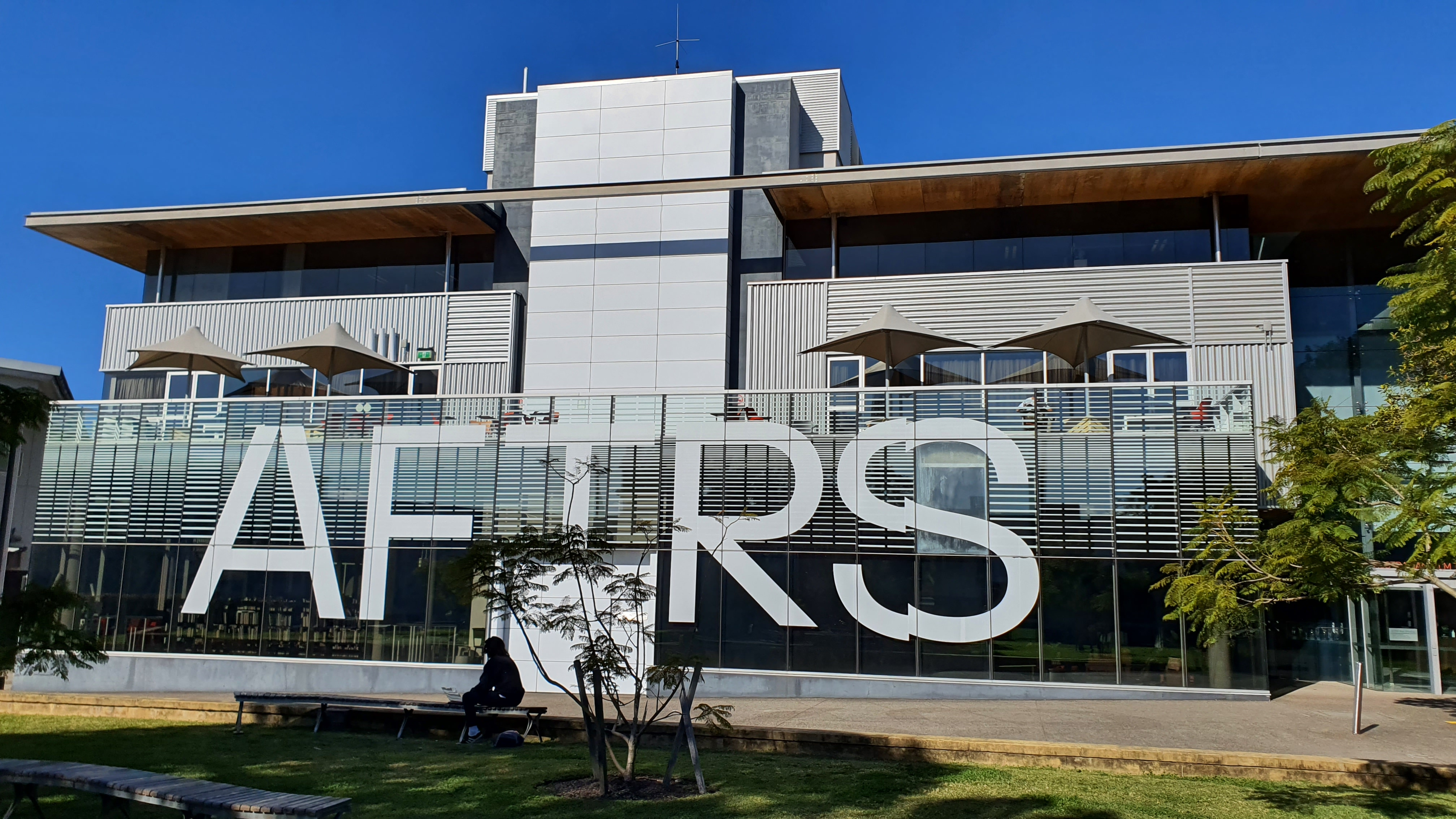
AFTRS building

The Entertainment Quarter is home to the Australian Film Television & Radio School (AFTRS). AFTRS relocated from its original location in North Ryde to a purpose built building in 2008, located adjacent to Fox Studios Australia and around the corner from the Hoyts Cinema.

Also located within the Entertainment Quarter is Brent Street performing arts school, which runs classes for children and adults.

== Gallery ==
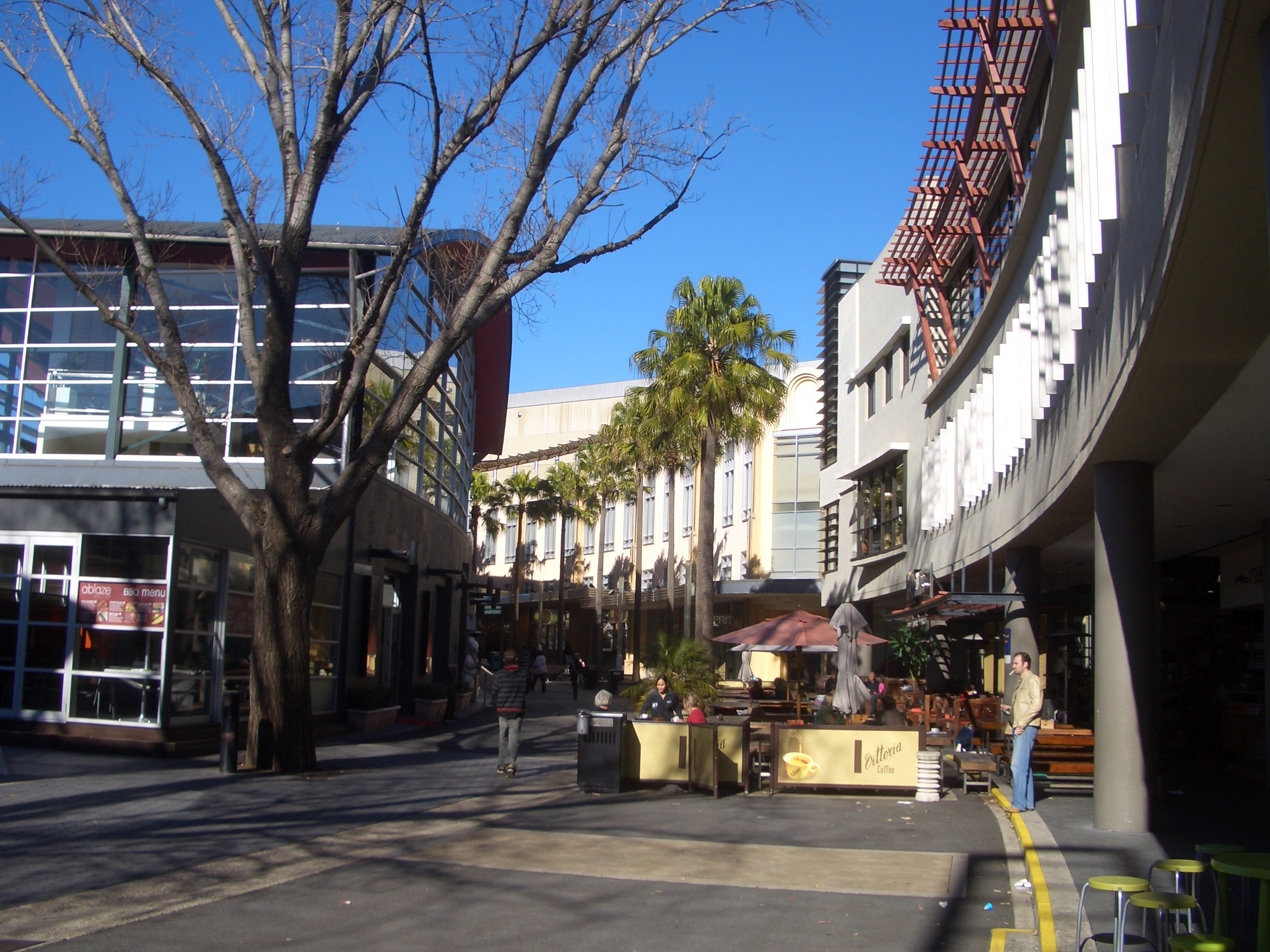
Bent Street

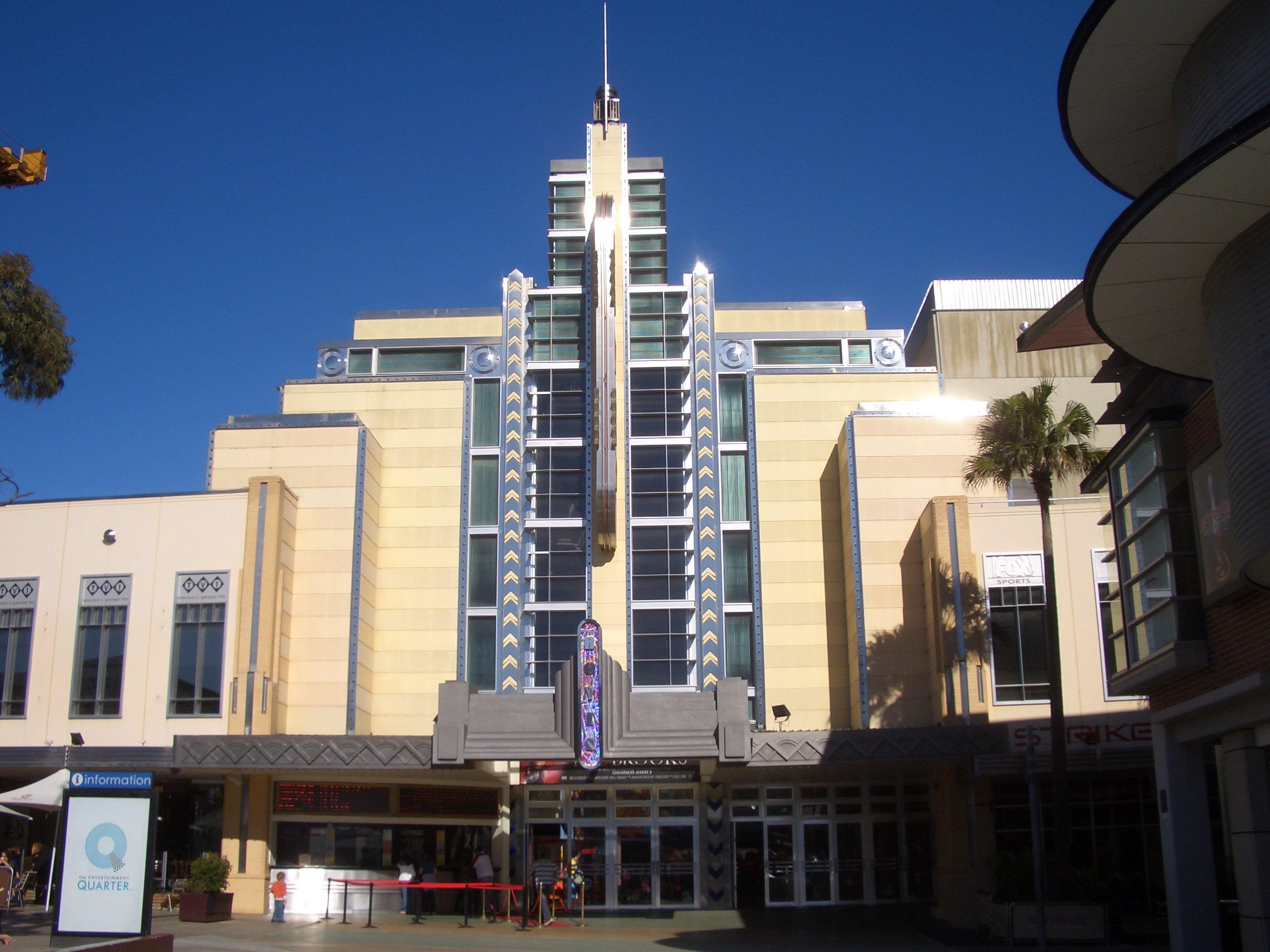
Hoyts Cinemas

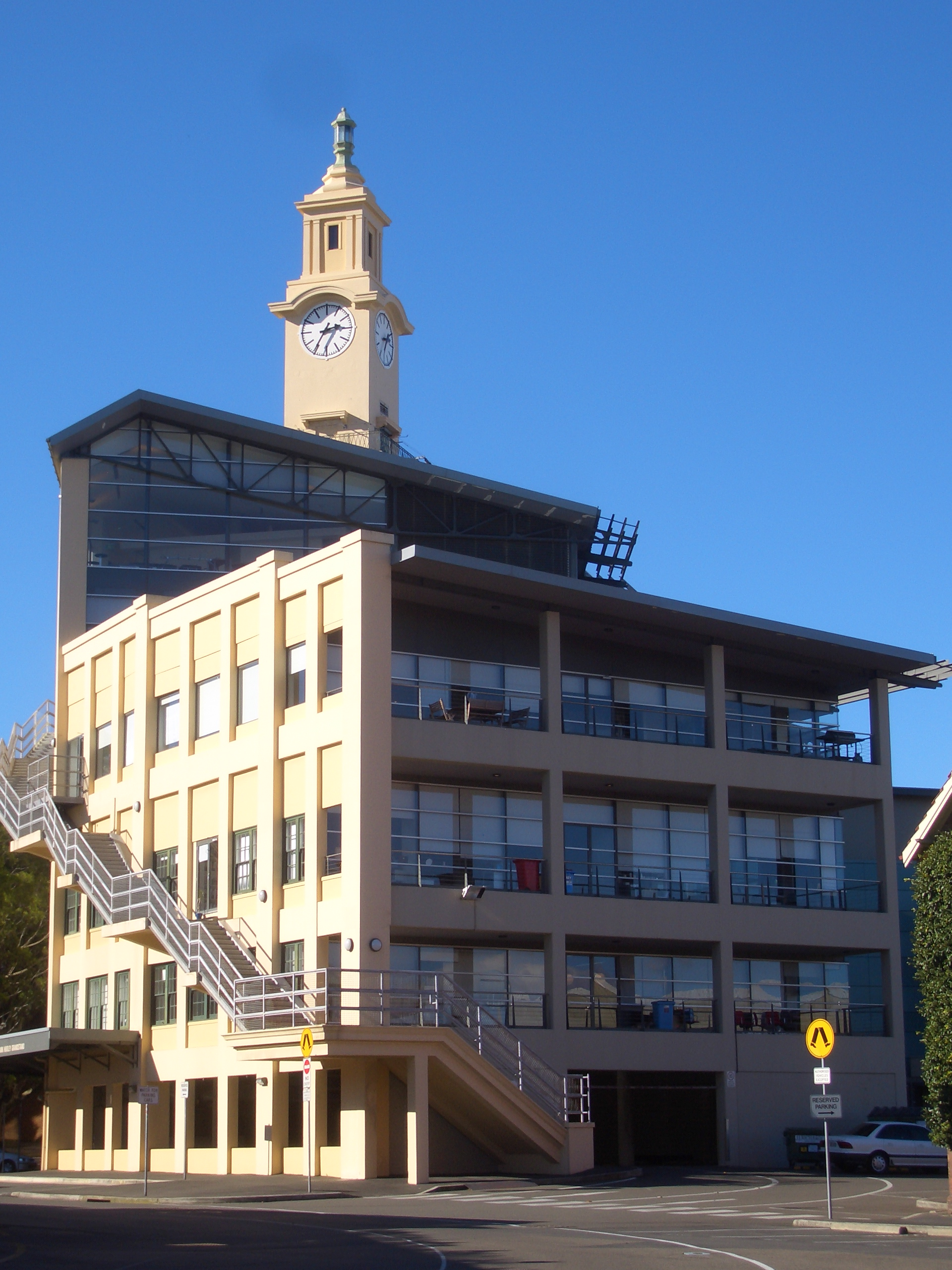
Old Showring

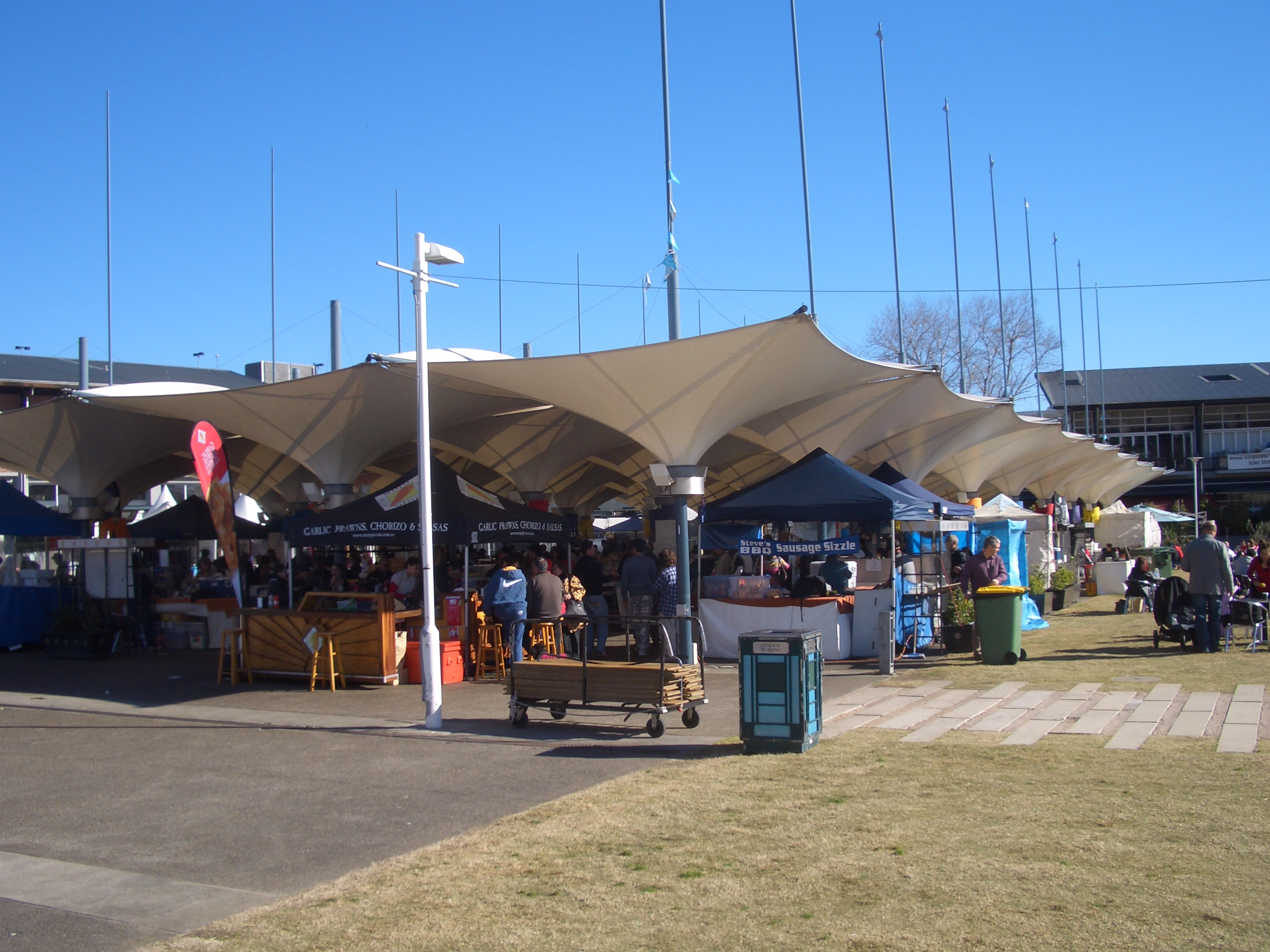
Showring markets

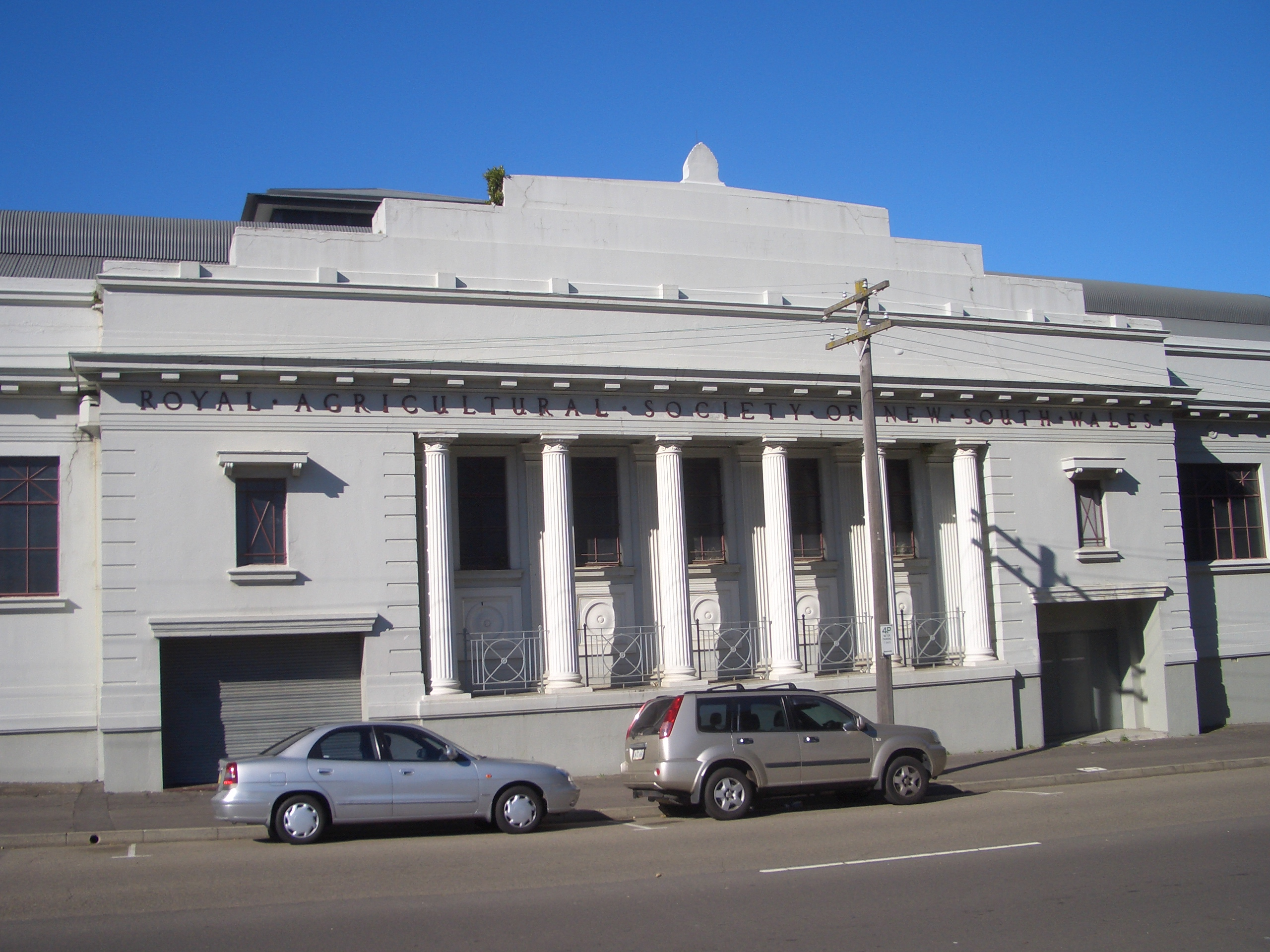
Hordern Pavilion

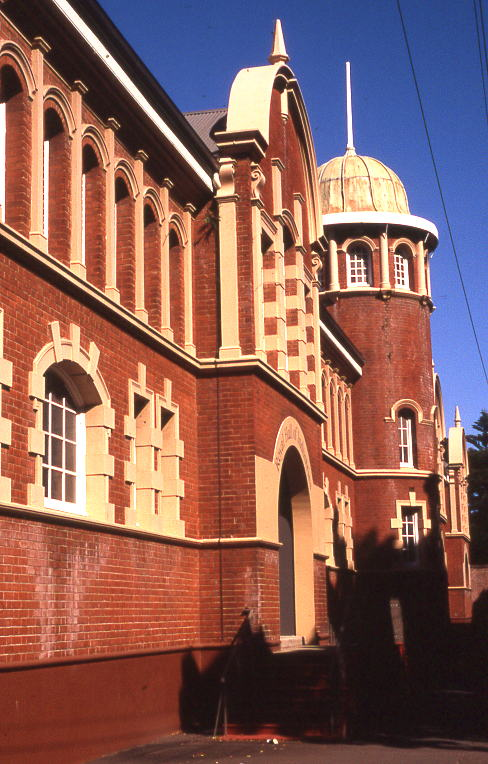
Royal Hall of Industries

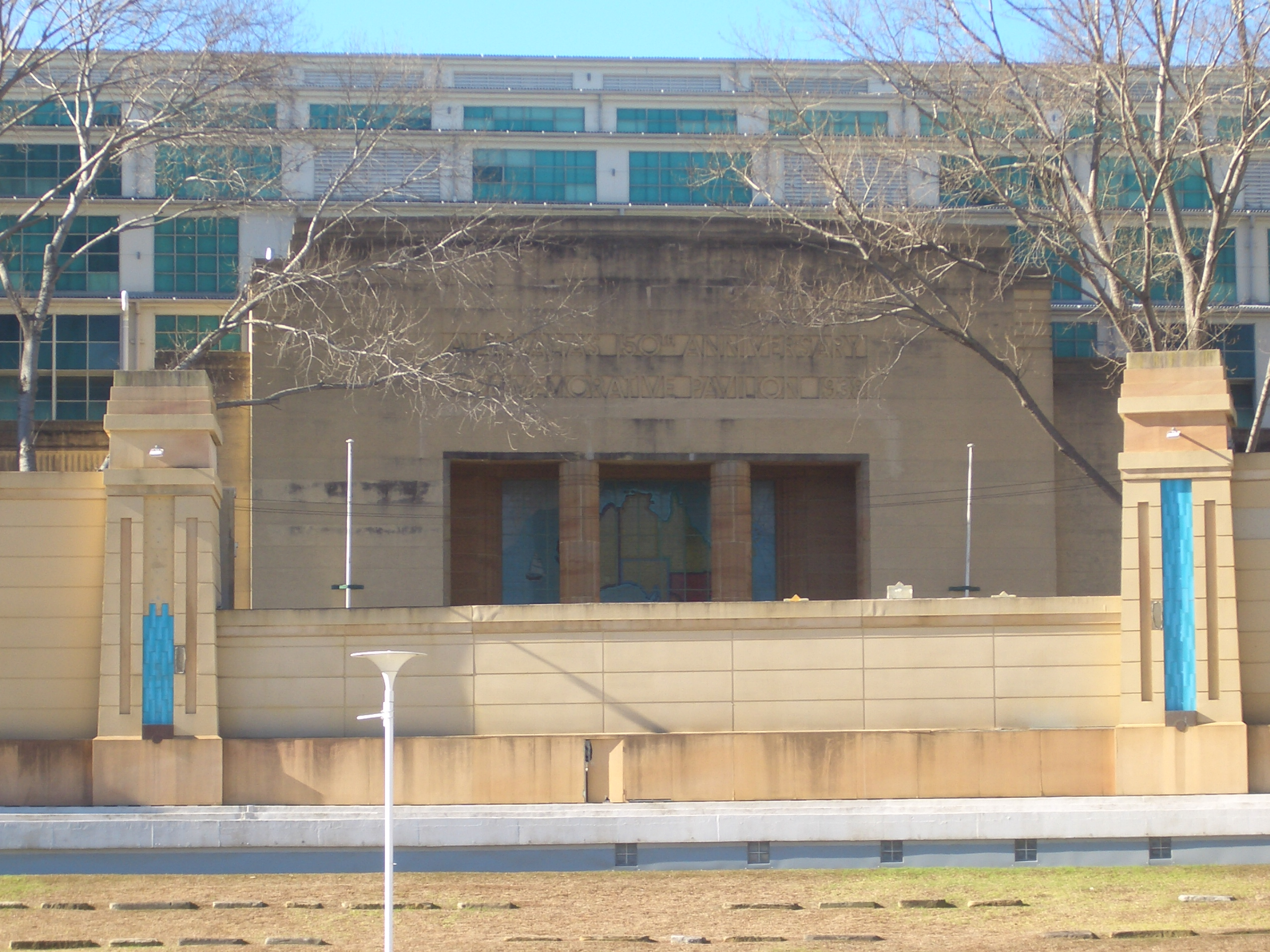
Commemorative Pavilion

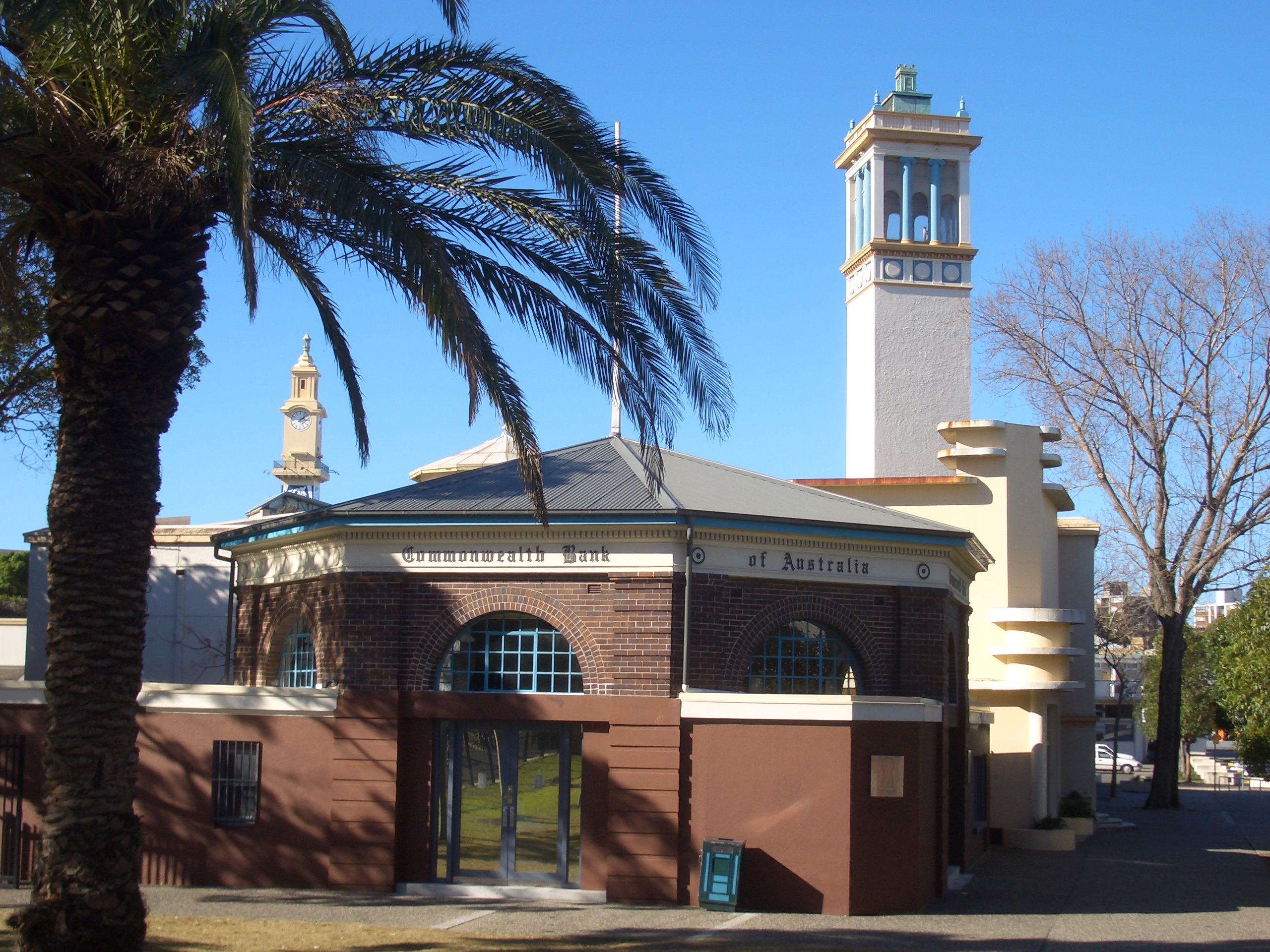
Old Showground

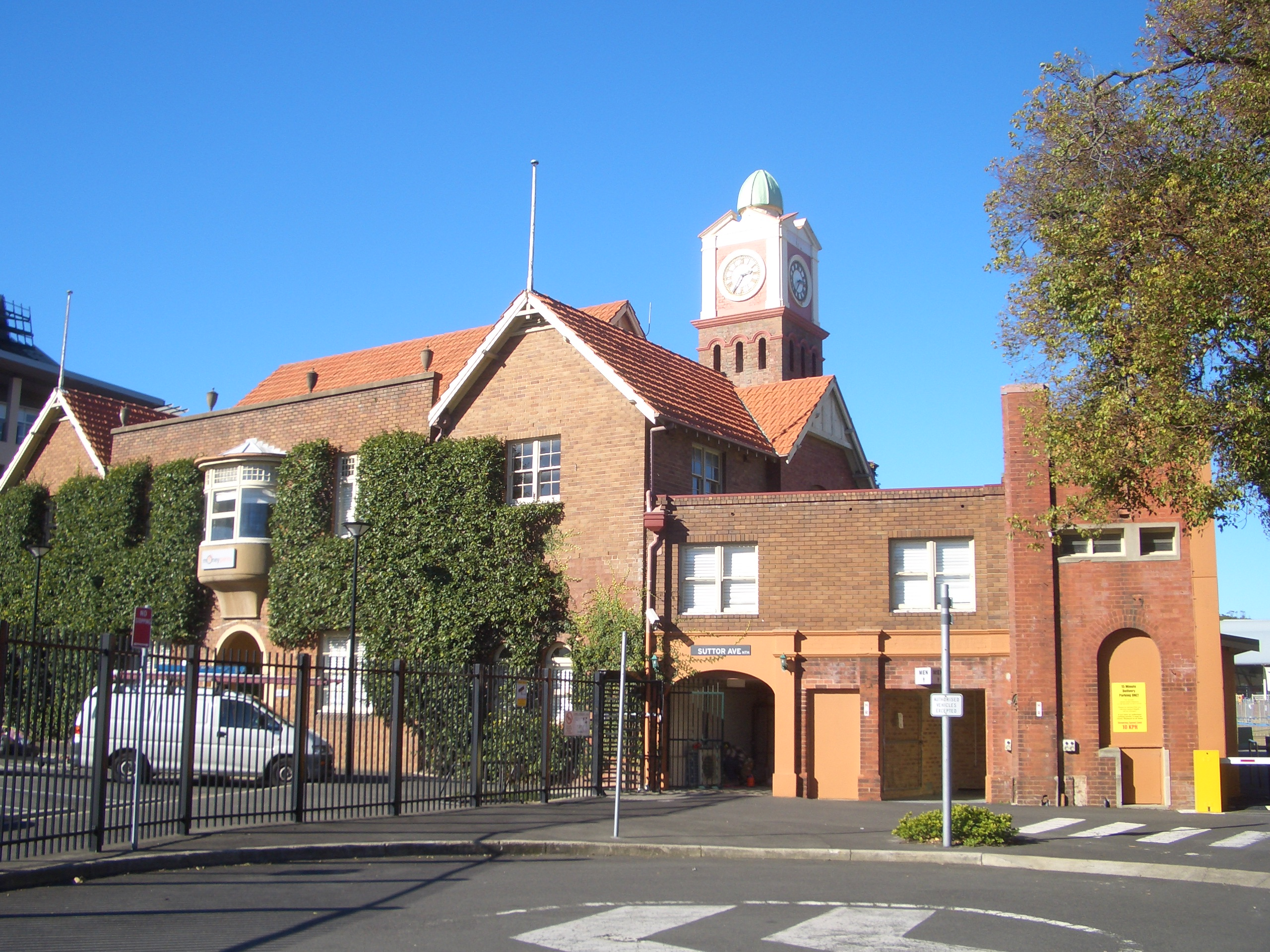
Old Showground

== Transport ==
The Entertainment Quarter is located near the Moore Park stop of the CBD and South East Light Rail. The multi-storey car park has capacity for 2,000 cars.
