= Moore Park, New South Wales =

Suburb of Sydney, New South Wales, Australia

Moore Park
- Suburb
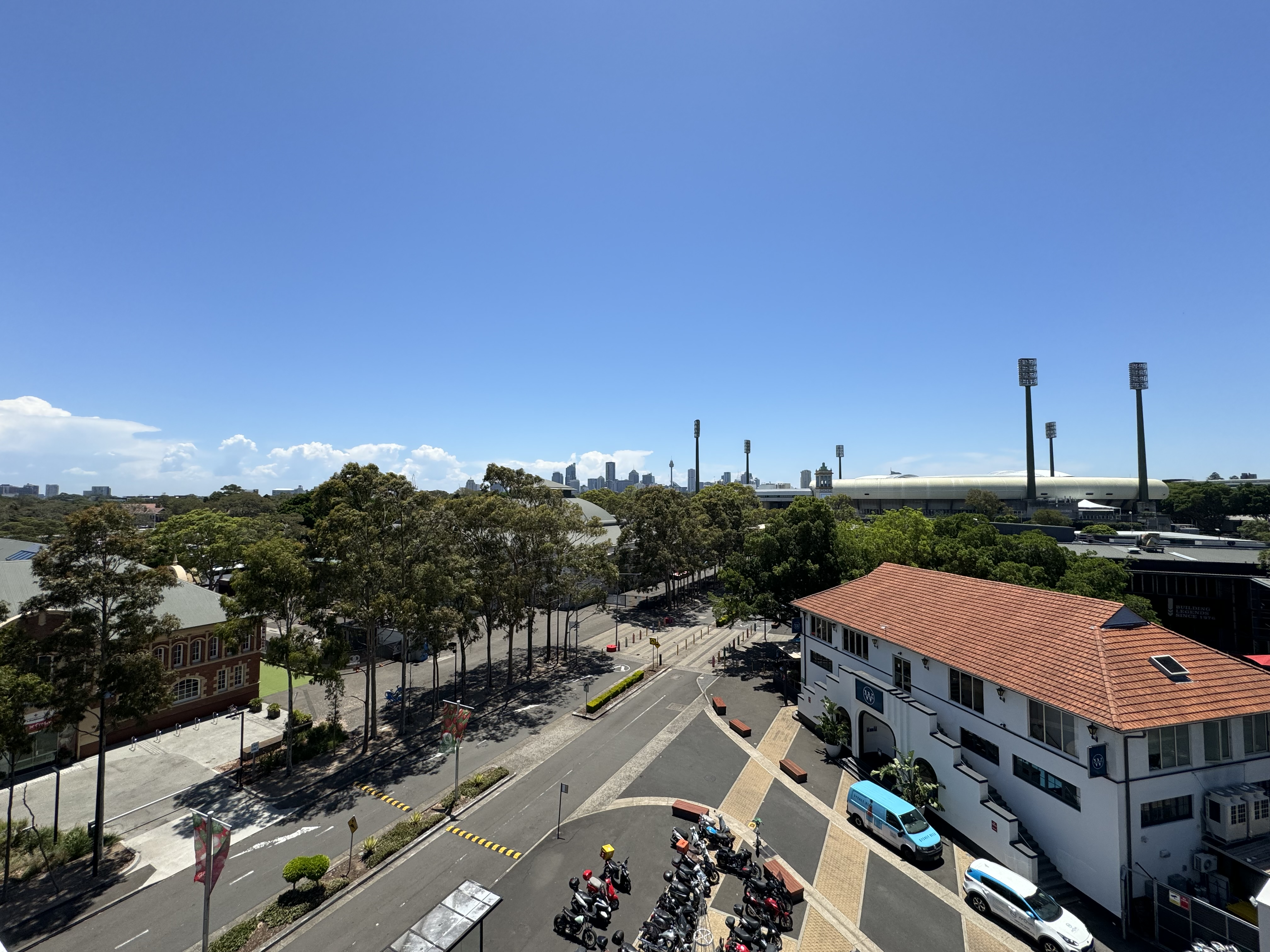
- Moore Park, New South Wales

- Interactive map of Moore Park
- Coordinates: 33°53′48″S 151°13′12″E
- Country: Australia
- State: New South Wales
- City: Sydney
- LGA: City of Sydney
- Location: 3 km (1.9 mi) from Sydney CBD

Government
  - State electorate: Sydney
  - Federal division: Wentworth

Area
  - Total: 1.86 km^{2} (0.72 sq mi)
- Elevation: 43 m (141 ft)

Population
  - Total: 18 (SAL 2021)
- Postcode: 2021
Suburbs around Moore Park
Surry Hills	Paddington	Paddington
Redfern	Moore Park	Centennial Park
Zetland	Kensington	Randwick

Moore Park is a suburb in the Eastern Suburbs of Sydney located 3 kilometres (1.9 mi) from the CBD, in the state of New South Wales, Australia. It is part of local government area of the City of Sydney.

Moore Park is also a large area of parkland that is part of Centennial Parklands, a collective of three parks being Moore Park, Centennial Park and Queen's Park. Centennial Parklands is administered by the Centennial Park & Moore Park Trust, a NSW government agency. The only exception is the land on which the Sydney Cricket Ground and Sydney Football Stadium are sited; these stadiums are managed by the Sydney Cricket Ground Trust.

== History ==
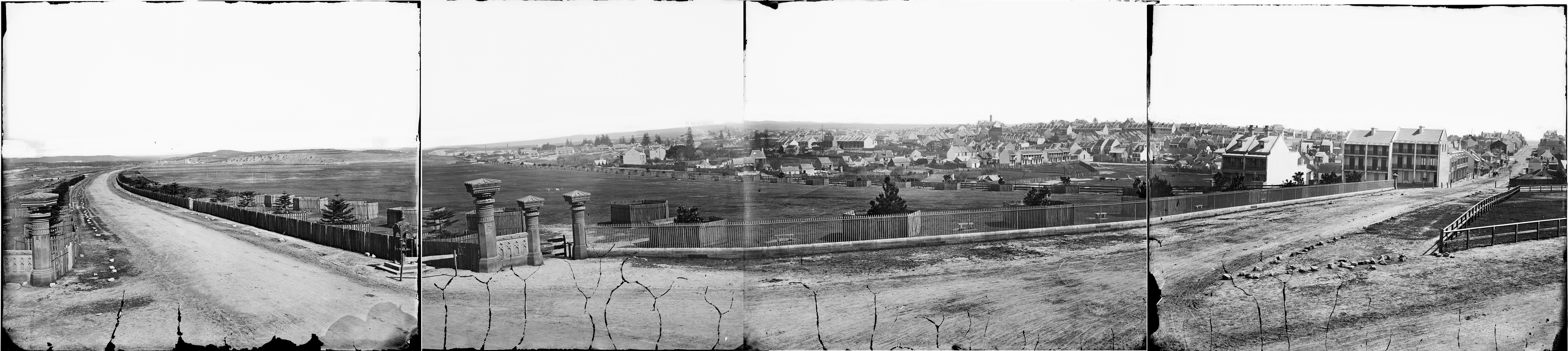
Panorama of Moore Park and Surry Hills from the entrance gates to Moore Park, c. 1875

Originally known as the Sydney Common it covered some 153 hectares to the South East of the town and was designated as one of Australia's earliest parks in 1866, the following year it was named after Charles Moore, the Mayor of Sydney City Council. In 1867 several of the sandhills were levelled and three years later nearly half of the park was covered with grass. The straight lines of Randwick Road, which passes through the park, was fenced in and replaced the old curved road. In 1837 a new water supply was built to replace the polluted 'Tank Stream' which had to that time been the colonists main supply of water. The new line connected the Busby Bore with water from the Lachlan Swamp in what is now known as Moore Park.

The Moore Park grounds were in 1871 granted to the Wallaroo FC for rugby union matches, expanding to other clubs and football codes by the early 1880s. Moore Park was also the site of Sydney's first Zoo. The Moore Park Zoological Gardens opened in 1884, and was run by less than a dozen people. Built in the area known as Billygoat Swamp, it was subject to flooding and creating problems for both keepers and the animals. As Sydney grew, so did the demand for a larger zoo. It was eventually closed down and the animals were moved to the Taronga Zoo, when it opened in 1916. Sydney Girls' High School and later Sydney Boys High School also occupied this site.

The Moore Park Toll House appears to have been built in 1849 and still exits on the corner of Anzac Parade and Cleveland Street. It is the only two-storey toll house in New South Wales.

== Heritage listings ==
Moore Park has a number of heritage-listed sites, including:

- Driver Avenue: Sydney Cricket Ground Members' Stand and Lady Members' Stand

== Commercial area ==
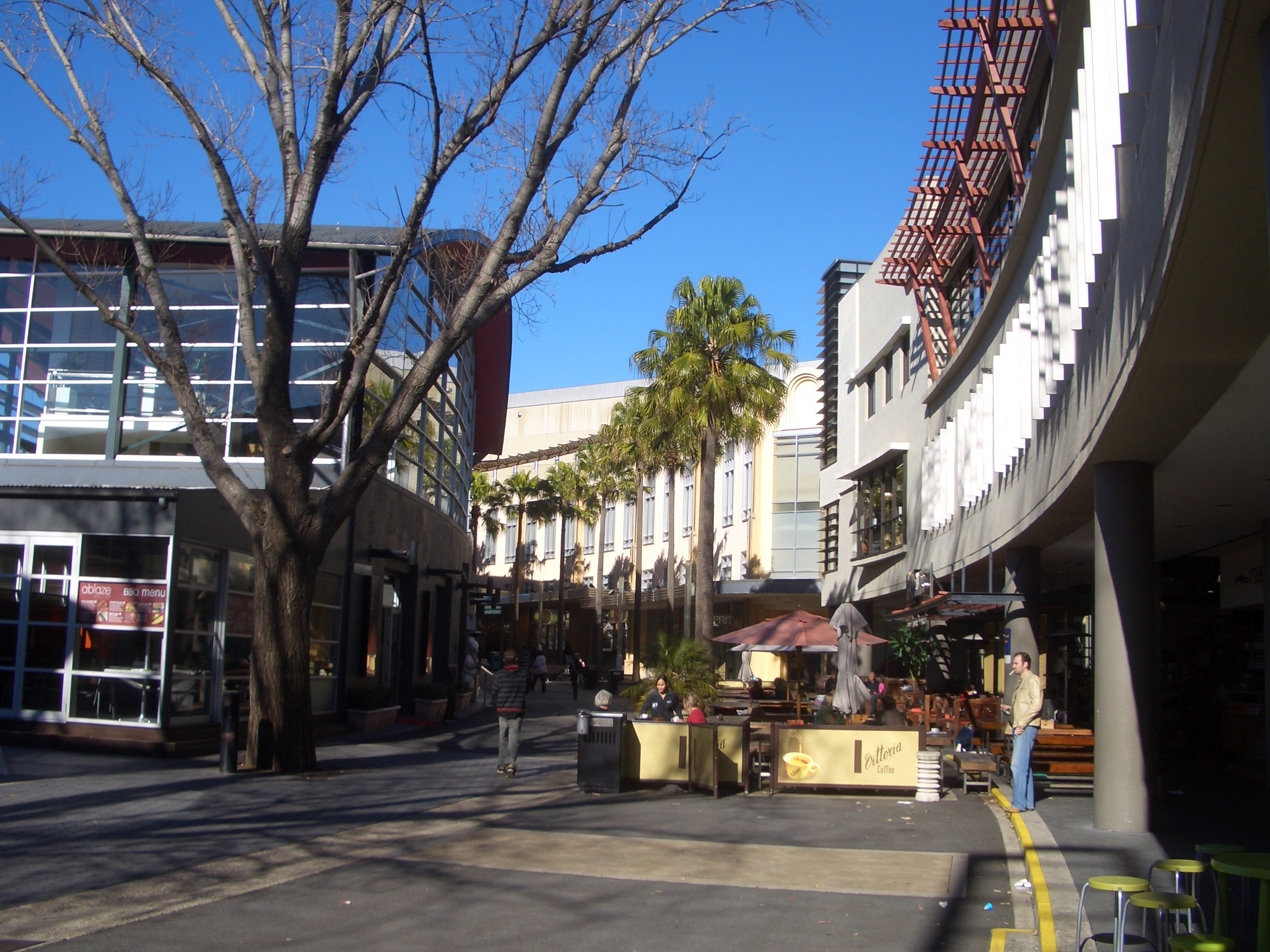
Bent Street, The Entertainment Quarter

Moore Park is the former location of the Royal Agricultural Society's Sydney Showground which opened in the early 1880s. The ground's hosted the annual Sydney Royal Easter Show until 1998. It moved to Homebush Bay (the site of the 2000 Summer Olympics). The old showgrounds have since been redeveloped as Fox Studios, now Disney Studios Australia, a commercial venture designed at supporting Australia's film industry. The Entertainment Quarter is a retail, dining and entertainment precinct beside the studios. It contains cinemas, live venues, restaurants, cafes, pubs, and retailers of fashion and homewares. The Farmer's Market also operates every Wednesday and Saturday in the old showground showing.

The south-western corner of the suburb boasts showrooms for home furnishings and home renovations. This was the site of the former Dowling Street depot for trams.

== Transport ==
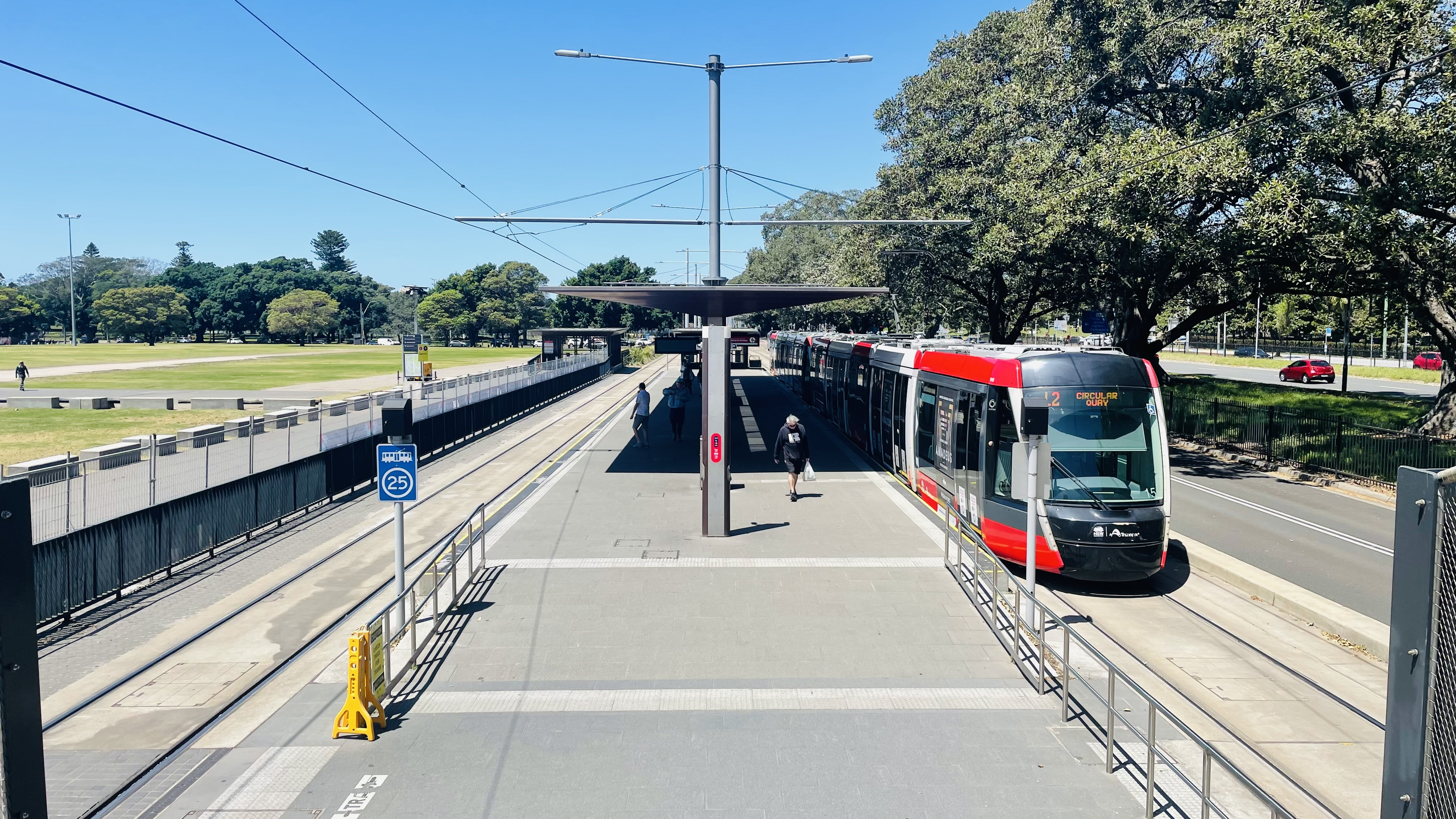
Light rail Moore Park stop

The Eastern Distributor and Anzac Parade are major arterial roads on the western border of the suburb. Transdev John Holland operate frequent bus services to Moore Park from the Sydney CBD. Special services for sporting events from Central railway station have been replaced by services on the CBD and South East Light Rail from December 2019.

Moore Park is served by the CBD and South East Light Rail. The line originates in the Sydney CBD then heads across to Moore Park and under a specially constructed tunnel below Anzac Parade. South of Moore Park the line splits into two branches – one continuing down Anzac Parade to Kingsford, and the other heading to Randwick via Alison Road. Services commenced on the Randwick branch to Moore Park in December 2019.

The light rail stop is directly opposite Sydney Girls High School and within walking distance of Sydney Football Stadium, Sydney Cricket Ground and The Entertainment Quarter.

== Sports stadiums and facilities ==
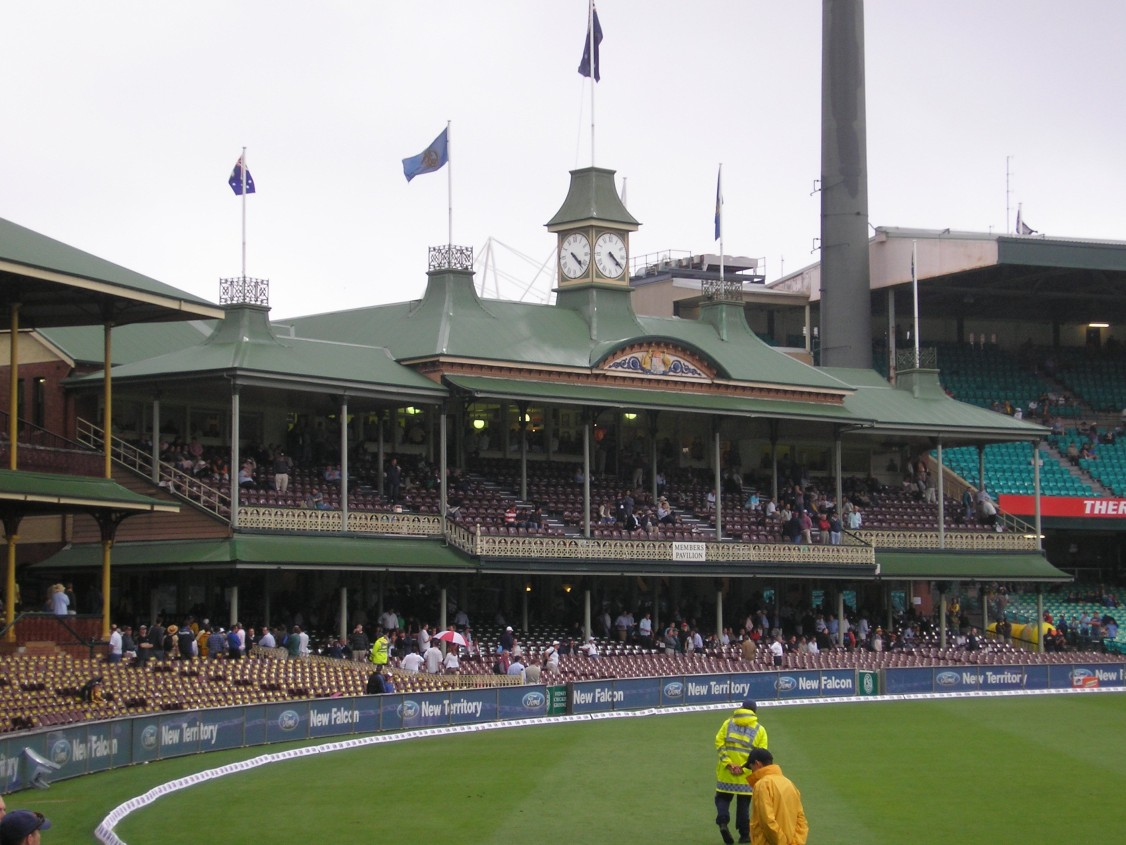
Sydney Cricket Ground, The Members' stand

Moore Park is the location of two of Sydney's largest sporting venues, the Sydney Cricket Ground (SCG) and Sydney Football Stadium (SFS), as well as the previously used Sydney Showground oval which remains housed within The Entertainment Quarter. The SFS is situated on the site of the Sydney Sports Ground which opened in 1903. This stadium precinct has hosted cricket since the mid-1850s and football (all codes) since the early 1880s. First grade rugby union and Australian rules games were played earlier in Moore Park on the adjacent open fields to the west, beginning with the Wallaroo FC (rugby) in 1871.

The Sydney Roosters Rugby league team in the National Rugby League, The Sydney Swans in the Australian Football League, Sydney FC A-League football team, NSW Waratahs rugby union team have their administration offices at Moore Park and Sydney Football Stadium is their home ground. The Moore Park Magpies are a local junior rugby league team.

The Hordern Pavilion is a multipurpose entertainment venue, while next door the Royal Hall of Industries (fondly remembered as the old Showbag Pavilion during the Royal Easter Show days) has hosted a range of exhibitions, social and commercial events and shows. Moore Park also houses Kippax Lake, an artificial lake named after William Kippax, an alderman of the 1860s and grandfather of the cricketer Alan Kippax, the ES Marks Athletics Field, the Moore Park Golf Course, the Parklands Sports Centre and a number of sports fields.

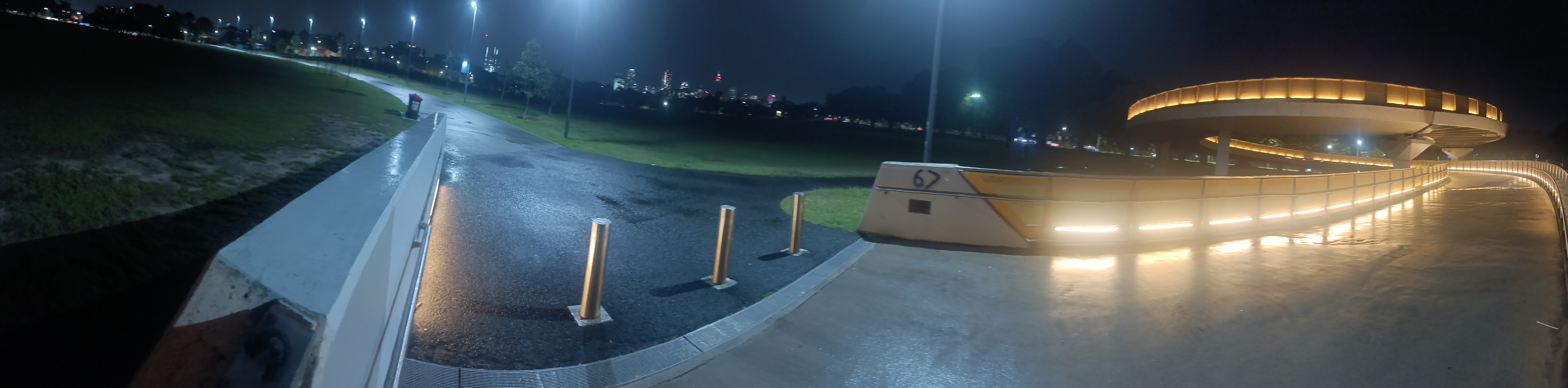
Pedestrian walkway connecting the eastern and western sides of Moore Park. 2026.

In October 2018, the Swans and the Government of New South Wales announced an intention to upgrade the Pavilion and Hall of Industries. The Hall was to be equipped with indoor sporting and rehabilitation facilities and an international-standard netball court, providing permanent indoor training facilities for the Swans and professional netball club the New South Wales Swifts. The Hordern Pavilion would retain its live music scene and undergo a significant restoration to improve facilities for patrons and performers. The two precincts would also be joined closer together with barriers between them removed and cafes and other community facilities installed for use by the general public. The Swans train on the Tramway Oval (previously known as Lakeside Oval), located adjacent to the Sydney Cricket Ground, during the non-football season. The oval completed an extensive redevelopment in April 2019 and has identical dimensions to Docklands Stadium in Melbourne. In April 2020 the Swans pulled out of the agreement with the Government and Swifts, citing the financial implications of the COVID-19 pandemic. The agreement was renegotiated in August 2021, and completed in late 2022.

== Schools ==
Sydney Boys High School

Moore Park, served by the Department of Education, is the location of Sydney Boys High School, Sydney Girls High School (both of which are selective high schools).

== Population ==
At the 2021 census, the population of Moore Park was 18.

The 2016 census showed that Moore Park had a population of 28.

== Gallery ==
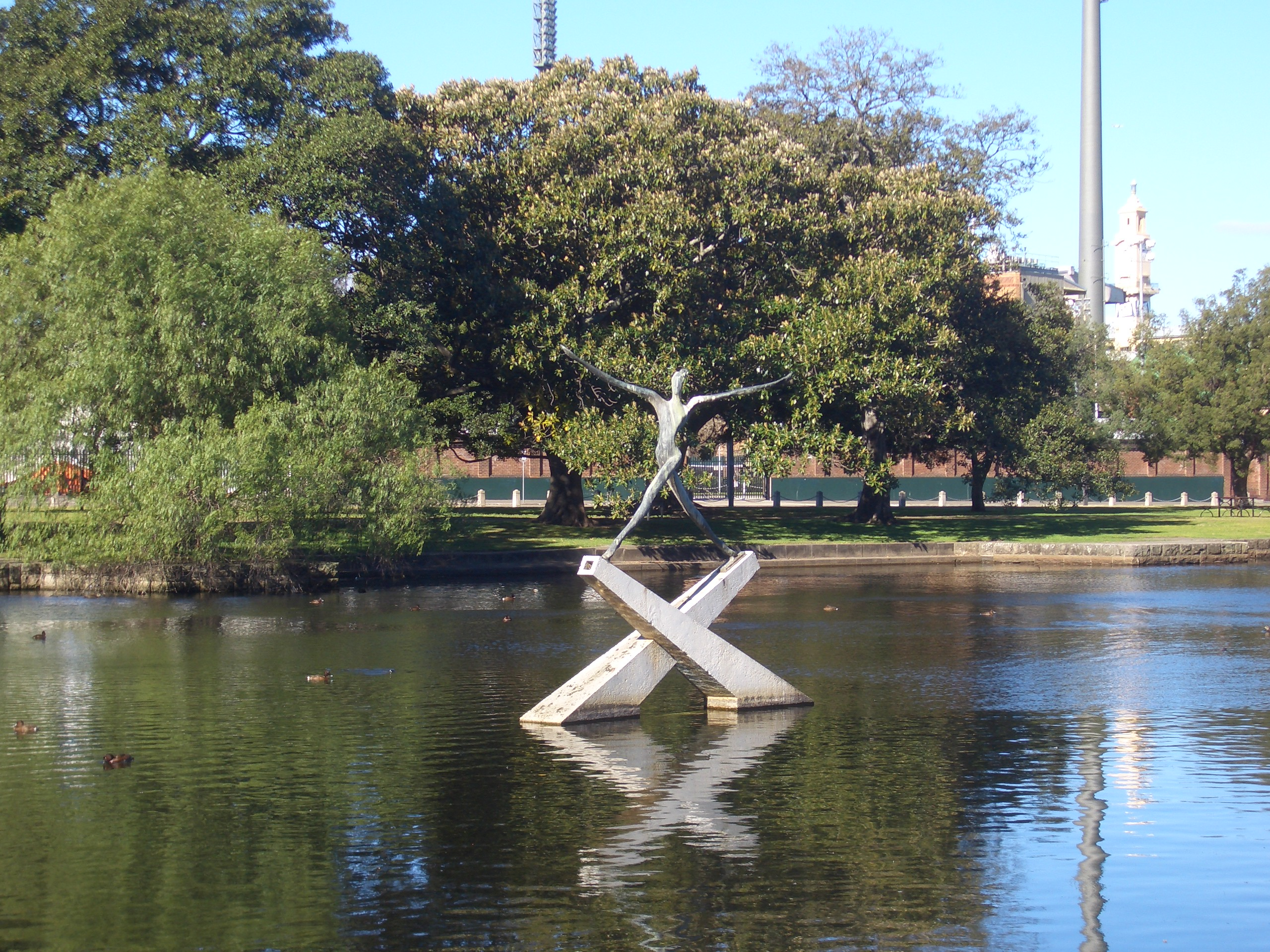
Kippax Lake

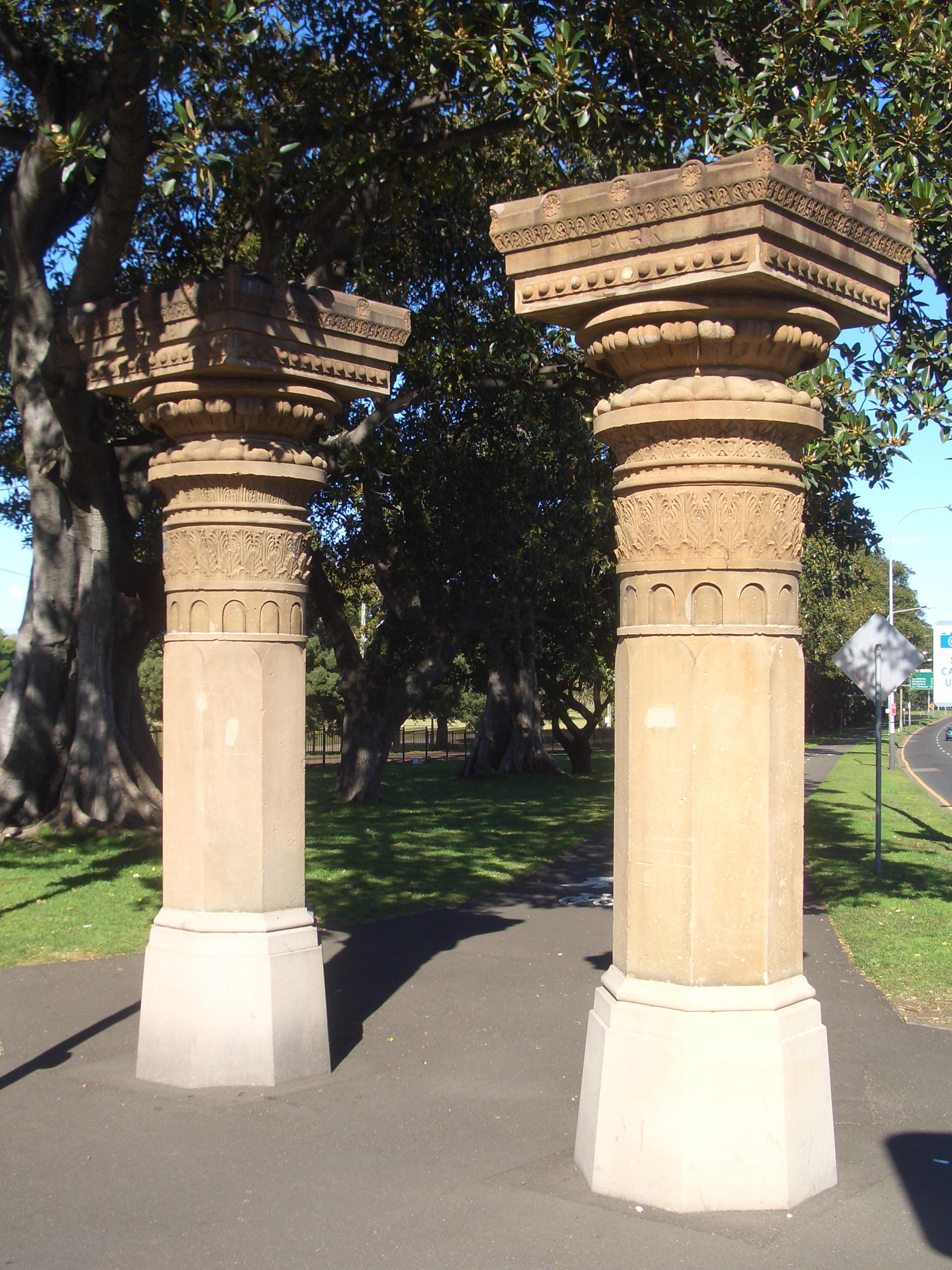
Moore Park Gate Anzac Parade

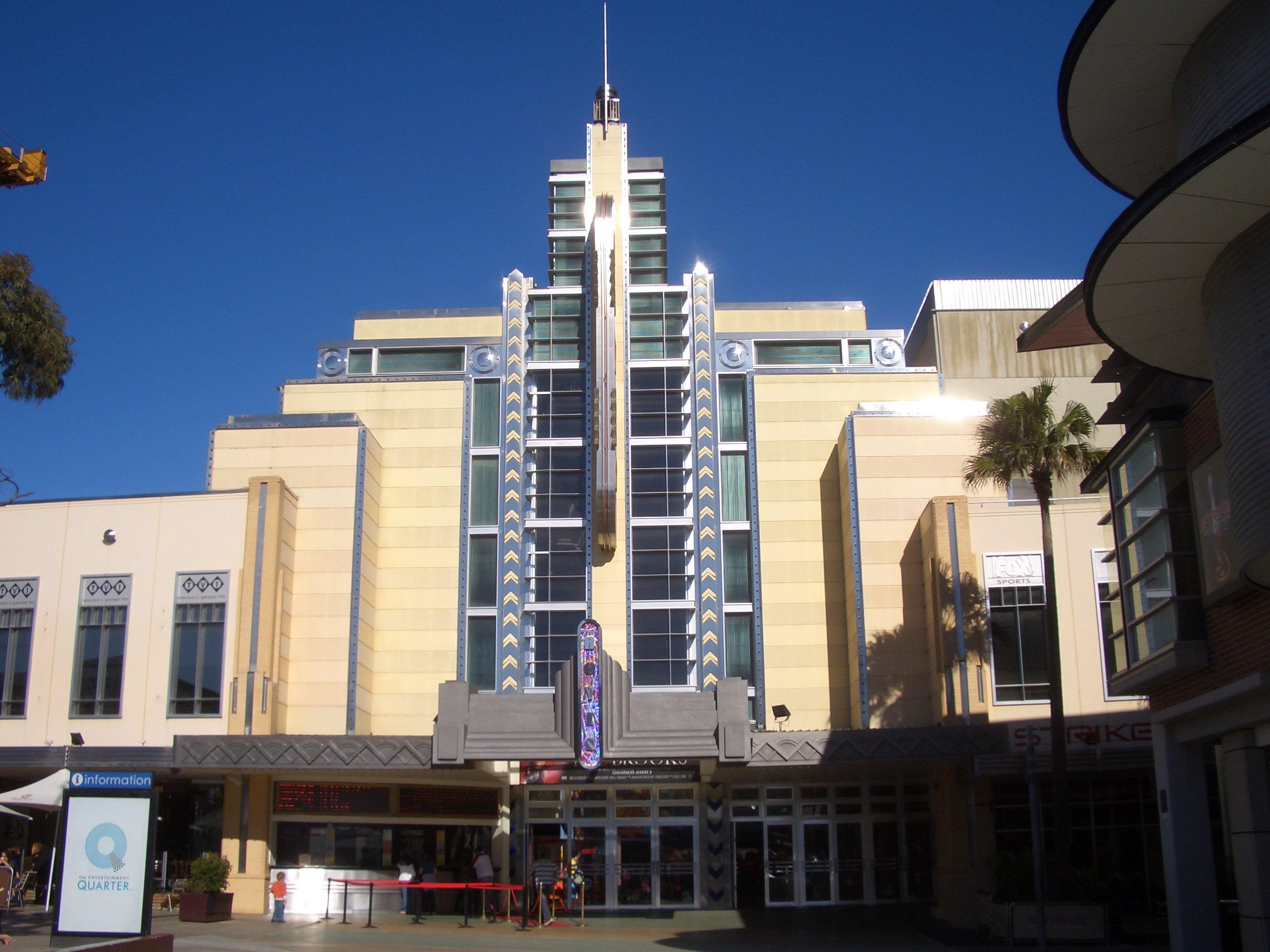
Cinemas, The Entertainment Quarter

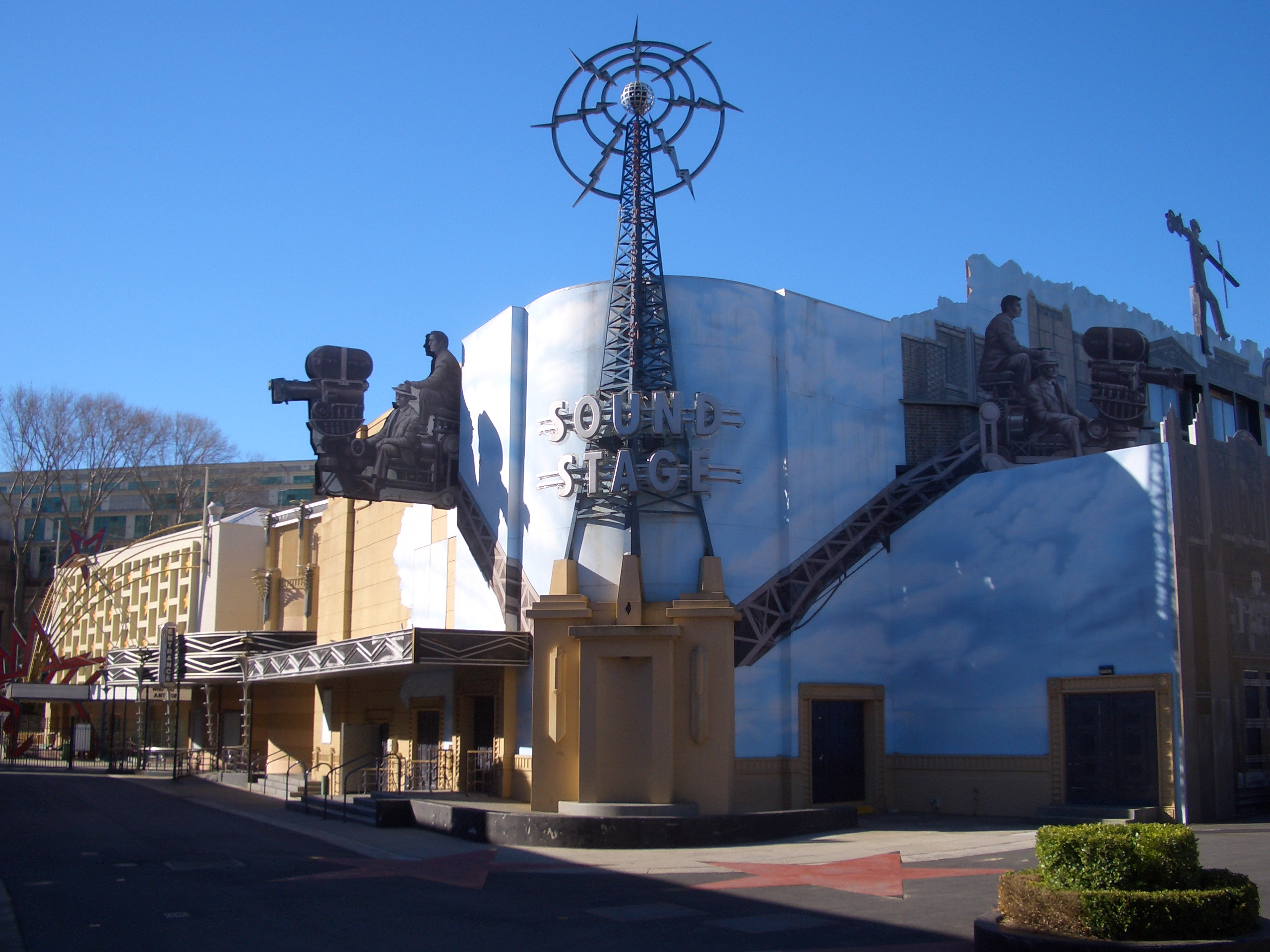
Disney Studios Australia

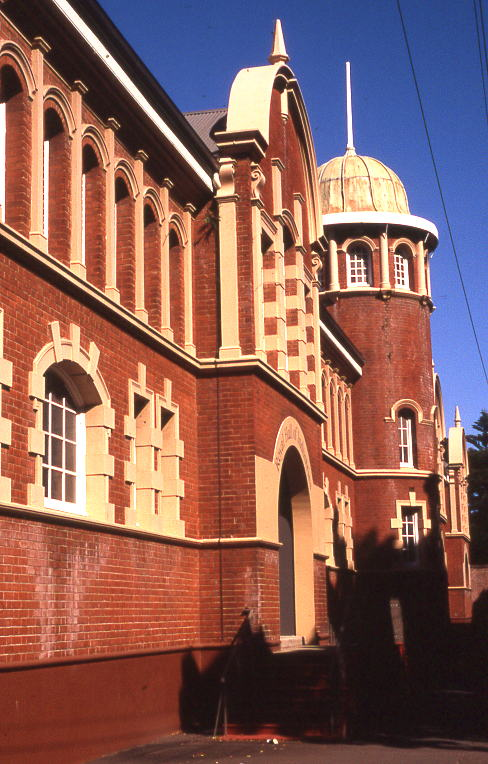
Royal Hall of Industries, Driver Avenue

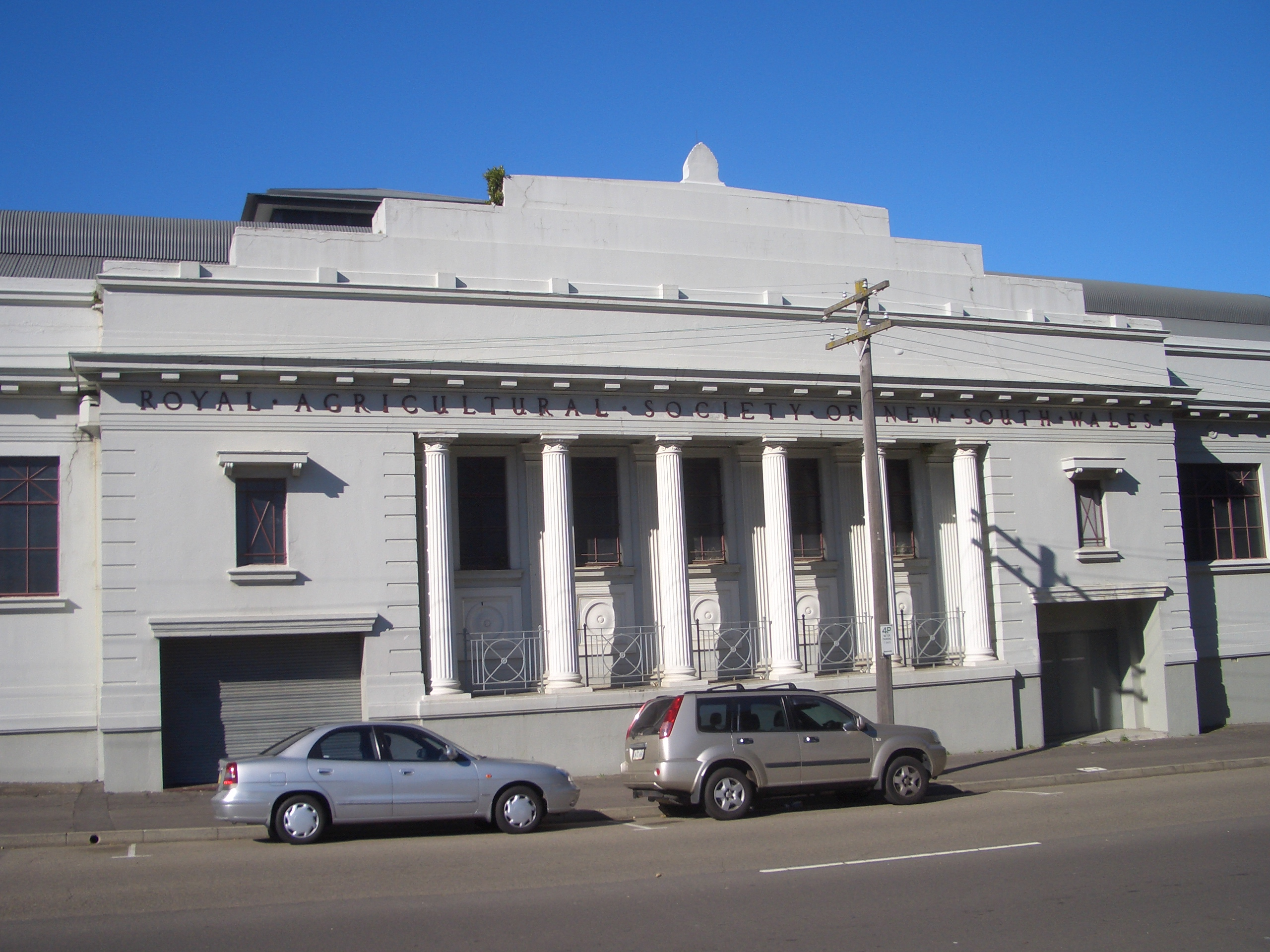
Hordern Pavilion

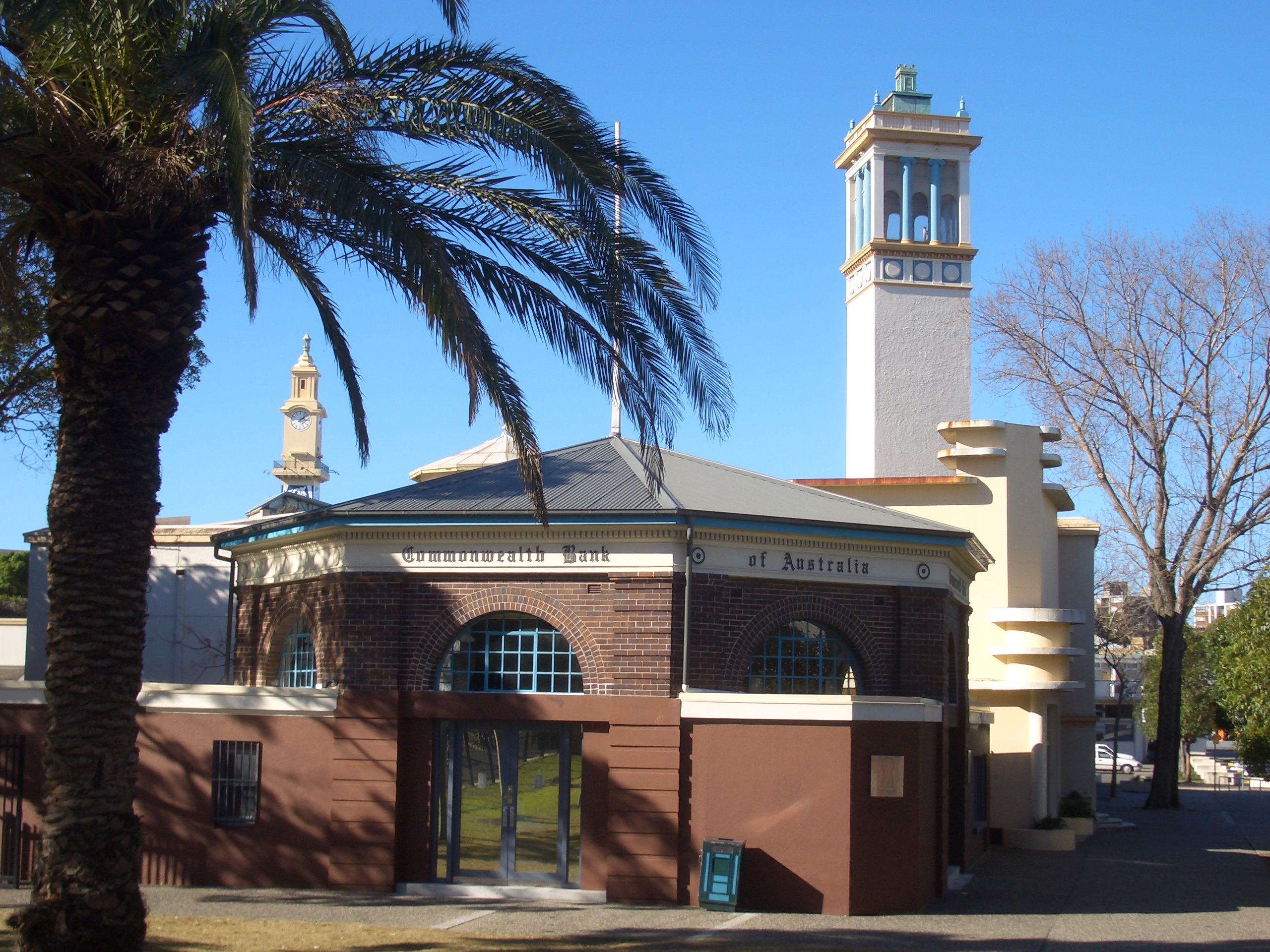
Sydney Showground (Moore Park)

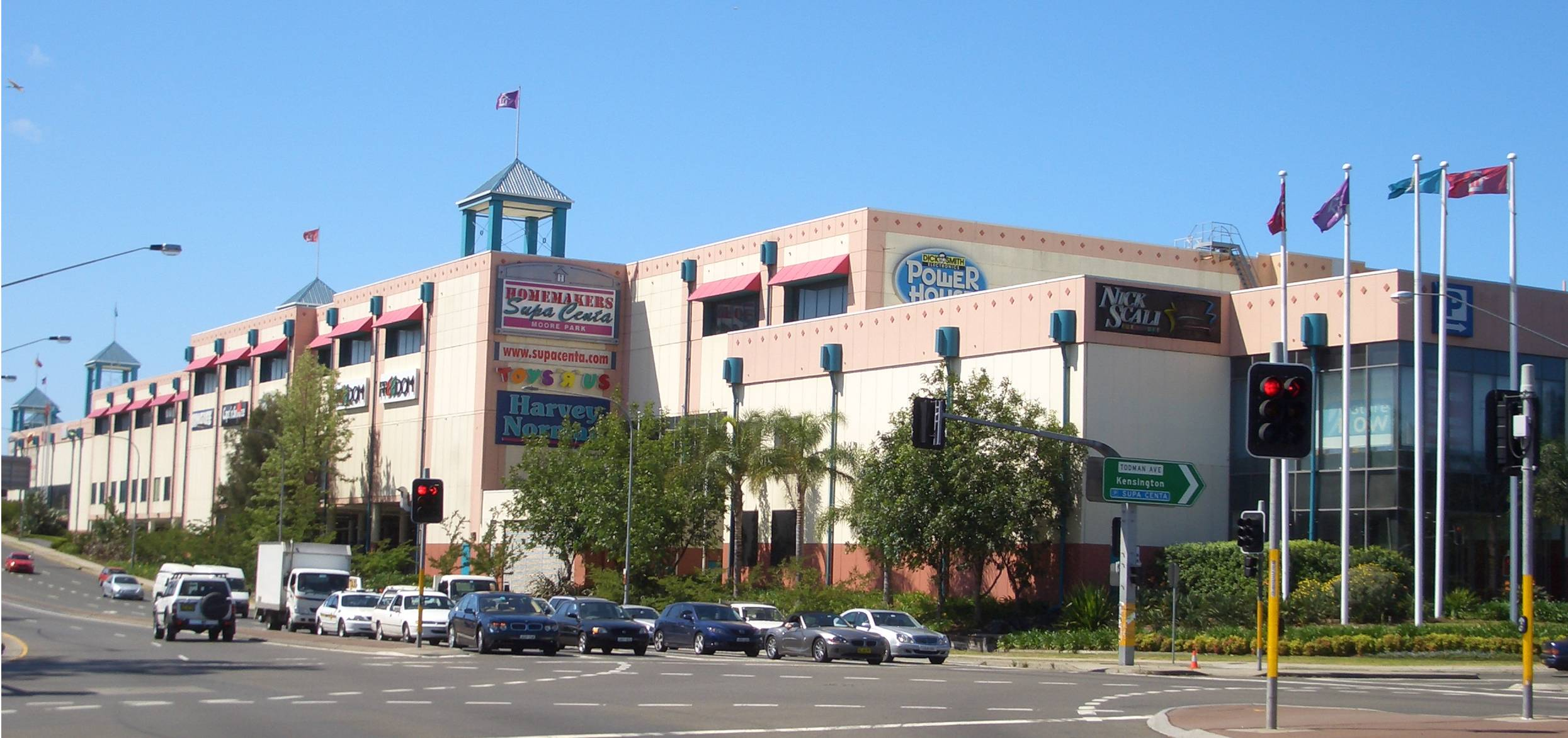
Moore Park Supa Centre

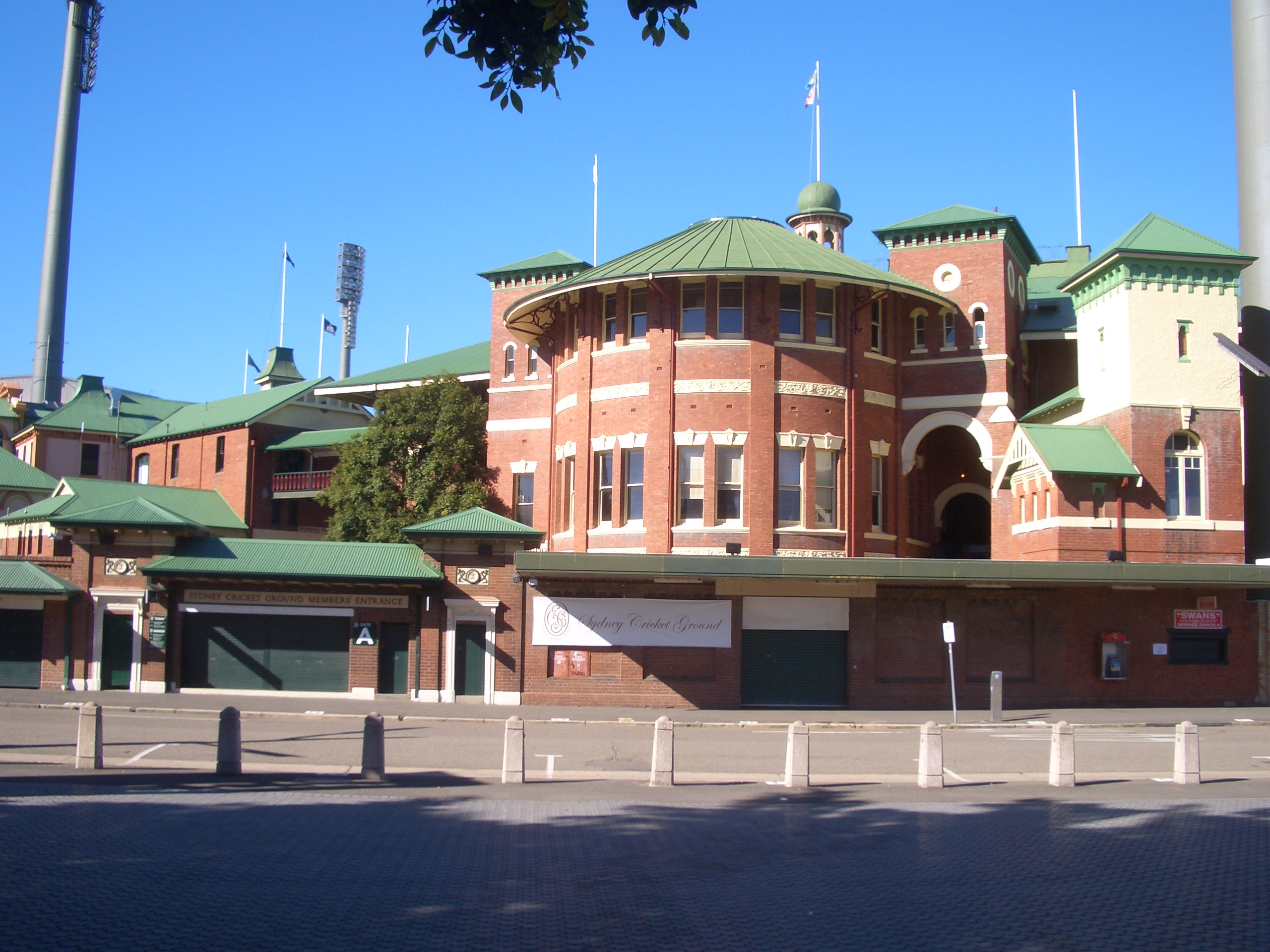
Sydney Cricket Ground entrance

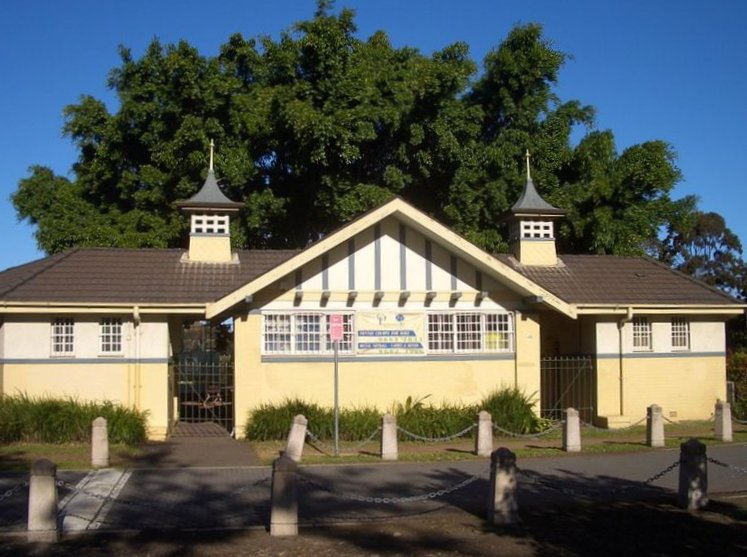
Moore Park Tennis Complex

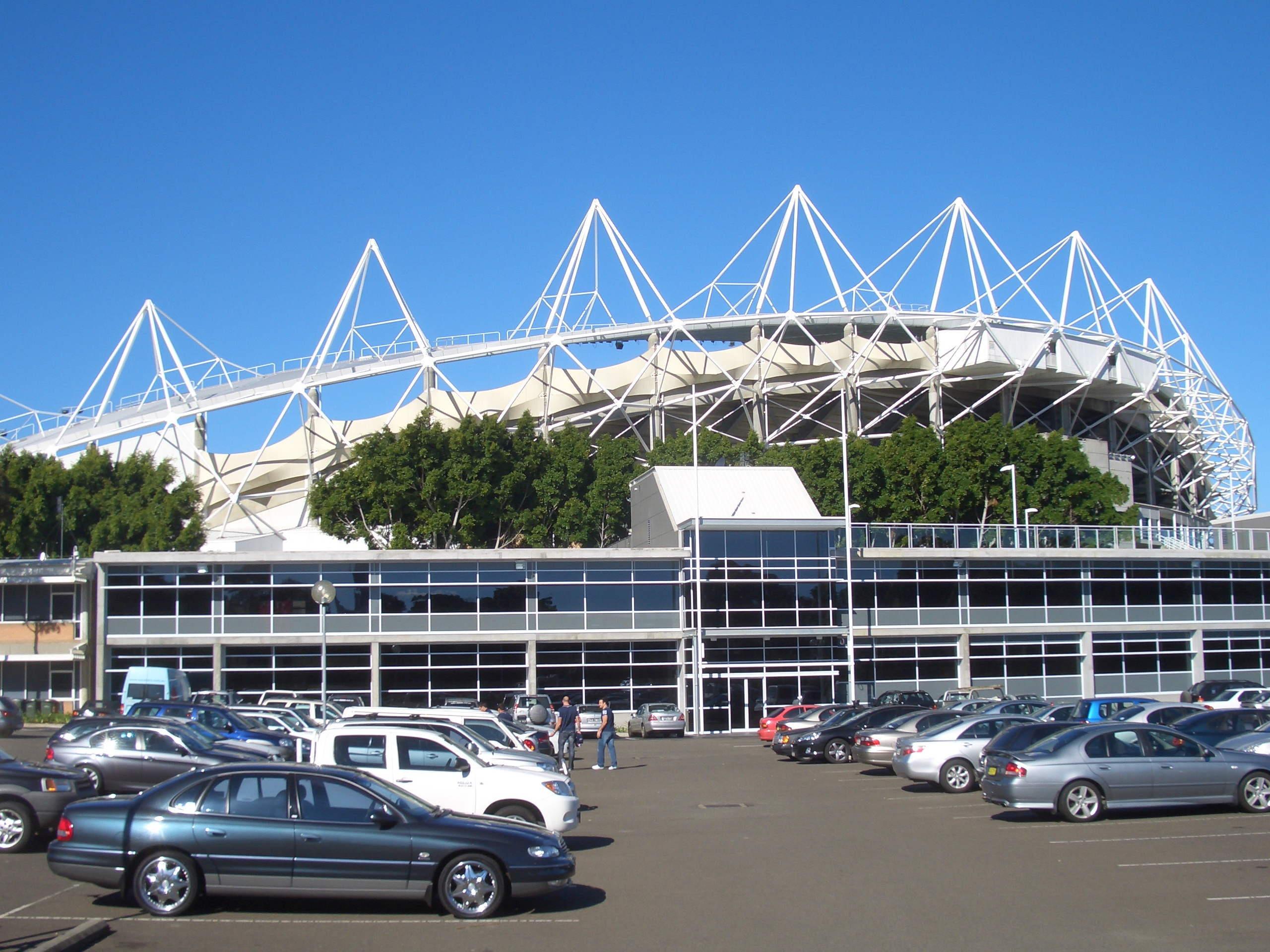
Sydney Football Stadium from carpark
