= Sydney Cricket Ground Members' Stand and Lady Members' Stand =

Heritage listed grandstands

Sydney Cricket Ground Members‘ Stand and Lady Members‘ Stand
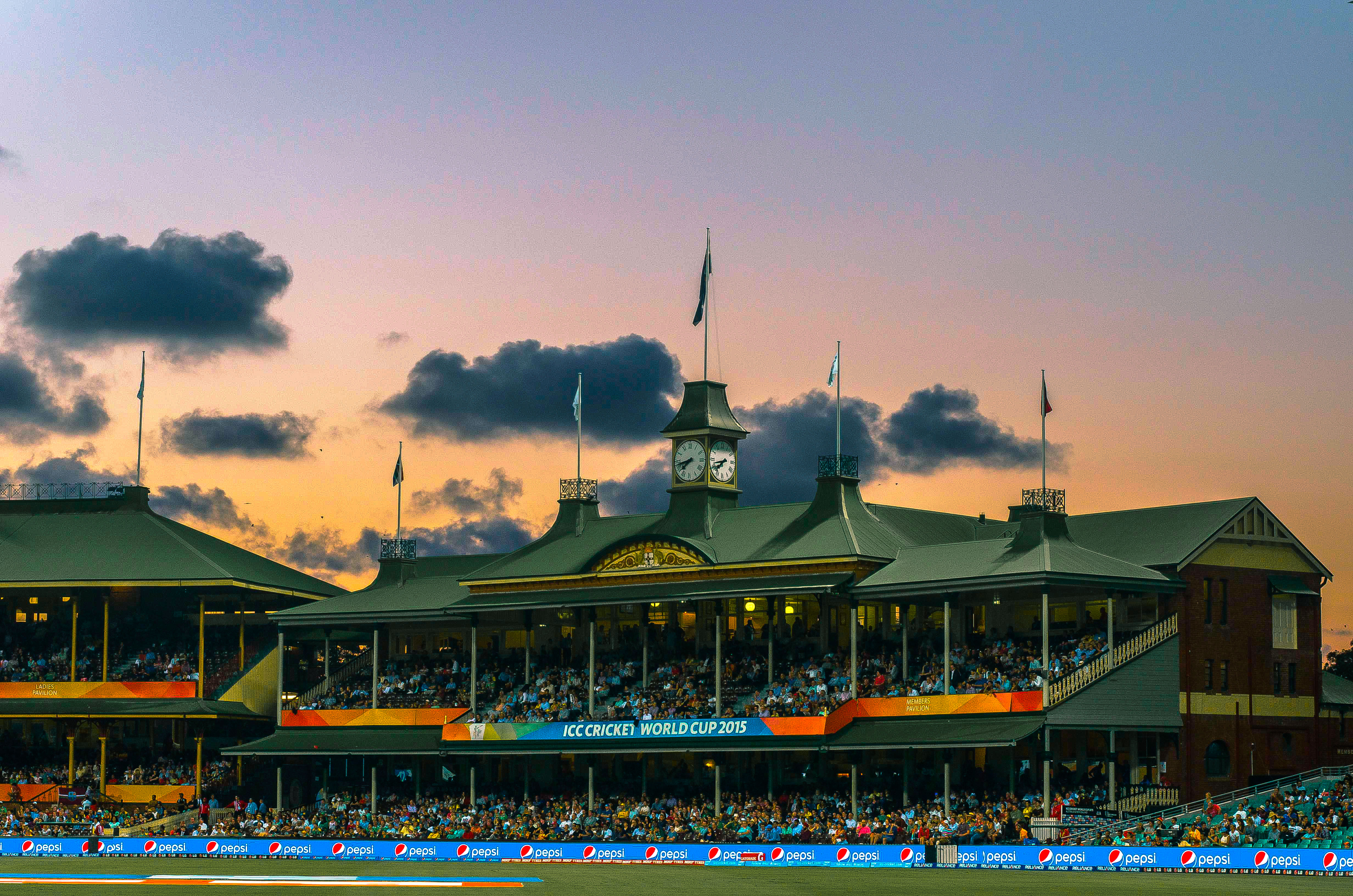
- The Members’ Stand at the 2015 ICC World Cup. The Ladies’ Stand is partially shown, at left.

- Location within Sydney Location within Australia
- 33.8909°S 151.2246°E
- Location: Driver Avenue, Moore Park, City of Sydney, New South Wales, Australia

History
- Built: 1886 & 1896

Site notes
- Area: Sydney City Council
- Architect: John Kirkpatrick
- Owner: Sydney Cricket and Sports Ground Trust

New South Wales Heritage Register
- Official name: Sydney Cricket Ground – Members Stand and Lady Members Stand
- Type: State heritage (built)
- Designated: 2 April 1999
- Reference no.: 353
- Type: Grandstand
- Category: Recreation and Entertainment

The Members’ Stand and Lady Members’ Stand at the Sydney Cricket Ground are two heritage-listed grandstands located at Driver Avenue in the inner eastern Sydney suburb of Moore Park in the City of Sydney local government area of New South Wales, Australia. It was designed by J. Kirkpatrick and built from 1900. The property is owned by the Sydney Cricket and Sports Ground Trust, an agency of the Government of New South Wales. It was added to the New South Wales State Heritage Register on 2 April 1999.

The area occupied by the stands were previously Aboriginal land, a water reserve, community facility, showground, and cricket ground.

== History ==
In 1811 Governor Macquarie proclaimed Sydney’s second Common, an area of 405 hectares (1,000 acres).

The establishment of the Sydney Cricket Ground dates from 1854 when matches were played there by members of the military from Victoria Barracks. From 1876 all major cricket matches were played at these grounds. The earliest grandstands date from around the turn of the century when four grandstands were constructed. Of these, only the Members Stand and the Lady Members Stand survive.

The Members’ Stand, a large two level grandstand was constructed c. 1886 and designed by architect, John Kirkpatrick. The stand incorporates an earlier three storey stuccoed brick club room at the rear. The original Members’ Stand was built in 1878 in the north west corner where the current Members‘ Stand now sits. The Members’ Stand was rebuilt on its current site at a cost of £6,625.

On 3 May 1896 the foundation stone of the Lady Members’ Stand was set by Viscountess Hampden, Susan Henrietta Cavendish, wife of the then NSW Governor Henry Brand, 2nd Viscount Hampden. The completed stand was opened later that same year, along with a concrete cycling track which circled the inside of the ground. Like the Members' Stand, the Lady Members' Stand, commonly called the Ladies' Pavilion, is an elegant two level grandstand constructed of cast iron and with an extensive three-storey members' room at the rear.

From 1920 to 1937, the dominant visual elements of the (adjacent) Sydney Showground complex by this time were the peripheral walls, the iconic Members’ Stand clock tower, and tower of the Anthony Hordern Building.

== Description ==
Timber, brick and cast iron column and truss grandstands with ornate cast iron balustrades and green painted corrugated iron roofs. The stands are accessed via Gate A located on Driver Avenue.

== Heritage listing ==
As at 1 September 2000 the stands have consistency of form and detail and are possibly the finest examples of their type in New South Wales.

The Sydney Cricket Ground Members' Stand and Lady Members' Stand was listed on the New South Wales State Heritage Register on 2 April 1999.
