= The Barefoot Rugby League Show =

- Genre: Sport-variety
- Presented by: Brad Cooke; Tony Currie; David Peachey
- Country of origin: Australia
- Original language: English
- No. of seasons: 3
- No. of episodes: 500

Production
- Production locations: Sydney, Australia
- Running time: 90–120 minutes (including commercials)

Original release
- Network: National Indigenous Television
- Release: 2008 – present

Related
- The Marngrook Footy Show

The Barefoot Rugby League Show is an Australian sports variety television programme, shown on NITV, as well as 31 Brisbane. Hosted by Brad Cooke and indigenous former international rugby league footballers Tony Currie and David Peachey, the programme is filmed at Fox Studios Australia in Sydney.
