= Sydney Royal Easter Show =

Annual Easter show held in Sydney, Australia

- Begins: 19 March 2027
- Ends: 30 March 2027
- Frequency: Annual
- Location: Sydney Showground
- Inaugurated: 1823
- Most recent: 2 April - 13 April 2026
- Attendance: 922,827 (2017)
- Organiser: Royal Agricultural Society of New South Wales
- Website: www.eastershow.com.au

The Sydney Royal Easter Show, commonly shortened to The Easter Show or The Show, is an annual show held in Sydney, Australia over two weeks around the Easter period. First held in 1823, it comprises an agricultural show, an amusement park and a fair and combines the elements of each, showcasing the judging of livestock and produce. The Royal Agricultural Society of New South Wales is responsible for the event. Queen Victoria awarded the society and its show the right to use the word "Royal" in its name.

The main purpose of the show is specifically to encourage agriculture; although other aspects of the show have developed including competitions, entertainment and commerce, the display of the products of rural industry remain of major importance, the RAS claiming 30,000 rural exhibits in 2007.

The Show is a celebration of Australian culture, from rural traditions to modern day lifestyles, providing unique experiences for attendees. Every Easter, the country and city join together at Sydney Showground, Sydney Olympic Park, for twelve days of agricultural competitions, animal experiences, live entertainment, carnival fun, shopping and more. Attendance levels have continued to grow consistently year on year. Statistically, the busiest day of the show is the last Saturday, often having 39% higher attendance than any other day.

The Show has many competitions, including arts and crafts, photography and cookery, as well as tests of strength and skill such as wood chopping. The show also has shopping, restaurants, commercial stands, such as a showbag pavilion and exhibits, a horticultural display, and stage and arena shows. It also even hosts a breed based conformation dog show and cat show, which are nationally accredited.

== History ==
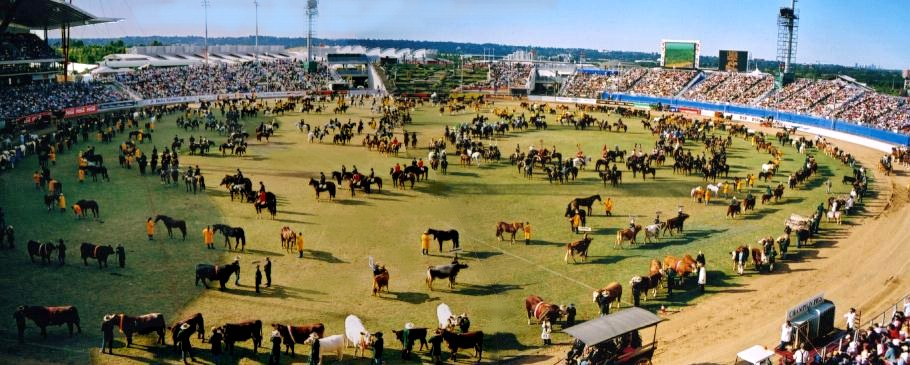
The Grand Parade at the showground at Sydney Showground Stadium

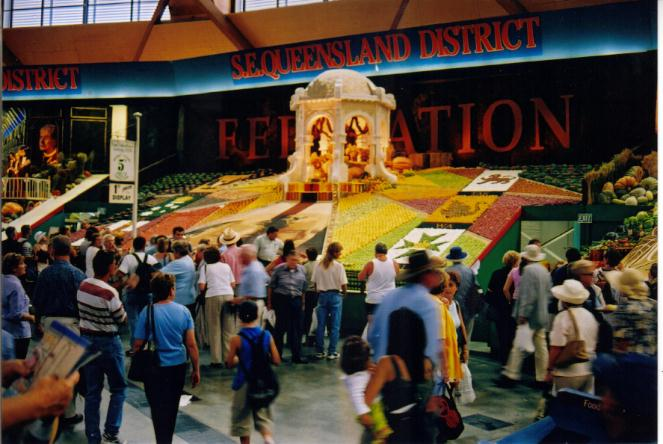
The District Exhibits are one of the most popular sights at the show. In 2001 the South East Queensland District won First Prize for Display, celebrating the Federation of Australia

The Sydney Royal Easter Show is the largest ticketed event held in Australia and one of the largest in the world. The Royal Agricultural Society of New South Wales (formed a year before the event) held its first Show in 1823. Its initial purpose was of encouraging the colony's rural industries. The site was at Parramatta Park, 24 km (14.9 mi) west of the town of Sydney. It initially showcased horses, cattle, sheep, pigs, and poultry.

In 1869, the event moved from Parramatta to Prince Alfred Park. In 1881, the Government of New South Wales provided land for the Royal Agricultural Society at Moore Park; the show was held at that venue for the next 116 years. In 1998, the event moved to a new showground within the Sydney Olympic Park precinct at Homebush Bay. The former Sydney Showground at Moore Park has since become Fox Studios Australia, with associated development known as The Entertainment Quarter.

The show since continued uninterruptedly after 1869, except in 1919 (during the Spanish flu outbreak), the years of 1942 to 1946 (during World War II) and 2020 (during the COVID-19 pandemic). It originally started on the Friday before Easter and ended on the Tuesday following Easter (with closures on Sundays and Good Friday). The Thursday before Easter is termed Children's Day and goods such as discounted show bags are on sale.

Yielding to pressure from the public, the show later began to be opened on Sundays and Good Friday. With the move to Homebush Bay, the show was extended to 16 days. In 2000 it was reduced to 14 days. In 2007, a revised program took into account changes to NSW School Holidays, the show commencing on the Thursday before Good Friday in order to increase the holiday time for families to attend. In 2017 over 922,000 people attended the show, when about 850,000 were expected. The previous record was 964,000 in 2004. In 2018, the show returned to its traditional 12 days. If Easter falls in March the show is held outside of school holidays.

The 2021 show ran from 1 to 12 April, under some restrictions due to the COVID-19 pandemic in Australia. Attendee numbers were reduced to 60,000 a day to allow maintenance of 1.5 m (4 ft 11.06 in) distancing as well as separate pavilion entries and exits monitored by COVID marshals, maintenance of distancing in queues, and caps on the number of people in arena, pavilions and stands. Venue cleaning was also increased. Attendance was about 800,000. (Inclusive of ticket holders, agricultural and commercial exhibitors, staff, volunteers and other show workers). No cases of COVID-19 were associated with the show.

The 2022 show was held from 8 to 19 April. It was officially opened by the Princess Royal.

=== Incidents ===
On 10 April 2022, the organisers of the show closed one of the rides after the operator failed to secure the four-year-old boy who was on one of the rides on Sunday. It was found via social media that the children on the ride were restrained except for the boy.

The next night on 11 April 2022, a 17-year-old boy was stabbed to death at 8:00pm in the adult carnival area of the show whilst working at the Sydney Royal Easter Show. That night, a 16-year-old was also stabbed and suffered a leg injury. It was subsequently revealed that police had arrested the people who were involved in this incident.

== Pricing ==
In 2016 a "twilight ticket' was introduced, giving showgoers a budget friendly opportunity to come to the show for a discounted price after 4pm.

Tickets for the show could be purchased online via Ticketmaster and from Woolworths where the pass included travel. Tickets were previously available at railway stations and on some buses; however since 2015 this option has been discontinued.

Tickets are only available for purchase online for specific days.

Annual memberships can be purchased for $172 for city residents, $124 for country residents, $98 for people aged 18-25.

== Transport ==
With only limited parking available, most people arrive by public transport. The closest train station is Olympic Park railway station. The event is classified as a major event by the State Government with Sydney Trains operating regular services from Central and Lidcombe. NSW TrainLink Blue Mountains Line and Bathurst Bullet services make an additional stop at Lidcombe for the duration of the show.

On weekends regular services operate to and from Penrith and Schofields along with a few Central Coast & Newcastle Line services from Newcastle Interchange and Wyong. The Olympic Park bus network also operates from various locations across Sydney.
