= Disney Studios Australia =

Australian film and television production facility owned by Disney (1998-present)

Coordinates: 33.89202°S 151.22851°E

- Formerly: Fox Studios Australia (1998–2022)
- Type: Subsidiary
- Industry: Film
- Founded: 1 May 1998; 28 years ago
- Headquarters: Building 16, 38 Driver Avenue, Moore Park, Sydney, New South Wales, Australia (Map)
- Parent: Fox Entertainment Group (1998–2019); Walt Disney Studios (2019–present)
- Website: www.disneystudiosaustralia.com

Disney Studios Australia (formerly known as Fox Studios Australia) is a motion picture and television production facility in Sydney that has operated as part of The Walt Disney Company since 2019.

Occupying the site of the former Sydney Showground at Moore Park, the studio was created in May 1998 by the now-defunct News Corporation, later split into 21st Century Fox, which Disney acquired in 2019.

The 32-acre-site, which is 15 minutes from the Sydney CBD, features eight sound stages, several production offices, workshops, and around 60 independent entertainment industry businesses.

The studio has been involved in the production of numerous major films, including The Matrix, Moulin Rouge!, Mission: Impossible 2, Star Wars Episodes II and III, Superman Returns, and Son of the Mask.

== Site history ==
Prior to 1998, the Studio's site was host to Sydney's Royal Easter Show – the largest event held in Australia, and the sixth largest in the world. In 1881, the New South Wales Government provided land for the Royal Agricultural Society at Moore Park where the show was held for 16 years. From 1902 to 1919, the site expanded to the south and from 1920 to 1937, the Moore Park Showground expanded to the north. In 1998, the Show moved to a new showground and the former Sydney Showground at Moore Park became the home to Fox Studios Australia.

The 132,000 square metre (32 acre) site includes eight stages, production offices and heavy industrial workshops, and a community of over 60 independent businesses. These businesses provide services such as equipment hire, travel and freight, casting, postproduction, and explosives/pyrotechnic factory, adjoining residential properties.

Disney Studios Australia houses post-production specialists in film editing, sound re-recording and sound.

== Backlot theme park ==
Fox Studios Backlot was purportedly based on Universal Studios Hollywood, Universal Studios Florida, and Disney's Hollywood Studios. The $261 million park opened on 7 November 1999. An adjacent precinct provides restaurants and cafes, a retail complex, parklands, entertainment venues, and sporting facilities. The adjacent precinct was previously known as simply 'Fox Studios Entertainment Precinct'. The backlot closed down in 2001 and the entrance remains at Fox Studios Australia.

== Ownership ==
Fox Studios Australia logo before Disney renamed the studio in 2022.

Disney Studios Australia is owned by the media conglomerate The Walt Disney Company, under the terms of a 99-year lease from the New South Wales State Government.

The decision by the Carr Government in 1995 to allow News Corporation, predecessor of 21st Century Fox, to take over the site was controversial and attracted criticism from sections of the media such as The Sydney Morning Herald and independent MP Clover Moore. It was alleged that a secret deal took place between the NSW Government and the largest shareholder and Chairman/CEO of News Corporation, Rupert Murdoch, involving the donation of $25 million in taxpayers' money for the new site.

On 20 March 2019, The Walt Disney Company completed its acquisition of 21st Century Fox, and now owns the studio, as well as 20th Century Studios and other related film units. On 10 October 2022, the studio dropped the "Fox" branding and was officially renamed Disney Studios Australia.

== Productions ==
The studio has been involved in a number of movies and television shows including:

=== Films ===
- Dark City (1998)
- Babe: Pig in the City (1998)
- Holy Smoke! (1999)
- The Matrix (1999)
- Mission: Impossible 2 (2000)
- Moulin Rouge! (2001)
- La Spagnola (2001)
- Star Wars: Episode II – Attack of the Clones (2002)
- The Quiet American (2002)
- The Matrix Reloaded (2003)
- Kangaroo Jack (2003)
- The Matrix Revolutions (2003)
- The Night We Called It a Day (2003)
- Star Wars: Episode III – Revenge of the Sith (2005)
- Son of the Mask (2005)
- Stealth (2005)
- Superman Returns (2006)
- Happy Feet (2006)
- Australia (2008)
- X-Men Origins: Wolverine (2009)
- Accidents Happen (2009)
- Tomorrow When the War Began (2010)
- A Few Best Men (2011)
- Happy Feet Two (2011)
- The Great Gatsby (2013)
- The Wolverine (2013)
- Unbroken (2014)
- The Water Diviner (2014)
- Mad Max: Fury Road (2015)
- Truth (2015)
- Gods of Egypt (2016)
- Better Watch Out (2016)
- Hacksaw Ridge (2016)
- Alien: Covenant (2017)
- 2:22 (2017)
- The Lego Ninjago Movie (2017)
- Bleeding Steel (2017)
- Peter Rabbit (2018)
- Pacific Rim Uprising (2018)
- Nekrotronic (2018)
- Ladies in Black (2018)
- I Am Woman (2019)
- Little Monsters (2019)
- The Invisible Man (2020)
- Penguin Bloom (2020)
- Peter Rabbit 2: The Runaway (2021)
- Shang-Chi and the Legend of the Ten Rings (2021)
- Thor: Love and Thunder (2022)
- Poker Face (2022)
- The Fall Guy (2024)
- Kingdom of the Planet of the Apes (2024)
- Furiosa: A Mad Max Saga (2024)
- I Know What You Did Last Summer (2025)
- Play Dirty (2025)
- The Deb (2026)
- Send Help (2026)
- Apex (2026)
- Street Fighter (2026)
- Spaceballs: The New One (2027)
- Extraction 3 (TBA)
- Greyhound 2 (TBA)
- Place to Be (TBA)
- R.U.R. (TBA)
- Starman (TBA)
- Supermax (TBA)

=== Television ===
- Farscape (Nine Network, 1999)
- Playhouse Disney (Seven Network, 2003–2008)
- Australian Idol (Network Ten, 2003–2009)
- Star Wars: Clone Wars (2003–2005)
- The Upside Down Show (2006)
- Star Wars: The Clone Wars (2008–2020)
- Hi-5 (Nine Network, 2008)
- The Barefoot Rugby League Show (NITV, 2010–2013)
- The X Factor (Seven Network, 2010–2016)
- Minute To Win It (Seven Network, 2010)
- Good News Week / Good News World (Network Ten, 2011)
- The Voice (Nine Network, 2012–2019; Seven Network, 2020–present)
- Young Talent Time (Network Ten, 2012)
- A League of Their Own (Network Ten, 2013)
- Move It (9Go!, 2014–2018)
- So You Think You Can Dance Australia (Network Ten, 2014)
- Star Wars Rebels (2014–2018)
- Shark Tank (Network Ten, 2015–2018)
- The Great Australian Spelling Bee (Network Ten, 2015–2016)
- You're Back in the Room (Nine Network, 2016)
- This Time Next Year (Nine Network, 2017–2019)
- Little Big Shots (Seven Network, 2017–2018)
- Dance Boss (Seven Network, 2018)
- All Together Now (Seven Network, 2018)
- Take Me Out (Seven Network, 2018)
- Blind Date (Network 10, 2018)
- Game of Games (Network 10, 2018)
- Dancing with the Stars (Network 10, 2019; Seven Network, 2024–present)
- Chris & Julia's Sunday Night Takeaway (Network 10, 2019)
- The Proposal (Seven Network, 2019)
- The Masked Singer Australia (Network 10, 2019–2023)
- Lego Masters Australia (Nine Network, 2022–present)

=== Special Thanks ===
- Legend of the Guardians: The Owls of Ga'Hoole (2010)

== See also ==
- List of film production companies
- List of television production companies
