= Sydney Cricket Ground Trust =

Former agency of the New South Wales Government

Sydney Cricket and Sports Ground Trust
- Merged into: Venues NSW
- Dissolved: 1 December 2020; 5 years ago
- Type: Government agency
- Location: The Sheridan Building, Driver Avenue, Moore Park, Sydney, New South Wales, Australia
- Coordinates: 33°53′S 151°13′E
- Services: Sydney Cricket Ground; Sydney Football Stadium
- Chairman: Tony Shepherd
- Deputy Chairman: Rod McGeoch
- Chief Executive Officer: Kerrie Mather
- Board of directors: Stephanie Brantz; Michael Crismale; David Gilbert; Nihal Gupta; John Hartigan; Peter Ivany; Alan Jones; Kerrie Mather; Maurice Newman; Barry O'Farrell; Katie Page; Phil Waugh
- Parent organization: Government of New South Wales
- Affiliations: Sydney City Roosters; New South Wales Rugby Union; Sydney Swans; Sydney FC; Sydney Cricket Club
- Website: www.sydneycricketground.com.au

The Sydney Cricket and Sports Ground Trust (popularly known as the Sydney Cricket Ground Trust or SCG Trust) was an agency of the Government of New South Wales that operated the Sydney Cricket Ground and Sydney Football Stadium in Sydney, New South Wales, Australia. It was merged into Venues NSW on 1 December 2020.

The SCG Trust operated the Sydney Cricket Ground (SCG) and Sydney Football Stadium (SFS), and former Sydney Sports Ground and SCG No.2 at Rugby League Tables at Moore Park in Sydney. In mid-2008, its head office The Sheridan Building opened, making it the third building to be built in the Gold Members Car Park, alongside the headquarters of Sydney City Roosters and New South Wales Rugby Union. These buildings were demolished during the 2018 redevelopment of the SFS. The headquarters of the National Rugby League and Rugby Australia remain adjacent to the 2022-opened Allianz Stadium.

In 2007 the UTS-Balmain club formed a partnership with the Sydney Cricket Ground Trust and are now known as Sydney CC or Sydney Cricket Club or just simply Sydney Tigers.

== Sculptures ==
Under former Chairman Rodney Cavalier, the Trust commissioned bronze sculptures to be placed around the grounds of the SCG and SFS. The sculptures were funded by Australian philanthropist Basil Sellers and the collection is known as the Basil Sellers SCG Sculpture Project.

Order	Date	Honouree	Sport, location	Notes
1	January 2008	Richie Benaud	Cricket, bowler	
2	30 March 2008	Dally Messenger	Rugby League, located outside of the SFS	
3	5 January 2009	Fred Spofforth	Cricket, fast bowler	
4	6 June 2009	Trevor Allan	Rugby union and rugby league footballer	
5	29 August 2009	Paul Roos	Australian rules football	
6	7 December 2009	Stephen Yabba Gascoign	Famous spectator	Located inside the grounds, taking over two seats on the concourse in front of the new Victor Trumper stand.
7	5 January 2010	Stan McCabe	Cricket, batsman	
8	9 August 2010	Reg Gasnier	Rugby league and rugby union	Part of the Basil Sellers Sports Sculpture project.
		Ken Catchpole	Rugby union	Relocated in 2017 to outside the Rugby Australia House
		Paul Kelly	Australian rules football	
		Steve Waugh	Cricket, batsman	
12	2016	Johnny Warren	Football	
13	3 January 2018	Betty Cuthbert and Marlene Mathews	Athletics	The first female athletes to be honoured.

== Media Hall of Honour ==
In 2014 the Sydney Cricket and Sports Ground Trust opened the Media Hall of Honour at the MA Noble Stand's media centre with fifteen inaugural inductees:

- Richie Benaud
- Ernet Black
- Ernie Christensen
- John Davis
- Jack Fingleton
- Ian Heads
- Frank Hyde
- Norman May
- Alan McGilvray
- Johnnie Moyes
- John O'Gready
- Bill O'Reilly
- Ray Robinson
- Jim Shepherd
- Ray Warren

== See also ==
- Business Events Sydney, responsible for promoting the Sydney Cricket Ground Trust & its properties
- Centennial Park & Moore Park Trust
