= Australian Subscription Television and Radio Association =

Industry lobbying organization

- Abbreviation: ASTRA
- Formation: September 1997
- Type: Peak organisation
- Purpose: Representing the subscription media industry in Australia
- Headquarters: 4 Broadcast Way, Artarmon, New South Wales
- Chairman: Tony Shepherd
- Website: www.astra.org.au

The Australian Subscription Television and Radio Association (ASTRA) is the peak industry body representing the subscription media industry in Australia. ASTRA's main activities are to represent the industry with government, regulators and the media, advocate policy reforms that promote industry growth, highlight and reward industry achievement, report television ratings and assist the industry to develop. ASTRA was formed in September 1997.

== Board of directors ==
ASTRA is managed by a representative board of directors. The board is chaired by Tony Shepherd AO, a former president of the Business Council of Australia. Also on the ASTRA Board are Ian Davis, Patrick Delany, Jacqui Feeney, Anthony Fitzgerald, Angelos Frangoupoulos, Richard Freudenstein, Lynette Ireland, Bruce Meagher, Mandy Pattinson, Jon Penn, Ben Richardson and Robi Stanton. ASTRA's chief executive officer, Andrew Maiden, is an ex-officio member of the board.

== Members ==
ASTRA members are subscription-based television viewing platforms, independent content providers, technology and communications companies, and organisations from the industries that support subscription media in Australia.

Members include platforms Foxtel and more than 20 independent content providers including the major international channel groups Fox Sports, BBC Worldwide Channels, ESPN, The Walt Disney Company, Fox International Channels, Discovery Networks Asia Pacific, NBC Universal, as well a number of technology companies and service providers.

Membership is open to all organisations and individuals wishing to support the development of the Australian subscription media industry.

== Policy ==
ASTRA was formed soon after the arrival of subscription television in Australia to politically organise the industry and give it a voice in public debates about the regulation of media.

ASTRA's stated policy priorities are to: support the development of the subscription media industry; encourage the production of local content for Australian audiences; advocate an open, competitive market that encourages investment and innovation; ensure market intervention is minimal and fair to all participants; and lobby for all media organisations to access public resources on the same terms.

The organisation's most high-profile campaign is for the reform of anti-siphoning rules, a provision of the Broadcasting Services Act which regulates the manner in which certain sports broadcast rights may be purchased. The anti-siphoning list provides free-to-air television broadcasters with the exclusive opportunity to purchase the right to broadcast more than 1000 sporting events.

ASTRA also manages codes of practice that regulate program content and classification, advertising, privacy, subscriber service obligations and complaints procedures. The ASTRA Codes do not cover issues already the subject of licence conditions for subscription television licensees, including in relation to the broadcast of political material and election advertisements, advertisements relating to medicines and tobacco products, the broadcast of events on the anti-siphoning list, captioning levels and captioning quality, and restrictions on the broadcast of content classified above MA 15+.

== Investment and jobs ==
ASTRA conducts an annual survey of the subscription media industry's investment in local screen production, employment and contribution to gross domestic product. In 2014–15 the survey revealed that the industry invested more than $796 million in local content production, created 8370 jobs, and added $2.083 billion to GDP.

== Events ==
Between 2002 and 2015, ASTRA managed the annual ASTRA Awards for excellence in subscription television. The awards, which were judged by members of the creative industries, were issued for ten content genres, six individuals, and two channel groups. Past hosts and presenters included Australian television personalities Guiliana Rancic, Jennifer Hawkins, Molly Meldrum, Rove McManus, Deborah Hutton, David Speers, Anthony Callea, Charlotte Dawson, Claudia Karvan, Osher Gunsberg, Alex Perry, Sarah Murdoch, Ruby Rose and Lisa Wilkinson, as well as international personalities Joe Mangoniello (from True Blood) and Kristian Alfonso (from Days Of Our Lives). In November 2015, ASTRA announced it would no longer hold the ASTRAs, folding the awards into the annual AACTA Awards.

ASTRA manages an annual conference, an annual breakfast for women in television, along with networking events for women in the industry, awards for industry excellence, a graduate program in partnership with AFTRS, and a leadership program.

== See also ==
- Subscription television in Australia
- ASTRA Awards
- Television in Australia
- Anti-siphoning laws in Australia
