= List of high commissioners of Australia to Niue =

High Commissioner of Australia to Niue

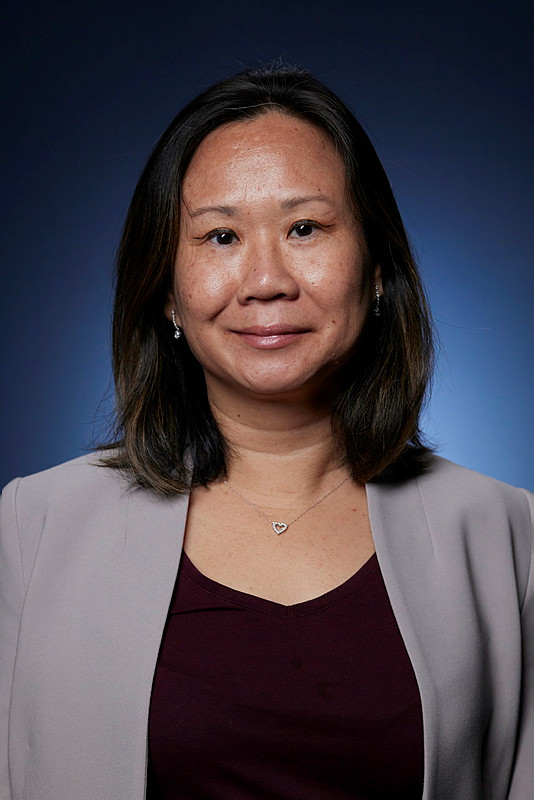
- Incumbent; Olivia Phongkham since 23 October 2024
- Department of Foreign Affairs and Trade
- Style: Her Excellency
- Reports to: Minister for Foreign Affairs
- Residence: Alofi
- Nominator: Prime Minister of Australia
- Appointer: Governor General of Australia
- Inaugural holder: Michael Potts (Non-resident High Commissioner)
- Formation: 2014
- Website: Australian High Commission, Alofi

The high commissioner of Australia to Niue is an officer of the Australian Department of Foreign Affairs and Trade and the head of the High Commission of the Commonwealth of Australia in Niue. The position has the rank and status of an ambassador extraordinary and plenipotentiary and the high commissioner resides in Alofi. The high commissioner, since February 2022, is Louise Ellerton.

== Posting history ==
On 27 February 2014 Australia formally established diplomatic relations with Niue, a self-governing state since 1974 in free association with New Zealand, with the non-resident high commissioner in Wellington also serving as high commissioner to Niue. In November 2018, Prime Minister Scott Morrison announced an expansion of Australia's diplomatic representation to all members of the Pacific Islands Forum, including opening new high commissions in the Cook Islands and Niue. The first resident high commissioner, Susan Allen, took office in Alofi on 26 August 2020.

== Heads of mission ==
#	Officeholder	Residency	Term start date	Term end date	Time in office	Notes
1	Michael Potts	Wellington, New Zealand	27 April 2014	January 2016	1 year, 8 months	
2	Peter Woolcott	Wellington, New Zealand	28 January 2016	1 August 2017	1 year, 185 days	
−	Andrew Cumpston (Acting)	Wellington, New Zealand	1 August 2017	14 February 2018	197 days	
3	Ewen McDonald	Wellington, New Zealand	14 February 2018	2 March 2019	1 year, 16 days	
4	Patricia Forsythe	Wellington, New Zealand	2 March 2019	26 August 2020	1 year, 177 days	
5	Susan Allen	Alofi	26 August 2020	November 2021	1 year, 2 months	
6	Louise Ellerton	Alofi	February 2022	Incumbent	4 years, 9 months	

== See also ==
- Australia–New Zealand relations
- Foreign relations of Niue
- Foreign relations of Australia
