= Patricia Forsythe =

Australian politician

The Honourable Patricia Forsythe AM
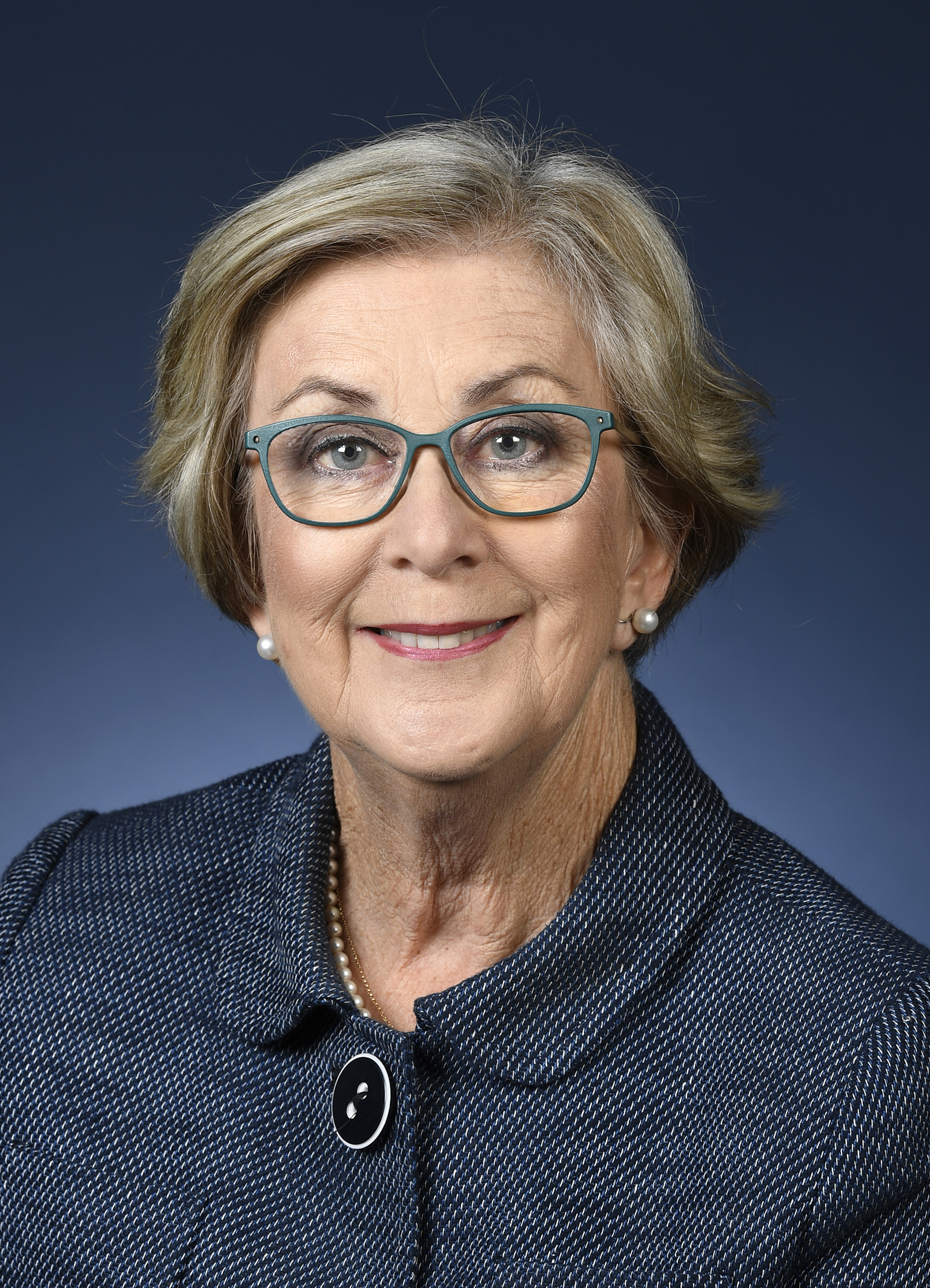

Australian High Commissioner to New Zealand
- In office 2 March 2019 – 31 March 2022
- Preceded by: Ewen McDonald
- Succeeded by: Harinder Sidhu

Executive Director of Sydney Business Chamber
- In office September 2006 – March 2019
- Preceded by: Margy Osmond
- Succeeded by: Katherine O'Regan

Member of the New South Wales Legislative Council
- In office 25 May 1991 – 22 September 2006
- Succeeded by: Matthew Mason-Cox

Personal details
- Born: Patricia Wingrove; 1 March 1952 (age 74) Newcastle, New South Wales, Australia
- Party: Liberal Party
- Education: University of Newcastle; Graduate School of Government at The University of Sydney

Patricia Forsythe AM (born 1 March 1952) is an Australian politician and diplomat who was the Australian High Commissioner to New Zealand from March 2019 to March 2022. As of 2024, she is Chancellor at the University of Newcastle. She was Executive Director of the Sydney Business Chamber from September 2006 to March 2019. Prior to her appointment to the Chamber, she was a member of the Legislative Council of New South Wales representing the Liberal Party between 1991 and 2006.

== Biography ==
Born in Newcastle, New South Wales, she received a Bachelor of Arts (Diploma of Education) from the University of Newcastle, Australia and became a high school teacher from 1974 to 1978 and 1983 to 1986. She had joined the Liberal Party in 1968, and served on the State Executive 1982-1991 and 1993–1995. After a period as a public affairs manager from 1987 to 1988, she was Executive Officer to the Minister for Local Government and Planning from 1988 to 1991.

== Political career ==
In 1991, Forsythe was elected to the New South Wales Legislative Council as a Liberal member. During her period in the Legislative Council, Forsythe spoke against moves by the Federal party and student Liberal organisations who were promoting voluntary student unionism In 2005, Forsythe expressed concern over the "extreme religious right" in the Liberal Party after the resignation and suicide attempt of then Liberal leader John Brogden. Forsythe named David Clarke as leader of the religious right.

Forsythe was challenged for preselection by Matthew Mason-Cox for the 2007 state election. However, she resigned on 22 September 2006 and took up appointment as Executive Director of the NSW Business Chamber. She was replaced by Mason-Cox in the Legislative Council.

== Life after politics ==
Forsythe is currently a member of the Council of Macquarie University, and serves on the boards of the Hunter Development Corporation, the Hunter Medical Research Institute, Business Events Sydney, the Anglican Board of Mission, and Cricket NSW. She has previously been a member of the National Trust, the Institute of Political Science, the Sydney Institute, Amnesty International, and Friends of La Perouse Museum.

On 1 March 2019 it was announced that Forsythe had been appointed the post of High Commissioner to New Zealand, despite having no previous diplomatic experience and the role being typically held by a career Department of Foreign Affairs officer. Forsythe served concurrently as non-resident High Commissioner to the Cook Islands and Niue until 2020, and completed her term as High Commissioner to New Zealand in March 2022.

Forsythe was appointed a Member of the Order of Australia in 2019 for significant service to business, and to the people and Parliament of New South Wales.

On 4 October 2023 the University of Newcastle announced the appointment of Forsythe as the university's next chancellor, replacing Paul Jeans. Forsythe's term as chancellor commenced on 1 January 2024.

Academic offices
Preceded by Paul Jeans	Chancellor of the University of Newcastle; 2024–current	Incumbent
Diplomatic posts
Preceded by Ewen McDonald	Australian High Commissioner to New Zealand; 2019–2022	Succeeded by Harinder Sidhu
New South Wales Legislative Council
Preceded by	Member of the New South Wales Legislative Council; 1991–2006	Succeeded by Matthew Mason-Cox
