= Sydney Football Stadium (1988) =

Former sports venue in South Sydney, Australia

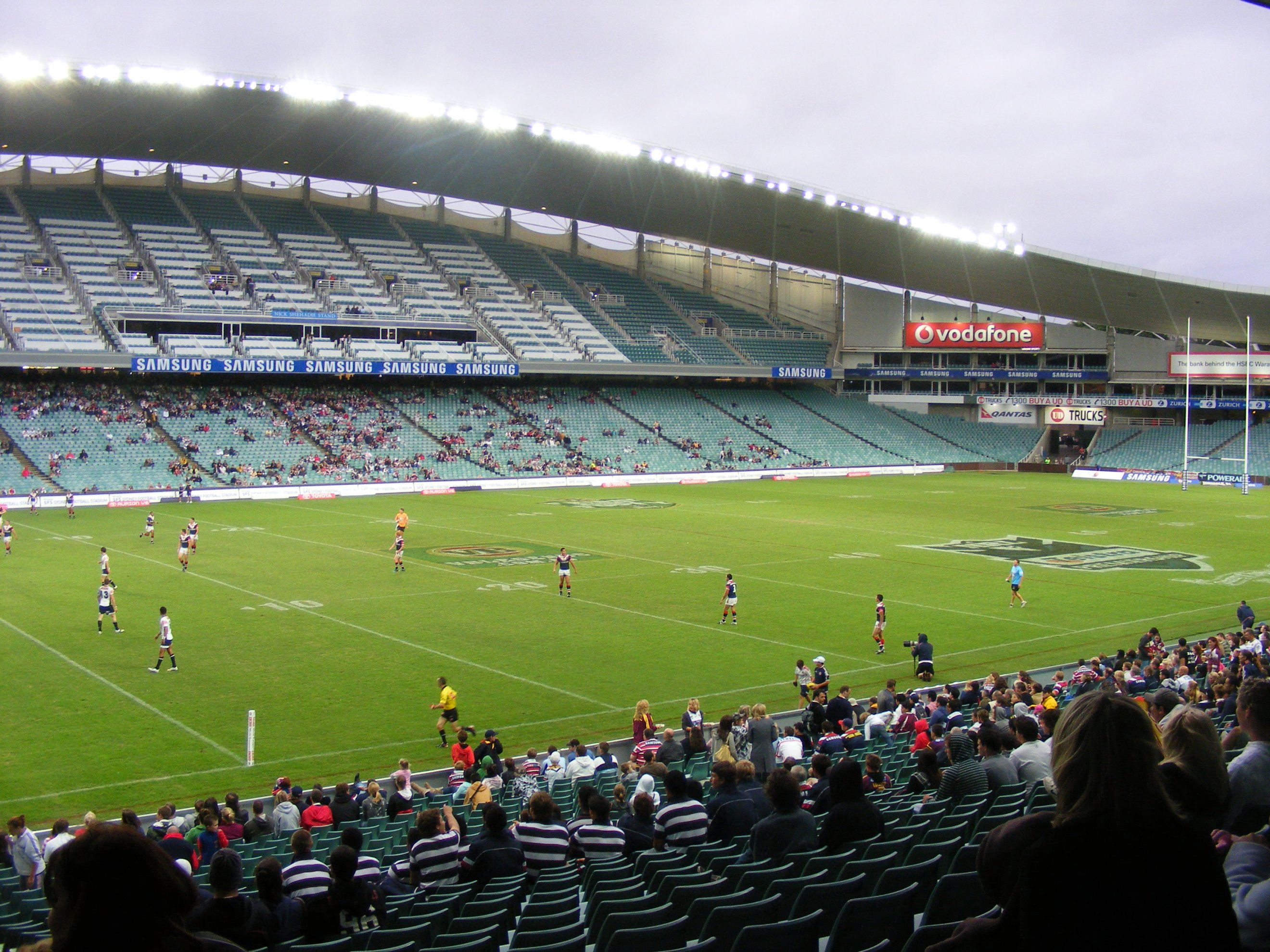
- Interactive map of Sydney Football Stadium
- Address: Driver Avenue; Moore Park; Australia
- Coordinates: 33°53′21″S 151°13′31″E
- Owner: Government of New South Wales
- Operator: Venues NSW
- Capacity: 45,500 (venue capacity); 44,000 (seated capacity)
- Executive suites: 65
- Surface: Grass
- Scoreboard: Yes
- Screen: Yes
- Record attendance: 44,380 – Sydney Roosters vs South Sydney Rabbitohs, 22 September 2018
- Field size: 140 metres × 79 metres

Construction
- Groundbreaking: 1986
- Opened: 24 January 1988; 38 years ago
- Closed: 5 October 2018; 8 years ago
- Demolished: 18 December 2019; 6 years ago
- Cost: $68 million
- Architects: Philip Cox; Richardson & Taylor

Tenants
- Rugby league Sydney Roosters (NRL) (1988–2018); South Sydney Rabbitohs (NRL) (1988–1999, 2002–2005); New South Wales rugby league team (1988–1998); St George Illawarra Dragons (NRL) (2000–2002); Wests Tigers (NRL) (2009–2013) Others New South Wales Waratahs (Super Rugby) (1996–2018); Sydney FC (A-League) (2005–2018); Australian Sevens (2016–2018)

The Sydney Football Stadium, commercially known as Allianz Stadium and previously Aussie Stadium, was a football stadium in the suburb of Moore Park in the Eastern Suburbs of Sydney, New South Wales, Australia. Built in 1988 next to the Sydney Cricket Ground, the stadium was Sydney's premier rectangular field venue for rugby league, rugby union and football.

Australia's national football teams, the Kangaroos, the Wallabies and the Socceroos occasionally played at the stadium, while the Sydney Roosters, NSW Waratahs, and Sydney FC were the ground's major tenants. The stadium usually held both National Rugby League semi finals and one preliminary final, and also held the annual pre-season Charity Shield football match between South Sydney and St George Illawarra for a number of years. It hosted all New South Wales Rugby League/Australian Rugby League rugby league grand finals, as well as the first grand final under the NRL banner, between 1988 and 1998.

The NSW Government announced plans in November 2017 for the stadium to be demolished and rebuilt. The stadium closed on 5 October 2018, with the last event being a Michael Bublé concert. Demolition began in early 2019, continuing after several legal challenges and becoming a major issue during the 2019 state election. It was replaced by the stadium of the same name opening on 28 August 2022.

== History ==
=== Background ===
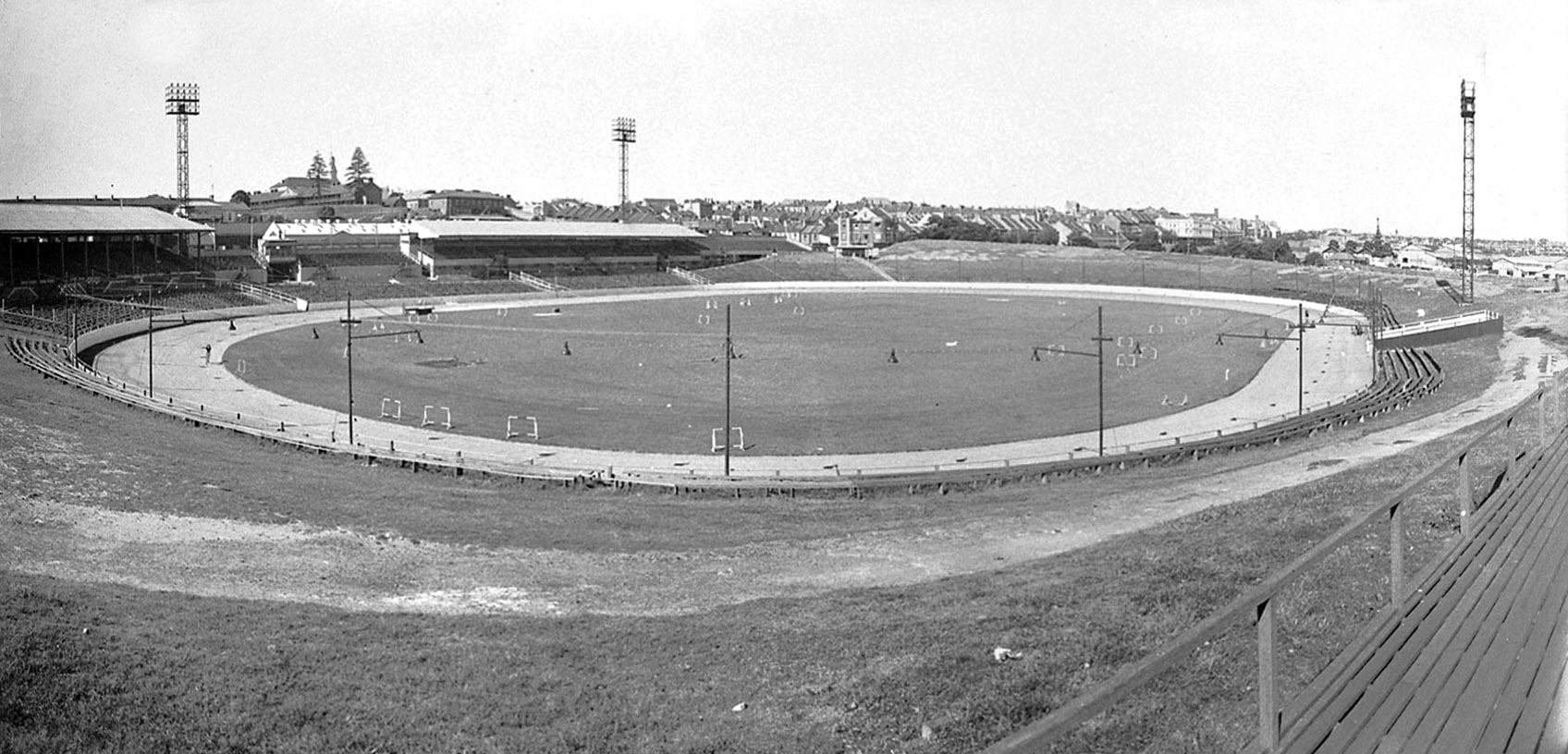
Sydney Sports Ground in 1937

Prior to its construction, major events were usually held at the Sydney Cricket Ground (SCG), as it was the largest stadium in Sydney. Although it was used many times for such events, the SCG's oval shape meant it was not ideal for sports like soccer, rugby league and rugby union that require a rectangular field.

The SFS was built upon the former Sydney Sports Ground in Moore Park, and the former SCG No 2 adjacent to the existing SCG. Both were owned by the Sydney Cricket & Sports Ground Trust. Designed by Cox Architecture, engineered by Ove Arup & Partners and built by Civil & Civic, it was officially opened by Premier Barrie Unsworth on 24 January 1988. The first sporting event was a rugby league match between the Eastern Suburbs Roosters and St George Dragons on 4 March 1988.

Its seating capacity was 41,159, but after numerous expansions, finally stood at 45,500. The record attendance for a sporting event was 44,380, set on 22 September 2018 at the last sporting event it ever held: the 2018 NRL Finals Series match between the Sydney Roosters and South Sydney Rabbitohs.

=== Usage ===
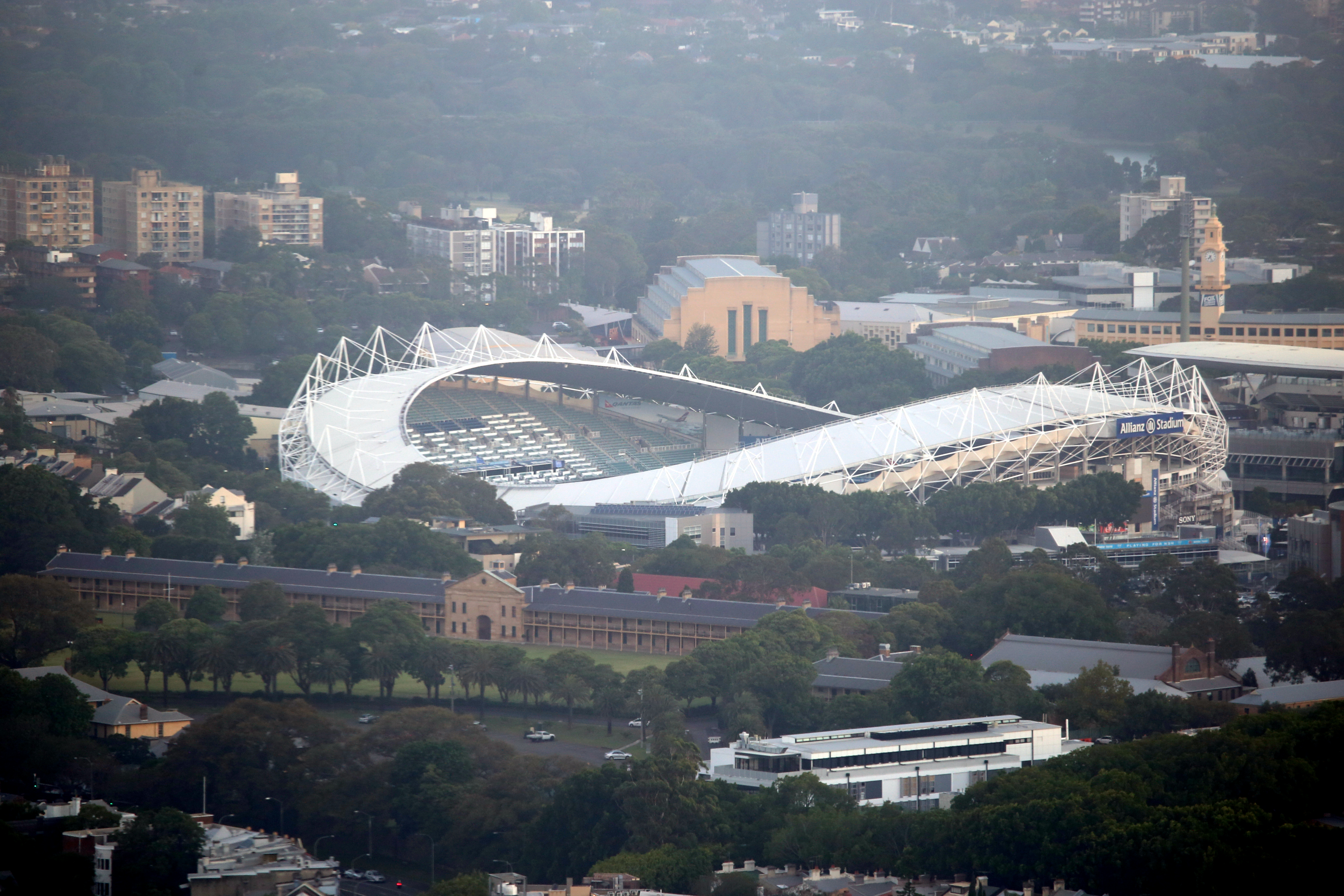
An aerial view of the stadium and its surrounds

The SFS was the Sydney Roosters' home ground from 1988. It was built on the site of the old Sydney Sports Ground which served as the Roosters home ground for decades, and the old SCG No 2 which served as a secondary ground for some state cricket matches, an additional training ground, and athletics. Both grounds were demolished in 1986 to make way for the SFS.

The first event held at the venue marked the beginning of the 1988 rugby league season, with a match between the then Eastern Suburbs Roosters and the St George Dragons on Friday 4 March 1988. St George won the game 24–14. The Roosters had to wait until Round 5 that season for their first win at the venue, defeating the Gold Coast Giants 28–10.

From 1988 to 1999 and from 2002 to 2005, it also served as the home ground for the South Sydney Rabbitohs. The Rabbitohs returned to the ground with a one-off game against the Brisbane Broncos in Round 25 of the 2015 NRL season.

The SFS has hosted rugby league football test matches since its opening in 1988 starting with two matches in Australia's 1988 Ashes series win against Great Britain. The first game of the series saw the Wally Lewis captained, Don Furner coached Australians christen their new Sydney home with a 17–6 win in front of 24,480 fans. That game was also the 100th test match between Australia and either Great Britain or England. The record international Rugby League crowd at the stadium was set for the first AshsGagainst Great Britain on their 1992 Australasian Tour when Australia won 22–6 in front of 40,141 in what was the first time a test in Sydney had attracted over 40,000 fans since 1974. The stadium has also hosted the Rugby League Tri-Nations, including the Final of the 2006 tournament in which Australia triumphed 16–12 over New Zealand in Golden point extra-time thanks to a try by captain Darren Lockyer.

Rugby league also had some memorable moments including: The first grand final in 1988 saw Canterbury-Bankstown defeat Balmain 24–12 in front of 40,000 fans to send former club captain Steve Mortimer into retirement with a Title win. The match had its controversial moment when Bulldogs Five-eighth Terry Lamb hit Tigers English import Centre Ellery Hanley with a high tackle out of the game before the 30th minute: The 1989 NSWRL Grand Final which was won by the Canberra Raiders over the Balmain Tigers 19-14 thanks to a try by replacement forward Steve Jackson in extra-time for their first premiership: The 1991 NSWRL Grand Final won by the Penrith Panthers over Canberra 19–12 in which Penrith's Royce Simmons scored 2 tries in his final match giving the Panthers their first title: Brisbane's maiden premiership with a 28–8 win over St. George in 1992 NSWRL grand final, highlighted by a 95-metre try to Broncos Centre Steve Renouf: and the 1997 ARL Grand Final between the Newcastle Knights and the Manly-Warringah Sea Eagles, with the Knights winning their first title with a 22–16 win following a try to Darren Albert in the dying seconds of the game after the Knights had trailed Manly since early in the game. Manly had won their previous 11 games against the Knights prior to that Grand Final.

The last grand final played at the SFS was the 1998 Final between Canterbury and Brisbane. In front of 40,857 fans, the Broncos ran out easy 38-12 winners to win their fourth premiership from four grand Final appearances.

Two standout State Of Origin matches in which Queensland triumphed over New South Wales with last-minute victories in 1994 and 1998, as well as Michael O'Connor's sideline conversion in driving rain for a NSW win in Game 2 of the 1991 series. Also of note was Queensland's backs to the wall win in Game 2 of the 1989. Despite losing Allan Langer to a broken leg, Mal Meninga with a fractured eye socket and Paul Vautin with an elbow injury in the first half, plus losing winger Michael Hancock to a shoulder injury in the second half, the Maroons triumphed 16–12 to wrap up the series. It was also found out after the game that Queensland's lock forward Bob Lindner had played most of the second half with a fractured ankle.

The SFS has been the venue of some of Australian sport's greatest matches and moments. The final of the 1993 World Youth Cup between Brazil and Ghana was also held at the SFS, Brazil winning 2–1. The 1994 FIFA World Cup qualifier between Australia and Argentina featuring Argentine association football legend Diego Maradona, finishing in a 1–1 draw with goals to Aurelio Vidmar for Australia and Abel Balbo for Argentina. Despite the grounds increase in capacity since 1993, this match retains the record sporting attendance at the SFS and many more were actually in attendance as the gates were thrown open close to kick-off as a safety measure.

It was used as the venue for the 2000 Summer Olympics Women's association football gold medal match between Norway and the United States. Norway defeated the USA 3–2 in front of 22,848 fans.

In 2002, the naming rights were purchased by Aussie Home Loans in a 5-year + 5-year deal. Due to this, the stadium was renamed Aussie Stadium. On 7 July 2007 the stadium reverted to its original Sydney Football Stadium name after Aussie Home Loans elected not to extend the naming rights deal.

In 2003, the SFS hosted several matches in the Rugby World Cup: (Ireland v Namibia), (Argentina v Romania), (Scotland v Fiji), (South Africa v Georgia), (Georgia v Uruguay; this match was notable for attracting a crowd of 28,576, despite the low profiles of both teams).

In 2007 the Sydney Roosters High Performance Centre and Administrative departments set up their headquarters at the SFS.

The 2008 Rugby League World Cup's opening ceremony and Group A match between Australia and New Zealand was played at the Stadium. The SFS also hosted one game from the knockout stage: the second semi-final between Australia and Fiji.

In 2012, Allianz secured the naming rights to the SFS with the venue rebranded as Allianz Stadium.

In 2018, the SFS hosted one of three AFL pre-season mini competitions called AFLX.

=== Redevelopment ===
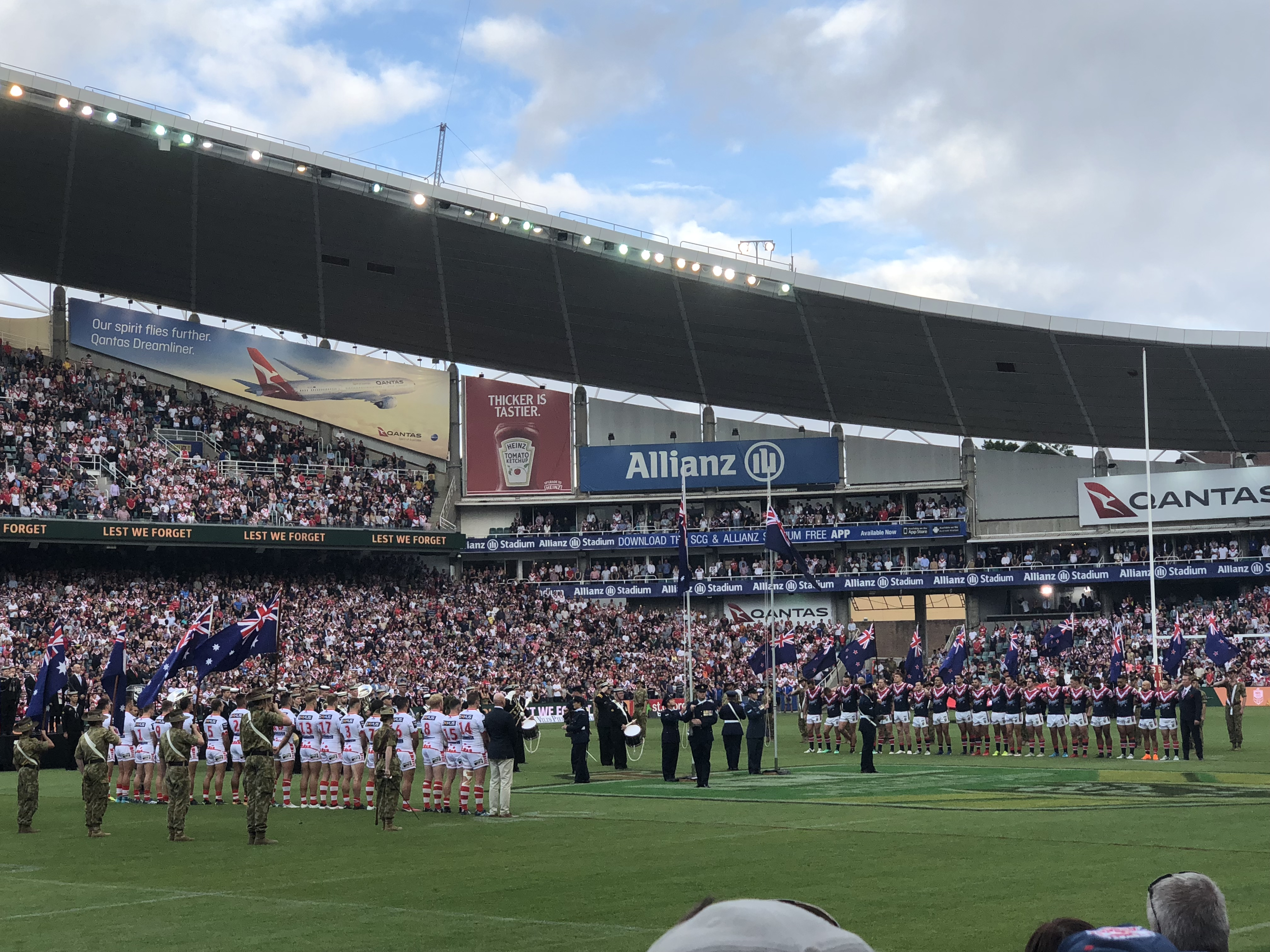
Pre-match formalities taking place prior to the Dragons vs Roosters Anzac Day clash in 2018

In 2012 the Sydney Cricket & Sports Ground Trust announced a master plan to redevelop SFS, as well as the SCG and the surrounding area. The development of the SFS would have included a new fully covered roof and a new LED facade mesh for the stadium which would allow the exterior to change colours to suit the home team, similar to the Allianz Arena in Munich.

As well, development to the surrounding area would have included a new public plaza between the SCG and SFS, new transport infrastructure, new underground car parks (4,100 cars) and development of the surrounding parkland. The scheduled start date for the project would have commenced after the completion of the SCG redevelopment, in January 2014. In early 2015, the video screens were replaced with large High Definition screens similar to the one at the Dally Messenger Stand at the SCG.

In September 2015, the New South Wales Government announced a proposal to replace the SFS with a new 50,000 to 55,000 seat venue. The proposed new stadium was cancelled in April 2016, with the SFS to be refurbished instead.

In 2017 the NSW Government announced that the SFS along with Stadium Australia would be demolished and rebuilt at a cost of $2.3 billion. The final event at the stadium was a Michael Bublé concert on 5 October 2018. Demolition began in early 2019.

In December 2019, the NSW Government awarded the construction contract for the new Sydney Football Stadium to John Holland, with a planned completion date in time for the September 2022 NRL Grand Final.

The plan to demolish and rebuild Stadium Australia was later scrapped in favour of refurbishment.

== Sporting events ==
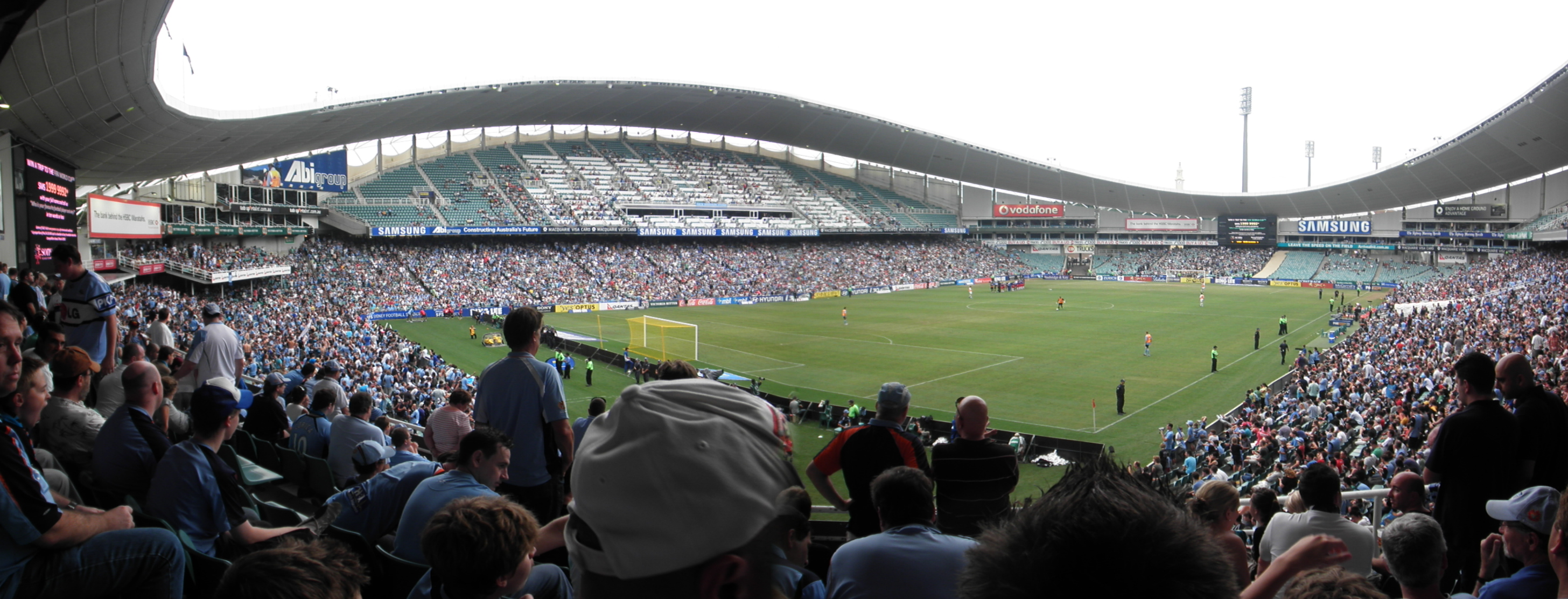
Panorama of Sydney Football Stadium from the north-west corner before an A-League game between Sydney FC and Melbourne Victory, 14 February 2010
- 1988: The stadium hosted the 100th rugby league test match between Australia and Great Britain/England
- 1993: Argentinian player Diego Maradona played here in the World Cup qualifier against Australia, in which the match was drawn 1–1
- 1994: Rugby union provided a moment of magic thanks to George Gregan's last second match-winning tackle on NZ's Jeff Wilson in which Australia regained the Bledisloe Cup
- 19 December 1997: representatives of clubs affiliated with the Australian Rugby League gathered at the SFS to decide whether to accept News Limited's offer of a settlement with the breakaway 'Super League' - eventually voting in favour by 36 votes to 4
- 27 September 1998: The SFS hosted the inaugural NRL Grand Final between the Brisbane Broncos and Canterbury Bulldogs. It was to be the last rugby league Grand Final the stadium would host, with grand finals moving to the then 110,000 seat Stadium Australia from 1999
- 2 November 2002: The Stadium hosted both opening and closing ceremonies of the 2002 Gay Games
- 17 May 2006: the stadium hosted the boxing fight between Danny Green and Anthony Mundine
- 5 March 2006: the inaugural A-League Grand Final was held here. Sydney FC defeated the Central Coast Mariners 1–0 in front of 41,689
- 25 November 2006: the stadium hosted the 2006 Rugby League Tri-Nations Final
- 24 February 2008: the SFS hosted the 2008 A-League Grand Final between Newcastle and the Central Coast Mariners
- 2010: Qualifying Final between the Sydney Roosters and Wests Tigers, where Roosters player Braith Anasta kicked a field goal off the scrum to send the game to golden point, then Roosters player Shaun Kenny-Dowall intercepted a ball and scored in extra time
- 29 February 2012: Insurer Allianz announces a multi-year partnership with the SCG Trust to see the stadium officially renamed Allianz Stadium
- 21 April 2013: 2013 A-League Grand Final between Central Coast Mariners and Western Sydney Wanderers
- 26 August 2017: 2017 NCAA DI FBS American college football season opening match, between the Owls of Rice University and the Cardinal of Stanford University
- 7 May 2017: 2017 A-League Grand Final between Sydney FC and Melbourne Victory
- 4 November 2017: RLWC 2017 pool stage match between England and Lebanon
- 11 November 2017: RLWC 2017 pool stage match between Australia and Lebanon
- 21 November 2017: 2017 FFA Cup Final between Sydney FC and Adelaide United where Sydney were winners 2–1. Attendance 13,452
- 17 February 2018: 2018 AFLX competition consisting of 6 teams (Greater Western Sydney, Richmond, Brisbane Lions, Sydney, Western Bulldogs and Gold Coast)
- 22 September 2018: The last sporting event at the Sydney Football Stadium prior to demolition, an NRL preliminary final between the Sydney Roosters and the South Sydney Rabbitohs, took place with the Roosters running out 12–4 winners in front of a stadium record crowd of 44,380

== Concerts ==
- 26 & 27 November 1993: U2 performed during their Zoo TV Tour. The show on the 27th was recorded and released as the concert film, Zoo TV: Live from Sydney
- 27 February 1998: U2 - Popmart Tour
- 9 & 10 March 2000: Barbra Streisand - Timeless Tour
- 7 July 2007: Australian concert of Live Earth
- 22 November 2009: Pearl Jam concert, as listed on their page for the Backspacer Tour
- 26 February 2010: George Michael performed his first concert in Sydney since 1988
- 17 18 & 19 December 2010: Bon Jovi - The Circle Tour
- 2 & 4 December 2011: Eminem - Recovery Tour
- 8 December 2011: Foo Fighters - Wasting Light World Tour
- 17 & 18 November 2012: Coldplay - Mylo Xyloto Tour
- 4 December 2013: Taylor Swift - Red Tour
- 7 & 8 February 2015: One Direction - On The Road Again Tour
- 9 December 2015: Ed Sheeran - X Tour
- 13 & 14 December 2016: Coldplay - A Head Full of Dreams Tour
- 2 December 2017: Sia - Nostalgic for the Present Tour
- 5 October 2018: Michael Bublé concert, final event before the stadium closed

== Other events ==
- 2005: the Edinburgh Military Tattoo - A Salute to Australia.
- February 2007: the stadium was recently under renovation, during which the capacity was expanded to 45,500, and a second video screen was added. Renovations were completed.
- March 2015: The two video screens were replaced with much larger screens.

== Attendance records ==
Record	Attendance	Date	Result	Event
Rugby league	44,380	22 September 2018	Sydney Roosters def. South Sydney 12–4	2018 NRL Finals Series
Rugby union	44,085	23 June 2018	Ireland def. Australia 20–16	Lansdowne Cup
Soccer	43,967	31 October 1993	Australia 1–1 Argentina	1994 FIFA World Cup qualifier
As of 23 September 2018

== Grand finals ==
From its opening in 1988, until 1998, the Sydney Football Stadium was the venue for the NSWRL/ARL/NRL grand final, and has also hosted three A-League grand finals.

=== Rugby league ===
Year	Date	Result	Attendance
1988	11 September	Canterbury-Bankstown Bulldogs def. Balmain Tigers 24–12	40,000
1989	24 September	Canberra Raiders def. Balmain Tigers 19–14 (ET)	40,500
1990	23 September	Canberra Raiders def. Penrith Panthers 18–14	41,535
1991	21 September	Penrith Panthers def. Canberra Raiders 19–12	41,815
1992	27 September	Brisbane Broncos def. St George Dragons 28–8	41,560
1993	26 September	Brisbane Broncos def. St George Dragons 14–6	42,329
1994	25 September	Canberra Raiders def. Canterbury-Bankstown Bulldogs 36–12	42,234
1995	24 September	Sydney Bulldogs def. Manly-Warringah Sea Eagles 17–4	41,127
1996	29 September	Manly-Warringah Sea Eagles def. St George Dragons 20–8	40,985
1997	28 September	Newcastle Knights def. Manly-Warringah Sea Eagles 22–16	42,482
1998	27 September	Brisbane Broncos def. Canterbury Bulldogs 38–12	40,857

* Canterbury-Bankstown Bulldogs and Canberra Raiders hold the record for the most grand Final appearances at the stadium with four each. The Bulldogs appeared as Canterbury-Bankstown in 1988 and 1994, as the Sydney Bulldogs in 1995 and as the Canterbury Bulldogs in 1998
* Canberra and the Brisbane Broncos hold the record for most grand final wins at the stadium with three each.
* Brisbane and the Newcastle Knights are the only teams to win each of their grand finals played at the stadium.
* St George and Balmain are the only clubs who failed to win in any of their grand Final appearances at the stadium.
* Canterbury-Bankstown appeared in the first and last grand finals at the SFS.
* Brisbane's 26 point win over Canterbury-Bankstown in 1998 is the biggest grand final winning margin at the SFS. Canberra's 4 point win over Penrith in 1990 is the smallest winning margin.

=== A-League ===
Since the A-League's first season in 2006, the Sydney Football Stadium has hosted the A-League grand final on four occasions, including the inaugural grand final between Sydney FC and the Central Coast Mariners.

Year	Date	Result	Attendance
2006	5 March	Sydney FC 1–0 Central Coast Mariners	41,689
2008	24 February	Central Coast Mariners 0–1 Newcastle Jets	36,354
2013	21 April	Western Sydney Wanderers 0–2 Central Coast Mariners	42,102
2017	7 May	Sydney FC 1–1 (4–2) Melbourne Victory	41,546

== Rugby league test matches ==
The Football Stadium has hosted twelve Australia internationals and one involving the Australian Super League. The results were as follows;

Date	"Home"	"Away"	Result	Attendance	Part of
11 June 1988	Australia	Great Britain	17–6	24,480	1988 Ashes series – 1st Test; 100th test match between Australia and Great Britain / England
9 July 1988	Australia	Great Britain	12–26	15,944	1988 Ashes series – 3rd Test; 1985–1988 Rugby League World Cup group stage
27 July 1988	Australia	Rest of the World	22–10	15,301	1988 Bicentenary
24 July 1991	Australia	New Zealand	44–0	34,911	1991 Trans-Tasman Test series – 2nd Test
12 June 1992	Australia	(United Kingdom) Great Britain	22–6	40,141	1992 Ashes series – 1st Test
7 July 1995	Australia	New Zealand	20–10	27,568	1995 Trans-Tasman Test series – 2nd Test
25 April 1997*	Australia	New Zealand	34–22	23,829	1997 Anzac Test
12 July 2002	Australia	(United Kingdom) Great Britain	64–10	31,844	
25 July 2003	Australia	New Zealand	48–6	30,605	
4 November 2006	Australia	(United Kingdom) Great Britain	12–23	24,953	2006 Rugby League Tri-Nations
25 November 2006	Australia	New Zealand	16–12	27,325	2006 Rugby League Tri-Nations Final
26 October 2008	Australia	New Zealand	30–6	34,157	2008 Rugby League World Cup Group A
16 November 2008	Australia	Fiji	52–0	15,855	2008 Rugby League World Cup Semi-final
2 May 2014	Australia	New Zealand	30–18	25,459	2014 Anzac Test
4 November 2017	England	Lebanon	29–10	10,237	2017 Rugby League World Cup Group A Match
11 November 2017	Australia	Lebanon	34–0	21,127	2017 Rugby League World Cup Group A Match

* 1997 Anzac Test match played against the Australian Super League team. The Australian Rugby League and Australian Rugby League Commission do not count this as an official test, though it is counted by the New Zealand Rugby League and the Rugby League International Federation.

== Rugby union test matches ==
Since its opening in 1988, the Football Stadium has hosted twenty seven Australia rugby union internationals. The results were as follows;

Date	Opponents	Result	Attendance
1 July 1989	British and Irish Lions	30–12	39,433
15 July 1989	British and Irish Lions	18–19	39,401
9 June 1990	France	21–9	34,572
30 July 1990	France	19–28	34,776
27 July 1991	England	40–15	39,681
10 August 1991	New Zealand	21–12	41,565
13 June 1992	Scotland	27–12	35,535
4 July 1992	New Zealand	16–15	39,870
25 July 1992	New Zealand	23–26	40,438
31 July 1993	South Africa	20–28	41,190
21 August 1993	South Africa	19–12	41,877
11 June 1994	Ireland	32–18	37,239
6 August 1994	Samoa	73–3	30,167
17 August 1994	New Zealand	20–16	41,917
6 May 1995	Argentina	30–13	27,829
29 July 1995	New Zealand	23–34	39,327
22 June 1996	Wales	42–3	35,784
13 July 1996	South Africa	21–16	41,850
21 June 1997	France	29–15	31,572
12 July 1997	England	25–6	40,132
13 June 1998	Scotland	45–3	36,263
29 August 1998	New Zealand	19–14	40,501
23 June 2012	Wales	20–19	42,889
21 June 2014	France	39–13	43,188
25 June 2016	England	40–44	44,063
17 June 2017	Scotland	19–24	30,721
23 June 2018	Ireland	16–20	44,085

=== Rugby World Cup ===
The SFS also hosted five 2003 Rugby World Cup matches but none of them involved Australia. The results were as follows;

Date	Competition	Home team		Away team		Attendance
19 October 2003	2003 Rugby World Cup Pool A	Ireland	64	Namibia	7	35,382
22 October 2003	2003 Rugby World Cup Pool A	Argentina	50	Romania	3	33,673
24 October 2003	2003 Rugby World Cup Pool C	South Africa	46	Georgia	19	34,308
28 October 2003	2003 Rugby World Cup Pool C	Georgia	12	Uruguay	24	28,576
1 November 2003	2003 Rugby World Cup Pool B	Scotland	22	Fiji	20	37,137

== International soccer ==
List of international soccer matches played at the Sydney Football Stadium since 1988 (Senior men's games only). The 1993 FIFA World Cup qualification game between the Australia and Argentina (a team captained by legendary player Diego Maradona who was making his return to the side), attracted an over-capacity crowd of 43,967 (at the time, capacity stood at 42,500). This would remain the record attendance at the Football Stadium until 2018.

Test#	Date	Result	Attendance
1	14 July 1988	Australia 4–1 Argentina	18,985
2	17 July 1988	Australia 0–2 Brazil	28,161
3	12 March 1989	Australia 4–1 New Zealand	13,621
4	16 April 1989	Australia 1–1 Israel	40,320
5	1 June 1991	Australia 0–1 England	35,743
6	26 January 1992	Australia 0–0 Sweden	13,456
7	12 July 1992	Australia 0–0 Croatia	12,735
8	15 August 1993	Australia 2–1 Canada	25,982
9	31 October 1993	Australia 1–1 Argentina	43,967
10	12 June 1994	Australia 1–0 South Africa	17,769
11	11 February 1995	Australia 0–1 Colombia	15,000
12	15 February 1995	Australia 2–1 Japan	4,541
13	18 June 1995	Australia 1–0 Ghana	18,446
14	28 February 1996	Australia 0–0 Sweden	13,905
15	25 January 1997	Australia 1–0 Norway	17,429
16	11 February 1998	Australia 1–0 South Korea	9,823
17	9 June 2000	Australia 0–0 Paraguay	10,000
18	21 May 2004	Australia 1–3 Turkey	28,326
19	12 October 2004	Australia 6–1 Solomon Islands	19,208
20	16 August 2006	Australia 2–0 Kuwait	32,622
21	11 October 2006	Australia 2–0 Bahrain	36,606
22	23 May 2008	Australia 1–0 Ghana	29,914
23	10 October 2009	Australia 0–0 Netherlands	40,537
24	9 October 2010	Australia 1–0 Paraguay	25,210
25	19 November 2013	Australia 1–0 Costa Rica	20,165
26	29 March 2016	Australia 5–1 Jordan	24,975

=== 2000 Olympic Games ===
The Football Stadium hosted five games of the 2000 Olympic Games Men's Football tournament including a quarter final, a semi-final and the bronze medal match. It also hosted five matches of the Women's Football tournament including a Semi-final and the bronze and gold medal matches.

==== Men's tournament ====
Date	Time (AEST)	Team #1	Result	Team #2	Round	Attendance
16 September 2000	20:00	Australia	2–3	Nigeria	Group A	38,080
19 September 2000	20:00	Australia	1–2	Honduras	Group A	37,788
23 September 2000	20:00	Italy	0–1	Spain	Quarter-final 3	38,134
26 September 2000	20:00	Spain	3–1	United States	Semi-final 1	39,800
29 September 2000	20:00	United States	0–2	Chile	Bronze medal match	26,381

==== Women's tournament ====
Date	Time (AEST)	Team #1	Result	Team #2	Round	Attendance
16 September 2000	17:00	Australia	1–1	Sweden	Group E	33,600
19 September 2000	17:00	Australia	1–2	Brazil	Group E	29,400
24 September 2000	17:30	Germany	0–1	Norway	Semi-final 1	16,710
28 September 2000	17:00	Germany	2–0	Brazil	Bronze Medal match	11,200
28 September 2000	20:00	Norway	3–2 (a.e.t.)	United States	Gold Medal match	22,848

== See also ==
- Stadium Australia, another multi purpose stadium in Sydney

== State of Origin ==
From 1988 to 1998, the Sydney Football Stadium was the home of the New South Wales rugby league team in the State of Origin series.

Game	Date	Result	Attendance	Year
1	17 May 1988	Queensland def. New South Wales 26–18	26,441	1988
2	21 June 1988	Queensland def. New South Wales 38–22	16,910	1988
3	14 June 1989	Queensland def. New South Wales 16–12	40,000	1989
4	9 May 1990	New South Wales def. Queensland 8–0	41,235	1990
5	9 May 1991	New South Wales def. Queensland 14–12	41,520	1991
6	6 May 1992	New South Wales def. Queensland 14–6	40,039	1992
7	3 June 1992	New South Wales def. Queensland 16–4	41,878	1992
8	17 May 1993	New South Wales def. Queensland 16–12	41,895	1993
9	23 May 1994	Queensland def. New South Wales 16–12	41,859	1994
10	15 May 1995	Queensland def. New South Wales 2–0	39,841	1995
11	3 June 1996	New South Wales def. Queensland 18–6	41,955	1996
12	23 May 1997	Queensland def. New South Wales 18–12	33,241	1997
13	22 May 1998	Queensland def. New South Wales 24–23	36,070	1998
14	19 June 1998	Queensland def. New South Wales 19–4	39,952	1998

== Statues ==
- Trevor Allan (rugby union and rugby league)
- Ken Catchpole (rugby union)
- Reg Gasnier (rugby league)
- Dally Messenger (rugby league)
- Johnny Warren (soccer)
- Betty Cuthbert (sprint)
- Marlene Mathews (sprint)

== Transport ==
Sydney Football Stadium could be accessed by car, public transport and by walking. The nearest railway station was Central station, three kilometres away. On event days, express shuttle buses ran every five minutes from Chalmers Street at Central station to Moore Park. The buses utilised a bus road off Anzac Parade to improve travel times. In 2015, the Albert Cotter Bridge opened across Anzac Parade to improve the pedestrian links between the stadium and Central station and Surry Hills.
