= Harinder Sidhu =

Australian diplomat

Her Excellency Harinder Sidhu AM
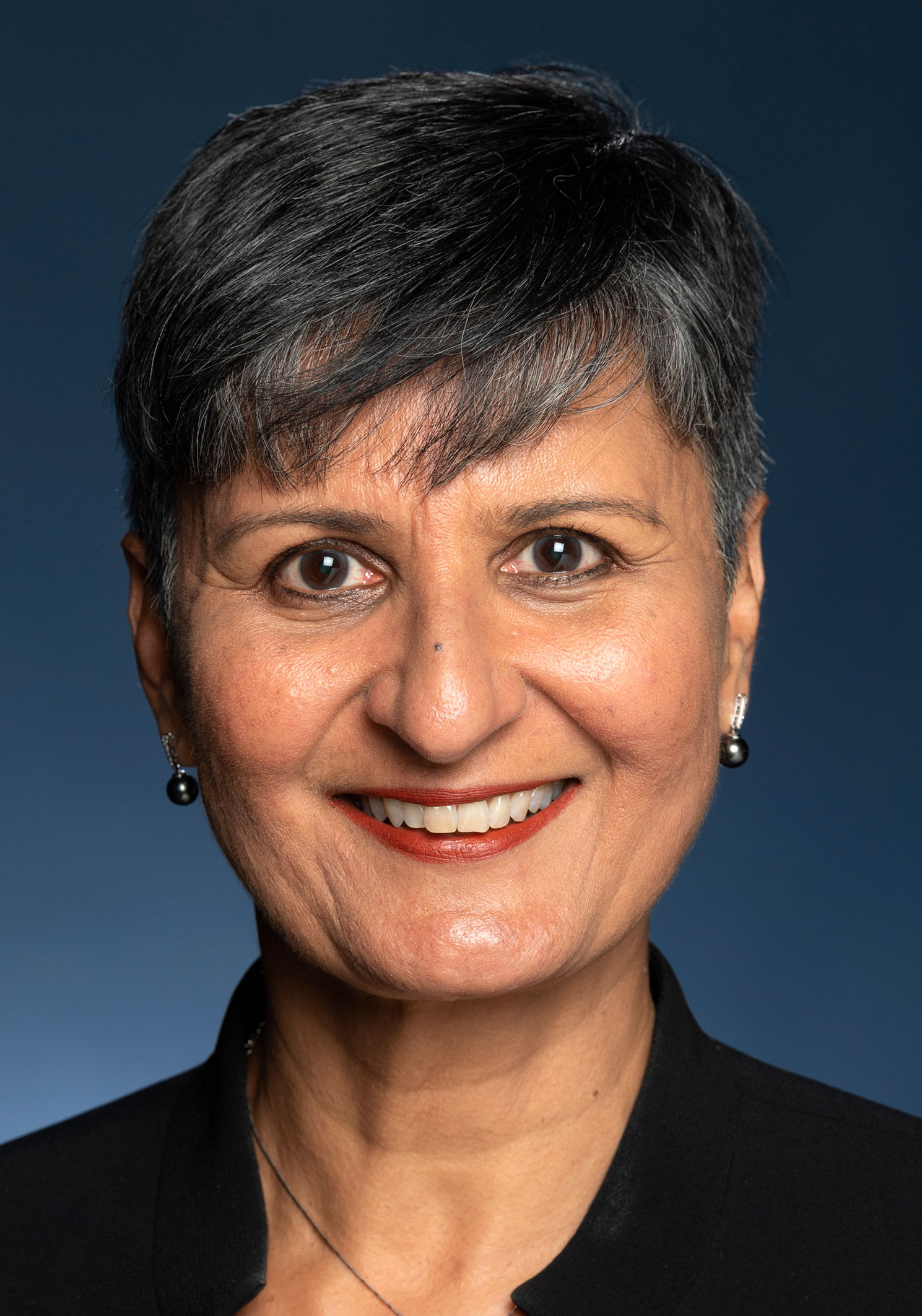

High Commissioner of Australia to New Zealand
- In office 31 March 2022 – 20 March 2025
- Preceded by: Patricia Forsythe
- Succeeded by: Daniel Sloper

High Commissioner of Australia to India
- In office 11 February 2016 – 18 February 2020
- Preceded by: Patrick Suckling
- Succeeded by: Barry O'Farrell

Personal details
- Born: Harinder Kaur Sidhu Singapore

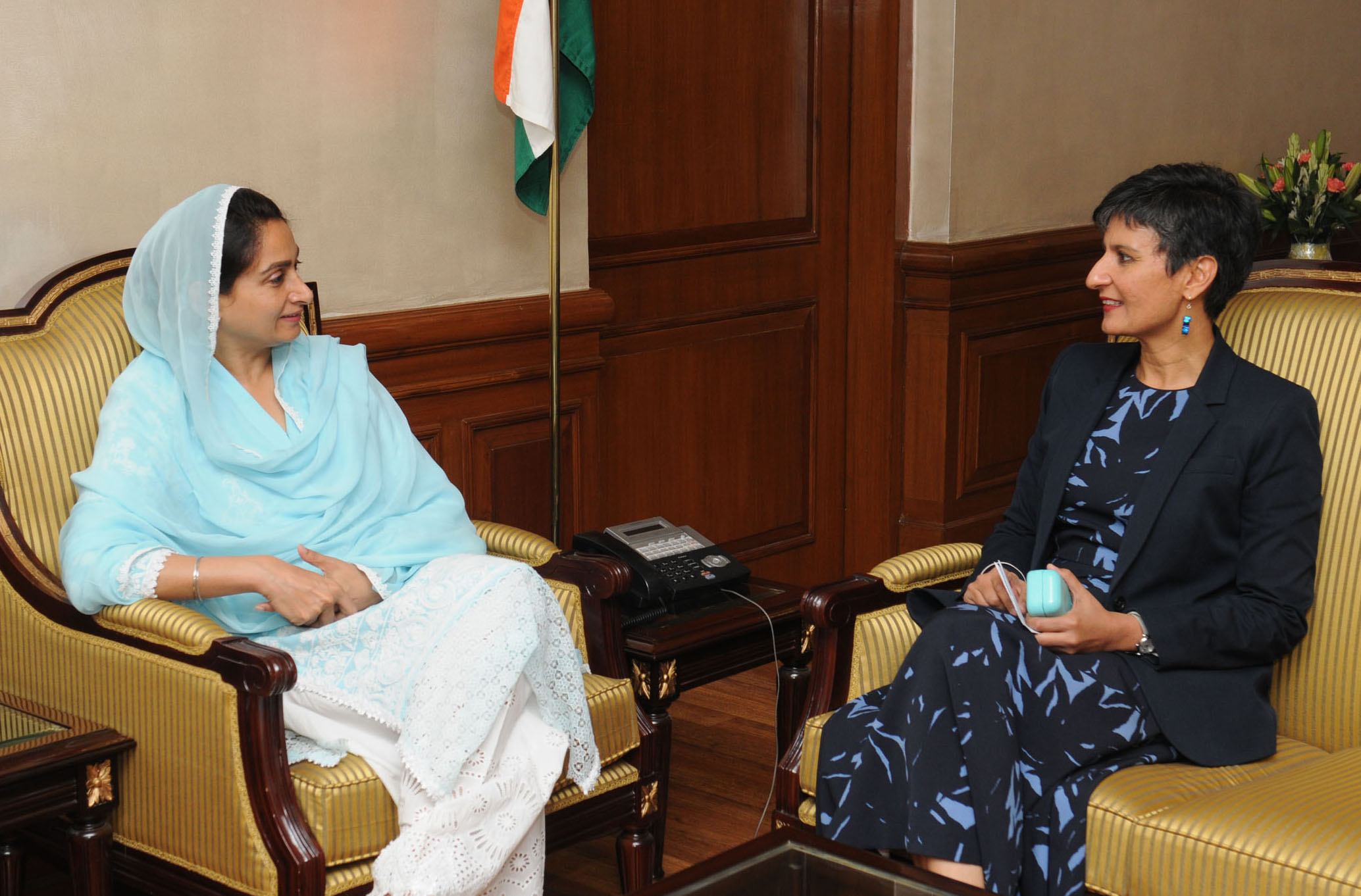
The Australian High Commissioner to India, Ms. Harinder Sidhu meeting the Union Minister for Food Processing Industries, Smt. Harsimrat Kaur Badal

Harinder Kaur Sidhu AM is an Australian career diplomat, formerly serving as the High Commissioner of Australia to New Zealand.

== Early life ==
She was born to Punjabi parents in Singapore. In 1974, she moved to Australia with her parents. She studied at the University of Sydney, obtaining a bachelor's degree in economics in 1985 and an LLB in 1987.

== Career ==
In 2016, she was appointed the Australian high commissioner to India.

In 2022, she was appointed the Australian high commissioner to New Zealand.

Sidhu was appointed a Member of the Order of Australia in the 2024 Australia Day Honours for her "significant service to public administration, and to foreign affairs".

== Personal life ==
She has one daughter.

== Awards ==
2024 - Member of the Order of Australia.

Diplomatic posts
| Preceded by Patrick Suckling | High Commissioner of Australia to India; 2016–2020 | Succeeded by Barry O'Farrell |
| Preceded by Patricia Forsythe | High Commissioner of Australia to New Zealand; 2022–present | Incumbent |
