= Catherine Livingstone =

Australian businesswoman

Catherine Livingstone AC FAA FTSE

Chair of the Commonwealth Bank
- In office 2017–2022
- Preceded by: David Turner
- Succeeded by: Paul O’Malley

Chair of Telstra
- In office 2009–2016

Chair of the CSIRO
- In office 6 November 2001 – 31 December 2006
- Preceded by: Charles Allen
- Succeeded by: Peter Willcox

Personal details
- Born: 17 September 1955 (age 71) Nairobi, Kenya
- Education: Macquarie University

Catherine Brighid Livingstone (born 17 September 1955) is an Australian businesswoman who has held positions in the Commonwealth Bank, CSIRO, Macquarie Group and Telstra.

== Early life and education ==
Catherine Brighid Livingstone was born in Nairobi, Kenya, on 17 September 1955. In 1960, her family migrated to Australia.

She attended Loreto Normanhurst School.

She graduated in 1977 with a Bachelor of Arts in Accounting with first class honours from Macquarie University in Sydney.

In 1992, she attended the International Program for Executive Development in Switzerland.

== Career ==
After graduating, Livingstone joined the accountancy firm of Price Waterhouse, working in both Sydney and London. She then held several accounting and management roles at Nucleus Ltd, finally reaching the position of chief executive, finance, before being made the CEO of one of its subsidiaries, Cochlear Limited, in 1994. In January 1995 she was appointed a director of Cochlear (UK) Limited, and in December 1999 of Cochlear Europe. She resigned from both positions in September 2000.

Livingstone was director of the Sydney Institute from 1998 to 2005, director of the Rural Press Foundation, and chair and director of the Australian Business Foundation from 2002 to 2005.

In 2000, she was appointed chair of Telstra, a position she retained until 2016.

In January 2001 she became a member of the CSIRO board. In November 2001 she was appointed chair, a position she retained until December 2006.

Livingstone was an independent voting director of the Macquarie Bank and the Macquarie Group from November 2003 to July 2013.

From 2007 to 2008, Livingstone was president of Chief Executive Women.

On 22 January 2008, it was announced that Livingstone would be a member of the panel conducting the review of Australia's national innovation system.

From 2013 until 2013 she was on the Prime Minister's Business Advisory Council, and in March 2014, was elected president of the Business Council of Australia for a two-year term, replacing Tony Shepherd. She was succeeded by Grant King in November 2016.

Livingstone replaced David Turner as chair of the Commonwealth Bank in January 2017. In November 2018 she gave evidence at the Banking Royal Commission about her predecessor's poor performance and the lack of transparency in how the bank dealt with following up his refusal to repay 40% of his annual fees. She said that she knew that she had risked her professional reputation in joining the board, but had been determined to change its corporate culture. She retired after nearly six years in the position, in August 2022.

=== Non-executive directorships ===
From 2007 until 2013, Livingstone was a non-executive director of the NSW Innovation and Productivity Council.

She joined the board of WorleyParsons as a non-executive director in July 2007, and was still a member of the board as of November 2017 but left sometime between then and December 2023.

=== The arts and education ===
Livingstone was a director of the Royal Institution of Australia from 2009 to 2011, and president of the Australian Museum Trust between 2012 and 2017.

From 2013 and as of 2024 Livingstone is patron of the Australian Design Innovation Network, an initiative led by CSIRO, the UTS Business School, and the Design Innovation Research Centre. She has also supported various UTS research initiatives and been involved in industry bodies, think tanks, and forums on behalf of UTS, including the launch of the UTS Centre for Corporate Governance in 2003.

From 2013 until 2015, she was a member of the John Grill Centre for Project leadership, at the University of Sydney, and from 2020 until 2022 a member of the Liveris Academy advisory board at the University of Queensland.

Livingstone became the Chancellor of University of Technology Sydney (UTS) on 1 December 2016, a position she retains as of April 2024.

From 2017 and continuing in 2024, she has been a non-executive director of The Australian Ballet.

== Recognition and awards ==
- ?: Fellow of Australian Institute of Company Directors
- ?: Fellow of Institute of Chartered Accountants Australia and New Zealand
- 1999: Eisenhower Exchange Fellowship for Australia
- 2000: Chartered Accountant in Business Award
- 2001: Centenary Medal, for service to Australian society in business leadership
- 2001: Fellow, Australian Academy of Technological Sciences and Engineering (FTSE)
- 2008: Officer of the Order of Australia (AO) in 2008, "for service to the development of Australian science, technology and innovation policies, to the business sector through leadership and management roles and as a contributor to professional organisations"
- 2009: Honorary Doctorate in Science from Murdoch University
- 2010: Honorary Degree of Doctor of Business from Macquarie University
- 2014: Honorary Degree of Doctor of Business, UTS, "in recognition of her commitment to leadership in design integration, science and technology innovation, corporate governance and her continued support of the advancement of women in business"
- 2014: Honorary Doctor of Letters, The University of Sydney
- 2014: Fellow of the Australian Academy of Science
- 2015: Honorary Doctor of Science, University of Wollongong
- 2024: Companion of the Order of Australia (AC), "for eminent service to business, particularly through governance and strategic reform, to tertiary education, to science, technology and innovation capability development, and to the arts"

Business positions
Preceded by David Turner	Chairman of the Commonwealth Bank of Australia; 2017 – 2022	Succeeded by Paul O’Malley
