= Tony Shepherd (businessman) =

Australian businessman (born 1944)

Tony Shepherd AO
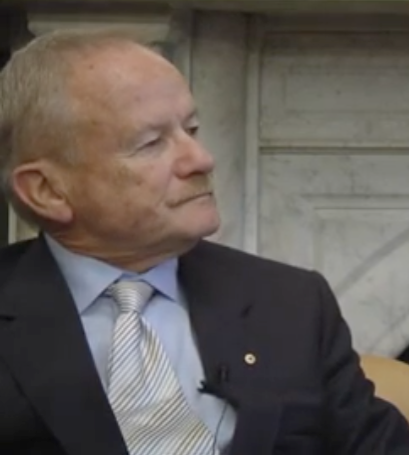
- In a 2014 interview
- Born: 5 June 1944 (age 82); Melbourne, Australia
- Occupation: Businessman
- Years active: 1979–present

Anthony Shepherd AO (born 5 June 1944, Melbourne) is an Australian businessman. The first 15 years of his career were in the Australian Public Service. He joined Transfield Services in 1979, going on to become chairman of the Transfield board. Shepherd resigned from Transfield in 2013.

He is currently Chair of the Boards of the Greater Western Sydney Giants, the Australian Subscription Television and Radio Association and the Sydney Cricket Ground Trust.

== Career ==
Tony Shepherd was educated at CBC St Kilda in Melbourne and started his career as a federal public servant while studying commerce part-time at the University of Melbourne. He worked in defence procurement in Canberra and for three years in Washington DC in the 1970s. On return to Australia in 1973 he joined the National Pipeline Authority under energy minister Rex Connor. He worked on the development of the Moomba to Sydney Pipeline during this time. He spent a total of 15 years as a public servant.

In 1979 a friend introduced Shepherd to Franco Belgiorno-Nettis, who offered him a job at the infrastructure company Transfield Services in North Sydney. At Transfield, Shepherd's first big project was the Sydney Harbour Tunnel, which was an early example of public–private partnership in Australia. In March 2001, Shepherd was appointed a director on the Transfield Services board. He became Chairman in 2005, retiring from the role in October 2013. During his time at Transfield he worked on EastLink and the Lane Cove Tunnel.

In 2011 he became president of the Business Council of Australia for a two-year term, later extended by six months to March 2014. He was succeeded by Catherine Livingstone.

By 2012 he was also chairing the Greater Western Sydney Giants and was a trustee and later chairman of the Sydney Cricket Ground Trust. As Chair of the Giants, he and other board members set key performance indicators for both the football and business side of the team.

In June 2012 he was made an officer of the Order of Australia for services to business, particularly infrastructure development, the arts and sport.

In November 2013 he was appointed chairman of the Australian Subscription Television and Radio Association. He was chairman of Abbott government's National Commission of Audit which ran between 2013 and March 2014. He was chairman of the WestConnex Delivery Authority from its establishment in November 2013, resigning in October 2015 when the organisation was merged into the Sydney Motorway Corporation.

== Personal life ==
Shepherd married Loredana Vilovich in 1964. They had three children.
