= Kerrie Mather =

Australian business executive

Kerrie Mather is an Australian business executive and chief executive officer of Venues NSW, a merger entity of the Sydney Cricket Ground Trust and former Venues NSW.

She was previously the CEO of the Sydney Cricket Ground Trust. She was the first female to hold the position in its 160-year history.

From 2011 to 2017 she was the Managing Director and CEO of Sydney Airport, leading major infrastructure, operational and commercial initiatives during her tenure.
