= List of high commissioners of Australia to New Zealand =

High Commissioner of Australia to New Zealand

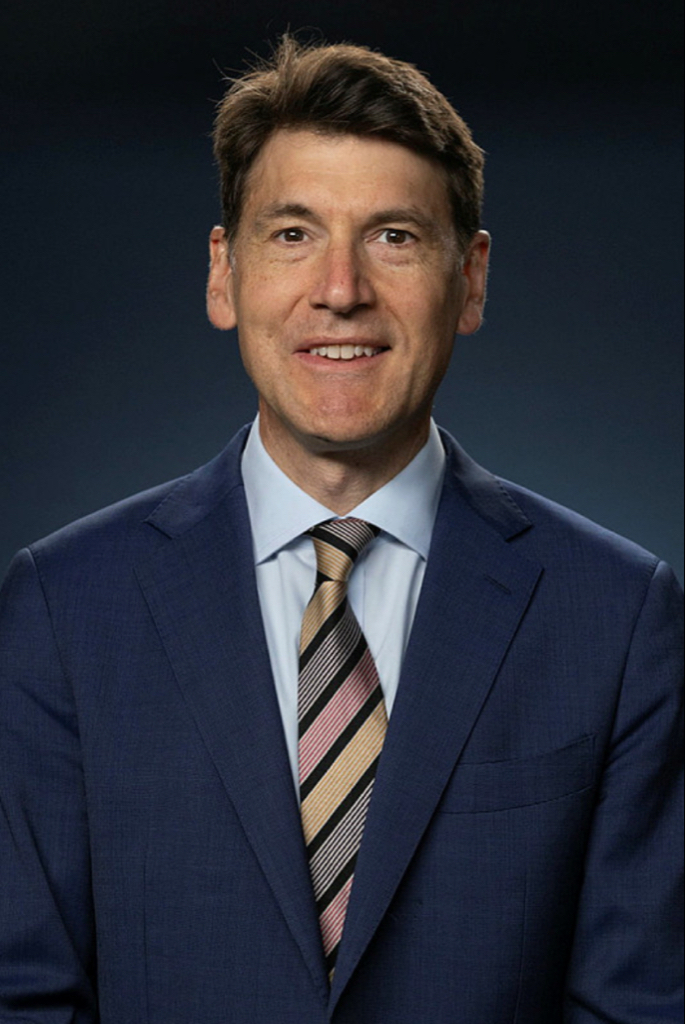
- Incumbent; Daniel Sloper since 20 March 2025
- Department of Foreign Affairs and Trade
- Style: Her Excellency
- Reports to: Minister for Foreign Affairs
- Residence: Vogel House, Lower Hutt (1966–1976); 15 Butavas Street, Khandallah (since 1976)
- Seat: DIC Building, Lambton Quay (1934–1947); Government Life Insurance Building (1947–1964); ICI House, Molesworth Street (1964–1972); 72 Hobson Street, Thorndon (since 1972)
- Nominator: Prime Minister of Australia
- Appointer: Governor-General of Australia
- Inaugural holder: Thomas D'Alton
- Formation: 15 December 1943
- Website: Australian High Commission, New Zealand

The high commissioner of Australia to New Zealand is an officer of the Australian Department of Foreign Affairs and Trade and the head of the High Commission of the Commonwealth of Australia to New Zealand in Wellington. The high commissioner has the rank and status of an ambassador extraordinary and plenipotentiary and is currently Mr Daniel Sloper since 20 March 2025, who also has responsibility for Tokelau in the Realm of New Zealand, as well as the Pitcairn Islands, an overseas territory of the United Kingdom. Accreditation was previously held for the Cook Islands and Niue, states in free association as part of the Realm of New Zealand, which now have resident Australian high commissions since March 2020 and August 2020, respectively.

The posting is one of Australia's oldest, with the first high commissioner appointed in 1943, although it dates much earlier to 1934 when an Australian Government Trade Commissioner was appointed to Wellington. There is also a Consulate-General and Trade Commission in Auckland maintained by Austrade since 1955.

== Posting history ==
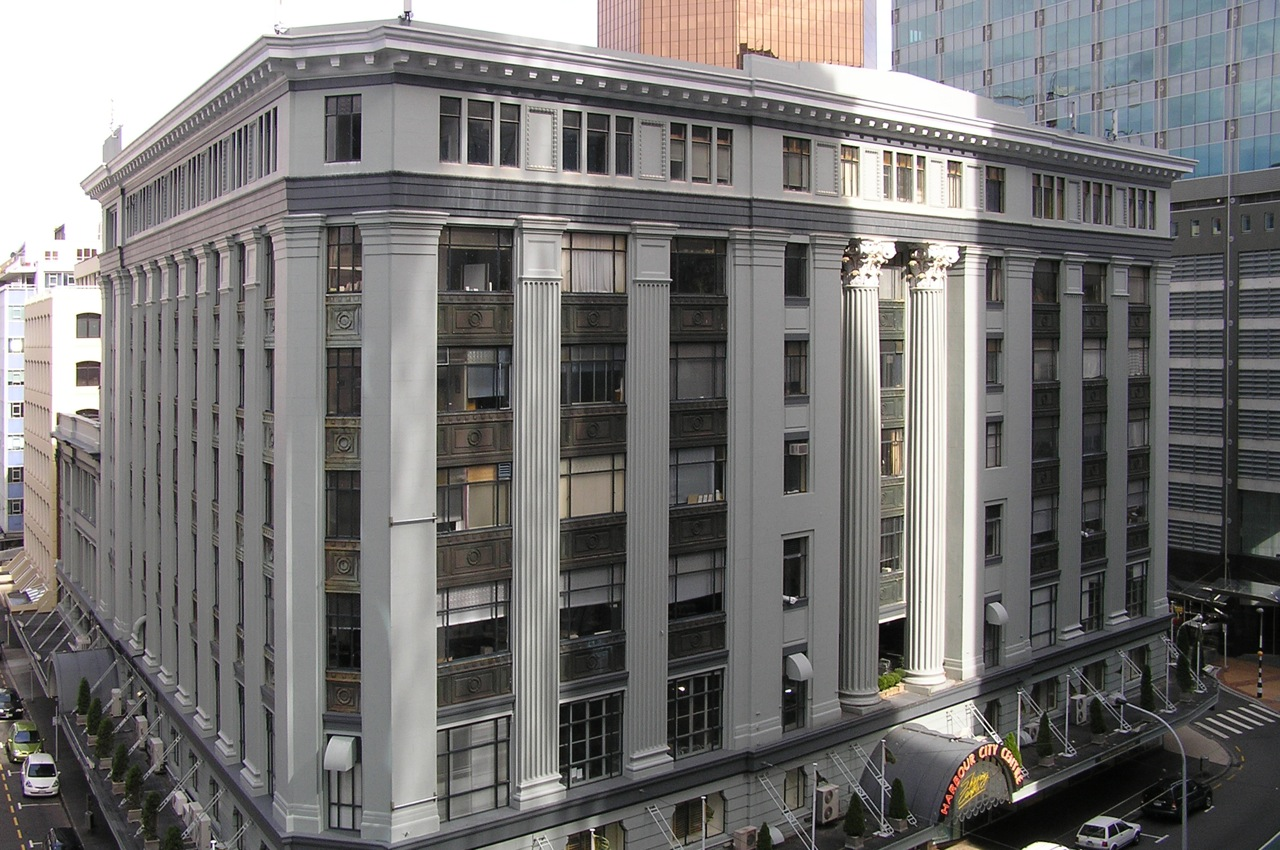
The DIC Department Store Building in Lambton Quay, Wellington, home of the first Australian Trade Commission in New Zealand in 1934.

The first official Australian representation in New Zealand dates back to March 1934, when the Commonwealth government of Joseph Lyons as part of its policy of expanding trade connections in the Asia-Pacific region, appointed prominent businessman Robert Henry Nesbitt, as the first Trade Commissioner of Australia in New Zealand. Nesbitt's appointment followed from the signing of a trade agreement between the two countries on 7 April 1933, which was ratified by the parliament on 10 November 1933. To be stationed in the city of Wellington, the government also appointed a senior public servant from the Department of the Interior as assistant trade commissioner, James Payne. Nesbitt commenced his position on 29 August 1934, arriving in Wellington aboard the Huddart Parker liner, MS Wanganella, and setting up offices in the DIC Building in Lambton Quay. Nesbitt served until 15 April 1937, when he was appointed as Chairman of the Milk Board of New South Wales.

With Nesbitt's departure, in July 1937 the Australian Government appointed the Trade Commissioner in Batavia, Dutch East Indies, Charles Edward Critchley, as the next Trade Commissioner in Wellington. Critchley took over from acting commissioner Payne on 6 December 1937 when he arrived in Wellington aboard the Union Company liner, TSS Awatea. Critchley's assistant trade commissioner was also named in November 1937, with the brother of (then attorney-general) Robert Menzies, James Leslie Menzies, appointed. In March 1941, Critchley was appointed Assistant Controller General of Food and was recalled to Australia in April 1941, with Menzies serving as acting trade commissioner and Australia's de facto official representative in New Zealand.

By 1942, the governments in Canberra and Wellington had decided upon upgrading their respective representatives to the level of high commissioner. In March 1943, Carl Berendsen was appointed as the first high commissioner of New Zealand in Australia, and in November 1943 the Minister for External Affairs, H. V. Evatt, appointed the Deputy Premier of Tasmania, Thomas D'Alton, as Australia's first high commissioner to New Zealand.

In 1955, a separate Australian Trade Commission posting was established in the city of Auckland, with Benjamin Dawson serving as the first Trade Commissioner. The trade commission in Auckland was upgraded to a consulate-general from 1 August 1975. A trade commissioner was also appointed to the city of Christchurch from 1957 to 1979.

=== Cook Islands and Niue ===
In 1994, Australia formally established diplomatic relations with the Cook Islands, a self-governing state since 1974 in free association with New Zealand, with the high commissioner in Wellington also serving as high commissioner to the Cook Islands. In November 2018, Prime Minister Scott Morrison announced an expansion of Australia's diplomatic representation to all members of the Pacific Islands Forum, including opening a new high commission in the Cook Islands and Niue. On 18 December 2019, Foreign Minister Marise Payne. announced the establishment of a resident Australian High Commission in the Cook Islands to "help underscore Australia’s focus on deepening engagement across the region." The first resident high commissioner, Christopher Watkins, took office in Rarotonga on 17 March 2020.

On 27 February 2014 Australia formally established diplomatic relations with Niue, a self-governing state since 1974 in free association with New Zealand, with the high commissioner in Wellington also serving as high commissioner to Niue. The first resident high commissioner, Susan Allen, took office in Alofi on 26 August 2020.

== Heads of mission ==
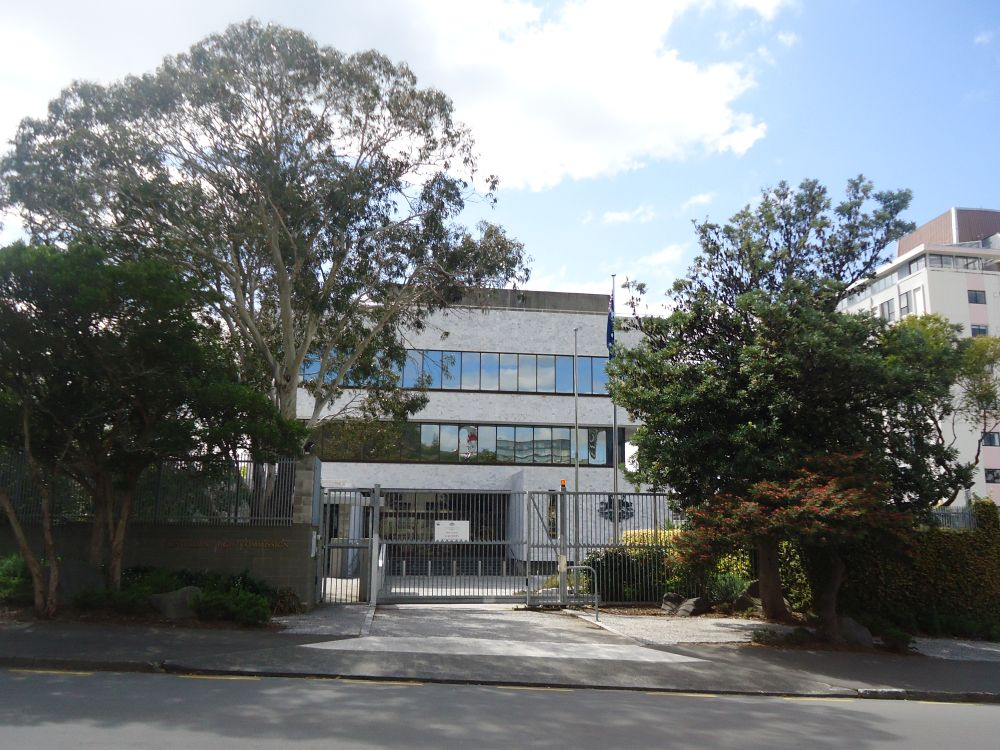
The Australian High Commission, 72 Hobson Street, Thorndon.

#	Officeholder	Title	Other offices	Term start date	Term end date	Time in office	Notes
1	Robert Henry Nesbitt	Trade Commissioner		29 August 1934	15 April 1937	2 years, 229 days	
−	James Payne (Acting)	Trade Commissioner		15 April 1937	6 December 1937	235 days	
2	Charles Edward Critchley	Trade Commissioner		6 December 1937	April 1941	3 years, 3 months	
−	James Leslie Menzies (Acting)	Trade Commissioner		April 1941	15 December 1943	2 years, 8 months	
3	Thomas D'Alton	High Commissioner		15 December 1943	April 1946	2 years, 3 months	
4	Roden Cutler	High Commissioner		April 1946	6 May 1953	7 years, 1 month	
5	Peter Heydon	High Commissioner		6 May 1953	30 April 1955	1 year, 359 days	
−	Owen Davis (Acting)	High Commissioner		30 April 1955	6 April 1956	342 days	
6	Sir John Collins	High Commissioner		6 April 1956	6 November 1962	6 years, 214 days	
7	Donald Alastair Cameron	High Commissioner		6 November 1962	5 November 1965	2 years, 364 days	
−	D. J. Horne	High Commissioner		5 November 1965	December 1965	0 months	
8	David McNicol	High Commissioner		December 1965	28 February 1968	2 years, 2 months	
9	Sir Edwin Hicks	High Commissioner		28 February 1968	18 May 1971	3 years, 79 days	
10	Dame Annabelle Rankin	High Commissioner		6 June 1971	30 September 1974	3 years, 116 days	
11	Brian Hill	High Commissioner		1 October 1974	December 1975	1 year, 2 months	
12	Colin Moodie	High Commissioner		December 1975	October 1977	1 year, 10 months	
13	Lew Border	High Commissioner		October 1977	2 February 1980	2 years, 4 months	
14	James Webster	High Commissioner		2 February 1980	30 April 1984	4 years, 88 days	
15	Les Johnson	High Commissioner		1 May 1984	July 1987	3 years, 2 months	
16	Bill McKinnon	High Commissioner		July 1987	10 December 1988	1 year, 5 months	
17	Robert Laurie	High Commissioner		February 1989	December 1992	3 years, 10 months	
18	Ray Greet	High Commissioner	^{A}	January 1993	January 1996	3 years	
19	Geoff Miller	High Commissioner	^{A}	January 1996	February 2000	4 years, 1 month	
20	Bob Cotton	High Commissioner	^{A}	February 2000	July 2003	3 years, 5 months	
21	Allan Hawke	High Commissioner	^{A}	July 2003	27 February 2006	2 years, 7 months	
22	John Dauth	High Commissioner	^{A}	27 February 2006	September 2008	2 years, 6 months	
−	Frank Ingruber	High Commissioner	^{A}	September 2008	May 2009	8 months	
23	Paul O'Sullivan	High Commissioner	^{A}	May 2009	July 2012	3 years, 2 months	
24	Michael Potts	High Commissioner	^{A}^{B}	July 2012	January 2016	3 years, 6 months	
25	Peter Woolcott	High Commissioner	^{A}^{B}	28 January 2016	1 August 2017	1 year, 185 days	
−	Andrew Cumpston	High Commissioner	^{A}^{B}	1 August 2017	14 February 2018	197 days	
26	Ewen McDonald	High Commissioner	^{A}^{B}	14 February 2018	2 March 2019	1 year, 16 days	
27	Patricia Forsythe	High Commissioner	^{A}^{B}	2 March 2019	31 March 2022	3 years, 29 days	
28	Harinder Sidhu	High Commissioner		31 March 2022	20 March 2025	4 years, 160 days	

=== Notes ===
^A Also non-resident High Commissioner to the Cook Islands, 1994–2020.
^B Also non-resident High Commissioner to Niue, 2014–2020.

== Consuls-general in Auckland ==
Name	Start of term	End of term	References
Michael Crawford	January 2008	December 2013	
John Brand	January 2014	July 2018	
Craig Knowles	July 2018	October 2022	
Brad Williams	October 2022	February 2026	
Stirling Hinchliffe	February 2026	Incumbent	

== See also ==
- Australia–New Zealand relations
- List of high commissioners of New Zealand to Australia
