= Venues NSW =

Agency of the New South Wales Government

Venues New South Wales

Government agency overview
- Formed: 2 March 2012; 13 years ago
- Preceding agencies: Hunter Region Sporting Venues Authority; Parramatta Stadium Trust; Illawarra Venues Authority; Sydney Cricket Ground Trust
- Minister responsible: Steve Kamper, Minister for Sport
- Government agency executive: Kerrie Mather, chief executive officer
- Parent department: Department of Creative Industries, Tourism, Hospitality and Sport
- Website: www.venuesnsw.com

Venues NSW is an agency of the Government of New South Wales that owns and operates several sporting facilities across New South Wales, Australia. It was established on 2 March 2012 from the merger of three trusts, namely the Hunter Region Sporting Venues Authority, Parramatta Stadium Trust and Illawarra Venues Authority. Illawarra Venues Authority itself replaced the Wollongong Sportsground Trust in December 2009.

On 1 December 2020, the Sydney Cricket Ground Trust was also merged into Venues NSW.

As of August 2022, Venues NSW's venues are:

- Stadium Australia (Accor Stadium)
- Western Sydney Stadium (CommBank Stadium)
- Newcastle International Sports Centre (McDonald Jones Stadium)
- Newcastle Entertainment Centre and Showground
- Sydney Cricket Ground
- Sydney Football Stadium (Allianz Stadium)
- Wollongong Showground and Wollongong Entertainment Centre (WIN Sports Stadium and Entertainment Centres)
