= Business Council of Australia =

Major Australian trade association

- Established: 1983; 43 years ago
- Headquarters: Melbourne, Victoria, Australia
- Region served: Australia
- Services: Business representation, as a trade association
- Official language: English
- Key people: Bran Black (CEO)
- Website: bca.com.au

The Business Council of Australia (BCA) is an industry association that comprises the chief executives of more than 130 of Australia's biggest corporations.

It was formed in 1983 by the merger of the Business Roundtable – a spin-off of the Committee for Economic Development of Australia – and the Australian Industry Development Association. The organisation is headquartered in Melbourne with offices in Sydney and Canberra.

BCA's stated goal is to give the business community a greater voice in public policy debates about the direction of Australian society.

== History ==
=== AIPL/AIDA ===
The Australian Industries Protection League (AIPL) was established in Melbourne in January 1919 as a successor to the Protectionist Association of Victoria. James Hume Cook, a former federal MP and ally of Nationalist leader Billy Hughes, was appointed secretary of the organisation in 1922 and held the position until his death in 1942. He represented the league at the British Empire Economic Conference in Ottawa in 1932.

According to Peter Cochrane, its members were "first and foremost, advocates of high, even prohibitive, protection; they possessed a profound belief in the virtuosity of the small business enterprise and the necessity to furnish it with a financial and political superstructure".

In June 1951, the AIPL was renamed as the Australian Industries Development Association (AIDA). Hosiery manufacturer George Foletta served as the organisation's president from 1951 to 1956.

=== Post-merger ===
The Business Council of Australia was formed in 1983, from a merger of AIDA and the Business Roundtable.

== Structure ==
=== Board ===
The board oversees the council's secretariat, committees and task forces, makes recommendations about membership and appointments, and proposes policies.

Board members, as of November 2024, were:

- President: Geoff Culbert - Chair of the NSW Fundraising Committee for the Australian Olympic Committee
- Chief executive: Bran Black
- Matt Comyn - CEO, Commonwealth Bank
- Karen Dobson - Managing Director, Dow Australia & New Zealand
- Danny Gilbert - Managing Partner, Gilbert + Tobin
- Mike Henry - CEO, BHP
- Meg O'Neill - CEO and Managing Director, Woodside Energy
- Kellie Parker - Chief Executive, Australia Rio Tinto
- Rob Scott - Managing Director, Wesfarmers
- Mel Silva, Managing Director and Vice President, Google Australia & New Zealand

Former presidents include Tim Reed, Catherine Livingstone, Tony Shepherd, Michael Chaney, Hugh Morgan, Roderick Carnegie and Arvi Parbo.

The secretariat works on policy, research, communications and administrative support.

The Strong Australia Network was established to lobby for regional businesses, and BizRebuild to help businesses damaged by floods or bushfires.

== Policy ==
The council's policy agenda has included plans to reform post-secondary education, cut rates of personal and company tax, and strengthen enterprise bargaining.

Members help develop policy through committees and special-issue task forces.

== Membership ==
As April 2025, members of the council were:

- Accenture
- Adamantem Capital
- AGL Energy
- Air Trunk
- Allens Linklaters
- Amazon
- Amcor
- Ampol
- ANZ Bank
- APA Group
- Apple
- Ashurst Australia
- ASX
- ATCO
- Atlassian
- Australian Foundation Investment Company
- Australian Unity
- Bain & Company
- Bank of America
- Bank of China
- Bendigo & Adelaide Bank
- BHP
- BlueScope
- BNP Paribas
- Boeing Australia
- Boston Consulting Group
- BP
- Brookfield Asset Management
- Bupa
- CIMIC Group
- Cisco
- Citigroup
- Clayton Utz
- Cochlear
- Coles Group
- Commonwealth Bank
- ConocoPhillips
- Corrs Chambers Westgarth
- CSIRO
- CyberCX
- DB Schenker
- Deloitte
- Dow Chemical Company
- Downer Group
- Dulux
- DXC Technology
- Endeavour Energy
- EnergyAustralia
- EY
- Fletcher Building
- Fortescue
- Fujitsu
- General Electric
- Gilbert + Tobin
- Goodman Group
- Google
- GrainCorp
- Hancock Prospecting
- HCLTech
- Heidelberg Materials
- Hello World
- Herbert Smith Freehills
- HiQ
- HSBC
- Insurance Australia Group
- IBM
- Incitec Pivot
- Infosys
- ING
- JBS Foods Australia
- Jemena
- JPMorgan Chase
- Kearney
- King & Wood Mallesons
- Komatsu
- KPMG
- L'Oréal
- La Trobe Financial
- Lendlease
- Macquarie Group
- Macquarie University
- Mastercard
- McDonald's
- McKinsey & Company
- Medibank
- Melbourne Business School
- Meta
- Microsoft
- MinterEllison
- Mirvac
- Mitsubishi Heavy Industries
- Mitsui & Co
- Monash University
- Morgan Stanley
- MUFG Bank
- National Australia Bank
- Norton Rose Fulbright
- Optus
- Origin Energy
- Port of Newcastle
- PwC
- Qantas
- Qube
- Ramsay Health Care
- Resolution Life
- Rio Tinto
- Rothschild & Co
- Salesforce
- Sanofi
- Santos
- Scentre Group
- Seek
- Shell
- Snowy Hydro
- South32
- Stockland
- Sun Rice Group
- Sydney Airport Holdings
- Tata Consultancy Services
- Telstra
- TPG Capital
- TransGrid
- Transurban
- Uber
- UBS
- University of Adelaide
- University of New South Wales
- University of Sydney
- UTS Business School
- Vicinity Centres
- Wesfarmers
- Western Sydney University
- Westpac
- Wilson Group
- Woodside Energy
- Woolworths

== See also ==
- Economy of Australia
- Australian Competition & Consumer Commission
- Council of Australian Governments
- National Competition Policy
