= Business Events Sydney =

Business Events Sydney, formerly known as Sydney Convention and Visitors Bureau, markets Sydney and New South Wales as a destination for Australian and international business meetings, incentives, conventions, and exhibitions. On average, Business Events Sydney secures 70 international events and welcomes 60,000 delegates per year.

Business Events Sydney Facts

Full title: Business Events Sydney

Head office: Sydney, NSW, Australia

Founded: Established in 1969 (then called the Sydney
Convention and Visitors Bureau, SCVB). In
September 2008, renamed organization
to 'Business Events Sydney'

Industry: Events Tourism

Staff: 40

Offices: Australia, Asia, North America, Europe/UK

Board members: 11

Website: https://www.businesseventssydney.com.au/

Business Events Sydney is a not-for-profit membership based organization that provides assistance and advice on planning and holding events in Sydney. They are also responsible for marketing Sydney and New South Wales as a business events destination to individuals and organizations to Australia and the world. They help to bid on, win and hold conferences, major events, conventions, business meetings and congresses in Sydney.

At the state level, they operate AccessNSW, a service for planning events, conferences and incentives throughout New South Wales.

== History ==
Business Events Sydney is a 40-year partnership between the Government of New South Wales and the tourism industry. Before 1 September 2008, Business Events Sydney was known as the Sydney Convention and Visitors Bureau.

== Funding ==
Business Events Sydney is a not–for-profit organization and is jointly supported by the NSW Government and the membership base.

== Green Sydney ==
Business Events Sydney promotes Sydney as an environmentally friendly city, due to the actions of citizens, businesses and local movements.

Business Events Sydney supports the Green Meetings Industry Council's 2020 agenda for what should comprise a 'green meeting'. These are conferences, events, incentives and meetings that:

- Have zero net environmental effect
- Fully integrate environmental responsibility into return-on-investment (ROI) analysis
- Are accepted and standard industry practice
- Achieve economic and strategic business goals
- Minimize or eliminate environmental impacts
- Positively contribute to the environment and host communities

=== Business Events Sydney Major Partners and industry bodies ===
Business Events Sydney works with several partners and industry bodies.

Partners:

- Destination NSW
- Sydney Harbour Foreshore Authority
- City of Sydney
- Sydney Convention and Exhibition Centre in Darling Harbour
- Accor

Industry bodies:

- Australian Tourism Export Council (ATEC)
- Association of Australia Convention Bureaux (AACB)
- Business Events Australia (BEA)
- Business Events Council of Australia
- Future Convention Cities Initiative (FCCI)
- International Congress and Convention Association (ICCA)
- Qantas
- Sydney Airport
- Sydney Business Chamber
- Sydney Olympic Park Authority
- Sydney Opera House
- Tourism and Transport Forum (TTF)

== Sydney's ranking as a business event city ==
Some highlight events secured by BESydney in FY11/12 include:

- Perfect China Leadership Seminar 2013 – 3,500 delegates, worth an estimated economic impact of $20.9 million
- IUCN World Parks Congress 2014 – 3,000 delegates, worth an estimated $23.6 million
- 12th Congress of the International Society for Organ Donation and Procurement (ISODP) 2013 – 400 delegates, worth an estimated $1.5 million
